= 1955 NASCAR Pacific Coast Late Model Division =

2nd season of the NASCAR Pacific Coast Late Model Division

Seasons
- ← 1954 1956 →

The 1955 NASCAR Pacific Coast Late Model Division was the 2nd season of the series. The title was won by Danny Letner, his first in the series.

== Schedule and results ==
The 1955 season included 14 individual races, although Gardena Stadium hosted four races and Contra Costa Speedway and Balboa Stadium hosted two races each. Multiple races were in combination with the NASCAR Grand National Division. The season's other races were in combination with the NASCAR Short Track Division.

Date	Name	Racetrack	Location	Winner
May 8	none	Arizona State Fairgrounds	Phoenix, Arizona	Tim Flock
May 15	none	Tucson Rodeo Grounds	Tucson, Arizona	Danny Letner
May 29	Gardena 200	Gardena Stadium	Gardena, California	Bill Amick
June 5	none	Contra Costa Speedway	Walnut Creek, California	Allen Adkins
June 11	none	Marchbanks Speedway	Hanford, California	Bill Amick
June 25	none	Balboa Stadium	San Diego, California	Marvin Panch
July 3	God Bless America 200	Gardena Stadium	Gardena, California	Allen Adkins
July 31	none	Bay Meadows Speedway	San Mateo, California	Tim Flock
August 14	none	Contra Costa Speedway	Walnut Creek, California	Danny Letner
August 20	Saturday Night 200	Balboa Stadium	San Diego, California	Marvin Panch
September 4	none	Gardena Stadium	Gardena, California	Danny Letner
October 16	none	Las Vegas Park Speedway	Las Vegas, Nevada	Norm Nelson
October 30	none	Gardena Stadium	Gardena, California	Chuck Meekins
November 20	none	Willow Springs Raceway	Rosamond, California	Chuck Stevenson

== Full Drivers' Championship ==
(key) Bold – Pole position awarded by time. Italics – Pole position set by owner's points. * – Most laps led. † – Finishing position unknown.
Note: only the final points of the top 10 were recorded. Due to missing information, some finishes marked as not running may not be accurate - their final status is not definitively known.

Pos	Driver	ASF	TUS	GAR	CCS	MBS	BAL	GAR	BMS	CCS	BAL	GAR	LVS	GAR	WSR	Pts
1	Danny Letner	12	1	17	2	3	2	**2***	3	1	**2***	1*	14	3	15	2056
2	Allen Adkins	5	2*		1	8	**7**	1	12	3	3	16	16	**0***†	5	1594
3	Marvin Panch	2	16	2	14	**11**	1*	7	4	2*	1				2	1524
4	Bill West	27		4		14	6	8	7	12	4	4	3	8	14	1500
5	Ed Brown	10	7		13	2		25	14	9	7	6	18		23	1164
6	Lloyd Dane	11	3		15			3	8	17	9	11	26		10	1064
7	Bill Amick	4	**5**	**1***	**5***	1*	3	19	29	13		15	24			944
8	Bill Stammer			0†				26	10		5	14	8	2	20	866
9	Sherman Clark				19			6	31	19	16	2	4	0†	8	760
10	George Seeger			5		7	4	22		14	10	**12**		5	6	738
	Chuck Meekins	24	4	0†			18	4	16		11	7		1	9	
	Herb Crawford	21	10			12	17	16			12		13		30	
	Erick Erickson	29					14	21	DNQ		13	5	22		18	
	Bob Havemann	9	6		3	6			19			9				
	John Lansaw					4		5		15	14	3	15			
	Bob Stanclift						10	11	33		6		10		22	
	Owen Loggins	16	19		10	10			18	21						
	Eddie Pagan								17		8	8	21		16	
	Ernie Young	19	14				15						9		34	
	Clyde Palmer	3			17					20			23		32	
	Fred Steinbroner											13	12	4	21	
	Carl Hammill				9	13			30	6						
	Ed Normi				16			24	11	18						
	Jim Reed			3										0†	**4**	
	Ed Goebel				4	9				11						
	Ben Gregory	7				5									17	
	Tony Nelson						5	23	DNQ		17					
	Hal Prentice						13	9	25							
	FiFi Scott	23	13		12											
	Tom Francis						12		DNQ				11		28	
	Chet Thompson				8				22	22						
	Joe Roletto								20	23		10				
	Mel Larson	26	8												19	
	Jim Cook							20	32						27	
	Tim Flock	**1***							**1**							
	Scotty Cain													0†	7	
	Johnny Mantz												7		3	
	Jim Graham				6				8							
	Mike McGreevy								13	4						
	Johnny Kieper								2*				17			
	Bob Ruppert												6		13	
	Johnny Jones						9	12								
	Frank Perry								21	**5**						
	Ray Clark	13	15													
	Jim Blomgren						16								12	
	Cliff Richmond	17	11													
	Bill Hyde												2		29	
	Ron Hornaday	14						17	DNQ							
	Dick Zimmerman	22	12													
	Rick DeLewis	18	18													
	Bill Williams								26	16						
	Arley Scranton							14							36	
	Howard Phillippi													0†		
	Norm Nelson												**1***			
	Chuck Stevenson														1*	
	Jim Murray												5			
	Buck Baker								5							
	Speedy Thompson	6														
	Lee Petty								6							
	Keith Olson				7											
	Jim Heath									7						
	Ken Johns	8														
	Jack Sloan						8									
	Johnny Mock		9													
	Ed Negre								9							
	Don Harrell									10						
	Eldon Bryhan				11											
	Chuck Thomson						11									
	Jim Sills														11	
	Art Dunne							13								
	Jess Nelson							15								
	Frank Douglas	15														
	Bill Galdarisi										15					
	Royce Hagerty								15							
	Jack Richardson		17													
	Mike Mitchell										18					
	Sam Lamm							18	DNQ							
	Joe Valente				18											
	Herb Hill												19			
	Virgil Martin												20			
	John Soares	20														
	Dusty Fuller								23							
	Dick Rathmann								24							
	Elgin Holmes														24	
	Pete Gomez									24						
	Rex DeLewis	25														
	Don Stanyer														25	
	Carl Hoover												25			
	Bill Stacy														26	
	Cliff Wright								27							
	Britton Jones												27			
	Elias Bowie								28							
	Fonty Flock	28														
	Dick Getty														31	
	Bill Moore														33	
	Crash Carson								34							
	Len Fraker														35	
	Fred Bince														37	
	Vee Dent								DNQ							
	Ted Lee								DNQ							

== See also ==
- 1955 NASCAR Grand National Series
