= Allen Adkins =

American racing driver (1929–1999)

- Born: March 29, 1929; Clovis, California, U.S.
- Died: January 12, 1999 (aged 69)
- Awards: West Coast Stock Car Hall of Fame (2005)

NASCAR Cup Series career
- 14 races run over 4 years
- Best finish: 42nd (1956)
- First race: 1954 Race 27 (Oakland)
- Last race: 1957 Race 43 (Sacramento)
Wins	Top tens	Poles
0	8	0

NASCAR Convertible Division career
- 33 races run over 1 year
- Best finish: 11th (1956)
- First race: 1956 Race 10 (Old Bridge)
- Last race: 1956 Race 47 (Orange)
- First win: 1956 Race 17 (Oklahoma City)
- Last win: 1956 Race 34 (Flat Rock)
Wins	Top tens	Poles
2	17	2

ARCA Menards Series West career
- 26 races run over 4 years
- Best finish: 2nd (1955)
- First race: 1954 Race 5 (Oakland)
- Last race: 1957 Race 23 (Sacramento)
- First win: 1954 Race 9 (Sacramento)
- Last win: 1955 God Bless America 200 (Gardena)
Wins	Top tens	Poles
3	18	2
- Statistics up to date as of March 18, 2026.

Allen Adkins (March 29, 1929 – January 12, 1999) was an American stock car racing driver. He competed in the NASCAR Grand National Series, NASCAR Convertible Division, and NASCAR Pacific Coast Late Model Division in the 1950s. He was an inductee to the West Coast Stock Car/Motorsports Hall of Fame in 2005.

== Racing career ==
Adkins began competing in NASCAR in 1954, running four NASCAR Pacific Coast Late Model Division races, including two that were in combination with the NASCAR Grand National Series. In the combination races at Oakland Stadium and Bay Meadows Speedway, he finished third and fourth respectively. The other two races were in combination with the NASCAR Short Track Division, the first coming at Balboa Stadium where he finished twelfth, out of the race, due to a tire issue. In the season finale at Oakland Stadium, he scored his first win in the series. Despite only running four of nine races, he finished seventh in the final standings. The following season, he ran thirteen of fourteen races and finished second in points. He scored two wins, seven top-fives, and nine top-tens, as well as two poles. Four of these races were combination races with the Grand National Series. Adkins finished in the top-five in two of them, but crashed out of the other two. In 1956, Adkins focused on racing in the NASCAR Convertible Division, making thirty-three starts. Across these starts, he scored two wins, ten top fives, seventeen top-tens, and two pole positions, finishing eleventh in the standings. He made a total of six Grand National and four Pacific Coast Late Model starts as well, including competing in the Southern 500. This would be his best ranking in the Grand National Series, finishing forty-second in points. He made his final NASCAR starts in 1957 competing in two Grand National races and five Pacific Coast Late Model Division races. His final start came at the California State Fairgrounds Race Track, a combination race, where he finished thirteenth. After his time in NASCAR, Adkins continued racing modified stock cars and local short tracks, retiring from racing in the early 1960s to launch an auto parts business.

== Motorsports career results ==
=== NASCAR ===
(key) (Bold – Pole position awarded by qualifying time. Italics – Pole position earned by points standings or practice time. * – Most laps led.)

==== Grand National Series ====
NASCAR Grand National Series results
Year	Team	No.	Make	1	2	3	4	5	6	7	8	9	10	11	12	13	14	15	16	17	18	19	20	21	22	23	24	25	26	27	28	29	30	31	32	33	34	35	36	37	38	39	40	41	42	43	44	45	46	47	48	49	50	51	52	53	54	55	56	NGNC	Pts	Ref
1954	Gus Davis	68	Dodge	PBS	DAB	JSP	ATL	OSP	OAK	NWS	HBO	CCS	LAN	WIL	MAR	SHA	RSP	CLT	GAR	CLB	LND	HCY	MCF	WGS	PIF	AWS	SFS	GRS	MOR	OAK; 3	CLT	SAN; 4	COR	DAR	CCS	CLT	LAN	MAS	MAR	NWS																				46th	624	
1955	Gus Davis	7	Dodge	TCS	PBS	JSP	DAB	OSP	CLB	HBO	NWS	MGY	LAN	CLT	HCY	ASF; 5	TUS; 2	MAR	RCH	NCF	FOR	LIN	MCF	FON	AIR	CLT	PIF	CLB	AWS	MOR	ALS	NYF																												46th	740	
1955	Charles Vance	2	Dodge																														SAN; 12	CLT	FOR	MAS	RSP	DAR	MGY	LAN	RSP	GPS	MAS	CLB	MAR	LVP; 16	NWS	HBO												46th	740	
1956	Gus Davis	2	Dodge	HCY	CLT	WSS; 5	PBS	ASF; 13	DAB	PBS	WIL	ATL																																																42nd	1104	
1956	Tom Harbison	98	Ford										NWS; 7																																															42nd	1104	
1956	Tom Harbison	97	Ford											LAN; 6	RCH; 11	CLB	CON	GPS	HCY	HBO	MAR	LIN	CLT	POR	EUR	NYF	MER	MAS	CLT	MCF	POR	AWS	RSP	PIF	CSF	CHI	CCF	MGY	OKL	ROA	OBS	SAN	NOR	PIF	MYB	POR														42nd	1104	
1956	Dan Holcomb	48	Ford																																												DAR; 34	CSH	CLT	LAN	POR	CLB	HBO	NWP	CLT	CCF	MAR	HCY	WIL	42nd	1104	
1957	DePaolo Engineering	99	Ford	WSS	CON	TIC	DAB	CON	WIL	HBO	AWS	NWS; 6	LAN	CLT	PIF	GBF	POR	CCF	RCH	MAR	POR	EUR	LIN	LCS	ASP	NWP	CLB	CAP	PIF	JAC	RSP	CLT	MAS	POR	HCY	NOR	LCS	GLN	KPC	LIN	OBS	MYB	DAR	NYF	AWS															82nd	264	
1957	Jim Dane	4	Ford																																											CSF; 13	SCF	LAN	CLB	CCF	CLT	MAR	NBR	CON	NWS	GBF				82nd	264	

==== Pacific Coast Late Model Division ====
NASCAR Pacific Coast Late Model Division results
Year	Team	No.	Make	1	2	3	4	5	6	7	8	9	10	11	12	13	14	15	16	17	18	19	20	21	22	23	24	25	26	27	28	29	30	31	32	NPCLMC	Pts	Ref
1954	Gus Davis	68	Dodge	OAK	GAR	HMS	BST	OAK; 3	VSP	SAN; 4	BST; 12*	CAP; 1																								7th	858	
1955	Gus Davis	7	Dodge	ASF; 5	TUC; 2	GAR	CCS; 1	MBS; 8	**BAL**; 7																											2nd	1594	
1955	Charles Vance	2	Dodge							GAR; 1	BMS; 12	CCS; 3																								2nd	1594	
1955	Gus Davis	2	Dodge										BAL; 3	GAR; 16	LVS; 16	**GAR**; 0†	WSR; 5																			2nd	1594	
1956	Gus Davis	2	Dodge	LAS; 2	ASF; 13	LAS	LAS	SMS	LAS	BMT	POR	LAS	EUR	MER	BST	HBS	POR	LAS	BST	CSF	BMT	CCS	BKS	LAS	BMS	POR	BST	LAS	HUG	POR	LAS	SCF				37th	642	
1956	Gus Davis	22	Ford																														LAS; 19	WSS	LAS; 2	37th	642	
1957	Oscar Maples	12	Ford	GAR	GAR	GAR	BKS	POR	GAR	POR	GAR; 5	EUR																								NA	NA	
1957	Vel Miletich	11	Ford										SGS; 10	SRS	ASP	CCS	CAP	MER	GAR	BAL	POR															NA	NA	
1957	Ed Chann / Al Liggons	225	Mercury																			BMT; 5	KPC	LAS												NA	NA	
1957	Jim Dane	4	Ford																						LAS; 5	CSF; 13	SCF									NA	NA	

† - It is known Adkins participated in the race, winning pole and retiring with piston issues after 33 laps, but his final position is unknown
