= Dick Rathmann =

American racing driver (1926–2000)

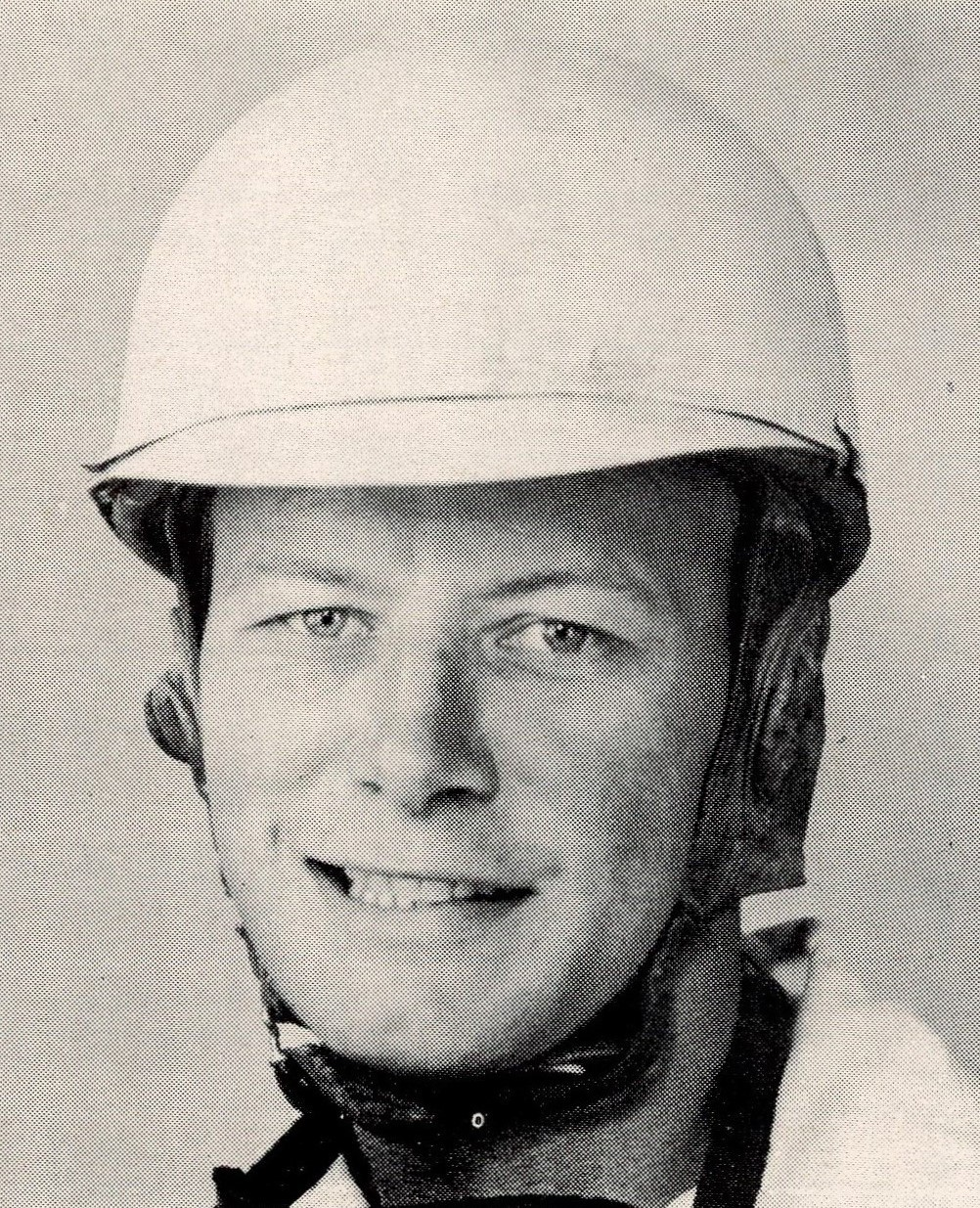
- Rathmann, circa 1957
- Born: James Merwin Rathmann; January 6, 1926 Los Angeles, California, U.S.
- Died: February 1, 2000 (aged 74) Melbourne, Florida, U.S.

Champ Car career
- 41 races run over 11 years
- Years active: 1949–1950, 1956–1964
- Best finish: 10th – 1961
- First race: 1949 Golden State 100 (Sacramento)
- Last race: 1964 Indianapolis 500 (Indianapolis)
Wins	Podiums	Poles
0	3	3

NASCAR Cup Series career
- 129 races run over 5 years
- Best finish: 3rd (1953)
- First race: 1951 Race 4 (Carrell)
- Last race: 1955 Race 37 (Langhorne)
- First win: 1952 Race 5 (Martinsville)
- Last win: 1954 Race 24 (Santa Fe)
Wins	Top tens	Poles
13	79	13

Formula One World Championship career
- Active years: 1950, 1956–1960
- Team(s): Watson, Kurtis Kraft, Lesovsky
- Entries: 6 (5 starts)
- Championships: 0
- Wins: 0
- Podiums: 0
- Career points: 2
- Pole positions: 1
- Fastest laps: 0
- First entry: 1950 Indianapolis 500
- Last entry: 1960 Indianapolis 500

James Merwin "Dick" Rathmann (January 6, 1926 – February 1, 2000) was an American racing driver.

Rathmann and his younger brother swapped names while teenagers. He was an 18-year-old going by the name of Jim Rathmann, when his brother wanted to start racing. To help him enter races, he traded I.D.s with him, and assumed the identity of "Dick Rathmann." The name change stuck for life in public circles.

Rathmann drove in the AAA Championship Car series in the 1949 and 1950 seasons with four starts, including the 1950 Indianapolis 500. He finished in the top-ten once, in sixth position at Milwaukee in 1950.

In 1951, Rathmann moved to NASCAR, where he was a very successful Grand National driver through 1955.

In 1956, Rathmann returned to the USAC Championship Car series, racing in the 1956–1964 seasons with an additional 41 starts, including the Indianapolis 500 races in 1956 and 1958–1964. He finished in the top-ten 21 more times, with his best finish in second position in 1959 at Daytona.

Rathmann sat on the pole for the 1958 Indianapolis 500. On the first lap, he and fellow front-row starter Ed Elisian raced into turn 3 and started a chain-reaction accident which involved 15 cars and claimed the life of Pat O'Connor. With that accident, Rathmann became the first Indy pole-sitter to complete no laps. This feat has been repeated only twice in Indy history, first by Roberto Guerrero and then by Scott Sharp.

Rathmann was the elder brother of 1960 Indianapolis 500 winner Jim Rathmann. The two switched names in 1946 so his younger brother could enter a race while underage. For what was supposed to be a short time, he adopted the name "Dick" and his brother adopted the name "Jim". The change stuck for life.

In 2009, Rathmann was inducted into the West Coast Stock Car Hall of Fame.

== World Championship career summary ==
The Indianapolis 500 was part of the FIA World Championship from 1950 through 1960. Drivers competing at Indy during those years were credited with World Championship points and participation. Rathmann participated in five World Championship races. He started on the pole once and accumulated a total of two World Championship points.

== Racing record ==
=== American open-wheel racing ===
(key) (Races in bold indicate pole position)

==== USAC Championship Car ====
Year	1	2	3	4	5	6	7	8	9	10	11	12	13	14	Pos	Points
1949	ARL	INDY	MIL	TRE	SPR	MIL	DUQ	PIK	SYR	DET	SPR	LAN	SAC; 17	DMR; DNQ	–	0
1950	INDY; 32	MIL; 6	LAN; 13	SPR	MIL	PIK	SYR	DET	SPR	SAC	PHX	BAY	DAR		35th	80
1956	INDY; 5	MIL; 21	LAN; 15	DAR; 15	ATL	SPR; DNQ	MIL; 25	DUQ	SYR; DNQ	ISF; DNQ	SAC; 9	PHX; DNQ			16th	540
1957	INDY; Rpl	LAN	MIL	DET	ATL	SPR; 12	MIL; 16	DUQ	SYR	ISF; DNQ	TRE; 16	SAC	PHX; DNQ		39th	10
1958	TRE	**INDY**; 27	MIL; 14	LAN	ATL	SPR	MIL; 24	DUQ	SYR	ISF	TRE	SAC	PHX		–	0
1959	**DAY**; 5	TRE	INDY; 20	MIL; DNQ	LAN; 7	SPR; 6	MIL; 7	DUQ; 12	SYR	ISF; DNQ	TRE	SAC	PHX		16th	370
1960	TRE	INDY; 31	MIL; 10	LAN; 10	SPR	MIL; 3	DUQ; DNQ	SYR	ISF; DNQ	TRE; 10	SAC	PHX			17th	370
1961	TRE; 4	INDY; 13	**MIL**; 3	LAN; 6	MIL; 4	SPR; 3	DUQ; DNQ	SYR	ISF; 10	TRE; 20	SAC	PHX			10th	750
1962	TRE; 20	INDY; 24	MIL; DNQ	LAN	TRE; 18	SPR	MIL; 16	LAN	SYR	ISF	TRE	SAC	PHX		–	0
1963	TRE	INDY; 10	MIL; DNQ	LAN	TRE	SPR	MIL	DUQ	ISF	TRE	SAC	PHX			23rd	150
1964	PHX	TRE	INDY; 7	MIL	LAN	TRE	SPR	MIL	DUQ	ISF	TRE	SAC	PHX		20th	300

===== Indianapolis 500 =====
Year	Car	Start	Qual	Rank	Finish	Laps	Led	Retired
1950	45	18	130.928	17	32	25	0	Stalled
1956	18	4	144.471	6	5	200	0	Running
1957	73		140.780	Withdrew				
1958	97	1	145.974	**1st**	27	0	0	Crash T3
1959	73	4	144.248	5	20	150	0	Fire in the pit
1960	97	4	145.543	6	31	42	0	Brake Line
1961	97	6	146.033	8	13	164	0	Fuel Pump
1962	9	13	147.161	13	24	51	0	Magneto
1963	22	17	149.130	14	10	200	0	Running
1964	23	12	151.860	17	7	197	0	Flagged
**Totals**						1029	0	

Starts	9
Poles	1
Front Row	1
Wins	0
Top 5	1
Top 10	3
Retired	6

- Rathmann qualified for the 1957 race, but was mugged the night before the event. He was replaced in the car by Johnnie Parsons.

=== NASCAR ===
(key) (Bold – Pole position awarded by qualifying time. Italics – Pole position earned by points standings or practice time. * – Most laps led. ** – All laps led.)

==== Grand National Series ====
NASCAR Grand National Series results
Year	Team	No.	Make	1	2	3	4	5	6	7	8	9	10	11	12	13	14	15	16	17	18	19	20	21	22	23	24	25	26	27	28	29	30	31	32	33	34	35	36	37	38	39	40	41	42	43	44	45	NGNC	Pts	Ref
1951	Warren Fraser	12	Ford	DAB	CLT	NMO	GAR; 7	HBO																																									8th	1040	
1951	Walt Chapman	120	Ford						ASF; 28	NWS	MAR																																						8th	1040	
1951	Walt Chapman	120	Hudson									CAN; 9	CLS	CLB; 31	DSP; 2	GAR	GRS; 2	BAI; 2	HEI; 31	AWS	MCF	ALS			MOR; 33	ABS; 9	DAR	CLB	CCS									**OAK**; 20	NWS	HMS	JSP	ATL	GAR	NMO					8th	1040	
1951	Walt Chapman	21	Hudson																				MSF; 55							LAN; 3	CLT																		8th	1040	
1951	Walt Chapman	121	Hudson																					FMS; 25								DSP; 25	WIL	HBO	TPN	PGS	MAR												8th	1040	
1952	Walt Chapman	120	Hudson	PBS	DAB; 60	JSP	NWS; 23	MAR; 1	CLB; 3	ATL; 16	CCS; 24	LAN; 1**	DAR; 1	DSP; 1*			FMS; 2	HBO; 3	CLT; 5	**MSF**; 38	NIF; 12	OSW; 3	MON; 14	MOR	PPS	MCF; 3	AWS; 15			LAN; 5	DSP; 1	WIL; 5		MAR; 16*	NWS; 5														5th	3952.5	
1952			Ford												**CAN**; 11	HAY																																	5th	3952.5	
1952	Walt Chapman	20	Hudson																									DAR; 35	CCS																				5th	3952.5	
1952	Bruce Atchley	107	Hudson																														HBO; 25																5th	3952.5	
1952	George Hutchens	2	Olds																																	ATL; 14	PBS												5th	3952.5	
1953	Walt Chapman	120	Hudson	**PBS**; 22	DAB; 12	HAR; 2	NWS; 2	CLT; 13	RCH; 2	**CCS**; 1		CLB; 16	HCY; 5	MAR; 3	PMS; 2	RSP; 6	LOU; 2	**FIF**; 2	LAN; 1**	TCS; 2	WIL; 2	MCF; 2	PIF; 10	MOR; 1*	ATL; 2	RVS; 2	LCF; 1	DAV; 4	HBO; 19	AWS; 14	PAS; 4		DAR; 42	CCS; 16	LAN; 1	BLF; 2	WIL; 6	NWS; 24	MAR	ATL									3rd	7362	
1953			Plymouth								LAN; 16																																						3rd	7362	
1953			Olds																													HCY; 12																	3rd	7362	
1954	John Ditz	3	Hudson	**PBS**; 23	DAB; 4	JSP; 23	**ATL**; 3	OSP		NWS; 1	HBO; 4	**CCS**; 2	LAN; 3	WIL; 13	MAR; 11	**SHA**; 3	RSP; 2			CLB; 3	LND; 8	HCY; 4	MCF; 3	**WGS**; 2	PIF; 7	AWS; 3	SFS; 1*	GRS; 3	MOR; 4*	OAK	CLT; 2			DAR; DNQ	CCS	CLT; 4	LAN; 7	MAS; 2	MAR; 4	NWS; 5*									4th	6760	
1954	Ray Erickson	3	Hudson						OAK; 1																																								4th	6760	
1954	Gene Comstock	108	Hudson															CLT; 13	GAR																														4th	6760	
1954	Don Oliver	12	Olds																													SAN; 3																	4th	6760	
1954	Frank Christian	8	Hudson																														COR; 13																4th	6760	
1955	John Ditz	13	Hudson	TCS; 13																																													18th	2298	
1955	John Ditz	3	Hudson		**PBS**; 4	**JSP**; 2		**OSP**; 3	CLB; 3		NWS; 2	MGY; 9	LAN; 4	CLT; 18	HCY; 17	ASF	TUS	MAR																															18th	2298	
1955	Ernest Woods	88	Olds				DAB; 13																																										18th	2298	
1955	Dave Terrell	98	Olds							HBO; 14																																							18th	2298	
1955	John Ditz	3	Chrysler																RCH; 24	NCF; 23	FOR; 4	LIN	MCF	FON	AIR	CLT	PIF; 14	CLB	AWS	MOR; 27	ALS	NYF						DAR; 62	MGY	LAN; 30	RSP	GPS	MAS	CLB	MAR	LVP	NWS	HBO	18th	2298	
1955	Don Oliver	5	Olds																														SAN; 24	CLT	FOR	MAS	RSP												18th	2298	

==== Pacific Coast Late Model Division ====
NASCAR Pacific Coast Late Model Division results
Year	Team	No.	Make	1	2	3	4	5	6	7	8	9	10	11	12	13	14	15	16	17	18	19	20	21	22	23	24	25	26	27	28	29	30	31	32	NPCC	Pts	Ref
1954	Ray Erickson	3	Hudson	OAK; 1	GAR	HMS	BST	OAK	VSP																											11th	660	
1954	Don Oliver	12	Olds							SAN; 3	BST	CAP																								11th	660	
1955	Don Oliver	5	Olds	ASF	TUS	LAS	COS	HMS	BST	LAS	SAN; 24	COS	BST	LAS	LVP	LAS	WSS																			NA	NA	
1956	Hoyt Platt	66	Mercury	LAS	ASF	LAS	LAS	SMS	LAS	BMT	POR	LAS	EUR	MER	BST	HBS	POR	LAS	BST	CSF	BMT	COS	BKS	LAS	SAN	POR	BST	LAS	HUG	POR	LAS	SCF	LAS	WSS	LAS; DNQ	NA	0	

=== Complete Formula One World Championship results ===
(key) (Races in bold indicate pole position; races in italics indicate fastest lap)

Year	Entrant	Chassis	Engine	1	2	3	4	5	6	7	8	9	10	11	WDC	Pts
1950	A. J. Watson	Watson	Offenhauser L4	GBR	MON	500; Ret	SUI	BEL	FRA	ITA					NC	0
1956	Lee Elkins	Kurtis Kraft 500C	Offenhauser L4	ARG	MON	500; 5	BEL	FRA	GBR	GER	ITA				19th	2
1957	Chapman Root	Kurtis Kraft 500G	Offenhauser L4	ARG	MON	500; Rpl	FRA	GBR	GER	PES	ITA				–	–
1958	Lee Elkins	Watson	Offenhauser L4	ARG	MON	NED	**500**; Ret	BEL	FRA	GBR	GER	POR	ITA	MOR	NC	0
1959	Lee Elkins	Watson	Offenhauser L4	MON	500; Ret	NED	FRA	GBR	GER	POR	ITA	USA			NC	0
1960	Jim Robbins	Watson	Offenhauser L4	ARG	MON	500; Ret	NED	BEL	FRA	GBR	POR	ITA	USA		NC	0
