= Bill West (racing driver) =

American racing driver (1927–2017)

- Born: Bill Westerfeld; June 27, 1927; Belgrade, Nebraska, U.S.
- Died: January 5, 2017 (aged 89); Bakersfield, California, U.S.

NASCAR Cup Series career
- 8 races run over 3 years
- Best finish: 52nd (1955)
- First race: 1954 Race 16 (Gardena)
- Last race: 1956 Race 39 (Bay Meadows)
| Wins | Top tens | Poles |
|---|---|---|
| 0 | 3 | 0 |

ARCA Menards Series West career
- 25 races run over 4 years
- Best finish: 4th (1955)
- First race: 1954 Race 2 (Gardena)
- Last race: 1957 Ascot 100 (Gardena)
| Wins | Top tens | Poles |
|---|---|---|
| 0 | 13 | 0 |
- Statistics up to date as of August 17, 2026.

Bill Westerfeld, better known as Bill West, (June 27, 1927 – January 5, 2017) was an American professional stock car racing driver. He competed in the NASCAR Grand National Series and NASCAR Pacific Coast Late Model Division in the 1950s.

== Racing driver ==
Following a move from his birthplace in Nebraska to Southern California and time in the Army during the Korean War, West competed in midgets, sprint cars, stock cars, and jalopies. In the second ever race of the NASCAR Pacific Coast Late Model Division, what is now the ARCA Menards Series, West scored a seventh-place finish at Carrell Speedway. This race was in combination with the NASCAR Grand National Series and therefore also served as his debut in what is now the NASCAR Cup Series. West competed in six more NASCAR Pacific Coast Late Model Division races in 1954, scoring a best finish of sixth at Capital Speedway. Two of these additional starts were combination races, where West drove for eventual Pacific Coast Late Model runner-up Danny Letner. West competed in at least twelve of the fourteen Pacific Coast Late Model races held in 1955, scoring four top-fives including a career best third, which came in one of the season's combination races with the Grand National Series. He finished fourth in the final standings. West competed in five Pacific Coast Late Model Division races in 1956, scoring a best finish of fourth. This included his final two Grand National starts, where he finished fourteenth and 21st at Willow Springs Speedway and Bay Meadows Speedway respectively. West made his final Pacific Coast Late Model Division start in 1957 at Los Angeles Speedway, where he finished in 11th. He continued racing in other series, with his final recorded start coming in September 1967 in the NASCAR Late Model Sportsman National Championship at Middle Georgia Raceway, where he finished last in the 32 car field.

== Personal life ==
Born in Belgrade, Nebraska to Frank and Hattie Westerfeld, Bill was the youngest of six children and moved to California in the early 1940s when his father was searching for work. He worked at a local restaurant and graduated from Long Beach High School before entering the Army at age 18 and serving in the Korean War. Bill worked in the construction and tile business for several years when a friend approached him about opening a restaurant, H. Salt Fish & Chips. Bill eventually owned three H. Salt Fish & Chips restaurants in the Los Angeles area. West ultimately moved to the Bakersfield area and opened a truck stop with his son in Buttonwillow. He owned the truck stop for about ten years before retiring. He met his wife, Betty, at a local golf tournament. West enjoyed going to Lake Havasu to fish and ski, riding motorcycles with his friends, golfing, and attending his grandkids events, such as school plays or sporting events.

== Death ==
West died at his home in Bakersfield on January 5, 2017, at the age of 89.

== Motorsports career results ==
=== NASCAR ===
(key) (Bold – Pole position awarded by qualifying time. Italics – Pole position earned by points standings or practice time. * – Most laps led.)

==== Grand National Series ====
NASCAR Grand National Series results
| Year | Team | No. | Make | 1 | 2 | 3 | 4 | 5 | 6 | 7 | 8 | 9 | 10 | 11 | 12 | 13 | 14 | 15 | 16 | 17 | 18 | 19 | 20 | 21 | 22 | 23 | 24 | 25 | 26 | 27 | 28 | 29 | 30 | 31 | 32 | 33 | 34 | 35 | 36 | 37 | 38 | 39 | 40 | 41 | 42 | 43 | 44 | 45 | 46 | 47 | 48 | 49 | 50 | 51 | 52 | 53 | 54 | 55 | 56 | NGNC | Pts | Ref |
|---|---|---|---|---|---|---|---|---|---|---|---|---|---|---|---|---|---|---|---|---|---|---|---|---|---|---|---|---|---|---|---|---|---|---|---|---|---|---|---|---|---|---|---|---|---|---|---|---|---|---|---|---|---|---|---|---|---|---|---|---|---|---|
| 1954 | Bert Letner | 89 | Hudson | PBS | DAB | JSP | ATL | OSP | OAK | NWS | HBO | CCS | LAN | WIL | MAR | SHA | RSP | CLT | GAR; 7 | CLB | LND | HCY | MCF | WGS | PIF | AWS | SFS | GRS | MOR | | | | | | | | | | | | | | | | | | | | | | | | | | | | | | | 65th | 356 | |
| 1954 | Danny Letner | 89 | Hudson | | | | | | | | | | | | | | | | | | | | | | | | | | | OAK; 26 | CLT | SAN; 20 | COR | DAR | CCS | CLT | LAN | MAS | MAR | NWS | | | | | | | | | | | | | | | | | | | | 65th | 356 | |
| 1955 | Unknown | 39 | Hudson | TCS | PBS | JSP | DAB | OSP | CLB | HBO | NWS | MGY | LAN | CLT | HCY | ASF; 27 | TUS | MAR | RCH | NCF | FOR | LIN | MCF | FON | AIR | CLT | PIF | CLB | AWS | MOR | ALS | NYF | | | | | | | | | | | | | | | | | | | | | | | | | | | | 52nd | NA | |
| 1955 | Jim Dane | 33 | Hudson | | | | | | | | | | | | | | | | | | | | | | | | | | | | | | SAN; 7 | CLT | FOR | MAS | RSP | DAR | MGY | LAN | RSP | GPS | MAS | CLB | MAR | LVP; 3 | NWS | HBO | | | | | | | | | | | | 52nd | NA | |
| 1956 | Jim Dane | 33 | Hudson | HCY | CLT | WSS; 14 | PBS | ASF | DAB | PBS | WIL | ATL | NWS | LAN | RCH | CLB | CON | GPS | HCY | HBO | MAR | LIN | CLT | POR | EUR | NYF | MER | MAS | CLT | MCF | POR | AWS | RSP | PIF | CSF | CHI | CCF | MGY | OKL | ROA | OBS | | | | | | | | | | | | | | | | | | | 113th | NA | |
| 1956 | Cos Cancilla | 55 | Olds | | | | | | | | | | | | | | | | | | | | | | | | | | | | | | | | | | | | | | | SAN; 21 | NOR | PIF | MYB | POR | DAR | CSH | CLT | LAN | POR | CLB | HBO | NWP | CLT | CCF | MAR | HCY | WIL | 113th | NA | |

==== Pacific Coast Late Model Division ====
NASCAR Pacific Coast Late Model Division results
| Year | Team | No. | Make | 1 | 2 | 3 | 4 | 5 | 6 | 7 | 8 | 9 | 10 | 11 | 12 | 13 | 14 | 15 | 16 | 17 | 18 | 19 | 20 | 21 | 22 | 23 | 24 | 25 | 26 | 27 | 28 | 29 | 30 | 31 | 32 | NPCLMC | Pts | Ref |
|---|---|---|---|---|---|---|---|---|---|---|---|---|---|---|---|---|---|---|---|---|---|---|---|---|---|---|---|---|---|---|---|---|---|---|---|---|---|---|
| 1954 | Bert Letner | 89 | Hudson | OAK | GAR; 7 | HMS; 21 | BST; 14 | | | | | | | | | | | | | | | | | | | | | | | | | | | | | 13th | 590 | |
| 1954 | Danny Letner | 89 | Hudson | | | | | OAK; 26 | VSP | SAN; 20 | | | | | | | | | | | | | | | | | | | | | | | | | | 13th | 590 | |
| 1954 | Bert Letner | 3 | Hudson | | | | | | | | BST; 19 | CAP; 6 | | | | | | | | | | | | | | | | | | | | | | | | 13th | 590 | |
| 1955 | Unknown | 39 | Hudson | ASF; 27 | TUC | | | | | | | | | | | | | | | | | | | | | | | | | | | | | | | 4th | 1500 | |
| 1955 | Jim Dane | 33 | Hudson | | | GAR; 4 | CCS | MBS; 14 | BAL; 6 | GAR; 8 | BMS; 7 | CCS; 12 | BAL; 4 | GAR; 4 | LVS; 3 | GAR; 8 | WSR; 14 | | | | | | | | | | | | | | | | | | | 4th | 1500 | |
| 1956 | Cos Cancilla | 6 | Olds | LAS; 8 | ASF | LAS | LAS; 14 | SMS | LAS; 4 | BMT | POR | LAS | EUR | MER | BST | HBS | POR | LAS | BST | CSF | BMT | CCS; 8 | BKS | LAS | | | | | | | | | | | | 45th | 514 | |
| 1956 | Cos Cancilla | 55 | Olds | | | | | | | | | | | | | | | | | | | | | | BMS; 21 | POR | BST | LAS | HUG | POR | LAS | SCF | LAS | WSS | LAS | 45th | 514 | |
| 1957 | William West | 50 | Dodge | GAR | GAR | GAR | BKS | POR | GAR | POR | GAR | EUR | SGS | SRS | ASP | CCS | CAP | MER | GAR | BAL | POR | BMT | KPC | LAS | LAS; 11 | CSF | SCF | | | | | | | | | NA | NA | |
