= 1954 NASCAR Pacific Coast Late Model Division =

1st season of the NASCAR Pacific Coast Late Model Division

Seasons
- ← none 1955 →

The 1954 NASCAR Pacific Coast Late Model Division was the 1st season of the series. The title was won by Lloyd Dane, making him the inaugural champion in what is now the ARCA Menards Series West.

== Schedule and results ==
The 1954 season included 9 individual races, with Oakland Stadium and Balboa Stadium hosting two races each. Four of the season's races were in combination with the NASCAR Grand National Series. The other five races were in combination with the NASCAR Short Track Division.

Date	Name	Racetrack	Location	Winner
March 28	none	Oakland Stadium	Oakland, California	Dick Rathmann
May 30	none	Carrell Speedway	Gardena, California	John Soares
June 26	none	Marchbanks Speedway	Hanford, California	Marvin Panch
July 4	none	Balboa Stadium	San Diego, California	Danny Letner
August 1	none	Oakland Stadium	Oakland, California	Danny Letner
August 7	none	Vallejo Speedway	Vallejo, California	Marvin Panch
August 22	none	Bay Meadows Speedway	San Mateo, California	Hershel McGriff
October 2	none	Balboa Stadium	San Diego, California	Robert Caswell
October 10	none	Capital Speedway	Sacramento, California	Allen Adkins

== Full Drivers' Championship ==
(key) Bold – Pole position awarded by time. Italics – Pole position set by owner's points. * – Most laps led.

Pos	Driver	OAK	GAR	HMS	BAL	OAK	VSP	SAN	BAL	CAP	Pts
1	Lloyd Dane	5	2	8	6	5	5	8	**2***	5	1530
2	Danny Letner		**3**	**4**	**1***	1*	**2***	7	15	20	1292
3	Marvin Panch	2		1*	3	**2**	1	10			1042
4	Ben Gregory	11	4	22		4	7	18	3	2	982
5	John Soares	3	1*	2	4	23	3	34	9	22	974
6	Robert Caswell	14		5		32	6	9	1	3	888
7	Allen Adkins					3		4	12	1	858
8	Tony Nelson		8	10	10	12		14	7	27	842
9	Joe Valente	12	9	6		28	13	16		21	686
10	Woody Brown	24	18	3		13	8	15		15	666
11	Dick Rathmann	1						3			660
12	Jim Cook	10	26	11	7	14	17	31	14	14	620
13	Bill West		7	21	14	26		20	19	6	590
14	Lee Petty	6						5			580
15	Hershel McGriff	**20***						**1***			548
16	Eddie Pagan		12					21	8	10	536
17	Bill Amick	21						2			520
18	Jim Graham					6	11	11		23	520
19	Charles Pemberton					10	12	13		19	486
20	Erick Erickson		6		2			22			464
21	Herb Thomas							6			400
22	Bob Havemann	8	11								324
23	Bill Bade		10	20	21	24	16	36			322
24	Bill Galdarisi		15		8				20	24	276
25	Sam Hawks	7		17		20		27			256
26	Bill Stammer	16	17		18						236
27	Ed Normi					15		41		7	222
28	Jim Heath	9					15	25			200
29	Buck Baker							17			180
30	Bud Diamond		32	7	24	16	18				180
31	Cliff Roberts	15	19								172
32	Jack Barney						9			11	158
33	Art Watts	25				11		28			148
34	Bob Tyrell		14								144
35	Bob Stanclift				11				18	26	138
36	Rick Henderson	13				29		29			132
37	Jim Sills									4	132
38	Jim Blomgren								21	12	114
39	Lee Humphers						14			17	102
40	Chuck Meekins		28	9	22	8		12	11	**16***	96
41	Len Fraker								10	25	96
42	Dick Carter	18				31		35			84
43	H. R. Kahl	17	30								84
44	Wally Baker									13	78
45	Al Neves					19		26			76
46	Blackie Pitt							23			60
47	FiFi Scott									18	48
48	Sam Arena			19							28
49	Red Ortwein					25		37			28
	Ernie Young		24	16	25	22		32	6	8	
	Dick Zimmerman			13	23	21	4	38	5		
	George Seeger		5	14	5	27			4		
	Bill Smith		13	18		7		39			
	Clyde Palmer	4				9	10				
	Ted Lee		25					33	13		
	Sid Plummer			12	16						
	Arley Scranton		21		12						
	Bob Rose		22		13						
	Jerry Keyes		23		20						
	Fred Bince		27					19			
	Howard Phillippi					30		30			
	Dick Elliott				9						
	Kirby Miller									9	
	Jack Taylor				15						
	Johnny Mello			15							
	Jack Jordan								16		
	Tom Drake		16								
	Herb Crawford								17		
	Bob Bowman				17						
	Eli Vukovich					17					
	Marian Pagan					18					
	Sam Lamm				19				DNQ		
	Paul Phipps	19									
	Johnny Kieper		20								
	Richard Brown	22									
	Bill Williams	23									
	Bob Deehan								24		
	Bill Weiman	26									
	Allen Heath		29								
	Dick Freeman		31								
	Don Woodard					33					
	George Rogge							40			
	Vee Dent	DNQ									
	Larry Steffin								DNQ		
	Bud Kelleher							DNQ			

== See also ==
- 1954 NASCAR Grand National Series
