= 1954 NASCAR Grand National Series =

American motorsport season

Seasons
- ← 1953 1955 →

The 1954 NASCAR Grand National season consisted of 37 races from February 1, 1954, to November 1, 1954. Lee Petty, driving for Petty Enterprises, won the championship, his first of three in the series.

== Season recap ==
The 1954 season consisted of 37 events from February 7 through October 24 of the year; opening in West Palm Beach, Florida, with a Herb Thomas victory, and concluding in North Wilkesboro, North Carolina, at the North Wilkesboro Speedway with a Hershel McGriff win. While Thomas captured the opening event in a Hudson, the year was witness to the increased power of GM, Ford and Chrysler as Hudson slipped in its domination of the sport from previous years. Petty came back to win the second race of the year at Daytona Beach, Florida, in his Chrysler. Petty completed the season with 32 top-10 finishes of the 34 events that he competed in. Through 1953, and up until the Southern 500 in 1954, Petty strung together a streak of 56 consecutive races where he was still running at the end of the race.

While Petty won fewer races (7) than Herb Thomas (12), his consistency in finishing in the top 10 a total of seven times more than Thomas proved to be the deciding factor in winning the championship with a 283-point margin. Rising star Buck Baker captured the winner's purse a total of four times in 1954, and finished third after a 12th-place effort in 1953. Although several of the top stars of the sport had disagreements, and even walked away from NASCAR for a time, the sport showed itself to be larger than any of the individual stars. When Tim Flock was disqualified at Daytona, he quit the sport for a time. Fonty Flock, Al Keller and Hershel McGriff also resigned at various times throughout the year. Also in 1954, drivers Petty, Thomas, Baker, Dick Rathmann, McGriff, Keller, Jim Paschal, Curtis Turner, Gober Sosebee, John Soares, and Danny Letner all captured at least one victory during the year.

== Season highlights ==
Two-time champion Herb Thomas' season opening victory in February earned him $1,600, which included prize monies from both the Pure Oil Company and Champion Spark Plugs. On February 20, Cotton Owens captured a modified-sportsman victory in an event that featured 136 starting entries, the largest ever starting field in a NASCAR event. A day later, Tim Flock reached the checkered flag first, but was disqualified for using a two-way radio, and Lee Petty was awarded the victory. It was the first time that radios were used in a NASCAR event, and Flock quit after the disqualification.

On March 28, Dick Rathmann won a 125-mile race at Oakland Stadium after starting the event in last place. The track was unusual in its configuration in that it consisted of dirt corners and paved straightaways. The race was in combination with the newly formed NASCAR Pacific Coast Late Model Division, making Rathmann the first winner in the series.

On June 13, NASCAR held its first ever road course event, at the airport in Linden, New Jersey, with driver Al Keller coming away with the win in a Jaguar, as 20 of the 43 starting entries were foreign made vehicles. The victory was the only win for a foreign-manufactured vehicle until Toyota captured its first victory at Atlanta Motor Speedway in March 2008 and as of the 2026 season, it is the only win scored by both Jaguar and a European manufacturer in the NASCAR Cup Series.

== Schedule & Race summaries ==
Schedule

1. Palm Beach Speedway, West Palm Beach, Florida
2. Daytona Beach & Road Course, Daytona Beach, Florida
3. Speedway Park, Jacksonville, Florida
4. Lakewood Speedway, Atlanta, Georgia
5. Oglethorpe Speedway, Savannah, Georgia
6. Oakland Stadium, Oakland, California
7. North Wilkesboro Speedway, North Wilkesboro, North Carolina
8. Occoneechee Speedway, Hillsburg, North Carolina
9. Central City Speedway, Macon, Georgia
10. Langhorne Speedway, Langhorne, Pennsylvania
11. Wilson Speedway, Wilson, North Carolina
12. Martinsville Speedway, Martinsville, Virginia
13. Sharon Speedway, Hartford, Ohio
14. Raleigh Speedway, Raleigh, North Carolina
15. Charlotte Speedway, Charlotte, North Carolina
16. Carrell Speedway, Gardena, California
17. Columbia Speedway, Cayce, South Carolina
18. Linden Airport, Linden, New Jersey
19. Hickory Motor Speedway, Hickory, North Carolina
20. Monroe County Fairgrounds, Rochester, New York
21. Williams Grove Speedway, Mechanicsburg, Pennsylvania
22. Hub City Speedway, Spartanburg, South Carolina
23. Ashville-Weaverville Speedway, Weaverville, North Carolina
24. Santa Fe Speedway, Willow Springs, Illinois
25. Grand Rapids Speedway, Grand Rapids, Michigan
26. Morristown Speedway, Morristown, New Jersey
27. Oakland Stadium, Oakland, California
28. Southern State Fairgrounds, Charlotte, North Carolina
29. Bay Meadows Speedway, San Mateo, California
30. Corbin Speedway, Corbin, Kentucky
31. Darlington Raceway, Darlington, South Carolina
32. Central City Speedway, Macon, Georgia
33. Southern State Fairgrounds, Charlotte, North Carolina
34. Langhorne Speedway, Langhorne, Pennsylvania
35. Memphis-Arkansas Speedway, LeHi, Arkansas
36. Martinsville Speedway, Martinsville, Virginia
37. North Wilkesboro Speedway, North Wilkesboro, North Carolina

Race Summaries

=== 1954–01 ===
The first race of the season was run at Palm Beach Raceway in West Palm Beach, Florida. Dick Rathman won the pole.

==== Top 10 results ====
1. 92 - Herb Thomas
2. 87 - Buck Baker
3. 42 - Lee Petty
4. 80 - Jim Paschal
5. 24 - Ray Ruhigg
6. 6 - Ralph Liguori
7. 86 - Don Oldenberg
8. 126 - Dave Terrell
9. 82 - Joe Eubanks
10. 181 - Tommie Elliott

=== 1954–02 ===
The second race of the season was run at Beach & Road Course in Daytona Beach, Florida. Lee Petty won the pole.

==== Top ten results ====
1. 42 - Lee Petty
2. 87 - Buck Baker
3. 14 - Curtis Turner
4. 3 - Dick Rathman
5. 2 - Bill Blair
6. 122 - Jack Smith
7. 13 - Emory Lewis
8. 25 - Fireball Roberts
9. 51 - Gober Sosebee
10. 77 - Stan Kross

=== 1954–03 ===
The third race of the season was run at Speedway Park in Jacksonville, Florida. Curtis Turner won the pole.

==== Top ten results ====
1. 92 - Herb Thomas
2. 14 - Fonty Flock
3. 42 - Lee Petty
4. 82 - Joe Eubanks
5. 87 - Buck Baker
6. 86 - Don Oldenberg
7. 23 - Al Keller
8. 181 - Tommie Elliott
9. 6 - Ralph Liguori
10. 4 - Tommy Moon

=== International 100 ===
The International 100 was the first NASCAR Grand National Series held on a road course in series history, occurring on June 13, 1954. Held on a 2-mile (3.2 km) temporary five-turn road course built of the runways and taxi lanes of Linden Airport in Union County, New Jersey, the race featured a battle of American-built stock cars versus European built sports cars. 43 cars entered, with speculation that the American cars would be stronger on the straights and the European cars stronger in the turns.

After starting on pole position, Buck Baker led the early part of the race, leading the first 19 laps until being passed by Herb Thomas. Seven laps later, Al Keller, driving a Jaguar XK120 Competition Coupe, grabbed the lead from Thomas, a position he would not relinquish the rest of the event. Baker had begun to catch up to Keller but his brakes began to fail, resulting in him holding back and giving second place to Joe Eubanks. 5,000 spectators witnessed the race at Linden Airport. It would mark the second and final NASCAR Grand National Series win for Keller, having won at Oglethorpe Speedway in March 1954. It would also be the only race held at Linden Airport.

It was the first race to be won by a foreign manufacturer car and as of 2026, it remains as the only win scored by Jaguar in NASCAR.

==== Top ten results ====
1. 4–Al Keller
2. 82–Joe Eubanks
3. 88–Buck Baker
4. 2–Bill Claren
5. 32–Bob Grossman
6. 7-A–Harry LaVois
7. 92–Herb Thomas
8. 3–Dick Rathman
9. 21–Laird Bruner
10. 42–Lee Petty

=== Southern 500 ===
The 1954 Southern 500 was a NASCAR Grand National Series race that took place on September 6, 1954, at Darlington Raceway in the American community of Darlington, South Carolina.

There were 364 laps done on a paved oval track that spanned 1.375 miles (2.213 km). Van Van Wey made his NASCAR debut in this race; starting in 43rd place and ending in 20th place due to a crash on the 260th lap.

Overall, the race took five hours, sixteen minutes, and one second from the first green flag to the checkered flag. The average speed was 95.026 miles per hour (152.930 km/h) and the pole speed was 108.261 miles per hour (174.229 km/h). There were two cautions for four laps and the margin of victory was twenty-six seconds. Attendance of the race was confirmed at 28,000 people during the start of the race. Notable racers that appeared and did not finish in the top ten included Lee Petty (whose streak of 36 top-ten finishes ended at this race), Cotton Owens, Jimmie Lewallen, Ralph Liguori, Arden Mounts, Elmo Langley (in his NASCAR debut) and Buck Baker (pole winner).

==== Top ten results ====
1. 92 - Herb Thomas
2. 44 - Curtis Turner
3. 98 - Marvin Panch
4. 58 - Johnny Patterson
5. 88 - Jim Paschal
6. 40 - John Soares
7. 25 - Fireball Roberts
8. 7 - Gwyn Staley
9. 13 - Joel Million
10. 12 - Speedy Thompson

=== Mid-South 250 ===
The 1954 Mid-South 250 was a NASCAR Grand National race that took place on October 10, 1954, at Memphis-Arkansas Speedway in the community of LeHi, Arkansas.

One hundred and sixty-seven laps were raced on a dirt track spanning 1.500 miles (2.414 km). Twelve-thousand people attended this untelevised race where Buck Baker won in his 1954 Oldsmobile. Other notable competitors included Lee Petty (who led 150 laps which was considered to be the most laps), Marvin Panch, Jimmie Lewallen, Arden Mounts, and Junior Johnson. The average speed of the race was 89.013 miles per hour (143.253 km/h) and the race took two hours, forty-eight minutes, and fifty-one seconds to complete.

==== Top ten results ====
1. 87 - Buck Baker
2. 3 - Dick Rathman
3. 42 - Lee Petty
4. 92 - Herb Thomas
5. 4 - Herschel Buchanan
6. 114 - Slick Smith
7. 98 - Marvin Panch
8. 189 - Lou Figaro
9. 14 - Hershel McGriff
10. 44 - Gober Sosebee

== Final championship standings ==
(key) Bold – Pole position awarded by time. Italics – Pole position set by owner's points. * – Most laps led.

Pos	Driver	PBS	DAB	JSP	ATL	OSP	OAK	NWS	HBO	CCS	LAN	WIL	MAR	SHA	RSP	CLT	GAR	CLB	LND	HCY	MCF	WGS	PIF	AWS	SFS	GRS	MOR	OAK	CLT	SAN	COR	DAR	CCS	CLT	LAN	MAS	MAR	NWS	Pts
1	Lee Petty	3	**1***	3	6		6	5	6	9	**9***	4	2	1*	4	2		5	10	2	1	7	3	4	4	1	6		1	5	1	38	3	2	2	3*	**1***	32	8649
2	Herb Thomas	1	59	1*	1	**10**		2	1	18	1*	10	9	10	**1***	18		6	7	**1***	**2***	1*	1	**1***	2	**22**	2		14	6	4	1	20	6	**1***	4	16	3	8366
3	Buck Baker	2*	2	5	2	2		15	**3**	8	6	1*	18	2	9	1*		**8**	3	3	4	6	4	14	**5**	2	**1**		**5***	17	3	**44**	21	3	4	1	3	2	6893
4	Dick Rathmann	**23**	4	23	3		1*	1	4	**2**	3	13	11	**3**	2	13		3	8	4	3	**2**	7	3	1*	3	4*		2	3	13	DNQ		4	7	2	4	5*	6760
5	Joe Eubanks	9	18	4	8	5		3	7	11	4	15	13	4	33	3		7	2	6	10	4	5	6	7	9	30		7		7	15	4	5	10	32	13	10	5467
6	Hershel McGriff		12				**20**								3	10		2	30	7	5	3	**10**	13	3	21	3		15	**1***	2	45	1	**1**	3	9	2	**1**	5137
7	Jim Paschal	4	27	24	19	7		9	24	3		**5**	1*	20	28					21			6	10	11	18	28		20		**19**	5	7	23	11	47	6	12	3903
8	Jimmie Lewallen		19		11	18		10	25						5	23				10	8	5	2	2			5		18		20	41	13	8	6	11	18	22	3233
9	Curtis Turner		3	**13**	7			4	5	5			3		22			1*														2*							2994
10	Ralph Liguori	6	51	9	13	6		6	11	10		3	**16**		11	25		9		8	7	8									16	30	5		47	15	35	7	2905
11	Blackie Pitt							24	14	20	8	16	10	16	17	DNQ		11		11	18	10	12	17	20	7	11		6	23	6	43	14	16	36	17	39	28	2661
12	Dave Terrell	8	32	21	17	15		22	28		24	12	6	8	16	9		15	27	19	9	17	13	8	13	6	9		11			33		20	44	48	32	18	2645
13	Bill Blair		5		10					12	15	6	17	6	10	5				22	24	15	14				14		8			DNQ	8		38	DNQ	10	8	2362
14	Laird Bruner	17	22	22	12				9		12		5	5	23	22		16	9	17	19	14	17	7	8	23			12		12	23			40	39			2243
15	Gober Sosebee		9	16	**4**	3		**12***	26	1	23		15			21		18						5					10		17	DNQ	16			10	23	27	2114
16	John Soares						3										1*											23		34	8	6	18	12	52				2072
17	Marvin Panch						2																					**2**		10	9	3		22	13	7	19	6	1935
18	Eddie Skinner	22	39	15	29	9		16	17	17	25				25			14					11									14			16		15	29	1794
19	Joel Million												24		21				17													9	17		14	34	30	16	1779
20	Elton Hildreth		38	18	30			19	19		16		19		8	11						9					32					16			56	DNQ		15	1710
21	Arden Mounts							21	13				14		26	20							9	11								11			45	40	17	11	1705
22	Fireball Roberts		8		22										20			13														7							1648
23	Speedy Thompson		20												27			4		9			21	18								10							1480
24	Johnny Petterson		49	17																												4				36			1417
25	Erick Erickson																6													22		39	10		5	13			1337
26	Ray Duhigg	5							10						7					20		22	20	20	9	4					21					44	31		1245
27	Slick Smith		60												12	14							19													6		4	1122
28	Clyde Minter											9	7		34	19		10		12			8	16					21			DNQ		10			12	9	1116
29	Gwyn Staley																															8						31	1088
30	Lloyd Dane						5										2											5		8									984
31	Donald Thomas					4			2*	6		14	20		29											20					5	DNQ						17	980
32	Ted Chamberlain					16								9	18				22		14	25										31			19	24	22		920
33	Danny Letner																**3**											1*		7		47							915
34	Elmo Langley																															12			59				864
35	Tim Flock		62																														**2***	9	8	22			860
36	Fred Dove							13	22				8		24	7		17		14			16	15								DNQ		25			29	24	832
37	Bill Widenhouse																															17	15	11	26	27	43		805
38	Gene Comstock																															13							780
39	Walt Flinchum									14			21		19	12				16				9		8											44		756
40	Charlie Cregar														15							40										20		13	41	DNQ			716
41	Bill Amick						21																							2		19	19	21	50				700
42	Harvey Eakin		40						16		20				35							32										18			37				698
43	Lou Figaro																																			8	9	13	690
44	Ken Fisher																				12	28					7					40			12				668
45	Jim Reed		16																40		27	12			6	5									35	46	5		631
46	Russ Helper										18			19	14	4					20	39																	624
47	Allen Adkins																											3		4									624
48	Van Van Wey																															29			18	12			602
49	Tony Nelson																8											12		14									568
50	John Dodd Jr.																																				8		552
51	Bob Welborn	11	31	19		20		11	27	7										DNQ									3			48	6		60		11		548
52	Jim Clark				16					13	14	11			30	6																							548
53	Herschel Buchanan																																			5			525
54	Joe Valente						12										9											28		16									524
55	Junior Johnson																			5															15	**51**	33		465
56	Jim Graham																											6		11		DNQ							460
58	Art Watts						25																					11		28		21							448
59	Robert Caswell						14																					32		9									436
60	Woody Brown						24										18											13		15									436
61	Dink Widenhouse																			23									4			42		7			40	30	428
62	Tommie Elliott	10		8		8																																	416
63	Charles Pemberton																											10		13									388
64	Jack Smith		6		24	19				22									23								17												376
65	Bill West																7											26		20									356
66	Stan Kross		10		26			23		21	22																												344
67	Whitey Brainerd										7											13																	332
68	Bob Havemann						8										11																						324
69	Dean Pelton																					11										36			20				324
70	John McGinley													15							6	33										46							316
71	Ted Rambo		54		32	14		20	8																														310
72	Chuck Hanson																					35					8							19	46	21	34		309
73	George Parrish																												19			22					37		304
74	Charles Hardiman																																			14			300
75	Bud Harless							17	15																											41	14	26	289
76	Parks Surratt			14														12		15			15									DNQ							288
77	Paul Pettit										5		22																										284
78	Pop McGinnis	19	28													8																35							274
79	Elbert Allen		35	12					18	16																													270
80	Eddie Pagan																12													21									268
81	George Clark																		18								13												264
82	Jim Cook						10										26											14		31									256
84	Cotton Owens																												9			34					42	23	228
85	Bill Bade																10											24		36									228
86	Reds Kagle																																		17				224
87	Sam Hawks						7																					20		27									220
88	Floyd Curtis				15																										10								216
90	Don White		11																																				210
91	Joe Bossard																		21					DNQ			19												196
92	Gary Mathieson										10																												192
93	Bill Stammer						16										17																						188
94	Joe Bill O'Dell												23									19													22		25		184
95	Bobby Courtwright										11																												180
96	John Erickson																																			19			175
97	Peck Peckham																		24			20					24												174
98	Cliff Roberts						15										19																						172
99	Bill Barker		58																32			18					23												168
100	Tex Brooks																		20								31												158
101	Jim Heath						9																							25									156
102	Joe Weatherly											7																											152
103	Ronnie Kohler																										10								33				152
104	Billy Minter															15																		18			38	19	152
105	Bo Fields																																			20			150
106	Bob Tyrell																14																						144
107	Charlie Mincey																																9						136
108	Jim Gillette																															24					24		136
109	Rick Henderson						13																					29		29									132
110	Bill Galdarisi																15																						132
111	Tommy Moon			10																																			128
112	Hooker Hood																																			31		14	121
113	Al Metz													11																									120
114	John Smith																														11								120
115	Perk Brown								21				12																16										120
116	Fred Starr																							12			35												120
117	Mel Krueger	13	36																																				118
118	C. H. Dingler				9					15																										30			113
119	Dick Sanford																										12												112
120	Buster Whaley																																12						112
121	Eddie Van Horn																										15								53				112
122	Mike Brown		30											14																									110
123	Otis Martin		13		20																											25							108
124	Ed Normi																											15		41									108
125	Matt Gowan										17																												108
126	Roland LaRue													13																									108
127	Ken Reeder																			13																			108
128	Sam Smith																												13										108
129	Don Welch																				13																		108
130	Dick Vermillion																														14								96
131	Bud Diamond																32											16											92
132	Dick Carter						18																					31		35									92
133	Dick Hallock																		31			27													34				90
134	Elmer Musclow																				15																		88
135	H. R. Kahl						17										30																						84
136	Gene Roberts																										16												80
137	Al Neves																											19		26									76
138	Ernie Young																24											22		32									76
139	Charles Merrill																																			23			75
140	Bob Schwingle																				17																		72
141	Bub King																														18								72
142	Charles Blewitt																																		23				72
143	Hassell Reid																															49		14			36		68
144	Gifford Wood														32																						20		68
145	Ralph Dutton							18																															64
146	Jim Ewing													18																									64
147	Ned Jarrett																			18																		21	64
148	Johnny Roberts	20	48																																				62
149	Dick Zimmerman																											21		38									60
150	Walt Harvey																															26							60
151	Buck Mason																															27							60
152	Joe Sheppard																															37							60
153	Jimmy Thompson																															50							60
154	George Cole																										20												48
155	Marshall Harless								20																														48
156	Gene Laughlin													21					26																				40
157	Carl Burris																																			QL	21		40
158	Hank Chaffee																				21																		40
159	Artie Mitchell					21																																	40
160	Nick Spano																										21												40
161	Gene Holcomb																					24													30				40
162	Joe Guide		25																																	26			39
163	Jim Luke																				22																		32
164	Dick Stone													22																									32
165	Dick Ross																																		25		27		32
166	Ed DeWolff																										26								63				32
167	Bill Cleveland																										27								39				32
168	Ed Paskovich																					29					33								43				32
170	Red Ortwein																											25		37									28
171	Jimmy Ayers																																	17		37			25
172	Ed Massey																																			25			25
173	Robert Slensby																																			28			25
175	Lloyd Chick																																			33			25
176	Leland Sewell																																			35			25
177	Bud Chaddock																																			38			25
178	Dutch Munsinger																																			43			25
179	Bob Kennedy																																		49				24
180	Hilly Rife																					23																	24
181	Ash Tharrett																				23																		24
182	Clayton D'Aniello																																		27				24
183	E. J. Turner																																		28				24
184	John Ford																																		29				24
185	Leon Lundy																																		32				24
186	Chris Miller																																		42				24
187	Joe Bell																																		48				24
188	Bill Morgan																															DNQ			51				24
189	Dominic Persicketti																																		54				24
190	Al Neal																																		55				24
191	Kenneth Bridge																																		57				24
192	Bill Tanner																																		61				24
193	Harold Nash		46		28																																		22
194	Dick Garlington		26		34																																		22
195	Clarence Burch														31																								20
196	Pete Stewart																			24																			16
197	Pete Moxley																					38					25												16
198	Charles McDuffie																				30	31																	16
199	Virgil Livengood		34																																				14
200	Bob Sampson		41																																				14
201	Billy Rafter		42																																				14
202	Ernest Palmer		52																																				14
203	Bill Cornwall		53																																				14
204	George Osborne		55																																				14
205	Tommy Thompson		56																																				14
206	Victor Geiser		61																																				14
208	John Dodd Sr.																					36													9				8
209	Art Faber																										29												8
210	Jim Cooper																																				26		8
211	Bill Harrison				27																																		8
212	Wallie Branston																				28																		8
213	Bob Haden																				31																		8
214	Johnny Zeke																										34												8
215	Volney Schulze																					37																	8
216	Dizzy Dean																					41																	8
217	Glen Wood																																				41		8
218	Fran Jischke																				32																		8
	Al Keller	24	21	7	25	1*		7		4*	2	2	4		6	**16**			**1***																				
	Billy Irvin	14	44	11	21	17		14						12																									
	Don Oldenberg	7	23	6	18																															18	7		
	Emory Lewis		7		33	13			23			8																											
	Fonty Flock	12	57	2	5	11																																	
	Ben Gregory						11										4											4		18									
	Virgil Stockton																						18	19	14	10	Wth												
	Eddie Riker														13	24			11			16																	
	Andy Winfree							8	12																									24					
	Jack Clarke																		15		11	21																	
	Chuck Meekins																28											8		12									
	Bill Smith																13											7		39									
	Bucky Sager	21	24	20																																			
	Frank Stutts															17													17			32							
	Clyde Palmer						4																					9											
	George Seeger																5											27											
	Bob Flock				31	12																																	
	Fred Bince																27													19									
	Ken Pace																																				28	20	
	Mason Bright	16	33																																				
	Wimpy Irvan										13								36																				
	Bill Chevalier										19								35																				
	Ted Lee																25													33									
	Howard Phillippi																											30		30									
	Charles Binkley																															28				42			
	Bill Claren																		4																				
	Bob Grossman																		5																				
	Harry LaVois																		6																				
	Chuck Garrett													7																									
	Bill Moore																								10														
	Clare Lawicki																									11													
	Bill Tuten																																11						
	Earl Beer																		12																				
	Chuck Neale																									12													
	Hal Ruyle																								12														
	Phillips Bell																		13																				
	Jack Cummiford																									13													
	Bud Bennett																									14													
	Byron King		14																																				
	Tom Rivers																		14																				
	Jerry Wimbish				14																																		
	Allan Clarke	15																																					
	Jack Conely		15																																				
	Art Dugan																								15														
	Hank Russ																									15													
	Ken Taylor																														15	DNQ							
	Al Watkins																																	15					
	Andy Biddle																									16													
	Tom Drake																16																						
	James Kilgore																		16																				
	Frank Ropp																								16														
	Frank Smith																																			16			
	Billy Vee																				16																		
	Al Bolinger													17																									
	Dick Jennette																									17													
	Sam Pearson																								17														
	Ed Samples		17																																				
	Eli Vukovich																											17											
	Cotton Hodges	18																																					
	Ken Kiser																										18												
	Marian Pagan																											18											
	Ted Wright																								18														
	Richard Brownlee																									19													
	Fred Cole																		19																				
	Danny Curley																								19														
	Paul Phipps						19																																
	Wallace Simpson									19																													
	Johnny Kieper																20																						
	Dick Grice																							21															
	Jack Harrison										21																												
	Bill Lone																																		21				
	Arley Scranton																21																						
	Legs Whitcomb																								21														
	Bill Blackwell																												22										
	Richard Brown						22																																
	Slim Brown																								22														
	George Horvath																										22												
	Bob Rose																22																						
	Bay Darnell																								23														
	Jerry Keyes																23																						
	Joe Martin				23																																		
	Bill Williams						23																																
	Irv Atkinson																									24													
	Bob Deehan																														24								
	Junie Lancaster																																			24			
	Andy Bruni																									25													
	Red Duvall	25																																					
	Jim Frey																																					25	
	Arnold Ladd																		25																				
	Walter Milczarski																				25																		
	Jim Jones	26																																					
	Dick Kable																					26																	
	Sonny Walters																				26																		
	Bill Weiman						26																																
	Jack Spearman																		28																				
	Ronnie Hayes																				29																		
	Allen Heath																29																						
	Don Johnson																		29																				
	Jim McLain																																			29			
	Nero Steptoe		29																																				
	Frank Hannellburg																					30																	
	Dick Freeman																31																						
	John Lindsay																																		31				
	G. McBride																		33																				
	Don Woodard																											33											
	Shelby Cooper																					34																	
	Vince Gray																		34																				
	Jimmy Florian		37																																				
	Dick Keene																		37																				
	B. Fisher																		38																				
	Conrad Janis																		39																				
	George Rogge																													40									
	Jack Farnell																		41																				
	Frances Ballantine																		42																				
	Hap Jones		43																																				
	M. R. Peterson																		43																				
	William Kearney		45																																				
	Roscoe Rann																																			45			
	Jim Romine		47																																				
	Lucky Walters																																			49			
	Art Binkley		50																																				
	Harold Lutz																																			50			
	Richard Jones																																			52			
	Leslie Young																																		58				
	Jim Lacy																																		62				
	Pepper Cunningham																																		64				
	Vee Dent						DNQ																																
	Bud Kelleher																													DNQ									
	Paul Jones																														DNQ								
	Ross Morrison																															DNQ							
	Hank Carruthers																															DNQ							

== See also ==
- 1954 NASCAR Pacific Coast Late Model Division
