= Las Vegas Park Speedway =

Former horse and automobile racing venue

Coordinates: 36.1350°N 115.1454°W

Las Vegas Park
- Location: Winchester, Nevada
- Opened: September 4, 1953
- Closed: 1959
- Former names: Las Vegas Jockey Club
- Major events: AAA, NASCAR, USAC
- Surface: dirt track
- Length: 0.99 mi (1.6 km)

The Las Vegas Park was a horse and automobile racing facility in Winchester, Nevada. It was built to be a horse racing facility and it held single races in NASCAR Grand National Series, AAA, and USAC Stock cars before it was demolished. It opened as the Las Vegas Jockey Club.

== History ==
=== Construction ===
Joseph M. Smoot hitched a ride from lawyer Hank Greenspun to get from New York City to Las Vegas. He claimed to have helped build tracks in California and Florida which turned out to be untrue. The track was built to be a major horse racing facility on the south side of Las Vegas. Smoot funded the track by convincing 8000 shareholders to give him $2 million. "Old Joe knew a track wouldn't have a chance and he said so when he came here in 1946," Greenspun later said in his biography. After the construction was delayed well past its original opening date, Smoot published an apology in a local newspaper. Smoot and two others were charged with felony embezzlement after he could not provide receipts for missing $500,000. A trustee was appointed by a federal judge to run the track. Smoot remained indicted until he was found dead in a hotel room two years later.

=== Horse racing ===
On September 4, 1953 the track was opened named the Las Vegas Jockey Club. Ticket booths and tote boards did not work properly and only one entrance discouraged customers. Customers had to wait one hour in traffic to park and some went home without attending. 8200 customers attended in the first day and the board of directors closed the track for two weeks after the third day to replace the ticket booths. The track was rapidly losing money, so the board closed after operating 13 days. It opened back up in 1954 to host quarter horse racing but closed after seven weeks.

=== Auto Races ===
Three major auto racing event were held on the track. In 1954, an American Automobile Association (AAA) Champ Car event was held at the track, followed by a 1955 NASCAR Grand National race. The final race was a United States Auto Club (USAC) Stock Car event in 1959.

==== Championship car ====
The American Automobile Association held its final Indy Car race of the 1954 season on November 14. The 100-mile (160 km) event was won by season champion Jimmy Bryan. 16 cars started the race and six of them were unable to return after being involved in a second lap wreck.

===== Championship car results =====
1. Jimmy Bryan
2. Manny Ayulo
3. Jimmy Davies
4. Rodger Ward
5. Andy Linden
6. Tommy Hinnershitz
7. Rex Easton
8. Chuck Weyant
9. Pat O'Connor
10. Larry Crockett
11. Roy Prosser
12. Johnnie Tolan
13. Johnny Boyd
14. Bob Sweikert
15. Bob Carroll
16. Cal Niday
17. Tony Bettenhausen
18. Danny Oakes

==== NASCAR ====
The track's only NASCAR event was held at the 1-mile dirt track on October 16, 1955. The 43rd event for the season was scheduled for 200 laps. The race was won by three-time USAC stock car champion Norm Nelson after darkness shorted the event to 111 laps; it was his only NASCAR win. He led the final 106 laps in a Chrysler owned by 1955 championship owner Carl Kiekhaefer. Nelson won the race by two laps.

===== NASCAR results =====
1. Norm Nelson
2. Bill Hyde
3. Bill West
4. Sherman Clark
5. Jim Murray
6. Bob Ruppert
7. Johnny Mantz
8. Bill Stammer
9. Ernie Young
10. Bob Stanclift
11. Tom Francis
12. Fred Steinbroner
13. Herb Crawford
14. Danny Letner
15. John Lansaw
16. Allen Adkins
17. John Kieper
18. Ed Brown
19. Herb Hill
20. Virgil Martin
21. Eddie Pagan
22. Erick Erickson
23. Clyde Palmer
24. Bill Amick
25. Carl Hoover
26. Lloyd Dane
27. Britton Jones

==== USAC stock car race ====
USAC held a 250 lap USAC Stock Car race which it co-sanctioned with Automobile Racing Club of America (ARCA) on November 29, 1959. The race was shortened to 147 laps on account of darkness; Fred Lorenzen won the race after starting from the pole position. 16 of 35 starters finished the race.

===== USAC results =====
1. Fred Lorenzen
2. Mike Klapak
3. Harold Smith
4. Whitey Gerken
5. Bob Merritt
6. Wayne Weiler
7. Johnny Mantz
8. Bob Perry
9. Johnny Allen
10. Bob Duell
11. Dempsey Wilson
12. Jim Murphy
13. Chuck Webb
14. Cotton Farmer
15. Lou Fegers
16. Jimmy Davies

== Demolition ==
The board decided to destroy the track. It divided the land into four parcels and it is occupied by the Westgate Las Vegas, Las Vegas Convention Center, and part of the Las Vegas Country Club.
