= 1954 NASCAR Grand National Series race at Carrell Speedway =

1954 NASCAR Grand National and Pacific Coast Late Model race

1954 NASCAR Grand National Race 16 / Pacific Coast Late Model Race 2
Race details
- Race 16 of 33 in the 1954 NASCAR Grand National Series season Race 2 of 9 in the 1954 NASCAR Pacific Coast Late Model Division season
- Date: May 30, 1954
- Location: Carrell Speedway in Gardena, California
- Course: Permanent racing facility
- Course length: 0.500 miles (0.805 km)
- Distance: 496 laps, 248 mi (399.117 km)
- Scheduled distance: 500 laps, 250 mi (402.336 km)
- Average speed: 53.438 miles per hour (86.000 km/h)
- Attendance: 12,000

Pole position
Driver	Danny Letner	Joe Bearscheck

Most laps led
Driver	John Soares	Charles Vance
- Laps: 211

Winner
No. 4	John Soares	Charles Vance

On May 30, 1954, the sixteenth race of the 1954 NASCAR Grand National Series and second race of the 1954 NASCAR Pacific Coast Late Model Division was held at Carrell Speedway, a 0.500 mile (0.805 km) dirt track in Gardena, California. On the same day, the fifteenth race of the Grand National season was held at Charlotte Speedway, where most top Grand National drivers preferred to compete. The race ended four laps shy of the scheduled 500-lap distance due to a scoring error. This error was not discovered until the day after the race. A combination race between the Grand National Series and Pacific Coast Late Model Division, it was won by John Soares, his first career win in both series and the first win for the No. 4 car in what is now the NASCAR Cup Series. Lloyd Dane finished in second and Danny Letner rounded out the podium in third. The track was demolished two days later to allow the passage of a highway.

The race started three abreast to compete with that day's Indianapolis 500. On lap 51, H. R. Kahl crashed into a wooden fence; he would not make any more NASCAR starts after this. Polesitter Danny Letner led the first 105 laps of the race until he was passed by Lloyd Dane, who led from lap 106 to lap 285. John Soares, who had started in seventeenth, took the lead from Dane on lap 286. On lap 293, Bob Rose flipped and the car's roof was crushed, but he would escape unscathed. Soares led for the remainder of the race, winning by a lap over Dane. This was his only career win in both series.

== Report ==
Carrell Speedway was a 1/2 mile dirt track in Gardena, California. The track opened in 1940 and hosted midgets and AAA sprint cars. World War II caused the track to shut down from 1942 to 1946, when it reopened with the main feature now being roadsters and stock cars. Following the 1954 NASCAR race, the track was demolished to allow a highway to be built.

=== Entry list ===
#	Driver	Owner	Make
4	John Soares	Charles Vance	'54 Dodge
5	Chuck Meekins	Larry Dorsey	'52 Oldsmobile
6	Johnny Kieper	Vincent Cornella	'54 Ford
12	Ben Gregory	Cos Cancilla	'53 Oldsmobile
15	Cliff Roberts	Unknown	'50 Plymouth
16	Tony Nelson	Joe Savatier	'49 Ford
17	Jerry Keyes	Jerry Keyes	'54 Dodge
24	Bob Havemann	Bob Havemann	'54 Ford
28	Bud Diamond	Chester Price	'52 Hudson
30	Bill Stammer	Bill Stammer	'53 Pontiac
32	Dick Freeman	Pat Freeman	'53 Hudson
33	Lloyd Dane	Jim Dane	'53 Hudson
35	Bill Smith	Unknown	'51 Hudson
39	Danny Letner	Joe Bearscheck	'52 Hudson
40	Tom Drake	Unknown	'50 Ford
41	Ernie Young	Walt Palozi	'50 Plymouth
44	H. R. Kahl	Unknown	'52 Plymouth
45	Bill Galdarisi	Bill Galdarisi	'50 Ford
48	Allen Heath	Allen Heath	'54 Kaiser
50	Jim Cook	Leroy Weyher	'50 Oldsmobile
52	Eddie Pagan	Eddie Pagan	'50 Plymouth
65	Bill Bade	Sam Arena	'52 Oldsmobile
66	Erick Erickson	Walt Smith	'50 Oldsmobile
73	George Seeger	Carl Dane	'54 Ford
80	Arley Scranton	Arley Scranton	'50 Ford
82	Bob Tyrell	Unknown	'53 Ford
88	Woody Brown	Joe Mangini	'50 Oldsmobile
89	Bill West	Bert Letner	'51 Hudson
90	Ted Lee	Ted Lee	'50 Ford
91	Fred Bince	Fred Bince	'53 Dodge
93	Bob Rose	Unknown	'52 Henry J
99	Joe Valente	Joe Mangini	'50 Oldsmobile

== Qualifying ==
Danny Letner won the pole with a speed of 62.849 mph. It was his first career pole and the first for his car owner Joe Bearscheck, who was entering a car into a NASCAR race for the first time.

== Race results ==
Fin	St	#	Driver	Owner	Make	Laps	Led	Status
1	17	4	John Soares	Charles Vance	'54 Dodge	496	211	Running
2	4	33	Lloyd Dane	Jim Dane	'53 Hudson	495	180	Running
3	1	39	Danny Letner	Joe Bearscheck	'52 Hudson	490	105	Running
4	2	12	Ben Gregory	Cos Cancilla	'53 Oldsmobile	486	0	Running
5	4	73	George Seeger	Carl Dane	'54 Ford	486	0	Running
6	21	66	Erick Erickson	Walt Smith	'50 Oldsmobile	477	0	Running
7	6	89	Bill West	Bert Letner	'51 Hudson	476	0	Running
8	20	16	Tony Nelson	Joe Savatier	'49 Ford	475	0	Running
9	10	99	Joe Valente	Joe Mangini	'50 Oldsmobile	468	0	Running
10	7	65	Bill Bade	Sam Arena	'52 Oldsmobile	466	0	Running
11	14	24	Bob Havemann	Bob Havmann	'54 Ford	466	0	Running
12	23	52	Eddie Pagan	Eddie Pagan	'50 Plymouth	459	0	Running
13	16	35	Bill Smith	Unknown	'51 Hudson	455	0	Running
14	28	82	Bob Tyrell	Unknown	'53 Ford	450	0	Running
15	30	45	Bill Galdarisi	Bill Galdarisi	'50 Ford	445	0	Running
16	29	40	Tom Drake	Unknown	'50 Ford	444	0	Running
17	9	30	Bill Stammer	Bill Stammer	'53 Pontiac	441	0	Running
18	5	88	Woody Brown	Joe Mangini	'50 Oldsmobile	428	0	Running
19	24	15	Cliff Roberts	Unknown	'50 Plymouth	422	0	Running
20	15	6	Johnny Kieper	Vincent Cornella	'54 Ford	420	0	Running
21	22	80	Arley Scranton	Arley Scranton	'50 Ford	413	0	Running
22	32	93	Bob Rose	Unknown	'52 Henry J	393	0	Accident
23	19	17	Jerry Keyes	Jerry Keyes	'54 Dodge	338	0	Tie Rod
24	27	41	Ernie Young	Walt Palozi	'50 Plymouth	337	0	RF Hub
25	31	90	Ted Lee	Ted Lee	'50 Ford	328	0	Fuel Pump
26	11	50	Jim Cook	Leroy Weyher	'50 Oldsmobile	299	0	Rear End
27	3	91	Fred Bince	Fred Bince	'53 Dodge	200	0	Steering
28	12	5	Chuck Meekins	Larry Dorsey	'52 Oldsmobile	191	0	Wheel
29	18	44	Allen Heath	Allen Heath	'54 Kaiser	52	0	Fuel Pump
30	26	44	H. R. Kahl	Unknown	'52 Plymouth	51	0	Accident
31	25	32	Dick Freeman	Pat Freeman	'53 Hudson	20	0	Radiator
32	13	28	Bud Diamond	Chester Price	'52 Hudson	11	0	Wheel

Previous race: 1954 NASCAR Grand National Series race at Charlotte Speedway	NASCAR Grand National Series; 1954 season	Next race: 1954 NASCAR Grand National Series race at Columbia Speedway

Previous race: 1954 NASCAR Grand National Series race at Oakland Stadium	NASCAR Pacific Coast Late Model Division; 1954 season	Next race: 1954 NASCAR Pacific Coast Late Model Division race at Marchbanks Speedway
