= John Soares (racing driver) =

American racing driver (1918–2007)

John Soares Sr.
- Born: November 7, 1918; Oakland, California, U.S.
- Died: March 10, 2007 (aged 88)
- Awards: West Coast Stock Car Hall of Fame (2002)

NASCAR Cup Series career
- 13 races run over 3 years
- Best finish: 16th (1954)
- First race: 1951 Race 35 (Oakland)
- Last race: 1955 Race 13 (Phoenix)
- First win: 1954 Race 16 (Gardena)
Wins	Top tens	Poles
1	5	0

ARCA Menards Series West career
- 10 races run over 2 years
- Best finish: 5th (1954)
- First race: 1954 Race 1 (Oakland)
- Last race: 1955 Race 1 (Phoenix)
- First win: 1954 Race 2 (Gardena)
Wins	Top tens	Poles
1	6	1
- Statistics up to date as of March 12, 2026.

John Pershing Soares Sr. (November 7, 1918 – March 10, 2007) was an American stock car racing driver. He was a competitor in early NASCAR Grand National Series and NASCAR Pacific Coast Late Model Division seasons. He was an inductee of the inaugural West Coast Stock Car/Motorsports Hall of Fame class in 2002.

== Racing career ==
In his early career, Soares raced roadsters and midgets. He was a two-time Bay Cities Racing Association hardtop champion. Soares competed in at least one Pacific Racing Association Hard Top Division race in 1951, finishing third. He also made is his NASCAR Grand National Series debut at Oakland Stadium, finishing ninth. He also competed at Marchbanks Speedway, finishing 31st, and at Carell Speedway, also finishing 31st after failing to start.

In 1954 he competed in the Grand National Series again, running nine races including the Southern 500, where he finished sixth in a field of fifty cars. He also scored his lone victory in the series at Carrell Speedway in a combination race with the NASCAR Pacific Coast Late Model Division in its inaugural season. This win was the first for car No. 4 in what is now the NASCAR Cup Series. The race was cut short by four laps due to a scoring error. He competed full-time in the Pacific Coast Late Model Division that year, scoring the aforementioned win at Carrell, a pole position, and six top-tens, finishing fifth in the standings. In contesting the full Pacific Coast Late Model Division season, he competed in five NASCAR Short Track Division races that were combination races with the series. He competed in the NASCAR Late Model Sportsman National Championship, ranked 264th in the standings.

In 1955, Soares made his final Grand National Series Start, additionally being his final documented Pacific Coast Late Model Division start, finishing 20th at the Arizona State Fairgrounds.

In 1969, Soares was 18th in the NASCAR Late Model Sportsman National Championship standings. Soares stepped away from oval track racing after a fiery midget car crash at West Capital Speedway and began promoting drag racing.

Soares made his final NASCAR attempt in 1978, failing to qualify for the 1978 NASCAR Winston Cup Series season opener at Riverside International Raceway.

== Track promotion ==
In the 1960s, Soares began promoting Antioch Speedway and Petaluma Speedway. He continued promoting racetracks until 2002 and was inducted into Antioch's hall of fame.

== Personal life ==
Soares was married to Gladys Soares. Soares' son John Soares Jr. was also a NASCAR driver, although Soares initially pushed his son to do drag racing, building him a car. His other son Jim Soares worked in track preparation, racing photography, and as a track promoter.

== Death ==
Soares died from pneumonia on March 10, 2007.

== Motorsports career results ==
=== NASCAR ===
(key) (Bold – Pole position awarded by qualifying time. Italics – Pole position earned by points standings or practice time. * – Most laps led.)

==== Winston Cup Series ====
NASCAR Winston Cup Series results
Year	Team	No.	Make	1	2	3	4	5	6	7	8	9	10	11	12	13	14	15	16	17	18	19	20	21	22	23	24	25	26	27	28	29	30	31	32	33	34	35	36	37	38	39	40	41	42	43	44	45	NWCC	Pts	Ref
1951	Harry Schilling	41	Mercury	DAB	CLT	NMO	GAR	HBO	ASF	NWS	MAR	CAN	CLS	CLB	DSP	GAR	GRS	BAI	HEI	AWS	MCF	ALS	MSF	FMS	MOR	ABS	DAR	CLB	CCS	LAN	CLT	DSP	WIL	HBO	TPN	PGS	MAR	OAK; 9	NWS										NA	NA	
1951	Unknown	-	Olds																																					HMS; 31	JSP	ATL							NA	NA	
1951	Unknown	17	Olds																																								GAR; 31	NMO					NA	NA	
1954	Charles Vance	4	Dodge	PBS	DAB	JSP	ATL	OSP	OAK; 3	NWS	HBO	CCS	LAN	WIL	MAR	SHA	RSP	CLT	GAR; 1*	CLB	LND	HCY	MCF	WGS	PIF	AWS	SFS	GRS	MOR	OAK; 23	CLT	SAN; 34	COR; 8																16th	2072	
1954	Charles Vance	40	Dodge																															DAR; 6			LAN; 52	MAS	MAR	NWS									16th	2072	
1954	Charles Vance	4-W	Dodge																																CCS; 18	CLT; 12													16th	2072	
1955	Charles Vance	2	Dodge	TCS	PBS	JSP	DAB	OSP	CLB	HBO	NWS	MGY	LAN	CLT	HCY	ASF; 20	TUS	MAR	RCH	NCF	FOR	LIN	MCF	FON	AIR	CLT	PIF	CLB	AWS	MOR	ALS	NYF	SAN	CLT	FOR	MAS	RSP	DAR	MGY	LAN	RSP	GPS	MAS	CLB	MAR	LVP	NWS	HBO	209th	NA	
1978	RPM Engineering	7	Plymouth	RSD; DNQ	DAY	RCH	CAR	ATL	BRI	DAR	NWS	MAR	TAL	DOV	CLT	NSV	RSD	MCH	DAY	NSV	POC	TAL	MCH	BRI	DAR	RCH	DOV	MAR	NWS	CLT	CAR	ATL	ONT																121st	0	

==== Winston West Series ====
NASCAR Winston West Series results
Year	Team	No.	Make	1	2	3	4	5	6	7	8	9	10	11	12	13	14	15	16	17	18	19	20	21	22	NPCLMC	Pts	Ref
1954	Charles Vance	4	Dodge	OAK; 3	GAR; 1*	**HMS**; 2	BST; 4	OAK; 23	VSP; 3	SAN; 34	BST; 9	CAP; 22														5th	974	
1955	Charles Vance	2	Dodge	ASF; 20	TUC	GAR	CCS	MBS	BAL	GAR	BMS	CCS	BAL	GAR	LVS	GAR	WSR									NA	NA	
1978	RPM Engineering	7	Plymouth	RSD; DNQ	AAS	S99	SHA	PET	MMR	RSD	IFS	YAK	WSP	LSP	EVG	POR	CRS	ASP	SON	SHA	CBS	YAK	OSS	ONT	PHO	NA	0	
