= Chuck Meekins =

American racing driver (1933–1996)

- Born: Charles Raymond Meekins; June 22, 1933; Spickard, Missouri, U.S.
- Died: July 5, 1996 (aged 63); Las Vegas, Nevada, U.S.
- Awards: West Coast Stock Car Hall of Fame (2009)

NASCAR Cup Series career
- 24 races run over 5 years
- Best finish: 30th (1956)
- First race: 1951 Race 4 (Gardena)
- Last race: 1957 Race 43 (Sacramento)
| Wins | Top tens | Poles |
|---|---|---|
| 0 | 13 | 0 |

ARCA Menards Series West career
- 55 races run over 5 years
- Best finish: 2nd (1956)
- First race: 1954 Race 2 (Gardena)
- Last race: 1957 Race 23 (Sacramento)
- First win: 1955 Race 13 (Gardena)
- Last win: 1958 Gardena 150 (Gardena)
| Wins | Top tens | Poles |
|---|---|---|
| 5 | 37 | 7 |
- Statistics up to date as of October 2, 2026.

Charles Raymond Meekins (June 22, 1933 – July 5, 1996) was an American professional stock car racing driver. He competed in the NASCAR Grand National Series and NASCAR Pacific Coast Late Model Division in the 1950s.

== Racing career ==
Meekins began competing in the NASCAR Grand National Series in 1951, running five races with a best finish of second at Carrell Speedway. He also won the Pacific Racing Association Hard Top Division championship, winning at least two races. Meekins ran seven of nine races in the newly formed NASCAR Pacific Coast Late Model Division in 1954, scoring a pole and two top-tens. In the combination races with the Grand National Series, he finished 28th, eighth, and twelfth at Carrell Speedway, Oakland Stadium, and Bay Meadows Speedway respectively. Meekins ran ten Pacific Coast Late Model races in 1955, scoring at least five top-tens and his first career win at Gardena Stadium. In three combination races, he scored a best finish of fourth at the Tucson Rodeo Grounds. Meekins ran at least 25 of 32 Pacific Coast Late Model races in 1956, also failing to qualify for a race at Gardena Stadium and scoring five poles, 23 top-tens, and four wins. He finished second in the standings. Meekins ran a standalone Grand National race as well as six combination races, scoring six top-tens with a best finish of second at the California State Fairgrounds Race Track. Meekins started the 1957 Pacific Coast Late Model season opener with a pole at Gardena Stadium, where he led the first 65 laps before tangling with second-place Chuck Green and crashing out of the race. He would run at least eleven total races, scoring six top-tens. He ran a standalone Grand National race as well as five combination races, scoring four top-tens. He made two Pacific Coast Late Model starts at Gardena Stadium in 1958, finishing twelfth and ninth.
