= Harvey Eakin =

American racing driver (1926–1973)

- Born: October 30, 1926; Baltimore, Maryland, United States
- Died: January 13, 1973 (aged 46)

NASCAR Cup Series career
- 17 races run over 4 years
- Best finish: 42nd – 1954 NASCAR Grand National Series season
- First race: 1954 race at Daytona Beach and Road Course
- Last race: 1957 race at Langhorne Speedway
Wins	Top tens	Poles
0	0	0

Harvey Eakin (October 30, 1926 – January 13, 1973) was a NASCAR Grand National Series driver from Baltimore, Maryland who competed from 1954 to 1957.

== Summary ==
During the course of 17 races, he never won or even got a finish in the "top-ten." Eakin did race for 2,089 official NASCAR laps; bringing home $1,110 in the process ($12,724.23 when adjusted for inflation). His average start is 35th place while 25th place was considered to be par for the course for Eakin. His only DNQ came at the 1955 Southern 500. The previous year at the 1954 Southern 500, Eakin started in 31st in his 1954 Nash vehicle and finished in 18th place; collecting $250 in the process ($2,997.21 when adjusted for inflation).

Intermediate tracks were the most favored by Eakin; giving him an 18th-place finish on average. His weakness was on road courses where a 32nd-place finish was considered to be normal. Richmond Raceway was Eakin's favorite track because he would finish 15th place there on average. Raleigh Speedway was really not a good track for Eakin because of his tendency to finish in 33rd place there on average. Eakin has competed in the USAC Stock Car series on one occasion and was always considered to be an owner-driver.

Eakin wasn't a terrible driver, however, as he managed to get one "top-15" finish in addition to six "top-20" finishes. Nash and Ford were his preferred manufacturers when it came to NASCAR vehicles. Not all of Eakin's races were considered to be successes as he failed to complete eight out of the 17 races that he competed in.
