= West Coast Stock Car/Motorsports Hall of Fame =

Hall of Fame in the United States

The West Coast Stock Car/Motorsports Hall Of Fame, originally the West Coast Stock Car Hall of Fame, is a Hall of Fame for people associated primarily with late-model stock car racing on the West Coast of the United States. Many NASCAR Grand National Division, West Series champions are inducted in the Hall of Fame. Today, it is a digital hall of fame located online (Official website) with memorabilia located at the Estrella Museum in Paso Robles, California. Inductees are honored at an annual banquet in June at the Turn 11 Club, Sonoma Raceway, Sonoma, Calif. The members of the Hall of Fame board are largely related to NASCAR. The Hall of Fame eventually began to recognize competitors from other disciplines of motorsport including drag racing and various forms of open-wheel racing.

== History ==
The hall of fame was created in 2001. Nominees are either retired, deceased or have moved from one area of participation to another, or have been active in their primary field for at least 25 years. The first class was inducted in 2002.

== Board of directors ==
- Dave Allen
- John Bickford - (HOF Member)
- Ken Clapp - (HOF Member)
- Ray Claridge - (HOF Member)
- Charles Custer, Esq.
- Brendan Gaughan - (HOF Member)
- Julie Giese
- Jill Gregory
- Frank Gullum
- Tim Huddleston
- Tommy Hunt
- Billy Kann
- Judy Kean
- Owen Kearns - (HOF Member)
- Tony LaRussa
- Kristie Leader
- Jess "Duke" Love Esq. and Friends
- Bill McAnally - (HOF Member)
- Becky McBride
- Dennis Mattish
- Joe Nava
- Harold Osmer
- Jim Regitz
- Larree Renda
- Ralph Sheheen
- Richard Spencer
- Mike Verlatti
- Jim Williams - (HOF Member)
- Richard Woodland - (HOF Member)

Counsel:

- Donald Ornelas Jr. of Agajanian, McFall, Weiss, Tetreault & Crist LLP

== List of inductees ==
=== 2002 ===
The hall of fame inducted its inaugural class in 2002

- Christopher J.C. Agajanian
- Bruce Alexander
- Bill Amick
- Bob Barkhimer
- Scotty Cain
- Cos Cancilla
- Ken Clapp
- Ernie Conn
- Charlie Curryer
- Carl Dane
- Jim Dane
- Lloyd Dane
- Ray Elder
- Lou Figaro
- Eddie Gray
- Ron Hornaday Sr.
- Jimmy Insolo
- Parnelli Jones
- Danny Letner
- Jack McCoy
- Hershel McGriff
- Marvin Panch
- Marvin Porter
- Les Richter
- Jim Robinson
- Troy Ruttman
- Bill Schmitt
- Roy Smith
- John Soares Sr.
- Bill Stroppe

=== 2003 ===
The hall of fame inducted its second class in 2003

- Bob Beadle
- Dick Bown
- Margo Burke
- Sonny Easley
- Erick Erickson
- Shav Glick
- Dan Gurney
- Rajo Jack
- Eddie Pagan
- Frank Phillips
- Bob Ross
- Rodger Ward

=== 2004 ===
The hall of fame inducted its third class in 2004

- Frank Galpin
- George Jefferson
- Johnny Mantz
- Parky Nall
- Bill Sedgwick
- Clay Smith

=== 2005 ===
The hall of fame inducted its fourth class in 2005

- Allen Adkins
- Ron Ail
- Marion Collins
- Richard Elder
- Robert Estes
- Tom Hamilton
- Sam Hanks
- Ernie Irvan
- Floyd Johnson
- Dick Meyer
- Vel Miletich
- James Rush
- Leon Ruther
- Harry Schilling
- Len Sutton

=== 2006 ===
The hall of fame inducted its fifth class in 2006

- Ivan Baldwin
- Ray Claridge
- Jim Cook
- Mike Curb
- Walt Faulkner
- Beryl Jackson
- John Kieper
- Gary Nelson
- Don Noel
- Jim Rush

=== 2009 ===
The hall of fame inducted its sixth class in 2009.

- Chuck Bown
- Rick Carelli
- Joe Fernandez
- John Fernandez
- Doug George
- Ben Gregory
- Bert Letner
- Chuck Meekins
- Dick Rathmann
- Wayne Spears
- Art Watts

=== 2010 ===
The hall of fame inducted its seventh class in 2010.

- Allen Beebe
- Sean Boyan
- Bob Caswell
- Mike Chase
- Bill "Tiny" Clinton
- Duane Edwards
- Mel Fernandez
- Joe Mangini Jr.
- Mel Larson
- Gordon Martin
- Herb Nab
- Rod Osterlund
- James "Jim" Smith

=== 2011 ===
The hall of fame inducted its eighth class in 2011.

- Cary Agajanian
- Marvin Burke
- Owen Kearns
- Louis Mangini
- Roger McCluskey
- Chuck Parkko
- Al Schmidhammer
- George Seeger
- Chuck Stevenson
- Tim Williamson
- Joe Ruttman

=== 2012 ===
The hall of fame inducted its ninth class in 2012.

- The Justice Brothers
- Butch Gilliland
- Vic Kurten
- B.L. Marchbanks
- Bill McAnally
- Pat McElreath
- Bob Phillipi
- Fred Steinbroner

=== 2013 ===
The hall of fame inducted its tenth class on June 20, 2013.

- Ron Hornaday Jr.
- Chad Little
- Derrike Cope
- Randy Lynch
- Buddy Jobe

=== 2014 ===
The hall of fame inducted its eleventh class in 2014

- Bob Bondurant
- Marshall Chesrown
- Ron Eaton
- Steve Page
- Mike Skinner

=== 2015 ===
The hall of fame inducted its twelfth class in 2015

- Jerry Baxter
- John Cardinale
- Jason Leffler
- Warren Razore
- Doug Richert
- Jim Williams

=== 2016 ===
The hall of fame inducted its thirteenth class in 2016

- John Bickford
- Mike Duncan
- Johnny Key
- Al Pombo
- Jim Thirkettle

=== 2017 ===
The hall of fame inducted its fourteenth class in 2017

- Walker Evans
- Michael Gaughan
- Joe Leonard
- Gene Price
- Scott Pruett
- Frank Secrist
- Kenny Takeuchi

=== 2018 ===
The hall of fame inducted its fifteenth class in 2018

Heritage Inductees:

- Fred Agabashian
- George Bignotti
- William (Bill) Cheesbourg Jr.
- Clyde Prickett
- Marion (Mickey) Thompson

Inductees:

- Larry Albedi
- Joe Garone
- Oren Prosser
- Greg Pursley
- Bryan R. Sperber
- Richard (Dick) Woodland

=== 2019 ===
The hall of fame inducted its sixteenth class in 2019

Heritage Inductees:

- George Follmer
- Rick Henderson
- Marshall Sargent
- Bob Sweikert
- Bill Vukovich

Inductees:

- Gary Bechtel
- Bob Bruncati
- Jeff Gordon
- Doug McCoun
- Eric Norris
- J.D. Gibbs

=== 2020 ===
The hall of fame inducted its seventeenth class in 2020

Heritage Inductees:

- Harry Belletto
- Howard Kaeding
- Ken Miles
- Jim Pettit Sr.
- Billy Wilkerson

Inductees:

- Mike Bliss
- Craig Keough
- Rick Mears
- Jim Pettit II
- Jerry Pitts

=== 2021 ===
The hall of fame inducted its eighteenth class in 2021

Heritage Inductees:

- Dick Atkins
- Leo Hindery Jr.
- Dave MacDonald
- Howard Welch
- Ronald (Ron) Zajicek

Inductees:

- Dave Byrd
- Richie Clyne
- Tom Gloy
- Tommy Kendall
- George Snider
- Linda Vaughn

=== 2022 ===
The hall of fame inducted its nineteenth class in 2022

Heritage Inductees:

- Art Atkins
- Michael Atkinson
- Phil Casey
- Ron Esau
- Phil Hill
- Ken Sapper
- Jim Walker

Inductees:

- Greg Biffle
- Garrett Evans
- Brendan Gaughan
- David Gilliland
- John Moore
- Jimmy Sills

=== 2023 ===
The hall of fame inducted its twentieth class in 2023

Heritage Inductees:

- Don Basile
- Burt Foland
- Fred Gerhardt
- Nick Rescino
- Leroy Van Conett

Inductees:

- Kurt Busch
- Matt Crafton
- Kevin Harvick
- Brent Kaeding
- Lyn St. James

== See also ==
- West Coast of the United States
