= John Ditz =

John Ditz is a former NASCAR Grand National Series car owner whose career spanned from 1954 to 1955.

== Career ==
He employed Arden Mounts, Dick Rathmann, and Donald Thomas for his 52-race career as a NASCAR owner. Ditz's drivers earned two NASCAR victories in addition to 30 finishes in the "top five" and 35 finishes in the "top ten." These drivers also earned seven pole positions and lead 850 laps out of 7321. Ditz's drivers started in sixth place on average and finished in 10th place on average; for a grand total of 4,751.2 miles (7,646.3 km) raced. This owner competed in the 1955 Southern 500; with one of the highest paying prize purses prior to the 1959 Daytona 500. One of Ditz's wins came at the 1954 Wilkes County 160; with Dick Rathmann behind the wheel.

His total career earnings totaled $18,255 ($214,275.15 when adjusted for inflation).
