= Ed Brown (racing driver, born 1920) =

American racing driver (1920–2000)

- Born: March 15, 1920; Meridian, California
- Died: June 25, 2000 (aged 80)

NASCAR Cup Series career
- 9 races run over 6 years
- Best finish: 50th (1961)
- First race: 1955 Race 13 (Phoneix)
- Last race: 1968 Motor Trend 500 (Riverside)
Wins	Top tens	Poles
0	2	0

ARCA Menards Series West career
- 113 races run over 13 years
- Best finish: 3rd (1964)
- First race: 1955 Race 1 (Phoneix)
- Last race: 1972 Skagit 150 (Skagit)
Wins	Top tens	Poles
0	70	0
- Statistics up to date as of August 17, 2026.

Ed Brown (March 15, 1920 – June 25, 2000) was an American professional stock car racing driver. He competed in the NASCAR Grand National Series and NASCAR Winston West Series between 1955 and 1972.

== Racing career ==
Brown began competing in NASCAR in 1955, making his NASCAR Grand National Series and NASCAR Pacific Coast Late Model Division debut in the season-opener for the Pacific Coast Late Model Division, a combination race with the Grand National Series. He finished the race in 10th. Across eleven Pacific Coast Late Model Division starts in 1955, Brown scored one top-five and six top-tens. In four starts in combination races, he scored his lone Grand National top-tens in his first two starts. Brown only made two Pacific Coast Late Model Division starts in 1956, scoring a best result of 14th. He also made one Grand National Series start, where he finished 23rd. This race was in combination with the Pacific Coast Late Model Division as their 1955 finale while it counted as the third Grand National race of the 1956 season. He did not compete in the Pacific Coast Late Model Division in 1957 and only made one Grand National Series start during the 1957 season, although the race was held in November 1956, where he finished 17th in the season opener at Willow Springs Speedway. This race was in combination with the Pacific Coast Late Model Division as part of their 1956 season. Brown returned to NASCAR competition in 1961, finishing 17th in a combination race at the California State Fairgrounds Race Track and fourth in a Pacific Coast Late Model Division race at Ascot Park. He only has one known start in 1962, coming in a Pacific Coast Late Model Division race at the California State Fairgrounds Race Track, where he finished 11th. After not competing in 1963, Brown returned to the Pacific Coast Late Model Division in 1964, running at least 20 of the season's 29 races, finishing inside the top-ten in all but one start. He finished a career-best third in the standings. Brown would run at least 11 Pacific Coast Late Model Division races in 1965, scoring five top-tens. This included a return to the Grand National Series, where he finished 14th at Riverside International Raceway. In ten Pacific Coast Late Model Division starts in 1966, Brown again scored five top-tens. Brown made eight starts in ten attempts in 1967, failing to qualify at Altamont Motorsports Park and Alameda County Fairgrounds and scoring six top-ten finishes. He withdrew from the combination race at Riverside. Brown made 12 starts in 1968, scoring six top-tens. This included his final Grand National start, where he completed 73 laps before retiring with fuel pump issues at Riverside and finished in 21st. In seven Pacific Coast Late Model races in 1969, Brown scored four top-ten finishes. Brown attempted 11 races in the renamed Grand National West in 1970, failing to qualify at Medford Speedway and scoring eight top-tens in ten starts. In nine starts in the renamed Winston West Series in 1971, Brown finished in the top-ten six times. Brown's final NASCAR season came in 1972, where he competed in ten races and scored four top-tens.
