= Doug McCoun =

American racing driver

Doug McCoun is an American racing driver who won the NASCAR Weekly Series national championship in 1985 and 1985–86 Pacific Coast Regional Championships.

Driving a dirt Late Model for his father, owner Dick McCoun, Doug won 27 of the 53 NASCAR-sanctioned races that he entered. Most were at Watsonville Speedway, Merced Fairgrounds Speedway, and other race tracks in California.

McCoun had nine wins, 49 top-fives and 87 top-tens in 207 races in NASCAR Southwest Series between 1992 and 2005. McCoun also ran two races in the NASCAR Northwest Series, one in 1996 and the other in 1998, his best finish was a fifth-place at Portland.

== Awards ==
- As part of the 25th anniversary of the NASCAR Weekly Series in 2006, McCoun was named one of the series' All Time Top 25 drivers.
- He was inducted in the West Coast Stock Car Hall of Fame in 2019.
