= Bill Amick =

American racing driver (1925–1995)

- Born: November 16, 1925
- Died: July 15, 1995 (aged 69)
- Achievements: NASCAR Pacific Coast Late Model Division champion (1965)
- Awards: West Coast Stock Car Hall of Fame (2002 - Inaugural Class)

NASCAR Cup Series career
- 48 races run over 8 years
- Best finish: 16th (1957)
- First race: 1954 Race 6 (Oakland)
- Last race: 1965 Motor Trend 500 (Riverside)
- First win: 1957 Race 25 (Sacramento)
Wins	Top tens	Poles
1	27	5

NASCAR Convertible Division career
- 7 races run over 1 year
- Best finish: N/A
- First race: 1957 Race 4 (Greensboro)
- Last race: 1957 Race 32 (Charlotte)
- First win: 1957 Race 28 (Raleigh)
- Last win: 1957 Race 30 (Martinsville)
Wins	Top tens	Poles
3	4	4

ARCA Menards Series West career
- 72 races run over 14 years
- Best finish: 1st (1965)
- First race: 1954 Race 1 (Oakland)
- Last race: 1972 Yakima 125 (Yakima)
- First win: 1955 Gardena 200 (Gardena)
- Last win: 1965 California 100 (Sacramento)
Wins	Top tens	Poles
21	52	24
- Statistics up to date as of September 3, 2026.

Bill Amick (November 16, 1925 – July 15, 1995) was an American professional stock car racing driver from Portland, Oregon. In the NASCAR Winston Cup Series, he had one win, nineteen top-fives, 27 top-tens, and five poles. Amick also competed in the NASCAR Pacific Coast Late Model Division, winning the 1965 championship.

== Driving career ==
After racing in the NASCAR Pacific Coast Late Model Division, Amick jumped to the Grand National Series in 1954 and ran six races. Two years later, he was able to finish seventeenth in the standings. He improved that in 1957, to sixteenth place. That year, he also won his first and only race at the Capital Speedway in Sacramento, California. That was his highest point finish in his NASCAR Grand National Career. He only raced Grand National part-time because he wanted to focus on the Pacific Coast Late Models in which he finished second in the standings in 1964 and won the championship a year later. After a brief stint of running in the Can-Am Series, Amick retired and started working with NASCAR speedways.

== Personal life ==
He was the brother of fellow racing driver George Amick. Despite sharing the same first name, he was not the father of Lyndon Amick and they are not related at all. Lyndon Amick hails from South Carolina, while Bill and George Amick were from Vernonia, Oregon.

== Awards ==
Amick was inducted in the West Coast Stock Car Hall of Fame in its first class (2002).

Achievements
Preceded by Ron Hornaday Sr.	NASCAR Pacific Coast Late Model Division; 1965	Succeeded by Jack McCoy
