= Johnny Kieper =

American racing driver (1932–2022)

- Born: John Kieper; February 2, 1932; Portland, Oregon, U.S.
- Died: July 30, 2022 (aged 90)

NASCAR Cup Series career
- 16 races run over 7 years
- Best finish: 36th (1956)
- First race: 1954 Race 16 (Gardena)
- Last race: 1977 Los Angeles Times 500 (Ontario)
- First win: 1956 Race 28 (Portland)
| Wins | Top tens | Poles |
|---|---|---|
| 1 | 8 | 3 |

ARCA Menards Series West career
- 62 races run over 13 years
- Best finish: 10th (1956, 1976)
- First race: 1954 Race 16 (Gardena)
- Last race: 1982 Coors 250 (Phoenix)
- First win: 1956 Race 28 (Portland)
| Wins | Top tens | Poles |
|---|---|---|
| 1 | 35 | 3 |
- Statistics up to date as of October 28, 2026.

John Kieper (February 2, 1932 – July 30, 2022) was an American professional stock car racing driver and team owner. He was a longtime driver and car owner in the NASCAR Winston West Series.

== Racing career ==
Kieper simultaneously made his NASCAR Grand National Series and NASCAR Pacific Coast Late Model Division debut in 1954 in the second ever Pacific Coast Late Model race at Carrell Speedway, finishing twentieth.

Kieper ran two races in 1955, both combination races, where he finished second at Bay Meadows Speedway and seventeenth at Las Vegas Park Speedway due to a crash.

Kieper ran eight races in 1956, again all combination races, scoring two poles, seven top-tens, and a win at Portland Speedway, his only career win in both series. He finished tenth in the Pacific Coast Late Model standings.

Kieper made two Pacific Coast Late Model starts in 1957, finishing sixteenth at Portland and eighth at the Merced Fairgrounds. The race at Portland was a combination race.

Kieper did not compete in the series again until 1974, where he made four starts in the renamed Winston West Series, scoring a best finish of seventh twice.

Kieper made nine Winston West starts in 1975, scoring six top-tens with a best finish of second at Umatilla Speedway. These starts included two Winston Cup combination races, where he finished twentieth at Riverside International Raceway due to transmission issues and 24th at Ontario Motor Speedway due to engine issues.

In 1976, Kieper competed in seven Winston West races, scoring five top-tens with a best finish of second at Laguna Seca Raceway. In the combination race at Ontario, he finished 35th due to engine issues.

Kieper again ran seven Winston West races in 1977, scoring three top-tens with a best finish of seventh at Yakima Speedway. He made his final Winston Cup start in the combination race at Ontario, finishing 36th due to engine issues.

Kieper made just two Winston West starts in 1978, failing to finish at both Shasta Speedway and Western Speedway. He made his final Winston Cup attempt in the combination race at Ontario, failing to qualify.

In 1979, Kieper ran five Winston West races, scoring his first pole since 1956 at Portland and scoring three top-tens with a best finish of third at Evergreen Speedway.

Kieper again made five starts in 1980, scoring three top-tens as in the year prior with a best result of third again coming at Evergreen.

Kieper ran six races in 1981, scoring two top-tens with a best finish of sixth at Shasta.

Kieper's final season as a driver was 1982, where he made four starts, finishing in the top-ten in his final two starts with a seventh-place finish at Evergreen and an eighth-place finish at Phoenix International Raceway.

== Team ownership ==
All but two of Kieper's career starts came in his own Kieper Racing entry. As an owner, Kieper scored a total of four wins and six poles, with the last win for the team coming in the 1988 Winston 200 with Derrike Cope and the last pole for the team coming with Jim Bown in 1995. Other drivers who competed for the team include Hershel McGriff and Greg Biffle. His son Richard continued running the team from 1997 to 2003.
