= Jim Cook (racing driver) =

American racing driver (1921–1983)

James "Jim" Preston Cook
- Born: October 2, 1921; Illinois, U.S.
- Died: November 29, 1983 (aged 62); Oceanside, California, U.S.
- Cause of death: Murder
- Awards: West Coast Stock Car Hall of Fame (2006)

NASCAR Cup Series career
- 39 races run over 16 years
- Best finish: 45th (1960)
- First race: 1954 Race 6 (Oakland)
- Last race: 1970 Motor Trend 500 (Riverside)
- First win: 1960 Race 37 (Sacramento)
Wins	Top tens	Poles
1	7	1

ARCA Menards Series West career
- 165 races run over 17 years
- Best finish: 3rd (1963, 1967, 1968)
- First race: 1954 Race 1 (Oakland)
- Last race: 1970 Race 9 (Craig Road)
- First win: 1960 Race 12 (Sacramento)
- Last win: 1969 Race 6 (Tri-City)
Wins	Top tens	Poles
5	89	8
- Statistics up to date as of August 13, 2026.

James Preston Cook (October 2, 1921 – November 29, 1983) was an American stock car racing driver who competed in the NASCAR Grand National Series and NASCAR Pacific Coast Late Model Division. Born in Illinois, Cook lived in Boston before relocating west across the United States to Norwalk, California.

== Biography ==
Cook began racing in Boston. He moved to the Western United States in the early 1940s. He had a successful short track racing career in Southern California, primarily driving for owner Floyd Johnson. Cook made 39 starts in the NASCAR Grand National Series from 1954 through 1970. Most of Cook's starts were in West Coast races during the time the races counted for both Grand National and NASCAR Pacific Coast Late Model Division points, though he did compete in the inaugural World 600 at Charlotte Motor Speedway and in the 1964 Daytona 500 and Richmond 250. After this foray, his Grand National starts were limited to an annual start in the Motor Trend 500, then held each January at Riverside International Raceway. He did compete regularly in the Pacific Coast Late Model Series, primarily driving for owners Floyd Johnson or Cos Cancilla, finishing in the top-ten in points eight times between 1956 and 1969, with a best points finish of third on three occasions (1963, 1967 and 1968). He had five career victories in the Pacific Coast Late Model Series, the last one coming at Tri-City Raceway in West Richland, Washington in July 1969.

Cook scored one career win in the NASCAR Grand National Series at California State Fairgrounds in Sacramento, California on September 11, 1960. The 100 mile race took place on the one mile dirt oval. Cook, driving Floyd Johnson's Dodge, edged Scotty Cain's T-Bird.

Cook's racing career came to an end when he was severely injured in a crash during the 1970 Motor Trend 500 at Riverside International Raceway on January 18, 1970. His Ford crashed into the end of the turn 9 wall and he suffered head trauma and many broken bones. He would make one final start in the renamed Grand National West Series at Craig Road Speedway in August, finishing twenty-first after a crash.

After his Riverside accident left him using a wheelchair full-time and with large medical and hospital bills, benefit races were held for Cook at Southern California tracks.

Cook was murdered on November 29, 1983, by a drifter who broke into his Oceanside, California apartment and beat him to death with one of his racing trophies.

In 2006, Cook was inducted into the West Coast Stock Car Hall of Fame.
