= 1954 NASCAR Grand National Series race at Oakland Stadium =

1954 NASCAR Grand National and Pacific Coast Late Model race

1954 Grand National Race 6 / Pacific Coast Late Model Race 1
Race details
- Race 6 of 33 in the 1954 NASCAR Grand National Series season Race 1 of 9 in the 1954 NASCAR Pacific Coast Late Model Division season
- Date: March 28, 1954
- Location: Oakland Stadium in Oakland, California
- Course: Permanent racing facility
- Course length: 0.500 miles (0.805 km)
- Distance: 250 laps, 125 mi (19.312 km)
- Average speed: 50.692 miles per hour (81.581 km/h)
- Attendance: 8,500

Pole position
Driver	Hershel McGriff	Beryl Jackson

Most laps led
Driver	Hershel McGriff	Beryl Jackson
- Laps: 125

Winner
No. 3	Dick Rathmann	Ray Erickson

On March 28, 1954, the sixth race of the 1954 NASCAR Grand National Series and first race of the 1954 NASCAR Pacific Coast Late Model Division, the first ever race of the Pacific Coast Late Model Division, was held at Oakland Stadium, a 0.500 mile (0.805 km) oval track in Oakland, California. At the time of the race, the track was a mix between a dirt track and a paved track. A combination race between the series, it was won by Dick Rathmann, his first win of the Grand National season. In winning, he became the first winner in what is now the ARCA Menards Series West. Marvin Panch finished in second and John Soares rounded out the podium in third.

Race winner Dick Rathmann missed qualifying due to not yet arriving at the track and had to start in last place. On the twenty-first lap after, driver Bill Weiman tore the right rear wheel off his car and flipped three times; it appeared as if he had been crushed during the last two flips, but escaped the accident and was not seriously injured. The wreck brought out the first ever yellow flag in the Pacific Coast Late Model Division and the only one of the race. Polesitter Hershel McGriff dominated the opening 120 laps before being the fifth driver to encounter tie rod issues due to the condition of the track's turns; he lost the lead to Marvin Panch on lap 126 and retired from the event by lap 130. Panch led the race until making a pit stop due to an overheating radiator. Rathmann would score the win by a lap over Panch before running out of fuel 200 feet after crossing the finish line.

== Report ==
Oakland Stadium was a 5/8 mile (later 1/2 mile) track located in Oakland, California. The track had banking of 45 degrees on one side and 62 degrees on the other and held racing events between 1946 and 1955 that featured Big Cars, Sprints, Midgets, Roadsters, and Hardtops, as well as NASCAR.

=== Entry list ===
#	Driver	Owner	Make
1	Clyde Palmer	Al Neves	'51 Mercury
3	Dick Rathmann	Ray Erickson	'52 Hudson
4	John Soares	Charles Vance	'54 Dodge
7	Jim Heath	Allen Heath	'54 Ford
8	Sam Hawks	Jack Beumer	'53 Dodge
9	Hershel McGriff	Beryl Jackson	'54 Oldsmobile
11	Dick Carter	Dick Carter	'51 Dodge
12	Ben Gregory	Don Oliver	'53 Oldsmobile
14	Bill Weiman	Unknown	'51 Oldsmobile
15	Cliff Roberts	Chet Chirso	'50 Plymouth
18	Lloyd Dane	Lloyd Dane	'50 Oldsmobile
21	Bill Amick	Carmen Amica	'54 Oldsmobile
21x	Bill Williams	Unknown	'50 Plymouth
23	Richard Brown	Unknown	'52 Oldsmobile
24	Bob Havemann	Bob Havenmann	'54 Ford
33	Bill Stammer	Bill Stammer	'53 Pontiac
36	Vee Dent	Vee Dent	'52 Hudson
38	Art Watts	Joe Fisher	'53 Dodge
42	Lee Petty	Petty Enterprises	'54 Dodge
44	H. R. Kahl	Unknown	'52 Plymouth
48	Paul Phipps	Les Brand	'51 Mercury
51	Rick Henderson	Ray Henderson	'51 Chevrolet
84	Robert Caswell	Lou Mangini	'54 Dodge
88	Woody Brown	Joe Mangini	'50 Oldsmobile
90	Jim Cook	Arley Scranton	'50 Ford
98	Marvin Panch	Beryl Jackson	'54 Dodge
99	Joe Valente	Joe Mangini	'50 Oldsmobile

== Practice and Qualifying ==
A one-hour practice session was held, followed by qualifying. Hershel McGriff won the pole with a speed of 55.624 mph. Vee Dent flipped in qualifying and was treated for facial lacerations before being released from a hospital. He was the only driver who failed to qualify for the race. Dick Rathmann, who missed qualifying, had a bracket break on his gas tank and borrowed the gas tank from Dent's wrecked car in order to start the race.

== Race results ==
Fin	St	#	Driver	Owner	Make	Laps	Led	Status
1	26	3	Dick Rathmann	Ray Erickson	'52 Hudson	250	108	Running
2	5	98	Marvin Panch	Beryl Jackson	'54 Dodge	249	17	Running
3	3	4	John Soares	Charles Vance	'54 Dodge	247	0	Running
4	11	1	Clyde Palmer	Al Neves	'51 Mercury	238	0	Running
5	9	18	Lloyd Dane	Lloyd Dane	'50 Oldsmobile	234	0	Running
6	2	42	Lee Petty	Petty Enterprises	'54 Dodge	232	0	Running
7	10	8	Sam Hawks	Jack Beumer	'53 Dodge	230	0	Running
8	19	24	Bob Havemann	Bob Havenmann	'54 Ford	228	0	Running
9	18	7	Jim Heath	Allen Heath	'54 Ford	226	0	Running
10	20	90	Jim Cook	Arley Scranton	'50 Ford	226	0	Running
11	4	12	Ben Gregory	Don Oliver	'53 Oldsmobile	222	0	Tie Rod
12	8	99	Joe Valente	Joe Mangini	'50 Oldsmobile	220	0	Tie Rod
13	23	51	Rick Henderson	Ray Henderson	'51 Chevrolet	217	0	Running
14	12	84	Robert Caswell	Lou Mangini	'54 Dodge	210	0	Running
15	17	15	Cliff Roberts	Chet Chiroso	'50 Plymouth	194	0	Running
16	16	33	Bill Stammer	Bill Stammer	'53 Pontiac	190	0	Running
17	24	44	H. R. Kahl	Unknown	'52 Plymouth	174	0	Running
18	25	11	Dick Carter	Dick Carter	'51 Dodge	171	0	Running
19	14	48	Paul Phipps	Les Brand	'51 Mercury	167	0	Running
20	1	9	Hershel McGriff	Beryl Jackson	'54 Oldsmobile	129	125	Tie Rod
21	7	21	Bill Amick	Carmen Amica	'54 Oldsmobile	124	0	Tie Rod
22	21	23	Richard Brown	Unknown	'52 Oldsmobile	118	0	Tie Rod
23	22	21x	Bill Williams	Unknown	'50 Plymouth	113	0	Running
24	13	88	Wood Brown	Joe Mangini	'50 Oldsmobile	52	0	Tie Rod
25	6	38	Art Watts	Joe Fishr	'53 Dodge	52	0	Tie Rod
26	15	14	Bill Weiman	Unknown	'51 Oldsmobile	20	0	Accident

Previous race: 1954 NASCAR Grand National Series race at Oglethorpe Speedway	NASCAR Grand National Series; 1954 season	Next race: 1954 Wilkes County 160

Previous race: None	NASCAR Pacific Coast Late Model Division; 1954 season	Next race: 1954 NASCAR Grand National Series race at Carrell Speedway
