= 1957 NASCAR Grand National Series =

American motorsport season

Seasons
- ← 1956 1958 →

The 1957 NASCAR Grand National Series saw driver Buck Baker win his second consecutive NASCAR Grand National Series championship. Baker won the championship with 10,716 points over second place driver Marvin Panch (9,956), and Speedy Thompson (8,560). Baker was the first driver to win back-to-back NASCAR championships. Baker accumulated $30,764 for his efforts in the 1957 NASCAR season. Ken Rush was Rookie of the Year, and Fireball Roberts took home the Most Popular Driver Award.

This was the last season until the 1993 season without Richard Petty.

== Overview ==
In February 1957 the first '57 Chevy, affectionately known as the 'Black Widow' made its debut in NASCAR at the Daytona Beach and Road Course. Throughout the year drivers Buck Baker, Marvin Panch, Fireball Roberts, Larry Frank, Speedy Thompson, and Bob Welborn would pilot these now classic vehicles.

Early in the 1957 season the Automobile Manufacturers Association (AMA) stated that its members should become less involved in motor sports. After an incident in the May 20 Virginia 500 at Martinsville Speedway that injured five spectators, including a young boy, ended the race with 59 laps remaining, Ford, General Motors and Chrysler became less passionate about providing financial and administrative support for the teams. On June 6 the auto manufactures withdrew their backing from the sport. Late in the season at the North Wilkesboro Speedway, a wheel from driver Tiny Lund's car was thrown into stands, and a spectator was killed. (There were no wheel tethers installed in NASCAR until a series of open wheel racing fatalities in the late 1990s at Michigan and Charlotte from wheels hurled into stands from crashes.)

On November 27, 1957, construction began on a new race track now known as Daytona International Speedway after five years of negotiations. The ground-breaking ceremony took place one month to the day after Buck Baker won the final event of the season at Central Carolina Fairgrounds in Greensboro, N.C; thus securing his second consecutive championship.

== Season recap ==
The 1957 season opened at the Willow Springs Speedway in Lancaster, California. Marvin Panch won the event, and followed that with a second consecutive win at the following event at the Concord Speedway late in 1956. Fireball Roberts, Cotton Owens, Jack Smith, and Ralph Moody all notched wins during the next four events before Buck Baker took his first trip to victory lane at Hillsboro, North Carolina in March 1957.

On February 17 Pontiac gathered its first-ever NASCAR win at Daytona Beach with Cotton Owens at the wheel. In May, a scheduled 500 lap race at Martinsville Speedway was halted after 441 circuits due to a crash. On June 6 all factory supported teams disbanded as American auto manufactures withdrew their support from NASCAR.

During the Eighth Annual Southern 500 on September 2, driver Bobby Myers was killed in a crash on lap 28 at Darlington Raceway. Speedy Thompson went on to win that first race to average over 100 mph at the track. On October 12, 1957, Fireball Roberts won a 100-mile race at Newberry Speedway; and the event holds the dubious distinction of having the smallest crowd in NASCAR history as only 900 spectators looked on.

When the season had ended, 18 drivers had won at least one Grand National event.

== The AMA: All in, and all out. ==
The 50s can be seen as the building blocks of NASCAR. Automobile speeds increased at a rapid rate, and an example of that can be seen in the events at the Daytona Beach road course. The inaugural 1952 event had a pole speed of 64.7 mph, and by the final event 4 years later in 1956, the speed had risen to a blazing 81 mph. The horsepower race was in full swing, but the leaders of the AMA had concerns. Rising speeds on the track meant higher speeds on the nation's highways; and the fatality rate of America's public was on the rise. NASCAR attempted to appease the AMA, and disallowed the use of superchargers and fuel injection in their sanctioned events. NASCAR also refused to allow the Detroit manufactures to use their race results with media advertisements. Still, the major auto manufactures continued to invest time and money in NASCAR.
Detroit auto manufactures saw NASCAR as a big business opportunity, and by the beginning of the 1957 season, GM, Ford, Mercury, and Plymouth were all backing one team or another. Press agents were hired, and people worked to increase publicity through newspapers, radio, TV and other media venues. It all came to a halt on May 19, 1957, when a race accident injured not just drivers, but spectators as well. Included in the injuries was an 8-year-old boy, Alvia Helsabeck. Driver Billy Myers crashed his Mercury through the Martinsville Speedway fence during the Virginia 500, and landed in an area marked "off limits" to spectators, and young Helsabeck lost his life. Myers had been trying to lap Tom Pistone when the two cars tangled on lap 441. Four other fans in the "No Spectators Allowed" area ages 19 to 44 were also injured. The race was red flagged, and Buck Baker was called the winner. As ambulances transported the injured to local hospitals, the weather turned to rain.
On June 6 the AMA leadership voted unanimously to withdraw all auto manufacture support, not just from the NASCAR Grand National series, but from all forms of auto racing. Factory sponsored teams were eliminated, and the equipment given to the individual owners and drivers.

== 1957 final standings ==
- references

Finish	Driver	Races	Wins	Poles	Points	Earnings
1	Buck Baker	40	10	6	10,716	$30,763
2	Marvin Panch	42	6	4	9956	$24,307
3	Speedy Thompson	38	2	4	8580	$26,841
4	Lee Petty	38	2	4	8528	$18,325
5	Jack Smith	40	4	2	8464	$14,561
6	Fireball Roberts	42	8	4	8268	$19,828
7	Johnny Allen	42	0	1	7068	$9,814
8	L. D. Austin	40	0	0	6532	$6,485
9	Brownie King	36	0	0	5740	$5,589
10	Jim Paschal	35	0	0	5136	$4,999

== Race results ==
D Dirt oval
P Paved oval
R Road course
T Temporary circuit

No	Date	Track	Track type		Winner
No	Date	Track	Pavement/shape	Length category	Winner
1	11/11/1956	Willow Springs Raceway (Willow Springs, CA)	R road course	intermediate/standard	Marvin Panch
2	12/2/1956	Concord Motor Speedway (Midland, NC)	D dirt oval	short track	Marvin Panch
3	12/30/1956	Titusville-Cocoa Airport (Titusville, FL)	T paved temporary circuit	short/tight	Fireball Roberts
4	2/17/1957	Daytona Beach Road Course (Daytona Beach Shores, FL)	T paved/dirt temporary oval circuit	long/high speed	Cotton Owens
5	3/3/1957	Concord Motor Speedway (Midland, NC)	D dirt oval	short track	Jack Smith
6	3/17/1957	Wilson Speedway (Wilson, NC)	D dirt oval	short track	Ralph Moody
7	3/24/1957	Occoneechee Speedway (Orange County, NC)	D dirt oval	short track	Buck Baker
8	3/31/1957	Asheville-Weaverville Speedway (Weaverville, NC)	D dirt oval	short track	Buck Baker
9	4/7/1957	North Wilkesboro Speedway (North Wilkesboro, NC)	D dirt oval	short track	Fireball Roberts
10	4/14/1957	Langhorne Speedway (Langhorne, PA)	D dirt oval	short track	Fireball Roberts
11	4/19/1957	Southern States Fairgrounds (Charlotte, NC)	D dirt oval	short track	Fireball Roberts
12	4/27/1957	Piedmont Interstate Fairgrounds (Spartanburg County, SC)	D dirt oval	short track	Marvin Panch
13	4/28/1957	Greensboro Agricultural Fairgrounds (Greensboro, NC)	D dirt oval	short track	Paul Goldsmith
14	4/28/1957	Portland Speedway (Portland, OR)	P paved oval	short track	Art Watts
15	5/4/1957	Cleveland County Fairgrounds (Shelby, NC)	D dirt oval	short track	Fireball Roberts
16	5/5/1957	Richmond International Raceway (Richmond, VA)	D dirt oval	short track	Paul Goldsmith
17	5/19/1957 (report)	Martinsville Speedway (Ridgeway, VA)	P paved oval	short track	Buck Baker
18	5/26/1957	Portland Speedway (Portland, OR)	P paved oval	short track	Eddie Pagan
19	5/30/1957	Eureka Speedway (Eureka, CA)	D dirt oval	short track	Lloyd Dane
20	5/30/1957	Oxford Plains Speedway (Oxford, ME)	P paved oval	short track	Buck Baker
21	6/1/1957	Lancaster Speedway (Lancaster, SC)	D dirt oval	short track	Paul Goldsmith
22	6/8/1957	Ascot Park (Los Angeles, CA)	D dirt oval	short track	Eddie Pagan
23	6/15/1957	Tennessee-Carolina Speedway (Newport, TN)	D dirt oval	short track	Fireball Roberts
24	6/20/1957	Columbia Speedway (Columbia, SC)	D dirt oval	short track	Jack Smith
25	6/22/1957	California State Fairgrounds (Sacramento, CA)	D dirt oval	intermediate	Bill Amick
26	6/29/1957	Piedmont Interstate Fairgrounds (Spartanburg County, SC)	D dirt oval	short track	Lee Petty
27	6/30/1957	Jacksonville Speedway (Jacksonville, NC	D dirt oval	short track	Buck Baker
28	7/4/1957	Raleigh Speedway (Raleigh, NC)	P paved oval	intermediate	Paul Goldsmith
29	7/12/1957	Southern States Fairgrounds (Charlotte, NC)	D dirt oval	short track	Marvin Panch
30	7/14/1957	Memphis-Arkansas Speedway (LeHi, AR)	D dirt oval	intermediate	Marvin Panch
31	7/14/1957	Portland Speedway (Portland, OR)	P paved oval	short track	Eddie Pagan
32	7/20/1957	Hickory Speedway (Hickory, NC)	D dirt oval	short track	Jack Smith
33	7/24/1957	Norfolk Speedway (Norfolk, VA)	D dirt oval	short track	Buck Baker
34	7/30/1957	Lancaster Speedway (Lancaster, SC)	D dirt oval	short track	Speedy Thompson
35	8/4/1957	Watkins Glen International (Watkins Glen, NY)	R road course	intermediate/standard	Buck Baker
36	8/4/1957	Bremerton National Airport (Bremerton, WA)	T temporary circuit	short/tight	Parnelli Jones
37	8/10/1957	Lincoln Speedway (New Oxford, PA)	D dirt oval	short track	Marvin Panch
38	8/16/1957	Old Bridge Stadium (Old Bridge Township, NJ)	P paved oval	short track	Lee Petty
39	8/26/1957	Coastal Speedway (Myrtle Beach, SC)	D dirt oval	short track	Gwyn Staley
40	9/2/1957 (report)	Darlington Raceway (Darlington, SC)	P paved oval	intermediate	Speedy Thompson
41	9/5/1957	Syracuse Mile (Syracuse, NY)	D dirt oval	intermediate	Gwyn Staley
42	9/8/1957	Asheville-Weaverville Speedway (Weaverville, NC)	D dirt oval	short track	Lee Petty
43	9/8/1957	California State Fairgrounds (Sacramento, CA)	D dirt oval	intermediate	Danny Graves
44	9/15/1957	Santa Clara County Fairgrounds (San Jose, CA)	D dirt oval	short track	Marvin Porter
45	9/15/1957	Langhorne Speedway (Langhorne, PA)	D dirt oval	short track	Gwyn Staley
46	9/19/1957	Columbia Speedway (Columbia, SC)	D dirt oval	short track	Buck Baker
47	9/21/1957	Cleveland County Fairgrounds (Shelby, NC)	D dirt oval	short track	Buck Baker
48	10/5/1957	Southern States Fairgrounds (Charlotte, NC)	D dirt oval	short track	Lee Petty
49	10/6/1957	Martinsville Speedway (Ridgeway, VA)	P paved oval	short track	Bob Welborn
50	10/12/1957	Newberry Speedway (SC)	D dirt oval	short track	Fireball Roberts
51	10/13/1957	Concord Motor Speedway (Midland, NC)	D dirt oval	short track	Fireball Roberts
52	10/20/1957	North Wilkesboro Speedway (North Wilkesboro, NC)	P paved oval	short track	Jack Smith
53	10/27/1957	Greensboro Agricultural Fairgrounds (Greensboro, NC)	D dirt oval	short track	Buck Baker

== Bibliography ==
- Fleischman, Bill; Pearce, Al (2004). "12. At A Glance; 1957". The Unauthorized NASCAR Fan Guide 2004 (10 ed.). Canton, MI: Checkered Flag Press; Visible Ink Press. ISBN 0-681-27587-1.
- Fielden, Greg (2015). Bryan Hallman (ed.). NASCAR the complete history (7th ed.). Lincolnwood, IL: Publications International Ltd. p. 97. ISBN 978-1-4508-9994-9.
- Fielden, Greg (1993). "All". Forty Years of Stock Car Racing The Beginning 1949-1958 (Revised 3rd ed.). USA: Garfield Press. p. 336. ISBN 0-9621580-2-X.
- Sowers, Richard (2000). The Complete Statistical History of Stock-Car Racing. Phoenix, AZ: David Bull Publishing. p. 426. ISBN 1-893618-06-4.
