= Huntington Beach Speedway =

Former race track in California

- Location: Huntington Beach, California, United States
- Capacity: 17,000
- Opened: 1946
- Closed: May 1958
- Construction cost: US$200,000
- Former names: Beach Speedway; Talbert Stadium; Huntington Beach Stadium; American Legion Stadium

Oval
- Length: .20 miles
- Turns: 4

Huntington Beach Speedway (later called Beach Speedway, Talbert Stadium, Huntington Beach Stadium, and American Legion Stadium) was a motorsports racetrack located in Huntington Beach, California. Designed to host midget car racing, the venue also featured motorcycle races as well as auto polo and other forms of motorsports. The racetrack operated from 1946 until May 1958 when it closed due to dwindling attendance.

== History ==
In 1946, Tom Talbert purchased 60 acres (0.24 km^{2}) of land west of Beach Blvd and south of Atlanta Avenue in Huntington Beach, CA. Two promoters convinced Talbert to build a midget car racetrack on the property. The track would be 1/5th of a mile oval track modeled after Gilmore Stadium in Los Angeles and was designed to be the "finest midget car racetrack on the West Coast." With a capacity to hold 17,000 spectators, the stadium cost $200,000 to construct. As television became more popular in the 1950s, attendance began to decline and the stadium began to deteriorate. In May 1958, Talbert closed the speedway. A series of condominiums now occupies the site.
