= Eddie Pagan =

American racing driver (1918–1984)

- Born: August 1, 1918; Midland, Texas, U.S.
- Died: August 1, 1984 (aged 66); Harrisburg, North Carolina, U.S.
- Awards: West Coast Stock Car Hall of Fame (2003)

NASCAR Cup Series career
- 62 races run over 9 years
- Best finish: 9th (1958)
- First race: 1954 Race 16 (Gardena)
- Last race: 1963 Riverside 500 (Riverside)
- First win: 1956 Race 39 (San Mateo)
- Last win: 1957 Race 31 (Portland)
Wins	Top tens	Poles
4	38	6

Eddie Pagan (August 1, 1918 – August 1, 1984) was an American stock car racing driver. Pagan was born in Midland, Texas on August 1, 1918. According to an entry in the 1940 U.S. Census, Pagan was living in New Mexico with his wife Marian by the year 1940. Pagan also lived a significant portion of his adult life in Lynwood, California. He competed in 54 NASCAR Grand National West Series races from 1954 to 1957. Pagan had nine West Series wins, 41 top-tens, and 11 pole positions.

Pagan competed in 62 NASCAR Grand National Series races between 1954 and 1963. During his time at NASCAR's highest level, he won four races, achieved 38 top-tens, and six pole positions.

During the 1958 Darlington Southern 500, Pagan had a massive crash. The crash has since become knows as the Eddie Pagan Flip.

In 1971, Pagan co-founded Hutcherson-Pagan Enterprises with Dick Hutcherson, a company that built race cars for drivers such as Darrell Waltrip and A. J. Foyt.

Pagan died August 1, 1984, in Harrisburg, North Carolina.
