= Lloyd Dane =

American racing driver (1925–2015)

- Born: August 9, 1925; Eldon, Missouri, U.S.
- Died: December 11, 2015 (aged 90)
- Achievements: 3× NASCAR Pacific Coast Late Model Division Champion (1954, 1956, 1957)
- Awards: West Coast Stock Car Hall of Fame (2002 - Inaugural Class)

NASCAR Cup Series career
- 52 races run over 11 years
- Best finish: 21st (1958)
- First race: 1951 Race 4 (Gardena)
- Last race: 1964 Motor Trend 500 (Riverside)
- First win: 1951 Race 32 (Sacramento)
- Last win: 1961 Budweiser 400 (Riverside)
Wins	Top tens	Poles
4	36	1

ARCA Menards Series West career
- 136 races run over 12 years
- Best finish: 1st (1954, 1956, 1957)
- First race: 1954 Race 1 (Oakland)
- Last race: 1965 California 100 (Sacramento)
- First win: 1956 Race 17 (Sacramento)
- Last win: 1961 Race 13 (Antioch)
Wins	Top tens	Poles
12	103	2
- Statistics up to date as of October 15, 2026.

Lloyd Dane (August 19, 1925 – December 11, 2015) was an American NASCAR Grand National Series driver from Eldon, Missouri. He participated part-time in the 1951 and 1954 to 1964 seasons, capturing four wins, all in his own car. Two of Dane's wins came during the 1956 season, when he finished 23rd in points.

Dane first started racing in 1949 and was the first NASCAR Pacific Coast Late Model Series champion; he took the championship in 1954, 1956 and 1957. He was noted for driving a Hudson Hornet, which he drove to his 1954 championship, along with longtime friend Tim Flock.
