= Danny Letner =

American racecar driver (1928–2018)

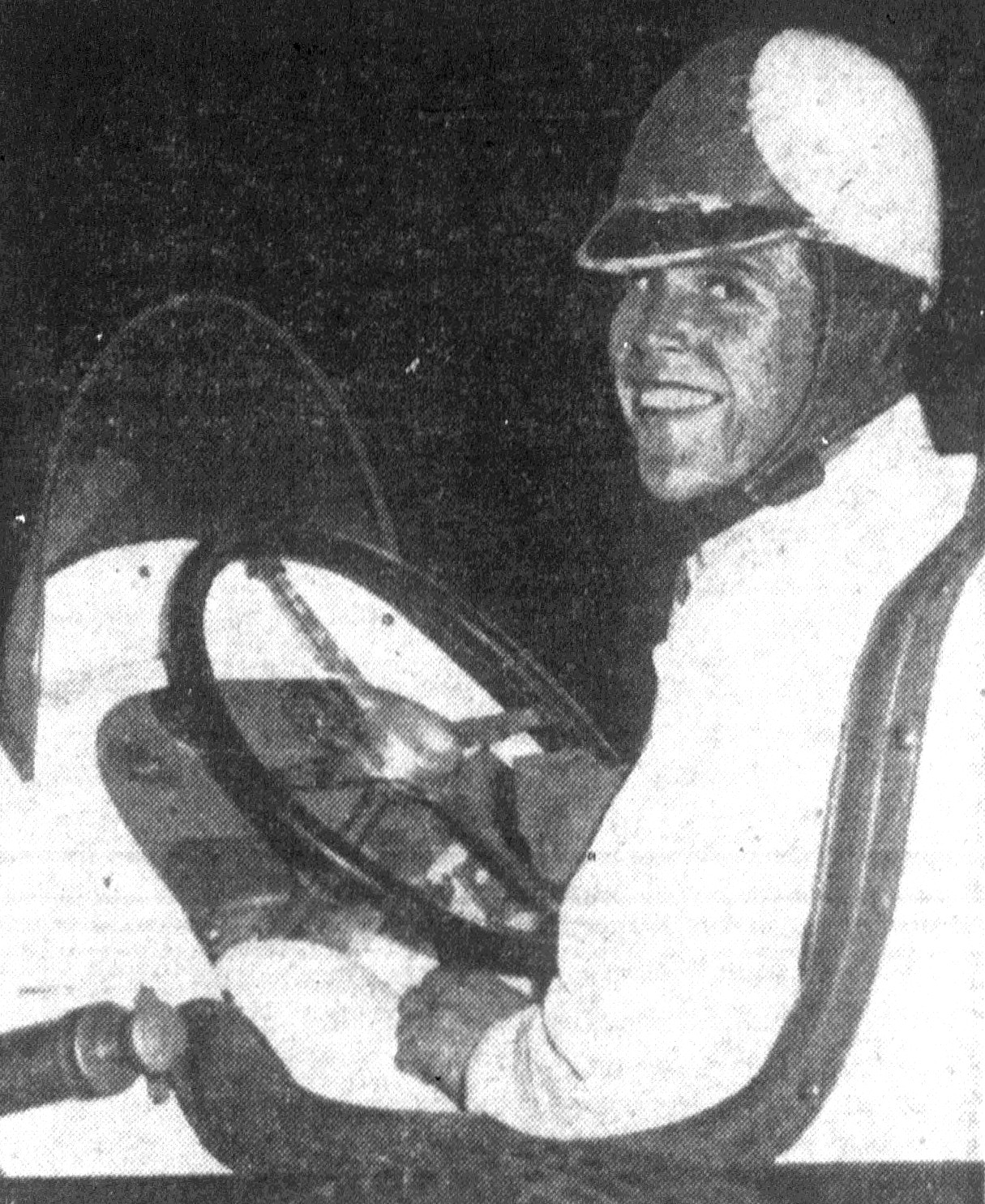
- Letner, circa 1954
- Born: January 3, 1928; Downey, California, U.S.
- Died: March 30, 2018 (aged 90); Orange, California, U.S.
- Awards: West Coast Stock Car Hall of Fame (2002 - Inaugural Class)

NASCAR Cup Series career
- 27 races run over 8 years
- Best finish: 33rd (1954 NASCAR Grand National Series)
- First race: 1951 Race 4 (Carrell Speedway)
- Last race: 1963 Riverside 500 (Riverside International Raceway)
- First win: 1954 Race 27 (Oakland Stadium)
- Last win: 1955 Race 14 (Tucson Rodeo Grounds)
Wins	Top tens	Poles
2	10	1

Danny Lewis Letner (January 3, 1928 – March 30, 2018) was an American racecar driver who won two races in what is now the NASCAR Cup Series.

== Career ==
In 1951, Letner ran five NASCAR Grand National Division races in cars owned by his father, Bert. He earned two top-fives that year with a best finish of eighth. Letner then competed in a handful of races each year from 1954 to 1957, adding seven more top-tens, including wins at Oakland Stadium and Tucson Speedway.

In 1954, Letner won two races and finished in second place in the NASCAR Pacific Coast Late Model standings. The next year, he won three races en route to a championship in his only full-time season. He won three of the twelve races he entered in 1957, his final season in the series.

In 1956, Letner ran 23 races in the inaugural season of the short-lived NASCAR Convertible Division, winning at Langhorne Speedway.

Letner retired from stock car racing in the early 1960s, but later took up off-road racing. He won the SCORE Parker 400 in 1989 at the age of 61, and would go on to finish tied for second in the championship standings that year.

In 2002, Letner was inducted into the first class of the West Coast Stock Car Hall of Fame.

== Personal life ==
Letner was born in Downey, California. His son Marty and grandsons Kory and Harley have also competed in off-road racing.
