= Oakland Speedway =

American race track

Coordinates: 37.7005°N 122.1268°W

The Oakland Speedway was a motor racing track in San Leandro, California, a suburb of Oakland, California. It was a one-mile, banked dirt oval track built in 1931, which operated throughout the Great Depression and postwar years. The track featured AAA National Championship races with Indy cars and drivers from 1931 until 1936, when the AAA pulled out of the West Coast. Thereafter the track still featured racing by members of the Bay Cities Racing Association, in roadsters and motorcycles, as well as Big Cars, stock cars, and midgets. It was known as the "fastest dirt track in the Nation".

== History ==
In 1931 the Oakland Speedway was built near Oakland, but actually was located between Oakland and nearby Hayward, California, on the site of what is now Bayfair Mall in San Leandro, California.

Annually each fall the track hosted the "Oakland 500" race. Many of the local East Bay races were exhibited by the Bay Cities Racing Association. In 1948 local East Bay driver Bob Barkhimer quit racing to become the business manager for the racing association. In 1949 Barkhimer took over San Jose Speedway and also started his own association, and in 1954 he co-founded west coast NASCAR.

Among top drivers who were killed at the Oakland Speedway was Clyde Rea Bray, who had held second place in the A.R.A. points in 1939, behind champion Wally Schock. Bray had come in 5th in the Oakland "500" that year. Two years later, on Labor Day, 1941, during the Oakland Speedway 500 race, on the 356th lap, Bray was fatally injured after being thrown from his car, after it sailed over the south fence.

Among legendary top race drivers who got their start at the Oakland Speedway was Bob Sweikert, the 1955 Indianapolis 500 winner. On Memorial Day, May 26, 1947 at the Oakland Speedway, Sweikert drove his own handbuilt track roadster in his debut race for prize money, and finished second.

Championship motorcycle races were also held at the Oakland Speedway. The American Motorcycle Association sanctioned 200-mile nationals for 1935, 1938, 1939, 1940 and 1941. They were won, respectively, by Jimmy Young, Sam Arena, Jack Cottrell/Armando Magri, Louis Guanella and Ernie Holbrook. All winners rode Harley-Davidsons, except Holbrook, who won on an Indian.

But for motorcycles, the track was notoriously unsafe. It was full of sand that flew up into your face, and little chunks of clotted, oiled dirt were missing along the straightaways. On warm afternoons, the top of the banked curves would sweat oil, which oozed down onto the track's lower sections, making some parts slippery while others buckled-up. "You had to find the right groove, and stay in it," said Armando Magri's brother Ernie, who rode practice laps but did not compete. "It was flat-out dangerous," said Magri.

The Oakland Speedway claimed scores of injuries, and ultimately, the lives of four motorcycle racers. The first was Dick Ince, the millionaire son of Hollywood Director Thomas Ince, in 1938. Tommy Hayes and June McCall died in a multi-rider accident in 1940, and Gus Hunter died in October 1941. After that race, Oakland Tribune columnist Alan Ward called for the end of motorcycle racing on the track. But two months later, there would be no more racing at all. Oakland Speedway lost its lease just as America entered World War II.

== Other local tracks ==
In the early 1930s, Emeryville Motorcycle Speedway was built on 53rd Street in nearby Emeryville, California, on the present site of the Emery Bay Village residential and shopping center.

Another rival 1930s motorcycle track was Neptune Beach Speedway, on the Alameda, California bay shoreline.

A later local venue similar to the Oakland Speedway was Oakland Stadium, a 5/8 mile track, with a banking of 62 degrees, held racing events between 1946 and 1955 that featured Big Cars, Sprints, Midgets, Roadsters, and Hardtops. Before he moved up to the sprint cars, Bob Sweikert won a 50 lap feature in his Thompson Motors Special Roadster at that venue on October 17, 1948. In October 1949 he set the new one lap track record there at 20.78 seconds in a V8 Special. Surprisingly, there were no driver fatalities at this race track even with the extreme banking in the turns.

Another local venue was the downtown Oakland Indoor Midget Race Track, the only one west of Chicago. It was built inside the converted Exhibition Building, and featured a small 1/12 mile oval track, and became the site of featured races by the Bay Cities Racing Association, with the debut event on January 8, 1949. Bob Sweikert won that Indoor Midget championship that year with the concluding event on February 12, 1949.
