= 1956 Wilkes County 160 =

Auto race run at North Wilkesboro Speedway in 1956

Race details
- Race 10 of 56 in the 1956 NASCAR Grand National Series season
- North Wilkesboro Speedway
- Date: April 8, 1956
- Official name: Wilkes County 160
- Location: North Wilkesboro Speedway, North Wilkesboro, North Carolina
- Course: Permanent racing facility
- Course length: 0.625 miles (1.00 km)
- Distance: 160 laps, 100 mi (160 km)
- Weather: Cold with temperatures of 51.1 °F (10.6 °C); wind speeds of 19 miles per hour (31 km/h)
- Average speed: 71.034 mph (114.318 km/h)
- Attendance: 7,500

Pole position
Driver	Junior Johnson	A.L. Bumgarner

Most laps led
Driver	Speedy Thompson	Carl Kiekhaefer
- Laps: 97

Winner
No. 300A	Tim Flock	Carl Kiekhaefer

Television in the United States
- Network: untelevised
- Announcers: none

The 1956 Wilkes County 160 was a NASCAR Grand National Series event that was held on April 8, 1956, at North Wilkesboro Speedway in North Wilkesboro, North Carolina, United States.

== Background ==
North Wilkesboro carried a reputation as one of the fastest short-tracks in auto racing in the late 1940s and 1950s. In 1950, speeds reached 73 mph at the track, compared to the next fastest short-track, Charlotte Speedway, where top speeds only reached 66 mph. Most of the fans in the early years of the sport saw the track as notorious for being a great venue to watch races between the legendary racers of the time. Racing at North Wilkesboro was intense and physical.

The 1950 Wilkes 200 was the second Grand National Series race held at North Wilkesboro Speedway. Twenty-six cars entered the race. Twenty-one-year-old Fireball Roberts qualified with a lap speed of 73.266 mph on the dirt track for his first-ever Grand National pole, but engine problems dropped him out of the running. Fonty Flock started in the third position and led the most laps in the race with 104, but engine troubles also ended his day. Ultimately, Leon Sales led eight of the 200 laps to become the victor, the fourth NASCAR driver to win an event in his debut race. Jack Smith finished second after leading 55 laps in the race.

After hosting only one NASCAR event in 1949 and one in 1950, the track began running two Grand National Series events per year in 1951 (with the except for 1956, when only one race was held; the track was being prepared for pavement). One race was held in the spring, normally in late March or early April, and another was held in the fall, normally in late September or early October. In 1957, owner Enoch Stanley had the 5/8-mile track paved.

The Wilkes 200 in 1952 turned into a battle between brothers. Two sets of brothers competed in the race, and they took the top four spots at the finish. The Flock Brothers (Fonty Flock and Tim Flock) were strong, but the Thomas brothers (Herb Thomas and Donald Thomas) had a better outcome. Herb Thomas, driving his 1952 "Fabulous" Hudson Hornet, won the pole, led 192 of the 200 laps, and grabbed the victory. Fonty Flock led the first eight laps and finished the race second. Donald Thomas, also in a 1952 "Fabulous" Hudson Hornet, finished third, and Tim Flock finished fourth. Eleven of the 27 cars entered the race finished. Six of the top nine positions were driving Hudson Hornets.

Herb Thomas started on the pole for the 1953 Wilkes 200 with his record-setting qualifying speed of 78.424 mph on the dirt surface. Outside pole sitter Tim Flock led the first 100 laps before experiencing engine problems. Curtis Turner took the lead on Lap 101 and continued the lead until his car also succumbed to engine troubles nine laps later. Thomas in his Number 92 Hudson Hornet only lead 18 laps in the race, but ended the race by taking his third consecutive win at North Wilkesboro. Starting from the third spot, Dick Rathmann led 70 laps and finished behind Herb Thomas. Fonty Flock managed to work his way up from the fourth starting position to the front and led three laps before dropping back and finishing third.

Pole sitter Buck Baker ran 78.288 mph to gap the pole for the 1953 Wilkes 160. Baker ran strong and led the most laps in the race with 80 out front before falling back into the sixth position at the finish. Speedy Thompson led 25 laps, and Fonty Flock led 37. Curtis Turner led a total of 18 laps. At the end of the race, Thompson finished two laps ahead of second-place Flock. Thompson's win ended Herb Thomas and his Hudson Hornet's three-race winning streak at North Wilkesboro.

At the 1954 Wilkes County 160, Gober Sosebee won the pole with a lap speed of 78.698 mph. Sosebee led a race-high 112 laps, but finished in 12th position, eight laps down. The only other leader was Dick Rathmann, who led 48 laps. Rathmann blew a tire while leading, with three laps to go, and still managed to finish and win the race. Herb Thomas finished some 20 seconds behind in second place.

In the 1954 Wilkes 160, Hershel McGriff won the pole with a qualifying speed of 77.612 mph. He and Dick Rathman were the only leaders of the race; McGriff led 74 laps, and Rathman led 83. The race was called three laps early because of a serious crash involving Lou Figaro; his car flipped, and the roof caved in. Figaro was transported to a hospital in Winston-Salem, but he died the following day from a skull fracture and brain damage suffered in the crash. McGriff was declared the winner. It was his final victory and his last Grand National race for 17 years.

Dink Widenhouse won his only career Grand National Series pole at the 1955 Wilkes County 160. But engine problems forced him out of the race. Outside pole sitter Buck Baker led all 160 laps, but by the last lap, Dick Rathmann was glued to Baker's bumper, still charging. Rathmann's final charge off of Turn Four came up three feet short of stealing the victory. It was the closest finish in series history up to that time. Local native Junior Johnson ran in his first Grand National race at North Wilkesboro.

== Race report ==
The attendance at the race was 7500 people, and the race was held in one hour, twenty-four minutes, and twenty-eight seconds. There were 160 laps on the .625-mile (1.006 km) dirt track, with the total distance being 100 miles (160 km). The average speed was 71.034 miles per hour (114.318 km/h), and the pole position speed was 78.37 miles per hour (126.12 km/h). The top three qualifiers were the only drivers who lead the race.

The top ten finishers of the race were Tim Flock, Billy Myers, Jim Paschal, Herb Thomas, Ralph Moody, Dink Widenhouse, Allen Adkins, Lee Petty, Bill Blair, and Whitey Norman. Some other notable racers were Fireball Roberts, Buck Baker, Gwyn Staley, Junior Johnson, and Tiny Lund.

Dick Beaty (who finished twelfth in the race) would go on to become the "top cop" in NASCAR decades later; passing a rule requiring vehicles to "pass to the right" on the restart. This race would be John McVitty's last start. He was killed during qualifying at Langhorne before the next race.

Out of the twenty-nine competitors for this race, thirteen failed to finish, leaving sixteen drivers that completed the entire 160 laps (100 miles) of the race. The most common problem was the piston (which occurred in two different cars). The top prize was $1,100 ($12,722 when considering inflation) and the prize for last place was $0. NASCAR's then-current prize structure only gave out monetary rewards from first place to twentieth place; all other finishers did not receive any prize winnings at all. Several models of automobile participated in the race including: Ford (active), Chevrolet (active), Pontiac (defunct), Dodge (active), Mercury (defunct), and Plymouth (defunct).

This was the only race for North Wilkesboro Speedway in the 1956 season. Carl Kiekhaefer was a notable crew chief to attend this race; he was also the owner of the #300C Chrysler vehicle driven by Buck Baker.

Racing numbers in this era were not limited to double-digit numbers. There were a couple of drivers with triple-digit numbers and even a driver using the letter "X" as his race car number. Fortunately, this practice was discarded by NASCAR after the 1963 Sandlapper 200 where Frank Warren would take his single-lettered car to a 13th-place finish (after starting in 18th).

=== Qualifying ===
Grid	No.	Driver	Manufacturer	Owner
1	55	Junior Johnson	'56 Pontiac	A.L. Bumgarner
2	501	Speedy Thompson	'56 Dodge	Carl Kiekhaefer
3	300A	Tim Flock	'56 Chrysler	Carl Kiekhaefer
4	X	Rex White	'56 Chevrolet	Max Welborn
5	12	Ralph Moody	'56 Ford	Pete DePaolo
6	22	Fireball Roberts	'56 Ford	Pete DePaolo
7	92	Herb Thomas	'56 Chevrolet	Herb Thomas
8	75	Jim Paschal	'56 Mercury	Frank Hayworth
9	2	Gwyn Staley	'56 Chevrolet	Hubert Westmoreland
10	98	Allen Adkins	'56 Ford	Tom Harbison
11	100	Ken Milligan	'56 Chevrolet	Dave Everett
12	B29	Dink Widenhouse	'56 Ford	Dink Widenhouse
13	27	John McVitty	'55 Chevrolet	John McVitty
14	5	Bill Blair	'56 Dodge	Joe Blair
15	37	Tiny Lund	'56 Pontiac	Gus Holzmueller
16	82	Joe Eubanks	'56 Ford	James Satcher
17	14	Billy Myers	'56 Mercury	Bill Stroppe
18	42	Lee Petty	'56 Dodge	Petty Enterprises
19	300C	Buck Baker	'56 Chrysler	Carl Kiekhaefer
20	271	Dick Blackwell	'56 Mercury	unknown
21	6	Ralph Liguori	'56 Dodge	Ralph Liguori
22	25	Jimmie Lewallen	'55 Chevrolet	Sam McCuthen
23	94	Ed Cole	'55 Mercury	Ed Cole
24	1	Whitey Norman	'55 Chevrolet	Whitey Norman
25	34	Dick Beaty	'56 Ford	Ike Kiser
26	264	Johnny Allen	'55 Plymouth	Spook Crawford
27	96	Bobby Keck	'55 Chevrolet	Bobby Keck
28	19	Harvey Henderson	'55 Chevrolet	Harvey Henderson
29	54	Lou Spears	'55 Ford	Nace Mattingly

== Finishing order ==
Section reference:

1. Tim Flock† (first victory for Chrysler at this track)
2. Billy Myers† (finished in the lead lap under green flag – highest winning Mercury)
3. Jim Paschal† (finished in the lead lap under green flag)
4. Herb Thomas† (finished in the lead lap under green flag – highest winning Chevrolet)
5. Ralph Moody† (1 lap down – highest winning Ford)
6. Dink Widenhouse (2 laps down)
7. Allen Adkins (2 laps down)
8. Lee Petty† (2 laps down – highest finishing Dodge)
9. Bill Blair (9 laps down)
10. Whitey Norman (10 laps down)
11. Buck Baker† (12 laps down)
12. Dick Beaty (13 laps down)
13. Ed Cole (15 laps down)
14. Tiny Lund (18 laps down – highest finishing Pontiac)
15. Gwyn Staley*† (26 laps down)
16. Ken Milligan (26 laps down)
17. Joe Eubanks*† (27 laps down)
18. Speedy Thompson*† (33 laps down – also led the most laps)
19. Rex White* (48 laps down)
20. John McVitty*† (58 laps down)
21. Dick Blackwell (58 laps down)
22. Jimmie Lewallen*† (67 laps down)
23. Lou Spears* (77 laps down)
24. Ralph Liguori*† (115 laps down)
25. Fireball Roberts*† (122 laps down)
26. Johnny Allen* (138 laps down)
27. Bobby Keck*† (138 laps down)
28. Junior Johnson* (143 laps down)
29. Harvey Henderson* (147 laps down)

* Driver failed to finish race
† Driver is deceased.

== Timeline ==
Section reference:

- Start of race: Junior Johnson started the race with the pole position.
- Lap 13: Engine troubles gave Harvey Henderson a last-place finish.
- Lap 17: A problematic piston ended Junior Johnson's hopes of winning the race.
- Lap 18: Speedy Thompson took over the lead from Junior Johnson.
- Lap 22: Johnny Allen had a terminal crash.
- Lap 38: Driveshaft problems ended Fireball Roberts' race weekend.
- Lap 45: A tire came loose off Ralph Liguri's vehicle.
- Lap 83: Lou Spears' car managed to overheat itself, making him accept the 23rd-place finish.
- Lap 93: Jimmie Lewallen's engine gave up, forcing him to accept a less than stellar finish.
- Lap 102: John McVitty's fuel pump developed problems, causing him to leave the event.
- Lap 112: A frame came loose off Rex White's vehicle.
- Lap 115: Tim Flock took over the lead from Speedy Thompson.
- Lap 127: Speedy Thompson had a faulty gas line in his vehicle, making him leave the race early.
- Lap 133: Joe Eubanks had some troubles with his vehicle's axle, causing him to settle for a 17th-place finish.
- Lap 134: Gwyn Staley's vehicle developed transmission problems, forcing him out of the race.
- Finish: Tim Flock was officially declared the winner of the event.

Preceded by 1955	Wilkes County 160 races 1955	Succeeded by 1957
