= 1955 Southern 500 =

Auto race held at Darlington Raceway in 1955

Coordinates: 34°17′50.5″N 79°54′18.4″W

Race details
- Race 35 of 45 in the 1955 NASCAR Grand National Series season
- 1955 Southern 500 program cover
- Date: September 5, 1955
- Official name: Southern 500
- Location: Darlington Raceway, Darlington, South Carolina
- Course: Permanent racing facility
- Course length: 1.375 miles (2.221 km)
- Distance: 400 laps, 500 mi (800 km)
- Weather: Very hot with temperatures of 82.9 °F (28.3 °C); wind speeds of 11.10 miles per hour (17.86 km/h)
- Average speed: 92.281 mph (148.512 km/h)
- Attendance: 50,000

Pole position
Driver	Fireball Roberts	Bob Fish
- Time: 178.890 seconds

Most laps led
Driver	Joe Weatherly	Charlie Schwam
- Laps: 140

Winner
No. 92	Herb Thomas	Thomas Racing

Television in the United States
- Network: WJMX (local AM radio)
- Announcers: Local radio announcers

The 1955 Southern 500, the sixth running of the event, was a NASCAR Grand National Series event. The event was held on September 5, 1955, at Darlington Raceway in Darlington, South Carolina. This race spanned 500 miles on a paved oval track. An unofficial 30-minute highlight film of this race would appear on the collector's set of Stock Cars of 50s & 60s – Stock Car Memories: Darlington-Southern 500; which was released in 2008.

The local radio station WJMX made it possible to hear the entire race. Confederate flags were frequently flown in all parts of the state back then; they were shown alongside the Stars and Stripes.

== Background ==
Layout of Darlington Raceway, the track where the race was held.

Darlington Raceway, nicknamed by many NASCAR fans and drivers as "The Lady in Black" or "The Track Too Tough to Tame" and advertised as a "NASCAR Tradition", is a race track built for NASCAR racing located near Darlington, South Carolina. It is a unique, somewhat egg-shaped design, an oval with the ends of very different configurations. A condition which supposedly arose from the proximity of one end of the track to a minnow pond the owner refused to move. The track makes it challenging for crews to set up their car's handling in a way that will be effective at both ends.

The track is a four-turn 1.366 miles (2.198 km) oval. The track's first two turns are banked at twenty-five degrees. While the final two turns are banked two degrees lower at twenty-three degrees. The front stretch (the location of the finish line) and the back stretch is banked at six degrees. Darlington Raceway can seat up to 60,000 people.

Darlington has something of a legendary quality among drivers and older fans; this is probably due to its long track length relative to other NASCAR speedways of its era. It's the first venue where many fans realized the truly high speeds that stock cars can achieve on a long track. The track allegedly earned the moniker The Lady in Black because the night before the race the track maintenance crew would cover the entire track with fresh asphalt sealant, in the early years of the speedway, thus making the racing surface dark black. Darlington is also known as "The Track Too Tough to Tame" because drivers can run lap after lap without a problem and then bounce off of the wall the following lap. Racers explain that they have to race the racetrack, not their competition. Drivers who hit the wall gain their "Darlington Stripe", thanks to the car's missing paint.

== Pre-race report ==
=== Historical information ===
The event finished before dusk because artificial lighting was not available. This luxury would not appear until after the 1999 NASCAR Winston Cup Series season. Lights would be first used at the 2000 Mall.com 400 race (which became the Carolina Dodge Dealers 400 from 2001 to 2004 and is currently under the schedule as the Showtime Southern 500). Nearly all the drivers who raced in this event owned their vehicles under their name instead of delegating control to a multi-car team. The Motor Racing Network would not be established until 1970; they would make national coverage of the later NASCAR races starting in the sport's "modern era." Its rival, the Performance Racing Network, would eventually be founded at a later date by Speedway Motorsports.

This was the thirty-fifth race of the 1955 season, there would be only ten races after the conclusion of the 1955 Southern 500. This race was the major race of any NASCAR season that came before the very first running of the Daytona 500.

=== Pre-race festivities ===
Before the race, each part was inspected to verify that it is stock (i.e., can be bought at regular automobile shops as opposed to sneaking in "police parts" or parts intended entirely for racing). Only roll bars were added for extra safety during the 500 miles of racing. Every car that passed the inspection and was "certified stock" was given a certification ticket on the dash. Having a certification permitted the driver to take part in the event with the full blessing of NASCAR. Intermittent periods of rain hampered qualifying and made the track wet. When qualifying finished Fireball Roberts earned the coveted pole position for the race.

On the night preceding the race, a beauty pageant was conducted with Fonty Flock as one of the judges; this tradition would be repeated at the 1956 Southern 500 and all later Southern 500 races. Out of the many contestants that signed up from the Darlington area, Miss Martha Williams (from Myrtle Beach, South Carolina) won the honors of becoming Miss Southern 500 and accepted the ceremonial position that she held during the race.

A marching band was also used as a part of the pre-race festivities. It was unknown whether NASCAR had a pre-race invocation service or not during the 1950s as the highlight film never showed a detailed coverage of the pre-race ceremonies like today's live coverage on television. The singing of The Star-Spangled Banner (which had been the official anthem of the nation since 1931) would be performed but not filmed in the highlight video. NASCAR would become one of the first major league sports where the American national anthem was used since its start. Even back in those days, it was customary to hear "Gentlemen start your engines" to fire up the racers into a rolling start. Qualifying would take up the whole month as it does at today's Indianapolis 500 races; regulations made in the "modern era" of the sport (1972–2003) modified the rules so that qualifying is limited to one day.

=== Qualifying results ===
Note: Some drivers qualified with a four-lap run (only the first and second qualifying session) and the majority qualified with a two-lap run (the next three qualifying sessions)

Grid	No.	Driver	Manufacturer	Qualifying time	Speed	Owner
1	M-1	Fireball Roberts	'55 Buick	2:58.890	110.682	Bob Fish
2	89	Buck Baker	'55 Buick	3:00.840	109.489	Buck Baker
3	87	Speedy Thompson	'54 Oldsmobile	3:02.020	108.779	Bob Griffin
4	25	Bill Widenhouse	'55 Chevrolet	3:02.450	108.522	Sam McCutchen
5	82	Joe Eubanks	'55 Oldsmobile	3:04.360	107.398	Phil Oates
6	16	Tim Flock	'55 Chrysler	2:56.720	112.041	Carl Kiekhaefer
7	9	Joe Weatherly	'55 Ford	3:01.640	109.006	Charlie Schwam
8	92	Herb Thomas	'55 Chevrolet	3:01.720	108.958	Herb Thomas
9	8	Billy Carden	'55 Buick	3:05.620	106.727	Bishop Brothers
10	78	Jimmy Paschal	'55 Oldsmobile	3:06.060	106.417	Ernest Woods

Failed to qualify: Maurice Thompson (#39), Harvey Eakin (#47), Homer Newland (#48), Leland Sewell (#51), Jack Smith (#1), Ted Wright (#01)

== Race report ==
Fireball Roberts earned the pole position at a speed of 110.682 miles per hour or 178.125 kilometres per hour. The average speed of the race (with full racing traffic), however, was 92.281 miles per hour or 148.512 kilometres per hour. Out of the 336 laps, there were eight yellow flag periods consisting of fifty-one laps. Fifty thousand people attended the live event to see sixty-nine cars race (less than half of them finished the race). The two laps led by Bill Widenhouse were the only two for his Grand National career. Joe Weatherly, making only his third career start, put on quite a show leading most laps in the race but ultimately crashed out on lap 317. Russ Graham also spun twice in this race, once avoiding Fireball Roberts's M-1 (who had blown a tire and crashed) and then once a couple of laps later on his own. Graham would eventually finish in 29th place after qualifying 19th.

Regulations made decades after this race would finally standardize the field to forty-three racing vehicles; a far cry from the fairly unregulated form of NASCAR that dominated the 1950s and 1960s.

Vehicles ranged in production year from the 1953 models that were driven by the less affluent teams to the 1955 models driven by wealthy teams like Petty Enterprises. Other notable NASCAR Grand National Series drivers that participated in this event were Junior Johnson, Ned Jarrett, and Lee Petty. All of the drivers competing in this race were American. This race would serve as the "swan song" for Cadillac in the Cup Series.

The infamous crash between Arden Mounts and Don Duckworth is captured within this still image.

Arden Mounts' appearance at this race, where he would crash into Don Duckworth's stalled vehicle, would be captured on highlight films. While Bill Champion managed to avoid Duckworth by swerving past, Mounts managed saw the stalled vehicle too late and crashed into him. The proper use of seat belts saved the lives of both Mounts and Duckworth.

Herb Thomas would end up winning the race after five hours, twenty-five minutes, and twenty-five seconds of racing; beating Jim Reed by more than one lap. He would receive $7,480 ($89,899 when adjusted for inflation) while the total winnings for the race were $28,270 ($339,767 in when adjusted for inflation). Thomas drove a pale green 1955 Chevrolet 150 during a time where NASCAR was used to test the endurance of the newest passenger automobiles. However, the eventual championship winner would be Tim Flock with 18 season wins and winnings of $37,780 ($454,064 when adjusted for inflation).

An SBC Chevy V8 engine was used in Herb Thomas's race-winning vehicle; the Chevrolets during the 1955 season were lighter than their competitors, giving them better gas mileage and fewer pit stops needed to finish the race. Tire changes were also relatively infrequent on the Chevrolet vehicles during the race; which was another reason why Chevrolets dominated. The final fate of the original winning car that Herb Thomas used isn't known but it was likely raced into the ground over the course of subsequent races and no longer exists.

Van Van Wey spun four times during the race; eventually resulting in him inflicting terminal damage to his vehicle on lap 247. Vehicle manufacturers involved in the race were Studebaker, Plymouth, Chevrolet, Buick, Dodge, Ford, Hudson, Cadillac, Pontiac, and Nash Motors.

More than half of the vehicles used were manufactured by Chevrolet while Nash Motors only had one vehicle in the running along with Studebaker. Sponsors for the drivers in the race included Mercury Outboards, Marion Cox Garage, Schwam Motors, Helzafire (owned by Kentucky Colonel Ernest Woods), The Racing Club, Paper Hangers, and Fish Carburetor.

Lloyd Moore would announce his retirement from NASCAR after this race. Smokey Yunick, Carl Kiekhaefer, and Red Vogt were the three most notable crew chiefs to take part in this event.

Dick Beaty would make his NASCAR Grand National Series debut in this race.

=== Timeline ===
Section reference:

- Start of race: Fireball Roberts started with the official pole position.
- Lap 5: Tim Flock took over the lead from Fireball Roberts.
- Lap 11: Fonty Flock took over the lead from Tim Flock.
- Lap 12: Issues with the vehicle's rod bearing ended Ed Cole's hopes of winning the event.
- Lap 18: Pop McGinnis had a terminal crash.
- Lap 30: Fireball Roberts had a terminal crash.
- Lap 39: Problems with the vehicle's rod bearing forced Gordon Smith to abandon the race.
- Lap 41: Fuel pump problems forced Tommy Thompson out of the race.
- Lap 44: Bud Rackley had a problem with his vehicle connection rod.
- Lap 50: Transmission issues forced Dick Rathmann to leave the event early.
- Lap 77: Slick Smith blew a gasket in his vehicle; forcing him to leave the race early.
- Lap 78: Steering issues forced Donald Thomas out of the race.
- Lap 79: Elmo Langley had oil pressure issues with his vehicle that ended his chances of winning the race.
- Lap 95: Tim Flock took over the lead from Fonty Flock.
- Lap 110: Curtis Turner took over the lead from Tim Flock.
- Lap 124: Tim Flock took over the lead from Curtis Turner.
- Lap 133: Issues with the vehicle's tie rod caused Curtis Turner to accept a 58th-place finish.
- Lap 137: Jimmy Roland's rear end came off his vehicle; ending his race weekend prematurely.
- Lap 147: Don Duckworth crashed into Arden Mounts (who was four laps behind him).
- Lap 148: Bill Widenhouse took over the look from Tim Flock.
- Lap 150: Joe Weatherly took over the lead from Bill Widenhouse.
- Lap 184: Dick Beaty and Jim Thompson both had terminal crashes forcing them out of the race.
- Lap 188: Transmission issues forced Gene Simpson to exit the race.
- Lap 190: Fonty Flock had a terminal crash.
- Lap 202: Dick Allwine had a terminal crash.
- Lap 210: The rear end of Clarence DeZalia's vehicle came off; forcing him to leave the event.
- Lap 225: A faulty transmission forced Doug Cox out of the race.
- Lap 231: Fred Johnson developed problems with his tires.
- Lap 235: Vapor lock issues forced Speedy Thompson off the track.
- Lap 247: Van Van Wey had a terminal crash.
- Lap 279: Herb Thomas took over the lead from Joe Weatherly.
- Lap 307: Joe Weatherly took over the lead from Herb Thomas.
- Lap 317: Joe Weatherly had a terminal crash.
- Lap 319: Herb Thomas took over the lead from Joe Weatherly.
- Lap 352: Problems with Jimmy Massey's transmission forced him out of the race.
- Lap 353: One of Bill Widenhouse's wheels became problematic; making him the final DNF of the race.
- Finish: Herb Thomas was officially declared the winner of the event.

=== Finishing order ===
Section reference:

1. Herb Thomas
2. Jim Reed
3. Tim Flock
4. Gwyn Staley
5. Larry Flynn
6. Buck Baker
7. Lou Spears
8. Cotton Owens
9. Bill Widenhouse*
10. Jimmy Massey*
11. Banks Simpson
12. Joe Eubanks
13. Marvin Panch
14. Nace Mattingly
15. Jimmie Lewallen
16. Ralph Liguori
17. Banjo Matthews
18. Dave Terrell
19. Russ Graham
20. Bill Champion
21. Lee Petty
22. Johnny Patterson
23. Billy Myers
24. Lloyd Moore
25. Ray Platte
26. Bill Blair
27. Bobby Waddell
28. Blackie Pitt
29. Jimmy Thompson
30. Bob Welborn
31. Curley Hatfield
32. Roy Bentley
33. Joe Weatherly*
34. Jim Paschal
35. Bill Bowman
36. Junior Johnson
37. Ned Jarrett
38. Ed Bergin
39. Billy Carden
40. Tojo Stephens
41. Possum Jones
42. Eddie Skinner
43. Harold Kite
44. Van Van Wey*
45. Speedy Thompson*
46. Fred Johnson*
47. Doug Cox*
48. Gene Comstock
49. Clarence DeZalia*
50. Dick Allwine*
51. Fonty Flock*
52. Gene Simpson*
53. Dick Beaty*
54. Jim Thompson*
55. Don Duckworth*
56. Arden Mounts*
57. Jimmy Roland*
58. Curtis Turner
59. Elmo Langley*
60. Donald Thomas*
61. Slick Smith*
62. Dick Rathmann*
63. Bud Rackley*
64. Tommy Thompson*
65. Gordon Smith*
66. Fireball Roberts*
67. Pop McGinnis*
68. Ed Cole*
69. George Parrish*

* Driver failed to finish race

Preceded by 1954	Southern 500 races 1955	Succeeded by 1956
