= 1956 Southern 500 =

Auto race held at Darlington Raceway in 1956

Coordinates: 34°17′50.5″N 79°54′18.4″W

Race details
- Race 44 of 56 in the 1956 NASCAR Grand National Series season
- 1956 Southern 500 program cover
- Date: September 3, 1956
- Location: Darlington Raceway, Darlington, South Carolina
- Course: Permanent racing facility
- Course length: 1.375 miles (2.221 km)
- Distance: 400 laps, 500 mi (800 km)
- Weather: Very hot with temperatures of 89.1 °F (31.7 °C); wind speed of 13 miles per hour (21 km/h)
- Average speed: 95.167 mph (153.156 km/h)
- Attendance: 70,000

Pole position
Driver	Speedy Thompson	Carl Kiekhaefer

Most laps led
Driver	Curtis Turner	Charlie Schwam
- Laps: 225

Winner
No. 99	Curtis Turner	Charlie Schwam

Television in the United States
- Network: WJMX (local AM radio)
- Announcers: Local radio announcers

The 1956 Southern 500, the seventh running of the event, was a NASCAR Grand National Series event that was held on September 3, 1956, at Darlington Raceway in Darlington, South Carolina.

This race was considered to be the "Labor Day Classic" for 1956; complete with a pre-race beauty pageant with a judging panel led by Fonty Flock for the title of Ms. Southern 500 (won by 19 year old Robin Williamson of South Carolina) and a parade down the front stretch of the race track.

== Background ==
Layout of Darlington Raceway, the track where the race was held.

Darlington Raceway, nicknamed by many NASCAR fans and drivers as "The Lady in Black" or "The Track Too Tough to Tame" and advertised as a "NASCAR Tradition", is a race track built for NASCAR racing located near Darlington, South Carolina. It is of a unique, somewhat egg-shaped design, an oval with the ends of very different configurations, a condition which supposedly arose from the proximity of one end of the track to a minnow pond the owner refused to relocate. This situation makes it very challenging for the crews to set up their cars' handling in a way that will be effective at both ends.

The track is a four-turn 1.366 miles (2.198 km) oval. The track's first two turns are banked at twenty-five degrees, while the final two turns are banked two degrees lower at twenty-three degrees. The front stretch (the location of the finish line) and the back stretch is banked at six degrees. Darlington Raceway can seat up to 60,000 people.

Darlington has something of a legendary quality among drivers and older fans; this is probably due to its long track length relative to other NASCAR speedways of its era and hence the first venue where many of them became cognizant of the truly high speeds that stock cars could achieve on a long track. The track allegedly earned the moniker The Lady in Black because the night before the race the track maintenance crew would cover the entire track with fresh asphalt sealant, in the early years of the speedway, thus making the racing surface dark black. Darlington is also known as "The Track Too Tough to Tame" because drivers can run lap after lap without a problem and then bounce off of the wall the following lap. Racers will frequently explain that they have to race the racetrack, not their competition. Drivers hitting the wall are considered to have received their "Darlington Stripe" thanks to the missing paint on the right side of the car.

== Race report ==
There were 364 laps done on a paved track spanning 1.375 miles (2.213 km). It only took five hours, fifteen minutes, and thirty-three seconds for the race to reach its conclusion. Seven cautions were committed for seventy-eight laps and the margin of victory was more than two laps. Attendance was established at seventy thousand people; about the size of a typical modern day sporting event.

The NASCAR races of the 1950s were definitely different in how they raced, qualified, had race entertainment, and how drivers built and set up each car. Speeds of up to 120 miles per hour (190 km/h) were consistently witnessed throughout the race in addition to the qualifying sessions. Drivers who were amazed at the speeds they went during these times would be absolutely surprised at the modern NASCAR vehicles going upwards of 184 miles per hour (296 km/h) in the most recent races at Darlington Raceway. However, the use of technology and complicated strategies has caused driver skill to become of secondary importance in NASCAR races. The skill, determination and grit that dominated the NASCAR Cup Series from its debut in 1949 to the late-1990s has been replaced by calculated strategies made primarily by the crew chiefs in the 21st century.

The average speed of the race was 95.167 miles per hour (153.156 km/h) while the pole speed was 119.695 miles per hour (192.630 km/h) and was achieved by Speedy Thompson. Seventy American drivers competed as the race entries; there were no foreigners in that race. Other notable drivers in the race included future car owner Junior Johnson, Joe Weatherly, Fonty Flock, Gwyn Staley, Fireball Roberts, Tiny Lund and Herb Thomas. Judge Rider would make his only Cup Series start in this event. Gene Bergin would participate in his first NASCAR Grand National race here and finished in 36th place. Fireball Roberts crashed into another car on lap 166 because he failed to slow down for a caution flag. The cars of #54 Bill Brown and #72 of Peck Peckham were the only cars in the race not manufactured in 1956.

Bobby Myers fell out then drove in relief for Jim Paschal finishing in sixth place. Paschal, however, got credit for the finish according to NASCAR's archives of race finishes. Larry Flynn made contact with Bill Brown during this race around lap 235. Brown, sporting a very rare onboard (on the front bumper), flew over the wall, destroying the guardrail there, and rolled down the bank, and Flynn's gas container flew out. It was hit by someone and a fire started, which spread to the car. Luckily, seatbelts helped to save the lives of both Flynn and Brown.

Total winnings for the race was $35,365 ($418,796 when adjusted for inflation). Manufacturers involved in the event included Chevrolet (active), Ford (active), Dodge (active), Mercury (defunct after 2010), Plymouth (defunct), Chrysler (active), Pontiac (defunct), and Buick (active).

Only one Pontiac and one Chrysler were too slow to compete in this event. The rest of the non-qualifying vehicles were Chevrolet, Ford, Dodge, and Plymouth. Jesse James Taylor made his first Cup start since his brutal rollover at Lakewood back in November 1951 that left him with some serious head injuries. He never quite reached back to the heights he did before; any chances of making a comeback ended quickly here with an engine failure in the early laps. After Lee Petty withdrew his No. 42 he replaced Glen Wood in the No. 35.

This race had a loaded field that had 30 drivers who had a significant level of expertise in the NASCAR Cup Series during the 1950s and had previously won a NASCAR Grand National Series at a time where racing skill was paramount.

This was the last race for Dink Widenhouse due to an accident he was involved in a wreck on lap 158 where he managed to cut his arm. As he climbed out of his car, Widenhouse noticed he was bleeding and passed out. The track officials saw him unconscious, tangled in his safety belt, and upside down, head in the helmet, with the helmet resting on the racing surface. He wasn't really hurt that badly and didn't have to be sent to a nearby hospital.

Carl Kiekhaefer was the only notable crew chief to attend this race; he was also the owner of the #87 Chrysler vehicle driven by Buck Baker.

Until the AC Spark Plug 500 in 1988, this marked the last time that Goodyear tires were not present.

=== Qualifying ===
Grid	No.	Driver	Manufacturer
1	57	Speedy Thompson	'56 Chrysler
2	8	Marvin Panch	'56 Ford
3	97	Bill Amick	'56 Ford
4	3	Paul Goldsmith	'56 Chevrolet
5	92	Herb Thomas	'56 Chevrolet
6	87	Buck Baker	'56 Chrysler
7	27	Frank Mundy	'56 Dodge
8	12	Ralph Moody	'56 Ford
9	82	Joe Eubanks	'56 Ford
10	52	Bill Widenhouse	'56 Ford
11	99	Curtis Turner	'56 Ford
12	15	Fonty Flock	'56 Mercury
13	22	Fireball Roberts	'56 Ford
14	14	Billy Myers	'56 Mercury
15	86	Tim Flock	'56 Ford

Failed to qualify: William Pike (#74), Joe Blair (#5), Matt Gowan (#64), Bobby Boyd, Rat Garner (#17), Bryce Beck, Pete Yow (#03), Jud Larson (#69), Everett Brashear (#39)
Withdrew from race: Johnny Fite (#20)

=== Finishing order ===
Section reference:

1. Curtis Turner†
2. Speedy Thompson†
3. Marvin Panch†
4. Jim Reed†
5. Paul Goldsmith†
6. Jim Paschal†
7. Bill Amick†
8. Joe Weatherly†
9. Bobby Johns†
10. Pat Kirkwood†
11. Rex White
12. Tim Flock†
13. Roz Howard†
14. Johnny Patterson†
15. Junior Johnson†
16. Billy Myers†
17. Lee Petty†
18. Harold Hardesty
19. Elmo Langley†
20. Shorty York†
21. Bill Champion†
22. Possum Jones†
23. Emanuel Zervakis†
24. Tiny Lund†
25. Johnny Allen†
26. Buck Baker†
27. Jack Smith†
28. Billy Carden†
29. Bill Blair†
30. Sherman Utsman†
31. Lou Spears
32. Brownie King
33. Joe Eubanks*†
34. Allen Adkins†
35. Tom Lupo†
36. Gene Bergin†
37. Ralph Liguori*†
38. Frank Mundy*†
39. Harvey Henderson†
40. Dick Beaty*†
41. Judge Rider
42. Wade Fields
43. Bill Brown*
44. Larry Flynn*†
45. Johnny Dodson*†
46. Blackie Pitt*†
47. Pat Grogan*†
48. Clyde Palmer*†
49. Herb Thomas*†
50. Parnelli Jones*†
51. Fireball Roberts*†
52. Ray Hendrick*†
53. Bill Widenhouse*†
54. Dink Widenhouse*†
55. Roy Bentley*
56. Ken Love†
57. Ralph Moody*†
58. Fonty Flock*†
59. Danny Letner*†
60. Don Oldenberg*†
61. Bobby Myers*†
62. Bob Duell*†
63. Nace Mattingly*†
64. Pee Wee Jones*†
65. Gwyn Staley*†
66. Doug Yates*†
67. Peck Peckham*†
68. Russ Graham*
69. Jesse James Taylor*†
70. Arden Mounts*†

† signifies that the driver is known to be deceased
* Driver failed to finish race

== Timeline ==
Section reference:

- Start of race: Marvin Panch officially began the event with the pole position.
- Lap 2: Speedy Thompson took over the lead from Marvin Panch.
- Lap 12: Piston troubles made Arden Mounts into the last-place finisher.
- Lap 17: Tim Flock took over the lead from Speedy Thompson.
- Lap 25: Jesse James Taylor's engine problems would force him to leave the race early.
- Lap 26: Russ Graham had a terminal crash, forcing him to exit the race.
- Lap 27: Gasket problems would force Peck Peckham to exit the race.
- Lap 33: Marvin Panch took over the lead from Tim Flock.
- Lap 34: Curtis Turner took over the lead from Marvin Panch.
- Lap 36: Tim Flock took over the lead from Curtis Turner.
- Lap 39: Curtis Turner took over the lead from Tim Flock.
- Lap 54: Doug Yates had a terminal crash, forcing him to exit the race prematurely.
- Lap 57: Gwyn Staley had a terminal crash, ending his race weekend.
- Lap 60: Throttle problems forced Pee Wee Jones to stop racing for the remainder of the race.
- Lap 73: Engine problems managed to take Nace Mattingly out of the race.
- Lap 90: Bob Duell lost the rear end of his racing vehicle.
- Lap 91: Bobby Myers' gas tank was yanked off in a manner unsafe for racing.
- Lap 96: Marvin Panch took over the lead from Curtis Turner.
- Lap 100: Don Oldenburg's gas tank was yanked off in a manner unsafe for racing.
- Lap 101: Jim Paschal took over the lead from Marvin Panch.
- Lap 113: Danny Letner had a terminal crash.
- Lap 117: Spindle problems managed to sideline Fonty Flock for the remainder of the race.
- Lap 119: Ralph Moody had a terminal crash.
- Lap 132: Fireball Roberts took over the lead from Jim Paschal.
- Lap 146: Roy Bentley had a terminal crash, forcing him to exit the race.
- Lap 158: Dink Widenhouse had a terminal crash, forcing him to exit the race.
- Lap 159: Bill Widenhouse fell out with engine failure.
- Lap 163: Ray Hendrick fell out with engine failure.
- Lap 166: Fireball Roberts had a terminal crash, forcing him to exit the race.
- Lap 167: Curtis Turner took over the lead from Fireball Roberts.
- Lap 169: Marvin Panch took over the lead from Curtis Turner; Parnelli Jones had a terminal crash.
- Lap 173: Herb Thomas had a terminal crash, forcing him to exit the race.
- Lap 177: Clyde Palmer managed to overheat his vehicle.
- Lap 202: Curtis Turner took over the lead from Marvin Panch.
- Lap 204: One of Johnny Dotson's wheels came loose while he was racing.
- Lap 222: Larry Flynn had a terminal crash, forcing him to exit the race.
- Lap 235: Bill Brown had a terminal crash, forcing him to exit the race.
- Lap 264: Dick Beaty had a terminal crash, forcing him to exit the race.
- Lap 276: Frank Mundy fell out with engine failure.
- Lap 300: The axle on Ralph Liguori's vehicle became problematic.
- Lap 317: Joe Eubanks' vehicle managed to blow a gasket.
- Finish: Curtis Turner was officially declared the winner of the event.

Preceded by 1955	Southern 500 races 1957	Succeeded by 1957
