= 1955 LeHi 300 =

Auto race held at Memphis-Arkansas Speedway in 1955

Coordinates: 35°8.31486′N 90°18.9617′W

Race details
- Race 40 of 45 in the 1955 NASCAR Grand National Series season
- Date: October 9, 1955
- Official name: LeHi 300
- Location: Memphis-Arkansas Speedway (LeHi, Arkansas)
- Course: Permanent racing facility
- Course length: 1.500 miles (3.000 km)
- Distance: 200 laps, 300.1 mi (452.8 km)
- Weather: Mild with temperatures of 77 °F (25 °C); wind speeds of 10.1 miles per hour (16.3 km/h)
- Average speed: 83.948 mph (135.101 km/h)
- Attendance: 8,500

Pole position
Driver	Fonty Flock	Carl Keikhaefer

Most laps led
Driver	Speedy Thompson	Pete DePaolo
- Laps: 158

Winner
No. 297	Speedy Thompson	Pete DePaolo

The 1955 LeHi 300 (known officially in NASCAR as 1955-40) was a NASCAR Grand National Series event that was held on October 9, 1955, at Memphis-Arkansas Speedway in Lehi, Arkansas.

Drivers had to commute to the races, under their own power, using the same stock cars that competed in a typical weekend's race. This was due to a policy of homologation which ended around 1975. By 1980, NASCAR had stopped tracking the year model of the vehicles and most teams no longer took cars to the track under their own power.

== Race report ==
The 200-lap race took three hours and thirty-four minutes to complete in front of 8500 live spectators. Speedy Thompson defeated Marvin Panch by ¾ of a single lap. Ford won its first race as a manufacturer since 1950. Fonty Flock earned the pole position with a speed of 100.390 miles per hour (161.562 km/h), while the winner of the race achieved a speed of 83.948 miles per hour (135.101 km/h). Jim Reed was disqualified for using non-stock cylinder heads, which NASCAR considered a repeat violation. The in-race disqualification resulted in Reed given the last-place finish on lap 8. All of the 41 drivers on the racing grid were Caucasian American-born males. This was the 40th racing event out of 45 in the 1955 NASCAR Grand National Series season.

Bob Flock made his only NASCAR Grand National Series start under car owner Carl Kiekhafer. Due to strained relationships between Flock and Kiekhafer, Flock would never drive for him again. In this race, 21 of the drivers had previously won in the NASCAR Grand National Cup Series. This was also the 12th of Buck Baker's 16 consecutive finishes to bring the 1955 NASCAR Grand National Series to a conclusion. It was also the 10th of 12 starts for Johnny Mantz.

The total amount of prize winnings that could have been earned from this racing event was $9,120 ($107,049.54 when adjusted for inflation). Smokey Yunick and Carl Kiekhaefer were the two notable crew chiefs that participated in the event.

Tiny Lund made his career start during this event and received $60 ($704.27 when adjusted for inflation). Other drivers making their NASCAR Cup Series debut in this race included Johnny Allen, Bill Morton, Jim Murray, Norm Nelson, and Chuck Stevenson. Many drivers would make their grand exits from NASCAR after this race, including included Floyd Curtis, Hooker Hood, Roscoe Rann and Leland Sewell. One-time drivers Bob Coleman, Al Hager, and Gene Rose would make their only NASCAR appearances during the race.

Even during the 1950s, it was unusual to see four cars fail to finish the race. This happened due to vapor lock, which disrupts the operation of the fuel pump and causes loss of feed pressure to the carburetor.

=== Qualifying ===
Grid	No.	Driver	Manufacturer	Owner
1	301	Fonty Flock	'55 Chrysler	Carl Kiekhaefer
2	300	Tim Flock	'55 Chrysler	Carl Kiekhaefer
3	87	Buck Baker	'55 Ford	Pete DePaolo
4	99	Billy Carden	'55 Ford	Charlie Schwam
5	95	Curtis Turner	'55 Ford	Charlie Schwam
6	98	Marvin Panch	'55 Ford	Pete DePaolo
7	92	Herb Thomas	'55 Chevrolet	Herb Thomas
8	86	Joe Weatherly	'55 Ford	Pete DePaolo
8	308	Bob Flock	'55 Chrysler	Carl Kiekhaefer
10	297	Speedy Thompson	'55 Ford	Pete DePaolo
11	25	Bill Widenhouse	'55 Chevrolet	Sam McCuthen
12	04	Jimmy Massey	'55 Chevrolet	Hubert Westmoreland
13	2	Gwyn Staley	'55 Chevrolet	Hubert Westmoreland
14	B-29	Dink Widenhouse	'55 Ford	Dink Widenhouse
15	68	Chuck Stevenson	'55 Ford	Pete DePaolo
16	17	Russ Graham	'55 Chevrolet	Earl Wright
17	70	Joe Eubanks	'55 Chevrolet	Lancaster Brothers
18	88	Jimmie Lewallen	'55 Oldsmobile	Ernest Woods
19	198	Dave Terrell	'55 Oldsmobile	Dave Terrell
20	49	Bob Welborn	'55 Chevrolet	Bob Welborn
21	15	Johnny Mantz	'55 Ford	unknown
22	188	Hooker Hood	'54 Oldsmobile	Hooker Hood
23	37	Tiny Lund	'55 Chevrolet	Carl Rupert
24	42	Lee Petty	'55 Dodge	Petty Enterprises
25	44	Ralph Liguori	'55 Chevrolet	Julian Petty

=== Top 10 finishers ===
Pos	Grid	No.	Driver	Manufacturer	Laps	Winnings	Laps led	Time/Status
1	10	297	Speedy Thompson	'55 Ford	200	$2,900	158	3:34:25
2	6	98	Marvin Panch	'55 Ford	200	$1,450	0	+0.75 laps
3	12	04	Jimmy Massey	'55 Chevrolet	196	$1,000	0	+4 laps
4	2	300	Tim Flock	'55 Chrysler	195	$850	42	+5 laps
5	8	308	Bob Flock	'55 Chrysler	195	$650	0	+5 laps
6	3	87	Buck Baker	'55 Ford	194	$525	0	+6 laps
7	18	18	Jimmie Lewallen	'55 Oldsmobile	190	$400	0	+10 laps
8	25	44	Ralph Liguori	'55 Chevrolet	189	$350	0	+11 laps
9	14	B-29	Dink Widenhouse	'55 Ford	185	$250	0	+15 laps
10	20	49	Bob Welborn	'55 Chevrolet	183	$225	0	+17 laps

== Timeline ==
Section reference:

- Start of race: Tim Flock started the race with the pole position.
- Lap 3: A piston located inside Ted Cannady's vehicle stopped working properly.
- Lap 5: Radiator issues forced Fonty Flock into the sidelines for the remainder of the race.
- Lap 8: Jim Reed was disqualified from the race.
- Lap 10: The radiator on Floyd Curtis' vehicle no longer worked properly.
- Lap 13: The gasket on Eddie Skinner's vehicle fell off.
- Lap 19: The vapor lock on Curtis Turner's vehicle acted in an unusual manner.
- Lap 22: Russ Graham's vehicle overheated; Bill Widenhouse's radiator started acting strangely.
- Lap 27: Dave Terrell had a terminal crash.
- Lap 29: Joe Weatherly's vehicle developed vapor lock issues.
- Lap 38: Gwyn Staley's fuel pump started acting funny, forcing him off the track.
- Lap 43: Speedy Thompson takes over the lead from Tim Flock.
- Lap 46: Johnny Mantz suddenly had problems with his vapor lock along with Joe Eubanks.
- Lap 55: Billy Carden had a terminal crash.
- Lap 63: Jim Murray's fuel pump was giving him problems.
- Lap 65: Tiny Lund had a terminal crash.
- Lap 123: Bill Morton had a terminal crash.
- Lap 132: The rear end of Herb Thomas' vehicle fell off, forcing him to leave the event.
- Lap 162: Norm Nelson's engine became problematic, causing him to exit the race early.
- Finish: Speedy Thompson was declared the winner of the race.
