= 1955 Wilkes County 160 =

Auto race held at North Wilkesboro Speedway in 1955

Race details
- Race 8 of 45 in the 1955 NASCAR Grand National Series season
- North Wilkesboro Speedway
- Date: April 3, 1955
- Official name: Wilkes County 160
- Location: North Wilkesboro Speedway, North Wilkesboro, North Carolina
- Course: Permanent racing facility
- Course length: 1.00 km (0.625 miles)
- Distance: 160 laps, 100 mi (160 km)
- Weather: Mild with temperatures of 75 °F (24 °C); wind speeds of 18.1 miles per hour (29.1 km/h)
- Average speed: 73.126 miles per hour (117.685 km/h)
- Attendance: 10,000

Pole position
Driver	Dink Widenhouse	Dink Widenhouse

Most laps led
Driver	Buck Baker	Bob Griffin
- Laps: 160

Winner
No. 87	Buck Baker	Bob Griffin

Television in the United States
- Network: untelevised
- Announcers: none

The 1955 Wilkes County 160 was a NASCAR Grand National Series event that was held on April 3, 1955, at North Wilkesboro Speedway in North Wilkesboro, North Carolina.

== Background ==
North Wilkesboro carried a reputation as one of the fastest short-tracks in auto racing in the late 1940s and 1950s. In 1950, speeds reached 73 mph at the track, compared to the next fastest short-track, Charlotte Speedway, where top speeds only reached 66 mph. Most of the fans in the early years of the sport saw the track as notorious for being a great venue to watch races between the legendary racers of the time. Racing at North Wilkesboro was intense and physical.

The 1950 Wilkes 200 was the second Grand National Series race held at North Wilkesboro Speedway. Twenty-six cars entered the race. Twenty-one-year-old Fireball Roberts qualified with a lap speed of 73.266 mph on the dirt track for his first ever Grand National pole, but engine problems dropped him out of the running. Fonty Flock started in the third position and led the most laps in the race with 104, but engine troubles also ended his day. Ultimately, Leon Sales led eight of the 200 laps to become the victor, the fourth NASCAR driver to win an event in his debut race. Jack Smith finished second after leading 55 laps in the race.

After hosting only one NASCAR event in 1949 and one in 1950, the track began running two Grand National Series events per year in 1951 (with the exception of 1956, when only one race was held; the track was being prepared for pavement). One race was held in the spring, normally in late March or early April, and another was held in the fall, normally in late September or early October. In 1957, owner Enoch Stanley had the 5/8-mile track paved.

The Wilkes 200 in 1952 turned into a battle between brothers. Two sets of brothers competed in the race, and they took the top four spots at the finish. The Flock Brothers (Fonty Flock and Tim Flock) were strong, but the Thomas brothers (Herb Thomas and Donald Thomas) had the better outcome. Herb Thomas, driving his 1952 "Fabulous" Hudson Hornet, won the pole, led 192 of the 200 laps, and grabbed the victory. Fonty Flock led the first eight laps and finished the race second. Donald Thomas, also in a 1952 "Fabulous" Hudson Hornet, finished third, and Tim Flock finished fourth. Eleven of the 27 cars entered in the race finished. Six of the top nine positions were driving Hudson Hornets.

Herb Thomas started on the pole for the 1953 Wilkes 200 with his record-setting qualifying speed of 78.424 mph on the dirt surface. Outside pole sitter Tim Flock led the first 100 laps before experiencing engine problems. Curtis Turner took the lead on Lap 101 and continued the lead until his car also succumbed to engine troubles nine laps later. Thomas in his Number 92 Hudson Hornet only lead 18 laps in the race but ended the race by taking his third consecutive win at North Wilkesboro. Starting from the third spot, Dick Rathmann led 70 laps and finished behind Herb Thomas. Fonty Flock managed to work his way up from the fourth starting position to the front and led three laps before dropping back and finishing third.

Pole sitter Buck Baker ran 78.288 mph to gap the pole for the 1953 Wilkes 160. Baker ran strong and led the most laps in the race with 80 out front before falling back into sixth position at the finish. Speedy Thompson led 25 laps, and Fonty Flock led 37. Curtis Turner led a total of 18 laps. At the end of the race, Thompson finished two laps ahead of second-place Flock. Thompson's win ended Herb Thomas and his Hudson Hornet's three-race winning streak at North Wilkesboro.

At the 1954 Wilkes County 160, Gober Sosebee won the pole with a lap speed of 78.698 mph. Sosebee led a race-high 112 laps but finished in 12th position, eight laps down. The only other leader was Dick Rathmann, who led 48 laps. Rathmann blew a tire while leading, with three laps to go, and still managed to finish and win the race. Herb Thomas finished some 20 seconds behind in second place.

In the 1954 Wilkes 160, Hershel McGriff won the pole with a qualifying speed of 77.612 mph. He and Dick Rathman were the only leaders of the race; McGriff led 74 laps, and Rathman led 83. The race was called three laps early because of a serious crash involving Lou Figaro; his car flipped, and the roof caved in. Figaro was transported to a hospital in Winston-Salem, but he died the following day from a skull fracture and brain damage suffered in the crash. McGriff was declared the winner. It was his final victory and his last Grand National race for 17 years.

== Race report ==
One hundred and sixty laps were done on a dirt track spanning .625 miles (1.006 km). The total duration of the race was one hour, twenty-two minutes, and three seconds with no cautions. Buck Baker defeated Dick Rathmann by three feet; the final ten laps was a neck-to-neck battle between Baker and Rathmann. Ten thousand people came out to see this race.

The pole speed that was accomplished by Dink Widenhouse was 77.720 miles per hour (125.078 km/h) while the average speed was 73.126 miles per hour (117.685 km/h). Other notable drivers who participated included Lee Petty, Herb Thomas, Dink Widenhouse, Fonty Flock, and Junior Johnson. All twenty-two drivers who qualified were American-born. Twelve drivers failed to finish the race due to axle, spindle, coil, wheel, frame, vapor lock, tire, gasket, and bearing problems.

The total winnings of the race was $3,800 USD ($44,604 when considering inflation). Race car drivers still had to commute to the races using the same stock cars that competed in a typical weekend's race through a policy of homologation (and under their own power). This policy was in effect until roughly 1975. By 1980, NASCAR had completely stopped tracking the year model of all the vehicles and most teams did not take stock cars to the track under their own power anymore.

Carl Kiekhaefer was the only notable crew chief to appear at this race; he was also the owner of the #300 Chrysler vehicle driven by Tim Flock.

=== Qualifying ===
Grid	No.	Driver	Manufacturer	Owner
1	B-29	Dink Widenhouse	'53 Oldsmobile	Dink Widenhouse
2	87	Buck Baker	'54 Oldsmobile	Bob Griffin
4	55	Junior Johnson	'55 Oldsmobile	Jim Lowe / Carl Beckham
5	14	Fonty Flock	'55 Chevrolet	Frank Christian
6	78	Jim Paschal	'55 Oldsmobile	Ernest Woods
7	99	Curtis Turner	'55 Oldsmobile	Raymond Parks
8	3	Dick Rathman	'54 Hudson	John Ditz
9	88	Joel Million	'55 Oldsmobile	Ernest Woods
10	42	Lee Petty	'55 Chrysler	Petty Enterprises
11	18	Herb Thomas	'54 Hudson	Arden Mounts
12	72	John Dodd, Sr.	'53 Hudson	John Dodd, Sr.
13	18	John Dodd, Jr.	'53 Hudson	John Dodd, Jr.
13	300	Tim Flock	'55 Chrysler	Carl Kiekhaefer
14	58	Tommy Ringstaff	'55 Packard	J.B. Cunningham
15	5	Jimmie Lewallen	'54 Mercury	Joe Blair
16	59	Blackie Pitt	'54 Oldsmobile	Brownie Pitt
17	28	Eddie Skinner	'53 Oldsmobile	Frank Dodge
18	6	Ralph Liguori	'54 Mercury	Ralph Liguori
19	80	Jimmy Thompson	'53 Hudson	unknown
20	98	Dave Terrell	'53 Oldsmobile	Dave Terrell
21	57	Boyce Hildreth	'53 Hudson	Elton Hildreth
22	460	Gene Simpson	'55 Plymouth	Brooks Brothers

=== Finishing order ===
Section reference:

1. Buck Baker† (No. 87)
2. Dick Rathmann† (No. 3)
3. Curtis Turner† (No. 99)
4. Lee Petty† (No. 42)
5. Eddie Skinner (No. 28)
6. Dave Terrell (No. 98)
7. Jimmie Lewallen† (No. 5)
8. Gene Simpson (No. 460)
9. Joel Million (No. 88)
10. Blackie Pitt† (No. 59)
11. Tommy Ringstaff* (No. 58)
12. John Dodd, Sr.* (No. 72)
13. Tim Flock*† (No. 300)
14. Herb Thomas*† (No. 18)
15. Jimmy Thompson* (No. 80)
16. Jim Paschal*† (No. 78)
17. John Dodd, Jr.* (No. 73)
18. Junior Johnson* (No. 55)
19. Dink Widenhouse* (No. B-29)
20. Fonty Flock*† (No. 14)
21. Ralph Liguori*† (No. 6)
22. Boyce Hildreth* (No. 57)

* denotes that the driver failed to finish the race
† signifies that the driver is known to be deceased

== Timeline ==
Section reference:

- Start of race: Buck Baker was leading the other drivers as the green flag was waved.
- Lap 5: Boyce Hildreth's vehicle had a problematic gasket.
- Lap 16: The tires on Ralph Liguori's vehicle developed problems.
- Lap 33: The axle on Fonty Flock's vehicle became problematic.
- Lap 56: Dink Widenhouse fell out with engine failure.
- Lap 58: A bearing came loose of Junior Johnson's vehicle.
- Lap 64: John Dodd, Jr.'s vehicle had a problematic gasket.
- Lap 70: The vapor lock on Jim Paschal's vehicle stopped working properly.
- Lap 84: The frame on Jimmy Thompson's vehicle came off in an unsafe manner.
- Lap 105: One of the wheels came off Herb Thomas' vehicle.
- Lap 106: Coil issues managed to send Tim Flock to the sidelines.
- Lap 109: A problematic spindle ended John Dodd, Sr.'s chances of winning the race.
- Lap 126: The axle on Tommy Ringstaff's vehicle became problematic.
- Finish: Buck Baker was officially declared the winner of the event.

Preceded by 1954	Wilkes County 160 races 1955	Succeeded by 1956
