= 1956 Old Dominion 400 =

Auto race held at Martinsville Speedway in 1956

Race details
- Race 54 of 56 in the 1956 NASCAR Grand National Series season
- A map showing the layout of Martinsville Speedway
- Date: October 28, 1956
- Official name: Old Dominion 400
- Location: Martinsville Speedway, Martinsville, Virginia
- Course: Permanent racing facility
- Course length: 0.500 miles (0.804 km)
- Distance: 400 laps, 200 mi (321 km)
- Weather: Cold with temperatures of 60.1 °F (15.6 °C); wind speeds of 8 miles per hour (13 km/h)
- Average speed: 61.136 miles per hour (98.389 km/h)
- Attendance: 9,500

Pole position
Driver	Buck Baker	Carl Kiekhaefer

Most laps led
Driver	Jack Smith	Carl Kiekhaefer
- Laps: 185

Winner
No. 402	Jack Smith	Carl Kiekhaefer

Television in the United States
- Network: untelevised
- Announcers: none

The 1956 Old Dominion 400 was a NASCAR event that was held on October 28, 1956, at Martinsville Speedway in Martinsville, Virginia. As a NASCAR-sanctioned "Sweepstakes" race, sedan vehicles from the NASCAR Grand National Series and stock convertibles from the NASCAR Convertible Division raced side-by-side with other for the same amount of money and championship points.

== Background ==
Martinsville Speedway is one of five short tracks to hold NASCAR races. The standard track at Martinsville Speedway is a four-turn short oval track that is 0.526 miles (0.847 km) long. The track's turns are banked at eleven degrees, while the front stretch, the location of the finish line, is banked at zero degrees. The back stretch also has a zero degree banking.

== Race report ==
Four hundred laps were completed on a paved oval track spanning 0.500 miles (0.805 km) for a grand total of 200.0 miles (321.9 km). The race took three hours, sixteen minutes, and seventeen seconds to complete with four caution flags. Forty vehicles would qualify to start this race; a large amount for the NASCAR Cup Series in its formative years.

Nine thousand and five hundred fans attended to see Jack Smith win the race in his 1956 Dodge vehicle (beating thirty-nine other drivers in the process). A Canadian named Norman Schihl participated in the race and finished 23rd; making his only Grand National appearance. Notable speeds were: 61.136 miles per hour (98.389 km/h) for the average speed and 67.643 miles per hour (108.861 km/h) for the pole position speed. Bun Emery makes his only Cup start and comes home with a top-20 finish although he 36 laps down at the checkered flag.

While some multi-car teams were present in the race, the majority of drivers had an owner that wasn't incorporated into a team. Jack Smith officially became the fiftieth different driver to win what is now known as a Cup Series race. Total winnings for this race were $11,739 ($139,014 when considering inflation). The winner (Jack Smith) would receive $2,264 ($26,811 when considering inflation) being awarded to him while last place finisher Jimmie Lewallen would walk away with $100 ($1,184 when considering inflation).

Larry Frank, Bill Lutz, Larry Odo, and Bill Poor would make their NASCAR debut in this race. Carl Kiekhaefer was one of the notable crew chiefs for this race.

=== Qualifying ===
Grid	No.	Driver	Manufacturer
1	00	Buck Baker	'56 Chrysler
2	82	Joe Eubanks	'56 Ford
3	300	Speedy Thompson	'56 Chrysler
4	26	Curtis Turner	'56 Ford
5	97	Bill Amick	'56 Ford
6	21	Glen Wood	'56 Ford
7	42	Lee Petty	'56 Dodge
8	86	Don Oldenberg	'55 Buick
9	95	Don Duell	'56 Ford
10	2	Bill Lutz	'56 Ford
11	12	Ralph Moody	'56 Ford
12	72	Joe Weatherly	'56 Ford
13	64	Johnny Allen	'56 Plymouth
14	49	Bob Welborn	'56 Chevrolet
15	4	Billy Myers	'56 Mercury
16	34	Gwyn Staley	'56 Chevrolet
17	X	Rex White	'56 Ford
18	7	Larry Odo	'56 Chevrolet
19	22	Fireball Roberts	'56 Ford
20	33	Jimmy Massey	'56 Chevrolet
21	98	Marvin Panch	'56 Ford
22	48	Jimmie Lewallen	'56 Ford
23	502	Jack Smith	'56 Dodge
24	15	Tom Pistone	'56 Chevrolet
25	29	Billy Carden	'56 Ford
26	76	Larry Frank	'56 Chevrolet
27	83	Johnny Dodson	'56 Chevrolet
28	55	Mel Larson	'56 Ford
29	50	Frank Mundy	'56 Dodge
30	71	Bill Poor	'56 Chevrolet

=== Finishing order ===
Section reference:

1. Jack Smith† (No. 502)
2. Marvin Panch (No. 98)
3. Bill Amick† (No. 97)
4. Speedy Thompson† (No. 300)
5. Fireball Roberts† (No. 22)
6. Joe Weatherly† (No. 72)
7. Buck Baker† (No. 00)
8. Bunk Moore (No. 35)
9. Frank Mundy† (No. 50)
10. Gwyn Staley† (No. 34)
11. Jimmy Massey (No. 33)
12. Paul Goldsmith (No. 3)
13. Billy Myers (No. 4)
14. Johnny Allen (No. 64)
15. Bob Welborn† (No. 49)
16. Don Oldenberg (No. 86)
17. Bill Poor (No. 71)
18. Bun Emery (No. 99)
19. Larry Odo (No. 7)
20. Tiny Lund† (No. 16)
21. Lee Petty† (No. 42)
22. Bobby Keck† (No. 14)
23. Norman Schihl (No. 23)
24. Art Brinkley (No. 44)
25. Johnny Dodson (No. 83)
26. Billy Rafter (No. 41)
27. Bill Champion† (No. 31)
28. Curtis Turner*† (No. 26)
29. Bob Duell* (No. 95)
30. Ralph Moody*† (No. 12)
31. Jim Paschal*† (No. 75)
32. Rex White* (No. X)
33. Glen Wood*† (No. 21)
34. Tom Pistone* (No. 15)
35. Joe Eubanks*† (No. 82)
36. Billy Carden*† (No. 29)
37. Mel Carson* (No. 55)
38. Larry Frank*† (No. 76)
39. Bill Lutz* (No. 2)
40. Jimmie Lewallen*† (No. 48)

* Driver failed to finish race
† signifies that the driver is known to be deceased

== Timeline ==
Section reference:

- Start of race: Joe Eubanks had the pole position to start the race.
- Lap 11: Fuel pump issues forced Jimmie Lewallen to become the last-place finisher.
- Lap 62: Bill Lutz managed to blow his engine while racing.
- Lap 77: Oil pressure issues forced Larry Frank out of the race, Mel Larson had to deal with a troublesome piston.
- Lap 87: The RF hub on Billy Carden's vehicle had problems that were terminal enough to knock him out of the race.
- Lap 103: The RF lugs were acting problematically on Joe Eubanks' car, forcing his exit from the race.
- Lap 104: Speedy Thompson took over the lead from Joe Eubanks.
- Lap 106: Tom Pistone had some problems with his connecting rod and had to leave the event.
- Lap 110: Glen Wood managed to blow his engine while racing.
- Lap 143: Rex White managed to blow his engine while racing.
- Lap 163: Jim Paschal managed to blow his engine while racing.
- Lap 179: Jack Smith took over the lead from Speedy Thompson.
- Lap 183: The rear end of Ralph Moody's vehicle came off in an unsafe manner to continue racing.
- Lap 189: Fireball Roberts took over the lead from Jack Smith.
- Lap 201: Bill Amick took over the lead from Fireball Roberts.
- Lap 210: Marvin Panch took over the lead from Bill Amick.
- Lap 226: Jack Smith took over the lead from Marvin Panch.
- Lap 245: Bob Duell managed to overheat his vehicle.
- Lap 299: Curtis Turner managed to blow his engine while racing.
- Finish: Jack Smith was officially declared the winner of the event.

Preceded by 1956 untitled race at Cleveland County Fairgrounds	NASCAR Grand National Series Season; 1956	Succeeded by 1956 Buddy Shuman 250
