= Widenhouse =

Widenhouse is a surname. Notable people with the surname include:

- Bill Widenhouse (1929–1995), American racing driver
- Dink Widenhouse (1932–2024), American racing driver
