= Don Duckworth =

American racecar driver

- Born: Gray Court, South Carolina, U.S.

NASCAR Cup Series career
- 1 race run over 1 year
- Best finish: 204th – 1955 NASCAR Grand National Series season
- First race: 1955 Southern 500 (Darlington Raceway)
- Last race: 1955 Southern 500 (Darlington Raceway)
Wins	Top tens	Poles
0	0	0

Donald Duckworth is a retired NASCAR Grand National Series driver from Gray Court, South Carolina, US.

== Career ==
Duckworth made his sole Cup Series appearance at the 1955 Southern 500 under the Woodruff Motors sponsorship livery while driving a 1955 Chevrolet.

In the 1955 Southern 500, Duckworth qualified 40th and finished 55th after Arden Mounts crashed into his stalled vehicle on lap 147. While Bill Champion managed to avoid Duckworth by swerving past the vehicle rapidly, Mounts did not see the stalled vehicle it was until too late to avoid him. Duckworth earned $50 ($600.93 when adjusted for inflation).

Despite his very brief career, Duckworth's appearance on filmed media increased his visibility, compared to other drivers with similarly brief careers.
