= Norm Nelson =

American racing driver (1923–1988)

- Born: Norman Huber Nelson; January 30, 1923 Racine, Wisconsin, U.S.
- Died: November 8, 1988 (aged 65) Milwaukee, Wisconsin, U.S.

Championship titles
- USAC Stock Car (1960, 1965, 1966)

AAA/USAC Stock Car career
- Years active: 1950–1974, 1976
- Championships: 3
- Best finish: 1st in 1960, 1965, 1966

NASCAR Cup Series career
- 5 races run over 4 years
- Best finish: 68th (1955)
- First race: 1955 Race 40 (LeHi)
- Last race: 1968 Motor Trend 500 (Riverside)
- First win: 1955 Race 43 (Las Vegas)
| Wins | Top tens | Poles |
|---|---|---|
| 1 | 3 | 1 |

Norman Huber Nelson (January 30, 1923 – November 8, 1988) was an American racing driver. Known primarily for his stock car career, Nelson competed in AAA and USAC Stock Cars from the 1950s through 1970s. He won the season championship in 1960, 1965, and 1966 as a driver.

Nelson also won five owner's championships. He competed in five NASCAR Grand National Series events and won one. He had 35 USAC victories including 11 at the Milwaukee Mile near his hometown Racine, Wisconsin. He was nicknamed "The Great Dane" because he was 6 feet 4 inches tall.

== Racing career ==
=== Early career ===
Nelson prepared for racing when, as a 14-year-old, he borrowed his sister's 1934 Chevrolet and he raced it on the back streets of Racine. He competed for the first time on a rainy 1939 afternoon race in a swampy field near Pleasant Prairie. His first race ended when his jalopy got stuck on the straightaway. He continued in the car until the 1940-41 winter indoor series, when he got a ride in a midget car at the Chicago Amphitheater. He ended up driving the midget into the wall in the first corner. Racing in the United States ended for World War II and he served the United States Army as a tank operator. After the war ended, he returned to successfully race midget cars. He stopped racing midgets in favor of late model stock cars so he could race more frequently.

Nelson had been introduced to stock car racing in 1948 when Milwaukee promoter Tom Marchese brought stock cars to the region. Nelson said "Once I got into stock car racing, I knew that it was for me. I couldn't get into just any midget. We always had to make special ones for me." He raced in his first stock car race on the dirt of the Milwaukee Mile in 1948 and finished third in the 100 miles (160 km) event.

=== AAA and USAC ===
In 1950, Nelson was racing the American Automobile Association (AAA) Stock Car division in its first season and was leading the national points going into the final race at the Springfield Mile. Second-place driver Jay Frank was the only driver who could catch him in the points and he had to win while Nelson had to not finish the race. "That's exactly what happened", Nelson said. "The engine on my Oldsmobile blew and he won the race."

During a condensed 1951 season, Nelson lost all of his points earned for winning a race at Milwaukee after the AAA Contest Board determined he had used an illegal gear. He was using a special mountain gear in his Oldsmobile; he pointed out (to no avail) that the part could be found in a parts catalog. Nelson won the following race, also at Milwaukee, and the points he lost would have made him the 1951 champion, which instead was won by Rodger Ward. Nelson continued to race in AAA Stock Car races in 1952, 1953, and 1954 with less success - collecting top-five finishes at Toledo Raceway Park, Dayton Speedway, Illiana Speedway, and Milwaukee.

Nelson joined up with Carl Kiekhaefer's Chrysler team in 1955. He won a 1955 stock car race at the Milwaukee Mile and blew his right front tire right after winning the race causing the car to skid into the walls. Nelson's crew had done their pit stop in 1 minute and second-place finisher Marshall Teague had a 1-minute and 40 seconds stop. He raced at Wilmot Speedway in Kenosha in 1959 and won the track's modified stock class. He returned to driving at the national level, and finished third in 1958 and 1959. For the first time in his career, Nelson drove in someone else's car when Bill Trainor hired him to race. He won a race at the DuQuoin State Fairgrounds Racetrack and had several second-place finishes during his 1960 championship season.

Beginning in 1963, Nelson hired Gerald Kulwicki (Alan Kulwicki's father) to build engines for his race cars. Nelson began his 25th season of racing in 1965 by winning the season-opening USAC Stock Car race at Milwaukee over Paul Goldsmith. Nelson took the lead away from Parnelli Jones when his engine blew up late in the race. Three NASCAR drivers competed in the event - Richard Petty, David Pearson, and Bobby Isaac.

Nelson won the Yankee 300 race at Indianapolis Raceway Park in 1965 which contributed toward him winning his second driver's championship that season. Nelson won the 150-mile event at Langhorne Speedway in 1966 and he won his third season championship. He also won his second straight Yankee 300 at IRP.

When Nelson retired from driving in 1976 because of detached retina, he was tied with A. J. Foyt for second on the all-time USAC victories list with 35 wins.

=== NASCAR ===
Nelson made five starts in his Grand National career. He made his first start at the 1955 LeHi 300 in LeHi, Arkansas, and won his only NASCAR race later that season after starting on the pole position at the only NASCAR race held at the 1-mile dirt Las Vegas Park Speedway. While driving for Carl Kiekhaefer's championship team, he led the final 106 laps of a 111 lap race which was shortened from its original 200 lap distance because of darkness. He competed in three more NASCAR races, once each in 1966, 1967 at Riverside (finishing third behind fellow USAC regulars Parnelli Jones and Paul Goldsmith), and 1968.

== Owner ==
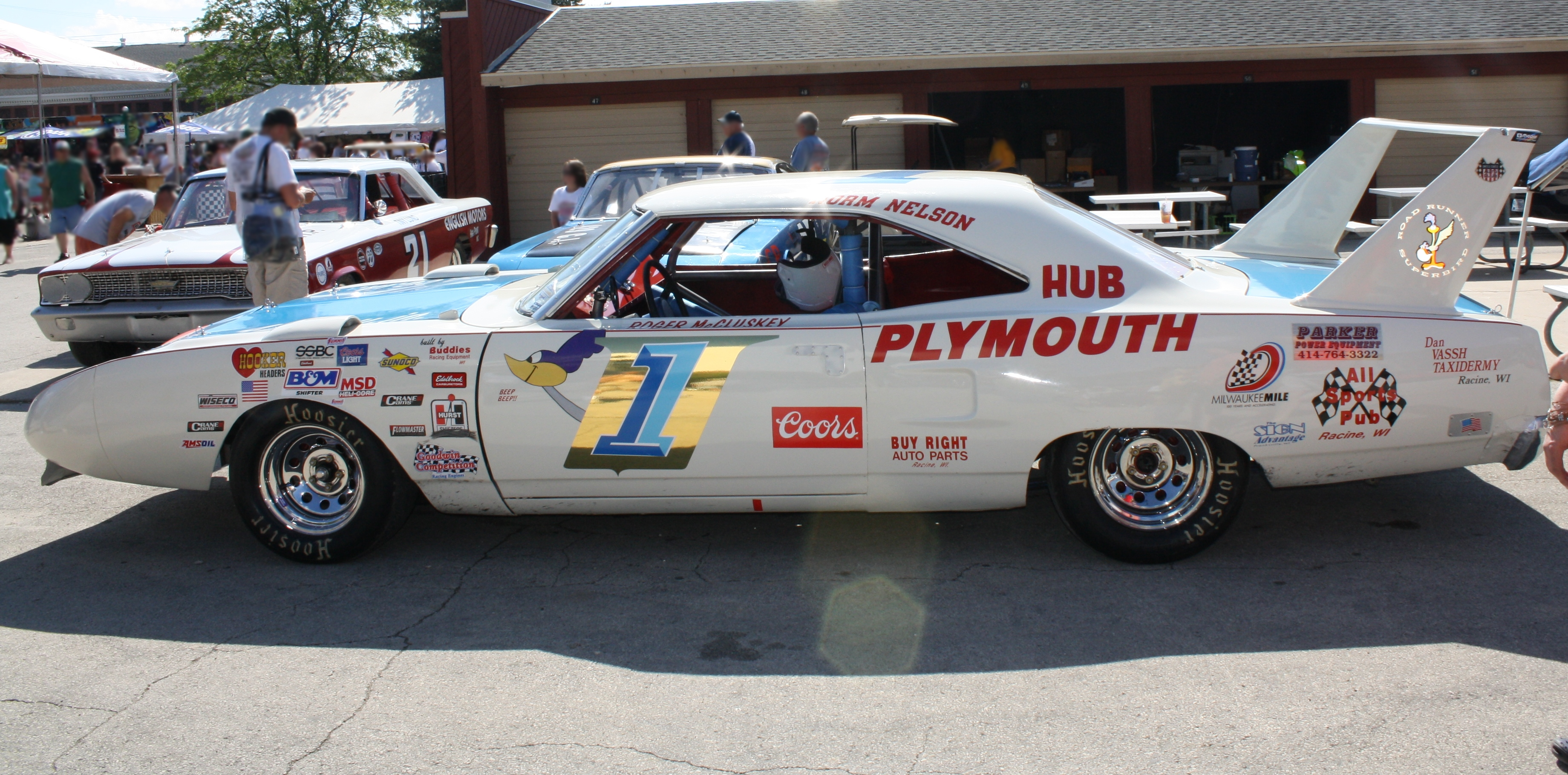
Nelson-owned USAC Stock Car driven by Roger McCluskey

Even before Nelson's career began to wind down, he began having other racers drive in his USAC car. He hired Roger McCluskey to drive for him in 1968, starting a two-car operation as Nelson began to wind down his career. In 1975, McCluskey had to miss a race because he had a burned foot; Nelson drove the car for him. Other drivers include A. J. Foyt.

Nelson's cars started in 13 NASCAR; nine of these races ended in a top-ten finish; five with a top-five. Jim Hurtubise drove Nelson's only win as a car owner at Atlanta International Raceway in the 1966 Atlanta 500.

== Personality ==
Nelson was known for saving his equipment until the latter stages of a race. Alan Kulwicki said, "I can remember guys like A. J. Foyt and Parnelli Jones drove against him, and Norm wasn't as much a charger as those guys, but he was always there at the end of a race. Because he owned his own cars, he didn't run them as hard as those other guys did." Kulwicki added, "He was a good, smooth driver and very intelligent."

== Personal life ==
Nelson and his wife Caroline had eight children. He also had 15+ grandchildren. During the racing off-season, he owned a snowmobile sales and repair shop in Racine called "Nelson Enterprises". Caroline and several of their children worked at the shop.

== Death ==
Nelson died on November 8, 1988, while at the Zablocki Veterans Administration Center at age 65 and he was buried at the Graceland Cemetery in Racine.

== Awards and honors ==
Nelson has been inducted into the following halls of fame:

- Southeastern Wisconsin Short Track Hall of Fame (2009)
- Racine County Sports Hall of Fame (2011)
- United States Auto Club (USAC) Hall of Fame (2014)

Sporting positions
| Preceded by Fred Lorenzen | USAC Stock Car Champion; 1960 | Succeeded by Paul Goldsmith |
| Preceded by Parnelli Jones | USAC Stock Car Champion; 1965–1966 | Succeeded by Don White |
