= Ray Platte =

- Born: Raymond George Platte, Jr. September 3, 1925; Norfolk, Virginia, U.S.
- Died: July 21, 1963 (aged 37); Durham, North Carolina, U.S.
- Cause of death: Head injuries from racing accident

NASCAR Cup Series career
- 1 race run over 1 year
- First race: 1955 Southern 500 (Darlington)
Wins	Top tens	Poles
0	0	0

Raymond George Platte Jr. (September 3, 1925 – July 21, 1963) was a NASCAR Grand National driver from the American town of Norfolk, Virginia.

Platte only competed in the 1955 Southern 500, racing for Harry Parry in a Chevrolet with a 25th-place finish. In the process, he won $100 ($1,201.86 when adjusted for inflation) for his single-race NASCAR career.

The "Virginia Gentleman" crashed into a wall during a 100-lap race at South Boston Speedway, sustaining a skull fracture. He died the following day.
