= Harry Parry (NASCAR owner) =

Harry Parry (possibly from the Darlington, South Carolina area) was a NASCAR Grand National race car owner who employed Ray Platte for the 1955 Southern 500 only. Parry never bothered to employ race car drivers for another race because he only won $100 ($1,173.79 when adjusted for inflation) for his attempt as a NASCAR owner.
