= Larry Flynn =

Former NASCAR driver

- Larry Flynn, 1966
- Born: April 10, 1930; Holly Hill, Florida, U.S.
- Died: September 14, 2007 (aged 77)
- Cause of death: Diabetes complications

NASCAR Cup Series career
- 8 races run over 4 years
- Best finish: 28th (1955)
- First race: 1955 Southern 500 (Darlington)
- Last race: 1961 Rebel 300 (Darlington)
Wins	Top tens	Poles
0	1	0

Larry Flynn (April 10, 1930 – September 14, 2007), of Holly Hill, Florida, was an American NASCAR Grand National race car driver that competed in eight races from 1955 to 1961.

== Career ==
Prior to 1955, Flynn would compete exclusively at the Daytona Beach Road Course for the "Modified" and "Sportsman" divisions of NASCAR. He would drive Ford vehicles from the late 1930s during his formative years in professional stock car racing. As a competitor in the 1955 Southern 500, he had the fastest finishing Ford in the race with a fifth-place finish. Flynn's impressive accomplishment gave credibility to the Ford racing teams that were racing in NASCAR during that era. During the 1956 Southern 500, he would crash into fellow NASCAR driver Bill Brown in an incident that would cause the fence to be temporarily broken.

Flynn's total career earnings in the NASCAR Grand National Series were considered to be $1,700 ($18,315.7 when adjusted for inflation) and he finished 1162 laps (1439.6 miles) of racing. Flynn also racked up a single top-five finish in addition to his only top-ten finish. After suffering from complications due to his diabetes, Flynn would die in 2007 at the age of 77. Most of the races in Larry's NASCAR Cup Series career were done as a driver/owner. However, he would race in the 1955 Southern 500 under the employment of Mr. W.R. Waldon.

In 1970, Flynn won the Bobby McKim Memorial Race at the 0.375-mile (0.604 km) DeLand Drive-In Raceway, having set the fastest qualifying time for the event. His ultimate retirement from motorsports came from a 68th-place finish at an International Supermodified Association (ISMA) race at Daytona International Speedway on February 1, 1976.

In 1955, Flynn finished second at Langhorne which was a major Modified-Sportsman race.
