= Holly Hill, Florida =

- City
- City of Holly Hill
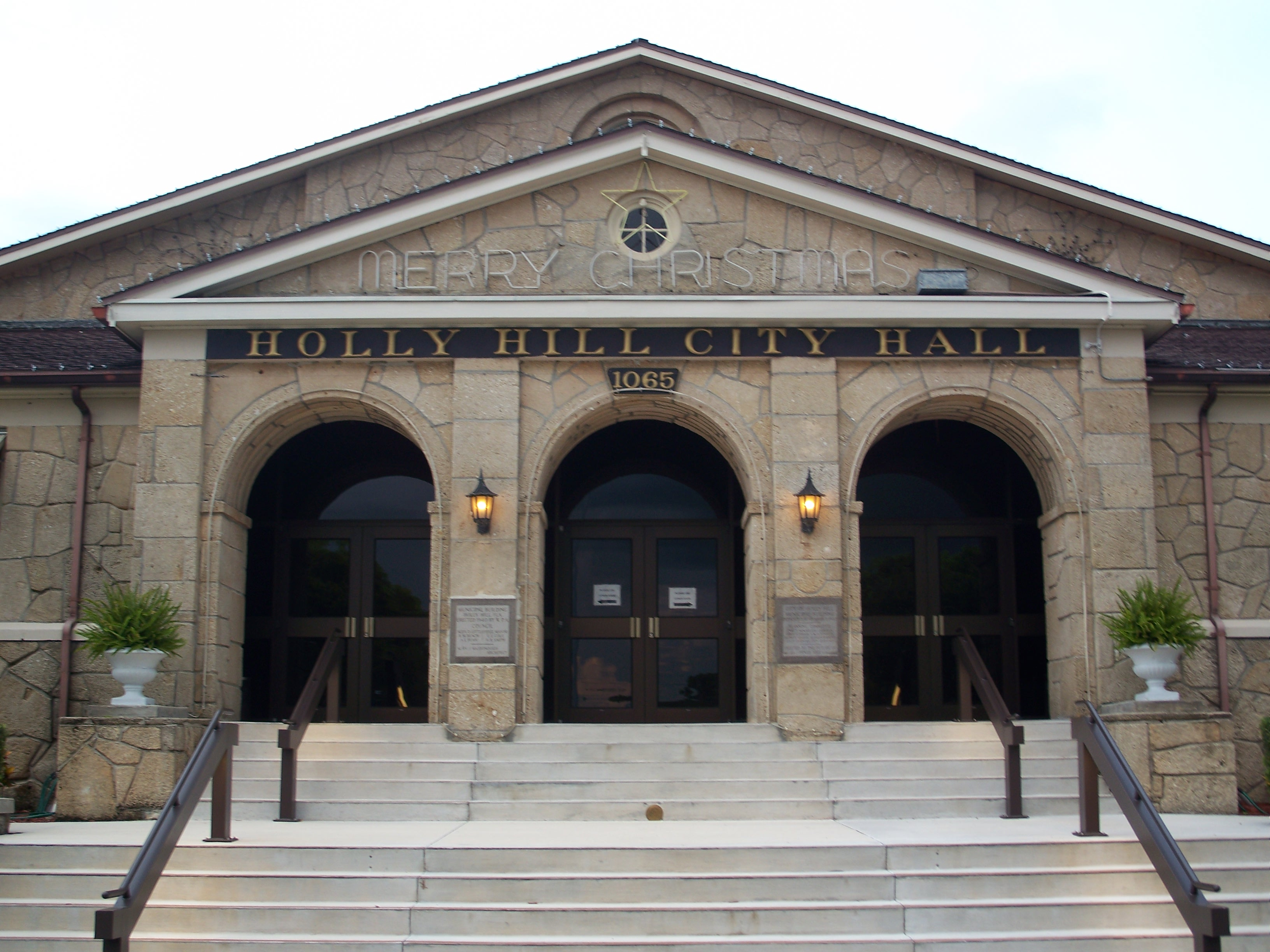
- The Holly Hill City Hall in 2007.

- Seal Logo

- Location in Volusia County and the state of Florida
- Coordinates: 29°14′58″N 81°02′56″W
- Country: United States
- State: Florida
- County: Volusia
- Incorporated (city): July 1, 1901

Government
  - Type: Commission-Manager

Area
  - Total: 4.53 sq mi (11.72 km^{2})
  - Land: 3.96 sq mi (10.26 km^{2})
  - Water: 0.56 sq mi (1.46 km^{2})
- Elevation: 7 ft (2.1 m)

Population (2020)
  - Total: 12,958
  - Density: 3,272.5/sq mi (1,263.51/km^{2})
- Time zone: UTC-5 (Eastern (EST))
  - Summer (DST): UTC-4 (EDT)
- ZIP code: 32117
- Area code: 386
- FIPS code: 12-31350
- GNIS feature ID: 2404715
- Website: https://www.hollyhillfl.org

Holly Hill is a city in Volusia County, Florida, United States. Holly Hill's city limits lie entirely on the Florida mainland, unlike the larger cities on either side of it, Daytona Beach and Ormond Beach, which encompass both the mainland and the beachfront barrier island across the Halifax River. The population was 12,958 at the 2020 census.

== Geography ==
According to the United States Census Bureau, the city has a total area of 4.5 square miles (12 km^{2}), of which 3.9 square miles (10 km^{2}) is land and 0.6 square miles (1.6 km^{2}) (13.94%) is water.

== History ==
Holly Hill was incorporated on July 1, 1901. The original intention for incorporation was to force local owners of razorback hogs to keep their livestock penned up.

== Demographics ==
Historical population
Census	Pop.	Note	%±
1910	207		—
1920	332		60.4%
1930	1,146		245.2%
1940	1,665		45.3%
1950	3,232		94.1%
1960	4,182		29.4%
1970	8,191		95.9%
1980	9,953		21.5%
1990	11,141		11.9%
2000	12,119		8.8%
2010	11,659		−3.8%
2020	12,958		11.1%
U.S. Decennial Census

=== Racial and ethnic composition ===
Holly Hill racial composition (Hispanics excluded from racial categories) (NH = Non-Hispanic)
Race	Pop 2010	Pop 2020	% 2010	% 2020
White (NH)	8,727	8,680	74.85%	66.99%
Black or African American (NH)	1,711	2,184	14.68%	16.85%
Native American or Alaska Native (NH)	58	47	0.50%	0.36%
Asian (NH)	108	165	0.93%	1.27%
Pacific Islander or Native Hawaiian (NH)	3	8	0.03%	0.06%
Some other race (NH)	29	71	0.25%	0.55%
Two or more races/Multiracial (NH)	235	562	2.02%	4.34%
Hispanic or Latino (any race)	788	1,241	6.76%	9.58%
Total	11,659	12,958		

=== 2020 census ===
As of the 2020 census, Holly Hill had a population of 12,958. The median age was 48.0 years. 17.6% of residents were under the age of 18 and 23.8% of residents were 65 years of age or older. For every 100 females there were 92.9 males, and for every 100 females age 18 and over there were 91.2 males age 18 and over.

100.0% of residents lived in urban areas, while 0.0% lived in rural areas.

There were 5,951 households in Holly Hill, of which 21.8% had children under the age of 18 living in them. Of all households, 29.6% were married-couple households, 24.9% were households with a male householder and no spouse or partner present, and 35.1% were households with a female householder and no spouse or partner present. About 36.2% of all households were made up of individuals and 17.7% had someone living alone who was 65 years of age or older.

There were 6,907 housing units, of which 13.8% were vacant. The homeowner vacancy rate was 4.5% and the rental vacancy rate was 9.2%.

=== 2016-2020 ACS estimates ===
The 2016-2020 American Community Survey estimated that there were 2,695 families residing in the city.

=== 2010 census ===
As of the 2010 United States census, there were 11,659 people, 5,388 households, and 2,592 families residing in the city.

=== 2000 census ===
At the 2000 census there were 12,119 people in 5,583 households, including 2,998 families, in the city. The population density was 3,113.5 inhabitants per square mile (1,202.1/km^{2}). There were 6,148 housing units at an average density of 1,579.5 units per square mile (609.8 units/km^{2}). The racial makeup of the city was 87.10% White, 8.97% African American, 0.36% Native American, 1.00% Asian, 0.02% Pacific Islander, 0.91% from other races, and 1.63% from two or more races. Hispanic or Latino of any race were 3.69%.

Of the 5,583 households in 2000, 22.3% had children under the age of 18 living with them, 34.9% were married couples living together, 13.6% had a female householder with no husband present, and 46.3% were non-families. 36.9% of households were one person and 17.2% were one person aged 65 or older. The average household size was 2.14 and the average family size was 2.77.

In 2000, the age distribution was 19.9% under the age of 18, 7.0% from 18 to 24, 28.4% from 25 to 44, 23.5% from 45 to 64, and 21.2% 65 or older. The median age was 42 years. For every 100 females, there were 91.5 males. For every 100 females age 18 and over, there were 87.6 males.

In 2000, the median household income was $26,651 and the median family income was $29,154. Males had a median income of $25,946 versus $19,178 for females. The per capita income for the city was $16,098. About 13.5% of families and 16.5% of the population were below the poverty line, including 23.4% of those under age 18 and 12.1% of those age 65 or over.

== Government ==
Holly Hill's form of government is commission-manager.

=== Elected city officials ===
- Chris Via, Mayor
- John Penny, Vice Mayor and City Commissioner, District 1
- Penny Currie, City Commissioner, District 2
- John C. Danio, City Commissioner, District 3
- Roy Johnson, City Commissioner, District 4

=== Appointed ===
- Joseph Forte, City Manager
- Valerie Manning, City Clerk
- Scott Simpson, City Attorney
- Byron Williams, Chief of Police

== Notable people ==
- Dimitri Diatchenko, actor
- Larry Flynn, racing driver
- William S. McCoy, lived and worked in Holly Hill as a skilled yacht builder
