= Marion Cox =

American racecar executive

- Born: October 2, 1920; South Carolina, US
- Died: October 13, 1996 (aged 76); Hemingway, South Carolina, US
- Occupation: NASCAR car owner
- Spouse: Nina

Marion "Preacher" Cox (October 2, 1920 – October 13, 1996) was a NASCAR Grand National Series car owner. He would serve more than two years in World War II.

== Career ==
Cox provided a vehicle for now-retired NASCAR Grand National series driver Roy Bentley in four races that would take place in the 1955 and 1956 seasons. Darrell Waltrip, Richard Childress, and Cale Yarborough have raced for Cox (in the lesser known series of NASCAR) and have become three of the biggest names in the NASCAR Cup Series. Childress went on to own Richard Childress Racing while Waltrip became an announcer for Fox NASCAR. Even though Yarborough had his championship wins record broken by Jimmie Johnson (in 2009) after defending it since 1978, he is still notable for being employed under Cox. Cox fielded Chevrolet vehicles in the 1955 season but switched to Ford vehicles in the 1956 season.

All of his vehicles were created right out of his garage (with the formal business name being Marion Cox Garage) which was located in Hemingway, South Carolina. Due to his religious beliefs, Cox never allowed his vehicles to race on a Sunday (keeping him out of most of the Grand National Series races).

During the 1970s, he pulled out one of his cars out of the race before it ended because the numerous delays made the race continue into Sunday. he died of dementia on October 13, 1996 at age 76
