= Yankee 300 =

American auto race

USAC Stock Car
- Venue: Indianapolis Raceway Park
- First race: 1963
- Last race: 1972
- Distance: 300 mi (480 km)
- Most wins (driver): A.J. Foyt (3)
- Most wins (team): Norm Nelson (4)
- Most wins (manufacturer): Ford (5)

The Yankee 300 was a stock car race held at the Indianapolis Raceway Park road course and sanctioned by the United States Auto Club (USAC). It was run most years during the first weekend of May, serving as an unofficial kickoff to the Month of May in Indianapolis. One of the premier races on the USAC Stock Car series calendar, the event was held in high prestige for a period of time, and was occasionally contested by drivers from the rival National Association for Stock Car Auto Racing (NASCAR) circuit. The inaugural event was run in 1963.

== Race winners ==
Year	Date	Winning driver	Team	Manufacturer	Laps	Miles	Course Length
1963	April 28	A. J. Foyt	Norm Nelson	Plymouth	120	300	2.5mi
1964	May 3	Fred Lorenzen		Ford	120	300	2.5mi
1965	May 2	Norm Nelson	Norm Nelson	Plymouth	120	300	2.5mi
1966	May 1	Norm Nelson	Norm Nelson	Plymouth	160	300	1.875mi
1967	May 27	Parnelli Jones	Holman-Moody	Ford	160	300	1.875mi
1968	May 5	A. J. Foyt	Jack Bowsher	Ford	100	250	2.5mi
1969	May 4	Parnelli Jones	Holman-Moody	Ford	100	250	2.5mi
1970	May 3	A. J. Foyt	Jack Bowsher	Ford	100	250	2.5mi
1971	Not held						
1972	July 23	Roger McCluskey	Norm Nelson	Plymouth	100	250	2.5mi
