= Charlie Schwam =

NASCAR team owner

- Occupation: NASCAR car owner
- Known for: Employing some of the best NASCAR Cup Series drivers in the 1950s

Charlie Schwam is a former NASCAR Grand National Series race car owner whose career spanned from 1955 to 1956.

== Summary ==
Schwam painted his vehicles in a bright shade of purple and would have cartoon boars on the vehicles. As the owner of a Ford dealership; Schawn brought Ford vehicles into the NASCAR races that he was involved in. He would play a role in helping Ford vehicles become faster than the Chryslers and Chevrolets that dominated NASCAR during the mid-1950s.

Schwam's employees included Billy Carden, Curtis Turner, and Joe Weatherly. Out of 38 races, Schwam's vehicles have created one win for themselves (at the 1956 Southern 500) in addition to ten finishes in the "top-five" and 18 finishes in the "top-ten." They have led 461 laps out of 5455 and have finished an average of 17th place overall. The number of miles that these three drivers have raced for Schwam equals 4,789.5 miles (7,708.0 km). Schwam seemed to have favored the numbers 9 and 99 for his vehicles while numbers 11, 19 and 95 were rarely considered.

Schwam's total earnings for his NASCAR career was $21,310 ($252,355.26 when adjusted for inflation).
