= Nace Mattingly =

Racecar driver from Maryland

- Born: Bernard Ignatius Mattingly; January 21, 1921; Leonardtown, Maryland, U.S.
- Died: November 29, 2000 (aged 79)

NASCAR Cup Series career
- 17 races run over 6 years
- 1963 position: 108th
- Best finish: 36th (1955)
- First race: 1955 Richmond 200 (Richmond)
- Last race: 1963 Race No. 24 (Old Dominion)
Wins	Top tens	Poles
0	5	0

Bernard Ignatius "Nace" Mattingly (January 21, 1921 – November 29, 2000) was an American NASCAR Grand National Cup Series driver from Leonardtown, Maryland.

== Summary ==
He raced in NASCAR from 1955 to 1960; picking up two "top-five" finishes and five "top-ten" finishes. Mattingly drove 2,639 laps and earned a grand total of $2,320 ($25,248.59 when adjusted for inflation). His average start was 20th place while his average finish was in 18th place. Mattingly's only DNQ came at the 1957 Virginia 500. Driving the No. 88 Chrysler for the majority of his career, Mattingly was mostly associated with NASCAR owner Major Melton.

Mattingly's best finishes came at dirt tracks where he would finish an average of 12th place. His worst performances came at road courses where he would finish an average of 36th place. Lincoln Speedway was his most favored track (he would get an average finish of tenth place) while the Daytona Beach and Road Course would be his least favorite track (he would get an average finish of 36th place).

At the 1955 Southern 500, Mattingly qualified in 33rd place using a 1955 Ford vehicle and would end up finishing in 14th place out of 69 drivers; clinching a hard earned $350 in the process ($4,206.52 when adjusted for inflation). The following year at the 1956 Southern 500, Mattingly started in 60th place but would finish in an agonizing 63rd place out of 70 drivers; collecting a paycheck of $50 in the process ($592.11 when adjusted for inflation). At the 1957 Southern 500, Nace Mattingly would qualify in 38th place in his 1957 Ford vehicle. He would go on to finish in 18th place; collecting $200 in the process ($2,292.65 when adjusted for inflation).

Other series that Mattingly competed in include the USAC Stock Car Series, the ARCA Racing Series and the NASCAR Short Track Division.
