= George Parrish (racing driver) =

American racing driver (1928–2016)

- Born: August 29, 1928; Henderson, North Carolina, U.S.
- Died: February 20, 2016 (aged 87)

NASCAR Cup Series career
- 21 races run over 4 years
- Best finish: 42nd - 1955 NASCAR Grand National season
- First race: 1954 untitled race (Southern States Fairgrounds)
- Last race: 1958 untitled race (Champion Speedway)
| Wins | Top tens | Poles |
|---|---|---|
| 0 | 1 | 0 |

George W. Parrish (August 29, 1928 – February 20, 2016) was an American NASCAR Grand National driver from Henderson, North Carolina.

== Career summary ==
Parrish competed in 1,987 laps of NASCAR stock car racing – the equivalent of 1,551.7 miles or 2,497.2 kilometres. Parrish has earned a grand total of $1,150 ($12,833.04 when adjusted for inflation) through his entire NASCAR Grand National Series career and was a participant of the 1955 Southern 500 which has been recorded on VHS and DVD.

Parrish's average career start was 23rd while his average career finish was also 23rd. This means that Parrish was very consistent throughout his racing career. Parrish all of his NASCAR races using a Studebaker; he even first gained his official competition license in a 1953 Studebaker Commander coupé with the racing number 11. The 1955 Richmond 200 was the site of Parrish's only top-ten finish during his entire career (he would finish in tenth place and twenty-four laps behind the winner). Joe Frazier (no relation to the heavyweight boxer) was Parrish's sponsor for his entire career.

== Death ==
Parrish died on February 20, 2016, at the age of 87.
