= Dave Terrell =

American racing driver (born 1931)

- Born: February 21, 1931 (age 95); Newtown, Pennsylvania, U.S.

NASCAR Cup Series career
- 68 races run over 6 years
- Best finish: 12th (1954, 1955)
- First race: 1952 Wilkes County 200 (North Wilkesboro)
- Last race: 1958 untitled race (Wilson)
Wins	Top tens	Poles
0	23	0

Dave Terrell (born February 21, 1931, in Newtown, Pennsylvania, USA) is an American retired NASCAR Grand National Series driver/owner who participated from 1952 to 1957.

== Biography ==
Terrell participated in the 1955 Southern 500. While failing to win a race in his entire career, Terrell managed to get four finishes in the top-five and twenty-three finishes in the top-ten.

Out of 8138 laps (5927.4 miles), Terrell managed to lead nine of them.

Most of the races in the Grand National Series in addition to the NASCAR Convertible Series would see Terrell drive in rides that he owned personally.
