= Bobby Keck =

American race car driver (1934–2011)

Robert "Bobby" Keck
- Born: August 29, 1934; Graham, North Carolina, U.S.
- Died: March 31, 2011 (aged 76)

NASCAR Cup Series career
- 98 races run over 6 years
- Best finish: 12th (1958)
- First race: 1956 race (Wilson Speedway)
- Last race: 1964 race (Orange Speedway)
| Wins | Top tens | Poles |
|---|---|---|
| 0 | 19 | 0 |

Robert Darrell Keck Sr. (August 29, 1934 – March 31, 2011) was an American NASCAR Grand National Series driver who competed from 1956 to 1964. He was born in Graham, North Carolina.

== Career ==
Keck competed in 98 Grand National Series races over six seasons. He qualified for all but one event during his career, failing to make the field for the 1963 Old Dominion 500. Over the course of his career, he completed 7,962.9 miles or 12,815.0 kilometres of competition.

Keck recorded two top-five finishes and 19 top-ten finishes, with an average starting position of 20th and an average finishing position of 17th. His best points finish came in 1958, when he placed 12th in the Grand National Series standings. During his NASCAR career, he earned just over $11,000 in prize money.

Keck began competing in NASCAR at age 21 and retired following the 1964 season at age 29.

Statistically, Keck performed strongest on dirt tracks, where his average finish was 14th. His results were less competitive on intermediate tracks, where his average finish was 23rd.

Throughout his career, Keck primarily drove Ford vehicles.

== Personal life and death ==
Keck was married to Mary Ella Watkins Keck. He was the son of James Edgar Zeck and Ella Mae Zachary Keck. He had children, grandchildren, and great-grandchildren.

Keck died on March 31, 2011, at the age of 76.
