= Jimmy Massey =

American racing driver

- Born: December 1, 1929; Mebane, North Carolina, U.S.
- Died: August 21, 2015 (aged 85)

NASCAR Cup Series career
- 51 races run over 7 years
- Best finish: 13th (1955)
- First race: 1955 untitled race (Raleigh)
- Last race: 1964 Textile 250 (Concord)
Wins	Top tens	Poles
0	28	1

Jimmy Massey (December 1, 1929 – August 21, 2015) was an American NASCAR Grand National driver who competed in 51 races (along with the 1955 Southern 500).

== Career summary ==
Out of these 51 races, there has been twelve finishes in the top-five and twenty-eight finishes in the top ten. Massey's total career earnings was considered to be $14,974 ($155,443.62 when adjusted for inflation). A grand total of 6,638.7 miles (10,684.0 km) and 9891 laps were achieved in his seven-year on-and-off NASCAR Grand National career. By the end of the 1964 season, Massey ended up leading 33 laps and finishing one position better on average than he started. The majority of his races were done in Chevrolet automobiles.

Massey's best accomplishments were on restrictor plate tracks where he finished an average of tenth place while his poorest races were held on tri-oval intermediate tracks; where 27th place would become his average.
