= 1955 NASCAR Grand National Series =

American motorsport season

1955 Grand National Series

Seasons
- ← 1954 1956 →

The 1955 NASCAR Grand National season began on November 7, 1954, and ended on October 30, 1955. Even though the season was resolved in the course of two different years, all NASCAR personnel were allowed to have their traditional two-month silly season that traditionally comes between mid-November and mid-February. Tim Flock won the 1955 championship by a margin of 1508 over top of Buck Baker. This season was unusual because of its 11-month season (as opposed to the current 10-month season format). As the ninth season of the series now known as the Cup Series, most of the drivers involved were still the first-generation race car drivers. They did not have any ties to the stock car racing world through their parents or grandparents although some of them served in World War II prior to their NASCAR careers. However, the generation that would gain notoriety and fame through nepotism (i.e., their father or older brother having a ride before them) would emerge about ten years later. The average horsepower of a stock car competing the 1955 NASCAR Grand National season would be 230 horsepower (approximately 620 less horsepower than the vehicles used in the 2009 NASCAR Sprint Cup season).

The first race of the season was held at Tri-City Speedway in High Point, North Carolina, while the last race of the season was held at Orange Speedway in Hillsboro, North Carolina. During this time, it was customary for the majority of the tracks to be dirt tracks as 40 out of the 45 races were raced in that manner. Dirt track racing helped produce the lower speeds that kept the action safe decades prior to the Car of Tomorrow. The move to paved tracks in later decades would produce dangerous speeds that would cause research to move towards making cars safer to drive as opposed to making cars faster. There would be approximately 20 more years of dirt racing before paved oval racing would finally become the expected norm for NASCAR racing.

== Schedule ==
1. Tri-City Speedway, High Point, North Carolina
2. Palm Beach Speedway, West Palm Beach, Florida
3. Speedway Park, Jacksonville, Florida
4. Daytona Beach & Road Course, Daytona Beach, Florida
5. Oglethorpe Speedway, Savannah, Georgia
6. Columbia Speedway, Cayce, South Carolina
7. Occoneechee Speedway, Hillsboro, North Carolina
8. North Wilkesboro Speedway, North Wilkesboro, North Carolina
9. Montgomery Speedway, Montgomery, Alabama
10. Langhorne Speedway, Langhorne, Pennsylvania
11. Charlotte Speedway, Charlotte, North Carolina
12. Hickory Motor Speedway, Hickory, North Carolina
13. Arizona State Fairgrounds, Phoenix, Arizona
14. Tucson Rodeo Grounds, Tucson, Arizona
15. Martinsville Speedway, Martinsville, Virginia
16. Richmond Raceway, Richmond, Virginia
17. Raleigh Speedway, Raleigh, North Carolina
18. Forsyth County Fairgrounds, Winston-Salem, North Carolina
19. Lincoln Speedway, New Oxford, Pennsylvania
20. Monroe County Fairgrounds, Rochester, New York
21. Fonda Speedway, Fonda, New York
22. Airborne Speedway, Plattsburgh, New York
23. Southern State Fairgrounds, Charlotte, North Carolina
24. Hub City Speedway, Spartanburg, South Carolina
25. Columbia Speedway, Cayce, South Carolina
26. Ashville-Weaverville Speedway, Weaverville, North Carolina
27. Morristown Speedway, Morristown, New Jersey
28. Altamont-Schenectady Fairgrounds, Altamont, New York
29. New York State Fair, Syracuse, New York
30. Bay Meadows Speedway, San Mateo, California
31. Southern State Fairgrounds, Charlotte, North Carolina
32. Forsyth County Fairgrounds, Winston-Salem, North Carolina
33. Memphis-Arkansas Speedway, LeHi, Arkansas
34. Raleigh Speedway, Raleigh, North Carolina
35. Darlington Raceway, Darlington, South Carolina
36. Montgomery Speedway, Montgomery, Alabama
37. Langhorne Speedway, Langhorne, Pennsylvania
38. TBD
39. Greenville-Pickens Speedway, Greenville, North Carolina
40. Memphis-Arkansas Speedway, LeHi, Arkansas
41. Columbia Speedway, Cayce, South Carolina
42. Martinsville Speedway, Martinsville, Virginia
43. Las Vegas Park Speedway, Las Vegas, Nevada
44. North Wilkesboro Speedway, North Wilkesboro, North Carolina
45. Occoneechee Speedway, Hillsboro, North Carolina

== Race summaries ==
=== Wilkes County 160 ===
The 1955 Wilkes County 160 was a NASCAR Grand National (now NASCAR Cup Series) race that took place on April 3, 1955, at North Wilkesboro Speedway in the American community of North Wilkesboro, North Carolina.

One hundred and sixty laps were done on a dirt track spanning .625 miles (1.006 km). The total duration of the race was one hour, twenty-two minutes, and three seconds with no cautions. Buck Baker defeated Dick Rathmann by three feet.

==== Top 10 Results ====
1. 87 - Buck Baker
2. 3 - Dick Rathmann
3. 99 - Curtis Turner
4. 42 - Lee Petty
5. 28 - Eddie Skinner
6. 98 - Dave Terrell
7. 5 - Jimmie Lewallen
8. 460 - Gene Simpson
9. 88 - Joel Million
10. 59 - Blackie Pitt

=== 1955-04 ===
The fourth race of the 1955 season was run on February 27 at the Daytona Beach Road Course in Daytona Beach, Florida. Tim Flock won the pole.

==== Top 10 Results ====
1. 300- Tim Flock
2. 42- Lee Petty
3. 24- Ray Duhigg
4. 99- Curtis Turner
5. 14- Fonty Flock
6. 82- Joe Eubanks
7. 47- Dick Joslin
8. 63- Bill Tanner
9. 87- Buck Baker
10. 185- Jack Radtke

=== 1955-15 ===
This race took place at Martinsville Speedway in Martinsville, Virginia, on May 15, 1955. Jim Paschal won the pole position at the speed of 58.823 miles per hour but Tim Flock won the race with one other vehicle on the lead lap (Lee Petty). Eleven thousand people attended the one-hour-and-fifty-four-minute race. The average speed of the race was 52.554 miles per hour.

==== Top 10 Results ====
1. 300- Tim Flock
2. 42- Lee Petty
3. 55- Junior Johnson
4. 88- Jimmie Lewallen
5. 44- Bob Welborn
6. 87- Buck Baker
7. 121- Harvey Henderson
8. 28- Eddie Skinner
9. 78- Jim Paschal
10. 71- Fred Dove

=== Richmond 200 ===
The 1955 Richmond 200 was a NASCAR Grand National (now Monster Energy NASCAR Cup Series) race that took place on May 22, 1955, at Richmond Fairgrounds (now Richmond International Raceway) in the American community of Richmond, Virginia. Two hundred laps took place on a dirt track spanning 0.500 miles (0.805 km). The exact time of the race was one hour, fifty minutes, and thirty seconds.

Qualifying was rained out so they had to draw for the pole position.

==== Top 10 Results ====
1. 300 - Tim Flock
2. 301 - Fonty Flock
3. 42 - Lee Petty
4. 78 - Jim Paschal
5. 55 - Junior Johnson
6. 44 - Bob Welborn
7. 460 - Gene Simpson
8. 53 - Elmo Langley
9. 69 - Volney Schulze
10. 11 - George Parrish

=== 1955 Mid-South 250 ===
The 1955 Mid-South 250 is a NASCAR Grand National race that took place on August 14, 1955, at the Memphis-Arkansas Speedway in LeHi, Arkansas. Fifteen thousand people attended this race.

==== Top 10 Results ====
1. 301- Fonty Flock
2. 87- Speedy Thompson
3. 300- Tim Flock
4. 78- Jim Paschal
5. 89- Buck Baker
6. 44- Bob Welborn
7. 55- Junior Johnson
8. 14- Slick Smith
9. 3- Jimmy Ayers
10. 23- Ken Johns

=== Southern 500 ===
The 1955 Southern 500 took place on September 5 at the Darlington Raceway in Darlington, South Carolina. Herb Thomas won that race while Fireball Roberts started out at the pole position. This race can be seen on DVDs showing classic stock cars of the 1950s and the 1960s. As one of the major stock cars race to take place prior to the 1959 Daytona 500, it was considered to be an honor to qualify for this race. Many locals would enter this race as an annual tradition and have their mechanics work on their cars for a month just for this race.

==== Top 10 Results ====
1. 92- Herb Thomas
2. 7- Jim Reed
3. 16- Tim Flock
4. 2- Gwyn Staley
5. 96- Larry Flynn
6. 89- Buck Baker
7. 93- Lou Spears
8. 70- Cotton Owens
9. 25- Bill Widenhouse
10. 04- Jimmy Massey

=== 1955-42 ===
This race took place at Martinsville Speedway in Martinsville, Virginia, on October 16, 1955. Speedy Thompson won the race but Gwyn Staley won the pole position by virtue of a drawing. The duration of the race was one hour and forty minutes.

==== Top 10 Results ====
1. 30- Speedy Thompson
2. 49- Bob Welborn
3. 44- Jim Paschal
4. 92- Herb Thomas
5. 7- Jim Reed
6. 9- Joe Weatherly
7. 2- Gwyn Staley
8. 42- Lee Petty
9. 04- Jimmy Massey
10. 87- Buck Baker

=== 1955 LeHi 300 ===
The 1955 LeHi 300 (known officially in NASCAR as 1955-40) was a NASCAR Grand National Series racing event that took place on October 9, 1955, at Memphis-Arkansas Speedway in the American community of LeHi, Arkansas.

NASCAR Cup Series beginners in this race included Johnny Allen, Bill Morton, Jim Murray, Norm Nelson, and Chuck Stevenson. A lot of drivers would make their grand exits from NASCAR after this race: this relatively long list included Floyd Curtis, Hooker Hood, Roscoe Rann and Leland Sewell. One-time race car drivers Bob Coleman, Al Hager, and Gene Rose would make their only NASCAR appearances during this race.

==== Top 10 Results ====
1. 297-Speedy Thompson
2. 98-Marvin Panch
3. 04-Jimmy Massey
4. 300-Tim Flock
5. 308-Bob Flock
6. 87-Buck Baker
7. 88-Jimmie Lewallen
8. 44-Ralph Liguori
9. B29-Dink Widenhouse
10. 49-Bob Welborn

=== 1955 Wilkes 160 ===
The 1955 Wilkes 160 is a NASCAR Grand National race that took place on October 23, 1955, at the North Wilkesboro Speedway in North Wilkesboro, North Carolina. Buck Baker defeated Lee Petty by a time of three seconds. This race would produce Joe Weatherly's first finish in the top five.

==== Top 10 Results ====
1. 87- Buck Baker
2. 42- Lee Petty
3. 2- Gwyn Staley
4. 9- Joe Weatherly
5. 300- Tim Flock
6. 301- Fonty Flock
7. 20- Speedy Thompson
8. B-29- Dink Widenhouse
9. 198- Dave Terrell
10. 44- Jim Paschal

=== 1955-45 ===
This race took place at Orange Speedway in Hillsboro, North Carolina, on October 16, 1955. Tim Flock both won the pole position at the speed of 81.673 miles per hour and won the race with five other vehicles on the lead lap. Six thousand people attended the one-hour-and-sixteen-minute race. The pole speed was recorded as 81.673 miles per hour while the average speed was 70.465 miles per hour.

==== Top 10 Results ====
1. 301 - Tim Flock
2. 99 - Curtis Turner
3. 87 - Buck Baker
4. 92 - Herb Thomas
5. 198 - Dave Terrell
6. 9 - Joe Weatherly
7. B-29 - Dink Widenhouse
8. 2 - Gwyn Staley
9. 04 - Jimmy Massey
10. 44 - Bob Welborn

=== 1955-01 ===
This 200 lap race took place at Tri-City Speedway on November 7, 1955 with Lee Petty taking the win.

== Season standings ==
=== Points ===
1. Tim Flock - 9596
2. Buck Baker - 8088
3. Lee Petty - 7194
4. Bob Welborn - 5460
5. Herb Thomas - 5186
6. Junior Johnson - 4810
7. Eddie Skinner - 4652
8. Jim Paschal - 4572
9. Jimmie Lewallen - 4526
10. Gwyn Staley - 4360
11. Fonty Flock - 4266
12. Dave Terrell - 3170
13. Jimmy Massey - 2924
14. Marvin Panch - 2812
15. Speedy Thompson - 2452
16. Jim Reed - 2416
17. Gene Simpson - 2388
18. Dick Rathmann - 2298
19. Ralph Liguori - 2124
20. Joe Eubanks - 2028
21. Blackie Pitt - 1992
22. Harvey Henderson - 1930
23. Banks Simpson - 1852
24. Dink Widenhouse - 1752
25. John Dodd Jr. - 1496
26. Bill Widenhouse - 1444
27. Lou Spears - 1272
28. Larry Flynn - 1260
29. Cotton Owens - 1248
30. Gordon Smith - 1212
31. Billy Carden - 1172
32. Arden Mounts - 1170
33. Joe Million - 1136
34. Curtis Turner - 1120
35. John Lindsay - 1052
36. Nace Mattingly - 992
37. Bill Blair - 974
38. Donald Thomas - 932
39. Ed Cole - 924
40. Mack Hanbury - 900
41. Danny Letner - 892
42. George Parish - 880
43. Banjo Matthews - 860
44. Carl Krueger - 748
45. Ted Cannaday - 744
46. Allen Adkins - 740
47. Joe Weatherly - 724
48. John McVitty - 684
49. Lloyd Dane - 674
50. Fred Dove - 668

=== Wins ===
1. Tim Flock - 18
2. Lee Petty - 6
3. Junior Johnson - 5
4. Buck Baker - 3
5. Herb Thomas - 3
6. Jim Paschal - 3
7. Fonty Flock - 3
8. Speedy Thompson - 2
9. Danny Letner - 1
10. all others at 0 wins

=== Top 5 Finishes ===
1. Tim Flock - 32
2. Buck Baker - 24
3. Lee Petty - 20
4. Herb Thomas - 14
5. Bob Welborn - 12
6. Junior Johnson - 12
7. Jim Paschal - 12
8. Jimmie Lewallen - 8
9. Gwyn Staley - 7
10. Dick Rathmann - 7
11. Eddie Skinner - 4
12. Jimmy Massey - 4
13. Marvin Panch - 4
14. Jim Reed - 4
15. Curtis Turner - 4
16. Dave Terrell - 3
17. Speedy Thompson - 3
18. Don White - 3
19. Billy Carden - 2
20. Joe Million - 2
21. Donald Thomas - 2
22. Danny Letner - 2
23. Allen Adkins - 2
24. Gober Sosebee - 2
25. Bill Amack - 2
26. Fred Dove - 2
27. Gene Simpson - 1
28. Harvey Henderson - 1
29. John Dodd Jr. - 1
30. Bill Widenhouse - 1
31. Larry Flynn - 1
32. Cotton Owens - 1
33. Nace Mattingly - 1
34. Carl Krueger - 1
35. Joe Weatherly - 1
36. Lloyd Dane - 1
37. Ray Duhigg - 1
38. Bill Hyde - 1
39. Bob Flock - 1
40. John Kieper - 1
41. Jack Choquette - 1
42. Bill West - 1
43. Norm Nelson - 1
44. Clyde Palmer - 1
45. all others at 0 top five finishes

== See also ==
- 1955 NASCAR Pacific Coast Late Model Division
