= Eddie Skinner =

American racing driver (1908–1987)

- Born: August 19, 1908; Hampton, Virginia, U.S.
- Died: March 1, 1987 (aged 78); Reno, Nevada, U.S.

NASCAR Cup Series career
- 73 races run over 6 years
- Best finish: 7th (1955)
- First race: 1953 Race No. 11 (Martinsville)
- Last race: 1958 Race No. 13 (Old Dominion)
Wins	Top tens	Poles
0	17	0

Frank Edward Skinner (August 19, 1908 – March 1, 1987) was an American stock car racing racing driver. He competed in the NASCAR Grand National Series during the 1950s.

== Career ==
Skinner raced out of Yerington, Nevada, where he lived for 35 years. He made his debut in NASCAR competition at Martinsville Speedway in May 1953. Over the next six years, he competed in a total of 73 races, with his final start coming at Old Dominion Speedway in April 1958; his best finish was fifth, four times.

Skinner also competed in United States Auto Club stock car events. He was known as a prankster; in a race at Nashville Speedway in 1959, he was reported to have made a pit stop during the race, stating that his car needed to be "slowed down before someone gets hurt", while another report places the incident as taking place during a NASCAR event at Martinsville.

Long after his NASCAR racing days were behind him, Skinner raced stock cars at T-Car Speedway in Carson City, Nevada, competing as late as the mid-1980s, when he was well into his 70s.
