= Lou Spears =

American racing driver

- Born: Ardmore, Pennsylvania, U.S.

NASCAR Cup Series career
- 9 races run over 3 years
- Best finish: 27th - 1955 NASCAR Grand National season
- First race: 1955 (Morristown Speedway)
- Last race: 1957 (Old Bridge Stadium)
Wins	Top tens	Poles
0	1	0

Lou Spears (birth year unknown) is an American retired NASCAR Grand National driver from Ardmore, Pennsylvania, US. He competed in a two-year career that spanned from 1955 to 1957. Spears scored one position in the top-ten and finished the race in 20th place on average. His average starts were in 31st place and spent 1,415.6 miles (2,278.2 km) in a stock car.
