= Bill Widenhouse =

American racing driver (1929–1995)

- Born: June 17, 1929; Midland, North Carolina, U.S.
- Died: June 29, 1995 (aged 66)
- Achievements: 1955 NASCAR Modified Champion

NASCAR Cup Series career
- 31 races run over 9 years
- Best finish: 26th – 1955 Grand National season
- First race: 1950 Southern 500 (Darlington Raceway)
- Last race: 1964 Textile 250 (Concord Speedway)
Wins	Top tens	Poles
0	5	0

Bill Widenhouse (June 17, 1929 – June 29, 1995) was an American NASCAR Grand National driver from Midland, North Carolina, USA. He was the 1955 NASCAR Modified Champion.

== Career ==
During his 14-year NASCAR career, Widenhouse managed to earn two top-five finishes, five top-ten finishes, completed 4131 laps for 4,129.0 miles (6,645.0 km), and earned $3,275 in take-home pay ($33,997.45 when considering inflation). Widenhouse's average starting position was 22nd and his average finish position was 21st. He was a competitor at the 1955 Southern 500 and received a ninth-place finish as the result of the race.

Widenhouse's best finishes were on tri-oval intermediate tracks where he would finish in 18th place on average. His worst finishes would come on road courses with an average finish of 48th place.
