= Blackie Pitt =

American racing driver (1925–1992)

- Pitt next to one of his cars
- Born: William H. Pitt; March 8, 1925; Rocky Mount, North Carolina, U.S.
- Died: March 28, 1992 (aged 67)
- Cause of death: Cancer
- Awards: 1954 Grand National Series Rookie of the Year

NASCAR Cup Series career
- 81 races run over 4 years
- Best finish: 11th (1954)
- First race: 1954 Wilkes County 160 (North Wilkesboro)
- Last race: 1958 Race #14 (Old Bridge)
Wins	Top tens	Poles
0	19	0
- Statistics up to date as of April 22, 2013.

William H. "Blackie" Pitt (March 18, 1925 – March 28, 1992) was an American NASCAR Grand National Series racer born in the American town of Rocky Mount, North Carolina. He is best known as the 1954 NASCAR Rookie of the Year.

== Career ==
Pitt raced from 1954 to 1958 and competed in 81 races in his four-year NASCAR career. One of his most memorable appearances in NASCAR was at the 1955 Southern 500; where he would race in a 1955 Ford Fairlane owned by his brother W.W. "Brownie" Pitt. This race would be captured on film and memorialized for future generations. His total career in NASCAR consisted of completing 9326 laps of professional American stock car racing. According to history, Pitt generally did better on short tracks than he did on road courses and intermediate tracks.

Pitt would end up contributing nineteen finishes in the top ten and accumulating 6,222.1 miles or 10,013.5 kilometres of stock car racing experience. His total career earnings is considered to be $5,619 ($62,703.37 when adjusted for inflation). Pitt was the recipient of the 1954 NASCAR Rookie of the Year award although he never received an official trophy. Due to the sudden disqualification of Joe Weatherly and Jim Reed at the end of an untitled 1955 Palm Beach Speedway race in West Palm Beach, Florida, Pitt was awarded an additional $50 ($600.93 when adjusted for inflation). The money came from a Mrs. Gail John Bruner using her Wachovia Bank and Trust Company bank account to access the funds.

Pitt's ultimate retirement came after finishing in last place at a 1958 race at Old Bridge Stadium that had a 27-driver grid that included Elmo Langley, Lee Petty, and Junior Johnson.
