= Dink Widenhouse =

American NASCAR driver (1932–2024)

- Born: David Widenhouse; January 1, 1932; Concord, North Carolina, U.S.
- Died: August 19, 2024 (aged 92)

NASCAR Cup Series career
- 28 races run over 3 years
- Best finish: 24th (1955)
- First race: 1954 untitled race (Hickory)
- Last race: 1956 Southern 500 (Darlington)
Wins	Top tens	Poles
0	11	1

David "Dink" Widenhouse (January 1, 1932 – August 19, 2024) was an American NASCAR Grand National Series driver.

== Life and career ==
Widenhouse began racing at the age of fifteen when his brother built a dirt track near Concord, NC. Dink's first car was a '37 Ford Coach with what would become his trademark "B-29" emblem on the side.

From the age of 22 to the age of 24, Widenhouse competed in 2,101.9 miles (3,382.7 km) and 3,097 laps of racing. While he never won a race, he managed to gain a pole position at the 1955 running of the Wilkes County 160 (now the First Union 400) finishing 19th in that race. Widenhouse had a successful racing career at the Charlotte fairgrounds, Midland, Concord, Myrtle Beach and Columbia, SC and Danville Virginia. Part of his success stemmed from his great mechanic "Greaseball Young". His racing career came to an end in the 1960s when paved tracks became the norm. Widenhouse always preferred dirt and did not like racing on pavement. During his racing career, he won nearly 200 races, with his record including 21 wins in one season. He was known as "the Preacher" because he never raced on Sunday.

Widenhouse's career earnings were US$3,225 ($38,190.79 when adjusted for inflation). His only last place finish came at an untitled 1955 race at Southern State Fairgrounds in Charlotte, North Carolina.

Widenhouse died on August 19, 2024, at the age of 92.

== Sources ==
- Dink Widenhouse career summary at DriverDB.com
- Dink Widenhouse driver statistics at Racing-Reference
- 1955 Untitled Race at Southern State Fairgrounds Information
- Dink Widenhouse Papers, J Murrey Atkins Library, UNC Charlotte
- Oral History Interview with Dink Widenhouse
