= Johnny Allen (racing driver) =

Racecar driver

- Born: September 17, 1934 (age 92); Greenville, South Carolina, U.S.

NASCAR Cup Series career
- 173 races run over 13 years
- Best finish: 7th (1957)
- First race: 1955 LeHi 300, race #2 (Memphis-Arkansas Speedway)
- Last race: 1967 Carolina 500 (North Carolina Speedway)
- First win: 1962 Myers Brothers 200 (Bowman-Gray Stadium)
Wins	Top tens	Poles
1	61	3

Johnny Allen (born September 17, 1934, in Greenville, South Carolina) is an American NASCAR Grand National Series driver from 1955 to 1967. He won one race in his career, the 1962 Myers Brothers 200 at the Bowman-Gray Stadium on June 16, 1962. Allen filled in for Jack Smith in the 1961 Volunteer 500 at Bristol Motor Speedway and won the race, but the win was credited to Smith because Smith had started the race. He scored 19 career top-five and 61 top-ten finishes.
