= Gwyn Staley =

American racing driver (1927–1958)

- Born: Gwyn Edward Staley; July 6, 1927; Burlington, North Carolina, U.S.
- Died: March 23, 1958 (aged 30); Richmond, Virginia, U.S.
- Cause of death: Injuries from racing accident

NASCAR Cup Series career
- 69 races run over 8 years
- Best finish: 10th – 1955 Grand National season
- First race: 1951 Southern 500 (Darlington)
- Last race: 1958 untitled race (Champion)
- First win: 1957 untitled race (Coastal)
- Last win: 1957 untitled race (Langhorne)
Wins	Top tens	Poles
3	41	2

Gwyn Edward Staley (July 6, 1927 – March 23, 1958) was an American NASCAR Grand National driver from Burlington, North Carolina.

== Career ==
As a Grand National driver, Staley had three wins in addition to twenty-three finishes in the "top-five" and forty-one finishes in the "top-ten." Out of 10218 laps, he officially led 299 laps and accumulated a grand total of $23,284 ($259,830.1 when adjusted for inflation) in his seven-year career. Notable appearances for Staley have been at Hickory Motor Speedway (where he won the first race ever held there) and Langhorne Speedway (where he won a race in 1957 using a Chevrolet Bel Air vehicle).

Staley won three races driving the Julian-Petty-prepared 1957 Chevy Bel Air. The first win was on August 26, 1957 at the Coastal Speedway in Myrtle Beach, South Carolina. It was a 200-lap race and he had lapped the field. The second win came a few weeks later on September the 5th. It was at the New York State Fairgrounds and once again he had lapped the field driving the Petty prepared 1957 Chevy. His third and last win came on September the 15th in the same car at the Langhorne Speedway in Pennsylvania. He had the field lapped twice this time. North Wilkesboro Speedway named the race after him during the early 1970s.

Staley's greatest successes came at road courses where his average finishes would be in ninth place. His racing performance would be the worst on intermediate tracks where he would finish in a paltry 39th place.

Eight days after scoring a second-place finish in the 150-lap Grand National race at Champion Speedway in Fayetteville, North Carolina, Staley was killed in a NASCAR Convertible Division where his car rolled over three times before crashing into a fence in a 100-mile race held at the Atlantic Rural Fairgrounds in Richmond, Virginia in March 1958.
