= Ralph Liguori =

American racing driver (1926–2020)

- Born: Ralph Carmine Liguori; October 10, 1926 New York, New York, U.S.
- Died: July 21, 2020 (aged 93) Tampa, Florida, U.S.

Champ Car career
- 61 races run over 15 years
- Years active: 1957–1971
- Best finish: 25th – 1958
- First race: 1957 Langhorne 100 (Langhorne)
- Last race: 1970 Golden State 100 (Sacramento)
Wins	Podiums	Poles
0	1	0

NASCAR Cup Series career
- 76 races run over 6 years
- Best finish: 10th (1954)
- First race: 1951 Race 16 (Pittsburgh)
- Last race: 1956 Race 53 (Shelby)
Wins	Top tens	Poles
0	30	0

Formula One World Championship career
- Active years: 1959
- Team(s): Maserati, Kurtis Kraft
- Entries: 1 (No starts)
- Championships: 0
- Wins: 0
- Podiums: 0
- Career points: 0
- Pole positions: 0
- Fastest laps: 0
- First entry: 1959 Indianapolis 500
- Last entry: 1959 Indianapolis 500

Ralph Carmine Liguori (October 10, 1926 – July 21, 2020) was an American racing driver from New York City.

== Indycar career ==
Liguori competed in the USAC Championship Car series from 1957 to 1971 making 61 starts. In what would be his penultimate Championship Car race, Liguori's best finish was second in the 1970 Hoosier Hundred. 1966 was his most active year when he made seven starts and finished 28th in the National Championship. He attempted the Indianapolis 500 six times (1959, 1962, 1963, 1964, 1967, and 1968) but he failed to make the field each time. Liguori continued racing well into his seventies and won a minor race in 2000 at 73 years old.

== NASCAR career ==
Liguori competed in 76 NASCAR Grand National Series races in his career. He had 30 top-ten and five top-five finishes in his career. His best finish was a third-place finish at Wilson Speedway in Wilson, North Carolina. He finished tenth in the 1954 season points. Liguori made one start in the NASCAR Convertible Series during 1956.

== Racing record ==
=== Complete Formula One results ===
Year	Entrant	Chassis	Engine	1	2	3	4	5	6	7	8	9	WDC	Points
1959	Eldorado Italia	Maserati 420M/58	Maserati 4.2 V8	MON	500; DNQ	NED	FRA	GBR	GER	POR	ITA	USA	NC	0
1959	Chapman S. Root	Kurtis Kraft 500G	Offenhauser 4.5 L4		500; DNQ								NC	0
