= Carl Kiekhaefer =

NASCAR team owner (1906–1983)

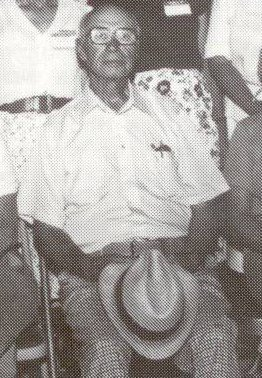
- Born: June 4, 1906; Mequon, Wisconsin, U.S.
- Died: October 5, 1983 (aged 77); Fond du Lac, Wisconsin, U.S.
- Employer: Kiekhaefer Marine

- Series: NASCAR Grand National Series
- Race drivers: Buck Baker; Bob Flock; Fonty Flock; Tim Flock; Speedy Thompson; Herb Thomas
- Manufacturer: Chrysler
- Opened: 1955
- Closed: 1956

Career
- Drivers' Championships: 2 (1955 and 1956)
- Race victories: 52 (including 16 straight)

Elmer Carl Kiekhaefer (June 4, 1906 – October 5, 1983) was the founder of Kiekhaefer Mercury (later Mercury Marine) and Kiekhaefer Aeromarine and also a two-time NASCAR championship car owner.

== Kiekhaefer Mercury founder ==
Kiekhaefer was born on June 4, 1906, in Mequon, Wisconsin, to Arnold and Clara Wessel Kiekhaefer. After graduating from Cedarburg High School, Kiekhaefer spent one year attending the Milwaukee School of Engineering and later took extension courses from the University of Wisconsin that prepared him for a career in electrical engineering.

In 1927, Kiekhaefer briefly worked as a draftsman for Evinrude Motors before being fired for "...frequent, disquieting and brazenly insubordinate arguments concerning design and product development...".

Kiekhaefer was a young engineer right out of college when he received his first of his over 200 patents. He purchased an outboard motor manufacturing company in Cedarburg, Wisconsin in 1939, intending to make magnetic separators for the area's dairy industry. The company had 300 defective motors, which he rebuilt and sold to catalog company Montgomery Ward. Orders kept coming for the motors, and Kiekhaefer Corporation was born.

== World War II ==
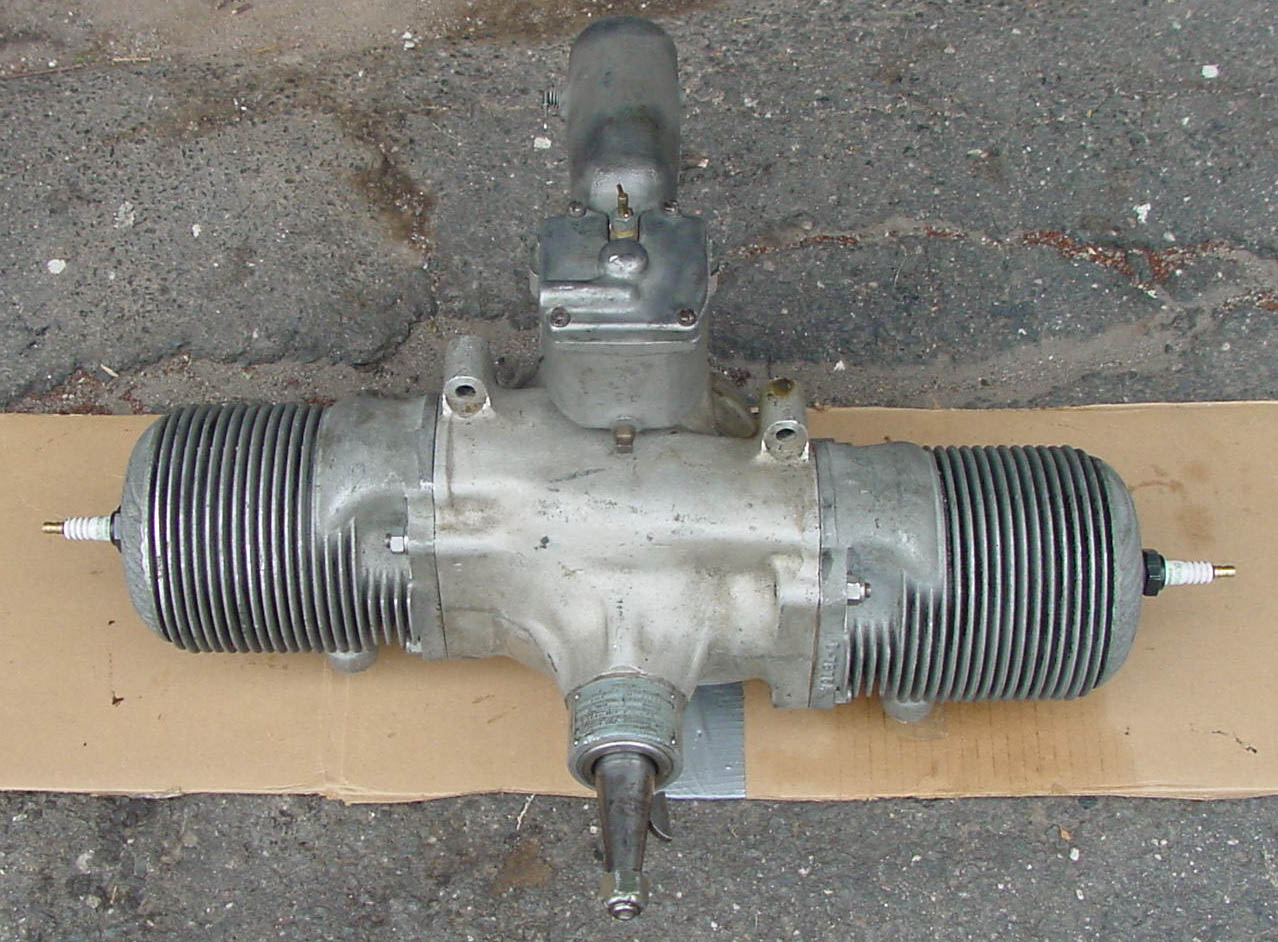
A Kiekhaefer drone motor

During World War II, the Kiekhaefer corporation manufactured small two-cylinder drone engines that were used for target aircraft.

== Boating pioneer ==
In 1957, Kiekhaefer introduced the Mark 75 motor, the industry's first 6-cylinder 60 hp (horsepower) outboard motor. Two Mark 75 motors set an endurance record by running for 34 days, 11 hours, 47 minutes, and 5.4 seconds nonstop and over 25,000 miles. The motors were refueled on the run, and averaged 30.3 (miles per hour). In 1961, Kiekhaefer Marine merged with the Brunswick Corporation. Later that year Kiekhaefer used his boat engineering and NASCAR skills to develop the 100 hp stern drive engine now known as MerCruiser. When Kiekhaefer resigned as president of the company in 1969, the company name changed to Mercury Marine.

In 1970, Kiekhaefer founded Kiekhaefer Aeromarine Motors, building racing engines. After Carl's death in 1983, his son Fred secured control of the company and changed its focus from the engine business to propulsion hardware. In 1990, Kiekhaefer Aeromarine was sold to the Brunswick Corporation.

== NASCAR owner ==
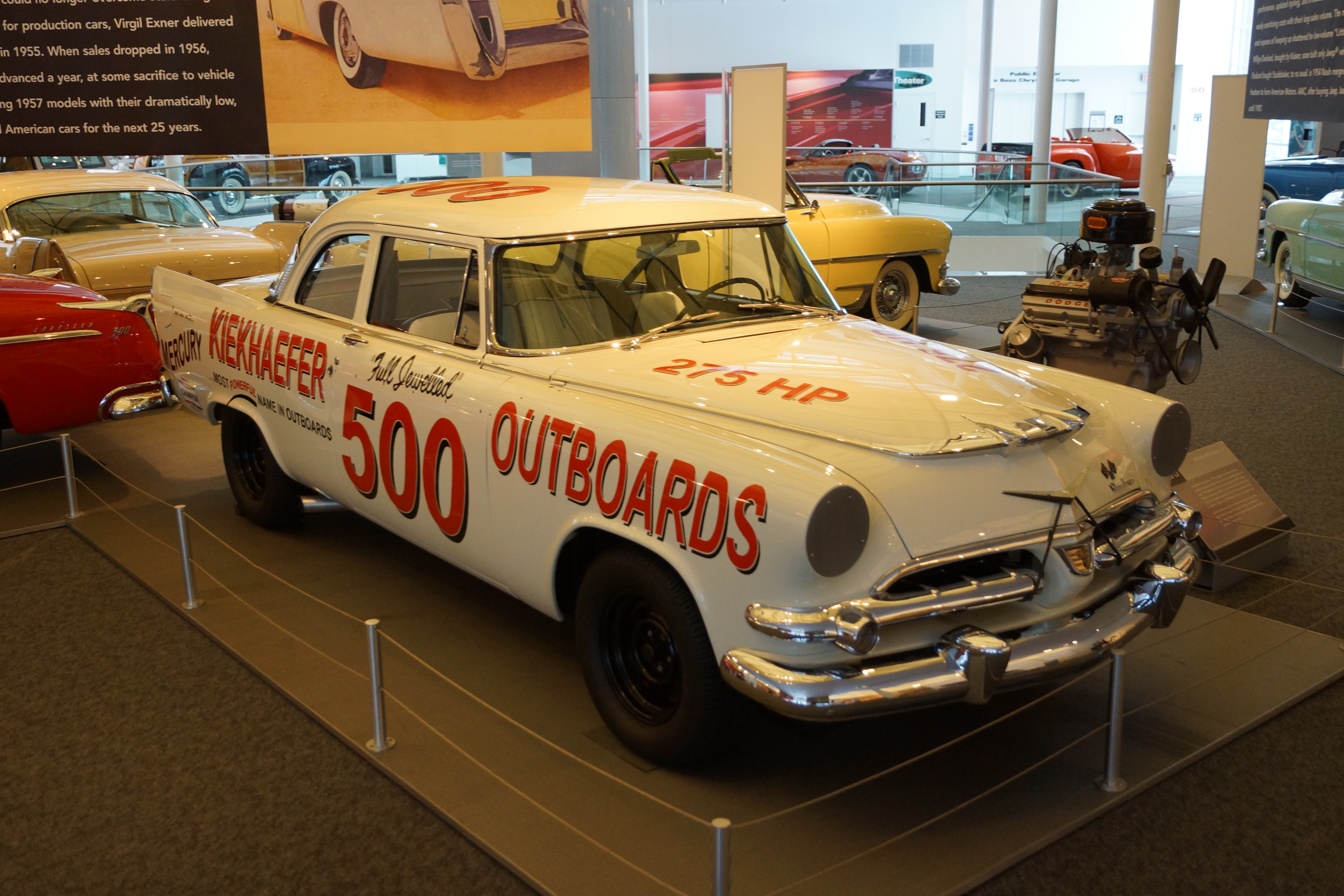
1956 Dodge Coronet D-500 Kiekhaefer Race Team

Kiekhaefer became involved in car racing to promote his now profitable boat motor company. He entered 1954 Chrysler New Yorker Club Coupes in the AAA Milwaukee Mile and won all three races entered. Tony Bettenhausen and Frank Mundy drove. He then purchased large and powerful Chrysler 300s to use in NASCAR for the 1955 season. Because Kiekhaefer was a millionaire, he could afford the expensive cars, unlike the other teams. He bought the best equipment and had a team, as well as transporters, unheard of in NASCAR at the time.

Kiekhaefer brought his car with no driver to the first race at the Daytona Beach Road Course. Former champion Tim Flock had retired after the 1954 season, but was convinced to return by Kiekhaefer for $40,000 ($473,684 in 2025 dollars).

=== 1955 ===
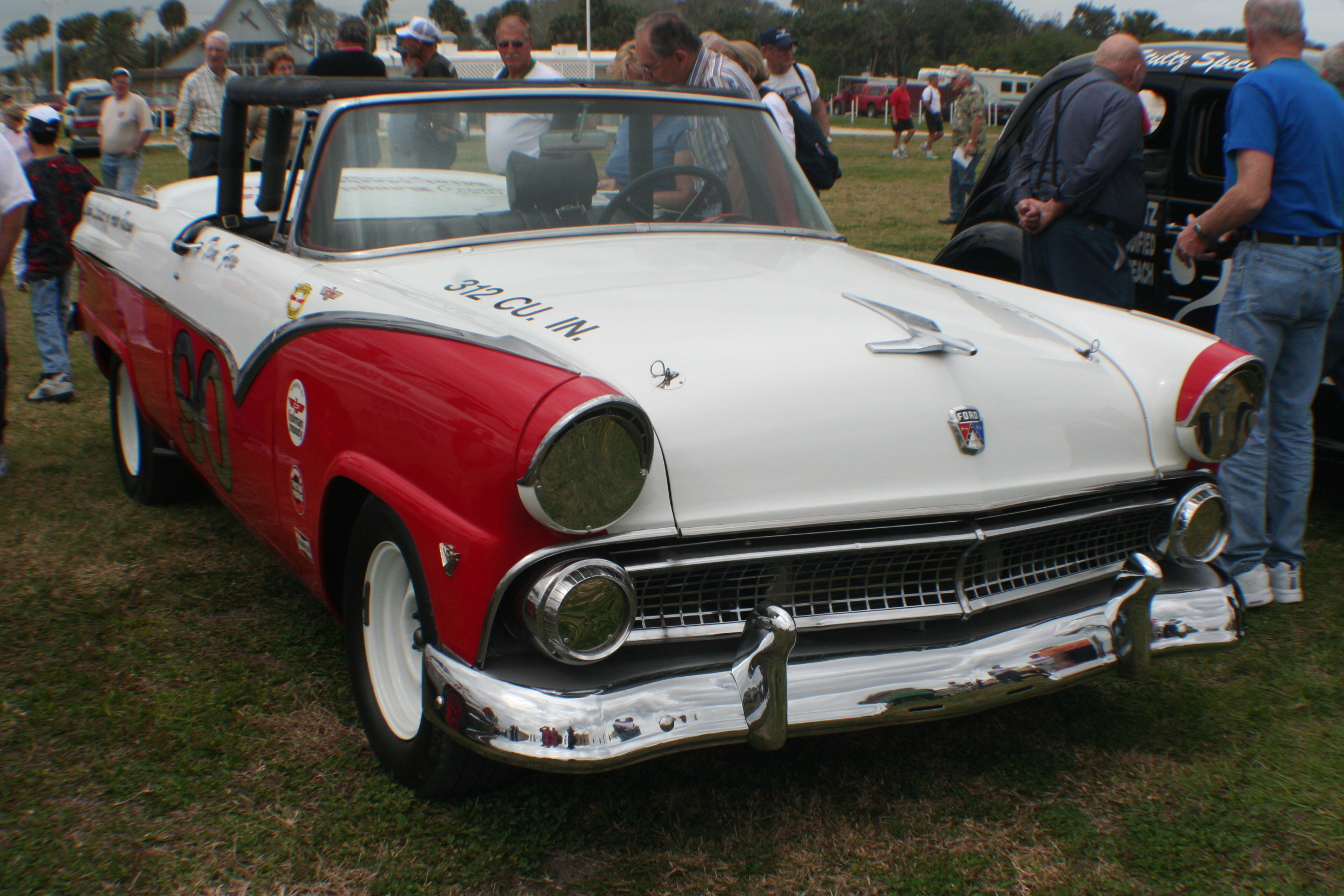
1955 Tim Flock racing car

Kiekhaefer had six drivers race for him during the 45-event season. The drivers had a combined 22 wins, 47 top-tens, and 23 poles in their 64 races.

Tim Flock was the number one driver, entering 38 events, with 18 wins, 18 poles, and 32 top-ten finishes on his way to the NASCAR championship. Kiekhaefer and Flock had a falling out early in the 1956 season.

=== 1956 ===
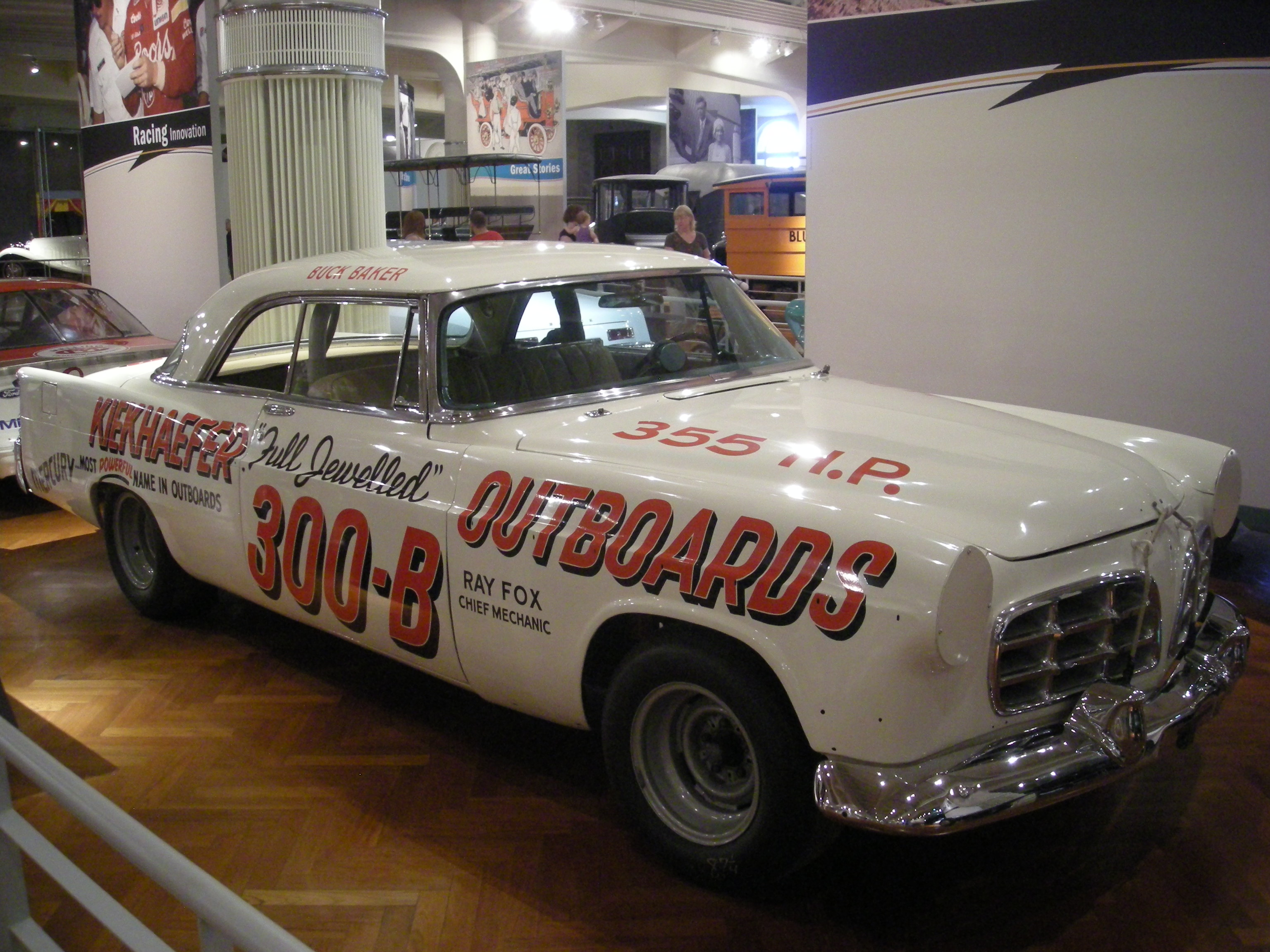
Baker's 1956 Chrysler 300-B

Kiekhaefer had nine drivers race for him in the 56 event season, taking first, second, third, and ninth in the final series points. The drivers combined for 30 wins, 25 poles, and 92 top-ten finishes in their 126 races. Four drivers combined for 16 straight team wins between March 25 and June 3.

Buck Baker was number one driver for the team. Baker entered 44 events, with 14 wins, 12 poles, and 35 top-ten finishes on his way to the team's second consecutive championship.

Speedy Thompson also drove for the team, entering 39 events, with eight wins, seven poles, and 28 top-ten finishes on his way to third place in the points.

=== 1957 ===
Kiekhaefer quit NASCAR in January 1957 after battling Bill France over accusations of cheating by the other competitors. NASCAR changed the rules to Kiekhaefer's disadvantage and he did not want a backlash to affect Mercury sales after fans booed the team.

Kiekhaefer then purchased four 1957 Chrysler 300Cs with the intent of entering the road race segment of NASCAR which only existed in 1956 and early 1957. The first "Road America competition model" he purchased (a white 300C hardtop) was resold without modification. A red car received experimental changes, and two further cars began preparation for the June race scheduled for the Road America, Elkhart Lake, Wisconsin, near Mercury Marine's home plant in Fond du Lac. The race and the series were canceled. The two cars, a black 300C hardtop and a special order charcoal gray 300C hardtop were reinstated for street use and became Carl's personal car and later that of his chief engineer, Charles Strang.

=== Other highlights ===
- The team was the first to use dry paper air filters, which are now standard equipment in cars.
- Set a record lap of 140 mph at the Daytona Beach Road Course.
- First major national sponsor to NASCAR (excluding automotive-related companies) in Mercury outboard motors.
- First to do scientific testing of the oil in his race car motors to determine how contamination affected performance.
- First professional team. The cars were professionally painted and detailed. Team members wore uniforms. At a time when most drivers drove their cars to the track, Kiekhaefer used the Mercury Marine box or "van" style trucks with the race cars sticking out the back because of their length. The floors of the trucks had jacks built into them to support the cars on their frames so they would not ride on their wheel and axle bearings during transport to and from races.
- While not the first "superteam" in NASCAR history, the Mercury Marine team was legendary. The team raced five cars at most events during the 1956 season, and even fielded six cars at the 1956 Daytona Beach Road Course race.

== Road racing ==
Kiekhaefer participated in the 1952 and 1953 Carrera Panamericana. In 1952, he entered Chrysler Saratogas with the hemi V8 in that light body. For 1953, the factory built Chrysler New Yorker Specials known as Pan Am models. Kiekhaefer entered four of these in the '53 race.

== Awards ==
- Kiekhaefer was inducted into the Motorsports Hall of Fame of America in 1998.
- Kiekhaefer received the National Marine Manufacturers Association Awards Gallery 1988 Hall of Fame Award (in the first class).
- Kiekhaefer was inducted into the National Motorsports Press Association Hall Of Fame in 1980.
- In 1976, Kiekhaefer received the 20th Annual Ole Evinrude Award for an "…immeasurable contribution to boating" from competitor Evinrude.
