= HomeTrust Park =

Baseball park in Asheville, North Carolina, U.S.

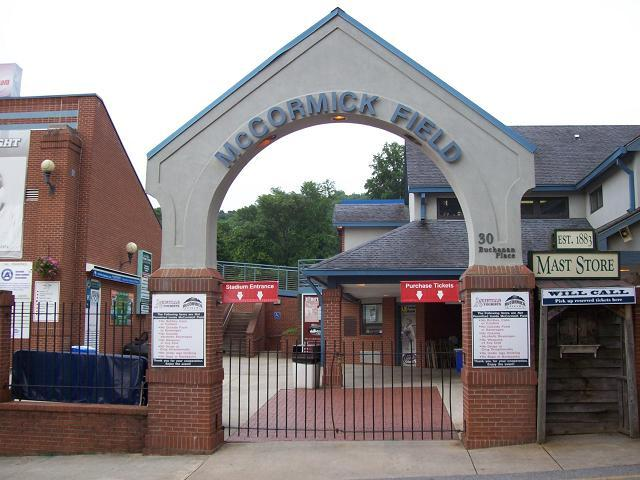

- Location within North Carolina Location within the United States
- Interactive map of HomeTrust Park
- Former names: Lewis McCormick Field (1924–2026)
- Address: 30 Buchanan Place; Asheville, North Carolina, 28801
- Coordinates: 35°35′14″N 82°32′57″W
- Owner: City of Asheville
- Operator: DeWine Seeds Silver Dollar Baseball, LLC.
- Capacity: 4,000
- Surface: Natural Grass
- Field size: Left Field: 326 ft (99 m); Left-Center: 370 ft (110 m); Center Field: 373 ft (114 m); Right-Center: 320 ft (98 m); Right Field: 297 ft (91 m)

Construction
- Groundbreaking: 1923
- Opened: April 3, 1924
- Renovated: 1959, 1992
- Cost: $200,000 ($3.76 million in 2025 dollars)
- Architects: Bowers, Ellis, and Watson
- General contractor: Leader Construction

Tenants
- Asheville Tourists (SAL) (1924–present); UNC Asheville Bulldogs (BSC); Big South Tournament (2009); Asheville Blues (NSL) (1940s)

HomeTrust Park (formerly Lewis McCormick Field) is a baseball stadium in Asheville, North Carolina. It is the home field of the Asheville Tourists team of Minor League Baseball. As befits the hilly city of Asheville, the ballpark sits on a section of level ground partway up one of the city's hills, providing a picturesque atmosphere. It is the third-oldest ballpark in Minor League Baseball.

== History ==
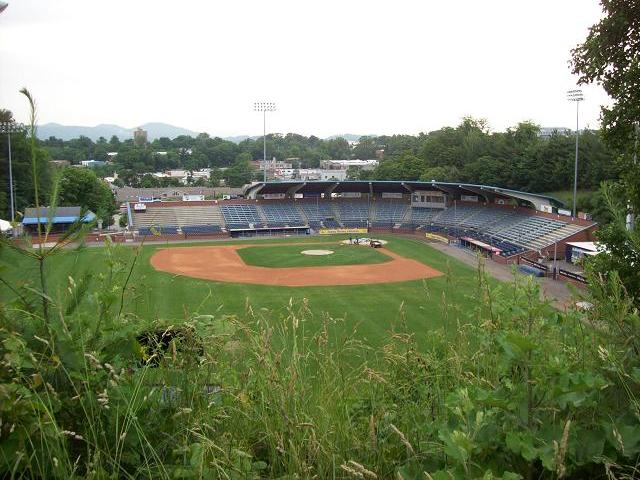

The ballpark was built in 1924 and was named after Asheville resident Lewis McCormick. Lights were installed for nighttime play prior to the 1930 season. Since then, it has been home to the various incarnations of the Asheville Tourists team, and also served as home field for the Asheville Blues of the Negro Southern League during the 1940s. In 1956, a quarter-mile racetrack was built around it, which held three NASCAR races (including a NASCAR Cup race in 1958) until the facility was renovated in 1959, and then rebuilt in concrete between the 1991 and 1992 seasons, replacing the largely wood structure which had developed a leaky roof. The 1992 ballpark kept a similar layout to the original McCormick Field. The facility included new expanded restrooms and larger concession stands. New clubhouses were built and lights erected as player and field enhancements. The height of the fence behind the cozy right field area, which was in the vicinity of just 300 feet (91 m) away from home plate, was more than tripled, as it now stands 36 feet (11 m) tall (nearly the same height as Fenway Park's "Green Monster").

It is one of the oldest Minor League Baseball stadiums still in regular use; as of the 2023 season, only Jackie Robinson Ballpark and LECOM Park, both in Florida, are older, dating to 1914 and 1923, respectively.

Between August 2024 and April 2026, McCormick Field underwent a $40 million renovation to meet modern baseball standards.

On April 14, 2026, the stadium was renamed to HomeTrust Park after locally based HomeTrust Bancshares bought the naming rights.

== Other uses ==
The ballpark served as one of the settings for the 1988 film Bull Durham.

The venue hosted the 2009 Big South Conference baseball tournament, won by Coastal Carolina.

Farther up the hill, behind the left field area, is Asheville Memorial Stadium, a football and soccer facility. Its bleacher seating structure is visible from McCormick Field. It was used as the Asheville High School football field until the current, on-campus field was constructed in 1980, as a practice field, in 82, as the main football field, with the addition of sufficient bleachers.

== See also ==
- List of NCAA Division I baseball venues
