= 1957 Southern 500 =

Auto race held at Darlington Raceway in 1957

Race details
- Race 40 of 53 in the 1957 NASCAR Grand National Series season
- 1957 Southern 500 program cover
- Date: September 2, 1957
- Location: Darlington Raceway, Darlington, South Carolina
- Course: Permanent racing facility
- Course length: 1.375 miles (2.213 km)
- Distance: 364 laps, 500.500 mi (805.477 km)
- Weather: Extremely hot with temperatures of 93.3 °F (34.1 °C); wind speeds of 8.9 miles per hour (14.3 km/h)
- Average speed: 100.094 miles per hour (161.086 km/h)
- Attendance: 75,000

Pole position
Driver	Cotton Owens	Nichels Engineering
- Time: 16.863 seconds

Most laps led
Driver	Speedy Thompson	Speedy Thompson
- Laps: 210

Winner
No. 46	Speedy Thompson	Speedy Thompson

Television in the United States
- Network: WJMX (local AM radio)
- Announcers: Local radio announcers

The 1957 Southern 500, the eighth running of the event, was a NASCAR Grand National Series event that was held on September 2, 1957, at Darlington Raceway in Darlington, South Carolina.

Herb Thomas, already a three-time Southern 500 winner, arrived in Darlington in a visibly shaken state. Thomas finally gave up his ride to Fonty Flock stating that he was just too nervous to drive the race. The race was then marred by a violent crash involving him, Bobby Myers and Paul Goldsmith, causing severe injuries to all drivers involved, ending Flock's career and resulting in the death of Myers.

== Background ==
Darlington Raceway, nicknamed by many NASCAR fans and drivers as "The Lady in Black" or "The Track Too Tough to Tame" and advertised as a "NASCAR Tradition", is a race track built for NASCAR racing located near Darlington, South Carolina. It is of a unique, somewhat egg-shaped design, an oval with the ends of very different configurations, a condition which supposedly arose from the proximity of one end of the track to a minnow pond the owner refused to relocate. This situation makes it very challenging for the crews to set up their cars' handling in a way that will be effective at both ends.

The track is a four-turn 1.366 miles (2.198 km) oval. The track's first two turns are banked at twenty-five degrees, while the final two turns are banked two degrees lower at twenty-three degrees. The front stretch (the location of the finish line) and the back stretch is banked at six degrees. Darlington Raceway can seat up to 60,000 people.

Darlington has something of a legendary quality among drivers and older fans; this is probably due to its long track length relative to other NASCAR speedways of its era and hence the first venue where many of them became cognizant of the truly high speeds that stock cars could achieve on a long track. The track allegedly earned the moniker The Lady in Black because the night before the race the track maintenance crew would cover the entire track with fresh asphalt sealant, in the early years of the speedway, thus making the racing surface dark black. Darlington is also known as "The Track Too Tough to Tame" because drivers can run lap after lap without a problem and then bounce off of the wall the following lap. Racers will frequently explain that they have to race the racetrack, not their competition. Drivers hitting the wall are considered to have received their "Darlington Stripe" thanks to the missing paint on the right side of the car.

== Race report ==
The event took five hours and one second to complete on a paved oval track spanning 1.375 miles (2.213 km) for a distance of 500.5 miles (805.5 km). Seventy-five thousand fans attended. Billy Carden qualified for this event in 45th place and finished in 6th place. The most notable crew chiefs for this race were Jess Potter, Bud Moore, Shorty Johns and Ray Fox.

Speedy Thompson defeated Cotton Owens by three laps at an average speed of 100.094 miles per hour (161.086 km/h). Thompson drove the iconic 1957 Chevrolet during that race; that vehicle went on to win the 1958 and the 1959 runnings of the Southern 500. Owens won the pole position with a speed of 117.416 miles per hour (188.963 km/h) during qualifying. Speedy Thompson would record his only Southern 500 victory here even though he would win on other paved superspeedways.

T.A. Toomes received the last-place finish due to a problem with his brakes on lap 3 out of 364. Runt Harris returned to NASCAR after a 7-year absence, driving his way to a 39th-place finish after his vehicle developed problems with its clutch. Former Cup series race winner Bill Blair made his only start of the 1957 NASCAR Grand National Series season; finishing in 38th place after inflicting terminal damage to his vehicle.

Brownie King was 59 laps down; he started in 31st and managed to improve his position to 21st place. However, he was unable to properly compete for a win or even a finish in the top-15.

Tragically, Bobby Myers lost his life as a result of a race-related crash on Lap 27, Fonty Flock spun on the backstretch (the current start-finish line), stopping perpendicular to the track, in turn three (near the current Turn One following 1997 changes). Paul Goldsmith and Myers both struck the stopped car at full speed.

Flock and Goldsmith both received serious injuries in the crash. Fonty Flock spun and slid to a stop on the backstretch. Myers slammed into him, immediately followed by Paul Goldsmith. The crash seriously injured Goldsmith, ended Flock's career, and killed Myers. He then flipped side over side and barrel-rolled. Myers died from his injuries. He is buried in Oaklawn Memorial Gardens in Winston-Salem, Forsyth County, North Carolina. The technology found in the modern NASCAR Cup Series vehicles could have saved Myers' life. The loss was viewed as a massive blow to the sport, with Myers being a promising star.

George Parrish made a notable appearance in this race using a 1956 Studebaker Golden Hawk; he witnessed the fatal crash of Bobby Myers at close range. Parrish retired after the 1958 NASCAR Cup Series season.

As a rookie, Cale Yarborough made his NASCAR debut here and finished in 42nd place (out of 50 drivers). Fonty Flock retired after this race.

=== Qualifying ===
Grid	No.	Driver	Manufacturer	Qualifying time	Speed	Owner
1	6	Cotton Owens	'57 Pontiac	16.863	117.416	Ray Nichels
2	4	Bobby Myers	'57 Oldsmobile	16.922	117.007	Petty Enterprises
3	31	Curtis Turner	'57 Ford	16.937	116.903	Smokey Yunick
4	80	Jimmie Lewallen	'57 Pontiac	17.211	115.042	Sam Rice
5	62	Frankie Schneider	'57 Chevrolet	17.228	114.929	Frankie Schenider
6	3	Paul Goldsmith	'57 Ford	16.598	119.291	Smokey Yunick
7	46	Speedy Thompson	'57 Chevrolet	16.803	117.836	Speedy Thompson
8	42	Lee Petty	'57 Oldsmobile	16.845	117.542	Petty Enterprises
9	87	Buck Baker	'57 Chevrolet	16.919	117.028	Buck Baker
10	22	Fireball Roberts	'57 Ford	17.001	116.463	Fireball Roberts

Failed to qualify: Eddie Skinner (#28), Ted Chamberlain (#93), Joe Eubanks (#82), Fred Knapp (#37), Duke DeBrizzi (#81), Dave Terrell (#9), Larry Frank (#76), Bill Widenhouse (#5), Arden Mounts (#18), Bob Whitmire (#61), Barney Smith (#16), Jim Linke (#81)

== Finishing order ==
Section reference:

Pos.	St.	#	Driver	Sponsor/Owner	Car	Laps	Status	Led	Winnings
1	7	46	Speedy Thompson	Oates Motor Co. (Speedy Thompson)	'57 Chevrolet	364	running	210	13590
2	1	6	Cotton Owens	Ray Nichels	'57 Pontiac	361	running	18	6100
3	32	98	Marvin Panch	Marvin Panch	'57 Ford	360	running	0	3745
4	12	7	Jim Reed	Jim Reed	'57 Ford	356	running	0	2155
5	9	87	Buck Baker	Buck Baker	'57 Chevrolet	356	running	0	1650
6	45	2	Billy Carden	Hubert Westmoreland	'57 Chevrolet	354	running	0	1225
7	29	14	Billy Myers	Billy Myers	'57 Ford	353	running	0	1125
8	25	40	Johnny Mackison	Camp Hill Special (Johnny Mackison)	'57 Ford	352	running	0	975
9	48	48	Possum Jones	Inalley Chevrolet (Bob Welborn)	'57 Chevrolet	350	running	0	775
10	28	47	Jack Smith	Jack Smith	'57 Chevrolet	348	crash	9	785
11	3	31	Curtis Turner	Smokey Yunick	'57 Ford	346	running	51	1060
12	27	64	Johnny Allen	Spook Crawford	'57 Plymouth	345	running	0	600
13	17	34	Dick Beaty	Dick Beaty	'56 Ford	341	running	0	350
14	4	80	Jimmie Lewallen	Sam Rice	'57 Pontiac	340	running	0	370
15	34	45	Eddie Pagan	Eddie Pagan	'57 Ford	339	running	0	250
16	23	77	Bobby Johns	Shorty Johns	'56 Chevrolet	335	running	0	225
17	26	20	Jimmy Thompson	Jimmy Thompson	'56 Ford	328	running	0	225
18	38	54	Nace Mattingly	Nace Mattingly	'57 Ford	326	running	0	200
19	37	74	L.D. Austin	L.D. Austin	'56 Chevrolet	312	running	0	200
20	11	55	Tiny Lund	Brushy Mountain Motors (A.L. Bumgarner)	'57 Pontiac	308	engine	0	300
21	31	32	Brownie King	Jess Potter	'57 Chevrolet	307	running	0	150
22	35	96	Bobby Keck	Bobby Keck	'57 Chevrolet	283	running	0	150
23	41	51	Roy Tyner	Roy Tyner	'56 Ford	282	running	0	150
24	8	42	Lee Petty	Petty Enterprises	'57 Oldsmobile	281	crash	31	750
25	42	71	George Parrish	Joe Frazier	'56 Studebaker	263	running	0	350
26	33	12	Marvin Porter	Oscar Maples	'57 Ford	221	engine	0	100
27	30	10	Whitey Norman	Whitey Norman	'56 Ford	215	engine	0	100
28	20	44	Rex White	Max Welborn	'57 Chevrolet	210	axle	0	100
29	19	95	Bob Duell	Julian Buesink	'57 Ford	156	radiator	0	100
30	49	13	Peck Peckham	William Meyer	'56 Chevrolet	155	engine	0	100
31	39	35	Bill Champion	John Whitford	'56 Ford	130	rear end	0	100
32	18	97	Bill Amick	Bill Amick	'57 Ford	102	crash	0	150
33	10	22	Fireball Roberts	Fireball Roberts	'57 Ford	101	crash	41	460
34	22	11	Parnelli Jones	Oscar Maples	'57 Ford	99	crash	0	100
35	50	75	Jim Paschal	Frank Hayworth	'57 Ford	84	piston	0	100
36	36	17	Shorty York	Jim Paschal	'57 Mercury	79	engine	0	300
37	16	89	Joe Caspolich	Pappy Crane	'57 Ford	66	crash	0	200
38	46	26	Bill Blair	Sam Rice	'57 Ford	63	crash	0	100
39	24	90	Runt Harris	Junie Donlavey	'57 Chevrolet	50	clutch	0	100
40	14	9	Joe Weatherly	Holman-Moody Racing	'57 Ford	37	crash	0	130
41	13	84	Banjo Matthews	Banjo Matthews	'57 Ford	31	engine	0	120
42	44	30	Cale Yarborough	Bob Weatherly	'57 Pontiac	31	rf hub	0	100
43	2	4	Bobby Myers	Your Oldsmobile Dealer (Petty Enterprises)	'57 Oldsmobile	27	crash	1	260
44	6	3	Paul Goldsmith	Pee Dee Motors (Smokey Yunick)	'57 Ford	27	crash	3	200
45	43	88	Chuck Hanson	Chuck Hansen	'57 Chevrolet	23	piston	0	100
46	21	38	Gwyn Staley	Julian Petty	'57 Chevrolet	22	coil	0	100
47	5	62	Frankie Schneider	Frankie Schneider	'57 Chevrolet	19	engine	0	100
48	15	92	Fonty Flock	Keith Motors (Herb Thomas)	'57 Pontiac	18	crash	0	100
49	40	68	Neil Castles	Neil Castles	'56 Ford	13	oil pressure	0	100
50	47	41	T.A. Toomes	C.M. Julian	'56 Dodge	3	brakes	0	300
Failed to qualify, withdrew, or driver changes:
		5	Bill Widenhouse		Chevrolet				
		9	Dave Terrell		Chevrolet				
		16	Barney Smith		Pontiac				
		18	Arden Mounts		Pontiac				
		28	Eddie Skinner		Ford				
		37	Fred Knapp		Ford				
		61	Bob Whitmire		Ford				
		76	Larry Frank		Chevrolet				
		81	Duke DeBrizzi		Oldsmobile				
		81	Jim Linke		Oldsmobile				
		82	Joe Eubanks		Pontiac				
		93	Ted Chamberlain		Plymouth				

== Timeline ==
Section reference:

- Start of race: Cotton Owens officially started the race as the pole position driver.
- Lap 3: Brake problems on T.A. Toomes' vehicle made him the last-place finisher.
- Lap 7: Curtis Turner took over the lead from Cotton Owens.
- Lap 11: Paul Goldsmith took over the lead from Curtis Turner.
- Lap 13: Oil pressure issues managed to bump Neil Castles out of the race.
- Lap 14: Bobby Myers took over the lead from Paul Goldsmith.
- Lap 15: Curtis Turner took over the lead from Bobby Myers.
- Lap 17: Cotton Owens took over the lead from Curtis Turner.
- Lap 18: Fonty Flock had a terminal crash.
- Lap 19: Frankie Schneider's engine stopped working properly.
- Lap 22: One of Gwyn Staley's coil came loose; forcing him to stop racing for the rest of the day.
- Lap 23: One of Chuck Hansen's racing pistons stopped working; forcing him to stop racing for the rest of the day.
- Lap 27: Fonty Flock, Bobby Myers and Paul Goldsmith crash, resulting in the death of Bobby Myers
- Lap 29: Lee Petty took over the lead from Cotton Owens.
- Lap 37: Joe Weatherly had a terminal crash.
- Lap 41: Fireball Roberts took over the lead from Lee Petty.
- Lap 50: Runt Harris' vehicle had some problems with its clutch; forcing him to exit the race for safety reasons.
- Lap 63: Bill Blair had a terminal crash.
- Lap 66: Joe Caspolich had a terminal crash.
- Lap 70: Lee Petty took over the lead from Fireball Roberts.
- Lap 79: Shorty York blew his engine while racing at high speeds.
- Lap 84: Tom Pistone's vehicle suffered from piston troubles.
- Lap 89: Fireball Roberts took over the lead from Lee Petty.
- Lap 99: Parnelli Jones had a terminal crash.
- Lap 101: Jack Smith took over the lead from Fireball Roberts.
- Lap 102: Bill Amick had a terminal crash.
- Lap 110: Speedy Thompson took over the lead from Jack Smith.
- Lap 130: Bill Champion managed to break the rear end of the vehicle.
- Lap 155: Peck Peckham blew his engine while racing at high speeds.
- Lap 156: The radiator on Bob Duell's vehicle finally gave out.
- Lap 171: Curtis Turner took over the lead from Speedy Thompson.
- Lap 210: Axle problems on Rex White's vehicle managed to force him off the track.
- Lap 215: Whitey Norman blew his engine while racing at high speeds.
- Lap 216: Speedy Thompson took over the lead from Curtis Turner.
- Lap 221: Marvin Porter blew his engine while racing at high speeds.
- Lap 281: Lee Petty had a terminal crash.
- Lap 308: Tiny Lund had a terminal crash.
- Lap 348: Jack Smith had a terminal crash.
- Finish: Speedy Thompson in a 57 chevy sedan won the race by 3 laps over Cotton Owens.

Preceded by 1956	Southern 500 races 1957	Succeeded by 1958
