= Southern 500 =

Auto race held in Darlington, United States

Cook Out Southern 500

NASCAR Cup Series
- Venue: Darlington Raceway
- Location: Darlington, South Carolina, United States
- Corporate sponsor: Cook Out
- First race: 1950
- Distance: 501.322 miles (806.800 km)
- Laps: 367; Stages 1/2: 115 each Final stage: 137
- Previous names: Southern 500 (1950–1988); Heinz Southern 500 (1989–1991); Mountain Dew Southern 500 (1992–1997, 2001–2004); Pepsi Southern 500 (1998–2000); Dodge Charger 500 (2005–2006); Dodge Avenger 500 (2007); Dodge Challenger 500 (2008); Southern 500 presented by GoDaddy.com (2009); Showtime Southern 500 (2010–2011); Bojangles' Southern 500 (2012–2019)
- Most wins (driver): Jeff Gordon (6)
- Most wins (team): Hendrick Motorsports (12)
- Most wins (manufacturer): Chevrolet (29)

Circuit information
- Surface: Asphalt
- Length: 1.366 mi (2.198 km)
- Turns: 4

The Southern 500, officially known as the Cook Out Southern 500 for sponsorship reasons, is a NASCAR Cup Series stock car crown jewel race at Darlington Raceway in Darlington, South Carolina, United States. First held in 1950, the event consists of 367 laps, 501 miles (806 km), and is the second of two stock car events held at Darlington on the oval, the other being the Goodyear 400. From its inception, the race has been typically held on Labor Day weekend.

The Southern 500 is considered one of the crown jewels of the NASCAR calendar and since 2020, the event is usually the first race of the NASCAR Chase. Christopher Bell is the defending race winner, having won the event in 2026.

== History ==
=== Original run on Labor Day weekend ===
The race began in 1950, as NASCAR's first 500-mile race, and it was the only race of such distance until the Daytona 500 debuted in 1959. Through most of its history, the race was one of NASCAR's premier events, and was known as one of Crown Jewel on the NASCAR circuit. From 1985–1997, it served as the fourth race of the popular Winston Million. Two drivers, Bill Elliott (1985) and Jeff Gordon (1997), clinched the Winston Million with victories in the Southern 500.

The Southern 500 was one of the last races on the circuit to embrace naming rights in its title. In 1989, the race added Heinz as a title sponsor, but kept the traditional "Southern" moniker in its official name. From 1992 to 2004, it was sponsored by PepsiCo products (Pepsi or Mountain Dew).

From 1950 to 2003, this annual event was traditionally held on Labor Day weekend (typically the first weekend of September). In the years before 1984, the race was held on Monday, Labor Day itself.

From 1953 to 1996, there was a Miss Southern 500 beauty pageant where the event winner competed in the Miss South Carolina Pageant the following year. In the entire history of the pageant, only two Miss Southern 500s ever won Miss South Carolina (Amanda Spivey: 1995, Janet Powers: 1997).

For the 2004 season, a realignment of the NASCAR schedule saw the race move to November. Track management believed the November date would allow for cooler, more comfortable weather for fans, who had increasingly voiced concerns about the hot, humid, weather. Also, it meant the race would be part of the new Chase for the Championship. Rockingham lost its fall date to Fontana, and the Pop Secret 500 was moved to the prestigious Labor Day weekend date.

In 2004, Francis Ferko, a shareholder of the company that owned Texas Motor Speedway, sued NASCAR, saying they had violated antitrust laws by refusing to have a second race at Texas Motor Speedway, as many other tracks had. The case was settled in his favor, and NASCAR was forced to give up one of its Darlington dates so that a second race could be held at Texas.

=== Loss of Labor Day weekend ===
Starting in 2005, Darlington was forced to contract down to one race per year. Officials replaced Darlington's two Cup Series events with one 500-mile race. The event's traditional moniker "Southern 500" was dropped for the time being. The race was situated on the Saturday of Mother's Day weekend in mid-May. Mother's Day weekend was a date that had been mostly avoided by NASCAR in recent decades. The Nashville 420 had used the Saturday of Mother's Day weekend for a time until it was discontinued in 1984. Moving the Darlington race to May loosely mimicked the period in which the spring race, once known as the Rebel 500, was held on or around Confederate Memorial Day.

Dodge, which had been sponsoring Darlington's spring race at that point, took over sponsorship of the 500-mile race in May. The title of the race was based on various Dodge models including the Charger, Challenger, and Avenger. The race would be held under the lights and proved to be well-attended.

Without a title sponsor after 2008, the race re-adopted the moniker of "Southern 500". Track officials and fans were anxious to revive the traditional name. GoDaddy was signed as presenting sponsor, and it became known as the Southern 500 presented by GoDaddy.com. The race was then sponsored by Showtime Networks from 2010 to 2011, and Bojangles' from 2012 to 2019.

While enjoying renewed success in attendance and popularity in May, there was still desire by some fans, media, and others to move the race back to its traditional Labor Day date. Especially after replacement races (Fontana and Atlanta) failed to gain any foothold on the desirable Labor Day weekend holiday slot. Bruton Smith, CEO of Speedway Motorsports even offered to buy the Darlington track to return it to Labor Day weekend and "get it back where it belongs".

In 2014, the race switched dates with the spring Kansas race, and ran in the second weekend in April.

=== Return to Labor Day weekend ===
A revived interest in moving the Southern 500 back to Labor Day grew over the summer of 2014. In August 2014, it was announced that 2015 Southern 500 would return to its traditional Labor Day weekend slot, the first time since 2003. To combat the issue of heat and humidity that had resulted in the race originally being moved, the race is currently run Sunday night of Labor Day weekend, under the lights, with temperatures being cooler than they are during daytime hours.

To celebrate the return of the race to its traditional weekend, a concerted and highly publicized effort among NASCAR, the track, and teams were made to theme the weekend a "NASCAR Throwback." Thirty-two cars in the 43 car field ran throwback paint schemes during the event, with various other throwback aspects planned throughout the weekend. It was announced days before the race that legendary broadcasters Ken Squier, Ned Jarrett and Dale Jarrett would announce part of the race. Some hour into the broadcasting, Squier, and the Jarretts called the race lap-by-lap for about an hour. NBC, which also utilized its logos from the 1970s during the broadcast, was widely praised by many for bringing back old memories in the sport. The success of the event led to a nomination for Sports Event of the Year.

Due to the success and popularity in 2015, the "Throwback" theme for the weekend was run from 2015 to 2020. In 2021, with the reinstatement of the second weekend during the 2020 season, the theme was moved to the spring race in order to allow playoff teams to focus on the playoff.

Bojangles' ended its title sponsorship of the race after the 2019 race.

From 2015 to 2020, the race weekend has been themed "NASCAR Throwback", with many cars fielding "Throwback" paint schemes (the revitalized spring race has taken that role from 2021–2025).

When the 2020 schedule was released, the Southern 500 was scheduled as the only race at the track, again on Labor Day weekend. However, due to the COVID-19 pandemic, Darlington Raceway returned to having two race weekends, as The Real Heroes 400 and the Toyota 500, as part of returning to the track following a nine-week pause. The Southern 500 became the first race of the NASCAR playoffs due to NASCAR ending the season a week earlier than usual, at Phoenix Raceway. The race was previously held in the playoffs when it began in 2004 as the ninth race. This schedule placement became permanent starting in 2021, except in 2024 when it was made the regular season finale because of a two-week break imposed by NBC Sports for the 2024 Summer Olympics.

Cook Out assumed naming rights for the Southern 500 in 2020.

=== Trophy ===
The trophy features photos of previous winners at Darlington.

=== Reception ===
The Southern 500 is considered one of the crown jewels of the NASCAR calendar, and has been nicknamed NASCAR's "oldest superspeedway race." For decades, the race has been considered by competitors and media as one of the more difficult and challenging races on the NASCAR schedule, owing much to the track's unusual, asymmetrical egg-shape, rough pavement, and overall unforgiving nature. Darlington Raceway itself has a long and storied reputation as the "Track Too Tough to Tame."

== Selected race summaries ==
- 1950: The very first running lasted over six hours and multiple cars blew tires. Johnny Mantz drove a conservative race and emerged with the win.
- 1960: In a race with 48 entries, numerous crashes occurred. Ankrum "Spook" Crawford was injured when a car crashed into the unprotected pit road area; later Bobby Johns crashed in the pits, killing three. Richard Petty led 106 laps but spun out with 50 laps to go. Pole-sitter Fireball Roberts broke an axle and finished ninth, 11 laps down. Rex White was flagged the winner, but a reexamination of scoring showed White was credited with one extra lap he had not run, giving the win to Buck Baker.
- 1965: Darel Dieringer broke with 39 laps to go after leading 199 laps, leaving Ned Jarrett alone by 14 laps en route to the win. The race saw a scary melee when young Cale Yarborough crashed with Sam McQuagg in Turn One and Cale's car flew over the guardrail and landed outside the speedway; he was uninjured and interviewed for ABC Sports by Chris Economaki.
- 1966: Darel Dieringer passed Richard Petty with seven laps to go and stormed to the win. A scary crash erupted in Turn One as Earl Balmer smashed into the guardrail on Lap 186 and spun atop it, throwing debris into the open-air press box in the turn.
- 1967: Richard Petty wins his only Southern 500
- 1970: Buddy Baker joined his father Buck Baker in winning the Southern 500. Five of the top six finishers drove either 1969 Dodge Daytonas or 1970 Plymouth Superbirds, making this the only Darlington race won by the famed winged Chryslers. LeeRoy Yarbrough, due to compete in the event, withdrew after a last-minute offer of a ride in the California 500.
- 1974: Cale Yarborough became a three-time Southern 500 winner, edging sophomore sensation Darrell Waltrip. Crashes thinned the field and eliminated the likes of Richard Petty, Buddy Baker, David Pearson, and Bobby Allison; singled out for criticism was Richie Panch, involved in three wrecks during the day. Allison accused Yarborough of wrecking him, a charge Yarborough angrily denied.
- 1976: David Pearson ended a career slump in the Southern 500, taking his ninth win of his magic 1976 season, his first Southern 500 after six wins in the Rebel 500. Richard Petty finished second, the 60th time in their careers Pearson and Petty had finished 1–2 in a Winston Cup Grand National race (the duo would finish 1–2 three more times in their careers with Pearson holding a 33–30 edge). Both Jimmy Carter and Bob Dole visited the race while on the campaign trail.
- 1977: A huge fight between Cale Yarborough and Darrell Waltrip ended in a crash and Pearson grabbed his second straight Southern 500. Following the race D. K. Ulrich, caught up in the fracas, asked Cale why he'd hit him; Cale replied "I didn't hit you, Jaws did; Jaws Waltrip" – creating a popular nickname for Waltrip.
- 1979: Pearson achieved vindication at the same track where earlier that year a pit accident cost him his ride with Wood Brothers Racing. Driving Rod Osterlund's Chevrolet while regular driver Dale Earnhardt recovered from late-July injury, Pearson made up a lap when Darrell Waltrip spun out of the lead with 70 laps to go, then spun again some 20 laps later; he lost 12 laps and finished 11th after leading 165 laps. Pearson edged young driver Bill Elliott for the win, his 104th career Winston Cup Grand National win.
- 1980: Once again Waltrip and Pearson were keys to a shocking Southern 500; this time Waltrip, embroiled in a contract fight with DiGard Racing, led 196 laps from the pole while Pearson once again had to make up a lap, this time driving Hoss Ellington's Chevrolet. But a timing chain broke on Waltrip, ending his race 39 laps from the finish. Benny Parsons grabbed the lead while Pearson got back on the lead lap. A late yellow for Cale Yarborough (who'd had a miserable day with a fuel fire and several earlier spins) set up a five-lap shootout between Parsons, Pearson, and Dale Earnhardt; Pearson took the lead on the restart, Earnhardt passed on Lap 364 but Pearson retook the lead on that same lap, but with two to go all three leaders crashed, in Turn, One on oil from a backmarker; Pearson limped to the line, but Terry Labonte caught and swung past at the white flag, grabbing his first career win.
- 1982: The most competitive running of the Southern 500 took place as the lead changed 41 times among 17 drivers. Bobby Allison in the #88 led 88 laps before breaking, while Darrell Waltrip in Junior Johnson's Buick led 23 laps before blowing his engine. In all 14 cautions flew and helped set up a four-car shootout involving the cream of stock car racing's old guard (Cale Yarborough and Richard Petty) and the cream of its up-and-coming new guard (Dale Earnhardt and Bill Elliott). Cale edged Petty, Earnhardt, and Elliott for his record fifth Southern 500, and what would be his last victory with M.C. Anderson's race team.
- 1985: NASCAR's Winston Million program paid out when Bill Elliott took the win in the Southern 500, thus winning three of NASCAR's four biggest races (he'd won the Daytona 500 and Winston 500 earlier in the year). Challenges by Dale Earnhardt and Cale Yarborough fell apart; Yarborough finished second despite breaking a power steering line. The million-dollar program made Elliott's winnings the highest in NASCAR history to that point.
- 1986: Tim Richmond and Geoff Bodine swept the front row and combined to lead 330 laps. Intermittent rain pushed the four-hour contest to darkness. Bodine ran dry and finished eighth while Bill Elliott's attempt to stretch his fuel came short with six to go and he finished third behind Richmond and Bobby Allison. The win was the first at Darlington for crew chief Harry Hyde. Dale Earnhardt hit Richard Petty six laps in and Petty was eliminated; "His mind goes out of gear," said an angered Petty.
- 1987: Rain-shortened 1987 running after just 202 laps; the battle for the win turned into a showdown between Earnhardt and Richard Petty; Petty gunned past Earnhardt on a Lap 188 restart but Earnhardt retook the lead on lap 191 just before rain brought out what would be the race-ending yellow at Lap 198. Rookie sensation Davey Allison won the pole and led 86 laps but crashed in Turn Four at Lap 164; the crash swept up Lake Speed while Mike Potter spun behind them and was drilled by Benny Parsons.
- 1988: A classic three-way battle between Bill Elliott, Rusty Wallace, and Dale Earnhardt who led a combined 289 of the 367 laps. In the end, Elliott led 154 of the 367 laps, and took home his 2nd Southern 500 victory, en route to capturing the 1988 Winston Cup Championship.
- 1989: Darrell Waltrip had opportunity to win the Winston Million but crashed, leaving Dale Earnhardt to his second Southern 500 win.
- 1990: Earnhardt, Bill Elliott, and Geoff Bodine timed together in the top three and combined to lead 286 laps between them; Bodine faded to eighth while Elliott finished fourth and Ernie Irvan led 70 laps and grabbed second, but no one could catch Earnhardt en route to his third Southern 500 in his previous four starts. The race was famous for a vicious feud between Ken Schrader and Morgan Shepherd; Schrader crashed early in the race after an encounter with Shepherd, then after getting repairs he sped onto the track and rammed Shepherd in the third turn. Shepherd finished 21st while Schrader was parked.
- 1991: Harry Gant won the Southern 500 for the second time, leading 152 laps while pole-sitter Davey Allison led 151 laps but finished four laps down. Gant's win began a four-race win streak, the first such in NASCAR since 1987.
- 1992: Davey Allison entered the race with a chance for the Winston Million, but rain interfered, and cut the race short. Harry Gant and Davey Allison combined to lead 163 laps. With rain approaching the area, the leaders cycled through a series of pit stops around lap 292, but a scant handful of drivers stayed out. Allison's Crew chief Larry McReynolds sent a crew member to the NASCAR hauler to look at the weather radar. The crew member's misinterpretation of the radar led to Allison coming into the pits and changing four tires. Darrell Waltrip was among those who gambled and stayed out, inhered the lead just as the yellow came out for rain on lap 297. The skies opened up, and the race has ended after 298 laps. Davey Allison slid to 5th in the pit stop shuffle and was denied his chance at the million-dollar bonus. The victory would be Waltrip's 84th and final career win.
- 1993: After an intense battle Mark Martin broke away from Dale Earnhardt and won the Southern 500, his fourth straight Winston Cup win. He and Earnhardt combined to lead 279 laps. Ernie Irvan finished fifth in his debut drive with Robert Yates after an acrimonious split from Morgan McClure Motorsports; Jeff Purvis finished 26th in the McClure Chevrolet.
- 1994: Despite battling overheating issues in his car, Bill Elliott scores his 3rd win in the Southern 500, and the 40th overall win of his NASCAR career. It was the final victory for the team of Junior Johnson & Associates and would also be the final win Elliott would capture in NASCAR until 2001, 7 years later.
- 1997: The initial Winston Million winner in 1985, Bill Elliott, leads a race high 181 of the 367 laps, but ultimately finishes 4th. Jeff Gordon would go on to win his 3rd (of four straight) Southern 500 over Jeff Burton, and with this win (along with his Daytona 500 and Coca-Cola 600 wins earlier in the year) would clinch the Winston Million in its final running of the promotion in NASCAR.
- 2003: In the last Southern 500 held on Labor Day weekend until 2015, Terry Labonte led the final 33 laps and held off Kevin Harvick for his last win in the Cup series. The race has been labeled by many as the most popular win of 2003 as everybody was always happy to see Labonte win.
- 2011: Regan Smith stayed out on a late caution when the rest of the field pitted and sweated out a late crash involving Kevin Harvick and Kyle Busch to edge Carl Edwards for his first NASCAR win. The win was overshadowed as Harvick and Busch collided on pit road when Harvick tried to throw a punch at Busch inside his cockpit; NASCAR fined the two drivers and put them on probation after the race.
- 2012: Jimmie Johnson stayed out during the final round of pit stops on the advice of crew chief Chad Knaus. Johnson would later hold off Denny Hamlin and Tony Stewart to score team owner Rick Hendrick's 200th NASCAR Cup Series victory.
- 2015: 2015 marked several changes. Most notably, the race was rescheduled to its traditional Labor Day date. As part of this return to tradition, the race was dubbed a 'throwback weekend', and the majority of teams entered into the race drove cars with retro paint jobs based on classic paint schemes used in the 1970s and 1980s. Also, retro-style ads were placed on the outside walls, and part of the race was called by former NASCAR broadcasters Ken Squier and father and son Ned and Dale Jarrett. The race also utilized a new experimental rules package that took away downforce from the car. The new package resulted in a very intense race, which saw a record-breaking 18 caution flags, leading to the average green flag run only being about 14.7 laps long. Carl Edwards rallied back from two laps down to overtake Brad Keselowski and take his second win of the year.
- 2024: 2024 marked the race being held as the regular season finale due to schedule issues regarding the 2024 Summer Olympics, Chase Briscoe would win after holding off Kyle Busch, getting just his second win of his career, and the final win for Stewart–Haas Racing.

== Past winners ==
Year	Day	Date	No.	Driver	Team	Manufacturer	Race distance		Race time	Average speed	Report	Ref
Year	Day	Date	No.	Driver	Team	Manufacturer	Laps	Miles (km)	Race time	Average speed	Report	Ref
1950	Monday	September 4	98	Johnny Mantz	Hubert Westmoreland	Plymouth	400	500 (804.672)	6:38:40	75.250 mph (121.103 km/h)	Report	
1951	Monday	September 3	92	Herb Thomas	Herb Thomas	Hudson	400	500 (804.672)	6:30:05	76.906 mph (123.768 km/h)	Report	
1952	Monday	September 1	14	Fonty Flock	Frank Christian	Oldsmobile	400	500 (804.672)	6:42:37	74.512 mph (119.915 km/h)	Report	
1953	Monday	September 7	87	Buck Baker	Bob Griffin	Oldsmobile	364	500.5 (805.476)	5:23:19	92.881 mph (149.477 km/h)	Report	
1954	Monday	September 6	92	Herb Thomas	Herb Thomas	Hudson	364	500.5 (805.476)	5:16:01	95.026 mph (152.930 km/h)	Report	
1955	Monday	September 5	92	Herb Thomas	Herb Thomas	1955 Chevrolet	364	500.5 (805.476)	5:25:25	92.281 mph (148.512 km/h)	Report	
1956	Monday	September 3	99	Curtis Turner	Charlie Schwam	Ford	364	500.5 (805.476)	5:15:33	95.167 mph (153.156 km/h)	Report	
1957	Monday	September 2	46	Speedy Thompson	Speedy Thompson	1957 Chevrolet	364	500.5 (805.476)	5:00:01	100.094 mph (161.086 km/h)	Report	
1958	Monday	September 1	22	Fireball Roberts	Frank Strickland	1957 Chevrolet	364	500.5 (805.476)	4:52:44	102.585 mph (165.095 km/h)	Report	
1959	Monday	September 7	7	Jim Reed	Jim Reed	Chevrolet	364	500.5 (805.476)	4:28:30	111.836 mph (179.983 km/h)	Report	
1960	Monday	September 5	47	Buck Baker	Jack Smith	Pontiac	364	500.5 (805.476)	4:43:34	105.901 mph (170.431 km/h)	Report	
1961	Monday	September 4	29	Nelson Stacy	Dudley Farrell	Ford	364	500.5 (805.476)	4:54:45	117.787 mph (189.560 km/h)	Report	
1962	Monday	September 3	66	Larry Frank	Ratus Walters	Ford	364	500.5 (805.476)	4:14:34	117.965 mph (189.846 km/h)	Report	
1963	Monday	September 2	22	Fireball Roberts	Holman-Moody	Ford	364	500.5 (805.476)	3:51:23	129.784 mph (208.867 km/h)	Report	
1964	Monday	September 7	3	Buck Baker	Ray Fox	Dodge	364	500.5 (805.476)	4:15:01	117.757 mph (189.512 km/h)	Report	
1965	Monday	September 6	11	Ned Jarrett	Bondy Long	Ford	364	500.5 (805.476)	4:19:09	115.878 mph (186.488 km/h)	Report	
1966	Monday	September 5	16	Darel Dieringer	Bud Moore Engineering	Mercury	364	500.5 (805.476)	4:21:31	114.830 mph (184.801 km/h)	Report	
1967	Monday	September 4	43	Richard Petty	Petty Enterprises	Plymouth	364	500.5 (805.476)	3:50:15	130.423 mph (209.895 km/h)	Report	
1968	Monday	September 2	21	Cale Yarborough	Wood Brothers Racing	Mercury	364	500.5 (805.476)	3:58:05	126.132 mph (202.990 km/h)	Report	
1969	Monday	September 1	98	LeeRoy Yarbrough	Junior Johnson & Associates	Ford	230*	316.25 (508.955)	2:59:40	105.612 mph (169.966 km/h)	Report	
1970	Monday	September 7	6	Buddy Baker	Cotton Owens	Dodge	367	501.322 (806.799)	3:55:03	128.817 mph (207.311 km/h)	Report	
1971	Monday	September 6	21	Bobby Allison	Holman-Moody	Mercury	367	501.322 (806.799)	3:48:55	131.398 mph (211.465 km/h)	Report	
1972	Monday	September 4	12	Bobby Allison	Junior Johnson & Associates	Chevrolet	367	501.322 (806.799)	3:54:46	128.124 mph (206.196 km/h)	Report	
1973	Monday	September 3	11	Cale Yarborough	Richard Howard	Chevrolet	367	501.322 (806.799)	3:44:25	134.033 mph (215.705 km/h)	Report	
1974	Monday	September 2	11	Cale Yarborough	Junior Johnson & Associates	Chevrolet	367	501.322 (806.799)	4:30:48	111.075 mph (178.758 km/h)	Report	
1975	Monday	September 1	16	Bobby Allison	Penske Racing	AMC	367	501.322 (806.799)	4:17:28	116.825 mph (188.012 km/h)	Report	
1976	Monday	September 6	21	David Pearson	Wood Brothers Racing	Mercury	367	501.322 (806.799)	4:09:33	120.534 mph (193.981 km/h)	Report	
1977	Monday	September 5	21	David Pearson	Wood Brothers Racing	Mercury	367	501.322 (806.799)	4:41:48	106.797 mph (171.873 km/h)	Report	
1978	Monday	September 4	11	Cale Yarborough	Junior Johnson & Associates	Oldsmobile	367	501.322 (806.799)	4:17:46	116.828 mph (188.016 km/h)	Report	
1979	Monday	September 3	2	David Pearson	Rod Osterlund Racing	Chevrolet	367	501.322 (806.799)	3:58:14	126.259 mph (203.194 km/h)	Report	
1980	Monday	September 1	44	Terry Labonte	Billy Hagan	Chevrolet	367	501.322 (806.799)	4:21:05	115.210 mph (185.413 km/h)	Report	
1981	Monday	September 7	21	Neil Bonnett	Wood Brothers Racing	Ford	367	501.322 (806.799)	3:57:57	126.410 mph (203.437 km/h)	Report	
1982	Monday	September 6	27	Cale Yarborough	M. C. Anderson Racing	Buick	367	501.322 (806.799)	4:21:00	115.224 mph (185.435 km/h)	Report	
1983	Monday	September 5	22	Bobby Allison	DiGard Motorsports	Buick	367	501.322 (806.799)	4:03:52	123.343 mph (198.501 km/h)	Report	
1984	Sunday	September 2	33	Harry Gant	Mach 1 Racing	Chevrolet	367	501.322 (806.799)	3:54:02	128.270 mph (206.431 km/h)	Report	
1985	Sunday	September 1	9	Bill Elliott*	Melling Racing	Ford	367	501.322 (806.799)	4:08:02	121.254 mph (195.139 km/h)	Report	
1986	Sunday	August 31	25	Tim Richmond	Hendrick Motorsports	Chevrolet	367	501.322 (806.799)	4:08:45	121.068 mph (194.840 km/h)	Report	
1987	Sunday	September 6	3	Dale Earnhardt	Richard Childress Racing	Chevrolet	202*	275.932 (444.069)	2:23:19	115.520 mph (185.911 km/h)	Report	
1988	Sunday	September 4	9	Bill Elliott	Melling Racing	Ford	367	501.322 (806.799)	3:54:27	128.297 mph (206.474 km/h)	Report	
1989	Sunday	September 3	3	Dale Earnhardt	Richard Childress Racing	Chevrolet	367	501.322 (806.799)	3:42:03	135.462 mph (218.005 km/h)	Report	
1990	Sunday	September 2	3	Dale Earnhardt	Richard Childress Racing	Chevrolet	367	501.322 (806.799)	4:04:16	123.141 mph (198.176 km/h)	Report	
1991	Sunday	September 1	33	Harry Gant	Leo Jackson Racing	Oldsmobile	367	501.322 (806.799)	3:45:18	133.508 mph (214.860 km/h)	Report	
1992	Sunday	September 6	17	Darrell Waltrip	DarWal, Inc.	Chevrolet	298*	407.068 (655.112)	3:09:10	129.114 mph (207.789 km/h)	Report	
1993	Sunday	September 5	6	Mark Martin	Roush Racing	Ford	351*	479.466 (771.625)	3:28:34	137.932 mph (221.980 km/h)	Report	
1994	Sunday	September 4	11	Bill Elliott	Junior Johnson & Associates	Ford	367	501.322 (806.799)	3:55:05	127.952 mph (205.919 km/h)	Report	
1995	Sunday	September 3	24	Jeff Gordon	Hendrick Motorsports	Chevrolet	367	501.322 (806.799)	4:08:07	121.231 mph (195.102 km/h)	Report	
1996	Sunday	September 1	24	Jeff Gordon	Hendrick Motorsports	Chevrolet	367	501.322 (806.799)	3:41:34	135.757 mph (218.480 km/h)	Report	
1997	Sunday	August 31	24	Jeff Gordon*	Hendrick Motorsports	Chevrolet	367	501.322 (806.799)	4:08:17	121.149 mph (194.970 km/h)	Report	
1998	Sunday	September 6	24	Jeff Gordon	Hendrick Motorsports	Chevrolet	367	501.322 (806.799)	3:36:21	139.031 mph (223.749 km/h)	Report	
1999	Sunday	September 5	99	Jeff Burton	Roush Racing	Ford	270*	368.82 (593.558)	3:25:15	107.816 mph (173.513 km/h)	Report	
2000	Sunday	September 3	18	Bobby Labonte	Joe Gibbs Racing	Pontiac	328*	448.048 (721.063)	4:08:20	108.273 mph (174.249 km/h)	Report	
2001	Sunday	September 2	22	Ward Burton	Bill Davis Racing	Dodge	367	501.322 (806.799)	4:05:00	122.773 mph (197.584 km/h)	Report	
2002	Sunday	September 1	24	Jeff Gordon	Hendrick Motorsports	Chevrolet	367	501.322 (806.799)	4:13:35	118.617 mph (190.896 km/h)	Report	
2003	Sunday	August 31	5	Terry Labonte	Hendrick Motorsports	Chevrolet	367	501.322 (806.799)	4:09:08	120.733 mph (194.301 km/h)	Report	
2004*	Sunday	November 14	48	Jimmie Johnson	Hendrick Motorsports	Chevrolet	367	501.322 (806.799)	4:00:33	125.044 mph (201.239 km/h)	Report	
2005	Saturday	May 7	16	Greg Biffle	Roush Racing	Ford	370*	505.42 (813.394)	4:06:29	123.031 mph (197.999 km/h)	Report	
2006	Saturday	May 13	16	Greg Biffle	Roush Racing	Ford	367	501.322 (806.799)	3:42:36	135.127 mph (217.466 km/h)	Report	
2007	Sunday	May 13*	24	Jeff Gordon	Hendrick Motorsports	Chevrolet	367	501.322 (806.799)	4:01:50	124.372 mph (200.157 km/h)	Report	
2008	Saturday	May 10	18	Kyle Busch	Joe Gibbs Racing	Toyota	367	501.322 (806.799)	3:34:19	140.35 mph (225.87 km/h)	Report	
2009	Saturday	May 9	5	Mark Martin	Hendrick Motorsports	Chevrolet	367	501.322 (806.799)	4:11:19	119.687 mph (192.618 km/h)	Report	
2010	Saturday	May 8	11	Denny Hamlin	Joe Gibbs Racing	Toyota	367	501.322 (806.799)	3:57:35	126.605 mph (203.751 km/h)	Report	
2011	Saturday	May 7	78	Regan Smith	Furniture Row Racing	Chevrolet	370*	505.42 (813.394)	3:53:51	129.678 mph (208.697 km/h)	Report	
2012	Saturday	May 12	48	Jimmie Johnson	Hendrick Motorsports	Chevrolet	368*	502.688 (808.997)	3:45:25	133.802 mph (215.333 km/h)	Report	
2013	Saturday	May 11	20	Matt Kenseth	Joe Gibbs Racing	Toyota	367	501.322 (806.799)	3:32:45	141.383 mph (227.534 km/h)	Report	
2014	Saturday	April 12	4	Kevin Harvick	Stewart–Haas Racing	Chevrolet	374*	510.884 (822.188)	3:53:37	131.211 mph (211.164 km/h)	Report	
2015	Sunday	September 6	19	Carl Edwards	Joe Gibbs Racing	Toyota	367	501.322 (806.799)	4:28:35	111.993 mph (180.235 km/h)	Report	
2016	Sunday	September 4	78	Martin Truex Jr.	Furniture Row Racing	Toyota	367	501.322 (806.799)	3:57:54	126.437 mph (203.481 km/h)	Report	
2017	Sunday	September 3	11	Denny Hamlin	Joe Gibbs Racing	Toyota	367	501.322 (806.799)	3:46:34	132.761 mph (213.658 km/h)	Report	
2018	Sunday	September 2	2	Brad Keselowski	Team Penske	Ford	367	501.322 (806.799)	3:48:54	131.408 mph (211.481 km/h)	Report	
2019	Sunday; Monday	September 1–2	20	Erik Jones	Joe Gibbs Racing	Toyota	367	501.322 (806.799)	3:44:46	133.825 mph (215.370 km/h)	Report	
2020	Sunday	September 6	4	Kevin Harvick	Stewart–Haas Racing	Ford	367	501.322 (806.799)	3:47:26	132.256 mph (212.845 km/h)	Report	
2021	Sunday	September 5	11	Denny Hamlin	Joe Gibbs Racing	Toyota	367	501.322 (806.799)	4:08:01	121.279 mph (195.180 km/h)	Report	
2022	Sunday	September 4	43	Erik Jones	Petty GMS Motorsports	Chevrolet	367	501.322 (806.799)	4:09:49	120.406 mph (193.775 km/h)	Report	
2023	Sunday	September 3	5	Kyle Larson	Hendrick Motorsports	Chevrolet	367	501.322 (806.799)	4:08:47	120.906 mph (194.579 km/h)	Report	
2024	Sunday	September 1	14	Chase Briscoe	Stewart–Haas Racing	Ford	367	501.322 (806.799)	3:55:14	127.800 mph (205.674 km/h)	Report	
2025	Sunday	August 31	19	Chase Briscoe	Joe Gibbs Racing	Toyota	367	501.322 (806.799)	3:51:07	130.148 mph (209.453 km/h)	Report	
2026	Sunday	September 6	20	Christopher Bell	Joe Gibbs Racing	Toyota	367	501.322 (806.799)	4:03:05	123.741 mph (199.142 km/h)	Report	
2027	Sunday	September 5									Report	

- 1969 and 1993: Race shortened due to rain/darkness.
- 1987, 1992, 1999, and 2000: Race shortened due to rain.
- 2005, 2011–2012, and 2014: Race extended due to NASCAR overtime.
- 2007: Race postponed from Saturday night to Sunday afternoon due to rain.
- 2019: Race started on Sunday but finished Monday morning due to rain.

=== Multiple winners (drivers) ===
# wins	Driver	Years won
6	Jeff Gordon	1995–1998, 2002, 2007
5	Cale Yarborough	1968, 1973–1974, 1978, 1982
4	Bobby Allison	1971–1972, 1975, 1983
3	Herb Thomas	1951, 1954–1955
3	Buck Baker	1953, 1960, 1964
3	David Pearson	1976–1977, 1979
3	Dale Earnhardt	1987, 1989–1990
3	Bill Elliott	1985, 1988, 1994
3	Denny Hamlin	2010, 2017, 2021
2	Fireball Roberts	1958, 1963
2	Harry Gant	1984, 1991
2	Terry Labonte	1980, 2003
2	Mark Martin	1993, 2009
2	Greg Biffle	2005–2006
2	Jimmie Johnson	2004, 2012
2	Kevin Harvick	2014, 2020
2	Erik Jones	2019, 2022
2	Chase Briscoe	2024–2025

=== Multiple winners (teams) ===
# wins	Team	Years won
12	Hendrick Motorsports	1986, 1995–1998, 2002–2004, 2007, 2009, 2012, 2023
10	Joe Gibbs Racing	2000, 2008, 2010, 2013, 2015, 2017, 2019, 2021, 2025–2026
4	Junior Johnson & Associates	1969, 1974, 1978, 1994
4	Roush Racing	1993, 1999, 2005–2006
4	Wood Brothers Racing	1968, 1976–1977, 1981
3	Herb Thomas	1951, 1954–1955
3	Richard Childress Racing	1987, 1989–1990
3	Stewart–Haas Racing	2014, 2020, 2024
2	Holman-Moody	1963, 1971
2	Richard Howard	1972–1973
2	Melling Racing	1985, 1988
2	Furniture Row Racing	2011, 2016
2	Team Penske	1975, 2018

=== Manufacturer wins ===
# wins	Manufacturer	Years won
29	Chevrolet	1955, 1957–1959, 1972–1974, 1979–1980, 1984, 1986–1987, 1989–1990, 1992, 1995–1998, 2002–2004, 2007, 2009, 2011–2012, 2014, 2022–2023
17	Ford	1956, 1961–1963, 1965, 1969, 1981, 1985, 1988, 1993–1994, 1999, 2005–2006, 2018, 2020, 2024
10	Toyota	2008, 2010, 2013, 2015–2017, 2019, 2021, 2025–2026
5	Mercury	1966, 1968, 1971, 1976–1977
4	Oldsmobile	1952–1953, 1978, 1991
3	Dodge	1964, 1970, 2001
2	Hudson	1951, 1954
2	Plymouth	1950, 1967
2	Buick	1982, 1983
2	Pontiac	1960, 2000
1	AMC	1975

== See also ==
- Darlington Record Club

Previous race: Coke Zero Sugar 400	NASCAR Cup Series; Cook Out Southern 500	Next race: Cook Out 400
