= 1958 NASCAR Grand National Series =

Seasons
- ← 1957 1959 →

The 1958 NASCAR Grand National Series was the 10th season of professional stock car racing in the United States. The season, which began on November 3, 1957 in Fayetteville, North Carolina, was contested over 51 races. The season ended at Lakewood Speedway in Atlanta, Georgia, on October 26, 1958. Lee Petty was the drivers' champion. Shorty Rollins was the Rookie of the Year.

== Results ==
D Dirt oval
P Paved oval

No	Date	Track	Track type		Pole Position	Winning Driver	Report
No	Date	Track	Pavement/shape	Length category	Pole Position	Winning Driver	Report
1	November 3	Champion Speedway (Fayetteville, NC)	P paved oval	short track	Jack Smith	Rex White	
2	February 23	Daytona Beach Road Course (Daytona Beach Shores, FL)	T paved/dirt temporary oval circuit	long/high speed	Paul Goldsmith	Paul Goldsmith	
3	March 2	Concord Speedway (Midland, NC)	D dirt oval	short track	Speedy Thompson	Lee Petty	
4	March 15	Champion Speedway (Fayetteville, NC)	P paved oval	short track	Lee Petty	Curtis Turner	
5	March 16	Wilson Speedway (Wilson, NC)	D dirt oval	short track	Marvin Panch	Lee Petty	
6	March 23	Orange Speedway (Hillsborough, NC)	D dirt oval	short track	Buck Baker	Buck Baker	
7	April 5	Champion Speedway (Fayetteville, NC)	P paved oval	short track	Buck Baker	Bob Welborn	
8	April 10	Columbia Speedway (Cayce, SC)	D dirt oval	short track	Possum Jones	Speedy Thompson	
9	April 12	Piedmont Interstate Fairgrounds (Spartanburg, SC)	D dirt oval	short track	Speedy Thompson	Speedy Thompson	
10	April 13	Lakewood Speedway (Atlanta, GA)	D dirt oval	intermediate	Joe Weatherly	Curtis Turner	
11	April 18	Charlotte Fairgrounds Speedway (Charlotte, NC)	D dirt oval	short track	Curtis Turner	Curtis Turner	
12	April 20	Martinsville Speedway (Manassas, VA)	D dirt oval	short track	Buck Baker	Bob Welborn	
13	April 25	Old Dominion Speedway (Thornburg, VA)	P paved oval	short track	Eddie Pagan	Frankie Schneider	
14	April 27	Old Bridge Stadium (Old Bridge Township, NJ)	P paved oval	short track	Jim Reed (racing driver)	Jim Reed	
15	May 3	Greenville-Pickens Speedway (Easley, SC)	D dirt oval	short track	Jack Smith	Jack Smith	
16	May 11	Greensboro Agricultural Fairgrounds (Greensboro, NC)	D dirt oval	short track	Bob Welborn	Bob Welborn	
17	May 15	Starkey Speedway (Roanoke, VA)	P paved oval	short track	Jim Reed	Jim Reed	
18	May 18	North Wilkesboro Speedway (North Wilkesboro, NC)	P paved oval	short track	Jack Smith	Junior Johnson	
19	May 24	Bowman Gray Stadium (Winston-Salem, NC)	P paved oval	short track	Rex White	Bob Welborn	
20	May 30	Trenton Speedway (Trenton, NJ)	P paved oval	intermediate	Marvin Panch	Fireball Roberts	
21	June 1	Riverside International Raceway (Riverside, CA)	P paved road course	road course	Parnelli Jones	Eddie Gray	
22	June 5	Columbia Speedway (Cayce, SC)	D dirt oval	short track	Buck Baker	Junior Johnson	
23	June 12	New Bradford Speedway (Bradford, PA)	D dirt oval	short track	Bob Duell	Junior Johnson	
24	June 15	Reading Fairgrounds Speedway (Reading, PA)	D dirt oval	short track	Speedy Thompson	Junior Johnson	
25	June 25	Lincoln Speedway (Abbottstown, PA)	D dirt oval	short track	Ken Rush	Lee Petty	
26	June 28	Hickory Speedway (Hickory, NC)	D dirt oval	short track	Speedy Thompson	Lee Petty	
27	June 29	Asheville Weaverville Speedway (Weaverville, NC)	D dirt oval	short track	Rex White	Rex White	
28	July 4	Raleigh Speedway (Raleigh, NC)	D dirt oval	short track	Cotton Owens	Fireball Roberts	
29	July 12	McCormick Field Raceway (Asheville, NC)	P paved oval	short track	Jim Paschal	Jim Paschal	
30	July 16	Stateline Speedway (Busti, NY)	D dirt oval	short track	Lee Petty	Shorty Rollins	
31	July 18	Exhibition Stadium (Toronto, ON)	P paved oval	short track	Rex White	Lee Petty	Report
32	July 19	War Memorial Stadium (Buffalo, New York) (Buffalo, NY)	D dirt oval	short track	Rex White	Jim Reed	
33	July 25	Monroe County Fairgrounds (Rochester, NY)	D dirt oval	short track	Rex White	Cotton Owens	
34	July 26	Wall Township Speedway (Wall Township, NJ)	P paved oval	short track	Rex White	Jim Reed	
35	August 2	Bridgehampton Raceway (Sag Harbor, NY)	P paved road course	road course	Jack Smith	Jack Smith	
36	August 7	Columbia Speedway (Cayce, SC)	D dirt oval	short track	Speedy Thompson	Speedy Thompson	
37	August 10	Nashville Fairgrounds Speedway (Nashville, TN)	P paved oval	short track	Rex White	Joe Weatherly	
38	August 17	Asheville Weaverville Speedway (Weaverville, NC)	D dirt oval	short track	Jimmy Massey	Fireball Roberts	
39	August 22	Bowman Gray Stadium (Winston-Salem, NC)	P paved oval	short track	George Dunn	Lee Petty	
40	August 23	Rambi Raceway (Myrtle Beach, SC)	P paved oval	short track	Speedy Thompson	Bob Welborn	
41	September 1	Darlington Raceway (Darlington, SC)	P paved oval	intermediate	Eddie Pagan	Fireball Roberts	Report
42	September 5	Southern States Fairgrounds (Charlotte, NC)	D dirt oval	short track	Lee Petty	Buck Baker	
43	September 7	Fairgrounds Raceway (Birmingham, AL)	P paved oval	short track	Cotton Owens	Fireball Roberts	
44	September 7	California State Fairgrounds (Sacramento, CA)	D dirt oval	intermediate	Parnelli Jones	Parnelli Jones	
45	September 12	Gastonia Fairgrounds (Gastonia, NC)	D dirt oval	short track	Tiny Lund	Buck Baker	
46	September 14	Richmond Raceway (Richmond, VA)	P paved oval	short track	Speedy Thompson	Speedy Thompson	
47	September 28	Orange Speedway (Hillsborough, NC)	D dirt oval	short track	Tiny Lund	Joe Eubanks	
48	October 5	Salisbury Super Speedway (Salisbury, NC)	D dirt oval	short track	Gober Sosebee	Lee Petty	
49	October 12	Martinsville Speedway (Manassas, VA)	D dirt oval	short track	Glen Wood	Fireball Roberts	
50	October 19	North Wilkesboro Speedway (North Wilkesboro, NC)	P paved oval	short track	Glen Wood	Junior Johnson	Report
51	October 26	Lakewood Speedway (Atlanta, GA)	D dirt oval	intermediate	Glen Wood	Junior Johnson	

== Driver Standings ==
The top 50 drivers in the end of season standings:

No	Driver	Points	Starts	Poles	Wins	Top 5s	Top 10s	Laps	Laps Led	$ Earnings
1	Lee Petty	12,232	50	4	7	28	43	9,315	532	26,565
2	Buck Baker	11,588	44	3	3	23	35	7,846	363	25,840
3	Speedy Thompson	8,792	37	7	4	18	23	6,536	291	15,215
4	Shorty Rollins	8,124	29	0	1	12	22	5,324	98	13,398
5	Jack Smith	7,666	39	4	2	15	21	5,978	380	12,633
6	L. D. Austin	6,972	46	0	0	0	10	7,217	0	6,246
7	Rex White	6,552	22	7	2	13	17	3,993	471	12,232
8	Junior Johnson	6,380	27	0	6	12	16	4,244	315	13,808
9	Eddie Pagan	4,910	27	2	0	11	18	4,232	57	7,472
10	Jim Reed	4,762	17	2	4	10	12	3,693	692	9,644
11	Fireball Roberts	4,420	10	0	6	8	9	2,491	875	32,218
12	Bobby Keck	4,240	30	0	0	0	7	4,660	0	3,458
13	Herman Beam	4,224	20	0	0	0	1	3,821	0	2,598
14	Tootle Estes	4,048	11	0	0	0	4	2,202	0	2,508
15	Clarence DeZalia	3,448	27	0	0	0	6	4,382	0	3,003
16	Doug Cox	3,736	14	0	0	3	9	2,479	0	3,403
17	Cotton Owens	3,716	29	2	1	8	17	3,894	240	6,579
18	Marvin Panch	3,424	11	2	0	5	5	1,833	157	4,114
19	Billy Rafter	2,916	19	0	0	1	8	3,160	0	2,799
20	Curtis Turner	2,856	17	1	3	8	10	3,068	827	10,029
21	Lloyd Dane	2,844	5	0	0	1	2	1,084	0	2,490
22	Bob Duell	2,740	7	1	0	3	6	1,273	0	2,415
23	Jimmy Thompson	2,540	8	0	0	2	3	1,300	0	3,275
24	Fred Harb	2,484	25	0	0	4	7	3,971	0	3,315
25	Tiny Lund	2,436	22	2	0	4	7	3,506	14	3,155
26	Bill Poor	2,292	24	0	0	1	7	4,047	0	3,115
27	Gene White	2,040	9	0	0	0	2	1,641	0	1,400
28	Joe Weatherly	2,032	15	1	1	5	7	2,815	104	6,330
29	Johnny Mackison	1,680	11	0	0	2	3	1,423	0	1,255
30	Jim Parsley	1,488	10	0	0	0	4	1,720	0	1,135
31	Al White	1,464	9	0	0	0	1	1,483	0	920
32	Jimmy Massey	1,300	9	1	0	1	3	1,612	0	1,625
33	Parnelli Jones	1,140	3	2	1	1	1	587	147	1,010
34	Joe Eubanks	1,120	7	0	1	2	3	956	38	2,070
35	Brownie King	1,116	24	0	0	0	5	4,245	0	3,205
36	G. C. Spencer	1,040	1	0	0	0	0	343	0	315
37	Richard Petty	1,016	9	0	0	0	1	977	0	760
38	Billy Carden	1,012	13	0	0	0	2	1,469	0	1,215
39	Elmo Langley	980	9	0	0	1	3	1,240	0	1,090
40	Buzz Woodward	964	9	0	0	0	2	1,695	0	1,195
41	Possum Jones	960	11	1	0	1	3	1,870	28	1,790
42	Jim Paschal	928	6	1	1	2	4	1,288	150	1,670
43	Chuck Hanson	916	7	0	0	0	1	1,011	0	580
44	Eddie Gray	910	3	0	1	1	1	437	43	3,375
45	Peck Peckham	868	11	0	0	0	0	1,263	0	835
46	Lenny Page	836	8	0	0	0	2	901	0	760
47	Bob Keefe	782	2	0	0	1	2	276	0	925
48	R.L. Combs	760	9	0	0	0	1	1,062	0	805
49	Volney Schulze	680	7	0	0	0	0	845	0	490
50	Dean Layfield	664	7	0	0	0	0	701	0	370
