= Eddie Gray (racing driver) =

American racing driver (1920–1969)

- Born: February 4, 1920; Gardena, California, U.S.
- Died: October 25, 1969 (aged 49)
- Cause of death: Heart attack
- Achievements: NASCAR Pacific Coast Late Model Division Champion (1958, 1961, 1962)
- Awards: West Coast Stock Car Hall of Fame (2002 - Inaugural Class)

NASCAR Cup Series career
- 22 races run over 9 years
- Best finish: 44th (1958)
- First race: 1954 Race 1 (Lancaster)
- Last race: 1966 Motor Trend 500 (Riverside)
- First win: 1958 Crown America 500 (Riverside)
- Last win: 1961 Race 45 (Sacramento)
Wins	Top tens	Poles
4	9	1

ARCA Menards Series West career
- 88 races run over 11 years
- Best finish: 1st (1958, 1961, 1962)
- First race: 1956 Gardena 200 (Gardena)
- Last race: 1966 Race 11 (Gardena)
- First win: 1958 Gardena 150 (Gardena)
- Last win: 1963 Race 9 (Manzanita)
Wins	Top tens	Poles
20	61	14
- Statistics up to date as of September 19, 2026.

Eddie Gray (February 4, 1920 – October 25, 1969) was an American race car driver from Gardena, California. He became champion of a predecessor of the NASCAR Winston West Series in 1958, 1961 and 1962. The series was then known as NASCAR Pacific Coast Late Model (PCLM).

Gray also participated in NASCAR Grand National races on the West Coast, capturing four wins, including two as an owner-driver. On May 31, 1958, Gray won a 500-mile race at Riverside International Raceway, the first NASCAR event held at the track. He also ran the 1958 Southern 500 at Darlington Raceway and attempted to make the 1960 Daytona 500.

Gray raced Jalopies with the California Jalopy Association (CJA) and became one of the top short track Stock Car racers in Southern California at tracks like Saugus Speedway (where he was a track champion), Ascot Park and Orange Show Speedway, earning the nickname "Steady" Eddie Gray.

== Death ==
Suffered a severe heart attack while driving in the Permatex 100 race for Late Model Sportsman cars at Riverside International Raceway in January 1969 and died nine months later while undergoing heart surgery. He is buried at Rose Hills Memorial Park in Whittier, California.

== Awards ==
Gray was inducted in the West Coast Stock Car Hall of Fame in its first class (2002).

Achievements
Preceded by Lloyd Dane	NASCAR Pacific Coast Late Model Series champion 1958	Succeeded by Bob Ross
Preceded by Marvin Porter	NASCAR Pacific Coast Late Model Series champion 1961-1962	Succeeded by Ron Hornaday, Sr.
