= Jim Parsley =

American race car driver (1927-2014)

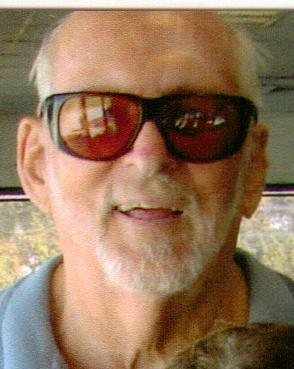
- Parsley in 2011
- Born: May 4, 1927; Wheaton, Maryland, U.S.
- Died: January 30, 2014 (aged 86); New Smyrna Beach, Florida, U.S.
- Cause of death: Alzheimer's disease

NASCAR Cup Series career
- 11 races run over 2 years
- Best finish: 30th (1958)
- First race: 1958 Race No. 13 (Old Dominion)
- Last race: 1959 Race No. 11 (Reading)
Wins	Top tens	Poles
0	5	0

NASCAR Convertible Division career
- 1 race run over 1 year
- First race: 1959 Race No. 5 (Marlboro)
Wins	Top tens	Poles
0	0	0

James Roger Parsley (May 4, 1927 – January 30, 2014) was an American stock car racing driver. Born in Wheaton, Maryland, he competed in the NASCAR Grand National Series in his career, earning five top-ten finishes in eleven races.

== Career ==
Parsley's NASCAR debut came in 1958, when he finished 30th in points. and had four top ten finishes He debuted at Old Dominion Speedway in Manassas, Virginia, where he finished 15th. He would struggle in his next three starts but hit his stride late in the year, earning three straight top-tens and four top-tens overall: sixth place at Richmond International Speedway and at Rochester, eighth place at New Bradford, and ninth place at Reading Fairgrounds. Parsley's final finish came in 1959, when he competed at Reading again where he finished eighth. Parsley also competed in a NASCAR Convertible Division event at Marlboro Motor Raceway in Upper Marlboro, Maryland, and two USAC/ARCO Stock Car races at Willimas Grove Speedway in Mechanicsville, Pennsylvania.

Parsley's final attempt at competition was on 13 February 1960 when he entered a 1957 Chevy in the 500 mile Modified Sportsman Event at Daytona International Speedway (now notorious for having the largest crash in NASCAR history). While nearing the conclusion of lap 1, Dick Foley's car slid sideways through the final turn. He was able to straighten out and continue the race but some thirty plus cars stacked up behind him. Over 20 cars were eliminated, including Parsley.

== Personal life ==
Jim Parsley was one of six children born to Rodger and Elysie (Nichols) Parsley in Layhill, Maryland. After high school he went to work for the U.S. Post Office and was named to the team of five who were the first to experiment with the newly invented 5 digit zip code machine. He joined the U.S. Army in 1945 and served in World War II where he was stationed in Paris as a message center clerk. During the war he received an Army of Occupation Medal and World War II Victory Medal.

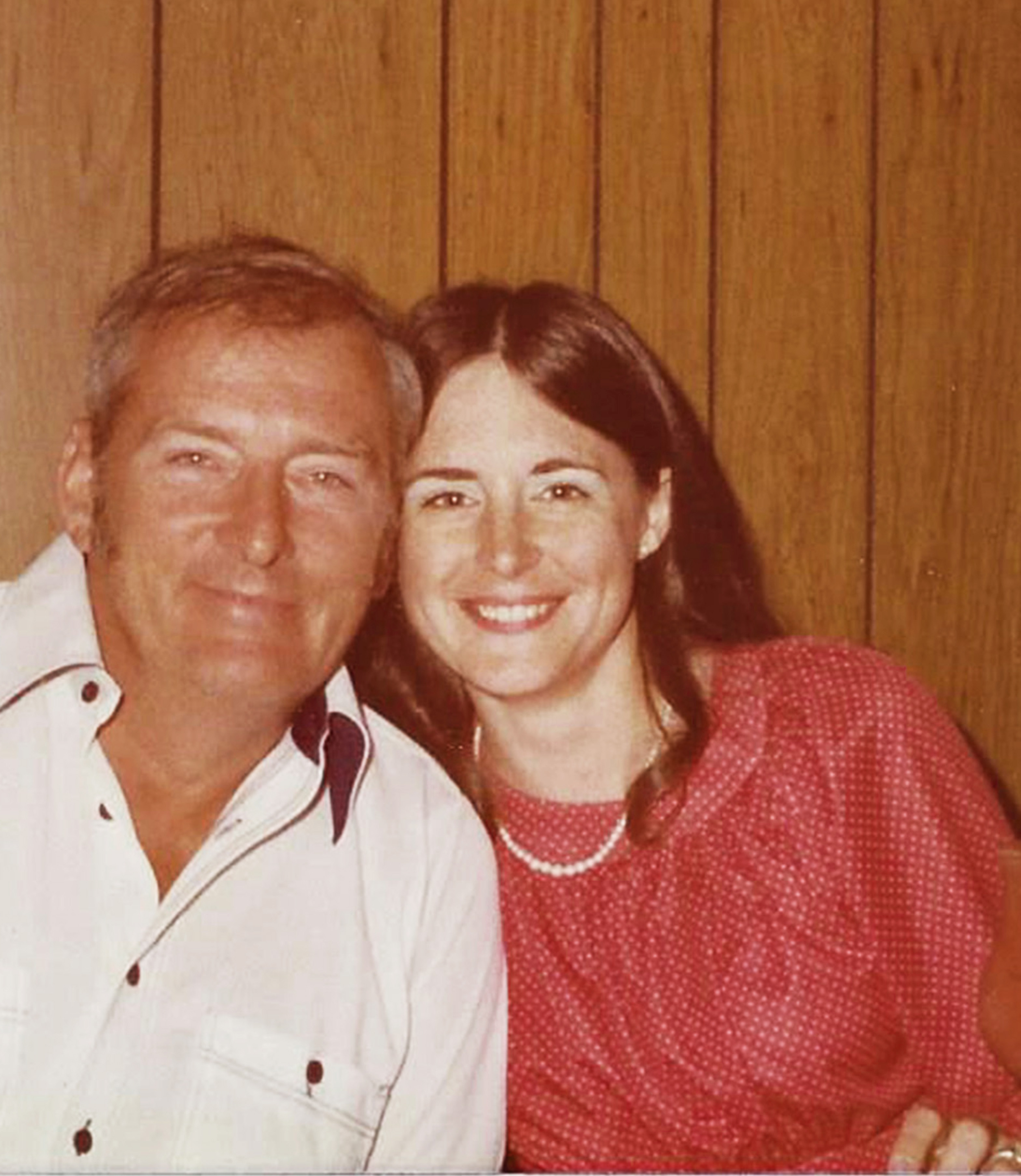
Jim Parsley and daughter Becky circa 1969

Becoming an entrepreneur, Parsley operated several businesses in and around College Park, Maryland.

Following his racing career, Parsley retired to New Smyrna Beach, Florida, where he operated Causeway Marina. He died on January 30, 2014, after a brief illness with Alzheimer's.

== Motorsports career results ==
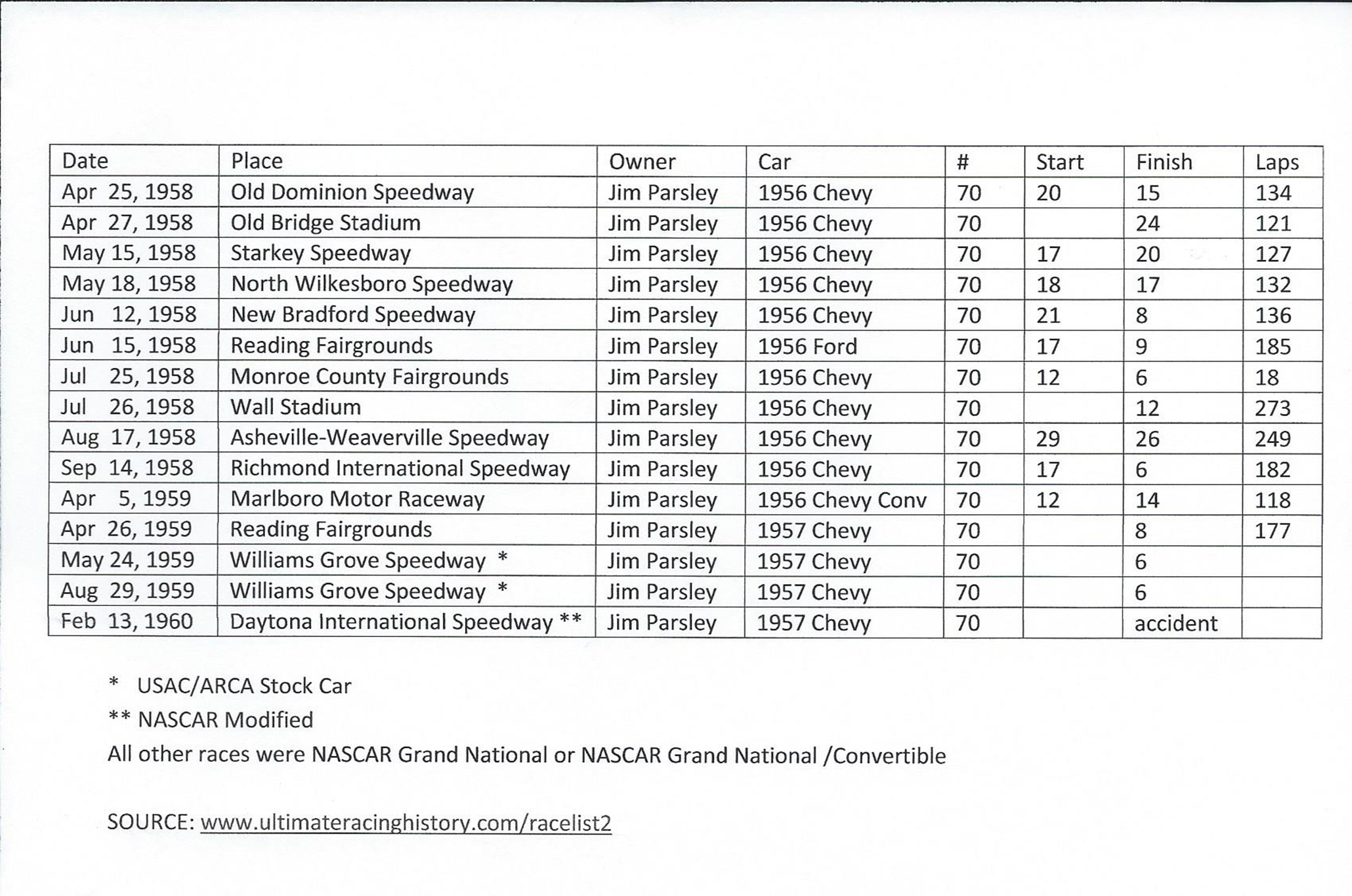
