= 1957 Chevrolet =

Make of US auto

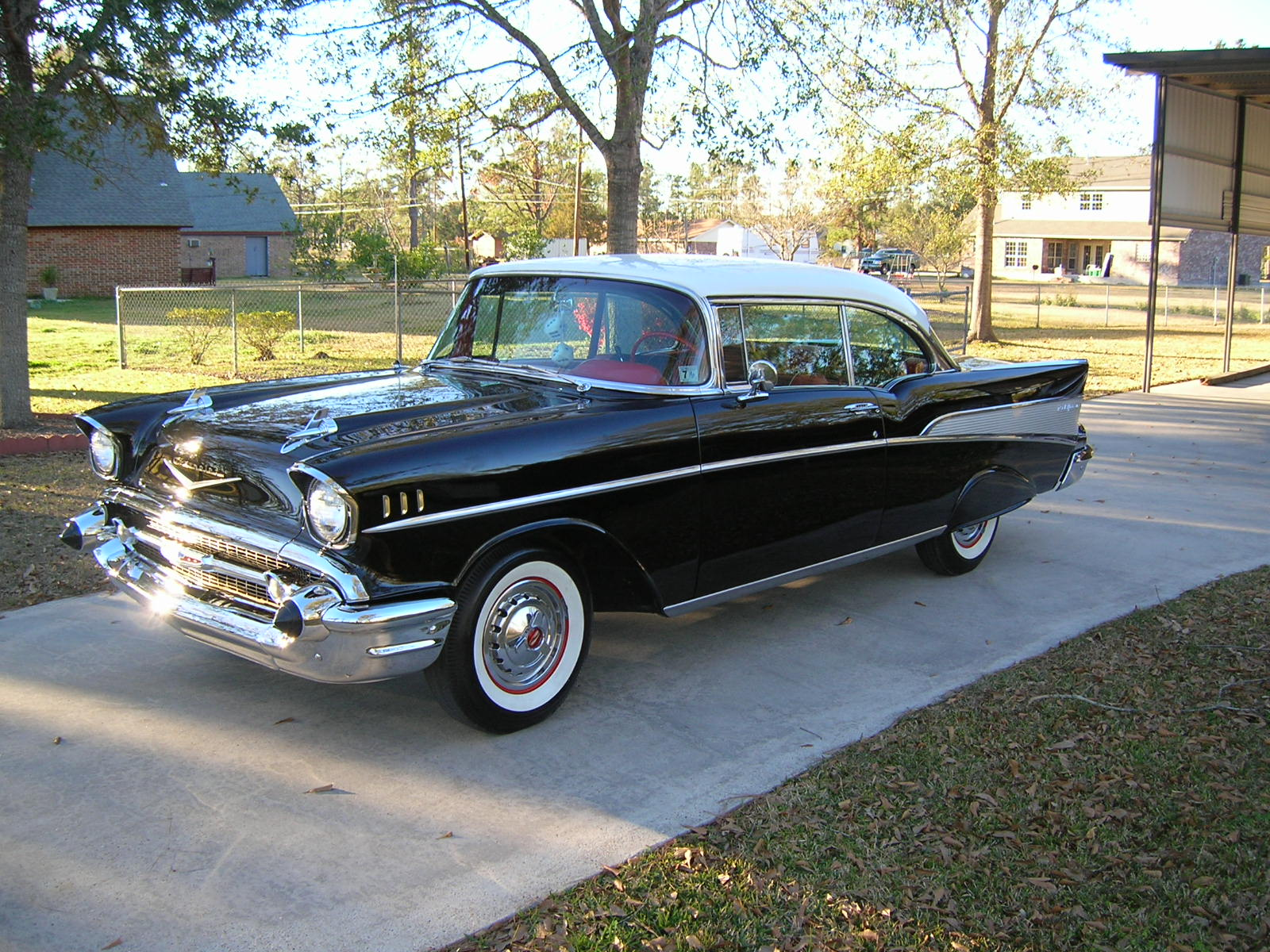
- 1957 Chevrolet Bel Air Sport Coupé

Overview
- Manufacturer: Chevrolet (General Motors)
- Production: 1956–1957
- Designer: Clare MacKichan (1954)

Body and chassis
- Body style: 2-door sedan 2-door hardtop 4-door sedan 4-door hardtop 2-door convertible 2-door station wagon 4-door station wagon 2-door sedan delivery

Powertrain
- Engine: 235.5 cu in (3,859 cc) Blue Flame I6; 265 cu in (4,340 cc) V8; 283 cu in (4,640 cc) V8
- Transmission: 3-speed manual Powerglide auto Turboglide auto

The 1957 Chevrolet is a car that was introduced by Chevrolet in September 1956 for the 1957 model year. It was available in three series models: the upscale Bel Air, the mid-range Two-Ten, and the economy/fleet model One-Fifty. A two-door station wagon, the Nomad, was produced as a Bel Air model. An upscale trim option called the Delray was available for Two-Ten 2-door sedans. It is a popular and sought after classic car. These vehicles are often restored to their original condition and sometimes modified. The car's image has been frequently used in toys, graphics, music, movies, and television. The '57 Chevy, as it is often known, is an auto icon.

== History ==
Initially, General Motors executives wanted an entirely new car for 1957, but production delays necessitated the 1955–56 design for one more year. Ed Cole, chief engineer for Chevrolet, dictated a series of changes that significantly increased the cost of the car. These changes included a new dashboard, sealed cowl, and the relocation of air ducts to the headlight pods, which resulted in the distinctive chrome headlight that helped make the 1957 Chevrolet a classic. Fourteen-inch wheels replaced the fifteen-inch wheels from previous years to give the car a lower stance, and a wide grille was used to give the car a wider look from the front. The now famous 1957 Chevrolet tailfins were designed to duplicate the wide look in the rear. Bel Air models, though maintaining the same chassis, powertrains, and body, were given upscale gold trim: the mesh grille insert and front fender chevrons, as well as the "Chevrolet" script on the hood and trunk, were all rendered in anodized gold. The 1957 Chevrolets did not have an oil pressure gauge or a voltmeter. The base engine was an inline 6-cylinder called the Blue Flame Six. The engine was smoother running than the V-8. Carburetion came from a single one-barrel carburetor.

=== "Tri-Five" 1955–1957 V8 ===
The 1955 model year Chevrolet introduced its now-famous small-block V-8 — the first V-8 available in a Chevrolet since 1918. It has a displacement of 265 cu in (4,340 cc). Prior to 1955, Chevrolet offered a 235 cu in (3,850 cc) displacement in-line 6-cylinder engine only. The 1955 model, like its engine, was all new. The "shoebox" design, so named because it was the first Chevrolet to feature streamlined rear fenders, was a watershed for Chevrolet. The lightweight car, coupled with a powerful overhead valve V-8, became a showroom draw, but also thrust the company into the arena of competitive motorsports. 1955 Chevrolets went on to dominate drag racing and became a formidable force in circle track racing. In 1956, the design was lengthened somewhat in front and given a more squarish treatment; under the hood, engine power increased and a Chevrolet Corvette engine was available for the first time in a full-size passenger car. In 1957, the V-shaped trim on the tail fins was filled with a ribbed aluminum insert exclusive to the Bel Air's upgraded trim level. The fuel-injected engine represented the first time that an internal combustion gasoline engine in a passenger car reached an advertised one horsepower for each cubic inch benchmark, although the Chrysler 300B beat that by a year in its 355-horsepower, 354 c.i.d dual-carburetored engine, and the Alfa Romeo Giulietta Sprint was introduced a year earlier than that (1954), with a 79 cubic inch (1290cc) engine that produced 80 hp. In NASCAR racing, the 283 with its increased horsepower, gave the 1957 a dramatic advantage over the smaller 265 V8 the 1955 and 1956 cars had. NASCAR held the competition, especially the 1955-57 Chevrolet to a cubic inch restriction because of all the races the 1957s were winning. This restriction stayed with the 1955–57 until they were grandfathered out of the lower NASCAR divisions in the 1970s as the 1957 was still beating virtually all in their class.

=== Body styles ===
Body choices for 1957 included:

- 2- and 4-door sedans (identified by the pillars between door windows)
- 2-door Sport Coupe (a two-door hardtop - the car has no pillar between the front and back window when the window lowered)
- Sport Sedan (a 4-door hardtop)
- 2-door Utility Sedan, a two-door sedan with a package shelf instead of a rear seat
- Delray Club Coupe, which was a Two-Ten model 2-door sedan with a deluxe interior
- The top-of-the-line 2-door Bel Air Nomad station wagon with a sloped pillar behind the hardtop door and sliding windows at the rear seat, unique ribbed roof sheetmetal and lower roofline height mimicking the hardtop models.
- The basic 2-door Handyman station wagon with an upright sedan B-pillar and a C-pillar, where the four-door wagons have one, available only in One-Fifty and Two-Ten trim levels.
- 4-door, six-passenger station wagon (referred to as the Townsman; available in both the Two-Ten and Bel Air series)
- 4-door, nine-passenger station wagon (referred to as the Beauville; only available in the Two-Ten series)
- Convertible

Unlike most competitors, the Chevrolet 4-door hardtop featured a reinforced rear roof structure that gave the car added rigidity and a unique appearance in silhouette. The 1957 Chevrolet was called by some a "Baby Cadillac", because of many styling cues similar to Cadillacs of the time. V8-optioned cars got a large "V" under the Chevrolet script on the hood and trunk lid; the "V" was gold for the Bel Air trim level, and silver-colored chrome for the 210 and 150 trim levels.

The 2-door Bel Air Nomad station wagon had its own distinctive styling, mainly in the roof line and rear deck.

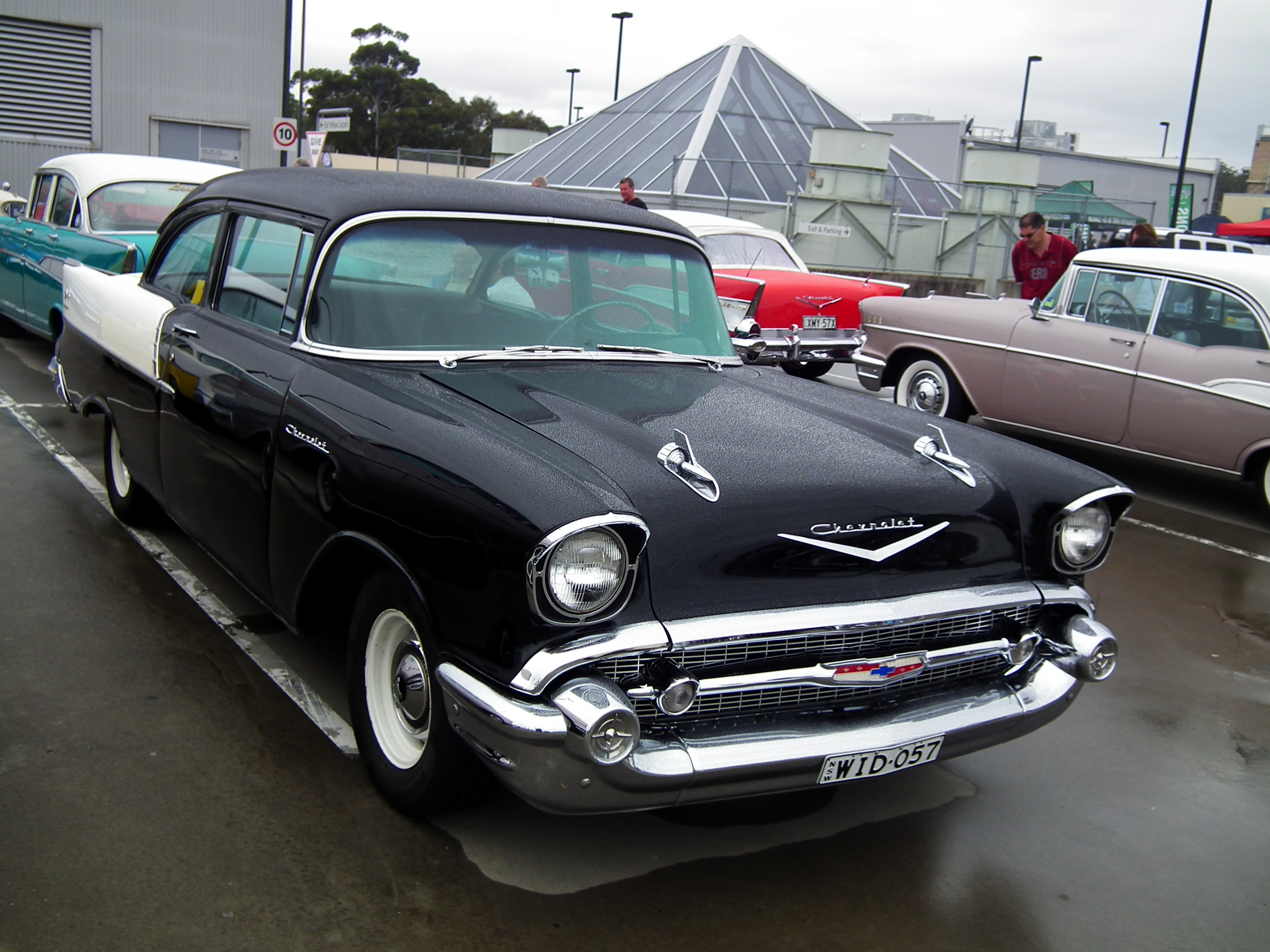
1957 Chevrolet One-Fifty 2-door Sedan

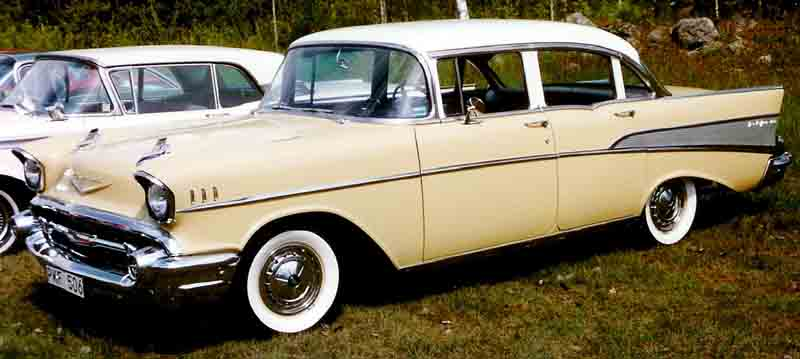
1957 Chevrolet Bel Air 4-door Sedan

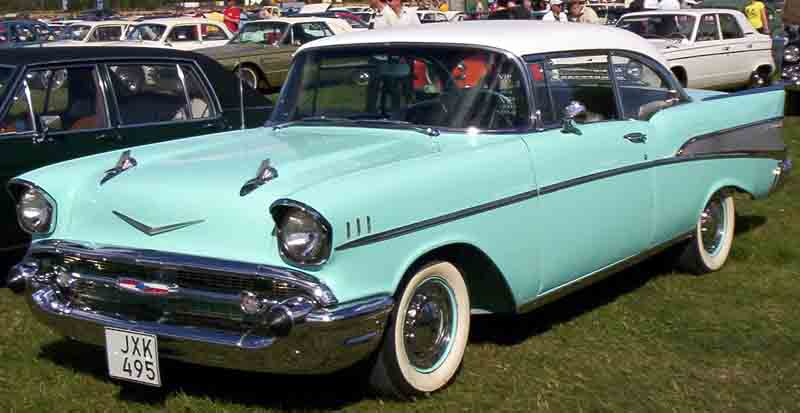
1957 Chevrolet Bel Air Sport Coupe

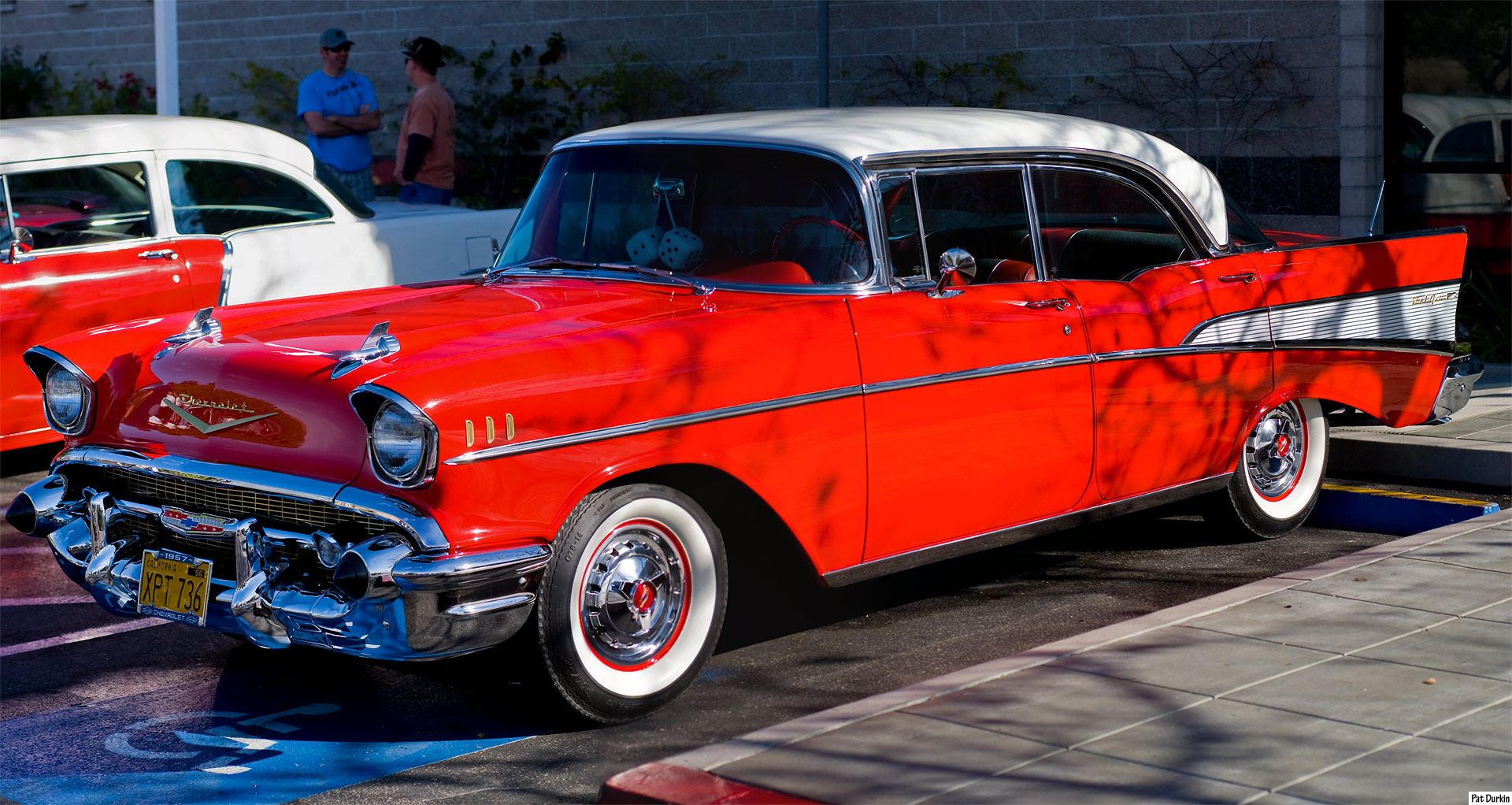
1957 Chevrolet Bel Air Sport Sedan

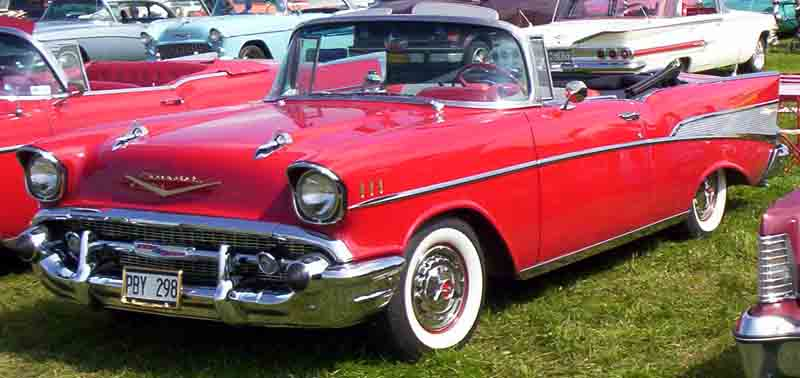
1957 Chevrolet Bel Air Convertible

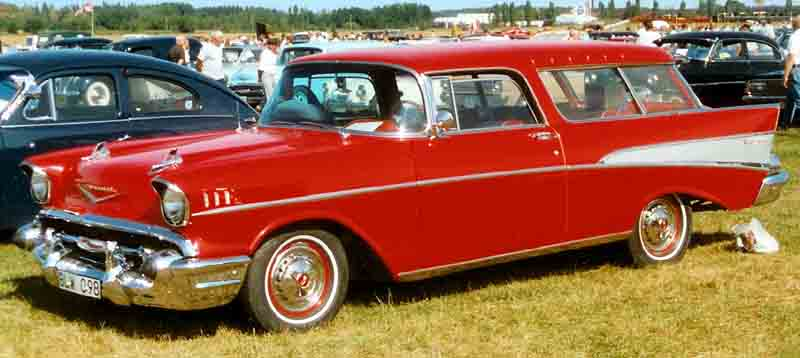
1957 Chevrolet Bel Air Nomad 2-door 6-passenger Station Wagon

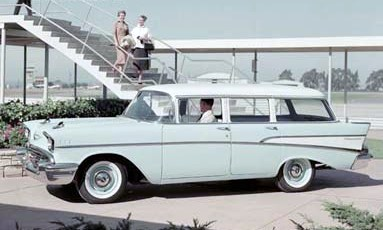
1957 Chevrolet Two-Ten Townsman 4-door 6-passenger Station Wagon

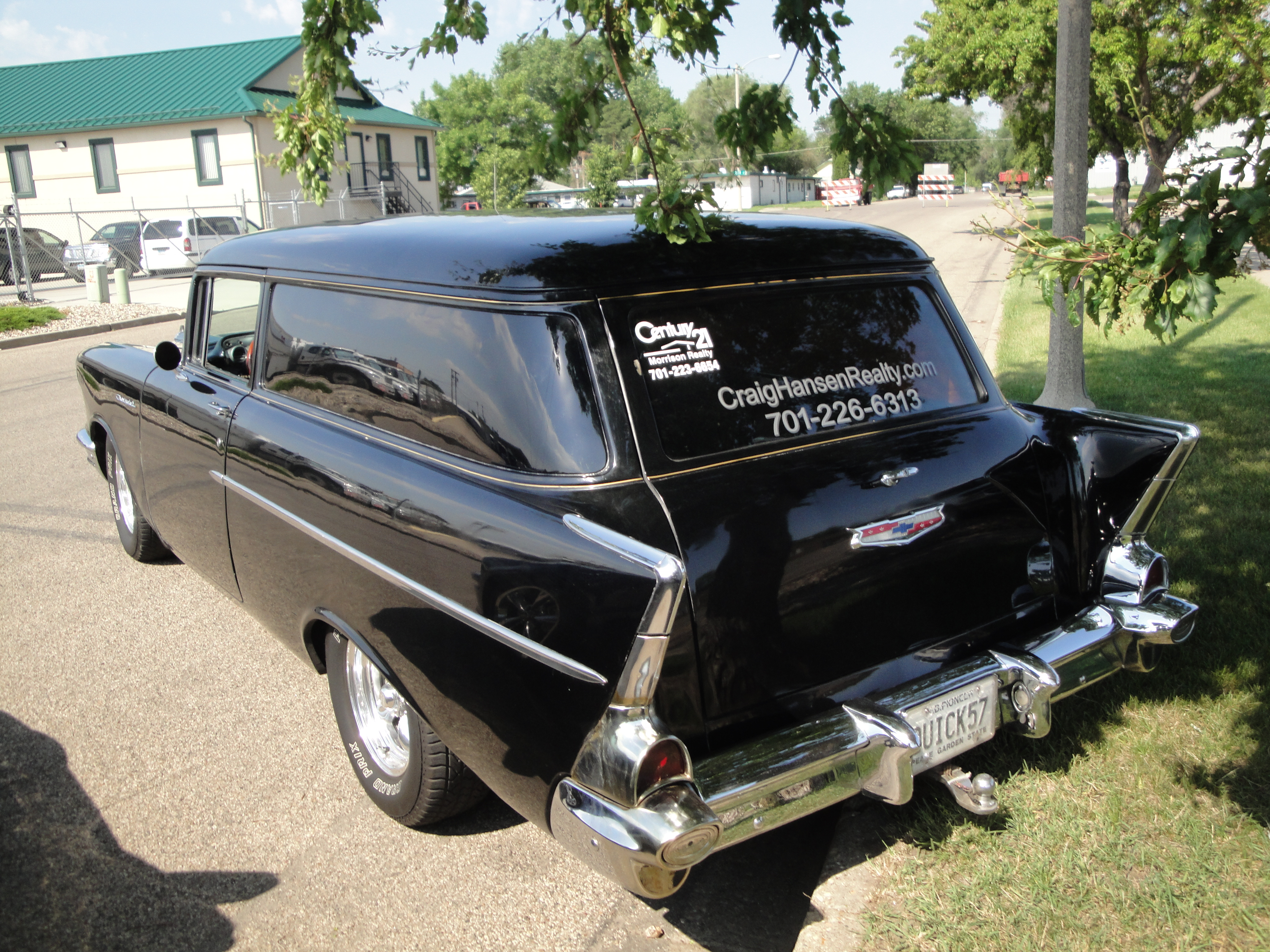
1957 Chevrolet One-Fifty Sedan Delivery (non-standard wheels)

=== Engines ===
For 1957 there were four standard engine options, a 235.5 cu in (3,859 cc) inline 6-cylinder producing 140 hp (104 kW), a 265 cu in (4,340 cc) V8 "Turbo-Fire" producing 162 hp (121 kW), and two 283 cu in (4,640 cc) V8s: a "Turbo-Fire" twin-barrel carburetor producing 185 hp (138 kW) and a "Super "Turbo-Fire" four-barrel carburetor developing 220 hp (164 kW). To help mechanics distinguish the 265 cu in V8 engine from the red 1956 and 1955 265 cu in V8 engines and the orange 1957 283 cu in V8s, the early 1957 265 cu in V8 engines with manual transmissions were painted a bright yellow-green chartreuse. After November 1956, the 1957 265 cu in V8 engines were painted the same orange as the 1957 283 cu in V8s.

Another optional engine was offered with two four barrel carburetors, the legendary "Duntov" cam and solid lifters. This engine produced 270 hp. 1957 was the first year that Chevrolet ever offered fuel injection as an option. A 283 cu in (4,640 cc) engine fitted with solid lifters, the "Duntov" cam and fuel injection was rated at 283 hp (211 kW) and cost $500. This was the first time in history that a General Motors vehicle achieved 1-hp-per-cu-in in a production vehicle. Fuel injection continued as an option throughout the early 1960s. However, most mechanics of the time didn't have the experience to keep the units running properly. This prompted most buyers to opt for conventional carburetion.

In a 1957 survey of owners, Popular Mechanics reported that 16.9% of owners complained about the fuel economy, while 34.4% wanted fuel injection.

=== Options ===
There were many options available, most of which were designed to make the car more comfortable and luxurious. Air conditioning was offered though rarely ordered, as was a padded dashboard. Power steering and power brakes were available, as well as a signal-seeking AM radio and power antenna. Power windows and power seats were also available. A rear speaker could be purchased which required a separate volume knob to be installed in the dashboard, beside the radio — this rear speaker was touted as providing "surround" sound. An "Autronic eye" was offered; it was a device that bolted onto the dashboard and sensed the light from oncoming traffic, dimming the headlights automatically. One unique option was an electronic shaver, connected to the dashboard. The 1957 radio used tubes that required only 12 volts of plate voltage and a transistor for the output stage. This lowered the power drain on the battery to an insignificant amount when the engine was off. Playing the radio with conventional tubes for extended periods occasionally drained the battery to the extent that it could not start the car. The clock was electrically self-wound and moving the hands to correct the time resulted in actually regulating the going rate. After a few corrections, the clock was remarkably accurate.

Another dashboard-mounted item was the traffic-light viewer, a ribbed plastic visor that was installed just above the speedometer. Because the roof extends so far forward of the driver, it is hard to see overhead traffic lights. The traffic light viewer captured the reflection of overhead traffic lights so that the driver didn't have to lean forward to see past the edge of the roof. A/C was also an option.

In 1957, Chevrolet started to add safety features such as "crash proof door locks" (first added in 1956), padded dash boards, safety-styled steering wheel with a recessed hub (though not as much as Ford's), seat belts (also first in 1956) and shoulder harnesses. However, unlike Ford, Chevrolet did not promote these safety features heavily.

1957 was also Chevrolet's first offering of a turbine transmission, known as the Turboglide. It was a design concept that Buick had developed with their Dynaflow transmission. However, due to a reliability reputation caused by its complexity, most automatic transmission buyers shunned the Turboglide in favor of the two-speed Powerglide that had been offered since 1950. At the time the Turboglide casing was the largest cast aluminum component ever put into mass production, but it never recovered from the reputation in 1957 and the option was discontinued in 1961. Manual transmissions were limited to three-speed, column-shifted units (with synchromesh in second and third gear only). The Powerglide's shifter went P N D L R while the Turboglide's was P R N D Hr (although the 'Hr' was changed early in the production series to 'Gr'-Grade Retarder because of drivers' mistaken belief that 'Hr' meant High Range instead of the correct Hill Retarder.) . An overdrive unit was available as an option on the three-speed manually-shifted transmission cars. Starting at the end of May 1957, a four-speed manual transmission was also offered at an over-the-counter price of $188.00 but no installation kit (shifter and linkage) was ever offered by Chevrolet and, while an owner may have jury-rigged an installation in their own car, there is no evidence that any dealer ever actually installed the transmission in any car in 1957. A 1957 Chevrolet equipped with this transmission mated to the 270 horsepower engine and limited-slip differential was the one to beat on the drag strip and street into the early 1960s.

=== Post-production popularity ===
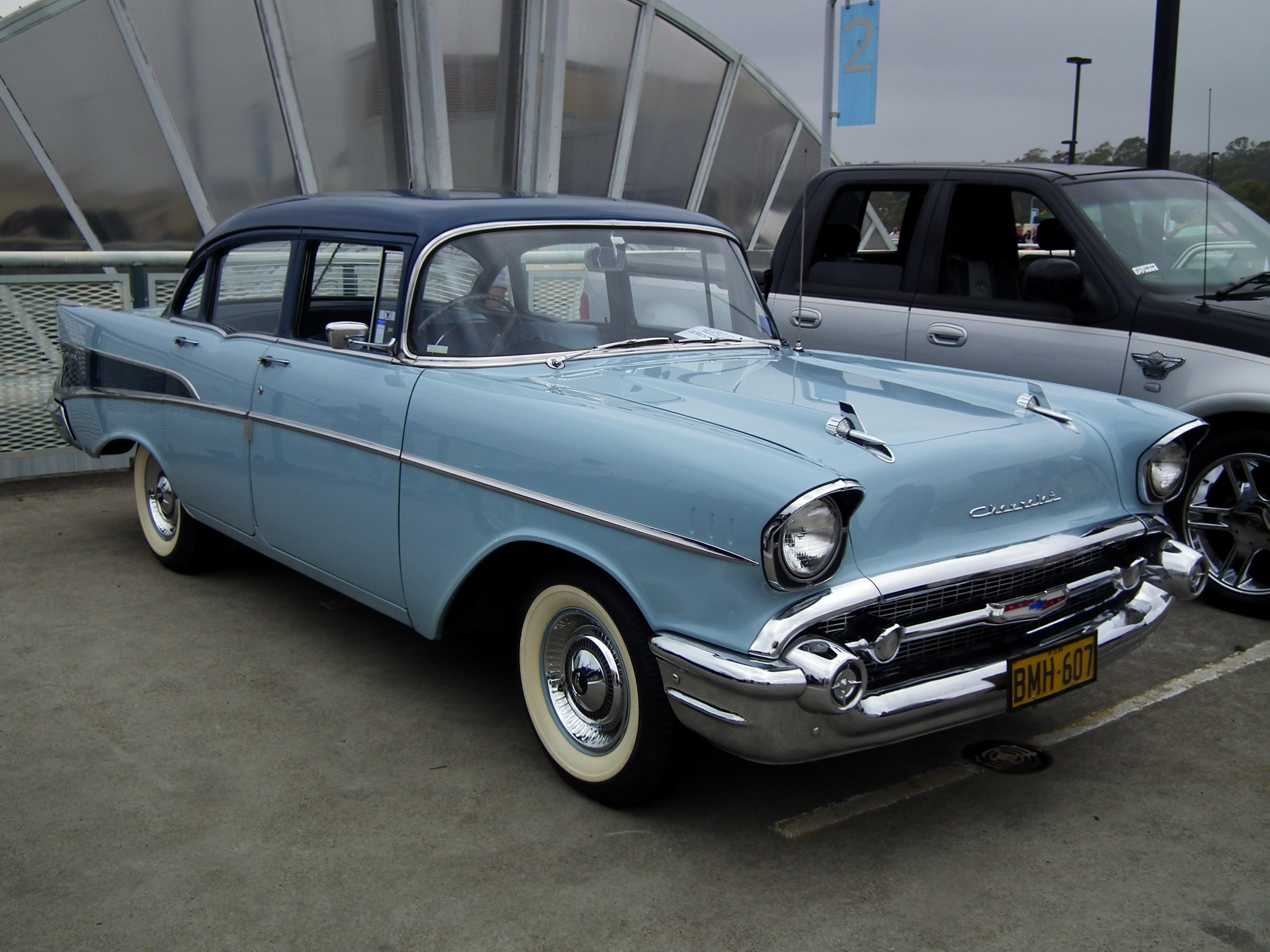
1957 Chevrolet Two-Ten 4-door Sedan

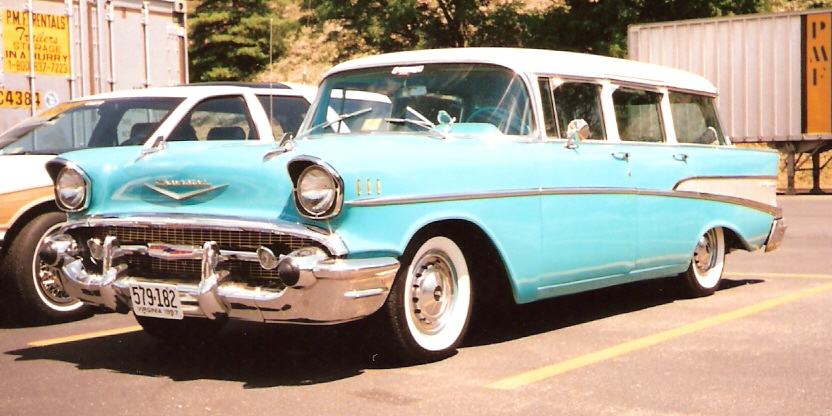
1957 Chevrolet Bel Air Townsman 4-door Station Wagon

From a numbers standpoint, the 1957 Chevrolet wasn't as popular as General Motors had hoped. Despite its popularity, rival Ford outsold Chevrolet for the 1957 model year for the first time since 1935. The main cause of the sales shift to Ford was that the 1957 Chevrolet had tubeless tires, the first car to have them. This scared away sales to Ford as many people did not initially trust the new tubeless design. Also Ford's introduction of an all-new body styling that was longer, lower, and wider than the previous year's offerings helped Ford sales.

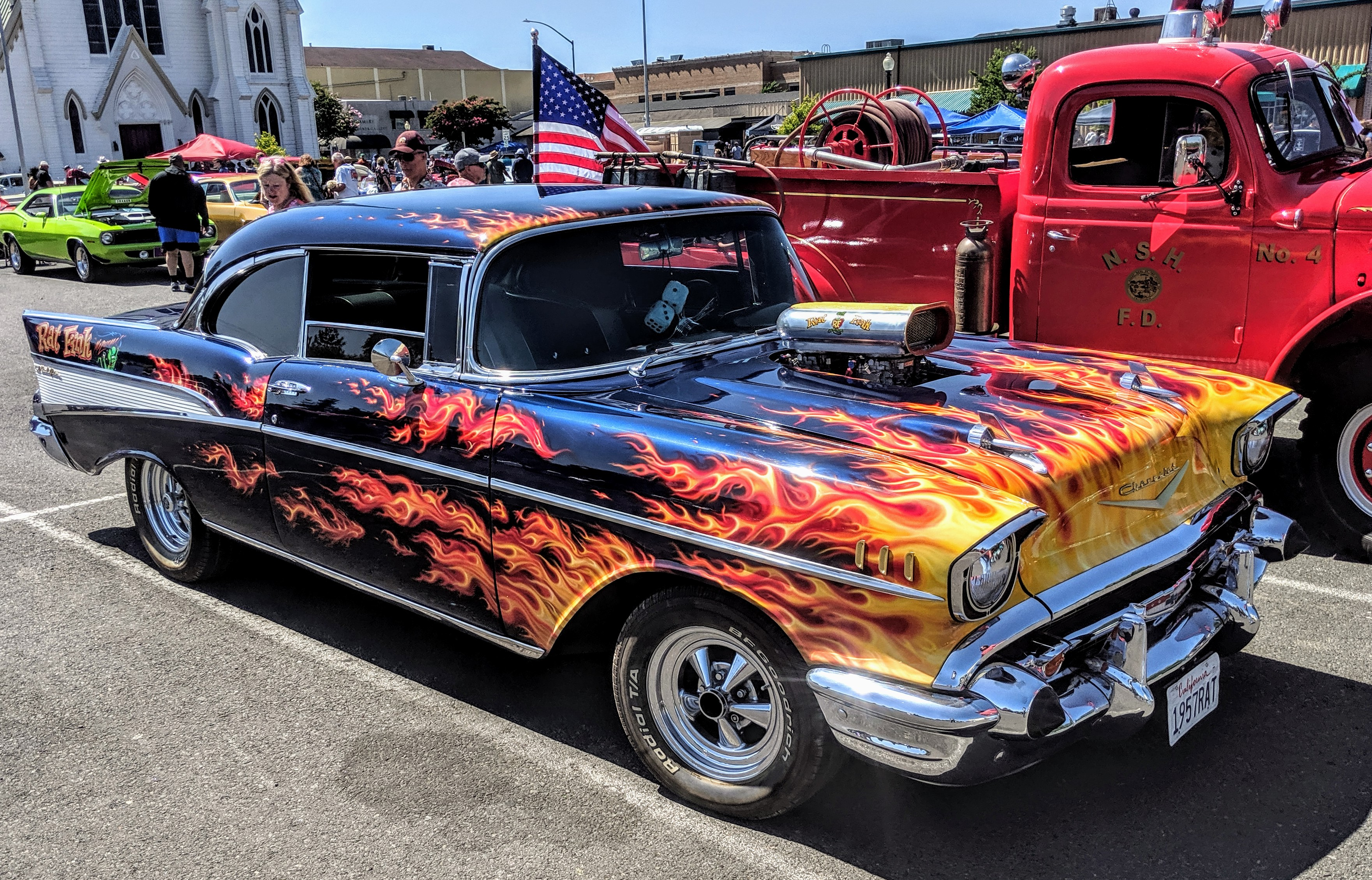
1957 Chevrolet hot rod with flamed paint job

However, the 1957 Ford — with the exception of the rare retractable hardtop model — is not nearly as prized by collectors today as the 1957 Chevrolet. Throughout the 1960s and 1970s, the 1957 Chevrolet was a popular used car and highly prized "street machine" or hot rod in 1957 terms. It was the final year of the "shoebox" Chevrolet, as 1958 saw the introduction of a much larger and heavier "X" framed Chevrolet. The ideal size of the 1957, combined with its relatively light weight compared to newer full-sized cars, made it a favorite among drag racers. The engine bay was big enough to fit GM's big-block engines, first introduced in 1958 and popularized in the 1960s by the Beach Boys in the song "409". The relatively simple mechanical attributes of the car made it easy to maintain, customize, and upgrade with components such as disc brakes and air conditioning.

The big block, however, was not what put the 1957 on the map on the street scene; it was the introduction of the low-priced small-block, 365-horsepower 327 in 1962 that was the blockbuster that made both the 1955 and 1957 Chevrolet able to beat the Ford hotrods with their flathead V8s. This was a major turning point in American hot rodding: Chevrolet had claimed the street scene from Ford. The 1957 Chevrolet also won 49 Grand National "cup" NASCAR races (the most of any car in NASCAR history), won the Southern 500 (in 1957, 1958, and 1959); becoming the only car to win the 500 three times. The earliest victory for a 1957 Chevrolet in a titled NASCAR Grand National Series race was the 1957 Virginia 500.

The 1957 also won 26 NASCAR "convertible races," more than any make, and won all three possible driver's championships. The first in convertible class and winning car in the 1959 Daytona 500 was a 1957 driven by Joe Lee Johnson. The convertibles started on the outside row and were approximately ten miles an hour slower than the hardtops and sedans because of their aerodynamics. No one figured that a convertible would win the race and they didn't but wonder who was driving the top finishing convertible.

The 283 engine placed from the factory behind the centerline of the front wheels made the 1957 a superior handling car on the short tracks and the dirt tracks as well. This mechanical advantage, coupled with the high revving and reliable 283, earned the 1957 the nickname "king of the short tracks" With the fuel injected 283, the One-Fifty model two door sedan version, called the "black widow," was the first car outlawed (and quickly so) by NASCAR as it proved almost unbeatable on virtually all the NASCAR tracks in early 1957. After the 1957 was grandfathered out from the now "cup" division in 1960 and relegated to the lower local track sportsman divisions, they were still the car to beat for years. The 1957s subsequently were used up in stock car racing at a very high rate. Surprisingly enough, the 1957 Chevrolet also won a disproportionate amount of demolition derbies as well: With the radiator set back from the grille, the car was difficult to disable. The additional advantage of having the last double lined trunk, coupled with a strong frame, made it a surprisingly common winner in the demolition derbies during the late 1960s and early 1970s. By the 1970s, the 1957 Chevrolet became a collector car.

Companies such as Danchuk Manufacturing, Inc. and Classic Chevy Club International began selling reproduction and restoration parts. In the early 1990s, the value of a meticulously restored 1957 Chevrolet convertible was as high as $100,000. Although those peaks gave way significantly after 1992, the 1957 Chevrolet has held its value and is now poised to exceed the previous peak.

Modern customizers are creating modern fiberglass and all-steel reproductions.

== See also ==
- Chevrolet Bel Air
