= 1959 Southern 500 =

Auto race held at Darlington Raceway in 1959

Race details
- Race 36 of 44 in the 1959 NASCAR Grand National Series season
- 1959 Southern 500 program cover
- Date: September 7, 1959
- Location: Darlington Raceway, Darlington, South Carolina
- Course: Permanent racing facility
- Course length: 1.366 miles (2.221 km)
- Distance: 400 laps, 500 mi (800 km)
- Weather: Very hot with temperatures of 88 °F (31 °C); wind speeds of 8.9 miles per hour (14.3 km/h)
- Average speed: 111.836 miles per hour (179.983 km/h)
- Attendance: 78,000

Pole position
Driver	Fireball Roberts	Jim Stephens
- Time: 16.002 seconds

Most laps led
Driver	Jim Reed	Jim Reed
- Laps: 152

Winner
No. 7	Jim Reed	Jim Reed

The 1959 Southern 500, the 10th running of the event, was a NASCAR Grand National Series event that was held on September 7, 1959, at Darlington Raceway in Darlington, South Carolina.

== Background ==
Darlington Raceway, nicknamed by many NASCAR fans and drivers as "The Lady in Black" or "The Track Too Tough to Tame" and advertised as a "NASCAR Tradition", is a race track built for NASCAR racing located near Darlington, South Carolina. It is of a unique, somewhat egg-shaped design, an oval with the ends of very different configurations, a condition which supposedly arose from the proximity of one end of the track to a minnow pond the owner refused to relocate. This situation makes it very challenging for the crews to set up their cars' handling in a way that will be effective at both ends.

The track is a four-turn 1.366 miles (2.198 km) oval. The track's first two turns are banked at twenty-five degrees, while the final two turns are banked two degrees lower at twenty-three degrees. The front stretch (the location of the finish line) and the back stretch is banked at six degrees. Darlington Raceway can seat up to 60,000 people.

Darlington has something of a legendary quality among drivers and older fans; this is probably due to its long track length relative to other NASCAR speedways of its era and hence the first venue where many of them became cognizant of the truly high speeds that stock cars could achieve on a long track. The track allegedly earned the moniker The Lady in Black because the night before the race the track maintenance crew would cover the entire track with fresh asphalt sealant, in the early years of the speedway, thus making the racing surface dark black. Darlington is also known as "The Track Too Tough to Tame" because drivers can run lap after lap without a problem and then bounce off of the wall the following lap. Racers will frequently explain that they have to race the racetrack, not their competition. Drivers hitting the wall are considered to have received their "Darlington Stripe" thanks to the missing paint on the right side of the car.

== Race report ==
It took four hours and twenty-eight minutes for the race to reach its conclusion; Jim Reed defeated Bob Burdick by more than two laps; he actually won in a 1959 Chevrolet Impala that was listed as a 1957 Chevrolet. Reed's vehicle took its third and final win at the Southern 500. The newer and faster 1959 Chevrolet vehicles lead a total of 154 laps while the older 1957 Chevrolet vehicles only lead 57 laps. Seventy-eight thousand people attended this live race.

Notable speeds for this race were: 111.836 miles per hour (179.983 km/h) as the average speed and 123.734 miles per hour (199.131 km/h) per hour as the pole position speed. Richard Petty would lead his first career laps from lap 93 to lap 99. The Goodyear would get its first victory since re-entering racing. Goodyear Eagle tires currently have the monopoly on all NASCAR racing series. Total winnings for this race were $51,990 ($574,205 when adjusted for inflation). Neil Castles' car had a problem early in the race, spent most of the day fixing it, and then came back out and was on track at the finish albeit 272 laps down. Events like that occurred quite frequently if the team thought they could pick up a few points.

Drivers points were unimportant in the 1950s regardless of how many races the drivers ran. It wasn't until Winston came on the scene in the 1970s that the driver's championship amounted to much more than a nice trophy. Castles clearly didn't get any extra money for going back out, since he's shown as getting the same $150 as all the other drivers who failed to finish the race.

This race was the first time Coca-Cola sponsored a car, Joe Weatherly, who finished 43rd. It was also probably one of, if not the only time ever that a race track advertised its grand opening by sponsoring a car in one of NASCAR's biggest races. Atlanta International Raceway sponsored Jack Smith's car with their opening date, November 22. Interestingly, though, there weren't any races scheduled at the track until July 1960.

Joe Caspolitch's ride was owned by the city of Florence, South Carolina. The city government bought the ride from Lee Petty in order to field Caspolitch in the race. Since then, not a single branch of the American government (federal, municipal, or state government) has claimed ownership or has attempted to claim ownership of a NASCAR vehicle.

While Richard Petty and Buddy Baker got their first superspeedway action during this race in 1959, this would be the first major race in NASCAR history where a person from the Northern United States would win over a resident of the Southeastern United States. Charley Cregar, Bud Crothers, and Johnny Patterson would make their final NASCAR Cup Series appearance at this event.

Bud Crothers would qualify the race in 32nd place and would end up with a 21st-place finish after finishing 318 laps. This was the only Grand National Series race for Bill Champion; where he would finish 12th after qualifying 25th. Mario Rossi, Shorty Johns and Roy Burdick were crew chiefs in attendance for this event.

Scenes from this race were used in the 1960 film Thunder in Carolina, starring Rory Calhoun and Alan Hale, Jr.

=== Qualifying ===
Grid	No.	Driver	Manufacturer	Speed	Qualifying time	Owner
1	3	Fireball Roberts	'59 Pontiac	123.724	16.002	Jim Stephens
2	10	Elmo Langley	'59 Buick	123.387	16.047	Ratus Walters
3	22	Speedy Thompson	'59 Chevrolet	123.387	16.061	W.J. Ridgeway
4	4	Rex White	'59 Chevrolet	122.836	16.119	Rex White
5	73	Bob Burdick	'59 Ford Thunderbird	122.714	16.135	Roy Burdick
6	43	Richard Petty	'59 Plymouth	123.134	16.080	Petty Enterprises
7	93	Banjo Matthews	'59 Ford Thunderbird	122.026	16.226	Banjo Matthews
8	12	Joe Weatherly	'59 Ford Thunderbird	121.988	16.231	Doc White
9	42	Lee Petty	'59 Plymouth	121.405	16.309	Petty Enterprises
10	47	Jack Smith	'59 Chevrolet	121.071	16.354	Jack Smith

Withdrew from race: Billy Cash (#89), Junior Johnson (#11)

== Finishing order ==
Section reference:

1. Jim Reed
2. Bob Burdick
3. Bobby Johns
4. Richard Petty
5. Tommy Irwin (racing driver)
6. Jim Paschal
7. Fireball Roberts
8. Larry Frank
9. Buck Baker
10. Jimmy Thompson
11. Shep Langdon
12. Bill Champion
13. Joe Caspolitch
14. Speedy Thompson
15. Charlie Cregar
16. Herman Beam
17. Rex White
18. L.D. Austin
19. Cotton Owens
20. Lee Petty
21. Bud Crothers
22. Al White
23. G.C. Spencer
24. Earl Balmer
25. Dick Blackwell
26. Tiny Lund
27. Cale Yarborough
28. Jack Smith
29. Marvin Panch
30. Johnny Patterson
31. Banjo Matthews
32. George Green
33. Roy Tyner
34. Bob Duell
35. Bob Welborn
36. Tom Pistone
37. Neil Castles
38. Possum Jones
39. Lennie Page
40. Buddy Baker
41. Bob Perry
42. Joe Lee Johnson
43. Joe Weatherly
44. Dick Joslin
45. Elmo Langley
46. Joe Eubanks
47. Marvin Porter
48. Elmo Henderson
49. Larry Flynn
50. Carl Burris

== Timeline ==
Section reference:

- Start of race: Speedy Thompson officially had the pole position to start the event.
- Lap 2: Carl Burris' engine suddenly become faulty.
- Lap 3: Fireball Roberts took over the lead from Speedy Thompson.
- Lap 11: The rear end of Larry Flynn's vehicle came off in an unsafe manner.
- Lap 16: Elmo Henderson's engine stopped working properly.
- Lap 26: The pistons on Joe Eubanks' vehicle started acting strangely.
- Lap 41: Elmo Langley's engine stopped working on this lap.
- Lap 45: Banjo Matthews took over the lead from Fireball Roberts.
- Lap 54: Oil pressure issues managed to ruin Joe Weatherly's day.
- Lap 58: Transmission problems managed to defeat Joe Lee Johnson's chances of victory.
- Lap 62: Cotton Owens took over the lead from Banjo Matthews.
- Lap 63: A busted engine ended Bob Perry's day on the track.
- Lap 64: Engine issues took Buddy Baker out of the race.
- Lap 71: Lennie Page's race ended in misery after his vehicle's engine stopped working.
- Lap 74: Possum Jones just could not race anymore after his vehicle's brakes gave out.
- Lap 86: Bobby Johns took over the lead from Cotton Owens.
- Lap 93: Richard Petty took over the lead from Bobby Johns.
- Lap 100: Banjo Matthews took over the lead from Richard Petty.
- Lap 130: Bob Welborn had a terminal crash.
- Lap 138: Bobby Johns took over the lead from Banjo Matthews.
- Lap 178: Banjo Matthews had a terminal crash.
- Lap 188: Jim Reed took over the lead from Bobby Johns.
- Lap 225: Dick Blackwell had a terminal crash.
- Lap 234: One of the pistons in Earl Balmer's vehicle stopped working properly.
- Lap 239: Bob Burdick took over the lead from Jim Reed.
- Lap 264: Jim Reed took over the lead from Bob Burdick.
- Lap 272: G.C. Spencer's vehicle ran out of batteries while he was racing.
- Lap 326: Rex White's driveshaft stopped working properly, forcing him to retire from the race.
- Lap 333: One of the springs on Speedy Thompson's vehicle became faulty, bringing an end to his performance in this race.
- Finish: Jim Reed was officially declared the winner of the event.

Preceded by 1958	Southern 500 races 1959	Succeeded by 1960
