= McCormick Field Raceway =

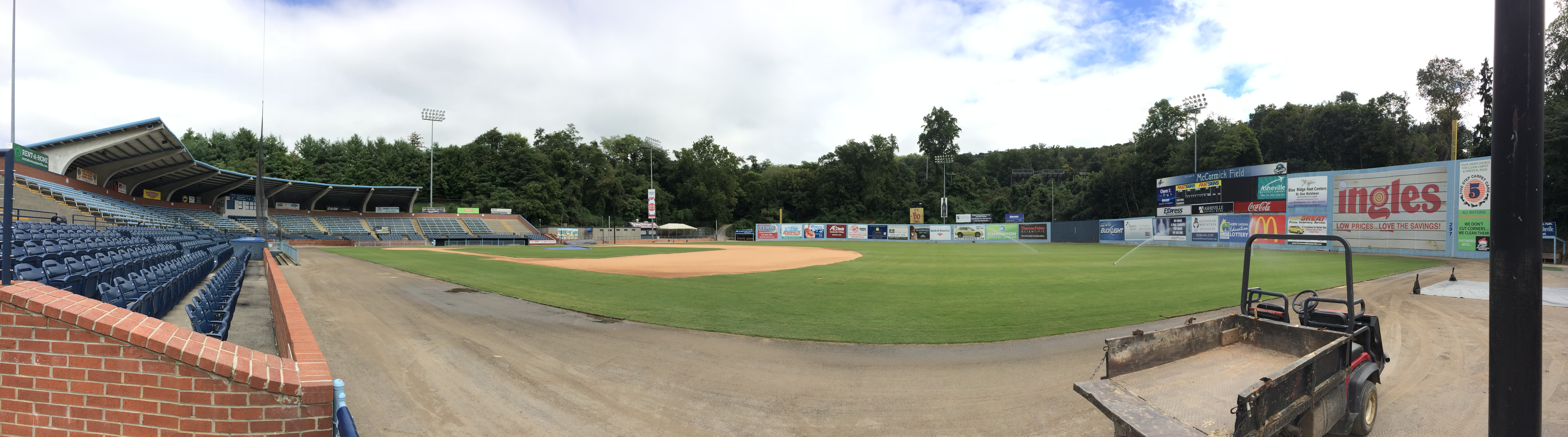
- McCormick Field stadium and the now defunct McCormick Field Raceway
- Location: 30 Buchanan Pl, Asheville, NC 28801
- Coordinates: 35°35′14″N 82°32′57″W
- Surface: Asphalt
- Length: 0.25 mi (0.40 km)
- Turns: 4
- Banking: 0 Degrees

McCormick Field Raceway was a quarter-mile oval track constructed in 1956 built around the McCormick Field in Asheville, North Carolina after the town had lost its minor league team. The track hosted weekly stock car races, a pair of NASCAR Convertible Series (now NASCAR Xfinity Series), and one Grand National (now NASCAR Cup Series) race.

== History ==
=== Grand National ===
NASCAR's top series only raced once at McCormick Field. A likely reason for the abbreviated run was that it was built around the tight confines of a baseball field, and drivers had to pay particularly close attention. Lee Petty was running near the front during a heat race at the track when a bump from Cotton Owens sent him into the first-base dugout. The team repaired Petty's car in time for the main event and he finished one lap down in fourth place. Jim Paschal won driving a car owned by Julien Petty, Lee's brother.

=== Convertible Division ===
Curtis Turner won the 1956 and 1957 NASCAR Convertible Division races which were the only two races held at the track.
