= Jim Reed (racing driver) =

American racing driver (1926–2019)

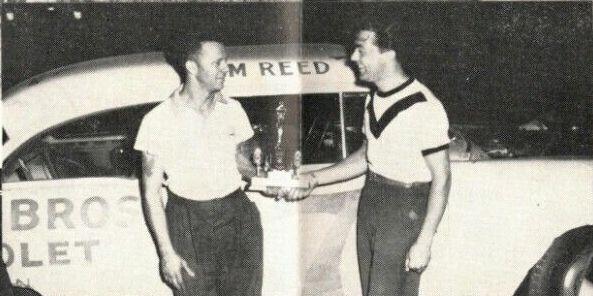
- Jim Reed
- Born: February 21, 1926; Marion, Illinois, U.S.
- Died: June 29, 2019 (aged 93); Peekskill, New York, U.S.

NASCAR Cup Series career
- 106 races run over 13 years
- Best finish: 9th (1959)
- First race: 1951 Race 19 (Altamont)
- Last race: 1963 Race 35 (Old Bridge)
- First win: 1958 Race No. 14 (Old Bridge)
- Last win: 1959 Southern 500 (Darlington)
Wins	Top tens	Poles
7	47	5

Jim Reed (February 21, 1926 – June 29, 2019) was an American NASCAR Grand National driver.

== Career ==
Reed completed 16,335 laps in the Grand National Series (and led 1,472 of them) – the equivalent of 14,017.3 miles (22,558.7 km) from his beginnings 1951 to his final NASCAR season as a driver in 1963. His total career earnings are $16,299 ($171,405.24 when adjusted for inflation). Reed's biggest win came in the 1959 Southern 500 driving a 1957 Chevrolet Bel Air. Reed finished the highest in championship standings in 1959 (ninth place overall) and the lowest in 1963 being 139th place overall for the year. His average career start was 12th and his average career finish was 16th. A wreck while driving a Ford late in the 1963 Grand National season caused a broken vertebra; Reed eventually retired from NASCAR. At Heidelberg Raceway, Reed won a race that took place on July 21, 1959, on a ¼-mile dirt track.

Reed performed the best at short tracks and restrictor plate tracks; finishing 11th on average while finishing in 34th on average while driving on tri-oval intermediate tracks.

Reed also had eleven career wins in what is now the ARCA Menards Series West, as well as sixty wins and fix consecutive championships in the NASCAR Short Track Division.

== Later life and death ==
In 1965, Reed left the motorsports scene to start a truck dealership. While it started out as a GMC dealership, the business eventually moved on to selling Mitsubishi and UD trucks. Sales have mostly been either the first or second best in the Peekskill, New York region.

Reed died in his sleep on June 29, 2019, succumbing to a heart attack.
