= HomeTrust Bancshares =

North Carolina-based bank holding company

HomeTrust Bancshares Inc.
- Company type: Public
- Traded as: NYSE: HTB; Russell 2000 Component
- Industry: Banking
- Founded: 1926; 100 years ago
- Headquarters: Asheville, North Carolina

HomeTrust Bancshares Inc. is an Asheville, North Carolina–based bank holding company with $4.3 billion in assets and 33 branches in North and South Carolina, Georgia and Tennessee. It is the parent of seven community banks—HomeTrust Bank, Tryon Federal Bank, Shelby Savings Bank, Home Savings Bank, Industrial Federal Bank, Cherryville Federal Bank and Rutherford County Bank.

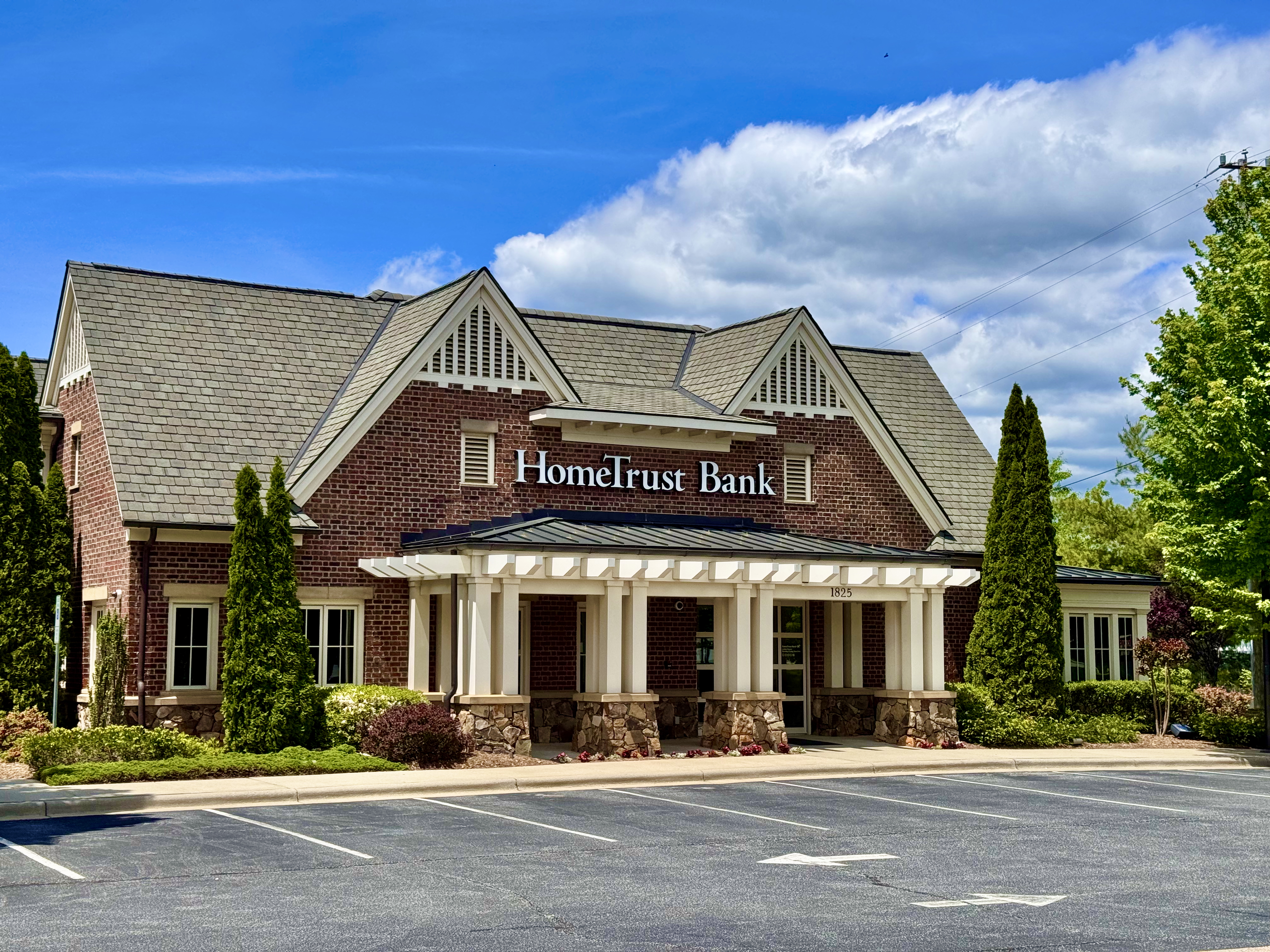
A HomeTrust Bank in South Asheville

== History ==
HomeTrust Bank was founded in 1926 as Clyde Building and Loan, in Clyde, North Carolina. Later, the name changed to Clyde Savings and Loan Association, and then Clyde Savings Bank. Ed Broadwell joined the bank in 1965 at age 27, the youngest bank president in the state. The bank had $10 million in assets, and five people worked there. In 1973, the bank bought a block in Asheville and built a new three-story headquarters. Dana Stonestreet, who took over after Broadwell's retirement, said, "They hired more people to open that office than they had in the whole history of the bank." Clyde Savings Bank expanded into Buncombe County and Henderson County. In 2003, the name changed to HomeTrust Bank. By 2010 HomeTrust had two locations in Haywood County, five in Buncombe County and one in Henderson County in North Carolina. In 2013, Broadwell retired after 48 years.

Tryon Federal Bank, started in 1935, had two offices in Polk County, and Shelby Savings Bank, started in 1905, had two offices in Cleveland County.

Rutherford County Bank opened its first office in Forest City in May 2007, at which time it also became part of HomeTrust Banking Partnership.

Home Savings Bank of Rockingham County began June 9, 1909. As of its 100th anniversary in 2009, it had two offices in Eden and one in Reidsville.

Industrial Federal Bank started in 1929. On January 31, 2010, Industrial Federal Bank, with three locations in Davidson County, became part of the HomeTrust Banking Partnership. This gave the partnership 19 offices, and with $1.6 billion in assets, the partnership was the largest mutual bank in the state and the second-largest in the southeastern United States.

Cherryville Federal Savings and Loan in Cherryville joined the partnership later in 2010, adding one location.

As of January 2012, when HomeTrust Bank and its partners announced conversion from mutual to stock. HomeTrust Banking Partnership, if considered one bank, would have been the 11th largest in North Carolina. The formation of HomeTrust Bancshares was also announced at the time. In July 2012 HomeTrust had 20 branches and $1.6 billion in assets.

In 2013, HomeTrust made its first acquisition outside North Carolina, BankGreenville Financial Corp. of Greenville, South Carolina, in a $7.8 million deal.

On January 23, 2014, HomeTrust announced the acquisition of Jefferson Bancshares Inc. of eastern Tennessee, started in 1963, with over $498 million in assets and 12 offices, in a deal worth $51.2 million.

On June 10, 2014, HomeTrust announced it would buy ten Bank of America branches in southwestern Virginia with $504 million in deposits.

In 2016, HomeTrust announced a $31.8 million deal to buy Kingsport, Tennessee–based TriSummit Bank.

On July 26, 2022, HomeTrust said it was buying Quantum Capital Corp., with three branches of Quantum National bank in the Atlanta area and $600 million in assets, in a deal worth $67.6 million. The deal was completed in February 2023.
