= 1958 Southern 500 =

Auto race held at Darlington Raceway in 1958

Race details
- Race 41 of 51 in the 1958 NASCAR Grand National Series season
- 1958 Southern 500 program cover
- Date: September 1, 1958
- Location: Darlington Raceway, Darlington, South Carolina
- Course: Permanent racing facility
- Course length: 1.375 miles (2.221 km)
- Distance: 364 laps, 500.5 mi (805.476 km)
- Weather: Extremely hot with temperatures reaching up to 91.9 °F (33.3 °C); wind speeds reaching up to 11.62 miles per hour (18.70 km/h)
- Average speed: 102.585 miles per hour (165.095 km/h)
- Attendance: 80,000

Pole position
- Driver: Eddie Pagan
- Time: 16.930 seconds

Most laps led
- Driver: Fireball Roberts
- Laps: 196

Winner
- No. 22: Fireball Roberts

The 1958 Southern 500, the 9th running of the event, was a NASCAR Grand National Series event that was held on September 1, 1958 at Darlington Raceway in Darlington, South Carolina. Contested over 364 laps on the 1.375 mile (2.221 km) speedway, it was the 41st race of the 1958 NASCAR Grand National Series season. Fireball Roberts won the race.

Ken Rush failed to qualify for the event; qualifying times were typically between 16.9 seconds and 21.2 seconds.

Eddie Pagan had a very scary crash in this race on lap 136, he hit the end of a steel guardrail and tumbled down the track embankment. Pagan escaped though with very minor injuries. Jimmy Thompson finished in 4th place while Speedy Thompson finished in 14th place.

== Race results ==
| Pos | No. | Driver | Manufacturer | Laps |
|---|---|---|---|---|
| 1 | 22 | Fireball Roberts | 1957 Chevrolet | 364 |
| 2 | 87 | Buck Baker | 1958 Chevrolet | 359 |
| 3 | 99 | Shorty Rollins | 58 Ford | 359 |
| 4 | 46 | Jimmy Thompson | 1957 Chevrolet | 358 |
| 5 | 98 | Marvin Panch | 58 Ford | 357 |
| 6 | 49 | Bob Welborn | 1957 Chevrolet | 355 |
| 7 | 40 | Rex White | 1958 Chevrolet | 348 |
| 8 | 30 | Doug Cox | 57 Ford | 348 |
| 9 | 95 | Bob Duell | 57 Ford | 346 |
| 10 | 36 | Tootle Estes | 57 Ford | 346 |

== Timeline ==
Section reference:

- Start: Joe Weatherly was leading the starting grid as the green flag was waved in the air.
- Lap 1: Bob Perry fell out with engine failure.
- Lap 2: Eddie Pagan took over the lead from Joe Weatherly.
- Lap 5: Jimmy Massey's vehicle suffered from transmission problems.
- Lap 7: Don Kimberling had a terminal crash.
- Lap 8: Harvey Hege could not get the throttle in his racing vehicle to work properly.
- Lap 15: Bob Bolheimer managed to overheat his vehicle, Cotton Owens had issues with his vehicle's pistons.
- Lap 13: Joe Eubanks took over the lead from Eddie Pagan.
- Lap 39: Curtis Turner took over the lead from Joe Eubanks.
- Lap 47: Emuanel Zervakis managed to overheat his vehicle.
- Lap 49: A troublesome piston managed to relegate Reds Kagle to the sidelines.
- Lap 61: George Dunn's vehicle developed some terminal engine problems.
- Lap 71: Larry Frank had a terminal crash.
- Lap 86: Eddie Pagan took over the lead from Curtis Turner.
- Lap 88: Speedy Thompson took over the lead from Eddie Pagan.
- Lap 92: Marvin Porter had a terminal crash.
- Lap 94: Curtis Turner took over the lead from Speedy Thompson.
- Lap 95: Jesse James Taylor had a terminal crash.
- Lap 136: Eddie Pagan had a terminal crash by hitting the end of a steel guardrail and tumbling down the track embankment.
- Lap 146: Issues with the vehicle's clutch forced Joe Eubanks to accept a miserable 35th-place finish.
- Lap 160: Eddie Gray had a terminal crash by crashing through the guardrail.
- Lap 169: Fireball Roberts took over the lead from Curtis Turner.
- Lap 210: Jack Smith had a terminal crash by flipping over the guardrail.
- Lap 226: Joe Weatherly's engine stopped working properly.
- Lap 304: Bobby Johns' engine stopped working properly.
- Lap 321: Jim Paschal's engine stopped working properly.
- Finish: Fireball Roberts was officially declared the winner of the race up 5 laps.

== Race Statistics ==
- Time of race: 4:52:44
- Average Speed: 102.585 miles per hour (165.095 km/h)
- Pole Speed: 116.952 miles per hour (188.216 km/h)
- Cautions: 6 for 28 laps
- Margin of Victory: 5 laps +
- Lead changes: 8
