= 1956 NASCAR Grand National Series =

American motorsport season

Seasons
- ← 1955 1957 →

The 1956 NASCAR Grand National (now NASCAR Cup Series) Season began on November 13, 1955, and ended on November 18, 1956.

Driver Tim Flock was the defending champion, and started off with a win at the opening Hickory Speedway. But it was Buck Baker who ultimately captured the top-ranking at the end of the season. Along with trophies, Baker also collected $34,076.35 in prize money, and finished more than 400 points ahead of his closest competitor. Baker competed in 48 races throughout the 1956 season as Speedy Thompson and Herb Thomas rounded out the top three in points by the final race.

Even though auto manufactures Chevrolet and Ford both contributed millions of dollars into their cars during the season, it was Carl Kiekhaefer's Chryslers and Dodges that dominated the season including a 16 win stretch through the summer months.

== Season summary ==
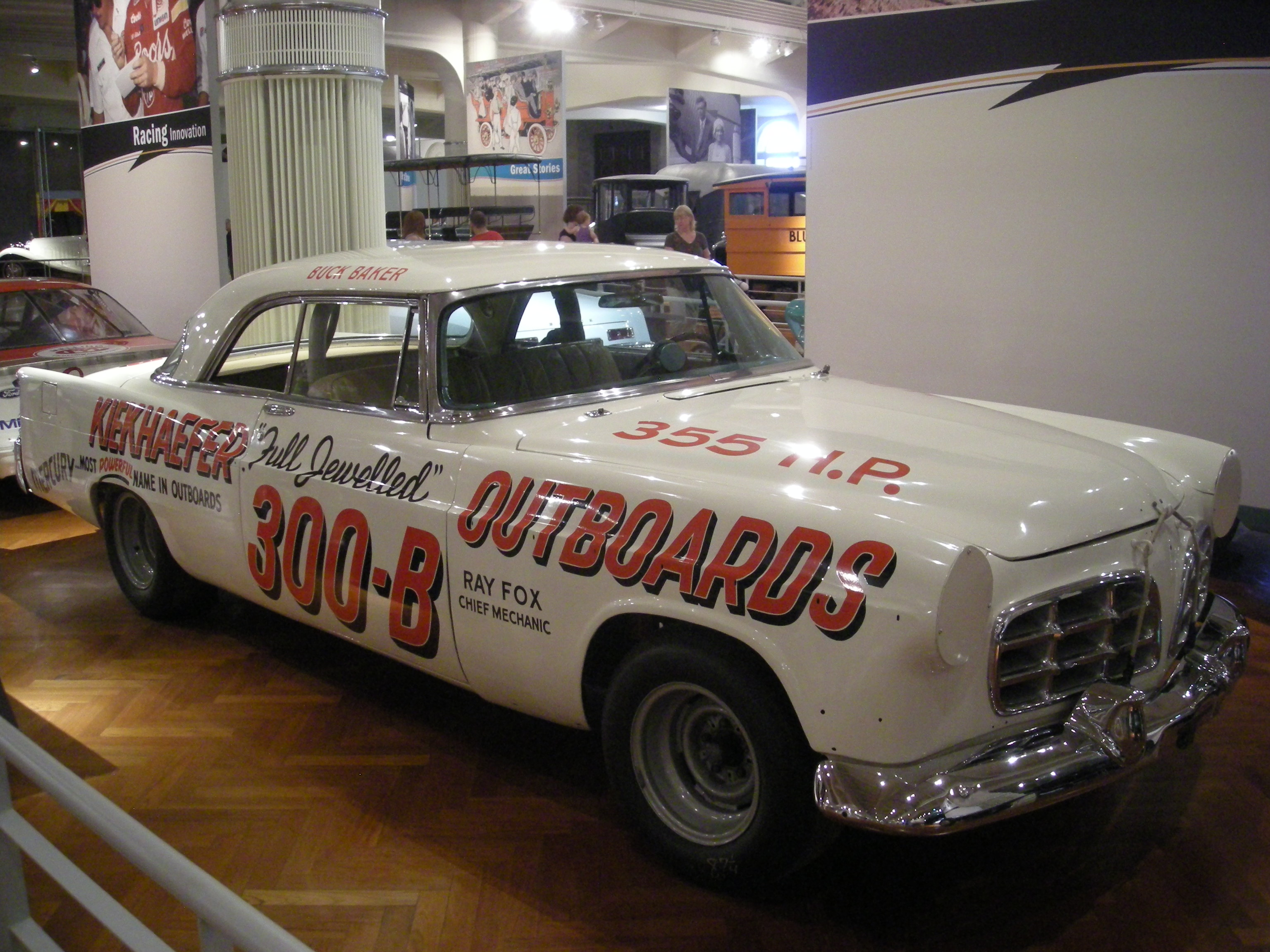
A 1956 Chrysler 300-B restored for the Henry Ford museum to replicate one of season champion Buck Baker's rides.

The season started on a somber note; as former driver Buddy Shuman died the night before the season started, in a Hickory hotel fire. The coroner reported that the mattress had been on fire, and it appeared that Shuman had attempted to escape, but broke down the bathroom door instead of the hallway. Shuman had been put in charge of the factory effort by Ford to succeed in NASCAR.

Buck Baker won the NASCAR Grand National championship with 14 wins in the 1956 race season. The season involved races on 40 dirt tracks, 3 road courses, and 2 superspeedways. More than 300 drivers competed in at least one race throughout the season With Baker and Speedy Thompson competing in 48 of the 56 races. Baker finished the season with 31 top five finishes, 39 top ten, and 12 poles.

Baker had been improving his season finishing position for a couple years; with a 4th-place finish in 1953, 3rd in 1954, and runner-up in 1955. For the 1956 season Baker joined the Carl Kiekhaefer team who already boasted Speedy Thompson and Tim Flock. The powerhouse Kiekhaefer team finished with a total of 30 races in the 56 race season, including 16 straight races by 4 different drivers during one stretch of the season. Baker took home the championship, Thompson finished second, and Flock only started 4 races for Kiekhaefer but still brought home a 9th place for his season efforts. Flock quit the Kiekhaefer team part way into the season citing an overly oppressive and driven to win Kiekhaefer. Rules and living arrangements were established by Kiekhaefer; Husbands and wives as well as driver and girlfriends were not allowed to share quarters the night before the race. Herb Thomas replaced Flock on the team, but he refused to remain for the whole season as well.

At the time the season occurred, NASCAR was aspiring to become the United States' new dominant race-sanctioning body. This had previously been the a distinction held by the AAA Contest Board. However, the American Automobile Association had ended its involvement in automobile racing in the aftermath of the 1955 Le Mans disaster. Other organizations that were frontrunners angling to become the new dominant U.S. race-sanctioning body were the United States Auto Club and the Sports Car Club of America.

== Races ==
=== Summary table ===
D Dirt oval
P Paved oval
R Road course
T Temporary circuit

No	Date/(race name)	Miles	Track	Track type		Report	Winning driver	Winning team
No	Date/(race name)	Miles	Track	Pavement/shape	Length category (Note: using modern conventions)	Report	Winning driver	Winning team
1	11/13/1955	80	Hickory Speedway (Hickory, NC)	D dirt oval	short track		Tim Flock	Kiekhaefer
2	11/20/1955	101	Charlotte Speedway (Charlotte NC)	D dirt oval	short track		Fonty Flock	Kiekhaefer
3	11/20/1955	200	Willow Springs Raceway (Willow Springs, CA)	R road course	intermediate/standard		Chuck Stevenson	Carl Dane
4	12/11/1955	100	Palm Beach Speedway (West Palm Beach, FL)	P paved oval	short track		Herb Thomas	H. Thomas
5	1/22/1956 (150 Miles at Arizona State Fairgrounds)	150	Arizona State Fairgrounds (Phoenix)	D dirt oval	intermediate		Buck Baker	Kiekhaefer
6	2/26/1956	154	Daytona Beach and Road Course (Daytona Beach)	T paved/dirt temporary oval circuit (Note: while often categorized as a road course, unlike the modern meaning of "road course" this circuit was temporary (using public roads and beach) and an oval)	long/high-speed		Tim Flock	Kiekhaefer
7	3/4/1956	100	Palm Beach Speedway (West Palm Beach, FL)	P paved oval	short track		Billy Myers	Stroppe
8	3/18/1956	53	Wilson Speedway (Wilson, NC)	D dirt oval	short track		Herb Thomas	Yunick
9	3/25/1956	100	Lakewood Speedway (Atlanta, GA)	D dirt oval	intermediate		Buck Baker	Kiekhaefer
10	4/8/1956 (Wilkes County 160)	100	North Wilkesboro Speedway (North Wilkesboro, NC)	D dirt oval	short track	report	Tim Flock	Kiekhaefer
11	4/22/1956	150	Langhorne Speedway (Langhorne, PA)	D dirt oval	short track		Buck Baker	Kiekhaefer
12	4/29/1956 (Richmond 200)	150	Atlantic Rural Fairgrounds (Richmond, VA)	D dirt oval	short track		Buck Baker	Kiekhaefer
13	5/5/1956 (Arclite 100)	100	Columbia Speedway (Cayce, SC)	D dirt oval	short track		Speedy Thompson	Kiekhaefer
14	5/6/1956	100	Harris Speedway (Concord, NC)	D dirt oval	short track		Speedy Thompson	Kiekhaefer
15	5/10/1956	100	Greenville-Pickens Speedway (Easley, SC)	D dirt oval	short track		Buck Baker	Kiekhaefer
16	5/12/1956	80	Hickory Speedway (Hickory, NC)	D dirt oval	short track		Speedy Thompson	Kiekhaefer
17	5/13/1956	90	Orange Speedway (Hillsborough, NC)	D dirt oval	short track		Buck Baker	Kiekhaefer
18	5/20/1956 (Virginia 500)	263	Martinsville Speedway (Ridgeway, VA)	P paved oval	short track	report	Buck Baker	Kiekhaefer
19	5/25/1956	100	Lincoln Speedway (New Oxford, PA)	D dirt oval	short track		Buck Baker	Kiekhaefer
20	5/27/1956	100	Charlotte Speedway (Charlotte NC)	D dirt oval	short track		Speedy Thompson	Kiekhaefer
21	5/27/1956	75	Portland Speedway (Portland, OR)	P paved oval	short track		Herb Thomas	Kiekhaefer
22	5/30/1956	78	Redwood Speedway (CA)	D dirt oval	short track		Herb Thomas	Kiekhaefer
23	5/30/1956	150	Syracuse Mile (Syracuse, NY)	D dirt oval	intermediate		Buck Baker	Kiekhaefer
24	6/3/1956	100	Merced Fairgrounds Speedway (Merced)	D dirt oval	short track		Herb Thomas	Kiekhaefer
25	6/10/1956	251	Memphis-Arkansas Speedway (Lehi, AR)	D dirt oval	intermediate		Ralph Moody	DePaolo
26	6/15/1956	100	Southern States Fairgrounds (Charlotte, NC)	D dirt oval	short track		Speedy Thompson	Kiekhaefer
27	6/22/1956	100	Monroe County Fairgrounds (Rochester, NY)	D dirt oval	short track		Speedy Thompson	Kiekhaefer
28	6/24/1956	100	Portland Speedway (Portland, OR)	P paved oval	short track		John Kieper	J. Kieper
29	7/1/1956	100	Asheville Weaverville Speedway (Weaverville, NC)	D dirt oval	short track		Lee Petty	Petty Enterprises
30	7/4/1956 (Raleigh 250)	250	Raleigh Speedway (Raleigh, NC)	P paved oval	intermediate		Fireball Roberts	DePaolo
31	7/7/1956	100	Peidmont Interstate Fairgrounds (Spartanburg, SC)	D dirt oval	short track		Lee Petty	Petty Enterprises
32	7/8/1956	100	California State Fairgrounds (Sacramento, CA)	D dirt oval	intermediate	report	Lloyd Dane	L. Dane
33	7/21/1956	100	Soldier Field (Chicago, IL)	P paved oval	short track	report	Fireball Roberts	DePaolo
34	7/27/1956	101	Cleveland County Fairgrounds (Shelby, NC)	D dirt oval	short track		Speedy Thompson	Kiekhaefer
35	7/29/1956	100	Montgomery Speedway (Montgomery, AL)	P paved oval	short track		Marvin Panch	Harbison
36	8/3/1956	100	Oklahoma State Fairgrounds (Oklahoma City, OK)	D dirt oval	short track		Jim Paschal	Hayworth
–	8/4/1956	200 (planned)	Tulsa Fairgrounds (Tulsa, OK)	D dirt oval	short track		cancelled mid-race	
37	8/12/1956 (International Stock Car Road Race)	258	Road America (Elkhart Lake, WI)	R road course	long/high-speed	report	Tim Flock	Stroppe
38	8/17/1956	100	Old Bridge Stadium (Old Bridge, NJ)	P paved oval	short track		Ralph Moody	DePaolo
39	8/19/1956	241	Bay Meadows Speedway (San Mateo, CA)	D dirt oval	intermediate		Eddie Pagan	E. Pagan
40	8/22/1956	100	Norfolk Speedway (Norfolk, VA)	D dirt oval	short track		Billy Myers	Stroppe
41	8/23/1956	100	Peidmont Interstate Fairgrounds (Spartanburg, SC)	D dirt oval	short track		Ralph Moody	DePaolo
42	8/25/1956	100	Coastal Speedway (Myrtle Beach, SC)	D dirt oval	short track		Fireball Roberts	DePaolo
43	8/26/1956	123	Portland Speedway (Portland, OR)	P paved oval	short track		Royce Hagerty	Weida
44	9/3/1956 (Southern 500)	501	Darlington Raceway (Darlington, SC)	P paved oval	intermediate	report	Curtis Turner	Schwam
45	9/9/1956	100	Chisholm Speedway (Montgomery, AL)	D dirt oval	short track		Buck Baker	Kiekhaefer
46	9/12/1956	100	Southern States Fairgrounds (Charlotte, NC)	D dirt oval	short track		Ralph Moody	DePaolo
47	9/23/1956	300	Langhorne Speedway (Langhorne, PA)	D dirt oval	short track		Paul Goldsmith	Yunick
48	9/23/1956	125	Portland Speedway (Portland, OR)	P paved oval	short track		Lloyd Dane	L. Dane
49	9/29/1956	100	Columbia Speedway (Cayce, SC)	D dirt oval	short track		Buck Baker	Kiekhaefer
50	9/30/1956	99	Orange Speedway (Hillsborough, NC)	D dirt oval	short track		Fireball Roberts	DePaolo
51	10/7/1956	100	Newport Speedway (Newport, TN)	P paved oval	short track		Fireball Roberts	DePaolo
52	10/14/1956	100	Charlotte Speedway (Charlotte NC)	D dirt oval	short track		Buck Baker	Kiekhaefer
53	10/23/1956	100	Cleveland County Fairgrounds (Shelby, NC)	D dirt oval	short track		Buck Baker	Kiekhaefer
54	10/28/1956	200	Martinsville Speedway (Ridgeway, VA)	P paved oval	short track		Jack Smith	Kiekhaefer
55	11/11/1956 (Buddy Shuman 250)	125	Hickory Speedway (Hickory, NC)	D dirt oval	short track	report	Speedy Thompson	Kiekhaefer
56	11/18/1956 (Old Dominion 400) (Note: race was part of both NASCAR's Grand National Series and Convertible Division seasons)	100	Wilson Speedway (Wilson, NC)	D dirt oval	short track	report	Buck Baker	Kiekhaefer

=== Attendance ===
More than 430,000 spectators attended races.

No	Date/(race name)	Track	Attendance
1	11/13/1955	Hickory Speedway (Hickory, NC)	7,500
2	11/20/1955	Charlotte Speedway (Charlotte NC)	10,500
3	11/20/1955	Willow Springs Raceway (Willow Springs, CA)	17,000
4	12/11/1955	Palm Beach Speedway (West Palm Beach, FL)	4,500
5	1/22/1956	Arizona State Fairgrounds (Phoenix)	
6	2/26/1956	Daytona Beach and Road Course (Daytona Beach)	29,000
7	3/4/1956	Palm Beach Speedway (West Palm Beach, FL)	5,200
8	3/18/1956	Wilson Speedway (Wilson, NC)	5,000
9	3/25/1956	Lakewood Speedway (Atlanta, GA)	17,812
10	4/8/1956 (Wilkes County 160)	North Wilkesboro Speedway (North Wilkesboro, NC)	7,500
11	4/22/1956	Langhorne Speedway (Langhorne, PA)	24,000
12	4/29/1956 (Richmond 200)	Atlantic Rural Fairgrounds (Richmond, VA)	5,000
13	5/5/1956 (Arclite 100)	Columbia Speedway (Cayce, SC)	5,000
14	5/6/1956	Harris Speedway (Concord, NC)	6,000
15	5/10/1956	Greenville-Pickens Speedway (Easley, SC)	5,000
16	5/12/1956	Hickory Speedway (Hickory, NC)	4,500
17	5/13/1956	Orange Speedway (Hillsborough, NC)	7,500
18	5/20/1956 (Virginia 500)	Martinsville Speedway (Ridgeway, VA)	20,000

No	Date/(race name)	Track	Attendance
19	5/25/1956	Lincoln Speedway (New Oxford, PA)	
20	5/27/1956	Charlotte Speedway (Charlotte NC)	3,900
21	5/27/1956	Portland Speedway (Portland, OR)	
22	5/30/1956	Redwood Speedway (CA)	
23	5/30/1956	Syracuse Mile (Syracuse, NY)	6,000
24	6/3/1956	Merced Fairgrounds Speedway (Merced)	
25	6/10/1956	Memphis-Arkansas Speedway (Lehi, AK)	15,000
26	6/15/1956	Southern States Fairgrounds (Charlotte, NC)	7,800
27	6/22/1956	Monroe County Fairgrounds (Rochester, NY)	6,000
28	6/24/1956	Portland Speedway (Portland, OR)	1,800
29	7/1/1956	Asheville Weaverville Speedway (Weaverville, NC)	8,000
30	7/4/1956 (Raleigh 250)	Raleigh Speedway (Raleigh, NC)	13,600
31	7/7/1956	Peidmont Interstate Fairgrounds (Spartanburg, SC)	
32	7/8/1956	California State Fairgrounds (Sacramento, CA)	
33	7/21/1956	Soldier Field (Chicago, IL)	14,402
34	7/27/1956	Cleveland County Fairgrounds (Shelby, NC)	
35	7/29/1956	Montgomery Speedway (Montgomery, AL)	
36	8/3/1956	Oklahoma State Fairgrounds (Oklahoma City, OK)	7,500
–	8/4/1956	Tulsa Fairgrounds (Tulsa, OK)	6,200
37	8/12/1956 (International Stock Car Road Race)	Road America (Elkhart Lake, WI)	10,000
38	8/17/1956	Old Bridge Stadium (Old Bridge, NJ)	

No	Date/(race name)	Track	Attendance
39	8/19/1956	Bay Meadows Speedway (San Mateo, CA)	
40	8/22/1956	Norfolk Speedway (Norfolk, VA)	
41	8/23/1956	Peidmont Interstate Fairgrounds (Spartanburg, SC)	6,000
42	8/25/1956	Coastal Speedway (Myrtle Beach, SC)	
43	8/26/1956	Portland Speedway (Portland, OR)	
44	9/3/1956 (Southern 500)	Darlington Raceway (Darlington, SC)	70,000
45	9/9/1956	Chisholm Speedway (Montgomery, AL)	2,000
46	9/12/1956	Southern States Fairgrounds (Charlotte, NC)	7,300
47	9/23/1956	Langhorne Speedway (Langhorne, PA)	31,000
48	9/23/1956	Portland Speedway (Portland, OR)	
49	9/29/1956	Columbia Speedway (Cayce, SC)	
50	9/30/1956	Orange Speedway (Hillsborough, NC)	7,200
51	10/7/1956	Newport Speedway (Newport, TN)	6,000
52	10/14/1956	Charlotte Speedway (Charlotte NC)	6,800
53	10/23/1956	Cleveland County Fairgrounds (Shelby, NC)	
54	10/28/1956	Martinsville Speedway (Ridgeway, VA)	9,500
55	11/11/1956 (Buddy Shuman 250)	Hickory Speedway (Hickory, NC)	3,500
56	11/18/1956	Wilson Speedway (Wilson, NC)	

=== 1955 ===
==== Race 1: Hickory Speedway (November 13) ====
On November 13, 1955, at the Hickory Speedway, 7,500 people watched as the 1956 NASCAR season got underway, with Tim Flock capturing the win in one of Carl Kiekhaefer's Mercury Outboard motors sponsored Chryslers. (Note: Kiekhaefer Mercury was founded in 1939, and sponsored NASCAR entries as Mercury Outboard motors and Kiekhaefer Outboards. The company is currently known as Mercury Marine) Flock started on the pole and led the first 121 laps of the 200 lap event before spinning in turn three. Lee Petty took the lead and led through lap 138 when Flock caught and passed him; then Flock led from lap 139 to finish. Petty would finish third behind Flock and Curtis Turner, with Dink Widenhouse and Jim Paschal rounding out the top 5. There were 4 cautions on the 0.4 2.5-mile (4.0 km) dirt track, for a total of 23 laps.

Stats
Winning driver:	Tim Flock
Winning team:	Kiekhaefer
Winning car make:	1955 Chrysler
Track description:	0.4-mile (0.64 km) dirt short track oval
Laps:	200
Length:	80 mi (130 km)
Competitors:	31 drivers
Attendance	7,500
Duration:	1:24:16
Avg. speed:	56.962 mph (91.671 km/h)
Pole speed:	68.965 mph (110.988 km/h)
Cautions:	4
Caution laps:	23
Lead changes:	2
Margin-of-victory:	7 seconds

==== Race 2: Charlotte Speedway (November 20) ====
On November 20, Race 2 was held on the 3/4 mile dirt track Charlotte Speedway. Tim Flock's brother Fonty, who also drove for Kiekhaefer, would lead the race from start to finish, narrowly edged out his brother Tim by half a car length. Lee Petty, Joe Weatherly and, Buck Baker would round out the top five. This would be Kiekhaefer's 10th win in 12 races, dating back to the 1955 season.

Races 2 and 3 were held on the same day.

Stats
Winning driver:	Fonty Flock
Winning team:	Kiekhaefer
Winning car make:	1955 Chrysler
Track description:	0.76-mile (1.22 km) dirt short track oval
Laps:	200
Length:	100.5 mi (161.7 km)
Competitors:	27 drivers
Attendance	10,500
Duration:	1:37:32
Avg. speed:	61.825 mph (99.498 km/h)
Pole speed:	70.496 mph (113.452 km/h)
Cautions:	2
Caution laps:	7
Lead changes:	0
Margin-of-victory:	0.5 car-lengths

==== Race 3: Willow Springs Raceway (November 20) ====
Also on November 20, in California at Willow Springs Raceway, NASCAR held a 200-mile road race at Willow Springs Raceway in California. Chuck Stevenson grabbed that win in his 1956 Ford; followed by Marvin Panch and Johnny Mantz as November came to a close.

Stats
Winning driver:	Chuck Stevenson
Winning team:	Dane
Winning car make:	1956 Ford
Track description:	2.5-mile (4.0 km) road course
Laps:	80
Length:	200 mi (320 km)
Competitors:	37 drivers
Attendance	17,000
Duration:	3:00:25
Avg. speed:	66.512 mph (107.041 km/h)
Pole speed:	76.556 mph (123.205 km/h)
Cautions:	0
Caution laps:	0
Lead changes:	7
Margin-of-victory:	500 ft (150 m)

==== Race 4: Palm Beach Speedway (December 11) ====
On December 11, 4,500 spectators watched a race at the Palm Beach Speedway in West Palm Beach, Florida. The race is notable in that the first two drivers across the finish line, Joe Weatherly and Jim Reed, were disqualified due to technical violations. The race was awarded to Herb Thomas. Although Weatherly and Reed finished more than a lap ahead of Thomas NASCAR found that their cars were not strictly stock. Weatherly had a special cam installed, and Reed was found to be using modified valves, and both were stripped of their finishing positions. Thomas won the 200 lap, half mile track, race in an hour and a half. Al Keller finished second, Billy Myers grabbed the third spot with Buck Baker and Lee Petty rounding out the top 5. After the race Big Bill France announced that anyone caught cheating again would not only forfeit their finishing position, but their prize money and all their season points to date as well. This ended the 1955 year for NASCAR racing.

Stats
Winning driver:	Herb Thomas
Winning team:	Herb Thomas
Winning car make:	1956 Chevrolet
Track description:	0.5-mile (0.80 km) paved short track oval
Laps:	200
Length:	100 mi (160 km)
Competitors:	23 drivers
Attendance	4,500
Duration:	1:31:50
Avg. speed:	65.009 mph (104.622 km/h)
Pole speed:	78.912 mph (126.997 km/h)

=== Winter of 1956 ===
==== Race 5: 150 Miles at Arizona State Fairgrounds (January 22) ====
program cover from January 22 race

On January 22, the 150 Miles at Arizona State Fairgrounds was contested as the season's fifth race. It was held at the Arizona State Fairgrounds in Phoenix, Arizona. Buck Baker, in his 55 Chrysler, earned the first win of the new year, and Kiekhaefer drivers Billy Myers and Ralph Moody captured second and third. Baker's victory was his first start for the juggernaut Kiekhaefer team. When Kiekhaefer realized how formidable Baker was on the track he was quoted as saying "There's only one thing to do with a man like that; and that is to hire him." Slowed by 8 cautions, the one mile dirt track hosted the 150 mile race in two and a half hours.

Stats
Winning driver:	Buck Baker
Winning team:	Kiekhaefer
Winning car make:	1955 Chrysler
Track description:	1-mile (1.6 km) dirt oval
Laps:	150
Length:	150 mi (240 km)
Competitors:	30 drivers
Duration:	2:19:44
Avg. speed:	64.408 mph (103.655 km/h)
Pole speed:	71.315 mph (114.770 km/h)
Cautions:	8
Lead changes:	3
Margin-of-victory:	10 car-lengths

==== Race 6: Daytona Beach and Road Course (February 26) ====
Race 6 was held February 25 at Daytona Beach and Road Course Team owner Kiekhaefer fielded 6 of his drivers for the race: Buck Baker, Tim Flock, his brother Fonty Flock, Charlie Scott, Frank Munday and Speedy Thompson. Tim Flock survived the track and 70-plus other drivers (Note: 80 cars were entered, 2 did not start, and 6 more failed to complete a lap. In total, 72 cars completed one lap or more) to win the race, marking his second in a row win at the beach. Charlie Scott, the 19th-place finisher, is noted as one of the first African-American drivers in NASCAR. The race was flagged to a stop 2 laps before the scheduled 160 miles due to a high tide on the beach.

On February 25, the day before the Grand National race, the track had hosted NASCAR's inaugural NASCAR Convertible Division race. Along with drivers, owners, mechanics and, officials, 13,500 spectators gathered at the 4.1 mile road course to watch Curtis Turner in his 56 Ford convertible beat Fireball Roberts and 26 other drivers to the checkered flag through 160 miles of racing.

Stats
Winning driver:	Tim Flock
Winning team:	Kiekhaefer
Winning car make:	1956 Chrysler
Track description:	4.1-mile (6.6 km) semi-paved semi-dirt street oval
Laps:	39 (planned) 37 (raced)
Length:	160 mi (260 km) (planned)
Competitors:	80 drivers (entered)
Attendance:	29,000
Duration:	1:40:24
Avg. speed:	90.657 mph (145.898 km/h)
Pole speed:	135.747 mph (218.464 km/h)
Cautions:	2
Caution laps:	2
Lead changes:	2
Margin-of-victory:	57 seconds

==== Race 7: Palm Beach Speedway (March 4) ====
On March 4, the drivers returned to Palm Beach Speedway for race number 7, a 100-mile event. Once again disqualification would play a part in who was declared the winner. Al Keller beat Billy Myers to the checkered flag. However, after Keller was found to have been racing with modified pistons, Myers was awarded the victory. Buck Baker and Herb Thomas grabbed the second and third spots respectively.

Stats
Winning driver:	Billy Myers
Winning team:	Stroppe
Winning car make:	1956 Mercury
Track description:	0.5-mile (0.80 km) paved short track oval
Laps:	200
Length:	100 mi (160 km)
Competitors:	30 drivers
Attendance	5,200
Duration:	1:26:32
Avg. speed:	68.99 mph (111.03 km/h)
Pole speed:	81.081 mph (130.487 km/h)
Cautions:	1
Caution laps:	3
Lead changes:	2

==== Race 8: Wilson Speedway (March 18) ====
On March 18, 5,000 spectators gathered for Race 8; which was contested on the half mile dirt track of Wilson Speedway. Herb Thomas captured his second win of the season in a Smokey Yunick-prepared Chevy when rain cut the scheduled 200 lap event to 106 laps.

Stats
Winning driver:	Herb Thomas
Winning team:	Yunick
Winning car make:	1956 Chevrolet
Track description:	0.5-mile (0.80 km) dirt short track oval
Laps:	200 (planned) 106 (raced)
Length:	100 mi (160 km) (planned)
Competitors:	33 drivers
Attendance	5,000
Duration:	1:08:42
Avg. speed:	46.287 mph (74.492 km/h)
Pole speed:	57.197 mph (92.050 km/h)

==== Race 9: Lakewood Speedway (March 25) ====
On March 25, the Grand National series raced on the one mile dirt track of Lakewood Speedway in Atlanta, Georgia. The event was darkened by the death of Lou Moore who suffered a intracerebral hemorrhage while at the track, and died in the hospital before the end of the race. Moore was a well known Indianapolis 500 car driver, builder and owner. Buck Baker came away with the Wilson Speedway win, and Speedy Thompson finished second, giving Kiekhaefer another 1-2 finish and bringing the March contests to a close.

Stats
Winning driver:	Buck Baker
Winning team:	Kiekhaefer
Winning car make:	1956 Chrysler
Track description:	1-mile (1.6 km) dirt oval
Laps:	100
Length:	100 miles (160 km)
Competitors:	28 drivers (entered)
Attendance:	17,812
Duration:	1:24:56
Avg. speed:	70.643 mph (113.689 km/h)
Pole speed:	82.154 mph (132.214 km/h)
Lead changes:	1

=== Spring of 1956 ===
==== Race 10: Wilkes County 160 at North Wilkesboro Speedway (April 8) ====
The new month and race 10 would bring one of the 1956 season's biggest turning points as April 8 ushered the NASCAR crew to 0.6 mile North Wilkesboro Speedway in North Wilkesboro, N.C. for the Wilkes County 160. Tim Flock posted his third win of the season, and Billy Myers finished second, as 7,500 spectators looked on. Jim Paschal grabbed the third spot, as Herb Thomas and Ralph Moody rounded out the top 5. The news of the day was when Flock shocked the NASCAR family and abruptly quit the highly successful Kiekhaefer Chrysler team after the race, citing worsening ulcers and Kiekhaefer's attitude as the reasons. Kiekhaefer tried to convince Flock to stay with the team, but Flock was adamant about leaving for a Chevy team.

Flock later recounted,

I couldn't take Kiekhaefer's drill-sergeant attitude anymore. I had to quit to save my own life.

Stats
Winning driver:	Tim Flock
Winning team:	Kiekhaefer
Winning car make:	1956 Chrysler
Track description:	0.625-mile (1.006 km) dirt short track oval
Laps:	160
Length:	100 miles (160 km)
Competitors:	29 drivers
Attendance:	7,500
Duration:	1:24:28
Avg. speed:	71.034 mph (114.318 km/h)
Pole speed:	78.37 mph (126.12 km/h)
Lead changes:	2

==== Race 11: Langhorne Speedway (April 22) ====
On April 22, the season's eleventh was contested on the 1 mile dirt track Langhorne Speedway in Langhorne, Pennsylvania. Tragedy struck once again as young driver John McVitty died of massive internal injuries after being thrown from his car as it rolled the day before the race during qualifying. To fill the empty seat left by Flock's leaving, and now driving a Smokey Yunick prepared ride, Kiekhaefer hired Herb Thomas to join his NASCAR team. Flock moved into the lead on lap 115, but would give way to eventual winner Buck Baker with six laps remaining in the 150 lap event. Thomas finished second and Flock dropped to third by the end of the race.

Stats
Winning driver:	Buck Baker
Winning team:	Kiekhaefer
Winning car make:	1956 Chrysler
Track description:	1-mile (1.6 km) dirt short track oval
Laps:	150
Length:	150 miles (240 km)
Competitors:	41 drivers
Attendance:	24,000
Duration:	1:58:32
Avg. speed:	75.928 mph (122.194 km/h)
Pole speed:	104.59 mph (168.32 km/h)
Lead changes:	2
Margin-of-victory:	1 lap+

==== Race 12: Richmond 200 at Atlantic Rural Fairgrounds (April 29) ====
April 29 brought 5,000 spectators to the Atlantic Rural Fairgrounds for the Richmond 200 event on the half mile dirt track. Buck Baker dominated, leading all but two laps and lapped the entire field including second place Herb Thomas by the time the checkered flag fell. Baker’s win coupled with Flocks last place finish moved Baker into first place in the standings.

Stats
Winning driver:	Buck Baker
Winning team:	Kiekhaefer
Winning car make:	1956 Dodge
Track description:	0.5-mile (0.80 km) dirt short track oval
Laps:	200
Length:	100 miles (160 km)
Competitors:	24 drivers
Attendance:	5,000
Duration:	1:46:42
Avg. speed:	56.232 mph (90.497 km/h)
Pole speed:	67.091 mph (107.972 km/h)
Lead changes:	2
Margin-of-victory:	1 lap+

==== Race 13: Arclite 100 at the Columbia Speedway (May 5) ====
On May 5, the Arclite 100 was held at the Columbia Speedway in Cayce, South Carolina as the thirteenth race of the season. Speedy Thompson won the 100 mile race. This was the fourth consecutive race in which both the winner and runner-up were Kiekhaefer cars. The win at Columbia Speedway was Thompson's fifth career win, and his first of the season. Buck Baker, Joe Weatherly, Tiny Lund, and Bob Flock respectively finished second, third, fourth, and fifth. 5,000 spectators attended the hour and fifty minute race.

Stats
Winning driver:	Speedy Thompson
Winning team:	Kiekhaefer
Winning car make:	1956 Dodge
Track description:	0.5-mile (0.80 km) dirt short track oval
Laps:	200
Length:	100 miles (160 km)
Competitors:	26 drivers
Attendance:	5,000
Duration:	1:50:00
Avg. speed:	54.545 mph (87.782 km/h)
Pole speed:	63.274 mph (101.830 km/h)
Cautions	2
Lead changes:	3
Margin-of-victory:	2 laps + 25 seconds

==== Race 14: Harris Speedway (May 6) ====
On May 6, the second day of the double-duty weekend had the NASCAR race at Harris Speedway in Concord, North Carolina for a 100-mile event on their half-mile dirt track. Speedy Thompson grabbed his second checkered flag in a row, besting Buck Baker and Herb Thomas who finished second and third respectively. It was another 1-2-3 victory for the powerful Kiekhaefer team. Thompson led all but one lap in the one hour and 37 minute event.

Stats
Winning driver:	Speedy Thompson
Winning team:	Kiekhaefer
Winning car make:	1956 Chrysler
Track description:	0.5-mile (0.80 km) dirt short track oval
Laps:	200
Length:	100 miles (160 km)
Competitors:	30 drivers
Attendance:	6,000
Duration:	1:37:21
Avg. speed:	61.633 mph (99.189 km/h)
Pole speed:	65.241 mph (104.995 km/h)
Cautions	1
Caution laps	3
Lead changes:	2
Margin-of-victory:	18 seconds

==== Race 15: Greenville-Pickens Speedway (May 10) ====
On May 10, race fifteen was held at the Greenville-Pickens Speedway in South Carolina. Buck Baker gave Kiekhaefer his 7th victory in a row. The race result would be unsuccessfully challenged. After Baker managed to run the full 200 laps on the half-mile dirt track without a single pit stop, Schwam Motor Co., who fielded Fords for Joe Weatherly and Curtis Turner, went to NASCAR officials and filed a protest against the Kiekhaefer team. An enraged Kiekhaefer filed a counter protest against the Schwam Fords, claiming they ran with illegal motors and rear-ends. Technical inspector Jim Ross reviewed both claims, and held that both cars were legal, giving Baker a 100-point lead in the standings. The final results for the race were that the 500B Chrysler of Baker's was the winner, Curtis Turner in his number 99 second, and Joe Eubanks third. Gwyn Staley and Joe Weatherly rounded out the top five.

Stats
Winning driver:	Buck Baker
Winning team:	Kiekhaefer
Winning car make:	1956 Dodge
Track description:	0.5-mile (0.80 km) dirt short track oval
Laps:	200
Length:	100 miles (160 km)
Competitors:	23 drivers
Attendance:	5,000
Duration:	1:39:24
Avg. speed:	60.362 mph (97.143 km/h)
Pole speed:	61.1 mph (98.3 km/h)
Margin-of-victory:	1 lap +

==== Race 16: Hickory Speedway (May 12) ====
On May 12, the Grand National series returned to the Hickory Speedway. 4,500 spectators attended the race, which Speedy Thompson led from start to finish. The race was filled with cautions, 6 in total throughout the 200 lap event. There were no driver injuries, and Billy Myers finished second with Buck Baker, Herb Thomas, and Gwyn Stanley filling out the top five spots. Thompson's win gave Kiekhaefer his eighth straight win.

Stats
Winning driver:	Speedy Thompson
Winning team:	Kiekhaefer
Winning car make:	1956 Chrysler
Track description:	0.4-mile (0.64 km) dirt short track oval
Laps:	200
Length:	80 miles (130 km)
Competitors:	24 drivers
Attendance:	4,500
Duration:	1:20:45
Avg. speed:	59.442 mph (95.663 km/h)
Pole speed:	67.447 mph (108.545 km/h)
Cautions	6
Lead changes:	0
Margin-of-victory:	Under caution

==== Race 17: Orange Speedway (May 13) ====
On May 13, the season's seventeenth race was contested on the 0.9-mile Orange Speedway dirt track in Hillsborough, North Carolina. In a near photo finish Buck Baker barely squeaked past Speedy Thompson at the end of the 90 mile event. This was the ninth win of the for Kiekhaefer. The roughly one-hour race was attended by 7,500 spectators.

Stats
Winning driver:	Buck Baker
Winning team:	Kiekhaefer
Winning car make:	1956 Chrysler
Track description:	0.9-mile (1.4 km) dirt short track oval
Laps:	100
Length:	90 miles (140 km)
Competitors:	31 drivers
Attendance:	7,500
Duration:	1:04:30
Avg. speed:	83.72 mph (134.73 km/h)
Pole speed:	89.305 mph (143.722 km/h)
Lead changes:	2
Margin-of-victory:	1 half-lap

==== Race 18: "Virginia 500" at Martinsville Speedway (May 20) ====
On May 20, racing was held at the picturesque half-mile paved track of the Martinsville Speedway in the newly named Virginia 500 race. 20,000 spectators watched the 4 hour, 500 lap race, which saw seven caution flags. The race saw Speedy Thompson leading a race high 259 laps, only to fall to Buck Baker on lap 382. Baker maintained his lead after passing Thompson, delivering the Kiekhaefer team its tenth victory of the season. Lee Petty, Paul Goldsmith and Gwyn Stanley finished third through fifth respectively.

Stats
Winning driver:	Buck Baker
Winning team:	Kiekhaefer
Winning car make:	1956 Dodge
Track description:	0.5-mile (0.80 km) paved short track oval
Laps:	500
Length:	250 miles (400 km)
Competitors:	35 drivers
Attendance:	20,000
Duration:	4:06:07
Avg. speed:	60.824 mph (97.887 km/h)
Pole speed:	66.103 mph (106.382 km/h)
Cations:	7
Caution laps:	20
Lead changes:	5
Margin-of-victory:	1 half-lap

==== Race 19: Lincoln Speedway (May 25) ====
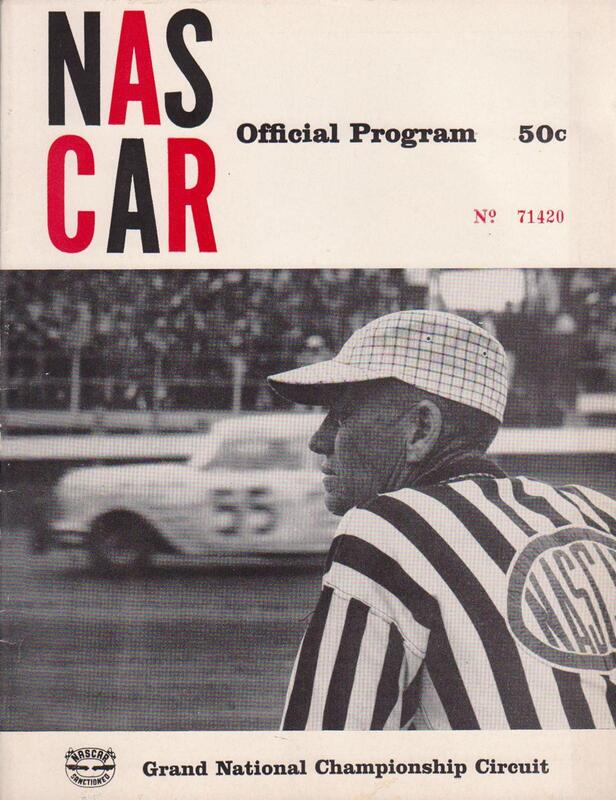
Program from the May 15 race at Lincoln Speedway

On May 25, seventeen drivers competed on the half-mile dirt track of Lincoln Speedway in New Oxford, Pennsylvania for 200 laps. In another close finish, Buck Baker secured his third win in a row. Billy Myers had led the first 43 laps until his fuel pump failed, and pole sitter Speedy Thompson retired on lap 97 with a hole in his radiator. Lee Petty put on a show for the fans when he lost a lap after spinning in lap 21. Petty then drove back into the lead lap, and into contention with some yellow flag help. Only eight of the seventeen competing racers completed the race. Baker, Jim Paschal, Petty, Herb Thomas, and Nace Mattingly all finished in the top five.

Stats
Winning driver:	Buck Baker
Winning team:	Kiekhaefer
Winning car make:	1956 Dodge
Track description:	0.5-mile (0.80 km) dirt short track oval
Laps:	200
Length:	100 miles (160 km)
Competitors:	17 drivers
Duration:	1:26:11
Avg. speed:	69.619 mph (112.041 km/h)
Lead changes:	3
Margin-of-victory:	1 car-length

==== Race 20: Charlotte Speedway (May 27) ====
On May 27, NASCAR held two races. The first of these was on the Charlotte Speedway, a 3/4 mile track. The Kiekhaefer saw its drivers once again win all three podium spots, as Speedy Thompson, the newly acquired Junior Johnson, and points-leader Buck Baker all finished in the top-three spots. Thompson's win was the twelfth victory for the Kiekhaefer team.

Stats
Winning driver:	Speedy Thompson
Winning team:	Kiekhaefer
Winning car make:	1956 Chrysler
Track description:	0.75-mile (1.21 km) dirt short track oval
Laps:	133
Length:	99.750 miles (160.532 km)
Competitors:	25 drivers
Attendance:	3,900
Duration:	1:32:16
Avg. speed:	64.866 mph (104.392 km/h)
Pole speed:	76.966 mph (123.865 km/h)
Cautions:	3
Caution laps:	9
Lead changes:	6

==== Race 21: Portland Speedway (May 27) ====
The second race held on May 27 was across the country from the first at the Portland Speedway in Portland, Oregon. Herb Thomas gave the Kiekhaefer team another win. John Kieper finished second and Clyde Palmer finished third.

This was the first NASCAR Grand National Series race held at the track. The series would race three more times in its 1956 season. The following season featured three more races at the track, after which NASCAR's premier division did not return to the track.

The race was a combined race that also counted as part of the 1956 NASCAR Pacific Coast Late Model Division season.

Stats
Winning driver:	Herb Thomas
Winning team:	Kiekhaefer
Winning car make:	1956 Chrysler
Track description:	0.5-mile (0.80 km) paved short track oval
Laps:	150
Length:	75 miles (121 km)
Competitors:	21 drivers
Duration:	1:10:31
Avg. speed:	63.815 mph (102.700 km/h)
Pole speed:	67.239 mph (108.211 km/h)

==== Race 22: Redwood Speedway (May 30) ====
Two races were held on May 30, the first being at Redwood Speedway in California. Due to poor track and weather conditions, the race was halted early after only 78 miles of the scheduled 100 miles had been completed. Ruts and holes in the 0.624 dirt track and swirling dust storms made the track unsafe to race on. Herb Thomas won the shortened race.

Stats
Winning driver:	Herb Thomas
Winning team:	Kiekhaefer
Winning car make:	1956 Chrysler
Track description:	0.625-mile (1.006 km) dirt short track oval
Laps:	160 (planned)
Length:	100 miles (160 km) (planned)
Competitors:	25 drivers
Duration:	2:00:46
Avg. speed:	38.814 mph (62.465 km/h)
Pole speed:	34.07 mph (54.83 km/h)
Lead changes:	1
Margin-of-victory:	1 lap +

==== Race 23: Syracuse Mile (May 30) ====
The second race of the day on May 30 was held across the country from the first, being held on the Syracuse Mile, a 1-mile dirt oval at the New York State Fairgrounds in Syracuse, New York. The race was 150 miles in length. Buck Baker delivered the Kiekhaefer team its the second win of the day, defeating Jim Paschal in his Mercedes by 3 laps.

Stats
Winning driver:	Buck Baker
Winning team:	Kiekhaefer
Winning car make:	1956 Chrysler
Track description:	1-mile (1.6 km) dirt oval
Laps:	150
Length:	150 miles (240 km)
Competitors:	24 drivers
Attendance:	6,000
Duration:	1:44:26
Avg. speed:	86.179 mph (138.692 km/h)
Pole speed:	83.975 mph (135.145 km/h)
Cautions:	1
Caution laps:	3
Lead changes:	2
Margin-of-victory:	1 lap +

=== Summer of 1956 ===
==== Race 24: Merced Fairgrounds (June 3) ====
On June 3, Herb Thomas easily won the 24th race. The race was a 100-mile event held at the Merced Fairgrounds in Merced, California. Thomas' win was the sixteenth consecutive win for the Carl Kiekhaefer team, a record that still stands as of 2019, and is unlikely to be broken in the modern era. The win streak would be broken in the following race.

This was the first and only time the series raced at this track. The same day, a NASCAR K&N Pro Series West race was also contested at the track. That race was also won by Herb Thomas. These were the first two of only three NASCAR races at the track, as a K&N Pro Series West race the following year marked NASCAR's final race at the track.

Stats
Winning driver:	Herb Thomas
Winning team:	Kiekhaefer
Winning car make:	1956 Chrysler
Track description:	0.5-mile (0.80 km) dirt short track oval
Laps:	200
Length:	100 miles (160 km)
Competitors:	28 drivers
Duration:	2:06:47
Avg. speed:	47.325 mph (76.162 km/h)
Pole speed:	58.234 mph (93.719 km/h)

==== Race 25: Memphis-Arkansas Speedway (June 10) ====
On June 10, Ralph Moody won the season's 25th race at Memphis-Arkansas Speedway in Lehi, Arkansas in a DePaolo Engineering Ford. This broke the sixteen-race winning streak of the Kiekhaefer team.

Stats
Winning driver:	Ralph Moody
Winning team:	DePaolo
Winning car make:	1956 Ford
Track description:	1.5-mile (2.4 km) dirt oval
Laps:	167
Length:	250 miles (400 km)
Competitors:	29 drivers
Attendance:	15,000
Duration:	3:22:15
Avg. speed:	74.313 mph (119.595 km/h)
Pole speed:	98.504 mph (158.527 km/h)
Cautions:	5
Lead changes:	5
Margin-of-victory:	4 seconds

==== Race 26: Southern States Fairgrounds (June 15) ====
On June 15, the 26th race of the season was held at the Southern States Fairgrounds in Charlotte, North Carolina, a half mile dirt track. The 200 lap event saw Speedy Thompson win in his Chrysler by five laps over second-place finisher Curtis Turner. Lee Petty finished third, with Fireball Roberts and Buck Baker respectively placing 4th and 5th.

Stats
Winning driver:	Speedy Thompson
Winning team:	Kiekhaefer
Winning car make:	1956 Chrysler
Track description:	0.5-mile (0.80 km) dirt short track oval
Laps:	200
Length:	100 miles (160 km)
Competitors:	19 drivers
Attendance:	7,800
Duration:	1:47:06
Avg. speed:	56.022 mph (90.159 km/h)
Pole speed:	59.661 mph (96.015 km/h)
Cautions:	2
Caution laps:	6
Lead changes:	3
Margin-of-victory:	5 laps +

==== Race 27: Monroe County Fairgrounds (June 22) ====
On June 22, NASCAR raced on the half-mile dirt track at the Monroe County Fairgrounds in Rochester, New York. In the 200 lap event, Speedy Thompson won a second-consecutive victory, winning by a full lap over Jim Paschal and Herb Thomas. Buck Baker finished fourth, giving the Kiekhaefer team three of the top four finishing spots. 6,000 spectators attended the race, which feature 21 drivers.

Stats
Winning driver:	Speedy Thompson
Winning team:	Kiekhaefer
Winning car make:	1956 Chrysler
Track description:	0.5-mile (0.80 km) dirt short track oval
Laps:	200
Length:	100 miles (160 km)
Competitors:	21 drivers
Attendance:	6,000
Duration:	1:44:44
Avg. speed:	57.288 mph (92.196 km/h)
Pole speed:	57.434 mph (92.431 km/h)
Cautions:	1
Caution laps:	7
Lead changes:	3
Margin-of-victory:	1 lap +

==== Race 28: Portland Speedway (June 24) ====
On June 24, at the Portland Speedway in Portland, Oregon, John Kieper grabbed a win in his own 1956 Oldsmobile in an hour and a half race on the paved half mile track.

The race was a combined race that was also counted as part of the 1956 NASCAR Pacific Coast Late Model Division season.

Stats
Winning driver:	Johnny Kieper
Winning team:	Johnny Kieper
Winning car make:	1956 Oldsmobile
Track description:	0.5-mile (0.80 km) pave short track oval
Laps:	200
Length:	100 miles (160 km)
Competitors:	20 drivers
Attendance:	1,800
Duration:	1:35:52
Avg. speed:	62.586 mph (100.722 km/h)
Pole speed:	69.934 mph (112.548 km/h)
Pole winner:	Herb Thomas
Cautions:	3
Lead changes:	3
Margin-of-victory:	One half-lap

==== Race 29: Asheville-Weaverville Speedway (July 1) ====
The 29th race was held at the Asheville–Weaverville Speedway in Weaverville, North Carolina and was won by Lee Petty.

Stats
Winning driver:	Lee Petty
Winning team:	Petty Enterprises
Winning car make:	1956 Dodge
Track description:	0.5-mile (0.80 km) dirt short track oval
Laps:	200
Length:	100 miles (160 km)
Competitors:	29 drivers
Attendance:	8,000
Duration:	1:46:29
Avg. speed:	56.435 mph (90.823 km/h)
Pole speed:	72.26 mph (116.29 km/h)
Margin-of-victory:	1 car-length

==== Race 30: Raleigh 250 (July 4) ====
On July 4, Fireball Roberts won the Raleigh 250, a 250-mile race at the Raleigh Speedway in Raleigh, North Carolina. The Raleigh Speedway was a 1-mile oval. This was Roberts' first win on a superspeedway. Kiekhaefer filed a protest with NASCAR officials claiming that Robert's flywheel weight was illegal. At that time NASCAR did not have scales at the track, so they took the flywheel to a fish market to weigh it, and Roberts's victory stood, being upheld by NASCAR.

Stats
Winning driver:	Fireball Roberts
Winning team:	DePaolo
Winning car make:	1956 Ford
Track description:	1-mile (1.6 km) paved oval
Laps:	250
Length:	250 miles (400 km)
Competitors:	36 drivers
Attendance:	13,600
Duration:	3:07:55
Avg. speed:	73.691 mph (118.594 km/h)
Pole speed:	82.587 mph (132.911 km/h)
Cautions:	1
Lead changes:	6
Margin of victory:	2 laps + 10 seconds

==== Race 31: Peidmont Interstate Fairgrounds (July 7) ====
On July 7, the 31st race was contested at Piedmont Interstate Fairgrounds in Spartanburg, South Carolina. It was won by Lee Petty.

Stats
Winning driver:	Lee Petty
Winning team:	Petty Enterprises
Winning car make:	1956 Dodge
Track description:	0.5-mile (0.80 km) dirt short track oval
Laps:	200
Length:	100 miles (160 km)
Competitors:	18 drivers
Duration:	1:58:51
Avg. speed:	50.483 mph (81.245 km/h)
Pole speed:	58.9 mph (94.8 km/h)

==== Race 32: California State Fairgrounds (July 8) ====
On July 8, the 32nd race was contested at California State Fairgrounds in Sacramento, California. It was won by Loyd Dane.

This was the first NASCAR Grand National Series race at the track. NASCAR's top division would race there annually through its 1961 season.

On the same day as the Grand National Series race, a NASCAR Pacific Coast Late Model Division race was also held at the track, which was also won by Dane.

Stats
Winning driver:	Lloyd Dane
Winning team:	Lloyd Dane
Winning car make:	1956 Mercury
Track description:	1-mile (1.6 km) dirt oval
Laps:	100
Length:	100 miles (160 km)
Competitors:	21 drivers
Duration:	1:21:00
Avg. speed:	74.074 mph (119.211 km/h)
Pole speed:	76.612 mph (123.295 km/h)
Margin-of-victory:	2 car-lengths

==== Race 33: Soldier Field (July 21) ====
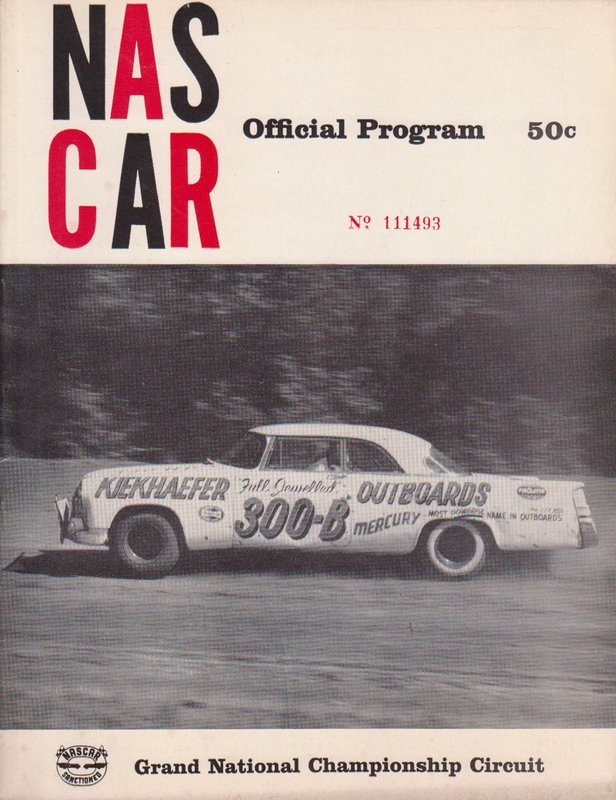
Cover of the program for the Soldier Field race

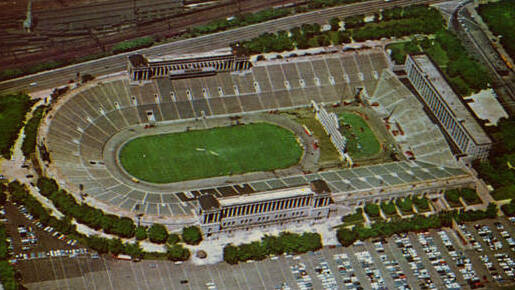
Photograph of Soldier Field circa 1961

On July 21, 1956, Fireball Roberts won a race on the short track at Soldier Field stadium in Chicago, Illinois. This was the first NASCAR Cup race to be held in Chicago. It is today regarded to have been the only NASCAR Cup Series race held at the Soldier Field. Roberts beat Jim Paschal by one car-length. Paschal had been the lap leader until the 194th of 200 laps, when Roberts surpassed him.

The race used the stadium's half-mile short track configuration. At 200 laps, the race's length was 100 miles. Attendance at the race was 14,402.

The race was contested by twenty-five drivers. While not an extraordinarily large number of drivers, some of the season's largest stars were among the competitors. Ten cars failed to finish, with many of these being sidelined due to brake issues.

Stats
Winning driver:	Fireball Roberts
Winning team:	DePaolo
Winning car make:	1956 Ford
Track description:	0.5-mile (0.80 km) paved short track oval
Laps:	200
Length:	100 miles (160 km)
Competitors:	25 drivers
Attendance:	14,402
Duration:	1:38:18
Avg. speed:	61.037 mph (98.230 km/h)
Margin-of-victory:	1 car-length

==== Race 34: Cleveland County Fairgrounds (July 27) ====
On July 27, the 34th race of the season was contested at Cleveland County Fairgrounds in Shelby, North Carolina. It was won by Speedy Thompson of the Kiekhaefer team.

Stats
Winning driver:	Speedy Thompson
Winning team:	Kiekhaefer
Winning car make:	1956 Dodge
Track description:	0.5-mile (0.80 km) dirt short track oval
Laps:	201
Length:	100.5 miles (161.7 km)
Competitors:	17 drivers
Duration:	1:51:44
Avg. speed:	53.699 mph (86.420 km/h)
Pole speed:	55.658 mph (89.573 km/h)

==== Race 35: Montgomery Motor Speedway (July 29) ====
On July 29, the 35th race of the season was contested at Montgomery Speedway in Montgomery, Alabama. It was won by Marvin Panch.

Stats
Winning driver:	Marvin Panch
Winning team:	Harbison
Winning car make:	1956 Ford
Track description:	0.5-mile (0.80 km) paved short track oval
Laps:	200
Length:	100 miles (160 km)
Competitors:	14 drivers
Duration:	1:29:13
Avg. speed:	67.252 mph (108.232 km/h)
Pole speed:	69.444 mph (111.759 km/h)
Lead changes:	3
Margin-of-victory:	1 lap +

==== Race 36: Oklahoma State Fairgrounds (August 3) ====
On August 3, the 36th race of the season was contested at Oklahoma State Fairgrounds in Oklahoma City, Oklahoma. It was won by Jim Paschal, who was racing for Frank Hayworth.

This was the only NASCAR race to be contested on this track.

Stats
Winning driver:	Jim Paschal
Winning team:	Hayworth
Winning car make:	1956 Mercury
Track description:	0.5-mile (0.80 km) dirt short track oval
Laps:	200
Length:	100 miles (160 km)
Competitors:	12 drivers
Attendance:	7,500
Duration:	1:39:50
Avg. speed:	60.1 mph (96.7 km/h)
Pole speed:	64.655 mph (104.052 km/h)
Cautions:	0
Lead changes:	2
Margin-of-victory:	0.25 lap

==== Cancelled race at Tulsa Fairgrounds (August 4) ====
On August 4, 1956, thirteen drivers met for a scheduled 200 lap race on the 0.5 mile dirt oval short track at the Tulsa Fairgrounds. 6,200 spectators gathered in attendance for the race, which was promoted by Jack Zink. However, after 34 laps, Lee Petty (a competing driver) took the initiative to red-flag the race due to conditions of excessive dust combined with poor track lighting. Petty did so by quitting the race by stopping his car near the finish line, and grabbing a flag to wave other drivers to stop racing. The race was cancelled. In NASCAR records, the cancelled race is not considered official, and awarded no points, money, or championship points. The race is believed to have been the only race in NASCAR Cup Series history to have started but failed to become official.

==== Race 37: "International Stock Car Road Race" at Road America (August 12) ====
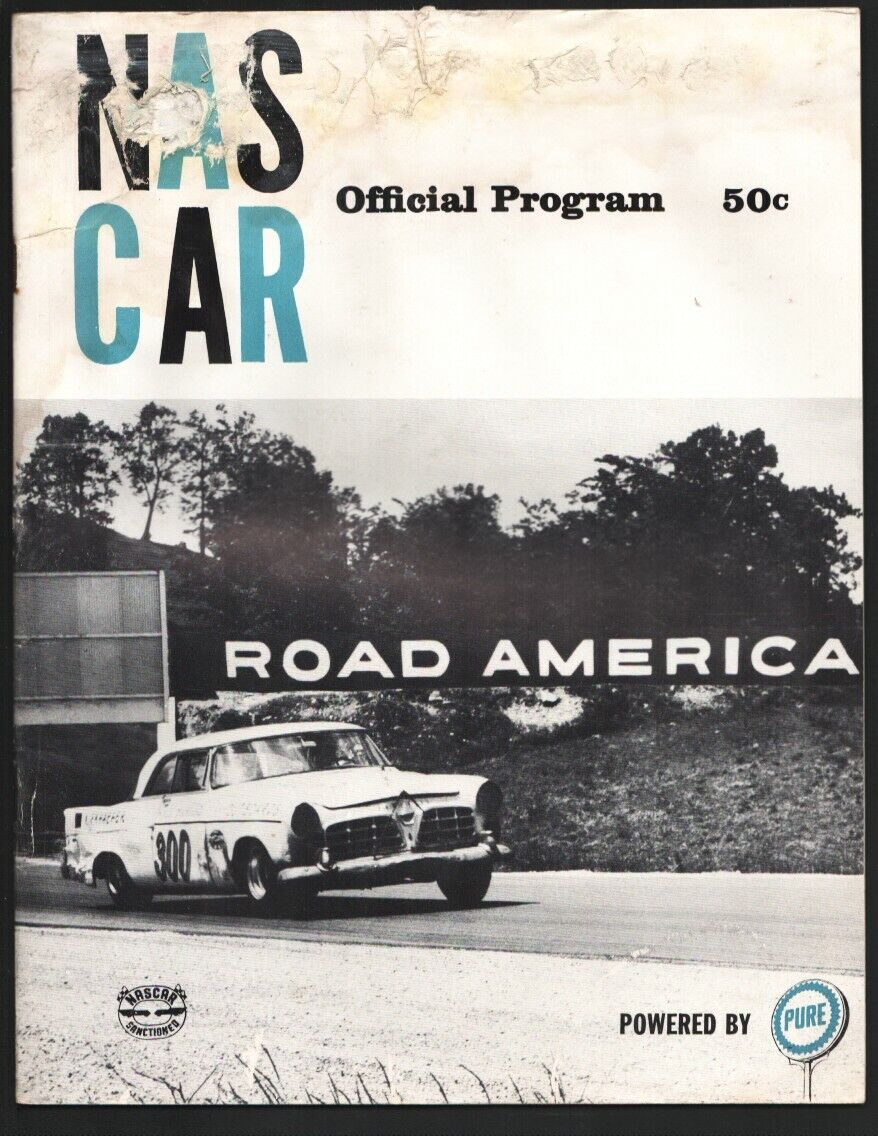
Program from the International Stock Car Road Race

On August 12, 1956, the 37th race of the season was the International Stock Car Road Race at the Road America road course near Elkhart Lake, Wisconsin.

The race took place in rainy weather, and is considered to be the first occasion in which NASCAR ran a race in the rain. After three lead changes, Speedy Thompson led the race between laps 36 and 53, but suffered engine failure in the 53rd lap and retired from the race. Flock led the race thereafter and won. Flock was racing for Bill Stroppe in a 1956 Mercury. This would be the last of Flock's 39 career wins in the premier division of NASCAR (Grand National Series/NASCAR Cup Series). Flock's victory was a 17-second photo finish over fellow Stroppe racer Billy Myers. Fireball Roberts (racing for Pete DePaolo), Paul Goldsmith (racing for Smokey Yunick), and Joe Eubanks (racing for James Satcher) respectively placed third, fourth, and fifth.

While the race was officially sanctioned by NASCAR, the Fédération Internationale de l'Automobile (FIA) provided support for the event and foreign cars were allowed entry. Ultimately, the race featured 25 American vehicles as well as a Jaguar Mark VII. Hubert Schroeder, secretary of the FIG's sporting arm, served as overseer of the race. The prospect of a NASCAR road race on the challenging new road course attracted particular interest, and due to this, it was attended by several racing executives: NASCAR's Bill France Sr., the United States Auto Club's Duane Carter, and the Sports Car Club of America's Jim Kimberly. At the time, all three organizations were aspiring to succeed the AAA Contest Board as the new main United States race-sanctioning body, as the American Auto Association had withdrawn from involvement in automobile racing the previous year.

Road America had opened the previous year. This was the first premier series race on the course. Road America was considered the nation's finest road course at the time, and was regarded as a challenging course, with tight corners and challenging grade changes. Road course racing was uncommon at the time in American stock car racing. The event was promoted as being "America's First International Stock Car Road Race". There was much advanced interest and speculation among how American cars would perform in maneuvering the challenging course. Those seeking to prognosticate how the race would go on challenged by lack of recent precedent of similar races in the United States, with Time magazine writing, "

[The race] was extraordinary because it was held on a road course, a thing so rare in recent American stock car racing that some oldtimers were casting back to the Elgin, Ill. races of more than two decades ago for a suitable precedent.

While the race was considered a success, NASCAR's premier division did not return to Road America until the 2021 season.

The season-dominant Kiekhaefer team did not see much success in the race. While Kiekhaefer racer Buck Baker led the first five laps, he ultimately placed eighth, and his car suffered engine problems by the end of the race. Frank Mundy also raced for Kiekhaefer, placing fourteenth. Speedy Thompson rounded out Kiekhaefer's roster of racers at Road America, finishing eighteenth and suffering engine problems by the end of the race.

Stats
Winning driver:	Tim Flock
Winning team:	Stroppe
Winning car make:	1956 Mercury
Track description:	4.1-mile (6.6 km) road course
Laps:	63
Length:	258.3 miles (415.7 km)
Competitors:	26 drivers
Attendance:	10,000
Duration:	3:29:50
Avg. speed:	73.858 mph (118.863 km/h)
Cautions:	0
Lead changes:	4
Margin-of-victory:	17 seconds

==== Race 38: Old Bridge Stadium (August 17) ====
On August 17, the 38th race of the season was won by Ralph Moody at Old Bridge Stadium in Old Bridge, New Jersey. Jim Reed had led the first 176 laps, but Moody led the final four, securing victory.

While a NASCAR Convertible Series race had previously been held at the course in May, this was the first Grand National Series race held at the track. The Grand National Series would visit the track five more times in subsequent seasons (in 1957, 1958, 1963, 1964, and 1965).

Stats
Winning driver:	Ralph Moody
Winning team:	DePaolo
Winning car make:	1956 Ford
Track description:	0.5-mile (0.80 km) paved short track oval
Laps:	200
Length:	100 miles (160 km)
Competitors:	25 drivers
Duration:	1:32:04
Avg. speed:	65.17 mph (104.88 km/h)
Pole speed:	72.028 mph (115.918 km/h)
Lead changes:	1

==== Race 39: Bay Meadows Speedway (August 19) ====
On August 19, 1956, Eddie Pagan won the season's 39th race, held at the Bay Meadows Speedway in San Mateo, California. Due to a crash, the race, planned to be 250 laps, was shortened to 241 laps.

As with the two races that had been held at the track in the two preceding Grand National Series seasons, the same day as this race the track also hosted a NASCAR K&N Pro Series West race. Pagan won this race as well, similar two the previous two seasons in which the winners of the Grand National Series and K&N Pro Series West races were the same driver. The 1956 races were the final two NASCAR races at the track.

Stats
Winning driver:	Eddie Pagan
Winning team:	Eddie Pagan
Winning car make:	1956 Ford
Track description:	1-mile (1.6 km) dirt oval
Laps:	250 (planned); 241 (raced)
Length:	250 miles (400 km) (planned); 241 miles (388 km) (raced)
Competitors:	37 drivers
Duration:	3:31:00
Avg. speed:	67.161 mph (108.085 km/h)
Pole speed:	81.614 mph (131.345 km/h)
Lead changes:	0

==== Race 40: Norfolk Speedway (August 22) ====
On August 22, Billy Myers won the season's 40th race, which was held at the Norfolk Speedway in Norfolk, Virginia.

While the NASCAR Convertible Series had previously raced at the track on June 22, this was the first Grand National Series race to be held at the track. NASCAR only raced at the track in the 1956 and 1957 seasons, with a single further Grand National Series race and three further Convertible Series races being held in 1957 before NASCAR left the track.

Stats
Winning driver:	Billy Myers
Winning team:	Stroppe
Winning car make:	1956 Mercury
Track description:	0.4-mile (0.64 km) dirt short track oval
Laps:	250
Length:	100 miles (160 km)
Competitors:	14 drivers
Duration:	1:46:22
Avg. speed:	56.408 mph (90.780 km/h)
Pole speed:	58.631 mph (94.357 km/h)
Lead changes:	1
Margin-of-victory:	1 lap +

==== Race 41: Piedmont Interstate Fairgrounds (August 23) ====
On August 23, Ralph Moody won the season's 41s race, which was held at Piedmont Interstate Fairgrounds in Spartanburg, South Carolina.

Stats
Winning driver:	Ralph Moody
Winning team:	DePaolo
Winning car make:	1956 Ford
Track description:	0.5-mile (0.80 km) dirt short track oval
Laps:	200
Length:	100 miles (160 km)
Competitors:	18 drivers
Attendance:	6,000
Duration:	1:50:21
Avg. speed:	54.372 mph (87.503 km/h)
Pole speed:	61.433 mph (98.867 km/h)
Lead changes:	2
Margin-of-victory	2 laps +

==== Race 42: Coastal Speedway (August 25) ====
On August 25, Fireball Roberts won the season's 42nd race, which was held at Costal Speedway in Myrtle Beach, South Carolina.

This was the first NASCAR race at this track. NASCAR would only return one more time, with a Grand National Series race being contested there in 1957.

Stats
Winning driver:	Fireball Roberts
Winning team:	DePaolo
Winning car make:	1956 Ford
Track description:	0.5-mile (0.80 km) dirt short track oval
Laps:	200
Length:	100 miles (160 km)
Competitors:	20 drivers
Duration:	1:58:38
Avg. speed:	50.76 mph (81.69 km/h)
Pole speed:	58.346 mph (93.899 km/h)
Margin-of-victory:	18 seconds

==== Race 43: Portland Speedway (August 26) ====
On August 26, Royce Haggerty won the season's 43rd race, which was held at Portland Speedway in Portland, Oregon. Due to a scoring error, the planned 250 laps were reduced to 246 laps.

The race was a combined race that was also counted as part of the 1956 NASCAR Pacific Coast Late Model Division season.

Stats
Winning driver:	Royce Haggerty
Winning team:	Weida
Winning car make:	1956 Dodge
Track description:	0.5-mile (0.80 km) paved short track oval
Laps:	250 (planned); 246 (raced)
Length:	150 miles (240 km) (planned); 123 miles (198 km)
Competitors:	19 drivers
Pole speed:	65.861 mph (105.993 km/h)

==== Race 44: "Southern 500" at Darlington Raceway (September 3) ====
70,000 attended the 1956 Southern 500 at Darlington Raceway in Darlington, South Carolina, the 44th race of the season. It was won by Curtis Turner.

Stats
Winning driver:	Curtis Turner
Winning team:	Schwam
Winning car make:	1956 Ford
Track description:	1.385-mile (2.229 km) paved oval
Laps:	364
Length:	500.5 miles (805.5 km)
Competitors:	70 drivers
Attendance:	70,000
Duration:	5:15:33
Avg. speed:	95.167 mph (153.156 km/h)
Pole speed:	119.659 mph (192.572 km/h)
Lead changes:	13
Cautions:	7
Caution laps:	68
Margin-of-victory:	2 laps +

==== Race 45: Chisholm Speedway (September 9) ====
On September 9, Buck Baker won the season's 45th race, which was held at Chisholm Speedway in Montgomery, Alabama. This was the only NASCAR race ever contested on this track.

Stats
Winning driver:	Buck Baker
Winning team:	Keikhaefer
Winning car make:	1956 Chrysler
Track description:	0.5-mile (0.80 km) dirt short track oval
Laps:	200
Length:	100 miles (160 km)
Competitors:	22 drivers
Attendance:	2,000
Duration:	1:38:32
Avg. speed:	60.893 mph (97.998 km/h)
Pole speed:	64.864 mph (104.388 km/h)
Lead changes:	3

==== Race 46: Southern States Fairgrounds (September 12) ====
On September 12, Ralph Moody won the season's 46th race, which was held at Southern States Fairgrounds in Charlotte, North Carolina.

Stats
Winning driver:	Ralph Moody
Winning team:	DePaolo
Winning car make:	1956 Ford
Track description:	0.5-mile (0.80 km) dirt short track oval
Laps:	200
Length:	100 miles (160 km)
Competitors:	26 drivers
Attendance:	7,300
Duration:	1:53:32
Avg. speed:	52.847 mph (85.049 km/h)
Pole speed:	59.464 mph (95.698 km/h)
Lead changes:	2
Margin-of-victory	10 seconds

=== Fall of 1956 ===
==== Race 47: Langhorne Speedway (September 23) ====
On September 23, NASCAR held two races. The first of the races, which was held at Langhorne Speedway in Langhorne, Pennsylvania, saw Paul Goldsmith win before a crowd of 31,000 spectators.

Stats
Winning driver:	Paul Goldsmith
Winning team:	Yunick
Winning car make:	1956 Chevrolet
Track description:	1-mile (1.6 km) dirt oval
Laps:	300
Length:	300 miles (480 km)
Competitors:	44 drivers
Attendance:	31,000
Duration:	4:06:34
Avg. speed:	70.615 mph (113.644 km/h)
Pole speed:	92.628 mph (149.070 km/h)
Cautions:	9
Lead changes:	10
Margin-of-victory	7 laps +

==== Race 48: Portland Speedway (September 23) ====
The second race held on September 23 was located across the country from the first, being contested at the Portland Speedway in Portland, Oregon. It was won by Lloyd Dane.

The race was a combined race that was also counted as part of the 1956 NASCAR Pacific Coast Late Model Division season.

Stats
Winning driver:	Lloyd Dane
Winning team:	Lloyd Dane
Winning car make:	1956 Ford
Track description:	0.5-mile (0.80 km) paved short track oval
Laps:	250
Length:	125 miles (201 km)
Competitors:	19 drivers
Pole speed:	65.75 mph (105.81 km/h)
Cautions:	1
Lead changes:	3
Margin-of-victory:	1 lap +

==== Race 49: Columbia Speedway (September 29) ====
On September 29, Buck Baker won the season's 49th race, which was held at the Columbia Speedway in Cayce, South Carolina.

Stats
Winning driver:	Buck Baker
Winning team:	Kiekhaefer
Winning car make:	1956 Dodge
Track description:	0.5-mile (0.80 km) dirt short track oval
Laps:	200
Length:	100 miles (160 km)
Competitors:	18 drivers
Duration:	1:38:03
Avg. speed:	61.193 mph (98.481 km/h)
Pole speed:	61.94 mph (99.68 km/h)
Lead changes:	4

==== Race 50: Orange Speedway (September 30) ====
On September 30, Fireball Roberts won the season's 50th race, which was held at Orange Speedway in Hillsborough, North Carolina.

Stats
Winning driver:	Fireball Roberts
Winning team:	DePaolo
Winning car make:	1956 Ford
Track description:	0.9-mile (1.4 km) dirt short track oval
Laps:	110
Length:	99 miles (159 km)
Competitors:	23 drivers
Attendance:	7,200
Duration:	1:21:40
Avg. speed:	72.734 mph (117.054 km/h)
Pole speed:	88.067 mph (141.730 km/h)
Cautions:	4
Lead changes:	6

==== Race 51: Newport Speedway (October 7) ====
On October 7, Fireball Roberts won the season's 51st race, which was held at Newport Speedway in Newport, Tennessee.

Stats
Winning driver:	Fireball Roberts
Winning team:	DePaolo
Winning car make:	1956 Ford
Track description:	0.5-mile (0.80 km) paved short track oval
Laps:	200
Length:	100 miles (160 km)
Competitors:	22 drivers
Attendance	6,000
Duration:	1:37:36
Avg. speed:	61.475 mph (98.934 km/h)
Pole speed:	65.597 mph (105.568 km/h)
Cautions:	0
Lead changes:	2

==== Race 52: Charlotte Speedway (October 17) ====
On October 14, Buck Baker won the season's 52nd race, which was held at Charlotte Speedway in Charlotte, North Carolina.

Stats
Winning driver:	Buck Baker
Winning team:	Kiekhaefer
Winning car make:	1956 Chrysler
Track description:	0.750-mile (1.207 km) paved short track oval
Laps:	133
Length:	99.75 miles (160.53 km)
Competitors:	27 drivers
Attendance:	6,800
Duration:	1:22:49
Avg. speed:	72.268 mph (116.304 km/h)
Pole speed:	75.041 mph (120.767 km/h)
Lead changes:	2

==== Race 53: Cleveland County Fairgrounds (October 23) ====
On October 23, NASCAR held a 100 mile at the Cleveland County Fairgrounds in Shelby North Carolina. At the time, Herb Thomas led the standings by 246 points. Buck Baker won the race.

Stats
Winning driver:	Buck Baker
Winning team:	Kiekhaefer
Winning car make:	1956 Chrysler
Track description:	0.5-mile (0.80 km) paved short track oval
Laps:	200
Length:	100 miles (160 km)
Competitors:	26 drivers
Duration:	1:51:00
Avg. speed:	54.054 mph (86.991 km/h)
Pole speed:	58.479 mph (94.113 km/h)
Cautions	2
Margin-of-victory:	2 car-lengths

==== Race 54: "Old Dominion 400" at Martinsville Speedway (October 28) ====
On October 28, Jack Smith won the Old Dominion 400, which was held as the season's 54th race at the Martinsville Speedway in Martinsville, Virginia.

Stats
Winning driver:	Jack Smith
Winning team:	Kiekhaefer
Winning car make:	1956 Dodge
Track description:	0.5-mile (0.80 km) paved short track oval
Laps:	400
Length:	200 miles (320 km)
Competitors:	40 drivers
Attendance:	9,500
Duration:	3:16:17
Avg. speed:	61.136 mph (98.389 km/h)
Pole speed:	67.743 mph (109.022 km/h)
Cautions:	4
Lead changes:	7

==== Race 55: "Buddy Shuman 250" at Hickory Speedway (November 11) ====
On November 11, the Buddy Shuman 250 at the Hickory Speedway in Hickory, North Carolina was held as the season's' 55th race. It was won by Speedy Thompson before a crowd of 3,500 spectators.

Stats
Winning driver:	Speedy Thompson
Winning team:	Kiekhaefer
Winning car make:	1956 Chrysler
Track description:	0.4-mile (0.64 km) dirt short track oval
Laps:	250
Length:	100 miles (160 km)
Competitors:	22 drivers
Attendance:	3,500
Duration:	1:30:20
Avg. speed:	66.43 mph (106.91 km/h)
Pole speed:	68.378 mph (110.044 km/h)
Lead changes:	4
Margin-of-victory:	4 seconds

==== Race 56: Wilson Speedway (November 18) ====
On November 18, Buck Baker won the season's 56th and final race, which was held at the Wilson Speedway in Wilson, North Carolina.

Stats
Winning driver:	Buck Baker
Winning team:	Kiekhaefer
Winning car make:	1956 Chrysler
Track description:	0.5-mile (0.80 km) paved short track oval
Laps:	200
Length:	100 miles (160 km)
Competitors:	24 drivers
Duration:	1:58:35
Avg. speed:	50.597 mph (81.428 km/h)
Pole speed:	60.16 mph (96.82 km/h)
Margin-of-victory:	1 ft (0.30 m)

== Season standings ==
Glossary

- Driver: Driver's name
- Races: Number of starts for driver
- Win: Number of races won
- Top 5: Number of top 5 finishes
- Top 10: Number of top 10 finishes
- Poles: Poles won (won in qualifying only)
- Laps: Laps completed
- Laps led: Laps led
- Earnings: Total money won for the season (includes bonuses)
- AvSt: Average starting position
- AvFn: Average finishing position
- RAF: Number of times Running At Finish (DNFs = Races - RAF)
- Miles raced: Miles raced by driver
- LLF: Lead lap finishes
- Points: Driver's points total

	Driver	Races	Wins	Top 5	Top 10	Poles	Laps	Laps led	Earnings	AvSt	RAF	Miles raced	LLF	AvFn	Points (Note: There were discrepancies in the final point stands, with some sources saying Baker finished with 9,272 and others saying 9,252. Some sources also say that Herb Thomas finished second with Speedy Thompson finishing third, while other sources quote a reverse season finish.)
1	Buck Baker	48	14	31	39	12	8,495	1,466	$34,076	6.8	6.8	40	5,459.65	19	9,272
2	Herb Thomas	48	5	22	36	3	7,890	351	$19,351	7.5	8.4	36	5,209.65	6	8,568
3	Speedy Thompson	42	8	24	29	7	6,957	2,037	$27,169	5.1	9.7	27	4,646.33	14	8,328
4	Lee Petty	47	2	17	28	1	7,507	250	$15,337	9.6	10.2	32	4,953.95	6	8,324
5	Jim Paschal	42	1	17	27	1	6,652	211	$17,203	12.3	10.5	26	4,650.10	6	7,878
6	Billy Myers	42	2	13	22	1	6270	253	$15,829	9.4	11.9	25	4,231.03	7	6,920
7	Fireball Roberts	33	5	17	22	3	5,695	585	$14,741	9.8	11.6	22	3,789.00	10	5794
8	Ralph Moody	35	4	13	21	5	5,258	412	$15,492	8.1	12.3	20	3,505.65	11	5,548
9	Tim Flock	22	4	11	14	5	3,076	448	$15,768	6.7	9.3	14	2,695.88	7	5,062
10	Marvin Panch	20	1	10	13	1	3,298	230	$11,519	10.8	12.6	13	2,501.93	4	4,680
11	Rex White	24	0	3	14	1	4,240	0	$5,333	14.3	12.0	17	2,978.13	0	4,642
12	Johnny Allen	32	0	2	11	0	4,888	0	$4,558	20.0	14.9	20	3,352.25	0	3,924
13	Paul Goldsmith	9	1	4	6	0	2,192	182	$8,568	8.1	9.2	7	2,040.05	2	3,788
14	Gwyn Staley	22	0	5	13	0	3,503	0	$5,158	12.1	13.0	16	2,401.68	1	3,550
15	Joe Eubanks	26	0	7	13	2	3,398	107	$5,583	9.8	15.2	12	2,528.85	2	3,292
16	Joe Weatherly	17	0	6	12	1	2,743	88	$5,250	11.5	11.4	11	1,995.10	2	3,084
17	Bill Amick	13	0	7	10	0	2,446	9	$5,380	7.5	9.6	10	1,631.28	2	3,048
18	Jim Reed	11	0	5	5	2	1,550	286	$5,076	9.9	13.9	5	1,674.33	2	2,870
19	Tiny Lund	21	0	1	8	0	3,998	0	$2,810	19.0	13.2	16	2,476.28	0	2,754
20	Curtis Turner	13	1	4	5	0	1,984	286	$14,540	9.9	16.5	5	1,500.90	2	2,580
21	Jack Smith	15	1	1	6	0	2,669	234	$3,825	19.6	18.0	10	1,915.53	1	2,320
22	Billy Carden	23	0	0	4	0	2,831	0	$2,175	13.8	17.0	8	1,880.78	0	2,128
23	Lloyd Dane	10	2	5	9	0	1,706	33	$4,370	14.0	6.2	9	1,257.00	2	2,106
24	Frank Mundy	9	0	3	5	0	1,614	0	$3,585	13.9	15.1	6	1,581.80	2	1,856
25	Bobby Johns	9	0	0	3	0	1,537	0	$1,450	12.9	15.3	4	1,091.28	0	1,832
26	Bill Champion	14	0	0	4	0	2,297	0	$1,570	14.8	15.9	7	1,625.70	0	1,764
27	Blackie Pitt	27	0	0	5	0	2,702	0	$1,545	21.3	21.3	8	1,753.65	0	1,760
28	Harold Hardesty	9	0	2	6	0	1,761	0	$2,380	13.6	9.7	8	1,349.63	1	1,724
29	Al Watkins	14	0	0	4	0	2,065	0	$1,185	21.6	13.4	12	1,380.10	0	1,710
30	Chuck Meekins	7	0	3	6	0	1.241	0	$2,815	13.5	6.3	7	1,014.50	1	1,656
31	Harvey Henderson	18	0	0	4	0	2.477	0	$1,360	21.2	19.3	11	1,596.58	0	1,638
32	Eddie Pagan	8	1	4	4	2	1,366	241	$4,095	9.0	9.1	7	1,036.50	1	1,598
33	Pat Kirkwood	3	0	1	2	0	715	0	$2,025	15.3	11.0	2	927.63	0	1,540
34	Clyde Palmer	11	0	4	6	0	1,730	0	$2,755	15.9	15.3	9	1,380.63	3	1,516
35	Johnny Dodson	11	0	0	4	0	1,842	0	$1,450	20.4	16.8	8	1,379.15	0	1,508
36	Johnny Kieper	8	1	4	7	3	1,479	199	$3,250	7.9	5.8	8	917.25	3	1,506
37	Junior Johnson	13	0	1	1	1	1,131	60	$1,350	10.8	21.1	2	955.33	1	1,372
38	Bill Blair	9	0	0	4	0	1,275	0	$1,005	28.0	17.4	6	1,164.20	0	1,264
39	Ed Cole	12	0	0	1	0	1,526	0	$950	23.2	14.8	9	1,047.68	0	1,200
40	Brownie King	16	0	0	0	0	2,043	0	$925	22.6	18.1	9	1,366.35	0	1,140
41	Allen Adkins	6	0	1	3	0	1,016	0	$1,465	21.0	12.7	5	1,100.88	0	1,104
42	Bobby Keck	15	0	0	3	0	2,236	0	$1,250	23.5	15.8	12	1,308.50	0	1,076
43	Gordon Haines	7	0	2	4	0	1,067	0	$1,500	9.0	11.0	5	715.00	1	1,066
44	Bob Keefe	7	0	1	2	0	1,200	0	$1,040	13.3	10.4	6	778.50	0	1,066
45	Dick Beaty	15	0	0	3	0	1,513	0	$910	25.1	20.1	5	1,090.68	0	1,036
46	Jim Blomgren	6	0	0	1	0	841	0	$635	18.2	11.8	5	819.63	0	992
47	Ed Negre	5	0	2	4	0	936	1	$1,255	8.3	8.0	4	597.38	0	952
48	Jimmy Massey	7	0	3	4	0	1140	0	$1,545	15.9	9.1	6	716.60	0	950
49	Fonty Flock	7	1	1	4	2	629	134	$1,780	9.4	20.3	4	490.48	1	946
50	Ralph Liguori	16	0	0	3	0	1,382	0	$1,210	19.3	24.1	4	1,093.23	0	
51	Cotton Owens	8	0	1	4	0	1,151	0	$920	9.4	18.5	5	715.70	0	
52	Johnny Patterson	3	0	0	1	0	563	0	$425	18.3	15.7	2	581.63	0	
53	Pete Yow	11	0	0	2	0	1,221	0	$700	24.2	18.5	7	679.55	0	
54	Bill Hyde	6	0	0	3	0	770	0	$910	10.7	15.0	4	644.25	0	
55	Jimmie Lewallen	11	0	1	1	0	778	0	$1,150	16.7	22.8	2	560.53	0	
56	Roz Howard	1	0	0	0	0	343	0	$250	22.0	13.0	1	471.63	0	
57	Curley Barker	4	0	3	4	0	840	182	$1,395	13.7	5.0	3	420.00	1	
58	Royce Hagerty	6	1	1	2	1	1,017	28	$1,720	6.8	12.7	4	609.50	1	
59	Russ Truelove	5	0	0	2	0	544	0	$450	17.8	25.0	2	570.30	0	
60	Bobby Myers	8	0	0	2	0	980	0	$600	21.4	27.1	2	713.53	0	
61 (tie)	Bunk Moore	5	0	1	2	0	736	0	$845	16.2	13.6	3	415.80	0	
61 (tie)	Bud Erma	1	0	0	0	0	116	0	$50	13.0	17.0	0	58.00	0	
63	John Lindsay	5	0	0	1	0	715	0	$425	25.8	15.0	3	584.50	0	
64	Lou Sherman	5	0	1	2	0	837	0	$810	17.8	12.8	4	530.50	0	
65	Darvin Randahl	7	0	0	1	0	528	0	$710	22.3	19.4	2	448.10	0	
66	Harold Beal	5	0	1	3	0	781	0	$915	11.5	11.6	3	397.63	0	
67	Parnelli Jones	3	0	1	1	0	591	0	$1,705	9.3	21.7	1	563.88	1	
68	Bob Ross	3	0	0	2	0	601	0	$575	10.0	9.7	2	418.00	0	
69	Al Keller	4	0	1	2	0	482	0	$1,300	15.3	15.0	2	394.60	1	
70	Dink Widenhouse	7	0	1	3	0	734	0	$940	19.3	21.4	3	535.45	0	
71	Art Watts	6	0	0	2	0	935	37	$525	14.6	14.7	4	551.88	0	
72	Erick Erickson	5	0	0	1	0	736	0	$365	14.2	14.6	5	638.63	0	
73	Billy Rafter	9	0	0	1	0	1140	0	$975	17.9	17.3	4	623.40	0	
74	Ray Chaike	3	0	0	0	0	554	0	$225	34.0	15.0	3	339.00	0	
75	George Cork	4	0	0	0	0	905	0	$375	29.7	17.3	3	618.50	0	
76	George Green	6	0	0	0	0	867	0	$4,550	18.0	14.3	4	468.10	0	
77	Bob Flock	4	0	1	1	0	442	0	$485	14.0	15.8	1	396.50	0	
78	Bob Duell	6	0	1	1	0	642	0	$670	13.3	30.2	1	442.75	0	
79	Ken Milligan	4	0	0	1	0	347	0	$300	28.5	13.5	4	266.50	0	
80	Sherman Clark	5	0	0	2	0	405	0	$425	13.8	19.8	2	428.00	0	
81	Emanuel Zevakis	6	0	0	0	0	772	0	$475	34.8	26.7	3	826.85	0	
82	Sherman Utsman	5	0	0	1	0	948	0	$475	19.8	24.2	2	800.63	0	
83	Bill Walker	2	0	0	1	0	418	0	$600	18.0	10.0	2	328.00	0	
84	Bob Welborn	6	0	0	2	0	973	0	$650	13.5	21.3	4	473.40	0	
85	Ernie Young	5	0	0	0	0	419	0	$330	21.0	21.6	2	442.63	0	
86	Walt Schubert	4	0	0	1	0	413	0	$375	34.8	19.5	3	323.50	0	
87	Jim Cook	6	0	1	1	0	663	0	$540	15.0	19.0	4	637.88	0	
88	Bill Moore	6	0	0	2	0	633	0	$485	10.3	20.3	2	574.00	0	
89	George Seeger	2	0	0	1	0	205	0	$400	19.0	12.0	2	322.00	0	
90	Charlie Jackson	5	0	0	2	0	635	0	$260	20.6	15.6	2	335.55	0	
91	Bob Waddell	8	0	0	0	0	490	0	$335	17.1	20.6	2	299.40	0	
92	Ted Cannady	6	0	0	0	0	814	0	$260	24.0	19.7	4	484.00	0	
93	Charles Blewitt	2	0	0	0	0	411	0	$200	28.0	14.0	2	326.50	0	
94	Chuck Stevenson	1	1	1	1	0	80	54	$1,570	2.0	1.0	1	200.00	1	
95	Dick Allwine	2	0	0	0	0	294	0	$200	25.5	23.0	1	294.00	0	
96	C.H. Dingler	3	0	0	0	0	181	0	$200	17.3	16.3	1	238.50	0	
97	Carl Hammill	2	0	0	0	0	321	0	$160	19.0	12.5	2	321.00	0	
98	Johnny Mantz	1	0	1	1	0	79	0	$1,130	5.0	3.0	1	197.50	0	
99	Mel Larson	6	0	0	1	0	504	0	$385	26.2	20.7	3	471.00	0	
100	Bill Widenhouse	6	0	1	1	0	511	0	$460	20.2	28.3	1	411.13	0	
101	Bob Korf	1	0	0	1	0	36	0	$400	6.0	8.0	1	147.60	0	
102	Shorty York	1	0	0	0	0	336	0	$130	46.0	20.0	1	462.00	0	
103	Vince Cougineri	1	0	0	0	0	256	0	$150	23.0	12.0	1	256.00	0	
105	Jim Graham	3	0	1	1	0	317	0	$595	9.0	11.7	2	173.13	1	
106	Fred Johnson	1	0	0	1	0	60	0	$325	15.0	9.0	1	246.00	0	
107	Bob Havemann	4	0	0	1	0	496	0	$290	12.3	17.5	3	366.25	0	
108	Pete Stewart	3	0	0	0	0	756	0	$235	25.0	14.7	2	355.90	0	
109	Jack Tykarski	1	0	0	0	0	250	0	$225	20.0	13.0	1	250.00	0	
110	Donald Thomas	3	0	0	1	0	165	0	200	28.7	18.7	2	113.50	0	
111	Doug Cox	3	0	1	2	1	511	0	$460	6.3	13.3	1	230.80	0	
112	Jim Rhoades	5	0	0	1	0	454	0	$335	24.5	22.2	0	340.00	0	
113	Bill West	2	0	0	0	0	291	0	$150	22.0	17.5	2	405.00	0	
114	Johnny Roberts	4	0	0	0	0	461	0	$210	17.8	17.0	3	215.00	0	
115	Cecil Lassiter	1	0	0	0	0	235	0	$100	29.0	15.0	1	235.00	0	
116	John McVitty	4	0	0	1	0	431	0	$250	17.8	17.3	2	228.25	0	
117	Banjo Matthews	1	0	0	0	0	$149	0	$200	17.0	12.0	1	223.50	0	
118	Eddie Skinner	6	0	0	0	0	427	0	$200	32.3	21.3	2	241.70	0	
119	Nolan Swift	2	0	0	1	0	174	0	$175	16.0	15.0	1	155.50	0	
120	Fred Lorenzen	7	0	0	0	0	778	0	$235	16.0	21.9	3	419.70	0	
121	Dave Terrell	5	0	0	1	0	363	0	$260	17.8	21.6	1	234.75	0	
122	Frank Jamison	3	0	0	1	0	315	0	$350	13.0	21.0	1	228.50	0	
123	Jack Radtke	1	0	0	0	0	0	0	$110	58.0	13.0	1	0.00	0	
124	Russ Graham	2	0	0	0	0	153	0	$100	31.0	40.0	1	162.75	0	
125	Pete Diviney	2	0	0	0	0	378	0	$150	18.0	13.5	1	189.00	0	
126	Jesse James Taylor	3	0	0	0	0	269	0	$250	37.0	32.7	2	185.88	0	
127	Danny Letner	6	0	0	0	0	585	0	$410	22.8	32.0	2	705.38	0	
128	Pee Wee Jones	3	0	0	0	0	549	0	$125	24.3	35.0	1	327.00	0	
129	Don Carr	5	0	0	0	0	499	0	$210	17.6	26.2	0	363.50	0	
130 (tie)	Wayne Fielden	2	0	0	1	0	361	0	$200	14.0	11.0	2	180.50	0	
130 (tie)	Fred Frazier	2	0	0	1	0	288	0	$200	12.5	11.0	1	144.00	0	
132	Benny DeRosier	4	0	0	0	0	236	0	$200	36.0	27.8	1	236.00	0	
133	Jim Sills	1	0	0	0	0	76	0	$150	23.0	11.0	1	190.00	0	
134	Ted Sweeney	3	0	0	0	0	377	0	$150	16.3	16.0	3	196.25	0	
135	Rat Garner	2	0	0	0	0	657	0	$100	23.5	14.5	1	436.50	0	
136	Arden Mounts	3	0	0	0	0	545	0	$210	35.3	37.7	2	380.50	0	
137	Possum Jones	1	0	0	0	0	336	0	$110	65.0	22.0	1	462.00	0	
138	Bob Ruppert	2	0	0	0	0	164	0	$150	17.0	18.5	1	278.00	0	
139	Roy Bentley	3	0	0	0	0	329	0	$200	24.3	28.7	1	292.25	0	
140 (tie)	Jack Goodwin	1	0	0	0	0	58	0	$200	21.0	15.0	0	237.80	0	
140 (tie)	Joe Guide	1	0	0	0	0	141	0	$200	29.0	15.0	1	211.50	0	
140 (tie)	Gene Simpson	1	0	0	0	0	0	0	$100	55.0	15.0	1	0.00	0	
143	Chester Barron	2	0	0	1	0	207	0	$150	16.5	13.0	1	151.50	0	
144	Jimmy Pardue	2	0	0	0	0	170	0	$200	19.5	13.0	1	85.00	0	
145	Gene Goodman	1	0	0	0	0	130	0	$75	26.0	16.0	1	195.00	0	
146	Ralph Earnhardt	1	0	1	1	1	250	15	$625	1.0	2.0	1	100.00	1	
147	Joe Prismo	1	0	0	1	0	246	0	$200		7.0	1	123.00	0	
148	Peck Peckham	3	0	0	0	0	301	0	$225	55.0	36.7	2	224.63	0	
149	Jim Donovan	2	0	0	0	0	247	0	$200	18.0	14.5	2	152.25	0	
150	John Fite	3	0	0	0	0	388	0	$200	21.7	18.3	2	218.00	0	
151	Larry Flynn	2	0	0	0	0	402	0	$250	35.5	27.5	0	395.25	0	
152	Red Farmer	3	0	0	0	0	324	0	$125	24.3	22.7	1	162.00	0	
153	Bill Osborne	1	0	0	0	0	128	0	$75	19.0	17.0	0	192.00	0	
154	Bill Sullivan	2	0	0	0	0	278	0	$100	24.0	15.0	2	153.50	0	
155	Howard Phillippi	4	0	0	0	0	501	0	$125	23.0	21.3	2	398.13	0	
156 (tie)	John Dodd, Jr.	4	0	0	1	0	372	0	$100	16.7	20.5	1	180.40	0	
156 (tie)	Dick Blackwell	3	0	0	0	0	192	0	$60	41.7	29.7	2	153.75	0	
158	Don Porter	3	0	0	0	0	179	0	$100	13.7	19.0	1	140.13	0	
159	Jack Montgangelo	1	0	0	0	0	206	0	$100	31.0	20.0	1	206.00	0	
160	Wally Gervais	3	0	0	0	0	110	0	$140	24.5	24.0	1	81.50	0	
161	Joy Fair	2	0	0	1	0	192	0	$100	25.0	36.5	1	96.00	0	
162	Jack Choquette	2	0	0	1	0	173	0	$100	10.5	38.5	1	86.50	0	
163	Carl Anderson	1	0	0	1	0	173	0	$200	14.0	7.0	1	86.50	0	
164	Ned Jarrett	2	0	0	0	0	244	0	$60	16.0	16.5	1	139.95	0	
165	Chuck Mahoney	2	0	0	0	0	219	0	$200	13.0	16.5	0	109.50	0	
166	Len Sutton	1	0	0	0	0	238	0	$150	9.0	11.0	1	119.00	0	
167	Chuck Akerblade	1	0	0	0	0	238	0	$100		11.0	1	119.00	0	
168	Kenneth Wagner	3	0	0	0	0	112	0	$60	37.7	31.3	1	64.00	0	
169	Ben Gregory	1	0	0	0	0	74	0	$75	25.0	17.0	1	185.00	0	
170	Buzz Woodward	1	0	0	0	0	120	0	$50	29.0	16.0	1	120.00	0	
171 (tie)	Clyde Mitchell	1	0	0	0	0	216	0	$50	18.0	19.0	1	216.00	0	
171 (tie)	Charlie Scott	1	0	0	0	0	0	0	$75	14.0	19.0	1	0.00	0	
173	Harvey Eakin	2	0	0	0	0	278	0	$100	37.0	22.5	0	278.00	0	
174 (tie)	Bill Bowman	1	0	0	1	0	181	0	$100	18.0	9.0	1	90.50	0	
174 (tie)	Sam Steers	1	0	0	1	0	119	0	$125	4.0	9.0	1	74.38	0	
176	Doug Yates	2	0	0	0	0	86	0	$150	30.0	41.5	0	90.25	0	
177	Chub Williams	1	0	0	0	0	225	0	$75	16.0	13.0	1	112.50	0	
178 (tie)	Whitey Norman	1	0	0	1	0	150	0	$100	24.0	10.0	1	93.75	0	
178 (tie)	Richard Riley	1	0	0	1	0	141	0	$100	17.0	10.0	1	70.50	0	
180	Fred Hunt	2	0	0	0	0	118	0	$100	7.5	18.0	0	98.50	0	
181	Jim Wilson	2	0	0	0	0	180	0	$50	16.5	43.0	1	90.00	0	
182 (tie)	Bob Esposito	1	0	0	0	0	189	0	$100	20.0	11.0	1	94.50	0	
182 (tie)	Tootle Estes	1	0	0	0	0	178	0	$100	13.0	11.0	1	89.00	0	
182 (tie)	Jake Hatcher	1	0	0	0	0	172	0	$100	13.0	11.0	1	86.00	0	
182 (tie)	Harold Kite	1	0	0	0	0	178	0	$110	13.0	11.0	1	89.00	0	
182 (tie)	Charlie Mincey	1	0	0	0	0	91	0	$75	19.0	11.0	1	91.00		
182 (tie)	Jerry Morese	1	0	0	0	0	184	0	$100		11.0	1	92.00		
182 (tie)	Bill Thurber	1	0	0	0	0	173	0	$75	23.0	11.0	1	86.50		
189	Reds Kagle	2	0	0	0	0	202	0	$60	23.0	19.0	1	84.65		
190	Ken Love	3	0	0	0	0	278	0	$200	55.3	36.3	1	328.25		
191	Bill Parks	2	0	0	0	0	205	0	$110	24.5	25.5	1	205.00		
192	Johnny Coy	1	0	0	0	0	197	0	$175	32.0	22.0	1	197.00		
193 (tie)	Frank Edwards	1	0	0	0	0	182	0	$100	23.0	12.0	1	91.00		
193 (tie)	Robert Slensby	1	0	0	0	0	117	0	$100	14.0	12.0	1	58.50		
193 (tie)	Jack Zink	1	0	0	0	0	10	0	$100	7.0	12.0	0	5.00		
196	Earl Moss	2	0	0	0	0	84	0	$125	16.0	19.0	0	66.80		
197	Al Pombo	2	0	0	0	0	334	0	$90	9.0	21.5	0	273.00		
198	Bill Stammer	2	0	0	0	0	131	2	$140	9.5	23.5	1	240.50		
199	Dick Getty	3	0	0	0	0	186	0	$90	19.5	24.0	1	217.00		
200	Bill Tanner	2	0	0	0	0	230	0	$75	27.0	27.5	1	230.00		
201 (tie)	Bill Massey	1	0	0	0	0	176	0	$100	22.0	13.0	1	88.00		
201 (tie)	Chet Thomson	1	0	0	0	0	94	0	$50	17.0	13.0	1	94.00		
203	Bud Geiselman	2	0	0	0	0	173	0	$50	25.5	25.5	0	173.00		
204	Don Oldenberg	3	0	0	0	0	495	0	$200	21.3	32.3	1	341.00		
205	Dave Lundman	1	0	0	0	0	0	0	$60	66.0	21.0	0	0.00		
206	Lou Spears	3	0	0	0	0	406	0	$175	46.5	26.0	1	495.13		
207 (tie)	Sonny Black	2	0	0	0	0	79	0	$50	46.0	47.0	1	79.00		
207 (tie)	Dick Burns	1	0	0	0	0	148	0	$50	19.0	14.0	1	74.00		
207 (tie)	Freddy Fryar	1	0	0	0	0	183	0	$100	15.0	14.0	1	91.50		
207 (tie)	Lucky Long	1	0	0	0	0	180	0	$50	23.0	14.0	0	90.00		
207 (tie)	Chuck Mesler	1	0	0	0	0	175	0	$100	21.0	14.0	1	87.50		
212 (tie)	Don Hildreth	1	0	0	0	0	140	0	$50	10.0	15.0	1	70.00		
212 (tie)	James Jones	1	0	0	0	0	169	0	$100	21.0	15.0	1	84.50		
212 (tie)	Jess Nelson	1	0	0	0	0	88	0	$50	18.0	15.0	1	88.00		
215	Fred Harb	3	0	0	0	0	231	0	$100	22.3	22.0	1	100.75		
216	Joel Million	2	0	0	0	0	175	0	$50	27.5	42.5	1	87.50		
217	Gene Bergin	2	0	0	0	0	384	0	$310	32.5	34.5	1	499.50		
218	Al White	2	0	0	0	0	330	0	$200	14.0	13.5	0	165.00		
219	Sal Tovella	1	0	0	0	0	142	0	$100	24.0	16.0	0	71.00		
220	Lyle Matlock	2	0	0	0	0	142	0	$50	11.5	21.0	1	73.25		
221	Fred Steinbroner	1	0	0	0	0	72	0	$40	27.0	21.0	1	180.00		
222	Bill Bade	1	0	0	0	0	214	0	$40	24.0	22.0	1	214.00		
223 (tie)	Cy Spencer	1	0	0	0	0	34	0	$50	17.0	17.0	0	17.00		
223 (tie)	Bun Emery	1	0	0	0	0	364	0	$200	40.0	18.0	1	182.00		
225	Jack D. McCoy	1	0	0	0	0	125	0	$50	26.0	20.0	1	125.00		
226	Ray Hendrick	2	0	0	0	0	177	0	$100	31.5	39.0	0	231.13		
227	Nick Lari	1	0	0	0	0	155	0	$50	25.0	18.0	1	77.50		
228	Bob Stanclift	1	0	0	0	0	72	0	$40	34.0	22.0	1	180.00		
229	Nace Mattingly	3	0	1	1	0	311	0	$410	29.0	29.3	1	219.38		
230	Charlie Cregar	2	0	0	0	0	74	0	$0	23.5	37.5	0	37.00		
231 (tie)	Lyle Scott	1	0	0	0	0	0	0	$60	19.0	23.0	0	0.00		
231 (tie)	Joe Stewart	1	0	0	0	0	57	0	$50	25.0	23.0	0	85.50		
233	Tom Lupo	1	0	0	0	0	313	0	$50	43.0	35.0	1	430.38		
234	Judge Rider	1	0	0	0	0	258	0	$50	67.0	41.0	1	354.75		
235	Wade Fields	1	0	0	0	0	244	0	$50	52.0	42.0	1	335.50		
236	Bill Brown	1	0	0	0	0	235	0	$250	56.0	43.0	0	323.13		
237 (tie)	Ray Baxter	1	0	0	0	0	55	0	$50	28.0	19.0	0	55.00		
237 (tie)	Jim Mundy	1	0	0	0	0	104	0	$50	24.0	19.0	1	78.00		
237 (tie)	Andy Wilson	1	0	0	0	0	59	0	$50	13.0	19.0	0	29.50		
240	John Lansaw	2	0	0	0	0	133	0	$35	23.5	24.0	0	123.50		
241	Don Hamilton	2	0	0	0	0	70	0	$0	23.0	23.0	0	35.00		
242	Ed Brown	1	0	0	0	0	72	0	$55	7.0	23.0	1	180.00		
243	Sonny Walters	1	0	0	0	0	20	0	$50	20.0	23.0	0	20.00		
244 (tie)	Glen Wood	3	0	0	0	0	177	0	$50	21.0	44.3	0	88.50		
244 (tie)	Bob Chauncey	1	0	0	0	0	78	0	$50	16.0	21.0	0	39.00		
246 (tie)	Bob Francy	1	0	0	0	0	91	0	$0	21.0	21.0	0	45.50		
246 (tie)	Dan Galullo	1	0	0	0	0	34	0	$25		21.0	0	17.00		
248 (tie)	Cotton Priddy	1	0	0	0	0	38	0	$50	21.0	24.0	0	57.00		
248 (tie)	Frank Secrist	1	0	0	0	0	207	0	$40	23.0	24.0	1	207.00		
250	Tom Pistone	3	0	0	0	0	355	0	$125	13.3	29.0	0	157.60		
251	Buck Hall	1	0	0	0	0	11	0	$25	22.0	22.0	0	9.90		
252	Elgin Holmes	1	0	0	0	0	71	0	$50	35.0	24.0	1	177.50		
253	Ray Thompson	2	0	0	0	0	12	0	$50	50.5	26.5	0	12.00		
254	Bill Vesler	1	0	0	0	0	41	0	$50	19.0	23.0	0	20.50		
255	Elton Hildreth	1	0	0	0	0	122	0	$75	15.0	28.0	0	122.00		
256	Mario Rossi	1	0	0	0	0	97	0	$60	24.0	31.0	0	97.00		
257	Ronnie Herra	1	0	0	0	0	34	0	$50	30.0	40.0	0	34.00		
258	Corey Benjamin	1	0	0	0	0	34	0	$50	43.0	41.0	0	34.00		
259	Francis Dionne	1	0	0	0	0	2	0	$150	44.0	44.0	0	2.00		
260	Pat Zocano	1	0	0	0	0	0	0	$60	76.0	25.0	0	0.00		
261 (tie)	Jim Cushman	1	0	0	0	0	0	0	$50	45.0	27.0	0	0.00		
261 (tie)	Herb Gibson	1	0	0	0	0	21	0	$50	18.0	27.0	0	31.50		
263 (tie)	Reggie Ausmus	1	0	0	0	0	138	0	$40	37.0	29.0	0	138.00		
263 (tie)	Arnold Denley	1	0	0	0	0	5	0	$150	24.0	29.0	0	7.50		
265	David Ezell	1	0	0	0	0	0	0	$50	54.0	30.0	0	0.00		
267 (tie)	Joe Bill O'Dell	1	0	0	0	0	37	0	$60	35.0	32.0	0	18.50		
267 (tie)	Chuck Hanson	1	0	0	0	0	66	0	$50	27.0	36.0	0	66.00		
269 (tie)	Pat Grogan	2	0	0	0	0	223	0	$50	37.0	41.0	0	298.75		
269 (tie)	Don Bailey	1	0	0	0	0	0	0	$25	41.0	35.0	0	0.00		
271 (tie)	Ole Anderson	1	0	0	0	0	9	0	$40	36.0	37.0	0	9.00		
271 (tie)	Charles Oldham	1	0	0	0	0	0	0	$25	61.0	37.0	0	0.00		
273	Bud Palmer	1	0	0	0	0	0	0	$0	69.0	45.0	0	0.00		
274	W. H. Atkinson	1	0	0	0	0	0	0	$0	48.0	51.0	0	0.00		
275	Gene White	1	0	0	0	0	0	0	$0	42.0	53.0	0	0.00		
276	Tommy Thompson	1	0	0	0	0	0	0	$0	33.0	58.0	0	0.00		
277	Ed Kretz	1	0	0	0	0	10	0	$0	4.0	60.0	0	41.00		
278	Johnny Osteen	1	0	0	0	0	0	0	$0	72.0	66.0	0	0.00		
279	Dick Linder	1	0	0	0	0	0	0	$0	34.0	69.0	0	0.00		
280	Buddy Krebs	1	0	0	0	0	0	0	$0	20.0	74.0	0	0.00		
281	Jimmy Mairs	1	0	0	0	0	0	0	$0	64.0	75.0	0	0.00		
282	Kenny Paulsen	1	0	0	0	0	40	0	$50	18.0	24.0	0	20.00		
283	Don Stanyer	1	0	0	0	0	70	0	$40	26.0	25.0	1	175.00		
284	Bill Stacy	1	0	0	0	0	70	0	$50	13.0	26.0	1	175.00		
285	Tom Francis	1	0	0	0	0	68	0	$40	31.0	28.0	1	170.00		
286	Herb Crawford	1	0	0	0	0	63	0	$40	36.0	30.0	1	157.50		
287	Fred Bince	1	0	0	0	0	3	0	$30	30.0	37.0	0	7.50		
288	Buzz Auckland	1	0	0	0	0	43	0	$0	30.0	33.0	0	43.00		
289	Leroy DeShields	1	0	0	0	0	75	0	$35	28.0	25.0	0	75.00		
290	Dutch Munsinger	1	0	0	0	0	69	0	$25	17.0	26.0	0	69.00		
291	Jim Stapley	1	0	0	0	0	51	0	$0	19.0	29.0	0	51.00		
292 (tie)	Ray Crowley	1	0	0	0	0	36	0	$100	25.0	25.0	0	18.00		
292 (tie)	Louis Headley	1	0	0	0	0	1	0	$25		25.0	0	0.50		
292 (tie)	Ed Massey	1	0	0	0	0	76	0	$0	17.0	25.0	0	38.00		
295 (tie)	John Dodd, Sr.	1	0	0	0	0	28	0	$0	19.0	27.0	0	14.00		
295 (tie)	Jack Richardson	1	0	0	0	0	8	0	$0	13.0	27.0	0	4.00		
295 (tie)	Johnny Zeke	1	0	0	0	0	49	0	$0	20.0	27.0	0	24.50		
298	Owen Loggins	1	0	0	0	0	0	0	$0	28.0	28.0	0	0.00		
299	Ralph Murray	1	0	0	0	0	2	0	$0	28.0	29.0	0	1.00		
300	George Mantooth	1	0	0	0	0	43	0	$0	31.0	31.0	0	21.50		
	Joe Bill McGraw	5	0	0	1	0	424	0	$500	18.2	14.0	2	211.30		
	Scotty Cain	4	0	1	4	0	701	0	$1,235	14.5	7.0	4	697.50		
	Jim Watkins	3	0	0	0	0	156	0	$300	16.7	15.3	0	69.40		
	Curley Hatfield	2	0	0	0	0	191	0	$150	18.0	15.0	1	156.00		
	Lenny Page	1	0	0	1	0	180	0	$250	18.0	6.0	1	90.00		
	Augie Howerton	1	0	0	1	0	181	0	$150	10.0	8.0	1	90.50		
	Bennie Rakestraw	1	0	0	1	0	156	0	$100	18.0	9.0	1	78.00		
	Hoss Kagle	1	0	0	0	0	135	0	$100	16.0	11.0	1	135.00		
	Ken Seibel	1	0	0	0	0	134	0	$100	13.0	12.0	1	134.00		
	Joe Sykes	1	0	0	0	0	166	0	$100	21.0	12.0	1	83.00		
	Hank Trice	1	0	0	0	0	73	0	$50	13.0	13.0	0	36.50		
	Ken Johnson	1	0	0	0	0	127	0	$100	7.0	14.0	0	63.50		
	Larry Marx	1	0	0	0	0	78	0	$100	13.0	16.0	0	39.00		
	Wilbur Rakestraw	1	0	0	0	0	29	0	$100	12.0	16.0	0	14.50		
	Millard Wright	1	0	0	0	0	178	0	$50	15.0	16.0	1	89.00		
	Bill Poor	1	0	0	0	0	364	0	$200	30.0	17.0	1	182.00		
	Jack Williams	1	0	0	0	0	94	0	$50	25.0	17.0	1	58.75		
	Bob Carroll	1	0	0	0	0	62	0	$50	3.0	18.0	0	31.00		
	Dick Denise	1	0	0	0	0	41	0	$50	19.0	19.0	0	20.50		
	Elmo Langley	1	0	0	0	0	338	0	$140	42.0	19.0	1	464.75		
	Larry Odo	1	0	0	0	0	361	0	$150	18.0	19.0	1	180.50		
	Ansel Rakestraw	1	0	0	0	0	48	0	$100	26.0	19.0	1	196.80		
	Spook Crawford	1	0	0	0	0	13	0	$50	17.0	20.0	0	6.50		
	Joe Lee Johnson	1	0	0	0	0	0	0	$0	22.0	22.0	0	0.00		
	Norman Schihl	1	0	0	0	0	349	0	$150	38.0	23.0	1	174.50		
	Art Binkley	1	0	0	0	0	349	0	$150	36.0	24.0	1	174.50		
	Len Fraker	1	0	0	0	0	10	0	$30	20.0	35.0	0	25.00		
	Arley Scranton	1	0	0	0	0	9	0	$30	37.0	36.0	0	22.50		
	Larry Frank	1	0	0	0	0	77	0	$50	26.0	38.0	0	38.50		
	Bill Lutz	1	0	0	0	0	63	0	$50	10.0	39.0	0	31.50		
	Tommy Herzberg	1	0	0	0	0	0	0	$0	62.0	49.0	0	0.00		
	Al Tasnady	1	0	0	0	0	0	0	$0	23.0	77.0	0	0.00		
	John Hamby	1	0	0	0	0	0	0	$0	39.0	78.0	0	0.00		

== Bibliography ==
- Fleischman, Bill; Pearce, Al (2004). "11. At A Glance; 1956". The Unauthorized NASCAR Fan Guide 2004 (10 ed.). Canton, MI: Checkered Flag Press; Visible Ink Press. ISBN 0-681-27587-1. OCLC 244151351.
- Fielden, Greg (2015). Bryan Hallman and editors of Consumer Guide Automotive (ed.). NASCAR the complete history (7th ed.). Lincolnwood IL: Publications International Ltd. p. 97. ISBN 978-1-4508-9994-9.
- Fielden, Greg (1993). "All". Forty Years of Stock Car Racing The Beginning 1949-1958 (Revised 3rd ed.). USA: Garfield Press. p. 336. ISBN 0-9621580-2-X.
- Fielden, Greg (1990). Ramblin' Ragtops The History of NACAR's Fabulous Convertible Division (1st ed.). USA: Garfield Press. p. 143. ISBN 0-9621580-6-2.
