= 1956 NASCAR Grand National Series race at California State Fairgrounds =

1956
Race details
- Race 32 of 56 in the 1956 NASCAR Grand National Series season Race 17 of 32 in the 1956 NASCAR Pacific Coast Late Model Division season
- Date: July 8, 1956
- Location: California State Fairgrounds, Sacramento
- Course: Permanent racing facility
- Course length: 1.0 miles (1.6 km)
- Distance: 100 laps, 100 mi (160 km)
- Average speed: 74.074 miles per hour (119.211 km/h)

Pole position
Driver	Eddie Pagan	

Winner
	Lloyd Dane	Lloyd Dane

On July 8, 1956, the 32nd race of the 1956 NASCAR Grand National Series was held at the California State Fairgrounds in Sacramento, California. It was the first time that NASCAR's top division raced at the track, and the race was won by Lloyd Dane.

== Overview ==
The July 8 race contested at California State Fairgrounds in Sacramento, California was the 32nd race of the 1956 NASCAR Grand National Series. It was won by Loyd Dane. It was the first NASCAR Grand National Series race to ever be held at the track. NASCAR's top division would race there annually through its 1961 season.

The race was a combination race with the NASCAR Pacific Coast Late Model Division, so Dane was credited as the winner in both series.

== Race statistics ==
Stats
Winning driver:	Lloyd Dane
Winning team:	Lloyd Dane
Winning car make:	1956 Mercury
Track description:	1-mile (1.6 km) dirt oval
Laps:	100
Length:	100 miles (160 km)
Competitors:	21 drivers
Duration:	1:21:00
Avg. speed:	74.074 mph (119.211 km/h)
Pole speed:	76.612 mph (123.295 km/h)
Margin-of-victory:	2 car-lengths

== Results ==
Legend:

- Finish: Finishing place of driver
- Start Pos.: Starting position of driver
- Car #: Car number
- Driver: Driver's name
- Sponsor: Sponsor of driver
- Owner/Team: Owner/team for which driver drove
- Car make: Make of car driven
- Laps: Laps completed
- Money: Earnings for race
- Status: If car was running at end of race, or otherwise the reason it was out of the race

Summary by driver
Finish	Start Pos.	Car #	Driver	Sponsor	Owner/ Team	Car make	Laps	Money	Status
1	15	225	Lloyd Dane		Lloyd Dane	'56 Mercury	100	1100	running
2	14	56	Chuck Meekins	Chevrolet	Jim Rush	'56 Chevrolet	100	700	running
3	3	88	Johnny Kieper		Johnny Kieper	'56 Oldsmobile	100	475	running
4	7	77	Gordon Haines		Herb Eberhart	'56 Dodge	100	365	running
5	10	1	Clyde Palmer		Tom Roady	'56 Dodge	99	310	running
6	9	52	Harold Hardesty		John Ross	'56 Chevrolet	99	250	running
7	5	14	Bob Keefe		Harold McClure	'56 Ford	99	200	running
8	2	47	Bob Havemann	Bernie Anderson	Bob Havemann	'56 Pontiac	99	150	running
9	8	561	Bill Moore		Bill Moore	'56 Pontiac	99	100	running
10	11	188	Jim Blomgren		Lorrin Bates	'56 Ford	98	100	running
11	6	9	Jim Cook		Floyd Johnson	'56 Pontiac	97	75	running
12	13	33	Carl Hammill		Carl Hammill	'56 Chevrolet	95	60	running
13	17	98	Chet Thomson		Chet Thomson	'56 Mercury	94	50	running
14	21	55	Eddie Skinner		Beryl Jackson	'54 Oldsmobile	92	50	running
15	18	8	Jess Nelson		Wiliam Bowden	'54 Dodge	88	50	running
16	19	78	Don Porter		Nick Porter	'55 Studebaker	88	50	running
17	12	26	Fred Hunt		Fred Hunt	'55 Chevrolet	79	50	transmission
18	1	45	Eddie Pagan	Ford	Eddie Pagan	'56 Ford	31	50	overheating
19	16	34	Sherman Clark		Sherman Clark	'55 Chevrolet	8	50	crash
20	20	41	Ernie Young		Walt Palozi	'56 Pontiac	2	50	piston
21	4	30	Jim Graham	Fury Racers	Jack Chatenay	'56 Plymouth	0		crash

Preceded by untitled race at Peidmont Interstate Fairgrounds	NASCAR Grand National Series season 1956	Succeeded by untitled race at Soldier Field
