= Ken Love =

American racing driver

- Born: May 30, 1928; Chicago Heights, Illinois, U.S.
- Died: June 19, 2004 (aged 76)

NASCAR Cup Series career
- 7 races run over 3 years
- Best finish: 78th (1958)
- First race: 1956 Race 6 (Daytona Beach)
- Last race: 1958 Nashville 200 (Nashville)
| Wins | Top tens | Poles |
|---|---|---|
| 0 | 0 | 0 |

NASCAR Convertible Division career
- 1 race run over 1 year
- First race: 1958 Race 1 (Daytona Beach)
| Wins | Top tens | Poles |
|---|---|---|
| 0 | 0 | 0 |

Ken Love (May 30, 1928 – June 19, 2004) was an American stock car racing driver. Love competed in seven NASCAR Grand National Series races between 1956 and 1958. He also competed in one NASCAR Convertible Series race in 1958.

== Motorsports career results ==
=== NASCAR ===
(key) (Bold – Pole position awarded by qualifying time. Italics – Pole position earned by points standings or practice time. * – Most laps led.)

==== Grand National Series ====
NASCAR Grand National Series results
| Year | Team | No. | Make | 1 | 2 | 3 | 4 | 5 | 6 | 7 | 8 | 9 | 10 | 11 | 12 | 13 | 14 | 15 | 16 | 17 | 18 | 19 | 20 | 21 | 22 | 23 | 24 | 25 | 26 | 27 | 28 | 29 | 30 | 31 | 32 | 33 | 34 | 35 | 36 | 37 | 38 | 39 | 40 | 41 | 42 | 43 | 44 | 45 | 46 | 47 | 48 | 49 | 50 | 51 | 52 | 53 | 54 | 55 | 56 | NGNC | Pts | Ref |
|---|---|---|---|---|---|---|---|---|---|---|---|---|---|---|---|---|---|---|---|---|---|---|---|---|---|---|---|---|---|---|---|---|---|---|---|---|---|---|---|---|---|---|---|---|---|---|---|---|---|---|---|---|---|---|---|---|---|---|---|---|---|---|
| 1956 | Ken Love | 640 | Ford | HCY | CLT | WSS | PBS | ASF | DAB; 29 | PBS | WIL | ATL | NWS | LAN | RCH | CLB | CON | GPS | HCY | HBO | MAR | LIN | CLT | POR | EUR | NYF | MER | MAS | CLT | MCF | POR | AWS | | | | | | | | | | | | | | | DAR; 56 | CSH | CLT | LAN | POR | CLB | HBO | NWP | CLT | CCF | MAR | HCY | WIL | 192nd | - | |
| 1956 | Richard Gallup | 24 | Ford | | | | | | | | | | | | | | | | | | | | | | | | | | | | | | RSP; 24 | PIF | CSF | CHI | CCF | MGY | OKL | ROA | OBS | SAN | NOR | PIF | MYB | POR | | | | | | | | | | | | | | 192nd | - | |
| 1957 | Richard Gallup | 640 | Ford | WSS | CON | TIC | DAB; 25 | CON | WIL | HBO | AWS | NWS | LAN | CLT | PIF | GBF | POR | CCF | RCH | MAR | POR | EUR | LIN | LCS | ASP | NWP | CLB | CPS | PIF | JAC | RSP | CLT | MAS | POR | HCY | NOR | LCS | GLN | KPC | LIN | OBS | MYB | DAR | NYF | AWS | CSF | SCF | LAN | CLB | CCF | CLT | MAR | NBR | CON | NWS | GBF | | | | NA | - | |
| 1958 | Ken Love | 145 | Ford | FAY | DAB; 34 | CON; 17 | FAY | WIL | HBO | FAY | CLB | PIF | ATL | CLT | MAR | ODS | OBS | GPS | GBF | STR | NWS | BGS | TRN | RSD | CLB | NBS | REF | LIN | HCY | AWS | RSP | MCC | SLS | TOR | BUF | MCF | BEL | BRR | CLB | | | | | | | | | | | | | | | | | | | | | 78th | - | |
| 1958 | Ken Love | 45 | Ford | | | | | | | | | | | | | | | | | | | | | | | | | | | | | | | | | | | | | NSV; 27 | AWS | BGS | MBS | DAR | CLT | BIR | CSF | GAF | RCH | HBO | SAS | MAR | NWS | ATL | | | | | | 78th | - | |
