= Bobby Myers (racing driver) =

American racing driver

- Myers in his race car 1957
- Born: June 27, 1927; Winston-Salem, North Carolina, U.S.
- Died: September 2, 1957 (aged 30); Darlington, South Carolina, U.S.
- Cause of death: Racing accident
- Achievements: Bowman Gray Stadium Modified Champion 1952; TV Trophy 1955

NASCAR Cup Series career
- 15 races run over 5 years
- Best finish: 80th (1950)
- First race: 1951 Race #17 (Weaverville)
- Last race: 1957 Southern 500 (Darlington)
Wins	Top tens	Poles
0	3	0

NASCAR Convertible Division career
- 2 races run over 1 year
- Best finish: 90th (1955)
- First race: 1955 Race #9 (Fayetteville)
- Last race: 1957 Rebel 300 (Darlington)
Wins	Top tens	Poles
0	6	0

Bobby Harris Myers (June 27, 1927 – September 2, 1957) was an American NASCAR driver. He ran 15 Grand National Series races from 1950 until his death in a crash during the 1957 Southern 500.

== Career ==
Bob Harris Myers was born on June 27, 1927, to his parents John R. Myers and Flonnie Wade Myers.

During his early career, Myers earned the nickname "Master of the Madhouse" for his hard driving style at the Bowman Gray Stadium, and began racing there in the late 1940s with his older brother Billy handled his mechanics until he decided he wanted to drive as well. The two won a total of four track championships at the Bowman Gray, with Myers winning the Modified championship in 1952 while Billy won in 1951, 1953 and 1955.

Myers began competing in the NASCAR Grand National Division in 1951 at the age of 24. He made two starts in 1951, in his first outing in the 200-lap event at the half-mile dirt Asheville–Weaverville Speedway in Weaverville, North Carolina, Myers finished 16th driving a 1949 Ford. Myers then drove the No. 2 Hudson in the Motor City 250 on the one-mile dirt track at the Michigan State Fairgrounds Speedway in Detroit, where he started 34th and finished 25th. Myers returned to NASCAR Grand National Division competition in 1952, driving George Hutchens's No. 6 Ford in the Southern 500 at Darlington. The Ford's engine came apart on lap 145 and relegated him to a 52nd finishing position in a field of 66 cars. Myers won the 1952 Bowman Gray Stadium Modified Championship.

In 1953, Myers drove the No. 18 Oldsmobile in two NASCAR Grand National events. In the Southern 500, he started 50th and worked his way to a 20th finishing position. At the one-mile circular Langhorne Speedway in Langhorne, Pennsylvania, Myers finished tenth. In 1955, Myers raced in England as part of the USA team that visited the country. He was a replacement for Fireball Roberts, who had other racing commitments. During this time, he won four races, one at Eastbourne and three at Harringay and secured the TV Trophy.

Myers did not compete in the Grand National Division again until 1956. He drove Ansel Rakestraw's No. 1 Chevrolet at the half-mile asphalt Palm Beach Speedway in West Palm Beach, Florida. He started the event in tenth and finished in tenth. At the Daytona Beach and Road Course, Myers started 63rd of 76 cars and finished 46th, failing to collect any of the purse money. At the half-mile dirt Wilson Speedway in Wilson, North Carolina, Myers started 24th and finished seventh. At Langhorne, Myers drove the No. 15W Ford owned by Bill Stroppe. Myers started the race in eighth position, but an engine failure dropped him to 38th. Myers started 12th in the No. 1 Chevrolet in the Virginia 500 at Martinsville but a right front hub failure left him in 15th position after completing 436 of the 500 laps. Myers was back behind the wheel of Bill Stroppe's No. 4 Mercury at Road America in what would be the only race in the series held at the Elkhart Lake, Wisconsin circuit until 2021. He started the race in 14th but a crash took him out on lap 39 and he finished 21st. The Stroppe Mercury carried the No. 76 for the Southern 500 and Myers put it in the 34th starting position. Problems with the gas tank on lap 91 put him out of the event and left him with a 61st finishing spot. Myers was optimistic for the Buddy Shuman 250 at the 4/10-mile dirt Hickory Speedway in Hickory, North Carolina after qualifying sixth, but a radiator problem on lap 105 put him out of the event and left him finishing in 19th position.

In 1957, Myers started sixth at the half-mile dirt Southern States Fairgrounds track in Charlotte, North Carolina driving Whitey Norman's No. 1A Ford, but a blown engine on lap 26 dropped him to a 19th finishing spot.

== Death ==
At the Southern 500 on September 2, 1957, Myers qualified the No. 4 Petty Enterprises Oldsmobile in the second spot. Myers led his first lap in NASCAR Grand National Division competition during the race. Myers was involved in a violent crash on lap 27; Fonty Flock was driving Herb Thomas's No. 92 Pontiac and spun on the backstretch (the current start-finish line), stopping perpendicular to the track, in turn three (near the current turn one following 1997 changes). Paul Goldsmith and Myers both struck the stopped car at full speed.

Flock and Goldsmith both received serious injuries in the crash. Fonty Flock spun and slid to a stop on the backstretch. Myers slammed into him, immediately followed by Paul Goldsmith. The crash seriously injured Goldsmith, ended Flock's career, and killed Myers. He then flipped side over side and barrel-rolled. Myers died from his injuries. He is buried in Oaklawn Memorial Gardens in Winston-Salem, Forsyth County, North Carolina.

== Legacy ==
Myers was survived by his wife Laura, along with his sons Richard and Danny "Chocolate" Myers. Both sons were involved in racing, with the later serving as the gasman on the famous "Flying Aces" pit crew of Richard Childress Racing and seven-time NASCAR Winston Cup Series Champion Dale Earnhardt. Myers' nephew Gary also raced in the Winston Cup Series and his great-nephews, Burt and Jason, were regular competitors on the Whelen Southern Modified Tour until the tour folded in 2016. In total, his family has taken over 100 victories at the Bowman Gray Stadium since it was opened in 1947.

In seven years of the NASCAR Grand National competition, Myers made 15 starts and recorded three top-ten finishes.

Myers and his brother Billy are immortalized by the National Motorsports Press Association Myers Brothers award during NASCAR's season-ending prizegiving banquet.
