= Billy Myers (racing driver) =

American stock car racing driver

- Born: October 19, 1924; Harrison County, West Virginia, U.S.
- Died: April 12, 1958 (aged 33); Winston-Salem, North Carolina, U.S.
- Achievements: 1951, 1953 and 1955 Bowman Gray Stadium Modified Champion; 1955 NASCAR Sportsman Division National Champion

NASCAR Cup Series career
- 84 races run over 6 years
- Best finish: 6th (1956)
- First race: 1951 Race #17 (Asheville-Weaverville Speedway)
- Last race: 1958 Race #2 (Concord)
- First win: 1956 Race #7 (Palm Beach Speedway)
- Last win: 1956 Race #40 (Norfolk Speedway)
Wins	Top tens	Poles
2	34	1

NASCAR Convertible Division career
- 14 races run over 2 years
- First race: 1957 Race #2 (Daytona Beach and Road Course)
- Last race: 1958 Race #4 Bowman Gray Stadium
- First win: 1957 Wilson Speedway
- Last win: 1958 North Wilkesboro Speedway
Wins	Top tens	Poles
2	10	0

William Wade "Billy" Myers (October 19, 1924 – April 12, 1958) was an American stock car racing driver who drove from 1949 to 1951. He competed in the NASCAR Grand National Series, from 1951 to 1958.

Myers was known for his success at Bowman Gray Stadium and won the NASCAR Sportsman Division Championship in 1955. Throughout his career he also competed in the NASCAR Modified Division and NASCAR Convertible Series.

== Early life ==
William Wade Myers was born on October 19, 1924, to his parents John R. Myers and Flonnie Wade Myers in Harrison County, West Virginia. His younger brother was fellow NASCAR driver Bobby Myers.

== Racing career ==
=== Bowman Gray Stadium ===
Myers first started getting involved in racing during the late 1940s, following in the footsteps of his younger brother Bobby, who had already made a name for himself at their local track Bowman Gray Stadium. Myers had served as his mechanic for his brother prior to starting his own racing career. During his early career, Myers earned the nickname "Mr. Bowman Gray" as he won the modified championship at the stadium three times in 1951, 1953 and 1955. In total, he won 22 Modified and Sportsman races at Bowman Gray Stadium.

=== NASCAR career ===
In 1950, Myers made nine starts in the NASCAR Modified Division where he won one race and secured five top-fives and four top-tens.

Myers made his debut in the NASCAR Grand National Division in 1951, finishing eighth at Asheville-Weaverville Speedway. He then drove at both Detroit and Darlington for Hubert Westmoreland claiming an 18th-place finish in the Southern 500. Myers started driving the R. G. Shelton's No. 22 Hudson, Martinsville Speedway, finishing third. He closed the year out with an 18th-place finish at North Wilkesboro and a 17th-place finish at Speedway Park. That year, he also raced nine times in the NASCAR Modified Division where he won one race and secured five top-fives and nine top-tens. That year, Myers also made ten starts in the Modified Division and won three races. In 1952 Meyers only made one appearance at the Motor City 250, racing Joe Hawkin's #98 Plymouth to a 14th-place finish.

Following a two-year hiatus, Myers returned to NASCAR's premier division for the 1955 season. He suffered a crash at Columbia, South Carolina which resulted in a 19th-place finish. Myers then drove Westmoreland's Chevrolet to a ninth-place finish at the Forsyth County Fairgrounds. He also finished 23rd in the Southern 500. However, Myers spent most of 1955 competing in the NASCAR Sportsman Division, where he won the National Championship, with 4810 points finishing 1000+ points ahead of second place Ralph Earnhardt.

During the 1956 season, Myers raced 42 out 56 events. On December 11, 1955, he picked a third-place finish at West Palm Beach, along with finishing runner up at the Daytona Beach course of February 26, 1956. During the second race of the season at West Palm Beach on March 4, Myers picked up his first NASCAR Grand National Division race victory. He finished runner up two more times at North Wilkesboro and Hickory. He won his only pole at Soldier's Field however he ended up finishing 17th after losing his brakes. Myers claimed another second-place finish at North Carolina and Road America at Elkhart Lakes, Wisconsin. He won his second race of the year at Norfolk Speedway on August 22. He closed out the year with another second-place finish at Coastal Speedway and Southern States Fairgrounds at Charlotte, North Carolina, and finished sixth overall in the standings with 13 top-fives and 22 top-tens.

During the 1957 season, Myers started in 28 of the NASCAR Grand National Division's 53 scheduled events. He claimed fpur top-fives and nine top-tens throughout the year. That year, he also started 11 races in the NASCAR Convertible Series winning the race at Wilson Speedway. His final two races in NASCARs Grand National Division came at Daytona and Concord in 1958. A month before his death, he rejoined the NASCAR Convertible Series, where he started three races and won the race at North Wilkesboro Speedway.

=== Death ===
On April 12, 1958, while racing in a Modified event at Bowman Gray Stadium, Myers slammed into the fence after suffering a heart attack and died. His brother Bobby had also died on the race track at the Southern 500 on September 2, 1957.

Every year, NASCAR bestows the prestigious Myers Brothers Award in honor of Myers and his brother Bobby, to the person, corporation, or entity that has had the greatest positive impact on the sport of stock car racing that year.

== Personal life ==
Myers was married to his wife Arlene, together they had a son named Gary, who raced in the NASCAR Cup Series. Myers grandchildren Burt and Jason, were also regular competitors on the Whelen Southern Modified Tour until the tour folded in 2016. Burt's son Slate Myers is a regular at Bowman Gray. His nephew Danny "Chocolate" Myers, later became involved in NASCAR, serving as the gasman on the famous "Flying Aces" pit crew of Richard Childress Racing and seven-time NASCAR Winston Cup Series Champion Dale Earnhardt.
