= 1956 Buddy Shuman 250 =

Auto race held at Hickory Speedway in 1956

Race details
- Race 55 of 56 in the 1956 NASCAR Grand National Series season
- Date: November 11, 1956; 69 years ago
- Official name: Buddy Shuman 250
- Location: Hickory Speedway; Hickory, North Carolina, U.S.
- Course: Permanent racing facility
- Course length: 0.400 miles (0.644 km)
- Distance: 250 laps, 100 mi (150 km)
- Weather: Chilly with temperatures of 64.9 °F (18.3 °C); wind speeds of 13 miles per hour (21 km/h)
- Average speed: 66.420 miles per hour (106.893 km/h)
- Attendance: 3,500

Pole position
Driver	Ralph Earnhardt	Pete DePaolo

Most laps led
Driver	Speedy Thompson	Carl Kiekhaefer
- Laps: 154

Winner
No. 300	Speedy Thompson	Carl Kiekhaefer

Television in the United States
- Network: untelevised
- Announcers: none

The 1956 Buddy Shuman 250 was a NASCAR Grand National Series event that was held on November 11, 1956, at Hickory Speedway in Hickory, North Carolina.

== Background ==
Hickory Motor Speedway is a short track located in Hickory, North Carolina. It is one of stock car racing's most storied venues, and is often referred to as the "World's Most Famous Short Track" and the "Birthplace of the NASCAR Stars".

The track first opened in 1951 as a 1/2-mile (0.80 km) dirt track. Gwyn Staley won the first race at the speedway and later became the first track champion. Drivers such as Junior Johnson, Ned Jarrett, and Ralph Earnhardt also became track champions in the 1950s, with Earnhardt winning five of them.

In 1953, NASCAR's Grand National Series visited the track for the first time. Tim Flock won the first race at the speedway, which became a regular part of the Grand National schedule. After winning his track championship in 1952, Junior Johnson became the most successful Grand National driver at Hickory, winning there seven times.

The track has been re-configured three times in its history. The track became a 0.4-mile (644 meters) dirt track in 1955, which was paved for the first time during the 1967 season.

== Race report ==
Ralph Earnhardt would make his NASCAR Cup Series debut here; being the first member of the Earnhardt family to enter the organization. 250 laps took place on a dirt track that spanned 0.400 miles or 0.644 kilometres per lap; for a grand total of 100.0 miles or 160.9 kilometres. The race took one hour and thirty minutes to successfully conclude with Speedy Thompson defeating Earnhardt by four seconds in front of 3500 live spectators. The average speed of the race would be 66.420 miles per hour or 106.893 kilometres per hour while the pole position winner would dial in at a speed of 68.278 miles per hour or 109.883 kilometres per hour. All 22 racers on the starting grid were American-born males.

Other notable racers of the era like Tiny Lund, Lee Petty, and Buck Baker would make an appearance during this race. Billy Carden would be credited for making the race's last-place finish with a clutch problem on lap 9. DePaolo Engineering would sponsor four of the drivers in the race (Earnhardt, Ralph Moody, Bill Amick, and Carden). This would be the last NASCAR race for Junior Johnson before he went to jail for 11 months for his illegal moonshine activities.

The combined prize purse for this race was $4,285; with the winner (Speedy Thompson) taking home $850 ($9,831 when adjusted for inflation) while Pete Yow would be the 20th-place finisher bringing home a meager $50 ($578 when adjusted for inflation). Blackie Pitt and Billy Carden both failed to make a paycheck during this race; causing them to lose money for their hard efforts.

Carl Kiekhaefer was the only notable crew chief on attendance for this race.

=== Qualifying ===
Grid	No.	Driver	Manufacturer	Owner
1	22	Ralph Earnhardt	'56 Ford	Pete DePaolo
2	300B	Buck Baker	'56 Chrysler	Carl Kiekhaefer
3	86	Doug Cox	'56 Ford	John Foster
4	2	Junior Johnson	'56 Ford	Pete DePaolo
5	83	Johnny Dodson	'56 Chevrolet	Johnny Dodson
6	4	Bobby Myers	'56 Mercury	Bill Stroppe
7	500	Jack Smith	'56 Dodge	Carl Kiekhaefer
8	97	Billy Amick	'56 Ford	Pete DePaolo
9	300	Speedy Thompson	'56 Chrysler	Carl Kiekhaefer
10	42	Lee Petty	'56 Dodge	Petty Enterprises
11	16	Tiny Lund	'56 Chevrolet	Gus Holzmueller
12	12	Ralph Moody	'55 Ford	Pete DePaolo
13	297	Billy Carden	'56 Ford	Pete DePaolo
14	64	Johnny Allen	'56 Ford	Spook Crawford
15	75	Bill Blair	'56 Mercury	Frank Hayworth
16	60	Brownie King	'56 Chevrolet	Brownie King
17	31	Bill Champion	'56 Ford	John Whitford
18	209	Pete Stewart	'56 Plymouth	Pete Stewart
19	203	Pete Yow	'56 Ford	Pete Yow
20	59	Blackie Pitt	'56 Plymouth	Brownie Pitt
21	96	Bobby Keck	'56 Chevrolet	Bobby Keck
22	418	George Green	'56 Chevrolet	George Green

== Finishing order ==
Section reference:

1. Speedy Thompson† (No. 300)
2. Ralph Earnhardt† (No. 22)
3. Buck Baker† (No. 300B)
4. Ralph Moody† (No. 12)
5. Doug Cox (No. 86)
6. Bill Amick† (No. 97)
7. Tiny Lund† (No.16)
8. Johnny Dodson (No. 83)
9. Bill Champion† (No. 31)
10. Bill Blair† (No. 75)
11. Lee Petty*† (No.42)
12. Pete Stewart (No. 209)
13. George Green (No. 418)
14. Johnny Allen (No. 64)
15. Junior Johnson* (No. 2)
16. Brownie King (No. 60)
17. Bobby Keck*† (No. 96)
18. Jack Smith*† (No. 500)
19. Bobby Myers*† (No. 4)
20. Pete Yow* (No. 203)
21. Blackie Pitt*† (No. 59)
22. Billy Carden*† (No. 297)

† signifies that the driver is known to be deceased
* Driver failed to finish race

== Lap leader breakdown ==
Lap leader breakdown
Driver	From lap	To lap	# of laps
Speedy Thompson	1	38	38
Junor Johnson	39	81	43
Ralph Earnhardt	82	96	15
Speedy Thompson	97	250	154

== Timeline ==
Section reference:

- Start of race: Buck Baker starts off the race in the pole position.
- Lap 9: Billy Carden's faulty vehicle clutch would render him the last-place finisher for this event.
- Lap 39: Junior Johnson takes over the lead from Buck Baker.
- Lap 63: Blackie Pett developed engine problems with his vehicle.
- Lap 82: Ralph Earnhardt takes over the lead from Junior Johnson.
- Lap 89: Pete Yow suddenly had a faulty transmission in his racing vehicle.
- Lap 97: Speedy Thompson takes over the lead from Ralph Earnhardt.
- Lap 105: Bobby Myers' radiator went haywire, forcing him out of the race.
- Lap 126: Jack Smith's vehicle developed the same problem as Bobby Myers back on lap 105.
- Lap 179: Bobby Keck had to leave the race due to a problem with his vehicle's bearings.
- Lap 210: Junior Johnson's vapor lock developed issues, forcing him to exit the event.
- Lap 232: The right rear axle of Lee Petty's vehicle became problematic, causing him to leave the race.
- Finish: Speedy Thompson was officially declared the winner of the event.

Preceded by 1956 Old Dominion 400	NASCAR Grand National Series Season; 1956	Succeeded by 1956 untitled race at Wilson Speedway
