= Bill Bowman (racing driver) =

American racecar driver (1935–2008)

- Born: Aberdeen, Maryland, United States

NASCAR Cup Series career
- 8 races run over 3 years
- Best finish: 57th – 1957 NASCAR Grand National Series season
- First race: 1955 race at Lincoln Speedway
- Last race: 1957 race at Norfolk Speedway
Wins	Top tens	Poles
0	6	0

Bill Bowman (August 29, 1935 – July 7, 2008) was a NASCAR Grand National Series driver from Aberdeen, Maryland. He raced in the 1956 and 1957 Grand National races.

== Career ==
Bowman managed to get four "top ten finishes" after racing for 1,673 laps and earning $1,220 ($13,985.19 when adjusted for inflation). His average start is 24th and his average finish is 15th place.

Dirt tracks were his favorite racing venue as Bowman managed to finish an average of 11th place. Intermediate tracks gave him difficulty, as he finished an average of 35th place there. Darlington Raceway gave Bowman the most grief with an average finish of 35th place while he found pleasure in Forsyth County Fairgrounds and Langhorne Speedway giving him average finishes of eighth place.

Bowman's final race was the 1967 International Championship of Makes.

Mostly associated with the No. 71 Chevrolet, Bowman was an independent driver for most of his career.
