= Tom Lupo =

American actor and stuntman

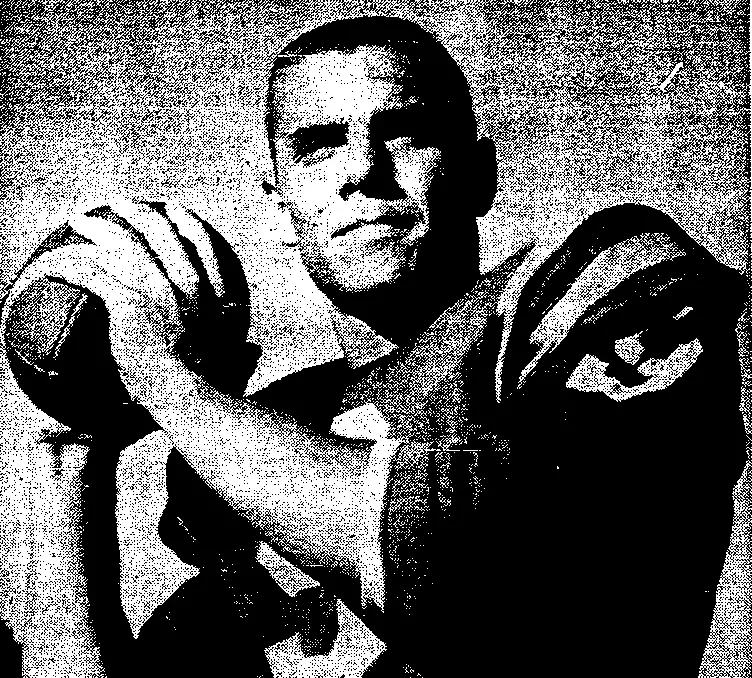
- Lupo in 1960
- Born: Thomas Lee Lupo; August 30, 1943 (age 82); Baltimore, Maryland, U.S.
- Occupations: Actor, stuntman
- Spouse: Sherry Lodi (m. 1965)
- Children: 3

Thomas Lee Lupo (born August 30, 1943) is an American actor and stuntman. He is best known for serving as a stunt double for Tom Selleck in the American crime drama television series Magnum, P.I. from 1982 to 1988.

== Life and career ==
Lupo was born in Baltimore, Maryland, the son of Louis Lupo, a musician. He played American football at Birmingham High School, and graduated in 1961. After graduating, from 1962 to 1964, he played as a quarterback and defensive end for the Trojans at the University of Southern California. He began his screen career in 1966, appearing in the NBC science fiction television series Star Trek: The Original Series. In 1976, he performed a stunt in the film Bound for Glory.

Later in his career, from 1978 to 1979, Lupo served as a stunt double for Robert Urich in the first season of the ABC crime drama television series Vega$. He then served as a stunt double for Tom Selleck in the CBS crime drama television series Magnum, P.I. from 1982 to 1988. Aside from stunt doubling Urich and Selleck, he also stunt doubled for actors Erik Estrada, David Janssen, Robert Shaw, Paul Newman, Nick Nolte and Kris Kristofferson. He performed stunts in the television programs The Streets of San Francisco, Fantasy Island, Buck Rogers in the 25th Century and Charlie’s Angels.

== Personal life ==
On June 26, 1965, Lupo married Sherry Lodi. He had three children, all of whom were stunt performers.
