= Gordon Haines =

American racing driver (1921–2012)

- Born: May 6, 1921; Kiester, Minnesota, U.S.
- Died: October 3, 2012 (aged 91); Yakima, Washington, U.S.

NASCAR Cup Series career
- 7 races run over 1 year
- Best finish: 44th (1956)
- First race: 1956 Race 21 (Portland)
- Last race: 1956 Race 43 (Portland)
Wins	Top tens	Poles
0	4	0

Gordon Earnest Haines (May 6, 1921 – October 3, 2012) was an American stock car racing driver. He competed in the NASCAR Grand National Series during 1956.

== Career ==
In addition to his Grand National Series career, Haines also raced in the Pacific Coast Late Model Division. He competed in seven Grand National events in his career, earning four top-tens. All of those races came in 1956, when Haines finished 44th in points. Haines was good right out of the gate, finishing three laps down in ninth place at Portland Speedway. Haines then drove to a career-best second-place effort at Eureka. Mechanical failures left Haines out of the next two races, but then he finished fourth at Sacramento and ninth at San Mateo in his final three races to close out his career, finishing 15th in his final race, at Portland.

Haines worked at Bi-Rite Motors in Yakima, Washington for many years.

== Personal life ==
Haines was born in Kiester, Minnesota and served in the United States Marine Corps. He died in Yakima, Washington, where he had made his long-time home, on October 3, 2012.
