= 1987 Miller High Life 400 =

Third race of the 1987 NASCAR Winston Cup Series

Race details
- Race 3 of 29 in the 1987 NASCAR Winston Cup Series
- The 1987 Miller High Life 400 program cover, featuring Kyle Petty.
- Date: March 8, 1987
- Official name: 33rd Annual Miller High Life 400
- Location: Richmond, Virginia, Richmond Fairgrounds Raceway
- Course: Permanent racing facility
- Course length: 0.542 miles (0.872 km)
- Distance: 400 laps, 216.8 mi (348.905 km)
- Scheduled distance: 400 laps, 216.8 mi (348.905 km)
- Average speed: 81.52 miles per hour (131.19 km/h)
- Attendance: 30,000

Pole position
Driver	Alan Kulwicki	AK Racing
- Time: 20.506

Most laps led
Driver	Dale Earnhardt	Richard Childress Racing
- Laps: 235

Winner
No. 3	Dale Earnhardt	Richard Childress Racing

Television in the United States
- Network: TBS
- Announcers: Ken Squier, Lake Speed

Radio in the United States
- Radio: Motor Racing Network

The 1987 Miller High Life 400 was the third stock car race of the 1987 NASCAR Winston Cup Series season and the 33rd iteration of the event. Originally scheduled to be the second race of the season, the race was postponed from its scheduled date of February 22, 1987 to March 8 due to winter storms that affected the Richmond area and scheduling conflicts. The race was held before an audience of 30,000 in Richmond, Virginia, at Richmond Fairgrounds Raceway, a 0.542 miles (0.872 km) D-shaped oval. The race took the scheduled 400 laps to complete.

After recovering from a practice crash early in the race's weekend and an early spin during the ninth lap of the race itself, Richard Childress Racing's Dale Earnhardt was able to mount a comeback, dominating a majority of the race to take his 22nd career NASCAR Winston Cup Series victory and his second victory of the season. To fill out the top three, Hendrick Motorsports' Geoff Bodine and Blue Max Racing's Rusty Wallace finished second and third, respectively.

== Background ==
Richmond International Raceway (RIR) is a 3/4-mile (1.2 km), D-shaped, asphalt race track located just outside Richmond, Virginia in Henrico County. It hosts the Monster Energy NASCAR Cup Series and Xfinity Series. Known as "America's premier short track", it formerly hosted a NASCAR Camping World Truck Series race, an IndyCar Series race, and two USAC sprint car races.

=== Entry list ===
- (R) denotes rookie driver.

#	Driver	Team	Make	Sponsor
02	Bill Hollar	Hollar Racing Enterprises	Pontiac	Hollar Racing Enterprises
3	Dale Earnhardt	Richard Childress Racing	Chevrolet	Wrangler
04	Clark James	James Racing	Pontiac	James Racing
5	Geoff Bodine	Hendrick Motorsports	Chevrolet	Levi Garrett
6	D. K. Ulrich	U.S. Racing	Chevrolet	U.S. Racing
7	Alan Kulwicki	AK Racing	Ford	Zerex
8	Bobby Hillin Jr.	Stavola Brothers Racing	Buick	Miller American
9	Bill Elliott	Melling Racing	Ford	Coors
11	Terry Labonte	Junior Johnson & Associates	Chevrolet	Budweiser
12	Slick Johnson	Hamby Racing	Chevrolet	Hamby Racing
15	Ricky Rudd	Bud Moore Engineering	Ford	Motorcraft Quality Parts
17	Darrell Waltrip	Hendrick Motorsports	Chevrolet	Tide
18	Tommy Ellis	Freedlander Motorsports	Chevrolet	Freedlander Financial
21	Kyle Petty	Wood Brothers Racing	Ford	Citgo
22	Bobby Allison	Stavola Brothers Racing	Buick	Miller American
26	Morgan Shepherd	King Racing	Buick	Quaker State
27	Rusty Wallace	Blue Max Racing	Pontiac	Kodiak
28	Davey Allison (R)	Ranier-Lundy Racing	Ford	Ranier-Lundy Racing
30	Michael Waltrip	Bahari Racing	Chevrolet	Domino's
33	Harry Gant	Mach 1 Racing	Chevrolet	Skoal Bandit
34	Ron Shephard	AAG Racing	Oldsmobile	AAG Racing
35	Benny Parsons	Hendrick Motorsports	Chevrolet	Folgers
43	Richard Petty	Petty Enterprises	Pontiac	STP
44	Sterling Marlin	Hagan Racing	Oldsmobile	Piedmont Airlines
48	Tony Spanos	Hylton Motorsports	Chevrolet	Hylton Motorsports
52	Jimmy Means	Jimmy Means Racing	Pontiac	Turtle Wax
55	Phil Parsons	Jackson Bros. Motorsports	Oldsmobile	Copenhagen
62	Steve Christman (R)	Winkle Motorsports	Pontiac	AC Spark Plug
64	Jerry Cranmer	Langley Racing	Ford	Sunny King Ford
67	Eddie Bierschwale	Arrington Racing	Ford	Pannill Sweatshirts
70	J. D. McDuffie	McDuffie Racing	Pontiac	AC Spark Plug
71	Dave Marcis	Marcis Auto Racing	Chevrolet	Lifebuoy
72	Eddie Drury	Drury Racing	Chevrolet	Drury Racing
74	Bobby Wawak	Wawak Racing	Chevrolet	Wawak Racing
75	Neil Bonnett	RahMoc Enterprises	Pontiac	Valvoline
81	Buddy Arrington	Fillip Racing	Ford	Pannill Sweatshirts
90	Ken Schrader	Donlavey Racing	Ford	Red Baron Frozen Pizza

== Qualifying ==
Qualifying was split into two rounds. The first round was held on Friday, March 6, at 3:00 PM EST. Each driver had one lap to set a time. During the first round, the top 20 drivers in the round were guaranteed a starting spot in the race. If a driver was not able to guarantee a spot in the first round, they had the option to scrub their time from the first round and try and run a faster lap time in a second round qualifying run, held on Saturday, March 7, at 10:45 AM EST. As with the first round, each driver had one lap to set a time. For this specific race, positions 21-30 were decided on time, and depending on who needed it, a select amount of positions were given to cars who had not otherwise qualified but were high enough in owner's points in the previous season; up to two were given.

Alan Kulwicki, driving for his own AK Racing team, managed to win the pole, setting a time of 20.506 and an average speed of 95.153 miles per hour (153.134 km/h) in the first round.

Five drivers failed to qualify.

=== Full qualifying results ===
Pos.	#	Driver	Team	Make	Time	Speed
1	7	Alan Kulwicki	AK Racing	Ford	20.506	95.153
2	33	Harry Gant	Mach 1 Racing	Chevrolet	20.596	94.737
3	3	Dale Earnhardt	Richard Childress Racing	Chevrolet	20.614	94.654
4	5	Geoff Bodine	Hendrick Motorsports	Chevrolet	20.670	94.398
5	44	Sterling Marlin	Hagan Racing	Oldsmobile	20.678	94.361
6	17	Darrell Waltrip	Hendrick Motorsports	Chevrolet	20.692	94.297
7	35	Benny Parsons	Hendrick Motorsports	Chevrolet	20.693	94.293
8	15	Ricky Rudd	Bud Moore Engineering	Ford	20.699	94.265
9	11	Terry Labonte	Junior Johnson & Associates	Chevrolet	20.710	94.215
10	26	Morgan Shepherd	King Racing	Buick	20.710	94.215
11	9	Bill Elliott	Melling Racing	Ford	20.713	94.202
12	27	Rusty Wallace	Blue Max Racing	Pontiac	20.760	93.988
13	22	Bobby Allison	Stavola Brothers Racing	Buick	20.829	93.677
14	30	Michael Waltrip	Bahari Racing	Chevrolet	20.870	93.493
15	43	Richard Petty	Petty Enterprises	Pontiac	20.927	93.238
16	90	Ken Schrader	Donlavey Racing	Ford	20.954	93.118
17	18	Tommy Ellis	Freedlander Motorsports	Chevrolet	20.960	93.092
18	21	Kyle Petty	Wood Brothers Racing	Ford	20.976	93.021
19	71	Dave Marcis	Marcis Auto Racing	Chevrolet	21.118	92.395
20	62	Steve Christman (R)	Winkle Motorsports	Pontiac	21.171	92.164
Failed to lock in Round 1
21	28	Davey Allison (R)	Ranier-Lundy Racing	Ford	21.093	92.505
22	55	Phil Parsons	Jackson Bros. Motorsports	Oldsmobile	21.172	92.159
23	52	Jimmy Means	Jimmy Means Racing	Pontiac	21.229	91.912
24	75	Neil Bonnett	RahMoc Enterprises	Pontiac	21.270	91.735
25	67	Eddie Bierschwale	Arrington Racing	Ford	21.274	91.718
26	81	Buddy Arrington	Fillip Racing	Ford	21.305	91.584
27	8	Bobby Hillin Jr.	Stavola Brothers Racing	Buick	21.367	91.318
28	64	Jerry Cranmer	Langley Racing	Ford	21.566	90.476
29	12	Slick Johnson	Hamby Racing	Oldsmobile	21.590	90.375
30	74	Bobby Wawak	Wawak Racing	Chevrolet	21.762	89.661
Provisionals
31	70	J. D. McDuffie	McDuffie Racing	Pontiac	21.852	89.292
32	6	D. K. Ulrich	U.S. Racing	Chevrolet	21.921	89.011
Failed to qualify
33	04	Clark James	James Racing	Pontiac	-*	-*
34	48	Tony Spanos	Hylton Motorsports	Chevrolet	-*	-*
35	72	Eddie Drury	Drury Racing	Chevrolet	-*	-*
36	34	Ron Shephard	AAG Racing	Oldsmobile	-*	-*
37	02	Bill Hollar	Hollar Racing Enterprises	Pontiac	-*	-*
Official first round qualifying results
Official starting lineup

== Race results ==
Fin	St	#	Driver	Team	Make	Laps	Led	Status	Pts	Winnings
1	3	3	Dale Earnhardt	Richard Childress Racing	Chevrolet	400	235	running	185	$49,150
2	4	5	Geoff Bodine	Hendrick Motorsports	Chevrolet	400	0	running	170	$24,010
3	12	27	Rusty Wallace	Blue Max Racing	Pontiac	400	0	running	165	$18,225
4	11	9	Bill Elliott	Melling Racing	Ford	400	9	running	165	$14,285
5	9	11	Terry Labonte	Junior Johnson & Associates	Chevrolet	400	1	running	160	$13,590
6	1	7	Alan Kulwicki	AK Racing	Ford	400	65	running	155	$15,370
7	18	21	Kyle Petty	Wood Brothers Racing	Ford	399	0	running	146	$6,870
8	19	71	Dave Marcis	Marcis Auto Racing	Chevrolet	399	0	running	142	$6,360
9	13	22	Bobby Allison	Stavola Brothers Racing	Buick	399	16	running	143	$8,470
10	7	35	Benny Parsons	Hendrick Motorsports	Chevrolet	398	0	running	134	$11,700
11	27	8	Bobby Hillin Jr.	Stavola Brothers Racing	Buick	396	0	running	130	$7,845
12	14	30	Michael Waltrip	Bahari Racing	Chevrolet	396	0	running	127	$5,945
13	16	90	Ken Schrader	Donlavey Racing	Ford	395	0	crash	124	$5,035
14	23	52	Jimmy Means	Jimmy Means Racing	Pontiac	394	0	running	121	$4,845
15	22	55	Phil Parsons	Jackson Bros. Motorsports	Oldsmobile	391	0	running	118	$2,145
16	31	70	J. D. McDuffie	McDuffie Racing	Pontiac	389	0	running	115	$1,700
17	26	81	Buddy Arrington	Fillip Racing	Ford	387	0	running	112	$1,625
18	25	67	Eddie Bierschwale	Arrington Racing	Ford	381	0	running	109	$4,410
19	29	12	Slick Johnson	Hamby Racing	Oldsmobile	379	0	running	106	$4,260
20	6	17	Darrell Waltrip	Hendrick Motorsports	Chevrolet	351	23	rear end	108	$1,885
21	5	44	Sterling Marlin	Hagan Racing	Oldsmobile	351	1	running	105	$4,060
22	24	75	Neil Bonnett	RahMoc Enterprises	Pontiac	321	0	crash	97	$3,805
23	15	43	Richard Petty	Petty Enterprises	Pontiac	317	0	running	94	$3,480
24	28	64	Jerry Cranmer	Langley Racing	Ford	312	0	crash	91	$3,435
25	2	33	Harry Gant	Mach 1 Racing	Chevrolet	265	50	transmission	93	$3,615
26	21	28	Davey Allison (R)	Ranier-Lundy Racing	Ford	206	0	crash	0	$1,685
27	17	18	Tommy Ellis	Freedlander Motorsports	Chevrolet	161	0	crash	82	$3,310
28	8	15	Ricky Rudd	Bud Moore Engineering	Ford	143	0	crash	79	$8,215
29	20	62	Steve Christman (R)	Winkle Motorsports	Pontiac	116	0	rear end	76	$1,080
30	32	6	D. K. Ulrich	U.S. Racing	Chevrolet	105	0	oil leak	73	$2,545
31	10	26	Morgan Shepherd	King Racing	Buick	79	0	crash	70	$2,545
32	30	74	Bobby Wawak	Wawak Racing	Chevrolet	62	0	overheating	67	$1,045
Failed to qualify
33		04	Clark James	James Racing	Pontiac					
34		48	Tony Spanos	Hylton Motorsports	Chevrolet					
35		72	Eddie Drury	Drury Racing	Chevrolet					
36		34	Ron Shephard	AAG Racing	Oldsmobile					
37		02	Bill Hollar	Hollar Racing Enterprises	Pontiac					
Official race results

== Standings after the race ==
Drivers' Championship standings

	Pos	Driver	Points
	1	Dale Earnhardt	530
	2	Bill Elliott	510 (-20)
6	3	Bobby Allison	417 (-113)
2	4	Ken Schrader	414 (–116)
6	5	Terry Labonte	411 (–119)
1	6	Darrell Waltrip	401 (–129)
3	7	Neil Bonnett	399 (–131)
5	8	Ricky Rudd	392 (–138)
2	9	Richard Petty	382 (–148)
	10	Phil Parsons	378 (–152)
Official driver's standings

- Note: Only the first 10 positions are included for the driver standings.

Previous race: 1987 Goodwrench 500	NASCAR Winston Cup Series; 1987 season	Next race: 1987 Motorcraft Quality Parts 500
