= 1981 NASCAR Winston Cup Series =

American motorsport season

Seasons
- ← 1980 1982 →

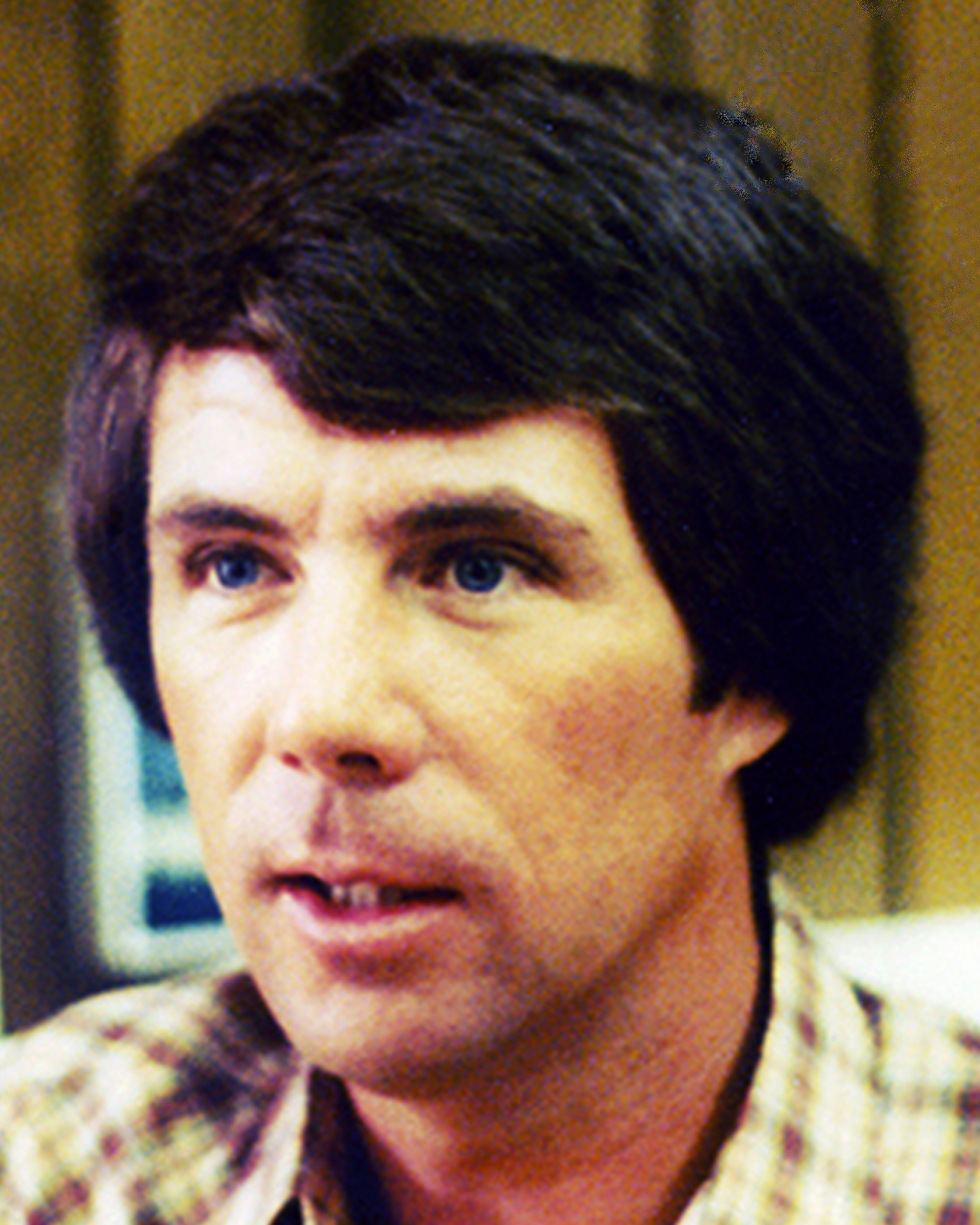
Darrell Waltrip, the Winston Cup Series champion in 1981

The 1981 NASCAR Winston Cup Series was the thirty-third season of professional stock car racing in the United States and the 10th modern-era Cup Season. It was the first year of the Gen 3 car. Because of the energy crisis, manufacturers were downsizing their cars to be more fuel-efficient, which NASCAR reflected by mandating a 110-inch wheelbase that still exists today. The season began at Riverside International Raceway with the first Winston Western 500 on January 11, 1981 and ended with the same event on November 22. Darrell Waltrip won his first championship with point margin of fifty-three points over Bobby Allison. Ron Bouchard was named Rookie of the Year.

== Teams and drivers ==
Team	Make	No.	Driver	Car Owner	Crew Chief
Arrington Racing	Dodge Mirada	67	Buddy Arrington	Buddy Arrington	
Benfield Racing	Pontiac Grand Prix; Buick Regal	98	Johnny Rutherford (R)	Ron Benfield	Buddy Parrott
Bud Moore Engineering	Ford Thunderbird	15	Benny Parsons	Bud Moore	Bud Moore
Cliff Stewart Racing	Pontiac Grand Prix	5	Joe Millikan	Cliff Stewart	Darrell Bryant
DiGard Motorsports	Chevrolet Monte Carlo	88	Ricky Rudd	Bill Gardner	Gary Nelson
Donlavey Racing	Ford Thunderbird	90	Jody Ridley	Junie Donlavey	
Ellington Racing	Oldsmobile Cutlass; Buick Regal	1	Buddy Baker	Hoss Ellington	Runt Pittman
Gordon Racing	Buick Regal	24	Cecil Gordon	Cecil Gordon	
Gordon Racing	Buick Regal	24	Morgan Shepherd (R)	Cecil Gordon	
Hagan Racing	Buick Regal	44	Terry Labonte	Billy Hagan	Jake Elder
Howard & Egerton Racing	Buick Regal	86	Elliott Forbes-Robinson (R)	Richard Howard	
Hylton Racing	Pontiac Grand Prix	48	James Hylton	James Hylton	
Osterlund Racing 16	Pontiac Grand Prix	2	Dale Earnhardt 20	Rod Osterlund	Doug Richert
Jim Stacy Racing 15	Buick Regal	2	Dale Earnhardt 20	Jim Stacy	Doug Richert
Jim Stacy Racing 15	Buick Regal	2	Joe Ruttman (R) 11	Jim Stacy	Dale Inman
Junior Johnson & Associates	Buick Regal	11	Darrell Waltrip	Junior Johnson	Tim Brewer
Junior Johnson & Associates	Buick Regal	41	Richard Childress 1	Junior Johnson	
Langley Racing	Ford Thunderbird	64	Tommy Gale	Elmo Langley	
Lennie Pond Racing	Buick Regal	68	Lennie Pond	Lennie Pond	
M. C. Anderson Racing	Buick Regal	27	Cale Yarborough	M. C. Anderson	David Anderson
Mach 1 Racing	Pontiac Grand Prix	22	Stan Barrett (R)	Hal Needham	
Mach 1 Racing	Pontiac Grand Prix	33	Harry Gant	Hal Needham	Travis Carter
Marcis Auto Racing	Buick Regal	71	Dave Marcis	Dave Marcis	Claude Queen
McDuffie Racing	Pontiac Grand Prix	70	J. D. McDuffie	J. D. McDuffie	
Means Racing	Pontiac Grand Prix	52	Jimmy Means	Jimmy Means	
Elliott Racing	Ford Thunderbird	9	Bill Elliott 13	George Elliott	Ernie Elliott
Petty Enterprises	Buick Regal	42	Richard Petty 1	Richard Petty	Mike Beam
Petty Enterprises	Buick Regal	42	Kyle Petty 30	Richard Petty	Mike Beam
Petty Enterprises	Buick Regal	43	Kyle Petty 1	Richard Petty	Steve Hmiel
Petty Enterprises	Buick Regal	43	Richard Petty 30	Richard Petty	Steve Hmiel
Race Hill Farm Team	Buick Regal	47	Ron Bouchard	Jack Beebe	Bob Johnson
RahMoc Enterprises	Buick Regal	75	Gary Balough (R)	Bob Rahilly	Bob Rahilly
Ranier-Lundy Racing	Pontiac LeMans; Buick Regal	28	Bobby Allison	Harry Ranier	Waddell Wilson
Richard Childress Racing	Pontiac Grand Prix	3	Richard Childress 20	Richard Childress	Kirk Shelmerdine
Richard Childress Racing	Pontiac Grand Prix	3	Dale Earnhardt 11	Richard Childress	Kirk Shelmerdine
Richard Childress Racing	Pontiac Grand Prix	8	Kirk Shelmerdine 1	Richard Childress	
Rogers Racing	Buick Regal	37	Mike Alexander (R)	Bob Rogers	Raymond Kelly
Rogers Racing	Buick Regal	37	Tim Richmond (R)	Bob Rogers	Raymond Kelly
Speed Racing	Oldsmobile Cutlass	66	Lake Speed	Lake Speed	
Thomas Racing	Pontiac Grand Prix	25	Ronnie Thomas	Ronnie Thomas	
Ulrich Racing	Buick Regal	99	D. K. Ulrich	D. K. Ulrich	
Wawak Racing	Buick Regal	94	Bobby Wawak	Bobby Wawak	
Wood Brothers Racing	Ford Thunderbird	21	Neil Bonnett	Glen Wood	Leonard Wood

== Season schedule and recap ==
Round	Date	Event	Track	Winner
1	January 11	Winston Western 500	Riverside International Raceway	Bobby Allison
	February 8	Busch Clash	Daytona International Speedway	Darrell Waltrip
	February 12	UNO Twin 125 Qualifier	Daytona International Speedway	Bobby Allison
	February 12	UNO Twin 125 Qualifier	Daytona International Speedway	Darrell Waltrip
	February 13	Daytona 500 Consolation Race	Daytona International Speedway	Lake Speed
2	February 15	Daytona 500	Daytona International Speedway	Richard Petty
3	February 22	Richmond 400	Richmond Fairgrounds Raceway	Darrell Waltrip
4	March 1	Carolina 500	North Carolina Motor Speedway	Darrell Waltrip
5	March 15	Coca-Cola 500	Atlanta International Raceway	Cale Yarborough
6	March 29	Valleydale 500	Bristol International Raceway	Darrell Waltrip
7	April 5	Northwestern Bank 400	North Wilkesboro Speedway	Richard Petty
8	April 12	CRC Rebel 500	Darlington International Raceway	Darrell Waltrip
9	April 26	Virginia 500	Martinsville Speedway	Morgan Shepherd
10	May 3	Winston 500	Alabama International Motor Speedway	Bobby Allison
11	May 9	Melling Tool 420	Nashville Speedway	Benny Parsons
12	May 17	Mason-Dixon 500	Dover Downs International Speedway	Jody Ridley
13	May 24	World 600	Charlotte Motor Speedway	Bobby Allison
14	June 7	Budweiser 400	Texas World Speedway	Benny Parsons
15	June 14	Hodgdon 400	Riverside International Raceway	Darrell Waltrip
16	June 21	Gabriel 400	Michigan International Speedway	Bobby Allison
17	July 4	Firecracker 400	Daytona International Speedway	Cale Yarborough
18	July 11	Busch Nashville 420	Nashville Speedway	Darrell Waltrip
19	July 26	Mt. Dew 500	Pocono Raceway	Darrell Waltrip
20	August 2	Talladega 500	Alabama International Motor Speedway	Ron Bouchard
21	August 16	Champion Spark Plug 400	Michigan International Speedway	Richard Petty
22	August 22	Busch 500	Bristol International Raceway	Darrell Waltrip
23	September 7	Southern 500	Darlington International Raceway	Neil Bonnett
24	September 13	Wrangler SanforSet 400	Richmond Fairgrounds Raceway	Benny Parsons
25	September 20	CRC Chemicals 500	Dover Downs International Speedway	Neil Bonnett
26	September 27	Old Dominion 500	Martinsville Speedway	Darrell Waltrip
27	October 4	Holly Farms 400	North Wilkesboro Speedway	Darrell Waltrip
28	October 11	National 500	Charlotte Motor Speedway	Darrell Waltrip
29	November 1	American 500	North Carolina Motor Speedway	Darrell Waltrip
30	November 8	Atlanta Journal 500	Atlanta International Raceway	Neil Bonnett
31	November 22	Winston Western 500	Riverside International Raceway	Bobby Allison

== Season summary ==
=== Race reports ===
- Western 500 – The final race where 115-inch wheelbase cars (Gen 2) were eligible to run, the field was a mix of 1977 racecars and 1981 models. Dale Earnhardt drove a 1981 Pontiac while race winner Bobby Allison drove a 1977 Monte Carlo. This race was also the first of what would be 788 consecutive Cup series starts for Ricky Rudd.
1. #28 - Bobby Allison
2. #44 - Terry Labonte
3. #2 - Dale Earnhardt
4. #3 - Richard Childress
5. #42 - Richard Petty
6. #78 - Jim Robinson
7. #90 - Jody Ridley
8. #86 - Elliott Forbes-Robinson
9. #67 - Buddy Arrington
10. #38 - Don Waterman

- Busch Clash - Seven drivers were invited to the 3rd annual Busch Clash for pole winners from 1980. Darrell Waltrip led 13 of 20 laps to win the event, pocketing $71,500 for his 15-minute, 52 second run.
1. #11 - Darrell Waltrip
2. #15 - Benny Parsons
3. #1 - Buddy Baker
4. #16 - David Pearson
5. #27 - Cale Yarborough
6. #28 - Bobby Allison
7. #12 - Donnie Allison

- UNO Twin 125's– The new cars proved to be disturbingly ill-handling and there were several airborne crashes in testing and preliminary events. In the first 125 John Anderson and Connie Saylor flew off the ground and tumbled. Bobby Allison drove a Pontiac LeMans, which unlike the other makes sported a sloped tear glass and was notably more stable. He won the pole and his 125 under yellow for the Saylor crash. Darrell Waltrip in a notch backed Buick engaged in a very spirited duel. Following rookie Tim Richmond’s crash the race ended in a one lap sprint; Benny Parsons stormed from third to the lead but Waltrip re-passed him on the tri-oval apron for the win.

Race 1:

1. #28 - Bobby Allison
2. #21 - Neil Bonnett
3. #88 - Ricky Rudd
4. #2 - Dale Earnhardt
5. #16 - David Pearson
6. #42 - Kyle Petty
7. #93 - Don Whittington
8. #71 - Dave Marcis
9. #19 - Ronnie Sanders
10. #25 - Ronnie Thomas

Race 2:

1. #11 - Darrell Waltrip
2. #15 - Benny Parsons
3. #1 - Buddy Baker
4. #43 - Richard Petty
5. #51 - A.J. Foyt
6. #44 - Terry Labonte
7. #23 - Geoff Bodine
8. #9 - Bill Elliott
9. #3 - Richard Childress
10. #67 - Buddy Arrington

- 1981 Daytona 500 Consolation Race - The 12 cars that failed to qualify for the Daytona 500 were allowed to run in a consolation race for 30 laps (75 mi (121 km)). This was the first time there was a consolation race since 1962. Lake Speed led all 30 laps to win and take home $5,000.
1. #66 - Lake Speed
2. #8 - Dick May
3. #73 - Steve Moore
4. #45 - Baxter Price
5. #59 - A.C. York
6. #08 - Alan Rogers
7. #17 - Jerry Lovell
8. #61 - Tommy Hilbert
9. #94 - Bobby Wawak
10. #01 - Dickie Boswell

- Daytona 500- NASCAR increased spoiler size twice during the week to keep the cars on the ground. The ensuing 500 saw only four minor cautions and 49 lead changes. Bobby Allison’s 1981 Pontiac LeMans was as expected from Thursday more stable and faster, but Richard Petty got out to the lead after his last pitstop by not changing tires; once in the lead he was uncatchable by Allison as he took his seventh and final Daytona 500 win.
1. #43 - Richard Petty
2. #28 - Bobby Allison
3. #88 - Ricky Rudd
4. #1 - Buddy Baker
5. #2 - Dale Earnhardt
6. #9 - Bill Elliott
7. #90 - Jody Ridley
8. #27 - Cale Yarborough
9. #75 - Joe Millikan
10. #98 - Johnny Rutherford

- Richmond 400– Darrell Waltrip drove Junior Johnson's Buick to his first win of the season, edging Ricky Rudd, driving Waltrip's former car, the DiGard Oldsmobile. Bobby Allison wrecked his Pontiac LeMans and drove Butch Lindley's car rather than run a backup Oldsmobile in the team's shop for fear NASCAR would use the existence of the backup to justify banning the LeMans altogether.
1. #11 - Darrell Waltrip
2. #88 - Ricky Rudd
3. #43 - Richard Petty
4. #5 - Morgan Shepherd
5. #15 - Benny Parsons
6. #47 - Harry Gant
7. #2 - Dale Earnhardt
8. #90 - Jody Ridley
9. #75 - Joe Millikan
10. #70 - J.D. McDuffie

- Carolina 500 - Cale Yarborough won the pole and led 320 laps but ran dry in the final 25 laps. Richard Petty led until three laps to go as Darrell Waltrip outlasted the field to win. The lead changed a track-record 36 times. This was the last race that Richard Petty would lead the Winston Cup points standings in his career. ESPN made their NASCAR broadcasting debut.
1. #11 - Darrell Waltrip
2. #27 - Cale Yarborough
3. #43 - Richard Petty
4. #21 - Neil Bonnett
5. #1 - Buddy Baker
6. #28 - Bobby Allison
7. #75 - Joe Millikan
8. #42 - Kyle Petty
9. #66 - Lake Speed
10. #86 - Elliott Forbes-Robinson

- Atlanta 500 – Team owner Harry Ranier protested NASCAR-mandated spoiler reduction to the Pontiac LeMans the team was running but got no support from rival teams. Cale Yarborough edged Harry Gant for the win while Dave Marcis flipped his car after sliding hard into a giant truck tire shielding the pit wall abutment.
1. #27 - Cale Yarborough
2. #47 - Harry Gant
3. #2 - Dale Earnhardt
4. #28 - Bobby Allison
5. #15 - Benny Parsons
6. #90 - Jody Ridley
7. #51 - A.J. Foyt
8. #5 - Morgan Shepherd
9. #9 - Bill Elliott
10. #6 - Joe Ruttman

- Southeastern 500 - Waltrip led 323 laps and edged Ricky Rudd for the win, his third of the season. There were eight caution flags, one of them involving a hard set-to between Benny Parsons and Joe Millikan. "I admit I lost my cool," Millikan said, to which team owner Bud Moore replied, "I'll straighten out Millikan's cool."
1. #11 - Darrell Waltrip
2. #88 - Ricky Rudd
3. #28 - Bobby Allison
4. #5 - Morgan Shepherd
5. #15 - Benny Parsons
6. #90 - Jody Ridley
7. #44 - Terry Labonte
8. #48 - Harry Gant
9. #66 - Lake Speed
10. #99 - Tim Richmond

- Northwestern Bank 400 -
1. #43 - Richard Petty
2. #28 - Bobby Allison
3. #11 - Darrell Waltrip
4. #71 - Dave Marcis
5. #12 - Harry Gant
6. #88 - Ricky Rudd
7. #44 - Terry Labonte
8. #47 - Ron Bouchard
9. #5 - Morgan Shepherd
10. #2 - Dale Earnhardt

- Rebel 500 – Waltrip edged Gant, who was making his debut in a Pontiac Grand Prix owned by Burt Reynolds and Hal Needham. Bobby Allison debuted a new Buick as the team gave up on the LeMans because of NASCAR spoiler reduction on the car.
1. #11 - Darrell Waltrip
2. #33 - Harry Gant
3. #71 - Dave Marcis
4. #9 - Bill Elliott
5. #15 - Benny Parsons
6. #1 - Buddy Baker
7. #90 - Jody Ridley
8. #16 - David Pearson
9. #28 - Bobby Allison
10. #75 - Joe Millikan

- Virginia 500– Rookie Morgan Shepherd dominated en route to his first career Grand National win.
1. #5 - Morgan Shepherd
2. #21 - Neil Bonnett
3. #88 - Ricky Rudd
4. #12 - Harry Gant
5. #44 - Terry Labonte
6. #90 - Jody Ridley
7. #66 - Lake Speed
8. #67 - Buddy Arrington
9. #47 - Ron Bouchard
10. #37 - Mike Alexander

- Winston 500 – Allison slugged it out with Waltrip, Rudd, and Buddy Baker en route to a wild last-lap win.
1. #28 - Bobby Allison
2. #1 - Buddy Baker
3. #11 - Darrell Waltrip
4. #88 - Ricky Rudd
5. #77 - Donnie Allison
6. #99 - Tim Richmond
7. #44 - Terry Labonte
8. #2 - Dale Earnhardt
9. #25 - Dick May
10. #94 - Bobby Wawak

- Melling Tool 420 - Ricky Rudd in the DiGard No. 88 and Benny Parsons in the Bud Moore No. 15 bearing the race sponsor's colors led 419 of 420 laps; only Darrell Waltrip broke this duopoly. Waltrip futilely chased Parsons over the final 84 laps as Parsons grabbed his first win with Bud Moore.
1. #15 - Benny Parsons
2. #11 - Darrell Waltrip
3. #28 - Bobby Allison
4. #43 - Richard Petty
5. #88 - Ricky Rudd
6. #44 - Terry Labonte
7. #42 - Kyle Petty
8. #5 - Morgan Shepherd
9. #67 - Buddy Arrington
10. #71 - Dave Marcis

- Mason-Dixon 500 - David Pearson won the pole in the Kenny Childers No. 12 and led the first 41 laps before falling out with engine failure. Neil Bonnett in the Wood Brothers No. 21 led 404 laps but blew up with 41 laps to go; twenty laps later Cale Yarborough blew his engine and this left Jody Ridley effectively alone to the checkered. It was Ridley's only Winston Cup win, coming in his 55th start, and it was the only Cup win for team owner Junie Donlavey.
1. #90 - Jody Ridley
2. #28 - Bobby Allison
3. #2 - Dale Earnhardt
4. #99 - D.K. Ulrich
5. #88 - Ricky Rudd
6. #5 - Morgan Shepherd
7. #67 - Buddy Arrington
8. #44 - Terry Labonte
9. #52 - Jimmy Means
10. #27 - Cale Yarborough

- World 600 – Allison won in a crash-torn race in which his brother Donnie suffered a serious leg injury.
1. #28 - Bobby Allison
2. #33 - Harry Gant
3. #27 - Cale Yarborough
4. #88 - Ricky Rudd
5. #42 - Kyle Petty
6. #5 - Morgan Shepherd
7. #6 - Joe Ruttman
8. #75 - Joe Millikan
9. #11 - Darrell Waltrip
10. #86 - Elliott Forbes-Robinson

- Budweiser 400 - Benny Parsons and Dale Earnhardt squared off in a hard-fought race as the lead changed 35 official times, the most in Texas World Speedway's history. Parsons edged Earnhardt after five lead changes between them in the final eleven laps. The 1981 race proved to be the final major stock car race at the troubled Texas superspeedway until Ishin Speed Sport took it over ten years later.
1. #15 - Benny Parsons
2. #2 - Dale Earnhardt
3. #28 - Bobby Allison
4. #43 - Richard Petty
5. #71 - Dave Marcis
6. #90 - Jody Ridley
7. #99 - Tim Richmond
8. #66 - Lake Speed
9. #6 - Joe Ruttman
10. #33 - Harry Gant

- Warner W. Hodgdon 400 - Waltrip got back to victory in a four-car scramble with Earnhardt, Petty, and Bonnett. Crashes eliminated Bobby Allison, rookies Tim Richmond and Morgan Shepherd, and James Hylton.
1. #11 - Darrell Waltrip
2. #2 - Dale Earnhardt
3. #43 - Richard Petty
4. #21 - Neil Bonnett
5. #88 - Ricky Rudd
6. #42 - Kyle Petty
7. #90 - Jody Ridley
8. #0 - Roy Smith
9. #71 - Dave Marcis
10. #78 - Jim Robinson

- Gabriel 400 – After 50 lead changes Bobby Allison was running seventh when Kyle Petty's blown engine sent four of the top six in the field into the Turn Two guardrail, while race leaders Dale Earnhardt and Darrell Waltrip crashed before Turn Three. The win put Allison nearly 300 points ahead of Waltrip in the standings. Following the race Earnhardt's team owner Rod Osterlund sold the team to J. D. Stacy.
1. #28 - Bobby Allison
2. #33 - Harry Gant
3. #15 - Benny Parsons
4. #90 - Jody Ridley
5. #2 - Dale Earnhardt
6. #43 - Richard Petty
7. #11 - Darrell Waltrip
8. #27 - Cale Yarborough
9. #21 - Neil Bonnett
10. #47 - Ron Bouchard

- Firecracker 400 - Bobby Allison has taken a 256-point lead over Darrell Waltrip but after burning a valve and finishing 28th his point lead fell to 206. Cale Yarborough won the pole and led 78 laps while Harry Gant led 43 laps; Gant took the lead on Lap 138 but Cale stormed past for the win on the final lap. Dale Earnhardt led the opening lap in the first race with J. D. Stacy as new owner of the former Rod Osterlund Pontiac, but fell out with a vibration after 71 laps.
1. #27 - Cale Yarborough
2. #33 - Harry Gant
3. #43 - Richard Petty
4. #1 - Buddy Baker
5. #98 - Johnny Rutherford
6. #42 - Kyle Petty
7. #37 - Mike Alexander
8. #44 - Terry Labonte
9. #47 - Ron Bouchard
10. #11 - Darrell Waltrip

- Busch Nashville 420 - Waltrip led 303 laps and edged Allison for the win, with May winner Benny Parsons third. Rookie Mark Martin, a star in American Speed Association stockers, won the pole and led the opening 36 laps.
1. #11 - Darrell Waltrip
2. #28 - Bobby Allison
3. #15 - Benny Parsons
4. #88 - Ricky Rudd
5. #44 - Terry Labonte
6. #42 - Kyle Petty
7. #2 - Dale Earnhardt
8. #33 - Harry Gant
9. #43 - Richard Petty
10. #90 - Jody Ridley

- Mountain Dew 500 - Six years after the 1975 Purolator 500 and the controversial win by a Purolator-sponsored car, Darrell Waltrip's Buick with the race's sponsor took the win amid controversy. Cale Yarborough fell a lap down but got it back, but he pitted too early on a late yellow and lost the lap again. He stormed past Richard Petty on a last-lap restart thinking he was the leader, and Waltrip took the lead from Petty for the win. Yarborough initially protested the outcome thinking he was on the lead lap, but NASCAR score cards showed Waltrip indeed was the leader.
1. #11 - Darrell Waltrip
2. #43 - Richard Petty
3. #15 - Benny Parsons
4. #33 - Harry Gant
5. #27 - Cale Yarborough
6. #88 - Ricky Rudd
7. #1 - Buddy Baker
8. #42 - Kyle Petty
9. #12 - Tim Richmond
10. #47 - Ron Bouchard

- Talladega 500 – Bobby Allison led the most laps but slipped back in the final laps, leaving Darrell Waltrip, Terry Labonte, and rookie Ron Bouchard in contention for the win. On the final lap in Talladega's trioval, Labonte swung high on Waltrip and as the two jostled, Bouchard dove to the bottom and beat them to the line by inches. Bouchard's victory is considered by many to be one of the biggest upsets in NASCAR history. Dale Earnhardt finished 29th in his final race in the J. D. Stacy car after a falling out with the new owner. He would finish out the season driving Richard Childress's car.
1. #47 - Ron Bouchard
2. #11 - Darrell Waltrip
3. #44 - Terry Labonte
4. #33 - Harry Gant
5. #28 - Bobby Allison
6. #66 - Lake Speed
7. #42 - Kyle Petty
8. #90 - Jody Ridley
9. #22 - Stan Barrett
10. #71 - Dave Marcis

- Champion Spark Plug 400 – Richard Petty stormed past five cars with five laps to go and held off Waltrip and Ricky Rudd in the most competitive race of the season (65 lead changes, a still-standing record for Michigan International Speedway, among 14 drivers). Dale Earnhardt, in his first start for new owner retired driver Richard Childress, finished 9th.
1. #43 - Richard Petty
2. #11 - Darrell Waltrip
3. #88 - Ricky Rudd
4. #33 - Harry Gant
5. #1 - Buddy Baker
6. #2 - Joe Ruttman
7. #28 - Bobby Allison
8. #9 - Bill Elliott
9. #3 - Dale Earnhardt
10. #37 - Mike Alexander

- Busch 500 -
1. #11 - Darrell Waltrip
2. #88 - Ricky Rudd
3. #44 - Terry Labonte
4. #28 - Bobby Allison
5. #47 - Ron Bouchard
6. #15 - Benny Parsons
7. #66 - Lake Speed
8. #12 - Tim Richmond
9. #71 - Dave Marcis
10. #67 - Buddy Arrington

- Southern 500 - Neil Bonnett led 216 laps and edged Darrell Waltrip by one car length; Waltrip's runner-up finish pulled him to within 18 points of Bobby Allison.
1. #21 - Neil Bonnett
2. #11 - Darrell Waltrip
3. #71 - Dave Marcis
4. #44 - Terry Labonte
5. #1 - Buddy Baker
6. #3 - Dale Earnhardt
7. #9 - Bill Elliott
8. #01 - David Pearson
9. #28 - Bobby Allison
10. #27 - Cale Yarborough

- Wrangler Sanfor-Set 400 - Benny Parsons scores his 20th and penultimate victory in the Cup Series. Bobby Allison finishes fifth leading 95 laps but Darrell Waltrip finishes third leading the most laps at 149 which cuts Allison's lead down to 3 points.
1. #15 - Benny Parsons
2. #33 - Harry Gant
3. #11 - Darrell Waltrip
4. #44 - Terry Labonte
5. #28 - Bobby Allison
6. #3 - Dale Earnhardt
7. #02 - Mark Martin
8. #5 - Joe Millikan
9. #90 - Jody Ridley
10. #75 - Gary Balough

- CRC Chemicals 500 - Neil Bonnett put the entire field a lap down as he led 185 laps en route to his second win in three races. Darrell Waltrip beat Bobby Allison for second and thus took the point lead by 2 points over Allison.
1. #21 - Neil Bonnett
2. #11 - Darrell Waltrip
3. #28 - Bobby Allison
4. #47 - Ron Bouchard
5. #88 - Ricky Rudd
6. #2 - Joe Ruttman
7. #42 - Kyle Petty
8. #71 - Dave Marcis
9. #37 - Tim Richmond
10. #43 - Richard Petty

- Old Dominion 500 - Harry Gant led the most laps at 253 but faltered as Darrell Waltrip grabbed the lead with 36 laps to go; Waltrip's win was the first of four straight. Waltrip padded his lead by 41 points to lead Allison by 43 points.
1. #11 - Darrell Waltrip
2. #33 - Harry Gant
3. #02 - Mark Martin
4. #21 - Neil Bonnett
5. #5 - Joe Millikan
6. #47 - Ron Bouchard
7. #24 - Jimmy Hensley
8. #88 - Ricky Rudd
9. #44 - Terry Labonte
10. #28 - Bobby Allison

- Holly Farms 400 - Darrell Waltrip wins his second straight race while leading the most laps at 318. Bobby Allison finished second leading seventy six laps. Waltrip padded his lead by 10 points to lead Allison by 53 points.
1. #11 - Darrell Waltrip
2. #28 - Bobby Allison
3. #5 - Joe Millikan
4. #3 - Dale Earnhardt
5. #47 - Ron Bouchard
6. #24 - Morgan Shepherd
7. #90 - Jody Ridley
8. #99 - Bob McElwee
9. #52 - Jimmy Means
10. #67 - Buddy Arrington

- National 500 - Neil Bonnett dominates leading 135 of the races first 190 laps but then before he can complete lap 191 his engine expires, leaving Darrell Waltrip to battle with Bobby Allison for the rest of the race in which Waltrip prevails, winning his third straight race while padding his points lead by 5 to lead over Allison by 58 points.
1. #11 - Darrell Waltrip
2. #28 - Bobby Allison
3. #88 - Ricky Rudd
4. #55 - Tommy Ellis
5. #47 - Ron Bouchard
6. #72 - Rusty Wallace
7. #01 - Geoff Bodine
8. #24 - Morgan Shepherd
9. #13 - Jack Ingram
10. #67 - Buddy Arrington

- American 500 - Waltrip and Allison fought for the win as the lead changed between them during the final 19 laps; with his fourth straight win Waltrip increased his point lead by 10 points to lead Allison by 68 points.
1. #11 - Darrell Waltrip
2. #28 - Bobby Allison
3. #33 - Harry Gant
4. #43 - Richard Petty
5. #2 - Joe Ruttman
6. #15 - Benny Parsons
7. #44 - Terry Labonte
8. #9 - Bill Elliott
9. #3 - Dale Earnhardt
10. #90 - Jody Ridley

- Atlanta Journal 500 - ESPN broadcast the race live, the first such NASCAR broadcast for the third-year cable network, with Mike Joy, Larry Nuber, and Ned Jarrett handling the broadcast duty. The race was a hard-fought affair as Neil Bonnett battled Richard Petty, Joe Ruttman, and Harry Gant; Waltrip cut a tire in mid-race but battled and got his lap back; he rallied and took the lead at the white flag, but Bonnett stormed to the win while Waltrip padded his points lead by 15 points to lead Allison headed to the season finale at Riverside by 83 points.
1. #21 - Neil Bonnett
2. #11 - Darrell Waltrip
3. #27 - Cale Yarborough
4. #28 - Bobby Allison
5. #90 - Jody Ridley
6. #9 - Bill Elliott
7. #44 - Terry Labonte
8. #42 - Kyle Petty
9. #1 - Buddy Baker
10. #5 - Joe Millikan

- Winston Western 500 - For the first time in the modern era the series visited the same track three times in a season. This would not happen again until 2020, when the COVID-19 pandemic forced NASCAR to make schedule changes due to a combination of local, state, and federal travel restrictions and limits on social gatherings. This race featured a great battle for the win between Allison and Ruttman for the last 20 laps. Bobby passed Joe with 9 laps to go and Ruttman got back alongside Allison several times but was never able to complete the pass. Allison did what he needed to do by winning the race and leading the most laps at 49. It was however not enough as Darrell Waltrip won his first championship by leading 1 lap & finishing in 6th place to beat Allison by 53 points.
1. #28 - Bobby Allison
2. #2 - Joe Ruttman
3. #44 - Terry Labonte
4. #3 - Dale Earnhardt
5. #5 - Joe Millikan
6. #11 - Darrell Waltrip
7. #43 - Richard Petty
8. #33 - Harry Gant
9. #90 - Jody Ridley
10. #47 - Ron Bouchard

== Final point standings ==
(key) Bold – Pole position awarded by time. Italics – Pole position set by owner's points. * – Most laps led.

Pos.	Driver	RIV	DAY	RCH	CAR	ATL	BRI	NWS	DAR	MAR	TAL	NSV	DOV	CLT	TWS	RIV	MCH	DAY	NSV	POC	TAL	MCH	BRI	DAR	RCH	DOV	MAR	NWS	CLT	CAR	ATL	RIV	Pts
1	Darrell Waltrip	**17**	36	1*	1	36	**1***	3	1*	26	3	2	12	9	30	**1***	**7***	10	1*	**1***	2	2	**1***	2	3*	2	**1**	**1***	**1***	**1***	2	**6**	4880
2	Bobby Allison	1*	**2***	23	6	4	3	2*	9	13	**1**	3	2	1*	3	29	1	28	2	25	5*	7	4	9	5	3	10	2	2	2	4	1*	4827
3	Harry Gant	15	23	6	18	2*	8	5	2	4*	34	22	16	2	10	31	2	2	8	4	**4**	4	11	**14**	2	23	2*	24	41	3	**20**	8	4210
4	Terry Labonte	2	40	26	21	**19**	7	7	14	5	7	6	8	14	**23**	22	11	8	5	13	3	14	3	4	4	29	9	30	23	7	7	3	4052
5	Jody Ridley	7	7	8	17	6	6	28	7	6	31	25	1	20	6	7	4	38	10	15	8	12	20	12	9	11	21	7	15	10	5	9	4002
6	Ricky Rudd	19	3	2	31	22	2	6	11	**3**	4	**5***	5	4	24	5	30	40	4	6	23	3	2	23	12	**5**	8	25	3	18	38	40	3988
7	Dale Earnhardt	3	5	7	26	3	28	10	17	25	8	20	3	18	2*	2	5	35	7	11	29	9	27	6	6	15	26	4	25	9	24	4	3975
8	Richard Petty	5	1	3	3	38	29	1	33	28	39	4	19	24	4	3	6	3	9	2	40	1*	24	30	11	10	18	21	30	4	26	7	3880
9	Dave Marcis	28	15	22	15	27	31	**4**	3	11	14	10	31	35	5	9	29	13	25	33	10	11	9	3	19	8	14	16	40	12	28	25	3507
10	Benny Parsons	16	31	5	24	5	5	21	5	23	36	1	32	37	1	20	3	39	3	3	13	26	6	39	1	34	24	29	38	6	36	27	3449
11	Buddy Arrington	9	26	16	37	14	13	29	13	8	17	9	7	15	13	26	12	17	28	16	41	35	10	37	13	14	11	10	10	14	17	24	3381
12	Kyle Petty	20	32	24	8	41	11	22	25	15	30	7	20	5	29	6	21	6	6	8	7	19	28	34	22	7	19	18	20	37	8	37	3335
13	Morgan Shepherd **(R)**			**4**	28	8	4	9	34	1	23	8	6	6	31	21	15	20	13	29	36	34	19	16	29	12	28	6	8	27	31	13	3261
14	Jimmy Means	18	21	14	29	21	14	14	23	12	27	14	9	23	19	28	28	18	15	19	16	25	12	38	16	19	15	9	12	20	35		3142
15	Tommy Gale		17	18	19	18	15	19	18	18	11	17	14	17	12	30	36	19	21	31	18	21	15	29	17	24	13	14	22	13	22	26	3140
16	Tim Richmond **(R)**	29	30	17	16	26	10	18	12	14	6	12			7	33	14	15	12	9	34	30	8	22	14	9	20	13	18	22	21	20	3091
17	J. D. McDuffie	23	24	10	33	11	22	16	16	30	22	16	23	13	11	12	22	12	20	18		16	13	21	21		28		12	17	23	11	2996
18	Lake Speed	34	DNQ	12	9	35	9	23		7	18	24		28	8		16	33	22	27	6	15	7	13	20	27	22	27	34	31	14	16	2817
19	James Hylton	11	34	29	20	25		15	19	17	19	21	18	16	25	19	23	22	16	22	39	27	16	26	18	32		15		26	19	17	2753
20	Joe Millikan	13	9	9	7	15	17	26	10	29	38			8			31					23	17	18	8	21	5	3	35	19	10	5	2682
21	Ron Bouchard **(R)**						24	8	27	9	20		27	26			10	9		10	1	**29**	5	11	25	4	6	5	5	11	39	10	2594
22	Neil Bonnett	27	33		4	28			29	2	32		13*	**29**		4	9	30		34	37	28		1*		1	4		29	35	1*	33	2449
23	Cecil Gordon	36	37	19	23	37	21	31	21	24	15	19	15		18	13	27	25	29	21	17	24	30		23	26		19		15			2320
24	Cale Yarborough		8		**2***	1			26	21	24		10	3			8	**1***		5	28	17		10		13			31	25	3		2201
25	Richard Childress	4	38	13	22	17	16	17	31	22	13	13	17	19	14	18	19	21	17	23	26											39	2144
26	Ronnie Thomas		28	21	11	31	18	12	20	31	26		24	22	20	34	25		14	35			18	27	24	20	27	17	32				2138
27	Buddy Baker		4		5	40			6		2*			33			13	4		7	32	5		5			29		37	16	9		1904
28	Joe Ruttman **(R)**					10					29			7	9			29			22	6	21	15	30	6	17	26	19	5	25	2	1851
29	Mike Alexander **(R)**				13	33	12	11	36	10	21	11	21	27			32	7	27	17	35	10	25	20	32						DNQ		1784
30	Bill Elliott		6			9			**4**		40			40			35	34			11	8		7					33	8	6		1442
31	Bobby Wawak		DNQ		14	42		30	24	19	10	18		31	26		33				19	31		24					36		DNQ		1212
32	D. K. Ulrich						19	13	22			23	4		32	27	20		23					31	21	18			14	17	27		1191
33	Johnny Rutherford		10		12	12			28								17	5				13		33	31				27	29	37		1140
34	Lennie Pond		27	11										11				11			24		14	17	27	16	25	23		36			1100
35	Elliott Forbes-Robinson **(R)**	8	25		10	39	27				16			10		35		23			12		23										1020
36	Stan Barrett **(R)**		13		36	16					35			32		11	18	26		14	9												842
37	Rick Newsom			27	32	20	23				33			DNQ	28					26			22					22					768
38	Dick May		DNQ			24				9			25	16			31			15	36		19		25						DNQ		754
39	Connie Saylor **(R)**		DNQ								37			12				14			33			40					11		12		664
40	Gary Balough **(R)**																			12	25	18	Wth	25	10	17	Wth		24	32	34	19	656
41	Rick Wilson		DNQ		35						25			42			37	42			20								13		11		639
42	Mark Martin							27				27							**11**						**7**		3						615
43	Bruce Hill		39			23	26				28			41				16			30	33									DNQ		596
44	Donnie Allison		12		34	29					5		11	38																			527
45	Geoff Bodine		22						30																		23		7		30		420
46	Joe Fields			28				25		16			22												15		DNQ			23			418
47	Jack Ingram													34				37			38			32					13				377
48	Randy Ogden													DNQ	22	15	34		24														367
49	Don Waterman	10														23																15	351
50	Jim Robinson	6														10																32	351
51	Rusty Wallace													30							21								6		29		323
52	Tommy Houston							20		20	12			DNQ				27	19								12	11					315
53	Bill Schmitt	22														24																14	314
54	Don Whittington	14	14																													35	300
55	Dick Brooks		16						15					36																21	13		294
56	H. B. Bailey		DNQ												15									36					16		40		288
57	Lowell Cowell												28		17					28						22							288
58	Roy Smith	31														8																30	285
59	Don Puskarich	32														17																21	279
60	Glenn Jarrett		19	25	27																												276
61	A. J. Foyt		35			7												32															271
62	Butch Lindley						25	24		27																							271
63	Tommy Ellis																								26		30		4		33		224
64	Don Sprouse	DNQ	20	15																													221
65	Slick Johnson				25	34			32															35									216
66	Hershel McGriff	33														25																38	206
67	Chuck Bown													39																28	15		197
68	Junior Miller												26	DNQ														20					188
69	David Pearson		29		30	32			8				**25**											8									154
70	Bob Schacht																					32				30					DNQ		140
71	Bob Riley												30							32						33							131
72	John Borneman	12																															127
73	Gary Kershaw																															12	127
74	Jim Bown	DNQ														32																36	122
75	Rick O'Dell															16																	115
76	Ronnie Sanders		19																												DNQ		109
77	Delma Cowart																														18		106
78	Steve Spencer					30	20												18														103
79	Henry Jones	DNQ	DNQ	20							DNQ																						103
80	Bob Bondurant	21																														18	100
81	Bill Dennis													21																			100
82	Joe Booher																24			20	42	22											97
83	Gene Thonesen																															22	97
84	Mark Stahl																															23	94
85	Bill Elswick		11			13												24															91
86	Steve Pfeifer	24														14																	91
87	John Gunn	25																															88
88	Charlie Glotzbach																												26				85
89	Rick McCray	26																															85
90	Roger Hamby														27																		82
91	Billie Harvey		41															41			Wth										DNQ		80
92	Mike Potter								35			15					26				27		26	28									79
93	Sterling Marlin																		26										28				79
94	Dave Dion																								28								79
95	Scott Miller																															29	76
96	Elmo Langley												29																				76
97	Baxter Price		DNQ	30											34																		73
98	Jimmy Insolo	30														36																	73
99	Ernie Cline						30																										73
100	Jocko Maggiacomo																									31							70
101	Sandy Satullo II																				31												70
102	Travis Tiller													DNQ																	32		64
103	Pat Mintey																															34	61
104	Robert Tartaglia	35																															58
105	Kevin Housby																	36															55
106	Blackie Wangerin		42											DNQ																			37
107	John Anderson		DNQ																										39	24	16		
108	Bob McElwee																										16	8					
109	Terry Herman																				14											31	
110	Dean Combs																											28		34			
111	Jimmy Hensley																										7						
112	Rick Knoop																					20											
113	Rick Baldwin														21																		
114	Bob Senneker																												21				
115	Al Loquasto																			24													
116	Charlie Chamblee											26																					
117	Chuck Pittenger																															28	
118	Joel Stowe																						29										
119	Bruce Jacobi																			30													
120	Don Satterfield																		30														
121	Don Hume																													33			
122	Kirk Shelmerdine														33																		
123	Harry Dinwiddie	DNQ	DNQ								DNQ																						
124	Dickie Boswell		DNQ																														
125	Tom Sneva		DNQ																														
126	Alan Rogers		DNQ																														
127	Jerry Lovall		DNQ																														
128	A. C. York		DNQ																														
129	Sal Tovella		DNQ																														
130	Tommy Hilbert		DNQ																														
131	Steve Moore		DNQ																		DNQ												
132	Hurley Haywood																	DNQ															
133	Eddie Falk																										DNQ						
134	Wayne Morgan																										DNQ						
135	Don Stanley																															DNQ	
136	Ferrel Harris																															DNQ	
Pos.	Driver	RIV	DAY	RCH	CAR	ATL	BRI	NWS	DAR	MAR	TAL	NSV	DOV	CLT	TWS	RIV	MCH	DAY	NSV	POC	TAL	MCH	BRI	DAR	RCH	DOV	MAR	NWS	CLT	CAR	ATL	RIV	Pts

- Earnhardt drove races 1–20 in the No. 2 Rod Osterlund Wrangler Jeans Pontiac Grand Prix but left the team when Osterlund sold it to J. D. Stacy. He finished the season driving for Richard Childress in the No. 3 Wrangler Pontiac Grand Prix.

== See also ==
- 1981 NASCAR Winston West Series
