= 1979 Firecracker 400 =

Auto race held at Daytona International Speedway in 1979

Race details
- Race 17 of 31 in the 1979 NASCAR Winston Cup Series season
- The 1979 Firecracker 400 program cover. "We Are America Day"
- Date: July 4, 1979
- Official name: Firecracker 400
- Location: Daytona International Speedway, Daytona Beach, Florida
- Course: Permanent racing facility
- Course length: 4.023 km (2.500 miles)
- Distance: 160 laps, 400 mi (643 km)
- Weather: Hot with temperatures of 93.9 °F (34.4 °C); wind speeds of 12 miles per hour (19 km/h) with 0.28 inches (7.1 mm) of rain reported within 24 hours of the racing event
- Average speed: 172.89 miles per hour (278.24 km/h)
- Attendance: 45,000

Pole position
Driver	Buddy Baker	Ranier Racing

Most laps led
Driver	Neil Bonnett	Wood Brothers Racing
- Laps: 77

Winner
No. 21	Neil Bonnett	Wood Brothers Racing

Television in the United States
- Network: ABC's Wide World Of Sports
- Announcers: Bill Flemming & Sam Posey

Radio in the United States
- Radio: Motor Racing Network
- Booth announcers: Jack Arute & Barney Hall
- Turn announcers: Turns 1 & 2: Mike Joy; Backstreatch: Hal Hamrick; Turns 3 & 4: Eli Gold; Pit Reporter: Ned Jarrett

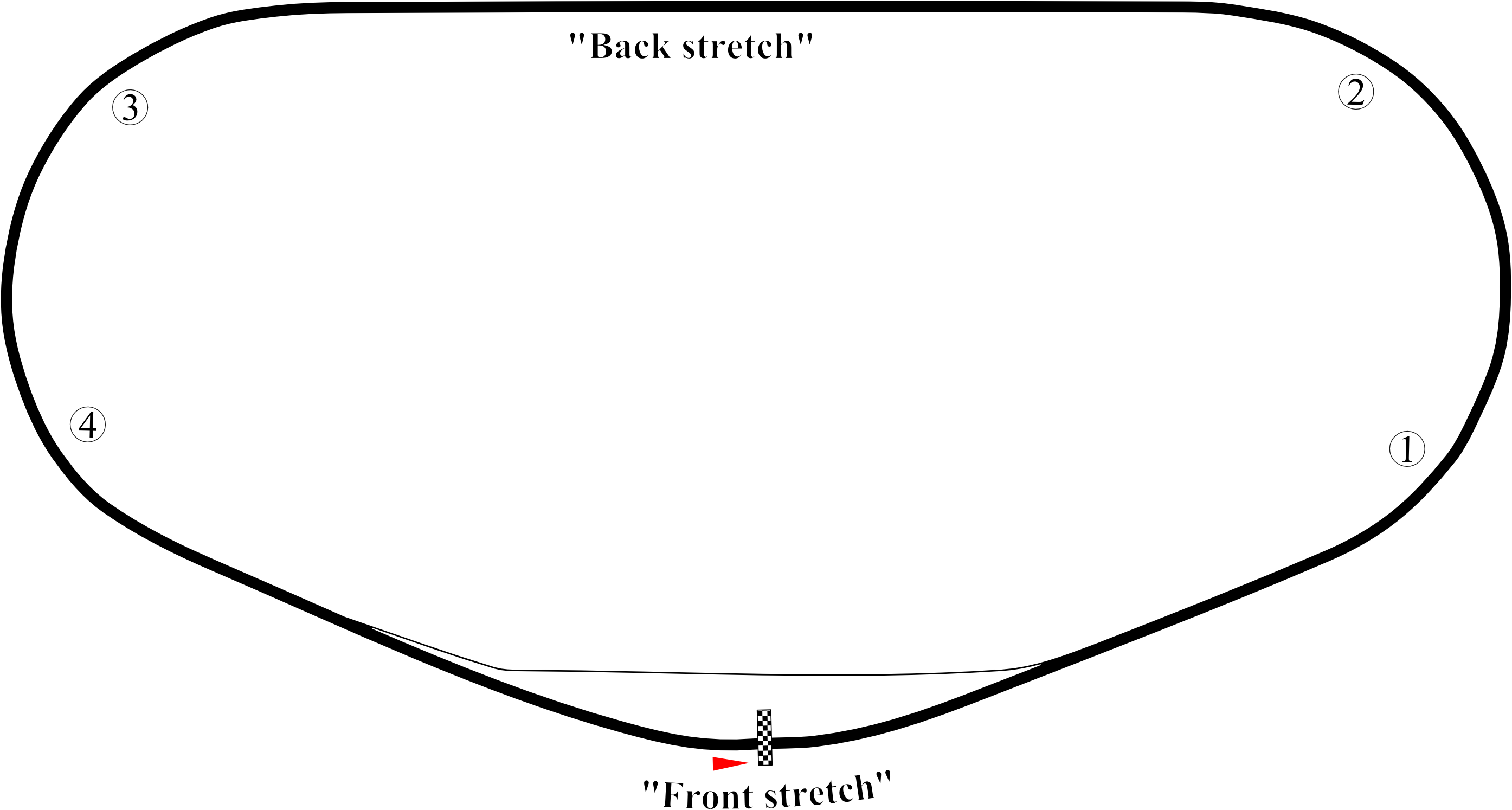
The layout of Daytona International Speedway, the venue where the race was held.

The 1979 Firecracker 400 was a NASCAR Winston Cup Series racing event that took place on July 4, 1979, at Daytona International Speedway in Daytona Beach, Florida.

== Race report ==
There were 41 drivers on the starting grid of this race; Bruce Hill was credited with the last-place finish due to an engine problem on the first lap. Fifteen drivers would fail to finish the race with problems varying from engine trouble, blown tires, and crashes. Claude Ballot-Léna from France would make his final NASCAR Cup Series appearance here; winning $1,130. ($4,895.63 when adjusted for inflation). His race ended on lap 83 of 160 with engine problems.

Forty-five thousand fans were in attendance. The average speed was a record 172.89 miles per hour (278.24 km/h). The green flag waved at 10 a.m. Buddy Baker earned the pole position during qualifying with a speed of 193.196 miles per hour (310.919 km/h). Darrell Waltrip would become a frequent contender for the first-place position along with Buddy Baker and Neil Bonnett. Bonnett would go on to defeat Benny Parsons by a single second.

Terry Labonte went head on into the outside wall in one of the corners just past the halfway point and was sliding back down the track when Bobby Allison suddenly spun sideways and clobbered the #44 right in the door. Neither driver was hurt but the heavy crash put both drivers out of the race.

Notable crew chiefs who participated in the race include Buddy Parrott, Joey Arrington, Kirk Shelmerdine, Darrell Bryant, Dale Inman, Harry Hyde, Waddell Wilson, Bud Moore, Tim Brewer, and Jake Elder.

A souvenir program was sold for $3 USD ($13 when adjusted for inflation). Kyle Petty attempted to qualify for this race, but crashed during qualifying with the consequence of having to work on his father's pit crew. He would make his NASCAR debut at Talladega.

== Qualifying ==
Buddy Baker would score the pole, averaging 193.196 miles per hour (310.919 km/h), a new track record at the time.

Grid	No.	Driver	Manufacturer	Team/Owner	Time	Avg. Speed (mph)
1	28	Buddy Baker	Oldsmobile	Ranier-Lundy Racing	46.585	193.196
2	21	Neil Bonnett	Mercury	Wood Brothers Racing	46.730	192.596
3	27	Benny Parsons	Oldsmobile	M. C. Anderson Racing	46.803	192.296
4	41	Grant Adcox	Oldsmobile	Adcox Racing	46.864	192.046
5	11	Cale Yarborough	Oldsmobile	Junior Johnson & Associates	46.889	191.943
6	88	Darrell Waltrip	Oldsmobile	DiGard Motorsports	47.067	191.205
7	67	Buddy Arrington	Dodge	Arrington Racing	47.091	191.120
8	51	A.J. Foyt	Oldsmobile	A. J. Foyt Enterprises	47.147	190.893
9	30	Tighe Scott	Buick	Ballard Racing	47.154	190.864
10	44	Terry Labonte	Buick	Hagan Racing	47.255	190.457
11	43	Richard Petty	Oldsmobile	Petty Enterprises	47.324	190.179
12	68	Chuck Bown	Buick	Testa Racing	47.392	189.906
13	12	Lennie Pond	Oldsmobile	Kennie Childers Racing	47.578	189.164
14	79	Frank Warren	Dodge	Frank Warren	47.713	188.628
15	47	Harry Gant	Oldsmobile	Race Hill Farm Team	47.765	188.423
16	3	Richard Childress	Oldsmobile	Richard Childress Racing	47.930	187.774
17	17	Roger Hamby	Oldsmobile	Hamby Racing	47.960	187.657
18	7	Al Holbert	Chevrolet	Al Holbert	47.988	187.547
19	90	Ricky Rudd	Mercury	Donlavey Racing	48.036	187.360
20	15	Bobby Allison	Ford	Bud Moore Engineering	48.046	187.321
21	2	Dale Earnhardt	Oldsmobile	Osterlund Racing	47.881	187.966
22	71	Dave Marcis	Chevrolet	Marcis Auto Racing	48.022	187.415
23	1	Donnie Allison	Chevrolet	Ellington Racing	48.116	187.048
24	72	Joe Millikan	Oldsmobile	DeWitt Racing	48.144	186.940
25	50	Bruce Hill	Buick	Ballard Racing	48.206	186.699
26	87	Gary Balough	Oldsmobile	Billie Harvey	48.300	186.336
27	9	Bill Elliott	Mercury	Elliott Racing	48.398	185.959
28	14	Coo Coo Marlin	Chevrolet	Cunningham-Kelley Racing	48.603	185.174
29	38	Sandy Satullo	Buick	Sandy Satullo	48.793	184.453
30	48	James Hylton	Chevrolet	James Hylton Motorsports	48.860	184.200
31	6	Claude Ballot-Lena	Oldsmobile	G. C. Spencer Racing	48.479	185.648
32	70	J.D. McDuffie	Chevrolet	McDuffie Racing	48.574	185.285
33	39	Blackie Wangerin	Mercury	Blackie Wangerin	48.981	183.745
34	32	Jimmy Finger	Buick	Don Bierschwale	48.987	183.723
35	40	D.K. Ulrich	Buick	Ulrich Racing	49.125	183.207
36	64	Tommy Gale	Ford	Langley Racing	49.156	183.091
37	05	Dick Brooks	Oldsmobile	Nelson Malloch Racing	49.255	182.723
38	52	Jimmy Means	Chevrolet	Jimmy Means Racing	49.350	182.371
39	46	Travis Tiller	Dodge	Travis Tiller	49.351	182.368
40	20	Rick Newsom	Oldsmobile	Rick Newsom	49.411	182.146
41 (FIA)	24	Cecil Gordon	Oldsmobile	Gordon Racing	50.654	177.676
Withdrew
WD	42	Kyle Petty	Dodge	Petty Enterprises	0.000	0.000

== Finishing order ==
Fin	St	#	Driver	Make	Team/Owner	Sponsor	Laps	Led	Status	Pts	Winnings
1	2	21	Neil Bonnett	Mercury	Wood Brothers Racing	Purolator	160	77	running	185	$21,705
2	3	27	Benny Parsons	Oldsmobile	M. C. Anderson Racing	Griffin Marine	160	6	running	175	$16,875
3	21	2	Dale Earnhardt	Oldsmobile	Osterlund Racing	Rod Osterlund	160	1	running	170	$14,980
4	6	88	Darrell Waltrip	Oldsmobile	DiGard Motorsports	Gatorade	159	54	running	165	$12,280
5	11	43	Richard Petty	Oldsmobile	Petty Enterprises	STP	158	2	running	160	$9,480
6	12	68	Chuck Bown	Buick	Testa Racing	Kings Mountain Truck Plaza	157	0	running	150	$4,990
7	15	47	Harry Gant	Oldsmobile	Race Hill Farm Team	Race Hill Farm	157	0	running	146	$4,240
8	24	72	Joe Millikan	Oldsmobile	DeWitt Racing	Appliance Wheels	156	0	running	142	$7,540
9	37	05	Dick Brooks	Oldsmobile	Nelson Malloch Racing	Sub-Tropic	156	0	running	138	$5,575
10	8	51	A.J. Foyt	Oldsmobile	A. J. Foyt Enterprises	Valvoline	156	3	running		$3,140
11	27	9	Bill Elliott	Mercury	Elliott Racing	Yandle, Thermol King, Dahlonega Ford Sales	156	0	running	130	$2,960
12	23	1	Donnie Allison	Chevrolet	Ellington Racing	Hawaiian Tropic	155	0	running	127	$2,935
13	19	90	Ricky Rudd	Mercury	Donlavey Racing	Truxmore	155	0	running	124	$5,075
14	9	30	Tighe Scott	Buick	Ballard Racing	Russ Togs	154	0	running	121	$4,865
15	7	67	Buddy Arrington	Dodge	Arrington Racing	Rossmeyer	154	0	running	118	$4,555
16	26	87	Gary Balough	Oldsmobile	Billie Harvey	Fast Lane Ltd.	154	0	running		$1,750
17	22	71	Dave Marcis	Chevrolet	Marcis Auto Racing	Shoney's	151	0	running	112	$3,635
18	35	40	D.K. Ulrich	Buick	Ulrich Racing	U.S. Army	151	0	running	109	$3,775
19	30	48	James Hylton	Chevrolet	James Hylton Motorsports	Palatine Automotive Parts	151	1	running	111	$3,415
20	5	11	Cale Yarborough	Oldsmobile	Junior Johnson & Associates	Busch Beer	149	0	running	103	$6,960
21	32	70	J.D. McDuffie	Chevrolet	McDuffie Racing	Bailey Excavating	146	0	running	100	$2,855
22	38	52	Jimmy Means	Chevrolet	Jimmy Means Racing	Mr. Transmission	146	0	running	97	$2,645
23	40	20	Rick Newsom	Oldsmobile	Rick Newsom	MARS Inc.	145	0	running	94	$1,410
24	33	39	Blackie Wangerin	Mercury	Blackie Wangerin	Wangerin Inc.	144	0	blew tire	91	$1,385
25	28	14	Coo Coo Marlin	Chevrolet	Cunningham-Kelley Racing	Cunningham-Kelley	138	0	engine	88	$1,360
26	17	17	Roger Hamby	Oldsmobile	Hamby Racing	Kings Inn	137	0	running	85	$2,260
27	36	64	Tommy Gale	Ford	Langley Racing	Sunny King Ford & Honda	121	0	rear end	82	$2,225
28	13	12	Lennie Pond	Oldsmobile	Kennie Childers Racing	Burger King	105	0	engine	79	$1,285
29	10	44	Terry Labonte	Buick	Hagan Racing	Stratagraph	89	0	crash	76	$2,165
30	20	15	Bobby Allison	Ford	Bud Moore Engineering	Hodgdon, Moore	89	0	crash	73	$4,925
31	31	6	Claude Ballot-Lena	Oldsmobile	G. C. Spencer Racing	Lady & Son Auction	83	0	engine		$1,130
32	18	7	Al Holbert	Chevrolet	Al Holbert	Holbert Porsche-Audi	82	0	spindle		$895
33	4	41	Grant Adcox	Oldsmobile	Adcox Racing	Adcox-Kirby	81	0	engine	64	$1,180
34	1	28	Buddy Baker	Oldsmobile	Ranier-Lundy Racing	W.I.N.	57	16	ignition	66	$4,225
35	41	24	Cecil Gordon	Oldsmobile	Gordon Racing	Gordon Barnical Racing	50	0	engine	58	$1,915
36	39	46	Travis Tiller	Dodge	Travis Tiller	Ring Enterprises	46	0	engine	55	$1,025
37	16	3	Richard Childress	Oldsmobile	Richard Childress Racing	CRC Chemicals	28	0	engine	52	$1,520
38	29	38	Sandy Satullo	Buick	Sandy Satullo	Copper Kettle Marina	18	0	crash	49	$1,015
39	34	32	Jimmy Finger	Buick	Don Bierschwale	Vita Fresh, Pharis Chevy	17	0	crash	46	$1,010
40	14	79	Frank Warren	Dodge	Frank Warren	Native Tan	7	0	engine	43	$1,505
41	25	50	Bruce Hill	Buick	Ballard Racing	Global Heat Exchanger	1	0	engine	40	$1,035
Withdrew
WD		42	Kyle Petty	Dodge	Petty Enterprises	STP					

== Standings after the race ==
Pos	Driver	Points	Differential
1	Darrell Waltrip	2720	0
2	Bobby Allison	2587	-133
3 ▲	Richard Petty	2522	-198
4 ▼	Cale Yarborough	2500	-220
5	Dale Earnhardt	2342	-378
6 ▲	Benny Parsons	2237	-483
7 ▼	Joe Millikan	2221	-499
8	Terry Labonte	2009	-711
9 ▲	J.D. McDuffie	1997	-723
10 ▼	Richard Childress	1983	-737

Preceded by 1979 Gabriel 400	NASCAR Winston Cup Series Season; 1979	Succeeded by 1979 Busch Nashville 420

Preceded by 1978	Firecracker 400 races 1979	Succeeded by 1980
