= Bobby Wawak =

American racing driver (1939–2004)

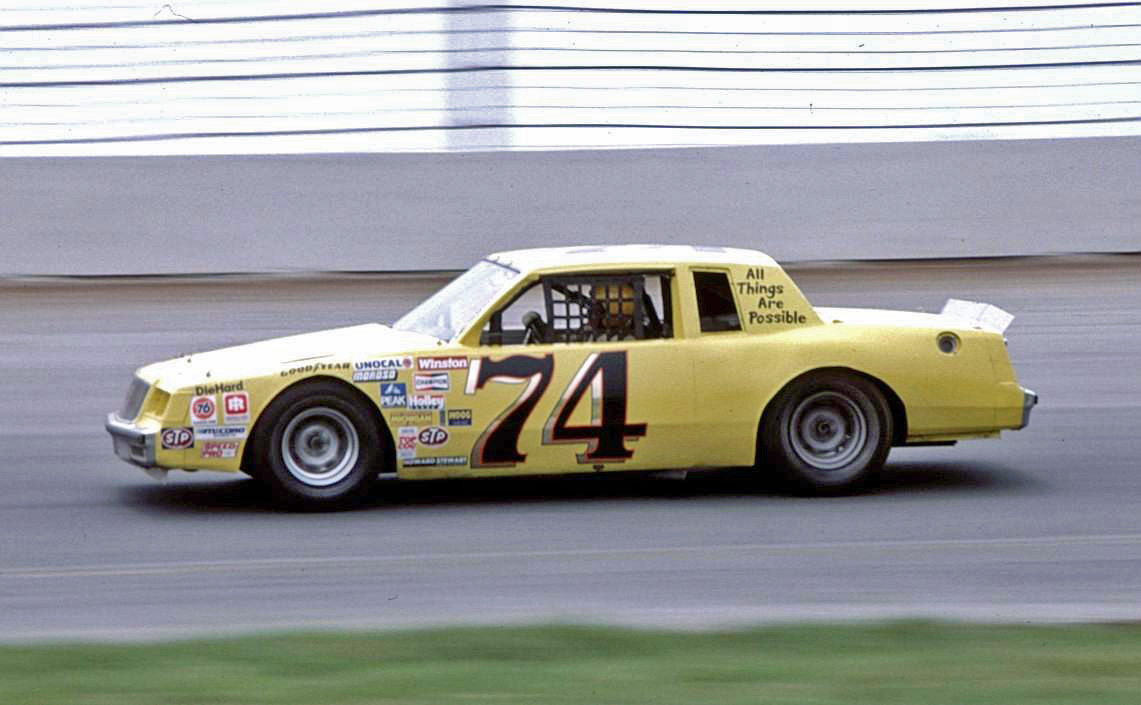
- Wawak's No. 74 at Pocono Raceway in 1985
- Born: Robert Laurence Wawak; September 4, 1939; Villa Park, Illinois, U.S.
- Died: April 17, 2004 (aged 64)

NASCAR Cup Series career
- 141 races run over 17 years
- Best finish: 22nd (1976)
- First race: 1965 Southern 500 (Darlington)
- Last race: 1987 AC Delco 500 (Rockingham)
Wins	Top tens	Poles
0	14	0
- Statistics up to date as of December 17, 2012.

Robert Laurence Wawak (September 4, 1939 – April 17, 2004) was an American NASCAR driver from Villa Park, Illinois. He made 141 Grand National/Winston Cup Series starts, with fourteen top-ten finishes.

== Racing career ==
=== Local racing ===
Wawak began drag racing as a teenager. He raced in his first stock car race at around 1958 at Mance Park Speedway in Hodgkins, Illinois. He raced regularly at the O'Hare Stadium in Schiller Park, Illinois. He competed in both the cadet (sportsman) and late model divisions.

In 1974, Wawak was the late model stock car champion at Illiana Motor Speedway in Schererville, Indiana. He competed at the track in 1973 and 1974, winning fourteen features at that half mile asphalt track in his 1971 Ford Torino. He won 21 total races (including preliminary events) in 1974.

=== National touring series ===
==== USAC ====
Wawak competed on the USAC stock car circuit in 1965. He made six races with a sixth-place finish in one event during his rookie season. He finished eighteenth in the final USAC standings that year. Wawak did not return to USAC racing until 1969 and would compete on a limited basis into the early 1970s.

==== NASCAR ====
Wawak made occasional NASCAR starts before 1976. His first start was in the 1965 Southern 500 at Darlington Speedway. He started 27th, and finished 36th with engine problems. Wawak made fourteen NASCAR starts in 1967.

Wawak most successful year was 1976, when he finished 22nd in the points. His highest career finish was a sixth-place finish in the final race of the season at Ontario.

The fuel line on Wawak's car came loose on the third lap of the 1977 Daytona 500, and the fire came into the car's cockpit. Wawak jumped from the car while it was still moving (and slammed into the inside wall moments later), held up his burnt hands, and ran to the infield care center. "It was like sitting in front of a blow torch," Wawak said later. He made six more starts that year.

Wawak continued racing in NASCAR, and made 96 more NASCAR starts. His career ended when he crashed in the first qualifier for the 1988 Daytona 500, Wawak suffering a fractured vertebra and detached retinas. Randy LaJoie raced in one race in his car in 1988, and Mike Potter raced three races in 1990.

After his NASCAR career ended, Wawak helped Hendrick Motorsports with their show cars.

== In media ==
Wawak appeared in NASCAR Thunder 2004 as an unlockable driver in a car numbered 36.

== Death ==
Wawak died at the age of 64, on April 17, 2004. He was survived by his wife Stevi and his two daughters.

== Motorsports career results ==
=== NASCAR ===
(key) (Bold – Pole position awarded by qualifying time. Italics – Pole position earned by points standings or practice time. * – Most laps led.)

==== Grand National Series ====
NASCAR Grand National Series results
Year	Team	No.	Make	1	2	3	4	5	6	7	8	9	10	11	12	13	14	15	16	17	18	19	20	21	22	23	24	25	26	27	28	29	30	31	32	33	34	35	36	37	38	39	40	41	42	43	44	45	46	47	48	49	50	51	52	53	54	55	NGNC	Pts	Ref
1965	Wawak Racing	4	Mercury	RSD	DAY	DAY	DAY	PIF	AWS	RCH	HBO	ATL	GPS	NWS	MAR	CLB	BRI	DAR	LGY	BGS	HCY	CLT	CCF	ASH	HAR	NSV	BIR	ATL	GPS	MBS	VAL	DAY	ODS	OBS	ISP	GLN	BRI	NSV	CCF	AWS	SMR	PIF	AUG	CLB	DTS	BLV	BGS	DAR; 36	HCY	LIN	ODS	RCH	MAR	NWS	CLT	HBO	CAR	DTS	117th	116	
1967	Wawak Racing	92	Plymouth	AUG	RSD	DAY	DAY	DAY	AWS	BRI	GPS	BGS	ATL	CLB	HCY	NWS	MAR	SVH	RCH	DAR	BLV	LGY	CLT; 13	ASH	MGR	SMR	BIR	CAR; 25	GPS	MGY	DAY; 24		OXF; 10	FDA; 27	ISP; 22	BRI			ATL; 10	BGS	CLB	SVH	DAR	HCY	RCH	BLV	HBO	MAR; 31	NWS; 30	CLT; 7	CAR; 43	AWS							31st	9078	
1967	Wawak Racing	92	Dodge																													TRN; 17					SMR; 23	NSV; 21																					31st	9078	
1968	Wawak Racing	77	Plymouth	MGR	MGY	RSD; DNQ	DAY	BRI	RCH	ATL	HCY	GPS	CLB	NWS	MAR	AUG	AWS	DAR	BLV	LGY	CLT	ASH	MGR	SMR	BIR	CAR	GPS	DAY	ISP	OXF	FDA	TRN	BRI	SMR	NSV	ATL	CLB	BGS	AWS	SBO	LGY	DAR	HCY	RCH	BLV	HBO	MAR	NWS	AUG	CLT	CAR	JFC							NA	-	
1969	Wawak Racing	73	Dodge	MGR	MGY	RSD	DAY	DAY	DAY	CAR	AUG	BRI	ATL	CLB	HCY	GPS	RCH	NWS	MAR	AWS	DAR	BLV	LGY	CLT	MGR	SMR	MCH; 31	KPT	GPS	NCF	DAY	DOV	TPN	TRN	BLV	BRI	NSV	SMR	ATL	MCH	SBO	BGS	AWS	DAR	HCY	RCH	TAL	CLB	MAR	NWS	CLT	SVH	AUG	CAR	JFC	MGR	TWS		80th	60	
1971	Wawak Racing	75	Dodge	RSD	DAY	DAY	DAY	ONT; 20	RCH	CAR; 19	HCY	BRI	ATL	CLB	GPS	SMR	NWS	MAR	DAR	SBO	TAL	ASH	KPT	CLT	DOV	MCH	RSD	HOU	GPS	DAY	BRI	AST	ISP	TRN	NSV	ATL	BGS	ONA	MCH	TAL; DNQ	CLB	HCY	DAR	MAR	CLT	DOV	CAR	MGR	RCH	NWS	TWS								76th	93	

==== Winston Cup Series ====
NASCAR Winston Cup Series results
Year	Team	No.	Make	1	2	3	4	5	6	7	8	9	10	11	12	13	14	15	16	17	18	19	20	21	22	23	24	25	26	27	28	29	30	31	NWCC	Pts	Ref
1976	Gwinn-Wawak	36	Chevy	RSD	DAY	CAR	RCH	BRI	ATL; DNQ	NWS	DAR	MAR	TAL; 29	NSV	DOV; 26			MCH; 26	DAY; 14	NSV; 10	POC; 14	TAL; 24	MCH; 10	BRI; 9	DAR; 10	RCH; 10	DOV; 22	MAR; 25	NWS; 8	CLT; 10	CAR; 33	ATL; 10	ONT; 6		22nd	2062	
1976	Gwinn-Wawak	26	Chevy													CLT; 26	RSD																		22nd	2062	
1977	Gwinn-Wawak	36	Chevy	RSD; 18	DAY; DNQ	RCH	CAR	ATL	NWS	DAR	BRI	MAR; 30	TAL	NSV	DOV	CLT	RSD																		45th	522	
1977	Gwinn-Wawak	32	Chevy		DAY; 42																														45th	522	
1977	Wawak Racing	74	Chevy															MCH; 18	DAY	NSV	POC	TAL	MCH; 15	BRI							CAR; 11	ATL; 29	ONT		45th	522	
1977	Gray Racing	19	Chevy																						DAR; 22	RCH	DOV	MAR	NWS	CLT					45th	522	
1978	Wawak Racing	74	Chevy	RSD	DAY; DNQ	RCH	CAR	ATL	BRI; 29	DAR	NWS	MAR; 12	TAL	DOV; 28	CLT; DNQ	NSV; 13	RSD	MCH	DAY	NSV				BRI; 28	DAR; 37	RCH	DOV	MAR	NWS	CLT			ONT; DNQ		38th	680	
1978	Greg Heller	85	Ford																		POC; 34	TAL	MCH												38th	680	
1978	Richard Childress Racing	31	Chevy																												CAR; 27	ATL			38th	680	
1979	Wawak Racing	74	Olds	RSD	DAY; 21	CAR	RCH	ATL	NWS																										46th	376	
1979	Wawak Racing	74	Chevy							BRI; 29	DAR; 28	MAR	TAL	NSV; 14	DOV	CLT	TWS	RSD	MCH	DAY	NSV	POC	TAL	MCH	BRI	DAR	RCH	DOV	MAR	CLT	NWS	CAR	ATL	ONT	46th	376	
1980	Wawak Racing	74	Chevy	RSD	DAY	RCH; 10	CAR; 17	ATL	BRI; 31	DAR; 13	NWS; 16	MAR; 31		NSV; 18	DOV; 29												RCH; 27	DOV	NWS; 11	MAR	CLT	CAR	ATL	ONT	25th	1742	
1980	Wawak Racing	74	Dodge										TAL; 30																						25th	1742	
1980	Wawak Racing	74	Buick													CLT; 25	TWS; 24	RSD; 22	MCH; 29	DAY	NSV; 23	POC	TAL; 24	MCH; 33	BRI	DAR; 39									25th	1742	
1981	Wawak Racing	94	Buick	RSD	DAY; DNQ	RCH	CAR; 14			NWS; 30	DAR; 24	MAR; 19	TAL; 10	NSV; 18	DOV	CLT; 31	TWS; 26	RSD	MCH; 33	DAY	NSV	POC	TAL; 19	MCH; 31	BRI	DAR; 24	RCH	DOV	MAR	NWS	CLT; 36	CAR	ATL; DNQ	RSD	31st	1212	
1981	Wawak Racing	94	Pontiac					ATL; 42	BRI																										31st	1212	
1982	Wawak Racing	94	Buick	DAY; 32	RCH	BRI; DNQ	ATL	CAR; 28							CLT; 20	POC; 14	RSD	MCH	DAY	NSV	POC; 19	TAL; 26	MCH	BRI					CLT; DNQ	MAR	CAR; 13				31st	1002	
1982	Wawak Racing	94	Chevy						DAR; 21	NWS	MAR	TAL	NSV	DOV											DAR; 21	RCH	DOV	NWS				ATL; 17	RSD		31st	1002	
1983	Wawak Racing	94	Buick	DAY; DNQ																															36th	825	
1983	Wawak Racing	74	Buick		RCH; DNQ	CAR; 16	ATL; 18	DAR; 16	NWS; DNQ	MAR	TAL; DNQ	NSV	DOV	BRI				MCH; 37			POC; 27		MCH; DNQ	BRI; DNQ											36th	825	
1983	Wawak Racing	74	Chevy												CLT; 18	RSD	POC		DAY; 27	NSV		TAL; 34			DAR; 21	RCH	DOV	MAR	NWS	CLT	CAR	ATL	RSD		36th	825	
1984	Wawak Racing	74	Chevy	DAY; DNQ	RCH	CAR	ATL	BRI	NWS	DAR	MAR	TAL	NSV	DOV	CLT	RSD																			47th	307	
1984	Jimmy Means Racing	52	Pontiac														POC; 28																		47th	307	
1984	Wawak Racing	74	Buick															MCH; DNQ	DAY	NSV	POC; 32	TAL	MCH	BRI	DAR	RCH	DOV	MAR	CLT; 22	NWS	CAR; 28	ATL	RSD		47th	307	
1985	Wawak Racing	74	Chevy	DAY; 13	RCH		ATL; DNQ	BRI	DAR; 34	NWS	MAR	TAL; 32	DOV	CLT	RSD	POC; 23		DAY; 37																	32nd	1226	
1985	Wawak Racing	74	Buick			CAR; 27											MCH; 27		POC; 25		MCH; 27	BRI; DNQ	DAR	RCH	DOV; 17	MAR; 16	NWS; 20	CLT	CAR; 34	ATL	RSD				32nd	1226	
1985	Gray Racing	54	Chevy																	TAL; 21															32nd	1226	
1986	Wawak Racing	74	Chevy	DAY; DNQ	RCH	CAR; 38	ATL; 23	BRI						CLT; DNQ	RSD	POC	MCH; 24	DAY	POC	TAL	GLN	MCH	BRI	DAR	RCH	DOV; 33	MAR	NWS	CLT; DNQ	CAR; 29	ATL	RSD			43rd	480	
1986	Wawak Racing	74	Buick						DAR; 19	NWS	MAR	TAL	DOV																						43rd	480	
1987	Wawak Racing	74	Chevy	DAY; DNQ	CAR; 27	RCH; 32	ATL; DNQ						CLT; 19	DOV	POC; 24	RSD	MCH; DNQ	DAY; DNQ	POC	TAL	GLN	MCH; 32	BRI	DAR; 23	RCH	DOV	MAR	NWS	CLT; DNQ	CAR; 36	RSD	ATL			39th	638	
1987	Wawak Racing	77	Chevy					DAR; 29	NWS	BRI	MAR	TAL																							39th	638	
1988	Wawak Racing	57	Chevy	DAY; DNQ	RCH	CAR	ATL	DAR	BRI	NWS	MAR	TAL	CLT	DOV	RSD	POC	MCH	DAY	POC	TAL	GLN	MCH	BRI	DAR	RCH	DOV	MAR	CLT	NWS	CAR	PHO	ATL			NA	-	

===== Daytona 500 =====
Year	Team	Manufacturer	Start	Finish
1977	Gwinn-Wawak	Chevrolet	DNQ	
1977	Gwinn-Wawak	Chevrolet	17	42
1978	Wawak Racing	Chevrolet	DNQ	
1979	Wawak Racing	Olds	30	21
1981	Wawak Racing	Buick	DNQ	
1982	Wawak Racing	Buick	28	32
1983	Wawak Racing	Buick	DNQ	
1984	Wawak Racing	Chevrolet	DNQ	
1985	Wawak Racing	Chevrolet	26	13
1986	Wawak Racing	Chevrolet	DNQ	
1987	Wawak Racing	Chevrolet	DNQ	
1988	Wawak Racing	Chevrolet	DNQ	

=== ARCA Permatex SuperCar Series ===
(key) (Bold – Pole position awarded by qualifying time. Italics – Pole position earned by points standings or practice time. * – Most laps led.)

ARCA Permatex SuperCar Series results
Year	Team	No.	Make	1	2	3	4	5	6	7	8	9	10	11	12	13	14	15	16	17	18	19	20	APSC	Pts	Ref
1981		94	Olds	DAY; 16	DSP	FRS	FRS	BFS	TAL	FRS	COR													NA	0	
1983	Wawak Racing	74	Buick	DAY	NSV	TAL; 17	LPR	LPR	ISF	IRP	SSP	FRS	BFS	WIN	LPR	POC	TAL	MCS	FRS	MIL	DSF	ZAN	SND	NA	0	
1986	Churchill Motorsports	11	Chevy	ATL	DAY	ATL	TAL	SIR	SSP	FRS	KIL	CSP	TAL	BLN	ISF	DSF	TOL	MCS	ATL; 22					119th	-	
1987	Wawak Racing	77	Chevy	DAY	ATL	TAL; 4	DEL	ACS	TOL	ROC	POC	FRS	KIL											60th	-	
1987	Wawak Racing	74	Chevy											TAL; 29	FRS	ISF	INF	DSF	SLM					60th	-	
1987	Bryan Waters	77	Chevy																	ATL; 3				60th	-	
1988	Wawak Racing	74	Chevy	DAY; 22	ATL	TAL; DNQ	FRS	PCS	ROC	POC	WIN	KIL	ACS	SLM	POC	TAL	DEL	FRS	ISF	DSF	SLM	ATL		132nd	-	
