= Ranier Racing with MDM =

Former NASCAR team

- Owner(s): Lorin Ranier; Mike Hillman; Doug Fuller
- Base: Mooresville, North Carolina
- Series: Camping World Truck Series; K&N Pro Series East; ARCA Racing Series
- Race drivers: K&N Pro Series East: 12. Harrison Burton; 40. Kyle Benjamin; 41. Spencer Davis; ARCA Racing Series: 28. Michael Self
- Manufacturer: Chevrolet
- Opened: 1967
- Closed: 2016

Career
- Race victories: Total: 30; Monster Energy NASCAR Cup Series: 24; Xfinity Series: 0 Camping World Truck Series: 0 ARCA Racing Series: 1 K&N Pro Series East: 5

Ranier Racing with MDM, formerly known as Ranier-Lundy, was an American professional stock car racing team that last competed in the NASCAR Camping World Truck Series, the K&N Pro Series East, and the ARCA Racing Series. The team formerly competed in the NASCAR Winston Cup Series until 1987, fielding Cale Yarborough during the 1980s late in its operations. The team later became Robert Yates Racing after Yates, an engine builder and crew chief with the operation, bought the team in 1988. The team largely fielded General Motors vehicles for its various drivers until switching to Fords in 1985.

The team won the Daytona 500 three times, in 1980 with Buddy Baker and in 1983 and 1984 with Yarborough.

The team was based in Charlotte and co-operated by Harry Ranier (February 25, 1937 – July 21, 1999) and J. T. Lundy (January 3, 1941 – December 27, 2023), who left in 1987. Ranier was a Kentuckian coal mining magnate. Ranier's entry into the sport predates magnates such as J. D. Stacy and Billy Hagan.

== Cup Series ==
=== Car No. 28 history ===
==== 1967–1980 ====
Harry Ranier started entering racecars into NASCAR's top division sporadically starting in 1967 and consistently starting in 1978 with driver Lennie Pond and later Buddy Baker.

In 1978, Ranier's team won its first race at the Talladega 500 with Pond after other key leading cars were slowed when Bill Elliott's car blew a tire and spreading debris.

Buddy Baker drove for the team starting in 1979. In 1980, Waddell Wilson was crew chief and engine builder. Baker won the 1980 Daytona 500 for the team in a famous paint scheme known as the "gray ghost". The car set the record for fastest Daytona 500 ever run by average speed, a record that still stands.

==== 1983–1988 ====
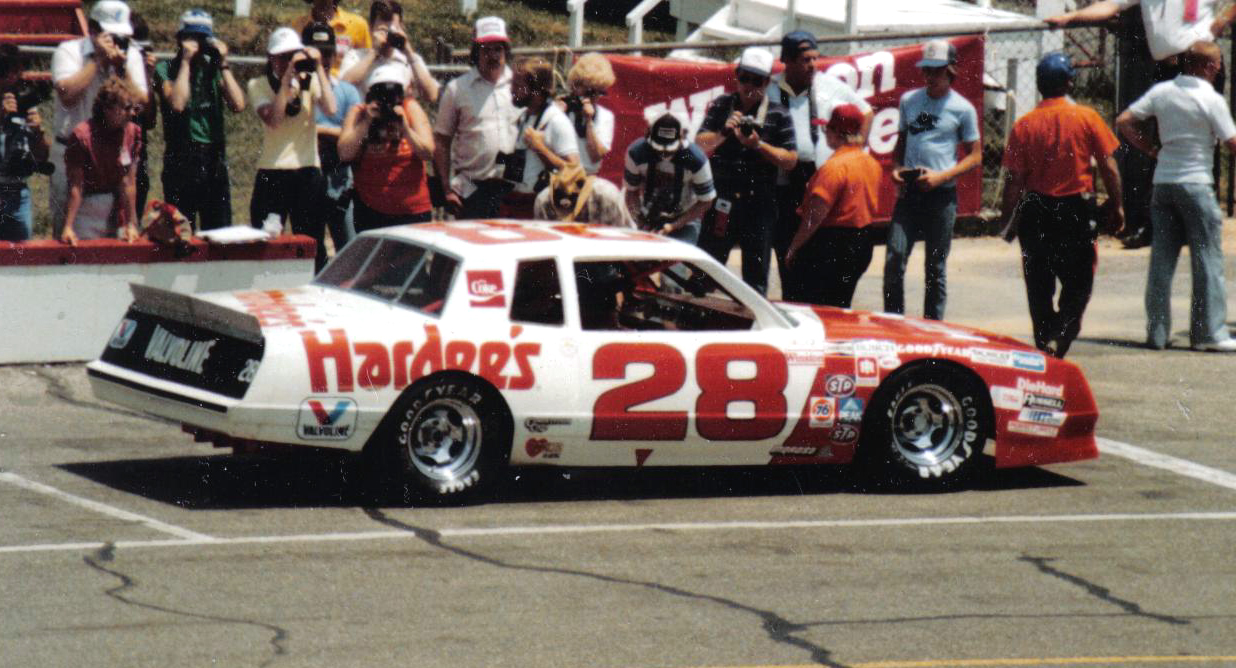
1983 car, driven by Cale Yarborough.

In 1983, Yarborough moved to the No. 28 Hardee's Chevrolet owned by Harry Ranier, competing in 16 events. He won four races, including his third Daytona 500, his sixth Atlanta Coca-Cola 500, and swept both events at Michigan, along with three poles. In 1984 he repeated by winning his fourth Daytona 500, becoming the second driver to score back-to-back wins, the Winston 500 at Talladega, a race that featured 75 lead changes, and the Van Scoy Diamond Mine 500, along with four poles. In 1985 after his team switched to a Ford, he won his first Talladega 500 and scored his final win in the Miller High Life 500 at Charlotte Motor Speedway.

==== 1987–1988 ====
Prior to the 1987 season, car owner Ranier tapped Davey Allison to replace veteran driver Cale Yarborough in the Ranier-Lundy No. 28 Ford Thunderbird. Yarborough was leaving the Ranier-Lundy team to start his own operation along with the team's sponsor, Hardee's. Ranier negotiated a sponsorship deal with Texaco's Havoline motor oil brand, a deal that was signed during the Speedweeks at Daytona International Speedway. He also hired Robert Yates as his engine builder and Joey Knuckles as the No. 28's crew chief, who paired with Allison for years.

On qualifying day, Allison signalled that he was in Winston Cup to stay when he qualified an unmarked, but Texaco-Havoline painted No. 28 Thunderbird second for the 1987 Daytona 500, becoming the first rookie ever to start on the front row for NASCAR's most prestigious event. A pit miscue which allowed a rear tire to fall off on the track ended his hopes of a good finish in the race, but success for Davey Allison would be just around the corner.

Allison drove full time in the Texaco/Havoline #28 for Ranier in 1987 and 1988. Ranier sold his team to Yates on October 1, 1988, prior to the 1989 season. Allison would have most of his success driving for Yates Racing. Ranier did not field a car again until the fall of 1996.

==== Car No. 28 results ====
NASCAR Winston Cup Series results
Year	Driver	No.	Make	1	2	3	4	5	6	7	8	9	10	11	12	13	14	15	16	17	18	19	20	21	22	23	24	25	26	27	28	29	30	31	NWCC	Pts	Ref
1973	Lennie Pond	54	Chevy	RSD	DAY; DNQ	RCH; 7	CAR; 20	BRI; 6	ATL	NWS; 7	DAR; 36	MAR; 19	TAL; 46	NSV	CLT; 38	DOV; 20	TWS; 24	RSD	MCH; 37	DAY; 20	BRI; 4	ATL; 6	TAL; 47	NSV; 23	DAR; 37	RCH; 28	DOV; 9	NWS; 6	MAR; 30	CLT; 6	CAR; 9				23rd	4013.85	
1974	Lennie Pond	54	Chevy	RSD	DAY; 23	RCH; 4	CAR; 9	BRI; 26	ATL; 10	DAR; 21	NWS; 5	MAR; 5	TAL; 5	NSV; 11	DOV; 6	CLT; 20	RSD	MCH; 26	DAY; 7	BRI	NSV	ATL; 5	POC; 30	TAL	MCH	DAR; 13	RCH; 10	DOV; 32	NWS	MAR; 12	CLT; 6	CAR; 11	ONT		18th	723.25	
1975	Lennie Pond	54	Chevy	RSD	DAY; 19	RCH; 2	CAR; 23	BRI	ATL; 10	NWS; 5	DAR; 27	MAR; 25	TAL; 26	NSV	DOV; 33	CLT; 36	RSD	MCH	DAY; 38	NSV	POC	TAL; 32	MCH	DAR; 21	DOV; 20	NWS; 5	MAR; 24	CLT; 22	RCH; 2*	CAR; 4	BRI; 2	ATL; 6	ONT; 6		21st	2540	
1976	Lennie Pond	54	Chevy	RSD; 6	DAY; 4	CAR; 30	RCH; 23	BRI; 22	ATL; 4	NWS; 6	DAR; 4	MAR; 22	TAL; 11	NSV; 6	DOV; 8	CLT; 8	RSD; 25	MCH; 7	DAY; 32	NSV; 4	POC; 5	TAL; 5	MCH; 25	BRI; 8	DAR; 5	RCH; 6	DOV; 34	MAR; 29	NWS; 5	CLT; 7	CAR; 2	ATL; 24	ONT; 2		5th	3930	
1977	Lennie Pond	54	Chevy	RSD	DAY	RCH	CAR; 34	ATL; 9	NWS	DAR; 31	BRI	MAR; 4	TAL	NSV	DOV; 7	CLT; 4	RSD	MCH	DAY; 33	NSV	POC	TAL; 5	MCH	BRI	DAR; 28	RCH; 5	DOV; 30	MAR; 25	NWS	CLT; 30	CAR; 36	ATL	ONT		30th	1193	
1978	Lennie Pond	54	Chevy	RSD; DNQ		RCH; 2*	CAR; 5	ATL; 5	BRI; 5		NWS; 4	MAR; 18	TAL; 21	DOV; 3		NSV; 2	RSD; 7		DAY; 5	NSV; 26	POC				DAR; 26	RCH; 12		MAR; 5	NWS; 7	CLT; 6	CAR; 7	ATL; 39	ONT; 6		7th	3794	
1978	Lennie Pond	54	Olds		DAY; 10					DAR; 3					CLT; 33			MCH; 25				TAL; 1	MCH; 8	BRI; 26			DOV; 7								7th	3794	
1979	Buddy Baker	28	Chevy	RSD; 7		CAR; 31	RCH; 29		NWS; 8	BRI; 25	DAR; 5	MAR; 2		NSV; 8	DOV; 3	CLT; 36	TWS; 3	RSD	MCH; 1*			POC; 3		MCH; 2*	BRI	DAR; 4	RCH	DOV; 4	MAR; 1*	CLT; 25	NWS	CAR; 33	ATL; 39	ONT; 4	15th	3249	
1979	Buddy Baker	28	Olds		DAY; 40			ATL; 1					TAL; 32							DAY; 34	NSV		TAL; 39												15th	3249	
1980	Buddy Baker	28	Olds	RSD	DAY; 1*	RCH		ATL; 7	BRI				TAL; 1*	NSV						DAY; 4	NSV		TAL; 32*												21st	2603	
1980	Buddy Baker	28	Chevy				CAR; 15			DAR; 35	NWS	MAR; 24			DOV; 3				MCH; 3					MCH; 6	BRI	DAR; 26	RCH	DOV; 3	NWS	MAR; 2		CAR; 27			21st	2603	
1980	Buddy Baker	28	Buick													CLT; 39	TWS	RSD				POC; 2									CLT; 3		ATL; 4	ONT	21st	2603	
1981	Bobby Allison	28	Chevy	RSD; 1*		RCH; 23																				DAR; 9					CLT; 2				2nd	4827	
1981	Bobby Allison	28	Pontiac		DAY; 2*		CAR; 6	ATL; 4	BRI; 3	NWS; 2*		MAR; 13		NSV; 3																					2nd	4827	
1981	Bobby Allison	28	Buick								DAR; 9		TAL; 1		DOV; 2	CLT; 1*	TWS; 3	RSD; 29	MCH; 1	DAY; 28	NSV; 2	POC; 25	TAL; 5*	MCH; 7	BRI; 4		RCH; 5	DOV; 3	MAR; 10	NWS; 2		CAR; 2	ATL; 4	RSD; 1*	2nd	4827	
1982	Benny Parsons	28	Pontiac	DAY; 26	RCH; 3*	BRI; 9	ATL; 4	CAR; 3	DAR; 4	NWS; 4	MAR; 29	TAL; 3*	NSV; 22	DOV; 20	CLT; 39	POC; 3	RSD; 23																		8th	3616	
1982	Buddy Baker	28	Pontiac															MCH; 31	DAY; 8	NSV; 24	POC; 5	TAL; 2	MCH; 25	BRI; 9	DAR; 5	RCH; 9	DOV; 29	NWS; 24	CLT; 6	MAR; 6	CAR; 7	ATL; 21			8th	3616	
1982	Joe Ruttman	28	Pontiac																														RSD; 40		8th	3616	
1983	Cale Yarborough	28	Pontiac	DAY; 1	RCH																														28th	1960	
1983	Cale Yarborough	28	Chevy			CAR; 9*	ATL; 1	DAR; 6	NWS	MAR	TAL; 29	NSV	DOV; 22	BRI	CLT; 28	RSD	POC; 27	MCH; 1	DAY; 40	NSV	POC	TAL; 24	MCH; 1*	BRI	DAR; 7	RCH	DOV	MAR	NWS	CLT; 10	CAR; 36	ATL; 23	RSD		28th	1960	
1984	Cale Yarborough	28	Chevy	DAY; 1*	RCH; 14	CAR	ATL; 3	BRI	NWS	DAR; 4	MAR	TAL; 1	NSV	DOV	CLT; 21	RSD	POC; 1*	MCH; 13*	DAY; 3*	NSV	POC; 2	TAL; 5	MCH; 5	BRI	DAR; 17	RCH; 14	DOV	MAR	CLT; 3	NWS	CAR	ATL; 11	RSD		22nd	2448	
1985	Cale Yarborough	28	Ford	DAY; 36	RCH	CAR; 7	ATL; 22	BRI	DAR; 30	NWS	MAR	TAL; 3*	DOV	CLT; 40	RSD	POC; 24	MCH; 3	DAY; 36	POC; 31	TAL; 1	MCH; 32	BRI	DAR; 2	RCH	DOV	MAR	NWS	CLT; 1	CAR; 28*	ATL; 2	RSD				26th	1861	
1986	Cale Yarborough	28	Ford	DAY; 27	RCH	CAR; 6	ATL; 27	BRI	DAR; 22	NWS	MAR	TAL; 37	DOV	CLT; 3*	RSD	POC; 3	MCH; 30	DAY; 17	POC; 25	TAL; 24	GLN	MCH; 7	BRI	DAR; 10	RCH	DOV	MAR	NWS	CLT; 36	CAR; 33	ATL; 34	RSD			29th	1642	
1987	Davey Allison	28	Ford	DAY; 27	CAR; 9	RCH; 26	ATL; 5	DAR; 27	NWS	BRI	MAR	TAL; 1*	CLT; 16	DOV; 1*	POC; 12	RSD	MCH; 2	DAY; 20	POC; 5	TAL; 2*	GLN; 17	MCH; 5	BRI	DAR; 29	RCH	DOV; 2	MAR	NWS; 26	CLT; 19	CAR; 42	RSD; 14	ATL; 5			21st	2824	
1988	Davey Allison	28	Ford	DAY; 2	RCH; 29	CAR; 9	ATL; 40	DAR; 3	BRI; 29	NWS; 8	MAR; 6	TAL; 34	CLT; 5	DOV; 5	RSD; 32	POC; 5	MCH; 35	DAY; 38	POC; 3	TAL; 39	GLN; 16	MCH; 1	BRI; 4	DAR; 9	RCH; 1*	DOV; 4	MAR; 18	CLT; 19	NWS; 11	CAR; 27	PHO; 3	ATL; 2			8th	3631	

=== Car No. 20 history ===
After staying out of the Cup Series for eight years, Ranier fielded a Cup entry with Elton Sawyer driving the new #20 in the 1996 season finale at the Atlanta Motor Speedway. Rainer back moved to Cup full time in 1997 with former partner Hardee's returning to sponsor the new #20 and Greg Sacks driving the car. However, after missing several early-season races, the team switched to part time, and eventually Hardee's left the team and it shut down.

==== Car No. 20 results ====
NASCAR Winston Cup Series results
Year	Driver	No.	Make	1	2	3	4	5	6	7	8	9	10	11	12	13	14	15	16	17	18	19	20	21	22	23	24	25	26	27	28	29	30	31	32	NWCC	Pts
1996	Elton Sawyer	20	Ford	DAY	CAR	RCH	ATL	DAR	BRI	NWS	MAR	TAL	SON	CLT	DOV	POC	MCH	DAY	NHA	POC	TAL	IND	GLN	MCH	BRI	DAR	RCH	DOV	MAR	NWS	CLT	CAR	PHO	ATL; 23			
1997	Greg Sacks	20	Ford	DAY; 37	CAR; 39	RCH; DNQ	ATL; 27	DAR; 29	TEX; 40	BRI; DNQ			TAL; 25	CLT	DOV	POC	MCH	CAL	DAY	NHA	POC	IND	GLN	MCH	BRI	DAR	RCH	NHA	DOV	MAR	CLT	TAL	CAR	PHO	ATL		
1997	Lance Hooper	20	Ford								MAR; DNQ	SON; 42																									

== Busch Series ==
=== Car No. 15 history ===
Ranier returned to run a limited schedule in the 1996 Busch Series with IRL star Tony Stewart driving the No. 15. The team had sponsorship from Mariah Entertainment for the first two events of a nine race schedule, running the rest unsponsored. Stewart had a best finish of 16th at Bristol. The Ranier Busch Series team shut down after the season.

==== Car No. 15 results ====
NASCAR Busch Series results
Year	Driver	No.	Make	1	2	3	4	5	6	7	8	9	10	11	12	13	14	15	16	17	18	19	20	21	22	23	24	25	26	NBGNC	Pts
1996	Tony Stewart	15	Pontiac	DAY; 21	CAR; DNQ	RCH	ATL; 39	NSV	DAR	BRI; 16	HCY	NZH	CLT	DOV; 17	SBO	MYB; DNQ	GLN	MLW; 22	NHA	TAL; 26	IRP; DNQ	MCH	BRI; 37	DAR; 20	RCH; 40	DOV					
1996	Toby Porter	15	Chevy																								CLT; DNQ	CAR	HOM; DNQ		

== Truck Series ==
For the operations after the 2016 season, see MDM Motorsports

=== Truck No. 71 history ===
On February 4, 2016, MDM-Hillman Racing joined Lorin Ranier to create a driver development team that would compete in, among other series, the Camping World Truck Series. A selection of Richard Childress Racing development drivers were scheduled to run a partial season in the No. 99 Chevrolet, with funding from the drivers' other sponsors. After rain cancelled qualifying at Dover, the team made a deal to run Dover and the rest of Ranier/MDM's 2016 schedule in the No. 71 Chevrolet, leasing owners points from Carlos Contreras. Brandon Jones and Austin Dillon split the Truck for six races.

=== Truck No. 99 history ===
Ranier Racing/MDM was supposed to field the No. 99 in six Truck races in 2016, however the truck was renumbered to No. 71 after leasing owners points from Contreras Motorsports.

In 2017, the No. 99 truck returned but since Ranier and Miller parted ways the team starting in 2017 and beyond is called MDM Motorsports.

== K&N Pro Series / ARCA Racing Series ==
In 2015, Ranier Racing with MDM partner with Hillman Racing to field two cars (No. 40 and No. 41) in both K&N Pro Series East and K&N Pro Series West.

The team returned for 2016.

In 2017, the team shut down because Ranier/Hillman and Miller part ways. Miller renamed the team to MDM Motorsports.

Austin Dillon, Landon Cassill, Ryan Preece, Kyle Benjamin, Travis Miller, Brian Wong, Corey LaJoie and Spencer Davis all drove for the team in K&N.

The team also fielded two part-time entries (the No. 8 and No. 28) in ARCA Racing Series' 2016 season, the team had 1 win with Brandon Jones at Michigan. The team also had 1 pole-position with Kyle Benjamin at Iowa.

Alongside Jones and Benjamin, Harrison Burton, Travis Miller, Matt Tifft and Michael Self also drove for the team in ARCA.
