= Ralph Moody (racing driver) =

American racing driver (1917–2004)

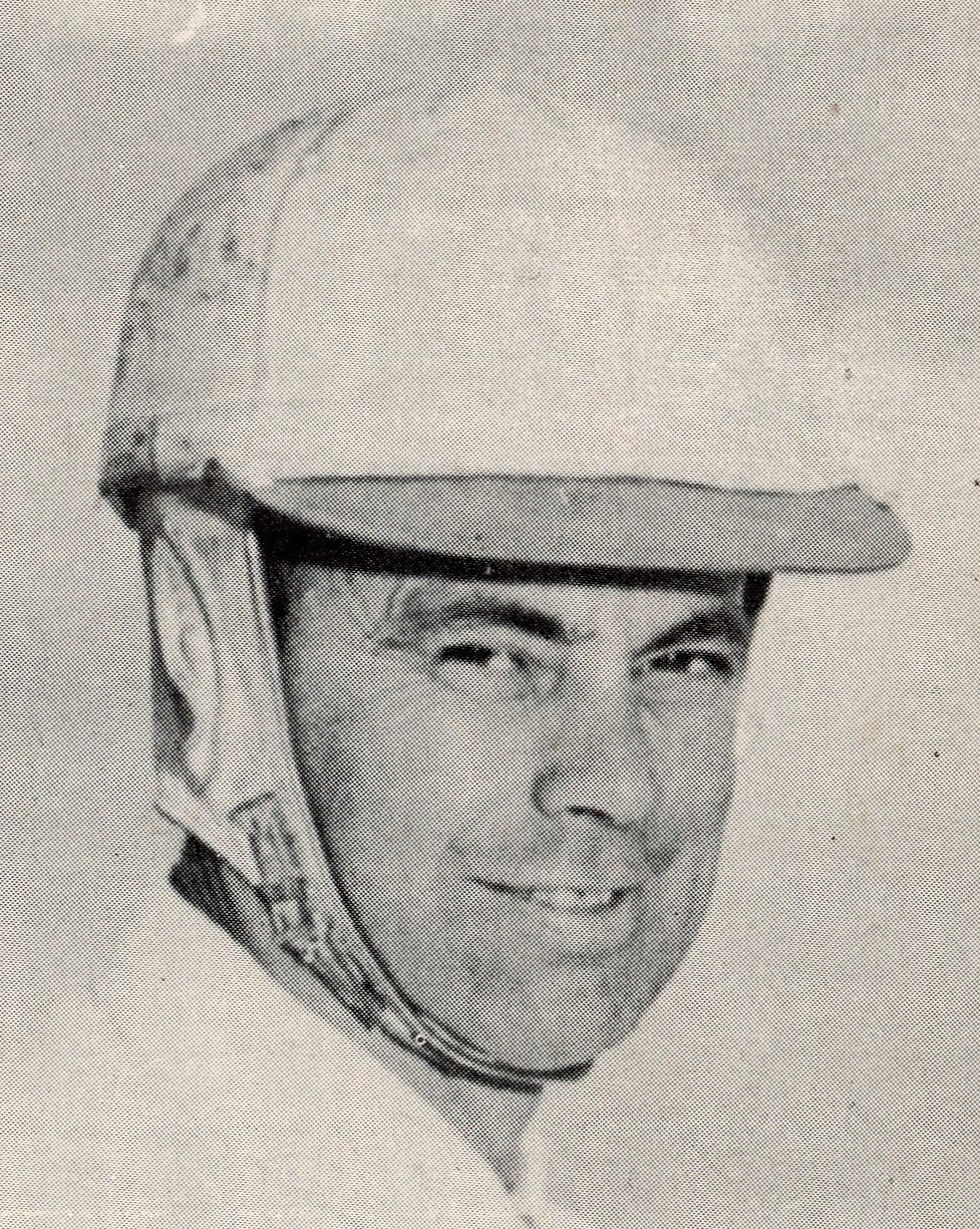
- Moody, circa 1957
- Born: Ralph Alphonso Moody Jr. September 10, 1917 Dighton, Massachusetts, U.S.
- Died: June 9, 2004 (aged 86) Mooresville, North Carolina, U.S.

NASCAR Cup Series career
- 47 races run over 4 years
- Best finish: 8th (1956)
- First race: 1956 Race 6 (Daytona Beach)
- Last race: 1962 Richmond 250 (Richmond)
- First win: 1956 Race 25 (LeHi)
- Last win: 1957 Race 6 (Wilson Speedway)
Wins	Top tens	Poles
5	27	5

Ralph Alphonso Moody Jr. (September 10, 1917 – June 9, 2004) was an American racing driver and team owner. After a brief career racing, including in NASCAR and USAC sanctioned stock car competition, he retired to become a team co-owner of Holman-Moody.

== Background ==
Moody built his first Model T Ford race car in 1935, and ran it on nights and weekends. He served in the U.S. Army in World War II, and drove a tank under the command of General George S. Patton. He married his wife Mitzi in 1949, and they moved to Florida so that he could race all year.

After the Second World War while still living in Massachusetts, Moody was an active midget chauffeur in the now-defunct Bay State Midget Racing Association.

== Stock car career ==
Moody won four NASCAR races in 1956 for owner Pete DePaolo, winner of the 1925 Indianapolis 500. Moody finished eighth in points, with 21 top-ten finishes in 35 races.

Moody raced the first third of 1957 until Ford and the other American automobile manufacturers pulled out of racing.

== Partnership with John Holman ==
Moody immediately took out a loan against an airplane he owned, and along with John Holman, paid $12,000 to buy the shop and equipment that had been Ford's Charlotte-based racing operation ().

Holman-Moody began as a racecar owner operation but became more famous for their racecar building operation. Holman-Moody chassis featured improvements such as tube shocks, square tubing frames, and rear ends with floater housings (). They built around 50 race cars a year until Moody sold his portion of the company after the 1971 season. They had won 92 NASCAR Grand National races.

== Ralph Moody, Inc. ==
Moody then opened Ralph Moody Inc. in Charlotte. He built race engines and race cars and did research and development of high mileage automobiles at that site for several years.

== List of Halls of Fame inductions ==
- NASCAR Hall of Fame in 2025
- North Carolina Auto Racing Hall of Fame in 2003
- National Motorsports Press Association Stock Car Racing Hall of Fame in 1990
- International Motorsports Hall of Fame in 1994
- Motorsports Hall of Fame of America in 2005
- New England Auto Racers Hall of Fame in 2000
- Drag Racing Hall of Fame
- Old Timers Hall of Fame
