= John Holman (NASCAR owner) =

American NASCAR owner (1918-1975)

John Holman (November 9, 1918 – December 28, 1975) was an American NASCAR owner. He is most famous for his co-ownership of the two-time NASCAR championship team Holman-Moody with Ralph Moody.

== Early career ==
Holman was born in Nashville, Tennessee and grew up in Wooster, Ohio. After the start of World War II, he began a career as a tool and die maker and as a shipyard worker. After the war, he became a trucker. He assembled a Mack truck between shipments. He was hired in 1952 by Clay Smith and Bill Stroppe to drive their parts truck to each leg of the 1952 Mexican Road Race, and to stay ahead of the racing team. The team won the race, and they hired Holman as a full-time mechanic and parts man after the race to work in their Long Beach, California shop. Smith was killed in a racing accident at DuQuoin, Illinois in 1954, and Stroppe took over. Holman continued to work for him until 1956. Holman was hired by Ford Motor Company to run their factory shop in Charlotte.

== Holman-Moody ==
Ralph Moody was the mechanic, manager, and star driver of the 1925 Indianapolis 500 winner Pete DePaolo's Ford factory-sponsored stock car racing facility in Charlotte, North Carolina. The drivers formed a partnership after the American Manufacturers' Association banned Ford's factory participation in stock car racing in June 1957. The move unemployed both men. They decided to pool their resources and formed Holman-Moody. The team became one of the winningest teams in NASCAR history after racking up 92 wins and two championships before Moody sold his interests to Holman.

Ironically, Holman-Moody invested in the Bill Stroppe organization in 1965, and the Long Beach facility at 2190 Temple Avenue became Holman-Moody-Stroppe.

Holman died of a heart attack in 1975 while testing a new intercooler.

== Career awards ==
- Motorsports Hall of Fame of America (2005)
