= 1981 Talladega 500 =

Auto race held at Alabama International Motor Speedway in 1981

Race details
- Race 20 of 31 in the 1981 NASCAR Winston Cup Series season
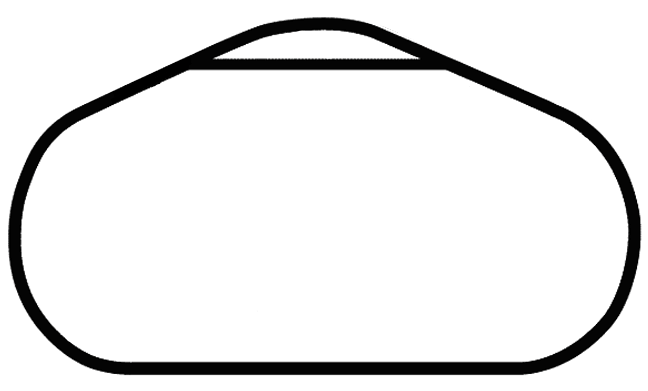
- Layout of Talladega Superspeedway
- Date: August 2, 1981
- Official name: Talladega 500
- Location: Alabama International Motor Speedway, Talladega, Alabama
- Course: Permanent racing facility
- Course length: 2.660 miles (4.280 km)
- Distance: 188 laps, 500.1 mi (804.8 km)
- Weather: 84 °F (29 °C); wind speeds of 9.9 miles per hour (15.9 km/h)
- Average speed: 156.737 miles per hour (252.244 km/h)
- Attendance: 75,000

Pole position
Driver	Harry Gant	Mach 1 Racing

Most laps led
Driver	Bobby Allison	Ranier Racing
- Laps: 105

Winner
No. 47	Ron Bouchard	Race Hill Farm Team

Television in the United States
- Network: CBS
- Announcers: Ken Squier; Ned Jarrett

The 1981 Talladega 500 was a NASCAR Winston Cup Series racing event that took place on August 2, 1981, at Alabama International Motor Speedway in Talladega, Alabama.

== Background ==
Talladega Superspeedway, originally known as Alabama International Motor Superspeedway (AIMS), is a motorsports complex located north of Talladega, Alabama. It is located on the former Anniston Air Force Base in the small city of Lincoln. The track is a Tri-oval and was constructed by International Speedway Corporation, a business controlled by the France Family, in the 1960s. Talladega is most known for its steep banking and the unique location of the start/finish line - located just past the exit to pit road. The track currently hosts the NASCAR series such as the Sprint Cup Series, Xfinity Series, and the Camping World Truck Series. Talladega Superspeedway is the longest NASCAR oval with a length of 2.66 miles (4.28 km), and the track at its peak had a seating capacity of 175,000 spectators.

== Race report ==
42 drivers would appear at this race; Joe Booher would receive credit for the last-place finish due to an engine issue on the fourth lap. It took more than three hours to resolve the 188 lap race. There were eight caution periods for 36 laps with 39 lead changes. Harry Gant would win the pole position with a speed of 195.897 miles per hour (315.266 km/h). Rick Wilson crashed at least four times in this race before finally finishing his Oldsmobile off on lap 148.

This race marked the end for an iconic sponsorship as the Wood Brothers' #21 Ford hit the track in its famous Purolator colors for the final time, ending a partnership that dated back to 1971. Neil Bonnett qualified well and led early before a mechanical gremlin put the #21 out. Morgan Shepherd and his crew chief Darrell Bryant and a few of his own crew members got into a fight before this race. That led to Shepherd being released and Joe Millikan being hired for the rest of the season. Shepherd would qualify for the race in 15th place. He would drop out of the race on lap 55 due to engine problems and finish 36th.

Darrell Waltrip, Terry Labonte, and Ron Bouchard were nose-to-tail going into the final lap. Coming through the trioval to the finish line, Labonte tried to pass Waltrip on the outside, Waltrip forcing him high, up against the wall. Bouchard, in third place, slipped by on the inside and won by 2 feet or 0.61 metres in a spectacular 3-wide photo finish in front of 75,000 spectators. It would be the only Cup victory of his career. The thrilling win would propel him to that year's NASCAR Rookie of the Year award. Bouchard and Pete Hamilton are the only NASCAR Cup Series winners from Massachusetts to date.

Terry Herman would make his first NASCAR Cup start in this race while Sandy Satullo, II would make his last. Stan Barrett would make the best finish of his career in this race; he would go on to father independent driver Stanton Barrett. Richard Childress would make one of his final driving appearances before becoming a full-time owner of Richard Childress Racing.

The finish of the race was shown on the CBS Evening News that night, due to the technical difficulties that happened during the final seven minutes of the race. CBS Sports commentator Ken Squier confirms that the problems were caused by a breakdown of its microwave transmitter owned by Southern Bell. Despite video loss, the audio of the race was immediately picked up by a backup audio line. Squier managed to call the photo finish while viewers were stuck with the CBS Sports Saturday logo on-screen, they aired the final lap the following week during CBS Sports Spectacular.

=== Qualifying ===
Grid	No.	Driver	Manufacturer	Owner
1	33	Harry Gant	Buick	Hal Needham
2	28	Bobby Allison	Buick	Harry Ranier
3	2	Dale Earnhardt	Pontiac	Jim Stacy
4	44	Terry Labonte	Buick	Bill Hagan
5	27	Cale Yarborough	Buick	M.C. Anderson
6	21	Neil Bonnett	Ford	Wood Brothers
7	1	Buddy Baker	Buick	Hoss Ellington
8	6	Joe Ruttman	Buick	Jim Stacy
9	62	Rick Wilson	Oldsmobile	Rick Wilson
10	47	Ron Bouchard	Buick	Jack Beebe

== Finishing order ==
1. Ron Bouchard†
2. Darrell Waltrip
3. Terry Labonte
4. Harry Gant
5. Bobby Allison
6. Lake Speed
7. Kyle Petty
8. Jody Ridley
9. Stan Barrett
10. Dave Marcis
11. Bill Elliott
12. Elliott Forbes-Robinson
13. Benny Parsons†
14. Terry Herman
15. Dick May†
16. Jimmy Means
17. Cecil Gordon†
18. Tommy Gale†
19. Bobby Wawak†
20. Rick Wilson*
21. Rusty Wallace*
22. Joe Ruttman*
23. Ricky Rudd
24. Lennie Pond*
25. Gary Balough*
26. Richard Childress*
27. Mike Potter*
28. Cale Yarborough*
29. Dale Earnhardt*†
30. Bruce Hill*
31. Sandy Satullo, II*
32. Buddy Baker*†
33. Connie Saylor*†
34. Tim Richmond*†
35. Mike Alexander*
36. Morgan Shepherd*
37. Neil Bonnett*†
38. Jack Ingram*
39. James Hylton*†
40. Richard Petty*
41. Buddy Arrington*
42. Joe Booher*

† signifies that the driver is known to be deceased
* Driver failed to finish race

== Standings after the race ==
Pos	Driver	Points	Differential
1	Bobby Allison	3029	0
2	Darrell Waltrip	2935	-94
3	Harry Gant	2782	-247
4	Ricky Rudd	2664	-365
5	Dale Earnhardt	2608	-421
6 ▲	Terry Labonte	2573	-456
7	Jody Ridley	2566	-463
8 ▼	Richard Petty	2562	-467
9	Benny Parsons	2417	-612
10 ▲	Kyle Petty	2272	-757

Preceded by 1981 Mountain Dew 500	NASCAR Winston Cup Series Season; 1981	Succeeded by 1981 Champion Spark Plug 400

Preceded by 1980	Talladega 500 races 1981	Succeeded by 1982
