= Bill Hollar =

American racing driver (1938–2012)

William Mack "Bill" Hollar, Sr.
- Born: September 6, 1938; Burlington, North Carolina, US
- Died: November 26, 2012 (aged 74); Alamance County, North Carolina, US

NASCAR Cup Series career
- 29 races run over 9 years
- Best finish: 43rd - 1971 NASCAR Winston Cup Series season
- First race: 1970 Home State 200 (North Carolina State Fairgrounds)
- Last race: 1980 Richmond 400 (Richmond Fairgrounds Raceway)
Wins	Top tens	Poles
0	1	0

William Mack Hollar, Sr. (September 6, 1938 - November 26, 2012) was a NASCAR Winston Cup Series driver who participated in 29 races out of his nine-year career in NASCAR. He was the son of Mr. and Mrs. Theodore Hollar. Prior to his NASCAR career, he faithfully served in the United States Navy.

== Career ==
While he started his races on an average of 27th place, Hollar has managed to improve his finishing position to an average of 23rd place. After racing for 5402 laps and 3,939.6 miles (6,340.2 km), Hollar has managed to earn a grand total of $13,920 ($54,392.57 when adjusted for inflation). Two top-ten finishes were earned at the 1970 Home State 200 and the 1971 Nashville 420. After retiring, Hollar attempted to qualify for the 1987 Holly Farms 400 race but failed to do so.

While Hollar would generally find success on dirt tracks by finishing in 17th place on average, his Achilles heel came on racing track with flat surfaces. He only managed to finish an average of 39th place on that kind of racing surface.

The primary vehicle used by Hollar was the No. 99 Hollar Auto Parts Chevrolet that was owned by himself.
