= Sandy Satullo II =

Racecar driver from Ohio

- Born: March 8, 1954 (age 72); Fairview Park, Ohio, U.S.

NASCAR Cup Series career
- 3 races run over 2 years
- Best finish: 79th – 1979
- First race: 1979 Gabriel 400 (Michigan)
- Last race: 1981 Talladega 500 (Talladega)
Wins	Top tens	Poles
0	0	0

Sandy Satullo II (born March 8, 1954) is an American stock car racing and sports car racing driver. Now retired, he competed in the NASCAR Winston Cup Series and the ARCA Racing Series, as well as the 24 Hours of Daytona and the Cannonball Run.

== Career ==
Satullo was a native of Fairview Park, Ohio. While he started in 34th place on average, Satullo's average finish was thirtieth place. He competed 278 laps, leading none of them. After retiring, his career total earnings were $3,860 ($13,669.66 when adjusted for inflation).

Satullo has raced at Daytona International Speedway, Michigan International Speedway, and Talladega Superspeedway.

Satullo also competed in the ARCA Racing Series, and in 1979 won the ARCA 200 at Talladega.

In later years, Satullo competed in SCCA club racing in the Spec Racer category.
