= Waddell Wilson =

NASCAR mechanic and crew chief (born 1936)

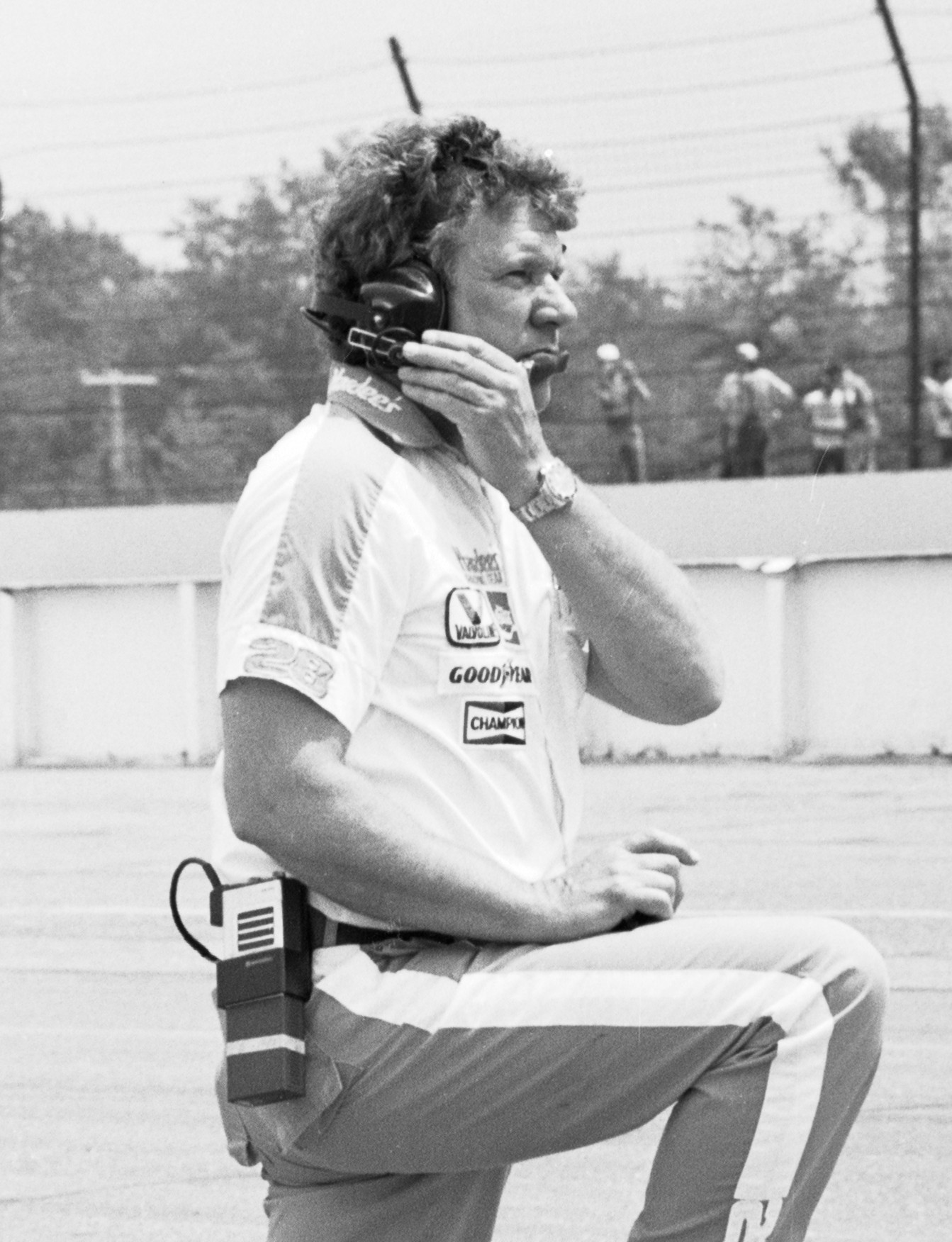
- Wilson in 1985
- Born: December 29, 1936 (age 89); Bakersville, North Carolina, U.S.
- Occupation: NASCAR engine builder/crew chief

Waddell Wilson (born December 29, 1936) is an American former NASCAR Winston Cup Series crew chief and engine builder. He was the winning crew chief for the Daytona 500 in 1980, 1983, and 1984. He was crew chief or engine builder for Holman-Moody, Harry Ranier, and Hendrick Motorsports. Drivers included Bobby Allison, Mario Andretti, Buddy Baker, Geoff Bodine, A. J. Foyt, Junior Johnson, Fred Lorenzen, Cale Yarborough and Ricky Rudd.

== Background ==
Wilson grew up in Bakersville, North Carolina. After graduating from the Nashville Auto and Diesel College in Tennessee, he worked for Cummins Diesel in Miami.

== Career ==
Wilson started driving jalopies, street stocks, and modifieds at the Hialeah, Palmetto and Hollywood short tracks in Florida. "I won a few," Waddell said, "but before long I figured building engines really was my niche."

Wilson began as an engine builder for Holman-Moody in the early 1960s and he worked for them into the 1970s. He became recognized after building the engine that Fireball Roberts used to win the 1963 Southern 500. Engines built by Wilson had 109 wins, earned 123 pole positions, and won three championships (David Pearson in 1968–69, Benny Parsons in 1973). Parsons set the record for the first 200-mile-per-hour (320 km/h) qualifying lap at Talladega using an engine built by Wilson.

Wilson later took over as a crew chief. His driver Buddy Baker won the 1980 Daytona 500. Cale Yarborough drove a Wilson-prepared car to victory in the 1983 Daytona 500, and the combination repeated their win in the 1984 Daytona 500. Yarborough and Wilson worked together for Harry Ranier in the early to mid-1980s. Between 1983 and 1986, Yarborough/Wilson won nine races in only 60 starts, including four of sixteen in 1983.

Wilson prepared an engine for Hendrick Motorsports that Darrell Waltrip used in a practice session to set an unofficial track record at Daytona that exceeded Bill Elliott's 1985 mark. Rick Hendrick named Wilson to be the crew chief for his new third Hendrick Motorsports team in 1987. Wilson worked with driver Darrell Waltrip. The friends didn't mesh well together as teammates, earning only one win, and Wilson was named the team manager after one season. He was replaced by Jeff Hammond. Wilson became Ricky Rudd's crew chief in 1990 after Hendrick reduced to a two car team. Hendrick had Wilson be the crew chief for IndyCar driver Al Unser Jr.'s only NASCAR start at the 1993 Daytona 500. Unser finished 36th after crashing out. Between 1979 and 1993, Wilson was the crew chief for 22 NASCAR Winston Cup race wins.

Yarborough later became a car owner. After working for Jim Mattei at Mattei Motorsports in 1998, Wayne Burdette who was purchasing Yarborough Motorsports hired Wilson to be his team's general manager for the 1999 season with driver Rick Mast. Wilson retired from racing in 2000 and he became a consultant for Jerico Performance Products.

== Legacy ==
Wilson received the Golden Wrench Award from the North Carolina Stock Car Racing Hall of Fame in 2006, the same year that Waltrip was inducted. Wilson was selected to be one of three retired crew chiefs to vote for the inaugural class for the NASCAR Hall of Fame. He was featured on the April 9, 2003, episode of the Speed television channel's show Men Behind the Wrenches.

== Personal life ==
Wilson is married to Barbara Wilson. They have two sons and one daughter, and they all work in motorsports.

== Author ==
In 1990, Wilson released a book on preparing race motors called Race Engine Preparation.

- Race Engine Preparation Waddell Wilson, ISBN 0-936834-06-4
