= Bank of America Roval 400 =

Former auto race held in Charlotte, United States

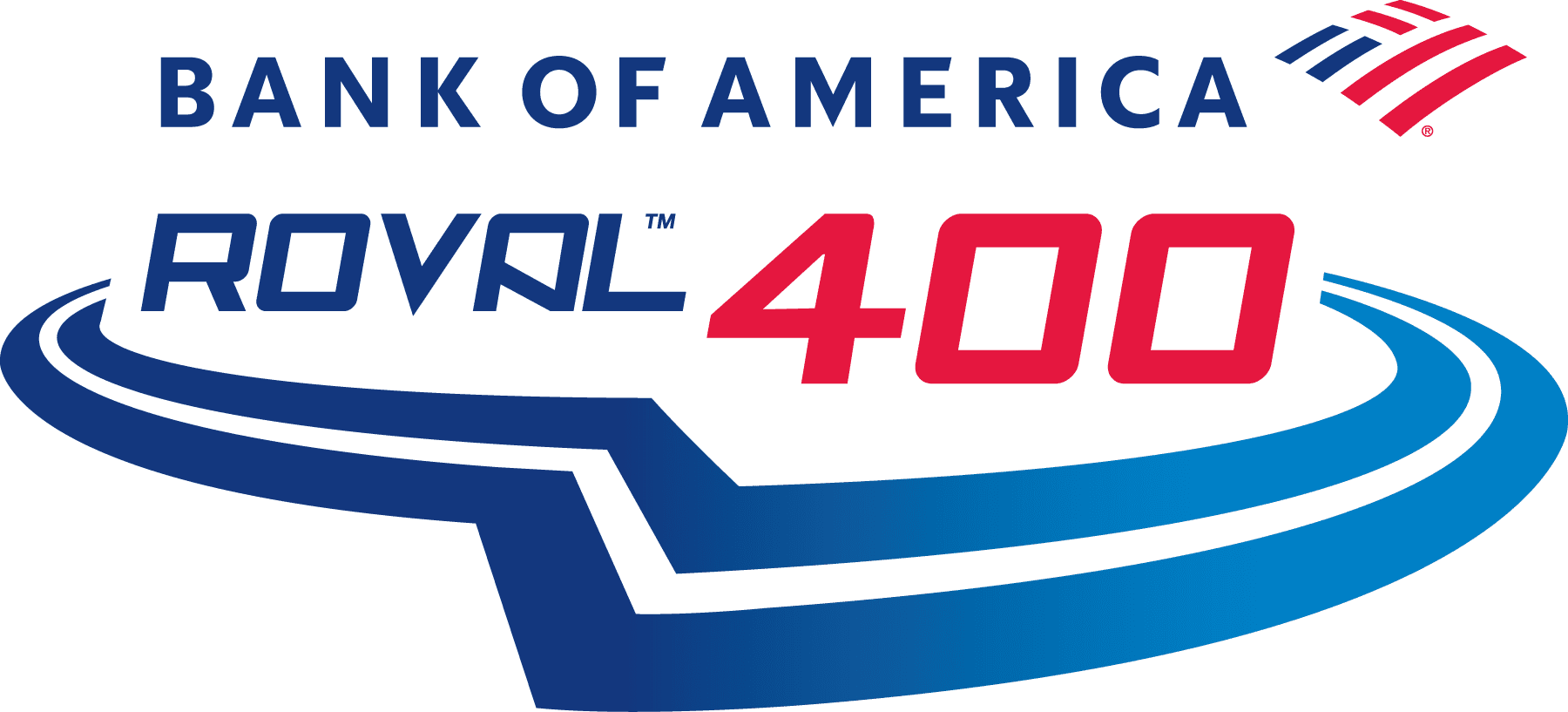

NASCAR Cup Series
- Venue: Charlotte Motor Speedway roval
- Location: Concord, North Carolina, United States
- Corporate sponsor: Bank of America
- First race: 2018
- Last race: 2025
- Distance: 407.006 km (252.902 mi)
- Laps: 109; Stages 1/2: 25 each Final stage: 59
- Most wins (driver): Chase Elliott; Kyle Larson (2)
- Most wins (team): Hendrick Motorsports (4)
- Most wins (manufacturer): Chevrolet (6)

Circuit information
- Surface: Asphalt
- Length: 3.73 km (2.32 mi)
- Turns: 17

The Bank of America Roval 400 was a NASCAR Cup Series race that was held annually from 2018 to 2025 at Charlotte Motor Speedway in Concord, North Carolina, United States. it was the second of two NASCAR races at the speedway, with the other being the 600-mile (970 km) Coca-Cola 600 on Memorial Day weekend.

The event was run as a 400 kilometer (248.5 mi) race using the infield road course configuration the track calls "The Roval" due to the combination of the Road Course and Oval. Reconfigurations to the Roval layout for the 2024 season onwards increased the length of the race to 407 kilometers (252.9 mi), while the lap count remained the same at 109.

Shane van Gisbergen is the final winner of the event.

Following the 2025 race, the race was again replaced by an oval-track race called the Bank of America 400.

== History ==
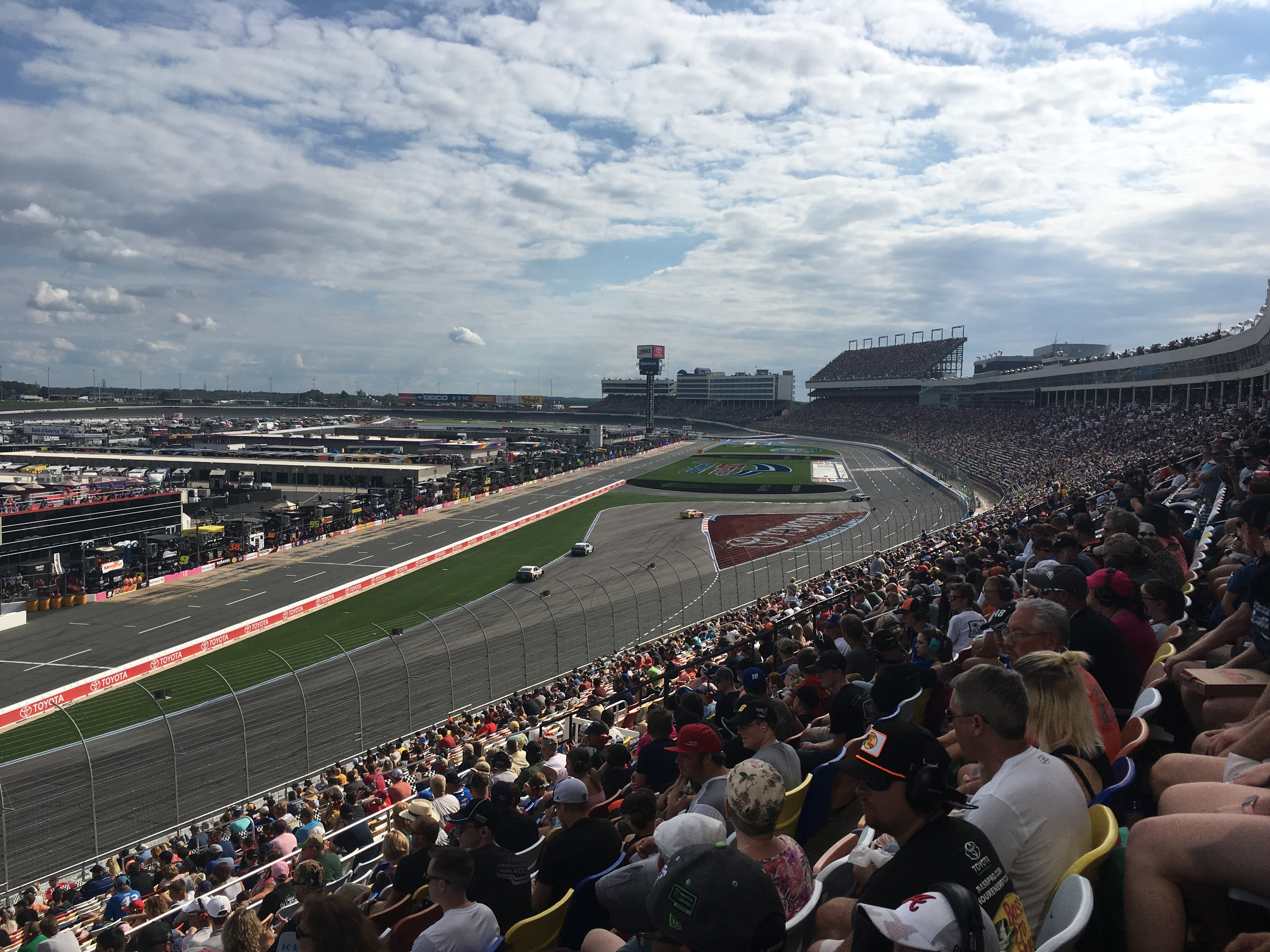
The 2018 Bank of America Roval 400, the first race held on the road course configuration

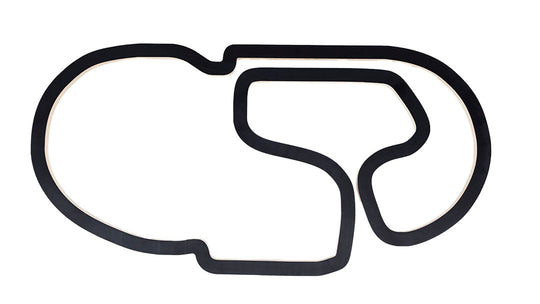
The configuration of the Roval, from 2018 to 2023.

The fall Charlotte race was originally held on the main oval layout until 2017, in which it was a Saturday night race from 2003 to 2016 following a rating boost from the 2002 race being delayed to later in the night (coincided with television primetime hours), although the final two races were held on Sunday afternoon due to rain delays. The 2017 race, the final race on the oval layout, reverted to a Sunday daytime race.

Starting in 2018, the race utilizes a 2.28 miles (3.67 km) road course configuration of Charlotte Motor Speedway, with a race distance of 400 kilometers (250 mi) over 109 laps. Ryan Blaney would win the inaugural Roval Cup race after Martin Truex Jr. and Jimmie Johnson collided on the final lap.

=== Realignment ===
In 2020, the Bank of America Roval 400 was moved from late September to the middle of October and beheld as the final race of the Round of 12; the Bass Pro Shops Night Race at Bristol Motor Speedway took Charlotte's former spot. Although rain was present, the 2020 races were run without any delays as cars continued in the wet with limited lighting, as was the case in the Xfinity race, making it the first NASCAR Cup race to use wet tires.

=== Reconfiguration ===
On May 26, 2024, it was announced on the day of the 2024 Coca-Cola 600 that the roval version would be getting a redesign, featuring an extension of turn five and six, tighter turn seven.

Scheduled to be held in 2026, it was announced on February 3 that the race would move back to the oval, ending a seven-year run on the race.

== Past winners ==
Year	Date	No.	Driver	Team	Manufacturer	Race distance		Race time	Average speed (mph)	Report	Ref
Year	Date	No.	Driver	Team	Manufacturer	Laps	Miles (km)	Race time	Average speed (mph)	Report	Ref
Road course + oval (roval), 2.28 mi (3.67 km)
2018	September 30	12	Ryan Blaney	Team Penske	Ford	109	248.52 (399.954)	3:01:34	82.125	Report	
2019	September 29	9	Chase Elliott	Hendrick Motorsports	Chevrolet	109	248.52 (399.954)	3:20:58	75.499	Report	
2020	October 11	9	Chase Elliott	Hendrick Motorsports	Chevrolet	109	248.52 (399.954)	3:17:11	76.948	Report	
2021	October 10	5	Kyle Larson	Hendrick Motorsports	Chevrolet	109	248.52 (399.954)	3:15:04	77.783	Report	
2022	October 9	20	Christopher Bell	Joe Gibbs Racing	Toyota	112*	255.36 (410.961)	2:59:54	86.661	Report	
2023	October 8	16	A. J. Allmendinger	Kaulig Racing	Chevrolet	109	248.52 (399.954)	3:05:57	81.596	Report	
Road course + oval (roval), 2.32 mi (3.73 km)
2024	October 13	5	Kyle Larson	Hendrick Motorsports	Chevrolet	109	252.88 (406.971)	3:00:03	82.817	Report	
2025	October 5	88	Shane van Gisbergen	Trackhouse Racing	Chevrolet	109	252.88 (406.971)	3:03:51	81.105	Report	

- 2022: Race extended due to a NASCAR Overtime finish.

=== Multiple winners (drivers) ===
# wins	Driver	Years won
2	Chase Elliott	2019, 2020
2	Kyle Larson	2021, 2024

=== Multiple winners (teams) ===
# wins	Team	Years won
4	Hendrick Motorsports	2019–2021, 2024

=== Manufacturer wins ===
# wins	Manufacturer	Years won
6	Chevrolet	2019–2021, 2023, 2024–2025
1	Ford	2018
1	Toyota	2022
