= 1967 Wilkes 400 =

American NASCAR auto race in 1967

Race details
- Race 46 of 49 in the 1967 NASCAR Grand National Series season
- 1967 Wilkes 400 program cover
- Date: October 1, 1967
- Official name: Wilkes 400
- Location: North Wilkesboro Speedway, North Wilkesboro, North Carolina
- Course: Permanent racing facility
- Course length: 0.625 miles (1.005 km)
- Distance: 400 laps, 250 mi (402 km)
- Weather: Mild with temperatures of 75.9 °F (24.4 °C); wind speeds of 8.9 miles per hour (14.3 km/h)
- Average speed: 94.837 miles per hour (152.625 km/h)
- Attendance: 9,800

Pole position
| Driver | Dick Hutcherson | Bondy Long |
- Time: 21.570

Most laps led
| Driver | Richard Petty | Petty Enterprises |
- Laps: 256

Winner
| No. 43 | Richard Petty | Petty Enterprises |

Television in the United States
- Network: untelevised
- Announcers: none

The 1967 Wilkes 400 was a NASCAR Grand National Series event that was held on October 1, 1967, at North Wilkesboro Speedway in North Wilkesboro.

The transition to purpose-built racecars began in the early 1960s and occurred gradually over that decade. Changes made to the sport by the late 1960s brought an end to the "strictly stock" vehicles of the 1950s.

== Background ==
Through the 1960s and 1970s the NASCAR Grand National Series began focusing on bigger, faster, and longer tracks. Like other short tracks in NASCAR at the time, crowd capacity and purses were small compared to the larger tracks. Over time, Enoch Staley and Jack Combs attempted to keep the facility modern and on pace with the growth of the sport. The West Grandstand was rebuilt with chair-type seats rather than the old bare concrete slabs. New larger restroom facilities were built, and the South Grandstand was expanded. A garage facility was also built within the track, which at the time was rare for short-track venues. But the main focus was on keeping ticket prices affordable. Food and beverage prices were kept low, and event parking and camping were always free. As long as profits covered maintenance costs, Staley was satisfied with the income of the track.

In the Gwyn Staley 160 of 1960, Junior Johnson beat 21 other drivers for the pole position with a lap speed of 83.860 mph. Glen Wood overtook Johnson to lead the first lap, but Johnson had the race under control and led the next 145 laps. Lee Petty moved up from the eighth starting position to challenge Johnson late in the race. With 14 laps remaining, Johnson and Petty made contact. Johnson's car was sent spinning into the guardrail. Petty lead the final 14 laps to win his third straight race at North Wilkesboro. The crowd of 9,200 pelted Petty with bottles, rocks, and debris after his win; he had done their local hero wrong. When Petty took the microphone in Victory Lane to explain his side of the story, the crowd began jeering. Rex White finished second, and Wood placed third. Ned Jarrett finished fourth under the alias John Lentz.

The length of the fall race in 1960 was increased from its usual 160 laps / 100 miles to 320 laps / 200 miles, this it became known as the Wilkes 320. Speeds increased immensely from the previous record, 1.83 seconds quicker than any previous qualifying lap (86.806 to 93.399 mph). Rex White posted the fastest qualifying lap and dethroned Lee Petty from his three-race winning streak at North Wilkesboro. Junior Johnson finished about half a lap behind White in second place.

In the 1961 running of the Gwyn Staley 400, Junior Johnson recorded another pole, this time by 0.57 seconds better than the previous track record, with his qualifying time of 23.52 (95.660 mph). Johnson led all of the 62 laps he ran before transmission problems forced him out of the race. Fred Lorenzen led the next 61 laps until engine problems took him out of the running. And Curtis Turner led 56 laps before experiencing problems as well. 1960 Grand National Champion Rex White, who started on the outside pole, led the remaining 221 laps and won the race. Tommy Irwin started the race in sixth position and finished the Gwyn Staley 400 two laps behind White. Richard Petty followed in third place. Fireball Roberts, in a Pontiac owned by Smokey Yunick, finished fourth (ten laps down), and Johnny Allen, who crashed out of the race on his 387th lap, still finished in fifth place. Only 12 of the 25 cars that entered the race were running at the finish of the first 400-lap edition of the Gwyn Staley race.

In the 1963 Wilkes 400, Fred Lorenzen captured his third straight pole at the track by breaking his own record with a lap time of 23.30 seconds / 96.566 mph. Richard Petty entered the race in an attempt to become the first driver to win four consecutive races at North Wilkesboro. But he experienced engine problems and lasted only 45 laps into the race. Lorenzen led 58 laps, but came up short of victory, six seconds behind winner Marvin Panch. Panch did not start the 1963 season until halfway through because he had nearly lost his life in a crash while testing a Maserati at Daytona that February. Panch, in a Wood Brothers car, started third and led 131 laps in the race. Holman-Moody took the next three spots in the final rundown, with Lorenzen second, Nelson Stacy third, and Fireball Roberts fourth. Stacy started fourth and led 56 laps, while Roberts started from the outside pole and led the most laps with 155.

The track was repaved just prior to the Gwyn Staley 400 in 1964, and the resulting lack of traction wreaked havoc. Fireball Roberts, Buck Baker, Buddy Arrington, and G.C. Spencer all crashed through the wooden guardrail in the first and second turns in Saturday's practice and qualifying. Roberts was unable to start the race because his Ford had been so heavily damaged. Fred Lorenzen won the pole and led 368 laps on the way to the win.

Junior Johnson was the pole sitter for the 1965 Gwyn Staley 400, with a qualifying time and speed of 22.27 seconds / 101.033 mph, breaking his own record by 0.06 seconds. Marvin Panch was leading the race when a blown tire caused him to crash with 11 laps remaining. Johnson assumed the lead from there and won his third of 13 wins in 1965. Johnson lead during most of the race, 356 laps in total. Bobby Johns in a Holman-Moody Ford finished in the runner-up position, seven seconds behind Johnson. Finishing third, one lap down, was Ned Jarrett. Jarrett had led 20 laps early in the race. Dick Hutcherson, in his Holman-Moody Ford, finished seven laps off the pace in fourth place, and Panch finished fifth. Panch led on three occasions during the race for a total of 24 laps.

In the Wilkes 400 of 1965, Fred Lorenzen won the pole and led the first 190 laps before engine problems forced him out of the race on Lap 219. Junior Johnson took the lead from the fading Lorenzen to pick up his 50th and final Grand National Series victory by two laps over Cale Yarborough. Only 16 of the 35 cars that entered the race were running at the finish.

Jim Paschal started the 1966 Gwyn Staley 400 from the pole position with a record lap time and speed of 21.91 sec / 102.693 mph. Paschal led 308 laps and won by six laps over G.C. Spencer, the largest margin of victory at North Wilkesboro in a Grand National Series race. David Pearson started on the outside pole, and despite losing an engine with 18 laps to go he finished third. Wendell Scott finished fourth (22 laps down), and Clarence Henly Gray finished fifth (25 laps down). Only 14 of the 37 cars entered in the race were running at the finish. Richard Petty was the only driver besides Paschal to lead any laps in the race. He led 92 laps before falling back to finish 11th (53 laps down).

Darel Dieringer completely dominated the 1967 Gwyn Staley 400, driving for Junior Johnson. Dieringer got the pole with a lap of 21.50 seconds / 104.693 mph and lead all 400 laps. He was the first driver to run a Grand National Series race of over 250 miles while leading from start to finish. He lapped the whole field twice at one point. Dieringer took the checked flag after he ran out of gas in Turn Four of the last lap and coasted to the finish line. This was Dieringer's last Grand National victory. Cale Yarborough, driving the No. 21 Wood Brothers Ford, finished second, one lap behind Dieringer. A 20-lap qualifying race to make the field was won by Clyde Lynn.

== Race report ==
This event was the site of Richard Petty's 75th victory in his NASCAR Cup Series career; making him acquire a 10-race win streak. His racing team was Petty Enterprises (now a part of Richard Petty Motorsports) and the vehicle that Petty took to the finish line with him was a 1967 Plymouth Belvedere with the #43 as its racing number. In today's NASCAR Cup Series, people who regularly watch the races would be upset if the same driver won so many races in one season and complained about cheating.

Two hours, thirty-eight minutes, and ten seconds were needed for the race to reach its full conclusion. Richard Petty managed to defeat Dick Hutcherson by more than two laps; making it the third consecutive race where Hutcherson finished second to Petty in addition to being the fourth time in five events. Other competitors included Canadian drivers Frog Fagan and Don Biederman along with LeeRoy Yarbrough (in his Ford), Cale Yarborough (in his Dodge), Wendell Scott (in his Dodge), and Elmo Langley (in his Ford). Melvin Bradley would make his last NASCAR Grand National series start in this event.

Notable speeds were 94.837 miles per hour (152.625 km/h) as the average speed and 104.312 miles per hour (167.874 km/h) as the pole position speed. Three cautions slowed the race for 20 laps.

Bud Hartje, Dale Inman, Bill Ellis, Frankie Scott, and Herb Nab were a few of the notable crew chiefs to actively participate in the race.

Total winnings for this race were $18,100 ($174,768 when considering inflation). Richard Petty received the majority of the bounty with $4,725 in winnings ($45,623 when considering inflation).

=== Qualifying ===
| Grid | No. | Driver | Manufacturer | Speed | Qualifying time | Owner |
|---|---|---|---|---|---|---|
| 1 | 29 | Dick Hutcherson | '67 Ford | 104.312 | 21.570 | Bondy Long |
| 2 | 26 | LeeRoy Yarbrough | '67 Ford | 104.215 | 21.590 | Junior Johnson |
| 3 | 14 | Jim Paschal | '67 Plymouth | 104.022 | 21.630 | Tom Friedkin |
| 4 | 17 | David Pearson | '67 Ford | 103.830 | 21.670 | Holman-Moody |
| 5 | 43 | Richard Petty | '67 Plymouth | 103.687 | 21.700 | Petty Enterprises |
| 6 | 99 | Paul Goldsmith | '67 Plymouth | 103.687 | 21.700 | Ray Nichels |
| 7 | 2 | Bobby Allison | '67 Chevrolet | 103.496 | 21.740 | Donald Brackins |
| 8 | 40 | Jerry Grant | '67 Plymouth | 103.022 | 21.840 | Tom Friedkin |
| 9 | 48 | James Hylton | '65 Ford | 102.834 | 21.880 | Bud Hartje |
| 10 | 6 | Buddy Baker | '67 Dodge | 102.693 | 21.910 | Cotton Owens |

Failed to qualify: Buddy Arrington (#67), Max Ledbetter (#35), Earl Brooks (#76), E.J. Trivette (#19), Tom Raley (#54), George Poulos (#57)

== Finishing order ==
Section reference:

| POS | ST | # | DRIVER | SPONSOR / OWNER | CAR | LAPS | MONEY | STATUS | LED |
|---|---|---|---|---|---|---|---|---|---|
| 1 | 5 | 43 | Richard Petty | Petty Enterprises | '67 Plymouth | 400 | 4725 | running | 256 |
| 2 | 1 | 29 | Dick Hutcherson | Bondy Long | '67 Ford | 398 | 2400 | running | 20 |
| 3 | 2 | 26 | LeeRoy Yarbrough | Junior Johnson | '67 Ford | 398 | 1300 | running | 0 |
| 4 | 7 | 2 | Bobby Allison | Donald Brackins | '67 Chevrolet | 398 | 1125 | running | 96 |
| 5 | 3 | 14 | Jim Paschal | Friedkin Enterprises (Tom Friedkin) | '67 Plymouth | 398 | 650 | running | 9 |
| 6 | 12 | 74 | Tom Pistone | Turkey Minton | '67 Chevrolet | 389 | 525 | running | 0 |
| 7 | 21 | 06 | Cale Yarborough | Neil Castles | '65 Dodge | 386 | 600 | running | 0 |
| 8 | 15 | 1 | Swede Savage | Holman-Moody Racing | '67 Ford | 386 | 425 | running | 0 |
| 9 | 16 | 4 | John Sears | L.G. DeWitt | '66 Ford | 372 | 375 | running | 0 |
| 10 | 28 | 63 | Melvin Bradley | Bob Adams | '66 Ford | 370 | 325 | running | 0 |
| 11 | 29 | 34 | Wendell Scott | Wendell Scott | '66 Ford | 369 | 300 | running | 0 |
| 12 | 24 | 02 | Bob Cooper | Bob Cooper | '66 Chevrolet | 369 | 275 | running | 0 |
| 13 | 27 | 45 | Bill Seifert | Bill Seifert | '66 Ford | 368 | 275 | running | 0 |
| 14 | 30 | 0 | Eddie Yarboro | A.C. Rakestraw | '65 Dodge | 362 | 250 | running | 0 |
| 15 | 33 | 38 | Wayne Smith | Archie Smith | '66 Chevrolet | 356 | 200 | running | 0 |
| 16 | 23 | 88 | Doug Cooper | Buck Baker | '67 Oldsmobile | 328 | 250 | engine | 0 |
| 17 | 22 | 11 | J.T. Putney | J.T. Putney | '66 Chevrolet | 300 | 300 | engine | 0 |
| 18 | 9 | 48 | James Hylton | Econo Wash (Bud Hartje) | '65 Ford | 236 | 300 | engine | 0 |
| 19 | 13 | 49 | G.C. Spencer | G.C. Spencer | '67 Plymouth | 235 | 225 | engine | 0 |
| 20 | 19 | 9 | Earl Brooks | Truett Rodgers | '66 Chevrolet | 215 | 225 | rear end | 0 |
| 21 | 6 | 99 | Paul Goldsmith | Nichels Engineering (Ray Nichels) | '67 Plymouth | 173 | 200 | engine | 19 |
| 22 | 25 | 20 | Clyde Lynn | Clyde Lynn | '66 Ford | 144 | 200 | rear end | 0 |
| 23 | 17 | 64 | Elmo Langley | Elmo Langley / Henry Woodfield | '66 Ford | 120 | 200 | oil pressure | 0 |
| 24 | 10 | 6 | Buddy Baker | Cotton Owens | '67 Dodge | 114 | 225 | engine | 0 |
| 25 | 31 | 97 | Henley Gray | Henley Gray | '66 Ford | 107 | 175 | steering | 0 |
| 26 | 14 | 81 | Jack Ingram | Tommy Ingram | '66 Chevrolet | 86 | 200 | rear end | 0 |
| 27 | 26 | 25 | Jabe Thomas | Don Robertson | '67 Ford | 83 | 200 | transmission | 0 |
| 28 | 34 | 94 | Don Biederman | Ron Stotten | '66 Chevrolet | 71 | 175 | rear end | 0 |
| 29 | 20 | 07 | George Davis | George Davis | '66 Chevrolet | 57 | 200 | clutch | 0 |
| 30 | 18 | 92 | Bobby Wawak | Bobby Wawak | '65 Plymouth | 37 | 200 | rear end | 0 |
| 31 | 8 | 40 | Jerry Grant | Friedkin Enterprises (Tom Friedkin) | '67 Plymouth | 36 | 175 | engine | 0 |
| 32 | 32 | 8 | Ed Negre | Ed Negre | '67 Ford | 36 | 150 | throttle | 0 |
| 33 | 11 | 53 | Bud Moore | Activated Angels (A.J. King) | '67 Dodge | 28 | 175 | handling | 0 |
| 34 | 4 | 17 | David Pearson | Holman-Moody Racing | '67 Ford | 17 | 425 | engine | 0 |
| 35 | 35 | 75 | Frog Fagan | Bob Gilreath | '66 Ford | 16 | 150 | engine | 0 |
Failed to qualify, withdrew, or driver changes:
| POS | | NBR | NAME | SPONSOR | CAR | | | | |
| | | 19 | E.J. Trivette | | Ford | | | | |
| | | 35 | Max Ledbetter | | Oldsmobile | | | | |
| | | 54 | Tom Raley | | Ford | | | | |
| | | 57 | George Poulos | | Plymouth | | | | |
| | | 67 | Buddy Arrington | | Dodge | | | | |
| | | 76 | Earl Brooks | | Ford | | | | |

== Timeline ==
Section reference:

- Start of race: Dick Hutcherson began the event with the pole position.
- Lap 16: Frog Fagan became the last-place finisher due to engine issues.
- Lap 17: David Pearson's engine had a meltdown, forcing Pearson to exit the race.
- Lap 21: Jim Paschal took over the lead from Dick Hutcherson.
- Lap 30: Paul Goldsmith took over the lead from Jim Paschal.
- Lap 49: Bobby Allison took over the lead from Paul Goldsmith.
- Lap 107: Richard Petty took over the lead from Bobby Allison.
- Lap 143: Bobby Allison took over the lead from Richard Petty.
- Lap 181: Richard Petty took over the lead from Bobby Allison.
- Lap 215: Earl Brooks managed to lose his vehicle's rear end.
- Lap 235: G.C. Spencer managed to blow his car's engine.
- Lap 236: James Hylton managed to blow his car's engine.
- Lap 300: J.T. Putney managed to blow his car's engine.
- Lap 328: Doug Cooper managed to blow his car's engine.
- Finish: Richard Petty was officially declared the winner of the event.

| Preceded by 1967 Old Dominion 500 | NASCAR Winston Cup Series Season; 1967 | Succeeded by 1967 National 500 |
| Preceded by 1967 Old Dominion 500 | Richard Petty's Career Wins; 1960-1984 | Succeeded by 1968 untitled race at Montgomery Speedway |
