= 1964 Atlanta 500 =

Auto race held at Atlanta International Raceway in 1964

Race details
- Race 13 of 62 in the 1964 NASCAR Grand National Series season
- Fred Lorenzen, in victory circle, after winning the 1964 Atlanta 500
- Date: April 5, 1964
- Official name: Atlanta 500
- Location: Atlanta International Raceway, Hampton, Georgia
- Course: Permanent racing facility
- Course length: 1.500 miles (2.414 km)
- Distance: 334 laps, 501.000 mi (806.281 km)
- Weather: Cold with temperatures of 57.9 °F (14.4 °C); wind speeds of 17.1 miles per hour (27.5 km/h)
- Average speed: 134.137 mph (215.873 km/h)
- Attendance: 50,000

Pole position
Driver	Fred Lorenzen	Holman Moody

Most laps led
Driver	Fred Lorenzen	Holman Moody
- Laps: 206

Winner
No. 28	Fred Lorenzen	Holman Moody

Television in the United States
- Network: CBS
- Announcers: unknown

The 1964 Atlanta 500 was a NASCAR Grand National Series event that was held on April 5, 1964, at Atlanta International Raceway in Hampton, Georgia, the fifth annual race in the history of the Atlanta 500 series of races.

This race had only ten vehicles surviving to the finish. Many of top NASCAR teams suffered from engine failure along with the non-contenders. Five race-ending crashes were recorded in this event; with some footage of the race being used for the drive-in movie Speed Lovers.

== Background ==
Atlanta International Raceway (now Atlanta Motor Speedway) is one of ten current intermediate track to hold NASCAR races. The layout at Atlanta International Speedway at the time was a four-turn traditional oval track that is 1.54 miles (2.48 km) long. The track's turns are banked at twenty-four degrees, while the front stretch, the location of the finish line, and the back stretch are banked at five.

== Race report ==
Notable drivers who finished outside the top ten included Darel Dieringer, Paul Goldsmith, Roy Tyner, Cale Yarborough, LeeRoy Yarbrough, Fireball Roberts, and A. J. Foyt. Fred Lorenzen defeated Bobby Isaac by two laps after almost four hours to extend the era of "Fearless Freddie's Fast Ford". Fifty thousand spectators would see four caution periods lasting for 19 laps and 11 lead changes. Goldsmith would flip his car after leading the first 55 laps but would get out of the wreckage unharmed.

Jimmy Helms and Ken Spikes made their first NASCAR Cup starts while Dave MacDonald raced his final NASCAR race here. Neil Castles ended in last place due to a handling problem on the second lap of this 334-lap race.

The total purse of the race was $57,655 ($598,511 when adjusted for inflation); Lorenzen would walk away with $18,000 ($186,856 when adjusted for inflation). Notable crew chiefs in this event include Jimmy Helms, Dale Inman, Herb Nab, Bud Allman, Glen Wood, Shorty Johns, Bud Moore and Banjo Matthews.

The transition to purpose-built racecars began in the early 1960s and occurred gradually over that decade. Changes made to the sport by the late 1960s brought an end to the "strictly stock" vehicles of the 1950s.

=== Qualifying ===
Grid	No.	Driver	Manufacturer	Owner
1	28	Fred Lorenzen	'64 Ford	Holman-Moody Racing
2	00	A. J. Foyt	'64 Ford	Banjo Matthews
3	25	Paul Goldsmith	'64 Plymouth	Ray Nichels
4	22	Fireball Roberts	'64 Ford	Holman-Moody Racing
5	1	Billy Wade	'64 Mercury	Bud Moore
6	26	Bobby Isaac	'64 Dodge	Ray Nichels
7	15	Parnelli Jones	'64 Mercury	Bill Stroppe
8	43	Richard Petty	'64 Plymouth	Petty Enterprises
9	3	Junior Johnson	'64 Dodge	Ray Fox
10	06	Larry Frank	'64 Ford	Holman-Moody Racing
11	12	Dan Gurney	'64 Ford	Wood Brothers
12	21	Marvin Panch	'64 Ford	Wood Brothers
13	54	Jimmy Pardue	'64 Plymouth	Charles Robinson
14	41	Buck Baker	'64 Plymouth	Petty Enterprises
15	01	Rex White	'64 Mercury	Bud Moore

== Top 10 finishers ==
Pos	Grid	No.	Driver	Manufacturer	Laps	Winnings	Laps led	Time/Status
1	1	28	Fred Lorenzen	Ford	334	$18,000	206	3:46:05
2	6	26	Bobby Isaac	Dodge	332	$8,065	37	+2 laps
3	18	11	Ned Jarrett	Ford	331	$4,500	0	+3 laps
4	9	3	Junior Johnson	Dodge	330	$2,925	0	+4 laps
5	14	41	Buck Baker	Plymouth	327	$1,800	0	+7 laps
6	22	35	Tiny Lund	Plymouth	326	$1,275	0	+8 laps
7	8	43	Richard Petty	Plymouth	325	$1,100	0	+9 laps
8	24	5	Jim Paschal	Dodge	315	$1,050	0	+19 laps
9	28	82	Bill McMahan	Pontiac	279	$925	0	+55 laps
10	30	95	Ken Spikes	Dodge	269	$925	0	+65 laps

== Timeline ==
Section reference:

- Start of race: Fred Lorenzen started out with the pole position but Paul Goldsmith quickly overtook him.
- Lap 2: Neil Castles just could not handle his vehicle properly; forcing him to exit the race due to safety reasons.
- Lap 3: A frame came off Joe Clark's vehicle; ending his day on the track.
- Lap 19: Jimmy Pardue had a terminal crash; forcing him to leave the event prematurely.
- Lap 22: The rear end managed to come off Jimmy Helms' vehicle; causing him to get a 34th-place finish.
- Lap 26: Ignition problems managed to sideline Jack Anderson.
- Lap 31: Larry Thomas' day on the track came to a rough end due to a faulty ignition in his vehicle.
- Lap 41: Darel Dieringer had a terminal crash; making him accept a rather lousy 31st-place finish.
- Lap 42: Roy Mayne just could not handle his vehicle properly; ending his day on the track.
- Lap 55: Paul Goldsmith had a terminal crash; forcing him to retire from the race.
- Lap 56: Fireball Roberts took over the lead from Fred Lorenzen.
- Lap 59: Jim Hurtubise took over the lead from Fireball Roberts.
- Lap 60: Curtis Crider had to bring an overheating vehicle out of the race prematurely.
- Lap 61: Marvin Panch took over the lead from Jim Hurtubuise.
- Lap 74: Cale Yarborough noticed that some of his gasoline was leaking out of his vehicle.
- Lap 77: Jim Hurtubise managed to lose the rear end of his vehicle; causing him to accept a 23rd-place finish.
- Lap 78: Engine problems managed to take LeeRoy Yarbrough out of the race.
- Lap 92: Fred Lorenzen took over the lead from Marvin Panch.
- Lap 106: David Pearson had a terminal crash.
- Lap 107: Fireball Roberts had a terminal crash.
- Lap 110: A frame managed to come off Larry Frank's vehicle.
- Lap 113: Bobby Isaac took over the lead from Fred Lorenzen.
- Lap 114: Fred Lorenzen took over the lead from Bobby Isaac.
- Lap 119: Rex White had to nurse his troublesome engine away from the race.
- Lap 130: Bobby Isaac took over the lead from Fred Lorenzen.
- Lap 149: The head gasket managed to come off Bobby Johns' vehicle; making it too dangerous for him to continue racing at high speeds.
- Lap 150: Fred Lorenzen took over the lead from Bobby Isaac; Dave MacDonald's engine started to blow causing his 16th-place finish.
- Lap 151: Bobby Isaac took over the lead from Fred Lorenzen.
- Lap 167: Fred Lorenzen took over the lead from Bobby Isaac.
- Lap 173: Jim McElreath's vehicle would develop engine problems severe enough to force him out of the race.
- Lap 190: Marvin Panch's vehicle developed problems with its engine.
- Lap 225: Billy Wade's engine stopped working on this lap.
- Lap 246: A.J. Foyt had to accept an 11th-place finish due to his malfunctioning engine.
- Finish: Fred Lorenzen was officially declared the winner of the event.

Preceded by 1963	Atlanta 500 races 1964	Succeeded by 1965
