= 1963 Old Dominion 500 =

Auto race held at Martinsville Speedway in 1963

Race details
- Race 48 of 55 in the 1963 NASCAR Grand National Series season
- A map showing the layout of Martinsville Speedway
- Date: September 22, 1963
- Official name: Old Dominion 500
- Location: Martinsville Speedway, Martinsville, Virginia
- Course: Permanent racing facility
- Course length: 0.525 miles (0.844 km)
- Distance: 500 laps, 262.5 mi (442.4 km)
- Weather: Mild with temperatures of 73.9 °F (23.3 °C); wind speeds of 17.1 miles per hour (27.5 km/h)
- Average speed: 67.486 mph (108.608 km/h)
- Attendance: 20,000

Pole position
Driver	Junior Johnson	Fox Racing
- Time: 24.530 seconds

Most laps led
Driver	Fred Lorenzen	Holman-Moody
- Laps: 421

Winner
No. 28	Fred Lorenzen	Holman-Moody

Television in the United States
- Network: untelevised
- Announcers: none

The 1963 Old Dominion 500 was a NASCAR Grand National Series event that was held on September 22, 1963, at Martinsville Speedway in Martinsville, Virginia.

== Background ==
Martinsville Speedway is one of five short tracks to hold NASCAR races. The standard track at Martinsville Speedway is a four-turn short track oval that is 0.526 miles (0.847 km) long. The track's turns are banked at eleven degrees, while the front stretch, the location of the finish line, is banked at zero degrees. The back stretch also has a zero degree banking.

== Race report ==
The race was scheduled for 500 laps; taking three hours and forty-two minutes to complete. Fred Lorenzen defeated Marvin Panch by a single lap and two seconds. Twenty thousand people came to witness three lead changes and five cautions for eighteen laps. Junior Johnson won the pole position for this race; driving speeds up to 73.379 miles per hour (118.092 km/h) in qualifying. Speeds during the actual race managed to reach up to 67.486 miles per hour (108.608 km/h).

Jimmy Massey became the last-place finisher after having to drop out prior to the race due to a terminal crash with Jimmy Pardue. Jack Anderson pulled out of the race on lap 13 after dealing with a faulty head gasket in his vehicle. An oil leak would take Bobby Keck out of the action on lap 26. A faulty vehicle bearing forced Perk Brown out of the race on lap 43. Problems with the vehicles' brakes would force Major Melton and Fred Harb to retire from the race.

Perk Brown and Major Melton would end their NASCAR Grand National Series careers after the conclusion of this race.

Most of the car owners that were involved in the race were independents and had no affiliation with a multi-car team. This race still holds the record for the fewest leaders in a NASCAR Cup Series race at Martinsville along with the 1961 Old Dominion 500, the 1965 Old Dominion 500 and the 1976 Old Dominion 500. Individual winnings for this race were as low as $100 ($1,052 when adjusted for inflation) and as high as $3,800 ($39,962 when adjusted for inflation).

At least nine notable crew chiefs attended this race; including Ray Fox, Herman Beam, Glen Wood and Herb Nab.

The transition to purpose-built racecars began in the early 1960s and occurred gradually over that decade. Changes made to the sport by the late 1960s brought an end to the "strictly stock" vehicles of the 1950s.

== Timeline ==
Section reference:

- Start of race: Junior Johnson had the pole position to begin the event, two drivers would crash into each other before the first official lap.
- Lap 13: The head gasket on Jack Anderson's vehicle came off.
- Lap 26: An oil leak from Bobby Keck's vehicle forced him to leave to track as not to endanger his fellow drivers.
- Lap 41: A bearing came off Perk Brown's vehicle, forcing him to accept a 32nd-place finish.
- Lap 52: Fred Lorenzen took over the lead from Junior Johnson.
- Lap 53: Junior Johnson took over the lead from Fred Lorenzen.
- Lap 81: Fred Lorenzen took over the lead from Junior Johnson.
- Lap 82: The hub on J.D. McDuffie's vehicle broke off, denying him yet another NASCAR Cup Series victory.
- Lap 101: The ball joint on Bill Widenhouse's vehicle became non-functional.
- Lap 130: The valve on Roy Tyner's vehicle somehow became problematic.
- Lap 183: Rex White had a terminal crash, causing him not to finish the race.
- Lap 211: Al White managed to overheat his vehicle from high speed stock car racing.
- Lap 296: Junior Johnson had a terminal crash, ending his race a bit too soon.
- Lap 300: Larry Frank's vehicle managed to overheat while racing.
- Lap 362: Ned Jarrett's engine became problematic, ending his race weekend early.
- Lap 430: Reb Wickersham had a terminal crash, forcing him to leave the race prematurely.
- Finish: Fred Lorenzen was officially declared the winner of the event.

=== Qualifying ===
Grid	No.	Driver	Manufacturer	Speed	Qualifying time	Owner
1	3	Junior Johnson	'63 Chevrolet	73.379	24.530	Ray Fox
2	28	Fred Lorenzen	'63 Ford	73.289	24.560	Holman-Moody
3	22	Fireball Roberts	'63 Ford	72.845	24.710	Holman-Moody
4	4	Rex White	'63 Mercury	72.144	24.950	Rex White
5	21	Marvin Panch	'63 Ford	72.144	24.960	Wood Brothers
6	11	Ned Jarrett	'63 Ford	71.884	25.040	Charles Robinson
7	8	Joe Weatherly	'63 Mercury	71.827	25.060	Bud Moore
8	6	David Pearson	'63 Dodge	71.770	25.080	Cotton Owens
9	41	Richard Petty	'63 Plymouth	71.741	25.090	Petty Enterprises
10	5	Billy Wade	'63 Dodge	71.400	25.210	Cotton Owens

Failed to qualify: Bobby Keck (#57), Possum Jones (#05)

== Top 20 finishers ==
Pos	No.	Driver	Manufacturer	Laps	Laps led	Time/Status
1	28	Fred Lorenzen	Ford	500	421	3:42:16
2	21	Marvin Panch	Ford	499	0	+1 laps
3	8	Joe Weatherly	Mercury	497	0	+2 laps
4	6	David Pearson	Dodge	496	0	+4 laps
5	41	Richard Petty	Plymouth	496	0	+4 laps
6	5	Billy Wade	Dodge	495	0	+5 laps
7	22	Fireball Roberts	Ford	489	0	+11 laps
8	29	Nelson Stacy	Ford	488	0	+12 laps
9	47	Jack Smith	Plymouth	488	0	+12 laps
10	87	Buck Baker	Pontiac	477	0	+23 laps
11	36	Larry Thomas	Dodge	477	0	+23 laps
12	19	Cale Yarborough	Ford	474	0	+26 laps
13	62	Curtis Crider	Mercury	461	0	+39 laps
14	60	Bud Harless	Pontiac	461	0	+39 laps
15	09	Larry Manning	Chevrolet	459	0	+41 laps
16	86	Worth McMillion	Pontiac	447	0	+53 laps
17	67	Reb Wickersham	Pontiac	430	0	Terminal vehicle damage
18	34	Wendell Scott	Chevrolet	403	0	+97 laps
19	11	Ned Jarrett	Ford	362	0	Engine problem
20	99	Larry Frank	Ford	300	0	Vehicle overheated

Preceded by 1963 Capital City 300	NASCAR Grand National Series Season; 1963	Succeeded by 1963 untitled race at Dog Track Speedway

Preceded by 1962	Old Dominion 500 races 1963	Succeeded by 1964
