= 1965 World 600 =

Auto race held at Charlotte Motor Speedway in 1965

Race details
- Race 19 of 55 in the 1965 NASCAR Grand National Series season
- 1965 World 600 program cover
- Date: May 23, 1965
- Location: Charlotte Motor Speedway, Concord, North Carolina
- Course: Permanent racing facility
- Course length: 1.5 miles (2.4 km)
- Distance: 400 laps, 600 mi (965.606 km)
- Average speed: 121.722 mph (195.893 km/h)

Pole position
Driver	Fred Lorenzen	Holman-Moody

Most laps led
Driver	Fred Lorenzen	Holman-Moody
- Laps: 257

Winner
No. 28	Fred Lorenzen	Holman-Moody

The 1965 World 600, the 6th running of the event, was a NASCAR Grand National Series race held on May 23, 1965, at Charlotte Motor Speedway in Charlotte, North Carolina. Contested over 400 laps on the 1.5 mile (2.4 km) speedway, it was the 19th race of the 1965 NASCAR Grand National Series season. Fred Lorenzen of Holman-Moody won the race.

== Background ==
Charlotte Motor Speedway is a motorsports complex located in Concord, North Carolina, United States, 13 miles from Charlotte, North Carolina. The complex features a 1.5 mile (2.4 km) quad oval track that hosts NASCAR racing including the prestigious World 600 on Memorial Day weekend and the National 400. The speedway was built in 1959 by Bruton Smith and is considered the home track for NASCAR with many race teams located in the Charlotte area. The track is owned and operated by Speedway Motorsports Inc. (SMI).

== Race report ==
Dick Hutcherson managed to take the championship lead away from Ned Jarrett after this race.

Future international star Pedro Rodriguez finished fifth here in a factory Ford in a rare Grand National appearance. Marvin Panch crashed the Wood Brothers' Ford vehicle and finished in 33rd place. This was close to the time that they pitted the winning car of Jimmy Clark at the 1965 Indianapolis 500.

Notable crew chiefs at this race; Ray Fox, John Ervin, Jimmy Thomas and Herb Nab.

=== Final results ===
Fin	St	#	Driver	Sponsor	Make	Laps	Led	Status
1	1	28	Fred Lorenzen		'65 Ford	400	257	running
2	6	15	Earl Balmer		'64 Mercury	400	11	running
3	5	29	Dick Hutcherson		'65 Ford	397	0	running
4	14	88	Buddy Baker		'64 Dodge	392	0	running
5	12	51	Pedro Rodriguez		'65 Ford	391	0	running
6	19	4	Ned Setzer		'65 Chevrolet	382	0	running
7	30	27	Paul Lewis		'64 Ford	380	0	running
8	16	74	Donald Tucker		'63 Ford	352	0	running
9	23	44	Larry Hess		'64 Ford	348	0	running
10	24	86	Neil Castles		'65 Plymouth	343	0	running
11	29	37	Bub Strickler		'64 Ford	335	0	crash
12	36	68	Bob Derrington		'63 Ford	331	0	crash
13	38	53	Jimmy Helms		'63 Ford	321	0	running
14	44	3	LeeRoy Yarbrough		'65 Chevrolet	309	0	engine
15	41	66	Larry Manning		'63 Chevrolet	308	0	running
16	37	97	Henley Gray		'64 Ford	308	0	running
17	32	52	E.J. Trivette		'63 Chevrolet	302	0	running
18	2	16	Darel Dieringer		'64 Mercury	286	50	engine
19	28	56	Bill Morton		'63 Ford	283	0	engine
20	7	11	Ned Jarrett		'65 Ford	274	0	engine
21	18	90	Sonny Hutchins		'64 Ford	244	0	differential
22	4	7	Cale Yarborough		'65 Ford	232	0	crash
23	17	41	Jim Paschal		'65 Chevrolet	211	0	crash
24	9	26	Junior Johnson		'65 Ford	207	48	engine
25	22	67	Buddy Arrington		'64 Dodge	187	0	engine
26	43	70	Wendell Scott		'64 Ford	179	0	engine
27	27	63	Don Hume		'63 Ford	146	0	engine
28	33	19	J.T. Putney		'65 Chevrolet	142	0	crash
29	11	49	G.C. Spencer		'64 Ford	121	0	engine
30	10	76	Larry Frank		'64 Ford	120	33	ex. Manifold
31	15	23	Buren Skeen		'64 Ford	113	0	crash
32	25	00	Tom Pistone		'64 Ford	94	0	engine
33	3	21	Marvin Panch		'65 Ford	78	1	crash
34	34	25	Jabe Thomas		'64 Ford	73	0	crash
35	26	64	Elmo Langley		'64 Ford	68	0	clutch
36	39	62	Raymond Carter		'64 Dodge	58	0	differential
37	21	14	Bunkie Blackburn		'65 Plymouth	53	0	crankshaft
38	13	87	Buck Baker		'65 Chevrolet	33	0	engine
39	35	9	Roy Tyner		'64 Chevrolet	25	0	tappett
40	31	13	Doug Cooper		'65 Chevrolet	17	0	driveshaft
41	8	24	Sam McQuagg		'65 Ford	15	0	crash
42	40	20	Clyde Lynn		'64 Ford	13	0	crash
43	42	38	Wayne Smith		'65 Chevrolet	9	0	oil pressure
44	20	17	Junior Spencer		'64 Ford	9	0	oil leak
