= 1963 World 600 =

Auto race held at Charlotte Motor Speedway in 1963

Race details
- Race 26 of 55 in the 1963 NASCAR Grand National Series season
- 1963 World 600 program cover
- Date: June 2, 1963
- Location: Charlotte Motor Speedway, Concord, North Carolina
- Course: Permanent racing facility
- Course length: 1.5 miles (2.4 km)
- Distance: 400 laps, 600 mi (965.606 km)
- Average speed: 132.417 mph (213.105 km/h)

Pole position
Driver	Junior Johnson	

Most laps led
Driver	Junior Johnson	N/A
- Laps: 289

Winner
No. 28	Fred Lorenzen	

The 1963 World 600, the 4th running of the event, was a NASCAR Grand National Series race held on June 2, 1963 at Charlotte Motor Speedway in Charlotte, North Carolina. Contested over 400 laps on the 1.5 mile (2.4 km) speedway, it was the 26th race of the 1963 NASCAR Grand National Series season. Fred Lorenzen of Holman-Moody won the race.

Paul Clark and Banjo Matthews would depart from NASCAR after the race while Joe Weatherly took the championship lead from Richard Petty.

== Background ==
Charlotte Motor Speedway is a motorsports complex located in Concord, North Carolina, United States, 13 miles from Charlotte, North Carolina. The complex features a 1.5 miles (2.4 km) quad oval track that hosts NASCAR racing including the prestigious World 600 on Memorial Day weekend and the National 400. The speedway was built in 1959 by Bruton Smith and is considered the home track for NASCAR with many race teams located in the Charlotte area. The track is owned and operated by Speedway Motorsports Inc. (SMI).

=== World 600 ===
==== Race results ====
Fin	St	#	Driver	Make	Laps	Led	Status
1	2	28	Fred Lorenzen	'63 Ford	400	76	running
2	1	3	Junior Johnson	'63 Chevrolet	400	289	running
3	6	4	Rex White	'63 Chevrolet	398	1	running
4	7	8	Joe Weatherly	'63 Pontiac	397	0	running
5	23	6	David Pearson	'63 Dodge	396	0	running
6	5	29	Nelson Stacy	'63 Ford	395	0	running
7	3	21	Marvin Panch	'63 Ford	395	18	running
8	12	26	Darel Dieringer	'63 Mercury	394	0	running
9	15	25	G.C. Spencer	'63 Mercury	392	1	running
10	4	22	Fireball Roberts	'63 Ford	391	15	running
11	14	99	Bobby Isaac	'63 Ford	385	0	running
12	19	44	Tiny Lund	'63 Ford	384	0	running
13	10	0	Jimmy Pardue	'63 Ford	384	0	running
14	28	19	Larry Thomas	'63 Ford	373	0	running
15	27	60	Bob Cooper	'62 Pontiac	373	0	running
16	34	20	Emanuel Zervakis	'63 Ford	367	0	engine
17	9	13	Banjo Matthews	'63 Chevrolet	358	0	differential
18	25	48	Stick Elliott	'63 Plymouth	355	0	crash
19	36	09	Larry Manning	'62 Chevrolet	354	0	running
20	43	34	Wendell Scott	'62 Chevrolet	350	0	running
21	39	83	Worth McMillion	'62 Pontiac	350	0	running
22	30	97	Possum Jones	'62 Chevrolet	338	0	running
23	41	18	Cale Yarborough	'62 Pontiac	336	0	running
24	20	5	Billy Wade	'63 Dodge	335	0	differential
25	13	24	Larry Frank	'63 Mercury	321	0	bearing
26	37	1	E. J. Trivette	'62 Chevrolet	288	0	engine
27	32	50	T. C. Hunt	'62 Pontiac	264	0	engine
28	16	7	Bobby Johns	'63 Pontiac	259	0	piston
29	8	06	Bob Welborn	'63 Pontiac	253	0	engine
30	22	11	Ned Jarrett	'63 Ford	228	0	engine
31	40	86	Neil Castles	'62 Chrysler	200	0	engine
32	35	30	Bunkie Blackburn	'62 Chevrolet	194	0	engine
33	31	39	LeeRoy Yarbrough	'61 Pontiac	188	0	engine
34	24	41	Bob James	'63 Plymouth	111	0	fuel pump
35	29	74	Paul Clark	'62 Pontiac	96	0	engine
36	18	43	Richard Petty	'63 Plymouth	90	0	camshaft
37	38	56	Ed Livingston	'62 Ford	81	0	engine
38	44	2	Buddy Baker	'62 Pontiac	61	0	engine
39	26	54	Ralph Earnhardt	'63 Ford	59	0	crash
40	17	66	Johnny Allen	'63 Ford	53	0	crash
41	33	47	Jack Smith	'62 Plymouth	27	0	wheel
42	20	42	Jim Paschal	'63 Plymouth	24	0	crash
43	11	87	Buck Baker	'63 Pontiac	23	0	crash
44	42	62	Curtis Crider	'63 Mercury	2	0	withdrew

=== World 600 Qualifier ===
==== Race results ====
Pos	St	#	Driver	Team	Cae	Laps	Status	Led
1	2	30	Bunkie Blackburn	Fred Clark	CV	20	running	19
2	4	09	Larry Manning	Bob Adams	CV	20	running	0
3	5	1	E. J. Trivette	Jess Potter	CV	20	running	0
4	12	56	Ed Livingston	Mamie Reynolds	FR	20	running	0
5	7	83	Worth McMillion	Worth McMillion	PT	20	running	0
6	3	86	Neil Castles	Buck Baker	CY	19	running	0
7	1	18	Cale Yarborough	Toy Bolton	PT	19	running	1
8	13	62	Curtis Crider	Curtis Crider	MR	19	running	0
9	6	34	Wendell Scott	Wendell Scott	CV	18	running	0
10	15	2	Buddy Baker	Cliff Stewart	PT	17	running	0
11	8	67	Reb Wickersham	Reb Wickersham	PT	7	crash	0
12	9	02	Bob Cooper	Bob Cooper	PT	7	crash	0
13	10	75	Tom Cox	Robert Smith	PT	7	crash	0
14	11	23	Bill Widenhouse	Leland Colvin	PL	7	crash	0
15	14	38	Woodie Wilson	Mat DeMatthews	FR	2	oil leak	0
16	16	5	H. G. Rosier	H. G. Rosier	PT	0	did not start	0
