= Fred Lorenzen =

American racing driver (1934–2024)

- Born: Frederick Lorenzen Jr. December 30, 1934 Elmhurst, Illinois, U.S.
- Died: December 18, 2024 (aged 89) Illinois, U.S.

Championship titles
- USAC Stock Car (1958, 1959); Major victories World 600 (1963, 1965); Daytona 500 (1965)

AAA/USAC Stock Car career
- Years active: 1956–1959, 1964
- Championships: 2
- Best finish: 1st in 1958, 1959

NASCAR Cup Series career
- 158 races run over 12 years
- Best finish: 3rd (1963)
- First race: 1956 Race 11 (Langhorne)
- Last race: 1972 Old Dominion 500 (Martinsville)
- First win: 1961 Virginia 500 (Martinsville)
- Last win: 1967 Daytona Qualifier #2 (Daytona)
Wins	Top tens	Poles
26	84	32

Frederick Lorenzen Jr. (December 30, 1934 – December 18, 2024), nicknamed "the Golden Boy", "Fast Freddie", "the Elmhurst Express" and "Fearless Freddy", was an American NASCAR driver from Elmhurst, Illinois. Active from 1958 to 1972, he won 26 races including 1965 Daytona 500.

== Early life ==
Fred Lorenzen was 15 years of age when he and his Elmhurst, Illinois, friends competed in a contest to see who could flip a 1937 Plymouth over first by cranking it around in circles. Lorenzen claimed to be the victor of that tourney.

== NASCAR ==
=== Early career ===
After graduating from high school, Lorenzen began racing modifieds and late models, and made his NASCAR debut in 1956 at Langhorne Speedway, finishing 26th after suffering a broken fuel pump, winning $25. He moved to a USAC stock car, and won the 1958 and 1959 championships driving his Talarico Bros. built Chevrolet.

== The Holman Moody Years ==
On Christmas Eve 1960, Lorenzen received a phone call from team owner Ralph Moody. Moody asked Lorenzen about becoming his team's lead driver. Lorenzen accepted, although curious as to what he'd done to fulfill Moody's criteria to be part of his team.

In 1961, Lorenzen began winning races in what would eventually become a remarkable career. From 1961 until 1966, Lorenzen dominated NASCAR like few drivers could winning many prestigious races and beating the top drivers of the time.

In his maiden season with Holman Moody, Lorenzen won the Grand National 200 at Martinsville; the Rebel 300 at Darlington and the Festival 250 at Atlanta.

== Lorenzen's winning streak (1962–1967) ==
In 1962, Lorenzen won the Atlanta 500 and a race at Augusta Speedway. The 1962 Ford was troubled at the start of the season by inferior aerodynamics. Ford introduced a Starlift option for the convertible that rectified this issue. The Atlanta 500 was the only race it was used. NASCAR banned it since it didn't completely cover and was used only for a racing advantage.

In 1963, Lorenzen soared to the top and became the top money-maker and the first to break the $100,000 barrier in one season. In that year, Lorenzen won: the Atlanta 500, the World 600; the Volunteer 500, the Western North Carolina 500; the Mountaineer 300 and the Old Dominion 500 bringing his total winnings to $122,000.

In 1964, Lorenzen won the Southeastern 500 at Bristol; the Atlanta 500; the Gwyn Staley 400 at North Wilkesboro; the Virginia 500 at Martinsville; the Rebel 300 at Darlington; the Volunteer 500; the Old Dominion 500, and the National 400 at Charlotte Motor Speedway; five of those races are current "classics" on the NASCAR Cup Series as of 2025. He also won the USAC-sanctioned Yankee 300.

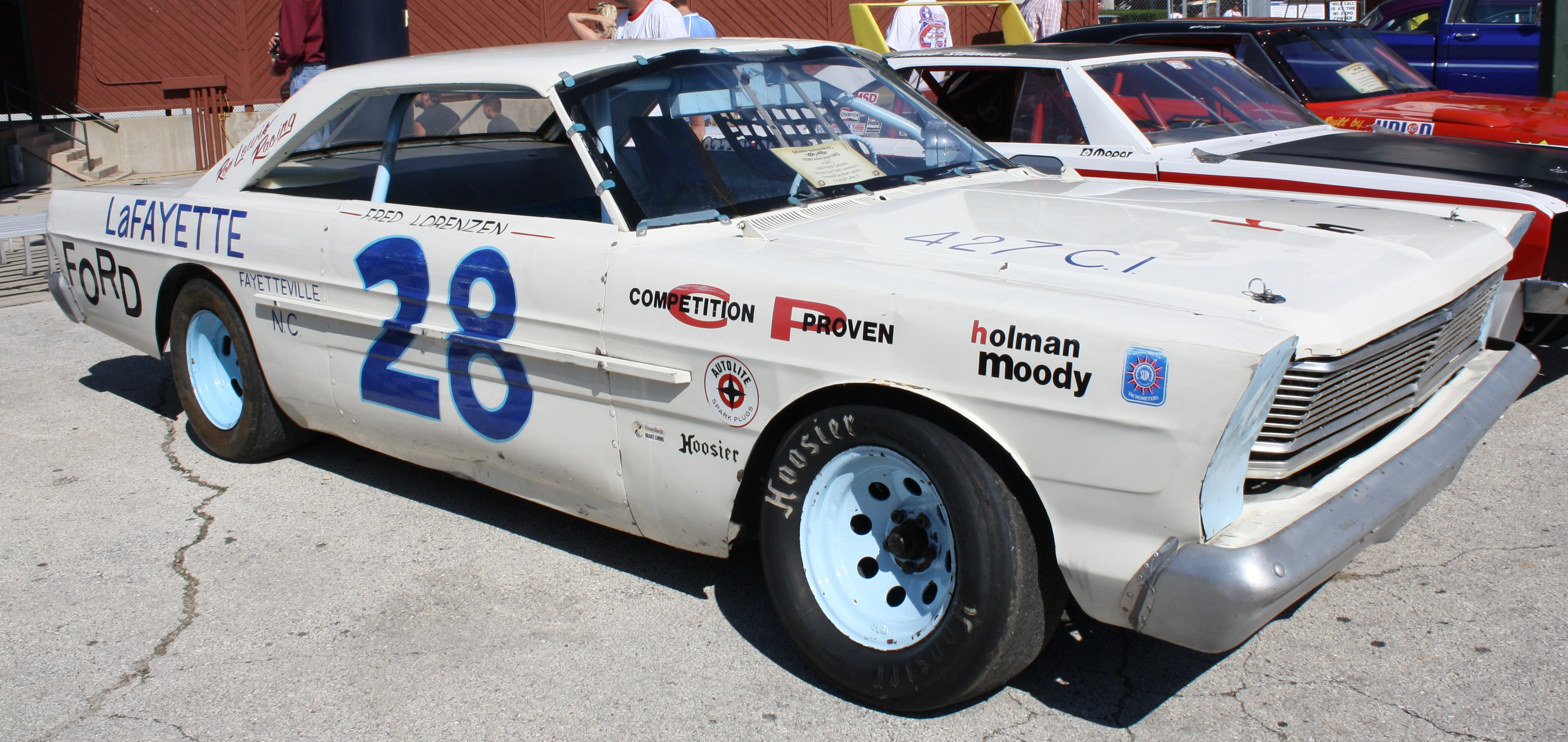
Lorenzen's 1965 Ford Galaxie replica

In 1965 Lorenzen won the Daytona 500; the Virginia 500; the World 600, and the National 400.

In 1966 Lorenzen won the Old Dominion 500 and the American 500 at Rockingham, North Carolina. In 1967 Lorenzen won the Daytona 500 Qualifier (until 1971, the races currently known as the Bluegreen Vacations Duels were points-paying races).

Lorenzen compiled 26 wins, that made him the one of dominant drivers of NASCAR during a significant portion of the sport's early golden era.

=== The Yellow Banana ===
In one race in 1966 at Atlanta Motor Speedway, Lorenzen drove a Junior Johnson-owned No. 26 Ford due to the Ford boycott of NASCAR for much of the 1966 season, and it is still one of the most talked about vehicles in NASCAR Grand National Competition to this day. The front end of the car was sloped downward, the roofline was lowered, the side windows were narrowed and the windshield was lowered in an aerodynamic position, and the tail was kicked up. Several rival drivers referred to it as "The Yellow Banana," "Junior's Joke," and "The Magnafluxed Monster." Even though it was against the rules NASCAR allowed the car to compete and Lorenzen crashed while leading the Dixie 500 on the 139th lap. One pit crew member said after the incident "No wonder" he said, "I ain't never seen anybody who could drive a banana at 150 mile an hour." NASCAR let this (very) illegal car run in only one race, in an attempt to bring up attendance, which had suffered due to the Ford boycott.

=== Comeback ===
Lorenzen came back in 1970, driving a Dodge Daytona prepared by Ray Fox in the World 600 (now the Coca-Cola 600), but dropped out while leading on lap 252 of 400 due to engine issues, running in a few more events that year, including substituting for LeeRoy Yarbrough in the Junior Johnson No. 98 Ford Torino Talladega in that year's Southern 500, as Yarbrough had a prior Indy car commitment. In 1971, he moved over to the Ray Nichels/Paul Goldsmith owned No. 99 Plymouth, sponsored by STP. He left that team part way through the season, and was badly injured in a practice crash while trying to drive for the Wood Brothers prior to the Southern 500. In 1972, he hooked up with Hoss Ellington driving a Chevrolet Monte Carlo, to little success. His last start came at the 1972 Old Dominion 500 at Martinsville Speedway.

== Legacy ==
In his peak from 1962–65, Lorenzen was one the top drivers in NASCAR. On the super speedways, Lorenzen defeated all of his competition to compile many wins in major races. Racing for money instead of points, Lorenzen never competed for the annual Grand National championship, yet he won big races that made him one of the faces of the sport during early golden years. Lorenzen's fans waited for a long time for Lorenzen's career to be recognized with his induction into the NASCAR Hall of Fame.

== Later life and death ==
Lorenzen remained in assisted living in a suburb of Chicago surrounded by his family. He died from complications of dementia on December 18, 2024, at the age of 89.

On October 20, 2026, it was revealed that Lorenzen was the first ever driver diagnosed with chronic traumatic encephalopathy (CTE). His children Chris and Amanda, who were born after he ended his racing career, also revealed that they first noticed changes in Lorenzen when they were still in school. He became repetitive and easily irritated. His family sensed something was seriously wrong in 2006 when he acted very confused at his daughter's wedding in Mexico and tried to leave multiple times during the ceremonies. In 2009 he suffered a fall and required the use of a wheelchair from then on. His son estimated that his necessary 24-hour-care cost the family around 200.000$ per year until his death.

== Awards ==
- Inducted in the Motorsports Hall of Fame of America in 2001.
- Named one of NASCAR's 50 Greatest Drivers in 1998.
- Inducted into the NASCAR Hall of Fame in January 2015.
- Named one of NASCAR's 75 Greatest Drivers in 2023.

== Quotes ==
- "When NASCAR lost Fireball Roberts it was like Santa Claus doesn't exist at Christmas and it just took everything out of the race"—Thoughts on Fireball Roberts' death.

== Motorsports career results ==
=== NASCAR ===
(key) (Bold – Pole position awarded by qualifying time. Italics – Pole position earned by points standings or practice time. * – Most laps led.)

==== Grand National Series ====
NASCAR Grand National Series results
Year	Team	No.	Make	1	2	3	4	5	6	7	8	9	10	11	12	13	14	15	16	17	18	19	20	21	22	23	24	25	26	27	28	29	30	31	32	33	34	35	36	37	38	39	40	41	42	43	44	45	46	47	48	49	50	51	52	53	54	55	56	57	58	59	60	61	62	NGNC	Pts	Ref
1956	Fred Lorenzen	50	Chevy	HCY	CLT	WSS	PBS	ASF	DAB	PBS	WIL	ATL	NWS	LAN; 26	RCH																																																			120th	-	
1956	Fred Lorenzen	150	Chevy													CLB; 20	CON; 22	GPS; 21	HCY; 20	HBO	MAR; 24	LIN	CLT	POR	EUR	NYF	MER	MAS	CLT	MCF	POR	AWS	RSP	PIF	CSF	CHI; 20	CCF	MGY	OKL	ROA; DNQ	OBS	SAN	NOR	PIF	MYB	POR	DAR	CSH	CLT	LAN	POR	CLB	HBO	NWP	CLT	CCF	MAR	HCY	WIL							120th	-	
1960	Fred Lorenzen	28	Ford	CLT	CLB	DAY; 3	DAY	DAY; 8	CLT	NWS	PHO	CLB	MAR; 18	HCY	WIL	BGS	GPS	AWS	DAR	PIF	HBO	RCH	HMS	CLT; 41	BGS	DAY; 3	HEI	MAB	MBS	ATL; 5	BIR	NSV	AWS	PIF	CLB	SBO	BGS	DAR; 28	HCY	CSF	GSP	HBO	MAR; 12	NWS	CLT; 50	RCH	ATL; 10																			15th	6764	
1961	Tubby Gonzales	80	Ford	CLT	JSP	DAY	DAY	DAY; 4	PIF	AWS	HMS																																																							19th	9316	
1961	Holman-Moody	28	Ford									ATL; 33	GPS	HBO	BGS	MAR; 1	NWS; 19	CLB	HCY	RCH	MAR; 11*	**DAR**; 1	**CLT**; 5*	CLT	RSD	ASP	CLT; 35	PIF	BIR	GPS	BGS	NOR	HAS	STR	DAY; 2	ATL; 1*	CLB	MBS	**BRI**; 33	NSV	BGS	AWS	RCH	SBO	DAR; 29	HCY	RCH	CSF	ATL; 36	MAR; 18	NWS; DNQ	CLT; 31	BRI	GPS	HBO											19th	9316	
1962	Holman-Moody	28	Ford	CON	AWS	DAY; 24	DAY	DAY; 5	CON; 16	AWS	SVH	HBO	RCH	CLB	NWS; 2	GPS	MBS	**MAR**; 4	BGS	BRI; 34	RCH	HCY	CON	**DAR**; 3	PIF		ATL; 1	BGS	AUG	RCH	SBO	DAY; 24	CLB	ASH	GPS	AUG	SVH	MBS	BRI; 2	CHT	NSV	HUN	AWS	STR	BGS	PIF	VAL	DAR; 24					MAR; 28	**NWS**; 6	CLT; 3	ATL; 5										7th	17554	
1962	Holman-Moody	0	Ford																							CLT; 3																																								7th	17554	
1962	Holman-Moody	26	Ford																																														HCY; 20	RCH; 3	DTS	AUG; 1														7th	17554	
1963	Wood Brothers Racing	21	Ford	BIR	GGS	THS	RSD; 22	DAY																																																										3rd	29684	
1963	Holman-Moody	28	Ford						**DAY**; 3	DAY; 2	PIF	AWS	HBO	ATL; 1	HCY	**BRI**; 2*	AUG					MAR; 5*	**NWS**; 2	CLB	THS	DAR; 30	ODS	RCH	CLT; 1	BIR	ATL; 2	DAY; 2	MBS	SVH	DTS	BGS	ASH	OBS; 3	BRR; 2	**BRI**; 1*	GPS	NSV; 18	CLB	AWS; 1*	PIF	BGS	**ONA**; 1*	**DAR**; 3	HCY; 9	RCH; 5	MAR; 1*	DTS; 5	**NWS**; 2	**THS**; 5*	CLT; 2	SBO	HBO	RSD; 32								3rd	29684	
1963	McKinney Racing	44	Ford															RCH; 22	GPS; 19	SBO	BGS; 6																																													3rd	29684	
1964	Holman-Moody	28	Ford	CON	**AUG**; 28	JSP	SVH	**RSD**; 17	DAY	DAY; 17	DAY; 31	RCH	BRI; 1*	GPS	BGS	**ATL**; 1*	AWS	HBO	PIF	CLB	**NWS**; 1*	**MAR**; 1*	SVH	**DAR**; 1*	LGY	HCY	SBO	CLT; 4	GPS	ASH	ATL; 31	CON	NSV	CHT	BIR	VAL	PIF	DAY; 34	ODS	OBS	BRR	ISP	GLN	LIN	BRI; 1	NSV	MBS	AWS	DTS	ONA	CLB	BGS	STR	DAR; 22	HCY	RCH	ODS	HBO	**MAR**; 1*	SVH	NWS; 2	CLT; 1	HAR	AUG	JAC	13th	18098	
1965	Holman-Moody	28	Ford	RSD; 24	DAY	DAY; 2	DAY; 1	PIF	AWS	RCH	HBO	ATL; 16	GPS	NWS; 7	MAR; 1*	CLB	BRI; 27	**DAR**; 25	LGY	BGS	HCY	**CLT**; 1*	CCF	ASH	HAR	NSV	BIR	**ATL**; 23	GPS	MBS	VAL	DAY; 31	ODS	OBS	ISP	GLN	**BRI**; 20	NSV	CCF	AWS	SMR	PIF	AUG	CLB	DTS	BLV	BGS	DAR; 11	HCY	LIN	ODS	RCH	MAR; 21	**NWS**; 19	**CLT**; 1	HBO	CAR; 27	DTS								13th	18448	
1966	Holman-Moody	28	Ford	AUG	RSD	DAY; 5	DAY	DAY; 4	CAR; 26	BRI; 22	ATL; 2	HCY	CLB	GPS	BGS	NWS	MAR	DAR	LGY	MGR	MON	RCH	CLT	DTS	ASH	PIF	SMR	AWS	BLV	GPS	DAY	ODS	BRR	OXF	FON	ISP	BRI	SMR	NSV						DAR; 5	HCY	RCH	HBO	MAR; 1	NWS; 23*	**CLT**; 25	**CAR**; 1*														23rd	12454	
1966	Holman-Moody	26	Ford																																					ATL; 23	CLB	AWS	BLV	BGS																						23rd	12454	
1967	Holman-Moody	28	Ford	AUG	RSD; 15	DAY	DAY; 1	DAY; 2	AWS	BRI; 15	GPS	BGS	ATL; 28	CLB	HCY	NWS	MAR	SVH	RCH	DAR	BLV	LGY	CLT	ASH	MGR	SMR	BIR	CAR	GPS	MGY	DAY	TRN	OXF	FDA	ISP	BRI	SMR	NSV	ATL	BGS	CLB	SVH	DAR	HCY	RCH	BLV	HBO	MAR	NWS	CLT	CAR	AWS														29th	9268	
1970	Fox Racing	28	Dodge	RSD	DAY	DAY	DAY	RCH	CAR	SVH	ATL	BRI	TAL	NWS	CLB	DAR	BLV	LGY	CLT; 24	SMR	MAR	MCH	RSD	HCY	KPT	GPS	DAY; 32	AST	TPN	TRN	BRI; 27	SMR	NSV	**ATL**; 22	CLB	ONA	MCH	TAL	BGS	SBO																										54th	231	
1970	Junior Johnson & Associates	98	Ford																																						DAR; 33	HCY	RCH	DOV	NCF	NWS																				54th	231	
1970	Fox Racing	3	Dodge																																												CLT; 3	MAR	MGR	CAR	LGY															54th	231	
1971	Nichels Engineering	99	Plymouth	RSD	DAY; 5	DAY	DAY; 5	ONT; 30	RCH	**CAR**; 4	HCY	BRI	ATL; 35	CLB	GPS	SMR	NWS	MAR; 20	DAR; 18	SBO	TAL; 5	ASH	KPT	CLT; 5	DOV; 2	MCH; 7	RSD	HOU	GPS	DAY; 7	BRI	AST	ISP	TRN	NSV	ATL	BGS	ONA	MCH	TAL; 4	CLB	HCY	DAR	MAR	CLT	DOV; 31	CAR	MGR	RCH	NWS	TWS															45th	611	

==== Winston Cup Series ====
NASCAR Winston Cup Series results
Year	Team	No.	Make	1	2	3	4	5	6	7	8	9	10	11	12	13	14	15	16	17	18	19	20	21	22	23	24	25	26	27	28	29	30	31	NWCC	Pts	Ref
1972	Ellington Racing	28	Ford	RSD	DAY	RCH	ONT	CAR	ATL	BRI	DAR; 29	NWS	MAR	TAL; 4	CLT; 18	DOV	MCH	RSD	TWS	DAY	BRI														39th	1333.5	
1972	Donlavey Racing	90	Ford																			TRN; 4													39th	1333.5	
1972	Ellington Racing	28	Chevy																				ATL; 6	TAL; 20	MCH	NSV	DAR; 4	RCH	DOV	MAR; 27	NWS	CLT	CAR	TWS	39th	1333.5	

===== Daytona 500 =====
Year	Team	Manufacturer	Start	Finish
1960	Fred Lorenzen	Ford	5	8
1961	Tubby Gonzales	Ford	45	4
1962	Holman-Moody	Ford	34	5
1963	Holman-Moody	Ford	2	2
1964	Holman-Moody	Ford	34	31
1965	Holman-Moody	Ford	4	**1**
1966	Holman-Moody	Ford	9	4
1967	Holman-Moody	Ford	4	2
1971	Nichels Engineering	Plymouth	9	5

Sporting positions
Preceded by Jerry Unser	USAC Stock Car Champion; 1958–1959	Succeeded by Norm Nelson

Achievements
Preceded by Richard Petty	Daytona 500 Winner; 1965	Succeeded by Richard Petty
