= 1964 World 600 =

Auto race held at Charlotte Motor Speedway in 1964

Race details
- Race 25 of 62 in the 1964 NASCAR Grand National Series season
- 1964 World 600 program cover
- Date: May 24, 1964
- Official name: World 600
- Location: Charlotte Motor Speedway, Concord, North Carolina
- Course: Permanent racing facility
- Course length: 1.500 miles (2.414 km)
- Distance: 400 laps, 600 mi (965.5 km)
- Weather: Temperatures between 64.9 °F (18.3 °C) and 82.0 °F (27.8 °C); wind speeds of 10.10 miles per hour (16.25 km/h)
- Average speed: 125.772 miles per hour (202.410 km/h)
- Attendance: 66,311

Pole position
Driver	Jimmy Pardue	Burton-Robinson
- Time: 149.64 seconds

Most laps led
Driver	Jim Paschal	Petty Enterprises
- Laps: 126

Winner
No. 41	Jim Paschal	Petty Enterprises

Television in the United States
- Network: NBC
- Announcers: Unknown

The 1964 World 600, the fifth running of the event, was a NASCAR Grand National Series event that took place on May 24, 1964, at Charlotte Motor Speedway in Concord, North Carolina.

There was a 30-mile consolation race the day before this to determine the final 14 starters.

The crash that hospitalized Fireball Roberts before he died of pneumonia 6 weeks later.

Bobby Keck finished 14th in that race (in a 1963 Ford) but he was unable to start the 600 and his car was withdrawn, with Pete Stewart taking the last starting position as the first alternate starter. Major Melton finished 16th in that race driving a 1963 Dodge and was the second alternate.

== Background ==
Charlotte Motor Speedway is a motorsports complex located in Concord, North Carolina, 13 miles from Charlotte, North Carolina. The complex features a 1.5 miles (2.4 km) quad oval track that hosts NASCAR racing including the prestigious Coca-Cola 600 on Memorial Day weekend and the Sprint All-Star Race, as well as the Bank of America 500. The speedway was built in 1959 by Bruton Smith and Curtis Turner and is considered the home track for NASCAR with many race teams located in the Charlotte area. The track is owned and operated by Speedway Motorsports Inc. (SMI) with Marcus G. Smith (son of Bruton Smith) as track president.

== Race report ==
The race covered four hundred laps of the paved oval track spanning 1.500 miles (2.414 km). It took four hours, forty-six minutes, and fourteen seconds. Seven cautions slowed the race for 48 laps. The race averaged 125.772 miles per hour (202.410 km/h) and 144.346 miles per hour (232.302 km/h) was the pole position speed. The attendance was 66,311. Notable crew chiefs for this race included Bud Moore, Herman Beam, Ralph Gray, Glen Wood, Banjo Matthews and Dale Inman.

Miss Linda Vaughn was selected to be Pontiac's representative at this event; she was an adolescent during that time.

Jim Paschal defeated Richard Petty by more than four laps. Other notable drivers included: Ralph Earnhardt, Roy Tyner, Fireball Roberts, Elmo Langley, and Buddy Baker. The top two finishers were teammates at Petty Enterprises (now Richard Petty Motorsports). Jim Paschal would receive $24,785 ($257,291 when adjusted for inflation) in prize money after becoming the only driver to finish all 400 laps of the race. Pete Stewart was rewarded with $600 ($6,229 when adjusted for inflation) for finishing only one lap; resulting in a last place finish. Jimmy Pardue started in pole position while the winner started in 12th place.

=== Qualifying ===
Grid	No.	Driver	Manufacturer
1	54	Jimmy Pardue	'64 Plymouth
2	28	Fred Lorenzen	'64 Ford
3	26	Bobby Isaac	'64 Dodge
4	25	Paul Goldsmith	'64 Plymouth
5	43	Richard Petty	'64 Plymouth
6	21	Marvin Panch	'64 Ford
7	16	Darel Dieringer	'64 Mercury
8	11	Ned Jarrett	'64 Ford
9	27	Junior Johnson	'64 Ford
10	6	David Pearson	'64 Dodge
11	22	Fireball Roberts	'64 Ford
12	41	Jim Paschal	'64 Plymouth
13	4	Rex White	'64 Mercury
14	1	Billy Wade	'64 Mercury
15	03	LeeRoy Yarbrough	'64 Dodge
16	5	Larry Thomas	'64 Dodge
17	3	Buck Baker	'64 Dodge
18	19	Cale Yarborough	'64 Ford
19	2	Ken Rush	'63 Pontiac
20	95	Ken Spikes	'64 Plymouth

=== Death of Fireball Roberts ===
Fireball Roberts was involved in a crash while trying to avoid Junior Johnson and Ned Jarrett's crash on lap 7. Roberts was sent to Charlotte hospital. While he was not seriously injured by the crash itself, Roberts was trapped and engulfed in a blazing inferno as his fuel tank exploded, while his ankle became pinned under the dashboard and caught by either the clutch or brake pedal. The death would have occurred at the speedway if Jarrett hadn't pulled Roberts out of the fire. He died on July 2 of that year; leaving behind a wife (Doris Roberts) and a young daughter (Pamela Jane Roberts Trivette). Jarrett would go up to Roberts, and Roberts, who was uninjured and conscious, told Jarrett "Oh my God, Ned, help me! I'm on fire!" after being immersed in flames, as a result of the crash.

Before the fatal accident, Roberts was going to announce his retirement from the NASCAR Cup Series after the race to work as a spokesperson for a beer company. Fireball, as he was known to his racing fans and to his fellow drivers, was the first superstar of the superspeedway era.

Doctors ultimately blamed his death on pneumonia and he spent the last 39 days of his life at Charlotte Memorial Hospital (now Carolinas Medical Center) in extremely critical condition. The entire week from May 24 through May 30, 1964, ultimately became one of the darkest weeks in motorsports history as Eddie Sachs and Dave MacDonald were both killed in that year's Indianapolis 500. Actual home video footage of the accident was being recorded as the race occurred. The race would be televised tape delayed as a 30 minute broadcast on NBC. Roberts' body was eventually delivered to his burial crypt in Daytona Beach, Florida. One of the quotes that came in an earlier race sometime prior to his death was "I fear fire the most!"

Numerous safety innovations came about as a result of Roberts' death including the fire suit, as some drivers still raced wearing jeans and t-shirts, as well as a specialized fuel cell for racing. These inventions would first see usage at the 1964 Firecracker 400; just two days after Roberts' death.

== Finishing order ==
Section reference:

POS	ST	#	DRIVER	SPONSOR / OWNER	CAR	LAPS	MONEY	STATUS	LED
1	12	41	Jim Paschal	Petty Enterprises	'64 Plymouth	400	24785	running	126
2	5	43	Richard Petty	Petty Enterprises	'64 Plymouth	396	10455	running	0
3	13	4	Rex White	Bud Moore	'64 Mercury	393	8095	running	0
4	2	28	Fred Lorenzen	LaFayette (Holman-Moody Racing)	'64 Ford	393	6425	running	65
5	14	1	Billy Wade	Bud Moore	'64 Mercury	390	4050	running	0
6	33	49	G.C. Spencer	G.C. Spencer	'64 Chevrolet	376	2950	running	0
7	31	76	Larry Frank	Larry Frank	'63 Ford	364	2650	running	0
8	10	6	David Pearson	Cotton Owens	'64 Dodge	363	2085	running	1
9	40	34	Wendell Scott	Wendell Scott	'63 Ford	359	1775	running	0
10	24	20	Jack Anderson	Jack Anderson	'63 Ford	358	1500	running	0
11	26	02	Curtis Crider	Curtis Crider	'63 Mercury	358	1450	running	0
12	21	46	J.T. Putney	Walt Hunter	'62 Chevrolet	358	1325	running	0
13	7	16	Darel Dieringer	Bill Stroppe	'64 Mercury	344	1250	engine	0
14	37	83	Worth McMillion	Worth McMillion	'62 Pontiac	340	1200	running	0
15	32	60	Doug Cooper	Bob Cooper	'63 Ford	338	1350	running	0
16	41	9	Roy Tyner	Roy Tyner	'64 Chevrolet	329	925	running	0
17	42	68	Bob Derrington	Bob Derrington	'63 Ford	305	825	running	0
18	25	42	Bunkie Blackburn	Casper Hensley	'62 Pontiac	255	850	rear end	0
19	4	25	Paul Goldsmith	Ray Nichels	'64 Plymouth	253	1915	engine	123
20	17	3	Buck Baker	Ray Fox	'64 Dodge	238	990	engine	24
21	30	82	Bill McMahan	Casper Hensley	'64 Pontiac	231	625	clutch	0
22	20	95	Ken Spikes	Ken Spikes	'64 Plymouth	217	625	flagged	0
23	16	5	Larry Thomas	Cotton Owens	'64 Dodge	199	600	axle	0
24	1	54	Jimmy Pardue	Burton-Robinson (Charles Robinson)	'64 Plymouth	195	1280	engine	43
25	3	26	Bobby Isaac	Ray Nichels	'64 Dodge	169	775	engine mount	10
26	15	03	LeeRoy Yarbrough	Ray Fox	'64 Dodge	151	620	pinion b	8
27	23	18	Stick Elliott	Toy Bolton	'63 Pontiac	137	600	engine	0
28	18	19	Cale Yarborough	Herman Beam	'64 Ford	117	650	crash	0
29	6	21	Marvin Panch	Wood Brothers	'64 Ford	52	625	crash	0
30	28	09	Roy Mayne	Bob Adams	'62 Chevrolet	50	625	oil leak	0
31	19	2	Ken Rush	Cliff Stewart	'63 Pontiac	28	625	ignition	0
32	27	39	Mark Hurley	Mark Hurley	'63 Ford	11	625	transmission	0
33	8	11	Ned Jarrett	Courtesy Ford (Bondy Long)	'64 Ford	7	700	crash	0
34	9	27	Junior Johnson	Banjo Matthews	'64 Ford	7	700	crash	0
35	11	22	Fireball Roberts	Young Ford (Holman-Moody Racing)	'64 Ford	7	650	crash (fatal)	0
36	22	87	Buddy Baker	J.C. Parker	'63 Dodge	6	625	overheating	0
37	35	70	Ralph Earnhardt	Paul Clayton	'62 Pontiac	5	675	engine	0
38	36	88	Neil Castles	Buck Baker	'62 Chrysler	4	650	radiator	0
39	43	86	Jimmy Helms	Buck Baker	'62 Chrysler	4	625	oil line	0
40	34	01	Bob Cooper	Curtis Crider	'63 Mercury	4	700	radiator	0
41	39	40	Bud Harless	Fred Harless	'62 Pontiac	3	650	engine	0
42	29	64	Elmo Langley	John Berejoski	'63 Ford	1	625	engine	0
43	38	52	E.J. Trivette	Jess Potter	'62 Chevrolet	1	650	engine	0
44	44	84	Pete Stewart	Pete Stewart	'63 Pontiac	1	600	con rod	0

== Timeline ==
Section reference:

- Start of race: Jimmy Pardue has the pole position to begin the event.
- Lap 3: Bud Harless didn't race for long before his vehicle's engine could not handle the pressure anymore.
- Lap 5: Ralph Earnhardt ruined his engine.
- Lap 6: Buddy Baker managed to overheat his vehicle.
- Lap 7: Ned Jarrett, Junior Johnson, and Fireball Roberts were jointly involved in a terminal crash.
- Lap 11: Mark Hurley managed to bust his vehicle's transmission.
- Lap 28: The ignition on Ken Rush's vehicle stopped working.
- Lap 34: Bobby Isaac took over the lead from Jimmy Pardue.
- Lap 44: Paul Goldsmith took over the lead from Bobby Isaac.
- Lap 50: Roy Mayne's vehicle had an oil leak.
- Lap 52: Marvin Panch had a terminal crash.
- Lap 60: LeeRoy Yarbrough took over the lead from Paul Goldsmith.
- Lap 67: Paul Goldsmith took over the lead from LeeRoy Yarbrough.
- Lap 70: Jimmy Pardue took over the lead from Paul Goldsmith.
- Lap 80: Paul Goldsmith took over the lead from Jimmy Pardue.
- Lap 117: Cale Yarborough had a terminal crash.
- Lap 122: LeeRoy Yarbrough took over the lead from Paul Goldsmith.
- Lap 123: David Pearson took over the lead from LeeRoy Yarbrough.
- Lap 124: Buck Baker took over the lead from David Pearson.
- Lap 137: Stick Elliott fell out with engine failure.
- Lap 148: Paul Goldsmith took over the lead from Buck Baker.
- Lap 169: The engine mount on Bobby Isaac's vehicle was giving him problems.
- Lap 189: Fred Lorenzen took over the lead from Paul Goldsmith.
- Lap 195: Jimmy Pardue fell out with engine failure.
- Lap 199: The axle on Larry Thomas' vehicle forced him out of the race.
- Lap 217: Ken Spikes' was disqualified from the race by virtue of a black flag.
- Lap 223: Paul Goldsmith took over the lead from Fred Lorenzen.
- Lap 231: Problems with the vehicle's clutch forced Bill McMahan to leave the race prematurely.
- Lap 238: Buck Baker fell out with engine failure.
- Lap 253: Paul Goldsmith fell out with engine failure.
- Lap 254: Fred Lorenzen took over the lead from Paul Goldsmith.
- Lap 255: The rear end came loose off of Bunkie Blackburn's vehicle.
- Lap 275: Jim Paschal took over the lead from Fred Lorenzen.
- Lap 344: Darel Dieringer fell out with engine failure.
- Finish: Jim Paschal was officially declared the winner of the event.

Preceded by 1964 South Boston Speedway	NASCAR Grand National Races; 1964	Succeeded by 1964 Pickens 200

Preceded by 1963	World 600 races 1964	Succeeded by 1965
