= Coca-Cola 600 =

Auto race held in Charlotte, US

NASCAR Cup Series
- Venue: Charlotte Motor Speedway
- Location: Concord, North Carolina, United States
- Corporate sponsor: Coca-Cola
- First race: 1960
- Distance: 600 mi (965.606 km)
- Laps: 400; All 4 stages: 100 each
- Previous names: World 600 (1960–1984); Coca-Cola World 600 (1985); Coca-Cola 600 (1986–2001, 2003–present); Coca-Cola Racing Family 600 (2002)
- Most wins (driver): Darrell Waltrip (5)
- Most wins (team): Hendrick Motorsports (12)
- Most wins (manufacturer): Chevrolet (27)

Circuit information
- Surface: Asphalt
- Length: 1.5 mi (2.4 km)
- Turns: 4

The Coca-Cola 600, originally the World 600, is an annual 600-mile (970 km) NASCAR Cup Series points race held at the Charlotte Motor Speedway in Concord, North Carolina, on the fourth or last Sunday of May and during Memorial Day weekend. It is the longest race on NASCAR's schedule. It is unique for having track conditions that change throughout the race due to the race having a day to night transition (if the race occurs on schedule with no delays or postponements). The race starts around 6 p.m. when the track is bathed in sunlight for about the first third of the race. Roughly the second third happens at dusk, and about the final third of the race occurs at night under the lights.

The race is run later on the same day as the Indianapolis 500 of the IndyCar Series, with multiple drivers having performed or attempted Double Duty, competing in both races. No driver has ever won both races, either on the same day or across their career.

The NASCAR event is held on the last weekend of May (also known as "the greatest day/weekend in motorsports" due to it being one of the largest weekends in auto racing). The NASCAR race occurs last on the same Sunday after Formula One's Canadian Grand Prix (formerly the Monaco Grand Prix) and the IndyCar Series' Indianapolis 500.

Daniel Suárez is the defending winner of the Coca-Cola 600.

== Track origin ==
In the spring of 1959, Curtis Turner returned to Charlotte, North Carolina, after viewing Bill France Sr.'s Daytona International Speedway and had an idea of building a race track in the surrounding area. Turner thought he could borrow enough money to build a $750,000 track with 45,000 permanent seats on his property in Cabarrus County, North Carolina. Afterward, he learned that a group led by Bruton Smith had a similar idea to build a track near Pineville.

Smith and Turner formed an alliance to build the track, and they signed a contract with NASCAR to run a 600-mile event on Memorial Day. Once the construction crew broke ground, they found a layer of granite under the topsoil, making the construction costs raise. The area for the first turn alone used $70,000 worth of dynamite, ballooning Turner's $750,000 construction plan to nearly two million dollars. In the spring of 1960, Turner begged for a six-week postponement of the race after a snowstorm delayed the concrete pouring.

With two weeks remaining until the inaugural race, the paving subcontractor threatened to quit the job due to lack of payment. To keep him there, Turner and one of his friends threatened the subcontractor with a shotgun and a revolver to ensure the track's backstretch would be completed. The first event at the newly completed Charlotte Motor Speedway was held on June 19, 1960.

== History ==
The event began as an attempt by NASCAR to stage a Memorial Day weekend event to compete with the open-wheel Indianapolis 500. It was not until 1974, however, that both races competed head-to-head on the same day, due to Indianapolis' policy of not racing on Sundays prior to that. Before 1974, the two races were held on different days of the week, and on a few occasions, some drivers drove in both. They continued even after the Coca-Cola 600 was moved to the same day, albeit to a lesser degree. The first World 600 was held on June 16 due to construction delays of the completion of Charlotte Motor Speedway. The 2009 race, postponed by rain from its original May 24 date, was the first race to occur on Memorial Day itself.

After the installation of lights in 1992, fans asked circuit management to start the race later in the day because of the notorious North Carolina heat and humidity. They wanted to follow The Winston's popularity the previous week and switch the race to a nighttime finish to create cooler temperatures for spectators. The start time was moved back several times throughout the 1990s and finally settled at 5:30 pm in 2001, to attempt to have the race finished by 10 pm ET, in time for local news on Fox affiliates. With the new starting time came new challenges. Not only do race teams have to deal with the blistering Carolina heat, but the considerable temperature drop at night affects track conditions.

The nighttime portion of the race is lit with a system that uses parabolic reflectors so that dangerous glare that would otherwise be in the drivers' eyes is minimized. The move of the race to the early evening made it possible for drivers to do Double Duty – run the Indianapolis 500, then immediately fly from Indianapolis to Charlotte, and participate in the Coca-Cola 600. Experts disagreed over whether, for health and safety reasons, anyone should be allowed to race 1100 miles in one day, but no regulation has been set by any governing body to prevent it. From 2005 to 2010, the issue became moot when the state of Indiana finally decided to implement daylight saving time. This resulted in only an approximately one-hour interval between the end of the Indianapolis 500 and the start of the Coca-Cola 600. The Indianapolis 500 start time was moved back to noon Eastern in 2011 which also moved the Coca-Cola 600 back to 6 pm, since 2011, only 2 drivers have attempted the Double Duty, with the most recent being Kyle Larson in 2024, however, due to rain, he was unable to race in the Coca-Cola 600.

Until the Ferko lawsuit settlement took effect, the race was considered the third leg of the grand slam and was once part of the Winston Million. It is considered one of the top five annual NASCAR races.

Beginning in 2017, NASCAR adopted the stage-racing format, dividing each of its top three division's races into three stages. Originally, the 600 was going to have stages 1 & 2 be 115 laps in length, with the third and final stage encompassing the remaining 170 laps. Just a few weeks before the race, the stage format for the race was changed with the addition of a fourth stage, and the race is divided into four uniform stages of 100 laps each. This makes it the only race on the schedule with four stages instead of three. If the weather interferes, NASCAR's rule that a race becomes official after the conclusion of the second stage still applies. It also makes the Coca-Cola 600 the highest scoring race in terms of points a driver can collect. Usually, if a driver sweeps all the stages and passes inspection they score 60 points (40 for winning, and 10 for the first two stages), but with 4 stages the maximum is 70 (which Kyle Busch accomplished in 2018 and Kyle Larson accomplished in 2021).

As part of the race's annual tribute to the United States military, "Amazing Grace" (performed by the Charlotte Fire Department Pipe Band) and "Taps" are played prior to the National Anthem (usually sung by a military ensemble or personnel) in memory of members of the Armed Forces who lost their life in the line of duty. Also, after the second stage, all drivers shut off their engines for a moment of silence to remember those in the military who have fallen.

== Name changes ==
From 1960 to 1984 the race was known as the World 600. In 1985, the race's name was changed to Coca-Cola World 600. In 1986 the name was shortened to the Coca-Cola 600, or Coke 600 for short. The name changed again in 2002 to the Coca-Cola Racing Family 600 referring to the Coca-Cola family of drivers who are sponsored by Coca-Cola. In 2003, the name returned to the Coca-Cola 600.

== Individual race details ==
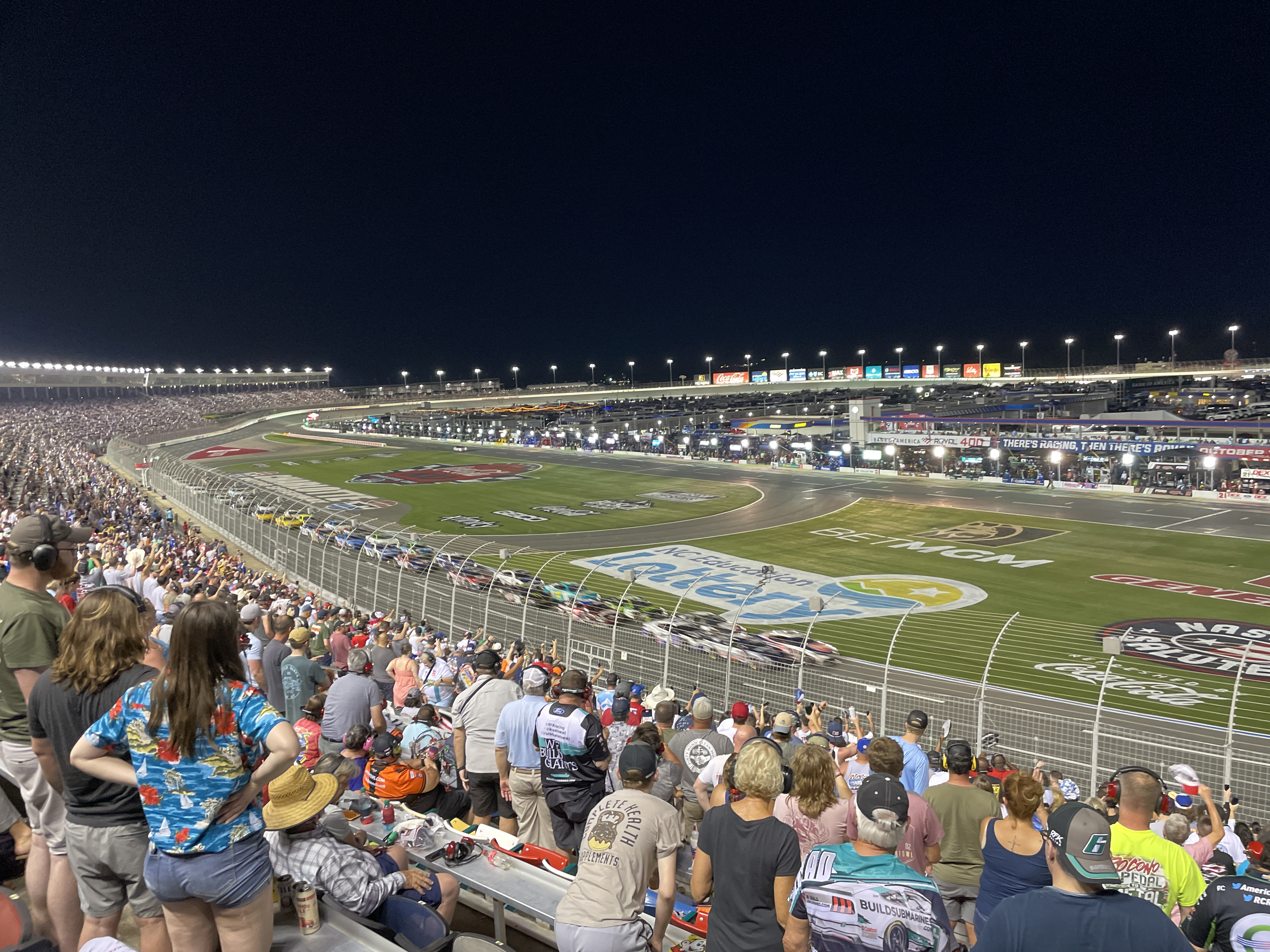
2024 Coca-Cola 600, won by Christopher Bell

- 1960: In the inaugural World 600 in 1960, Don O'Dell's Pontiac smashed the driver's door of Lenny Page's Chevy. Lenny Page was lucky to even survive the impact, and was in critical condition afterward. Reporter Chris Economaki rushed to the scene and applied CPR until safety crews arrived. He was later credited with saving Lenny's life.
- 1961: The race saw numerous crashes, including a very bad collision involving Reds Kagle, who lost a leg when his Ford smashed through the guardrail in Turn Three. David Pearson lost almost all of a multi-lap lead when a tire popped coming to the white flag but finished the race as winner, his first in Grand National racing.
- 1964: Fireball Roberts suffered a hard crash in this race, resulting in an inferno. Roberts was severely burned and would die of complications on July 2 of that year.
- 1974: The race was shortened to 540 miles because of the nation's short-lived fuel crisis, which was won by David Pearson over Richard Petty. The lead changed 37 times between Pearson, Petty, Cale Yarborough, Buddy Baker, and Donnie Allison, the most lead changes in the event's history to that point.
- 1975: Richard Petty, after years of frustration, finally collected his first victory at the World 600, proceeding to lap the field. Additionally; another future seven-time champion, Dale Earnhardt, made his Cup Series debut; finishing 21st, one position ahead of his future boss Richard Childress.
- 1976: Bruton Smith resumed full control of the speedway with the resignation of former track president Richard Howard. In a move to boost promotion of the race, Janet Guthrie was entered in a car wrenched by Ralph Moody. Pearson edged Petty again after a cut tire dropped Yarborough off the lead lap.
- 1977: Two racing legends won races on the same day. Richard Petty win his second World 600, while A. J. Foyt was winning his fourth at Indy.
- 1978: Darrell Waltrip won the first of his record five 600s in 1978 in a race-long six-car shootout; on the final lap Benny Parsons and David Pearson crashed. The lead changed 43 times, the most competitive 600 to that point of its history.
- 1979: The race saw the most lead changes (59) in the race's history. Darrell Waltrip took the win over Richard Petty and rookie Dale Earnhardt.
- 1980: The race lasted seven hours due to 14 caution flags and two lengthy red flags for rain. Multiple tire failures helped lead to an epidemic of wrecks; at Lap 275 Dale Earnhardt blew a tire and his spin caught up Bobby Allison, Cale Yarborough, and David Pearson. Waltrip had the lead but in the final 20 laps was challenged by Benny Parsons; the two battled with the lead changing some seven times before Parsons edged Waltrip by a car length.
- 1982: Neil Bonnett won his first World 600 driving the famous No. 21 Wood Brothers Ford.
- 1983: Jim Vandiver's final race, with Neil Bonnett winning his second World 600 driving the No. 75 Rahmoc-Hodgdon Chevrolet.
- 1985: Considerable pre-race hype surrounded the race as Bill Elliott entered with a chance to win a million-dollar cash bonus for a "small slam" of the sport's four majors. Elliott won the pole position and led 81 laps, but faded to 18th at the finish. Darrell Waltrip took the victory, a key victory en route to the championship. Waltrip (who won the inaugural All-Star race a day earlier) nearly missed the race after a car/engine swap controversy with NASCAR Director of Competition Dick Beatty. Elliott went on to win the Winston Million later in the season at Darlington but never won the 600 in his career.
- 1988: In the middle of a tire war between the Goodyear Tire and Rubber Company and Hoosier Racing Tire (now part of Continental AG), multiple tire failures marred the previous week's All-Star race, all involving Goodyear. Goodyear withdrew the tires originally designated for the 600 and substituted a harder compound. Only Dave Marcis stayed with the harder Goodyear tires for the 600. But during the 600, Hoosier tire failures were rampant. Darrell Waltrip survived and edged Rusty Wallace for the win, becoming the first four-time winner of the race.
- 1989: Darrell Waltrip becomes the only driver to win the event for a record 5th time (1978, 1979, 1985, 1988, 1989). After also winning the season-opening Daytona 500, Waltrip now had won two of the sport's four majors, setting himself up for the million-dollar bonus for a small slam at Darlington. He would not be successful. (Waltrip had not won the final major, Darlington, and never took the checkered flag to win the Southern 500; his final career win, at that race in 1992, took place when he took the lead during pit stops on Lap 293 and the race was suspended by a red flag after 298 laps for rain, after which it was never completed.)
- 1992: The race saw a controversial finish. Dale Earnhardt emerged from late green-flag pit stops with the lead after trailing by some three seconds entering the pits; there were complaints from several teams, notably Morgan–McClure Motorsports whose driver Ernie Irvan finished second, that Earnhardt had broken NASCAR's mandated pit road speed limit. This race, the last Coca-Cola 600 to be run entirely in daylight, marked the only victory for Earnhardt in 1992.
- 1993: Earnhardt was plagued by controversy again by first getting busted for speeding on pit road, then penalized a lap for aggressive driving after spinning out the lapped car of Greg Sacks. On a pit stop, he was penalized for not having all 5 lug nuts tightened, when in fact all 5 were tight. NASCAR threw the caution after the debacle, but Earnhardt made up the two laps he was down to take the lead late in the race on his way to his third Coca-Cola 600 win. This was also the first Coca-Cola 600 to start late in the day and end under the lights, which has been done since.
- 1994: Second-year driver Jeff Gordon won the first race of his career. His team gambled on the final pit stop, taking on only two tires, giving him a better track position.
- 1995: The race was a dramatic affair as the lead changed 32 times, the most since 1988, and the battle for the lead became a spirited multi-lap affair between Bobby Labonte, Dale Earnhardt, Rusty Wallace, and Sterling Marlin. Labonte punted Earnhardt out of the lead late in the race and sweated out late green-flag stops for fuel to take the win, his first in Winston Cup.
- 1999: Dale Earnhardt Jr. made his Winston Cup Series debut in this race.
- 2000: Talk this year was of Dale Earnhardt Jr. trying to be the first rookie to win the race, winning the pole and dominating all of the phases of the race. However, Matt Kenseth became the first rookie to win the race after holding off Bobby Labonte over the final laps. It was Kenseth's first career win.
- 2001: While Jeff Burton won the race, Tony Stewart stunned the racing world by successfully pulling off the full distances of the Memorial Day Double.
- 2005: During this race, a new record for the most cautions of any NASCAR Cup Series race was set at 22 cautions. In addition, there was a red flag late in the race because of debris. On the last lap, Jimmie Johnson slid past Bobby Labonte in turn four, claiming the checkered flag by inches. In doing so he became the first driver to win three consecutive Coca-Cola 600s. He would finish a distant second to Kasey Kahne the following year.
- 2007: In one of NASCAR's biggest upsets, Casey Mears won. Tony Stewart led with ten laps remaining, hoping to win his first Coca-Cola 600, but had to pit for fuel with 8 laps left, giving the lead to Dale Earnhardt Jr. until he ran out of fuel. Denny Hamlin led with seven laps remaining until he also ran out of fuel. Mears, driving for Hendrick Motorsports in the No. 25, took the lead for six laps remaining to win, running out of fuel just after crossing the finish line. The entire podium consisted of J. J. Yeley (2nd) and Kyle Petty (third). It was the final podium result for all three drivers. Reed Sorenson (4th) and Brian Vickers (5th) completed the top five.
- 2009: Although nicknamed the 24 Hours of Charlotte, it was the shortest run of the race in its history. The race was delayed from Sunday to Monday due to a rainstorm, and the following day, more rain forced the race to end at only 227 laps, although it took a six and a half hour marathon to reach that point, due to frequent interruptions by competition cautions and three red flags, including a two-hour period under the red flag which ended the race and declared David Reutimann the winner, one of few drivers who opted not to pit under the final caution. Reutimann was the second surprise first-time winner in 2009 after Brad Keselowski's win at Talladega the month before.
- 2011: The 2011 running, at 603 miles, was the longest distance in NASCAR history at the time. Dale Earnhardt Jr., trying to break a long winless drought, ran out of gas coming off of turn 4, and Kevin Harvick scored his third win of 2011.
- 2013: The 2013 running was red-flagged 126 laps in, when a cable that supported a Skycam used by Fox Sports over the front stretch of the race track, snapped and fell onto the racing surface. Several spectators were injured as a result of the failure, and several race cars were damaged. The race restarted but was red-flagged again on lap 325 for a large wreck entering turn one. Kevin Harvick won the race for the second time when he took two tires on the final caution and passed Kasey Kahne, who did not pit.
- 2014: Jimmie Johnson won his fourth Coca-Cola 600, and first since 2005. During the race, the world's biggest photo was captured. The 348-gigapixel image captured during the race is 70,000 times bigger than a standard self-portrait and allows each and every one of the more than 100,000 fans in the stands who attended the event to zoom in on the 360-degree image and find themselves.
- 2015: Carl Edwards won his first Coca-Cola 600 and first while driving for Joe Gibbs Racing.
- 2016: Martin Truex Jr. started on the pole and led an event record 392 of 400 laps and a series record 588 of 600 miles en route to his first win at the Coca-Cola 600. Additionally, the race was the fastest-ran Coca-Cola 600 in history at an average speed of 160.655, clocking in at 3 hours, 44 minutes, and 5 seconds.
- 2017: First race to run in four stages rather than three. Austin Dillon, running on fumes, held off Kyle Busch to score his first career Cup win. The race also marked the return of the #3 to victory lane for the first time since Dale Earnhardt scored his final career victory at Talladega in 2000. Just before halfway, a rainstorm happened to delay the race for an hour and 30 mins. With the delay, the race finished at 12:30 am EDT on Memorial Day Monday. Danica Patrick leads 7 laps becoming the first woman to lead the Coca-Cola 600.
- 2018: Kyle Busch dominated the race by winning sweeping all the stages, and leading 377 of the 400 laps to score his first career win at Charlotte, making him the first driver to win a race at every racetrack in the Cup Series that he has competed at, and every track that is on the current schedule.
- 2019: 21-year-old William Byron was the youngest driver ever to take pole position for the Coca-Cola 600. With 16 caution flags and an elapsed time of 4 hours and 50 minutes, this running of the race became the longest since 2005, since surpassed by 2022's running.
- 2020: With government restrictions over COVID-19 pandemic affecting all sports across America, NASCAR continued after a two-month absence, but it also prohibited fans in the stands. Chase Elliott looked like he was going to win the event until his teammate William Byron spun bringing out the caution with just two laps to go. Elliott decided to pit with others while Brad Keselowski stayed out inheriting the lead for a green-white-checkered finish. Elliott charged from 11th to 3rd with Keselowski giving Roger Penske his second 600 win over Jimmie Johnson on a day in which the Indianapolis 500 was postponed due to the pandemic. In post-race tech, Johnson's car violated rear-end alignments disqualifying him from 2nd to dead last (40th) and lifting Elliott to second. Rain delayed the event by an hour and forty minutes just 50 laps in, with the checkered-flag waving at just past midnight on Memorial Day. The race ending in overtime broke the record for the longest NASCAR race run set in 2011. Keselowski crossed the start/finish line after completing 405 laps/607.5 miles, breaking the 2011 record of 402 laps/603 miles.
- 2022: The 2022 running, at 619.5 miles, brought on by two overtime finishes, broke the record for the longest NASCAR race by 12 miles. With 18 caution flags and an elapsed time of five hours and 13 minutes, this running surpassed 2019 as the longest running of the race since 2005, coming 46 seconds of race time shy of being longer than that race.
- 2025: The 2025 race marked history, as Ross Chastain won the race from a backup car. Chastain set the record for the lowest starting position of an eventual winner in the history of the Coca-Cola 600.

== First-time winners ==
The Coca-Cola 600 has been the site of many drivers' first wins, including, Casey Mears (2007), David Reutimann (2009), and future champions David Pearson (1961), Jeff Gordon (1994), Bobby Labonte (1995), and Matt Kenseth (2000). The most recent driver to have the 600 as his first win was Austin Dillon, who won in 2017.

== Past winners ==
Year	Date	No.	Driver	Team	Manufacturer	Laps	Miles (kilometers)	Race time	Average speed	Report	Ref											
Year	Date	No.	Driver	Team	Manufacturer	Laps	Miles (kilometers)	Race time	Average speed	Report	Ref	1960	June 19*	89	Joe Lee Johnson	Paul McDuffie	Chevrolet	400	600 (965.606)	5:34:06	107.735	Report
1961	May 28	3	David Pearson	John Masoni	Pontiac	400	600 (965.606)	5:22:29	111.633	Report												
1962	May 27	29	Nelson Stacy	Holman-Moody	Ford	400	600 (965.606)	4:46:44	125.552	Report												
1963	June 2*	28	Fred Lorenzen	Holman-Moody	Ford	400	600 (965.606)	4:31:52	132.417	Report												
1964	May 24	41	Jim Paschal	Petty Enterprises	Plymouth	400	600 (965.606)	4:46:14	125.772	Report												
1965	May 23	28	Fred Lorenzen	Holman-Moody	Ford	400	600 (965.606)	4:55:38	121.722	Report												
1966	May 22	42	Marvin Panch	Petty Enterprises	Plymouth	400	600 (965.606)	4:26:35	135.042	Report												
1967	May 28	14	Jim Paschal	Frieden Enterprises	Plymouth	400	600 (965.606)	4:25:02	135.832	Report												
1968	May 26	3	Buddy Baker	Ray Fox	Dodge	255*	382.5 (615.574)	3:04:14	104.207	Report												
1969	May 25	98	LeeRoy Yarbrough	Junior Johnson & Associates	Mercury	400	600 (965.606)	4:27:56	134.361	Report												
1970	May 24	27	Donnie Allison	Banjo Matthews	Ford	400	600 (965.606)	4:37:36	129.68	Report												
1971	May 30	12	Bobby Allison	Holman-Moody	Mercury	400	600 (965.606)	4:16:20	140.422	Report												
1972	May 28	11	Buddy Baker	Petty Enterprises	Dodge	400	600 (965.606)	4:13:04	142.255	Report												
1973	May 27	71	Buddy Baker	Nord Krauskopf	Dodge	400	600 (965.606)	4:26:53	134.89	Report												
1974	May 26	21	David Pearson	Wood Brothers Racing	Mercury	360*	540 (869.045)	3:58:21	135.72	Report												
1975	May 25	43	Richard Petty	Petty Enterprises	Dodge	400	600 (965.606)	4:07:42	145.327	Report												
1976	May 30	21	David Pearson	Wood Brothers Racing	Mercury	400	600 (965.606)	4:22:06	137.352	Report												
1977	May 29	43	Richard Petty	Petty Enterprises	Dodge	400	600 (965.606)	4:21:29	137.676	Report												
1978	May 28	88	Darrell Waltrip	DiGard Motorsports	Chevrolet	400	600 (965.606)	4:20:12	138.355	Report												
1979	May 27	88	Darrell Waltrip	DiGard Motorsports	Chevrolet	400	600 (965.606)	4:23:24	136.674	Report												
1980	May 25	27	Benny Parsons	M. C. Anderson Racing	Chevrolet	400	600 (965.606)	5:01:51	119.265	Report												
1981	May 24	28	Bobby Allison	Ranier-Lundy	Buick	400	600 (965.606)	4:38:22	129.326	Report												
1982	May 30	21	Neil Bonnett	Wood Brothers Racing	Ford	400	600 (965.606)	4:36:48	130.058	Report												
1983	May 29	75	Neil Bonnett	RahMoc Enterprises	Chevrolet	400	600 (965.606)	4:15:51	140.707	Report												
1984	May 27	22	Bobby Allison	DiGard Motorsports	Buick	400	600 (965.606)	4:38:34	129.233	Report												
1985	May 26	11	Darrell Waltrip	Junior Johnson & Associates	Chevrolet	400	600 (965.606)	4:13:52	141.807	Report												
1986	May 25	3	Dale Earnhardt	Richard Childress Racing	Chevrolet	400	600 (965.606)	4:16:24	140.406	Report												
1987	May 24	21	Kyle Petty	Wood Brothers Racing	Ford	400	600 (965.606)	4:33:48	131.483	Report												
1988	May 29	17	Darrell Waltrip	Hendrick Motorsports	Chevrolet	400	600 (965.606)	4:49:15	124.46	Report												
1989	May 28	17	Darrell Waltrip	Hendrick Motorsports	Chevrolet	400	600 (965.606)	4:09:52	144.077	Report												
1990	May 27	27	Rusty Wallace	Blue Max Racing	Pontiac	400	600 (965.606)	4:21:32	137.65	Report												
1991	May 26	28	Davey Allison	Robert Yates Racing	Ford	400	600 (965.606)	4:19:05	138.951	Report												
1992	May 24	3	Dale Earnhardt	Richard Childress Racing	Chevrolet	400	600 (965.606)	4:30:43	132.98	Report												
1993	May 30	3	Dale Earnhardt	Richard Childress Racing	Chevrolet	400	600 (965.606)	4:07:25	145.504	Report												
1994	May 29	24	Jeff Gordon	Hendrick Motorsports	Chevrolet	400	600 (965.606)	4:18:10	139.445	Report												
1995	May 28	18	Bobby Labonte	Joe Gibbs Racing	Chevrolet	400	600 (965.606)	3:56:55	151.952	Report												
1996	May 26	88	Dale Jarrett	Robert Yates Racing	Ford	400	600 (965.606)	4:03:56	147.581	Report												
1997	May 25–26*	24	Jeff Gordon	Hendrick Motorsports	Chevrolet	333*	499.5 (803.867)	3:39:10	136.745	Report												
1998	May 24	24	Jeff Gordon	Hendrick Motorsports	Chevrolet	400	600 (965.606)	4:23:53	136.424	Report												
1999	May 30	99	Jeff Burton	Roush Racing	Ford	400	600 (965.606)	3:57:50	151.367	Report												
2000	May 28	17	Matt Kenseth	Roush Racing	Ford	400	600 (965.606)	4:12:23	142.64	Report												
2001	May 27	99	Jeff Burton	Roush Racing	Ford	400	600 (965.606)	4:20:40	138.107	Report												
2002	May 26	6	Mark Martin	Roush Racing	Ford	400	600 (965.606)	4:21:23	137.729	Report												
2003	May 25	48	Jimmie Johnson	Hendrick Motorsports	Chevrolet	276*	414 (666.268)	3:16:50	126.198	Report												
2004	May 30	48	Jimmie Johnson	Hendrick Motorsports	Chevrolet	400	600 (965.606)	4:12:10	142.763	Report												
2005	May 29	48	Jimmie Johnson	Hendrick Motorsports	Chevrolet	400	600 (965.606)	5:13:52	114.698	Report												
2006	May 28	9	Kasey Kahne	Evernham Motorsports	Dodge	400	600 (965.606)	4:39:25	128.84	Report												
2007	May 27	25	Casey Mears	Hendrick Motorsports	Chevrolet	400	600 (965.606)	4:36:27	130.222	Report												
2008	May 25	9	Kasey Kahne	Gillett Evernham Motorsports	Dodge	400	600 (965.606)	4:25:09	135.772	Report												
2009	May 25*	00	David Reutimann	Michael Waltrip Racing	Toyota	227*	340.5 (547.981)	2:48:59	120.899	Report												
2010	May 30	2	Kurt Busch	Penske Racing	Dodge	400	600 (965.606)	4:08:20	144.966	Report												
2011	May 29	29	Kevin Harvick	Richard Childress Racing	Chevrolet	402*	603 (970.434)	4:33:14	132.414	Report												
2012	May 27	5	Kasey Kahne	Hendrick Motorsports	Chevrolet	400	600 (965.606)	3:51:14	155.687	Report												
2013	May 26	29	Kevin Harvick	Richard Childress Racing	Chevrolet	400	600 (965.606)	4:35:49	130.521	Report												
2014	May 25	48	Jimmie Johnson	Hendrick Motorsports	Chevrolet	400	600 (965.606)	4:07:27	145.484	Report												
2015	May 24	19	Carl Edwards	Joe Gibbs Racing	Toyota	400	600 (965.606)	4:03:34	147.803	Report												
2016	May 29	78	Martin Truex Jr.	Furniture Row Racing	Toyota	400	600 (965.606)	3:44:05	160.655	Report												
2017	May 28–29*	3	Austin Dillon	Richard Childress Racing	Chevrolet	400	600 (965.606)	4:19:22	138.8	Report												
2018	May 27	18	Kyle Busch	Joe Gibbs Racing	Toyota	400	600 (965.606)	4:23:22	136.692	Report												
2019	May 26	19	Martin Truex Jr.	Joe Gibbs Racing	Toyota	400	600 (965.606)	4:50:09	124.074	Report												
2020	May 24–25*	2	Brad Keselowski	Team Penske	Ford	405*	607.5 (977.467)	4:29:55	135.024	Report												
2021	May 30	5	Kyle Larson	Hendrick Motorsports	Chevrolet	400	600 (965.606)	3:58:45	150.785	Report												
2022	May 29	11	Denny Hamlin	Joe Gibbs Racing	Toyota	413*	619.5 (996.988)	5:13:08	118.703	Report												
2023	May 29*	12	Ryan Blaney	Team Penske	Ford	400	600 (965.606)	4:58:50	120.465	Report												
2024	May 26	20	Christopher Bell	Joe Gibbs Racing	Toyota	249*	373.5 (601.089)	3:02:07	123.053	Report												
2025	May 25	1	Ross Chastain	Trackhouse Racing	Chevrolet	400	600 (965.606)	4:25:08	135.781	Report												
2026	May 24	7	Daniel Suárez	Spire Motorsports	Chevrolet	373*	559.5 (900.427)	4:39:56	119.921	Report												
2027	May 30									Report												

=== Notes ===
- 1960: Race postponed three weeks due to construction delays for the racetrack.
- 1963, 2009, and 2023: Races postponed from Sunday to Monday because of rain.
- 1968, 2003, 2009, 2024, and 2026: Races shortened due to rain.
- 1974: Race shortened due to energy crisis.
- 1997, 2017, and 2020: Races ran on Sunday but finished after midnight on Monday due to rain.
- 1997: Race shortened due to 1 a.m noise ordinance.
- 2011, 2020, and 2022: Races extended due to NASCAR overtime.

=== Multiple winners (drivers) ===
# wins	Driver	Years won
5	Darrell Waltrip	1978-1979, 1985, 1988-1989
4	Jimmie Johnson	2003-2005, 2014
3	Buddy Baker	1968, 1972-1973
3	David Pearson	1961, 1974, 1976
3	Bobby Allison	1971, 1981, 1984
3	Dale Earnhardt	1986, 1992-1993
3	Jeff Gordon	1994, 1997-1998
3	Kasey Kahne	2006, 2008, 2012
2	Fred Lorenzen	1963, 1965
2	Jim Paschal	1964, 1967
2	Richard Petty	1975, 1977
2	Neil Bonnett	1982-1983
2	Jeff Burton	1999, 2001
2	Kevin Harvick	2011, 2013
2	Martin Truex Jr.	2016, 2019

=== Multiple winners (teams) ===
# wins	Team	Years won
12	Hendrick Motorsports	1988-1989, 1994, 1997, 1998, 2003–2005, 2007, 2012, 2014, 2021
6	Richard Childress Racing	1986, 1992-1993, 2011, 2013, 2017
6	Joe Gibbs Racing	1995, 2015, 2018-2019, 2022, 2024
5	Petty Enterprises	1964, 1966, 1972, 1975, 1977
4	Holman-Moody	1962-1963, 1965, 1971
4	Wood Brothers Racing	1974, 1976, 1982, 1987
4	Roush Racing	1999–2002
3	DiGard Motorsports	1978-1979, 1984
3	Team Penske	2010, 2020, 2023
2	Junior Johnson & Associates	1969, 1985
2	Robert Yates Racing	1991, 1996
2	Gillett Evernham Motorsports	2006, 2008

=== Manufacturer wins ===
# wins	Manufacturer	Years won
27	Chevrolet	1960, 1978–1980, 1983, 1985-1986, 1988-1989, 1992–1995, 1997-1998, 2003–2005, 2007, 2011–2014, 2017, 2021, 2025-2026
14	Ford	1962-1963, 1965, 1970, 1982, 1987, 1991, 1996, 1999–2002, 2020, 2023
8	Dodge	1968, 1972-1973, 1975, 1977, 2006, 2008, 2010
7	Toyota	2009, 2015-2016, 2018-2019, 2022, 2024
4	Mercury	1969, 1971, 1974, 1976
3	Plymouth	1964, 1966-1967
2	Buick	1981, 1984
2	Pontiac	1961, 1990

== World 600 qualifier ==
Year	Date	No.	Driver	Team	Manufacturer	Race distance		Race time	Average speed (mph)	Report	Ref
Year	Date	No.	Driver	Team	Manufacturer	Laps	Miles (km)	Race time	Average speed (mph)	Report	Ref
1961	May 21	43	Richard Petty	Petty Enterprises	Plymouth	67	100.5 (161.739)	0:45:09	133.554	Report	
1961	May 21	8	Joe Weatherly	Bud Moore Engineering	Pontiac	67	100.5 (161.739)	0:52:18	115.591	Report	
1963	June 1	30	Bunkie Blackburn	Fred Clark	Chevrolet	20	30 (48.28)	0:17:30	102.857	Report	

== See also ==
- Double Duty

Previous race: Ecosave 400 (points); NASCAR All-Star Race (exhibition)	NASCAR Cup Series; Coca-Cola 600	Next race: Cracker Barrel 400
