= Herb Nab =

NASCAR crew chief

- Nab c. 1977

Personal information
- Born: April 1, 1927 Fruita, Colorado, U.S.
- Died: October 29, 1988 (aged 61) Mooresville, North Carolina, U.S.
- Occupation: Crew chief
- Years active: 1950s–1988
- Employers: Holman-Moody; Junior Johnson & Associates; Ranier Racing

Herb Nab (April 1, 1927 – October 29, 1988) was a NASCAR Grand National/Winston Cup Series crew chief. He is regarded by many as one of the greatest crew chiefs in NASCAR history. Nab earned two NASCAR Cup championships and multiple wins in the Daytona 500 and Southern 500, and prepared winning cars for drivers such as Joe Weatherly, Curtis Turner, Fireball Roberts, Fred Lorenzen, Junior Johnson, LeeRoy Yarbrough, Bobby Allison, Cale Yarborough, and Buddy Baker.

Nab was called "one of the sport's first superstar crew chiefs" and was called by his peers as "the first of the really top chassis experts in NASCAR."

== Early life ==
Nab was born on April 1, 1927, in Fruita, Colorado. He was the son of a Russian immigrant father and a German immigrant mother. Shortly after his birth, the family moved to Idaho and operated a farm.

Nab quit school after the seventh grade and ran away to Nevada to work as a truck driver, despite being underage. Nab then worked jobs in a California shipyard, and a jewelry shop in Idaho. At the age of 18, he worked as a mechanic at an Allis-Chalmers dealership in Idaho. In the early 1950s, he moved to Portland, Oregon, where he worked as a roofer for his brother's business before taking a job as a mechanic at a Dodge-Plymouth dealership.

== NASCAR career ==
While working at the Portland Dodge-Plymouth dealership, salesman Bill Amick invited Nab to prepare his car for racing at the Portland Speedway.

Nab's first race as a crew chief in the NASCAR Cup Series came at the Arizona State Fairgrounds in May 1955. Amick qualified in pole position. He followed that with a pole position the following week in Tucson, Arizona.

In 1956, Nab was hired by Pete DePaolo who was establishing a team with factory support from Ford Motor Company. Nab moved to Charlotte, North Carolina, and was head mechanic in charge of the cars that would compete on short tracks with drivers Amick and Marvin Panch.

=== Holman-Moody ===
In June 1957, Detroit manufacturers withdrew factory support from stock car racing in order to, "de-emphasize speed and horsepower in promoting its product." The Ford factory team was re-organized as Holman-Moody and Nab continued with the team.

Nab and Amick won high-paying Convertible Series races at Raleigh Speedway, Norfolk, and Martinsville Speedway in August 1957.

Nab led Joe Weatherly's team to victory at the Rebel 300 at Darlington in May 1960.

In 1961, Fred Lorenzen joined Holman-Moody. Under Nab's leadership, Lorenzen won at Martinsville, the Rebel 300, and the July 250-mile race at Atlanta.

Setting up the Holman-Moody teammates of Lorenzen and Nelson Stacy in 1962, Herb led Stacy to a win at the Rebel 300, Nab's third straight in the race. Stacy then won the World 600 at Charlotte Motor Speedway. In July, Lorenzen won the Atlanta 500.

1963 was a breakthrough year for Lorenzen and Nab. After finishing second in the Daytona 500, the team won the Atlanta 500 and World 600 among six victories for the year. Lorenzen and Nab became the first time in NASCAR history to earn over $100,000 in a single season.

Lorenzen followed his historic 1963 season with eight victories in 1964, including a repeat at the Atlanta 500.

During the 1964 Rebel 300 at Darlington, Nab was fired mid-race by team-owner Ralph Moody. Moody wanted to pit Lorenzen with 30 laps to go, fearing a tire would not last the rest of the race. Nab objected and left Lorenzen on track. Lorenzen drove to the victory with no tire issues and Nab's dismissal was rescinded days later.

Nab was considered one of the first to understand chassis setup in order to maximize handling. He explained in 1964, "Years of time taught me what I know about setting up a chassis. And the most important thing I ever learned was something Ralph Moody told me a long, long time ago. He told me to never put anything down on paper, and that way no one will ever find out what you know. I commit everything to memory, and I have more than average retentive power, I think. But that's a funny thing. While I never forget anything I do mechanically, I never was one much for school."

=== Junior Johnson and Associates ===
Prior to the 1965 season, Nab left Holman-Moody to join the team of Junior Johnson & Associates. Under the leadership of Nab, Johnson had his statistically best season. Johnson opened the year by winning the pole for the Motor Trend 500 at Riverside International Raceway and finished second. He then won a qualifying race at Daytona, and led the first 27 laps of the Daytona 500 before he blew a tire and crashed on lap 28. Nab and Johnson won the Rebel 300 at Darlington Raceway, and races at Bristol Motor Speedway, Bowman Gray Stadium, North Wilkesboro Speedway, and Martinsville Speedway. In total, Johnson and Nab won 13 times in 1965, a career high for Johnson, who retired at the end of the season.

In 1969, Nab and driver LeeRoy Yarbrough put together one of NASCAR's greatest seasons by winning almost all of NASCAR's marquee events. With a last-lap pass, Yarbrough won the Daytona 500, the first for Yarbrough as a driver, Nab as a mechanic, and Johnson as a car-owner. They followed that with victories in the Rebel 400, World 600, Firecracker 400, Dixie 500, Southern 500, and American 500 at Rockingham.

In 1971, Johnson and Nab built a Chevrolet Monte Carlo for driver Charlie Glotzbach. At Bristol in July, Glotzbach won to score the first victory for Chevrolet in NASCAR since 1968.

For 1972, Bobby Allison was hired to drive for the team. Under Nab's leadership, Allison won 10 races and finished second in Winston Cup points. Allison left the team after one year and was replaced by Cale Yarborough.

Nab pouring champagne on Yarborough after his victory in the 1975 Carolina 500

In Yarborough's first year for the team, they won four races and finished second in points. In 1974, Yarborough and Nab won ten races and again finished second in points.

In 1976, Yarborough and Nab won nine races and won the Winston Cup championship. It was the first title for Yarborough, Nab, and Johnson. The Nab-led crew attracted considerable attention when they completed a mid-race engine change at Pocono Raceway in 36 minutes. One week later, the crew was able to change an engine during the Talladega 500 in only 20 minutes. Nab said, "We wanted to win the championship and figured if we blew an engine we would still have to finish the race."

In May 1976, Janet Guthrie entered the World 600 and attempted to become the first woman to qualify for in NASCAR race in many years. To assist with the effort, Junior Johnson allowed Herb Nab to prepare Guthrie's car. Guthrie qualified 27th and credited Nab's setup with being a main factor.

In 1977, Yarborough again won nine races and repeated as Winston Cup champion.

=== Ranier Racing ===
Following back-to-back championships, Nab left Junior Johnson and Associates to work for the Harry Ranier-owned WIN Racing Inc. Nab joined engine-builder Waddell Wilson to prepare cars for driver Lennie Pond. Nab was offered complete control of the team, a large salary of $50,000, and Ranier promised to pay off the mortgage of Nab's house.

Nab reflected in 1987, "It put me on my feet financially, and if I had to do it all over again, I'd still do it. Now, I'd have rather cut off my right arm than have left Junior and Cale; I thought so much of them. But at that point in my career, I was 50 years old and didn't have much money. So I had to take Ranier's offer."

Pond won the Talladega 500 in August to earn the team's first win and their only of 1978.

For 1979, Buddy Baker replaced Pond as driver for the team. They opened the season by winning the pole for the Daytona 500, the Busch Clash at Daytona, and a Daytona 500 qualifying race. Early in the 1979 Daytona 500, Baker retired with ignition problems.

Baker won the Atlanta 500 in March. The team struggled throughout the spring and Nab was replaced as crew-chief for a trial period of three races in June. In those races, Baker won at Michigan and won the pole positions at Texas World Speedway and Daytona.

"I don't see how this three race thing is going to prove anything. I've won over 150 races and how do you balance three races against 150 wins?" Nab was replaced as crew-chief by Waddell Wilson but remained under contract.

=== Later career ===
After leaving Ranier Racing, Nab was semi-retired. He joined the Kenny Childers-owned team in August 1980 with driver Donnie Allison. The Childers team shut down in April 1981 and Nab went to the Richard Howard-owned team with cars driven by Elliott Forbes-Robinson. Nab was left sidelined again when the team closed in August.

In June 1982, Nab was hired to serve as the crew-chief for Mark Martin in his rookie season.

In 1983, Nab was crew chief for IndyCar champion Tom Sneva as he ran a part-time NASCAR schedule.

Nab began 1984 as crew chief for Randy Baker. In 1985, Nab joined Richard Petty's team as a chassis specialist.

In April 1987, Nab was hired as a consultant for Harry Gant's team. In Nab's first race with the team, Gant won the pole position at Bristol. Nab said, "Everybody had put me out to pasture. They all said I lost everything I knew... This has to be one of the greatest things that's ever happened to me. And I don't mind telling you it brought tears to my eyes. This shows the people I've still got it in me."

For 1988, Nab was hired as crew chief for the team owned and driven by Buddy Baker. Baker finished ninth in the Daytona 500 and scored two additional top-10 finishes in the first seven races. Nab resigned from the team in April.

Herb Nab died at the age of 61 on October 29, 1988, from a heart attack at his home in Mooresville, North Carolina.

== Honors ==
Nab's teams won the NASCAR pit stop competition at Rockingham in 1969 and 1972.

Nab was inducted into the Mechanic's Hall of Fame in 1977.

Nab was inducted into the West Coast Stock Car Hall of Fame in 2010.

Nab was inducted into the National Motorsports Press Association Hall of Fame in 2022.

Nab was nominated for the Motorsports Hall of Fame of America in 2024.

Nab was nominated for the NASCAR Hall of Fame in 2026.
