= Marvin Panch =

American racing driver (1926–2015)

- Panch c. 1963
- Born: Marvin Emil Panch; May 28, 1926; Menomonie, Wisconsin, U.S.
- Died: December 31, 2015 (aged 89); Port Orange, Florida, U.S.
- Achievements: 1961 Daytona 500 Winner; 1966 World 600 Winner
- Awards: Named one of NASCAR's 50 Greatest Drivers (1998); West Coast Stock Car Hall of Fame (2002 - Inaugural Class); National Motorsports Press Association Hall of Fame inductee (1987); Named one of NASCAR's 75 Greatest Drivers (2023)

NASCAR Cup Series career
- 216 races run over 15 years
- Best finish: 2nd (1957)
- First race: 1951 Race 35 (Oakland)
- Last race: 1966 National 500 (Charlotte)
- First win: 1956 Race 35 (Montgomery)
- Last win: 1966 World 600 (Charlotte)
Wins	Top tens	Poles
17	126	21

ARCA Menards Series West career
- 24 races run over 7 years
- Best finish: 3rd (1954, 1955)
- First race: 1954 Race 1 (Oakland)
- Last race: 1966 Altamont 100 Presented by Chevron (Altamont)
- First win: 1954 Race 3 (Hanford)
- Last win: 1956 Race 31 (Willow Springs)
Wins	Top tens	Poles
5	20	3
- Statistics up to date as of October 16, 2026.

Marvin Emil Panch (May 28, 1926 – December 31, 2015) was an American stock car racing driver. Winner of the 1961 Daytona 500 and 1966 World 600, he won seventeen NASCAR Grand National Series events during a 17-year career.

== Early career ==
Born in Menomonie, Wisconsin, Panch relocated to California at an early age. He started his racing career as a car owner in Oakland, California. One week, his driver did not show up, and he raced the car to a third-place finish. He won a championship and several races in six years, including five NASCAR races on the West Coast of the United States.

== NASCAR career ==
Panch attempted his first East Coast race at Darlington Raceway in 1953. NASCAR founder Bill France Sr. convinced him to come east for 1954. Lee Petty invited Panch to race in the 1954 Darlington race, where he finished third. The finish impressed Tom Horbison, who hired Panch to race his car during the 1955 season. His 1955 finishes caught the attention of Pete DePaolo, who hired Panch to race in his factory Ford team. Panch won his first NASCAR race on July 20, 1956, at Montgomery after starting on the pole position and dominating the entire race.

Panch won the two races in 1957 for DePaolo. He added another victory in April before Ford ended its factory support in the middle of the season. Panch joined the legendary Holman-Moody team for the rest of the season. He won three more events in the season and finished second in the final points standings.

The end of the Ford factory sponsorship hurt Panch's career. Over the next three seasons, he was only able to race in 24 races.

Panch was offered a ride by famed NASCAR mechanic Smokey Yunick in the 1961 Daytona 500. The car was a year old (1960) Pontiac. Panch took the offer and won the 1961 Daytona 500 to put his career back on track. During the 1962 season he was offered a ride by renowned car owners the Wood Brothers. He accepted the ride in the Ford factory-sponsored team. Panch had eight wins and 30 top-three finishes in 69 races for the team. He stayed with the team from 1962 to March 27, 1966, when Ford had another dispute with NASCAR. In 1965, A. J. Foyt finished the Atlanta 500 at Atlanta Motor Speedway in a car Panch had started, taking it to victory. Panch received credit for the win.

In February 1963 at Daytona, Panch tried to set a speed record in a Ford-powered Maserati but crashed. He was pulled to safety by fellow drivers Tiny Lund, Ernie Gahan and Bill Wimble, Firestone's Steve Petrasek, and mechanic Jerry Rayborn. His rescuers were awarded the Carnegie Medal for heroism. Hospitalized with second and third degree burns and serious injuries, Panch asked car owner Glenn Wood to hire Lund. Tiny won the 1963 Daytona 500 in the car that the injured Panch had been scheduled to drive. Lund said of Panch: "Marvin would have done the same for us."

Panch was hired by Petty to race for Petty Enterprises for the 1966 World 600 in a year old car. Panch won the race for his final career victory when Petty was his relief driver. Panch raced for Petty Enterprises until he announced his retirement after the National 500 at Charlotte in October 1966.

== Awards ==
Panch was named one of NASCAR's 50 Greatest Drivers in 1998. He was inducted into the National Motorsports Press Association Hall of Fame in 1987, and the West Coast Stock Car/Motorsports Hall of Fame in its first class in 2002.

== Personal life ==
Panch's second wife Bettie founded the Women's Auxiliary of Motorsports. He is the father of four children: Pamela and Marvann, from his first marriage to Hester Herrald, and Richard (deceased) and Marvette, from his second marriage to Bettie Gong.

Following his Daytona 500 win, Panch purchased property in Port Orange, Florida, relocating there after the end of his career. On December 31, 2015, Panch was found unconscious in his car, and was later pronounced dead of natural causes.

== Motorsports career results ==
=== NASCAR ===
(key) (Bold – Pole position awarded by qualifying time. Italics – Pole position earned by points standings or practice time. * – Most laps led.)

==== Grand National Series ====
NASCAR Grand National Series results
Year	Team	No.	Make	1	2	3	4	5	6	7	8	9	10	11	12	13	14	15	16	17	18	19	20	21	22	23	24	25	26	27	28	29	30	31	32	33	34	35	36	37	38	39	40	41	42	43	44	45	46	47	48	49	50	51	52	53	54	55	56	57	58	59	60	61	62	NGNC	Pts	Ref
1951	Marvin Panch	56	Mercury	DAB	CLT	NMO	GAR	HBO	ASF	NWS	MAR	CAN	CLS	CLB	DSP	GAR	GRS	BAI	HEI	AWS	MCF	ALS	MSF	FMS	MOR	ABS	DAR	CLB	CCS	LAN	CLT	DSP	WIL	HBO	TPN	PGS	MAR	OAK; 6	NWS				GAR; 16	NMO																						36th	371.5	
1951	Marvin Panch	56	Ford																																					HMS; 2	JSP	ATL																								36th	371.5	
1953	Marvin Panch	06	Dodge	PBS	DAB	HAR	NWS	CLT	RCH	CCS	LAN	CLB	HCY	MAR	PMS	RSP	LOU	FFS	LAN	TCS	WIL	MCF	PIF	MOR	ATL	RVS	LCF	DAV	HBO	AWS	PAS	HCY	DAR; 28	CCS	LAN; 18	BLF	WIL	NWS	MAR	ATL																										60th	214	
1954	Beryl Jackson	98	Dodge	PBS	DAB	JSP	ATL	OSP	OAK; 2	NWS	HBO	CCS	LAN	WIL	MAR	SHA	RSP	CLT	GAR	CLB	LND	HCY	MCF	WGS	PIF	AWS	SFS	GRS	MOR	**OAK**; 2	CLT			DAR; 3	CCS																															17th	1935	
1954	John Fernandez	98	Dodge																													SAN; 10																																		17th	1935	
1954	Chet Chiroso	15	Plymouth																														COR; 9																																	17th	1935	
1954	Beryl Jackson	98	Olds																																	CLT; 22	LAN; 13	MAS; 7	MAR; 19	NWS; 6																										17th	1935	
1955	Marvin Panch	56	Mercury	TCS	PBS	JSP	DAB	OSP	CLB	HBO	NWS	MGY	LAN	CLT	HCY	ASF; 2	TUS; 16	MAR	RCH	NCF	FOR	LIN	MCF	FON	AIR	CLT	PIF	CLB	AWS	MOR	ALS	NYF																																		14th	2812	
1955	John Hernandez	56	Mercury																														SAN; 4	CLT	FOR	MAS	RSP																													14th	2812	
1955	Julian Petty	44	Chevy																																			DAR; 13	MGY; 21	LAN; 4	RSP	GPS																								14th	2812	
1955	DePaolo Engineering	98	Ford																																								MAS; 2	CLB	MAR; 11	LVP	NWS; 23	HBO; 11																		14th	2812	
1956	Tom Harbison	98	Olds	HCY; 9	CLT																																																													10th	4680	
1956	Tom Harbison	98	Ford			WSS; 2	PBS; 13	ASF; 4																														**MGY**; 1	OKL	ROA; 22*	OBS	SAN	NOR	PIF	MYB	POR		CSH; 3	CLT; 4					NWP; 21	CLT; 3	CCF; 3	MAR; 2	HCY	WIL; 6							10th	4680	
1956	Tom Harbison	98	Dodge						DAB; 72	PBS; 25	WIL	ATL	NWS	LAN	RCH	CLB																																																		10th	4680	
1956	Tom Harbison	9	Ford														CON; 15	GPS	HCY	HBO	MAR	LIN	CLT	POR	EUR	NYF	MER	MAS	CLT	MCF	POR	AWS																		LAN; 34	POR	CLB	HBO													10th	4680	
1956	Tom Harbison	99	Ford																														RSP; 7	PIF; 3	CSF	CHI	CCF																													10th	4680	
1956	DePaolo Engineering	8	Ford																																												DAR; 3																			10th	4680	
1957	DePaolo Engineering	98	Ford	**WSS**; 1*	CON; 1*	TIC; 3	DAB; 5		WIL; 19	HBO; 11	**AWS**; 16	NWS; 4	LAN; 17	**CLT**; 2	PIF; 1	GBF; 19	POR	CCF; 3	RCH; 3	MAR; 8	POR	EUR	**LIN**; 4	LCS; 4	ASP																																									2nd	9956	
1957	DePaolo Engineering	12	Ford					CON; 16																																																										2nd	9956	
1957	Marvin Panch	98	Ford																							NWP; 2	CLB; 3	CPS	PIF; 19	JAC	RSP; 8	CLT; 1			HCY; 12		LCS; 3			LIN; 1	OBS; 4	MYB; 13	DAR; 3	NYF	AWS; 7	CSF	SCF	LAN; 34	CLB; 6	CCF; 2	CLT; 18		NBR; 4	CON; 4	NWS; 7	GBF; 21										2nd	9956	
1957	Herb Thomas	92	Pontiac																														MAS; 1	POR		NOR; 16		GLN; 14	KPC																											2nd	9956	
1957	Fireball Roberts	22	Ford																																																	MAR; 16														2nd	9956	
1958	John Whitford	98	Ford	FAY	DAB; 14	CON	FAY	**WIL**; 3	HBO; 2	FAY	CLB; 31	PIF	ATL; 4	CLT; 17	MAR; 5	ODS	OBS	GPS	GBF	STR	NWS	BGS	**TRN**; 23	RSD	CLB; 19	NBS	REF	LIN	HCY	AWS	RSP	MCC	SLS	TOR	BUF	MCF	BEL	BRR	CLB	NSV	AWS	BGS	MBS	DAR; 5	CLT	BIR	CSF	GAF	RCH	HBO	SAS	MAR; 31	NWS	ATL												18th	3424	
1959	Tom Vernon	98	Ford	FAY	DAY	DAY; 17	HBO	CON	ATL																														DAR; 29	HCY	RCH	CSF	HBO	MAR; 38	AWS	NWS	CON																			66th	352	
1959	Don Angel	3	Ford							WIL; 22	BGS	CLB	NWS	REF	HCY	MAR	TRN	CLT	NSV	ASP	PIF	GPS	ATL	CLB	WIL	RCH	BGS	AWS	DAY	HEI	CLT	MBS	CLT	NSV	AWS	BGS	GPS	CLB																												66th	352	
1960	Tom Vernon	98	Ford	CLT; 22	CLB	DAY; 26	DAY	DAY; 46	CLT	NWS	PHO	CLB	MAR	HCY	WIL	BGS	GPS	AWS																																																26th	5268	
1960	W.J. Ridgeway	77	Ford																DAR; 10	PIF	HBO	RCH	HMS	CLT; 17	BGS	DAY; 14	HEI	MAB	MBS	ATL; 17	BIR	NSV	AWS; 33	PIF	CLB	SBO	BGS	DAR; 11	HCY	CSF	GSP	HBO	MAR	NWS	CLT; 48	RCH	ATL; 38																			26th	5268	
1961	Smokey Yunick	20	Pontiac	CLT	JSP	DAY	DAY; 2	DAY; 1	PIF	AWS	HMS																CLT; 43	PIF	BIR	GPS	BGS	NOR	HAS	STR	DAY; 4	ATL	CLB	MBS	BRI	NSV	BGS	AWS	RCH	SBO								CLT; 26	BRI	GPS	HBO											18th	9392	
1961	John Masoni	3	Pontiac									**ATL**; 6*	GPS	HBO	BGS	MAR	NWS	CLB	HCY	RCH	MAR	DAR; 6	CLT	CLT	RSD	ASP																																								18th	9392	
1961	Petty Enterprises	42	Plymouth																																										DAR; 31	HCY	RCH	CSF																		18th	9392	
1961	Owens Racing	6	Pontiac																																														ATL; 10	MAR	NWS															18th	9392	
1962	Bob Osiecki	90	Dodge	CON	AWS	DAY	DAY; 20	DAY; 44	CON	AWS	SVH	HBO																																																						9th	15138	
1962	Data not available	20	Ford										RCH; 17	CLB																																																				9th	15138	
1962	Wood Brothers Racing	21	Ford												NWS; 32	GPS	MBS	MAR; 6	BGS	BRI; 26	RCH	HCY	CON; 13	DAR; 2	PIF	CLT; 8	ATL; 8	BGS	AUG	RCH	SBO	DAY; 3	CLB	ASH	GPS	AUG	SVH	MBS	BRI; 11	CHT	NSV	HUN	AWS	STR	BGS	PIF	VAL	DAR; 3	HCY	RCH	DTS	AUG	MAR; 33	NWS; 2	CLT; 15	ATL; 3										9th	15138	
1963	Wood Brothers Racing	21	Ford	BIR	GGS	THS	RSD	DAY	DAY	DAY	PIF	AWS	HBO	ATL	HCY	BRI	AUG	RCH	GPS	SBO	BGS	MAR	NWS	CLB	THS	DAR	ODS	RCH	CLT; 7	BIR	**ATL**; 3	DAY; 3	MBS	SVH	DTS	BGS	ASH	OBS; 6	BRR; 3	BRI; 4	GPS	NSV	CLB	AWS	PIF	BGS	ONA; 9	DAR; 2	HCY	RCH	MAR; 2	DTS	NWS; 1	THS	**CLT**; 3	SBO	HBO									13th	17156	
1963	Wood Brothers Racing	121	Ford																																																							RSD; 3								13th	17156	
1964	Wood Brothers Racing	21	Ford	CON	AUG; 9	JSP	SVH	RSD; 2	DAY; 4	DAY	DAY; 4	RCH; 6	**BRI**; 5	GPS; 3	**BGS**; 1*	ATL; 14	**AWS**; 1*	HBO; 17	PIF; 2	CLB; 2	NWS; 3	MAR; 2	SVH; 2	DAR; 11	LGY; 2	HCY; 13	**SBO**; 2	CLT; 29	**GPS**; 11	ASH; 3	ATL; 29	CON	NSV	CHT	BIR	VAL	PIF	DAY; 27	ODS	OBS					BRI; 7	NSV	MBS	AWS	DTS	ONA	CLB	BGS	STR	DAR	HCY	RCH	ODS	HBO	MAR; 4	SVH	NWS; 1	CLT; 31	HAR	AUG	JAC	10th	21480	
1964	Holman-Moody	06	Ford																																						BRR; 4	ISP																								10th	21480	
1964	Bondy Long	71	Ford																																								GLN; 24	LIN																						10th	21480	
1965	Wood Brothers Racing	21	Ford	RSD; 3	DAY	DAY; 3	DAY; 6*	PIF	ASW	RCH	HBO	**ATL**; 1*	GPS	NWS; 5	MAR; 2	CLB	**BRI**; 4	DAR; 11	LGY	BGS	HCY	CLT; 33	CCF	ASH	HAR	NSV	BIR	ATL; 1	GPS	MBS	VAL	**DAY**; 12	ODS	**OBS**; 3*	**ISP**; 1*	GLN; 1*	BRI; 35	NSV	CCF	AWS	SMR	PIF	AUG	CLB	DTS	BLV	BGS	DAR; 37	HCY	LIN	ODS	RCH	MAR; 5	NWS; 6	CLT; 35	HBO	CAR; 3	DTS								5th	22798	
1966	Wood Brothers Racing	21	Ford	AUG	RSD; 30	DAY; 4	DAY	DAY; 26	CAR; 17	BRI; 18	ATL; 16	HCY	CLB	GPS	BGS	NWS	MAR	DAR	LGY	MGR	MON	RCH																																												17th	15308	
1966	Petty Enterprises	42	Plymouth																				CLT; 1	DTS	ASH	PIF	SMR	AWS	BLV	GPS										ATL; 28	CLB	AWS	BLV	BGS	DAR; 4	HCY	RCH	HBO	MAR	NWS	CLT; 6	CAR														17th	15308	
1966	Friedkin Enterprises	04	Plymouth																												DAY; 7	ODS																																		17th	15308	
1966	Data not available	22	Ford																														BRR; 3	OXF; 21	FON	ISP; 18	BRI	SMR	NSV																											17th	15308	

===== Daytona 500 =====
Year	Team	Manufacturer	Start	Finish
1959	Tom Vernon	Ford	4	17
1960	Tom Vernon	Ford	51	46
1961	Smokey Yunick	Pontiac	4	**1**
1962	Bob Osiecki	Dodge	37	44
1964	Wood Brothers Racing	Ford	9	4
1965	Wood Brothers Racing	Ford	6	6
1966	Wood Brothers Racing	Ford	7	26

Achievements
Preceded by Junior Johnson	Daytona 500 Winner; 1961	Succeeded by Fireball Roberts
