= Holman-Moody =

American race car builder organization

(United States) Holman Moody
- Owner(s): Lee Holman; Previously: John Holman, Ralph Moody
- Base: Charlotte, North Carolina, United States
- Series: NASCAR Winston Cup Series; World Sportscar Championship
- Race drivers: See below.
- Manufacturer: Ford
- Opened: 1957
- Closed: 1973 (race team) Holman-Moody remains in operation as a manufacturer

Career
- Drivers' Championships: 2 (1968, 1969)

Holman-Moody is an American racecar manufacturer, marine engine manufacturer and former auto racing team. The company currently operates out of Charlotte, North Carolina, but is no longer a race team. Holman-Moody continues to manufacture racing vehicles using vintage parts and methods, along with special editions of modern Ford sports cars. The race team built virtually all of the factory Ford racing vehicles of the 1950s, 1960s, and 1970s. It owned race cars that competed in NASCAR, drag racing, ocean boat racing, rallies, and sports car racing. The team won NASCAR championships in 1968 and 1969 with driver David Pearson and also the 1967 Daytona 500 with Mario Andretti. Their most recognized trademark is "Competition Proven."

== Formation ==
John Holman was hired in 1952 by Clay Smith and Bill Stroppe to drive their parts truck to each leg of the 1952 Mexican Road Race and to stay ahead of the racing team. The team won the race, and they hired Holman as a full-time mechanic and parts man after the race to work in their Long Beach, California shop. Holman worked for the team until 1956, when Ford Motor Company hired him to run their factory team shop at Charlotte, North Carolina. Ralph Moody won four NASCAR races in 1956. He raced the first third of 1957, until Ford and the other American automobile manufacturers pulled out of racing.

They formed a partnership after the American Manufacturers' Association banned Ford's factory participation in stockcar racing in June 1957, which unemployed both men. They decided to pool their resources, and formed Holman-Moody. Moody immediately took out a loan against an airplane that he owned, and with Holman paid $12,000 to buy the shop and equipment that had been Ford's Charlotte-based racing operation Holman-Moody was one of the first to sell "purpose-built" stock car chassis for racing. Holman-Moody Fords won their first two races in 1957.

Holman-Moody entered two cars in the final two races at the Daytona Beach Road Course in 1958. The cars were raced by Curtis Turner and Joe Weatherly. The cars finished first and third in one race, and second and fourth in the second. The team became more focused on building cars for other teams as the season went on. Ford slowly began increasing support for racing as the season went on. Ford stopped the assembly line to allow Holman-Moody to buy bare bodies and parts for construction of 1959 Thunderbirds. The cars came without needed parts. Turner won races at Champion Speedway, Lakewood Speedway, and the Southern States Fairgrounds.

Holman-Moody's car driven by Johnny Beauchamp finished in a dead heat with Lee Petty at the first race at the new Daytona International Speedway. The 1959 Daytona 500 win was awarded to Petty after three days.

Holman-Moody entered the "World's fastest Falcon" in the 12 Hours of Sebring in 1962. The car was driven by Marvin Panch and Jocko Maggiacomo. Holman-Moody also prepared a small-block AC Cobra, driven by Augie Pabst.

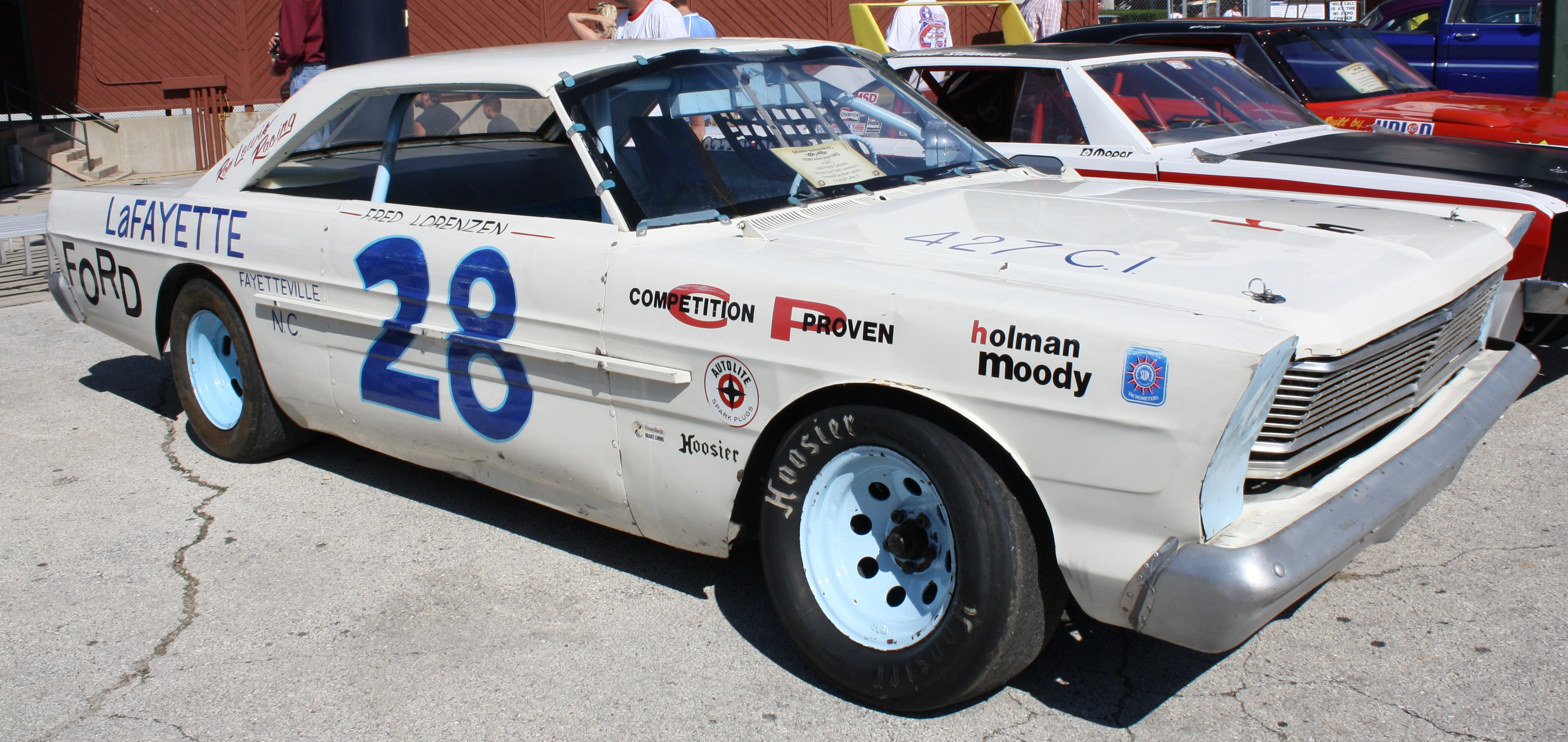
1965 Ford Galaxie or replica

Ironically, Holman-Moody bought out Bill Stroppe in 1965 and the Long Beach facility at 2190 Temple Ave. became Holman-Moody-Stroppe. They built around 50 race cars a year until Moody sold his portion of the company after the 1972 season. They had won 94 NASCAR Grand National races.

Holman-Moody also built and raced Ford GT-40s in the 24 Hours of Le Mans races from 1966-1967. The team's best finish was a third place as part of the famous 1966 Ford 1-2-3 photo finish.

Holman died in 1975 after suffering a heart attack while testing an intercooler. The team was owned by a trust for several years, until Lee Holman took over the operations in 1978.

Holman-Moody operated for a number of years in a former NC Air National Guard Hangar near the Charlotte-Douglas International Airport. This hangar had been constructed during World War II at Charlotte's Morris Field Army Air Field, and in 1964 the Ford Motor Company paid Larry Jenkins to move it from the NC Air Guard base to an off-runway plot of land on the other side of the airport. This is where Holman-Moody used the hangar.

The Charlotte airport gave notice that it intended to condemn the Holman-Moody building in 1982 so they could construct an additional runway. The company sold off all of its equipment, and Lee Holman bought most of it. Holman Automotive continued the building of racecars, engine building for the No. 21 Wood Brothers NASCAR team, and grinding cams for several NASCAR teams.

On March 25, 2009, the hangar was torn down to make way for Charlotte's third parallel runway. The company moved from its original 75,000 sq ft shop next to the airport to another location in Charlotte.

They continue to build and restore collector race cars and engines with the majority of the employees having worked for Holman-Moody since the 1960s.

In the 1990s, Holman-Moody, in partnership with Holman Automotive, began manufacturing GT 40 MkIIs again. They made them originally back in the 1960s and these cars all raced with Holman-Moody serial number tags. Holman-Moody has the original Ford blue prints for these cars and the result is that they are vintage legal. They are built with exactly the same specifications as they were in the 1960s.

They also made three reproductions of the 1964 Fairlanes that raced against the Cobras and GT-40s. The first of these Fairlanes continues to win races in Europe.

== Team highlights ==
Holman-Moody-built Fords won 48 of 55 NASCAR Grand National Series races in 1965, a record that has never been broken. Mario Andretti won the 1967 Daytona 500, and David Pearson won the 1968 and 1969 NASCAR championships. Dan Gurney won five races at Riverside International Raceway. Pearson drove a Wood Brothers Ford to victory in the 1976 Daytona 500. Fred Lorenzen was one of the nation's highest paid athletes at $122,558 while driving a Holman-Moody car in 1963.

== Awards ==
Holman-Moody was inducted in the Motorsports Hall of Fame of America in 2005.

== Current work ==
Holman-Moody is no longer involved in racing. The company is currently owned and operated by Lee Holman, son of co-founder John Holman. From their location in Charlotte, North Carolina, the company continues to produce GT40s using what remains of the original chassis. These vehicles are distinguished by the fact that they are not reproductions, but newly built original racecars.

Holman-Moody has also collaborated directly with Ford to create the 2014 TdF Mustang, a specially optioned and upgraded Ford Mustang commemorative of the Mustang's first ever racing win, 50 years prior at the Tour de France rally. The company continues to manufacture and stock parts for many classic performance Fords, which can be purchased by the public via their office or website.

== Innovations ==
Holman-Moody had a lasting effect on all forms of auto racing. Their innovations include fuel cells, full-floater rear axle, on-board fire systems, quick change disk brakes, square tube frames, and tube shocks. The 1966 Holman-Moody Ford Fairlane was the basis for all NASCAR racecars until NASCAR redesigned their car as the Car of Tomorrow.

== Notable drivers ==
Holman-Moody had many notable drivers, including:

- Bobby Allison
- Donnie Allison
- Mario Andretti
- Johnny Beauchamp
- Ronnie Bucknum
- Jim Clark
- Mark Donohue
- A. J. Foyt
- Dan Gurney
- Walt Hansgen
- Dick Hutcherson
- Ned Jarrett
- Bobby Johns
- Junior Johnson
- Parnelli Jones
- Bo Ljungfeldt
- Fred Lorenzen
- Tiny Lund
- Dave MacDonald
- Ken Miles
- Augie Pabst
- Marvin Panch
- David Pearson
- Peter Revson
- Fireball Roberts
- Lloyd Ruby
- Nelson Stacy
- Curtis Turner
- Al Unser
- Bobby Unser
- Joe Weatherly
- Jackie Wilson
- Cale Yarborough
- Wendell Scott
- Sam Sommers

== Notable crew chiefs ==
Holman-Moody had numerous crew members who became notable crew chiefs, including:

- Keith Dorton
- Jake Elder
- Dick Hutcherson
- Dick Russell
- Jimmy Tucker
- Waddell Wilson
- Robert Yates
- Herb Nab
- James Hylton

== Bibliography ==
- Tom Cotter & Al Pearce (1 January 2003). Holman Moody: The Legendary Race Team. Motorbooks International. ISBN 978-0760308752.
