= 1963 Sandlapper 200 =

Auto race held at Columbia Speedway in 1963

Race details
- Race 40 of 55 in the 1963 NASCAR Grand National Series season
- Date: August 8, 1963; 62 years ago
- Official name: Sandlapper 200
- Location: Columbia Speedway, Columbia, South Carolina
- Course: Permanent racing facility
- Course length: 0.500 miles (0.804 km)
- Distance: 200 laps, 100 mi (160 km)
- Weather: Extremely hot with temperatures of 95.0 °F (35.0 °C); wind speeds of 11.10 miles per hour (17.86 km/h)
- Average speed: 83.360 miles per hour (134.155 km/h)

Pole position
Driver	Richard Petty	Petty Enterprises

Most laps led
Driver	Richard Petty	Petty Enterprises
- Laps: 138

Winner
No. 43	Richard Petty	Petty Enterprises

The 1963 Sandlapper 200 was the site of Richard Petty's 25th NASCAR Grand National win for Petty Enterprises (now Richard Petty Motorsports).

Taking place on August 8, 1963, at Columbia Speedway in Columbia, South Carolina. Two hundred laps were done on a dirt track spanning 0.500 miles (0.805 km). The transition to purpose-built racecars began in the early 1960s and occurred gradually over that decade. Changes made to the sport by the late 1960s brought an end to the "strictly stock" vehicles of the 1950s.

== Background ==
Columbia Speedway was an oval racetrack located in Cayce, a suburb of Columbia, South Carolina. It was the site of auto races for NASCAR's top series from 1951 through 1971. For most of its history, the racing surface was dirt. The races in April and August 1970 were two of the final three Grand National races ever held on a dirt track.

The track was paved before hosting its last two Grand National races in 1971.

While Columbia Speedway was shut down to cars in 1979, noise complaints, it reopened as a velodrome in 2001.

== Race report ==
This race was the last time that the letter "X" could be legally used as a race number. An amendment to one of NASCAR's rules made by Bill France Sr. forced all drivers to use only single-digit and double-digit race car numbers started in the 1963 Western North Carolina 500 event. As a result, cars could no longer use letters and/or numbers higher than "99" at any NASCAR Cup Series racing event.

It took one hour, forty-seven minutes, and fifty-five seconds for Richard Petty to defeat David Pearson with a margin of nine seconds. Pearson and Petty would start a bitter rivalry during the course of the race that would ultimately influence all future rivalries in the NASCAR Cup Series. The notable speeds were: 55.598 mph (89.476 km/h) as the average speed and 69.014 mph (111.067 km/h) as the pole position speed. 8,500 people attended this untelevised race. Other notable participants included: J. D. McDuffie, Wendell Scott, Cale Yarborough and Buck Baker. Possum Jones scored last place in the race after only finishing five laps due to tire issues.

Frank Warren finished the race 13th in his unsponsored 1961 Pontiac Catalina vehicle (with the X designation for his driver number) after starting in 18th place. He received $100 ($1,052 when considering inflation) as a part of his winnings. Total winnings for this race were $4,825 ($50,741 when considering inflation) with Petty receiving most of it with $1,140 ($11,989 when considering inflation).

Billy Oswald would retire from professional stock car racing after the completion of this event. Ray Fox, Herman Beam and Crawford Clements were the most notable crew chiefs that participated in the race.

This was the first of more than 60 "first-place/second-place" finishes for NASCAR's two most prolific winners Richard Petty and David Pearson. Both Petty and Pearson were considered to be equals to each other in the 1960s because of their similar methodology of professional stock car racing.

=== Qualifying ===
Grid	No.	Driver	Manufacturer	Owner
1	43	Richard Petty	'63 Plymouth	Petty Enterprises
2	8	Joe Weatherly	'63 Pontiac	Bud Moore
3	99	Bobby Isaac	'63 Ford	Bondy Long
4	3	Junior Johnson	'63 Chevrolet	Ray Fox
5	11	Ned Jarrett	'63 Ford	Charles Robinson
6	76	J. D. McDuffie	'61 Ford	J. D. McDuffie
7	87	Buck Baker	'63 Pontiac	Buck Baker
8	03	G. C. Spencer	'62 Chevrolet	G. C. Spencer
9	5	Billy Wade	'63 Dodge	Cotton Owens
10	19	Cale Yarborough	'62 Ford	Herman Beam
11	54	Jimmy Pardue	'62 Pontiac	Pete Stewart
12	6	David Pearson	'63 Dodge	Cotton Owens
13	48	Jack Smith	'63 Plymouth	Jack Smith
14	62	Curtis Crider	'63 Mercury	Curtis Crider
15	05	Possum Jones	'61 Pontiac	Possum Jones
16	34	Wendell Scott	'62 Chevrolet	Wendell Scott
17	2	Fred Harb	'62 Pontiac	Cliff Stewart
18	X	Frank Warren	'61 Pontiac	unknown
19	68	Ed Livingston	'61 Ford	Ed Livingston
20	89	Joel Davis	'62 Pontiac	Joel Davis
21	57	Bobby Keck	'63 Ford	Pete Stewart
22	31	Billy Oswald	'61 Mercury	James Kelly

== Finishing order ==
Section reference:

1. Richard Petty (No. 43)
2. David Pearson (No. 6)
3. Bobby Isaac (No. 99)
4. Ned Jarrett (No. 11)
5. G. C. Spencer (No. 03)
6. Billy Wade (No. 5)
7. Jack Smith (No. 48)
8. Cale Yarborough (No. 19)
9. Wendell Scott (No. 34)
10. Bobby Keck (No. 57)
11. Joe Weatherly* (No. 8)
12. Curtis Crider (No. 62)
13. Frank Warren (No. X)
14. J. D. McDuffie* (No. 76)
15. Buck Baker* (No. 87)
16. Joel Davis* (No. 89)
17. Junior Johnson* (No. 3)
18. Billy Oswald* (No. 31)
19. Fred Harb* (No. 2)
20. Jimmy Pardue* (No. 54)
21. Ed Livingston* (No. 68)
22. Possum Jones* (No. 05)

* DNF

== Timeline ==
Section reference:

- Start of race: Richard Petty starts off the race in the pole position.
- Lap 5: Possum Jones developed tire problems, ending his weekend on the track.
- Lap 10: Ed Livingston had a terminal crash, forcing him to withdraw from the event.
- Lap 41: Jimmy Pardue's engine stopped working, causing him not to finish the race.
- Lap 61: Billy Oswald's vehicle developed a problematic engine, making him leave the race early.
- Lap 102: Junior Johnson had a terminal crash, causing him to exit from the race.
- Lap 104: David Pearson takes over the lead from Richard Petty.
- Lap 108: Buck Baker noticed his tie rod becoming a problem and withdrew from the event.
- Lap 127: J.D. McDuffie's axle became loose, ending any hopes of securing a top-ten finish.
- Lap 166: Richard Petty takes over the lead from David Pearson.
- Lap 185: Joe Weatherly saw his vehicle's sway bay became faulty, securing him an eleventh place finish.
- Finish: Richard Petty was officially declared the winner of the event.

Preceded by 1963 Pickens 200	Richard Petty's Career Wins; 1960-1984	Succeeded by 1963 untitled race at Old Dominion Speedway
