= 1971 Myers Brothers 250 =

Auto race held at Bowman Gray Stadium in 1971

Race details
- Race 34 of 48 in the 1971 NASCAR Winston Cup Series season
- Date: August 6, 1971
- Official name: Myers Brothers 250
- Location: Bowman Gray Stadium, Winston-Salem, North Carolina
- Course: Permanent racing facility
- Course length: 0.250 miles (0.421 km)
- Distance: 250 laps, 62.5 mi (100.5 km)
- Weather: Mild with temperatures of 75 °F (24 °C); wind speeds of 12 miles per hour (19 km/h)
- Average speed: 44.792 miles per hour (72.086 km/h)

Pole position
| Driver | Richard Petty | Petty Enterprises |

Most laps led
| Driver | Bobby Allison | Melvin Joseph |
- Laps: 138

Winner
| No. 49 | Bobby Allison | Melvin Joseph |

Television in the United States
- Network: untelevised
- Announcers: none

The 1971 Myers Brothers 250 was a NASCAR Winston Cup Series event that took place on August 6, 1971, at Bowman Gray Stadium in Winston-Salem, North Carolina. This race was the final NASCAR Cup Series event at Bowman Gray Stadium until the 2025 Cook Out Clash.

== Background ==
Bowman Gray Stadium is a NASCAR sanctioned 1/4-mile (0.40 km) asphalt flat oval short track and longstanding football stadium located in Winston-Salem, North Carolina. It is one of stock car racing's most legendary venues, and is referred to as "NASCAR's longest-running weekly race track". Bowman Gray Stadium is part of the Winston-Salem Sports and Entertainment Complex and is home of the Winston-Salem State University Rams football team. It was also the home of the Wake Forest University football team from 1956 until Groves Stadium (later BB&T Field) opened in 1968.

Bowman Gray Stadium was a popular venue for high school football in the 1970s.

== Race report ==
Because of reduced sponsorship money being given out by the "Big Three" automobile companies in Detroit, NASCAR decided to hold six of their smaller Winston Cup Series races in conjunction with the "minor league" NASCAR Grand American Series.

The complete time of the race was one hour and twenty-three minutes. Six cautions slowed the race for 36 laps, with Bobby Allison defeating Richard Petty by a margin of three seconds. Fourteen thousand people attended this live race with speeds approaching 44.472 miles per hour (71.571 km/h). Richard Petty qualified for the pole position with a speed of 55.283 miles per hour (88.969 km/h) in the solo qualifying portion of the race weekend. There was a 29-driver grid, making the racetrack overcrowded with racing vehicles and forcing the race to devolve into a glorified demolition derby. Bill Seifert, Cecil Gordon and Bill Shirey all quit the race before it was over. The result of the race would have long-reaching effects at the 1984 Firecracker 400, where they were determining whether Petty had his "200th win" or his "201st win."

Richard Petty and Bobby Allison shared their turns as being the joint leaders of the race. Future NASCAR car owner Richard Childress competed in this race as a driver. J. D. McDuffie was also a notable driver who competed in this race. David Ray Boggs would earn his first top-10 finish racing at this event. Almost 25% of the field was out by lap 18, which was probably about five minutes into the race, being at Bowman Gray.

Notable crew chiefs for this race were Dale Inman, Vic Ballard, and Lee Gordon.

As Bobby Allison was not racing in a Grand National car, he never received credit in that series but was credited with a Grand American Series ("pony" cars) win. Vehicles that competed at the Grand American series were in Chevrolet Camaros, Ford Mustangs and AMC Javelins as opposed to their full-sized equivalents from their manufacturers. NASCAR rules for combination races, which were in effect for Riverside and other West Coast races where the West Series raced with the Cup Series, and later used by other multiple-division races in NASCAR, state each division is scored separately, similar to rules used in the NASCAR-owned International Motor Sports Association sports car racing series. Under current rules, Richard Petty should be credited with a Grand National Series win as first in class.

In preparation for the NASCAR Clash at Bowman Gray in 2025, on October 23, 2024, NASCAR awarded Bobby Allison as the official winner, which was technically misclassified under current rules. Allison died three weeks later.

Petty's official class win has never been certified by NASCAR.

=== Qualifying ===
| Grid | No. | Driver | Manufacturer | Owner |
|---|---|---|---|---|
| 1 | 43 | Richard Petty | '70 Plymouth | Petty Enterprises |
| 2 | 49 | Bobby Allison | '70 Mustang | Melvin Joseph |
| 3 | 14 | Jim Paschal | '70 Javelin | Cliff Stewart |
| 4 | 15 | Wayne Andrews | '71 Mustang | Reid Shaw |
| 5 | 44 | Ken Rush | '69 Camaro | Johnny Wheeler |
| 6 | 26 | Earl Brooks | '69 Ford | Earl Brooks |
| 7 | 21 | Tommy Andrews | '69 Mustang | Tommy Andrews |
| 8 | 48 | James Hylton | '70 Ford | James Hylton |
| 9 | 87 | Buck Baker | '71 Firebird | Buck Baker |
| 10 | 79 | Frank Warren | '69 Dodge | Frank Warren |

== Finishing order ==
Section reference:

1. Bobby Allison (No. 49)
2. Richard Petty (No. 43)
3. Jim Paschal (No. 14)
4. Buck Baker (No. 87)
5. Dave Marcis (No. 11)
6. Tiny Lund (No. 55)
7. Wayne Andrews (No. 15)
8. Jabe Thomas (No. 25)
9. David Ray Boggs (No. 86)
10. Walter Ballard (No. 30)
11. Bill Champion (No. 10)
12. Randy Hutchinson (No. 2)
13. J.D. McDuffie (No. 70)
14. Ken Rush* (No. 44)
15. Elmo Langley* (No. 64)
16. Tommy Andrews* (No. 21)
17. Ed Negre* (No. 8)
18. Neil Castles* (No. 06)
19. Bill Hollar* (No. 28)
20. Ken Meisenhelder* (No. 41)
21. Richard Childress* (No. 96)
22. James Hylton* (No. 48)
23. Frank Warren* (No. 79)
24. Cecil Gordon* (No. 24)
25. Wendell Scott* (No. 34)
26. Earl Brooks* (No. 26)
27. Jerry Churchill* (No. 73)
28. Bill Seifert* (No. 45)
29. Bill Shirey* (No. 74)

* Driver failed to finish race

== Timeline ==
Section reference:

- Start of race: Richard Petty started the race with the pole position.
- Lap 1: Bill Shirey and Bill Seifert voluntarily quit the race.
- Lap 3: Jerry Churchill's car overheated.
- Lap 8: Earl Brooks noticed that his vehicle had transmission problems.
- Lap 13: Cecil Gordon voluntarily quit the race.
- Lap 18: Frank Warren developed transmission problems with his vehicle.
- Lap 38: Problems with his car's steering forced James Hylton into an ugly 22nd-place finish.
- Lap 40: Steering issues forced Richard Childress out of the event.
- Lap 56: Ken Meisenhelder saw that his vehicle was overheating, forcing him off the track for the remainder of the day.
- Lap 83: Bill Hollar noticed that his vehicle's brakes became faulty.
- Lap 94: Neil Castles had a dead battery in his race vehicle.
- Lap 97: Ed Negre had a problem with his carburetor, forcing him out of the race.
- Lap 103: Tommy Andrews had some issues with his vehicle's engine.
- Lap 109: Elmo Langley's ignition became faulty.
- Lap 113: Bobby Allison took over the lead from Richard Petty.
- Lap 117: Ken Rush was involved in a terminal crash, causing him to leave the race prematurely.
- Finish: Bobby Allison was officially declared the winner of the event.

| Preceded by 1971 Dixie 500 | NASCAR Winston Cup Season; 1971 | Succeeded by 1971 West Virginia 500 |
