= David Ray Boggs =

American racing driver (born 1943)

- Born: September 8, 1943 (age 83); Morrisville, North Carolina, U.S.
- Awards: 1970 NASCAR Grand American Rookie of the Year

NASCAR Cup Series career
- 32 races run over 3 years
- Best finish: 26th (1972)
- First race: 1971 Myers Brothers 250 (Bowman Gray)
- Last race: 1973 Rebel 500 (Darlington)
Wins	Top tens	Poles
0	2	0

NASCAR O'Reilly Auto Parts Series career
- 3 races run over 3 years
- Best finish: 92nd (1986)
- First race: 1983 Miller Time 300 (Charlotte)
- Last race: 1986 Protecta-Liner 200 (Rockingham)
Wins	Top tens	Poles
0	0	0

NASCAR Grand National East Series career
- 11 races run over 2 years
- Best finish: 9th (1973)
- First race: 1972 Greenville 200 (Greenville-Pickens)
- Last race: 1973 Tar Heel 200 (Fayetteville)
Wins	Top tens	Poles
0	4	0

David Ray Boggs (born September 8, 1943) is an American former professional stock car racing driver. Now retired, he is a former competitor in the NASCAR Grand American Series, the NASCAR Winston Cup Series, and the ARCA Racing Series.

== NASCAR career ==
Boggs made his debut in NASCAR competition in 1970, winning Rookie of the Year in the Grand American series. He moved up to the Winston Cup Series in 1971, making his debut at Bowman Gray Stadium and finishing ninth; he would compete in 32 races over three seasons, posting a best finish of sixth at Dover Downs International Speedway later that year. Boggs' Winston Cup career would be remembered most for a cut tire starting a wreck during the qualifying races for the 1972 Daytona 500 that resulted in the death of Friday Hassler. Boggs also competed in eleven races in the Grand National East Division in 1972 and 1973 with a best finish of fifth. Following his Winston Cup career, he returned to North Carolina's short tracks, competing in late model stock cars.

Boggs returned to NASCAR competition in the Busch Series between 1983 and 1986, running three races with a best finish of 21st; In his final race in the series at North Carolina Motor Speedway, he suffered broken legs in a crash. Boggs attempted a comeback in the series in 2002, attempting to qualify for the season-opening race at Daytona International Speedway, but failed to make the race.

== ARCA career ==
Boggs made his debut in Automobile Racing Club of America competition in 1973, running five races that were co-sanctioned with the NASCAR Grand National East Series; after competing in a few events in the series in the late 1980s, he became a regular competitor in ARCA during the 1990s. His best finish, fifth, came in a rain-shortened race at Lowe's Motor Speedway in 2003. Boggs retired from competition following the 2007 season.

== Motorsports career results ==
=== NASCAR ===
(key) (Bold – Pole position awarded by qualifying time. Italics – Pole position earned by points standings or practice time. * – Most laps led.)

==== Grand National Series ====
NASCAR Grand National Series results
Year	Team	No.	Make	1	2	3	4	5	6	7	8	9	10	11	12	13	14	15	16	17	18	19	20	21	22	23	24	25	26	27	28	29	30	31	32	33	34	35	36	37	38	39	40	41	42	43	44	45	46	47	48	NGNC	Pts	Ref
1971	David Ray Boggs	86	Firebird	RSD	DAY	DAY	DAY	ONT	RCH	CAR	HCY	BRI	ATL	CLB	GPS	SMR	NWS	MAR	DAR	SBO	TAL	ASH	KPT	CLT	DOV	MCH	RSD	HOU	GPS	DAY	BRI	AST	ISP	TRN	NSV	ATL	BGS; 9	ONA; 14	MCH	TAL								MGR; 28	RCH	NWS		57th	357	
1971	?	?	?																																						CLB; DNQ	HCY	DAR	MAR								57th	357	
1971	David Ray Boggs	57	Dodge																																										CLT; 18	DOV; 6	CAR; 19				TWS; 42	57th	357	

==== Winston Cup Series ====
NASCAR Winston Cup Series results
Year	Team	No.	Make	1	2	3	4	5	6	7	8	9	10	11	12	13	14	15	16	17	18	19	20	21	22	23	24	25	26	27	28	29	30	31	NWCC	Pts	Ref
1972	Boggs Racing Enterprises	57	Dodge	RSD; 31	DAY; 19	RCH; 18	ONT; 50	CAR; 17	ATL; DNQ	BRI; 20	DAR	NWS	MAR; 36	TAL; 12	CLT; 38	DOV; 33	MCH; DNQ	RSD	TWS; 30	DAY; 26	BRI; 23	TRN; 22	ATL; 26	TAL; 13	MCH; 31	NSV; 15	DAR; 18	RCH; 26	DOV; 38	MAR; 24	NWS; 24		CAR; Wth	TWS	26th	3739	
1972	Norris Reed	83	Mercury																													CLT; 20			26th	3739	
1973	J. C. Crews	53	Ford	RSD	DAY; DNQ	RCH	CAR	BRI	ATL	NWS																									NA	-	
1973	Frank Warren	79	Dodge								DAR; 29	MAR	TAL	NSV																					NA	-	
1973	Negre Racing	8	Dodge												CLT; DNQ	DOV	TWS	RSD	MCH	DAY	BRI	ATL	TAL	NSV	DAR	RCH	DOV	NWS	MAR	CLT	CAR				NA	-	

===== Daytona 500 =====
Year	Team	Manufacturer	Start	Finish
1972	Boggs Racing Enterprises	Dodge	25	19
1973	J. C. Crews	Ford	DNQ	

==== Busch Series ====
NASCAR Busch Series results
Year	Team	No.	Make	1	2	3	4	5	6	7	8	9	10	11	12	13	14	15	16	17	18	19	20	21	22	23	24	25	26	27	28	29	30	31	32	33	34	35	NBSC	Pts	Ref
1983	Tom Usry	03	Olds	DAY	RCH	CAR	HCY	MAR	NWS	SBO	GPS	LGY	DOV	BRI	CLT	SBO	HCY	ROU	SBO	ROU	CRW	ROU	SBO	HCY	LGY	IRP	GPS	BRI	HCY	DAR	RCH	NWS	SBO	MAR	ROU	CLT; 22	HCY	MAR	126th	97	
1984	?	35	Pontiac	DAY	RCH	CAR	HCY	MAR	DAR	ROU	NSV	LGY	MLW	DOV	CLT	SBO	HCY	ROU	SBO	ROU	HCY	IRP	LGY	SBO	BRI	DAR	RCH	NWS	CLT; 21	HCY	CAR	MAR							109th	N/A	
1986	Johnny Talley	35	Olds	DAY	CAR; 35	HCY	MAR	BRI	DAR	SBO	LGY	JFC	DOV	CLT	SBO	HCY	ROU	IRP	SBO	RAL	OXF	SBO	HCY	LGY	ROU	BRI	DAR	RCH	DOV	MAR	ROU	CLT	CAR	MAR					92nd	58	
2002	White Motorsports	22	Chevy	DAY; DNQ	CAR	LVS	DAR	BRI	TEX	NSH	TAL	CAL	RCH	NHA	NZH	CLT	DOV	NSH	KEN	MLW	DAY	CHI	GTY	PPR	IRP	MCH	BRI	DAR	RCH	DOV	KAN	CLT	MEM	ATL	CAR	PHO	HOM		N/A	0	

=== ARCA Re/Max Series ===
(key) (Bold – Pole position awarded by qualifying time. Italics – Pole position earned by points standings or practice time. * – Most laps led.)

ARCA Re/Max Series results
Year	Team	No.	Make	1	2	3	4	5	6	7	8	9	10	11	12	13	14	15	16	17	18	19	20	21	22	23	24	25	ARMC	Pts	Ref
1988	?	7	Chevy	DAY	ATL; 15	TAL; 36	FRS	PCS	ROC	POC	WIN	KIL	ACS	SLM	POC	TAL; 32	DEL	FRS	ISF	DSF	SLM	ATL							N/A	N/A	
1989	?	07	Chevy	DAY; 20	ATL; 35	KIL	TAL; DNQ	FRS	POC; 28	KIL	HAG	POC; 28	TAL; 40	DEL	FRS	ISF	TOL	DSF	SLM	ATL									N/A	N/A	
1990	?	07	Chevy	DAY; DNQ	ATL	KIL	TAL	FRS	POC	KIL	TOL	HAG	POC	TAL	MCH	ISF	TOL	DSF	WIN	DEL	ATL								N/A	0	
1991	Wally Finney Racing	88	Olds	DAY; 22	ATL; 38	KIL	TAL; 16	TOL	FRS	POC; 20	MCH; 24	KIL	FRS	DEL	POC; 21	TAL; 32	HPT	MCH; 37	ISF	TOL	DSF	TWS; 34	ATL; 27						27th	945	
1992	Boggs Racing	90	Pontiac	DAY	FIF	TWS	TAL	TOL	KIL	POC	MCH; 37	FRS	KIL	NSH	DEL	POC	HPT	FRS	ISF	TOL	DSF	TWS	SLM	ATL					N/A	N/A	
1994	Betty Adams	17	Buick	DAY; 30	TAL	FIF	LVL; 16	KIL	TOL	FRS	MCH; 32	DMS		POC; 25	KIL	FRS	INF												N/A	N/A	
1994	Rick Wentz Racing	76	Pontiac										POC; 24						ISF; 24	DSF; 30	TOL	SLM	WIN	ATL					N/A	N/A	
1994	Roulo Brothers Racing	3	Chevy															I70; 24											N/A	N/A	
1996	Boggs Racing	68	Olds	DAY	ATL	SLM	TAL	FIF	LVL	CLT	CLT	KIL	FRS	POC	MCH	FRS	TOL	POC; 20	MCH; 33	INF	SBS	ISF							N/A	N/A	
1996	Boggs Racing	68	Ford																				DSF; 25	KIL	SLM	WIN	CLT	ATL	N/A	N/A	
1997	Boggs Racing	4	Chevy	DAY; 30	ATL	SLM		CLT; 40	POC; 23	MCH	SBS	TOL	KIL	FRS								CLT; 23	TAL; 40		ATL; 30				N/A	N/A	
1997	Lorz Motorsports	76	Olds				CLT; 27																						N/A	N/A	
1997	Boggs Racing	4	Olds												MIN; 15	POC	MCH							ISF; 6					N/A	N/A	
1997	Boggs Racing	41	Olds															DSF; 38	GTW	SLM	WIN								N/A	N/A	
1998	K&B Motorsports	4	Chevy	DAY; DNQ	ATL; 30		CLT; 32			POC; 34		TOL; 13	PPR; 13	POC; 8				ATL; 25			TEX; 27		CLT; 39		ATL; 26				9th	3860	
1998	Lorz Racing	76	Chevy	DAY; 31																									9th	3860	
1998	K&B Motorsports	4	Olds			SLM; 12		MEM; 14	MCH; 17		SBS; 19				KIL; 8	FRS; 19	ISF; 39		DSF; 34	SLM; 25		WIN; 9		TAL; 26					9th	3860	
1999	K&B Motorsports	4	Chevy	DAY; 19	ATL; 31		AND; 20	CLT; 36	MCH; 40	POC; 19	TOL; 29	SBS	BLN	POC; 33	KIL	FRS	FLM; DNQ					CLT; DNQ	TAL; DNQ	ATL					27th	1365	
1999	K&B Motorsports	4	Pontiac			SLM; 10												ISF; 32	WIN; 29	DSF; DNQ	SLM; DNQ								27th	1365	
2000	White Motorsports	98	Pontiac	DAY	SLM	AND	CLT	KIL	FRS	MCH	POC	TOL	KEN	BLN	POC	WIN	ISF; 30	KEN	DSF; 28	SLM	CLT	TAL	ATL						100th	170	
2001	Richard Skillen	41	Chevy	DAY; DNQ	NSH	WIN	SLM	GTY	KEN																				N/A	0	
2001	White Motorsports	13	Chevy							CLT; DNQ	KAN	MCH	POC	MEM	GLN	KEN	MCH	POC	NSH	ISF	CHI	DSF	SLM	TOL	BLN	CLT	TAL	ATL	N/A	0	
2003	David Boggs Racing	83	Chevy	DAY	ATL	NSH	SLM	TOL	KEN	CLT; 25	BLN	KAN	MCH	LER	POC	POC	NSH												48th	620	
2003	David Boggs Racing	4	Chevy															ISF; 34	WIN										48th	620	
2003	Sarff-Boggs Racing	83	Chevy																	DSF; 25	CHI								48th	620	
2003	Sarff-Boggs Racing	38	Chevy																			SLM; 17	TAL	CLT; 5	SBO				48th	620	
2004	Quarles Racing	07	Ford	DAY	NSH	SLM	KEN	TOL	CLT; DNQ	KAN	POC	MCH	SBO	BLN	KEN	GTW	POC	LER	NSH	ISF	TOL	DSF	CHI	SLM	TAL				N/A	0	
2005	Drew White Motorsports	98	Chevy	DAY	NSH	SLM; DNQ	KEN	TOL; DNQ	LAN; 33	MIL	POC	MCH	KAN	KEN	BLN	POC	GTW	LER	NSH	MCH									99th	250	
2005	Kay Boggs Racing	6	Chevy																		ISF; 32	TOL							99th	250	
2005	Wayne Peterson Racing	6	Chevy																				DSF; 33	CHI	SLM	TAL			99th	250	
2006	Hixson Motorsports	2	Chevy	DAY	NSH	SLM	WIN	KEN	TOL	POC	MCH	KAN	KEN	BLN	POC; 22	GTW	NSH	MCH											44th	880	
2006	Drew White Motorsports	93	Chevy																ISF; 26	MIL; 33	TOL; 33	DSF; 26	CHI; DNQ	SLM; 21	TAL; DNQ	IOW			44th	880	
2007	Boggs Racing	93	Chevy	DAY	USA	NSH	SLM	KAN	WIN	KEN	TOL	IOW	POC	MCH	BLN	KEN	POC	NSH	ISF; 32	MIL	GTW	DSF; 40	CHI	SLM	TAL	TOL			148th	100	
