= 2015 Bojangles' Southern 500 =

Race details
- Race 25 of 36 in the 2015 NASCAR Sprint Cup Series
- Official logo for the race
- Date: September 6, 2015
- Location: Darlington Raceway in Darlington, South Carolina
- Course: Permanent racing facility
- Course length: 1.366 miles (2.198 km)
- Distance: 367 laps, 501.322 mi (806.666 km)
- Weather: Mostly sunny with a temperature of 76 °F (24 °C); wind out of the northeast at 5 mph (8.0 km/h)
- Average speed: 111.993 mph (180.235 km/h)

Pole position
| Driver | Brad Keselowski | Team Penske |
- Time: 27.492

Most laps led
| Driver | Brad Keselowski | Team Penske |
- Laps: 196

Winner
| No. 19 | Carl Edwards | Joe Gibbs Racing |

Television in the United States
- Network: NBC
- Announcers: Rick Allen, Jeff Burton and Steve Letarte
- Nielsen ratings: 3.4/7 (overnight); 3.7/8 (final); 5.9 million viewers

Radio in the United States
- Radio: MRN
- Booth announcers: Joe Moore, Jeff Striegle and Rusty Wallace
- Turn announcers: Dave Moody (1 & 2) and Mike Bagley (3 & 4)

The 2015 Bojangles' Southern 500, the 66th running of the event, was a NASCAR Sprint Cup Series race held on September 6, 2015, at Darlington Raceway in Darlington, South Carolina. Contested over 367 laps on the 1.366 mile (2.198 km) egg-shaped speedway, it was the 25th race of the 2015 NASCAR Sprint Cup Series season. Carl Edwards won the race, the 25th of his career. Brad Keselowski finished second. Denny Hamlin, Joey Logano and Kevin Harvick rounded out the top five.

Keselowski won the pole for the race. He led a race high of 196 laps on his way to a runner–up finish. The race had 24 lead changes among 11 different drivers, as well as 18 caution flag periods for 89 laps.

This was the 25th career victory for Carl Edwards, second of the season, first at Darlington Raceway and fifth at the track for Joe Gibbs Racing. The win moved Edwards up to 12th in the drivers points standings 235 behind Kevin Harvick. Despite being the winning manufacturer, Toyota left Darlington trailing Chevrolet by 63–points in the manufacturer standings.

The Bojangles' Southern 500 was carried by NBC Sports on the broadcast NBC network for the American television audience. The radio broadcast for the race was carried by the Motor Racing Network and Sirius XM NASCAR Radio.

== Report ==
=== Background ===
Layout of Darlington Raceway, the track where the race was held

Darlington Raceway is a 1.366 mi (2.198 km) egg-shaped oval track in Darlington, South Carolina. Kevin Harvick entered Darlington with a 43–point lead over Joey Logano. Dale Earnhardt Jr. entered 89 back. Brad Keselowski entered 115 back. Jimmie Johnson entered 116 back.

==== Return to Labor Day ====
"Auto Club Speedway and Atlanta Motor Speedway did their best to maintain the tradition of Sprint Cup Series racing on the final holiday weekend of the summer, but both came up short. Thankfully, the sanctioning body shuffled a handful of races on this year's schedule to put the Bojangles' Southern 500 back where it began in 1950."source=Motor Racing Network lead writer and co-host of The Morning Drive on Sirius XM NASCAR Radio Pete Pistone giving his thoughts on the return of the Bojangles' Southern 500 to Labor Day weekend

From 1950 to 2003, the Bojangles' Southern 500 was run on Labor Day weekend in late-August or early-September. For the 2004 season, the race (then known as the Mountain Dew Southern 500) was moved to the penultimate race of the season while a second race at Auto Club Speedway was added into the Labor Day spot. The Southern 500 was discontinued as a result of the Ferko lawsuit. Fontana kept the Labor Day weekend date from 2004 to 2009, when it moved to October. Atlanta Motor Speedway moved to the Labor Day spot and remained there from 2009 to 2014. During that time, the spring race (Rebel) would become a 500-mile race and moved up to Mother's Day weekend in May 2005 (when the lineal Rebel 300 was first run in 1957) and remained there for eight years. It then moved to mid-April for 2014. In August of that year, NASCAR announced Darlington's date, which still is the race that traces its lineage to the 1957 Rebel 300, would be held on Labor Day. It was the first time Darlington hosted on the date since 2003.

Members of the NASCAR media gave their thoughts on the return to Labor Day weekend. Pete Pistone of the Motor Racing Network said that Labor Day weekend in Auto Club "never felt right," Labor Day weekend in Atlanta "was better but still not quite there," that Darlington Raceway "fits like a glove" and is "back to where you belong, Bojangles' Southern 500. Don't ever go away again."

In ESPN.com's weekly Turn 4 series, NASCAR analysts and writers Ricky Craven, Ryan McGhee, John Oreovicz, and Bob Pockrass answered the week's question "Why did it take so long for NASCAR to move the Labor Day race back to Darlington[.]" Craven said that he "wasn't sure" but "[f]ew things are more powerful in sports than the power of tradition. This race is synonymous with Labor Day weekend. Moving it to a spring race felt like inviting Santa Claus to Halloween." McGhee said that going back meant "admitting a mistake. NASCAR doesn't like that. Otherwise, we would have gone back to the 2014 aero package six months ago." Oreovicz said it most likely was because NASCAR "doesn't do anything until [they decide] it's a good idea, no matter how popular the idea might be to the masses. But this is another sign that NASCAR is actually listening to its constituents a bit more these days." Pockrass said that "[s]tubbornness and refusal to admit failure" was his guess and that it was "one of NASCAR's most head-scratching moves in trying to build the sport. NASCAR should have never messed with this tradition in the first place. NASCAR didn't belong in California on Labor Day weekend. It didn't belong in Atlanta. It belongs in Darlington, South Carolina. And it's back. Finally."

Jordan Bianchi of SB Nation said that there are traditions that are "just too important. They are the institutions that shouldn't be tampered with under almost any circumstance, worthy of being shared from one generation to the next." He also added that by returning "Darlington to Labor Day weekend, NASCAR has righted a wrong; even if it was a tradition that should have never been abandoned in the first place."

Mike Hembree of USA Today called the initial decision of moving the race from Labor Day weekend "[s]ports blasphemy of the highest order" and its return to Labor Day weekend as being "back where, as people in this farming section of South Carolina will tell you, God meant it to be."

==== Change to the track ====
Since its most recent Sprint Cup Series race in April 2014, Darlington Raceway added 4,600 ft (1,400 m) of additional SAFER barrier to both the front and backstretch walls. This made Darlington the second track on the Sprint Cup schedule, after Bristol, to line the entire circumference of the outside retaining wall with the energy-absorbing barrier.

For this race, NASCAR redesigned the restart zone so that it would be more visible and eliminate driver complaints about "jumped restarts."

==== Aero package ====
For this race, teams used the low-downforce aero package that was used at Kentucky Speedway. This package included a 3 in (7.6 cm) spoiler (reduced from 6 in (15 cm)), a 25 in (64 cm) radiator pan (reduced from 38 in (97 cm)) and a quarter inch (.64 cm) leading edge splitter.

==== New tire compound ====
For this weekend's race, Goodyear brought a softer tire compound to go with the low-downforce package. These changes included different construction and mold shapes for the left-side tires and the right-side tires would provide more grip.

==== Throwback paint schemes ====
In celebration of the event, 32 of the 46 teams entered for this weekend's race unveiled throwback and special paint schemes as part of the return of the Bojangles' Southern 500 to Labor Day weekend. Chip Wile, track president of Darlington Raceway and brainchild of the throwback idea, had initially thought maybe eight or 10 teams could be persuaded to take part in this and get more teams to do it next season. He told Jeff Gluck of USA Today that he thought "this is bigger than what people imagined what it would be in [y]ear [one]" and that he thought "the sport needed this. NASCAR has such a rich history, and we need to celebrate that."

==== Entry list ====
The entry list for the 66th annual Bojangles' Southern 500 was released on Sunday, August 28 at 3:12 p.m. Eastern time. Forty-six drivers were entered for the race. All but the No. 25 Hendrick Motorsports Chevrolet were entered for the previous race at Bristol. Jeb Burton and J. J. Yeley swapped rides at BK Racing with Burton driving the No. 23 Toyota and Yeley driving the No. 26 Toyota. Travis Kvapil drove the No. 30 Chevrolet for The Motorsports Group. Timmy Hill drove the No. 62 Chevrolet for Premium Motorsports. T. J. Bell drove the No. 98 Ford for Premium Motorsports.

| No. | Driver | Team | Manufacturer | Throwback | Starts | Best Finish |
|---|---|---|---|---|---|---|
| 1 | Jamie McMurray | Chip Ganassi Racing | Chevrolet | | 12 | 2nd |
| 2 | Brad Keselowski (PC3) | Team Penske | Ford | Miller High Life Five-time Darlington winner Bobby Allison's Miller High Life car | 6 | 3rd |
| 3 | Austin Dillon | Richard Childress Racing | Chevrolet | American Ethanol Team owner and grandfather Richard Childress' paint scheme during his driving years | 1 | 11th |
| 4 | Kevin Harvick (PC1) | Stewart–Haas Racing | Chevrolet | Budweiser cans in the 1930s | 14 | 1st |
| 5 | Kasey Kahne | Hendrick Motorsports | Chevrolet | HendrickRideAlong.com Geoff Bodine's 1984 scheme, when HMS was known as All-Star Racing | 11 | 3rd |
| 6 | Trevor Bayne | Roush Fenway Racing | Ford | AdvoCare Mark Martin's 1998 car | 0 | – |
| 7 | Alex Bowman | Tommy Baldwin Racing | Chevrolet | Owner Tommy Baldwin Jr.'s father Tom Baldwin's Modified car | 1 | 29th |
| 9 | Sam Hornish Jr. | Richard Petty Motorsports | Ford | Winn-Dixie Mark Martin's Winn-Dixie Busch Series car | 3 | 30th |
| 10 | Danica Patrick | Stewart–Haas Racing | Chevrolet | GoDaddy A black-themed car to symbolize racing at "The Lady in Black" | 3 | 22nd |
| 11 | Denny Hamlin | Joe Gibbs Racing | Toyota | Sport Clips Cale Yarborough's car in the 1970s | 9 | 1st |
| 13 | Casey Mears | Germain Racing | Chevrolet | | 11 | 11th |
| 14 | Tony Stewart (PC4) | Stewart–Haas Racing | Chevrolet | Bass Pro Shops / Mobil 1 Bass Pro Shops' first boat motor and trailer set, the Bass Tracker | 16 | 3rd |
| 15 | Clint Bowyer | Michael Waltrip Racing | Toyota | 5-hour Energy / Peak Buddy Baker tribute scheme | 9 | 9th |
| 16 | Greg Biffle | Roush Fenway Racing | Ford | Ortho Pharmaceutical's first delivery vehicles | 12 | 1st |
| 17 | Ricky Stenhouse Jr. | Roush Fenway Racing | Ford | Cargill David Pearson's scheme | 2 | 18th |
| 18 | Kyle Busch | Joe Gibbs Racing | Toyota | | 10 | 1st |
| 19 | Carl Edwards | Joe Gibbs Racing | Toyota | | 11 | 2nd |
| 20 | Matt Kenseth (PC6) | Joe Gibbs Racing | Toyota | | 16 | 1st |
| 21 | Ryan Blaney (i) | Wood Brothers Racing | Ford | Snap-on A photo compilation of the team's history since 1950 | 0 | – |
| 22 | Joey Logano | Team Penske | Ford | Shell / Pennzoil Mario Andretti's 1988 24 Hours of Le Mans factory Porsche 962C car | 6 | 2nd |
| 23 | Jeb Burton (R) | BK Racing | Toyota | Estes Father Ward Burton's 2001 Southern 500-winning car | 0 | – |
| 24 | Jeff Gordon (PC7) | Hendrick Motorsports | Chevrolet | | 22 | 1st |
| 25 | Chase Elliott (i) | Hendrick Motorsports | Chevrolet | NAPA Auto Parts Father Bill Elliott's 1985 Winston Million-winning car | 0 | – |
| 26 | J. J. Yeley (i) | BK Racing | Toyota | Sam Bass-designed retro Beds for Kids scheme | 7 | 18th |
| 27 | Paul Menard | Richard Childress Racing | Chevrolet | Moen / Menards Inspired by Menards' marketing in the 1970s | 8 | 13th |
| 30 | Travis Kvapil (i) | The Motorsports Group | Chevrolet | | 8 | 8th |
| 31 | Ryan Newman | Richard Childress Racing | Chevrolet | Caterpillar Inc.'s heavy equipment in the 1970s | 13 | 2nd |
| 32 | Josh Wise | Go FAS Racing | Ford | Ricky Craven's Tide-sponsored car from 2003 | 3 | 21st |
| 33 | Mike Bliss (i) | Hillman-Circle Sport LLC | Chevrolet | Harry Gant-inspired car | 4 | 20th |
| 34 | Brett Moffitt (R) | Front Row Motorsports | Ford | | 0 | – |
| 35 | Cole Whitt | Front Row Motorsports | Ford | | 2 | 38th |
| 38 | David Gilliland | Front Row Motorsports | Ford | | 8 | 20th |
| 40 | Landon Cassill (i) | Hillman-Circle Sport LLC | Chevrolet | Snap Fitness / Proud to be an American Sterling Marlin's U.S. flag scheme from 2001 | 4 | 25th |
| 41 | Kurt Busch (PC5) | Stewart–Haas Racing | Chevrolet | Haas CNC Racing's original car, then driven by Jack Sprague | 14 | 3rd |
| 42 | Kyle Larson | Chip Ganassi Racing | Chevrolet | Kyle Petty's 1991–1994 and Days of Thunder protagonist Cole Trickle's Mello Yello paint schemes | 1 | 8th |
| 43 | Aric Almirola | Richard Petty Motorsports | Ford | Richard Petty's STP car from 1972 | 3 | 19th |
| 46 | Michael Annett | HScott Motorsports | Chevrolet | Pilot Corporation's logo from the 1970s | 1 | 42nd |
| 47 | A. J. Allmendinger | JTG Daugherty Racing | Chevrolet | | 7 | 15th |
| 48 | Jimmie Johnson (PC2) | Hendrick Motorsports | Chevrolet | Lowe's 1940s logo | 13 | 1st |
| 51 | Justin Allgaier | HScott Motorsports | Chevrolet | Brandt A. J. Foyt-inspired scheme | 1 | 23rd |
| 55 | David Ragan | Michael Waltrip Racing | Toyota | Aaron's Father Ken Ragan's 1987 car | 8 | 5th |
| 62 | Timmy Hill (i) | Premium Motorsports | Chevrolet | | 7 | 11th |
| 78 | Martin Truex Jr. | Furniture Row Racing | Chevrolet | Furniture Row A teal scheme to promote National Ovarian Cancer Awareness Month | 9 | 5th |
| 83 | Matt DiBenedetto (R) | BK Racing | Toyota | | 0 | – |
| 88 | Dale Earnhardt Jr. | Hendrick Motorsports | Chevrolet | Valvoline Cale Yarborough-inspired car | 15 | 2nd |
| 98 | T. J. Bell | Premium Motorsports | Ford | | 1 | 33rd |
Official initial entry list
Official final entry list

| Key | Meaning |
|---|---|
| (R) | Rookie |
| (i) | Ineligible for points |
| (PC#) | Past champions provisional |

== Practice ==
=== First practice ===
Greg Biffle was the fastest in the first practice with a time of 27.909 and a speed of 176.201 mph (283.568 km/h). This practice session was the first for any car to use a digital dashboard that all cars will be required to use in 2016.

| Pos | No. | Driver | Team | Manufacturer | Time | Speed |
|---|---|---|---|---|---|---|
| 1 | 16 | Greg Biffle | Roush Fenway Racing | Ford | 27.909 | 176.201 |
| 2 | 41 | Kurt Busch | Stewart–Haas Racing | Chevrolet | 27.966 | 175.842 |
| 3 | 14 | Tony Stewart | Stewart–Haas Racing | Chevrolet | 27.982 | 175.710 |
Official first practice results

=== Final practice ===
Brad Keselowski was the fastest in the final practice session with a time of 27.960 and a speed of 175.880 mph (283.051 km/h). Kyle Busch was forced to his backup car after wrecking his primary an hour into the session.

| Pos | No. | Driver | Team | Manufacturer | Time | Speed |
|---|---|---|---|---|---|---|
| 1 | 2 | Brad Keselowski | Team Penske | Ford | 27.960 | 175.880 |
| 2 | 16 | Greg Biffle | Roush Fenway Racing | Ford | 27.984 | 175.729 |
| 3 | 41 | Kurt Busch | Stewart–Haas Racing | Chevrolet | 27.985 | 175.723 |
Official final practice results

== Qualifying ==
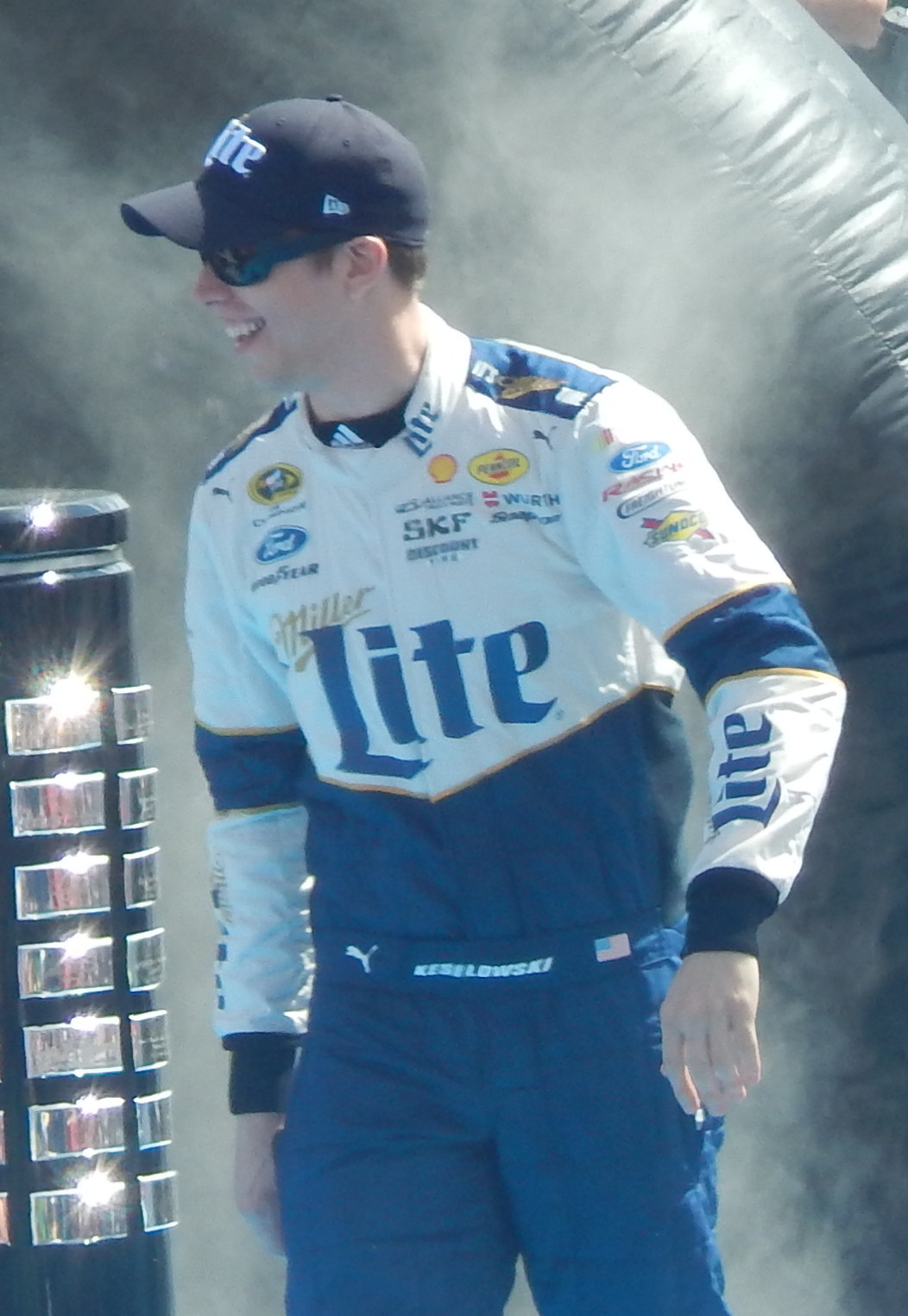
Brad Keselowski, seen here at the 2015 Daytona 500, won the pole for the race.

Brad Keselowski won the pole with a time of 27.492 and a speed of 178.874 mph (287.870 km/h). "I’ve always thought of Darlington as being one of the unique tracks in NASCAR. You look at Bristol, Daytona and Charlotte and Darlington is in the top five of our sport and what it means," Keselowski said. It’s a great accomplishment to me personally." "It’s quite exciting with the way the format is set up with three runs to go for the pole. Each run out you lose so much grip in the tires, it’s a challenge to try to find the right balance and it turns into fun," Kurt Busch said. Our first run out the car was almost too fast. The car almost drove too good." "We were fairly good in the first two rounds. I felt like I could have pushed harder in those two rounds to go faster; and that last round, we just kind of missed the balance on our Chevrolet," Kevin Harvick said. I feel a lot better about it in race trim than I did in qualifying trim. We try to concentrate on that the most because there is so much falloff."

=== Qualifying results ===
| Pos | No. | Driver | Team | Manufacturer | R1 | R2 | R3 |
|---|---|---|---|---|---|---|---|
| 1 | 2 | Brad Keselowski | Team Penske | Ford | 27.482 | 27.442 | 27.492 |
| 2 | 41 | Kurt Busch | Stewart–Haas Racing | Chevrolet | 27.396 | 27.590 | 27.691 |
| 3 | 4 | Kevin Harvick | Stewart–Haas Racing | Chevrolet | 27.526 | 27.540 | 27.718 |
| 4 | 22 | Joey Logano | Team Penske | Ford | 27.417 | 27.541 | 27.733 |
| 5 | 24 | Jeff Gordon | Hendrick Motorsports | Chevrolet | 27.435 | 27.607 | 27.753 |
| 6 | 11 | Denny Hamlin | Joe Gibbs Racing | Toyota | 27.591 | 27.613 | 27.798 |
| 7 | 78 | Martin Truex Jr. | Furniture Row Racing | Chevrolet | 27.600 | 27.681 | 27.807 |
| 8 | 17 | Ricky Stenhouse Jr. | Roush Fenway Racing | Ford | 27.413 | 27.670 | 27.835 |
| 9 | 21 | Ryan Blaney (i) | Wood Brothers Racing | Ford | 27.654 | 27.683 | 27.910 |
| 10 | 18 | Kyle Busch | Joe Gibbs Racing | Toyota | 27.464 | 27.676 | 27.929 |
| 11 | 43 | Aric Almirola | Richard Petty Motorsports | Ford | 27.592 | 27.654 | 27.947 |
| 12 | 27 | Paul Menard | Richard Childress Racing | Chevrolet | 27.632 | 27.662 | 28.053 |
| 13 | 19 | Carl Edwards | Joe Gibbs Racing | Toyota | 27.517 | 27.703 | — |
| 14 | 20 | Matt Kenseth | Joe Gibbs Racing | Toyota | 27.518 | 27.749 | — |
| 15 | 5 | Kasey Kahne | Hendrick Motorsports | Chevrolet | 27.458 | 27.751 | — |
| 16 | 42 | Kyle Larson | Chip Ganassi Racing | Chevrolet | 27.550 | 27.762 | — |
| 17 | 14 | Tony Stewart | Stewart–Haas Racing | Chevrolet | 27.607 | 27.776 | — |
| 18 | 6 | Trevor Bayne | Roush Fenway Racing | Ford | 27.647 | 27.781 | — |
| 19 | 48 | Jimmie Johnson | Hendrick Motorsports | Chevrolet | 27.721 | 27.805 | — |
| 20 | 1 | Jamie McMurray | Chip Ganassi Racing | Chevrolet | 27.539 | 27.851 | — |
| 21 | 55 | David Ragan | Michael Waltrip Racing | Toyota | 27.485 | 27.899 | — |
| 22 | 25 | Chase Elliott (i) | Hendrick Motorsports | Chevrolet | 27.650 | 27.922 | — |
| 23 | 31 | Ryan Newman | Richard Childress Racing | Chevrolet | 27.578 | 27.950 | — |
| 24 | 16 | Greg Biffle | Roush Fenway Racing | Ford | 27.630 | 32.037 | — |
| 25 | 83 | Matt DiBenedetto (R) | BK Racing | Toyota | 27.730 | — | — |
| 26 | 88 | Dale Earnhardt Jr. | Hendrick Motorsports | Chevrolet | 27.783 | — | — |
| 27 | 51 | Justin Allgaier | HScott Motorsports | Chevrolet | 27.783 | — | — |
| 28 | 15 | Clint Bowyer | Michael Waltrip Racing | Toyota | 27.828 | — | — |
| 29 | 3 | Austin Dillon | Richard Childress Racing | Chevrolet | 27.833 | — | — |
| 30 | 10 | Danica Patrick (Note: Danica Patrick started from the rear of the field for switching to a backup car post-qualifying.) | Stewart–Haas Racing | Chevrolet | 27.844 | — | — |
| 31 | 40 | Landon Cassill (i) | Hillman-Circle Sport LLC | Chevrolet | 27.847 | — | — |
| 32 | 13 | Casey Mears | Germain Racing | Chevrolet | 27.860 | — | — |
| 33 | 9 | Sam Hornish Jr. | Richard Petty Motorsports | Ford | 27.882 | — | — |
| 34 | 47 | A. J. Allmendinger | JTG Daugherty Racing | Chevrolet | 27.918 | — | — |
| 35 | 7 | Alex Bowman | Tommy Baldwin Racing | Chevrolet | 27.937 | — | — |
| 36 | 26 | J. J. Yeley (i) | BK Racing | Toyota | 27.944 | — | — |
| 37 | 35 | Cole Whitt | Front Row Motorsports | Ford | 28.075 | — | — |
| 38 | 38 | David Gilliland | Front Row Motorsports | Ford | 28.152 | — | — |
| 39 | 46 | Michael Annett | HScott Motorsports | Chevrolet | 28.161 | — | — |
| 40 | 34 | David Ragan (R) | Front Row Motorsports | Ford | 28.243 | — | — |
| 41 | 23 | Jeb Burton (R) | BK Racing | Toyota | 28.267 | — | — |
| 42 | 33 | Mike Bliss (i) | Hillman-Circle Sport LLC | Chevrolet | 28.433 | — | — |
| 43 | 98 | T. J. Bell | Premium Motorsports | Ford | 28.563 | — | — |
Failed to qualify
| 44 | 32 | Josh Wise | Go FAS Racing | Ford | 28.104 | — | — |
| 45 | 62 | Timmy Hill (i) | Premium Motorsports | Chevrolet | 28.199 | — | — |
| 46 | 30 | Travis Kvapil (i) | The Motorsports Group | Chevrolet | 28.213 | — | — |
Official qualifying results

== Race ==
=== First half ===
==== Start ====
Under overcast South Carolina evening skies, Brad Keselowski led the field to the green flag at 7:24 p.m. and led the first lap. He pulled to a one-second lead over Kevin Harvick after five laps. The first caution of the race flew on lap 7 for a three-car spin on the backstretch. This began when Brett Moffitt hit the wall while exiting turn 2. In an accordion fashion, Cole Whitt slammed into the rear of his car and Chase Elliott slammed into the rear of his car, sending both of them in a spin.

The race restarted on lap 14. Unlike last year's race, the bottom line appeared to be the preferred restart lane. Unlike the initial start, Keselowski didn't simply pull away as Kurt Busch reeled him in. Suddenly, Matt Kenseth, running third, got real sideways and slapped the wall exiting turn 2. This gave him an unscheduled stop three laps later. Eventually, Keselowski began to pull away from Busch. The second caution flew on lap 44 when Ryan Newman got loose in turn 3, saved it, got loose again, and spun out in turn 4.

The race restarted on lap 51. Debris on the frontstretch brought out the third caution on lap 61. Kasey Kahne opted to make just a two-tire pit stop and exited with the lead. Carl Edwards opted not to pit and assumed that position, putting Kahne in second.

The race restarted on lap 66. That same lap, Edwards was passed by Kahne for the lead. Three laps later, Denny Hamlin, on four new tires, passed Kahne for the lead. The fourth caution flew on lap 108 when Michael Annett got loose in turn 2 and spun down the backstretch.

==== Second quarter ====
The race restarted on lap 115. Keselowski drove around the outside of Hamlin in turn 2 to take the lead on lap 119. The fifth caution flew on lap 122 when Mike Bliss cut down his right-front tire on the backstretch and slammed the wall in turn 3. Kyle Busch opted not to pit and assumed the lead.

The race restarted on lap 125. The sixth caution flew on that same lap when J. J. Yeley apparently made contact with Annett in turn 3 and destroyed the protective foam on the driver's side of his car.

The race restarted on lap 133. The seventh caution of the race flew on lap 134 when Jimmie Johnson drifted down into the path of Joey Logano and spun out exiting turn 4.

The race restarted on lap 139. Harvick used the outside to take the lead the next lap, but gave it back to Keselowski on the next lap. The eighth caution of the race flew on lap 165 when Trevor Bayne made heavy contact with Danica Patrick. Trying to get down on pit road, his tires blew and he spun out.

The race restarted on lap 170. Debris on the backstretch brought out the ninth caution of the race on lap 189. This came from when Patrick got loose and slammed the wall exiting turn 4. "I didn’t feel out of control out there," Patrick said. "I felt like I was in a pretty decent rhythm. It snapped pretty hard in (Turn) 4. So, I don’t know, I mean they said it looked like it snapped pretty hard. It felt like that it was definitely more sudden and something that I wasn’t expecting. It is definitely possible that it just got loose. For a few laps before that I felt like I could pull the yaw pretty easily through (Turns) 3 and 4. The one thing about Darlington is you definitely run a lot of lines here. I was running – I felt better lower than higher, so at times I was a lane or two below the dotted line. Debris is just something that happens here because we are using so much track, but I’m not 100 percent sure could have just got loose. But, it could have been a cut tire too, just not sure. It’s a bummer." Tony Stewart was tagged for speeding on pit road and restarted the race from the rear of the field.

=== Second half ===
==== Halfway ====
The race restarted on lap 195. The 10th caution of the race flew on lap 198 when Ricky Stenhouse Jr. got loose, slid down the track, and slammed the inside wall in turn 4. There, T. J. Bell and Alex Bowman made contact and both slammed the wall.

The race restarted on lap 203. Kurt Busch drove past Keselowski exiting turn 2 to take the lead. The 11th caution of the race flew on lap 208 when Kyle Busch apparently made contact with Greg Biffle sending both spinning. Kyle Larson opted not to pit and assumed the lead.

The race restarted on lap 212. Larson was passed by Stewart for the lead. Later, Hamlin drove under Stewart to retake that position on lap 223. The 12th caution of the race flew on lap 229 when Elliott blew his right-front tire out and hit the outside wall. Hamlin swapped the lead with Harvick on pit road as the former pitted before the start/finish line, and the latter left pit road with the lead.

The race restarted on lap 238. The 13th caution of the race flew on lap 246 when Trevor Bayne cut down his right-rear tire and spun in turn 4. Logano opted not to pit and assumed the lead.

The race restarted on lap 252. The 14th caution of the race flew on lap 265 when David Ragan got loose, slid down the track, and hit the inside wall on the frontstretch. Kyle Busch opted not to pit and assumed the lead.

The race restarted on lap 270. Busch botched the restart and Joey Logano retook the lead. The 15th caution of the race flew on lap 279 when Ragan got hooked into the outside wall by Paul Menard, turned down the track, and slammed the inside wall.

==== Fourth quarter ====
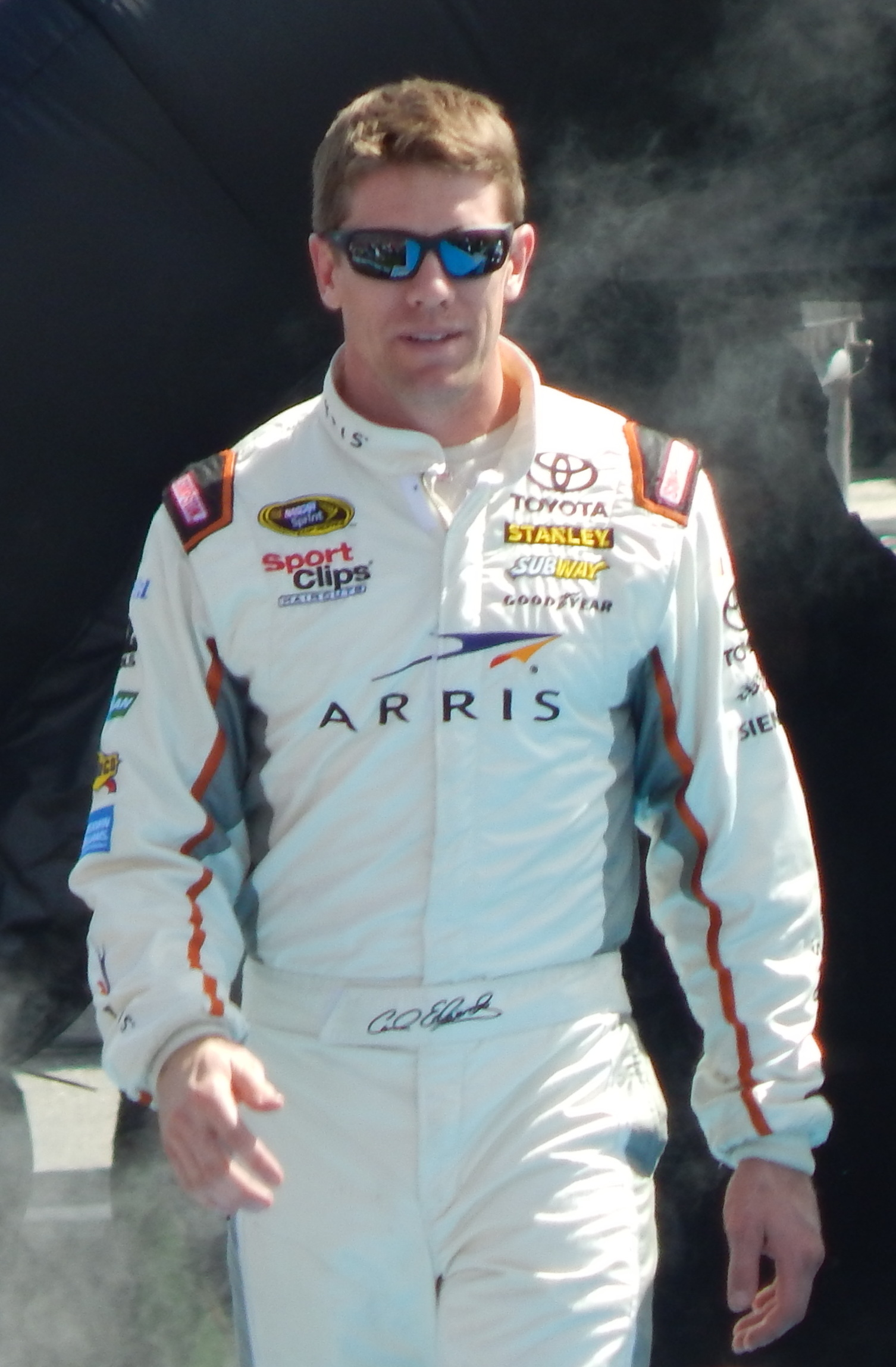
Carl Edwards, seen here at the 2015 Daytona 500, scored his 25th career victory in the Bojangles' Southern 500.

The race restarted on lap 283. Debris in turn 1 brought out the 16th caution of the race on lap 300. Keselowski beat Harvick off pit road to retake the lead.

The race restarted on lap 306. The 17th caution of the race flew with 60 laps to go when Martin Truex Jr. tapped the rear of Kurt Busch and sent him spinning.

The race restarted with 55 laps to go. With 50 to go, Harvick began putting pressure on race leader Keselowski. He had the momentum to pull off the pass exiting turn 2 with 45 to go, but he bobbled on the exit and Keselowski remained in the lead. Edwards pulled to Harvick and began pressuring him for second. Edwards edged Keselowski at the line with 22 laps to go and Brad took back the lead the next lap. The 18th caution of the race, a new track record, came out with 13 laps to go when Jeb Burton made contact with Johnson and spun out. This was a new world record for the most cautions in the Southern 500. Edwards beat Keselowski off pit road to retake the lead.

The race restarted with eight laps to go. Edwards drove off to score his 25th career victory at Darlington Raceway.

== Post-race ==
=== Driver comments ===
"This is the style of racing that I love," Edwards said. "If there's any chance we can do it in the Chase, I hope, I hope we can do it."

"Just one spot short at the end," Keselowski said. "We're right there. We've just got to find one more level to win these races and win this championship."

"We had a great Budweiser-Jimmy John's Chevrolet. I'm really happy about that part. I'm really disappointed with how pit road went tonight," Kevin Harvick said after a fifth-place finish. "All in all the car performed well and we were in the race, we just got behind with eight laps to go. "We ran well. We just didn't perform on pit road tonight."

After finishing seventh, Kyle Busch locked himself into the Chase. "We weren’t looking so good after Michigan,’’ Busch said of the 43rd-place finish in the June race. "It was really doom and gloom. I was bumming. I just wasn’t sure what to do. I wasn’t sure what was going on. It took a little bit of that time to get the rust knocked off, I guess. It’s probably the longest I’ve been out of the race car in my life. That was a tough lick.’’

"We lost the handling late in the race and went backwards," said Martin Truex Jr. after finishing ninth. "We were a top-five car all night and to come away ninth is disappointing. We just didn't have the grip at the end to run closer to the front. I would feel better about the team record had we finished in the top-five."

=== Media comments ===
"The second race with a lower downforce aerodynamic package didn’t seem to have the overall dramatic results like what was seen at Kentucky in July. Certainly a huge part of the reason is the unique layout of Darlington, which is nowhere near as wide as Kentucky or has a racing surface as worn out. But there were some interesting battles for position during the 500-mile grind, particularly in the closing laps. However, the drivers were very optimistic heading into the race and gave it glowing reviews after the race. Overall it appears this is the direction NASCAR will head in creating 2016 rules packages. Goodyear’s tire seemed to perfectly fit the package and drivers needed to manage their rubber all race long to combat fall off. The sanctioning body will sift through the data acquired from Sunday’s race and solicit input from the garage area before making any final decisions.’’

— Motor Racing Network lead writer and co-host of The Morning Drive on Sirius XM NASCAR Radio Pete Pistone giving his thoughts on the Bojangles' Southern 500.

Members of the NASCAR media gave their opinions of the second race with the low-downforce aero package. Pete Pistone, lead writer for the Motor Racing Network and co-host of The Morning Drive on Sirius XM NASCAR Radio, said that this race "didn’t seem to have the overall dramatic results like what was seen at Kentucky in July," but that "there were some interesting battles for position during the 500-mile grind, particularly in the closing laps" and that "the drivers were very optimistic heading into the race and gave it glowing reviews after the race."

Jeff Gluck of USA Today said that while "the Southern 500 was a grueling marathon and a caution fest that lasted more than four and a half hours..., it also was a very entertaining race that featured tight battles for the lead and the kind of tire falloff that helped NASCAR rise to popularity in the first place." He also said that it was "exactly what the sport needed – confirmation the package is indeed the right direction to go after Kentucky already was a major success."

Jim Utter of Motorsport.com, factoring in the opinions of drivers and NASCAR on the package, said that if there was "such a thing as a consensus in NASCAR, the low-downforce aerodynamics package debuted at Kentucky earlier this season may be as close as the sport gets to it."

John Oreovicz of ESPN.com said "the star of the show was NASCAR's low drag aero package" and that "[i]f the high-drag package run at Indianapolis and Michigan can almost unquestionably be called a failure, the low-drag package has proven to provide almost everything the drivers have asked for.

Larry McReynolds of Fox Sports said he doesn't "know how in the world anybody can complain about what we saw at Darlington on Sunday night" and that while he understands "the race was long...the racing was good. I know there will be some debate about a four-and-a-half-hour race. I am normally the one that's beating the drum that we don't need to be doing that as our society has outgrown that. This was a very special event, and I don't think it needs to change."

Darrell Waltrip of Fox Sports said he thought "Sunday was a great example of why there is so much passion within our sport about Darlington" and that he thought "the aero package seems to be the way to go. It worked at Kentucky and it seemed to work Sunday night. These cars have a lot of downforce built into the body anyway, so we don't need that big huge spoiler on the back of the car."

Nate Ryan of NBC Sports said that it would "be better if NASCAR bravely calls an audible for the Chase and institutes the low-downforce package that met with smashingly positive reviews at Kentucky Speedway and Darlington Raceway. The mantra from NASCAR over the past six years has been that fan satisfaction should supersede everything in determining its direction. Whether installing double-file restarts or making three attempts at a green-white-checkered finish, there often has been little fair to competitors about the recent initiatives aimed at increasing the entertainment value. The same concept holds true for low downforce."

== Race results ==
| Pos | No. | Driver | Team | Manufacturer | Laps | Points |
|---|---|---|---|---|---|---|
| 1 | 19 | Carl Edwards | Joe Gibbs Racing | Toyota | 367 | 47 |
| 2 | 2 | Brad Keselowski | Team Penske | Ford | 367 | 44 |
| 3 | 11 | Denny Hamlin | Joe Gibbs Racing | Toyota | 367 | 42 |
| 4 | 22 | Joey Logano | Team Penske | Ford | 367 | 41 |
| 5 | 4 | Kevin Harvick | Stewart–Haas Racing | Chevrolet | 367 | 40 |
| 6 | 41 | Kurt Busch | Stewart–Haas Racing | Chevrolet | 367 | 39 |
| 7 | 18 | Kyle Busch | Joe Gibbs Racing | Toyota | 367 | 38 |
| 8 | 88 | Dale Earnhardt Jr. | Hendrick Motorsports | Chevrolet | 367 | 36 |
| 9 | 78 | Martin Truex Jr. | Furniture Row Racing | Chevrolet | 367 | 35 |
| 10 | 42 | Kyle Larson | Chip Ganassi Racing | Chevrolet | 367 | 35 |
| 11 | 43 | Aric Almirola | Richard Petty Motorsports | Ford | 367 | 33 |
| 12 | 5 | Kasey Kahne | Hendrick Motorsports | Chevrolet | 367 | 33 |
| 13 | 31 | Ryan Newman | Richard Childress Racing | Chevrolet | 367 | 31 |
| 14 | 1 | Jamie McMurray | Chip Ganassi Racing | Chevrolet | 367 | 30 |
| 15 | 14 | Tony Stewart | Stewart–Haas Racing | Chevrolet | 367 | 30 |
| 16 | 24 | Jeff Gordon | Hendrick Motorsports | Chevrolet | 367 | 28 |
| 17 | 15 | Clint Bowyer | Michael Waltrip Racing | Toyota | 367 | 27 |
| 18 | 16 | Greg Biffle | Roush Fenway Racing | Ford | 367 | 26 |
| 19 | 48 | Jimmie Johnson | Hendrick Motorsports | Chevrolet | 367 | 25 |
| 20 | 40 | Landon Cassill (i) | Hillman-Circle Sport LLC | Chevrolet | 367 | 0 |
| 21 | 20 | Matt Kenseth | Joe Gibbs Racing | Toyota | 367 | 23 |
| 22 | 3 | Austin Dillon | Richard Childress Racing | Chevrolet | 367 | 22 |
| 23 | 47 | A. J. Allmendinger | JTG Daugherty Racing | Chevrolet | 367 | 21 |
| 24 | 7 | Alex Bowman | Tommy Baldwin Racing | Chevrolet | 367 | 20 |
| 25 | 83 | Matt DiBenedetto (R) | BK Racing | Toyota | 367 | 19 |
| 26 | 27 | Paul Menard | Richard Childress Racing | Chevrolet | 367 | 18 |
| 27 | 38 | David Gilliland | Front Row Motorsports | Ford | 367 | 17 |
| 28 | 9 | Sam Hornish Jr. | Richard Petty Motorsports | Ford | 367 | 16 |
| 29 | 13 | Casey Mears | Germain Racing | Chevrolet | 366 | 15 |
| 30 | 21 | Ryan Blaney (i) | Wood Brothers Racing | Ford | 366 | 0 |
| 31 | 23 | Jeb Burton (R) | BK Racing | Toyota | 364 | 13 |
| 32 | 33 | Mike Bliss (i) | Hillman-Circle Sport LLC | Chevrolet | 363 | 0 |
| 33 | 51 | Justin Allgaier | HScott Motorsports | Chevrolet | 354 | 11 |
| 34 | 26 | J. J. Yeley (i) | BK Racing | Toyota | 348 | 0 |
| 35 | 6 | Trevor Bayne | Roush Fenway Racing | Ford | 342 | 9 |
| 36 | 34 | Brett Moffitt (R) | Front Row Motorsports | Ford | 332 | 8 |
| 37 | 98 | T. J. Bell | Premium Motorsports | Ford | 325 | 7 |
| 38 | 17 | Ricky Stenhouse Jr. | Roush Fenway Racing | Ford | 313 | 6 |
| 39 | 46 | Michael Annett | HScott Motorsports | Chevrolet | 300 | 5 |
| 40 | 55 | David Ragan | Michael Waltrip Racing | Toyota | 275 | 4 |
| 41 | 25 | Chase Elliott (i) | Hendrick Motorsports | Chevrolet | 227 | 0 |
| 42 | 10 | Danica Patrick | Stewart–Haas Racing | Chevrolet | 190 | 2 |
| 43 | 35 | Cole Whitt | Front Row Motorsports | Ford | 5 | 1 |
Official Bojangles' Southern 500 results

=== Race statistics ===
- 24 lead changes among 11 different drivers
- 18 cautions for 89 laps
- Time of race: 4 hours, 28 minute, 35 seconds
- Average speed: 111.993 mph (180.235 km/h)
- Carl Edwards took home $285,225 in winnings

Lap Leaders
| Laps | Leader |
|---|---|
| 1-62 | Brad Keselowski |
| 63-65 | Carl Edwards |
| 66-67 | Kasey Kahne |
| 68-109 | Denny Hamlin |
| 110 | Kevin Harvick |
| 111-117 | Denny Hamlin |
| 118-137 | Brad Keselowski |
| 138-139 | Kevin Harvick |
| 140-193 | Brad Keselowski |
| 194 | Kurt Busch |
| 195-202 | Brad Keselowski |
| 203-208 | Kurt Busch |
| 209-211 | Kyle Larson |
| 212-221 | Tony Stewart |
| 222-229 | Denny Hamlin |
| 230-247 | Kevin Harvick |
| 248-266 | Joey Logano |
| 267-269 | Kyle Busch |
| 270-279 | Joey Logano |
| 280-302 | Kevin Harvick |
| 303 | David Gilliland |
| 304-344 | Brad Keselowski |
| 345 | Carl Edwards |
| 346-356 | Brad Keselowski |
| 357-367 | Carl Edwards |

Total laps led
| Leader | Laps |
|---|---|
| Brad Keselowski | 196 |
| Denny Hamlin | 57 |
| Kevin Harvick | 44 |
| Joey Logano | 29 |
| Carl Edwards | 15 |
| Tony Stewart | 10 |
| Kurt Busch | 7 |
| Kyle Busch | 3 |
| Kyle Larson | 3 |
| Kasey Kahne | 2 |
| David Gilliland | 1 |

==== Race awards ====
- Coors Light Pole Award: Brad Keselowski (27.492, 178.874 mph (287.870 km/h))
- 3M Lap Leader: Brad Keselowski (196 laps)
- American Ethanol Green Flag Restart Award: Brad Keselowski
- Duralast Brakes "Bake In The Race" Award: Brad Keselowski
- Freescale "Wide Open": Carl Edwards
- Ingersoll Rand Power Move: Kurt Busch (9 positions)
- MAHLE Clevite Engine Builder of the Race: Roush-Yates Engines, #2
- Mobil 1 Driver of the Race: Brad Keselowski (137.4 driver rating)
- Moog Steering and Suspension Problem Solver of The Race: Carl Edwards (crew chief Darian Grubb (0.228 seconds))
- NASCAR Sprint Cup Leader Bonus: No winner: rolls over to $220,000 at next event
- Sherwin-Williams Fastest Lap: Matt Kenseth (Lap 4, 28.145, 174.724 mph (281.191 km/h))
- Sunoco Rookie of The Race: Matt DiBenedetto

== Media ==
=== Television ===
NBC Sports covered the race on the television side. Rick Allen, two–time Darlington winner Jeff Burton and Steve Letarte had the call in the booth for the race. As part of the throwback weekend, Ken Squier, Ned Jarrett and Dale Jarrett also called a portion of the race. Dave Burns, Mike Massaro, Marty Snider and Kelli Stavast handled pit road on the television side.

NBC
| Booth announcers | Pit reporters |
|---|---|
| Lap-by-lap: Rick Allen and Ken Squier; Color-commentator: Jeff Burton and Ned Jarrett; Color-commentator: Steve Letarte and Dale Jarrett | Dave Burns; Mike Massaro; Marty Snider; Kelli Stavast |

=== Radio ===
MRN had the radio call for the race, which was simulcast on Sirius XM NASCAR Radio. Joe Moore, Jeff Striegle and Rusty Wallace called the race from the booth when the field was racing down the front stretch. Dave Moody called the race from a billboard outside of turn 2 when the field was racing through turns 1 and 2. Mike Bagley called the race from atop the Darlington Raceway Club outside of turn 3 when the field was racing through turns 3 and 4. Alex Hayden, Winston Kelley and Steve Post worked pit road on the radio side.

MRN
| Booth announcers | Turn announcers | Pit reporters |
|---|---|---|
| Lead announcer: Joe Moore; Announcer: Jeff Striegle; Announcer: Rusty Wallace | Turns 1 & 2: Dave Moody; Turns 3 & 4: Mike Bagley | Alex Hayden; Winston Kelley; Steve Post |

== Standings after the race ==
Drivers' Championship standings

| | Pos | Driver | Points |
|---|---|---|---|
| | 1 | Kevin Harvick | 948 |
| | 2 | Joey Logano | 906 (–42) |
| | 3 | Dale Earnhardt Jr. | 855 (–93) |
| | 4 | Brad Keselowski | 837 (–111) |
| | 5 | Jimmie Johnson | 817 (–131) |
| | 6 | Martin Truex Jr. | 806 (–142) |
| | 7 | Matt Kenseth | 776 (–172) |
| 1 | 8 | Denny Hamlin | 754 (–194) |
| 1 | 9 | Kurt Busch | 752 (–196) |
| | 10 | Jamie McMurray | 726 (–222) |
| | 11 | Ryan Newman | 714 (–234) |
| 2 | 12 | Carl Edwards | 713 (–235) |
| | 13 | Jeff Gordon | 700 (–248) |
| 2 | 14 | Paul Menard | 692 (–256) |
| | 15 | Clint Bowyer | 682 (–266) |
| | 16 | Aric Almirola | 653 (–295) |

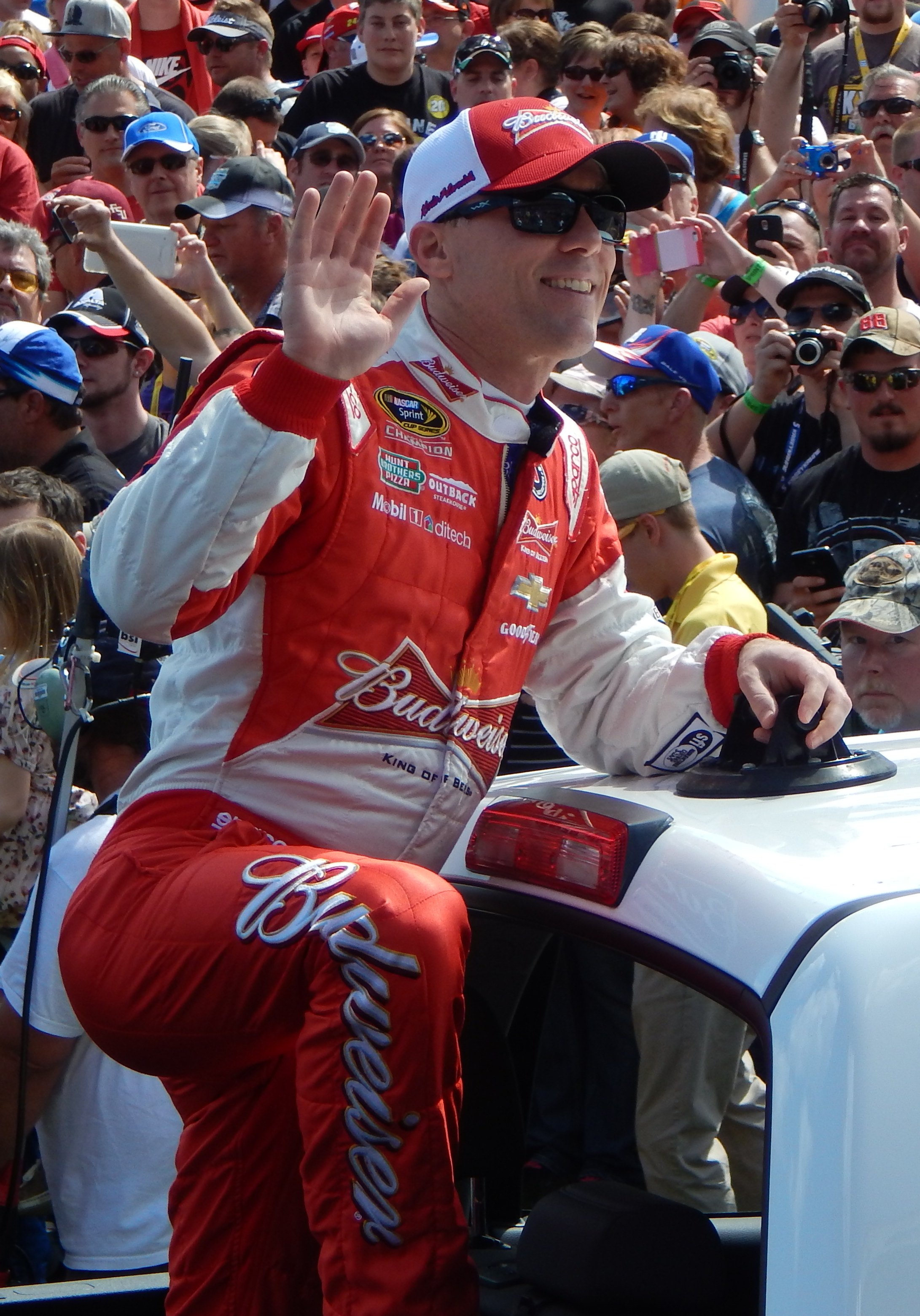
Kevin Harvick left Darlington with a 42–point lead over Joey Logano.

Manufacturers' Championship standings

| Pos | Manufacturer | Points |
|---|---|---|
| 1 | Chevrolet | 1,106 |
| 2 | Toyota | 1,043 (–63) |
| 3 | Ford | 1,039 (–67) |

- Note: Only the first sixteen positions are included for the driver standings.

== Note ==
፤፤

| Previous race: 2015 Irwin Tools Night Race | Sprint Cup Series; 2015 season | Next race: 2015 Federated Auto Parts 400 |
