= 1963 Western North Carolina 500 =

Auto race held at Asheville-Weaverville Speedway in 1963

Race details
- Race 41 of 55 in the 1963 NASCAR Grand National Series season
- Date: August 11, 1963; 62 years ago
- Official name: Western North Carolina 500
- Location: Asheville-Weaverville Speedway, Weaverville, North Carolina
- Course: Permanent racing facility
- Course length: 0.500 miles (0.804 km)
- Distance: 500 laps, 250 mi (310 km)
- Weather: Mild with temperatures of 78.1 °F (25.6 °C); wind speeds of 15 miles per hour (24 km/h)
- Average speed: 77.603 miles per hour (124.890 km/h)
- Attendance: 14,500

Pole position
| Driver | Ned Jarrett | Charles Robinson |

Most laps led
| Driver | Fred Lorenzen | Holman Moody |
- Laps: 452

Winner
| No. 28 | Fred Lorenzen | Holman Moody |

Television in the United States
- Network: untelevised
- Announcers: none

The 1963 Western North Carolina 500 was a NASCAR Grand National Series event that was held on August 11, 1963, at Asheville-Weaverville Speedway in Weaverville, North Carolina.

The transition to purpose-built racecars began in the early 1960s and occurred gradually over that decade. Changes made to the sport by the late 1960s brought an end to the "strictly stock" vehicles of the 1950s.

== Race report ==
The race took three hours and thirteen minutes to successfully complete; qualifying trials rained out, so Fred Lorenzen got the pole by the luck of the draw. Fred Lorenzen won the race with an average speed of 77.673 miles per hour (125.003 km/h) and defeated Richard Petty by outlapping him once. Five hundred laps were done on an oval track spanning 0.500 miles (0.805 km) in front of 14500 live spectators. Total winnings for this race were $13,765 ($144,757 when adjusted for inflation) while Lorenzen walked away as the biggest cash earner with a $2,550 paycheck ($26,817 when adjusted for inflation). Possum Jones (the last place finisher) came home from the race with a meager $150 ($1,577 when adjusted for inflation) as a result of only completely eight laps of the race due to a fuel leak.

A balanced mixture of Ford vehicles in addition to vehicles from the Plymouth, Dodge and Chevrolet brands kept the race interesting for people who were looking to buy a new automobile during the early 1960s. Chrysler's lone entry was with driver Major Melton who had to leave the race after 324 laps due to a problem with his grease seal. A lot of the team owners in the race were wealthy individuals who had the money to cope with the constant traveling expenses that were expected in a NASCAR season.

Tommy Irwin would never race in a NASCAR Cup Series race after this one due to his lackluster performance. Constant vibrations in his vehicles forced him off the track after 264 laps; Stewart McKinney was his faithful crew chief. McKinney's crew chief career only lasted throughout 1963 with six good finishes for his stable of five NASCAR drivers. Other crew chiefs involved in the race were Crawford Clements, Frank McMillion, Herb Nab, Herman Beam, and Ray Fox.

=== Timeline ===
Section reference:

- Start of race: Fred Lorenzen started the race with the pole position but was quickly overtaken by Ned Jarrett.
- Lap 8: Racing fuel was leaking from Possum Jones' car, causing him to leave the event.
- Lap 30: Stick Elliott had a terminal crash, forcing him to withdraw from the event.
- Lap 14: Fred Lorenzen takes over the lead from Ned Jarrett.
- Lap 189: Richard Petty takes over the lead from Fred Lorenzen.
- Lap 199: Lee Reitzel had a terminal crash, forcing him to withdraw from the event.
- Lap 216: G.C. Spencer had a terminal crash, forcing him to withdraw from the event.
- Lap 224: Fred Lorenzen takes over the lead from Richard Petty.
- Lap 379: Elmo Langley had problems with his vehicle's engine, forcing him to exit the race.
- Finish: Fred Lorenzen was officially declared the winner of the event.

=== Finishing order ===
Section reference:

1. Fred Lorenzen (No. 28)
2. Richard Petty (No. 43)
3. Jim Paschal (No. 42)
4. David Pearson (No. 6)
5. Billy Wade (No. 5)
6. Jack Smith (No. 47)
7. Buck Baker (No. 87)
8. Joe Weatherly (No. 36)
9. Ned Jarrett (No. 11)
10. Buddy Baker (No. 2)
11. Wendell Scott (No. 34)
12. Red Wickersham (No. 67)
13. Worth McMillion (No. 83)
14. Cale Yarborough (No. 19)
15. Elmo Langley* (No. 09)
16. Roy Mayne (No. 33)
17. Major Melton* (No. 88)
18. Bobby Isaac* (No. 99)
19. Tommy Irwin* (No. 44)
20. Curtis Crider* (No. 62)
21. G.C. Spencer* (No. 48)
22. Lee Reitzel* (No. 93)
23. Junior Johnson* (No. 3)
24. Bobby Keck* (No. 57)
25. Jimmy Pardue* (No. 54)
26. Stick Elliott* (No. 18)
27. Possum Jones* (No. 05)

* Driver failed to finish race

| Preceded by 1963 Sandlapper 200 | NASCAR Grand National Series; 1963 | Succeeded by 1963 untitled race at Piedmont Interstate Fairgrounds |
