= 1972 World 600 =

Auto race held at Charlotte Motor Speedway in 1972

Race details
- Race 12 of 31 in the 1972 NASCAR Winston Cup Series season
- Layout of Charlotte Motor Speedway
- Date: May 28, 1972
- Location: Charlotte Motor Speedway, Concord, North Carolina
- Course: Permanent racing facility
- Course length: 1.500 miles (2.410 km)
- Distance: 400 laps, 600 mi (965 km)
- Weather: Temperatures reaching of 73.9 °F (23.3 °C); wind speeds of 14 miles per hour (23 km/h)
- Average speed: 142.255 miles per hour (228.937 km/h)

Pole position
Driver	Bobby Allison	Howard & Egerton Racing
- Time: 34.142

Most laps led
Driver	Bobby Allison	Howard & Egerton Racing
- Laps: 239

Winner
No. 11	Buddy Baker	Petty Enterprises

Television in the United States
- Network: untelevised
- Announcers: none

The 1972 World 600, the 13th running of the event, was a NASCAR Winston Cup Series racing event that was held on May 28, 1972, at Charlotte Motor Speedway in Concord, North Carolina. Wendell Scott was promised a good car, what he actually got was a hunk of junk. In practice, the car was 9 miles per hour off the pace; this led to jeers from his fellow drivers that he just could not drive the best level of equipment that was available at the time. Bobby Allison climbed in the car afterward and went the same speed while Wendell did the best he could with it until the engine grenaded. This resulted in Wendell obtaining a result of 22nd place DNF on lap 283.

South Carolina's blue laws were in full force during the era of the race. The pace car driver was Robert "Bob" Colvin who was nearly arrested for violating the "blue laws" before he found out that they were for someone else's bad checks.

In addition to watching the event live, NASCAR followers who either lived or visited the Concord, North Carolina region could listen to it on their transistor radios.

== Race report ==
It took four hours and thirteen minutes to race 400 spanning 1.500 miles (2.414 km) per lap. Amateur home video helped capture the most important 49 minutes of this event. Three cautions were waved for 24 laps. More than 80,000 spectators would see Buddy Baker defeat Bobby Allison by 24 seconds at speeds averaging 142.555 miles per hour or 229.420 kilometres per hour. The pole position speed would be 158.162 miles per hour or 254.537 kilometres per hour. Jim Vandiver would become the last-place finisher due to a transmission problem on lap 11.

James Hylton became the lowest-finishing driver to finish this race. Richard Petty would suffer an engine problem. His first win from the World 600 (now Coca-Cola 600) series of racing events would come in 1975. Larry Smith, who would go on to become NASCAR's Rookie of the Year, finished sixth in this race. A Rookie of the Year from 1957, Ken Rush, would make his final NASCAR Cup Series appearance in this event. He would make a 29th-place finish out of a 31st place start. Long-time NASCAR driver Jim Paschal would make his final start as well.

Out of the 40-car grid, all except Formula 1 driver Jackie Oliver were born in the United States. Oliver was born in Walton-on-Thames, England.

Notable crew chiefs included Harry Hyde, Dale Inman, Tom Vandiver, Darrell Bryant, and Lee Gordon.

=== Qualifying ===
Grid	No.	Driver	Manufacturer	Speed	Qualifying time	Owner
1	12	Bobby Allison	'72 Chevrolet	158.162	34.142	Richard Howard
2	21	David Pearson	'71 Mercury	158.051	34.166	Wood Brothers
3	71	Bobby Isaac	'72 Dodge	156.109	34.591	Nord Krauskopf
4	31	Jim Vandiver	'70 Dodge	155.889	34.640	O.L. Nixon
5	18	Joe Frasson	'71 Dodge	155.704	34.681	Joe Frasson
6	11	Buddy Baker	'72 Dodge	155.150	34.805	Petty Enterprises
7	14	Coo Coo Marlin	'72 Chevrolet	155.141	34.807	H.B. Cunningham
8	16	Dave Marcis	'72 AMC Matador	153.396	35.203	Roger Penske
9	43	Richard Petty	'72 Dodge	153.061	35.280	Petty Enterprises
10	28	Fred Lorenzen	'72 Ford	152.883	35.321	Hoss Ellington

== Finishing order ==
Section reference:

1. Buddy Baker† (#11)
2. Bobby Allison† (#12)
3. Charlie Glotzbach† (#6)
4. Benny Parsons† (#72)
5. LeeRoy Yarbrough† (#45)
6. Larry Smith† (#92)
7. Buddy Arrington† (#67)
8. Cecil Gordon† (#24)
9. Frank Warren (#79)
10. Ben Arnold† (#76)
11. Elmo Langley† (#64)
12. Ron Keselowski (#88)
13. Raymond Williams (#47)
14. Jabe Thomas† (#25)
15. Walter Ballard† (#30)
16. Jim Paschal*† (#27)
17. Dean Dalton (#7)
18. Fred Lorenzen*† (#28)
19. Richard Petty* (#43)
20. James Hylton† (#48)
21. Joe Frasson*† (#18)
22. Wendell Scott*† (#34)
23. Bobby Isaac*† (#71)
24. John Sears*† (#4)
25. David Pearson*† (#21)
26. Bill Champion*† (#10)
27. Clarence Lovell*† (#61)
28. Coo Coo Marlin*† (#14)
29. Ken Rush*† (#2)
30. Richard D. Brown*† (#91)
31. Dave Marcis* (#16)
32. Jackie Oliver* (#90)
33. J.D. McDuffie*† (#70)
34. Donnie Allison* (#15)
35. Neil Castles*† (#06)
36. Dick Brooks*† (#73)
37. Wayne Smith*† (#33)
38. David Ray Boggs* (#57)
39. G.C. Spencer*† (#49)
40. Jim Vandiver*† (#31)

* Driver failed to finish race
† signifies that the driver is known to be deceased

Preceded by 1972 Winston 500	NASCAR Winston Cup Series Season; 1972	Succeeded by 1972 Mason-Dixon 500

Preceded by 1971	World 600 races 1972	Succeeded by 1973
