= Goodyear 400 =

Auto race held in spring in Darlington, United States

NASCAR Cup Series
- Venue: Darlington Raceway
- Location: Darlington, South Carolina, United States
- Corporate sponsor: Goodyear Tire and Rubber Company
- First race: 1952; 1957 (NASCAR Convertible)
- Distance: 400.238 miles (644.121 km)
- Laps: 293; Stage 1: 90; Stage 2: 95; Final stage: 108
- Previous names: Unknown (1952); Rebel 300 (1957–1965); Rebel 400 (1966–1972); Rebel 500 (1973, 1975–1978); Rebel 450 (1974); CRC Chemicals Rebel 500 (1979–1982); TranSouth 500 (1983–1993); TranSouth Financial 400 (1994–1999); Mall.com 400 (2000); Carolina Dodge Dealers 400 (2001−2004); The Real Heroes 400 (2020 I); Toyota 500 (2020 II)
- Most wins (driver): David Pearson (7)
- Most wins (team): Holman-Moody (7)
- Most wins (manufacturer): Ford (20)

Circuit information
- Surface: Asphalt
- Length: 1.366 mi (2.198 km)
- Turns: 4

The Goodyear 400 is a NASCAR Cup Series race held at Darlington Raceway in Darlington, South Carolina usually in the early portion the season. Tyler Reddick is the defending winner of the event.

== History ==
A 100-mile (160 km) race was held in May at the track in 1952, however the event did not become a regular one on the NASCAR schedule until 1957, as a 300 miles (480 km) race in the Convertible Division, then known as the Rebel 300. In 1966, the race was expanded to 400 miles (640 km), and in 1973 to 500 miles (800 km). In 1994, the race was relegated again to 400 miles. For a time, the race was held on or around Confederate Memorial Day, which is observed on May 10 in the state of South Carolina.

In 2005, as part of the settlement of the Ferko lawsuit and as part of a schedule realignment, Darlington was forced to give up one of its two races; the 400-mile race was dropped, with the fall Southern 500 taking its date before eventually moving back to its traditional Labor Day date in 2015.

In 2020, due to the COVID-19 pandemic, NASCAR announced it would be running two Darlington races in May (the fall Southern 500 date still stood), replacing the Chicagoland Speedway event and the Richmond Raceway spring race and also marking the return of spring Darlington racing. The track hosted a 400-mile race called The Real Heroes 400 on Sunday, May 17 (which was also the track's first scheduled day race since 2004) followed by a 500-kilometer race called the Toyota 500 on Wednesday, May 20.

On September 30, 2020, it was announced in a press conference at the South Carolina Governor's Mansion with Henry McMaster, Lesa Kennedy, and Darlington Raceway officials that after the success of the spring races in 2020, Darlington would receive a permanent second Cup date on the 2021 schedule and that it would be held on Mother's Day (May 9) in 2021 as part of a massive schedule realignment. The event would be a 400-miler just like The Real Heroes 400 in May 2020, and it would also become the throwback weekend for all three national series instead of the track's Labor Day weekend races. Goodyear, the official tire of NASCAR, would be the title sponsor for the spring Darlington race.

== Notable races ==
- 1960: Johnny Allen goes up the race track, tears open the guardrail, and then drives on the dirt banking on the outside of the track into a press grandstand. No one was seriously injured.
- 1970: Richard Petty hit the outside wall hard and then the inside wall even harder, causing his car to flip. The rag Petty would put in his mouth came out, and was mistaken by ABC as a gruesome death. Petty was seriously injured, but survived. During the roll, Petty's head hit the track surface several times, causing NASCAR to mandate the use of the Petty-developed window nets. These remain in use today.
- 1975: The finish shook into a bizarre sequence. In the final twenty laps Benny Parsons and David Pearson went after the lead; they raced side by side into Turn One and hammered the wall. Bobby Allison, who'd been a lap down, unlapped himself and raced into the lead with Darrell Waltrip and Donnie Allison hot on his heels. Bobby led them to the win, his second of the season and first at Darlington since 1972.
- 1977: A crash with five laps to go set up a wild finish. Darrell Waltrip shot past Bobby Allison, who was driving in relief of his brother Donnie, and Richard Petty charged into the fray; they hit the line three abreast and Waltrip was declared the winner as the final laps ran under caution.
- 1979: In a race that was seen on ABC's Wide World of Sports, Darrell Waltrip and Richard Petty hooked horns in a memorable duel. The lead changed four times between them on Lap 365 and three times on the final lap; Waltrip prevailed over Petty when he cleared Petty in Turn Three and Donnie Allison tried to shoot the gap, instead getting hung alongside Petty. During the race, David Pearson made a pit stop, and thought the Wood brothers were going to change only two tires. With the lug nuts loosened all the way around, Pearson sped out of the pits after two tires had been replaced. The loose inside wheels flew off near the pit road, ending Pearson's day. A week later, Pearson and the Wood Brothers split, despite scoring 43 wins from 1972 to 1978 with the Virginia-based team.
- 1980: David Pearson was now driving for Hoss Ellington Racing's #1 car, replacing Donnie Allison for the 1980 season. Despite the fact that the race was plagued by constant rain, and incoming darkness (the track did not have lights installed until the 2004 Southern 500, which finished after darkness), Pearson dominated the race and won after the race was called with 189 laps completed. This would be Pearson's 105th and final Cup Win, and his 10th at Darlington in his storied career.
- 1981: Darrell Waltrip beat Harry Gant by a car length for his third Rebel 500 win in the event's previous five runnings, while Gant finished second in his debut ride in a #33 Pontiac with car owners Hal Needham and Burt Reynolds.
- 1982: Dale Earnhardt, driving Bud Moore's #15 Ford, grabbed the first of nine Darlington wins when he led 181 laps but had to hold off a last-lap challenge from Cale Yarborough. Tim Richmond finished a lap down in fifth after a NASCAR penalty on pit road; Richmond was making his debut in Jim Stacy's #2.
- 1984: Darrell Waltrip led 251 laps as crashes thinned out the field. The crashing began when pole-sitter Benny Parsons hit the second-turn wall on the first lap; later there were back-to-back four-car crashes, and halfway through the race a multicar melee erupted involving Rusty Wallace, Dick Brooks, and D. K. Ulrich where Ulrich climbed another car; 28 of 38 entries were involved in crashes.
- 1987: Bill Elliott ran out of fuel on the final lap, and coasted out of turn 4, allowing Dale Earnhardt to sweep by and take the victory. Two vicious crashes erupted; in one Terry Labonte was injured after a hard hit by a spinning Ricky Rudd, while rookie Davey Allison hit a guardrail and his Ford's fuel cell erupted in flame.
- 1988: Lake Speed escaped a multicar wreck in the opening laps and breezed to one of the sport's most dramatic upset wins. It was his only Winston Cup win.
- 1990: Dale Earnhardt took the win, but the story of the race was a massive accident between Ernie Irvan and Ken Schrader; Irvan was ten laps down yet racing nose-to-nose with Schrader as if for the lead, and lost control in Four; several cars collided in the ensuring melee and Sterling Marlin spun off the wall and hammered Neil Bonnett; Bonnett suffered severe memory loss and did not race again until 1993.
- 1994: Dale Earnhardt became the 6th driver in NASCAR history to score 60 career NASCAR Cup Series wins. This was Dale's first win of the 1994 season, and this win would lead him to his record tying 7th Winston Cup Championship. This would be Dale Earnhardt's 9th and final Darlington win, and as of today, his 9 wins place him 2nd all-time behind only David Pearson's 10 wins.
- 2003: Before a national television audience, Ricky Craven and Kurt Busch fought a memorable duel that came down to the final turn, when Craven edged out Busch by 0.002 seconds (about 1-2 inches) in the joint closest finish in NASCAR history since NASCAR started using electronic transponders to determine scoring (along with the Aaron's 499 at Talladega in 2011). The record stood for 21 years, until Kyle Larson won the 2024 AdventHealth 400.
- 2020: The two races, held May 17 and 20, were the first Cup Series events since March 8 (at Phoenix) because of the COVID-19 pandemic that led to a 72-day suspension of motorsport. The race operated under heavy restrictions to follow social distancing guidelines, including being behind closed doors, a team limit of 16, and without practice or qualifying. Kevin Harvick won the race, his second Darlington win and 50th career Cup Series win.

== Past winners ==
Year	Date	No.	Driver	Team	Manufacturer	Race distance		Race time	Average speed (mph)	Report	Ref
Year	Date	No.	Driver	Team	Manufacturer	Laps	Miles (km)	Race time	Average speed (mph)	Report	Ref
1952	May 10	120	Dick Rathmann	Walt Chapman	Hudson	80	100 (160.934)	1:11:35	83.318	Report	
1953 – 1956	Not held										
1957	May 12*	22	Fireball Roberts	Pete DePaolo	Ford	219	301.125 (484.613)	2:47:23	107.941	Report	
1958	May 10	26	Curtis Turner	Holman-Moody	Ford	219	301.125 (484.613)	2:44:08	109.624	Report	
1959	May 9	22	Fireball Roberts	Frank Strickland	Chevrolet	219	301.125 (484.613)	2:36:00	115.817	Report	
1960	May 14	12	Joe Weatherly	Holman-Moody	Ford	219	301.125 (484.613)	2:56:01	102.64	Report	
1961	May 6	28	Fred Lorenzen	Holman-Moody	Ford	219	301.125 (484.613)	2:31:10	119.52	Report	
1962	May 12	29	Nelson Stacy	Holman-Moody	Ford	219	301.125 (484.613)	2:33:17	117.429	Report	
1963	May 11	8	Joe Weatherly	Bud Moore Engineering	Ford	2 x 110	2 X 151.25 (243.413)	1st / 2nd (Note: The 1963 Rebel 400 was determined by motocross-style calculations of best average finish)		Report	
1964	May 9	28	Fred Lorenzen	Holman-Moody	Ford	219	301.125 (484.613)	2:18:51	130.013	Report	
1965	May 8	26	Junior Johnson	Junior Johnson & Associates	Ford	219	301.125 (484.613)	2:41:32	111.849	Report	
1966	April 30	43	Richard Petty	Petty Enterprises	Plymouth	291	400.125 (643.938)	3:01:53	131.993	Report	
1967	May 13	43	Richard Petty	Petty Enterprises	Plymouth	291	400.125 (643.938)	3:10:56	125.738	Report	
1968	May 11	17	David Pearson	Holman-Moody	Ford	291	400.125 (643.938)	3:00:54	132.699	Report	
1969	May 10	98	LeeRoy Yarbrough	Junior Johnson & Associates	Mercury	291	400.125 (643.938)	3:02:28	131.572	Report	
1970	May 9	17	David Pearson	Holman-Moody	Ford	291	400.125 (643.938)	3:05:07	129.688	Report	
1971	May 2	11	Buddy Baker	Petty Enterprises	Dodge	293	400.238 (644.12)	3:03:46	130.678	Report	
1972	April 16	21	David Pearson	Wood Brothers Racing	Mercury	293	400.238 (644.12)	3:13:00	124.406	Report	
1973	April 15	21	David Pearson	Wood Brothers Racing	Mercury	367	501.322 (806.799)	4:04:14	122.655	Report	
1974	April 7	21	David Pearson	Wood Brothers Racing	Mercury	330	450.78 (725.460)	3:50:06	117.543	Report	
1975	April 13	16	Bobby Allison	Penske Racing	Matador	367	501.322 (806.799)	4:15:41	117.597	Report	
1976	April 11	21	David Pearson	Wood Brothers Racing	Mercury	367	501.322 (806.799)	4:04:36	122.973	Report	
1977	April 3	88	Darrell Waltrip	DiGard Motorsports	Chevrolet	367	501.322 (806.799)	3:53:18	128.817	Report	
1978	April 9	72	Benny Parsons	L.G. DeWitt	Chevrolet	367	501.322 (806.799)	3:55:50	127.544	Report	
1979	April 8	88	Darrell Waltrip	DiGard Motorsports	Chevrolet	367	501.322 (806.799)	4:06:59	121.721	Report	
1980	April 13	1	David Pearson	Ellington Racing	Chevrolet	189*	258.174 (415.49)	2:23:49	112.397	Report	
1981	April 12	11	Darrell Waltrip	Junior Johnson & Associates	Buick	367	501.322 (806.799)	3:57:24	126.703	Report	
1982	April 4	15	Dale Earnhardt	Bud Moore Engineering	Ford	367	501.322 (806.799)	4:03:27	123.554	Report	
1983	April 10	33	Harry Gant	Hal Needham	Buick	367	501.322 (806.799)	3:50:05	130.406	Report	
1984	April 15	11	Darrell Waltrip	Junior Johnson & Associates	Chevrolet	367	501.322 (806.799)	4:18:16	119.925	Report	
1985	April 14	9	Bill Elliott	Melling Racing	Ford	367	501.322 (806.799)	3:58:08	126.295	Report	
1986	April 13	3	Dale Earnhardt	Richard Childress Racing	Chevrolet	367	501.322 (806.799)	3:53:11	128.994	Report	
1987	March 29	3	Dale Earnhardt	Richard Childress Racing	Chevrolet	367	501.322 (806.799)	4:05:28	122.54	Report	
1988	March 27	83	Lake Speed	Lake Speed	Oldsmobile	367	501.322 (806.799)	3:49:07	131.284	Report	
1989	April 2	33	Harry Gant	Leo Jackson Racing	Oldsmobile	367	501.322 (806.799)	4:20:29	115.475	Report	
1990	April 1	3	Dale Earnhardt	Richard Childress Racing	Chevrolet	367	501.322 (806.799)	4:02:26	124.073	Report	
1991	April 7	5	Ricky Rudd	Hendrick Motorsports	Chevrolet	367	501.322 (806.799)	3:41:50	135.594	Report	
1992	March 29	11	Bill Elliott	Junior Johnson & Associates	Ford	367	501.322 (806.799)	3:35:50	139.364	Report	
1993	March 28	3	Dale Earnhardt	Richard Childress Racing	Chevrolet	367	501.322 (806.799)	3:33:29	139.958	Report	
1994	March 27	3	Dale Earnhardt	Richard Childress Racing	Chevrolet	293	400.238 (644.12)	3:01:20	132.432	Report	
1995	March 26	4	Sterling Marlin	Morgan-McClure Motorsports	Chevrolet	293	400.238 (644.12)	3:35:35	111.392	Report	
1996	March 24	24	Jeff Gordon	Hendrick Motorsports	Chevrolet	293	400.238 (644.12)	3:12:26	124.792	Report	
1997	March 23	88	Dale Jarrett	Robert Yates Racing	Ford	293	400.238 (644.12)	3:18:12	121.162	Report	
1998	March 22	88	Dale Jarrett	Robert Yates Racing	Ford	293	400.238 (644.12)	3:07:40	127.962	Report	
1999	March 21	99	Jeff Burton	Roush Racing	Ford	164*	224.024 (360.531)	1:50:49	121.294	Report	
2000	March 19	22	Ward Burton	Bill Davis Racing	Pontiac	293	400.238 (644.12)	3:07:30	128.076	Report	
2001	March 18	88	Dale Jarrett	Robert Yates Racing	Ford	293	400.238 (644.12)	3:09:45	126.557	Report	
2002	March 17	40	Sterling Marlin	Chip Ganassi Racing	Dodge	293	400.238 (644.12)	3:10:29	126.07	Report	
2003	March 16	32	Ricky Craven	PPI Motorsports	Pontiac	293	400.238 (644.12)	3:10:16	126.214	Report	
2004	March 21	48	Jimmie Johnson	Hendrick Motorsports	Chevrolet	293	400.238 (644.12)	3:30:39	114.001	Report	
2005 – 2019	Not held										
2020	May 17	4	Kevin Harvick	Stewart–Haas Racing	Ford	293	400.238 (644.12)	3:27:21	115.815	Report	
2020	May 20	11	Denny Hamlin	Joe Gibbs Racing	Toyota	208*	248.128 (399.23)	2:42:23	104.984	Report	
2021	May 9	19	Martin Truex Jr.	Joe Gibbs Racing	Toyota	293	400.238 (644.12)	3:14:21	123.562	Report	
2022	May 8	22	Joey Logano	Team Penske	Ford	293	400.238 (644.12)	3:21:32	119.158	Report	
2023	May 14	24	William Byron	Hendrick Motorsports	Chevrolet	295*	402.97 (648.516)	3:23:23	118.88	Report	
2024	May 12	6	Brad Keselowski	RFK Racing	Ford	293	400.238 (644.12)	3:12:30	124.75	Report	
2025	April 6	11	Denny Hamlin	Joe Gibbs Racing	Toyota	297*	405.702 (652.913)	3:21:14	120.965	Report	
2026	March 22	45	Tyler Reddick	23XI Racing	Toyota	293	400.238 (644.12)	3:04:56	129.854	Report	
2027	April 4									Report	

- 1957: Race postponed due to rain.
- 1957–1962: Race was for convertibles.
- 1963: Two 150-mile race format similar to motocross, best average score wins. Weatherly won the first race, Richard Petty won the second race. Weatherly (1/2) won the Rebel 300 with best overall finish.
- 2020: Two races held on same week due to COVID-19 pandemic. The May 20 event was scheduled for a 500km race.
- 1980, 1999, & 2020 II: Race shortened due to rain.
- 2023 and 2025: Race extended due to a NASCAR overtime finish.

=== Track length notes ===
- 1952: 1.25 mile course
- 1957–1970: 1.375 mile course
- 1971–present: 1.366 mile course

=== Multiple winners (drivers) ===
# Wins	Driver	Years won
7	David Pearson	1968, 1970, 1972–1974, 1976, 1980
6	Dale Earnhardt	1982, 1986–1987, 1990, 1993–1994
4	Darrell Waltrip	1977, 1979, 1981, 1984
3	Dale Jarrett	1997–1998, 2001
2	Fireball Roberts	1957, 1959
2	Joe Weatherly	1960, 1963
2	Fred Lorenzen	1961, 1964
2	Richard Petty	1966–1967
2	Harry Gant	1983, 1989
2	Bill Elliott	1985, 1992
2	Sterling Marlin	1995, 2002
2	Denny Hamlin	2020 II, 2025

=== Multiple winners (teams) ===
# Wins	Team	Years won
7	Holman-Moody	1958, 1960–1962, 1964, 1968, 1970
5	Junior Johnson & Associates	1965, 1969, 1981, 1984, 1992
5	Richard Childress Racing	1986–1987, 1990, 1993–1994
4	Wood Brothers Racing	1972–1974, 1976
4	Hendrick Motorsports	1991, 1996, 2004, 2023
3	Petty Enterprises	1966–1967, 1971
3	Robert Yates Racing	1997–1998, 2001
3	Joe Gibbs Racing	2020 II, 2021, 2025
2	Bud Moore Engineering	1963, 1982
2	DiGard Motorsports	1977, 1979
2	Team Penske	1975, 2022
2	RFK Racing	1999, 2024

=== Manufacturer wins ===
# Wins	Manufacturer	Years won
20	Ford	1957–1958, 1960–1965, 1968, 1970, 1982, 1985, 1992, 1997–1999, 2001, 2020 I, 2022, 2024
16	Chevrolet	1959, 1977–1980, 1984, 1986–1987, 1990–1991, 1993–1996, 2004, 2023
5	Mercury	1969, 1972–1974, 1976
4	Toyota	2020 II, 2021, 2025–2026
2	Plymouth	1966–1967
2	Buick	1981, 1983
2	Oldsmobile	1988–1989
2	Dodge	1971, 2002
2	Pontiac	2000, 2003
1	Hudson	1952
1	AMC	1975

== Notes ==
Previous race: Pennzoil 400	NASCAR Cup Series; Goodyear 400	Next race: Food City 500
