= 1988 TranSouth 500 =

Fifth race of the 1988 NASCAR Winston Cup Series

Race details
- Race 5 of 29 in the 1988 NASCAR Winston Cup Series
- The 1988 TranSouth 500 program cover, featuring Dale Earnhardt.
- Date: March 27, 1988
- Official name: 32nd Annual TranSouth 500
- Location: Darlington, South Carolina, Darlington Raceway
- Course: Permanent racing facility
- Course length: 2.198 km (1.366 miles)
- Distance: 367 laps, 501.322 mi (806.799 km)
- Scheduled distance: 367 laps, 501.322 mi (806.799 km)
- Average speed: 131.284 miles per hour (211.281 km/h)
- Attendance: 58,000

Pole position
Driver	Ken Schrader	Hendrick Motorsports
- Time: 30.233

Most laps led
Driver	Lake Speed	Speed Racing
- Laps: 178

Winner
No. 83	Lake Speed	Speed Racing

Television in the United States
- Network: ESPN
- Announcers: Bob Jenkins, Ned Jarrett, Gary Nelson

Radio in the United States
- Radio: Motor Racing Network

The 1988 TranSouth 500 was the fifth stock car race of the 1988 NASCAR Winston Cup Series season and the 32nd iteration of the event. The race was held on Sunday, March 27, 1988, before an audience of 58,000 in Darlington, South Carolina, at Darlington Raceway, a 1.366 miles (2.198 km) permanent egg-shaped oval racetrack. The race took the scheduled 367 laps to complete. In the late stages of the race, Lake Speed, driving for his owner-driver operation Speed Racing, would dominate the late stages of the race with Hoosier tires to score his first and only career NASCAR Winston Cup Series victory and his only victory of the season. To fill out the podium, AK Racing driver Alan Kulwicki and Ranier-Lundy Racing driver Davey Allison would finish second and third, respectively.

== Background ==
The layout of Darlington Raceway, the venue where the race was held.

Darlington Raceway is a race track built for NASCAR racing located near Darlington, South Carolina. It is nicknamed "The Lady in Black" and "The Track Too Tough to Tame" by many NASCAR fans and drivers and advertised as "A NASCAR Tradition." It is of a unique, somewhat egg-shaped design, an oval with the ends of very different configurations, a condition which supposedly arose from the proximity of one end of the track to a minnow pond the owner refused to relocate. This situation makes it very challenging for the crews to set up their cars' handling in a way that is effective at both ends.

=== Entry list ===
- (R) denotes rookie driver.

#	Driver	Team	Make	Sponsor
2	Ernie Irvan (R)	U.S. Racing	Chevrolet	Kroger, Pepsi
3	Dale Earnhardt	Richard Childress Racing	Chevrolet	GM Goodwrench Service
4	Rick Wilson	Morgan–McClure Motorsports	Oldsmobile	Kodak
5	Geoff Bodine	Hendrick Motorsports	Chevrolet	Levi Garrett
6	Mark Martin	Roush Racing	Ford	Stroh Light
7	Alan Kulwicki	AK Racing	Ford	Zerex
8	Bobby Hillin Jr.	Stavola Brothers Racing	Buick	Miller High Life
9	Bill Elliott	Melling Racing	Ford	Coors Light
10	Ken Bouchard (R)	Whitcomb Racing	Ford	Whitcomb Racing
11	Terry Labonte	Junior Johnson & Associates	Chevrolet	Budweiser
12	Bobby Allison	Stavola Brothers Racing	Buick	Miller High Life
15	Brett Bodine	Bud Moore Engineering	Ford	Crisco
17	Darrell Waltrip	Hendrick Motorsports	Chevrolet	Tide
21	Kyle Petty	Wood Brothers Racing	Ford	Citgo
22	Steve Moore	Hamby Motorsports	Chevrolet	Banks Oil
23	Eddie Bierschwale	B&B Racing	Oldsmobile	Wayne Paging
25	Ken Schrader	Hendrick Motorsports	Chevrolet	Folgers
26	Ricky Rudd	King Racing	Buick	Quaker State
27	Rusty Wallace	Blue Max Racing	Pontiac	Kodiak
28	Davey Allison	Ranier-Lundy Racing	Ford	Havoline
29	Dale Jarrett	Cale Yarborough Motorsports	Oldsmobile	Hardee's
30	Michael Waltrip	Bahari Racing	Pontiac	Country Time
31	Brad Teague	Bob Clark Motorsports	Oldsmobile	Slender You Figure Salons
33	Harry Gant	Mach 1 Racing	Chevrolet	Skoal
36	H. B. Bailey	Bailey Racing	Pontiac	Almeda Auto Parts
43	Richard Petty	Petty Enterprises	Pontiac	STP
44	Sterling Marlin	Hagan Racing	Oldsmobile	Piedmont Airlines
47	Morgan Shepherd	Shepherd Racing Ventures	Buick	Shepherd Racing Ventures
50	Greg Sacks	Dingman Brothers Racing	Pontiac	Dingman Brothers Racing
52	Jimmy Means	Jimmy Means Racing	Pontiac	Eureka
55	Phil Parsons	Jackson Brothers Motorsports	Oldsmobile	Crown, Skoal Classic
67	Buddy Arrington	Arrington Racing	Ford	Pannill Sweatshirts
68	Derrike Cope	Testa Racing	Ford	Purolator Filters
71	Dave Marcis	Marcis Auto Racing	Chevrolet	Lifebuoy
75	Neil Bonnett	RahMoc Enterprises	Pontiac	Valvoline
80	Jimmy Horton (R)	S&H Racing	Ford	S&H Racing
83	Lake Speed	Speed Racing	Oldsmobile	Wynn's, Kmart
88	Buddy Baker	Baker-Schiff Racing	Oldsmobile	Red Baron Frozen Pizza
90	Benny Parsons	Donlavey Racing	Ford	Bull's-Eye Barbecue Sauce
97	Rodney Combs	Winkle Motorsports	Buick	AC Spark Plug
98	Brad Noffsinger (R)	Curb Racing	Buick	Sunoco Ultra

== Qualifying ==
Qualifying was split into two rounds. Pole qualifying for the race was held on Thursday, March 24, 1988. Per the NASCAR rules in 1988, a one-lap qualifying attempt was utilized. The top twenty cars in pole qualifying were locked into the starting field. The remainder of the cars could stand on their time, or make a new attempt in second-round qualifying. If a driver did decide to make an attempt, their first-round times would be scrubbed. Second-round qualifying was held Friday, March 25, 1988. The drivers that had qualified 1st–20th on Thursday were locked-in to those positions and did not have to re-qualify.

Ken Schrader, driving for Hendrick Motorsports, would win the pole, setting a time of 30.233 and an average speed of 162.657 miles per hour (261.771 km/h).

No drivers would fail to qualify.

=== Full qualifying results ===
Pos.	#	Driver	Team	Make	Time	Speed
1	25	Ken Schrader	Hendrick Motorsports	Chevrolet	30.233	162.657
2	3	Dale Earnhardt	Richard Childress Racing	Chevrolet	30.587	160.774
3	7	Alan Kulwicki	AK Racing	Ford	30.710	160.130
4	5	Geoff Bodine	Hendrick Motorsports	Chevrolet	30.718	160.089
5	27	Rusty Wallace	Blue Max Racing	Pontiac	30.758	159.880
6	15	Brett Bodine	Bud Moore Engineering	Ford	30.814	159.590
7	4	Rick Wilson	Morgan–McClure Motorsports	Oldsmobile	30.818	159.569
8	83	Lake Speed	Speed Racing	Oldsmobile	30.946	158.909
9	28	Davey Allison	Ranier-Lundy Racing	Ford	30.954	158.868
10	26	Ricky Rudd	King Racing	Buick	31.000	158.632
11	11	Terry Labonte	Junior Johnson & Associates	Chevrolet	31.083	158.209
12	33	Harry Gant	Mach 1 Racing	Chevrolet	31.093	158.158
13	17	Darrell Waltrip	Hendrick Motorsports	Chevrolet	31.168	157.777
14	47	Morgan Shepherd	Shepherd Racing Ventures	Buick	31.184	157.696
15	9	Bill Elliott	Melling Racing	Ford	31.202	157.605
16	44	Sterling Marlin	Hagan Racing	Oldsmobile	31.205	157.590
17	21	Kyle Petty	Wood Brothers Racing	Ford	31.214	157.545
18	12	Bobby Allison	Stavola Brothers Racing	Buick	31.232	157.454
19	55	Phil Parsons	Jackson Brothers Motorsports	Oldsmobile	31.317	157.027
20	31	Brad Teague	Bob Clark Motorsports	Oldsmobile	31.330	156.961
Failed to lock in Round 1
21	6	Mark Martin	Roush Racing	Ford	30.945	158.914
22	10	Ken Bouchard (R)	Whitcomb Racing	Ford	31.209	157.570
23	88	Buddy Baker	Baker-Schiff Racing	Oldsmobile	31.333	156.946
24	71	Dave Marcis	Marcis Auto Racing	Chevrolet	31.342	156.901
25	23	Eddie Bierschwale	B&B Racing	Oldsmobile	31.363	156.796
26	75	Neil Bonnett	RahMoc Enterprises	Pontiac	31.407	156.577
27	30	Michael Waltrip	Bahari Racing	Pontiac	31.464	156.293
28	90	Benny Parsons	Donlavey Racing	Ford	31.470	156.263
29	8	Bobby Hillin Jr.	Stavola Brothers Racing	Buick	31.480	156.213
30	43	Richard Petty	Petty Enterprises	Pontiac	31.492	156.154
31	2	Ernie Irvan (R)	U.S. Racing	Chevrolet	31.500	156.114
32	29	Dale Jarrett	Cale Yarborough Motorsports	Oldsmobile	31.564	155.798
33	97	Rodney Combs	Winkle Motorsports	Buick	31.571	155.763
34	68	Derrike Cope	Testa Racing	Ford	31.605	155.596
35	80	Jimmy Horton (R)	S&H Racing	Ford	31.673	155.262
36	50	Greg Sacks	Dingman Brothers Racing	Pontiac	31.816	154.564
37	22	Steve Moore	Hamby Motorsports	Chevrolet	32.156	152.929
38	36	H. B. Bailey	Bailey Racing	Pontiac	32.217	152.640
39	52	Jimmy Means	Jimmy Means Racing	Pontiac	32.238	152.540
40	98	Brad Noffsinger (R)	Curb Racing	Buick	32.303	152.234
41	67	Buddy Arrington	Arrington Racing	Ford	32.587	150.907
Official qualifying results

== Race results ==
Fin	St	#	Driver	Team	Make	Laps	Led	Status	Pts	Winnings
1	8	83	Lake Speed	Speed Racing	Oldsmobile	367	178	running	185	$49,435
2	3	7	Alan Kulwicki	AK Racing	Ford	367	1	running	175	$30,905
3	9	28	Davey Allison	Ranier-Lundy Racing	Ford	367	42	running	170	$26,095
4	15	9	Bill Elliott	Melling Racing	Ford	366	1	running	165	$19,260
5	16	44	Sterling Marlin	Hagan Racing	Oldsmobile	366	5	running	160	$14,800
6	21	6	Mark Martin	Roush Racing	Ford	365	59	running	155	$7,025
7	4	5	Geoff Bodine	Hendrick Motorsports	Chevrolet	365	61	running	151	$10,490
8	19	55	Phil Parsons	Jackson Brothers Motorsports	Oldsmobile	365	0	running	142	$9,135
9	18	12	Bobby Allison	Stavola Brothers Racing	Buick	365	0	running	138	$11,505
10	23	88	Buddy Baker	Baker-Schiff Racing	Oldsmobile	365	3	running	139	$9,630
11	2	3	Dale Earnhardt	Richard Childress Racing	Chevrolet	363	0	running	130	$14,825
12	32	29	Dale Jarrett	Cale Yarborough Motorsports	Oldsmobile	362	0	running	127	$3,520
13	22	10	Ken Bouchard (R)	Whitcomb Racing	Ford	360	0	running	124	$4,640
14	25	23	Eddie Bierschwale	B&B Racing	Oldsmobile	360	0	running	121	$3,160
15	6	15	Brett Bodine	Bud Moore Engineering	Ford	353	0	running	118	$11,990
16	38	36	H. B. Bailey	Bailey Racing	Pontiac	352	0	running	115	$2,795
17	29	8	Bobby Hillin Jr.	Stavola Brothers Racing	Buick	351	0	running	112	$6,585
18	35	80	Jimmy Horton (R)	S&H Racing	Ford	344	0	running	109	$3,025
19	26	75	Neil Bonnett	RahMoc Enterprises	Pontiac	339	0	running	106	$9,465
20	20	31	Brad Teague	Bob Clark Motorsports	Oldsmobile	330	0	ignition	103	$2,905
21	27	30	Michael Waltrip	Bahari Racing	Pontiac	324	0	running	100	$6,070
22	31	2	Ernie Irvan (R)	U.S. Racing	Chevrolet	300	0	running	97	$3,785
23	11	11	Terry Labonte	Junior Johnson & Associates	Chevrolet	276	0	running	94	$9,100
24	13	17	Darrell Waltrip	Hendrick Motorsports	Chevrolet	268	1	running	96	$9,015
25	5	27	Rusty Wallace	Blue Max Racing	Pontiac	265	2	engine	93	$11,585
26	34	68	Derrike Cope	Testa Racing	Ford	263	0	engine	85	$5,180
27	7	4	Rick Wilson	Morgan–McClure Motorsports	Oldsmobile	230	0	distributor	82	$2,925
28	41	67	Buddy Arrington	Arrington Racing	Ford	227	0	crash	79	$4,780
29	1	25	Ken Schrader	Hendrick Motorsports	Chevrolet	225	14	running	81	$10,815
30	10	26	Ricky Rudd	King Racing	Buick	208	0	engine	73	$4,635
31	36	50	Greg Sacks	Dingman Brothers Racing	Pontiac	185	0	engine	70	$1,645
32	33	97	Rodney Combs	Winkle Motorsports	Buick	135	0	engine		$2,455
33	37	22	Steve Moore	Hamby Motorsports	Chevrolet	118	0	engine	64	$2,315
34	28	90	Benny Parsons	Donlavey Racing	Ford	108	0	engine	61	$4,230
35	39	52	Jimmy Means	Jimmy Means Racing	Pontiac	103	0	engine	58	$4,175
36	40	98	Brad Noffsinger (R)	Curb Racing	Buick	64	0	engine		$1,470
37	24	71	Dave Marcis	Marcis Auto Racing	Chevrolet	45	0	engine	52	$4,090
38	12	33	Harry Gant	Mach 1 Racing	Chevrolet	45	0	engine	49	$4,050
39	14	47	Morgan Shepherd	Shepherd Racing Ventures	Buick	19	0	crash	46	$1,410
40	17	21	Kyle Petty	Wood Brothers Racing	Ford	5	0	engine	43	$8,360
41	30	43	Richard Petty	Petty Enterprises	Pontiac	4	0	crash	40	$3,960
Official race results

== Standings after the race ==
Drivers' Championship standings

	Pos	Driver	Points
1	1	Dale Earnhardt	758
1	2	Neil Bonnett	738 (-20)
1	3	Sterling Marlin	735 (-23)
1	4	Rusty Wallace	686 (–72)
1	5	Bobby Allison	685 (–73)
6	6	Bill Elliott	680 (–78)
1	7	Buddy Baker	676 (–82)
3	8	Darrell Waltrip	657 (–101)
2	9	Terry Labonte	637 (–121)
	10	Bobby Hillin Jr.	628 (–130)
Official driver's standings

- Note: Only the first 10 positions are included for the driver standings.

Previous race: 1988 Motorcraft Quality Parts 500	NASCAR Winston Cup Series; 1988 season	Next race: 1988 Valleydale Meats 500
