= Ken Rush =

Racecar driver from North Carolina

- Rush, circa 1969
- Born: September 14, 1931; High Point, North Carolina, U.S.
- Died: October 17, 2011 (aged 80); High Point, North Carolina, U.S.
- Cause of death: Stroke
- Achievements: 1969 Grand American Champion; 1964 & 1966 Bowman Gray Stadium Modified Champion
- Awards: 1957 Grand National Series Rookie of the Year

NASCAR Cup Series career
- 56 races run over 8 years
- Best finish: 39th (1957)
- First race: 1957 Race #23 (Newport)
- Last race: 1972 World 600 (Charlotte)
Wins	Top tens	Poles
0	16	2
- Statistics up to date as of April 22, 2013.

Kenneth Rush (September 14, 1931 – October 17, 2011) was an American NASCAR Cup Series driver whose career spanned from 1957 to 1972.

== Career ==
Rush would win the 1969 'Bama 400 Grand Touring race on Saturday, September 13, 1969 - arguably the first race held at Talladega Superspeedway sanctioned by any motorsports body - in his Chevrolet Camaro. Another notable appearance for Rush was at the 1957 Rebel 300 where he finished in last place due to the infamous "lap 29" crash.

In his eight-year career, Rush managed to race in 56 races for a distance of 9396 laps - the equivalent of 5,717.6 miles (9,201.6 km). He started 14th on average and finished in 18th on average. After his racing career was over, Rush managed to earn $11,760 in total prize winnings ($90,515.51 when adjusted for inflation). Had he been born 40 years later, he may have accomplished the big prize winnings that today's NASCAR superstars earn from their races. A lot of the races during Rush's era paid $200 ($2,292.65 when adjusted for inflation) or less just for winning the race.

Rush died from a stroke in his hometown of High Point, North Carolina at age 80.
