= Grand American =

Former NASCAR sanctioned series

Grand American was a NASCAR sanctioned series of pony car stock cars. The series ran from 1968 until 1972. The series was called "Grand Touring" from 1968 to 1969.

== History ==
The series was formed in 1968 under the name "Grand Touring" as a competitor to USAC's Stock Car Division and SCCA's Trans-Am Series. It held 19 events in 1968 and 35 events in 1969. It was renamed Grand American for the 1970 season, hosting 27 events. By the 1971 season, NASCAR saw a decline in sponsorship, fan attendance and participation by teams, with Grand American hosting only seven events and NASCAR occasionally inviting Grand American cars to Grand National events that were short on entries (after the embarrassment of only 14 cars entering Grand National's 1971 Space City 300).

In 1972, the structure of NASCAR was completely changed. Winston took title sponsorship for the Grand National Series, which was renamed the Winston Cup Series. The extensive Grand National 48-race schedule of previous seasons was reduced to 31 by having all races at tracks under a 1/2 mile in length or 250 miles in event length moved to a new division called the Grand National East Division. Grand American and retired (as old as 1969) Grand National/Winston Cup cars were allowed to race in the new division. That series lasted from 1972 until 1973. The Grand American series held four events in 1972, its final season.

== Cars ==
The series featured Ford Mustangs, Chevrolet Camaros, AMC Javelins, Mercury Cougars and Pontiac Trans Ams. Several Grand American cars were former SCCA Trans-Am cars, extensively modified to meet the NASCAR safety rules and weight limits. Some drivers also used foreign cars such as Porsche 911 in the series' early years.

The motors were initially restricted to a 305 cubic inch (5.0 liter) engine displacement. The 305 cubic inch limit eventually was increased to 366 cubic inch to help with performance and reliability of the Grand American cars.

== Win controversies ==
In 1971, the money invested in NASCAR teams by American auto makers began to lessen as marketing and perceived consumer demand caused funds to shift away from NASCAR. The car entries for some of the top division Grand National events with smaller payouts shrank (only 14 cars entered the 1971 Space City 300) to the point that NASCAR allowed the Grand American cars to compete in certain Grand National races. Three of these Grand National races were won by drivers in Grand American cars; Tiny Lund (driving a Camaro in the Buddy Shuman 276 and the Wilkes 400) and Bobby Allison (driving a Mustang in the Myers Brothers 250) used pony cars at flat tracks that favored the smaller cars.

These victories were not added to either driver's NASCAR Grand National total wins and there was a debate whether or not they should be added. NASCAR had dictated that points would be awarded separately for each series. Despite this, the wins were counted in the constructor's standings and as a start for Lund. In October 2024, in the promotion of the 2025 Cook Out Clash at Bowman Gray Stadium, NASCAR announced Allison's win would be credited, giving him sole position of fourth place in the Cup series at 85.

== Drivers ==
The series was dominated by Tiny Lund. Lund won 41 races in the 109 races in the series' history. Lund won three of the four full-season championships, with the other one won by Ken Rush of High Point, N.C. Pete Hamilton won 12 of 26 events in 1969.

=== List of champions ===
- 1968 Tiny Lund
- 1969 Ken Rush
- 1970 Tiny Lund
- 1971 Tiny Lund
- 1972 Wayne Andrews

Other notable drivers who were regular competitors in the Grand American Series include: Jim Paschal, Buck Baker and Richard Childress. Dan Gurney, Parnelli Jones, Mark Donohue and Jim Hall are sometimes credited as "NASCAR Grand American" drivers. The reality is that these road race stars competed in the SCCA Trans-Am series, which had at least one annual event co-sanctioned with NASCAR, the Florida Citrus 250 at Daytona.

1968 championship results:

1. Tiny Lund: 1,947 points - 9 wins (Mercury Cougar)
2. Buck Baker: 1,017 points - 3 wins (Chevrolet Camaro)
3. Jack Ryan: 1,012 points - 0 wins (Porsche 911)
4. Jim Vandiver: 938 points - 0 wins
5. Roy Tyner: 881 points - 0 wins
6. Al Straub: 875 points - 0 wins
7. Billy Yuma: 710 points - 0 wins
8. Ernie Shaw: 682 points - 0 wins
9. Donnie Allison: 664 points - 5 wins
10. Little Bud Moore: 653 points - 0 wins

== Grand American Stock Car division ==
The Grand American name was brought back from 1978 through 1985 when the NASCAR Grand American Stock Car division was defined. Races were open to 1968 to 1978 steel‐bodied models of American‐made passenger car production sedans and American‐made compact sedans with an original wheelbase of no less than 107 inches. Maximum engine displacement was limited to 433 cubic inches.
