= Cliff Stewart =

Australian rules footballer

Personal information
- Full name: Cliff Stewart
- Born: 4 April 1942 (age 84)
- Original team: Thorpdale
- Height: 178 cm (5 ft 10 in)
- Weight: 72 kg (159 lb)
- Position: Wing

Playing career^{1}
Years	Club	Games (Goals)
1962–68	Carlton	78 (6)
- ^{1} Playing statistics correct to the end of 1968.

Cliff Stewart (born 4 April 1942) is a former Australian rules footballer who played with Carlton in the Victorian Football League (VFL).
