= 1957 Rebel 300 =

Auto race held at Darlington Raceway in 1957

Race details
- Race 14 of 36 in the 1957 NASCAR Convertible Division|1957 NASCAR Convertible Series season
- 1957 Rebel 300 program cover
- Date: May 12, 1957
- Official name: Rebel 300
- Location: Darlington Raceway (Darlington, South Carolina)
- Course: Permanent racing facility
- Course length: 1.366 miles (2.198 km)
- Distance: 219 laps, 301.3 mi (606.7 km)
- Weather: Temperatures of 81 °F (27 °C); wind speeds of 7 miles per hour (11 km/h)
- Average speed: 107.921 miles per hour (173.682 km/h)
- Attendance: 17,000

Pole position
Driver	Paul Goldsmith	Slim Rominger

Most laps led
Driver	Fireball Roberts	Pete DePaolo
- Laps: 181

Winner
No. 22	Fireball Roberts	Pete DePaolo

The 1957 Rebel 300 was a NASCAR Convertible Series race in Darlington, South Carolina on May 12, 1957. While the Rebel 300 was originally a convertible race, it eventually became absorbed into what is now known as the NASCAR Cup Series. From a lineal historical standpoint, this race is the first in the lineal history of the current Darlington Cup race since 2005, the Southern 500.

The race's name references the Confederate Memorial Day weekend of the race, which was held on the Saturday closest to Confederate Memorial Day from 1957 until 1965, and again from 1967 until 1969, and again from 2005 until 2013. After a Saturday rainout, track president Bob Colvin decided to race on the next clear day, in violation of South Carolina blue laws (the Southern 500 was held on Monday until 1984). Colvin was fined $58 for the violation by Sheriff Grover Bryant ($665 when adjusted for inflation). Tickets for this event sold from anywhere from $5 USD ($57 when adjusted for inflation) to $8 USD ($92 when adjusted for inflation). The 1957 Rebel 300 was also the first NASCAR convertible race to be run on a Sunday and on Mother's Day.

== Race report ==
Among the cars that failed to qualify for this race included Cup Series race winners Darel Dieringer, Neil Castles, Tiny Lund and Ralph Moody. While Curtis Turner and Marvin Panch dominated the early portion of the race, a series of crashes would knock most of the 27-car grid out of the race. Most of the field would be driving vehicles from either Ford or Plymouth. The 29th lap was marred by a nine-car wreck. All the drivers were born in the United States of America. Ken Rush was the last-place finisher. In the end, the race was between Joe Weatherly, Fireball Roberts and Bobby Myers.

Fireball Roberts would ultimately beat Tim Flock by two laps in front of 17,000 people. The time of the race was 2:47 with no caution laps. Lap 95 was the only time that Roberts didn't lead the race because of a pit stop. Art Binkley, Dick Beaty and Possum Jones would be the most notable drivers in the lap 29 crashes. Beaty was later known as a NASCAR official and Bobby Myers' son Danny became a well-known mechanic in NASCAR, as a member of Richard Childress Racing's "Flying Aces" pit crew.

There was a red flag on lap 30 for 50 minutes for cleanup the track. Jim Paschal #75 blew a tire and started the big nine-car accident. Buck Baker relieved Bob Welborn on the 85th lap, Curtis Turner relieved Roger Baldwin on the 30th lap, Tiny Lund relieved Whitey Norman on the 30th lap, Jim Paschal relieved Ken Rush on the 1st lap, and Fonty Flock relieved Glen Wood on the 1st lap.

The concept of racing convertibles in NASCAR would last throughout the rest of the 1950s and into the year 1962 where the final Rebel 300 was raced before the regular Grand National cars took over in 1963. Cost-cutting measures ultimately became the reason behind the demise of the NASCAR Convertible Division.

The Rebel 300 format was changed to a twin 150-mile race for the Grand National cars in 1963, with a switch to a single race of 400 miles in 1964, 500 miles in 1974, and 400 miles in 1994. From 2005 until 2013, the Rebel 500 ran on the traditional Mother's Day / Confederate Memorial Day weekend date of the first Rebel, with the 2007 race—50 years since the first Rebel 300 being rained out and racing on the Sunday itself. In 2014, the Rebel was held in April, and moved back to September in 2015.

=== Finishing order ===
Fin	St	#	Driver	Sponsor	Make	Laps	Led	Status	Pts
1	4	22	Fireball Roberts		'57 Ford	219	181	running	
2	7	15	Tim Flock		'57 Mercury	217	0	running	
3	12	4	Bobby Myers		'56 Mercury	216	7	running	
4	13	49	Bob Welborn		'57 Chevrolet	216	0	running	
5	9	42	Lee Petty		'57 Oldsmobile	213	0	running	
6	18	46	Jack Smith		'57 Chevrolet	212	0	running	
7	24	10	Roger Baldwin		'56 Ford	210	0	running	
8	20	1A	Whitey Norman		'56 Ford	207	0	running	
9	10	88	Johnny Dodson		'57 Oldsmobile	206	0	running	
10	23	76	Larry Frank		'56 Chevrolet	204	0	running	
11	25	44	Al Tasnady		'57 Plymouth	199	0	running	
12	15	34	Gwyn Staley		'57 Plymouth	196	0	running	
13	19	86	Don Oldenberg		'57 Plymouth	192	0	running	
14	22	33	Jimmy Massey		'57 Plymouth	191	0	running	
15	27	20	Jimmy Thompson		'56 Ford	179	0	crash	
16	26	41	Art Binkley		'56 Plymouth	164	0	running	
17	14	21	Glen Wood		'57 Ford	121	0	engine	
18	1	3	Paul Goldsmith		'57 Ford	71	0	crash	
19	5	14	Billy Myers		'57 Mercury	35	0	crash	
20	2	12	Joe Weatherly		'57 Ford	35	2	crash	
21	3	26	Curtis Turner		'57 Ford	29	11	crash	
22	6	98	Marvin Panch		'57 Ford	29	18	crash	
23	8	97	Bill Amick		'57 Ford	29	0	crash	
24	21	87	Buck Baker		'57 Chevrolet	29	0	crash	
25	16	48	Possum Jones		'57 Chevrolet	29	0	crash	
26	11	39	Dick Beaty		'56 Ford	29	0	crash	
27	17	75	Ken Rush		'56 Mercury	26	0	crash	
Failed to qualify
28		35	Darel Dieringer		Ford				
29		2	Ewell Weddle		Chevrolet				
30		9	Dave Terrell		Chevrolet				
31		18	Eddie Hughes		Ford				
32		50	Charlie Cregar		Plymouth				
33		55	Neil Castles		Ford				
34		71	Bill Poor		Chevrolet				
35		77	Bud Crothers		Chevrolet				
36		78	Shep Langdon		Chevrolet				
37		19	James Jones		Ford				
38		32	Raymond Carter		Chevrolet				
39		40	George Baumgardner		Ford				
40		47	Jimmie Lewallen		Chevrolet				
41		99	Bill Lutz		Pontiac				
42		55	Tiny Lund		Pontiac				
43		24	Ralph Moody		Ford				
44		7	Jim Reed		Ford				
45		5	Tom Pistone		Plymouth				

== Timeline ==
Marvin Panch
Curtis Turner
Marvin Panch
Joe Weatherly
Fireball Roberts
Bobby Myers
Fireball Roberts
│
1
│
11
│
21
│
31
│
41
│
51
│
61
│
71
│
81
│
91
│
101
│
111
│
121
│
131
│
141
│
151
│
161
│
171
│
181
│
191
│
201
│
211
