= Possum Jones =

American racing driver

- Born: Lewis V. Jones, Jr. January 16, 1934; Mango, Florida, U.S.
- Died: December 27, 1997 (aged 63); Okeechobee, Florida, U.S.

NASCAR Cup Series career
- 47 races run over 10 years
- Best finish: 13th - 1960 Grand National season
- First race: 1952 Southern 500 (Darlington Raceway)
- Last race: 1965 Daytona 500 (Qualifier #2 at Daytona International Speedway)
Wins	Top tens	Poles
0	13	1

Possum Jones (January 16, 1934 – December 27, 1997) was an American NASCAR Grand National driver.

== Career ==
From 1952 to 1965, Jones managed to lead 28 out of the 8234 laps that he committed in his career. The 29th lap of the 1957 Rebel 300 would become infamous for the nine-car wreck that become a harbinger of doom in the days prior to the "modern" NASCAR Cup Series. Jones would be involved in this wreck; sharing a photo opportunity with Art Binkey and Dick Beaty in their wrecked vehicles.

Jones practically cut his professional racing career "teeth" on racing convertibles in NASCAR. He was one of the original drivers who partook in the 1956 Convertible season. In 1957, Jones won two convertible races, at Syracuse and Fayetteville. This experiment in "stock car racing" would last throughout the rest of the 1950s and into the year 1962 before the regular stock cars became more cost efficient. It became too expensive to cut the tops off the vehicles; causing the demise of the NASCAR Convertible Division.

This would add up to 6,950.5 miles (11,185.7 km) raced in total. Total earnings for Possum Jones was $13,680 ($139,761.35 when adjusted for inflation). On average, Jones started in 21st place and finished in 20th place. Possum Jones was also a NASCAR owner during the 1963 and 1964 seasons. He managed to arrange rides for himself in addition to Jim McGuirk, Joe Weatherly, and Joe Penland.
