= 1981 Daytona 500 =

Auto race held at Daytona International Speedway in 1981

Race details
- Race 2 of 31 in the 1981 NASCAR Winston Cup Series season
- 1981 Daytona 500 program cover
- Date: February 15, 1981
- Location: Daytona International Speedway, Daytona Beach, Florida
- Course: Permanent racing facility 2.5 mi (4.02336 km)
- Distance: 200 laps, 500 mi (804.672 km)
- Weather: Temperatures of 69.1 °F (20.6 °C); wind speeds of 15.9 miles per hour (25.6 km/h)
- Average speed: 169.651 miles per hour (273.027 km/h)
- Attendance: 130,000

Pole position
Driver	Bobby Allison	Harry Ranier

Most laps led
Driver	Bobby Allison	Harry Ranier
- Laps: 117

Winner
No. 43	Richard Petty	Petty Enterprises

Television in the United States
- Network: CBS
- Announcers: Ken Squier; David Hobbs; Ned Jarrett; Brock Yates

The 1981 Daytona 500, the 23rd running of the event, was a NASCAR Winston Cup Series race held at the Daytona International Speedway in Daytona Beach, Florida, United States. It was held on Sunday, February 15, 1981.

== Race report ==
Contested over 200 laps and over the course of 2 hours and 56 minutes, the race was won by Richard Petty for his record seventh at the Daytona 500, beating Bobby Allison to the line by 3.5 seconds and bringing about Buick's first win in NASCAR since 1956. Ricky Rudd, Buddy Baker, and Dale Earnhardt rounded out the Top 5. A new generation of smaller cars, with a wheelbase of 110 inches (280 cm), down from the previously used 115 inches (290 cm), made their debut in this race.

David Pearson had the only Chevrolet in the field. He started 9th in his new Monte Carlo after finishing 5th in the Twin 125 before retiring with engine failure. Steve Moore attempted to qualify in a Chevrolet Malibu but his #73 didn't make the race.

Bobby Allison dominated Speedweeks from the beginning, winning the pole position, his 125-mile qualifying race, and was considered the prohibitive favorite for the 500. He was driving a 1981 Pontiac Le Mans, which was the only car in the race with a "fastback" sloped rear window, greatly improving aerodynamics and downforce on the rear spoiler over the "notchback" profiles of the Buick Regals, Pontiac Grand Prixs, Oldsmobile Cutlasses, and Ford Thunderbirds. The Le Mans was on the NASCAR approved-model list, but no other team thought to build one.

Allison led the most laps and was the car to beat. But Allison lost considerable time when he ran out of fuel and had to coast through most of a lap to make his final pit stop. Meanwhile, on Richard Petty's final planned pit stop, Petty's crew chief Dale Inman, who was working his final race with the team before leaving to become Dale Earnhardt's crew chief, opted not to change tires and only took on fuel. Petty then re-entered the track with a considerable lead that Allison rapidly closed, but could not overcome before the finish.

The race was contested in front of 130,000 spectators and featured 49 lead changes. 18 laps were run under the caution flag. It was one of the few Daytona 500s where the final caution flag occurred before the halfway point of the race.

Petty earned $90,575 ($320,759 when adjusted for inflation) for winning, the largest purse of his entire career. Blackie Wangerin finished last after an accident on lap 17.

First Daytona 500 starts for Ronnie Sanders, Tim Richmond, Kyle Petty, and Billie Harvey. Only Daytona 500 starts for Glenn Jarrett and Don Sprouse. Last Daytona 500 starts for Johnny Rutherford, Bill Elswick, Don Whittington, James Hylton, Cecil Gordon, Bruce Hill, and Blackie Wangerin.

Dickie Boswell would make his only Cup Series attempt at this race.

== Race results ==
Pos	Grid	No.	Driver	Team	Manufacturer	Laps	Time/Retired	Led	Points
1	8	43	Richard Petty	Petty Enterprises	Buick	200	2:56:50	27	180
2	1	28	Bobby Allison	Ranier-Lundy Racing	Pontiac	200	+3.5 seconds	117	180
3	5	88	Ricky Rudd	DiGard Racing	Oldsmobile	200	Lead lap, under green flag	8	170
4	6	1	Buddy Baker	Ellington Racing	Oldsmobile	200	Lead lap, under green flag	10	165
5	7	2	Dale Earnhardt	Rod Osterlund Racing	Pontiac	200	Lead lap, under green flag	4	160
6	16	9	Bill Elliott	Elliott Racing	Ford	199	+1 Lap	4	155
7	27	90	Jody Ridley	Donlavey Racing	Ford	198	+2 Laps	0	146
8	29	27	Cale Yarborough	M. C. Anderson Racing	Oldsmobile	197	+3 Laps	0	142
9	34	75	Joe Millikan	RahMoc Enterprises	Buick	197	+3 Laps	0	138
10	35	98	Johnny Rutherford	Benfield Racing	Pontiac	195	+5 Laps	0	134
11	21	57	Bill Elswick	RahMoc Enterprises	Oldsmobile	195	+5 Laps	0	130
12	33	12	Donnie Allison	Kennie Childers Racing	Oldsmobile	195	+5 Laps	0	127
13	22	22	Stan Barrett	Mach 1 Racing	Pontiac	195	+5 Laps	0	124
14	13	93	Don Whittington	Smith Racing	Oldsmobile	194	+6 Laps	0	121
15	15	71	Dave Marcis	Marcis Auto Racing	Oldsmobile	194	+6 Laps	0	118
16	38	41	Dick Brooks	Billy Matthews Racing	Buick	193	+7 Laps	1	120
17	28	64	Tommy Gale	Langley Racing	Ford	192	+8 Laps	0	112
18	17	19	Ronnie Sanders	Gray Racing	Buick	191	+9 Laps	0	109
19	23	17	Glenn Jarrett	Hamby Motorsports	Buick	186	+14 Laps	0	106
20	39	37	Don Sprouse	Rogers Racing	Oldsmobile	181	+19 Laps	0	103
21	26	52	Jimmy Means	Jimmy Means Racing	Pontiac	179	+21 Laps	0	100
22	14	23	Geoff Bodine	Bahre Racing	Pontiac	178	+22 Laps	0	97
23	31	47	Harry Gant	Race Hill Farm Team	Buick	175	+25 Laps	0	94
24	41	70	J. D. McDuffie	McDuffie Racing	Pontiac	169	+31 Laps	0	91
25	37	86	Elliott Forbes-Robinson	Howard & Egerton Racing	Buick	167	Axle	0	88
26	20	67	Buddy Arrington	Arrington Racing	Dodge	159	+41 Laps	0	85
27	32	68	Lennie Pond	Testa Racing	Buick	155	Oil pump	0	82
28	19	25	Ronnie Thomas	Ronnie Thomas	Pontiac	151	Clutch	0	79
29	9	16	David Pearson	Halpern Enterprises	Chevrolet	144	Engine	3	81
30	40	99	Tim Richmond	Ulrich Racing	Buick	144	Transmission	0	73
31	4	15	Benny Parsons	Bud Moore Engineering	Ford	135	Overheating	0	70
32	11	42	Kyle Petty	Petty Enterprises	Buick	128	Engine	0	67
33	3	21	Neil Bonnett	Wood Brothers Racing	Ford	123	Clutch	26	69
34	25	48	James Hylton	Hylton Motorsports	Pontiac	123	Piston	0	61
35	10	51	A. J. Foyt	A. J. Foyt Enterprises	Oldsmobile	120	Valve	0	58
36	2	11	Darrell Waltrip	Junior Johnson & Associates	Buick	117	Engine	0	55
37	42	24	Cecil Gordon	Gordon Racing	Buick	116	+84 Laps	0	52
38	18	3	Richard Childress	Richard Childress Racing	Pontiac	110	Valve	0	49
39	24	7	Bruce Hill	Nelson Malloch	Buick	54	Crash	0	46
40	12	44	Terry Labonte	Hagan Racing	Buick	47	Engine	0	43
41	36	31	Billie Harvey	Billie Harvey	Pontiac	45	Engine	0	40
42	30	39	Blackie Wangerin	Wangerin Racing	Ford	17	Crash	0	37

== Post-race standings ==
Pos	Driver	Points	Differential
1	Bobby Allison	365	0
2	Richard Petty	340	-25
3	Dale Earnhardt	325	-40
4	Jody Ridley	292	-73
5	Ricky Rudd	281	-84
6	Joe Millikan	267	-98
7	Don Whittington	242	-123
8	Elliott Forbes-Robinson	230	-135
9	Buddy Arrington	223	-142
10	Terry Labonte	218	-147

Preceded by 1981 Winston Western 500	NASCAR Winston Cup Series Season; 1981	Succeeded by 1981 Richmond 400
