= Bill Elliott =

American racing driver and team owner (born 1955)

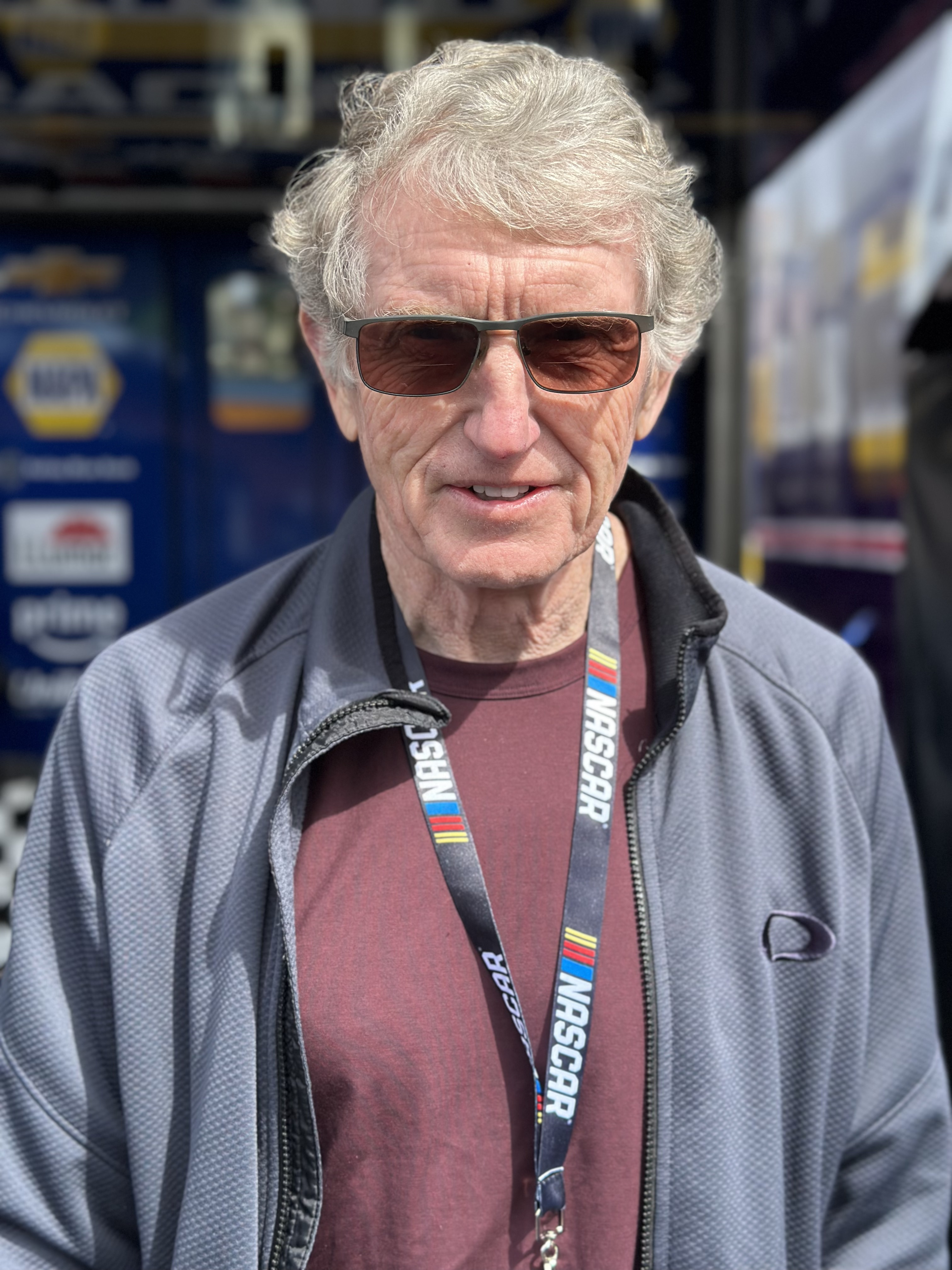
- Elliott in 2025
- Born: William Clyde Elliott Sr. October 8, 1955 (age 71); Dawsonville, Georgia, U.S.
- Height: 6 ft 1 in (185 cm)
- Achievements: 1988 Winston Cup Series Champion; 2× Daytona 500 Winner (1985, 1987); 3× Southern 500 Winner (1985, 1988, 1994); 1985 Winston 500 Winner; 2002 Brickyard 400 Winner 1986 The Winston Winner; 1987 Busch Clash Winner; 4× Gatorade Twin 125 Winner (1985, 1986, 1992, 2000); 4× Daytona 500 Pole Winner (1985, 1986, 1987, 2001) Won record 11 superspeedway races in 1985 Led NASCAR Winston Cup Series in wins in 1985, 1988 (tie), and 1992 (tie) 7 wins at Michigan International Speedway (including 4 wins in a row 1985-1986) 6 Consecutive Poles at Talladega Superspeedway (1985-1987) Recorded the fastest qualifying speed in NASCAR history at 212.809 MPH for the 1987 Winston 500 at Talladega Superspeedway
- Awards: 1984–1988, 1991–2000, 2002 Winston Cup Series Most Popular Driver (16 times); National Motorsports Press Association Driver of the Year (1985); Named one of NASCAR's 50 Greatest Drivers (1998); Georgia Sports Hall of Fame (1998); Inaugural Inductee into Georgia Racing Hall of Fame (2002); Motorsports Hall of Fame of America (2007); National Motorsports Press Association Hall of Fame (2015); NASCAR Hall of Fame (2015); Named one of NASCAR's 75 Greatest Drivers (2023)

NASCAR Cup Series career
- 828 races run over 37 years
- 2012 position: 49th
- Best finish: 1st (1988)
- First race: 1976 Carolina 500 (Rockingham)
- Last race: 2012 Coke Zero 400 (Daytona)
- First win: 1983 Winston Western 500 (Riverside)
- Last win: 2003 Pop Secret Microwave Popcorn 400 (Rockingham)
Wins	Top tens	Poles
44	320	55

NASCAR O'Reilly Auto Parts Series career
- 44 races run over 13 years
- 2018 position: 64th
- Best finish: 29th (1993)
- First race: 1983 Mello Yello 300 (Charlotte)
- Last race: 2018 Johnsonville 180 (Road America)
- First win: 1993 Fay's 150 (Watkins Glen)
Wins	Top tens	Poles
1	16	2

NASCAR FedEx Freight Truck Series career
- 2 races run over 2 years
- Best finish: 80th (1996)
- First race: 1996 Carquest 420K (Las Vegas)
- Last race: 1997 Carquest 420K (Las Vegas)
Wins	Top tens	Poles
0	1	0
- Statistics up to date as of September 18, 2024.

William Clyde Elliott Sr. (born October 8, 1955), also known as "Awesome Bill from Dawsonville", "Million Dollar Bill", or "Wild Bill" is an American former professional stock car racing driver. He last competed in the Superstar Racing Experience part-time in 2022. His accolades include the 1988 Winston Cup Championship and garnering 44 wins in that series, including crown jewel victories in two Daytona 500s (1985, 1987), three Southern 500s (1985, 1988, and 1994), one Winston 500 (1985), and one Brickyard 400 (2002). In 1985, Elliott became the first driver to win the Winston Million bonus, earning him the nickname "Million Dollar Bill". Elliott achieved a NASCAR record four consecutive wins at Michigan International Speedway between 1985 and 1986, and seven wins overall, the most at any one racetrack in his career. Elliott also won an additional six exhibition (non-points) races in his career, including one Winston All-Star Race win in 1986, one Busch Clash win in 1987, and four Daytona Duel wins in 1985, 1986, 1992, and 2000.

Elliott holds the track record for fastest qualifying speed at Talladega at 212.809 miles per hour (342.483 km/h) and Daytona International Speedway at 210.364 miles per hour (338.548 km/h), both of which were set in 1987; the mark at Talladega is the fastest qualifying speed for any NASCAR race ever. With the usage of restrictor plates at Daytona and Talladega since 1988, it is highly unlikely that these two qualifying speed records will ever be topped.

Elliott won NASCAR's Most Popular Driver Award a record 16 times (1984–1988, 1991–2000, 2002). He withdrew his name from the ballot for that award after winning it in 2002. Regarded as one of the greatest drivers in NASCAR history, Elliott was named one of NASCAR's 50 Greatest Drivers in 1998 and inducted into the NASCAR Hall of Fame as part of the Class of 2015.

Elliott's son Chase Elliott is the 2020 NASCAR Cup Series champion. The Elliotts became the third father-son NASCAR champions in history, along with Lee and Richard Petty, and Ned and Dale Jarrett.

== Personal life ==
William Clyde Elliott was born in Dawsonville, Georgia on October 8, 1955. According to his autobiography, many generations of Elliotts resided there. He was named after two relatives and is the youngest of three boys. His parents were Erving "George" Elliott Jr. (1924-1998) and Mildred Reece (1921-1991) His father George created a lumber company and loved racing, and later created a speed shop where Bill's brothers, Ernie (born 1947) and Dan (born 1951), worked. His father was also a Ford person and later created a Ford dealership as there were none in the area.

Elliott has two daughters, Starr and Brittany, with the wife from his 1st marriage, Martha. Bill and his current wife Cindy, have one son together, William Clyde II (nicknamed "Chase"). The 2014 NASCAR Nationwide Series champion and the 2020 NASCAR Cup Series champion, Chase Elliott currently competes in the NASCAR Cup Series for Hendrick Motorsports in the No. 9 Chevrolet. Brittany Elliott joined the US Air Force Security Forces.

== NASCAR career ==
=== Elliott/Melling years (1976–1991) ===
==== Elliott Racing (1976–1981) ====
Driving a car owned by his father, George Elliott, Elliott made his first Winston Cup Series start at Rockingham in 1976. He qualified 34th in a field of 36 cars, and finished 33rd; Elliott only lasted 32 laps that day before the oil pump failed in his Ford Torino. Elliott toiled for five years in the Winston Cup Series without corporate sponsorship, and along the way showed flashes that he could compete with the established veterans of the sport. In mid-1977, Elliott bought a Mercury Montego from Bobby Allison after his split from Penske Racing to replace the inferior Torino, and the move paid off. He soon earned his first top-ten finish in the Southern 500 (tenth), and his first top-five finish two years later in the same race, finishing second to race winner (and Elliott's boyhood hero) David Pearson.

In the fall of 1980, Elliott gained his first major sponsor in the form of $500 from Harry Melling of Melling Racing in the 1980 National 500 at Charlotte. Melling would extend his contract and give the team enough sponsorship to run a twelve race schedule in 1981. In the 1981 season, he had one top-five and seven top-ten finishes in thirteen races, including the team's first pole in the spring race at Darlington.

==== Early years with Melling Racing (1982–1984) ====
On December 1, 1981, Melling bought the team from Elliott's father George. In 1982, Elliott continued to show more and more flashes, and continued to flirt with victory lane more and more, as he finished the season with eight top-five finishes, and nine top-ten finishes which included three runner-up finishes in the World 600 at Charlotte to Neil Bonnett, the Firecracker 400 at Daytona to Bobby Allison, and the fall race at Charlotte to Harry Gant.

In 1983, Elliott picked up four more second place finishes in the season, which included finishing runner-up in the Daytona 500 to Cale Yarborough, runner-up at Rockingham to Richard Petty, runner-up in the summer race at the road course Riverside to Ricky Rudd, and runner-up in the Southern 500 at Darlington to Bobby Allison. After 115 starts beginning in 1976, and eight second place finishes between 1979 and 1983, Elliott finally broke through and won his first Winston Cup race in the final race of the 1983 season — the Winston Western 500 at Riverside. With his first win to go along with 12 top-fives and 22 top-tens, Elliott finished the 1983 season third in the final championship point standings.

Elliott gained full sponsorship from Coors in 1984 to the tune of $400,000 and won three races – the Michigan 400 at Michigan, the Miller High Life 500 at Charlotte, and the American 500 at Rockingham. He also collected four poles and finished third in the final points standings for the second year in a row. The 1984 season also brought Elliott his first season of winning NASCAR's Most Popular Driver Award, and would begin a stretch of five consecutive years, from 1984 to 1988, where he would win that award.

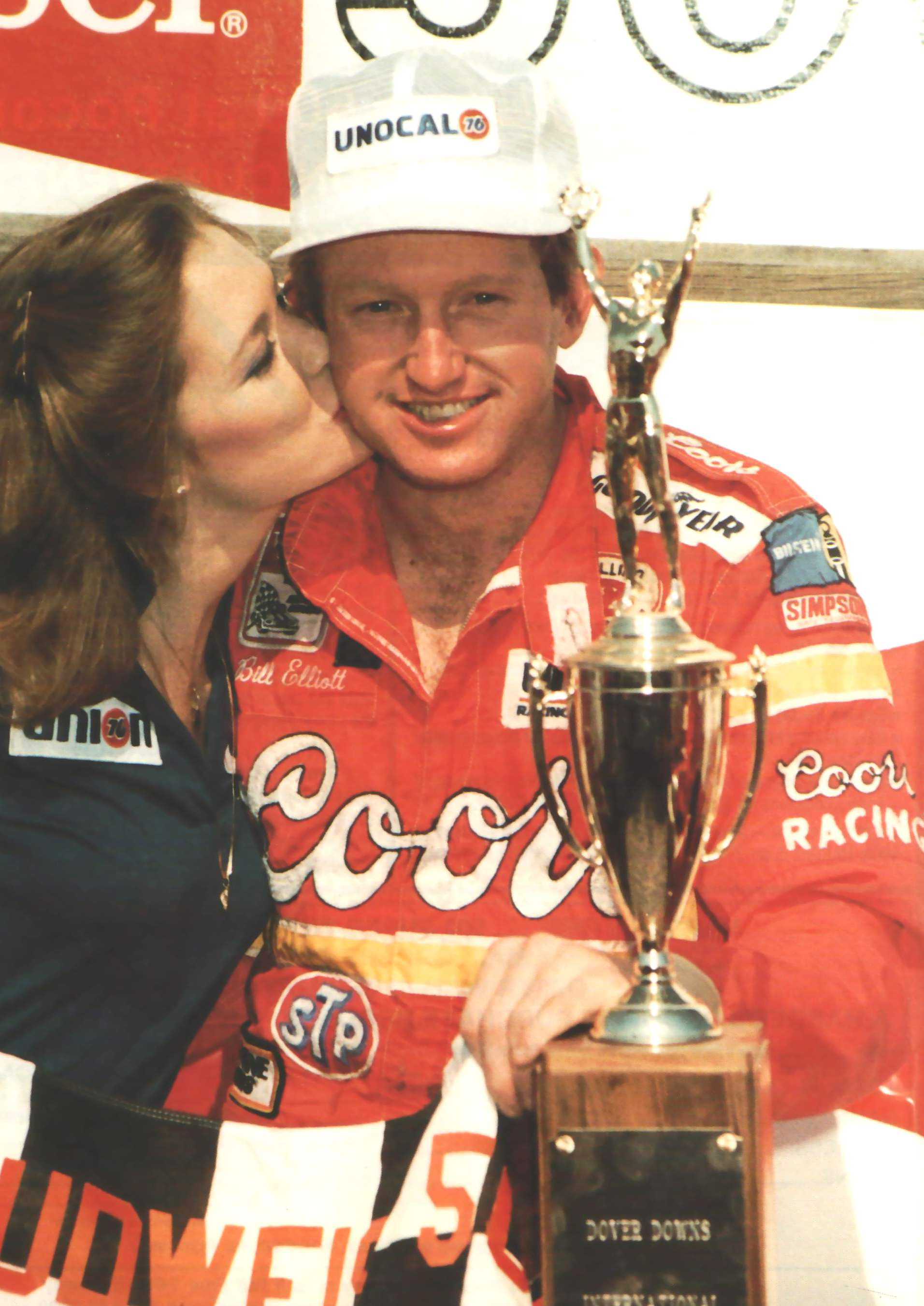
Elliott, after he won the Budweiser 500 at Dover Downs International Speedway in 1985

==== 1985: Winning the Winston Million ====
Before the beginning of the 1985 season, the R. J. Reynolds Tobacco Company and its core brand sponsor Winston began the Winston Million promotion. It offered a US$1 million bonus to any driver who could win three out of the four crown jewel races of NASCAR (a "Small Slam") in a single calendar year season; the Daytona 500 at Daytona (NASCAR's most prestigious race), the Winston 500 at Talladega (NASCAR's fastest race), the World 600 at Charlotte (NASCAR's longest race), and the Southern 500 at Darlington (NASCAR's oldest race). If there was no million-dollar winner, a $100,000 consolation bonus would be given to the first driver to win two of the four races.

The 1985 season was the best season of Elliott's career. He scored 11 wins and 11 poles out of 28 races and also went on to win the first ever Winston Million in the Southern 500 at Darlington. This would give him the nicknames "Million Dollar Bill" and "Awesome Bill From Dawsonville".

Elliott started the 1985 season first with a dominating victory in the Daytona 500, leading 136 of the 200 laps, starting from the pole position. This was the "first leg" of the Winston Million promotion that Elliott captured. His second win of the season came three weeks later at his home-track of Atlanta Motor Speedway, leading 129 of 328 laps. He would win again two weeks later, his third of the season, with a win in the spring race at Darlington. Going into the "second leg" of the Winston Million promotion, which was the Winston 500 at Talladega, Elliott completed one of the greatest and most memorable comebacks in NASCAR history. Elliott was leading the race when he had to pit due to a broken oil fitting, which would then put him back about two laps. He completed one of NASCAR's greatest comebacks by making his way through the field, making up both laps under green flag conditions without the aide of a caution, and winning the race, his fourth of the season, and capturing the "second leg" of the Winston Million promotion, which also guaranteed Elliott at the very least the $100,000 consolation bonus in the Winston Million promotion. The following week, Elliott captured his 5th win of the season at Dover. Despite losing power-steering in the car, he led 336 of the 500 laps, and won the race being the only car finishing on the lead lap. Going into the "third leg" of the Winston Million promotion, which was the World 600 at Charlotte, Elliott had a chance to capture the million dollar prize. Elliott had a strong car, leading 84 of the first 155 laps, but mechanical failures relegated him to an 18th place finish. This was the only major of the four that Elliott would not win in 1985 (a driver needed only to win a "small slam" of the four majors to win the bonus; Elliott, since he retired in 2013, would not finish a Career Grand Slam. However, Elliott had won twice at Charlotte Motor Speedway in 1984 and 1987, and had finished runner up in the World 600 twice, in 1982 and 1990).

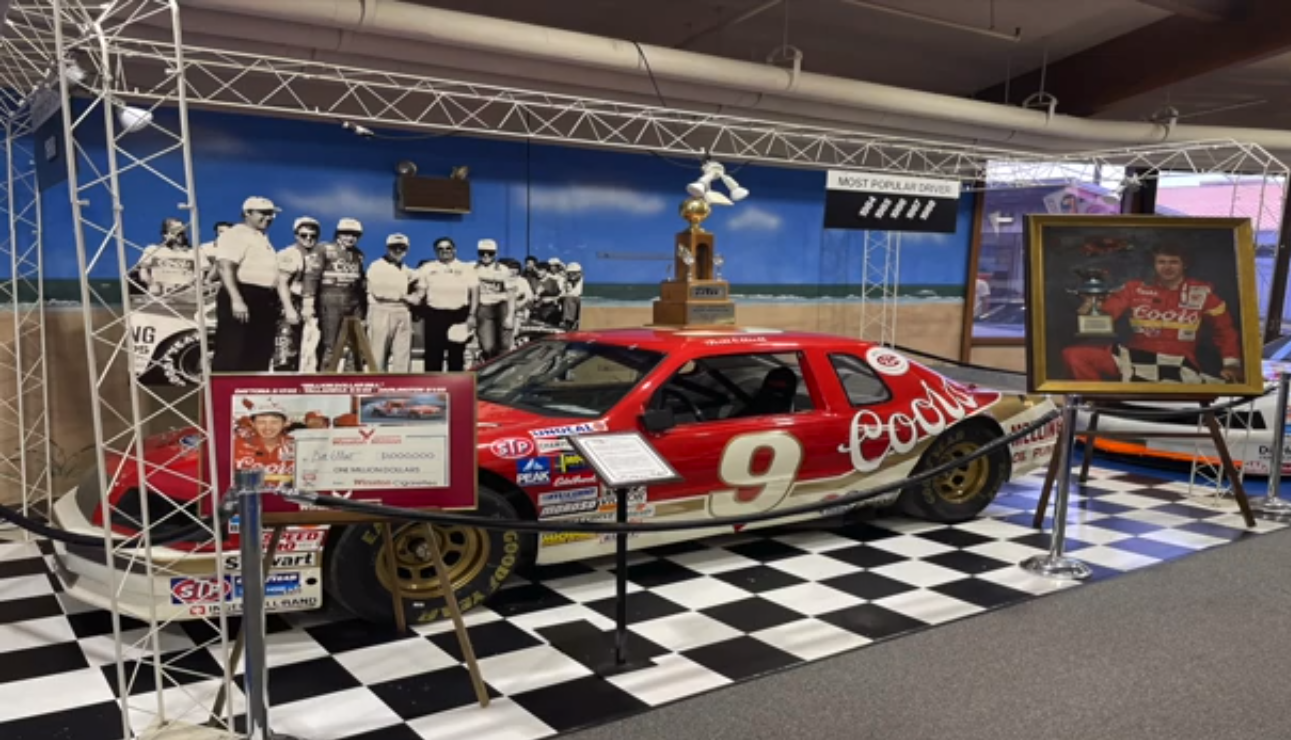
Bill Elliott's 1985 record setting Ford Thunderbird which set at the time, the fastest qualifying speed at 209.398 MPH for the 1985 Winston 500, and famously made up a two lap deficit to win the race, on display at the International Motorsports Hall of Fame at Talladega.

After the disappointing finish in the World 600, Elliott rebounded with a 6th place finish at Riverside. He would then go on a tear during the summer months of 1985, first winning back-to-back races, his 6th and 7th of the season, at Pocono and Michigan. Elliott would then lead the most laps, 103 of 160 laps, and finish 2nd in the Pepsi Firecracker 400 at Daytona to Greg Sacks. He followed that up with his 8th win of the season at Pocono, then leading 100 of 188 laps at Talladega and finishing 4th, and then leading 90 of 200 laps and winning at Michigan, his 9th of the season. It was also during this stretch, Elliott would set an unprecedented NASCAR record of winning five consecutive pole qualifying sessions in 1985; the June Pocono race, the Firecracker 400 at Daytona, the July races in Pocono and Talladega, and the August Michigan race. That did not include the June Michigan race where qualifying was rained out, and the July Pocono race pole was where he started second, but further investigation led NASCAR to throw out the winning pole time for illegal fuel additives, retroactively awarding Elliott the pole award, money, and credit towards the season-long award for most poles won.

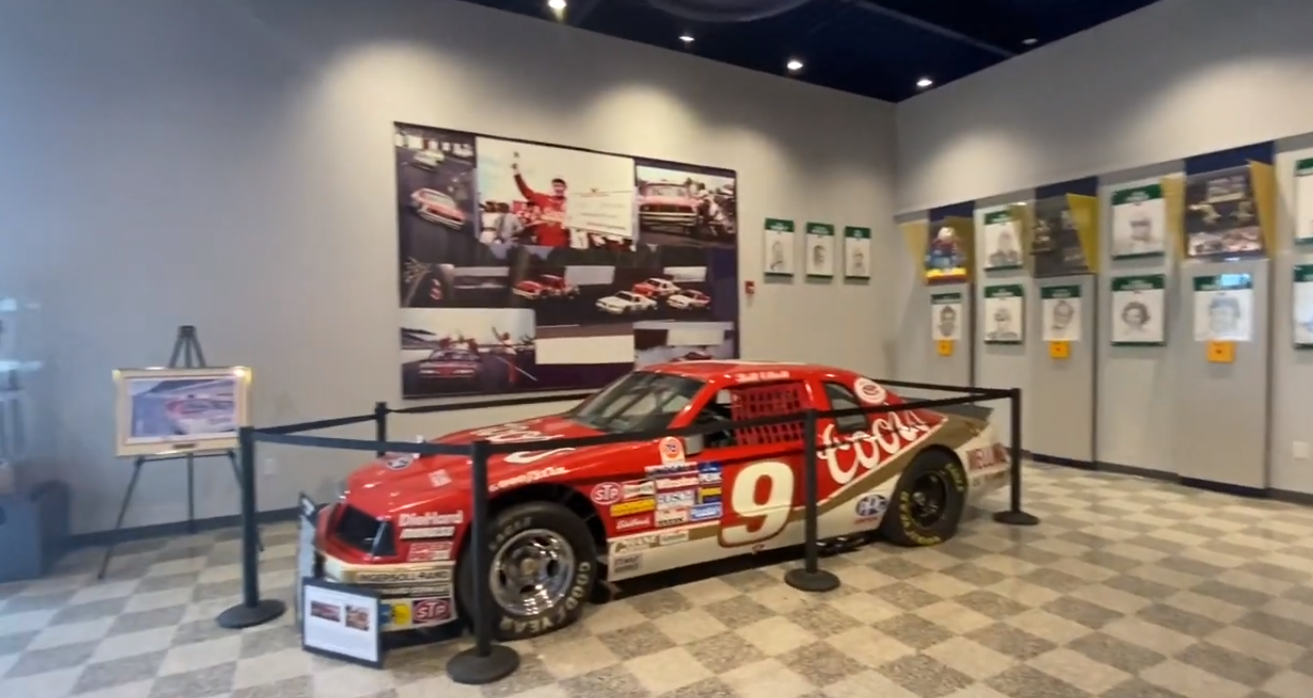
Bill Elliott's 1985 Southern 500 "Winston Million" winning Ford Thunderbird, on display at the National Motorsports Press Association Hall of Fame at Darlington.

After a 5th place finish at Bristol, Elliott had a chance to clinch the Winston Million Dollar Bonus in the next race, which was the fourth and "final leg" of the Winston Million Dollar promotion: the Southern 500 at Darlington. Multiple media outlets went to cover the race, as Elliott had the chance to collect the million dollar purse which at that time had never been done in stock car racing. Elliott started the race strong, but had to fend off tough competition throughout the race which included serious threats by Harry Gant and Dale Earnhardt, who dominated the early and middle portions of the race. Harry Gant led 84 laps before the engine gave way on his car, and Dale Earnhardt, who dominated most of the race leading 147 of the 367 laps, crashed out at around lap 318. In the final stages of the race, Elliott was leading and had to fend off a hard charging Cale Yarborough who was battling an ill-handling racecar after he broke a power-steering line. Nonetheless, Elliott led 100 of the 367 laps and crossed the finish line first, winning the Southern 500 at Darlington, capturing his 10th win of the season, and winning the first ever Winston Million Dollar Bonus, which at the time was the largest single race payday in motorsports history. After the race, Elliott took a victory lap in a Pontiac Grand Am convertible with the president and CEO of Winston Tobacco Products at the time, Gerald H. Long, and NASCAR Hall of Famer Ned Jarrett conducting the victory interview. In victory lane, Long presented Elliott with the Winston Million Dollar Bonus while being showered with "Million Dollar Bills", which would then end up being one of Bill Elliott's infamous nicknames he would carry throughout his illustrious career. After the race, Elliott became the second NASCAR driver to be featured on the cover of Sports Illustrated, following Cale Yarborough after his win in the 1977 Daytona 500.

After winning the Southern 500 at Darlington along with the Winston Million, Elliott had built a 206 point lead in the championship standings with eight races to go. However Elliott would lose the point lead after a string of poor finishes, which included a 12th at Richmond, 20th at Dover, 17th at Martinsville, and the transmission failing at North Wilkesboro, finishing 30th. In contrast, Darrell Waltrip won at Richmond, finished 2nd at both Dover and Martinsville, and finished 14th at North Wilkesboro, thus overtaking the points lead over Elliott. Elliott did come within twenty points of the championship lead after his 11th win of the season at Atlanta with one race to go. However in the season finale at Riverside, a 31st place finish due to a broken oil pump and a 7th place finish by Darrell Waltrip ended Elliott's championship hopes, as he finished in 2nd place in the final championship standings, 101 points behind Waltrip.

The 1985 season was still historic for Elliott. Along with winning the Winston Million, Elliott overall scored eleven wins, eleven poles (including five in a row), sixteen top-five finishes and eighteen top-ten finishes out of 28 races, while having an average starting position of 4.9 and an average finish of 8.7. His eleven superspeedway victories in 1985 set a NASCAR modern-era single season record which stands to this day, and he also tied another NASCAR modern-era record for completing the season sweep at 4 different tracks in one season: Pocono, Michigan, Darlington, and Atlanta (Darrell Waltrip had 4 "season sweeps" in 1982 at Bristol, North Wilkesboro, Talladega, and Nashville). At the end of the season, Elliott was voted the National Motorsports Press Association Driver of the Year for 1985.

==== 1986 ====
In 1986, Elliott won only two races, both being the Michigan races. With the season sweep at Michigan, Elliott became the first driver in NASCAR history to win four straight superspeedway races at one track (the record would later be tied by Dale Earnhardt Jr. at Talladega in 2003). He also won four poles during the season, and he finished fourth in the championship standings. He also won The 1986 Winston All-Star race, held at Atlanta. Ironically, Atlanta is his hometown track, being the closest to Dawsonville in the circuit. Also ironic, is that Elliott would remain the only winner of the All-Star race held somewhere other than Charlotte, until 2020 when his son Chase won his All-Star race at Bristol.

==== 1987: Battling Dale Earnhardt and qualifying records ====
Elliott started the 1987 season with a bang, first winning the Busch Clash during Daytona Speedweeks, then going on to win his second Daytona 500 in dominating fashion, starting from the pole position (his third consecutive Daytona 500 pole position), and leading 104 of the 200 laps. He won another five races that season, including the Talladega 500, another win at Michigan, and winning three of the final four races at Charlotte, Rockingham, and Atlanta. Elliott also won eight poles, and finished 2nd in the final championship point standings again, this time to Dale Earnhardt by 489 points. Elliott and Earnhardt were essentially the only two championship contenders all year in 1987, as both battled and tangled with each other all year. They both combined for winning 17 of the 29 races in 1987 (Earnhardt with 11 wins, Elliott with 6 wins), and finishing 1-2 four times that season, which included Earnhardt beating Elliott on a last lap pass in the spring race at Darlington, the TranSouth 500, when Elliott ran out of gas on the last lap. Elliott beat Earnhardt to the checkered flag three times in 1987 at Michigan, Rockingham, and the season finale at Atlanta. The most infamous moment between Elliott and Earnhardt occurred in The 1987 Winston All-Star race, when Elliott and Earnhardt tangled on the front-stretch at Charlotte, in what has become known in NASCAR lore as "The Pass In The Grass".

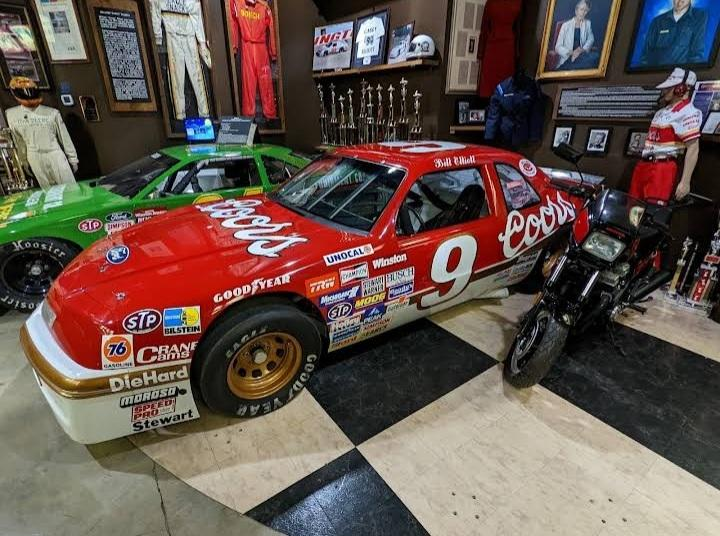
Bill Elliott's 1987 Daytona 500 Winning Ford Thunderbird, which also set the all-time fastest qualifying speed at Daytona International Speedway at 210.364 MPH, on display at the Georgia Racing Hall of Fame.

However, Elliott's most lasting accomplishment that year was setting two NASCAR qualifying records, which stand to this day. At Daytona for that year's Daytona 500, he set the NASCAR speed record with an average speed of 210.364 miles per hour (338.548 km/h). He broke his own record later that year at Talladega for that year's Winston 500, with an average speed of 212.809 miles per hour (342.483 km/h); the previous record he set in 1986 was 209.383 miles per hour (336.969 km/h). In both races, he used a Ford Thunderbird which contained an engine built by his brother Ernie Elliott. However, at Talladega, Bobby Allison was spun and went airborne into the Catch Fence, tearing a large section away and injuring several fans. After this incident, NASCAR mandated the use of restrictor plates at Daytona and Talladega. As a result, Elliott's speed records will likely never be broken.

==== The 1988 Winston Cup Championship season ====
In 1988, Elliott had one of the greatest seasons of his career when he captured his first and only Winston Cup Championship in NASCAR. In 29 races, Elliott won another six races, won another six poles, had a string of sixteen consecutive top-ten finishes, and did not have a race where he finished outside the top-twenty.

His first win of the season was at Bristol, where he was spun out by Geoff Bodine late in the race, but after pitting made his way back in the final four laps and won the race. Elliott won his second race of the season at Dover, leading 203 of 500 laps. In the June race at Pocono, Elliott finished 10th and would begin a string of 16 consecutive finishes inside the top-ten. During that run, Elliott finished runner-up in the first Michigan race, then won back-to-back races in the summer, the first one being his first Pepsi Firecracker 400 win at Daytona, followed by the July race at Pocono. After back-to-back 3rd place finishes at Watkins Glen and Michigan, Elliott overtook the points lead for the first time in the season with a 2nd place finish in the second race at Bristol. Elliott followed up taking the points lead after Bristol, by winning two of the next three races, both in dominating fashion; the first being his second Southern 500 victory at Darlington leading 154 of 367 laps, and then leading 392 of 500 laps completing the season sweep at Dover.

Going into the season finale, Elliott looked to win his first NASCAR Winston Cup championship at his home track of Atlanta. His only threat to the championship was Rusty Wallace, who entered the race winning three of the last four races and was 79 points behind Elliott. Elliott started 29th, but needed to finish 18th or better to clinch the championship regardless of what Wallace did in the race. Wallace dominated the race, starting on the pole, leading 166 of the 325 laps, and winning the race. Elliott drove carefully and conservatively through the field and finished 11th to claim the 1988 Winston Cup Championship by 24 points over Wallace. Elliott finished the season with six wins, six poles, 15 top-fives, 22 top-tens (including at one point sixteen in a row), and an average finish of 6.6.

==== Final years at Melling (1989–1991) ====
Following his championship season, Elliott broke his wrist in a crash during testing at Daytona and required relief by Jody Ridley during several races in the first part of the 1989 season. Elliott won two poles and three races, at Michigan, Pocono, and Phoenix, and finished sixth in the championship standings.

In 1990, Elliott won one race, at Dover, and two poles and finished fourth in the championship standings. In the 1990 race at Atlanta, Elliott's rear tire changer Mike Rich was killed when Ricky Rudd lost control of his car, spun, and slammed the crew member between his car and Elliott's. As a result, NASCAR restricted the cars' speed on pit road.

The 1991 season saw Elliott's sponsorship change to Coors Light and the familiar red on the car was replaced with blue. Elliott would only win once that year in the Pepsi 400 at Daytona and won two poles. After a year of struggle, Elliott finished a disappointing eleventh in the championship standings, causing him and Coors to part ways with the Mellings. That lone win in 1991 would be the only time in his career that Elliott won in a car that was not painted red.

Overall, in ten seasons from 1982-1991, Melling Racing set several NASCAR records, winning the Winston Million in 1985, winning the 1988 Winston Cup Championship, and winning a total of 34 career races, all of these accomplishments with only Elliott. The success of Melling Racing may have come to an end after Elliott left at the end of 1991, but Elliott would be more successful in the years to come.

=== Junior Johnson & Associates (1992–1994) ===
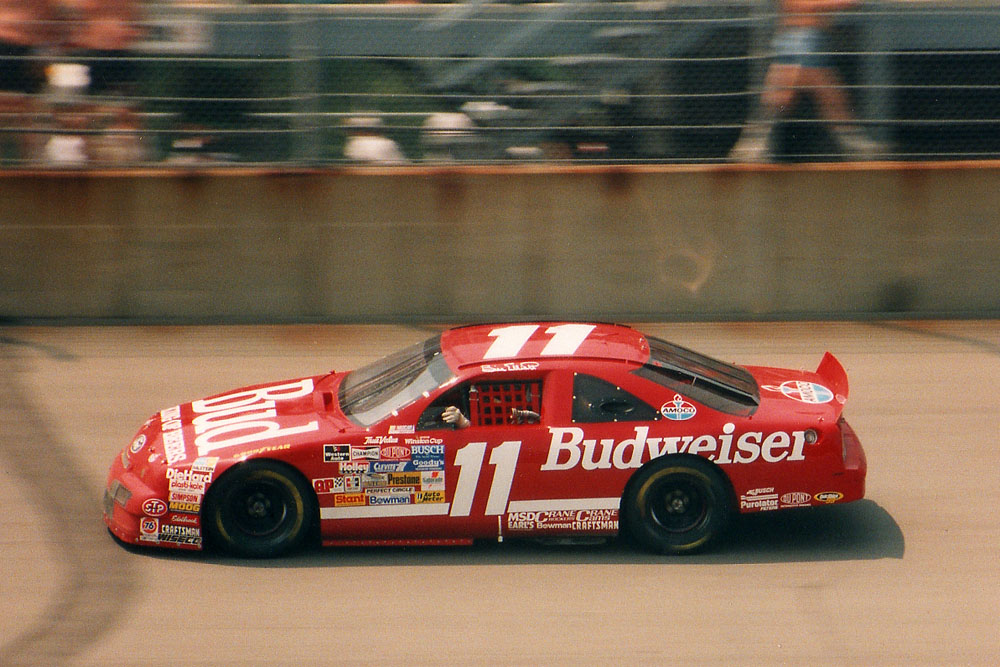
Elliott's 1994 Ford Thunderbird

==== 1992 and the Hooters 500 ====
Elliott left Melling to join Junior Johnson & Associates in 1992, replacing Geoff Bodine in the No. 11 Budweiser-sponsored Ford. Elliott would find success almost immediately in 1992. After a disappointing 27th place finish in the Daytona 500, Elliott would then win the next four consecutive races at Rockingham, Richmond, Atlanta, and Darlington. Elliott's strong season would continue, which included a 2nd place finish at Talladega, leading the most laps at Sonoma finishing 5th, leading the most laps at the second Michigan race finishing 3rd, and leading the most laps, 261 of 500 laps, in the fall race at Dover and finishing 2nd.

After the fall Dover race, Elliott found himself with a 154 point lead in the championship standings with six races remaining. However, much like the ending of the 1985 season, Elliott would lose the point lead after a string of poor finishes. Elliott's lead disappeared thanks to a batch of poor finishes, which included mechanical problems beginning with an engine failure at Martinsville leading to a 30th place finish, a 26th place finish at North Wilkesboro, a broken sway bar while running in the top-five with less than forty laps to go at Charlotte leading to a 30th place finish, and a cracked cylinder head leading to another engine failure at Phoenix, finishing 31st. The string of poor finishes dropped Elliott out of the points lead to third place, 40 points behind 1st place Davey Allison and 10 points behind 2nd place Alan Kulwicki, with one race to go.

The season finale in 1992 was the Hooters 500 at Atlanta, and is regarded by many as one of the greatest races in NASCAR history. It was the final career race for NASCAR legend Richard Petty, while future NASCAR legend Jeff Gordon was making his first career start. Six drivers had a mathematical shot to win the championship, with the points leader Davey Allison, Alan Kulwicki, and Elliott being the primary contenders. Harry Gant, Kyle Petty, and Mark Martin also had long shots to win the championship. After Allison crashed out late in the race, the championship came down to Elliott and Kulwicki who ran 1-2 together throughout the later stages of the race. The championship would be determined between the two, by whoever picked up the five extra bonus points for leading the most laps in the race. Elliott would go on to win the race leading 102 of the 325 laps, while Kulwicki finished 2nd to Elliott, leading 103 of the 325 laps. Kulwicki picked up the five point bonus for leading one single lap more than Elliott, and by finishing second was able to maintain and keep his ten point cushion on Elliott to win the 1992 Winston Cup Championship. Had Kulwicki not led the most laps, Elliott would have finished tied with him for the points lead and would have been awarded the championship on a tiebreaker due to him having more wins in 1992 (Elliott had won five races that year, to Kulwicki's two). Elliott finished the 1992 season with five wins, three poles, 14 top-fives, 17 top-tens, and finishing 2nd in the final championship standings for a third time, this time by only a mere ten points which remained the closest margin in NASCAR history until 2004, and eventually the 2011 season.

==== Final years at Johnson (1993–1994) ====
Elliott went winless for the first time in ten years during the 1993 season and finished 8th in the standings. Elliott did however pick up his first, and one lone career win in the O'Reilly Auto Parts Series (formerly known at the time, as the Busch Grand National Series) in 1993, at the road course of Watkins Glen.

Elliott scored just one win the following season in 1994; his 3rd win in the Southern 500 at Darlington. It was the 40th win of Elliott's career, and would be the last win Elliott would capture in NASCAR until 2001, more than six years later. It also eventually became the final win for the team of Junior Johnson & Associates. Elliott finished the 1994 season finishing 10th in the championship standings. After his Darlington victory, Elliott announced he would be leaving Junior Johnson & Associates, and start his own team with sponsorship from McDonald's (leaving Johnson's other car, the No. 27 of Jimmy Spencer) beginning in 1995.

=== Owner–driver (1995–2000) ===
==== Elliott-Hardy Racing ====
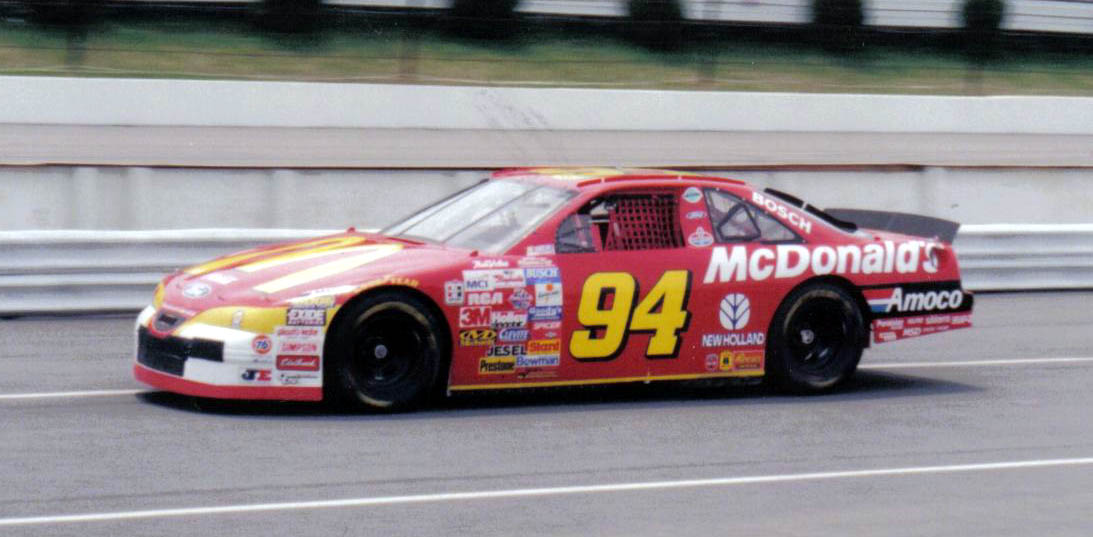
1997 racecar

After leaving Johnson's team, Elliott fielded his own Winston Cup race team from 1995 to 2000. He used the No. 94 in honor of his nephew, Casey Elliott, who was battling cancer at the time he formed the team and would die in 1996. The team also fielded entries in the Busch Series and Truck Series. Elliott failed to win a race during this time, though he did manage two top-ten finishes in the championship standings, with 8th-place finishes in 1995 and 1997.

In 1996, Elliott missed five races to recover from injuring a broken hip at Talladega and was replaced by Dorsey Schroeder and Todd Bodine.

==== Bill Elliott Racing ====
In July 1996, the partnership between Elliott and Hardy was dissolved, the team being renamed Bill Elliott Racing. Later in 1996, Elliott suffered effects after an accident at Talladega earlier in the year and, Elliott missed two races and was replaced by Tommy Kendall and Bobby Hillin Jr. Elliott also made his first career start in the Truck Series driving for Jim Smith's team Ultra Motorsports at Las Vegas Motor Speedway, finishing 2nd.

The 1997 season, was undoubtedly Elliott's best season as a driver/owner statistically. He finished the season with one pole, five top-five finishes, 14 top-ten finishes, and finishing 8th in the final point standings. Elliott did not win any races, but came extremely close on several occasions. He was leading late in the 1997 Daytona 500, leading with less than ten laps to go, until a late caution came out. On the ensuing restart, he would then get ganged up by the Hendrick Motorsports teammates of eventual winner Jeff Gordon, Terry Labonte, and Ricky Craven, ultimately finishing 4th. Elliott's best finish during his six year run as a driver/owner was at Michigan in 1997, finishing 2nd to Ernie Irvan. Elliott also dominated that year's Southern 500 leading 181 of the 367 laps, but finished 4th to eventual winner Jeff Gordon, who ironically, along with winning the race also joined Elliott as the only winners of the Winston Million, as Jeff won the "final running" of the Winston Million promotion in 1997, while Bill won the "initial running" of the promotion in 1985.

In 1998, Elliott teamed up with Dan Marino to form a multi-car team, the team was renamed Elliott-Marino Motorsports, adding the No. 13 and keeping the No. 94, Marino owned the No. 13 while Elliott owned the No. 94. The year was marked with sadness for Elliott when he had to miss the fall Dover race to attend the funeral of his father. Matt Kenseth drove Elliott's No. 94 and finished 6th in his Winston Cup Series debut.

After a disappointing 1999 season which saw Elliott's multi-car operation dissolve back into No. 94, Elliott announced in early 2000 he was selling his equipment to championship-winning crew chief Ray Evernham to become part of Dodge's return to NASCAR. The team would also switch to No. 9, which was owned by Melling, his championship-winning team. Even though he struggled the entire six years as a driver/owner and did not win a single race, Elliott's fans still voted him as NASCAR's Most Popular Driver. He would hold the record for 10 straight years as a most popular driver from 1991 to 2000, a record that would stand until 2013, when Dale Earnhardt Jr. would win his 11th straight award. Earnhardt would win the award for fifteen straight years from 2003 to 2017, a NASCAR record.

=== Evernham Motorsports (2001–2003) ===
==== 2001: Dodge's return to NASCAR and Elliott's first win in 7 years ====
In 2000, Elliott sold his team to Ray Evernham and began driving the No. 9 Dodge Dealers/UAW Dodge Intrepid the following year. Melling Racing, who ran the No. 9 for Bill Elliott from 1981 to 1991, yielded that number to Ray Evernham for 2001. Elliott asked Evernham to drive that number out of respect for his old team. Elliott and Evernham however found success in its very first race in the No. 9 Dodge, as Elliott won the pole for the 2001 Daytona 500. It would also be the 50th pole of his career. By winning the pole, Bill Elliott would become the first, and as of 2018, the only driver in NASCAR history to score his 50th career pole in the Daytona 500. He would finish the race in the top-five, bringing home a 5th place finish.

Elliott finished his first season with Evernham Motorsports with two poles, five top-fives, nine top-tens, and one win in the Pennzoil Freedom 400 at Homestead–Miami from the pole position. Elliott won the race by passing his Evernham Motorsports teammate Casey Atwood with five laps to go. This was his first win since the Southern 500 in 1994, seven years and 226 races. As of 2025, the 226 race winless streak is the longest drought, between wins, in NASCAR history. However, after Melling yielded the No. 9 for 2001, Bill Elliott would win at Homestead driving that number, but this time, with Evernham Motorsports. It was the team's first-ever win. In another ironic twist, Elliott winning at Homestead would be the first time since Melling Racing and Elliott himself at the Pepsi 400 in 1991, that the No. 9 went to victory lane. Elliott finished fifteenth in the final points standings for 2001. Elliott also withdrew from the ballot as NASCAR's Most Popular Driver for fans to vote for Dale Earnhardt.

==== 2002: Back-to-back wins at Pocono and Indianapolis ====
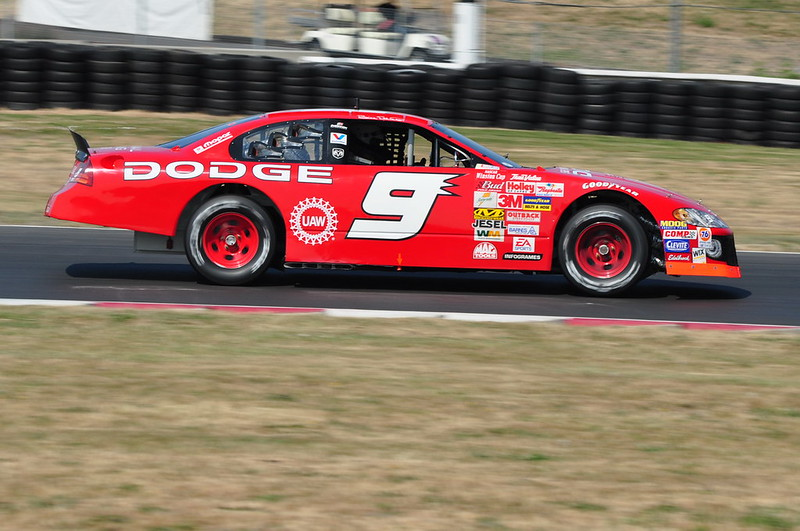
Bill Elliott's 2002 Dodge Dealers UAW Dodge Intrepid at Sonoma.

In 2002, Elliott won four poles and went to victory lane twice in memorable back-to-back races. The first of those wins included the Pennsylvania 500 at Pocono, which at the time made Elliott the winningest driver at Pocono Raceway with five career wins (Denny Hamlin and Jeff Gordon have since surpassed him at seven and six wins each respectively). A week later, Elliott had one of the most memorable and dominant victories in the history of the Brickyard 400 at Indianapolis Motor Speedway. He started on the outside pole, and dominated the race leading 93 of 160 laps. In the closing laps, he and Rusty Wallace battled it out for the lead, with Elliott passing Rusty with 12 laps to go, en route to victory.

After the back-to-back victories at Pocono and Indy, Elliott was sixth in points. Four weeks later after a 3rd place finish in the Southern 500 at Darlington, Elliott then found himself seventh in points with eleven races to go, and on his way to finishing the season in the top-ten in points for the first time since 1997. After a fifth place finish at Kansas and a 19th place finish at Talladega, Elliott was eighth in points with six races to go. However, a string of five consecutive finishes of 30th or worse, which included a 42nd place finish after a crash at Martinsville, and a bad water pump leading to a 39th place finish at Rockingham, ultimately dropped Elliott from 8th to finishing a disappointing 13th in the final points standings. Elliott finished the 2002 season with two wins, four poles, six top-fives, 13 top-tens, and for the 16th and final time in his career, Elliott was voted as NASCAR's Most Popular Driver.

==== 2003: Final full-time season ====
The 2003 season ultimately became Elliott's final full-time season. It was a struggle through the first 26 races of the season, as Bill only had five Top 10 finishes and was 16th in points. In the final ten races, Elliott went from 16th in points to finishing 9th in the overall standings, as he finished in the top-fifteen in all ten races, had five top-five finishes, seven top-ten finishes, and led the most laps in three of the final seven races which included Elliott's final victory of his career.

In the final seven races of the season starting at Kansas, Elliott started 8th and led the most laps, 115 of 267 laps, and finished 2nd to Ryan Newman who won on fuel strategy. Elliott followed that up with a 4th place finish at Charlotte, a 9th place finish at Martinsville, and a 4th place finish at Atlanta. Two weeks later, Elliott captured what would be the final win of his career at Rockingham (Ironically enough, at the same track where he made his first career NASCAR start back in 1976). Elliott officially started 5th, but had to start dead last in the back of the field due to an engine change after qualifying. He still managed to climb through the field and lead the most laps of the race, leading 140 of the 393 laps, en route to capturing his 44th and final NASCAR race win over future seven-time NASCAR champion Jimmie Johnson. A week later in the season finale, Elliott came within a lap of winning his final race as a full-time driver in the Ford 400 at Homestead–Miami. Elliott dominated the entire race, leading 189 of the 267 laps and was on his way to victory, but a cut tire on the final lap in turn two allowed Bobby Labonte to score the victory (which ended up being the final win of Bobby's career). Elliott still finished the race in 8th place and maintained his 9th place position in the final points standings, his best points finish since finishing 8th in the 1997 standings.

Elliott officially withdrew from the ballot as NASCAR's Most Popular Driver, giving the award to Dale Earnhardt Jr., who would go on to win for 15 straight years from 2003 to 2017, a NASCAR record. A few weeks later after the 2003 season ended, Elliott announced that he was relinquishing the No. 9 car to Kasey Kahne and switching to a part-time schedule driving R&D cars for Evernham.

=== Semi-retirement (2004–2012) ===
==== Evernham Motorsports ====
In 2004, Elliott drove the No. 91 Dodge Intrepid for Evernham in three events (along with the Budweiser Shootout). While he only made three starts during his first part-time season with Evernham, he still managed to have some success which included 2nd and 10th place qualifying efforts at Texas and Las Vegas, and also a 9th place finish at Indianapolis which ended up being the 320th and final top-ten finish of his career. He also brought back the Bill Elliott Racing moniker when he drove the 98 car twice in 2004, one with Coke C2 Sponsorship and one with McDonald's. The reason is that Evernham fielded cars with sponsorship with PepsiCo's Mountain Dew. He did also manage a 3rd-place qualifying effort at Fontana.

In 2005, Elliott continued his part-time driving duties which included driving the No. 39 Coors Dodge Charger (in a paint scheme reminiscent of his 1987 Coors Light Ford) for Chip Ganassi Racing in the Budweiser Shootout and the No. 91 Evernham Dodge in several events. Although he made three more starts than the previous season, he did not have the same amount of success. He managed to get an eleventh place finish and a tenth place qualifying effort at Michigan, along with a ninth place qualifying effort at Texas. He also competed in select NASCAR Busch Series events for Rusty Wallace and also drove the No. 6 Unilever Dodge Charger in the Busch Series for Evernham at Memphis, which celebrated the 40th anniversary of A Charlie Brown Christmas.

For the 2006 season, the 2005 owners' points for the No. 91 team went to the new No. 10 Evernham team and driver Scott Riggs and the No. 91 team was discontinued.

On August 8, 2006, Evernham Motorsports announced that Elliott would return to the organization for the race at Watkins Glen driving the No. 19 Dodge previously driven by Jeremy Mayfield. The team fell out of the top-35 in owners' points after Indianapolis, leading to the firing of Mayfield, and Evernham assumed that Elliott would guarantee a starting spot in the field by being a past champion. However, since the driver switch was made past the entry deadline, NASCAR said that Elliott was not eligible for the past champions provisional.

==== Mach 1 Racing ====
Elliott also drove the No. 98 Dodge Intrepid for Mach 1 Racing in three other events in 2004 because of sponsorship issues between Coca-Cola (Elliott's sponsor) and Pepsi (Evernham's sponsor). But Evernham leased the car to him. Although he only made three starts during his first part-time season as a driver, he still managed to have some success which included a third place qualifying effort at Fontana respectively.

==== MB2 Motorsports ====
On January 4, 2006, Elliott announced that he would pilot the No. 36 Chevrolet Monte Carlo SS for MB2 Motorsports in the 2006 Daytona Speedweeks events. This included the Budweiser Shootout, the Gatorade Duel, and the Daytona 500, which Elliott had not competed in since 2003.

==== Michael Waltrip Racing ====
On March 17, 2006, it was announced that Elliott would drive the No. 00 Burger King Chevrolet for Michael Waltrip Racing in five NEXTEL Cup events which included Chicagoland, New Hampshire, Indianapolis, Fontana, and Homestead.

==== R&J Racing ====
For the race at Kansas, Elliott teamed up with R&J Racing to drive the No. 37 Dodge. Elliott finished a season-high sixteenth at the Banquet 400 at Kansas but did not qualify for the Bank of America 500 at Charlotte two weeks later. Elliott was scheduled to be the Team Red Bull entry for Atlanta, but A. J. Allmendinger drove the car instead, Elliott instead drove the No. 37 Dodge at Atlanta, marking the thirtieth anniversary of Elliott driving at his hometown track.

Elliott attempted to qualify for the 2007 Daytona 500, but failed to make the race in the No. 37.

==== Wood Brothers Racing ====
Later that season, Elliott signed to drive the No. 21 for Wood Brothers Racing in 2007, in part due to his championship provisional, which guaranteed to start the race. Since fellow champion Dale Jarrett had used all of his guaranteed starts in his Toyota for Michael Waltrip Racing, Elliott was the only champion eligible for the provisional not guaranteed a spot by being in the top-35 in owner's points. His first race for the team was the Coca-Cola 600 at Charlotte, which he qualified without needing one of his six provisionals. He led the race at one point until he was involved in a wreck around lap 200. At Michigan, Elliott gave the team a much-needed eleventh place finish and was kept in the car until the fall Richmond race. The car then fell out of the top-35 again but at Bristol got back into the top-35 in points. Ken Schrader returned to the No. 21 replacing Elliott at a testing session at Talladega Superspeedway due to the team being back in the Top 35 in owner's points. He returned for the final four races after the No. 21 fell out of the top-35 once again.

On September 23, 2007, in an interview with Charlotte Observer, Len Wood the co-owner of the No. 21 said Elliott would have his own sponsor and share a ride with Jon Wood and Marcos Ambrose for 2008. Elliott returned to the No. 21 to try to get the car back into the Top 35 points at Lowe's Motor Speedway.

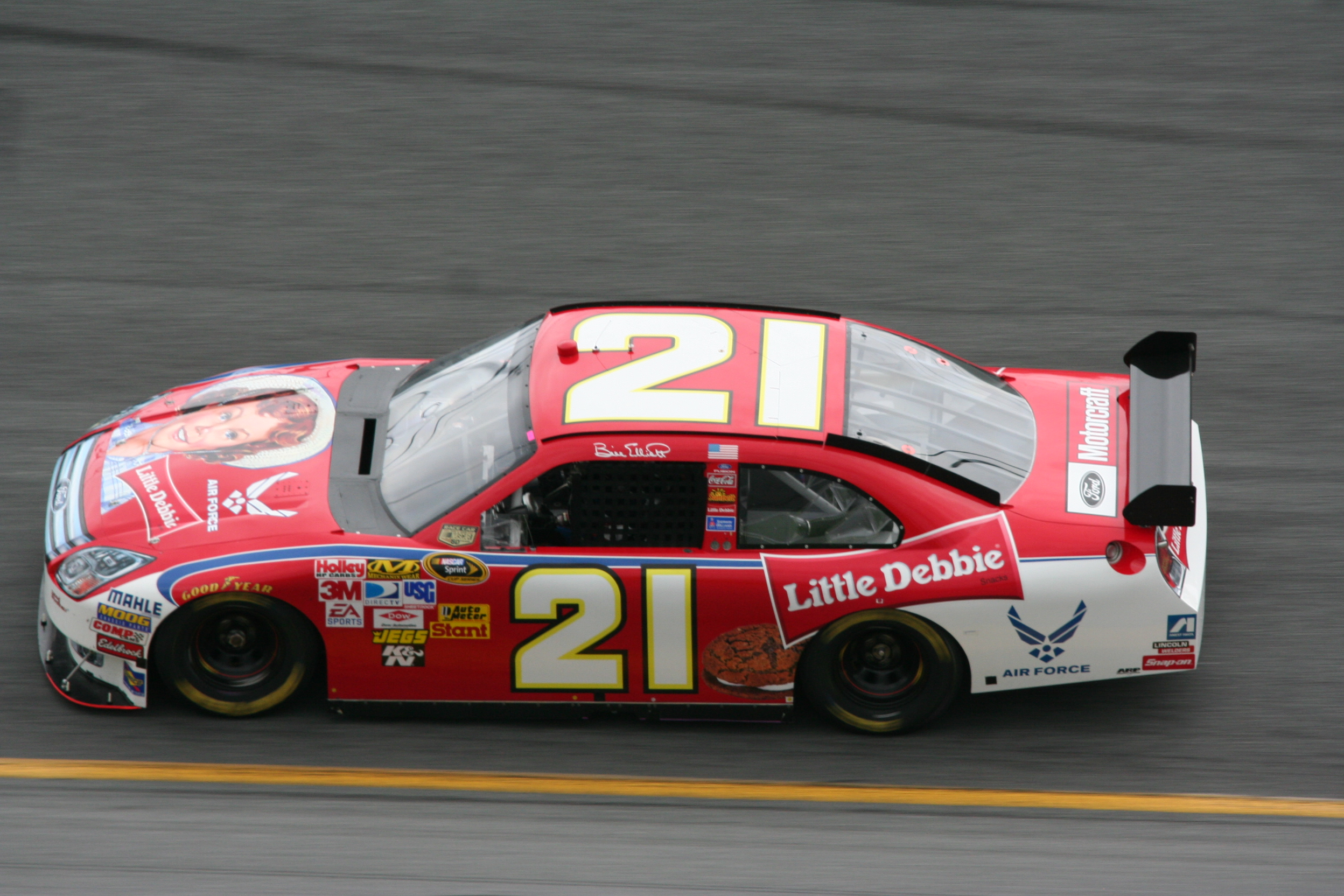
2008 Cup car at Daytona

Elliott qualified for ten races that season, with a best finish of 20th in the Sunoco Presents: The American Red Cross Pennsylvania 500 at Pocono Raceway. At Daytona, Elliott announced that 2008 would be his final season as a Sprint Cup driver. But in an interview on NASCAR Raceday at Kansas, Elliott was asked about him racing and said "We will be at Lowe's, and do a few more races. Then we will see how things go." In 2008, his best starts were fifth at Bristol and seventh at Kansas. His best finish was twelfth at Homestead–Miami Speedway.

In 2009, Elliott ran twelve races in the No. 21 Motorcraft Ford for the Wood Brothers, including the Daytona 500. His best finish in 2009 was fifteenth place at Lowe's Motor Speedway.

On Memorial Day May 25, 2009, Elliott became the seventh member of the "800 club", with his eigh-hundredth career Sprint Cup start at Lowes Motor Speedway.

Elliott ran for the Wood Brothers in 2010. He also drove at Talladega for Latitude 43 Motorsports.

==== Phoenix Racing ====
In 2011, Elliott did not return to Wood Brothers Racing, but ran four races for Phoenix Racing in the No. 09 Chevy. Elliott stepped out of the ride to assist his son Chase in the K&N Pro Series East. Landon Cassill would take over the car for the fifth race of the season, which was eventually renumbered to No. 51.

==== Whitney Motorsports ====
Elliott was entered as the driver of the No. 46 Red Line Oil Chevrolet for Whitney Motorsports at Talladega but J. J. Yeley would finish the race.

==== NEMCO Motorsports ====
For the 2012 season, Elliott joined Joe Nemechek at NEMCO Motorsports to drive the No. 97 Toyota in the 2012 Daytona 500, but failed to qualify for the race. Elliott successfully qualified for the Sprint Cup race at Talladega driving the No. 97, but finished in 37th.

==== Turner Motorsports ====
Elliott made his third start of the 2012 season driving for Turner Motorsports in the July race at Daytona International Speedway, in the No. 50 Walmart Chevrolet. Elliott qualified fifth, and ran in the top-ten throughout the first half of the race, but finished 37th after being involved in an accident. This was his 828th and final start in the NASCAR Sprint Cup Series.

==== GMS Racing ====
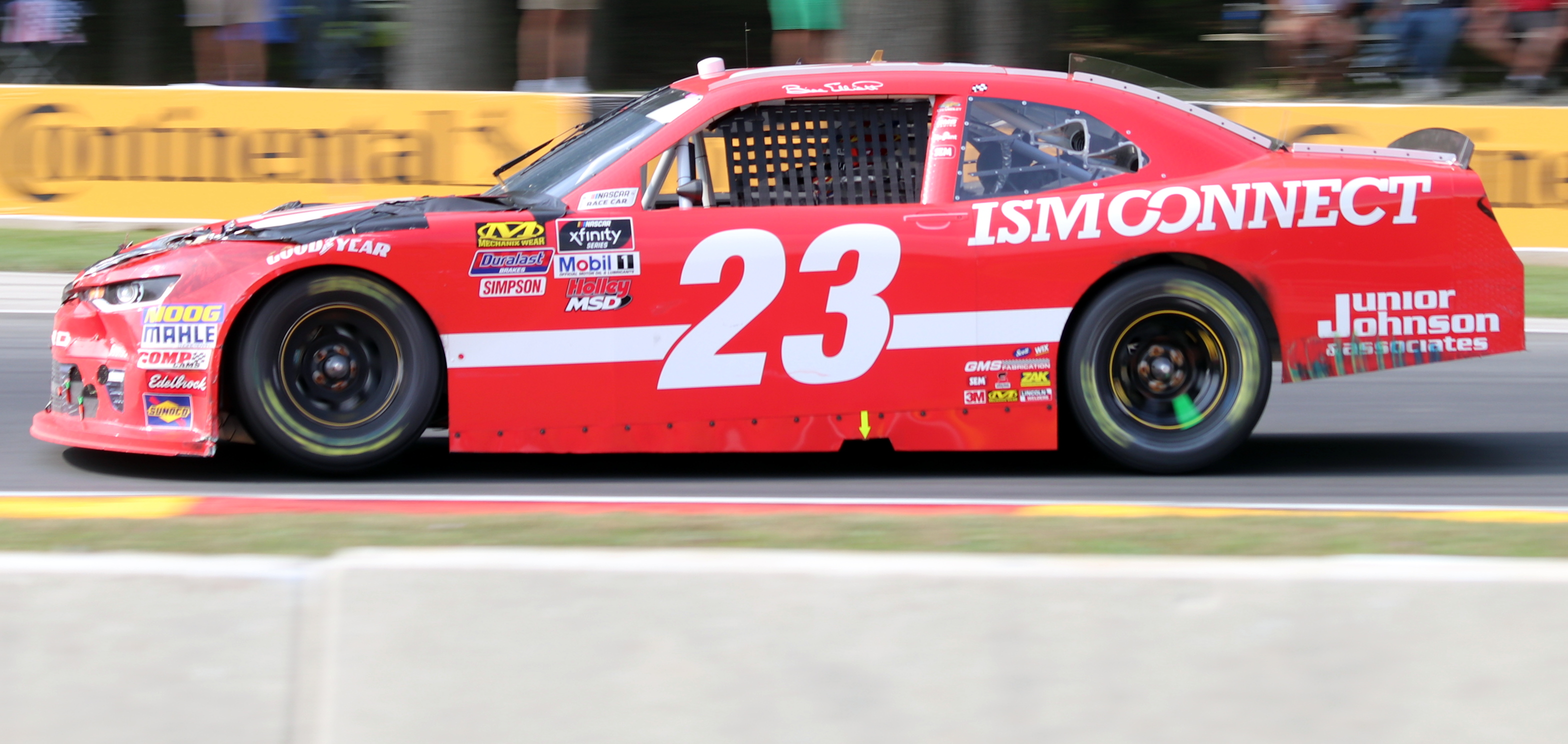
Elliott racing at Road America in 2018

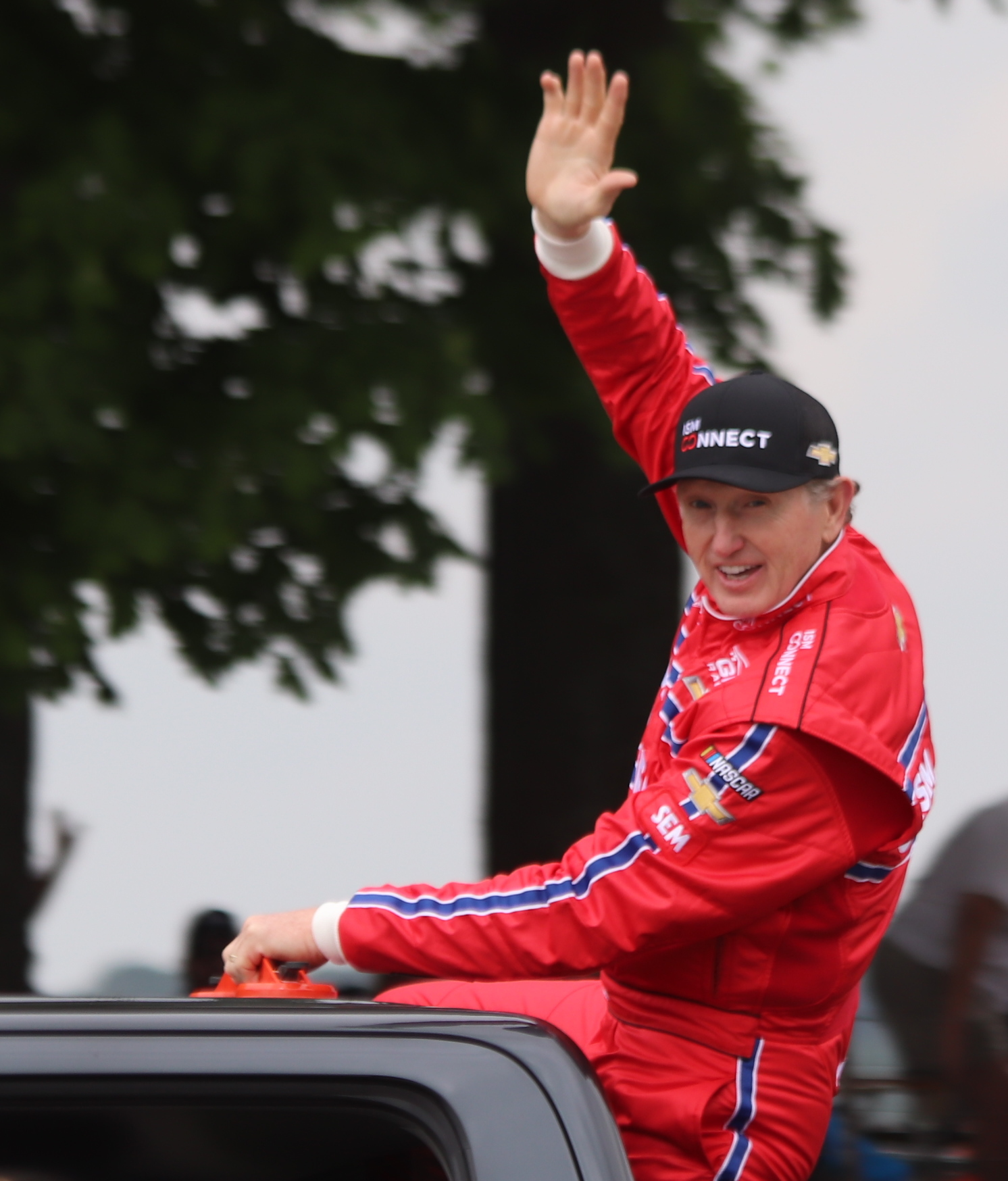
Elliott waves to fans during driver's introductions at Road America in 2018

On August 4, 2018, GMS Racing announced that Elliott would return to NASCAR, driving the No. 23 Chevrolet Camaro at Road America in the Xfinity Series on August 25. It was Elliott's first Xfinity start since 2005 and first National Series start since 2012. He finished in twentieth on the lead lap. After the race, he quipped "I feel like I hit everything but the lottery, I mean it was a great day."

== Other racing ==
In 2021, Elliott was a full-time driver at the inaugural season of the Superstar Racing Experience, Tony Stewart's stock car racing series. His best result was third at the Nashville Fairgrounds Speedway, and he finished ninth in points. Elliott entered two rounds of the 2022 season.

In February 2026, he participated in the Sportscar Vintage Racing Association weekend at Sebring International Raceway with Chase's CARS Pro Cup Series car.

== Legacy and honors ==
At the time of Elliott's "semi-retirement", he ranked 14th on NASCAR's all-time win list with 44 wins. As of 2025, he ranks 19th on NASCAR's all-time wins list. His 44 career wins does not include six exhibition wins, which include one "Winston All-Star Race" win in 1986, one "Busch Clash" win in 1987, and four Gatorade Twin 125 wins at Daytona in 1985, 1986, 1992, and 2000. He retired with 55 career poles, which ranks 8th on the all-time poles list. Elliott won seven crown jewel races in his career, two in the Daytona 500 (1985, 1987), three in the Southern 500 (1985, 1988, 1994), one in the Winston 500 (1985), and one in the Brickyard 400 (2002). The only crown jewel race Elliott failed to win was the World 600 (he had a pair of second-place finishes in 1982 and 1990).

The majority of Elliott's success came in the 10 seasons from 1982 to 1991 with Melling Racing and owner Harry Melling, along with Bill's two older brothers, crew chief and engine builder Ernie Elliott and transmission specialist Dan Elliott. Together, they won 34 of Bill's 44 race wins, set numerous NASCAR records, won the Winston Million in 1985, and won the NASCAR Winston Cup Championship in 1988. Elliott was one of NASCAR's most endearing and popular drivers in history, as Elliott went on to win NASCAR's Most Popular Driver Award a NASCAR record 16 times (1984–1988, 1991–2000, 2002), a record nearly matched by Dale Earnhardt Jr. who won the award for 15 straight years from 2003 to 2017.

Elliott set numerous NASCAR records throughout his career, many of which still stand to this day. They include the following:

- Fastest qualifying speed at Daytona International Speedway; 1987 Daytona 500 - 210.364 MPH (338.548 km/h)
- Fastest qualifying speed at Talladega Superspeedway; 1987 Winston 500 - 212.809 MPH (342.483 km/h)
- Modern-era record of 11 superspeedway victories in one season; 11 in 1985
- Modern-era record of four season sweeps in one season; 1985 - Pocono, Michigan, Darlington, and Atlanta (Tied with Darrell Waltrip in 1982; Bristol, North Wilkesboro, Talladega, and Nashville)
- Four consecutive wins at one superspeedway; Michigan from 1985-1986 (Tied with Dale Earnhardt Jr. at Talladega from 2001-2003)
- Modern-era record four consecutive race wins; 1992 at Rockingham, Richmond, Atlanta and Darlington (Tied with Cale Yarborough in 1976, Darrell Waltrip in 1981, Dale Earnhardt in 1987, Harry Gant in 1991, Mark Martin in 1993, Jeff Gordon in 1998, and Jimmie Johnson in 2007)
- Most career Daytona 500 poles; 4 in 1985-1987, 2001 (Tied with Buddy Baker and Cale Yarborough)
- Three consecutive Daytona 500 poles; 1985-1987 (Tied with Fireball Roberts 1961-1963 and Ken Schrader 1988-1990)
- Most career pole positions at Talladega Superspeedway; 8 (2×1985, 2×1986, 2×1987, 1990, 1993)
- Six consecutive pole positions at Talladega Superspeedway; 1985-1987
- Longest winless drought between wins; 226 races (1994 Southern 500 at Darlington - 2001 Pennzoil Freedom 400 at Homestead-Miami)

Elliott is widely considered as one of the greatest and most well-respected racecar drivers, not only in NASCAR history, but in motorsports history as a whole. In 1998, Elliott was selected as one of NASCAR's 50 Greatest Drivers in its history, and has been honored by being inducted into numerous racing and motorsports Halls of Fame. They include:

- Georgia Sports Hall of Fame inductee in 1998
- An inaugural inductee into the Georgia Racing Hall of Fame in 2002 (Along with Elliott, the inaugural Georgia Racing Hall of Fame Class of 2002 also included Red Byron, Tim Flock, Roy Hall, Raymond Parks, Lloyd Seay, Gober Sosebee, and Red Vogt). Elliott's father George (Class of 2011), and his two older brothers Ernie (Class of 2010), and Dan (Class of 2018) would also become inductees into the Georgia Racing Hall of Fame.
- Motorsports Hall of Fame of America inductee in 2007
- National Motorsports Press Association Hall of Fame inductee in 2015
- NASCAR Hall of Fame Class of 2015 (inducted along with Fred Lorenzen, Wendell Scott, Joe Weatherly, and Rex White). Elliott was presented into the NASCAR Hall of Fame by his former Evernham Motorsports car owner, and future NASCAR Hall of Fame Class of 2018 inductee, Ray Evernham, and the driver who followed Bill in the famed #9 car, Kasey Kahne.

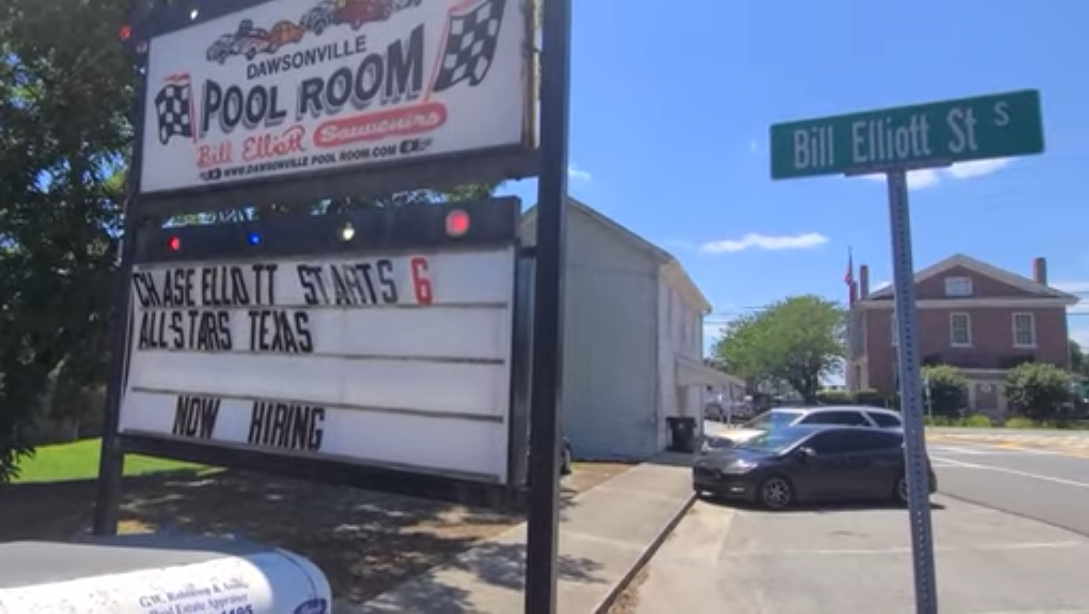
The Dawsonville Pool Room, located at the address of "9 Bill Elliott Street S" in Dawsonville, GA.

Elliott has been honored by the State of Georgia and the city of Dawsonville, Georgia in Dawson County with a number of roads renamed in honor of him and his family, as well as a date named in his honor.

- In 2005, the Georgia State Legislature declared October 8 (Elliott's birthday) as Bill Elliott Day in the state of Georgia.
- In downtown Dawsonville, East 1st Street N & S (North and South) was renamed "Bill Elliott Street N & S", which is also conveniently, where the famous Dawsonville Pool Room is located (at the address of "9 Bill Elliott Street S"), along with the infamous "siren" that traditionally went off when Bill Elliott won a race. Today, the tradition continues with Bill's son Chase, as the siren goes off every time Chase wins a race.
- Elliott was also honored by the state legislature with a stretch of roadway (the entirety of Georgia State Route 183) in his native Dawson County renamed "Elliott Family Parkway".

=== In media ===
In 1990, Konami released the first officially licensed NASCAR game, Bill Elliott's NASCAR Challenge for MS-DOS. The game was released for the NES and Amiga in 1991, and Bill Elliott's NASCAR Fast Tracks was released for the Game Boy at the same time.

== Motorsports career results ==
=== NASCAR ===
(key) (Bold – Pole position awarded by qualifying time. Italics – Pole position earned by points standings or practice time. * – Most laps led.)

==== Cup Series ====
NASCAR Cup Series results
Year	Team	No.	Make	1	2	3	4	5	6	7	8	9	10	11	12	13	14	15	16	17	18	19	20	21	22	23	24	25	26	27	28	29	30	31	32	33	34	35	36	NSCC	Pts	Ref
1975	Elliott Racing	9	Ford	RSD	DAY	RCH	CAR	BRI	ATL	NWS	DAR	MAR	TAL	NSV	DOV	CLT	RSD	MCH	DAY	NSV	POC	TAL	MCH	DAR	DOV	NWS	MAR	CLT	RCH	CAR	BRI	ATL; DNQ	ONT							NA	-	
1976	Elliott Racing	9	Ford	RSD	DAY	CAR; 33	RCH	BRI	ATL; 36	NWS	DAR	MAR	TAL; 38	NSV	DOV	CLT; 23	RSD																							41st	635	
1976	Champion Racing	10	Ford															MCH; 28	DAY; 19	NSV; 14	POC; 32	TAL	MCH	BRI	DAR	RCH	DOV	MAR	NWS	CLT	CAR	ATL	ONT							41st	635	
1977	Elliott Racing	9	Ford	RSD	DAY; DNQ	RCH	CAR; 30	ATL; 32	NWS	DAR	BRI	MAR	TAL	NSV	DOV	CLT; 15	RSD	MCH; 15	DAY; 35	NSV	POC																			35th	926	
1977	Elliott Racing	9	Mercury																			TAL; 23	MCH; 29	BRI						CLT; 10	CAR	ATL; 11	ONT							35th	926	
1977	Elliott Racing	52	Ford																						DAR; 10	RCH	DOV	MAR	NWS											35th	926	
1978	Elliott Racing	9	Mercury	RSD	DAY; 8	RCH	CAR	ATL; 38	BRI	DAR; 9	NWS	MAR	TAL; 6	DOV	CLT; 14	NSV	RSD	MCH	DAY; 9	NSV	POC	TAL; 13	MCH	BRI	DAR; 6	RCH	DOV	MAR	NWS	CLT; 17	CAR									33rd	1176	
1978	Elliott Racing	9	Olds																													ATL; 37	ONT							33rd	1176	
1979	Elliott Racing	9	Mercury	RSD	DAY; DNQ	CAR	RCH	ATL; 36	NWS	BRI	DAR; 7	MAR	TAL; 6	NSV	DOV	CLT; 38	TWS	RSD	MCH; 12	DAY; 11	NSV	POC	TAL; 12							CLT; 7	NWS									28th	1548	
1979	Elliott Racing	17	Mercury																					MCH; 11		DAR; 2														28th	1548	
1979	Hamby Racing	17	Chevy																						BRI; 10		RCH; 11	DOV	MAR			CAR; 23	ATL	ONT						28th	1548	
1980	Elliott Racing	9	Mercury	RSD	DAY; 12	RCH	CAR	ATL; 29	BRI	DAR	NWS	MAR	TAL; 21	NSV	DOV	CLT; 42	TWS	RSD	MCH; 9	DAY; 12	NSV	POC	TAL; 7	MCH; 9	BRI	DAR; 33	RCH	DOV	NWS	MAR	CLT; 6	CAR	ATL; 18	ONT						34th	1232	
1981	Elliott Racing	9	Ford	RSD	DAY; 6	RCH	CAR	ATL; 9	BRI	NWS	**DAR**; 4	MAR	TAL; 40	NSV	DOV	CLT; 40	TWS	RSD	MCH; 35	DAY; 34	NSV	POC	TAL; 11	MCH; 8	BRI	DAR; 7	RCH	DOV	MAR	NWS	CLT; 33	CAR; 8	ATL; 6	RSD						30th	1442	
1982	Melling Racing	9	Ford	DAY; 5	RCH; 12	BRI	ATL; 21	CAR; 23	DAR; 3	NWS	MAR	TAL; 26	NSV; 11	DOV	CLT; 2	POC; 19	RSD	MCH; 3	DAY; 2	NSV; 21	POC; 30	TAL; 6	**MCH**; 27	BRI	DAR; 4	RCH	DOV; 3	NWS	CLT; 2	MAR	CAR; 12	ATL; 24	RSD; 25							25th	2558	
1983	Melling Racing	9	Ford	DAY; 2	RCH; 6	CAR; 2	ATL; 30	DAR; 5	NWS; 21	MAR; 21	TAL; 5	NSV; 5	DOV; 4	BRI; 8	CLT; 16	RSD; 2	POC; 6	MCH; 25	DAY; 7	NSV; 7	POC; 6	TAL; 8	MCH; 3	BRI; 27	DAR; 2	RCH; 4	DOV; 8	MAR; 14	NWS; 4	CLT; 8	CAR; 21	ATL; 6	RSD; 1							3rd	4279	
1984	Melling Racing	9	Ford	DAY; 5	RCH; 4	CAR; 8	ATL; 11	BRI; 9	NWS; 10	DAR; 3	MAR; 7	TAL; 9	NSV; 20	DOV; 4	CLT; 28	RSD; 10	POC; 4	**MCH**; 1	DAY; 6	NSV; 7	POC; 3	TAL; 10	**MCH**; 3	BRI; 6	DAR; 15	RCH; 24	DOV; 32	MAR; 3	CLT; 1	NWS; 8	CAR; 1	**ATL**; 2	RSD; 4							3rd	4377	
1985	Melling Racing	9	Ford	**DAY**; 1*	RCH; 22	CAR; 29	ATL; 1*	BRI; 11	**DAR**; 1*	NWS; 6	MAR; 13	**TAL**; 1	DOV; 1*	**CLT**; 18	RSD; 6	**POC**; 1	**MCH**; 1	**DAY**; 2*	POC; 1	**TAL**; 4*	**MCH**; 1	BRI; 5	**DAR**; 1	RCH; 12	**DOV**; 20	MAR; 17	NWS; 30	CLT; 2	CAR; 4	**ATL**; 1*	RSD; 31									2nd	4191	
1986	Melling Racing	9	Ford	**DAY**; 13	RCH; 21	CAR; 7	ATL; 5	BRI; 5	DAR; 8	NWS; 9	MAR; 31	**TAL**; 24*	DOV; 7	CLT; 6*	RSD; 11	POC; 5	MCH; 1	DAY; 16	POC; 35	**TAL**; 27	GLN; 4	MCH; 1*	BRI; 19	DAR; 3	RCH; 9	DOV; 27	MAR; 11	NWS; 16	CLT; 7	CAR; 7	**ATL**; 3	RSD; 23								4th	3844	
1987	Melling Racing	9	Ford	**DAY**; 1*	CAR; 4	RCH; 4	ATL; 28	DAR; 2	**NWS**; 10	BRI; 4*	MAR; 6	**TAL**; 22	**CLT**; 23*	**DOV**; 2	POC; 2	RIV; 5	MCH; 34	DAY; 12	POC; 32	**TAL**; 1	GLN; 28	MCH; 1	BRI; 9	DAR; 8	RCH; 4	DOV; 4	MAR; 11	**NWS**; 3	CLT; 1	CAR; 1*	RSD; 23	**ATL**; 1*								2nd	4207	
1988	Melling Racing	9	Ford	DAY; 12	RCH; 12	**CAR**; 6	ATL; 19	DAR; 4	BRI; 1	NWS; 10	MAR; 11	TAL; 7	CLT; 19	DOV; 1*	RSD; 16	POC; 10	**MCH**; 2	DAY; 1	POC; 1*	TAL; 8	GLN; 3*	**MCH**; 3	BRI; 2	**DAR**; 1*	RCH; 7	DOV; 1*	MAR; 6	CLT; 4	**NWS**; 5	**CAR**; 4*	PHO; 4	ATL; 11								1st	4488	
1989	Melling Racing	9	Ford	DAY; 35	CAR; 19	ATL; 11	RCH; 10	DAR; 6	BRI; 9	NWS; 22	MAR; 20	TAL; 11	CLT; 5	DOV; 8	SON; 3	POC; 21	MCH; 1	DAY; 4*	POC; 1	TAL; 12	GLN; 18	MCH; 39	BRI; 24	DAR; 7	**RCH**; 18	DOV; 4	MAR; 15	CLT; 4*	NWS; 6	CAR; 15	PHO; 1	ATL; 27								6th	3774	
1990	Melling Racing	9	Ford	DAY; 3	RCH; 4	CAR; 33	ATL; 12	DAR; 7	BRI; 17	NWS; 18	MAR; 10	**TAL**; 22	CLT; 2	DOV; 8	SON; 21	POC; 16	MCH; 25*	DAY; 29	POC; 2	TAL; 2	GLN; 12	MCH; 4	BRI; 13	DAR; 4	RCH; 4	**DOV**; 1*	MAR; 8	NWS; 4	CLT; 15*	CAR; 2	PHO; 5	ATL; 15*								4th	3999	
1991	Melling Racing	9	Ford	DAY; 28	RCH; 30	CAR; 5	ATL; 2*	DAR; 12	BRI; 28	NWS; 8	MAR; 26	TAL; 8	CLT; 26	DOV; 13	SON; 20	POC; 36	MCH; 11	DAY; 1	POC; 9	TAL; 2	GLN; 7	MCH; 5	**BRI**; 21	DAR; 18	RCH; 9	DOV; 11	MAR; 27	NWS; 24	CLT; 11	CAR; 10	PHO; 25	**ATL**; 3								11th	3535	
1992	Junior Johnson & Associates	11	Ford	DAY; 27	CAR; 1*	**RCH**; 1*	ATL; 1	DAR; 1	BRI; 20	NWS; 20	MAR; 10	TAL; 2	**CLT**; 14	DOV; 13	SON; 5*	POC; 3	MCH; 10	DAY; 5	POC; 13	TAL; 5	GLN; 14	MCH; 3*	BRI; 6	DAR; 3	RCH; 14	DOV; 2*	MAR; 30	NWS; 26	CLT; 30	CAR; 4	PHO; 31	ATL; 1								2nd	4068	
1993	Junior Johnson & Associates	11	Ford	DAY; 39	CAR; 11	RCH; 33	ATL; 9	DAR; 14	BRI; 30	NWS; 10	MAR; 27	TAL; 22	SON; 17	CLT; 6	DOV; 17	POC; 10	MCH; 9	DAY; 20	NHA; 9	POC; 3	TAL; 11	GLN; 4	MCH; 10	BRI; 11	DAR; 18	RCH; 2	DOV; 10	MAR; 12	NWS; 18	CLT; 10	CAR; 3	**PHO**; 5	ATL; 4							8th	3774	
1994	Junior Johnson & Associates	11	Ford	DAY; 9	CAR; 39	RCH; 12	ATL; 32	**DAR**; 3	BRI; 30	NWS; 18	MAR; 9	TAL; 19	SON; 30	CLT; 22	DOV; 31	POC; 10	MCH; 11	DAY; 19	NHA; 16	POC; 17	TAL; 2	IND; 3	GLN; 12	MCH; 7	BRI; 5	DAR; 1	RCH; 15	DOV; 28	MAR; 3	NWS; 6	CLT; 33	CAR; 6	PHO; 35	ATL; 38						10th	3617	
1995	Elliott-Hardy Racing	94	Ford	DAY; 23	CAR; 11	RCH; 16	ATL; 26	DAR; 17	BRI; 14	NWS; 28	MAR; 12	TAL; 6	SON; 19	CLT; 39	DOV; 15	POC; 6	MCH; 14	DAY; 10	NHA; 18	**POC**; 5	TAL; 5	IND; 4*	GLN; 11	MCH; 9	BRI; 23	DAR; 41	RCH; 14	DOV; 18	MAR; 6	NWS; 10	CLT; 20	CAR; 10	**PHO**; 14	ATL; 4						8th	3746	
1996	Elliott-Hardy Racing	94	Ford	DAY; 8	CAR; 15	RCH; 10	ATL; 10	DAR; 13	BRI; 28	NWS; 21	MAR; 13	TAL; 41	SON	CLT	DOV	POC	MCH	DAY; 37	NHA; 14																					30th	2627	
1996	Bill Elliott Racing	94	Ford																	POC; 21	TAL; 13	IND; 10	GLN	MCH; 14	BRI; INQ^{†}	DAR; 9	RCH; 16	DOV; 28	MAR; 18	NWS; 21	CLT; 10	CAR; 32	PHO; 21	ATL; 20						30th	2627	
1997	Bill Elliott Racing	94	Ford	DAY; 4	CAR; 22	RCH; 15	ATL; 38	DAR; 16	TEX; 11	BRI; 7	MAR; 37	SON; 32	TAL; 18	CLT; 4	DOV; 8	POC; 32	MCH; 2	CAL; 32	DAY; 33	NHA; 6	POC; 10	IND; 8	GLN; 7	MCH; 7	BRI; 16	DAR; 4*	**RCH**; 30	NHA; 11	DOV; 8	MAR; 5	CLT; 7	TAL; 13	CAR; 12	PHO; 15	ATL; 36					8th	3836	
1998	Elliott-Marino Racing	94	Ford	DAY; 10	CAR; 6	LVS; 9	ATL; 11	DAR; 15	BRI; 15	TEX; 13	MAR; 12	TAL; 39	CAL; 43	CLT; 14	DOV; 13	RCH; 25	MCH; 6	POC; 37	SON; 12	NHA; 26	POC; 36	IND; 12	GLN; 27	MCH; 40	BRI; 19	NHA; 37	DAR; 11	RCH; 40	DOV	MAR; 7	CLT; 11	TAL; 19	DAY; 15	PHO; 38	CAR; 12	ATL; 26				18th	3305	
1999	Elliott-Marino Racing	94	Ford	DAY; 27																																				21st	3246	
1999	Bill Elliott Racing	94	Ford		CAR; 15	LVS; 37	ATL; 15	DAR; 14	TEX; 21	BRI; 25	MAR; 30	TAL; 10	CAL; 19	RCH; 12	CLT; 14	DOV; 12	MCH; 41	POC; 32	SON; 13	DAY; 23	NHA; 5	POC; 39	IND; 23	GLN; 28	MCH; 19	BRI; 36	DAR; 11	RCH; 36	NHA; 19	DOV; 33	MAR; 20	CLT; 11	TAL; 20	CAR; 33	PHO; 35	HOM; 24	ATL; 22			21st	3246	
2000	Bill Elliott Racing	94	Ford	DAY; 3	CAR; 25	LVS; 4	ATL; 10	DAR; 19	BRI; 36	TEX; 30	MAR; 8	TAL; 15	CAL; 19	RCH; 9	CLT; 43	DOV; 12	MCH; 8	POC; 38	SON; 35	DAY; 38	NHA; 24	POC; 32	IND; 3	GLN; 13	MCH; 38	BRI	DAR	RCH; 12	NHA; 37	DOV; 19	MAR; 15	CLT; 34	TAL; 24	CAR; 16	PHO; 26	HOM; 22	ATL; 11			21st	3267	
2001	Evernham Motorsports	9	Dodge	**DAY**; 5	CAR; 23	LVS; 14	ATL; 16	DAR; 23	BRI; 17	TEX; 14	MAR; 14	TAL; 32	CAL; 14	RCH; 37	CLT; 26	DOV; 40	MCH; 9	POC; 27	SON; 9	DAY; 35	CHI; 10	NHA; 21	POC; 4	IND; 8	GLN; 24	MCH; 3*	BRI; 19	DAR; 5	RCH; 17	DOV; 30	KAN; 40	CLT; 15	MAR; 42	TAL; 20	PHO; 27	CAR; 40	**HOM**; 1	ATL; 14	NHA; 22	15th	3824	
2002	Evernham Motorsports	9	Dodge	DAY; 11	CAR; 11	LVS; 8	**ATL**; 35	DAR; 10	BRI; 21	**TEX**; 9	MAR; 31	TAL; 19	CAL; 4	RCH; 14	CLT; 9	DOV; 2	POC; 30	MCH; 11	SON; 8	DAY; 17	CHI; 7	**NHA**; 34	**POC**; 1	IND; 1*	GLN; 21	MCH; 22	BRI; 17	DAR; 3	RCH; 16	NHA; 23	DOV; 18	KAN; 5	TAL; 19	CLT; 35	MAR; 42	ATL; 33	CAR; 39	PHO; 30	HOM; 7	13th	4158	
2003	Evernham Motorsports	9	Dodge	DAY; 32	CAR; 32	LVS; 14	ATL; 39	DAR; 9	BRI; 18	TEX; 43	TAL; 13	MAR; 13	CAL; 4	RCH; 20	CLT; 26	DOV; 22	POC; 19	MCH; 24	SON; 4	DAY; 16	CHI; 11	NHA; 31	POC; 17	IND; 5	GLN; 20	MCH; 15	BRI; 16	DAR; 5	RCH; 37	NHA; 4	DOV; 14	TAL; 13	KAN; 2*	CLT; 4	MAR; 9	ATL; 4	PHO; 14	CAR; 1*	HOM; 8*	9th	4303	
2004	Evernham Motorsports	91	Dodge	DAY	CAR	LVS; 20	ATL	DAR	BRI	TEX; 36	MAR	TAL	CAL	RCH	CLT	DOV	POC	MCH	SON					IND; 9	GLN	MCH	BRI													48th	595	
2004	Bill Elliott Racing	98	Dodge																	DAY; 18	CHI	NHA	POC					CAL; 25	RCH	NHA	DOV	TAL	KAN	CLT	MAR	ATL; 22	PHO	DAR	HOM	48th	595	
2005	Evernham Motorsports	91	Dodge	DAY	CAL; 43	LVS	ATL; 22	BRI	MAR	TEX; 33	PHO	TAL	DAR	RCH	CLT; 20	DOV	POC	MCH; 35	SON	DAY	CHI	NHA	POC	IND; 23	GLN	MCH; 11	BRI	CAL; 40	RCH	NHA	DOV	TAL	KAN	CLT	MAR	ATL	TEX; 32	PHO	HOM	45th	695	
2006	MB2 Motorsports	36	Chevy	DAY; 19	CAL	LVS	ATL	BRI	MAR	TEX	PHO	TAL	RCH	DAR	CLT	DOV	POC	MCH	SON	DAY																				44th	765	
2006	Michael Waltrip Racing	00	Chevy																		CHI; 35	NHA; 32	POC	IND; 22				CAL; 42	RCH	NHA	DOV								HOM; 25	44th	765	
2006	Evernham Motorsports	19	Dodge																						GLN; 27	MCH	BRI													44th	765	
2006	R&J Racing	37	Dodge																													KAN; 16	TAL			ATL; 41	TEX; DNQ	PHO; 31		44th	765	
2006	Team Red Bull	83	Dodge																															CLT; DNQ	MAR					44th	765	
2007	Front Row Motorsports	37	Dodge	DAY; DNQ	CAL	LVS	ATL	BRI	MAR	TEX	PHO	TAL	RCH	DAR																										42nd	1579	
2007	Wood Brothers Racing	21	Ford												CLT; 38	DOV; 35	POC; 37	MCH; 11	SON; 19	NHA; 34	DAY; 24	CHI; 28	IND; 23	POC; 18	GLN; QL^{‡}	MCH; 35	BRI; 25	CAL; 26	RCH; 29	NHA	DOV	KAN	TAL	CLT; 35	MAR; 34	ATL; 18	TEX; 36	PHO; 34	HOM; 28	42nd	1579	
2008	Wood Brothers Racing	21	Ford	DAY; DNQ	CAL; 26	LVS	ATL; DNQ	BRI	MAR; 34	TEX; 34	PHO; 31	TAL	RCH	DAR; 30	CLT	DOV; 33	POC; 31	MCH; 36	SON	NHA	DAY	CHI; 35	IND; DNQ	POC; 20	GLN	MCH	BRI; 26	CAL	RCH; 35	NHA; 29	DOV	KAN; 25	TAL	CLT; 28	MAR; 16	ATL; 38	TEX; 31	PHO; 29	HOM; 12	39th	1528	
2009	Wood Brothers Racing	21	Ford	DAY; 23	CAL	LVS	ATL; 36	BRI	MAR	TEX; 28	PHO	TAL	RCH	DAR	CLT; 15	DOV	POC	MCH; 16	SON	NHA	DAY	CHI; 29	IND; 26	POC	GLN	MCH; 16	BRI	ATL	RCH	NHA	DOV	KAN; 19	CAL	CLT; 29	MAR	TAL	TEX; 34	PHO	HOM; 16	42nd	1095	
2010	Wood Brothers Racing	21	Ford	DAY; 27	CAL	LVS	ATL; 16	BRI	MAR	PHO	TEX; 25	TAL	RCH	DAR	DOV	CLT; 27	POC	MCH; 29	SON	NHA	DAY	CHI; 37	IND; 18	POC	GLN	MCH; 22	BRI	ATL; 23	RCH	NHA	DOV	KAN; 25	CAL	CLT; 35	MAR				HOM; 15	41st	1107	
2010	Latitude 43 Motorsports	26	Ford																																	TAL; 40	TEX	PHO		41st	1107	
2011	Phoenix Racing	09	Chevy	DAY; 12	PHO; 23	LVS; 30	BRI; 29	CAL	MAR	TEX																														40th	100	
2011	Whitney Motorsports	46	Chevy								TAL; 26	RCH	DAR	DOV	CLT	KAN	POC	MCH	SON	DAY	KEN	NHA	IND	POC	GLN	MCH	BRI	ATL	RCH	CHI	NHA	DOV	KAN	CLT	TAL	MAR	TEX	PHO	HOM	40th	100	
2012	NEMCO Motorsports	97	Toyota	DAY; DNQ	PHO	LVS	BRI	CAL	MAR	TEX	KAN	RCH	TAL; 37	DAR	CLT	DOV	POC	MCH	SON	KEN																				49th	14	
2012	Turner Motorsports	50	Chevy																		DAY; 37	NHA	IND	POC	GLN	MCH	BRI	ATL	RCH	CHI	NHA	DOV	TAL	CLT	KAN	MAR	TEX	PHO	HOM	49th	14	
^{†} – Qualified but replaced by Bobby Hillin Jr. ^{‡} – Qualified but replaced by Boris Said

===== Daytona 500 =====
Year	Team	Manufacturer	Start	Finish
1977	Elliott Racing	Ford	DNQ	
1978	Elliott Racing	Mercury	9	8
1979	Elliott Racing	Mercury	DNQ	
1980	Elliott Racing	Mercury	24	12
1981	Elliott Racing	Mercury	16	6
1982	Melling Racing	Ford	20	5
1983	Melling Racing	Ford	17	2
1984	Melling Racing	Ford	3	5
1985	Melling Racing	Ford	**1**	**1**
1986	Melling Racing	Ford	**1**	13
1987	Melling Racing	Ford	**1**	**1**
1988	Melling Racing	Ford	31	12
1989	Melling Racing	Ford	13	35
1990	Melling Racing	Ford	4	3
1991	Melling Racing	Ford	15	28
1992	Junior Johnson & Associates	Ford	2	27
1993	Junior Johnson & Associates	Ford	5	39
1994	Junior Johnson & Associates	Ford	8	9
1995	Elliott-Hardy Racing	Ford	10	23
1996	Elliott-Hardy Racing	Ford	21	8
1997	Bill Elliott Racing	Ford	8	4
1998	Elliott-Marino Racing	Ford	19	10
1999	Elliott-Marino Racing	Ford	37	27
2000	Bill Elliott Racing	Ford	3	3
2001	Evernham Motorsports	Dodge	**1**	5
2002	Evernham Motorsports	Dodge	29	11
2003	Evernham Motorsports	Dodge	14	32
2006	MB2 Motorsports	Chevrolet	33	19
2007	Front Row Motorsports	Dodge	DNQ	
2008	Wood Brothers Racing	Ford	DNQ	
2009	Wood Brothers Racing	Ford	40	23
2010	Wood Brothers Racing	Ford	40	27
2011	Phoenix Racing	Chevrolet	29	12
2012	NEMCO Motorsports	Toyota	DNQ	

==== Xfinity Series ====
NASCAR Xfinity Series results
Year	Team	No.	Make	1	2	3	4	5	6	7	8	9	10	11	12	13	14	15	16	17	18	19	20	21	22	23	24	25	26	27	28	29	30	31	32	33	34	35	NXSC	Pts	Ref
1983	Darrell Waltrip Motorsports	17	Pontiac	DAY	RCH	CAR	HCY	MAR	NWS	SBO	GPS	LGY	DOV	BRI	CLT; 3	SBO	HCY	ROU	SBO	ROU	CRW	ROU	SBO	HCY	LGY	IRP	GPS	BRI	HCY	DAR	RCH	NWS	SBO	MAR	ROU	CLT	HCY	MAR	100th	165	
1984	Bill Elliott Racing	84	Pontiac	DAY	RCH	CAR	HCY	MAR	DAR	ROU	NSV	LGY	MLW	DOV	CLT	SBO	HCY	ROU	SBO	ROU	HCY	IRP	LGY	SBO	BRI	DAR	RCH	NWS	CLT; 9	HCY	CAR	MAR							106th	0	
1986	Bill Elliott Racing	9	Buick	DAY	CAR	HCY	MAR	BRI	DAR	SBO	LGY	JFC	DOV	CLT	SBO	HCY	ROU	IRP	SBO	RAL; 11	OXF	SBO	HCY	LGY	ROU	BRI	DAR	RCH	DOV	MAR	ROU								96th	43	
1986	Baker-Schiff Racing	88	Buick																													CLT; 40	CAR	MAR					96th	43	
1987	Bill Elliott Racing	89	Ford	DAY; 24	HCY	MAR	DAR	BRI	LGY	SBO	CLT; 10	DOV	IRP; 15	ROU	JFC	OXF	SBO	HCY	RAL	LGY	ROU	BRI	JFC																39th	614	
1987	Bill Elliott Racing	9	Buick																					DAR; 19	RCH	DOV	MAR	CLT; 3	CAR	MAR									39th	614	
1988	Bill Elliott Racing	9	Ford	DAY	HCY	CAR	MAR	DAR	BRI	LNG	NZH	SBO	NSV	CLT; 7	DOV	ROU	LAN	LVL	MYB	OXF	SBO	HCY	LNG	IRP	ROU	BRI	DAR	RCH	DOV	MAR	CLT; 23	CAR	MAR						61st	240	
1991	Bill Elliott Racing	84	Ford	DAY	RCH	CAR	MAR	VOL	HCY	DAR	BRI	LAN	SBO	NZH	CLT	DOV	ROU	HCY	MYB	GLN	OXF	NHA	SBO	DUB	IRP	ROU	BRI	DAR	RCH	DOV	CLT; 10	NHA	CAR; 9	MAR					70th	272	
1992	Charles Hardy Racing	11	Ford	DAY; 11	CAR; 30	RCH	ATL; 11	MAR	DAR	BRI	HCY	LAN	DUB	NZH	CLT; 13	DOV; 4	ROU	MYB	GLN; 23	VOL	NHA	TAL; 31	IRP; 14	ROU	MCH; 4	NHA	BRI	DAR; 34	RCH	DOV; 7	CLT	MAR	CAR; 36	HCY					34th	1203	
1993	Charles Hardy Racing	11	Ford	DAY; 29	CAR	RCH	DAR; 10	BRI	HCY	ROU	MAR	NZH	CLT; 18	DOV	MYB	GLN; 1^{*}	MLW	**TAL**; 5	IRP	**MCH**; 34	NHA; 15	BRI	DAR; 38	RCH; 5	DOV	ROU	CLT; 4	MAR	CAR	HCY	ATL; 28								29th	1276	
1994	Charles Hardy Racing	11	Ford	DAY; 19	CAR	RCH	ATL	MAR	DAR	HCY	BRI	ROU	NHA	NZH	CLT	DOV	MYB	GLN	MLW	SBO	TAL	HCY	IRP	MCH	BRI	DAR	RCH	DOV	CLT	MAR	CAR								81st	106	
2004	Tommy Baldwin Racing	6	Dodge	DAY	CAR	LVS	DAR	BRI	TEX	NSH	TAL	CAL	GTY	RCH	NZH	CLT	DOV	NSH	KEN	MLW	DAY	CHI	NHA	PPR	IRP	MCH	BRI	CAL	RCH	DOV	KAN	CLT	MEM; 20	ATL	PHO	DAR	HOM		119th	103	
2005	Rusty Wallace, Inc.	64	Dodge	DAY	CAL	MXC	LVS	ATL	NSH	BRI	TEX	PHO	TAL	DAR	RCH	CLT	DOV	NSH; 23	KEN	MLW; 17	DAY	CHI	NHA	PPR; 6	GTY	IRP	GLN												59th	674	
2005	Evernham Motorsports	6	Dodge																									MCH; 24	BRI	CAL	RCH	DOV	KAN	CLT; 17	MEM; 16	TEX	PHO	HOM	59th	674	
2007	Braun Racing	32	Toyota	DAY	CAL	MXC	LVS	ATL	BRI	NSH	TEX	PHO	TAL	RCH	DAR	CLT; DNQ	DOV	NSH	KEN	MLW	NHA	DAY	CHI	GTY	IRP	CGV	GLN	MCH	BRI	CAL	RCH	DOV	KAN	CLT	MEM	TEX	PHO	HOM	N/A	-	
2018	GMS Racing	23	Chevy	DAY	ATL	LVS	PHO	CAL	TEX	BRI	RCH	TAL	DOV	CLT	POC	MCH	IOW	CHI	DAY	KEN	NHA	IOW	GLN	MOH	BRI	ROA; 20	DAR	IND	LVS	RCH	CLT	DOV	KAN	TEX	PHO	HOM			64th	17	

==== Craftsman Truck Series ====
NASCAR Craftsman Truck Series results
Year	Team	No.	Make	1	2	3	4	5	6	7	8	9	10	11	12	13	14	15	16	17	18	19	20	21	22	23	24	25	26	NCTC	Pts	Ref
1996	Ultra Motorsports	4	Ford	HOM	PHO	POR	EVG	TUS	CNS	HPT	BRI	NZH	MLW	LVL	I70	IRP	FLM	GLN	NSV	RCH	NHA	MAR	NWS	SON	MMR	PHO	LVS; 2			80th	170	
1997	Bill Elliott Racing	94	Ford	WDW	TUS	HOM	PHO	POR	EVG	I70	NHA	TEX	BRI	NZH	MLW	LVL	CNS	HPT	IRP	FLM	NSV	GLN	RCH	MAR	SON	MMR	CAL	PHO	LVS; 31	126th	70	

==== Winston West Series ====
NASCAR Winston West Series results
Year	Team	No.	Make	1	2	3	4	5	6	7	8	9	10	11	12	13	14	NWWSC	Pts	Ref
1985	Melling Racing	9	Ford	SON	SHA	RSD	MMR	SIR	POR	STA	YAK	EVG; 25	WSR	MMR	RSD			52nd	26	
1986	Melling Racing	9	Ford	SON	RSD	**EVG**; 2*	RCS	TAC	PIR	WSR	RSD							34th	54	
1987	Melling Racing	9	Ford	SON	RSD	SGP	**EVG**; 1*	POR	TAC	MMR	RSD							32nd	60	
1988	Melling Racing	9	Ford	SON	MMR	RSD	SGP	POR	EVG; 29	MMR	PHO							44th	22	
1989	Melling Racing	9	Ford	MAD	MMR	RAS	SON	POR	TCR	**EVG**; 25	MMR	SGS	SON	PHO				47th	93	
1990	Melling Racing	9	Ford	MMR	SON	SGS	POR	**EVG**; 2	RAS	TCR	MMR	PHO						32nd	175	
1991	Melling Racing	9	Ford	EVG	MMR	SON	SGS	POR	EVG; 12	SSS	MMR	PHO						48th	127	
1992	Junior Johnson & Associates	11	Ford	MMR	SGS	SON	SHA	POR	EVG; 8	SSS	CAJ	TWS	MMR	PHO				39th	142	
1997	Bill Elliott Racing	94	Ford	TUS	AMP	SON	TUS	MMR	LVS	CAL	EVG	POR	PPR	AMP	SON	MMR	LVS; 34	79th	61	

^{*} Season still in progress
^{1} Ineligible for series points

=== International Race of Champions ===
(key) (Bold – Pole position. * – Most laps led.)

International Race of Champions results
Year	Make	1	2	3	4	Pos.	Pts	Ref
1986	Chevy	DAY; 3	MOH; 4	TAL; 3	GLN; 2	2nd	59	
1987	Chevy	DAY; 4	MOH; 7	MCH; 10	GLN; 5	6th	38	
1988	Chevy	**DAY**; 1*	RSD; 10	MCH; 7	GLN; 8	4th	46	
1989	Chevy	DAY; 5	NZH; 11	MCH; 4	GLN; 4	6th	38	
1991	Dodge	DAY; 2	TAL; 2	MCH; 2	GLN; 5	2nd	64	
1993	Dodge	DAY; 1	DAR; 10	TAL; 12	MCH; 2	3rd	50	

=== Superstar Racing Experience ===
(key) * – Most laps led. ^{1} – Heat 1 winner. ^{2} – Heat 2 winner.

Superstar Racing Experience results
Year	No.	1	2	3	4	5	6	SRXC	Pts
2021	9	STA; 12	KNX; 11	ELD; 12	IRP; 12	SLG; 9	NSV; 3^{1}	9th	105
2022	9	FIF; 9	SBO	STA; 11	NSV	I55	SHA	15th	31

^{*} Season still in progress

Sporting positions
Preceded by Dale Earnhardt	NASCAR Winston Cup Champion; 1988	Succeeded by Rusty Wallace
Achievements
Preceded by Darrell Waltrip	The Winston Winner; 1986	Succeeded by Dale Earnhardt
Preceded by Jeff Gordon	Brickyard 400 Winner; 2002	Succeeded by Kevin Harvick
Preceded by Cale Yarborough; Geoff Bodine	Daytona 500 Winner; 1985; 1987	Succeeded by Geoff Bodine; Bobby Allison
Awards
Preceded by Bobby Allison; Darrell Waltrip; Dale Earnhardt	NASCAR Cup Series Most Popular Driver; 1984-1988; 1991-2000; 2002	Succeeded by Darrell Waltrip; Dale Earnhardt; Dale Earnhardt Jr.
