= Georgia Racing Hall of Fame =

Georgia racecar museum

Coordinates: 34.4183°N 84.1124°W

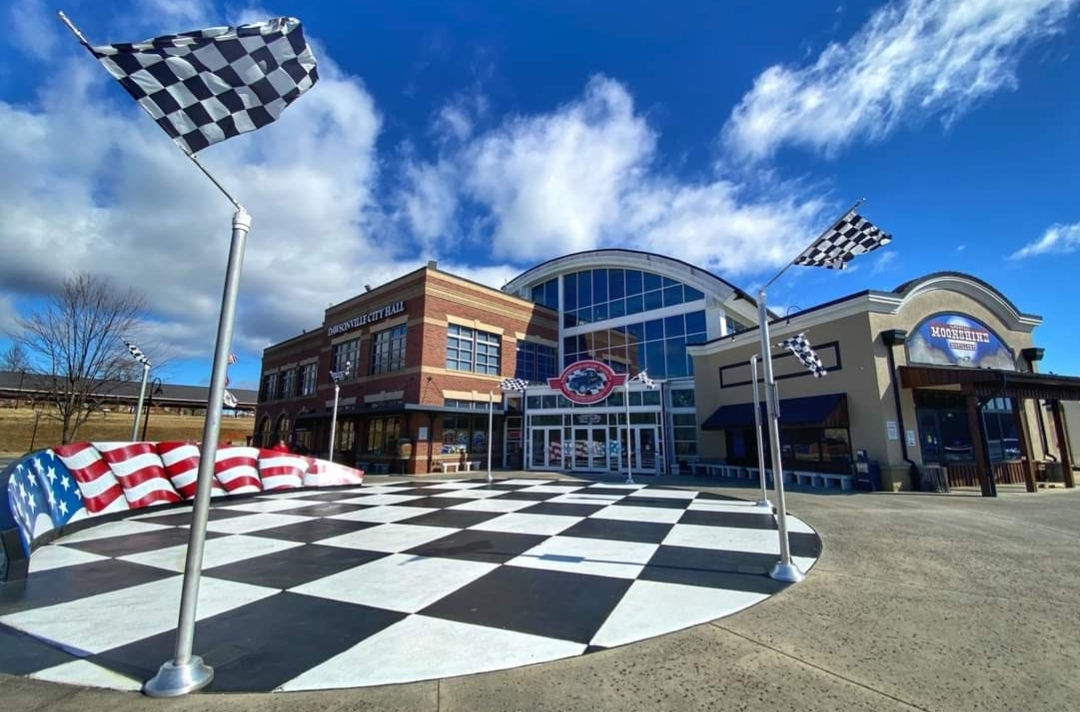
- Established: 2002; 24 years ago
- Location: Dawsonville, Georgia
- Type: Professional sports hall of fame
- Website: georgiaracinghof.com/museum-tour/

The Georgia Racing Hall of Fame is an American museum located in Dawsonville, Georgia. Established in 2002, the museum serves to preserve the auto racing achievements of notable racecar drivers from Georgia.

The museum holds numerous artifacts, including a 1948 car driven by Red Byron and the Ford racecar driven by Gober Sosebee in the Daytona 500 (depicted in logo).

== History ==
The museum was founded in 2002 by local businessman Gordon Pirkle. Exhibits and artifacts for the museum were collected by Pirkle or donated by racers and collectors within the State of Georgia.

The museum serves as a cultural staple of the City of Dawsonville, which has historical ties to auto racing that date back to the 1930s during the Prohibition Era. The town is commonly cited as "the birthplace of stock car racing". Multiple inductees of the museum are native to Dawsonville, including Bill and Chase Elliott.

== Inductees ==
As of 2024, the museum has 130 inductees, all of whom have either previously been a racecar driver, contributed to the sport, or contributed to the museum itself.

Originally, the museum would select eight individuals each year to induct. Beginning in 2010, this number was reduced to five.
