= 1985 Southern 500 =

Auto race held at Darlington Raceway in 1985

Race details
- Race 20 of 28 in the 1985 NASCAR Winston Cup Series season
- 1985 Southern 500 program cover
- Date: September 1, 1985
- Official name: Southern 500
- Location: Darlington Raceway, Darlington, South Carolina
- Course: Permanent racing facility
- Course length: 1.366 miles (2.198 km)
- Distance: 367 laps, 501.322 mi (806.500 km)
- Weather: Temperatures of 84 °F (29 °C); wind speeds of 5.87 miles per hour (9.45 km/h)
- Average speed: 121.254 mph (195.139 km/h); 4 hours, 8 minutes, 02 seconds
- Attendance: 80,000

Pole position
Driver	Bill Elliott 31.3941 seconds 156.641 mph (252.089 km/h)	Melling Racing

Most laps led
Driver	Dale Earnhardt	Richard Childress Racing
- Laps: 147

Winner
No. 9	Bill Elliott	Melling Racing

Television in the United States
- Network: ESPN
- Announcers: Lap-by-lap: Larry Nuber; Pit Reporter: Jack Arute

Radio in the United States
- Radio: MRN
- Booth announcers: Barney Hall, Mike Joy
- Turn announcers: Turns 1 and 2: Eli Gold; Turns 3 and 4: Mark Garrow

The 1985 Southern 500 was a NASCAR Winston Cup Series race that took place on September 1, 1985, at Darlington Raceway in Darlington, South Carolina. It was race number 20 of 28 of the 1985 NASCAR Winston Cup Series season. Bill Elliott made history by winning the race and with it the Winston Million bonus; it was then the richest single race payday in motorsports history.

== Background ==
Darlington Raceway, nicknamed by many NASCAR fans and drivers as "The Lady in Black" or "The Track Too Tough to Tame", is a race track built for NASCAR racing located near Darlington, South Carolina. It is of a unique, somewhat egg-shaped design, an oval with the ends of very different configurations, altered to accommodate the resident landowner who didn’t want his nearby minnow pond disturbed. This situation makes it very challenging for the crews to set up their cars' handling in a way that will be effective at both ends.

The track is a four-turn 1.366 miles (2.198 km) oval. The track's first two turns are banked at twenty-five degrees, while the final two turns are banked two degrees lower at twenty-three degrees. The front stretch (the location of the finish line) and the back stretch is banked at six degrees. Darlington Raceway can seat up to 60,000 people.

Layout of Darlington Raceway, the track where the race was held.

Darlington has something of a legendary quality among drivers and older fans; this is probably due to its long track length relative to other NASCAR speedways of its era and hence the first venue where many of them became cognizant of the truly high speeds that stock cars could achieve on a long track. The track allegedly earned the moniker The Lady in Black because the night before the race the track maintenance crew would cover the entire track with fresh asphalt sealant, in the early years of the speedway, thus making the racing surface dark black. Darlington is also known as "The Track Too Tough to Tame" because drivers can run lap after lap without a problem and then bounce off of the wall the following lap. Racers will frequently explain that they have to race the racetrack, not their competition. Drivers hitting the wall are considered to have received their "Darlington Stripe" thanks to the missing paint on the right side of the car.

== Race summary ==
Dale Earnhardt had the dominant car of the race but on lap 317 he spun which not only brought out the caution flag but also damaged his engine which led to him dropping out of the race. Cale Yarborough led until his car started billowing smoke from his power steering leading to one of the race's last caution flags leaving Bill Elliott in the lead and claiming the Winston Million.

This race was the first start for Pancho Carter and the last Cup race for NASCAR Busch Series legend Tommy Houston.

== Full results ==
=== Failed to qualify ===
Failed to qualify, withdrew, or driver changes:

Driver	Car no.	Car Make
Jonathan Lee Edwards		
Ferrel Harris		
Rick Newsom		
Connie Saylor		
Bobby Wawak		
J.D. McDuffie	70	Chevrolet Monte Carlo

=== Box score ===
Fin.	Grid	Car no.	Driver	Car Make	Status	Laps	Laps Led	Points
1	1	9	Bill Elliott	Ford Thunderbird	4:08:02	367	100	180 (5)
2	22	28	Cale Yarborough	Ford Thunderbird	-.6 seconds	367	25	175 (5)
3	17	5	Geoffrey Bodine	Chevrolet Monte Carlo	Running	367	5	170 (5)
4	21	12	Neil Bonnett	Chevrolet Monte Carlo	-1 lap	366	0	160
5	19	47	Ron Bouchard	Buick Regal	-1 lap	366	1	160 (5)
6	11	15	Ricky Rudd	Ford Thunderbird	-1 lap	366	0	150
7	9	44	Terry Labonte	Oldsmobile Cutlass Supreme	-2 laps	365	0	146
8	3	55	Benny Parsons	Chevrolet Monte Carlo	-2 laps	365	0	142
9	4	4	Joe Ruttman	Chevrolet Monte Carlo	-3 laps	364	0	138
10	25	7	Kyle Petty	Ford Thunderbird	-3 laps	364	0	134
11	8	27	Tim Richmond	Pontiac Grand Prix	-3 laps	364	0	130
12	24	43	Richard Petty	Pontiac Grand Prix	-3 laps	364	0	127
13	20	8	Bobby Hillin Jr.	Chevrolet Monte Carlo	-5 laps	362	1	129 (5)
14	32	90	Ken Schrader	Ford Thunderbird	-5 laps	362	0	121
15	16	88	Buddy Baker	Oldsmobile	Engine	358	2	123 (5)
16	18	75	Lake Speed	Pontiac Grand Prix	-9 laps	358	0	115
17	7	11	Darrell Waltrip	Chevrolet Monte Carlo	-12 laps	355	0	112
18	33	67	Buddy Arrington	Ford Thunderbird	-14 laps	353	0	109
19	5	3	Dale Earnhardt	Chevrolet Monte Carlo	Engine	349	147	116 (10)
20	39	17	Ken Ragan	Chevrolet Monte Carlo	-18 laps	349	0	103
21	6	33	Harry Gant	Chevrolet Monte Carlo	Engine	336	84	105 (5)
22	29	1	Pancho Carter	Chevrolet Monte Carlo	-31 laps	336	0	97
23	27	71	Dave Marcis	Chevrolet Monte Carlo	Vibration	271	2	99 (5)
24	35	23	Michael Waltrip	Chevrolet Monte Carlo	Engine	266	0	91
25	26	14	A.J. Foyt	Oldsmobile	Brakes	248	0	88
26	37	64	Clark Dwyer	Ford Thunderbird	Crash	237	0	85
27	36	52	Jimmy Means	Chevrolet Monte Carlo	Camshaft	236	0	82
28	40	68	Mike Potter	Ford Thunderbird	Engine	186	0	79
29	38	51	Slick Johnson	Ford Thunderbird	Oil pressure	184	0	76
30	23	22	Bobby Allison	Ford Thunderbird	Engine	162	0	73
31	30	49	Trevor Boys	Chevrolet Monte Carlo	Crash	134	0	70
32	34	6	Eddie Bierschwale	Chevrolet Monte Carlo	Engine	108	0	67
33	12	18	Tommy Ellis	Chevrolet Monte Carlo	Transmission	101	0	64
34	31	36	H.B. Bailey	Pontiac Grand Prix	Crash	94	0	61
35	10	77	Greg Sacks	Buick Regal	Crash	60	0	58
36	28	32	Tommy Houston	Chevrolet Monte Carlo	Engine	47	0	55
37	15	16	Morgan Shepherd	Chevrolet Monte Carlo	Engine	22	0	52
38	14	2	Rusty Wallace	Pontiac Grand Prix	Crash	21	0	49
39	13	66	Phil Parsons	Chevrolet Monte Carlo	Crash	21	0	46
40	2	21	David Pearson	Ford Thunderbird	Engine	17	0	43

(5) Indicates 5 bonus points added to normal race points scored for leading 1 lap
(10) Indicates 10 bonus points added to normal race points scored for leading 1 lap & leading the most laps

=== Cautions ===
Cautions: 14 for 70 laps

From Lap	To Lap	Total laps	Reason
23	30	8	Car #'s 2 (Wallace) & 66 (P.Parsons), accident turn 4
36	39	4	Rain
61	64	4	Debris
100	107	8	Car # 36 (Bailey), accident turn 2
148	154	7	Car # 49 (Boys), accident
169	173	5	Oil on track
189	193	5	Car # 51 (Johnson), Accident
267	271	5	Car # 64 (Dwyer), accident frontstretch
294	297	4	Debris, backstretch
318	322	5	Car # 3 (Earnhardt), spun turn 4
325	329	5	Car # 28 (Yarborough) smoking
333	334	2	Debris
338	341	4	Oil on track
351	354	4	Debris

=== Lap leaders ===
Driver	From Lap	To Lap	Total Laps
Bill Elliott	1	14	14
Dale Earnhardt	15	23	9
Buddy Baker	24	24	1
Dave Marcis	25	26	2
Geoffrey Bodine	27	31	5
Dale Earnhardt	32	61	30
Bobby Hillin, Jr.	62	62	1
Bill Elliott	63	100	38
Harry Gant	101	115	15
Dale Earnhardt	116	148	33
Ron Bouchard	149	149	1
Dale Earnhardt	150	155	6
Harry Gant	156	169	14
Buddy Baker	170	170	1
Harry Gant	171	190	20
Dale Earnhardt	191	259	69
Harry Gant	260	294	35
Cale Yarborough	295	318	24
Bill Elliott	319	322	4
Cale Yarborough	323	323	1
Bill Elliott	324	367	44

== Standings after the race ==
Pos	Driver	Points	Difference
1	Bill Elliott	3176	0
2	Darrell Waltrip	2970	-206
3	Neil Bonnett	2880	-296
4	Harry Gant	2760	-416
5	Geoffrey Bodine	2742	-434
6	Kyle Petty	2699	-477
7	Ricky Rudd	2698	-478
8	Terry Labonte	2634	-542
9	Bobby Allison	2497	-679
10	Lake Speed	2494	-682

Preceded by 1985 Busch 500	NASCAR Winston Cup Series Season; 1985	Succeeded by 1985 Wrangler Sanfor-Set 400

Preceded by 1984	Southern 500 races 1985	Succeeded by 1986
