= Elliott Racing =

Former NASCAR team

- Owner: George Elliott
- Base: Dawsonville, Georgia
- Series: Winston Cup
- Race drivers: Bill Elliott; David Hobbs; Al Holbert
- Manufacturer: Ford, Mercury, Oldsmobile
- Opened: 1966
- Closed: 1981

Career
- Debut: 1966 American 500 (North Carolina Speedway)
- Latest race: 1981 Atlanta Journal 500 (Atlanta Motor Speedway)
- Races competed: 68
- Drivers' Championships: 0
- Race victories: 0
- Pole positions: 1

Elliott Racing is a former NASCAR Winston Cup Series race team owned by George Elliott, father of Bill Elliott. The team was founded in 1966, and the organization was closed after Harry Melling bought the team from George Elliott.

== History ==
=== Primary Car History ===
The primary car for Elliott Racing was the No. 9 car. The No. 9 began in 1976 with driver Bill Elliott, car owner George Elliott and crew chief Ernie Elliott (Bill's brother).

In 1976 Elliott Racing ran six races, with Bill Elliott driving four races (California 500, Atlanta 500, Winston 500 and World 600), David Hobbs ran the Champion Spark Plug 400 and Al Holbert ran the National 500.

In 1977 Elliott Racing ran eleven races (ten races in the No. 9 and one race in the No. 52). Bill Elliott ran all 11 races, 10 in the No. 9 (Daytona 500, California 500, Atlanta 500, World 600, Cam 2 Motor Oil 400, Firecracker 400, Talledaga 500, Champion Spark Plug 400, NAPA National 500 and Dixie 500), Elliott also ran the Southern 500 in the No. 52

In 1978 Elliott Racing ran ten races, with Bill Elliott driving all ten races (Daytona 500, Atlanta 500, Rebel 500, Winston 500, World 600, Firecracker 400, Talladega 500, Southern 500, NAPA National 500 and Dixie 500)

In 1979 Elliott Racing attempted 11 races (nine races in the No. 9 and two races in the No. 17). Bill Elliott drove 14 races, nine in the No. 9 (Daytona 500, Atlanta 500, CRC Chemicals Rebel 500, Winston 500, World 600, Gabriel 400, Firecracker 400, Talladega 500, and NAPA National 500), and two races in the No. 17 as an alliance between Elliott Racing and Hamby Racing (Elliott ran three races with Hamby Racing, also in the No. 17).

In 1980 Elliott Racing ran eleven races. Bill Elliott ran all eleven races (Daytona 500, Atlanta 500, Winston 500, World 600, Gabriel 400, Firecracker 400, Talladega 500, Champion Spark Plug 400, Southern 500, National 500 and Atlanta Journal 500). In the fall of 1980, Elliott Racing gained its first major sponsor in the form of $500 from Harry Melling in the 1980 National 500 at Charlotte. Melling would extend his contract and gave the team enough sponsorship to run a 12 race schedule in 1981.

In 1981 Elliott Racing ran twelve races. Bill Elliott ran all twelve races (Daytona 500, Cola Cola 500, CRC Chemicals Rebel 500, Winston 500, World 600, Gabriel 400, Firecracker 400, Talladega 500, Champion Spark Plug 400, Southern 500, National 500, American 500 and Atlanta Journal 500).

After a 1981 season that consisted of one top-5 and seven top-10 finishes in 13 races, including the team's first pole in the CRC Chemicals Rebel 500, Harry Melling bought the team from George Elliott on December 1, 1981. Melling first became involved in NASCAR when his company Melling Tool sponsored Benny Parsons in 1979.

=== Secondary car history ===
Elliott Racing ran a second car under a variety of numbers. It began as the No. 53 when George Elliott entered Don Tilley at the 1966 American 500 but retired with steering failure.

The team didn't reappear until the 1971 Talladega 500 as the No. 94 and entered Harry Gailey finishing forty seven laps down.

In 1973 the team reappeared as the 09 for Charles Barrett to drive for four races (Atlanta 500, Dixie 500, Winston 500, World 600). Jody Ridley drove the No. 09 for the American 500.

In 1974 the 09 returned at the 1974 Talladega 500 for A.J. Reno but retired with steering failure.

The team returned as the No. 52 because of a contractual reason for the 1977 Southern 500 with Bill Elliott driving.

The team didn't return again until 1979 when Hamby Racing formed an alliance with Elliott Racing using the No. 17, with Bill Elliott driving (Champion Spark Plug 400 and Southern 500 under the Elliott Racing banner and Volunteer 500, Capital City 400 and American 500 under the Hamby Racing banner.)

== Driver history ==
- Don Tilley (1966)
- Harry Gailey (1971)
- Charles Barrett (1973)
- Jody Ridley (1973)
- A.J. Reno (1974)
- Bill Elliott (1976–1981)
- David Hobbs (1976)
- Al Holbert (1976)

== See also ==
- Bill Elliott Racing - team later formed by Bill Elliott
