= Dave James (racing driver) =

American racing driver (1928–1987)

- Born: David Lloyd James; September 30, 1928; Anamosa, Iowa, U.S.
- Died: May 9, 1987 (aged 58); San Siego, California, U.S.

NASCAR Cup Series career
- 8 races run over 6 years
- Best finish: 52nd (1958)
- First race: 1958 Crown America 500 (Riverside)
- Last race: 1969 Motor Trend 500 (Riverside)
Wins	Top tens	Poles
0	4	0

ARCA Menards Series West career
- 71 races run over 8 years
- Best finish: 4th (1966)
- First race: 1958 Crown America 500 (Riverside)
- Last race: 1969 Klamath Falls 100 (Klamath Falls)
- First win: 1968 Race 14 (Yakima)
Wins	Top tens	Poles
1	46	1

David Lloyd James (September 30, 1928 – May 9, 1987) was an American professional stock car racing driver. He competed in the NASCAR Grand National Series and NASCAR Pacific Coast Late Model Division.

== Racing career ==
James debuted in the NASCAR Grand National Series and NASCAR Pacific Coast Late Model Division simultaneously in 1958, finishing ninth in combination races at Riverside International Raceway and the California State Fairgrounds Race Track. He ran two more combination races in 1959, finishing seventh at Ascot Stadium and 20th at the California State Fairgrounds. James ran at least eleven Pacific Coast Late Model races in 1964, scoring at least eight top-tens. He finished 31st in the combination race at Riverside. In eleven known Pacific Coast Late Model starts in 1965, James scored at least eight more top-tens. He failed to qualify for the combination race at Riverside. In 1966, James ran fourteen of the fifteen Pacific Coast Late Model races held, scoring eight top-tens, seven of which were top-fives. He finished a career-best fourth in the standings. He finished 41st in the combination race at Riverside after engine issues caused him to retire after four laps. In 1967, James competed in thirteen of nineteen Pacific Coast Late Model races, scoring eleven top-tens, including nine top-fives. He ran eleven races in 1968, scoring his only career pole and win at Yakima Speedway and six total top-tens. He scored his final Grand National top-ten in the combination race at Riverside, finishing eighth. James ran his final NASCAR races in 1969, attempting seven total Pacific Coast Late Model races, failing to qualify at the California State Fairgrounds and scoring two top-ten finishes. In his final Grand National start, the 1969 Motor Trend 500, a combination race at Riverside, he finished 40th after retiring with rear end issues after five laps.

== Personal life ==
According to his gravestone, James was married to Violet James and was a United States Air Force veteran who served in the Korean War and Vietnam War.

== Motorsports career results ==
=== NASCAR ===
(key) (Bold – Pole position awarded by qualifying time. Italics – Pole position earned by points standings or practice time. * – Most laps led.)

==== Grand National Series ====
NASCAR Grand National Series results
Year	Team	No.	Make	1	2	3	4	5	6	7	8	9	10	11	12	13	14	15	16	17	18	19	20	21	22	23	24	25	26	27	28	29	30	31	32	33	34	35	36	37	38	39	40	41	42	43	44	45	46	47	48	49	50	51	52	53	54	55	56	57	58	59	60	61	62	NGNSC	Pts	Ref
1958	Joseph Heard	21	Chevy	FAY	DAB	CON	FAY	WIL	HBO	FAY	CLB	PIF	ATL	CLT	MAR	ODS	OBS	GPS	GBF	STR	NWS	BGS	TRN	RSD; 9	CLB	NBS	REF	LIN	HCY	AWS	RSP	MCC	SLS	TOR	BUF	MCF	BEL	BRR	CLB	NSV	AWS	BGS	MBS	DAR	CLT	BIR	CSF; 9	GAF	RCH	HBO	SAS	MAR	NWS	ATL												52nd	646	
1959	Unknown	8	Chevy	FAY	DAY	DAY	HBO	CON	ATL	WIL	BGS	CLB	NWS	REF	HCY	MAR	TRN	CLT	NSV	ASP; 7	PIF	GPS	ATL	CLB	WIL	RCH	BGS	AWS	DAY	HEI	CLT	MBS	CLT	NSV	AWS	BGS	GPS	CLB	DAR	HCY	RCH	CSF; 20	HBO	MAR	AWS	NWS	CON																			116th	48	
1964	Jack Alger	05W	Dodge	CON	AUG	JSP	SVH	RSD; 31	DAY	DAY	DAY	RCH	BRI	GPS	BGS	ATL	AWS	HBO	PIF	CLB	NWS	MAR	SVH	DAR	LGY	HCY	SBO	CLT	GPS	ASH	ATL	CON	NSV	CHT	BIR	VAL	PIF	DAY	ODS	OBS	BRR	ISP	GLN	LIN	BRI	NSV	MBS	AWS	DTS	ONA	CLB	BGS	STR	DAR	HCY	RCH	ODS	HBO	MAR	SVH	NWS	CLT	HAR	AUG	JAC	124th	100	
1965	Unknown	22	Dodge	RSD; DNQ	DAY	DAY	DAY	PIF	AWS	RCH	HBO	ATL	GPS	NWS	MAR	CLB	BRI	DAR	LGY	BGS	HCY	CLT	CCF	ASH	HAR	NSV	BIR	ATL	GPS	MBS	VAL	DAY	ODS	OBS	ISP	GLN	BRI	NSV	CCF	AWS	SMR	PIF	AUG	CLB	DTS	BLV	BGS	DAR	HCY	LIN	ODS	RCH	MAR	NWS	CLT	HBO	CAR	DTS								NA	0	
1966	Jim Whitehead	06	Plymouth	AUG	RSD; 41	DAY	DAY	DAY	CAR	BRI	ATL	HCY	CLB	GPS	BGS	NWS	MAR	DAR	LGY	MGR	MON	RCH	CLT	DTS	ASH	PIF	SMR	AWS	BLV	GPS	DAY	ODS	BRR	OXF	FON	ISP	BRI	SMR	NSV	ATL	CLB	AWS	BLV	BGS	DAR	HCY	RCH	HBO	MAR	NWS	CLT	CAR														NA	NA	
1968	Jim Whitehead	06	Plymouth	MGR	MGY	RSD; 8	DAY	BRI	RCH	ATL	HCY	GPS	CLB	NWS	MAR	AUG	AWS	DAR	BLV	LGY	CLT	ASH	MGR	SMR	BIR	CAR	GPS	DAY	ISP	OXF	FDA	TRN	BRI	SMR	NSV	ATL	CLB	BGS	AWS	SBO	LGY	DAR	HCY	RCH	BLV	HBO	MAR	NWS	AUG	CLT	CAR	JFC														72nd	NA	
1969	Jim Whitehead	106	Plymouth	MGR	MGY	RSD; 40	DAY	DAY	DAY	CAR	AUG	BRI	ATL	CLB	HCY	GPS	RCH	NWS	MAR	AWS	DAR	BLV	LGY	CLT	MGR	SMR	MCH	KPT	GPS	NCF	DAY	DOV	TPN	TRN	BLV	BRI	NSV	SMR	ATL	MCH	SBO	BGS	AWS	DAR	HCY	RCH	TAL	CLB	MAR	NWS	CLT	SVH	AUG	CAR	JFC	MGR	TWS									NA	NA	

==== Pacific Coast Late Model Division ====
NASCAR Pacific Coast Late Model Division results
Year	Team	No.	Make	1	2	3	4	5	6	7	8	9	10	11	12	13	14	15	16	17	18	19	20	21	22	23	24	25	26	27	28	29	NPCLMDC	Pts	Ref
1958	Joseph Heard	21	Chevy	GAR	GAR	GAR	BEL	RSD; 9	BAL	GAR	BAL	CSF; 9																					8th	760	
1959	Unknown	8	Chevy	ASP	ASP; 7	BEL	GAR	BAL	CSF; 20	KEA																							14th	602	
1964	Jack Alger	05W	Dodge	CSP	RSD; 31	SJS																											12th	1682	
1964	Tom Shreenan	06	Dodge				POR; 5	EVG; 10	YAK	EUG; 6		POR; 13	RAS	ASP	TAC	SAL	POR; 6	JBA	EVG	SGS	BKS	ASP; 16	OIR; 3	ASP	GHR	SWF	JBA	ASP	ASP; 7	POR			12th	1682	
1964	Jack Alger	05	Dodge								CTR; 8																						12th	1682	
1964	Mike Lewin	22	Dodge																												CSF; 9	ASP	12th	1682	
1965	Nila Lewin	22	Dodge	BRS; 10	RSD										ASP; 0†	CSF; 5																	6th	2112	
1965	Tom Shreenan	06	Dodge			SJS; 4		POR; 7	EVG; 8	BRS; 5	POR; 6	ASP	POR	ASP; 0†																			6th	2112	
1965	Tom Shreenan	06	Plymouth				ASP; 9																										6th	2112	
1965	Nila Lewin	06	Dodge														ASP; 0†																6th	2112	
1966	Jim Whitehead/Tom Shreenan	06	Plymouth	RSD; 41																													4th	2100	
1966	Tom Shreenan	06	Plymouth		S99; 12	ASP; 2	ASP; 3	DCS; 2	POR; 16	ASP	OSS; 11	VAL; 4	S99; 9	ASP; 2	AMP; 5	POR; 16	SGV; 3	CSF; 12															4th	2100	
1967	Jim Whitehead	06	Plymouth	AMP; 12	SGV	RSD	CPS; 10	SHA	SAL; 2	POR; 5	ASP; 3	SGV; 5	OSS; 8	ASP; 5	ACF; 4	RVR	SAL	JBA	YAK; 5	EVG; 15	ASP; 3	CSP; 3											7th	2216	
1968	Jim Whitehead	06	Plymouth	RSD; 3	ASP	KEA	VAL	ASP; 5	AMP	DCS; 2	POR; 13	EVG; 22	EUG; 22	MED; 18	OSS; 3	TCR; 4	**YAK**; 1*	EVG; 11	EUR	BKS	S99; 22	CSP	SGS										12th	611	
1969	Jim Whitehead	106	Plymouth	RSD; 40																													NA	NA	
1969	Jim Whitehead	06	Plymouth		CSF; DNQ	SGV										SON; 12	YAK; 8	EVG; 10	CPR; 19	POR	SMS	SGV	TWS										NA	NA	
1969	J.R. Van Curren	04	Plymouth				SON; 16	EVG	TCR	YAK	DCS	SAL	JBA	OSS	SGS																		NA	NA	

† - It is known James participated in these races, but his final position is unknown.
