= Bay Darnell =

American stock car and open-wheel racing driver (1931–2023)

- Born: Wilbur Darnell; February 4, 1931; Lake Bluff, Illinois, U.S.
- Died: February 28, 2023 (aged 92); Waukegan, Illinois, U.S.

NASCAR Cup Series career
- 3 races run over 3 years
- Best finish: 118th (1967)
- First race: 1954 Willow Springs 200 (Willow Springs)
- Last race: 1967 Atlanta 500 (Atlanta)
Wins	Top tens	Poles
0	0	0

USAC Stock Car
- Years active: 1962–1983
- Starts: 249
- Wins: 4
- Best finish: 2nd in 1979

Previous series
- 1964, 1982–83 1965–1968 1981–1983: ARCA Series; USAC Indy Car; ASA National Tour

Wilbur Darnell (February 4, 1931 – February 28, 2023) was an American racing driver from Lake Bluff, Illinois. He raced mainly in USAC Stock Cars, but he did have a few Indy Car and NASCAR Grand National Series starts. His grandson Erik Darnell is a current NASCAR driver.

== Racing career ==
=== Early career ===
Darnell began racing Modifieds on the dirt tracks in northern Illinois and southern Wisconsin, especially Waukegan Speedway.

=== USAC Stock Car ===
Darnell began racing in USAC Stock Car in 1962. He became the second driver to land in Lake Lloyd at the Daytona International Speedway during a rare appearance in an ARCA stock car. He went into the infield lake during a February 8, 1964 qualifying race for the ARCA 250.

Darnell finished third in the season points in 1973, his first time in the top three. In 1974, Darnell had his first USAC win at the Indiana State Fairgrounds after racing for 13 seasons. He led the final five laps at the one mile dirt oval. Darnell was forced to race his asphalt car after his dirt car was wrecked during the previous week's race at the Springfield Mile. Darnell drove with a broken shoulder from the earlier incident. Darnell's second USAC victory happened on the clay at the 100-mile race at DuQuoin State Fairgrounds Racetrack on August 28, 1976. His third USAC stock car win happened on June 5 in the following year at Texas World Speedway. After starting tenth, he won on the two-mile asphalt superspeedway. He took the lead on lap 148 of 250.

In the middle of the 1978 season, Darnell finished fifth at Springfield. The following week he was ruled to have jumped the final restart prematurely at DuQuoin and he was awarded a second-place finish instead of the win. In an interview with the Milwaukee Sentinel, Darnell talked about how he felt that he could win the championship that year. After having mechanical difficulties in the August 17th race at the Milwaukee Mile caused him to lose hundreds of points in the third last race of the season, he said, "If I hadn't fallen out of the Milwaukee 150, I'd be ahead (in points) right now." Darnell finished third in points that season. The following year he earned his career-best second points finish, one position better than Rusty Wallace. He dropped to third in the 1980 season points and tied his career-best second-place points finish in 1982. He earned his final USAC victory on August 15 of that year on the dirt at the Springfield Mile. He raced his final USAC race in the middle of 1983 and the series folded after running only two events in 1984.

=== NASCAR ===
Darnell made three NASCAR Grand National Series starts in his career. In 1954, he started 17th at the only NASCAR race Santa Fe Speedway in Willow Springs, Illinois. His car overheated and he retired at the 18th lap of the race finishing last in the 23 car field. He made his second start in 1964, starting 23rd for Holman Moody at Atlanta International Raceway. In a race of high attrition, he completed 205 of 334 laps before ending with push rod failure to finish 13th in the 39-car field. His final NASCAR start was in 1967 when he raced in his own car at Atlanta. He started 39th and finished 32nd in the 44-car field.

=== Indy Car ===
Darnell raced in three Indy Car races. His first champ car start was at the DuQuoin in 1965. He finished ninth in the 18-car field. Darnell returned for this final two Indy Car races in 1968. He raced at Trenton Speedway, finishing 14th with engine problems. Later that season, he raced at his home race at the Milwaukee Mile. He was involved in a wreck on the second lap and finished 23rd.

== Business ==
Darnell owned a trucking company in the Chicago area. He also built USAC stock cars and in 1977 the St. Petersburg Times called him a "master car builder" who "builds and maintains his own equipment which is considered among the best."

== Personal life and death ==
Darnell was the father of Danny Darnell, a well-known Midwestern short-track driver, and grandfather of NASCAR driver Erik Darnell.

Bay Darnell died in Waukegan, Illinois on February 28, 2023, at the age of 92.

== Motorsports career results ==
=== NASCAR ===
(key) (Bold – Pole position awarded by qualifying time. Italics – Pole position earned by points standings or practice time. * – Most laps led.)

==== Grand National Series ====
NASCAR Grand National Series results
Year	Team	No.	Make	1	2	3	4	5	6	7	8	9	10	11	12	13	14	15	16	17	18	19	20	21	22	23	24	25	26	27	28	29	30	31	32	33	34	35	36	37	38	39	40	41	42	43	44	45	46	47	48	49	50	51	52	53	54	55	56	57	58	59	60	61	62	NGNC	Pts	Ref
1954		69	Ford	PBS	DAB	JSP	ATL	OSP	OAK	NWS	HBO	CCS	LAN	WIL	MAR	SHA	RSP	CLT	GAR	CLB	LND	HCY	MCF	WGS	PIF	AWS	SFS; 23	GRS	MOR	OAK	CLT	SAN	COR	DAR	CCS	CLT	LAN	MAS	MAR	NWS																										NA	–	
1964	Holman-Moody	66	Ford	CON	AUG	JSP	SVH	RSD	DAY	DAY	DAY	RCH	BRI	GPS	BGS	ATL; 13	AWS	HBO	PIF	CLB	NWS	MAR	SVH	DAR	LGY	HCY	SBO	CLT	GPS	ASH	ATL	CON	NSV	CHT	BIR	VAL	PIF	DAY	ODS	OBS	BRR	ISP	GLN	LIN	BRI	NSV	MBS	AWS	DTS	ONA	CLB	BGS	STR	DAR	HCY	RCH	ODS	HBO	MAR	SVH	NWS	CLT	HAR	AUG	JAC	NA	–	
1965	Jack Watts		Ford	RSD	DAY	DAY	DAY; DNQ	PIF	AWS	RCH	HBO	ATL	GPS	NWS	MAR	CLB	BRI	DAR	LGY	BGS	HCY	CLT	CCF	ASH	HAR	NSV	BIR	ATL	GPS	MBS	VAL	DAY	ODS	OBS	ISP	GLN	BRI	NSV	CCF	AWS	SMR	PIF	AUG	CLB	DTS	BLV	BGS	DAR	HCY	LIN	ODS	RCH	MAR	NWS	CLT	HBO	CAR	DTS								NA	–	
1967	Bay Darnell Racing	66	Plymouth	AUG	RSD	DAY	DAY	DAY	AWS	BRI	GPS	BGS	ATL; 32	CLB	HCY	NWS	MAR	SVH	RCH	DAR	BLV	LGY	CLT	ASH	MGR	SMR	BIR	CAR	GPS	MGY	DAY	TRN	OXF	FDA	ISP	BRI	SMR	NSV	ATL	BGS	CLB	SVH	DAR	HCY	RCH	BLV	HBO	MAR	NWS	CLT	CAR	AWS														118th	100	

===== Daytona 500 =====
Year	Team	Manufacturer	Start	Finish
1965	Jack Watts	Ford	DNQ	
