= Dick Hutcherson =

American racing driver (1931–2005)

Richard Leon "Dick" Hutcherson
- Born: November 30, 1931; Keokuk, Iowa, United States
- Died: November 6, 2005 (aged 73)
- Awards: 1963 and 1964 IMCA Stock Car champion

NASCAR Cup Series career
- 103 races run over 4 years
- Best finish: 2nd (1965)
- First race: 1964 Greenville 200 (Greenville)
- Last race: 1967 Western North Carolina 500 (Weaverville)
- First win: 1965 Greenville 200 (Greenville)
- Last win: 1967 Dixie 500 (Atlanta)
Wins	Top tens	Poles
14	73	21

Richard Leon Hutcherson (November 30, 1931 – November 6, 2005) was an American businessman and a former stock car racer. A native of Keokuk, Iowa, Hutcherson drove in NASCAR competition from 1964 to 1967. He won 14 races, finishing runner-up in his first full season in 1965 and third in 1967, but after four years of top-level racing he retired at the season's end to devote his energies to Hutcherson-Pagan Enterprises, a chassis-building business in Charlotte, North Carolina. His younger brother Ron also became a stock car racer.

== IMCA ==
Hutcherson hailed from Keokuk, Iowa, which has long been called the "Home of Champions" and the "Racing Capital of the World". He was nicknamed The "Keokuk Comet". The “Keokuk Gang” consisted of “Old Man” Ernie Derr, Don White, Ramo Stott and Hutcherson himself. Dick Hutcherson said of Derr: "Got to beat the old man. The old man will be tough to beat if you have to haul him out in a wheelchair." He started racing in 1956 and moved up to the International Motor Contest Association (IMCA) circuit in 1959. Hutch was a quick learner and very competitive and took the IMCA Stock Car championship in 1963 and 1964. He was the Late Model champion at Huron, South Dakota’s Dakota State Fair Speedway in 1960 and 1964. He has 81 IMCA wins to his credit. During this time, he also raced in the Midwest Association for Race Cars circuit.

== NASCAR career ==
While racing in the Midwest, Hutcherson kept hearing about the great racing and the big purses in NASCAR, so he moved south and started on the Grand National circuit. On March 28, 1964, at the Greenville-Pickens Speedway in South Carolina, the former IMCA champion was a surprise entry and put his Ford on the pole for his debut race. He led the first 60 laps before being overtaken; failure of lug bolts on his right front wheel forced him to the pits after his 109th lap.

Hutcherson won 14 NASCAR races in 103 starts in the No. 29 Holman Moody car from 1965 to 1967. Holman Moody dominated the 1965 season and Dick was the hands-down favorite to win rookie of the year, but was ruled ineligible because he was a past champion in IMCA. Hutch took nine victories that season, including the impressive feat of winning the pole position in back-to-back events at Myrtle Beach (which he won) and Valdosta. He nearly won the NASCAR championship in his first full season, settling for second behind Ned Jarrett.

In 1966, Ford briefly withdrew from official factory participation in NASCAR. Contracted to race for Ford, Hutcherson was assigned to the team of drivers in the World Sportscar championship as part of Ford's challenge to the dominance of Ferrari. Hutcherson and Ronnie Bucknum co-drove the third place #5 GT-40 Mark IIA at the 24 Hours of Le Mans, completing a three-car photo finish orchestrated by Ford executives to increase world-wide photo publication of the achievement. Despite only competing in 14 NASCAR Grand National races that season, he took three wins as part of Ford's factory team run by Holman Moody.

In 1967, Hutcherson made 33 starts with two wins, 22 top 5s, and ranked third overall in points. He won the Smoky Mountain 200 at Maryville on July 27 and the Dixie 500 at Atlanta on August 6, the latter coming after Richard Petty blew an engine while leading and immediately preceding Petty's streak of ten straight wins. A string of top-five finishes toward the end of the season, including leading late in the race at Rockingham only to succumb to engine problems, solidified third in the points despite running only 33 times compared to Petty's 48 and James Hylton's 46. Hutcherson averaged 1,020 points per race as compared to Petty's 885 points and Hylton's 792. He retired at the end of the season.

== After retirement ==
With 22 poles and 14 wins between 1964 and 1968, Hutcherson retired from full-schedule racing to concentrate on his chassis-building business in Charlotte, NC. After four years of top-level racing, he became crew chief for his friend and fellow driver David Pearson in 1968. The combination won the championship in 1968 and 1969. In 1968, he also appeared in the Elvis Presley stock car racing movie Speedway.

Another step in his career became a reality after his tenure with Pearson when he was named general manager of Holman-Moody, a position he held until December 1971 when he and West Coast driver Eddie Pagan formed Hutcherson-Pagan, a business to build and repair race cars. The two were very successful as they built cars for A. J. Foyt, Darrell Waltrip, Rick Wilson, and others.

Recalling his involvement with Foyt, Hutcherson said that "A.J. had bought a Camaro to run USAC stock cars and we were running at Texas World Speedway at College Station. He had gotten mad about what some reporters had written about him in the days before the race. Well he sat on the pole and was leading the race when he pulled in with just a couple laps to go. I leaned in the car and asked him what was wrong and he said, 'Overheating.' I looked at the gauges which were normal and said, 'Why'd you pull out?' He looked at me and said, 'I didn't want to talk to those reporters in Victory Circle.' We had the race won and he parked the damn car!"

In 1976, Hutcherson un-retired to drive at the 24 Hours of Le Mans again. He co-drove a 7-liter Ford Torino with Dick Brooks and Marcel Migiot. The Torino retired in the 11th hour with an oil leak.

Hutcherson become sole owner of the firm after the death of Eddie Pagan in 1984. One of the sport's most successful car building operations over the last 30 years, Hutcherson-Pagan parts trucks are still a familiar site around the nation's race tracks. After being a former owner, President, and one of the founders of Hutcherson-Pagan, Dick retired. He died on November 6, 2005, on his way home from Florida.

== Motorsports career results ==
=== NASCAR ===
(key) (Bold – Pole position awarded by qualifying time. Italics – Pole position earned by points standings or practice time. * – Most laps led.)

==== Grand National Series ====
NASCAR Grand National Series results
Year	Team	No.	Make	1	2	3	4	5	6	7	8	9	10	11	12	13	14	15	16	17	18	19	20	21	22	23	24	25	26	27	28	29	30	31	32	33	34	35	36	37	38	39	40	41	42	43	44	45	46	47	48	49	50	51	52	53	54	55	56	57	58	59	60	61	62	NGNC	Pts
1964	Dick Hutcherson	1	Ford	CON	AUG	JSP	SAV	RSD	DAY	DAY	DAY	RCH	BRI	**GPS**; 15	BGS	ATL	ASW	HBO; 2																																																76th	1200
1964	Dick Hutcherson	7	Ford																**PIF**; 13	CLB; 5	NWS	MAR	SAV	DAR	LGY	HCY	SBO	CLT	GPS	ASH	ATL	CON	NSV	CHT	BIR	VAL	PIF	DAY	ODS	OBS	BRR	ISP	GLN	LIN	BRI	NSV	MBS	ASW	DTS	WVA	CLB	BGS	STR	DAR	HCY	RCH	ODS	HBO	MAR	SAV	NWS	CLT	HAR	AUG	JAC	76th	1200
1965	Holman Moody	29	Ford	RSD; 31	DAY; 14	DAY	DAY; 7	**PIF**; 5	ASW; 2	RCH; 16	HBO; 12	ATL; 4	GPS; 1	NWS; 4	MAR; 3	CLB; 5	BRI; 2	DAR; 4	**LGY**; 2	BGS; 3	HCY; 18	CLT; 3	**CCF**; 3	ASH; 17	HAR; 4	NSV; 1	BIR; 2	ATL; 8	GPS; 1	**MBS**; 1	**VAL**; 12	DAY; 19	ODS; 2	OBS; 2	ISP; 2	**GLN**; 12	BRI; 2	NSV; 15	CCF; 3	AWS; 3	SMR; 1	**PIF**; 9	AUG; 1	**CLB**; 3	DTS; 1	BLV; 12	BGS; 3	DAR; 19	HCY; 15	LIN; 1	ODS	**RCH**; 25	MAR; 6	NWS; 32	CLT; 2		CAR; 7	DTS								2nd	35790
1965	Holman Moody	47	Ford																																																					**HBO**; 1										2nd	35790
1966	Holman Moody	29	Ford	AUG	RSD; 5	DAY	**DAY**; 3	DAY; 35	CAR; 29	BRI; 1	ATL; 3	HCY	CLB	GPS	BGS	NWS	MAR	DAR	LGY	MGR	MON	RCH	CLT	DTS	ASH	PIF	SMR	AWS	BLV	GPS	DAY	ODS	BRR	OXF	FON	ISP	BRI	SMR	NSV	ATL	CLB; 5	AWS; 25	BLV	BGS	DAR; 7	HCY	RCH	**HBO**; 1*	MAR; 4	NWS; 1	CLT; 42	CAR; 33														28th	9392
1967	Bondy Long	29	Ford	**AUG**; 17	**RSD**; 39	DAY	DAY; 4	DAY; 36	AWS	BRI; 5	**GPS**; 7	BGS	ATL; 2	**CLB**; 3	HCY; 2	NWS; 3	MAR; 4	SVH	RCH; 3	DAR; 3	BLV	LGY	CLT; 6	ASH	MGR	SMR; 3	BIR	CAR; 2	GPS; 2	MGY	DAY; 2	TRN	OXF	FDA	ISP	BRI; 2	**SMR**; 1	**NSV**; 11	ATL; 1	BGS	CLB; 24	SVH; 10	DAR; 36	**HCY**; 24	RCH; 2	BLV	HBO; 2	MAR; 2	**NWS**; 2	CLT; 3	CAR; 13															3rd	33658
1967	Holman Moody	66	Ford																																																	AWS; 4														3rd	33658

===== Daytona 500 results =====
Year	Team	Manufacturer	Start	Finish
1965	Holman Moody	Ford	26	7
1966	Holman Moody	Ford	2	35
1967	Holman Moody	Ford	10	36

=== 24 Hours of Le Mans results ===
24 Hours of Le Mans results
Year	Team	Co-Drivers	Car	Class	Laps	Pos.	Class Pos.
1966	(United States) Holman & Moody / Essex Wire Corp.	(United States) Ronnie Bucknum	Ford GT40 Mk.II	P +5.0	348	**3rd**	**3rd**
1976	(United States) Donlavey Racing	(United States) Dick Brooks (France) Marcel Mignot	Ford Torino	NASCAR	104	DNF	DNF
