= Worth McMillion =

Racecar driver from Virginia

- Born: October 6, 1926; Amelia, Virginia, U.S.
- Died: June 5, 2015 (aged 88); Amelia, Virginia, U.S.

NASCAR Cup Series career
- 62 races run over 8 years
- Best finish: 30th (1964)
- First race: 1962 untitled race (South Boston)
- Last race: 1969 Richmond 500 (Richmond)
Wins	Top tens	Poles
0	18	0

Hollingsworth "Worth" McMillion (October 6, 1926 – June 5, 2015) was a NASCAR Grand National driver who participated from 1962 to 1969 for 62 races.

== Career ==
McMillion's first event was the 1962 untitled race at South Boston Speedway while his final event was the 1969 Richmond 500. McMillion has finished in the top-five once, and eighteen times in the top-ten. Total earnings for this driver were $15,690 ($137,750.23 when considering inflation) after competing in 9,142.0 miles (14,712.6 km) of stock car racing experience. While McMillion had raced in 16161 laps, he was the leader in none of them. His average start was 24th place while his average finish was in 14th place.

From 1962 to 1965, McMillion was a driver/owner. Starting in 1965, Worth McMillion drove for other owners like Allen McMillion and Roy Tyner. Most of his races were done in Pontiac vehicles (either in a 1962 Pontiac Catalina or in 1964 generic Pontiac vehicle) while two races would have him use a generic 1962 Chevrolet vehicle. The most money that McMillion has ever earned in a race was at the 1964 World 600 at Charlotte Motor Speedway. He would earn $1,200 ($12,457.08 when considering inflation) for his 14th-place finish after starting in 37th place (out of 44 qualifying drivers).

== Motorsports career results ==
=== NASCAR ===
(key) (Bold – Pole position awarded by qualifying time. Italics – Pole position earned by points standings or practice time. * – Most laps led.)

==== Grand National Series ====
NASCAR Grand National Series results
Year	Team	No.	Make	1	2	3	4	5	6	7	8	9	10	11	12	13	14	15	16	17	18	19	20	21	22	23	24	25	26	27	28	29	30	31	32	33	34	35	36	37	38	39	40	41	42	43	44	45	46	47	48	49	50	51	52	53	54	55	56	57	58	59	60	61	62	NGNC	Pts	Ref
1962	McMillion Racing	83	Pontiac	CON	AWS	DAY	DAY	DAY	CON	AWS	SVH	HBO	RCH	CLB	NWS	GPS	MBS	MAR	BGS	BRI	RCH	HCY	CON	DAR	PIF	CLT	ATL	BGS	AUG	RCH	SBO; 14	DAY	CLB	ASH	GPS	AUG	SVH	MBS	BRI; 24	CHT	NSV	HUN	AWS; 12	STR; 16	BGS	PIF	VAL	DAR	HCY	RCH	DTS	AUG	MAR	NWS	CLT	ATL										72nd	616	
1963	McMillion Racing	83	Chevy	BIR	GGS	THS	RSD	DAY	DAY	DAY	PIF	AWS	HBO	ATL	HCY	BRI	AUG	RCH; 10	GPS	SBO	BGS						ODS; 12																																							34th	4614	
1963	McMillion Racing	83	Pontiac																			MAR; 16	NWS	CLB	THS	DAR		RCH; 10	CLT; 21	BIR	ATL	DAY	MBS	SVH	DTS	BGS	ASH	OBS; 11	BRR; 14	BRI; 20	GPS	NSV	CLB	AWS; 13	PIF	BGS	ONA; DNQ	DAR	HCY	RCH; 8	MAR; 16	DTS; 9	NWS	THS	CLT; 29	SBO; 11	HBO; 12	RSD								34th	4614	
1964	McMillion Racing	83	Pontiac	CON; 14	AUG	JSP	SVH	RSD	DAY	DAY	DAY	RCH; 18	BRI	GPS	BGS	ATL	AWS	HBO; 8	PIF	CLB	NWS	MAR; 11	SVH	DAR	LGY; 8	HCY	SBO; 8	CLT; 14	GPS	ASH	ATL	CON	NSV	CHT	BIR	VAL	PIF; 18	DAY	ODS; 13	OBS	BRR	ISP	GLN	LIN	BRI; 15	NSV	MBS	AWS	DTS; 9	ONA; 12	CLB	BGS	STR; 10	DAR	HCY	RCH; 13	ODS; 7	HBO; 12	MAR; 20	SVH	NWS	CLT; 17	HAR	AUG	JAC	30th	758th	
1965	McMillion Racing	80	Pontiac	RSD	DAY	DAY	DAY	PIF	AWS	RCH	HBO	ATL	GPS	NWS	MAR	CLB	BRI	DAR	LGY; 11	BGS	HCY	CLT	CCF	ASH	HAR	NSV	BIR	ATL	GPS	MBS	VAL	DAY	ODS; 16	OBS; 13	ISP	GLN	BRI; 13	NSV	CCF	AWS	SMR	PIF	AUG	CLB	DTS	BLV; 8	BGS				ODS; 28	RCH; 31	MAR	NWS		HBO; 9		DTS; 12								47th	3794	
1965	McMillion Racing	83	Pontiac																																													DAR; DNQ	HCY	LIN					CLT; DNQ		CAR; 13									47th	3794	
1966	McMillion Racing	83	Pontiac	AUG; 17	RSD	DAY	DAY	DAY	CAR; 10	BRI	ATL	HCY	CLB	GPS	BGS	NWS	MAR; 17	DAR					CLT; DNQ	DTS; 9	ASH	PIF	SMR	AWS	BLV; 11	GPS	DAY	ODS; 11	BRR	OXF	FON	ISP	BRI; DNQ	SMR	NSV	ATL	CLB	AWS	BLV	BGS	DAR	HCY	RCH; 27	HBO	MAR	NWS	CLT	CAR														52nd	3526	
1966	McMillion Racing	80	Pontiac																LGY; 14	MGR	MON	RCH; 10																																												52nd	3526	
1967	McMillion Racing	83	Pontiac	AUG	RSD	DAY	DAY	DAY	AWS	BRI	GPS	BGS	ATL	CLB	HCY	NWS	MAR	SVH	RCH; 6	DAR	BLV	LGY	CLT	ASH	MGR	SMR	BIR	CAR	GPS	MGY	DAY	TRN	OXF	FDA	ISP	BRI	SMR	NSV	ATL	BGS	CLB	SVH	DAR	HCY	RCH; 7	BLV	HBO	MAR	NWS	CLT	CAR	AWS														83rd	818	
1968	McMillion Racing	83	Pontiac	MGR	MGY	RSD	DAY	BRI	RCH	ATL	HCY	GPS	CLB	NWS	MAR	AUG	AWS	DAR	BLV	LGY	CLT	ASH	MGR	SMR	BIR	CAR	GPS	DAY	ISP	OXF	FDA	TRN	BRI	SMR	NSV	ATL	CLB	BGS	AWS	SBO	LGY	DAR	HCY	RCH; 18	BLV	HBO; 5	MAR; 26	NWS	AUG	CLT	CAR	JFC														NA	-	
1969	Roy Tyner	9	Pontiac	MGR	MGY	RSD	DAY	DAY	DAY	CAR	AUG	BRI	ATL	CLB	HCY	GPS	RCH; 14	NWS	MAR	AWS	DAR	BLV	LGY	CLT	MGR	SMR	MCH	KPT	GPS	NCF	DAY	DOV	TPN	TRN	BLV	BRI	NSV	SMR	ATL	MCH	SBO	BGS	AWS	DAR	HCY	RCH	TAL	CLB	MAR	NWS	CLT	SVH	AUG	CAR	JFC	MGR	TWS									77th	74	
