= 1964 NASCAR Grand National Series =

Seasons
- ← 1963 1965 →

The 1964 NASCAR Grand National Series was the 16th season of professional stock car racing in the United States. The season, which began on November 10, 1963 at Concord Speedway in Midland, North Carolina, was contested over 62 races. The season ended at Speedway Park in Jacksonville, Florida, on November 8, 1964. Richard Petty was the drivers' champion. Doug Cooper was the Rookie of the Year.

== Race Results ==
D Dirt oval
P Paved oval

No	Date	Race	Track	Track type		Pole Position	Winning Driver	Report
No	Date	Race	Track	Pavement/shape	Length category	Pole Position	Winning Driver	Report
1	11/10/1963	Textile 250	Concord Speedway (Midland, NC)	P paved oval	short track	David Pearson	Ned Jarrett	Report
2	11/17/1963		Augusta International Raceway (Hephzibah, GA)	P dirt oval	short track	Fred Lorenzen	Fireball Roberts	
3	12/01/1963	Turkey Day 200	Speedway Park (Jacksonville. FL)	P dirt oval	short track	Jack Smith	Wendell Scott	Report
4	12/29/1963	Sunshine 200	Savannah Speedway (Savannah, GA)	P paved oval	short track	Ned Jarrett	Richard Petty	
5	01/19/1964	Motor Trend 500	Riverside International Raceway (Riverside, CA)	P paved course	road course	Fred Lorenzen	Dan Gurney	
6	02/21/1964	Twin 125 #1	Daytona International Speedway (Daytona Beach, FL)	T paved oval	long/high speed	Paul Goldsmith	Junior Johnson	
7	02/21/1964	Twin 125 #1	Daytona International Speedway (Daytona Beach, FL)	T paved oval	long/high speed	Richard Petty	Bobby Isaac	
8	02/23/1964	Daytona 500	Daytona International Speedway (Daytona Beach, FL)	T paved oval	long/high speed	Paul Goldsmith	Richard Petty	Report
9	03/10/1964	Richmond 250	Richmond Raceway (Richmond, VA)	P paved oval	short track	Ned Jarrett	David Pearson	
10	03/22/1964	Southeastern 500	Bristol International Speedway (Bristol, TN)	P paved oval	short track	Marvin Panch	Fred Lorenzen	
11	03/28/1964	Greenville 200	Greenville-Pickens Speedway (Easley, SC)	D dirt oval	short track	Dick Hutcherson	David Pearson	
12	03/30/1964		Bowman Gray Stadium (Winston-Salem, NC)	P paved oval	short track	Marvin Panch	Marvin Panch	
13	04/05/1964	Atlanta 500	Atlanta Motor Speedway (Hampton, GA)	D paved oval	intermediate	Fred Lorenzen	Fred Lorenzen	Report
14	04/11/1964		Asheville Weaverville Speedway (Weaverville, NC)	D dirt oval	short track	Marvin Panch	Marvin Panch	
15	04/12/1964	Joe Weatherly 150	Orange Speedway (Hillsborough, NC)	D dirt oval	short track	David Pearson	David Pearson	
16	04/14/1964		Piedmont Interstate Fairgrounds (Spartanburg, SC)	D dirt oval	short track	Dick Hutcherson	Ned Jarrett	
17	04/16/1964	Columbia 200	Columbia Speedway (Cayce, SC)	P dirt oval	short track	David Pearson	Ned Jarrett	
18	04/19/1964	Gwyn Staley 400	North Wilkesboro Speedway (North Wilkesboro, NC)	P paved oval	short track	Fred Lorenzen	Fred Lorenzen	
19	04/26/1964	Virginia 500	Martinsville Speedway (Manassas, VA)	D dirt oval	short track	Fred Lorenzen	Fred Lorenzen	
20	05/01/1964	Savannah 200	Savannah Speedway (Savannah, GA)	D paved oval	short track	Jimmy Pardue	LeeRoy Yarbrough	Report
21	05/09/1964	Rebel 300	Darlington Raceway (Darlington, SC)	P paved oval	intermediate	Fred Lorenzen	Fred Lorenzen	
22	05/15/1964	Tidewater 250	Langley Field Speedway (Hampton, VA)	D dirt oval	short track	David Pearson	Ned Jarrett	
23	05/16/1964	Hickory 250	Hickory Speedway (Hickory, NC)	D dirt oval	short track	Junior Johnson	Ned Jarrett	
24	05/17/1964	South Boston 400	South Boston Speedway (South Boston, VA)	P paved oval	short track	Marvin Panch	Richard Petty	
25	05/24/1964	World 600	Charlotte Motor Speedway (Concord, NC)	P paved oval	intermediate	Jimmy Pardue	Jim Paschal	Report
26	05/30/1964	Pickens 200	Greenville-Pickens Speedway (Easley, SC)	D dirt oval	short track	Marvin Panch	LeeRoy Yarbrough	
27	05/31/1964		New Asheville Speedway (Asheville, NC)	D dirt oval	short track	Richard Petty	Ned Jarrett	
28	06/07/1964	Dixie 400	Atlanta Motor Speedway (Hampton, GA)	D paved oval	intermediate	Junior Johnson	Ned Jarrett	
29	06/11/1964		Concord Speedway (Midland, NC)	P paved oval	short track	Richard Petty	Richard Petty	
30	06/14/1964	Music City 200	Nashville Speedway (Nashville, TN)	P paved oval	short track	Richard Petty	Richard Petty	
31	06/19/1964	Confederate 300	Boyd's Speedway, (Ringgold, GA)	D dirt oval	short track	Richard Petty	David Pearson	
32	06/21/1964		Fairgrounds Raceway (Birmingham, AL)	P paved oval	short track	David Pearson	Ned Jarrett	
33	06/23/1964		Valdosta 75 Speedway (Valdosta, GA)	D dirt oval	short track	Ned Jarrett	Buck Baker	
34	06/26/1964		Piedmont Interstate Fairgrounds (Spartanburg, SC)	D dirt oval	short track	David Pearson	Richard Petty	
35	07/04/1964	Firecracker 400	Daytona International Speedway (Daytona Beach, FL)	T paved oval	long/high speed	Darel Dieringer	A. J. Foyt	Report
36	07/08/1964	Old Dominion 400	Old Dominion Speedway (Thornburg, VA)	P paved oval	short track	Ned Jarrett	Ned Jarrett	
37	07/10/1964	Fireball Roberts 200	Old Bridge Stadium (Old Bridge Township, NJ)	P paved oval	short track	Billy Wade	Billy Wade	
38	07/12/1964		Bridgehampton Raceway (Sag Harbor, NY)	P paved road course	road course	Richard Petty	Billy Wade	
39	07/15/1964		Islip Speedway (Islip, NY)	P paved oval	short track	Billy Wade	Billy Wade	
40	07/19/1964	The Glen 151.8	Watkins Glen International (Dix, NY)	P paved road course	road course	Billy Wade	Billy Wade	Report
41	07/21/1964	Pennsylvania 200	Lincoln Speedway (New Oxford, PA)	D dirt oval	short track	David Pearson	David Pearson	Report
42	07/26/1964	Volunteer 500	Bristol International Speedway (Bristol, TN)	P paved oval	short track	Richard Petty	Fred Lorenzen	Report
43	08/02/1964	Nashville 400	Nashville Speedway (Nashville, TN)	P paved oval	short track	Richard Petty	Richard Petty	Report
44	08/07/1964		Rambi Raceway (Myrtle Beach, SC)	P paved oval	short track	David Pearson	David Pearson	
45	08/09/1964	Western North Carolina 500	Asheville Weaverville Speedway (Weaverville, NC)	D dirt oval	short track	Junior Johnson	Ned Jarrett	
46	08/13/1964	Moyock 300	Dog Track Speedway (Moyock, NC)	D dirt oval	short track	Ned Jarrett	Ned Jarrett	
47	08/16/1964	Mountaineer 300	West Virginia International Speedway (Huntington, WV)	D dirt oval	short track	Billy Wade	Richard Petty	
48	08/21/1964	Sandlapper 200	Columbia Speedway (Cayce, SC)	P dirt oval	short track	Ned Jarrett	David Pearson	
49	08/22/1964	Myers Brothers 200	Bowman Gray Stadium (Winston-Salem, NC)	P paved oval	short track	Junior Johnson	Junior Johnson	
50	08/23/1964		Starkey Speedway, (Roanoke, VA)	P paved oval	short track	Glen Wood	Junior Johnson	
51	09/07/1964	Southern 500	Darlington Raceway (Darlington, SC)	P paved oval	intermediate	Richard Petty	Buck Baker	
52	09/11/1964	Buddy Shuman 250	Hickory Speedway (Hickory, NC)	D dirt oval	short track	David Pearson	David Pearson	
53	09/14/1964	Capital City 300	Richmond Raceway (Richmond, VA)	P paved oval	short track	Ned Jarrett	Cotton Owens	Report
54	09/18/1964		Old Dominion Speedway (Thornburg, VA)	P paved oval	short track	David Pearson	Ned Jarrett	
55	09/20/1964		Orange Speedway (Hillsborough, NC)	D dirt oval	short track	David Pearson	Ned Jarrett	
56	09/27/1964	Old Dominion 500	Martinsville Speedway (Manassas, VA)	D dirt oval	short track	Fred Lorenzen	Fred Lorenzen	Report
57	10/09/1964		Savannah Speedway (Savannah, GA)	D paved oval	short track	Ned Jarrett	Ned Jarrett	
58	10/11/1964	Wilkes 400	North Wilkesboro Speedway (North Wilkesboro, NC)	P paved oval	short track	Junior Johnson	Marvin Panch	Report
59	10/18/1964	National 400	Charlotte Motor Speedway (Concord, NC)	P paved oval	intermediate	Richard Petty	Fred Lorenzen	
60	10/25/1964		Harris Speedway, (Harris, NC)	P paved oval	short track	Billy Wade	Richard Petty	
61	11/01/1964	Jaycee 300	Augusta International Raceway (Hephzibah, GA)	P dirt oval	short track	Ned Jarrett	Darel Dieringer	
62	11/08/1964		Speedway Park (Jacksonville. FL)	P dirt oval	short track	Doug Yates	Ned Jarrett	

== Driver Standings ==
No	Driver	Points	Starts	Poles	Wins	Top 5s	Top 10s	Laps	Laps Led	$ Earnings
1	Richard Petty	40,252	61	8	9	37	43	14,041	3405	114,771
2	Ned Jarrett	34,950	60	9	15	40	45	13,325	3304	71,924
3	David Pearson	32,146	61	12	8	29	42	13,225	2385	45,542
4	Billy Wade	28,474	36	5	4	12	25	7,627	954	36,095
5	Jimmy Pardue	26,570	50	2	0	14	24	9,412	237	41,597
6	Curtis Crider	25,606	59	0	0	7	30	11,443	0	22,170
7	Jim Paschal	25,450	22	0	1	10	15	6,030	155	60,116
8	Larry Thomas	22,950	43	0	0	9	27	10,025	0	21,226
9	Buck Baker	22,366	35	0	2	15	18	7,263	159	43,781
10	Marvin Panch	21,480	31	5	3	18	21	6,499	648	34,836
11	Darel Dieringer	19,972	27	1	1	6	13	5,662	238	20,684
12	Wendell Scott	19,574	56	0	1	8	25	10,752	27	16,494
13	Fred Lorenzen	18,098	17	7	8	10	10	4,426	2375	73,859
14	Junior Johnson	17,066	29	5	3	12	15	6,298	1116	26,974
15	LeeRoy Yarbrough	16,172	34	0	2	11	15	5,896	200	16,629
16	Roy Tyner	13,922	46	0	0	0	17	7,327	0	11,488
17	Neil Castles	13,372	58	0	0	1	24	8,336	0	14,318
18	Bobby Isaac	13,252	20	0	1	5	7	3,163	134	26,733
19	Cale Yarborough	12,618	26	0	0	2	9	4,990	10	10,378
20	Tiny Lund	12,598	22	0	0	3	9	3,551	14	9,913
21	Doug Cooper	11,942	39	0	0	4	11	5,549	0	10,445
22	Paul Goldsmith	11,700	15	1	0	3	4	2,281	319	20,835
23	J. T. Putney	10,744	17	0	0	1	6	4,216	0	7,295
24	Larry Frank	10,314	12	0	0	0	3	1,483	0	7,830
25	Jack Anderson	10,040	32	0	0	1	4	4,402	0	8,510
26	G. C. Spencer	10,012	20	0	0	4	6	3,601	0	9,490
27	Fireball Roberts	9,900	10	0	1	5	6	1,702	17	28,345
28	Rex White	8,222	6	0	0	2	3	1,444	27	12,310
29	Dave MacDonald	7,650	5	0	0	1	3	661	0	9,195
30	Worth McMillion	7,586	18	0	0	0	6	4,681	0	4,710
31	Buddy Baker	7,314	33	0	0	3	7	3,239	0	8,460
32	Bunkie Blackburn	7,264	14	0	0	1	4	2,295	0	6,630
33	Bill McMahan	7,240	20	0	0	1	4	4,134	0	7,205
34	Buddy Arrington	6,364	28	0	0	2	9	5,172	0	5,315
35	Earl Balmer	6,170	10	0	0	2	4	2,771	1	5,795
36	Bob Derrington	5,896	18	0	0	0	2	1,897	1	3,580
37	Bobby Johns	5,436	12	0	0	0	2	1,806	0	5,700
38	E. J. Trivette	5,118	26	0	0	0	3	2,969	0	5,495
39	Doug Moore	4,970	24	0	0	0	6	3,894	0	5,175
40	Ken Spikes	4,934	6	0	0	0	1	1,018	0	3,100
41	Earl Brooks	4,820	29	0	0	0	8	3,988	0	3,925
42	Elmo Langley	4,400	14	0	0	0	5	2,739	0	3,905
43	Roy Mayne	4,278	14	0	0	1	2	2,207	0	4,705
44	Gene Hobby	4,054	18	0	0	0	3	4,013	0	2,795
45	Doug Yates	3,778	16	1	0	3	7	2,573	9	3,340
46	Ralph Earnhardt	3,720	11	0	0	1	1	1,107	0	3,290
47	Bob Cooper	3,602	14	0	0	0	1	783	0	4,510
48	Joe Weatherly	3,132	5	0	0	2	3	768	84	5,290
49	Sam McQuagg	2,928	5	0	0	0	0	653	0	1,700
50	Bobby Keck	2,754	10	0	0	2	5	2,137	0	2,850
