= 1964 Capital City 300 =

Auto race held at Virginia State Fairgrounds in 1964

Race details
- Race 53 of 62 in the 1964 NASCAR Grand National Series season
- Layout of Richmond Speedway
- Date: September 14, 1964
- Official name: Capital City 300
- Location: Virginia State Fairgrounds, Richmond, Virginia
- Course: Permanent racing facility
- Course length: 0.872 km (0.542 miles)
- Distance: 300 laps, 150 mi (241 km)
- Weather: Mild with temperatures of 72 °F (22 °C); wind speeds of 15 miles per hour (24 km/h)
- Average speed: 66.89 miles per hour (107.65 km/h)

Pole position
Driver	Ned Jarrett	Bondy Long

Most laps led
Driver	Junior Johnson	Matthews Racing
- Laps: 117

Winner
No. 5	Cotton Owens	Owens Racing

Television in the United States
- Network: untelevised
- Announcers: none

The 1964 Capital City 300 was a NASCAR Grand National Series event that was held on September 14, 1964, at Virginia State Fairgrounds (now Richmond Raceway) in Richmond, Virginia. Notable drivers who appeared at this race were Elmo Langley, Wendell Scott, Tiny Lund, Roy Tyner, and Richard Petty.

There were 33 American-born drivers on the grid; no foreigners attempted to qualify for this racing event. Vehicles registered from this race varied in year models from 1962 to 1964. NASCAR team owners that were fortunate enough to afford the 1964 model of stock car vehicles found that their vehicles could exceed 175 miles per hour or 282 kilometres per hour in the right circumstances; bringing in an era of unlimited horsepower. Having this level of speed within the sanctioned NASCAR events brought forth many events in addition to tragedies throughout the year in addition to the remainder of the 1960s.

== Background ==
In 1953, Richmond International Raceway began hosting the Grand National Series with Lee Petty winning that first race in Richmond. The original track was paved in 1968. In 1988, the track was re-designed into its present D-shaped configuration

The name for the raceway complex was "Strawberry Hill" until the Virginia State Fairgrounds site was bought out in 1999 and renamed the "Richmond International Raceway".

== Race report ==
During this race, there were lead changes between Billy Wade, Junior Johnson, and Cotton Owens. The transition to purpose-built racecars began in the early 1960s and occurred gradually over that decade. Changes made to the sport by the late 1960s brought an end to the "strictly stock" vehicles of the 1950s.

300 laps were completed in more than two hours; with Cotton Owens defeating his employee David Pearson by only a lap. Pearson was 29 years old on the day that the race was held; he was considered to be on the prime of his career recording seven short track victories throughout the summer of 1964. At this time, Pearson was trying to swallow more than he could chew in his NASCAR career so Owens had to teach him a lesson in the pragmatic side of stock car racing. As Owens' last win in his NASCAR career, this event served to remind the spectators who watched this event that not even the biggest NASCAR superstars are totally immune to losing their optimal racing performance during their twilight years.

Ned Jarrett qualified for the pole position for this race with a top speed of 66.89 miles per hour (107.65 km/h). Meanwhile, the average speed of the race would be a mere 61.955 miles per hour (99.707 km/h). Two of the drivers who finished in the "top ten" (Jarrett and Junior Johnson) had problems with their engines during the later laps of the race. Doug Yates, then an independent driver/owner, finished in last-place due to an oil pressure issue on the first lap. Eleven notable crew chiefs participated in this race; including Bud Moore, Herman Beam, Banjo Matthews, Dale Inman and Jimmy Helms.

Individual track earnings for this event ranged from the winner's share of $2,400 ($24,332 when adjusted for inflation) to the last-place finisher's share of $150 ($1,521 when adjusted for inflation). The total prize purse was $12,535 ($127,085 when adjusted for inflation).

=== Qualifying ===
Grid	No.	Driver	Manufacturer	Owner
1	11	Ned Jarrett	'64 Ford	Bondy Long
2	1	Billy Wade	'64 Mercury	Bud Moore
3	5	Cotton Owens	'64 Dodge	Cotton Owens
4	27	Junior Johnson	'64 Ford	Banjo Matthews
5	45	Bobby Isaac	'63 Plymouth	Louis Weathersbee
6	16	Darel Dieringer	'64 Mercury	Bud Moore
7	32	Mark Hurley	'63 Ford	Dave Kent
8	43	Jim Paschal	'64 Plymouth	Petty Enterprises
9	6	David Pearson	'64 Dodge	Cotton Owens
10	41	Richard Petty	'64 Plymouth	Petty Enterprises

== Finishing order ==
Section reference:

1. Cotton Owens† (No. 5)
2. David Pearson† (No. 6)
3. Richard Petty (No. 41)
4. Larry Thomas† (No. 19)
5. Ned Jarrett* (No. 11)
6. Neil Castles (No. 88)
7. Roy Tyner† (No. 9)
8. Junior Johnson* (No. 27)
9. Mark Hurley (No. 32)
10. E.J. Trivette (No. 52)
11. Jimmy Pardue† (No. 54)
12. Buddy Arrington (No. 78)
13. Worth McMillion* (No. 83)
14. Billy Wade*† (No. 1)
15. Doug Cooper (No. 60)
16. Elmo Langley*† (No. 64)
17. Bobby Isaac*† (No. 45)
18. Darel Dieringer*† (No. 16)
19. Gene Hobby* (No. 99)
20. Roy Mayne*† (No. 09)
21. Wendell Scott*† (No. 34)
22. Jim Paschal*† (No. 43)
23. Curtis Crider* (No. 02)
24. Buck Baker*† (No. 3)
25. Jack Anderson* (No. 20)
26. Doug Moore* (No. 58)
27. Don Branson*† (No. 0)
28. Bob Cooper* (No. 61)
29. Joe Cote* (No. 01)
30. Steve Young* (No. 86)
31. Tiny Lund*† (No. 55)
32. Bob Derrington* (No. 68)
33. Doug Yates* (No. 72)

† signifies that the driver is known to be deceased
* Driver failed to finish race

== Timeline ==
Section reference:

- Start of race: Billy Wade started out with the pole position.
- Lap 10: Junior Johnson took over the lead from Billy Wade.
- Lap 11: Steve Young had problems dealing with his vehicle's oil line.
- Lap 15: Handling problems with the vehicle knocked Joe Cote out of the race.
- Lap 41: The rear end of Doug Cooper's vehicle came off in a dangerous manner.
- Lap 65: Don Branson had a terminal crash.
- Lap 66: Billy Wade took over the lead from Junior Johnson.
- Lap 67: Doug Moore had a terminal crash.
- Lap 99: Oil pressure issues managed to relegate Jack Anderson to the sidelines.
- Lap 101: The rear end of Buck Baker's vehicle came off in an unsafe manner.
- Lap 116: Jim Paschal's rear end endured enough damage to render his vehicle unsafe for further racing.
- Lap 132: Junior Johnson took over the lead from Billy Wade.
- Lap 159: Radiator problems managed to send Wendell Scott to the sidelines.
- Lap 170: Cotton Owens took over the lead from Junior Johnson.
- Lap 175: Roy Mayne's engine stopped working properly after racing at high speeds for a long period of time.
- Lap 182: Engine problems managed to destroy Darel Dieringer's chance at a respectable finish.
- Lap 188: Junior Johnson took over the lead from Cotton Owens.
- Lap 203: Billy Wade managed to blow his engine while he was racing.
- Lap 206: Worth McMillion would lose the rear end of his vehicle.
- Lap 223: Jimmie Pardue managed to lose the rear end of his vehicle, causing him to leave early for safety reasons.
- Lap 264: Junior Johnson had to leave the race due to engine problems.
- Lap 265: Cotton Owens took over the lead from Junior Johnson.
- Lap 280: Ned Jarrett's engine blew while he was racing.
- Finish: Cotton Owens was officially declared the winner of the event.

Preceded by 1964 Buddy Shuman 250	Grand National Series races 1964	Succeeded by 1964 untitled race at Old Dominion Speedway
