= Billy Wade (racing driver) =

American racing driver

- Born: Billy Drew Wade; February 28, 1930; Houston, Texas, U.S.
- Died: January 5, 1965 (aged 34); Daytona Beach, Florida, U.S.
- Cause of death: Injuries from racing accident
- Awards: 1963 NASCAR Rookie of the Year

NASCAR Cup Series career
- 70 races run over 3 years
- Best finish: 4th (1964)
- First race: 1962 Daytona 500 (Daytona)
- Last race: 1964 Jaycee 300 (Augusta Speedway)
- First win: 1964 Fireball Roberts 200 (Old Bridge Stadium)
- Last win: 1964 The Glen 151.8 (Watkins Glen)
Wins	Top tens	Poles
4	41	5

Billy Drew Wade (February 28, 1930 – January 5, 1965) was an American stock car racing driver.

== Career ==
Wade was the 1963 NASCAR Rookie of the Year for car owner Cotton Owens. He finished the season with 14 Top 10 finishes in 31 races. He won four consecutive races the following year for Bud Moore Engineering between July 10 and July 19, 1964. The four wins give Wade the sole distinction of being the only driver to accomplish this feat with victories at Old Bridge Stadium on July 10, the road course at Bridgehampton, N.Y on the 12th, a July 15 win at Islip Speedway in New York, and his fourth (and final) win at Watkins Glen. Dick Linder also followed his first victory at Dayton with a win at Hamburg; but Wade is the only driver to string four victories in a row once he got his first. He also accumulated five poles and 25 top-ten finishes in his 35 starts. As of 2025, he is the most recent driver in NASCAR to get his first pole and win in the same weekend.

On January 5, 1965, Wade was performing a tire test at Daytona International Speedway, when a tire blowout caused his car to crash in the west turn, killing the 34-year-old Texan.

== Motorsports career results ==
=== NASCAR ===
==== Grand National Series ====
NASCAR Grand National Series results
Year	Team/Owner	No.	Make	1	2	3	4	5	6	7	8	9	10	11	12	13	14	15	16	17	18	19	20	21	22	23	24	25	26	27	28	29	30	31	32	33	34	35	36	37	38	39	40	41	42	43	44	45	46	47	48	49	50	51	52	53	54	55	56	57	58	59	60	61	62	NGNC	Pts	Ref
1962	Luther Costales	01	Ford	CON	AWS	DAY	DAY	DAY; 18	CON	AWS	SVH	HBO	RCH	CLB																																																				46th	2,008	
1962	James Turner	24	Pontiac												NWS; 10	GPS	MBS	MAR; 8	BOW; 19	BRI	RCH	HCY	CON	DAR	PIF	CLT	ATL	BGS	AUG	RCH	SBO	DAY	CLB	ASH	GPS	AUG	SVH	MBS	BRI	CHT	NSV	HUN	AWS	STR	BGS	PIF	VAL	DAR	HCY	RCH	DTS	AUG	MAR	NWS	CLT	ATL										46th	2,008	
1963	Cotton Owens	5	Dodge	BIR	GGS	THS	RIV; 7	DAY; 29	DAY	DAY; 41	PIF; 16	AWS; 7	HBO			BRI; 8	AUG	RCH; 4	GRE; 10	SBO; 13		MAR; 7	NWS; 9	CLB	THS	DAR; 10	ODS	RCH	CLT; 24	BIR	ATL; 8	DAY; 19	MBS	SVH	DTS				BRD; 12	BRI; 13	GRE; 18	FAI; 2	COL; 6	AWS; 5	SPR; 4	BGS	ONA	DAR; 28	HCY	RCH	MAR; 6	DTS	NWS	THS	CLT; 33	SBO; 19	OCC; 21	RIV; 33								16th	14,646	
1963	Cotton Owens	6	Dodge											ATL; 13	HCY																																																			16th	14,646	
1963	Bill Church	0	Chevy																		BOW; 15																																													16th	14,646	
1963	Mark Hurley	61	Ford																																	BOW; 23	ASH	OBS																												16th	14,646	
1964	Cotton Owens	6	Dodge	CON; 15																																																														4th	28,474	
1964	Cotton Owens	5	Dodge		AUG; 3	JAC; 10	SVH																																																											4th	28,474	
1964	Rex White	4	Mercury					RIV; 13																																																										4th	28,474	
1964	Bud Moore Engineering	1	Mercury						DAY; 10	DAY	DAY; 6	RCH; 3	BRI; 10	GPS	BGS	ATL; 12	AWS; 3	HBO	PIF; 6*	COL; 4	NWS; 8	MAR; 33	SVH	DAR; 7	LGY	HCY	SBO	CLT; 5	GPS	ASH	ATL; 8	CON	NSV	CHT	BIR; 3	VAL	PIF; 6	DAY; 20	ODS	OBS; 1	BRD; 1	ISL; 1*	GLN; 1*	LIN	BRI; 22	NSV; 19	MBS	AWS; 26	DTS	HUN; 6	COL; 10	BGS	STR	DAR; 6	HCY	RCH; 14	ODS	HBO	MAR; 9	SVH	NWS; 4	CLT; 37	HAR; 16	AUG; 4	JAC	4th	28,474	
