= Doug Wilson (racing driver) =

Racecar driver from North Carolina

- Born: Greensboro, North Carolina, U.S.

NASCAR Cup Series career
- 4 races run over 1 year
- Best finish: 88th - 1964 NASCAR Grand National Series season
- First race: 1964 Volunteer 500 (Bristol International Speedway)
- Last race: 1964 Old Dominion 500 (Martinsville Speedway)
Wins	Top tens	Poles
0	0	0

Doug Wilson is an American former NASCAR Grand National Series race car driver who drove 1086 laps in his entire NASCAR career - for a distance of 523.0 miles (841.7 km). His total earnings as a driver were $750 ($4,243.42 when inflation is taken into effect) while starting 27th on average and finishing 21st on average. Wilson mainly drove the No. 48 Ford machine for Mr. W.S. Jenkins.
