= Mark Hurley =

American racecar driver (1935–2006)

- Born: December 12, 1935; Johnson City, Tennessee, U.S.
- Died: March 25, 2006 (aged 70); Jonesborough, Tennessee, U.S.

NASCAR Cup Series career
- 16 races run over 4 years
- Best finish: 71st - 1964 Grand National season
- First race: 1961 Buddy Shuman 250 (Hickory Speedway)
- Last race: 1964 Wilkes 400 (North Wilkesboro Speedway)
Wins	Top tens	Poles
0	2	0

Harry Mark Hurley (December 12, 1935 – March 25, 2006) was an American NASCAR Grand National Series driver. He has raced in NASCAR for four years and has competed in 16 races with one finish in the top-five and two finishes in the top-ten. Hurley has accomplished 2,263 laps of racing to accumulate a career earnings total of $2,630 ($27,301.77 when adjusted for inflation). The average career start for this driver would be 18th while the average career finish would be 19th place. Hurley was a car owner for three races (driving a 1963 Ford Galaxie) before selling his ride. He died after a brief illness in Jonesborough, Tennessee on March 25, 2006, at the age of 70.
