= 1965 NASCAR Grand National Series =

American motorsport season

1965 Grand National Series

Seasons
- ← 1964 1966 →

The 1965 NASCAR Grand National Series was the seventeenth season of the premier Grand National Series stock car racing championship sanctioned by NASCAR. Due to the no availability of the Hemi, GM "Mystery Motor" and Ford overhead cam 427, NASCAR banned those non-production engines. Chrysler responded by withdrawing their support, and drivers Richard Petty, David Pearson, Paul Goldsmith, Bobby Isaac until the Chrysler HEMI had sold 500 units in production vehicles, meeting NASCAR's homologation standards of 500 units. Driver Ned Jarrett won the Grand National Drivers Championship after winning 13 of the 54 races he competed in, he clinched the title with 3 races remaining in the season after finishing 5th in the National 400 from Charlotte Motor Speedway. Ford won the Manufacturers Championship again.

The newly built Rockingham Speedway opened in 1965, and Curtis Turner returned from his ban to win the inaugural race in his Ford. Turner had been banned from NASCAR in 1961 by Bill France Sr. for trying to organize a drivers' union with the Teamsters.

== Schedule ==
No.	Race title	Track	Date
1	Motor Trend 500	Riverside International Raceway, Riverside	January 17
2	100-mile qualifying races	Daytona International Speedway, Daytona Beach	February 12
3	100-mile qualifying races	Daytona International Speedway, Daytona Beach	February 12
4	Daytona 500	Daytona International Speedway, Daytona Beach	February 14
5	1965-05	Piedmont Interstate Fairgrounds, Spartanburg	February 27
6	Fireball 200	Asheville-Weaverville Speedway, Weaverville	February 28
7	Richmond 250	Atlantic Rural Fairgrounds, Richmond	March 7
8	1965-08	Orange Speedway, Hillsborough	March 14
9	Atlanta 500	Atlanta International Raceway, Hampton	April 11
10	Greenville 200	Greenville-Pickens Speedway, Greenville	April 17
11	Gwyn Staley 400	North Wilkesboro Speedway, North Wilkesboro	April 18
12	Virginia 500	Martinsville Speedway, Ridgeway	April 25
13	Columbia 200	Columbia Speedway, Columbia	April 28
14	Southeastern 500	Bristol International Speedway, Bristol	May 2
15	Rebel 300	Darlington Raceway, Darlington	May 8
16	Tidewater 250	Langley Speedway, Hampton	May 14
17	1965-17	Bowman Gray Stadium, Winston-Salem	May 15
18	Hickory 250	Hickory Speedway, Hickory	May 16
19	World 600	Charlotte Motor Speedway, Concord	May 23
20	1965-20	Cleveland County Fairgrounds, Shelby	May 27
21	1965-21	New Asheville Speedway, Asheville	May 29
22	1965-22	Harris Speedway, Harris	May 30
23	Music City 200	Nashville Speedway, Nashville	June 3
24	Birmingham 200	Fairgrounds Raceway, Birmingham	June 6
25	Dixie 400	Atlanta International Raceway, Hampton	June 13
26	Pickens 200	Greenville-Pickens Speedway, Greenville	June 19
27	1965-27	Rambi Raceway, Myrtle Beach	June 24
28	1965-28	Valdosta 75 Speedway, Valdosta	June 27
29	Firecracker 400	Daytona International Speedway, Daytona Beach	July 4
30	1965-30	Old Dominion Speedway, Manassas	July 8
31	Old Bridge 200	Old Bridge Stadium, Old Bridge	July 9
32	1965-32	Islip Speedway, Islip	July 14
33	The Glen 151.8	Watkins Glen International, Watkins Glen	July 18
34	Volunteer 500	Bristol International Speedway, Bristol	July 25
35	Nashville 400	Nashville Speedway, Nashville	July 31
36	1965-36	Cleveland County Fairgrounds, Shelby	August 5
37	Western North Carolina 500	Asheville-Weaverville Speedway, Weaverville	August 8
38	1965-38	Smoky Mountain Raceway, Maryville	August 13
39	1965-39	Piedmont Interstate Fairgrounds, Spartanburg	August 14
40	1965-40	Augusta Speedway, Augusta	August 15
41	Sandlapper 200	Columbia Speedway, Columbia	August 19
42	Moyock 300	Dog Track Speedway, Moyock	August 24
43	1965-43	Beltsville Speedway, Beltsville	August 25
44	Myers Brothers 250	Bowman Gray Stadium, Winston-Salem	August 28
45	Southern 500	Darlington Raceway, Darlington	September 6
46	Buddy Shuman 250	Hickory Speedway, Hickory	September 10
47	Pennsylvania 200	Lincoln Speedway, New Oxford	September 14
48	1965-48	Old Dominion Speedway, Manassas	September 17
49	Capital City 300	Atlantic Rural Fairgrounds, Richmond	September 18
50	Old Dominion 500	Martinsville Speedway, Ridgeway	September 26
51	Wilkes 400	North Wilkesboro Speedway, North Wilkesboro	October 3
52	National 400	Charlotte Motor Speedway, Concord	October 17
53	1965-53	Orange Speedway, Hillsborough	October 24
54	American 500	North Carolina Motor Speedway, Rockingham	October 31
55	Tidewater 300	Dog Track Speedway, Moyock	November 7

== Expansion ==
- Fords had won 34 races before NASCAR adjusted the rules to allow the Chryslers to compete, but it was too late in the 55 event season for them to mount a championship challenge.

== Bibliography ==
- Fleischman, Bill; Pearce, Al (2004). "At A Glance: Year-by-Year Summaries; 1965". The Unauthorized NASCAR Fan Guide: 2004. Vol. 2004 (10 ed.). Canton, MI: Checkered Flag Press; Visible Ink Press. pp. 152, 153 of 576. ISBN 0-681-27587-1.
