= 1964 Nashville 400 =

Auto race held at Music City Motorplex in 1964

Race details
- Race 43 of 62 in the 1964 NASCAR Grand National Series season
- Date: August 2, 1964
- Official name: Nashville 400
- Location: Music City Motorplex, Nashville, Tennessee
- Course: Permanent racing facility
- Course length: 0.500 miles (0.804 km)
- Distance: 400 laps, 200.0 mi (321.8 km)
- Weather: Extremely hot with temperatures of 93.0 °F (33.9 °C); wind speeds of 12 miles per hour (19 km/h)
- Average speed: 73.208 miles per hour (117.817 km/h)

Pole position
Driver	Richard Petty	Petty Enterprises

Most laps led
Driver	Richard Petty	Petty Enterprises
- Laps: 400

Winner
No. 87	Richard Petty	Petty Enterprises

Television in the United States
- Network: untelevised
- Announcers: none

The 1964 Nashville 400 was a NASCAR Grand National Series event that was held on August 2, 1964, at Nashville Speedway (now Fairgrounds Speedway) in Nashville, Tennessee.

== Background ==
Nashville Speedway was converted to a half-mile paved oval in 1957, when it began to be a NASCAR series track.

== Race report ==
Four hundred laps took place on a paved oval track spanning 0.500 miles (0.805 km) for a grand total of 200.0 miles (321.9 km). It took two hours, forty-three minutes, and fifty-five seconds for the race to reach its conclusion; Richard Petty was the winner of the race.

Notable crew chiefs for the race were Jimmy Helms, Dale Inman, Wendell Scott, and Herman Beam.

Three cautions were drawn for twenty-six laps in front of 13,128 people. Notable speeds were: 73.208 miles per hour (117.817 km/h) for the average speed and 80.826 miles per hour (130.077 km/h) for the pole position speed. This would be Bud Moore's first official NASCAR Cup Series race. Total winnings for this race were $9,380 in American dollars ($95,098 when adjusted for inflation). Richard Petty would end up receiving the majority of the winnings with a grand total of $2,150 ($21,798 when adjusted for inflation).

The transition to purpose-built racecars began in the early 1960s and occurred gradually over that decade. Changes made to the sport by the late 1960s brought an end to the "strictly stock" vehicles of the 1950s.

=== Qualifying ===
Grid	No.	Driver	Manufacturer
1	43	Richard Petty	'64 Plymouth
2	1	Billy Wade	'64 Mercury
3	41	Jim Paschal	'64 Plymouth
4	11	Ned Jarrett	'64 Ford
5	6	David Pearson	'64 Dodge
6	5	Earl Balmer	'64 Dodge
7	16	Darel Dieringer	'64 Mercury
8	54	Jimmy Pardue	'64 Plymouth
9	19	Larry Thomas	'64 Ford
10	82	Bunkie Blackburn	'63 Pontiac
11	42	Bill McMahan	'64 Pontiac
12	34	Wendell Scott	'63 Ford
13	78	Buddy Arrington	'63 Dodge
14	49	Doug Moore	'64 Chevrolet
15	88	Neil Castles	'62 Chrysler
16	9	Roy Tyner	'64 Chevrolet
17	20	Jack Anderson	'64 Ford
18	60	Doug Cooper	'63 Ford
19	52	E.J. Trivette	'62 Chevrolet
20	02	Curtis Crider	'63 Mercury
21	32	Mark Hurley	'63 Ford
22	01	Chuck Huckabee	'63 Mercury
23	17	Junior Spencer	'64 Ford
24	92	Rodney Bottinger	'64 Ford
25	86	Steve Young	'62 Chrysler
26	66	Bud Moore	'63 Ford
27	81	Henley Gray	'64 Ford

== Finishing order ==
Section reference:

1. Richard Petty (No. 43)
2. Jim Paschal† (No. 31)
3. David Pearson† (No. 6)
4. Earl Balmer (No. 5)
5. Ned Jarrett (No. 11)
6. Darel Dieringer† (No. 16)
7. Larry Thomas† (No. 19)
8. Jimmy Pardue† (No. 54)
9. Doug Moore (No. 49)
10. Neil Castles (No. 88)
11. Bill McMahan (No. 42)
12. Curtis Crider† (No. 02)
13. Jack Anderson (No. 20)
14. E.J. Trivette (No. 52)
15. Junior Spencer* (No. 81)
16. Wendell Scott*† (No. 34)
17. Roy Tyner*† (No. 9)
18. Bunkie Blackburn*† (No. 82)
19. Billy Wade*† (No. 1)
20. Henley Gray* (No. 81)
21. Doug Cooper* (No. 60)
22. Mark Hurley* (No. 32)
23. Buddy Arrington* (No. 78)
24. Rodney Bottinger* (No. 92)
25. Chuck Huckabee* (No. 01)
26. Steve Young* (No. 86)
27. Bud Moore* (No. 66)

* Driver failed to finish race
† signifies that the driver is known to be deceased

Preceded by 1964 Volunteer 500	NASCAR Grand National Races; 1964	Succeeded by 1964 untitled race at Rambi Raceway
