= 1964 Wilkes 400 =

Auto race held at North Wilkesboro Speedway in 1964

Race details
- Race 58 of 62 in the 1964 NASCAR Grand National Series season
- North Wilkesboro Speedway
- Date: October 11, 1964
- Official name: Wilkes 400
- Location: North Wilkesboro Speedway, North Wilkesboro, North Carolina
- Course: Permanent racing facility
- Course length: 0.625 miles (1.005 km)
- Distance: 400 laps, 250 mi (402 km)
- Weather: Cold with temperatures of 60.1 °F (15.6 °C); wind speeds of 8.9 miles per hour (14.3 km/h)
- Average speed: 91.398 miles per hour (147.091 km/h)
- Attendance: 12,000

Pole position
Driver	Junior Johnson	Banjo Matthews
- Time: 22.330

Most laps led
Driver	Junior Johnson	Banjo Matthews
- Laps: 201

Winner
No. 21	Marvin Panch	Wood Brothers

Television in the United States
- Network: untelevised
- Announcers: none

The 1964 Wilkes 400 was a NASCAR Grand National Series event that was held on October 11, 1964, at North Wilkesboro Speedway in North Wilkesboro, North Carolina.

== Background ==
Through the 1960s and 1970s the NASCAR Grand National Series began focusing on bigger, faster, and longer tracks. Like other short tracks in NASCAR at the time, crowd capacity and purses were small compared to the larger tracks. Over time, Enoch Staley and Jack Combs attempted to keep the facility modern and on pace with the growth of the sport. The West Grandstand was rebuilt with chair-type seats rather than the old bare concrete slabs. New larger restroom facilities were built, and the South Grandstand was expanded. A garage facility was also built within the track, which at the time was rare for short-track venues. But the main focus was on keeping ticket prices affordable. Food and beverage prices were kept low, and event parking and camping were always free. As long as profits covered maintenance costs, Staley was satisfied with the income of the track.

In the Gwyn Staley 160 of 1960, Junior Johnson beat 21 other drivers for the pole position with a lap speed of 83.860 mph. Glen Wood overtook Johnson to lead the first lap, but Johnson had the race under control and led the next 145 laps. Lee Petty moved up from the eighth starting position to challenge Johnson late in the race. With 14 laps remaining, Johnson and Petty made contact. Johnson's car was sent spinning into the guardrail. Petty lead the final 14 laps to win his third straight race at North Wilkesboro. The crowd of 9,200 pelted Petty with bottles, rocks, and debris after his win; he had done their local hero wrong. When Petty took the microphone in Victory Lane to explain his side of the story, the crowd began jeering. Rex White finished second, and Wood placed third. Ned Jarrett finished fourth under the alias John Lentz.

The length of the fall race in 1960 was increased from its usual 160 laps / 100 miles to 320 laps / 200 miles, this it became known as the Wilkes 320. Speeds increased immensely from the previous record, 1.83 seconds quicker than any previous qualifying lap (86.806 to 93.399 mph). Rex White posted the fastest qualifying lap and dethroned Lee Petty from his three-race winning streak at North Wilkesboro. Junior Johnson finished about half a lap behind White in second place.

In the 1961 running of the Gwyn Staley 400, Junior Johnson recorded another pole, this time by 0.57 seconds better than the previous track record, with his qualifying time of 23.52 (95.660 mph). Johnson led all of the 62 laps he ran before transmission problems forced him out of the race. Fred Lorenzen led the next 61 laps until engine problems took him out of the running. And Curtis Turner led 56 laps before experiencing problems as well. 1960 Grand National Champion Rex White, who started on the outside pole, led the remaining 221 laps and won the race. Tommy Irwin started the race in sixth position and finished the Gwyn Staley 400 two laps behind White. Richard Petty followed in third place. Fireball Roberts, in a Pontiac owned by Smokey Yunick, finished fourth (ten laps down), and Johnny Allen, who crashed out of the race on his 387th lap, still finished in fifth place. Only 12 of the 25 cars that entered the race were running at the finish of the first 400-lap edition of the Gwyn Staley race.

In the 1963 Wilkes 400, Fred Lorenzen captured his third straight pole at the track by breaking his own record with a lap time of 23.30 seconds / 96.566 mph. Richard Petty entered the race in an attempt to become the first driver to win four consecutive races at North Wilkesboro. But he experienced engine problems and lasted only 45 laps into the race. Lorenzen led 58 laps, but came up short of victory, six seconds behind winner Marvin Panch. Panch did not start the 1963 season until halfway through because he had nearly lost his life in a crash while testing a Maserati at Daytona that February. Panch, in a Wood Brothers car, started third and led 131 laps in the race. Holman-Moody took the next three spots in the final rundown, with Lorenzen second, Nelson Stacy third, and Fireball Roberts fourth. Stacy started fourth and led 56 laps, while Roberts started from the outside pole and led the most laps with 155.

== Race report ==
This race took two hours and forty-four minutes to successfully complete with stock cars reaching speeds of 91.398 miles per hour (147.091 km/h). Marvin Panch managed to defeat Fred Lorenzen by a time of 5.8 seconds; Fred Lorenzen was leading until he had to pit for gas 25 laps from the end of the race and Marvin Panch took the lead for good. Two cautions were given for 28 laps in front of twelve thousand live spectators. Junior Johnson qualified for the pole position for this race with a solo speed of 100.761 miles per hour (162.159 km/h). Buddy Arrington and Doug Cooper failed to make any prize winnings for their respective 31st and 32nd-place finishes. They crashed into each other at lap 2 of the 400-lap race.

Mark Hurley would retire from the NASCAR Grand National Series after the conclusion of this event; taking his 1963 Ford Galaxie to its final 400 miles of racing action. The winner would walk away with a grand total of $3,225 in winnings ($33,478 when adjusted for inflation) while the bottom two finishers walked away with nothing.

Notable crew chiefs who actively participated in this race were Jimmy Helms, Dale Inman, Herb Nab, Banjo Matthews, Glen Wood, Herman Beam, Bud Moore among others.

The transition to purpose-built racecars began in the early 1960s and occurred gradually over that decade. Changes made to the sport by the late 1960s brought an end to the "strictly stock" vehicles of the 1950s.

=== Qualifying ===
Grid	No.	Driver	Manufacturer	Qualifying time	Speed	Owner
1	27	Junior Johnson	'64 Ford	22.330	100.761	Banjo Matthews
2	6	David Pearson	'64 Dodge	22.359	100.630	Cotton Owens
3	43	Richard Petty	'64 Plymouth	22.384	100.520	Petty Enterprises
4	28	Fred Lorenzen	'64 Ford	22.390	100.490	Holman-Moody
5	21	Marvin Panch	'64 Ford	22.419	100.360	Wood Brothers
6	41	Jim Paschal	'64 Plymouth	22.451	100.220	Petty Enterprises
7	11	Ned Jarrett	'64 Ford	22.509	99.960	Bondy Long
8	16	Darel Dieringer	'64 Mercury	22.527	99.880	Bud Moore
9	00	Cale Yarborough	'64 Ford	22.611	99.510	Holman-Moody
10	3	Buck Baker	'64 Dodge	22.620	99.470	Ray Fox

Failed to qualify: Terry Murchison (#13)
Withdrew from race: Paul Goldsmith (#25), Bobby Isaac (#26), Possum Jones (#31), Marshall Sargent (#89)

== Finishing order ==
Section reference:

1. Marvin Panch (No. 21)
2. Fred Lorenzen (No. 28)
3. Darel Dieringer (No. 16)
4. Billy Wade (No. 1)
5. Buck Baker (No. 3)
6. Cale Yarborough (No. 00)
7. Curtis Crider (No. 02)
8. Larry Thomas (No. 19)
9. Neil Castles (No. 88)
10. Bobby Johns (No. 7)
11. Jack Anderson (No. 32)
12. Roy Tyner (No. 9)
13. Junior Johnson (No. 27)
14. Wendell Scott (No. 34)
15. Doug Yates (No. 72)
16. Pete Stewart (No. 53)
17. David Pearson (No. 6)
18. Earl Balmer (No. 5)
19. Richard Petty (No. 43)
20. J.T. Putney (No. 46)
21. Jim Paschal (No. 41)
22. Buddy Baker (No. 10)
23. Darrell Bryant (No. 01)
24. Larry Manning (No. 0)
25. Doug Moore (No. 58)
26. Paul Lewis (No. 52)
27. Earl Brooks (No. 55)
28. Bill Whitley (No. 97)
29. Ned Jarrett (No. 11)
30. Mark Hurley (No. 20)
31. Buddy Arrington (No. 78)
32. Doug Cooper (No. 60)

== Timeline ==
Section reference:

- Start: Junior Johnson was leading the rest of the starting grid as the green flag was waved in the air.
- Lap 2: Buddy Arrington and Doug Cooper were involved in a terminal crash.
- Lap 3: Mark Hurley managed to blow his engine.
- Lap 5: Ned Jarrett ran out of fuel while racing.
- Lap 22: Bill Whitley's tires were rubbing hard against the vehicle.
- Lap 26: The rear end came loose off of Earl Brooks' vehicle.
- Lap 27: Paul Lewis managed to overheat his vehicle.
- Lap 36: The fuel line on Doug Moore's vehicle stopped working in a proper manner.
- Lap 38: Larry Manning's vehicle developed some issues in the brakes.
- Lap 48: Darrell Bryant's vehicle suddenly developed transmission issues.
- Lap 51: Buddy Baker managed to blow his engine.
- Lap 87: Jim Paschal managed to blow his engine.
- Lap 92: Darel Dieringer took over the lead from Junior Johnson.
- Lap 94: Junior Johnson took over the lead from Darel Dieringer.
- Lap 125: The driveshaft of J.T. Putney's vehicle developed problems.
- Lap 153: The rear end came loose off of Richard Petty's vehicle.
- Lap 195: Fred Lorenzen took over the lead from Junior Johnson.
- Lap 200: A wheel bearing came off of Earl Balmer's vehicle.
- Lap 205: A head gasket was giving David Pearson some issues.
- Lap 208: The rear end came off of Pete Stewart's vehicle.
- Lap 246: Junior Johnson took over the lead from Fred Lorenzen.
- Lap 252: Marvin Panch took over the lead from Junior Johnson.
- Lap 294: Wendell Scott managed to blow his engine.
- Lap 295: Junior Johnson took over the lead from Marvin Panch.
- Lap 297: Junior Johnson managed to blow his engine.
- Lap 298: Marvin Panch took over the lead from Junior Johnson.
- Lap 304: Fred Lorenzen took over the lead from Marvin Panch.
- Lap 348: The rear end came off of Bobby Johns' vehicle.
- Lap 376: Marvin Panch took over the lead from Fred Lorenzen.
- Finish: Marvin Panch was officially declared the winner of the event.

Preceded by 1964 untitled race at Savannah Speedway	NASCAR Grand National Series Season; 1964	Succeeded by 1964 National 400

Preceded by 1963	Wilkes 400 races 1964	Succeeded by 1965
