= 1964 The Glen 151.8 =

Auto race held at Watkins Glen International in 1964

Race details
- Race 40 of 62 in the 1964 NASCAR Grand National Series season
- Watkins Glen; modified version to represent the circuit from 1956-1970
- Date: July 19, 1964
- Official name: The Glen 151.8
- Location: Watkins Glen International, Watkins Glen, New York
- Course: Permanent racing facility
- Course length: 2.300 miles (3.701 km)
- Distance: 66 laps, 151.8 mi (244.2 km)
- Weather: Hot with temperatures of 88 °F (31 °C); wind speeds of 13 miles per hour (21 km/h)
- Average speed: 97.998 miles per hour (157.712 km/h)
- Attendance: 10,000

Pole position
Driver	Billy Wade	Bud Moore

Most laps led
Driver	Billy Wade	Bud Moore
- Laps: 41

Winner
No. 1	Billy Wade	Bud Moore

Television in the United States
- Network: untelevised
- Announcers: none

The 1964 The Glen 151.8 was a NASCAR Grand National Series event that was held on July 19, 1964, at Watkins Glen International in Watkins Glen, New York.

== Background ==
Watkins Glen International, nicknamed "The Glen", is a race track located in Watkins Glen, New York, at the southern tip of Seneca Lake. The sports car racing facility is owned by the International Speedway Corporation. It was long known around the world as the home of the United States Grand Prix, which it hosted for 20 consecutive years (1961–1980) but since 1948, it has been home to road racing of nearly every class, such as Formula One, the World Sportscar Championship, Trans-Am, Can-Am, the NASCAR Cup Series, the International Motor Sports Association and the IndyCar Series. Initially, public roads in the village were used for the race course. In 1956, a permanent circuit for the race was built. The circuit's current layout has more/less been the same since 1971, although a chicane was installed at the uphill esses in 1975 to slow cars through these corners, where there was a fatality during practice at the 1973 United States Grand Prix. The chicane was removed in 1985, but another chicane called the "Inner Loop" was installed in 1992 after a fatal accident during the previous year's NASCAR Winston Cup event. The circuit is known as the Mecca of North American road racing and is a very popular venue among fans and drivers.

== Race report ==
Five lead changes were made (consisting of Ned Jarrett, Darel Dieringer, Billy Wade, and Ned Jarrett). After one hour and thirty-two minutes of racing, Billy Wade managed to defeat LeeRoy Yarbrough by six seconds in front of 10,000 live spectators (approximately 24% of the racetrack's modern capacity). The total prize purse handed out for this racing event was $6,395 ($66,386 when inflation is taken into effect); Billy Wade received $1,400 of it ($14,533 when inflation is taken into effect) while Lee Petty received a meager $150 ($1,557 when inflation is taken into effect).

Pete Boland would receive the last-place finish due to a brake problem on lap 2 of 66. The actual race spanned for 151.8 miles (244.3 km); with the pole position speed at 102.222 miles per hour (164.510 km/h) and the average race speed at 97.988 miles per hour (157.696 km/h). Lee Petty would retire from NASCAR after this race. From the next race onward, his son Richard would race alone. Bob Welborn would make his second-to-last NASCAR appearance at this racing event. Walt Hansgen would become the first road course ringer by being at this track three times. He would drive a 1964 Chevrolet Chevelle during this race after driving a Ford vehicle at a previous race.

Some of the more notable crew chiefs were Bud Moore, Mario Rossi, Louis Clements, Dale Inman, Vic Ballard and Jimmy Helms.

The transition to purpose-built racecars began in the early 1960s and occurred gradually over that decade. Changes made to the sport by the late 1960s brought an end to the "strictly stock" vehicles of the 1950s.

=== Qualifying ===
Grid	No.	Driver	Manufacturer	Owner
1	1	Billy Wade	'64 Mercury	Bud Moore
2	11	Ned Jarrett	'64 Ford	Bondy Long
3	25	Paul Goldsmith	'64 Plymouth	Ray Nichels
4	43	Richard Petty	'64 Plymouth	Petty Enterprises
5	6	David Pearson	'64 Dodge	Cotton Owens
6	16	Darel Dieringer	'64 Mercury	Bud Moore
7	54	Jimmy Pardue	'64 Plymouth	Charles Robinson
8	03	LeeRoy Yarbrough	'64 Dodge	Ray Fox
9	3	Buck Baker	'64 Dodge	Ray Fox
10	46	Walt Hansgen	'64 Ford	Walt Hansgen

=== Finishing order ===
1. Billy Wade† (#1)
2. LeeRoy Yarbrough† (#03)
3. Walt Hansgen† (#46)
4. Buck Baker† (#3)
5. Bob Welborn† (#06)
6. David Pearson† (#6)
7. Jimmy Pardue*† (#54)
8. Ned Jarrett* (#11)
9. Curtis Crider† (#02)
10. Doug Cooper† (#60)
11. Louis Weathersbee (#45)
12. Wendell Scott† (#34)
13. Doug Moore (#49)
14. Darel Dieringer*† (#16)
15. Roy Tyner† (#9)
16. Earl Brooks*† (#55)
17. Neil Castles*† (#88)
18. Bob Derrington*† (#68)
19. Bernard Alvarez* (#10)
20. Paul Goldsmith* (#25)
21. Richard Petty* (#43)
22. Lee Petty*† (#41)
23. Al White* (#31)
24. Marvin Panch*† (#71)
25. Frank Tanner* (#66)
26. Pete Boland* (#01)

† signifies that the driver is known to be deceased
* Driver failed to finish race

== Timeline ==
Section reference:

- Start of race: Billy Wade started the race with the pole position, but was quickly overtaken by Ned Jarrett.
- Lap 2: Pete Boland's faulty brakes made him the last-place finisher of the event; Frank Tanner could no longer handle his racing vehicle in a safe manner.
- Lap 3: Marvin Panch had troubles handling his vehicle, causing him to exit the race early.
- Lap 5: The rear end fell off of Al White's vehicle, ending his race day too soon.
- Lap 7: Darel Dieringer took over the lead from Ned Jarrett.
- Lap 9: Lee Petty's vehicle could not handle properly, causing his untimely exit.
- Lap 10: Richard Petty had a terminal crash, forcing him to leave the race prematurely.
- Lap 13: Oil pressure issues got the best of Paul Goldsmith.
- Lap 15: Billy Wade took over the lead from Darel Dieringer.
- Lap 25: Problems with the vehicle's shift lever forced Bernard Alvarez out of contention.
- Lap 26: Overheating issues forced Bob Derrington off the track.
- Lap 28: Ned Jarrett took over the lead from Billy Wade.
- Lap 33: The rear window of Neil Castles' vehicle fell off, forcing him to exit the race.
- Lap 35: Earl Brooks' steering problem forced him to leave the race.
- Lap 36: Billy Wade took over the lead from Ned Jarrett.
- Lap 49: Darel Dieringer notice his engine wasn't working properly anymore, forcing him to withdraw from the race.
- Lap 58: Ned Jarrett managed to blow his engine while racing.
- Lap 59: Jimmy Pardue blew his engine.
- Finish: Billy Wade was officially declared the winner of the event.

Preceded by 1964 untitled race at Islip Speedway	NASCAR Grand National Series Season; 1964	Succeeded by 1964 Pennsylvania 200
