= 1964 Old Dominion 500 =

Auto race held at Martinsville Speedway in 1964

Race details
- Race 56 of 62 in the 1964 NASCAR Grand National Series season
- A map showing the layout of Martinsville Speedway
- Date: September 24, 1964
- Official name: Old Dominion 500
- Location: Martinsville Speedway, Martinsville, Virginia
- Course: Permanent racing facility
- Course length: 0.525 miles (0.844 km)
- Distance: 500 laps, 262.5 mi (442.4 km)
- Weather: Warm with temperatures of 80.1 °F (26.7 °C); wind speeds of 15.9 miles per hour (25.6 km/h)
- Average speed: 67.32 mph (108.34 km/h)
- Attendance: 18,214

Pole position
Driver	Fred Lorenzen	Holman-Moody
- Time: 24.260 seconds

Most laps led
Driver	Fred Lorenzen	Holman-Moody
- Laps: 493

Winner
No. 28	Fred Lorenzen	Holman-Moody

Television in the United States
- Network: untelevised
- Announcers: none

The 1964 Old Dominion 500 was a NASCAR Grand National Series event that was held on September 24, 1964, at Martinsville Speedway in Martinsville, Virginia. Forty professional stock car racing drivers would become involved in an event that would become legendary.

The transition to purpose-built racecars began in the early 1960s and occurred gradually over that decade. Changes made to the sport by the late 1960s brought an end to the "strictly stock" vehicles of the 1950s.

== Background ==
Martinsville Speedway is one of five short tracks to hold NASCAR races. The standard track at Martinsville Speedway is a four-turn short track oval that is 0.526 miles (0.847 km) long. The track's turns are banked at eleven degrees, while the front stretch, the location of the finish line, is banked at zero degrees. The back stretch also has a zero degree banking.

== Race report ==
Fred Lorenzen defeated Richard Petty by 1/3 of a second in front of a live audience of 18,214 spectators; becoming the first recipient of the now-famous Martinsville Grandfather Clock. Lorenzen would also pick up his third win in a row at Martinsville.

Typical qualifying times for the race ranged from 24.2 seconds to 25.2 seconds with vehicles driving between 71.2 miles per hour (114.6 km/h) and 74.1 miles per hour (119.3 km/h). In addition to six changes in the lead driver, there were also six caution flags given out for 28 laps. The entire race took three hours and twenty-four minutes to go from green flag to the checkered flag. Top prize at the race was $4,715 ($48,946 when adjusted for inflation). Doug Yates and Buddy Arrington both qualified for the race but failed to start in it. Major Melton would make his final NASCAR Grand National Cup Series appearance in this race. The majority of the entries belonged to the Ford Motor Company. Model years for each vehicle ranged from 1962 to 1964; complying with the NASCAR rules and regulations for that era.

NASCAR was authorized to hand out a grand total of $17,580 to each of the drivers who participated in this event ($182,496 when adjusted for inflation). Even with his second-place finish, Petty clinched his first NASCAR championship after this race. Bill Whitley was credited as the actual last-place driver after acquiring a transmission problem on lap 6; bringing home a paycheck of $150 ($1,557 when adjusted for inflation).

At least 16 notable crew chiefs were recorded as attending this race; including Bud Moore, Herman Beam, Glen Wood, Bud Allman, Banjo Matthews and Vic Ballard.

Doug Wilson would retire from the NASCAR Cup Series after this race.

=== Qualifying ===
Grid	No.	Driver	Manufacturer	Speed	Qualifying time	Owner
1	28	Fred Lorenzen	'64 Ford	74.196	24.260	Holman-Moody
2	27	Junior Johnson	'64 Ford	73.770	24.400	Banjo Matthews
3	11	Ned Jarrett	'64 Ford	73.619	24.450	Bondy Long
4	7	Bobby Johns	'64 Ford	73.529	24.480	Holman-Moody
5	21	Marvin Panch	'64 Ford	73.469	24.500	Wood Brothers
6	25	Paul Goldsmith	'64 Plymouth	73.289	24.560	Ray Nichels
7	41	Jim Paschal	'64 Plymouth	73.170	24.600	Petty Enterprises
8	1	Billy Wade	'64 Mercury	73.051	24.640	Bud Moore
9	00	Cale Yarborough	'64 Ford	72.786	24.730	Holman-Moody
10	49	G.C. Spencer	'64 Ford	72.551	24.810	G.C. Spencer

A non-championship race determined the final 20 starters in the Old Dominion 500. Only Richard Petty and Doug Yates managed to lead laps in the event; Petty would go on to win the qualifying race.

=== Top 20 finishers ===
Pos	No.	Driver	Manufacturer	Laps	Laps led	Time/Status
1	28	Fred Lorenzen	Ford	500	493	3:42:49
2	43	Richard Petty	Plymouth	500	5	+0.33 laps
3	27	Junior Johnson	Ford	499	1	+1 lap
4	21	Marvin Panch	Ford	499	0	+1 lap
5	11	Ned Jarrett	Ford	497	1	+3 laps
6	16	Darel Dieringer	Mercury	491	0	+9 laps
7	26	Bobby Isaac	Dodge	491	0	+9 laps
8	6	David Pearson	Dodge	491	0	+9 laps
9	1	Billy Wade	Mercury	490	0	+10 laps
10	00	Cale Yarborough	Ford	489	0	+11 laps
11	5	Earl Balmer	Dodge	487	0	+13 laps
12	49	G.C. Spencer	Ford	486	0	+14 laps
13	3	Buck Baker	Dodge	484	0	+16 laps
14	19	Larry Thomas	Ford	480	0	+20 laps
15	46	J.T. Putney	Plymouth	452	0	+48 laps
16	84	Bert Robbins	Ford	451	0	+49 laps
17	31	Al White	Ford	441	0	+59 laps
18	09	Roy Mayne	Ford	436	0	+64 laps
19	17	Junior Spencer	Ford	436	0	+66 laps
20	83	Worth McMillion	Pontiac	436	0	+66 laps

== Timeline ==
Section reference:

- Start of race: Fred Lorenzen had the pole position to begin the race; Doug Yates and Buddy Arrington failed to start the race.
- Lap 6: Transmission problems forced Bill Whitley into the sidelines.
- Lap 11: Ronnie Croy would have oil pressure issues with his vehicle.
- Lap 18: Faulty brakes would relegate Jack Anderson to the sidelines.
- Lap 44: An overheating vehicle forced Buddy Baker off the track.
- Lap 124: Bunkie Blackburn would fail to finish the race due to issues with his vehicle's clutch.
- Lap 128: Bob Derrington's vehicle lost his rear end, forcing him off the track for safety reasons.
- Lap 164: Richard Petty took over the lead from Fred Lorenzen.
- Lap 165: Transmission problems managed to end Neil Castles' hopes of winning the event.
- Lap 169: Fred Lorenzen took over the lead from Richard Petty.
- Lap 171: Ned Jarrett took over the lead from Fred Lorenzen.
- Lap 172: Fred Lorenzen took over the lead from Ned Jarrett.
- Lap 184: Paul Goldsmith started feeling some "bad vibrations" from his vehicle.
- Lap 260: Doug Wilson managed to overheat his vehicle when he needed it the most.
- Lap 268: A wheel bearing came off Bill McMahan's vehicle.
- Lap 325: Bobby Johns had a terminal crash, forcing him to leave the event prematurely.
- Lap 338: Doug Cooper's brakes no longer worked, forcing him out of the race.
- Lap 339: Major Melton fell out with engine failure.
- Lap 340: Junior Johnson took over the lead from Fred Lorenzen.
- Lap 341: Fred Lorenzen took over the lead from Junior Johnson.
- Lap 344: LeeRoy Yarborough's vehicle started handling a little bit too funny, causing him not to finish the race.
- Lap 380: Wendell Scott managed to lose the rear end of his vehicle.
- Lap 383: Jim Paschal managed to lose the rear end of his vehicle.
- Lap 397: Elmo Langley managed to lose the rear end of his vehicle.
- Lap 414: Curtis Crider managed to lose his vehicle's rear end.
- Finish: Fred Lorenzen was officially declared the winner of the event.

Preceded by 1964 untitled race at Orange Speedway	NASCAR Grand National Series Season; 1964	Succeeded by 1964 untitled race at Savannah Speedway

Preceded by 1963	Old Dominion 500 races 1964	Succeeded by 1965
