= 1964 Daytona 500 =

Auto race held at Daytona International Speedway in 1964

Race details
- Race 8 of 62 in the 1964 NASCAR Grand National Series season
- 1964 Daytona 500 program cover
- Date: February 23, 1964
- Location: Daytona International Speedway; Daytona Beach, Florida, U.S.
- Course: Permanent racing facility
- Course length: 2.5 miles (4.02 km)
- Distance: 200 laps, 500 mi (804.672 km)
- Weather: Cold with temperatures of 55 °F (13 °C); wind speeds of 13 miles per hour (21 km/h)
- Average speed: 154.334 mph (248.376 km/h)

Pole position
Driver	Paul Goldsmith	Ray Nichels
- Time: 174.91 miles per hour (281.49 km/h)

Most laps led
Driver	Richard Petty	Petty Enterprises
- Laps: 184

Winner
No. 43	Richard Petty	Petty Enterprises

The 1964 Daytona 500, was a NASCAR Grand National Series event that was held on February 23, 1964, at Daytona International Speedway in Daytona Beach, Florida.

== Race report ==
The race was won by Richard Petty driving a 1964 Plymouth. Petty drove his number 43 to victory in 3 hours and 14 minutes. There were three caution flags that slowed the race for 19 laps. The Chrysler teams debuted their brand-new 426 ci Chrysler Hemi engine in this race. During the race itself, Richard Petty, who at the time was known best for his skill on short tracks, led 184 of the 200 laps (a Daytona 500 record that stands to this day) and Chrysler teams took four of the top five spots.

First Daytona 500 starts for Bobby Isaac, Doug Cooper, Johnny Rutherford, Jack Anderson, Jim Bray, and Neil Castles. Only Daytona 500 starts for Dave MacDonald, Jo Schlesser, Smokey Boutwell, Jim McElreath, Ronnie Chumley, Bobby Marshman, Joe Clark, Bill McMahan, and Jim Cook. Last Daytona 500 starts for Jimmy Pardue, Billy Wade, Dan Gurney, Larry Thomas, Ralph Earnhardt, Curtis Crider, Sal Tovella, Parnelli Jones, Fireball Roberts, and Elmo Henderson.

This was the first NASCAR race that had a purse of over $100,000.

== Race results ==
Pos	Grid	No.	Driver	Entrant	Manufacturer	Laps	Winnings	Laps led	Time/Status
1	2	43	Richard Petty	Petty Enterprises	1964 Plymouth	200	$33,300	184	3:14:23
2	6	54	Jimmy Pardue	Charles Robinson	1964 Plymouth	199	$11,600	0	+1 Lap
3	1	25	Paul Goldsmith	Ray Nichels	1964 Plymouth	198	$8,600	11	+2 Laps
4	9	21	Marvin Panch	Wood Brothers Racing	1964 Ford	198	$4,350	0	+2 Laps
5	10	15	Jim Paschal	Cotton Owens	1964 Dodge	197	$3,700	0	+3 Laps
6	21	1	Billy Wade	Bud Moore Engineering	1964 Mercury	197	$2,500	0	+3 Laps
7	11	16	Darel Dieringer	Bill Stroppe	1964 Mercury	197	$2,000	0	+3 Laps
8	14	29	Larry Frank	Holman-Moody	1964 Ford	197	$1,750	0	+3 Laps
9	3	3	Junior Johnson	Ray Fox	1964 Dodge	197	$1,500	0	+3 Laps
10	19	17	Dave MacDonald	Bill Stroppe	1964 Mercury	196	$1,200	0	+4 Laps
11	13	32	Tiny Lund	Graham Shaw	1964 Ford	195	$1,200	0	+5 Laps
12	5	41	Buck Baker	Petty Enterprises	1964 Plymouth	194	$1,200	0	+6 Laps
13	18	77	Jo Schlesser	Bondy Long	1964 Ford	192	$1,200	0	+8 Laps
14	20	12	Dan Gurney	Wood Brothers Racing	1964 Ford	192	$1,200	0	+8 Laps
15	4	26	Bobby Isaac	Ray Nichels	1964 Dodge	189	$1,500	3	Fuel
16	25	27	Larry Thomas	Ray Nichels	1963 Plymouth	188	$1,000	0	+12 Laps
17	22	19	Cale Yarborough	Herman Beam	1964 Ford	187	$1,000	0	+13 Laps
18	31	60	Doug Cooper	Bob Cooper	1963 Ford	186	$1,000	0	+14 Laps
19	28	31	Ralph Earnhardt	Tom Spell	1963 Ford	180	$1,000	0	+20 Laps
20	29	84	Smokey Boutwell	Rocky Hinton	1963 Ford	180	$1,000	0	+20 Laps
21	30	62	Curtis Crider	Curtis Crider	1963 Ford	177	$725	0	+23 Laps
22	39	95	Reb Wickersham	Ken Spikes	1964 Dodge	131	$725	0	Sway bar
23	24	09	Sal Tovella	Herb Onash	1964 Ford	129	$725	0	Engine
24	8	00	A. J. Foyt	Banjo Matthews	1964 Ford	127	$825	2	Engine
25	26	14	Jim McElreath	Bill Stroppe	1964 Mercury	126	$725	0	Crash
26	35	01	Johnny Rutherford	Bud Moore Engineering	1964 Mercury	107	$725	0	Crash
27	17	11	Ned Jarrett	Bondy Long	1964 Ford	106	$725	0	Crash
28	12	15	Parnelli Jones	Bill Stroppe	1964 Mercury	77	$725	0	Engine
29	42	89	Buddy Baker	David Walker	1964 Plymouth	64	$725	0	Engine
30	7	6	David Pearson	Cotton Owens	1964 Dodge	52	$725	0	Crash
31	34	28	Fred Lorenzen	Holman-Moody	1964 Ford	49	$725	0	Engine
32	36	92	Jack Anderson	Ray Osborne	1963 Ford	41	$725	0	Rear end
33	32	2	G. C. Spencer	G. C. Spencer	1963 Pontiac	31	$725	0	Engine
34	27	04	Ronnie Chumley	H. B. Bailey	1963 Pontiac	21	$725	0	Engine
35	16	06	Bobby Marshman	Holman-Moody	1964 Ford	17	$725	0	Overheating
36	23	7	Bobby Johns	Shorty Johns	1964 Pontiac	15	$725	0	Engine
37	15	22	Fireball Roberts	Holman-Moody	1964 Ford	13	$725	0	Transmission
38	40	34	Wendell Scott	Wendell Scott	1962 Chevrolet	7	$725	0	Overheating
39	37	70	Elmo Henderson	Paul Clayton	1963 Pontiac	4	$725	0	Engine
40	43	97	Joe Clark	Al McCline	1964 Ford	4	$725	0	Head gasket
41	44	82	Bill McMahan	Casper Hensley	1963 Pontiac	3	$725	0	Handling
42	45	56	Jim Bray	Nick Rampling	1962 Chevrolet	2	$725	0	Handling
43	33	71	Bunkie Blackburn	Roscoe Sanders	1963 Plymouth	1	$725	0	Crankshaft
44	41	61	Bob Cooper	Bob Cooper	1962 Pontiac	1	$725	0	Oil pressure
45	46	20	Jim Cook	Jack Anderson	1963 Ford	1	$725	0	Handling
46	38	86	Neil Castles	Buck Baker	1962 Chrysler	1	$725	0	Transmission

== Timeline ==
Section reference:

- Start of race: Paul Goldsmith started the event with the first-place position.
- Lap 2: Richard Petty took over the lead from Paul Goldsmith.
- Lap 3: Bill McMahan could not handle his racing vehicle properly.
- Lap 7: Bobby Isaac took over the lead from Richard Petty.
- Lap 10: Richard Petty took over the lead from Bobby Isaac.
- Lap 13: Fireball Roberts' transmission stopped working in a safe manner.
- Lap 15: Bobby Johns managed to blow his engine while he was driving.
- Lap 17: Bobby Marshman managed to overheat his vehicle.
- Lap 21: Ronnie Chumley managed to overheat his engine.
- Lap 31: G.C. Spencer had to leave the race due to a faulty engine.
- Lap 40: A.J. Foyt took over the lead from Richard Petty.
- Lap 42: Paul Goldsmith took over the lead from A.J. Foyt.
- Lap 49: Fred Lorenzen managed to blow his engine.
- Lap 52: Richard Petty took over the lead from Paul Goldsmith.
- Lap 54: David Pearson's accident forced the yellow flag to appear, caution ended on lap 60.
- Lap 64: Buddy Baker managed to blow his engine.
- Lap 77: Parnelli Jones managed to blow his engine.
- Lap 107: Johnny Rutherford had a terminal crash.
- Lap 112: Johnny Rutherford and Ned Jarrett's accident on turn two caused a caution, which ended on lap 118.
- Lap 126: Jim McElreath had a terminal crash.
- Lap 130: Jim McElreath's accident created a caution which ended on lap 134.
- Lap 189: Bobby Isaac ran out of fuel while racing.
- Finish: Richard Petty was officially declared the winner of the event.
