= Doug Cooper (racing driver) =

American racing driver (1938–1987)

- Born: September 9, 1938; Gastonia, North Carolina, U.S.
- Died: September 3, 1987 (aged 48)
- Awards: 1964 Grand National Series Rookie of the Year

NASCAR Cup Series career
- 113 races run over 6 years
- Best finish: 19th (1965)
- First race: 1963 South Boston 400 (South Boston)
- Last race: 1968 Southeastern 500 Bristol)
Wins	Top tens	Poles
0	29	0
- Statistics up to date as of May 23, 2013.

Doug Cooper (September 9, 1938 – September 3, 1987) was a NASCAR driver who competed on the Grand National circuit for six seasons from 1963 to 1968. He is best known for winning the NASCAR Rookie of the Year award in 1964.

== Racing career ==
Born in Gastonia, North Carolina, Cooper made his Grand National debut in 1963 at South Boston Speedway, starting and finish in last place in the 22-car field after a head gasket failure on the opening lap. He came back the next race with a career-best third-place finish at Occoneechee Speedway, a position in which he would finish on two more occasions in his Grand National career.

Cooper would have his best season in 1964, as he posted career highs in top-fives (4), top-tens (11), and average finish (16.4). He tied his career-best finish of third place at Piedmont Interstate Fairgrounds that season. He ended that season ranked 21st in the standings after competing in 39 of 62 races and was named the NASCAR Rookie of the Year for 1964.

Cooper would compete regularly on the Grand National circuit for the next three seasons following his 1964 Rookie of the Year campaign, finishing a career high 19th in the standings in 1965. He would also compete in three NASCAR Modified races in 1965 and 1966, posting two top ten finishes, including a fifth-place finish at Daytona International Speedway.

Having competed for his own team for much of his career, Cooper ran eight races for two-time Grand National champion Buck Baker in 1967, posting a best finish of eighth place at Asheville-Weaverville Speedway. He would compete in just one race in 1968, driving for owner/driver Henley Gray at Bristol Motor Speedway, finishing in 27th place after a ball joint failure just 206 laps into the 500-lap event. He quietly retired from racing afterwards at age 29, having earned 11 top fives and 29 top tens in 113 career starts on the Grand National circuit.

== Death ==
Cooper died on September 3, 1987, just six days shy of his 49th birthday.

== Awards ==
Awards
Preceded by Billy Wade	NASCAR Grand National Series Rookie of the Year; 1964	Succeeded by Sam McQuagg
