= NASCAR Cup Series at Nashville Superspeedway =

NASCAR Cup Series race at Nashville Superspeedway

Cracker Barrel 400

NASCAR Cup Series
- Venue: Nashville Superspeedway
- Location: Gladeville, Tennessee
- Corporate sponsor: Cracker Barrel
- First race: 2021
- Distance: 400 mi (640 km)
- Laps: 300; Stage 1: 90; Stage 2: 95; Final stage: 115
- Previous names: Ally 400 (2021–2024)
- Most wins (team): Hendrick Motorsports; Team Penske (2)
- Most wins (manufacturer): Chevrolet (3)

Circuit information
- Surface: Concrete
- Length: 1.333 mi (2.145 km)
- Turns: 4

The Cracker Barrel 400 is a NASCAR Cup Series race held at Nashville Superspeedway since 2021. The race is currently held as a 300 lap, 400 mile (640 km) race.

The NASCAR O'Reilly Auto Parts Series and NASCAR Craftsman Truck Series host support races with the Sports Illustrated Resorts 250 and Allegiance 200, respectively.

Denny Hamlin is the defending race winner, having won it in 2026.

== History ==
The Cup Series last raced in the Nashville area in 1984 at Fairgrounds Speedway. Nashville Superspeedway, a 1.33-mile (2.14 km) oval in Gladeville near the town of Lebanon, opened in 2001 with the NASCAR Busch Series conducting the inaugural event. NASCAR chairman Bill France Jr. was present at the track's opening on April 11, while Cup drivers Dale Earnhardt, Bobby Hamilton, Sterling Marlin, and Darrell Waltrip were honorees. Seating capacity was 50,000, which was not considered enough for a Cup crowd at the time, though Denis McGlynn of track operator Dover Motorsports noted in 1999 that the stands could be doubled or tripled should it receive a Cup race.

The NASCAR Craftsman Truck Series, ARCA Re/Max Series, and IndyCar Series would also race at the track during the 2000s. However, the superspeedway struggled with attendance and lost its NASCAR races after the 2011 season. Nashville's post-NASCAR use would be limited to stock car driving experiences and car storage by Nissan as the manufacturer had a plant in nearby Smyrna; Dover Motorsports placed the track on the market and attempted to close sales several times but saw each attempted sale fall through.

Starting in 2019 there was discussion that NASCAR would return the Cup Series to Fairgrounds Speedway, with Speedway Motorsports negotiating to promote the event; NASCAR's other major series, the then-Busch Series and Craftsman Truck Series, had last run there in 2000. However, on June 3, 2020, in what was considered a surprise announcement, Dover Motorsports announced the superspeedway would join the Cup Series schedule for the first time in 2021, replacing a date at Dover International Speedway on a four-year agreement. Nevertheless, negotiations continued for a race at Fairgrounds Speedway, possibly beginning in 2022.

On January 19, 2021, Ally Financial announced it acquired the naming rights for the race, dubbing it the Ally 400. The event was scheduled to be part of a tripleheader with the NASCAR Xfinity Series and NASCAR Camping World Truck Series; the Cup Series race was broadcast on NBCSN. The tripleheader event returned for 2022, with the Cup race being broadcast on NBC and later on USA Network after a rain delay. In 2023, possibly due to the popularity of the 2022's event finishing under the lights, the event became a night race, and returned to being a night race in 2025 after 2024's race was held during the afternoon.

On April 10, 2025, Cracker Barrel announced it acquired the naming rights for the race replacing Ally

== Past winners ==
Year	Date	No.	Driver	Team	Manufacturer	Race distance		Race time	Average speed (mph)	Report	Ref
Year	Date	No.	Driver	Team	Manufacturer	Laps	Miles (km)	Race time	Average speed (mph)	Report	Ref
2021	June 20	5	Kyle Larson	Hendrick Motorsports	Chevrolet	300	400 (643.736)	3:30:23	113.792	Report	
2022	June 26	9	Chase Elliott	Hendrick Motorsports	Chevrolet	300	400 (643.736)	3:35:15	111.22	Report	
2023	June 25	1	Ross Chastain	Trackhouse Racing	Chevrolet	300	400 (643.736)	3:00:07	132.914	Report	
2024	June 30	22	Joey Logano	Team Penske	Ford	331*	441.223 (705.956)	4:03:54	108.298	Report	
2025	June 1	12	Ryan Blaney	Team Penske	Ford	300	400 (643.736)	3:05:29	129.068	Report	
2026	May 31	11	Denny Hamlin	Joe Gibbs Racing	Toyota	300	400 (643.736)	3:44:57	106.424	Report	
2027	June 6									Report	

=== Notes ===
- 2024: Race extended due to an overtime finish.

=== Multiple winners (teams) ===
# Wins	Team	Years won
2	Hendrick Motorsports	2021, 2022
2	Team Penske	2024, 2025

=== Manufacturer wins ===
# Wins	Manufacturer	Years won
3	Chevrolet	2021–2023
2	Ford	2024, 2025

Previous race: Coca-Cola 600	NASCAR Cup Series; Cracker Barrel 400	Next race: The Great American Getaway 400
