= Augusta International Raceway =

Defunct motorsport track in the United States

Coordinates: 33°21′24″N 82°5′14″W

Augusta International Speedway Eight Track Complex
- Location: near Augusta, Georgia - USA
- Capacity: 70,000+ All Tracks Combined
- Owner: Augusta/Richmond County Taxpayers
- Broke ground: 1959; 67 years ago
- Opened: 1960; 66 years ago
- Closed: 1970; 56 years ago
- Major events: 13 Major Events

1/2 Mile Oval, 3 Mile Road Course, 1/4 Mile Drag Strip, Kart Track, Micro Midget Track, Motorcycle Track, 2 Mile Tri Oval (started but not completed), Hydroplane Lake (started but not completed)
- Banking: Turns: Various for the different tracks

The Augusta International Raceway was a multi-use motorsports facility located in Hephzibah, Georgia, (just south of Augusta). It was designed by Fireball Roberts.

== History ==
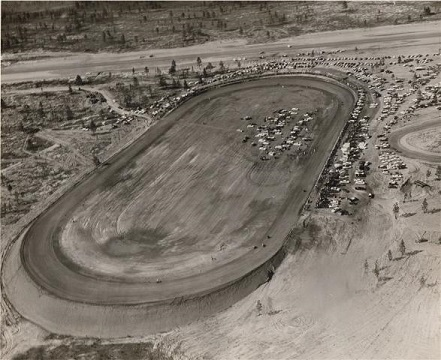
Augusta International Speedway 1/2 Mile Oval

=== Half mile oval ===
The 0.5-mile (0.80 km) oval hosted NASCAR Grand National Series races from 1962 to 1969. During that time span they ran 12 races with eight different winners.

On June 19, 1962 Joe Weatherly started on the pole position with a lap of 63.069 mph (101.500 km/h). Joe drove his Bud Moore-owned Pontiac to a 1-lap victory over Ned Jarrett. Augusta International Speedway back in 1962 was a .500 dirt mile oval. The race was 200 laps and saw only 16 cars start the race.

Less than a month later Joe did a repeat by winning on July 17, 1962, over Richard Petty. Fred Lorenzen took home the win on September 13, 1962, over Petty.

In 1963 a crowd of 4,000 in attendance saw Ned Jarrett take his Burton Robinson #11 Ford to victory lane over Richard Petty on April 4, 1963.

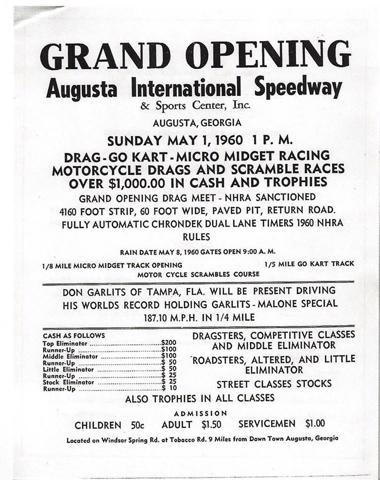
Opening Day Schedule

On August 15, 1965 Dick Hutcherson won the 200 lap event with a 2.75 second lead over David Pearson. On November 14, 1965, Richard Petty took home a victory in the "Georgia Cracker 300".

November 13, 1966, saw Richard Petty win at the half mile oval with an average speed of 84.112. The movie (Tiny Lund) Harder Charger was partly made. Tiny dropped out of the race with a broken distributor gear. After the race, in the movie a young Southern MotoRacing sales girl (Joy Tollison Agner) can be seen kissing Richard Petty and jumping up and down in excitement.

Rex White won two races at the half mile track, and it was the last track at which he raced.

On May 3, 1968 Bobby Isaac won the "Dixie 250" over Buddy Baker in his K & K Insurance Dodge. Later that year on October 5, 1968, David Pearson won over Bobby Allison in his Holman Moody-owned Ford.

On March 16, 1969, David Pearson won the first of two events at the track during this last season of racing. He won over Richard Petty with Bobby Isaac finishing third after starting on the pole with a record lap of 86.901 mph (139.854 km/h). On October 19, 1969, a field of 29 cars took the green flag at the track for the last time. The 4,500 that attended the race only saw two lead changes between Bobby Isaac and Richard Petty. The entire race went caution free. The race time was only 1:16:12 and the average speed was 78.74 mph (126.72 km/h). Bobby Isaac won for the second time at the track.

=== Road circuit ===
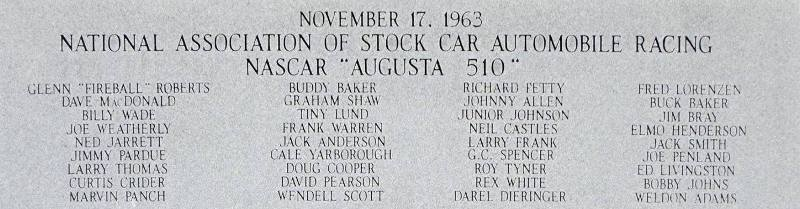

Located next to the 1/2 Mile Oval was the Augusta International Raceway 3 Mile road circuit. This former track is being developed into the 300-acre (1.2 km^{2}) Diamond Lakes Regional Park.

The "Augusta 510" was run on November 17, 1963, at the road circuit with a noon start time and a 5:00 PM end time. The race actually covered 417 miles (671 km) because of the time limit.

The raceway was one of the fastest road courses in the country.

This event was the second race of the 1964 season for the Grand National Division of NASCAR, later evolving into the present-day Cup Series. The preceding race was held at Concord Motor Speedway and the following race was held at Jacksonville, Florida. Glenn "Fireball" Roberts was the winner of the "Augusta 510" and he would die later that season as the result of burns suffered at Charlotte Motor Speedway. He was driving a 1963 Ford and Augusta would be his last win.

The pole sitter was Fred Lorenzen with a speed of 89.545. He would only run 12 laps before engine failure forced him to retire. Lorenzen, Roberts, and sports car star Dave MacDonald were teammates for the Augusta 510 and MacDonald's 2nd-place finish gave Holman Moody the top two spots. Weldon Adams would finish last after completing only two laps. Wendell Scott would finish 18th. He would win the next event in Jacksonville becoming the first and only black driver to win a NASCAR race at this level until Bubba Wallace's win at Talladega Superspeedway in 2021. 36 cars started the Augusta 510 and 16 cars finished. The event lasted for four hours and fifty minutes and the average speed was 86.32 miles per hour (138.92 km/h). There were 10 lead changes during the event with Richard Petty leading the most laps (56). The total purse for the event was $50,620. The expected turnout was to be 75,000 fans. Only 15,000 actually attended.

The "Augusta 510" was the second race of the 1964 season. Six of the top seven finishers would lose their lives before the next racing season: Glenn "Fireball" Roberts, Dave MacDonald, Joe Weatherly, Billy Wade, Larry Thomas, and Jimmy Pardue; the seventh driver was Ned Jarrett.

On March 1, 1964, the United States Road Racing Championship (USRRC) held two 150 mile events on the road course. Dave MacDonald won the first race in a King Cobra, Jim Hall was second in a Chaparral 2A and Bob Holbert was third in another King Cobra. Ken Miles and Dave MacDonald finished 1–2 in Cobra Roadsters in the afternoon race. Dave would lose his life a few weeks later at the Indy 500.

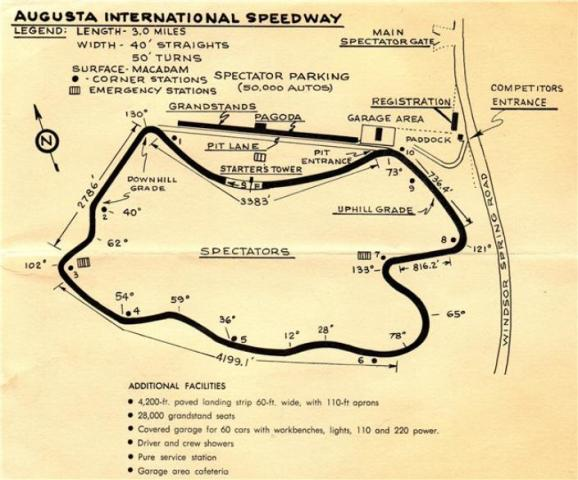
The Augusta International Raceway 3.2 mile road circuit was state of the art for its time

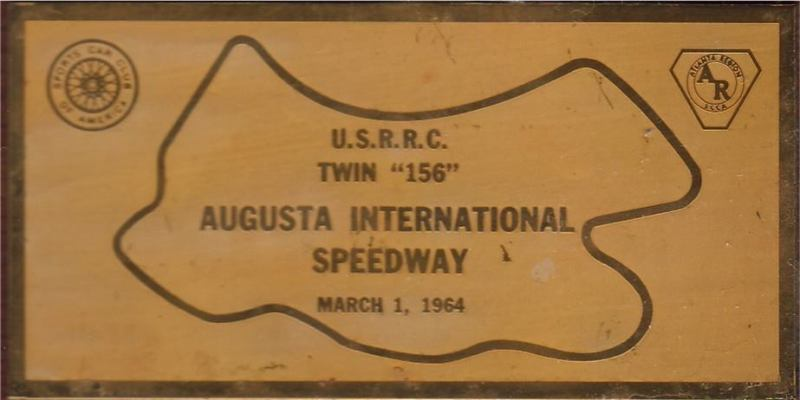
USRRC event held on March 1, 1964

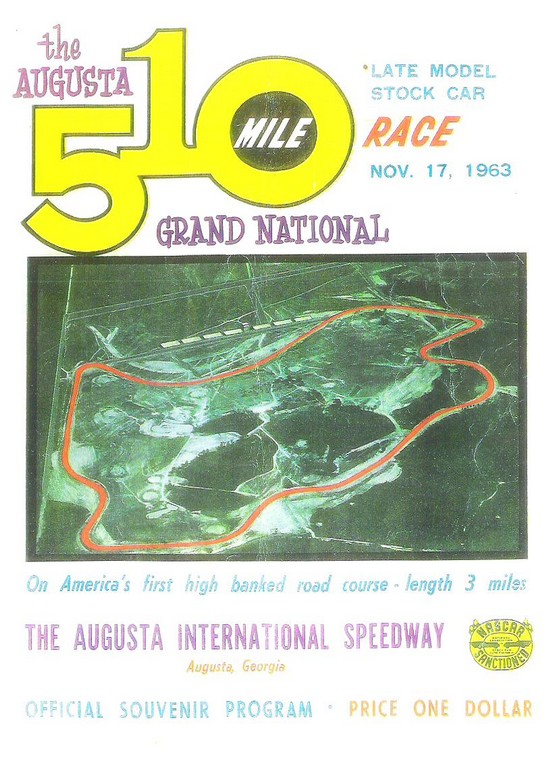
NASCAR "Augusta 510" - November 17, 1963

== Road course description ==
The track itself is a 3-mile (4.8 km) long banked road course with 21 total turns. The width of the track is 45 feet (14 m).

The track elevation change is 120 feet (37 m) with the highest point being at pit exit and the lowest point on the "backstretch" where the spring fed infield lakes drain into Spirit Creek just outside the track. Joe Weatherly called this part of the track "Alligator Hollow".

The track had a 15,000-square-foot (1,400 m^{2}) garage area (50' x 300') with two restrooms and showers.

There were seven main grandstands located along the pit lane.

The control tower was located between the fourth and fifth grandstand.

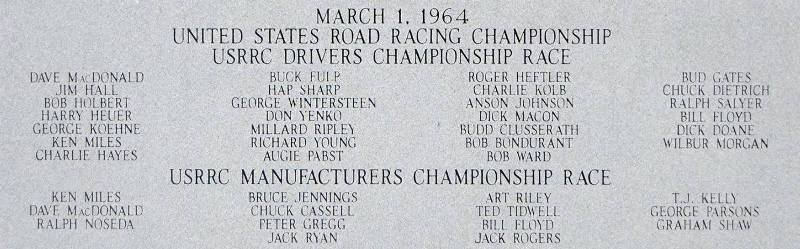
USRRC twin 156 races - March 1, 1964

== Since the closure ==
In 2001, the Augusta International Raceway Preservation Society (AIRPS), a 501c3 non profit, was formed to document the former Augusta International Speedway complex and work with local officials to develop the former 8-track racing complex into Diamond Lakes Regional Park. The Society sponsors the 5Wkids Outdoor Learning Area adjacent to the Diamond Lakes Community Center/Library Complex and dedicated a portion of this area as the Rex White Motorsports Memorial Plaza – Home To 5Wkids Outdoor Learning Area in September 2017. This outdoor green space for learning, which contains the memorial and seating for an entire classroom of young folks, will be used to educate by using the 5W's of learning: "Who, What, When, Where, Why?" The Augusta International Raceway Preservation Society can be reached at: AIRPS PO Box 212248 Martinez, Georgia 30917 USA

Diamond Lakes park

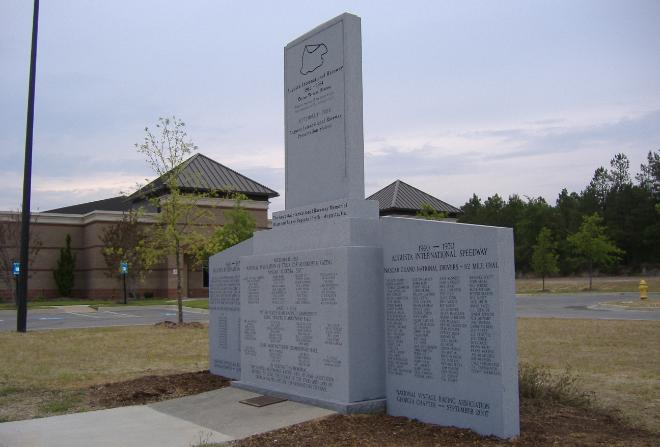
Augusta International Raceway Memorial, located in the 5Wkids Outdoor Learning Area

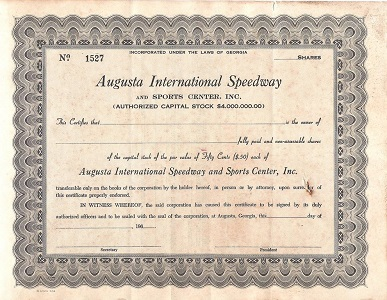
Augusta International Speedway stock certificate
