= Sandlapper 200 =

Former NASCAR race

- Venue: Columbia Speedway
- First race: 1951
- Last race: 1972
- Distance: 100 miles (160.9 km)
- Laps: 200
- Previous names: Unknown (1951–1961); Sandlapper 200 (1963–1972)

The Sandlapper 200 was a NASCAR stock car race held at Columbia Speedway, in Cayce, South Carolina. It was one of two Grand National Series races held at the track between 1951 and 1971; with the contraction of the schedule following R. J. Reynolds' assumption of primary sponsorship of the renamed Winston Cup Series, the race was resanctioned as part of the NASCAR Grand National East Series for its final running in 1972.

The race was traditionally the second of the two Grand National events run at the track; it was not run between 1952 and 1954, and was one of three in 1955 and from 1958 to 1960. In 1972 it was the second of three Grand National East races there. Tim Flock won the inaugural event in 1951; Rex White won the run under the "Sandlapper 200" name in 1962; this gave Chevrolet its 100th NASCAR win. Richard Petty won the final Winston Cup Series race at the track in 1971; a combined race with NASCAR Grand American cars, it was postponed one day due to rain. The lone Grand National East-sanctioned race in 1972 was won by Buddy Baker. The races were 100 miles (160.9 km) in length, except for the 1960 event, which was 150 miles (241.4 km).

Following the end of the event's time as a NASCAR national touring series event, it continued for several years as a Sportsman Division race; Jack Ingram won the event in 1974, held on Memorial Day.

== Past winners ==
Year	Date	Driver	Team	Manufacturer	Race Distance		Race Time	Average Speed (mph)	Report
Year	Date	Driver	Team	Manufacturer	Laps	Miles (km)	Race Time	Average Speed (mph)	Report
Grand National/Winston Cup
1951	September 7	Tim Flock		Oldsmobile	200	100.000 (160.934)	n/a	n/a	-
1952-1954: not held
1955	October 15	Tim Flock	Kiekhaefer Racing Team	Chrysler	200	100.000 (160.934)	1:49:19	55.393	-
1956	September 29	Buck Baker	Kiekhaefer Racing Team	Dodge	200	100.000 (160.934)	1:38:03	61.193	-
1957	September 19	Buck Baker	Baker Racing	Chevrolet	200	100.000 (160.934)	1:39:09	60.514	-
1958	August 7	Speedy Thompson		Chevrolet	200	100.000 (160.934)	1:49:27	54.920	-
1959	August 29	Lee Petty	Petty Enterprises	Plymouth	200	100.000 (160.934)	2:04:19	48.264	-
1960	August 18	Rex White		Chevrolet	300	150.000 (241.402)	2:45:51	54.265	-
1961	July 20	Cotton Owens		Pontiac	200	100.000 (160.934)	1:36:28	62.198	-
1962	July 7	Rex White		Chevrolet	200	100.000 (160.934)	1:36:12	62.370	-
1963	August 8	Richard Petty	Petty Enterprises	Plymouth	200	100.000 (160.934)	1:47:55	55.598	Report
1964	August 21	David Pearson		Dodge	200	100.000 (160.934)	1:37:15	61.697	-
1965	August 19	David Pearson		Dodge	200	100.000 (160.934)	1:44:36	57.361	-
1966	August 18	David Pearson		Dodge	200	100.000 (160.934)	1:30:44	66.128	-
1967	August 17	Richard Petty	Petty Enterprises	Plymouth	200	100.000 (160.934)	1:33:21	64.274	-
1968	August 8	David Pearson	Holman Moody	Ford	200	100.000 (160.934)	1:29:30	67.039	-
1969	August 8	Bobby Isaac	K&K Insurance Racing	Dodge	200	100.000 (160.934)	1:25:26	70.230	Report
1970	August 6	Bobby Isaac	K&K Insurance Racing	Dodge	200	100.000 (160.934)	1:29:25	67.101	-
1971	August 27	Richard Petty	Petty Enterprises	Plymouth	200	100.000 (160.934)	1:34:24	64.831	Report
Grand National East
1972	July 28	Buddy Baker	Donlavey Racing	Ford	200	100.000 (160.934)	1:29:10	68.507	-
Sportsman
1973	No known data								
1974	May 30	Jack Ingram		Chevrolet	200	100.000 (160.934)		70.465	-

=== Multiple winners (drivers) ===
# Wins	Driver	Years won
4	David Pearson	1964, 1965, 1966, 1968
3	Richard Petty	1963, 1967, 1971
2	Tim Flock	1951, 1955
2	Buck Baker	1956, 1957
2	Rex White	1960, 1962
2	Bobby Isaac	1969, 1970

=== Manufacturer wins ===
# Wins	Make	Years won
6	(United States) Dodge	1956, 1964–1966, 1969, 1970
5	(United States) Chevrolet	1957, 1958, 1960, 1962, 1974
4	(United States) Plymouth	1959, 1963, 1967, 1971
2	(United States) Ford	1968, 1972
1	(United States) Oldsmobile	1951
1	(United States) Chrysler	1955
1	(United States) Pontiac	1961
