= Birmingham International Raceway =

5/8-mile oval paved racetrack located at the Alabama State Fairgrounds

Coordinates: 33°29′52″N 86°52′17″W

- Location: West Birmingham, Jefferson County, Alabama, United States
- Length: 1 km (0.62 mi)
- Banking: Turns: 8° Straights: 5°

Birmingham International Raceway, (BIR) (formerly Fairgrounds Raceway, Birmingham Super Speedway, Birmingham Super Raceway and Birmingham International Speedway) was a 5/8-mile oval paved racetrack located at the Alabama State Fairgrounds in the Five Points West neighborhood of Birmingham, Alabama. It was used primarily for late-model automobile racing.

== History ==
The original one-mile dirt oval was built as a horse track. On October 7, 1906, the track hosted its first motorcycle race, followed by an automobile race three days later. These events continued regularly through 1917. A 10,000-seat grandstand was built in 1925.

In 1932 the oval was reduced to a half-mile circuit. The smaller configuration was used until July 4, 1942, when it closed for World War II. It was reopened on October 1, 1946, and began hosting weekly auto-racing events organized by promoter J. P. Rotton.

A quarter-mile dirt oval was added in 1958 and was the first track to be paved, with the first events held on the new surface on July 15, 1960. After one season of racing on the quarter-mile track the present five-eighths-mile course was constructed with its first race held on June 28, 1962. With new lighting the Sunday afternoon races were moved to Friday nights.

Between 1958 and 1968 a total of eight NASCAR Cup Series races were run at the Fairgrounds Raceway. During the same period Bobby Allison had moved to Hueytown from Miami, Florida, and convinced his brother Donnie and fellow racer Red Farmer to join him in founding a new race shop. The so-called "Alabama Gang" dominated the races at the Fairgrounds track, but other legends of the sport also recorded wins, including "Fireball" Roberts, Richard Petty, and Ned Jarrett. In 1969, the sanctioning body moved the date from Birmingham to a new fast 2.66 mile track, the Alabama International Motor Speedway.

The track also hosted one NASCAR Convertible Series event in 1959 and 4 NASCAR Southeast Series races between 1991 and 2002.

The facility hosted one CARS Hooters Pro Cup Series event in 1997.

Her final day of racing glory was October 26, 2008. On the final day, there were two divisions that raced, Modifieds and Late Model. Dustin Knowles started from the pole, led every lap, and won the modified race. Justin South won the late model race in a photo finish.

== Proposed move ==
On June 19, 2008, Birmingham Mayor Larry Langford proposed a plan to move BIR from the Fairgrounds to city-owned property in northwest Birmingham. Langford said the track, which had been in continuous operation for over 80 years in Five Points West, needed to be upgraded, and did not fit into current plans for the renovation of Fair Park. Langford committed $1 million to the project, but stated that track officials would have to come up with the majority of the funds needed for the project.

After the 2008 race season, the track was shut down. On January 30, 2009, demolition of the grandstand began, and was completed two months later.
