= Larry Thomas (racing driver) =

American racing driver

- Born: April 13, 1936
- Died: January 25, 1965; Georgia, U.S.

NASCAR Cup Series career
- 126 races run over 4 years
- Best finish: 8th (1964)
- First race: 1961 Myers Brothers 200 (Bowman Gray)
- Last race: 1964 Unnamed Race (Jacksonville)
Wins	Top tens	Poles
0	56	0

Larry Thomas (April 13, 1936 – January 25, 1965) was a NASCAR Grand National Series driver from Thomasville, North Carolina. Thomas died in a non-racing related car crash during the start of the 1965 NASCAR season.

== Driving career ==
Thomas began his racing career in 1956 driving hobby stocks and modifieds at Bowman-Gray Stadium. He began his NASCAR career in 1961 driving for Wade Younts. His best finish was seventh at South Boston Speedway. During the 1962 season, Thomas encountered a significant number of mechanical failures which marred him in seventeenth place in the standings. His 1963 campaign did not fare much better as he ended up twenty-second in the point standings. 1964 was Thomas' breakout season. Though he still suffered quite a few mechanical failures throughout the season, he finished eighth in the final point standings and earned a career-best second-place finish at Hickory Speedway. Also in 1964, Thomas was involved in a significant wreck at Jacksonville Speedway when he flipped over the Younts' owned Dodge. Thomas escaped without serious injury.

== Death ==
Getting ready for the 1965 season, Thomas was driving to a tire test when he drove off Interstate 75 in Georgia and landed in a thirty-five foot embankment killing him instantly.
