= New Asheville Speedway =

Former racetrack in Asheville, North Carolina

- Location: 220 Amboy Road; Asheville, North Carolina 28806
- Coordinates: 35.565816°N 82.581353°W
- Opened: 1960
- Closed: 1999
- Former names: Asheville Speedway; Asheville Motor Speedway; New Asheville Motor Speedway
- Major events: NASCAR Grand National Series (1962–1971)

Oval
- Surface: Asphalt
- Length: 0.333 mi (0.536 km)

The New Asheville Speedway, later renamed the Asheville Motor Speedway, also known as the Asheville Speedway, was a short oval racetrack on Amboy Road in Asheville, North Carolina. It opened in 1960 and hosted eight NASCAR Grand National Series races between 1962 and 1971, along with weekly local racing, until it closed in 1999. The land is now Carrier Park, where the old oval is used as a bicycle track.

== History ==
=== Opening and NASCAR ===
The track was built in 1960 on the former Owen Field airstrip and started out as a dirt oval. Mary and Bob Greenwood owned the original property. Before NASCAR's first visit, the track was paved and shortened. About 5,000 fans attended that first Grand National race on July 13, 1962, which Jack Smith won. Racing-Reference lists that race on a 0.4-mile (0.64 km) layout and the later races on a 1/3-mile (0.54 km) layout.

The track held eight Grand National races through 1971. Ned Jarrett and Richard Petty each won twice.

=== Other series ===
The track also hosted a NASCAR Grand American race in 1970, won by Jim Paschal. From 1970 to 1982 it held NASCAR Late Model Sportsman National Championship races. Later it held NASCAR Winston Racing Series, All Pro Super Series and NASCAR Charlotte/Daytona Dash Series races, and the last Dash Series race listed there was in 1994. Bob Pressley, Jack Ingram, Tommy Houston, Butch Lindley and Harry Gant were frequent winners in the Late Model Sportsman races.

=== Local racing ===
For nearly 40 years the track ran local races on Friday nights, with crowds of up to about 5,000 each week. A study found that a six-month racing season brought more than $2.2 million into the local economy. The Pressley family was among its most successful: Bob Pressley won seven track championships, his son Robert Pressley won five, including a record four in a row, and Robert's brother Charley won three. Russell "Russ" Leicht Sr. was a former owner of the track. Western North Carolina native and NASCAR Hall of Fame inductee Jack Ingram was a regular at the track.

=== Closure ===
Owner Roger Gregg chose to sell the speedway in the late 1990s. He said he wanted to spend more of his summers with his young son and hoped to steer clear of problems under the city's tougher noise ordinance. In 1998 RiverLink, an Asheville environmental nonprofit, raised $1.1 million to buy the 50-acre (20 ha) site, and the Biltmore Company supplied $250,000 of that money. RiverLink then donated the land to the City of Asheville on October 13, 1998, requiring that it be used as a park. City Council discussed the sale and transfer in closed sessions, and no public hearing was held before the handover. Asheville City Council member Jan Davis said this left many people hurt and angry. Supporters of the track later brought City Council a petition with more than 20,000 signatures asking for one more season of racing, and the council allowed it. The last race was held in September 1999.

Some residents connected the closure to the Biltmore Company, which had begun building a $31 million hotel on the Biltmore Estate in the late 1990s, close enough to the track that racing noise could be heard there. Davis recalled that a tire shop worker at the hotel's groundbreaking predicted the speedway would not survive. At a City Council meeting in March 2000, speakers claimed the track had been shut down so the new hotel would not be disturbed by racing noise. Mayor Leni Sitnick responded that Gregg himself had placed the restrictions on racing at the site, and that the closed-door session used to acquire the land was allowed under state law.

=== Carrier Park ===
The city turned the land into Carrier Park and kept the oval as a bicycle track known as the "Mellowdrome". The track surface was resealed for cycling in 2001. In September 2010 a memorial to the speedway was dedicated at the park. It is a 6-by-8-foot wall painted to look like a checkered flag. In November 2021, hundreds of fans and former drivers gathered at the WNC Agricultural Center for a New Asheville Speedway reunion, which included a memorial for Ingram, who had died earlier that year.

== NASCAR Grand National winners ==
Winners of the track's eight Grand National races:

Date	Winner	Manufacturer
July 13, 1962	Jack Smith	Pontiac
July 14, 1963	Ned Jarrett	Ford
May 31, 1964	Ned Jarrett	Ford
May 29, 1965	Junior Johnson	Ford
June 3, 1966	David Pearson	Dodge
June 2, 1967	Jim Paschal	Plymouth
May 31, 1968	Richard Petty	Plymouth
May 21, 1971	Richard Petty	Plymouth
