= Islip Speedway =

Sports venue

Coordinates: 40.7495°N 73.2115°W

"World Famous Islip Speedway"
- Islip Speedway (from an aerial view)
- Location: Islip, New York
- Opened: 1947
- Closed: 1984
- Major events: Grand National Series

Oval Figure 8
- Length: 0.20 mi (.32 km)
- Turns: 4

Islip Speedway was a .2-mile (320-meter) oval race track in Islip, New York which was open from 1947 until 1984. It is the smallest track to host NASCAR's Grand National Series, from 1964 to 1971. The first demolition derby took place at Islip Speedway in 1958. The idea was patented by Larry Mendelsohn, who worked at Islip Speedway. The speedway has since been demolished.

== Demolition Derby ==
Islip Speedway is credited with hosting the first demolition derby, which took place in 1958. According to Larry Mendelsohn, he originated the idea after realizing that spectators enjoyed watching the cars crash more than the races. However, there are alternative accounts to the origins of demolition derby. One source claims that Don Basile invented the demolition derby at Carrell Speedway in 1947. The ABC television show Wide World of Sports broadcast demolition derbies at Islip Speedway beginning in the early 1960s. This exposure gave the event national attention and helped increase its popularity.

== Figure 8 ==
In 1962, a Figure 8 track was added. The Figure 8 course shared the north and south turns with the oval and crisscrossed using lanes paved through the infield. The first Figure 8 race was held on August 11, 1962. The popular Figure 8 class became a regularly featured division from the time of its inception until the track's final date of operation September 8, 1984.

In 1964, track promoter Larry Mendelsohn conceived the idea of hosting the first "Figure 8 World Championship" event and sold his idea to ABC-TV, who would film the daytime event for broadcast at a later date on their popular Saturday afternoon television show, ABC's Wide World of Sports. To draw out-of-town competitors, Mendelsohn would guarantee a starting spot in the feature event to all Figure 8 division track champions who would travel to Long Island and represent their home track, hoping to claim the title of "World Champion". The remaining starting positions were determined through heat races. The "Demolition Derby World Championship" was held immediately following the "Figure 8 World Championship" feature race and was also taped for future broadcast on ABC's Wide World of Sports. These broadcasts led to increased exposure and notoriety of the track, which came to be known as "World Famous Islip Speedway". Figure 8 drivers who won the title and were crowned "Figure 8 World Champion" at Islip were: 1963- Larry Wood, Northport, NY; 1964-Benny Giaraputo, West Islip, NY; 1965-Art Cox, Anderson, IN; 1966-Forrest Halliburton, Indianapolis, IN; 1967-Richie Gomes, Brentwood, NY; 1968-Richard Simmons, Plymouth, MI; 1969-Aaron Coller, Tampa, FL; 1970-Lester Slone, Pinellas Park, FL; 1971 & 1973-Sonny Thompson, Indianapolis, IN; 1972- Bobby Lane, Bay Shore, NY; 1974 & 1975-Carl Voelker, Islip NY; 1976 & 1979-Chuck Hall, Toledo, OH; 1977-Quinn Vollgraff, Ronkonkoma, NY; 1978-Allen Brock, Medford, NY; 1980-Eddie Sutton, Crownville, MD; 1981, 1982 & 1983-Doug Huber, Bellport, NY; 1984-Chuck Hlatky, Ronkonkoma, NY.

== NASCAR racing ==
Islip Speedway hosted six races from 1964 to 1971, skipping the years 1969 and 1970. Richard Petty won the last NASCAR race at Islip by two laps. Others who have won at Islip include Bobby Allison and Billy Wade. NASCAR stopped coming to Islip Speedway when the organization axed all races shorter than 250 miles (400 km) from its schedule.

== Gallery ==
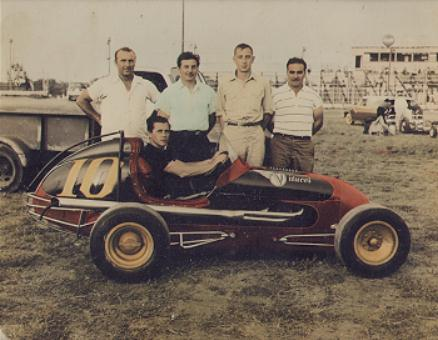
Legendary race driver Johnny Coy at Islip Speedway behind the wheel of the Vitucci midget number 10. Car owner Angelo Vitucci is standing (second from left).

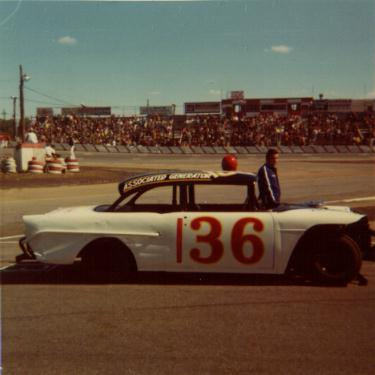
1970 Figure 8 World Champion Lester Slone of Pinellas Park, Florida at Islip Speedway, 1972.

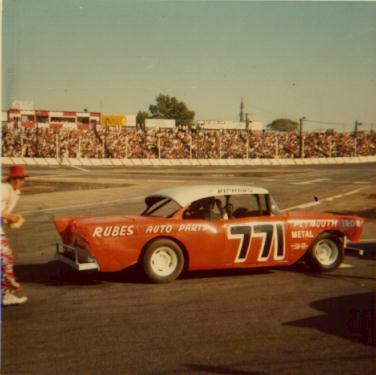
1968 Figure 8 World Champion "Li'l Richard" Simmons of Plymouth, Michigan at Islip Speedway, 1974.

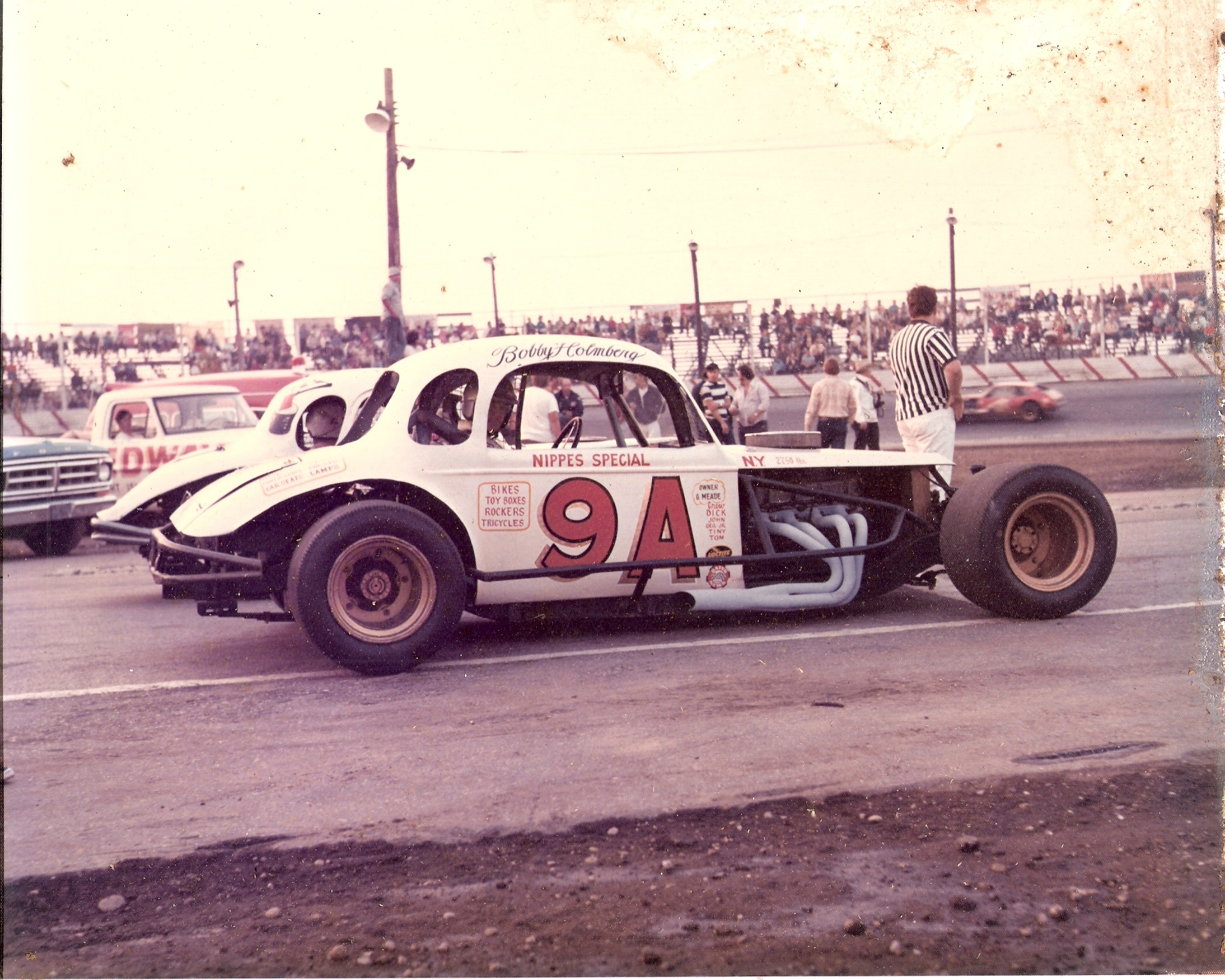
9A Modified driven by Bobby Holmberg at Islip Speedway.

== See also ==
- List of auto racing tracks in the United States
- Short track motor racing
