= 1965 Virginia 500 =

Auto race held at Martinsville Speedway in 1965

Race details
- Race 12 of 55 in the 1965 NASCAR Grand National Series season
- A map showing the layout of Martinsville Speedway
- Date: April 25, 1965
- Official name: Virginia 500
- Location: Martinsville Speedway, Martinsville, Virginia
- Course: Permanent racing facility
- Course length: 0.525 miles (0.844 km)
- Distance: 500 laps, 262.5 mi (442.4 km)
- Weather: Cold with temperatures of 57 °F (14 °C); wind speeds of 8.9 miles per hour (14.3 km/h)
- Average speed: 66.735 mph (107.400 km/h)
- Attendance: 10,000

Pole position
Driver	Junior Johnson	Junior Johnson & Associates
- Time: 24.160 seconds

Most laps led
Driver	Fred Lorenzen	Holman-Moody
- Laps: 338

Winner
No. 28	Fred Lorenzen	Holman-Moody

Television in the United States
- Network: untelevised
- Announcers: none

The 1965 Virginia 500 was a NASCAR Grand National Series event that was held on April 25, 1965, at Martinsville Speedway in Martinsville, Virginia.

Fred Lorenzen, the winning driver of this race, would become the only driver to win four consecutive Martinsville races.

== Background ==
Martinsville Speedway is one of five short tracks to hold NASCAR races. The standard track at Martinsville Speedway is a four-turn short track oval that is 0.526 miles (0.847 km) long. The track's turns are banked at eleven degrees, while the front stretch, the location of the finish line, is banked at zero degrees. The back stretch also has a zero degree banking.

The track was also one of the first paved oval tracks in NASCAR, being built in 1947 by partners H. Clay Earles, Henry Lawrence and Sam Rice per Virginia House Joint Resolution No. 76 on the death of H. Clay Earles. (Whereas Clay Earles and his partners, Sam Rice and Henry Lawrence, opened the Martinsville Speedway in 1947 on a 30-acre site, one of the first of its kind in the nation ...) It is also the only race track that has been on the NASCAR circuit from its beginning in 1948. Along with this, Martinsville is the only NASCAR oval track on the entire NASCAR track circuit to have asphalt surfaces on the straightaways, then concrete to cover the turns.

== Race report ==
The racing event (in what is now known as the Monster Energy NASCAR Cup Series) took approximately three hours and forty-four minutes to completely finish. Five cautions were handed out by NASCAR officials for forty-nine laps. Fred Lorenzen beat Marvin Panch by two car lengths in front of ten thousand people. Curtis Crider retired from NASCAR after competing in this race. Most of the contenders in the race were driving Ford vehicles with the model years ranging from 1963 through 1965. Terry Murchinson had a clutch problem with his unsponsored 1964 Ford Galaxie after only two laps of racing and became the last-place finisher of the day. Jabe Thomas initially qualified in 11th position, withdrew from the event due to engine problem.

Total winnings of the race were $20,725 ($211,736 when adjusted for inflation). Each driver took home winnings between $4,350 ($44,442 when adjusted for inflation) and $250 ($2,554 when adjusted for inflation) on an individual basis. The transition to purpose-built racecars began in the early 1960s and occurred gradually over that decade. Changes made to the sport by the late 1960s brought an end to the "strictly stock" vehicles of the 1950s.

Ford ended up dominating NASCAR in 1965. This came about because Dodge discouraged their vehicles from participating in the league due to the Hemi engine being banned from competition. Petty Enterprises ended up going into drag racing until Dodge solved its issues with the people who ran NASCAR at that time. All but one of the top ten finishers drove a Ford vehicle; the sixth-place finisher drove a Dodge (which no longer races in the NASCAR Cup Series as of 2013).

Notable crew chiefs for this race include Don Snyder, Lanty McClung, Herb Nab, and John Ervin.

=== Qualifying ===
Grid	No.	Driver	Manufacturer	Qualifying time	Speed
1	26	Junior Johnson	'65 Ford	24.160	74.503
2	28	Fred Lorenzen	'65 Ford	24.220	74.318
3	21	Marvin Panch	'65 Ford	24.220	74.318
4	7	Bobby Johns	'65 Ford	24.320	73.952
5	29	Dick Hutcherson	'65 Ford	24.520	73.409
6	11	Ned Jarrett	'65 Ford	24.720	72.756
7	49	G.C. Spencer	'64 Ford	24.830	72.492
8	59	Tom Pistone	'64 Ford	24.900	72.289
9	76	Larry Frank	'64 Ford	24.940	72.173
10	90	Sonny Hutchins	'64 Ford	25.160	71.542
11	17	Jabe Thomas	'64 Ford	25.200	71.428
12	67	Junior Spencer	'64 Dodge	25.310	71.118
13	64	Buddy Arrington	'64 Ford	25.400	70.810
14	34	Elmo Langley	'63 Ford	25.570	70.394
15	53	Wendell Scott	'64 Ford	25.580	70.367

== Finishing order ==
Section reference:

1. Fred Lorenzen (No. 28)
2. Marvin Panch (No. 21)
3. Dick Hutcherson† (No. 29)
4. Tiny Lund† (No. 10)
5. Buddy Arrington (No. 67)
6. Elmo Langley† (No. 64)
7. Paul Lewis (No. 27)
8. Doug Cooper* (No. 60)
9. Buren Skeen† (No. 23)
10. Ned Jarrett (No. 11)
11. Bob Derrington (No. 68)
12. G.C. Spencer*† (No. 49)
13. Henley Gray (No. 97)
14. Clyde Lynn† (No. 20)
15. Darel Dieringer*† (No. 37)
16. Wendell Scott† (No. 34)
17. Curtis Crider* (No. 53)
18. Cale Yarborough (No. 31)
19. Roy Tyner*† (No. 9)
20. Larry Frank*† (No. 76)
21. Donald Tucker (No. 74)
22. Junior Johnson* (No. 26)
23. Tom Pistone* (No. 59)
24. Bud Harless*† (No. 40)
25. Sonny Hutchins*† (No. 90)
26. Bobby Johns* (No. 7)
27. Gene Hobby* (No. 99)
28. Buck Baker*† (No. 87)
29. Larry Manning* (No. 8)
30. Neil Castles* (No. 86)
31. Junior Spencer* (No. 17)
32. G.T. Nolen* (No. 80)
33. Bill Morton* (No. 56)
34. E.J. Trivette* (No. 52)
35. Buddy Baker*† (No. 88)
36. Terry Murchison* (No. 0)

† signifies that the driver is known to be deceased
^{*} denotes that the driver did not finish the race

== Timeline ==
Section reference:

- Start of race: Junior Johnson officially began the race with the pole position.
- Lap 61: Fred Lorenzen took over the lead from Junior Johnson.
- Lap 74: Bobby Johns took over the lead from Fred Lorenzen.
- Lap 89: Fred Lorenzen took over the lead from Bobby Johns.
- Lap 92: Bobby Johns took over the lead from Fred Lorenzen.
- Lap 93: Junior Johnson took over the lead from Bobby Johns.
- Lap 179: Fred Lorenzen took over the lead from Junior Johnson.
- Lap 344: Larry Frank fell out with engine failure while racing at competitive speeds.
- Lap 362: Transmission issues forced Roy Tyner to exit the race prematurely.
- Lap 390: Curtis Crider had to leave the race due to crankshaft issues.
- Lap 404: Darel Dieringer fell out with engine failure while racing at competitive speeds.
- Lap 432: G.C. Spencer had a terminal crash, forcing him to retire from the race.
- Lap 468: Doug Cooper fell out with engine failure while racing at competitive speeds.
- Finish: Fred Lorenzen was officially declared the winner of the event.

Preceded by 1965 Gwyn Staley 400	NASCAR Grand National Series season 1965	Succeeded by 1965 Columbia 200
