= Tiny Lund =

American racing driver (1929–1975)

- Lund c. 1965-1966
- Born: DeWayne Louis Lund; November 14, 1929; Harlan, Iowa, U.S.
- Died: August 17, 1975 (aged 45); Lincoln, Alabama, U.S.
- Cause of death: Racing accident at Talladega
- Achievements: 1973 NASCAR Grand National East Series Champion; 1968, 1970, 1971 Grand American Champion; 1963 Daytona 500 Winner; 1970 Daytona Permatex 300 Winner
- Awards: International Motorsports Hall of Fame (1994); Named one of NASCAR's 50 Greatest Drivers (1998); National Dirt Late Model Hall of Fame (2016); Named one of NASCAR's 75 Greatest Drivers (2023)

NASCAR Cup Series career
- 303 races run over 20 years
- Best finish: 10th (1963)
- First race: 1955 LeHi 300 (LeHi)
- Last race: 1975 Talladega 500 (Talladega)
- First win: 1963 Daytona 500 (Daytona)
- Last win: 1971 Wilkes 400 (North Wilkesboro)
| Wins | Top tens | Poles |
|---|---|---|
| 5 | 119 | 6 |

NASCAR Grand National East Series career
- 25 races run over 2 years
- Best finish: 1st (1973)
- First race: 1972 Bold City 200 (Jacksonville)
- Last race: 1973 Buddy Shuman 100 (Hickory)
- First win: 1973 Selinsgrove 100 (Selinsgrove)
- Last win: 1973 Buddy Shuman 100 (Hickory)
| Wins | Top tens | Poles |
|---|---|---|
| 5 | 15 | 3 |
- Statistics up to date as of October 27, 2013.

DeWayne Louis "Tiny" Lund (November 14, 1929 – August 17, 1975) was an American stock car racer. He was a journeyman racer-for-hire in the top level NASCAR Grand National Series, running partial seasons for a number of years, including a victory in the 1963 Daytona 500. Lund saw his greatest success in the NASCAR Grand American Series, where he was the season champion in three of the four full years the series was run – Lund won 41 of the 109 Grand American events that ran.

Lund was 6 feet 5 inches tall and weighed about 270 lbs., earning the ironic nickname "Tiny".

== Background ==
Lund started racing at a young age on a motorcycle, then moved up to midget cars and sprint cars. He served in the Korean War in the United States Air Force, and in 1955 decided to try stock car racing in NASCAR.

== Early NASCAR years ==
Lund went south with a 1955 Chevrolet and competed in the LeHi, Arkansas, event, with sponsorship from Carl Rupert and his safety belt company. Lund qualified mid-pack but his event ended in an accident on lap 65. Lund's car flipped end over end and his safety belt broke. He was bruised and had a broken arm.

For 1956, Lund teamed up with Gus Holzmueller, and their best result was a fourth-place finish in Columbia, South Carolina. Lund also ran a few events for A. L. Bumgarner.

In 1957, Lund split his time between Bumgarner's Pontiacs and a Petty Enterprises Oldsmobile. With Bumgarner, Lund controlled the majority of an event at the Cleveland County Fairgrounds short dirt track in Shelby, North Carolina. He won the pole position, and led 136 (of 200) laps when his right rear axle gave out with 14 laps left. Lund had two other poles on the season. Late in the 1957 season at the North Wilkesboro Speedway, a wheel from Lund's car was thrown into stands, and a spectator was killed.

Lund left Bumgarner and continued his journeyman driving in 1958, winning the pole position at races in Gastonia and Hillsboro. In 1959 he fielded self-owned Chevrolets. Lund did not have major success, and he was without rides by 1963.

== 1963 Daytona 500 ==
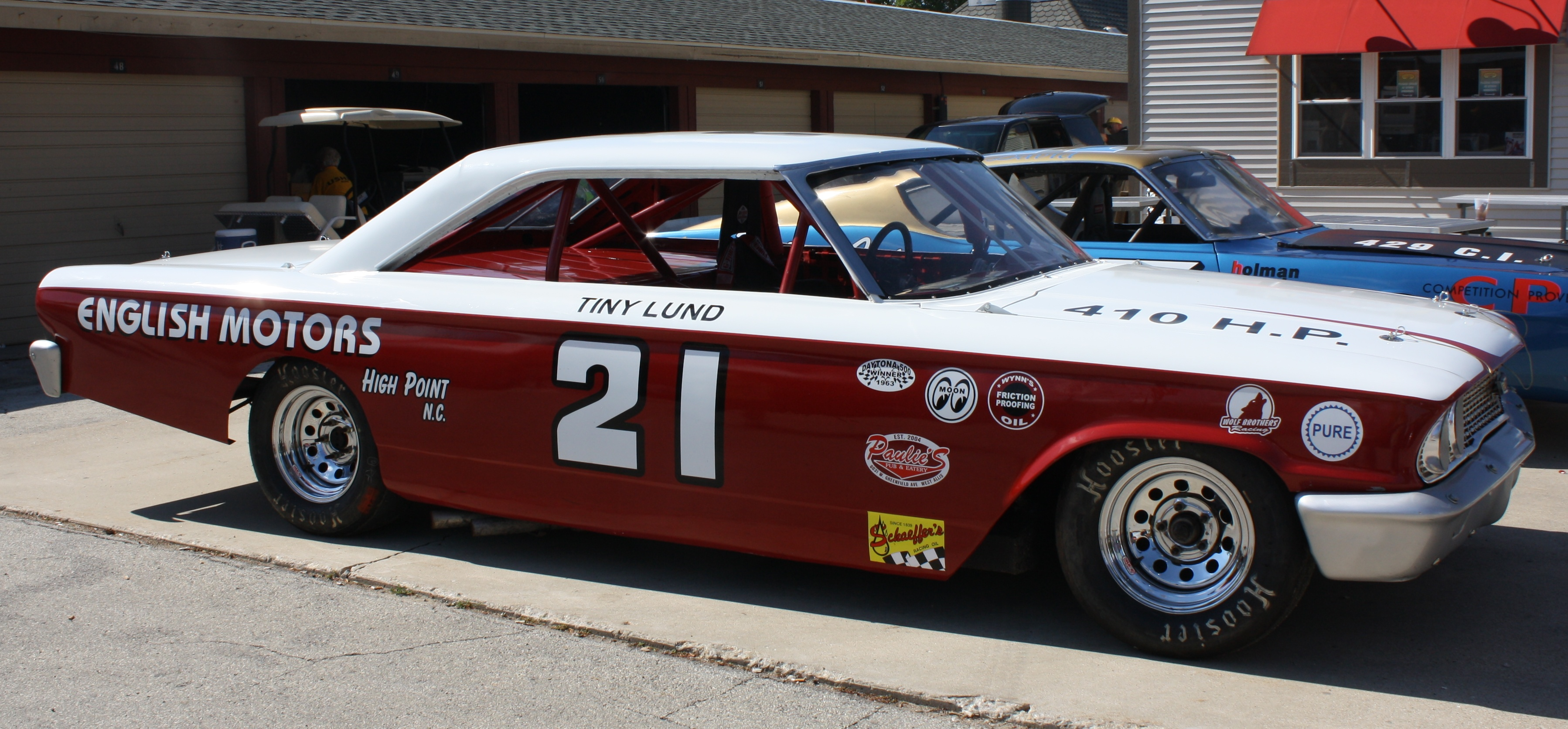
1963 Tiny Lund/Wood Brothers NASCAR car or replica

In February 1963, Lund went to Daytona International Speedway shopping around for any ride in that year's Daytona 500. Lund's friend Marvin Panch, the driver for the Wood Brothers racing team, had an accident while testing an experimental Ford-powered Maserati for the Daytona Continental three-hour sportscar race (a precursor to the 24 Hours of Daytona). When Panch's car burst into flames, Lund ran into the inferno and pulled Panch out of the wreckage. For his actions, Lund was awarded the Carnegie Hero's Medal.

Panch, in hospital, asked Lund to take his ride in the Wood Brothers Racing entry. Lund was fourth fastest in individual qualifying trials, and finished sixth in the second qualifying race, starting the race from 12th on the grid. The start of the race was delayed due to heavy rains, and then the first 10 laps were run under caution. As the green flag waved, Lund worked his way through the field. The Wood Brothers team had a winning strategy for the race – they planned to complete the race on one fuel stop less than the field. Lund managed to take the lead very late in the race. Lorenzen passed Lund with 10 laps left to go, but ran out of gas and had to make a pit stop. Then Ned Jarrett made the pass on Lund for the top spot but with three laps to go he also ran out of gas. Lund's car ran out of fuel on the final lap, but he managed to coast home to win the 1963 Daytona 500.

== Return to journeyman ==
Lund's victory revived what had been a dwindling career. He stayed in the Wood Brothers Ford for several 1963 races after Daytona, and holding a late lead in the Southeastern 500 before his motor gave out. Marvin Panch returned to the Wood Brothers and Lund was without a ride. Holman-Moody gave him a car for several of the bigger races, though without success, at the Dixie 400, Firecracker 400 and World 600.

For 1964, Lund hooked up with a series of lesser known owners, at one point leading in the Columbia 200 but dropped out due to overheating. Late in the year, he settled in with driving for Lyle Stelter, continued as his driver into the 1965 season. Lund earned his second career Grand National victory in the 1965 Columbia 200, qualifying in fourth and taking the lead from Ned Jarrett before rains came and washed out the second half of the event. In 1966, he continued his partnership with Stelter. Lund lead races at Spartanburg and Manassas, dropping out of both races with mechanical problems (two of the 21 races he did not finish that season), before earning his third career win at Beltsville Speedway.

For 1967, Lund teamed once again with Stelter for the majority of the year but it was with Petty Enterprises in the No. 42 Plymouth that he had most of his success. Lund finished fourth in the Daytona 500 despite running out of fuel with a lap to go. Lund finished fifth in the World 600 for Petty Enterprises. He struggled in Stelter's Fords despite a promising run in Fonda, New York, where he qualified second and led some laps before an axle broke. Lund and Stelter parted at season's end. For 1968, he teamed with Bud Moore and his Mercurys, finishing fifth in the Firecracker 400 and fourth in Rockingham during his shortened Grand National season.

In 1968, Lund appeared as one of the race drivers in the racing scene of the MGM movie Speedway which starred Elvis Presley and Nancy Sinatra. In 1969, Lund entered one Grand National race, guesting for Bill France Sr. in the inaugural Talladega 500. The race is known for a drivers' boycott over tire safety protests. Lund drove into the lead but his clutch failed and he was classified ninth.

== Success in Grand American series ==
From 1968 through 1971, Lund earned his greatest racing successes in the new NASCAR Grand American Series, winning 41 of the 109 Grand American races from 1968 through 1971. The series was designed for pony cars like Ford Mustangs, Chevrolet Camaros and Mercury Cougars.

Lund drove a Cougar for the Bud Moore team in 1968, winning the inaugural season championship.

Lund would win back-to-back Grand American championships in 1970 and 1971, driving a Camaro for the Ronnie Hopkins team.

Lund "won" two Grand National events in 1971 – both times driving his Grand American pony car. As the number of entrants for some of the smaller Grand National races were low (only 14 cars entered the 1971 Space City 300), NASCAR decided to allow Grand American cars to fill out the remaining spots at six Grand National races later in the year. Three of these Grand National races were won by drivers in Grand American cars; Lund drove the Camaro to victory in the Buddy Shuman 276 and the Wilkes 400, while Bobby Allison drove a Mustang to victory in the Myers Brothers 250. The flat tracks at the Shuman and Myers events favored the smaller pony cars, while Lund won the Wilkes event when Richard Petty's Grand National car had problems late in the race. Neither of these victories were added to Lund's official win tally—NASCAR had dictated, pre-races, that if a Grand American car won it would not be credited with a Grand National victory; first place points would not be awarded. Despite this, the wins were counted as constructor's victories for Chevrolet and starts for Lund.

Greg Fielden and Peter Golenbock's Stock Car Racing Encyclopedia has credited Lund with the two victories, bringing his career Grand National total to five. This also has disputed the win total between Bobby Allison and Darrell Waltrip, both of whom are tied at 84, though Allison has always claimed that he has 85 Grand National wins. This also would technically dispute Charlie Glotzbach, Richard Petty and Elmo Langley's win totals. If, as NASCAR did with other combined division races, wins were awarded based on classes similar to sportscar racing and regional series (K&N Pro Series currently), Petty would have a 201st win (in the same Grand American win for Allison), Langley a third win (1971 at Hickory; Lund in a Grand American), and Glotzbach a second win (1971 at North Wilkesboro; Lund in a Grand American) based on winning the Grand National class.

The Grand American series folded during 1972, after just six races – the new Grand National East Division emerged later that year. Lund moved to the new series and the existing NASCAR Late Model Sportsman Series.

Lund won the Sportsman season opener at Daytona twice and continued to rack up victories on short tracks that he had raced on as a youth.

== Death at Talladega ==
In 1975, Lund entered an A. J. King Dodge in the Talladega 500 of the top level (renamed) Winston Cup Series. Lund qualified as first alternate; when Grant Adcox's car was withdrawn from the event, Lund was in and after a short track event that Saturday was flown down in Bobby Allison's private airplane.

The race was delayed a week by heavy rains, finally running on August 17. On the seventh lap, Lund and J. D. McDuffie collided on the backstretch. Other cars start to scramble as Lund’s Dodge and McDuffie's Chevy spun out. Subsequently, Terry Link slammed broadside into Lund's driver's side door, the impact knocking him unconscious and his Pontiac bursting into flames. Two spectators in the infield climbed over the catchfence, and with help from driver Walter Ballard, pulled Link from his car and was able to revive him.

Meanwhile, Lund was extricated from his own car by track rescue teams. He died later at the track infield hospital of massive chest and internal crush injuries. Drivers were not informed of Lund's death until the race was over. Lund was 45.

== Aftermath ==
Buddy Baker was victorious in that Talladega 500 in a Bud Moore Ford, but there was no celebration as he walked away to be by himself for a few minutes upon hearing of Lund's passing.

Lund was survived by his wife, Wanda, and son, Christopher.

== Awards and legacy ==
Lund was inducted into the International Motorsports Hall of Fame in 1994, and in 1998 named one of NASCAR's 50 Greatest Drivers.

Lund was inducted into the Motorsports Hall of Fame of America on March 17, 2020.

There is a Tiny Lund Grandstand at Daytona International Speedway, and in his hometown of Harlan, Iowa, there is a local dirt-track International Motor Contest Association (IMCA) Modified race, the Tiny Lund Memorial, with over 200 entries annually for this popular event. The movie Short track (2008) is dedicated to his memory.

== Motorsports career results ==
=== NASCAR ===
(key) (Bold – Pole position awarded by qualifying time. Italics – Pole position earned by points standings or practice time. * – Most laps led.)

==== Grand National Series ====
NASCAR Grand National Series results
| Year | Team | No. | Make | 1 | 2 | 3 | 4 | 5 | 6 | 7 | 8 | 9 | 10 | 11 | 12 | 13 | 14 | 15 | 16 | 17 | 18 | 19 | 20 | 21 | 22 | 23 | 24 | 25 | 26 | 27 | 28 | 29 | 30 | 31 | 32 | 33 | 34 | 35 | 36 | 37 | 38 | 39 | 40 | 41 | 42 | 43 | 44 | 45 | 46 | 47 | 48 | 49 | 50 | 51 | 52 | 53 | 54 | 55 | 56 | 57 | 58 | 59 | 60 | 61 | 62 | NGNC | Pts | Ref |
|---|---|---|---|---|---|---|---|---|---|---|---|---|---|---|---|---|---|---|---|---|---|---|---|---|---|---|---|---|---|---|---|---|---|---|---|---|---|---|---|---|---|---|---|---|---|---|---|---|---|---|---|---|---|---|---|---|---|---|---|---|---|---|---|---|---|---|---|---|
| 1955 | Carl Rupert | 37 | Chevy | TCS | PBS | JSP | DAB | OSP | CLB | HBO | NWS | MGY | LAN | CLT | HCY | ASF | TUS | MAR | RCH | NCF | FOR | LIN | MCF | FON | AIR | CLT | PIF | CLB | AWS | MOR | ALS | NYF | SAN | CLT | FOR | MAS | RSP | DAR | MGY | LAN | RSP | GPS | MAS; 25 | CLB | MAR | LVP | NWS | HBO | | | | | | | | | | | | | | | | | | 217th | - | |
| 1956 | Gus Holzmueller | 37 | Pontiac | HCY | CLT | WSS | PBS | ASF | DAB | PBS | WIL; 11 | ATL | NWS; 14 | LAN; 30 | | CLB; 4 | CON; 6 | GPS; 9 | HCY; 14 | HBO | | | | | | | | | | | | | | | | | | | | | | | | | | | | | | | | | | | | | | | | | | | | | | 19th | 2754 | |
| 1956 | A.L. Bumgarner | 55 | Pontiac | | | | | | | | | | | | RCH; 13 | | | | | | MAR; 12 | LIN | CLT | POR | EUR | NYF | MER | MAS | CLT | MCF | POR | AWS | RSP | PIF | CSF | CHI | CCF | MGY | OKL | ROA | OBS | SAN | NOR | PIF | MYB | POR | | | | | | | | | | | | | | | | | | | | 19th | 2754 | |
| 1956 | Gus Holzmueller | 16 | Chevy | | | | | | | | | | | | | | | | | | | | | | | | | | | | | | | | | | | | | | | | | | | | DAR; 24 | CSH; 17 | CLT; 6 | LAN; 16 | POR | CLB; 14 | HBO; 10 | NWP; 10 | CLT; 9 | CCF; 13 | MAR; 20 | HCY; 7 | WIL; 19 | | | | | | | 19th | 2754 | |
| 1957 | Gus Holzmueller | 16 | Chevy | WSS | CON; 4 | | | | | | | | | | | | | | | | | | | | | | | | | | | | | | | | | | | | | | | | | | | | | | | | | | | | | | | | | | | | | 11th | 4848 | |
| 1957 | Petty Enterprises | 42A | Dodge | | | TIC; 6 | | | | | | | | | | | | | | | | | | | | | | | | | | | | | | | | | | | | | | | | | | | | | | | | | | | | | | | | | | | | 11th | 4848 | |
| 1957 | Petty Enterprises | 188 | Olds | | | | DAB; 44 | CON; 20 | WIL; 5 | HBO; 13 | AWS | | | | | | | | | | | | | | | | | | | | | | | | | | | | | | | | | | | | | | | | | | | | | | | | | | | | | | | 11th | 4848 | |
| 1957 | C.M. Julian | 431 | Dodge | | | | | | | | | NWS; 11 | | | | | | | | | | | | | | | | | | | | | | | | | | | | | | | | | | | | | | | | | | | | | | | | | | | | | | 11th | 4848 | |
| 1957 | Gus Holzmueller | 79 | Ford | | | | | | | | | | LAN; 11 | | | | | | | | | | | | | | | | | | | | | | | | | | | | | | | | | | | | | | | | | | | | | | | | | | | | | 11th | 4848 | |
| 1957 | A.L. Bumgarner | 55 | Pontiac | | | | | | | | | | | CLT; 18 | PIF; 6 | GBF; 13 | POR | **CCF**; 10* | RCH; 11 | MAR; 20 | POR | EUR | LIN; 8 | LCS; 12 | ASP | NWP; 7 | CLB; 8 | CPS | PIF; 21 | | RSP; 51 | **CLT**; 21 | MAS | POR | HCY; 17 | NOR; 6 | LCS; 9 | GLN; 3 | KPC | **LIN**; 3 | OBS | MYB | DAR; 20 | NYF | AWS | CSF | SCF | LAN; 32 | CLB | CCF | | | | | | | | | | | | | | | | 11th | 4848 | |
| 1957 | Rice Racing | 80 | Pontiac | | | | | | | | | | | | | | | | | | | | | | | | | | | JAC; 3 | | | | | | | | | | | | | | | | | | | | | | | | | NWS; 19 | GBF | | | | | | | | | | 11th | 4848 | |
| 1957 | Bob Welborn | 48 | Chevy | | | | | | | | | | | | | | | | | | | | | | | | | | | | | | | | | | | | | | | | | | | | | | | | CLT; 5 | | | | | | | | | | | | | | | 11th | 4848 | |
| 1957 | Bishop Brothers | 8 | Chevy | | | | | | | | | | | | | | | | | | | | | | | | | | | | | | | | | | | | | | | | | | | | | | | | | MAR; 10 | NBR | CON | | | | | | | | | | | | 11th | 4848 | |
| 1958 | Lonnie Fish | 76 | Chevy | FAY; 3 | | | | | | | | | | | | | | | | | | | | | | | | | | | | | | | | | | | | | | | | | | | | | | | | | | | | | | | | | | | | | | 25th | 2436 | |
| 1958 | Bob Welborn | 48 | Chevy | | DAB; 41 | CON | FAY | WIL | HBO | FAY | | | | | | | | | | | | | | | | | | | | | | | | | | | | | | | | | | | | | | | | | | | | | | | | | | | | | | | | 25th | 2436 | |
| 1958 | Don Angel | 37 | Ford | | | | | | | | CLB; 3 | PIF; 19 | ATL | CLT | MAR; 19 | ODS | OBS | GPS; 7 | GBF | STR | NWS | BGS | TRN | RSD | CLB | NBS | REF | LIN | HCY; 14 | AWS | | MCC; 13 | SLS | TOR | BUF | MCF | BEL | BRR | CLB; 16 | NSV | AWS; 11 | BGS; 8 | MBS; 4 | | CLT; 25 | | | | | | SAS; 10 | | | | | | | | | | | | | | | 25th | 2436 | |
| 1958 | A.L. Bumgarner | 55 | Pontiac | | | | | | | | | | | | | | | | | | | | | | | | | | | | RSP; 49 | | | | | | | | | | | | | | | | | | | | | | | | | | | | | | | | | | | 25th | 2436 | |
| 1958 | Jim Linke | 88 | Ford | | | | | | | | | | | | | | | | | | | | | | | | | | | | | | | | | | | | | | | | | DAR; 24 | | | | | | | | | | | | | | | | | | | | | | 25th | 2436 | |
| 1958 | Julian Petty | 48 | Chevy | | | | | | | | | | | | | | | | | | | | | | | | | | | | | | | | | | | | | | | | | | | BIR; 5 | CSF | **GAF**; 19 | RCH | | | MAR; 30 | | | | | | | | | | | | | | 25th | 2436 | |
| 1958 | Buck Baker Racing | 86 | Chevy | | | | | | | | | | | | | | | | | | | | | | | | | | | | | | | | | | | | | | | | | | | | | | | **HBO**; 25 | | | | | | | | | | | | | | | | 25th | 2436 | |
| 1958 | Tootle Estes | 36 | Ford | | | | | | | | | | | | | | | | | | | | | | | | | | | | | | | | | | | | | | | | | | | | | | | | | | NWS; 14 | ATL; 38 | | | | | | | | | | | | 25th | 2436 | |
| 1959 | Tommy Irwin | 36 | Ford | FAY; 7 | | | | | | | | | | | | | | | | | | | | | | | | | | | | | | | | | | | | | | | | | | | | | | | | | | | | | | | | | | | | | | 20th | 2634 | |
| 1959 | Buck Baker Racing | 88 | Chevy | | DAY; 7 | DAY; 40 | | | | | | | | | | | | | | | | | | | | | | | | | | | | | | | | | | | | | | | | | | | | | | | | | | | | | | | | | | | | 20th | 2634 | |
| 1959 | Buck Baker Racing | 89 | Chevy | | | | HBO; 14 | CON | | | | | | | | | | | | | | | | | | | | | | | | | | | | | | | | | | | | | | | | | | | | | | | | | | | | | | | | | | 20th | 2634 | |
| 1959 | Lund Racing | 5 | Chevy | | | | | | ATL; 9 | WIL; 17 | BGS | CLB; 4 | NWS; 4 | REF | HCY | MAR; 13 | TRN | CLT; 2 | NSV | ASP | PIF; 18 | GPS; 4 | ATL; 11 | CLB | WIL; 6 | RCH; 11 | BGS; 6 | AWS; 16 | DAY | HEI | CLT; 11 | MBS | CLT; 15 | | AWS; 14 | BGS | GPS; 12 | CLB; 2 | | | | | | | | | | | | | | | | | | | | | | | | | | | | 20th | 2634 | |
| 1959 | Julian Petty | 44 | Chevy | | | | | | | | | | | | | | | | | | | | | | | | | | | | | | | NSV; 28 | | | | | | | | | | | | | | | | | | | | | | | | | | | | | | | | 20th | 2634 | |
| 1959 | Spook Crawford | 20 | Ford | | | | | | | | | | | | | | | | | | | | | | | | | | | | | | | | | | | | DAR; 26 | HCY | RCH | CSF | HBO | MAR; 19 | AWS; 27 | NWS | CON; 11 | | | | | | | | | | | | | | | | | | | 20th | 2634 | |
| 1960 | Spook Crawford | 20 | Ford | CLT; 9 | | | | | | | | | | | | | | | | | | | | | | | | | | | | | | | | | | | | | | | | | | | | | | | | | | | | | | | | | | | | | | 32nd | 4124 | |
| 1960 | Lund Racing | 5 | Chevy | | CLB; 21 | | | | | | | | | | | | | | | | | | | | | | | | | | | | | | | | | | | | | | | | | | | | | | | | | | | | | | | | | | | | | 32nd | 4124 | |
| 1960 | Bill Gazaway | 45 | Olds | | | DAY; 29 | DAY | DAY; 51 | CLT | NWS | PHO | CLB | MAR | HCY | WIL | BGS | GPS | AWS | DAR | PIF | HBO | RCH | HMS | | | | | | | ATL; 30 | BIR | NSV | AWS | PIF | CLB | SBO | BGS | DAR; 19 | HCY | CSF | GSP | HBO | MAR | NWS | | | | | | | | | | | | | | | | | | | | | | 32nd | 4124 | |
| 1960 | Frank Skinner | 63 | Pontiac | | | | | | | | | | | | | | | | | | | | | CLT; 8 | BGS | DAY | HEI | MAB | MBS | | | | | | | | | | | | | | | | CLT; DNQ | RCH | | | | | | | | | | | | | | | | | | | | 32nd | 4124 | |
| 1960 | Donlavey Racing | 90 | Ford | | | | | | | | | | | | | | | | | | | | | | | | | | | | | | | | | | | | | | | | | | | | ATL; 36 | | | | | | | | | | | | | | | | | | | 32nd | 4124 | |
| 1961 | Fred Clark | 30 | Chevy | CLT | JSP | DAY | DAY | DAY | PIF | AWS | HMS | ATL | GPS | HBO | BGS | MAR | NWS | CLB | HCY | RCH | MAR | DAR | CLT | CLT | RSD | ASP | CLT; 6 | PIF | BIR | GPS | BGS | NOR | HAS | STR | | | | | | | | | | | | | | | ATL; 15 | MAR | NWS | | BRI; 22 | GPS | HBO | | | | | | | | | | | 23rd | 7740 | |
| 1961 | J.D. Braswell | 75 | Pontiac | | | | | | | | | | | | | | | | | | | | | | | | | | | | | | | | DAY; 20 | ATL; 30 | | | BRI; 10 | NSV | BGS | AWS | RCH | SBO | | | | | | | | | | | | | | | | | | | | | | 23rd | 7740 | |
| 1961 | Pete Boland | 63 | Ford | | | | | | | | | | | | | | | | | | | | | | | | | | | | | | | | | | CLB; 13 | MBS; 15 | | | | | | | | | | | | | | | | | | | | | | | | | | | | 23rd | 7740 | |
| 1961 | B.G. Holloway | 59 | Pontiac | | | | | | | | | | | | | | | | | | | | | | | | | | | | | | | | | | | | | | | | | | DAR; 15 | HCY | RCH | CSF | | | | | | | | | | | | | | | | | | 23rd | 7740 | |
| 1961 | J.L. Cheatham | 96 | Chevy | | | | | | | | | | | | | | | | | | | | | | | | | | | | | | | | | | | | | | | | | | | | | | | | | CLT; 15 | | | | | | | | | | | | | | 23rd | 7740 | |
| 1962 | Fred Clark | 30 | Chevy | CON | AWS | DAY | DAY | DAY | CON | AWS | SVH | HBO | RCH | CLB | NWS | GPS | MBS | MAR | BGS | BRI; 24 | RCH | HCY | CON | DAR | PIF | CLT; 19 | ATL; 15 | BGS | AUG | RCH | SBO | DAY | CLB | ASH | GPS | | | | | | | | | | | | | DAR; 19 | HCY | RCH | DTS | AUG | | | | | | | | | | | | | | 34th | 4384 | |
| 1962 | Lewis Osborne | 96 | Chevy | | | | | | | | | | | | | | | | | | | | | | | | | | | | | | | | | AUG; 16 | | | | | | | | | | | | | | | | | | | | | | | | | | | | | | 34th | 4384 | |
| 1962 | Paul Lewis | 96 | Chevy | | | | | | | | | | | | | | | | | | | | | | | | | | | | | | | | | | SVH; 13 | MBS | BRI | CHT | NSV | HUN | AWS | STR | BGS | PIF | VAL | | | | | | | | | | | | | | | | | | | 34th | 4384 | |
| 1962 | Fred Clark | 58 | Chevy | | | | | | | | | | | | | | | | | | | | | | | | | | | | | | | | | | | | | | | | | | | | | | | | | | MAR; 12 | NWS; 25 | | | | | | | | | | | | 34th | 4384 | |
| 1962 | Cliff Stewart Racing | 12 | Pontiac | | | | | | | | | | | | | | | | | | | | | | | | | | | | | | | | | | | | | | | | | | | | | | | | | | | | CLT; 27 | ATL; 19 | | | | | | | | | | 34th | 4384 | |
| 1963 | Wood Brothers | 21 | Ford | BIR | GGS | THS | RSD | DAY | DAY; 6 | DAY; 1 | PIF | AWS | HBO | ATL; 5 | HCY | BRI; 14 | | | | | | MAR; 2 | NWS; 3 | CLB | THS | DAR; 4 | ODS | RCH | | | | | | | | | | | | | | | | | | | | | | | | | | | | | | | | | | | | | | 10th | 19624 | |
| 1963 | Ed Livingston | 68 | Ford | | | | | | | | | | | | | | AUG; 15 | RCH | GPS | SBO | BGS | | | | | | | | | | | | | | | | | | | | | | | | | | | | | | | | | | | | | | | | | | | | | 10th | 19624 | |
| 1963 | Stewart McKinney | 44 | Ford | | | | | | | | | | | | | | | | | | | | | | | | | | CLT; 12 | BIR | | | | | | | | | | | | | | | | | | | | | | | | | | | | | | | | | | | | 10th | 19624 | |
| 1963 | Holman-Moody | 0 | Ford | | | | | | | | | | | | | | | | | | | | | | | | | | | | ATL; 27 | DAY; 10 | MBS | SVH | DTS | BGS | ASH | OBS | BRR | BRI; 7 | | | | | | | | DAR; 8 | | | | | | | CLT; 21 | SBO | | | | | | | | | | 10th | 19624 | |
| 1963 | Dave Kent | 32 | Ford | | | | | | | | | | | | | | | | | | | | | | | | | | | | | | | | | | | | | | GPS; 7 | NSV; 15 | CLB | AWS | PIF | BGS | ONA | | HCY; 11 | RCH; 9 | MAR | DTS; 14 | NWS; 9 | | | | HBO; 23 | RSD | | | | | | | | 10th | 19624 | |
| 1963 | Dave Kent | 53 | Ford | | | | | | | | | | | | | | | | | | | | | | | | | | | | | | | | | | | | | | | | | | | | | | | | | | | THS; 17 | | | | | | | | | | | | 10th | 19624 | |
| 1964 | Dave Kent | 32 | Ford | CON; 10 | AUG; 12 | JSP; 12 | SVH; 3 | RSD; 15 | | | | | | | | | | | | | | | | | | | | | | | | | | | | | | | | | | | | | | | | | | | | | | | | | | | | | | | | | | 20th | 12598 | |
| 1964 | Graham Shaw | 32 | Ford | | | | | | DAY; 6 | DAY | DAY; 11 | RCH; 19 | BRI; 18 | | | | | | | | | | | | | | | | | | | | | | | | | | | | | | | | | | | | | | | | | | | | | | | | | | | | | 20th | 12598 | |
| 1964 | Herman Beam | 19 | Ford | | | | | | | | | | | GPS; 5 | BGS | | | | | | | | | | | | | | | | | | | | | | | | | | | | | | | | | | | | | | | | | | | | | | | | | | | 20th | 12598 | |
| 1964 | David Walker | 35 | Plymouth | | | | | | | | | | | | | ATL; 6 | AWS | | | | | | | | | | | | | | | | | | | | | | | | | | | | | | | | | | | | | | | | | | | | | | | | | 20th | 12598 | |
| 1964 | Graham Shaw | 98 | Ford | | | | | | | | | | | | | | | HBO; 18 | PIF | CLB; 19 | NWS | MAR | SVH | | | | | | | | | | | | | | | | | | | | | | | | | | | | | | | | | | | | | | | | | | | 20th | 12598 | |
| 1964 | David Walker | 89 | Plymouth | | | | | | | | | | | | | | | | | | | | | DAR; 20 | LGY | HCY | SBO | CLT | GPS | ASH | ATL; 25 | CON | NSV | CHT | BIR | VAL; 3 | PIF | DAY; 21 | ODS | OBS | BRR | ISP | GLN | LIN | BRI | NSV | MBS | AWS | DTS | ONA | CLB | BGS | STR | | | | | | | | | | | | | 20th | 12598 | |
| 1964 | Lyle Stelter | 55 | Ford | | | | | | | | | | | | | | | | | | | | | | | | | | | | | | | | | | | | | | | | | | | | | | | | | | | DAR; 33 | | RCH; 31 | ODS | HBO | MAR | SVH | NWS | CLT; DNQ | HAR | AUG; 8 | JAC; 9 | 20th | 12598 | |
| 1964 | Lyle Stelter | 5 | Ford | | | | | | | | | | | | | | | | | | | | | | | | | | | | | | | | | | | | | | | | | | | | | | | | | | | | HCY; 7 | | | | | | | | | | | 20th | 12598 | |
| 1965 | Lyle Stelter | 55 | Ford | RSD | DAY; 13 | DAY | DAY; 29 | PIF; 9 | ASW; 10 | RCH; 14 | HBO | ATL; 6 | GPS; 23 | | | CLB; 1* | BRI | DAR; 8 | LGY; 20 | BGS | HCY | CLT | CCF | ASH | HAR | NSV | BIR | ATL | GPS | MBS; 3* | VAL; 16 | DAY; 11 | ODS | OBS; 7 | ISP; 6 | GLN; 5 | BRI; 24 | NSV | CCF | AWS | SMR | PIF; 11 | AUG; 19 | CLB; 4 | DTS; 4 | BLV; 2 | BGS | DAR; 39 | HCY; 9 | LIN; 24 | ODS; 4 | RCH; 33 | | | | | | | | | | | | | | 21st | 12820 | |
| 1965 | Gary Weaver | 10 | Ford | | | | | | | | | | | NWS; 9 | MAR; 4 | | | | | | | | | | | | | | | | | | | | | | | | | | | | | | | | | | | | | | MAR; 8 | NWS | CLT | HBO | CAR | DTS | | | | | | | | 21st | 12820 | |
| 1966 | Lyle Stelter | 55 | Ford | AUG; 20* | RSD; 34 | | | | | | ATL; 9 | HCY; 18 | CLB; 24 | **GPS**; 3 | BGS | NWS | MAR | DAR; 31 | LGY; 21 | MGR | MON; 20 | RCH; 24 | CLT; 26 | DTS; 2 | ASH | PIF; 8* | SMR; 20 | AWS; 15 | BLV; 1* | GPS; 10 | | ODS; 16 | BRR; 7 | OXF; 2 | | ISP; 23 | BRI | SMR | NSV | | CLB; 18 | AWS | BLV; 5 | BGS | | | | | | | CLT; 28 | CAR; 44 | | | | | | | | | | | | | | 29th | 9332 | |
| 1966 | Gary Weaver | 10 | Ford | | | DAY; 25 | DAY | DAY; DNQ | | | | | | | | | | | | | | | | | | | | | | | | | | | | | | | | | | | | | | | | | | | | | | | | | | | | | | | | | | 29th | 9332 | |
| 1966 | Larry DeBeau | 10 | Ford | | | | | | CAR; 22 | BRI | | | | | | | | | | | | | | | | | | | | | | | | | | | | | | | | | | | | | | | | | | | | | | | | | | | | | | | | 29th | 9332 | |
| 1966 | Betty Lilly | 24 | Ford | | | | | | | | | | | | | | | | | | | | | | | | | | | | DAY; 8 | | | | | | | | | ATL; 36 | | | | | DAR; 28 | HCY | RCH | HBO | MAR | NWS | | | | | | | | | | | | | | | | 29th | 9332 | |
| 1966 | Lyle Stelter | 15 | Ford | | | | | | | | | | | | | | | | | | | | | | | | | | | | | | | | FON; 25 | | | | | | | | | | | | | | | | | | | | | | | | | | | | | | | 29th | 9332 | |
| 1967 | Lyle Stelter | 55 | Ford | AUG; 5 | RSD | | | | | | | | | | | | | | | | | | | | | | | | | | | TRN; 30 | OXF; 17 | FDA; 16 | ISP; 13 | BRI | SMR | NSV | ATL | BGS | CLB; 15 | SVH | DAR; 40 | HCY | RCH | BLV; 24 | HBO; 16 | MAR | NWS | CLT | CAR; 8 | AWS | | | | | | | | | | | | | | 19th | 16292 | |
| 1967 | Petty Enterprises | 42 | Plymouth | | | DAY; 5 | DAY | DAY; 4 | AWS | BRI | GPS | BGS | ATL; 20 | | | | | | | | | | CLT; 5 | ASH | MGR | SMR | BIR | | | | | | | | | | | | | | | | | | | | | | | | | | | | | | | | | | | | | | | 19th | 16292 | |
| 1967 | Don Culpepper | 76 | Ford | | | | | | | | | | | CLB; 12 | HCY | NWS; 15 | MAR; 15 | SVH | RCH | DAR | BLV | LGY | | | | | | | | | | | | | | | | | | | | | | | | | | | | | | | | | | | | | | | | | | | | 19th | 16292 | |
| 1967 | Turkey Minton | 74 | Chevy | | | | | | | | | | | | | | | | | | | | | | | | | CAR; 32 | GPS | MGY; 16 | DAY | | | | | | | | | | | | | | | | | | | | | | | | | | | | | | | | | | | 19th | 16292 | |
| 1968 | Lyle Stelter | 55 | Ford | MGR; 3 | MGY | RSD | | | | | | | | | | | | | | | | | | | | | | | | | | | | | | | | | | | | | | | | | | | | | | | | | | | | | | | | | | | | 22nd | 1443 | |
| 1968 | Bud Moore Engineering | 16 | Mercury | | | | DAY; 9 | BRI; 28 | RCH | ATL; 12 | HCY | | | | MAR; 7 | AUG | AWS | DAR; 32 | BLV | LGY | CLT; 7 | ASH | MGR; 5 | SMR | BIR | CAR; 27 | GPS | DAY; 5 | ISP | OXF | FDA | TRN | BRI; 8 | SMR | NSV | ATL; 17 | | | | | | DAR; 29 | HCY | RCH | BLV | HBO | MAR | NWS | AUG | CLT | CAR; 4 | JFC | | | | | | | | | | | | | | 22nd | 1443 | |
| 1968 | Lyle Stelter | 56 | Ford | | | | | | | | | GPS; 5 | CLB | NWS | | | | | | | | | | | | | | | | | | | | | | | | | | | | | | | | | | | | | | | | | | | | | | | | | | | | 22nd | 1443 | |
| 1968 | Don Culpepper | 76 | Ford | | | | | | | | | | | | | | | | | | | | | | | | | | | | | | | | | | CLB; 6 | BGS | AWS; 23 | SBO | LGY | | | | | | | | | | | | | | | | | | | | | | | | | 22nd | 1443 | |
| 1969 | Bill France | 53 | Ford | MGR | MGY | RSD | DAY | DAY | DAY | CAR | AUG | BRI | ATL | CLB | HCY | GPS | RCH | NWS | MAR | AWS | DAR | BLV | LGY | CLT | MGR | SMR | MCH | KPT | GPS | NCF | DAY | DOV | TPN | TRN | BLV | BRI | NSV | SMR | ATL | MCH | SBO | BGS | AWS | DAR | HCY | RCH | TAL; 9 | CLB | MAR | NWS | CLT | SVH | AUG | CAR | JFC | MGR | TWS | | | | | | | | | NA | 0 | |
| 1970 | McConnell Racing | 55 | Dodge | RSD | DAY | DAY; 4 | DAY; 13 | RCH | CAR | SVH | ATL | BRI | TAL | NWS | CLB | DAR | BLV | LGY | CLT; 4 | SMR | MAR | MCH | RSD | HCY | KPT | GPS | DAY | AST | TPN | TRN | BRI | SMR | NSV | ATL | CLB | ONA | MCH | TAL; 39 | BGS | SBO | DAR | HCY | RCH | DOV | NCF | NWS | CLT | MAR | MGR | CAR; 35 | LGY | | | | | | | | | | | | | | | NA | 0 | |
| 1971 | McConnell Racing | 55 | Dodge | RSD | DAY; 12 | DAY | DAY; 39 | ONT; 8 | RCH | CAR; 8 | HCY | BRI | ATL | CLB | GPS | SMR | NWS | MAR | DAR | SBO | TAL | ASH | KPT | CLT | DOV | MCH | RSD | HOU | GPS; 2 | | | | | | | | | | | | | | | | | | | | | | | | | | | | | | | | | | | | | NA | 0 | |
| 1971 | Lund Racing | 55 | Mercury | | | | | | | | | | | | | | | | | | | | | | | | | | | DAY; 33 | BRI | AST | ISP | TRN | NSV | ATL | | | | | | | | | CLT; 38 | DOV | CAR; 12 | | | | TWS; 31 | | | | | | | | | | | | | | | NA | 0 | |
| 1971 | Ronnie Hopkins | 55 | Chevy | | | | | | | | | | | | | | | | | | | | | | | | | | | | | | | | | | BGS; 6 | ONA; 4 | MCH | TAL | CLB; 2 | HCY; 1 | DAR | MAR | | | | MGR; 2 | RCH | NWS; 1 | | | | | | | | | | | | | | | | NA | 0 | |

==== Winston Cup Series ====
NASCAR Winston Cup Series results
| Year | Team | No. | Make | 1 | 2 | 3 | 4 | 5 | 6 | 7 | 8 | 9 | 10 | 11 | 12 | 13 | 14 | 15 | 16 | 17 | 18 | 19 | 20 | 21 | 22 | 23 | 24 | 25 | 26 | 27 | 28 | 29 | 30 | 31 | NWCC | Pts | Ref |
|---|---|---|---|---|---|---|---|---|---|---|---|---|---|---|---|---|---|---|---|---|---|---|---|---|---|---|---|---|---|---|---|---|---|---|---|---|---|
| 1972 | Hank Richardson | 55 | Chevy | RSD | DAY | RCH | ONT | CAR | ATL | BRI | DAR | NWS | MAR | TAL | CLT | DOV | MCH | RSD | TWS; 12 | DAY | BRI | TRN | ATL | TAL | MCH | NSV | DAR | RCH | DOV | MAR; 26 | NWS; 26 | CLT | CAR; 38 | TWS | 104th | 191 | |
| 1973 | Carl Price | 55 | Chevy | RSD | DAY; 36 | RCH; 23 | CAR; 40 | BRI | ATL; 38 | NWS | DAR | MAR | TAL | NSV | CLT; 36 | DOV | TWS | RSD | MCH | DAY | BRI | ATL | TAL | NSV | DAR | RCH | DOV | NWS | MAR | CLT | CAR | | | | 94th | - | |
| 1975 | King Enterprises | 26 | Dodge | RSD | DAY; DNQ | RCH | CAR | BRI | ATL | NWS | DAR | MAR | TAL | NSV | DOV | CLT | RSD | MCH | DAY | NSV | POC | TAL; 46 | MCH | DAR | DOV | NWS | MAR | CLT | RCH | CAR | BRI | ATL | ONT | | 115th | 25 | |

===== Daytona 500 =====
| Year | Team | Manufacturer | Start | Finish |
|---|---|---|---|---|
| 1959 | Buck Baker Racing | Chevrolet | 13 | 40 |
| 1960 | Bill Gazaway | Oldsmobile | 64 | 51 |
| 1963 | Wood Brothers Racing | Ford | 12 | **1** |
| 1964 | Graham Shaw | Ford | 13 | 11 |
| 1965 | Lyle Stelter | Ford | 24 | 29 |
| 1966 | Gary Weaver | Ford | DNQ | |
| 1967 | Petty Enterprises | Plymouth | 11 | 4 |
| 1968 | Bud Moore Engineering | Mercury | 5 | 9 |
| 1970 | McConnell Racing | Dodge | 8 | 13 |
| 1971 | McConnell Racing | Dodge | 23 | 29 |
| 1973 | Carl Price | Chevrolet | 19 | 36 |
| 1975 | King Enterprises | Dodge | DNQ | |

Achievements
| Preceded by Fireball Roberts | Daytona 500 Winner; 1963 | Succeeded by Richard Petty |
