= 1965 Southern 500 =

Auto race held at Darlington Raceway in 1965

Coordinates: 34°17′50.5″N 79°54′18.4″W

Race details
- Race 45 of 55 in the 1965 NASCAR Grand National Series season
- 1965 Southern 500 program cover
- Date: September 6, 1965
- Official name: Southern 500
- Location: Darlington Raceway, Darlington, South Carolina
- Course: Permanent racing facility
- Course length: 1.375 miles (2.212 km)
- Distance: 364 laps, 500.5 mi (805.4 km)
- Weather: Very hot with temperatures of 81 °F (27 °C); wind speeds of 13 miles per hour (21 km/h)
- Average speed: 115.878 miles per hour (186.488 km/h)

Pole position
Driver	Junior Johnson	Junior Johnson & Associates
- Time: 35.993 seconds

Most laps led
Driver	Darel Dieringer	Bud Moore Engineering
- Laps: 199

Winner
No. 11	Ned Jarrett	Bondy Long

Television in the United States
- Network: ABC (tape-delay basis)
- Announcers: Jim McKay

The 1965 Southern 500, the 16th running of the event, was a NASCAR Grand National Series event that was held on September 6, 1965, at Darlington Raceway in Darlington, South Carolina.

The entire racing grid was set by time trials and there was no consolation race to determine the final few spots.

It took four hours and nineteen minutes for the race to be completed with Ned Jarrett beating Buck Baker by fourteen laps and 19 laps over the third and fourth-place finishers: Darel Dieringer and Roy Mayne. This remains a NASCAR record to this day.

== Background ==
Layout of Darlington Raceway, the track where the race was held.

Darlington Raceway, nicknamed by many NASCAR fans and drivers as "The Lady in Black" or "The Track Too Tough to Tame" and advertised as a "NASCAR Tradition", is a race track built for NASCAR racing located near Darlington, South Carolina. It is of a unique, somewhat egg-shaped design, an oval with the ends of very different configurations, a condition which supposedly arose from the proximity of one end of the track to a minnow pond the owner refused to relocate. This situation makes it very challenging for the crews to set up their cars' handling in a way that will be effective at both ends.

The track is a four-turn 1.366 miles (2.198 km) oval. The track's first two turns are banked at twenty-five degrees, while the final two turns are banked two degrees lower at twenty-three degrees. The front stretch (the location of the finish line) and the back stretch is banked at six degrees. Darlington Raceway can seat up to 60,000 people.

Darlington has something of a legendary quality among drivers and older fans; this is probably due to its long track length relative to other NASCAR speedways of its era and hence the first venue where many of them became cognizant of the truly high speeds that stock cars could achieve on a long track. The track allegedly earned the moniker The Lady in Black because the night before the race the track maintenance crew would cover the entire track with fresh asphalt sealant, in the early years of the speedway, thus making the racing surface dark black. Darlington is also known as "The Track Too Tough to Tame" because drivers can run lap after lap without a problem and then bounce off of the wall the following lap. Racers will frequently explain that they have to race the racetrack, not their competition. Drivers hitting the wall are considered to have received their "Darlington Stripe" thanks to the missing paint on the right side of the car.

== Race report ==
In mileage, the gap between Jarrett and Baker was the equivalent of 19.25 miles or 30.98 kilometres. Drivers who failed to qualify for this race were: Pee Wee Ellwanger (Dodge), Wendell Scott (Ford), Worth McMillion (Pontiac) and Bernard Alvarez (Ford). Buddy Baker's vehicle overheated on lap 123 even though he was the favorite to win the race.

Jarrett would go on to claim his second NASCAR championship title after the November 7 race at the Dog Track Speedway in Moyock, North Carolina. While 44 cars would start the race, only 15 would survive until the end. On the third lap Buren Skeen spun out and was fatally injured when Reb Wickersham's Ford plowed into Skeen's drivers door. Darel Dieringer broke with 39 laps to go after leading 199 laps, leaving Ned Jarrett alone by 14 laps en route to the win. Every competitive car had problems with the exception of Jarrett.

Yarborough's car flying over the guardrail after colliding with McQuagg's car (right)

The race saw a scary crash when young Cale Yarborough crashed with Sam McQuagg in Turn One and Cale's car flew over the guardrail and landed outside the speedway; he was uninjured and interviewed for ABC Sports by Chris Economaki.

The polesitter, Junior Johnson, went out after the first lap and finished last.

Curtis Turner would be permitted to race after Bill France dropped his lifetime ban for promoting a trade union with NASCAR. Richard Petty did not race even though he stopped boycotting Chrysler and the Grand National Series.

Other notable names who participated included: LeeRoy Yarbrough, Elmo Langley, and Darel Dieringer. The winner would walk away with $21,060 while last place would receive $7505. Notable crew chiefs for this race were Franklin McMillion, Herb Nab, Jimmy Thomas, John Ervin, Ray Fox, and Bruce Bacon.

The transition to purpose-built racecars began in the early 1960s and occurred gradually over that decade. Changes made to the sport by the late 1960s brought an end to the "strictly stock" vehicles of the 1950s.

=== Qualifying ===
Grid	No.	Driver	Manufacturer	Qualifying time	Speed	Owner
1	26	Junior Johnson	'65 Ford	35.993	137.528	Junior Johnson
2	28	Fred Lorenzen	'65 Ford	36.048	137.318	Holman-Moody
3	21	Marvin Panch	'65 Ford	36.185	136.797	Wood Brothers
4	15	Earl Balmer	'64 Mercury	36.250	136.551	Bud Moore
5	16	Darel Dieringer	'64 Mercury	36.475	135.709	Bud Moore
6	29	Dick Hutcherson	'65 Ford	36.508	135.588	Holman-Moody
7	41	Jim Paschal	'65 Chevrolet	36.738	134.739	Tom Friedkin
8	14	Curtis Turner	'65 Plymouth	36.810	134.474	Sam Fletcher
9	27	Cale Yarborough	'65 Ford	36.060	137.271	Banjo Matthews
10	11	Ned Jarrett	'65 Ford	36.500	135.616	Bondy Long

== Finishing order ==
Section reference:

1. Ned Jarrett†
2. Buck Baker†
3. Darel Dieringer*†
4. Roy Mayne†
5. Buddy Arrington†
6. H. B. Bailey†
7. Stick Elliott†
8. Frank Warren†
9. J. T. Putney†
10. Wendell Scott†
11. Fred Lorenzen*†
12. Jimmy Helms†
13. Bob Derrington†
14. Paul Lewis†
15. Wayne Smith†
16. E. J. Trivette
17. Bobby Johns*†
18. Don Hume†
19. Dick Hutcherson*†
20. G. C. Spencer*†
21. Larry Hess*†
22. Jim Paschal*†
23. Bud Harless*†
24. Gene Black*†
25. Neil Castles*†
26. Elmo Langley*†
27. LeeRoy Yarbrough*†
28. Buddy Baker*†
29. Sam McQuagg*†
30. Cale Yarborough*†
31. Bunkie Blackburn*†
32. Earl Balmer*†
33. Doug Cooper*†
34. Junior Spencer*†
35. Curtis Turner*†
36. Bobby Wawak*†
37. Marvin Panch*†
38. Henley Gray*
39. Tiny Lund*†
40. Bud Moore*†
41. Bert Robbins*†
42. Buren Skeen*†
43. Reb Wickersham*†
44. Junior Johnson*†

† signifies that the driver is known to be deceased
* Driver failed to finish race

== Timeline ==
Section reference:

- Start of race: Fred Lorenzen was the pole position as the drivers are given the green flag.
- Lap 1: Junior Johnson's ignition fails to work.
- Lap 2: Reb Wickersham had a terminal crash along with Buren Skeen.
- Lap 3: Bert Robbins had a terminal crash.
- Lap 9: Bud Moore had to leave the race because his vehicle had terrible oil pressure.
- Lap 25: A frame came loose enough off of Tiny Lund's vehicle that he could not race anymore.
- Lap 29: Problems with the vehicle's clutch sent Henley Gray into the garage.
- Lap 33: Darel Dieringer took over the lead from Fred Lorenzen.
- Lap 42: Marvin Panch fell out with engine failure.
- Lap 46: Earl Balmer took over the lead from Darl Dieringer, Bobby Wawak managed to ruin his engine.
- Lap 47: Bobby Johns took over the lead from Earl Balmer.
- Lap 49: Jim Paschal took over the lead from Bobby Johns.
- Lap 51: A wheel bearing came off Curtis Turner's vehicle, rendering him a noncompetitor for the remainder of the event.
- Lap 54: Darel Dieringer took over the lead from Cale Yarbrough.
- Lap 79: Junior Spencer fell out with engine failure.
- Lap 85: The differential of Doug Cooper's vehicle was acting strangely, knocking him out of the race.
- Lap 87: Earl Balmer took over the lead from Darel Deringer.
- Lap 88: Sam McQuagg took over the lead from Earl Balmer.
- Lap 94: Earl Balmer had a terminal crash.
- Lap 109: Bunkie Blackburn had a terminal crash.
- Lap 118: Sam McQuagg and Cale Yarborough both suffered from terminal crashes.
- Lap 119: Darel Dieringer took over the lead from Sam McQuagg.
- Lap 122: Fred Lorenzen took over the lead from Darel Dieringer.
- Lap 123: Jim Paschal took over the lead from Fred Lorenzen; Buddy Baker's engine blew up.
- Lap 129: Ned Jarrett took over the lead from Jim Paschal.
- Lap 134: The differential on LeeRoy Yarbrough's vehicle developed major issues.
- Lap 145: Fred Lorenzen took over the lead from Ned Jarrett.
- Lap 148: Darel Dieringer took over the lead from Fred Lorenzen.
- Lap 167: Fred Lorenzen took over the lead from Darel Dieringer.
- Lap 168: Darel Dieringer took over the lead from Fred Lorenzen.
- Lap 173: Neil Castles had a terminal crash.
- Lap 222: Bud Harless' engine stopped working properly.
- Lap 228: Fred Lorenzen took over the lead from Darel Dieringer.
- Lap 233: Ned Jarrett took over the lead from Fred Lorenzen.
- Lap 240: Darel Dieringer took over the lead from Ned Jarrett.
- Lap 288: Fred Lorenzen took over the lead from Darel Dieringer.
- Lap 293: Dick Hutcherson's engine stopped working properly.
- Lap 301: The differential on Bobby Johns' vehicle developed major issues.
- Lap 303: Darel Dieringer took over the lead from Fred Lorenzen.
- Lap 319: Fred Lorenzen's engine stopped working properly.
- Lap 326: Ned Jarrett took over the lead from Darel Dieringer.
- Lap 345: The differential on Darel Dieringer's vehicle developed major issues.
- Finish: Ned Jarrett was officially declared the winner of the event.

Preceded by 1965 Myers Brothers 250	NASCAR Grand National Series season 1965	Succeeded by 1965 Buddy Shuman 250

Preceded by 1964	Southern 500 races 1965	Succeeded by 1966
