= Buddy Arrington =

American racing driver (1938–2022)

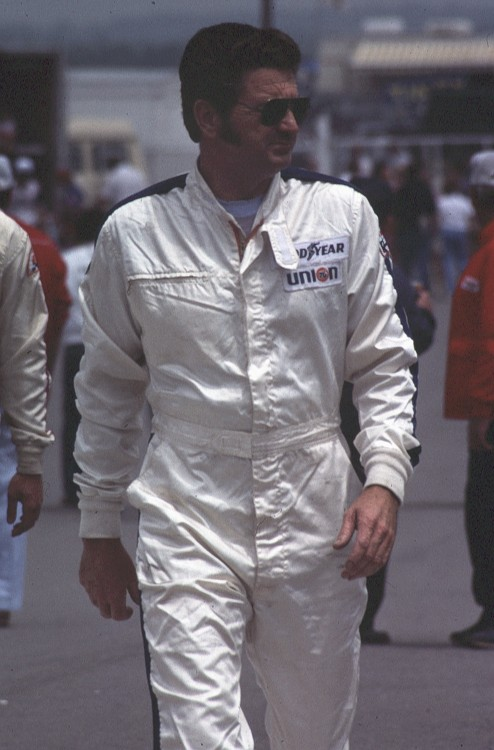
- Born: July 26, 1938; Martinsville, Virginia, U.S.
- Died: August 2, 2022 (aged 84); Martinsville, Virginia, U.S.

NASCAR Cup Series career
- 560 races run over 25 years
- Best finish: 7th (1982)
- First race: 1963 Jacksonville 200 (Jacksonville)
- Last race: 1988 Firecracker 400 (Daytona)
Wins	Top tens	Poles
0	103	0

Buddy Rogers Arrington (July 26, 1938 – August 2, 2022) was an American NASCAR Winston Cup Series driver and owner.

== Racing career ==
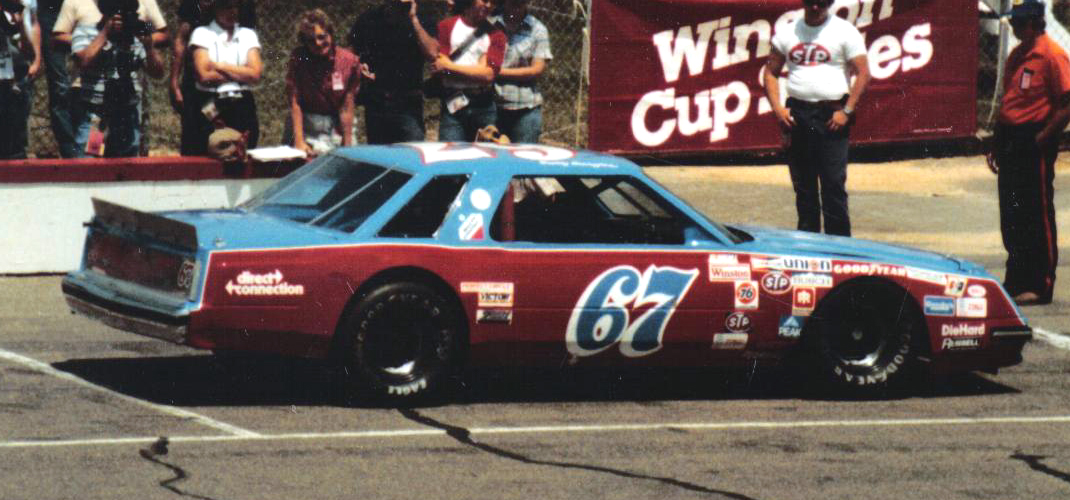
Arrington's 1981 Dodge Mirada

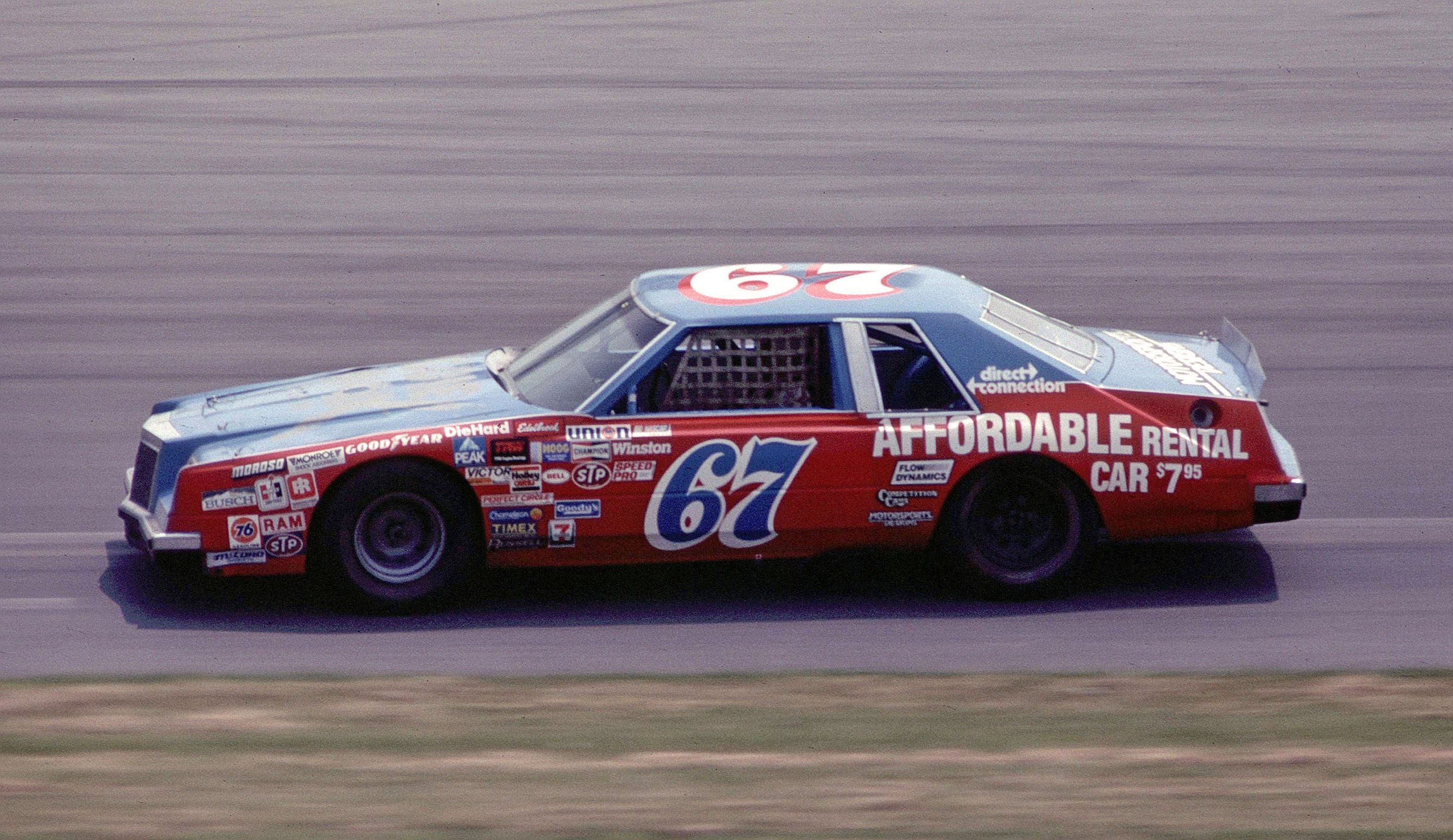
Arrington's 1983 Chrysler Imperial

Arrington has the second-most starts without a win, and finished in the top-ten of NASCAR points twice; in 1978 (ninth) and 1982 (seventh). Arrington was loyal to his Mopar cars and engines, as he ran Chryslers and Dodges until 1985 (Chrysler stopped production of raceable body styles in 1983 and they became ineligible two years later) when the company stopped supporting them. His best career race and finish was at Talladega in 1979, where he had a powerful enough car to lead a few laps towards the end, and finished third. Arrington finished one lap ahead of Richard Petty, driving one of Petty's cast-off Dodge Magnums that were left when Petty abandoned Mopar and began driving General Motors vehicles a year earlier, and several other top NASCAR drivers. Arrington almost always ran his own car, and his operation was a very money-conscious effort. His pit crew were almost always unpaid volunteers, and he relied heavily (and almost exclusively) on used equipment with Petty's old Magnums being his primary cars. Since Arrington could not afford new cars, his team would have to reconfigure the Petty cars and re-skin them into Dodge Miradas or Chrysler Imperials for a 1981 rule change.

Arrington's two Chrysler Imperials were the last Chrysler products to run in the NASCAR Winston Cup series. He ran the car at first in two races in the 1981 season, and in more races (alternating with Dodge Miradas) until April 1985, when at that point the parts supply, even used, for Chrysler products (Chrysler factory support ended in late 1978) dried up. He sold one of the Imperials (purchased from Cecil Gordon in 1984) to Phil Goode in April 1985 (Goode raced it till the end of the 1985 season), and his other Imperial was given to the NASCAR Hall of Fame at Talladega, Alabama. Arrington was always a much-liked man on the NASCAR circuit, and other teams and a small, but loyal fan club pitched in to help keep him racing. In 1985 the generosity of rising NASCAR star driver Bill Elliott (who sold Arrington his slightly used Ford Thunderbird race cars and parts on the cheap) kept Arrington driving until 1988. Arrington's son Joey (who at the age of seventeen served on Buddy's pit crew, and built up his engines), now runs Arrington Manufacturing in Martinsville, Virginia. The company builds racing engines (mostly Dodges) for the Craftsman Truck Series, and test engines for Nextel Cup Nationwide series cars. Arrington was a regular visitor to his son's company, and often offered advice to young (mostly Dodge) drivers trying to make it in NASCAR racing.

Arrington is a noted figure in NASCAR and Mopar history. He began professional NASCAR racing in December 1963 behind the wheel of his Dodge hardtop, and for the next twenty-five years, he never missed a season; finally retiring from the sport in 1988. Arrington drove Dodges from the start of his career through mid-season 1985. In 1984 and 1985, his Chrysler Imperial was the last Chrysler product in NASCAR until Dodge reentered the sport in 2001.

As prolific a racer as Arrington was, and as popular as he still remains among fans, he never won a single NASCAR race. In his 560 career starts, Arrington had fifteen top-five finishes, with his highest points finish of seventh place, achieved in 1982. Mopar stopped sponsoring him and pulled all parts sponsorships in 1985.

Arrington died on August 2, 2022, at the age of 84.

== Motorsports career results ==
=== NASCAR ===
(key) (Bold – Pole position awarded by qualifying time. Italics – Pole position earned by points standings or practice time. * – Most laps led.)

==== Grand National Series ====
NASCAR Grand National Series results
Year	Team	No.	Make	1	2	3	4	5	6	7	8	9	10	11	12	13	14	15	16	17	18	19	20	21	22	23	24	25	26	27	28	29	30	31	32	33	34	35	36	37	38	39	40	41	42	43	44	45	46	47	48	49	50	51	52	53	54	55	56	57	58	59	60	61	62	NGNC	Pts	Ref
1964	Arrington Racing	78	Dodge	CON	AUG	JSP; 8	SVH	RSD	DAY	DAY	DAY		BRI; 25	GPS; 14	BGS	ATL	AWS	HBO; 13	PIF	CLB	NWS; 18	MAR; 27	SVH	DAR; 31	LGY	HCY	SBO; 12	CLT	GPS; 7	ASH; 10	ATL	CON; 15	NSV	CHT	BIR	VAL	PIF; 14	DAY	ODS; 5	OBS	BRR	ISP	GLN	LIN	BRI; 9	NSV; 23	MBS	AWS; 19	DTS	ONA; 10	CLB; 12	BGS; 23	STR	DAR	HCY; 11	RCH; 12	ODS	HBO; 5	MAR; 42	SVH	NWS; 31	CLT	HAR; 9	AUG; 14	JAC; 8	34th	6364	
1964	Arrington Racing	78	Plymouth									RCH; 11																																																						34th	6364	
1965	Arrington Racing	67	Dodge	RSD	DAY	DAY	DAY	PIF	ASW	RCH	HBO; 5	ATL; 38	GPS	NWS; 33	MAR; 5	CLB	BRI; Wth	DAR				CLT; 25	CCF			NSV; 15	BIR; 8							OBS; DNQ	ISP	GLN	BRI; 12	NSV; 3	CCF	AWS; 21			AUG; 11	CLB	DTS	BLV	BGS	DAR; 5					MAR; 12	NWS; 35			CAR; 41									22nd	11744	
1965	Arrington Racing	6	Dodge																LGY; 4	BGS; 16	HCY; 19																																													22nd	11744	
1965	Arrington Racing	62	Dodge																					ASH; 19	HAR; 12				GPS; 5	MBS	VAL	DAY	ODS								SMR; 24	PIF; 7							HCY; 25	LIN; 8	ODS; 13	RCH; 22				HBO; 18		DTS; 24								22nd	11744	
1965	Lester Hunter	35	Dodge																									ATL; 10																																						22nd	11744	
1965	Langley Racing	84	Ford																																																				CLT; 15											22nd	11744	
1966	Arrington Racing	67	Dodge	AUG	RSD	DAY	DAY	DAY	CAR; 25	BRI; 27							MAR; 36	DAR; 27	LGY	MGR	MON	RCH	CLT; 19	DTS	ASH	PIF	SMR	AWS	BLV	GPS	DAY; 36	ODS; 24	BRR	OXF	FON	ISP	BRI			ATL; 6					DAR; 39	HCY	RCH; 23	HBO; 9	MAR; 32	NWS; 15	CLT; 44															32nd	7636	
1966	Joan Petre	73	Ford								ATL; 28	HCY	CLB	GPS; 23	BGS; 22	NWS; 22																																																		32nd	7636	
1966	Fox Racing	3	Dodge																																			SMR; 24	NSV; 15																											32nd	7636	
1966	Arrington Racing	65	Dodge																																						CLB; 24	AWS; 11	BLV; 8	BGS; 22																						32nd	7636	
1966	Paul Lewis	1	Plymouth																																																	CAR; 14														32nd	7636	
1967	Arrington Racing	67	Dodge	AUG	RSD	DAY	DAY	DAY	AWS	BRI	GPS	BGS	ATL; 14	CLB	HCY; 9	NWS; 27	MAR; 9	SVH	RCH; 16	DAR; 28	BLV; 9	LGY; 12	CLT; 17	ASH; 5	MGR; 24	SMR	BIR	CAR; 39	GPS	MGY	DAY	TRN	OXF	FDA	ISP	BRI; 22	SMR	NSV	ATL	BGS	CLB	SVH	DAR; 15	HCY	RCH	BLV	HBO	MAR	NWS; DNQ																	26th	9768	
1967	Arrington Racing	69	Dodge																																															CLT; 9	CAR	AWS														26th	9768	
1968	Arrington Racing	67	Dodge	MGR	MGY	RSD	DAY; 11	BRI	RCH	ATL	HCY	GPS	CLB	NWS	MAR	AUG	AWS	DAR	BLV	LGY	CLT	ASH	MGR	SMR	BIR	CAR	GPS	DAY	ISP	OXF	FDA	TRN	BRI	SMR	NSV	ATL	CLB	BGS	AWS	SBO	LGY	DAR	HCY	RCH	BLV	HBO	MAR	NWS	AUG	CLT	CAR	JFC														NA	0	
1969	Arrington Racing	67	Dodge	MGR	MGY	RSD	DAY; 6	DAY	DAY; 28	CAR; 19	AUG	BRI; 26	ATL; 10	CLB	HCY	GPS	RCH; 23	NWS; 8	MAR; 5	AWS	DAR	BLV; 15	LGY; 9	CLT; 22	MGR	SMR	MCH	KPT	GPS	NCF	DAY; 23	DOV	TPN	TRN	BLV	BRI	NSV	SMR	ATL	MCH	SBO	BGS	AWS	DAR	HCY	RCH	TAL	CLB	MAR; 5	NWS; 27	CLT; 36	SVH	AUG	CAR; 35	JFC	MGR	TWS									33rd	1099	
1970	Arrington Racing	5	Dodge	RSD	DAY	DAY; 25	DAY; 29	RCH	CAR	SVH	ATL	BRI	TAL	NWS	CLB	DAR; 6	BLV	LGY	CLT; 13	SMR	MAR; 19	MCH; 39	RSD	HCY	KPT	GPS	DAY; 14	AST	TPN	TRN	BRI; 29	SMR; 27	NSV; 32	ATL; 18	CLB	ONA	MCH; 32	TAL; 42	BGS	SBO	DAR; 14	HCY	RCH; 26	DOV	NCF	NWS; 28	CLT; 8	MAR; 12	MGR	CAR; 40	LGY															33rd	1087	
1971	Arrington Racing	5	Dodge	RSD	DAY	DAY	DAY	ONT	RCH	CAR	HCY	BRI	ATL	CLB	GPS	SMR	NWS	MAR	DAR	SBO	TAL	ASH	KPT	CLT	DOV	MCH	RSD	HOU	GPS	DAY	BRI	AST	ISP	TRN	NSV	ATL	BGS	ONA	MCH	TAL	CLB	HCY	DAR	MAR; 14	CLT	DOV	CAR	MGR	RCH	NWS	TWS															NA	0	

==== Winston Cup Series ====
NASCAR Winston Cup Series results
Year	Team	No.	Make	1	2	3	4	5	6	7	8	9	10	11	12	13	14	15	16	17	18	19	20	21	22	23	24	25	26	27	28	29	30	31	NWCC	Pts	Ref
1972	Arrington Racing	67	Plymouth	RSD	DAY; 32	RCH	ONT																												22nd	4555.89	
1972	Arrington Racing	67	Dodge					CAR; 8	ATL; 11	BRI; DNQ	DAR; 6	NWS	MAR; 27	TAL; 31	CLT; 7	DOV	MCH; 9	RSD	TWS	DAY; 17	BRI	TRN	ATL; 13	TAL; 5	MCH; 33	NSV	DAR; 6	RCH; 10	DOV; 27	MAR; 7	NWS; 11	CLT; 8	CAR; 10	TWS; 34	22nd	4555.89	
1973	Arrington Racing	67	Dodge	RSD	DAY; 9	RCH; 17				NWS; 25	DAR; 13	MAR; 18		NSV; 14		DOV; 21			MCH; 16		BRI; 30	ATL; 11		NSV; 12	DAR; 14	RCH; 5	DOV; 40	NWS; 25	MAR; 9						12th	5483.9	
1973	Arrington Racing	67	Plymouth				CAR; 12	BRI; 14	ATL; 15				TAL; 49		CLT; 32		TWS; 17	RSD		DAY; 18			TAL; 27							CLT; 7	CAR; 24				12th	5483.9	
1974	Arrington Racing	67	Plymouth	RSD	DAY; DNQ	RCH; 10	CAR; 16	BRI; 21	ATL	DAR; 16	NWS; 27	MAR; 17	TAL; 46	NSV; 10	DOV; 12	CLT; 19	RSD	MCH; 12	DAY; 21	BRI; 8	NSV; 9	ATL; 15	POC; 16	TAL	MCH	DAR	RCH	DOV	NWS	MAR	CLT	CAR	ONT		30th	221.2	
1975	Arrington Racing	67	Dodge	RSD	DAY	RCH; 6	CAR; 9																												18th	2766	
1975	Arrington Racing	67	Plymouth					BRI; 15	ATL	NWS; 20	DAR; 10	MAR; 14	TAL; 38	NSV; 28	DOV; 13	CLT; 26	RSD	MCH; 15	DAY; 21	NSV; 25	POC; 12	TAL; 24	MCH; 22	DAR; 17	DOV; 18	NWS; 18	MAR; 11	CLT; 17	RCH; 12	CAR; 13	BRI; 15	ATL; 20	ONT		18th	2766	
1976	Arrington Racing	67	Dodge	RSD	DAY; 11	CAR; 31			ATL; 30		DAR; 24	MAR; 28	TAL; 22	NSV; 26	DOV; 31	CLT; 14	RSD	MCH; 11	DAY; 40	NSV; 26		TAL; 33	MCH		DAR; 35	RCH; 18	DOV; 10	MAR; 11		CLT; 12	CAR; 16	ATL	ONT; DNQ		20th	2573	
1976	Arrington Racing	67	Plymouth				RCH; 11	BRI; 9		NWS; 18											POC; 7			BRI; 17					NWS; 12						20th	2573	
1977	Arrington Racing	67	Dodge	RSD	DAY; 38	RCH; 24	CAR; 14	ATL; 11	NWS; 10	DAR; 14	BRI; 14	MAR	TAL; 19	NSV; 15	DOV; 11	CLT; 18	RSD; 19	MCH; 19	DAY; 22	NSV; 9	POC; 15	TAL; 12	MCH; 14	BRI; 10	DAR; 14	RCH; 25	DOV; 13	MAR; 7	NWS; 10	CLT; 17	CAR; 12	ATL; 17			11th	3247	
1977	Arrington Racing	67	Ford																														ONT; 19		11th	3247	
1978	Arrington Racing	67	Ford	RSD; 11													RSD; 18																ONT; 35		9th	3626	
1978	Arrington Racing	67	Dodge		DAY; 16	RCH; 15	CAR; 9	ATL; 14	BRI; 8	DAR; 18	NWS; 11	MAR; 5	TAL; 12	DOV; 13	CLT; 15	NSV; 9		MCH; 12	DAY; 34	NSV; 12	POC; 14	TAL; 15	MCH; 12	BRI; 12	DAR; 8	RCH; 16	DOV; 22	MAR; 10	NWS; 13	CLT; 14	CAR; 9	ATL; 16			9th	3626	
1979	Arrington Racing	67	Ford	RSD; 18														RSD; 9																	11th	3589	
1979	Arrington Racing	67	Dodge		DAY; 12	CAR; 19	RCH; 15	ATL; 29	NWS; 25	BRI; 13	DAR; 25	MAR; 22	TAL; 3	NSV; 26	DOV; 10	CLT; 12	TWS; 9		MCH; 15	DAY; 15	NSV; 17	POC; 22	TAL; 8	MCH; 20	BRI; 14	DAR; 14	RCH; 13	DOV; 32	MAR; 7	CLT; 12	NWS; 9	CAR; 17	ATL; 17	ONT; 19	11th	3589	
1980	Arrington Racing	67	Dodge	RSD; 14	DAY; 41	RCH; 6	CAR; 25	ATL; 19	BRI; 21	DAR; 14	NWS; 13	MAR; 10	TAL; 18	NSV; 27	DOV; 26	CLT; 10	TWS; 28	RSD; 14	MCH; 23	DAY; 10	NSV; 10	POC; 13	TAL; 38	MCH; 13	BRI; 20	DAR; 17	RCH; 12	DOV; 13	NWS; 26	MAR; 8	CLT; 13	CAR; 12	ATL; 11	ONT; 10	12th	3461	
1981	Arrington Racing	67	Dodge	RSD; 9	DAY; 26	RCH; 16	CAR; 37	ATL; 14	BRI; 13	NWS; 29	DAR; 13	MAR; 8	TAL; 17		DOV; 7	CLT; 15	TWS; 13	RSD; 26	MCH; 12	DAY; 17	NSV; 28	POC; 16		MCH; 35	BRI; 10	DAR; 37	RCH; 13	DOV; 14	MAR; 11	NWS; 10	CLT; 10	CAR; 14	ATL; 17	RSD; 24	11th	3381	
1981	Arrington Racing	67	Dodge	Negre Racing											NSV; 9																				11th	3381	
1981	Arrington Racing	67	Chrysler																				TAL; 41												11th	3381	
1982	Arrington Racing	67	Dodge	DAY; 15	RCH; 14	BRI; 15	ATL; 14	CAR; 9	DAR; 8	NWS; 16	MAR; 8	TAL; 11	NSV; 14	DOV; 11	CLT; 11	POC; 12	RSD; 15	MCH; 15	DAY; 12	NSV; 22	POC; 9	TAL; 20		BRI; 16	DAR; 9	RCH; 16	DOV; 7	NWS; 21		MAR; 10	CAR; 23				7th	3642	
1982	Arrington Racing	67	Chrysler																				MCH; 6						CLT; 22			ATL; 14	RSD; 35		7th	3642	
1983	Arrington Racing	67	Chrysler	DAY; 16		CAR; 22			NWS; 15		TAL; 23	NSV; 16	DOV; 19	BRI; 16	CLT; 12	RSD; 17		MCH; 29	DAY; 34	NSV; 24				BRI; 13					NWS; 18	CLT; 34		ATL; 14			15th	3158	
1983	Arrington Racing	67	Dodge		RCH; 20		ATL; 16	DAR; 23		MAR; 9							POC; 17				POC; 32	TAL; 18	MCH; 23		DAR; 18	RCH; 14	DOV; 23	MAR; 10			CAR; 12		RSD; 23		15th	3158	
1984	Arrington Racing	67	Chrysler	DAY; 25	RCH	CAR; 15			NWS; 20		MAR; 25	TAL; 24		DOV; 32		RSD; 21	POC; 23	MCH; 18	DAY; 36	NSV; 17	POC; 16	TAL; 21	MCH; 31	BRI; 13	DAR; 28	RCH; 23	DOV; 17								20th	2504	
1984	Arrington Racing	67	Dodge				ATL; 20	BRI; 22		DAR; 11			NSV; 21		CLT; 32													MAR; 18	CLT; DNQ		CAR; 20	ATL; DNQ	RSD; DNQ		20th	2504	
1984	Thomas Racing	67	41	Chevy																											NWS; 29				20th	2504	
1985	Arrington Racing	67	Dodge	DAY	RCH	CAR; 16																													20th	2780	
1985	Arrington Racing	67	Chrysler				ATL; 18	BRI; 25							RSD; 31																				20th	2780	
1985	Arrington Racing	67	Ford						DAR; 17	NWS; 20	MAR; 15	TAL; 14	DOV; 23	CLT; 22		POC; 19	MCH; 23	DAY; 16	POC; 18	TAL; 16	MCH; 10	BRI; 15	DAR; 18	RCH; 22	DOV; 11	MAR; 21	NWS; 23	CLT; 17	CAR; 16	ATL; 20	RSD; 22				20th	2780	
1986	Arrington Racing	65	Ford	DAY; DNQ																															20th	2776	
1986	Arrington Racing	67	Ford	DAY; 23	RCH; 14	CAR; 17	ATL; 20	BRI; 17	DAR; DNQ	NWS; 21	MAR; 15	TAL; 22	DOV; 15	CLT; DNQ	RSD; 19	POC; 21	MCH	DAY; 25	POC; 17	TAL; 21	GLN; 24	MCH; 19	BRI; 16	DAR; 20	RCH; 12	DOV; 15	MAR; 19	NWS; 19	CLT; 22	CAR; 17	ATL; 21	RSD; 18			20th	2776	
1987	Fillip Racing	81	Ford	DAY	CAR	RCH; 17	ATL	DAR	NWS	BRI	MAR; 11	TAL																							25th	1885	
1987	Arrington Racing	67	Ford										CLT; 12	DOV; 18	POC; 25	RSD	MCH; 37	DAY; 28	POC; 17	TAL	GLN; 20	MCH; 23	BRI; 17	DAR; 24	RCH; 14	DOV; 19	MAR; 29	NWS; 27	CLT; 14	CAR; 24	RSD; 21	ATL; 22			25th	1885	
1988	Arrington Racing	67	Ford	DAY; DNQ	RCH; QL^{†}	CAR	ATL; DNQ	DAR; 28	BRI	NWS	MAR	TAL				POC; 21	MCH; 23																		46th	352	
1988	Arrington Racing	67	Chevy										CLT; DNQ	DOV	RSD			DAY; 28	POC	TAL	GLN	MCH	BRI	DAR	RCH	DOV	MAR	CLT	NWS	CAR	PHO	ATL			46th	352	
^{†} – Qualified but replaced by Ken Schrader

===== Daytona 500 =====
Year	Team	Manufacturer	Start	Finish
1968	Arrington Racing	Dodge	22	11
1969	Arrington Racing	Dodge	13	28
1970	Arrington Racing	Dodge	32	29
1972	Arrington Racing	Plymouth	22	32
1973	Arrington Racing	Dodge	36	9
1974	Arrington Racing	Plymouth	DNQ	
1976	Arrington Racing	Dodge	37	11
1977	Arrington Racing	Dodge	38	38
1978	Arrington Racing	Dodge	17	16
1979	Arrington Racing	Dodge	15	12
1980	Arrington Racing	Dodge	31	41
1981	Arrington Racing	Dodge	20	26
1982	Arrington Racing	Dodge	39	15
1983	Arrington Racing	Chrysler	34	16
1984	Arrington Racing	Chrysler	28	25
1986	Arrington Racing	Ford	35	23
1988	Arrington Racing	Ford	DNQ	
