= 1965 Gwyn Staley 400 =

Auto race held at North Wilkesboro Speedway in 1965

Race details
- Race 11 of 55 in the 1965 NASCAR Grand National Series season
- North Wilkesboro Speedway
- Date: April 18, 1965
- Official name: Gwyn Staley 400
- Location: North Wilkesboro Speedway, North Wilkesboro, North Carolina
- Course: Permanent racing facility
- Course length: 0.625 miles (1.005 km)
- Distance: 400 laps, 250 mi (402 km)
- Weather: Very hot with temperatures of 81 °F (27 °C); wind speeds of 18.1 miles per hour (29.1 km/h)
- Average speed: 95.047 miles per hour (152.963 km/h)
- Attendance: 8,000

Pole position
Driver	Junior Johnson	Junior Johnson & Associates

Most laps led
Driver	Junior Johnson	Junior Johnson & Associates
- Laps: 356

Winner
No. 26	Junior Johnson	Junior Johnson & Associates

The 1965 Gwyn Staley 400 was a NASCAR Grand National Series event that was held on April 18, 1965, at North Wilkesboro Speedway in North Wilkesboro, North Carolina.

The transition to purpose-built racecars began in the early 1960s and occurred gradually over that decade. Changes made to the sport by the late 1960s brought an end to the "strictly stock" vehicles of the 1950s.

== Background ==
Through the 1960s and 1970s the NASCAR Grand National Series began focusing on bigger, faster, and longer tracks. Like other short tracks in NASCAR at the time, crowd capacity and purses were small compared to the larger tracks. Over time, Enoch Staley and Jack Combs attempted to keep the facility modern and on pace with the growth of the sport. The West Grandstand was rebuilt with chair-type seats rather than the old bare concrete slabs. New larger restroom facilities were built, and the South Grandstand was expanded. A garage facility was also built within the track, which at the time was rare for short-track venues. But the main focus was on keeping ticket prices affordable. Food and beverage prices were kept low, and event parking and camping were always free. As long as profits covered maintenance costs, Staley was satisfied with the income of the track.

In the Gwyn Staley 160 of 1960, Junior Johnson beat 21 other drivers for the pole position with a lap speed of 83.860 mph. Glen Wood overtook Johnson to lead the first lap, but Johnson had the race under control and led the next 145 laps. Lee Petty moved up from the eighth starting position to challenge Johnson late in the race. With 14 laps remaining, Johnson and Petty made contact. Johnson's car was sent spinning into the guardrail. Petty lead the final 14 laps to win his third straight race at North Wilkesboro. The crowd of 9,200 pelted Petty with bottles, rocks, and debris after his win; he had done their local hero wrong. When Petty took the microphone in Victory Lane to explain his side of the story, the crowd began jeering. Rex White finished second, and Wood placed third. Ned Jarrett finished fourth under the alias John Lentz.

The length of the fall race in 1960 was increased from its usual 160 laps / 100 miles to 320 laps / 200 miles, this it became known as the Wilkes 320. Speeds increased immensely from the previous record, 1.83 seconds quicker than any previous qualifying lap (86.806 to 93.399 mph). Rex White posted the fastest qualifying lap and dethroned Lee Petty from his three-race winning streak at North Wilkesboro. Junior Johnson finished about half a lap behind White in second place.

In the 1961 running of the Gwyn Staley 400, Junior Johnson recorded another pole, this time by 0.57 seconds better than the previous track record, with his qualifying time of 23.52 (95.660 mph). Johnson led all of the 62 laps he ran before transmission problems forced him out of the race. Fred Lorenzen led the next 61 laps until engine problems took him out of the running. And Curtis Turner led 56 laps before experiencing problems as well. 1960 Grand National Champion Rex White, who started on the outside pole, led the remaining 221 laps and won the race. Tommy Irwin started the race in sixth position and finished the Gwyn Staley 400 two laps behind White. Richard Petty followed in third place. Fireball Roberts, in a Pontiac owned by Smokey Yunick, finished fourth (ten laps down), and Johnny Allen, who crashed out of the race on his 387th lap, still finished in fifth place. Only 12 of the 25 cars that entered the race were running at the finish of the first 400-lap edition of the Gwyn Staley race.

In the 1963 Wilkes 400, Fred Lorenzen captured his third straight pole at the track by breaking his own record with a lap time of 23.30 seconds / 96.566 mph. Richard Petty entered the race in an attempt to become the first driver to win four consecutive races at North Wilkesboro. But he experienced engine problems and lasted only 45 laps into the race. Lorenzen led 58 laps, but came up short of victory, six seconds behind winner Marvin Panch. Panch did not start the 1963 season until halfway through because he had nearly lost his life in a crash while testing a Maserati at Daytona that February. Panch, in a Wood Brothers car, started third and led 131 laps in the race. Holman-Moody took the next three spots in the final rundown, with Lorenzen second, Nelson Stacy third, and Fireball Roberts fourth. Stacy started fourth and led 56 laps, while Roberts started from the outside pole and led the most laps with 155.

The track was repaved just prior to the Gwyn Staley 400 in 1964, and the resulting lack of traction wreaked havoc. Fireball Roberts, Buck Baker, Buddy Arrington, and G.C. Spencer all crashed through the wooden guardrail in the first and second turns in Saturday's practice and qualifying. Roberts was unable to start the race because his Ford had been so heavily damaged. Fred Lorenzen won the pole and led 368 laps on the way to the win.

== Race report ==
The race would be finished with a time of two hours and thirty-seven minutes with speeds approaching 95.047 miles per hour (152.963 km/h). Three cautions slowed the race for 7 laps. Junior Johnson would beat Bobby Johns by seven seconds in front of 8,000 loyal spectators. Johns still competed in NASCAR while being conscripted by the United States Army and serving near Columbia, North Carolina.

The pole speed would end up being 101.033 miles per hour (162.597 km/h); this speed would be accomplished by Junior Johnson qualifying in a two-lap solo session. This would be the eleventh race out of 55 races done in the 1965 season. Ford vehicles would sweep the top five finishing spots because 74% of the racing grid were driving Ford Motor Company vehicles.

Individual race earnings for this event ranged from the winner's share of $4,500 ($44,900 when adjusted for inflation) to the last-place finisher's share of $150 ($1,497 when adjusted for inflation). The total prize purse handed out by NASCAR officials was $15,950 ($159,146 when adjusted for inflation).

Notable crew chiefs for this race were Don Snyder, Lanty McClung, Herb Nab, Mario Rossi, and John Ervin.

=== Qualifying ===
Grid	No.	Driver	Manufacturer
1	26	Junior Johnson	'65 Ford
2	28	Fred Lorenzen	'65 Ford
3	21	Marvin Panch	'65 Ford
4	29	Dick Hutcherson	'65 Ford
5	11	Ned Jarrett	'65 Ford
6	7	Bobby Johns	'65 Ford
7	67	Buddy Arrington	'64 Dodge
8	60	Doug Cooper	'64 Ford
9	17	Junior Spencer	'64 Ford
10	23	Buren Skeen	'64 Ford
11	53	J.T. Putney	'63 Ford
12	56	Bill Morton	'63 Ford
13	53	E.J. Trivette	'63 Chevrolet
14	20	Clyde Lynn	'64 Ford
15	31	Cale Yarborough	'63 Ford
16	49	G.C. Spencer	'64 Ford
17	81	Frank Weathers	'63 Dodge
18	74	Donald Tucker	'64 Ford
19	15	Darel Dieringer	'64 Mercury
20	68	Bob Derrington	'63 Ford

== Finishing order ==
Section reference:

1. Junior Johnson (No. 26)
2. Bobby Johns (No. 7)
3. Ned Jarrett (No. 11)
4. Dick Hutcherson† (No. 29)
5. Marvin Panch* (No. 21)
6. Darel Dieringer† (No. 15)
7. Fred Lorenzen (No. 28)
8. G.C. Spencer† (No. 49)
9. Tiny Lund† (No. 10)
10. William Paul Lewis (No. 27)
11. Wendell Scott† (No. 34)
12. Junior Spencer (No. 17)
13. Bub Strickler† (No. 37)
14. E.J. Trivette (No. 52)
15. Jabe Thomas† (No. 25)
16. Gene Black† (No. 75)
17. Bob Derrington (No. 68)
18. Henley Gray (No. 97)
19. Doug Cooper* (No. 60)
20. Buddy Baker*† (No. 88)
21. Clyde Lynn*† (No. 20)
22. Roy Tyner*† (No. 9)
23. Buck Baker*† (No. 87)
24. J.T. Putney*† (#53)
25. G.T. Nolen* (No. 80)
26. Frank Weathers* (No. 81)
27. Cale Yarborough* (No. 31)
28. Bill Morton* (No. 56)
29. Elmo Langley*† (No. 64)
30. Buren Skeen*† (No. 23)
31. Donald Trucker* (No. 74)
32. Doug Yates* (No. 72)
33. Buddy Arrington* (No. 67)
34. Neil Castles* (No. 86)

† signifies that the driver is known to be deceased
* Driver failed to finish race

== Timeline ==
Section reference:

- Start of race: Junior Johnson began the event with the pole position.
- Lap 5: Transmission problems would make Neil Castles into the last-place finisher.
- Lap 19: Engine problems would relegate Buddy Arrington to the sidelines.
- Lap 46: Doug Yates managed to overheat his vehicle.
- Lap 54: Steering wheel problems forced Donald Tucker out of the race.
- Lap 72: Bill Morton had to leave the race due to oil pressure concerns.
- Lap 88: Oil pressure issues managed to take out Cale Yarborough.
- Lap 97: Frank Weathers had oil pressure issues concerning his vehicle.
- Lap 105: G.T. Nolen could not handle his vehicle properly, forcing him to exit the race.
- Lap 118: Differential problems forced J.T. Putney out of the race.
- Lap 131: Crankshaft issues forced Buck Baker to step aside while the others raced on.
- Lap 165: Marvin Panch took over the lead from Junior Johnson; Roy Tyner had to leave the race due to transmission issues.
- Lap 169: Ned Jarrett took over the lead from Marvin Panch.
- Lap 189: Junior Johnson took over the lead from Ned Jarrett.
- Lap 248: Doug Cooper had a terminal crash; forcing him to retire from the race.
- Lap 370: Marvin Panch took over the lead from Junior Johnson.
- Lap 389: Marvin Panch had a terminal crash; forcing him to retire from the race.
- Lap 390: Junior Johnson took over the lead from Marvin Panch.
- Finish: Junior Johnson was officially declared the winner of the event.

Preceded by 1965 Greenville 200	NASCAR Grand National races 1965	Succeeded by 1965 Virginia 500
