= 1963 South Boston 400 (April) =

Auto race held at South Boston Speedway in 1963

Race details
- Race 17 of 55 in the 1963 NASCAR Grand National Series season
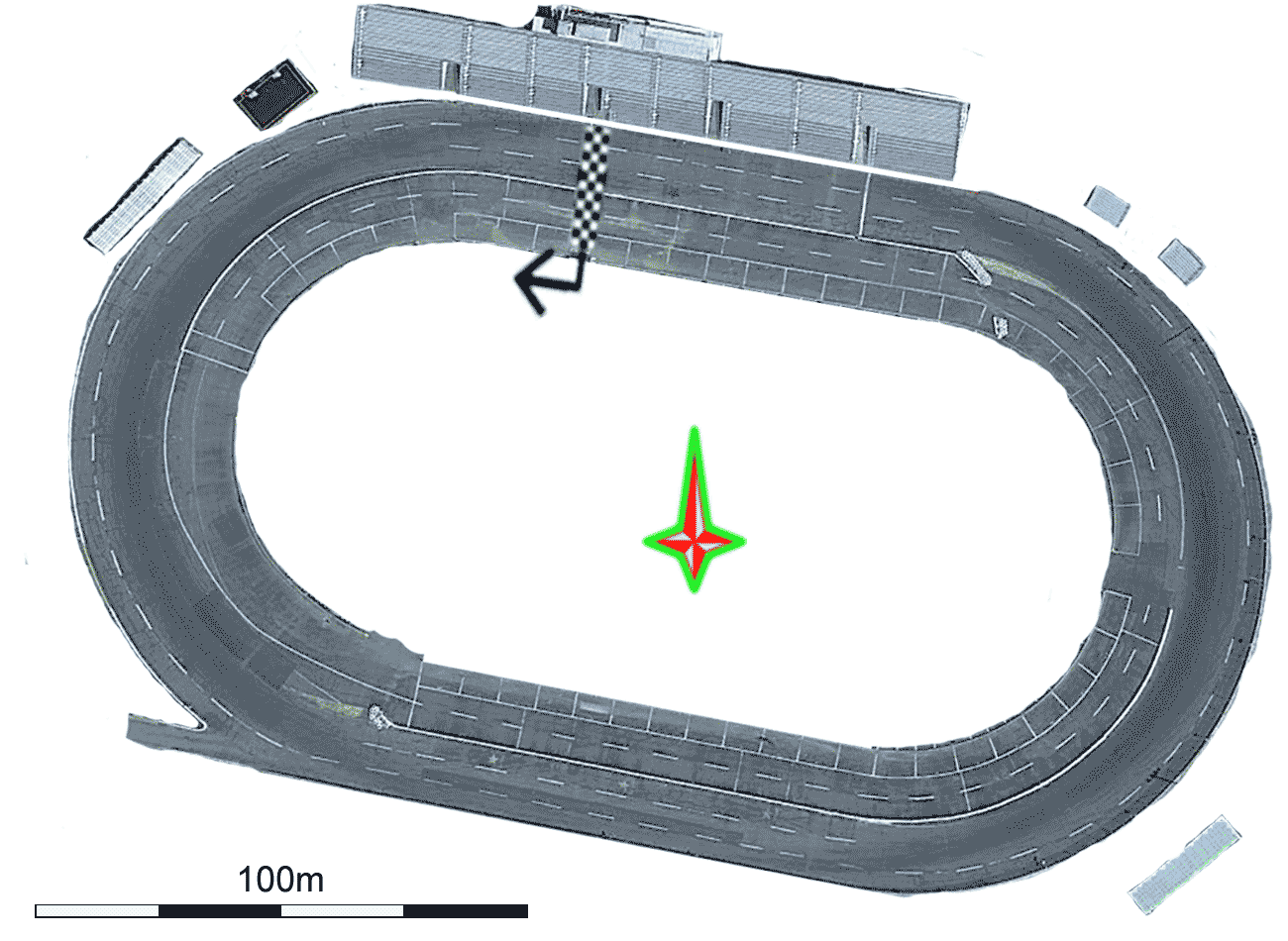
- Date: April 14, 1963; 61 years ago
- Official name: South Boston 400
- Location: South Boston Speedway, South Boston, Virginia
- Course: Permanent racing facility
- Course length: 0.816 km (0.375 miles)
- Distance: 400 laps, 150.0 mi (229.7 km)
- Weather: Cold with temperatures of 60.1 °F (15.6 °C); wind speeds of 12 miles per hour (19 km/h)
- Average speed: 75.229 miles per hour (121.069 km/h)
- Attendance: 5,000

Pole position
Driver	Ned Jarrett	Charles Robinson

Most laps led
Driver	Richard Petty	Petty Enterprises
- Laps: 325

Winner
No. 43	Richard Petty	Petty Enterprises

Television in the United States
- Network: untelevised
- Announcers: none

The 1963 South Boston 400 was a NASCAR Grand National Series event that was held on April 14, 1963, at South Boston Speedway in South Boston, Virginia.

The transition to purpose-built racecars began in the early 1960s and occurred gradually over that decade. Changes made to the sport by the late 1960s brought an end to the "strictly stock" vehicles of the 1950s.

== Race report ==
Ned Jarrett and Richard Petty would be the only lap leaders for this race; with Petty leading the most laps. There were 400 laps in this one-hour-and-fifty-nine-minute race. Last-place finisher Joe Weatherly had to withdraw from the race on lap 48 due to troubles with his vehicle's rear end. Only him, Jimmy Pardue, Neil Castles, Billy Wade and Larry Thomas failed to finish the race out of this grid of 16 American-born drivers.

Jim Paschal was defeated by his Petty Enterprises teammate Richard Petty by two laps in front a live audience of five thousand people. Ned Jarrett qualified for the pole position while driving speeds up to 78.72 miles per hour (126.69 km/h). The average speed of the actual racing event was 75.229 miles per hour (121.069 km/h). Most of the drivers on the starting grid used Chevrolet as their manufacturer while Plymouth and Dodge took up a sizeable amount of the grid; model years for the vehicles varied from 1961 to 1963, as allowances were made for older vehicles before NASCAR become modernized.

Larry Manning scores his first of two career top five finishes.

Winnings for this race varied from $1,500 for the winner ($15,405.98 when considering inflation) and $380 for the last-place driver ($3,902.85 when considering inflation); with the total prize purse consisting of $6,095 ($62,599.62 when considering inflation). Earl Brooks would make first "top five" finish here out of the three that he performed during his professional stock car racing career.

Notable crew chiefs for this race include Crawford Clements, Franklin McMillion, Johnny Divers, and Herman Beam.

=== Qualifying ===
Grid	No.	Driver	Manufacturer	Owner
1	11	Ned Jarrett	'63 Ford	Charles Robinson
2	43	Richard Petty	'63 Plymouth	Petty Enterprises
3	41	Jim Paschal	'62 Plymouth	Petty Enterprises
4	5	Billy Wade	'62 Dodge	Cotton Owens
5	6	David Pearson	'63 Dodge	Cotton Owens
6	87	Buck Baker	'62 Chrysler	Buck Baker
7	19	Herman Beam	'62 Ford	Herman Beam
8	54	Jimmy Pardue	'63 Ford	Pete Stewart
9	09	Larry Manning	'62 Chevrolet	Bob Adams
10	86	Neil Castles	'62 Chrysler	Buck Baker
11	83	Joe Weatherly	'62 Pontiac	Worth McMillion
12	34	Wendell Scott	'62 Chevrolet	Wendell Scott
13	62	Curtis Crider	'62 Mercury	Curtis Crider
14	0	E.J. Trivette	'62 Chevrolet	Bill Church
15	49	Larry Thomas	'63 Dodge	J.C. Parker
16	134	Earl Brooks	'61 Chevrolet	Wendell Scott

== Finishing order ==
Section reference:

1. Richard Petty (No. 43)
2. Jim Paschal (No. 41)
3. Ned Jarrett (No. 11)
4. Larry Manning (No. 09)
5. Earl Brooks (No. 134)
6. Herman Beam (No. 19)
7. Wendell Scott (No. 34)
8. David Pearson (No. 6)
9. Buck Baker (No. 87)
10. E.J. Trivette (No. 0)
11. Curtis Crider (No. 62)
12. Larry Thomas* (No. 49)
13. Billy Wade* (No. 5)
14. Neil Castles* (No. 86)
15. Jimmy Pardue* (No. 54)
16. Joe Weatherly* (No. 83)

* Driver failed to finish race

== Timeline ==
Section reference:

- Start of race: Ned Jarrett started the race with the pole position.
- Lap 48: Joe Weatherly had problems with his vehicle's rear end, forcing him to withdraw from the race.
- Lap 64: Jimmy Pardue's would see his vehicle's rear end become problematic, forcing him to exit from the event.
- Lap 145: Neil Castles would end up having a defective engine, causing him to leave the race prematurely.
- Lap 210: Billy Wade's vehicle would develop engine problems, sparking his early exodus from the event.
- Lap 254: Larry Thomas would have problems with his vehicle's rear end, forcing him to leave the race early.
- Finish: Richard Petty won the race.

Preceded by 1963 Greenville 200	NASCAR Grand National Series Season; 1963	Succeeded by 1963 untitled race at Bowman-Gray Stadium

Preceded by none	South Boston 400 races April 1963	Succeeded by October 1963
