= A. L. Bumgarner =

NASCAR team owner

- Occupation: NASCAR car owner
- Known for: Employing some of the best NASCAR Cup Series drivers in the 1950s

A. L. Bumgarner is a former NASCAR Grand National Series race car owner whose career spanned between 1956 and 1958.

== Career summary ==
Drivers under his employment included Fonty Flock, Junior Johnson, Tiny Lund, Jimmy Massey, and Banjo Matthews. Out of 46 races run by Bumgarner's employees, there were zero wins, two finishes in the top five, and 12 finishes in the top ten. Bumgarner's vehicles started on average in 11th place and finished an average of 19th place while leading 376 laps out of 5649 laps. Due to the low value of the American dollar in the 1950s, Bumgarner only earned a career total of $5,425 in race winnings ($59,124.37 when adjusted for inflation).
