= Ned Jarrett =

American racing driver and television personality (1932–2026)

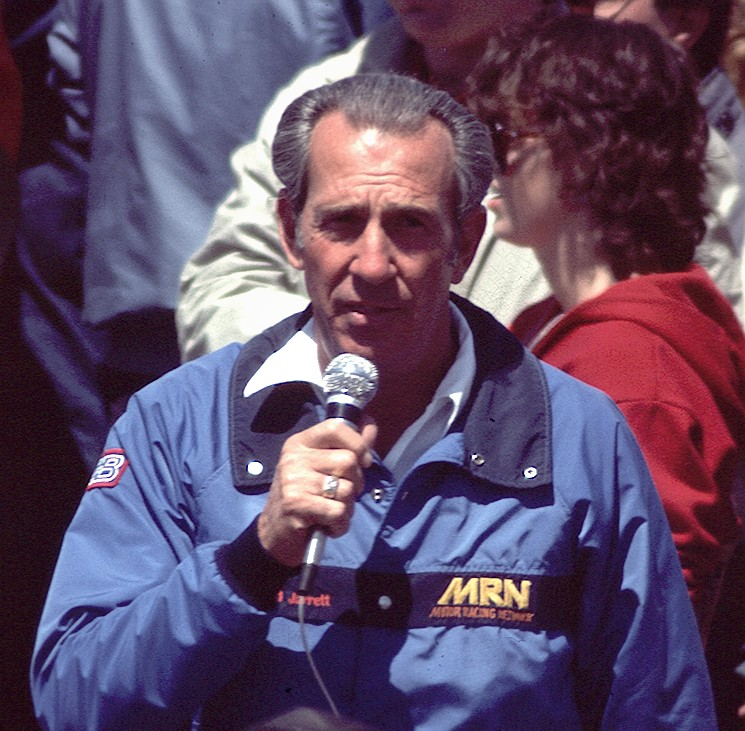
- Jarrett working for MRN Radio in 1985
- Born: October 12, 1932; Conover, North Carolina, U.S.
- Died: June 4, 2026 (aged 93); Newton, North Carolina, U.S.
- Achievements: 1961, 1965 Grand National Series Champion; 1957, 1958 NASCAR National Sportsman Division Champion; 1965 Southern 500 Winner; Led Grand National Series in wins 2 times (1964, 1965)
- Awards: International Motorsports Hall of Fame (1991); NASCAR Hall of Fame (2011)

NASCAR Cup Series career
- 352 races run over 13 years
- Best finish: 1st (1961, 1965)
- First race: 1953 (Hickory)
- Last race: 1966 American 500 (Rockingham)
- First win: 1959 (Myrtle Beach)
- Last win: 1965 Tidewater 300 (Moyock)
Wins	Top tens	Poles
50	239	35
- Statistics up to date as of May 3, 2013.

Ned Miller Jarrett (October 12, 1932 – June 4, 2026) was an American race car driver and broadcaster. He was a two-time NASCAR Grand National Series champion. Because of his calm demeanor, he became known as "Gentleman Ned Jarrett". He was the father of former drivers Glenn Jarrett and Dale Jarrett.

== Racing career ==
Jarrett was introduced to cars early in life: his father let him drive the family car to church on Sunday mornings when he was nine years old. Jarrett started working for his father in the sawmill by the time he was 12, but a racing career was what he truly wanted to pursue.

He drove in his first race in 1952 at Hickory Motor Speedway (North Carolina). He drove a Sportsman Series Ford that he co-owned with his brother-in-law, John Lence and finished tenth. This did not go over well with his father. His father told him he could work on cars but not drive them. Once, John was sick for a race and asked Jarrett to fill in for him. Jarrett used his brother-in-law's name and came in second in that race. That worked out so smoothly that Jarrett drove in a few more races under the assumed name John Lence but was finally caught by his father after winning a race. His father told him if he was going to drive to at least use his own name.

Jarrett raced in his first Grand National Series race in the 1953 Southern 500 at Darlington Speedway. He was out after ten laps after the engine leaked oil.

Jarrett was the 1955 track champion at Hickory Motor Speedway.

Jarrett finished second in the Sportsman Series in 1956, and won the 1957 and 1958 NASCAR Late Model Sportsman National championships (today's O'Reilly Series).

In 1959, Jarrett was looking to pursue a career in the Grand National Series. He purchased a Junior Johnson Ford for $2,000. He did not have enough money to cover the check, so he waited until the bank closed to write the check, entered two races, and won them both to cover the cost of his car.

In 1960, Jarrett won five races, before winning the 1961 Grand National championship with 22 top-five finishes and 34 top-ten finishes out of 46 races, with one win.

One indicator of the personal character of "Gentleman Ned" Jarrett is demonstrated by the decision to sell his 1961 (raced as No. 11) Chevrolet to Wendell Scott (the first NASCAR African American driver) who travelled from his Virginia home to Jarrett's shop on West "A" Street in Newton, NC, to take delivery of the Chevy Bel Air (raced the previous season) when Jarrett changed to Fords in 1962. Scott hauled the old blue coupe away on the back of an open trailer. Bobby Isaac frequented the shop on West A Street during this period when Bud Alman was the crew chief assisted by mechanic "John Carl" Ervin. Ervin later became crew chief to Jarrett and the No. 11 Fords.

Jarrett was once overheard talking with Alman and Ervin about the need to "run all the races" to win the championship. Schedules in those days sometimes included more than one race per week. Among the unique tracks of the early era was Bowman Gray Stadium in Winston-Salem, North Carolina, which was actually the area around the football field inside the Bowman Gray Stadium. The race schedule was difficult. The race teams were smaller, often having only one or two paid members. For example, Jarrett required significant effort in order to prepare for the 1963 Daytona 500 race when the latest "fastback" body was introduced by Ford. Alman and Ervin removed (air-chiseled) most of the body from a 1962 Ford "fatback" dirt car. Next, the two air-chiseled the new body from a 1963 fastback and fitted it onto the old body and chassis. This hybrid body became the car Jarrett drove to third in the "fastback Ford" sweep (top five positions) at Daytona that year.

In 1964, Jarrett joined team owner Bondy Long and with the support of Ford won 15 times (one of which was with Charles Robinson) but lost the championship to Richard Petty. Jarrett picked up his first superspeedway win, at Atlanta Motor Speedway.

In 1965, Jarrett became a star when he won 13 races and another Grand National championship. He placed among the top five in 42 of the 54 races that he ran.

The 1965 Southern 500 at Darlington Raceway was one of the wildest races in NASCAR history. Rookie driver Buren Skeen died after two cars ran into the side of his car in the early laps. Sam McQuagg was leading the race, when Cale Yarborough tried to muscle past McQuagg for the lead. Yarborough flew over the guardrail, rolled around six times, and ended up at the end of the parking lot by a light post. Yarborough waved to the crowd as he walked back to the pits. A video clip of the wreck was used on ABC's Wide World of Sports for several years. With 44 laps left, Fred Lorenzen and Darel Dieringer were fighting for the lead far ahead of Jarrett. Lorenzen's motor expired, and even before he could get into the pits Dieringer's motor started smoking too. Dieringer continued at a slower pace to finish third. The race was won by Jarrett by 14 laps and 2 car lengths or 19.25 miles, which is the farthest margin of victory in NASCAR history (in terms of miles). Jarrett won the season's final race at Dog Track Speedway to clinch the championship; it ended up being his final NASCAR win.

In 1966, Jarrett raced in only 21 of 49 races, achieving eight top ten finishes. When Ford announced that they were withdrawing from NASCAR, Jarrett decided that it was time to retire at the age of 34. Jarrett is the only driver to retire as the NASCAR champion.

Ervin remained as a crew chief to the Jarrett family for years. Ervin later would become crew chief for Dale Jarrett in the No. 32 Busch car owned by DAJ racing.

Jarrett left racing and dealt in real estate and other business ventures before coming back to racing as a broadcaster. He also was the track promoter for Hickory Motor Speedway.

== Racing announcer ==
In the early 1960s, Jarrett began a radio program on WNNC in Newton, North Carolina. His taped show was replayed and locally sponsored, in part by station owner Earl Holder, who gave him both a taping facility and recording studio time for a moderate rate to fill in local programming. It is believed by some that this radio station, WNNC, where Dr. Jerry Punch also began his career on the local high school radio station staff in 1965, was probably the beginning of Jarrett's radio career. Jarrett would sometimes record more than one radio show at a time in order to facilitate the distance required to compete in what was then the "Grand National" circuit of NASCAR.

Jarrett gives much credit to his taking a Dale Carnegie class for his success as a broadcaster and in life.

Later, in 1978, Jarrett became a radio broadcaster for MRN Radio. He interviewed U.S. President Ronald Reagan live at the 1984 Firecracker 400 at Daytona International Speedway, the race famous as Richard Petty's 200th win. Jarrett also hosted a daily radio program about racing on MRN Radio called "Ned Jarrett's World of Racing" until May 15, 2009, when he announced he would retire from the program. Joe Moore became its new host the following Monday, May 18.

Jarrett was a television broadcaster on CBS, first as a pit reporter from 1979 to 1984, and later as color analyst from 1984 to 2000; he was also color analyst on ESPN from 1988 to 2000. He called several of NASCAR's more memorable television moments. He called his son Dale's first victory (in his 129th race) in the 1991 Champion Spark Plug 400 at the Michigan International Speedway. Dale banged Davey Allison's fender at the finish line in what was then the closest finish in NASCAR history. Another famous moment was when he called Dale's victory at the 1993 Daytona 500. At the insistence of CBS Producer Bob Stenner, Jarrett broke impartiality and openly sided with his son on the last lap, coaching him home to victory over Dale Earnhardt. "Its the Dale and Dale show, and you know which Dale I'm pulling for!" Embarrassed by his show of favoritism, he tried to apologize to Earnhardt after the race, but Earnhardt merely smiled and said, "I'm a father, too."

In addition, Jarrett was a host for the original Inside Winston Cup Racing on TNN and NASCAR Tech on FSN.

On May 26, 2007, Jarrett returned to the booth to call the Carquest Auto Parts 300 Busch race alongside Andy Petree, Jerry Punch, and his son, 1999 Cup Champ, Dale Jarrett.

In 2015, as part of Darlington returning to its traditional Labor Day weekend, a throwback weekend was formed. As part of the throwback weekend, Jarrett, along with his son Dale Jarrett and Ken Squier, called part of the 66th annual Southern 500. The team was reunited for part of the broadcast of the Southern 500 race in 2016 and 2017.

== Head of racing family ==
Jarrett was the father of Dale Jarrett, who earned the NASCAR Winston Cup Series championship in 1999 and currently is a race broadcaster for NBC Sports. Ned and Dale became the second father-son combination to win Cup championships (after Lee Petty and Richard Petty). Ned has spotted for Dale in the past. Ned's other son is Glenn Jarrett, who was a sporadic Busch Series driver and had a few Cup Series starts in the 1980s. Glenn now covers UHF television as a race broadcaster. Ned also has a daughter Patti. Patti is married to Jimmy Makar, who worked with Dale Jarrett for three years at Joe Gibbs Racing, and won the 2000 championship as crew chief for Bobby Labonte. Dale's son Jason Jarrett also had a few Busch and Cup starts, with wins in the ARCA Re/Max Series.

== Personal life and death ==
Ned Jarrett was born on October 12, 1932, in Conover, North Carolina, the son of Homer Keith Jarrett (1908–1983) and his wife, Eoline Marie (née Leatherman) (1910–2002).

On January 14, 1950, Jarrett married Olene Rebecca Proctor (1933–2014). Together they had a son, Glenn Ned Jarrett (born August 11, 1950). They divorced; Jarrett remarried on February 18, 1956, to Martha Ruth Bowman (1931–2023). They remained married until her death and had two children, Dale Jarrett (born November 26, 1956) and Patricia Dawn Jarrett (born August 31, 1959).

Jarrett died at his home in Newton, North Carolina, on June 4, 2026, at the age of 93.

== Awards ==
As of 2004, Jarrett had been inducted in 12 motorsports and sports Halls of Fame.

Jarrett was inducted into the Motorsports Hall of Fame of America in 1997.

On October 13, 2010, Jarrett was selected to be inducted into the NASCAR Hall of Fame as one of the five NASCAR Hall of Fame inductees of the 2011 class. He was inducted into the 2011 class of the NASCAR Hall of Fame on May 23, 2011.

=== List of awards ===
Myers Brothers Memorial Award (1964, 1965, 1982, 1983)
National Motorsports Press Association Hall of Fame (1972)
North Carolina Sports Hall of Fame (1990)
International Motorsports Hall of Fame (1991)
Oceanside Rotary Club Stock Car Hall of Fame (1992)
National Auto Racing Hall of Fame (United States) (1992)
American Auto Race Writers & Broadcasters Association Hall of Fame (1992)
Jacksonville, Florida Speedway Hall of Fame (1993)
Motorsports Hall of Fame of America (1997)
Talladega Walk of Fame (1997)
Named one of NASCAR's 50 Greatest Drivers (1998)
Hickory Metro Sports Hall of Fame (2001)
NASCAR Hall of Fame (2011)
Named one of NASCAR's 75 Greatest Drivers (2023)

== Motorsports career results ==
=== NASCAR ===
(key) (Bold – Pole position awarded by qualifying time. Italics – Pole position earned by points standings or practice time. * – Most laps led. ** – All laps led.)

==== Grand National Series ====
NASCAR Grand National Series results
Year	Team	No.	Make	1	2	3	4	5	6	7	8	9	10	11	12	13	14	15	16	17	18	19	20	21	22	23	24	25	26	27	28	29	30	31	32	33	34	35	36	37	38	39	40	41	42	43	44	45	46	47	48	49	50	51	52	53	54	55	56	57	58	59	60	61	62	NGNC	Pts	Ref
1953	Mellie Bernard		Ford	PBS	DAB	HAR	NWS	CLT	RCH	CCS	LAN	CLB	HCY	MAR	PMS	RSP	LOU	FFS	LAN	TCS	WIL	MCF	PIF	MOR	ATL	RVS	LCF	DAV	HBO	AWS	PAS	HCY; 11																																		68th	174	
1953	Ned Jarrett	79	Olds																														DAR; 59	CCS	LAN	BLF	WIL	NWS	MAR	ATL																										68th	174	
1954	Mellie Bernard	17	Studebaker	PBS	DAB	JSP	ATL	OSP	OAK	NWS	HBO	CCS	LAN	WIL	MAR	SHA	RSP	CLT	GAR	CLB	LND	HCY; 18	MCF	WGS	PIF	AWS	SFS	GRS	MOR	OAK	CLT	SAN	COR	DAR	CCS	CLT	LAN	MAS	MAR																											147th	64	
1954	Mellie Bernard	61	Olds																																					NWS; 21																										147th	64	
1955	Mellie Bernard	30	Pontiac	TCS	PBS	JSP	DAB	OSP	CLB	HBO	NWS	MGY	LAN	CLT	HCY	ASF	TUS	MAR	RCH	NCF	FOR	LIN	MCF	FON	AIR	CLT	PIF	CLB	AWS	MOR	ALS	NYF	SAN	CLT	FOR	MAS	RSP	DAR; 37	MGY	LAN	RSP; 33	GPS	MAS	CLB	MAR	LVP																				173rd	-	
1955	Ned Jarrett	89	Buick																																												NWS; 22	HBO																		173rd	-	
1956	Ned Jarrett	89	Buick	HCY; 21	CLT; 12	WSS	PBS	ASF	DAB	PBS	WIL	ATL	NWS	LAN	RCH	CLB	CON	GPS	HCY	HBO	MAR	LIN	CLT	POR	EUR	NYF	MER	MAS	CLT	MCF	POR	AWS	RSP	PIF	CSF	CHI	CCF	MGY	OKL	ROA	OBS	SAN	NOR	PIF	MYB	POR	DAR	CSH	CLT	LAN	POR	CLB	HBO	NWP	CLT	CCF	MAR	HCY	WIL							166th	-	
1957	Ned Jarrett	23	Ford	WSS	CON	TIC	DAB	CON; 19	WIL	HBO	AWS	NWS	LAN	CLT	PIF	GBF	POR	CCF	RCH	MAR	POR	EUR	LIN	LCS	ASP	NWP	CLB	CPS	PIF	JAC	RSP	CLT	MAS	POR	HCY	NOR	LCS	GLN	KPC	LIN	OBS	MYB	DAR	NYF	AWS	CSF	SCF	LAN	CLB	CCF	CLT	MAR	NBR	CON	NWS	GBF										NA	-	
1959	Paul Spaulding	11	Ford	FAY	DAY	DAY	HBO	CON	ATL	WIL	BGS	CLB; 2	NWS	REF																																																				37th	1248	
1959	Ned Jarrett	38	Chevy												HCY; 9	MAR	TRN	CLT; 11	NSV	ASP	PIF	GPS; 22	ATL; 31	CLB	**WIL**; 20	RCH	BGS	AWS	DAY	HEI	CLT																																			37th	1248	
1959	Ned Jarrett	11	Ford																													MBS; 1	CLT; 1	NSV	AWS; 17	BGS	GPS; 3																													37th	1248	
1959	Ned Jarrett	38	Ford																																			**CLB**; 8*	DAR	HCY	RCH; 15	CSF	HBO; 19	MAR; 12	AWS; 8	NWS; 25	CON; 34																			37th	1248	
1960	Ned Jarrett	38	Ford	CLT; 26	CLB; 1	DAY																																																												4th	14660	
1960	Ned Jarrett	11	Ford				DAY; 35	DAY; 6	CLT; 11	NWS; 4	PHO	CLB; 11	MAR; 10	HCY; 2	WIL; 13	BGS; 5	GPS; 1	AWS; 3	DAR; 16	PIF; 1	HBO; 2	**RCH**; 3*	HMS	CLT; 30	BGS; 5	DAY; 7	HEI; 16	MAB; 4	**MBS**; 6	ATL; 15	**BIR**; 1**	NSV; 20	AWS; 13	PIF; 4	CLB; 4	**SBO**; 14	BGS; 10	DAR; 5	HCY; 5	CSF	GSP; 1	HBO; 2	MAR; 28	NWS; 7	CLT; 3	**RCH**; 3	ATL; 43																			4th	14660	
1961	Ned Jarrett	11	Ford	CLT; 16	JSP; 19																																																													1st	27272	
1961	B. G. Holloway	11	Chevy			DAY; 5	DAY	DAY; 7				ATL; 5		**HBO**; 19	BGS; 5	MAR; 5	NWS; 24	**CLB**; 2*	HCY; 19	RCH; 4	MAR; 6	DAR; 10	CLT; 8	CLT	RSD	ASP	CLT; 4	PIF; 5	BIR; 1	**GPS**; 2*	BGS; 6	NOR; 3	HAS; 6	STR; 11	DAY; 12	ATL; 14	CLB; 3	MBS; 3	BRI; 3	NSV; 2	BGS; 3	AWS; 4	RCH; 2	SBO; 3	DAR; 6	HCY; 8*	RCH; 4	CSF	ATL; 7	MAR; 13	NWS; 5	CLT; 18	BRI; 6	GPS; 6	HBO; 3											1st	27272	
1961	B. G. Holloway	11	Ford						**PIF**; 16	AWS; 3	HMS		GPS; 14																																																					1st	27272	
1962	B. G. Holloway	11	Chevy	CON; 5	AWS; 5	DAY	DAY; 16	DAY; 9		AWS; 16	SVH; 13*	HBO; 10	RCH; 2*	CLB; 1	NWS; 24	**GPS**; 1	**MBS**; 3	MAR; 13	BGS; 7	BRI; 4	RCH; 14	HCY; 13	CON; 19	DAR; 9	PIF; 1	CLT; 6	ATL; 39	BGS; 11	AUG; 2	RCH; 6	SBO; 6	DAY; 7	CLB; 5	ASH; 5	GPS; 15	AUG; 15	SVH; 6	**MBS**; 1*	BRI; 9	CHT; 8	NSV; 5	HUN; 4	AWS; 3	STR; 6		PIF; 10	VAL; 1	DAR; 8	HCY; 17	RCH; 6	**DTS**; 1**	AUG; 4*	MAR; 3	NWS; 11	CLT; 11	ATL; 40										3rd	25336	
1962	B. G. Holloway	1	Chevy						CON; 20																																																									3rd	25336	
1962	J.C. Parker	49	Pontiac																																										BGS; 6																					3rd	25336	
1963	B. G. Holloway	11	Chevy	BIR; 11	GGS; 19																																																													4th	27214	
1963	Burton-Robinson	11	Ford			THS; 24	RSD; 6	DAY	DAY; 4	DAY; 3	PIF; 2*		HBO; 4	ATL; 10	HCY; 3	BRI; 15	AUG; 1*	RCH; 2	GPS; 2*	**SBO**; 3	BGS; 5	MAR; 4	NWS; 25	CLB; 3	**THS**; 3*	DAR; 20	ODS; 2	**RCH**; 1*	CLT; 30	BIR; 4	ATL; 10	DAY; 5	MBS; 1*	SVH; 1*	DTS; 2*	BGS; 2	ASH; 1*	OBS; 4	BRR; 8	BRI; 25	**GPS**; 2*	NSV; 7	CLB; 4	**AWS**; 9	PIF; 1	BGS; 5	ONA; 4	DAR; 21	HCY; 14	RCH; 1	MAR; 19	DTS; 1*	NWS; 5	THS; 9	CLT; 32	SBO	HBO; 20	RSD; 34								4th	27214	
1963	Herman Beam	19	Ford									AWS; 5																																																						4th	27214	
1964	Burton-Robinson	11	Ford	CON; 1*	AUG; 5	JSP; 7	**SVH**; 20																																																											2nd	34950	
1964	Bondy Long	11	Ford					RSD; 5	DAY; 8	DAY	DAY; 27	**RCH**; 13*	BRI; 6	GPS; 2*	BGS; 2	ATL; 3	AWS; 16	HBO; 20	PIF; 1	CLB; 1	NWS; 2	MAR; 4	SVH; 12	DAR; 4	LGY; 1*	HCY; 1	SBO; 3	CLT; 33	GPS; 14	ASH; 1*	ATL; 1*	CON; 3	NSV; 17	CHT; 4	BIR; 1**	**VAL**; 19	PIF; 5	DAY; 23	**ODS**; 1*	OBS; 2	BRR; 6	ISP; 2	GLN; 8	LIN; 15	BRI; 25	NSV; 5	MBS; 4	AWS; 1*	**DTS**; 1	ONA; 3	**CLB**; 4	BGS; 3	STR; 2	DAR; 4	HCY	**RCH**; 5	ODS; 1*	HBO; 1	MAR; 5	**SVH**; 1**	NWS; 29	CLT; 4	HAR; 2	**AUG**; 19	JAC; 1*	2nd	34950	
1965	Bondy Long	11	Ford	RSD; 19	DAY; 2	DAY	DAY; 5	PIF; 1	**AWS**; 1*	RCH; 11	HBO; 1	ATL; 3	GPS; 2	NWS; 3	MAR; 10	**CLB**; 2	BRI; 3	DAR; 3	LGY; 1*	BGS; 2	HCY; 2	CLT; 20	CCF; 1	ASH; 2	HAR; 1*		**BIR**; 1**	ATL; 3	**GPS**; 13	MBS; 2	VAL; 13	DAY; 20	**ODS**; 3	OBS; 5	ISP; 3	GLN; 2	BRI; 1	NSV; 2	CCF; 1	AWS; 2	**SMR**; 6	PIF; 1	**AUG**; 3	CLB; 7	DTS; 2	**BLV**; 1**	BGS; 4	DAR; 1	HCY; 3	LIN; 4	**ODS**; 2*	RCH; 19	MAR; 4	NWS; 3	CLT; 4	HBO; 16	CAR; 16	DTS; 1								1st	38824	
1965	Jabe Thomas	25	Ford																							NSV; 2																																								1st	38824	
1966	Bondy Long	11	Ford	AUG; 3	RSD; 8	DAY	DAY; 5	DAY; 7	CAR; 36	BRI; 19	ATL; 18	HCY; 4	CLB	GPS	BGS	NWS	MAR	DAR	LGY	MGR	MON	RCH	CLT; 8	DTS	ASH	PIF	SMR						BRR; 28	OXF; 26	FON; 29	ISP; 3	BRI; 21	SMR; 25	NSV	ATL	CLB	AWS; 15	BLV	BGS	DAR; 13	HCY	RCH	HBO	MAR; 21	NWS	CLT; 37	CAR; 3														13th	17616	
1966	Gray Racing	97	Ford																									AWS; 26	BLV	GPS	DAY	ODS																																		13th	17616	

===== Daytona 500 =====
Year	Team	Manufacturer	Start	Finish
1960	Ned Jarrett	Ford	54	6
1961	B. G. Holloway	Chevrolet	9	7
1962	B. G. Holloway	Chevrolet	38	9
1963	Burton-Robinson	Ford	8	3
1964	Bondy Long	Ford	17	27
1965	Bondy Long	Ford	3	5
1966	Bondy Long	Ford	10	7

Achievements
Preceded by Rex White	NASCAR Grand National Champion; 1961	Succeeded by Joe Weatherly
Preceded by Richard Petty	NASCAR Grand National Champion; 1965	Succeeded by David Pearson
