= Bud Harless =

American racing driver (1924–2007)

- Born: January 24, 1924; Gilbert, West Virginia, US
- Died: October 12, 2007 (aged 83)

NASCAR Cup Series career
- 28 races run over 6 years
- Best finish: 50th - 1963 Grand National season
- First race: 1953 untitled race (Martinsville Speedway)
- Last race: 1965 Southern 500 (Darlington Raceway)
Wins	Top tens	Poles
0	2	0

Bud Harless (January 21, 1924 - October 12, 2007) was a NASCAR Grand National Series driver from Gilbert, West Virginia, United States.

== Career ==
Harless raced for six years and in 28 races (with two finishes in the top ten). His average starting position was 23rd while his average finishing position was 22nd. The number of laps that Harless raced in his career was 4074 - the equivalent of 3,031.9 miles (4,879.4 km). Total prize winnings for Harless were $6,255 ($63,904.04 when adjusted for inflation). Harless was also a NASCAR owner who appeared in thirteen different races as a driver/owner and would be one of the earliest drivers to carry the #8 for his vehicle (which was suspended in 2010 due to lack of sponsorship; the last driver using this number was Aric Almirola) in what is now called the NASCAR Sprint Cup Series.
