= 1966 American 500 =

Auto race run in North Carolina in 1966

Race details
- Race 49 of 49 in the 1966 NASCAR Grand National Series season
- Date: October 30, 1966
- Official name: American 500
- Location: North Carolina Motor Speedway, Rockingham, North Carolina
- Course: Permanent racing facility
- Course length: 1.000 miles (1.609 km)
- Distance: 500 laps, 500 mi (804.672 km)
- Weather: Chilly with temperatures reaching up to 69.3 °F (20.7 °C); wind speeds up to 8 miles per hour (13 km/h)
- Average speed: 104.348 miles per hour (167.932 km/h)
- Attendance: 35,000

Pole position
Driver	Fred Lorenzen	Holman Moody

Most laps led
Driver	Fred Lorenzen	Holman Moody
- Laps: 320

Winner
No. 28	Fred Lorenzen	Holman Moody

Television in the United States
- Network: untelevised
- Announcers: none

The 1966 American 500 was a NASCAR Grand National Series event that was held on October 30, 1966, at North Carolina Motor Speedway in Rockingham, North Carolina.

The transition to purpose-built racecars began in the early 1960s and occurred gradually over that decade. Changes made to the sport by the late 1960s brought an end to the "strictly stock" vehicles of the 1950s.

== Background ==
North Carolina Motor Speedway was opened as a flat, one-mile oval on October 31, 1965. In 1969, the track was extensively reconfigured to a high-banked, D-shaped oval just over one mile in length. In 1997, North Carolina Motor Speedway merged with Penske Motorsports, and was renamed North Carolina Speedway. Shortly thereafter, the infield was reconfigured, and competition on the infield road course, mostly by the SCCA, was discontinued. Currently, the track is home to the Fast Track High Performance Driving School.

== Summary ==
There were 43 American-born drivers on the grid along with Canadian-born driver Don Biederman. Tiny Lund would finish in last place due to a clutch issue on lap 2 out of the 500 laps that were raced that day. The race took nearly five hours to finish with Fred Lorenzen defeating Don White by more than four laps in front of a crowd of 35000 spectators. Lorenzen would clinch the pole position with qualifying speeds reaching 116 miles per hour (187 km/h); with the average speed of the racing only being 11 miles per hour (18 km/h) slower. There were 20 different lead changes and NASCAR had to wave the caution flag four times for a total distance of 35 laps.

The other drivers in the top ten were: Ned Jarrett, Cale Yarborough, Junior Johnson, Buddy Baker, David Pearson, Jim Paschal, Donnie Allison, and James Hylton. Notable crew chiefs who were in attendance for this race were Harry Hyde, Dale Inman, Shorty Johns, and Ray Fox.

While NASCAR promoters kept luring Junior Johnson back to the Grand National Series for the betterment of the fans, he promptly declared his retirement after this race. Ned Jarrett retired because he and Junior Johnson were involved in the crash that killed Fireball Roberts at the 1964 World 600. They both received severe burns pulling Roberts out of the wreckage. The risk was greater than the reward at the time; given the relatively unregulated nature of NASCAR racing during the late 1960s.

Bobby Johns finished in 38th place due to a carburetor problem; a practice discontinued since NASCAR adopted fuel injection in 2012. Tommy Bostick would make his only NASCAR appearance during this race. The winner of the race would receive $14,550 of the total prize purse ($144,380.77 when adjusted for inflation) while the last-place finisher went home with a mere $500 ($4,961.54 when adjusted for inflation).

=== Qualifying ===
Grid	No.	Driver	Manufacturer
1	28	Fred Lorenzen	'66 Ford
2	43	Richard Petty	'66 Plymouth
3	26	Gordon Johncock	'66 Ford
4	29	Dick Hutcherson	'66 Ford
5	14	Jim Paschal	'65 Plymouth
6	99	Paul Goldsmith	'66 Plymouth
7	3	Buddy Baker	'65 Dodge
8	31	Don White	'66 Dodge
9	71	Earl Balmer	'65 Dodge
10	13	Curtis Turner	'66 Chevrolet

Preceded by 1966 National 500	NASCAR Grand National Series Season; 1966-67	Succeeded by 1967 Augusta 300

Preceded by 1965	American 500 races 1966	Succeeded by 1967
