= 1966 Buddy Shuman 250 =

Auto race held at Hickory Motor Speedway in 1966

Race details
- Race 43 of 49 in the 1966 NASCAR Grand National Series season
- Date: September 9, 1966; 58 years ago
- Official name: Buddy Shuman 250
- Location: Hickory Speedway, Hickory, North Carolina
- Course: Permanent racing facility
- Course length: 0.644 km (0.400 miles)
- Distance: 250 laps, 100 mi (150 km)
- Weather: Very hot with temperatures of 82 °F (28 °C); wind speeds of 7 miles per hour (11 km/h)
- Average speed: 76.923 miles per hour (123.796 km/h)
- Attendance: 10,000

Pole position
Driver	Richard Petty	Petty Enterprises

Most laps led
Driver	David Pearson	Cotton Owens
- Laps: 195

Winner
No. 6	David Pearson	Cotton Owens

Television in the United States
- Network: untelevised
- Announcers: none

The 1966 Buddy Shuman 250 was a NASCAR Grand National Series event that was held on September 9, 1966, at Hickory Motor Speedway in Hickory, North Carolina.

The transition to purpose-built racecars began in the early 1960s and occurred gradually over that decade. Changes made to the sport by the late 1960s brought an end to the "strictly stock" vehicles of the 1950s.

== Background ==
Hickory Motor Speedway is a short track located in Hickory, North Carolina. It is one of stock car racing's most storied venues, and is often referred to as the "World's Most Famous Short Track" and the "Birthplace of the NASCAR Stars".

The track first opened in 1951 as a 1/2-mile (0.80 km) dirt track. Gwyn Staley won the first race at the speedway and later became the first track champion. Drivers such as Junior Johnson, Ned Jarrett, and Ralph Earnhardt also became track champions in the 1950s, with Earnhardt winning five of them.

In 1953, NASCAR's Grand National Series visited the track for the first time. Tim Flock won the first race at the speedway, which became a regular part of the Grand National schedule. After winning his track championship in 1952, Junior Johnson became the most successful Grand National driver at Hickory, winning there seven times.

The track has been re-configured three times in its history. The track became a 0.4-mile (644 meters) dirt track in 1955, which was paved for the first time during the 1967 season.

== Race report ==
David Pearson managed to defeat Richard Petty by at least one lap; clinching his first NASCAR championship in the process. This would also be the last race until the 1981 Riverside opener that Richard Petty ran a number other than 43. Richard Petty would race in #41 and #42 for seemingly random events early in his career because various other drivers used the #43 from the beginning of the NASCAR Cup Series right up to the 1960s.

There were 21 competitors in this race; all of them were American-born males. 250 laps were finished on a dirt oval track in one hour and twenty five minutes. Petty would qualify for the pole position with a top speed of 76.923 miles per hour (123.796 km/h) while the average speed of the race would only be 70.533 miles per hour (113.512 km/h). Darel Dieringer would finish in last place due to an overheating engine on lap 3 out of 250. The entire purse of the race would be a paltry $4,640 ($44,968 when adjusted for inflation). Pearson would receive $1,000 of it ($9,691 when adjusted for inflation) while Dieringer would collect a meager $100 ($969 when adjusted for inflation) along with seven other low-ranked finishers.

Other notable names to make their appearance include Junior Johnson, African-American race car driver Wendell Scott, perennial underdog J.D. McDuffie, and future pace car driver Elmo Langley. A crash would take Junior Johnson out of the race on lap 212. Three changes for first place were made along with five caution flags for a distance of 14 laps.

=== Qualifying ===
Grid	No.	Driver	Manufacturer	Owner
1	42	Richard Petty	'66 Plymouth	Petty Enterprises
2	6	David Pearson	'65 Dodge	Cotton Owens
3	1	Paul Lewis	'65 Plymouth	Paul Lewis
4	64	Elmo Langley	'64 Ford	Elmo Langley / Henry Woodfield
5	2	Bobby Allison	'65 Chevrolet	Donald Brackins
6	4	John Sears	'64 Ford	L.G. DeWitt
7	92	Hank Thomas	'64 Ford	W.S. Jenkins
8	26	Junior Johnson	'66 Ford	Junior Johnson
9	48	James Hylton	'65 Dodge	Bud Hartje
10	87	Buck Baker	'66 Oldsmobile	Buck Baker

== Finishing order ==
Section reference:

1. David Pearson
2. Richard Petty
3. Paul Lewis
4. James Hylton
5. Hank Thomas
6. Wendell Scott
7. Bobby Allison
8. Clyde Lynn
9. John Sears
10. Bill Seifert
11. Junior Johnson*
12. Elmo Langley
13. Henley Gray
14. J.T. Putney
15. J.D. McDuffie
16. Paul Dean Holt*
17. Buddy Baker*
18. Buck Baker*
19. Neil Castles*
20. Tom Pistone*
21. Darel Dieringer*

* Driver failed to finish race

== Timeline ==
Section reference:

- Start of race: David Pearson started the race with the pole position.
- Lap 3: Darel Dieringer's vehicle overheated, causing him to exit the race.
- Lap 14: Tom Pistone's vehicle overheated, making him withdraw from the event.
- Lap 16: Junior Johnson takes over the lead from David Pearson.
- Lap 20: Neil Castles's engine became problematic, ending his day on the track prematurely.
- Lap 67: Buddy Baker's vehicle caught on fire, causing him to exit the rave early.
- Lap 71: David Pearson takes over the lead from Junior Johnson.
- Lap 212: Junior Johnson had a terminal crash, forcing him to withdraw from the race.
- Finish: David Pearson was officially declared the winner of the event.

Preceded by 1966 Southern 500	NASCAR Grand National Series season 1966	Succeeded by 1966 Capital City 300
