= Buren Skeen =

American racing driver (1936-1965)

- Born: Whitson Buren Skeen; September 28, 1936; Guilford County, North Carolina, U.S.
- Died: September 13, 1965 (aged 28); Florence, South Carolina, U.S.
- Cause of death: Injuries from racing accident

NASCAR Cup Series career
- 8 races run over 1 year
- Best finish: 60th - 1965 NASCAR Grand National Series season
- First race: 1965 Gwyn Staley 400 (North Wilkesboro)
- Last race: 1965 Southern 500 (Darlington)
Wins	Top tens	Poles
0	3	0

Whitson Buren Skeen (September 28, 1936 – September 13, 1965) was an American NASCAR driver.

== Career ==
Skeen competed in eight Grand National Series events in his career, earning three finishes in the top-ten.

All of those races came in 1965, when Skeen finished 60th in points. His debut went miserably, finishing 30th at North Wilkesboro after transmission woes. But then Skeen improved over the next two races, finishing ninth at Martinsville and then a career-best fifth at Bowman Gray Stadium in Winston-Salem, North Carolina. Skeen would add a seventh-place finish in another race later in the year at Bowman Gray. However, four DNFs in five races were capped when Skeen died from injuries sustained a week earlier after crashing on the second lap of the 1965 Southern 500 at Darlington Raceway. His car spun on the second lap and was hit on the driver's side. Because of the lack of the strength in the roll cage, the drivers side door was completely smashed in. An infamous video shows the car being towed away. The drivers seat was moved completely to the other side of the car, and the steering wheel poking out of the window.
