= Paul Lewis (racing driver) =

American racecar driver (1932–2025)

- Born: September 28, 1932; Johnson City, Tennessee, U.S.
- Died: April 27, 2025 (aged 92)
- Awards: 1960 NASCAR Rookie of the Year Runner-up

NASCAR Cup Series career
- 114 races run over 9 years
- Best finish: 14th (1965)
- First race: 1960 Gwyn Staley 160 (North Wilkesboro)
- Last race: 1968 World 600 (Charlotte)
- First win: 1966 Smoky Mountain 200 (Smoky Mountain)
Wins	Top tens	Poles
1	45	1

Paul Lewis (September 28, 1932 – April 27, 2025) was an American NASCAR Grand National Series race car driver whose career spanned from 1960 to 1968 while primarily driving a No. 2 Dodge vehicle owned by Bobby Allison.

== Career ==
=== Driver ===
Lewis made his debut into top-level professional stock car racing in 1960 at the age of 27. He originally drove a Chevrolet. but also raced Ford, Dodge, and Plymouth cars. During his ten-season career, Lewis made 114 Grand National starts, with one career pole in a May 1965 event at North Carolina's Harris Speedway, and scored his only career win at the 1966 Smoky Mountain 200 in Maryville, Tennessee. He led a total of 71 laps in his career as well.

During his career, Lewis never ran a full season, and his best season points finish was 14th in 1965 after competing in just under half that year's events. He started his career at the age of 27 and ended it at 35 years of age; a latecomer compared to today's NASCAR drivers who generally start their career at the top level between the ages of 18 and 21.

Lewis managed to earn a grand total of $52,867 from all the racing events that he participated in ($489,462.42 when adjusted for inflation). Dirt tracks helped to contribute to Lewis' best career finishes; with him finishing in an average of tenth place. His shortcoming would be restrictor plate tracks; where Lewis would finish a mediocre 30th place on average.

=== Owner ===
Like many NASCAR drivers of his time, Lewis also drove his own car during some of his career; his ownership career spanned from 1962 to 1968. In addition to himself, Buddy Arrington and Tiny Lund also each drove one race apiece for Lewis. Total earnings as a NASCAR owner for Lewis were $29,060 ($269,048.33 when adjusted for inflation).

== Post-NASCAR career ==
Lewis offered advice to stock car racers who live in the vicinity of Johnson City, Tennessee.

== Death ==
Lewis died on April 27, 2025, at the age of 92.
