= E. J. Trivette =

American racecar driver (born 1936)

- Born: June 6, 1936 (age 90); Deep Gap, North Carolina, U.S.

NASCAR Cup Series career
- 178 races run over 13 years
- Best finish: 11th (1969)
- First race: 1959 untitled race (Orange Speedway)
- Last race: 1971 Maryville 200 (Smoky Mountain Raceway)
Wins	Top tens	Poles
0	29	0

E. J. Trivette (born June 6, 1936) is an American retired NASCAR Winston Cup Series driver.

== Career ==
In his 13 year career, Trivette has raced 177 races and has accomplished twenty-nine finishes in the top ten. He has also managed to race 31,181 laps – the equivalent to 23,731.6 miles (38,192.3 km). Trivette's average finish for his career was in 19th place while his average start for his career is 23rd place. Total earnings for this driver are $31,181 ($247,885.11 when adjusted for inflation). Richmond International Raceway was Trivette's favorite course; with him finishing in 11th place on average. Most of his rocky finishes would come at Talladega Superspeedway where a 35th-place finish was routine.

Gary Baird was Trivette's sponsor for most of his career. Chevrolet and Ford would be the primary manufacturers that would provide vehicles for this driver during his career. Trivette would also try his hand at owning a NASCAR ride; he would end up competing in seven different races for himself.

=== Post-NASCAR career ===
Trivette's son Barry would eventually become the vice president and chassis designer for Baird & Trivette Racing (a company that E.J. Trivette would form with Gary Baird in 1982). Trivette now resides in the Ft. Myers, Florida area where his race car chassis manufacturing plant is located.

The business produces mainly for Late Model drivers and for GT (grand tourer) drivers.
