= H. B. Bailey =

American race car driver (1936–2003)

- Born: November 15, 1936; Houston, Texas, U.S.
- Died: April 17, 2003 (aged 66)

NASCAR Cup Series career
- 85 races run over 27 years
- Best finish: 29th (1965)
- First race: 1962 Dixie 400 (Atlanta)
- Last race: 1993 Mountain Dew Southern 500 (Darlington)
Wins	Top tens	Poles
0	5	0

Herring Burl "H. B." Bailey (November 15, 1936 – April 17, 2003) was a NASCAR driver. He raced his No. 36 Pontiac part-time as an independent driver in the Grand National/Winston Cup series from 1962 to 1993, making 85 races over his career.

Although he never ran a full schedule, Bailey still had his share of fans. He had the distinction of being the first driver to take a qualifying lap for the inaugural Brickyard 400 in 1994.

Bailey said he began racing at Playland Park, near Houston, in 1954. He won the track championship there in 1959.

Bailey competed in the 1988 NASCAR Christmas 500 at the Calder Park Thunderdome in Australia, finishing 27th following an accident after 128 laps.

Darlington Raceway was one of Bailey's favorite venues, and he was a three-time member of the UNOCAL/Darlington Record Club at the famed South Carolina oval. Bailey made his final start in the 1993 Southern 500 at Darlington.

In the 1972 NASCAR Grand American division, Bailey won the pole for the opener at Daytona International Speedway, won at Nashville and finished second in the national championship standings to Wayne Andrews.

Bailey died of heart failure on April 17, 2003. When he died, Richard Petty, who raced alongside Bailey for virtually his entire career, said "Our sport was built by people like H.B. Bailey", adding "H.B. was a racer through and through, and the sport is better off because he was a part of it. We will miss him."

Bailey's son and mechanic on his cars, Joe Dan, later worked as an engineer for various NASCAR teams, including Bob Whitcomb's 1990 Daytona 500-winning team and the Richard Childress Racing 1993 and 1994 NASCAR Cup Series championship teams.

== Motorsports career results ==
=== NASCAR ===
(key) (Bold – Pole position awarded by qualifying time. Italics – Pole position earned by points standings or practice time. * – Most laps led.)

==== Grand National Series ====
NASCAR Grand National Series results
Year	Team	No.	Make	1	2	3	4	5	6	7	8	9	10	11	12	13	14	15	16	17	18	19	20	21	22	23	24	25	26	27	28	29	30	31	32	33	34	35	36	37	38	39	40	41	42	43	44	45	46	47	48	49	50	51	52	53	54	55	56	57	58	59	60	61	62	NGNC	Pts	Ref
1962	Bailey Racing	24	Pontiac	CON	AWS	DAY	DAY	DAY	CON	AWS	SVH	HBO	RCH	CLB	NWS	GPS	MBS	MAR	BGS	BRI	RCH	HCY	CON	DAR	PIF	CLT	ATL	BGS	AUG	RCH	SBO	DAY	CLB	ASH	GPS	AUG	SVH	MBS	BRI	CHT	NSV	HUN	AWS	STR	BGS	PIF	VAL	DAR	HCY	RCH	DTS	AUG	MAR	NWS	CLT	ATL; 30										128th	80	
1963	Bailey Racing	04	Pontiac	BIR	GGS	THS	RSD	DAY	DAY; 17	DAY; 19	PIF	AWS	HBO	ATL	HCY	BRI	AUG	RCH	GPS	SBO	BGS	MAR	NWS	CLB	THS	DAR	ODS	RCH	CLT	BIR	ATL	DAY	MBS	SVH	DTS	BGS	ASH	OBS	BRR	BRI	GPS	NSV	CLB	AWS	PIF	BGS	ONA	DAR	HCY	RCH	MAR	DTS	NWS	THS	CLT	SBO	HBO	RSD								53rd	2046	
1964	Bailey Racing	04	Pontiac	CON	AUG	JSP	SVH	RSD	DAY	DAY	DAY	RCH	BRI	GPS	BGS	ATL	AWS	HBO	PIF	CLB	NWS	MAR	SVH	DAR	LGY	HCY	SBO	CLT	GPS	ASH	ATL	CON	NSV	CHT	BIR	VAL	PIF	DAY	ODS	OBS	BRR	ISP	GLN	LIN	BRI	NSV	MBS	AWS	DTS	ONA	CLB	BGS	STR	DAR; 26	HCY	RCH	ODS	HBO	MAR	SVH	NWS	CLT; DNQ	HAR	AUG	JAC	136th	88	
1964	Herman Beam	19	Ford																																																											CLT; 38				136th	88	
1965	Bailey Racing	04	Pontiac	RSD	DAY; 5	DAY	DAY; 12	PIF	ASW	RCH	HBO	ATL; 32	GPS	NWS	MAR	CLB	BRI	DAR	LGY	BGS	HCY	CLT	CCF	ASH	HAR	NSV	BIR	ATL	GPS	MBS	VAL	DAY	ODS	OBS	ISP	GLN	BRI	NSV	CCF	AWS	SMR	PIF	AUG	CLB	DTS	BLV	BGS	DAR; 6	HCY	LIN	ODS	RCH	MAR	NWS	CLT; 8	HBO	CAR	DTS								29th	7340	
1966	Bailey Racing	36	Pontiac	AUG	RSD	DAY	DAY; 12	DAY; 49	CAR	BRI	ATL	HCY	CLB	GPS	BGS	NWS	MAR	DAR	LGY	MGR	MON	RCH	CLT; 34	DTS	ASH	PIF	SMR	AWS	BLV	GPS	DAY	ODS	BRR	OXF	FON	ISP	BRI	SMR	NSV	ATL	CLB	AWS	BLV	BGS	DAR; 17	HCY	RCH	HBO	MAR	NWS	CLT	CAR														65th	1892	
1967	Bailey Racing	36	Pontiac	AUG	RSD	DAY	DAY; 15	DAY; 18	AWS	BRI	GPS	BGS	ATL	CLB	HCY	NWS	MAR	SVH	RCH	DAR	BLV	LGY	CLT	ASH	MGR	SMR	BIR	CAR	GPS	MGY	DAY	TRN	OXF	FDA	ISP	BRI	SMR	NSV	ATL	BGS	CLB	SVH	DAR; 31	HCY	RCH	BLV	HBO	MAR	NWS	CLT	CAR	AWS														50th	3482	
1968	Bailey Racing	36	Pontiac	MGR	MGY	RSD	DAY; 49	BRI	RCH	ATL	HCY	GPS	CLB	NWS	MAR	AUG	AWS	DAR	BLV	LGY	CLT	ASH	MGR	SMR	BIR	CAR	GPS	DAY	ISP	OXF	FDA	TRN	BRI	SMR	NSV	ATL	CLB	BGS	AWS	SBO	LGY	DAR; 23	HCY	RCH	BLV	HBO	MAR	NWS	AUG	CLT	CAR	JFC														81st	-	
1969	Bailey Racing	36	Pontiac	MGR	MGY	RSD	DAY; 12	DAY	DAY; 47	CAR	AUG	BRI	ATL	CLB	HCY	GPS	RCH	NWS	MAR	AWS	DAR	BLV	LGY	CLT	MGR	SMR	MCH	KPT	GPS	NCF	DAY; 10	DOV	TPN	TRN	BLV	BRI	NSV	SMR	ATL	MCH; 37	SBO	BGS	AWS	DAR; 30	HCY	RCH	TAL	CLB	MAR	NWS	CLT	SVH	AUG	CAR	JFC	MGR	TWS; 20									53rd	372	
1970	Bailey Racing	38	Pontiac	RSD	DAY	DAY	DAY	RCH	CAR	SVH	ATL	BRI	TAL	NWS	CLB	DAR	BLV	LGY	CLT	SMR	MAR	MCH	RSD	HCY	KPT	GPS	DAY	AST	TPN	TRN	BRI	SMR	NSV	ATL	CLB	ONA	MCH	TAL	BGS	SBO	DAR; 34	HCY	RCH	DOV	NCF	NWS	CLT	MAR	MGR	CAR	LGY															NA	0	
1971	Bailey Racing	36	Pontiac	RSD	DAY	DAY	DAY	ONT	RCH	CAR	HCY	BRI	ATL	CLB	GPS	SMR	NWS	MAR	DAR	SBO	TAL	ASH	KPT	CLT	DOV	MCH	RSD	HOU	GPS	DAY	BRI	AST	ISP	TRN	NSV	ATL	BGS	ONA	MCH	TAL	CLB; 24	HCY; 14	DAR	MAR	CLT	DOV	CAR	MGR; 22	RCH	NWS																NA	0	
1971	J.C. Crews	53	Ford																																																TWS; 33															NA	0	

==== Winston Cup Series ====
NASCAR Winston Cup Series results
Year	Team	No.	Make	1	2	3	4	5	6	7	8	9	10	11	12	13	14	15	16	17	18	19	20	21	22	23	24	25	26	27	28	29	30	31	32	NWCC	Pts	Ref
1972	J.C. Crews	53	Ford	RSD	DAY	RCH	ONT	CAR; 21	ATL	BRI	DAR; 32	NWS	MAR	TAL	CLT	DOV	MCH	RSD																		58th	792.2	
1972	Blank & Kalashian	66	Pontiac																TWS; 11	DAY	BRI	TRN	ATL	TAL	MCH	NSV	DAR; 5	RCH	DOV	MAR	NWS	CLT	CAR	TWS; 36		58th	792.2	
1973	Bailey Racing	36	Pontiac	RSD	DAY; DNQ	RCH	CAR	BRI	ATL	NWS	DAR	MAR	TAL	NSV	CLT	DOV	TWS; 11	RSD	MCH	DAY	BRI	ATL; 39	TAL	NSV	DAR	RCH	DOV	NWS	MAR	CLT	CAR					77th	-	
1975	Bailey Racing	36	Pontiac	RSD	DAY; DNQ	RCH	CAR	BRI	ATL	NWS	DAR	MAR	TAL	NSV	DOV	CLT	RSD	MCH	DAY	NSV	POC	TAL	MCH	DAR; 40	DOV	NWS	MAR	CLT	RCH	CAR	BRI	ATL	ONT			113th	43	
1979	Bailey Racing	36	Pontiac	RSD	DAY	CAR	RCH	ATL	NWS	BRI	DAR	MAR	TAL	NSV	DOV	CLT	TWS; 16	RSD	MCH	DAY	NSV	POC	TAL	MCH; 35	BRI	DAR; 27	RCH	DOV	MAR	CLT	NWS	CAR	ATL; 20	ONT		56th	255	
1981	Bailey Racing	36	Pontiac	RSD	DAY; DNQ	RCH	CAR	ATL	BRI	NWS	DAR	MAR	TAL	NSV	DOV	CLT	TWS; 15	RSD	MCH	DAY	NSV	POC	TAL	MCH	BRI	DAR; 36	RCH	DOV	MAR	NWS	CLT; 16	CAR	ATL; 40	RSD		55th	-	
1982	Bailey Racing	36	Pontiac	DAY	RCH	BRI	ATL	CAR	DAR; 35	NWS	MAR	TAL	NSV	DOV	CLT; 26	POC	RSD	MCH; 21	DAY	NSV	POC	TAL	MCH; 35	BRI	DAR; 29	RCH	DOV	NWS	CLT; 26	MAR	CAR	ATL	RSD			41st	462	
1983	Bailey Racing	36	Pontiac	DAY	RCH	CAR	ATL; 22	DAR	NWS	MAR	TAL	NSV	DOV	BRI	CLT; 22	RSD	POC	MCH; DNQ	DAY	NSV	POC	TAL	MCH; DNQ	BRI	DAR	RCH	DOV	MAR	NWS	CLT	CAR	ATL	RSD			61st	194	
1984	Bailey Racing	36	Pontiac	DAY	RCH	CAR	ATL; 22	BRI	NWS	DAR	MAR	TAL	NSV	DOV	CLT	RSD	POC	MCH; DNQ	DAY	NSV	POC	TAL	MCH; DNQ	BRI	DAR; 25	RCH	DOV	MAR	CLT	NWS	CAR	ATL	RSD			58th	185	
1985	Bailey Racing	36	Pontiac	DAY	RCH	CAR	ATL; 35	BRI	DAR	NWS	MAR	TAL	DOV	CLT; DNQ	RSD	POC	MCH	DAY	POC	TAL	MCH	BRI	DAR; 34	RCH	DOV	MAR	NWS	CLT	CAR	ATL	RSD					74th	119	
1986	Bailey Racing	36	Pontiac	DAY	RCH	CAR	ATL; 37	BRI	DAR; 12	NWS	MAR	TAL	DOV	CLT; DNQ	RSD	POC	MCH	DAY	POC	TAL	GLN	MCH	BRI	DAR; 17	RCH	DOV	MAR	NWS	CLT; DNQ	CAR	ATL; 41	RSD				52nd	336	
1987	Bailey Racing	36	Pontiac	DAY	CAR	RCH	ATL; 18	DAR; 17	NWS	BRI	MAR	TAL	CLT	DOV	POC	RSD	MCH; 40	DAY	POC	TAL	GLN	MCH; DNQ	BRI	DAR; 35	RCH	DOV	MAR	NWS	CLT; DNQ	CAR	RSD	ATL; 19				49th	428	
1988	Bailey Racing	36	Pontiac	DAY	RCH	CAR	ATL; 41	DAR; 16	BRI	NWS	MAR	TAL	CLT; 35	DOV	RSD	POC	MCH; 39	DAY	POC	TAL	GLN	MCH; 28	BRI	DAR; 27	RCH	DOV	MAR	CLT; DNQ	NWS	CAR	PHO	ATL; 35				43rd	478	
1989	Bailey Racing	36	Pontiac	DAY	CAR	ATL; DNQ	RCH	DAR	BRI	NWS	MAR	TAL	CLT; DNQ	DOV	SON	POC	MCH; 26	DAY	POC	TAL	GLN	MCH	BRI	DAR; 27	RCH	DOV	MAR	CLT; DNQ	NWS	CAR	PHO	ATL				60th	167	
1990	Bailey Racing	36	Pontiac	DAY	RCH	CAR	ATL; 32	DAR; 33	BRI	NWS	MAR	TAL	CLT; DNQ	DOV	SON	POC	MCH	DAY	POC	TAL	GLN	MCH; DNQ	BRI	DAR; 38	RCH	DOV	MAR	NWS	CLT; DNQ	CAR	PHO	ATL				65th	180	
1991	Bailey Racing	36	Pontiac	DAY	RCH	CAR	ATL; DNQ	DAR; 35	BRI	NWS	MAR	TAL	CLT	DOV	SON	POC	MCH; 33	DAY	POC	TAL	GLN	MCH; 28	BRI	DAR; DNQ	RCH	DOV	MAR	NWS	CLT	CAR	PHO	ATL; DNQ				53rd	201	
1992	Bailey Racing	36	Pontiac	DAY	CAR	RCH	ATL	DAR	BRI	NWS	MAR	TAL	CLT	DOV	SON	POC	MCH; 41	DAY	POC	TAL	GLN	MCH; DNQ	BRI	DAR	RCH	DOV	MAR	NWS	CLT	CAR	PHO	ATL				95th	40	
1993	Bailey Racing	36	Pontiac	DAY	CAR	RCH	ATL	DAR	BRI	NWS	MAR	TAL	SON	CLT	DOV	POC	MCH; 32	DAY	NHA	POC	TAL	GLN	MCH	BRI	DAR; 37	RCH	DOV	MAR	NWS	CLT; DNQ	CAR	PHO	ATL			60th	119	
1994	Bailey Racing	36	Pontiac	DAY	CAR	RCH	ATL	DAR; DNQ	BRI	NWS	MAR	TAL	SON	CLT	DOV	POC	MCH; DNQ	DAY	NHA	POC	TAL	IND; DNQ	GLN	MCH	BRI	DAR	RCH	DOV	MAR	NWS	CLT	CAR	PHO	ATL		NA	-	
1997	Bailey Racing	66	Pontiac	DAY	CAR	RCH	ATL	DAR	TEX; DNQ	BRI	MAR	SON	TAL	CLT	DOV	POC	MCH	CAL	DAY	NHA	POC	IND	GLN	MCH	BRI	DAR	RCH	NHA	DOV	MAR	CLT	TAL	CAR	PHO	ATL	NA	-	

===== Daytona 500 =====
Year	Team	Manufacturer	Start	Finish
1963	Bailey Racing	Pontiac	49	19
1965	Bailey Racing	Pontiac	9	12
1966	Bailey Racing	Pontiac	24	49
1967	Bailey Racing	Pontiac	30	18
1968	Bailey Racing	Pontiac	18	49
1969	Bailey Racing	Pontiac	25	47
1973	Bailey Racing	Pontiac	DNQ	
1975	Bailey Racing	Pontiac	DNQ	
1981	Bailey Racing	Pontiac	DNQ	

==== Winston West Series ====
NASCAR Winston West Series results
Year	Team	No.	Make	1	2	3	4	5	6	7	8	9	10	11	12	13	14	Pos.	Pts	Ref
1997	Bailey Racing	36	Pontiac	TUS	AMP	SON	TUS	MMR	LVS; 15	CAL	EVG	POR	PPR; 17	AMP	SON	MMR	LVS; 26	38th	315	

=== ARCA Bondo/Mar-Hyde Series ===
(key) (Bold – Pole position awarded by qualifying time. Italics – Pole position earned by points standings or practice time. * – Most laps led.)

ARCA Bondo/Mar-Hyde Series results
Year	Team	No.	Make	1	2	3	4	5	6	7	8	9	10	11	12	13	14	15	16	17	18	19	20	21	22	23	24	25	26	27	28	29	30	31	32	33	34	35	ABSC	Pts	Ref
1964	Bailey Racing	36	Pontiac	ONA	DAY	DAY; 5	DAY; 7	PAS	CCS; 7	HOU	ONA	FMS	TOL	DSP	NSV	CSP	CAN	HEI	HAG	SLM	MSF	CSP	DSP	ONA	MIR	BFS	SND	LSP	DSP	FMS	SLM	CMS	WIN	BLN	MSF	DSP	CCF	SLM	NA	0	
1973	Bailey Racing	36	Pontiac	TWS; 2	SLM	DAY	FMS	SLM	TOL	QCS	SEL	LIN	CAR	LFS	MAD	TOL	MCS	BFS	NSV	QCS	TOL	SLM	HEI	SHA	FRS	FMS	BLN	MCS	LCS	TMS	NBS								NA	0	
1988	Bailey Racing	36	Pontiac	DAY	ATL	TAL	FRS	PCS	ROC	POC	WIN	KIL	ACS	SLM	POC	TAL	DEL	FRS	ISF	DSF	SLM	ATL; 22																	88th	-	
1989	Bailey Racing	36	Pontiac	DAY	ATL	KIL	TAL	FRS	POC	KIL	HAG	POC	TAL	DEL	FRS	ISF	TOL	DSF	SLM	ATL; 19																			86th	-	
1990	Bailey Racing	36	Pontiac	DAY; DNQ	ATL	KIL	TAL	FRS	POC	KIL	TOL	HAG	POC	TAL	MCH; 14	ISF	TOL	DSF	WIN	DEL	ATL; 42																		65th	-	
1991	Bailey Racing	36	Pontiac	DAY	ATL	KIL	TAL	TOL	FRS	POC	MCH; 5	KIL	FRS	DEL	POC	TAL	HPT	MCH; 8	ISF	TOL	DSF	TWS; 25	ATL; 35																48th	-	
1992	Bailey Racing	36	Pontiac	DAY	FIF	TWS; 22	TAL	TOL	KIL	POC	MCH; 40	FRS	KIL	NSH	DEL	POC	HPT	FRS	ISF	TOL	DSF	TWS; 36	SLM	ATL; 17															43rd	-	
1993	Bailey Racing	36	Pontiac	DAY	FIF	TWS; 35	TAL	KIL	CMS	FRS	TOL	POC	MCH; 16	FRS	POC	KIL	ISF	DSF	TOL	SLM	WIN	ATL; 30																	53rd	-	
1994	Bailey Racing	36	Pontiac	DAY	TAL	FIF	LVL	KIL	TOL	FRS	MCH	DMS	POC	POC	KIL	FRS	INF	I70	ISF	DSF	TOL	SLM	WIN	ATL; 41															109th	305	
1996	Bailey Racing	36	Pontiac	DAY	ATL	SLM	TAL	FIF	LVL	CLT	CLT	KIL	FRS	POC	MCH	FRS	TOL	POC	MCH	INF	SBS	ISF	DSF	KIL	SLM	WIN	CLT; 33	ATL											124th	-	
Results before 1985 may be incomplete.
