= Red Farmer =

American racing driver (born 1932)

- Born: Charles Farmer; October 15, 1932 (age 94); Nashville, Tennessee, U.S.
- Achievements: 1969, 1970, 1971 NASCAR Late Model Sportsman Division Champion; 1956 NASCAR Winston Modified Tour Champion
- Awards: Named one of NASCAR's 50 Greatest Drivers (1998); National Dirt Late Model Hall of Fame (2002); International Motorsports Hall of Fame (2004); NASCAR Hall of Fame (2022); Named one of NASCAR's 75 Greatest Drivers (2023)

NASCAR Cup Series career
- 36 races run over 13 years
- Best finish: 50th (1968)
- First race: 1953 untitled race (Daytona Beach)
- Last race: 1975 Talladega 500 (Talladega)
Wins	Top tens	Poles
0	3	0

NASCAR O'Reilly Auto Parts Series career
- 2 races run over 1 year
- Best finish: 72nd (1992)
- First race: 1992 Fram Filter 500k (Talladega)
- Last race: 1992 Kroger 200 (IRP)
Wins	Top tens	Poles
0	0	0

ARCA Menards Series career
- 34 races run over 21 years
- Best finish: 23rd (1985)
- First race: 1969 Daytona ARCA 300 (Daytona)
- Last race: 2004 Southern Illinois 100 (DuQuoin)
- First win: 1970 Nashville 200 (Nashville)
- Last win: 1988 ARCA 500K (Talladega)
Wins	Top tens	Poles
3	22	0
- Statistics up to date as of July 30, 2023.

Charles "Red" Farmer (born October 15, 1932) is an American professional stock car racing and dirt track racing driver. He currently competes part-time in 602 Crate Dirt Late Models in the No. F97 Ford Mustang for his own team. He is a member of the Alabama Gang.

== Racing career ==
Farmer's first race was at Opa-locka Speedway near Miami, Florida in a 1934 Ford in 1948. He became famous as a member of the Alabama Gang and he considered his hometown to be Hueytown, Alabama. Estimates of Farmer's career victories range from 700 to 900 victories, most occurring in the late 1950s and early 60's. He raced 36 NASCAR Cup Series races from 1953 to 1975. He won numerous championships at local tracks. Before racing in the Grand National series, he raced modified stock cars in the northeast. He was one of the first to transition from the modified series to the early Grand National Series. He was the NASCAR National Late Model Sportsman champion (later Xfinity Series) for three consecutive years from 1969 to 1971. Farmer's best finish in NASCAR's top division was fourth at both the 1972 Talladega 500, and the 1968 Middle Georgia 500 near Macon, Georgia. He entered so few Cup races because he was content to run primarily in the Late Model Sportsman Series. He was named NASCAR's most popular driver four times. Farmer raced in the white and gold number 97 car. In the mid-60's, however, Farmer raced a white, gold, and red Ford Fairlane, number F-97.

Farmer was Davey Allison's crew chief in the Busch Series.

Farmer has retained his skills as a driver in spite of his age. He competed in two Busch Grand National races in 1992, and the season opening ARCA event at Daytona in 1993. In June 2005, at age 72, Farmer turned heads in winning a heat over current NASCAR Sprint Cup stars, and finished eighth in the feature during the Sprint Prelude to the Dream at Eldora Speedway, owned by Tony Stewart.

As of 2022, Farmer still regularly competes in a late model at Talladega Short Track, a 1/3 mile oval dirt track in Eastaboga, Alabama located near the Talladega Superspeedway. His grandson, Lee Burdett, also races there.

Farmer's house, race shop, race hauler, and dirt late model were damaged by a tornado on March 25, 2021.

== Awards ==
Farmer's accolades are numerous, being a member of five halls of fame. Farmer was named one of the 50 Greatest Drivers in NASCAR history in 1998. He was a member of the first Class of Inductees into the Talladega-Texaco Walk Of Fame. When the International Motorsports Hall of Fame inducted Farmer, they had to waive their rule of 5 years of retirement – they figured he never would retire. Red Farmer was inducted into the NASCAR Hall of Fame in 2022.

== Helicopter crash ==
On July 12, 1993, Farmer was a passenger in a helicopter crash at Talladega Superspeedway that took the life of NASCAR Winston Cup driver Davey Allison, which occurred as Allison was attempting to land the aircraft in a nearby parking lot. The two were en route to the track in order to watch David Bonnett (son of fellow Alabama Gang driver Neil Bonnett) drive in a practice session. Farmer suffered a broken collarbone and fractured ribs in the crash.

== Motorsports career results ==
=== NASCAR ===
(key) (Bold – Pole position awarded by qualifying time. Italics – Pole position earned by points standings or practice time. * – Most laps led.)

==== Grand National Series ====
NASCAR Grand National Series results
Year	Team	No.	Make	1	2	3	4	5	6	7	8	9	10	11	12	13	14	15	16	17	18	19	20	21	22	23	24	25	26	27	28	29	30	31	32	33	34	35	36	37	38	39	40	41	42	43	44	45	46	47	48	49	50	51	52	53	54	55	56	NGNC	Pts	Ref
1953	Sikes Motors	48	Hudson	PBS	DAB; 45	HAR	NWS	CLT	RCH	CCS	LAN	CLB	HCY	MAR	PMS	RSP	LOU	FFS	LAN	TCS	WIL	MCF	PIF	MOR	ATL	RVS	LCF	DAV	HBO	AWS	PAS	HCY	DAR	CCS	LAN	BLF	WIL	NWS	MAR	ATL																				176th	13	
1956	J. M. Fitzgibbons	C97	Chevy	HCY	CLT	WSS	PBS; 15	ASF	DAB; 36	PBS; 17	WIL	ATL	NWS	LAN	RCH	CLB	CON	GPS	HCY	HBO	MAR	LIN	CLT	POR	EUR	NYF	MER	MAS	CLT	MCF	POR	AWS	RSP	PIF	CSF	CHI	CCF	MGY	OKL	ROA	OBS	SAN	NOR	PIF	MYB	POR	DAR	CSH	CLT	LAN	POR	CLB	HBO	NWP	CLT	CCF	MAR	HCY	WIL	154th	-	
1960	Long-Lewis	88	Ford	CLT	CLB	DAY; 20	DAY	DAY; 56	CLT	NWS	PHO	CLB	MAR	HCY	WIL	BGS	GPS	AWS	DAR	PIF	HBO	RCH	HMS	CLT	BGS	DAY	HEI	MAB	MBS	ATL	BIR	NSV	AWS	PIF	CLB	SBO	BGS	DAR	HCY	CSF	GSP	HBO	MAR	NWS	CLT	RCH	ATL													131st	120	
1962	Frank Rhoads	23	Ford	CON	AWS	DAY	DAY; 11	DAY; 40	CON	AWS	SVH	HBO	RCH	CLB	NWS	GPS	MBS	MAR	BGS	BRI	RCH	HCY	CON	DAR	PIF	CLT	ATL	BGS	AUG	RCH	SBO	DAY	CLB	ASH	GPS	AUG	SVH	MBS	BRI	CHT	NSV	HUN	AWS	STR	BGS	PIF	VAL	DAR	HCY	RCH	DTS	AUG	MAR	NWS	CLT	ATL				90th	360	
1965		26	Ford	RSD	DAY	DAY	DAY; 36	PIF	AWS	RCH	HBO	ATL	GPS	NWS	MAR	CLB	BRI	DAR	LGY	BGS	HCY	CLT	CCF	ASH	HAR	NSV	BIR	ATL	GPS	MBS	VAL	DAY	ODS	OBS	ISP	GLN	BRI	NSV	CCF	AWS	SMR	PIF	AUG	CLB	DTS	BLV	BGS	DAR	HCY	LIN	ODS	RCH	MAR	NWS	CLT	HBO	CAR	DTS		104th	208	
1967	Ben Arnold	76	Ford	AUG	RSD	DAY	DAY; 14	DAY; 42	AWS	BRI	GPS	BGS	ATL	CLB	HCY	NWS	MAR	SVH	RCH	DAR	BLV	LGY	CLT	ASH	MGR	SMR	BIR	CAR	GPS	MGY	DAY	TRN	OXF	FDA	ISP	BRI	SMR	NSV	ATL	BGS	CLB	SVH	DAR	HCY	RCH	BLV	HBO	MAR	NWS											54th	2546	
1967	Gray Racing	97	Ford																																															CLT; 31	CAR; 11	AWS								54th	2546	
1968	Long-Lewis	97	Ford	MGR; 4	MGY; 29	RSD	DAY; 43	BRI	RCH	ATL; 30	HCY	GPS	CLB	NWS	MAR	AUG	AWS	DAR	BLV	LGY	CLT	ASH	MGR	SMR	BIR	CAR	GPS	DAY	ISP	OXF	FDA	TRN	BRI	SMR	NSV	ATL; 34	CLB	BGS	AWS	SBO	LGY	DAR	HCY	RCH	BLV	HBO	MAR	NWS	AUG	CLT; 26	CAR; 31	JFC								50th	407	
1969	Donald Brackins	2	Chevy	MGR	MGY; 20	RSD	DAY	DAY	DAY	CAR	AUG	BRI	ATL	CLB	HCY	GPS	RCH	NWS	MAR	AWS	DAR	BLV	LGY	CLT	MGR	SMR	MCH	KPT	GPS	NCF	DAY	DOV	TPN	TRN	BLV	BRI	NSV	SMR	ATL	MCH	SBO	BGS	AWS	DAR	HCY	RCH	TAL	CLB	MAR	NWS	CLT	SVH	AUG	CAR	JFC	MGR	TWS			92nd	31	
1971	Giachetti Brothers Racing	44	Ford	RSD	DAY	DAY; 10	DAY; 32																																																					NA	-	
1971	Giachetti Brothers Racing	46	Ford					ONT; 40	RCH	CAR	HCY	BRI	ATL	CLB	GPS	SMR	NWS	MAR	DAR	SBO	TAL	ASH	KPT	CLT	DOV	MCH	RSD	HOU	GPS	DAY	BRI	AST	ISP	TRN	NSV	ATL	BGS	ONA	MCH	TAL	CLB	HCY	DAR	MAR	CLT	DOV	CAR	MGR	RCH	NWS	TWS									NA	-	

==== Winston Cup Series ====
NASCAR Winston Cup Series results
Year	Team	No.	Make	1	2	3	4	5	6	7	8	9	10	11	12	13	14	15	16	17	18	19	20	21	22	23	24	25	26	27	28	29	30	31	NWCC	Pts	Ref
1972	Long-Lewis	97	Ford	RSD	DAY; 30	RCH	ONT; 41	CAR	ATL; 31	BRI	DAR	NWS	MAR	TAL; 39	CLT	DOV	MCH	RSD	TWS	DAY	BRI	TRN	ATL	TAL; 4	MCH	NSV	DAR	RCH	DOV	MAR	NWS	CLT	CAR	TWS	63rd	749.5	
1973	Long-Lewis	97	Ford	RSD	DAY; 32	RCH	CAR	BRI	ATL	NWS	DAR	MAR	TAL; 32	NSV	CLT	DOV	TWS	RSD	MCH	DAY	BRI	ATL	TAL; 32	NSV	DAR	RCH	DOV	NWS	MAR	CLT	CAR				72nd	-	
1974	Long-Lewis	97	Ford	RSD	DAY; DNQ	RCH	CAR	BRI	ATL	DAR	NWS	MAR	TAL; 27	NSV	DOV	CLT	RSD	MCH	DAY	BRI	NSV	ATL	POC	TAL; 23	MCH	DAR	RCH	DOV	NWS	MAR	CLT	CAR	ONT		76th	5.22	
1975	Long-Lewis	97	Ford	RSD	DAY; QL^{†}	RCH	CAR	BRI	ATL	NWS	DAR	MAR	TAL; 37	NSV	DOV	CLT	RSD	MCH	DAY	NSV	POC	TAL; 44	MCH	DAR	DOV	NWS	MAR	CLT	RCH	CAR	BRI	ATL	ONT		96th	83	
^{†} – Qualified for Bob Burcham

===== Daytona 500 =====
Year	Team	Manufacturer	Start	Finish
1960	Long-Lewis	Ford	39	56
1962	Frank Rhoads	Ford	23	40
1965		Ford	42	36
1967	Ben Arnold	Ford	28	42
1968	Long-Lewis	Ford	30	43
1971	Giachetti Brothers Racing	Ford	22	32
1972	Long-Lewis	Ford	18	30
1973	Long-Lewis	Ford	23	32
1974	Long-Lewis	Ford	DNQ	
1975	Long-Lewis	Ford	QL	

==== Busch Series ====
NASCAR Busch Series results
Year	Team	No.	Make	1	2	3	4	5	6	7	8	9	10	11	12	13	14	15	16	17	18	19	20	21	22	23	24	25	26	27	28	29	30	31	NBSC	Pts	Ref
1992	Allison Racing	28	Ford	DAY	CAR	RCH	ATL	MAR	DAR	BRI	HCY	LAN	DUB	NZH	CLT; DNQ	DOV	ROU	MYB	GLN	VOL	NHA	TAL; 22	IRP; 17	ROU	MCH	NHA	BRI	DAR	RCH	DOV	CLT	MAR	CAR	HCY	72nd	209	

=== ARCA Re/Max Series ===
(key) (Bold – Pole position awarded by qualifying time. Italics – Pole position earned by points standings or practice time. * – Most laps led.)

ARCA Re/Max Series results
Year	Team	No.	Make	1	2	3	4	5	6	7	8	9	10	11	12	13	14	15	16	17	18	19	20	21	22	ARMC	Pts	Ref
1985	Corvin Racing	97	Chevy	ATL	DAY; 3	ATL	TAL; 3	ATL	SSP	IRP	CSP	FRS	IRP	OEF	ISF	DSF	TOL									59th	-	
1986	White Racing	97	Buick	ATL	DAY	ATL	TAL; 24	SIR	SSP	FRS	KIL	CSP	TAL; 23	BLN	ISF	DSF	TOL	MCS	ATL							59th	-	
1987	White Racing	99	Buick	DAY; 37	ATL																					49th	-	
1987	White Racing	97	Buick			TAL; 3	DEL	ACS	TOL	ROC	POC	FRS	KIL	TAL; 10	FRS	ISF	INF	DSF	SLM	ATL						49th	-	
1988	White Racing	97	Buick	DAY; 2	ATL																					54th	-	
1988	Allison Racing	28	Chevy			TAL; 1*	FRS	PCS	ROC	POC	WIN	KIL	ACS	SLM	POC	TAL; 27	DEL	FRS	ISF	DSF	SLM	ATL				54th	-	
1989	Allison Racing	28	Buick	DAY; 8	ATL	KIL	TAL; 25	FRS	POC	KIL	HAG	POC	TAL; 30	DEL	FRS	ISF	TOL	DSF	SLM	ATL						52nd	-	
1990	Ragan Racing	97	Ford	DAY; 7	ATL	KIL	TAL; DNQ	FRS	POC	KIL	TOL	HAG	POC													69th	-	
1990	Ragan Racing	74	Ford											TAL; 4	MCH	ISF	TOL	DSF	WIN	DEL	ATL					69th	-	
1991	Compton Racing	74	Ford	DAY; 42	ATL	KIL	TAL	TOL	FRS	POC	MCH	KIL	FRS	DEL	POC	TAL	HPT	MCH	ISF	TOL	DSF	TWS	ATL			117th	-	
1992	Compton Racing	69	Ford	DAY	FIF	TWS	TAL; 6	TOL	KIL	POC	MCH	FRS	KIL	NSH	DEL	POC	HPT	FRS	ISF	TOL	DSF	TWS	SLM	ATL		125th	-	
1993	Allison Racing	97	Ford	DAY; 28	FIF	TWS	TAL	KIL	CMS	FRS	TOL	POC	MCH	FRS	POC	KIL	ISF	DSF	TOL	SLM	WIN	ATL				113th	-	
2002	ML Motorsports	97	Pontiac	DAY	ATL	NSH	SLM	KEN	CLT	KAN	POC	MCH	TOL; 34													52nd	540	
2002	ML Motorsports	75	Pontiac											SBO; 23	KEN	BLN; 32	POC	NSH	ISF; 32	WIN	DSF; 4	CHI	SLM	TAL	CLT	52nd	540	
2004	ML Motorsports	97	Chevy	DAY	NSH	SLM	KEN	TOL	CLT	KAN	POC	MCH	SBO	BLN	KEN	GTW	POC	LER	NSH	ISF; 5	TOL	DSF; 10	CHI	SLM	TAL	68th	400	
