= David Pearson (racing driver) =

American racing driver (1934–2018)

- Pearson at Lavonia Speedway on April 14, 1979 An editor has nominated the above file for discussion of its purpose and/or potential deletion. You are welcome to participate in the discussion and help reach a consensus.
- Born: David Gene Pearson; December 22, 1934; Spartanburg, South Carolina, U.S.
- Died: November 12, 2018 (aged 83); Spartanburg, South Carolina, U.S.
- Achievements: As Driver: 1966, 1968, 1969 NASCAR Grand National Series Champion; 1976 Daytona 500 Winner; 1976, 1977, 1979 Southern 500 Winner; 1961, 1974, 1976 World 600 Winner; 1972, 1973, 1974 Winston 500 Winner; NASCAR Triple Crown Winner (1976); Records: 10 wins at Darlington Raceway (all time winner); 9 wins at Michigan International Speedway (all time winner); 13 poles at Charlotte Motor Speedway (all time leader) including record 11 in a row 12 poles at Darlington Raceway (all time leader); Led Winston Cup Series in wins (1966, 1968, 1973, 1976); Led Winston Cup Series in poles (1964, 1968, 1973, 1974, 1975, 1976); As Car Owner: 1986, 1987 NASCAR Busch Series Champion (outright and in owners points)
- Awards: 1960 NASCAR Grand National Series Rookie of the Year; 1979 NASCAR Winston Cup Series Most Popular Driver; 1980 NASCAR Winston West Series Most Popular Driver; Olsonite American Driver Of The Year (1976); Named one of NASCAR's 50 Greatest Drivers (1998); International Motorsports Hall of Fame (1990); Motorsports Hall of Fame of America (1993); NASCAR Hall of Fame (2011); Named one of NASCAR's 75 Greatest Drivers (2023)

NASCAR Cup Series career
- 574 races run over 27 years
- Best finish: 1st (1966, 1968, 1969)
- First race: 1960 Daytona 500 qualifier #1 (Daytona)
- Last race: 1986 Champion Spark Plug 400 (Michigan)
- First win: 1961 World 600 (Charlotte)
- Last win: 1980 CRC Chemicals Rebel 500 (Darlington)
Wins	Top tens	Poles
105	366	113

NASCAR O'Reilly Auto Parts Series career
- 6 races run over 2 years
- Best finish: 35th (1982)
- First race: 1982 Southeastern 150 (Bristol)
- Last race: 1983 Sportsman 200 (Dover)
- First win: 1982 Coca-Cola 200 (Rockingham)
Wins	Top tens	Poles
1	4	3

NASCAR Grand National East Series career
- 3 races run over 1 year
- First race: 1972 Bold City 200 Jacksonville
- Last race: 1972 Gamecock 200 Columbia
- First win: 1972 Bold City 200 Jacksonville
Wins	Top tens	Poles
1	2	0

ARCA Menards Series West career
- 7 races run over 4 years
- Best finish: 29th (1980)
- First race: 1964 Motor Trend 500 (Riverside)
- Last race: 1980 Reed Cams 200 (Evergreen)
Wins	Top tens	Poles
0	3	0
- Statistics up to date as of August 17, 2026.

David Gene Pearson (December 22, 1934 – November 12, 2018), nicknamed The Fox and later The Silver Fox, was an American professional stock car racing driver and team owner, who raced from 1960 to 1986 in the now NASCAR Cup Series. Throughout his career, Pearson raced under several car numbers, though he was most prominently known for driving the No. 21 Mercury Montego and Cougar for Wood Brothers Racing between 1972 and 1979 in the Cup Series.

Pearson won the 1960 NASCAR Rookie of the Year award and three Cup Series championships (1966, 1968, and 1969). NASCAR described his 1974 season as an indication of his "consistent greatness", finishing third in the season points having competed in only nineteen of thirty races. Pearson's career paralleled Richard Petty's, the driver who has won the most races in NASCAR history. They accounted for 63 first/second-place finishes, with the edge going to Pearson. Petty had two-hundred wins in 1,184 starts, while Pearson had 105 wins in 574 starts.

At his finalist nomination for the NASCAR Hall of Fame's inaugural 2010 class, NASCAR described Pearson as "... the model of NASCAR efficiency during his career. With little exaggeration, when Pearson showed up at a race track, he won." Pearson ended his career in 1986, and holds the second position on NASCAR's all-time win list with 105 victories; as well as achieving 113 pole positions. Pearson was successful in different venues of racing; he won three times on road courses, 48 times on superspeedways, 54 times on short tracks, and had 23 dirt track wins. Pearson finished with at least one top-ten finish in each of his 27 seasons. ESPN described him as being a "plain-spoken, humble man, and that added up to...."

Petty had high praises for Pearson, saying, "He could beat you on a short track, he could beat you on a superspeedway, he could beat you on a road course, he could beat you on a dirt track. It didn't hurt as bad to lose to Pearson as it did to some of the others, because I knew how good he was." Pearson said of Petty: "I always felt that if I beat him I beat the best, and I heard he said the same thing about me." Petty went further by saying that he believed Pearson would have pulled off 200 victories like him, if he ran the full schedules of NASCAR racing.

== Background ==
Pearson was born near Spartanburg, South Carolina. When Pearson was young, he climbed a tree at the local stock car racing track (Spartanburg Fairgrounds) to see the races. Pearson said, "I'd always been interested in cars, and I decided right then that was what I wanted to do with my life." He worked with his brother in a car body repair shop and used the money earned to purchase a Ford coach. Pearson removed the fenders to convert the vehicle into a street rod. He jumped the car over ditches until he rolled it over. His mother paid him to junk the car, and he used the money to purchase another car to build. In 1952, he raced a 1940 Ford at dirt tracks and won $30 in an outlaw class race. He kept winning and attracted the attention of Spartanburg's racing community, including Joe Littlejohn.

== Career ==
=== 1960s ===
Pearson began racing in NASCAR's Grand National series during the 1960 season shortly after winning the 1959 track championship at Greenville-Pickens Speedway. His first NASCAR start was the first 1960 Daytona 500 qualifying race and he finished 17th in a self-owned car that he had purchased from Jack White. He started 22 events that season, finishing 23rd in season points and was voted the 1960 NASCAR Rookie of the Year. His season was highlighted by a second-place finish at Gamecock Speedway (Sumter, South Carolina), a fourth-place finish at Hickory Motor Speedway and fifth after starting on the pole position at his hometown track at Piedmont Interstate Fairgrounds in Spartanburg.

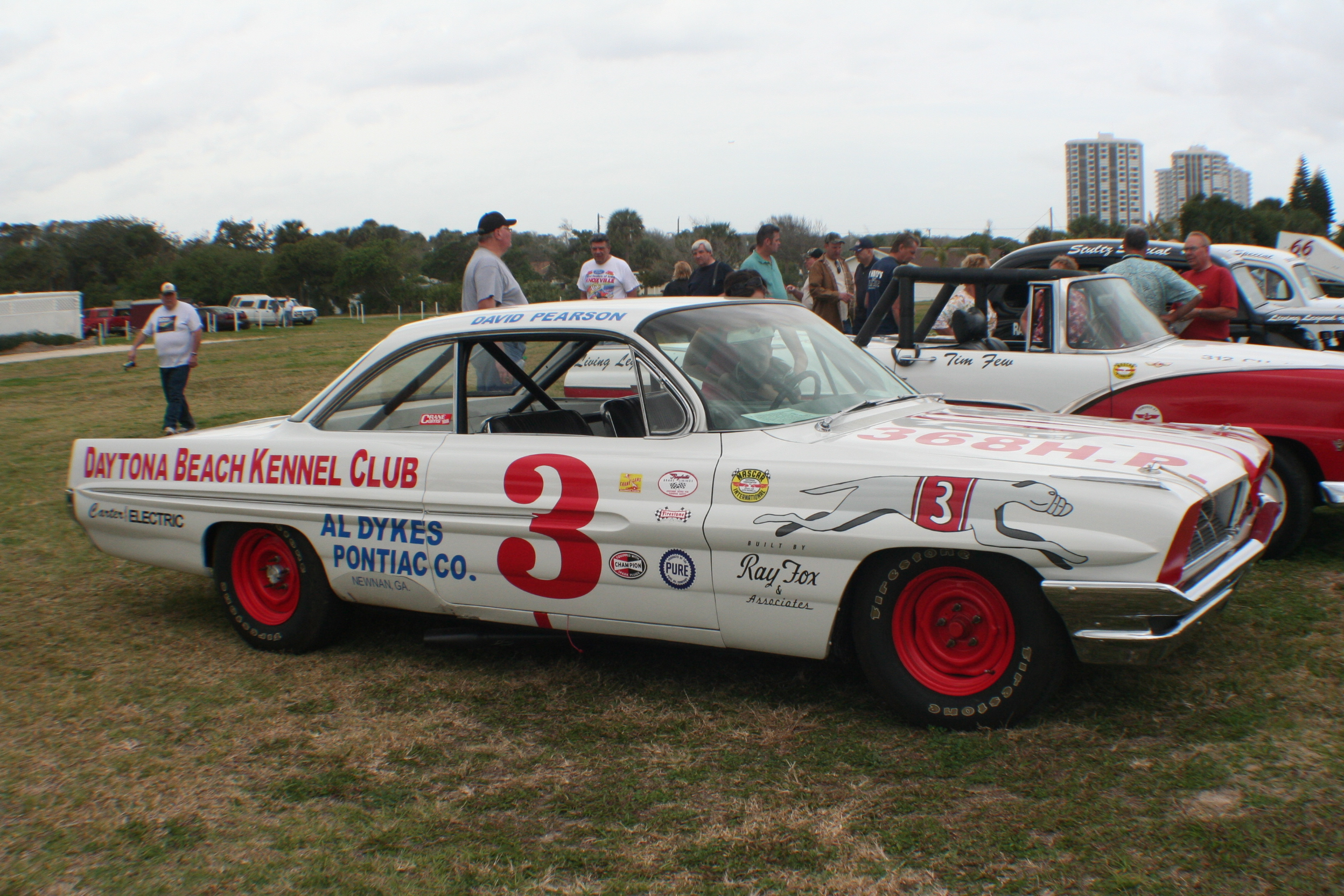
Pearson's 1961 Pontiac, prepared by Ray Fox

When Pearson bent the frame of his own race car early in the 1961 season, he began working as a house roofer in Spartanburg to support his family, which included two sons. Darel Dieringer had a contract dispute with a tire company and was not able to compete in the inaugural World 600 at Charlotte. Littlejohn was at the track, and he recommended that car builder Ray Fox hire Pearson. Pearson was unsure if he should join the team, and Fox was not convinced that he should trust his car to the relatively untested 26-year-old driver.

After Pearson had a successful test run, he qualified the car with the third fastest time behind Richard Petty and Joe Weatherly. Pearson raced his way into the lead early in the event and was the leader after the first round of pit stops. Pearson and Petty were the only two cars on the lead lap by a restart on the 311th lap (of 400). Petty made up six seconds on Pearson in twenty laps before Petty had to retire with a blown engine. Pearson held a three lap lead over Fireball Roberts and was leading late in the race until he ran over some debris on the backstretch and blew a tire with only two laps remaining. Pearson drove the car around the track slowly for the final lap at approximately 20 miles per hour (32 km/h) to take the victory.

Pearson started in 19 races during the 1961 season and he had three wins to finish thirteenth in season points, winning his first NASCAR race in a Fox-prepared car at Concord Speedway. Later in the season, he won the Firecracker 250 at Daytona and the Dixie 400 at Atlanta.

Pearson started in only twelve of 53 events in 1962 yet managed to finish tenth in season points. Pearson began the season racing for Fox until Fox retired; he started for Petty Enterprises, Cotton Owens, and Bud Moore that season. He had seven top ten finishes and no wins. During 41 starts in 55 races, Pearson finished the 1963 season sixth in points for Cotton Owens. He held two pole positions and had no wins.

In 1964, Pearson had eight wins at Richmond, Greenville-Pickens Speedway, Occoneechee Speedway, Boyd Speedway, Lincoln Speedway, Rambi Raceway, Columbia Speedway and Hickory Motor Speedway. Pearson finished third in the championship, which was won by Petty for the first time. He qualified on the pole position for twelve events.

NASCAR banned the Mopar Hemi engine in 1965, so Petty and Pearson boycotted many races rather than compete with a non-competitive engine against Ford and Mercury drivers. Both competed in drag racing. Pearson drove a Dodge Dart station wagon nicknamed the "Cotton Picker" for Owens. NASCAR owner Bill France Sr. adjusted the engine rules later in the season to bring back Mopar drivers; Petty and Pearson ended up competing in fourteen of 55 events. Pearson won two of the final 21 races (Columbia and Richmond) to finish fortieth in the season points.

In his second full-time season, Pearson won his first of three NASCAR championships in 1966. He won fifteen of 49 events, which was the second most in NASCAR history at that time. Early in the season, Pearson won at Hickory, Columbia, Greenville-Pickens, and Winston-Salem Speedway to complete four straight victories. Throughout the season, Pearson won at Richmond, Dog Track Speedway, New Asheville Speedway, Smokey Mountain Raceway, the second Greenville-Pickens race, Bridgehampton Race Circuit, Fonda Speedway, Bowman Gray Stadium, and the second Richmond race.

Pearson ran a partial season in 1967, competing in 22 of 48 races. He began the season racing for Cotton Owens before switching after the thirteenth race to Holman Moody. Pearson quit after there was a misunderstanding about who would drive the team's tow truck. Dodge decided to stop racing in NASCAR, so Pearson switched away from Owen's Dodges in favor of Holman Moody's Fords. He had two wins (Bristol, Greenville-Pickens), both for Owens, in a season that was dominated by Petty's all-time record 27 victories (including all-time record ten straight). Pearson finished seventh in season points.

In the second season of running the full schedule, Petty and Pearson each won 16 races during 1968; Pearson won the championship and Petty finished third. Pearson competed primarily for Holman-Moody, winning at Bristol, Richmond, North Wilkesboro, Asheville-Weaverville Speedway, Darlington, Beltsville Speedway, Langley Field Speedway, Charlotte, Middle Georgia Raceway, Bristol, Nashville Speedway, Columbia, Bowman-Gray, Asheville-Weaverville, Hickory, and Augusta Speedway. He added twelve pole positions.

Pearson won his third and final championship in his final season running the full schedule in 1969. The championship tied Pearson with Lee Petty for the most championships in NASCAR history (Richard Petty, Dale Earnhardt and Jimmie Johnson hold the current record with seven titles each). He started out the season at the 1969 Daytona 500 by being the first driver to qualify faster than 190 miles per hour with a speed of 190.029 miles per hour (305.822 km/h).

In 51 starts, Pearson had eleven wins, 42 top-fives, and 44 top-tens. He earned a record $229,760 for his effort. Pearson completed 14,270 laps in 1969, which is the most laps ever in a NASCAR Cup season. He was one of eleven drivers to boycott the first race at Talladega after concerns with the tires; he rejoined the tour at the following event.

=== 1970s ===
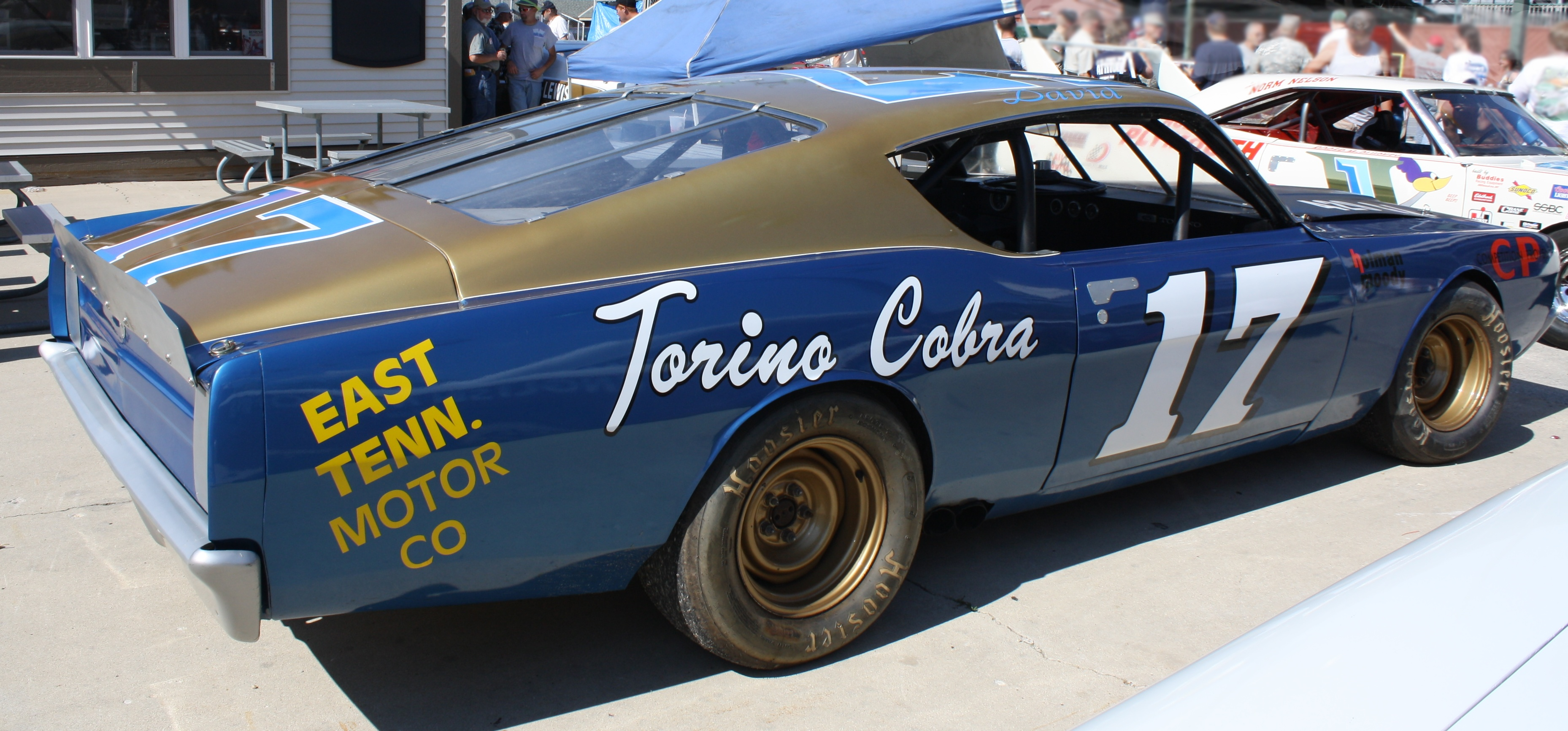
A Pearson Holman Moody car

The 1970 season started with Pearson competing part-time, as he would for the rest of his career. Pearson led the Daytona 500 under caution with thirteen laps remaining and changed only his right side tires in a two-tire pit stop. Pete Hamilton did a four-tire stop and passed Pearson after the restart for the victory. In nineteen starts, he won a single race (Darlington) and earned two pole positions (Bristol, Darlington) to finish 23rd in points.

R. J. Reynolds began sponsoring NASCAR in 1971 and the Grand National series was retitled the Winston Cup Series. Holman Moody and Pearson split near the middle of the season after Pearson refused to take a 10% pay cut. He won two races before the split (Daytona Twin 125 and Bristol) and four-second-place finishes. Pearson finished the season by competing in seven races for Ray Nichels. He recorded one top-ten finish (eighth at the July Daytona race), but suffered mechanical problems in all of the other races. For the season he finished 51st in points after competing in 17 races with nine top-tens and eight top-fives.

At R. J. Reynolds' request, NASCAR began cutting down on the number of races in 1972 season by eliminating midweek races. It also dropped thirteen short tracks and had a 31-race schedule. Pearson began racing for the Wood Brothers that season. He raced in seventeen of the events and had six wins, which earned him a twentieth place finish in the season points. Pearson was racing against Bobby Isaac and Buddy Baker at the end of the Winston 500 at Talladega Superspeedway when Jimmy Crawford spun into Isaac; Pearson won the race. He won later that season at the Firecracker 400, a race that he would win three straight times.

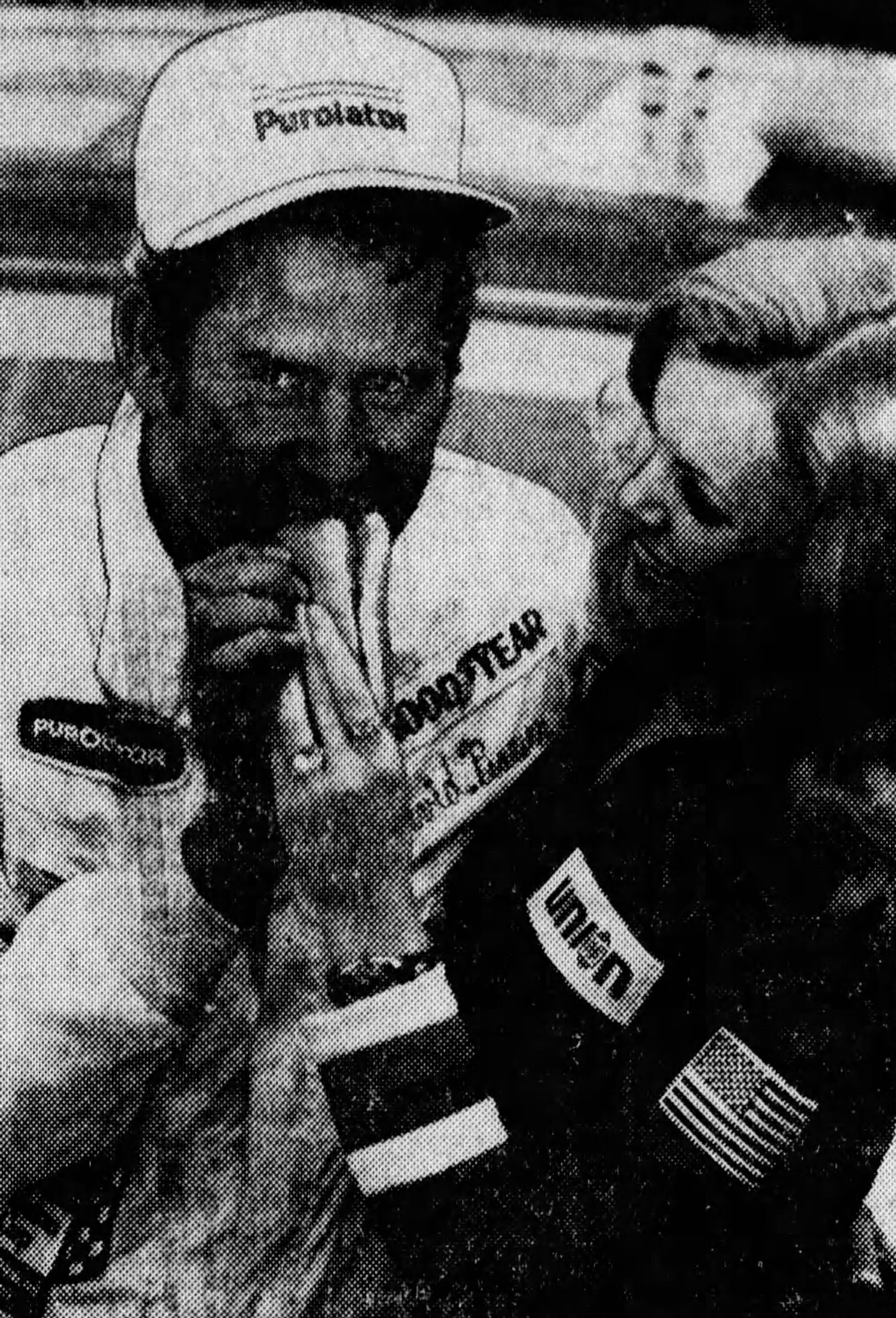
Pearson eating a hot dog after winning the 1973 Winston 500

While Pearson only started in 18 (of 28) races during 1973, he was named the NASCAR driver of the Year after finishing eighth in points. He won eleven of those eighteen races in the Wood Brothers Mercury. His 61% win percentage is the highest in NASCAR history. He had wins at North Carolina Motor Speedway (Rockingham), Atlanta, Darlington, Martinsville, Talladega, Dover, Michigan, second Daytona race, second Atlanta race, second Dover race, and the second Rockingham race. The remaining seven races contained four Did Not Finishes (DNFs), two-second-place finishes and one third place. At the first Rockingham event, Pearson led 499 of 500 miles, giving up the lead only for a pit stop. He won eight pole positions with a 3.4 average starting position.

Pearson finished third in the 1974 points after competing in nineteen of thirty events. It was the only season where drivers were awarded points based on their money earnings, which ended up rewarding drivers who finished high in the big-money races. He won seven races, including the Winston 500 by 0.17 seconds over Benny Parsons. Pearson began to earn the nickname of "silver fox" after the 1974 Firecracker 400. Entering the final lap, he was leading followed closely by Petty. Fearing that Petty would do a slingshot pass, he slowed a little, pulled his car off to the side to simulate a blown motor, and threw his hand up in the air as a motion of defeat. Petty quickly passed opening a lead of several car lengths exiting turn 2. Using the draft, Pearson closed in quickly down the backstretch and through turns 3 and 4 and drew right behind Petty. Coming out of the final corner, Pearson pulled to the inside and did a slingshot pass back to win the race by a car length. The International Race of Champions (IROC) invited him to participate in their first annual all-star stock car racing series for the 1973–74 season and he finished fourth of the twelve drivers.

In 1975, NASCAR changed to the points system that it would use for nearly three decades until the current Chase for the Cup format was implemented in 2004. ABC televised the second half of the 1975 Daytona 500 and drew a 10.5 rating opposite an 8.6 rating for an NBA game and a 4.1 for an NHL game. Pearson took the lead back from Benny Parsons on lap 177 and began to pull away. Petty, who was eight laps down after several unscheduled pit stops due to engine overheating, began drafting with Parsons and the duo started closing on Pearson. With less than three laps to go, Pearson collided Cale Yarborough on the backstretch and spun out into the grass. Parsons won the race by a lap over Bobby Allison. After the race, Pearson complained that Petty showed favoritism by helping Parsons. His attempt to win his third consecutive Winston 500 fell short when he was unable to catch Baker. Despite these near-wins, he won three times in 21 attempts. He finished fourteenth in points in the thirty–event season. He competed in the second annual IROC season during 1974/75 and he finished sixth in points.

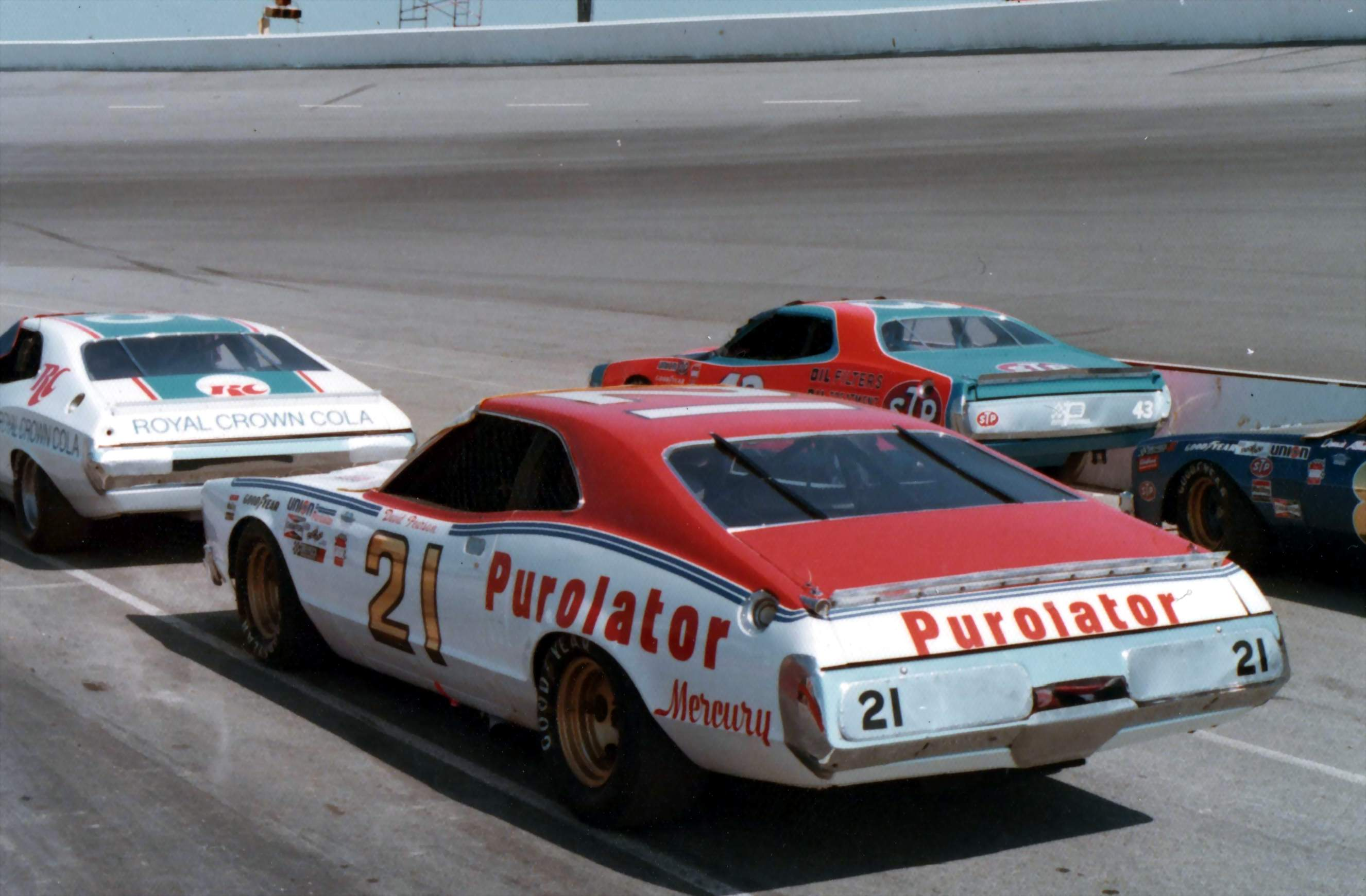
Pearson's No. 21 Mercury owned by the Wood Brothers

The 1976 Daytona 500 is known for the final lap battle between Pearson and Petty. In 2007, ESPN rated the race as the fourth most interesting Daytona 500. Petty was leading Pearson going into the last lap by a couple of car lengths. Pearson used the draft to attempt a slingshot pass against Petty at the end of the back stretch on the last lap, but his car pushed high into the final turn while going around another car. Petty edged under Pearson, and their cars crashed into each other on the frontstretch in the final turns. They both spun out into the infield grass approximately 100 feet (30 meters) short of the finish line. Benny Parsons who was driving the third place car, was over a lap behind the disabled cars. With Petty unable to restart his car, Pearson slowly drove his Wood Brothers Mercury over the grassy infield past the finish line for his only Daytona 500 victory. He won a series-best ten races in 1976, but finished ninth in season points after competing in only 22 of 30 events. He won his only IROC race at the first race of IROC III in 1975/1976 at Michigan International Speedway and finished fifth in points.

Pearson finished 13th in the 1977 NASCAR points, with two wins in 22 (of thirty) races. IROC invited him to participate in IROC IV in 1976/77 and he finished ninth in the four race series.

Pearson competed in 22 races (of thirty) again in 1978, winning four times for a sixteenth place finish in the season points. In March, Pearson won his one-hundredth Winston Cup race at Rockingham. Late in the World 600, Pearson was battling for the win against Parsons until Parsons' spin collected both drivers. Darrell Waltrip edged Donnie Allison for the victory. Pearson competed in his final IROC race in June 1978 during IROC V.

Pearson began 1979 by winning the pole position at year's first race at Riverside; he finished in second place. 1979 was Pearson's final season racing for the Wood Brothers, with his last race happening at Darlington. After a miscommunication, he left the pits without waiting for the pit crew to place lug nuts on the car and the tires fell off the car when he reached the end of pit lane. Pearson quit the team after the race. Pearson had won 43 races between 1972 and 79 while driving for the Wood Brothers. Later during the season, Rod Osterlund's rookie driver, Dale Earnhardt, suffered a shoulder injury. Osterlund hired Pearson to replace Earnhardt during four races; he collected the pole position at Michigan and won the 1979 Southern 500. For the season, Pearson had competed in nine races and finished 32nd in points. Fans voted him as NASCAR's Most Popular Driver.

=== 1980s ===
Pearson raced for Hoss Ellington during the 1980 season. He won the rain shortened 1980 CRC Chemicals Rebel 500 at Darlington for his final Cup win. He started nine times to finish 37th in season points. Pearson qualified on the pole position at Charlotte for his eleventh straight time and he had started on the front row in fifteen straight races between 1972 and 1980. In 1981, he raced in six races for four owners. His season was highlighted by winning the pole position for Kennie Childers at Dover and two top-ten finishes at Darlington.

Bobby Hawkins hired Pearson to race in six events during 1982. He started on the pole position at Charlotte and Darlington and had top-five finishes at the July Daytona race and Charlotte. He ended the thirty-race season in 37th place in the point standings. Pearson entered his first NASCAR Busch Grand National (now Xfinity Series) race that season. He won the pole position for that race at Bristol and he finished second. Pearson raced in two more Busch races that season (Dover, North Carolina), starting second and first; he finished fifth and first. The North Carolina win was his only Busch victory.

Pearson raced in ten events for Hawkins in 1983. He had four top ten finishes, including eighth and third place finishes at Daytona, and finished 33rd in points. He started from the pole position for his final Busch Grand National race at Dover; it resulted in a twelfth place finish. In 1984, Pearson raced in eleven events for Hawkins and finished 41st in the season points. He had three top ten finishes, all ninth place finishes, at the Daytona 500, World 600, and the Miller 400.

Pearson raced in twelve races during 1985, the first eight for Hoss Ellington and the final four for himself. He had an average start of 9.2, but ten DNFs resulted in an average finish over thirtieth place. He had one top ten finish at the July Daytona race and finished 36th in points. 1986 was Pearson's final season in NASCAR. Pearson drove his own car in two events. After a DNF at Charlotte, he finished tenth in his final race at the August Michigan event.

After a three-year hiatus, Pearson planned to come out of retirement in 1989, replacing the injured Neil Bonnett in the Wood Brothers' No. 21 at Charlotte Motor Speedway. Following testing for the event, however, he suffered severe neck and back pain, and chose instead to announce his retirement; Tommy Ellis replaced Pearson for the race.

== Legacy ==
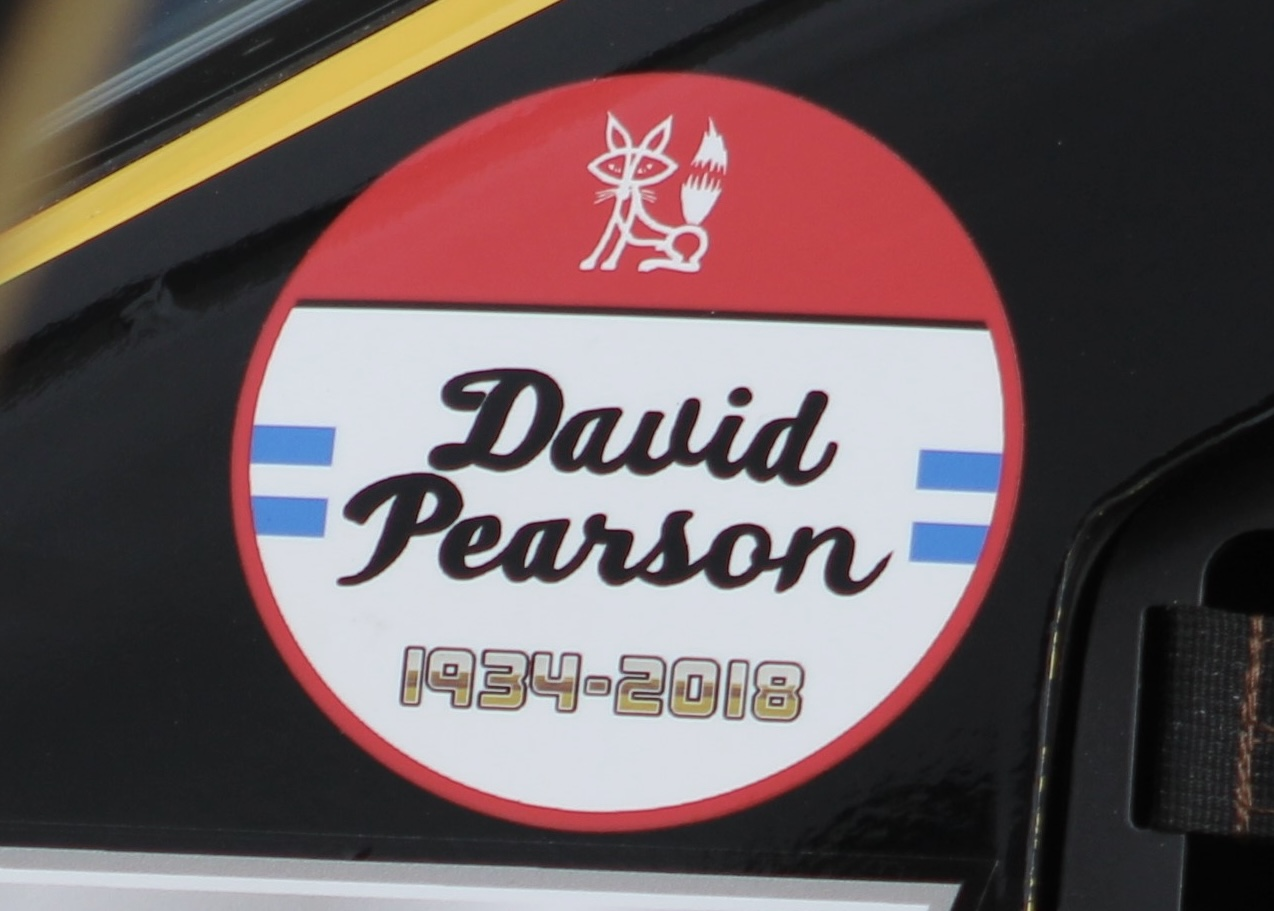
William Byron and Hendrick Motorsports sporting a Pearson tribute sticker in the 2018 season finale at Homestead-Miami Speedway.

The National Motor Sports Press Association's Hall of Fame inducted Pearson in 1991, and inducted into the Motorsports Hall of Fame of America in 1993. He was inducted in the International Motorsports Hall of Fame in 1993 and the Charlotte Motor Speedway Court of Legends in 1998. He was one of ten finalists for the Driver of the Quarter Century (1967–91) sponsored by a United States businessman; Mario Andretti won the award. In mid-1999, Sports Illustrated used votes from 40 NASCAR insiders to name Pearson the Top Stock Car Driver of the Twentieth Century.

In 2009, Pearson was one of the 25 nominees for the first class to be inducted into the NASCAR Hall of Fame. NASCAR named the five people to be inducted in its 2010 class and it stated that he finished between sixth and eighth place. Pearson left the premises ten minutes after the inductees were announced. The snub drew public criticism and some writers predicted that he will be the headliner for the 2011 class.

At the induction ceremony, Pearson said that he felt the inaugural class should include more pioneers such as Raymond Parks, Tim Flock, and Lee Petty. Pearson said "I feel like if I was going in next year and I knew Raymond Parks wasn't, I'd withdraw my name to get him in." In 2010, Pearson was named to the 2011 class in the NASCAR Hall of Fame. He received the most votes, from 50 of 53 voters. "I am just proud that that many people thought enough to vote for me", Pearson said. He added that he had not felt slighted by Bill France Jr. beating him into the 2010 class by one vote. He was inducted into the NASCAR Hall of Fame on May 23, 2011.

== Personal life ==
Pearson's wife Helen Ruth Pearson predeceased him in 1991. He had three sons, Larry Pearson, Ricky Pearson, and Eddie Pearson. Larry raced in NASCAR and he was the 1986 and 1987 Busch Series champion. Ricky Pearson was general manager and a crew chief for Buckshot Jones/Buckshot Racing when they won two Busch Series races.

In December 2014, Pearson suffered a mild stroke which partially paralyzed the left half of his body, from which he recovered. Pearson died on November 12, 2018, in Spartanburg, South Carolina, at the age of 83. No cause was given.

== Motorsports career results ==
=== NASCAR ===
(key) (Bold – Pole position awarded by qualifying time. Italics – Pole position earned by points standings or practice time. * – Most laps led.)

==== Grand National Series ====
NASCAR Grand National Series results
Year	Team	No.	Make	1	2	3	4	5	6	7	8	9	10	11	12	13	14	15	16	17	18	19	20	21	22	23	24	25	26	27	28	29	30	31	32	33	34	35	36	37	38	39	40	41	42	43	44	45	46	47	48	49	50	51	52	53	54	55	56	57	58	59	60	61	62	NGNC	Pts	Ref
1960	Pearson Racing	67	Chevy	CLT	CLB	DAY; 17	DAY	DAY; 28	CLT; 15	NWS; 19	PHO	CLB; 15	MAR; DNQ	HCY	WIL	BGS	GPS; 8	AWS	DAR	PIF; 5	HBO; 14	RCH	HMS	CLT; 10	BGS	DAY; 18	HEI	MAB	MBS; 11	ATL; 32	BIR	NSV	AWS	PIF; 18	CLB; 19	SBO	BGS	DAR; 27	HCY; 4	CSF	**GSP**; 2	HBO; 15	MAR; 7	NWS; 8	CLT; 21	RCH	ATL; 25																			23rd	5956	
1961	Pearson Racing	67	Chevy	CLT; 5	JSP; 16	DAY			PIF; 3	AWS	HMS		GPS; 10	HBO	BGS	MAR	NWS	CLB; 14	HCY	RCH	MAR	DAR	CLT	CLT	RSD	ASP		PIF; 17	BIR	GPS; 17	BGS	NOR	HAS; 4	STR			CLB; 17	MBS																												13th	13088	
1961	Tony Lavati	66	Pontiac				DAY; 17	DAY; 21																																																										13th	13088	
1961	Pearson Racing	26	Pontiac									ATL; 40																																																						13th	13088	
1961	John Masoni	3	Pontiac																								CLT; 1*								DAY; 1	ATL; 40			BRI; 30	NSV	BGS	AWS	RCH	SBO	DAR; 3	HCY	RCH	CSF	ATL; 1	MAR	NWS	**CLT**; 21	BRI	GPS	HBO											13th	13088	
1962	Fox Racing	39	Pontiac	CON	AWS	DAY	DAY	DAY; 6	CON	AWS	SVH	HBO	RCH	CLB																																																				10th	14404	
1962	Julian Petty	44	Pontiac												NWS; 33	GPS	MBS	MAR	BGS																																															10th	14404	
1962	Owens Racing	6	Pontiac																	BRI; 7	RCH	HCY	CON																									DAR; 4	HCY	RCH	DTS	AUG	MAR	NWS	CLT; 23											10th	14404	
1962	Fox Racing	3	Pontiac																					DAR; 7	PIF; 14	CLT; 7*	ATL; 7	BGS	AUG	RCH	SBO	DAY; 8	CLB	ASH	GPS	AUG	SVH	MBS	BRI; 37	CHT	NSV	HUN	AWS	STR	BGS	PIF	VAL																			10th	14404	
1962	Bud Moore Engineering	08	Pontiac																																																					ATL; 11										10th	14404	
1963	Owens Racing	6	Dodge	BIR	GGS	THS; 4	RSD; 33	DAY	DAY; 18	DAY; 48	PIF; 18	AWS; 18				BRI; 31	AUG	RCH; 14	GPS; 5	SBO; 8	BGS	MAR; 9	NWS; 6	CLB	THS	DAR; 12	ODS	RCH	CLT; 5	BIR; 13	ATL; 34	DAY; 6	MBS	SVH; 2	DTS	BGS; 11	**ASH**; 3	OBS	BRR; 4	BRI; 5	GPS; 6	NSV; 16	CLB; 2	AWS; 4	PIF; 16	BGS; 4	ONA	DAR; 14	**HCY**; 18	RCH; 15	MAR; 4		NWS; 8		CLT; 11	SBO; 2	HBO; 15	RSD; 13								8th	21156	
1963	Owens Racing	5	Dodge										HBO; 19																																							DTS; 3		THS; 14												8th	21156	
1963	Nichels Engineering	02	Pontiac											ATL; 26	HCY																																																			8th	21156	
1964	Owens Racing	5	Dodge	**CON**; 4			SVH; 12																																																											3rd	32146	
1964	Owens Racing	6	Dodge		AUG; 17	JSP; 16		RSD; 6	DAY; 3	DAY	DAY; 30	RCH; 1	BRI; 28	GPS; 1	BGS; 5	ATL; 21	AWS; 4	**HBO**; 1*	PIF; 3	**CLB**; 6	NWS; 11	MAR; 18	SVH; 7	DAR; 6	**LGY**; 12	HCY; 2*	SBO; 4	CLT; 8	GPS; 10*	ASH; 4	ATL; 23	CON; 2*	**NSV**; 2	CHT; 1*	**BIR**; 4	VAL; 8	**PIF**; 16*	DAY; 6	ODS; 2	OBS; 5*	BRR; 8	ISP; 14	GLN; 6	**LIN**; 1	BRI; 17	NSV; 3	**MBS**; 1*	AWS; 2	DTS; 2*	ONA; 17	CLB; 1	BGS; 4	STR; 4	DAR; 12	**HCY**; 1*	RCH; 2	**ODS**; 2	**HBO**; 14*	MAR; 8	SVH; 3	NWS; 17	CLT; 7	HAR; 15	AUG; 29	JAC; 10	3rd	32146	
1965	Owens Racing	6	Dodge	RSD	DAY	DAY	DAY	PIF	ASW	RCH	HBO	ATL	GPS	NWS	MAR	CLB	BRI	DAR	LGY	BGS	HCY	CLT	CCF	ASH	HAR	NSV	BIR	ATL	GPS	MBS	VAL	DAY	ODS	OBS	ISP	GLN	BRI; 36	NSV	**CCF**; 5*	AWS; 15	SMR; 9	PIF; 10*	AUG; 2	CLB; 1	DTS	BLV	BGS	DAR	HCY; 2	LIN; 3	ODS	RCH; 1	MAR; 3	NWS; 4	CLT	HBO; 6	CAR; 25	DTS								40th	5464	
1966	Owens Racing	6	Dodge	AUG; 6	**RSD**; 2	DAY	DAY; 6	DAY; 3	CAR; 8	**BRI**; 15*	ATL; 14	HCY; 1	CLB; 1*	GPS; 1*	**BGS**; 1*	NWS; 3	MAR; 9	DAR; 3	LGY; 19	MGR	MON	RCH; 1*	CLT; 17*	DTS; 1*	ASH; 1*	**PIF**; 16	SMR; 1*	AWS; 2	BLV; 27	**GPS**; 1*	DAY; 15	ODS	**BRR**; 1*	OXF; 7	FON; 1*	ISP; 4	BRI; 3	SMR; 2*	NSV	ATL; 44	CLB; 1	AWS; 13	BLV	BGS; 1*	DAR; 3	HCY; 1*	**RCH**; 1*	HBO; 2	MAR; 35	NWS; 2	CLT; 10	CAR; 7														1st	35638	
1967	Owens Racing	6	Dodge	AUG; 3	RSD; 8	DAY; 7	DAY	DAY; 24	AWS; 4	BRI; 1	GPS; 1*	BGS; 15	ATL; 21	CLB	HCY	NWS; 26	MAR	SVH	RCH																																															7th	26302	
1967	Holman-Moody	17	Ford																	**DAR**; 2	BLV	LGY	CLT; 2	ASH	MGR	SMR	BIR	CAR; 21	GPS	MGY	DAY; 4*	TRN	OXF	FDA	ISP	BRI; 28	SMR	NSV	ATL; 19	BGS	CLB	SVH	DAR; 2	HCY	RCH	BLV	HBO	MAR; 3	NWS; 34	CLT; 24	**CAR**; 2	AWS; 3														7th	26302	
1968	Holman-Moody	17	Ford	MGR; 11	MGY; 22	RSD; 2	DAY; 5	BRI; 1*	RCH; 1*	ATL; 31	**HCY**; 2	**GPS**; 14*	CLB; 7	**NWS**; 1*	**MAR**; 2	AUG	**AWS**; 1*	DAR; 1*	BLV; 1	LGY; 1*	CLT; 4	ASH; 21	**MGR**; 1*	**SMR**; 15	**BIR**; 18	CAR; 30	**GPS**; 2*	DAY; 3	ISP; 2	OXF; 2	**FDA**; 5	TRN; 2	BRI; 1*	SMR; 3	NSV; 1	ATL; 4	CLB; 1*	BGS; 1	AWS; 1*	SBO; 2	**LGY**; 1*	DAR; 2	HCY; 1	RCH; 2		HBO; 12	MAR; 6	NWS; 2	AUG; 1	CLT; 3*	CAR; 2	**JFC**; 3														1st	3499	
1968	Roy Trantham	84	Ford																																										BLV; 23																					1st	3499	
1969	Holman-Moody	17	Ford	**MGR**; 2	MGY	RSD; 3	DAY; 1	DAY	DAY; 6	**CAR**; 1*	AUG; 1	BRI; 3	**ATL**; 2	CLB; 2	HCY; 3	**GPS**; 3	**RCH**; 1*	NWS; 3	MAR; 2	AWS; 21	DAR; 5	BLV; 13	**LGY**; 1	CLT; 42	**MGR**; 2	**SMR**; 2	MCH; 2	KPT; 3	GPS; 2	NCF; 1*	DAY; 4	**DOV**; 23	**TPN**; 1*	TRN; 1	BLV; 2*	BRI; 1*	NSV; 6	**SMR**; 2	ATL; 2	**MCH**; 1*	SBO; 2	BGS; 3	AWS; 2	DAR; 2	HCY; 21	RCH; 4	TAL; Wth	CLB; 19	**MAR**; 2	NWS; 1	CLT; 5	SVH; 3	AUG; 3	CAR; 2	**JFC**; 2	MGR; 2*	TWS; 26									1st	4170	
1970	Holman-Moody	17	Ford	RSD; 17	DAY; 23	DAY	DAY; 2*	RCH	CAR	SVH	ATL	**BRI**; 18	TAL; 3	NWS	CLB	DAR; 1*	BLV	LGY	CLT; 14	SMR		MCH; 3	RSD	HCY	KPT	GPS	DAY; 8	AST	TPN	TRN	BRI; 22	SMR	NSV	ATL; 32	CLB	ONA	MCH; 37	TAL; 4	BGS	SBO	**DAR**; 4	HCY	RCH	DOV; 4	NCF	NWS	CLT; 39	MAR; 6	MGR	CAR; 2	LGY															23rd	1716	
1970	Junior Johnson	98	Ford																		MAR; 4																																													23rd	1716	
1971	Holman-Moody	17	Ford	RSD; 35	DAY							**BRI**; 1	ATL; 4	CLB	**GPS**; 2	SMR	NWS; 2	MAR; 2																																																51st	486	
1971	Holman-Moody	17	Mercury			DAY; 1	DAY; 4	ONT	RCH	CAR									DAR; 31	SBO																																														51st	486	
1971	Giachetti Brothers	44	Ford								HCY; 2																																																							51st	486	
1971	Nichels Engineering	33	Pontiac																		TAL; 43	ASH	KPT	CLT; 34	DOV	MCH; 33	RSD	HOU	GPS																																					51st	486	
1971	Nichels Engineering	17	Plymouth																											DAY; 8	BRI	AST	ISP	TRN	NSV	ATL	BGS	ONA	MCH																											51st	486	
1971	Nichels Engineering	17	Pontiac																																					TAL; DNQ	CLB	HCY	DAR; 35	MAR	CLT	DOV					TWS; 48															51st	486	
1971	Nichels Engineering	99	Pontiac																																												CAR; 36	MGR	RCH	NWS																51st	486	

==== Winston Cup Series ====
NASCAR Winston Cup Series results
Year	Team	No.	Make	1	2	3	4	5	6	7	8	9	10	11	12	13	14	15	16	17	18	19	20	21	22	23	24	25	26	27	28	29	30	31	NWCC	Pts	Ref
1972	Bud Moore Engineering	15	Ford	RSD; 26	DAY	RCH	ONT	CAR	ATL; 4	BRI																									20th	4718	
1972	Wood Brothers Racing	21	Mercury								**DAR**; 1*	NWS		TAL; 1*	CLT; 25	DOV	MCH; 1*	RSD	TWS	DAY; 1*	BRI	TRN	**ATL**; 3*	TAL; 26	MCH; 1*	NSV	DAR; 2		DOV; 1*	MAR; 3	NWS	**CLT**; 3	**CAR**; 4	TWS	20th	4718	
1972	Wood Brothers Racing	21	Ford										MAR; 8																						20th	4718	
1972	Donlavey Racing	90	Ford																									RCH; 24							20th	4718	
1973	Wood Brothers Racing	21	Mercury	**RSD**; 22	DAY; 33	RCH	**CAR**; 1*	BRI	ATL; 1*	NWS	**DAR**; 1*	**MAR**; 1	TAL; 1*	NSV	CLT; 2	**DOV**; 1*	TWS	RSD	MCH; 1	DAY; 1*	BRI	ATL; 1*	TAL; 3*	NSV	**DAR**; 2	RCH	**DOV**; 1*	NWS	MAR; 31	**CLT**; 36	CAR; 1*				13th	5382.8	
1974	Wood Brothers Racing	21	Mercury	**RSD**; 3	**DAY**; 35	RCH	CAR; 34	BRI	**ATL**; 2*	DAR; 1*	NWS	MAR	**TAL**; 1*	NSV	**DOV**; 2	**CLT**; 1*	RSD	**MCH**; 3	**DAY**; 1	BRI	NSV	ATL; 2*	POC; 4	**TAL**; 2	**MCH**; 1*	DAR; 25	RCH	DOV; 30	NWS	MAR	**CLT**; 1*	CAR; 1	ONT; 2		3rd	2389.25	
1975	Wood Brothers Racing	21	Mercury	RSD; 2	DAY; 4*	RCH	CAR; 2	BRI	ATL; 3	NWS	**DAR**; 7*	MAR; 20	TAL; 2	NSV	**DOV**; 1*	**CLT**; 3	RSD	MCH; 1*	DAY; 20	NSV	POC; 1*	TAL; 39	**MCH**; 2	**DAR**; 27	DOV; 26	NWS	MAR; 23	**CLT**; 2	RCH	CAR; 25	BRI	ATL; 4	**ONT**; 2		14th	3057	
1976	Wood Brothers Racing	21	Mercury	RSD; 1*	DAY; 1	CAR; 29	RCH	BRI	ATL; 1	NWS	**DAR**; 1	MAR; 3	TAL; 37	NSV	DOV; 2	**CLT**; 1*	**RSD**; 1	MCH; 1	DAY; 2	NSV	POC; 4*	TAL; 28	**MCH**; 1	BRI	**DAR**; 1*	RCH	DOV; 3	MAR; 19	NWS	**CLT**; 6	**CAR**; 6	ATL; 2	**ONT**; 1*		9th	3483	
1977	Wood Brothers Racing	21	Mercury	RSD; 1	DAY; 21	RCH	CAR; 32	ATL; 2	NWS	**DAR**; 4*	BRI	MAR; 5	TAL; 22	NSV	DOV; 2*	**CLT**; 2	RSD; 2	**MCH**; 4	DAY; 5	NSV	POC; 28	TAL; 37	**MCH**; 2	BRI	DAR; 1	RCH	DOV; 2	MAR; 3	NWS	**CLT**; 3	CAR; 27	ATL; 2	ONT; 5		13th	3227	
1978	Wood Brothers Racing	21	Mercury	**RSD**; 3	DAY; 34	RCH	CAR; 1*	ATL; 21	BRI	DAR; 29	NWS	MAR; 21	TAL; 35	DOV; 1	**CLT**; 5	NSV	**RSD**; 27	**MCH**; 2	DAY; 1*	NSV	POC; 2	TAL; 5	**MCH**; 1	BRI	**DAR**; 28	RCH	DOV; 4	MAR; 25	NWS	**CLT**; 5	CAR; 24	ATL; 32	ONT; 38		16th	2756	
1979	Wood Brothers Racing	21	Mercury	**RSD**; 2	DAY; 37	CAR; 23	RCH	ATL; 18	NWS	BRI	DAR; 22	MAR	TAL	NSV	DOV	CLT	TWS	RSD	MCH	DAY	NSV	POC													32nd	1203	
1979	Osterlund Racing	2	Olds																				TAL; 2												32nd	1203	
1979	Osterlund Racing	2	Chevy																					**MCH**; 4	BRI; 7	DAR; 1	RCH	DOV	MAR	CLT	NWS	CAR	ATL	ONT	32nd	1203	
1980	Ellington Racing	1	Chevy	RSD	DAY	RCH	CAR	ATL	BRI	DAR; 1*	NWS	MAR				CLT; 6	TWS	RSD	MCH; 25							DAR; 2	RCH	DOV	NWS	MAR	CLT; 38	CAR			37th	1004	
1980	Ellington Racing	1	Olds										**TAL**; 3	NSV	DOV					DAY; 2	NSV	POC	TAL; 17	MCH	BRI								ATL; 31	ONT	37th	1004	
1981	Halpern Enterprises	16	Chevy	RSD	DAY; 29	RCH	CAR; 30	ATL; 32	BRI	NWS	DAR; 8	MAR	TAL	NSV																					70th	-	
1981	Kennie Childers Racing	12	Olds												**DOV**; 25	CLT	TWS	RSD	MCH	DAY	NSV	POC	TAL	MCH	BRI										70th	-	
1981	Ellington Racing	01	Buick																							DAR; 8	RCH	DOV	MAR	NWS	CLT	CAR	ATL	RSD	70th	-	
1982	Bobby Hawkins Racing	03	Buick	DAY	RCH	BRI	ATL	CAR	DAR	NWS	MAR	TAL	NSV	DOV	**CLT**; 21	POC	RSD	MCH; 36	DAY; 5	NSV	POC	TAL	MCH; 31	BRI	**DAR**; 37	RCH	DOV	NWS	CLT; 3	MAR	CAR	ATL	RSD		37th	613	
1983	Bobby Hawkins Racing	16	Chevy	DAY; 8	RCH	CAR	ATL	DAR; 22	NWS	MAR	TAL; 31	NSV	DOV	BRI	CLT; 39	RSD	POC	MCH; 35	DAY; 3	NSV	POC	TAL; 25	MCH; 9	BRI	DAR; 10	RCH	DOV	MAR	NWS	CLT; 39	CAR	ATL	RSD		33rd	943	
1984	Bobby Hawkins Racing	16	Chevy	DAY; 9	RCH; 32	CAR	ATL	BRI	NWS	DAR; 37	MAR	TAL; 32	NSV	DOV	CLT; 9	RSD		MCH; 9	DAY; 17	NSV	POC	TAL	MCH; 39	BRI	DAR; 41	RCH	DOV	MAR	CLT; 38	NWS	CAR	ATL; 25	RSD		41st	812	
1984	Junior Johnson & Associates	12	Chevy														**POC**; QL^{†}																		41st	812	
1985	Ellington Racing	21	Chevy	DAY; 28	RCH	CAR	ATL; 29	BRI	DAR; 28	NWS	MAR	TAL; 36	DOV	CLT; 27	RSD	POC	MCH; 17	DAY; 10	POC; 35																36th	879	
1985	Pearson Racing	21	Ford																	TAL; 35	MCH; 39	BRI	DAR; 40	RCH	DOV	MAR	NWS	CLT; 37	CAR	ATL	RSD				36th	879	
1986	Pearson Racing	21	Chevy	DAY	RCH	CAR	ATL	BRI	DAR	NWS	MAR	TAL	DOV	CLT; 36	RSD	POC	MCH	DAY	POC	TAL	GLN	MCH; 10	BRI	DAR	RCH	DOV	MAR	NWS	CLT	CAR	ATL	RSD			82nd	134	
^{†} – Qualified for Neil Bonnett

===== Daytona 500 =====
Year	Team	Manufacturer	Start	Finish
1960	Pearson Racing	Chevrolet	33	28
1961	Tony Lavati	Pontiac	30	21
1962	Fox Racing	Pontiac	2	6
1963	Owens Racing	Dodge	50	48
1964	Owens Racing	Dodge	7	30
1966	Owens Racing	Dodge	12	3
1967	Owens Racing	Dodge	15	24
1968	Holman-Moody	Ford	4	5
1969	Holman-Moody	Ford	3	6
1970	Holman-Moody	Ford	31	2
1971	Holman-Moody	Mercury	4	4
1973	Wood Brothers Racing	Mercury	20	33
1974	Wood Brothers Racing	Mercury	**1**	35
1975	Wood Brothers Racing	Mercury	2	4
1976	Wood Brothers Racing	Mercury	7	**1**
1977	Wood Brothers Racing	Mercury	5	21
1978	Wood Brothers Racing	Mercury	5	34
1979	Wood Brothers Racing	Mercury	9	37
1981	Halpern Enterprises	Chevrolet	9	29
1983	Bobby Hawkins Racing	Chevrolet	15	8
1984	Bobby Hawkins Racing	Chevrolet	11	9
1985	Ellington Racing	Chevrolet	4	28

==== Budweiser Late Model Sportsman Series ====
NASCAR Budweiser Late Model Sportsman Series results
Year	Team	No.	Make	1	2	3	4	5	6	7	8	9	10	11	12	13	14	15	16	17	18	19	20	21	22	23	24	25	26	27	28	29	30	31	32	33	34	35	NBLMSSC	Pts	Ref
1982	Pearson Racing	21	Pontiac	DAY	RCH	**BRI**; 2*	MAR	DAR; 3	HCY	SBO	CRW	RCH	LGY	DOV; 5	HCY	CLT	ASH	HCY	SBO	**CAR**; 1	CRW	SBO	HCY	LGY	IRP; 19	BRI	HCY	RCH	MAR	CLT	HCY	MAR							35th	776	
1983	Pearson Racing	21	Ford	DAY	RCH	CAR	HCY	MAR	NWS	SBO	GPS	LGY	**DOV**; 12	BRI	CLT	SBO	HCY	ROU	SBO	ROU	CRW	ROU	SBO	HCY	LGY	IRP	GPS	BRI	HCY	DAR	RCH	NWS	SBO	MAR	ROU	CLT	HCY	MAR	112th	127	

=== International Race of Champions ===
(key) (Bold – Pole position. * – Most laps led.)

International Race of Champions results
Season	Make	Q1	Q2	Q3	1	2	3	4	Pos.	Pts	Ref
1973–74	Porsche				RSD; 9	RSD; 2	RSD; 4	DAY; 4	4th	$14,600	
1974–75	Chevy				MCH; 3	RSD; 4	RSD; 11	DAY; 5	6th	$16,500	
1975–76	Chevy				MCH; 1	RSD; 10	RSD; 8	DAY; 4	5th	$21,000	
1976–77	Chevy				MCH; 10	RSD; 2	RSD; 11	DAY; 6	9th	$10,500	
1978–79	Chevy	MCH; 5	MCH	RSD	RSD	ATL			NA	-	

Sporting positions
Preceded by Ned Jarrett; Richard Petty	NASCAR Grand National Champion; 1966; 1968, 1969	Succeeded by Richard Petty; Bobby Isaac
Preceded by Benny Parsons	Daytona 500 Winner; 1976	Succeeded by Cale Yarborough
