= 1967 Greenville 200 =

American NASCAR auto race in 1967

Race details
- Race 8 of 49 in the 1967 NASCAR Grand National Series season
- Date: March 25, 1967
- Official name: Greenville 200
- Location: Greenville-Pickens Speedway (Greenville, South Carolina)
- Course: Dirt oval
- Course length: 0.500 miles (0.805 km)
- Distance: 200 laps, 100.000 mi (160.934 km)
- Weather: Mild with temperatures of 75 °F (24 °C); wind speeds of 10.1 miles per hour (16.3 km/h)
- Average speed: 61.824 miles per hour (99.496 km/h)
- Attendance: 8,300

Pole position
| Driver | Dick Hutcherson | Bondy Long |

Most laps led
| Driver | David Pearson | Cotton Owens |
- Laps: 198

Winner
| No. 6 | David Pearson | Cotton Owens |

The 1967 Greenville 200 was a NASCAR Grand National Series event that was held on March 25, 1967, at Greenville-Pickens Speedway in Greenville, South Carolina.

The transition to purpose-built racecars began in the early 1960s and occurred gradually over that decade. Changes made to the sport by the late 1960s brought an end to the "strictly stock" vehicles of the 1950s.

== Race report ==
Two hundred laps were done on a dirt oval track spanning 0.5 miles (0.80 km) for 100 miles (160 km) of racing action. Notable crew chiefs to participate in this race include Dale Inman and Bill Ellis.

This was the eighth race in the year out of the 49 raced during the 1967 NASCAR Cup Series season. It took one hour and thirty-seven minutes to resolve two hundred laps of racing. As a result, David Pearson managed to defeat Jim Paschal by three laps. Dick Hutcherson earned the pole position with a speed of 70.313 miles per hour (113.158 km/h). Eight thousand and three hundred fans would watch this race with notable drivers like Richard Petty (finished 19th), Wendell Scott (who finished 10th), and Elmo Langley (who finished 6th). Larry Hess was the last-place finishing driver due to an engine issue on lap 5. Running out of gas and crashes were the main issues of this race.

Bill Vanderhoff would make his NASCAR Grand National Series debut in this race.

=== Qualifying ===
| Grid | No. | Driver | Manufacturer | Owner |
|---|---|---|---|---|
| 1 | 29 | Dick Hutcherson | '67 Ford | Bondy Long |
| 2 | 6 | David Pearson | '66 Dodge | Cotton Owens |
| 3 | 64 | Elmo Langley | '66 Ford | Elmo Langley / Henry Woodfield |
| 4 | 4 | John Sears | '66 Ford | L.G. DeWitt |
| 5 | 14 | Jim Paschal | '65 Plymouth | Tom Friedkin |
| 6 | 43 | Richard Petty | '67 Plymouth | Petty Enterprises |
| 7 | 47 | Buddy Baker | '66 Chevrolet | Toy Bolton |
| 8 | 2 | Bobby Allison | '65 Chevrolet | Donald Brackins |
| 9 | 48 | James Hylton | '65 Dodge | Bud Hartje |
| 10 | 10 | Dick Johnson | '65 Ford | Bill Champion |

== Timeline ==
Section reference:

- Start of race: David Pearson started the race with the pole position.
- Lap 5: Larry Hess' engine stopped working properly, making him the last-place driver.
- Lap 59: The rear end of Bobby Allison's vehicle became problematic, ending his day on the track.
- Lap 65: Bill Ervin had a terminal crash, forcing him to withdraw from the race.
- Lap 75: Richard Petty takes over the lead from David Pearson.
- Lap 77: David Pearson takes over the lead from Richard Petty.
- Lap 95: Richard Petty had a terminal crash, forcing him to withdraw from the race.
- Lap 114: Bill Vanderhoff ran out of gas, ending his day on the track.
- Lap 186: Dick Hutcherson's steering wheel stopped working properly, forcing him out of the race.
- Lap 197: Jim Paschal ran out of gas, making him finish in second place.
- Finish: David Pearson was officially declared the winner of the event.

== Finishing order ==
1. David Pearson (No. 6)
2. Jim Paschal* (No. 14)
3. John Sears (No. 4)
4. Buddy Baker (No. 47)
5. James Hylton (No. 48)
6. Elmo Langley (No. 64)
7. Dick Hutcherson* (No. 29)
8. Neil Castles (No. 09)
9. Curly Mills (No. 76)
10. Wendell Scott (No. 34)
11. Clyde Lynn (No. 20)
12. Dick Johnson (No. 10)
13. Henley Gray (No. 97)
14. Bill Seifert (No. 45)
15. Earl Brooks (No. 75)
16. Larry Miller (No. 32)
17. George Poulous (No. 58)
18. Bill Vanderhoff* (No. 00)
19. Richard Petty* (No. 43)
20. Bill Irvin* (No. 31)
21. Bobby Allison* (No. 2)
22. Harold Stockton* (No. 35)
23. Larry Hess* (No. 44)

* Driver failed to finish race

| Preceded by 1967 Southeastern 500 | NASCAR Grand National Series Season; 1967 | Succeeded by 1967 untitled race at Bowman-Gray Stadium |
