= 1965 Daytona 500 =

Auto race run in Florida in 1965

Race details
- Race 4 of 55 in the 1965 NASCAR Grand National Series season
- 1965 Daytona 500 program cover
- Date: February 14, 1965
- Location: Daytona International Speedway; Daytona Beach, Florida, U.S.
- Course: Permanent racing facility
- Course length: 2.5 miles (4.02 km)
- Distance: 133 laps, 332.5 mi (535.106 km)
- Scheduled distance: 200 laps, 500 mi (804.672 km)
- Weather: Temperatures hovering around 66 °F (19 °C); wind speeds up to 17.2 miles per hour (27.7 km/h)
- Average speed: 141.539 miles per hour (227.785 km/h)

Pole position
Driver	Darel Dieringer	Bud Moore Engineering
- Time: 171.151 miles per hour (275.441 km/h)

Most laps led
Driver	Marvin Panch	Wood Brothers Racing
- Laps: 80

Winner
No. 28	Fred Lorenzen	Holman-Moody

The 1965 Daytona 500, the 7th running of the event, was held on February 14, 1965, at Daytona International Speedway in Daytona Beach, Florida. Fred Lorenzen, driving a 1965 Ford, won the race from fourth position in a two-hour-and-23-minute time span by Darel Dieringer by a full lap. There were 3 cautions flags which slowed the race for 43 laps. The race ended on lap 133 due to persistent rain. This was Lorenzen's first victory of the season.

== Safety innovations ==
NASCAR instituted new rules in October 1964 to enhance safety and decrease speeds for 1965 after the previous year's deaths of Joe Weatherly and Fireball Roberts. The Chrysler Hemi engine was dominated that year by 1964 NASCAR Champion Richard Petty.

Ford Motor Company wanted a new engine with high-rise cylinder heads to compete with the Hemi and threatened to pull out if Bill France Sr. didn't allow it. NASCAR's new rules, however, banned both Hemi engines and high-rise cylinder heads.

== Speedweeks ==
Darel Dieringer won the pole with a speed of 171.151 mph (275.441 km/h) in Bud Moore's 1964 Mercury, then held off Ned Jarrett's move in the final turn to win the first 100-mile (160 km) qualifying race. the second race became a duel between Fred Lorenzen and Junior Johnson. Lorenzen took the lead on lap 39. But when he roared under the white flag, he mistook it for the checkered flag. Lorenzen let off and Johnson passed him on the last lap to win. The second qualifying race featured a wild first lap crash as Rod Eulenfeld triggered a wild crash that also took out 12 other cars in the race. Eulenfeld walked away from that crash.

== Race Day ==
On Race day, Junior Johnson grabbed the lead on the first lap from his second starting spot and led the first 27 laps. at that car 14 cars were out all because of mechanical problems. Johnson was racing in his usual go-for-broke style when a tire blew. Johnson's car hurled into the outside wall and spread debris over a wide area. Johnson suffered only a cut over his eye. After Johnson's abrupt departure, 1961 winner Marvin Panch led through lap 68 in the Wood Brothers Ford, with Lorenzen and Bobby Johns on his tail. Lorenzen led laps 69 through 78 before giving way to Panch.

At halfway, Panch was still in control, but clouds were darkening over the track. On lap 119, Lorenzen edged past Panch and took the lead for only the second time. Rain was falling by Lap 129. As the yellow light came on, Panch made a run on Lorenzen coming off turn two. Panch went to the outside, Lorenzen moved up, the cars touched and Panch spun down the backstretch, ending his chances for a second 500 victory.

Lorenzen remained in the lead, but the fender that had hit Panch's car was bent in on his tire. "Stay out", ordered the crew chief, who was counting on the weather to shorten the race. Soon, it was pouring. The race was stopped after 133 laps and declared official. The "Golden Boy" had won NASCAR's biggest race.

== Results ==
Pos	Grid	Car No.	Driver	Team	Manufacturer	Laps	Laps Led	Time/Retired
1	4	28	Fred Lorenzen	Holman-Moody	Ford	133	25	2:22:56
2	1	16	Darel Dieringer	Bud Moore Engineering	Mercury	132	0	+1 Lap
3	5	7	Bobby Johns	Holman-Moody	Ford	132	1	+1 Lap
4	16	15	Earl Balmer	Bud Moore Engineering	Mercury	132	0	+1 Lap
5	3	11	Ned Jarrett	Bondy Long	Ford	132	0	+1 Lap
6	6	21	Marvin Panch	Wood Brothers Racing	Ford	132	80	+1 Lap
7	26	29	Dick Hutcherson	Holman-Moody	Ford	130	0	+3 Laps
8	10	24	Sam McQuagg	Betty Lilly	Ford	130	0	+3 Laps
9	32	10	Cale Yarborough	Gary Weaver	Ford	128	0	+5 Laps
10	36	49	G. C. Spencer	G. C. Spencer	Ford	128	0	+5 Laps
11	13	12	Bobby Allison	Bobby Allison Motorsports	Ford	128	0	+5 Laps
12	9	04	H. B. Bailey	H. B. Bailey	Pontiac	126	0	+7 Laps
13	15	60	Doug Cooper	Bob Cooper	Ford	125	0	+8 Laps
14	19	19	J. T. Putney	Herman Beam	Chevrolet	125	0	+8 Laps
15	8	74	Donald Tucker	Don Snyder	Ford	124	0	+9 Laps
16	17	72	Jerry Grant	Tom Friedkin	Ford	123	0	+10 Laps
17	27	86	Neil Castles	Buck Baker	Plymouth	122	0	+11 Laps
18	12	68	Bob Derrington	Bob Derrington	Ford	121	0	+12 Laps
19	21	44	Larry Hess	Larry Hess	Ford	119	0	+14 Laps
20	14	34	Wendell Scott	Wendell Scott	Ford	118	0	+15 Laps
21	31	64	Elmo Langley	Elmo Langley	Ford	118	0	+15 Laps
22	33	81	Don Tilley	Joe Keistler	Dodge	117	0	+16 Laps
23	28	14	Johnny Allen	Sam Fletcher	Plymouth	114	0	+19 Laps
24	41	99	Herb Shannon	–	Mercury	110	0	Engine
25	30	37	Bub Strickler	Bub Strickler	Ford	73	0	Engine
26	20	03	Reb Wickersham	Ray Underwood	Ford	68	0	+55 Laps
27	11	82	Bunkie Blackburn	Casper Hensley	Pontiac	49	0	Crankshaft
28	2	27	Junior Johnson	Junior Johnson & Associates	Ford	27	27	Accident
29	24	55	Tiny Lund	Lyle Stelter	Ford	12	0	Rocker arm
30	22	02	Roy Mayne	Bob Cooper	Pontiac	6	0	Distributor
31	23	20	Jack Anderson	Ron Cory	Ford	5	0	Transmission
32	29	2	Jim Bray	Shorty Johns	Pontiac	4	0	Overheating
33	43	35	Jeff Hawkins	Lester Hunter	Dodge	4	0	Handling
34	34	18	Ned Setzer	Toy Bolton	Chevrolet	3	0	Fuel pump
35	35	61	Barry Brooks	Bob Cooper	Pontiac	3	0	Oil pressure
36	42	26	Red Farmer	–	Ford	3	0	Handling
37	37	53	Pete Stewart	David Warren	Ford	2	0	Handling
38	39	98	Jimmy Helms	–	Ford	2	0	Clutch
39	40	08	Tom Pistone	Glen Sweet	Ford	2	0	Clutch
40	18	88	Buddy Baker	Buck Baker	Dodge	2	0	Engine
41	7	76	Larry Frank	Larry Frank	Ford	1	0	Oil pressure
42	38	79	Joe Penland	Harold Rhodes	Chevrolet	1	0	Piston
43	25	39	Robert Vaughn	Ronald Smith	Pontiac	1	0	Oil pressure
