= International 500 =

Snowmobile race

The International 500 Snowmobile Race, commonly known in Michigan as "the I-500", takes place annually in Sault Ste. Marie, Michigan. It is known across the country, and is also known to be the largest, longest single-day snowmobile race in the world.

== Origin ==
The idea for the I-500 came about in 1968. Several businessmen were discussing the Indianapolis 500, and the question rose of whether or not a snowmobile could run for 500 miles (800 km). The idea became a plan for a race patterned off the Indianapolis 500 for snowmobiles.

A section of land was acquired from the city of Sault Ste. Marie on which to build the track. The site was originally an ammunitions dump for Fort Brady during World War II. It posed a problem for the newly created I-500 Committee, because three concrete ammunitions bunkers were still on the property. The help of the National Guard was enlisted, and two of the bunkers were destroyed (the third remains to this day). In less than six months, a crew composed entirely of volunteers had completed the one-mile-long (1.6 km) track.

== First race ==
On February 8, 1969, the first I-500 was held with 47 qualifying drivers. At the time, there was no standard of rules for snowmobile races of this type, so the I-500 Committee adapted the rules of the Indianapolis 500. Volunteers counted the laps, as they would do for the next 28 years. Each rider was required to have at least three backup drivers, and they had to change places every 50 laps or less. The total prize money allotted for all places was $10,000. After 13 hours and 42 minutes of racing, Dan Planck won the first I-500 on a Ski-Doo. By the time Planck crossed the finish line, only 26 snowmobiles were still running. By the following year, news of the race had spread, and professional drivers began attending the I-500. It has since become one of the most important snowmobile racing events for manufacturers to showcase their machine's performance and durability.

== The race today ==
In the modern I-500, the race takes approximately eight hours to complete. The original time trial attempt limit (two per driver) has been abandoned. An entrant may attempt to qualify in the time trial as many times as he chooses. Since 1999 the laps have been counted by an electronic timing system. A wire is run under the racing surface at the start finish line and each of the snowmobiles has a transponder that triggers the wire's receiver and the racer's lap is counted. Drivers can now complete the race alone, although most teams choose to have two or more drivers, with a maximum of three. John Wicht III is the only driver to have reached and won, riding all 500 miles on his own, a feat he accomplished four times.

Each driver must provide a racing resume along with other requirements before being allowed to enter. Many drivers spend the time preceding the I-500 competing in similar but shorter distance races around the Midwest to prepare for the big race. Each racing team spends thousands of dollars for equipment and fuel. Top drivers may be factory supported in their efforts by some of the manufacturers i.e.; Ski-Doo, Yamaha, Polaris and Arctic Cat. Through the years the I-500 has gained a large following with a record crowds of near 20,000 people in the early 1970s. Snowmobiling as a sport and snowmobile racing reached a peak in the mid to late 1970s and the big race in the Upper Peninsula of Michigan was the place to be for those in the sport. Throughout the 1980s and 1990s sales of the four main manufacturers (Ski-Doo, Yamaha, Polaris, Arctic-Cat) continued, with most reaching their all time sales high in the mid-1990s. As sales grew so did the manufacturer's interest in finishing well at the I-500, and so the prize money they offered also increased to an all-time high. More recently the event draws between 8,000 and 10,000 people each year. The total purse (prize money) is now generally in excess of $40,000. The original track was made of snow, but now three 8,000-US-gallon (30,000 L) tankers deposit approximately 1,800,000 US gallons (6,800,000 L) of water on the track over the course of three weeks to create a layer of ice twelve to eighteen inches thick.

== In the news ==
In 2004, a non-driver was killed during the I-500 for the first time. Alynn Burke, the girlfriend and guest of a pit crew member, was standing close to the track in a crew-only area with another pit crew member. A competing snowmobile broke, the driver was thrown off and the machine hit the snowbank, becoming airborne. The unmanned airborne machine hit a lightpole and then hit Burke, fatally injuring her. The mother of one of the drivers was also in the crew-only area and suffered a broken ankle, and a crew member suffered leg and internal injuries. Those three, in addition to another driver that had been previously injured on the track, forced Sault Ste. Marie's hospital, War Memorial, to activate its disaster drill. The hospital informed the race officials that its emergency room had or would soon reach capacity as ambulances had been previously dispatched to an unrelated automobile accident. The race was shut down at the 174th lap, and the leader at the time was declared the winner. The death sparked a controversy about the safety of the race; many people condemned the I-500 Committee for allowing the disaster to happen. In previous years there had been no fencing or barrier of any type on the inside of the back stretch where the crew and the crew's guests were allowed to stand. Since the incident that caused Burke's death, a snow barrier 10 feet (3.0 m) high and 20 feet (6.1 m) from the track's surface has been built each year. Now only two members of each team are allowed to stand atop this barrier and monitor their machine. Every year the race committee, race officials, and team members strive to make the race as safe and as competitive as possible.

In 2012 the financial gains the community of Sault Sainte Marie received during race week was estimated at $3.5 million.

== Race winners ==
- 1969 Dan Planck, Otis Cowles, Leonard Cowles, Ski-Doo
- 1970 Don Brown, Bill Gunsell, Steve Holcomb, Chaparral
- 1971 Mike Nickerson, Gerald Teegarden, Larry Holmes, Ski-Doo
- 1972 LuVerne Hagen, Stan Hayes, Doug Hayes, Polaris
- 1973 Melvin Kitchen, Dan Prevo, Douglas Bisball, Polaris
- 1974 LeRoy Lindblad, Wes Pesek, Burt Bassett, Polaris
- 1975 Buddy Weber, Stanley Shunk, Jim Crawford, Yamaha
- 1976 Stan Hayes, Doug Hayes, Jerry Witt, Mercury
- 1977 Grant Hawkins, Mike Chisholm, Yamaha
- 1978 Ken Littleton, Ted Ritchie Yamaha
- 1979 Robert Dohm Jr, Ron Dohm, Jeff Dohm Polaris
- 1980 Grant Hawkins, Ed Goldsmith Yamaha
- 1981 Guy Useldinger, Dan Enns Polaris
- 1982 Gerard Karpik, Brian Musselman, Ski-Doo
- 1983 Duane Baur, Ralph Swartzendruber, Paul Swartzendruber, Yamaha
- 1984 Brian Musselman, Karl Schwartz, Ski-Doo
- 1985 Brian Musselman, Chris Daly, Ski-Doo
- 1986 Jeff Kipfmiller, Rick Zudell, Dan Kirts Ski-Doo
- 1987 Mike Staszak, Jeff Kipfmiller, Ski-Doo
- 1988 John Wicht III, Polaris
- 1989 George Sherrard, Tom Sibbald, Jeff Kipfmiller, Ski-Doo
- 1990 Rick Wezenski, Gary Loar, Troy Donn, Polaris
- 1991 Todd Krikke, Randy Krikke, Polaris
- 1992 John Wicht III, Polaris
- 1993 John Wicht III, Polaris
- 1994 Ivan Hansen, Robb Sass, Polaris
- 1995 John Wicht III, Polaris
- 1996 Troy Pierce, Todd Krikke, Polaris
- 1997 Troy Pierce, Todd Krikke, Polaris
- 1998 Corey Davidson, Steve Olson, Polaris
- 1999 Corey Davidson, Steve Olson, Polaris
- 2000 Corey Davidson, Steve Olson, Polaris
- 2001 Russ Chartrand, Tim Leeck, Polaris
- 2002 Mike Gentz Jr., Gabe Bunke, Polaris
- 2003 Corey Davidson, Travis Hjelle, Polaris
- 2004 John Hoos, Matt Hoos, Corey Furkey, Chris Furkey, Polaris
- 2005 Gabe Bunke, Josh Davis, Corey Davidson, Polaris
- 2006 Corey Davidson, Travis Hjelle, Yamaha
- 2007 Chad Gueco, Bill Wilkes, Yamaha
- 2008 Corey Davidson, Jim Wilson, Yamaha
- 2009 Troy Dewald, Jeff Luenberger, Bryan Dyrdahl, Ski-Doo
- 2010 Troy Dewald, Jeff Luenberger, Arctic-Cat
- 2011 Corey Davidson, Travis Hjelle, Polaris
- 2012 Gabe Bunke, Aaron Christensen, Polaris
- 2013 Gabe Bunke, Aaron Christensen, Polaris
- 2014 Gabe Bunke, Aaron Christensen, Polaris
- 2015 Brian Dick, Wes Selby, Arctic Cat
- 2016 Gabe Bunke, Aaron Christensen, Taylor Bunke, Polaris
- 2017 Gabe Bunke, Aaron Christensen, Taylor Bunke, Polaris
- 2018 Zach Herfindahl, Wesley Selby, Arctic Cat
- 2019 Troy DeWald, Ryan Spencer, Bill Wilkes, Arctic Cat
- 2020 Gabe Bunke, Aaron Christensen, Taylor Bunke, Polaris
- 2021 No race due to the COVID-19 pandemic
- 2022 Justin Tate, Andy Wenzlaff, Polaris
- 2023 Tyler Nickles, Cody Bauer, Joey Burch, Nick Wickerham, Polaris
- 2024 Aaron Christensen, Taylor Bunke, Boe Bunke, Polaris
