= Larry Hess =

American racecar driver (1935–2020)

- Born: May 3, 1935; Venango County, Pennsylvania, U.S.
- Died: June 24, 2020 (aged 85); Salisbury, North Carolina, U.S.

NASCAR Cup Series career
- 27 races run over 5 years
- Best finish: 16th – 1965 NASCAR Grand National Series season
- First race: 1965 Daytona 500 (Daytona International Speedway)
- Last race: 1969 World 600 (Charlotte Motor Speedway)
Wins	Top tens	Poles
0	3	0

Larry W. Hess (May 3, 1935 – June 24, 2020) was an American NASCAR Winston Cup Series driver whose career spanned from 1965 to 1969. His choice of vehicles ranged from a Ford to a Rambler and even the occasional Dodge vehicle.

== Career ==
From the age of 30 to the age of 34, Hess competed in 27 different NASCAR events for a distance of 5,967.7 miles (9,604.1 km). He managed to complete 4357 laps - earning $17,134 in the process ($150,427.81 when adjusted for inflation). After starting an average of 27th place and finishing an average of 21st place, Hess managed to pick up three "top-ten" finishes in 1965 (Atlanta 500, World 600, and the Firecracker 400). Hess' worst seasons were in 1967 and 1968 where he finished 109th in the overall standings.

Hess drove for himself as an owner-driver for 25 races while doing a single race (1965 Tidewater 300) for NASCAR owner Jim Tatum. His earnings as an owner were $14,245 after achieving three finishes in the "top-ten" ($131,885.53 when adjusted for inflation). Cars under Hess' ownership started at an average of 25th place and finished an average of 20th place - achieving better results than his personal driving career.

== Death ==
Hess died in Salisbury, North Carolina on June 24, 2020, at the age of 85.
