= 1965 Fireball 200 =

Auto race held at Asheville-Weaverville Speedway in 1965

Race details
- Race 6 of 55 in the 1965 NASCAR Grand National Series season
- Date: February 28, 1965; 61 years ago
- Official name: Fireball 200
- Location: Asheville-Weaverville Speedway, Weaverville, North Carolina
- Course: Permanent racing facility
- Course length: 0.500 miles (0.804 km)
- Distance: 200 laps, 100 mi (151 km)
- Weather: Chilly with temperatures of 64.9 °F (18.3 °C); wind speeds of 8.9 miles per hour (14.3 km/h)
- Average speed: 75.678 miles per hour (121.792 km/h)

Pole position
Driver	Ned Jarrett	Bondy Long

Most laps led
Driver	Ned Jarrett	Bondy Long
- Laps: 199

Winner
No. 11	Ned Jarrett	Bondy Long

Television in the United States
- Network: untelevised
- Announcers: none

The 1965 Fireball 200 was a NASCAR Grand National Series event that was held on February 28, 1965, at Asheville-Weaverville Speedway in Weaverville, North Carolina. The name of the race was likely a homage to the late Fireball Roberts who died the year before in Charlotte.

The transition to purpose-built racecars began in the early 1960s and occurred gradually over that decade. Changes made to the sport by the late 1960s brought an end to the "strictly stock" vehicles of the 1950s.

== Race report ==
Two hundred laps took place on a paved oval track spanning 0.500 miles (0.805 km) for a grand total of 100.0 miles (160.9 km). It took an hour and nineteen minutes for the race to reach its conclusion; Ned Jarrett defeated Dick Hutcherson by an unknown length of time in front of 6500 people. Notable speeds were: 75.678 miles per hour (121.792 km/h) as the average speed and 84.230 miles per hour (135.555 km/h) as the pole position speed. Two cautions were given for an unknown number of laps.

Total winnings for this race were $4,490 ($45,872 when adjusted for inflation).

Most of the stock car owners were independent with only three "corporate" racing teams showing up for the event. Buddy Baker ended up as the last-place finisher; he would only finish nine laps out of the regulation length of 200 laps due to a problem with the back of his Plymouth vehicle. Most of the starting grid would drive automobiles designed by the Ford Motor Company; with the now-dominant Chevrolet brand only fielding three vehicles.

Notable crew chiefs who actively participated in the race were Lanty McClung, Herb Nab, and John Ervin.

=== Qualifying ===
Grid	No.	Driver	Manufacturer	Owner
1	11	Ned Jarrett	'65 Ford	Bondy Long
2	49	G.C. Spencer	'64 Ford	G.C. Spencer
3	29	Dick Hutcherson	'65 Ford	Holman-Moody
4	26	Junior Johnson	'65 Ford	Junior Johnson
5	10	Cale Yarborough	'64 Ford	Gary Weaver
6	38	Neil Castles	'64 Dodge	Buck Baker
7	19	J.T. Putney	'65 Chevrolet	Herman Beam
8	55	Tiny Lund	'64 Ford	Lyle Stelter
9	37	Bub Strickler	'64 Ford	Bub Strickler
10	75	Gene Black	'64 Ford	C.L. Crawford

== Timeline ==
Section reference:

- Start of race: Ned Jarrett started the race in the pole position.
- Lap 9: The rear end of Buddy Baker's vehicle became problematic, ending his day on the track.
- Lap 16: Doug Cooper had problems with his engine; forcing him to leave the race.
- Lap 36: The differential on Doug Moore's vehicle became problematic, forcing him to finish in 19th place in a 21-car grid.
- Lap 50: Gene Black's radiator developed problems on this lap.
- Lap 63: Wendell Scott's oil pressure became a safety issue, causing him to exit the event.
- Lap 105: Dick Hutcherson takes over the lead from Ned Jarrett.
- Lap 106: Ned Jarrett takes over the lead from Dick Hutcherson.
- Lap 124: Barry Brooks had a terminal crash, forcing him to withdraw from the event.
- Lap 171: The bell housing on Frank Weathers' vehicle became problematic.
- Lap 176: Junior Johnson developed problems with his vehicle's differential.
- Finish: Ned Jarrett was officially declared the winner of the event.

== Finishing order ==
Section reference:

1. Ned Jarrett (No. 11)
2. Dick Hutcherson (No. 29)
3. Cale Yarborough (No. 10)
4. G.C. Spencer (No. 49)
5. Danny Byrd (No. 08)
6. J.T. Putney (No. 19)
7. Neil Castles (No. 38)
8. Bub Strickler (No. 37)
9. Ned Setzer (No. 16)
10. Tiny Lund (No. 55)
11. Bob Derrington (No. 68)
12. Junior Johnson* (No. 26)
13. Gene Hobby (No. 99)
14. Frank Weathers* (No. 81)
15. Barry Brooks* (No. 61)
16. Darel Dieringer* (No. 31)
17. Wendell Scott* (No. 34)
18. Gene Black* (No. 75)
19. Doug Moore* (No. 58)
20. Doug Cooper* (No. 60)
21. Buddy Baker* (No. 86)

* Driver failed to finish race
