= 1965 Wilkes 400 =

Auto race held at North Wilkesboro Speedway in 1965

Race details
- Race 51 of 55 in the 1965 NASCAR Grand National Series season
- North Wilkesboro Speedway
- Date: October 3, 1965
- Official name: Wilkes 400
- Location: North Wilkesboro Speedway, North Wilkesboro, North Carolina
- Course: Permanent racing facility
- Course length: 0.625 miles (1.005 km)
- Distance: 400 laps, 250 mi (402 km)
- Weather: Warm with temperatures of 79 °F (26 °C); wind speeds of 10.1 miles per hour (16.3 km/h)
- Average speed: 88.801 mph (142.911 km/h)
- Attendance: 15,500

Pole position
Driver	Fred Lorenzen	Holman Moody
- Time: 22.150 seconds

Most laps led
Driver	Junior Johnson	Junior Johnson & Associates
- Laps: 204

Winner
No. 26	Junior Johnson	Junior Johnson & Associates

Television in the United States
- Network: untelevised
- Announcers: none

The 1965 Wilkes 400 was a NASCAR Grand National Series event that was held on October 3, 1965, at North Wilkesboro Speedway in North Wilkesboro, North Carolina.

The transition to purpose-built racecars began in the early 1960s and occurred gradually over that decade. Changes made to the sport by the late 1960s brought an end to the "strictly stock" vehicles of the 1950s.

== Background ==
Through the 1960s and 1970s the NASCAR Grand National Series began focusing on bigger, faster, and longer tracks. Like other short tracks in NASCAR at the time, crowd capacity and purses were small compared to the larger tracks. Over time, Enoch Staley and Jack Combs attempted to keep the facility modern and on pace with the growth of the sport. The West Grandstand was rebuilt with chair-type seats rather than the old bare concrete slabs. New larger restroom facilities were built, and the South Grandstand was expanded. A garage facility was also built within the track, which at the time was rare for short-track venues. But the main focus was on keeping ticket prices affordable. Food and beverage prices were kept low, and event parking and camping were always free. As long as profits covered maintenance costs, Staley was satisfied with the income of the track.

In the Gwyn Staley 160 of 1960, Junior Johnson beat 21 other drivers for the pole position with a lap speed of 83.860 mph. Glen Wood overtook Johnson to lead the first lap, but Johnson had the race under control and led the next 145 laps. Lee Petty moved up from the eighth starting position to challenge Johnson late in the race. With 14 laps remaining, Johnson and Petty made contact. Johnson's car was sent spinning into the guardrail. Petty lead the final 14 laps to win his third straight race at North Wilkesboro. The crowd of 9,200 pelted Petty with bottles, rocks, and debris after his win; he had done their local hero wrong. When Petty took the microphone in Victory Lane to explain his side of the story, the crowd began jeering. Rex White finished second, and Wood placed third. Ned Jarrett finished fourth under the alias John Lentz.

The length of the fall race in 1960 was increased from its usual 160 laps / 100 miles to 320 laps / 200 miles, this it became known as the Wilkes 320. Speeds increased immensely from the previous record, 1.83 seconds quicker than any previous qualifying lap (86.806 to 93.399 mph). Rex White posted the fastest qualifying lap and dethroned Lee Petty from his three-race winning streak at North Wilkesboro. Junior Johnson finished about half a lap behind White in second place.

In the 1961 running of the Gwyn Staley 400, Junior Johnson recorded another pole, this time by 0.57 seconds better than the previous track record, with his qualifying time of 23.52 (95.660 mph). Johnson led all of the 62 laps he ran before transmission problems forced him out of the race. Fred Lorenzen led the next 61 laps until engine problems took him out of the running. And Curtis Turner led 56 laps before experiencing problems as well. 1960 Grand National Champion Rex White, who started on the outside pole, led the remaining 221 laps and won the race. Tommy Irwin started the race in sixth position and finished the Gwyn Staley 400 two laps behind White. Richard Petty followed in third place. Fireball Roberts, in a Pontiac owned by Smokey Yunick, finished fourth (ten laps down), and Johnny Allen, who crashed out of the race on his 387th lap, still finished in fifth place. Only 12 of the 25 cars that entered the race were running at the finish of the first 400-lap edition of the Gwyn Staley race.

In the 1963 Wilkes 400, Fred Lorenzen captured his third straight pole at the track by breaking his own record with a lap time of 23.30 seconds / 96.566 mph. Richard Petty entered the race in an attempt to become the first driver to win four consecutive races at North Wilkesboro. But he experienced engine problems and lasted only 45 laps into the race. Lorenzen led 58 laps, but came up short of victory, six seconds behind winner Marvin Panch. Panch did not start the 1963 season until halfway through because he had nearly lost his life in a crash while testing a Maserati at Daytona that February. Panch, in a Wood Brothers car, started third and led 131 laps in the race. Holman-Moody took the next three spots in the final rundown, with Lorenzen second, Nelson Stacy third, and Fireball Roberts fourth. Stacy started fourth and led 56 laps, while Roberts started from the outside pole and led the most laps with 155.

The track was repaved just prior to the Gwyn Staley 400 in 1964, and the resulting lack of traction wreaked havoc. Fireball Roberts, Buck Baker, Buddy Arrington, and G.C. Spencer all crashed through the wooden guardrail in the first and second turns in Saturday's practice and qualifying. Roberts was unable to start the race because his Ford had been so heavily damaged. Fred Lorenzen won the pole and led 368 laps on the way to the win.

== Race report ==
During this 400-lap event, the only drivers to clinch the lead were Fred Lorenzen, Junior Johnson, and Cale Yarborough. There were 35 drivers who qualified for this race; Buddy Arrington would be credited as the last-place due to being involved in an engine failure-induced accident with three other drivers on his thirteenth lap. All of the drivers on the racing grid were born in the United States of America. Most of the automobiles present at this race belong to the Ford manufacturer.

Fifteen thousand fans would see an event that would last for two hours and forty-eight minutes. Fred Lorenzen would qualify for the pole position by virtue of driving up to 101.58 miles per hour or 163.48 kilometres per hour during his solo qualifying session. Only two of the top-ten finishers would drive a Dodge vehicle while Chevrolet stock cars would finish anywhere between the middle of the pack to near the end of the pack. Junior Johnson defeated Cale Yarborough by two laps in order to clinch his final victory ever in the NASCAR Cup Series.

Frank Weathers would retire from driving in the top-level NASCAR series after this event. John Ervin, Herb Nab and Dale Inman where the three most notable crew chiefs to participate in this event.

Individual winnings for each driver ranged from $4,475 for Junior Johnson ($45,719 when inflation is taken into effect) and $150 for Buddy Arrington ($1,532 when inflation is taken into effect). Total winnings assigned for this racing event by NASCAR officials was $17,050 ($174,191 when inflation is taken into effect).

=== Qualifying ===
Grid	No.	Driver	Manufacturer	Speed	Qualifying time	Owner
1	28	Fred Lorenzen	'65 Ford	101.580	22.150	Holman-Moody
2	43	Richard Petty	'65 Plymouth	101.169	22.240	Petty Enterprises
3	29	Dick Hutcherson	'65 Ford	100.402	22.410	Holman-Moody
4	6	David Pearson	'65 Dodge	100.357	22.420	Cotton Owens
5	26	Junior Johnson	'65 Ford	100.312	22.430	Junior Johnson
6	27	Cale Yarborough	'65 Ford	100.312	22.430	Banjo Matthews
7	11	Ned Jarrett	'65 Ford	99.426	22.630	Bondy Long
8	21	Marvin Panch	'65 Ford	99.426	22.630	Wood Brothers
9	35	Bobby Isaac	'65 Dodge	98.039	22.950	Ray Nichels
10	17	Junior Spencer	'64 Ford	97.318	23.120	Jerry Mullins

== Top 10 finishers ==
Pos	Grid	No.	Driver	Manufacturer	Laps	Winnings	Laps led	Time/Status
1	5	26	Junior Johnson	Ford	400	$4,475	204	2:48:55
2	6	27	Cale Yarborough	Ford	398	$2,125	6	+2 laps
3	7	11	Ned Jarrett	Ford	398	$1,275	0	+2 laps
4	4	6	David Pearson	Dodge	397	$825	0	+3 laps
5	11	47	Curtis Turner	Ford	396	$675	0	+4 laps
6	8	21	Marvin Panch	Ford	396	$525	0	+4 laps
7	10	17	Junior Spencer	Ford	394	$475	0	+6 laps
8	21	59	Tom Pistone	Ford	393	$500	0	+7 laps
9	12	49	G.C. Spencer	Ford	392	$400	0	+8 laps
10	17	88	Buddy Baker	Dodge	389	$325	0	+11 laps

== Timeline ==
Section reference:

- Start of race: Fred Lorenzen starts the race with the pole position.
- Lap 13: Buddy Arrington had an engine failure-induced accident; forcing him to become the first driver to retire from the event.
- Lap 14: Richard Petty and Bobby Isaac would crash at the same time, ending both of their chances of winning the race.
- Lap 35: Roy Tyner's vehicle would suffer from an engine failure.
- Lap 82: Henley Gray had a terminal crash, forcing him to withdraw from the race.
- Lap 93: Sam McQuagg noticed this his vehicle's gas tank was acting strangely.
- Lap 98: An axle on Neil Castles' vehicle developed problems.
- Lap 119: Frank Weathers could not handle his vehicle properly anymore.
- Lap 154: An oil leak ended Jabe Thomas' chance of winning the race.
- Lap 174: Jimmy Helms' vehicle suddenly started vibrating in an unusual manner.
- Lap 191: Junior Johnson takes over the lead from Fred Lorenzen.
- Lap 198: Paul Lewis' vehicle developed engine problems, taking him out of the race.
- Lap 211: Wayne Smith just could not steer his vehicle properly anymore.
- Lap 219: Fred Lorenzen started having engine problems, forcing him out of the event.
- Lap 311: Cale Yarborough takes over the lead from Junior Johnson.
- Lap 317: Junior Johnson takes over the lead from Cale Yarborough
- Lap 318: Roy Mayne became the final DNF of the race due to problems with his car's engine.
- Finish: Junior Johnson wins the race directly from the pole position.

Preceded by 1965 Old Dominion 500	NASCAR Grand National Series Season; 1965	Succeeded by 1965 National 400

Preceded by 1964	Wilkes 400 races 1965	Succeeded by 1966
