= Bill Ellis =

English cricketer

Personal information
- Full name: William Ellis
- Born: 15 August 1919; Rolleston, Nottinghamshire, England
- Died: 9 June 2007 (aged 87); Dewsbury, Yorkshire, England
- Batting: Right-handed
- Bowling: Right-arm fast-medium

Domestic team information
- Years: Team
- 1948: Nottinghamshire

Career statistics
Competition	First-class
Matches	2
Runs scored	79
Batting average	19.75
100s/50s	–/–
Top score	45
Balls bowled	–
Wickets	–
Bowling average	–
5 wickets in innings	–
10 wickets in match	–
Best bowling	–
Catches/stumpings	1/–
- Source: Cricinfo, 20 May 2012

William Ellis (15 August 1919 – 9 June 2007) was an English cricketer. Ellis was a right-handed batsman who bowled right-arm fast-medium. He was born at Rolleston, Nottinghamshire.

Ellis made two first-class appearances for Nottinghamshire in the 1948 County Championship, against Leicestershire and Worcestershire, with both matches played at Trent Bridge. Against Leicestershire, Nottinghamshire won the toss and elected to bat first, making 176/6 declared, with Ellis not required to bat. Leicestershire responded in their first-innings by making 169/6, at which point the match, heavily impacted by adverse weather, was declared a draw. In his second match, Worcestershire won the toss and elected to bat, making 200 all out. In response, Nottinghamshire made 334 all out in their first-innings, with Ellis being dismissed for 29 by Peter Jackson. Worcestershire reached 295/3 in their second-innings, with Ellis taking a single wicket, that of centurion Roly Jenkins for 109, to finish with figures of 1/49 from fifteen overs.

He died at Dewsbury, Yorkshire, on 9 June 2007.
