= 1965 Atlanta 500 =

Auto race run in Georgia in 1965

Race details
- Race 9 of 55 in the 1965 NASCAR Grand National Series season
- Layout of Atlanta International Raceway, used until 1996
- Date: April 11, 1965
- Official name: Atlanta 500
- Location: Atlanta International Raceway, Hampton, Georgia
- Course: Permanent racing facility
- Course length: 1.500 miles (2.400 km)
- Distance: 334 laps, 501.0 mi (804 km)
- Weather: Temperatures of 80.1 °F (26.7 °C); wind speeds up to 13 miles per hour (21 km/h)
- Average speed: 129.410 miles per hour (208.265 km/h)
- Attendance: 50,700

Pole position
Driver	Marvin Panch	Wood Brothers
- Time: 150.547 seconds

Most laps led
Driver	Marvin Panch	Wood Brothers
- Laps: 241

Winner
No. 24	Marvin Panch	Wood Brothers

Television in the United States
- Network: untelevised
- Announcers: none

The 1965 Atlanta 500 was a NASCAR Grand National Series event that was held on April 11, 1965, at Atlanta International Raceway in Hampton, Georgia.

The transition to purpose-built racecars began in the early 1960s and occurred gradually over that decade. Changes made to the sport by the late 1960s brought an end to the "strictly stock" vehicles of the 1950s.

== Background ==
Atlanta International Raceway (now Atlanta Motor Speedway) is one of ten current intermediate tracks to hold NASCAR races. The layout at Atlanta International Speedway at the time was a four-turn traditional oval track that is 1.54 miles (2.48 km) long. The track's turns are banked at twenty-four degrees, while the front stretch, the location of the finish line, and the back stretch are banked at five.

== Race report ==
There were 44 drivers on the grid. This race was the sixth Atlanta 500 to ever take place in the NASCAR Cup Series. However, the racing series would ultimately come to an end in 2011 to make room for a race at Kentucky Speedway. While the previous year's race was televised on CBS, this race was completely unbroadcast on television.

Jim Conway would be the race's last-place finisher due to a clutch issue on lap 1 out of 334 laps. Marvin Panch defeated Bobby Johns by two seconds in front of 50,700 people in his 1965 Ford Galaxie vehicle. However, it was relief driver and fellow Woods Brothers racer A.J. Foyt who took the checkered flag in the No. 21 Ford, Panch received credit for the win by virtue of NASCAR rules and regulations. There were eight lead changes in addition to five caution flags waved for 26 laps; making this race last almost four hours in length.

The average speed of the race was 129.410 miles per hour (208.265 km/h) while Panch earned the pole position with a qualifying speed of 145.581 miles per hour (234.290 km/h). Other drivers in the top ten were: Ned Jarrett, Dick Hutcherson, Buddy Baker, Tiny Lund, Bobby Allison, Larry Hess, Paul Lewis, and Bub Strickler.

Vehicles manufactured by the Ford Motor Company had the monopoly on this race. Jim Conway would make his introduction into the NASCAR Cup Series while Danny Byrd would leave the series after this race.

This race took place on the same day as the infamous 1965 Palm Sunday Tornado outbreak that occurred in the Ohio Valley.

=== Qualifying ===
Grid	No.	Driver	Manufacturer	Qualifying time	Speed	Owner
1	21	Marvin Panch	'65 Ford	150.547	145.581	Wood Brothers
2	16	Darel Dieringer	'64 Mercury	150.556	145.572	Bud Moore
3	15	Earl Balmer	'64 Mercury	150.699	145.434	Bud Moore
4	11	Ned Jarrett	'65 Ford	152.332	143.875	Bondy Long
5	29	Dick Hutcherson	'65 Ford	152.403	143.808	Holman-Moody Racing
6	41	A.J. Foyt	'65 Ford	152.505	143.712	Wood Brothers
7	7	Bobby Johns	'65 Ford	152.688	143.540	Holman-Moody Racing
8	76	Larry Frank	'64 Ford	154.057	142.264	Larry Frank
9	26	Junior Johnson	'65 Ford	154.087	142.236	Junior Johnson
10	24	Sam McQuagg	'65 Ford	155.468	140.973	Betty Lilly

== Timeline ==
Section reference:

- Start of race: Darel Dieringer officially began the race with the pole position.
- Lap 1: Jim Conway managed to lose control over his vehicle's clutch.
- Lap 2: Vehicle handling issues managed to take Bud Harless out of the race.
- Lap 5: Cotton Wallace had to leave the race because his tires were rubbing with his vehicle; Robert Vaughn experienced oil pressure issues.
- Lap 12: Sway bar issues managed to take Ned Setzer out of the race.
- Lap 13: Buddy Arrington managed to lose control over his vehicle's clutch.
- Lap 24: Tim Pistone fell out with engine failure.
- Lap 26: The head gasket came off Reb Wickersham's vehicle; forcing him out of the race.
- Lap 29: Oil pressure issues caused Wendell Scott to abandon the race.
- Lap 41: Earl Balmer took over the lead from Darel Dieringer.
- Lap 47: Fred Lorenzen took over the lead from Earl Balmer.
- Lap 71: Marvin Panch took over the lead from Fred Lorenzen.
- Lap 104: Bobby Johns took over the lead from Marvin Panch.
- Lap 108: Marvin Panch took over the lead from Bobby Johns.
- Lap 110: Junior Johnson managed to overheat his vehicle, the cause was racing at excessively high speeds.
- Lap 112: E.J. Trivette had engine problems which forced him out of the race in an untimely manner.
- Lap 132: Darel Dieringer had a terminal crash.
- Lap 136: Larry Frank fell out with engine failure.
- Lap 142: Bill Morton managed to overheat his racing vehicle.
- Lap 170: Oil pressure issues managed to eliminate Neil Castles out of the race.
- Lap 178: Fred Lorenzen took over the lead from Marvin Panch.
- Lap 185: Earl Balmer's engine started acting in an unusual manner.
- Lap 189: Marvin Panch took over the lead from Fred Lorenzen.
- Lap 190: J.T. Putney had a terminal crash.
- Lap 193: Cale Yarborough had a terminal crash.
- Lap 214: T.C. Hunt managed to do something that made his engine stop working properly.
- Lap 223: Sam McQuagg managed to overheat his vehicle due to racing at high speeds.
- Lap 250: Fred Lorenzen had a terminal crash.
- Lap 298: Johnny Rutherford fell out with engine failure; forcing him to exit the race for safety reasons.
- Lap 299: G.C. Spencer managed to overheat his vehicle while racing at high speeds.
- Lap 309: Bub Strickler had a terminal crash; forcing him to leave the race prematurely.
- Finish: Marvin Panch was officially declared the winner of the event.

Preceded by 1965 untitled race at Orange Speedway	NASCAR Grand National races 1965	Succeeded by 1965 Greenville 200

Preceded by 1964	Atlanta 500 races 1965	Succeeded by 1966
