= Bub Strickler =

Racecar driver from Virginia

Earl H. Strickler
- Born: December 18, 1938; Timberville, Virginia, U.S.
- Died: January 13, 2005 (aged 66); Harrisonburg, Virginia, U.S.

NASCAR Cup Series career
- 20 races run over 6 years
- Best finish: 33rd – 1965
- First race: 1965 Daytona 500 (Daytona)
- Last race: 1980 Holly Farms 400 (North Wilkesboro)
Wins	Top tens	Poles
0	2	0

Earl H. "Bub" Strickler (December 18, 1938 – January 13, 2005) was an American NASCAR Winston Cup Series driver who competed from 1965 to 1980.

== Career ==
Strickler would compete in 3385 laps of Winston Cup Series racing; for a grand total of 3,149.3 miles (5,068.3 km). His total career earnings would be $11,065 ($43,236.62 when adjusted for inflation). While Strickler would start in 26th place on average; his average finishes would be in 22nd place. Both of Strickler's top-ten finishes would come in his rookie year. Bristol Motor Speedway and Richmond International Raceway would be his best tracks in NASCAR's modern era while Rockingham Speedway would become his worst enemy.

After failing to qualify for the 1972 Miller High Life 500, Strickler would only race on a part-time basis in the NASCAR Cup Series before ultimately retiring after the 1980 season. Strickler's employers included himself, Shorty Johns, Joan Petre, and Jim Norris. The vehicle and sponsor that Strickler would use was the No. 60 Duro-Bond Chevrolet of Jim Norris.

Strickler died on January 13, 2005, at Harrisonburg Health and Rehabilitation Center in Harrisonburg, Virginia, leaving two children.
