= Huntsville Speedway =

Oval race track in Huntsville, Alabama

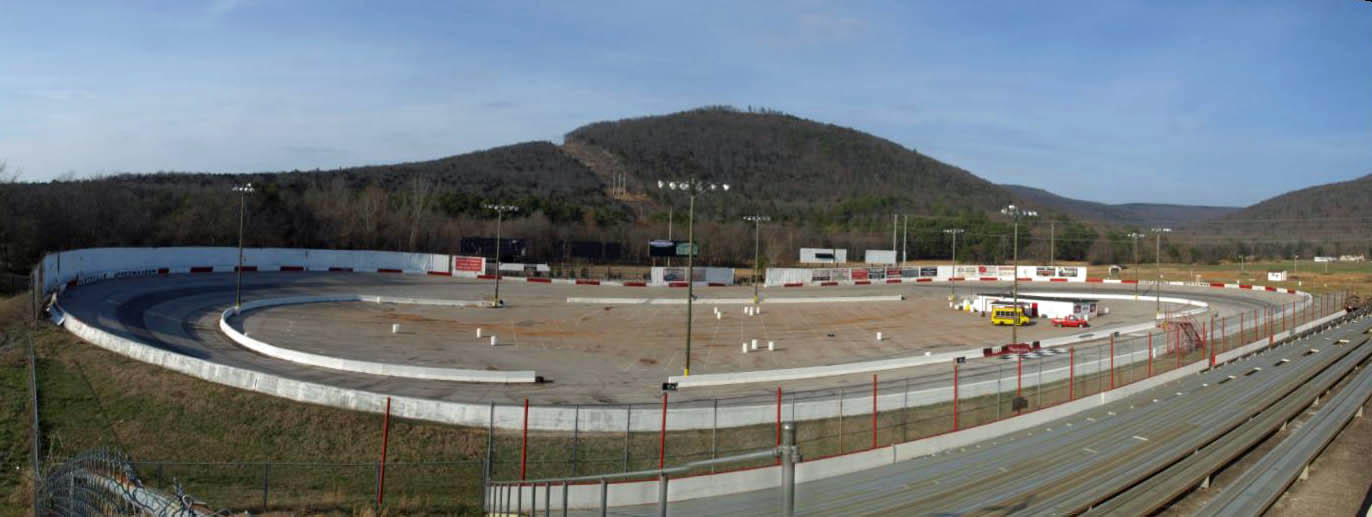
- The speedway in February 2012
- Location: Huntsville, Alabama
- Coordinates: 34°34′5″N 86°32′5″W
- Opened: 1959
- Surface: Dirt (1959–1962} Asphalt (1962–present)
- Length: 0.250 mi (0.402 km)

Huntsville Speedway is a quarter-mile (.402 km) oval race track in Madison County, Alabama just outside Huntsville. It opened in 1959 as a dirt track, and was paved in 1962. It held one NASCAR Grand National Series event in 1962, won by Richard Petty. Today the track hosts weekly racing with a variety of stock car and modified classes. It shut down early in 2013 and has reopened on April 2, 2016. It is hosted for race events for other racing types.

The track also hosted one NASCAR Southeast Series event in 2003 and was won by Shane Sieg.

== NASCAR Grand National results ==
Season	Race Name	Winning driver	Car	Laps	Average Speed
1962	Rocket City 200	Richard Petty	Plymouth	200	54.644 mph (87.941 km/h)
