= Bondy Long =

NASCAR team owner

- Occupation: NASCAR car owner
- Known for: Being a NASCAR car owner during the vintage years of NASCAR

Bondy Long is a former NASCAR Grand National Series race car owner whose career spanned from 1963 to 1968.

== Career summary ==
Long started his ownership career in his 20s, and received factory support from Ford Motor Company. He has employed notable drivers like Larry Frank, Bobby Isaac, James Hylton, Ned Jarrett, and Marvin Panch. Long's vehicles have started an average of seventh place and finished an average of ninth place. His drivers have also managed to lead 7024 laps out of 46,976 complete laps. All of the vehicles that Long has owned have competed in 205 races with 29 wins, 113 finishes in the "top-five," and 133 finishes in the "top-ten." The total distance of the entire collection of Bondy Long's vehicle adds up to 37,304.9 miles (60,036.4 km).

Jarrett would help Long win the championship in 1965 with nine earned pole positions from the qualifying sessions in addition to 13 confirmed race wins.
