= Seven Days Battles =

1862 battles of the American Civil War

- Part of the Peninsula campaign
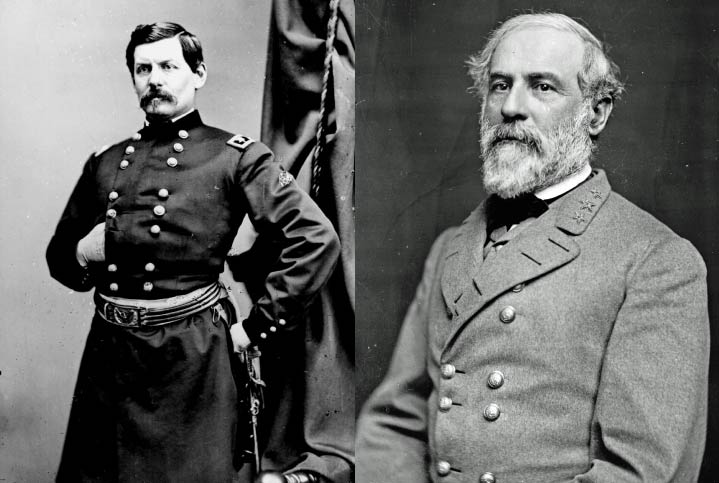
- George B. McClellan and Robert E. Lee, respective commanders of the Union and Confederate armies in the Seven Days Battles
Date	June 25 – July 1, 1862
Location	Hanover County and Henrico County, Virginia
Result	Confederate victory (see § Aftermath)

Belligerents
United States (Union)	(Confederate States of America) Confederate States (Confederacy)

Commanders and leaders
(United States) George B. McClellan	Robert E. Lee

Units involved
(United States) Army of the Potomac	Army of Northern Virginia

Strength
101,434 ("present for duty"): 105,445 (Army of the Potomac without Dix's Division); 9,246 (Dix's Division at Fort Monroe, Va);	112,200 "present for duty"

Casualties and losses
15,855; 1,734 killed 8,066 wounded 6,055 missing/captured	20,204; 3,494 killed 15,758 wounded 952 missing/captured

The Seven Days Battles were a series of seven battles over seven days from June 25 to July 1, 1862, near Richmond, Virginia, during the American Civil War. Confederate General Robert E. Lee drove the Union army's Army of the Potomac, commanded by Maj. Gen. George B. McClellan, away from Richmond and into a retreat down the Virginia Peninsula. The series of battles is sometimes known erroneously as the Seven Days campaign, but it was actually the culmination of the Peninsula campaign, not a separate campaign in its own right.

The Seven Days began on Wednesday, June 25, 1862, with a Union attack in the minor Battle of Oak Grove, but McClellan quickly lost the initiative as Lee began a series of attacks at Beaver Dam Creek (Mechanicsville) on June 26, Gaines' Mill on June 27, the minor actions at Garnett's and Golding's Farm on June 27 and 28, and the attack on the Union rear guard at Savage's Station on June 29. McClellan's Army of the Potomac continued its retreat toward the safety of Harrison's Landing on the James River. Lee's final opportunity to intercept the Union army was at the Battle of Glendale on June 30, but poorly executed orders and the delay of Stonewall Jackson's troops allowed his enemy to escape to a strong defensive position on Malvern Hill. At the Battle of Malvern Hill on July 1, Lee launched futile frontal assaults and suffered heavy casualties in the face of strong infantry and artillery defenses.

The Seven Days ended with McClellan's army in relative safety next to the James River, having suffered almost 16,000 casualties during the retreat. Lee's army, which had been on the offensive during the Seven Days, lost over 20,000. As Lee became convinced that McClellan would not resume his threat against Richmond, he moved north for the northern Virginia campaign and the Maryland campaign.

== Background ==
=== The Peninsula campaign ===
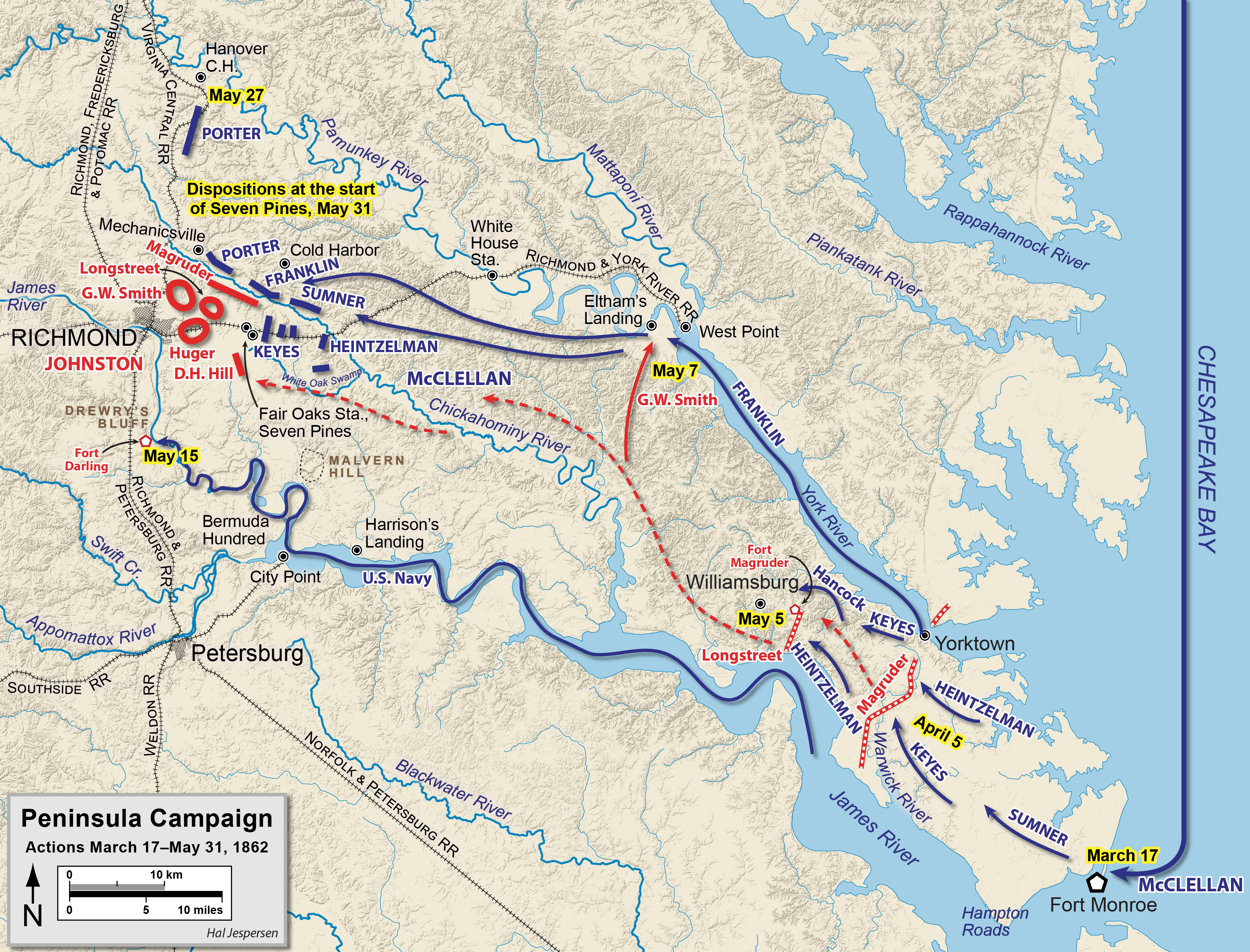
Map of events during the Peninsula campaign to the Battle of Seven Pines Confederate Union

The Peninsula campaign was the unsuccessful attempt by McClellan to capture the Confederate capital of Richmond and end the war. It started in March 1862, when McClellan landed his army at Fort Monroe and moved northwest, up the Virginia Peninsula beginning in early April. Confederate Brig. Gen. John B. Magruder's defensive position on the Warwick Line caught McClellan by surprise. His hopes for a quick advance foiled, McClellan ordered his army to prepare for a siege of Yorktown. Just before the siege preparations were completed, the Confederates, then under the direct command of Johnston, began a withdrawal toward Richmond.

The first heavy fighting of the campaign occurred in the Battle of Williamsburg (May 5), in which the Union troops managed some tactical victories, but the Confederates continued their withdrawal. An amphibious flanking movement to Eltham's Landing (May 7) was ineffective in cutting off the Confederate retreat. In the Battle of Drewry's Bluff (May 15), an attempt by the United States Navy to reach Richmond by way of the James River was repulsed.

As McClellan's army reached the outskirts of Richmond, a minor battle occurred at Hanover Court House (May 27), but it was followed by a surprise attack by Johnston at the Battle of Seven Pines or Fair Oaks on May 31 and June 1. The battle was inconclusive, with heavy casualties, but it had lasting effects on the campaign. Johnston was wounded and replaced on June 1 by the more aggressive Robert E. Lee. Lee spent almost a month extending his defensive lines and organizing his Army of Northern Virginia; McClellan accommodated this by sitting passively to his front, waiting for dry weather and roads, until the start of the Seven Days. Lee, who had developed a reputation for caution early in the war, knew he had no numerical superiority over McClellan, but he planned an offensive campaign that was the first indication of the aggressive nature he would display for the remainder of the war.

=== Planning for offensives ===
Lee's initial attack plan, similar to Johnston's plan at Seven Pines, was complex and required expert coordination and execution by all of his subordinates, but Lee knew that he could not win in a battle of attrition or siege against the Union army. It was developed at a meeting on June 23. The Union army straddled the rain-swollen Chickahominy River, with the bulk of the army, four corps, arrayed in a semicircular line south of the river. The remainder, the V Corps under Brig. Gen. Fitz John Porter, was north of the river near Mechanicsville in an L-shaped line facing north–south behind Beaver Dam Creek and southeast along the Chickahominy. Lee's plan was to cross the Chickahominy with the bulk of his army to attack the Union north flank, leaving only two divisions (under Maj. Gens. Benjamin Huger and John B. Magruder) to hold a line of entrenchments against McClellan's superior strength. This would concentrate about 65,500 troops to oppose 30,000, leaving only 25,000 to protect Richmond and to contain the other 60,000 men of the Union army. The Confederate cavalry under Brig. Gen. J.E.B. Stuart had reconnoitered Porter's right flank—as part of a daring but militarily dubious circumnavigation of the entire Union army from June 12 to 15—and found it vulnerable.

Lee intended for Jackson to attack Porter's right flank early on the morning of June 26, and A.P. Hill would move from Meadow Bridge to Beaver Dam Creek, which flows into the Chickahominy, advancing on the Federal trenches. (Lee hoped that Porter would evacuate his trenches under pressure, obviating the need for a direct frontal assault.) Following this, Longstreet and D.H. Hill would pass through Mechanicsville and join the battle. Huger and Magruder would provide diversions on their fronts to distract McClellan as to Lee's real intentions. Lee hoped that Porter would be overwhelmed from two sides by the mass of 65,000 men, and the two leading Confederate divisions would move on Cold Harbor and cut McClellan's communications with White House Landing.

McClellan also planned an offensive. He had received intelligence that Lee was prepared to move and that the arrival of Maj. Gen. Thomas J. "Stonewall" Jackson's force from the Shenandoah Valley was imminent (McClellan was aware of Jackson's presence at Ashland Station, but did nothing to reinforce Porter's vulnerable corps north of the river). He decided to resume the offensive before Lee could. Anticipating Jackson's reinforcements marching from the north, he increased cavalry patrols on likely avenues of approach. He wanted to advance his siege artillery about a mile and a half closer to the city by taking the high ground on Nine Mile Road around Old Tavern. In preparation for that, he planned an attack on Oak Grove, south of Old Tavern and the Richmond and York River Railroad, which would position his men to attack Old Tavern from two directions.

== Opposing forces ==
The armies that fought in the Seven Days Battles comprised almost 200,000 men, which offered the potential for the largest battles of the war. However, the inexperience or caution of the generals involved usually prevented the appropriate concentration of forces and mass necessary for decisive tactical victories.

The Confederate army was not a proper unified command as the Army of the Potomac was, but simply a thrown-together collection of all the troops that could be gathered for the defense of Richmond. This contributed to the poor coordination of the army during the battles and the inability of Robert E. Lee to destroy the Union army.

The average strength of a division in the Army of the Potomac was about 9000 men (including non-combatants) with Casey's division being the smallest at around 7000 and Morell's being the largest at 11,000 men. The average strength of Confederate divisions varied from 12,000 men (A.P. Hill's division) to 5000 men (Theophilus Holmes's division). Confederate reports listed only combat troops and excluded non-combatants such as couriers, staff officers, and wagon drivers. Jackson's command was severely understrength from the Valley campaign and his own division had less than 2000 men, most of them being in the Stonewall Brigade while the brigades of Samuel Fulkerson and John R. Jones were down to nearly regimental size and were held in reserve for most of the Seven Days Battles. Ewell's three brigades numbered 3000 men total. Jackson was reinforced with the brigade of Alexander Lawton, recently arrived from Georgia, and numbering 3500 men. This brought his total strength to around 8000 men.

D.H. Hill's division numbered around 7700 men, having numbered close to 10,000 before the heavy losses at Seven Pines. They were reinforced with Roswell Ripley's brigade, newly arrived from North Carolina, and numbering 2300 men, bringing the total strength of Hill's command to 10,000 men. James Longstreet's division numbered 9050 men on June 25 according to army ordnance chief Edward P. Alexander. It had numbered close to 12,000 men prior to losses at Seven Pines. Benjamin Huger's division numbered approximately 8600 men. William Whiting had around 4000 men in his two brigades. John Magruder's three divisions numbered about 13,000 men.

=== Union ===
Union corps commanders
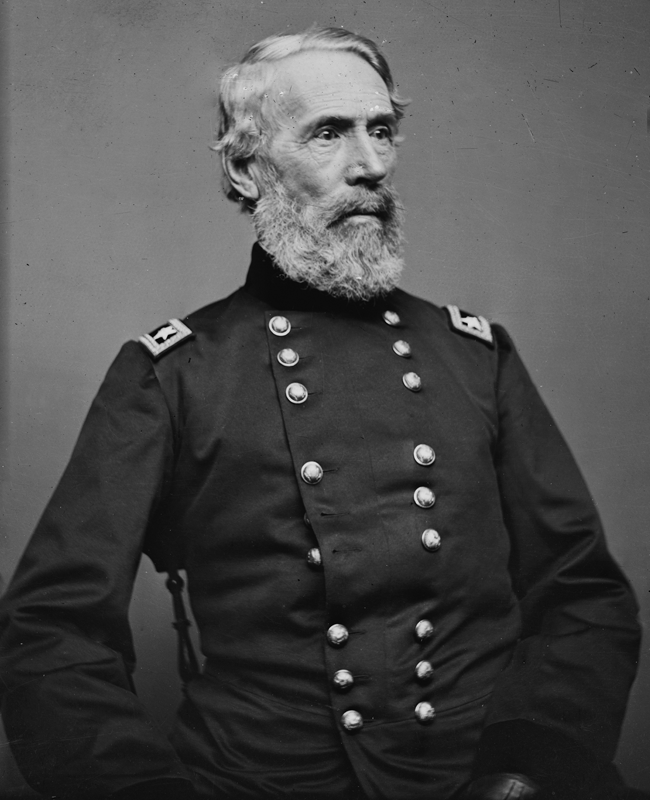
Brig. Gen.
Edwin V. Sumner

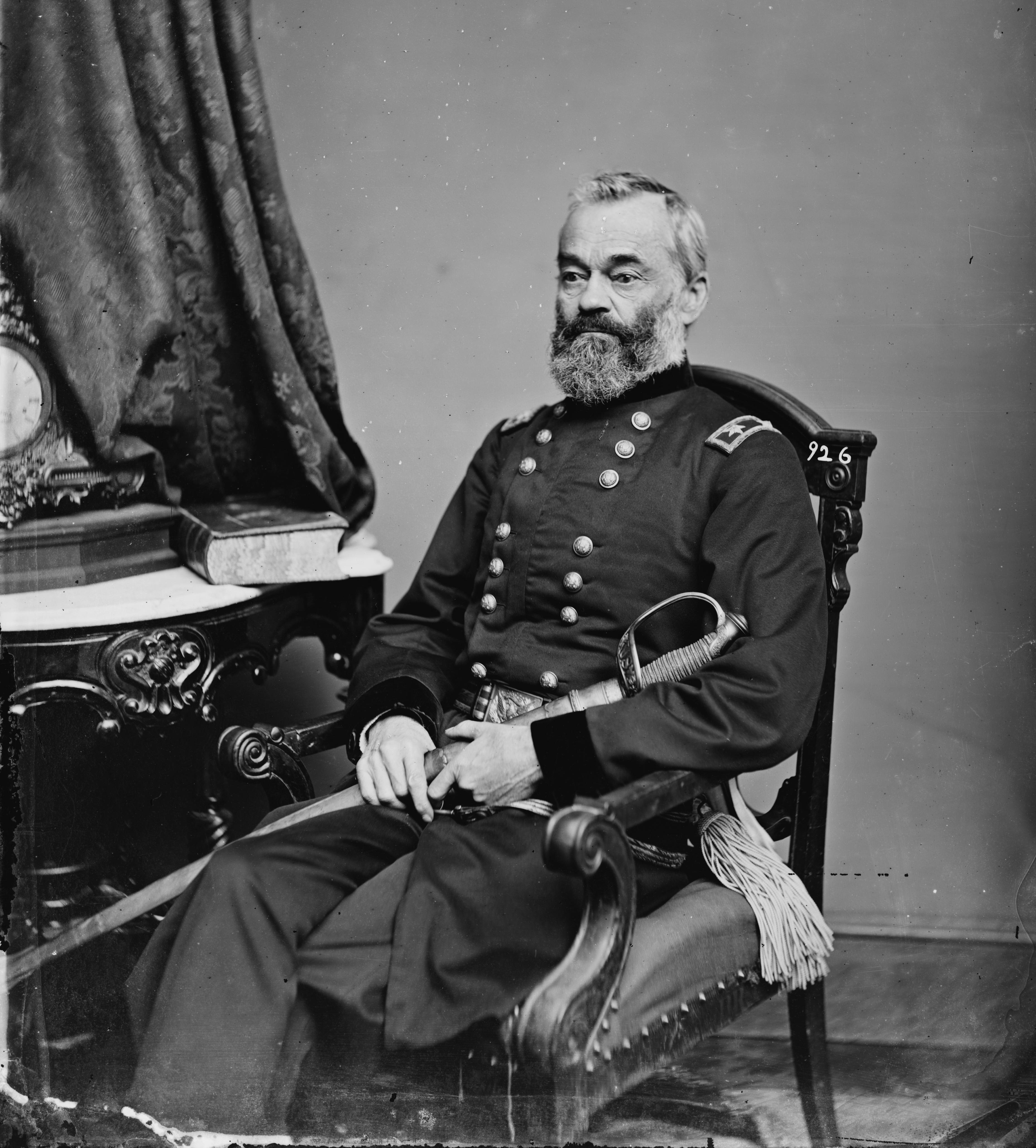
Brig. Gen.
Samuel P. Heintzelman

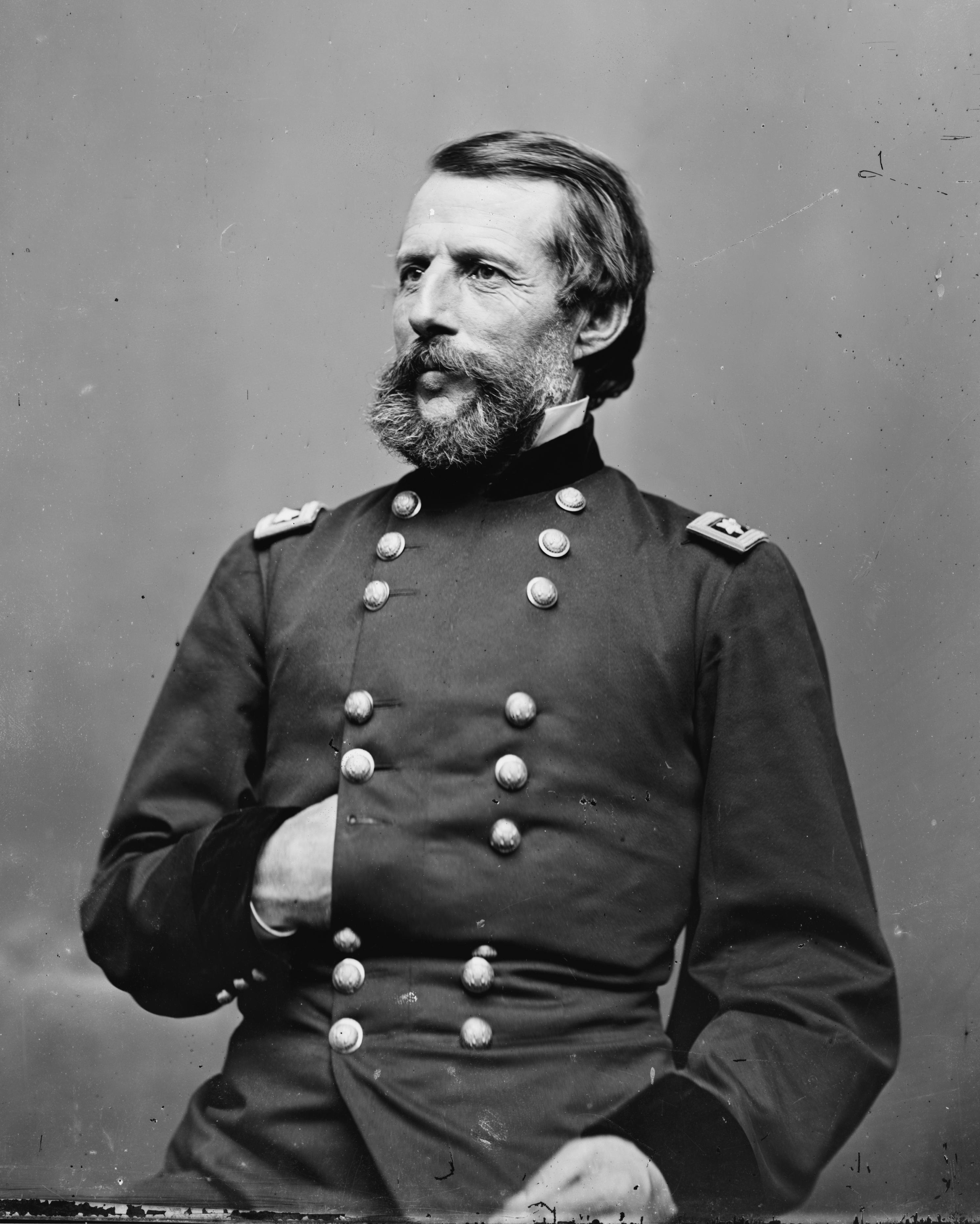
Brig. Gen.
Erasmus D. Keyes

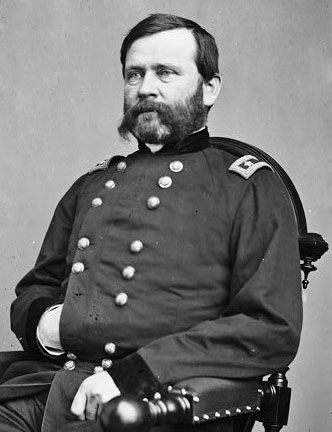
Brig. Gen.
William B. Franklin

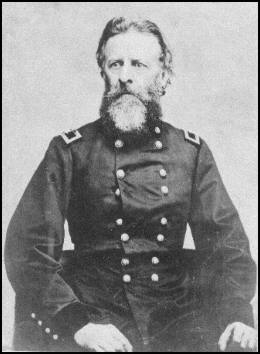
Brig. Gen.
Philip St. George Cooke

McClellan's Army of the Potomac, with approximately 105,000 men, was organized largely as it had been at Seven Pines.

- II Corps, Brig. Gen. Edwin V. Sumner commanding: divisions of Brig. Gens. Israel B. Richardson and John Sedgwick.
- III Corps, Brig. Gen. Samuel P. Heintzelman commanding: divisions of Brig. Gens. Joseph Hooker and Philip Kearny.
- IV Corps, Brig. Gen. Erasmus D. Keyes commanding: divisions of Brig. Gens. Darius N. Couch and John J. Peck.
- V Corps, Brig. Gen. Fitz John Porter commanding: divisions of Brig. Gens. George W. Morell, George Sykes, and George A. McCall.
- VI Corps, Brig. Gen. William B. Franklin commanding: divisions of Brig. Gens. Henry W. Slocum and William F. "Baldy" Smith.
- Reserve forces included the cavalry reserve under Brig. Gen. Philip St. George Cooke (Jeb Stuart's father-in-law) and the supply base at White House Landing under Brig. Gen. Silas Casey.

=== Confederate ===
Confederate commanders
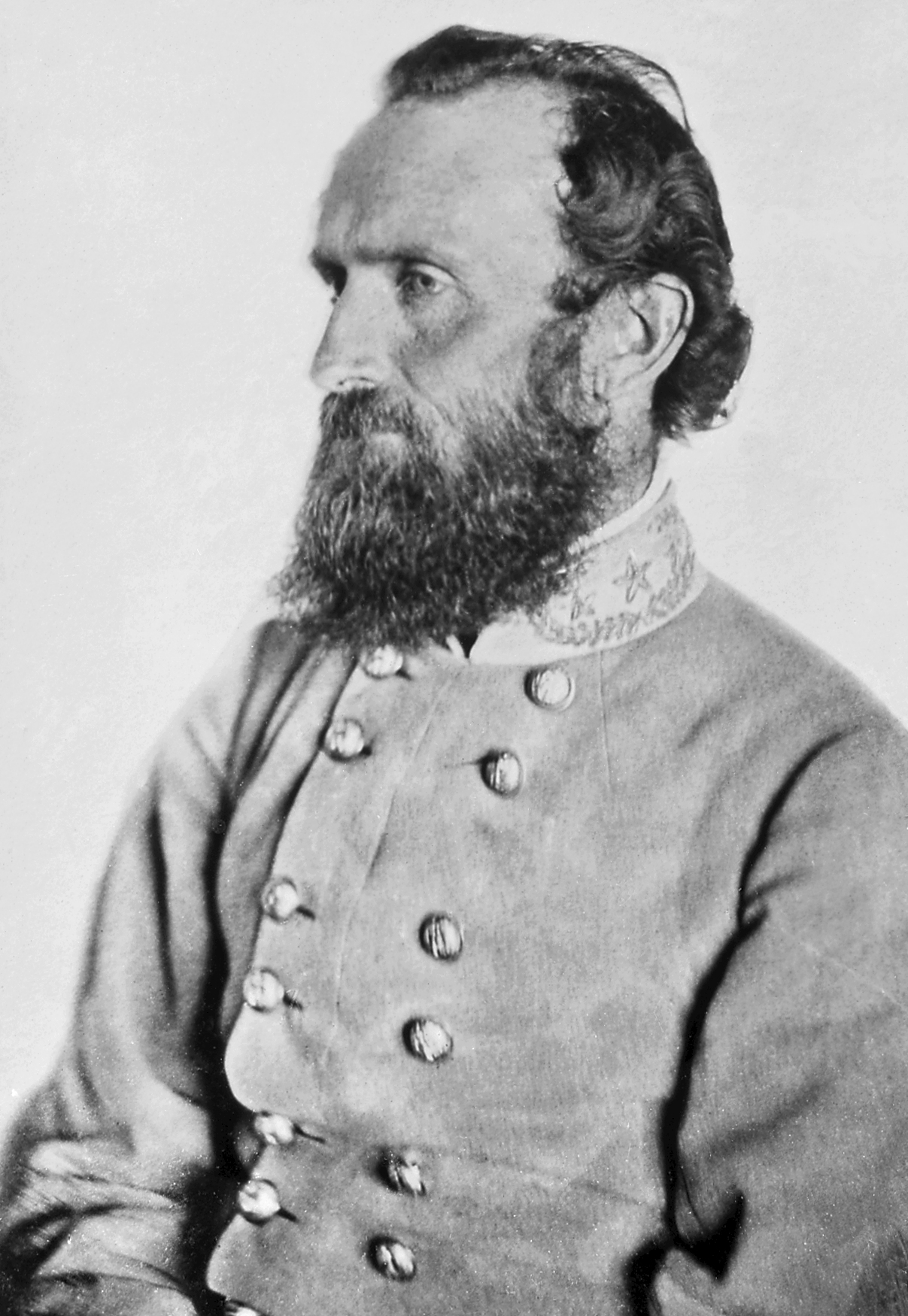
Maj. Gen.
Stonewall Jackson

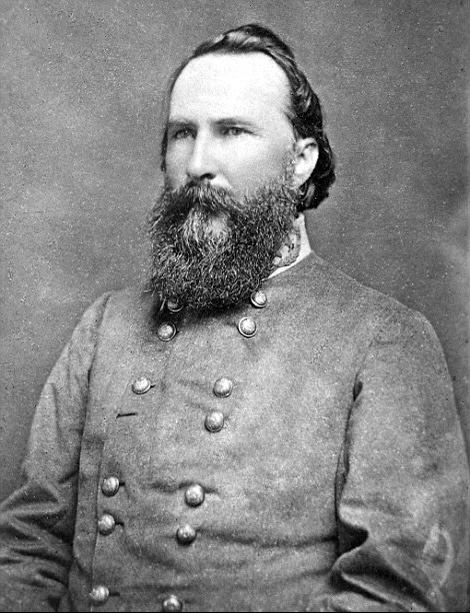
Maj. Gen.
James Longstreet

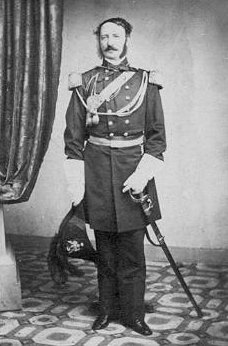
Maj. Gen.
John B. Magruder

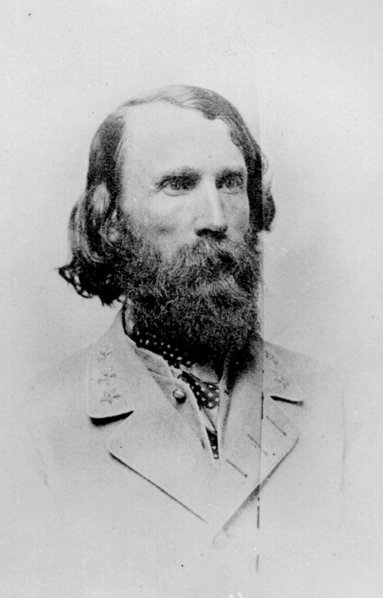
Maj. Gen.
A. P. Hill

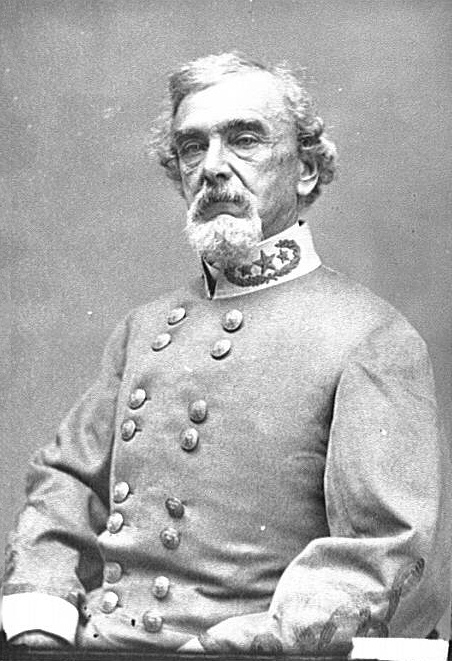
Maj. Gen.
Benjamin Huger

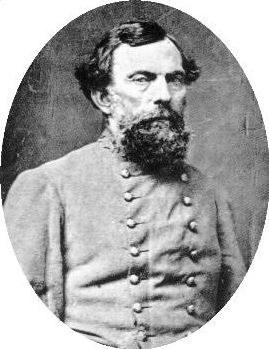
Maj. Gen.
Theophilus H. Holmes

Lee's Army of Northern Virginia was larger than the one he inherited from Johnston, and, at about 92,000 men, the largest Confederate army assembled during the war.

- Maj. Gen. Thomas J. "Stonewall" Jackson, having just arrived from his victories in the Valley campaign, commanded a force consisting of his own division (then commanded by Brig. Gen. Charles S. Winder) and those of Maj. Gen. Richard S. Ewell, Brig. Gen. William H. C. Whiting, and Maj. Gen. D.H. Hill.
- Maj. Gen. A.P. Hill's "Light Division" (which was so named because it traveled light and was able to maneuver and strike quickly) consisted of the brigades of Brig. Gens. Charles W. Field, Maxcy Gregg, Joseph R. Anderson, Lawrence O'Bryan Branch, James J. Archer, and William Dorsey Pender.
- Maj. Gen. James Longstreet's division consisted of the brigades of Brig. Gens. James L. Kemper, Richard H. Anderson, George E. Pickett, Cadmus M. Wilcox, Roger A. Pryor, and Winfield Scott Featherston. Longstreet also had operational command over Hill's Light Division.
- Maj. Gen. John B. Magruder commanded the divisions of Maj. Gen. Lafayette McLaws, Brig. Gen. David R. Jones, and Magruder's own division, commanded by Brig. Gen. Howell Cobb.
- Maj. Gen. Benjamin Huger's division consisted of the brigades of Brig. Gens. William Mahone, Ambrose R. Wright, Lewis A. Armistead, and Robert Ransom, Jr.
- Maj. Gen. Theophilus H. Holmes' division consisted of the brigades of Brig. Gens. Junius Daniel, John G. Walker, Henry A. Wise, and the cavalry brigade of Brig. Gen. J.E.B. Stuart.

== Battles ==
Overview of the Seven Days Battles

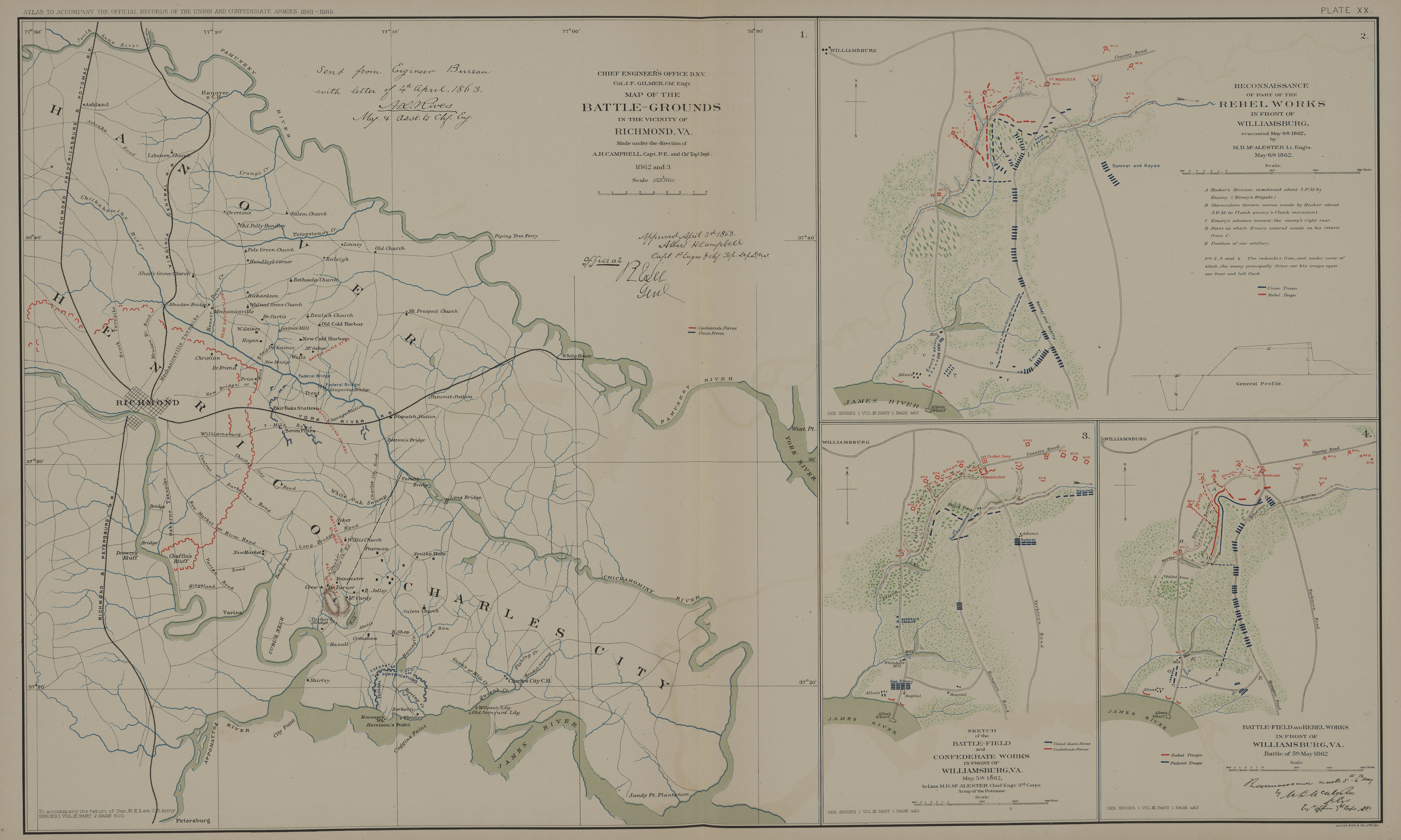
Seven Days Battles: map of events (left side)

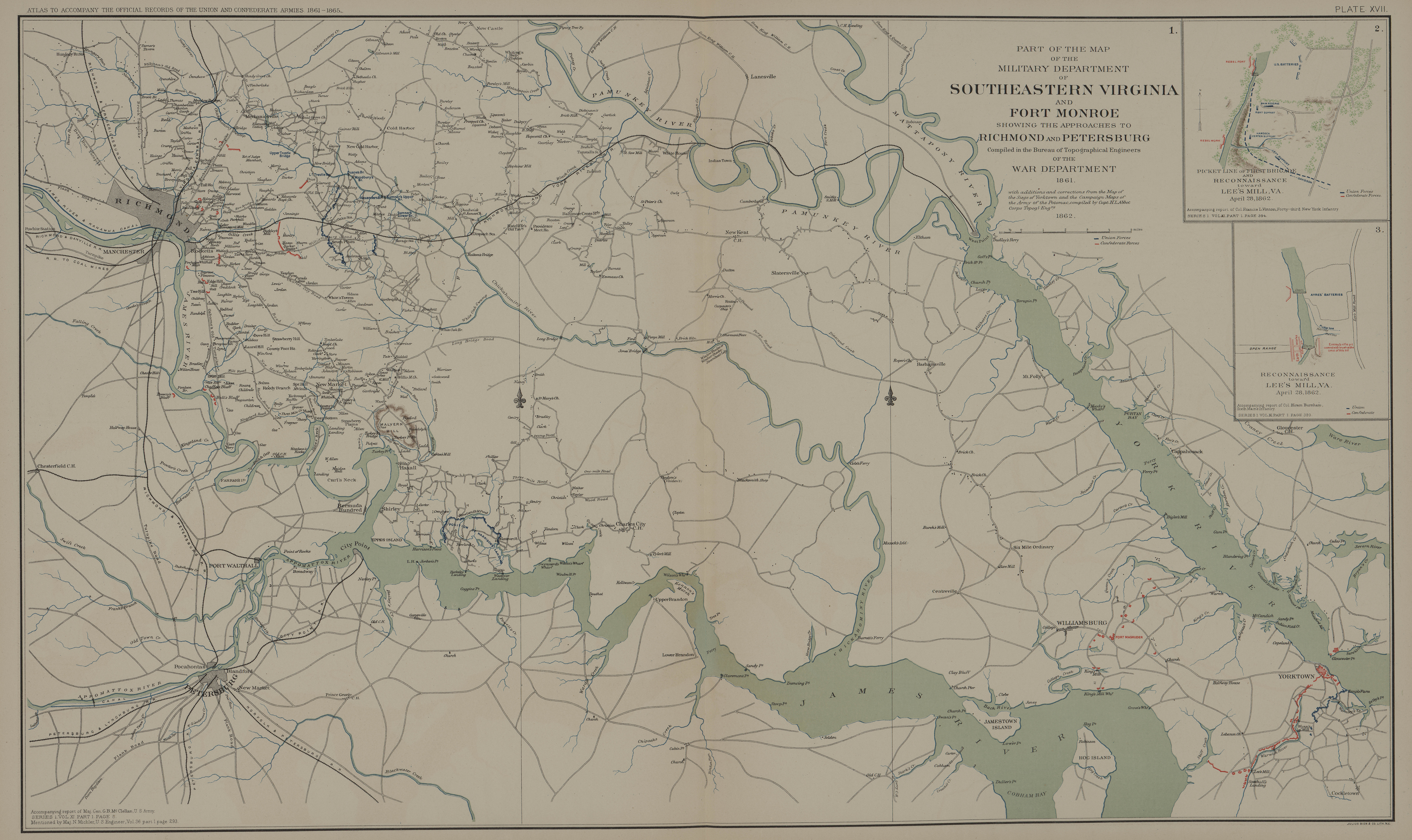
Map of Southeastern Virginia

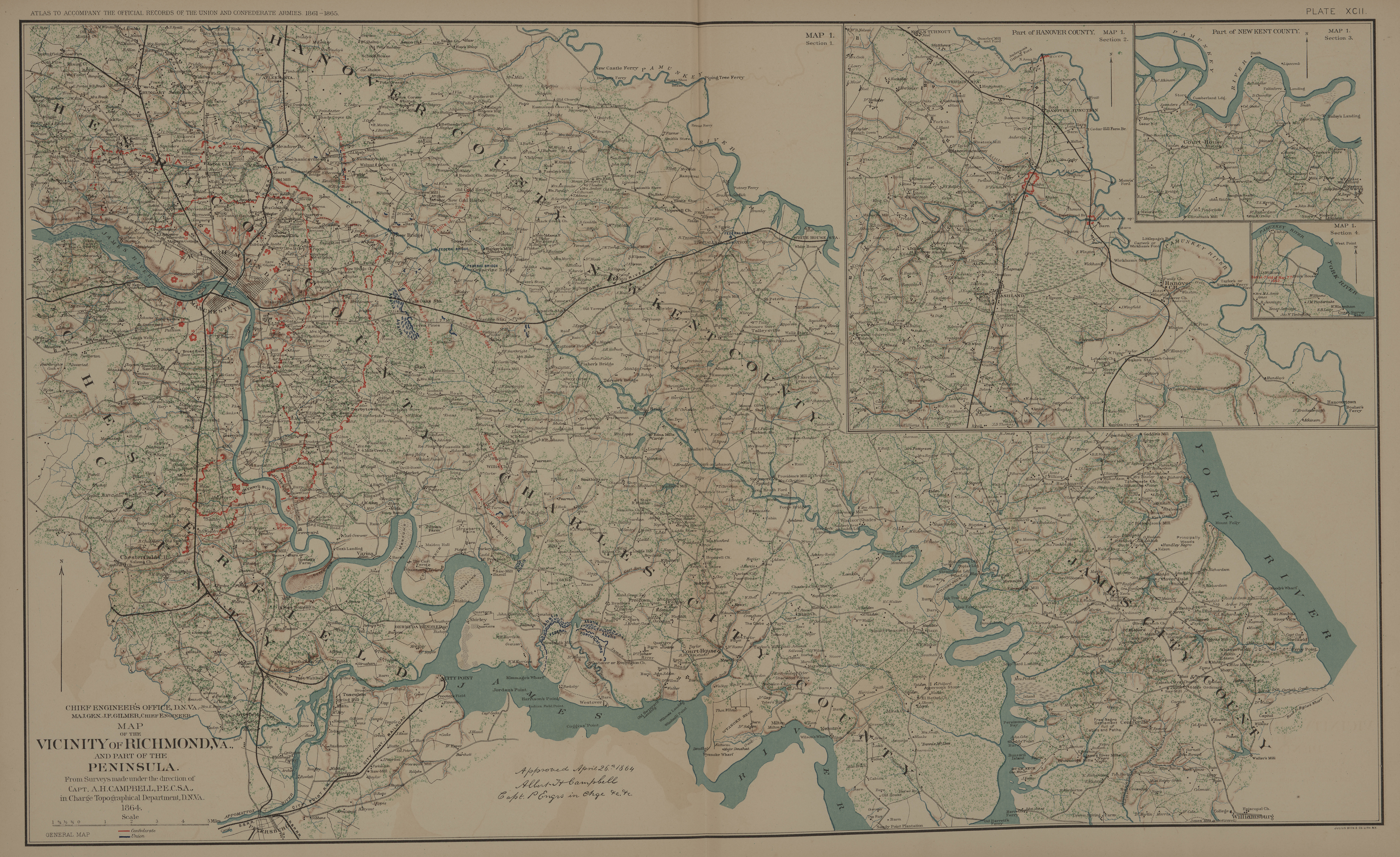
Map of Southeastern Virginia (additional map)

=== Oak Grove ===
McClellan planned to advance to the west, along the axis of the Williamsburg Road, in the direction of Richmond. Between the two armies was a small, dense forest, 1,200 yards (1,100 m) wide, bisected by the headwaters of White Oak Swamp. Two divisions of the III Corps were selected for the assault, commanded by Brig. Gens. Joseph Hooker and Philip Kearny. Facing them was the division of Confederate Maj. Gen. Benjamin Huger.

Soon after 8 a.m., June 25, the Union brigades of Brig. Gens. Daniel E. Sickles (the Excelsior Brigade), Cuvier Grover, both of Hooker's division, and John C. Robinson stepped off. Although Robinson and Grover made good progress on the left and in the center, Sickles's New Yorkers encountered difficulties moving through their abatis, then through the upper portions of the creek, and finally met stiff Confederate resistance, all of which threw the Federal line out of alignment. Huger took advantage of the confusion by launching a counterattack with the brigade of Brig. Gen. Ambrose R. Wright against Grover's brigade. At a crucial moment in the battle, the 26th North Carolina of Brig. Gen. Robert Ransom's brigade, in their first combat engagement, delivered a perfectly synchronized volley of rifle fire against Sickles's brigade, breaking up its delayed attack and sending the 71st New York into a panicked retreat, which Sickles described as "disgraceful confusion."

Heintzelman ordered reinforcements sent forward and also notified army commander McClellan, who was attempting to manage the battle by telegraph from 3 miles (4.8 km) away. McClellan ordered his men to withdraw back to their entrenchments, mystifying his subordinates on the scene. Arriving at the front at 1 p.m., seeing that the situation was not as bad as he had feared, McClellan ordered his men forward to retake the ground for which they had already fought once that day. The fighting lasted until nightfall.

The minor battle was McClellan's only tactical offensive action against Richmond. His attack gained only 600 yards (550 m) at a cost of over 1,000 casualties on both sides and was not strong enough to derail the offensive planned by Robert E. Lee, which had already been set in motion.

=== Beaver Dam Creek (Mechanicsville) ===
Lee's plan called for Jackson to begin the attack on Porter's north flank early on June 26. A.P. Hill's Light Division was to advance from Meadow Bridge when he heard Jackson's guns, clear the Union pickets from Mechanicsville, and then move to Beaver Dam Creek. D.H. Hill and Longstreet were to pass through Mechanicsville and support Jackson and A.P. Hill. South of the river, Magruder and Huger were to demonstrate to deceive the four Union corps on their front.

Lee's intricate plan went awry immediately. Jackson's men, fatigued from their recent campaign and lengthy march, ran at least four hours behind schedule. By 3 p.m., A.P. Hill grew impatient and began his attack without orders, a frontal assault with 11,000 men. Porter extended and strengthened his right flank and fell back to concentrate along Beaver Dam Creek and Ellerson's Mill. There, 14,000 well entrenched soldiers, aided by 32 guns in six batteries, repulsed repeated Confederate attacks with substantial casualties.

This was the first of four occasions within the next seven days when Jackson would fail to display initiative, resourcefulness, or dependability—the very qualities that were later to raise him to the stature of one of the foremost military leaders.

— Col. Vincent J. Esposito, The West Point Atlas of American Wars

Jackson and his command arrived late in the afternoon and he ordered his troops to bivouac for the evening while a major battle was raging within earshot. His proximity to Porter's flank caused McClellan to order Porter to withdraw after dark behind Boatswain's Swamp, 5 miles (8.0 km) to the east. McClellan was concerned that the Confederate buildup on his right flank threatened his supply line, the Richmond and York River Railroad north of the Chickahominy, and he decided to shift his base of supply to the James River. He also believed that the diversions by Huger and Magruder south of the river meant that he was seriously outnumbered. (He reported to Washington that he faced 200,000 Confederates, but there were actually 85,000.) This was a strategic decision of grave importance because it meant that, without the railroad to supply his army, he would be forced to abandon his siege of Richmond. A.P. Hill, then with Longstreet and D.H. Hill behind him, continued his attack, despite orders from Lee to hold his ground. His assault was beaten back with heavy casualties.

Overall, the battle was a Union tactical victory, in which the Confederates suffered significant casualties and achieved none of their specific objectives due to the seriously flawed execution of Lee's plan. Instead of over 60,000 men crushing the enemy's flank, only five brigades, about 15,000 men, had seen action. Their losses were 1,484 versus Porter's 361. Despite the short-term Union success, however, it was the start of a strategic debacle. McClellan began to withdraw his army to the southeast and never regained the initiative.

=== Gaines' Mill ===
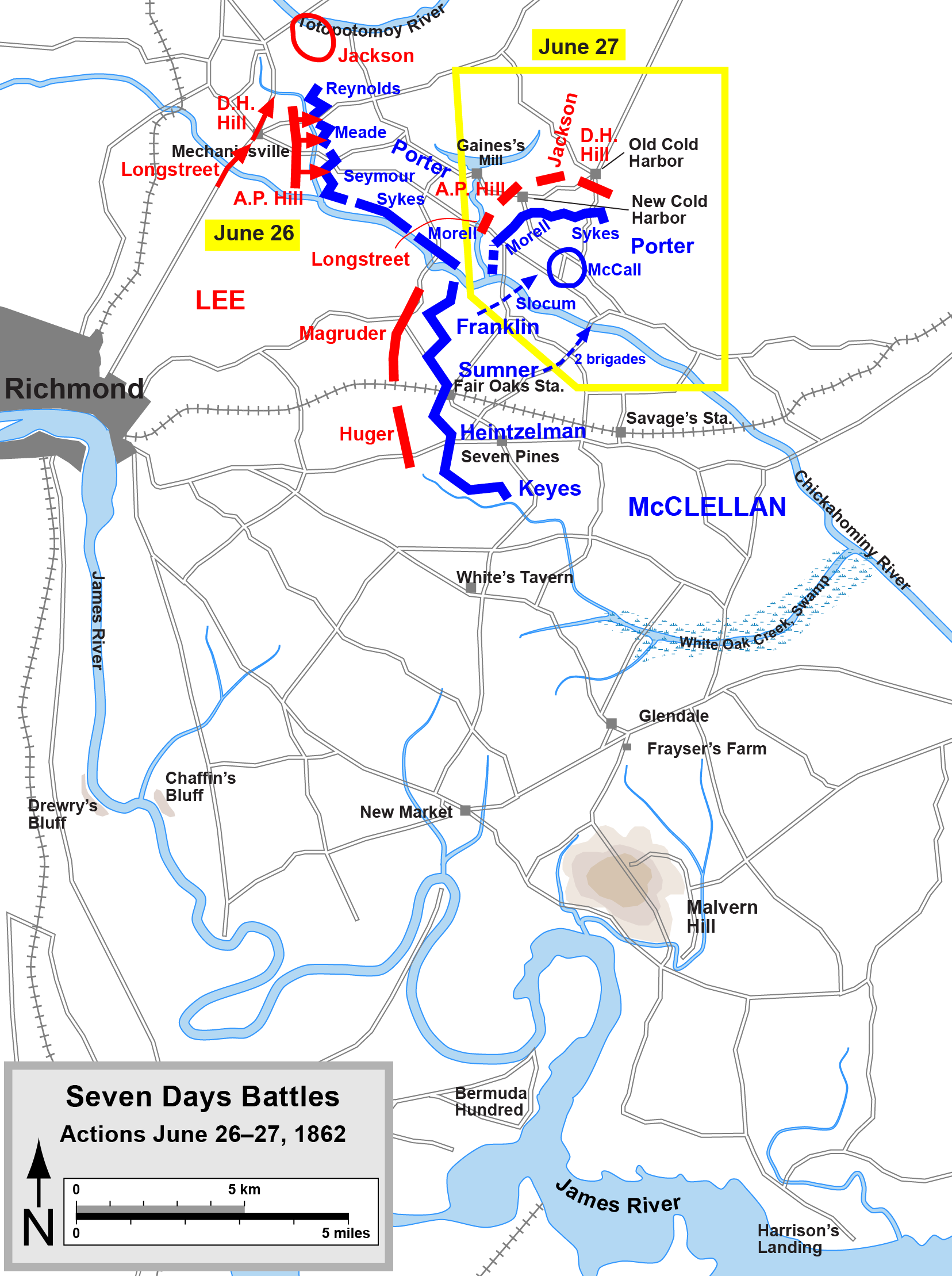
Seven Days Battles, June 26–27, 1862

By the morning of June 27, the Union forces were concentrated into a semicircle with Porter collapsing his line into an east–west salient north of the river and the four corps south of the river remaining in their original positions. McClellan ordered Porter to hold Gaines's Mill at all costs so that the army could change its base of supply to the James River. Several of McClellan's subordinates urged him to attack Magruder's division south of the river, but he feared the vast numbers of Confederates he believed to be before him and refused to capitalize on the overwhelming superiority he actually held on that front.

Lee continued his offensive on June 27, launching the largest Confederate attack of the war, about 57,000 men in six divisions. A.P. Hill resumed his attack across Beaver Dam Creek early in the morning, but found the line lightly defended. By early afternoon, he ran into strong opposition where Porter had deployed along Boatswain's Creek; the swampy terrain was a major obstacle to the attack. As Longstreet arrived to the south of A.P. Hill, he saw the difficulty of attacking over such terrain and delayed until Stonewall Jackson could attack on Hill's left.

For the second time in the Seven Days, however, Jackson was late. D.H. Hill attacked the Federal right and was held off by the division of Brig. Gen. George Sykes; he backed off to await Jackson's arrival. Longstreet was ordered to conduct a diversionary attack to stabilize the lines until Jackson could arrive and attack from the north. In Longstreet's attack, Brig. Gen. George E. Pickett's brigade attempted a frontal assault and was beaten back under severe fire with heavy losses. Jackson finally reached D.H. Hill's position at 3 p.m. and began his assault at 4:30 p.m.

Porter's line was saved by Brig. Gen. Henry W. Slocum's division moving into position to bolster his defense. Shortly after dark, the Confederates mounted another attack, poorly coordinated, but this time collapsing the Federal line. Brig. Gen. John Bell Hood's Texas Brigade opened a gap in the line, as did Pickett's Brigade on its second attempt of the day. By 4 a.m. on June 28, Porter withdrew across the Chickahominy, burning the bridges behind him.

For the second day, Magruder was able to continue fooling McClellan south of the river by employing minor diversionary attacks. He was able to occupy 60,000 Federal troops while the heavier action occurred north of the river.

Gaines's Mill was the only clear-cut Confederate tactical victory of the Peninsula campaign. Union casualties from the 34,214 engaged were 6,837 (894 killed, 3,107 wounded, and 2,836 captured or missing). Of the 57,018 Confederates engaged, losses totaled 7,993 (1,483 killed, 6,402 wounded, 108 missing or captured). Since the Confederate assault was conducted against only a small portion of the Union army (the V Corps, one fifth of the army), the army emerged from the battle in relatively good shape overall. However, although McClellan had already planned to shift his supply base to the James River, his defeat unnerved him and he precipitously decided to abandon his advance on Richmond.

=== Union withdrawal ===
The night of June 27, McClellan ordered his entire army to withdraw to a secure base at Harrison's Landing on the James River. His actions have puzzled military historians ever since. The Union army was in a good position, having withstood strong Confederate attacks while only deploying one of its five corps in battle. Porter had performed well against heavy odds. Furthermore, McClellan was aware that the War Department had created a new Army of Virginia and ordered it to be sent to the Peninsula to reinforce him. But Lee had unnerved him, and he surrendered the initiative. He sent a telegram to the Secretary of War that included the statement: "If I save this Army now I tell you plainly that I owe no thanks to you or any other persons in Washington—you have done your best to sacrifice this Army." (The military telegraph department chose to omit this sentence from the copy given to the Secretary.)

McClellan ordered Keyes's IV Corps to move west of Glendale and protect the army's withdrawal, while Porter was sent to the high ground at Malvern Hill to develop defensive positions. The supply trains were ordered to move south toward the river. McClellan departed for Harrison's Landing without specifying any exact routes of withdrawal and without designating a second-in-command. For the remainder of the Seven Days, he had no direct command of the battles. The Union retreat across the Chickahominy after Gaines's Mill was a psychological victory for the Confederacy, signaling that Richmond was out of danger.

Lee's cavalry reported that Union troops had abandoned their defense of the Richmond and York River Railroad and the White House supply depot on the York River. That information, plus the sighting of large dust clouds south of the Chickahominy River, finally convinced Lee that McClellan was heading for the James. Until this time, Lee anticipated that McClellan would be withdrawing to the east to protect his supply line to the York River and positioned his forces to react to that, unable to act decisively while he awaited evidence of McClellan's intentions.

=== Garnett's & Golding's Farm ===
While Lee's main attack at Gaines's Mill was progressing on June 27, the Confederates south of the Chickahominy performed a reconnaissance in force to determine the location of McClellan's retreating army. Magruder ordered Brig. Gen. Robert A. Toombs's brigade forward to "feel the enemy." Toombs, a Georgia politician with a disdain for professional officers, instead launched a sharp attack at dusk against Baldy Smith's VI Corps division near Old Tavern at the farm of James M. Garnett. The attack was easily repulsed by the brigade of Brig. Gen. Winfield S. Hancock.

On June 28, Toombs again was ordered to conduct a reconnaissance, but turned it into an attack over the same ground, meeting the enemy at the farm of Simon Gouldin (also known as Golding). Toombs took it upon himself to order his fellow brigade commander, Col. George T. Anderson, to join the assault. Two of Anderson's regiments, the 7th and 8th Georgia, preceded Toombs's brigade into the assault and were subjected to a vigorous Federal counterattack by the 49th Pennsylvania and 43rd New York, losing 156 men.

These were the only attacks south of the Chickahominy River in conjunction with Gaines's Mill, but they helped to convince McClellan that he was being subjected to attacks from all directions, increasing his anxiety and his determination to get his army to safety at the James.

=== Savage's Station ===
On Sunday, June 29, the bulk of McClellan's army concentrated around Savage's Station on the Richmond and York River Railroad, a Federal supply depot since just before Seven Pines, preparing for a difficult crossing through and around White Oak Swamp. It did so without centralized direction because McClellan had personally moved south of Malvern Hill after Gaines's Mill without leaving directions for corps movements during the retreat nor naming a second in command. Clouds of black smoke filled the air as the Union troops were ordered to burn anything they could not carry. Union morale plummeted, particularly so for those wounded, who realized that they were not being evacuated from Savage's Station with the rest of the Army.

Lee devised a complex plan to pursue and destroy McClellan's army. Longstreet's and A.P. Hill's divisions looped back toward Richmond and then southeast to the crossroads at Glendale, Holmes's division headed farther south, to the vicinity of Malvern Hill, and Magruder's division was ordered to move due east to attack the Federal rear guard. Stonewall Jackson, commanding three divisions, was to rebuild a bridge over the Chickahominy and head due south to Savage's Station, where he would link up with Magruder and deliver a strong blow that might cause the Union army to turn around and fight during its retreat. McClellan's rear guard at Savage's Station consisted five divisions from Sumner's II Corps, Heintzelman's III Corps, and Franklin's VI Corps. McClellan considered his senior corps commander, Sumner, to be incompetent, so he appointed no one to command the rear guard.

Initial contact between the armies occurred at 9 a.m. on June 29, a four-regiment fight about 2 miles (3.2 km) west of Savage's Station, lasting for about two hours before disengaging. Meanwhile, Jackson was not advancing as Lee had planned. He was taking time to rebuild bridges over the Chickahominy and he received a garbled order from Lee's chief of staff that made him believe he should stay north of the river and guard the crossings. These failures of the Confederate plan were being matched on the Union side, however. Heintzelman decided on his own that his corps was not needed to defend Savage's Station, so he decided to follow the rest of the army without informing his fellow generals.

Magruder was faced with the problem of attacking Sumner's 26,600 men with his own 14,000. He hesitated until 5 p.m., when he sent only two and a half brigades forward. Union artillery opened fire and pickets were sent forward to meet the assault. The two brigade front of Kershaw and Semmes began to push the narrow defensive line of one of Sedgwick's brigades. Sumner managed this part of the battle erratically, selecting regiments for combat from multiple brigades almost at random. By the time all of these units reached the front, the two sides were at rough parity—two brigades each. Although Magruder had been conservative about his attack, Sumner was even more so. Of the 26 regiments he had in his corps, only 10 were engaged at Savage's Station.

The fighting turned into a bloody stalemate as darkness fell and strong thunderstorms began to move in. The "Land Merrimack"—the first instance of an armored railroad battery to be used in combat—bombarded the Union front, with some of its shells reaching as far to the rear as the field hospital. The final action of the evening was as the Vermont Brigade, attempting to hold the flank south of the Williamsburg Road, charged into the woods and were met with murderous fire, suffering more casualties of any brigade on the field that day.

There were about 1,500 casualties on both sides, plus 2,500 previously wounded Union soldiers who were left to be captured when their field hospital was evacuated. Stonewall Jackson eventually crossed the river by about 2:30 a.m. on June 30, but it was too late to crush the Union army, as Lee had hoped. General Lee reprimanded Magruder, but the fault for the lost opportunity must be shared equally with the poor staff work at Lee's own headquarters and a less than aggressive performance by Jackson.

=== Glendale and White Oak Swamp ===
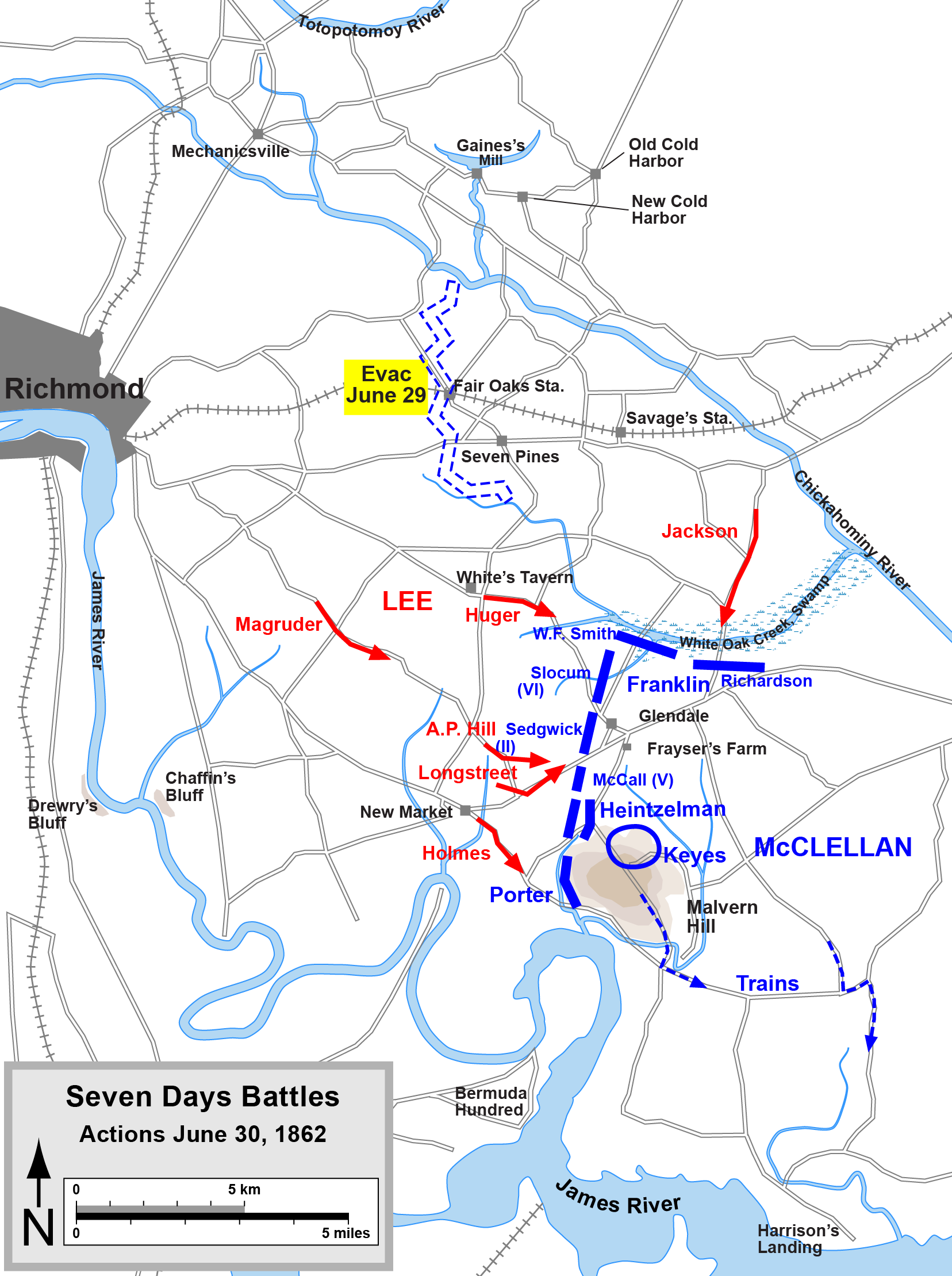
Seven Days Battles, June 30, 1862

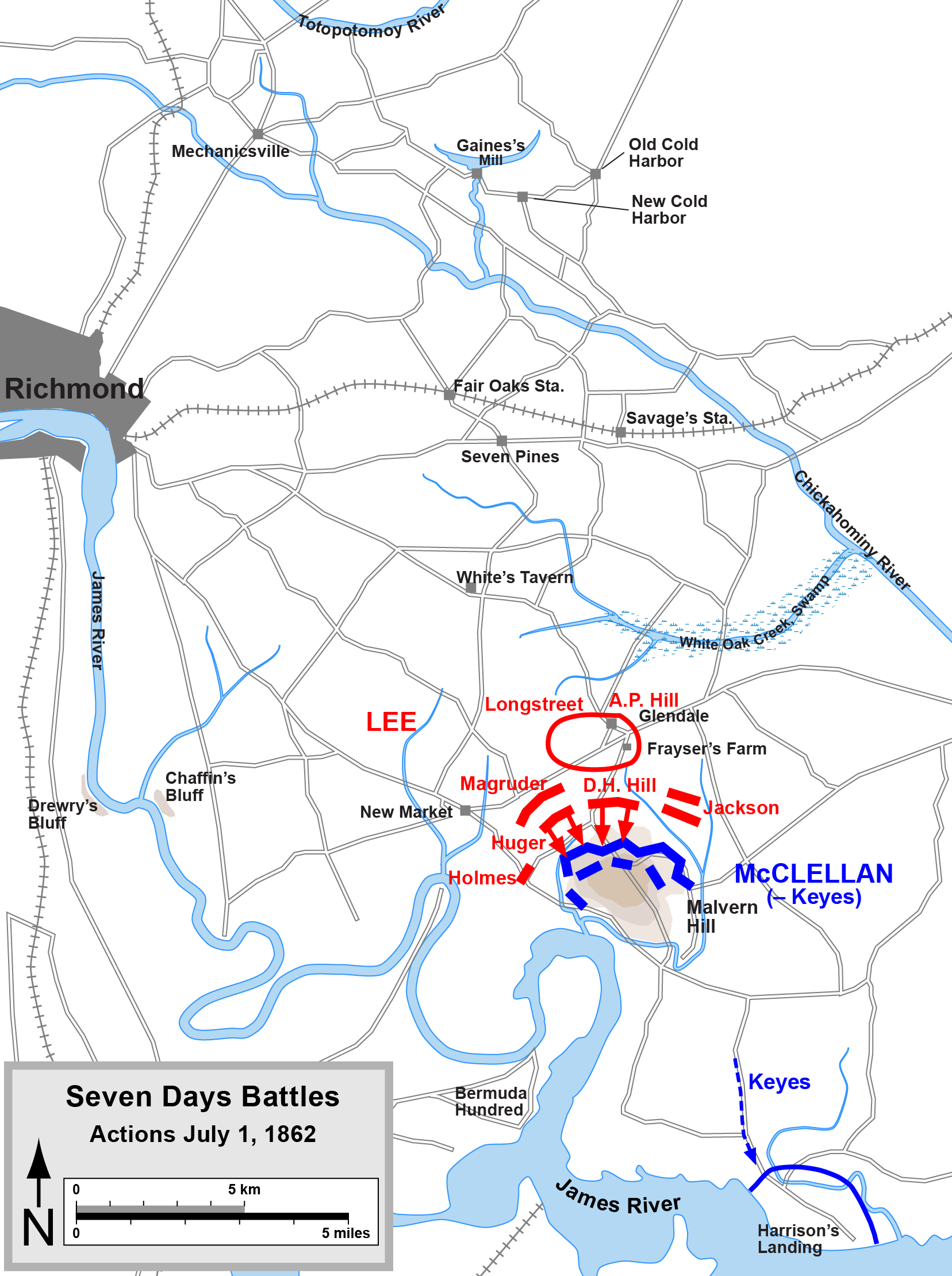
Seven Days Battles, July 1, 1862

Most elements of the Union army had been able to cross White Oak Swamp Creek by noon on June 30. About one third of the army had reached the James River, but the remainder was still marching between White Oak Swamp and Glendale. After inspecting the line of march that morning, McClellan rode south and boarded the ironclad USS Galena on the James.

Lee ordered his army to converge on the retreating Union forces, bottlenecked on the inadequate road network. The Army of the Potomac, lacking overall command coherence, presented a discontinuous, ragged defensive line. Stonewall Jackson was ordered to press the Union rear guard at the White Oak Swamp crossing while the largest part of Lee's army, some 45,000 men, would attack the Army of the Potomac in mid-retreat at Glendale, about 2 miles (3.2 km) southwest, splitting it in two. Huger's division would strike first after a three-mile (5 km) march on the Charles City Road, supported by Longstreet and A.P. Hill, whose divisions were about 7 miles (11 km) to the west, in a mass attack. Holmes was ordered to capture Malvern Hill.

The Confederate plan was once again marred by poor execution. Huger's men were slowed by felled trees obstructing the Charles City Road, spending hours chopping a new road through the thick woods. Huger failed to take any alternative route, and, fearing a counterattack, failed to participate in the battle. Magruder marched around aimlessly, unable to decide whether he should be aiding Longstreet or Holmes; by 4 p.m., Lee ordered Magruder to join Holmes on the River Road and attack Malvern Hill. Stonewall Jackson moved slowly and spent the entire day north of the creek, making only feeble efforts to cross and attack Franklin's VI Corps in the Battle of White Oak Swamp, attempting to rebuild a destroyed bridge (although adequate fords were nearby), and engaging in a pointless artillery duel. Jackson's inaction allowed some units to be detached from Franklin's corps in late afternoon to reinforce the Union troops at Glendale. Holmes's relatively inexperienced troops made no progress against Porter at Turkey Bridge on Malvern Hill, even with the reinforcements from Magruder, and were repulsed by effective artillery fire and by Federal gunboats on the James.

At 2 p.m., as they waited for sounds of Huger's expected attack, Lee, Longstreet, and visiting Confederate President Jefferson Davis were conferring on horseback when they came under heavy artillery fire, wounding two men and killing three horses. A.P. Hill, the commander in that sector, ordered the president and senior generals to the rear. Longstreet attempted to silence the six batteries of Federal guns firing in his direction, but long-range artillery fire proved to be inadequate. He ordered Col. Micah Jenkins to charge the batteries, which brought on a general fight around 4 p.m.

Although belated and not initiated as planned, the assaults by the divisions of A.P. Hill and Longstreet, under Longstreet's overall command, turned out to be the only ones to follow Lee's order to attack the main Union concentration. Longstreet's 20,000 men were not reinforced by other Confederate divisions of Huger and Jackson, despite their concentration within a three-mile (5 km) radius. They assaulted the disjointed Union line of 40,000 men, arranged in a two-mile (3 km) arc north and south of the Glendale intersection, but the brunt of the fighting was centered on the position held by the Pennsylvania Reserves division of the V Corps, 6,000 men under Brig. Gen. George A. McCall, just west of the Nelson Farm. (The farm was owned by R.H. Nelson, but its former owner was named Frayser and many of the locals referred to it as Frayser's, or Frazier's, Farm.)

Three Confederate brigades made the assault, but Longstreet ordered them forward in a piecemeal fashion, over several hours. Brig. Gen. James L. Kemper's Virginians charged through the thick woods first and emerged in front of five batteries of McCall's artillery. In their first combat experience, the brigade conducted a disorderly but enthusiastic assault, which carried them through the guns and broke through McCall's main line with Jenkins's support, followed up a few hours later by Brig. Gen. Cadmus M. Wilcox's Alabamians. The Confederate brigades met stiff resistance in sometimes hand-to-hand combat.

On McCall's flanks, the divisions of Brig. Gen. Joseph Hooker (to the south) and Brig. Gens. Philip Kearny and Henry W. Slocum (to the north), held against repeated Confederate attacks. Brig. Gen. John Sedgwick's division, which had units both in reserve and around White Oak Swamp, came up to fill a gap after a brutal counterattack. Heavy fighting continued until about 8:30 p.m. Longstreet committed virtually every brigade in the divisions under his command, while on the Union side they had been fed in individually to plug holes in the line as they occurred.

The battle was tactically inconclusive, although Lee failed to achieve his objective of preventing the Federal escape and crippling McClellan's army, if not destroying it. Union casualties were 3,797, Confederate about the same at 3,673, but more than 40% higher in killed and wounded. Although Jackson's wing of the army and Franklin's corps comprised tens of thousands of men, the action at White Oak Swamp included no infantry activity and was limited to primarily an artillery duel with few casualties.

=== Malvern Hill ===
The final battle of the Seven Days was the first in which the Union army occupied favorable ground. Malvern Hill offered good observation and artillery positions, having been prepared the previous day by Porter's V Corps. McClellan himself was not present on the battlefield, having preceded his army to Harrison's Landing on the James, and Porter was the most senior of the corps commanders. The slopes were cleared of timber, providing great visibility, and the open fields to the north could be swept by deadly fire from the 250 guns placed by Col. Henry J. Hunt, McClellan's chief of artillery. Beyond this space, the terrain was swampy and thickly wooded. Almost the entire Army of the Potomac occupied the hill and the line extended in a vast semicircle from Harrison's Landing on the extreme right to Brig. Gen. George W. Morell's division of Porter's corps on the extreme left, which occupied the geographically advantageous ground on the northwestern slopes of the hill.

Rather than flanking the position, Lee attacked it directly, hoping that his artillery would clear the way for a successful infantry assault. His plan was to attack the hill from the north on the Quaker Road, using the divisions of Stonewall Jackson, Richard S. Ewell, D.H. Hill, and Brig. Gen. William H.C. Whiting. Magruder was ordered to follow Jackson and deploy to his right when he reached the battlefield. Huger's division was to follow as well, but Lee reserved the right to position him based on developments. The divisions of Longstreet and A.P. Hill, which had been the most heavily engaged in Glendale the previous day, were held in reserve.

Once again, Lee's complex plan was poorly executed. The approaching soldiers were delayed by severely muddy roads and poor maps. Jackson arrived at the swampy creek called Western Run and stopped abruptly. Magruder's guides mistakenly sent him on the Long Bridge Road to the southwest, away from the battlefield. Eventually the battle line was assembled with Huger's division (brigades of Brig. Gens. Ambrose R. Wright and Lewis A. Armistead) on the Confederate right and D.H. Hill's division (brigades of Brig. Gen. John Bell Hood and Col. Evander M. Law) on the Quaker Road to the left. They awaited the Confederate bombardment before attacking.

Unfortunately for Lee, Henry Hunt struck first, launching one of the greatest artillery barrages in the war from 1 p.m. to 2:30 p.m. The Union gunners had superior equipment and expertise and disabled most of the Confederate batteries. Despite the setback, Lee sent his infantry forward at 3:30 p.m. and Armistead's brigade made some progress through lines of Union sharpshooters. By 4 p.m., Magruder arrived and he was ordered forward to support Armistead. His attack was piecemeal and poorly organized. Meanwhile, D. H. Hill launched his division forward along the Quaker Road, past Willis Church. Across the entire line of battle, the Confederate troops reached only within 200 yards (180 m) of the Union Center and were repulsed by nightfall with heavy losses. Maj. Gen. D.H. Hill is quoted as saying that, "It wasn't war, it was murder."

Lee's army suffered 5,355 casualties (versus 3,214 Union) in this wasted effort, but continued to follow the Union army all the way to Harrison's Landing. On Evelington Heights, part of the property of Edmund Ruffin, the Confederates had an opportunity to dominate the Union camps, making their position on the bank of the James potentially untenable; although the Confederate position would be subjected to Union naval gunfire, the heights were an exceptionally strong defensive position that would have been very difficult for the Union to capture with infantry. Cavalry commander Jeb Stuart reached the heights and began bombardment with a single cannon. This alerted the Federals to the potential danger and they captured the heights before any Confederate infantry could reach the scene.

== Aftermath ==
Our success has not been as great or complete as we should have desired. ... Under ordinary circumstances the Federal Army should have been destroyed.

— General Robert E. Lee

My conscience is clear at least to this extent—viz.: that I have honestly done the best I could; I shall leave it to others to decide whether that was the best that could have been done—& if they find any who can do better am perfectly willing to step aside & give way.

— Maj. Gen. George B. McClellan, letter to his wife

The Seven Days Battles ended the Peninsula campaign. Malvern Hill was not a tenable position in which to stay, and the Army of the Potomac quickly withdrew to Harrison's Landing, where it was protected by Union gunboats on the James River. The army was in no condition for a renewed offensive; nearly 16,000 men and officers had been killed, wounded, or captured between June 25 and July 1, particularly in the V Corps, which had done the heaviest fighting. Also, the survivors were extremely tired after a week of fighting and marching with little food or sleep, most of the artillery ammunition had been used up, and the summer weather was taking its toll with the army sick lists getting longer and longer. Meanwhile, the equally exhausted Army of Northern Virginia, with no reason to remain in the James bottomlands, pulled back to the Richmond lines to lick its wounds.

McClellan wrote a series of letters to the War Department to argue that he was facing upwards of 200,000 Confederates and that he needed major reinforcements to launch a renewed offensive on Richmond. McPherson notes that the maximum number of Army of Northern Virginia troops that Lee could bring was in fact 92,000. McClellan argued that by giving him the commands in Northern Virginia, troops from the Washington garrison, and whatever forces could be pulled from the West, he might have a fighting chance.

Both sides suffered heavy casualties. Lee's Army of Northern Virginia suffered about 20,000 casualties (3,494 killed, 15,758 wounded, and 952 captured or missing) out of a total of over 90,000 soldiers during the Seven Days. McClellan reported casualties of about 16,000 (1,734 killed, 8,062 wounded, and 6,053 captured or missing) out of a total of 105,445. Despite their victory, many Confederates were stunned by the losses. The number of casualties in the Seven Days Battles surpassed the total number of casualties in the Western Theater of the war until that point in the year.

The effects of the Seven Days Battles were widespread. After a successful start on the Peninsula, which foretold an early end to the war, Northern morale was crushed by McClellan's retreat. Despite heavy casualties, which the less populated South could ill afford, and clumsy tactical performances by Lee and his generals, Confederate morale skyrocketed, and Lee was emboldened to continue his aggressive strategy through the Second Battle of Bull Run and the Maryland Campaign. McClellan's previous position as general-in-chief of all the Union armies, which had been vacant since March, was filled on July 23, 1862, by Major General Henry W. Halleck, but McClellan retained command of the Army of the Potomac. Meanwhile, Robert E. Lee embarked on a thorough reorganization of the Army of Northern Virginia by forming it into two corps, commanded by James Longstreet and Stonewall Jackson. Lee also removed several generals, such as John Magruder and Benjamin Huger, who had performed poorly during the Seven Days Battles.

== See also ==
- Armies in the American Civil War
- List of costliest American Civil War land battles
- Troop engagements of the American Civil War, 1862
