= Don White (racing driver) =

American racing driver (1928–2016)

- Born: Donald O. H. White; June 24, 1928 Monmouth, Illinois, U.S.
- Died: April 29, 2016 (aged 87) Keokuk, Iowa, U.S.

Championship titles
- USAC Stock Car (1963, 1967); IMCA Stock Car (1954, 1955, 1958)

AAA/USAC Stock Car career
- Years active: 1956–1957, 1960–1981, 1983
- Championships: 2
- Best finish: 1st in 1963, 1967

NASCAR Cup Series career
- 24 races run over 9 years
- Best finish: 79th (1955)
- First race: 1954 Race 2 (Daytona Beach)
- Last race: 1972 Miller High Life 500 (Ontario)
Wins	Top tens	Poles
0	12	0

Donald O. H. White (June 24, 1928 – April 29, 2016) was an American racing driver known for his stock car career. He is best known for competing in United States Auto Club (USAC) sanctioned events; during the 1960s, White was twice the USAC Stock Car National Champion. He retired as the series' winningest driver.

White had 24 starts in the NASCAR Grand National / Winston Cup series between 1954 and 1972 with 12 top-ten and seven top-five finishes. Earlier in his career, White won three IMCA Stock Car championships: 1954, 1955 and 1958.

== Driving career ==
White started his first national race in 1949. This IMCA race happened at Cedar Rapids, Iowa; he was second place before retiring because of mechanical problems. White won IMCA championships in 1954, 1955, and 1958. By the time that he ended IMCA racing in 1958, he had won at every track on the circuit. White's biggest competitor in IMCA was his brother-in-law Ernie Derr.

White moved to the USAC Stock Car series in 1959. His national racing career ended at a USAC Stock Car race at Milwaukee on August 28, 1983.

White won the most races in USAC Stock Car history. He had 53 wins and A. J. Foyt was second with 41. In a mid-2015 interview for the Automobile Racing Club of America (ARCA) website, White said "I think I liked Milwaukee as well as any place. Won 14 or 15 there, so I'd say that was my favorite. The Milwaukee Journal Sentinel cited in his obituary that he was the winningest driver in major races at the track.

== Death ==
White died on April 29, 2016 at age 89. Foyt reacted to his death by saying, "Don White was a good racer, real fair because he never did anything dirty, and real smooth. He always had beautiful equipment and his cars handled real well. He was a super guy."

== Awards and honors ==
White has been inducted into the following halls of fame:

- United States Auto Club (USAC) Hall of Fame (2013)
- Iowa Racing Museum Hall of Fame (2018)

Sporting positions
Preceded by Paul Goldsmith	USAC Stock Car Champion; 1963	Succeeded by Parnelli Jones
Preceded by Norm Nelson	USAC Stock Car Champion; 1967	Succeeded by A. J. Foyt
