= Keokuk, Iowa =

- City
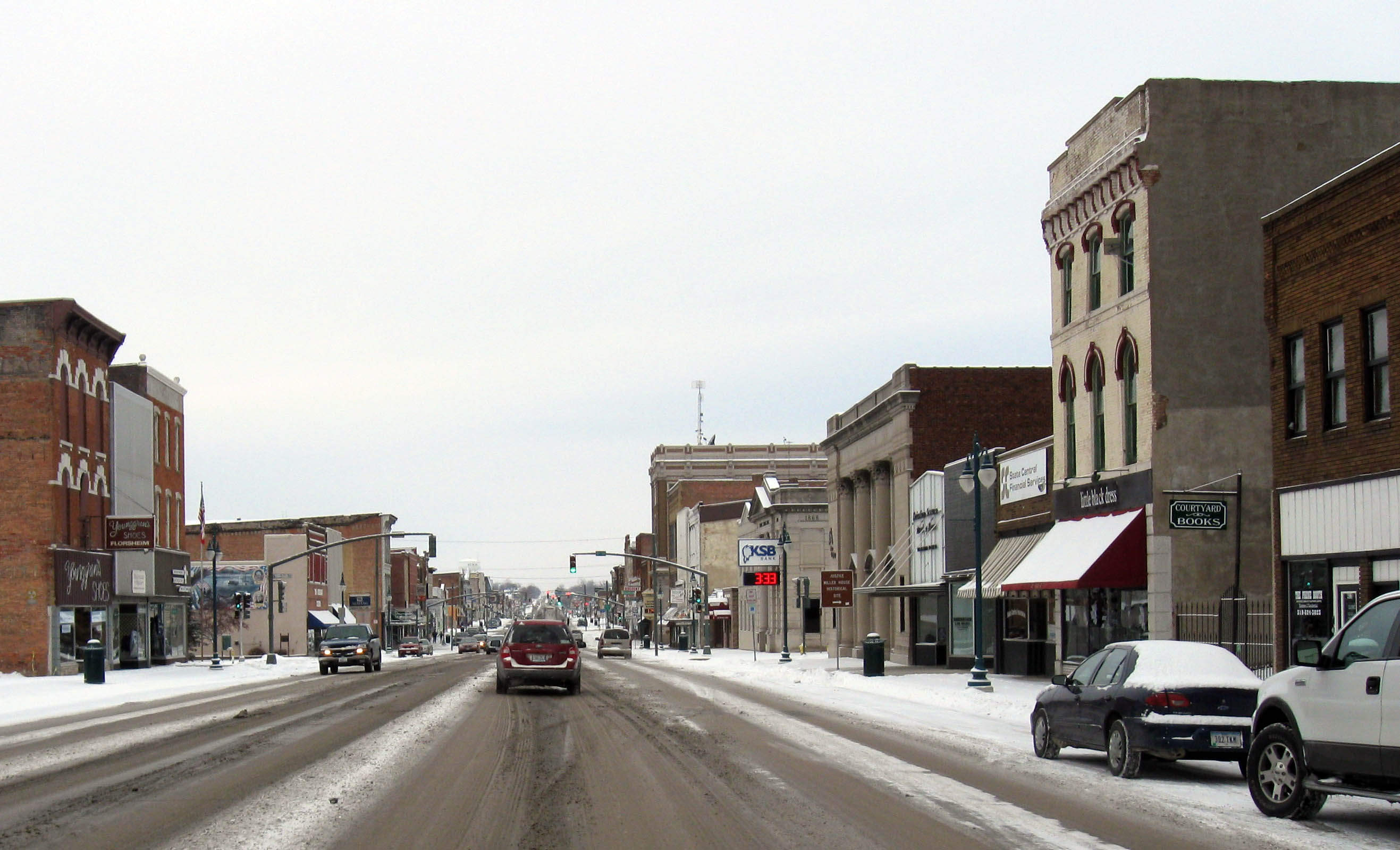
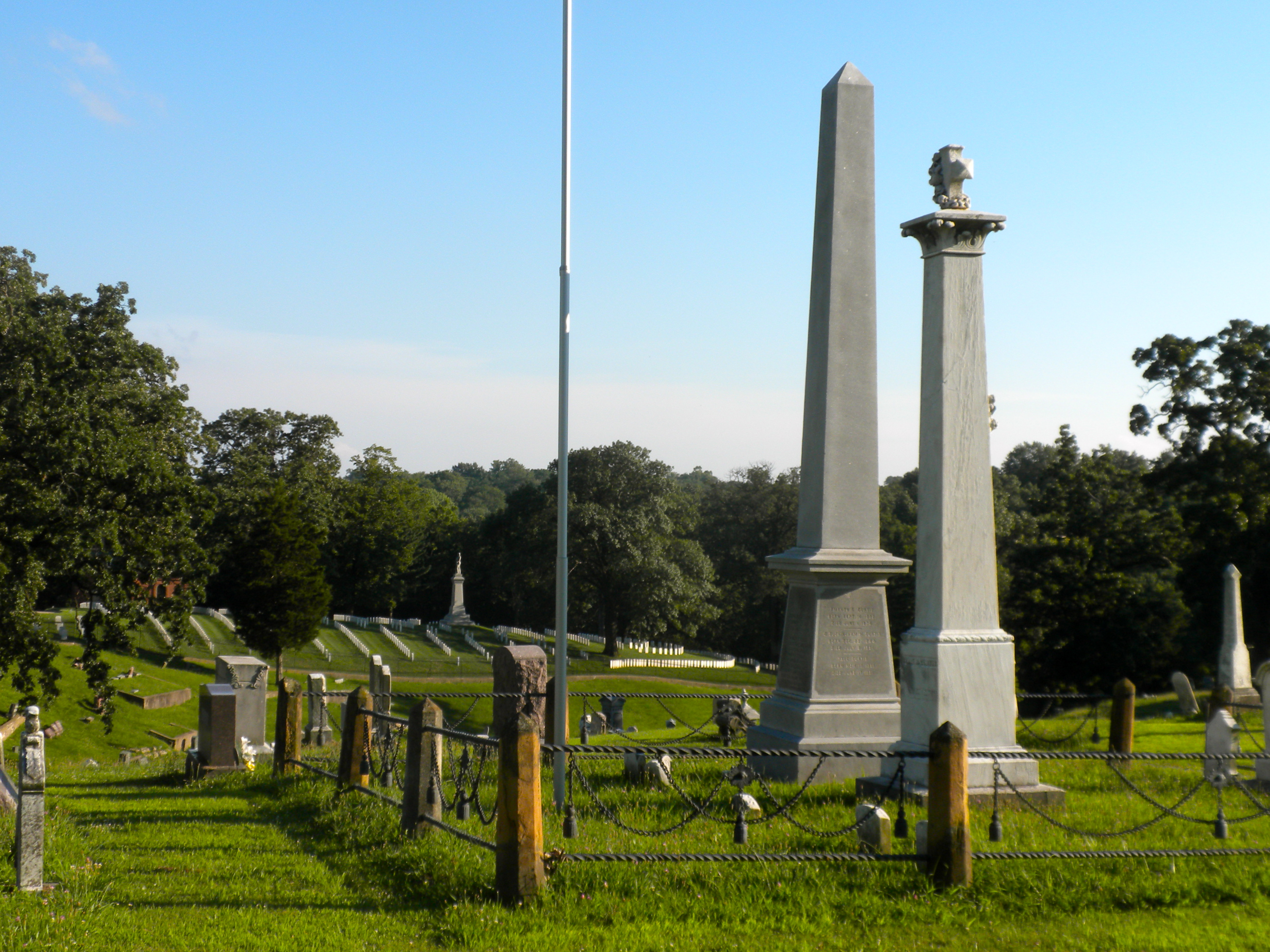
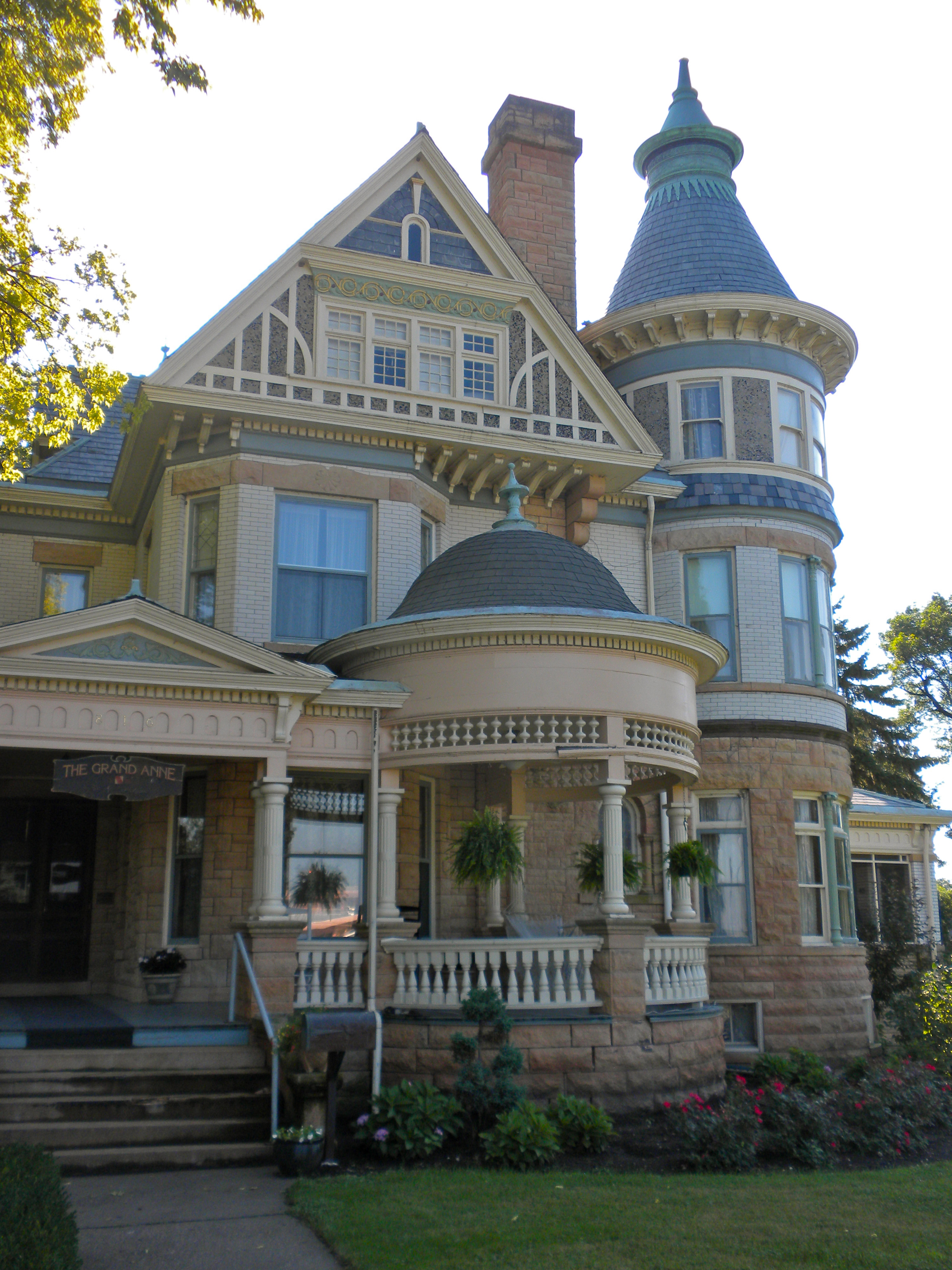
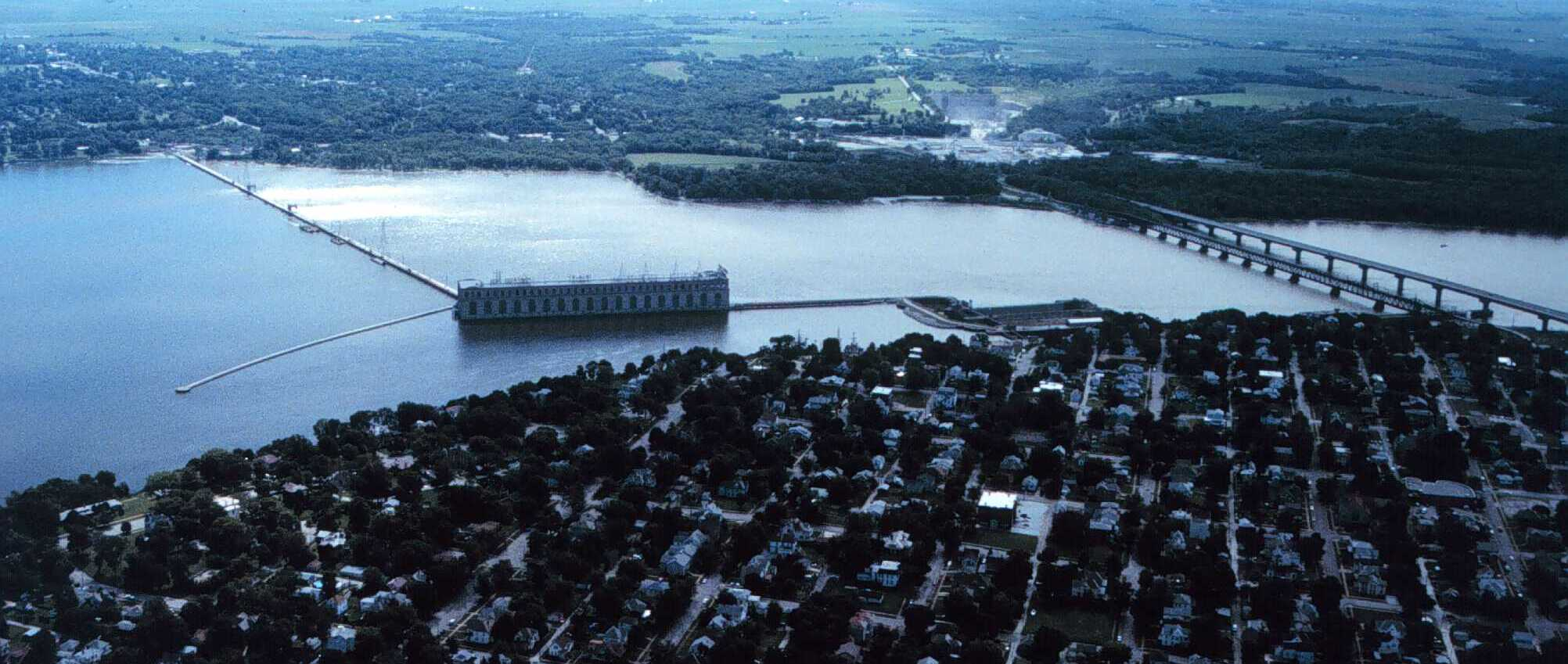
- Downtown Keokuk Keokuk National Cemetery C. R. Joy House Mississippi River and Lock and Dam No. 19

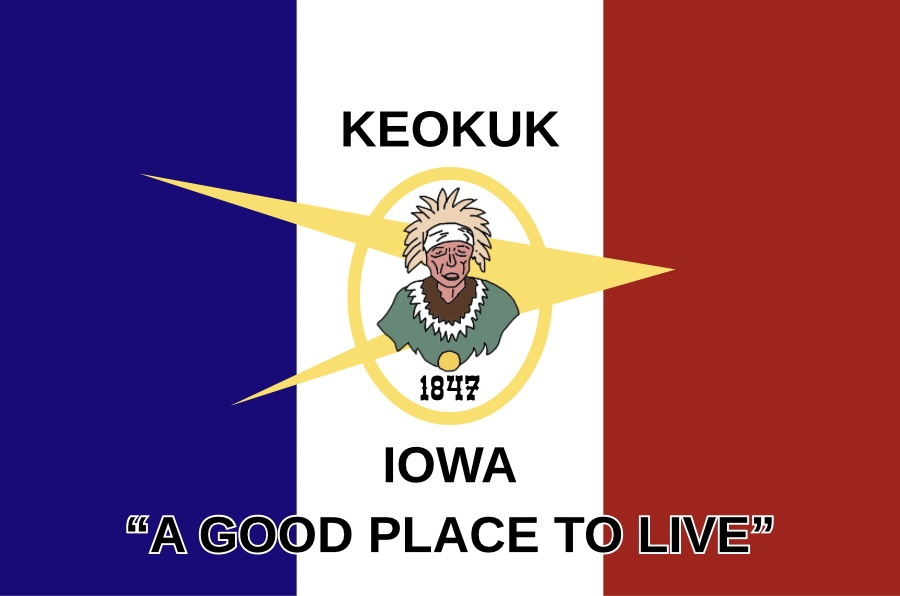
- Flag
- Nicknames: "The Gate City", "Power City", "Geode Capital of The World"
- Location within Lee County and Iowa
- Coordinates: 40°24′30″N 91°23′16″W
- Country: United States
- State: Iowa
- County: Lee
- Founded: 1832
- Incorporated: December 13, 1848

Government
  - Type: Mayor–council government
  - Mayor: Kathie Mahoney

Area
  - Total: 10.55 sq mi (27.32 km^{2})
  - Land: 9.10 sq mi (23.57 km^{2})
  - Water: 1.45 sq mi (3.75 km^{2})
- Elevation: 653 ft (199 m)

Population (2020)
  - Total: 9,900
  - Estimate (July 1, 2023): ▼9,513
  - Density: 1,088.0/sq mi (420.08/km^{2})
- Time zone: UTC−6 (Central (CST))
  - Summer (DST): UTC−5 (CDT)
- ZIP Code: 52632
- Area code: 319
- FIPS code: 19-40845
- GNIS feature ID: 468166
- Website: cityofkeokuk.org

Keokuk (/ˈkiːəkʌk/) is a city in and a county seat of Lee County, Iowa, United States. It is Iowa's southernmost city. The population was 9,900 at the time of the 2020 census. The city is named after the Sauk chief Keokuk. It is in the extreme southeast corner of Iowa, where the Des Moines River meets the Mississippi. Keokuk is also the home of Keokuk National Cemetery.

It is at the junction of U.S. Routes 61, 136 and 218. Just across the rivers are the towns of Hamilton and Warsaw, Illinois, and Alexandria, Missouri. Keokuk, along with the city of Fort Madison, is a principal city of the Fort Madison-Keokuk micropolitan area, which includes all of Lee County, Iowa, Hancock County, Illinois and Clark County, Missouri.

== History ==
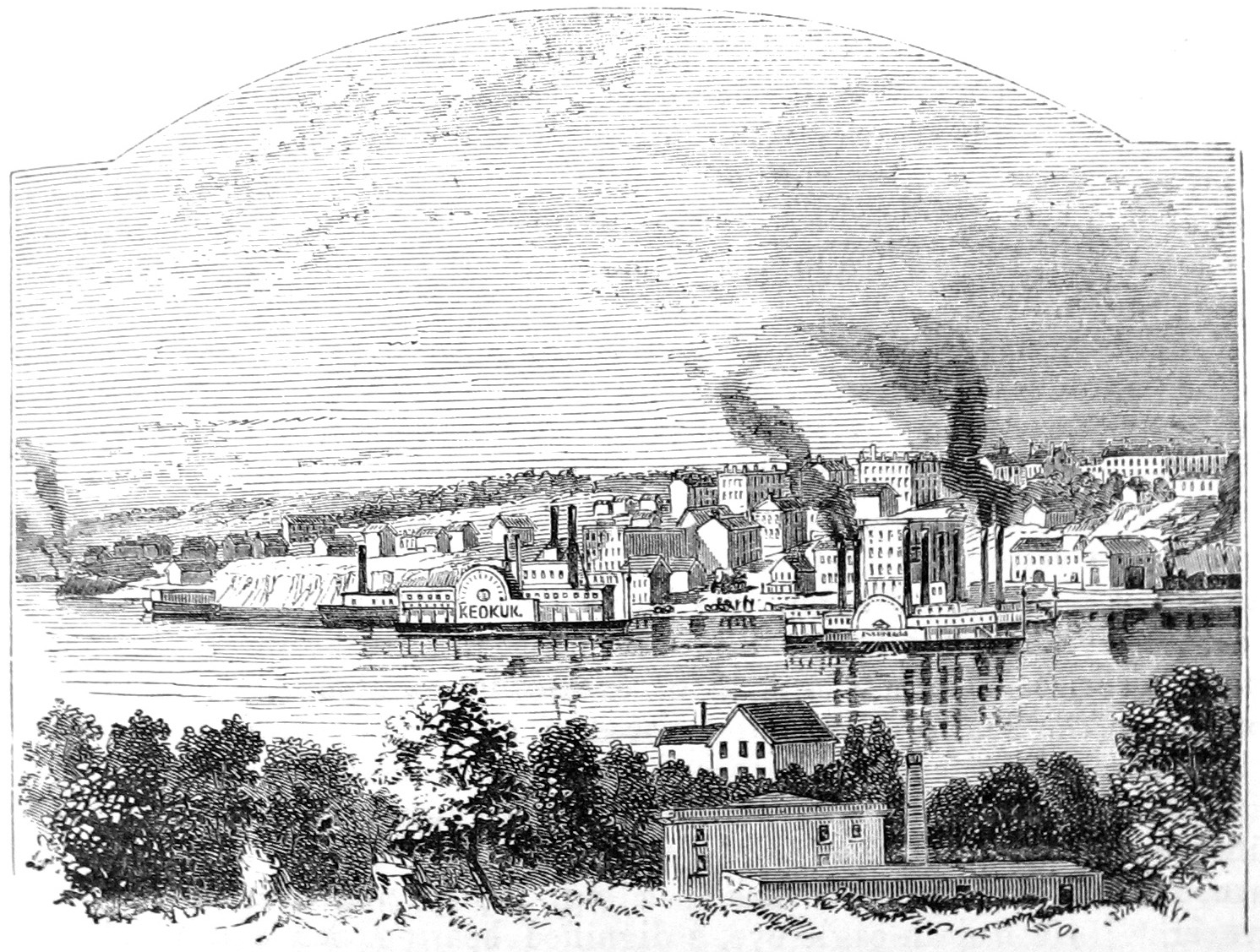
Keokuk in 1865.

Situated between the Des Moines and Mississippi rivers, the area that became Keokuk had access to a large trading area and was an ideal location for settlers. In 1820, the US Army prohibited soldiers stationed along the Mississippi River from having wives who were Native American. Dr. Samuel C. Muir, a surgeon stationed at Fort Edwards (near present-day Warsaw, Illinois), resigned his commission rather than leave his Indian wife and crossed the river to resettle. He built a log cabin for them at the bottom of the bluff, and became the area's first white settler.

As steamboat traffic on the Mississippi increased, more European Americans began to settle here. Around 1827, John Jacob Astor established a post of his American Fur Company at the foot of the bluff. Five buildings were erected to house workers and the business. This area became known as the "Rat Row".

One of the earliest descriptions of Keokuk was by Caleb Atwater in 1829:

The village is a small one containing twenty families perhaps. The American Fur Company have a store here and there is a tavern. Many Indians were fishing and their lights on the rapids in a dark night were darting about appearing and disappearing like so many fire flies; the constant roaring of the waters, on the rapids the occasional Indian yell, the lights of their fires on the shore, and the boisterous mirth of the people at the doggery attracted my attention occasionally while we were lying here. Fish were caught here in abundance.

The settlement was part of the land designated in 1824 as a Half-Breed Tract by the United States Government for allotting land to mixed-race descendants of the Sauk and Meskwaki tribes. Typically children of European or British men (fur traders and trappers) and Native women, they were often excluded from tribal communal lands because their fathers were not tribal members. Native Americans considered the settlement a neutral ground. Rules for the tract prohibited individual sale of the land, but the US Congress ended this provision in 1837, creating a land rush and instability.

Centering on the riverboat trade, the settlement continued to grow. The village became known as Keokuk shortly after the Blackhawk War in 1832. Why residents named it after the Sauk chief is unknown. Keokuk was incorporated on December 13, 1847. Soon after, Captain W. Clark would be elected as the first mayor. On December 14, 1848, Keokuk was incorporated as a city by the 2nd General Assembly of the State of Iowa.

Barnard States Merriam was elected mayor in 1852 and reelected in 1854.

In 1853, Keokuk was one of the centers for outfitting additional immigrant Latter-Day Saints pioneers for their handcart journey west; 2,000 Christian Latter-Day Saints passed through the city.

Keokuk was the longtime home of Orion Clemens, brother of Samuel Clemens, better known as Mark Twain. Samuel's visits to his brother's home led him to write of the beauty of Keokuk and southeastern Iowa in Life on the Mississippi.

At one time, because of its position at the foot of the lower rapids of the Mississippi, Keokuk was known as the Gate City. During the American Civil War, Keokuk became an embarking point for Union troops heading to fight in southern battles. Injured soldiers were returned to Keokuk for treatment, so several hospitals were established. A national cemetery was designated for those who did not survive. After the war was over, Keokuk continued its expansion. A medical college was founded, along with a major-league baseball team, the Keokuk Westerns, in 1875.

In 1913, Lock and Dam No. 19 was completed nearby on the Mississippi River. The population of Keokuk reached 15,106 by 1930. During the last half of the 20th century, Keokuk became less engaged in Mississippi River trade and more dependent on jobs in local factories.

== Geography ==
Keokuk is in Iowa's southeast corner along the Mississippi River and just northeast of the Des Moines River. Hamilton, Illinois, lies to the east across the Mississippi on U.S. Route 136.

According to the United States Census Bureau, the city has a total area of 10.58 square miles (27.40 km^{2}), of which 9.13 square miles (23.65 km^{2}) is land and 1.45 square miles (3.76 km^{2}) is water. The lowest point in the state of Iowa is 480 feet (150 m), located to the immediate south-west of Keokuk where the confluence of the Des Moines and Mississippi Rivers creates a tripoint between Iowa, Illinois and Missouri.

=== Climate ===
Keokuk has a humid continental climate. It is known for having recorded the highest temperature ever in Iowa, 118 °F (48 °C), on July 20, 1934.

Climate data for Keokuk, Iowa (1991–2020 normals, extremes 1896–present)
Month	Jan	Feb	Mar	Apr	May	Jun	Jul	Aug	Sep	Oct	Nov	Dec	Year
Record high °F (°C)	72 (22)	78 (26)	88 (31)	92 (33)	102 (39)	104 (40)	118 (48)	110 (43)	102 (39)	94 (34)	82 (28)	73 (23)	118 (48)
Mean maximum °F (°C)	57.4 (14.1)	62.1 (16.7)	73.8 (23.2)	82.7 (28.2)	88.5 (31.4)	93.7 (34.3)	96.5 (35.8)	96.4 (35.8)	91.9 (33.3)	84.9 (29.4)	71.0 (21.7)	60.1 (15.6)	98.5 (36.9)
Mean daily maximum °F (°C)	33.0 (0.6)	38.0 (3.3)	49.7 (9.8)	62.4 (16.9)	72.8 (22.7)	82.0 (27.8)	85.6 (29.8)	84.0 (28.9)	77.4 (25.2)	65.0 (18.3)	50.5 (10.3)	38.2 (3.4)	61.6 (16.4)
Daily mean °F (°C)	24.9 (−3.9)	29.1 (−1.6)	40.1 (4.5)	51.9 (11.1)	62.7 (17.1)	72.3 (22.4)	76.1 (24.5)	74.4 (23.6)	66.8 (19.3)	54.7 (12.6)	41.6 (5.3)	30.3 (−0.9)	52.1 (11.2)
Mean daily minimum °F (°C)	16.7 (−8.5)	20.3 (−6.5)	30.6 (−0.8)	41.4 (5.2)	52.6 (11.4)	62.5 (16.9)	66.6 (19.2)	64.8 (18.2)	56.3 (13.5)	44.4 (6.9)	32.6 (0.3)	22.5 (−5.3)	42.6 (5.9)
Mean minimum °F (°C)	−3.2 (−19.6)	1.6 (−16.9)	12.7 (−10.7)	28.6 (−1.9)	40.2 (4.6)	52.4 (11.3)	58.9 (14.9)	56.5 (13.6)	43.2 (6.2)	30.7 (−0.7)	17.5 (−8.1)	4.4 (−15.3)	−7.0 (−21.7)
Record low °F (°C)	−22 (−30)	−27 (−33)	−11 (−24)	11 (−12)	28 (−2)	40 (4)	50 (10)	43 (6)	30 (−1)	13 (−11)	−3 (−19)	−20 (−29)	−27 (−33)
Average precipitation inches (mm)	1.61 (41)	1.82 (46)	2.54 (65)	4.21 (107)	5.26 (134)	5.21 (132)	4.08 (104)	3.77 (96)	3.42 (87)	3.32 (84)	2.56 (65)	1.95 (50)	39.75 (1,010)
Average precipitation days (≥ 0.01 in)	8.0	7.9	9.1	11.0	12.6	10.4	9.4	7.6	7.1	8.6	7.9	7.7	107.3
Source: NOAA

== Demographics ==
Historical population
Census	Pop.	Note	%±
1850	2,478		—
1860	8,136		228.3%
1870	12,766		56.9%
1880	12,117		−5.1%
1890	14,101		16.4%
1900	14,641		3.8%
1910	14,008		−4.3%
1920	14,423		3.0%
1930	15,106		4.7%
1940	15,076		−0.2%
1950	16,144		7.1%
1960	16,316		1.1%
1970	14,631		−10.3%
1980	13,536		−7.5%
1990	12,451		−8.0%
2000	11,427		−8.2%
2010	10,780		−5.7%
2020	9,900		−8.2%
U.S. Decennial Census

=== 2020 census ===
As of the 2020 census, Keokuk had a population of 9,900, with 4,138 households and 2,495 families residing in the city. The population density was 1,088.0 inhabitants per square mile (420.1/km^{2}), and there were 4,756 housing units at an average density of 522.7 per square mile (201.8/km^{2}).

The median age was 41.4 years. 23.3% of residents were under the age of 18, 5.3% were between the ages of 20 and 24, 23.0% were from 25 to 44, 24.3% were from 45 to 64, and 21.7% were 65 years of age or older. The gender makeup of the city was 48.5% male and 51.5% female. For every 100 females, there were 94.0 males, and for every 100 females age 18 and over there were 90.2 males age 18 and over.

97.2% of residents lived in urban areas, while 2.8% lived in rural areas.

Of the 4,138 households, 28.2% had children under the age of 18 living with them, 39.5% were married-couple households, 8.8% were cohabitating couples, 20.9% were households with a male householder and no spouse or partner present, and 30.9% were households with a female householder and no spouse or partner present. 39.7% of all households were non-families, 34.3% of all households were made up of individuals, and 16.4% had someone living alone who was 65 years of age or older.

There were 4,756 housing units, of which 13.0% were vacant. The homeowner vacancy rate was 3.4% and the rental vacancy rate was 11.4%.

Racial composition as of the 2020 census
Race	Number	Percent
White	8,735	88.2%
Black or African American	368	3.7%
American Indian and Alaska Native	16	0.2%
Asian	61	0.6%
Native Hawaiian and Other Pacific Islander	3	0.0%
Some other race	56	0.6%
Two or more races	661	6.7%
Hispanic or Latino (of any race)	217	2.2%

=== 2010 census ===
As of the census of 2010, there were 10,780 people, 4,482 households, and 2,818 families residing in the city. The population density was 1,170 inhabitants per square mile (450/km^{2}). There were 5,199 housing units at an average density of 565 per square mile (218/km^{2}). The racial makeup of the city was 91.9% White, 4.0% African American, 0.2% Native American, 0.8% Asian, < 0.1% Pacific Islander, 0.3% from other races, and 2.8% from two or more races. 1.8% of the population were Hispanic or Latino of any race.

There were 4,482 households, out of which 31.1% had children under the age of 18 living with them, 43.3% were married couples living together, 14.4% had a female householder with no husband present, and 37.1% were non-families. 32.1% of all households were made up of individuals, and 15.9% had someone living alone who was 65 years of age or older. The average household size was 2.36 and the average family size was 2.94.

Population spread: 24.4% under the age of 18, 8.3% from 18 to 24, 23.1% from 25 to 44, 26.7% from 45 to 64, and 17.4% who were 65 years of age or older. The median age was 40 years. For every 100 females, there were 88.4 males. For every 100 females age 18 and over, there were 86.6 males.

=== 2000 census ===
As of the census of 2000, there were 11,427 people, 4,773 households, and 3,021 families residing in the city. The population density was 1,247.5 inhabitants per square mile (481.7/km^{2}). There were 5,327 housing units at an average density of 581.6 per square mile (224.6/km^{2}). The racial makeup of the city was 92.87% White, 3.90% African American, 0.27% Native American, 0.52% Asian, 0.01% Pacific Islander, 0.45% from other races, and 1.99% from two or more races. 1.09% of the population were Hispanic or Latino of any race.

There were 4,773 households, out of which 29.9% had children under the age of 18 living with them, 46.8% were married couples living together, 13.2% had a female householder with no husband present, and 36.7% were non-families. 32.4% of all households were made up of individuals, and 16.2% had someone living alone who was 65 years of age or older. The average household size was 2.35 and the average family size was 2.97.

Population spread: 25.4% under the age of 18, 8.6% from 18 to 24, 25.5% from 25 to 44, 22.9% from 45 to 64, and 17.7% who were 65 years of age or older. The median age was 38 years. For every 100 females, there were 88.4 males. For every 100 females age 18 and over, there were 83.9 males.

The median income for a household in the city was $31,586, and the median income for a family was $39,574. Males had a median income of $31,213 versus $21,420 for females. The per capita income for the city was $17,144. 11.9% of the population and 8.1% of families were below the poverty line. Out of the total population, 15.7% of those under the age of 18 and 13.4% of those 65 and older were living below the poverty line.

== Arts and culture ==
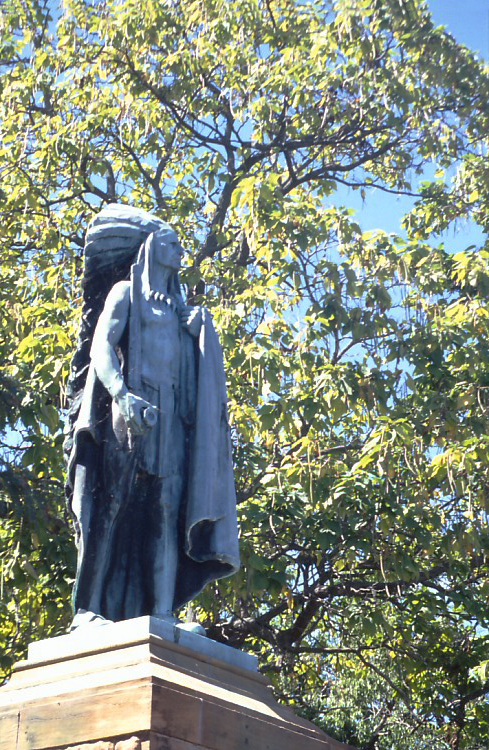
Keokuk Monument, by Nellie Walker

Attractions in Keokuk include:

- Lock and Dam No. 19, a hydroelectric power plant located on the Mississippi River. Built in 1913, it was the largest single powerhouse electric generating plant and longest dam in the world, with the longest and highest voltage transmission line in the world.
- The Grand Theatre, a performing arts center.
- Chief Keokuk Monument, a marble slab and bronze statue marking the grave of Sauk leader Keokuk, erected in 1913 by Nellie Walker.
- Keokuk National Cemetery
- Keokuk Veteran's Memorial
- Miller House Museum
- George M. Verity River Museum.

== Sports ==
Keokuk has deep baseball history that started in 1875 when the Keokuk Westerns played in the National Association. On May 4, 1875, the Westerns and the Chicago White Stockings (today's Chicago Cubs) played the first professional baseball game in Iowa. The Keokuk Indians minor league team played in the Iowa State League (1904–1907), Central Association (1908–1915), Mississippi Valley League (1929–1933) and Western League (1935). After the Indians (1904–1915, 1929–1933, 1935), Keokuk was home to the Keokuk Pirates (1947–1949), Keokuk Kernels (1952-1957), Keokuk Cardinals (1958–1961) and the Keokuk Dodgers (1962). The team was an affiliate of the St. Louis Cardinals, Pittsburgh Pirates, Cleveland Indians and the Los Angeles Dodgers. Notable players included baseball pioneer Bud Fowler, 1961 Home Run Record Holder Roger Maris, Player/Announcer Tim McCarver and three time World Series Champion with the New York Yankees Jack Saltzgaver.

Keokuk is nicknamed "The Racing Capital of the World" and "Home of Champions" for having many racing drivers win races and championships. Don White was the first driver to impact nationally; he won the 1954, 1955 and 1958 IMCA national championships. White's brother-in-law Ernie Derr won the 12 IMCA national championships between 1953 and 1971. White helped Dick Hutcherson get started; Hutcherson won the 1963 and 1964 IMCA championship before moving to NASCAR and finishing second in points. Ramo Stott won the 1970 and 1971 ARCA and 1976 USAC Stock Car championships. White, Derr, Hutcherson, and Stott were nicknamed "The Keokuk Gang". Ron Hutcherson, Dick's brother, also competed nationally.

People living in the area support athletic teams in Saint Louis, Missouri, differing from other parts of Iowa, which support other sports teams.

== Education ==
The Keokuk Community School District has two elementary schools (George Washington, and Hawthorne), Keokuk Middle School, and Keokuk High School. Several additional elementary schools have been closed over the years (Torrence, Lincoln, Garfield, Wells Carey, and Jefferson). The middle school was damaged by a fire in 2001 and replaced by a new school on a lot next to the high school.

Private education is provided by Keokuk Catholic Schools (St. Vincent's School) and Keokuk Christian Academy. Keokuk Catholic previously had a senior high school division, Cardinal Stritch High School; in 2006 it merged into Holy Trinity High School in Fort Madison.

A campus of Southeastern Community College is located in Keokuk.

== Sister city ==
- Kai, Japan

== Notable people ==
- Teresa Adams (1869 –1947), American civil rights activist and suffragist
- Edward P. Alexander, author, historian, and educator
- Herman C. Baehr, 36th Mayor of Cleveland, Ohio
- Mary Calhoun, children's book author
- William H. Clagett, politician
- Orion Clemens, first and only secretary of Nevada Territory and brother of Mark Twain
- William Lane Craig, analytic philosopher and Christian apologist
- Samuel Curtis, military officer
- Ernie Derr, stock car driver
- Mary Fels, philanthropist, suffragist, Georgist
- Bud Fowler, first professional African American baseball player
- Nathaniel Lyon Gardner, botanist, born in Keokuk
- Jerry Harrington, baseball player
- James B. Howell, newspaper editor and U.S. senator, resided in Keokuk
- Howard Hughes, aviator, engineer, industrialist, film producer and director, and philanthropist
- Howard R. Hughes, Sr., businessman and inventor; father of Howard Hughes
- Rupert Hughes, novelist, screenwriter, film director, historian; uncle of Howard Hughes
- Dick Hutcherson, stock car driver
- Ron Hutcherson, stock car driver
- John N. Irwin, Governor of Idaho Territory (1883) and of Arizona Territory (1890–1892)
- Edward Kimball, actor
- Lloyd Steel Lourie, orthodontist
- Samuel Taylor Marshall, lawyer and founder of Beta Theta Pi fraternity
- Elsa Maxwell, gossip columnist, socialite
- Edward Joseph McManus, U.S. federal judge and Lieutenant Governor of Iowa (1959 – 1961)
- Grace Medes, biochemist
- Samuel Freeman Miller, Supreme Court justice
- Conrad Nagel, actor and a founder of the Academy Awards
- Richard Page, lead vocalist and bass player for the band Mr. Mister
- George Pomutz, Union Army officer and diplomat
- Mike Pyle, NFL player
- Palmer Pyle, NFL player
- John M. Rankin, Iowa state legislator and judge
- Hugh T. Reid, Union Army general
- Jack Saltzgaver, Major League Baseball player
- Jeremy Soule composer of video game soundtracks
- Frank Steunenberg, Governor of Idaho (1897–1901)
- Ramo Stott, stock car driver
- James Vandenberg, football quarterback
- Don White, stock car driver
- Verner Moore White, artist, painted oil of Keokuk presented to President Theodore Roosevelt
- Annie Turner Wittenmyer, social reformer and relief worker

== In popular culture ==
Keokuk is mentioned among funny place names by Krusty the Clown in The Simpsons sixth-season episode "Homie the Clown".

== See also ==
- National Register of Historic Places listings in Lee County, Iowa
