= Ernie Derr =

American racing driver (1921–2014)

- Born: October 29, 1921; Donnellson, Iowa, U.S.
- Died: January 8, 2014 (aged 92); Keokuk, Iowa, U.S.
- Height: 5 ft 8 in (173 cm)
- Weight: 165 lb (75 kg)
- Achievements: 12x IMCA Stock Car champion (1953, 1959-1962, 1965-1971); 328x IMCA race winner
- Awards: Des Moines Register Sports Hall of Fame inductee; Mopar Hall of Fame inductee (2018); Iowa Racing Hall of Fame inductee (2018)

NASCAR Cup Series career
- 1 race run over 1 year
- First race: 1953 Race No. 25 (Davenport)
Wins	Top tens	Poles
0	0	0

Ernest Virgil Derr (October 29, 1921 – January 8, 2014) was an American stock car racing driver. He won 12 IMCA Stock Car championships, made one start in the NASCAR Grand National Series, and won eleven ARCA Racing Series races. Along with Dick Hutcherson, Ramo Stott and Don White, Derr was a member of the "Keokuk Komets", a collection of racing drivers from Keokuk, Iowa.

== Racing career ==
After watching brother-in-law Don White race in the late 1940s, Derr began his racing career in 1950. Earning his reputation mainly on half-mile dirt tracks, Derr won his first International Motor Contest Association championship in 1953, and won four consecutive IMCA championships between 1959 and 1962. He also ran one NASCAR Grand National Series race in 1953, at Davenport, and dabbled in the ARCA Racing Series (then the Midwest Association for Race Cars), notching six wins in 1955 and eleven career wins. He picked up factory backing from General Motors in 1963, but switched to Chrysler support the following year and stuck with them through 1970. Derr also claimed seven consecutive IMCA championships from 1965 to 1971. During his later years, Derr transitioned more to USAC Stock Car racing.

Derr retired from racing after the 1977 season, running his last race at Knoxville Raceway. He said that his only regret in racing was not running more NASCAR races during the sport's formative years. At the end of his career, Derr had 328 IMCA wins, a record that stood until 2005.

== Personal life ==
Derr served in the 6th Armored Division during World War II. Before racing full-time, Derr was an automotive parts worker. After retiring from racing, Derr became a property manager in Keokuk, Iowa. His son Mike was also an IMCA racer, and at the time of his death, Ernie had been married to his wife Marianna for 67 years. He died at his home on January 8, 2014.

== Motorsports career results ==
=== NASCAR ===
==== Grand National Series ====
NASCAR Grand National Series results
Year	Owner	No.	Make	1	2	3	4	5	6	7	8	9	10	11	12	13	14	15	16	17	18	19	20	21	22	23	24	25	26	27	28	29	30	31	32	33	34	35	36	37	NGNC	Pts	Ref
1953	Ernie Derr		Olds	PBS	DAB	HAR	NWS	CLT	RCH	CCS	LAN	CLB	HCY	MAR	PMS	RSP	LOU	FFS	LAN	TCS	WIL	MCF	PIF	MOR	ATL	RVS	LCF	DAV; 11	HBO	AWS	PAS	HCY	DAR	CCS	LAN	BLF	WIL	NWS	MAR	ATL	N/A	N/A	
