= IMCA Stock Car =

IMCA Stock Car is a division of International Motor Contest Association (IMCA)-sanctioned racing featuring stock cars. It currently sponsors various races in the Midwestern United States.

== First era (1940s–70s) ==
The division's roots began in the late 1940s. The first documented IMCA-sanctioned stock car race took place on May 30, 1949 at the Mid-America Fairgrounds in Topeka, Kansas. In its first season, 1949, the division ran approximately between twelve and fifteen races. Its unofficial season champion was Eddie Anderson. The first era of competition ran from 1949 until 1977, with a season champion being determined at the end of each season.

At its peak, IMCA stock car races attracted crowds of more than 20,000. Many of its races were held at state fairs in Iowa, Minnesota, and Nebraska.

By the late-1970s, the division had been branded "Late Models". The last race of its 1977 season (the last race of the first chapter of IMCA Stock Car racing) took place on September 10, 1977 at the Clay County Fair in Spencer, Iowa. More than 600 events were held in the division's first era, between the 1940s and 1977. The era ended after the 1977 season, after experience declining attendance.

Ernie Derr was often dubbed "Mr. IMCA Stock Car" for his record of 328 wins and twelve season titles.

Drivers who spent their early careers in IMCA Stock Car included Dick Hutcherson (a two-time season champion who later became a star in NASCAR), Don White (a three-time season champion who later achieved top success in USAC Stock Car), Johnny Beauchamp (a later NASCAR driver, who had great success in the 1956 and 1957 IMCA seasons).

== Current era (1984–present) ==
IMCA began sanctioning stock car racing again in 1984.

=== National champions since 1988 ===
National champions since 1988 have been:

- 2024 – Mike Nichols of Harlan, IA
- 2023 – Mike Nichols of Harlan, IA
- 2022 – Mike Nichols of Harlan, IA
- 2021 – Mike Nichols of Harlan, IA
- 2020 – Mike Nichols of Harlan, IA
- 2019 – Jordan Grabouski of Beatrice, NE
- 2018 – Mike Nichols of Harlan, IA
- 2017 – Mike Nichols of Harlan, IA
- 2016 – Mike Nichols of Harlan, IA
- 2015 – Travis Van Straten of Hortonville, WI
- 2014 – Mike Nichols of Harlan, IA
- 2013 – Brandon Czarapata of Appleton, WI
- 2012 – Brandon Czarapata of Appleton, WI
- 2011 – Keith White of Little River Academy, TX
- 2010 – Mike Nichols of Harlan, IA
- 2009 – Dustin Smith of Lake City, IA
- 2008 – Rod Snellenberger of Pulaski, WI
- 2007 – Mike Nichols of Harlan, IA
- 2006 – David Smith of Lake City, IA
- 2005 – Damon Murty of Chelsea, IA
- 2004 – Mike Nichols of Harlan, IA
- 2003 – Duain Pritchett of Combine, TX
- 2002 – Mike Nichols of Harlan, IA
- 2001 – Jeff Anderson of Atlantic, IA
- 2000 – Jeff Anderson of Atlantic, IA
- 1999 – Jeff Anderson of Atlantic, IA
- 1998 – Jeff Anderson of Atlantic, IA
- 1997 – Jeff Anderson of Atlantic, IA
- 1996 – Larry Portis of Nora Springs, IA
- 1995 – Larry Portis of Nora Springs, IA
- 1994 – Bobby Greiner Jr. of Ottumwa, IA
- 1993 – John Gregorich of Kewaunee, WI
- 1992 – Dennis Terning of Cokato, MN
- 1991 – Steve Jackson of Des Moines, IA
- 1990 – John Fose of Wakeeney, KS
- 1989 – Brian Efkamp of Boone, IA
- 1988 – Steve Jackson of Des Moines, IA
