= Edward P. Alexander =

American historian (1907–2003)

- Born: Edward Porter Alexander; January 11, 1907; Keokuk, Iowa, U.S.
- Died: July 31, 2003 (aged 96)
- Education: Drake University; University of Iowa; Columbia Graduate School of Arts and Sciences
- Occupations: Historian; museum administrator; educator; writer

Edward Porter Alexander (January 11, 1907 – July 31, 2003) was an American historian, museum administrator, educator and writer. He served for nearly 30 years as vice-president for interpretation at Colonial Williamsburg (1946–1972) and founded the Museum Studies program at the University of Delaware, which he directed for its first six years.

== Early life and education ==
Alexander was born in Keokuk, Iowa, where he went to public schools. He graduated from Drake University in Des Moines, and earned a master's degree in history at the University of Iowa. He earned a doctorate in history at Columbia University.

== Career ==
Alexander worked mostly in museums and historical centers. He served as director of the New York State Historical Association at Ticonderoga and Cooperstown from 1934 to 1941.

He went to Wisconsin, where he served as the director of the Historical Society of Wisconsin from 1941 to 1946.

For nearly 30 years, he directed activities as the vice president for interpretation at Colonial Williamsburg from 1946 to 1972. These were decades of major expansion and change, including the beginning of incorporation of more historical material about the common people, enslaved people and women.

Following this, he founded the Museum Studies Program at the University of Delaware, which he directed from 1972 until his retirement in 1978.

Deeply engaged in museum operations, he was elected president of the American Association of Museums and the American Association for State and Local History.

== Legacy and honors ==
- Alexander was awarded an honorary degree from Drake University.
- He was elected as a fellow of the Rochester Museum of Arts and Sciences (now known as the Rochester Museum & Science Center).

== Death ==
He died of a heart ailment at the age of 96.

== Published books ==
- James Duane: Revolutionary Conservative (1978),
- Museums in Motion: An Introduction to the History and Functions of Museums (1979),
- Museum Masters: Their Museums and Their Influence (1983),
- The Museum in America: Innovators and Pioneers (1997).
