= Billy Hagan (racing driver) =

American racing driver (1932–2007)

- Born: March 22, 1932; Lillie, Louisiana, U.S.
- Died: November 16, 2007 (aged 75); Concord, North Carolina, U.S.

NASCAR Cup Series career
- 3 races run over 3 years
- Best finish: 84th (1975)
- First race: 1969 Talladega 500 (Talladega)
- Last race: 1979 Texas 400 (Texas)
Wins	Top tens	Poles
0	1	0

24 Hours of Le Mans career
- Years: 1981–1982
- Teams: Stratagraph Inc.
- Best finish: 17th (1982)

Billy Joe Hagan (March 22, 1932 – November 16, 2007) was a NASCAR owner/driver. He owned Hagan Racing and was known for winning the 1984 NASCAR Winston Cup Series championship with Terry Labonte.

== Career ==
Hagan made three starts in NASCAR's Grand National/Winston Cup division, finishing eighth in his first start, the inaugural Talladega 500 in a self-owned 1968 Mercury Cyclone. He did not field another car until 1975, finishing 19th once again at Talladega. He also fielded a car for five races for Skip Manning.

In 1976, Hagan fielded the No. 92 Stratagraph Chevrolet Chevelle Laguna for Manning, and he won Rookie of the Year honors. Manning was released in 1978, and replaced by Terry Labonte. Hagan hired Petty Enterprises crew chief Dale Inman for the 1984 season. Labonte won the Southern 500, and won the 1984 championship. Labonte left the team in 1986, and was replaced by Sterling Marlin. Labonte returned to the team in 1991, but was unable to continue their success. 1994, marked Hagan's last season as a single car owner, fielding cars for John Andretti and Randy MacDonald. In 1996, his shop was purchased by Triad Motorsports. Hagan continued to serve as a co-owner of the operation until the team's demise in 1999.

In 1981, Hagan entered a Chevrolet Camaro stock car under the Stratagraph team name in the 24 Hours of Le Mans. Powered by a modified 350-cubic-inch Chevrolet small block, the car qualified well enough in the IMSA GT class, but was sidelined by a crash caused by brake failure. Drivers were Billy Hagan, Cale Yarborough, and Bill Cooper; also listed by some sources was Bobby Mitchell. The following year, he came 17th at 1982 24 Hours of Le Mans, always on Camaro V8 350 inch Chevrolet small block (No. 81 team Stratagraph inc.), paired with Gene Felton. The other team car (No. 80 Camaro V8, Stratagraph inc.) arrived in 19th.

== Death ==
Hagan died on November 16, 2007, at the age of 75.

== Motorsports career results ==
=== NASCAR ===
(key) (Bold – Pole position awarded by qualifying time. Italics – Pole position earned by points standings or practice time. * – Most laps led.)

==== Grand National Series ====
NASCAR Grand National Series results
Year	Team	No.	Make	1	2	3	4	5	6	7	8	9	10	11	12	13	14	15	16	17	18	19	20	21	22	23	24	25	26	27	28	29	30	31	32	33	34	35	36	37	38	39	40	41	42	43	44	45	46	47	48	49	50	51	52	53	54	NGNC	Pts
1969	Billy Hagan Racing	52	Mercury	MGR	MGY	RSD	DAY	DAY	DAY	CAR	AUG	BRI	ATL	CLB	HCY	GPS	RCH	NWS	MAR	AWS	DAR	BLV	LGY	CLT	MGR	SMR	MCH	KPT	GPS	NCF	DAY	DOV	TPN	TRN	BLV	BRI	NSV	SMR	ATL	MCH	SBO	BGS	AWS	DAR	HCY	RCH	TAL; 8	CLB	MAR	NWS	CLT	SVH	AUG	CAR	JFC	MGR	TWS	NA	-

==== Winston Cup Series ====
NASCAR Winston Cup Series results
Year	Team	No.	Make	1	2	3	4	5	6	7	8	9	10	11	12	13	14	15	16	17	18	19	20	21	22	23	24	25	26	27	28	29	30	31	NWCC	Pts
1975	Billy Hagan Racing	52	Chevy	RSD	DAY	RCH	CAR	BRI	ATL	NWS	DAR	MAR	TAL	NSV	DOV	CLT	RSD	MCH	DAY	NSV	POC	TAL; 19	MCH	DAR	DOV	NWS	MAR	CLT	RCH	CAR	BRI	ATL	ONT		84th	106
1978	Billy Hagan Racing	92	Chevy	RSD	DAY	RCH	CAR	ATL	BRI	DAR	NWS	MAR	TAL	DOV	CLT	NSV	RSD	MCH	DAY	NSV	POC	TAL	MCH	BRI	DAR	RCH	DOV	MAR	NWS	CLT	CAR	ATL	ONT; DNQ		NA	-
1979	Henley Gray	19	Chevy	RSD	DAY	CAR	RCH	ATL	NWS	BRI	DAR	MAR	TAL	NSV	DOV	CLT	TWS; 17	RSD	MCH	DAY	NSV	POC	TAL	MCH	BRI	DAR	RCH	DOV	MAR	CLT	NWS	CAR	ATL	ONT	95th	112

=== Complete 24 Hours of Le Mans results ===
(key)

Year	Team	Co-Drivers	Car	Class	Laps	Pos.	Class Pos.
1981	(United States) Stratagraph Inc.	(United States) Cale Yarborough (United States) Bill Cooper	Chevrolet Camaro	IMSA GTO	13	DNF	DNF
1982	(United States) Stratagraph Inc.	(United States) Gene Felton (United States) Tom Williams	Chevrolet Camaro	IMSA GTO	269	17th	**2nd**
