= Bobby Bottcher =

- Born: June 26, 1939 Manhattan, New York, U.S.
- Died: August 10, 2024 (aged 85) Palmerton, Pennsylvania, U.S.
- Retired: 1980
- Debut season: 1957

Modified racing career
- Car number: 666
- Championships: 1
- Wins: 72+

Robert Bottcher, Jr. (June 26, 1939 – August 10, 2024) was an American Dirt Modified racing driver. Bottcher had a 9-year winning streak at the Orange County Fair Speedway (New York, 1970–1979), capturing 26 modified features and the 1973 track championship at the venue during his career. Bottcher died at Palmerton, Pennsylvania on August 10, 2024, at the age of 85.

== Racing career ==
Bobby Bottcher started racing as a 16-year-old at Pennsylvania's Lehighton Fairgrounds and nearby Mahoning Valley Speedways in 1957. He went on to compete successfully at the Mid-Atlantic's toughest venues including Lebanon Valley Speedway in New York; Harmony Speedway in New Jersey; and Evergreen Raceway, Grandview Speedway, Nazareth Speedway, and the Reading Fairgrounds Speedway in Pennsylvania.

After he retired from driving, Bottcher turned to supporting his son Steve's racing career, which included a 1982 Sportsman division championship at Orange County. Bobby Bottcher was inducted into the Northeast Dirt Modified Hall of Fame in 2000.
