= 1981 24 Hours of Le Mans =

49th 24 Hours of Le Mans endurance race

Previous: 1980	Next: 1982
Index: Races | Winners

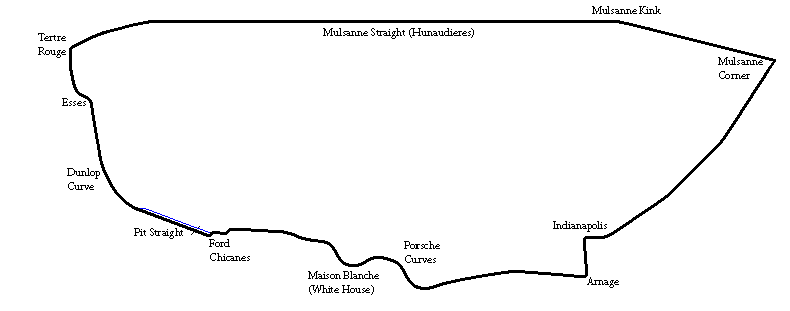
Le Mans in 1981

The 1981 24 Hours of Le Mans was the 49th Grand Prix of Endurance, and took place on 13 and 14 June 1981. It was also the eighth round of the World Endurance Championship of Drivers, and the fifth round of the World Championship for Makes.

Defending champions Rondeau entered a strong 5-car team. The Porsche works team challenged them with the final development of their 936, now fitted with the 2.65-litre turbo engine from the abandoned Indianapolis project. The prospect was sufficient to entice Jacky Ickx out of retirement again, teamed up with Derek Bell with whom he had already won the race in 1975. From the start, Ickx took the lead which he held until the first pit-stops. Soon after, the race was interrupted by two serious accidents on the Mulsanne Straight killing French driver Jean-Louis Lafosse and a track marshal. These events saw the first deployment at Le Mans of the pace-car system to slow the race, as repairs and medical attention were carried out.

When racing resumed Reinhold Joest's own 936 replica was now leading, but soon pitted with a cracked turbo-fan giving the lead to the 935 of the Kremer team. However, Bell soon overhauled it to re-take the lead that they would not relinquish for the rest of the race, as the car never missed a beat. The gap continued to grow through the night, eventually becoming 14 laps by the end – the largest winning margin in over a decade. The race had a surprising number of car problems in the first few hours for the leading teams, which strung out the field. The second Porsche had sparkplug issues as early as the first lap, but the pair ran 1-2 through the night, until its clutch failed at 7am. It fell to the two GTP-class Rondeau to mount the pursuit, finishing second and third. Fourth was the Charles Ivey team 935, winning the Group 5 class after the more fancied teams fell away, while the Charles Pozzi Ferrari 512 BB, finishing fifth, won the IMSA-GTX class and gave that marque its best result for eight years.

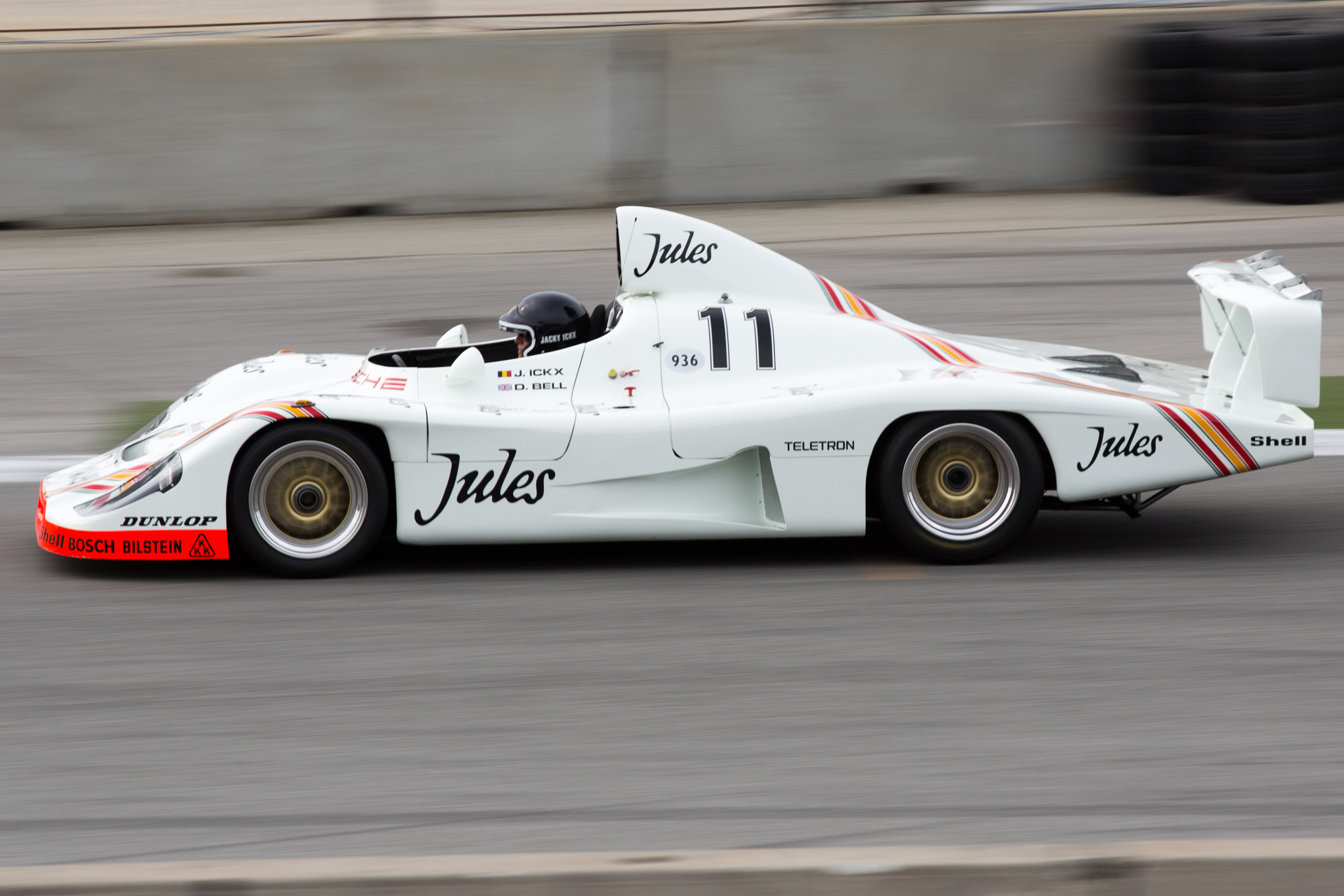
The race-winning Porsche 936 of Ickx/Bell

The win for Porsche made Ickx the first driver to achieve five outright victories and was a suitable finale to mark the last season of Group 6 racing.

== Regulations ==
The much-anticipated change of regulations to the new Group C was coming up in 1982 and meant there was little innovation. The significant change was in the qualifying system, which had proven so problematic for the previous year's race. The Automobile Club de l'Ouest (ACO) therefore reverted to its two days of qualifying, with four hours each on the Wednesday and Thursday. Engine changes were allowed again between qualifying and the race.

The class-by-class quota was also discarded so it would be the 55 fastest cars that would be on the grid and, finally, it would be each car's single fastest lap that would decide its grid position. Every car had to qualify within 110% of the average of the times of the three fastest cars in their class. Each car, and every driver, also had to qualify within 130% of the average of the three fastest cars overall.

The circuit had been widened at the approach to the Esses, adding a grass runoff after the Dunlop Curve. With an eye on improving safety measures further, this year saw the introduction of Mercedes "safety cars". Following the process used in American racing, they would be introduced to gather the field to slow it down in the event of a serious event on the circuit. Owing to the length of the circuit, three would be used to keep the field spread more evenly. The Le Mans Chamber of Commerce put up a fuel-efficiency award, co-sponsored by the Esso company.

With the retirement of Charles Deutsch as the Le Mans race director, the ACO appointed Marcel Martin to take his place. This year the race was rescheduled to 3pm, an hour earlier, to allow time on the Sunday afternoon for the French national elections.

== Entries ==
With declining fields, the FIA opened up the World Championship for Makes to allow Group 6 cars with engines greater than 3-litres, as well as Sports Prototypes of the pre-1976 Group 5 period. To get sufficient numbers for Le Mans, the ACO also broadened it criteria – accepting entries from 10 classes: Group 6 (and Gp 5/75) over and under 2-litre; Group 5 over and under 2-litre; Group 4; Le Mans GTP and from North America, the IMSA GTX (over/under 2-litre), GTO and GTU. They even accepted entries for the upcoming Group C.

Works entries came from Porsche, Lancia and Mazda (all competing in different classes), while specialist manufacturer Lola returned to the 2-litre class. The renewed interest with big-engine prototypes made the Group 6 class the best-supported with sixteen entries.

Class	Large-engines >2.0L classes	Medium-engines < 2.0L classes	Turbo engines
Group 6 S Sports	16 / 13	5 / 4	4 / 3
GTP GT Prototype	7 / 5	-	4 / 3
Group C	2 / 2	-	2 / 2
Group 5 SP Special Production	11 / 8	5 / 5	13 / 10
IMSA GTX	11 / 10	-	5 / 4
Group 4 GTS Special GT	6 / 4	-	4 / 2
IMSA GTO	4 / 4	-	1 / 1
IMSA GTU	1 / 0	-	0
Total Entries	61 / 46	10 / 9	33 / 25

- Note: The first number is the number of arrivals, the second the number who started.

=== Group 6, GTP and Group C ===
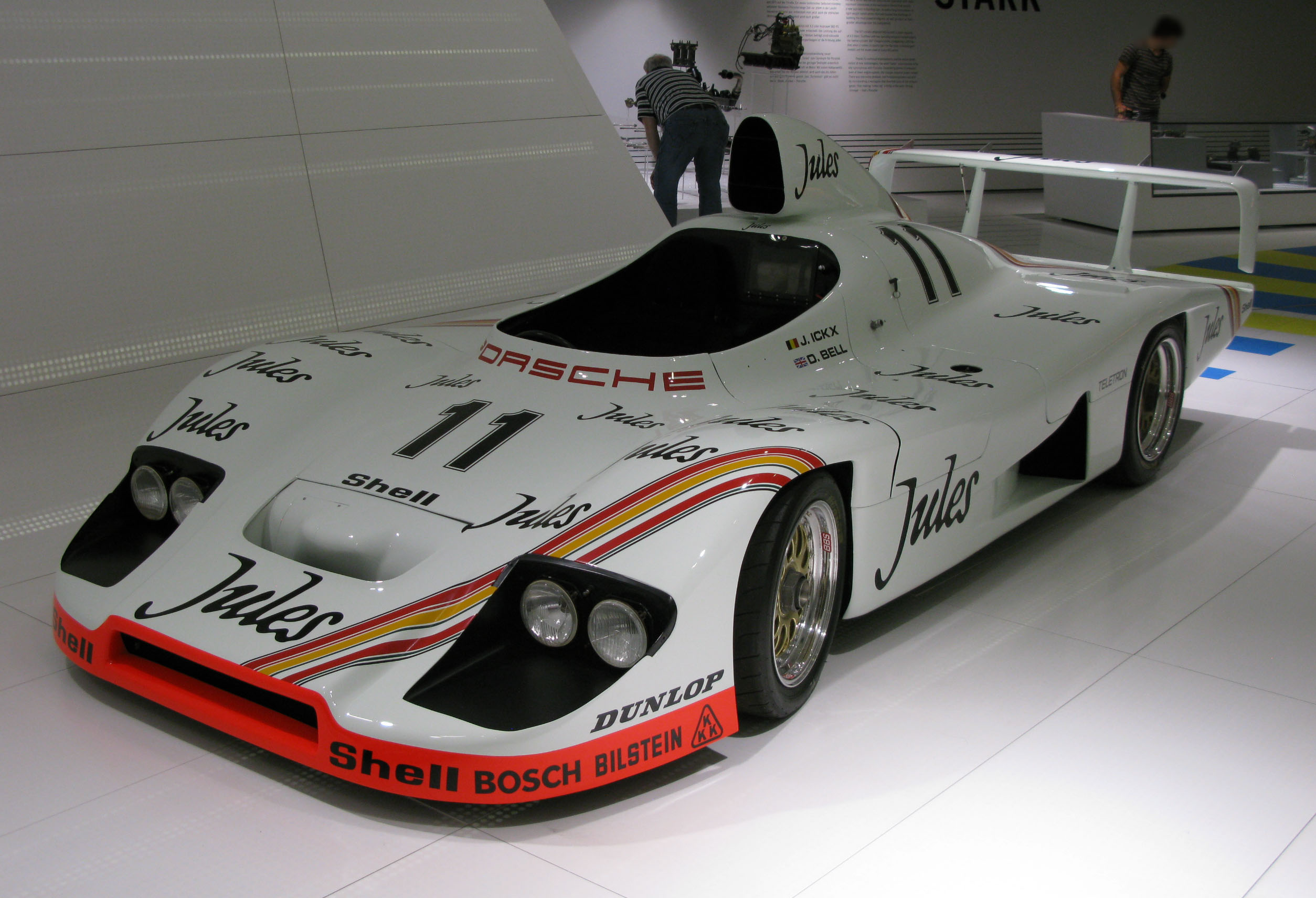
Porsche 936/81

This year the Porsche works team returned with its last development of the 936. It was fitted with the 2.65-litre turbo engine from the abandoned Indianapolis project. Built in conjunction with Ted Field's Interscope team, it had been banned in America, but the removal of the 3-litre upper-limit in the WCM made it eligible to be used at Le Mans. Converted to run on petrol instead of methanol and wound down in boost, it still generated 620 bhp at a canter and blasted the car down the Mulsanne straight at 355 kp/h (220 mph). The team also replaced the troublesome 5-speed gearbox with the old, race-proven 4-speed version from their 917/30 CanAm of the early '70s, that had been built to handle up to 1000 bhp. One chassis was pulled out of the Porsche museum and revamped. The preparation and prospects were sufficient to entice Jacky Ickx out of retirement once again, lured by the opportunity to become the first driver to achieve five Le Mans victories. He asked to have Derek Bell as his co-driver, with whom he had already shared one of his races win, in 1975 with Mirage. The second car would be driven by works driver Jochen Mass and Hurley Haywood. American Rick Mears was to have been the third driver, but the burns he received from the Indianapolis 500 had not healed sufficiently. His seat was taken by Australian Vern Schuppan who had finished third in the same race.

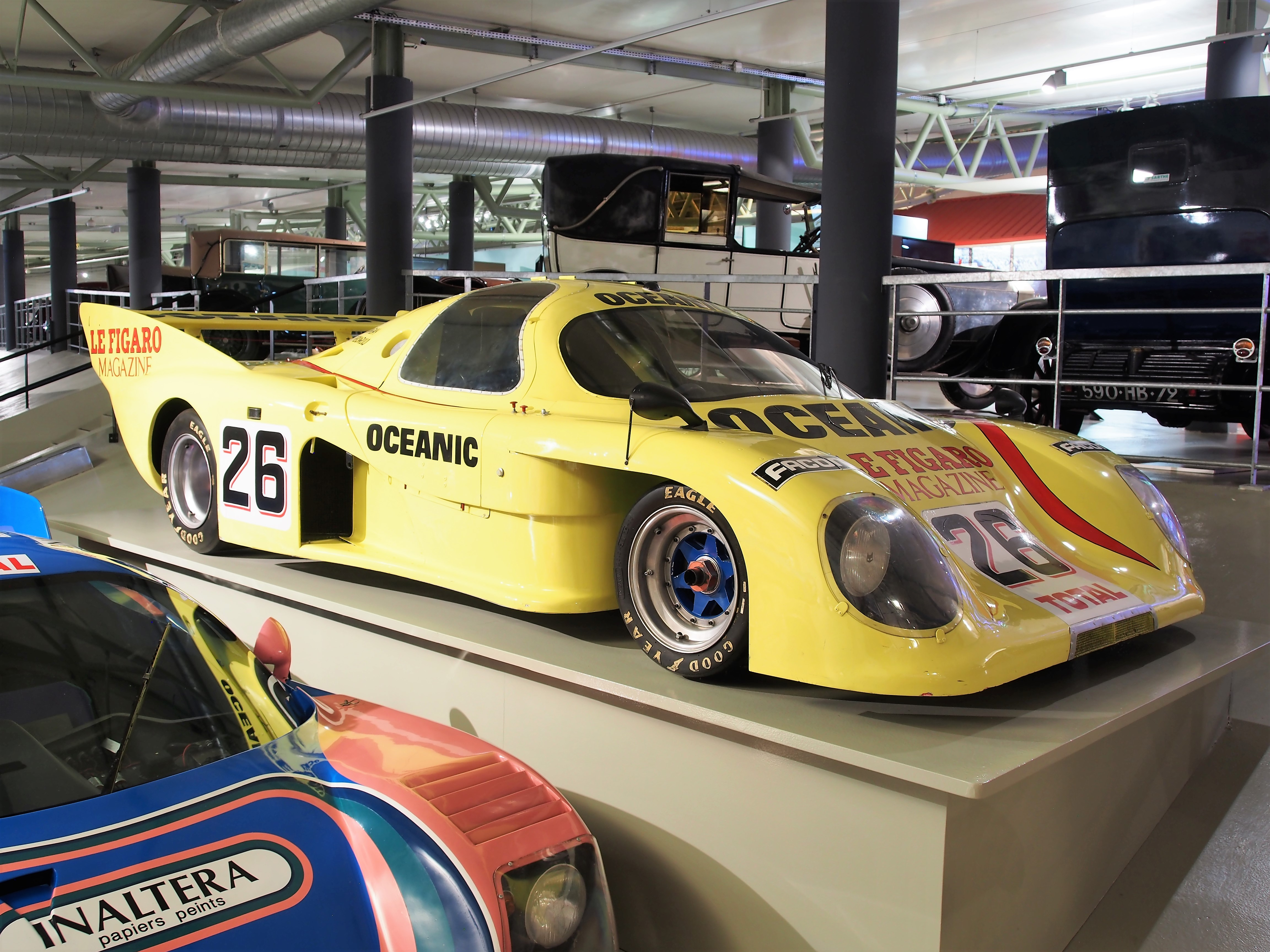
Rondeau M379C of Pescarolo/Tambay

In 1980, Le Mans local Jean Rondeau had become the first driver-constructor winner of the race. Sponsorship was not a problem this year and he was able to return in force with five cars (three in Group 6 and two in Le Mans GTP). All were the new M379C version, which had revised aerodynamics and an updated braking system. Two of the Group 6 cars were running the new 3.3-litre 530 bhp Cosworth DFL engine, a special endurance version of the Cosworth DFV. Those cars were run by Rondeau with Jean-Pierre Jaussaud (his winning co-driver) again, and Henri Pescarolo this time with French F1 driver Patrick Tambay. The third Group 6 car had Jean Ragnotti, who had won the year's Monte Carlo Rally, with Jean-Louis Lafosse. The two GTP entries were 60 kg heavier, with shorter windscreens and heavier wings. Their drivers were Le Mans local François Migault (in the race-winning chassis from the previous year), and Gordon Spice (despite him suffering a serious road-accident less than a month earlier) in one, and Jean-Louis Schlesser/Philippe Streiff/Jacky Haran in the other. Once again, Keith Greene (formerly of De Cadenet and Dome) was the team manager, while the engines were again tuned by Swiss engine-specialist Heini Mader.

Reinhold Joest entered his 540 bhp Porsche 936 replica again, that had finished second the year before. With his regular co-driver in the championship, Jochen Mass, driving for the Porsche works team, it was only in race-week itself that Joest announced his co-drivers: young German DRM driver Klaus Niedzwiedz and American Dale Whittington, youngest of the three brothers. One of the more unusual entries this year was from the Kremer brothers. With big engines again eligible in Group 6, they looked back to a decade earlier when the Porsche 917 was the fastest car on the track. They reasoned that with the current advances in engineering they could make it even better. They loaned an ex-Pedro Rodriguez model from the Midlands Motor Museum in England and fashioned a copy. Along with the 4.5-litre flat-12 engine, it was fitted with extra strengthening, revised suspension for modern tyres and adjusted aerodynamics. The team got a very experienced crew to drive it: Bob Wollek, Xavier Lapeyre and Guy Chasseuil.

In 1980, Porsche had entered three of its new 924 model, as true GT Prototypes. This year the company repeated the experiment with its next development of the model, the Porsche 944, potentially for the new Group B regulations coming in 1982. A new 2.5-litre, 16-valve twin-cam engine was fitted with a single turbo and could put out up to 410 bhp. But several engine failures during testing meant it was detuned down to 370 bhp for the race. Despite that, with the latest aerodynamic kit, the car could reach 305 kp/h (190 mph). Works driver Jürgen Barth was partnered with current World Rally Champion Walter Röhrl. Having achieved homologation, the works team also entered a 924 Carrera GTR in the IMSA GTO class, to be driven by Andy Rouse and Manfred Schurti.

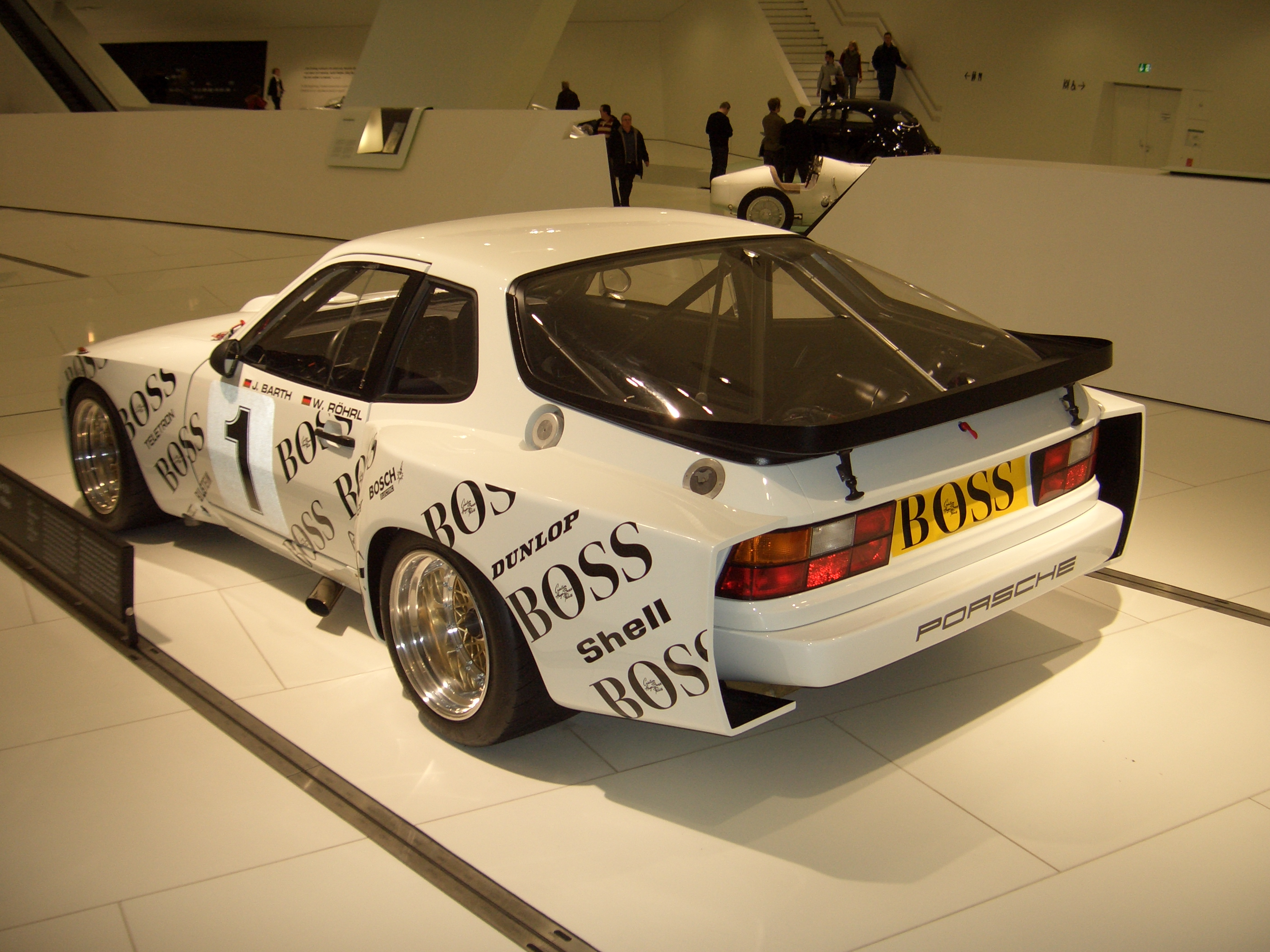
Porsche 944 of Barth/Röhrl in GTP class

Alain de Cadenet had plans this year to bring the new Ford C100 to Le Mans but it was still well short of being ready. So instead he entered his own Lola-derived model from the previous year, but fitted with the new 3.3-litre Cosworth DFL designed for the new Ford. This year his co-drivers were the Belgian Martin brothers, and De Cadenet gave up his usual British racing green for their red and white Belga tobacco sponsorship. After the debacle in qualifying, Nick Faure sold his De Cadenet LM76 to Tony Birchenough's Dorset Racing Associates. Nick was invited to join Irishmen Martin Birrane and Vivian Candy with the driving duties. Also disgruntled after the previous year's qualifying, Ian Bracey returned with his IBEC project. More refinement to the chassis and body had lightened it by 23 kg meaning it could reach 320 kp/h (200 mph). Once again, the drivers would be Tony Trimmer and Tiff Needell.

This year, the WM team got greater support from Peugeot. The three P79/80 cars were prepared for the GTP class while a new P81 was designed around the upcoming Group C regulations. A late decision by the team then converted one of the GTP cars to P81 specification. All were fitted with Peugeot's 2.7-litre V6 engine with the twin KKK (Kühnle, Kopp & Kausch) turbos. Peugeot had uprated them with four valves per cylinder and they now put out over 500 bhp to give excellent top-end speed, reaching almost 360 kp/h (225 mph) on the Mulsanne. After its success the previous year, a camera was once again mounted in the Dorchy/Fréquelin WM.

Eric Broadley's Lola Cars had been having recent success with their T600 model in the IMSA series and was making plans for Group C. A quasi-works team was managed by GRID racing, set up by Giuseppe Risi and Ian Dawson, racing in Europe by Guy Edwards and Emilio de Villota. In North America, Cooke-Woods Racing took their new car and fitted it with a 700 bhp, 3-litre turbo Porsche engine, assembled at Bob Garretson's facility in California. The engine's larger size meant the whole drivetrain and rear suspension had to be redesigned to accommodate it. Garretson's regular drivers, Brian Redman and Bobby Rahal were slated for the car. André Chevalley's small Swiss team had reworked their own adaptation of the Lola T286 with a major revision. More robust suspension and uprated aerodynamics added an extra 74 kg but made the car significantly faster. Chevalley raced with his regular co-driver Patrick Gaillard, and they were joined by Bruno Sotty

Dome brought the RL80 remodelled with composite bodywork. It was also now fitted with bigger front wheels and front brakes with extensive testing at the Fuji Speedway, with their regular team drivers Chris Craft and Bob Evans. Another radical wedge-shaped car appeared this year. The Ardex came from French aerodynamics specialist Max Sardou, who had previously worked with Matra and the March-BMW M1 project. The 470 bhp, 3.5-litre BMW engine, mounted in the front, was offset almost beside the driver. A very long, sloped windshield, large diffuser undertray and enclosed rear wheels were all designed to try and maximise downforce. A rogue entry came in from the American Z&W Enterprises team. Called a Mazda prototype for an IMSA GTP category spot, what turned up instead was, rather, a rough conversion of a 12-year old McLaren Can-Am fitted with a 5.7-litre Chevrolet V8 engine.

=== Group 6 (2-litre) ===
Through the late 1970s the 2-litre class had enjoyed strong support with a big entry-list of good variety, even though reliability was a perennial problem. This year however, there was only a desultory four entries, all based on the Lola chassis. Three French privateers ran the latest model, the T298, all with the BMW 2-litre engine, now developing 300 bhp. Jean-Philippe Grand returned with Le Mans local Yves Courage as co-driver, as did Pierre Yver, both with Primagaz sponsorship. Jean-Marie Lemerle had swapped out his ROC engine for the BMW after failing to quality last year.

A new entry using a Lola chassis was the French Renard-Delmas. Based on the T298 model, it was designed and built by Parisian engineering students and assisted by Citroën. It was fitted with one of the race-proven Simca-ROC engine. Louis Descartes and Hervé Bayard would be the drivers.

=== Group 5 (over 2-litre) ===
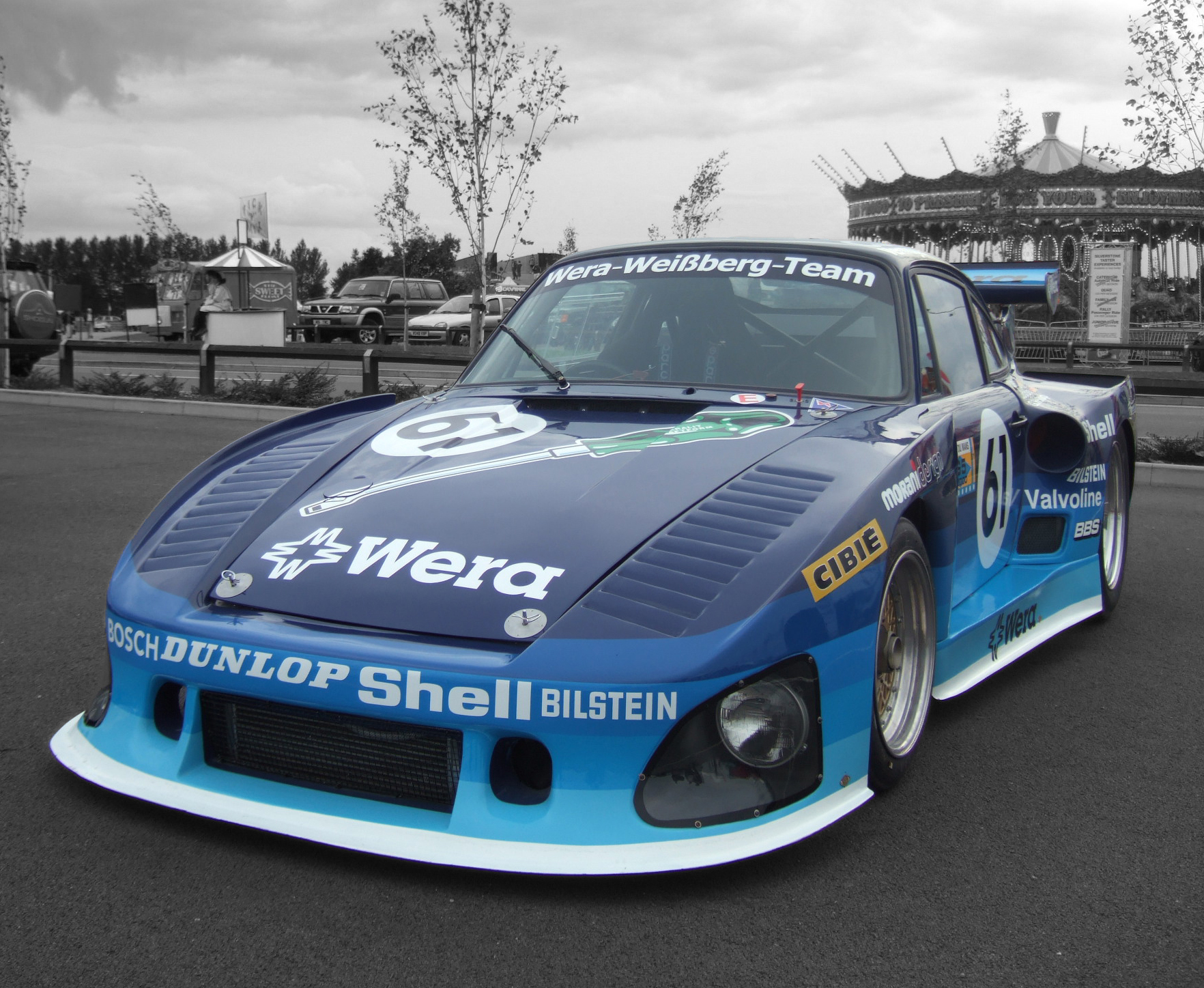
Weralit Porsche 935K3

The Porsche 935 remained the dominant model in Group 5, as it had been through this whole period. This dominance had been led by the two leading German teams of Georg Loos and the Kremer brothers, but this year the Gelo Racing team did not arrive. The Kremer-kit models were selling very well and four were entered in Group 5. Two of those were to be run by Kremer Racing, again in conjunction with American Ted Field's Interscope Racing. However the injury to Danny Ongais at the Indianapolis 500 forced one to be cancelled. Instead, Field signed up Don and Bill Whittington to race the other car with him. The brothers had given the Kremers their greatest triumph when they won the saturated 1979 race. The Weralit team had won an unexpected victory at the Monza round of the World Championship, and the drivers then (Jürgen Lässig, Edgar Dören and Gerhard Holup) were at Le Mans hoping to shake up the field again. Frenchman Claude Bourgoignie had an entry, but no sponsor, so he approached Brit Dudley Wood if he wanted to bring his older K3/79. Wood accepted and gave Bourgoignie a seat alongside his regular co-driver John Cooper. There were also two of the older 934-935 conversions from the Group 4 car, for Swiss Claude Haldi and Frenchman André Gahinet. Reinhold Joest had followed the Kremer example and was building kit-car adaptations of the 935 (called the "935J") for both the WCM and IMSA series, achieving reasonable success. They reprofiled the nose-section and extended the roof and rear with a larger wing. The Vegla team of Dieter Schornstein ran one in the WCM and won outright in the rain at the Silverstone round. Class-winners in 1980, the same drivers came again to Le Mans.

Their opponents would come from four BMW M1s, coming from four nationalities supported by the works team with strong driver line-ups. Both Hugues de Chaunac's local ORECA team (Philippe Alliot/Johnny Cecotto/Bernard Darniche) and Briton Steve O'Rourke's EMKA team were ex-Procars and had been doing well in the World Championship. O'Rourke was also manager of rock-band Pink Floyd and would have to fly to London each night (including during the race) as the band finished The Wall concert tour in London. Driving would rest with 13-race veteran David Hobbs and Eddie Jordan. The other two BMWs were assembled by Peter Sauber and prepared by his Swiss compatriot Heini Mader, and now tuned to put out 500 bhp. Fitted with space-frame chassis they were 90 bhp lighter than the Procars. Sauber ran one himself, led by drivers Dieter Quester and Marc Surer. He sold the other to German Gerhard Schneider, who won the foreshortened Nürburgring race outright with his drivers Hans-Joachim Stuck and Nelson Piquet, and entered this race in the IMSA-GTX class.

=== Group 5 (2-litre) ===
Lancia won the 1980 World Championship for Makes from Porsche on a countback, by dominating the 2-litre class. Continuing with a successful strategy with the Montecarlo, they did extensive work on the aerodynamics and tyre development with Pirelli. With a narrow championship lead this season, three works cars came to Le Mans with a talented line-up that included five F1 drivers. Class-winners for Lancia in 1980, Carlo Facetti and Martino Finotto, having crashed their very fast Ferrari 308 at Nürburgring, were brought in to bolster the young "hot-shots". With half an eye to getting a finish, and mindful of the poor performance the year before, the engines were detuned to 400 bhp. Once again, they were supported by a semi-works entry from the Italian Jolly Club customer team.

Surprise competition to Lancia came from Swede Jan Lundgardh with his special Porsche 935. It followed an idea from 1977 when the works team ran a small-engine Porsche in the DRM to take on the Escorts and BMWs. With support from the factory, Lundgardh's "baby-Porsche" (as it was coined) had a 1425cc turbocharged engine and was fitted with the streamlined, Kremer bodykit that made it 55 kg lighter than the Lancias. His co-drivers were Mike Wilds and Kremer team driver Axel Plankenhorn.

=== IMSA GTX ===
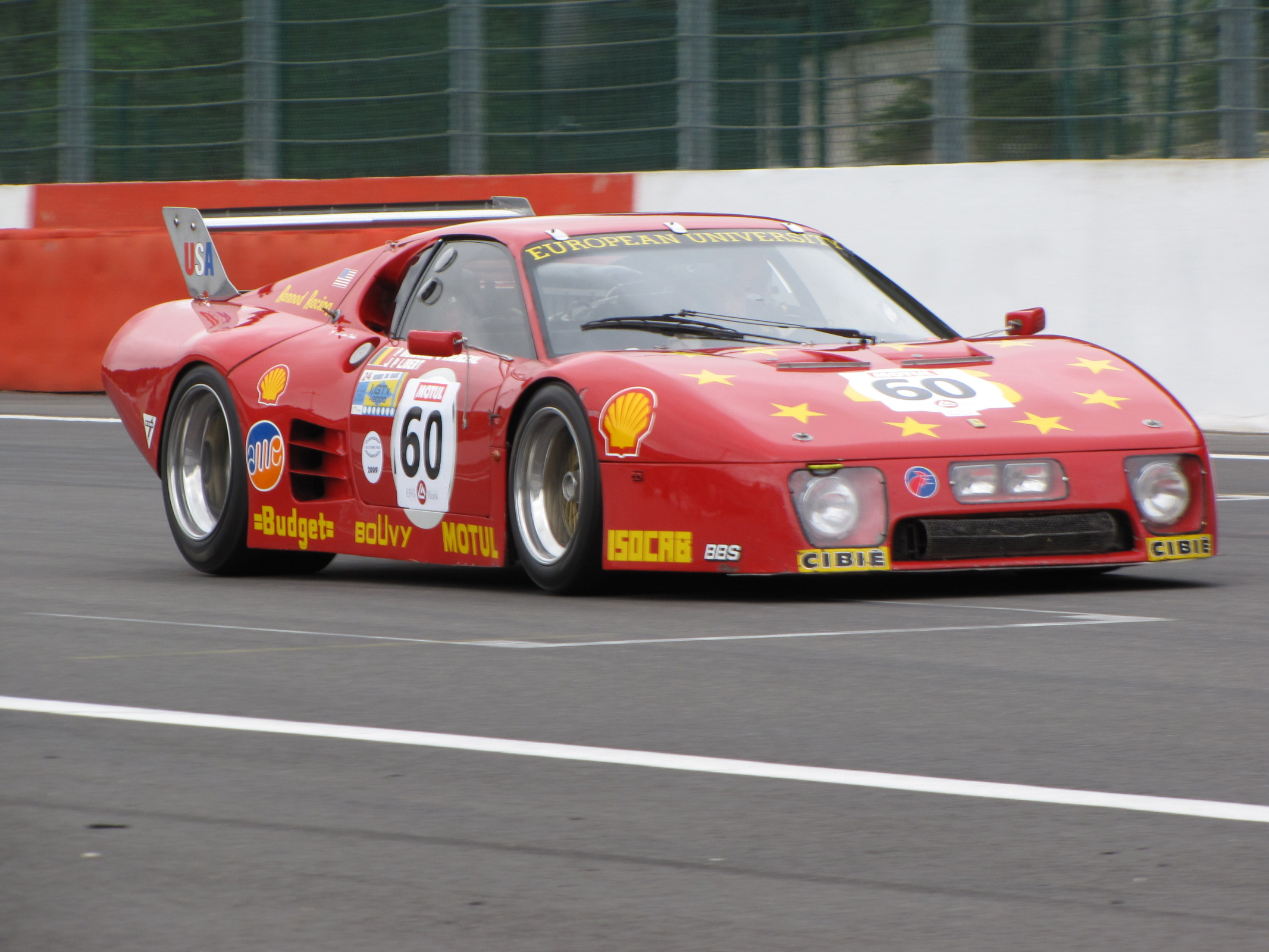
Ferrari 512 BB LM

As in Group 5, the Porsche 935 was ruling the IMSA series, but this year there would be five Ferraris to take on five Porsches. Curiously, Ferraris did not compete under the European Group 5 rules. There were three Kremer-modified Porsches from America, entered by Bob Akin, Preston Henn and Ralph Kent-Cooke. The latter sported the larger 3.2-litre twin-turbo engine and had won four IMSA races, including Daytona, for Bob Garretson. But with those winning drivers, Redman and Rahal, in Kent-Cooke's Group 6 car the owner took the wheel with Garretson and Anne-Charlotte Verney. Bob Akin's team had a brand new Kremer Porsche after their other car had been destroyed in the fatal accident at the Nürburgring that had killed Herbert Müller just a month earlier. Akin would have Paul Miller and Craig Siebert as co-drivers. Preston Henn had bought the IMSA-championship winning car from Dick Barbour but raced it without success this year in the US, until getting third at the Nürburgring. For this race he had Mike Chandler and Frenchman Marcel Mignot on his team. Joest entered a 935J with a 2.8-litre engine in the GTX class, for Porsche test driver Günther Steckkönig, with Kenper Miller and Mauricio de Narváez.

Up against the Porsches was an international squadron of Ferrari 512 BBs. Regular attendee, Charles Pozzi had sold two of his cars to American Tom Davis Jnr to run in IMSA, who in turn commissioned Pozzi to run the entry in this race with his regular team drivers, Claude Ballot-Léna/Jean-Claude Andruet in the seat. American Luigi Chinetti's North American Racing Team and the Belgian ETCC team-mates Pierre Dieudonné and Jean Xhenceval returned, and Brit Simon Phillips arrived with the last of the 25 LM BB models produced. That of the Roman Bellancauto team had a special streamlined bodyshell designed by Armando Palanca, and the engine tuned by Roberto Lippi.

=== Group 4 GT and IMSA GTO/GTU ===
The Group 4 GT class would be a battle between six Porsche and BMW privateers. After its success the previous year, there were three 924 Carrera 2-litre turbos from France, Great Britain and Australia. The three 924s were an international collection: Richard Lloyd's GTi Engineering had recently purchased their car. It was recalled to the Porsche factory, along with a brand new car for their Australian importer Alan Hamilton. With factory support, both were given a full engine rebuild to resolve the model's perennial fuel-feed issues. The Australian car had three of Australasia's top drivers: Peter Brock, Colin Bond and Jim Richards. The third car was entered by the French Eminence Racing Team of the Alméras brothers. Thierry Perrier returned, running a 3-litre turbo Porsche 934, with his ethanol-blend fuel. He and his two co-drivers were also part of a medical test from a team of young doctors. Fitted with heart monitors, each driver would have his blood pressure and other medical tests taken at each pit-stop. They would also only take their sustenance from calorie tablets.

However, this season it was the BMW M1 that had been the car to beat, with five class wins in the championship to date. Two such cars were entered, from François Sérvanin's Zol-Auto team and Dr Helmut Marko, the 1971 Le Mans winner. His car carried on the tradition of the BMW Art Car. German artist (and some-time racer) Walter Maurer hand-painted images of Munich on the car. It would be driven by Christian Danner, Peter Oberndorfer and Prince Leopold von Bayern.

Mazda was getting more interested in motor-racing and had recently formed a racing division, called Mazdaspeed to race the RX-7 model. A new 1308cc twin-rotary engine, producing 320 bhp, was put in the uprated RX-7 253i. In Europe they were raced by Tom Walkinshaw Racing With the FIA's 2:1 equivalence factor for rotaries, the car was rated as 2.6-litres which placed it in the GTO IMSA class. Two cars were entered by the works team; one driven by Walkinshaw with Tetsu Ikuzawa and Peter Lovett, and the other by works driver Yojiro Terada, current BSCC champion Win Percy and Hiroshi Fushida. American Mazda dealer Pierre Honegger returned with his older RX-7. The smaller 1142cc size of its 12A twin-rotary engine put it in the lower GTU class – the only one entered at Le Mans this year – but despite that it was almost 30% heavier than the works cars, and the heaviest car in the field.

The biggest car in the field was the 6.4-litre Chevrolet Camaro entered by Billy Hagan's Stratagraph NASCAR team. The all-aluminium "stock-block" V8 put out 620 bhp and, despite the basic aerodynamics, could push the car up to 310 kp/h (195 mph) down the Mulsanne – though stopping it was a problem. Hagan scored a coup by getting triple-NASCAR champion Cale Yarborough. He joined a select group of drivers to have competed in the Daytona 500, Indianapolis 500 and Le Mans 24 Hours.

== Practice and Qualifying ==
The weather through the race-week was perfect, with warm sunny weather. Within the first session Ickx had thrown down the gauntlet with special Dunlop qualifying tyres, beating Bob Wollek's 1979 lap record by half a second with a 3:29.4. The team then stamped their authority on the race when Mass locked out the front row with a 3:32.6. Niedzwiedz was a distant third in the Joest Porsche (3:34.5), five seconds behind Ickx while Tambay (3:35.2) and Jaussaud (3:36.2) were next in the best of the Rondeaux. Sixth were the Whittingtons leading Group 5, while the WMs of Boutsen (3:37.9) and Dorchy (in 8th and 9th) were the fastest in Group C and GTP respectively. The new GRID-Lola qualified twelfth, unable to crack 280 kp/h (175 mph) slower. Despite having a top speed almost 70 kp/h (45 mph) slower than the Porsches, it was a credit to its handling that it was only 13 seconds down on lap-time. The 917-replica was a disappointment, back in 18th (3:46.5), and also suffering from lack of top-end speed, unable to get over 290 kp/h (180 mph). The original gearing ratios were too long, the tail gave too much drag and there was insufficient airflow to the engine. The Kremers swapped the engine for a more powerful 4.9-litre version that helped a little bit. Just behind them was Alain de Cadenet, with the new Cosworth DFL still needing shake-down testing.

Preston Henn's 935 (3:46.2) was the quickest GTX car in 17th, while the best of the BMWs was that of Hans Stuck in 21st (3:47.6, 15 seconds better than last year) and the best Ferrari was the NART entry in 29th (3:52.6). The young Formula 1 drivers put the 2-litre Lancias in the middle of the bigger Group 6 cars with Patrese qualifying 24th (3:48.1, also 15 seconds faster than their best qualifying in 1980). Despite several trips down the Mulsanne escape-road, Yarborough man-handled the big Camaro round into 39th (3:59.6) and the best Mazda only did a 4:04.8. In contrast to Group 5, it was the BMWs that dominated in Group 4, with the Marko car coming in 41st (4:00.1).

The average of the three fastest cars (Ickx, Mass and Joest) was 3:32.19, so the 130% maximum time would be 4:35.85. There were disappointing non-qualifiers: despite superior theoretical aerodynamics, both the Ardex and the Lola-Porsche were thwarted by engine issues. The heavy GTU Mazda had a torrid qualifying week. After the transporter lurched into a ditch en route to the circuit, shunting the car's engine bay, they also fell afoul of the 110% qualification rule (despite being 14 seconds faster than the previous year), as did the two factory-assisted Porsche 924s in Group 4 – embarrassingly put out by poor installation at the factory. Finally, the Z&W McLaren "special" never got close – with a dismal 5:13.0 its best time.

== Race ==
=== Start ===
Race-day was even hotter that earlier in the week and 170,000 spectators were present to see Jean-Marie Balestre, president of FISA drop the flag at 3pm. Ickx moved into the lead and at the end of the first lap had a clear margin over Pescarolo, Field and Joest. There was sensation straight away when Mass, in the second works Porsche, pitted after one lap, running on five cylinders with a chronic misfire. A second stop two laps later replaced a damaged spark-plug and left the German at the tail of the field. He was joined by de Villota in the GRID Lola with a faulty gear linkage. Then on lap 9, Rondeau pitted with a broken fuel-pump. The 90-minutes repairs took away any chance of a back-to-back victory. Three of the four WMs, all initially running in the top-10 also had early issues to pit for. The first fuel-stops started around 45 minutes into the race, with Ickx ceding the lead over to the more fuel-efficient Joest-Porsche, and in fact the Rondeaux could run for half an hour longer than the Porsche. The Camaro was the first retirement just before an hour was up, when Yarborough ran out of brakes at Arnage.

==== Accidents ====
At 4:15pm, the safety car had to be deployed for the first time. Thierry Boutsen had a massive accident just after the Hunaudières kink when the suspension on his WM broke at almost 350 kp/h (215 mph). When the rear-end collapsed, the car skated along the guardrail throwing debris for 150 metres, including into a marshal's post, killing Thierry Mabillat and critically injuring two other marshals and a gendarme. Amazingly, Boutsen was able to step away uninjured. The field continued circulating behind the safety cars for half an hour while the barrier was repaired without worries of racing action. While more cars pitted for fuel, the running order was Joest, Field, Bell, Tambay and Spice (Rondeaux), and De Cadenet dicing with Craft in the Dome.

However, just half an hour later, the safety car called out again. Once again down the Mulsanne straight a car had crashed – the Rondeau of Jean-Louis Lafosse. The lap before, while running third, he spun and clipped a guardrail, damaging the front chassis. The next lap as he grabbed fifth gear, about 1.5 kilometers down the straight the car suddenly slewed to the right, hitting another marshal's post, crushing the legs of the occupants, before spearing across into the other side. The combined impact almost broke the car in two and killed Lafosse instantly, as well as injuring two marshals. Lafosse was a veteran of ten Le Mans and had finished second in both 1975 for Ligier, and then 1976 for Mirage. This time the race neutralisation lasted twenty minutes. At this time it was Joest-Porsche in the lead, driven by Niedzwiedz. But soon after going back to green, he pitted with a cracked turbo-fan, handing the lead to the Interscope-Kremer 935. Tambay also had to pit, with the same problem in his Cosworth DFL as his team-leader, losing two hours in repairs.

The Kremer-917 had been working its way up the field slowly and was sitting ninth soon after 6pm when Lapeyre was forced on the grass overtaking a backmarker. That rough ride fractured an oil-pipe that eventually led to its retirement a few hours later. Going into the fourth hour Derek Bell was back on the same lap as Bill Whittington and soon overtook the Kremer 935. Trying to keep up the pace, the American suffered a burnt-out piston that soon led to their retirement. Having got back into the lead, the works Porsche would never be headed. For once Ickx would have a completely trouble-free run, with the car never missing a beat. Instead all the team's bad luck would fall on the sister car. The miserable weekend for WM continued when Dorchy's camera car had an engine-fire at Mulsanne corner. Then just on 7pm, Raulet collided with the Gabbiani's Lancia as they braked for the right-hander. This brought out the safety cars for a third time although, fortunately, neither driver was injured.

So, after 4 hours, and the number of problems many of the leading cars had undergone, the race order was well mixed: Bell (56) had a lap's lead over Migault's Rondeau with the Vegla 935J just ahead (54) of the NART Ferrari leading the GTX class. The Interscope-Kremer 935 (53) had slipped to fifth with its engine issues, about to be passed by the youngest Whittington brother in the Joest car, the Haran Rondeau and the remaining WM. Ninth, climbing back up the field, was the second Porsche 936 and when Haywood took over, he proceeded to take six positions over the next hour to be just a lap behind the Rondeau. After their turbo problems, the Joest Porsche had also been steadily coming back up the field. Then in the sixth hour, Whittington was going at speed when the front wheel came off. He limped back to the pits but the damage to the front end was too great to continue. After its bad start, the Lola had been running better until 8.40pm when de Villota dumped a puddle of oil at the Esses from a major engine leak, and the repairs took 3 hours.

=== Night ===
After the early demise of the 2-litre Porsche, the Lancia team allowed itself to ease off to guarantee maximum points. As others fell away, the works cars came up the field, all comfortably in the top-20. This was a relief after Gabbiani had been punted off early and the team-leading car of Heyer/Patrese/Ghinzani blew a head gasket and cracked a cylinder head at 5am. This left one works car and the Jolly Club car circulating. Similarly, the works Porsche GTs were running reliably in the top-20, with the Schurti/Rouse 924 (that started 48th) running just outside the top-10 throughout the night.

Around 10pm, the fuel-pump on Pescarolo's Rondeau broke again and, once again, 'Pesca' was left stranded out on the track after his efforts to restart the car flattened the battery. As dusk fell, Mass moved up into second, four laps behind Ickx, and the two 936s maintained a comfortable 1-2 position throughout the night, gradually extending their lead. At the eight-hour mark, Ickx had done 116 laps, 3 laps ahead of the sister car with Spice/Migault a further two laps behind. Fourth was now the Ivey 935 of Cooper/Wood/Bourgoignie (110) leading Group 5. A lap back was the other Rondeau GTP chased by the Pozzi Ferrari (leading GTX), with De Cadenet, the NART Ferrari (being slowed by clutch issues) and the Vegla Porsche another lap behind. Tenth (108) was the other Joest 935. Half the top-20 qualifiers had already retired and four more were now well down the field.

During the night, the Ivey car dropped down the field with electrical problems. The pit crew changed the nose section three times to try and fix the lights. Jean Rondeau had been languishing at the back of the field after their early fuel pump drama. Before midnight, he pitted with bad steering issues. Despite a careful examination the crew could not find the issue, but mindful of the suspension problems that befell Lafosse, the car was retired. The Joest car retired when an oil leak caused a spectacular engine-fire. Günther Steckkönig leapt out very quickly and avoided injury. About the same time the other 935J was delayed with a broken turbo rotor. Further delays the next morning with the exhaust system meant the Vegla car eventually finished tenth.

By the halfway point Ickx/Bell led (176) and there were four-laps gaps between the top three cars, while the second Rondeau had moved up to fourth (166). Soon after, the De Cadenet lost its fuel pump, costing 30 minutes to repair. But when the engine issues recurred in the morning, it could not be saved and Martin had to park it at Indianapolis.

=== Morning ===
The good run of the Porsches ended soon after 6am when Schuppan came into the pits without a clutch. The repair took over an hour to fix, dropping them down to 12th place before starting another drive back through the field. The Vegla Porsche was delayed by a broken turbo fan. At 7am, after 16 hours, Ickx/Bell (237 laps) now had a substantial 13-lap lead over the Rondeau with Haran/Schlesser/Streiff now up in second. The other Rondeau had been delayed by ignition problems that limited their maximum revs and speed, and later they also lost fourth gear. The Ivey Porsche (219) was being closed in by Haywood (218) in the recovering 936. From a strong drive through the night by Anny-Charlotte Verney, the Cooke-Woods Porsche was now leading the GTX-class just ahead of the NART Ferrari (218). Behind them, the Pozzi Ferrari (216), Porsche 944 of Röhrl/Barth (215) and 924 (Schurti/Rouse- 213) filled out the top-10.

After running as high as fifth during the night, De Cadenet had lost an hour getting the fuel pump replaced. It fell down the field and finally came to a halt, early in the morning, coming out of Mulsanne. In mid-morning, the NART Ferrari suffered a puncture that made it lose time getting back to the pits. Then Gurdjian went off at the Porsche Curves and its race was done. BMW had not had a good race, and three of the cars retired in the morning hours after running outside the top-20. It was ironic for Steve O'Rourke who had only taken over driving duties at 7.40am after arriving late, that his EMKA-BMW only lasted a couple more hours.

=== Finish and post-race ===
Schuppan had fought his way back up to fourth by noon when he drifted to a stop in the Porsche Curves with fuel-injection problems. Using his two-way radio to the pits, after 45 minutes he was able to get the car restarted and crawl back to the team. After another 45 minutes, and a new fuel-pump was fitted they rejoined at 1pm, eventually finishing down the field in 12th.

Bell drove the final two hours in the leading Porsche winning by 186km - the biggest winning margin in over a decade. But it was still a major exertion – on the rostrum Bell fainted from the heat and exhaustion. The two Rondeaux finished second and third, in formation, once again claiming the GTP class win. Fourth was the unheralded Ivey 935 winning Group 5 which, aside from a quarter hour spent on an alternator issue in the morning, had run well through the Sunday. After battling ignition issues at every fuel stop, Charles Pozzi's Ferrari team snatched an exciting GTX win in a back-and-forth duel with the Cooke-Woods 935 that finished barely 1.8 mi. behind. The sixth place for Anne-Charlotte Verney was the best result for a female driver since Odette Siko got fourth in 1932. Bob Garretson went on to win this year's World Championship of Drivers.

Only one of the four WMs finished – that of Mendez/Mathiot/Morin. It had got up to 12th at the halfway point but then broken front suspension took over an hour to repair, dropping them half a dozen places. As others retired, they eventually made it back to finish 13th. After all their tribulations (including another broken oil cooler and an off-road excursion), the Lola soldiered on to finish 15th . Thereafter, however, fortunes changed and the team won two of their three other WCM races, at Pergusa and Brands Hatch. Across three classes, only one of the BMWs finished and none had a particularly auspicious race with all suffering from clutch problems. Having pitted on the first lap of the race, the ORECA car of Alliot/Cecotto/Darniche made up four places in the afternoon, as others fell away, to finish 16th. Thierry Perrier repeated his Group 4 win in his ethanol-Porsche, as the only finisher in the class, coming home in 17th. The sole surviving Group 6 2-litre car, of Frenchmen Jean-Philippe Grand and Yves Courage, despite finishing last, had covered sufficient distance to win the Prize for Thermal Efficiency. The Renard-Delmas prototype had broken its suspension as night fell, then an overheating engine blew a head gasket in the morning. The team parked the car at 11am and came back on track to complete a final lap to take the flag, however, they were too far behind to be classified. The hard-luck story of the race was with the Bob Akin Porsche 935. Brand new, and with no spare engine, it had been practiced very conservatively. Then at race-pace it had lost 20 laps from a range of problems. But it had carried on and was tenth in the final hour. Going onto the final lap, Miller had to stop at Mulsanne corner with smoke filling the cockpit. Despite all his efforts, a short circuit had burned out the electrics and it would not restart.

The works Lancia of Alboreto/Cheever/Facetti had a good race and stayed the course to finish eighth, to claim the maximum points in the 2-litre class. A surprising 1–2 overall victory at Watkins Glen later in the year was good enough to beat Porsche for the World Championship for the second year running.

The new safety car race neutralisation system had had its teething problems, with inconsistent radio communications between the officials and the three cars, with restarts being a bit chaotic. The two fatalities cast a pall over the race celebrations. As well as being a record-breaking victory for Ickx it was also a sixth win for Porsche (now second behind the nine wins of Ferrari), and a fine commemoration of the 50th year since the marque's first Le Mans. Ickx commented:

" I gave up Formula 1, retired, because I was tired of racing. But to come back to this; well it's like coming here fifteen years ago”.

Porsche's ease of success with the new engine confirmed the racing division's decision to adopt it for their new Group C project – the Porsche 956

== Official results ==
=== Finishers ===
Results taken from Quentin Spurring's book, officially licensed by the ACO
Class Winners are in Bold text.

Pos	Class	No.	Team	Drivers	Chassis	Engine	Tyre	Laps
1	**Gr.6**; **S +2.0**	**11**	**(West Germany) Porsche System**	**(Belgium) Jacky Ickx** **(United Kingdom) Derek Bell**	Porsche 936/81	Porsche 935/82 2.6L F6 turbo	D	355
2	**GTP** **(3.0)**	**8**	**(France) Jean Rondeau**	**(France) Jean-Louis Schlesser** **(France) Philippe Streiff** **(France) Jacky Haran**	Rondeau M379C	Cosworth DFV 3.0 L V8	G	341
3	GTP (3.0)	7	(France) Jean Rondeau	(United Kingdom) Gordon Spice (France) François Migault	Rondeau M379C	Cosworth DFV 3.0 L V8	G	336
4	**Gr.5**; **SP +2.0**	**55**	**(Belgium) C. Bourgoignie** **(United Kingdom) Charles Ivey Racing** (private entrant)	**(United Kingdom) John Cooper** **(United Kingdom) Dudley Wood** **(Belgium) Claude Bourgoignie**	Porsche 935-K3/79	Porsche 930 3.1L F6 turbo	D	331
5	**IMSA**; **GTX**	**47**	**(France) Charles Pozzi S.A.**	**(France) Claude Ballot-Léna** **(France) Jean-Claude Andruet**	Ferrari 512BB/LM	Ferrari 4.9L F12	M	329
6	IMSA; GTX	42	(United States) Cooke-Woods Racing	(United States) Bob Garretson (United States) Ralph Kent-Cooke (France) Anne-Charlotte Verney	Porsche 935-K3/80	Porsche 930 3.2L F6 twin-turbo	G	328
7	GTP (+3.0)	1	(West Germany) Porsche System	(West Germany) Jürgen Barth (West Germany) Walter Röhrl	Porsche 944 LM	Porsche 2.5L S4 turbo	D	324
8	**Gr.5**; **SP 2.0**	**65**	**(Italy) Martini Racing**	**(Italy) Michele Alboreto** **(United States) Eddie Cheever** **(Italy) Carlo Facetti**	Lancia Montecarlo Turbo	Lancia 1425cc S4 turbo	P	323
9	IMSA; GTX	46	(Belgium) Rennod Racing	(Belgium) Pierre Dieudonné (Belgium) Jean Xhenceval (Belgium) Jean-Paul Libert	Ferrari 512BB/LM	Ferrari 4.9L F12	G	321
10	Gr.5; SP +2.0	60	(West Germany) Vegla Racing Team	(West Germany) Dieter Schornstein (West Germany) Harald Grohs (West Germany) Götz von Tschirnhaus	Porsche 935J	Porsche 930 3.0L F6 twin-turbo	D	321
11	**IMSA**; **GTO**	**36**	**(West Germany) Porsche System**	**(Liechtenstein) Manfred Schurti** **(United Kingdom) Andy Rouse**	Porsche 924 Carrera GTR	Porsche 2.0L S4 turbo	D	316
12	Gr.6; S +2.0	12	(West Germany) Porsche System	(West Germany) Jochen Mass (Australia) Vern Schuppan (United States) Hurley Haywood	Porsche 936/81	Porsche 935/82 2.6L F6turbo	D	313
13	GTP (+3.0)	4	(France) WM AEREM	(France) Denis Morin (United States) Charles Mendez (France) Xavier Mathiot	WM P79/80	Peugeot PRV ZNS4 2.7L; V6 twin-turbo	M	308
14	Gr.5; SP 2.0	68	(Italy) Jolly Club	(Italy) Martino Finotto (Italy) Giorgio Pianta (Italy) Giorgio Schön	Lancia Montecarlo Turbo	Lancia 1425cc S4 turbo	P	293
15	Gr.6; S +2.0	18	(United Kingdom) GRID Team Lola	(Spain) Emilio de Villota (United Kingdom) Guy Edwards (Spain) Juan Fernández	Lola T600	Cosworth DFL 3.3 L V8	G	288
16	Gr.5; SP +2.0	51	ORECA; BMW Italie-France	(France) Philippe Alliot (France) Bernard Darniche (Venezuela) Johnny Cecotto	BMW M1	BMW M88 3.5L S6	D	278
17	**Gr.4**; **GT**	**70**	**(France) T. Perrier** (private entrant)	**(France) Thierry Perrier** **(France) Valentin Bertapelle** **(France) Bernard Salam**	Porsche 934	Porsche 3.0L F6 turbo (Ethanol)	M	275
18	**Gr.6**; **S 2.0**	**31**	**(France) J.-P. Grand** (private entrant)	**(France) Jean-Philippe Grand** **(France) Yves Courage**	Lola T298	BMW M12 2.0L S4	G	273
N/C*	Gr.6; S 2.0	33	(France) Compagnie Primagaz (private entrant)	(France) Pierre Yver (France) Michel Dubois (France) Jacques Heuclin	Lola T298	BMW M12 2.0L S4	G	204
N/C*	Gr.6; S 2.0	32	(France) Écurie Renard-Delmas	(France) Louis Descartes (France) Hervé Bayard	Renard-Delmas D1	Simca-ROC 2.0L S4	G	188

- Note *: Not Classified because did not cover sufficient distance (70% of the winner) by the race's end.

=== Did Not Finish ===
Pos	Class	No	Team	Drivers	Chassis	Engine	Tyre	Laps	Reason
DNF	IMSA; GTX	43	(United States) Bob Akin Motor Racing	(United States) Bob Akin (United States) Paul Miller (United States) Craig Siebert	Porsche 935-K3/80	Porsche 930 3.0L F6 turbo	G	320	Electrics (24hr)
DNF	Gr.5; SP +2.0	57	(Switzerland) C. Haldi (private entrant)	(Switzerland) Claude Haldi (United Kingdom) Mark Thatcher (France) Hervé Poulain	Porsche 934/5	Porsche 930 3.0L F6 turbo	D	260	Accident damage (22hr)
DNF	IMSA; GTX	49	(United States) North American Racing Team	(France) Alain Cudini (France) Philippe Gurdjian (United States) John Morton	Ferrari 512BB/LM	Ferrari 4.9L F12	M	247	Accident (20hr)
DNF	Gr.5; SP +2.0	53	(United Kingdom) EMKA Productions	(United Kingdom) Steve O'Rourke (United Kingdom) David Hobbs (Republic of Ireland) Eddie Jordan	BMW M1	BMW M88 3.5L S6	D	236	Engine (22hr)
DNF	Gr.4; GT	72	(France) BMW Zol'Auto	(France) François Sérvanin (France) Laurent Ferrier (France) Pierre-François Rousselot	BMW M1	BMW M88 3.5L S6	D	212	Engine (21hr)
DNF	Gr.6; S +2.0	20	(United Kingdom) A. de Cadenet (private entrant)	(United Kingdom) Alain de Cadenet (Belgium) Jean-Michel Martin (Belgium) Philippe Martin	DeCadenet-Lola LM78	Cosworth DFL 3.3 L V8	D	210	Engine (19hr)
DNF	Gr.5; SP +2.0	52	(Switzerland) Würth-Lubrifilm Team Sauber	(Austria) Dieter Quester (Switzerland) Marc Surer (Canada) David Deacon	BMW M1	BMW M88 3.5L S6	D	207	Engine (20hr)
DNF	Gr.5; SP 2.0	66	(Italy) Martini Racing	(Italy) Riccardo Patrese (West Germany) Hans Heyer (Italy) Piercarlo Ghinzani	Lancia Montecarlo Turbo	Lancia 1425cc S4 turbo	P	186	Engine (16hr)
DNF	Gr.6; S +2.0	21	(United Kingdom) Dorset Racing Associates (United Kingdom) A. de Cadenet (private entrant)	(Republic of Ireland) Martin Birrane (United Kingdom) Nick Faure (Republic of Ireland) Vivian Candy	DeCadenet-Lola LM76	Cosworth DFV 3.0 L V8	D	171	Transmission (19hr)
DNF	Gr.6; S +2.0	23	(Japan) Dome Co. Ltd	(United Kingdom) Chris Craft (United Kingdom) Bob Evans	Dome Zero RL80	Cosworth DFV 3.0L V8	D	154	Engine (15hr)
DNF	IMSA; GTX	40	(West Germany) Joest Racing	(West Germany) Günther Steckkönig (Colombia) Mauricio de Narváez (United States) Kenper Miller	Porsche 935J	Porsche 930 2.8L F6 turbo	D	152	Fire (13hr)
DNF	IMSA; GTX	48	(United Kingdom) S. Phillips (private entrant)	(United Kingdom) Simon Phillips (United Kingdom) Mike Salmon (United States) Steve Earle	Ferrari 512BB/LM	Ferrari 4.9L F12	M	140	Transmission (12hr)
DNF	IMSA; GTX	45	(Italy) Scuderia Supercar; Bellancauto	(Italy) Fabrizio Violati (Italy) Maurizio Flammini (Italy) Duilio Truffo	Ferrari 512BBB	Ferrari 4.9L F12	M	118	Transmission (15hr)
DNF	Gr.6; S +2.0	22	(Switzerland) André Chevalley Racing (private entrant)	(Switzerland) André Chevalley (France) Patrick Gaillard (France) Bruno Sotty	ACR 80B	Cosworth DFV 3.0L V8	G	114	Clutch (11hr)
DNF	IMSA; GTO	37	(Japan) Mazdaspeed (United Kingdom) Tom Walkinshaw Racing	(Japan) Tetsu Ikuzawa (United Kingdom) Tom Walkinshaw (United Kingdom) Peter Lovett	Mazda RX-7 253i	Mazda 13B 1308cc twin-rotary	D	107	Clutch (12hr)
DNF	Gr.6; S 2.0	30	(France) J.-M. Lemerle (private entrant)	(France) Jean-Marie Lemerle (Morocco) Max Cohen-Olivar (France) Alain Levié	Lola T298	BMW M12 2.0L S4	G	104	Electrics (18hr)
DNF	Gr.6; S +2.0	27	(United Kingdom) I. Bracey (private entrant)	(United Kingdom) Tiff Needell (United Kingdom) Tony Trimmer	Ibec P6	Cosworth DFV 3.0L V8	D	95	Engine (15hr)
DNF	Gr.6; S +2.0	10	(West Germany) Porsche Kremer Racing	(France) Bob Wollek (France) Xavier Lapeyre (France) Guy Chasseuil	Porsche 917K/81	Porsche 4.9L F12	D	82	Engine (8hr)
DNF	Gr.6; S +2.0	14	(West Germany) Joest Racing	(West Germany) Reinhold Joest (United States) Dale Whittington (West Germany) Klaus Niedzwiedz	Porsche 908/J80	Porsche 911/78 2.1L; F6 turbo	D	80	Accident (6hr)
DNF	Gr.6; S +2.0	24	(France) Jean Rondeau	(France) Jean Rondeau (France) Jean-Pierre Jaussaud	Rondeau M379C	Cosworth DFL 3.3 L V8	G	58	Accident damage (10hr)
DNF	IMSA; GTX	50	(West Germany) BASF Cassetten; Team GS Sport	(West Germany) Hans-Joachim Stuck (France) Jean-Pierre Jarier (West Germany) Helmut Henzler	BMW M1	BMW M88 3.5L S6	D	57	Accident damage (5hr)
DNF	Gr.5; SP +2.0	59	(West Germany) Porsche Kremer Racing (United States) Interscope Racing	(United States) Ted Field (United States) Bill Whittington (United States) Don Whittington	Porsche 935-K3/80	Porsche 930 3.2L F6 turbo	G	57	Engine (5hr)
DNF	Gr.C	83	(France) WM AEREM	(France) Marcel "Max" Mamers (France) Jean-Daniel Raulet	WM P81	Peugeot PRV ZNS4 2.7L; V6 twin-turbo	M	50	Accident damage (5hr)
DNF	Gr.5; SP 2.0	69	(Sweden) Tuff-Kote Dinol Racing (private entrant)	(Sweden) Jan Lundgårdh (West Germany) Axel Plankenhorn (United Kingdom) Mike Wilds	Porsche 935-K3/ L1	Porsche 1425cc F6 turbo	D	49	Engine (6hr)
DNF	Gr.4; GT	71	(Austria) Marko RSM (private entrant)	(West Germany) Christian Danner (West Germany) Peter Oberndofer (West Germany) Prinz Leopold von Bayern	BMW M1	BMW M88 3.5L S6	D	49	Engine (8hr)
DNF	Gr.5; SP +2.0	61	(West Germany) Weralit Racing Team	(West Germany) Edgar Dören (West Germany) Jürgen Lässig (West Germany) Gerhard Holup	Porsche 935-K3/79	Porsche 930 3.0L F6 turbo	D	48	Engine (8hr)
DNF	Gr.5; SP 2.0	67	(Italy) Martini Racing	(Italy) Beppe Gabbiani (Italy) Emanuele Pirro	Lancia Montecarlo Turbo	Lancia 1425cc S4 turbo	P	47	Accident (5hr)
DNF	GTP (+3.0)	5	(France) WM AEREM	(France) Guy Fréquelin (France) Roger Dorchy (France) Xavier Mathiot	WM P79/80	Peugeot PRV ZNS4 2.7L; V6 twin-turbo	M	46	Engine fire (4hr)
DNF	IMSA; GTX	41	(United States) Thunderbird Swap Shop (private entrant)	(United States) Preston Henn (United States) Mike Chandler (France) Marcel Mignot	Porsche 935-K3/80	Porsche 930 3.0L F6 turbo	D	45	Engine (6hr)
DNF	Gr.6; S +2.0	26	(France) Jean Rondeau	(France) Henri Pescarolo (France) Patrick Tambay	Rondeau M379C	Cosworth DFL 3.3 L V8	G	41	Fuel pump (8hr)
DNF	Gr.4; GT	73	(France) Eminence Racing Team (private entrant)	(France) Jacques Alméras (France) Jean-Marie Alméras	Porsche 924 Carrera GTR	Porsche 2.0L S4 turbo	M	30	Engine (6hr)
DNF	Gr.6; S +2.0	25	(France) Jean Rondeau	(France) Jean Ragnotti (France) Jean-Louis Lafosse	Rondeau M379C	Cosworth DFV 3.0 L V8	G	28	Fatal accident (3hr)
DNF	IMSA; GTO	38	(Japan) Mazdaspeed (United Kingdom) Tom Walkinshaw Racing	(Japan) Yojiro Terada (Japan) Hiroshi Fushida (United Kingdom) Win Percy	Mazda RX-7 253i	Mazda 13B 1308cc twin-rotary	D	25	Transmission (4hr)
DNF	Gr.C	82	(France) WM AEREM	(Belgium) Thierry Boutsen (France) Serge Saulnier (France) Michel Pignard	WM P81	Peugeot PRV ZNS4 2.7L; V6 twin-turbo	M	15	Accident (3hr)
DNF	IMSA; GTO	35	(United States) Stratagraph Inc.	(United States) Cale Yarborough (United States) Billy Hagan (United States) Bill Cooper	Chevrolet Camaro	Chevrolet 6.4L V8	G	13	Accident (2hr)

=== Did Not Start ===
Pos	Class	No	Team	Drivers	Chassis	Engine	Tyre	Reason
DNQ	Gr.6; S +2.0	16	(France) M. Sardou (private entrant)	(France) Patrick Perrier (France) Michel Lateste	Ardex S80	BMW M88 3.5L S6	M	Did not qualify
DNQ	Gr.6; S +2.0	17	(United States) Cooke-Woods Racing	(United Kingdom) Brian Redman (United States) Bobby Rahal	Lola T600	Porsche 930/72 3.0L; F6 turbo	G	Did not qualify
RES	IMSA; GTU	39	(United States) Z & W Enterprises Inc.	(United States) Fred Stiff (Belgium) Dirk Vermeersch (United States) Ray Ratcliff	Mazda RX-7	Mazda 12A 1146cc twin-rotary	D	Did not qualify
DNQ	Gr.5; SP +2.0	62	(France) "Ségolen" (private entrant)	(France) "Ségolen" (André Gahinet) (France) Jacques Guérin (France) Christian Bussi	Porsche 935	Porsche 3.0L F6 turbo	D	Did not qualify
RES	Gr.4; GT	74	Porsche Cars Australia	(Australia) Peter Brock (New Zealand) Jim Richards (Australia) Colin Bond	Porsche 924 Carrera GTR	Porsche 2.0L S4 turbo	D	Did not qualify
RES	Gr.4; GT	75	(United Kingdom) Porsche System Canon	(United Kingdom) Richard Lloyd (United Kingdom) Tony Dron	Porsche 924 Carrera GTR	Porsche 2.0L S4 turbo	D	Did not qualify
DNQ	IMSA; GTP	90	(United States) Z & W Enterprises Inc.	(Belgium) Hervé Regout (France) Michel Elkoubi	McLaren M12/6B GT	Chevrolet 5.7L V8	G	Did not qualify
DNA	GTP (+3.0)	6	(France) WM AEREM	(France) Denis Morin (France) Charles Mendez	WM P79/80	Peugeot PRV ZNS4 2.7L; V6 twin-turbo	M	Converted to Group C

=== Class Winners ===
Class	Winning car	Winning drivers
Group 6 S Sports Prototype over 2-litre	#11 Porsche 936/81	Ickx / Bell *
Group 6 S Sports Prototype up to 2-litre	#31 Lola T298	Grand / Courage
Group 5 SP Special Production over 2-litre	#55 Porsche 935-K3/79	Cooper / Wood / Bourgoignie *
Group 5 SP Special Production up to 2-litre	#65 Lancia Montecarlo Turbo	Alboreto / Cheever / Facetti *
Group 4 GTS Special GT	#70 Porsche 934	Perrier / Bertapelle / Salam
GTP Le Mans GT Prototype	#8 Rondeau M379C	Schlesser / Streiff / Haran *
IMSA GTP IMSA GTP	no starters	
IMSA GTX IMSA GT Experimental	#47 Ferrari 512BB/LM	Ballot-Léna / Andruet *
IMSA GTO IMSA GT over 2.5-litre	#36 Porsche 924 Carrera GTR	Schurti / Rouse *
IMSA GTU IMSA GT under 2.5-litre	no starters	
Group C	no finishers	

- Note: setting a new class distance record.

=== Index of Energy Efficiency ===
Pos	Class	No	Team	Drivers	Chassis	Score
1	Gr.6; S 2.0	31	(France) J.-P. Grand (private entrant)	(France) Jean-Philippe Grand (France) Yves Courage	Lola T298	0.754
2	GTP (3.0)	8	(France) Jean Rondeau	(France) Jean-Louis Schlesser (France) Philippe Streiff (France) Jacky Haran	Rondeau M379C	0.698
3	GTP (3.0)	7	(France) Jean Rondeau	(United Kingdom) Gordon Spice (France) François Migault	Rondeau M379C	0.679
4	Gr.6; S +2.0	11	(West Germany) Porsche System	(Belgium) Jacky Ickx (United Kingdom) Derek Bell	Porsche 936/81	0.632
5	IMSA; GTO	36	(West Germany) Porsche System	**(Liechtenstein) Manfred Schurti** **(United Kingdom) Andy Rouse**	Porsche 924 Carrera GTR	0.612
6	IMSA; GTX	46	(Belgium) Rennod Racing	(Belgium) Pierre Dieudonné (Belgium) Jean Xhenceval (Belgium) Jean-Paul Libert	Ferrari 512BB/LM	0.552
7	IMSA; GTX	47	(France) Charles Pozzi S.A.	(France) Claude Ballot-Léna (France) Jean-Claude Andruet	Ferrari 512BB/LM	0.506
8	Gr.5; SP 2.0	65	(Italy) Martini Racing	(Italy) Michele Alboreto (United States) Eddie Cheever (Italy) Carlo Facetti	Lancia Montecarlo Turbo	0.499
9	GTP (+3.0)	1	(West Germany) Porsche System	(West Germany) Jürgen Barth (West Germany) Walter Röhrl	Porsche 944 LM	0.478
10	GTP (+3.0)	4	(France) WM AEREM	(France) Denis Morin (United States) Charles Mendez (France) Xavier Mathiot	WM P79/80	0.454

- Note: Only the top ten positions are included in this set of standings.

=== Statistics ===
Taken from Quentin Spurring's book, officially licensed by the ACO

- Pole Position –J. Ickx, #11 Porsche 936/81– 3:29.4secs; 234.21 km/h (145.53 mph)
- Fastest Lap –J. Mass, #12 Porsche 936/81 – 3:34.0secs; 229.23 km/h (142.44 mph)
- Winning Distance – 4,825.35 km (2,998.33 mi)
- Winner's Average Speed – 201.06 km/h (124.93 mph)
- Attendance – 170 000

Citations
