= Wayne Reutimann =

American racing driver (born 1944)

- Born: December 31, 1944 (age 81) Zephyrhills, Florida, U.S.
- Car number: 00jr

Championship titles
- 1965, 1973 Florida Governor's Cup; 1976 New York State Fair Champion

Wayne Reutimann (born December 31, 1944) is an American retired racing driver from Zephyrhills, Florida. Never one to turn down a challenge, he successfully competed in dirt Modified, aslphalt Late Model, and Sprint cars.

== Racing career ==
Wayne Reutimann followed his older brother Buzzie into racing with one of their father's old Modifieds, a 1935 Chevy coupe numbered as 00 jr. and powered by a GMC six-cylinder engine. Reutimann moved on to asphalt Late Models competing success fully at the Golden Gate and Sarasota-Bradenton Speedways in Florida, and in 1965 gained notoriety by becoming the youngest winner of the Florida State Late Model Championship with a half-car-length victory over Bobby Allison at Golden Gate.

From 1972 to 1977 Reutimann went north to try his hand at dirt-track Modified competition and became a consistent winner at New Jersey's East Windsor Speedway and Pennsylvania's Nazareth Speedway. He claimed the Orange County Fair Speedway (Middletown, New York) track championships in 1975 and 1977, and also won the 1976 New York State Fair Championship at the Syracuse Mile.

Wayne Reutimann. was inducted into the Northeast Dirt Modified Hall of Fame in 2008.
