= Frank Cozze =

American Dirt Modified racing driver (born 1955)

- Born: Frank A. Cozze; September 22, 1955 (age 71) Wind Gap, Pennsylvania, U.S.
- Retired: 2021
- Debut season: 1974

Modified racing career
- Car number: 44
- Championships: 4
- Wins: 163

Previous series
- Sprint car, SpeedSTR

Frank Cozze (September 22, 1955) is an American Dirt Modified and sprint car racing driver, currently credited with over 300 career wins.

== Racing career ==
Frank Cozze began racing in 1974 by rebuilding up a wrecked car his father fielded for Budd Olsen. He was named the rookie champion at the Flemington Speedway, New Jersey, and in 1985 claimed that track's overall championship.

Cozze went on to become track champion at the New Jersey's East Windsor Speedway and New Egypt Speedway, and to successfully compete in the mid-Atlantic region venues including Big Diamond Speedway (Pottsville), Grandview Speedway (Bechtelsville), and Nazareth Speedway in Pennsylvania; Hagerstown Speedway, Maryland; and Brewerton Speedway and Orange County Fair Speedway (Middletown) in New York.

Cozze won the Super Dirt Week main event in 2008 at the Syracuse Mile, and was inducted into the Northeast Dirt Modified Hall of Fame in 2013. He joined his father, Dick Cozze, as an inductee in the Eastern Motorsports Press Association Hall of Fame in 2026.
