= Gerald Chamberlain =

American racing driver

- Born: Gerald Chamberlain; April 18, 1941 (age 85) Everett, Pennsylvania, U.S.
- Retired: 1981
- Debut season: 1960

Modified racing career
- Car number: 31, 76, 707
- Championships: 13
- Wins: 600+

Championship titles
- 1974 New York State Fair Champion

NASCAR Cup Series career
- 2 races run over 1 year
- Best finish: 89th (1969)
- First race: 1969 Rebel 400 (Darlington)
- Last race: 1969 World 600 (Charlotte)
Wins	Top tens	Poles
0	1	0

NASCAR Late Model Sportsman Series
- First Race: 1967 Permatex 300 (Daytona)
- Last Race: 1969 Permatex 300 (Daytona)

Gerald Chamberlain (born April 18, 1941) is an American retired stock car racing driver from Everett, Pennsylvania. Chamberlain won 22 feature events at the Reading Fairgrounds Speedway (Pennsylvania) in 1971. He broke the track record the next year with 31 victories in one year.

== Racing career ==
Chamberlain made two appearances in the NASCAR Grand National Series in 1969, with a best finish of tenth. He also competed in three Daytona 300s with a highest finish of 12th.

Chamberlain spent the majority of his career racing in the Modified division, winning championships at nine different tracks: South Penn in Everett, Penn National in Grant, Hesston, Reading, and Jennerstown Speedways, all in Pennsylvania; Potomac Valley Speedway in Fort Ashby, West Virginia; Hagerstown Speedway, Maryland; Winchester Speedway, Virginia; and Flemington Speedway, New Jersey. In 1973, Chamberlain captured the first of two Eastern States 200 events at Orange County Fair Speedway in New York.

Chamberlain was also a respected race car builder, specializing in late models and Ford engines.

Chamberlain was inducted into the Eastern Motorsports Press Association and the Northeast Dirt Modified Halls of Fame.

== Motorsports career results ==
=== NASCAR ===
(key) (Bold – Pole position awarded by qualifying time. Italics – Pole position earned by points standings or practice time. * – Most laps led.)

==== Grand National Series ====
NASCAR Grand National Series results
Year	Team	No.	Make	1	2	3	4	5	6	7	8	9	10	11	12	13	14	15	16	17	18	19	20	21	22	23	24	25	26	27	28	29	30	31	32	33	34	35	36	37	38	39	40	41	42	43	44	45	46	47	48	49	50	51	52	53	54	NGNC	Pts	Ref
1969	Lyle Stelter	56	Mercury	MGR	MGY	RSD	DAY	DAY	DAY	CAR	AUG	BRI	ATL	CLB	HCY	GPS	RCH	NWS	MAR	AWS	DAR; 10	BLV	LGY	CLT; 38	MGR	SMR	MCH	KPT	GPS	NCF	DAY	DOV	TPN	TRN	BLV	BRI	NSV	SMR	ATL	MCH	SBO	BGS	AWS	DAR	HCY	RCH	TAL	CLB	MAR	NWS	CLT	SVH	AUG	CAR	JFC	MGR	TWS	89th	452.63	
