= Orange County Fair Speedway =

Speedway held in Middletown, Orange County, New York

"The House of Power"
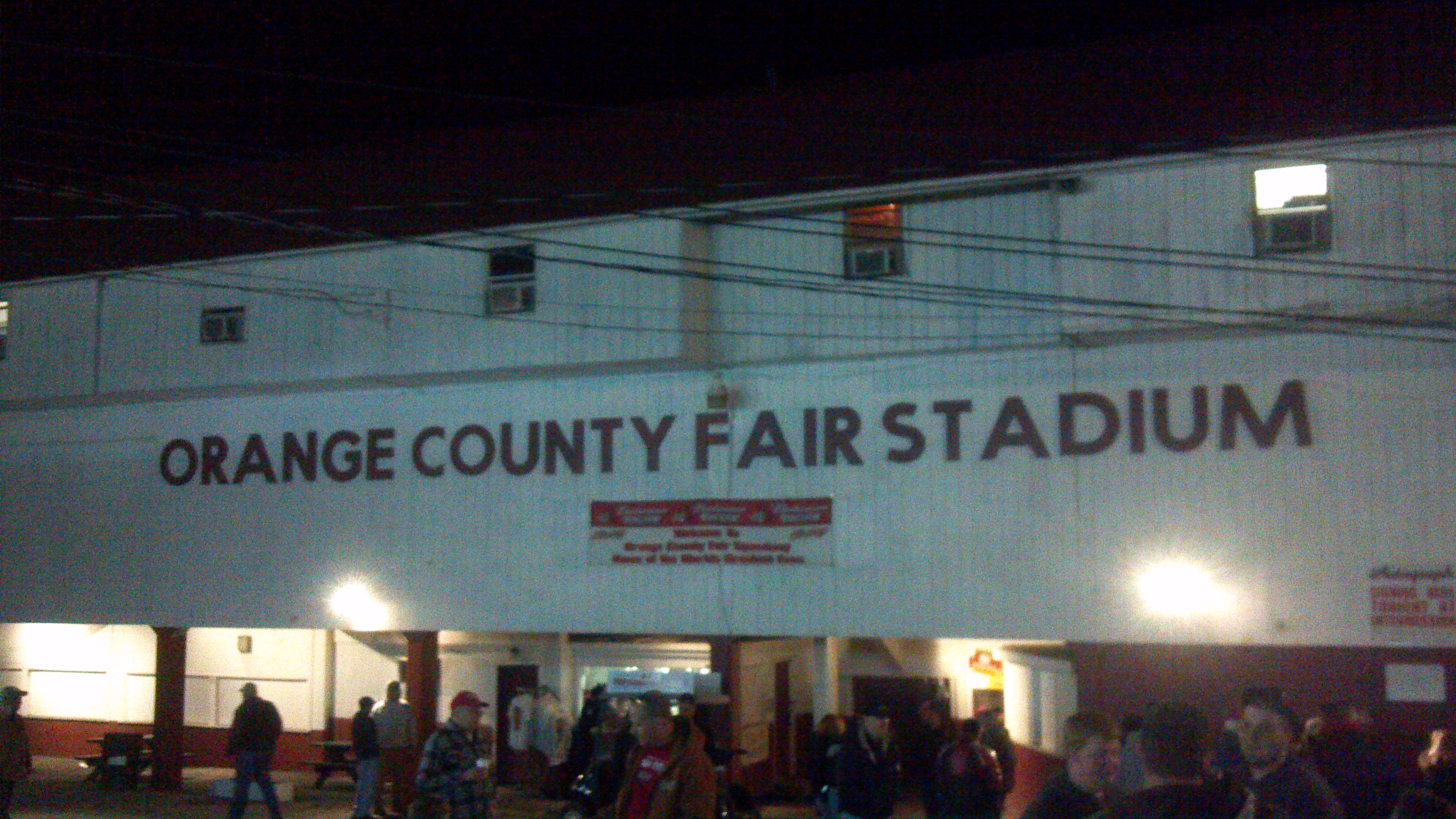
- Orange County Fair Speedway Grandstand
- Location: Middletown, New York, at 239 Wisner Avenue, Middletown, New York 10940, United States
- Coordinates: 41°26′52″N 74°23′36″W
- Capacity: 8,000
- Owner: Mike Gurda IV
- Operator: Independent
- Broke ground: 1857 - For Horse Racing
- Opened: August 16, 1919 - First Auto Race
- Construction cost: Unknown
- Architect: Unknown
- Former names: Ogden Tract, Harry Clay Oval, Victory Speedway
- Major events: Eastern States 200; Eastern States 100; Hard Clay Open; Street Stock Shootout
- Website: http://www.orangecountyfairspeedway.net/index.html

Oval
- Surface: Dirt
- Length: 0.625 mi (1.006 km)
- Turns: 4
- Banking: Semi-Banked
- Race lap record: 0:16.083 (139.899 MPH) (Joey Saldana, Joey Saldana Racing, September 24th, 2008, WoO Sprint Car)

Orange County Fair Speedway is a 0.625 mi (1.006 km) dirt oval speedway in Middletown, Orange County, New York. The facility used to hold weekly stock car races and demolition derbies during the summer months. The track was built in 1857 for horse racing at the Orange County Fair and staged its first automobile race on August 16, 1919. The fair began as an agricultural exhibit in 1843 and was permanently located in the Wallkill–Middletown area in 1857. The speedway is located at 239 Wisner Avenue in Middletown on land which was known as The Ogden Tract in the mid-1850s. It was originally a half-mile horse racing track known as the Harry Clay Oval, named after a race horse that was famous at that time. Over the years, the track was widened and lengthened to a true 5/8-mile race track.

== History ==
In 1913, the Orange County Fair Society director, George Martin, who was an auto racing enthusiast, brought the idea of replacing the horses with automobiles to the board of directors but his proposition was denied for six straight years. Martin's idea was vetoed by the board but he was stubborn and he argued, talked and persisted until he finally convinced the board of directors to at least try it in 1919. The race was witnessed by 5,000 in attendance and was won by James Benedict driving a Benedict Special powered by a Deusenberg motor. 1924 saw the track resurfaced with clay from a nearby pond, which was found to be soft enough for the horse races that still occasionally took place on the track yet tacky and stable enough for auto racing. This "hard clay" allowed for the track to gain a reputation for its speed that persists to this day.

Auto racing continued at the speedway each year until the beginning of World War II when motorsports nationwide was suspended due to shortages of gasoline, iron, steel, rubber and aluminum. Weekly stock car racing began on April 16, 1950 and has continued every week since that time. In 1946, after World War II ended, the Harry Clay Oval was renamed Victory Speedway, Inc and saw the return of ARDC Midget racing. Stock car racing officially began at the speedway on September 18, 1948 as Rocky Dinatale is credited with the first-ever stock car win. The first fully contested championship season began on April 16, 1950 and the first race of the season was won by Tex Enright driving # 407 Modified coupe. Enright would later go on to be one of the most popular flagmen in dirt track auto racing.

Today, the Orange County Fair Speedway still operates on a weekly basis from April to September. Nicknamed "The House of Power", the Orange County Fair Speedway boasts a long history of dirt track auto racing where many legendary northeast dirt track drivers such as Frankie Schneider, Ray Brown, Will Cagle and Buzzie Reutimann. Drivers of today are still testing their limits on the 5/8-mile track, like Brett Hearn, Rich Eurich, Danny Johnson and Jerry Higbie.

In addition to auto racing, the facility will begin a new era of motocross racing on a race track built in 2013 outside of turns 3 and 4.

On November 26, 2014, speedway owner Mike Gurda announced that in 2015 the speedway will run as an independent track and end its sanction with DIRTcar Northeast.

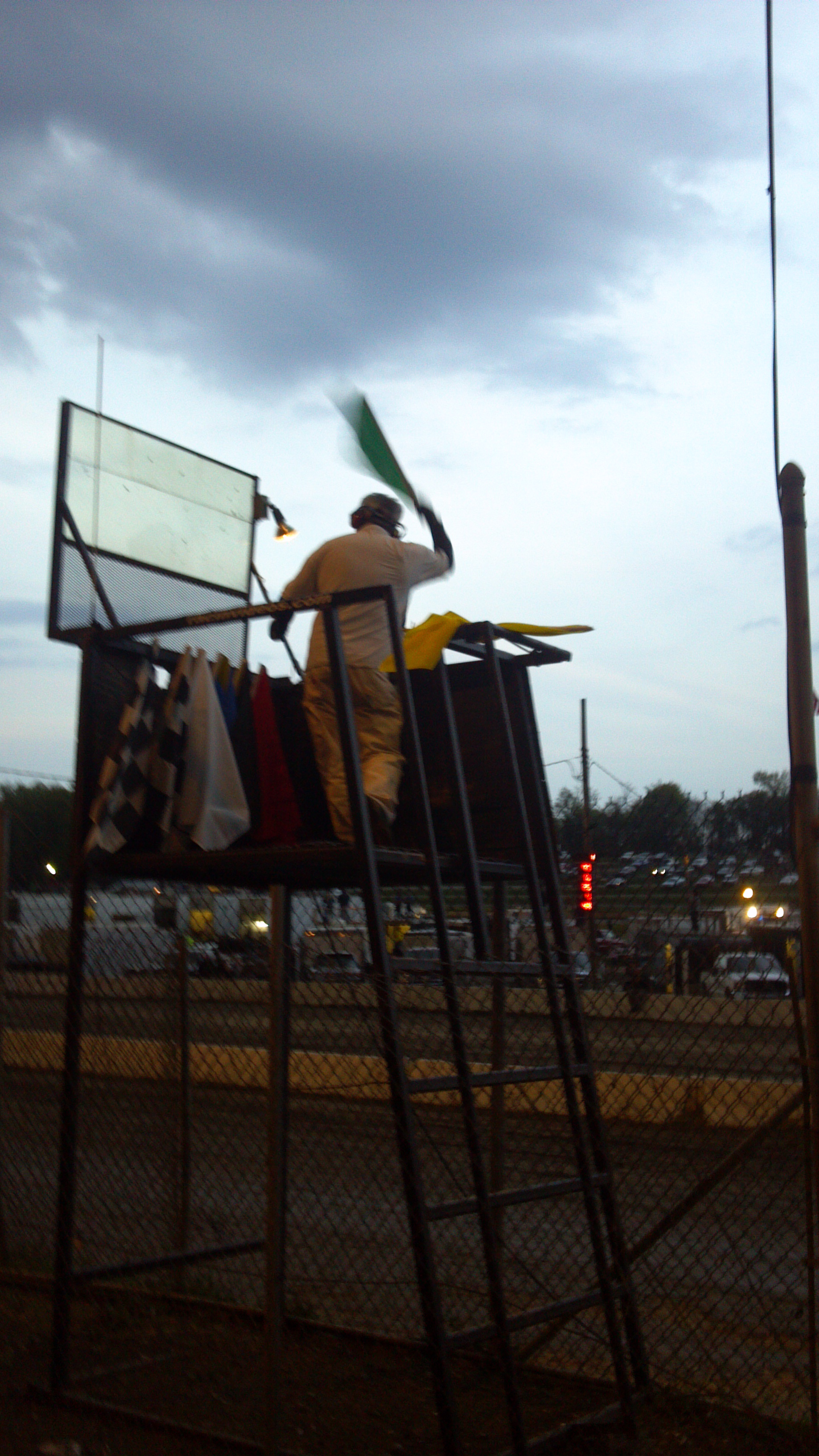

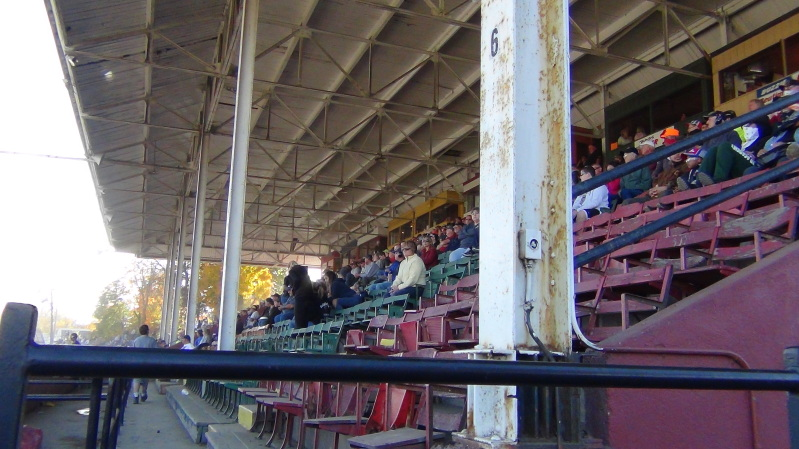

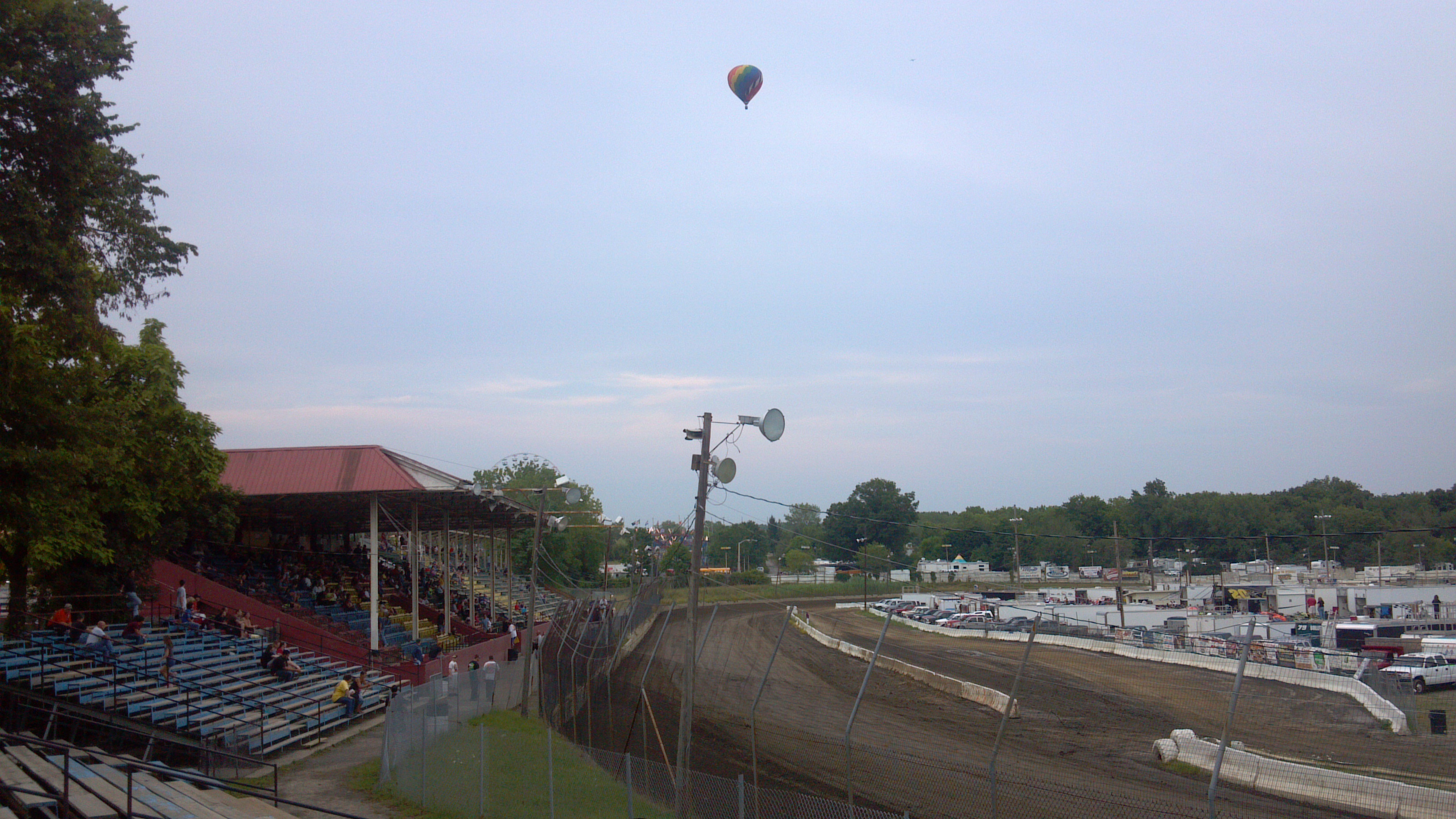

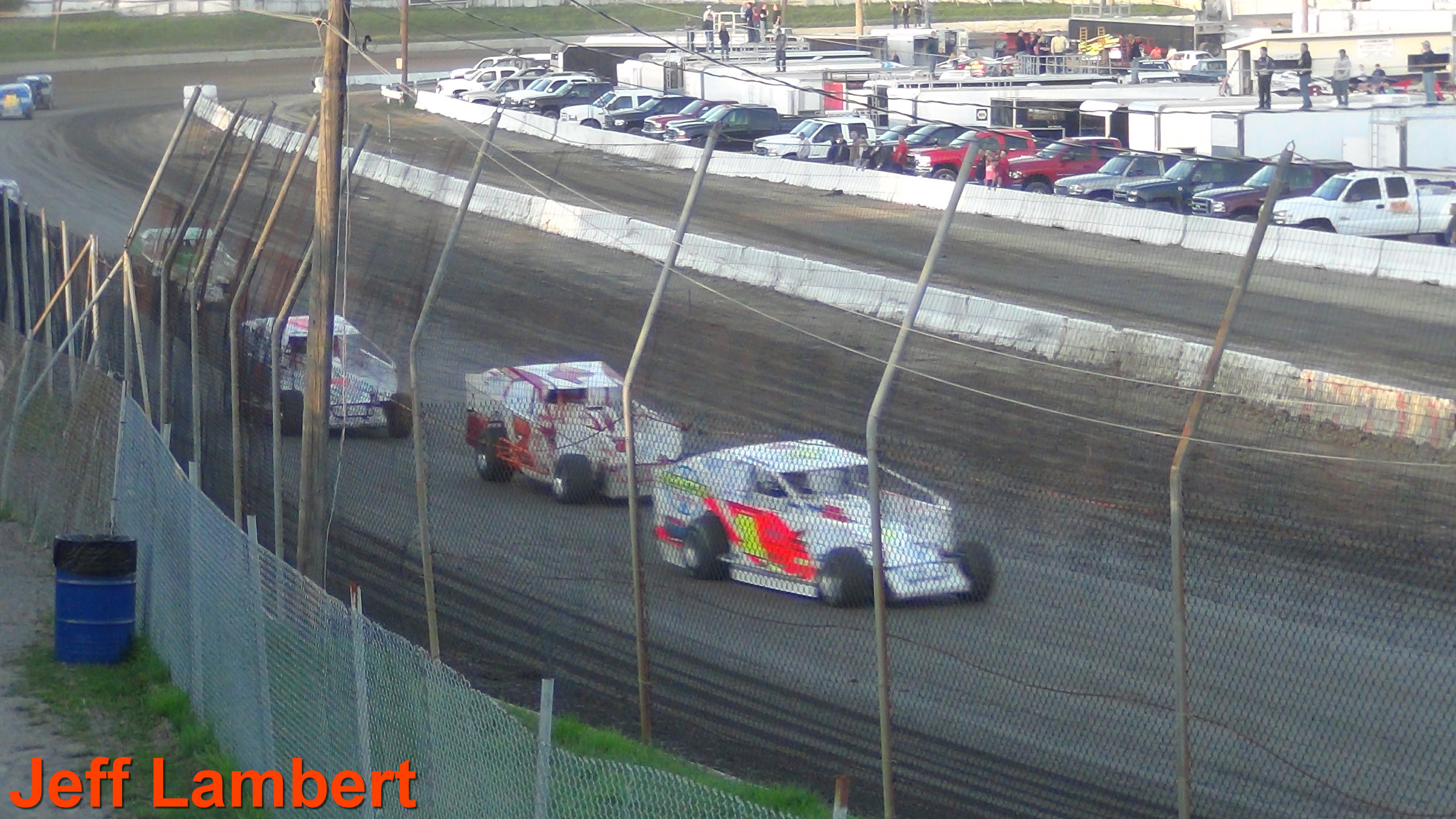

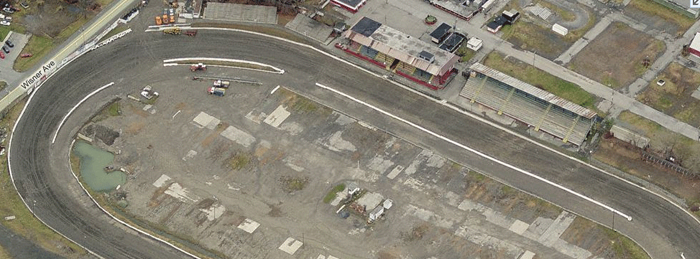

== Eastern States Weekend ==
The track also hosts the annual Eastern States Weekend, where dirt Modified, 358- Modified, and Sportsman drivers race their cars in 200 (modified), 150 (358s), and 50 lap races. The weekend usually falls in mid-October. This is the end of the racing season for most regulars at the track.

The Eastern States 200 Modified race is the oldest consecutively-run championship event for dirt track Modified stock cars in the United States.

The first race was run on October 28, 1962 and was won by Frankie Schneider of Lambertville, New Jersey.

In 1968 the annual 100-lap event was increased to 200 laps. The all-time track champion at Orange County Fair Speedway, Brett Hearn has won the Eastern States 200 a record 12 times since 1979.

=== Eastern States 200 Winners ===
Year	Driver	Year	Driver	Year	Driver
1962	Frankie Schneider	1987	Doug Hoffman	2012	Brett Hearn
1963	Frankie Schneider	1988	Rich Eurich	2013	Brett Hearn
1964	Rags Carter	1989	Frank Cozze	2014	Brett Hearn
1965	Ron Lux	1990	Frank Cozze	2015	Tommy Meier
1966	Will Cagle	1991	Jimmy Horton	2016	Stewart Friesen
1967	Frankie Schneider	1992	Danny Johnson	2017	Brett Hearn
1968	Will Cagle	1993	Danny Johnson	2018	Stewart Friesen
1969	Al Tasnady	1994	Bob McCreadie	2019	Stewart Friesen
1970	Will Cagle	1995	Jimmy Horton	2020	Mat Williamson
1971	Will Cagle	1996	Brett Hearn	2021	Matt Sheppard
1972	Buzzie Reutimann	1997	Danny Johnson	2022	Matt Sheppard
1973	Gerald Chamberlain	1998	Billy Decker	2023	Mat Williamson
1974	Bobby Bottcher	1999	Alan Johnson	2024	Stewart Friesen
1975	Wayne Reutimann	2000	Chuck McKee	2025	Alex Yankowski
1976	Gerald Chamberlain	2001	Danny Johnson	2026	Stewart Friesen
1977	Gary Balough	2002	Brett Hearn		
1978	Lou Lazzaro	2003	Bobby Varin		
1979	Brett Hearn	2004	Brett Hearn		
1980	Kenny Brightbill	2005	Brett Hearn		
1981	Brett Hearn	2006	Brett Hearn		
1982	Harry Behrent	2007	Jeff Heotzler		
1983	C. D. Coville	2008	Danny Johnson		
1984	Dave Lape	2009	Jerry Higbie		
1985	Jack Johnson	2010	Tim McCreadie		
1986	Brett Hearn	2011	Danny Johnson		

== Weekly events ==
Auto races used to be run every Saturday night from April through September and featured a variety of stock car divisions including Big Block Modifieds, Small Block Modifieds, Sportsman, Rookie Sportsman, Street Stocks, Thunder Trucks, CRSA Sprints, Slingshots and hosts an annual World of Outlaws Late Model race. Weekly races are not being held for 2024 race season.

In addition to weekly auto racing, the Orange County Fair Speedway has built a brand new motocross track on the grounds which made its inaugural debut in 2014 with six dates of racing.

== List of track champions ==
Stock car championships have been contested at the Orange County Fair Speedway consecutively since 1950 when the first Modified championship was won by Russ Dodd of Middletown.

Season	Modified	358 Modified	Sportsman	LM/Street Stock/Pure Stock	Pro-Stock - Expert	Pro-Stock - Novice	Pro-Stock - Rookie
1950	Russ Dodd						
1951	Harry North						
1952	Ray Brown						
1953	Ray Brown						
1954	Bud Marl						
1955	Charlie South						
1956	Bud Marl						
1957	Ray Brown						
1958	Sonny Strupp						
1959	Russ Delp						
1960	Sonny Strupp						
1961	Bob Malzahn						
1962	Ken Wismer Sr.	Jay Zanetti					
1963	Frankie Schneider	Billy Tanosh					
1964	Frankie Schneider / Billy Deskovick	Doc Norton					
1965	Bob Malzahn	Jerry Wilson					
1966	Will Cagle	Eddie Yonkers					
1967	Will Cagle	Stan Sherman					
1968	Will Cagle	Harold Wood		Jack Rassiga			
1969	Will Cagle	Bob Dean		George Kueck			
1970	Will Cagle	Rich Eurich		George Kueck			
1971	Carl Van Horn	Jerry Wilson		Brian DuBois			
1972	Buzzie Reutimann	Jerry Wilson		Loren Holland Sr.			
1973	Bobby Bottcher	Bobby Green		Bob DeLease			
1974	Buzzie Reutimann	Jim Horton Jr.					
1975	Wayne Reutimann	Harry Behrent					
1976	Jimmy Horton	Russ Meyer					
1977	Wayne Reutimann	Brett Hearn					
1978	Billy Osmun	Larry Brolsma					
1979	Brett Hearn	Ralph Heotzler		Eddie Woodruff			
1980	Brett Hearn	Jeff Heotzler		John Falcone			
1981	Rich Eurich	Ralph Heotzler		Mike Barlow			
1982	Rich Eurich	Steve Bottcher		Mike Barlow			
1983	Brett Hearn	Jeff Scaccio			Tom Cox	Terry Zuidema	Bobby Knipe
1984	Brett Hearn	Robbie Green			Tom Cannizzaro	Bobby Knipe	Vinnie Yannone
1985	Carl Collis	Gary LaBagh			Bobby Knipe	Emerson Cargain Sr.	Ken Tompkins
1986	Brett Hearn	Jeff Heotzler			Cris Grispin	John Finley	Tommy Meier
1987	Brett Hearn	Brett Hearn			Bobby Knipe	Ken Tompkins	John Majka
1988	Rich Eurich	Chuck LoPresti	Steve Dodd			Rob Medynski / Bobby Knipe	Craig Lynch
1989	Brett Hearn	Brett Hearn	Eddie Redner			Tommy Kuck	Scott Kehr
1990	Brett Hearn	Brett Hearn	Ken Boniface			Tommy Meier	Steve Galgano
1991	Brett Hearn	Brett Hearn	Tommy Meier			Steve Durand	Ken Pettit
1992	Brett Hearn	Brett Hearn	Steve Birchwale			Scott Kehr	Jim Cancel
1993	Brett Hearn	Danny Johnson	Dave Werber			Tim Green	Mark Hufcut
1994	Brett Hearn	Howie Finch	Tim Hindley			Scott Kehr	Tim Dembek
1995	Brett Hearn	Jimmy Hauser	Stan Jablonka			Barry Filipowski	Andy Dembek
1996	Jimmy Horton	Bob Hayes Jr.	Tim Hindley			Tom Cannizzaro	John Bryson
1997	Jeff Heotzler	Danny Johnson	Jimmy Johnson			Tom Cannizzaro	Mike Pomarico
1998	Chuck McKee	Andy Bachetti	Tony Paes Jr.	Brian Houghtaling		Cliff Tinnely	Willie Auchmoody
1999	Brett Hearn	Brett Hearn	Chris Shultz	Al D'Antonio		Cliff Tinnely	Rob Lowe
2000	Chuck McKee	Andy Bachetti	Chris Shultz	Ron Irvin		Tom Kuck	Jamie McGannon
2001	Chuck McKee	Andy Bachetti	Mark Hufcut	Al D'Antonio	Andy Dembek		Pete Goydich
2002	Chuck McKee	Tim Hindley	Stan Jablonka	Ron Irvan	Tom Dembek		Bob Waters Jr.
2003	Jeff Heotzler	Tommy Meier	Joe Dunay	Al D'Antonio	John Bryson		Marty Pender
2004	Tommy Meier	Jerry Higbie	Rick Mill	Greg Kurtzman	Jamie McGannon		Ron Carlson
2005	Jeff Heotzler	Jerry Higbie	Rick Mill	Al D'Antonio / Ray Tarantino	Sean Corr		Don Williams
2006	Brett Hearn	Brett Hearn	Joe Morel	Julius Pepin / Marty Van Neiuwland	Bill Pacual		
2007	Jeff Heotzler	David Van Horn	Rich Coons	Emerson Cargain Sr. / John Hechinger	Bob Waters Jr.		
2008	David Van Horn	Jerry Higbie	Mike Ruggiero	Tim McCarthy / Joel Murns	Mike Dutka		
2009	Chuck McKee / Jerry Higbie	Chuck McKee	Mike Ruggiero	Emerson Cargain Sr. / Matt Burke	Bill Pascual		
2010	Jerry Higbie		Brian Krummel	Emerson Cargain Sr.	Don Carlson	Jason Harayda	
2011	Tommy Meier		Gary Edwards Jr.	Charlie Donald	Mike Dutka		
2012	Jerry Higbie		Gary Edwards Jr.	Charlie Donald	Mike Dutka		
2013	Tim Hindley	Danny Creeden	Brian Krummel	Stephen Kammer	Jason Harayda		
2014	Tim Hindley	Chuck McKee	LJ Lombardo	Mike Vigiletti			
2015	Jerry Higbie	Gary Edwards Jr.	Randy Sweetman	Jim Maher			
2016	Tommy Meier	Tommy Meier	Tyler Boniface	Mike Vigiletti			
2017	Jimmy Horton	Anthony Perrego	Jessie Leiby	Mike Vigiletti			
2018	Anthony Perrego	Brian Krummel	Greg Sleight	Jim Maher			
2019	Brett Hearn	Anthony Perrego	Grant Hilfiger	Bobby Sleight Jr.			
2020	Matt Sheppard	Anthony Perrego	Tanner Vandoren	Bobby Sleight Jr.			
2021	Anthony Perrego	Anthony Perrego	Joe Bonetti	Mike Vigiletti			
2022	Matt Sheppard	Anthony Perrego	Cody Higbie	Bobby Sleight Jr.			
