= Andy Bachetti =

American dirt track race car driver

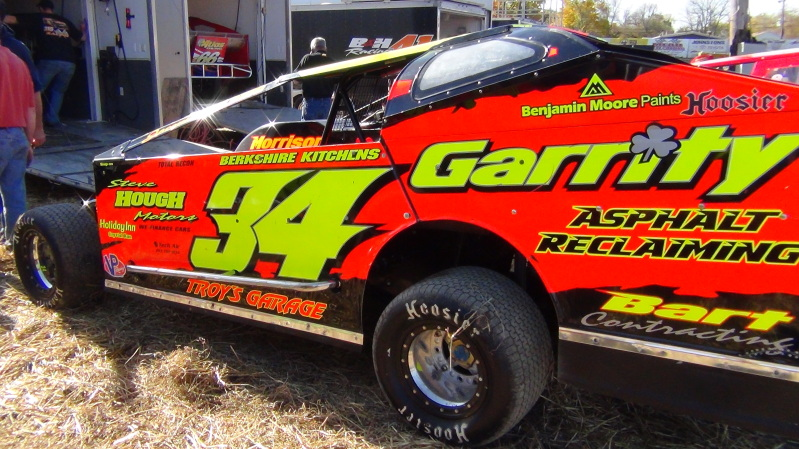
- Bachetti in 2012 at OCFS
- Nationality: American
- Born: December 13, 1975 (age 50) Sheffield, Massachusetts, U.S.

Modified racing career
- Debut season: 1994
- Current team: Bachetti's Auto Sales/Garrity Asphalt Reclaiming
- Car number: 4,17,21,34,40,57
- Former teams: Steve Hough
- Starts: 1702
- Championships: 29
- Wins: 257

Previous series
- 1993 1985-1992: Mini sprint Kart racing

Championship titles
- 2016 American Racer Cup; 2014, 2016, 2017 Short Track Super Series (So.); 2009 Mr. Dirt (Eastern Region)
- Statistics up to date as of November 1, 2026.

Andy Bachetti (born December 13, 1975), also known as "the Wild Child", is a dirt track race car driver from the Northeastern United States.

== Vehicles ==
Bachetti currently drives the number 4 Bachetti's Auto Sales/Garrity Asphalt Reclaiming big block modified at Lebanon Valley Speedway. He also races in the number 4 Garrity Asphalt Reclaiming 358 small block car at Lebanon Valley Speedway.

== Career ==
=== Early childhood ===
Bachetti began his racing career at the young age of ten when he began racing Go-Karts. He moved onto the mini sprint car racing division using the number 57 Bachetti's Auto Sales car. Orange County Fair Speedway became known as Bachetti's home track in the 1990s, where he won the 358 points championship multiple times.

Bachetti then moved to Lebanon Valley Speedway in New York which became, and has remained, his new home track. he set the lap record at Lebanon Valley in 2004 with a time of 19.645 seconds, a record that still holds true today.

=== Major Races ===
Bachetti races a limited schedule of the Super DIRTcar Series, in which he won a major victory at the Utica-Rome competition. This includes his annual stop at Super Dirt Week at the New York State Fairgrounds in Syracuse, New York.

Bachetti was involved in the Octoberfest Racing Classic in 2000 at Flamboro, placing third, and won first place at the Albany-Saratoga Speedway. Then in 2001, he placed second behind Tony Stewart in the I Love New York 358 Championship. Bachetti won another second-place victory in the Carquest 200 in 2002, behind Brett Hearn, a multiple Super DIRTcar Series winner. He won a first-place victory in the 16th Annual Octoberfest 350 for the 100-lap small block modified division in 2003, along with the Race of Kings at the Lebanon Valley Speedway. Another victory was awarded to Bachetti in 2003 at the Accord Speedway, where he won first place in the Interstate 86 Equipment 30-lap DIRT 358 modified feature. The Coors National 200 in 2004 ended with Bachetti winning first place and $10,000, with the victory marking his first win in a 200-lap race. In 2006, Andy won the points title in both the 358 and big block divisions at Lebanon Valley. In 2008, he won the points championship at the Accord Speedway, snapping a streak of championships by Rich Ricci Jr. and Mike Ricci. Then, in 2009, he once again won the 358 and big block divisions at Lebanon Valley Speedway. He also became the first person at Lebanon Valley to win two races on the same night, four years in a row.

On April 6, 2014, Bachetti won the inaugural 'Hard Clay Open' 50-lap Modified race at the Orange County Fair Speedway in Middletown, New York.

== Personal life ==
Bachetti is married to Natalie Johnson Bachetti and lives in Sheffield, Massachusetts. They have two children; Blake, age 9 and Delaina, age 4. His occupation is full-time race car driver and enjoys hunting, fishing and snowmobiling
