= Ardex (car manufacturer) =

Defunct French automobile manufacturer

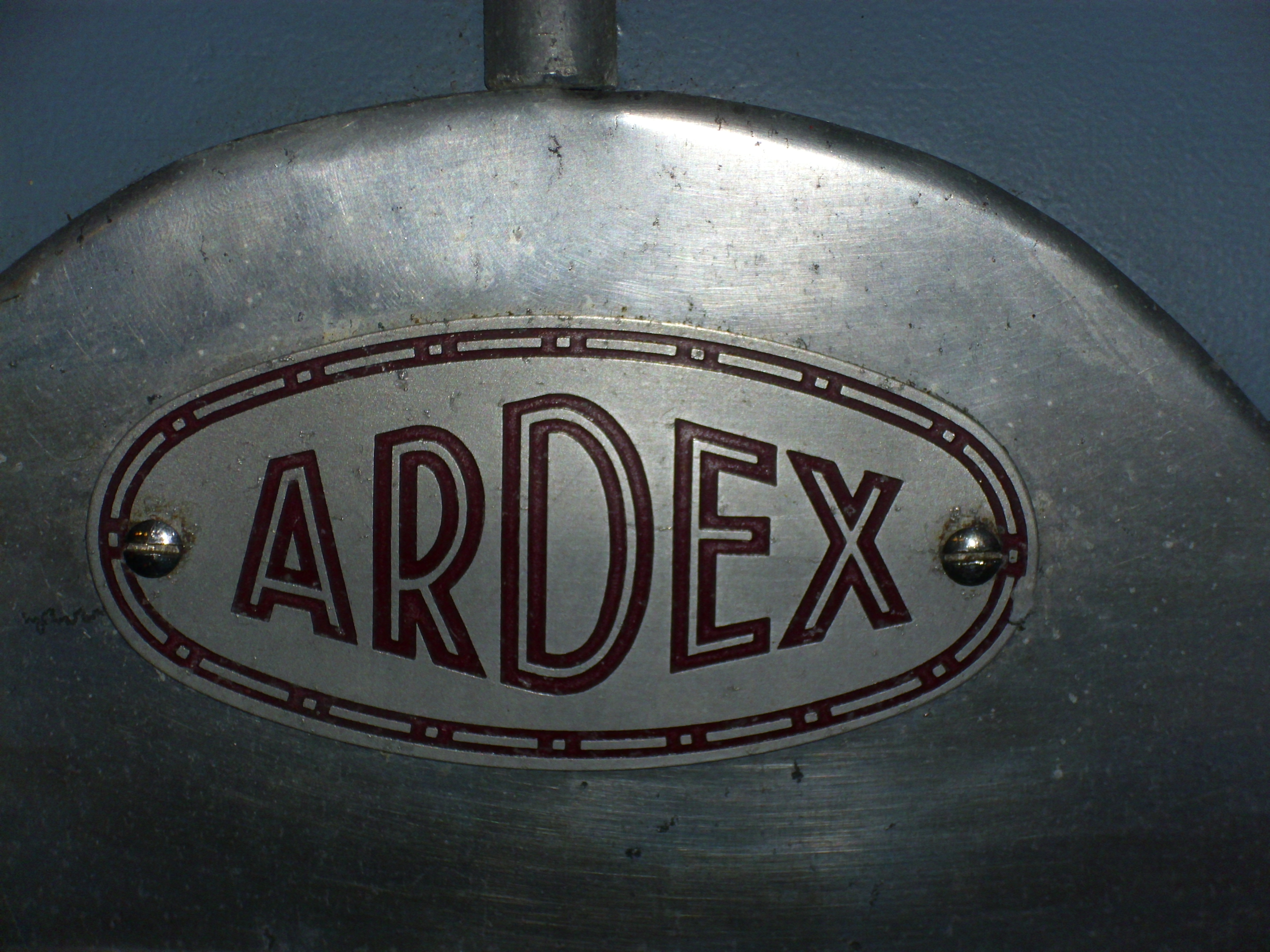

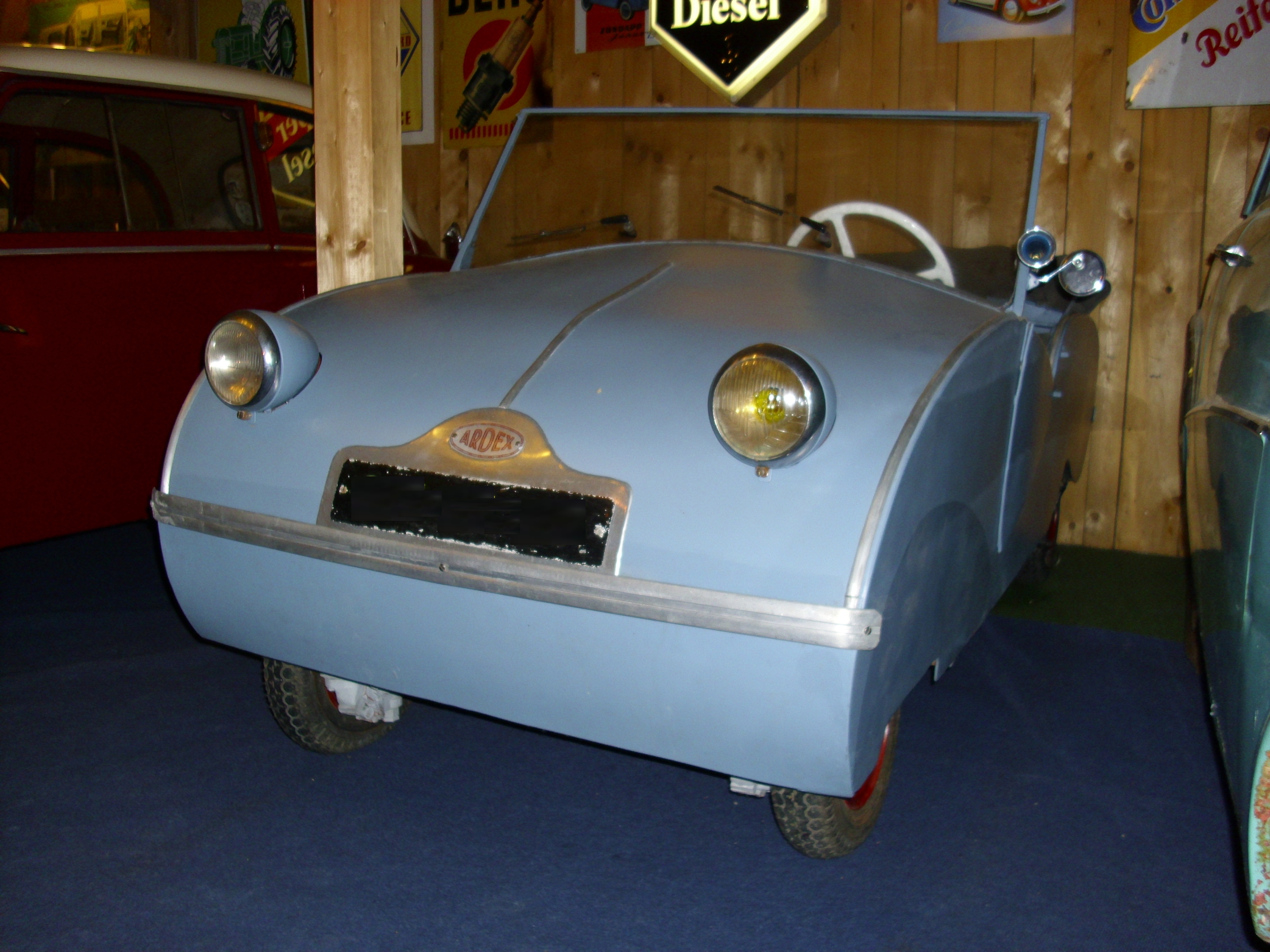
Ardex from 1952–1955

Ardex was a small French automobile manufacturer controlled by Marcel Tamine and based in Nanterre.

In 1934, Ardex produced its first cyclecar, which followed the form of the Morgan three-wheeler and was powered by a V2 500 cc engine. A four-wheel car followed in 1937 which was at the time the cheapest car on the French market, priced at 5,500 francs: 10,900 francs were needed to buy a Simca 5.

In September 1939 France declared war on Germany and in June 1940 the German Army rapidly invaded and occupied Northern France. The war years were characterised by a desperate shortage of raw materials for civilian industry and of petrol. Their experience of producing very small lightweight cyclecars now encouraged Ardex to develop several little cars powered initially by electric batteries and later by pedal power during 1942 and 1943. The first significant order came from the Fulmen Company, then a leading French producer of electrical goods and equipment. The early wartime cyclecars came on four wheels, but the number of the wheels was quickly reduced to three since during 1942 tyres became increasingly hard to find and, where found, hard to afford. In October 1942 the occupying power banned the construction of electric cars, following which Ardex were restricted to pedal powered cyclecars until after the war.

In 1953, Ardex introduced a four-seater microcar. The engine was a Société Anonyme BriBan (S.A.B.B) single cylinder two stroke unit of 100 or 125 cc.

Production ended in 1955.

The Ardex name was then acquired by Max Sardou, a French engineer. He went on to create the Ardex S80, which was entered in the 1981 24 Hours of Le Mans as a Group 6 Prototype but failed to qualify. It was powered by the BMW M88 3.5L from the BMW M1 and paired to a Hewland five speed manual transmission.

== See also ==
- Cyclecar
- Microcar
