= Buzzie Reutimann =

American racing driver

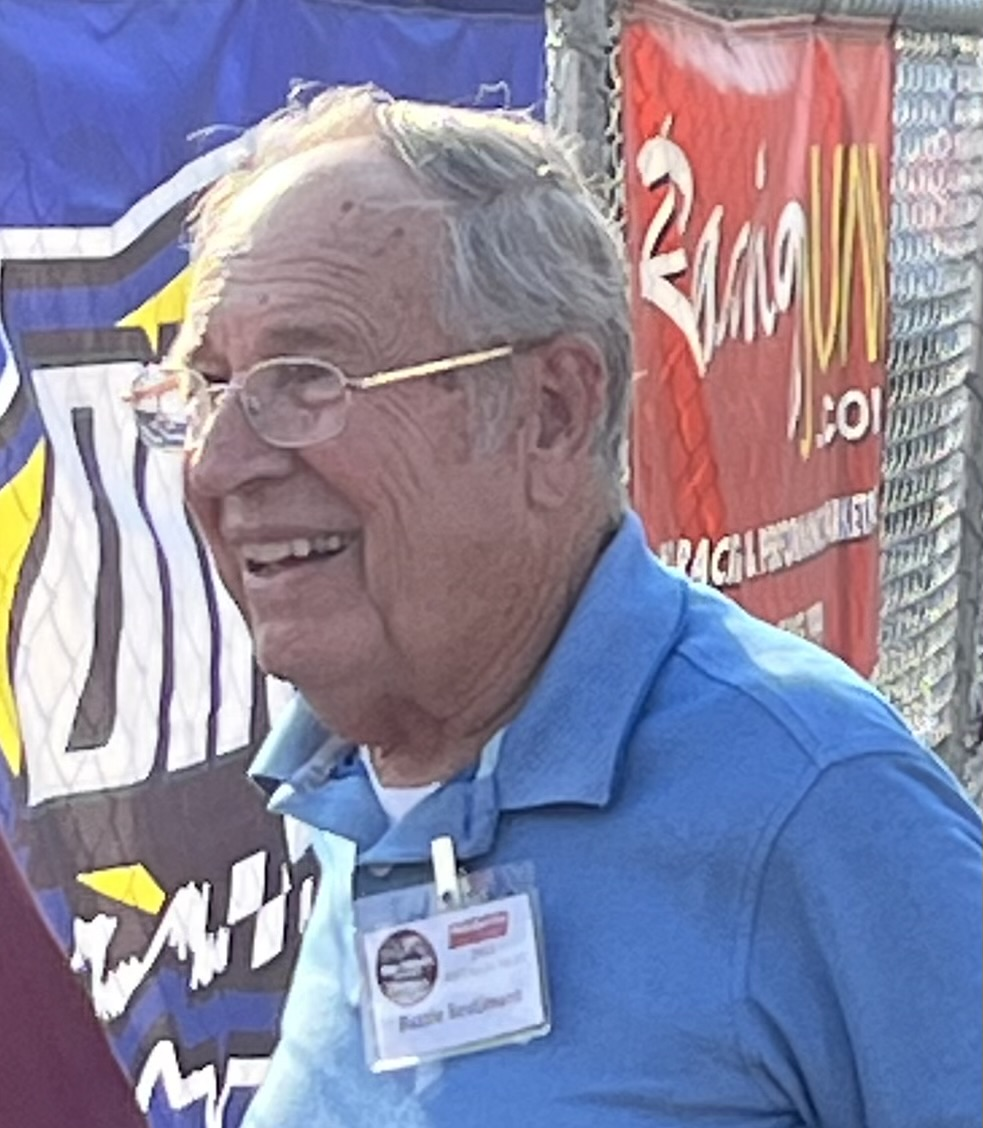
- Reutimann in 2023
- Born: Emil Lloyd Reutimann; May 7, 1941 (age 85) Zephyrhills, Florida, U.S.

Motorsports career
- Debut season: 1957
- Car number: 00
- Championships: 5

Championship titles
- 1973 All Star Stock Car Racing League Champion

NASCAR Cup Series career
- 1 race run over 1 year
- Best finish: 119th (1963)
- First race: 1963 Race No. 2 (Golden Gate Speedway)
Wins	Top tens	Poles
0	1	0

Emil Lloyd "Buzzie" Reutimann (born May 7, 1941) is a former NASCAR driver from Zephyrhills, Florida. He is the father of former driver David Reutimann. Reutimann was inducted into the Northeast Dirt Modified Hall of Fame in 1997 and the Eastern Motorsport Press Association Hall of Fame in 2006.

== Racing career ==
Reutimann began working on race cars at age 13 despite his mother's protests. Primarily a short track racer, he made one NASCAR start on November 11, 1962, in Tampa, Florida, at Golden Gate Speedway. He started 18th and finished tenth in the event, which was considered part of the 1963 season. He was given the nickname "Buzzie" at birth after several nurses noticed he made buzzing sounds as an infant. He drove the number No. 00, and so did his son David in the Cup Series.

While competing on dirt tracks in the Northeast, Reutimann was a summer resident on a farm in the Asbury section of Franklin Township, Warren County, New Jersey.

In 1972, Reutimann won the dirt modified track championship at the Orange County Fair Speedway in Middletown, New York. That same year he captured the win at the prestigious Eastern States 200. Reutimann would also win the first running of the event now known as Super Dirt Week in 1972 at the Syracuse Fairgrounds. He would win again in 1973.

Reutimann has continued to race and win into his eighties. He competes weekly at East Bay Raceway Park in Tampa, Florida.

== Motorsports career results ==
=== NASCAR ===
(key) (Bold – Pole position awarded by qualifying time. Italics – Pole position earned by points standings or practice time. * – Most laps led.)

==== Grand National Series ====
NASCAR Grand National Series results
Year	Team	No.	Make	1	2	3	4	5	6	7	8	9	10	11	12	13	14	15	16	17	18	19	20	21	22	23	24	25	26	27	28	29	30	31	32	33	34	35	36	37	38	39	40	41	42	43	44	45	46	47	48	49	50	51	52	53	54	55	NGNC	Pts	Ref
1963	-	22A	Chevy	BIR	GGS; 10	THS	RSD	DAY	DAY	DAY	PIF	AWS	HBO	ATL	HCY	BRI	AUG	RCH	GPS	SBO	BGS	MAR	NWS	CLB	THS	DAR	ODS	RCH	CLT	BIR	ATL	DAY	MBS	SVH	DTS	BGS	ASH	OBS	BRR	BRI	GPS	NSV	CLB	AWS	PIF	BGS	ONA	DAR	HCY	RCH	MAR	DTS	NWS	THS	CLT	SBO	HBO	RSD	119th	256	
