= Harmony Speedway =

Racing venue in Warren County, New Jersey, US

Coordinates: 40.7688°N 75.1707°W

Harmony Speedway was a racing venue in Warren County, New Jersey, which opened on June 7, 1963 and closed in 1975.
