= Stratagraph =

Stratagraph is an oil field service company headquartered in Lafayette, Louisiana. The primary focus of the business is providing mud logging, geosteering and well site geology services to petroleum exploration and production companies.

The company was started in 1961 by Billy Hagan. Over time, it grew into one of the largest mud logging companies in the world.

Due to Hagan's intense interest in automobile racing, Stratagraph has fielded several race teams of various types through the years, most notably in the NASCAR Winston Cup Series and in IMSA sports car events and endurance racing. Teams owned by Hagan, and at least partly sponsored by Stratagraph, have featured drivers Terry Labonte, Gene Felton, Cale Yarborough, Dick Brooks, Sterling Marlin and John Andretti.

In 1984, the Piedmont Airlines Chevrolet Monte Carlo, driven by Terry Labonte, won the NASCAR Winston Cup.
