= 1969 World 600 =

Auto race held at Charlotte Motor Speedway in 1969

Race details
- Race 21 of 54 in the 1969 NASCAR Grand National Series season
- Layout of Charlotte Motor Speedway
- Date: May 25, 1969
- Official name: World 600
- Location: Charlotte Motor Speedway, Concord, North Carolina
- Course: Permanent racing facility
- Course length: 1.500 miles (2.414 km)
- Distance: 334 laps, 501 mi (804 km)
- Weather: Temperatures of 84 °F (29 °C); wind speeds of 6 miles per hour (9.7 km/h)
- Average speed: 134.361 miles per hour (216.233 km/h)
- Attendance: 75,000

Pole position
Driver	Donnie Allison	Banjo Matthews

Most laps led
Driver	LeeRoy Yarbrough	Junior Johnson
- Laps: 274

Winner
No. 98	LeeRoy Yarbrough	Junior Johnson

Television in the United States
- Network: untelevised
- Announcers: none

The 1969 World 600, the 10th running of the event, was a NASCAR Grand National Series event that took place on May 25, 1969, at Charlotte Motor Speedway in Concord, North Carolina.

== Background ==
The race was held at Charlotte Motor Speedway, a 1.5-mile (2.4 km) asphalt quad-oval in Concord, North Carolina. The track, which opened in 1960, was built by Bruton Smith and Curtis Turner.

== Qualifying ==
Grid	No.	Driver	Manufacturer	Owner
1	27	Donnie Allison	'69 Ford	Banjo Matthews
2	98	LeeRoy Yarbrough	'69 Mercury	Junior Johnson
3	17	David Pearson	'69 Ford	Holman-Moody Racing
4	21	Cale Yarborough	'69 Mercury	Wood Brothers
5	43	Richard Petty	'69 Ford	Petty Enterprises
6	22	Bobby Allison	'69 Dodge	Mario Rossi
7	6	Buddy Baker	'69 Dodge	Cotton Owens
8	30	Dave Marcis	'69 Dodge	Milt Lunda
9	99	Paul Goldsmith	'69 Dodge	Ray Nichels
10	71	Bobby Isaac	'69 Dodge	Nord Krauskopf
11	48	James Hylton	'69 Dodge	James Hylton
12	3	Neil Castles	'69 Dodge	Ray Fox
13	14	Sam McQuagg	'69 Plymouth	Bill Ellis
14	39	Friday Hassler	'67 Chevrolet	Friday Hassler
15	67	Buddy Arrington	'69 Dodge	Buddy Arrington
16	64	Elmo Langley	'68 Ford	Elmo Langley
17	32	Dick Brooks	'69 Plymouth	Dick Brooks
18	10	Bill Champion	'68 Ford	Bill Champion
19	08	E.J. Trivette	'69 Chevrolet	E.C. Reid
20	61	Hoss Ellington	'67 Mercury	Hoss Ellington

== Race report ==
Four hundred laps were raced on the paved oval track spanning 1.5 miles (2.4 km). After nearly four hours and thirty minutes of racing, LeeRoy Yarbrough defeated Donnie Allison by two laps in front of 75000 spectators. The 16-lap difference between 2nd-place finisher Donnie Allison and 3rd-place finisher James Hylton was another notable feature of this event. Five cautions would be waved for 45 laps along with 13 lead changes among eight different drivers. LeeRoy Yarbrough would lead the race from lap 162 through lap 400; putting on a very strong performance to win the race.

There were 44 drivers in the race; racing for a total of $132,100 ($1,159,771 when considering inflation). Ed Negre would get the last-place finish in Don Tarr's 1967 Chevrolet due to a transmission problem on the second lap. Don Tarr scored his best career finish of 6th place. Allison would gain the pole position with a speed of 159.296 miles per hour (256.362 km/h) while the average race speed was 134.631 miles per hour (216.668 km/h).

Pearson's car rode the guardrail on a lap 13 crash. His car came back on the inside of the racetrack but while riding the guardrail Pearson hit a flag pole. Dave Marcis would have a long career ahead of him after leading the laps in this race. However, this would be the final race for Gerald Chamberlain and Larry Hess.

Notable crew chiefs: Cotton Owens, Dick Hutcherson, Glen Wood, Banjo Matthews, Jim Vandiver, Dale Inman and Harry Hyde.

=== Timeline ===
Section reference:

- Start of race: Cale Yarborough had the pole position to begin the event.
- Lap 2: Ed Negre's vehicle developed transmission problems.
- Lap 4: LeeRoy Yarbrough took over the lead from Cale Yarborough; John Keeney had a terminal crash.
- Lap 13: David Pearson had a terminal crash.
- Lap 15: The radiator on Bobby Allison's vehicle developed serious issues.
- Lap 30: Paul Goldsmith took over the lead from LeeRoy Yarborough.
- Lap 34: The sway bar on Henley Gray's video became dangerously loose.
- Lap 38: James Hylton took over the lead from Paul Goldsmith.
- Lap 40: Paul Goldsmith took over the lead from James Hylton.
- Lap 42: Bobby Isaac took over the lead from Paul Goldsmith.
- Lap 48: Dave Marcis took over the lead from Bobby Isaac; the carburetor on Richard Brickhouse's vehicle caught on fire.
- Lap 54: Richard Petty took over the lead from Dave Marcis.
- Lap 57: The wiring on Gerald Chamberlain's vehicle failed.
- Lap 81: Dub Simpson managed to lose the rear end of his vehicle.
- Lap 104: LeeRoy Yarbrough took over the lead from Richard Petty.
- Lap 106: Richard Petty took over the lead from LeeRoy Yarbrough.
- Lap 108: Wendell Scott fell out with engine failure.
- Lap 110: Roy Mayne fell out with engine failure.
- Lap 122: Larry Hess fell out with engine failure.
- Lap 135: Bill Champion fell out with engine failure.
- Lap 139: Frank Warren overheated his vehicle.
- Lap 150: John Sears fell out with engine failure.
- Lap 151: LeeRoy Yarbrough took the lead from Richard Petty.
- Lap 153: Neil Castles had a terminal crash.
- Lap 158: Bobby Isaac took over the lead from LeeRoy Yarbrough.
- Lap 162: LeeRoy Yarbrough took over the lead from Bobby Isaac.
- Lap 272: Dave Marcis fell out with engine failure.
- Lap 303: Sam McQuagg fell out with engine failure.
- Lap 307: An incident involving a vehicle's hub forced Cale Yarborough out of the race.
- Lap 308: Buddy Arrington fell out with engine failure.
- Lap 336: Richard Petty fell out with engine failure.
- Lap 347: Buddy Baker fell out with engine failure.
- Lap 367: Friday Hassler fell out with engine failure.
- Lap 374: Bobby Isaac fell out with engine failure.
- Finish: LeeRoy Yarbrough was the winner of the event.

== Finishing order ==
Section reference:

1. LeeRoy Yarbrough
2. Donnie Allison
3. James Hylton
4. G.C. Spencer
5. Bobby Isaac
6. Don Tarr
7. Hoss Ellington
8. Jabe Thomas
9. Friday Hassler
10. Elmo Langley
11. Sonny Hutchins
12. Buddy Young
13. E.J. Trivette
14. Roy Tyner
15. J.D. McDuffie
16. Buddy Baker
17. Ed Hessert
18. Bill Seifert
19. Richard Petty
20. Ben Arnold
21. Cecil Gordon
22. Buddy Arrington
23. Cale Yarborough
24. Earl Brooks
25. Sam McQuagg
26. Dave Marcis
27. Paul Goldsmith
28. Neil Castles
29. John Sears
30. Frank Warren
31. Bill Champion
32. Larry Hess
33. Dick Brooks
34. Roy Mayne
35. Wendell Scott
36. Dub Simpson
37. Dick Johnson
38. Gerald Chamberlain
39. Richard Brickhouse
40. Henley Gray
41. Bobby Allison
42. David Pearson
43. John Kenney
44. Ed Negre

Preceded by 1969 Tidewater 375	NASCAR Grand National Series season 1969	Succeeded by 1969 Macon 300

Preceded by 1968	World 600 races 1969	Succeeded by 1970
