= Jeff Strunk =

American Dirt Modified racing driver (born 1968)

- Born: August 7, 1968 (age 58) Bechtelsville, Pennsylvania, U.S.

Modified racing career
- Debut season: 1988
- Car number: 4*, 6, w9, 41, 88, 93, 126, 357
- Championships: 22
- Wins: 227

Previous series
- 1977-1987 Wins: Kart racing 200+

Championship titles
- 2008, 2009, 2011, 2018 NASCAR Pennsylvania State Champion; 2005 Race of Champions Dirt Modified Tour (South); 2004 Mr. Dirt 358 (Southeast Region)
- Statistics up to date as of October 25, 2026.

Jeff Strunk (August 7, 1968) is an American Dirt Modified racing driver, credited with over 220 career wins at tracks in the Mid-Atlantic (United States).

== Racing career ==
Strunk grew up a half mile from the Grandview Speedway in Bechtelsville, Pennsylvania, and began racing go-karts at the age of nine. After more than 200 national victories, he made the jump to modifieds in 1988.

Strunk won the first of four NASCAR Pennsylvania state championships in 2008. Along the way, he claimed track championships at the Pennsylvania venues of Big Diamond Speedway in Pottsville, Grandview, Penn National Speedway in Grantville, and Susquehanna Speedway in York.

Strunk also competed successfully at venues throughout the northeast, including Pennsylvania venues Bloomsburg Fair Raceway, Penn Can Speedway in Susquehanna, and Selinsgrove Speedway; Bridgeport Speedway and New Egypt Speedway in New Jersey; Five Mile Point Speedway in Kirkwood New York; and Georgetown Speedway, Delaware.
