= Craig Von Dohren =

- Born: August 13, 1963 (age 63) Oley, Pennsylvania, U.S.

Modified racing career
- Debut season: 1980 Big Diamond Speedway, PA
- Car number: 1c,30,114,126
- Championships: 17
- Wins: 366+

Previous series
- Kart racing

Championship titles
- 2013, 2015, 2016, 2017, 2020, 2021 NASCAR PA State Champion and 2022 NASCAR Northeast Regional Champion
- Statistics up to date as of September 1, 2024.

Craig Von Dohren (born August 13, 1963) is an American Dirt Modified racing driver. A NASCAR Northeast Regional champion, Von Dohren has over 350 career wins, at 13 tracks in five states.

== Racing career ==
Craig Von Dohren grew up racing go-karts against fellow Oley, Pennsylvania, resident Duane Howard before transitioning to modifieds in his teens. His first victory came in 1980 at Big Diamond Raceway in Pottsville, Pennsylvania, two weeks before his 17th birthday. He has since gone on to win four 358 Modified titles at Big Diamond, as well as 13 track championships at Grandview Speedway in Bechtelsville, Pennsylvania, where he tops the all-time win list.

Von Dohren, who has focused his career on the Mid-Atlantic states, has also competed successfully at Georgetown Speedway, Delaware, Hagerstown Speedway, Maryland, and Penn National Speedway in Grantville, Pennsylvania. He was inducted into the Northeast Dirt Modified Hall of Fame in 2022.
