= Ryan Godown =

American racing driver (born 1975)

- Born: June 16, 1975 (age 51) Ringoes, New Jersey

Modified racing career
- Debut season: 1998
- Car number: 26, 260, 747
- Championships: 14
- Wins: 194

Previous series
- 1995-1997: Street Stock

Championship titles
- 2022 American Racer Cup Modified Champion
- Statistics up to date as of November 14, 2026.

Ryan Matthew Godown (born June 16, 1975) is an American professional dirt modified racing driver.

== Racing career ==
Raised in the Ringoes section of East Amwell Township, New Jersey, Godown graduated in 1994 from Hunterdon Central Regional High School. His passion for auto racing developed as a child sitting in the stands at Flemington Speedway, New Jersey. He campaigned in the Street Stock division, capturing his first feature event in 1996 at East Windsor Speedway, New Jersey. Two years later he claimed his first win in the track's Sportsman-modified division and tied for the division championship at Bridgeport Motorsports Park, New Jersey.

Godown captured the 2000 and 2001 division crowns at New Egypt Speedway, New Jersey, and the 2001 Super Dirt Week Sportsman-modified event at the Syracuse Mile, New York. The following year he moved up to the big-block modifieds, and has since captured 6 more track championships at New Egypt, along with two each at Bridgeport and Georgetown (Deleware) Speedway, and another at Big Diamond Speedway in Pottsville, Pennsylvania.

Godown has competed successfully at 20 different tracks, including Cherokee Speedway in Gaffney, South Carolina, and Grandview (Bechtelsville) and Port Royal Speedways in Pennsylvania.
