= 2018 World of Outlaws Craftsman Late Model Series =

Car racing competition

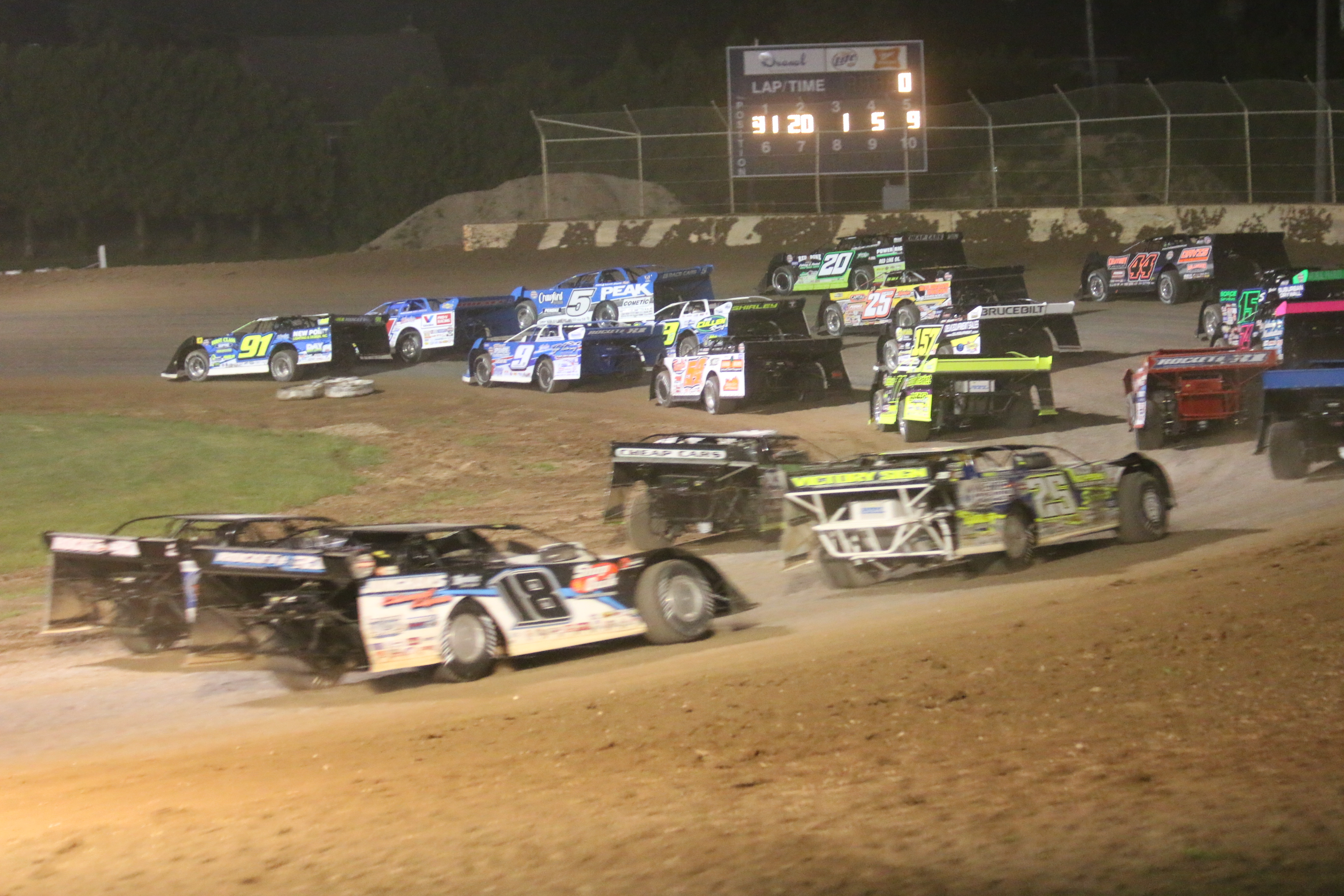
Plymouth Dirt Track in July 2018

The 2018 World of Outlaws Craftsman Late Model Series is the 17th season of dirt late model racing sanctioned by the World of Outlaws. It is also the 30th anniversary since the series was originally formed in 1988. The season began with the Winter Freeze at Screven Motor Speedway on February 9, and will end with the Textron Off Road World of Outlaws World Finals at The Dirt Track at Charlotte on November 3. Brandon Sheppard entered the season as the defending champion and Mike Marlar won the 2018 championship.

== Teams and drivers ==
=== Complete schedule ===
No.	Race driver	Team	Chassis
1	Brandon Sheppard	Mark Richards Racing	Rocket
1*	Chub Frank	Chub Frank Racing	Rocket
7	Rick Eckert	Paul Crow Racing	Rocket
9	Devin Moran	Tye Twarog Racing / DMR	Rocket
14	Morgan Bagley	McMillan Motorsports	Black Diamond
18c	Chase Junghans	Junghans Racing	Rocket
21jr	Billy Moyer Jr.	Moyer Motorsports	Longhorn
22	Chris Ferguson	Chris Ferguson Motorsports	Rocket
25	Shane Clanton	Shane Clanton Racing	Capital
31	Tyler Millwood	Millwood Motorsports	Barry Wright
44	Chris Madden	CMR	Barry Wright
54	David Breazeale	Fifty-Four Motorsports	
75	Colton Flinner	Colton Flinner Racing	Kryptonite
91	Tyler Erb	Erb Racing	Rocket
116	Brandon Overton	Randy Weaver Racing	Longhorn
157	Mike Marlar	Delk Equipment Racing	
b1	Brett Larson	Arnie Ranta Motorsports	Longhorn
c8	Timothy Culp	C Eight Motorsports	Rocket
CJ1	Rusty Schlenk	Rusty Schlenk Racing	CJ Rayburn

== Schedule ==
DIRTvision.com will broadcast all races with live radio coverage, along with select races with live video coverage.

No.	Date	Race title	Track	TV / Stream
≠	February 9	Winter Freeze	Screven Motor Speedway, Sylvania, Georgia	
≠	February 10	Winter Freeze	Screven Motor Speedway, Sylvania, Georgia	
1	February 14	DIRTcar Nationals	Volusia Speedway Park, Barberville, Florida	DIRTvision.com
2	February 15	DIRTcar Nationals	Volusia Speedway Park, Barberville, Florida	DIRTvision.com
3	February 16	DIRTcar Nationals	Volusia Speedway Park, Barberville, Florida	DIRTvision.com
4	February 17	DIRTcar Nationals	Volusia Speedway Park, Barberville, Florida	DIRTvision.com
≠	March 9	Tennessee Tipoff	Smoky Mountain Speedway, Maryville, Tennessee	
≠	March 10	Tennessee Tipoff	Smoky Mountain Speedway, Maryville, Tennessee	
≠	March 23	Illini 100 presented by Douglas Dodge	Farmer City Raceway, Farmer City, Illinois	
≠	March 24	Illini 100 presented by Douglas Dodge	Farmer City Raceway, Farmer City, Illinois	
≠	April 13	Illini 100 presented by Douglas Dodge	Farmer City Raceway, Farmer City, Illinois	
≠	April 14	Illini 100 presented by Douglas Dodge	Farmer City Raceway, Farmer City, Illinois	
5	April 20	Queen City Shootout	Whynot Motorsports Park, Meridian, Mississippi	
6	April 21	Queen City Shootout	Whynot Motorsports Park, Meridian, Mississippi	
7	April 27	Tennessee Tipoff	Smoky Mountain Speedway, Maryville, Tennessee	
8	April 28	Tennessee Tipoff	Smoky Mountain Speedway, Maryville, Tennessee	
9	May 3		Lavonia Speedway, Lavonia, Georgia	
10	May 4		Cherokee Speedway, Gaffney, South Carolina	
11	May 5	Billy Clanton Classic	Senoia Raceway, Senoia, Georgia	
≈	May 11	First In Flight 100	Fayetteville Motor Speedway, Fayetteville, North Carolina	
12	May 12	First In Flight 100	Fayetteville Motor Speedway, Fayetteville, North Carolina	
≠	May 18	Outlaw Invasion	Atomic Speedway, Waverly, Ohio	
≠	May 19	Outlaw Invasion	Atomic Speedway, Waverly, Ohio	
13	June 1		411 Motor Speedway, Seymour, Tennessee	
14	June 2		Volunteer Speedway, Bulls Gap, Tennessee	
15	June 14		Stateline Speedway, Jamestown, New York	
16	June 15		Ransomville Speedway, Ransomville, New York	
17	June 16		Wayne County Speedway, Orrville, Ohio	
18	June 21	Firecracker 100	Lernerville Speedway, Sarver, Pennsylvania	Dirt on DIRT
19	June 22	Firecracker 100	Lernerville Speedway, Sarver, Pennsylvania	Dirt on DIRT
20	June 23	Firecracker 100	Lernerville Speedway, Sarver, Pennsylvania	Dirt on DIRT
21	June 29	Vs. DIRTcar Nationals	Terre Haute Action Track, Terre Haute, Indiana	
22	June 30	Vs. DIRTcar Nationals	Federated Auto Parts Raceway at I-55, Pevely, Missouri	
23	July 6		Dubuque Speedway, Dubuque, Iowa	
24	July 7	Gopher 50	Deer Creek Speedway, Spring Valley, Minnesota	
25	July 10		Black Hills Speedway, Rapid City, South Dakota	
26	July 12	TBA	TBA	
27	July 13		River Cities Speedway, Grand Forks, North Dakota	
28	July 14		Ogilvile Raceway, Ogilvile, Minnesota	
29	July 24		Davenport Speedway, Davenport, Iowa	
≈	July 27	Prairie Dirt Classic	Fairbury American Legion Speedway, Fairbury, Illinois	
30	July 28	Prairie Dirt Classic	Fairbury American Legion Speedway, Fairbury, Illinois	
31	July 30		Plymouth Dirt Track, Plymouth, Wisconsin	
32	July 31	Sundrop Shootout	Shawano Speedway, Shawano, Wisconsin	
33	August 2	USA Nationals	Cedar Lake Speedway, New Richmond, Wisconsin	Dirt on DIRT
≈	August 3	USA Nationals	Cedar Lake Speedway, New Richmond, Wisconsin	Dirt on DIRT
34	August 4	USA Nationals	Cedar Lake Speedway, New Richmond, Wisconsin	Dirt on DIRT
35	August 6		Farley Speedway, Farley, Iowa	
36	August 16	Fulton Bank 40	Georgetown Speedway, Georgetown, Delaware	
37	August 17		Williams Grove Speedway, Mechanicsburg, Pennsylvania	
38	August 18		Port Royal Speedway, Port Royal, Pennsylvania	
39	August 19		Eriez Speedway, Eriez, Pennsylvania	
40	September 21		Outlaw Speedway, Dundee, New York	
41	September 22	Late Model National Open	Selinsgrove Speedway, Selinsgrove, Pennsylvania	
42	September 28	Outlaw Invasion	Atomic Speedway, Waverly, Ohio	
43	September 29	Outlaw Invasion	Atomic Speedway, Waverly, Ohio	
≈	October 12	Chi-Town Showdown	The Dirt Oval at Route 66, Joliet, Illinois	
44	October 13	Chi-Town Showdown	The Dirt Oval at Route 66, Joliet, Illinois	
≈	November 1	Textron Off Road World of Outlaws World Finals	The Dirt Track at Charlotte Motor Speedway, Concord, North Carolina	DIRTvision.com Dirt on DIRT
45	November 2	Textron Off Road World of Outlaws World Finals	The Dirt Track at Charlotte Motor Speedway, Concord, North Carolina	DIRTvision.com Dirt on DIRT
46	November 3	Textron Off Road World of Outlaws World Finals	The Dirt Track at Charlotte Motor Speedway, Concord, North Carolina	DIRTvision.com Dirt on DIRT

- ≠ - the race was postponed or canceled
- ≈ - will state if the race is not for championship points

=== Schedule notes and changes ===
- The Winter Freeze races at Screven Motor Speedway on February 9–10 were canceled due to weather conditions.
- The Tennessee Tipoff races at Smoky Mountain Speedway on March 9–10 was postponed due to weather conditions. The 2 races were rescheduled on April 27 & 28.
- The Illini 100 at Farmer City Raceway (March 23–24, later postponed to April 13–14) was canceled due to weather conditions.
- The Outlaw Invasion at Atomic Speedway (May 18–19) was postponed to September 28–29 due to weather.

== Results and standings ==
=== Races ===
No.	Race / Track	Winning driver	Winning team	Hard Charger Award winner	Last Chance Showdown winner	Fastest Qualifier
1	DIRTcar Nationals (Night #9)	Tim McCreadie	Coffey-McCreadie Enterprises	Brandon Overton ( - )	Brandon Sheppard	Tim McCreadie A
1	DIRTcar Nationals (Night #9)	Tim McCreadie	Coffey-McCreadie Enterprises	Brandon Overton ( - )	Devin Moran	Tim McCreadie A
1	DIRTcar Nationals (Night #9)	Tim McCreadie	Coffey-McCreadie Enterprises	Brandon Overton ( - )	Mason Zeigler	Mike Marlar B
2	DIRTcar Nationals (Night #10)	Dale McDowell	Shane McDowell Racing	Dale McDowell ( - )	Chase Junghans	Scott Bloomquist A
2	DIRTcar Nationals (Night #10)	Dale McDowell	Shane McDowell Racing	Dale McDowell ( - )	Tim McCreadie	Chris Madden B
3	DIRTcar Nationals (Night #11)	Scott Bloomquist	Scott Bloomquist	Dale McDowell ( +10 )	Kyle Bronson	Scott Bloomquist A
3	DIRTcar Nationals (Night #11)	Scott Bloomquist	Scott Bloomquist	Dale McDowell ( +10 )	Josh Richards	Mike Norris B
4	DIRTcar Nationals (Night #12)	Brandon Sheppard	Mark Richards Racing	Chub Frank ( +21 )	David Breazeale	Tyler Millwood A
4	DIRTcar Nationals (Night #12)	Brandon Sheppard	Mark Richards Racing	Chub Frank ( +21 )	Rick Eckert	Scott Bloomquist B
5	Queen City Shootout (Night #1)	Brandon Sheppard	Mark Richards Racing	Brent Larson ( - )	Chris Ferguson	Billy Moyer A
5	Queen City Shootout (Night #1)	Brandon Sheppard	Mark Richards Racing	Brent Larson ( - )	Billy Moyer Jr.	Rick Rickman B
6	Queen City Shootout (Night #2)	Billy Moyer Jr.	Moyer Motorsports	Mike Marlar ( +20 )	Timothy Culp	Neil Baggett A
6	Queen City Shootout (Night #2)	Billy Moyer Jr.	Moyer Motorsports	Mike Marlar ( +20 )	Jack Sullivan	Brian Rickman B
7	Tennessee Tipoff (Night #1)	Chris Madden	CMR	Brandon Overton ( +11 )	Brandon Overton	Chris Madden
8	Tennessee Tipoff (Night #2)	Dale McDowell	Shane McDowell Racing	Shane Clanton ( +7 )	Chub Frank	Dakotah Knuckles
9	Lavonia	Brandon Sheppard	Mark Richards Racing	Rick Eckert +10	Chase Junghans	Devin Moran
10	Cherokee	Mike Marlar	Delk Equipment Racing	Tyler Erb +11	Morgan Bagley	Chris Ferguson
11	Senoia	Chris Madden	CMR	Dale McDowell +14	Dale McDowell	Mike Marlar A
11	Senoia	Chris Madden	CMR	Dale McDowell +14	Brent Larson	Chris Madden B
12	First In Flight 100	Jimmy Owens	Ramirez Motorsports	Chris Madden +18	Dustin Mitchell	Devin Moran A
12	First In Flight 100	Jimmy Owens	Ramirez Motorsports	Chris Madden +18	Brent Larson	Jimmy Owens B
13	411	Cory Hedgecock		Chris Madden +8	Casey Roberts	Jimmy Owens
14	Bulls Gap	Jimmy Owens	Ramirez Motorsports	Shane Clanton +13	-	Chris Madden
15	Stateline	Brandon Sheppard	Mark Richards Racing	Max Blair +10	Chub Frank	Chris Madden
15	Stateline	Brandon Sheppard	Mark Richards Racing	Max Blair +10	Breyton Santee	Rick Eckert
16	Ransomville	Mike Marlar		Rick Eckert +8	-	Mike Marlar
17	Wayne County	Brandon Sheppard	Mark Richards Racing	Brent Larson +11	Matt Lux	Brandon Sheppard
18	Firecracker 100 - Prelim Night #1	Chris Madden		Mike Norris +10	Darrell Langian	Mike Marlar
18	Firecracker 100 - Prelim Night #1	Chris Madden		Mike Norris +10	Jared Miley	Brandon Sheppard
19	Firecracker 100 - Prelim Night #2	Mike Norris		Brent Larson +7	Michael Maresca	Mike Marlar
19	Firecracker 100 - Prelim Night #2	Mike Norris		Brent Larson +7	Gregg Satterlee	Mike Norris
20	Firecracker 100	Chris Madden		Shane Clanton +10	Shane Clanton	-
20	Firecracker 100	Chris Madden		Shane Clanton +10	Jared Miley	-
21	vs. Summer Nationals @ Terre Haute	Devin Moran		Tyler Erb +11	-	Devin Moran
21	vs. Summer Nationals @ Terre Haute	Devin Moran		Tyler Erb +11	-	Shane Clanton
21	vs. Summer Nationals @ Terre Haute	Devin Moran		Tyler Erb +11	-	Chris Madden

== See also ==
- 2018 World of Outlaws Craftsman Sprint Car Series
- 2018 Super DIRTcar Series
