= Grandview Speedway =

Race track in Bechtelsville, Pennsylvania

Coordinates: 40.373°N 75.610°W

The Greatest Show on Dirt
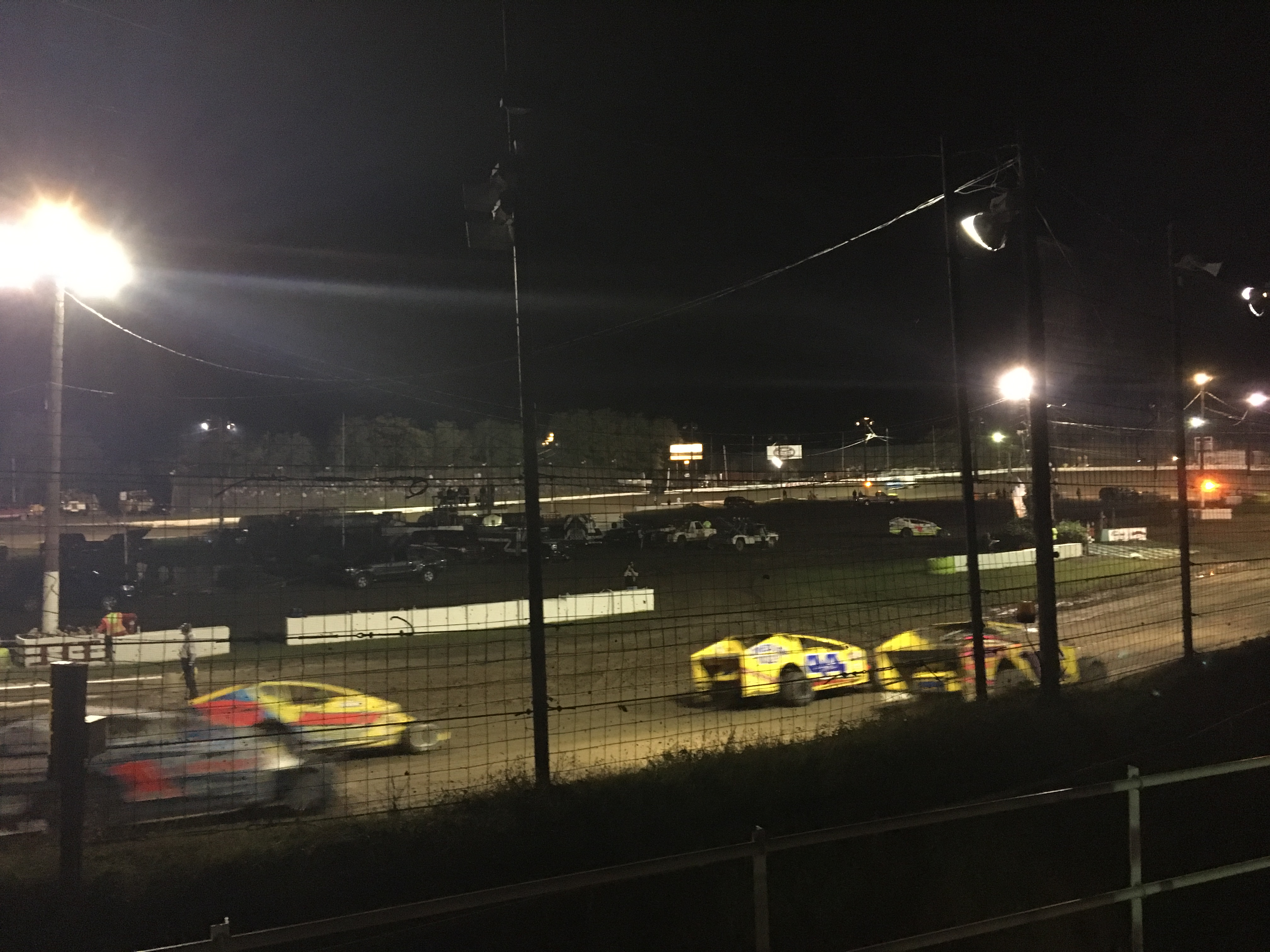
- Modified race at Grandview Speedway
- Location: Washington Township, Berks County, near Bechtelsville, Pennsylvania
- Capacity: ~5,000
- Owner: Bruce Rogers
- Operator: Bruce Rogers
- Broke ground: 1962
- Opened: 1963
- Major events: Freedom 76; USAC National Sprint Cars; USAC National Midgets; Pennsylvania Speedweek; All Star Circuit of Champions; Thunder on the Hill Racing Series

Oval
- Surface: Clay
- Length: 0.332 mi (0.535 km)
- Turns: 4
- Race lap record: 0:11.243 (Aaron Reutzel, Baughman-Reutzel Motorsports, 2018, 410 ASCOC Sprints)

Grandview Speedway is a one third-mile automobile race track located just east of Bechtelsville, Pennsylvania, United States. Featuring moderately high banks and a wide racing surface, it is suitable for close racing and passing. The track is sanctioned by NASCAR in the NASCAR Advance Auto Parts Weekly Series.

== History ==
The track opened in 1963 and was built by Forrest Rogers after construction started in 1962. The track was originally planned as a ¼ mile (402 meters) asphalt track in Pottstown, Pennsylvania. Eventually this was changed to a larger dirt track in Bechtelsville, Pennsylvania. The track opened on August 11, 1963. Forrest Rogers died of a heart attack in 1966. His son, Bruce Rogers, took control of the race track and operated until he died in 2017. The Rogers family continues to operate the track.

== Weekly races ==
It features a regular weekly series of modified, sportsman modified.

== Special events ==
The track's signature event is the Freedom 76, a modified event in mid-September. The track has a date on the Pennsylvania Speedweeks of winged 410 sprint cars. Touring series that have raced at the track include: USAC National Sprint Cars, USAC National Midget cars, All Star Circuit of Champions, and the World of Outlaws Sprint Cars.

=== Freedom 76 Champions ===
==== 1971 to 2010 ====
Year	Driver	Year	Driver
1971	Ed Mumford	1991	Billy Pauch
1972	Glenn Fitzcharles	1992	Billy Pauch
1973	Roger Knappenberger	1993	Duane Howard
1974	Mike Erb	1994	Chip Slocum
1975	Ed Mumford	1995	Donny Erb
1976	Pete Damiani	1996	Billy Pauch
1977	Doug Carlyle	1997	Duane Howard
1978	Bobby Hauer	1998	Billy Pauch
1979	John Blackey	1999	Duane Howard
1980	Paul Lotier	2000	Billy Pauch
1981	Fred Rahmer	2001	Craig Von Dohren
1982	Smokey Warren	2002	Meme DeSantis
1983	Fred Rahmer	2003	Jeff Strunk
1984	Doug Hoffman	2004	Jeff Strunk
1985	Craig Von Dohren	2005	Ray Swinehart
1986	Tom Mayberry	2006	Craig Von Dohren
1987	Davey Wenger	2007	Jeff Strunk
1988	Billy Pauch	2008	Craig Von Dohren
1989	Billy Schinkel	2009	Meme DeSantis
1990	Kenny Brightbill	2010	Meme DeSantis
==== 2011 to present ====
Year	Driver	Year	Driver
2011	Duane Howard	2021	Ryan Godown
2012	Jeff Strunk	2022	Craig Von Dohren
2013	Jeff Strunk	2023	Ryan Godown
2014	Stewart Friesen	2024	Alex Yankowski
2015	Craig Von Dohren	2025	Eddie Strada
2016	Jeff Strunk	2026	Louden Reimert
2017	Jeff Strunk		
2018	Duane Howard		
2019	Mike Gular		
2020	Jeff Strunk		

See also

- Bedford Speedway
- Eriez Speedway
- Lake Erie Speedway, Erie County, south of North East, Pennsylvania
- Nazareth Speedway
- Pocono Raceway
