= Duane Howard (racing driver) =

American Dirt Modified racing driver (born 1963)

- Born: Duane L. Howard; June 5, 1963 (age 63) Oley, Pennsylvania, U.S.

Modified racing career
- Debut season: 1985
- Car number: 4,15g,66,85,114,126,357
- Championships: 20
- Wins: 274

Previous series
- 1983-1984 1981-1982: Late model Kart racing

Championship titles
- 2007, 2010, 2012, 2014, 2019 NASCAR Pennsylvania State Champion; 2010, 2012, 2013, 2014 American Racer Cup
- Statistics up to date as of January 31, 2026.

Duane Howard (June 5, 1963) is an American Dirt Modified racing driver, credited with over 270 career wins at tracks in the Mid-Atlantic (United States).

== Racing career ==
Duane Howard grew up racing go-karts against fellow Oley, Pennsylvania, resident Craig Von Dohren, and after seeing Von Dohren move on to stock cars, began racing late models at Silver Spring Speedway, Pennsylvania. Howard transitioned to modifieds and in 1989 claimed his first Pennsylvania Tri-Track Championship, teaming with car owner Buddy Biever for weekly 358 modified racing at Big Diamond Speedway in Pottsville, Grandview Speedway in Bechtelsville, and Penn National Speedway in Grantville.

Howard won the first of five NASCAR Pennsylvania state championships in 2007. Along the way, he claimed individual track championships at Big Diamond, Grandview, and Bridgeport Speedway, New Jersey.

He also competed successfully at venues throughout northeast, including New York at Accord Speedway, Five Mile Point Speedway in Kirkwood, Fulton Speedway, and the Syracuse Mile; in Delaware at Delaware International Speedway in Delmar and Georgetown Speedway; at New Egypt Speedway, New Jersey; and in Pennsylvania at Penn Can Speedway in Susquehanna, Selinsgrove Speedway, Susquehanna Speedway in York.

Duane Howard was inducted into the Northeast Dirt Modified Hall of Fame in 2025.
