= Wissota Promoters Association =

- Sport: Dirt track racing
- Jurisdiction: United States; Canada
- Abbreviation: WISSOTA
- Founded: 1981
- Headquarters: St. Cloud, Minnesota, U.S.
- President: Tim Carlson

Official website
- www.wissota.org
- Other key staff: Nikki Cook

Wissota Promoters Association is a sanctioning, marketing and rule-making organization aligned with oval dirt track and select asphalt auto racing in the United States and Canada.

== History ==
Wissota Promoters Association was founded in 1981 by eight track promoters in Wisconsin and Minnesota, with intent to offer uniform rules for the promoters and drivers involved in the Late Model division. In 1984, a voluntary steering committee was formed to oversee the business aspects that developed and to guide the future of the group's racing divisions. That steering committee evolved into a board of directors, and the non-profit racing organization became incorporated in 1986.

== Overview ==
The Wissota Promoters Association sanctions local and regional dirt track racing events under the WISSOTA Auto Racing brand in the United States region of Wisconsin, Minnesota, North Dakota, South Dakota, Montana, Wyoming, and Idaho, along with the Canadian provinces of Ontario, Alberta and Manitoba. The organization supports eight racecar divisions including Late Models, Modifieds, Street Stocks and Hornets. Since 1999 WISSOTA has presented its own Late Model Challenge touring series at Upper Great Plains venues.

Promoters who join the organization become, in essence, part owners of the racing organization and are expected to contribute to its overall success. Each November, the WISSOTA annual meeting is held; the member promoters gather annually in this forum to discuss the future of the organization. Member promoters are given the opportunity to vote on all organizational policies and procedures as well as rules for competition in the various racing divisions. WISSOTA’s member promoters and racing associations have spent approximately 30 years of hard work at the annual meetings crafting unique rules for each of the divisions.
