= Doping in auto racing =

Some racing drivers have used doping in auto racing to enhance their performance. Deemed unsafe and illegal by the Fédération Internationale de l'Automobile, appendix A to the International Sporting Code determines which substances are banned and mandates penalties.

== Appendix A to the International Sporting Code ==
The Appendix regarding doping in auto racing was added on 1 December 2010 after consultation with the World Anti-Doping Agency (WADA). The regulations apply to all FIA and national sanctioned events. The FIA adopts the banned substance list issued by WADA. The FIA has added alcohol and beta blockers to the list. The FIA will test at random from a pre determined pool of drivers. The national sanctioning body will test a number of athletes during their events.

In case of a positive doping test, the driver in question will be disqualified, have his/hers results forfeited and has to return all their winnings. In case of negligence by the driver will only be disqualified for the event on hand. In case of a second violation the driver will be banned from the sport for six months. More severe penalties could be imposed, depending on the circumstances. The driver has to pay back prize money won. A fine of up to €15,000 can be imposed.

== IndyCar ==
Since the series inception in 1996, IndyCar has a substance abuse policy in place. The policy is applied to all series sanctioned by IndyCar, currently the IndyCar Series, Indy Lights, Pro Mazda, USF2000 and Global MX-5 Cup. Drivers, crew and officials can be subjected to testing (depending on the series). The IndyCar organisation can subject subjects to test at random. IndyCar may require a drug test also in events of 'reasonable suspicion'. Reasonable suspicion includes, but is not limited to, violent temper or an accident during the event. When a driver is tested positive for performance enhancing drugs (PED) the driver will be suspended for one year. A fine of $5,000 wil also be imposed. With a non-PED positive test (alcohol for example) the driver will be suspended for no less than sixty days. A fine of $2,500 wil also be imposed.

In the case of multiple violations the driver will be penalized again. The height of the penalty will be determined by the specific circumstances. The driver may return to competition after psychological and medical evaluation.

== NASCAR ==
=== Drivers ===
NASCAR has its own anti doping regulations. The substance abuse policy was first implemented in the late 1980s. In 2007, Truck Series driver Aaron Fike was arrested for heroin possession; Fike admitted to using black tar heroin during race weekends. He was suspended by NASCAR until 2012, when he completed NASCAR's Road to Recovery program. In 2009, Jeremy Mayfield failed a drug test for methamphetamine. After sitting out the initial penalty, Mayfield tested positive again. Mayfield could return to NASCAR competition after completing the Road to Recovery. The driver however has questioned the credibility of the testing laboratory recognized by NASCAR (NASCAR later switched drug testing laboratories in 2017).

Following the cases of Fike and Mayfield, the policy was overhauled. In 2012, A. J. Allmendinger was suspended after testing positive for Adderall, which he said he took unknowingly. Allmendinger's suspension was lifted in September of that year.

In 2018, Spencer Gallagher won his first NASCAR Xfinity Series race on 28 April. On 1 May Gallagher was suspended indefinitely for violating the substance abuse policy and agreed to join the Road to Recovery program, missing 7 races before the suspension was lifted.

After testing positive for a banned substance, the person in question is suspended indefinitely. To return to competition the person needs to complete the NASCAR Road to Recovery and have a Road to Recovery Plan approved. The plan includes treatment, rehabilitation, counseling and other measures necessary to prevent repetition.

=== Crew ===
Because of the nature of the NASCAR garage, drivers and crew members can be tested by the organisation, especially because performance enhancing drugs can be abused by crew members. Crew chief Todd Parrott, for driver Aric Almirola, tested positive for an 'undisclosed substance'. The NASCAR policy is consistent with the FIA's policy. Germain Racings Matt Borland crew chief for Ty Dillon in the NASCAR Monster Energy Cup Series tested positive for a banned substance. Borland declared that the substance, methylhexanamine (also known as DMAA), was a result of him drinking diet coffee for the last six months. Germain Racing retained Borland as crew chief to return after the Road to Recovery program.

== USAC ==
The United States Auto Club has implemented a substance abuse policy since 2008. USAC also has a self determined list of banned substances, with the exclusion of prescription medication (used in accordance with the purpose and instruction). The policy states that USAC has to have reasonable suspicion that banned substances are used. The policy states (but is not limited to) a list of symptoms for drug use including alcohol. USAC also has the right to test at random. With a positive test for alcohol or other drugs the USAC Director of Competition may suspend the driver indefinitely. After the failure of a drug test, the driver can return to competition after a negative drug test after the suspension period. After a failed alcohol test, the driver only has to sit out the suspended period. In both cases the driver will be subjected to more frequent tests in the future.

== World Racing Group ==
#	Fine	Banned from competition
First offense	$1.000	60–90 days
Second offense	$2.500	120–180 days
Third offense	$5.000	365 days

The furor over when sprint car driver Kevin Ward, Jr. was killed at a New York state dirt track exposed toxicology reports finding he had marijuana led to the World Racing Group, sanctioning body of the World of Outlaws and DIRTcar series, started regularly testing the sprint car and late model series drivers in 2017. Drivers will only be tested through urinalysis. The random selection process will take place on the day of the event, treating full season drivers and part-time drivers equally. After a positive test, the driver receives a fine and will be banned from competition. After three failed tests (and three penalties) the driver can only return to competition after two negative tests and approval from World Racing Group.

Justin Ratliff was the first driver hit with a penalty. Ratliff refused a drug test after the 2017 DIRTcar Nationals at Volusia Speedway Park in February. Because of the refusal Ratliff was fined in accordance of the first offense with a 90-day suspension. In June 2017, Brian Lay tested positive after the World of Outlaws event at Eldora Speedway. He was also fined in accordance with a first offense. In July Jacob Hawkins failed a drug test after the Dirt Late Model Dream event at Eldora Speedway.

Dirt racing champion Scott Bloomquist had two run ins with the doping tests in 2018. After winning the 2018 Dirt Late Model Dream Bloomquist was selected for a drug test. However the champion fell after the victory ceremony. He sustained a rotator cuff injury and was brought into hospital, evading the drug test. Later in the season Bloomquist was selected as part of 16 drivers to perform a drug test after the World of Outlaws Late Model Series at Lernerville Speedway. Bloomquist had five hours to deliver a urine sample, being requested by the organisation multiple times. As Bloomquist refused, he was suspended for 90 days. Another driver, Justin Peck tested positive for a marijuana metabolite. He was suspended for 90 days after the race at Eldora Speedway. During the 2018 season a fourth case came forward. World of Outlaws driver Chris Martin tested positive for a marijuana metabolite after the Knoxville Nationals. Martin was suspended for 90 days.

== IMCA ==
The International Motor Contest Association, the oldest active motorsports sanctioning body in the United States, has regulations with regard to drugs. The 2017 IMCA General Rules and Procedures state the following with regard to drugs, in particular alcohol: Consumption of alcoholic beverage by driver or his/her crew in advance of, or while competing in any IMCA sanctioned program is strictly forbidden. Any driver showing evidence of alcohol consumption will be required to leave the premises immediately and may be subject to a fine of no less than $250. Use of illegal drugs at any time shall be cause for immediate, indefinite suspension and/or fine of no less than $250.

== Stock Car Brasil ==
The Stock Car Brasil organisation has had a number of run-ins with doping offenders over the years. The Stock Car Brasil organisation is subjected to Brazilian Auto Racing Confederation (CBA) anti doping legislation. This legislation is based on the rules issued by the FIA. After the death of Rafael Sperafico in 2007 fellow driver Renato Russo expressed his concerns about the safety situation in the Brazilian racing series. Not only regarding its lack of an anti drug policy, but also regarding safety equipments (helmets, seatbelts and such). Stock Car Light driver Paulo Salustiano was the first driver penalised by the new system. Salustiano tested positive for Finasteride, claiming it was in a hair product, after the first race of the 2008 season. He was stripped of the win and points from the race, along with being assessed a 30-day suspension by CBA under FIA rules.

Former Minardi Formula One driver Tarso Marques tested positive for anabolic steroids. Marques tested positive after the final race of the 2009 season. Marques continued to compete pending an appeal. The suspension was upheld and Marques was suspended from competition for two years. Two drivers received penalties after the Velopark round in 2012. Alceu Feldmann received a 24-month suspension after refusing to take a drugtest. Fellow driver Marcos Gomes took the drug test and tested positive. Gomes returned to competition after 30 days suspension. Raphael Matos and Lucas Foresti were suspended during the 2015 season. Foresti tested positive for anabolic steroids, the use of which he denied. The Brazilian Automobile Confederation suspended the licence of Matos for two years. Matos returned to competition in the ACCUS-governed Sports Car Club of America-sanctioned Trans-Am Series after his suspension expired in the 2017 Motor City 100 finishing second in the TA2 class. By rule, since the CBA and ACCUS (which the SCCA is a member club) are both FIA member clubs, each is required to honour such FIA-related drug suspensions.

== Argentine Automobile Club ==
The Argentine Automobile Club has had anti-doping regulations in place since 1998. The anti-doping resolution determines that, in auto racing, random drug tests must be carried out. The resolutions specifies that it must be carried out during a minimum of four events testing at least two drivers per event in the TC2000 series (Argentina's most prominent racing series). It took until that a racing driver was found positive. Fabián Yannantuoni tested positive for Marijuana after the TC2000 race at Autódromo Eduardo Copello. Yannantuoni was suspended for one year. Yannantuoni got a reduced suspension of 6 months after appealing. He also denies ever consuming marijuana and that the test came positive due to flu medicine he had consumed.

In 2011 Gianfranco Collino, at the time competing in the Formula Renault 2.0 Argentina, tested positive for Marijuana. Collino was initially suspended for one year. An appeal reduced the sentence to six months. Collino returned to the racing series finishing third in the standings in 2012 and eventually graduated into touringcars.

== Notable cases ==
=== Tomáš Enge ===
During the 2002 International Formula 3000 Championship Czech racer Tomáš Enge tested positive after the race at the Hungaroring. Enge raced the remaining rounds of the championship while there was an investigation. The Czech driver went on to win the championship, however the FIA determined in October that the test was positive and Enge was disqualified from the Hungaroring round. Enge dropped to third in the championship standings and Sébastien Bourdais was the official champion. In 2012 Enge again tested positive for a banned substance. After the 2012 FIA GT1 Navarra round Enge tested positive, him claiming it was a drug for medical purposes. The FIA banned Enge from motorsports for 18 months. He returned to competition in 2014 racing in the Blancpain Endurance Series.

=== Igor Waliłko ===
Twelve year old Igor Waliłko tested positive after a round of the German Karting Championship. Waliłko tested positive for Nikethamide and was initially suspended for two years. After appeal the sentence was reduced to 18 months. Waliłko resumed in competitive karting after his suspension. He also made the switch to car racing in Euroformula Open and Porsche Carrera Cup.

=== Franck Montagny ===
Montagny tested positive for a cocaine derivative (Benzoylecgonine) after the 2014 Putrajaya ePrix. Montagny was disqualified from the race but kept his championship points and podium finish from the previous race. The 37-year old was banned from motorsport for two years after a second test also proved positive. The Frenchman publicly feared that the ban would be the effective end to his racing career. His ban was lifted on 23 December 2016 but he has not competed since.

=== Anthony Kumpen ===
Former FIA GT1 driver and two-time NASCAR Whelen Euro Series Elite 1 champion Anthony Kumpen tested positive for amphetamines after the 2018 24 Hours of Zolder. The multiple winner of the event was immediately barred from competition. It was first reported that Kumpen was recovering from injuries sustained after a crash at Tours Speedway (even though the 2018 24 Hours of Zolder was after that event). During the hearings of the positive drug test Kumpen claimed he used an ADHD medicine Dexedrine which caused the positive test. The commission investigated and found no doctors receipt or evidence of this medication at his home. Therefore, the Flemish anti-doping agency suspended Kumpen from competition for four years and a fine of €2,000.

=== Nick Leventis ===
As winners of the 2018 California 8 Hours GT3 Pro-Am class the Strakka Racing squad of Leventis, David Fumanelli and Felipe Fraga were subject to a mandatory doping test. The sample provided by Leventis was found positive for Anastrozole (reduces estrogen conversion when using external testosterone) and Drostanolone (anabolic–androgenic steroid). The whole Strakka Racing squad was disqualified from the results. Leventis was informed 21 January 2019 and informed the FIA of his retirement from motorsports on 19 February 2019. His ban ran until 28 October 2022.
