= Jeremy Mayfield =

American racing driver (born 1969)

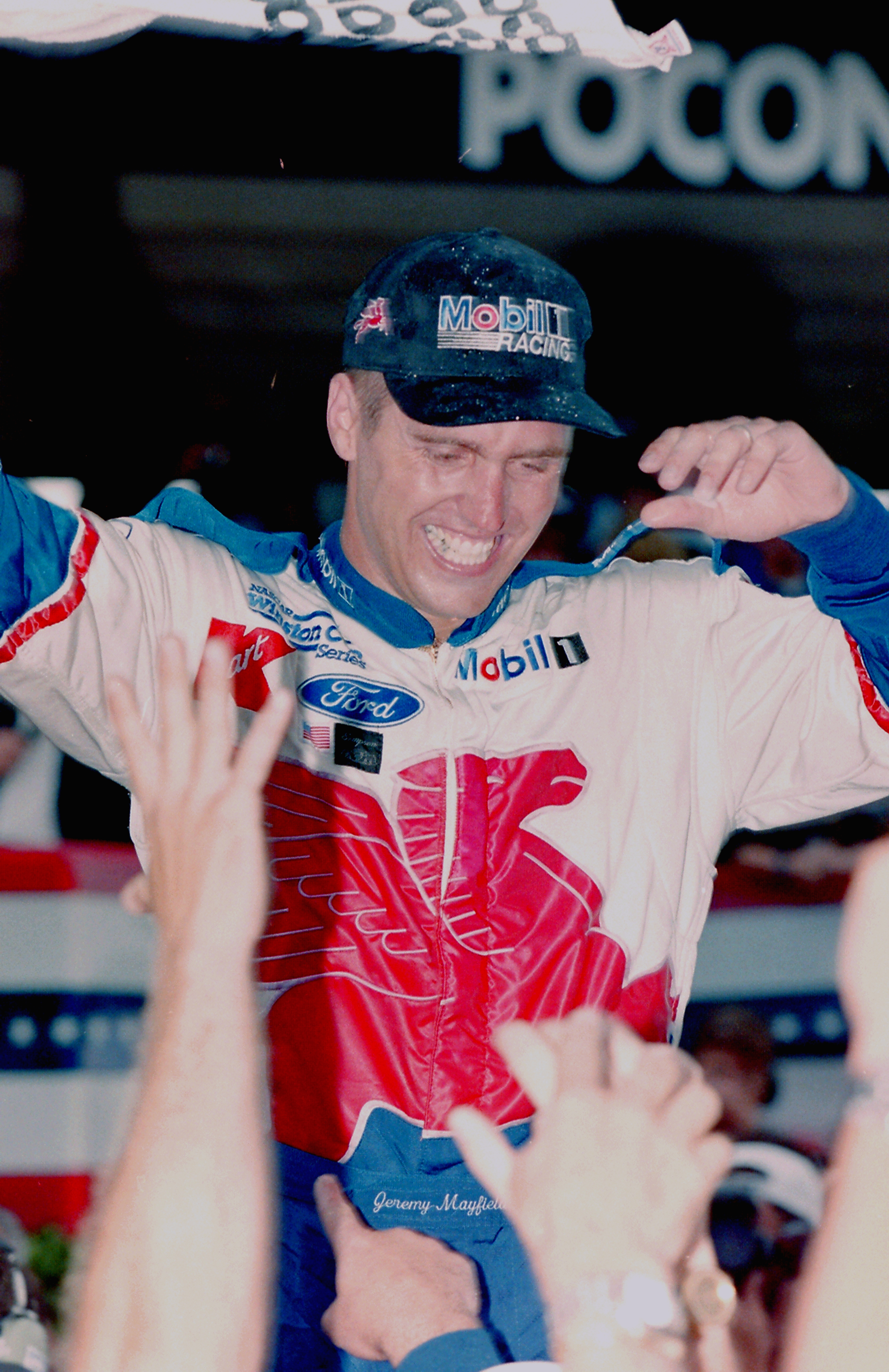
- Mayfield celebrating after winning the 1998 Pocono 500
- Born: Jeremy Allen Mayfield; May 27, 1969 (age 57); Owensboro, Kentucky, U.S.
- Awards: 1993 ARCA Hooters SuperCar Series Rookie of the Year

NASCAR Cup Series career
- 433 races run over 17 years
- Best finish: 7th (1998)
- First race: 1993 Mello Yello 500 (Charlotte)
- Last race: 2009 Crown Royal Presents the Russell Friedman 400 (Richmond)
- First win: 1998 Pocono 500 (Pocono)
- Last win: 2005 GFS Marketplace 400 (Michigan)
Wins	Top tens	Poles
5	96	9

NASCAR O'Reilly Auto Parts Series career
- 36 races run over 6 years
- Best finish: 43rd (1996)
- First race: 1995 Goodwrench 200 (Rockingham)
- Last race: 2006 Stater Brothers 300 (Fontana)
Wins	Top tens	Poles
0	5	0

NASCAR FedEx Freight Truck Series career
- 3 races run over 2 years
- Best finish: 65th (2006)
- First race: 2003 Hardee's 200 (Charlotte)
- Last race: 2006 EasyCare Vehicle Service Contracts (Atlanta)
Wins	Top tens	Poles
0	1	0
- Statistics up to date as of December 19, 2012.

Jeremy Allen Mayfield (born May 27, 1969) is an American semi-retired professional stock car racing driver who has most recently competed in the IHRA Stock Car Series driving the No. 19 car for D2 Motorsports. He drove cars for the Sadler brothers, T.W. Taylor, Cale Yarborough, Michael Kranefuss, Roger Penske, Ray Evernham, Bill Davis, and Gene Haas. In 2009, he drove for his own team, Mayfield Motorsports.

On May 9, 2009, Mayfield was suspended indefinitely as both owner and driver by NASCAR following what the company said was a positive test for methamphetamine. A federal judge weighed the evidence and temporarily lifted the suspension on July 1 of that same year. On July 15, NASCAR said Mayfield had tested positive for methamphetamine for the second time after failing a random drug test on July 6. On July 24, a federal appeals court overturned the previous injunction Mayfield had been awarded, leaving him suspended from the sport.

== Racing career ==
=== Beginnings ===
Mayfield began racing in his hometown of Owensboro, Kentucky, racing BMX bicycles. He then proceeded to race go-karts at local Short tracks; moving to Nashville Speedway USA at the age of nineteen. He soon went to work for Sadler Brothers Racing as a fabricator, and became their driver, winning Late Model Rookie of the Year at Kentucky Motor Speedway in 1987.

In 1993, Mayfield joined the ARCA series, and was named Rookie of the Year.

=== NASCAR ===
Mayfield made his Cup debut in the 1993 Mello Yello 500; starting 30th and finishing 29th in the No. 95 Earl Sadler-owned Ford Thunderbird. In 1994, Mayfield declared he would run for NASCAR Winston Cup Series Rookie of the Year, and signed to drive the Sadler Brothers' No. 95 Ford. He resumed his role as that team's sheetmetal man in 1995, and signed to drive the No. 02 for T.W. Taylor, for four races before completing the year in the No. 98 Fingerhut Ford for Cale Yarborough. He ran twenty starts in his inaugural season, his best finish a nineteenth at Rockingham. In 1995, he stayed with Yarborough full-time, and had an eighth-place run at the Miller Genuine Draft 500, with a 31st-place finish in the points standings after qualifying for 27 out of 31 races. The next season, he had two top-fives and earned his first career pole at the DieHard 500 Later that season, he and John Andretti of the No. 37 Ford owned by Michael Kranefuss and Carl Haas, negotiated to begin their next year's contracts (in each other's then rides) early. Mayfield ended the year 26th in points.

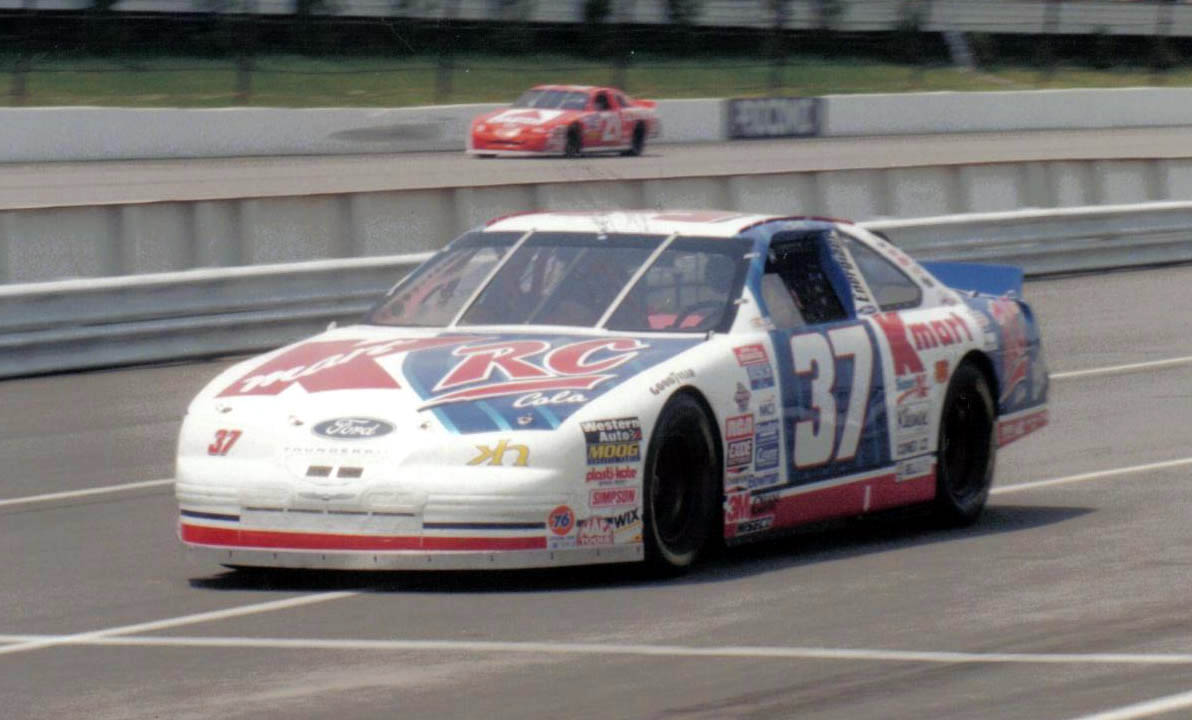
1997 racecar

Mayfield formally joined the Kranefuss-Haas team in 1997. He had eight top-tens, including two 5th-place runs, and finished a then career-high 13th place in points. After the season, Carl Haas' interests in the team were sold to Penske Racing South, and the team's identity was changed, with a new number (No. 12). Mayfield took the points lead early in the season, and won his first career race at the Pocono 500. At the end of the season, he ranked a career best seventh in the point standings, with one win, twelve top-five finishes, sixteen top-ten finishes, and one pole. In 1999, he dropped four spots in the standings, despite twelve top-tens. In 2000, he won four poles and two races. Mayfield's third Cup series win and his second of 2000 is probably the most famous of all his wins, as he bumped Dale Earnhardt out of the lead in the last turn and then used Earnhardt's famous "Rattle his cage" line against Earnhardt in victory lane.

One of the poles, however, was at the DieHard 500, and the car was found to have violated the rules and penalties resulted in the team earning -25 points from the race (his 126 points, earned by finishing fourteenth and leading a lap, were offset by the 151-point penalty NASCAR handed down). Later, while practicing for the Brickyard 400, he crashed hard into the wall. He suffered a concussion and was forced to miss the next two races. He finished 24th in points that season as a result of also having 11 DNF's (including six in a row).

Mayfield began 2001 with two consecutive third-place finishes, but was released after the Protection One 400. Rumors circulated around the garage that he had burned bridges with Roger Penske in order to sign a new deal with Ray Evernham's team. Rusty Wallace added the next year, that he did not see head to head with Jeremy Mayfield as teammates and that they feuded several times. He later provided Jeremy Mayfield with a driving contract in Wallace's lower-tier team in 2005 as a sign of his regret.

In 2002, Mayfield signed to Evernham Motorsports, replacing Casey Atwood. In his first year, Mayfield had four top-tens and finished 26th in points. He improved in 2003, winning the pole at the Aaron's 499 and posting twelve top-tens, finishing nineteenth in points. In 2004, Mayfield returned to victory lane at the Chevy Rock and Roll 400 to move his team into the ninth spot in the inaugural Chase for the Cup, and finished tenth in points. For a while, winning a race to get into the Chase was referred by the moniker "pulling a Jeremy Mayfield." In 2005, he won the GFS Marketplace 400, and finished ninth in the standings. In August 2006 he was released from Evernham (see below). Evernham used Bill Elliott and then Elliott Sadler for the remainder of the season.

Mayfield signed a contract with Bill Davis Racing for 2007, driving the No. 36 Toyota Camry. He ran a total of 13 races for Bill Davis Racing in 32 attempts with a best finish of 22nd at Kansas Speedway. In August 2007, it was announced that Mayfield and Davis would part ways at the end of the season.

Later in the season, Mayfield would take over driving the No. 66 car for Haas CNC Racing (then wholly owned by Gene Haas, no relation to Carl Haas, above) starting with Atlanta 2007. Late in 2007, he and teammate Scott Riggs would switch rides putting Mayfield in the No. 70 car (later to become the Stewart-Haas No. 14 car) at the beginning the 2008 season.

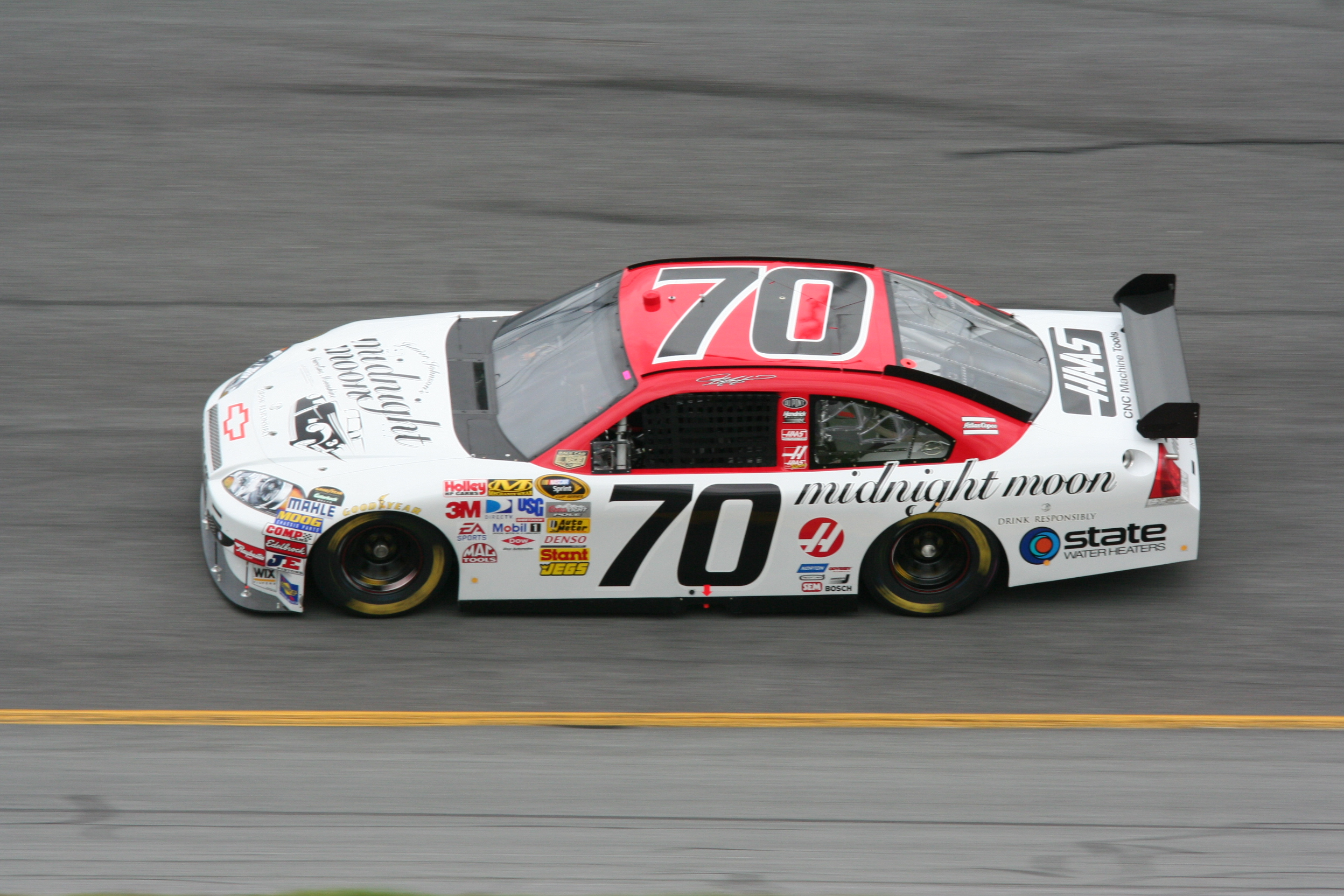
2008 racecar

Mayfield completed seven races in the No. 70 with a best finish of sixteenth before he was released from the team. After July 9, 2008, Tony Stewart was able to announce his purchase into the Haas CNC team and the lineup of drivers to replace Riggs and Mayfield.

Mayfield would complete one additional race at Dover in the No. 40 Dodge, filling in for the injured Dario Franchitti. He would start tenth and finish 25th.

After failing to get a ride for the 2009 season, on January 19, 2009, Mayfield and his wife announced that he started his own team, Mayfield Motorsports. Mayfield would attempt the full season in a self-owned Toyota, using the number 41 (the number and owner points was purchased from Chip Ganassi Racing) and borrowing the Evernham-style of numbering. He raced his way into the Daytona 500 successfully. After ten races in the 2009 season, Mayfield qualified for just five. He was then embroiled in a substance abuse dispute that, for all intents and purposes, ended his NASCAR career. By July 2009, Mayfield had sold his race team and operations due to lack of sponsorship, and all members of the race team either resigned or were laid off.

During his NASCAR career, Mayfield had 36 career Busch Series starts. He had five top-tens, his best finish being a fourth at Rockingham in 2003. He also had three Craftsman Truck Series starts, with a best finish of sixth at the 2003 Hardee's 200 for Green Light Racing. After his release from Evernham in 2006, he drove for Billy Ballew Motorsports in a pair of truck races.

== Life after NASCAR ==
Mayfield was working as a delivery person while waiting for word on his appeals. By 2011, tax officials in Catawba County, North Carolina were on the verge of foreclosing on Mayfield's 388-acre spread there because he owed $82,000 in back taxes. In 2012, Mayfield was evicted from his home and was planned to drive in the ARCA series for Carter 2 Motorsports, although this deal fell through. On January 6, 2014, Mayfield was convicted on two counts of possession of drug paraphernalia and one count for possessing stolen items, receiving eighteen months of unsupervised probation, and was ordered to pay $88,124.41, adding an extra $1,100 in court costs.

In 2014, Mayfield raced in the KOMA Unwind Modified Madness Tour, making his debut in the series' inaugural race at Hickory Motor Speedway. In May 2014, Mayfield released a video, titled The Mayfield Story, to explain the substance abuse controversy from his point of view.

In July 2014, Mayfield returned to organized racing competition, driving in a Pro Cup Series event at Tri-County Motor Speedway and finishing seventh of the ten cars that started. On September 29, 2014, Mayfield announced he would compete full-time in dirt and Super Late Model racing for 2015. On October 8, 2014, Mayfield started a Dirt Late Model team with plans to compete full-time in the World of Outlaws, with Mayfield as driver of the J2 car and Aaron Thomas as owner; former Charlotte Motor Speedway president Humpy Wheeler is an assistant for Mayfield.

Mayfield currently competes around the northwest of the state of Georgia at local dirt tracks.

Mayfield earned his first career Late Model win on November 26, 2018, at Lavonia Speedway, which was his first race win in any division of motorsports, since his final Cup victory of his racing career in 2005. Afterwards, an emotional Mayfield called it the "biggest win of my life."

"It feels great to get these guys into victory lane," said Mayfield afterwards. "We've come close several times, and finally we get to snap that win drought. These guys put a great car under me today, and I couldn't be happier."

By 2020, Mayfield had mended his bridges with Ray Evernham and showed interest as a possible participant in the Superstar Racing Experience (SRX) series created by Evernham and Tony Stewart. He would not make a start however, as the series folded after the 2023 season.

Beginning in 2023, Mayfield has been a regular in the Grand National Super Series Presented By ECC, capturing multiple victories and titles.

== Personal life ==
He currently lives in Denver, North Carolina. Mayfield has been married twice and has no children.

== Controversies ==
=== Release from Evernham Motorsports ===
On August 8, 2006, Mayfield learned through NASCAR.com that he was not placed onto the entry list for Watkins Glen, instead replaced by former Evernham driver Bill Elliott. The No. 19 team falling out of the top 35 in points was initially given as the reason for Mayfield's release. Evernham later confirmed that Mayfield had been released from his contract after making comments about Evernham not being at the track often. Mayfield later stated that the problems with the 19 car stemmed from lack of attention from the team owner due to a "close personal relationship" with developmental driver Erin Crocker. Mayfield stated that Evernham was not with the Cup cars most weeks because of the extensive attention that he was giving Crocker and her No. 98 truck team. Evernham later admitted that he was seriously involved in an affair with Crocker, whom he married in 2009.

=== Substance abuse violation ===
On May 9, 2009, Mayfield was suspended indefinitely by NASCAR for violating NASCAR's substance abuse policy. Owing to NASCAR policy, David Black, whose company (Aegis Sciences Corporation) oversees NASCAR's testing program, refused to specify the substance for which Mayfield tested positive, instead saying it was "a drug of concern."

Mayfield stated: "I believe that the combination of a prescribed medicine and an over the counter medicine reacted together and resulted in a positive drug test. My doctor and I are working with both NASCAR consultant Dr. David Black and NASCAR to resolve this matter."

Black disputed Mayfield's claims, stating: "What we have is a clear violation of policy. In my many years of experience, I have never seen a violation like this due to the combination of over-the-counter or prescription products."

However, the week after his suspension, Mayfield stated that he had only taken two tablets of Claritin-D and the prescription drug Adderall, which he stated was prescribed to assist his attention deficit disorder, and that he had never used any sort of illegal drug. His wife, family, friends, fans, crew chief and other team members, drug store receipts, and signed prescription from his care provider backed these claims.

Afterwards, criticism of NASCAR's testing policy became rampant, and several suggested that NASCAR's secrecy over Mayfield's results was politically motivated, so as to not smear the reputation of Claritin, who was a sponsor of Carl Edwards and NASCAR on Fox at the time.

For the Coca-Cola 600 and Sprint All-Star Race Mayfield Motorsports named former Hall of Fame Racing team driver J. J. Yeley as interim driver and Jeremy's wife Shana as the interim owner.

On June 9, 2009, ESPN.com stated that during the random drug screening on May 1 at Richmond International Raceway, Mayfield tested positive for methamphetamine.

A doctor from Florida stated that it was impossible for Mayfield to use the levels of methamphetamine NASCAR claimed he did, or else he would be dead or a chronic user. According to another medical professional in Central Florida, the combination of medications cited by Mayfield has a 15% chance of a false positive being obtained.

On July 1, 2009, US District Court Judge Graham Mullen granted a temporary injunction, lifting Mayfield's suspension. Mullen concluded that the "likelihood of a false positive in this case is quite substantial." In granting the injunction, Mullen ruled that the "harm to Mr. Mayfield significantly outweighs the harm to NASCAR". Even with the injunction, Mayfield was forced to sit out the Coke Zero 400 and LifeLock.com 400 for want of a sponsor.

On July 15, 2009, NASCAR stated that Mayfield had again tested positive for methamphetamine during testing conducted outside of a NASCAR event, at and by entering Jeremy Mayfield's home on July 6, five days after his suspension was lifted. Mayfield continued to deny ever using the drug, and to account for the results by proper use of the OTC drug Claritin D combined with prescription treatment including Adderall. Additionally, Mayfield took a drug test 40 minutes after NASCAR's, this time administered by and at a certified drug-testing laboratory not affiliated with NASCAR, and it was negative.

Lisa Mayfield, the widow of Jeremy Mayfield's father, stated that she was his mother and had seen him use methamphetamines many times since 1998. Jeremy Mayfield rejected these allegations; refuting statements cited the inability for Lisa to have adopted an adult, and adoption being a condition for the claimed relationship. Lisa Mayfield later trespassed on Jeremy's property and assaulted persons whom she found there, resulting in the arrest of Lisa Mayfield. The disputes were settled out of court, and Lisa Mayfield withdrew her claims concerning Jeremy Mayfield.

A federal appeals court reversed Mayfield's injunction on July 24, 2009. On May 18, 2010, Mullen threw out Mayfield's suit, saying that Mayfield waived his right to sue NASCAR for defamation, when he agreed to take part in NASCAR events. Accounts and documents submitted for the case between the two dates, are public record and can be found on PACER.

Mayfield could theoretically return to NASCAR if he completes NASCAR's "Road to Recovery" treatment program and submits to drug testing with a non-WADA-approved lab belonging to Black, the only lab accepted by NASCAR at the time (NASCAR has since replaced their approved drug testing lab in 2017). On the January 8, 2013 episode of the MRN radio show NASCAR Live, hosted by Eli Gold, then-NASCAR CEO Brian France alluded to other options (in addition to the documented "Road to Recovery" plan) that had previously been discussed outside of public knowledge, when Mayfield reached him; these options were not clarified publicly. On the show France continued with statements that Mayfield must follow examples of other re-instated drivers that, as of June 28, 2016, are not participants in NASCAR. Mayfield is adamant about his innocence from NASCAR's charges. In an interview with Sporting News in 2014, Mayfield said he was willing to take a drug test "as long as I can pee in a cup for LabCorp or some other credible lab."

=== Dog attack ===
On April 22, 2011, five dogs owned by Mayfield attacked a mail carrier who drove through the entrance gate past "Beware of Dogs" signs to deliver a package too large for the roadside mailbox. She received several scratches and bite marks on her legs. The dogs were immediately taken, then euthanized. On May 10, 2012, Mayfield was ordered to pay $1 million in the lawsuit of the dog attacks after failing to respond to a lawsuit.

=== 2011 arrest ===
On November 1, 2011, sheriff deputies searched Mayfield's home in Catawba based on an informant's statement that Mayfield and four accomplices were staging burglaries to support Mayfield's methamphetamine habit. Mayfield was taken into custody after deputies claimed to find 1.5 grams of meth residue on a plastic bag in a gun safe.

Authorities later found $100,000 worth of stolen goods on a little-used area of Mayfield's property. Among the recovered items were heavy machinery that had been reported stolen from two businesses in neighboring Lincoln County in late 2010 and early 2011, as well as audiovisual equipment that was later reported stolen from the then-defunct Red Bull Racing Team in nearby Mooresville in February 2011.

The informant whose statement led to the original search, died with his passenger in 2012 in a motorcycle crash while evading police pursuit in the jurisdiction of a different law enforcement agency.

Almost all the charges were eventually dropped or thrown out, with Mayfield pleading to two counts of misdemeanor possession of stolen property and one count possession of drug paraphernalia in 2014.

== In popular media ==
Mayfield is featured in the video for "Drowning (Face Down)" by the band Saving Abel. He was also featured in Alan Jackson's 1997 music video "Who's Cheatin' Who". And, in 2004, Mayfield participated in a Family Feud NASCAR special, hosted by then-host Richard Karn. In the special, Mayfield and his Evernham team faced off against Kevin Harvick on behalf of both drivers' foundations, with Mayfield and his team winning the game.

== Motorsports career results ==
=== NASCAR ===
(key) (Bold – Pole position awarded by qualifying time. Italics – Pole position earned by points standings or practice time. * – Most laps led.)

==== Sprint Cup Series ====
NASCAR Sprint Cup Series results
Year	Team	No.	Make	1	2	3	4	5	6	7	8	9	10	11	12	13	14	15	16	17	18	19	20	21	22	23	24	25	26	27	28	29	30	31	32	33	34	35	36	NSCC	Pts	Ref
1993	Sadler Brothers Racing	95	Ford	DAY	CAR	RCH	ATL	DAR	BRI	NWS	MAR	TAL	SON	CLT	DOV	POC	MCH	DAY; DNQ	NHA	POC	TAL	GLN	MCH; DNQ	BRI	DAR	RCH	DOV	MAR	NWS	CLT; 29	CAR	PHO	ATL; DNQ							74th	76	
1994	Sadler Brothers Racing	95	Ford	DAY; 30	CAR; DNQ	RCH; 27	ATL; DNQ	DAR	BRI; DNQ	NWS; 30	MAR	TAL; 37	SON																											37th	1673	
1994	Taylor Racing	02	Ford											CLT; 21	DOV	POC	MCH; 25	DAY; 30	NHA; 26																					37th	1673	
1994	Cale Yarborough Motorsports	98	Ford																	POC; 21	TAL; 32	IND; 26	GLN; DNQ	MCH; 23	BRI; 21	DAR; 33	RCH; 37	DOV; 24	MAR; DNQ	NWS; 27	CLT; 20	CAR; 19	PHO; 20	ATL; DNQ						37th	1673	
1995	Cale Yarborough Motorsports	98	Ford	DAY; 35	CAR; 18	RCH; 17	ATL; 36	DAR; 31	BRI; DNQ	NWS; DNQ	MAR; 16	TAL; 14	SON; DNQ	CLT; 22	DOV; 17	POC; 25	MCH; 22	DAY; 32	NHA; 26	POC; 8	TAL; 13	IND; 29	GLN; 25	MCH; 12	BRI; 30	DAR; 30	RCH; 23	DOV; 19	MAR; 16	NWS; DNQ	CLT; 29	CAR; 11	PHO; 20	ATL; 18						31st	2637	
1996	Cale Yarborough Motorsports	98	Ford	DAY; 19	CAR; 19	RCH; 28	ATL; 5	DAR; 18	BRI; 21	NWS; 20	MAR; 4	TAL; 32	SON; 32	CLT; 41	DOV; 12	POC; 15	MCH; 30	DAY; 27	NHA; 36	POC; 12	**TAL**; 16	IND; 25	GLN; 22	MCH; 20	BRI; 17	DAR; 37														26th	2721	
1996	Kranefuss-Haas Racing	37	Ford																								RCH; 29	DOV; 15	MAR; 34	NWS; 28	CLT; 43	CAR; 34	PHO; 44	ATL; DNQ						26th	2721	
1997	Kranefuss-Haas Racing	37	Ford	DAY; 6	CAR; 16	RCH; 17	ATL; 37	DAR; 17	TEX; 32	BRI; 9	MAR; 7	SON; 27	TAL; 23	CLT; 28	DOV; 4	POC; 5	MCH; 12	CAL; 12	DAY; 13	NHA; 17	POC; 9	IND; 5	GLN; 15	MCH; 33	BRI; 30	DAR; 16	RCH; 10	NHA; 25	DOV; 23	MAR; 18	CLT; 27	TAL; 26	CAR; 15	PHO; 19	ATL; 19					13th	3547	
1998	Penske-Kranefuss Racing	12	Ford	DAY; 3	CAR; 14	LVS; 5	ATL; 3	DAR; 4	BRI; 12	**TEX**; 23*	MAR; 7	TAL; 13	CAL; 2	CLT; 19	DOV; 5	RCH; 6	MCH; 5	POC; 1*	SON; 18	NHA; 30	POC; 18	IND; 42	GLN; 31	MCH; 7	BRI; 8	NHA; 20	DAR; 5	RCH; 22	DOV; 3	MAR; 23	CLT; 25	TAL; 5	DAY; 4	PHO; 42	CAR; 29	ATL; 15				7th	4157	
1999	Penske-Kranefuss Racing	12	Ford	DAY; 20	CAR; 5	LVS; 17	ATL; 36	DAR; 2	TEX; 5	BRI; 27	MAR; 41	TAL; 15	CAL; 7	RCH; 24	CLT; 10	DOV; 9	MCH; 17	POC; 9	SON; 7	DAY; 25	NHA; 28	POC; 35	IND; 29	GLN; 34	MCH; 18	BRI; 32	DAR; 3	RCH; 25	NHA; 36	DOV; 22	MAR; 15	CLT; 6	TAL; 16	CAR; 9	PHO; 41	HOM; 13	ATL; 3			11th	3743	
2000	Penske-Kranefuss Racing	12	Ford	DAY; 11	CAR; 7	LVS; 17	ATL; 28	DAR; 34	BRI; 4	TEX; 6	MAR; 7	**TAL**; 14	CAL; 1	RCH; 36	CLT; 6	DOV; 37	MCH; 41*	POC; 1	SON; 33	DAY; 43	NHA; 8	POC; 10	IND; INQ^{†}	GLN	MCH; 13	BRI; 35	**DAR**; 41*	RCH; 39	NHA; 40	**DOV**; 35	MAR; 38	CLT; 2	TAL; 42	**CAR**; 29*	PHO; 2	HOM; 2	ATL; 41			24th	3156	
2001	Penske Racing South	12	Ford	DAY; 9	CAR; 38	LVS; 42	ATL; 38	DAR; 3	BRI; 3	TEX; 22	MAR; 30	TAL; 35	CAL; 5	RCH; 36	CLT; 10	DOV; 34	MCH; 4	POC; 36	SON; 39	DAY; 17	CHI; 32	NHA; 39	POC; 18	IND; 18	GLN; 3	MCH; 13	BRI; 16	DAR; 13	RCH; 29	DOV; 42	KAN; 36	CLT	MAR	TAL	PHO	CAR	HOM	ATL	NHA	35th	2651	
2002	Evernham Motorsports	19	Dodge	DAY; 39	CAR; 29	LVS; 2	ATL; 23	DAR; 16	BRI; 14	TEX; 18	MAR; 11	TAL; 36	CAL; 38	RCH; 5	CLT; 39	DOV; 35	POC; 36	MCH; 36	SON; 28	DAY; 13	CHI; 34	NHA; 19	POC; 38	IND; 39	GLN; 15	MCH; 16	BRI; 25	DAR; 20	RCH; 10	NHA; 24	DOV; 20	KAN; 9	TAL; 20	CLT; 28	MAR; 28	ATL; 27	CAR; 21	PHO; 25	HOM; 33	26th	3309	
2003	Evernham Motorsports	19	Dodge	DAY; 8	CAR; 41	LVS; 21	ATL; 22	DAR; 30	BRI; 23	TEX; 25	**TAL**; 18	MAR; 40	CAL; 35	RCH; 25	CLT; 43	DOV; 21	POC; 15	MCH; 13	SON; 10	DAY; 8	CHI; 10	NHA; 34	POC; 38	IND; 41	GLN; 16	MCH; 28	BRI; 10	DAR; 6	RCH; 2	NHA; 11	DOV; 2	TAL; 38	KAN; 3	CLT; 12	MAR; 33	ATL; 7	PHO; 43	CAR; 3	HOM; 6	19th	3736	
2004	Evernham Motorsports	19	Dodge	DAY; 25	CAR; 11	LVS; 14	ATL; 2	DAR; 9	BRI; 17	TEX; 34	MAR; 36	TAL; 21	CAL; 14	RCH; 22	CLT; 8	**DOV**; 8	POC; 2	MCH; 19	SON; 30	DAY; 22	CHI; 5	NHA; 10	POC; 9	IND; 11	GLN; 7	MCH; 11	BRI; 22	CAL; 16	RCH; 1*	NHA; 35	**DOV**; 7	TAL; 38	KAN; 5*	CLT; 30	MAR; 6	ATL; 26	PHO; 21	DAR; 19	HOM; 35	10th	6000	
2005	Evernham Motorsports	19	Dodge	DAY; 23	CAL; 28	LVS; 20	ATL; 13	BRI; 17	MAR; 15	TEX; 11	PHO; 13	TAL; 4	DAR; 33	RCH; 13	CLT; 4	DOV; 14	POC; 14	MCH; 22	SON; 7	DAY; 12	CHI; 6	NHA; 19	POC; 18	IND; 4	GLN; 11	MCH; 1	BRI; 18	CAL; 26	RCH; 6	NHA; 16	DOV; 7	TAL; 14	KAN; 16	CLT; 11	MAR; 28	ATL; 38	TEX; 35	PHO; 24	HOM; 10	9th	6073	
2006	Evernham Motorsports	19	Dodge	DAY; 36	CAL; 22	LVS; 25	ATL; 41	BRI; 16	MAR; 26	TEX; 31	PHO; 26	TAL; 13	RCH; 32	DAR; 38	CLT; 15	DOV; 18	POC; 23	MCH; 36	SON; 22	DAY; 36	CHI; 24	NHA; 29	POC; 37	IND; 41	GLN	MCH	BRI	CAL	RCH	NHA	DOV	KAN	TAL	CLT	MAR	ATL	TEX			39th	1684	
2006	Phoenix Racing	09	Chevy																																			PHO; DNQ	HOM; 42	39th	1684	
2007	Bill Davis Racing	36	Toyota	DAY; DNQ	CAL; DNQ	LVS; DNQ	ATL; DNQ	BRI; 34	MAR; 40	TEX; DNQ	PHO; DNQ	TAL; 23	RCH; DNQ	DAR; DNQ	CLT; 25	DOV; 38	POC; DNQ	MCH; DNQ	SON	NHA; 40	DAY; DNQ	CHI; 26	IND; DNQ	POC; 31	GLN; 27	MCH; DNQ	BRI; 37	CAL; 36	RCH; DNQ	NHA; DNQ	DOV; DNQ	KAN; 22	TAL; DNQ	CLT; 39	MAR; DNQ					45th	1126	
2007	Haas CNC Racing	66	Chevy																																	ATL; 40	TEX; 22	PHO; 41	HOM; 26	45th	1126	
2008	Haas CNC Racing	70	Chevy	DAY; 23	CAL; 39	LVS; 16	ATL; 39	BRI; 30	MAR; 32	TEX; 38	PHO	TAL	RCH	DAR	CLT																									50th	578	
2008	Chip Ganassi Racing	40	Dodge													DOV; 25	POC	MCH	SON	NHA	DAY	CHI	IND	POC	GLN	MCH	BRI	CAL	RCH	NHA	DOV	KAN	TAL	CLT	MAR	ATL	TEX	PHO	HOM	50th	578	
2009	Mayfield Motorsports	41	Toyota	DAY; 40	CAL; 34	LVS; DNQ	ATL; DNQ	BRI; DNQ	MAR; 38	TEX; DNQ	PHO; DNQ	TAL; 32	RCH; 35	DAR; DNQ	CLT	DOV	POC	MCH	SON	NHA	DAY	CHI	IND	POC	GLN	MCH	BRI	ATL	RCH	NHA	DOV	KAN	CAL	CLT	MAR	TAL	TEX	PHO	HOM	54th	288	
^{†} - Qualified but replaced by Kyle Petty

===== Daytona 500 =====
Year	Team	Manufacturer	Start	Finish
1994	Sadler Brothers Racing	Ford	40	30
1995	Cale Yarborough Motorsports	Ford	29	35
1996	Cale Yarborough Motorsports	Ford	14	19
1997	Kranefuss-Haas Racing	Ford	21	6
1998	Kranefuss-Haas Racing	Ford	13	3
1999	Penske-Kranefuss Racing	Ford	6	20
2000	Penske-Kranefuss Racing	Ford	19	11
2001	Penske Racing South	Ford	38	9
2002	Evernham Motorsports	Dodge	28	39
2003	Evernham Motorsports	Dodge	20	8
2004	Evernham Motorsports	Dodge	22	25
2005	Evernham Motorsports	Dodge	24	23
2006	Evernham Motorsports	Dodge	26	36
2007	Bill Davis Racing	Toyota	DNQ	
2008	Haas CNC Racing	Chevrolet	33	23
2009	Mayfield Motorsports	Toyota	18	40

==== Busch Series ====
NASCAR Busch Series results
Year	Team	No.	Make	1	2	3	4	5	6	7	8	9	10	11	12	13	14	15	16	17	18	19	20	21	22	23	24	25	26	27	28	29	30	31	32	33	34	35	NBSC	Pts	Ref
1995	Bobby Jones Racing	50	Ford	DAY	CAR; 15	RCH	ATL; 42	NSV	DAR; 40	BRI	HCY	NHA; 19	NZH; 37	CLT; 12	DOV	MYB	GLN; 37	MLW	TAL; DNQ	SBO	IRP	MCH	BRI	DAR	RCH	DOV	CLT	CAR	HOM										50th	535	
1996	NorthStar Motorsports	98	Ford	DAY; 26	CAR; 30	RCH	ATL; 41	NSV; 9	DAR; 42	BRI	HCY	NZH	CLT; 34	DOV	SBO	MYB	GLN; 35	MLW	NHA	TAL; 13	IRP	MCH	BRI; 32	DAR	RCH; 7	DOV	CLT; 43	CAR; 35	HOM; 11										43rd	1051	
2003	Evernham Motorsports	79	Dodge	DAY	CAR	LVS	DAR	BRI	TEX	TAL	NSH	CAL	RCH	GTY	NZH	CLT	DOV	NSH	KEN	MLW	DAY	CHI	NHA	PPR	IRP	MCH	BRI	DAR	RCH	DOV	KAN	CLT	MEM	ATL	PHO	CAR; 4	HOM		99th	165	
2004	Tommy Baldwin Racing	6	Dodge	DAY	CAR	LVS	DAR	BRI	TEX	NSH	TAL	CAL; 18	GTY	RCH	NZH	CLT	DOV	NSH	KEN	MLW	DAY	CHI	NHA	PPR	IRP	MCH	BRI	CAL	RCH	DOV	KAN	CLT	MEM	ATL; QL^{†}	PHO	DAR	HOM		115th	109	
2005	Rusty Wallace Racing	64	Dodge	DAY; 21	CAL	MXC	LVS; 24			BRI; 6			TAL; 42			CLT; 38	DOV	NSH	KEN	MLW	DAY; 11	CHI; 39	NHA	PPR	GTY	IRP	GLN	MCH; 23	BRI	CAL; 27	RCH	DOV	KAN						46th	1151	
2005	Evernham Motorsports	6	Dodge					ATL; 22	NSH		TEX; 27	PHO		DAR; 8	RCH																								46th	1151	
2005	Evernham Motorsports	79	Dodge																															CLT; 29	MEM	TEX	PHO	HOM	46th	1151	
2006	Evernham Motorsports	9	Dodge	DAY	CAL; 35	MXC	LVS	ATL	BRI	TEX	NSH	PHO	TAL	RCH	DAR	CLT	DOV	NSH	KEN	MLW	DAY	CHI	NHA	MAR	GTY	IRP	GLN	MCH	BRI	CAL	RCH	DOV	KAN	CLT	MEM	TEX	PHO	HOM	131st	63	
^{†} - Qualified for Randy LaJoie

==== Craftsman Truck Series ====
NASCAR Craftsman Truck Series results
Year	Team	No.	Make	1	2	3	4	5	6	7	8	9	10	11	12	13	14	15	16	17	18	19	20	21	22	23	24	25	NCTC	Pts	Ref
2003	Green Light Racing	07	Dodge	DAY	DAR	MMR	MAR	CLT; 6	DOV	TEX	MEM	MLW	KAN	KEN	GTW	MCH	IRP	NSH	BRI	RCH	NHA	CAL	LVS	SBO	TEX	MAR	PHO	HOM	90th	155	
2006	Billy Ballew Motorsports	15	Chevy	DAY	CAL	ATL	MAR	GTY	CLT	MFD	DOV	TEX	MCH	MLW	KAN	KEN	MEM	IRP	NSH	BRI	NHA	LVS; 23	TAL	MAR	ATL; 31	TEX	PHO	HOM	65th	164	

=== ARCA Hooters SuperCar Series ===
(key) (Bold – Pole position awarded by qualifying time. Italics – Pole position earned by points standings or practice time. * – Most laps led.)

ARCA Hooters SuperCar Series results
Year	Team	No.	Make	1	2	3	4	5	6	7	8	9	10	11	12	13	14	15	16	17	18	19	20	21	ARSC	Pts	Ref
1992	Sadler Brothers Racing	95	Olds	DAY	FIF	TWS	TAL	TOL	KIL	POC	MCH	FRS	KIL	NSH	DEL	POC	HPT	FRS	ISF	TOL	DSF	TWS	SLM	ATL; 40	139th	-	
1993	Sadler Brothers Racing	95	Chevy	DAY; 4			TAL; 10	KIL; 2																	4th	4485	
1993	Sadler Brothers Racing	95	Olds		FIF; 3	TWS; 21						POC; 35	MCH; 5		POC; 25			**DSF**; 23							4th	4485	
1993	Sadler Brothers Racing	5	Olds						CMS; 5	FRS; 6	TOL; 14			FRS; 1		KIL; 3	ISF; 32		TOL; 16	SLM; 26	WIN; 3				4th	4485	
1993	Sadler Brothers Racing	95	Ford																			ATL; 16			4th	4485	
1995	Cale Yarborough Motorsports	86	Ford	DAY	ATL	TAL	FIF	KIL	FRS	MCH	I80	MCS	FRS	POC	POC	KIL	FRS	SBS	LVL	ISF	DSF	SLM	WIN	ATL; 25	116th	-	

=== CARS Late Model Stock Car Tour ===
(key) (Bold – Pole position awarded by qualifying time. Italics – Pole position earned by points standings or practice time. * – Most laps led. ** – All laps led.)

CARS Late Model Stock Car Tour results
Year	Team	No.	Make	1	2	3	4	5	6	7	8	9	10	11	12	13	14	15	16	CLMSCTC	Pts	Ref
2023	N/A	19	Ford	SNM	FLC	HCY	ACE	NWS	LGY	DOM	CRW; 30	HCY	ACE	TCM; 28	WKS	AAS	SBO	TCM	CRW	79th	8	

=== IHRA Late Model Sportsman Series ===
(key) (Bold – Pole position awarded by qualifying time. Italics – Pole position earned by points standings or practice time. * – Most laps led. ** – All laps led.)

IHRA Late Model Sportsman Series
Year	Team	No.	Make	1	2	3	ISCSS	Pts	Ref
2026	D2 Motorsports	19	Chevy	DUB	CDL; 19	AND; 27	20th	64	

== See also ==
- List of NASCAR Sprint All-Star Race drivers
- List of people from Kentucky
