= Reading Motorcycle Club =

Motorcycle club in the United States

- Abbreviation: RMC
- Founded: 1911
- Founder: John Hartman
- Founded at: American House Hotel, Oley Valley
- Region served: Pennsylvania, United States
- Members: 1,200
- Key people: Rich Keller
- Website: readingmc.com

Reading Motorcycle Club is a motorcycle club in Oley, Pennsylvania founded in 1911 and incorporated in 1914.

The RMC has the distinction of holding the fourth American Motorcycle Association (AMA) organization number. Each year since 1969, the RMC has hosted an annual Anniversary Party during the last full weekend in July, one of the largest gatherings by a motorcycle club on the East Coast of the United States.
