= Lavonia Speedway =

Motorsport track in the United States

- Location: 6165 Lavonia Hwy; Lavonia, Georgia; 30553
- Coordinates: 34.409884°N 83.038208°W
- Capacity: 2,500
- Owner: Taylor Griffith
- Broke ground: 1969
- Opened: September 12, 1971
- Architect: Henry Martin Ford
- Former names: Charlie's Raceway (1979); The New Lavonia Speedway (2013–2021)
- Major events: Current: Hunt the Front Super Dirt Series (2023, 2026-present); United Sprint Car Series (1997–present); Rusty Jordan Memorial (2021–present); Past: World of Outlaws Late Model Series (2014, 2018-2022)
- Website: www.lavoniaspeedway.com
- Surface: Dirt (1971-1989, 1996-present); Asphalt (1990-1995)
- Length: 0.375 mi (0.604 km)
- Turns: 4
- Race lap record: 14.990 (Zack Mitchell, 2022, Dirt Super Late Model)

Paved 3/8 Mile Oval (1990–1996)
- Surface: Asphalt
- Length: 0.375 mi (0.604 km)
- Turns: 4

Original 1/2 Mile Dirt Oval (1971–1990)
- Surface: Dirt
- Length: 0.500 mi (0.805 km)
- Turns: 4

Lavonia Speedway is a 0.375 mi (0.604 km) dirt oval short track in Lavonia, Georgia. The track primarily holds weekly events with some regional Dirt Super Late Model and 360 Sprint Car series stopping in throughout the year and has previously hosted events for the World of Outlaws Late Model Series. Lavonia is owned and operated by Taylor Griffith.

== Description ==
Lavonia is a 0.375 mi (0.604 km), semi-banked, dirt oval. The track has a seating capacity of 2,500.

== History ==
Zac Hill in a Modified Street at Lavonia in September 2023.

Opened on September 12, 1971, Lavonia was initially a 0.500 mi (0.805 km), semi-banked dirt track. In 1990, the track was paved and shortened to a 0.375 mi (0.604 km) and retained its original baking. Finally in 1996, the asphalt was torn out and reverted to a dirt oval.

The track closed in 2010 but was later brought back to competition after a few years away in 2013.

In 2026, the track drew its biggest attendance numbers in history when NASCAR Cup Series driver Carson Hocevar raced at the track.

== Weekly racing ==
Clay Thompson in a 602 Crate Dirt Late Model at Lavonia in April 2024.

Lavonia hosts 5 classes of weekly racing, including:

- 602 Crate Dirt Late Model
- Limited Dirt Late Model
- Modified Street
- Stock Car Challenge Series
- Stock 4

== Notable drivers ==
Notable drivers who competed at Lavonia on a regular basis include:

- Brandon 'Cornbread' Haley - Former ARCA Menards Series East driver and owner from 2010 to 2011.
- Jeremy Mayfield - Former NASCAR Cup Series driver and owner from 1993 to 2009
- Jack Pennington - NASCAR Winston Cup Series and NASCAR Busch Series driver from 1989 to 1990.
- Buck Simmons (1946–2012) - Dirt Super Late Model driver and former NASCAR Winston Cup Series driver from 1979 to 1980.
