= Todd Parrott =

American stock car racing crew chief

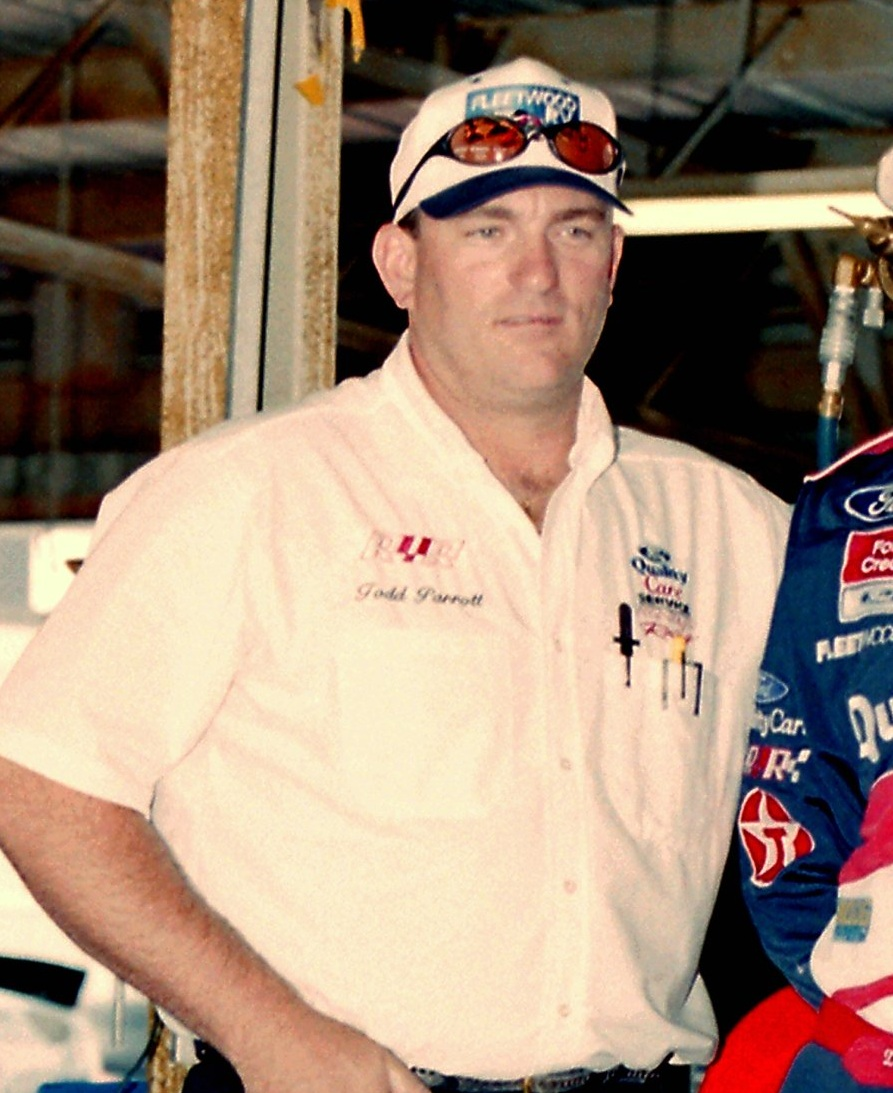
- Parrott in 1997

Personal information
- Born: Todd T. Parrott; February 9, 1964 (age 62) Charlotte, North Carolina, U.S.

Sport
- Country: United States
- Sport: ARCA Menards Series / ARCA Menards Series East
- Team: 67. Maples Motorsports

Todd T. Parrott (born February 9, 1964) is an American stock car racing crew chief who works for Maples Motorsports as the crew chief of their No. 67 car driven by Ryan Roulette part-time in the ARCA Menards Series. He is most well known for his long tenure as a NASCAR Cup Series crew chief at Robert Yates Racing crew chiefing Dale Jarrett's No. 88 Ford. The duo won 27 races together as well as the 1999 NASCAR Winston Cup Series championship.

Parrott also worked with Ernie Irvan, Elliott Sadler, and David Gilliland while at Yates. Over his career, Parrott has also worked for Petty Enterprises, Hall of Fame Racing (which was in a partnership with Yates), Roush Fenway Racing, Richard Petty Motorsports (the successor team to Petty Enterprises), Tommy Baldwin Racing, Richard Childress Racing, Circle Sport, Leavine Family Racing, and Premium Motorsports. Parrott won two races with Sadler in 2004, and his last two wins as a crew chief came with Marcos Ambrose at RPM in 2011 and 2012.

He last served as a crew chief in 2020 and at the time was one of the most successful active crew chief in the Cup Series with 31 career wins, behind Chad Knaus (81 wins) and Paul Wolfe (32).

== Career ==
=== Early Career: Working with Family ===
Parrott spent his early years working with his father Buddy, and brother Brad for DiGard Motorsports, and Curb Motorsports. Todd and Brad would then go to work for car owner and legendary drag racer Raymond Beadle and the Blue Max team under crew chief Barry Dodson. Both brothers were crew members on Rusty Wallace's 1989 NASCAR Winston Cup Series Championship team. Following the disbanding of the Blue Max team after the 1990 Winston Cup season the Parrott brothers would follow Wallace to the newly formed Penske Racing South, where Todd worked as a chassis specialist and tire manager, as well as a tire carrier during pit stops. Two thirds of the way through the 1992 season Todd and Brad would be reunited with their father Buddy, who was hired as Wallace's crew chief. Together they formed the core of the crew that won the 1993 Unocal Pit Crew Championship, and 19 races between 1992 and 1994. Buddy departed at the end of 1994, while Todd would remain at Penske until October 1995, with Brad following Todd to Yates soon after.

=== 1995–2005: Robert Yates Racing ===
Parrott's first crew chief position was working with Ernie Irvan in 1995 at Yates Racing on the new #88 Ford for two races. When the No. 88 went full time in 1996, Parrott became the crew chief for Dale Jarrett, winning the 1999 Cup Series championship. After 2002, Parrott worked for periods with several Yates drivers including Jarrett, Elliott Sadler, Travis Kvapil, and David Gilliland.

=== 2006: Petty Enterprises ===
In 2006, Parrott left RYR to crew chief the famous No. 43 Petty Enterprises Dodge, driven by Bobby Labonte, but returning to Yates during the season to work with rookie David Gilliland, who had just replaced Sadler in the No. 38 car.

=== 2006–2009: Second stint at Yates (including Hall of Fame Racing) ===
After Parrott returned to RYR, he and Gilliland won the pole for the Talladega race. The pair remained together for the entire 2007 season. However, for 2008, Parrott was moved to the other Yates car, the No. 28 (formerly No. 88), with Travis Kvapil. For 2009, Parrott was moved Hall of Fame Racing, a satellite team to Yates Racing which switched from Toyota to Ford that year after previously having an alliance with Joe Gibbs Racing. HOF would begin operating out the Yates shop in 2009. The driver was Bobby Labonte, who Parrott reunited with after previously working with him in 2006, but once again, the duo failed to make it through a full season, and Parrott was replaced on the No. 96 car by Ben Leslie during the season. Both Hall of Fame Racing and Yates Racing would close down after the 2009 season due to lack of sponsorship, with Yates equipment and owner points being inherited by Front Row Motorsports.

=== 2010–2013: Roush Fenway Racing and Richard Petty Motorsports ===
Parrott remained in the Ford family in 2010, initially working the speedway program in the Research and Development department of Roush Fenway Racing but quickly became Matt Kenseth's crew chief on the No. 17 after the 2010 Daytona 500, replacing Drew Blickensderfer, who was reassigned to Carl Edwards' No. 60 car in the Nationwide Series. Midway through the season, however, Parrott was released, and he joined Richard Petty Motorsports (which had an alliance with Roush at the time) starting at Chicagoland Speedway as crew chief for Elliott Sadler's No. 19. After RPM reduced from four cars to two for 2011, he moved to the No. 9 team and driver Marcos Ambrose. Two-thirds through the 2012 season, RPM's teams switched crew chiefs with Parrott going to the No. 43 of Aric Almirola, where he remained for 2013.

On October 17, 2013, it was announced that Parrott had been indefinitely suspended due to failing to meet NASCAR's substance abuse policy. He was released by Richard Petty Motorsports on October 21.

=== 2014–2017: Tommy Baldwin Racing, Richard Childress Racing, Circle Sport, Leavine Family Racing ===
On February 3, 2014, Parrott was named the crew chief of the No. 36 Chevrolet of Tommy Baldwin Racing, driven by Reed Sorenson. On December 13, 2014, it was announced that Parrott would be the Competition Director for Richard Childress Racing in the NASCAR Xfinity Series. Parrott was also named the crew chief on RCR's part-time No. 33 Cup Series car, working nine races for drivers Ty Dillon, Michael Annett, and Brian Scott. Parrott also substituted for Luke Lambert on the RCR No. 31 Cup car of Ryan Newman for six races, while Lambert served a suspension.

Parrott began 2016 working five races on the No. 95 Cup entry of Circle Sport – Leavine Family Racing, eventually being named full-time crew chief in October for drivers Ty Dillon and Michael McDowell. He continued in that position for most of 2017 as well.

=== 2018–2020: Premium Motorsports, B. J. McLeod Motorsports, Rick Ware Racing ===
In the 2018 season, Parrott moved to Premium Motorsports to crew chief their No. 55 car, where he reunited with Reed Sorenson. He also worked with Ross Chastain (on the No. 15 in one race), J. J. Yeley, Jeffrey Earnhardt, D. J. Kennington, and Jesse Little that year. The No. 55 also switched numbers to the No. 7 during the season after Premium started sharing owner points with NY Racing Team, who previously used the car number by themselves.

After not crew chiefing for any team in 2019, Parrott returned to the pit box in 2020 as the crew chief for B. J. McLeod Motorsports in that team's first season in the Cup Series. After working ten races with the team, Parrott finished out the season with Rick Ware Racing, crew chiefing for various drivers within the organization.

=== 2023–present: Fast Track Racing ===
In 2023, Parrott became a crew chief for ARCA team Fast Track Racing and he crew chiefed their No. 11 car driven by Zachary Tinkle full-time in the East Series and part-time in the main ARCA Series. He returned to crew chief Tinkle in that car in those series in 2024.

== Personal life ==
Parrott is the son of former Richard Petty crew chief Buddy Parrott and older brother of former Carl Edwards Xfinity crew chief Brad Parrott, who worked for Roush, Ganassi, and Rusty Wallace Racing, among other teams. Brad twice served brief stints as crew chief for Dale Jarrett in the Cup Series in 2003 and 2008.

== Crew chiefing record ==
All of Parrott's career as a crew chief has been in the NASCAR Cup Series, except for when he was also the crew chief of the Yates Racing No. 90 Busch Series car in 2005 for five races, four with Elliott Sadler and one with Dale Jarrett.

Year	#	Team
1995	#88	Robert Yates Racing (2 races)
1996–2002	#88	Robert Yates Racing (full-time)
2003	#38	Robert Yates Racing (13 races)
2004	#38	Robert Yates Racing (full-time)
2005	#38	Robert Yates Racing (27 races)
2005	#88	Robert Yates Racing (9 races)
2006	#43	Petty Enterprises (22 races)
2006	#38	Robert Yates Racing (13 races)
2007	#38	Robert Yates Racing (full-time)
2008	#28	Yates Racing (full-time)
2009	#96	Hall of Fame Racing (10 races)
2010	#17	Roush Fenway Racing (15 races)
2010	#19	Richard Petty Motorsports (18 races)
2011	#9	Richard Petty Motorsports (full-time)
2012	#9	Richard Petty Motorsports (26 races)
2012	#43	Richard Petty Motorsports (10 races)
2013	#43	Richard Petty Motorsports (31 races)
2014	#36	Tommy Baldwin Racing (full-time)
2015	#33	Richard Childress Racing (9 races)
2015	#31	Richard Childress Racing (6 races)
2016	#95	Circle Sport – Leavine Family Racing (12 races)
2017	#95	Leavine Family Racing (31 races)
2018	#15	Premium Motorsports (1 race)
2018	#55 / #7	Premium Motorsports (15 races)
2020	#78	B. J. McLeod Motorsports (10 races)
2020	#53 / #27	Rick Ware Racing (16 races)
2020	#51	Petty Ware Racing (3 races)
