= Big Diamond Speedway =

Motorsport venue in Pottsville, Pennsylvania

- Location: Pottsville, Pennsylvania
- Coordinates: 40.6847°N 76.3052°W
- Owner: Jake and Jasmine Smulley
- Opened: 1972
- Website: bigdspeedway.net

Oval
- Surface: Clay
- Length: .61 km (0.38 mi)
- Turns: 4
- Banking: High-banked

Big Diamond Speedway is a three-eighths-mile high-banked dirt oval raceway located in Pennsylvania's Coal Region.

== Overview ==
In 1972 Fritz Roehrig completed a surface mining job in Schuylkill County, Pennsylvania, then with partner Dom Muscara built a stock car racetrack and named it after the famous vein of coal they had just mined: "Big Diamond". Roehrig went on to operate the facility for 35 years before leasing the facility to Joe Kuperavage from 2006 to 2010. He then returned to the promoter role for one more year.

In 1992, Roehrig was awarded "Promoter of the Year" in the northeast by Racing Promotion Monthly. After 41 years, Rohrig sold the facility in 2012 to his son and daughter-in-law, Jake and Jasmine Smulley.

== Events ==
Weekly racing at Big Diamond is headlined by the small-block Modifieds along with support divisions which include RUSH Crate Sportsman, Crate 602 Sportsman, and Roadrunners. The facility hosts several touring series including the Super DIRTcar Series, USAC National Sprint Cars, URC Sprint Cars, East Coast Legend Series, Mid Atlantic Modifieds, Wingless Sportsman, and the PASS 305 Sprints.

The Coalcracker 72 for modifieds is presented annually, and has been won a record seven times by multi-time track champion Duane Howard.
