= Dirt track =

Dirt track may refer to:

- A kind of race track
- A dirt road
- A trail

== See also ==
- Dirt track racing
- Track racing
