= Oley, Pennsylvania =

Unincorporated community in Pennsylvania, US

- Census-designated place
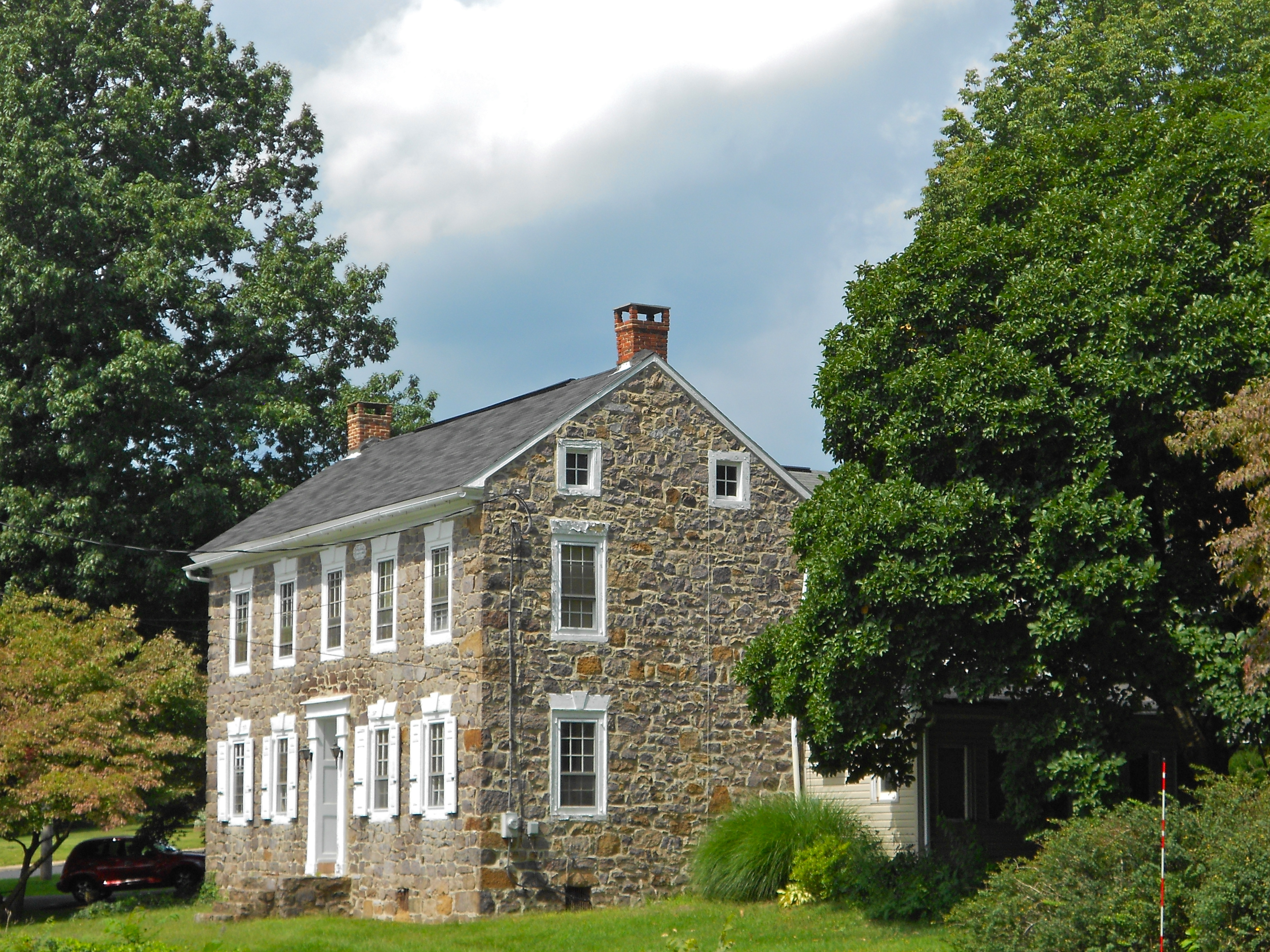
- The Milloth House

- Location within Pennsylvania Location within the United States
- Coordinates: 40°23′15″N 75°47′23″W
- Country: United States
- State: Pennsylvania
- County: Berks
- Township: Oley

Area
  - Total: 1.24 sq mi (3.22 km^{2})
  - Land: 1.23 sq mi (3.18 km^{2})
  - Water: 0.015 sq mi (0.04 km^{2})
- Elevation: 443 ft (135 m)

Population (2020)
  - Total: 1,244
  - Density: 1,013.5/sq mi (391.32/km^{2})
- Time zone: UTC-5 (Eastern (EST))
  - Summer (DST): UTC-4 (EDT)
- ZIP code: 19547
- Area codes: 610 and 484
- GNIS feature ID: 1198264

Oley, previously known as Friedensburg, is a census-designated place (CDP) that is located on Routes 73 and 662 in northern Oley Township, Berks County, United States.

The ZIP code is 19547.

== History ==
A post office named Oley Furnace was established in 1828 and renamed as Oley in 1836. The community took its name from Oley Township.

The entire township is listed on the National Register of Historic Places.

== Geography and other notable features ==
The Little Manatawny Creek flows southeastward through Oley into the Manatawny Creek, a tributary of the Schuylkill River.

The Berks Career and Technology Center has a campus in Oley that serves eastern Berks County. Oley Valley High School and the Reading Motorcycle Club are also located in Oley.

== Demographics ==
As of the 2010 census, the population was 1,282 residents. By 2020, it had declined modestly to 1,244.

== Notable people ==
- Daniel Boone, American pioneer, frontiersman, and folk hero
- Tommy Hinnershitz, sprint car racer
