= Eriez Speedway =

Dirt oval race track located in Erie, Pennsylvania

Coordinates: 42.051°N 79.970°W

Eriez Speedway located in Erie, Pennsylvania, United States is a 3/8 mile dirt oval race track. On July 22, 2007, Eriez Speedway held its first World of Outlaws Late Model Series event which was won by Josh Richards.

== See also ==
- Bedford Speedway
- Lake Erie Speedway, Erie County, south of North East, Pennsylvania
- Nazareth Speedway
- Pocono Raceway
