= Bechtelsville, Pennsylvania =

Borough in Pennsylvania, US

- Borough
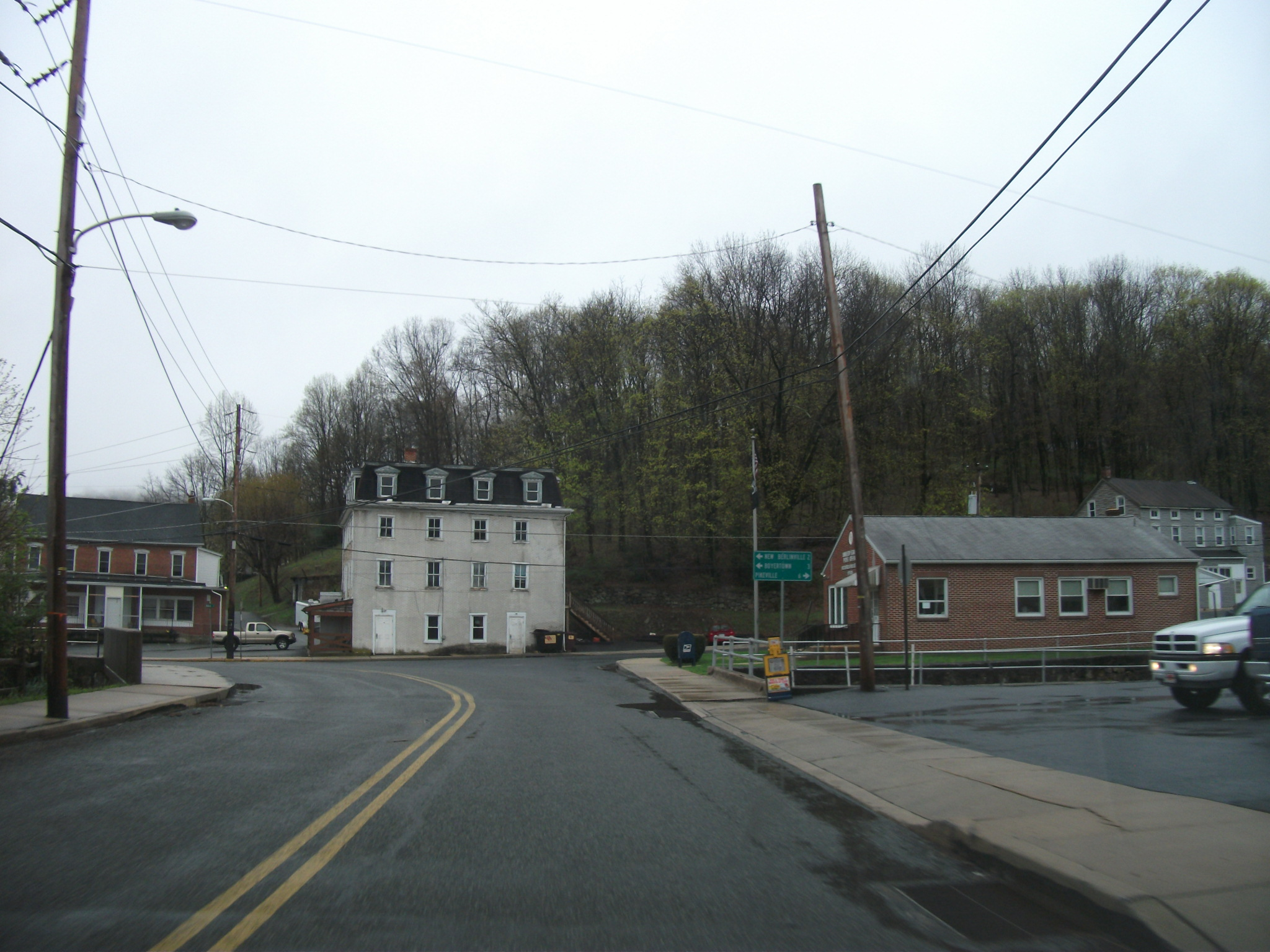
- Old Pennsylvania Route 100 in Bechtelsville

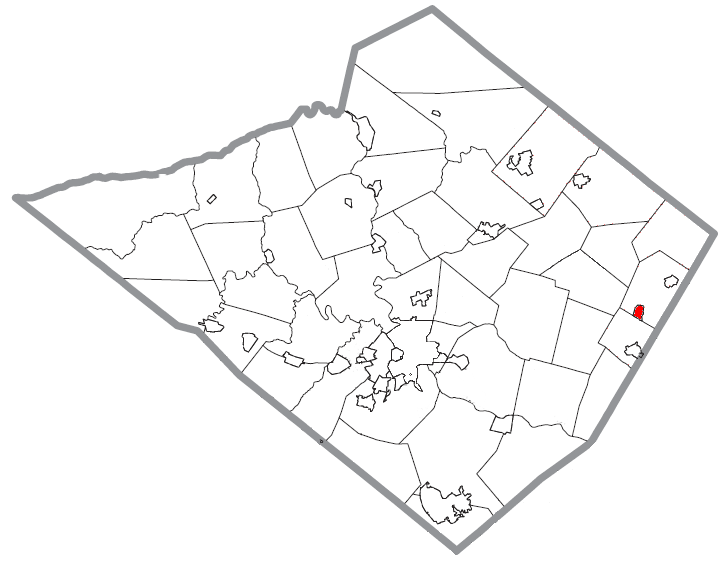
- Location of Bechtelsville in Berks County, Pennsylvania.

- Location of Bechtelsville in Pennsylvania Bechtelsville (the United States)
- Coordinates: 40°22′12″N 75°37′43″W
- Country: United States
- State: Pennsylvania
- County: Berks

Area
  - Total: 0.53 sq mi (1.37 km^{2})
  - Land: 0.53 sq mi (1.37 km^{2})
  - Water: 0.0039 sq mi (0.01 km^{2})
- Elevation: 404 ft (123 m)

Population (2020)
  - Total: 884
  - Density: 1,675.8/sq mi (647.03/km^{2})
- Time zone: UTC-5 (EST)
  - Summer (DST): UTC-4 (EDT)
- ZIP Code: 19505
- Area codes: 610 and 484
- FIPS code: 42-04896
- Website: https://www.bechtelsville.org/

Bechtelsville is a borough in Berks County, Pennsylvania, United States. The population was 884 at the 2020 census.

== Geography ==
Bechtelsville is located at 40°22′12″N 75°37′43″W (40.370078, −75.628590). According to the U.S. Census Bureau, the borough has a total area of 0.5 square miles (1.3 km^{2}), all land.

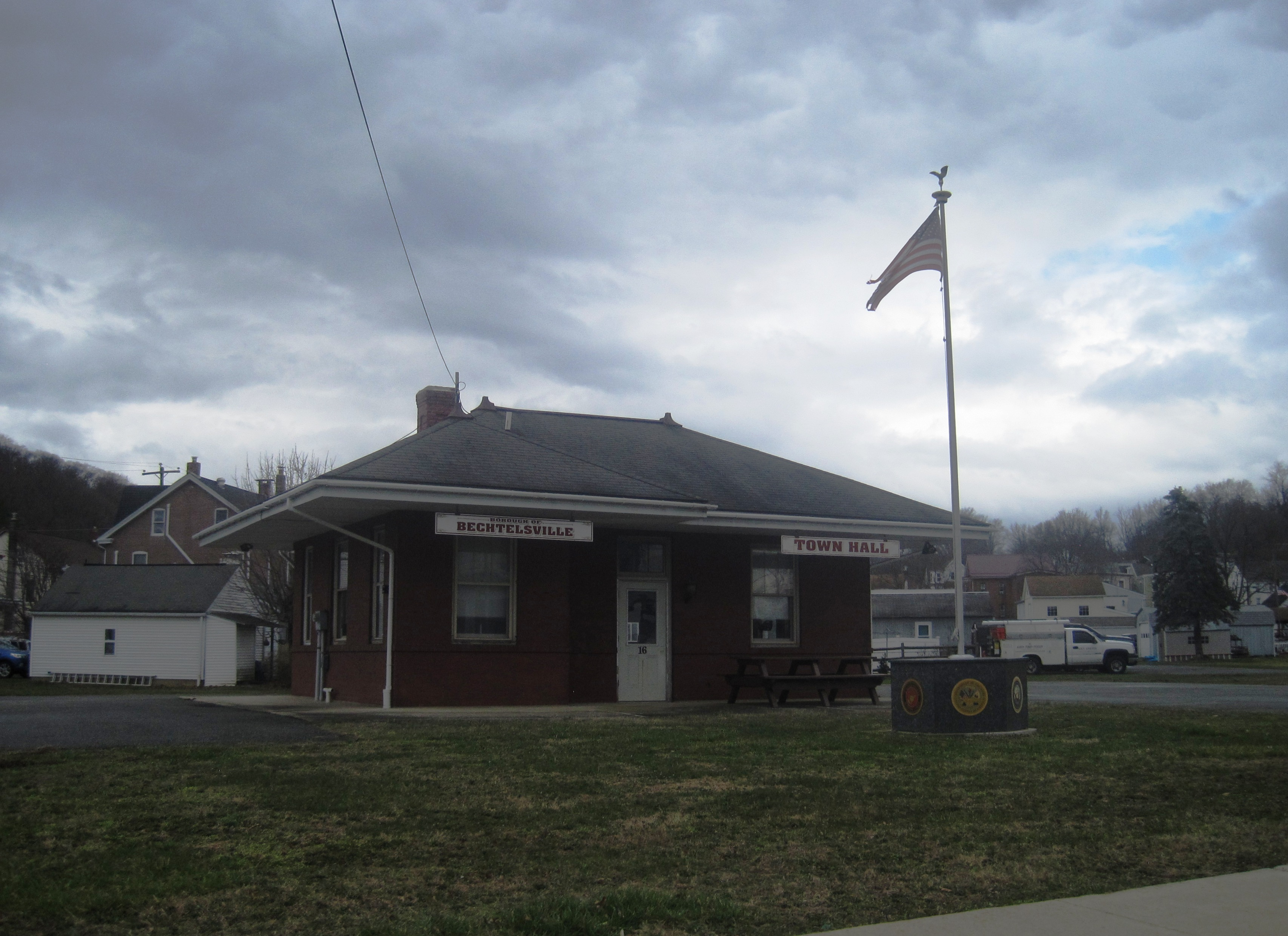
Bechtelsville Borough Hall

== Transportation ==
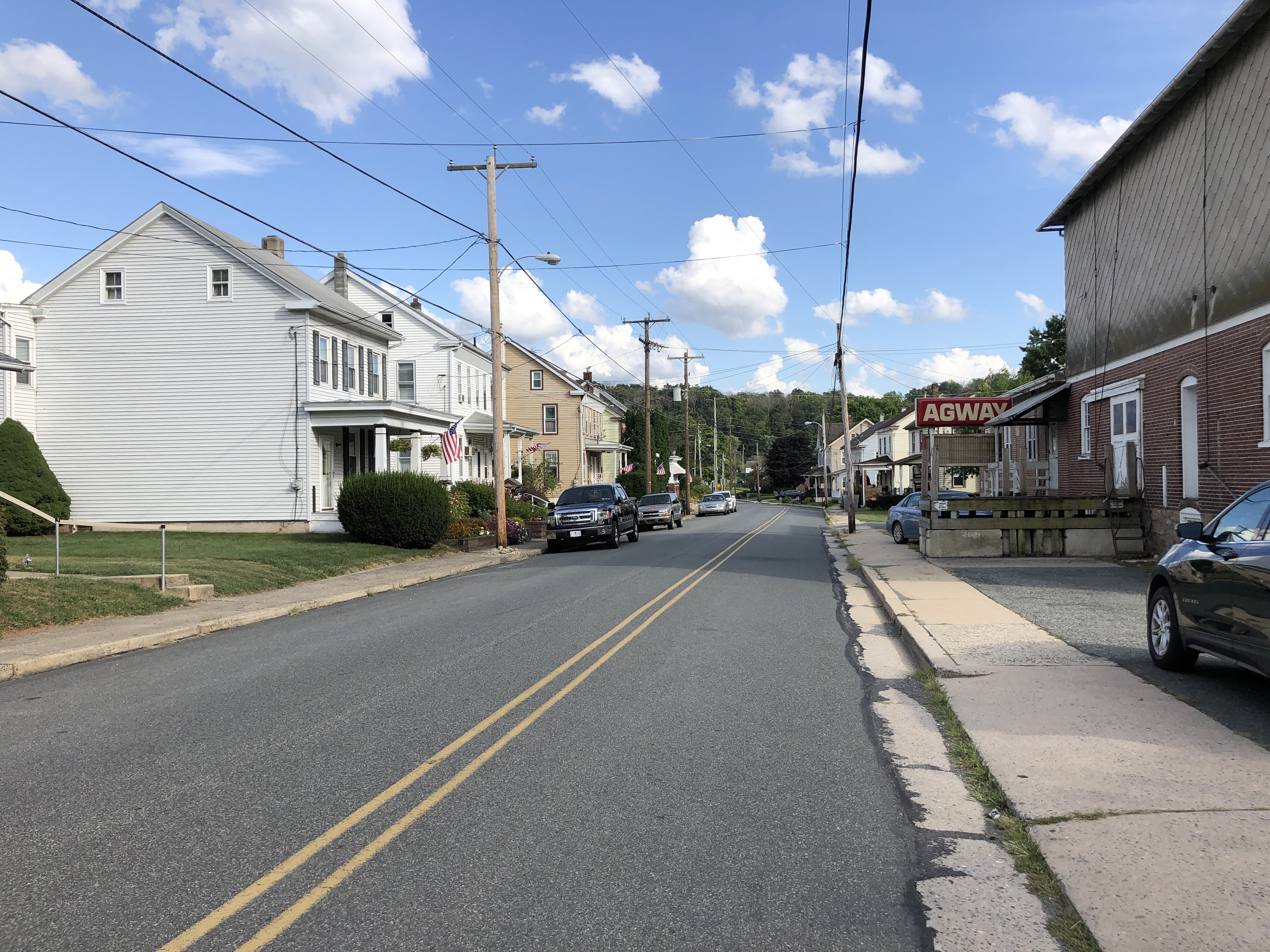
Chestnut Street in Bechtelsville

As of 2006, there were 4.06 miles (6.53 km) of public roads in Bechtelsville, of which 1.81 miles (2.91 km) were maintained by the Pennsylvania Department of Transportation (PennDOT) and 2.25 miles (3.62 km) were maintained by the borough.

No numbered highways pass directly through Bechtelsville. Main thoroughfares in the borough include Main Street, Chestnut Street, Race Street and Mill Street. The closest state highway is Pennsylvania Route 100, which passes a short distance southeast of the borough.

== Demographics ==
Historical population
Census	Pop.	Note	%±
1900	381		—
1910	417		9.4%
1920	502		20.4%
1930	549		9.4%
1940	587		6.9%
1950	603		2.7%
1960	625		3.6%
1970	728		16.5%
1980	832		14.3%
1990	864		3.8%
2000	931		7.8%
2010	942		1.2%
2020	884		−6.2%

At the 2010 census there were 942 people, 362 households, and 264 families living in the borough. The population density was 1,884 people per square mile (678.2 per km^{2}). There were 362 housing units at an average density of 224 per square mile (266.6 per km^{2}). The racial makeup of the borough was 98.3% White, 0.2% African American, 0.1% Asian, 0.1% from other races, and 1.2% from two or more races. Hispanic or Latino of any race were 1.3%.

There were 362 households, 31.2% had children under the age of 18 living with them, 65.5% were married couples living together, 12.4% had a female householder with no husband present, and 27.1% were non-families. 20.4% of households were made up of individuals, and 7.5% were one person aged 65 or older. The average household size was 3.60 and the average family size was 3.98.

The age distribution was 24.6% under the age of 20, 7.4% from 20 to 24, 27.4% from 25 to 44, 29.7% from 45 to 64, and 11.0% 65 or older. The median age was 39.6 years. For every 100 females there were 92.25 males. For every 100 females age 18 and over, there were 91.6 males.

While the following data has not yet been released from the 2010 Census, as of the 2000 Census, the median household income was in the borough was $88,846, and the median family income was $92,045. Males had a median income of $46,938 versus $33,828 for females. The per capita income for the borough was $19,627. About 0.2% of families and 0.3% of the population were below the poverty line, including 0.1% of those under age 18 and 0.3% of those age 65 or over.

== Public education ==
The borough is served by the Boyertown Area School District.
