= Production car racing =

Type of auto racing

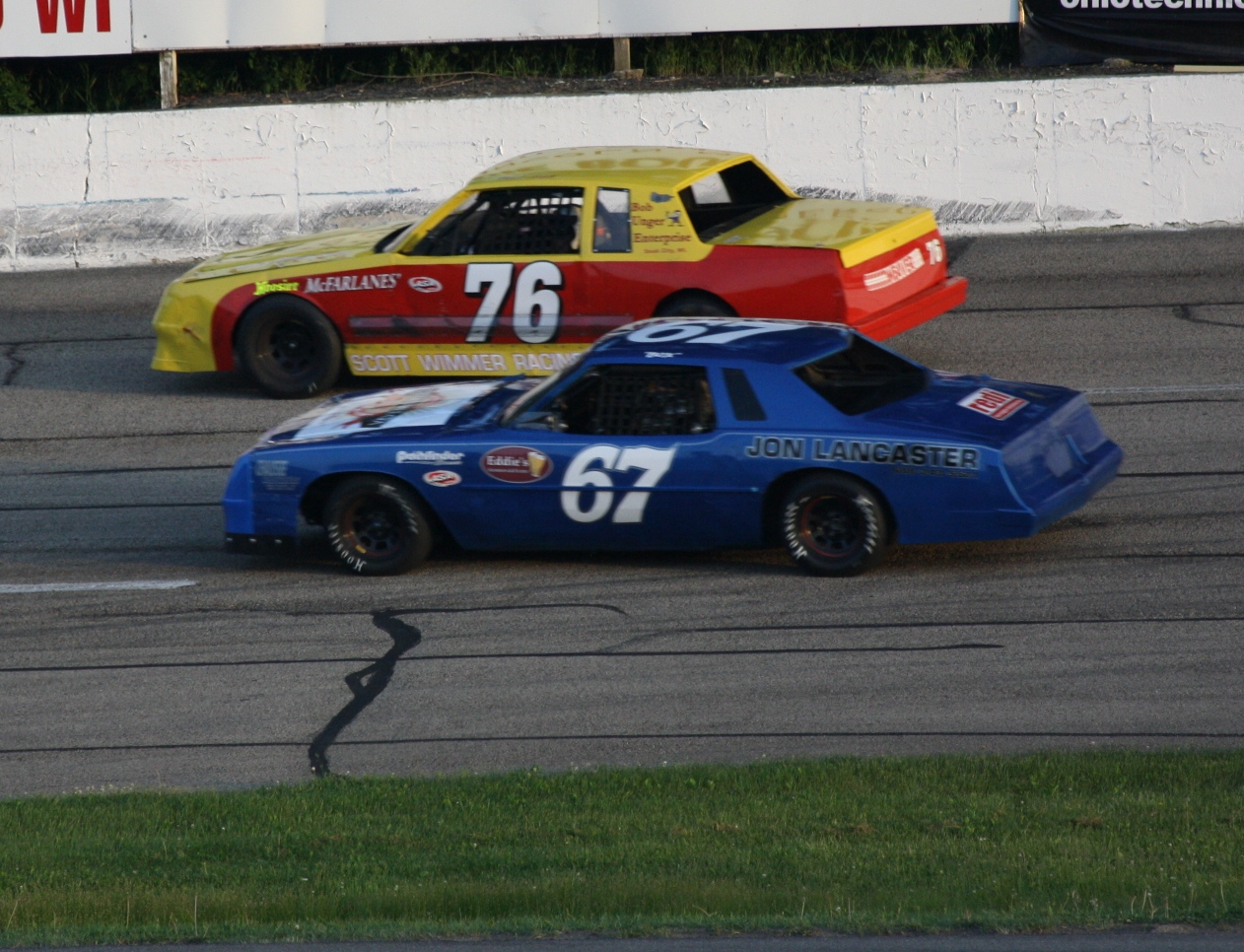
- Oval track Hobby Stocks
- Nicknames: Sport Compact, Factory Stock, Street Stock
- Sanctioning: Oval Road course Dragway: IMCA, DIRTcar, NASCAR, CRA; FIA, SCCA, IMSA, DMSB; NHRA, WDRA, IHRA

Characteristics
- Team members: Yes
- Mixed-sex: Yes
- Type: Outdoor

Production car racing, showroom stock racing, street stock, pure stock, touring and U-car racing are all categories of auto racing where unmodified (or very lightly modified) production cars race each other, outright and also in classes.

== Oval track racing ==
When the first oval speedway built for automobile racing was constructed in England in 1906, ordinary street cars were the vehicles of choice for racing. These cars were typically procured directly from dealerships, with minimal alterations made to meet the demands of the racetrack. The affordability and accessibility of stock cars allowed racing enthusiasts from all walks of life to participate, contributing to the growth and popularity of the sport.

As the sport evolved, so did the modifications made to the stock cars. Drivers started customizing their vehicles by enhancing performance and safety features, such as reinforcing chassis frames, installing roll cages, and improving engines and suspension systems. These modifications allowed the stock cars to withstand the intense demands of racing, turning them into formidable competitive machines.

These modifications increased the cost to compete, and in order to attract new competitors, race promotors responded by adding new divisions for "lesser modified" passenger cars. Requirements for these introductory divisions can vary greatly, but all are based on a full-bodied passenger vehicle and an original equipment manufacturer (OEM) production engine. Roll cages must be welded into the frame, and all glass, vinyl, upholstery and lights must be removed from the vehicle.

In various regions, they may be known as hobby stocks, street stocks, pure stocks, bombers, factory stocks or stingers. In British oval racing, the term "production car racing" has been used as an alternative for hot rods, as run in the West Country during the late 1960s to the mid-1970s, and a production car world championships. The West Country production cars were later reclassified as hot rods to come in line with the country's other promoters although this causes some confusion with the history of the West country racing as there was another class called hot rods that ran on those tracks.

The major U.S. sanctioning organizations – International Motor Contest Association (IMCA), DIRTcar, NASCAR, Wissota Promoters Association (WISSOTA), Race of Champions (RoC), and Championship Racing Association (CRA/ASA) – generally promote these classes as one of three levels: entry, intermediate, or advanced.

=== Entry-level ===
The Sport Compact (IMCA, DIRTcar) or Pure Stock (NASCAR) or Hornets (WISSOTA) or Dash (RoC) or Mini-Stock or Bomber divisions are the lowest entry-level racing class. Four-passenger vehicles with a four-cylinder or limited six-cylinder engines, the rules for these race cars mandate a stock body and a stock suspension. The vehicles can be made race ready for $500 to $2,000, and involve merely gutting the interior and adding a racing seat and roll cage.

=== Intermediate ===
The Hobby Stock (IMCA) or Factory Stock (DIRTcar) or Thunder Car (NASCAR) or Pure Stock (WISSOTA) or Street Stock (RoC, WISSOTA) are also divisions designed to give new competitors the chance to go racing. The body and frame must match, and very few alterations are allowed to the stock frame and suspension. The engines produce roughly 300 horsepower and must reflect the correct pairing to the model. Racers can generally build competitive cars for between $3,500 and $10,000.

=== Advanced ===
The Stock (IMCA, DIRTcar Midwest) or Street Stock (NASCAR, CRA/ASA) or Super Stock (RoC, WISSOTA) or Pro Stock (DIRTcar Northeast) divisions characteristically have bigger engines that produce roughly 360 horsepower, yet still require an OEM passenger vehicle production block. The rules also allow for some changes to the suspension, including the addition of screw jacks. While a used race car can be purchased for around $6,500, competitive stock cars can cost upwards of $25,000.

== Touring car racing ==
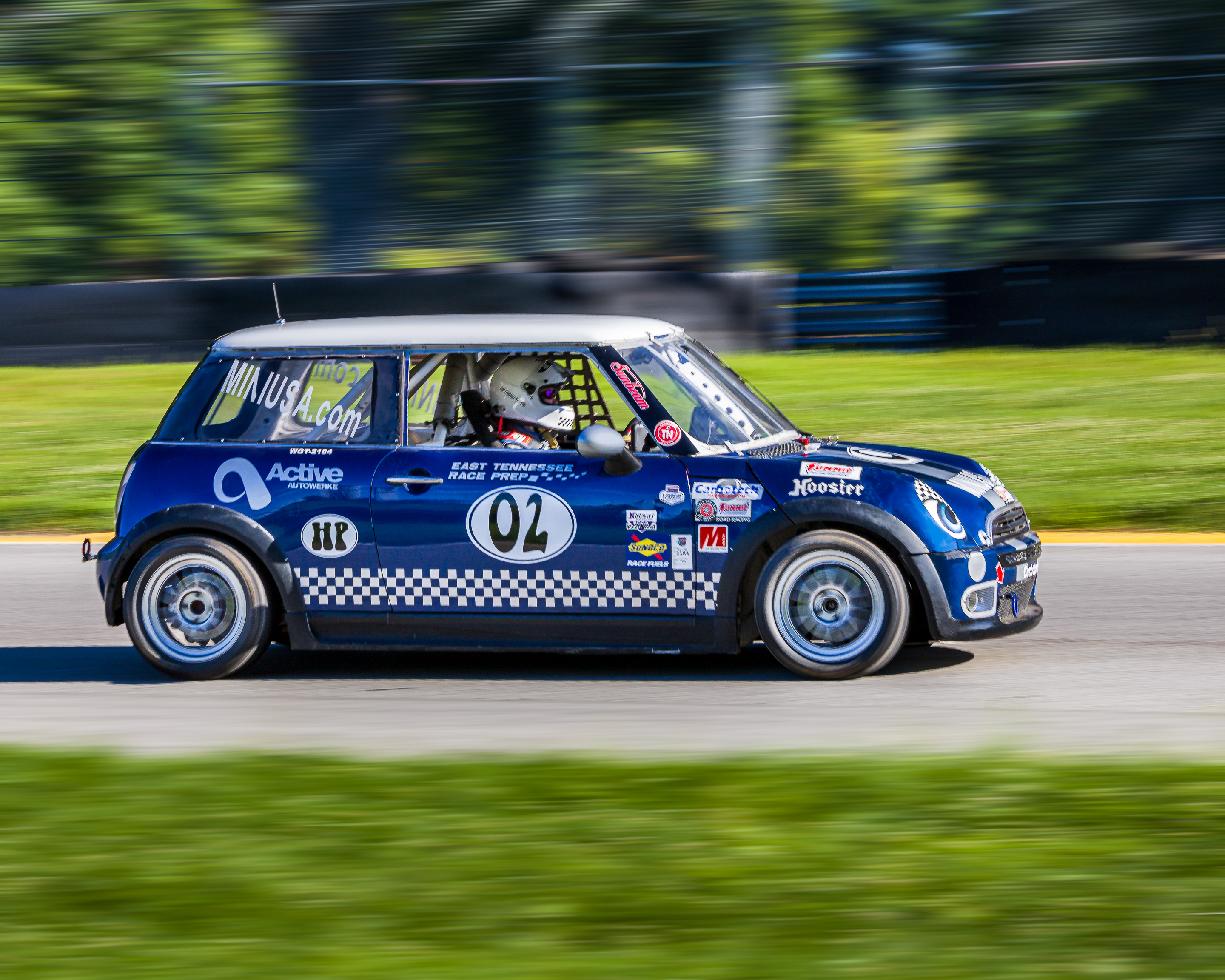
2004 Mini Cooper, H Production (Group 3)

Many production racing categories are based on particular makes of cars. There are many Porsche and Audi racing series around the world. These are also called "one make series". Some series use a handicapped start, where the smaller cars are released up to 45 seconds ahead of the larger cars, and are slowly caught, the idea being that all the cars are together at the finish of the race. Many series follow the group N regulation with a few exceptions. There are several different series that have run all over the world, most notably, Japan's Super Taikyu and IMSA's Firehawk Series which ran between the 1980s to 1990s all over the United States.

Cars usually have a protective roll cage and run race tires (either slicks or radials). Some freedoms are allowed, like gearbox coolers, giving the cars increased performance and components longevity. Production car racing, known in the US as "showroom stock", is an economical and rules restricted version of touring car racing.

Major races include the Bathurst 6 Hour, Bahrain 24 Hour, Dubai 24 Hour and Malaysian 12 Hour and sanctioned by organisations such as the FIA and SCCA. Normally using an entry-level formula, it has grown into a stand-alone series, with national, state and club events and championships. The first NASCAR "strictly stock" race was held at Charlotte Speedway, on June 19, 1949. Where a racing class requires that the cars raced be production vehicles only slightly adapted for racing, manufacturers typically produce a limited run of such vehicles for public sale so that they can legitimately race them in the class. These cars are commonly called "homologation specials".

== Drag racing ==
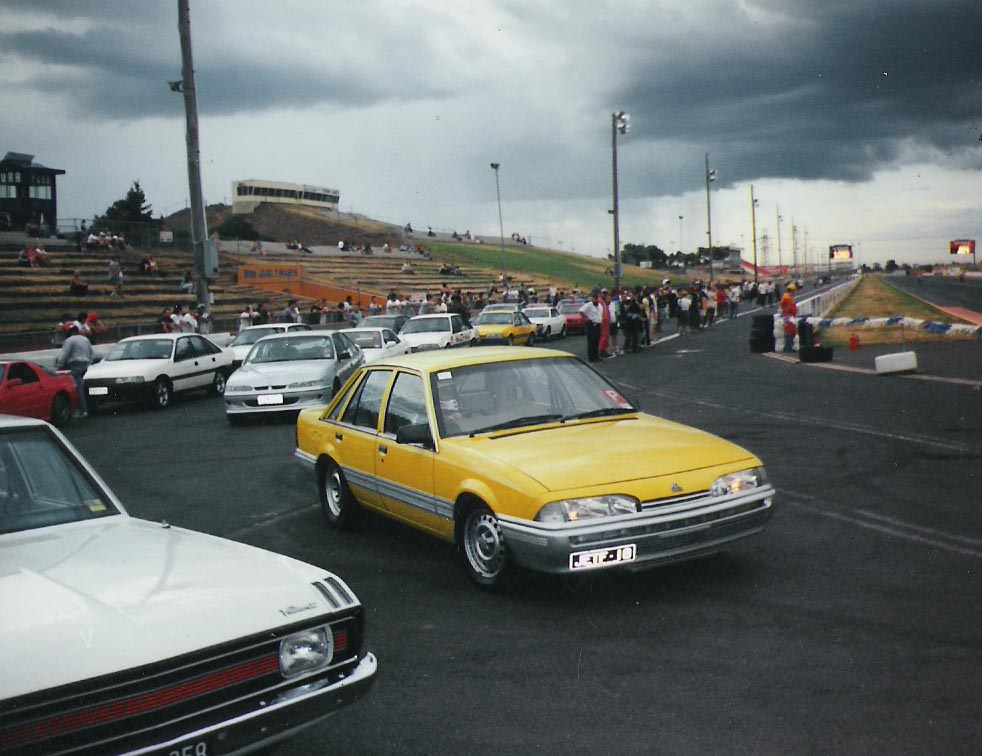
Off Street drag racing night at Calder Park, AU

The National Hot Rod Association (NHRA) promotes a "Stock " class in the U.S. and Canada where virtually any car is eligible to compete, and entries are classified using a system that divides factory shipping weight by a horsepower factor. Bodies must be unaltered and retain a full factory interior. Engines must be correct for the make and model vehicle and must retain stock cylinder heads, intake manifold, and carburetor. The NHRA has developed a Stock Car Classification Guide to position a vehicle in its proper class.

The International Hot Rod Association (IHRA) has included a "Sportsman" class which is open to door cars only. Electronics, pneumatics, hydraulics, throttle timers, staging controllers and counters prohibited, as are or any other device which may way affect the throttle operation. In Australia, the IHRA promotes a "Real Street" class, which requires the vehicles be legally registered and licensed.

The IHRA has also acquired the World Drag Alliances (WDRA), which operated in the U.S., Canada, and Aruba and provided a "Factory Street" class for factory produced vehicles to race legally and safely on a drag strip. The regulations for Factory Street vehicles rely on the manufacturers unaltered standard safety features of the vehicle to. All the vehicle's original and unaltered OEM safety equipment is mandatory and must be fully functional.

Every September at Mid-Michigan Raceway in Stanton, hosts the Pure Stock Muscle Car Drag Race. The event hosts classic drag racing with stock (or nearly stock) U.S. muscle cars factory built between 1955 and 1979.
