= Jim Boyd (racing driver) =

American racing driver (1920–2006)

- Born: James Oliver Boyd; March 31, 1920; Klamath Falls, Oregon, U.S.
- Died: October 22, 2006 (aged 86); Redding, California, U.S.

NASCAR Cup Series career
- 2 races run over 1 year
- Best finish: 70th (1975)
- First race: 1975 Tuborg 400 (Riverside)
- Last race: 1975 Los Angeles Times 500 (Ontario)
Wins	Top tens	Poles
0	0	0

ARCA Menards Series West career
- 39 races run over 3 years
- Best finish: 6th (1975)
- First race: 1974 Stockton 100 (Stockton)
- Last race: 1976 Winston Shasta 100 (Shasta)
- First win: 1974 Chula Vista 100 (Chula Vista)
Wins	Top tens	Poles
1	30	1
- Statistics up to date as of October 27, 2026.

James Oliver "Pappy" Boyd (March 31, 1920 – October 22, 2006) was an American professional stock car racing driver. He competed in the NASCAR Winston Cup Series and NASCAR Winston West Series in the 1970s.

== Racing career ==
Boyd drove racecars in Anderson and Chico. He began competing in the NASCAR Winston West Series in 1974, running 23 of the season's 28 races, scoring seventeen top-tens and his lone career win at South Bay Park Speedway. He finished seventh in the standings.

Boyd ran fifteen of eighteen Winston West races in 1975, scoring his lone career pole at Clovis Speedway and twelve top-ten finishes with a best finish of second at Craig Road Speedway. He finished sixth in the standings. In running a majority of the West Series scheduled, Boyd made two NASCAR Winston Cup Series starts in combination races, finishing 14th at Riverside International Raceway and 27th at Ontario Motor Speedway due to engine issues.

Boyd made one final Winston West start in 1976, finishing seventh in a race at Shasta Speedway.

== Personal life ==
Boyd was married to Alice Evelyn Boyd and the couple had multiple children. Boyd served in the United States Army in World War II. He owned Boyd Trucking Co., which appeared as a sponsor on his car in many of his Winston West starts.

== Motorsport career results ==
=== NASCAR ===
(key) (Bold – Pole position awarded by qualifying time. Italics – Pole position earned by points standings or practice time. * – Most laps led.)

==== Winston Cup Series ====
NASCAR Winston Cup Series results
Year	Team	No.	Make	1	2	3	4	5	6	7	8	9	10	11	12	13	14	15	16	17	18	19	20	21	22	23	24	25	26	27	28	29	30	NWCSC	Pts	Ref
1975	Boyd Racing	31	Dodge	RSD	DAY	RCH	CAR	BRI	ATL	NWS	DAR	MAR	TAL	NSV	DOV	CLT	RSD; 14	MCH	DAY	NSV	POC	TAL	MCH	DAR	DOV	NWS	MAR	CLT	RCH	CAR	BRI	ATL	ONT; 27	70th	203	

==== Winston West Series ====
NASCAR Winston West Series results
Year	Team	No.	Make	1	2	3	4	5	6	7	8	9	10	11	12	13	14	15	16	17	18	19	20	21	22	23	24	25	26	27	28	NWWSC	Pts	Ref
1974	Boyd Racing	31	Dodge	RSD	AMP	S99; 7	MSP; 7	COR; 6	SBP; 1*	ASP; 2	RSD	WER; 12	WSP; 10	SPS; 7	STA; 8	USP; 4	POR; 18	MED; 2	EUG; 7	CBS; 4	CAJ; 9	CRS; 5	ASP; 3	AMP; 9		EVG; 25	YAK; 19	POR; 22	SGB	ASP; 6	ONT	7th	1595.25	
1974	Boyd Racing	24	Dodge																						CSP; 18							7th	1595.25	
1975	Boyd Racing	31	Dodge	RSD	LAG	MSP; 4	ASP; 7	RSD; 14	ASP	USP; 4	POR; 10	EVG; 6	SMS; 4	CRS; 2	**CSP**; 5	ASP; 2	EVG; 23	YAK; 4	POR; 7	MSP; 4	ONT; 27											6th	998.5	
1976	Boyd Racing	31	Dodge	RSD	RSD	EVG	WSP	USP	POR	SHA; 7	SGS	EVG	YAK	POR	LAG	ONT																NA	68.25	
