= West Series races at Yakima =

NASCAR Winston West Series races at Yakima Speedway

NASCAR Winston West races at Yakima
NASCAR Winston West Series
- Venue: Yakima Speedway
- Location: Yakima, Washington, United States
- First race: 1964
- Last race: 1994
- Distance: 50 mi (80.467 km) (1968–1970, 1973–1979); 63 mi (101.389 km) (1972); 75 mi (120.701 km) (1967, 1971–1972, 1983–1985); 100 mi (160.934 km) (1964, 1994)
- Laps: 100 (1968–1970, 1973–1979); 125 (1972); 150 (1967, 1971–1972, 1983–1985); 200 (1964, 1994)
- Previous names: First races No name (1964, 1968–1970); Yakima 150 (1967, 1971); Yakima 500 (1972); Yakima 100 (1973–1975); Winston Yakima 100 (1976–1978); Valley Ford 100 (1979); Yakima Winston 150 (1983–1984); Sunfair Chevy / Lynch Olds 150 (1985); Hahn Motor Company 200 (1994); Second races No name (1969); Yakima 125 (1972); Yakima Winston 100 (1978)
- Most wins (driver): Jack McCoy (5)
- Most wins (team): Ernie Conn (5)
- Most wins (manufacturer): Dodge (7)

Circuit information
- Surface: Asphalt
- Length: 0.500 mi (0.805 km)
- Turns: 4

The NASCAR Winston West Series, now the ARCA Menards Series West, held several races at Yakima Speedway in Yakima, Washington. The track hosted the series twice in one season three times. Races at the track varied from 50 miles to 100 miles in length.

== Past winners ==
| Year | Date | No. | Driver | Team | Manufacturer | Race distance | | Race time | Average speed (mph) | Report | Ref |
| Year | Date | No. | Driver | Team | Manufacturer | Laps | Miles (km) | Race time | Average speed (mph) | Report | Ref |
|---|---|---|---|---|---|---|---|---|---|---|---|
| 1964 | April 26 | 9N | Bill Amick | Dick Niles | Mercury | 200 | 100 (160.934) | | | Report | |
| 1965 - 1966 | Not held | | | | | | | | | | |
| 1967 | July 29 | 77 | Hershel McGriff | Ted Pollock | Dodge | 150 | 75 (120.701) | | | Report | |
| 1968 | August 31 | 06 | Dave James | Jim Whitehead | Plymouth | 100 | 50 (80.467) | 0:48:51 | 61.412 | Report | |
| 1969 | July 6 | 7 | Jack McCoy | Ernie Conn | Dodge (2) | 100 | 50 (80.467) | 0:49:10 | 61.017 | Report | |
| 1969 | August 31 | 7 | Jack McCoy (2) | Ernie Conn (2) | Dodge (3) | 100 | 50 (80.467) | | | Report | |
| 1970 | July 2 | 7 | Jack McCoy (3) | Ernie Conn (3) | Dodge (4) | 100 | 50 (80.467) | 0:46:32 | 64.470 | Report | |
| 1971 | September 11 | 96 | Ray Elder | Elder Racing | Dodge (5) | 150 | 75 (120.701) | 1:00:14 | 74.709 | Report | |
| 1972 | May 27 | 04 | Hershel McGriff (2) | Beryl Jackson | Plymouth (2) | 150 | 75 (120.701) | 1:20:00 | 56.250 | Report | |
| 1972 | September 9 | 7 | Jack McCoy (4) | Ernie Conn (4) | Dodge (6) | 125 | 62.5 (100.584) | 1:00:22 | 62.120 | Report | |
| 1973 | September 8 | 7 | Jack McCoy (5) | Ernie Conn (5) | Dodge (7) | 100 | 50 (80.467) | 0:42:17 | 70.949 | Report | |
| 1974 | September 7 | 97 | Harry Jefferson | Jefferson Racing | Ford | 100 | 50 (80.467) | 0:50:00 | 60.000 | Report | |
| 1975 | September 6 | 38 | Jimmy Insolo | Roger Paquette | Chevrolet | 100 | 50 (80.467) | 0:59.56 | 50.055 | Report | |
| 1976 | September 11 | 95 | Harry Jefferson (2) | Jefferson Racing (2) | Ford (2) | 100 | 50 (80.467) | 0:47.11 | 63.581 | Report | |
| 1977 | June 25 | 95 | Harry Jefferson (3) | Jefferson Racing (3) | Mercury (2) | 100 | 50 (80.467) | 0:37:00 | 81.081 | Report | |
| 1978 | June 24 | 01 | Jimmy Insolo (2) | Gerald Craker | Pontiac | 100 | 50 (80.467) | 0:38:12 | 78.534 | Report | |
| 1978 | September 2 | 01 | Jimmy Insolo (3) | Gerald Craker | Pontiac (2) | 100 | 50 (80.467) | 0:39:50 | 75.313 | Report | |
| 1979 | June 30 | 7 | Ron Eaton | Eaton Racing | Pontiac (3) | 100 | 50 (80.467) | 0:42:21 | 70.835 | Report | |
| 1980 - 1982 | Not held | | | | | | | | | | |
| 1983 | July 2 | 7 | Ron Eaton (2) | Eaton Racing (2) | Buick | 150 | 75 (120.701) | 1:09:33 | 63.702 | Report | |
| 1984 | June 30 | 7 | Ron Eaton (3) | Eaton Racing (3) | Buick (2) | 150 | 75 (120.701) | 1:07:28 | 66.700 | Report | |
| 1985 | July 13 | 04 | Hershel McGriff (3) | Gary Smith | Pontiac (4) | 150 | 75 (120.701) | 1:00:56 | 73.851 | Report | |
| 1986 - 1993 | Not held | | | | | | | | | | |
| 1994 | June 11 | 50 | Mike Chase | JTC Racing | Chevrolet (2) | 200 | 100 (160.934) | 1:42:37 | 58.570 | Report | |

=== Manufacturer wins ===
| # Wins | Make | Years won |
|---|---|---|
| 7 | (United States) Dodge | 1967, 1969, 1970, 1971, 1972, 1973 |
| 4 | (United States) Pontiac | 1978, 1979, 1985 |
| 2 | (United States) Buick | 1983, 1984 |
| 2 | (United States) Chevrolet | 1975, 1994 |
| 2 | (United States) Ford | 1974, 1976 |
| 2 | (United States) Mercury | 1964, 1977 |
| 2 | (United States) Plymouth | 1968, 1972 |
