= 1988 NASCAR Winston West Series =

35th season of the NASCAR Winston West Series

Seasons
- ← 1987 1989 →

The 1988 NASCAR Winston West Series was the 35th season of the series. The title was won by Roy Smith, his fourth in the series and first since 1982.

== Teams and drivers ==
=== Complete schedule ===
| Manufacturer | Team | No. | Driver |
|---|---|---|---|
| Buick | Gautsche Racing | 82 | J. C. Danielsen |
| Buick | St. James Racing | 22 | St. James Davis |
| Chevrolet | Bown Racing | 1 | Jim Bown |
| Chevrolet | Sara Vincent | 41 | Jack Sellers 7 (Note: Sellers ran the full season split between Sara Vincent's No. 41 and Myunk Suk Lee's No. 45 entries.) |
| Chevrolet | Sara Vincent | 41 | Rick McCray 1 |
| Chevrolet | Schmitt Racing | 73 | Bill Schmitt |
| Ford | Razore Racing | 79 | Roy Smith |
| Ford | Stoke Racing | 19 | Chad Little |
| Oldsmobile | KC Racing | 33 | John Krebs |
| Oldsmobile | Oldsmobile Motorsports | 89 | Bob Howard |
| Oldsmobile | Oliver Racing | 2 | Scott Gaylord |
| Pontiac | McGriff Motorsports | 04 | Hershel McGriff |

=== Partial schedule ===
| Manufacturer | Team | No. | Driver | Races |
|---|---|---|---|---|
| Buick | Arrington Racing | 67 | Ron Esau | 1 |
| Buick | Eaton Racing | 7 | Ron Eaton | 2 |
| Buick | Gordy Oberg | 06 | Steve Hurley | 1 |
| Buick | Hylton Motorsports | 48 | Ron Esau | 2 |
| Buick | Spears Motorsports | 76 | Rusty Wallace | 1 |
| Buick | Tidrick Racing | 72 | Brad Tidrick | 3 |
| Buick | Unknown | 9 | Tom Fox | 1 |
| Buick | Unknown | 11 | Rick Catalano | 3 |
| Buick | Unknown | 54 | Pat Mintey | 4 |
| Buick | Unknown | 96 | Buddie Boys | 1 |
| Chevrolet | Kanke-Price Racing | 63 | Walt Price | 1 |
| Chevrolet | Kieper Racing | 98 | Derrike Cope | 3 |
| Chevrolet | Kieper Racing | 98 | Scott Miller | 1 |
| Chevrolet | Leonard Racing | 46 | Marta Leonard | 3 |
| Chevrolet | Myung Suk Lee | 45 | Jack Sellers | 1 |
| Chevrolet | Unknown | 08 | Robin Best | 1 |
| Chevrolet | Whalen-Goularte Racing | 17 | Harry Goularte | 5 |
| Ford | Jefferson Racing | 95 | Harry Jefferson | 1 |
| Ford | McKnight Racing | 83 | Sumner McKnight | 7 |
| Ford | Melling Racing | 9 | Bill Elliott | 3 |
| Ford | Stroppe Motorsports | 38 | Tobey Butler | 1 |
| Ford | Unknown | 07 | Mark Walbridge | 2 |
| Ford | Unknown | 9 | John Soares Jr. | 1 |
| Ford | Unknown | 88 | Bill Cooper | 1 |
| Ford | Unknown | 88 | Ardie Oji | 1 |
| Oldsmobile | Collins Motorsports | 28 | Gary Collins | 2 |
| Oldsmobile | Gordy Oberg | 0 | Gordy Oberg | 1 |
| Oldsmobile | Larry Gaylord | 68 | Larry Gaylord | 4 |
| Oldsmobile | Unknown | 78 | Ron Esau | 1 |
| Pontiac | Dave Phelps | 16 | Reno Fontana | 7 |
| Pontiac | Midgley Racing | 50 | George Follmer | 1 |
| Pontiac | Midgley Racing | 71 | Dave Marcis | 1 |
| Pontiac | Pontiac Motorsports | 74 | Ray Kelly | 5 |
| Pontiac | Unknown | 5 | Chuck Flora | 1 |
| Pontiac | Unknown | 64 | Garrett Evans | 1 |
| Pontiac | Unknown | 88 | Dirk Stephens | 1 |
| Buick 4 Chevrolet 1 | Gilliland Racing | 4 | Butch Gilliland | 5 |
| Chevrolet 4 Buick 3 | Spears Motorsports | 75 | Bill Sedgwick | 4 |
| Chevrolet 4 Buick 3 | Spears Motorsports | 75 | Tommy Kendall | 3 |
| Chevrolet 5 Buick 1 | Steurer Racing | 18 | Glen Steurer | 6 |
| Chevrolet 4 Ford 1 | John & Terry Petris | 12 | Terry Petris | 5 |
| Chevrolet 1 Pontiac 1 | McCray Racing | 08 | Rick McCray | 2 |
| Chevrolet 2 Oldsmobile 1 | Stoke Racing | 32 | Ruben Garcia | 3 |
| Oldsmobile 3 Pontiac 2 | Boys Racing | 69 | Trevor Boys | 5 |

== Schedule and results ==
The 1988 season included 8 individual races, although Mesa Marin Raceway hosted two races. The races at Riverside International Raceway and Phoenix International Raceway were in combination with the NASCAR Winston Cup Series.

| Date | Name | Racetrack | Location | Winner |
|---|---|---|---|---|
| April 24 | 7-Up 200 | Sears Point International Raceway | Sonoma, California | Bill Schmitt |
| May 21 | Kragen Auto Parts 200 | Mesa Marin Raceway | Bakersfield, California | Roy Smith |
| June 12 | Budweiser 400 | Riverside International Raceway | Riverside, California | Rusty Wallace |
| July 3 | Budweiser 300 | Spokane Grand Prix Course | Spokane, Washington | Roy Smith |
| July 10 | Winston 200 | Portland Speedway | Portland, Oregon | Derrike Cope |
| July 17 | Motorcraft 500 | Evergreen Speedway | Monroe, Washington | Chad Little |
| August 6 | American National Bank 200 | Mesa Marin Raceway | Bakersfield, California | Roy Smith |
| November 6 | Checker 500 | Phoenix International Raceway | Avondale, Arizona | Alan Kulwicki |

=== 7-Up 200 ===
The 7-Up 200 was held on April 24 at Sears Point International Raceway. Glen Steurer won the pole.

Top Ten Results

1. #73 - Bill Schmitt
2. #1 - Jim Bown
3. #79 - Roy Smith
4. #75 - Tommy Kendall
5. #18 - Glen Steurer
6. #83 - Sumner McKnight
7. #2 - Scott Gaylord
8. #88 - Bill Cooper
9. #98 - Scott Miller
10. #82 - J. C. Danielsen
- Bill Schmitt opened the season with a win, finishing five seconds ahead of Jim Bown in a race where twelve cars finished on the lead lap. Schmitt led the most laps in the race, 22 of 50.

=== Kragen Auto Parts 200 ===
The Kragen Auto Parts 200 was held on May 21 at Mesa Marin Raceway. Ron Esau won the pole.

Top Ten Results

1. #79 - Roy Smith
2. #19 - Chad Little -1
3. #17 - Harry Goularte -1
4. #82 - J. C. Danielsen -3
5. #18 - Glen Steurer -3
6. #04 - Hershel McGriff -4
7. #12 - Terry Petris -6
8. #2 - Scott Gaylord -7
9. #89 - Bob Howard -9
10. #41 - Jack Sellers -16
- Roy Smith led 106 of 200 laps and beat defending champion Chad Little by over a lap to score his first win of the season. He took the points lead from Bill Schmitt, leading by thirteen points at the end of the race after Schmitt suffered from overheating issues and finished sixteenth.

=== Budweiser 400 ===
The Budweiser 400 was held on June 12 at Riverside International Raceway and was the first of two combination races with the NASCAR Winston Cup Series. Ricky Rudd won the pole.

Top Ten Results

1. #27 - Rusty Wallace
2. #11 - Terry Labonte
3. #26 - Ricky Rudd
4. #3 - Dale Earnhardt
5. #55 - Phil Parsons
6. #43 - Richard Petty
7. #6 - Mark Martin
8. #29 - Dale Jarrett
9. #44 - Sterling Marlin
10. #75 - Neil Bonnett

Failed to qualify: #03 - Howard Mark, #10 - Ken Bouchard, #14 - Butch Gilliland, #16 - Reno Fontana, #20 - Scott Gaylord, #22 - St. James Davis, #41 - Jack Sellers, #45 - Billy Fulcher, #46 - Marta Leonard, #48 - Tony Spanos, #50 - George Follmer, #67 - Ron Esau, #74 - Ray Kelly, #81 - Glen Steurer, #82 - J. C. Danielsen, #85 - Sumner McKnight, #89 - Bob Howard, #97 - Rodney Combs

- Bobby Allison would finish in 22nd place, two laps down. This would be the final race he completed before suffering career-ending injuries at Pocono the following week.
- Rusty Wallace led the most laps, 43 of 95, and scored his first Winston Cup win of the season. Bill Schmitt in twelfth was the highest finishing West Series driver, closing his points gap to nine behind Roy Smith, who finished 27th overall, fourth among West Series competitors.

=== Budweiser 300 ===
The Budweiser 300 was held on July 3 at the Spokane Grand Prix Course. Chad Little won the pole.

Top Ten Results

1. #79 - Roy Smith
2. #73 - Bill Schmitt
3. #82 - J. C. Danielsen
4. #33 - John Krebs
5. #75 - Tommy Kendall -1
6. #72 - Brad Tidrick -3
7. #19 - Chad Little -4
8. #89 - Bob Howard -6
9. #83 - Sumner McKnight -18
10. #68 - Larry Gaylord -23
- Roy Smith led 55 of 100 laps to score his second win of the season in the second and final NASCAR race held on the streets of Spokane, extending his points lead to twenty over Bill Schmitt.

=== Winston 200 ===
The Winston 200 was held on July 10 at Portland Speedway. Bill Schmitt won the pole.

Top Ten Results

1. #98 - Derrike Cope
2. #04 - Hershel McGriff
3. #79 - Roy Smith
4. #75 - Bill Sedgwick -2
5. #73 - Bill Schmitt -3
6. #72 - Brad Tidrick -3
7. #89 - Bob Howard -6
8. #33 - John Krebs -6
9. #82 - J. C. Danielsen -6
10. #16 - Reno Fontana -17
- Although Hershel McGriff led over half of the race, Derrike Cope would secure the win by nearly 3.5 seconds over McGriff, which would ultimately be the final win for long-time team Kieper Racing. Roy Smith improved his points lead by just two, leaving Portland with a 22 point advantage over Bill Schmitt.

=== Motorcraft 500 ===
The Motorcraft 500 was held on July 17 at Evergreen Speedway. Bill Schmitt won the pole.

Top Ten Results

1. #19 - Chad Little
2. #69 - Trevor Boys -2
3. #79 - Roy Smith -3
4. #73 - Bill Schmitt -5
5. #83 - Sumner McKnight -6
6. #48 - Ron Esau -9
7. #17 - Harry Goularte -10
8. #1 - Jim Bown -10
9. #71 - Dave Marcis -11
10. #82 - J. C. Danielsen -12

Failed to qualify: #0 - Gordy Oberg, #06 - Steve Hurley

- Defending champion Chad Little scored his lone win of the season by over 2 laps after leading for 319 of the race's 500 laps. Roy Smith's points lead improved by just one over Bill Schmitt, increasing the gap to 23.

=== American National Bank 200 ===
The American National Bank 200 was held on August 6 at Mesa Marin Raceway. Chad Little won the pole.

Top Ten Results

1. #79 - Roy Smith
2. #73 - Bill Schmitt
3. #76 - Rusty Wallace
4. #04 - Hershel McGriff
5. #89 - Bob Howard
6. #83 - Sumner McKnight -1
7. #4 - Butch Gilliland -1
8. #33 - John Krebs -1
9. #82 - J. C. Danielsen -1
10. #19 - Chad Little
- In a competitive race which saw six different drivers, including 1988 Winston Cup race win leader Rusty Wallace, take turns leading, Roy Smith prevailed for his third and final win of the season, defeating championship rival Bill Schmitt by five seconds and extending his points lead to 34 heading into the finale.

=== Checker 500 ===
The Checker 500 was held on November 6 at Phoenix International Raceway and was the second of two combination races with the NASCAR Winston Cup Series. Geoffrey Bodine won the pole.

Top Ten Results

1. #7 - Alan Kulwicki
2. #11 - Terry Labonte
3. #28 - Davey Allison
4. #9 - Bill Elliott
5. #27 - Rusty Wallace
6. #5 - Geoffrey Bodine -1
7. #8 - Bobby Hillin Jr. -1
8. #90 - Benny Parsons -1
9. #55 - Phil Parsons -1
10. #44 - Sterling Marlin -1

Failed to qualify: #14 - Butch Gilliland, #20 - Scott Gaylord, #22 - St. James Davis, #41 - Jack Sellers, #66 - John Krebs, #82 - J. C. Danielsen, #89 - Bob Howard, #95 - Harry Jefferson

- This was Alan Kulwicki's first career Winston Cup Series win. After taking the checkered flag, Kulwicki turned the car clockwise around and completed what he eventually referred to as a "Polish victory lap." Kulwicki, himself a Polish American, wanted to be able to wave to the fans directly from his driver's side window.
- This was Benny Parsons' final career top-ten, finishing one spot ahead of younger brother Phil.
- Third-place Winston Cup points contender Dale Earnhardt was involved in an early crash with Joe Ruttman and lost a lap. Earnhardt would salvage an eleventh-place finish, but the incident, as well as both Bill Elliott and Rusty Wallace scoring top-fives, effectively ended Earnhardt's chances of a third consecutive Winston Cup title.
- Championship leader Bill Elliott finished one position ahead of Rusty Wallace, allowing him to maintain his 79-point lead going into the season finale in Atlanta.
- Ricky Rudd had a dominating run until overheating late in the race led to an engine failure. Rudd would finish 26th.
- Chad Little was the highest finishing Winston West driver in nineteenth. Points leader Roy Smith secured his fourth and final Winston West title after finishing 30th overall, third among West drivers. Bill Schmitt maintained second in the standings after finishing 37th overall, sixth among West drivers.

== Full Drivers' Championship ==
(key) Bold – Pole position awarded by time. Italics – Pole position set by owner's points. * – Most laps led. † – Ineligible for West Series points

| Pos | Driver | SON | MMR | RSD | SPO | POR | EVG | MMR | PHO | Pts |
|---|---|---|---|---|---|---|---|---|---|---|
| 1 | Roy Smith | 3 | 1* | 27 | 1* | 3 | 3 | 1 | 30 | 418 |
| 2 | Bill Schmitt | 1* | 16 | 12 | 2 | **5** | **4** | 2 | 37 | 381 |
| 3 | Chad Little | 13 | 2 | 23 | **7** | 13 | 1* | **10** | 19 | 368 |
| 4 | J.C. Danielsen | 10 | 4 | DNQ | 3 | 9 | 10 | 9 | DNQ | 329 |
| 5 | Hershel McGriff | 27 | 6 | 36 | 16 | 2* | 13 | 4 | 34 | 328 |
| 6 | Jim Bown | 2 | 17 | 41 | 13 | 15 | 8 | 18 | 42 | 318 |
| 7 | Bob Howard | 11 | 9 | DNQ | 8 | 7 | 15 | 5* | DNQ | 312 |
| 8 | Scott Gaylord | 7 | 8 | DNQ | 12 | 14 | 11 | 13 | DNQ | 309 |
| 9 | John Krebs | 26 | 20 | 25 | 4 | 8 | 27 | 8 | DNQ | 298 |
| 10 | Sumner McKnight | 6 | 23 | DNQ | 9 | 20 | 5 | 6 | | 271 |
| 11 | St. James Davis | 16 | 13 | DNQ | 18 | 19 | 20 | 19 | DNQ | 263 |
| 12 | Jack Sellers | 28 | 10 | DNQ | 11 | 12 | 19 | 25 | DNQ | 260 |
| 13 | Glen Steurer | **5** | 5 | DNQ | 14 | | 12 | 17 | | 237 |
| 14 | Reno Fontana | 18 | 14 | DNQ | 17 | 10 | 22 | 16 | | 237 |
| 15 | Trevor Boys | 21 | 25 | | | | 2 | 12 | 20 | 193 |
| 16 | Harry Goularte | 22 | 3 | | 15 | | 7 | 20 | | 188 |
| 17 | Ron Esau | 20 | **15** | DNQ | | | 6 | | | 183 |
| 18 | Terry Petris | 23 | 7 | 35 | | | 26 | 15 | | 178 |
| 19 | Butch Gilliland | | 22 | DNQ | | | 28 | 7 | DNQ | 156 |
| 20 | Tommy Kendall | 4 | | 18 | 5 | | | | | 142 |
| 21 | Larry Gaylord | | 26 | 10 | 11 | 17 | | | | 140 |
| 22 | Ray Kelly | 17 | 27 | DNQ | | | 24 | 23 | | 137 |
| 23 | Pat Mintey | 14 | 18 | | | | 14 | 22 | | 136 |
| 24 | Bill Sedgwick | | 19 | | | 4 | 30 | 24 | | 127 |
| 25 | Brad Tidrick | | | | 6 | 6 | 16 | | | 125 |
| 26 | Ruben Garcia | 12 | 11 | 39 | | | | | | 120 |
| 27 | Derrike Cope | | | 17† | | 1 | 25 | 21 | 16† | 116 |
| 28 | Rick Catalano | | | | | 18 | 18 | 14 | | 103 |
| 29 | Marta Leonard | 15 | 12 | DNQ | | | | | | 100 |
| 30 | Rick McCray | 24 | 24 | 37 | | | | | | 97 |
| 31 | Gary Collins | | | | | | | 11 | 33 | 87 |
| 32 | Mark Walbridge | | | | | 16 | 21 | | | 65 |
| 33 | Ron Eaton | | | | | 17 | 23 | | | 62 |
| 34 | Rusty Wallace | | | 1*† | | | | 3 | 5† | 48 |
| 35 | Bill Cooper | 8 | | | | | | | | 43 |
| 36 | Dave Marcis | | | 21† | | | 9 | | 18† | 42 |
| 37 | Scott Miller | 9 | | | | | | | | 42 |
| 38 | Harry Jefferson | | | | | | | | DNQ | 39 |
| 39 | George Follmer | | | DNQ | | | | | | 33 |
| 40 | Robin Best | 19 | | | | | | | | 32 |
| 41 | Walt Price | | 21 | | | | | | | 30 |
| 42 | John Soares Jr. | 25 | | | | | | | | 26 |
| 43 | Ardie Oji | | 28 | | | | | | | 23 |
| 44 | Bill Elliott | | | 16† | | | 29 | | 4† | 22 |
| | Tobey Butler | | | | 19 | | | | | |
| | Chuck Flora | | | | 20 | | | | | |
| | Dirk Stephens | | | | 21 | | | | | |
| | Garrett Evans | | | | 22 | | | | | |
| | Buddie Boys | | | | 23 | | | | | |
| | Tom Fox | | | | 24 | | | | | |
| | Gordy Oberg | | | | | | DNQ | | | |
| | Steve Hurley | | | | | | DNQ | | | |

== See also ==
- 1988 NASCAR Winston Cup Series
- 1988 NASCAR Busch Series
- 1988 NASCAR Busch Grand National North Series
