= 1975 Winston Western 500 =

Auto race held at Riverside International Raceway in 1975

Race details
- Race 1 of 30 in the 1975 NASCAR Winston Cup Series season
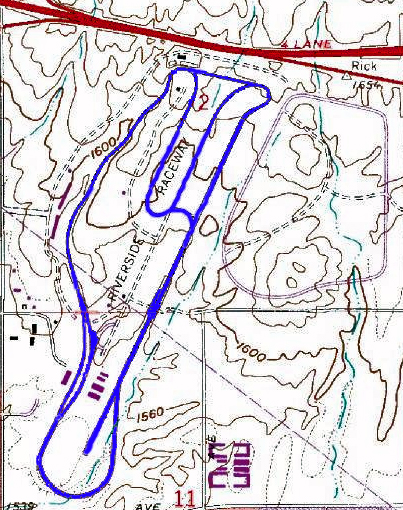
- Layout of Riverside International Raceway (1969-1988 version)
- Date: January 19, 1975
- Official name: Winston Western 500
- Location: Riverside International Raceway, Riverside, California
- Course: Permanent racing facility
- Course length: 2.700 miles (4.345 km)
- Distance: 191 laps, 500.4 mi (805.3 km)
- Weather: Warm with temperatures of 79 °F (26 °C); wind speeds of 10.9 miles per hour (17.5 km/h)
- Average speed: 98.627 miles per hour (158.725 km/h)

Pole position
Driver	Bobby Allison	Penske Racing South

Most laps led
Driver	Bobby Allison	Penske Racing South
- Laps: 173

Winner
No. 16	Bobby Allison	Penske Racing South

Television in the United States
- Network: TBS
- Announcers: Buddy Baker; Ken Squier

The 1975 Winston Western 500 was a NASCAR Winston Cup Series racing event that took place on January 19, 1975, at Riverside International Raceway in Riverside, California. A companion race known as the Permatex 200, in the Late Model Sportsmen Series, would be held one day prior to this event on the same track.

The 1975 NASCAR Winston Cup Series would jump start Richard Petty into a different breed of stock car driver; even though his 1975 Dodge Charger muscle car vehicle would be as comfortable to drive on the race track as a boxcar on the railroad tracks.

This was the first race that the vaunted Chevrolet Malibu Laguna S-3 was eligible for competition, although its use began in earnest at the 1975 Daytona 500.

== Race report ==
35 drivers managed to qualify for this 191-lap race that spanned a total distance of 500.4 miles or 805.3 kilometres. Fifty-five thousand people would attend a live racing event that would last for five hours and four minutes. Ivan Baldwin would become the last-place finisher due to engine problems on the fourth lap. Bobby Allison and David Pearson both chased each other for the lead lap before Allison would win by nearly 23 seconds over Pearson. Other drivers who had the lead at certain points in the race were Sonny Easley and Ray Elder. More than half the field failed to finish the race due to problems ranging from engine difficulties to oil-related problems and even the occasional transmission problem.

Only 13 cars were running at the end of the race; only Bobby Allison, David Pearson, Cecil Gordon, and Dave Marcis had a realistic shot of winning the race. Most of the teams were feeling their way through since it was the first race of the year and teams had to experiment with new strategies. The broadcasting range provided by the network was questionable at best despite being televised specifically for cable television. Most of the Northern United States (including New Jersey) were nearly oblivious to the events that occurred. The results were shown primarily through tape-delayed highlight shows and amateurish NASCAR magazines.

Speeds up to 110.382 miles per hour or 177.643 kilometres per hour were seen during solo qualifying runs while actual race speeds were merely 98.267 miles per hour or 158.145 kilometres per hour. Richard Petty would spend 19 laps on pit road while the crew repaired the left front of his car; using a lot of Arno 200 MPH tape in the process. The car looked like a candidate for the junkyard but Petty later roared around the track faster than eventual race winner Bobby Allison. Petty even passed Allison a few times in the process. Attrition was considered to be a considerable issue at the race as only 13 cars were running at; with only one other car within 7 laps of the lead, at a track bigger than Watkins Glen.

This would be the last NASCAR Winston Cup series race for G.T. Tallas. He'd return to NASCAR 20 years later to run two races in the NASCAR Truck Series.

While multi-car teams were becoming the norm, a significant amount of "lone wolf" owners still were operating in 1975.

Prize amounts earned for each driver ranged from $14,735 ($88,163.96 when adjusted for inflation) to $520 ($3,111.32 when adjusted for inflation); with a grand total of $97,075 being handed out by the official NASCAR treasurer ($580,829.08 when adjusted for inflation). Ron Esau, Don Puskarich, and Bill Schmitt would make their introductions to NASCAR in this race while Dick Bown would hang up his racing gloves after this event.

=== Qualifying ===
Grid	No.	Driver	Manufacturer
1	16	Bobby Allison	'75 AMC Matador
2	21	David Pearson	'73 Mercury
3	43	Richard Petty	'74 Dodge
4	72	Benny Parsons	'75 Chevrolet
5	03W	Chuck Bown	'74 Dodge
6	96W	Ray Elder	'74 Dodge
7	26W	Dick Bown	'75 Chevrolet
8	97W	Harry Jefferson	'72 Ford
9	38W	Jimmy Insolo	'74 Chevrolet
10	29W	Hershel McGriff	'72 Chevrolet
11	55W	Bill Osborne	'72 Ford
12	33W	Glenn Francis	'74 Chevrolet
13	78W	Hugh Pearson	'72 Chevrolet
14	7W	Ivan Baldwin	'74 Dodge
15	37W	Chuck Wahl	'74 Chevrolet

Failed to qualify: Dennis Wilson (#61W)

== Finishing order ==
Section reference:

1. Bobby Allison
2. David Pearson
3. Cecil Gordon
4. Dave Marcis
5. Elmo Langley
6. James Hylton
7. Richard Petty
8. Gary Matthews
9. Ed Negre
10. Hershel McGriff
11. Richard Childress
12. Don Puskarich
13. Ray Elder
14. J.D. McDuffie
15. Larry Esau
16. Bill Osborne
17. Chuck Wahl
18. Bill Schmitt
19. Richard White
20. Don Reynolds
21. Sonny Easley
22. Ron Esau
23. Hugh Pearson
24. Benny Parsons
25. Glenn Francis
26. Pete Torres
27. Chuck Bown
28. Chuck Little
29. G.T. Tallas
30. Dick Bown
31. Walter Ballard
32. Harry Jefferson
33. Jimmy Insolo
34. Carl Adams
35. Ivan Baldwin

== Timeline ==
Section reference:

- Start: Bobby Allison was leading the racing grid as the green flag was waved.
- Lap 5: Carl Adams noticed that his vehicle was leaking oil.
- Lap 13: Richard Petty took over the lead from Bobby Allison; oil pump issues took Jimmy Insolo out of the event.
- Lap 16: Bobby Allison took over the lead from Richard Petty.
- Lap 17: David Pearson took over the lead from Bobby Allison.
- Lap 18: Bobby Allison took over the lead from David Pearson.
- Lap 28: G.T. Tallas noticed that his vehicle was leaking oil.
- Lap 33: Caution due to Richard Petty's accident on turn 9, ended on lap 35.
- Lap 35: Sonny Easley took over the lead from Bobby Allison.
- Lap 36: Chuck Bown managed to ruin his vehicle's transmission.
- Lap 37: Ray Elder took over the lead from Sonny Easley.
- Lap 38: Bobby Allison took over the lead from Ray Elder.
- Lap 44: The rear end of Glenn Francis' vehicle came off in an unsafe manner; Benny Parson's vehicle suffered from oil pump issues.
- Lap 65: David Pearson took over the lead from Bobby Allison.
- Lap 66: Bobby Allison took over the lead from David Pearson.
- Lap 96: Ron Esau managed to ruin his vehicle's transmission.
- Lap 105: Caution due to oil spills on turns 1 and 8, ended on lap 111.
- Lap 138: David Pearson took over the lead from Bobby Allison.
- Lap 139: Bobby Allison took over the lead from David Pearson.
- Lap 145: Ray Elder managed to render his vehicle's engine non-operable.
- Lap 147: Caution due to Bill Osbourne's problematic engine, ended on lap 153.
- Lap 155: David Pearson took over the lead from Bobby Allison.
- Lap 163: Bobby Allison took over the lead from David Pearson.
- Lap 166: Hershel McGriff noticed that his oil pump was not functioning properly.
- Finish: Bobby Allison was officially declared the winner of the event.

== Standings after the race ==
Pos	Driver	Points	Differential
1	Bobby Allison	185	0
2	David Pearson	175	-10
3	Cecil Gordon	165	-20
4	Dave Marcis	160	-25
5	Elmo Langley	155	-30
6	Richard Petty	151	-34
7	James Hylton	150	-35
8	Gary Matthews	142	-43
9	Ed Negre	138	-47
10	Hershel McGriff	134	-51

Preceded by 1974 Los Angeles Times 500	NASCAR Winston Cup Series Season; 1974-5	Succeeded by 1975 Daytona 500

Preceded by 1974	Winston Western 500 races 1975	Succeeded by 1976
