= 1988 Checker 500 =

28th race of the 1988 NASCAR Winston Cup Series

Race details
- Race 28 of 29 in the 1988 NASCAR Winston Cup Series
- The 1988 Checker 500 program cover, featuring Terry Labonte.
- Date: November 6, 1988
- Official name: Inaugural Checker 500
- Location: Avondale, Arizona, Phoenix International Raceway
- Course: Permanent racing facility
- Course length: 1 miles (1.6 km)
- Distance: 312 laps, 312 mi (502.115 km)
- Scheduled distance: 312 laps, 312 mi (502.115 km)
- Average speed: 90.457 miles per hour (145.576 km/h)
- Attendance: 60,000

Pole position
Driver	Geoff Bodine	Hendrick Motorsports
- Time: 29.220

Most laps led
Driver	Ricky Rudd	King Racing
- Laps: 183

Winner
No. 7	Alan Kulwicki	AK Racing

Television in the United States
- Network: ESPN
- Announcers: Bob Jenkins, Ned Jarrett

Radio in the United States
- Radio: Motor Racing Network

The 1988 Checker 500 was the 28th and penultimate stock car race of the 1988 NASCAR Winston Cup Series season, the eighth and final race of the 1988 NASCAR Winston West Series, and the inaugural iteration of the event. The race was held on Sunday, November 6, 1988, before an audience of 60,000 in Avondale, Arizona at Phoenix International Raceway, a 1-mile (1.6 km) permanent low-banked tri-oval race track. The race took the scheduled 312 laps to complete.

In the closing laps of the race, owner-driver Alan Kulwicki took advantage of a misfortunate Ricky Rudd, who suffered an engine failure after being the dominant driver of the race. Passing Rudd for the lead with 16 laps left in the race, Kulwicki was able to defend a large gap to take his first career NASCAR Winston Cup Series victory and his only victory of the season. To fill out the top three, Junior Johnson & Associates' Terry Labonte and Ranier-Lundy Racing's Davey Allison finished second and third, respectively.

In the driver's championship battle for the NASCAR Winston Cup Series, championship leader Bill Elliott maintained a 79-point lead over second-place driver Rusty Wallace heading into the final race of the season, the 1988 Atlanta Journal 500. In order for Elliott to guarantee the title victory in the final race, he needed to finish 18th or better in the race.

In the driver's championship for the NASCAR Winston West Series, Razore Racing's Roy Smith won the championship over runner-up Bill Schmitt.

== Background ==
The layout of Phoenix International Raceway, the venue where the race was held.

Phoenix International Raceway – also known as PIR – is a one-mile, low-banked tri-oval race track located in Avondale, Arizona. It is named after the nearby metropolitan area of Phoenix. The motorsport track opened in 1964 and currently hosts two NASCAR race weekends annually. PIR has also hosted the IndyCar Series, CART, USAC and the Rolex Sports Car Series. The raceway is currently owned and operated by International Speedway Corporation.

The raceway was originally constructed with a 2.5 mi (4.0 km) road course that ran both inside and outside of the main tri-oval. In 1991 the track was reconfigured with the current 1.51 mi (2.43 km) interior layout. PIR has an estimated grandstand seating capacity of around 67,000. Lights were installed around the track in 2004 following the addition of a second annual NASCAR race weekend.

=== Entry list ===
- (R) denotes rookie driver.

#	Driver	Team	Make	Sponsor
1	Jim Bown	Bown Racing	Chevrolet	Rose Auto Wrecking
2	Ernie Irvan (R)	U.S. Racing	Chevrolet	Kroger
3	Dale Earnhardt	Richard Childress Racing	Chevrolet	GM Goodwrench Service
03	Bill Schmitt	Schmitt Racing	Chevrolet	Schmitt Racing
4	Rick Wilson	Morgan–McClure Motorsports	Oldsmobile	Kodak
04	Hershel McGriff	McGriff Racing	Pontiac	U.S. Bank
5	Geoff Bodine	Hendrick Motorsports	Chevrolet	Levi Garrett
6	Mark Martin	Roush Racing	Ford	Stroh Light
7	Alan Kulwicki	AK Racing	Ford	Zerex
8	Bobby Hillin Jr.	Stavola Brothers Racing	Buick	Miller High Life
9	Bill Elliott	Melling Racing	Ford	Coors Light
10	Ken Bouchard (R)	Whitcomb Racing	Ford	Whitcomb Racing
11	Terry Labonte	Junior Johnson & Associates	Chevrolet	Budweiser
12	Mike Alexander	Stavola Brothers Racing	Buick	Miller High Life
14	Butch Gilliland	Gilliland Racing	Buick	Anaheim Brakes & Wheels
15	Brett Bodine	Bud Moore Engineering	Ford	Crisco
17	Darrell Waltrip	Hendrick Motorsports	Chevrolet	Tide
19	Chad Little	George Jefferson Racing	Ford	Coors Extra Gold
20	Scott Gaylord	Burney Racing	Oldsmobile	Oliver Manufacturing
21	Kyle Petty	Wood Brothers Racing	Ford	Citgo
22	St. James Davis	St. James Racing	Buick	St. James Racing
23	Eddie Bierschwale	B&B Racing	Oldsmobile	Wayne Paging
24	Gary Collins	Collins Motorsports	Oldsmobile	Nex Shop
25	Ken Schrader	Hendrick Motorsports	Chevrolet	Folgers
26	Ricky Rudd	King Racing	Buick	Quaker State
27	Rusty Wallace	Blue Max Racing	Pontiac	Kodiak
28	Davey Allison	Ranier-Lundy Racing	Ford	Texaco, Havoline
29	Dale Jarrett	Cale Yarborough Motorsports	Oldsmobile	Hardee's
30	Michael Waltrip	Bahari Racing	Pontiac	Country Time
31	Johnny Rutherford	Bob Clark Motorsports	Oldsmobile	Slender You Figure Salons
33	Harry Gant	Mach 1 Racing	Chevrolet	Skoal Bandit
41	Jack Sellers	Vincent Racing	Chevrolet	Coca-Cola
43	Richard Petty	Petty Enterprises	Pontiac	STP
44	Sterling Marlin	Hagan Racing	Oldsmobile	Piedmont Airlines
52	Jimmy Means	Jimmy Means Racing	Pontiac	Eureka
55	Phil Parsons	Jackson Bros. Motorsports	Oldsmobile	Skoal, Crown Central Petroleum
66	John Krebs	Krebs Racing	Oldsmobile	Skoal
68	Derrike Cope	Testa Racing	Ford	Purolator
69	Trevor Boys	Boys Racing	Oldsmobile	Boys Racing
71	Dave Marcis	Marcis Auto Racing	Chevrolet	Lifebuoy
73	Joe Ruttman	Barkdoll Racing	Ford	Helen Rae
75	Neil Bonnett	RahMoc Enterprises	Pontiac	Valvoline
79	Roy Smith	Razore Racing	Ford	Peterbilt
82	J. C. Danielsen	Gautsche Racing	Buick	Chico Auto Parts
83	Lake Speed	Speed Racing	Oldsmobile	Wynn's, Kmart
88	Greg Sacks	Baker-Schiff Racing	Oldsmobile	Red Baron Frozen Pizza
89	Jim Sauter	Mueller Brothers Racing	Pontiac	Evinrude Outboard Motors
90	Benny Parsons	Donlavey Racing	Ford	Bull's-Eye Barbecue Sauce
95	Harry Jefferson	George Jefferson Racing	Ford	Peterbilt
98	Brad Noffsinger (R)	Curb Racing	Buick	Sunoco

== Qualifying ==
Qualifying was split into two rounds. The first round was held on Friday, November 4, at 3:00 PM EST. Each driver would have one lap to set a time. During the first round, the top 20 drivers in the round were guaranteed a starting spot in the race. If a driver was not able to guarantee a spot in the first round, they had the option to scrub their time from the first round and try and run a faster lap time in a second round qualifying run, held on Saturday, November 5, at 1:30 PM EST. As with the first round, each driver would have one lap to set a time. For this specific race, positions 21-40 were decided on time, and depending on who needed it, a select amount of positions were given to cars who had not otherwise qualified but were high enough in owner's points; which was up to two for cars in the NASCAR Winston Cup Series and up to two extra provisionals for the cars in the NASCAR Winston West Series.

Geoff Bodine, driving for Hendrick Motorsports, managed to win the pole, setting a time of 29.220 and an average speed of 123.203 miles per hour (198.276 km/h) in the first round.

Seven drivers failed to qualify.

=== Full qualifying results ===
Pos.	#	Driver	Team	Make	Time	Speed
1	5	Geoff Bodine	Hendrick Motorsports	Chevrolet	29.220	123.203
2	27	Rusty Wallace	Blue Max Racing	Pontiac	29.299	122.871
3	33	Harry Gant	Mach 1 Racing	Chevrolet	29.314	122.808
4	26	Ricky Rudd	King Racing	Buick	29.368	122.582
5	89	Jim Sauter	Mueller Brothers Racing	Pontiac	29.371	122.570
6	9	Bill Elliott	Melling Racing	Ford	29.395	122.470
7	6	Mark Martin	Roush Racing	Ford	29.422	122.357
8	75	Neil Bonnett	RahMoc Enterprises	Pontiac	29.432	122.316
9	44	Sterling Marlin	Hagan Racing	Oldsmobile	29.438	122.291
10	4	Rick Wilson	Morgan–McClure Motorsports	Oldsmobile	29.468	122.166
11	30	Michael Waltrip	Bahari Racing	Pontiac	29.503	122.021
12	83	Lake Speed	Speed Racing	Oldsmobile	29.537	121.881
13	3	Dale Earnhardt	Richard Childress Racing	Chevrolet	29.546	121.844
14	12	Mike Alexander	Stavola Brothers Racing	Buick	29.558	121.794
15	90	Benny Parsons	Donlavey Racing	Ford	29.581	121.700
16	17	Darrell Waltrip	Hendrick Motorsports	Chevrolet	29.593	121.650
17	11	Terry Labonte	Junior Johnson & Associates	Chevrolet	29.603	121.609
18	55	Phil Parsons	Jackson Bros. Motorsports	Oldsmobile	29.627	121.511
19	04	Hershel McGriff	McGriff Racing	Pontiac	29.655	121.396
20	28	Davey Allison	Ranier-Lundy Racing	Ford	29.667	121.347
Failed to lock in Round 1
21	7	Alan Kulwicki	AK Racing	Ford	29.465	122.179
22	15	Brett Bodine	Bud Moore Engineering	Ford	29.535	121.889
23	68	Derrike Cope	Testa Racing	Ford	29.624	121.523
24	25	Ken Schrader	Hendrick Motorsports	Chevrolet	29.625	121.519
25	21	Kyle Petty	Wood Brothers Racing	Ford	29.634	121.482
26	73	Joe Ruttman	Barkdoll Racing	Ford	29.674	121.322
27	2	Ernie Irvan (R)	U.S. Racing	Pontiac	29.678	121.302
28	52	Jimmy Means	Jimmy Means Racing	Pontiac	29.711	121.167
29	79	Roy Smith	Razore Racing	Ford	29.740	121.049
30	43	Richard Petty	Petty Enterprises	Pontiac	29.756	120.984
31	23	Eddie Bierschwale	B&B Racing	Oldsmobile	29.758	120.976
32	29	Dale Jarrett	Cale Yarborough Motorsports	Oldsmobile	29.775	120.907
33	8	Bobby Hillin Jr.	Stavola Brothers Racing	Buick	29.794	120.830
34	31	Johnny Rutherford	Bob Clark Motorsports	Oldsmobile	29.862	120.555
35	88	Greg Sacks	Baker-Schiff Racing	Oldsmobile	29.878	120.490
36	1	Jim Bown	Bown Racing	Chevrolet	29.987	120.052
37	19	Chad Little	George Jefferson Racing	Ford	29.993	120.028
38	71	Dave Marcis	Marcis Auto Racing	Chevrolet	30.111	119.558
39	24	Gary Collins	Collins Motorsports	Oldsmobile	30.145	119.423
40	69	Trevor Boys	Boys Racing	Oldsmobile	30.156	119.379
Winston Cup provisionals
41	10	Ken Bouchard (R)	Whitcomb Racing	Pontiac	-*	-*
42	98	Brad Noffsinger (R)	Curb Racing	Buick	-*	-*
Winston West provisional
43	03	Bill Schmitt	Schmitt Racing	Chevrolet	-*	-*
Failed to qualify (results unknown)
44	14	Butch Gilliland	Gilliland Racing	Buick	-*	-*
45	20	Scott Gaylord	Burney Racing	Oldsmobile	-*	-*
46	22	St. James Davis	St. James Racing	Buick	-*	-*
47	41	Jack Sellers	Vincent Racing	Chevrolet	-*	-*
48	66	John Krebs	Krebs Racing	Oldsmobile	-*	-*
49	82	J. C. Danielsen	Gautsche Racing	Buick	-*	-*
50	95	Harry Jefferson	George Jefferson Racing	Ford	-*	-*
Official first round qualifying results
Official starting lineup

== Race results ==
Fin	St	#	Driver	Team	Make	Laps	Led	Status	Pts	Winnings
1	21	7	Alan Kulwicki	AK Racing	Ford	312	41	running	180	$54,100
2	17	11	Terry Labonte	Junior Johnson & Associates	Chevrolet	312	2	running	175	$31,075
3	20	28	Davey Allison	Ranier-Lundy Racing	Ford	312	0	running	165	$24,275
4	6	9	Bill Elliott	Melling Racing	Ford	312	0	running	160	$19,475
5	2	27	Rusty Wallace	Blue Max Racing	Pontiac	312	68	running	160	$20,400
6	1	5	Geoff Bodine	Hendrick Motorsports	Chevrolet	311	2	running	155	$13,700
7	33	8	Bobby Hillin Jr.	Stavola Brothers Racing	Buick	311	0	running	146	$11,400
8	15	90	Benny Parsons	Donlavey Racing	Ford	311	0	running	142	$9,650
9	18	55	Phil Parsons	Jackson Bros. Motorsports	Oldsmobile	311	0	running	138	$9,050
10	9	44	Sterling Marlin	Hagan Racing	Oldsmobile	311	11	running	139	$10,150
11	13	3	Dale Earnhardt	Richard Childress Racing	Chevrolet	311	0	running	130	$15,100
12	3	33	Harry Gant	Mach 1 Racing	Chevrolet	311	0	running	127	$7,850
13	16	17	Darrell Waltrip	Hendrick Motorsports	Chevrolet	310	0	running	124	$10,550
14	24	25	Ken Schrader	Hendrick Motorsports	Chevrolet	310	0	running	121	$9,250
15	12	83	Lake Speed	Speed Racing	Oldsmobile	310	0	running	118	$4,850
16	23	68	Derrike Cope	Testa Racing	Ford	309	0	running	115	$2,450
17	25	21	Kyle Petty	Wood Brothers Racing	Ford	309	0	running	112	$9,500
18	38	71	Dave Marcis	Marcis Auto Racing	Chevrolet	308	0	running	109	$5,575
19	37	19	Chad Little	George Jefferson Racing	Ford	307	0	running	106	$4,450
20	40	69	Trevor Boys	Boys Racing	Oldsmobile	306	0	running	103	$2,875
21	8	75	Neil Bonnett	RahMoc Enterprises	Pontiac	306	0	running	100	$9,150
22	27	2	Ernie Irvan (R)	U.S. Racing	Pontiac	305	0	running	97	$3,875
23	41	10	Ken Bouchard (R)	Whitcomb Racing	Pontiac	304	0	running	94	$3,300
24	28	52	Jimmy Means	Jimmy Means Racing	Pontiac	303	0	running	91	$4,080
25	42	98	Brad Noffsinger (R)	Curb Racing	Buick	299	0	running	88	$2,175
26	4	26	Ricky Rudd	King Racing	Buick	296	183	engine	95	$17,350
27	14	12	Mike Alexander	Stavola Brothers Racing	Buick	293	5	running	87	$9,550
28	11	30	Michael Waltrip	Bahari Racing	Pontiac	292	0	running	79	$4,750
29	10	4	Rick Wilson	Morgan–McClure Motorsports	Oldsmobile	221	0	running	76	$2,690
30	29	79	Roy Smith	Razore Racing	Ford	218	0	running	73	$1,975
31	32	29	Dale Jarrett	Cale Yarborough Motorsports	Oldsmobile	215	0	engine	70	$2,600
32	5	89	Jim Sauter	Mueller Brothers Racing	Pontiac	213	0	engine	67	$1,900
33	39	24	Gary Collins	Collins Motorsports	Oldsmobile	212	0	engine	64	$2,525
34	19	04	Hershel McGriff	McGriff Racing	Pontiac	177	0	engine	61	$2,475
35	30	43	Richard Petty	Petty Enterprises	Pontiac	168	0	oilpan	58	$4,435
36	7	6	Mark Martin	Roush Racing	Ford	159	0	crash	55	$3,805
37	43	03	Bill Schmitt	Schmitt Racing	Chevrolet	157	0	crash	52	$1,795
38	35	88	Greg Sacks	Baker-Schiff Racing	Oldsmobile	157	0	crash	49	$3,775
39	34	31	Johnny Rutherford	Bob Clark Motorsports	Oldsmobile	155	0	crash	46	$3,775
40	31	23	Eddie Bierschwale	B&B Racing	Oldsmobile	133	0	engine	43	$1,750
41	26	73	Joe Ruttman	Barkdoll Racing	Ford	65	0	crash	40	$1,725
42	36	1	Jim Bown	Bown Racing	Chevrolet	64	0	engine	37	$1,725
43	22	15	Brett Bodine	Bud Moore Engineering	Ford	13	0	engine	34	$1,725
Failed to qualify (results unknown)
44		14	Butch Gilliland	Gilliland Racing	Buick					
45		20	Scott Gaylord	Burney Racing	Oldsmobile					
46		22	St. James Davis	St. James Racing	Buick					
47		41	Jack Sellers	Vincent Racing	Chevrolet					
48		66	John Krebs	Krebs Racing	Oldsmobile					
49		82	J. C. Danielsen	Gautsche Racing	Buick					
50		95	Harry Jefferson	George Jefferson Racing	Ford					
Official race results

== Standings after the race ==
Drivers' Championship standings

Pos	Driver	Points
1	Bill Elliott	4,358
2	Rusty Wallace	4,279 (-79)
3	Dale Earnhardt	4,130 (-228)
4	Terry Labonte	3,835 (–493)
5	Ken Schrader	3,703 (–655)
6	Geoff Bodine	3,676 (–682)
7	Darrell Waltrip	3,604 (–754)
8	Phil Parsons	3,515 (–843)
9	Sterling Marlin	3,489 (–869)
10	Davey Allison	3,456 (–902)
Official driver's standings

- Note: Only the first 10 positions are included for the driver standings.

Previous race: 1988 AC Delco 500	NASCAR Winston Cup Series; 1988 season	Next race: 1988 Atlanta Journal 500

Previous race: 1988 American National Bank 200	NASCAR Winston West Series; 1988 season	Next race: 1989 Budweiser 200
