= 1988 Winston 200 =

5th race of the 1988 NASCAR Winston West Series

Race details
- Race 5 of 8 in the 1988 NASCAR Winston West Series season
- Location: Portland Speedway in Portland, Oregon
- Course: Permanent racing facility
- Course length: 0.500 miles (0.804 km)
- Distance: 200 laps, 100.00 mi (160.93 km)
- Average speed: 69.659 miles per hour (112.105 km/h)

Pole position
Driver	Bill Schmitt	Schmitt Racing Enterprises

Most laps led
Driver	Hershel McGriff	McGriff Racing
- Laps: 105

Winner
No. 98	Derrike Cope	Kieper Racing

The 1988 Winston 200 was the 5th stock car race of the 1988 NASCAR Winston West Series season. The race was held on Sunday, July 10, 1988, at Portland Speedway, a 0.500 mile (0.804 km) oval shaped racetrack in Portland, Oregon. The race took the scheduled 200 laps to complete. Derrike Cope won the race, his first and only win of the season. Cope won the race by 3.47 seconds over Hershel McGriff. During a late caution, Cope made a pit stop, but quickly regained the lead from Roy Smith en route to victory. Smith, Bill Sedgwick, and Bill Schmitt rounded out the top five.

== Report ==
=== Background ===
Portland Speedway was a half-mile race track located in Portland, Oregon. The track began as a five-eighths-mile (one km) clay oval in 1924 on the site of a field in north Portland. The track hosted big cars, midget cars, and stock cars before the suspension of racing during World War II. It was paved in 1946 as a half-mile oval. The 1988 Winston 200 was one of 36 NASCAR Winston West Series races held at the track.

==== Entry list ====
No.	Driver	Owner	Manufacturer
1	Jim Bown	Dick Bown	Chevrolet
2	Scott Gaylord	Geoff Burney	Oldsmobile
04	Hershel McGriff	Hershel McGriff	Pontiac
7	Ron Eaton	Ron Eaton	Buick
07	Mark Walbridge	Unknown	Ford
11	Rick Catalano	Unknown	Buick
16	Reno Fontana	Dave Phelps	Pontiac
19	Chad Little	George Jefferson/Fred Stoke	Ford
22	St. James Davis	LaDonna Davis	Buick
33	John Krebs	John Krebs	Oldsmobile
41	Jack Sellers	Sara Vincent	Chevrolet
68	Larry Gaylord	Larry Gaylord	Oldsmobile
72	Brad Tidrick	Cindi Tidrick	Buick
73	Bill Schmitt	Bill Schmitt	Chevrolet
75	Bill Sedgwick	Wayne Spears	Chevrolet
79	Roy Smith	Warren Razore	Ford
82	J.C. Danielsen	Shirnell Gautsche	Buick
83	Sumner McKnight	Sumner McKnight	Ford
89	Bob Howard	Tom Hathaway	Oldsmobile
98	Derrike Cope	John Kieper	Chevrolet

== Qualifying ==
Bill Schmitt won the pole with an average speed of 86.659 mph.

== Race results ==
Fin	St	#	Driver	Owner	Make	Laps	Led	Status	Pts
1	9	98	Derrike Cope	John Kieper	Chevrolet	200	68	Running	60
2	2	04	Hershel McGriff	Hershel McGriff	Pontiac	200	105	Running	49
3	6	79	Roy Smith	Warren Razore	Ford	200	6	Running	48
4	7	75	Bill Sedgwick	Wayne Spears	Chevrolet	198	0	Running	47
5	1	73	Bill Schmitt	Bill Schmitt	Chevrolet	197	11	Running	46
6	16	72	Brad Tidrick	Cindi Tidrick	Buick	197	0	Running	45
7	12	89	Bob Howard	Tom Hathaway	Oldsmobile	194	0	Running	44
8	13	33	John Krebs	John Krebs	Oldsmobile	194	0	Running	43
9	11	82	J.C. Danielsen	Shirnell Gautsche	Buick	194	0	Running	42
10	17	16	Reno Fontana	Dave Phelps	Pontiac	183	0	Running	41
11	18	68	Larry Gaylord	Larry Gaylord	Oldsmobile	178	0	Running	40
12	15	41	Jack Sellers	Sara Vincent	Chevrolet	172	0	Running	39
13	10	19	Chad Little	George Jefferson/Fred Stoke	Ford	172	10	Transmission	38
14	14	2	Scott Gaylord	Geoff Burney	Oldsmobile	161	0	Running	37
15	5	1	Jim Bown	Dick Bown	Chevrolet	126	0	Rear End	36
16	8	07	Mark Walbridge	Unknown	Ford	86	0	Overheating	35
17	4	7	Ron Eaton	Ron Eaton	Buick	82	0	Overheating	34
18	19	11	Rick Catalano	Unknown	Buick	72	0	Overheating	33
19	20	22	St. James Davis	LaDonna Davis	Buick	27	0	Overheating	32
20	3	83	Sumner McKnight	Sumner McKnight	Ford	21	0	Accident	31

== Standings after the race ==
Pos	Driver	Points
1	Roy Smith	262
2	Bill Schmitt	240 (-22)
3	Chad Little	217 (-45)
4	Jim Bown	198 (-64)
5	Hershel McGriff	197 (-65)
6	John Krebs	193 (-69)
7	J.C. Danielsen	178 (-84)
8	Bob Howard	169 (-93)
9	Scott Gaylord	163 (-99)
10	Sumner McKnight	146 (-116)

- Note: Only the first 10 positions are included for the driver standings.

Previous race: 1988 Budweiser 300	NASCAR Winston West Series; 1988 season	Next race: 1988 Motorcraft 500
