= John Soares Jr. =

American racing driver (1942–2022)

- Born: May 18, 1942; Hayward, California, U.S.
- Died: July 16, 2022 (aged 80)
- Cause of death: Sepsis

NASCAR Cup Series career
- 13 races run over 6 years
- Best finish: 61st (1985)
- First race: 1970 Falstaff 400 (Riverside)
- Last race: 1985 Winston Western 500 (Riverside)
Wins	Top tens	Poles
0	2	0

ARCA Menards Series West career
- 137 races run over 16 years
- Best finish: 5th (1971, 1972)
- First race: 1969 Race 19 (San Gabriel)
- Last race: 1988 7-Up 200 (Sonoma)
- First win: 1971 Race 4 (San Jose)
Wins	Top tens	Poles
1	54	3
- Statistics up to date as of June 1, 2026.

John Michael Soares Jr. (May 18, 1942 – July 16, 2022) was an American professional stock car racing driver and crew chief. He primarily competed in the NASCAR Winston West Series between 1969 and 1988. He was the son of fellow driver John Soares.

== Racing career ==
Soares Jr. began his racing career in drag racing in a car built by his father John Soares. He did not enjoy drag racing but continued to appease his father; at the same time, he would sneak off to race oval tracks, winning in his first night in a supermodified at San Jose Fairgrounds Speedway. His career as a driver nearly ended after a wreck at Antioch Speedway in 1968; doctors initially wanted to amputate his arm. After healing, he won the 1969 NASCAR California State sportsman championship.

Soares Jr. made his first known NASCAR Pacific Coast Late Model Division start in 1969 at Speedway 605, originally planning to drive his own entry before withdrawing and driving for Wes Wiltshire; he would finish fourteenth.

In 1970, Soares Jr. ran twelve races in the renamed Grand National West, scoring eight top tens, including a runner-up finish. He failed to qualify for the first race of the NASCAR Grand National Series season at Riverside International Raceway, but would make his Grand National debut in the second combination race at the track, where he finished in fourth.

Soares Jr. ran twenty-two of twenty-six races in the renamed Winston West Series in 1971, scoring his lone career win at San Jose Speedway as well as a pole, fifteen top-tens, and seven top-fives. He finished fifth in the final standings. He competed in four Winston Cup races that year, running the three combination races with the West Series as well as the Delaware 500 at Dover Downs International Speedway; his best finish of the season was his second and final career top-ten in the series, a sixth-place finish at Riverside.

Soares Jr. would run his first full-time Winston West season in 1972, scoring ten top-tens across 30 races. He again finished fifth in the standings. In the three combination races, he scored a best finish of eleventh in the first race at Riverside.

Soares Jr. competed in all but one West Series race in 1973, scoring a pole and eight top-ten finishes. There were no combination races during this season, but Soares Jr. would still compete in the Winston Cup races at Riverside, where mechanical issues prevented him from finishing both events.

In 1974, Soares Jr. would scale back to running only sixteen of 28 West Series races, only scoring two top-ten finishes. He did not make any Winston Cup starts during the season.

Soares Jr. ran just six Winston West races in 1975, again scoring two top-tens. In his lone Winston Cup start, transmission issues caused him to retire from and finish 31st in the Tuborg 400 at Riverside.

Soares Jr. competed in five West Series races in 1976, where he scored a best finish of sixth, failing to finish in the other four races.

Soares Jr. made only three starts in 1977, scoring a best finish of sixth. He failed to qualify for the Winston Cup season opener at Riverside.

In 1978, Soares Jr. ran four West Series races, finishing inside the top-twenty in each of them. He did not compete in NASCAR in 1979.

Soares Jr. returned for two events in 1980, failing to qualify at Stockton 99 Speedway and finishing seventh at Sears Point International Raceway.

Soares Jr. would not compete in the series again until 1983, when he competed at Caesars Palace and finished 22nd.

Soares Jr. returned for three events in 1984, scoring a top-ten at Sears Point and finishing sixteenth at Evergreen; his other attempt came in a combination race at Riverside, where he failed to qualify.

In 1985, Soares ran full-time in the West Series for the second and final time, where he scored five top-tens across twelve races. This schedule included his final Winston Cup starts, where he finished nineteenth and 30th in the races at Riverside.

Soares Jr. competed in one Winston West race in 1986, finishing fifteenth at Portland International Raceway. He failed to qualify for his final Winston Cup attempt at Riverside.

Soares Jr. made his final NASCAR start in 1988 at Sears Point, finishing 25th due to engine issues.

Soares Jr. failed to qualify for the first two races of the Wild West Shootout in 2006. He ran two super late model races at Irwindale Speedway in 2010.

== Crew chief and track promotion career ==
When not competing as a driver, Soares was a crew chief for Rod Osterlund's NASCAR Winston Cup Series team. He was the promoter of the USA versus Australia Sedan Racing Series in Australia for several years and was also a well-respected car builder. In 1998, he became the promoter of Antioch Speedway, the same track where his racing career nearly ended in 1968, taking over for his father.

== Death ==
On July 15, 2022, racing driver Shawn DeForest found Soares on the floor of his home complaining of stomach pain. Soares died in the hospital the following day of sepsis.
