= 1975 Los Angeles Times 500 =

Auto race held at Ontario Motor Speedway in 1975

Race details
- Race 30 of 30 in the 1975 NASCAR Winston Cup Series season
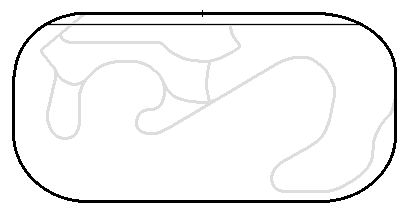
- Date: November 23, 1975
- Official name: Los Angeles Times 500
- Location: Ontario Motor Speedway, Ontario, California
- Course: Permanent racing facility
- Course length: 4.023 km (2.500 miles)
- Distance: 200 laps, 500 mi (804 km)
- Weather: Warm with temperatures of 82 °F (28 °C); wind speeds of 8.9 miles per hour (14.3 km/h)
- Average speed: 140.712 miles per hour (226.454 km/h)
- Attendance: 50,106

Pole position
Driver	Buddy Baker	Bud Moore Engineering

Most laps led
Driver	Buddy Baker	Bud Moore Engineering
- Laps: 148

Winner
No. 15	Buddy Baker	Bud Moore Engineering

Television in the United States
- Network: untelevised
- Announcers: none

The 1975 Los Angeles Times 500 was a NASCAR Winston Cup Series race that took place on November 23, 1975, at Ontario Motor Speedway in Ontario, California.

This was the last race where the car's model year was part of the race info. From 1975 onwards, the passenger vehicles that people actually drove in real life started to deviate from the stock cars exhibited in NASCAR due to environmental regulations on the automobile industry. The gulf between NASCAR vehicles and regular passenger automobiles started to become even greater throughout the 1970s, 1980s, and 1990s. By the 21st century, regular passenger vehicles had nothing to do with the NASCAR vehicles except for the manufacturer name and the model of the vehicle.

== Race report ==
Two hundred laps were completed in three hours and thirty-three minutes on the paved track spanning 2.500 miles (4.023 km). More than 50,000 spectators see Buddy Baker defeat David Pearson by 29.4 seconds in the #15 Norris Industries Ford machine. Only one caution for nine laps slowed the action. Pearson would earn the pole position with a speed of 153.525 miles per hour (247.075 km/h), the average race of the speed would be 140.712 miles per hour (226.454 km/h). The total prize purse was $140,775 ($822,623.98 when adjusted for inflation); Baker would receive $35,300 of it ($206,276.87 when adjusted for inflation) while Negre earned $1,050 ($6,135.71 when adjusted for inflation).

Out of the 40-driver grid, 39 were American-born while Roy Smith was a Canadian. Cecil Gordon had engine problems that put him out of the race on lap 141; which nearly destroyed his vehicle. A tie-rod end had backed out and was just hanging on.

Ed Negre would be the last-place finisher due to an engine problem on the second lap. Richard Childress finished tenth in his final race at the wheel of Tom Garn's #96. Childress became an owner-driver for 1976 and changed numbers to #3.

Notable crew chiefs in this race were Tim Brewer, Travis Carter, Harry Hyde, Dale Inman, Bud Moore among others. Carl Adams; Jim Boyd; Don Hall and John Martin all made what would be their final starts in NASCAR's top series.

Richard Petty had already clinched his sixth NASCAR championship; defeating Dave Marcis in the standings by more than 700 points.

=== Qualifying ===
Grid	No.	Driver	Manufacturer
1	21	David Pearson	'73 Mercury
2	15	Buddy Baker	'75 Ford
3	71	Dave Marcis	'74 Dodge
4	16	Bobby Allison	'75 AMC Matador
5	28	A.J. Foyt	'75 Chevrolet
6	43	Richard Petty	'74 Dodge
7	11	Cale Yarborough	'75 Chevrolet
8	38	Jimmy Insolo	'75 Chevrolet
9	72	Benny Parsons	'75 Chevrolet
10	90	Dick Brooks	'73 Ford
11	47	Bruce Hill	'75 Chevrolet
12	54	Lennie Pond	'75 Chevrolet
13	98	Richie Panch	'75 Mercury
14	96W	Ray Elder	'74 Dodge
15	68	Sonny Easley	'73 Ford
16	24	Cecil Gordon	'75 Chevrolet
17	70	J.D. McDuffie	'75 Chevrolet
18	29	Roy Smith	'75 Chevrolet
19	26	Hershel McGriff	'75 Chevrolet
20	03	Chuck Bown	'74 Dodge
21	64	Elmo Langley	'73 Ford
22	5	Jim Thirkettle	'75 Chevrolet
23	63	Don Hoffman	'75 Chevrolet
24	79	Frank Warren	'74 Dodge
25	39	Tom Williams	'74 Chevrolet

== Finishing order ==
Section reference:

1. Buddy Baker (No. 15)
2. David Pearson (No. 21)
3. Dave Marcis (No. 71)
4. Cale Yarborough (No. 11)
5. Bobby Allison (No. 16)
6. Lennie Pond (No. 54)
7. Jimmy Insolo (No. 38)
8. Dick Brooks† (No. 90)
9. James Hylton† (No. 48)
10. Richard Childress (No. 96)
11. Don Hall (No. 01)
12. David Sisco (No. 05)
13. D.K. Ulrich (No. 40)
14. A. J. Foyt* (No. 28)
15. Don Huffman (No. 63)
16. Richard Petty* (No. 43)
17. Frank Warren* (No. 79)
18. Hugh Pearson* (No. 76)
19. Cecil Gordon*† (No. 24)
20. Walter Ballard* (No. 30)
21. J.D. McDuffie*† (No. 70)
22. Elmo Langley*† (No. 64)
23. Tom Williams* (No. 39)
24. John Kieper* (No. 98W)
25. Ray Elder*† (No. 96W)
26. Bruce Hill* (No. 47)
27. Jim Boyd* (No. 31)
28. Carl Adams* (No. 65)
29. Roy Smith*† (No. 29)
30. John Martin* (No. 2)
31. Hershel McGriff* (No. 26)
32. Jim Thirkettle* (No. 5)
33. Bill Schmitt* (No. 73)
34. Benny Parsons*† (No. 72)
35. Chuck Wahl* (No. 37)
36. Richie Panch*† (No. 98)
37. Don Puskarich* (No. 10)
38. Chuck Bown* (No. 03)
39. Sonny Easley*† (No. 68)
40. Ed Negre* (No. 8)

† signifies that the driver is known to be deceased
* Driver failed to finish race

== Standings after the race ==
Pos	Driver	Points	Differential
1	Richard Petty	4783	0
2	Dave Marcis	4061	-722
3	James Hylton	3914	-869
4	Benny Parsons	3820	-963
5	Richard Childress	3818	-965
6	Cecil Gordon	3702	-1081
7	Darrell Waltrip	3462	-1303
8 ▲	Elmo Langley	3399	-1321
9 ▼	Cale Yarborough	3295	-1384
10 ▲	Dick Brooks	3182	-1601

Preceded by 1975 Dixie 500	NASCAR Winston Cup Series Season; 1975-76	Succeeded by 1976 Winston Western 500

Preceded by 1974	Los Angeles Times 500 races 1975	Succeeded by 1976
