= Scott Gaylord =

American racing driver (born 1958)

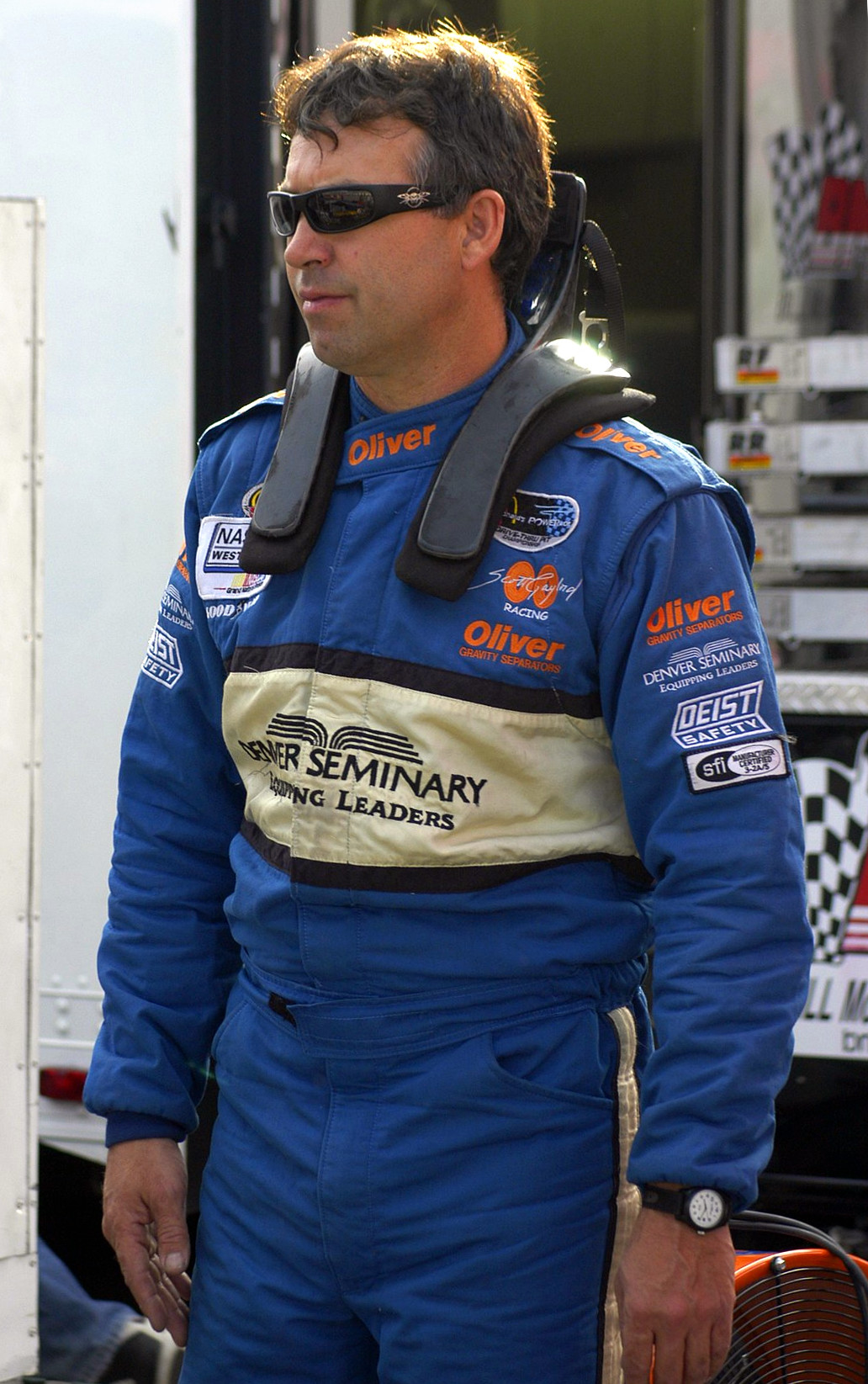
- Gaylord wearing a HANS device in 2005
- Born: August 12, 1958 (age 68); Lakewood, Colorado, U.S.

NASCAR Cup Series career
- 8 races run over 4 years
- Best finish: 65th (1996)
- First race: 1991 Banquet Frozen Foods 300 (Sonoma)
- Last race: 1996 Save Mart Supermarkets 300 (Sonoma)
| Wins | Top tens | Poles |
|---|---|---|
| 0 | 0 | 0 |

NASCAR O'Reilly Auto Parts Series career
- 17 races run over 9 years
- 2009 position: 121st
- Best finish: 77th (2008)
- First race: 1997 Lysol 200 (Watkins Glen)
- Last race: 2009 Sam's Town 300 (Las Vegas)
| Wins | Top tens | Poles |
|---|---|---|
| 0 | 0 | 0 |
- Statistics up to date as of May 26, 2010.

Scott Gaylord (born August 12, 1958) is an American professional stock car racing driver. He has competed in four NASCAR Winston Cup Series races, all at Sears Point Raceway, most recently in 1996. He has been a longtime competitor in the NASCAR West Series. Many of his starts in NASCAR's highest levels have been on the West Coast of the United States (Infineon, Phoenix) and on road courses (Watkins Glen).

Gaylord has been a longtime competitor in the Winston West / Camping World West Series, competing against Ron Hornaday and Kevin Harvick. He regularly competed for over a dozen years, accumulating six pole positions and over 24 top-five finishes. His best career West finishes were two second-place finishes.

== Racing career ==
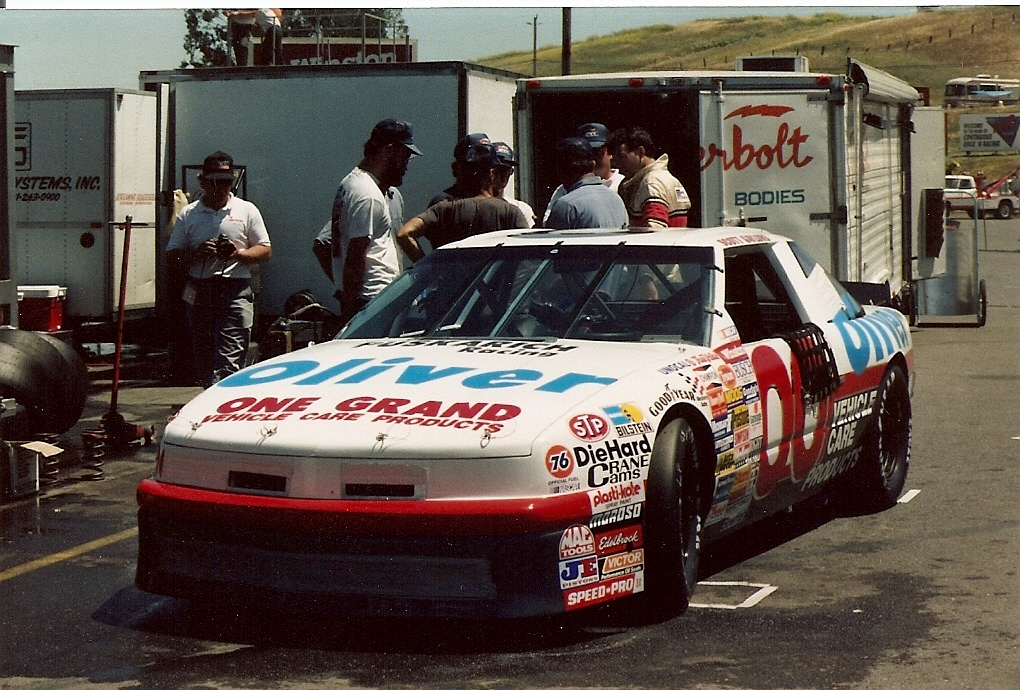
Gaylord first Cup car in the pits at Sears Point in 1991

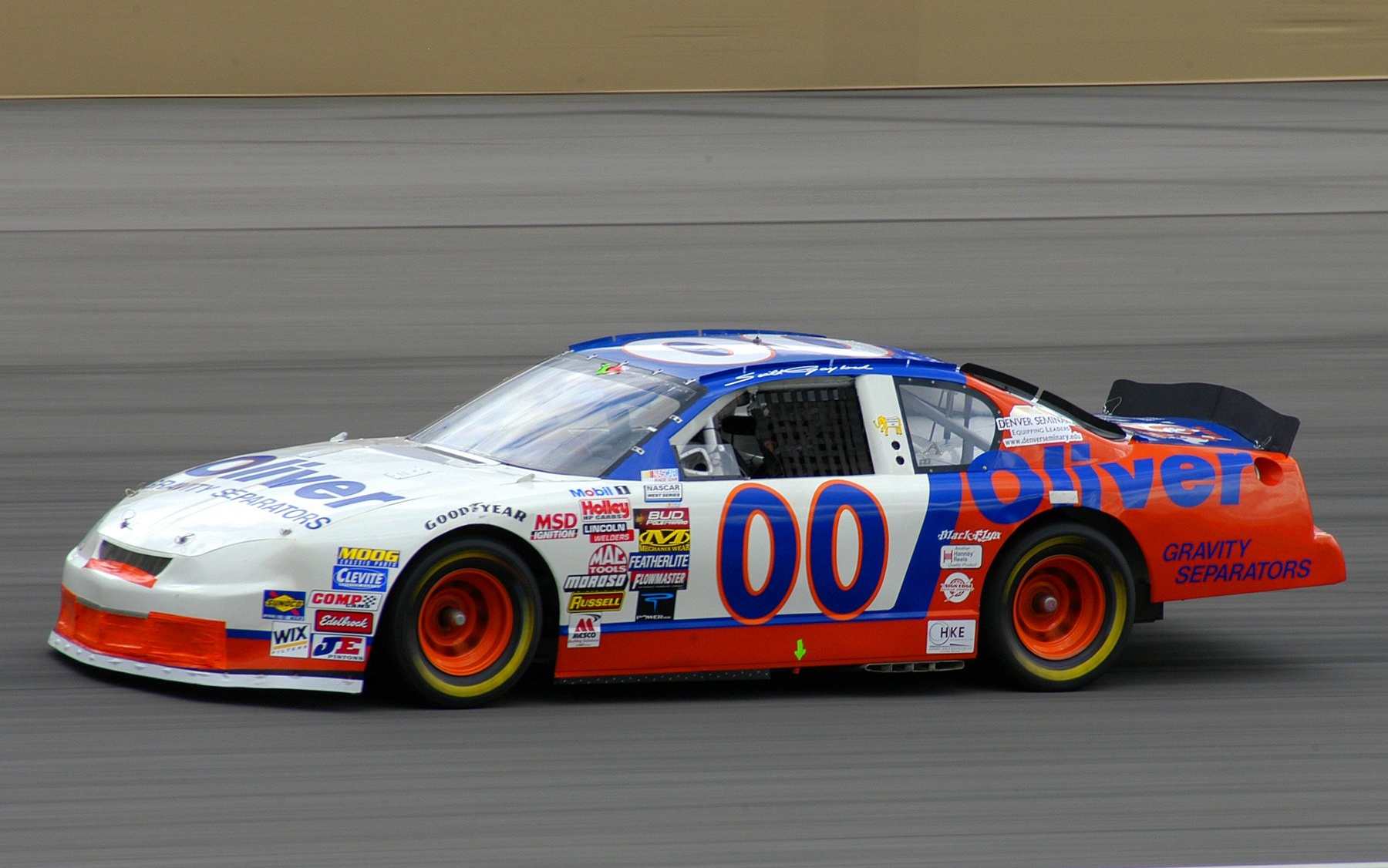
Gaylord on the track in his West Series car in 2005

Gaylord followed in his father's footsteps by starting to race on road courses and he has over sixty wins on circuits. He has won class championships in SCCA and IMSA, and has also competed in numerous 24 Hours of Daytona events.

Gaylord regularly competed in the NASCAR West Series, a regional touring series on the west coast of the United States. He was named the "Most Popular Driver" in the series in 1998 and 2002. Since entering the series in 1988, he has accumulated 87 top-fives and five poles, but has yet to earn a win.

=== Winston Cup Series ===
Gaylord's first attempt in the series came in 1988, when he failed to qualify at Phoenix International Raceway. He would make his next attempt in 1991 at Sears Point Raceway. Driving the No. 00 Oldsmobile for Geoff Burney, he qualified 31st and finished 33rd, thirteen laps down. In 1992 and 1993, Gaylord ran the Sears Point race in the No. 52 Chevrolet for Means Racing, earning a career-best finish of 29th in 1993. After failing to qualify for any races in 1994 or 1995, he made his final series start in 1996. In a self-prepared No. 00 Chevrolet, he qualified 29th and finished 38th, once again at Sears Point.

=== Nationwide Series ===
Gaylord made his in the then-NASCAR Busch Series debut in 1997 at Watkins Glen International. He qualified 16th and finished 28th in the No. 77 Lear Corporation Ford for Moy Racing. In 1999, he would return to Watkins Glen and the No. 77 car, earning his career-best finish of 25th. Starting in 2001, Gaylord occasionally ran for Means Racing in the No. 52 Chevrolet. His best season with the team came in 2008 when he drove in six races, finishing 29th at both Circuit Gilles Villeneuve and Kansas Speedway. In 2005, he made one start for NEMCO Motorsports, finishing 31st in the No. 7 Boudreaux's Butt Paste Chevrolet at Phoenix.

== Personal life ==
Gaylord's father Les Gaylord was a race car driver. Les' first competed in 1951 on an Aspen, Colorado street course with his wife as the passenger. He won many SCCA regional and national events. Les stopped racing when a serious accident caused the eighty-year-old to retire.

Gaylord asked his future wife, Donna, for their first date over his pit radio while driving slowly during a caution period of an SCCA Escort Endurance Championship event and competing against her. She continued to race until she became pregnant with their second child. During her career, she won an SCCA Divisional championship and an SCCA Escort Endurance event. Their sons, Tripp and Ryan, are both race winners. When fourteen-year-old Tripp attempted his first start in racing, he used his mother's driver's suit.

Gaylord runs Gaylord's Garage in Lakewood, Colorado when he is not racing.

Gaylord's son, Tripp Gaylord, made his West Series debut in 2022 in the race at Kern County Raceway Park.

== Motorsports career results ==
=== SCCA National Championship Runoffs ===
| Year | Track | Car | Class | Finish | Start | Status |
|---|---|---|---|---|---|---|
| 1980 | Road Atlanta | Mazda RX-7 | Showroom Stock A | 13 | 19 | Running |
| 1985 | Road Atlanta | Honda CRX | Showroom Stock C | 1 | 1 | Running |

=== NASCAR ===
(key) (Bold – Pole position awarded by qualifying time. Italics – Pole position earned by points standings or practice time. * – Most laps led.)

==== Winston Cup Series ====
NASCAR Winston Cup Series results
| Year | Team | No. | Make | 1 | 2 | 3 | 4 | 5 | 6 | 7 | 8 | 9 | 10 | 11 | 12 | 13 | 14 | 15 | 16 | 17 | 18 | 19 | 20 | 21 | 22 | 23 | 24 | 25 | 26 | 27 | 28 | 29 | 30 | 31 | 32 | NWCC | Pts | Ref |
|---|---|---|---|---|---|---|---|---|---|---|---|---|---|---|---|---|---|---|---|---|---|---|---|---|---|---|---|---|---|---|---|---|---|---|---|---|---|---|
| 1988 | Oliver Racing | 20W | Olds | DAY | RCH | CAR | ATL | DAR | BRI | NWS | MAR | TAL | CLT | DOV | RSD; DNQ | POC | MCH | DAY | POC | TAL | GLN | MCH | BRI | DAR | RCH | DOV | MAR | CLT | NWS | CAR | PHO; DNQ | ATL | | | | NA | - | |
| 1991 | Oliver Racing | 00 | Olds | DAY | RCH | CAR | ATL | DAR | BRI | NWS | MAR | TAL | CLT | DOV | SON; 33 | POC | MCH | DAY | POC | TAL | GLN | MCH | BRI | DAR | RCH | DOV | MAR | NWS | CLT | CAR | PHO; DNQ | ATL | | | | 80th | 64 | |
| 1992 | Jimmy Means Racing | 52 | Pontiac | DAY | CAR | RCH | ATL | DAR | BRI | NWS | MAR | TAL | CLT | DOV | SON | POC | MCH | DAY | POC | TAL | GLN | MCH | BRI | DAR | RCH | DOV | MAR | NWS | CLT | CAR | PHO; 37 | ATL | | | | 87th | 52 | |
| 1993 | Jimmy Means Racing | 52 | Pontiac | DAY | CAR | RCH | ATL | DAR | BRI | NWS | MAR | TAL | SON; DNQ | CLT | DOV | POC | MCH | DAY | NHA | POC | TAL | | | | | | | | | | | | | | | 74th | 76 | |
| 1993 | Jimmy Means Racing | 52 | Olds | | | | | | | | | | | | | | | | | | | GLN; 29 | MCH | BRI | DAR | RCH | DOV | MAR | NWS | CLT | CAR | | | | | 74th | 76 | |
| 1993 | Jimmy Means Racing | 52 | Ford | | | | | | | | | | | | | | | | | | | | | | | | | | | | | PHO; DNQ | ATL | | | 74th | 76 | |
| 1994 | Jimmy Means Racing | 52 | Ford | DAY | CAR | RCH | ATL | DAR | BRI | NWS | MAR | TAL | SON; DNQ | CLT | DOV | POC | MCH | DAY | NHA | POC | TAL | | | | | | | | | | | | | | | NA | - | |
| 1994 | Oliver Racing | 00W | Ford | | | | | | | | | | | | | | | | | | | IND; DNQ | | | | | | | | | | | PHO; DNQ | ATL | | NA | - | |
| 1994 | Oliver Racing | 00 | Ford | | | | | | | | | | | | | | | | | | | | GLN; DNQ | MCH | BRI | DAR | RCH | DOV | MAR | NWS | CLT | CAR | | | | NA | - | |
| 1995 | Oliver Racing | 00W | Ford | DAY | CAR | RCH | ATL | DAR | BRI | NWS | MAR | TAL | SON; DNQ | CLT | DOV | POC | MCH | DAY | NHA | POC | TAL | IND | GLN | MCH | BRI | DAR | RCH | DOV | MAR | NWS | CLT | CAR | PHO; DNQ | ATL | | NA | - | |
| 1996 | Oliver Racing | 00 | Chevy | DAY | CAR | RCH | ATL | DAR | BRI | NWS | MAR | TAL | SON; 38 | CLT | DOV | POC | MCH | DAY | NHA | POC | TAL | IND | GLN | MCH | BRI | DAR | RCH | DOV | MAR | NWS | CLT | CAR | PHO; DNQ | ATL | | 65th | 49 | |
| 1997 | Oliver Racing | 00W | Chevy | DAY | CAR | RCH | ATL | DAR | TEX | BRI | MAR | SON; DNQ | TAL | CLT | DOV | POC | MCH | CAL | DAY | NHA | POC | IND | GLN | MCH | BRI | DAR | RCH | NHA | DOV | MAR | CLT | TAL | CAR | PHO | ATL | NA | - | |

==== Nationwide Series ====
NASCAR Nationwide Series results
| Year | Team | No. | Make | 1 | 2 | 3 | 4 | 5 | 6 | 7 | 8 | 9 | 10 | 11 | 12 | 13 | 14 | 15 | 16 | 17 | 18 | 19 | 20 | 21 | 22 | 23 | 24 | 25 | 26 | 27 | 28 | 29 | 30 | 31 | 32 | 33 | 34 | 35 | NNSC | Pts | Ref |
|---|---|---|---|---|---|---|---|---|---|---|---|---|---|---|---|---|---|---|---|---|---|---|---|---|---|---|---|---|---|---|---|---|---|---|---|---|---|---|---|---|---|
| 1997 | PRW Racing | 77 | Ford | DAY | CAR | RCH | ATL | LVS | DAR | HCY | TEX | BRI | NSV | TAL | NHA | NZH | CLT | DOV | SBO | GLN; 28 | MLW | MYB | GTY | IRP | MCH | BRI | DAR | RCH | DOV | CLT | CAL | CAR | HOM | | | | | | 102nd | 79 | |
| 1999 | PRW Racing | 77 | Ford | DAY | CAR | LVS | ATL | DAR | TEX | NSV | BRI | TAL | CAL | NHA | RCH | NZH | CLT | DOV | SBO | GLN; 25 | MLW | MYB | | | | | | | | | | | | | | | | | 112nd | 88 | |
| 1999 | PRW Racing | 52 | Ford | | | | | | | | | | | | | | | | | | | | PPR; DNQ | GTY | IRP | MCH | BRI | DAR | RCH | DOV | CLT | CAR | MEM | PHO | HOM | | | | 112nd | 88 | |
| 2000 | PRW Racing | 77 | Ford | DAY | CAR | LVS | ATL | DAR | BRI | TEX | NSV | TAL | CAL | RCH | NHA | CLT | DOV | SBO | MYB | GLN | MLW | NZH | PPR; 37 | GTY | IRP | MCH | BRI | DAR | RCH | DOV | CLT | CAR | MEM | PHO | HOM | | | | 107th | 52 | |
| 2001 | Jimmy Means Racing | 52 | Ford | DAY | CAR | LVS; 42 | ATL | DAR | BRI | TEX | NSH | TAL | CAL | RCH | NHA | NZH | CLT | DOV | KEN | MLW | GLN | CHI | GTY | PPR; 42 | IRP | MCH | BRI | DAR | RCH | DOV | KAN | CLT | MEM | PHO | CAR | HOM | | | 119th | 74 | |
| 2002 | Jimmy Means Racing | 52 | Ford | DAY | CAR | LVS | DAR | BRI | TEX | NSH | TAL | CAL; 40 | RCH | NHA | NZH | CLT | DOV | NSH | KEN | MLW | DAY | CHI | GTY | PPR | IRP | MCH | BRI | DAR | RCH | DOV | KAN | CLT | MEM | ATL | CAR | PHO | HOM | | 119th | 43 | |
| 2005 | Jimmy Means Racing | 52 | Ford | DAY | CAL | MXC; QL^{†} | LVS | ATL | NSH | BRI | TEX | | | | | | | | | | | | | | | | | | | | | | | | | | | | 125th | 70 | |
| 2005 | GIC-Mixon Motorsports | 7 | Chevy | | | | | | | | | PHO; 31 | TAL | DAR | RCH | CLT | DOV | NSH | KEN | MLW | DAY | CHI | NHA | PPR | GTY | IRP | GLN | MCH | BRI | CAL | RCH | DOV | KAN | CLT | MEM | TEX | PHO | HOM | 125th | 70 | |
| 2007 | Jimmy Means Racing | 52 | Ford | DAY | CAL | MXC | LVS | ATL | BRI | NSH | TEX | PHO | TAL | RCH | DAR | CLT | DOV | NSH | KEN | MLW | NHA | DAY | CHI | GTY | IRP | CGV; 39 | GLN; 40 | MCH | BRI | CAL | RCH | DOV | KAN | CLT | MEM | TEX | PHO | HOM | 132nd | 89 | |
| 2008 | Jimmy Means Racing | 55 | Ford | DAY | CAL | LVS | ATL | BRI | NSH | TEX | PHO; 43 | | | | | | | | | | | | | | | | | | | | | | | | | | | | 77th | 312 | |
| 2008 | Jimmy Means Racing | 52 | Ford | | | | | | | | | MXC; 42 | TAL | RCH | DAR | CLT | DOV | NSH | KEN | MLW | NHA | DAY | CHI | GTY | IRP | CGV; 29 | GLN | MCH | BRI | | | | | | | | | | 77th | 312 | |
| 2008 | Jimmy Means Racing | 52 | Chevy | | | | | | | | | | | | | | | | | | | | | | | | | | | CAL; 40 | RCH | DOV | KAN; 29 | CLT | MEM | TEX | PHO; 39 | HOM | 77th | 312 | |
| 2009 | Jimmy Means Racing | 52 | Chevy | DAY | CAL; 32 | LVS; 36 | BRI | TEX | NSH | PHO | TAL | RCH | DAR | CLT | DOV | NSH | KEN | MLW | NHA | DAY | CHI | GTY | IRP | IOW | GLN; DNQ | MCH | BRI | CGV | ATL | RCH | DOV | KAN | CAL | CLT | MEM | TEX | PHO | HOM | 121st | 122 | |
^{†} - Qualified but replaced by Jimmy Morales

==== West Series ====
NASCAR West Series results
| Year | Team | No. | Make | 1 | 2 | 3 | 4 | 5 | 6 | 7 | 8 | 9 | 10 | 11 | 12 | 13 | 14 | 15 | NWSC | Pts | Ref |
|---|---|---|---|---|---|---|---|---|---|---|---|---|---|---|---|---|---|---|---|---|---|
| 1988 | | | | SON; 7 | MMR; 8 | RSD; DNQ | SGP; 12 | POR; 14 | EVG; 11 | MMR; 13 | PHO; DNQ | | | | | | | | 8th | 309 | |
| 1991 | | | | EVG; 19 | MMR; 9 | SON; 33 | SGS | POR | EVG | SSS | MMR | PHO; DNQ | | | | | | | 14th | 531 | |
| 1992 | | | | MMR | SGS | SON | SHA | POR | EVG | SSS | CAJ | TWS | MMR | PHO; 37 | | | | | 37th | 146 | |
| 1993 | | | | TWS | MMR | SGS | SON; DNQ | TUS | SHA | EVG | POR | CBS | SSS | CAJ | TCR | MMR | PHO; DNQ | | 33rd | 251 | |
| 1994 | | | | MMR; 16 | TUS | SON; DNQ | SGS | YAK | MMR | POR; 6 | IND; DNQ | CAJ | TCR | LVS | MMR; 7 | PHO; DNQ | TUS | | 17th | 862 | |
| 1995 | | | | TUS; 14 | MMR; 3 | SON; DNQ | CNS; 15 | MMR; 2 | POR; 18 | SGS; 11 | TUS; 11 | AMP; 19 | MAD; 4 | POR; 22 | LVS; 11 | SON; 3 | MMR; 22 | PHO; DNQ | 6th | 1839 | |
| 1996 | | | | TUS; 25 | AMP; 2 | MMR; 18 | SON; 38 | MAD; 13 | POR; 5 | TUS; 16 | EVG; 12 | CNS; 11 | **MAD**; 3 | MMR; 3 | **SON**; 4 | MMR; 20 | PHO; DNQ | LVS; 9 | 5th | 1883 | |
| 1997 | | | | TUS; 16 | AMP; 6 | SON; DNQ | TUS; 9 | MMR; 4 | LVS; 7 | CAL; 9 | EVG; 4 | POR; 13 | PPR; 6 | AMP; 12 | SON; 23 | MMR; 19 | LVS; 31 | | 6th | 1706 | |
| 1998 | | | | TUS; 14 | LVS; 14 | PHO; 24 | CAL; 31 | HPT; 5 | MMR; 13 | AMP; 7 | POR; 11 | CAL; 15 | PPR; 17 | EVG; 7 | SON; 10 | MMR; 6 | LVS; 16 | | 9th | 1748 | |
| 1999 | | | | TUS; 11 | LVS; 36 | PHO; 10 | CAL; 36 | PPR; 15 | MMR | IRW | EVG | POR | IRW | RMR; 9 | LVS | MMR; 24 | MOT; 16 | | 20th | 846 | |
| 2000 | | | | PHO; 9 | MMR; 11 | LVS; 14 | CAL; 12 | LAG; 12 | IRW; 15 | POR; 19 | EVG; 10 | IRW; 3 | RMR; 5 | MMR; 21 | IRW; 8 | | | | 10th | 1568 | |
| 2001 | | | | PHO; 10 | LVS; 9 | TUS; 10 | MMR; 8 | CAL; 13 | IRW; 6 | LAG; 6 | KAN; 15 | EVG; 20 | CNS; 11 | IRW; 7 | RMR; 7 | LVS; 6 | IRW; 24 | | 8th | 1861 | |
| 2002 | | | | PHO; 24 | LVS; 5 | CAL; 9 | KAN; 15 | EVG; 6 | IRW; 6 | S99; 11 | RMR; 3 | DCS; 17 | LVS; 9 | | | | | | 8th | 1382 | |
| 2003 | | | | PHO; 9 | LVS; 7 | CAL; 12 | MAD; 9 | TCR; 3 | EVG; 3 | IRW; 4 | S99; 10 | RMR; 5 | DCS; 20 | PHO; 6 | MMR; 8 | | | | 5th | 1733 | |
| 2004 | | | | PHO; 7 | MMR; 4 | CAL; 4 | S99; 20 | EVG; 5 | IRW; 3 | S99; 4 | RMR; 13 | DCS; 4 | PHO; 2 | CNS; 15 | MMR; 13 | IRW; 5 | | | 4th | 1900 | |
| 2005 | | | | PHO; 22 | MMR; 20 | PHO; 14 | S99; 4 | IRW; 6 | EVG; 7 | S99; 11 | PPR; 15 | CAL; 14 | DCS; 6 | CTS; 3 | MMR; 5 | | | | 7th | 1626 | |
| 2006 | | | | PHO; 10 | PHO; 32 | S99; 6 | IRW; 3 | SON; 15 | DCS; 10 | IRW; 9 | EVG; 6 | S99; 5 | CAL; 8 | CTS; 14 | AMP; 2 | | | | 7th | 1644 | |
| 2007 | | | | CTS; 17 | PHO | AMP | ELK | IOW | CNS | SON | DCS | IRW | MMP; 5 | EVG | CSR | AMP | | | 37th | 272 | |
