= Hershel McGriff =

American racing driver (born 1927)

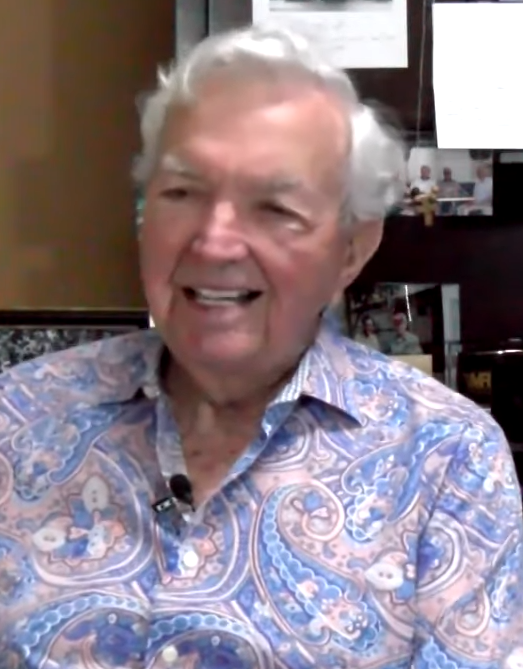
- McGriff in 2023
- Born: Hershel Eldridge McGriff, Sr. December 14, 1927 (age 98); Bridal Veil, Oregon, U.S.
- Achievements: 1986 NASCAR Winston West Series champion Oldest driver to start a NASCAR sanctioned race (90 years, 4 months, 21 days)
- Awards: Named one of NASCAR's 50 Greatest Drivers (1998); West Coast Stock Car Hall of Fame (2002 - Inaugural Class); Motorsports Hall of Fame of America (2006); NASCAR Hall of Fame (2023); Named one of NASCAR's 75 Greatest Drivers (2023)

NASCAR Cup Series career
- 85 races run over 27 years
- Best finish: 6th (1954)
- First race: 1950 Southern 500 (Darlington)
- Last race: 1993 Save Mart Supermarkets 300K (Sears Point)
- First win: 1954 San Mateo 250 (Bay Meadows)
- Last win: 1954 Wilkes 160 (North Wilkesboro)
Wins	Top tens	Poles
4	31	5

ARCA Menards Series career
- 1 race run over 1 year
- First race: 1993 Western Auto Texas Shootout II (Texas World)
Wins	Top tens	Poles
0	1	0

ARCA Menards Series West career
- 271 races run over 42 years
- Best finish: 1st (1986)
- First race: 1954 Race 1 (Oakland)
- Last race: 2018 Port of Tucson Twin 100 #1 (Tucson)
- First win: 1954 Race 7 (San Mateo)
- Last win: 1989 Spears Manufacturing 200 (Mesa Marin)
Wins	Top tens	Poles
34	146	37
- Statistics up to date as of May 24, 2024.

Hershel Eldridge McGriff Sr. (born December 14, 1927) is an American professional stock car racing driver. A long-time competitor in the NASCAR K&N Pro Series West, formerly known as the Winston West Series, he won the series' 1986 championship, and is also a four-time winner in Grand National competition. He most recently drove the No. 04 Toyota Camry for Bill McAnally Racing in 2018.

== Racing career ==
McGriff first raced on September 16, 1945, right after racing resumed in the United States after World War II. He was the winner of the first Carrera Panamericana in 1950, where he met NASCAR founder Bill France Sr. France convinced McGriff to come south and race in NASCAR races at Daytona Beach, the first Southern 500 race at Darlington Raceway, Detroit, and Raleigh.

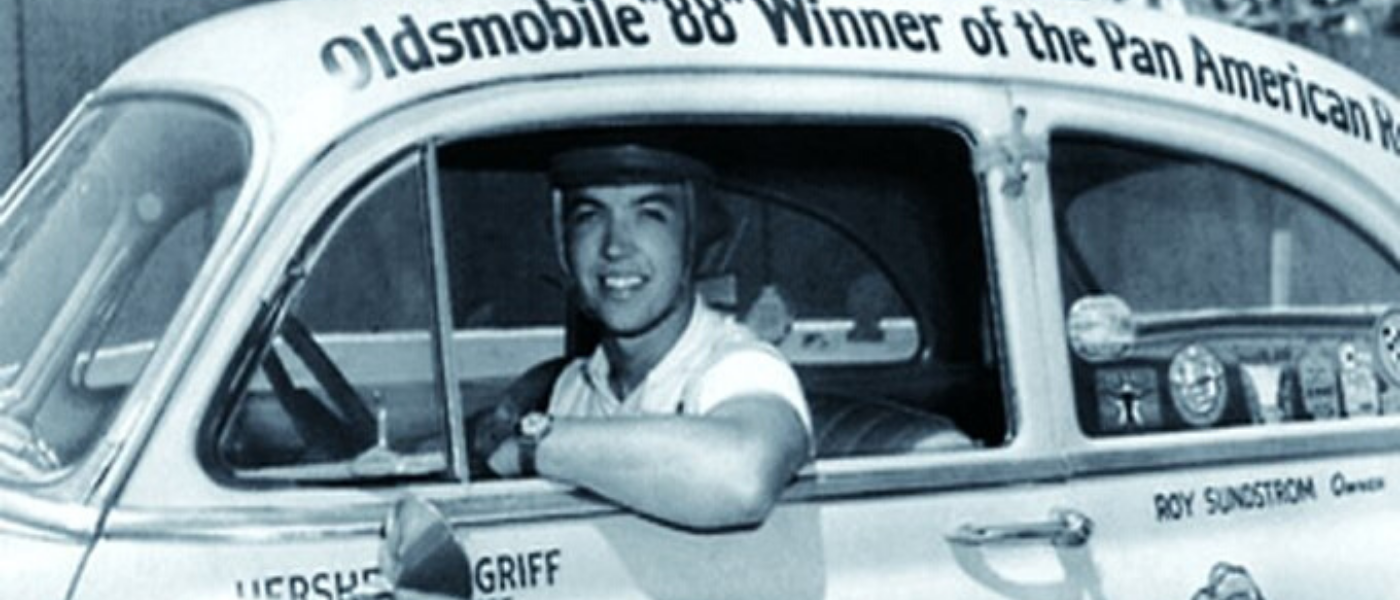
McGriff in his #88 Oldsmobile which he drove in the 1950 La Carrera Panamericana.

France convinced McGriff to race full-time in NASCAR in 1954. He had his four wins that year in the Grand National series, the first coming at Bay Meadows Speedway. He had seventeen top-ten finishes in 24 events and finished sixth in the final points standings. McGriff's average finishing position was higher than points champion Lee Petty.

McGriff had two options to choose from for the 1955 season. He was offered a ride in NASCAR to race for millionaire Carl Kiekhaefer's newly formed team. McGriff decided to return home to the West Coast to be closer to his family and to tend to his growing timber and mill business. Tim Flock drove Kiekhaefer's Chrysler 300 to eighteen victories that season and the season championship.

McGriff returned to racing after an absence of around ten years. He started 41st at Riverside in 1967 and had moved up to second place by the sixth lap. He beat Ron Grable in a photo finish that day.

McGriff became the oldest driver to win a NASCAR feature race when he won the Spears Manufacturing 200, a Winston West Series race, in 1989 at the age of 61. His fourteen wins at the defunct Riverside International Raceway is the most at NASCAR-sanctioned events, and he was chosen as the grand marshal for the final race at the track in 1988.

In November 1996, McGriff made the trip with several NASCAR champions, current Winston Cup, Busch Grand National, and Craftsman Truck Series drivers to Japan's Suzuka Raceway for an exhibition race. He started 26th and finished 25th in what was called the NASCAR Thunder Special Suzuka.

McGriff announced his retirement following the 2002 season.

With later starts in the Camping World/K&N Pro Series East and West, McGriff set and broke his records as the oldest driver in series history.

In 2018, at the age of ninety, McGriff announced plans to run the K&N West races at Tucson Speedway, and upon starting became the oldest person to contest in a race sanctioned by NASCAR.

== Career awards ==
McGriff was inducted in the West Coast Stock Car/Motorsports Hall of Fame in its first class in 2002.

McGriff was inducted into the Motorsports Hall of Fame of America in 2006.

McGriff, who retired from driving at age 74 said, "This is fantastic, getting in the Hall of Fame, but, hey, I might not be through yet. When I turn 80 [in two years], I just might go out to a short track and show the young guys that I can still do it."

In 2023, McGriff was inducted in the NASCAR Hall of Fame alongside 2003 Cup Series Champion, Matt Kenseth, and four-time Cup Series winning crew chief, Kirk Shelmerdine.

== Personal life ==
McGriff's son Hershel Jr. currently races Outlaw Late Models, while his granddaughter Mariah competes in the NASCAR Whelen All-American Series' Super Late Model and Pro Stock divisions. His brother Norman and other son Doug have also competed in NASCAR.

== Motorsports career results ==
=== NASCAR ===
(key) (Bold – Pole position awarded by qualifying time. Italics – Pole position earned by points standings or practice time. * – Most laps led.)

==== Grand National Series ====
NASCAR Grand National Series results
Year	Team	No.	Make	1	2	3	4	5	6	7	8	9	10	11	12	13	14	15	16	17	18	19	20	21	22	23	24	25	26	27	28	29	30	31	32	33	34	35	36	37	38	39	40	41	42	43	44	45	46	47	48	NGNC	Pts	Ref
1950	McGriff Motorsports	52	Olds	DAB	CLT	LAN	MAR	CAN	VER	DSP	MCF	CLT	HBO	DSP	HAM	DAR; 9	LAN	NWS	VER	MAR	WIN	HBO																														NA	0	
1951	McGriff Motorsports		Olds	DAB	CLT	NMO	GAR	HBO	ASF	NWS	MAR	CAN	CLS	CLB	DSP	GAR	GRS; 11	BAI	HEI	AWS	MCF	ALS																														NA	0	
1951	McGriff Motorsports	11	Olds																				MSF; 54	FMS	MOR	ABS																										NA	0	
1951	McGriff Motorsports	77	Olds																								DAR; 4	CLB	CCS	LAN	CLT	DSP	WIL	HBO	TPN	PGS	MAR	OAK; 31	NWS	HMS; 33	JSP	ATL	GAR	NMO								NA	0	
1952	Beryl Jackson	3	Olds	PBS	DAB	JSP	NWS	MAR	CLB	ATL	CCS	LAN	DAR	DSP	CAN	HAY	FMS	HBO	CLT	MSF; 7	NIF; 15	OSW	MON	MOR	PPS	MCF	AWS	DAR	CCS	LAN	DSP	WIL	HBO	MAR	NWS	ATL	PBS															NA	0	
1953	McGriff Motorsports	5	Olds	PBS	DAB	HAR	NWS	CLT	RCH	CCS	LAN	CLB	HCY	MAR	PMS	RSP; 19	LOU; 14	FIF	LAN	TCS	WIL	MCF	PIF	MOR	ATL	RVS	LCF	DAV	HBO	AWS	PAS	HCY	DAR	CCS	LAN	BLF	WIL	NWS	MAR	ATL												51st	322	
1954	Beryl Jackson	98	Olds	PBS	DAB; 12	JSP	ATL	OSP																																												6th	5137	
1954	Beryl Jackson	9	Olds						**OAK**; 20*	NWS	HBO	CCS	LAN	WIL	MAR	SHA																																				6th	5137	
1954	Frank Christian	14	Olds														RSP; 3	CLT; 10	GAR	CLB; 2		HCY; 7	MCF; 5	WGS; 3	**PIF**; 10	AWS; 13	SFS; 3	GRS; 21	MOR; 3	OAK	CLT; 15	**SAN**; 1*	COR; 2	DAR; 45	CCS; 1	**CLT**; 1	LAN; 3	MAS; 9	MAR; 2	**NWS**; 1												6th	5137	
1954	Unknown	8	Jaguar																		LND; 30																															6th	5137	
1971	Beryl Jackson	04	Plymouth	RSD; 12	DAY	DAY	DAY																				RSD; 21	HOU	GPS	DAY	BRI	AST	ISP	TRN	NSV	ATL	BGS	ONA	MCH	TAL	CLB	HCY	DAR	MAR	CLT	DOV	CAR	MGR	RCH	NWS	TWS	NA	0	
1971	Robert Koehler	41	Plymouth					ONT; 28	RCH	CAR	HCY	BRI	ATL	CLB	GPS	SMR	NWS	MAR	DAR	SBO	TAL	ASH	KPT	CLT	DOV	MCH																										NA	0	

==== Winston Cup Series ====
NASCAR Winston Cup Series results
Year	Team	No.	Make	1	2	3	4	5	6	7	8	9	10	11	12	13	14	15	16	17	18	19	20	21	22	23	24	25	26	27	28	29	30	31	NWCC	Pts	Ref
1972	Beryl Jackson	04	Plymouth	RSD; 5	DAY	RCH												RSD; 12	TWS	DAY	BRI	TRN	ATL	TAL	MCH	NSV	DAR	RCH	DOV	MAR	NWS	CLT	CAR	TWS; 5	45th	1199.75	
1972	Beryl Jackson	4W	Plymouth				ONT; 6	CAR	ATL	BRI	DAR	NWS	MAR	TAL	CLT	DOV	MCH																		45th	1199.75	
1973	Beryl Jackson	04	Plymouth	RSD; 23	DAY; 5	RCH	CAR	BRI	ATL	NWS	DAR	MAR	TAL	NSV	CLT	DOV	TWS	RSD; 7	MCH	DAY	BRI	ATL	TAL	NSV	DAR	RCH	DOV	NWS	MAR	CLT	CAR				51st	-	
1974	Petty Enterprises	04	Dodge	RSD; 10	DAY; 39	RCH	CAR; 32	BRI	ATL	DAR	NWS	MAR	TAL; 12	NSV	DOV	CLT																			50th	20.34	
1974	Midgley Racing	26W	Chevy														RSD; 35	MCH	DAY	BRI	NSV	ATL	POC	TAL	MCH	DAR	RCH	DOV	NWS	MAR	CLT	CAR	ONT		50th	20.34	
1975	Midgley Racing	29W	Chevy	RSD; 10																															69th	205	
1975	Friez Enterprises	69	Chevy		DAY; 30	RCH	CAR	BRI	ATL	NWS	DAR	MAR	TAL	NSV	DOV	CLT																			69th	205	
1975	Midgley Racing	29	Chevy														RSD; 19	MCH	DAY	NSV	POC	TAL	MCH	DAR	DOV	NWS	MAR								69th	205	
1975	Harris Racing	82	Dodge																									CLT; 11	RCH	CAR	BRI	ATL			69th	205	
1975	Friez Enterprises	26	Chevy																														ONT; 31		69th	205	
1976	McGriff Motorsports	50	Chevy	RSD; 30	DAY	CAR	RCH	BRI	ATL	NWS	DAR	MAR	TAL	NSV	DOV	CLT	RSD	MCH	DAY	NSV	POC	TAL	MCH	BRI	DAR	RCH	DOV	MAR	NWS	CLT	CAR	ATL			102nd	73	
1976	McGriff Motorsports	1	Chevy																														ONT; 32		102nd	73	
1977	McGriff Motorsports	69	Chevy	RSD; 7																															67th	207	
1977	Puro Racing	90	Ford		DAY; DNQ	RCH	CAR	ATL	NWS	DAR	BRI	MAR	TAL	NSV	DOV	CLT																			67th	207	
1977	McGriff Motorsports	4	Chevy														RSD; 34	MCH	DAY	NSV	POC	TAL	MCH	BRI	DAR	RCH	DOV	MAR	NWS	CLT	CAR	ATL	ONT		67th	207	
1978	Jefferson Racing	95	Ford	RSD; 6	DAY	RCH	CAR	ATL	BRI	DAR	NWS	MAR	TAL	DOV	CLT	NSV																			84th	112	
1978	McGriff Motorsports	48	Chevy														RSD; 17	MCH	DAY	NSV	POC	TAL	MCH	BRI	DAR	RCH	DOV	MAR	NWS	CLT	CAR	ATL	ONT		84th	112	
1979	Midgley Racing	29	Chevy	RSD	DAY	CAR	RCH	ATL	NWS	BRI	DAR	MAR	TAL	NSV	DOV	CLT	TWS	RSD	MCH	DAY	NSV	POC	TAL	MCH	BRI	DAR	RCH	DOV	MAR	CLT	NWS	CAR	ATL	ONT; DNQ	NA	-	
1980	Robert Palmer	93	Dodge	RSD; 26	DAY	RCH	CAR	ATL	BRI	DAR	NWS	MAR	TAL	NSV	DOV	CLT	TWS																		59th	270	
1980	Midgley Racing	29	Chevy															RSD; 24	MCH	DAY	NSV	POC	TAL	MCH	BRI	DAR	RCH	DOV	NWS	MAR	CLT	CAR	ATL		59th	270	
1980	Kieper Racing	98	Chevy																															ONT; 23	59th	270	
1981	Gerald Craker	01	Dodge	RSD; 33	DAY	RCH	CAR	ATL	BRI	NWS	DAR	MAR	TAL	NSV	DOV	CLT	TWS																		66th	206	
1981	Gerald Craker	01	Buick															RSD; 25	MCH	DAY	NSV	POC	TAL	MCH	BRI	DAR	RCH	DOV	MAR	NWS	CLT	CAR	ATL	RSD; 38	66th	206	
1982	Gary Smith	04	Buick	DAY	RCH	BRI	ATL	CAR	DAR	NWS	MAR	TAL	NSV	DOV	CLT	POC	RSD; 33	MCH	DAY	NSV	POC	TAL	MCH	BRI	DAR	RCH	DOV	NWS	CLT	MAR	CAR	ATL	RSD; 28		73rd	143	
1983	Gary Smith	04	Buick	DAY	RCH	CAR	ATL	DAR	NWS	MAR	TAL	NSV	DOV	BRI	CLT	RSD; 26	POC	MCH	DAY	NSV	POC	TAL	MCH	BRI	DAR	RCH	DOV	MAR	NWS	CLT	CAR	ATL	RSD; 8		53rd	227	
1984	Gary Smith	04	Pontiac	DAY	RCH	CAR	ATL	BRI	NWS	DAR	MAR	TAL	NSV	DOV	CLT	RSD; 35	POC	MCH	DAY	NSV	POC	TAL	MCH	BRI	DAR	RCH	DOV	MAR	CLT	NWS	CAR	ATL	RSD; 9		67th	-	
1985	Gary Smith	04	Pontiac	DAY	RCH	CAR	ATL	BRI	DAR	NWS	MAR	TAL	DOV	CLT	RSD; 29	POC	MCH	DAY	POC	TAL	MCH	BRI	DAR	RCH	DOV	MAR	NWS	CLT	CAR	ATL	RSD; 26				66th	161	
1986	Gary Smith	04	Pontiac	DAY	RCH	CAR	ATL	BRI	DAR	NWS	MAR	TAL	DOV	CLT	RSD; 28	POC	MCH	DAY	POC	TAL	GLN	MCH	BRI	DAR	RCH	DOV	MAR	NWS	CLT	CAR	ATL	RSD; 26			77th	164	
1987	Gary Smith	04	Pontiac	DAY	CAR	RCH	ATL	DAR	NWS	BRI	MAR	TAL	CLT	DOV	POC	RSD; 12	MCH	DAY	POC	TAL	GLN	MCH	BRI	DAR	RCH	DOV	MAR	NWS	CLT	CAR	RSD; 42	ATL			67th	164	
1988	McGriff Motorsports	04	Pontiac	DAY	RCH	CAR	ATL	DAR	BRI	NWS	MAR	TAL	CLT	DOV	RSD; 36	POC	MCH	DAY	POC	TAL	GLN; 25	MCH	BRI	DAR; DNQ	RCH	DOV	MAR	CLT	NWS	CAR	PHO; 34	ATL			53rd	204	
1989	McGriff Motorsports	04	Pontiac	DAY	CAR	ATL	RCH	DAR	BRI	NWS	MAR	TAL	CLT	DOV	SON; 14	POC	MCH	DAY	POC	TAL	GLN	MCH	BRI	DAR	RCH	DOV	MAR	CLT	NWS	CAR	PHO; DNQ	ATL			65th	-	
1990	Bob Lipseia	04	Pontiac	DAY	RCH	CAR	ATL	DAR	BRI	NWS	MAR	TAL	CLT	DOV	SON; 44	POC	MCH	DAY	POC	TAL	GLN	MCH	BRI	DAR	RCH	DOV	MAR	NWS	CLT	CAR	PHO; DNQ	ATL			105th	31	
1991	Bob Lipseia	04	Pontiac	DAY	RCH	CAR	ATL	DAR	BRI	NWS	MAR	TAL	CLT	DOV	SON; 32	POC	MCH	DAY	POC	TAL	GLN	MCH	BRI	DAR	RCH	DOV	MAR	NWS	CLT	CAR	PHO; 27	ATL			60th	149	
1992	TTC Motrosports Inc.	50	Chevy	DAY	CAR	RCH	ATL	DAR	BRI	NWS	MAR	TAL	CLT	DOV	SON; 42	POC	MCH	DAY	POC	TAL	GLN	MCH	BRI	DAR	RCH	DOV	MAR	NWS	CLT	CAR	PHO	ATL			97th	37	
1993	TTC Motrosports Inc.	04	Chevy	DAY	CAR	RCH	ATL	DAR	BRI	NWS	MAR	TAL	SON; 43	CLT	DOV	POC	MCH	DAY	NHA	POC	TAL	GLN	MCH	BRI	DAR	RCH	DOV	MAR	NWS	CLT	CAR	PHO	ATL		95th	34	
1994	Breezly Motorsports	04W	Ford	DAY	CAR	RCH	ATL	DAR	BRI	NWS	MAR	TAL	SON	CLT	DOV	POC	MCH	DAY	NHA	POC	TAL	IND; DNQ	GLN	MCH	BRI	DAR	RCH	DOV	MAR	NWS	CLT	CAR	PHO	ATL	NA	-	

===== Daytona 500 =====
Year	Team	Manufacturer	Start	Finish
1973	Beryl Jackson	Plymouth	6	5
1974	Petty Enterprises	Dodge	8	39
1975	Friez Enterprises	Chevy	38	30
1977	Puro Racing	Ford	DNQ	

==== K&N Pro Series West ====
NASCAR K&N Pro Series West results
Year	Team	No.	Make	1	2	3	4	5	6	7	8	9	10	11	12	13	14	15	16	17	18	19	20	21	22	23	24	25	26	27	28	29	30	Pos.	Pts	Ref
1954	Beryl Jackson	9	Olds	**OAK**; 20*	GAR	HMS	BST	OAK	VSP																									15th	548	
1954	Frank Christian	14	Olds							**SAN**; 1*	BST	CAP																						15th	548	
1965	Ted Pollock	77	Dodge	CHS	RSD	SJS	ASP	POR; 3																										NA	0	
1965	Ted Pollock	77N	Dodge						EVG; 14	CHS	POR; 3	ASP	POR	ASP	ASP	CSF; 19	ASP																	NA	0	
1966	Ted Pollock	77N	Dodge	RSD	S99	ASP	ASP	DCS; 15	POR; 14	ASP	OSS	VSP	S99	ASP	AMP	**POR**; 2*		CSF; 19																17th	702	
1966	Ted Pollock	77	Dodge														SGB; 17																	17th	702	
1967	Ted Pollock	77	Dodge	AMP	SGB	RSD	CSP	SHA	SAL; 14	POR; 19	ASP	SGB	OSS	ASP	ACF; 9	MED; 11	SAL; 5	JBA; 3	YAK; 1*	EVG; 5	ASP	CSP												17th	1046	
1968	Ted Pollock	77	Dodge	RSD	ASP	FRE	VSP	ASP	AMP	DCS	POR; 15	EVG	EUG	MED	OSS	TCR	YAK	EVG	RAS	BKS; 16	S99; 12	CSP	SGS											NA	0	
1969	Ted Pollock	77	Chevy	RSD	CSF	SGB	SON	EVG	TCR	YAK	DCS	SAL	JBA	OSS	SGS	SON; 23	YAK	EVG	CPR															NA	0	
1969	Elder Racing	196	Dodge																	POR; 16	SMS	SGB	TWS											NA	0	
1970	Ted Pollock	77	Chevy	RSD	ASP	SGB	CSF	RSD	YAK; 16	EVG; 11	JBA; 3	CRS	OSS	SGS	MED; 1	SAL; 2	SPS	TCR	WSP	S99	ASP	SGB												NA	0	
1971	Beryl Jackson	04	Plymouth	RSD; 12							RSD; 21	SAL; 1*	SPS; 5	SKA; 1*	USP; 2	**POR**; 1*	LSP; 1*	MED; 5	**DCS**; 1	CRS	OSS	SGS	BKS	**CSP**; 2	EVG; 11	IFS; 1*	YAK; 14	SGB	TWS					9th	843	
1971	Robert Koehler	41	Plymouth		ONT; 28	OSS	SJS	CRS	S99	ASP																								9th	843	
1972	Beryl Jackson	04	Plymouth	RSD; 5		SJS; 17	S99; 2	**SMN**; 8	**TCR**; 6*	**YAK**; 1*	EVG; 17	RSD; 12	**MED**; 1*	**POR**; 1*	**IFS**; 1	MER; 2	**SPS**; 2	LSP; 1*	WSP; 2	SKA; 1	**RAS**; 1*	CRS; 1	OSS; 1*	SGS; 1*	**CSP**; 2	**BKS**; 1*	**EVG**; 22	USP; 4	YAK; 4	POR; 1*	ASP; 8	WCR; 2	**SMN**; 3	2nd	2742	
1972	Beryl Jackson	4W	Plymouth		ONT; 6																													2nd	2742	
1973	Beryl Jackson	04	Plymouth	AMP; 10	MAD	S99	AUR	KFS		USP; 15	**POR**; 1	SPS	WER	SGS	CAJ	OSS	CSP	BKS	**LAG**; 3*	EVG; Wth	WSP	YAK; 19	**POR**; 1*	AMP; 13										18th	612	
1973	Beryl Jackson	04	Dodge						CBS; 2																									18th	612	
1974	Petty Enterprises	04	Dodge	RSD; 10	AMP	S99	MSP	COR	SBP	ASP																								39th	225.75	
1974	Midgley Racing	26W	Chevy								RSD; 35	WER	WSP	SPS	STA	USP																		39th	225.75	
1974	McGriff Motorsports	04	Plymouth														POR; 4	MED	EUG; 4	CBS; 6	CAJ	CRS	ASP	AMP	CSP	EVG	YAK	POR	SGB	ASP	ONT			39th	225.75	
1975	Midgley Racing	29	Chevy	RSD; 10	LAG	MSP	ASP	RSD; 19	ASP	USP	POR	EVG	SMS	CRS	CSP	ASP	EVG; 2	YAK	POR	MSP														30th	232.75	
1975	Friez Enterprises	26	Chevy																		ONT; 31													30th	232.75	
1976	McGriff Motorsports	50	Chevy	RSD; 30	RSD	EVG	WSP	USP	POR	SHA	SGS	EVG	YAK	POR	LAG																			NA	0	
1976	McGriff Motorsports	1	Chevy													ONT; 32																		NA	0	
1977	McGriff Motorsports	69	Chevy	RSD; 7																														13th	693.25	
1977	McGriff Motorsports	4	Chevy		LAG; 5	ONT; 4	SJS; 18	MMR; 14	ASP; 15	RSD; 34	SGS	YAK; 2	EVG; 2	WSP	USP	POR; 22	AAS	CRS	ASP	SHA	POR	ONT	PHO											13th	693.25	
1978	Ted Armstrong	43	Chevy	RSD	AAS	S99	SHA	PET	MMR	RSD	IFS	YAK	WSP	LSP	EVG	POR	CRS	ASP	SON; 15	SHA	CBS	YAK	OSS	ONT	PHO									NA	0	
1979	Jefferson Racing	95	Ford	RSD	MMR	RSD	EVG	YAK	POR; 8	AAS	SHA	CRS	SON	EVG	SPO	POR	ASP																	NA	0	
1979	Midgley Racing	29	Chevy															ONT; DNQ	PHO															NA	0	
1980	Robert Palmer	93	Dodge	RSD; 26	ONT; 3							MMR; 4		PHO; 4																				5th	434	
1980	Midgley Racing	29	Pontiac			S99; 5		LAG; 26	EVG; 26	POR; 21																								5th	434	
1980	Midgley Racing	29	Chevy				RSD; 24																											5th	434	
1980	Midgley Racing	20	Pontiac								SON; 22																							5th	434	
1980	Kieper Racing	98	Chevy										ONT; 23																					5th	434	
1981	Gerald Craker	01	Dodge	RSD; 33																														6th	581	
1981	Gerald Craker	01	Buick		S99; 2	AAS; 19	MMR; 8	RSD; 25	LAG; 16	POR; 3	WSP; 3	EVG; 5	SHA; 8	**RSD**; 16	SON; 16	RSD; 38	PHO; 23																	6th	581	
1982	Gary Smith	04	Buick	MMR; 3	S99; 8	AAS; 14	RSD; 33	POR; 19	WSP	SHA	EVG; 4	SON; 20	**CDR**; 10	RSD; 20*	RSD; 28	PHO; 3																		10th	438	
1983	Gary Smith	04	Buick	S99; 6	SON; 1*	RSD; 26	YAK; 21	EVG; 8	SHA; 11	RSD; 1*	CPL; 24	RSD; 8	PHO; 10																					3rd	438	
1984	Gary Smith	04	Pontiac	RSD; 35	YAK; 8	**SIR**; 11	POR; 18	**EVG**; 18	SHA	WSR; 5	**SON**; 7	MMR; 20	RSD; 9	PHO; 10																				10th	410	
1985	Gary Smith	04	Pontiac	**SON**; 1*	SHA; 2	RSD; 29	MMR; 2*	**SIR**; 19	POR; 3*	STA; 6	**YAK**; 1*	EVG; 2	WSR; 1*	**MMR**; 21	RSD; 26																			2nd	565	
1986	Gary Smith	04	Pontiac	**SON**; 6	RSD; 28	EVG; 3	RCS; 17	TAC; 1	PIR; 1*	WSR; 1*	RSD; 26																							1st	408	
1987	Gary Smith	04	Pontiac	SON; 1*	RSD; 12	SGP; 5	EVG; 17	**POR**; 20	TAC; 9	MMR; 1*	RSD; 42																							2nd	362	
1988	McGriff Motorsports	04	Pontiac	SON; 27	MMR; 6	RSD; 36	SGP; 16	POR; 2*	EVG; 13	MMR; 4	PHO; 34																							5th	328	
1989	McGriff Motorsports	04	Pontiac	MAD; 3	MMR; 1	**RAS**; 7*	SON; 14	**POR**; 17	TCR; 16	EVG; 3	MMR; 9	**SGS**; 2	SON; 16	PHO; DNQ																				4th	1666	
1990	Bob Lipseia	04	Pontiac	MMR; 8	SON; 44	SGS; 5	POR; 6	EVG; 23	RAS	TCR	MMR	PHO; DNQ																						12th	814	
1991	Bob Lipseia	04	Pontiac	EVG; 22	MMR; 3	SON; 32	SGS; 4	POR; 8	EVG; 10	SSS; 4	MMR; 6	PHO; 27																						4th	1353	
1992	TTC Motrosports Inc.	50	Chevy	MMR; 15	SGS	SON; 42	SHA	**POR**; 7	EVG; 24	SSS; 3	CAJ	TWS	MMR; 8	PHO																				13th	802	
1993	TTC Motrosports Inc.	04	Chevy	TWS; 4	**MMR**; 2	SGS; 4	SON; 43	TUS; 8	SHA; 4	EVG; 5	POR; 6	CBS	SSS	CAJ	TCR	MMR	PHO																	9th	1269	
1994	Tom Gloy Racing	94	Ford	MMR; 12																														24th	625	
1994	McGriff Motorsports	04	Pontiac		TUS; 15	SON	SGS	YAK	MMR	POR; 9																								24th	625	
1994	Breezly Motorsports	04	Ford								IND; DNQ	CAJ	TCR	LVS	MMR	PHO	TUS																	24th	625	
1995	Kieper Racing	98	Chevy	TUS	MMR	SON	CNS	MMR	POR	SGS	TUS	AMP	MAD	POR; 3	LVS	SON	MMR	PHO																41st	170	
1996	Unknown	25	Chevy	TUS	AMP	MMR	SON	MAD	POR	TUS	EVG	CNS	MAD	MMR	SON	MMR	PHO	LVS; 21																65th	100	
1998	Tex Powell	72	Chevy	TUS	LVS	PHO	CAL	HPT; 23	MMR	AMP	POR	CAL	PPR; 32	EVG	SON; 7	MMR	LVS; 9																	33rd	450	
2000	Bill McAnally Racing	04	Chevy	PHO	MMR	LVS	CAL	LAG	IRW	POR; 14	EVG	IRW	RMR	MMR	IRW																			57th	121	
2001	Bill McAnally Racing	04	Chevy	PHO; 14	LVS; 18	TUS; 5	MMR; 16	CAL; 28	IRW; 13	LAG; 9	KAN; 14	EVG; 6	CNS; 9	IRW; 17	RMR; 8	LVS; 21	IRW; 12																	13th	1731	
2002	McGriff Motorsports	04	Chevy	PHO; 7	LVS; 21	CAL; 22	KAN	EVG	IRW	S99	RMR	DCS	LVS																					27th	343	
2009	McGriff Motorsports	04	Chevy	CTS	AAS	PHO	MAD	IOW	DCS	SON; DNQ	IRW	PIR; 13	MMP; 19	CNS	IOW	AAS																		35th	267	
2010	McGriff Motorsports	04	Chevy	AAS	PHO	IOW	DCS	SON	IRW	PIR; 17	MRP	CNS	MMP; 17	AAS	PHO																			45th	224	
2011	McGriff Motorsports	04	Chevy	PHO	AAS	MMP; 16	IOW	LVS	SON; 20	IRW	EVG	PIR; 14	CNS	MRP	SPO	AAS	PHO																	41st	339	
2012	McGriff Motorsports	04	Chevy	PHO	LHC	MMP	S99	IOW	BIR	LVS	SON; 18	EVG	CNS	IOW	PIR	SMP	AAS	PHO																73rd	26	
2018	Bill McAnally Racing	04	Toyota	KCR	TUS; 18	TUS; Wth	OSS	CNS	SON	DCS	IOW	EVG	GTW	LVS	MER	AAS	KCR																	28th	52	

=== ARCA Hooters SuperCar Series ===
(key) (Bold – Pole position awarded by qualifying time. Italics – Pole position earned by points standings or practice time. * – Most laps led.)

ARCA Hooters SuperCar Series results
Year	Team	No.	Make	1	2	3	4	5	6	7	8	9	10	11	12	13	14	15	16	17	18	19	AHSS	Pts	Ref
1993	TTC Motrosports Inc.	04W	Chevy	DAY	FIF	TWS; 4	TAL	KIL	CMS	FRS	TOL	POC	MCH	FRS	POC	KIL	ISF	DSF	TOL	SLM	WIN	ATL	NA	0	

=== 24 Hours of Le Mans results ===
24 Hours of Le Mans results
Year	Team	Co-Drivers	Car	Class	Laps	Pos.	Class Pos.
1976	(United States) NASCAR – McGriff	(United States) Doug McGriff	Dodge Charger	NASCAR	2	DNF	DNF
1982	(United States) Stratagraph Inc.	(United States) Dick Brooks (United States) Tom Williams	Chevrolet Camaro	IMSA; GTO	141	NC	NC

Sporting positions
Preceded by Jim Robinson	NASCAR Winston West Series champion 1986	Succeeded by Chad Little
