= Carl Adams (racing driver) =

American racing driver (born 1942)

- Born: August 3, 1942 (age 84)

NASCAR Cup Series career
- 28 races run over 4 years
- Best finish: 23rd - 1975
- First race: 1972 Miller High Life 500 (Ontario Motor Speedway)
- Last race: 1975 Los Angeles Times 500 (Ontario Motor Speedway)
Wins	Top tens	Poles
0	5	0

Carl Adams (born August 3, 1942) is a former NASCAR driver from National City, California. He made 28 Cup Series starts in his career. He earned five top-ten finishes and had a best effort of 23rd in the point standings in 1975.

Adams began racing at Cajon Speedway near San Diego, California in 1962; eventually racing concurrently in both Super Stocks and the open wheel Modified Sportsman classes and winning feature events in both before moving into CRA Sprint Cars.

Additionally, Adams had great success racing Super Modifieds on a winter tour of ovals in South Africa. Adams won three CRA Sprint Car features before turning to the NASCAR Grand National West division in 1972. He was named GNW rookie of the year for 1972. Adams competed on the GNW circuit in 1973 before heading off to the premier series in 1974 and 1975.

== Racing career results ==
=== NASCAR Winston Cup Series ===
NASCAR Winston Cup Series results
Year	Owner/Team	No.	Make	1	2	3	4	5	6	7	8	9	10	11	12	13	14	15	16	17	18	19	20	21	22	23	24	25	26	27	28	29	30	31	NWCC	Pts	Ref
1972	Paul Burchard	39W	Ford				ONT 30																												75th	530	
1972	Paul Burchard	09W	Ford															RIV 7																	75th	530	
1973	Richard Mummert	9	Ford	RIV 13														RIV 22																	69th	N/A	
1974	Richard Mummert	56	Ford	RIV 13					ATL 18				TAL 22																						51st	19.2	
1974	Richard Mummert	56W	Ford																														ONT 40		51st	19.2	
1974	Dick Mummert	56	Ford							DAR DNQ																									51st	19.2	
1975	Richard Mummert	56	Ford	RIV 34																															23rd	2182	
1975	Ray Mommery	65	Ford		DAY DNQ																														23rd	2182	
1975	Richard Mummert	65	Ford				ROC 13		ATL 16	NWI 18	DAR 12	MAR 12	TAL 44				RIV 23	MCH 21	DAY 9	NSH 8	POC 6	TAL 23	MCH 29			NWI 20	MAR 7		RCH 11		BRI 14	ATL 16	ONT 28		23rd	2182	
1975	Bill Hollar	29	Chevrolet																					DAR DNQ											23rd	2182	
