= Harry Jefferson (racing driver) =

American racing driver (1946–2021)

- Born: November 2, 1946; Naches, Washington, United States
- Died: August 23, 2021 (aged 74); Seattle, Washington, United States
- Cause of death: Lung cancer, Autoimmune encephalitis

NASCAR Cup Series career
- 12 races run over 5 years
- Best finish: 45th (1975)
- First race: 1973 Winston Western 500 (Riverside)
- Last race: 1977 Los Angeles Times 500 (Ontario)
Wins	Top tens	Poles
0	3	0

ARCA Menards Series West career
- 31 races run over 9 years
- Best finish: 14th (1976)
- First race: 1970 Race 6 (Yakima)
- Last race: 1979 Evergreen Winston 100 (Evergreen)
- First win: 1974 Evergreen 200 (Evergreen)
- Last win: 1977 Winston Evergreen 150 (Evergreen)
Wins	Top tens	Poles
6	16	0
- Statistics up to date as of February 21, 2025.

Harry Jefferson (November 2, 1946 – August 23, 2021) was an American professional stock car racing driver. He competed in the NASCAR Winston Cup Series from 1973 to 1977 and NASCAR Winston West Series from 1970 to 1979.

== Career ==
In addition to his Cup Series career, Jefferson also raced in the Winston West Series in a 1973 Mercury Cougar vehicle. That vehicle would eventually be refurbished into a 1979 Ford Granada and driven by NASCAR legends such as Derrike Cope, David Pearson, and Bobby Allison. Jefferson won six Winston West races, winning two races in each 1974, 1976, and 1977. At the Winston Cup level, Jefferson completed 1739 laps - the equivalent of 3,189.2 miles (5,132.5 km). He earned a grand total of $20,268 in total prize winnings ($107,684.18 when adjusted for inflation) after starting an average of 18th place and finishing an average of 24th place. His only DNQs were at the 1972 Miller High Life 500 and at the 1988 Checker 500.

Jefferson also enjoyed a very successful career in the late model Sportsman series in the Pacific Northwest.

== Death ==
Jefferson died on August 23, 2021, in Seattle, Washington at the age of 74 after a short illness, suffering from lung cancer and autoimmune encephalitis.
