= Kenny Brightbill =

American racing driver

- Born: January 20, 1948 (age 78) Sinking Spring, Pennsylvania, U.S.
- Retired: 2014

Modified racing career
- Debut season: 1967
- Car number: 19
- Championships: 11
- Wins: 426

Previous series
- 1982-1987 Wins 2013-2014 Wins: Late Model; 13; SpeedSTR; 2

Championship titles
- 1972 New York State Fair Champion

Awards
- National Dirt Late Model Hall of Fame; Eastern Motorsports Press Association Hall of Fame; Reading Fairgrounds Historical Society Home of Champions Hall of Fame; Northeast Dirt Modified Hall of Fame; York Country Racing Club Hall of Fame; New York State Stock Car Association Hall of Fame; 1975 EMPA Al Holbert National Driver of the Year
- Achievements: 1974, 1976, 1977, 1978 Reading Fairgrounds Speedway Track Champion; 1988 Mr. Dirt Track USA; 1992 Big Diamond Raceway 358-modified Track Champion

NASCAR Cup Series career
- 6 races run over 4 years
- Best finish: 7th (1975)
- First race: 1974 Purolator 500 (Pocono)
- Last race: 1978 Coca-Cola 500 (Pocono)
Wins	Top tens	Poles
0	3	0

Kenny Brightbill (born January 20, 1948), nicknamed "the Shillington Slingshot" and "Mr. Excitement" is an American former NASCAR and professional dirt modified driver from Sinking Spring, Pennsylvania. He has won 441 career professional races. He is the all time wins leader of Reading Fairground Speedway with 135 career wins. He is also the all time wins leader at Susquehanna Speedway with 37 wins. Brightbill has won many of the most noted races for dirt track modifieds in the Northeastern United States, most notably 1988 Syracuse Miller High Life 300.

== Early life ==
Brightbill was born in Reading Pennsylvania, the son of Helen Irene (Long) and Elmer Samuel Brightbill. He began his racing career in 1967 at the age of 19, at that time the local speedway had the minimum racing age of 21 years old. Kenny could not wait 2 more years to get on the track so he told the race officials he was in fact 21. In honor of his stretch of the truth he choose to make his race number (#19) to honor his real age at the time of 19.

== Racing career ==
Although Brightbill scored over 441 wins at 41 different tracks all over the world, Brightbill's major notoriety stems from his popularity and dominance at Reading Fairgrounds Speedway. From his first Reading victory April 17, 1970 through June 24, 1979, second to last race at the Fairgrounds, Brightbill won 135 times. In that nine year period, there were 480 feature races. Brightbill’s Reading record: 135 wins, 303 top-five finishes, 352 top-tens, and four championships earned Brightbill a large number of fans in and around Berks County. Additionally he won the Eastern States 200 in 1980, Super DIRT Week Syracuse 200 in 1988, four track championships and 43 wins at East Windsor Race Track, 37 wins at Susquehanna Speedway, 30 victories and 2 titles at Bridgeport Speedway, 29 wins at New Egypt Speedway, eight wins at Grandview Speedway and the 1978 championship at Flemington Speedway. Kenny also gave dirt late model racing a try, registering 13 victories.

Brightbill has been inducted into the National Dirt Late Model Hall of Fame, the New York State Stock Car Association Hall of Fame, the Eastern Motorsports Press Association Hall of Fame, the Reading Fairgrounds Speedway Historical Society Home of Champions Hall of Fame the Northeast Dirt Modified Hall of Fame, and the YCRC Hall of Fame,

== NASCAR ==
Brightbill raced in six NASCAR Winston Cup Series races in his career, finishing with three top-tens. His first race came in 1974 at Pocono Raceway. It was a great achievement for the rookie NASCAR driver, who almost finished the race but ended up falling fall laps short to record a tenth-place finish. He then raced at Dover International Speedway later that season and finished eighth. He only had one NASCAR start in 1975, once again at Dover, racing for Donlavey Racing. It was the best day of Brightbill's NASCAR career, as he started 13th, finished all but 20 laps, and recorded his NASCAR best seventh-place finish. Brightbill did not race another NASCAR race until 1977, making two starts for car owner Jim Makar. He proved his racing skills were still superior, finishing every lap but the final six to end with a 12th place finish. He then raced in Dover, not fairing as well with a 40th place finish. His last career NASCAR race was in 1978 at Pocono Raceway. Brightbill started 26th in the field of 40, and ended the race finishing 23rd.

== Motorsports career results ==
=== NASCAR ===
(key) (Bold – Pole position awarded by qualifying time. Italics – Pole position earned by points standings or practice time. * – Most laps led.)

==== Winston Cup Series ====
NASCAR Winston Cup Series results
Year	Team	No.	Make	1	2	3	4	5	6	7	8	9	10	11	12	13	14	15	16	17	18	19	20	21	22	23	24	25	26	27	28	29	30	NWCC	Pts	Ref
1974	Ballard Racing	30	Chevy	RSD	DAY	RCH	CAR	BRI	ATL	DAR	NWS	MAR	TAL	NSV	DOV	CLT	RSD	MCH	DAY	BRI	NSV	ATL	POC; 10	TAL	MCH	DAR	RCH							106th	1.32	
1974	Norris Reed	83	Chevy																									DOV; 8	NWS	MAR	CLT	CAR	ONT	106th	1.32	
1975	Donlavey Racing	93	Ford	RSD	DAY	RCH	CAR	BRI	ATL	NWS	DAR	MAR	TAL	NSV	DOV; 7	CLT	RSD	MCH	DAY	NSV	POC	TAL	MCH	DAR	DOV	NWS	MAR	CLT	RCH	CAR	BRI	ATL	ONT	76th	146	
1977	Makar Enterprises	84	Mercury	RSD	DAY	RCH	CAR	ATL	NWS	DAR	BRI	MAR	TAL	NSV	DOV	CLT	RSD	MCH	DAY	NSV	POC; 12	TAL	MCH	BRI	DAR	RCH	DOV; 40	MAR	NWS	CLT	CAR	ATL	ONT	78th	170	
1978	Makar Enterprises	84	Mercury	RSD	DAY	RCH	CAR	ATL	BRI	DAR	NWS	MAR	TAL	DOV	CLT	NSV	RSD	MCH	DAY	NSV	POC; 23	TAL	MCH	BRI	DAR	RCH	DOV	MAR	NWS	CLT	CAR	ATL	ONT	NA	-	

=== Career win list ===
Win of year	Date	Track	Laps	Class	Car owner / No.	Career win number
1970
1	1970-04-17	Reading	35	Modified	Brightbill / 19	1
2	1970-08-09	Reading	35	Modified	Wertz / 57	2
3	1970-10-03	Reading	25	Modified	Wertz / 57	3
1971
1	1971-03-27	Reading	35	Modified	Wertz / 57	4
2	1971-04-16	Reading	35	Modified	Wertz / 57	5
3	1971-06-18	Reading	35	Modified	Wertz / 57	6
4	1971-07-02	Reading	50	Modified	Wertz / 57	7
5	1971-09-18	Penn National	35	Modified	Wertz / 57	8
6	1971-10-01	Reading	25	Modified	Wertz / 57	9
1972
1	1972-05-05	Reading	35	Modified	Wertz / 57	10
2	1972-06-09	Reading	35	Modified	Wertz / 57	11
3	1972-07-01	Reading	35	Modified	Wertz / 57	12
4	1972-07-28	Reading	35	Modified	Wertz / 57	13
5	1972-08-11	Reading	35	Modified	Wertz / 57	14
6	1972-08-12	Reading	35	Modified	Wertz / 57	15
7	1972-08-19	Reading	25	Modified	Wertz / 57	16
8	1972-08-25	Reading	35	Modified	Wertz / 57	17
9	1972-09-03	NYS Fairgrounds	30	Modified	Wertz / 57	18
10	1972-09-03	Rolling Wheels	?	Modified	Wertz / 57	19
11	1972-09-24	Reading	35	Modified	Wertz / 57	20
12	1972-10-22	Bridgeport	30	Modified	Wertz / 57	21
13	1972-11-05	Bridgeport	25	Modified	Wertz / 57	22
14	1972-11-12	Bridgeport	30	Modified	Wertz / 57	23
1973
1	1973-03-18	Reading	35	Modified	Brightbill / 19	24
2	1973-04-15	Bridgeport	25	Modified	Brightbill / 19	25
3	1973-04-15	Reading	35	Modified	Brightbill / 19	26
4	1973-04-22	Bridgeport	25	Modified	Brightbill / 19	27
5	1973-04-29	Reading	35	Modified	Brightbill / 19	28
6	1973-05-13	Bridgeport	25	Modified	Brightbill / 19	29
7	1973-05-13	Reading	35	Modified	Brightbill / 19	30
8	1973-06-23	Bridgeport	25	Modified	Brightbill / 19	31
9	1973-06-29	Reading	35	Modified	Brightbill / 19	32
10	1973-06-30	Bridgeport	25	Modified	Brightbill / 19	33
11	1973-07-21	Reading	35	Modified	Brightbill / 19	34
12	1973-07-22	Reading	35	Modified	Brightbill / 19	35
13	1973-07-26	Bridgeport	25	Modified	Brightbill / 19	36
14	1973-08-11	Reading	35	Modified	Brightbill / 19	37
15	1973-08-19	Reading	35	Modified	Brightbill / 19	38
16	1973-08-22	Bridgeport	100	Modified	Brightbill / 19	39
17	1973-08-24	Reading	35	Modified	Brightbill / 19	40
18	1973-09-06	Bridgeport	25	Modified	Brightbill / 19	41
19	1973-09-13	Bridgeport	25	Modified	Brightbill / 19	42
20	1973-09-15	Reading	35	Modified	Brightbill / 19	43
21	1973-09-23	Reading	35	Modified	Brightbill / 19	44
22	1973-09-28	Reading	35	Modified	Brightbill / 19	45
23	1973-10-06	Reading	25	Modified	Brightbill / 19	46
24	1973-10-06	Reading	25	Modified	Brightbill / 19	47
25	1973-10-06	Reading	25	Modified	Brightbill / 19	48
26	1973-10-06	Reading	25	Modified	Brightbill / 19	49
27	1973-10-13	Reading	25	Modified	Brightbill / 19	50
28	1973-10-27	Reading	50	Modified	Brightbill / 19	51
29	1973-10-27	Reading	50	Modified	Brightbill / 19	52
1974
1	1974-03-10	Reading	35	Modified	Brightbill / 19	53
2	1974-04-07	Reading	35	Modified	Brightbill / 19	54
3	1974-04-21	Reading	35	Modified	Brightbill / 19	55
4	1974-04-28	Reading	35	Modified	Brightbill / 19	56
5	1974-05-05	Reading	35	Modified	Brightbill / 19	57
6	1974-06-07	Reading	35	Modified	Brightbill / 19	58
7	1974-07-14	Reading	35	Modified	Brightbill / 19	59
8	1974-07-21	Reading	35	Modified	Brightbill / 19	60
9	1974-07-28	Reading	35	Modified	Brightbill / 19	61
10	1974-08-05	Reading	35	Modified	Brightbill / 19	62
11	1974-08-11	Reading	35	Modified	Brightbill / 19	63
12	1974-08-16	Reading	35	Modified	Brightbill / 19	64
13	1974-08-20	Reading	50	Modified	Brightbill / 19	65
14	1974-09-14	Reading	35	Modified	Brightbill / 19	66
15	1974-09-15	Reading	35	Modified	Brightbill / 19	67
16	1974-09-20	Reading	35	Modified	Brightbill / 19	68
17	1974-09-27	Reading	35	Modified	Brightbill / 19	69
18	1974-10-05	Reading	200	Modified	Brightbill / 19	70
19	1974-10-19	Reading	25	Modified	Brightbill / 19	71
20	1974-10-19	Reading	25	Modified	Brightbill / 19	72
21	1974-10-26	Reading	50	Modified	Brightbill / 19	73
22	1974-10-26	Reading	50	Modified	Brightbill / 19	74
23	1974-11-10	Reading	30	Modified	Brightbill / 19	75
1975
1	1975-03-23	Reading	35	Modified	Brightbill / 19	76
2	1975-05-16	Reading	35	Modified	Brightbill / 19	77
3	1975-05-23	Reading	35	Modified	Brightbill / 19	78
4	1975-05-25	Reading	50	Modified	Brightbill / 19	79
5	1975-06-06	Reading	35	Modified	Brightbill / 19	80
6	1975-06-08	Reading	35	Modified	Brightbill / 19	81
7	1975-06-15	Reading	35	Modified	Brightbill / 19	82
8	1975-07-06	Reading	35	Modified	Brightbill / 19	83
9	1975-07-11	Reading	35	Modified	Brightbill / 19	84
10	1975-07-27	Reading	35	Modified	Brightbill / 19	85
11	1975-08-03	Reading	35	Modified	Brightbill / 19	86
12	1975-08-05	Penn National	50	Modified	Brightbill / 19	87
13	1975-09-13	Statewide	30	Modified	Brightbill / 19	88
14	1975-10-04	Reading	200	Modified	Brightbill / 19	89
1976
1	1976-03-14	Reading	35	Modified	Statewide / 19	90
2	1976-04-09	Reading	35	Modified	Statewide / 19	91
3	1976-04-11	Reading	35	Modified	Statewide / 19	92
4	1976-05-02	Reading	35	Modified	Statewide / 19	93
5	1976-05-07	Reading	35	Modified	Statewide / 19	94
6	1976-05-09	Reading	35	Modified	Statewide / 19	95
7	1976-06-04	Reading	35	Modified	Statewide / 19	96
8	1976-06-11	Reading	35	Modified	Statewide / 19	97
9	1976-06-12	Statewide	30	Modified	Statewide / 19	98
10	1976-06-13	Reading	50	Modified	Statewide / 19	99
11	1976-06-25	Reading	35	Modified	Statewide / 19	100
12	1976-07-06	Reading	50	Modified	Statewide / 19	101
13	1976-07-09	Reading	35	Modified	Statewide / 19	102
14	1976-07-10	Statewide	50	Modified	Statewide / 19	103
15	1976-07-11	Reading	35	Modified	Statewide / 19	104
16	1976-07-16	Reading	35	Modified	Statewide / 19	105
17	1976-07-17	Statewide	30	Modified	Statewide / 19	106
18	1976-07-18	Reading	35	Modified	Statewide / 19	107
19	1976-07-20	Reading	50	Modified	Statewide / 19	108
20	1976-07-24	Statewide	30	Modified	Statewide / 19	109
21	1976-07-30	Reading	35	Modified	Statewide / 19	110
22	1976-07-31	Statewide	30	Modified	Statewide / 19	111
23	1976-08-20	Reading	50	Modified	Statewide / 19	112
24	1976-08-29	Reading	35	Modified	Statewide / 19	113
25	1976-09-04	Statewide	50	Modified	Statewide / 19	114
26	1976-09-18	Statewide	30	Modified	Statewide / 19	115
27	1976-10-23	Reading	25	Modified	Statewide / 19	116
28	1976-10-23	Reading	25	Modified	Statewide / 19	117
29	1976-10-23	Reading	25	Modified	Statewide / 19	118
30	1976-11-07	Reading	35	Modified	Statewide / 19	119
1977
1	1977-03-06	Reading	35	Modified	Statewide / 19	120
2	1977-03-27	East Windsor	50	Modified	Statewide / 19	121
3	1977-04-01	Reading	35	Modified	Statewide / 19	122
4	1977-04-03	East Windsor	25	Modified	Statewide / 19	123
5	1977-04-03	East Windsor	25	Modified	Statewide / 19	124
6	1977-04-22	Reading	35	Modified	Statewide / 19	125
7	1977-04-29	Reading	35	Modified	Statewide / 19	126
8	1977-05-20	Reading	35	Modified	Statewide / 19	127
9	1977-05-30	Lincoln	50	Modified	Statewide / 19	128
10	1977-06-19	Reading	20	Modified	Statewide / 19	129
11	1977-06-21	Rolling Wheels	100	Modified	Statewide / 19	130
12	1977-06-24	Reading	35	Modified	Statewide / 19	131
13	1977-07-01	Reading	50	Modified	Statewide / 19	132
14	1977-07-20	Flemington	100	Modified	Statewide / 19	133
15	1977-07-29	Reading	35	Modified	Statewide / 19	134
16	1977-07-31	Reading	20	Modified	Statewide / 19	135
17	1977-08-07	Reading	20	Modified	Statewide / 19	136
18	1977-08-12	Reading	35	Modified	Statewide / 19	137
19	1977-08-14	Reading	20	Modified	Statewide / 19	138
20	1977-08-15	Albany-Saratoga	50	Modified	Statewide / 19	139
21	1977-08-30	Lebanon Valley	100	Modified	Statewide / 19	140
22	1977-10-22	Reading	25	Modified	Statewide / 19	141
23	1977-10-30	Reading	200	Modified	Statewide / 19	142
24	1977-11-06	Reading	30	Modified	Statewide / 19	143
25	1977-11-13	Reading	30	Modified	Statewide / 19	144
1978
1	1978-02-13	Volusia	30	Modified	Brightbill / 19	145
2	1978-02-14	Volusia	30	Modified	Brightbill / 19	146
3	1978-02-15	Volusia	30	Modified	Brightbill / 19	147
4	1978-04-07	Reading	35	Modified	Brightbill / 19	148
5	1978-04-08	Flemington	30	Modified	Brightbill / 19	149
6	1978-04-09	Reading	35	Modified	Brightbill / 19	150
7	1978-04-21	Reading	35	Modified	Brightbill / 19	151
8	1978-04-22	Bridgeport	25	Modified	Brightbill / 19	152
9	1978-04-22	Flemington	20	Modified	Brightbill / 19	153
10	1978-04-23	Reading	35	Modified	Brightbill / 19	154
11	1978-05-12	Reading	35	Modified	Brightbill / 19	155
12	1978-05-19	Reading	35	Modified	Brightbill / 19	156
13	1978-05-20	Flemington	30	Modified	Brightbill / 19	157
14	1978-05-28	Reading	35	Modified	Brightbill / 19	158
15	1978-06-04	Reading	35	Modified	Brightbill / 19	159
16	1978-06-15	Drummond	100	Modified	Brightbill / 19	160
17	1978-06-17	Flemington	30	Modified	Brightbill / 19	161
18	1978-06-23	Reading	35	Modified	Brightbill / 19	162
19	1978-06-24	Flemington	20	Modified	Brightbill / 19	163
20	1978-07-18	Reading	50	Modified	Brightbill / 19	164
21	1978-07-22	Flemington	30	Modified	Brightbill / 19	165
22	1978-07-28	Reading	35	Modified	Brightbill / 19	166
23	1978-08-04	Reading	35	Modified	Brightbill / 19	167
24	1978-08-13	Reading	35	Modified	Kreitz / 69	168
25	1978-08-18	Reading	35	Modified	Brightbill / 19	169
26	1978-08-19	Flemington	20	Modified	Brightbill / 19	170
27	1978-08-19	Flemington	20	Modified	Brightbill / 19	171
28	1978-08-19	Flemington	20	Modified	Brightbill / 19	172
29	1978-08-24	Five Mile Point	63	358 Modified	Brightbill / 19	173
30	1978-08-25	Reading	35	Modified	Brightbill / 19	174
31	1978-09-02	Flemington	30	Modified	Brightbill / 19	175
32	1978-09-03	Reading	35	Modified	Kreitz / 69	176
33	1978-09-16	Nazareth	100	Modified	Brightbill / 19	177
34	1978-09-23	Orange County	100	Modified	Brightbill / 19	178
35	1978-10-08	Reading	25	Modified	Brightbill / 19	179
36	1978-10-08	Reading	25	Modified	Brightbill / 19	180
37	1978-10-08	Reading	25	Modified	Brightbill / 19	181
38	1978-10-14	Five Mile Point	100	Modified	Brightbill / 19	182
39	1978-10-15	Reading	30	Modified	Brightbill / 19	183
40	1978-10-29	Reading	200	Modified	Brightbill / 19	184
1979
1	1979-03-18	Reading	35	Modified	Brightbill / 19	185
2	1979-06-16	Flemington	30	Modified	Brightbill / 19	186
3	1979-06-24	Reading	35	Modified	Brightbill / 19	187
4	1979-07-25	Fulton	50	Modified	Brightbill / 19	188
5	1979-07-28	Lincoln	50	Late Model	Brightbill / 19	189
6	1979-08-28	Albany-Saratoga	100	Modified	Brightbill / 19	190
1980
1	1980-02-09	Fl. St. Fairg'nds	25	Modified	3-D Racing / 19	191
2	1980-02-10	Fl. St. Fairg'nds	25	Modified	3-D Racing / 19	192
3	1980-02-11	Fl. St. Fairg'nds	25	Modified	3-D Racing / 19	193
4	1980-06-13	East Windsor	35	Modified	3-D Racing / 19	194
5	1980-06-20	East Windsor	35	Modified	3-D Racing / 19	195
6	1980-07-03	Albany-Saratoga	25	Modified	3-D Racing / 19	196
7	1980-07-15	Albany-Saratoga	100	Modified	3-D Racing / 19	197
8	1980-10-19	Orange County	200	Modified	3-D Racing / 19	198
9	1980-11-09	US 13	50	Modified	3-D Racing / 19	199
10	1980-11-30	Bridgeport	40	Modified	3-D Racing / 19	200
1981
1	1981-04-26	Nazareth	81	Modified	Brightbill / 19	201
2	1981-06-26	Georgetown	30	Modified	Brightbill / 19	202
3	1981-07-09	Grandview	50	Modified	Brightbill / 19	203
4	1981-07-11	Flemington	30	Modified	Brightbill / 19	204
5	1981-08-01	Speedway 7	50	Modified	Brightbill / 19	205
6	1981-08-20	Grandview	50	Modified	Brightbill / 19	206
7	1981-08-25	Bridgeport	100	Modified	Brightbill / 19	207
8	1981-09-20	Albany-Saratoga	50	Modified	Brightbill / 19	208
9	1981-09-27	Bridgeport	40	Modified	Brightbill / 19	209
10	1981-10-03	Flemington	200	Modified	Brightbill / 19	210
11	1981-11-01	US 13	50	Modified	Brightbill / 19	211
12	1981-11-01	US 13	50	Modified	Brightbill / 19	212
13	1981-11-29	Bridgeport	40	Modified	Brightbill / 19	213
1982
1	1982-06-25	Hagerstown	50	Late Model	Brightbill / 19	214
2	1982-07-03	Lincoln	50	Modified	Brightbill / 19	215
3	1982-07-10	US 13	35	Modified	Brightbill / 19	216
4	1982-07-14	Grandview	50	Modified	Brightbill / 19	217
5	1982-08-13	Williams Grove	50	Modified	Brightbill / 19	218
6	1982-09-04	Airborne Park	75	Modified	Brightbill / 19	219
7	1982-10-07	US 13	50	Late Model	Brightbill / 19	220
8	1982-12-05	Nazareth Nat.	100	Modified	Brightbill / 19	221
1983
1	1983-05-06	Big Diamond	25	358 Modified	Brightbill / 19	222
2	1983-05-07	US 13	30	Modified	Sharman / 19	223
3	1983-05-14	US 13	30	Modified	Sharman / 19	224
4	1983-06-19	K-C Raceway	100	Late Model	Brightbill / 19	225
5	1983-06-22	Grandview	40	358 Modified	Brightbill / 19	226
6	1983-07-04	Lincoln	35	Modified	Sharman / 19	227
7	1983-08-20	Hagerstown	100	Late Model	Malcuit / RM1	228
8	1983-09-03	Concord M. Park	100	Late Model	Malcuit / RM1	229
9	1983-10-09	Nazareth Nat.	132	Modified	Sharman / 19	230
10	1983-11-13	US 13	50	Modified	Sharman / 19	231
1984
1	1984-02-15	Volusia	30	Modified	Brightbill / 19	232
2	1984-02-17	Volusia	30	Modified	Brightbill / 19	233
3	1984-04-14	US 13	30	Modified	Brightbill / 19	234
4	1984-05-12	US 13	30	Modified	Brightbill / 19	235
5	1984-05-19	US 13	20	Modified	Brightbill / 19	236
6	1984-05-19	US 13	20	Modified	Brightbill / 19	237
7	1984-05-20	Hagerstown	40	Modified	Brightbill / 19	238
8	1984-05-26	Metrolina	100	Late Model	Brightbill / 19	239
9	1984-09-01	St. Clairsville	?	Late Model	Brightbill / 19	240
1985
1	1985-05-27	Dorsey	30	Modified	Brightbill / 19	241
2	1985-06-21	Williams Grove	20	Late Model	Brightbill / 19	242
3	1985-08-17	Brownstone	100	Late Model	Brightbill / 19	243
4	1985-11-16	Tri-County	100	Late Model	Brightbill / 19	244
1986
1	1986-03-23	Hagerstown	25	Late Model	Brightbill / 19	245
2	1986-05-24	Speedway 7	25	Modified	Brightbill / 19	246
3	1986-06-22	Hagerstown	20	Late Model	Brightbill / 19	247
4	1986-11-30	Bridgeport	50	Modified	Brightbill / 19	248
1987
1	1987-02-13	Volusia	30	Modified	Blue Hen / 30	249
2	1987-03-15	Bridgeport	30	Modified	Blue Hen / 30	250
3	1987-05-03	Rolling Wheels	87	Modified	Blue Hen / 30	251
4	1987-05-16	Delaware Intl.	20	Modified	Blue Hen / 30	252
5	1987-06-19	Bridgeport	20	Modified	Blue Hen / 30	253
6	1987-06-19	Bridgeport	30	Modified	Blue Hen / 30	254
7	1987-07-01	Lebanon Valley	87	Modified	Blue Hen / 30	255
8	1987-08-15	Delaware Intl.	25	Modified	Blue Hen / 30	256
9	1987-08-29	Delaware Intl.	20	Modified	Blue Hen / 30	257
10	1987-10-18	Fonda	200	Modified	Blue Hen / 30	258
1988
1	1988-03-13	Hagerstown	20	Modified	Blue Hen / 30	259
2	1988-03-13	Hagerstown	20	Modified	Blue Hen / 30	260
3	1988-04-22	Bridgeport	25	Modified	Blue Hen / 30	261
4	1988-06-03	Bridgeport	20	Modified	Blue Hen / 30	262
5	1988-07-29	Bridgeport	25	Modified	Blue Hen / 30	263
6	1988-07-30	Flemington	20	Modified	Blue Hen / 30	264
7	1988-08-02	Ransomville	88	Modified	Blue Hen / 30	265
8	1988-08-04	Lebanon Valley	88	Modified	Blue Hen / 30	266
9	1988-08-13	Flemington	20	Modified	Blue Hen / 30	267
10	1988-09-09	Ransomville	100	Modified	Blue Hen / 30	268
11	1988-10-09	NYS Fairgrounds	188	Modified	Blue Hen / 30	269
1989
1	1989-04-30	Cayuga County	89	Modified	Taylor / 1	270
2	1989-07-28	Big Diamond	25	358 Modified	Strickler / 19	271
3	1989-08-16	Woodhull	89	Modified	Taylor / 1	272
4	1989-09-24	Cayuga County	200	Modified	Taylor / 1	273
1990
1	1990-05-27	Penn National	20	358 Modified	Strickler / 19	274
2	1990-06-01	Big Diamond	25	358 Modified	Strickler / 19	275
3	1990-08-12	Penn National	25	358 Modified	Strickler / 19	276
4	1990-08-17	Big Diamond	25	358 Modified	Strickler / 19	277
5	1990-09-08	Grandview	76	358 Modified	Strickler / 19	278
6	1990-09-30	Bridgeport	20	358 Modified	Strickler / 19	279
7	1990-09-30	Bridgeport	100	Modified	Romeo / 44jr	280
1991
1	1991-04-07	Big Diamond	25	358 Modified	Strickler / 19	281
2	1991-04-28	Penn National	25	358 Modified	Strickler / 19	282
3	1991-05-10	Big Diamond	25	358 Modified	Strickler / 19	283
4	1991-05-26	Penn National	20	358 Modified	Strickler / 19	284
5	1991-05-31	Big Diamond	25	358 Modified	Strickler / 19	285
6	1991-06-26	Grandview	91	Modified	Brightbill / 19	286
7	1991-07-12	Big Diamond	20	358 Modified	Strickler / 19	287
8	1991-08-04	Penn National	25	358 Modified	Strickler / 19	288
9	1991-08-10	Flemington	20	Modified	Brightbill / 19	289
1992
1	1992-05-29	Big Diamond	25	358 Modified	Strickler / 19	290
2	1992-06-13	Grandview	25	358 Modified	Strickler / 19	291
3	1992-08-14	Big Diamond	25	358 Modified	Strickler / 19	292
4	1992-09-04	Big Diamond	50	358 Modified	Strickler / 19	293
1993
1	1993-04-04	Big Diamond	25	358 Modified	Strickler / 19	294
2	1993-04-17	Grandview	31	358 Modified	Strickler / 19	295
3	1993-05-02	Penn National	25	358 Modified	Strickler / 19	296
4	1993-05-22	Susquehanna	25	358 Modified	Strickler / 19	297
5	1993-05-28	Big Diamond	25	358 Modified	Strickler / 19	298
6	1993-05-30	Penn National	20	358 Modified	Strickler / 19	299
7	1993-06-12	Susquehanna	25	358 Modified	Strickler / 19	300
8	1993-07-10	Susquehanna	25	358 Modified	Strickler / 19	301
9	1993-07-17	Susquehanna	25	358 Modified	Strickler / 19	302
10	1993-07-25	Penn National	25	358 Modified	Strickler / 19	303
11	1993-08-07	Susquehanna	25	358 Modified	Strickler / 19	304
12	1993-08-14	Susquehanna	25	358 Modified	Strickler / 19	305
13	1993-08-15	Penn National	25	358 Modified	Strickler / 19	306
14	1993-08-27	Big Diamond	25	358 Modified	Strickler / 19	307
1994
1	1994-04-23	Susquehanna	25	358 Modified	Strickler / 19	308
2	1994-05-28	Susquehanna	50	358 Modified	Strickler / 19	309
3	1994-06-26	Penn National	25	358 Modified	Strickler / 19	310
4	1994-07-02	Susquehanna	20	358 Modified	Strickler / 19	311
5	1994-07-02	Susquehanna	20	358 Modified	Strickler / 19	312
6	1994-07-03	Penn National	50	358 Modified	Strickler / 19	313
7	1994-09-02	Big Diamond	50	358 Modified	Strickler / 19	314
8	1994-09-03	Susquehanna	100	358 Modified	Strickler / 19	315
9	1994-09-04	Penn National	100	358 Modified	Strickler / 19	316
10	1994-10-15	Penn National	25	358 Modified	Strickler / 19	317
11	1994-10-29	Bridgeport	200	Modified	Tab. Graphics / 19	318
1995
1	1995-04-15	Susquehanna	35	358 Modified	Tab. Graphics / 19	319
2	1995-04-29	Susquehanna	25	358 Modified	Tab. Graphics / 19	320
3	1995-05-27	Susquehanna	50	358 Modified	Tab. Graphics / 19	321
4	1995-06-16	East Windsor	25	358 Modified	Tab. Graphics / 19	322
5	1995-06-18	Penn National	25	358 Modified	Tab. Graphics / 19	323
6	1995-07-02	Penn National	25	358 Modified	Tab. Graphics / 19	324
7	1995-07-02	Penn National	25	358 Modified	Tab. Graphics / 19	325
8	1995-07-08	Susquehanna	50	358 Modified	Tab. Graphics / 19	326
9	1995-07-23	Penn National	25	358 Modified	Tab. Graphics / 19	327
10	1995-07-28	East Windsor	20	358 Modified	Tab. Graphics / 19	328
11	1995-07-29	Susquehanna	20	358 Modified	Tab. Graphics / 19	329
12	1995-07-29	Susquehanna	20	358 Modified	Tab. Graphics / 19	330
13	1995-07-30	Penn National	25	358 Modified	Tab. Graphics / 19	331
14	1995-08-13	Penn National	25	358 Modified	Tab. Graphics / 19	332
15	1995-08-16	Susquehanna	50	358 Modified	Tab. Graphics / 19	333
16	1995-09-15	East Windsor	100	358 Modified	Tab. Graphics / 19	334
17	1995-10-15	Hagerstown	20	358 Modified	Tab. Graphics / 19	335
18	1995-11-04	Delaware Intl.	50	358 Modified	Tab. Graphics / 19	336
1996
1	1996-03-23	Susquehanna	30	358 Modified	Tab. Graphics / 19	337
2	1996-04-14	Penn National	25	358 Modified	Tab. Graphics / 19	338
3	1996-04-19	East Windsor	25	358 Modified	Tab. Graphics / 19	339
4	1996-04-20	Bridgeport	25	Modified	Tab. Graphics / 19	340
5	1996-05-25	Susquehanna	50	358 Modified	Tab. Graphics / 19	341
6	1996-05-31	East Windsor	25	358 Modified	Tab. Graphics / 19	342
7	1996-06-22	Susquehanna	25	358 Modified	Tab. Graphics / 19	343
8	1996-07-05	East Windsor	25	358 Modified	Tab. Graphics / 19	344
9	1996-07-20	Susquehanna	25	358 Modified	Tab. Graphics / 19	345
10	1996-07-24	Susquehanna	96	Modified	Tab. Graphics / 19	346
11	1996-08-17	Susquehanna	30	358 Modified	Tab. Graphics / 19	347
12	1996-08-23	East Windsor	25	358 Modified	Tab. Graphics / 19	348
13	1996-08-24	Susquehanna	25	358 Modified	Tab. Graphics / 19	349
14	1996-08-27	East Windsor	50	358 Modified	Tab. Graphics / 19	350
15	1996-08-31	Susquehanna	35	358 Modified	Tab. Graphics / 19	351
16	1996-09-01	Penn National	100	358 Modified	Tab. Graphics / 19	352
17	1996-09-21	Bridgeport	25	Modified	Tab. Graphics / 19	353
18	1996-10-06	Fulton	200	358 Modified	Tab. Graphics / 19	354
1997
1	1997-04-20	Susquehanna	40	358 Modified	Tab. Graphics / 19	355
2	1997-05-16	East Windsor	25	358 Modified	Tab. Graphics / 19	356
3	1997-06-06	East Windsor	25	358 Modified	Tab. Graphics / 19	357
4	1997-06-19	Bridgeport	97	Modified	Tab. Graphics / 19	358
5	1997-07-04	East Windsor	25	358 Modified	Tab. Graphics / 19	359
6	1997-07-17	Delaware Intl.	25	Modified	Tab. Graphics / 19	360
7	1997-07-19	Susquehanna	30	358 Modified	Tab. Graphics / 19	361
8	1997-08-08	East Windsor	25	358 Modified	Tab. Graphics / 19	362
9	1997-08-11	Williams Grove	68	358 Modified	Tab. Graphics / 19	363
10	1997-09-19	East Windsor	100	358 Modified	Tab. Graphics / 19	364
11	1997-09-26	East Windsor	25	358 Modified	Tab. Graphics / 19	365
12	1997-11-23	Delaware Intl.	50	Modified	Tab. Graphics / 19	366
1998
1	1998-04-03	East Windsor	25	358 Modified	Tab. Graphics / 19	367
2	1998-04-04	New Egypt	30	Modified	Tab. Graphics / 19	368
3	1998-04-11	New Egypt	30	Modified	Tab. Graphics / 19	369
4	1998-04-18	New Egypt	30	Modified	Tab. Graphics / 19	370
5	1998-05-02	New Egypt	30	Modified	Tab. Graphics / 19	371
6	1998-05-16	Susquehanna	30	358 Modified	Tab. Graphics / 19	372
7	1998-06-06	Susquehanna	30	358 Modified	Tab. Graphics / 19	373
8	1998-07-03	East Windsor	25	358 Modified	Tab. Graphics / 19	374
9	1998-07-24	East Windsor	25	358 Modified	Tab. Graphics / 19	375
10	1998-07-25	New Egypt	30	Modified	Tab. Graphics / 19	376
11	1998-08-15	New Egypt	30	Modified	Tab. Graphics / 19	377
12	1998-08-19	New Egypt	50	Modified	Tab. Graphics / 19	378
13	1998-08-23	Susquehanna	30	358 Modified	Tab. Graphics / 19	379
14	1998-08-29	New Egypt	30	Modified	Tab. Graphics / 19	380
15	1998-09-04	East Windsor	20	358 Modified	Tab. Graphics / 19	381
16	1998-09-05	New Egypt	30	Modified	Tab. Graphics / 19	382
17	1998-09-06	Susquehanna	100	358 Modified	Tab. Graphics / 19	383
18	1998-09-11	East Windsor	25	358 Modified	Tab. Graphics / 19	384
19	1998-09-12	New Egypt	30	Modified	Tab. Graphics / 19	385
20	1998-09-18	East Windsor	100	358 Modified	Tab. Graphics / 19	386
21	1998-09-19	New Egypt	30	Modified	Tab. Graphics / 19	387
1999
1	1999-03-27	Susquehanna	40	Modified	Tab. Graphics / 19	388
2	1999-04-10	New Egypt	30	Modified	Tab. Graphics / 19	389
3	1999-05-01	New Egypt	30	Modified	Tab. Graphics / 19	390
4	1999-05-14	East Windsor	25	358 Modified	Tab. Graphics / 19	391
5	1999-05-22	New Egypt	30	Modified	Tab. Graphics / 19	392
6	1999-05-29	New Egypt	50	Modified	Tab. Graphics / 19	393
7	1999-06-04	East Windsor	25	358 Modified	Tab. Graphics / 19	394
8	1999-06-05	New Egypt	30	Modified	Tab. Graphics / 19	395
9	1999-06-19	New Egypt	30	Modified	Tab. Graphics / 19	396
10	1999-07-03	New Egypt	40	Modified	Tab. Graphics / 19	397
11	1999-07-04	East Windsor	25	358 Modified	Tab. Graphics / 19	398
12	1999-07-09	East Windsor	25	358 Modified	Tab. Graphics / 19	399
13	1999-07-10	New Egypt	30	Modified	Tab. Graphics / 19	400
14	1999-07-16	East Windsor	25	358 Modified	Tab. Graphics / 19	401
15	1999-07-17	New Egypt	30	Modified	Tab. Graphics / 19	402
16	1999-07-23	East Windsor	20	358 Modified	Tab. Graphics / 19	403
17	1999-07-23	East Windsor	20	358 Modified	Tab. Graphics / 19	404
18	1999-08-13	East Windsor	25	358 Modified	Tab. Graphics / 19	405
19	1999-09-03	East Windsor	20	358 Modified	Tab. Graphics / 19	406
2000
1	2000-03-19	Williams Grove	30	358 Modified	Tab. Graphics / 19	407
2	2000-04-28	Susquehanna	25	Modified	Tab. Graphics / 19	408
3	2000-05-05	Susquehanna	25	Modified	Tab. Graphics / 19	409
4	2000-05-12	Susquehanna	25	Modified	Tab. Graphics / 19	410
5	2000-07-07	East Windsor	25	358 Modified	Tab. Graphics / 19	411
6	2000-08-05	New Egypt	30	Modified	Tab. Graphics / 19	412
7	2000-08-09	Delaware Intl.	50	Modified	Tab. Graphics / 19	413
8	2000-08-25	East Windsor	25	358 Modified	Tab. Graphics / 19	414
9	2000-09-03	Susquehanna	50	358 Modified	Tab. Graphics / 19	415
10	2000-11-04	Delaware Intl.	50	358 Modified	Tab. Graphics / 19	416
2001
1	2001-05-04	East Windsor	25	358 Modified	Tab. Graphics / 19	417
2	2001-05-19	New Egypt	30	Modified	Tab. Graphics / 19	418
3	2001-06-29	East Windsor	25	358 Modified	Tab. Graphics / 19	419
4	2001-07-07	New Egypt	30	Modified	Tab. Graphics / 19	420
5	2001-07-20	East Windsor	20	358 Modified	Tab. Graphics / 19	421
6	2001-07-27	East Windsor	25	358 Modified	Tab. Graphics / 19	422
7	2001-09-15	New Egypt	30	Modified	Tab. Graphics / 19	423
8	2001-09-28	East Windsor	50	358 Modified	Tab. Graphics / 19	424
2002
1	2002-04-27	New Egypt	30	Modified	Tab. Graphics / 19	425
2	2002-05-10	East Windsor	25	358 Modified	Tab. Graphics / 19	426
3	2002-08-16	East Windsor	25	358 Modified	Tab. Graphics / 19	427
4	2002-09-28	New Egypt	30	Modified	Tab. Graphics / 19	428
5	2002-10-05	New Egypt	30	Modified	Tab. Graphics / 19	429
6	2002-10-27	Hagerstown	100	358 Modified	Tab. Graphics / 19	430
2003
1	2003-07-04	Big Diamond	20	358 Modified	Brightbill / 19	431
2	2003-08-16	New Egypt	30	Modified	Brightbill / 19	432
3	2003-09-06	New Egypt	30	Modified	Brightbill / 19	433
2004
No wins
2005
No wins
2006
No wins
2007
No wins
2008
No wins
2009
No wins
2010
1	2010-04-24	Delaware Intl.	25	Modified	Colbourne / 55	434
2	2010-05-01	Delaware Intl.	25	Modified	Colbourne / 55	435
3	2010-05-15	Delaware Intl.	25	Modified	Colbourne / 55	436
4	2010-05-29	Delaware Intl.	25	Modified	Colbourne / 55	437
5	2010-06-12	Delaware Intl.	25	Modified	Colbourne / 55	438
2011
1	2011-06-04	Delaware Intl.	20	Modified	Colbourne / 55	439
2012
No wins
2013
1	2013-07-10	Kutztown	30	SpeedSTR	Brightbill / 19	440
2014
1	2014-07-31	Kutztown	30	SpeedSTR	Brightbill / 19	441

==== Wins by track ====
Track	Modified	Small Block	Late Model	Speedster	Total
Reading	135				135
East Windsor	5	38			43
Susquehanna	5	32			37
Bridgeport	29	1			30
New Egypt	29				29
Delaware Intl./US13	23	2	1		26
Penn National	2	21			23
Flemington	17				17
Big Diamond		16			16
Hagerstown	3	2	4		9
Grandview	4	4			8
Statewide	8				8
Volusia	6				6
Albany-Saratoga	5				5
Lincoln	3		1		4
Williams Grove	1	2	1		4
Fl. St. Fairgrounds	3				3
Lebanon Valley	3				3
Rolling Wheels	3				3
Cayuga County	2				2
Five Mile Point	1	1			2
Fulton	1	1			2
Kutztown				2	2
Nazareth	2				2
Nazareth National	2				2
NYS Fairgrounds	2				2
Orange County	2				2
Ransomeville	2				2
Speedway 7	2				2
Airborne	2				2
Brownstone	1				1
Concorde Park			1		1
Dorsey					0
Drummond	1				1
Fonda	1				1
Georgetown	1				1
K-C			1		1
Metrolina			1		1
St. Clairsville			1		1
Tri-County			1		1
Woodhull			1		1
41 tracks	306	120	13	2	441
