= Carl Van Horn =

American racing driver

Carl "Fuzzy" Van Horn
- Born: Carl B. Van Horn; May 7, 1933 Belvidere, New Jersey, U.S.
- Died: July 17, 2017 (aged 87)
- Retired: 1996
- Debut season: 1951

Modified racing career
- Car number: 2a, 71e
- Championships: 2
- Wins: 57

NASCAR Cup Series career
- 1 race run over 1 year
- Best finish: 94th (1975)
- First race: 1975 Purolator 500 (Pocono)
Wins	Top tens	Poles
0	0	0

Carl "Fuzzy" Van Horn (May 7, 1933 – July 17, 2017) was a Modified driver from Phillipsburg, New Jersey. He drove several cars including his own 71E and later the 2A.

== Racing career ==
Van Horn got his start in racing in 1951 at the East Stroudsburg Speedway, Pennsylvania. Van Horn's 16-year-old brother built a car, but was too young to drive, and "Fuzzy" was pressed into service when another driver could not get the car up to speed. It took four years before he got his first victory, but he went on to become was one of the most successful dirt track drivers in the Mid-Atlantic states.

Van Horn competed at the Vineland, Alcyon (Pitman), and Harmony Speedways in New Jersey, Lebanon Valley Speedway in New York, and Reading Fairgrounds Speedway in Pennsylvania. Van Horn won track championships at Orange County Fair Speedway in Middletown, New York, and Nazareth Speedway, Pennsylvania. He made one start in the NASCAR Cup Series at Pocono Raceway in 1975.

Van Horn was inducted in the Northeast Dirt Modified Hall of Fame in 2008 and the Eastern Press Motorsports Association in 2009.

== Personal life ==
Van Horn was union ironworker by trade who helped to build the Twin Towers of the World Trade Center in New York City. He died on July 17, 2017.

== Motorsports career results ==
=== NASCAR ===
(key) (Bold – Pole position awarded by qualifying time. Italics – Pole position earned by points standings or practice time. * – Most laps led.)

==== Winston Cup Series ====
NASCAR Winston Cup Series results
Year	Team	No.	Make	1	2	3	4	5	6	7	8	9	10	11	12	13	14	15	16	17	18	19	20	21	22	23	24	25	26	27	28	29	30	NWCC	Pts	Ref
1975	Ballard Racing	30	Chevy	RSD	DAY	RCH	CAR	BRI	ATL	NWS	DAR	MAR	TAL	NSV	DOV	CLT	RSD	MCH	DAY	NSV	POC; 23	TAL	MCH	DAR	DOV	NWS	MAR	CLT	RCH	CAR	BRI	ATL	ONT	94th	94	
