= Al Tasnady =

American racing driver (1930–1988)

- Born: Alex A. Tasnady; March 4, 1930 Manville, New Jersey, U.S.
- Died: December 3, 1988 (aged 58) Stroudsburg, Pennsylvania, U.S.
- Retired: 1972

Modified racing career
- Debut season: 1949
- Car number: 39, 44, 707
- Championships: 9
- Wins: 600+

Previous series
- 1957: NASCAR Convertible Division

NASCAR Cup Series career
- 4 races run over 4 years
- First race: 1956 Daytona Beach, Florida
- Last race: 1967 Trenton, New Jersey
Wins	Top tens	Poles
0	0	0

Alex Tasnady (March 4, 1930 – December 3, 1988) was an American stock car racing driver from Stroudsburg, Pennsylvania. After retiring from driving, Tasnady served as race director for Flemington Speedway.

== Racing career ==
Tasnady made four appearances in the NASCAR Grand National Series. In 1957, he also made 16 starts in the NASCAR Convertible Division in a factory backed Plymouth.

Tasnady otherwise spent the majority of his career racing in the Modified divisions competing at the renowned tracks of the northeast, including Nazareth Speedway and Reading Fairgrounds Speedway in Pennsylvania, and Flemington Speedway in New Jersey. He is thought to be the first modified driver to have an organized fan club, and in 1963 was recognized by the Greater New York Auto Racing Fraternity as the number 1 driver in the country.

Tasnady was inducted into the Eastern Motorsports Press Association and the Northeast Dirt Modified Halls of Fame.

== Motorsports career results ==
=== NASCAR ===
(key) (Bold – Pole position awarded by qualifying time. Italics – Pole position earned by points standings or practice time. * – Most laps led.)

==== Grand National Series ====
NASCAR Grand National Series results
Year	Team	No.	Make	1	2	3	4	5	6	7	8	9	10	11	12	13	14	15	16	17	18	19	20	21	22	23	24	25	26	27	28	29	30	31	32	33	34	35	36	37	38	39	40	41	42	43	44	45	46	47	48	49	50	51	52	53	54	55	56	NGNC	Pts	Ref
1956	Al Tansady	144	Plymouth	HCY	CLT	WSS	PBS	ASF	DAB; 77	PBS	WIL	ATL	NWS	LAN	RCH	CLB	CON	GPS	HCY	HBO	MAR	LIN	CLT	POR	EUR	NYF	MER	MAS	CLT	MCF	POR	AWS	RSP	PIF	CSF	CHI	CCF	MGY	OKL	ROA	OBS	SAN	NOR	PIF	MYB	POR	DAR	CSH	CLT	LAN	POR	CLB	HBO	NWP	CLT	CCF	MAR	HCY	WIL			
1957	Romeo Gelsi	54	Plymouth	WSS	CON	TIC	DAB; 52	CON	WIL	HBO	AWS	NWS	LAN	CLT	PIF	GBF	POR	CCF	RCH	MAR	POR	EUR	LIN	LCS	ASP	NWP	CLB	CPS	PIF	JAC	RSP	CLT	MAS	POR	HCY	NOR	LCS	GLN	KPC	LIN	OBS	MYB	DAR	NYF	AWS	CSF	SCF	LAN	CLB	CCF	CLT	MAR	NBR	CON	NWS	GBF						
1960	Al Tasnady	84	Ford	CLT	CLB	DAY	DAY	DAY	CLT	NWS	PHO	CLB	MAR	HCY	WIL; 12	BGS	GPS	AWS	DAR	PIF	HBO	RCH	HMS	CLT	BGS	DAY	HEI	MAB	MBS	ATL	BIR	NSV	AWS	PIF	CLB	SBO	BGS	DAR	HCY	CSF	GSP	HBO	MAR	NWS	CLT	RCH	ATL															
1967	Buck Baker	88	Oldsmobile	AUG	RSD	DAY	DAY	DAY	AWS	BRI	GPS	BGS	ATL	CLB	HCY	NWS	MAR	SVH	RCH	DAR	BLV	LGY	CLT	ASH	MGR	SMR	BIR	CAR	GPS	MGY	DAY	TRN; 24	OXF	FDA	ISP	BRI	SMR	NSV	ATL	BGS	CLB	SVH	DAR	HCY	RCH	BLV	HBO	MAR	NWS	CLT	CAR	AWS								120th	80	
