= Budd Olsen =

American racing driver

- Born: Purdy G. Olsen; October 16, 1924 Thorofare, New Jersey, U.S.
- Died: December 26, 1991 (aged 67) Thorofare, New Jersey, U.S.
- Retired: 1973
- Debut season: 1948

Modified racing career
- Car number: 0, 44, 92
- Championships: 1
- Wins: 73

Previous series
- 1948-1956: Sprint cars

Championship titles
- 1951 National Auto Racers Sprint Car Champion; 1958 NASCAR National Modified Champion

NASCAR Cup Series career
- 2 races run over 2 years
- Best finish: 51st (1949)
- First race: 1949 Langhorne Speedway PA
- Last race: 1961 Norwood Arena Speedway MA
Wins	Top tens	Poles
0	0	0

Purdy “Budd” Olsen (October 16, 1924 – December 26, 1991) was an American national champion stock car and sprint car racing driver from the Thorofare section of West Deptford Township, New Jersey.

== Racing career ==
Olsen made two appearances in the NASCAR Grand National Series, the first of which was in 1949, the inaugural year of the series, where he finished 12th. He otherwise spent the majority of his career racing in the Modified division, and won the 1958 NASCAR Modified Championship.

Olsen competed at the renowned tracks of the northeast, including Nazareth Speedway and Reading Fairgrounds Speedway in Pennsylvania, and Flemington Speedway and Wall Stadium in New Jersey. Olsen was inducted into the Eastern Motorsports Press Association and the Northeast Dirt Modified Halls of Fame.

== Personal life ==
Olsen was the brother-in-law of Jackie McLaughlin, who suffered a fatal racing accident in 1964. Olsen was a skilled fabricator and began building race chassis with his son Doug. Their chassis was a dominant player in the racing world for over two decades until Doug's 2019 death.

== Motorsports career results ==
=== NASCAR ===
(key) (Bold – Pole position awarded by qualifying time. Italics – Pole position earned by points standings or practice time. * – Most laps led.)

==== Grand National Series ====
NASCAR Grand National Series results
Year	Team	No.	Make	1	2	3	4	5	6	7	8	9	10	11	12	13	14	15	16	17	18	19	20	21	22	23	24	25	26	27	28	29	30	31	32	33	34	35	36	37	38	39	40	41	42	43	44	45	46	47	48	49	50	51	52	NGNC	Pts	Ref
1949	Walt Frank	39	Mercury	CLT	DAB	HBO	LAN; 12	HAM	MAR	HEI	NWS																																													51st	180	
1961	Budd Olsen	56	Chevy	CLT	JSP	DAY	DAY	DAY	PIF	AWS	HMS	ATL	GPS	HBO	BGS	MAR	NWS	CLB	HCY	RCH	MAR	DAR	CLT	CLT	RSD	ASP	CLT	PIF	BIR	GPS	BGS	NOR; 13	HAS	STR	DAY	ATL	CLB	MBS	BRI	NSV	BGS	AWS	RCH	SBO	DAR	HCY	RCH	CSF	ATL	MAR	NWS	CLT	BRI	GPS	HBO		42	
