= Bobby Malzahn =

American racing driver (1930–2013)

- Born: Robert W. Malzahn; October 13, 1930
- Died: August 26, 2013 (aged 82) Edgewater, Florida, U.S.

Modified racing career
- Debut season: 1951
- Car number: 99
- Championships: 6

Championship titles
- 1958 Trenton NASCAR National; 1961 Langhorne National Open

NASCAR Cup Series career
- 1 race run over 1 year
- Last race: 1958 (Raleigh Speedway) NC

Robert Malzahn (October 19, 1930 – August 26, 2013) was an American stock car racing driver. He moved from Miami, Florida, to New Jersey to further his racing career and became a standout on the Mid-Atlantic stock car circuit.

== Racing career ==
Bobby Malzahn (as Bob Malzahn) made just one appearance in the Grand National Series in 1958. He spent the majority of his career racing in the modified division, competing regularly at Pennsylvania's Nazareth Speedway and Reading Fairgrounds Speedway, and capturing track championships at Orange County Fair Speedway in New York, along with New Egypt Speedway, Old Bridge Stadium, and Wall Stadium in New Jersey.

Malzahn was won national events at Trenton Speedway in New Jersey in 1958 and Langhorne Speedway in Pennsylvania in 1961. He was inducted into the Northeast Dirt Modified Hall of Fame in 1994.

== Motorsports career results ==
=== NASCAR ===
(key) (Bold – Pole position awarded by qualifying time. Italics – Pole position earned by points standings or practice time. * – Most laps led.)

==== Grand National Series ====
NASCAR Grand National Series results
Year	Team	No.	Make	1	2	3	4	5	6	7	8	9	10	11	12	13	14	15	16	17	18	19	20	21	22	23	24	25	26	27	28	29	30	31	32	33	34	35	36	37	38	39	40	41	42	43	44	45	46	47	48	49	50	51	NGNC	Pts	Ref
1958		400	Ford	FAY	DAB	CON	FAY	WIL	HBO	FAY	CLB	PIF	ATL	CLT	MAR	ODS	OBS	GPS	GBF	STR	NWS	BGS	TRN	RSD	CLB	NBS	REF	LIN	HCY	AWS	RSP; 48	MCC	SLS	TOR	BUF	MCF	BEL	BRR	CLB	NSV	AWS	BGS	MBS	DAR	CLT	BIR	CSF	GAF	RCH	HBO	SAS	MAR	NWS	ATL			
