= 1975 NASCAR Winston Cup Series =

American motorsport season

Seasons
- ← 1974 1976 →

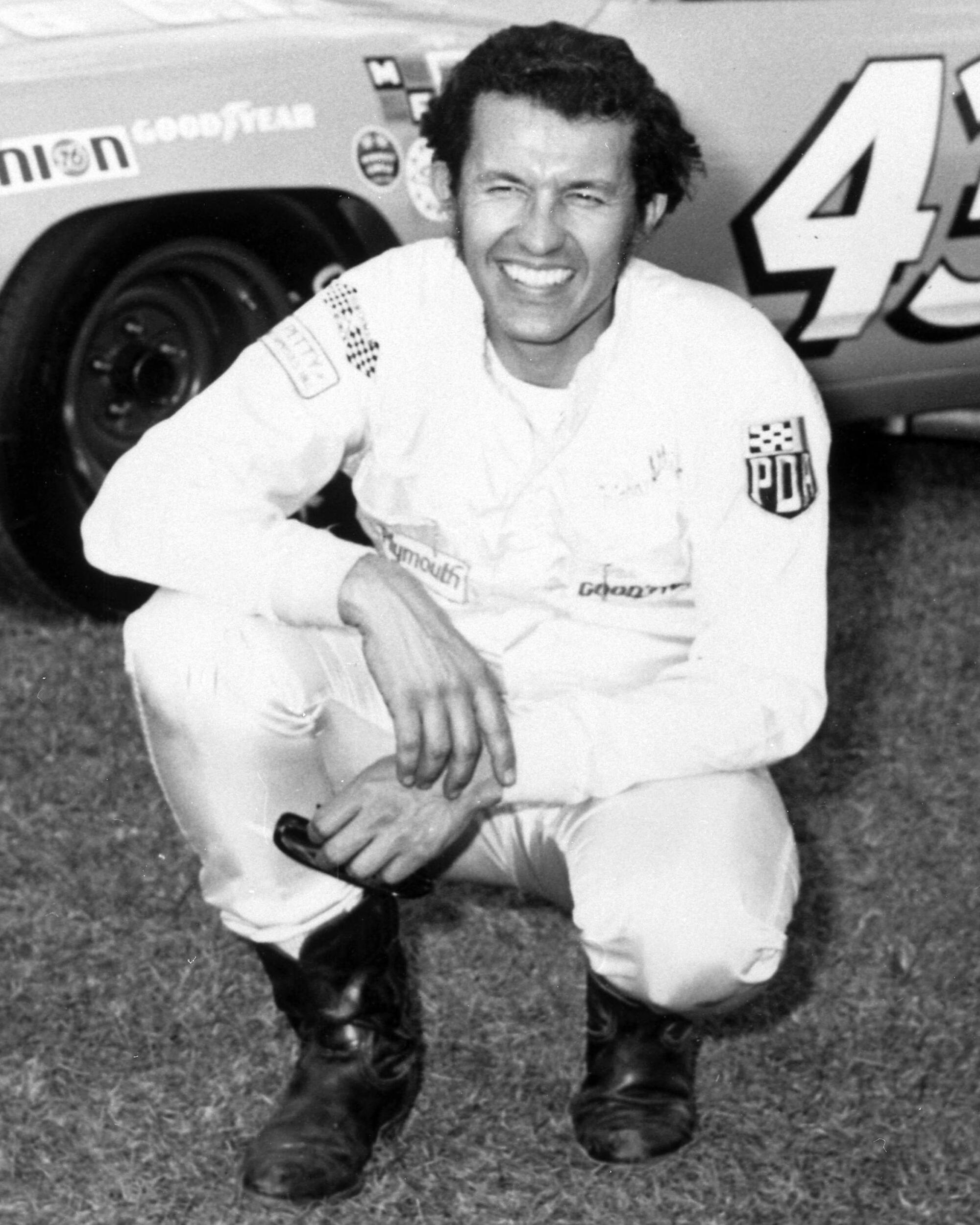
Richard Petty, the 1975 NASCAR Winston Cup Series Champion. This would be his 6th of his 7 championships.

The 1975 NASCAR Grand National Winston Cup Series was the 27th season of professional stock car racing in the United States and the 4th season in the modern era of the NASCAR Cup series. The season began on Sunday, January 19 and ended on Sunday, November 12. Richard Petty, driving the #43 Petty Enterprises STP Dodge scored his sixth NASCAR Grand National Series Winston Cup Championship. Bruce Hill was named NASCAR Rookie of the Year. NASCAR introduced a new points system for 1975, a system designed by statistician Bob Latford. For the first time, each race on the NASCAR Winston Cup Grand National schedule carried an equal point value, a system that would be used for 36 seasons, from 1975 to 2010, with modifications in 2004 and 2007 each time by increasing the emphasis for a win in adding five additional points each time for a race winner. The original points system ran for the first 29 seasons, from 1975 to 2003.

== Season recap ==
No.	Date	Event	Circuit	Pole position	Most laps led	Winner	Manufacturer
1	January 19	Winston Western 500	Riverside International Raceway	Bobby Allison	Bobby Allison	Bobby Allison	AMC
	February 13	125 Mile Qualifying Races	Daytona International Speedway			Bobby Allison	
	February 13	125 Mile Qualifying Races	Daytona International Speedway			David Pearson	
2	February 16	Daytona 500	Daytona International Speedway	Donnie Allison	David Pearson	Benny Parsons	Chevrolet
3	February 23	Richmond 500	Richmond Fairgrounds Raceway	Richard Petty	Richard Petty	Richard Petty	Dodge
4	March 2	Carolina 500	North Carolina Speedway	Buddy Baker	Cale Yarborough	Cale Yarborough	Chevrolet
5	March 16	Southeastern 500	Bristol International Speedway	Buddy Baker	Richard Petty	Richard Petty	Dodge
6	March 23	Atlanta 500	Atlanta International Raceway	Richard Petty	Richard Petty	Richard Petty	Dodge
7	April 6	Gwyn Staley 400	North Wilkesboro Speedway	Darrell Waltrip	Richard Petty	Richard Petty	Dodge
8	April 13	Rebel 500	Darlington Raceway	David Pearson	David Pearson	Bobby Allison	AMC
9	April 27	Virginia 500	Martinsville Speedway	Benny Parsons	Richard Petty	Richard Petty	Dodge
10	May 4	Winston 500	Alabama International Motor Speedway	Buddy Baker	Buddy Baker	Buddy Baker	Ford
11	May 10	Music City USA 420	Nashville Speedway	Darrell Waltrip	Cale Yarborough	Darrell Waltrip	Chevrolet
12	May 18 &19	Mason-Dixon 500	Dover Downs International Speedway	David Pearson	David Pearson	David Pearson	Mercury
13	May 25	World 600	Charlotte Motor Speedway	David Pearson	Richard Petty	Richard Petty	Dodge
14	June 8	Tuborg 400	Riverside International Raceway	Bobby Allison	Bobby Allison	Richard Petty	Dodge
15	June 15	Motor State 400	Michigan International Speedway	Cale Yarborough	David Pearson	David Pearson	Mercury
16	July 4	Firecracker 400	Daytona International Speedway	Donnie Allison	Buddy Baker	Richard Petty	Dodge
17	July 20	Nashville 420	Nashville Speedway	Benny Parsons	Cale Yarborough	Cale Yarborough	Chevrolet
18	August 3	Purolator 500	Pocono Raceway	Bobby Allison	David Pearson	David Pearson	Mercury
19	August 17	Talladega 500	Alabama International Motor Speedway	Dave Marcis	Buddy Baker	Buddy Baker	Ford
20	August 24	Champion Spark Plug 400	Michigan International Speedway	David Pearson	A.J. Foyt	Richard Petty	Dodge
21	September 1	Southern 500	Darlington Raceway	David Pearson	Richard Petty	Bobby Allison	AMC
22	September 14	Delaware 500	Dover Downs International Speedway	Dave Marcis	Richard Petty	Richard Petty	Dodge
23	September 21	Wilkes 400	North Wilkesboro Speedway	Richard Petty	Richard Petty	Richard Petty	Dodge
24	September 28	Old Dominion 500	Martinsville Speedway	Cale Yarborough	Cale Yarborough	Dave Marcis	Dodge
25	October 5	National 500	Charlotte Motor Speedway	David Pearson	Richard Petty	Richard Petty	Dodge
26	October 12	Capital City 500	Richmond Fairgrounds Raceway	Benny Parsons	Lennie Pond	Darrell Waltrip	Chevrolet
27	October 19	American 500	North Carolina Speedway	Dave Marcis	Cale Yarborough	Cale Yarborough	Chevrolet
28	November 2	Volunteer 500	Bristol International Speedway	Cale Yarborough	Richard Petty	Richard Petty	Dodge
29	November 9	Dixie 500	Atlanta International Raceway	Dave Marcis	Buddy Baker	Buddy Baker	Ford
30	November 23	Los Angeles Times 500	Ontario Motor Speedway	David Pearson	Buddy Baker	Buddy Baker	Ford

== 1975 Season races ==
=== Round 1: Winston Western 500 ===
Bobby Allison led 173 laps at Riverside International Raceway in Roger Penske's AMC Matador to beat David Pearson by 22 seconds.

Top 10 finishers
Pos.	No.	Driver	Make
1	16	Bobby Allison	AMC
2	21	David Pearson	Mercury
3	24	Cecil Gordon	Chevrolet
4	71	Dave Marcis	Dodge
5	64	Elmo Langley	Ford
6	48	James Hylton	Chevrolet
7	43	Richard Petty	Dodge
8	57W	Gary Matthews	Chevrolet
9	8	Ed Negre	Dodge
10	29W	Hershel McGriff	Chevrolet

=== Round 2: Daytona 500 ===
After falling back several laps due to overheating, Richard Petty pulled forward Benny Parsons in his draft to catch Pearson. With three to go Pearson moved into a group of lapped cars that included Cale Yarborough; inexplicably Yarborough got into Pearson and David spun down the backstretch. The win was Parsons' first since 1973.

Top 10 finishers
Pos.	No.	Driver	Make
1	72	Benny Parsons	Chevrolet
2	16	Bobby Allison	AMC
3	11	Cale Yarborough	Chevrolet
4	21	David Pearson	Mercury
5	83	Ramo Stott	Chevrolet
6	71	Dave Marcis	Dodge
7	43	Richard Petty	Dodge
8	98	Richie Panch	Chevrolet
9	49	G.C. Spencer	Dodge
10	48	James Hylton	Chevrolet

=== Round 3: Richmond 500 ===
With a field of only 22 entries due to a dearth of team sponsorships, Petty led 444 laps and won by six laps. Cale Yarborough was among the teams not entered, due to losing Carling sponsorship after the 1974 season.

Top 10 finishers
Pos.	No.	Driver	Make
1	43	Richard Petty	Dodge
2	54	Lennie Pond	Chevrolet
3	72	Benny Parsons	Chevrolet
4	90	Dick Brooks	Ford
5	64	Elmo Langley	Ford
6	67	Buddy Arrington	Dodge
7	24	Cecil Gordon	Chevrolet
8	05	David Sisco	Chevrolet
9	96	Richard Childress	Chevrolet
10	8	Ed Negre	Dodge

=== Round 4: Carolina 500 ===
The 1975 Carolina 500 was run on March 2. In below-freezing temperatures, Cale Yarborough edged Pearson for the win while Petty finished nine laps down due to the same overheating problems that had plagued him at Daytona.

Top 10 finishers
Pos.	No.	Driver	Make
1	11	Cale Yarborough	Chevrolet
2	21	David Pearson	Mercury
3	43	Richard Petty	Dodge
4	90	Dick Brooks	Ford
5	47	Bruce Hill	Chevrolet
6	96	Richard Childress	Chevrolet
7	8	Ed Negre	Dodge
8	48	James Hylton	Chevrolet
9	67	Buddy Arrington	Dodge
10	7	Dean Dalton	Ford

=== Round 5: Southeastern 500 ===
Richard Petty won his first race at Bristol International Speedway since 1967. Cale Yarborough led 78 laps but fell out with rearend failure. Following the race Maurice Petty found out the team's overheating problems traced to cracked cylinder heads; "we discovered another cracked head that could have cost us the race."

Top 10 finishers
Pos.	No.	Driver	Make
1	43	Richard Petty	Dodge
2	72	Benny Parsons	Chevrolet
3	15	Buddy Baker	Ford
4	24	Cecil Gordon	Chevrolet
5	48	James Hylton	Chevrolet
6	17	Darrell Waltrip	Chevrolet
7	05	David Sisco	Chevrolet
8	71	Dave Marcis	Dodge
9	96	Richard Childress	Chevrolet
10	10	Ricky Rudd	Ford

=== Round 6: Atlanta 500 ===
With Maurice fixing the team's cylinder head issues, Richard Petty engaged Pearson in a running duel for the lead, but Pearson lost a lap in the final 30 laps, result of a slow leaking tire and resultant green flag stop. A late caution for Lennie Pond's engine failure set up a one-lap duel between Petty and Buddy Baker; Petty contended the race ran past 328 laps, a statement supported by his official scorer (Richard Hucks) and the scorers for Pearson (Grover Atkins) and Dick Brooks (Russell Page), but NASCAR showed scoring cards proving it had run the correct distance; among those who scored the race was Richard's daughter Sharon, who said Petty "went by 328 times." Manual scoring with cards and a clock created controversy over the years in NASCAR; the system was used until 1993, when NASCAR switched to transponder-based scoring, which was supplemented by GPS-based scoring in 2003 to determine winners of the race if necessary.

Top 10 finishers
Pos.	No.	Driver	Make
1	43	Richard Petty	Dodge
2	15	Buddy Baker	Ford
3	21	David Pearson	Mercury
4	90	Dick Brooks	Ford
5	17	Darrell Waltrip	Chevrolet
6	88	Donnie Allison	Chevrolet
7	14	Coo Coo Marlin	Chevrolet
8	24	Cecil Gordon	Chevrolet
9	97	Harry Jefferson	Ford
10	54	Lennie Pond	Chevrolet

=== Round 7: Gwyn Staley 400 ===
The 1975 Gwyn Staley 400 took place on April 6 at North Wilkesboro Speedway. The race was dominated by Richard Petty, who led a total of 311 laps and won by a margin of over three laps.

Top 10 finishers
Pos.	No.	Driver	Make
1	43	Richard Petty	Dodge
2	11	Cale Yarborough	Chevrolet
3	15	Buddy Baker	Ford
4	71	Dave Marcis	Dodge
5	54	Lennie Pond	Chevrolet
6	72	Benny Parsons	Chevrolet
7	17	Darrell Waltrip	Chevrolet
8	90	Dick Brooks	Ford
9	24	Cecil Gordon	Chevrolet
10	30	Walter Ballard	Chevrolet

=== Round 8: Rebel 500 ===
Darlington Raceway once again proved tougher than Richard Petty as the #43 Dodge crashed out after 159 laps. Benny Parsons and David Pearson got into the late duel for the lead; when Pearson dove under Parsons entering Turn One on lap 350 both cars hammered the wall and ground to a halt. Bobby Allison, who'd been two laps down earlier, unlapped himself and edged Darrell Waltrip and Donnie Allison nose to tail at the stripe.

Top 10 finishers
Pos.	No.	Driver	Make
1	16	Bobby Allison	AMC
2	17	Darrell Waltrip	Chevrolet
3	88	Donnie Allison	Chevrolet
4	71	Dave Marcis	Dodge
5	14	Coo Coo Marlin	Chevrolet
6	72	Benny Parsons	Chevrolet
7	21	David Pearson	Mercury
8	48	James Hylton	Chevrolet
9	37	Bruce Jacobi	Chevrolet
10	67	Buddy Arrington	Plymouth

=== Round 9: Virginia 500 ===
The 1975 Virginia 500 was run on April 27 at Martinsville Speedway. The race saw Richard Petty, Darrell Waltrip, and Cale Yarborough battle in out for the lead in the closing stages of the race. At lap 397, Yarborough would fall back and lose the lead to Petty, leading to Darrell and Richard to battle it out. Darrell would take the lead on lap 452, but on lap 480 Petty would retake the lead and lead the rest of the remaining laps that day to win by 6 seconds

Top 10 finishers
Pos.	No.	Driver	Make
1	43	Richard Petty	Dodge
2	17	Darrell Waltrip	Chevrolet
3	11	Cale Yarborough	Chevrolet
4	16	Bobby Allison	AMC
5	71	Dave Marcis	Dodge
6	72	Benny Parsons	Chevrolet
7	63	Jimmy Hensley	Chevrolet
8	90	Dick Brooks	Ford
9	96	Richard Childress	Chevrolet
10	48	James Hylton	Chevrolet

=== Round 10: Winston 500 ===
Tragedy blackened Buddy Baker's first win since 1973 and the first win for team owner Bud Moore since 1966. Richard Petty's wheel well caught fire while leading and he pitted; his brother in law Randy Owens fitted a hose to a pressurized water tank; the tank exploded, nearly landing on Petty's roof, and Owens was killed. Baker edged Pearson at the stripe while Dick Brooks and Darrell Waltrip had sparkling efforts in finishing out the top four. The race lead changed 51 times among 13 drivers.

Top 10 finishers
Pos.	No.	Driver	Make
1	15	Buddy Baker	Ford
2	21	David Pearson	Mercury
3	90	Dick Brooks	Ford
4	17	Darrell Waltrip	Chevrolet
5	14	Coo Coo Marlin	Chevrolet
6	95	Harry Jefferson	Ford
7	41	Grant Adcox	Chevrolet
8	37	Bruce Jacobi	Chevrolet
9	60	Joe Mihalic	Chevrolet
10	96	Richard Childress	Chevrolet

=== Round 11: Music City 420 ===
The Music City 420 took place on May 10 at Nashville Speedway. The race had two contenders: Darrell Waltrip and Cale Yarborough. Darrell had the pole and led 47 laps before Cale took it away on lap 48. He then proceeded to lead the next 273 laps, with Darrell behind. However, Cale's car proceeded to have engine problems and retired on lap 322, thus handing the lead back over to Darrell. Darrell, who had a 2 lap lead on the next car behind, Benny Parsons, cruised on to a victory, his first of 84 that is second in post-1972 NASCAR scheduling that led to being part of the 2012 NASCAR Hall of Fame.

Top 10 finishers
Pos.	No.	Driver	Make
1	17	Darrell Waltrip	Chevrolet
2	72	Benny Parsons	Chevrolet
3	14	Coo Coo Marlin	Chevrolet
4	71	Dave Marcis	Dodge
5	24	Cecil Gordon	Chevrolet
6	68	Alton Jones	Chevrolet
7	43	Richard Petty	Dodge
8	05	David Sisco	Chevrolet
9	48	James Hylton	Chevrolet
10	30	Walter Ballard	Chevrolet

=== Round 12: Mason-Dixon 500 ===
The 1975 Mason Dixon 500 took place on May 18 at Dover Downs International Speedway. Once again, the race had two contenders; David Pearson and Benny Parsons. In the middle parts of the race, they would swap the lead with each other frequently. However, Parsons would have to retire at lap 360 due to engine problems. David Pearson cruised to a 7 lap margin victory over Cecil Gordon.

Top 10 finishers
Pos.	No.	Driver	Make
1	21	David Pearson	Mercury
2	24	Cecil Gordon	Chevrolet
3	43	Richard Petty	Dodge
4	48	James Hylton	Chevrolet
5	05	David Sisco	Chevrolet
6	14	Coo Coo Marlin	Chevrolet
7	93	Kenny Brighthill	Ford
8	47	Bruce Hill	Chevrolet
9	19	Henley Gray	Chevrolet
10	25	Jabe Thomas	Chevrolet

=== Round 13: World 600 ===
Petty won a long-distance race at Charlotte Motor Speedway for the first time in his career (he'd won a 100-mile qualifying race there in 1961) as he led 234 laps and finished a lap ahead of Cale Yarborough. The Junior Johnson team by this point had secured Holly Farms sponsorship, allowing the team to contest the remainder of the season. Future seven-time champion Dale Earnhardt made his Cup debut in this race.

Top 10 finishers
Pos.	No.	Driver	Make
1	43	Richard Petty	Dodge
2	11	Cale Yarborough	Chevrolet
3	21	David Pearson	Mercury
4	17	Darrell Waltrip	Chevrolet
5	15	Buddy Baker	Ford
6	28	Charlie Glotzbach	Chevrolet
7	90	Dick Brooks	Ford
8	98	Richie Panch	Chevrolet
9	88	Donnie Allison	Chevrolet
10	30	Walter Ballard	Chevrolet

=== Round 14: Tuborg 400 ===
Top 10 finishers
Pos.	No.	Driver	Make
1	43	Richard Petty	Dodge
2	16	Bobby Allison	AMC
3	72	Benny Parsons	Chevrolet
4	96W	Ray Elder	Dodge
5	71	Dave Marcis	Dodge
6	70	J.D. McDuffie	Chevrolet
7	37	Chuck Wahl	Chevrolet
8	73	Bill Schmitt	Chevrolet
9	96	Richard Childress	Chevrolet
10	89	Gene Riniker	Chevrolet

=== Round 15: Michigan 400 ===
In a highly competitive race that saw 44 lead changes, Pearson edged Petty for his second win of the season while Dave Marcis and Cale Yarborough finished third and fourth; the top four combined to lead 180 of 200 laps. Petty increased his point lead to 441 over Marcis.

Top 10 finishers
Pos.	No.	Driver	Make
1	21	David Pearson	Mercury
2	43	Richard Petty	Dodge
3	71	Dave Marcis	Dodge
4	11	Cale Yarborough	Chevrolet
5	17	Darrell Waltrip	Chevrolet
6	98	Richie Panch	Chevrolet
7	90	Dick Brooks	Ford
8	05	David Sisco	Chevrolet
9	48	James Hylton	Chevrolet
10	96	Richard Childress	Chevrolet

=== Round 16: Firecracker 400 ===
Petty struggled during the weekend, qualifying only at 180 MPH but drafted past Buddy Baker with thirteen laps to go. Donnie Allison finished a distant fifth after winning the pole and was released from the DiGard Racing team and replaced by Darrell Waltrip, who finished fourth.

Top 10 finishers
Pos.	No.	Driver	Make
1	43	Richard Petty	Dodge
2	15	Buddy Baker	Ford
3	71	Dave Marcis	Dodge
4	17	Darrell Waltrip	Chevrolet
5	88	Donnie Allison	Chevrolet
6	90	Dick Brooks	Ford
7	47	Bruce Hill	Chevrolet
8	72	Benny Parsons	Chevrolet
9	65	Carl Adams	Ford
10	35	Darel Dieringer	Ford

=== Round 17: Nashville 420 ===
The 1975 Nashville 420 took place on July 20 at Nashville Speedway. Cale Yarborough dominated the race after passing Walter Ballard on lap 50, leading the rest of the laps afterwards and winning.

Top 10 finishers
Pos.	No.	Driver	Make
1	11	Cale Yarborough	Chevrolet
2	43	Richard Petty	Dodge
3	71	Dave Marcis	Dodge
4	72	Benny Parsons	Chevrolet
5	24	Cecil Gordon	Chevrolet
6	96	Richard Childress	Chevrolet
7	05	David Sisco	Chevrolet
8	65	Carl Adams	Ford
9	70	J.D. McDuffie	Chevrolet
10	10	Elmo Langley	Ford

=== Round 18: Purolator 500 ===
The inaugural race at Pocono International Raceway for the Cup Series featured controversy at the end. The lead changed 43 times despite a ninety-minute delay for rain near halfway. Pearson took the lead on Lap 186 of 200, but in the final seven laps the Wood Brothers Mercury smoked heavily, to where by Lap 198 it was lapping its own smoke. At that point NASCAR black-flagged Pearson in what was a moot point, because the black flag for mechanical reasons was given on Lap 199 with a three lap period to obey the flag and there were only two laps to go. It was the third win of the season for Pearson.

Current rules state a black flag assessed at the end of the race results in a time penalty, primarily for driving standards or track limits. This was assessed on Ricky Rudd at Sonoma in 1991 (inappropriate contact), Chase Briscoe at Indianapolis in 2021 (track limits, then inappropriate contact when under penalty), or Shane van Gisbergen at Austin in a second national series race in 2024 (exceeded track limits in Maggots-Becketts-Chapel on final lap).

Top 10 finishers
Pos.	No.	Driver	Make
1	21	David Pearson	Mercury
2	43	Richard Petty	Dodge
3	15	Buddy Baker	Ford
4	72	Benny Parsons	Chevrolet
5	96	Richard Childress	Chevrolet
6	65	Carl Adams	Ford
7	14	Coo Coo Marlin	Chevrolet
8	47	Bruce Hill	Chevrolet
9	48	James Hylton	Chevrolet
10	24	Cecil Gordon	Chevrolet

=== Round 19: Talladega 500 ===
Multiple tragedies surrounded the seventh running of NASCAR's late-summer 500-miler at Talladega. Gene Lovell, crew chief for Grant Adcox, died of a heart attack; Adcox withdrew and first alternate Tiny Lund got his starting spot. Mark Donohue drove a Porsche IMSA racer to a new closed-course speed record of 221 MPH (breaking A. J. Foyt's 217 MPH record in his Indycar the previous year) before pole qualifying; Donohue was killed ten days later during the Austrian Grand Prix. The 500 itself was scheduled for August 10 but was rained out until the 17th. Early in the race a six-car melee erupted and Lund was smashed through the driver side by another car; he succumbed to massive internal injuries. Dick Brooks then survived a furious tumble down the backstretch in the middle of the race. Buddy Baker held off Richard Petty at the stripe after 60 lead changes among 17 drivers.

Top 10 finishers
Pos.	No.	Driver	Make
1	15	Buddy Baker	Ford
2	43	Richard Petty	Dodge
3	28	Donnie Allison	Chevrolet
4	71	Dave Marcis	Dodge
5	14	Coo Coo Marlin	Chevrolet
6	72	Benny Parsons	Chevrolet
7	48	James Hylton	Chevrolet
8	18	Joe Frasson	Chevrolet
9	60	Jackie Rogers	Chevrolet
10	24	Cecil Gordon	Chevrolet

=== Round 20: Champion Spark Plug 400 ===
A six-car crash pierced the backstretch guardrail and stopped the race for half an hour. A late caution set off a five-lap shootout as Petty and Pearson fought for the lead; the lead changed on every lap before Petty drafted past Pearson for the win. Cale Yarborough survived a spin after colliding with Dave Marcis and finished third; the two exchanged words after the race.

Top 10 finishers
Pos.	No.	Driver	Make
1	43	Richard Petty	Dodge
2	21	David Pearson	Mercury
3	11	Cale Yarborough	Chevrolet
4	16	Bobby Allison	AMC
5	71	Dave Marcis	Dodge
6	15	Buddy Baker	Ford
7	88	Darrell Waltrip	Chevrolet
8	47	Bruce Hill	Chevrolet
9	63	Terry Bivins	Chevrolet
10	7	Dean Dalton	Ford

=== Round 21: Southern 500 ===
Bobby Allison, despite breaking a suspension piece in the final 50 laps, completed a season sweep at Darlington as he outlasted Richard Petty, who competed despite illness and heat, needing relief help from Dave Marcis.

Top 10 finishers
Pos.	No.	Driver	Make
1	16	Bobby Allison	AMC
2	43	Richard Petty	Dodge
3	05	David Sisco	Chevrolet
4	31	Jim Vandiver	Dodge
5	47	Bruce Hill	Chevrolet
6	24	Cecil Gordon	Chevrolet
7	96	Richard Childress	Chevrolet
8	33	Dick May	Chevrolet
9	37	Bruce Jacobi	Chevrolet
10	64	Elmo Langley	Ford

=== Round 22: Delaware 500 ===
Petty put the entire field two laps down, but with 150 to go a backmarker's blown engine sent debris under the STP Dodge and snapped a tie rod. Petty's crew needed eight laps to fix the problem and he restarted six laps behind Lennie Pond and Cale Yarborough. Pond fell out and Cale fell back; Petty kept lapping the field until he got back onto the lead lap; Buddy Arrington then came to a stop, necessitating a late yellow. Petty won handily and Dick Brooks finished second, upset because Arrington had purchased a transporter from Petty; said Brooks, "I guess Arrington needed that truck paid for."

Top 10 finishers
Pos.	No.	Driver	Make
1	43	Richard Petty	Dodge
2	90	Dick Brooks	Ford
3	72	Benny Parsons	Chevrolet
4	11	Cale Yarborough	Chevrolet
5	47	Bruce Hill	Chevrolet
6	96	Richard Childress	Chevrolet
7	48	James Hylton	Chevrolet
8	70	J.D. McDuffie	Chevrolet
9	7	Dean Dalton	Ford
10	40	D.K. Ulrich	Chevrolet

=== Round 23: Wilkes 400 ===
Top 10 finishers
Pos.	No.	Driver	Make
1	43	Richard Petty	Dodge
2	11	Cale Yarborough	Chevrolet
3	88	Darrell Waltrip	Chevrolet
4	15	Buddy Baker	Ford
5	54	Lennie Pond	Chevrolet
6	72	Benny Parsons	Chevrolet
7	70	J.D. McDuffie	Chevrolet
8	96	Richard Childress	Chevrolet
9	31	Jim Vandiver	Dodge
10	47	Bruce Hill	Chevrolet

=== Round 24: Old Dominion 500 ===
Richard Petty fell out with rearend failure and pole-sitter Cale Yarborough crashed after leading 272 laps. Darrell Waltrip led before blowing his engine and Dave Marcis took the win, his first Winston Cup win and the first for Harry Hyde's #71 Dodge since 1973.

Top 10 finishers
Pos.	No.	Driver	Make
1	71	Dave Marcis	Dodge
2	72	Benny Parsons	Chevrolet
3	16	Bobby Allison	AMC
4	96	Richard Childress	Chevrolet
5	98	Richie Panch	Chevrolet
6	90	Dick Brooks	Ford
7	65	Carl Adams	Ford
8	31	Jim Vandiver	Dodge
9	24	Cecil Gordon	Chevrolet
10	64	Elmo Langley	Ford

=== Round 25: National 500 ===
Richard Petty broke out of a tight battle and led the final 111 laps for the sweep at Charlotte Motor Speedway. The win all but clinched his sixth Winston Cup Grand National title.

Top 10 finishers
Pos.	No.	Driver	Make
1	43	Richard Petty	Dodge
2	21	David Pearson	Mercury
3	15	Buddy Baker	Ford
4	72	Benny Parsons	Chevrolet
5	24	Cecil Gordon	Chevrolet
6	48	James Hylton	Chevrolet
7	35	Darel Dieringer	Ford
8	96	Richard Childress	Chevrolet
9	70	J.D. McDuffie	Chevrolet
10	64	Elmo Langley	Ford

=== Round 26: Capital City 500 ===
Richard Petty broke a piston 34 laps in but still clinched his sixth title; the Petty Enterprises team had begun experimenting with new parts in anticipation of the 1976 season. Darrell Waltrip made up two laps to post his second win of 1975 and the first for DiGard Racing.

Top 10 finishers
Pos.	No.	Driver	Make
1	88	Darrell Waltrip	Chevrolet
2	54	Lennie Pond	Chevrolet
3	90	Dick Brooks	Ford
4	24	Cecil Gordon	Chevrolet
5	70	J.D. McDuffie	Chevrolet
6	48	James Hylton	Chevrolet
7	64	Elmo Langley	Ford
8	47	Bruce Hill	Chevrolet
9	14	Coo Coo Marlin	Chevrolet
10	25	Jabe Thomas	Chevrolet

=== Round 27: American 500 ===
Top 10 finishers
Pos.	No.	Driver	Make
1	11	Cale Yarborough	Chevrolet
2	16	Bobby Allison	AMC
3	71	Dave Marcis	Dodge
4	54	Lennie Pond	Chevrolet
5	28	A.J. Foyt	Chevrolet
6	47	Bruce Hill	Chevrolet
7	3	Bobby Issac	Chevrolet
8	31	Jim Vandiver	Dodge
9	27	Donnie Allison	Chevrolet
10	14	Coo Coo Marlin	Chevrolet

=== Round 28: Volunteer 500 ===
Top 10 finishers
Pos.	No.	Driver	Make
1	43	Richard Petty	Dodge
2	54	Lennie Pond	Chevrolet
3	88	Darrell Waltrip	Chevrolet
4	71	Dave Marcis	Dodge
5	72	Benny Parsons	Chevrolet
6	90	Dick Brooks	Ford
7	14	Coo Coo Marlin	Chevrolet
8	24	Cecil Gordon	Chevrolet
9	48	James Hylton	Chevrolet
10	47	Bruce Hill	Chevrolet

=== Round 29: Dixie 500 ===
Top 10 finishers
Pos.	No.	Driver	Make
1	15	Buddy Baker	Ford
2	71	Dave Marcis	Dodge
3	43	Richard Petty	Dodge
4	21	David Pearson	Mercury
5	11	Cale Yarborough	Chevrolet
6	54	Lennie Pond	Chevrolet
7	90	Dick Brooks	Ford
8	14	Coo Coo Marlin	Chevrolet
9	24	Cecil Gordon	Chevrolet
10	8	Ed Negre	Dodge

=== Round 30: Los Angeles Times 500 ===
Buddy Baker initially was not entered in NASCAR's season finale but Bud Moore had secured sponsorship from Norris Industries so Baker flew out to LA and led 148 laps, winning by 30 seconds over Pearson. Richard Petty led but fell out for the second straight year with engine failure; it was also his fourth DNF in his last seven races.

Top 10 finishers
Pos.	No.	Driver	Make
1	15	Buddy Baker	Ford
2	21	David Pearson	Mercury
3	71	Dave Marcis	Dodge
4	11	Cale Yarborough	Chevrolet
5	16	Bobby Allison	AMC
6	54	Lennie Pond	Chevrolet
7	38	Jimmy Insolo	Chevrolet
8	90	Dick Brooks	Ford
9	48	James Hylton	Chevrolet
10	96	Richard Childress	Chevrolet

== Full Drivers’ Championship ==
(key) Bold – Pole position awarded by time. Italics – Pole position set by owner's points. * – Most laps led.

Pos.	Driver	RIV	DAY	RCH	CAR	BRI	ATL	NWS	DAR	MAR	TAL	NSV	DOV	CLT	RIV	MCH	DAY	NSV	POC	TAL	MCH	DAR	DOV	NWS	MAR	CLT	RCH	CAR	BRI	ATL	ONT	Pts
1	Richard Petty	7	7	**1***	3	1*	**1***	1*	26	1*	19	7	3	1*	1	2	1	2	2	2	1	2*	1*	**1***	22	1*	28	35	1*	3	16	4783
2	Dave Marcis	4	6	16	24	8	27	4	4	5	13	4	20	34	5	3	3	3	25	**4**	5	24	**30**	27	1	26	23	**3**	4	**2**	3	4061
3	James Hylton	6	10	14	8	5	13	11	8	10	33	9	4	20	13	9	11	11	9	7	17	23	7	13	13	6	6	15	9	22	9	3914
4	Benny Parsons	24	1	3	22	2	28	6	6	**6**	43	2	23	39	3	34	8	**4**	4	6	34	20	3	6	2	4	**18**	24	5	19	34	3820
5	Richard Childress	11	18	9	6	9	15	17	22	9	10	16	16	23	9	10	13	6	5	13	31	7	6	8	4	8	21	21	13	12	10	3818
6	Cecil Gordon	3	15	7	20	4	8	9	21	23	21	5	2	37	18	33	29	5	10	10	13	6	29	16	9	5	4	30	8	9	19	3702
7	Darrell Waltrip		26	15	21	6	5	**7**	2	2	4	**1**	22	4	21	5	4	28	34	42	7	34	27	3	17	24	1	32	3	36		3462
8	Elmo Langley	5		5	12	17	17	27	20	11	14	15	12	24	12	14	25	10	24	14	18	10	24	14	10	10	7	23	10	15	22	3399
9	Cale Yarborough		3		1*	20	22	2	36	3	40	14*	27	2		**4**	26	1*	35	41	3	19	4	2	**19***	19	26	1*	**20**	5	4	3295
10	Dick Brooks		22	4	4	19	4	8	25	8	3		29	7		7	6			38	20	26	2	11	6	35	3	29	6	7	8	3182
11	Walter Ballard	31	25	19	17	18	24	10	18	15	12	10	25	10	24	11	31	18	13	48	11	25	14	25	14	41	15	11	12	17	20	3151
12	Frank Warren			17	18	12	12	12	16	18	24	12	15	19	17	16	17	16	16	17	26	14	16	24	12	14	14	14	22	25	17	3148
13	David Sisco		21	8	14	7	31	23	28	26	16	8	5	27		8	33	7	19	27	12	3	17	19	20	15	24	26	16	29	12	3116
14	David Pearson	2	4*		2		3		**7***	20	2		**1***	**3**		1*	20		1*	39	**2**	**27**	26		23	**2**		25		4	**2**	3057
15	Buddy Baker		20		**25**	**3**	2	3	19	19	**1***		11	5			2*		3	1*	6	28	33	4	18	3		28	24	1*	1*	3050
16	Bruce Hill **(R)**		32	11	5		23	16	15		47	23	8	18		30	7	13	8	31	8	5	5	10	25	27	8	6	10	13	26	3002
17	Ed Negre	9	14	10	7	13		19	31	13	32	24	31	32	28	27	12	15	14	18	33	30	11	17	21	30	22	12	11	10	40	2982
18	J. D. McDuffie	14	33					13	11	28	29	11	18	11	6	18	22	9	27	45	28	33	8	7	30	9	5	20	30	18	21	2745
19	Buddy Arrington			6	9	15		20	10	14	38	28	13	26		15	21	25	12	24	22	17	18	18	11	17	12	13	15	20		2654
20	Coo Coo Marlin		17		26		7		5		5	3	6	40		12	34	26	7	5	35	39	31	12	29	42	9	10	7	8		2584
21	Lennie Pond		19	2	23		10	5	27	25	26		33	36			38			32		21	20	5	24	22	2*	4	2	6	6	2540
22	Jabe Thomas			12	27	14	DNQ	15	35	22	25	19	10					21	20	16	23	12	13	26	15	20	10	18	18			2252
23	Carl Adams **(R)**	34	DNQ		13		16	18	12	12	44			DNQ	23	21	9	8	6	23	29	DNQ		20	7		11		14	16	28	2182
24	Bobby Allison	**1***	2				30		1	4	35				**2***	22	35		**31**	29	4	1	28		3	31		2		26	5	2181
25	Bruce Jacobi **(R)**		12						9		8			16		25	32	19	11	12	15	9	22				20	16		14		1732
26	Dean Dalton				10				32	30	39		17	17		19				11	10	32	9	15			19		29	32		1486
27	D. K. Ulrich					11							30			26	DNQ	20	15	25	21	16	10	23	28		13	31	27	33	13	1453
28	Donnie Allison		**28**		28		6		3	21	42		28	9		35	**5**			3						33		9		27		1376
29	Richie Panch		8				34			17	49			8		6	28		33	43	25				5	25				35	36	1243
30	Jim Vandiver		35				26				27			15			14			33		4		9	8	23	27	8		28		1228
31	Bill Champion		DNQ	21					34	16	11	18	19	29				30		30		29		21			25		17			1218
32	Earle Canavan			13	31	23		25	17		17	17	34						29		32	35	25									1062
33	Grant Adcox **(R)**		37				21				7					29	36	27		34	14	13				16			25			1020
34	Joe Mihalic **(R)**		34				33	14	13		9						27		21	26		DNQ	32		16							957
35	Joe Frasson		DNQ			22					18		14	DNQ		31				8			36			13		37	26			939
36	Travis Tiller **(R)**				16	21		21		24	23	26	24	30		23													28			922
37	Rick Newsom		31	22	19		20	24	33		41	13				36							12									877
38	Ferrel Harris **(R)**		16				11		14		45			DNQ		13	DNQ			15	16	18						22		24		797
39	Henley Gray					16	19						9	28							27	36	19	29				33				747
40	G. C. Spencer		9				36		24		22			38			39			49		31				32						634
41	Dick May **(R)**		QL	20									35				23		17		19	8	37					17	21			631
42	Earl Brooks								QL			22	26					23	26	22		QL	34				17					534
43	Neil Castles		DNQ	18				22	30									29								40		34		31		529
44	Jackie Rogers													14			19		30	9	36	38				29		36				502
45	Harry Jefferson	32					9				6			21												28						455
46	Tommy Gale		23														18		28			22	35									437
47	Ricky Rudd				11	10	25	28					QL																			431
48	Bobby Isaac				29									35												37		7	23	30		405
49	Dick Skillen				30				23					25								37						27				389
50	Ray Elder	13													4																25	372
51	Randy Tissot		29						29		28						16			50		15	15									364
52	Harold Miller										34					28				36	24	QL								34		347
53	Jimmy Insolo	33													27											39					7	343
54	Darel Dieringer													12			10			37						7						337
55	Bob Burcham		13																							18				23		327
56	Chuck Wahl	17													7																35	322
57	Chuck Bown **(R)**	27													34										26	12					38	319
58	Bill Schmitt	18													8																33	315
59	Baxter Price											20						22	18													309
60	Bill Hollar																						23	22			16					306
61	Skip Manning						14				15						15					11										297
62	Alton Jones											6						12														277
63	Richard D. Brown									29		25						17						30								261
64	Gary Matthews	8													15																	260
65	Don Puskarich	12													32																37	246
66	Sonny Easley	21													30																39	224
67	Glenn Francis	25													11																	218
68	Johnny Ray										48					24	30			40												207
69	Hershel McGriff	10	30												19											11					31	205
70	Jim Boyd														14																27	203
71	Hugh Pearson	23																													18	203
72	Bill Osborne	16													26																	200
73	Pete Torres	26													16																	200
74	George Follmer		24												29																	167
75	Charlie Griffin							26																28								164
76	Kenny Brightbill												7																			146
77	Terry Bivins																				9		21									138
78	Gene Riniker														10																	134
79	Don Hall																														11	130
80	Marty Robbins		39								31																					121
81	Clyde Dagit		DNQ		15																											118
82	Larry Esau	15																														118
83	Richard White	19																														106
84	Billy Hagan																			19												106
85	John Banks										50					20														21		103
86	Jeff Handy																			20												103
87	Johnny Kieper														20																24	103
88	Don Reynolds	20																														103
89	A. J. Reno																			21												100
90	Carl Joiner														22																	97
91	Doc Faustina																		22													97
92	Ron Esau	22																														97
93	Carl Van Horn																		23													94
94	Paul Dean Holt											21						24														91
95	Eddie Bradshaw														25																	88
96	Red Farmer		QL								37									44												83
97	Jimmy Hensley									7															27							82
98	Joey Arrington									27		27	32																			82
99	Bill Ward																			28												79
100	Chuck Little	28																														79
101	G. T. Tallas	29	DNQ																													76
102	Dan Daughtry		38								46																					74
103	Dick Bown	30																														73
104	Harry Gant													31																		70
105	John Soares Jr.														31																	70
106	Jim Thirkettle																														32	67
107	George Wiltshire																		32													67
108	Ted Fritz														33																	64
109	Randy Bethea													33																		64
110	Charlie Glotzbach													6												36						60
111	Ivan Baldwin	35													35																	58
112	Dick Trickle		40																													55
113	H. B. Bailey		DNQ																			40										43
114	Warren Tope		40				18																									43
115	Tiny Lund		DNQ																	46												25
116	Terry Link		DNQ																	47												22
117	A. J. Foyt		11				35										24				30*					21		5			14	
118	Johnny Rutherford		27				32										40									34						
119	Ramo Stott		5								30																					
120	Jody Ridley						29																							11		
121	Tom Williams										20						QL														23	
122	Neil Bonnett																	14		35												
123	Salt Walther															17	37													DNQ		
124	Earl Ross													13																		
125	Don Hoffman																														15	
126	Glen McDuffie																											19				
127	John Harkins												21																			
128	Dale Earnhardt													22																		
129	Roy Smith																														29	
130	John Martin																														30	
131	Mel Larson															32																
132	Gordon Johncock										36																					
133	Dennis Wilson	DNQ													DNQ																	
134	Tom Culbertson		DNQ																													
135	Joe Booher		DNQ																													
136	Jimmy Crowe		DNQ																													
137	Bill Dennis													DNQ																		
138	Bill Elliott																													DNQ		
Pos.	Driver	RIV	DAY	RCH	CAR	BRI	ATL	NWS	DAR	MAR	TAL	NSV	DOV	CLT	RIV	MCH	DAY	NSV	POC	TAL	MCH	DAR	DOV	NWS	MAR	CLT	RCH	CAR	BRI	ATL	ONT	Pts

== See also ==
- 1975 NASCAR Winston West Series
- NASCAR Goes Country
