= Freddy Adam =

American Dirt Modified racing driver (born 1931)

- Born: Alfred A. Adam; January 31, 1931 Kutztown, Pennsylvania, U.S.
- Died: February 1, 2013 (aged 82)
- Retired: 1986

Modified racing career
- Debut season: 1949
- Championships: 4

Championship titles
- 1964 Langhorne National Open

Alfred A. "Freddy" Adam (January 31, 1931 – February 1, 2013) was an American stock car racing driver. Adam centered his racing career on the Mid-Atlantic states, and won three track championships at Hatfield Speedway, as well as the final Modified title at the Dorney Park Speedway in Allentown, both in Pennsylvania.

== Racing career ==
Adam drove for 57 car owners and successfully competed at more than 40 tracks, including Orange County Fair Speedway in Middletown, New York, and Pennsylvania's Evergreen Speedway in St. Johns, Langhorne Speedway, Nazareth Speedway, Penn National Speedway in Grantville, Williams Grove Speedway in Mechanicsburg, and Yellow Jacket Speedway in Philadelphia. He was the only driver to have raced at the Reading Fairgrounds Speedway in every season that Modifieds competed.

Adam was inducted into the Eastern Motorsports Press Association and the Northeast Dirt Modified Halls of Fame
