= Stan Ploski Jr. =

American Dirt Modified racing driver (born 1944)

- Born: February 27, 1944 (age 82) Ringoes, New Jersey, U.S.
- Retired: 1999

Modified racing career
- Years active: 1962-1990
- Car number: 24, 27, 65, 74, 707
- Championships: 5
- Wins: 173

Previous series
- 1972-2017: Sprint Car, Midget Car

Championship titles
- 1971, 1973 New Jersey State Modified Champion

Stan Ploski Jr. (born February 27, 1944) is an American retired Dirt Modified racing driver. Ploski had a 16-year winning streak at Flemington Speedway, New Jersey (1966–1981), and captured 74 modified features at the venue over his career.

== Racing career ==
Ploski won the 1962 New Jersey State Novice Championship in a twin car to his father Stan Sr.'s 1937 Chevrolet Sportsman coupe at the Vineland Speedway in New Jersey. After winning 18 straight Sportsman races at the Flemington Speedway in 1963, he was forced to move up to the Modified Division. He went on to compete successfully at the Northeast's toughest venues, including Five Mile Point Speedway, Fonda Speedway, Lebanon Valley Speedway, and the Syracuse Mile in New York, Langhorne Speedway, Nazareth Speedway, and Reading Fairgrounds Speedway in Pennsylvania, and East Windsor Speedway and Trenton Speedway in New Jersey.

Ploski first retired from racing in 1990 but returned to the cockpit as recent as 2017 to race a sprint car at New Jersey's New Egypt Speedway. He was inducted into the Eastern Motorsports Press Association and the Northeast Dirt Modified Halls of Fame.
