= Jackie McLaughlin =

American Dirt Modified racing driver (born 1933)

- Born: John Henry McLaughlin; October 11, 1933 Camden, New Jersey, U.S.
- Died: August 23, 1964 (aged 30)
- Debut season: 1950

Modified racing career
- Years active: 1955-1964
- Car number: 2, 026, 44, 83, 300
- Championships: 4

Previous series
- 1950-1964: Sprint car racing

John “Jackie” McLaughlin (October 11, 1933 – August 23, 1964) was an American racing driver from the Thorofare section of West Deptford Township, New Jersey. Although best remembered for his exploits in a dirt-track Modified, he won several United Racing Club Sprint car races and was their 1954 “Rookie of the Year”.

== Racing career ==
McLaughlin started his racing career in 1950 at the age of 17 on the dirt at New Jersey's Atco Speedway and Alcyon Speedway in Pitman. By 1955, his brother-in-law, Budd Olsen, convinced him to try the Modifieds, and McLaughlin immediately won at Nazareth Speedway in Pennsylvania and a track championship at Alcyon. He went on to compete successfully at the renowned tracks of the Mid-Atlantic, including Georgetown Speedway and Kent-Sussex Raceway in Delaware, Reading Fairgrounds Speedway in Pennsylvania, and Vineland Speedway in New Jersey. McLaughlin entered the Daytona 300 in both 1959 and 1960, and claimed the 1956, 1957, and 1962 track championships at the Flemington Speedway in New Jersey.

McLaughlin sustained a fatal injury in a racing accident at Nazareth in August 1964. He was inducted into the Eastern Motorsports Press Association and the Northeast Dirt Modified Halls of Fame.
