= Bobby Gerhart Sr. =

American racing driver (1935-2004)

- Born: E. Robert Gerhart; October 4, 1935 Jonestown, Pennsylvania, U.S.
- Died: May 26, 2004 (aged 68)

Motorsport career
- Debut season: 1954
- Championships: 3
- Wins: 300+

Robert Gerhart Sr. (October 4, 1935 – May 26, 2004) was an American race car driver who competed in Modified, Supermodified, and Sprint car competition. He won three track championships and over 300 feature races in a career that spanned three decades.

== Racing career ==
Gerhart began racing stock cars in Pennsylvania at Silver Springs Speedway in 1954, and later mastered sprint cars and supermodifieds, becoming the 1967 supermodified champion at Susquehanna Speedway. He claimed a total of 42 victories at Reading Fairgrounds Speedway and was the modified champion in 1969 and 1970.

Gerhart won feature events at additional Pennsylvania tracks including the Circle M in Auburn, Hilltop in Myerstown, Lincoln Speedway, Penn National in Grantville, Selinsgrove Speedway, and Williams Grove Speedway in Mechanicsburg.

Gerhart was inducted into Northeast Dirt Modified Hall of Fame and the Eastern Motorsport Press Association Hall of Fame, as well as local Pennsylvania sports halls in Lebanon and York Counties.
