= Reading Fairgrounds Speedway =

Race track in Pennsylvania, US

Reading Fairgrounds Speedway (1924–1979) was a one half mile dirt/clay modified race track located in Muhlenberg Township, Berks County, Pennsylvania. The track opened September 24, 1924 and ran until June 29, 1979. It featured a regular weekly series of modified, sportsman modified, and late model stock car racing. The racetrack was replaced by the Fairgrounds Square Mall, which opened in 1980, closed in 2018, and was demolished in 2020.

== History ==
Lindy V. Vicari was a stock-car racing promoter and operator of the Reading Fairgrounds from 1955 until 1979.

== All-Time Victory Leaders ==
Kenny Brightbill is the Reading Fairgrounds Speedway all-time wins record holder with 135 track victories. Tommy Hinnershitz had wins at the track early in his career.

		READING FAIRGROUNDS MODIFIED VICTORIES			
compiled by Bill Braga					
	DRIVER		TOTAL	1ST WIN	LAST WIN
	Kenny Brightbill		135	4/17/70	6/24/79
	Gerald Chamberlain		92	7/26/68	4/1/79
	Dick Tobias		90	6/4/65	11/20/77
	Al Tasnady		52	3/31/63	6/27/71
	Bobby Gerhart		41	3/24/68	3/25/77
	Jackie Evans		20	7/30/65	5/10/70
	Freddy Adam		20	6/5/64	6/30/78
	Johnny Botz		17	4/3/71	9/7/75
	Jim Keppley		17	8/8/69	10/22/77
	Kenny Weld		15	3/23/74	7/3/77
	Bobby Blatt		14	7/4/69	8/6/71
	Jimmy Horton		14	6/19/77	5/20/79
	Dave Kelly		13	4/9/77	6/29/79
	Frankie Schneider		11	10/21/62	10/17/65
	Buzzie Reutimann		11	6/28/68	10/1/71
	Jackie McClaughlin		9	5/5/63	8/21/64
	Budd Olsen		9	4/24/64	8/19/72
	Harry Moore		8	7/10/64	4/26/74
	Red Coffin		7	5/29/70	5/18/75
	Meme Desantis		7	8/5/77	6/25/78
	Bobby Hauer		7	5/15/70	8/20/78
	Rags Carter		6	7/9/65	7/22/66
	Stan Ploski		6	9/3/65	5/26/68
	Carl Van Horn		6	8/9/68	4/10/71
	Jim Kirk		6	4/8/72	8/21/77
	John Kozak		6	5/27/77	10/8/78
	Laudan Potts		5	8/8/69	9/15/72
	Bob Malzahn		4	10/22/61	5/12/67
	Hal Browning		4	8/8/71	6/30/74
	Glenn Fitzcharles		4	9/3/71	10/25/75
	Gary Gollub		4	7/10/77	7/21/78
	Billy Deskovick		3	10/6/63	10/3/65
	Tommy McAndrews		3	8/23/63	3/12/67
	Larry Voss		3	8/28/64	9/3/67
	Whip Mulligan		3	7/17/64	10/15/67
	Bill Williams		3	5/9/65	9/13/69
	Billy Osmun		3	9/21/75	10/18/75
	Russ Delp		2	4/19/63	4/5/64
	Shorty Kerschner		2	5/15/64	5/6/66
	Donnie Varner		2	4/6/73	4/13/73
	Don Kreitz		2	10/1/71	7/22/75
	Jim Baker		2	6/16/74	9/5/75
	Walt Olsen		2	4/30/76	9/10/76
	Jay Stong		2	8/26/77	10/22/77
	Mike Meals		2	5/21/78	7/9/78
	Frank Cozze		2	8/7/77	7/14/78
	Tom Hager		2	9/24/78	10/22/78
	Vince Conrad		1	8/30/63	
	Leon Manchester		1	6/19/64	
	Whitey Kerschner		1	6/17/66	
	Bob Siedel		1	9/9/66	
	Will Cagle		1	6/23/67	
	Bob Pickell		1	9/4/67	
	Eddie Pratt		1	3/23/69	
	Ralph Smith		1	4/4/70	
	Dave Marburger		1	4/11/70	
	Dizzie Dean		1	7/5/70	
	Bobby Braxton		1	6/22/75	
	Ronnie Tobias		1	7/14/75	
	Dick Quallio		1	9/3/76	
	Tommy Long		1	4/15/77	
	Freddy Brightbill		1	6/24/77	
	Billy Ellis		1	7/22/77	
	Junior Mikosz		1	7/7/78	
	Ron Tobias		1	9/17/78	
	65 Drivers		716		

,

== Reading Modified Top Ten Performance Index ==
	CAR						TOP						TOP		
DRIVER	#'s	1	2	3	4	5	FIVES	6	7	8	9	10	TENS	HTS	CONSI
BRIGHTBILL, Kenny		135	80	48	27	13	303	16	13	8	5	7	352	128	18
KEPPLEY, Jim		17	38	54	39	37	185	38	29	18	32	15	317	90	28
TOBIAS, Dick		90	62	43	36	18	249	21	9	16	10	3	308	74	26
CHAMBERLAIN, Gerald		92	52	34	34	21	233	17	14	14	11	5	294	71	41
GERHART, Bobby		41	59	46	35	27	208	28	16	11	12	12	287	69	18
HAUER, Bobby		7	21	24	30	30	112	35	42	32	23	29	273	45	44
ADAM, Freddy		20	18	27	29	23	117	28	25	12	22	15	219	76	29
MOORE, Harry		8	14	13	27	28	90	16	25	29	21	20	201	50	17
KREITZ SR, Don		2	8	7	11	29	57	25	26	27	29	26	190	5	31
COFFIN, Red		7	11	17	22	23	80	15	25	21	12	9	162	47	17
QUALIO, Dick		1	6	9	3	13	32	21	21	27	27	28	156	26	20
REUTIMANN, Buzzie		11	22	18	26	18	95	20	13	7	5	7	147	58	9
BOTZ, Johnny		17	11	18	26	16	88	14	16	10	5	10	143	37	12
TASNADY, Al		52	26	14	9	11	112	6	6	1	5	6	136	59	17
POTTS, Lauden		5	4	12	18	17	56	20	11	15	14	11	127	62	18
BRAXTON, Bobby		1	2	9	12	19	43	12	11	10	31	12	119	29	12
KELLY, Dave		13	10	16	10	21	70	11	13	10	6	7	117	47	10
OLSEN, Budd		9	16	14	17	14	70	10	9	7	5	2	103	26	12
EVANS, Jackie		20	14	19	11	17	81	5	1	6	2	2	97	16	17
DEAN, Dizzy		1	4	7	7	5	24	15	15	20	10	13	97	19	13
KOZAK, Johnny		6	1	7	5	16	35	9	9	14	14	13	94	13	11
HAMILTON, Jackie			1	5	5	6	17	7	17	17	23	13	94	3	10
BLATT, Bobby		14	11	9	10	6	50	11	7	6	9	10	93	24	18
BAKER, Jim		2	7	10	11	6	36	4	15	13	12	8	88	24	13
KIRK, Jimmy		6	6	14	8	8	42	17	7	10	7	4	87	30	6
WILLIAMS, Bill		3	9	10	10	13	45	11	8	9	5	7	85	12	5
BROWNING, Hal		4	5	13	7	10	39	4	9	12	8	12	84	27	17
KERSCHNER, Shorty		2	2	7	6	12	29	9	14	15	5	8	80	24	7
ELLIS, Billy		1	1	1	7	11	21	11	9	11	13	15	80	32	14
McANDREW, Tommy		3	6	13	9	9	40	11	12	5	2	6	76	14	10
CARTER, Rags		6	12	4	5	6	33	5	5	7	14	8	72	17	5
DELP, Russ		2	4	3	9	8	26	11	7	7	10	5	66	29	4
FITZCHARLES, Glenn		4	4	7	7	4	26	7	7	6	7	8	61	20	8
OLSEN, Walt		2	5	1	9	6	23	10	5	13	3	7	61	17	8
LONG, Tommy		1	8	10	5	4	28	6	7	5	8	3	57	6	10
MULLIGAN, Whip		3	5	10	8	4	30	5	5	6	7		53	8	5
MARBURGER, Dave		1	3	1	6	2	13	5	8	9	10	8	53	34	7
HORTON JR, Jimmy		14	9	11	8	1	43	4	1	1	1	2	52	19	4
DUNSTAN, Ronnie			2	3	2	9	16	7	7	3	7	8	48	16	15
VAN HORN, Carl		6	10	4	3	4	27	3	4	2	4	7	47	27	9
MALZAHN, Bobby		4	4	4	5	5	22	5	5	5	5	4	46	9	1
TOBIAS, Ronnie		1	2	1	7	6	17	5	3	5	4	11	45	9	4
BOTTCHER, Bobby			1	1		4	6	6	6	7	7	13	45	9	5
DERR, Earl				1	2	1	4	1	9	7	8	15	44	16	6
SCHNEIDER, Frankie		11	10	2	3	2	28	2	4	2	2	2	40	10	6
COZZE, Frank		2	4	2	8	5	21	3	4	5	3	4	40	17	1
DeSANTIS, Meme		7	10	7	4	4	32	3	3	1			39	4	5
PLOSKI JR, Stan		6	9	4	4	3	26	3	2	3	2	2	38	11	8
SEIDEL, Bob		1	1	1	1	3	7	3	9	7	2	10	38	13	1
WELD, Kenny		15	8	5	2		30	1	2		2	2	37	32	2
VARNER, Donnie		2	1	6	5	1	15	6	5	7	3	1	37	11	4
VOSS, Larry		3	3	7	4	3	20		3	5	4	4	36	14	2
McLAUGHLIN, Jackie		9	6	3	6	3	27	3		4			34	11	1
MANCHESTER, Leon		1	1		4	5	11	1	4	4	6	6	32	3	5
TOBIAS, Ron		1	1	3	3	1	9	3	3	6	8	3	32	9	6
TROUT. Kim				1	3	3	7	3	3	7	3	9	32	12	2
BEAVERS, Sammy				3	4	5	12	4	3	2	5	4	30	3	2
BRIGHTBILL, Freddy		1		1	2	2	6	5	3	1	9	4	28	6	5
GOLLUB, Gary		4	2	5	4	3	18	4	2	1		2	27	18	3
PANTUSO, Vince						1	1	2	5	3	4	12	27	6	2
SMITH, Russ				1	2		3	3	5	4	7	4	26	6	3
FELTY, Elvin			6	5	1	1	13	3	1	2	3	3	25	5	6
STEIF, Billy				2	3	3	8	2	2	4	4	5	25	9	6
KERSCHNER, Whitey		1	1	3	1	1	7	4	2	2	6	4	25	11	3
REIFINGER, Hal				1	3	3	7	5	5	1	2	5	25	5	4
KENNEDY, Beader			2	3	1		6	3	3	7	5	1	25	12	2
YOUNG, Bruce						2	2	2	2	7	5	7	25	14	3
KELLY, Joe			3	2		1	6	1	8	1	5	3	24	3	2
DESKOVICH, Billy		3	1	6	3	2	15		3	3	2		23	7	5
ROSSELL, Bob			3	1	4	5	13	2	1	4	3		23	3	2
PICKELL, Bobby		1	2	2	2	1	8	2		7	5	1	23	5	5
SMITH, Ralph		1	1	2	1	5	10	4		2	3	2	21	1	5
BALOGACH, Paul					1		1	1	5	4	4	6	21	3	1
GARBER, Harry			1				1	2	3	2	7	5	20	7	3
GREEN, Butch			1	1	2	3	7	4	2	1	3	1	18	13	2
MILLER, Paul				1		3	4	2	1	7	1	3	18	4	2
MEALS, Mike		2	4	3	1	3	13	1	1		2		17	6	2
STONG, Jay		2	1	2			5	1	1	5	3	2	17	8	9
CAGLE, Will		1	5			3	9	3	2		2		16	8	3
SCHOFFSTALL, Dave				1	2	2	5	4	2	1	1	3	16	1	1
COLLINS, Kevin			3		2	5	10	1	2	1		1	15	13	1
KREITZ JR, Don				4	2	4	10		1	1		3	15	3	1
CONRAD, Vince		1	2	1		3	7		2	3	1	2	15	2	2
MOORE, Mose						3	3	2	2	1	4	3	15	4	2
REUTIMANN, Wayne			1				1	8	2	3		1	15	3	
ALLEN, Bobby			3	1	4	2	10	1		1		2	14	3	2
BALOUGH, Gary			2	1	1	3	7	3	3		1		14	6	2
MIKOSZ, Junior		1		2	1	2	6	1	1	1	2	3	14	1	4
BROWN, Ralph			1		2		3		4	2	2	3	14	2	1
CAPIE, Tom					2	1	3	3	3	2	2	1	14	2	2
PRATT, Eddie		1	2		1		4	2	2	2		3	13	7	1
RILEY, Don				1		3	4			1	4	4	13	7	2
OSMUN, Dave			1	1	1		3	2	1		2	5	13	3	2
FITZCHARLES, Paul						2	2	3	1		3	4	13	8	1
OSMUN, Billy		3				2	5		1	3	2	1	12	6	1
HAVENS, Dick					2	2	4	1	2	3	1	1	12		2
DETWEILER, Ralph							0	1	2	3	2	4	12	3	
SHEETZ, Tommy				2	2		4	2	2			2	10	3	1
TILLMAN, Herbie			1			1	2	3	2	1	1	1	10	1	1
HALDEMAN, Ed							0	1	2		4	3	10	1	2
BURKHART, Barry					2	1	3	1		2	1	2	9	7	
SLEIGHT, George			1			1	2		1	4	1	1	9	1	2
EPPIHIMER, Bob					1	1	2	1		1	2	3	9	2	
COVILLE, C D			2	2		2	6	2					8	2	
PAUCH, Billy			2	2	1		5	1	1		1		8	3	3
HAGER, Tom		2			2		4	2			1	1	8	5	2
VON DOHREN, Barry			1		1	1	3		1		2	2	8	4	
LINGLE, Joe				1	1	1	3	1	1	2		1	8	2	5
DeGROOT, Fred				1		1	2	2	2		1	1	8		1
HARWI, Otto						1	1			3	1	2	7	2	
COX, Dan							0	3	1	1		2	7	1	1
SHAW, Bob							0	1	4		2		7	4	2
SASSAMAN, Dave							0	1	1	1	1	3	7		
RAFTER, Bill				3	1		4		1	1			6	1	
COLLIS, Carl			1		1		2		1	1		2	6	6	
RICHARDS, Harvey					1	1	2	1		3			6	1	
SWEIGART, Bob					1		1		1		1	3	6	3	1
HILDRETH, Elton						1	1		1	2	1	1	6		
SLADE, Ron						1	1		1		2	2	6		
DECKER, Charlie							0	2		2		2	6		
LESHER, Red							0		3		3		6	2	2
MOYER, Gene							0		1	2	1	2	6		
CAMERON, Alex							0		1	1	2	2	6	8	1
SWINEHART, Ray			1	1		2	4					1	5	5	1
KELLY, Mike					1	1	2	1	1	1			5		
DICKSON, Larry					1	1	2	1		1		1	5		2
SKIAS, Chris						2	2	1	1			1	5	4	
ERB, Mike					1		1	1	1	1		1	5		
TAYLOR, Lee					1		1			1	1	2	5		1
BUTLER, Gary						1	1		1		2	1	5	2	1
GEORGE, Del							0	1	1		1	2	5		
SCHELL, Tim							0	1		1	2	1	5		
PAXTON, Lynn							0		2	2		1	5		1
TILLEY, Ray			2	1			3					1	4	3	
CRONCE, Howie				1	1	1	3					1	4		1
SAUDER, Kenny				1	1		2	1			1		4	10	
WISMER SR, Kenny					1		1	1	1		1		4	2	1
WOLFORD, Gary					1		1	1	1			1	4	2	
SEROKA, Lenny					1		1		2		1		4		
PAULSON, Ronnie					1		1		1	1		1	4	4	
KOCH, Paul					1		1		1		1	1	4	1	2
WARREN, Smokey					1		1			2	1		4	1	
BRACKEY, Bruno					1		1			1	1	1	4	1	
WEAVER, Mark						1	1			1	2		4	2	
FORRETTE, Maynard						1	1				1	2	4		
GEMENDEN, Phil						1	1					3	4	1	2
GRBAC, Mike							0			2		2	4		3
GILMORE, Charlie							0			1	2	1	4		1
OCHS, Larry							0			1	1	2	4	3	
FRENCH, Ralph							0				2	2	4	2	2
SNELLBAKER, Smokey							0				2	2	4		2
KANTORSKY, Pete							0				2	2	4		1
ROHS, Steve				1		1	2				1		3		1
BLACKLEY, Johnny					1	1	2		1				3	1	
DENGLER, Smokey						2	2				1		3	3	1
BREEDING, Walt			1				1	1			1		3		
REICHERT, Joe				1			1				2		3	2	1
STUMPF, Don					1		1	1			1		3		2
HULBERT, Mert					1		1			1	1		3	1	1
GRIFFIN, Pee Wee						1	1		2				3	1	3
WIMBLE, Bill						1	1				1	1	3		1
NOTHSTEIN, Junior						1	1					2	3	1	1
EARNSHAW, Leigh							0	1	1			1	3	1	
VOLZ, Tony							0	1		1	1		3	1	
HUBBARD, Johnny							0	1		1		1	3	5	
LODER, Don							0		1			2	3	1	2
SOLOMON, Larry							0			1	1	1	3		
JOHNSON, Alan			2				2						2	2	1
SCOTT, Tighe			1				1					1	2		1
OSBORNE, Lee				1			1			1			2		1
STIVES, Don				1			1					1	2	1	1
FELTY, LeRoy						1	1	1					2	1	1
KNEISEL, Dave						1	1		1				2		
HIEBER, Gary						1	1		1				2		
OPPERMAN, Jan						1	1				1		2	1	
SPENCER, Ed						1	1				1		2		1
SADLER, Blaine						1	1					1	2	4	1
LYNCH, Ed						1	1					1	2		
WILLIAMSON, Kramer							0	2					2		
BLUM, Bill							0	1	1				2		
HENDRICKSON, Lee							0	1			1		2		
BUNTING, Harold							0		1			1	2	1	
KATONA, Les							0		1			1	2		
HOLLAND, Eddie							0			1	1		2	1	
STECKER, Russ							0			1	1		2		2
FARLEY, Ed							0			1	1		2		
VAN KIRK, Billy							0			1	1		2		
BITTING, Del							0			1		1	2	3	1
ABEL, Bobby							0			1		1	2		1
GUEST, Terry							0			1		1	2		
ZIMMERMAN, Dick							0			1		1	2		
BROMMER, Aaron							0			1		1	2		
DALLENBACH, Wally							0			1		1	2		
STRUPP, Sonny							0			1		1	2		
WINKS, Jimmy							0				1	1	2		
HEIN, Jim							0				1	1	2		
REAKES, Sammy							0				1	1	2		
JOHNSON, Bob							0					2	2	3	2
MATTA, Tony							0					2	2	3	1
ELY, George							0					2	2		
DIFFENDORF, Don			1				1						1		
REIDER, Blackie						1	1						1	1	1
RUDY, Jack						1	1						1		
MAYBERRY, Tom							0	1					1		
GILLETTE, Don							0	1					1		
JOHNSON, Jack							0		1				1		
LAPE, Dave							0		1				1		
KESSLER, Randy							0		1				1		
YETTER, Richie							0		1				1		
REINERT, Noot							0		1				1		
WELLER, Curt							0			1			1	2	
DONAHUE, Joe							0			1			1	2	
LAZZARO, Lou							0			1			1	2	
EMERICH, Bob							0			1			1	1	
DISSINGER, Butch							0			1			1		1
McCAUGHEY, Craig							0			1			1		1
BAILEY, Charlie							0			1			1		
BRENN JR, Ken							0			1			1		
CARROLL, Jackie							0			1			1		
GRIFFIN, Bernie							0			1			1		
KEMMERER, Jim							0			1			1		
HARRISON, George							0				1		1	1	
ROMER JR, Joe							0				1		1		1
TRAUTMAN, Bob							0				1		1		1
BUSS, Del							0				1		1		
CHARLES, Harry							0				1		1		
EPPOLITE, Frank							0				1		1		
FREYER, Karl							0				1		1		
HERN, Tom							0				1		1		
MEAHL, Ken							0				1		1		
SHIRK, Darryl							0				1		1		
ROCHELLE, Paul							0				1		1		
ALLEN, Jerre							0					1	1	2	
TROUT, Bob							0					1	1	1	1
WALES, Milford							0					1	1	1	
HALL, Bob							0					1	1		
TAYLOR, Larry							0					1	1		
BEHRENT, Harry							0					1	1		
CLEAVER, Dennis							0					1	1		
EPRIGHT, Fritz							0					1	1		
GUINTHER, Ronnie							0					1	1		
LAWSHE, Art							0					1	1		
MURPHY, Johnny							0					1	1		
RADFORD, Paul							0					1	1		
READINGER, Dan							0					1	1		
SHARP, Henry							0					1	1		
SHIRE, Charlie							0					1	1		
WISMER JR, Kenny							0					1	1		
COREY, Pete							0					1	1		
GAHAN, Ernie							0					1	1		
STANTON, Dave							0					1	1		
							TOP						TOP		
drivers		1	2	3	4	5	FIVES	6	7	8	9	10	TENS	HTS	CONSI
SUMMARY		716	714	715	715	715	3575	715	715	715	715	715	7150	2009	839
		1 TIE (1st) - Freddy Adam & Jackie Evans - 8/13/1967													
