= 1975 Music City USA 420 =

Auto race held at Nashville Speedway in 1975

Race details
- Race 11 of 30 in the 1975 NASCAR Winston Cup Series season
- Date: May 10, 1975
- Official name: Music City USA 420
- Location: Nashville Speedway, Nashville, Tennessee
- Course: Permanent racing facility
- Course length: 0.959 km (0.596 miles)
- Distance: 420 laps, 250.3 mi (402.8 km)
- Weather: Temperatures ranging between 55 °F (13 °C) and 80.1 °F (26.7 °C); wind speeds of 11.1 miles per hour (17.9 km/h)
- Average speed: 94.107 miles per hour (151.451 km/h)

Pole position
| Driver | Darrell Waltrip | DarWal Inc. |

Most laps led
| Driver | Cale Yarborough | Junior Johnson & Associates |
- Laps: 273

Winner
| No. 17 | Darrell Waltrip | DarWal Inc. |

Television in the United States
- Network: untelevised
- Announcers: none

The 1975 Music City USA 420 was a NASCAR Winston Cup Series race that took place on May 10, 1975, at Nashville Speedway in Nashville, Tennessee. Darrell Waltrip won his first NASCAR Cup Series race

== Background ==
Nashville Speedway was converted to a half-mile paved oval in 1957, when it began to be a NASCAR series track. The speedway was lengthened between the 1969 and 1970 seasons. The corners were cut down from 35 degrees to their present 18 degrees in 1972.

== Race report ==
There were 28 American-born drivers on the grid; Buddy Arrington received credit for the last-place finish after his car overheated on the second lap. There were 420 laps in this race. They were completed in more than two and a half hours with Darrell Waltrip defeating Benny Parsons by at least two laps in front of an audience of 20000. It was the first of 84 career Cup Series wins in what would become a Hall of Fame career.

Waltrip earned the pole position in qualifying for his fast qualifying run of 103.793 miles per hour (167.039 km/h); driving a 1975 Chevrolet Chevelle Laguna. Only one caution flag waved for a period of eight laps; two changes in first-place were made between Cale Yarborough and Darrell Waltrip.

Notable crew chiefs who were Tim Brewer, Travis Carter, Harry Hyde, Dale Inman, and Jake Elder.

Richard Petty would retain his championship points lead over Dave Marcis by 225 points. He had won five races and earned two pole positions prior to qualifying this event.

Frank Warren was the lowest finishing driver to actually finish the race; being 47 laps behind Waltrip. Attrition took its toll as only twelve cars were running at the end. Other notable drivers who raced included J.D. McDuffie, Richard Childress, Elmo Langley and Coo Coo Marlin. Monetary awards ranged from $6,500 for Waltrip ($37,982.99 when adjusted for inflation) to $305 for last-place finisher Arrington ($1,782.28 when adjusted for inflation). Engine problems and overheating issues would cause many of the qualifying drivers not to finish the race.

=== Qualifying ===
| Grid | No. | Driver | Manufacturer |
|---|---|---|---|
| 1 | 17 | Darrell Waltrip | '75 Chevrolet |
| 2 | 72 | Benny Parsons | '75 Chevrolet |
| 3 | 11 | Cale Yarborough | '75 Chevrolet |
| 4 | 43 | Richard Petty | '74 Dodge |
| 5 | 70 | J.D. McDuffie | '75 Chevrolet |
| 6 | 71 | Dave Marcis | '74 Dodge |
| 7 | 68 | Alton Jones | '74 Chevrolet |
| 8 | 30 | Walter Ballard | '75 Chevrolet |
| 9 | 96 | Richard Childress | '75 Chevrolet |
| 10 | 47 | Bruce Hill | '75 Chevrolet |
| 11 | 14 | Coo Coo Marlin | '75 Chevrolet |
| 12 | 24 | Cecil Gordon | '75 Chevrolet |
| 13 | 05 | David Sisco | '75 Chevrolet |
| 14 | 8 | Ed Negre | '74 Dodge |
| 15 | 48 | James Hylton | '74 Chevrolet |
| 16 | 10 | Bill Champion | '73 Ford |
| 17 | 6 | Jody Ridley | '74 Dodge |
| 18 | 20 | Rick Newsom | '73 Ford |
| 19 | 46 | Travis Tiller | '74 Dodge |
| 20 | 64 | Elmo Langley | '73 Ford |
| 21 | 79 | Frank Warren | '74 Dodge |
| 22 | 01 | Earle Canavan | '74 Dodge |
| 23 | 23 | Earl Brooks | '74 Dodge |
| 24 | 44 | Richard B. Brown | '74 Pontiac |
| 25 | 25 | Jabe Thomas | '74 Chevrolet |
| 26 | 39 | Paul Dean Holt | '73 Ford |
| 27 | 45 | Baxter Price | '74 Chevrolet |
| 28 | 67 | Buddy Arrington | '73 Plymouth |

== Finishing order ==
Section reference:

1. Darrell Waltrip (No. 17)
2. Benny Parsons† (No. 72)
3. Coo Coo Marlin† (No. 14)
4. Dave Marcis (No. 71)
5. Cecil Gordon† (No. 24)
6. Alton Jones (No. 68)
7. Richard Petty (No. 43)
8. David Sisco (No. 05)
9. James Hylton† (No. 48)
10. Walter Ballard (No. 30)
11. J.D. McDuffie† (No. 70)
12. Frank Warren (No. 79)
13. Rick Newsom*† (No. 20)
14. Cale Yarborough*† (No. 11)
15. Elmo Langley*† (No. 64)
16. Richard Childress* (No. 96)
17. Earle Canavan* (No. 01)
18. Bill Champion*† (No. 10)
19. Jabe Thomas* (No. 25)
20. Baxter Price* (No. 45)
21. Paul Dean Holt* (No. 39)
22. Earl Brooks*† (No. 23)
23. Bruce Hill* (No. 7)
24. Ed Negre* (No. 8)
25. Richard D. Brown* (No. 44)
26. Travis Tiller* (No. 46)
27. Jody Ridley* (No. 6)
28. Buddy Arrington* (No. 67)

† signifies that the driver is known to be deceased
* Driver failed to finish race

== Timeline ==
Section reference:

- Start: Darrell Waltrip was leading the starting grid as the green flag was waved.
- Lap 2: Buddy Arrington managed to overheat his vehicle.
- Lap 11: The suspension on Jody Ridley's vehicle developed severe problems.
- Lap 13: Travis Tiller blew his engine while driving at high speeds.
- Lap 15: Richard D. Brown managed to overheat his vehicle.
- Lap 16: Ed Negre blew his engine while driving at high speeds.
- Lap 19: Bruce Hill blew his engine while driving at high speeds.
- Lap 33: Earl Brooks managed to overheat his vehicle.
- Lap 34: Transmission problems got the best of Paul Dean Holt's vehicle.
- Lap 38: Baxter Prices noticed that his vehicle was leaking oil.
- Lap 48: Cale Yarborough took over the lead from Darrell Waltrip.
- Lap 54: Jabe Thomas blew his engine while driving at high speeds.
- Lap 91: The rear end came off of Bill Champion's vehicle in an unsafe manner.
- Lap 165: Earle Canavan blew his engine while driving at high speeds.
- Lap 192: Richard Childress blew his engine while driving at high speeds.
- Lap 321: Darrell Waltrip took over the lead from Cale Yarborough.
- Lap 322: Cale Yarborough and Elmo Langley blew their engines while driving at high speeds.
- Lap 351: Rick Newsom blew his engine while driving at high speeds.
- Finish: Darrell Waltrip was officially declared the winner of the race.

== Standings after the race ==
| Pos | Driver | Points | Differential |
|---|---|---|---|
| 1 | Richard Petty | 1744 | 0 |
| 2 | Dave Marcis | 1519 | -225 |
| 3 ▲ | Benny Parsons | 1466 | -278 |
| 4 ▲ | Darrell Waltrip | 1459 | -285 |
| 5 ▼ | James Hylton | 1439 | -305 |
| 6 | Cecil Gordon | 1431 | -313 |
| 7 | Richard Childress | 1379 | -365 |
| 8 | Dick Brooks | 1225 | -519 |
| 9 ▲ | Elmo Langley | 1215 | -529 |
| 10 ▲ | Walter Ballard | 1198 | -546 |

| Preceded by 1975 Winston 500 | NASCAR Winston Cup Season; 1975 | Succeeded by 1975 Mason-Dixon 500 |

| Preceded by 1974 | Music City USA 420 races 1975 | Succeeded by 1976 |
