= Lee Petty =

American racing driver (1914–2000)

- Petty in 1959
- Born: Lee Arnold Petty; March 14, 1914; Randleman, North Carolina, U.S.
- Died: April 5, 2000 (aged 86); Greensboro, North Carolina, U.S.
- Achievements: 1954, 1958, 1959 Grand National Champion; 1959 Daytona 500 Winner (inaugural race)
- Awards: 1952–1954 Grand National Series Most Popular Driver; International Motorsports Hall of Fame (1990); Motorsports Hall of Fame of America (1996); North Carolina Sports Hall of Fame; NASCAR Hall of Fame (2011); Named one of NASCAR's 75 Greatest Drivers (2023)

NASCAR Cup Series career
- 427 races run over 15 years
- Best finish: 1st (1954, 1958, 1959)
- First race: 1949 Race No. 1 (Charlotte)
- Last race: 1964 The Glen 151.8 (Watkins Glen)
- First win: 1949 untitled race (Pittsburgh)
- Last win: 1961 untitled race (Jacksonville)
Wins	Top tens	Poles
54	332	18

NASCAR Convertible Division career
- 28 races run over 2 years
- Best finish: 13th (1957)
- First race: 1957 Race #2 (Daytona Beach & Road Course)
- Last race: 1959 Race #14 (Greenville-Pickens)
- First win: 1958 Race #10 (Charlotte Fairgrounds)
- Last win: 1959 Race #14 (Greenville-Pickens)
Wins	Top tens	Poles
2	21	1
- Statistics up to date as of February 1, 2018.

Lee Arnold Petty (March 14, 1914 – April 5, 2000) was an American stock car racing driver who competed during the 1950s and 1960s. He is the patriarch of the Petty racing family. He was one of the early pioneers of NASCAR and one of its first stars. He was NASCAR's first three-time Cup champion. He is the father of Richard Petty, who went on to become one of the most successful stock car racing drivers in history. He is also the grandfather of Kyle Petty and great grandfather of Adam Petty.

== Career ==
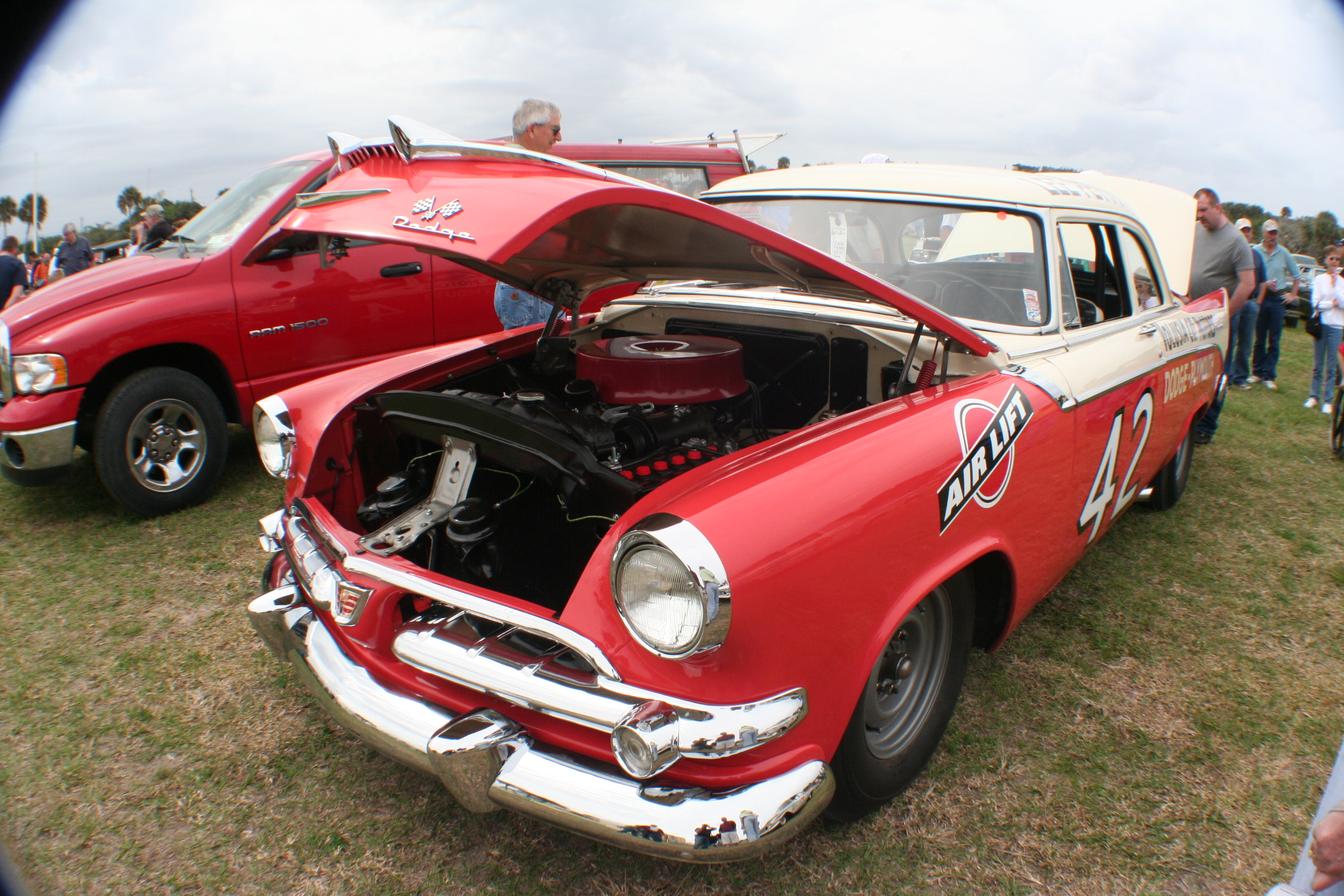
Lee Petty's No. 42 1956 Dodge Coronet

Petty was born near Randleman, North Carolina, the son of Jessie Maude (née Bell) and Judson Ellsworth Petty. He was 35 when he began his racing career. He participated in NASCAR's inaugural race, held at the three-quarter mile long dirt track, Charlotte Speedway; he raced in a 1948 Buick Roadmaster he borrowed from his neighbor under the assurance that the prize money earned from the race could pay off any damages to the car. With son Richard watching, Petty lost control of the car and rolled it in turn three. Basing on his earlier experience as an occasional moonshine runner, Petty would take factory cars to a local service station, pull the mufflers off the car and go racing.

Petty finished in the top-five in season points for NASCAR's first eleven seasons and won the NASCAR Grand National Series driver's championship three times. Petty was also the winner of the inaugural Daytona 500 in 1959.

=== 1959 Daytona 500 ===
In the inaugural race at Daytona International Speedway, Petty battled with Johnny Beauchamp during the final laps of the race. Petty, Beauchamp, and Joe Weatherly drove side by side by side across the finish line at the final lap for a photo finish. Petty drove a 1959 Oldsmobile Super 88 (No. 42), while Beauchamp drove a 1959 Ford Thunderbird (No. 73) and Weatherly did so in a 1959 Chevrolet (No. 48), all coupés. Beauchamp was unofficially declared the winner, and he drove to victory lane. Petty protested the results, saying "I had Beauchamp by a good two feet. In my own mind, I know I won." It took NASCAR founder Bill France Sr. three days to decide the winner. In the end, with the help of the national newsreel, Petty was officially declared the winner. His son Richard drove a 1957 Oldsmobile convertible (No. 43) and finished 57th out of the 59 starters after blowing an engine after eight laps.

In a 1999 interview over the controversial finish, Petty expressed his belief that France Sr. knew Petty won, but purposely called Beauchamp the winner to intentionally cause controversy. Petty stated, "France would have done anything to generate publicity for his racetracks."

=== 1959 Lakewood 500 ===
During a stock car race at Lakewood in Atlanta, Georgia, Richard raced against Lee, a teammate to his father on the Petty Enterprises racing team. After a side-by-side duel with his father, Richard passed Lee with less than ten laps to go and went on to win the race. It was one of Richard's first races and he became a first-time Cup series winner during his rookie year. Hours after the race was over, officials changed the official results after a protest was filed by Lee. Lee protested that Richard was one lap down and was credited with an extra lap. Richard was demoted to third and Lee was declared the race winner. In the days that followed, Lee was quoted as saying in a newspaper, "I would have protested my mother if I needed to."

== Crash and retirement ==
During the second race of the Twin Qualifying Events of the 1961 Daytona 500, Johnny Beauchamp lost control and caught Petty's bumper, sending both cars through the guardrail and out of the track. Petty's car struck spectator A. B. Kelley who suffered multiple cuts but still helped evacuate Petty from the twisted metal. Petty and Beauchamp were no strangers to each other as they were previously involved in the first Daytona 500 finish which took place two years earlier. Petty suffered numerous life-threatening injuries, including multiple fractures, internal injuries, and a punctured lung that forced him to stay in the Daytona Hospital for four months. The crash ultimately led to the end of Petty's regular driving career, though he sporadically competed in later events; his final race took place in 1964 at the Glen.

== Petty Enterprises ==
Petty was the father of Richard Petty, who became NASCAR's record holder for race wins. With sons Richard and Maurice Petty, he founded Petty Enterprises, which became NASCAR's most successful racing team. He was the grandfather of Kyle Petty, and the great-grandfather of Adam Petty, who died in a crash during a Busch Series practice session at New Hampshire International Speedway. He is also the grandfather of Ritchie Petty, who ran a few races in NASCAR. His nephew Dale Inman worked for Petty Enterprises as Richard's crew chief from the early 1960s until 1981 and during the 1990s.

== Awards ==
- In 1990, Petty was inducted into the International Motorsports Hall of Fame.
- Petty was inducted in the Motorsports Hall of Fame of America in 1996.
- Petty was elected to the North Carolina Sports Hall of Fame.
- Petty was selected as one of NASCAR's 50 Greatest Drivers in 1998 along with his son, Richard Petty.
- Petty was inducted into the NASCAR Hall of Fame on May 23, 2011.

== Death ==
In February 2000, Petty falls ill as he began experiencing severe medical issues and wass hospitalized at Moses H. Cone Memorial Hospital in Greensboro, North Carolina because he had a stomach anyrusm, On February 9, 2000, it was reported Petty underwent surgery for an abdominal aortic aneurysm which is a tear in the aorta vessel near the stomach that grows until cardiac arrest. Despite the surgery, his condition deteriorated because the aorta vessel near his stomach begins to suffer from an abdominal aortic dissection (tearing) as he was described as being in failing health as he remained in hospital inculding on his 86th birthday and on April 5, 2000, he died of abdominal aortic dissection. He was buried at the Level Cross United Methodist Church Cemetery in Randleman, North Carolina. Lee died just three days after his great-grandson Adam made his Winston Cup Series debut at Texas Motor Speedway, Adam would be killed at the age of 19 just 5 weeks later from a practice crash at New Hampshire Motor Speedway.

== Motorsports career results ==
=== NASCAR ===
(key) (Bold – Pole position awarded by qualifying time. Italics – Pole position earned by points standings or practice time. * – Most laps led.)

==== Grand National Series ====
NASCAR Grand National Series results
Year	Team	No.	Make	1	2	3	4	5	6	7	8	9	10	11	12	13	14	15	16	17	18	19	20	21	22	23	24	25	26	27	28	29	30	31	32	33	34	35	36	37	38	39	40	41	42	43	44	45	46	47	48	49	50	51	52	53	54	55	56	57	58	59	60	61	62	NGNC	Pts
1949	Gilmer Goode	38	Buick	CLT; 17	DAB																																																													2nd	725
1949	Petty Enterprises	42	Plymouth			HBO; 9	LAN; 7	HAM	MAR; 2	HEI; 1	NWS; 2																																																							2nd	725
1950	Petty Enterprises	42	Plymouth	DAB; 16	CLT; 18	LAN; 5	MAR; 3	CAN; 4	VER; 5	DSP; 8	MCF; 3	CLT; 11	HBO; 7	DSP; 4	HAM; 27	DAR; 6	LAN; 4	NWS	VER; 7	MAR; 2	WIN	HBO; 1																																												3rd	1590
1951	Petty Enterprises	42	Plymouth	DAB; 31	CLT; 2	NMO; 7	GAR	HBO; 9	ASF; 26	NWS; 3	MAR; 6	CAN; 5	CLS; 5	CLB; 20	DSP; 12	GAR	GRS; 6	BAI; 6	HEI; 21	AWS; 25	MCF; 1	ALS; 3	MSF; 13	FMS; 29	MOR; 2	ABS; 7	DAR; 15	CLB; 18	CCS; 21	LAN; 9	CLT	DSP; 4	WIL	HBO; 5	TPN	PGS	MAR; 2	OAK	NWS; 2	HMS	JSP; 7	ATL; 12	GAR	NMO; 16																						4th	2392.25
1952	Petty Enterprises	42	Plymouth	PBS; 2		JSP; 22	NWS; 9	MAR; 4	CLB; 2	ATL; 3	CCS; 7	LAN; 3	DAR; 7	DSP; 4	CAN; 23	HAY	FMS; 3	HBO; 6	CLT; 4		NIF; 16	OSW; 5	MON; 3	MOR; 1*		MCF; 4	AWS	DAR; 6	CCS; 1	LAN; 1	DSP; 2	WIL; 2	HBO; 5	MAR; 3	NWS; 13	ATL; 2	PBS; 4																													3rd	6498.5
1952	Petty Enterprises	42	Lincoln		DAB; 9																																																													3rd	6498.5
1952	Petty Enterprises	42	Chrysler																	MSF; 32					PPS; 2																																									3rd	6498.5
1953	Petty Enterprises	42	Dodge	PBS; 1*	DAB	HAR; 3	NWS; 4	CLT; 11	RCH; 1	CCS; 19	LAN; 2	CLB; 5	HCY; 15	MAR; 1	PMS; 8	RSP; 8	LOU; 1	FIF; 3	LAN; 2	TCS; 5	WIL; 9	MCF; 3	PIF; 1	MOR; 3	ATL; 3	RVS; 4	LCF; 3	DAV; 3	HBO; 3	AWS; 7	PAS; 3	HCY; 4	DAR; 11	CCS; 2	LAN; 6	BLF; 6	WIL; 4	NWS; 5	MAR; 2	ATL; 3																										2nd	7814
1954	Petty Enterprises	42	Dodge	PBS; 3		JSP; 3	ATL; 6	OSP	OAK; 6	NWS; 5	HBO; 6	CCS; 9		WIL; 4			RSP; 4				LND; 10			WGS; 7																																										1st	8649
1954	Petty Enterprises	42	Chrysler		**DAB**; 1*								**LAN**; 9*		MAR; 2	SHA; 1*		CLT; 2	GAR	CLB; 5		HCY; 2	MCF; 1		PIF; 3		SFS; 4	GRS; 1	MOR; 6	OAK	CLT; 1	SAN; 5	COR; 1	DAR; 38	CCS; 3	CLT; 2	LAN; 2	MAS; 3	**MAR**; 1*	NWS; 32																										1st	8649
1954	Gary Drake	100	Olds																							AWS; 4																																								1st	8649
1955	Petty Enterprises	42	Chrysler	TCS; 1*	PBS; 5	JSP; 1*	DAB; 2	OSP; 1*	CLB; 6		NWS; 4	MGY; 6	LAN; 7	CLT; 15	HCY; 4	ASF	TUS	MAR; 2	RCH; 3	NCF; 4	FOR; 1	LIN; 14	MCF; 20	FON; 3	**AIR**; 1*	CLT; 9	PIF; 3	CLB; 13	AWS; 18	MOR; 2	ALS; 3	NYF; 3		CLT; 10																																3rd	7194
1955	Petty Enterprises	42	Dodge							HBO; 6																							SAN; 5		FOR; 1*	MAS; 19	RSP; 22	DAR; 21	MGY; 4		RSP; 9	GPS; 10	MAS; 11	CLB; 19	MAR; 8	LVP	NWS; 2	HBO; 23																		3rd	7194
1955	Carl Krueger	303	Chrysler																																					LAN; 28																										3rd	7194
1956	Petty Enterprises	42	Dodge	HCY; 3	CLT; 3	WSS	PBS; 5	ASF; 5	DAB; 12	PBS; 12	WIL; 13	ATL; 5	NWS; 8	LAN; 4	RCH; 7	CLB; 19	CON; 23	GPS; 20	HCY; 15	HBO; 3	MAR; 3	LIN; 3	CLT; 5	POR	EUR	NYF; 4	MER	MAS; 6	CLT; 3	MCF; 21	POR	AWS; 1	**RSP**; 36	PIF; 1	CSF	CHI; 10	CCF; 9	MGY; 5	OKL; 5*	ROA; 13	OBS; 22	SAN	NOR; 7	PIF; 14	MYB; 15	POR	DAR; Wth	CSH; 12	CLT; 10	LAN; 2	POR	CLB; 7	HBO; 12	NWP; 9	CLT; 8	CCF; 21	MAR; 21	HCY; 11	WIL; 9							4th	8324
1956	Fred Frazier	35	Ford																																												DAR; 17																			4th	8324
1957	Petty Enterprises	42	Dodge	WSS	CON; 5	TIC; 11																																																												4th	8528
1957	Petty Enterprises	42M	Olds				DAB; 27	CON																																																										4th	8528
1957	Petty Enterprises	42	Olds						WIL; 4	HBO; 5	AWS; 10	NWS; 7	LAN; 9	CLT; 4	PIF; 4	GBF; 6	POR	CCF; 8	RCH	MAR; 5	POR	EUR	LIN; 10	LCS; 3	ASP	NWP; 10	CLB; 13	CPS	**PIF**; 1	**JAC**; 8	RSP; 15	CLT; 3	MAS; 6	POR	HCY; 2	NOR; 8	LCS; 5	GLN; 8	KPC	LIN; 25	OBS; 1	MYB; 6	DAR; 24	NYF; 2	AWS; 1	CSF	SCF	LAN; 14	CLB; 8	CCF; 5	**CLT**; 1	MAR; 3	NBR; 23	CON; 2	NWS; 2	GBF; 5*										4th	8528
1958	Petty Enterprises	42	Olds	FAY; 2	DAB; 6	CON; 1	**FAY**; 9	WIL; 1	HBO; 4	**FAY**; 25	CLB; 4	PIF; 12	ATL; 25	CLT; 4	MAR; 11	ODS; 4	OBS; 8	GPS; 6	GBF; 2	STR; 7	NWS; 11	BGS; 23	TRN; 3	RSD; 4	CLB; 9	NBS; 2	REF; 4	LIN; 1	HCY; 1	AWS; 6	RSP; 6	MCC; 4	**SLS**; 8*	TOR; 1	BUF; 6	MCF; 4	BEL; 4	BRR; 6	CLB; 7	NSV; 5	AWS; 3	BGS; 1*	MBS; 5	DAR; 19	**CLT**; 10	BIR; 3	CSF	GAF; 2	RCH; 2	HBO; 5	SAS; 1	MAR; 7	NWS; 9													1st	12232
1958	Petty Enterprises	2	Olds																																																			ATL; 3												1st	12232
1959	Petty Enterprises	42	Olds	FAY; 9	DAY; 8	DAY; 1	HBO; 4	CON; 3	ATL; 17	WIL; 4		CLB; 3		REF; 6*	HCY; 3	MAR; 1*		CLT; 1				GPS; 3			WIL; 4																																									1st	11792
1959	Petty Enterprises	43	Olds								BGS; 2		NWS; 1																																																					1st	11792
1959	Petty Enterprises	42	Plymouth														TRN; 3		NSV; 6	ASP	PIF; 12		ATL; 1	CLB; 1		RCH; 18	**BGS**; 10	AWS; 2	DAY; 33	HEI; 3	CLT; 10	MBS; 6	CLT; 18	NSV; 4	AWS; 2	BGS; 3	**GPS**; 18	CLB; 1	DAR; 20	HCY; 1	RCH; 2	CSF	HBO; 1	MAR; 10	AWS; 1	NWS; 1*	CON; 2																			1st	11792
1960	Petty Enterprises	42	Plymouth	CLT; 7	CLB; 4	DAY	DAY; 7	DAY; 4	**CLT**; 20	NWS; 1	PHO	CLB; 4	MAR; 6	HCY; 11	WIL; 2	BGS; 12	GPS; 2	AWS; 1*	DAR; 4	PIF; 2	HBO; 1*	RCH; 1	HMS	CLT; 56	**BGS**; 2	DAY; 4	**HEI**; 1*	MAB; 3	MBS; 2	ATL; 8	BIR; 3	NSV; 4	AWS; 8	PIF; 2	CLB; 7		BGS; 2	DAR; 30	HCY; 8	CSF	GSP; 5	HBO; 11	MAR; 23	NWS; 20	CLT; 36	RCH	ATL; 6																			6th	14510
1960	Petty Enterprises	43	Plymouth																																	SBO; 7																														6th	14510
1961	Petty Enterprises	42	Plymouth	**CLT**; 3*	JSP; 1	DAY	DAY; 15	DAY; DNQ	PIF	AWS	HMS	ATL	GPS	HBO	BGS	MAR	NWS	CLB	HCY	RCH	MAR	DAR	CLT	CLT	RSD	ASP	CLT	PIF	BIR	GPS	BGS	NOR	HAS	STR	DAY	ATL	CLB	MBS	BRI	NSV	BGS	AWS	RCH	SBO	DAR	HCY	RCH	CSF	ATL	MAR	NWS	CLT	BRI	GPS	HBO											104th	–
1962	Petty Enterprises	41	Plymouth	CON	AWS	DAY	DAY	DAY	CON	AWS	SVH	HBO	RCH	CLB	NWS	GPS	MBS	MAR; 5	BGS	BRI	RCH	HCY	CON	DAR	PIF	CLT	ATL	BGS	AUG	RCH	SBO	DAY	CLB	ASH	GPS	AUG	SVH	MBS	BRI	CHT	NSV	HUN	AWS	STR	BGS	PIF	VAL	DAR	HCY	RCH	DTS	AUG	MAR	NWS	CLT	ATL										73rd	588
1963	Petty Enterprises	41	Plymouth	BIR	GGS	THS	RSD	DAY	DAY	DAY	PIF	AWS	HBO	ATL	HCY	BRI	AUG	RCH	GPS	SBO	BGS	MAR	NWS	CLB	THS	DAR	ODS	RCH	CLT	BIR	ATL	DAY	MBS	SVH	DTS	BGS; 4	ASH	OBS; 18	BRR; 6	BRI	GPS	NSV	CLB	AWS	PIF	BGS	ONA	DAR	HCY	RCH	MAR	DTS	NWS	THS	CLT	SBO	HBO	RSD								82nd	800
1964	Petty Enterprises	41	Plymouth	CON	AUG	JSP	SVH	RSD	DAY	DAY	DAY	RCH	BRI	GPS	BGS	ATL	AWS	HBO	PIF	CLB	NWS	MAR	SVH	DAR	LGY	HCY	SBO	CLT	GPS	ASH	ATL	CON	NSV	CHT	BIR	VAL	PIF	DAY	ODS; 17	OBS	BRR	ISP	GLN; 22	LIN	BRI	NSV	MBS	AWS	DTS	ONA	CLB	BGS	STR	DAR	HCY	RCH	ODS	HBO	MAR	SVH	NWS	CLT	HAR	AUG	JAC	109th	244

===== Daytona 500 =====
Year	Team	Manufacturer	Start	Finish
1959	Petty Enterprises	Oldsmobile	15	**1**
1960	Petty Enterprises	Plymouth	14	4
1961	Petty Enterprises	Plymouth	DNQ	

Sporting positions
Preceded by Herb Thomas; Buck Baker	NASCAR Grand National Champion; 1954; 1958, 1959	Succeeded by Tim Flock; Rex White
Achievements
Preceded by Inaugural	Daytona 500 Winner; 1959	Succeeded by Junior Johnson
