= 1956 International Stock Car Road Race =

Auto race held at Road America in 1956

Race details
- Race 37 of 56 in the 1956 NASCAR Grand National Series season
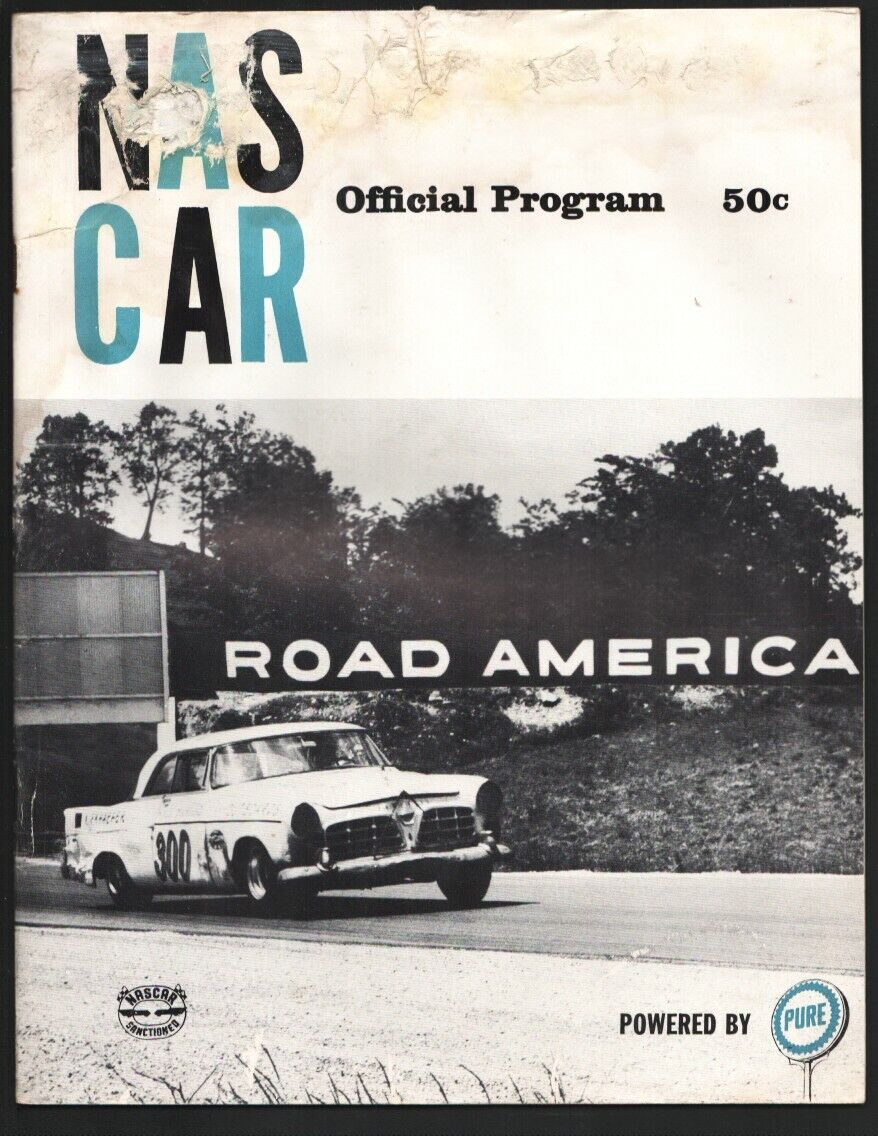
- Cover of the program for the race
- Date: August 12, 1956
- Official name: International Stock Car Road Race
- Location: Road America, near Elkhart Lake, Wisconsin
- Course: Permanent racing facility
- Course length: 4.058 miles (6.515 km)
- Distance: 63 laps, 252 mi (405.555 km)
- Average speed: 73.858 miles per hour (118.863 km/h)
- Attendance: 10,000

Pole position
Driver	Buck Baker (competed at pole) Frank Mundy (qualified pole)	Carl Kiekhaefer; Carl Kiekhaefer
- Time: 9:27.25

Most laps led
Driver	Marvin Panch	Tom Harbison
- Laps: 23

Winner
No. 15	Tim Flock	Bill Stroppe

The International Stock Car Road Race was the 37th race of the 1956 NASCAR Grand National Series. It took place at Road America near Elkhart Lake, Wisconsin on August 12, 1956. It was won by Tim Flock.

The race attracted particular interest, as road course racing was unusual for American stock car racing at the time. Ahead of the race, it was unclear how American stock cars would perform on the newly-built race track, which was regarded to be particularly challenging. The race is also considered to be the first occasion in which NASCAR ran a race during rain.

== Background ==
While the race was officially sanctioned by NASCAR, the Fédération Internationale de l'Automobile (FIA) provided support for the event and foreign cars were allowed entry. Ultimately, the race featured 25 American vehicles as well as a Jaguar Mark VII. Hubert Schroeder, secretary of the FIG's sporting arm, served as overseer of the race. The prospect of a NASCAR road race on the challenging new road course attracted particular interest, and due to this, it was attended by several racing executives: NASCAR's Bill France Sr., the United States Auto Club's Duane Carter, and the Sports Car Club of America's Jim Kimberly. At the time, all three organizations were aspiring to replace the AAA Contest Board as the new main United States race-sanctioning body, as the American Automobile Association had withdrawn from involvement in automobile racing the previous year.

Road America had opened the previous year. This was the first premier series race held at Road America. Road America was considered the nation's finest road course at the time, and was regarded as a challenging course, with tight corners and challenging grade changes. Road course racing was uncommon at the time in American stock car racing. The event was promoted as being "America's First International Stock Car Road Race". There was much advanced interest and speculation among how American cars would perform in maneuvering the challenging course. Those seeking to prognosticate how the race would go on challenged by lack of recent precedent of similar races in the United States, with Time magazine writing, "

[The race] was extraordinary because it was held on a road course, a thing so rare in recent American stock car racing that some oldtimers were casting back to the Elgin, Ill. races of more than two decades ago for a suitable precedent.

== Race overview ==
During qualifications, Frank Mundy had the fastest time, having completed three laps of the course in 9 minutes and 27.25 seconds. During the race, Buck Baker drove the car that Mundy had driven for qualifications, and therefore began the race in pole position.

NASCAR made the unusual decision to limit cars to only ten gallons of fuel at the start of the race. An estimated crowd of 10,000 spectators attended, despite poor weather.

The race is considered to be the first occasion in which NASCAR ran a race in the rain. The rainy weather before and during the race impacted it. Shortly before the planned start time for the race, the rain began with a heavy lightning storm that delayed the start by approximately 40 minutes. After this storm ended, the race began. The rain left as much as two-inches of water over portions of the track. After the race, many notable observers praised the racers' handling of their vehicles considering the slick track conditions.

During the race, drivers took frequent pit stops. Most pit stops were for gas, but there were also many tire changes. Despite pre-race questions over how the stock cars' brakes would perform on the challenging course, there were few brake problems. Several cars did, however, suffer engine problems.

Pole driver Buck Baker led the race from lap one though lap five. Tim Flock then led the race between laps 6 and 12. Marvin Panch then led the race from lap 6 through lap twelve. As the race rounded the 100 mile mark, Panch remained in the lead with Speedy Thompson, Mundy, Flock, and Baker respectively following him. In the 37th lap, Speedy Thompson overtook Panch, and Panch soon after suffered a rear-end assembly failure which forced him to withdraw from the race. Thompson then led the race beginning in the 36th lap. As the race reached its 200th mile, Thompson remained in the lead, with Flock, Billy Myers, Fireball Roberts, Paul Goldsmith, and Joe Eubanks respectively following him. After remaining in the lead through 53rd lap, Thompson suffered engine failure and retired from the race. Tim Flock then led from the 54th lap onwards, winning the race.

Flock was racing for Bill Stroppe in a 1956 Mercury. Flock averaged 71.48 miles per hour (115.04 km/h) in his 3 hours, 29 minutes, and 50 seconds of race time. The race would be the last of Flock's 39 career wins in the premier division of NASCAR (Grand National Series/NASCAR Cup Series). Flock's victory was a 17 second photo finish over fellow Stroppe racer Billy Myers. Fireball Roberts (racing for Pete DePaolo), Paul Goldsmith (racing for Smokey Yunick), and Joe Eubanks (racing for James Satcher) respectively placed third, fourth, and fifth.

Among the 26 drivers that competed at Road America were five racing for Pete DePaolo, three racing for Bill Stroppe, and three racing for Pete Kiekhaefer. The season-dominant Kiekhaefer team did not see much success in the race. Buck Baker started the race at first and Speedy Thompson started at fifth. While Baker led the first five laps, he ultimately finished eighth and suffering engine problems and dropping out in the 61st lap. While Thompson led between laps 36 and 53, he suffered engine failure in the 53rd lap and retired from the race, ultimately finishing eighteenth. The third Kiekhaefer driver, Frank Mundy, finished fourteenth. Race winner Tim Flock had started the 1956 season as a Kiekhaefer racer, but had left Keikhaefer's team due to disagreement with Keikhaefer's strict management style.

While the DePaolo team's Fireball Roberts finished third, the rest of the team fared less fortunately. DePaolo drivers Junior Johnson and Bill Amick started the race at third and fourth. However, they quickly faced trouble. Johnson placed last, dropping out of the race in the first lap due to issues with his car's clutch. Amick also suffered clutch problems and dropped out of the race in the tenth lap, placing second-to last. The DePaolo team also saw Curtis Turner crash out of the race in the 21st lap after suffering brake failure on the final corner, and ultimately placing third-to-last. DePaulo driver Ralph Moody fared the second-best among DePaolo racers, placing sixteenth, suffering rear-end damage and dropping out of the race in the 56th lap. The Stroppe team saw two of its racers, Tim Flock and Billy Myers, respectively finish first and second. Its third racer, Bobby Myers, suffered a crash and placed 21st.

While the race was considered a success, NASCAR would not again race at Road America until 2010, when the NASCAR Xfinity Series began racing there. NASCAR's premier division did not return to Road America until the 2021 season.

== General stats ==
Stats
Winning driver:	Tim Flock
Winning team:	Stroppe
Winning car make:	1956 Mercury
Track description:	4.1-mile (6.6 km) road course
Laps:	63
Length:	258.3 miles (415.7 km)
Competitors:	26 drivers
Attendance:	10,000
Duration:	3:29:50
Avg. speed:	73.858 mph (118.863 km/h)
Cautions:	0
Lead changes:	4
Margin-of-victory:	17 seconds

== Results ==
Results of race
Position	Start	Car #	Driver	Sponsor	Owner/team	Car model	Laps completed	Money won	Laps led	Notes
1	6	15	Tim Flock	Mercury	Bill Stroppe	1956 Mercury	63	$2,950	17	
2	11	14	Billy Myers		Bill Stroppe	1956 Mercury	63	$2,900	0	
3	17	22	Fireball Roberts		Pete DePaolo	1956 Ford	63	$1,275	0	
4	8	3	Paul Goldsmith		Smokey Yunick	1956 Chevrolet	63	$900	0	
5	9	56	Joe Eubanks	Satcher Motors	James Satcher	1956 Ford	63	$675	0	
6	20	92	Herb Thomas		Herb Thomas	1956 Chevrolet	62	$500	0	
7	24	75	Jim Paschal	C U Later Alligator	Frank Hayworth	1956 Mercury	62	$475	0	
8	1	502	Buck Baker		Carl Kiekhaefer	1956 Dodge	61	$475	5	Withdrew due to engine problems
9	15	21	Fred Johnson			1956 Chevrolet	60	$325	0	
10	16	131	Johnny Dodson		Johnny Dodson	1956 Chevrolet	60	$300	0	
11	25	X	Rex White		Max Welborn	1956 Chevrolet	60	$275	0	
12	19	2	Gwyn Staley		Hubert Westmoreland	1956 Chevrolet	60	$200	0	
13	10	42	Lee Petty		Petty Enterprises	1956 Dodge	59	$200	0	
14	23	300	Frank Mundy		Carl Kiekhaefer	1956 Chrysler	58	$200	0	
15	21	36	Jack Goodwin		Jack Goodwin	1956 Dodge	58	$200	0	Withdrew due to engine problems
16	7	12	Ralph Moody		Pete DePaolo	1956 Ford	56	$100	0	Withdrew due to rear end damage
17	18	264	Johnny Allen		Spook Crawford	1956 Plymouth	54	$150	0	Withdrew due to clutch issue
18	5	500	Speedy Thompson		Carl Kiekhaefer	1956 Dodge	53	$100	18	Withdrew due to engine problems
19	26	5	Ansel Rakestraw			Jaguar	48	$100	0	
20	23	9	Joe Weatherly	Schwam Motors	Charlie Schwam	1956 Ford	44	$100	0	Withdrew due to rear end damage
21	14	4	Bobby Myers	Wilson	Bill Stroppe	1956 Mercury	39	$100	0	Withdrew due to crash
22	2	98	Marvin Panch		Tom Harbison	1956 Ford	37	$150	23	withdrew due to rear end damage
23	12	7	Jim Reed		Jim Reed	1956 Chevrolet	25	$100	0	Withdrew due to fuel pump issue
24	22	26	Curtis Turner		Pete DePaolo	1956 Ford	21	$100	0	Withdrew due to crash
25	4	97	Bill Amick		Pete DePaolo	1956 Ford	10	$100	0	Withdrew due to clutch issue
26	3	296	Junior Johnson		Pete DePaolo	1956 Ford	1	$100	0	Withdrew due to clutch issue

Preceded by untitled race at Oklahoma State Fairgrounds	NASCAR Grand National Series season 1956	Succeeded by untitled race at Old Bridge Stadium

Preceded by Inaugural race	International Stock Car Road Race (NASCAR Cup Series at Road America); 1956	Succeeded by 2021
