= Glenn Dunaway =

American racing driver (1914–1964)

- Born: Henry Glenn Dunaway; July 6, 1914; Kings Mountain, North Carolina, U.S.
- Died: March 8, 1964 (aged 49); Camden, South Carolina, U.S.
- Cause of death: Grade crossing accident

NASCAR Cup Series career
- 18 races run over 3 years
- Best finish: 9th (1949)
- First race: 1949 Race No. 1 (Charlotte)
- Last race: 1951 Atlanta 100 (Lakewood)
| Wins | Top tens | Poles |
|---|---|---|
| 0 | 8 | 1 |

Henry Glenn Dunaway (July 6, 1914 – March 8, 1964) was an American auto racer noted for initially winning, and then being disqualified from, what is today recognized as NASCAR's first-ever race.

== NASCAR career ==
=== 1949 ===
Dunaway competed in NASCAR first Strictly Stock (now NASCAR Cup Series) race on June 19, 1949. He won the race by three laps over Jim Roper after all 33 cars in the race were overheating. Chief NASCAR inspector Al Crisler disqualified Dunaway's car because car owner Hubert Westmoreland had shored up the chassis by spreading the rear springs, a favorite bootlegger trick to improve traction and handling.

When asked about the illegal modifications, Dunaway responded: "Just one of them deals." The night after the race ended, Dunaway went to Bill France's hotel room at the Alamo Plaza, told France that he knew he had won the race and for France to promptly gave Dunaway his winnings. Westmoreland sued NASCAR for US$10,000, but Greensboro, North Carolina Judge John J. Hayes threw the case out of court, thus setting a legal precedent that recognized NASCAR's power to oversee its races. Dunaway received no money and was credited with finishing last in the 33 car field. Roper was credited with the win in NASCAR's first Strictly Stock race. In 1998, fellow driver Buck Baker recalled various drivers in that race pooled money together for Dunaway so he would not leave penniless; Baker remarked: "he ended up getting more from that than he would have if he'd won the damn race."

Dunaway used his car to compete in five more events in 1949. He finished last at the next event at the Daytona Beach Road Course. He rebounded and finished third at Occoneechee Speedway, ninth at Hamburg Speedway, and seventh at Martinsville Speedway (then a half-mile dirt track). He finished ninth in the final 1949 points standings.

=== 1950–1951 ===
Dunaway competed in seven events in 1950 and had his career-high second-place finish at Canfield Speedway. He had three top-ten finishes. He competed in five events in 1951, with two top-ten finishes. He finished 89th in the final points.

== Death ==
Dunaway died at a train crossing near Camden, South Carolina on Sunday morning, March 8, 1964. He and his passenger Margaret Fox were struck by a Seaboard Air Line Railroad train, throwing Dunaway from his car. He was 49 years old.

== Motorsports career results ==
=== NASCAR ===
(key) (Bold – Pole position awarded by qualifying time. Italics – Pole position earned by points standings or practice time. * – Most laps led.)

==== Grand National Series ====
NASCAR Grand National Series results
| Year | Team | No. | Make | 1 | 2 | 3 | 4 | 5 | 6 | 7 | 8 | 9 | 10 | 11 | 12 | 13 | 14 | 15 | 16 | 17 | 18 | 19 | 20 | 21 | 22 | 23 | 24 | 25 | 26 | 27 | 28 | 29 | 30 | 31 | 32 | 33 | 34 | 35 | 36 | 37 | 38 | 39 | 40 | 41 | NGNC | Pts | Ref |
|---|---|---|---|---|---|---|---|---|---|---|---|---|---|---|---|---|---|---|---|---|---|---|---|---|---|---|---|---|---|---|---|---|---|---|---|---|---|---|---|---|---|---|---|---|---|---|---|
| 1949 | Hubert Westmoreland | 33 | Ford | CLT; 33 | | | | | | | | | | | | | | | | | | | | | | | | | | | | | | | | | | | | | | | | | 9th | 384 | |
| 1949 | Glenn Dunaway | 35 | Lincoln | | DAB; 28 | | | | | | | | | | | | | | | | | | | | | | | | | | | | | | | | | | | | | | | | 9th | 384 | |
| 1949 | Glenn Dunaway | 55 | Olds | | | OCC; 3 | LAN | **HAM**; 9 | MAR; 7 | | | | | | | | | | | | | | | | | | | | | | | | | | | | | | | | | | | | 9th | 384 | |
| 1949 | Glenn Dunaway | 55 | Cadillac | | | | | | | HEI; 18 | NWS | | | | | | | | | | | | | | | | | | | | | | | | | | | | | | | | | | 9th | 384 | |
| 1950 | Glenn Dunaway | 49 | Plymouth | DAB | CLT; 6 | LAN | MAR; 4 | CAN; 2 | VER; 21 | DSP | MON | CLT; 12 | | | | | | | | | | | | | | | | | | | | | | | | | | | | | | | | | 141st | 0 | |
| 1950 | Glenn Dunaway | 49 | Olds | | | | | | | | | | OCC; 24 | DSP | HAM | | | | | | | | | | | | | | | | | | | | | | | | | | | | | | 141st | 0 | |
| 1950 | Glenn Dunaway | 49 | Lincoln | | | | | | | | | | | | | DAR; 39 | LAN | NWS | VER | MAR | WIN | OCC | | | | | | | | | | | | | | | | | | | | | | | 141st | 0 | |
| 1951 | Glenn Dunaway | 55 | Plymouth | DAB | CLT | NMO | CAR | OCC; 10 | ARI | | | | | | | | | | | | | | | | | | | | | | | | | | | | | | | | | | | | 89th | 0 | |
| 1951 | Glenn Dunaway | 155 | Plymouth | | | | | | | NWS; 8 | MAR; 15 | CAN | CLS | CLB | DSP | CAR | GRS | BAI | HEI | ASW | MCF | ALS | MSF | FOM | MOR | GRP | DAR | CLB | MGR | LAN | CLT | DSP | WIL | OCC | THO | PIG | MAR | OAK | | | | | | | 89th | 0 | |
| 1951 | Glenn Dunaway | | Nash | | | | | | | | | | | | | | | | | | | | | | | | | | | | | | | | | | | | NWS; 17 | MAB | JAC | | | | 89th | 0 | |
| 1951 | Glenn Dunaway | | Plymouth | | | | | | | | | | | | | | | | | | | | | | | | | | | | | | | | | | | | | | | LKW; 14 | CAR | NMO | 89th | 0 | |

== Links ==
- Story of NASCAR's first race
- Why the Double Standard?
- 'One-win wonders' a colorful crowd
