= 1956 Virginia 500 =

Auto race held at Martinsville Speedway in 1956

Race details
- Race 18 of 56 in the 1956 NASCAR Grand National Series season
- 1965 Virginia 500 program cover
- Date: April 25, 1956
- Official name: Virginia 500
- Location: Martinsville Speedway, Martinsville, Virginia
- Course: Permanent racing facility
- Course length: 0.525 miles (0.844 km)
- Distance: 500 laps, 262.5 mi (442.4 km)
- Weather: Temperatures of 67.7 °F (19.8 °C); wind speeds of 11.16 miles per hour (17.96 km/h)
- Average speed: 60.824 miles per hour (97.887 km/h)
- Attendance: 20,000

Pole position
| Driver | Buck Baker | Carl Kiekhaefer |

Most laps led
| Driver | Speedy Thompson | Carl Kiekhaefer |
- Laps: 259

Winner
| No. 502 | Buck Baker | Carl Kiekhaefer |

Television in the United States
- Network: untelevised
- Announcers: none

The 1956 Virginia 500 was a NASCAR Grand National Series event that was held on May 20, 1956, at Martinsville Speedway in Martinsville, Virginia. As the inaugural event for the NASCAR Grand National Series in Martinsville, this race would set a precedent for all other 500-lap races to follow on this newly paved short track.

== Background ==
A map showing the layout of Martinsville Speedway, the venue where the race was held.

Martinsville Speedway is one of five short tracks to hold NASCAR races. The standard track at Martinsville Speedway is a four-turn short track oval that is 0.526 miles (0.847 km) long. The track's turns are banked at eleven degrees, while the front stretch, the location of the finish line, is banked at zero degrees. The back stretch also has a zero degree banking.

== Race report ==
Five hundred laps took place on a paved oval track spanning 0.500 miles (0.805 km) for a grand total of 250 miles (400 km). The time of the race was four hours and three minutes while there were seven cautions for twenty laps. The average speed was 60.824 miles per hour (97.887 km/h) while the pole position speed was 66.103 miles per hour (106.382 km/h).

Buck Baker defeated Speedy Thompson by half a lap. Other notable drivers in the race included Arden Mounts, Cotton Owens, Fireball Roberts, Tiny Lund, Paul Goldsmith, and Lee Petty. The winning vehicle was a 1956 Dodge Coronet. Thirty-five American drivers started the race. It would be the first time that a driver with the number 502 would win a race. Joe Bill O'Dell crashed on lap 37 causing his vehicle to have all four wheels off the ground.

A vehicle made by the Packard Motor Car Company qualified for the race; eventually finishing in 34th place due to a tire problem. Years later, the Packard Motor Company would be victimized by the "Big Three" automobile manufacturers and would close due to lack of sales.

Shorty Johns and Carl Kiekhaefer were the two most notable crew chiefs to attend this race.

Twenty thousands fans were on hand to watch the race. The total winnings of the race was $10,275 ($118,835 when considering inflation). Buck Baker received $3,100 for the victory. ($35,853 when considering inflation).

A race lineup sheet for the 1956 Virginia 500.

== Qualifying ==
According to the official lineup sheet from the official program, the first 20 cars would qualify based on speed. Then, positions 21-30 would be based on their positions on a 10 lap qualifying race. Positions 31-40, those who would DNQ on Saturday, would be decided on who got to the track first, i.e. the first driver would get 31st, the second would get 32nd, etc. Buck Baker would win the pole with a 27.230.

| Grid | No. | Driver | Manufacturer | Owner | Time | Avg. Speed |
|---|---|---|---|---|---|---|
| 1 | 502 | Buck Baker | '56 Dodge | Carl Kiekhaefer | 27.230 | 66.125 |
| 2 | 500 | Speedy Thompson | '56 Dodge | Carl Kiekhaefer | 27.290 | 65.930 |
| 3 | 92 | Herb Thomas | '56 Chevrolet | Herb Thomas | 27.540 | 65.450 |
| 4 | 75 | Jim Paschal | '56 Mercury | Frank Hayworth | 27.550 | 65.115 |
| 5 | 42 | Lee Petty | '56 Dodge | Petty Enterprises | 27.590 | 65.103 |
| 6 | 7A | Bobby Johns | '56 Chevrolet | Shorty Johns | 27.840 | 64.745 |
| 7 | X | Rex White | '56 Chevrolet | Max Welborn | 27.890 | 64.515 |
| 8 | 3 | Paul Goldsmith | '56 Chevrolet | Smokey Yunick | 28.040 | 64.285 |
| 9 | 2 | Gwyn Staley | '56 Chevrolet | Hubert Westmoreland | 28.090 | 64.055 |
| 10 | 285 | Don Carr | '56 Pontiac | Jim Stephens | 28.110 | 64.053 |
| 11 | 286 | Cotton Owens | '56 Pontiac | Jim Stephens | 28.220 | 63.825 |
| 12 | 1 | Bobby Myers | '55 Chevrolet | unknown | 28.360 | 63.600 |
| 13 | 14 | Billy Myers | '56 Mercury | Bill Stroppe | 28.380 | 63.380 |
| 14 | 150 | Fred Lorenzen | '56 Chevrolet | Fred Lorenzen | 28.410 | 63.371 |
| 15 | 12 | Ralph Moody | '56 Ford | Pete DePaolo | 28.420 | 63.368 |
| 16 | 11 | Tim Flock | '56 Chevrolet | Mauri Rose | 28.480 | 63.255 |
| 17 | 6 | Ralph Liguori | '56 Dodge | Ralph Liguori | 28.490 | 63.201 |
| 18 | 22 | Fireball Roberts | '56 Ford | Pete DePaolo | 28.560 | 62.935 |
| 19 | 418 | Sherman Utsman | '56 Chevrolet | unknown | 28.670 | 62.715 |
| 20 | 95 | Bob Duell | '56 Ford | Julian Buesink | 28.680 | 62.712 |
| 21 | 91 | Jack Smith | '56 Chevrolet | Ted Chester | 29.180 | 61.640 |
| 22 | 55 | Tiny Lund | '56 Pontiac | A.L. Bumgarner | 28.910 | 62.265 |
| 23 | 204 | Darvin Randahl | '56 Ford | Darvin Randahl | 29.330 | 61.143 |
| 24 | 32 | Ted Cannady | '56 Chevrolet | Ted Cannady | 29.010 | 62.065 |
| 25 | 9 | Pee Wee Jones | '56 Ford | unknown | 29.010 | 62.065 |
| 26 | 264 | Johnny Allen | '55 Plymouth | Spook Crawford | 29.710 | 60.605 |
| 27 | 195 | Jim Rhoades | '55 Packard | Jim Rhoades | 33.420 | 53.890 |
| 28 | 18 | Arden Mounts | '56 Pontiac | Arden Mounts | 34.470 | 52.170 |
| 29 | 209 | Pete Stewart | '56 Plymouth | Pete Stewart | 30.600 | 58.820 |
| 30 | 16 | Ray Chaike | '56 Chevrolet | Gus Holzmueller | 0.000 | 0.000 |
| 31 | 59 | Blackie Pitt | '56 Plymouth Fury | Brownie Pitt | 0.000 | 0.000 |
| 32 | 211 | George Cork | '55 Plymouth | unknown | 0.000 | 0.000 |
| 33 | 19 | Harvey Henderson | '56 Ford | Harvey Henderson | 0.000 | 0.000 |
| 34 | 240 | Reitzel Darner | '56 Ford | Rat Garner | 0.000 | 0.000 |
| 35 | 35 | Joe Bill O'Dell | '55 Rambler | Joe Gilliam | 0.000 | 0.000 |

=== Timeline ===
Section reference:

- Start of race: Speedy Thompson started the race with the pole position.
- Lap 8: Piston issues caused Ralph Liguori to become the last-place finisher.
- Lap 25: Jim Rhoades' "road to success" came to a dead end with tire problems.
- Lap 29: Bob Duell had a terminal crash, forcing him out of the race.
- Lap 37: Joe Bill O'Dell had a terminal crash, he was forced to exit the race.
- Lap 69: Tim Flock had a terminal crash, forcing him to exit the race.
- Lap 149: A non-functioning piston crushed Darvin Randahl's hopes of winning the race.
- Lap 156: Transmission issues brought down Ted Cannady.
- Lap 216: Buck Baker took over the lead from Speedy Thompson.
- Lap 222: Herb Thomas takes over the lead from Buck Baker.
- Lap 243: Cotton Owen's race weekend was devastated by a troublesome right front hub.
- Lap 252: Blackie Pitt's vehicle had a faulty right front hub.
- Lap 293: Bearing issues caused Jim Paschal to exit the event early.
- Lap 304: Lug bolt problems ended Don Carr's weekend on the track.
- Lap 338: Speedy Thompson took over the lead from Herb Thomas.
- Lap 356: Pete Stewart's vehicle had a faulty right rear axle.
- Lap 377: Herb Thomas's vehicle had a problematic engine that kept him from finishing the race.
- Lap 382: Buck Baker takes over the lead from Speedy Thompson.
- Lap 436: Bobby Myers developed a faulty right front hub in his vehicle.
- Lap 441: Reitzel Darner developed a faulty right front hub in his vehicle.
- Finish: Buck Baker was officially declared the winner of the event.

== Finishing order ==
Section reference:

| Fin | St | # | Driver | Make | Team/Owner | Sponsor | Laps | Led | Status | Pts | Winnings |
|---|---|---|---|---|---|---|---|---|---|---|---|
| 1 | 1 | 502 | Buck Baker | '56 Dodge | Carl Kiekhaefer | | 500 | 125 | running | | $3,100 |
| 2 | 2 | 500 | Speedy Thompson | '56 Dodge | Carl Kiekhaefer | | 500 | 259 | running | | $1,500 |
| 3 | 5 | 42 | Lee Petty | '56 Dodge | Petty Enterprises | | 497 | 0 | running | | $1,025 |
| 4 | 8 | 3 | Paul Goldsmith | '56 Chevrolet | Smokey Yunick | | 496 | 0 | running | | $750 |
| 5 | 9 | 2 | Gwyn Staley | '56 Chevrolet | Hubert Westmoreland | | 491 | 0 | running | | $600 |
| 6 | 7 | X | Rex White | '56 Chevrolet | Max Welborn | | 483 | 0 | running | | $450 |
| 7 | 19 | 418 | Sherman Utsman | '56 Chevrolet | unknown | | 477 | 0 | running | | $350 |
| 8 | 13 | 14 | Billy Myers | '56 Mercury | Bill Stroppe | | 475 | 0 | running | | $300 |
| 9 | 21 | 91 | Jack Smith | '56 Chevrolet | Ted Chester | | 475 | 0 | running | | $200 |
| 10 | 15 | 12 | Ralph Moody | '56 Ford | Pete DePaolo | Southeastern Dealers | 467 | 0 | running | | $175 |
| 11 | 33 | 19 | Harvey Henderson | '56 Ford | Harvey Henderson | | 464 | 0 | running | | $150 |
| 12 | 22 | 55 | Tiny Lund | '56 Pontiac | A. L. Bumgartner | | 463 | 0 | running | | $100 |
| 13 | 6 | 7A | Bobby Johns | '56 Chevrolet | Shorty Johns | | 458 | 0 | running | | $100 |
| 14 | 34 | 240 | Reitzel Darner | '56 Ford | Rat Garner | | 441 | 0 | rf hub | | $100 |
| 15 | 12 | 1 | Bobby Myers | '55 Chevrolet | unknown | | 436 | 0 | rf hub | | $100 |
| 16 | 18 | 22 | Fireball Roberts | '56 Ford | Pete DePaolo | DePaolo Engineering | 435 | 0 | running | | $75 |
| 17 | 30 | 16 | Ray Chaike | '56 Chevrolet | | | 430 | 0 | running | | $75 |
| 18 | 25 | 9 | Pee Wee Jones | '56 Ford | unknown | | 419 | 0 | running | | $75 |
| 19 | 32 | 211 | George Cork | '55 Plymouth | unknown | | 405 | 0 | running | | $75 |
| 20 | 3 | 92 | Herb Thomas | '56 Chevrolet | Herb Thomas | | 377 | 116 | engine | | $75 |
| 21 | 29 | 209 | Pete Stewart | '56 Plymouth | Pete Stewart | | 356 | 0 | rr axle | | $60 |
| 22 | 28 | 18 | Arden Mounts | '56 Pontiac | Arden Mounts | | 338 | 0 | running | | $60 |
| 23 | 10 | 285 | Don Carr | '56 Pontiac | Jim Stephens | | 304 | 0 | lug bolt | | $60 |
| 24 | 14 | 150 | Fred Lorenzen | '56 Chevrolet | Fred Lorenzen | | 293 | 0 | running | | $60 |
| 25 | 4 | 75 | Jim Paschal | '56 Mercury | Frank Hayworth | C U Later Alligator | 293 | 0 | bearing | | $60 |
| 26 | 31 | 59 | Blackie Pitt | '56 Buick | Brownie Pitt | | 252 | 0 | rf hub | | $60 |
| 27 | 7 | 286 | Cotton Owens | '56 Pontiac | Jim Stephens | | 243 | 0 | rf hub | | $60 |
| 28 | 24 | 32 | Ted Cannady | '56 Chevrolet | Ted Cannady | | 156 | 0 | transmission | | $60 |
| 29 | 23 | 204 | Darvin Randahl | '56 Ford | Darvin Randahl | | 149 | 0 | piston | | $60 |
| 30 | 16 | 11 | Tim Flock | '56 Chevrolet | Mauri Rose | Mauri Rose Engineering | 69 | 0 | crash | | $60 |
| 31 | 26 | 264 | Johnny Allen | '55 Plymouth | Spook Crawford | | 37 | 0 | transmission | | $60 |
| 32 | 35 | 35 | Joe Bill O'Dell | '55 Rambler | Joe Gilliam | | 37 | 0 | crash | | $60 |
| 33 | 20 | 95 | Bob Duell | '56 Ford | Julian Buesink | | 29 | 0 | crash | | $60 |
| 34 | 27 | 195 | Jim Rhoades | '55 Packard | Jim Rhoades | | 25 | 0 | tire | | $60 |
| 35 | 17 | 6 | Ralph Liguori | '56 Dodge | Ralph Liguori | | 8 | 0 | piston | | $60 |

† signifies that the driver is known to be deceased
* Driver failed to finish race

| Preceded by 1955 | Virginia 500 races 1956 | Succeeded by 1957 |
