= Curtis Turner =

American racing driver (1924–1970)

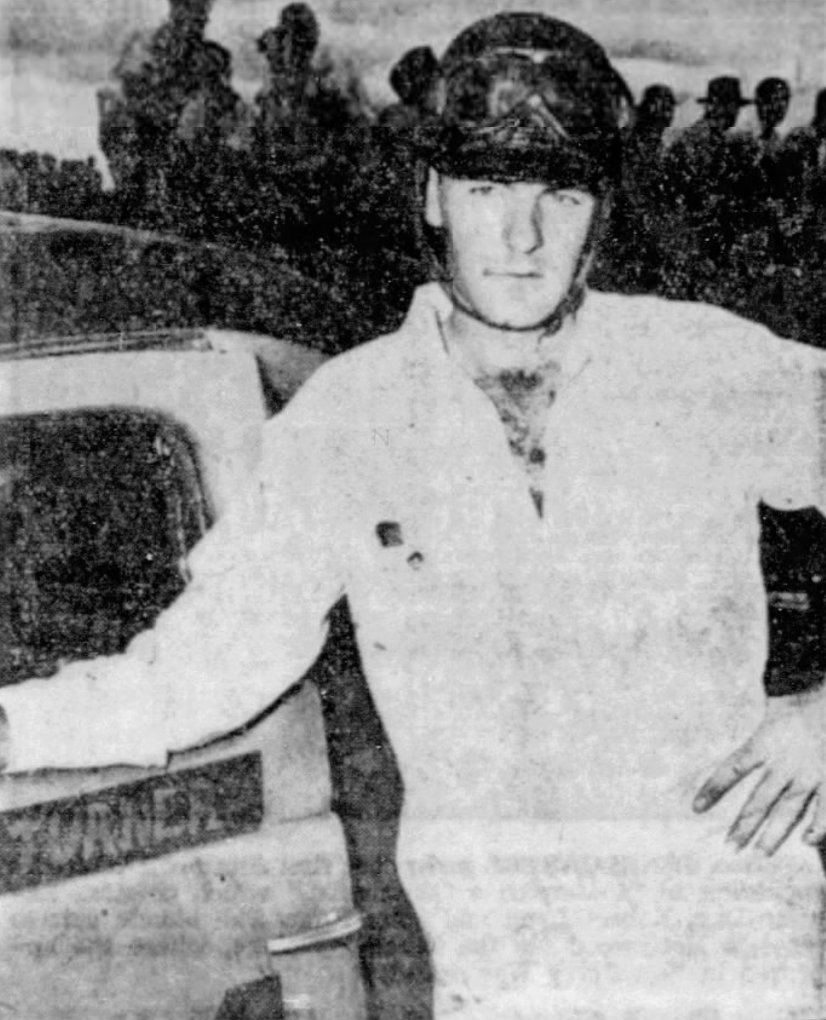
- Turner in 1949
- Born: April 12, 1924; Floyd, Virginia, U.S.
- Died: October 4, 1970 (aged 46); Punxsutawney, Pennsylvania, U.S.
- Cause of death: Airplane crash
- Achievements: 1956 Southern 500 Winner; 1967 Daytona 500 Polesitter Inaugural winner at Rockingham Speedway (1965); Led Grand National Series in wins (1950); Holds record for most career NASCAR Convertible Division wins (38); Holds record for most career NASCAR Convertible Division poles (23); Holds record for most NASCAR Convertible Division wins in a season (22, 1956) Holds record for most NASCAR Convertible Division poles in a season (16, 1956)
- Awards: 1949 and 1956 Grand National Series Most Popular Driver Named one of NASCAR's 50 Greatest Drivers (1998); International Motorsports Hall of Fame (1992); Motorsports Hall of Fame of America (2006); NASCAR Hall of Fame (2016) Named one of NASCAR's 75 Greatest Drivers (2023)

NASCAR Cup Series career
- 184 races run over 17 years
- Best finish: 5th (1950)
- First race: 1949 Race No. 1 (Charlotte)
- Last race: 1968 Hillsboro 150 (Hillsboro)
- First win: 1949 untitled race (Langhorne)
- Last win: 1965 American 500 (Rockingham)
Wins	Top tens	Poles
17	73	16

NASCAR Convertible Division career
- 79 races run over 4 years
- Best finish: 2nd (1956)
- First race: 1956 Race #1 (Daytona Beach & Road Course)
- Last race: 1959 Rebel 300 (Darlington)
- First win: 1956 Race #1 (Daytona Beach & Road Course)
- Last win: 1959 Catawba 250 (Hickory)
Wins	Top tens	Poles
38	53	23
- Statistics up to date as of February 22, 2013.

Curtis Morton Turner (April 12, 1924 – October 4, 1970) was an American stock car racer who won 17 NASCAR Grand National Division races and 38 NASCAR Convertible Division races. Throughout his life, he developed a reputation for drinking and partying. He also fought to form a drivers union, which got him banned by NASCAR founder Bill France Sr. for four years.

== History ==
Turner was born in Floyd, Virginia, to Morton and Minnie Turner on April 12, 1924. He grew up with a brother and two sisters. His father, Morton Turner, was into the moonshine business and had a productive still. Turner was responsible for delivering his father's moonshine to the customers. From a very early age, long before he was old enough for a driver's license, Turner developed his driving talents by running moonshine through the mountains from the law.

Turner was never caught with alcohol, yet came to grief with a 500 lb bag of stolen sugar (for making alcohol) in the post-WWII ration days. After a gunfight escape from the Joint Expeditionary Base–Little Creek where numerous bullet holes pierced the chassis and the lead lodged in the sugar, his more than 300-mile trip under police dragnet to Floyd, Virginia, was successfully achieved by using back roads. However, his father's house was under surveillance, and he was caught with the sugar and incriminating bullet-riddled car. Under oath, Turner convincingly stated a lie of conspiring to produce apple butter, and the judge let him off with a 1,000 dollar fine and a two-year suspended sentence. Locals spoke of how Turner would drive away from the hot pursuit of revenuers and lawmen, and his legendary ability to turn a car 180 degrees in a very small space.

Turner began his racing career in 1946 when he finished 18th in a field of 18 contestants in a race at Mount Airy, North Carolina. However, he rebounded and won his next race. He also was one of the founding members in the original group that met in Daytona Beach at the Streamline Hotel to discuss and support the formation of NASCAR. During his career, he won 360 races in several different racing series, including 22 in the NASCAR Convertible Division in 1956, and 17 wins in the NASCAR Grand National Series. From 1950 to 1954, he drove for Oldsmobile being billed as the Blond Blizzard of Virginia. He switched to driving Fords in 1954. He eventually acquired the nickname of Pops, allegedly because of the way he would "pop" other drivers on the track.

Turner drove a Holman Moody-prepared Studebaker Lark in the two-hour compact car race accompanying the inaugural United States Grand Prix at Sebring, Florida, on December 12, 1959. He finished second overall, trailing the disc-brake-equipped Jaguar 3.4 of Walt Hansgen.

Turner frequently stayed out partying until the early hours, usually with a friend and fellow driver, Joe Weatherly.

== Accomplishments ==
Turner is noted for several other racing accomplishments:

- The only NASCAR driver to win two Grand National races in a row from the pole by leading every lap (Rochester, New York, and Charlotte, North Carolina in July 1950)
- The only win in NASCAR for Nash — Charlotte 150 — April 1, 1951
- The only driver to win 25 major NASCAR races in one season driving the same car in each of them (in 1956 — 22 were won as the #26 car in the convertible division, the other three, including the 1956 Southern 500, were with a top welded on.)
- The only driver to win a major NASCAR race that was red-flagged because his car was the only one still running (at the Asheville-Weaverville, North Carolina track on September 30, 1956.)
- Turner conceptualized, secured financing for, and built Charlotte Motor Speedway in 1960 before being forced out by his business partners.
- The first driver to climb Pikes Peak in less than 15 minutes (in a 1962 Ralph Moody Ford — the actual time was 14 minutes 37 seconds for the 12.42-mile course.)
- The first winner of the American 500 at the Rockingham Speedway (in a 1965 Woods Brothers Ford.)
- The first driver to qualify for a NASCAR Grand National race at a speed greater than 180 miles per hour (1967 Daytona 500, driving #13, a 1967 Smokey Yunick Chevrolet.)
- Turner's 1967 Daytona 500 car designed by Smokey Yunick, seen to the right, was the inspiration for the car driven by the Talladega Nights character Reese Bobby. The car was banned by NASCAR thus starting Smokey's tenuous relationship with NASCAR.
- In 1999, he was inducted into the Virginia Sports Hall of Fame.
- In 2006, he was inducted into the Motorsports Hall of Fame of America.
- In 2016, he was inducted into the NASCAR Hall of Fame.

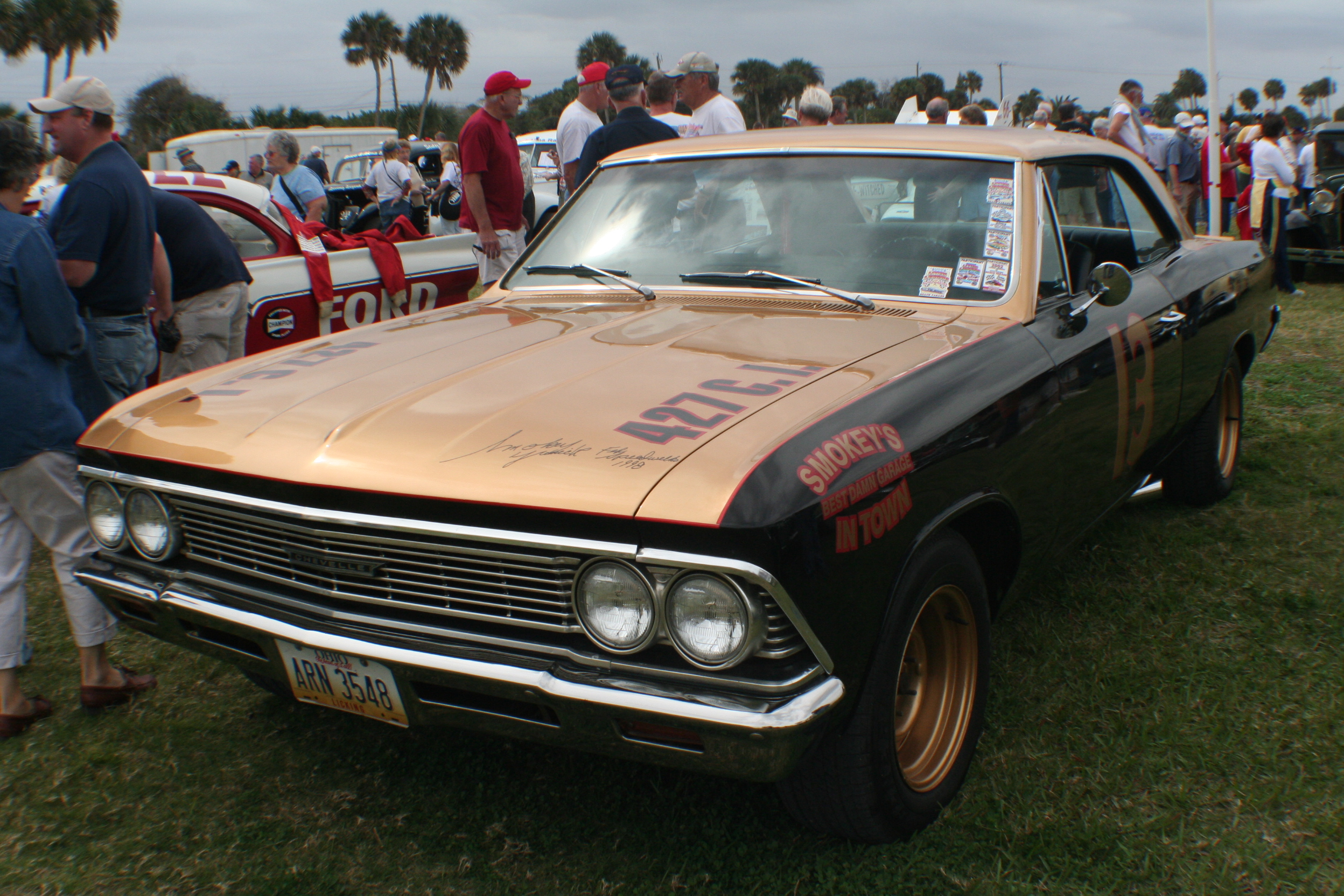
Turner's 1967 Daytona 500 car

== Labor union ==
Needing money to support the newly constructed Charlotte Motor Speedway, Turner and his business partner Bruton Smith turned to the Teamsters Union to organize a union for them, the Federation of Professional Athletes, in 1961. According to The Washington Post: "His aims are for better purses, a share in broadcasting rights and retirement benefits for the drivers." NASCAR founder Bill France Sr. refused to let any driver who was a part of the union race, and eventually all the drivers except for Turner and Tim Flock sided with France. Turner and Flock were banned for life, and Charlotte Motor Speedway went bankrupt before being saved by its board of directors.

Turner continued to race under other sanctioning bodies, including the Midwest Association for Race Cars (MARC), even promoting his 100-mile event on the dirt at Lakewood Speedway, Georgia, in October 1961. Tim Flock finished second in that event. Turner and Flock sued NASCAR and France, "seeking $200,000 punitive damages each and restitution for loss of earnings." "Attorneys for the drivers claim the ban represents a violation of state right to work laws because test driving contracts involving $150 a day plus expenses were canceled as a result of the action. NASCAR and France's attorneys contended the ban isn't a right-to-work violation because it doesn't involve an employer-employee relationship. They said Flock and Turner are individual contractors and not employees of NASCAR or any track."

During his NASCAR ban, Turner attempted a few USAC Championship Cars races. In 1962, he attempted a race at Illinois State Fairgrounds but failed to qualify. In 1963, Turner competed in the season-opener at Trenton International Speedway and finished 12th. He also attempted the 1963 Indianapolis 500 but failed to qualify.

== NASCAR comeback ==
Turner's NASCAR ban was lifted after four years in 1965, and Turner returned to racing. Bill France was in a bind and needed to mend some fences. 1962 and 1963 NASCAR-points champion Weatherly was killed driving a Mercury at Riverside, California on January 19, 1964, and his star driver Fireball Roberts had died following a fiery crash on May 24, 1964, at the World 600 in Charlotte. The track owners wanted Turner back. "Turner was slated to drive for a newly-organized group, The Grand American Racing Association, organized July 31 in Sumter, S.C. Turner was due to compete in the first of 17 scheduled races at Concord, N.C. Aug 21." France was also short of cars. The Chrysler factory was boycotting NASCAR over the organizing body's ban of the Hemi engine, and Richard Petty went drag racing in the first half of the 1965 season. The Ford factory was also in dispute with NASCAR over the SOHC engine, which faced a joint NASCAR-USAC ban on December 17, 1965.

Turner, then 41, soon notched the first victory of his comeback in a Ford at the inaugural American 500, at the North Carolina Motor Speedway, Rockingham, North Carolina, on October 31, 1965, winning a purse of $13,090. Turner lost his Ford ride in 1966 when: "Ford withdrew its factory backed racing teams from competition when the National Association for Stock Car Auto Racing and the United States Auto Club ruled April 6 that Fords equipped with an overhead cam engine must carry 427 additional pounds." Turner started the 1966 season in a Ford, but with the Ford-factory withdrawal, he signed to drive a Chevrolet for Smokey Yunick out of Daytona Beach, Florida.

In 1968, Turner was the first NASCAR driver to appear on the cover of Sports Illustrated.

== Death and legacy ==
Turner died in an airplane crash near Punxsutawney, Pennsylvania on October 4, 1970; the crash also killed golfer Clarence King. Police said the Aero Commander 500 piloted by Turner crashed shortly after taking off from the Dubois-Jefferson Airport en route to Roanoke, Virginia. At the time of the crash, Turner was preparing to compete in that week's National 500 at Charlotte in a special one-off race.

In December 2017, the Virginia Department of Historic Resources approved the erection of a historic marker denoting Turner's birthplace in Floyd County and detailing his accomplishments.

== Motorsports career results ==
=== NASCAR ===
(key) (Bold – Pole position awarded by qualifying time. Italics – Pole position earned by points standings or practice time. * – Most laps led. ** – All laps led.)

==== Grand National Series ====
NASCAR Grand National Series results
Year	Team	No.	Make	1	2	3	4	5	6	7	8	9	10	11	12	13	14	15	16	17	18	19	20	21	22	23	24	25	26	27	28	29	30	31	32	33	34	35	36	37	38	39	40	41	42	43	44	45	46	47	48	49	50	51	52	53	54	55	56	NGNC	Pts	Ref
1949	Curtis Turner	41	Buick	CLT; 9	DAB; 25	HBO; 20																																																						6th	430	
1949	Hubert Westmoreland	41	Olds				LAN; 1*	HAM	MAR; 9	HEI	NWS; 9																																																	6th	430	
1950	Paul Roberts	41	Lincoln	DAB; 11																																																								5th	1375.5	
1950	Eanes Motor Co.	41	Olds		CLT; 15	LAN; 1*	MAR; 1*	CAN; 19*	VER	**DSP**; 4*	**MCF**; 1**	CLT; 1**	HBO; 2*	**DSP**; 23	HAM; 3	**DAR**; 60	LAN; 24	NWS; 22	VER	MAR; 17	WIN	HBO; 29																																						5th	1375.5	
1951	Nash Motors	41	Nash	DAB; 7	CLT; 1*	NMO; 17	GAR	HBO; 27	ASF																																																			NA	-	
1951	Eanes Motor Co.	41	Olds							NWS; 27	MAR; 1	CAN	CLS	CLB	DSP; 1*	GAR	GRS	BAI	HEI	AWS	MCF	ALS	MSF; 9*	FMS	MOR	ABS; 15	DAR; 57	CLB	CCS	LAN	CLT; 19	DSP	WIL	HBO	TPN	PGS	MAR; 14	OAK	NWS	HMS	JSP	ATL	GAR	NMO																NA	-	
1952	Eanes Motor Co.	41	Olds	PBS	DAB; 41	JSP																						DAR; 61	CCS	LAN	DSP	WIL	HBO	MAR	NWS	ATL	PBS																							50th	505	
1952	Eanes Motor Co.	41	Hudson				NWS; 20	MAR; 12	CLB	ATL; 13	CCS	LAN; 37	DAR	DSP	CAN; 5	HAY	FMS	HBO	CLT	MSF	NIF	OSW	MON	MOR	PPS	MCF	AWS																																	50th	505	
1953	Eanes Motor Co.	41	Lincoln	PBS	DAB; 7																																																							10th	3373	
1953	Eanes Motor Co.	41	Olds			HAR; 30	NWS; 22	CLT; 24	RCH	CCS	LAN	CLB	HCY	MAR; 20	PMS; 4	RSP; 14	LOU	FIF	LAN	TCS	WIL	MCF	PIF; 16	MOR	ATL; 14	RVS	LCF	DAV	**HBO**; 1**	**AWS**; 18	**PAS**; 15	HCY		CCS; 11	LAN; 7	BLF	WIL; 11	NWS; 22	MAR; 24	ATL; 16																				10th	3373	
1953	Griffin Motors	44	Olds																														DAR; 3																											10th	3373	
1954	Frank Christian	14	Olds	PBS	DAB; 3		ATL; 7	OSP	OAK	NWS; 4	HBO; 5	CCS; 5	LAN	WIL																																														9th	2994	
1954	Elmer Brooks	44	Olds			**JSP**; 13											RSP; 22	CLT	GAR	CLB; 1*	LND	HCY	MCF	WGS	PIF	AWS	SFS	GRS	MOR	OAK	CLT	SAN	COR	DAR; 2*	CCS	CLT	LAN	MAS	MAR	NWS																				9th	2994	
1954	Carmen Amica	21	Olds												MAR; 3	SHA																																												9th	2994	
1955	Raymond Parks	99	Olds	TCS	PBS	JSP	DAB; 4	OSP; 11	CLB	HBO	NWS; 3	MGY; 4	LAN	CLT	HCY	ASF	TUS	MAR	RCH	NCF	FOR	LIN	MCF	FON	AIR	CLT	PIF	CLB	AWS	MOR	ALS	NYF	SAN	CLT	FOR	MAS	RSP																							34th	1120	
1955	Schwam Motors	99	Ford																																			DAR; 58	MGY	LAN	RSP; 35	GPS					NWS; 20	HBO; 2												34th	1120	
1955	Schwam Motors	95	Ford																																								MAS; 36	CLB	MAR	LVP														34th	1120	
1956	Schwam Motors	99	Ford	HCY; 2	CLT; 7	WSS	PBS; 16	ASF	DAB; 52	PBS; 20	WIL	ATL	NWS	LAN	RCH	CLB; 17	CON	GPS; 2	HCY	HBO; 26	MAR	LIN	CLT; 18	POR	EUR	NYF	MER	MAS	CLT; 2	MCF	POR	AWS	RSP	PIF	CSF	CHI	CCF	MGY	OKL								DAR; 1*	CSH	CLT	LAN	POR	CLB	HBO	NWP	CLT	CCF				20th	2580	
1956	DePaolo Engineering	26	Ford																																					ROA; 24	OBS	SAN	NOR	PIF	MYB	POR											MAR; 28	HCY	WIL	20th	2580	
1957	DePaolo Engineering	C22	Ford	WSS	CON; 21	TIC; 2																																																						22nd	2356	
1957	DePaolo Engineering	99	Ford				DAB; 7	CON; 18	WIL	HBO	AWS	NWS	LAN	CLT	PIF	GBF	POR	CCF	RCH	MAR	POR	EUR	LIN	LCS	ASP	NWP	CLB	CPS	PIF	JAC																														22nd	2356	
1957	Holman-Moody	26	Ford																												RSP; 14	CLT	MAS; 10	POR	HCY; 22	NOR	LCS	GLN	KPC	LIN	OBS	MYB																		22nd	2356	
1957	Smokey Yunick	31	Ford																																								DAR; 11	NYF	AWS	CSF	SCF	LAN	CLB	CCF	CLT	MAR	NBR	CON	NWS					22nd	2356	
1957	Bob Welborn	49	Chevy																																																					GBF; 23				22nd	2356	
1958	Holman-Moody	26	Ford	FAY	DAB; 2								ATL; 1*	**CLT**; 1**	MAR; 6	ODS	OBS			STR; 5	NWS; 7	BGS	TRN; 12	RSD	CLB	NBS	REF	LIN																DAR; 33	CLT	BIR	CSF	GAF	RCH	HBO	SAS	MAR	NWS	ATL						20th	2856	
1958	Holman-Moody	21	Ford			CON; 2*	FAY; 1*	WIL; 13*	HBO; 5																																																			20th	2856	
1958	Holman-Moody	126	Ford							FAY; 4	CLB	PIF																																																20th	2856	
1958	Holman-Moody	2	Ford															GPS; 19	GBF																																									20th	2856	
1958	John Whitford	98	Ford																										HCY; 24	AWS	RSP; 19	MCC	SLS	TOR	BUF	MCF	BEL	BRR	CLB	NSV	AWS																			20th	2856	
1958	Wood Brothers Racing	21	Ford																																							BGS; 22	MBS																	20th	2856	
1959	Doc White	41	Ford	FAY	DAY; 29	DAY; 13	**HBO**; 1*	CON; 1*	ATL	WIL; 2*	BGS; 22																																																	24th	2088	
1959	Carl Rupert	59	Ford									CLB; 15	NWS; 11	REF	HCY	MAR	TRN	CLT	NSV	ASP	PIF	GPS																																						24th	2088	
1959	W. J. Ridgeway	22	Chevy																				ATL; 4	CLB	WIL	RCH	BGS	AWS	DAY	HEI	CLT	MBS	CLT	NSV	AWS	BGS	GPS	CLB	DAR	HCY	RCH	CSF	HBO	MAR	AWS	NWS														24th	2088	
1959	Frank Hayworth	75	Ford																																												CON; 24													24th	2088	
1960	Holman-Moody	26	Ford	CLT	CLB	DAY	DAY; 31	DAY; 7	CLT	NWS	PHO	CLB	MAR	HCY	WIL	BGS	**GPS**; 16*	AWS	DAR					CLT; 39	BGS	DAY	HEI	MAB	MBS																CLT; 32	RCH	ATL													36th	3300	
1960	W. J. Ridgeway	77	Ford																	PIF; 21																																								36th	3300	
1960	Wood Brothers Racing	21	Ford																		HBO; 17	RCH	HMS																																					36th	3300	
1960	Beau Morgan	15	Ford																											ATL; 22	BIR	NSV	AWS	PIF	CLB	SBO	BGS	DAR	HCY	CSF	GSP	HBO	MAR	NWS																36th	3300	
1961	Wood Brothers Racing	21	Ford	CLT	JSP	DAY	DAY; 26	DAY; 55	PIF	AWS	HMS	ATL; 20	GPS	HBO	BGS	MAR	NWS; 14	CLB				DAR; 2	CLT	CLT; 11*	RSD	ASP	CLT; 44	PIF	BIR	GPS	BGS	NOR	HAS	STR	DAY	ATL	CLB	MBS	BRI	NSV	BGS	AWS	RCH	SBO	DAR	HCY	RCH	CSF	ATL	MAR	NWS	CLT	BRI	GPS	HBO					NA	-	
1961	Rex Lovette	21	Pontiac																HCY; 10	RCH	MAR																																							NA	-	
1965	Petty Enterprises	43	Plymouth	RSD	DAY	DAY	DAY	PIF	AWS	RCH	HBO	ATL	GPS	NWS	MAR	CLB	BRI	DAR	LGY	BGS	HCY	CLT	CCF	ASH	HAR	NSV	BIR	ATL	GPS	MBS	VAL	DAY	ODS	OBS	ISP	GLN	BRI	NSV	CCF	AWS	SMR	PIF; DNQ	AUG	CLB	DTS	BLV	BGS													39th	5542	
1965	Sam Fletcher	14	Plymouth																																													DAR; 35												39th	5542	
1965	Junior Johnson & Associates	2	Ford																																														HCY; 22	LIN	ODS	RCH; 36								39th	5542	
1965	Wood Brothers Racing	47	Ford																																																		MAR; 31	NWS; 5	CLT; 3	HBO				39th	5542	
1965	Wood Brothers Racing	41	Ford																																																						CAR; 1*	DTS		39th	5542	
1966	Wood Brothers Racing	41	Ford	AUG	RSD; 4	DAY; 11	DAY	DAY; 25	CAR; 18	BRI	ATL; 13	HCY; 2	CLB	GPS	BGS	NWS	MAR																																											24th	12266	
1966	Smokey Yunick	22	Chevy															DAR; 25	LGY	MGR	MON	RCH; 23																																						24th	12266	
1966	Betty Lilly	24	Ford																				CLT; 41	DTS	ASH	PIF	SMR	AWS	BLV	GPS																														24th	12266	
1966	Smokey Yunick	13	Chevy																												DAY; 4	ODS	BRR	OXF	FON	ISP				**ATL**; 24											CLT; 36	CAR; 34								24th	12266	
1966	Toy Bolton	47	Chevy																																		**BRI**; 30	SMR	NSV			AWS; 30	BLV				RCH; 4	HBO	MAR; 31	NWS; 6										24th	12266	
1966	Junior Johnson & Associates	26	Ford																																						CLB; 3*			BGS; 17	DAR; 14	HCY														24th	12266	
1967	Bill Stroppe	15	Mercury	AUG	RSD; 37																																																							71st	1602	
1967	Yunick-Rich Racing	13	Chevy			**DAY**; 28	DAY	**DAY**; 25	AWS	BRI	GPS	BGS	ATL	CLB	HCY	NWS	MAR	SVH	RCH	DAR	BLV	LGY																																						71st	1602	
1967	Turkey Minton	74	Chevy																				CLT; DNQ	ASH	MGR	SMR	BIR	CAR	GPS	MGY	DAY	TRN	OXF	FDA	ISP	BRI	SMR	NSV	ATL	BGS	CLB	SVH	DAR	HCY	RCH	BLV	HBO	MAR	NWS	CLT; 34	CAR	AWS								71st	1602	
1968	Friedkin Enterprises	14	Plymouth	MGR	MGY	RSD	DAY	BRI	RCH	ATL	HCY	GPS	CLB	NWS	MAR	AUG	AWS	DAR; 15	BLV	LGY	CLT; 9	ASH	MGR; 6	SMR; 4	BIR	CAR	GPS	DAY	ISP	OXF	FDA	TRN	BRI	SMR	NSV	ATL	CLB	BGS	AWS	SBO	LGY	DAR; 6	HCY	RCH	BLV															71st	1602	
1968	Friedkin Enterprises	15	Plymouth																																											HBO; 13	MAR	NWS	AUG	CLT	CAR	JFC								71st	1602	

===== Daytona 500 =====
Year	Team	Manufacturer	Start	Finish
1959	Doc White	Ford	43	13
1960	Holman-Moody	Ford	53	7
1961	Wood Brothers Racing	Ford	33	55
1966	Wood Brothers Racing	Ford	21	25
1967	Yunick-Rich Racing	Chevrolet	**1**	25

== See also ==
- Buck Baker
- Joe Weatherly
