= Tim Flock =

American racing driver (1924–1998)

- Flock, circa 1955
- Born: Julius Timothy Flock; May 11, 1924; Fort Payne, Alabama, U.S.
- Died: March 31, 1998 (aged 73); Charlotte, North Carolina, U.S.
- Cause of death: Liver and throat cancer
- Achievements: 1952 Grand National Series Champion 1955 Grand National Series Champion; 1955, 1956 Daytona Beach Road Course Winner; Highest career winning percentage for a full-time NASCAR driver (21%) Led NASCAR Cup Series in wins 2 times (1952, 1955); 1949 Bowman Gray Stadium Modified Championship
- Awards: 1955 Grand National Series Most Popular Driver; National Motorsports Press Association Hall of Fame (1972); State of Georgia Hall of Fame (1972); International Motorsports Hall of Fame (1991); Charlotte Motor Speedway Court of Legends (1994); Named one of NASCAR's 50 Greatest Drivers (1998); Motorsports Hall of Fame of America (1999); Alabama Sports Hall of Fame (2006); NASCAR Hall of Fame (2014) Named one of NASCAR's 75 Greatest Drivers (2023)

NASCAR Cup Series career
- 187 races run over 13 years
- Best finish: 1st (1952, 1955)
- First race: 1949 Race No. 1 (Charlotte)
- Last race: 1961 World 600 (Charlotte)
- First win: 1950 (Charlotte)
- Last win: 1956 International Stock Car Road Race (Road America)
Wins	Top tens	Poles
39	129	39

NASCAR Convertible Division career
- 4 races run over 2 years
- Best finish: 31st (1957)
- First race: 1957 Race #2 (Daytona Beach & Road Course)
- Last race: 1958 Race #11 (Lakewood)
- First win: 1957 Race #2 (Daytona Beach & Road Course)
Wins	Top tens	Poles
1	3	1
- Statistics up to date as of May 3, 2020.

Julius Timothy Flock (May 11, 1924 – March 31, 1998) was an American stock car racer. He was a two-time NASCAR series champion. His brothers Bob and Fonty Flock also raced in NASCAR, as did his sister Ethel Mobley, NASCAR's second female driver.

== NASCAR career ==
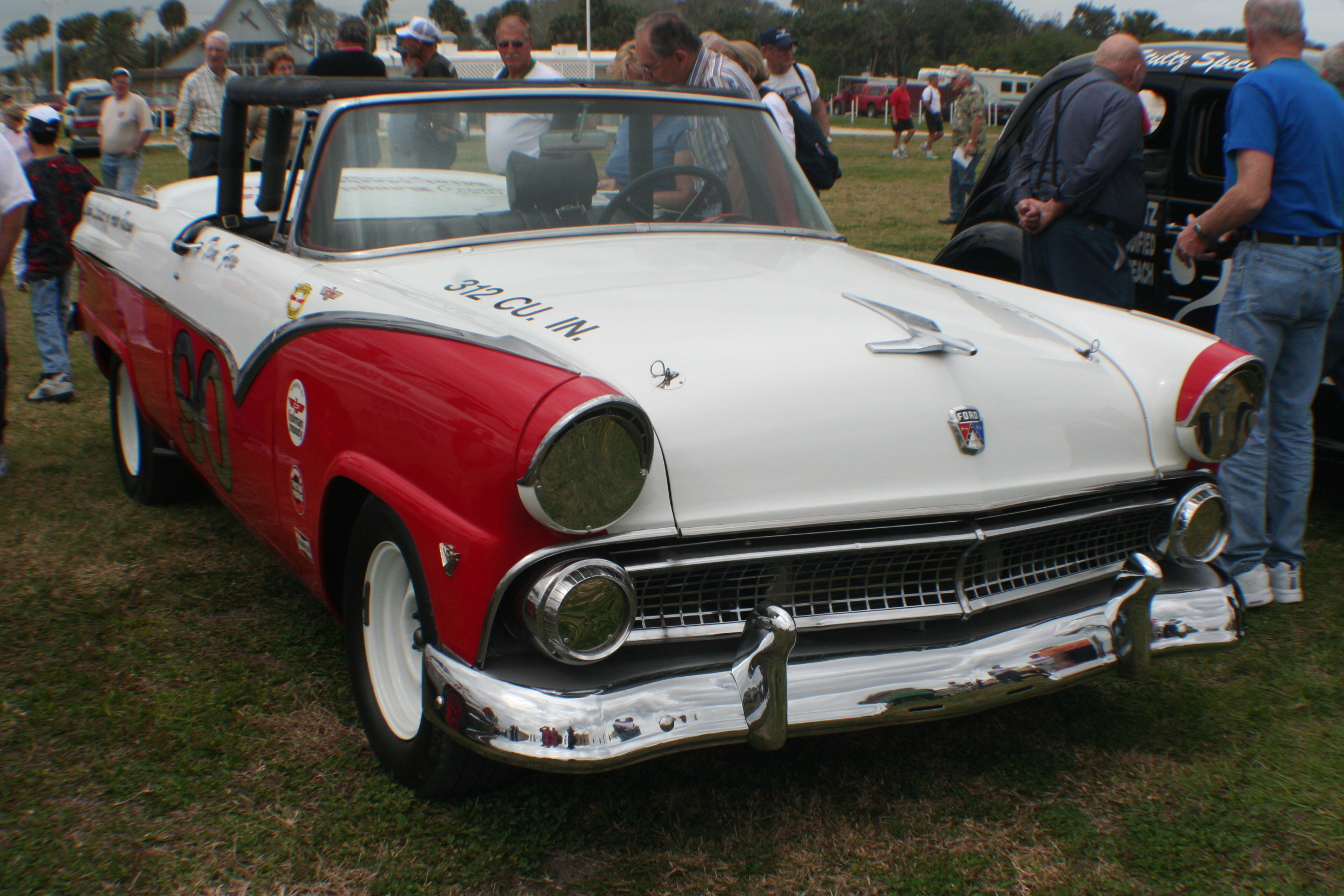
Tim Flock's 1955 Ford

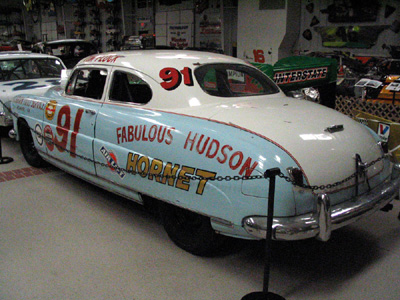
Flock's Fabulous Hudson Hornet

Flock finished fifth in NASCAR's inaugural Strictly Stock race at Charlotte, North Carolina in 1949; he drove an Oldsmobile 88 that he borrowed from his newlywed neighbors. NASCAR's first official season ended with Flock in eighth, his brother Fonty Flock in fifth, and his other brother Bob Flock in third in the overall points standings.

Flock won his first official NASCAR race in 1950 at Charlotte. He ran 12 of 19 races and finished 16th in the final standings. In 1951, Flock won seven races. 1952 brought eight wins and four poles. At the end of the 1952 NASCAR season, Flock had 106 more points than Herb Thomas, earning Flock his first NASCAR Grand National Championship title, despite flipping in the final race at West Palm Beach. Flock later joked, "I was the only driver to ever win a championship upside-down." In 1954, Flock was disqualified despite winning at the Daytona Beach and Road Course for illegally screwed carburetor screws.

Flock had a rhesus monkey co-driver named "Jocko Flocko" with him in his May 16, 1953, Grand National win at Hickory Motor Speedway. Jocko Flocko became the only winning monkey ever. The monkey was retired two weeks later at Raleigh, where the monkey pulled the device to allow the driver to observe the right front tire and was hit by a pebble. At the time, drivers used a device to lift the wheel well to observe tire wear in case of a tire failure. Flock had to do a pit stop to remove the monkey, and he finished third (he would have won without the problem).

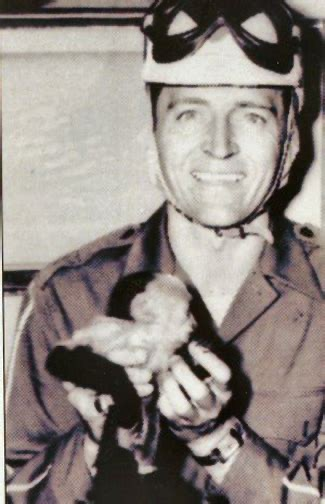

1955 was a record-setting year for Flock as well as NASCAR. On the way to Flock's second Grand National Championship title, Flock had 19 poles and 18 victories in 45 races. The 18 victories stood as a record until broken by "The King", Richard Petty, in 1967. The 19 poles are still the highest number in a NASCAR season.

The 1956 season saw Flock win the International Stock Car Road Race, the first NASCAR Cup event ever held at Road America. Flock followed points leader and pole-sitter Buck Baker for much of the start until many of the leaders began exiting for various problems, allowing Flock to lead the final ten laps. No other stock car events of any type were held at the track until the 1990s, and in 2010 the NASCAR Nationwide Series began racing there. Despite the win, however, the year was filled with off-track frustration for Flock, particularly with team owner Carl Kiekhaefer. Despite their combined on-track success, Flock left Kiekhaefer's team immediately after his victory in the April 8 race at North Wilkesboro Speedway, citing stomach ulcers. Upon departing from the Kiekhaefer camp, he had compiled 21 triumphs out of his 46 starts with Kiekhaefer.

== Labor union ==
In his final race before "retiring", Flock was disqualified and banned from NASCAR as a result of "having too much solder on his carburetor screw" which was illegal. This was widely known by the public to be retaliation by NASCAR management for Flock's support of a NASCAR driver's union. Like Curtis Turner, he faced a life ban from NASCAR. Flock continued to race under other sanctioning bodies, including the Midwest Association for Race Cars, competing in the 100 mi (160 km) event on the dirt at Lakewood Speedway, Georgia, in October 1961, where he finished second. He also raced at a United States Auto Club event in Concord, North Carolina, in 1963. He was reinstated to NASCAR competition in 1966.

Flock was employed by the Ford Motor Company to entertain customers at track events.

== Later years ==
In 1959, Flock was hired by Charlotte Motor Speedway to work in various roles, including public relations and ticket sales.

Flock's last race was the Battle of the NASCAR Legends race at Charlotte Motor Speedway in 1991. The race featured such drivers as Cale Yarborough, Junior Johnson, Pete Hamilton, and Donnie Allison. The winner was Elmo Langley, beating Yarborough to the line by about 3 feet (0.91 m) on the last lap. He finished 10th out of 22 drivers.

== Death ==
Flock died of liver and throat cancer on March 31, 1998, at age 73, during NASCAR's 50th anniversary season. Darrell Waltrip honored him in a special paint scheme named "Tim Flock Special" at Darlington Raceway weeks before Flock died. Flock was without medical insurance, and Waltrip wanted to help raise money for Flock and his family.

A month before his death, Flock was honored as one of NASCAR's 50 Greatest Drivers. He has been inducted in numerous halls of fame, including the: International Motorsports Hall of Fame (1991), Motorsports Hall of Fame of America (1999), National Motorsports Press Association Hall of Fame (1972), State of Georgia Hall of Fame (1972), and Charlotte Motor Speedway Court of Legends (1994). He was inducted in the Alabama Sports Hall of Fame in May 2006. On May 22, 2013, Flock was named a member of the NASCAR Hall of Fame for 2014, to be inducted during Acceleration Weekend in January.

== Motorsports career results ==
=== NASCAR ===
(key) (Bold – Pole position awarded by qualifying time. Italics – Pole position earned by points standings or practice time. * – Most laps led. ** – All laps led.)

==== Grand National Series ====
NASCAR Grand National Series results
Year	Team	No.	Make	1	2	3	4	5	6	7	8	9	10	11	12	13	14	15	16	17	18	19	20	21	22	23	24	25	26	27	28	29	30	31	32	33	34	35	36	37	38	39	40	41	42	43	44	45	46	47	48	49	50	51	52	53	54	55	56	NGNC	Pts	Ref
1949	Buddy Elliott	90	Olds	CLT; 5	DAB; 2	HBO; 7	LAN; 31	HAM	MAR	HEI	NWS; 19																																																	8th	421	
1950	Buddy Elliott	90	Cadillac	DAB; 6																																																								16th	437.5	
1950	Harold Kite	21	Lincoln		CLT; 1*	**LAN**; 4																																																						16th	437.5	
1950	Buddy Elliott	90	Lincoln				MAR; 20	CAN; 9	VER	DSP	MCF	CLT; 9	HBO	DSP	HAM																																													16th	437.5	
1950	Buddy Elliott	9	Olds													DAR; 11	LAN; 19		VER; 4	MAR; 12	WIN																																							16th	437.5	
1950	Frank Christian	75	Olds															NWS; 24																																										16th	437.5	
1950	Hubert Westmoreland	98	Plymouth																			HBO; 4																																						16th	437.5	
1951	Ted Chester	91	Lincoln	**DAB**; 2*																																																								3rd	3722.5	
1951	Ted Chester	91	Olds		CLT; 33	NMO; 1*	GAR	HBO; 4	ASF; 3	NWS; 2	**MAR**; 3	CAN; 2	CLS; 1	CLB; 7	**DSP**; 3	GAR	**GRS**; 4	BAI; 20	HEI; 37	AWS; 11	MCF	ALS	MSF; 17	FMS; 1	**MOR**; 1*	**ABS**; 2	DAR; 11	**CLB**; 1*	CCS; 22	LAN; 5	CLT; 11	DSP	WIL	HBO	TPN; 7	**PGS**; 1**	MAR	OAK	NWS; 4	HMS	JSP; 13																			3rd	3722.5	
1951	Ted Chester	91	Hudson																																							ATL; 1	GAR	NMO; 2																3rd	3722.5	
1952	Ted Chester	91	Hudson	**PBS**; 1*	DAB; 55	JSP; 4	NWS; 21	MAR; 11*	CLB; 18	**ATL**; 15*	CCS; 9	LAN; 2	DAR; 2	DSP; 3	CAN; 4	HAY	FMS; 1*	HBO; 1	CLT; 2	MSF; 1*	NIF; 13	**OSW**; 1	**MON**; 1	MOR; 2	PPS; 1*	MCF; 1*	AWS; 2	DAR; 33	CCS; 3*	LAN; 4	DSP; 6	WIL; 7	HBO; 4	MAR; 4	NWS; 4	ATL; 4	PBS; 12																							1st	6858.5	
1953	Ted Chester	91	Hudson	PBS; 3	DAB; 5	HAR; 7	NWS; 23*	**CLT**; 4*	RCH	CCS; 6	**LAN**; 5	CLB; 2	HCY; 1	MAR; 32	PMS; 22	RSP; 3	LOU; 4	FIF; 5	LAN; 7	TCS; 22	WIL; 7	**MCF**; 4	PIF	MOR	ATL	RVS	LCF	DAV	HBO; 16	AWS; 10	PAS	**HCY**; 7	DAR; 10	CCS; 5	LAN; 39	BLF	WIL	NWS; 13	MAR	**ATL**; 20																				6th	5011	
1954	Ernest Woods	88	Olds	PBS	DAB; 62	JSP	ATL	OSP	OAK	NWS	HBO	CCS	LAN	WIL	MAR	SHA	RSP	CLT	GAR	CLB	LND	HCY	MCF	WGS	PIF	AWS	SFS	GRS	MOR	OAK	CLT	SAN	COR	DAR																										35th	860	
1954	Buck Baker Racing	89	Olds																																**CCS**; 2*	CLT; 9																								35th	860	
1954	Elmer Brooks	44	Olds																																		LAN; 8																							35th	860	
1954		71	Hudson																																			MAS; 22	MAR	NWS																				35th	860	
1955	Carl Kiekhaefer	300	Chrysler	TCS	PBS	JSP	**DAB**; 1**	OSP	**CLB**; 5*	**HBO**; 17	NWS; 13	MGY; 1*	**LAN**; 1**	CLT; 2	**HCY**; 2*			MAR; 1*	RCH; 1*	**NCF**; 25	FOR; 20	LIN; 2	MCF; 1**	**FON**; 2			**PIF**; 1**	CLB; 3	**AWS**; 1**	**MOR**; 1*		**NYF**; 1**	**SAN**; 1	**CLT**; 5		MAS; 3	**RSP**; 2		**MGY**; 1**	**LAN**; 1*	RSP; 3	GPS; 1**	MAS; 4	CLB; 1	MAR; 24	LVP	NWS; 5													1st	9596	
1955	Carl Kiekhaefer	301	Chrysler													ASF; 1**	TUS									**CLT**; 1**					**ALS**; 11				FOR; 7													**HBO**; 1**												1st	9596	
1955	Hubert Westmoreland	2	Chevy																						AIR; 3																																			1st	9596	
1955	Carl Kiekhaefer	16	Chrysler																																			DAR; 3																						1st	9596	
1956	Carl Kiekhaefer	301	Chrysler	**HCY**; 1*																																																								9th	5062	
1956	Carl Kiekhaefer	300	Chrysler		CLT; 2	WSS	PBS	ASF; 3																																																				9th	5062	
1956	Carl Kiekhaefer	300A	Chrysler						**DAB**; 1*			**ATL**; 18*	NWS; 1																																															9th	5062	
1956	Carl Kiekhaefer	501	Dodge							PBS; 7																																																		9th	5062	
1956	Carl Kiekhaefer	300B	Chrysler								WIL; 3																																																	9th	5062	
1956	Smokey Yunick	3	Chevy											LAN; 3																																														9th	5062	
1956	Mauri Rose Engineering	49	Chevy												RCH; 24																																													9th	5062	
1956	Mauri Rose Engineering	1R	Chevy													CLB; 15																																												9th	5062	
1956	Jim Stephens	285	Pontiac														CON; 4	GPS	HCY	HBO																																								9th	5062	
1956	Mauri Rose Engineering	11	Chevy																		MAR; 30	LIN	CLT	POR	EUR	NYF	MER	MAS; 4	CLT; 7	MCF	POR	AWS	RSP; 5	PIF; 10	CSF	CHI	CCF	MGY	OKL																					9th	5062	
1956	Bill Stroppe	15	Mercury																																					ROA; 1	OBS	SAN	NOR	PIF	MYB	POR														9th	5062	
1956	John Foster Motors	86	Ford																																												DAR; 12	**CSH**; 18	CLT	LAN	POR	**CLB**; 16	HBO	NWP; 20	CLT	CCF	MAR	HCY	WIL	9th	5062	
1957	Beau Morgan	15	Mercury	WSS	CON	TIC	DAB; 12	CON	WIL	HBO	AWS	NWS	LAN	CLT	PIF	GBF	POR	CCF	RCH	MAR	POR	EUR	LIN	LCS	ASP	NWP	CLB	CPS	PIF	JAC	RSP	CLT	MAS	POR	HCY	NOR	LCS	GLN	KPC	LIN	OBS	MYB	DAR	NYF	AWS	CSF	SCF	LAN	CLB	CCF	CLT	MAR	NBR	CON	NWS	GBF				NA	-	
1958	Beau Morgan	15	Mercury	FAY	DAB; 46	CON	FAY	WIL	HBO	FAY	CLB	PIF	ATL; 18	CLT	MAR	ODS	OBS	GPS	GBF	STR	NWS	BGS	TRN	RSD	CLB	NBS	REF	LIN	HCY	AWS	RSP	MCC	SLS	TOR	BUF	MCF	BEL	BRR	CLB	NSV	AWS	BGS	MBS	DAR	CLT	BIR	CSF	GAF	RCH	HBO	SAS	MAR	NWS	ATL; 26						NA	-	
1959	Beau Morgan	15	Ford	FAY	DAY; 24	DAY; 9	HBO	CON	ATL	WIL	BGS	CLB	NWS	REF	HCY	MAR	TRN	CLT	NSV	ASP	PIF	GPS	ATL	CLB	WIL	RCH	BGS	AWS	DAY	HEI	CLT	MBS	CLT	NSV	AWS	BGS	GPS	CLB	DAR	HCY	RCH	CSF	HBO	MAR	AWS	NWS	CON													31st	1464	
1960	Beau Morgan	15	Ford	CLT	CLB	DAY	DAY	DAY	CLT	NWS	PHO	CLB	MAR	HCY	WIL	BGS	GPS	AWS	DAR; 9	PIF	HBO	RCH	HMS	CLT	BGS																																			63rd	890	
1960		18	Plymouth																							DAY; 34	HEI	MAB	MBS																															63rd	890	
1960	Ratus Walters	10	Buick																											ATL; DNQ	BIR	NSV	AWS	PIF	CLB	SBO	BGS	DAR	HCY	CSF	GSP	HBO	MAR	NWS	CLT	RCH	ATL													63rd	890	
1961	Jack Meeks	83	Ford	CLT	JSP	DAY	DAY	DAY; 24	PIF	AWS	HMS																																																	NA	-	
1961	Beau Morgan	15	Ford									ATL; 39	GPS	HBO	BGS	MAR; 9	NWS; DNQ	CLB	HCY	RCH	MAR; 7	DAR; 30	CLT	CLT; 6	RSD	ASP	CLT; 37	PIF	BIR	GPS	BGS	NOR	HAS	STR	DAY	ATL	CLB	MBS	BRI	NSV	BGS	AWS	RCH	SBO	DAR	HCY	RCH	CSF	ATL	MAR	NWS	CLT	BRI	GPS	HBO					NA	-	

===== Daytona 500 =====
Year	Team	Manufacturer	Start	Finish
1959	Beau Morgan	Ford	42	9
1961	Jack Meeks	Ford	31	24

== See also ==
- Fireball Roberts

Preceded by Herb Thomas; Lee Petty	NASCAR Grand National Series Champion; 1952; 1955	Succeeded by Herb Thomas; Buck Baker
