= 1961 Rebel 300 =

Auto race held at Darlington Raceway in 1961

Race details
- Race 8 of 28 in the 1961 NASCAR Grand National Series season
- Layout of Darlington Raceway
- Date: May 6, 1961
- Official name: Rebel 300
- Location: Darlington Raceway; Darlington, South Carolina, U.S.
- Course: Permanent racing facility
- Course length: 1.366 miles (2.198 km)
- Distance: 219 laps, 301.3 mi (606.7 km)
- Weather: Very hot with temperatures of 82 °F (28 °C); wind speeds up to 11.1 miles per hour (17.9 km/h)
- Average speed: 119.520 miles per hour (192.349 km/h)

Pole position
Driver	Fred Lorenzen	Holman-Moody
- Time: 153.530 seconds

Most laps led
Driver	Fireball Roberts	Smokey Yunick
- Laps: 108

Winner
No. 28	Fred Lorenzen	Holman-Moody

Television in the United States
- Network: untelevised
- Announcers: none

The 1961 Rebel 300 was a NASCAR Grand National Series event held on May 6, 1961, at Darlington Raceway in Darlington, South Carolina. Two hundred and nineteen laps were run on an oval track spanning 1.375 miles (2.213 km).

== Race report ==
There was only one caution as Fred Lorenzen defeated Curtis Turner by six car lengths. Thirty-two thousand people attended this two-and-a-half-hour-long race. Speeds were 119.520 miles per hour (192.349 km/h) for the average speed and 128.965 miles per hour (207.549 km/h) for the pole speed. The winner received the top prize of $8,420 ($90,717 when adjusted for inflation) while the last-place finisher (32nd) received $200 ($2,155 when adjusted for inflation). Ford had the winning vehicle while Chevrolet's fastest entry was third place.

There were two entries by a 1959 Thunderbird and Pontiac would have its best finish of fourth place. The Dodge driven by Bobby Waddell would finish in 29th and be the only entry for that manufacturer. Most of the DNFs were caused by crashes (the rest were caused by engines, handling, and oil pressure). Richard Petty would be noted for finishing in last place. This would be one of fifteen times in his 35-year-long NASCAR Cup Series career that he would finish a race in the last place position. His final last-place finish would be at the 1989 Holly Farms 400 race at North Wilkesboro Speedway.

Winnings totaled $30,625 ($329,952 when adjusted for inflation) collectively spread throughout the qualifying drivers. Notable crew chiefs for this race were Shorty Johns, Roy Burdick, Mario Rossi, Smokey Yunick and Ray Fox.

The transition to purpose-built racecars began in the early 1960s and occurred gradually over that decade. Changes made to the sport by the late 1960s brought an end to the "strictly stock" vehicles of the 1950s; most of the cars were trailered to events or hauled away by trucks.

=== Qualifying ===
Grid	No.	Driver	Manufacturer	Qualifying time	Speed	Owner
1	28	Fred Lorenzen	'61 Ford	153.530	128.965	Holman-Moody
2	22	Fireball Roberts	'61 Pontiac	154.270	128.346	Smokey Yunick
3	94	Banjo Matthews	'61 Ford	155.580	127.265	Banjo Matthews
4	8	Joe Weatherly	'61 Pontiac	156.340	126.647	Bud Moore
5	72	Bobby Johns	'61 Ford	156.380	126.614	Shorty Johns
6	6	Ralph Earnhardt	'61 Pontiac	156.450	126.558	Cotton Owens
7	29	Nelson Stacy	'61 Ford	156.890	126.203	Dudley Farrell
8	21	Curtis Turner	'61 Ford	156.890	126.203	Wood Brothers
9	69	Johnny Allen	'61 Chevrolet	157.200	125.954	B.G. Holloway
10	53	Bob Burdick	'61 Pontiac	157.920	125.379	Roy Burdick

== Finishing order ==
Section reference:

1. Fred Lorenzen (No. 28)
2. Curtis Turner (No. 21)
3. Johnny Allen (No. 69)
4. Bob Burdick (No. 53)
5. Fireball Roberts (No. 22)
6. Marvin Panch (No. 3)
7. Ralph Earnhardt (No. 6)
8. Banjo Matthews (No. 94)
9. Bobby Johns (No. 72)
10. Ned Jarrett (No. 11)
11. Nelson Stacy (No. 29)
12. Larry Frank (No. 47)
13. Emanuel Zervakis (No. 85)
14. Jimmy Pardue (No. 54)
15. Joe Weatherly (No. 8)
16. Dave Mader (No. 00)
17. G.C. Spencer (No. 48)
18. Tommy Irwin (racing driver) (No. 2)
19. Larry Flynn (No. 82)
20. Buck Baker (No. 87)
21. Ed Livingston (No. 68)
22. Curtis Crider (No. 62)
23. Ed Markstellar (No. 38)
24. Rex White* (No. 4)
25. Buddy Baker* (No. 86)
26. Jimmy Thompson* (No. 55)
27. Tom Dill* (No. 52)
28. Paul Lewis* (No. 1)
29. Bobby Waddell* (No. 71)
30. Tim Flock* (No. 15)
31. Elmo Langley* (No. 61)
32. Richard Petty* (No. 43)

Note: ^{*} denotes that the driver failed to finish the race.

== Timeline ==
Section reference:

- Start of race: Fred Lorenzen officially started the event with the pole position.
- Lap 10: Fred Lorenzen took over the lead from Fireball Roberts before losing it to Joe Weatherly on lap 72.
- Lap 11: Richard Petty's engine problems forced him out of the race.
- Lap 14: Elmo Langley vehicle wasn't able to handle itself properly.
- Lap 16: Vehicle handling issues took Tim Flock out of the race.
- Lap 22: Bobby Waddell's vehicle had terrible oil pressure.
- Lap 38: Oil pressure issues forced Bobby Waddell to leave the track prematurely.
- Lap 46: Tom Dill had a terminal crash; forcing him to retire from the race.
- Lap 62: Jimmy Thompson had a terminal crash; forcing him to retire from the race.
- Lap 81: Fireball Roberts took over the lead from Banjo Matthews before losing it to Curtis Turner on lap 143.
- Lap 115: Buddy Baker had a terminal crash; forcing him to retire from the race.
- Lap 157: Fireball Roberts took over the lead from Johnny Allen before losing it to Curtis Turner on lap 199.
- Lap 173: Rex White had a terminal crash; forcing him to retire from the race.
- Lap 199: Curtis Turner took over the lead from Fireball Roberts before losing it to eventual race-winner Fred Lorenzen on lap 218.
- Lap 218: Fred Lorenzen took over the lead from Curtis Turner; becoming the move that would cause Lorenzen to win the event.
- Finish: Fred Lorenzen was officially declared the winner of the race.
