= 1961 World 600 =

Auto race held at Charlotte Motor Speedway in 1961

Race details
- Race 24 of 52 in the 1961 NASCAR Grand National Series season
- 1961 World 600 program cover
- Date: May 28, 1961
- Official name: World 600
- Location: Charlotte Motor Speedway, Concord, North Carolina
- Course: Permanent racing facility
- Course length: 1.500 miles (2.414 km)
- Distance: 400 laps, 600 mi (965 km)
- Weather: Temperatures of 73 °F (23 °C); wind speeds of 10.1 miles per hour (16.3 km/h)
- Average speed: 111.633 miles per hour (179.656 km/h)
- Attendance: 46,538

Pole position
Driver	Richard Petty	Petty Enterprises

Most laps led
Driver	David Pearson	John Masoni
- Laps: 225

Winner
No. 3	David Pearson	John Masoni

Television in the United States
- Network: ABC
- Announcers: Chris Economaki

The 1961 World 600, the second running of the event, was a NASCAR Grand National Series event that took place on May 28, 1961, at Charlotte Motor Speedway in Concord, North Carolina. Chris Economaki called the race in one of the few televised NASCAR races of the 1960s. A series of two qualifying events took place on May 21 to determine the starting grid for this event.

This race began a streak of 1856 consecutive NASCAR races where at least one of the drivers in the race was from North Carolina. The streak would come to an end after Dale Earnhardt Jr. did not race in the 2012 Bank of America 500 at Charlotte after getting a concussion after the previous race at Talladega.

== Background ==
Charlotte Motor Speedway, a 1.5-mile (2.4 km) quad-oval track located in Concord, North Carolina, was the location for the race. The track's turns were banked at twenty-four degrees, while the front stretch, the location of the finish line, was five degrees. The back stretch, opposite of the front, also had a five degree banking. Charlotte Motor Speedway hosted the NASCAR Grand National Series twice during the season, with the other race being the National 400. The track opened for the inaugural World 600 one year earlier, and was built by Bruton Smith and Curtis Turner. Around 46,538 spectators attended the race.

== Race report ==
Four hundred laps were raced over a paved oval track spanning 1.500 miles (2.414 km) with a time of five hours, twenty-two minutes, and twenty-nine seconds. Seven cautions were waved for fifty-seven laps. David Pearson defeated Fireball Roberts by more than two laps for his first NASCAR Cup series victory. Even though there were 55 cars in the event, only 19 vehicles were allowed to qualify during each pre-race qualifying session.

The average speed was 111.633 miles per hour (179.656 km/h) while the pole position speed was 131.611 miles per hour (211.807 km/h). The qualifying races only set the front row (which is the opposite of what happens before the Daytona 500). A lot of drivers chose not to participate in qualifying.

Attendance for this race was 46,538 and the top prize was $24,280 ($261,591 when adjusted for inflation). The last place competitor received $200 ($2,155 when adjusted for inflation). Competitors for this race included: Ralph Earnhardt, Ned Jarrett, Tiny Lund, Junior Johnson, Joe Weatherly, Richard Petty, and Roy Tyner. Ralph Earnhardt was competitive early, leading four times and finishing 11th.

A terrible crash occurred to driver Reds Kagle; he would lose a leg in this race when his car penetrated the outside guard rail.

Notable crew chiefs for the race were Ray Fox, Bud Allman, Smokey Yunick, Mario Rossi, Roy Burdick, Shorty Johns and Joseph Meyer.

It would be the final race for the future Hall of Famer, Tim Flock.

=== Qualifying ===
Grid	No.	Driver	Manufacturer
1	43	Richard Petty	'61 Plymouth
2	8	Joe Weatherly	'61 Pontiac
3	3	David Pearson	'61 Pontiac
4	20	Marvin Panch	'60 Pontiac
5	28	Fred Lorenzen	'61 Ford
6	6	Ralph Earnhardt	'61 Pontiac
7	18	Tommy Irwin	'61 Pontiac
8	4	Rex White	'61 Chevrolet
9	16	Speedy Thompson	'61 Ford
10	22	Fireball Roberts	'61 Pontiac
11	11	Ned Jarrett	'61 Chevrolet
12	72	Bobby Johns	'61 Ford
13	53	Bob Burdick	'61 Pontiac
14	47	Bob Welborn	'61 Pontiac
15	87	Buck Baker	'61 Chrysler
16	24	Roscoe Thompson	'60 Pontiac
17	85	Emanuel Zervakis	'61 Chevrolet
18	94	Banjo Matthews	'61 Ford
19	46	Jack Smith	'61 Pontiac
20	21	Curtis Turner	'61 Ford

== Finishing order ==
Section reference:

Fin	St	#	Driver	Sponsor	Make	Laps	Led	Status
1	3	3	David Pearson		'61 Pontiac	400	225	running
2	10	22	Fireball Roberts		'61 Pontiac	398	6	running
3	8	4	Rex White		'61 Chevrolet	397	0	running
4	11	11	Ned Jarrett		'61 Chevrolet	397	30	running
5	25	14	Jim Paschal		'61 Pontiac	394	0	running
6	39	30	Tiny Lund		'60 Chevrolet	392	0	running
7	19	46	Jack Smith		'61 Pontiac	392	3	running
8	14	47	Bob Welborn		'61 Pontiac	392	0	running
9	23	27	Junior Johnson		'61 Pontiac	390	0	running
10	2	8	Joe Weatherly		'61 Pontiac	389	14	running
11	6	6	Ralph Earnhardt		'61 Pontiac	386	75	running
12	30	1	Paul Lewis		'61 Chevrolet	386	0	running
13	33	82	Joe Eubanks		'61 Ford	384	0	running
14	37	10	T.C. Hunt		'61 Dodge	376	0	running
15	17	85	Emanuel Zervakis		'61 Chevrolet	375	0	running
16	54	93	Lee Reitzel		'60 Ford	371	0	running
17	44	61	Elmo Langley		'59 T-Bird	371	0	running
18	43	96	Friday Hassler		'60 Chevrolet	368	0	running
19	12	72	Bobby Johns		'61 Ford	367	0	running
20	7	18	Tommy Irwin		'61 Pontiac	361	0	driveshaft
21	38	5	Bobby Waddell		'59 Chevrolet	361	0	running
22	41	38	Ed Markstellar		'61 Ford	360	0	running
23	48	23	Doug Yates		'61 Plymouth	358	0	running
24	42	19	Herman Beam		'60 Ford	357	0	running
25	49	57	Wes Morgan		'61 Chevrolet	347	0	running
26	32	86	Buddy Baker		'61 Chrysler	342	0	rear end
27	13	53	Bob Burdick		'61 Pontiac	338	0	crash
28	18	94	Banjo Matthews		'61 Ford	336	0	engine
29	36	80	Tubby Gonzales		'61 Ford	336	0	rear end
30	1	43	Richard Petty		'61 Plymouth	332	47	engine
31	26	48	G.C. Spencer		'60 Chevrolet	325	0	running
32	55	71	Bob Barron		'60 Dodge	291	0	flagged
33	21	69	Johnny Allen		'61 Chevrolet	283	0	rear end
34	29	2	Reds Kagle		'61 Ford	277	0	crash
35	5	28	Fred Lorenzen		'61 Ford	274	0	a frame
36	50	9	Roy Tyner		'60 Ford	266	0	crash
37	24	15	Tim Flock		'61 Ford	255	0	engine
38	45	68	Ed Livingston		'60 Ford	254	0	engine
39	35	54	Jimmy Pardue		'60 Chevrolet	221	0	bell housing
40	46	62	Curtis Crider		'61 Mercury	203	0	crankshaft
41	9	16	Speedy Thompson		'61 Ford	186	0	camshaft
42	15	87	Buck Baker		'61 Chrysler	147	0	overheating
43	4	20	Marvin Panch		'60 Pontiac	140	0	crash
44	20	21	Curtis Turner		'61 Ford	139	0	crash
45	31	44	Marvin Porter		'60 Plymouth	136	0	engine
46	22	29	Nelson Stacy		'61 Ford	128	0	bearing
47	34	66	Jimmy Thompson		'60 Ford	113	0	axle
48	53	31	Gene Stokes		'61 Studebaker	95	0	oil pressure
49	27	7	Jim Reed		'61 Chevrolet	93	0	valve spring
50	16	24	Roscoe Thompson		'60 Pontiac	70	0	clutch
51	47	40	Bobby Allison		'60 Chevrolet	53	0	axle
52	28	89	Joe Lee Johnson		'61 Chevrolet	40	0	crash
53	40	75	Larry Frank		'61 Pontiac	10	0	timing
54	51	51	Doug Cox		'59 T-Bird	6	0	engine
55	52	35	E.J. Trivette		'59 Plymouth	3	0	axle

== Timeline ==
Section reference:

- Start: Joe Weatherly was leading the pack as the cars officially crossed the start/finish line.
- Lap 2: David Pearson took over the lead from Joe Weatherly.
- Lap 3: Joe Weatherly took over the lead from David Pearson; E.J. Trivette's vehicle suddenly developed problems with its axle.
- Lap 6: Doug Cox fell out with engine failure.
- Lap 10: The timing on Larry Frank's vehicle became abnormal.
- Lap 16: Ralph Earnhardt took over the lead from Joe Weatherly.
- Lap 34: Jack Smith took over the lead from Ralph Earnhardt.
- Lap 37: Ralph Earnhardt took over the lead from Jack Smith.
- Lap 40: Joe Lee Johnson inflicted terminal vehicle damage.
- Lap 49: David Pearson took over the lead from Ralph Earnhardt.
- Lap 53: Ralph Earnhardt took over the lead from David Pearson; the axle on Bobby Allison's vehicle developed problems.
- Lap 70: David Pearson took over the lead from Ralph Earnhardt; the clutch on Roscoe Thompson's vehicle started acting abnormally.
- Lap 81: Ned Jarrett took over the lead from David Pearson.
- Lap 93: The valve spring on Jim Reed's vehicle started acting strangely.
- Lap 95: The oil pressure on Gene Stokes' vehicle suddenly became abnormal.
- Lap 111: Ralph Earnhardt took over the lead from Ned Jarrett.
- Lap 113: Axle problems took Jimmy Thompson out of the race.
- Lap 128: Problems with the vehicle's bearing took Nelson Stacy out of the race.
- Lap 136: Marvin Porter fell out with engine failure.
- Lap 139: David Pearson took over the lead from Ralph Earnhardt; Curtis Turner inflicted terminal vehicle damage.
- Lap 140: Marvin Panch inflicted terminal vehicle damage.
- Lap 147: Buck Baker managed to overheat his vehicle.
- Lap 178: Richard Petty took over the lead from David Pearson.
- Lap 201: Fireball Roberts took over the lead from Richard Petty.
- Lap 207: David Pearson took over the lead from Fireball Roberts.
- Lap 248: Richard Petty took over the lead from David Pearson.
- Lap 254: Ed Livingston managed to overheat his vehicle.
- Lap 255: Tim Flock managed to overheat his vehicle.
- Lap 272: David Pearson took over the lead from Richard Petty.
- Lap 277: Reds Kagle inflicted terminal vehicle damage.
- Lap 283: The rear end of Johnny Allen's vehicle became dangerously loose.
- Lap 291: Bob Barron was disqualified from the race by the virtue of the black flag.
- Lap 332: Richard Petty fell out with engine failure.
- Lap 336: Tubby Gonzales's vehicle developed a dangerously loose rear end; Banjo Matthews fell out with engine failure.
- Lap 338: Bob Burdick fell out with engine failure.
- Lap 342: The rear end of Buddy Baker's vehicle became dangerously loose.
- Finish: David Pearson was officially declared the winner of the event.

Preceded by 1961 untitled race at Ascot Stadium	NASCAR Grand National Races; 1961	Succeeded by 1961 untitled race at Piedmont Interstate Fairgrounds
