= Hubert Westmoreland =

NASCAR team owner

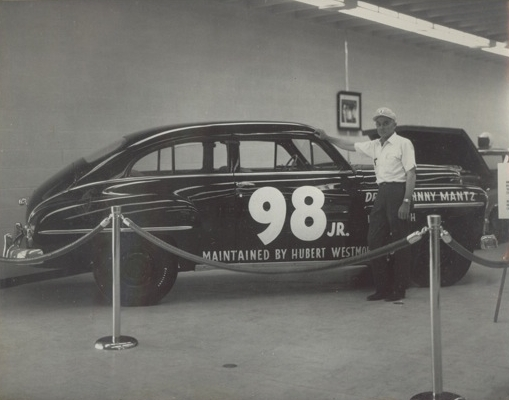
- Westmoreland with his Mantz-driven Plymouth at Darlington Museum
- Born: January 28, 1915; Burlington, North Carolina
- Died: October 26, 2006 (aged 91)
- Occupation: Racecar owner
- Years active: 1949–1964

Hubert Westmoreland (January 28, 1915 – October 26, 2006) was a mechanic that became a car owner in the beginning of NASCAR. His role as a car owner ran from 1949 to 1964. In that time his cars were driven to four first-place finishes. In the 1949 NASCAR Strictly Stock Series inaugural race, Westmoreland was the owner of the car driven by Glenn Dunaway. Dunaway was the initial winner but he was disqualified when it was found that the rear springs had been spread by Westmoreland, a noted bootlegger who had knowledge of improving handling that way. Westmoreland sued NASCAR but lost in court.

Westmoreland's most notable victory was by Johnny Mantz, who drove his Plymouth to victory in the inaugural Southern 500 at Darlington Raceway in Darlington, South Carolina. His best finish at Daytona Beach Road Course was third, although when Mantz won the 1950 Southern 500, it was like winning the Daytona 500. Daytona International Speedway was not around until 1959.

A few of the other drivers that drove Westmoreland's cars were: Curtis Turner (whom Westmoreland claimed was the best stock car driver he ever saw), Tim Flock, Bill Holland, Jack Smith, Frankie Schneider, and Herb Thomas.
