= Daytona Beach and Road Course =

Motorsport track in the United States

The Beach
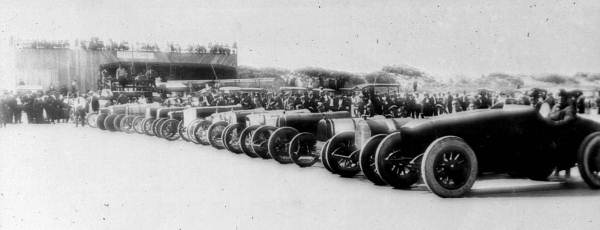
- Location: Daytona Beach, Ponce Inlet, Daytona Beach Shores, Florida
- Owner: Public
- Operator: Closed
- Opened: 1902
- Closed: February 23, 1958
- Major events: Site of the first NASCAR sanctioned race

Road course
- Length: 3.1 to 4.2 mi (5.0 to 6.7 km)

The Daytona Beach and Road Course was a motorsport race track that was instrumental in the formation of the National Association for Stock Car Auto Racing (NASCAR). It originally became famous as the location where 15 world land speed records were set.

== Beach and road course ==
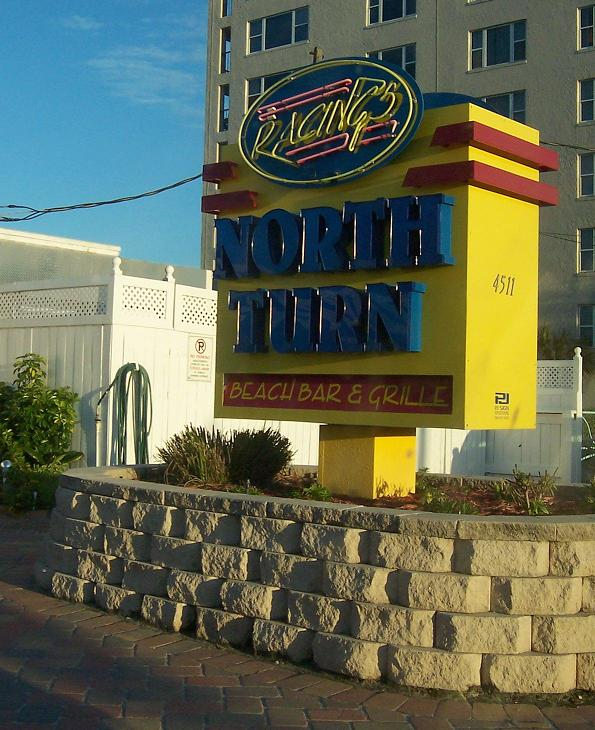
A restaurant now stands near the location of the north turn

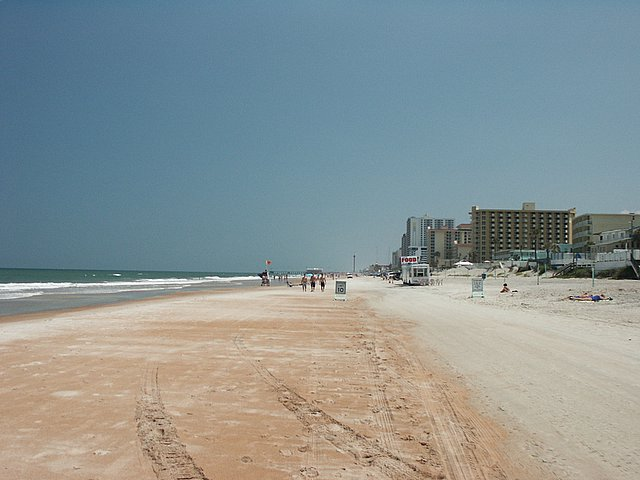
The beach in 2006

=== Track layout ===
The course started on the pavement of highway A1A (at 4511 South Atlantic Avenue, Ponce Inlet 29.108890°N 80.943669°W). A restaurant named "Racing's North Turn" now stands at that location. It went south 2 mi (3.2 km) parallel to the ocean on A1A (S. Atlantic Ave) to the end of the road, where the drivers accessed the beach at the south turn at the Beach Street approach 29.084705°N 80.925566°W, returned 2 miles (3.2 km) north on the sandy beach surface, and returned to A1A at the north turn. The lap length in early events was 3.2 mi (5.1 km), and it was lengthened to 4.2 mi (6.8 km) in the late 1940s. In the video game NASCAR Thunder 2004 by EA Sports, the course is shortened to about half its distance, but still shows how the basic course was set up.

=== Early events ===
On March 29, 1927, Major Henry Segrave and his Sunbeam 1000 hp Mystery set a world land speed record on the Daytona Beach and Road Course, at 203.79 mph (327.97 km/h), peaking at a top speed of 211 mph (340 km/h).
Washington, DC resident William France, Sr. was familiar with the history of Daytona. He moved there in 1935 to escape the Great Depression and he set up a car repair shop.

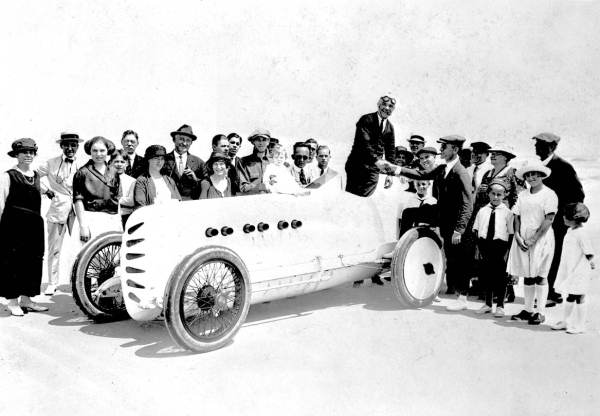
Sig Haugdahl shaking hands with Mayor Guy S. Bailey of Daytona Beach

Daytona Beach officials asked local racer Sig Haugdahl to organize and promote an automobile race along the 3.2 mi (5.1 km) course in 1936. Haugdahl is credited for designing the track. The city posted a $5,000 purse. The ticket-takers arrived at the event on March 8 to find thousands of fans already at the track. The sandy turns became virtually impassable, which caused numerous scoring disputes and technical protests. The event was stopped after 75 of 78 laps. Milt Marion was declared the winner by the AAA (the sanctioning body). Second-place finisher Ben Shaw and third-place finisher Tommy Elmore protested the results, but their appeals were overturned. France finished fifth in the event. The city lost a reported $22,000 ($510432 in 2016 dollars), and has not promoted an event since.

Haugdahl talked with France, and they talked the Daytona Beach Elks Club into hosting another event in 1937. The event was more successful, but still lost money. Haugdahl did not promote any more events.

France took over the job of running the course in 1938. Two events were held that year. Danny Murphy beat France in the July event, which made $200. France beat Lloyd Moody and Pig Ridings to win the Labor Day weekend event, this time making $20,000.

Three races were held in 1939, and in three races in 1940, France finished fourth in March, first in July, and sixth in September.

Lloyd Seay finished fourth in the July 27, 1941, event after rolling twice. He returned on August 24 that year to win the event. He was killed by a family member in a dispute over the family moonshine business nine days later.

Roy Hall won on the course several times.

France was busy planning the 1942 event, until the Japanese bombed Pearl Harbor; he spent World War II working at the Daytona Boat Works. Most racing stopped until after the war. Car racing returned to the track in 1946.

=== NASCAR formation ===
France knew that promoters needed to organize their efforts. Drivers were frequently victimized by unscrupulous promoters who would leave events with all the money before drivers were paid. On December 14, 1947, France began talks at the Ebony Bar at the Streamline Hotel at Daytona Beach, Florida, that ended with the formation of NASCAR on February 21, 1948. The Daytona Beach and Road Course hosted the premiere event of the fledgling series until Darlington Speedway was completed in 1950.

Cars racing down A1A at the 1956 race

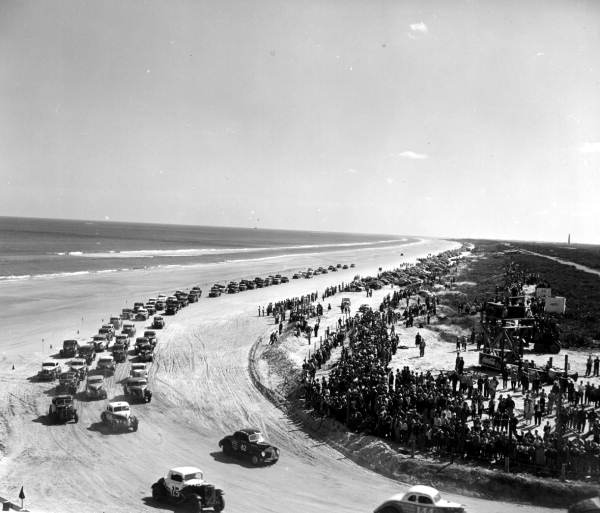
Cars racing into the north turn (looking south).

NASCAR held a modified division race at the track on February 15, 1948. Red Byron beat Marshall Teague. NASCAR had several divisions in its early years.

=== NASCAR race results ===
1949

The first NASCAR Strictly Stock Series race was held in 1949 at the Charlotte Speedway. The second race on the series schedule was held at Daytona Beach in July; 28 cars raced, including Curtis Turner, Buck Baker, Bob Flock, Fonty Flock, Marshall Teague, Herb Thomas, and second-place finisher Tim Flock. Red Byron scored for his fourth win at the track in the decade. Byron went on to win the series’ first championship in his 1949 Oldsmobile.

1950

The Strictly Stock series was renamed the Grand National Series. The race was moved to February, which becomes a tradition still held to this day with the modern Daytona 500. Harold Kite won the race in a 1949 Lincoln. He took the lead on lap 25 when Red Byron pitted with gearshift problems. Kite led the rest of the way. Byron surged from seventh to finish second. A second race was added to the weekend, the 100-mile (160 km) Modified Stock race, the day before. Gober Sosebee won.

1951

Marshall Teague glided his 1951 Fabulous Hudson Hornet into victory lane for his first career victory. He beat Tim Flock by 1 minute and 14 seconds. Gober Sosebee won the Modified Stock race for the second year in a row.

1952

Teague made it two in a row in his 1952 Hudson. He gained the lead on lap two. The race was shortened by two laps because of an incoming tide. Teague won by 1 minute and 21 seconds over Herb Thomas. A day earlier, Tim Flock was flagged the winner at the Modified/Sportsman race, but was disqualified for having wooden rollbars and 2nd place runner up Jack Smith was declared the winner of the Modified/Sportsman race.

1953

Polesitter Bob Pronger and second-place starter Fonty Flock had a bet as to who would lead the first lap. They both raced wildly into the north corner. Pronger went too fast into corner, and wrecked his car. Flock had over a one-minute lead in the race, but ran out of gas taking the white flag at the start of the final lap. Flock's teammate pushed his car into the pits. Bill Blair passed to win the race in a 1953 Oldsmobile. Flock finished second by 26 seconds.

In the 100-mile (160 km) Modified/Sportsman race that year, 136 cars started, making it the largest field ever in any NASCAR-sanctioned event. Cotton Owens was the victor.

1954

The "Speedweeks" weekend was expanded to three events, the 100-mile (160 km) Sportsmen race, the 125-mile (201 km) Modified race, and the 160-mile (260 km) main event. Dick Joslin and Cotton Owens won the preliminaries, respectively. Tim Flock finished the main event first, but was disqualified on a minor technicality. Second-place finisher Lee Petty edged out Buck Baker, and Petty was declared the winner of the main event. Flock became the first driver to have radio contact with his crew.

1955

The 1955 race was won by Fireball Roberts. He was later disqualified, so the official win went to Tim Flock. Roberts was disqualified after NASCAR's technical director found pushrods that were 0.016 inches (0.41 mm) too long.

Preliminary races were won by Speedy Thompson (100-mile Sportsmen) and Banjo Matthews (125-mile Modified).

1956

Tim Flock won his second consecutive Daytona race from the pole in his 1956 Chrysler C-300. The car was owned by legendary NASCAR car owner Carl Kiekhaefer. He led every lap except for the four after his first pit stop. Charlie Scott became the first African-American to compete in a NASCAR Grand National race, driving another Kiekhaefer-entered Chrysler.

1957

The three-race weekend was revised with new preliminary formats. The first race was a 125-mile (201 km) Modifield/Sportsmen race, and the second was a 160-mile (260 km) Late Model Convertible event. Tim Flock and Curtis Turner were the victors.

In the main event, Cotton Owens moved from his third-place starting position to lead the first lap. Paul Goldsmith took the lead briefly after 40 mi (64 km) (of 160 mi (260 km)). Goldsmith took the lead back from Owens after Owens pitted after 94 mi (151 km). Goldsmith's quick pit stop gave him a lead that he maintained until he went out with a blown piston with 36 mi (58 km) left in the race. Owens led the rest of the way for his first career win. The win was the first NASCAR win for Pontiac, and the first Grand National race speed average over 100 mph (101.541 mph).

1958

Paul Goldsmith started from the pole to win the final event at the course. He drove a Pontiac prepared by Ray Fox. Curtis Turner finished second, Jack Smith was third, and Joe Weatherly was fourth. Lee Petty, Buck Baker, Fireball Roberts, and Cotton Owens finished in the top 10.

On Friday, Banjo Matthews won the Sportsmen/Modified race, while on Saturday, Curtis Turner won the 160-mile (260 km) Convertible race.

=== End of course ===
By 1953, it became increasingly complicated to run the race on the beach course due to the rapid urban growth of the Daytona Beach area. Hotels were being constructed all along the beachfront. France Sr. knew that a permanent racetrack was needed to hold the large crowds that were gathering for races. He looked for alternatives and negotiated with the city of Daytona Beach to purchase a site near the Daytona airport. He arranged financing and in 1957, construction began on the Daytona International Speedway, a 2.5 mi (4.0 km) tri-oval circuit with steep bankings that permitted higher speeds.

The Daytona Beach course hosted its last event in 1958 and, in 1959 the first Daytona 500 was held at the new superspeedway. Daytona Speed Week on the beach course continued through 1961 without using the adjoining public road, with time/distance record attempts held for the standing mile and flying mile in multiple classes. The six fastest stock cars recorded on the beach were 1960 Chrysler 300G Specials.
