= Smokey Yunick =

American sports car mechanic (1923–2001)

- Yunick in 1982
- Born: Henry Yunick; May 25, 1923; Neshaminy Falls, Pennsylvania, U.S.
- Died: May 9, 2001 (aged 77); Daytona Beach, Florida, U.S.
- Awards: 1990 International Motorsports Hall of Fame inductee

NASCAR Cup Series career
- 1 race run over 1 year
- Best finish: 147th (1952)
- First race: 1952 Race 34 (Palm Beach)
Wins	Top tens	Poles
0	0	0
- Military career
- Spouse: Margie Yunick
- Allegiance: United States
- Branch: Army Air Corps
- Service years: 1943–1946
- Rank: 1st LT
- Units: 15th Air Force, 97th Bombardment Group, 341st Bombardment Squadron
- Conflicts: World War II
- Awards: Air Medal
- Statistics up to date as of January 18, 2026.

Henry "Smokey" Yunick (May 25, 1923 – May 9, 2001) was an American professional stock car racing crew chief, owner, driver, engineer, engine builder, and car designer. He also served as a pilot in the United States Army Air Corps in World War II. Yunick was deeply involved in the early years of NASCAR and is probably most associated with that racing genre. He participated in nearly every facet of the sport as a driver, designer, and held other jobs related to the sport, but was best known as a mechanic, engine builder, and crew chief.

Yunick was twice NASCAR mechanic of the year, and his teams would include 50 of the most famous drivers in the sport, winning 57 NASCAR Cup Series races, including two championships in 1951 and 1953.

Yunick was renowned as an opinionated character who "was about as good as there ever was on engines," according to Marvin Panch, who drove stock cars for Yunick and won the 1961 Daytona 500. His trademark white uniform and battered cowboy hat, together with a cigar or corncob pipe, were a familiar sight in the pits of almost every NASCAR or Indianapolis 500 race for over twenty years. During the 1980s, he wrote a technical column, "Track Tech," for Circle Track magazine and wrote an occasional "Say, Smokey..." guest column for Popular Science magazine. In 1990, he was inducted into the International Motorsports Hall of Fame.

== Early life ==
A son of Ukrainian immigrants, Yunick grew up on a farm in Neshaminy Falls, Pennsylvania, and had to drop out of school to run the farm at the age of 16, upon the death of his father. This, however, allowed him to exercise his talents for improvising and optimizing mechanical solutions, for example, constructing a tractor from the remains of a junked car. In his spare time, he built and raced motorcycles; this is where he got his nickname, "Smokey," derived from the behavior of one of his motorcycles.

== Military service ==
As stated in a New York Times article, Yunick claimed that he joined the Army Air Corps in 1941 and piloted a B-17 Flying Fortress named "Smokey and his Firemen" on more than 50 missions over Europe. He was with the 97th Bombardment Group (Heavy) of the 15th Air Force, at Amendola Airfield, Italy. He reported that he was then transferred to the war's Pacific theater following VE Day.

Official military records from the National Archives reflect that Yunick was drafted from civilian life as a welder in January 1943, at the age of 19 in Philadelphia at the enlisted rank of Private. He served on active duty as from February 1944 to March 1946. Subsequently commissioned as a 2nd Lieutenant, he was awarded one award, an Air Medal by the 15th Air Force in 1944. Although he reported that he was wounded in combat, there is no record of a Purple Heart being issued.

In 1946, Yunick moved to Daytona Beach, Florida, because he had flown over it on training missions.

== Smokey's Garage ==
Yunick ran "Smokey's Best Damn Garage in Town" at 957 N Beach St. in Daytona Beach from 1947, when he opened the garage repairing trucks, until 1987, when he closed it, claiming that there were no more good mechanics. The garage property was sold according to his estate plan in 2003. Most of the buildings were taken down a few years later, leaving only a single building that erupted in flames on April 25, 2011, at about 7 p.m. and was destroyed.

== Automobile racing ==
When Yunick's reputation as a good mechanic spread through the town, Marshall Teague, a local stock car race team owner, invited him to join the team, and Yunick accepted, despite being completely unfamiliar with stock car racing. He prepared a Hudson Hornet for driver Herb Thomas for the second running of the Southern 500 in Darlington, South Carolina, which won the race.

Between 1958 and 1973, Yunick also participated in Indianapolis 500 racing, his car winning the 1960 race. His innovations included the "Reverse Torque Special" of 1959, with the engine running in opposite rotation than usual, and the Hurst Floor Shifter Special, a car with the driver's capsule mounted as a "sidecar" in 1964. In 1962, one year after Art Malone set the world closed-circuit record at Daytona in Bob Osiecki's Kurtis-Kraft Indy roadster with two inverted wings, Yunick mounted a single wing on Jim Rathmann's Simoniz Vista Special Watson Roadster. The wing, designed to increase downforce, allowed Rathmann to reach cornering speeds never before seen at the Indianapolis Motor Speedway but created so much drag that it caused the car to record slower lap times. The United States Automobile Club (USAC) immediately banned the use of wings, but they soon began to appear on cars competing in Can-Am and Formula One. By 1972, USAC once again allowed their use. He also participated in drag racing.

Yunick's racing career brought him into contact with representatives of the automotive industry, and he became Chevrolet's unofficial factory race team, as well as heading NASCAR efforts for Ford and Pontiac. Much of the high-performance development of the Chevrolet Small-Block engine involved Yunick in design, testing, or both. Yunick raced Chevrolets in 1955 and 1956, Fords in 1957 and 1958, and Pontiacs from 1959 through 1963. It was with Pontiac that Yunick became the first team owner to win the Daytona 500 twice (1961 and 1962), as well as the first to put a driver, his close friend Fireball Roberts, on the pole three times (1960–1962); this also made Pontiac the first manufacturer to do so.

Following Fireball Roberts' 1964 crash at Charlotte — where after 40 days in pain from burns, he died — Yunick began a campaign for safety modifications to prevent a repeat of such disasters. After being overruled repeatedly by NASCAR's owner, Bill France Sr., Yunick left NASCAR in 1970.

As with most successful racers, Yunick was a master of the grey area straddling the rules. Perhaps his most famous exploit was his No. 13 1966 Chevrolet Chevelle, driven by Curtis Turner. The car was so much faster than the competition during testing that they were sure that cheating was involved; some aerodynamic enhancement was strongly suspected, but the car's profile seemed to be entirely stock, as the rules required. It was eventually discovered that Yunick had lowered and modified the roof and windows and raised the production car's floor (to lower the body). This car has many legends about it, and they were definitively debunked by the 2019 Dinner with Racers episode on Amazon Prime TV. Since then, NASCAR required each race car's roof, hood, and trunk to fit templates representing the production car's exact profile.

Another Yunick improvisation was getting around the regulations specifying a maximum size for the fuel tank by using 11-foot (3 meter) coils of 2-inch (5-centimeter) diameter tubing for the fuel line to add about 5 US gallons (18.9 liters) to the car's fuel capacity. Once, NASCAR officials came up with nine items for Yunick to fix before the car would be allowed on the track. The suspicious NASCAR officials had removed the tank for inspection. Yunick started the car with no gas tank and said, "Better make it ten," and drove it back to the pits. However, the story was not true. It is also claimed that he used a basketball in the fuel tank which could be inflated when the car's fuel capacity was checked and deflated for the race.

Yunick also used such innovations as offset chassis, raised floors, roof spoilers, nitrous oxide injection, and other modifications, often within the letter of the rule book, if not the spirit. "All those other guys were cheatin' 10 times worse than us," Yunick wrote in his autobiography, "so it was just self-defense." Yunick's success was also due to his expertise in the aerodynamics of racing cars.

In another incident, Yunick showed up for a race with stock fender wells still installed on his Chevelle, even though the rules stated they could be removed. After the car qualified well due to improved aerodynamics, fellow competitors complained. Yunick replied, "The rules say you MAY remove them. They don't say you HAVE to." After qualifying, Yunick promptly cut out the fender wells. After further complaints to NASCAR, Smokey said, "The rules don't say WHEN I can remove them."

Yunick also built a 1968 Camaro for Trans-Am racing. Although Yunick set several speed and endurance records with the car at Bonneville Speedway, with both a 302 cubic inch (~4942 cubic centimeters) and a 396 cubic inch (~6489 cubic centimeter) engine, it never won a race while Yunick owned it. It was later sold to Don Yenko, who did win several races. In typical Yunick fashion, the car, although superficially a stock Camaro, had acid-dipped body panels and thinner window glass to reduce weight, the front end of the body tilted downwards and the windshield laid back for aerodynamics, all four fenders widened, the front subframe Z'ed (to physically move the front suspension higher and lower the front of the car) and the floorpan moved up to lower the car, and many other detailed modifications. The drip rails were brought closer to the body for a tiny aerodynamic improvement. A connector to the engine oil system was extended into the car's interior to allow the driver to add oil from a pressurized hose during pit stops. The shoulder harness was modified to include a cable-ratchet mechanism from a military helicopter to give the driver enough freedom of movement. In 1993, Vic Edelbrock Jr. purchased and restored the car.

Contrary to popular opinion, Yunick designed the first "safe wall" racetrack barrier in the early 1980s using old tires between sheets of plywood, but NASCAR did not adopt his idea. Also, Yunick developed air jacks for stock cars in 1961, but NASCAR did not deem them appropriate.

== Awards ==
Yunick was inducted into the International Motorsports Hall of Fame in 1990 (inaugural year) and the Motorsports Hall of Fame of America In 2000. Yunick is a member of over 30 Halls of Fame across the United States and the rest of the world. Some of his items, including hats, pipes, boots, engines, etc., are on display (loaned from family, most of them) at museums, from racetracks to the Smithsonian (history of racing).

Yunick was the NASCAR Mechanic of the Year twice.

=== Patents ===
Yunick is the inventor of at least nine US patents.

Patent Number	Filed	Title
4,068,635	January 17, 1978	Pressure vent
4,467,752	August 28, 1984	Internal combustion engine
4,503,833	March 12, 1985	Apparatus and operating method for an internal combustion engine
4,592,329	June 21, 1984	Apparatus and operating method for an internal combustion engine
4,637,365	October 22, 1984	Fuel conditioning apparatus and method
4,862,859	March 2, 1988	Apparatus and operating method for an internal combustion engine
5,246,086	March 15, 1991	Oil change system and method
5,515,712	June 17, 1994	Apparatus and method for testing combustion engines
5,645,368	May 29, 1996	Race track with novel crash barrier and method

== Author ==
Yunick's column "Say, Smokey" was a staple of Popular Science magazine in the 1960s and 1970s; it consisted of his responses to letters sent to him by readers regarding mechanical conditions affecting their cars and technical questions about how automotive performance could be improved and also about particularly tricky automotive issues. He also wrote for Circle Track magazine and published his autobiography Best Damn Garage in Town...The World According to Smokey in July 2001. The audiobook version, Sex Lies and Superspeedways: Volume 1, was narrated by a longtime friend John DeLorean.

In 1984, Yunick published Smokey's Power Secrets (ISBN 0931472067).

== Legacy ==
After Yunick's death, his shop's contents were auctioned off, according to his wishes. He had witnessed his friend Don Garlits' difficulties developing and maintaining a museum. He did not want either his family to be saddled with such a burden or a "high roller" to gain control of his reputation. Instead, he preferred that his tools, equipment, cars, engines, and parts go to people who would use them, and before his death, he undertook to restore as much of it as possible to working conditions. The auction proceeds went to a foundation to fund innovations in motorsports.

A marker to honor Yunick was erected alongside Smokey Yunick Way, located in Holly Hill's Riverside Park alongside the former "best damn garage" property.

== Motorsports career results ==
=== NASCAR ===
(key) (Bold – Pole position awarded by qualifying time. Italics – Pole position earned by points standings or practice time. * – Most laps led.)

==== Grand National Series ====
NASCAR Grand National Series results
Year	Team	No.	Make	1	2	3	4	5	6	7	8	9	10	11	12	13	14	15	16	17	18	19	20	21	22	23	24	25	26	27	28	29	30	31	32	33	34	NGNC	Pts	Ref
1952	Thomas Racing	9	Hudson	PAB	DAB	JAC	NWS	MAR	CLB	ATL	MGR	LAN	DAR	DAY	CAN	HAY	FOM	OCC	CLT	MSF	NIF	OSW	MON	MOR	SOB	MCF	ASW	DAR	MGR	LAN	DAY	WIL	OCC	MAR	NWS	ATL	PAB; 18	147th	-	
