= Leon Sales =

American stock car racing driver

- Born: October 4, 1923; Winston-Salem, North Carolina, U.S.
- Died: April 27, 1981 (aged 57) rural Forsyth County, North Carolina, U.S.

NASCAR Cup Series career
- 8 races run over 3 years
- Best finish: 28th (1950)
- First race: 1950 Wilkes 200 (North Wilkesboro)
- Last race: 1953 Race 2 (Daytona Beach)
- First win: 1950 Wilkes 200 (North Wilkesboro)
Wins	Top tens	Poles
1	3	0

Leon Sales (October 4, 1923 – April 27, 1981) was an American stock car racing driver. Sales competed in eight NASCAR Grand National races from 1950 to 1952. He achieved three top-tens and one win, which came at North Wilkesboro Speedway in 1950. Sales died on April 27, 1981.

== Motorsports career results ==
=== NASCAR ===
(key) (Bold – Pole position awarded by qualifying time. Italics – Pole position earned by points standings or practice time. * – Most laps led.)

==== Grand National Series ====
NASCAR Grand National Series results
Year	Team	No.	Make	1	2	3	4	5	6	7	8	9	10	11	12	13	14	15	16	17	18	19	20	21	22	23	24	25	26	27	28	29	30	31	32	33	34	35	36	37	38	39	40	41	NGNC	Pts	Ref
1950	Hubert Westmoreland	98	Plymouth	DAB	CLT	LAN	MAR	CAN	VER	DSP	MCF	CLT	HBO	DSP	HAM	DAR	LAN	NWS; 1	VER	MAR; 21	WIN	HBO																							28th	200	
1951	Hubert Westmoreland	46	Olds	DAB	CLT	NMO	GAR	HBO	ASF	NWS	MAR	CAN	CLS	CLB	DSP	GAR	GRS	BAI	HEI	AWS	MCF	ALS	MSF	FMS	MOR	ABS	DAR; 7	CLB	CCS	LAN	CLT	DSP	WIL												NA	-	
1951			Nash																															HBO; 17	TPN	PGS									NA	-	
1951	Hubert Westmoreland	98	Plymouth																																		MAR; 8	OAK	NWS; 11	HMS	JSP	ATL	GAR	NMO	NA	-	
1952	R. G. Shelton	22	Hudson	PBS; 26	DAB; 57	JSP	NWS	MAR	CLB	ATL	CCS	LAN	DAR	DSP	CAN	HAY	FMS	HBO	CLT	MSF	NIF	OSW	MON	MOR	PPS	MCF	AWS	DAR	CCS	LAN	DSP	WIL	HBO	MAR	NWS	ATL	PBS								188th	-	
