= Chuck Mahoney =

American racing driver

- Born: Charles F. Mahoney; March 23, 1920; Stockholm, New York, U.S.
- Died: July 20, 1999 (aged 79); Williamsville, New York, U.S.
- Cause of death: Heart attack

NASCAR Cup Series career
- 16 races run over 4 years
- Best finish: 7th (1950)
- First race: 1949 (Hamburg)
- Last race: 1956 (Asheville-Weaverville)
Wins	Top tens	Poles
0	7	1

NASCAR Sportsman Division
- First Race: 1950 (Eastern States)
- First Win: June 15, 1950 (Sandy Creek)

Charles F. Mahoney (March 23, 1920 – July 20, 1999) was an American stock car racing driver.

== Racing career ==
One of the pioneers of the Grand National Series, he competed in 16 races over the first eight years of the sport, with a best finish of second at the Charlotte Speedway in 1950. Mahoney finished 5th in NASCAR's inaugural superspeedway race, the 1950 Southern 500, and ultimately finished seventh in the driver standings for that year.

Mahoney won his first race in the NASCAR NASCAR Sportsman Division (predecessor of the O'Reilly Auto Parts Series) at Sandy Creek on June 15, 1950, and spent the majority of his career racing in the Sportsman and Modified classes at the renowned tracks of the northeast, including Fonda Speedway, Langhorne Speedway, Oswego Speedway, Spencer Speedway, Utica-Rome Speedway, and Watertown Speedway.

Mahoney, who introduced stock car racing on ice on Oneida Lake in central New York, also promoted racing at two tracks in upstate New York after he retired from driving. He died in 1999 of a heart attack.

== Motorsports career results ==
=== NASCAR ===
(key) (Bold – Pole position awarded by qualifying time. Italics – Pole position earned by points standings or practice time. * – Most laps led.)

==== Grand National Series ====
NASCAR Grand National Series results
Year	Team	No.	Make	1	2	3	4	5	6	7	8	9	10	11	12	13	14	15	16	17	18	19	20	21	22	23	24	25	26	27	28	29	30	31	32	33	34	35	36	37	38	39	40	41	42	43	44	45	46	47	48	49	50	51	52	53	54	55	56	NGNC	Pts	Ref
1949	Brooks Motors	77	Mercury	CLT	DAB	HBO	LAN	HAM; 16	MAR	HEI	NWS																																																	71st	2.5	
1950	Brooks Motors	18	Mercury	DAB	CLT	LAN	MAR	CAN; 15																																																				7th	1217.5	
1950	Brooks Motors	77	Mercury						**VER**; 3	DSP; 9	MCF; 17	CLT; 2	HBO; 9	DSP; 27	HAM; 16	DAR; 5	LAN; 31	NWS	VER; 9	MAR	WIN	HBO																																						7th	1217.5	
1951		77	Henry J	DAB	CLT	NMO	GAR	HBO	ASF	NWS	MAR	CAN	CLS	CLB	DSP	GAR	GRS	BAI	HEI	AWS	MCF	ALS	MSF	FMS	MOR; 9	ABS	DAR	CLB	CCS	LAN	CLT	DSP	WIL	HBO	TPN	PGS	MAR	OAK	NWS	HMS	JSP	ATL	GAR	NMO																		
1952	Ken Swihart	77	Hudson	PBS; 25	DAB	JSP	NWS	MAR	CLB	ATL	CCS	LAN	DAR	DSP	CAN	HAY	FMS	HBO	CLT	MSF	NIF	OSW	MON	MOR	PPS	MCF	AWS	DAR	CCS	LAN	DSP	WIL	HBO	MAR	NWS	ATL	PBS																									
1956	Billy Rafter	40	Dodge	HCY	CLT	WSS	PBS	ASF	DAB	PBS	WIL	ATL	NWS	LAN	RCH	CLB	CON	GPS	HCY	HBO	MAR	LIN	CLT	POR	EUR	NYF	MER	MAS	CLT	MCF; 17	POR	AWS; 16	RSP	PIF	CSF	CHI	CCF	MGY	OKL	ROA	OBS	SAN	NOR	PIF	MYB	POR	DAR	CSH	CLT	LAN	POR	CLB	HBO	NWP	CLT	CCF	MAR	HCY	WIL			
