= Harold Kite =

American racing driver (1921–1965)

- Born: November 13, 1921; East Point, Georgia, U.S.
- Died: October 17, 1965 (aged 43); Concord, North Carolina, U.S.
- Cause of death: Injuries from racing accident

NASCAR Cup Series career
- 9 races run over 5 years
- Best finish: 25th (1951)
- First race: 1950 untitled race (Daytona Beach)
- Last race: 1965 National 400 (Charlotte)
- First win: 1950 untitled race (Daytona Beach)
Wins	Top tens	Poles
1	2	0

Harold Edwin Kite (November 13, 1921 – October 17, 1965) was a NASCAR Grand National Series driver from East Point, Georgia. In his brief Grand National Series career, Kite competed in nine events to earn one win and two top-ten finishes.

== Early life ==
Kite attended Commercial High School in Atlanta, graduating in 1939. He joined the U.S. Army in June 1942, achieving the rank of first lieutenant the following January. Kite served with the 1st Armored Division and was wounded in January 1944 during the Anzio landings. He continued to serve in the Georgia National Guard while driving for NASCAR, and was a captain commanding the 201st Ordnance Medium Maintenance Company when he won at Daytona Beach.

== Career summary ==
Kite's debut came in 1950. Starting third on the Daytona Beach Road Course, he quickly found his way to the lead. From there, Kite led 38 of the 48 laps, holding off Red Byron by fifty-three seconds for the victory. He recorded two midpack finishes to close out the year: a 38th in the inaugural event at Darlington and a 12th place in a small field at North Wilkesboro Speedway.

Kite's next two races would take place during the 1951 season when he finished a career-high 25th in points. He started 38th in the history-breaking eighty-two car field at the Southern 500, completed most of the laps, and kept in shouting distance of the leaders to finish sixth. Kite did not keep early-season momentum on his side, finishing his other start that year with a last (29th) place showing at Columbia Speedway.

Kite tacked on two more starts a few years later, making his return during the 1955 season. Piston issues very early in the LeHi race held at Memphis-Arkansas Speedway left him 25th, and various woes kept him to 43rd place in the Darlington Southern 500.

Kite made a new approach during his solo 1956 appearance, making his start at the tiny Shelby track located at the Cleveland County Fairgrounds. But even the small field of 17 could not be conquered by Kite, who fell several laps down and finished 11th.

Kite waited until 1965 to return to the sport, competing for the first time at the speedy Charlotte Motor Speedway. It would be a tragic return for the former Army captain: Just one lap into the National 400, Kite was involved in a five-car pileup on the fourth turn. As Kite's vehicle got involved with Rock Harn, Sonny Hutchins, and Frank Warren, he slid down the embankment and was rammed broadside square in the drivers side door by Jimmy Helms. Kite, 43, was pronounced dead on arrival at the infield hospital.

Kite was inducted into the Georgia Racing Hall of Fame in 2011.

== Motorsports career results ==
=== NASCAR ===
(key) (Bold – Pole position awarded by qualifying time. Italics – Pole position earned by points standings or practice time. * – Most laps led.)

==== Grand National Series ====
NASCAR Grand National Series results
Year	Team	No.	Make	1	2	3	4	5	6	7	8	9	10	11	12	13	14	15	16	17	18	19	20	21	22	23	24	25	26	27	28	29	30	31	32	33	34	35	36	37	38	39	40	41	42	43	44	45	46	47	48	49	50	51	52	53	54	55	56	NGNC	Pts	Ref
1950	Harold Kite	21	Lincoln	DAB; 1*	CLT	LAN	MAR	CAN	VER	DSP	MCF	CLT	HBO	DSP	HAM	DAR; 38	LAN																																											30th	187	
1950	Harold Kite	21	Mercury															NWS; 12	VER	MAR	WIN	HBO																																						30th	187	
1951	Julian Buesink	1	Olds	DAB	CLT	NMO	GAR	HBO	ASF	NWS	MAR	CAN	CLS	CLB	DSP	GAR	GRS	BAI	HEI	AWS	MCF	ALS	MSF	FMS	MOR	ABS	DAR; 6	CLB; 29	CCS	LAN	CLT	DSP	WIL	HBO	TPN	PGS	MAR	OAK	NWS	HMS	JSP	ATL	GAR	NMO																25th	625	
1955	The Racing Club	71	Olds	TCS	PBS	JSP	DAB	OSP	CLB	HBO	NWS	MGY	LAN	CLT	HCY	ASF	TUS	MAR	RCH	NCF	FOR	LIN	MCF	FON	AIR	CLT	PIF	CLB	AWS	MOR	ALS	NYF	SAN	CLT	FOR	MAS; 25	RSP	DAR; 43	MGY	LAN	RSP	GPS	MAS	CLB	MAR	LVP	NWS	HBO												181st	-	
1956		66	Ford	HCY	CLT	WSS	PBS	ASF	DAB	PBS	WIL	ATL	NWS	LAN	RCH	CLB	CON	GPS	HCY	HBO	MAR	LIN	CLT	POR	EUR	NYF	MER	MAS	CLT	MCF	POR	AWS	RSP	PIF	CSF	CHI	CCF; 11	MGY	OKL	ROA	OBS	SAN	NOR	PIF	MYB	POR	DAR	CSH	CLT	LAN	POR	CLB	HBO	NWP	CLT	CCF	MAR	HCY	WIL	28th	1724	
1965	Rex Racing Associates	01	Plymouth	RSD	DAY	DAY	DAY	PIF	AWS	RCH	HBO	ATL	GPS	NWS	MAR	CLB	BRI	DAR	LGY	BGS	HCY	CLT	CCF	ASH	HAR	NSV	BIR	ATL	GPS	MBS	VAL	DAY	ODS	OBS	ISP	GLN	BRI	NSV	CCF	AWS	SMR	PIF	AUG	CLB	DTS	BLV	BGS	DAR	HCY	LIN	ODS	RCH	MAR	NWS	CLT; 42	HBO	CAR	DTS		133rd	88	
