= Bill Rexford =

American racing driver (1927–1994)

- Born: March 14, 1927; Conewango Valley, New York, U.S.
- Died: April 18, 1994 (aged 67); Hemet, California, U.S.
- Achievements: 1950 Grand National Champion

NASCAR Cup Series career
- 36 races run over 5 years
- Best finish: 1st (1950)
- First race: 1949 (Langhorne)
- Last race: 1953 (Rochester)
- First win: 1950 (Canfield)
Wins	Top tens	Poles
1	17	1

William James Rexford (March 14, 1927 – April 18, 1994) was an American stock car driver in the early 1950s. He is best remembered for winning the 1950 NASCAR Grand National Series championship at only 23 years old. Rexford currently holds the distinction as NASCAR's youngest Cup Champion, and the only eligible Cup Series champion to not be inducted into the NASCAR Hall of Fame.

== Biography ==
Born in Conewango Valley, New York to Kermit and Edith Rexford, Rexford made his name driving stock cars in Western New York. He got his introduction at a young age as his father owned a Chevrolet dealership in the village. At age 16, he made his racing debut at a nearby track in Leon, New York. After he turned 18, he stopped his racing career to join the United States Navy during World War II, during that time, he was stationed in Newport, Rhode Island. After his discharge, he went back home to New York and started racing at bullrings in Buffalo, Rochester, and everywhere in between. When NASCAR introduced its "Strictly Stock" series in 1949, Rexford made three starts, with his best finish being a third at Heidelberg Raceway. He went into full-time competition in the newly renamed Grand National Series in 1950. He and teammate Lloyd Moore became the first Northern-born drivers to go full time on the circuit. He competed in 17 of the 19 races that season, driving Oldsmobiles, Fords, and Mercuries owned by nearby Jamestown, New York resident Julian Buesink. He scored his first and only win in the fifth race of the year at Canfield Speedway.

Rexford was consistent and battled for the points lead for most of the year. His two biggest competitors were legends Curtis Turner and then-rookie Fireball Roberts. A third contender, Lee Petty, had been stripped of 809 points earlier in the season for competing in non-NASCAR sanctioned races and was essentially robbed of a realistic shot at the title. Late in the year, Rexford was able to take the points lead as both Roberts and Turner suffered from inconsistency.

In the final race of the year at Occoneechee Speedway, Rexford was locked in a tight battle with Fireball for the championship, holding the points lead by a slim margin. Rexford's engine expired early, and his championship hopes nearly went up in smoke. All Roberts needed to do now was finish in the top five, but trademark desire to win led him to push his car and his engine gave out with less than 50 laps to go, giving Rexford a dramatic, and controversial championship.

1950 proved to be Rexford's lone full-time campaign in NASCAR's highest division. He moved back to the Northeast and remained a part-time competitor in the Grand National ranks until 1953, when he ran his last race in Rochester, New York. He finished fifth, driving the No. 60 Chevrolet for long-time car owner Julian Buesink. After 1953, Rexford joined the Midwest Association for Race Car (MERC) in 1954 (now known as ARCA). As a result, Bill France banned Rexford from racing and fined him $1,000 in the process, which Rexford refused to do. He raced until 1956 when he retired from racing at the age of 29. After he moved to Arizona and started a trucking company for 25 years. After that, he sold the company and retired to California where he died after a long illness.

75 years after his lone Cup championship, Rexford is still the youngest driver to win a championship in what has become the NASCAR Cup Series, doing so at age 23. He remained the only driver from the Northeast to win a championship until 2017 when New Jersey’s Martin Truex Jr. won, and was the only non-Southerner to win a title until 1989 when Missouri's Rusty Wallace won, a feat which has been matched many times since. Rexford was the only series champion that was not included among NASCAR's 50 Greatest Drivers in 1998 and is the only champion from 1949 to 2011 not to be inducted into the NASCAR Hall of Fame, as well as the only Cup Series champion who is eligible not to be inducted into the Hall of Fame. He is the only Cup champion to have just one career win and the first of four drivers to win the title with just one win on the season, being followed by Ned Jarrett in 1961, Benny Parsons in 1973, and Matt Kenseth in 2003.

== Motorsports career results ==
=== NASCAR ===
(key) (Bold – Pole position awarded by qualifying time. Italics – Pole position earned by points standings or practice time. * – Most laps led.)

==== Grand National Series ====
NASCAR Grand National Series results
Year	Team	No.	Make	1	2	3	4	5	6	7	8	9	10	11	12	13	14	15	16	17	18	19	20	21	22	23	24	25	26	27	28	29	30	31	32	33	34	35	36	37	38	39	40	41	NGNC	Pts	Ref
1949	Julian Buesink	59	Ford	CLT	DAB	HBO	LAN; 14	HAM; 5	MAR																																				12th	286	
1949	Julian Buesink	4	Ford							HEI; 3	NWS																																		12th	286	
1950	Julian Buesink	60	Oldsmobile	DAB; 29		LAN; 22	MAR; 9	CAN; 1	VER; 6								LAN; 8	NWS	VER; 6	MAR																									1st	1959	
1950	Julian Buesink	20	Oldsmobile		CLT; 13																																								1st	1959	
1950	Julian Buesink	8	Oldsmobile							DSP; 10																																			1st	1959	
1950	Julian Buesink	80	Oldsmobile								MCF; 5	CLT; 19	HBO; 4	DSP; 14	HAM; 6																														1st	1959	
1950	Julian Buesink	59	Oldsmobile													DAR; 4																													1st	1959	
1950	Julian Buesink	61	Ford																		WIN; 3																								1st	1959	
1950	Julian Buesink	62	Oldsmobile																			HBO; 26																							1st	1959	
1951	Julian Buesink	61	Oldsmobile	DAB; 13																																									72nd	130	
1951	Julian Buesink	8	Mercury		CLT; 21																																								72nd	130	
1951	Perry Smith	23	Studebaker			NMO; 13	GAR																																						72nd	130	
1951	Julian Buesink	60	Mercury					HBO; 19	ASF																																				72nd	130	
1951	Julian Buesink	50	Mercury							NWS; 14																																			72nd	130	
1951	Julian Buesink	5	Mercury								MAR; 16																																		72nd	130	
1951	Julian Buesink	60	Oldsmobile									**CAN**; 21	CLS	CLB	DSP	GAR	GRS	BAI	HEI	AWS	MCF; 6	ALS	MSF	FMS																					72nd	130	
1951	Julian Buesink	1	Oldsmobile																						MOR; 22	ABS																			72nd	130	
1951	George Hartley	52	Oldsmobile																								DAR; 71	CLB	CCS	LAN	CLT	DSP	WIL	HBO	TPN	PGS; 14	MAR	OAK	NWS	HMS	JSP	ATL	GAR	NMO	72nd	130	
1952	Julian Buesink	60	Ford	PBS	DAB	JSP	NWS	MAR	CLB	ATL	CCS	LAN	DAR	DSP	CAN; 8	HAY	FMS; 16	HBO	CLT																										NA	0	
1952	Jim B. Copperheat	174	Nash																	MSF; 36	NIF	OSW	MON	MOR	PPS	MCF	AWS	DAR	CCS	LAN	DSP	WIL	HBO	MAR	NWS	ATL	PBS								NA	0	
1953	Julian Buesink	60	Chevrolet	PBS	DAB	HAR	NWS	CLT	RCH	CCS	LAN	CLB	HCY	MAR	PMS	RSP	LOU	FIF	LAN; 10	TCS	WIL	MCF; 5	PIF	MOR	ATL	RVS	LCF	DAV	HBO	AWS	PAS	HCY	DAR	CCS	LAN	BLF	WIL	NWS	MAR	ATL					NA	0	

Preceded by Red Byron	NASCAR Grand National Series Champion; 1950	Succeeded by Herb Thomas
