= Jimmy Florian =

American racing driver (1923–1999)

- Born: September 25, 1923; Cleveland, Ohio, U.S.
- Died: February 14, 1999 (aged 75)
- Cause of death: Cancer

NASCAR Cup Series career
- 26 races run over 4 years
- Best finish: 9th (1950)
- First race: 1950 Race 3 (Langhorne)
- Last race: 1954 Race 2 (Daytona Beach)
- First win: 1950 Race 7 (Dayton)
Wins	Top tens	Poles
1	13	1

Jimmy Florian (September 25, 1923 – February 14, 1999) was an American stock car racing driver. Nicknamed "Shirtless", he attained the moniker after winning his first and only NASCAR Grand National Series race in 1950 at Dayton Speedway; upon entering Victory Lane, he exited the car without wearing a shirt. The victory was also the first for Ford Motor Company in NASCAR's top series.

== Racing career ==
Florian started racing quarter midgets and sprint cars around his hometown of Cleveland. At one track, Florian won 71 of 75 feature races.

In 1950, Florian started competing in the NASCAR Grand National Series, driving a 1950 Ford that was formerly owned by the Detroit chief of police. His friend, truck driver Bill Whitley, co-owned the car and drove some races in the Ford, a Hudson Hornet and an Oldsmobile. In addition to driving, Florian served as a mechanic. He made his debut at Langhorne Speedway and finished third. Two races later, he won the pole position at Canfield Speedway (he finished sixth). At Dayton Speedway, Florian passed the dominant car of Curtis Turner (who led 115 of 200 laps) with 35 laps remaining to win the first NASCAR Grand National Series race for Ford Motor Company. Incredulous with the result (especially as Florian's flathead engine Ford was able to defeat the overhead valve engines of the successful Oldsmobiles), drivers like Turner, Joe Weatherly and Lee Petty protested the finish. During a post-race inspection, NASCAR went as far as to contact the Ford Motor Company to ensure Florian's engine was not oversized, though the company responded that the car was legal. In Victory Lane, Florian exited the car shirtless; Whitley stated the heat that day, the discomfort of the car's seat, the lack of a seatbelt (which were not required by NASCAR at the time) and the amount of protection a stock car offered contributed to Florian's decision to take off his shirt. NASCAR eventually created a rule prohibiting drivers from removing their shirts.

Florian ended the 1950 season with a ninth-place finish in the championship. Florian continued to race in NASCAR in 1951 (including three races for Don Rogala), 1952 and 1954; though he did not win another race, he recorded seven top-ten finishes and two top-fives.

After his NASCAR career ended, Florian continued short track racing, competing in vintage cars until he was 72. He died in February 1999 at the age of 75 after a battle with cancer.

== Motorsports career results ==
=== NASCAR ===
(key) (Bold – Pole position awarded by qualifying time. Italics – Pole position earned by points standings or practice time. * – Most laps led.)

==== Grand National Series ====
NASCAR Grand National Series results
Year	Team	No.	Make	1	2	3	4	5	6	7	8	9	10	11	12	13	14	15	16	17	18	19	20	21	22	23	24	25	26	27	28	29	30	31	32	33	34	35	36	37	38	39	40	41	NGNC	Pts
1950	Jimmy Florian	27	Ford	DAB	CLT	LAN; 3	MAR	**CAN**; 6	VER; 8	DAY; 1	MCF; 4	CLT	HBO; 19	DAY; 22	HAM; 26	DAR; 41	LAN	NWS	VER	MAR	WIN; 7	HBO																							9th	801
1951	Don Rogala		Olds	DAB	CLT	NMO	GAR	HBO	ASF	NWS	MAR	CAN; 30	CLS	CLB																		DAY; 7	WIL	HBO	TPN	PGS; 4	MAR	OAK	NWS	HMS					27th	462.5
1951	Jimmy Florian	27	Ford												DAY; 20	GAR	GRS; 8	BAI; 4	HEI	AWS	MCF	ALS	MSF	FMS; 9	MOR	ABS	DAR	CLB	CCS	LAN	CLT										JSP; 22	ATL; 17	GAR	NMO	27th	462.5
1952	Jimmy Florian	18	Olds	PBS; 21	DAB; 42																																								48th	551
1952	Jimmy Florian	18	Ford			JSP; 12	NWS	MAR	CLB; 10	ATL; 10	CCS; 13	LAN	DAR	DAY	CAN	HAY	FMS	HBO	CLT	MSF	NIF	OSW	MON	MOR	PPS	MCF	AWS	DAR	CCS	LAN	DAY	WIL	HBO	MAR	NWS	ATL	PBS								48th	551
1954	Jimmy Florian	15	Hudson	PBS	DAB; 37	JSP	ATL	OSP	OAK	NWS	HBO	CCS	LAN	WIL	MAR	SHA	RSP	CLT	GAR	CLB	LIN	HCY	MCF	WGS	PIF	AWS	SFS	GRS	MOR	OAK	CLT	SAN	COR	DAR	CCS	CLT	LAN	MAS	MAR	NWS					NA	–
