= 1950 NASCAR Grand National Series =

American motorsport season

Champions
- Champion: Bill Rexford

Seasons
- ← 1949 1951 →

The 1950 NASCAR Grand National season was the second season of professional stock car racing in the United States. Beginning at the Daytona Beach Road Course on February 5, 1950, the season included 19 races. The season concluded at Occoneechee Speedway on October 29. Bill Rexford won the Drivers' Championship with a 26th-place finish at the final race of the season, racing for Julian Buesink.

== Schedule ==
19 different races were held at 14 different circuits, in 8 different states. The Southern 500 had the largest purse and therefore awarded the highest points, whilst race 1950–04, at the Martinsville Speedway, had the smallest purse.

| No. | Date | Race title | Track | Miles | Purse |
|---|---|---|---|---|---|
| 1 | February 5 | 1950–01 | (Florida) Daytona Beach Road Course, Daytona Beach | 200 | $6200 |
| 2 | April 2 | 1950–02 | (North Carolina) Charlotte Speedway, Charlotte | 150 | $4125 |
| 3 | April 16 | 1950–03 | (Pennsylvania) Langhorne Speedway, Middletown | 150 | $5500 |
| 4 | May 21 | 1950–04 | (Virginia) Martinsville Speedway, Ridgeway | 75 | $3625 |
| 5 | May 30 | Poor Man's 500 | (Ohio) Canfield Speedway, Canfield | 100 | $4350 |
| 6 | June 18 | 1950–06 | (New York (state)) Vernon Fairgrounds, Vernon | 100 | $3850 |
| 7 | June 25 | 1950–07 | (Ohio) Dayton Speedway, Dayton | 100 | $3850 |
| 8 | July 2 | 1950–08 | (New York (state)) Monroe County Fairgrounds, Rochester | 100 | $3850 |
| 9 | July 23 | 1950–09 | (North Carolina) Charlotte Speedway, Charlotte | 150 | $4350 |
| 10 | August 13 | 1950–10 | (North Carolina) Occoneechee Speedway, Hillsboro | 100 | $3975 |
| 11 | August 20 | 1950–11 | (Ohio) Dayton Speedway, Dayton | 98 | $3850 |
| 12 | August 27 | 1950–12 | (New York (state)) Hamburg Speedway, Hamburg | 100 | $4350 |
| 13 | September 4 | Southern 500 | (South Carolina) Darlington Raceway, Darlington | 500 | $25325 |
| 14 | September 17 | 1950–14 | (Pennsylvania) Langhorne Speedway, Langhorne | 200 | $5450 |
| 15 | September 24 | Wilkes 200 | (North Carolina) North Wilkesboro Speedway, North Wilkesboro | 125 (Note: The name "Wilkes 200" refers to the number of laps, not the length.) | $3900 |
| 16 | October 1 | 1950–16 | (New York (state)) Vernon Fairgrounds, Vernon | 100 | $3850 |
| 17 | October 15 | 1950–17 | (Virginia) Martinsville Speedway, Ridgeway | 100 | $3850 |
| 18 | October 15 | 1950–18 | (Indiana) Funk's Speedway, Winchester | 100 | $3750 |
| 19 | October 29 | 1950–19 | (North Carolina) Occoneechee Speedway, Hillsboro | 175 | $4675 |

== Race summaries ==
=== 1950-01 ===
The first race of the 1950 season was run on February 5 at the Daytona Beach Road Course in Daytona Beach, Florida. Joe Littlejohn won the pole. Harold Kite of East Point, Georgia, a former tank driver who began racing on the short tracks after World War II, drove past Red Byron in the 25th lap and went on to score a victory in the 200-mile Grand National opener of the 1950 season. Kite, competing in his first Grand National event, pushed his Lincoln around the sandy course at a record 89.894 mph and beat runner-up Byron to the finish line by 53 seconds. Third place went to Lloyd Moore, Al Gross was fourth, and J. C. Van Landingham, ending a lengthy absence, finished fifth. A crowd estimated at 9,500 watched Kite take the lead at the outset from pole sitter Littlejohn. Kite, a captain in the national guard, held the top spot until Byron passed him on the 15th lap. The defending NASCAR champion relinquished the lead to Kite in the 24th lap when he made a pit stop. Several laps later Byron was forced to make another pit stop to repair gear shift problems. He returned to the race running seventh. Kite went uncontested for the second half of the 48-lap affair on the 4.167-mile course, and Byron provided plenty of action as he worked his way up through the pack. He edged out Moore for second place with a final lap pass. Forty-one cars started the event and 21 were still running at the finish despite the fact that conditions on the beach were less than ideal. Flock turned in one of the most spirited efforts on the cloudy, breezy day. He finished seventh despite the fact that his car's left front wheel wobbled around every turn

Top-ten results

1. 21- Harold Kite
2. 22- Red Byron
3. 59- Lloyd Moore
4. 88- Al Gross
5. 35- J. C. Van Landingham
6. 90- Tim Flock
7. 7- Bob Flock
8. 4- Otis Martin
9. 70- Buck Baker
10. 47- Fonty Flock

=== 1950-02 ===
The second race of the 1950 season was run on April 2 at Charlotte Speedway in Charlotte, North Carolina. Red Byron won the pole. Tim Flock, wheeling the same Lincoln that carried Harold Kite to victory at Daytona, drove around Byron in the 48th lap and stormed to victory in the 150-mile Grand National race. It was Flock's first win on the NASCAR major league tour. Bob Flock finished second, a half lap behind his younger brother. Clyde Minter wound up third, Byron came in fourth and Bill Snowden was fifth. Byron's fourth-place effort, coupled with his runner-up finish at Daytona, enabled him to move to the top of the Grand National points standings, 2.5 points ahead of Tim Flock. A crowd of 13,000 was on hand to watch Bob Flock lead the opening laps in his Oldsmobile. Pole sitter Byron then charged past and led for 42 laps on the three-quarter mile dirt track. Tim surged past Byron in the 48th lap and led the rest of the way. Lash LaRue, Western movie star, greeted Flock in victory lane. "This is my biggest win", said Flock. "To win a Grand National race is a dream come true." June Cleveland was running in the top five when he flipped his Buick in the 85th lap. The roof was flattened, and Cleveland was transported to a Charlotte hospital with cuts. He was not seriously injured. His crash occurred in the exact spot where Virginia driver Jesse Elmo "Hank" Stanley was killed a few weeks earlier in a modified sportsman race. Curtis Turner, Lee Petty, Buck Baker, Fonty Flock and Bill Blair—all rated as pre-race threats—failed to finish the 200-lap race.

Top-ten results

1. 21- Tim Flock
2. 7- Bob Flock
3. 19- Clyde Minter
4. 22- Red Byron
5. ??‐ Bill Snowden
6. 49- Glenn Dunaway
7. ??‐ Jack White
8. 10- Fred Johnson
9. 92- Herb Thomas
10. Huey Dunn

=== 1950-03 ===
The third race of the 1950 season was run on April 16 at Langhorne Speedway in Langhorne, Pennsylvania. Tim Flock won the pole.-- Curtis Turner prevailed in an intense struggle and won the 150-mile race on the one-mile dirt track. His second career Grand National win came at an average speed of 69.399 mph. The lead changed hands seven times as five drivers waged a furious duel. Tim Flock led the opening two laps from the pole position. Bill Blair pushed his Cadillac past Flock in the third lap and led until Flock assumed command again on lap eight. Flock led for 35 laps while 23-year-old rookie Bill Rexford moved into second. The two toured the circular oval in bumper-to-bumper fashion. Rexford sneaked past Flock in the 43rd lap and paced the action for 18 laps. Rexford's Oldsmobile began sputtering, which allowed Turner to take the lead on lap 61. Ray Erickson moved into the lead when he raced his Mercury past Turner in the 84th lap. He was bidding for his first Grand National triumph when a rock pierced his radiator, forcing him out after 114 laps. Turner took the lead at that point and led the rest of the way. Lloyd Moore, Jimmy Florian, Tim Flock and Lee Petty rounded out the top five. Flock was running third when a wheel came off his Lincoln and bounced into the path of Blair, who struck it. The steering column in Blair's Cadillac snapped, came up through the driver's compartment and hit the driver. The High Point, North Carolina, star spent one night in the hospital. Turner won $1,500 for his efforts as only six cars finished after 28 started. Points leader Red Byron did not enter the race. Tim Flock took over the points lead on the strength of his fourth-place finish. Turner's John Eanes-owned Oldsmobile was running on Dunlop tires. Dunlop had plenty of space on Turner's car — placing its name on the hood and side doors. Erickson's appearance was his last start of the year. A short time later, he lost an arm in a hot-rod crash. Also following the race, the FBI began investigating some individuals who were trying to introduce racketeering and gambling into stock car racing.

Top-ten results

1. 41- Curtis Turner
2. 59- Lloyd Moore
3. 27- Jimmy Florian
4. 21- Tim Flock
5. 42- Lee Petty
6. 90- Frank Mundy
7. 66- Pappy Hough
8. 293- Bob Dickson
9. 8- Dick Linder
10. 89- Pepper Cunningham

=== 1950-04 ===
The fourth race of the 1950 season was run on May 21 at Martinsville Speedway in Martinsville, Virginia, the first race in the lineage of the Virginia 500, the spring race at the track. Buck Baker won the pole. Curtis Turner got his second-straight Grand National win with a decisive triumph. The Roanoke, Virginia, "Blond Bomber" dashed ahead of Baker in the 11th lap and led the rest of the way in the 150-lap, 75 mile feature at the half-mile dirt oval. Jim Paschal finished second in a four-year-old Ford, Lee Petty was third and Glenn Dunnaway came in fourth. Cyde Minter picked up fifth spot. Turner's Oldsmobile outdistanced the field by two full laps. He up to only 2.5 points behind leader Tim Flock, who fell victim to rear end problems after 97 laps. Baker started on the pole at 54.216 mph in a Ford police special. He faded to eighth at the finish. Herb Thomas was running among the leaders in his Ford when a spindle broke in the final laps. He got credit for 14th in the field of 25.

Top-ten results

1. 41- Curtis Turner
2. 79- Jim Paschal
3. 42- Lee Petty
4. 49- Glenn Dunaway
5. 19- Clyde Minter
6. 31- Bill Long
7. 91- Donald Thomas
8. 87- Buck Baker
9. 60- Bill Rexford
10. 59- Lloyd Moore

=== Poor Man's 500 ===
The fifth race of the 1950 season was run on May 30 at Canfield Speedway in Canfield, Ohio. The event was staged on the same day as the Indianapolis 500 — hence the title of the "Poor Man's 500". Jimmy Florian won the pole. Bill Rexford of Conewango Valley, New York, stalked Curtis Turner for over half the race, then took command to win the 100-mile race. Rexford took the lead in the 121st lap and went on to beat runner-up Glenn Dunnaway by two laps. Lloyd Moore finished third and took the lead in the Grand National point standings by 36.5 points over Tim Flock, who finished ninth. Lee Petty crossed the finish line in fourth place and Bill Blair took fifth. The promoters did pay some lap money, with $5 going to the leader of each lap from the 101st through the 200th. Rexford's earnings came to $1,400 with the lap money. Turner led the first 120 laps before his engine went sour. He departed after 133 laps and wound up 19th. A crowd of 11,000 showed up on Memorial Day and watched Al Gross, former stunt car driver for the Jimmy Lynch Thrill Show, flip his Oldsmobile in the ninth lap. Gross suffered a broken back and was taken to the hospital for an extended stay. Frank Canale posted the second-fastest qualifying time but overheating problems forced him out after 74 laps. Joe Merola was on hand with a new radically designed 1948 Tucker Torpedo, one of the most controversial and advanced automobiles. The car went out before Merola was able to complete a lap. This was the first NASCAR race with a name.

Top-ten results

1. 60- Bill Rexford
2. 49- Glenn Dunaway
3. 59- Lloyd Moore
4. 42- Lee Petty
5. 22- Bill Blair
6. 27- Jimmy Florian
7. 48- Dick Burns
8. 89- Bobby Courtwright
9. 90- Tim Flock
10. 293- Bob Dickson

=== 1950-06 ===
The sixth race of the 1950 season was run on June 18 at Vernon Fairgrounds in Vernon, New York. Chuck Mahoney won the pole. Bill Blair of High Point, North Carolina, took the lead in the 25th lap and led the remaining distance to score his first Grand National win at the Vernon Fairgrounds. A crowd of 15,000 showed up for the one-year anniversary of NASCAR Grand National stock car racing. Blair's Mercury was comfortably ahead of Lloyd Moore at the finish of the 100-mile race. Moore extended his point lead to 216.5 points over Tim Rock, who did not enter. Chuck Mahoney was third, while Dick Burns came in fourth and Lee Petty fifth. Mahoney started on the pole and led the first 18 laps. He was in the lead when his Mercury hit a loose wheel rolling on the track, blew a tire and bent an axle. His pit crew did an excellent job of repairing the damage, and even more incredible was his drive back into third place. Bill Rexford finished sixth and moved into the top-ten in points. Ann Chester became the fourth female driver to race in the Grand National ranks. Her Plymouth fell victim to early problems and she finished 22nd in the 23 car field.

Top-ten results

1. 2- Bill Blair
2. 59- Lloyd Moore
3. 77- Chuck Mahoney
4. 18- Dick Burns
5. 42- Lee Petty
6. 60- Bill Rexford
7. 9- Art Lamey
8. 27- Jimmy Florian
9. 25- Dick Linder
10. 24- Dick Clothier

=== 1950-07 ===
The seventh race of the 1950 season was run on June 25 at Dayton Speedway at Dayton, Ohio. Dick Linder won the pole. Jimmy Florian muscled his Ford past Curtis Turner with 32 laps remaining and won the 100-mile event at Dayton Speedway. It was the first win in Grand National competition for the Ford nameplate, and the first NASCAR race held entirely on pavement. The lead changed hands six times among four different drivers with Florian holding the upper hand on two occasions for a total of 40 laps. Along with ushering in Ford's first win, Florian established another "first" on the muggy afternoon. He pulled into victory lane and climbed out wearing nothing but his white pants. The 27-year-old Cleveland mechanic said he decided not to wear a shirt due to the hot weather and since there was no NASCAR rule requiring him to do so. "It was awfully hot and I knew I'd be more comfortable without a shirt," said Florian. "I've done it several times before, but not in the Grand Nationals." Dick Linder started on the pole and led on two occasions for 35 laps. He eventually finished second as Buck Barr came in third. Turner wound up fourth and Art Lamey was fifth. Lloyd Moore finished 23rd in the field of 25 and failed to earn any championship points, but he still held a 202.5 point lead over Lee Petty who finished eighth. Florian jumped to third in the standings, 171.5 points out of first place. Frank Mundy drove a Nash Ambassador, but fell out early with mechanical problems. Herschel Buchanan drove another Nash to a sixth-place finish.

Top-ten results

1. 27- Jimmy Florian
2. 25- Dick Linder
3. 8- Buck Barr
4. 41- Curtis Turner
5. 9- Art Lamey
6. 12- Herschel Buchanan
7. ??- Duane Carter
8. 42- Lee Petty
9. 77- Chuck Mahoney
10. 8- Bill Rexford

=== 1950-08 ===
The eighth race of the 1950 season was run on July 2 at Monroe County Fairgrounds in Rochester, New York. Curtis Turner won the pole. Turner passed the field and cruised to an easy win in the 100-mile Grand National event. It was his fourth career win. Turner, starting his Oldsmobile on the pole, jumped out to an early lead and led the entire 200 laps on the half-mile dirt track. He wound up three laps in front of runner-up Bill Blair, who edged out Lee Petty in a stretch duel. Jimmy Florian was fourth and Bill Rexford fifth. Turner averaged 50.614 mph as three caution flags broke the action for seven total laps. Following the race, Turner and Petty fought at the inspection station. Each was fined $100 by NASCAR. Dick Burns was badly shaken when his Mercury left the track and struck a light pole in the 133rd lap. The event was the first Grand National race in which a father-son duo competed together. Roscoe "Pappy" Hough and his son Lee finished 18th and 25th. Turner's victory pushed him atop the point standings by two points over Lloyd Moore. Petty stood third in points, 24.5 points out of first place, but he was stripped of all 809 points a week later, when NASCAR officials discovered he that competed in a non-sanctioned race.

Top-ten results

1. 41- Curtis Turner
2. 2- Bill Blair
3. 42- Lee Petty
4. 27- Jimmy Florian
5. 80- Bill Rexford
6. 24- Dick Clothier
7. 59- Lloyd Moore
8. 98- Lyle Scott
9. ??‐ Dick Jerrett
10. 25- Dick Linder

=== 1950-09 ===
The ninth race of the 1950 season was run on July 23 at Charlotte Speedway in Charlotte, North Carolina. Curtis Turner won the pole and jumped into the lead in the opening lap and never looked back as he streaked to victory in the 150-mile Grand National race. The muscular driver out of Roanoke, Virginia led from start to finish — the second race in a row that Turner had led every lap. The triumph kept Turner in the Grand National point lead as Lloyd Moore dropped to 21st in the 26 car field. Chuck Mahoney finished in second place, with Herb Thomas, Jimmie Lewallen and Dick Burns rounding out the top five. Bill Blair and Bill Rexford pressured Turner in the early going, but Blair departed with a broken spindle and engine failure put Rexford out of action. Lee Petty and Glenn Dunnaway were running in the top five when both Plymouth drivers lost wheels. They finished 11th and 12th respectively. On the same day, Jim Roper, winner of the first Grand National race at Charlotte on June 19, 1949, won a 20-lap strictly stock outlaw feature at Pratt, Kansas, on a 1.6-mile paved oval, averaging 67.659 mph.

Top-ten results

1. 41- Curtis Turner
2. 77- Chuck Mahoney
3. 92- Herb Thomas
4. ??‐ Jimmie Lewallen
5. 18- Dick Burns
6. 60- George Hartley
7. 9- Donald Thomas
8. ??- Frank Mundy
9. 90- Tim Flock
10. 37- Bill Snowden

=== 1950-10 ===
The tenth race of the 1950 season was run on August 13 at Occoneechee Speedway in Hillsboro, North Carolina. Dick Linder won the pole, and Curtis Turner took the lead on the first lap of the race and maintained it through the next 45 laps. However, on lap 46, Turner blew a tire and went into the pits, leaving him two laps down. This gave the lead to Pee Wee Martin for 12 laps, before Fireball Roberts took over on lap 58. Turner managed to regain the lead lap, but ran out of time to catch Roberts, who scored the first win of his career. Linder finished third, with Bill Rexford fourth, Clyde Minter fifth, and Gene Austin, Lee Petty, Herb Thomas, Chuck Mahoney, and Johnny Mantz rounding out the top 10. Turner's second place kept him at the top of the points standings.

Top-ten results

1. 71- Fireball Roberts
2. 41- Curtis Turner
3. 25- Dick Linder
4. 80- Bill Rexford
5. 19- Clyde Minter
6. ??- Gene Austin
7. 42- Lee Petty
8. 92- Herb Thomas
9. 77- Chuck Mahoney
10. 90- Johnny Mantz

=== 1950-11 ===
The eleventh race of the 1950 season was run on August 20 at Dayton Speedway in Dayton, Ohio. Curtis Turner won the pole and led the first 48 laps, but had problems, ultimately finishing in 23rd. Dick Linder then took control, and dominated the remainder of the event, winning over Red Harvey. Herb Thomas, Lee Petty, and Art Lamey rounded out the top five. The race was shortened by five laps due to a serious crash by Johnny Mantz, when he plowed through a guardrail and Joe Merola drove into the debris. Mantz was uninjured, while Merola only had minor cuts and bruises. Despite his 23rd place, Turner kept the points lead over Lloyd Moore.

Top-ten results

1. 25- Dick Linder
2. ??‐ Red Harvey
3. 92- Herb Thomas
4. 42- Lee Petty
5. ??- Art Lamey
6. ??- Paul Parks
7. ??- Jack Kabat
8. 59- Lloyd Moore
9. 12- Joe Nagle
10. ??- Paul Smith

=== 1950-12 ===
The twelfth race of the 1950 season was run on August 27 at Hamburg Speedway in Hamburg, New York. Dick Linder won the pole, and while Curtis Turner showed a major challenge, leading 74 of the 200 laps, Linder came out on top, winning by 20 yards over Fireball Roberts. Turner, Lloyd Moore, and Jack White made up the rest of the top five.

Top-ten results

1. 25- Dick Linder
2. 11- Fireball Roberts
3. 41- Curtis Turner
4. 59- Lloyd Moore
5. ??- Jack White
6. 80- Bill Rexford
7. ??- Frank Mundy
8. 93- Ted Chamberlain
9. 66- Pappy Hough
10. ??- Bill Blair

=== Southern 500 ===
The inaugural Southern 500 was run on September 4 at Darlington Raceway in Darlington, South Carolina. Curtis Turner won the pole.

Top-ten results

1. 98- Johnny Mantz
2. 82- Fireball Roberts
3. 22- Red Byron
4. 59- Bill Rexford
5. 77- Chuck Mahoney
6. 42- Lee Petty
7. 71- Cotton Owens
8. 2- Bill Blair
9. 52- Hershel McGriff
10. 61- George Hartley

=== 1950-14 ===
The fourteenth race of the 1950 season was run on September 17 at Langhorne Speedway in Langhorne, Pennsylvania. Wally Campbell won the pole.

Top-ten results

1. 47- Fonty Flock
2. 2- Bill Blair
3. 82- Fireball Roberts
4. 42- Lee Petty
5. ??- Neil Cole
6. 88- Pepper Cunningham
7. 87- Buck Baker
8. 60- Bill Rexford
9. 44- Johnny Grubb
10. 46- Kenneth Wagner

=== Wilkes 200 ===
The Wilkes 200 was run on September 24 at North Wilkesboro Speedway in North Wilkesboro, North Carolina. Fireball Roberts won the pole.

Top-ten results

1. 98- Leon Sales
2. ??- Jack Smith
3. 78- Ewell Weddle
4. 92- Herb Thomas
5. 44- Gayle Warren
6. 52- Weldon Adams
7. ??- Jimmy Thompson
8. ??- Jerry Wimbish
9. 7- Bob Flock
10. 94- Herbert Burns

=== 1950-16 ===
The sixteenth race of the 1950 season was run on October 1 at Vernon Fairgrounds in Vernon, New York. Dick Linder won the pole.

Top-ten results

1. 25- Dick Linder
2. 38- Ted Swaim
3. 59- Lloyd Moore
4. 9- Tim Flock
5. ??- Jack Reynolds
6. 60- Bill Rexford
7. 42- Lee Petty
8. ??- Jimmy Thompson
9. 77- Chuck Mahoney
10. ??- Dick Jerrett

=== 1950-17 ===
The seventeenth race of the 1950 season was run on October 15 at Martinsville Speedway in Martinsville, Virginia, a race now regarded as the second edition of the Old Dominion 500 (the distance changed after the track was paved in 1955 from 200 to 400, and then 500 laps). Fonty Flock won the pole. This race was team owner Junie Donlavey's first career start, fielding an Oldsmobile driven by Runt Harris.

Top-ten results

1. 92- Herb Thomas
2. 42- Lee Petty
3. 87- Buck Baker
4. 7- Fonty Flock
5. 52- Weldon Adams
6. 11- Fireball Roberts
7. 8- Jack Holloway
8. 25- Jimmy Thompson
9. 30- Jim Paschal
10. 93- Ted Chamberlain

=== 1950-18 ===
The eighteenth race of the 1950 season was run on October 15 at Funk's Speedway in Winchester, Indiana. Dick Linder won the pole.

Top-ten results

1. 59- Lloyd Moore
2. 101- Bucky Sager
3. 60- Bill Rexford
4. ??- Chuck James
5. 10- Ray Duhigg
6. ??- Carl Renner
7. 27- Jimmy Florian
8. ??- Chuck Garrett
9. ??- Bud Boone
10. 8- Buck Barr

=== 1950-19 ===
The nineteenth and final race of the 1950 season was run on October 29 at Occoneechee Speedway in Hillsboro, North Carolina. Fonty Flock won the pole.

Top-ten results

1. 42- Lee Petty
2. 87- Buck Baker
3. 72- Weldon Adams
4. 98- Tim Flock
5. 41.5- Bill Blair
6. 44- Gayle Warren
7. 10- Ray Duhigg
8. 99- Jim Delaney
9. 18- Herbert Burns
10. 8- Jack Holloway

== Results and standings ==
=== Races ===
| No. | Race | Pole position | Most laps led | Winning driver | Manufacturer | Model Year |
|---|---|---|---|---|---|---|
| 1 | 1950–01 | (South Carolina) Joe Littlejohn | (Georgia (U.S. state)) Harold Kite | (Georgia (U.S. state)) Harold Kite | Lincoln | 1949 |
| 2 | 1950–02 | (Alabama) Red Byron | (Georgia (U.S. state)) Tim Flock | (Georgia (U.S. state)) Tim Flock | Lincoln | 1949 |
| 3 | 1950–03 | (Georgia (U.S. state)) Tim Flock | (Virginia) Curtis Turner | (Virginia) Curtis Turner | Oldsmobile | 1950 |
| 4 | 1950–04 | (North Carolina) Buck Baker | (Virginia) Curtis Turner | (Virginia) Curtis Turner | Oldsmobile | 1950 |
| 5 | Poor Man's 500 | (Ohio) Jimmy Florian | (Virginia) Curtis Turner | (New York (state)) Bill Rexford | Oldsmobile | 1950 |
| 6 | 1950–06 | (New York (state)) Chuck Mahoney | (North Carolina) Bill Blair | (North Carolina) Bill Blair | Mercury | 1950 |
| 7 | 1950–07 | (Pennsylvania) Dick Linder | (Virginia) Curtis Turner | (Ohio) Jimmy Florian | Ford | 1950 |
| 8 | 1950–08 | (Virginia) Curtis Turner | (Virginia) Curtis Turner | (Virginia) Curtis Turner | Oldsmobile | 1950 |
| 9 | 1950–09 | (Virginia) Curtis Turner | (Virginia) Curtis Turner | (Virginia) Curtis Turner | Oldsmobile | 1950 |
| 10 | 1950–10 | (Pennsylvania) Dick Linder | (Virginia) Curtis Turner | (Florida) Fireball Roberts | Oldsmobile | 1949 |
| 11 | 1950–11 | (Virginia) Curtis Turner | (Pennsylvania) Dick Linder | (Pennsylvania) Dick Linder | Oldsmobile | 1950 |
| 12 | 1950–12 | (Pennsylvania) Dick Linder | (Pennsylvania) Dick Linder | (Pennsylvania) Dick Linder | Oldsmobile | 1950 |
| 13 | Southern 500 | (Virginia) Curtis Turner | (California) Johnny Mantz | (California) Johnny Mantz | Plymouth | 1950 |
| 14 | 1950–14 | (New Jersey) Wally Campbell | (Georgia (U.S. state)) Fonty Flock | (Georgia (U.S. state)) Fonty Flock | Oldsmobile | 1950 |
| 15 | Wilkes 200 | (Florida) Fireball Roberts | (Georgia (U.S. state)) Fonty Flock | (North Carolina) Leon Sales | Plymouth | 1950 |
| 16 | 1950–16 | (Pennsylvania) Dick Linder | (Pennsylvania) Dick Linder | (Pennsylvania) Dick Linder | Oldsmobile | 1950 |
| 17 | 1950–17 | (Georgia (U.S. state)) Fonty Flock | (North Carolina) Herb Thomas | (North Carolina) Herb Thomas | Plymouth | 1950 |
| 18 | 1950–18 | (Pennsylvania) Dick Linder | (Ohio) Bucky Sager | (New York (state)) Lloyd Moore | Mercury | 1950 |
| 19 | 1950–19 | (Georgia (U.S. state)) Fonty Flock | (Georgia (U.S. state)) Fonty Flock | (North Carolina) Lee Petty | Plymouth | 1949 |

=== Drivers' championship ===
For the 1950 season, the number of points awarded depended on the purse of the race. Most races were worth around $4000, and so the winner got 200 points, second place 180 points, third place 160, and so on. Points were awarded somewhat inconsistently and in particular, the lowest place that got awarded points changed from race to race. The Southern 500, with an incredible $25325 purse, awarded 1250 points, enough to finish in 6th just by winning that one race. Confusing the matter further, many people got deducted points for taking place in non-NASCAR-sanctioned races.

(key) Bold - Pole position * – Most laps led.

| Pos. | Driver | Races | | | | | | | | | | | | | | | | | | | Points |
| Pos. | Driver | DAB | CHA | LAN | MAR | POR | VER | DAY | MON | CHA | OCC | DAY | HAM | DAR | LAN | NWS | VER | MAR | FNK | OCC | Points |
|---|---|---|---|---|---|---|---|---|---|---|---|---|---|---|---|---|---|---|---|---|---|
| 1 | (New York (state)) Bill Rexford | 29 | 13 | 22 | 9 | 1 | 6 | 10 | 5 | 19 | 4 | 14 | 6 | 4 | 8 | | 6 | | 3 | 26 | 1959 |
| 2 | (Florida) Fireball Roberts | 33 | | 15 | | | | | | | 1 | | 2 | 2 | 3 | **16** | | 6 | | 21 | 1848 1/2 |
| 3 | (North Carolina) Lee Petty | 16 | 18 | 5 | 3 | 4 | 5 | 8 | 3 | 11 | 7 | 4 | 27 | 6 | 4 | | 7 | 2 | | 1 | 1590 (Note: Petty was deducted 809 points for taking part in a non-NASCAR sanctioned race. Without that penalty, he would have comfortably won the 1950 championship.) |
| 4 | (New York (state)) Lloyd Moore | 3 | 14 | 2 | 10 | 3 | 2 | 23 | 7 | 21 | DNQ | 8 | 4 | 71 | 16 | | 3 | | 1 | 17 | 1398 |
| 5 | (Virginia) Curtis Turner | 11 | 15 | 1* | 1* | 19* | | 4* | **1*** | **1*** | 2* | **23** | 3 | **60** | 24 | 22 | | 17 | | 29 | 1375 1/2 |
| 6 | (California) Johnny Mantz | | | | | | | | | | 10 | 12 | | 1* | | | | | | | 1282 |
| 7 | (New York (state)) Chuck Mahoney | | | | | 15 | **3** | 9 | 17 | 2 | 9 | 27 | 16 | 5 | 31 | | 9 | | | | 1217 1/2 |
| 8 | (Pennsylvania) Dick Linder | | | 9 | | 13 | 9 | **2** | 10 | 22 | **3** | 1* | **1*** | 13 | 30 | | **1*** | | **13** | | 1121 |
| 9 | (Ohio) Jimmy Florian | | | 3 | | **6** | 8 | 1 | 4 | | 19 | 22 | 26 | 41 | | | | | 7 | | 801 |
| 10 | (North Carolina) Bill Blair | 34 | 19 | 19 | 11 | 5 | 1* | 16 | 2 | 16 | 27 | | 10 | 8 | 2 | 11 | | 16 | | 5 | 766 |
| 11 | (North Carolina) Herb Thomas | | 9 | 23 | 14 | | 20 | | 21 | 3 | 8 | 3 | | | 13 | 4 | 11 | 1* | | 18 | 590 1/2 |
| 12 | (North Carolina) Buck Baker | 9 | 22 | | **8** | | | | | 14 | | | | 69 | 7 | 14 | | 3 | | 2 | 531 1/2 |
| 13 | (South Carolina) Cotton Owens | 14 | 16 | | | | | | | | | | | 7 | | | | | | | 500 |
| 14 | (Georgia (U.S. state)) Fonty Flock | 10 | 21 | | | | | | | | | | | 28 | 1* | 18* | | **4** | | **20*** | 458 1/2 |
| 15 | (Georgia (U.S. state)) Weldon Adams | | | | | | | | | | | | | 15 | | 6 | | 5 | | 3 | 440 |
| 16 | (Georgia (U.S. state)) Tim Flock | 6 | 1* | **4** | 20 | 9 | | | | 9 | | | | 11 | 19 | 24 | 4 | 12 | | 4 | 437 1/2 |
| 17 | (Virginia) Clyde Minter | | 3 | | 5 | | | | | 23 | 5 | | | 65 | | 15 | | 14 | | 19 | 427 |
| 18 | (Pennsylvania) Dick Burns | | | | | 7 | 4 | | 22 | 5 | 22 | 18 | 30 | | DNP | | | | | | 341 1/2 |
| 19 | (Wisconsin) Art Lamey | | | | | | 7 | 5 | | | | 5 | 24 | | | | | | | | 320 |
| 20 | (Georgia (U.S. state)) Bob Flock | 7 | 2 | | | | | | | | | | | 27 | | 9 | | | | | 314 |
| 21 | (Pennsylvania) George Hartley | | | | | | | 11 | | 6 | 11 | 20 | 29 | 10 | 11 | | | | | 11 | 298 |
| 22 | (Virginia) Gayle Warren | | | | | | | 21 | 14 | 26 | 20 | 28 | 25 | 68 | | 5 | | 18 | | 6 | 287 |
| 23 | (Georgia (U.S. state)) Frank Mundy | 37 | 11 | 6 | | | | 25 | | 8 | | | 7 | | 32 | | 22 | | | | 275 1/2 |
| 24 | (North Carolina) Jim Paschal | | 23 | | 2 | | | | | 20 | | | | 53 | | | | 9 | | 28 | 220 1/2 |
| 25 | (New York (state)) Jack White | 20 | 7 | 25 | 22 | | | | | | | | 5 | 24 | | | 27 | | | | 211 1/2 |
| 26 | (New Jersey) Pappy Hough | | | 7 | | | 11 | | 18 | | | | 9 | | 28 | | | | | | 207 1/2 |
| 27 | (Ohio) Ray Duhigg | | | | | | | | | | 23 | 24 | | | 27 | | | | 5 | 7 | 202 1/2 |
| 28 | (North Carolina) Leon Sales | | | | | | | | | | | | | | | 1 | | 21 | | | 200 |
| 29 | (North Carolina) Jimmy Thompson | | | | | | | | | | | | | 40 | | 7 | 8 | 8 | | | 200 |
| 30 | (Georgia (U.S. state)) Harold Kite | 1* | | | | | | | | | | | | 38 | | 12 | | | | | 187 |
| 31 | (New Jersey) Neil Cole | | | | | | 18 | | | | | | | | 5 | | | | | | 183 1/2 |
| 32 | (Georgia (U.S. state)) Jack Smith | 27 | | | | | | | | | | | | 29 | | 2 | | | | | 180 |
| 33 | (Ohio) Bucky Sager | | | | | | | | | | | | | | | | | | 2* | 27 | 180 |
| 34 | (Ohio) Red Harvey | | | | | | | | | | | 2 | | | | | | | | | 180 |
| 35 | (North Carolina) Ted Swaim | | | | | | | | | | | | | | | | 2 | | | | 180 |
| 36 | (Ohio) Buck Barr | | | | | | | 3 | | | | | | | | | | | 10 | | 180 |
| 37 | (New Jersey) Pepper Cunningham | | | 10 | | | | | | | | | | | 6 | | | | | | 177 1/2 |
| 38 | (North Carolina) Ewell Weddle | | | | | | | | | | | | | | | 3 | | 13 | | 14 | 173 1/2 |
| 39 | (North Carolina) Donald Thomas | | | | 7 | | | | | 7 | | | | | | | | | | | 164 |
| 40 | (Florida) Bill Snowden | | 5 | | | | | | | 10 | 13 | | | 37 | | | | | | | 163 |
| 41 | (North Carolina) Jimmie Lewallen | | | | | | | | | 4 | 21 | | | 43 | | | | | | | 140 |
| 42 | (Ohio) Chuck James | | | | | | | | | | | | | | | | | | 4 | | 140 |
| 43 | (New Jersey) Dick Clothier | 36 | | | | | 10 | 12 | 6 | 18 | | | | | | | | | | | 133 1/2 |
| 44 | (Ohio) Paul Parks | | | 20 | | | | | | | | 6 | 32 | | 12 | 17 | 15 | | | | 124 1/2 |
| 45 | (Florida) Al Gross | 4 | | | 18 | 28 | | | | | | | | | | | | | | | 124 |
| 46 | (New Jersey) Jack Reynolds | | | | | | | | | | | | | | | | 5 | | | 24 | 120 |
| 47 | (New Jersey) Jim Delaney | | | | | | | | | | | | | | | | 14 | | | 8 | 114 |
| 48 | (Ohio) Carl Renner | | | | | | | | | | | 13 | | | | | | | 6 | | 108 |
| 49 | (North Carolina) Jack Holloway | | | | | | | | | | | | | | | | | 7 | | 10 | 107 1/2 |
| 50 | (Florida) J. C. Van Landingham | 5 | | | | | | | | | | | | | | | | | | | 105 |
| 51 | (New Jersey) Bob Dickson | | | 6 | 16 | 10 | | | 12 | | | | 31 | | 36 | | | | | | 105 |
| 52 | (New York (state)) Gene Austin | | | | | | 17 | | | | 6 | | | | | | | | | | 102 |
| 53 | (Louisiana) Herschel Buchanan | 39 | | | | | | 6 | | | | | | | | | | | | | 100 |
| 54 | (North Carolina) Bill Long | | | | 6 | | | | | | | | | | | | | | | | 100 |
| 55 | (West Virginia) Johnny Grubb | | | | | | | | | | | | | 12 | 9 | | | 11 | | 12 | 98 |
| 56 | (California) Duane Carter | | | | | | | 7 | | | | | | | | | | | | | 80 |
| 56 | (Ohio) Jack Kabat | | | | | | | | | | | 7 | | | | | | | | | 80 |
| 58 | (Florida) Herbert Burns | | | | | | | | | | | | | | | 10 | | | | 9 | 75 |
| 59 | (New York (state)) Lyle Scott | | | 24 | 15 | | | | 8 | 24 | 14 | | 19 | | | | | | | | 68 |
| 60 | (North Carolina) Fred Johnson | | 8 | 26 | | | | | | | | | | | | | | | | | 67 1/2 |
| 61 | (New York (state)) Ted Chamberlain | | | | | | | | | | | | 8 | 34 | | | 17 | 10 | | 15 | 66 |
| 62 | (New Jersey) Bobby Courtwright | | | | | 8 | | | | | | | | | | | | | | | 60 |
| 62 | (Pennsylvania) Chuck Garrett | | | | | | | | | | | | | | | | | | 8 | | 60 |
| 62 | (Georgia (U.S. state)) Jerry Wimbish | | | | | | | | | | | | | | | 8 | | | | | 60 |
| 65 | (North Carolina) Pap White | | | | | | | | | | 16 | | | DNQ | | | | | | | 57 1/2 |
| Pos. | Driver | Races | | | | | | | | | | | | | | | | | | | Points |
| Pos. | Driver | DAB | CHA | LAN | MAR | POR | VER | DAY | MON | CHA | OCC | DAY | HAM | DAR | LAN | NWS | VER | MAR | FNK | OCC | Points |

==== Notable drivers who did not score points ====
- (Alabama) Red Byron – All points were deducted
- (North Carolina) Glenn Dunaway – All points were deducted
- (Oregon) Hershel McGriff
- (North Carolina) Speedy Thompson
