= J. C. Van Landingham =

American stock car racing driver

- Born: Clarence Van Landingham; 1917 or 1918; Greensboro, Florida, U.S.
- Died: March 5, 1996 (aged 78); DeLand, Florida, U.S.

NASCAR Cup Series career
- 1 race run over 1 year
- Best finish: 50th (1950)
- First race: 1950 Race No. 1 (Daytona Beach)
Wins	Top tens	Poles
0	1	0

Clarence "J. C." Van Landingham (c. 1918–1996) was an American stock car racing driver. A Florida native, he competed in the NASCAR Grand National Series, in 1950, later owning a car in the series.

== Life and career ==
Born in Greensboro, Florida, Van Landingham relocated to DeLand, Florida in 1921; a World War II veteran of the United States Navy, he was the owner of Inland Buick and Inland Plymouth Dodge-Chrysler in DeLand. In 1950, Van Landingham competed in a race at the Daytona Beach and Road Course; he started second and finished fifth in the event, driving a Buick. He later entered a car driven by Dick Joslin in the event in 1955.

In the late 1960s, Van Landingham served as the president of the DeLand Chamber of Commerce. He died on March 5, 1996.

== Motorsports career results ==
=== NASCAR ===
(key) (Bold – Pole position awarded by qualifying time. Italics – Pole position earned by points standings or practice time. * – Most laps led.)

==== Grand National Series ====
NASCAR Grand National Series results
Year	Team owner	No.	Make	1	2	3	4	5	6	7	8	9	10	11	12	13	14	15	16	17	18	19	NGNC	Pts	Ref
1950	J.C. Van Landingham	35	Buick	DAB; 5	CLT	LAN	MAR	CAN	VER	DSP	MCF	CLT	HBO	DSP	HAM	DAR	LAN	NWS	VER	MAR	WIN	HBO	50th	105	
