= Fonty Flock =

American racing driver (1921–1972)

- Born: Truman Fontell Flock; March 21, 1921; Fort Payne, Alabama, U.S.
- Died: July 15, 1972 (aged 51); Atlanta, Georgia, U.S.
- Achievements: 1947 National Championship Stock Car Circuit Champion; 1949 NASCAR National Modified Champion; 1952 Southern 500 Winner
- Awards: Georgia Automobile Racing Hall of Fame Association (2004); Talladega-Texaco Walk of Fame (2004); Motorsports Hall of Fame (historical) (2023)

NASCAR Cup Series career
- 154 races run over 9 years
- Best finish: 2nd (1951)
- First race: 1949 Race No. 1 (Charlotte)
- Last race: 1957 Southern 500 (Darlington)
- First win: 1950 (Langhorne)
- Last win: 1956 (Charlotte)
Wins	Top tens	Poles
19	83	33

NASCAR Convertible Division career
- 3 races run over 1 year
- Best finish: 37th (1956)
- First race: 1956 Race #5 (Peach Bowl)
- Last race: 1956 Race #14 (Columbia)
- First win: 1956 Race #5 (Peach Bowl)
Wins	Top tens	Poles
1	2	0

Truman Fontell "Fonty" Flock (March 21, 1921 – July 15, 1972) was an American stock car racer.

== Flock family ==
Flock was the brother of NASCAR pioneers Tim Flock and Bob Flock, and the second female NASCAR driver Ethel Mobley. The four raced at the July 10, 1949, race at the Daytona Beach Road Course, which was the first event to feature a brother and a sister, and the only NASCAR event to feature four siblings. Ethel beat Fonty and Bob by finishing in eleventh.

== Racing career ==
=== Moonshine ===
Like many early NASCAR drivers, Flock's career began by delivering illegal moonshine. He started delivering on his bicycle as a teenager. He used his car to deliver moonshine as he got older. "I used to deliberately seek out the sheriff and get him to chase me," he later recalled. "It was fun, and besides we could send to California to get special parts to modify our cars, and the sheriff couldn't afford to do that."

=== Early career ===
Flock won a 100-mile race at Lakewood Speedway Park in Atlanta, Georgia, in 1940. He raced on dirt tracks in Georgia.

Flock qualified in the pole position for the July 27, 1941, race at the Daytona Beach Road Course beside Roy Hall. Flock took the early lead before he and Hall got together in the south turn. Flock rolled and landed upside down in bushes. The seatbelt broke during the rolling, and Flock was tossed around. He was rushed by ambulance to the hospital, having suffered a crushed chest, broken pelvis, head and back injuries, and severe shock.

=== World War II ===
Flock was in the United States Army Air Corps for four years during World War II.

=== NASCAR career ===
Flock's brother convinced car owner Ed Schenck to put Flock in his car at the first race at the North Wilkesboro Speedway on May 5, 1947. Flock won the pole and his heat race. He won the 30-lap feature after not racing in 4 1/2 years. He took over his brother Bob's ride later in the season after Bob broke his back. He won seven of 47 races that season, and beat Ed Samples and Red Byron to win the National Championship Stock Car Circuit championship.

Flock won eleven features and won the NASCAR National Modified championship in 1949. He raced in six of eight Strictly Stock (later Grand National Series) events and finished fifth in the points.

Flock raced his first full-time season in the Grand National series in 1951. He had eight wins, 22 Top-10s, and 13 poles to finish second in the points. He won the 100-mile Grand National Stock Car race at Bainbridge Speedway, Solon, Ohio, on July 9, 1951.

Flock had two wins, 17 top-tens, and seven poles in 1952. He finished fourth in the points.

Flock was leading by more than a minute at the 1953 Daytona Beach Road Course race but ran out of gas taking the white flag at the start of the final lap. Flock's teammate pushed his car into the pits. Bill Blair passed to win the race in a 1953 Oldsmobile. Flock finished second by 26 seconds. He had four wins, 17 top-ten finishes, and three poles to finish fourth in the final points.

Flock opened an insurance agency in 1954, racing part-time after that.

Flock raced 31 of 45 events in 1955. He had three wins, 14 top-tens, and six poles. He finished eleventh in the points.

Flock had his final win in 1956 at the Charlotte Speedway.

In 1957, Flock raced at the Daytona Beach Road Course. Herb Thomas had been gravely injured in a 1956 race held at the Cleveland County Fairgrounds in Shelby, North Carolina, so he asked Flock to drive the car in the 1957 Southern 500. Flock accepted. He spun and was smashed by Bobby Myers and Paul Goldsmith on lap 27, injuring all, Myers fatally. From the hospital bed, Flock announced his retirement. He died on July 15, 1972, after a lengthy illness.

== Awards ==
- Flock was inducted in the Talladega-Texaco Walk of Fame in 2004.
- Flock was inducted into the Georgia Automobile Racing Hall of Fame Association in 2004.

== Media ==
Flock appeared as a mystery challenger on the April 15, 1956, episode of What's My Line? on CBS television.

== Motorsports career results ==
=== NASCAR ===
(key) (Bold – Pole position awarded by qualifying time. Italics – Pole position earned by points standings or practice time. * – Most laps led. ** – All laps led.)

==== Grand National Series ====
NASCAR Grand National Series results
Year	Team	No.	Make	1	2	3	4	5	6	7	8	9	10	11	12	13	14	15	16	17	18	19	20	21	22	23	24	25	26	27	28	29	30	31	32	33	34	35	36	37	38	39	40	41	42	43	44	45	46	47	48	49	50	51	52	53	54	55	56	NGNC	Pts	Ref
1949	Grady Cole	47	Hudson	CLT; 2																																																								5th	554.5	
1949	Gene Horne	47	Hudson		DAB; 19																																																							5th	554.5	
1949	Ed Lawrence	47	Buick			HBO; 4	LAN; 45	HAM	MAR; 12	HEI	NWS; 3																																																	5th	554.5	
1950	Ed Lawrence	47	Buick	DAB; 10	CLT; 21	LAN	MAR	CAN	VER	DSP	MCF	CLT	HBO	DSP	HAM																																													14th	458.5	
1950	Frank Christian	47	Olds													DAR; 28	LAN; 1*	NWS; 18*	VER																																									14th	458.5	
1950	Frank Christian	7	Olds																	**MAR**; 4	WIN	**HBO**; 20*																																						14th	458.5	
1951	Frank Christian	14	Olds	DAB; 3	**CLT**; 20	NMO; 2	GAR	**HBO**; 1**	**ASF**; 4	**NWS**; 1**	MAR; 5	CAN; 3	CLS; 25	CLB; 12	DSP; 4	GAR	GRS; 3	**BAI**; 1**	**HEI**; 36	**AWS**; 1	**MCF**; 14*	**ALS**; 1**	MSF; 35	**FMS**; 18*	MOR; 30	ABS; 4	DAR; 8	CLB; 10	CCS; 4	**LAN**; 3*	CLT	**DSP**; 1**	**WIL**; 1	HBO; 15*	TPN	PGS	MAR	OAK; 11		HMS; 24	JSP; 3	ATL	**GAR**; 11	NMO; 4																2nd	4062.25	
1951	Ted Chester	7	Olds																																				NWS; 1*																					2nd	4062.25	
1952	Frank Christian	14	Olds	PBS; 3	DAB; 4	JSP; 6	NWS; 2	MAR; 15	CLB		CCS; 2	LAN; 5	DAR; 3	**DSP**; 11	CAN; 17	HAY	**FMS**; 5	**HBO**; 2	**CLT**; 11	MSF; 47			MON; 4	MOR	PPS; 15	MCF	AWS; 12*	**DAR**; 1*	**CCS**; 24	LAN; 26	**DSP**; 16*	WIL; 18	HBO; 1*	MAR; 2	NWS; 2	ATL; 19	PBS; 2																							4th	5183.5	
1952	Frank Christian	4	Olds							ATL; 7																																																		4th	5183.5	
1952		7	Kaiser																		NIF; 7	OSW																																						4th	5183.5	
1953	Frank Christian	14	Olds	PBS; 11	DAB; 2*	HAR; 14	NWS; 3	CLT; 25	RCH	CCS; 4*	LAN; 3		HCY; 26	MAR; 29	**PMS**; 15		LOU; 11	FIF																CCS; 14																										5th	6174	
1953	Frank Christian	14	Hudson									CLB; 14				RSP; 1*			LAN; 31	TCS; 23	WIL; 1	MCF	PIF; 4	MOR	ATL; 12	RVS; 3	LCF; 16	DAV; 5	HBO; 12	AWS; 1	PAS; 2	HCY; 1*	**DAR**; 2		LAN; 35	BLF; 15	WIL; 3	NWS; 2	**MAR**; 3	ATL; 2																				5th	6174	
1954	Frank Christian	14	Hudson	PBS; 12		JSP; 2		OSP; 11	OAK	NWS	HBO	CCS	LAN	WIL	MAR	SHA	RSP	CLT	GAR	CLB	LND	HCY	MCF	WGS	PIF	AWS	SFS	GRS	MOR	OAK	CLT	SAN	COR	DAR	CCS	CLT	LAN	MAS	MAR	NWS																				–	–	
1954	Raymond Parks	99	Buick		DAB; 57																																																							–	–	
1954	Raymond Parks	99	Hudson				ATL; 5																																																					–	–	
1955	Frank Christian	14	Olds	TCS	PBS	JSP	DAB; 5	OSP																																																				11th	4266	
1955	Frank Christian	14	Chevy						CLB; 1	HBO; 5	NWS; 20	MGY; 3	LAN; 22	CLT; 23	HCY	ASF; 28	TUS																																											11th	4266	
1955	Carl Kiekhaefer	301	Chrysler															MAR; 23	RCH; 2	NCF; 2	**FOR**; 21	LIN; 28	MCF; 2	FON; 11			PIF; 2	CLB; 15	AWS; 2	MOR; 26	ALS	NYF	SAN	CLT		**MAS**; 1*	RSP; 9*			LAN; 3	**RSP**; 1*		**MAS**; 39	CLB	MAR; 25	LVP	NWS; 6	HBO												11th	4266	
1955		15	Olds																						AIR; 11	CLT																																		11th	4266	
1955	Carl Kiekhaefer	300	Chrysler																																FOR; 16																									11th	4266	
1955	Carl Kiekhaefer	36	Chrysler																																			DAR; 51																						11th	4266	
1955	Thomas Racing	91	Chevy																																				MGY; 23			GPS; 25																		11th	4266	
1956	DePaolo Engineering	297	Ford	HCY; 8																																																								50th	946	
1956	Carl Kiekhaefer	301	Chrysler		**CLT**; 1**	WSS	**PBS**; 19	ASF																																																				50th	946	
1956	Carl Kiekhaefer	500B	Dodge						DAB; 10	PBS	WIL																																																	50th	946	
1956	A. L. Bumgarner	55	Pontiac									ATL; 7	NWS																																															50th	946	
1956	Carl Kiekhaefer	34	Chrysler											LAN; 39	RCH	CLB	CON	GPS	HCY	HBO	MAR	LIN	CLT	POR	EUR	NYF	MER	MAS	CLT	MCF	POR	AWS	RSP	PIF	CSF	CHI	CCF	MGY	OKL	ROA	OBS	SAN	NOR	PIF	MYB	POR														50th	946	
1956	Bill Stroppe	15	Mercury																																												DAR; 58	CSH	CLT	LAN	POR	CLB	HBO	NWP	CLT	CCF	MAR	HCY	WIL	50th	946	
1957	Bill Stroppe	18	Mercury	WSS	CON	TIC	DAB; 3	CON	WIL	HBO	AWS	NWS	LAN	CLT	PIF	GBF	POR	CCF	RCH	MAR	POR	EUR	LIN	LCS	ASP	NWP	CLB	CPS	PIF	JAC	RSP	CLT	MAS	POR	HCY	NOR	LCS	GLN	KPC	LIN	OBS	MYB																		61st	540	
1957	Thomas Racing	92	Pontiac																																								DAR; 48	NYF	AWS	CSF	SCF	LAN	CLB	CCF	CLT	MAR	NBR	CON	NWS	GBF				61st	540	

==== Convertible Division ====
NASCAR Convertible Division results
Year	Team	No.	Make	1	2	3	4	5	6	7	8	9	10	11	12	13	14	15	16	17	18	19	20	21	22	23	24	25	26	27	28	29	30	31	32	33	34	35	36	37	38	39	40	41	42	43	44	45	46	47	NCC	Pts	Ref
1956	Hubert Westmoreland	33	Chevy	DAB	CLT	HBO	FAY	PCH; 1	MGY	HCY	LCS	GBF	OBS	RSP																																					37th	528	
1956	Frank Christian	14	Chevy												LAN; 15	STR	CLB; 7	LKS	TUL	TFT	KSF	MOF	NOR	WIL	CHI	FRS	NYF	TOR	BUF	BEL	LIN	FWS	BGS	CLB	HCY	CLT	FRS	MCF	HEI	RSP	GPS	ATL	MCC	CHI	MAS	CCF	MAR	PIF	AWS	HBO	37th	528	

Sporting positions
Preceded by Ed Samples	National Championship Stock Car Circuit Champion; 1947	Succeeded by Red Byron (NASCAR)
Preceded by Red Byron	NASCAR Modified Division Champion; 1949	Succeeded by Charles Dyer
