= Van Landingham =

Van Landingham is a Dutch surname. Notable people with the surname include:

- J. C. Van Landingham, American stock car racing driver
- Marian Van Landingham (born 1937), American politician and artist
- Mary Oates Spratt Van Landingham (1852–1937), American historian and civic leader
- William Van Landingham (born 1970), American baseball player

== See also ==
- Josh Vanlandingham, American basketball player
