= Herb Thomas =

American racing driver (1923–2000)

Herbert Thomas
- Born: April 6, 1923; Olivia, North Carolina, U.S.
- Died: August 9, 2000 (aged 77); Sanford, North Carolina, U.S.
- Cause of death: Heart attack
- Achievements: 1951 NASCAR Grand National Series Champion 1953 NASCAR Grand National Series Champion; 1951, 1954, 1955 Southern 500 Winner; NASCAR's First Two-Time Champion; Led Cup Series in Wins 3 times (1952, 1953, 1954) Highest win percentage of any driver with over 100 starts (21.05%).
- Awards: International Motorsports Hall of Fame (1994) NASCAR Hall of Fame (2013) Named one of NASCAR's 50 Greatest Drivers (1998); Named one of NASCAR's 75 Greatest Drivers (2023)

NASCAR Cup Series career
- 228 races run over 10 years
- Best finish: 1st (1951, 1953)
- First race: 1949 Race No. 1 (Charlotte)
- Last race: 1962 Gwyn Staley 400 (North Wilkesboro)
- First win: 1950 (Martinsville)
- Last win: 1956 (Merced)
Wins	Top tens	Poles
48	156	39

NASCAR Convertible Division career
- 1 race run over 1 year
- Best finish: 40th (1956)
- First race: 1956 Race #1 (Daytona Beach & Road Course)
Wins	Top tens	Poles
0	1	0
- Statistics up to date as of February 20, 2013.

Herbert Watson Thomas (April 6, 1923–August 9, 2000) was a stock car racer who was one of NASCAR's most successful drivers in the 1950s. Thomas was NASCAR's first multi-time Cup Champion.

== Background ==
Born in the small town of Olivia, North Carolina, Thomas worked as a farmer and worked in a sawmill in the 1940s before his interest turned to auto racing.

== NASCAR career ==
In 1949, Thomas took part in NASCAR's first Strictly Stock (the forerunner to the Grand National and ultimately the modern NASCAR Cup Series) race and made four starts in the series' first year. The following year, he made thirteen appearances in the series, now renamed the Grand National division. He scored his first career win at Martinsville Speedway in a privateer Plymouth.

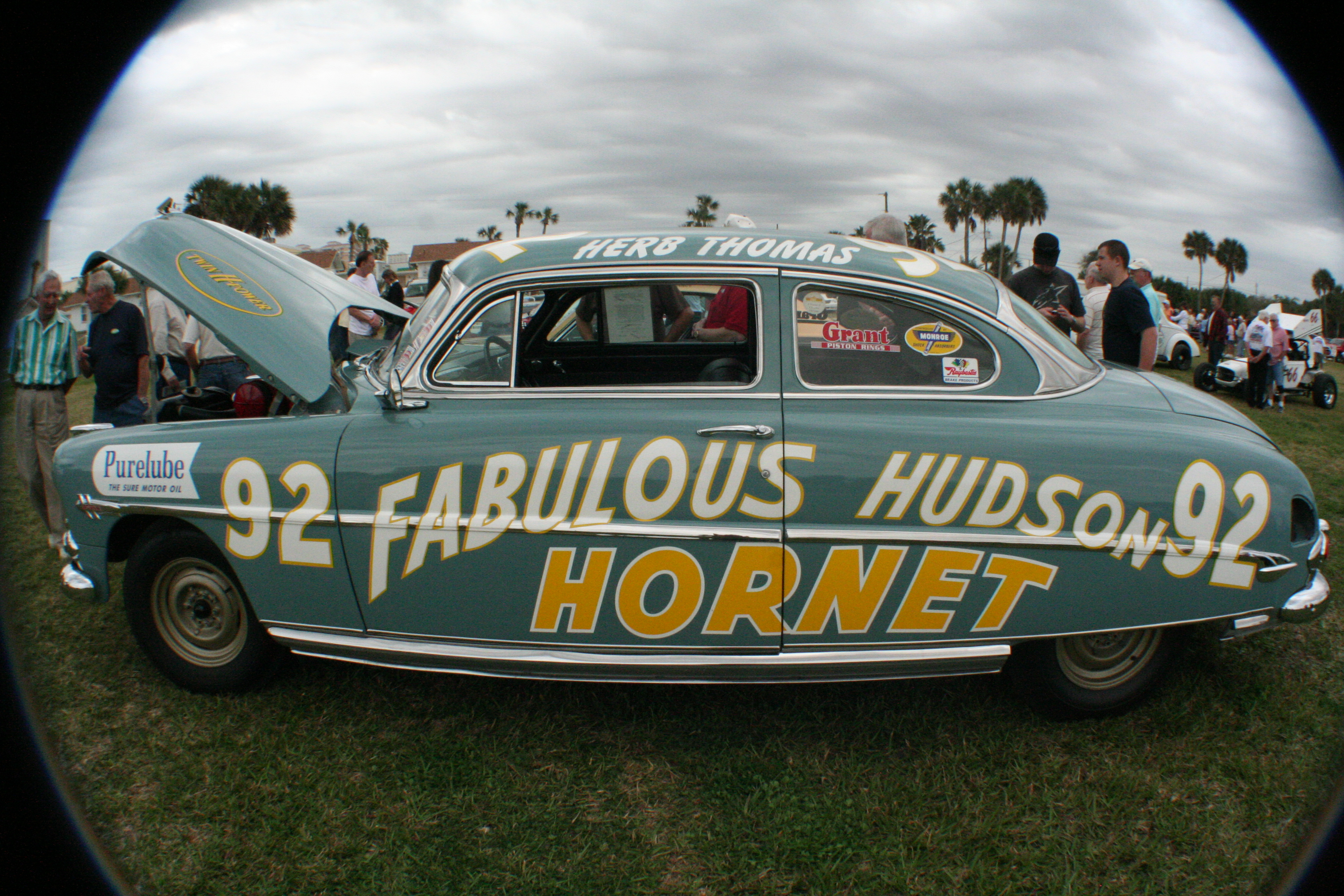
Thomas' No. 92 Fabulous Hudson Hornet

Thomas started the 1951 season with moderate success in his Plymouth (plus one win in an Oldsmobile) before switching to a Hudson Hornet, at the suggestion of fellow driver Marshall Teague. Thomas won the Southern 500 rather handily in what was famously dubbed "the Fabulous Hudson Hornet", which would be the first of six wins in two months. His late charge helped him narrowly defeat Fonty Flock to win the Grand National championship. With help from crew chief Smokey Yunick, Thomas subsequently became the first owner/driver to take the championship in the process.

In 1952, Thomas and his Hornet were involved in a close championship race with another Flock, Fonty's younger brother Tim. The two drivers won eight races in their respective Hudsons, but Flock came out on top at the end, despite another late season charge from Thomas.

Thomas returned with a vengeance in 1953 and dominated the entire season, winning a series-best twelve races en route to becoming the first two-time series champion. Thomas won twelve races again in 1954, including a second Southern 500 win (making him the first driver to win twice at Darlington), but he was beaten by a more consistent Lee Petty in the championship standings.

After four successful years in a Hudson, Thomas began driving Chevrolets and Buicks in races in 1955. He crashed heavily behind the wheel of a Buick at a race in Charlotte, forcing him to miss three months of the season. He returned to score his third Southern 500 win in his Motoramic Chevy, one of three wins during the season. He finished 5th in the championship on the strength of his win at Darlington.

In 1956, Thomas briefly abandoned being an owner/driver and, after winning a race for himself early in the season, he drove for two other owners. He won once for Yunick, after which the two broke ties, and three consecutive races while driving Chryslers for Carl Kiekhaefer, then dominating NASCAR with the first professional team. Thomas eventually returned to being an owner/driver at season's end, and had clinched second behind Petty in the championship when he was severely injured at a race in Shelby, North Carolina. The wreck effectively ended his NASCAR career, though he had two starts in 1957 and one in 1962 without success. The three consecutive wins would end up being his final three wins.

== Career summary ==
Thomas ended his career with 48 victories, which currently ranks 17th all-time. He won 21.05% of his starts (48 wins out of 228 starts) during his career, which ranks as the highest win percentage all-time among drivers with 100 career starts.

== Family ==
Thomas' younger brother Donald made 79 starts in the Grand National division between 1950 and 1956, winning at Atlanta's Lakewood Speedway in 1952. Donald was the youngest driver to ever win a race in series history until Kyle Busch broke the record in 2005.

== Awards ==
Thomas was inducted into the International Motorsports Hall of Fame in 1994 and was named one of NASCAR's 50 Greatest Drivers in 1998.

Thomas was inducted into the NASCAR Hall of Fame on February 8, 2013.

Thomas was inducted into the Motorsports Hall of Fame of America in 2017.

Thomas and the Fabulous Hudson Hornet are on a historical mural on the side of a building at 133 N. Steele Street that was commissioned in 2016 by the City of Sanford.

== Death ==
On August 9, 2000, Thomas suffered a heart attack and died in Sanford, North Carolina.

== Pop culture impact ==
Thomas was one of the primary inspirations for the character of Doc Hudson in Pixar's Cars series of films. Many aspects of Doc's life were based on Thomas, as well as the design of the "Fabulous Hudson Hornet" car and racing livery.

== Motorsports career results ==
=== NASCAR ===
(key) (Bold – Pole position awarded by qualifying time. Italics – Pole position earned by points standings or practice time. * – Most laps led. ** – All laps led.)

==== Grand National Series ====
NASCAR Grand National Series results
Year	Team	No.	Make	1	2	3	4	5	6	7	8	9	10	11	12	13	14	15	16	17	18	19	20	21	22	23	24	25	26	27	28	29	30	31	32	33	34	35	36	37	38	39	40	41	42	43	44	45	46	47	48	49	50	51	52	53	54	55	56	NGNC	Pts	Ref
1949	Thomas Racing	93	Ford	CLT; 29																																																								25th	132	
1949	Thomas Racing	9	Ford		DAB; 12																																																							25th	132	
1949	Thomas Racing	92	Ford			HBO; 26	LAN	HAM	MAR	HEI	NWS; 5																																																	25th	132	
1950	Thomas Racing	92	Ford	DAB	CLT; 9	LAN; 23	MAR; 14	CAN																																																				11th	590.5	
1950	Thomas Racing	91	Plymouth						VER; 20	DSP																																																		11th	590.5	
1950	Thomas Racing	92	Plymouth								MCF; 21	CLT; 3	HBO; 8	DSP; 3	HAM	DAR; DNQ	LAN; 13	NWS; 4	VER; 11	MAR; 1*	WIN	HBO; 18																																						11th	590.5	
1951	Thomas Racing	92	Plymouth	DAB; 16	CLT; 4	NMO; 3	GAR	HBO; 7	ASF; 22	NWS; 13	MAR; 4	CAN; 4	CLS; 3	CLB; 4	DSP; 24	GAR	GRS; 11	BAI; 12		AWS; 3	MCF; 15	ALS; 2		FMS; 5	MOR; 29	ABS; 6			CCS; 1																															1st	4208.45	
1951	Hubert Westmoreland	41.5	Olds																HEI; 1*																																									1st	4208.45	
1951	Thomas Racing	92	Hudson																				MSF; 57				DAR; 1*	CLB; 20		LAN; 1	CLT; 1*	DSP	WIL; 14	**HBO**; 1	TPN; 26	PGS	**MAR**; 18	OAK	**NWS**; 21	**HMS**; 28																				1st	4208.45	
1951	Marshall Teague	9	Hudson																																						**JSP**; 1*	ATL; 19	GAR																	1st	4208.45	
1951	Leonard Tippett	99	Hudson																																									NMO; 21																1st	4208.45	
1952	Thomas Racing	92	Hudson	PBS	DAB; 2	JSP; 2	**NWS**; 1**	MAR; 8	CLB; 17	ATL; 8	CCS; 1	**LAN**; 21	DAR; 13	DSP; 6	CAN; 1	HAY	FMS; 21	HBO; 16	CLT; 1*	MSF; 3	**NIF**; 2	OSW; 2	MON; 2	MOR; 24	PPS; 18	MCF; 2	**AWS**; 3	DAR; 3	CCS; 2	**LAN**; 37	DSP; 5	**WIL**; 1	HBO; 27	MAR; 1		ATL; 13*	**PBS**; 1**																							2nd	6752.5	
1952	Thomas Racing	9	Hudson																																**NWS**; 1*																									2nd	6752.5	
1953	Thomas Racing	92	Hudson	PBS; 21	DAB; 4	**HAR**; 1**	**NWS**; 1	CLT; 12	RCH; 10	CCS; 2	LAN; 7	**CLB**; 8	**HCY**; 20	MAR; 2*	PMS; 1	RSP; 4	**LOU**; 3*	FIF; 1	LAN; 4	**TCS**; 1	WIL; 3	MCF; 2	PIF; 1*	**MOR**; 1*	**ATL**; 2	**RVS**; 1*	**LCF**; 2*	DAV; 1*	HBO; 2	AWS; 2	PAS; 1*	HCY; 2	DAR; 5	CCS; 6	**LAN**; 2	BLF; 1	**WIL**; 1**	NWS; 15	MAR; 26	ATL; 14*																				1st	8460	
1954	Thomas Racing	92	Hudson	PBS; 1	DAB; 59	JSP; 1*	ATL; 1	**OSP**; 10	OAK	NWS; 2	HBO; 1	CCS; 18	LAN; 1*	WIL; 10	MAR; 9	SHA; 10	**RSP**; 9	CLT; 10	GAR	CLB; 6	LND; 7	**HCY**; 1**	**MCF**; 2*	WGS; 1*	PIF; 1	**AWS**; 1	SFS; 2	**GRS**; 22	MOR; 2	OAK	CLT; 14	SAN; 6	COR; 4	DAR; 1	CCS; 20	CLT; 6	**LAN**; 1*	MAS; 4	MAR; 16	NWS; 3																				2nd	8366	
1955	Thomas Racing	92	Hudson	**TCS**; 3	PBS; 1*	JSP; 3		OSP; 4																									FOR; 21	CLT																										5th	5186	
1955	Thomas Racing	92	Packard				DAB; 36																																																					5th	5186	
1955	Thomas Racing	92	Chevy						CLB; 10	HBO; 16		MGY; 5																							MAS; 14		DAR; 1*	MGY; 2	LAN; 2	RSP; 2	GPS	MAS; 22	CLB; 3	MAR; 4	LVP	NWS; 21	HBO; 4													5th	5186	
1955	Arden Mounts	18	Hudson								NWS; 14																																																	5th	5186	
1955	Thomas Racing	92	Buick										LAN; 5	**CLT**; 21	HCY	ASF	TUS	MAR	RCH	NCF	FOR	LIN	MCF	FON	AIR	CLT	PIF	CLB	AWS	MOR	ALS	NYF				RSP; 1																								5th	5186	
1956	Thomas Racing	92	Chevy	HCY; 16	CLT; 11	WSS	PBS; 1	ASF; 9				ATL; 3	NWS; 4								MAR; 20												RSP; 4			CHI; 18	CCF; 8	MGY; 6	OKL; 4	ROA; 6	OBS; 7		NOR; 10	PIF; 4	MYB; 13		DAR; 49	CSH; 6	CLT; 5	LAN; 5	POR	CLB; 8	HBO; 4	NWP; 5	CLT; 7	CCF; 17	MAR	HCY	WIL	2nd	8568	
1956	Smokey Yunick	92	Chevy						DAB; 9	PBS; 3	**WIL**; 1																																																	2nd	8568	
1956	Carl Kiekhaefer	92	Chrysler											LAN; 2																																														2nd	8568	
1956	Carl Kiekhaefer	92	Dodge												RCH; 2																																													2nd	8568	
1956	Carl Kiekhaefer	501	Dodge													CLB; 6																																												2nd	8568	
1956	Carl Kiekhaefer	300B	Chrysler														CON; 3			HBO; 11				POR; 1	EUR; 1*	NYF	**MER**; 1				POR; 11	AWS; 5																												2nd	8568	
1956	Carl Kiekhaefer	901	Dodge															GPS; 14																																										2nd	8568	
1956	Carl Kiekhaefer	502	Dodge																HCY; 4			LIN; 4*	CLT					MAS; 7																																2nd	8568	
1956	Carl Kiekhaefer	500B	Dodge																										CLT; 6	MCF; 3																														2nd	8568	
1956	Carl Kiekhaefer	500D	Dodge																															PIF; 17	CSF																									2nd	8568	
1956	Jack Chatenay	30	Plymouth																																							SAN; 36																		2nd	8568	
1956	Thomas Racing	52N	Chevy																																											POR; 7														2nd	8568	
1957	Thomas Racing	92	Pontiac	WSS	CON	TIC	DAB	CON	WIL	HBO	AWS	NWS	LAN	CLT	PIF	GBF	POR	CCF	RCH	MAR	POR	EUR	LIN	LCS	ASP	NWP	CLB	CPS	PIF	JAC	RSP; 46	CLT	MAS	POR	HCY	NOR	LCS	GLN	KPC	LIN; 28	OBS	MYB	DAR	NYF	AWS	CSF	SCF	LAN	CLB	CCF	CLT	MAR	NBR	CON	NWS	GBF				NA	-	
1962	Stoney Johnson	91	Chevy	CON	AWS	DAY	DAY	DAY	CON	AWS	SVH	HBO	RCH	CLB	NWS; 14	GPS	MBS	MAR	BGS	BRI	RCH	HCY	CON	DAR	PIF	CLT	ATL	BGS	AUG	RCH	SBO	DAY	CLB	ASH	GPS	AUG	SVH	MBS	BRI	CHT	NSV	HUN	AWS	STR	BGS	PIF	VAL	DAR	HCY	RCH	DTS	AUG	MAR	NWS	CLT	ATL				97th	312	

Preceded by Bill Rexford	NASCAR Grand National Champion; 1951	Succeeded by Tim Flock
Preceded by Tim Flock	NASCAR Grand National Champion; 1953	Succeeded by Lee Petty
