= Johnny Mantz =

American racing driver (1918–1972)

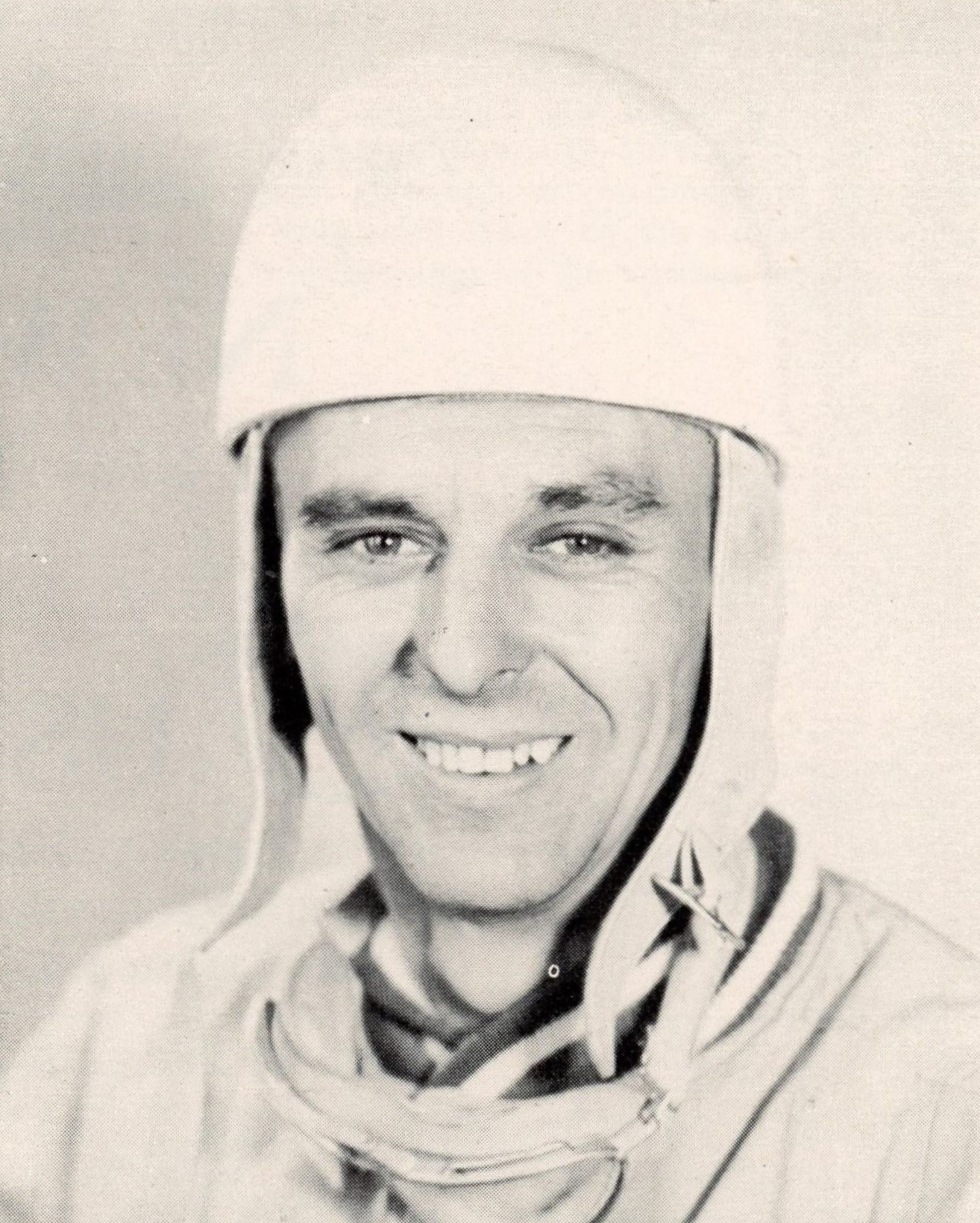
- Mantz, circa 1957
- Born: John Robert Mantz; September 18, 1918 Hebron, Indiana, U.S.
- Died: October 25, 1972 (aged 54) Ojai, California, U.S.

Championship titles
- USAC Stock Car (1956); Major victories Southern 500 (1950)

AAA/USAC Stock Car career
- Years active: 1952–1954, 1956–1959
- Championships: 1
- Best finish: 1st in 1956

NASCAR Cup Series career
- 12 races run over 4 years
- Best finish: 6th (1950)
- First race: 1950 Race 10 (Hillsboro)
- Last race: 1956 Race 3 (Lancaster)
- First win: 1950 Southern 500 (Darlington)
| Wins | Top tens | Poles |
|---|---|---|
| 1 | 8 | 0 |

Champ Car career
- 17 races run over 4 years
- Best finish: 9th (1949)
- First race: 1948 Indianapolis 500 (Indianapolis)
- Last race: 1952 Pikes Peak Hill Climb (Pikes Peak)
- First win: 1948 Milwaukee 100 (Milwaukee)
| Wins | Podiums | Poles |
|---|---|---|
| 1 | 2 | 1 |

Formula One World Championship career
- Active years: 1953
- Team: Kurtis Kraft
- Entries: 1
- Championships: 0
- Wins: 0
- Podiums: 0
- Career points: 0
- Pole positions: 0
- Fastest laps: 0
- First entry: 1953 Indianapolis 500

Johnny Mantz (September 18, 1918 – October 25, 1972) was an American racecar driver.

== Champ car ==
Mantz made 17 starts in the AAA Championship Car series from 1948 to 1952, capturing a victory in his rookie season at the Milwaukee Mile as well as winning the non-championship Indianapolis Sweepstakes at Williams Grove Speedway.

Mantz made two starts in the Indianapolis 500. They were 1948 and 1949. He started eighth in 1948 and finished a black-flagged 13th, completing 185 laps. In 1949, he started ninth and finished seventh, completing all 200 laps. In 1953, he drove relief for Walt Faulkner.

== Carrera Panamericana ==
Mantz was a member of the Lincoln team in the first Carrera Panamericana in Mexico in 1950. He and Bill Stroppe were able to lead quite a bit of the multi-day race. With the finish line in sight and no more spare tires to run, Mantz was forced to run on rims and limped across the finish line ending up ninth.

== Stock car ==
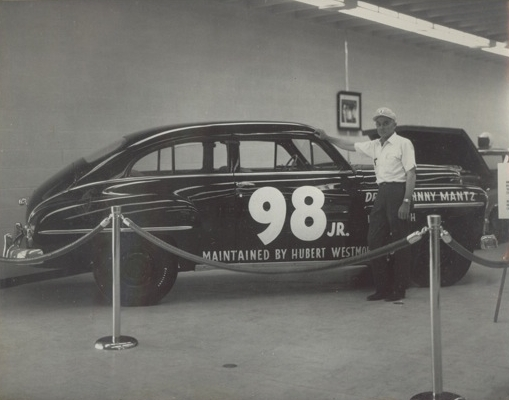
Mantz's Southern 500-winning Plymouth with car owner Hubert Westmoreland

Mantz was the first USAC Stock Car national champion in 1956. Mantz also made 12 NASCAR Grand National starts from 1950 to 1951 and 1955 to 1956. He won in his third NASCAR race, the first Southern 500 held at Darlington Raceway. This was the first 500-mile race in the history of NASCAR. The newly built Darlington Raceway was also the first "Super Speedway" for NASCAR, even though it was a little under a mile and a half in size. The Southern 500 was also the only paved event for NASCAR in 1950. Mantz and his Plymouth were the race's slowest qualifier, almost 10 MPH slower than the pole winner, Curtis Turner. But because he qualified on the ninth of fifteen days of time trials, he started 43rd in the 75 car field. Mantz fitted truck tires that did not wear quickly or blow out, while his competitors had to stop often to pit for new tires. It was his only NASCAR win. He would win by nine laps over the second-place finisher, Fireball Roberts, with an average speed of 75.250 mpg. The race took more than six hours to run. Other than the car number, Mantz had one lone sponsorship decal on his car which was placed by the Justice Brothers for the product they were distributing. Starting in 2010, the speedway presents the Johnny Mantz trophy to the winner of the Southern 500.

Mantz was also the first person to try to bring NASCAR sanctions to the West Coast of the United States. Mantz's last stock car race was in Pomona, California in 1958. He won this race.

== Ford Spokesperson ==
Mantz was featured in several magazine advertisements for Ford cars in the early 1960s.

== Death ==
Mantz died at 54 years old in a fatal car accident near Ojai, California.

== Complete AAA Championship Car results ==
| Year | 1 | 2 | 3 | 4 | 5 | 6 | 7 | 8 | 9 | 10 | 11 | 12 | 13 | 14 | Pos | Points |
|---|---|---|---|---|---|---|---|---|---|---|---|---|---|---|---|---|
| 1948 | ARL | INDY; 13 | MIL; 12 | LAN; 13 | MIL; 1 | SPR; 9 | MIL; 13 | DUQ | ATL | PIK | SPR; 9 | DUQ; 16 | | | 18th | 290 |
| 1949 | ARL; 3 | INDY; 7 | MIL; 5 | TRE; 12 | SPR; 8 | MIL; 17 | DUQ | PIK | SYR; 11 | DET; DNQ | SPR | LAN | SAC; DNS | DMR; 8 | 9th | 660 |
| 1950 | INDY; DNS | MIL | LAN | SPR | MIL | PIK | SYR | DET | SPR | SAC | PHX | BAY | DAR | | - | 0 |
| 1952 | INDY | MIL | RAL | SPR | MIL | DET | DUQ | PIK; 11 | SYR | DNC | SJS | PHX | | | 46th | 20 |
| 1953 | INDY; DNS | MIL | SPR | DET | SPR | MIL | DUQ | PIK | SYR | ISF | SAC | PHX | | | - | 0 |

== Indianapolis 500 results ==
| Year | Car | Start | Qual | Rank | Finish | Laps | Led | Retired |
|---|---|---|---|---|---|---|---|---|
| 1948 | 98 | 8 | 122.791 | 27 | 13 | 185 | 0 | Flagged |
| 1949 | 98 | 9 | 127.786 | 18 | 7 | 200 | 0 | Running |
| Totals | | | | | | 385 | 0 | |

| Starts | 2 |
| Poles | 0 |
| Front Row | 0 |
| Wins | 0 |
| Top 5 | 0 |
| Top 10 | 1 |
| Retired | 0 |

== World Championship career summary ==
The Indianapolis 500 was part of the FIA World Championship from 1950 through 1960. Drivers competing at Indy during those years were credited with World Championship points and participation. In the 1953 Indianapolis 500, Mantz drove in relief of Walt Faulkner. As a result of this shared ride, Mantz participated in one World Championship race, but he scored no World Championship points.

Sporting positions
| Preceded by Frank Mundy (AAA) | USAC Stock Car Champion; 1956 | Succeeded by Jerry Unser |
