= 1950 Southern 500 =

Auto race held at Darlington Raceway in 1950

Race details
- Race 13 of 19 in the 1950 NASCAR Grand National Series season
- Program promoting the 1950 Southern 500.
- Date: September 4, 1950
- Location: Darlington Raceway, Darlington, South Carolina
- Course: Permanent racing facility
- Course length: 1.25 miles (2.012 km)
- Distance: 400 laps, 500 mi (800 km)
- Weather: Very hot with temperatures of 90 °F (32 °C); wind speeds of 8.9 miles per hour (14.3 km/h)
- Average speed: 82.766 mph (133.199 km/h)
- Attendance: 25,000

Pole position
Driver	Curtis Turner	John Eanes
- Time: 43.884 seconds

Most laps led
Driver	Johnny Mantz	Hubert Westmoreland
- Laps: 351

Winner
No. 98	Johnny Mantz	Hubert Westmoreland

The inaugural Southern 500 was an automobile race held at Darlington Raceway in Darlington, South Carolina on September 4, 1950, as part of the 1950 NASCAR Grand National. While the 1950 race was co-sanctioned by NASCAR and its rival Central States Racing Association, all subsequent Southern 500 races were hosted exclusively by NASCAR.

Layout of Darlington Raceway.

It is NASCAR's first 500-mile race, and still holds status as one of NASCAR's premier events. Since there had never been a 500-mile stock car race and Darlington was NASCAR's first superspeedway, drivers and teams came to the event with unique strategies. Darlington set the precedent for race strategies to come at tracks like the Daytona International Speedway and Talladega Superspeedway.

== Background ==
The track at the time was a four-turn 1.25-mile (2.01 km) oval. The track's first two turns are banked at twenty-five degrees, while the final two are banked two degrees lower at twenty-three degrees. The front stretch (the location of the finish line) and the backstretch is banked at six degrees.

Harold Brasington was a retired racer in 1948, who had gotten to know Bill France Sr. while competing against France at the Daytona Beach and Road Course and other dirt tracks in the Southeast and Midwestern United States. He began planning a new speedway after he noticed the huge crowds while attending the 1948 Indianapolis 500 and thought, "If Tony Hulman can do it here, I can do it back home." Brasington bought 70 acres from farmer Sherman Ramsey and started making a race track from a cotton and peanut field. However, he was forced to create an egg-shaped oval with one corner tighter, narrower, and more steeply banked because he promised Ramsey that the new track would not disturb Ramsey's minnow pond at the west side of the property. Brasington was able to make the other turn at the east side of the property wide, sweeping, and flat as he wanted. It took almost a year to build the track.

== Race report ==
=== Historical information ===
The Interstate Highway System would not begin construction until later in the decade; its heyday and prominence as an "American superhighway" for leisure and business travel did not kick in until the late 1960s when NASCAR first felt the need to expand outside its regional "shell" and into the national stage.

=== Qualifying ===
More than 80 entrants showed up for the race. Brasington used a two-week qualifying scheme and arranged the 75 cars in three rows of 25, similar to the Indianapolis 500. During those two weeks of qualifications, locals could take their cars and try to qualify, unlike today where independent contract drivers used to run the races.

Drivers who failed to qualify for the race were Dorothy Shull, Bill Bennett, Lewis Hawkins, Pap White, Louise Smith, and Pat Sutton. The fastest qualifying speed was 82.034 miles per hour or 132.021 kilometres per hour by Wally Campbell, while the slowest was 74.637 miles per hour or 120.117 kilometres per hour by Bill Widenhouse. Herb Thomas did qualify for the race beforehand; the car was on the grid until just before the race when it was repossessed, counting as an automatic withdrawal for Thomas.

Pee Wee Martin and Bob Smith retired from professional stock car racing after this event. Byron Beatty, Walt Crawford, P.E. Godfrey, Bill Henson, Pete Keller, Jerry Kempf, Lee Morgan, Dick Soper, and Jack Yardley made their only NASCAR start in this event. Weldon Adams, Roy Bentley, Jack Carr, Gene Comstock, Gene Darragh, John DuBoise, Carson Dyer, Joe Eubanks, Johnny Grubb, J.E. Hardie, Tex Keene, Bub King, Virgil Livengood, Hub McBride, Hershel McGriff, Bill Osborne, Barney Smith, Rollin Smith, Jesse James Taylor, Charles Tidwell, Murrace Walker, Bill Widenhouse and Shorty York began their NASCAR career at this race and established the first generation of stock car drivers.

=== Analysis ===
U.S. Senator Strom Thurmond was the official marshal for the 1950 Southern 500.

The top prize for the race was $10,510 ($140,642 when adjusted for inflation) while the lowest prize was $100 ($1,338 when adjusted for inflation) for 72nd-75th place. Seventy-five cars competed in this era of relatively unregulated racing for a total of $25,325 in winnings ($338,893 when adjusted for inflation). For that ear, it was considered remarkable that there were more than 50 cars out of the 75 starters still running on lap 300 of 400.

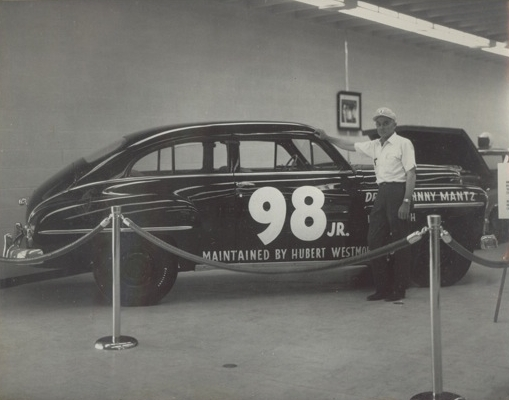
Johnny Mantz's winning Plymouth with car owner Hubert Westmoreland

Gober Sosebee led the first four laps. Curtis Turner, the polesitter, then led until lap 22 before being wrecked out of the race on lap 275 with a significant amount of roof damage. After Turner lost the lead, Cotton Owens lead for 23 laps. After that, Mantz led to the finish. Mantz had taken advantage of an offer from Firestone to test a tire designed for asphalt stock car racing. While some cars used over 60 tires to go the remainder of the race, Mantz kept increasing his lead and won by over nine laps. The total time of the race was 6 hours, 38 minutes, and 40 seconds. The average speed was 75.250 mph (121.103 km/h) while the pole position speed was 82.034 mph (132.021 km/h). Two cautions lasted thirteen laps. Four hundred laps were done spanning 1.250 mi (2.012 km). Most of the known DNFs in the race were caused by crashes, the worst of which involved drivers Tex Keene, Curtis Turner, and Jack Smith all rolling their cars over the course of the race.

For the average car in the race, the tire load unleashed on the tires on the new, paved circuit was too much on the tires, whether it was a Firestone or a random dirt tire. A legend spread around that teams were so desperate to get new tires that they would steal the tires from parking lots and the infield from the spectators. The race is considered to be the first "tire disaster" in NASCAR history, with the next major tire disaster being the 1969 Talladega 500.

== Results ==
=== Finishing order ===
Section reference:

Pos	St	No.	Driver	Car	Laps	Money	Status	Led
1	43	98	Johnny Mantz	'50 Plymouth	400	10510	running	351
2	67	82	Fireball Roberts	'50 Oldsmobile	391	3500	running	0
3	7	22	Red Byron	'50 Cadillac	390	2000	running	0
4	23	59	Bill Rexford	'50 Oldsmobile	385	1500	running	0
5	15	77	Chuck Mahoney	'50 Mercury	381	1000	running	0
6	35	42	Lee Petty	'49 Plymouth	380	800	running	0
7	38	71	Cotton Owens	'50 Plymouth	380	930	running	23
8	64	2	Bill Blair	'49 Cadillac	375	600	running	0
9	44	52	Hershel McGriff	'50 Oldsmobile	374	500	running	0
10	26	61	George Hartley	'50 Oldsmobile	371	450	running	0
11	16	9	Tim Flock	'50 Oldsmobile	370	400	running	0
12	57	44	Johnny Grubb	'50 Plymouth	368	350	running	0
13	62	26	Dick Linder	'50 Oldsmobile	367	300	running	0
14	68	89	John DuBoise	'50 Ford	367	250	running	0
15	72	72	Weldon Adams	'49 Plymouth	367	225	running	0
16	32	99	Barney Smith	'50 Oldsmobile	366	275	running	0
17	3	51	Gober Sosebee	'50 Oldsmobile	364	290	running	4
18	52	39	Elmer Wilson	'49 Plymouth	360	100	running	0
19	21	4	Joe Eubanks	'50 Mercury	359		running	0
20	19	43	Shorty York	'50 Buick	358		running	0
21	51	64	Walt Crawford	'50 Buick	358		running	0
22	33		Murrace Walker	'50 Oldsmobile	358		running	0
23	48		Gene Comstock	'50 Oldsmobile	355			0
24	27	17	Jack White	'50 Ford	354			0
25	71	65	Byron Beatty	'50 Ford	351			0
26	53		Bill Widenhouse	'49 Plymouth	350			0
27	4	7	Bob Flock	'50 Oldsmobile	348		running	0
28	10	47	Fonty Flock	'50 Oldsmobile	346			0
29	13	19	Jack Smith	'50 Oldsmobile	345		crash	0
30	30	34	Pee Wee Martin	'50 Oldsmobile	344	100	overheating	0
31	5	5	Lee Morgan	'49 Oldsmobile	342		running	0
32	8		Hub McBride	'50 Mercury	341			0
33	11		Slick Smith	'50 Oldsmobile	340			0
34	12	45	Ted Chamberlain	'50 Plymouth	338		running	0
35	6	66	Virgil Livengood	'50 Oldsmobile	338		running	0
36	9		Billy Carden	'50 Ford	338		running	0
37	14	37	Bill Snowden	'50 Nash	338		running	0
38	22	21	Harold Kite	'49 Lincoln	334			0
39	25	49	Glenn Dunaway	'50 Lincoln	333			0
40	2	25	Jimmy Thompson	'50 Lincoln	332	125	engine	0
41	65	27	Jimmy Florian	'50 Ford	331		spindle	0
42	20	35	Bob Smith	'50 Oldsmobile	331		running	0
43	24	0	Jimmie Lewallen	'50 Oldsmobile	330			0
44	75		Jesse James Taylor	'50 Mercury	329			0
45	29		Bub King	'50 Mercury	329			0
46	36	24	Gene Darragh	'50 Hudson	323			0
47	39		Roy Bentley	'50 Studebaker	319			0
48	42		J. E. Hardie	'50 Studebaker	317			0
49	34		Jerry Kempf	'50 Lincoln	315			0
50	46	36	Bill Osborne	'50 Mercury	311	100		0
51	37		Carson Dyer	'50 Lincoln	310			0
52	60	33	Wally Campbell	'50 Oldsmobile	309	100		0
53	40	79	Jim Paschal	'50 Ford	307			0
54	45	18	Charles Tidwell	'49 Oldsmobile	300	100		0
55	41		Ruel Smith	'50 Pontiac	289			0
56	47		Al Keller	'50 Oldsmobile	284			0
57	50		Dick Soper	'50 Kaiser	282			0
58	54		Pete Keller	'50 Studebaker	281			0
59	56		P. E. Godfrey	'49 Lincoln	278			0
60	1	41	Curtis Turner	'50 Oldsmobile	275	320	crash	22
61	49		Bob Apperson	'49 Oldsmobile	249			0
62	55		Tommy Thompson	'50 Hudson	238			0
63	61	6	Marshall Teague	'50 Lincoln	230			0
64	70	14	Tex Keene	'50 Plymouth	229		crash	0
65	31	38	Clyde Minter	'50 Lincoln	219	100		0
66	74		Rollin Smith	'50 Hudson	208			0
67	17	86	Bill Henson	'49 Oldsmobile	200	100		0
68	50	48	Gayle Warren	'49 Oldsmobile	188	100		0
69	28	87	Buck Baker	'49 Oldsmobile	176		crash	0
70	58	46	Kenneth Wagner	'49 Lincoln	155	100		0
71	18	62	Lloyd Moore	'50 Lincoln	112	100		0
72	73	48	Alton Haddock	'50 Ford	98	100		0
73	69	54	Jack Yardley	'50 Ford	89			0
74	66		Jack Carr	'50 Mercury	52		engine	0
75	63		Roscoe Thompson	'49 Oldsmobile	24		overheating	0
Failed to qualify, withdrew, or driver change
Pos	Name	No.	Car					
	Bill Bennett		Kaiser					
	Lewis Hawkins		Plymouth					
	Dorothy Shull		Oldsmobile					
	Pap White		Mercury					
	Pat Sutton	54	Ford					
	Louise Smith	94	Nash					
WD	Herb Thomas	92	Plymouth					

=== Timeline ===
Section reference:

- Start of race: Gober Sosebee officially started the race with the pole position.
- Lap 5: Curtis Turner took over the lead from Gober Sosebee.
- Lap 24: Roscoe Thompson overheated his vehicle, making him the last-place finisher.
- Lap 27: Cotton Owens took over the lead from Curtis Turner.
- Lap 50: Johnny Mantz took over the lead from Cotton Owens.
- Lap 52: Jack Carr's vehicle overheated while he was racing.
- Lap 89: Jack Yardley failed to finish the race.
- Lap 98: Alton Haddock failed to finish the race.
- Lap 112: Lloyd Moore failed to finish the race.
- Lap 155: Kenneth Wagner failed to finish the race.
- Lap 176: Buck Baker had a terminal crash, forcing him to retire from the event.
- Lap 188: Gayle Warner failed to finish the race.
- Lap 200: Bill Henson failed to finish the race.
- Lap 208: Rollin Smith failed to finish the race.
- Lap 219: Clyde Minter failed to finish the race.
- Lap 229: Tex Keene had a terminal crash, forcing him to retire from the event.
- Lap 230: Marshall Teague failed to finish the race.
- Lap 238: Tommy Thompson failed to finish the race.
- Lap 249: Bob Apperson failed to finish the race.
- Lap 278: P.E. Godfrey failed to finish the race.
- Lap 281: Pete Keller failed to finish the race.
- Lap 282: Dick Soper failed to finish the race.
- Lap 284: Al Keller failed to finish the race.
- Lap 320: Curtis Turner had a terminal crash after leading 22 laps, forcing him to retire from the event.
- Lap 331: Jimmy Florian had a problem with his vehicle's spindle, knocking him out of the race.
- Lap 332: Jimmy Thompson managed to overheat his vehicle's engine.
- Lap 333: Glenn Dunaway finished well behind the lead lap drivers, his standing wasn't fully recorded.
- Lap 334: Harold Kite finished well behind the lead lap drivers, his standing wasn't fully recorded.
- Lap 340: Slick Smith finished well behind the lead lap drivers, his standing wasn't fully recorded.
- Lap 341: Hub McBride finished well behind the lead lap drivers, his standing wasn't fully recorded.
- Lap 344: Pee Wee Martin managed to overheat his vehicle while he was racing.
- Lap 345: Jack Smith had a terminal crash, forcing him to retire from the event.
- Lap 346: Fonty Flock finished well behind the lead lap drivers, his standing wasn't fully recorded.
- Lap 350: Bill Widenhouse finished well behind the lead lap drivers, his standing wasn't fully recorded.
- Lap 351: Byron Beaty finished well behind the lead lap drivers, his standing wasn't fully recorded.
- Lap 354: Jack White finished well behind the lead lap drivers, his standing wasn't fully recorded.
- Lap 355: Gene Comstock finished well behind the lead lap drivers, his standing wasn't fully recorded.
- Finish: Johnny Mantz was officially declared the winner of the event.

Preceded by none	Southern 500 races 1950	Succeeded by 1951
