= Dick Linder =

American racing driver (1923–1959

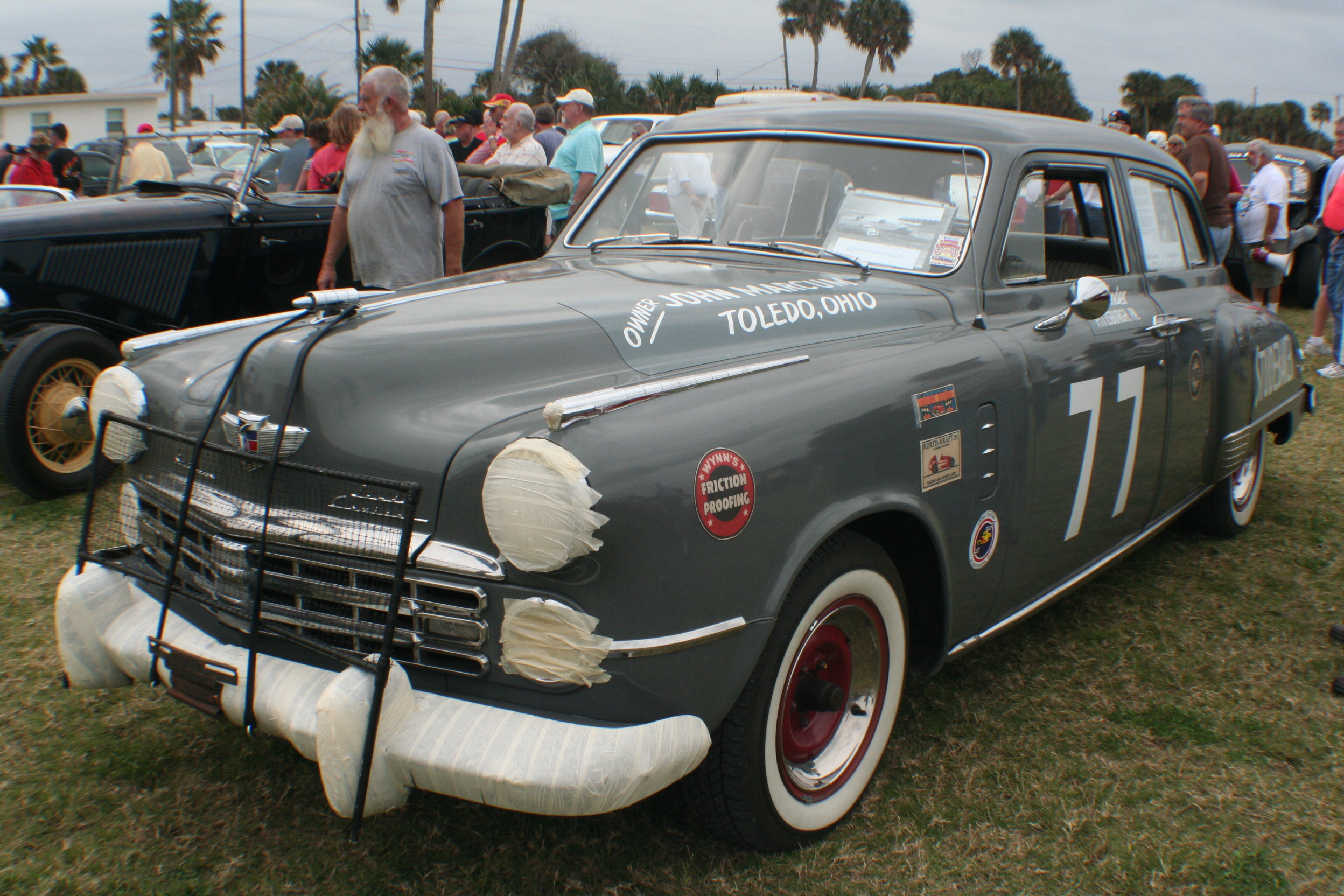
- Linder's 1951 Studebaker
- Born: Richard Linder; April 6, 1923; Pittsburgh, Pennsylvania, U.S.
- Died: April 19, 1959 (aged 36); Trenton, New Jersey, U.S.
- Cause of death: Injuries from racing accident

NASCAR Cup Series career
- 28 races run over 5 years
- Best finish: 8th (1950)
- First race: 1949 Race 4 (Langhorne)
- Last race: 1956 Race 6 (Daytona Beach)
- First win: 1950 Race 11 (Dayton)
- Last win: 1950 Race 16 (Vernon)
Wins	Top tens	Poles
3	11	5

Richard Refeld Linder (April 6, 1923 – April 19, 1959) was an American professional race car driver from Pittsburgh, Pennsylvania.

== Career ==
Linder raced USAC open wheel as well as NASCAR stock cars. Between 1949 and 1956, he entered 28 NASCAR events, winning three with eight additional top-ten finishes. Linder's three wins came behind the wheel of his Oldsmobile; Dayton, OH 8/20/1950, Hamburg, NY 8/27/1950, and Vernon, NY 10/1/1950. His final NASCAR race was the 1956 Beach Course event at Daytona. He raced there several times including an 18th-place finish in 1951. Linder recorded over 110 victories at various Pennsylvania race tracks. He and his brother Gus Linder are members of The Pittsburgh Circle Track Club Hall of Fame.

== Death ==
During a USAC Champ Car event at Trenton Speedway in April 1959, Linder tried to avoid hitting Don Branson, who was spinning in front of him. His racer crashed through the guard rail and rolled over once, landing on its wheels. Linder, who was 36 years old, died of a broken neck.

Linder's Vargo Special was the same car in which Van Johnson would be killed a few months, Hugh Randall a few years later.
