= 1950 Wilkes 200 =

NASCAR race from 1950

Race details
- Race 15 of 19 in the 1950 NASCAR Grand National Series season
- North Wilkesboro Speedway
- Date: September 24, 1950
- Official name: Wilkes 200
- Location: North Wilkesboro Speedway, North Wilkesboro, North Carolina
- Course: Permanent racing facility
- Course length: 0.625 miles (1.006 km)
- Distance: 200 laps, 100 mi (150 km)
- Weather: Mild with temperatures approaching 70 °F (21 °C); with winds being sustained up to 12 miles per hour (19 km/h)
- Average speed: not recorded
- Attendance: 7,000

Pole position
Driver	Fireball Roberts	Sam Rice

Most laps led
Driver	Fonty Flock	Frank Christian
- Laps: 104

Winner
No. 11	Leon Sales	Hubert Westmoreland

Television in the United States
- Network: untelevised
- Announcers: none

The 1950 Wilkes 200 was a NASCAR Grand National Series event that was held on September 24, 1950, at North Wilkesboro Speedway in North Wilkesboro, North Carolina.

Due to the mostly informal nature of the NASCAR organization during the early 1950s, certain records like the number of laps completed under a caution flag and the amount of time it took to complete the race were never placed in the league's archives. Lee Petty, Lloyd Moore and Dick Linder mathematically eliminated themselves from the championship by not taking part in this race.

== Summary ==
Fireball Roberts acquired the pole position while driving speeds up to 73.266 miles per hour (117.910 km/h) during the qualifying sessions. However, on the first lap of the race, he was passed by Red Byron. Three laps later, Fonty Flock took over the lead, and would eventually lead over 104 laps before being sidelined with a blown engine. Byron took the lead back, and would lead 30 more laps, but he was sidelined with a broken spindle. Jack Smith would inherit the lead, but with eight laps to go, Leon Sales, in his first start, took over the lead, and would defeat Jack Smith by an unknown margin of victory. Sales would qualify in eleventh place for this racing event. Seven thousand people would watch this race that took place on a dirt track spanning 0.625 miles or 1.006 kilometres.

All 26 drivers on the starting grid were born in the United States of America; no foreign drivers made the grid. Most of the DNFs in the race were caused by wheel and engine problems; although two drivers were taken out the race due to a crash and a troublesome spindle. Other notable drivers in this race were Billy Carden, future 1955 Southern 500 winner Herb Thomas and Curtis Turner.

The lowest paid driver got $50 in winnings ($669.09 when adjusted for inflation) while the winner received $1,000 in total prize money ($13,381.74 when adjusted for inflation). NASCAR would offer a total purse of $3,900 for this racing event ($52,188.8 when adjusted for inflation). The oldest car in the race was a 1947 Buick which was one of the models manufactured shortly after the end of World War II. Most of drivers on the field were driving 1950 model year vehicles with no entries from the Chevrolet manufacturer until later in the decade. Even a Cadillac vehicle made an entry in the race. This was the first race of the Grand National series to not have at least one Ford in the field.

Oldsmobile drivers would use the Oldsmobile 88 as their vehicle for this event.

=== Debuts and retirements ===
Herbert Burns, Leon Sales, Ewell Weddle, and Jerry Wimbish would introduce themselves to the NASCAR scene during this race while Jack Carr and Tex Keene would retire from NASCAR after this race.

=== Results ===
Pos	Grid	Car #	Driver	Owner	Make	Laps	Laps led	Status	Winnings
1	11	98	Leon Sales	Hubert Westmoreland	'50 Plymouth	200	8	Running	$1000
2	13		Jack Smith	Bishop Brothers	'50 Plymouth		55	Running	$750
3		78	Ewell Weddle	Ewell Weddle	'49 Lincoln		0	Running	$500
4	5	92	Herb Thomas	Herb Thomas	'50 Plymouth		0	Running	$400
5	14	44	Gayle Warren	Earl Blevins	'50 Plymouth		0	Running	$300
6	16	52	Weldon Adams	Weldon Adams	'50 Plymouth		0		$200
7	15		Jimmy Thompson	Leland Colvin	'50 Plymouth		0		$150
8	6		Jerry Wimbish	Jerry Wimbish	'50 Oldsmobile		0		$125
9	7	7	Bob Flock	Frank Christian	'50 Oldsmobile		0		$100
10		94	Herbert Burns		'49 Lincoln		0		$75
11		2	Bill Blair	Sam Rice	'50 Oldsmobile		0		$50
12		21	Harold Kite	Harold Kite	'50 Mercury		0		$50
13	8	12	Billy Carden	Bishop Brothers	'50 Oldsmobile		0		$50
14	9	87	Buck Baker	Bob Griffin	'50 Oldsmobile		0		$50
15	10	38	Clyde Minter	Clyde Minter	'47 Buick		0	Wheel	$50
16	1	82	Fireball Roberts	Sam Rice	'49 Oldsmobile		0	Engine	$50
17		15	Paul Parks		'50 Plymouth		0		
18	3	47	Fonty Flock	Frank Christian	'50 Oldsmobile		104	Engine	
19	2	22	Red Byron	Raymond Parks	'50 Cadillac		33	Spindle	
20	17	37	Slick Smith	Nash Motor Co.	'50 Nash		0	Crash	
21			Dick Shuebruk		'49 Lincoln		0		
22	4	41	Curtis Turner	John Eanes	'50 Oldsmobile		0		
23		58	Jim V. Cook		'50 Mercury		0	Engine	
24	12	75	Tim Flock	Frank Christian	'50 Oldsmobile		0		
25			Jack Carr		'50 Oldsmobile		0		
26	18	14	Tex Keene	Tex Keene	'50 Plymouth		0		

==== Race summary ====
- Lead changes: 5
- Cautions: N/A
- Red flags: N/A
- Time of race: N/A
- Average speed: N/A
- Margin of Victory: N/A

== Timeline ==
Section reference:

Red Byron
Fonty Flock
Red Byron
Jack Smith
Leon Sales
│
0
│
10
│
20
│
30
│
40
│
50
│
60
│
70
│
80
│
90
│
100
│
110
│
120
│
130
│
140
│
150
│
160
│
170
│
180
│
190
│
200
