= Lloyd Moore =

American racing driver

- Born: Lloyd David Moore; June 8, 1912; Frewsburg, New York, U.S.
- Died: May 18, 2008 (aged 95)

NASCAR Cup Series career
- 49 races run over 5 years
- Best finish: 4th - 1950
- First race: 1949 (Pittsburgh)
- Last race: 1955 Southern 500 (Darlington)
- First win: 1950 (Winchester)
Wins	Top tens	Poles
1	23	0

Lloyd David Moore (June 8, 1912 – May 18, 2008) was a NASCAR Grand National Series driver from 1949 to 1955, recording one win, 13 top-five and 23 top-ten finishes. He was born in Frewsburg, New York, USA. At the time of his death, he was the oldest living former NASCAR driver.

In 1950, Moore was a teammate of NASCAR champion Bill Rexford under car owner Julian Buesink. He was the winner of one Grand National Series race that season, at the dirt half mile Winchester Speedway in Winchester, Indiana. He finished fourth in points for the season.

Moore was honored by his hometown of Frewsburg in March 2009 with a street named in his honor.
