= Canfield Speedway =

Motorsport track in Ohio, United States

Coordinates: 41°0′36″N 80°45′13″W

Canfield Fairgrounds Speedway
- Location: Canfield Township, Mahoning County, Ohio, at 7265 Columbiana-Canfield Road, Canfield Fairgrounds, Ohio 44406
- Capacity: 40,000+
- Owner: The Mahoning County Agricultural Society
- Operator: The Canfield Fairgrounds
- Broke ground: 194?
- Opened: 1949
- Closed: 1973 to autos
- Construction cost: $?
- Architect: Mahoning County Agricultural Society
- Former names: Canfield Fairgrounds Speedway
- Major events: NASCAR Grand National Series The Poor Man's 500

Oval
- Surface: Dirt
- Length: 0.500 mi (.805 km)
- Turns: 4
- Banking: 15° Turns; 8° Front Stretch; 12° Back straightaway
- Race lap record: 58.102mph (time N/A) (Bill Rexford, Julian Buesink, 1951, NASCAR Grand National Series)

Oval
- Surface: Dirt
- Length: 0.2501 mi (.4025 km)
- Turns: 4
- Banking: 5° in turns 0° in straights
- Race lap record: 0:15.210 (Iggy Katona, Iggy Katona, 1951, NASCAR Short Track Series)

Oval
- Surface: Asphalt
- Length: 0.2501 mi (.4025 km)
- Turns: 4
- Banking: 8° in turns 5° in straights
- Race lap record: 0:14.046 (Mike Klapak, Mike Klapak, 1964, ARCA)

Oval
- Surface: Dirt
- Length: 0.500 mi (.805 km)
- Turns: 4
- Banking: 10° in turns 5° in straights
- Race lap record: 0:14.046 (Harold Smith, Harold Smith, 1961, ARCA)

Canfield Speedway is a half mile dirt oval racetrack that hosted (major) sanctioned auto racing from 1950 to 1964, but other associations ran until the late 1970s. There was also a 1/4 mile dirt racing surface that shared the front stretch with the 1/2 mile track. It was used until the track was closed to auto racing in 1973. Attendance varied from 30,000 people for larger events to 10,000 people for ones of less significance. The track is located at the Canfield Fairgrounds in Canfield, Ohio, and is still in use today, primarily during the Canfield Fair.

== History ==
The original promoter of auto racing in Canfield was Charlie Findlay and then his nephew George C. Findlay in the early 1960s. It was Charlie that had close ties with Johnny Marcum, (MARC) Midwest Association of Racing Cars and Canfield Speedway was the priority track. In 1964 ARCA took over MARC as the desire for dirt tracks died out.

== Races ==
It was on the NASCAR Grand National Schedule for three years from 1950 to 1952 hosting one event annually over that time period. The NASCAR Grand National and Short Track series competed there as well as ARCA and USAC. The Grand National events were 200 laps and 100 miles (160 km) long. The Short Track Race was 100 laps and the track was 1/4-mile long making the race 25 miles (40 km). The ARCA races were either 100 laps on the 1/4-mile or 200, 250, or 300 laps on the 1/2-mile as the track had two different configurations. Some of the events used the inverted start with the pole qualifier starting last. Both USAC races were 100 laps on the quarter mile configuration.

== Records ==
The quickest laps recorded in sanctioned events were just under the 24 second mark with cars averaging 60 mph (97 km/h) around the speedway on the half mile configuration. On the quarter mile quick time was under 16 seconds and cars averaged 55 mph (89 km/h). The NASCAR pole record is 54.233 mph (87.280 km/h) and the race record is 48.057 mph 2:04:51. The record for cautions is 4 and smallest margin of victory 4 feet (1.2 m) and the largest 3 laps. The largest purse was $4350 and the most lead changes was 2.

== Table of NASCAR Sanctioned Events ==
Date	Event name	Series	Race winner	Pole
May 30, 1950	(none)	NASCAR Grand National	Bill Rexford	Jimmy Florian
May 30, 1951	Poor Man's 500	NASCAR Grand National Series	Marshall Teague	Bill Rexford
September 27, 1951	-----	NASCAR Short Track	Lloyd Moore	Iggy Katona
May 30, 1952	Poor Man's 500	NASCAR Grand National	Herb Thomas	Dick Rathmann

== Table of ARCA & USAC Events ==
Date	Series	Winner
May 30, 1953	ARCA Stock Car	Jim Romine
August 8, 1953	ARCA Stock Car	Jim Romine
May 31, 1954	ARCA Stock Car	Buckie Sager
June 26, 1954	ARCA Stock Car	Bob Pronger
July 17, 1954	ARCA Stock Car	Don Oldenberg
August 7, 1954	ARCA Stock Car	Russ Hepler
April 23, 1955	ARCA Stock Car	Jim Romine
May 30, 1955	ARCA Stock Car	Jim Romine
June 25, 1955	ARCA Stock Car	Russ Hepler
July 30, 1955	ARCA Stock Car	Bill Lutz
August 20, 1955	ARCA Stock Car	Jim Romine
September 17, 1955	ARCA Stock Car	Mike Klapak
October 1, 1955	ARCA Stock Car	Jim Romine
May 30, 1956	ARCA Stock Car	Darel Dieringer
June 23, 1956	ARCA Stock Car	Russ Hepler
July 14, 1956	ARCA Stock Car	Jack Farris
August 11, 1956	ARCA Stock Car	Jim Romine
September 22, 1956	ARCA Stock Car	Bob James
April 20, 1957	ARCA Stock Car	Jack Farris
April 27, 1957	ARCA Stock Car	Iggy Katona
May 30, 1957	ARCA Stock Car	Jack Farris
July 4, 1957	ARCA Stock Car	Jack Farris
July 27, 1957	ARCA Stock Car	Bob James
August 17, 1957	ARCA Stock Car	Nelson Stacy
September 21, 1957	ARCA Stock Car	Roy Gemberling
April 26, 1958	ARCA Stock Car	Bob James
May 30, 1958	ARCA Stock Car	Les Snow
June 24, 1958	ARCA Stock Car	Bob James
July 4, 1958	ARCA Stock Car	Bob James
April 25, 1959	ARCA Stock Car	Nelson Stacy
May 30, 1959	ARCA Stock Car	Don White
July 4, 1959	ARCA Stock Car	Bill Forney
August 1, 1959	ARCA Stock Car	Bob James
August 14, 1959	USAC Midget	Eddie Johnson
September 26, 1959	ARCA Stock Car	Bob James
July 2, 1960	ARCA Stock Car	Paul Parks
July 30, 1960	ARCA Stock Car	Nelson Stacy
August 3, 1960	USAC Midget	Bob McLean
September 18, 1960	ARCA Stock Car	Nelson Stacy
May 30, 1961	ARCA Stock Car	Harold Smith
September 17, 1961	ARCA Stock Car	Kenny Reeder
April 21, 1962	ARCA Stock Car	Dick Freeman
May 30, 1962	ARCA Stock Car	Harold Smith
May 30, 1963	ARCA Stock Car	Jack Bowsher
May 29, 1964	ARCA Stock Car	Earl Balmer

== 1950 Race #5 Top 5 Results for First Race ==
1. Bill Rexford	200 Laps	$1,470	80 Led
2. Glenn Dunaway	198	$750	
3. Lloyd Moore	198	$500	
4. Lee Petty	195	$400	
5. Bill Blair	195	$300	

== Bill Rexford ==
Bill Rexford won the inaugural event (later known as the Poor Man's 500) and went on to take the Grand National Championship that year in 1950. He was the youngest diver to win the championship in what is now the NASCAR Cup Series. He was aided to the championship when Lee Petty was stripped of some points for racing in non-NASCAR sanctioned events. His only lead lap finish in his career was at Canfield Speedway (when he won). His only career pole came at Canfield Speedway the following year in 1951. He was the 1st of 6 drivers to win a championship without winning a pole in that season. He is 1 of 4 drivers to win a championship with only 1 win that season (nobody has won with 0 wins). In the three grand national races only 4 cars combined finished on the lead lap.
