= Asheville–Weaverville Speedway =

Former raceway

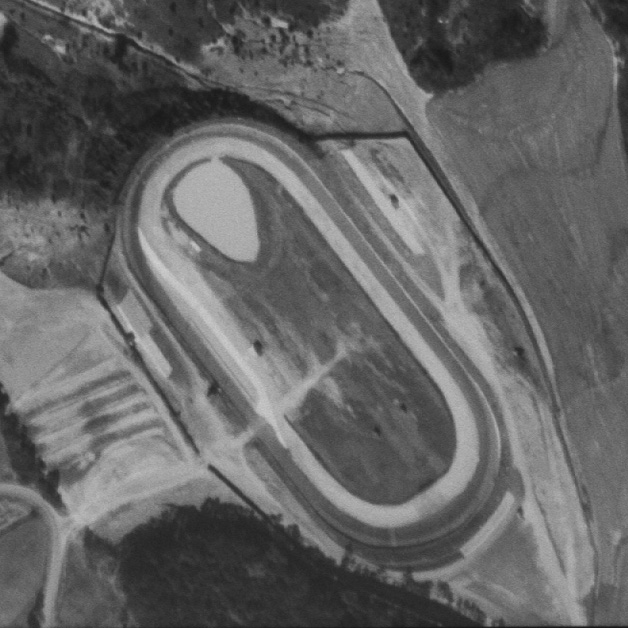
- Asheville-Weaverville Speedway (1964)
- Location: 890 Clarks Chapel Rd Weaverville, NC 28787
- Coordinates: 35.738671°N 82.558649°W
- Capacity: over 7,000
- Opened: August 20, 1950
- Closed: 1969
- Major events: Grand National Series

Oval
- Surface: Dirt (1950–1957); Asphalt (1957–1969)
- Length: 0.50 mi (0.8 km)

The Asheville–Weaverville Speedway was a half-mile oval racetrack near Weaverville, North Carolina, that hosted 34 races in NASCAR's top division, then called the Grand National Series, between 1951 and 1969. Winners at the track included Richard Petty, Lee Petty, Rex White, Fonty Flock, Bob Flock, and Fireball Roberts. The site is now occupied by North Buncombe High School.

== History ==
Local businessman Gene Sluder built the track on his property north of Weaverville after NASCAR founder Bill France visited an airfield Sluder had built there in 1949 and suggested he add a racetrack beside it. Sluder graded a half-mile dirt oval with 25-degree banking in each of its four turns. The track was billed as the fastest half-mile in the nation, and it opened on August 20, 1950. It held its first Grand National race on July 29, 1951, when Fonty Flock won before a crowd of more than 8,000. Spectators could park above the backstretch and watch from their cars, and some called it the "world's first drive-in speedway." The track was paved in 1957, and Sluder added lights for night racing in 1959. The annual Western North Carolina 500 often drew around 10,000 fans.

Besides its winners, drivers who raced at the track included Banjo Matthews and Junior Johnson, as well as Ralph Earnhardt and Cotton Owens.

Sluder handed management of the track to the Land of Sky Racing Corporation in 1966. The final race was the Western North Carolina 500 on August 24, 1969. The property was auctioned in November 1971 to Raymond Parks of Atlanta, and in April 1974 the Buncombe County Board of Education bought the 100-acre tract for $115,000 as the site of a new North Buncombe High School. The board found the track easy to convert into an athletic field and the 1959 lights still in good condition. The school's football field now sits where the track was.

In the 1970s and 1980s the track was used as softball fields and sports practice fields. The track itself had been disabled by first placing earthen barriers on opposite sides of the track, and later, concrete barriers at 8 locations around the track.

== Winners of the circuit ==
Winners of Grand National races at the track, by NASCAR season. The second race of the 1962 season was held on November 12, 1961.

Year	Winner	Manufacturer
1951	Fonty Flock	Oldsmobile
1952	Bob Flock	Hudson
1953	Fonty Flock	Hudson
1954	Herb Thomas	Hudson
1955	Tim Flock	Chrysler
1956	Lee Petty	Dodge
1957	Buck Baker	Chevrolet
1957	Lee Petty	Oldsmobile
1958	Rex White	Chevrolet
1958	Fireball Roberts	Chevrolet
1959	Rex White	Chevrolet
1959	Bob Welborn	Chevrolet
1959	Lee Petty	Plymouth
1960	Lee Petty	Plymouth
1960	Rex White	Chevrolet
1961	Rex White	Chevrolet
1961	Junior Johnson	Pontiac
1962	Rex White	Chevrolet
1962	Joe Weatherly	Pontiac
1962	Jim Paschal	Plymouth
1963	Richard Petty	Plymouth
1963	Fred Lorenzen	Ford
1964	Marvin Panch	Ford
1964	Ned Jarrett	Ford
1965	Ned Jarrett	Ford
1965	Richard Petty	Plymouth
1966	Richard Petty	Plymouth
1966	Darel Dieringer	Mercury
1967	Richard Petty	Plymouth
1967	Bobby Allison	Ford
1968	David Pearson	Ford
1968	David Pearson	Ford
1969	Bobby Isaac	Dodge
1969	Bobby Isaac	Dodge

=== Convertible Division ===
Winners of NASCAR Convertible Division races at the track.

Year	Winner	Manufacturer
1956	Curtis Turner	Ford
1957	Bob Welborn	Chevrolet
1958	Bob Welborn	Chevrolet
1959	Bob Welborn	Chevrolet

== New Asheville Speedway ==
The Asheville–Weaverville Speedway is not to be confused with the New Asheville Speedway, a 1/3 mi (0.54 km) oval on Amboy Road in Asheville, about 12 miles south of the Asheville–Weaverville Speedway. Built in 1960, it ran until 1999. The environmental nonprofit RiverLink bought that track, then known as the Asheville Motor Speedway, in 1998 and turned it into Carrier Park. The asphalt oval was kept as part of the park and is now used as a bicycle track.

The track's owner sold the property partly to avoid trouble with a strengthened city noise ordinance. About a month after the land was transferred to the city in October 1998, supporters delivered a petition with more than 20,000 signatures asking for one last season of racing.
