= Palm Beach Speedway =

Former motor sports racing venue

Coordinates: 26.6811°N 80.1893°W

Palm Beach Speedway was a motor sports racing venue located in West Palm Beach, Florida. The speedway hosted a total of 7 NASCAR races between January 20, 1952 and December 11, 1956. Dick Rathman had the most poles at 3, and Herb Thomas captured the most wins with 4. The half mile dirt oval was built in 1949, paved in 1955 and torn down in 1984.

Palm Beach Speedway's inaugural NASCAR race was also the season opener for the Grand National 1952 season. Six Thousand fans gathered for the 100 mile event, and looked on as Tim Flock started on the pole, and reached the checkered flag ahead of 26 other drivers. Flock captured his 9th career win driving a Hudson Hornet owned by Ted Chester. Lee Petty finished second and Tim's brother Fonty Flock finished third. Pancho Alverez was driving a 1951 Olds 88, but was catapulted into the air landing on the roof to flatten the car. Fans cheered when Alverez crawled out uninjured.

The final NASCAR race at the track came on March 4, 1956, as Billy Meyer taking the final checkered flag. The 100 mile event was marked by a disqualification which would play a part in final finishing order. Al Keller beat Billy Meyer to the checkered flag, but was found to running with modified pistons, and Meyer was awarded the victory. Buck Baker and Herb Thomas grabbed the second and third spots respectively.

Also known as

- West Palm Beach Speedway
- West Palm Beach Fairgrounds
- South Florida Fairgrounds Speedway
- Palm Beach County Fairgrounds
- Southland Speedway
