= Dayton Speedway =

Motorsport track in the United States

- Location: Dayton, Ohio, United States
- Coordinates: 39°43′26″N 84°15′25″W

Oval

Dayton Speedway was a race track in Dayton, Ohio, United States. It has been called the "Fastest 1/2 mile (plus 210 feet) in the world".

The track held events for NASCAR, AAA, MARC, ARCA, ASA, and USAC.

== History ==
The track was opened in June 1934 as a flat "D shaped" 5/8 mile dirt track. The original track was a "copy" of the Legion Ascot Speedway.

Timeline - The following is a timeline of events from 1933 to the present:

- 1933 - A "Kids Race" was held in September 1933.
- 1934 - The Official opening of the track was Sunday, June 3, 1934.

The first race was won by Ken Fowler of Paterson, New Jersey. Future Indy 500 winner Mauri Rose of Dayton was second.

- 1934-1935 - The Speedway Manager was Paul Ackerman.
- 1936 - On June 4, 1936, the entire track was repaved with asphalt and promised to be the fastest track of its design in the world.
- 1937 - Track was purchased by Frank Funk.
- 1939 - The track was converted to a high-banked 1/2 mile.

Funk also raised the banking, twice.
May have buried old Trolley cars to help fill the space.
Added an "oil substance" that "made the track as hard as pavement" (on hot days the stuff would get soapy and rain over the cars and drivers).

- late 1930s - 1970 - Covered grandstands were added.
- 1940s - Billboards on the backstretch began to be displayed.
- 1941-1945 - Closed during WWII.
- 1946 - Reopened after World War II on Friday, June 29, 1946, with the first "Big Car" race ever held

at night on the East Coast (Ascot was first in the world).

- 1947-1954 - The track infield was 1/4 mile.
- 1949 - Sold in 1949.
- 1949-1958 - It had a single white guardrail.
- 1949?-1954? - The track had a wooden scoring / announcers stand.
- 1950 - It had a single "Strap" Guardrail (from 1950 Sprint Car Start on Home Page).
- 1951/52 - Track was converted to (corrugated/extruded) rounded guardrails.
- 1952 - Sprint car driver Gordon Reid was killed in a gruesome crash on the frontstretch that also killed three spectators and injured many others.
- Later that year, Jim Rigsby was killed when his car made contact with another car and was launched off the turn 3 banking over 20 feet in the air, landing in a cabbage field 200 feet from the track.
- 1953 - First Dayton 500 was won by Iggy Katona.
- 1954 - Track site was used for a concert by "The Drifters" on August 7, 1954.
- 1955 - The infield track was 3/8 mile.
- 1955 - Jim Romine Olds photo shows bridge (No bridge after 1955?)
- 1960s - Harlan Fengler era (chief steward of the Indy 500)

He removed 6 feet off the banked turns.
For 3 years, Earl Baltes ran the track (and several other tracks until 1979).

- 1969 - Black and white stripes were used on the guardrails.

Infield scoring stand was built (Benny Parsons Photo).

- 1970 - Covered grandstands in photos.
- 1971-1974 - Closed but the track was used for testing.
- 1975 - A new grandstand was built with new owner

Black and gold stripes were on the guardrails.

- 1976-1978 - Closed but the track was used for testing.
- 1979 - Don Thompson era.

Red-white-blue trim was applied to guardrails.
Track re-named "Greater Dayton Speedway" and was painted on infield scorers stand.
The surface was repaved twice.

- 1982 - Front of the Concession Stand near turn one nearly collapsed between races one Sunday.

Guardrails and restrooms were in disrepair.

- 1982 - Closed at the end of season due to no liability insurance.
- 1984 - Still for sale.

Guardrails needed to be replaced.
Grandstands needed repair.
One groove left in turns 1+2 and huge potholes in 3+4.
Straights were surprisingly good but banking needed attention.

- 1986 - Still for sale.

The Flagman stand floor had rusted out.
The top section of infield scoring stand was gone.
Scales were gone from in front of infield scoring stand.

- 1986-1994 - The track began use as a landfill, eventually refuse filled the infield to the pavement on the straights. The site was then filled with clay and the track no longer exists.
