= Billy Rafter =

American racing driver (1929–2026)

- Born: William F. Rafter; July 31, 1929 Clarence Center, New York, U.S.
- Died: March 2, 2026 (aged 96)
- Retired: 1972

Motorsport career
- Debut season: 1949
- Car number: 22

Championship titles
- 1959 NASCAR NY Sportsman Champion; 1959 New York State Fair Champion

NASCAR Cup Series career
- 35 races run over 6 years
- Best finish: 19th (1958)
- First race: 1949 Hamburg NY
- Last race: 1958 Rochester NY
Wins	Top tens	Poles
0	11	0

William F. Rafter (July 31, 1929 – March 2, 2026) was an American champion stock car driver from Clarence Center, New York and a pioneer of the sport.

== Racing career ==
Rafter began his racing career in 1948 as a teenager at the Civic Stadium in Buffalo, New York, and was soon hired by local car dealer John Moran to drive his highly-modified ’37 Ford coupe.

Rafter made 35 appearances in the NASCAR Grand National Series, the first of which was in 1949, the inaugural year of the Cup division. He otherwise spent the majority of his career racing in the Late Model Sportsman and Modified divisions, competing at the renowned tracks of the northeast, including Fonda Speedway and Perry Speedway in New York and Langhorne Speedway in Pennsylvania. In 1961, he won the inaugural event at the newly opened Utica-Rome Speedway in Vernon, New York.

Rafter claimed track titles at Civic Stadium, Lancaster Speedway and Holland Speedway in New York, as well as Merrittville Speedway in Thorold, Ontario. He was inducted into the New York State Stock Car Association and the Northeast Dirt Modified Halls of Fame.

== Death ==
Rafter died March 2, 2026, at the age of 96.

== Motorsports career results ==
=== NASCAR ===
(key) (Bold – Pole position awarded by qualifying time. Italics – Pole position earned by points standings or practice time. * – Most laps led.)

==== Grand National Series ====
NASCAR Grand National Series results
Year	Team	No.	Make	1	2	3	4	5	6	7	8	9	10	11	12	13	14	15	16	17	18	19	20	21	22	23	24	25	26	27	28	29	30	31	32	33	34	35	36	37	38	39	40	41	42	43	44	45	46	47	48	49	50	51	52	53	54	55	56	NGNC	Pts	Ref
1949			Ford	CLT	DAB	HBO	LAN	HAM; 3	MAR	HEI	NWS																																																	20th	160	
1953			Plymouth	PBS	DAB	HAR	NWS	CLT	RCH	CCS	LAN	CLB	HCY	MAR	PMS	RSP	LOU	FFS	LAN	TCS	WIL	MCF; 18	PIF	MOR	ATL	RVS	LCF	DAV	HBO	AWS	PAS	HCY	DAR	CCS	LAN	BLF	WIL	NWS	MAR	ATL																				146th	64	
1954	Billy Rafter	141	Plymouth	PBS	DAB; 42	JSP	ATL	OSP	OAK	NWS	HBO	CCS	LAN	WIL	MAR	SHA	RSP	CLT	GAR	CLB	LND	HCY	MCF	WGS	PIF	AWS	SFS	GRS	MOR	OAK	CLT	SAN	COR	DAR	CCS	CLT	LAN	MAS	MAR	NWS																				201st	14	
1956	Billy Rafter	41	Dodge	HCY	CLT	WSS	PBS	ASF	DAB	PBS	WIL	ATL	NWS	LAN	RCH	CLB	CON	GPS	HCY	HBO	MAR	LIN	CLT	POR	EUR	NYF; 19	MER	MAS	CLT	MCF; 15	POR	AWS; 7	RSP	PIF	CSF	CHI	CCF	MGY	OKL	ROA	OBS	SAN	NOR; 13	PIF; 11	MYB	POR	DAR	CSH	CLT; 17	LAN	POR	CLB	HBO	NWP; 22	CLT	CCF; 26	MAR; 26	HCY	WIL	73rd	623.4	
1957	C.M. Julian	41	Dodge	WSS	CON	TIC	DAB	CON	WIL	HBO	AWS	NWS	LAN	CLT	PIF	GBF	POR	CCF	RCH	MAR	POR	EUR	LIN	LCS	ASP	NWP	CLB	CPS	PIF	JAC	RSP	CLT	MAS; 17	POR	HCY	NOR	LCS	GLN; 10	KPC																					99th	128	
1957	Billy Rafter	41	Dodge																																					LIN; 23	OBS	MYB	DAR																	99th	128	
1957	Billy Rafter	4	Plymouth																																									NYF; 24	AWS	CSF	SCF	LAN	CLB	CCF	CLT	MAR	NBR	CON	NWS	GBF				99th	128	
1958	Billy Rafter	150	Ford	FAY	DAB	CON	FAY	WIL	HBO	FAY; 11																																																		19th	2916	
1958	Billy Rafter	50	Ford								CLB; 32	PIF; 10	ATL; 15	CLT; 8																																														19th	2916	
1958	Billy Rafter	57	Ford												MAR; 18	ODS	OBS	GPS; 8	GBF; 8	STR; 11	NWS	BGS	TRN	RSD	CLB	NBS; 5	REF; 14	LIN; 8	HCY; 11	AWS; 13		MCC; 11	SLS	TOR; 6	BUF; 9	MCF; 12	BEL	BRR	CLB	NSV	AWS	BGS	MBS	DAR	CLT	BIR	CSF	GAF	RCH	HBO	SAS	MAR	NWS	ATL						19th	2916	
1958	Billy Rafter	57	Chevy																												RSP; 24																													19th	2916	
