= Bob Cameron (racing driver) =

American racing driver (1927–1960)

- Born: Robert G. Cameron; December 18, 1927 Kenmore, New York, U.S.
- Died: June 4, 1960 (aged 32) Lancaster, New York, U.S.

Championship titles
- 1949 NASCAR NY Modified Champion

NASCAR Cup Series career
- 2 races run over 2 years
- Best finish: 64th (1949)
- First race: 1949 Hamburg, New York
- Last race: 1953 Rochester, New York
Wins	Top tens	Poles
0	1	0

Robert Cameron (December 18, 1927 – June 4, 1960) was an American stock car racing driver. He was a pioneer of the sport, competing in the inaugural year of the Strictly Stock division, which is now the NASCAR Cup Series.

== Racing career ==
Cameron made two appearances in the NASCAR Grand National Series, with a best finish of sixth. He spent the majority of his career racing in the Modified division competing at the renowned tracks of New York, including Brewerton Speedway Monroe County Fairgrounds, Oswego Speedway, Vernon Fairgrounds and Weedsport Speedway. Cameron was the victor at the inaugural event at Spencer Speedway in Williamson.

Cameron lost his life in a racing accident at the Lancaster Speedway on June 4, 1960.

Cameron was inducted into the Northeast Dirt Modified Hall of Fame in 2023.

== Motorsports career results ==
=== NASCAR ===
(key) (Bold – Pole position awarded by qualifying time. Italics – Pole position earned by points standings or practice time. * – Most laps led.)

==== Grand National Series ====
NASCAR Grand National Series results
Year	Team	No.	Make	1	2	3	4	5	6	7	8	9	10	11	12	13	14	15	16	17	18	19	20	21	22	23	24	25	26	27	28	29	30	31	32	33	34	35	36	37	NGNC	Pts	Ref
1949	-	-	-	CLT	DAB	HBO	LAN	HAM; 14	MAR	HEI	NWS																														108th	-	
1953	-	-	Plymouth	PBS	DAB	HAR	NWS	CLT	RCH	CCS	LAN	CLB	HCY	MAR	PMS	RSP	LOU	FIF	LAN	TCS	WIL	MCF; 6	PIF	MOR	ATL	RVS	LCF	DAV	HBO	AWS	PAS	HCY	DAR	CCS	LAN	BLF	WIL	NWS	MAR	ATL	-	-	
