= Jim Delaney (racing driver) =

American racing driver

- Born: James W. Delaney; December 18, 1928 Hope, New Jersey, U.S.
- Died: April 5, 1991 (aged 62) Supply, North Carolina, U.S.

Modified racing career
- Debut season: 1949
- Finished last season: 1961

Championship titles
- 1952,1958,1959 Langhorne National Open

NASCAR Cup Series career
- 11 races run over 4 years
- Best finish: 47th (1950)
- First race: 1948 Langhorne, Pennsylvania
- Last race: 1957 Daytona Beach, Florida
Wins	Top tens	Poles
0	3	0

James W. Delaney (December 18, 1928 – April 5, 1991) was an American stock car racing driver and crew chief. He was a pioneer of the sport, competing in the inaugural year of the Strictly Stock division, which is now the NASCAR Cup Series.

== Racing career ==
Delaney got behind the wheel for the first time in 1948, at age 19, racing on the New Jersey and Pennsylvania short tracks at Dover, Hinchcliffe Stadium and Nazareth Speedway in a stock car he built himself. He made 11 appearances in the NASCAR Grand National Series, with a best finish of fifth. He spent the majority of his career racing in the Sportsman and Modified divisions, competing at the renowned tracks of the northeast, including Flemington Speedway and Wall Stadium in New Jersey; Langhorne Speedway, Pennsylvania; and Orange County Fair Speedway in Middletown, New York.

Delaney gained recognition as a respected fabricator and mechanic and, after he retired from driving, became a mainstay in the NASCAR garage area. Delaney served stints as crew chief for Tiny Lund, Billy Wade and NASCAR Hall of Fame champion Joe Weatherly.

Delaney was inducted into the Northeast Dirt Modified Hall of Fame in 2015.

== Motorsports career results ==
=== NASCAR ===
(key) (Bold – Pole position awarded by qualifying time. Italics – Pole position earned by points standings or practice time. * – Most laps led.)

==== Grand National Series ====
NASCAR Grand National Series results
Year	Team	No.	Make	1	2	3	4	5	6	7	8	9	10	11	12	13	14	15	16	17	18	19	20	21	22	23	24	25	26	27	28	29	30	31	32	33	34	35	36	37	38	39	40	41	42	43	44	45	46	47	48	49	50	51	52	53	NGNC	Pts	Ref
1949	-	11	Ford	CLT	DAB	HBO	LAN; 40	HAM	MAR	HEI	NWS																																														108th	-	
1950	-	99	Plymouth	DAB	CLT	LAN	MAR	CAN	VER	DSP	MCF	CLT	HBO	DSP	HAM	DAR	LAN	NWS	VER; 14	MAR	WIN	HBO; 8																																			47th	114	
1951	Bob Osiecki	26	Ford	DAB	CLT	NMO	GAR	HBO	ASF	NWS	MAR	CAN; 16	CLS	CLB	DSP	GAR	GRS	BAI	HEI	AWS																																					64th	144.5	
1951	Bob Osiecki	21	Mercury																		MCF; 24	ALS	MSF	FMS																																	64th	144.5	
1951	Bob Osiecki	21	Ford																						MOR; 5	ABS; 14	DAR; 53	CLB	CCS	LAN	CLT	DSP; 18	WIL	HBO																							64th	144.5	
1951	Bob Osiecki	21	Plymouth																																TPN; 10	PGS	MAR	OAK	NWS	HMS	JSP	ATL	GAR	NMO													64th	144.5	
1957	Tom Harbison	36	Plymouth	WSS	CON	TIC	DAB; 20	CON	WIL	HBO	AWS	NWS	LAN	CLT	PIF	GBF	POR	CCF	RCH	MAR	POR	EUR	LIN	LCS	ASP	NWP	CLB	CPS	PIF	JAC	RSP	CLT	MAS	POR	HCY	NOR	LCS	GLN	KPC	LIN	OBS	MYB	DAR	NYF	AWS	CSF	SCF	LAN	CLB	CCF	CLT	MAR	NBR	CON	NWS	GBF	-	-	
