= Frankie Schneider =

American racing driver

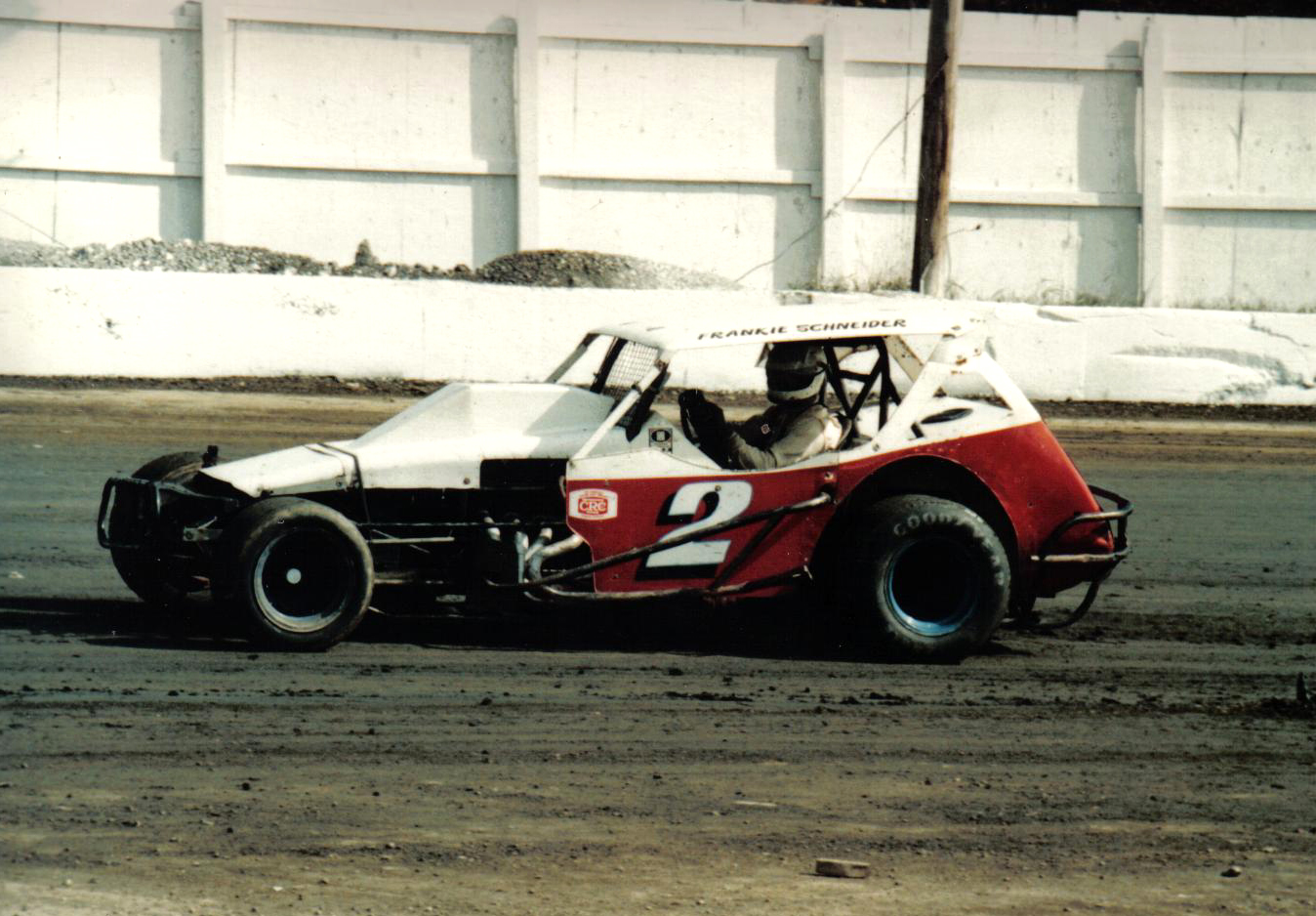
- Born: August 11, 1926 Maplewood, New Jersey, U.S.
- Died: November 12, 2018 (aged 92)

Motorsport career
- Debut season: 1947
- Car number: 2
- Wins: 750+
- Finished last season: 1999

Championship titles
- 1952 NASCAR National Modified champion 1954,1962 Langhorne National Open; 1967 All Star Stock Car Racing League Champion

NASCAR Cup Series career
- 27 races run over 7 years
- Best finish: 20th (1957)
- First race: 1949 Hamburg Speedway
- Last race: 1958 Starkey Speedway
- First win: 1958 Old Dominion Speedway
Wins	Top tens	Poles
1	16	1

Frank E. Schneider (August 11, 1926 – November 11, 2018) was an American stock car, modified, midget, and sprint car racer. He had one NASCAR Grand National Series victory at Old Dominion Speedway in 1958 driving a 1957 Chevrolet. He also won the 1952 NASCAR modified title, where it is suspected that he scored at least 100 wins. Schneider earned his nickname "The Old Master" for his ability to master anything with wheels.

== Early life ==
Frank E. Schneider was born on August 11, 1926 in Maplewood, New Jersey. His father, Frank Sr, was employed at Western Electric in Newark at the time. Frank was the oldest of five children, Eleanor, Lorraine, Robert, and Charles are his younger siblings. He left home when he was 16 and he started racing cars when he was 21.

== Racing career ==
Schneider began his career on June 15, 1947, by winning $70 ($1,009.31 when considering inflation) for driving his streetcar to a seventh-place at Flemington Speedway. Schneider is believed to have won at least 750 races in the next thirty years including a NASCAR Cup race at Old Dominion Speedway in Virginia. He routinely raced in several classes at eight races per week. He reportedly scored at least 100 wins again in 1958. Schneider won the Langhorne National Open, the country's top event for Sportsman and Modified racers in 1954 and 1962. In 1963, he won four track points championships—Middletown, Harmony, Reading, and Nazareth—in a car he bought for $1,000 ($10,516.3 when considering inflation).

Schneider scored his last feature win on July 31, 1977, at the 1/2-mile dirt track Nazareth Speedway. Although he competed in almost all 50 states, the Bahamas, and Canada, Schneider raced most of his career at the Orange County Fair Speedway in Middletown, New York; Reading Fairgrounds Speedway and Nazareth Speedway in Pennsylvania; and Flemington Speedway and Harmony Speedway in New Jersey. The Northeast Dirt Modified Hall of Fame inducted Schneider in 1992 as part of its inaugural class. He was recently voted driver of the century by Area Auto Racing News.

Schneider's career is the subject of the video "The Old Master: Frankie Schneider". Schneider died at the age of 92 on November 11, 2018.

== Motorsports career results ==
=== NASCAR ===
(key) (Bold – Pole position awarded by qualifying time. Italics – Pole position earned by points standings or practice time. * – Most laps led.)

==== Grand National Series ====
NASCAR Grand National Series results
Year	Team	No.	Make	1	2	3	4	5	6	7	8	9	10	11	12	13	14	15	16	17	18	19	20	21	22	23	24	25	26	27	28	29	30	31	32	33	34	35	36	37	38	39	40	41	42	43	44	45	46	47	48	49	50	51	52	53	NGNC	Pts	Ref
1949	Frankie Schneider	-	Ford	CLT	DAB	HBO	LAN	HAM; 6	MAR	HEI	NWS																																														26th	100	
1950	–	–	-	DAB	CLT	LAN	MAR	CAN	VER	DSP	MCF	CLT	HBO	DSP	HAM; 11	DAR	LAN	NWS	VER	MAR	WIN	HBO																																			80th	-	
1951	–	–	-	DAB	CLT	NMO	GAR	HBO	ASF	NWS	MAR	CAN	CLS	CLB	DSP	GAR	GRS	BAI	HEI	AWS	MCF	ALS	MSF	FMS	MOR; 37	ABS	DAR	CLB	CCS	LAN	CLT	DSP	WIL	HBO	TPN	PGS	MAR	OAK	NWS	HMS	JSP	ATL	GAR	NMO															
1952	Clark-Warwick	88	Oldsmobile	PBS; 4	DAB; 11	JSP; 3	NWS; 18	MAR; 9	CLB; 4	ATL	CCS	LAN	DAR	DSP	CAN	HAY	FMS	HBO	CLT	MSF	NIF	OSW	MON	MOR	PPS	MCF	AWS	DAR	CCS	LAN	DSP	WIL	HBO	MAR	NWS	ATL	PBS																				37th	931	
1953	-	8	Jaguar	PBS	DAB	HAR	NWS	CLT	RCH	CCS	LAN	CLB	HCY	MAR	PMS	RSP	LOU	FIF	LAN; 12	TCS	WIL	MCF	PIF	MOR	ATL	RVS	LCF	DAV	HBO	AWS	PAS	HCY	DAR	CCS	LAN	BLF	WIL	NWS	MAR	ATL																			
1957	Hugh Babb	45	Chevy	WSS	CON	TIC	DAB; 40	CON	WIL	HBO	AWS	NWS	LAN	CLT	PIF	GBF	POR	CCF	RCH; 4	MAR	POR	EUR	LIN	LCS	ASP	NWP	CLB	CPS	PIF	JAC																											20th	2516	
1957	Hubert Westmoreland	44	Chevy																												**RSP**; 2	CLT	MAS	POR	HCY	NOR	LCS																				20th	2516	
1957	Hubert Westmoreland	2	Chevy																																			GLN; 4	KPC	LIN; 7	OBS; 9	MYB															20th	2516	
1957	Frankie Schneider	62	Chevy																																								DAR; 47	NYF	AWS; 8	CSF	SCF	LAN; 11	CLB	CCF	CLT	MAR; 24	NBR	CON	NWS	GBF	20th	2516	
1958	Hubert Westmoreland	2	Chevy	FAY	DAB; 29	CON																																																			-	-	
1958	Frankie Schneider	62	Chevy				FAY; 4	WIL	HBO	FAY; 2	CLB	PIF	ATL	CLT	MAR; 27	ODS; 1*	OBS; 4	GPS	GBF	STR; 4	NWS	BGS	TRN	RSD	CLB	NBS	REF	LIN	HCY	AWS	RSP	MCC	SLS	TOR	BUF	MCF	BEL	BRR	CLB	NSV	AWS	BGS	MBS	DAR	CLT	BIR	CSF	GAF	RCH	HBO	SAS	MAR	NWS	ATL			-	-	
