= Louise Smith =

American racing driver (1916–2006)

- Born: July 31, 1916; Barnesville, Georgia, U.S.
- Died: April 15, 2006 (aged 89)
- Awards: International Motorsports Hall of Fame (1999) Member of the "Living Legends" Racing Club in Daytona Beach; Member of "The Old Timer's" Racing Club in Archdale, North Carolina Georgia Automobile Racing Hall of Fame

NASCAR Cup Series career
- 11 races run over 3 years
- Best finish: 63rd (1949)
- First race: 1949 (Daytona Beach)
- Last race: 1952 (Morristown)
Wins	Top tens	Poles
0	0	0

Louise Smith (July 31, 1916 – April 15, 2006) was tied for the second woman to race in NASCAR at the top level. She was known as "the first lady of racing."

Smith went as a spectator to her first NASCAR race at the Daytona Beach Road Course in 1949. She could not stand watching the races, so she entered her family's shiny new Ford coupe in the race and rolled it. Her hometown Greenville, South Carolina paper featured photos of the wreck, and the town knew about it before she got home. The race was the first race to feature three female drivers (Ethel Mobley and Sara Christian). The trio also competed later that season at the Langley Speedway.

Smith raced from 1949 to 1956. She won 38 races in her career in numerous formats: late models, modifieds (28 victories), midgets, and sportsman.

== Car owner ==
Smith returned in 1971 as a car owner for numerous drivers. She sponsored Ronnie Thomas' Rookie of the Year attempt in 1978.

== Award ==
Smith became the first woman inducted into the International Motorsports Hall of Fame in 1999.

== Motorsports career results ==
=== NASCAR ===
(key) (Bold – Pole position awarded by qualifying time. Italics – Pole position earned by points standings or practice time. * – Most laps led.)

==== Grand National Series ====
NASCAR Grand National Series results
Year	Team	No.	Make	1	2	3	4	5	6	7	8	9	10	11	12	13	14	15	16	17	18	19	20	21	22	23	24	25	26	27	28	29	30	31	32	33	34	NGNC	Pts
1949	Louise Smith	94	Ford	CLT	DAB; 20	HBO; 27	LAN; 16	HAM	MAR	HEI	NWS																											63rd	4
1950	Louise Smith	94	Ford	DAB; 41	CLT	LAN; 21	MAR	CAN	VER	DAY	MCF	CLT	HBO																									109th	-
1950	Louise Smith	94	Nash											DAY; 19	HAM; 22	DAR; DNQ	LAN	NWS	VER	MAR	WIN	HBO; 19																109th	-
1952	Louise Smith		Olds	PBS	DAB	JSP	NWS	MAR	CLB	ATL	CCS; 26	LAN; 24	DAR	DAY	CAN	HAY	FMS	HBO	CLT	MSF	NIF	OSW	MON	MOR; 30	PPS	MCF	AWS	DAR	CCS	LAN	DAY	WIL	HBO	MAR	NWS	ATL	PBS	173rd	-

== Bibliography ==
- Fearless: The Story of Racing Legend Louise Smith (Dutton Books for Children) by Barb Rosenstock, 2010.
