= Bob Flock =

American racing driver (1918–1964)

- Born: Robert Newman Flock; April 16, 1918; Fort Payne, Alabama, U.S.
- Died: May 16, 1964 (aged 46); Atlanta, Georgia, U.S.
- Achievements: Won the pole for NASCAR's first sanctioned race (Charlotte, 1949); First NASCAR driver to win a race from the pole (Hillsboro, 1949)
- Awards: Georgia Automobile Racing Hall of Fame (2003); National Motorsports Press Association Hall of Fame (1981)

NASCAR Cup Series career
- 36 races run over 7 years
- Best finish: 3rd (1949)
- First race: 1949 Race No. 1 (Charlotte)
- Last race: 1956 (LeHi)
- First win: 1949 (Hillsboro)
- Last win: 1952 (Weaverville)
Wins	Top tens	Poles
4	18	3

NASCAR Convertible Division career
- 1 race run over 1 year
- First race: 1956 Race #6 (Montgomery)
Wins	Top tens	Poles
0	0	1
- Statistics up to date as of August 11, 2025.

Robert Newman Flock (April 16, 1918 – May 16, 1964) was an American stock car racer. He qualified on the pole position for NASCAR's first Strictly Stock (now NASCAR Cup Series) race and, along with Red Byron, is considered one of the two best drivers from that era. Flock died of a heart attack in 1964.

== Racing career ==
Flock was a well-established driver before NASCAR was formed. He took over NASCAR founder Bill France Sr.'s ride in 1946. He won both events at the Daytona Beach Road Course in 1947. Flock was known for his daring driving style. For example, during a race on June 15, 1947, Flock overturned his car in an accident. Instead of accepting a DNF, he solicited help from spectators, who turned the car back on its wheels, and he finished the race: "Like other wrecks it wasn’t anywhere near as serious, and folks flipped Flock’s car over on its wheels." In an October 1947 race at Piedmont Interstate Fairgrounds, he suffered a crushed vertebra when his tire blew, sending his car through the track fencing and into a light pole.

Flock sat on the pole for NASCAR's first race at Charlotte Speedway on June 19, 1949, setting a qualifying time of 38.37 seconds. He had two wins that season, and finished third in the points behind Lee Petty and champion Red Byron.

Flock was the only winner of a Cup Series race held at the mysterious Air Base Speedway in Greenville, South Carolina in 1951 on August 25. His brothers, Tim and Fonty also took part in the event. The track was closed in 1952 after only three years of racing but was still visible by 1964 and only partially by 1976.

Flock won two 100 lap ARCA races at Lakewood Speedway in 1954.

Flock retired from driving when he broke his back in an on-track accident. He had over 200 modified wins in his career.

Flock competed in one NASCAR Convertible Division event, at Montgomery Motor Speedway, he started on pole position but finished 20th after having a broken axle.

== Track promoter ==
Flock became a track promoter in Atlanta. He hired three women (Sara Christian, and Mildred Williams, and his sister Ethel Mobley) to race at his new track.

== Personal life ==
Flock was the brother of NASCAR pioneers Tim Flock and Fonty Flock, and the second female NASCAR driver Ethel Mobley. The four raced at the July 10, 1949 race at the Daytona Beach Road Course, which was the first event to feature a brother and a sister, and the only NASCAR event to feature four siblings. Ethel beat Fonty and Bob by finishing in eleventh.

=== Moonshine business ===
The Flock family had an illegal moonshine business. The federal agents discovered that Flock would be running a race in Atlanta, and they staked out the place to make an arrest. A gate opened as the race was beginning, and he drove on the track to take the green flag. The police vehicles quickly appeared on the track. They chased Flock for a lap or two before he drove through the fence. The police followed him until he ran out of gas. Reminiscing years later, Flock said, "I would have won that race if the cops had stayed out of it."

== Motorsports career results ==
=== NASCAR ===
(key) (Bold – Pole position awarded by qualifying time. Italics – Pole position earned by points standings or practice time. * – Most laps led. ** – All laps led.)

==== Grand National Series ====
NASCAR Grand National Series results
Year	Team	No.	Make	1	2	3	4	5	6	7	8	9	10	11	12	13	14	15	16	17	18	19	20	21	22	23	24	25	26	27	28	29	30	31	32	33	34	35	36	37	38	39	40	41	42	43	44	45	46	47	48	49	50	51	52	53	54	55	56	NGNC	Pts	Ref
1949	Davis Brothers	7	Hudson	**CLT**; 32																																																								3rd	704	
1949	Raymond Parks	14	Ford		DAB; 22																																																							3rd	704	
1949	Frank Christian	7	Olds			**HBO**; 1**	LAN; 2	HAM	MAR; 14	HEI	NWS; 1																																																	3rd	704	
1950	Frank Christian	7	Olds	DAB; 7	CLT; 2	LAN	MAR	CAN	VER	DSP	MCF	CLT	HBO	DSP	HAM	DAR; 27	LAN	NWS; 9	VER	MAR	WIN	HBO																																						20th	314	
1951	Ted Chester	7	Plymouth	DAB	CLT	NMO; 8	GAR	HBO	ASF	NWS	MAR; 10	CAN; 6		CLB; 13	DSP	GAR	GRS	BAI	HEI																																									14th	869	
1951	Ted Chester	7	Lincoln										CLS; 29																																															14th	869	
1951	Ted Chester	7	Olds																	AWS; 10	MCF	ALS	MSF; 20	FMS	MOR	ABS; 1*	DAR; 27	CLB; 4	**CCS**; 18	LAN; 30	CLT; 16	DSP	WIL; 2	HBO	TPN	PGS	MAR	OAK				ATL; 2	GAR	NMO; 20																14th	869	
1951	Ted Chester	77	Hudson																																				NWS; 10	HMS	JSP																			14th	869	
1952	Ted Chester	7	Hudson	PBS	DAB	JSP	NWS	MAR	CLB	ATL	CCS	LAN	DAR	DSP	CAN	HAY	FMS	HBO	CLT	MSF	NIF	OSW	MON	MOR	PPS	MCF	AWS; 1	DAR; 29	CCS	LAN	DSP	WIL	HBO	MAR	NWS	ATL	PBS																							73rd	–	
1954	Ernest Woods	88	Olds	PBS	DAB	JSP	ATL; 31	OSP; 12	OAK	NWS	HBO	CCS	LAN	WIL	MAR	SHA	RSP	CLT	GAR	CLB	LND	HCY	MCF	WGS	PIF	AWS	SFS	GRS	MOR	OAK	CLT	SAN	COR	DAR	CCS	CLT	LAN	MAS	MAR	NWS																				–	–	
1955	Carl Kiekhaefer	308	Chrysler	TCS	PBS	JSP	DAB	OSP	CLB	HBO	NWS	MGY	LAN	CLT	HCY	ASF	TUS	MAR	RCH	NCF	FOR	LIN	MCF	FON	AIR	CLT	PIF	CLB	AWS	MOR	ALS	NYF	SAN	CLT	FOR	MAS	RSP	DAR	MGY	LAN	RSP	GPS	MAS; 5	CLB	MAR	LVP	NWS	HBO												62nd	–	
1956	Mauri Rose	296	Chevy	HCY; 27	CLT	WSS	PBS	ASF	DAB	PBS	WIL																																																	77th	–	
1956	DePaolo Engineering	9	Ford									ATL; 20	NWS	LAN	RCH																																													77th	–	
1956	Mauri Rose	49	Chevy													CLB; 5	CON	GPS	HCY	HBO	MAR	LIN	CLT	POR	EUR	NYF	MER																																	77th	–	
1956	Mauri Rose	4	Chevy																									MAS; 11	CLT	MCF	POR	AWS	RSP	PIF	CSF	CHI	CCF	MGY	OKL	ROA	OBS	SAN	NOR	PIF	MYB	POR	DAR	CSH	CLT	LAN	POR	CLB	HBO	NWP	CLT	CCF	MAR	HCY	WIL	77th	–	

==== Convertible Division ====
NASCAR Convertible Division results
Year	Team	No.	Make	1	2	3	4	5	6	7	8	9	10	11	12	13	14	15	16	17	18	19	20	21	22	23	24	25	26	27	28	29	30	31	32	33	34	35	36	37	38	39	40	41	42	43	44	45	46	47	NCC	Pts	Ref
1956	Hubert Westmoreland	33	Chevy	DAB	CLT	HBO	FAY	PCH	**MGY**; 20	HCY	LCS	GBF	OBS	RSP	LAN	STR	CLB	LKS	TUL	TFT	KSF	MOF	NOR	WIL	CHI	FRS	NYF	TOR	BUF	BEL	LIN	FWS	BGS	CLB	HCY	CLT	FRS	MCF	HEI	RSP	GPS	ATL	MCC	CHI	MAS	CCF	MAR	PIF	AWS	HBO	–	–	
