= Red Byron =

American racing driver (1915–1960)

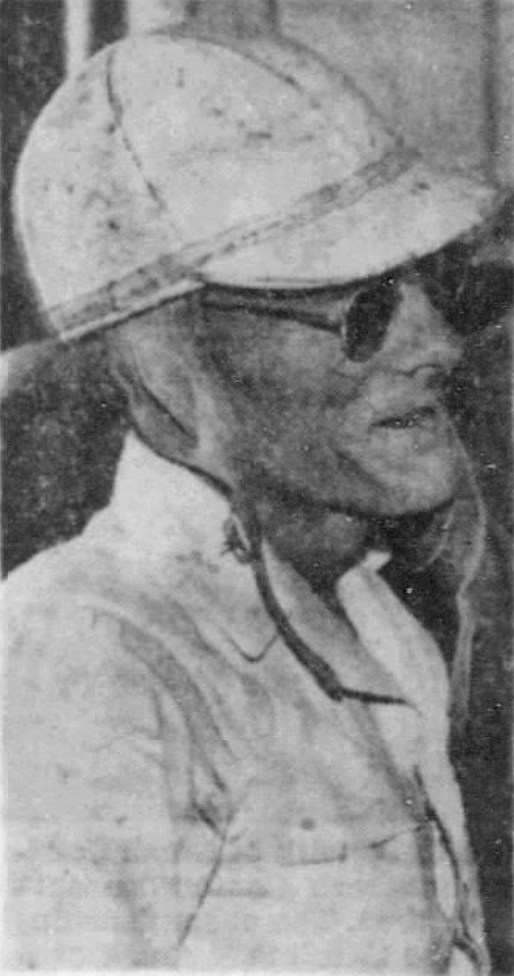
- Byron in 1949
- Born: Robert Nold Byron; March 12, 1915; Plasterco, Virginia, U.S.
- Died: November 11, 1960 (aged 45); Chicago, Illinois, U.S.
- Cause of death: Heart attack
- Achievements: 1949 Strictly Stock Champion (Note: 1949 was the inaugural season of professional stock car racing in NASCAR, which was known as Strictly Stock Division for that year only); 1948 NASCAR Modified Champion (Note: 1948 was the inaugural season of the Modified Division, the oldest division of NASCAR); 1949 Daytona Beach Road Course Winner (Inaugural race); Strictly Stock in wins leader (1949)
- Awards: National Motorsports Hall of Fame (U.S.) (1966); Named one of NASCAR's 50 Greatest Drivers (1998); NASCAR Hall of Fame (2018); Named one of NASCAR's 75 Greatest Drivers (2023)

NASCAR Cup Series career
- 15 races run over 3 years
- Best finish: 1st (1949)
- First race: 1949 Race No. 1 (Charlotte)
- Last race: 1951 Southern 500 (Darlington)
- First win: 1949 (Daytona Beach)
- Last win: 1949 (Martinsville)
Wins	Top tens	Poles
2	9	2
- Statistics up to date as of February 22, 2013.

Robert Nold "Red" Byron (March 12, 1915 – November 11, 1960) was an American stock car racing driver, who was successful in NASCAR competition in the sanctioning body's first years. He was NASCAR's first Modified champion (and its first champion in any division) in 1948 and its first Strictly Stock (predecessor to NASCAR Cup Series) champion in 1949. Along with Bob Flock, he is considered one of the best drivers of the era. He won the first NASCAR race at Daytona Beach and Road Course and won the inaugural NASCAR Strictly Stock driver's championship.

== Background ==
Born in Washington County, Virginia, Byron moved to Colorado at a young age, and then to Anniston, Alabama, which he considered his hometown. Byron began racing in 1932 and was successful in racing at Talladega and Anniston by the start of the 1940s. Byron then made his way to Lakewood Speedway, where he raced any ride he could find. While racing at Lakewood Speedway, he was noticed by Raymond Parks, a former bootlegger and illegal gambling kingpin and current vending machine operator, as well as his mechanic, Red Vogt. Byron would race with Parks at Lakewood Speedway through the spring of 1941.

In the spring of 1941, Byron enlisted in the United States Army Air Corps at an enlistment station in Montgomery, Alabama. Byron was eventually stationed as a flight engineer on B-24 Liberator bombers during World War II, flying in fifty-eight missions while serving engineer duties and tail gunning duties. In 1944, Byron joined his 58th mission after subbing for a fellow serviceman whose wife was going into labor. The mission was targeted for Paramushir, where members of the Imperial Japanese Army and the Imperial Japanese Navy were stationed. The B-24's full assortment of bombs were dropped except for the final one, which was hung on the floor of the aircraft. As the engineer, it was Byron's job to free the hung bomb from the aircraft. After freeing the bomb, Byron was hit by an explosion while he was still near the open doors of the aircraft. It is speculated that the freed bomb exploded while falling out of the aircraft but Byron strongly believed that he had been hit by anti-aircraft fire. The explosion tore Byron's left leg to pieces. A large amount of shrapnel was removed from Byron's leg at a makeshift air base hospital, before being sent to Fitzsimons Army Medical Center where he spent 27 months in rehabilitation.

While in rehabilitation, Byron began sketching devices that would help him return to racing despite the limited movement of his left leg. In 1946, while working on ideas with Vogt, Byron fabricated two stirrup pins on his clutch pedal to help support his left leg. When the stirrup pins were combined with his leg brace, he was able to operate the clutch pedal.

== Racing career ==
Before World War II, Byron raced in the AAA Indy series, mainly in Sprint Cars and Midgets. He achieved his first Stock Car victory in July 1941, while on two-day liberty from training with the USAAF, and with the war intervening, did not return to racing for five years.

Following a lengthy recovery from a leg injury sustained in war, Byron returned to racing in 1945 and with the help of race engineer Red Vogt, was still successful.

Byron won the Hankinson Memorial on February 24, 1946, at Seminole Speedway, beating Roy Hall and Bill France. This was his first win since returning to racing in 1945.

On July 20, 1946, Byron finished second in the inaugural race at Selinsgrove Speedway. The race was part of the AAA Big Car Championship. The race was won by Bill Holland.

NASCAR Modified

1948

In 1948, Byron became a part of the newly-formed NASCAR Modified Series racing with Raymond Parks' team. He won the Rayson Memorial, the first NASCAR sanctioned race. The race took place at the Daytona Beach Road Course, where Byron beat Marshall Teague and Bob Flock. In the second race of the season at Speedway Park, Byron finished third to Fonty Flock and Bob Flock. In the third race of the season, Byron finished second to Fonty Flock at Lakewood Speedway. In the fourth race of the season at Central City Speedway, Byron finished sixth while his championship rival, Fonty Flock, won the race. The fifth race of the season at Hayloft Speedway saw Byron finish outside of the positions that paid points. On April 18, Byron finished second to Fonty Flock at the Greensboro Fairgrounds.

Following a slight drought in winning, Byron would win on April 25 at North Wilkesboro Speedway, beating Fonty Flock and Tim Flock in the sixty lap feature race. Byron would win the next race he started on May 2 at Lakeview Speedway, beating Fonty Flock and Marshall Teague. Byron would win again on May 9 at the Wadesboro Dirt Track, beating Fonty Flock and Roscoe Thompson. At this point in the season, Byron and Fonty Flock had found themselves into a rivalry over the points lead of the series. On May 16, Byron would win at the Atlantic Rural Exposition Fairgrounds, beating Bill Blair and Fonty Flock. Flock wouldn't find himself in a points paying position again until May 30, when he finished second at North Wilkesboro Speedway to Marshall Teague. Byron would pick up the win in the June 5 race at the Greensboro Fairgrounds, passing polesitter Speedy Thompson for first place and beating Tim Flock and Fonty Flock. On July 11, Byron would once again decrease Fonty Flock’s point lead when he won at Charlotte Speedway, passing polesitter Jack Smith for the lead and beating Fonty Flock and Tim Flock. The race, originally scheduled for one hundred laps was shortened to ninety-one laps due to rain.

Byron would race on July 18 at North Wilkesboro Speedway but missed the points due to an issue. Fonty Flock also missed out on points so the race had little impact on the points positions. Curtis Turner would win the race. On July 25, Byron would finish outside of the points yet again at Columbus Speedway after Tragedy had struck. The front-right tire of Byron’s car blew, causing the car to veer off the track and into a group of spectators, injuring sixteen and killing a seven-year-old boy. Shockingly, Byron was not injured in the accident. Later in the race, driver Bill “Slick” Davis was also killed after his car rolled over in a crash.

On August 8, Byron finished third at the Daytona Beach Road Course. Fonty Flock won the race, extending his points lead. On August 15, Byron finished sixth in a two-hundred lap race at Langhorne Speedway. Fonty Flock did not finish in the points which helped Byron shorten his lead in the points championship. On September 5, Byron finished third at Columbus Speedway after the race was halted due to rain. Fonty Flock did not finish ahead of Byron which shortened his points lead even more. On September 12, Byron would finish third twice at Charlotte Speedway during a double header while Fonty Flock and Tim Flock would be involved in a bad four car pile up. Due to the pile up, the second race was shortened from forty laps to twenty-four laps. These results shortened Fonty Flock's points lead even further. Unfortunately for Byron, Fonty Flock would win three in a row through the month of September between a double header sweep at Occoneechee Speedway and a win at Lakeview Speedway, extending the points lead once again.

On October 3, during a double header at Central City Speedway, Byron would finish third at in race one, ahead of Fonty Flock, shrinking the points deficit. In race two of the double header, Byron fought his way from tenth to first to win the race, giving him the series points lead. On October 10, Byron would finish a close second to Fonty Flock at the Greensboro Fairgrounds. On October 16, Byron would once again finish a close second to Fonty Flock at the Greensboro Fairgrounds. On October 17, a day after finishing second to Flock at Greensboro, Byron would win at North Wilkesboro Speedway in a one hundred lap feature race. On October 24, Byron would win another one hundred lap feature race at Charlotte Speedway, with Fonty Flock coming in second. Fonty Fock would win the next race on October 31 at the Forsyth County Fairgrounds, with Byron coming in second after racing close with Flock for most of the race. The season final was held on November 14 at Columbus Raceway. The race saw Byron win with Fonty Flock coming in second. With the season final finished, Byron was officially crowned the 1948 NASCAR Modified Champion. Byron accumulated 11 wins and 25 top fives during the season.

1949

In 1949, Byron ran a more limited schedule in the NASCAR Modified Division, starting 11 races. The first modified race that Byron participated in during the 1949 season was on January 23, where Byron would bring his car home in fifth place at Broward Speedway. Despite its large schedule, Byron would not start another modified race sanctioned by NASCAR until April 3, where he would take the win over Curtis Turner and Bill Blair at Charlotte Speedway in a forty lap feature race. Following his win at Charlotte, Byron would enter the April 10 race at the Greensboro Fairgrounds. Byron would finish second to Curtis Tuner. The next race that Byron entered was the April 17 race at Lakeview Speedway, where he would finish fourth. Byron's next start would come on May 8 at Lakewood Speedway, where he would finish third, behind Olin Allen and Jack Smith. on May 15, Byron would head back to Charlotte Speedway and win his second consecutive modified race at the track. On May 22, Byron would head to North Wilkesboro Speedway, where he would finish second to Tim Flock.

Byron would make his way to Lakeview Speedway on May 29, where he would finish second to Tim Flock again. Flock would then have two third-place results on June 26 during a double header at Harris Speedway, finishing behind Curtis Turner and Jack Smith in race one. In race two, Byron finished behind Tim Flock and Fonty Flock. Byron would move to focusing on the NASCAR Strictly Stock series full time, not making another start in the Modified Division. Byron would finish every race and end the season with eleven starts, two wins, ten top-fives, and eleven top-tens. He would end the season seventh in points despite starting less than a quarter of the seasons races.

1950

In 1950, Byron started two races in the Modified Division, both coming in March. On March 5, Byron won a one hundred lap race at Charlotte Speedway, beating Al Keller and Tommy Coates. In Byron's second and final race of the year on March 19, Byron finished second to Tim Flock in a fifty lap feature at Occoneechee Speedway.

NASCAR Strictly Stock/Grand National

1949

In 1949, Byron began racing in NASCAR's newly formed Strictly Stock series, which became the Grand National series, Winston Cup, and the modern-day NASCAR Cup Series. With Parks in tow, Byron was equally successful in the inaugural eight-race season. In race one on June 19 at Charlotte Speedway, Byron would finish 3rd behind Jim Roper and career rival Fonty Flock. In race two at the Daytona Beach Road Course, Byron would win the race after Gober Sosebee, who led 34 of the 40 scheduled laps, had an issue with seven to go. Byron would lead the final six laps in route to victory. On August 7, during the third race of the season at Occoneechee Speedway, Byron finished twenty-second after being involved in a five-car pileup on the thirty-ninth lap. Byron entered the fourth race of the season on September 11 at Langhorne Speedway, qualifying on the pole for the race. After battling with Curtis Turner and Bob Flock for two hundred laps, Byron finished the race in the third position.

Byron did not compete in the fifth race of the year on September 18 at Hamburg Speedway, as most regulars did not compete due to the event being competed so far north. Byron would compete in the September 25 race at Martinsville Speedway, winning the race and leading an impressive ninety seven laps. The victory at Martinsville all but wrapped up the championship for Byron, leading him to sit out of race seven at Heidelberg Raceway on October 2. The eighth and final race of the season was the Wilkes 200, taking place on October 16. Byron finished sixteenth and was crowned Strictly Stock Champion at the conclusion of the race by a margin of 117.5 points over Lee Petty. Byron finished the season with two wins, four top fives, and four top tens. Byron, as with his previous year in a modified, ended the year as the series' first champion.

1950

Due to declining health relating to his leg injury, Byron started racing less and less. Byron raced just four of the nineteen races of the 1950 NASCAR Grand National season. On February 5, Byron finished second in the first race of the season at the Daytona Beach Road Course after battling with winner Harold Kite for most of the race. In race two on April 2 at Charlotte Speedway, Byron finished fourth after leading forty two laps. Byron did not return to the series again until race thirteen, where he finished third in the 1950 Southern 500. The last race that Byron ran in the season was the 1950 Wilkes 200, where he would finish nineteenth with a spindle issue. This was the first season that Byron had gone winless in NASCAR sanctioned competition. Byron would finish the season with zero wins, three top fives, and three top tens.

1951

In 1951, Byron ran just five of the forty one races included in the NASCAR Grand National schedule. The first race that Byron ran was the season opener at the Daytona Beach Road Course on February 11. Byron would finish eleventh after not leading any laps. Byron would then go on to race in the tenth race of the season on June 10 at Columbus Speedway where he would finish sixth. Byron would then race the eleventh race on June 16 at Columbia Speedway, where he would finish thirtieth. His thirtieth-place finish was the worst finish of his NASCAR Grand National career. Byron wouldn't race again until the twentieth race of the season, The Motor City 250, on August 12 at the Michigan State Fairgrounds. Byron would finish the race in fourth, nine laps down. The last race of the season that Byron entered was the Southern 500 at Darlington Raceway. This start would be the last of his career. Byron would finish the race in the twenty fifth position following in accident. Byron would round out the year with zero wins, one top fives, and two top tens.

Byron raced sparingly after his two championships. He owned a sports car racing team for much of the 1950s.

== Life after driving ==
Declining health forced Byron to hang up his goggles in 1951, but he remained active in racing. He worked with Briggs Cunningham, who was trying to develop an American sports car that could win Grand Prix races, then become manager of a Corvette team with the same goal. Neither project succeeded, but Byron enjoyed sports cars.

On January 19, 2018, Byron was inducted into the NASCAR Hall of Fame's Class of 2018.

== Death ==
Byron died of a heart attack in a Chicago hotel room on November 11, 1960, at the age of 45, he was in Chicago to talk with Anheuser-Busch executives about starting a sports car team. At the time of his death, Byron was managing the Scarab SCCA team which was owned by Augi Pabst and Harry Heuer. Byron was set to fly to Daytona Beach the next day to be with the team for the championship race that weekend at Daytona International Speedway. The race was set to be the team's last race before disbanding.

== Motorsports career results ==
=== NASCAR ===
(key) (Bold – Pole position awarded by qualifying time. Italics – Pole position earned by points standings or practice time. * – Most laps led.)

==== Grand National Series ====
NASCAR Grand National Series results
Year	Team	No.	Make	1	2	3	4	5	6	7	8	9	10	11	12	13	14	15	16	17	18	19	20	21	22	23	24	25	26	27	28	29	30	31	32	33	34	35	36	37	38	39	40	41	NGNC	Pts
1949	Raymond Parks	22	Olds	CLT; 3	DAB; 1	HBO; 22	**LAN**; 3	HAM	MAR; 1	HEI	NWS; 16																																		1st	842.5
1950	Raymond Parks	22	Olds	DAB; 2	**CLT**; 4	LAN	MAR	CAN	VER	DSP	MCF	CLT	HBO	DSP	HAM																														NA	0
1950	Raymond Parks	22	Cadillac													DAR; 3	LAN	NWS; 19	VER	MAR	WIN	HBO																							NA	0
1951	Wally Marks	1	Olds	DAB; 11	CLT	NMO	GAR	HBO	ASF	NWS	MAR	CAN																																	NA	0
1951	B.J. Dantone	22	Ford										CLS; 6																																NA	0
1951	B.J. Dantone	83	Ford											CLB; 30	DSP	GAR	GRS	BAI	HEI	AWS	MCF	ALS	MSF; 4	FMS	MOR	ABS	DAR; 25	CLB	CCS	LAN	CLT	DSP	WIL	HBO	TPN	PGS	MAR	OAK	NWS	HMS	JSP	ATL	GAR	NMO	NA	0

== Awards ==
Byron was inducted into the National Motorsports Hall of Fame in 1966.

In 1998, as part of NASCAR's 50th Anniversary celebration, he was selected as one of NASCAR's 50 Greatest Drivers.

Byron was inducted into the International Motorsports Hall of Fame in 2008

Byron was inducted into the NASCAR Hall of Fame on January 19, 2018. His induction was accepted by Winston Kelley, the executive director for the NASCAR Hall of Fame.

Byron was inducted into the Motorsports Hall of Fame of America on March 17, 2020.

In 2023, as part of NASCAR's 75th Anniversary celebration, he was included as one of NASCAR's 75 Greatest Drivers. Byron was automatically included because he was part of the original 50 Greatest Drivers.

Sporting positions
Preceded by Fonty Flock (NCSCC)	NASCAR Modified Division Champion; 1948	Succeeded by Fonty Flock
Preceded by Inaugural	NASCAR Strictly Stock Series Champion; 1949	Succeeded by Bill Rexford
