= 1949 NASCAR Strictly Stock Series =

American motorsport season

1949 NASCAR Strictly Stock

Seasons
- ← None 1950 →

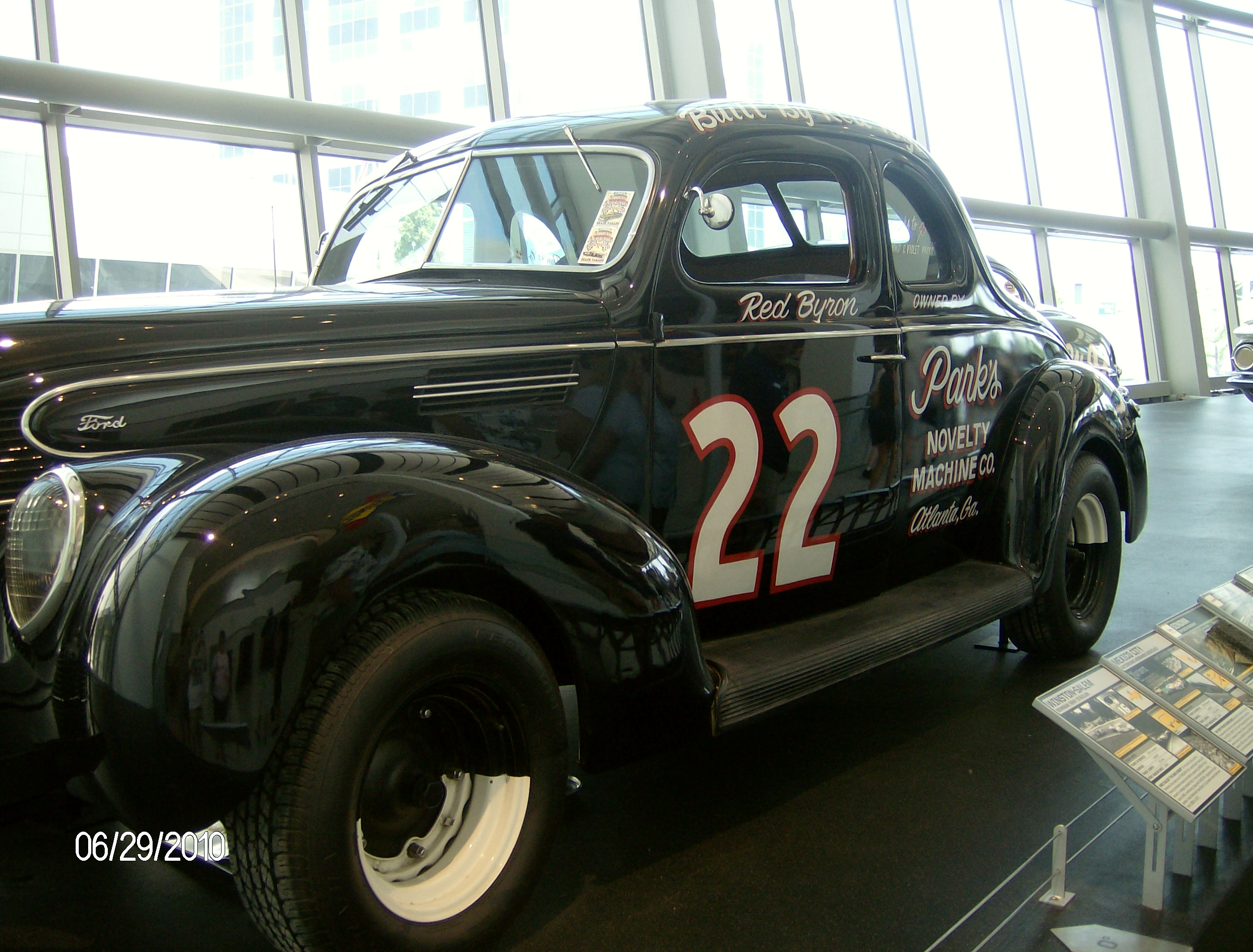
Red Byron's car, the inaugural NASCAR Cup Series champion.

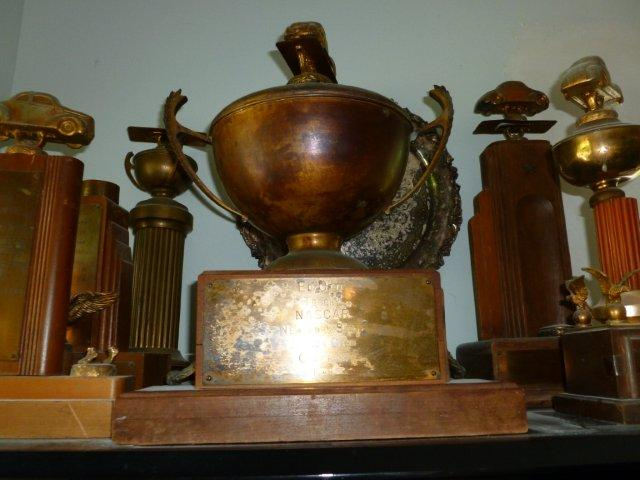
Trophies from the inaugural season

The 1949 NASCAR Strictly Stock season was the inaugural season of professional stock car racing in the United States. Beginning at Charlotte Speedway on June 19, 1949, the season included eight races and two exhibition races. The season concluded with the Wilkes 200 at North Wilkesboro Speedway on October 16. Raymond Parks won the Owners' Championship, while Red Byron won the Drivers' Championship with a 16th-place finish at the final race of the season.

== Teams and drivers ==
Make	Team	No.	Driver	Crew Chief	Rounds
Buick	Gilmer Goode	38	Lee Petty		1
Ford	Raymond Parks	14	Bob Flock		1
Oldsmobile	Buddy Elliott	90	Tim Flock		5
Oldsmobile	Frank Christian	7	Bob Flock		4
Oldsmobile	Leon Chester	50	Gober Sosebee		3
Oldsmobile	Raymond Parks	22	Red Byron		6
Plymouth	Petty Enterprises	42	Lee Petty		5

== Season recap ==
No.	Date	Race	Circuit	Pole position	Most laps led	Winning driver	Manufacturer
1	June 19	1949–01	Charlotte Speedway	Bob Flock	Bill Blair	Jim Roper (Note: Jim Roper initially finished second behind Glenn Dunaway, but NASCAR later disqualified Dunaway for failing post-race inspection.)	Lincoln
2	July 10	1949–02	Daytona Beach Road Course	Gober Sosebee	Gober Sosebee	Red Byron	Oldsmobile
3	August 7	1949–03	Occoneechee Speedway	Bob Flock	Bob Flock	Bob Flock	Oldsmobile
4	September 11	1949–04	Langhorne Speedway	Red Byron	Gober Sosebee	Curtis Turner	Oldsmobile
5	September 18	1949–05	Hamburg Speedway	Glenn Dunaway	Glenn Dunaway	Jack White	Lincoln
6	September 25	1949–06	Martinsville Speedway	Curtis Turner	Red Byron	Red Byron	Oldsmobile
7	October 2	1949–07	Heidelberg Raceway	Al Bonnell	Lee Petty	Lee Petty	Plymouth
8	October 16	Wilkes 200	North Wilkesboro Speedway	Kenneth Wagner	Bill Blair	Bob Flock	Oldsmobile

== Race summaries ==
=== 1949–01 ===
The very first NASCAR Strictly Stock race was held June 19 at Charlotte Speedway, a 3/4 mile dirt track in Charlotte, North Carolina owned by Carl C. Allison on Little Rock Rd. Bob Flock won the pole. Glenn Dunaway was declared the original winner, although a post-race inspection revealed that his car was fitted with illegal springs, causing NASCAR to disqualify him.

Top Ten Results

1. 34 - Jim Roper
2. 47 - Fonty Flock
3. 22 - Red Byron
4. 2 - Sam Rice
5. 90 - Tim Flock
6. 37 - Archie Smith
7. 31 - Sterling Long
8. 28 - Slick Smith
9. 41 - Curtis Turner
10. 36 - Jimmy Thompson

=== 1949–02 ===
The second race of the Strictly Stock season was held July 10 at the Daytona Beach Road Course. Gober Sosebee won the pole. Sosebee led the first 34 laps and was passed by Red Byron after he got sideways in the north turn with six laps remaining. Byron won the 166-mile NASCAR Strictly Stock race on the sands of the 4.15-mile Daytona Beach and Road Course. There were 21 of the 28 starters running at the finish. Byron won the caution free race with an average speed of 80.883 mph and won with a gap of 1:51 over second-place finisher Tim Flock.

Three female drivers, Sara Christian, Louise Smith, and Ethel Mobley, started the race. Mobley was the highest finishers of the female drivers, finishing in 11th place with her Cadillac. Christian in her Ford finished 18th, while Smith finished 20th after flipping her car early in the race. Pre-race favorites Curtis Turner, Bob Flock and Glenn Dunaway all failed to make it to the finish.

This race took two hours, three minutes and 15 seconds to complete 40 laps. The lead was swapped twice by Sosebee and Byron. Dunaway finished last in this race, which, along with his disqualification at Charlotte, means that Dunaway finished last in the first two races in the season.

Top Ten Results

1. 22 - Red Byron
2. 90 - Tim Flock
3. 5 - Frank Mundy
4. 7 - Joe Littlejohn
5. 44 - Bill Blair
6. 37 - Frank Christian
7. 16 - Bill Snowden
8. 50 - Gober Sosebee
9. 36 - Jimmy Thompson
10. 15 - Jack Etheridge

=== 1949–03 ===
The third race of the Strictly Stock season was held August 7 at Occoneechee Speedway. Bob Flock scored his first win of the season in the 200-mile Strictly Stock race at Hillsboro's Occoneechee Speedway, giving Oldsmobile its second straight victory. Flock won the race with a gap of 42 seconds from runner-up Gober Sosebee to collect the $2,000.00 first prize. Third place went to Glenn Dunnaway, Fonty Flock took fourth, and Bill Snowden fifth.

Tim Flock was pressuring brother Bob in the late stages, but a broken right-front spindle sent his Oldsmobile to the sidelines with ten laps to go. The younger Flock got credit for seventh in the final rundown. The race was marred by a five-car crash triggered by Sara Christian. Christian spun her Ford after losing the right front wheel in the 38th lap and as she tried to steer her car toward the pit area on the next lap, Felix Wilkes' Lincoln collided with her. Red Byron, the point leader in the Strictly Stock series, collided with Wilkes's car as he exited turn four. Bob Smith's Olds also crashed in a solo crash. There were no drivers injured in the crash. A crowd of 18,000 watched as Flock averaged 76.8 mph on the low-banked, one-mile dirt oval.

Top Ten Results

1. 7 - Bob Flock
2. 50 - Gober Sosebee
3. 55 - Glenn Dunaway
4. 47 - Fonty Flock
5. 3 - Bill Snowden
6. 44 - Bill Blair
7. 90 - Tim Flock
8. 19 - Otis Martin
9. 42 - Lee Petty
10. 28 - Buddy Helms

=== 1949–04 ===
The fourth race of the Strictly Stock season was held September 11 at Langhorne Speedway. Red Byron won the pole. Curtis Turner, the "Blond Blizzard" out of Roanoke, Virginia, out dueled Bob Flock and came home first in the celebrated 200-mile Strictly Stock race at the famed circular Langhorne Speedway before 20,000 spectators. Sara Christian, leading female driver out of Atlanta, finished sixth in a sterling performance. Her effort in the grueling 200-lapper prompted race officials to escort her to victory lane to join winner Turner in the ceremonies. Turner drove his Oldsmobile into the lead in the 141st lap when Bob Flock went to the pits for a tire change. Turner led the rest of the way to pocket the $2,250.00 first prize. Flock scampered out of the pits and finished second, 20 seconds behind the winner. Third place went to point leader Red Byron as Oldsmobiles finished 1–2–3. Frank Mundy and Bill Blair rounded out the top five, both driving Cadillacs. Forty-five new Strictly Stock automobiles went to the starting post, the most cars to start a race in the 1949 season. Turner averaged 69.403 mph. Byron and Sosebee earned the front row starting positions in qualifying. Fonty Flock, however, registered the fastest time in "Speed Trials" with an 80.140 fast lap. Fonty challenged Byron and Sosebee at the start, but the engine in his Buick blew after three laps. Sosebee struggled with tire problems and wound up 19th. Len Brown drove a 1947 Ford Convertible in the 200-mile championship chase—the first person to drive an open-top vehicle on the premier NASCAR Stock car tour. Brown managed to come home 28th—earning $25.00 for his day of work. Accidents took out Pepper Cunningham, Walter Minx and Chick DiNatale. Tim Flock was a contender for victory until sidelined by a lost wheel.

Top Ten Results

1. 41 - Curtis Turner
2. 7 - Bob Flock
3. 22 - Red Byron
4. 44 - Frank Mundy
5. 46 - Bill Blair
6. 71 - Sara Christian
7. 42 - Lee Petty
8. 89 - Al Keller
9. 6 - Al Bonnell
10. 52 - Lou Volk

=== 1949–05 ===
The fifth race of the Strictly Stock season was held September 18 at Hamburg Speedway. Young Jack White drove a Lincoln to victory in the 100-mile Strictly Stock race at Hamburg Speedway in an event dominated by Northern drivers. White sailed into the lead when erstwhile leader Glenn Dunaway lost a wheel on his Olds, forcing him out of the race in the 134th lap. With Dunaway out of the way, White was able to hold off Ray Erickson to take the $1,500.00 top prize. Billy Rafter wound up third, Mike Eagen was fourth and Bill Rexford took fifth. Dunaway, disqualified from victory in the season opener at Charlotte in June, appeared to be headed for an easy win until his misfortune. His 134 laps completed gave him ninth in the final rundown in the field of sixteen cars. A sell-out crowd of 11,733 jammed the wooden grandstands to watch the fifth event of the year in NASCAR's new Strictly Stock division.

Top Ten Results

1. 25 - Jack White
2. 5 - Ray Erickson
3. ?? - Billy Rafter
4. ?? - Mike Eagen
5. 59 - Bill Rexford
6. ?? - Frankie Schneider
7. 43 - Jack Russell
8. ?? - Charles Muscatel
9. 55 - Glenn Dunaway
10. ?? - Ellis Pearce

=== 1949–06 ===
The sixth race of the Strictly Stock season was held September 25 at Martinsville Speedway. Curtis Turner won the pole. Red Byron all but wrapped up the 1949 Strictly Stock championship with an overwhelming triumph in the 100-miler at Martinsville Speedway. The 33-year-old veteran out of Atlanta, drove his Oldsmobile into the lead on lap 104 and led the rest of the way. Finishing second, three laps behind Byron, was Lee Petty's Plymouth. Ray Erickson finished third, Clyde Minter fourth, and Bill Blair fifth. Pole sitter Curtis Turner led the opening 18 laps, but gave way to the hard-charging Fonty Flock, who started fourth. Flock was pacing the field when his Buick lost a right front wheel and crashed into Slick Smith's Hudson. Byron took the lead when Flock departed and was never seriously challenged the rest of the way. Turner faded after leading early and wound up ninth, 29 laps off the pace.

This race has consistently remained on the NASCAR championship calendar, although in 1956 it was changed from 200 to 400 laps after the track was paved and lengthened to 500 laps in 1957. It was known as the Old Dominion 500 until 1982 and has since undergone numerous name changes. The race is now called the Xfinity 500.

Top Ten Results

1. 22 - Red Byron
2. 42 - Lee Petty
3. 5 - Ray Erickson
4. 19 - Clyde Minter
5. 2 - Bill Blair
6. 16 - Bill Snowden
7. 55 - Glenn Dunaway
8. 3 - Al Wagoner
9. 41 - Curtis Turner
10. 36 - Archie Smith

=== 1949–07 ===
The seventh race of the Strictly Stock season was held October 2 at Heidelberg Raceway, near Pittsburgh, PA. In the first Strictly Stock event in Charlotte in June, Lee Petty entered a bulky Buick Roadmaster. The enormous automobile was fast on the straights, but it wobbled like a tank through the turns. Just past the halfway point, Petty rolled the Buick a number of times. After dismounting the mangled mass of metal, the North Carolina speedster vowed never to drive a heavy vehicle in competition again. In the 100-mile event at Heidelberg Speedway, Petty driving his number 42 lightweight Plymouth, was five full laps ahead of his nearest competitor. "We figured the lighter car would get through the turns better," said Petty. "It would also be easier on the suspension parts. We knew we could win one with the Plymouth." The big triumph at Heidelberg was the largest winning margin of any NASCAR Strictly Stock race in 1949. Dick Linder's Kaiser finished second, but was in no position to challenge the fleet Petty. Bill Rexford finished third, Sam Rice's Chevrolet was fourth with relief driver Glenn Dunanway at the helm.

Despite finishing 10 laps down from Petty, Sara Christian managed to finish the race in fifth place, the first time a female driver has cracked the top five in a premier NASCAR event and still to this day remains as the highest ever finish recorded by a female driver in the NASCAR Cup Series. Al Bonnell, a driver of open wheel fame, qualified for the pole with a speed of 61.475 mph. However, Bonnell's Olds was the first car out of the race, and was placed at the end of the 23 car field in the final rundown. Bonnell then relieved Don Rogalla and carried his Ford to 10th and the finish. Petty averaged 57.458 mph.

Top Ten Results

1. 42 - Lee Petty
2. 8 - Dick Linder
3. 4 - Bill Rexford
4. 2 - Sam Rice
5. 1 - Sara Christian
6. 21 - Lloyd Moore
7. 18 - John Wright
8. 43 - Jack Russell
9. 23 - Skip Lewis
10. 20 - Don Rogala

=== Wilkes 200 ===
The Wilkes 200, the eighth and final race of the Strictly Stock season, was held October 16 at North Wilkesboro Speedway. Kenneth Wagner won the pole. Bob Flock took the lead in the closing stages when mechanical problems kayoed Bill Blair and edged Lee Petty to win the season finale at North Wilkesboro Speedway. It was the eighth and final point race of the year, although two additional non-point events were staged by Sam Nunis at Atlanta's Lakewood Speedway. Red Byron, finishing 16th, was crowned Strictly Stock champion in 1949 by a margin of 117.5 points over Petty. Blair, wheeling Sam Rice's Cadallic, started second on the grid and jumped out to lead at the drop of the green flag. The diminutive High Point, NC star led the first 180 laps, but a souring engine robbed him once again of certain victory. Flock's Oldsmobile nipped Petty's Plymouth by a mere 100 yards in the finish. Fonty Flock, Clyde Minter and Herb Thomas rounded out the top five.

Top Ten Results

1. 7 - Bob Flock
2. 42 - Lee Petty
3. 47 - Fonty Flock
4. 19 - Clyde Minter
5. 92 - Herb Thomas
6. 14 - Roy Hall
7. 5 - Ray Erickson
8. 9 - Raymond Lewis
9. 41 - Curtis Turner
10. 44 - Bill Blair

== Final points standings ==
(key) Bold - Pole position awarded by time. Italics - Pole position set by owner's points standings. * – Most laps led.

Pos.	Driver	Races								Points
Pos.	Driver	CLT	DAB	OCC	LAN	HAM	MAR	HEI	NWS	Points
1	Red Byron	3	1	22	**3**		1*		16	842.5
2	Lee Petty	17		9	7		2	1*	2	725
3	Bob Flock	**32**	22	**1***	2		14		1	704
4	Bill Blair	12*	5	6	5		5		10*	567.5
5	Fonty Flock	2	19	4	45		12		3	554.5
6	Curtis Turner	9	25	20	1*		**9**		9	430
7	Ray Erickson					2	3	15	7	422
8	Tim Flock	5	2	7	31				19	421
9	Glenn Dunnaway	33	28	3		**9***	7	18		384
10	Frank Mundy	30	3		4				22	370
11	Bill Snowden	22	7	5			6			315
12	Bill Rexford				14	5		3		286
13	Sara Christian	14	18	23	6			5	12	282
14	Clyde Minter						4		4	280
15	Gober Sosebee		**8***	2	19					265
16	Jim Roper	1		15						253
17	Sam Rice	4						4		231
18	Jack White					1				200
19	Dick Linder				26			2	20	180.5
20	Billy Rafter					3				160
21	Archie Smith	6					10			145
22	Jack Russell				42	7		8		140
23	Mike Eagan					4				140
24	Joe Littlejohn		4							140
25	Herb Thomas	29	12	26					5	132
26	Sterling Long	7		28						100
27	Frank Christian		6							100
28	Roy Hall								6	100
29	Lloyd Moore							6		100
30	Frankie Schneider					6				100
31	Slick Smith	8	13				13		13	99
32	Al Keller				8					90
33	Al Bonnell				9			**23**		80
34	John Wright							7		80
35	Otis Martin	20		8			15		21	69.5
36	Jimmy Thompson	10	9							65
37	Raymond Lewis								8	60
38	Charles Muscatell					8				60
39	Al Wagoner						8			60
40	Skip Lewis							9		40
41	Lou Volk				10					30
42	Buddy Helms			10						27.5
43	Bob Apperson			13					11	25
44	Ted Chamberlain					11		13		24
45	Bill Bennett				11					24
46	Buck Baker	11	23							20
47	Jack Etheridge		10							20
48	Ellis Pearce					10				20
49	Bobby Greene			11					17	19.5
50	Kenneth Wagner						11	16	**15**	19
51	Budd Olsen				12					18
52	Ethel Mobley		11		44					16
53	Clarence Burris							11		16
54	J. D. Edwards			12						13.5
55	Dick Zimmerman				13					12
56	Sam Rider					12				12
57	Joe Merola							12		12
58	Jack Smith	13								12
59	Frank Matthews					13				8
60	Erwin Blatt				15					4
61	Frank Smith	21		14						4
62	Marshall Teague		14							4
63	Louise Smith		20	27	16					4
64	Bob Cameron					14				4
65	Nick Garin							14		4
66	H. F. Stikeleather								14	4
67	John Barker	15								4
68	Don Cecchini				17					3.5
69	Lee Schmidt				18					3
70	Bob Appleton					15				3
71	Chuck Mahoney					16				2.5
72	Billy Carden		15							2
73	Ken Marriott				20					2
74	Ed Tyson				21					1.5
75	Bill Greever								18	1
76	Ken Schroeder				22					1
77	Tommy Coates				23					0.5
	Don Rogala							10		0
	Jimmie Lewallen	16		25	30					0
	Howard Elder		16							0
	Bill Harrison			16						0
	B. E. Renfro	24		17						0
	Jack O'Brien				38			17		0
	Woodie Wilson		17							0
	Skimp Hersey	18								0
	Garland Smith			18						0
	Jim Carrusso			19				20		0
	Bob Smith	19		21						0
	Curt Foss							19		0
	Buckshot Morris		21		35					0
	Ralph Zrimsek							21		0
	John Riggi							22		0
	Jim Paschal	23								0
	Felix Wilkes	27		24	41					0
	Sam Marshall		24							0
	Wally Campbell				24					0
	Fred Johnson	25	26							0
	Harvey Hillgas				25					0
	George Mantooth	26								0
	Benny Georgeson		27							0
	Ben Cannizzaro				27					0
	Pee Wee Martin	28								0
	Len Brown				28					0
	Pat Kirkwood				29					0
	Clarence Benton	31								0
	Jim Rathmann				32					0
	Pepper Cunningham				33					0
	John Belgard				34					0
	Johnny Rogers				36					0
	Chick DiNatale				37					0
	Tony Genove				39					0
	Jim Delaney				40					0
	Walter Minx				43					0
Pos.	Driver	Races								Points
Pos.	Driver	CLT	DAB	OCC	LAN	HAM	MAR	HEI	NWS	Points
