= Walter Minx =

Walter Paul Minx (February 7, 1917 – June 30, 2009) was a young German immigrant who, in 1940, conspired with his brother Kurt, to extort $100,000 from a Sears Co. executive by threatening to blow up a Sears store in Milwaukee, Wisconsin. Minx planned to abscond with the money in a home-built submarine but quick police work eventually led to his arrest and imprisonment.

== Initial plan ==
Minx's family emigrated from Germany to Milwaukee in 1925. He was nicknamed "Der Macher" (The Doer) because of his ability to build almost anything. In his early twenties, Walter opened an ornamental ironworks shop and the business was soon thriving. But despite the amount of work coming in, Walter was in serious debt. He'd borrowed money from relatives and was uncertain of his ability to pay it back. "I was petrified," he would later tell a reporter, "I was terrified." So he decided on a quick money-making scheme: he would extort money from a rich man using a bomb threat.

Minx first set about building a bomb using a one-inch metal pipe, gunpowder collected from 35 12-gauge shotgun shells, a wind-up clock, and a spring mechanism. Minx related that "It took a long time to get the trigger just right." But he had an even more ambitious project going on the side: a one-man submarine.

Minx needed a foolproof method of retrieving the extortion money without getting caught and a submarine, with its ability to submerge and creep away undetected from a watery drop-off point, seemed ideal. One newspaper account said he got the notion from reading a story in a detective magazine but Minx later claimed it was entirely his own idea. Using sheet metal, tin cans, and plumbing fixtures, he set about constructing his sub.

The first prototype proved inadequate to the task and was later found by the police, resting in a patch of weeds behind his parents’ home at 3725-A N. Holton St. Minx began work on a second model.

The resulting craft was seven feet long, powered by automobile batteries connected to a small electric starter motor. It weighed about 400lbs. Moveable fins on the exterior hull enabled the sub to dive while two-gallon tin cans inside could be filled with lake water using a valve made from a kitchen sink faucet. The cans acted as ballast tanks and helped maintain neutral buoyancy once the vessel dipped below the waves. A small pressurized oxygen tank allowed the sub to stay submerged for up to 48 hours. The sub's operator navigated via a conning tower featuring clear celluloid windows on three sides. Hand-operated levers were used to raise and lower the diving fins and steer the rudder while a radiator petcock could be opened to regulate interior air pressure when necessary. The sub's entry hatch could be bolted closed and opened from the inside.

Once completed, Minx and his brother Kurt then tested the sub several times in the shallow waters of Whitefish Bay. It seemed to work satisfactorily.

The man targeted for the extortion plot was Rowland H. Davie whose picture Minx had once seen in a newspaper. Davie managed the Sears stores in Milwaukee and Minx figured that "...a fellow like that would get a big salary." Minx's plan was for Davie to hire a small plane from Curtis Wright Airport (now known as Lawrence J. Timmerman Airport) at 7:30 pm on July 26, fly in a designated straight line and drop a money bundle containing $100,000 over Lake Michigan upon sighting two blinking lights (coming from Minx's sub). The plane was to continue flying another 50 miles before turning back, giving Minx time to maneuver his submarine over to the bundle and retrieve the money. He would then submerge for several hours before deliberately scuttling the craft off McKinley Beach and swimming to shore where his car was parked nearby.

== Change in course ==
Minx wrote out a crudely printed note informing Davie that a small bomb would be detonated at a local Sears store and a larger one would follow if Davie didn't deliver the $100,000 as directed. On July 23, 1940, Minx placed the note on the porch of Davie's house. Unbeknownst to Minx, however, Davie no longer lived there. It was now occupied by Circuit Judge William Shaughnessy who promptly contacted the police. The following day, Minx planted a small bomb in a storeroom at the Sears store on North Ave, timing it to go off when few people would be inside. At 6:18 pm the bomb exploded, holing a plywood partition and damaging a few lawnmowers.

But the plot was developing a few kinks. Walter and Kurt were having trouble with the sub. In the calm shallows of Whitefish Bay, it had performed flawlessly. But when they tried taking it out into deeper waters they couldn't fully submerge the vessel because the waves were too rough. Walter decided an alternate drop-off scheme was needed so he spent several days devising a new arrangement to be executed via motorcycle. He also drafted new letters delivered to Davie explaining the change in plans.

In the meantime, police were able to determine that metal fragments from the Sears store bomb blast were of a type used in ornamental ironwork. A Sears store employee then remembered that some cashier's cages had been built by one Walter Minx. The police paid a visit to Walter's shop and found scrap metal matching the bomb fragments. Arrested at his home, Minx immediately confessed to the extortion plot. But despite his insistence that his brother Kurt had backed out of the scheme earlier on, he too was arrested and tried. Both men were convicted and sentenced to prison. A request for pardon was turned down by then-Governor Julius Heil.

== Aftermath ==
Minx was released from prison in 1946. He moved from Milwaukee to Saukville, Wisconsin, married, opened a hardware store (Minx Hardware), and later became a master plumber. He also obtained a pilot's license and built a 36-foot cabin cruiser in his backyard. Yet he was never quite able to shake his past notoriety. Late in his life, he told a reporter, "I am bitter for 50 years. I paid my debt to society. I was guilty, there was no question about it. But there shouldn't even have been a trial. I confessed. All my work is for naught. I'm still an ex-con. It still brings emotion." In 1949, Minx attempted a venture into the NASCAR Strictly Stock Series (now the NASCAR Cup Series), making his first and only career start at Langhorne Speedway, where he would finish 43rd after being involved in an accident on lap 25. In 1983 Minx and his wife Eleanor moved to Port Charlotte, Florida. He died at Winkler Court, Fort Myers, Florida on June 30, 2009. He was 92 years old.

== Motorsports career results ==
=== NASCAR ===
(key) (Bold – Pole position awarded by qualifying time. Italics – Pole position earned by points standings or practice time. * – Most laps led. ** – All laps led.)

==== NASCAR Strictly Stock Series ====
NASCAR Strictly Stock Series results
Year	Team	No.	Make	1	2	3	4	5	6	7	8	NSSC	Pts	Ref
1949	Walter Minx	49	Buick	CLT	DAB	HBO	LAN; 43	HAM	MAR	HEI	NWS	109th	0	
