= Ethel Mobley =

American racing driver (1914–1984)

- Born: Ethel Ann Flock; March 8, 1914; Fort Payne, Alabama, U.S.
- Died: June 26, 1984 (aged 70)

NASCAR Cup Series career
- 2 races run over 1 year
- Best finish: 52nd (1949)
- First race: 1949 NASCAR's second race (Daytona Beach)
- Last race: 1949 (Langhorne)
Wins	Top tens	Poles
0	0	0
- Statistics up to date as of March 8, 2016.

Ethel Ann Mobley (née Flock; March 8, 1914 – June 26, 1984) of Fort Payne, Alabama was tied for the second female to drive in NASCAR history. Her brother Tim Flock said she was named after the gasoline her father used in his car.

== "Flying Flocks" ==
Part of the racing Flock family, three of her brothers are considered to be NASCAR pioneers: Tim, Fonty and Bob Flock. She was married to Charlie Mobley, who fielded Tim's car in NASCAR's modified series.

== Racing career ==
Mobley raced in over 100 NASCAR Modified events in her career.

Mobley had two Strictly Stock Series starts. She raced against her brothers at NASCAR's second event ever on July 10, 1949 at the Daytona Beach Road Course.

The event was the first to feature a brother and a sister, and the only NASCAR event to feature four siblings. Ethel beat Fonty and Bob by finishing eleventh (her career high), and Tim finished second. She made her only other career Cup start at Langhorne Speedway and finished 44th. Both events featured three female drivers (Sara Christian and Louise Smith).

In June 1949, Mobley entered a racing competition in Florida, competing against 57 men drivers. She finished in eighth place.

On August 7, 1949, Mobley became the first female racecar driver to compete against men in the state of Georgia when she entered a race at Central City Park Speedway in Macon, Georgia. She was rated as the top woman driver in the southeastern United States, having won many competitions in all-women races.

== Motorsports career results ==
=== NASCAR ===
(key) (Bold – Pole position awarded by qualifying time. Italics – Pole position earned by points standings or practice time. * – Most laps led.)

==== Strictly Stock Series ====
NASCAR Strictly Stock Series results
Year	Team	No.	Make	1	2	3	4	5	6	7	8	NSSC	Pts	Ref
1949	Charles Mobley	91	Cadillac	CLT	DAB; 11	HBO						52nd	16	
1949	Charles Mobley	92	Cadillac				LAN; 44	HAM	MAR	HEI	NWS	52nd	16	
