= Pat Kirkwood =

Pat Kirkwood may refer to:

- Pat Kirkwood (actress) (1921–2007), British stage actress, singer and dancer
- Pat Kirkwood (racing driver) (1927–2001), NASCAR driver
