= Kenneth Wagner =

Kenneth, Kenny, or Ken Wagner may refer to:

- Kenny Wagner American 20th century murder
- Kenneth Wagner (racing driver) an American Stock car (NASCAR) driver
