= Kenneth Wagner (racing driver) =

American race car driver

- Born: Kenneth Wayne Wagner; September 19, 1917; Caldwell, Ohio, U.S.
- Died: March 1, 1981 (aged 63); Philadelphia, Pennsylvania, U.S.

NASCAR Cup Series career
- 9 races run over 3 years
- Best finish: 50th (1949)
- First race: 1949 Race No. 6 (Martinsville)
- Last race: 1956 Langhorn 150 (Langhorne)
Wins	Top tens	Poles
0	1	1

Kenneth Wayne Wagner (September 19, 1917 – March 1, 1981) was an American stock car racing driver from the early NASCAR Cup Series years, competing in NASCAR's inaugural season. He won the first pole position at the season finale 1949 Wilkes 200.

== Career ==
Wagner's NASCAR debut came in 1949, when he competed at Martinsville Speedway. He competed in three races in 1949 at Martinsville, Heidelberg Raceway (near Pittsburgh), and North Wilkesboro Speedway. He took the pole position for the Wilkes 200, the first ever pole position at North Wilkesboro for the NASCAR Cup Series. Wagner then raced three more times in the 1950 season with a best start of fourth at Langhorne Speedway and a tenth place at the second Langhorne race. He finished tenth at the Langhorne circle for his only top-ten career finish. He also competed in the inaugural Southern 500 at Darlington where he finished 70th of 78 cars. Wagner would skip several years before his next NASCAR race in 1956. He raced three times in 1956: Daytona Beach Road Course, Wilson Speedway, and his final NASCAR start at Langhorne.

== Personal life ==
Wagner was born in Caldwell, Ohio but lived and was based out of Pennington, New Jersey. He died in Philadelphia on March 1, 1981. He had three sons, Kenneth, John, and Raymond, who died aboard Pan Am Flight 103 over Lockerbie as he was the co-captain aboard the plane.
