= Sara Christian =

American racing driver (1918–1980)

- Born: Sara Williams; August 25, 1918; Dahlonega, Georgia, U.S.
- Died: March 7, 1980 (age 61); Dahlonega, Georgia, U.S.
- Awards: 1949 United States Drivers Association Woman Driver of the Year inducted in the Georgia Automobile Racing Hall of Fame in 2004

NASCAR Cup Series career
- 7 races run over 2 years
- Best finish: 13th (1949)
- First race: 1949 Race No. 1 (Charlotte)
- Last race: 1950 Hamburg (NY) Speedway
Wins	Top tens	Poles
0	2	0

Sara Williams Christian (August 25, 1918 – March 7, 1980) was the first female driver in NASCAR history.

== Driving career ==
Christian raced at the Looper Speedway, the former racetrack which now lies beneath the waters of Lake Lanier. She won at least one race there while driving a car belonging to racetrack owner Max Looper. Edwin Looper, Max’s nephew, and former employee recalled that Christian’s victory “made all the men mad too, her being a woman and all, and winning the race.”

=== 1949 ===
Christian competed in NASCAR's first race on June 19, 1949, at Charlotte Speedway. She qualified 13th in the No. 71 Ford owned by her husband Frank Christian. During the race, Bob Flock took over her car after his engine expired on the 38th lap. He drove the car until it overheated, and finished 14th.

Christian competed in the second race at the Daytona Beach Road Course on July 10, 1949, and finished 18th. The 28 car field also included Flock's sister Ethel Mobley and Louise Smith, which made it the first race to include three woman drivers. Frank also competed in the race and finished sixth in his only career start. They became the only married couple to compete in a NASCAR race until 1986 when Patty Moise and Elton Sawyer competed for the first time together in the NASCAR Busch Grand National Series. Patty and Elton were married in 1990 and continued to compete against one another for years.

Christian finished sixth at the fourth race at Langhorne Speedway, and became the first woman to earn a top-ten finish. Race winner Curtis Turner invited Christian to join him in victory lane. Mobley and Smith again competed against Christian in the race, and it was the last NASCAR race to have three woman drivers until July 4, 1977, when Janet Guthrie, Christine Beckers, and Lella Lombardi all competed in the Firecracker 400.

Christian finished fifth at the ninth race at Heidelberg Raceway in Pittsburgh, Pennsylvania. The finish was the best-ever and only top-five finish by a woman in NASCAR series history, though on a regional series level it was eclipsed by Shawna Robinson at the New Asheville Speedway on June 10, 1988, when she won the Charlotte-Daytona Dash (a 4-cylinder class) AC-Delco 100 to become the first woman to win a NASCAR touring series race. Christian's fifth-place remains the highest finish by a woman at the Premiership, now known as the NASCAR Cup Series.

Christian raced in six of the eight events in the 1949 season and finished 13th in the final points standings.

=== 1950 ===
Christian competed in one event in 1950, finishing 14th at the 12th race at the Hamburg Speedway before she retired.

== Awards ==
- She received the 1949 United States Drivers Association Woman Driver of the Year award.
- She was inducted into the Georgia Automobile Racing Hall of Fame in 2004.

== Motorsports career results ==
=== NASCAR ===
(key) (Bold – Pole position awarded by qualifying time. Italics – Pole position earned by points standings or practice time. * – Most laps led.)

==== Grand National Series ====
NASCAR Grand National Series results
Year	Team	No.	Make	1	2	3	4	5	6	7	8	9	10	11	12	13	14	15	16	17	18	19	NGNC	Pts	Ref
1949	Frank Christian	71	Ford	CLT; 14		OCC; 23																	13th	282	
1949	Ruby Flock	17	Ford		DAB; 18																		13th	282	
1949	Frank Christian	71	Olds				LAN; 6	HAM	MAR		NWS; 12												13th	282	
1949	Frank Christian	1	Ford							HEI; 5													13th	282	
1950	Frank Christian	71	Ford	DAB	CLT	LAN	MAR	CAN	VER	DAY	MON	CLT	OCC	DAY	HAM; 14	DAR	LAN	NWS	VER	MAR	WIN	OCC	107th	0	
