= Van Van Wey =

American racing driver (1924–1991)

- Born: July 9, 1924; West Terre Haute, Indiana, U.S.
- Died: July 14, 1991 (aged 66); San Diego, California, U.S.

NASCAR Cup Series career
- 4 races run over 2 years
- Best finish: 54th – 1954 NASCAR Grand National Series season
- First race: 1954 Southern 500 (Darlington Raceway)
- Last race: 1955 Southern 500 (Darlington Raceway)
Wins	Top tens	Poles
0	0	0

Van Van Wey (July 9, 1924 – July 14, 1991) was a NASCAR Grand National Series driver from West Terre Haute, Indiana, USA.

== Career ==
Van Wey occasionally drove in the 1954 and 1955 seasons predominantly in his #10 Ford vehicle owned by Ray Fletcher.

Van Wey's driving experience consisted of 876 laps of racing – the equivalent of 1,140.6 miles or 1,835.6 kilometres of racing action. Starting an average of 40th place and finishing an average of 26th, Wey earned exactly $555 in career winnings ($6,670.34 when adjusted for inflation). One of his notable appearances was at the 1955 Southern 500, one of the most prestigious NASCAR races before the inaugural running of the Daytona 500. During his career, Van Wey qualified for all of his races.
