= Otis Martin =

American racing driver (1918–1955)

- Born: March 1, 1918; Bassett, Virginia, US
- Died: November 21, 1955 (aged 37); Near Bassett, Virginia, US
- Cause of death: Car accident

NASCAR Cup Series career
- 23 races run over 6 years
- Best finish: 22nd (1953)
- First race: 1949 Race No. 1 (Charlotte)
- Last race: 1954 Southern 500 (Darlington)
Wins	Top tens	Poles
0	6	0

Otis Mason Martin (March 1, 1918 – November 21, 1955) was an American stock car racing driver. One of the pioneers of the NASCAR Grand National Series, he competed in 23 races over the first six years of the sport, with a best finish of sixth; he finished fifth in a non-sanctioned event in October 1949.

Martin, a native of Bassett, Virginia was known as a mountain man and raced wearing bib overalls. He died in a car accident on Virginia State Route 57 on November 21, 1955.
