= Joe Littlejohn =

American NASCAR driver

- Born: January 3, 1908; Pacolet, South Carolina, U.S.
- Died: July 29, 1989 (aged 81); Spartanburg, South Carolina, U.S.

NASCAR Cup Series career
- 2 races run over 2 years
- Best finish: 22nd (1949)
- First race: 1949 Race 2 (Daytona Beach)
- Last race: 1950 Race 1 (Daytona Beach)
Wins	Top tens	Poles
0	1	1

Joe Littlejohn (January 3, 1908 – July 29, 1989) was an American stock car racing driver from Spartanburg, South Carolina. He competed in the NASCAR Grand National Division in 1949 and 1950.

== Career ==
Littlejohn raced in two races at Daytona Beach in 1949 and 1950, earning a fourth-place finish in 1949 and the pole position in 1950. He was the promoter at Piedmont Interstate Fairgrounds starting in 1939 until the track's final NASCAR Grand National race in 1966.

== Death and legacy ==
Littlejohn died in his home in Spartanburg, South Carolina on July 29, 1989, having suffered a heart attack.

The National Motorsport Press Association (NMPA) awards an annual "Joe Littlejohn Award". The award is handed out to someone who has made an outstanding contribution to the NMPA and motorsports.
