= Fred Johnson (racing driver) =

American racing driver (1929–1991)

- Born: December 11, 1929; Hamptonville, North Carolina, U.S.
- Died: January 7, 1991 (aged 61)

NASCAR Cup Series career
- 7 races run over 4 years
- Best finish: 60th (1950)
- First race: 1949 race at Charlotte Speedway
- Last race: 1956 race at Road America
Wins	Top tens	Poles
0	2	0

Fred Johnson (December 11, 1929 – January 7, 1991) was an American NASCAR Grand National Series driver from Hamptonville, North Carolina. He was the brother of NASCAR Hall of Fame inductee Junior Johnson.

== Biography ==
Johnson and brother Junior grew up as bootleggers before starting racing careers. In May 1949, Fred and Bill France Sr. attended the opening of Charlotte Speedway, which hosted the NASCAR Strictly Stock Series' inaugural race later that year. Johnson finished in 25th place out of 33 racing vehicles while driving a 1947 Ford vehicle.

Johnson's NASCAR career spanned from 1949 to 1956. He achieved two top-ten finishes after completing 562 laps; earning $910 in the process ($10,776.32 when adjusted for inflation). Johnson's average start is 20th place while his average finish is 24th place. At NASCAR's first-ever Cup Series race, Johnson

At the 1955 Southern 500, Johnson qualified in 22nd place and ended up finishing in 46th place out of the 69 drivers on the racing grid; collecting $260 in the process ($3,124.84 when adjusted for inflation). Johnson's chosen vehicle was a 1955 Cadillac. He and Junior were teammates at B&L Motors, with Junior driving an Oldsmobile outside of a brief car switch during the season.

The best finishes of Johnson's career occurred on road courses where he finished in 18th place on average. Intermediate tracks were considered to be his weakness; where he achieved a 46th-place finish on average. Road America was Johnson's favored racecourse; where he finished in ninth place at the series' only visit (as of 2020). Darlington Raceway was Johnson's least successful track where he achieved an average finishing position of 46th place.

After ending his career, Johnson worked as a farm manager for Junior Johnson & Associates.
