= Ray Erickson =

American racing driver (1918–2002)

- Born: April 5, 1918; Chicago, Illinois, U.S.
- Died: November 28, 2002 (aged 84)

NASCAR Cup Series career
- 12 races run over 5 years
- Best finish: 7th – 1949
- First race: 1949 Race #5 (Hamburg)
- Last race: 1953 Race #37 (Lakewood)
| Wins | Top tens | Poles |
|---|---|---|
| 0 | 3 | 0 |

Ray Erickson (April 5, 1918 – November 28, 2002) was an American stock car racing driver. A Chicago, Illinois native, he ran four races in the inaugural season of the NASCAR Strictly Stock Series, finishing seventh in points with a best finish of second in his debut at Hamburg Speedway. Due in part to losing his arm in a hot rod accident in 1950, he would only run eight more races over the next four years, finishing no better than 17th.

Erickson was the listed owner of the #3 Hudson Hornet of Dick Rathmann for Rathmann's victory at Oakland in 1954.
