= Jack White (racing driver) =

American racing driver (1920–1988)

- Born: May 14, 1920; Lockport, New York, U.S.
- Died: November 23, 1988 (aged 68); Lockport, New York, U.S.

NASCAR Cup Series career
- 12 races run over 3 years
- Best finish: 18th (1949)
- First race: 1949 Race #5 (Hamburg)
- Last race: 1951 Race #22 (Morristown)
- First win: 1949 Race #5 (Hamburg)
Wins	Top tens	Poles
1	3	0

Jack White (May 14, 1920 – November 23, 1988) was an American stock car racing driver who drove from 1949 to 1951. A native of Lockport, New York, he competed in the NASCAR Grand National Division, winning one race at Hamburg Speedway in the series' inaugural season of 1949.
