= Frank Christian (NASCAR owner) =

Former NASCAR team owner

- Born: October 3, 1910; Atlanta, Georgia, U.S.
- Died: December 8, 1969 (aged 59)

NASCAR Cup Series career
- 1 race run over 1 year
- Best finish: 26th (1949)
- First race: 1949 Race 2 (Daytona Beach)
| Wins | Top tens | Poles |
|---|---|---|
| 0 | 1 | 0 |

Frank Christian (October 23, 1910 — December 8, 1969) was a NASCAR race car owner who owned a series of stock car vehicles from 1949 to 1955. Christian finished sixth in his only NASCAR race start (1949-03).

Christian was also the husband of former NASCAR Grand National Series driver Sara Christian in addition to being a businessman and a provider of illegal alcoholic beverages. During his adult life, he resided in Atlanta, Georgia where he would base his legitimate businessman career from.

== Career ==
As a pioneer in multi-car ownership, Christian would lead the way for the modern day "super teams" like Hendrick Motorsports.

Christian earned $81,285 in monetary prizes as an owner ($976,934.63 when adjusted for inflation) in addition to winning 22 races. Notable drivers under his employment included: Speedy Thompson, Buddy Shuman, Banjo Matthews, Fonty Flock, Gober Sosebee, Buck Baker, and Curtis Turner. Christian even did several races as a driver/owner; adding to the lap total of 21,804 that his vehicles did while under his ownership. Out of all these laps, only 5220 were by Christian's drivers.

However, Christian's vehicles did do well in finishing races as the average starting position was sixth place and the average finishing position was twelfth place. Pole positions were plentiful for Christian's vehicles, as they managed to accumulate 35 pole positions within six years.

== Motorsports career results ==
=== NASCAR ===
(key) (Bold – Pole position awarded by qualifying time. Italics – Pole position earned by points standings or practice time. * – Most laps led.)

==== Strictly Stock Series ====
NASCAR Strictly Stock Series results
| Year | Team | No. | Make | 1 | 2 | 3 | 4 | 5 | 6 | 7 | 8 | NSSC | Pts | Ref |
|---|---|---|---|---|---|---|---|---|---|---|---|---|---|---|
| 1949 | Frank Christian | 37 | Olds | CLT | DAB; 6 | HBO | LAN | HAM | MAR | HEI | NWS | 26th | 100 | |
