= 1954 Southern 500 =

Auto race held at Darlington Raceway in 1954

Race details
- Race 31 of 37 in the 1954 NASCAR Grand National Series season
- 1954 Southern 500 program cover
- Date: September 6, 1954
- Official name: Southern 500
- Location: Darlington Raceway, Darlington, South Carolina
- Course: Permanent racing facility
- Course length: 1.375 miles (2.221 km)
- Distance: 400 laps, 500 mi (800 km)
- Weather: Extremely hot with temperatures of 100 °F (38 °C); wind speeds of 10.1 miles per hour (16.3 km/h)
- Average speed: 95.206 miles per hour (153.219 km/h)

Pole position
| Driver | Buck Baker | Bob Griffin |
- Time: 18.289 seconds

Most laps led
| Driver | Curtis Turner | Elmer Brooks |
- Laps: 266

Winner
| No. 92 | Herb Thomas | Herb Thomas |

Television in the United States
- Network: WJMX (local AM radio)
- Announcers: Local radio announcers

The 1954 Southern 500, the fifth running of the event, was a NASCAR Grand National Series event that was held on September 6, 1954, at Darlington Raceway in Darlington, South Carolina.

The race car drivers still had to commute to the races using the same stock cars that competed in a typical weekend's race through a policy of homologation (and under their own power). This policy was in effect until roughly 1975. By 1980, NASCAR had completely stopped tracking the year model of all the vehicles and most teams did not take stock cars to the track under their own power anymore.

== Background ==
Darlington Raceway, nicknamed by many NASCAR fans and drivers as "The Lady in Black" or "The Track Too Tough to Tame" and advertised as a "NASCAR Tradition", is a race track built for NASCAR racing located near Darlington, South Carolina. It is of a unique, somewhat egg-shaped design, an oval with the ends of very different configurations, a condition which supposedly arose from the proximity of one end of the track to a minnow pond the owner refused to relocate. This situation makes it very challenging for the crews to set up their cars' handling in a way that will be effective at both ends.

The track is a four-turn 1.366 miles (2.198 km) oval. The track's first two turns are banked at twenty-five degrees, while the final two turns are banked two degrees lower at twenty-three degrees. The front stretch (the location of the finish line) and the back stretch is banked at six degrees. Darlington Raceway can seat up to 60,000 people.

Darlington has something of a legendary quality among drivers and older fans; this is probably due to its long track length relative to other NASCAR speedways of its era and hence the first venue where many of them became cognizant of the truly high speeds that stock cars could achieve on a long track. The track allegedly earned the moniker The Lady in Black because the night before the race the track maintenance crew would cover the entire track with fresh asphalt sealant, in the early years of the speedway, thus making the racing surface dark black. Darlington is also known as "The Track Too Tough to Tame" because drivers can run lap after lap without a problem and then bounce off of the wall the following lap. Racers will frequently explain that they have to race the racetrack, not their competition. Drivers hitting the wall are considered to have received their "Darlington Stripe" thanks to the missing paint on the right side of the car.

== Race report ==
There were 364 laps done on a paved oval track that spanned 1.375 miles (2.213 km). Van Van Wey would make his NASCAR debut in this race; starting in 43rd place and ending in 20th place due to a crash on the 260th lap of the race. Buck Baker ran into trouble early in the race. Baker later drove relief for Laird Bruner and finished in 23rd position. Lee Petty experienced fuel pump trouble and later drove relief for Marvin Panch and crossed the finish line in third-place position.

Otis Martin, Buck Mason, and Frank Stutts would retire from professional stock car racing while Walt Harvey and Joe Sheppard would make their only NASCAR Cup Series appearance in this event. Drivers who failed to qualify for the race were: Bill Blair (#2), Parks Surratt (#00), Bill Morgan (#77), Jim Graham (#72), Fred Dove (#71), Ken Taylor (#62), Gober Sosebee (#51), Hank Carruthers (#50), Clyde Minter (#19), Donald Thomas (#9), Dick Rathmann (#3) and Ross Morrison (#05).

Overall, the race took five hours, sixteen minutes, and one second from the first green flag to the checkered flag. The average speed was 95.026 miles per hour (152.930 km/h) and the pole speed was 108.261 miles per hour (174.229 km/h). There were two cautions for four laps and the margin of victory was twenty-six seconds. Attendance of the race was confirmed at 28,000 people during the start of the race. Notable racers that appeared in the race and didn't finish in the "top ten" included Lee Petty (whose streak of 36 top-ten finishes ended at this race), Cotton Owens, Jimmie Lewallen, Ralph Liguori, Arden Mounts, Elmo Langley, and Buck Baker (pole winner). There was a 1949 year model car in this race. Apparently, there wasn't anything in the NASCAR Cup Series regulations at that time against racing with an obsolete vehicle but it wasn't really competitive against the newer models. Hassell Reid would end up with a 49th place finish while driving the 1949 Plymouth vehicle.

Elmo Langley makes his NASCAR debut. He'd score two victories in a career spanning 536 races from 1954 to 1981.

This would be the first Southern 500 where the leader wasn't a lap or more ahead. There were two #20 cars in the race which would be illegal under current NASCAR Cup Series rules and regulations.

The total winnings of the race was $27,405 ($328,554 when adjusted for inflation) with the winner taking home $6,830 in winnings ($81,884 when adjusted for inflation). Manufacturers involved in the race included Hudson (defunct), Oldsmobile (defunct), Dodge (active), Mercury (defunct), Cadillac (active but not racing), Buick (active but not racing), Nash (defunct), Plymouth (active but not racing), Studebaker (defunct), Chrysler (active but not racing), Ford (active), but no entry by any Chevrolet (active) vehicles.

Robert Foster and Lee Petty were two of the notable crew chiefs that were in attendance for the race. Not only Lee Petty was the crew chief, but he was also driving the #42 Chrysler vehicle in the race.

=== Qualifying ===
| Grid | No. | Driver | Manufacturer | Speed | Qualifying time | Owner |
|---|---|---|---|---|---|---|
| 1 | 87 | Buck Baker | '54 Oldsmobile | 108.261 | 18.289 | Bob Griffin |
| 2 | 25 | Fireball Roberts | '53 Oldsmobile | 105.549 | 18.757 | Leland Colvin |
| 3 | 14 | Hershel McGriff | '54 Oldsmobile | 105.375 | 18.790 | Frank Christian |
| 4 | 28 | Eddie Skinner | '53 Oldsmobile | 95.009 | 20.840 | Frank Dodge |
| 5 | 26 | Dave Terrell | '54 Dodge | 87.013 | 22.275 | Dave Terrell |
| 6 | 97 | Bill Amick | '54 Oldsmobile | 105.611 | 18.748 | Frank Christian |
| 7 | 40 | John Soares | '54 Dodge | 96.270 | 20.567 | Charles Vance |
| 8 | 4 | Ken Fisher | '54 Hudson | 96.247 | 20.572 | Ken Fisher |
| 9 | 8 | Gene Comstock | '52 Hudson | 93.163 | 21.253 | Gene Comstock |
| 10 | 93 | Ted Chamberlain | '53 Chrysler | 87.709 | 22.574 | Ted Chamberlain |

== Finishing order ==
Section reference:

1. Herb Thomas
2. Curtis Turner
3. Marvin Panch
4. Johnny Patterson
5. Jim Paschal
6. John Soares
7. Fireball Roberts
8. Gwyn Staley
9. Joel Million
10. Speedy Thompson
11. Arden Mounts
12. Elmo Langley
13. Gene Comstock
14. Eddie Skinner
15. Joe Eubanks
16. Elton Hildreth
17. Bill Widenhouse
18. Harvey Eakin
19. Bill Amick
20. Charlie Cregar
21. Art Watts
22. George Parrish
23. Laird Bruner
24. Jims Gillette
25. Otis Martin
26. Walt Harvey
27. Buck Mason
28. Charles Brinkley
29. Van Van Wey
30. Ralph Liguori
31. Ted Chamberlain
32. Frank Stutts
33. Dave Terrell
34. Cotton Owens
35. Pop McGinnis
36. Dean Pelton
37. Joe Sheppard
38. Lee Petty
39. Erick Erickson
40. Ken Fisher
41. Jimmie Lewallen
42. Dink Widenhouse
43. Blackie Pitt
44. Buck Baker
45. Hershel McGriff
46. John McGinley
47. Danny Letner
48. Bob Welborn
49. Hassell Reid
50. Jimmy Thompson

== Timeline ==
Section reference:

- Start: Buck Baker was leading the starting grid as the green flag was waved in the air.
- Lap 35: Bill Amick took over the lead from Buck Baker.
- Lap 44: Curtis Turner took over the lead from Bill Amick.
- Lap 130: Charlie Cregar took over the lead from Curtis Turner.
- Lap 138: Pop McGinnis took over the lead from Charlie Cregar.
- Lap 142: Curtis Turner took over the lead from Pop McGinnis.
- Lap 191: Herb Thomas took over the lead from Curtis Turner.
- Lap 204: Curtis Turner took over the lead from Herb Thomas.
- Lap 216: Dean Pelton's vehicle blew a gasket while racing at high speeds.
- Lap 221: Pop McGinnis' vehicle ran out of fuel.
- Lap 228: Cotton Owens fell out with engine failure.
- Lap 231: Dave Terrell managed to ruin the rear end of his vehicle.
- Lap 260: Van Van Wey was involved in a terminal crash.
- Lap 268: Charles Brinkley fell out with engine failure.
- Lap 298: Herb Thomas took over the lead from Curtis Turner.
- Lap 302: Curtis Turner took over the lead from Herb Thomas.
- Lap 308: Herb Thomas took over the lead from Curtis Turner.
- Lap 314: Curtis Turner took over the lead from Herb Thomas.
- Lap 345: Herb Thomas took over the lead from Curtis Turner.
- Finish: Herb Thomas was officially declared the winner of the event.

| Preceded by 1953 | Southern 500 races 1954 | Succeeded by 1955 |

| Previous race: 1954 NASCAR Grand National Series race at Corbin Speedway | NASCAR Grand National Series; 1954 season | Next race: 1954 NASCAR Grand National Series race at Central City Speedway (September) |
