= Wyoming County International Speedway =

Motorsport venue in Perry, New York

The Bullring
- Location: Perry, New York
- Coordinates: 42°43′20″N 78°03′24″W
- Operator: James E. Majchrzak
- Broke ground: 1959
- Opened: 1960
- Former names: Perry Speedway
- Website: www.thebullringwcis.com

Oval
- Surface: Asphalt
- Length: .536 km (0.333 mi)
- Turns: 4

Wyoming County International Speedway (WCIS) is a 0.333-mile (0.536 km) asphalt oval racetrack located in Western New York, USA.

== Overview ==
The speedway was built in 1959, and opened in 1960 as a dirt racetrack called Perry Speedway. The surface was paved in 1968, and the concrete retaining wall constructed. In 1985, the macadam was once again covered with a layer of dirt for a time period of 13 years.

In 1998, under new ownership, WCIS returned to the highly competitive Super Short Track (SST) asphalt racing surface. Racing occurs every Saturday night at the Bullring.

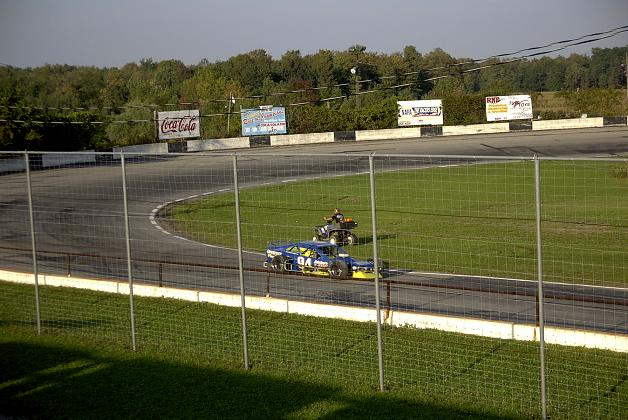
Wayne Lent Racing at Wyoming County Int'l Speedway.

== Events ==
The speedway features the SST Asphalt Modifieds and Superstocks, along with the 6 cylinder and 4 cylinder Stocks and Mini-stocks.

WCIS also hosts the Race of Champions series periodically during the racing season.

== Track operators ==
Promoter: James E. Majchrzak
Race Director: Don Vogler
General Manager: Polly Majchrzak
Secretary: Shawna Smith
Marketing:
Chief Medical Director: George Deaton
Ambulance EMT: Chris Gray
Announcers: Pete Zehler and Dan Turner
Scorers: Rachel Babbit, Charolette Pringle and Rachel Horvatits
Photographer: Rob Micoli
Tech Inspectors: Ron Roberts
Head Starter: Steve Ott
Flaggers: Mike Jones, Don Packman, Doug Packman
Infield Director: Joe Horvatits
Safety Crew: Mike Adamczak, Bob Jones, Dan Olin, Darryl Jones, Joe Horvatits Jr. and Rich Fraser
