= Pat Kirkwood (racing driver) =

American NASCAR driver (1927–2001)

Patrick "Pat" Kirkwood
- Born: December 22, 1927; Fort Worth, Texas, U.S.
- Died: February 9, 2001 (aged 73)

NASCAR Cup Series career
- 9 races run over 4 years
- Best finish: 33rd (1956)
- First race: 1949 Race 4 (Langhorne)
- Last race: 1957 Race 4 (Daytona Beach)
Wins	Top tens	Poles
0	4	1

Patrick Kirkwood (December 22, 1927 – February 9, 2001) was an American NASCAR Grand National Driver from 1949 to 1957.

== Career ==
=== As a driver ===
Kirkwood competed in the first season of what is now known as the NASCAR Cup Series. He completed 1479 laps and 1,899.6 miles (3,057.1 km) of stock car racing action during his four non-consecutive year career. On average, Kirkwood started and finished a race in 15th place with total career earnings of $3290 ($37,714.16 when adjusted for inflation). In 1956, Kirkwood finished 56th in the entire season's championship standings. However, he did worse in 1957 with a final result of 178th in that season's championship standings. Although Kirkwood never won a race or a championship, Kirkwood competed in NASCAR during its unregulated and highly unsponsored era. Funding for teams and drivers was so sparse back then that none of the teams could race in all eight races of the 1949 NASCAR Strictly Stock season.

=== As an owner ===
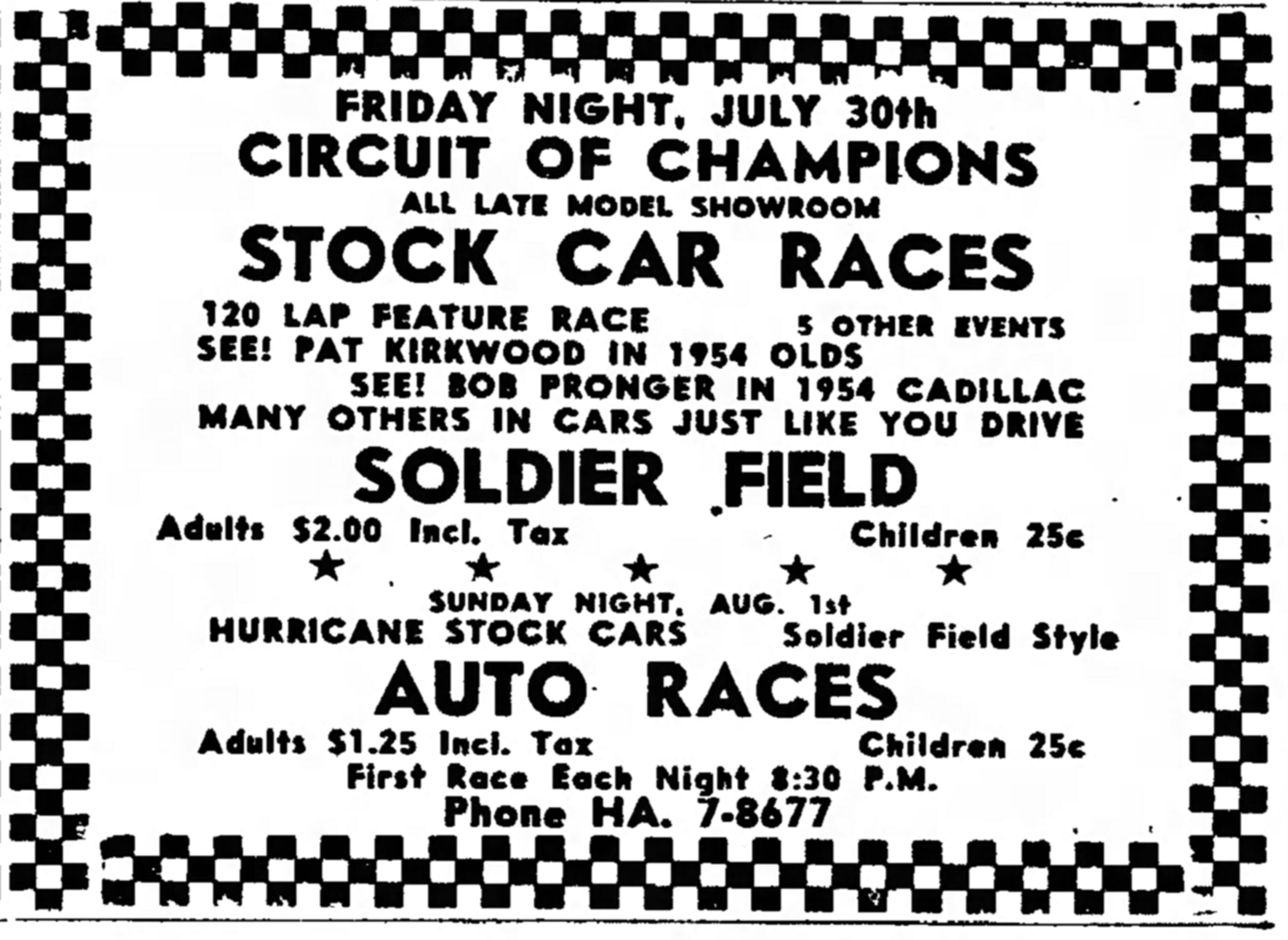
An advertisement for a race at Soldier Field which mentions Kirkwood

Kirkwood was also briefly a NASCAR owner, fielding entries for himself in one race in the 1949 season in addition to four races in the 1952 season. The vehicles under his ownership managed to earn two finishes in the top-five, two finishes in the top-ten, one pole position, 764 laps of racing, and 971.9 miles (1,564.1 km) of experience. With an average start of 14th and an average finish of 15th, Kirkwood's vehicles had an average finish for the time.
