= Bill Blair (racing driver) =

American racing driver (1911–1995)

- Born: July 14, 1911; High Point, North Carolina, U.S.
- Died: November 2, 1995 (aged 84); High Point, North Carolina, U.S.

NASCAR Cup Series career
- 123 races run over 10 years
- Best finish: 4th (1949)
- First race: 1949 Race No. 1 (Charlotte)
- Last race: 1958 Lakewood Speedway (Atlanta)
- First win: 1950 Vernon Fairgrounds (Vernon, NY)
- Last win: 1953 Daytona Beach
| Wins | Top tens | Poles |
|---|---|---|
| 3 | 54 | 1 |
- Statistics up to date as of August 11, 2025.

William Ivey Blair (July 14, 1911 – November 2, 1995) was an American stock car racing driver in the 1940s and the 1950s, and he was one of the pioneers of NASCAR.

== Racing career ==
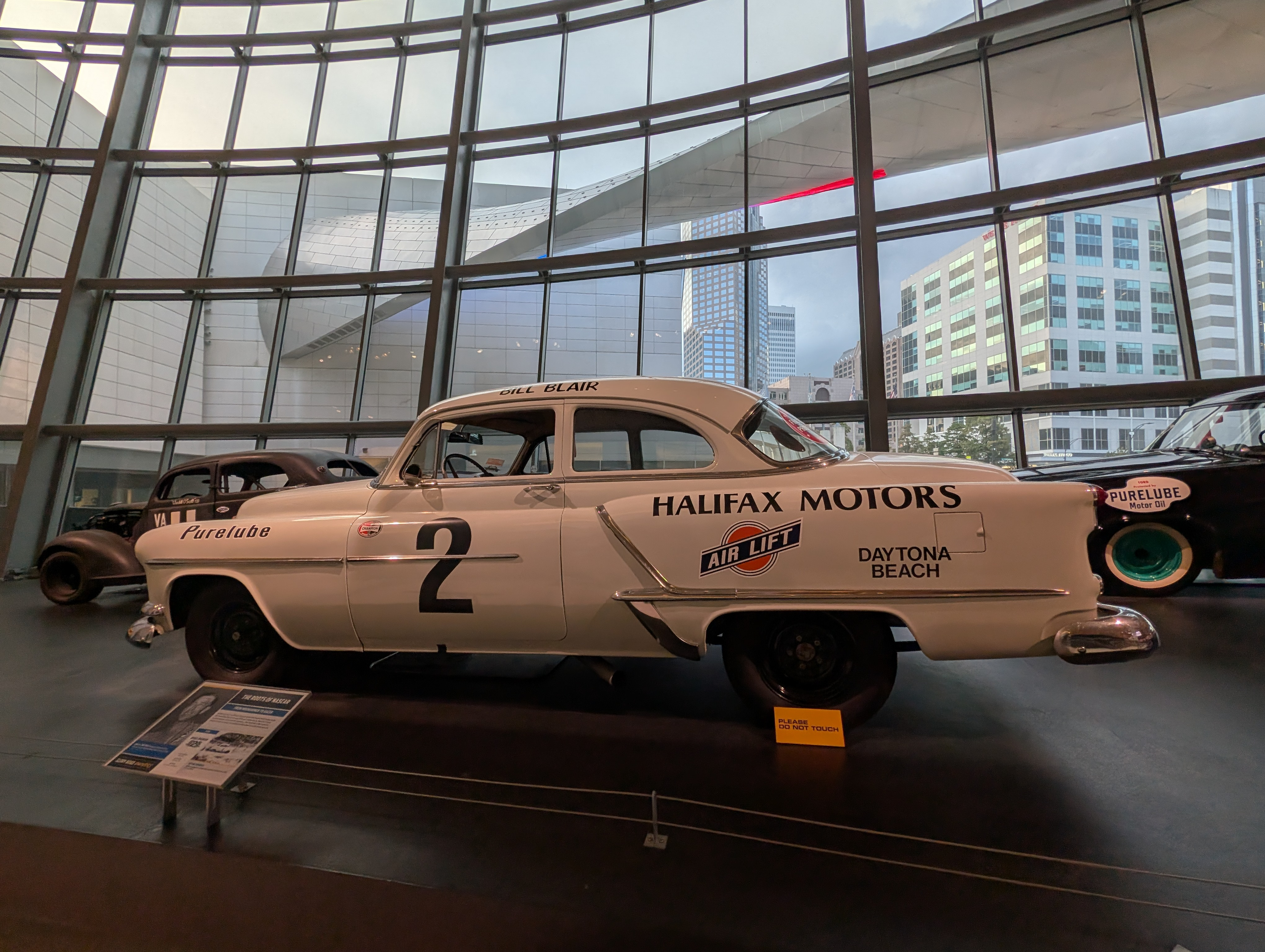
Bill Blair's Super 88 Oldsmobile in the NASCAR Hall of Fame, Charlotte NC

Blair started his racing career as a bootlegger in the 1930s. In 1939, he began racing at the newly-constructed High Point Speedway, and he opened his own track Tri-City Speedway after World War II.

Blair won three NASCAR Strictly Stock/Grand National races:

- June 18, 1950 – Blair piloted a 1950 Mercury owned by Sam Rice to victory in a race at Vernon Fairgrounds in Vernon, NY.
- April 20, 1952 – Blair drove a 1952 Oldsmobile owned by George Hutchens to his second win at Lakewood Speedway in Atlanta, GA.
- February 15, 1953 – In his final series victory, Blair drove his 1953 Oldsmobile to victory lane at the Beach & Road Course in Daytona Beach, FL.

== Memorial ==
Blair, Jimmie Lewallen, and Fred Harb are the subject of the independent movie "Red Dirt Rising" which is based on the book Red Dirt Tracks: The Forgotten Heroes of Early Stockcar Racing by Gail Cauble Gurley.
