= Tommy Coates =

American stock car racer

Tommy Coates (May 28, 1909 - November 1, 1980) was an American stock car racer.

Born in San Antonio Texas, Coates was the 1951 Langhorne NASCAR sportsman champion on the 1/4 mile Yellow Jacket Circuit. He competed in stock car races in 1940 and 1941. Coates joined the American Stock Car Racing Association (ASCRA) in 1947, becoming secretary of the organization in 1950.
