= 1949 Wilkes 200 =

Auto race run in North Carolina in 1949

Race details
- Race 8 of 8 in the 1949 NASCAR Strictly Stock season
- North Wilkesboro Speedway
- Date: October 16, 1949
- Official name: Wilkes 200
- Location: North Wilkesboro Speedway, North Wilkesboro, North Carolina
- Course: Permanent racing facility
- Course length: 0.500 miles (0.804 km)
- Distance: 200 laps, 100 mi (150 km)
- Weather: Chilly with temperatures reaching up to 68.0 °F (20.0 °C); wind speeds reaching up to 7 miles per hour (11 km/h)
- Average speed: 53.364 miles per hour (85.881 km/h)
- Attendance: 10,000

Pole position
Driver	Kenneth Wagner	(Dailey Moyer owner)
- Time: 31.27 seconds

Most laps led
Driver	Bill Blair	(Sam Rice owner)
- Laps: 180

Winner
No. 7	Bob Flock	(Frank Christian owner)

Television in the United States
- Network: untelevised
- Announcers: none

The 1949 Wilkes 200 was a NASCAR Strictly Stock Series racing event that took place on October 16, 1949 at North Wilkesboro Speedway in North Wilkesboro, North Carolina.

Ten thousand people would attend this live racing event where Kenneth Wagner qualified for the race with a pole position speed of 57.563 miles per hour (92.639 km/h) – the equivalent of 31.27 seconds. The entire race took place on a dirt track spanning 0.500 miles (0.805 km) per lap. Weather conditions for the race were recorded at nearby Hickory Regional Airport; a public airport located three miles (5 km) west of the central business district of nearby Hickory, North Carolina.

== Summary ==
This would be the final race of the 1949 NASCAR season and would take place at North Wilkesboro Speedway in North Wilkesboro, North Carolina.

Bob Flock would defeat Lee Petty by an entire football field – 100 yards (91 m) – to win NASCAR's first racing event with an established name. Flock would earn a mere $1,500 in prize winnings ($20,297.2 when inflation is taken into effect). Frank Mundy would receive a last-place finish for only finishing 38 laps out of the mandated 200 laps. Bill Blair would lead the most laps in this race with 180 laps led out of 200.

Red Byron would go on to win NASCAR's first ever championship while Sara Christian would become one of its first female drivers. Byron almost became a cripple after being shot by an enemy fighter plane while serving as a tail gunner on a B-24 Liberator bomber during World War II. He spent two years in military hospitals rehabilitating his leg so that he could compete in NASCAR after the war ended.

Notable crew chiefs who actively participated in the race were Buddy Elliott, Julian Petty, Buddy Helms, Red Vogt, and Cliff Rainwater.

While Red Byron and Lee Petty were the better drivers of the 1949 NASCAR Cup Series season, Bill Blair was the most consistent driver along with Petty.

=== Timeline ===
Section reference:

- Start of race: Bill Blair starts off the race in the pole position
- Lap 38: Frank Mundy withdrew from the race for reasons unknown
- Lap 155: Red Byron withdrew from the race for reasons unknown, he was assumed not have been paid for participating in this event
- Lap 181: Bob Flock takes over the lead from Bill Blair
- Lap 188: Sara Christian ended the racing event 12 laps behind Herb Thomas
- Lap 191: Bill Blair had a terminal problem with his engine, forcing him out of the race
- Lap 196: Roy Hall may or may not have finished the race six laps behind Thomas, records of this race were not kept in the NASCAR archives
- Finish: Bob Flock was officially declared the winner of the event

== Results ==
POS	ST	#	DRIVER	SPONSOR / OWNER	CAR	LAPS	MONEY	STATUS	LED
1		7	Bob Flock	Bob Flock Garage (Frank Christian)	'49 Oldsmobile	200	1500	running	20
2		42	Lee Petty	Petty Enterprises	'49 Plymouth	200	750	running	0
3		47	Fonty Flock	Green Leaf Cafe (Ed Lawrence)	'47 Buick	199	400	running	0
4		19	Clyde Minter	Clyde Minter	'47 Ford	199	300	running	0
5		92	Herb Thomas	Herb Thomas	'49 Ford	197	175	running	0
6		14	Roy Hall	Parks Novelty (Raymond Parks)	'49 Oldsmobile	196	150		0
7		5	Ray Erickson	Ed Hastings	'49 Mercury	194	100		0
8		9	Raymond Lewis	Robert Dixon	'49 Cadillac	194	75		0
9		41	Curtis Turner	Frank Christian	'49 Oldsmobile	193	50		0
10	2	44	Bill Blair	Sam Rice	'49 Cadillac	191	50	engine	180
11		11	Bob Apperson	Bob Apperson	'47 Ford	191	50		0
12		71	Sara Christian	Frank Christian	'49 Oldsmobile	188	50		0
13		28	Slick Smith	Buddy Helms	'47 Hudson	174	50		0
14		20	H.F. Stikeleather		'48 Lincoln	167	50		0
15	1	15	Kenneth Wagner	Moyer Co. (Dailey Moyer)	'49 Lincoln	165	50		0
16		22	Red Byron	Parks Novelty (Raymond Parks)	Oldsmobile	155			0
17		21	Bobby Green	Bobby Greene	'48 Ford	148			0
18		1	Bill Greever		'48 Mercury	134			0
19		90	Tim Flock	Buddy Elliott	'49 Oldsmobile	117			0
20		8	Dick Linder	LaBelle Motors	'49 Kaiser	59			0
21		4	Otis Martin	Raymond Lewis	'47 Buick	50			0
22		2	Frank Mundy		'49 Ford	38			0

=== Race summary ===
- Lead changes: 2
- Cautions: N/A
- Red flags: N/A
- Time of race: 1 hours, 52 minutes, and 16 seconds
- Average speed: 53.364 miles per hour (85.881 km/h)
- Margin of Victory: 100 yards

Preceded by inaugural race	Wilkes 200 races 1949	Succeeded by 1950
