= Piedmont Interstate Fairgrounds =

Defunct American racing track

- Location: 575 Fairgrounds Road, Spartanburg, South Carolina
- Coordinates: 34.9595254°N 81.9547757°W
- Operator: Joe Littlejohn (1939–1966)
- Opened: 1939
- Website: piedmontinterstatefair.com

oval
- Surface: dirt
- Length: 0.80 km (0.5 mi)
- Turns: 4
- Race lap record: 70.644 mph (Dick Hutcherson, 1965, NASCAR Grand National)

Piedmont Interstate Fairgrounds is a defunct half mile (0.8 km) dirt oval near Spartanburg, South Carolina. The track held NASCAR Grand National races in the 1950s and 1960s.

== History ==
An October 1908 program was found for a horse trotting and racing event at the fair. The first car racing event was held at the track in 1939 and it was promoted by Joe Littlejohn; he promoted events at the track until 1966.

Littlejohn was one of 35 people who attended Bill France Sr.'s 1947 meeting which led to the formation of NASCAR; Piedmont was a major hub in NASCAR's first two decades. It held 22 Grand National Series races between 1953 and 1966 as well as two NASCAR Convertible Series races (1956 and 1957). Afterward the NASCAR races ended, the track held races during the fair in (North America) autumn. The track was regraded in 2002 for a legends race to benefit a local racing museum; by 2005 the idea of a museum was scrapped. According to the local visitor's bureau website (in 2017), the track hasn't held a regular schedule of races for many years (although some of the racing surface remains visible).

== Results ==
=== NASCAR Grand National Series ===
results

Date	Winner	Length (miles)
July 4, 1953	Lee Petty	100
July 3, 1954	Herb Thomas	100
July 6, 1955	Tim Flock	100
July 7, 1956	Lee Petty	100
August 23, 1956	Ralph Moody	100
April 27, 1957	Marvin Panch	100
June 29, 1957	Lee Petty	94
April 12, 1958	Speedy Thompson	100
June 5, 1959	Jack Smith	100
May 28, 1960	Ned Jarrett	100
August 16, 1960	Cotton Owens	100
March 4, 1961	Cotton Owens	100
June 2, 1961	Jim Paschal	100
May 19, 1962	Ned Jarrett	100
August 21, 1962	Richard Petty	100
March 2, 1963	Richard Petty	100
August 14, 1963	Ned Jarrett	100
April 14, 1964	Ned Jarrett	100
June 26, 1964	Richard Petty	100
February 27, 1965	Ned Jarrett	100
August 14, 1965	Ned Jarrett	100
June 4, 1966	Elmo Langley	100

=== NASCAR Convertible Series ===
results

Date	Winner	Length (miles)
September 29, 1956	Curtis Turner	100
May 25, 1957	Curtis Turner	100
