= 1949 NASCAR Strictly Stock Series inaugural race =

NASCAR race

1949 Strictly Stock Race 1
Race details
- Race 1 of 8 in the 1949 NASCAR Strictly Stock Series season
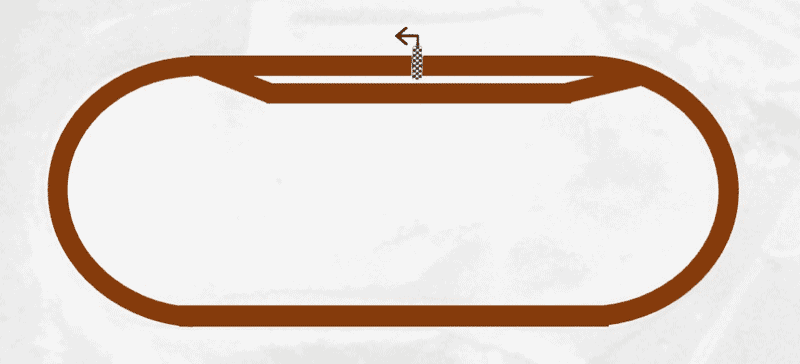
- Date: June 19, 1949
- Location: Charlotte Speedway, Charlotte, North Carolina
- Course: Permanent racing facility
- Course length: 0.75 miles (1.2 km)
- Distance: 200 laps, 150 mi (241.402 km)
- Weather: Hot with temperatures reaching up to 89.1 °F (31.7 °C); with winds being sustained up to 7 miles per hour (11 km/h)

Pole position
| Driver | Bob Flock | Davis Brothers |

Most laps led
| Driver | Bill Blair | R.B. McIntosh |
- Laps: 145

Winner
| No. 34 | Jim Roper | R.B. McIntosh |

The NASCAR Strictly Stock Series inaugural race was the first stock car race sanctioned by the National Association for Stock Car Auto Racing (NASCAR). Held on June 19, 1949 at the Charlotte Speedway in Charlotte, North Carolina, the race comprised 200 laps on a 0.75 mi (1.21 km) dirt oval. Bob Flock won the pole position for the race with a top speed of 67.958 mph (109.368 km/h). Glenn Dunaway initially claimed the victory in his 1947 Ford, but was later disqualified because his car had spread rear springs. The win was instead awarded to Jim Roper, driver of a 1949 Lincoln.

== Race organization ==
The race was run on the same day as competitor NSCRA, operated by NASCAR founder Bill France Sr.'s rival Bruton Smith, held a race in Atlanta. In an attempt to attract drivers from the opposing series, France offered prize money totaling $5,000, with $2,000 going to the race winner. Attendance for the race totaled approximately 13,000, with Houston Lawing, NASCAR's publicity director, stating that over 5,000 fans were not allowed into the stands because the grandstands could not accommodate them. As a result, spectators crossed the track into the infield to watch the race, and state police had to appear to control them.

== Race ==
Pole position was held by Bob Flock, who led for the first five laps before his engine malfunctioned, and Bill Blair took the lead, which he held for 145 laps until Jim Roper took the lead on lap 151. In the end, Glenn Dunaway won, but officials had expressed suspicion over Dunaway's car remaining steady while entering the rugged turns, and it was eventually discovered that car owner Hubert Westmoreland had spread the car's rear springs, a method commonly used by bootleggers to improve handling. Roper, who had finished three laps down, was given the victory, while Dunaway was scored as finishing last. Fonty Flock, Red Byron, Sam Rice and Tim Flock closed out the top five, while the top ten consisted of Archie Smith, Sterling Long, Slick Smith, Curtis Turner and Jimmy Thompson. Westmoreland then sued NASCAR for $10,000, but lost after judge Johnson Jay Hayes tossed it out of court.

== Results ==
| Pos | Grid | No. | Driver | Owner | Manufacturer | Laps | Status |
|---|---|---|---|---|---|---|---|
| 1 | 12 | 34 | Jim Roper | R. B. McIntosh | Lincoln | 197 | Running |
| 2 | 5 | 47 | Fonty Flock | Grady Cole / Bruce Griffin | Hudson | | Running |
| 3 | 3 | 22 | Red Byron | Raymond Parks | Oldsmobile | | Running |
| 4 | 14 | 2 | Sam Rice | Sam Rice | Oldsmobile | | Running |
| 5 | 2 | 90 | Tim Flock | Buddy Elliott | Oldsmobile | | Running |
| 6 | | 37 | Archie Smith | Frank Smith | Ford | | |
| 7 | | 31 | Sterling Long | Sterling Long | Hudson | | |
| 8 | | 28 | Slick Smith | Slick Smith | Oldsmobile | | |
| 9 | 6 | 41 | Curtis Turner | Curtis Turner | Buick | | |
| 10 | | 36 | Jimmy Thompson | Bruce Thompson | Chrysler | | |
| 11 | | 87 | Buck Baker | Penny Mullis | Kaiser | | |
| 12 | 8 | 44 | Bill Blair | R. B. McIntosh | Lincoln | 150 | Overheating |
| 13 | | 52 | Jack Smith | Bishop Brothers | Ford | | Overheating |
| 14 | 13 | 71 | Sara Christian | Frank Christian | Ford | | Overheating |
| 15 | | | John Barker | Unknown | Kaiser | | |
| 16 | | 0 | Jimmie Lewallen | Jimmie Lewallen | Ford | | |
| 17 | 9 | 38 | Lee Petty | Glimer Goode | Buick | 105 | Crash |
| 18 | | 11 | Skimp Hersey | Skimp Hersey | Ford | | |
| 19 | | 25 | Bob Smith | Unknown | Oldsmobile | | |
| 20 | 4 | 19 | Otis Martin | Pee Wee Martin | Ford | | Overheating |
| 21 | | 37 | Frank Smith | Frank Smith | Chrysler | | |
| 22 | | 16 | Bill Snowden | Bill Snowden | Mercury | | Overheating |
| 23 | | 60 | Jim Paschal | Jim Paschal | Ford | | Overheating |
| 24 | | 1 | B. E. Renfro | B. E. Renfro | Hudson | | |
| 25 | | 10 | Fred Johnson | Fred Johnson | Ford | | |
| 26 | | 88 | George Mantooth | George Mantooth | Ford | | |
| 27 | | 5 | Felix Wilkes | Felix Wilkes | Lincoln | | Overheating |
| 28 | 10 | 9 | Pee Wee Martin | Pee Wee Martin | Oldsmobile | | |
| 29 | | 93 | Herb Thomas | Herb Thomas | Ford | | Springs |
| 30 | | 4 | Frank Mundy | Sam Rice | Cadillac | | Rear-front spindle |
| 31 | | 29 | Clarence Benton | Clarence Benton | Ford | | |
| 32 | 1 | 7 | Bob Flock | Davis Brothers | Hudson | 38 | Engine |
| DSQ | 7 | 25 | Glenn Dunaway | Hubert Westmoreland | Ford | 200 | Disqualified |
