= Charlotte Speedway =

Race track in Charlotte, North Carolina

Coordinates: 35.238517°N 80.943757°W

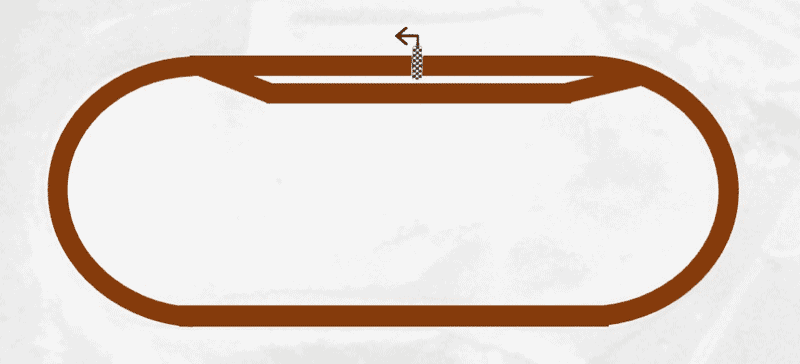
- Location: Charlotte, North Carolina
- Capacity: 13,000
- Owner: Carl C. Allison Sr. (1949–1956)
- Opened: 1949
- Closed: 17 October 1956; 69 years ago
- Major events: Former: NASCAR Grand National Series (1949–1956)

Oval
- Length: 0.748 mi (1.203 km)

Charlotte Speedway was an oval racetrack in Charlotte, North Carolina, United States. It was the site of NASCAR's first Strictly Stock Series (now NASCAR Cup Series) race on June 19, 1949. The Daytona Beach Road Course held the first race sanctioned by NASCAR in 1948.

The track was a few miles west of the NASCAR Hall of Fame, on Little Rock Road. It was owned by Carl C. Allison Sr. and his wife, Catherine Montgomery Allison. The track was forced to close when construction of Interstate 85 took its parking area.

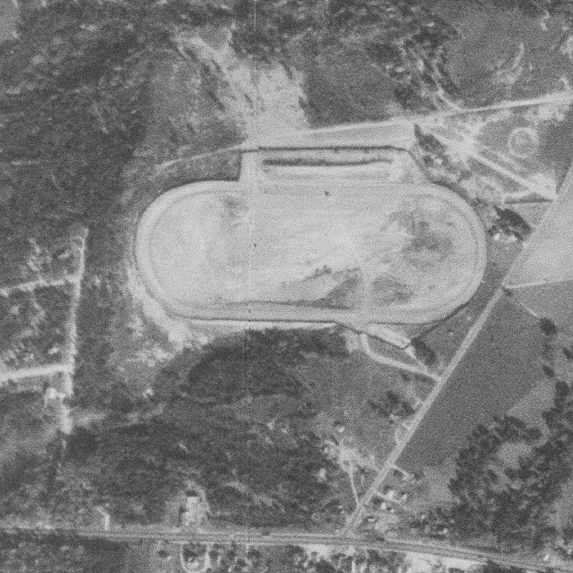
Aerial view of Charlotte Speedway

== Event details ==
Charlotte Speedway was a three-quarter mile long dirt track. The first event in 1949 was a 150-mile (240 km) race. Other events were 100, 113, or 150 miles (240 km) long.

== NASCAR history ==
Twelve events were held at the track between 1949 and 1956. Winners at the track include: Jim Roper (1), Tim Flock (1), Curtis Turner (2), Herb Thomas (2), Dick Passwater (1), Buck Baker (3), Fonty Flock (1), and Speedy Thompson (1).

=== 1949 ===
Bob Flock won the pole. Glenn Dunaway was declared the original winner, but a post-race inspection revealed that his car was fitted with illegal springs, causing NASCAR to disqualify him. Jim Roper was declared the official winner of the event. Roper would only compete in one more NASCAR event in his career. Other famous drivers to finish in the Top 10 include: Fonty Flock, Red Byron, Tim Flock, and Curtis Turner. Famous drivers to finish outside of the Top 10 include: Buck Baker, Jack Smith, Lee Petty, Herb Thomas, and Bob Flock. Sara Christian finished 14th to become the first female to start in a NASCAR race.
