= Erie County Fairgrounds =

Fairground in New York, U.S.

- Interactive map of Erie County Fairgrounds
- Location: Hamburg, New York
- Coordinates: 42.7366°N 78.8203°W
- Area: 275 acres (111 hectares)
- Operator: Erie County Agricultural Society
- Status: Open
- Website: www.the-fairgrounds.com

The Erie County Fairgrounds is a multi-purpose venue based in the town of Hamburg, New York, United States. It has hosted the annual Erie County Fair since 1868.

== Facilities ==
=== Buildings and grounds ===
- 275 acres
- 112 permanent buildings and structures, the oldest of which is the Octagon Building (1885)
- showplex
- 4 green parks (Baker, Slade, Fries, Hickory Tree)

=== Buffalo Raceway ===
The Buffalo Raceway is a renowned horse race venue known primarily for harness racing. James J. Dunnigan, a resident of Hamburg in New York was responsible for the opening of the raceway as far back as June 1942. This entrepreneur chose Hamburg’s Erie County Fairgrounds to be the location of his project, which he undertook after the State of New York approved a bill permitting harness racing under the pari-mutuel betting system.

=== Hamburg Gaming ===
Hamburg Gaming at the Erie County Fairgrounds in Hamburg, N.Y features 940 gaming machines on the main gaming floor and an outdoor gaming patio.

== Events ==
=== Erie County Fair ===
The annual fair brings rides, food, live music and myriad attractions to the region for twelve days. Free Grandstand shows and roaming acts feature live music and entertainment, and other attractions include, Touch-a-Truck displays, equine vet exhibits and rider simulations, CPR training, and 2,500+ animals on display across 16 barns.

=== Festival of lights ===
Each December, the Festival experience includes drive-through light displays, a visit with Santa, live reindeer, the all new Santa's Christmas Express Train Ride, an illuminated pixel show choreographed to music and an outdoor European market.

=== Stock car racing ===
Operating as the Hamburg Speedway, the one-half mile oval on the premises hosted auto racing from 1946 until 1997, including sprint cars and dirt modifieds.

In 1949, the facility presented one of just eight inaugural stock car races for what was to become the NASCAR Cup Series. Jack White of nearby Lockport, New York, was the victor. The only return of the series to Hamburg was in 1950, and was won by racing pioneer Dick Linder.
