= Heidelberg Raceway =

Former motor sports racing venue

Coordinates: 40.3870°N 80.0943°W

Heidelberg Raceway was an American auto racing track which was built near Heidelberg, Pennsylvania in Scott Township, Allegheny County, approximately 6 miles (9.7 km) southwest of Pittsburgh, Pennsylvania. It held weekly races and numerous special events between 1948 and 1973. It held four NASCAR Strictly Stock/Grand National Series and one NASCAR Convertible Division race between the 1940s and 1960s. In 1960, Heidelberg became the first track to fall off NASCAR's tour. The land is now occupied by a shopping center called Raceway Plaza.

== History ==
The track was the brainchild of the original Wrights Sea Food Inn owner, Ike Wright. It was originally constructed between 1947 and 1948 to be used as a horse racing establishment, with help and financial backing by Pittsburgh Steelers founder Art Rooney. When horse racing was not legalized in Pennsylvania., the track was converted into a place for autos to compete. The original track was a 1/2-mile dirt track that eventually had a 1/4-mile track cut into its infield. The tracks shared part of a straightaway that existed in front of the main grandstands. Over the final years of the tracks existence, there was also a figure-8 course being used within the quarter-mile section of the track.

The first races happened at the track in May 1948. The first event was almost rained out, but track officials had drivers pilot their race cars around the course, using the heat buildup from the vehicle's tires to dry the track surface. Once the races began, the air became dusty from the cars racing around the track. The Observer-Reporter interviewed fans after the track closed, and they reported that the air was so dusty that fans could rarely see the race cars come down the straightaways. Thursday nights were selected because the Pittsburgh Pirates Major League Baseball team had only three Thursday night baseball games that season. Midget cars were the first weekly series, featuring drivers Jimmy Bryan, Bill Schindler, Al Shaffer, and Billy Spear. They raced on the 1/4 mile inner track. Special events featured sprint cars on the 1/2-mile track. From 1950 until 1953, the track began hosting coupe racing under NASCAR sanction. In 1954, Ed Witzberger took over promotion of the track, and eventually formed the Pittsburgh Racing Association (PRA) which raced coupes up to five nights per week including Thursday nights at Heidelberg. Other tracks in the association included South Park Speedway, Monduke Speedway, and Clinton Speedway. Chris Economaki, was the track announcer for special events in the 1950s. The track featured coupes until 1961, then late models became the track's main class.

Witzberger had both tracks paved before the 1967 season. At the end of the 1972 season, when track promoter Ed Witzberger and driver Tom Colella could not come to terms on a three-year lease, an agreement was reached where Colella would lease the track, for one year, in 1973. The track was permanently closed at the end of the 1973 season. In an interview in 2007, Colella cited the 1973 oil crisis and urban sprawl as factors in the decision. Ed Howe won the last race on the track, a 250-lap special event, in 1973. Herb Scott had won more championships at Heidelberg than any other driver with a total of ten season championships. In April 1975, the owners sold closed racetrack to Center Associates of Youngstown, Ohio for $1.15 million, which would help facilitate the construction of a Hills department store, requiring 17 acres (6.9 ha) of the speedway land. The Hills would be a part of a new shopping center on Route 50 that would cost $3 million and contain 12 stores.

Nick Garin decided to build a Pennsylvania Motor Speedway in Imperial, Pennsylvania and he purchased many of the components from Heidelberg. He used the bleachers and fence from around the track at the new speedway. The site formally known as Heidelberg Raceway is now "Raceway Plaza"; a shopping strip mall that includes Walmart, Lowe's Home Improvement, Shop 'n Save, and Woltz & Wind Ford.

There wasn't a facility in Western Pennsylvania and very few in the country that matched its amenities. The seating was state-of-the-art stuff. Witzberger had an electric scoreboard before anybody else had it. He had a press box with theater seating in it and it was air-conditioned. That track then is probably better than 90 percent of the tracks that exist today. And that was back in the '60s and '70s. He was always very progressive at the short-track level.

— Larry Mattingly, Jennerstown Speedway GM and former track publicist

=== Other notable weekly drivers ===
- Dick Linder, NASCAR and USAC driver
- Joe Mihalic
- Norm Benning, Jr., ARCA driver
- Bud Middaugh
- Tom Colella
- Bob James (former mechanic for Richard Petty)
- Jody Ridley

== Special races ==
=== Tri-State 150 ===
The PRA began hosting the Tri-State 150 as a special event on the 1/2-mile track after the regular season was completed. Winners included Herb Scott (1958), Gus Linder (1959), Joe Mihalic (1963) and Norm Benning, Sr. (1964). Benning said that the race winner won around $3000. "Today that would be nothing," Benning said. "It was big back then. I remember one time we had 186 cars for a weekend race. Heidelberg brought in cars from Ohio, Michigan, Indiana weekly. It was the best track and it paid the most money."

=== Gulf 250 ===
The track later started hosting a second major special event in late October called the Pittsburger 200. When the track was paved, it became the Pittsburger 250. The 250 began attracting pavement drivers from around the United States, including NASCAR driver Bobby Allison.

=== Gulf 100 ===
On August 2, 1973 Heidelberg hosted a NASCAR sanctioned event for the Grand National East Series. The 100 lap event attracted several NASCAR regulars; including Tiny Lund, Bobby Allison, Cale Yarborough and Buddy Baker. Local driver Tom Colella qualified fastest at slightly over 88 mph to start on the pole. Colella led from start to finish to win $845 and the event by 2 laps over second place Tiny Lund who took home $685. Bobby Watson, Jeff Faber, and Bruce Gould rounded out the top 5.

=== NASCAR races ===
Heidelberg held the seventh event in the first season of NASCAR's Strictly Stock Series on October 2. Lee Petty, father of NASCAR's winningest driver Richard Petty, won his first NASCAR race at the track. Petty had rolled his big boxy Buick Roadmaster earlier in the year at the Charlotte race, and brought a lighter weight number 42 Plymouth to the Heidelberg track. Petty beat local driver Dick Linder by five laps, the largest margin of victory throughout the 1949 season. Bill Rexford finished third, followed by Sam Rice and Sara Christian to round out the top five. Christian's fifth place finish in that race was the highest finish by a woman driver in the top level of the NASCAR racing until March 5, 2011, when Danica Patrick finished 4th in the NASCAR Nationwide Series race at Las Vegas Motor Speedway.

At the track's final race for NASCAR's premier Grand National series in 1960, Lee Petty won with his son Richard Petty finishing second. There would be no father-son 1-2 finish until Bobby Allison beat Davey Allison at the 1988 Daytona 500.

==== Strictly Stock/Grand National ====
| Date | Surface | Winner |
|---|---|---|
| October 2, 1949 | 1/2 mile dirt | Lee Petty |
| July 15, 1951 | 1/2 mile dirt | Herb Thomas |
| July 21, 1959 | 1/4 mile dirt | Jim Reed |
| July 10, 1960 | 1/2 mile dirt | Lee Petty |

==== NASCAR Convertible Division ====
| Date | Surface | Winner |
|---|---|---|
| August 19, 1956 | 1/2 mile dirt | Joe Weatherly |

==== NASCAR Grand National East Series ====
| Date | Surface | Winner |
|---|---|---|
| August 2, 1973 | 1/2 mile dirt | Tom Colella |

== Raceway Champions ==
- 1954 - Buddy O'Connor
- 1955 - Dick Linder
- 1956 - Herb Scott
- 1957 - Herb Scott
- 1958 - Herb Scott
- 1959 - Herb Scott
- 1960 - Herb Scott
- 1961 - Don Luffy
- 1962 - Herb Scott
- 1963 - Herb Scott
- 1964 - Herb Scott
- 1965 - Herb Scott
- 1966 - Buddy O'Connor
- 1967 - Herb Scott
- 1968 - Harold Smith
- 1969 - Harold Smith
- 1970 - Jim Bickerstaff
- 1971 - Tom Colella
- 1972 - Ken Hemphill

== See also ==
- Bedford Speedway
- Eriez Speedway
- Lake Erie Speedway, Erie County, south of North East, Pennsylvania
- Nazareth Speedway
- Pocono Raceway

== Bibliography ==
- Fielden, Greg (1993). "All". Forty Years of Stock Car Racing The Beginning 1949-1958 (Revised 3rd ed.). USA: Garfield Press. p. 336. ISBN 0-9621580-2-X.
