= International Racing Association =

The International Racing Association (IRA) was a stock car racing series based in the United States. Founded in 1981 by recently retired USAC Stock Car driver Sal Tovella, the series was started as an attempt at a breakaway series amid a schism in USAC Stock Car. The association ran seasons annually from 1982 to 1985.

== Overview ==
The IRA served as a sanctioning body for races featuring USAC/ARCA-style stock cars, and used the marketing motto "The Return of Real Racing". The league operated full racing season calendars between 1982 and 1985.

The league was founded in October 1981 by Sal Tovella, who had recently retired from a lengthy stock car racing career spent primarily in USAC Stock Cars.

To establish the IRA, Tovella partnered with a group of owners and stock car drivers that had grown frustrated with the USAC. This was similar to the schism which years earlier had seen open wheel racing teams break away from USAC Championship Car to form Championship Auto Racing Teams (CART).

One of Tovella's greatest frustrations with USAC was the league's loss of stature (having been largely eclipsed by NASCAR), and its move away from the use of "true" (late-model racing) stock cars. The IRA permitted a much wider variety of late models to be used as vehicles in its races than USAC had been permitting, and also restricted racing to cars which had a conventional stock car build (preventing so-called "Saturday Night Specials" from being raced).

Tovella had initially hoped his new league would ultimately supplant NASCAR as the most prominent stock car league in the United States.

The initial executive leadership of the league featured Tovella as president, John Hage as executive vice president, Ed Hoffman as secretary/treasurer, Al Swenson as director of competition, Fred Mosco as director of technical operations, and Harry Molenaar as director of marketing.

== 1982 season ==
Tracks raced at included the Wisconsin International Raceway (Kaukauna, Wisconsin), Illiana Motor Speedway (Schererville, Indiana), and Rockford Speedway (Loves Park, Illinois).

In its inaugural season the league partnered with ARTGO for a double-header race weekend at the Wisconsin International Raceway (the Wisconsin 400).

Drivers during the 1982 season included Don White (the all-time winningest USAC Stock Car driver), Roger Regeth, J.J. Smith, Bob Dotter, Bill Venturini, Bob Schacht, and Marv Smith.

1982 races
No.	Date/(race name)	Track	Winning driver
1	5/16/1982	Illiana Motor Speedway (Schererville, Indiana)	Bob Schacht
2	5/16/1982	Illiana Motor Speedway (Schererville, Indiana)	Bob Schacht
3	6/26/1982	Wisconsin International Raceway (Kaukauna, Wisconsin)	Bill Venturini
4	6/26/1982	Wisconsin International Raceway (Kaukauna, Wisconsin)	Bob Dotter
5	7/3/1982	Illiana Motor Speedway (Schererville, Indiana)	Bill Venturini
6	7/3/1982	Illiana Motor Speedway (Schererville, Indiana)	Marv Smith
7	9/12/1982	Illiana Motor Speedway (Schererville, Indiana)	Bill Venturini
8	10/17/1982	Rockford Speedway (Loves Park, Illinois)	Bill Venturini

Season champion: Bill Venturini

== 1983 season ==
1983 races
No.	Date/(race name)	Track	Winning driver
1	6/12/1983	Illiana Motor Speedway (Schererville, Indiana)	Bob Schacht
2	7/2/1983	Illiana Motor Speedway (Schererville, Indiana)	Bob Schacht
3	8/7/1983	Rockford Speedway (Loves Park, Illinois)	Bob Schacht
4	9/11/1983	Illiana Motor Speedway (Schererville, Indiana)	Bob Dotter

Season champion: Bob Schacht

== 1984 season ==
1984 races
No.	Date/(race name)	Track	Winning driver
1	6/23/1984	Illiana Motor Speedway (Schererville, Indiana)	Bob Schacht
2	7/4/1984	Illiana Motor Speedway (Schererville, Indiana)	Bob Schacht
3	7/15/1984	Lake Geneva Raceway (Lake Geneva, Wisconsin)	Bob Schacht
4	8/4/1984	Illiana Motor Speedway (Schererville, Indiana)	Bob Schacht
5	9/16/1984	Milwaukee Mile (West Allis, Wisconsin)	Bob Schacht
6	9/29/1984	Illiana Motor Speedway (Schererville, Indiana)	Bob Dotter

Season champion: Bob Schacht

== 1985 season ==
1985 races
No.	Date/(race name)	Track	Winning driver
1	6/8/1985	Illiana Motor Speedway (Schererville, Indiana)	Robert Hixon
2	7/6/1985	Milwaukee Mile (West Allis, Wisconsin)	Bob Schacht
3	7/27/1985	Illiana Motor Speedway (Schererville, Indiana)	Bob Schacht
4	9/7/1985	Illiana Motor Speedway (Schererville, Indiana)	Frank Gawlinski

Season champion: Terry Pearson
