= 1956 NASCAR Grand National Series race at Soldier Field =

1956
Race details
- Race 33 of 56 in the 1956 NASCAR Grand National Series season
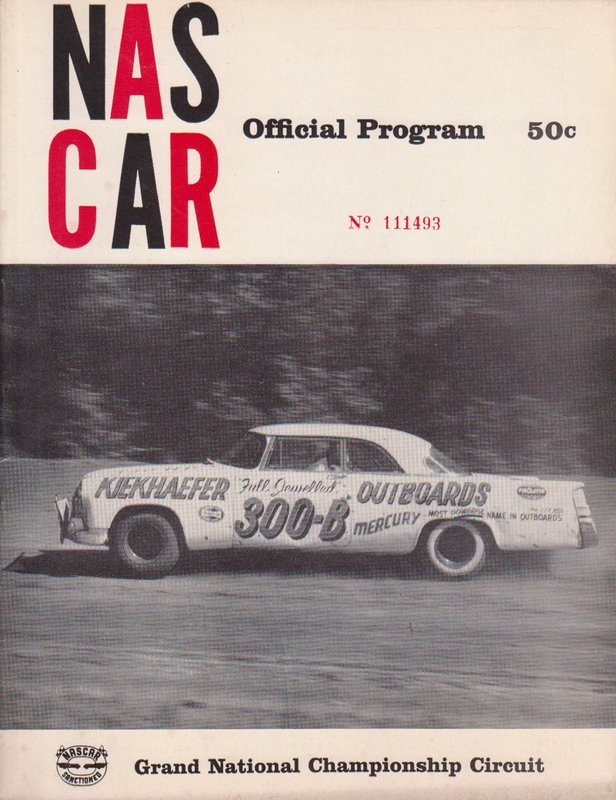
- Cover of the program for the race
- Date: July 21, 1956
- Location: Soldier Field, Chicago
- Course: Permanent racing facility
- Course length: 0.5 miles (80 km)
- Distance: 200 laps, 100 mi (160.9 km)
- Average speed: 61.037 miles per hour (98.230 km/h)
- Attendance: 14,402

Pole position
Driver	Billy Myers	Bill Stroppe

Most laps led

Winner
No. 22	Fireball Roberts	DePaolo

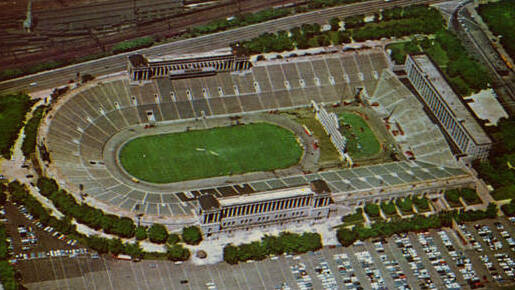
Photograph of Soldier Field, circa 1961

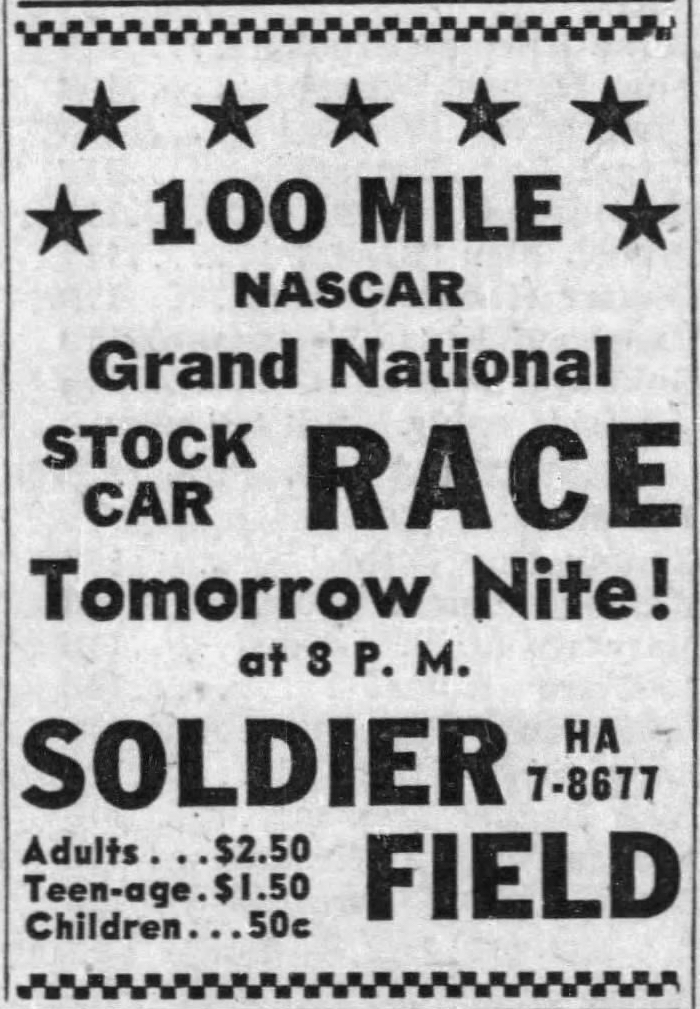
Advertisement for the race, published in the Chicago Tribune on July 20, 1956

On July 21, 1956, the NASCAR Grand National Series (today known as the NASCAR Cup Series) held the 33rd race of its season at Soldier Field in Chicago. The race was won by Fireball Roberts, and is today considered the only NASCAR Cup Series race to have been held at the venue.^{(note a)}

== Background ==
The NASCAR Grand National Series (today known as the NASCAR Cup Series) had first visited the Chicagoland area in 1954, when a reported crowd of 6,000 watched a race at the suburban Santa Fe Speedway. For the 1956 season, NASCAR held races at Soldier Field in Chicago, including this Grand National Series race and two Convertible Division races. Soldier Field had been regularly used as an auto racing venue since the 1940s.

This was the first NASCAR Grand National Series/NASCAR Cup Series race to be held in the city of Chicago. It is today regarded to have been the only NASCAR Cup Series race held at the Soldier Field. ^{(note a)}

To accommodate NASCAR races in 1956, a new half-mile track layout was added to the stadium by adding new paved track to the north end of the stadium. The race was promoted by Andy Granatelli, at the time the key promoter of races at Soldier Field. Granatelli worked with NASCAR head Bill France Sr. to schedule the race.

It had been thirteen days between the Soldier Field race and the previous NASCAR Grand National Series race at California State Fairgrounds. A race that had been scheduled to be held at Old Bridge Stadium in Old Bridge, New Jersey during the weekend in-between these two races was called-off due to rain.

== Race summary ==
Held July 21, 1956, the race used the stadium's half-mile short track configuration. At 200 laps, the race's length was 100 miles. Attendance at the race was 14,402. The race was contested by twenty-five drivers. While not an extraordinarily large number of drivers, some of the season's largest stars were among the competitors. Five competitors were future NASCAR Hall of Famers. The pole winner was Billy Myers.

The race was won by Fireball Roberts, who beat Jim Paschal by one car-length. Pascal had been the lap leader until the 194th lap, when Roberts surpassed him. Roberts was driving a Ford for Pete DePaolo's team. Third-place finisher Ralph Moody was also driving for DePaolo. The fourth, fifth, and sixth-place finishers (respectively: Speedy Thompson, Frank Mundy, and Buck Baker) all were racing for Carl Kiekhaefer's team, which had dominated the 1956 Grand National Series season. Ten cars failed to finish the race. Five of these were sidelined due to brake issues, a regular problem on short tracks.

== Race stats ==
Stats
Winning driver:	Fireball Roberts
Winning team:	DePaolo
Winning car make:	1956 Ford
Track description:	0.5-mile (0.80 km) paved short track oval
Laps:	200
Length:	100 miles (160 km)
Competitors:	25 drivers
Attendance:	14,402
Duration:	1:38:18
Avg. speed:	61.037 mph (98.230 km/h)
Margin-of-victory:	1 car-length

== Results ==
Legend:

- Finish: Finishing place of driver
- Start Pos.: Starting position of driver
- Car #: Car number
- Driver: Driver's name
- Sponsor: Sponsor of driver
- Owner/Team: Owner/team for which driver drove
- Car make: Make of car driven
- Laps: Laps completed
- Money: Earnings for race
- Status: If car was running at end of race, or otherwise the reason it was out of the race

Summary by driver
Finish	Start Pos.	Car #	Driver	Sponsor	Owner/ Team	Car make	Laps	Money	Status
1	3	22	Fireball Roberts	DePaolo Engineering	Pete DePaolo	1956 Ford	200	$850	running
2	14	75	Jim Paschal	C U Later Alligator	Frank Hayworth	1956 Mercury	200	$625	running
3	4	12	Ralph Moody	DePaolo Engineering	Pete DePaolo	1956 Ford	200	$450	running
4	12	500	Speedy Thompson		Carl Kiekhaefer	1956 Dodge	200	$350	running
5	8	500B	Frank Mundy		Carl Kiekhaefer	1956 Dodge	200	$310	running
6	9	502	Buck Baker		Carl Kiekhaefer	1956 Dodge	199	$250	running
7	13	31	Bill Champion		John Whitford	1956 Ford	199	$200	running
8	6	32	Paul Goldsmith		Smokey Yunick	1956 Chevrolet	198	$150	running
9	7	719	Joy Fair		Russell Wainscott	1956 Dodge	192	$100	running
10	10	42	Lee Petty		Petty Enterprises	1956 Dodge	190	$100	running
11	20	7	Bob Esposito		–	1955 Oldsmobile	189	$100	running
12	23	33	Frank Edwards		–	1956 Chevrolet	182	$100	running
13	22	48	Bill Massey		Don Holcomb	1956 Ford	176	$100	running
14	21	38	Chuck Mesler		–	1956 Dodge	175	$100	running
15	15	66	Al Watkins		Al Watkins	1956 Ford	164	$100	running
16	24	2	Sal Tovella		–	1956 Ford	142	$100	brakes
17	1	14	Billy Myers		Bill Stroppe	1956 Mercury	140	$100	brakes
18	2	92	Herb Thomas		Herb Thomas	1956 Chevrolet	98	$100	crash
19	17	204	Darvin Randahl		Darvin Randahl	1956 Ford	86	$50	brakes
20	11	150	Fred Lorenzen		Fred Lorenzen	1956 Chevrolet	85	$50	brakes
21	16	40	Bob Chauncey		–	1956 Pontiac	78	$50	spindle
22	5	3	Tom Pistone		–	1956 Chevrolet	50	$50	brakes
23	19	44	Bill Vesler		–	1955 Chevrolet	41	$50	crash
24	18	165	Kenny Paulsen		–	1955 Chevrolet	40	$50	engine
25	25	37	Ray Crowley		Ronnie Duman	1956 Plymouth	36	$100	carburetor

== Subsequent history of NASCAR in the Chicago area ==
The 1957 edition of Soldier Field's annual Chicago Park District Police Benevolent Association Gold Trophy Race (held on June 15, 1957) was sanctioned by NASCAR as a 50-lap short track race under the "NASCAR Grand National" banner. Despite the 1957 race being considered at the time it was held to have been a NASCAR Grand National Series event, it is not retrospectively considered to have been an official part of the 1957 NASCAR Grand National Series. For reasons that are unclear, Soldier Field never held another NASCAR Cup Series race. NASCAR ceased holding any races at Soldier Field after 1957.

NASCAR Winston Racing Series races were held in the Chicagoland area at the Santa Fe Speedway, which was ultimately demolished in 1995. NASCAR returned to the Chicagoland area for the 2000 NASCAR Craftsman Truck Series, with the Sears Craftsman 175 being held at the Chicago Motor Speedway in Cicero, Illinois. The NASCAR Cup Series would not return to the Chicagoland area until 2002, when the 2002 Tropicana 400 was held at the Chicagoland Speedway in Joliet, Illinois. NASCAR would not return to the city proper again until 2023, when the Xfinity Series held The Loop 110 and the NASCAR Cup Series held the Grant Park 220 at the Chicago Street Course.

== See also ==
- Motorsport at Soldier Field

== Notes ==
^note a The 1957 edition of Soldier Field's annual Chicago Park District Police Benevolent Association Gold Trophy Race (held on June 15, 1957) was sanctioned by NASCAR as a 50-lap short track race under the "NASCAR Grand National" banner. It was won by Bill Brown. However, while this 1957 race was considered to be a NASCAR Grand National Series event at the time it was held, by the 2010s it did not appear on NASCAR's retrospective lists of Grand National events that were held in the 1957 NASCAR Grand National Series.

Preceded by untitled race at California State Fairgrounds	NASCAR Grand National Series season 1956	Succeeded by untitled race at Cleveland County Fairgrounds
