= Sal Tovella =

American racecar driver (1928–2019)

Sal Tovella (August 13, 1928 – March 10, 2019) was an American racecar driver who competed in USAC Stock Car. He also competed in the NASCAR Cup Series, NASCAR Convertible Series, and the ARCA Menards Series. His racing career spanned from the 1950s into the 1980s. After his own racing career, he founded the short-lived International Racing Association stock car series.

== Early life ==
Tovella was born August 13, 1928. Tovella grew up on the North Side of Chicago.

== Racing career ==
Tovella began his racing career at Chicago's Soldier Field racetrack in the early 1950, initially competing there in the Hurricane Hot Rod Association. The association, run by promoter Andy Granatelli, featured occasionally-staged action in order to provide an entertaining product for spectators. He won his first feature at the Soldier Field track in a June 21, 1952, 22-lap race in which he steered his 1949 model Ford car to victory before a reported 18,846 spectators. Tovella was long a fixture on the Soldier Field track. He won the track's own stock car title during its 1952 season. During the track's 1963 season, Tovella again took the track's title after coming out on top of a intensely-contested season-long rivalry with Bob Chapman. He clenched the track's 1963 late model stock car championship title thanks his "double-points" 100-lap victory in a race on June 29, 1963. He drove a '63 Chevy II during the track's 1963 season. Tovella competed in Soldier Field stock car races by a variety of organizing leagues, including a 1967 race organized by the International Motor Contest Association.

The cars Tovella raced varied over his career, with Tovella, at different times, driving cars manufactured by several brands (including Ford, Chevrolet, Edsel, Plymouth, Dodge, and Oldsmobile).

Tovella was long a top racer in USAC Stock Car racing. Despite having had his first start for a USAC race in 1957, during the 1963 season, he was named the USAC "Rookie of the Year". Tovella secured his first victory in the USAC in a July 30, 1966 race at the Mosport International Raceway; a race in which his '65 Plymouth won a 50-lap race on the 2.5 miles (4.0 km)-long road course, and prevailed over Billy Foster and Roger Regeth. Tovella won several USAC races at the Milwaukee Mile. His first victory at the track occurred on August 10, 1975, with a memorable finish over Ramo Stott, Roger McCluskey, Butch Hartman, and Larry Moore. In the race, Tovella steered a '72 Plymouth which had been prepared for the race by his brother, Fred. This 1975 victory was his second USAC Stock Car victory. Tovella's final of six USAC victories came in 1980 at the DuQuoin State Fairgrounds Racetrack.

Tovella also competed in several NASCAR races, including NASCAR Grand National Series races. He competed in fourteen NASCAR events. This included a 1956 NASCAR Grand National Series race at Soldier Field, which he had to withdraw from due to break problems (coming in 16th place). Tovella raced in the Daytona 500 for five consecutive seasons, competing in the 1960, 1961, 1962, 1963, and 1964 iterations). He placed 14th in the 1961 iteration, marking most successful Daytona 500 appearance.

On June 9, 1968, Tovella won what ultimately prove to be the final stock car race held at Soldier Field.

In 2012, Tovella was inducted in the Illinois Stock Car Hall of Fame.

== International Racing Association ==
After retiring from racing himself, Tovella founded the International Racing Association in October 1981. The league served as a sanctioning body for races featuring USAC/ARCA-style stock cars, and used the marketing motto "The Return of Real Racing". The league operated full racing season calendars between 1982 and 1985.

== Personal life ==
Tovella long lived in Chicago, later living in Addison, Illinois. For most of his life, he operated a used car sales business, Sal's Auto Sales. The business was long located in Chicago on Milwaukee Avenue, but later relocated to Elmhurst, Illinois.

Tovella died on March 10, 2019, at the age of 90. His funeral was held at Russo's Hillside Chapels. He was entombed at Queen of Heaven Cemetery in Hillsdale, Illinois.

== USAC Stock Car career statistics ==
=== USAC Stock Car season statistics ===
USAC Stock Car season results
Year	Rank	Team	Car	Starts	Wins	Poles	Podium finishes	Top 5 finishes	Top 10 finishes	Laps led	Average start	Average finish	DNFs	Points
1956			'56 Plymouth	1	0	0	0							
1957			'57 Chevrolet	2 of 16	0	0	0							
1958			'57 Chevrolet	2 of 12	0	0	0							
1959			'58 Ford Edsel Convertible	4 of 17	0	0	0							
1960			'60 Ford	6 of 9	0	0	0							
1961	58th		'59 Ford	12 of 22	0	0	0							
1962	105th		'62 Ford	9 of 22	0	0	0							
1963	44th		'63 Ford	11 of 16	0	0	0							
1964			'63 Ford	11 of 15	0	0	0							
1965		Tovella Racing	'64 Ford	12 of 16	0	1	0							
1966			'65 Plymouth	13 of 17	1	3	0							
1967			'67 Dodge	14 of 22	0	3	0							
1968			'68 Dodge Charger	7 of 20	0	1	0							
1969		Fred Tovella	'69 Ford	5 of 25	0	0	0							
1970			'70 Plymouth Superbird	11 of 20	0	1	0							
1971		Fred Tovella	'70 Plymouth	15 of 19	0	0	0							
1972		Fred Tovella	'72 Plymouth	17 of 19	0	1	0							
1973		Fred Tovella	Dodge	12 of 16	0	0	0							
1974		Donald Hobbs	'72 Chevrolet	6 of 19	0	0	0							
1975	3rd	Fred Tovella	'72 Plymouth	8 of 15	2	5	3							
1976	3rd	Fred Tovella	'76 Plymouth	12 of 12	0	3	0							
1977	3rd	Fred Tovella	'74 Plymouth and '77 Plymouth Volare	10 of 10	1	4	0							
1978		Fred Tovella	Dodge and '77 Plymouth Volare	10 of 13	1	3	0							
1979	7th	Fred Tovella	'79 Dodge Diplomat	12 of 12	0	1	0	4	7	1	12.25	14.83	5	1,050
1980	5th	Fred Tovella	Plymouth Volare	10 of 11	1	4	0	5	7	91	11.00	7.10	1	1,445
1981	2nd	Fred Tovella	Plymouth Volare	10 of 10	0	3	0	5	8	7	11.10	6.40	1	1,365

=== USAC Stock Car race statistics ===
USAC Stock Car race results
Year	Team	No.	Make	1	2	3	4	5	6	7	8	9	10	11	12	13	14	15	16	17	18	19	20	21	22	23	24	25	Pts	Ref
1956
1957														MKE; 37			MKE; 21				—N/a									
1958	information missing			–	–	–				–	–	–	MKE; DNQ	–	–	—N/a														
1959	1959	59	Chevy		SKY		SLM		MKE; 12	TRH	MKE; 7	WGR	DUQ; 22		MKE; 26						—N/a									
1959	information missing			LAN		WGR		NSH						LAN		ATL	ASP	LAX	LVG	HOU	—N/a									
1960	1960	'60 Ford	Chevy		MKE; 30	TRH; 7	MKE; 12	MKE; 20	DUQ; 7	MKE; 20			—N/a																	
1960	information missing			–							–	–	—N/a																	
1961			'59 Ford					DAY; 9																		—N/a				
1961		23	'61 Ford													MKE; 9			MKE; 27	MKE; 33			MKE; 8			—N/a				
1961			'61 Ford						DAY; 7	IMS; 7																—N/a				
1961	information missing				–	–		IRP; 11		–	CHI; 10	–	–	–	IRP; 18			IMS; 6			DUQ; 14	DUQ; 31		–	–	—N/a				
1962		83	1962 Ford											MKE; 19			MKE; 19	MKE; 8		DUQ; 5						—N/a				
1962			1962 Ford																			MKE; 7				—N/a				
1962			Ford																					IMS; 6		—N/a				
1962	information missing									CAN; 2						IMS; 17					IND; 8		IMS; 22		MSF; 5	—N/a				
1963		8	'63 Ford		IRP; 8					MKE; 6			MKE; 8							—N/a										
1963	Tom Hawkinson	8	'63 Ford															MKE; 4		—N/a										
1963			'63 Ford									MKE; 12					LAN; 13		IMS; 5	—N/a										
1963			Ford						IRP; 9											—N/a										
1963	information missing						IMS; 11	IMS; 11			MDW; 4			SPR; 9	DUQ; 23	IND; 8				—N/a										
1964
1965
1966		5	'65 Plymouth	LAN; 3					MKE				MKE	MKE				LNG; 5	MKE		—N/a									
1966			'65 Plymouth													IND				MID	—N/a									
1966			Plymouth								CAN; 4	CAN; 1									—N/a									
1966	missing information				IND										SPR		DUQ				—N/a									
1967		4	'67 Dodge	IRP; 27								MKE; 7							MKE; 39	MKE; 12					MKE; 14	—N/a				
1967			'67 Dodge Charger																					DUQ; 14		—N/a				
1967			'65 Dodge								CHI; 4		CHI; 4	CHI; 3												—N/a				
1967			Dodge												CAN; 9	CAN; 12										—N/a				
1967		54	'67 Ford																			IND; 10				—N/a				
1967	information missing				CHI; 2			CHI; 2	CHI; 16												SPR; 30					—N/a				
1968
1969
1970
1971
1972
1973
1974		54	'72 Chevrolet Chevelle		KNX; 20						MKE; 7												—N/a							
1974		23	Chevy													SPR; 10							—N/a							
1974	Cabrera Racing	20	'74 Dodge																IND; 11	DUQ; 21	MKE; 8		—N/a							
1975		8	Plymouth					MKE; 10			MKE; 1	MKE; 3	DUQ; 3	SPR; 3	IND; 6		MKE; 5	TTN; 1	—N/a											
1976		8	Plymouth Satellite	TWS; 6	I70; 10	MAR; 7	MKE; 2	MCH; 5	TWS; 5	MKE; 2	MKE; 5	SPR; 10	DUQ; 19	MKE; 5	TWS; 6	—N/a			—N/a											
1977		8	Plymouth Volare	ONT; 24	IND; 8	TWS; 4	MKE; 17	MCH; 8	MKE; 1	TWS; 2	SPR; 3	DUQ; 2	MKE; 24	—N/a					—N/a											
1978		8	Plymouth Volare					MKE; 2			MKE; 3	MKE; 5			MKE; 4	IMS; 7	—N/a													
1978		8	Dodge Aspen		ONT; 12												—N/a													
1978		8	Dodge Magnum										SPR; 1	DUQ; 5			—N/a													
1978		8	Dodge	TWS; 16					MCH; 35								—N/a													
1979		8	Plymouth Volare			IMS; 22	MKE; 22	MKE; 4	MKE; 23			MKE; 4	IMS; 3	OZK; 10		—N/a														
1979		8	Dodge Diplomat	TWS; 33	ONT; 9					IMS; 7	DUQ; 5					—N/a														
1979		8	Dodge Mirada												TWS; 35	—N/a														
1980		3	Plymouth Volare		TTN; 4			MKE; 2	MKE; 3	IMS; 14	DUQ; 1	IRP; 7	MKE; 3	IMS; 19	—N/a															
1980		3	Dodge Mirada			SPR; 7	IMS; 11								—N/a															
1981		6	Plymouth Volare	CAP; 9	TRI; 5	WIN; 3	SPR; 9	MKE; 11			MKE; 2		ELD; 15	—N/a																
1981		6	Dodge Mirada						SPR; 4	DUQ; 2		DSM; 7		—N/a																

Key
Color	Result
Gold	Winner
Silver	Finished 2nd–5th
Bronze	Finished 6th–10th
Green	Finished 11th–20th
Blue	Finished 21st or worse
Purple	Did not finish (DNF)
Black	Disqualified (DSQ)
Red	Did not qualify (DNQ)
Tan	Withdrew From Race (Wth)
White	Qualified for another driver (QL)
White	Qualified but replaced due to injury or incident (INQ)
White	Relieved another driver (RL)
Blank	Did not participate (DNP)
Blank	Excluded (EX)
Blank	Did not arrive (DNA)

== NASCAR Cup Series career statistics ==
=== NASCAR Cup Series season statistics ===
NASCAR Cup Series (Grand National) season results
Year	Rank	Team	Car	Races	Wins	Poles	Top 5 finishes	Top 10 finishes	Top 15 finishes	Top 20 finishes	Laps led	Points	Earnings	Average start	Average laps	Average finish	Races running at finish	Lead lap finishes	DNQs	Withdrawals
1956	221			1 of 56	0	0	0	0	0	1	0	0	$100	24.0	71	16.0	0	0		
1960	143			2 of 44	0	0	0	0	0	1	0	100	$275	26.5	18	41.5	1	0	1	
1961	59			4 of 52	0	0	0	0	1	1	0	1,624	$850	29.5	47	25.8	2	0		
1962	107			2 of 53	0	0	0	0	0	1	0	232	$450	29.5	32	29.0	1	0		
1963	44			3 of 55	0	0	0	0	1	2	0	2,570	$1,300	21.3	81	20.7	2	0		
1964	74			2 of 62	0	0	0	0	1	1	0	1,274	$850	19.0	70	17.5	1	0		
1981	—N/a	Rick Jaynes	Oldsmobile Cutlass	0 (Note: while Tovella did not qualify for any 1981 races, he did compete in the 1981 First UNO Twin 125 Qualifier (a qualifier for the 1981 Daytona 500)) of 31	0	0	0	0	0	0	0	0	$0 (Note: did earn $750 from 1981 First UNO Twin 125 Qualifier, but earned $0 in NASCAR Cup Series races due to failure to qualify for any)	—N/a	—N/a	—N/a	0	0	1	
Total	—N/a	—N/a	—N/a	14	0	0	0	0	3	7	0	5,800	3,825	25.4	22.5		7	0	2	0

=== NASCAR Cup Series race statistics ===
NASCAR Cup Series race results
Year	Team	No.	Make	1	2	3	4	5	6	7	8	9	10	11	12	13	14	15	16	17	18	19	20	21	22	23	24	25	26	27	28	29	30	31	32	33	34	35	36	37	38	39	40	41	42	43	44	45	46	47	48	49	50	51	52	53	54	55	56	57	58	59	60	61	62	NWCC	Pts	Ref
1956	n/a	2	Ford	HMS	CLT	WSS	PBS	ASF	DAB	PBS	WIL	ATL	NWS	LAN	RCH	CLB	CON	GPS	HCY	HBO	MAR	LIN	CLT	POR	EUR	NYF	MER	MAS	CLT	MCF	POR	AWS	RSP	PIF	CSF	CHI; 17	CCF	MGY	OKL	ROA	OBS	SAN	NOR	PIF	MYB	POR	DAR	CSH	CLT	LAN	POR	CLB	HBO	NWP	CLT	CCF	MAR	HCY	WIL	—N/a								
1960	Frank Filizer	52	Ford	CLT	CLB	DAY	DAY; 16	DAY; 67	CLT	NWS	PHO	CLB																																				—N/a																				
1960	Bob Rose	25	Ford										MAR; DNQ	HCY	WIL	BGS	GPS	AWS	DAR	PIF	HBO	RCH	HMS	CLT	BGS	DAY	HEI	MAB	MBS	ATL	BIR	NVS	AWS	PIF	CLB	SBO	BGS	DAR	HCY	CSF	GSP	HBO	MAR	NWS	CLT	RCH	ATL	—N/a																				
1961	Bob Rose	23	Ford	CLT	CLB	DAY	DAY	DAY; 25	PIF; 14	AWS	HMS	ATL	GPS	HBO	BGS	MAR	NWS	CLB	HCY	RCH	MAR	MAR	CLT	CLT	RSD	ASP	CLT	PIF	BIR	GPS	BGS	NOR	HAS	STR	DAY	ATL	CLB	MBS	BRI	NSV	BGS	AWS	RCH	SBO	DAR	HCY	RCH	CSF	ATL	MAR	NWS					—N/a												
1961	Jack Meeks	83	Ford																																																	CLT; 23	BRI	GPS	HBO	—N/a												
1962	Tom Hawkins	88	Ford	CON	AWS	DAY; 19	DAY	DAY; 88	CON	AWS	SVH	HBO	RCH	CLB	NWS	GPS	MBS	MAR	BGS	BRI	RCH	HCY	CON	DAR	PIF	CLT	ATL	BGS	AUG	RCH	SBO	DAY	CLB	ASH	GPS	AUG	SVH	MBS	BRI	CHT	NSV	HUN	AWS	STR	BGS	PIF	VAL	DAR	HCY	RCH	DTS	AUG	MAR	NWS	CLT	ATL	—N/a											
1963	Tom Hawkins	80	Ford	BIR	GGS	THS	RIV; 32	DAY; 13	DAY	DAY; 17	PIF	AWS	HBO	ATL	HCY	BRI	AUG	RCH	GPS	SBO	BGS	MAR	NWS	CLB	THS	DAR	ODS	RCH	CLT	BIR	ATL	DAY	MBS	SVH	DTS	BGS	ASH	OBS	BRR	BRI	GPS	NSV	CLB	AWS	PIF	BGS	ONA	DAR	HCY	RCH	MAR	DTS	NWS	THS	CLT	SBO	HBO	RSD	—N/a									
1964	Herb Onash	09	Ford	CON	AUG	JSP	SVH	RSD	DAY	DAY; 12	DAY; 23	RCH	BRI	GPS	BGS	ATL	AWS	HBO	PIF	CLB	NWS	MAR	SVH	DAR	LGY	HCY	SBO	CLT	GPS	ASH	ATL	CON	NSV	CHT	BIR	VAL	PIF	DAY	ODS	OBS	BRR	ISP	GLN	LIN	BRI	NSV	MBS	AWS	DTS	ONA	CLB	BGS	STR	DAR	HCY	RCH	ODS	HBO	MAR	SVH	NWS	CLT	HAR	AUG	JAC			
1981	Rick Jaynes		Oldsmobile	RSD	DAY; DNQ	RCH	CAR	ATL	BRI	NWS	DAR	MAR	TAL	NSV	DOV	CLT	TWS	RSD	MCH	DAY	NSV	POC	TAL	MCH	BRI	DAR	RCH	DOV	MAR	NWS	CLT	CAR	ATL	RSD	—N/a																															n/a	0	

== NASCAR Convertible Division career statistics ==
=== NASCAR Convertible Division season statistics ===
NASCAR Convertible Division season results
Year	Rank	Car	Starts	Wins	Poles	Top 5 finishes	Top 10 finishes	Top 15 finishes	Top 20 finishes	Laps raced	Laps led	Earnings	Average start	Average finish	Races running at finish	Miles raced	Lead lap finishes	Points
1956	—N/a	Plymouth	1	0	0	0	0	0	0	2	0	$100	21.0	21.0	0	1.00	0	0

=== NASCAR Convertible Division race statistics ===
NASCAR Convertible Division race results
Year	Team	No.	Make	1	2	3	4	5	6	7	8	9	10	11	12	13	14	15	16	17	18	19	20	21	22	23	24	25	26	27	28	29	30	31	32	33	34	35	36	37	38	39	40	41	42	43	44	45	46	47	Ref
1956	n/a	21	Plymouth																																									CHI; 21							

== ARCA Menards Series career statistics ==
=== ARCA Menards Series season statistics ===
ARCA Menards Series season results
Year	Rank	Races	Wins	Poles	Top 5 finishes	Top 10 finishes	Laps raced	Laps led	Average start	Average finish	Races running at finish	Miles raced	Lead lap finishes	DNQs	Withdrawals
1959		4+ of 32													
1960		1+ of 33													
1966		1+ of 30													
1969		1+ of 28													
1975		1+ of 13													
1980	14th	2 of 9	0	0	1	2	172	0	$2,740	14.0	7.0	2	1	1	0
1981	—N/a	1 of 8	0	0	0	0	2	0	$0	29.0	34.0	0	0		

=== ARCA Menards Series race statistics ===
ARCA Menards Series results
Year	Team	No.	Make	1	2	3	4	5	6	7	8	9	Ref
1980	Scorpion Race System	06	Plymouth	DAY	NWS	FRS	FRS	MCH; 4	TAL				
1980	n/a	06	Plymouth							IMS; DNQ	FRS		
1980	Test Tube	06	Volare									MCH; 10	
1981	Test Tube	06	Chevy	DAY; 34	DSP	FRS	FRS	BFS	TAL	FRS	COR	—N/a	
