= Bob Schacht =

American racing driver (born 1950)

- Born: Robert Earl Schacht; January 24, 1950 (age 76); Lombard, Illinois, U.S.

NASCAR Cup Series career
- 23 races run over 8 years
- Best finish: 40th (1992)
- First race: 1981 Champion Spark Plug 400 (Michigan)
- Last race: 1994 Miller Genuine Draft 500 (Pocono)
Wins	Top tens	Poles
0	0	0

NASCAR O'Reilly Auto Parts Series career
- 1 race run over 1 year
- Best finish: 79th (1984)
- First race: 1984 Red Carpet 200 (Milwaukee)
Wins	Top tens	Poles
0	0	0

NASCAR FedEx Freight Truck Series career
- 2 races run over 2 years
- Best finish: 65th (1997)
- First race: 1996 Sears Auto Center 200 (Milwaukee)
- Last race: 1997 Pennzoil Discount Center 200 (Loudon)
Wins	Top tens	Poles
0	0	0

ARCA Menards Series career
- 184 races run over 28 years
- Best finish: 3rd (1995)
- First race: 1980 Illiana ARCA 100 (Illiana)
- Last race: 2023 Zinsser SmartCoat 150 (Mid-Ohio)
- First win: 1980 Illiana ARCA 100 (Illiana)
- Last win: 1998 Memphis ARCA 100 (Memphis)
Wins	Top tens	Poles
17	90	16

Robert Earl Schacht (born January 24, 1950) is an American stock car racing driver. Now retired, he is a native of Lombard, Illinois. He competed in 26 NASCAR events between 1981 and 1997 in the Winston Cup, Busch Series, and Craftsman Truck Series. He had no top-ten finishes in NASCAR; he is best known for his ARCA career, where he has collected seventeen wins. After his retirement as a driver in ARCA following the 2016 season, he continued to field his No. 75 car for other drivers. He returned to the series as a driver in 2023 at Mid-Ohio.

Schacht is married to Patty Simko, a fellow racing driver.

In 2022, Schacht and wife Patty created the Grand National Super Series Presented By ECC, a tour featuring old Pro Cup cars, ARCA Menards Series cars, and a variety of other full bodied stock cars.

== Motorsports career results ==
=== NASCAR ===
(key) (Bold − Pole position awarded by qualifying time. Italics − Pole position earned by points standings or practice time. * – Most laps led.)

==== Winston Cup Series ====
NASCAR Winston Cup Series results
Year	Team	No.	Make	1	2	3	4	5	6	7	8	9	10	11	12	13	14	15	16	17	18	19	20	21	22	23	24	25	26	27	28	29	30	31	32	33	NWCC	Pts	Ref
1981	Bob Schacht Motorsports	97	Olds	RSD	DAY	RCH	CAR	ATL	BRI	NWS	DAR	MAR	TAL	NSV	DOV	CLT	TWS	RSD	MCH	DAY	NSV	POC	TAL	MCH; 32	BRI	DAR	RCH	DOV; 30	MAR	NWS	CLT	CAR	ATL; DNQ	RSD			70th	140	
1982	Bob Schacht Motorsports	97	Olds	DAY	RCH; 16	BRI	ATL	CAR	DAR	NWS; 27	MAR; 21	TAL	NSV; DNQ	DOV	CLT	POC	RSD	MCH	DAY	NSV	POC	TAL	MCH	BRI	DAR	RCH	DOV	NWS	CLT	MAR	CAR	ATL	RSD				52nd	297	
1988	Gordon Chilson	16	Ford	DAY	RCH	CAR	ATL	DAR	BRI	NWS	MAR	TAL	CLT	DOV	RSD	POC; 36	MCH	DAY	POC; 40	TAL	GLN	MCH	BRI	DAR													70th	98	
1988	Reet Racing	66	Buick																						RCH; 30	DOV	MAR	CLT	NWS	CAR	PHO	ATL					70th	98	
1989	George Hakes Racing	04	Ford	DAY	CAR	ATL	RCH	DAR	BRI	NWS	MAR	TAL	CLT	DOV	SON	POC	MCH	DAY	POC; 27	TAL	GLN	MCH	BRI	DAR	RCH	DOV	MAR	CLT	NWS								57th	170	
1989	Bob Schacht Motorsports	54	Buick																											CAR; 25	PHO	ATL					57th	170	
1990	Bob Schacht Motorsports	54	Olds	DAY	RCH	CAR	ATL	DAR	BRI	NWS	MAR	TAL	CLT	DOV	SON	POC	MCH	DAY	POC	TAL	GLN	MCH	BRI	DAR	RCH	DOV	MAR	NWS	CLT; DNQ	CAR	PHO	ATL					NA	-	
1992	Sadler Brothers Racing	95	Olds	DAY; 42	CAR	RCH	ATL; DNQ	DAR; 19	BRI	NWS	MAR	TAL; 30																									40th	611	
1992	Folsom Racing	13	Chevy				ATL; 42																														40th	611	
1992	Sadler Brothers Racing	95	Chevy										CLT; 31	DOV	SON	POC	MCH	DAY																			40th	611	
1992	Linro Motorsports	27	Chevy																POC; 38	TAL																	40th	611	
1992	Linro Motorsports	27	Olds																		GLN; 30	MCH	BRI	DAR	RCH	DOV	MAR	NWS									40th	611	
1992	Stringer Motorsports	57	Olds																										CLT; 22	CAR	PHO	ATL; 33					40th	611	
1993	Stringer Motorsports	57	Olds	DAY	CAR	RCH	ATL; 40	DAR; 27	BRI	NWS	MAR	TAL	SON	CLT	DOV	POC	MCH	DAY	NHA																		55th	180	
1993	Bob Schacht Motorsports	57	Olds																	POC; DNQ	TAL	GLN	MCH	BRI			DOV; 36	MAR	NWS	CLT	CAR	PHO	ATL; DNQ				55th	180	
1993	Mansion Motorsports	85	Ford																						DAR; 40	RCH											55th	180	
1994	Balough Racing	57	Ford	DAY	CAR	RCH	ATL	DAR; DNQ	BRI	NWS	MAR	TAL	SON	CLT	DOV	POC	MCH	DAY	NHA	POC; 42	TAL	IND; DNQ	GLN	MCH	BRI	DAR; DNQ	RCH	DOV	MAR	NWS	CLT	CAR	PHO	ATL			83rd	37	
1998	Sadler Brothers Racing	95	Chevy	DAY	CAR	LVS	ATL	DAR	BRI	TEX	MAR	TAL	CAL	CLT	DOV	RCH	MCH	POC	SON	NHA	POC	IND; DNQ	GLN	MCH	BRI	NHA	DAR	RCH	DOV	MAR	CLT	TAL	DAY	PHO	CAR	ATL	NA	-	

===== Daytona 500 =====
Year	Team	Manufacturer	Start	Finish
1992	Sadler Brothers Racing	Oldsmobile	36	42

==== Busch Series ====
NASCAR Busch Series results
Year	Team	No.	Make	1	2	3	4	5	6	7	8	9	10	11	12	13	14	15	16	17	18	19	20	21	22	23	24	25	26	27	28	29	NBSC	Pts	Ref
1984	Bob Schacht Motorsports	75	Pontiac	DAY	RCH	CAR	HCY	MAR	DAR	ROU	NSV	LGY	MLW; 15	DOV	CLT	SBO	HCY	ROU	SBO	ROU	HCY	IRP	LGY	SBO	BRI	DAR	RCH	NWS	CLT	HCY	CAR	MAR	79th	118	

==== Craftsman Truck Series ====
NASCAR Craftsman Truck Series results
Year	Team	No.	Make	1	2	3	4	5	6	7	8	9	10	11	12	13	14	15	16	17	18	19	20	21	22	23	24	25	26	NCTC	Pts	Ref
1996	Henriksen Racing	73	Ford	HOM	PHO	POR	EVG	TUS	CNS	HPT	BRI	NZH	MLW; 32	LVL	I70	IRP	FLM	GLN	NSV	RCH	NHA	MAR	NWS	SON	MMR	PHO	LVS			121st	67	
1997	Henriksen Racing	73	Ford	WDW; DNQ	TUS	HOM; DNQ	PHO	POR	EVG	I70	NHA; 24	TEX	BRI	NZH	MLW; DNQ	LVL	CNS	HPT	IRP; DNQ	FLM	NSV	GLN	RCH	MAR	SON	MMR	CAL	PHO	LVS	65th	278	

=== ARCA Menards Series ===
(key) (Bold – Pole position awarded by qualifying time. Italics – Pole position earned by points standings or practice time. * – Most laps led.)

ARCA Menards Series results
Year	Team	No.	Make	1	2	3	4	5	6	7	8	9	10	11	12	13	14	15	16	17	18	19	20	21	22	23	24	25	AMSC	Pts	Ref
1980	Reet Racing	75	Pontiac	DAY	NWS	FRS	FRS	MCH	TAL	IMS; 1*	FRS	MCH; 12																	18th	225	
1981	Reet Racing	75	Pontiac	DAY; 36	DSP; 3	FRS	FRS	BFS	TAL	FRS	COR																		NA	0	
1982	Reet Racing	75	Pontiac	**NSV**; 1*	DAY; DNQ	TAL	FRS	CMS	WIN; 17	NSV; 1	TAT	TAL	FRS	BFS	**MIL**; 23*	SND; 3													16th	465	
1983	Finney Racing	80	Buick	DAY; 13																									7th	1590	
1983	Reet Racing	75	Pontiac		NSV; 1*	TAL	**LPR**; 2	LPR; 4	ISF	**IRP**; 9	SSP; 13	FRS; 15	BFS	WIN; 3	LPR	POC; 1*	TAL	MCS; 2	FRS	**MIL**; 33	DSF; 26		**SND**; 1*						7th	1590	
1983	Reet Racing	57	Pontiac																			ZAN; 13							7th	1590	
1984	Reet Racing	75	Buick	DAY	ATL; 10	TAL																							13th	955	
1984	Reet Racing	75	Pontiac				CSP; 10	**SMS**; 10	FRS; 6	MCS; 7*	LCS	IRP; 1	TAL	FRS	ISF; 28	DSF; 32	TOL	**MGR**; 20											13th	955	
1985	Reet Racing	75	Pontiac	ATL; 8		ATL; 18	TAL; DNQ	ATL; 10	SSP	IRP	CSP	FRS	**IRP**; 1*	OEF; 1	ISF; 13	DSF; 16	TOL; 5												12th	1490	
1985	Reet Racing	75	Dodge		DAY; 37																								12th	1490	
1985	Peterson Motorsports	06	Buick				TAL; 23																						12th	1490	
1986	Reet Racing	75	Olds	ATL; 7															ATL; 14										5th	2335	
1986	Reet Racing	75	Chevy		DAY; 11	ATL; 4	TAL; QL^{†}						TAL; 13																5th	2335	
1986	Reet Racing	75	Pontiac					**SIR**; 1*	SSP; 5	FRS; 6	KIL; 5	CSP; 6		BLN; 6	ISF	DSF; 14	TOL; 16	MCS; 23											5th	2335	
1987	Reet Racing	75	Buick	DAY; 26	ATL; 2	TAL; 10	DEL	ACS	TOL		POC; 1*	FRS	KIL	TAL; 33						ATL; 17									13th	1720	
1987	Reet Racing	75	Chevy							ROC; 4					FRS; 16	ISF; 8	INF; 27	DSF	SLM; 3										13th	1720	
1988	Reet Racing	75	Chevy	DAY; 33*	ATL	TAL	FRS	PCS	ROC	POC	WIN	KIL	ACS	SLM	POC	TAL	DEL	FRS	ISF	DSF	SLM	ATL; 38							NA	0	
1989	Bob Schacht Motorsports	75	Chevy	DAY; DNQ	ATL	KIL	TAL	FRS																					22nd	775	
1989	Bob Schacht Motorsports	75	Buick						POC; 1	KIL	HAG	**POC**; 3	TAL	DEL	FRS	ISF	TOL	DSF	SLM; 1	ATL									22nd	775	
1990	Bob Schacht Motorsports	75	Buick	DAY	ATL	KIL	TAL; DNQ	FRS	POC	KIL	TOL	HAG	POC; 10	TAL															NA	0	
1990	Bob Schacht Motorsports	75	Olds												MCH; 24	ISF	TOL	DSF	WIN	DEL	ATL								NA	0	
1991	Bob Schacht Motorsports	75	Buick	DAY	ATL	KIL	TAL	TOL	FRS	POC; 24	**MCH**; 19	KIL	FRS	DEL	POC; 3	TAL	HPT	**MCH**; 11	ISF	TOL	DSF	TWS; 33							24th	995	
1991	Bob Schacht Motorsports	75	Olds																				**ATL**; 17						24th	995	
1992	Bob Schacht Motorsports	11	Buick	DAY	FIF	TWS	TAL	TOL	KIL	POC; 35	MCH	FRS	KIL	NSH	DEL	POC													NA	0	
1992	Bob Schacht Motorsports	75	Buick														HPT; 2	FRS	ISF; 4		DSF; 1								NA	0	
1992	Bob Schacht Motorsports	75	Olds																	TOL; 26		TWS; 40	SLM	ATL; 25					NA	0	
1993	Bob Schacht Motorsports	75	Olds	DAY; 33	FIF	TWS	TAL	KIL	CMS	FRS	TOL	POC; 1*	MCH; 8	FRS	POC; 35	KIL	ISF; 22	DSF	TOL	SLM; 9	WIN	ATL; 31							NA	0	
1994	Bob Schacht Motorsports	75	Olds	DAY; 14	TAL; 37						MCH; 38	DMS	POC; 10	POC; 4	KIL	FRS	INF	I70	ISF	DSF	TOL	SLM; 28	WIN; 4						14th	2515	
1994	Bob Schacht Motorsports	75	Buick			FIF; 7	LVL; 7	KIL; 10	TOL; 8	FRS; 9																			14th	2515	
1994	Bob Schacht Motorsports	75	Ford																					ATL; 36					14th	2515	
1995	Bob Schacht Motorsports	75	Ford	**DAY**; 17	ATL; 11	**TAL**; 9				MCH; 4		MCS; 10	FRS; 13	POC; 2	POC; 3	KIL; 18	FRS; 19		LVL; 5			SLM; 20		ATL; 10					3rd	5290	
1995	Bob Schacht Motorsports	75	Buick				FIF; 1	KIL; 4	FRS; 4		I80; 15							SBS; 16		ISF; 12*	DSF; 5		WIN; 7						3rd	5290	
1996	Bob Schacht Motorsports	75	Ford	DAY; 8	ATL	SLM; 2	TAL	FIF	LVL	CLT	CLT	KIL	FRS	POC	MCH	FRS	TOL	POC	MCH						SLM; 4	WIN; 9	CLT	ATL	NA	0	
1996	Bob Schacht Motorsports	75	Buick																	INF; 20	SBS	ISF	DSF; 28	KIL					NA	0	
1997	Bob Schacht Motorsports	75	Ford	DAY	ATL	SLM; 6	CLT	CLT	POC	MCH	SBS	TOL	KIL	FRS	MIN	POC	MCH	DSF	GTW	SLM; 25	WIN; 7	CLT; 31	TAL	ISF	ATL				NA	0	
1998	Bob Schacht Motorsports	75	Ford	DAY	ATL	SLM	CLT	**MEM**; 1*	MCH; 23	POC; 26	SBS	TOL	PPR	POC; 9	KIL	FRS	ISF	ATL	DSF	SLM; 3	TEX	WIN; 6	CLT	TAL	ATL				NA	0	
1999	Bob Schacht Motorsports	75	Ford	DAY; 16	ATL; 35	SLM; 6	AND; 4	CLT; 23	MCH; 31	POC; 4	TOL; 3	SBS; 22	BLN; 24	POC; 22	KIL; 12	FRS; 5	FLM; 7	ISF; 15	WIN; 23	DSF; 15	SLM; 11	CLT; 35	TAL; 4	ATL; 28					7th	4410	
2000	Bob Schacht Motorsports	75	Ford	DAY; 37	SLM; 16	AND; DNQ	CLT; 31	KIL	FRS	MCH; 26	POC; 12	TOL	KEN; 19	BLN	POC; 39	WIN; 9	ISF	KEN; 6	DSF	SLM; 10	CLT; 28	TAL; 16	ATL						21st	1545	
2008	Bob Schacht Motorsports	75	Ford	DAY	SLM	IOW	KAN	CAR	KEN	TOL	POC	MCH	CAY	KEN	BLN	POC	NSH	ISF	DSF	CHI	SLM	NJE; 9	TAL	TOL					100th	185	
2009	Bob Schacht Motorsports	75	Chevy	DAY	SLM	CAR	TAL	KEN	TOL	POC	MCH	MFD	IOW	KEN	BLN	POC	ISF	CHI	TOL	DSF	NJE; 22	SLM	KAN	CAR					133rd	120	
2010	Bob Schacht Motorsports	75	Chevy	DAY	PBE	SLM	TEX	TAL	TOL	POC	MCH	IOW	MFD	POC	BLN	NJE; 21	ISF	CHI	DSF	TOL	SLM	KAN	CAR						111th	125	
2011	Bob Schacht Motorsports	75	Chevy	DAY	TAL	SLM	TOL	NJE; 25	CHI	POC	MCH	WIN	BLN	IOW	IRP	POC	ISF	MAD	DSF	SLM	KAN	TOL							140th	105	
2015	Bob Schacht Motorsports	75	Chevy	DAY	MOB	NSH	SLM	TAL	TOL	NJE; 11	POC	MCH	CHI	WIN	IOW	IRP	POC	BLN	ISF	DSF	SLM	KEN	KAN						100th	175	
2016	Bob Schacht Motorsports	75	Toyota	DAY	NSH	SLM	TAL	TOL	NJE; 12	POC	MCH	MAD	WIN	IOW	IRP	POC	BLN	ISF	DSF	SLM	CHI	KEN	KAN						108th	170	
2023	Bob Schacht Motorsports	75	Chevy	DAY	PHO	TAL	KAN	CLT	BLN	ELK	MOH; 14	IOW	POC	MCH	IRP	GLN; Wth	ISF	MLW	DSF	KAN	BRI	SLM	TOL						94th	30	
^{†} - Qualified but replaced by Davey Allison

=== International Racing Association ===
Schacht was the 1983 and 1984 season champion of the International Racing Association, and raced in all four seasons of the short-lived series (1982–1985).
