= Brett Sontag =

American racing driver

Brett "The Jet" Sontag
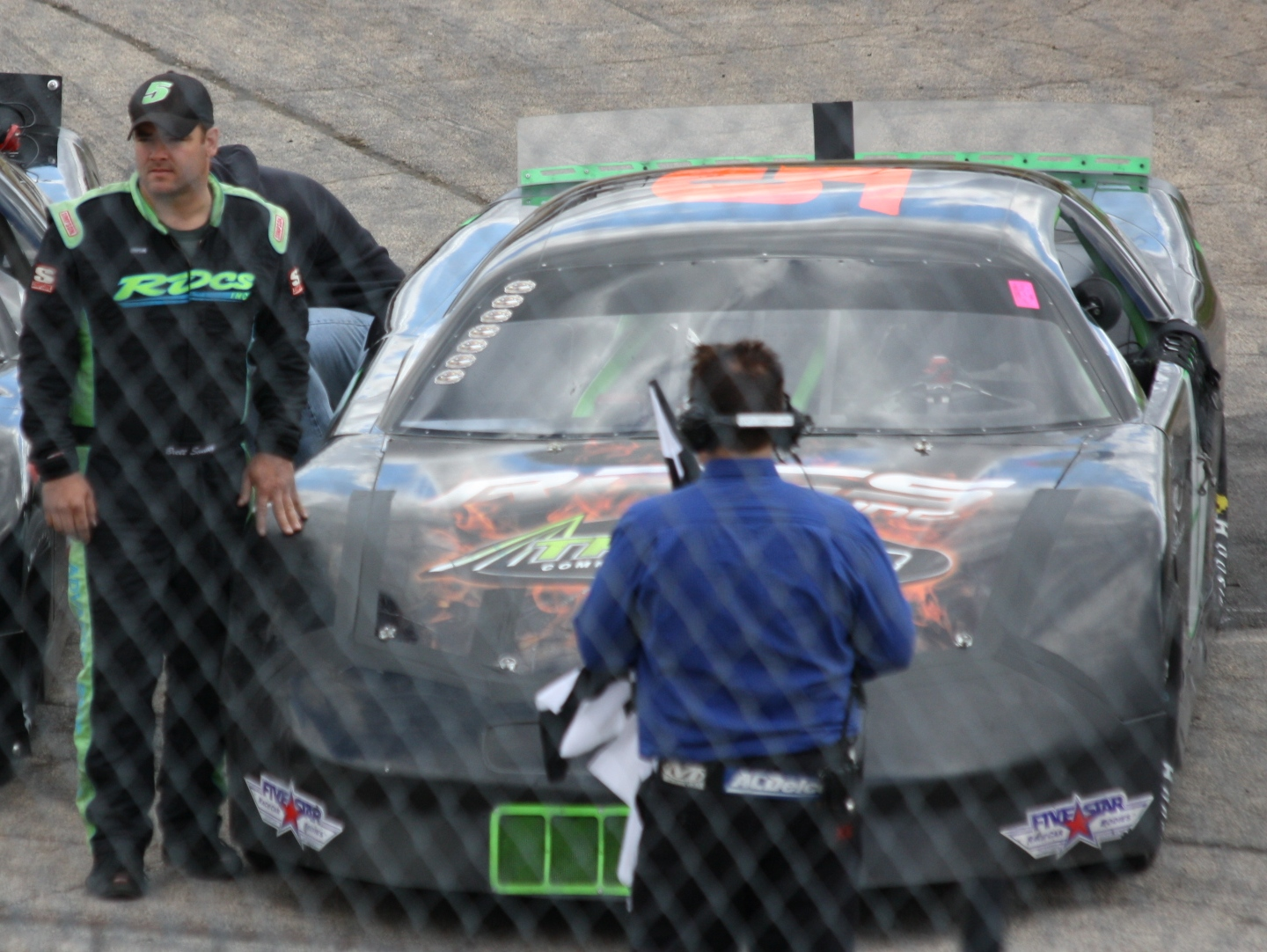
- Born: October 29, 1970 (age 55); Joliet, Illinois, U.S.
- Achievements: 1988 Street Stock Champion - Grundy County Speedway 1991 Late Model Rookie of the Year - Grundy County Speedway 2001 / 2002 / 2008 / 2009 / 2010 Super Late Model Champion - Grundy County Speedway 2002 / 2005 / 2008 Lee Schuler Memorial Race Winner - Grundy County Speedway 2004 American Speed Association (ASA) Pat Schauer Memorial Rookie of the Year 2008 / 2009 / 2011 Tony Bettenhausen Classic Race Winner - Illiana Motor Speedway 2009 Illiana Derby "Run for the Roses 100" Race Winner - Illiana Motor Speedway 2010 / 2014 Frank Welch Memorial Race Winner - Grundy County Speedway 2010 National Short Track Champion - Rockford Speedway 2012 Firecracker 50 Champion - Grundy County Speedway
- Awards: Ranked 17th in Speed 51's 2009 National Short Track Power Ranking

Brett Sontag (born October 29, 1970) is an American professional stock car driver from Joliet, Illinois. He currently drives the No. 5 Chevrolet Impala at various midwest racetracks including the Grundy County Speedway in Morris, Illinois, the Illiana Motor Speedway in Schererville, Indiana and at select CRA Super Series, ASA Late Model Series, and ASA Midwest Tour events. He previously competed in the American Speed Association National Tour and the NASCAR RE/MAX Challenge Series.

As of 2012, Sontag is tied for most track championships at the Grundy County Speedway with the late Ed Hoffman Sr., each claiming six titles to their name. He is also one of only two drivers to ever win back-to-back-to-back championships at Grundy County.

== Racing career ==
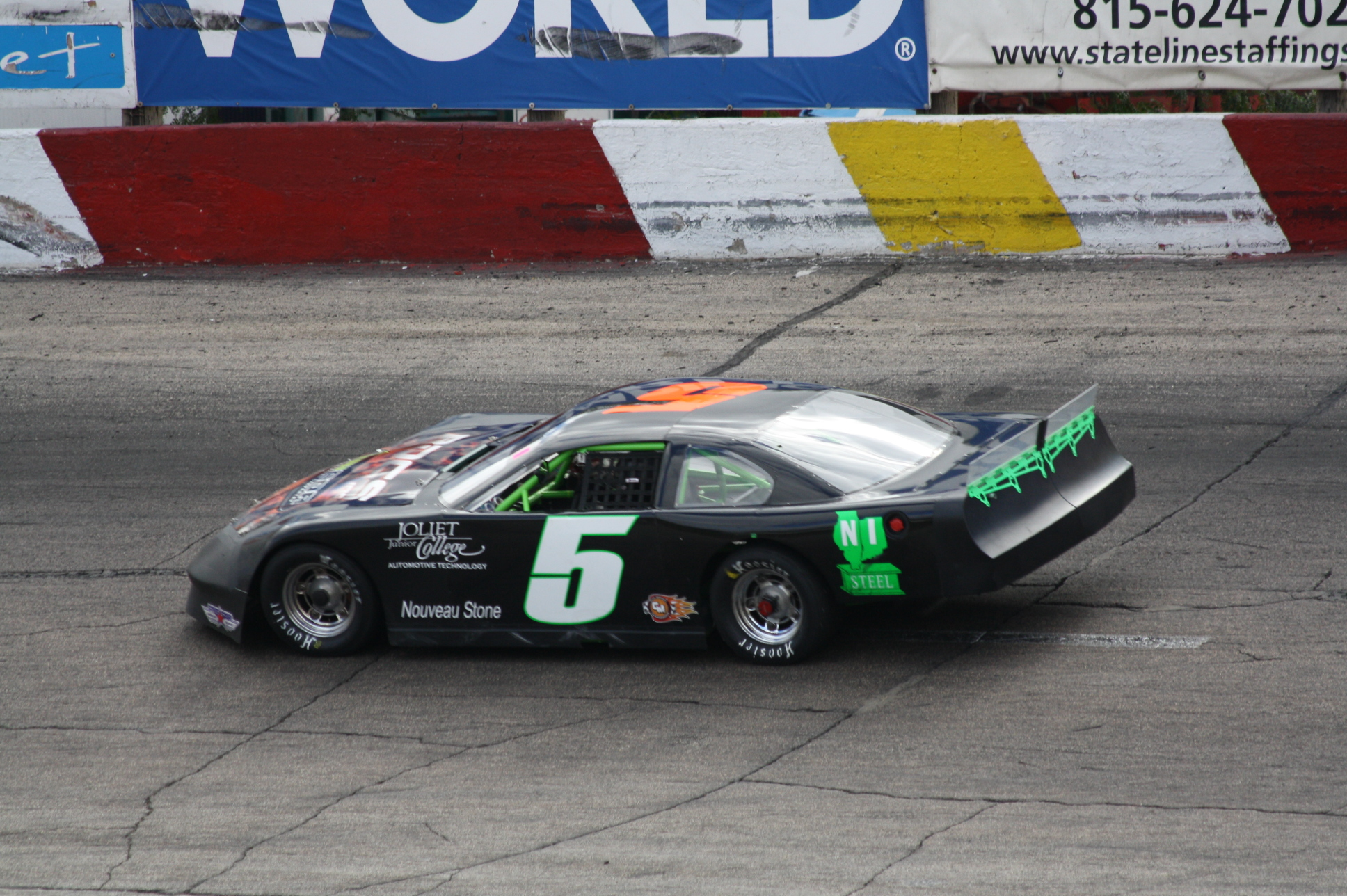
Sontag at the 2010 National Short Track championship.

Sontag won his first championship at the age of 18 in 1988 at the Grundy County Speedway in the Street Stock Division. He captured the Super Late Model Championship in 2001 and 2002 at the Grundy County Speedway. In 2003, he began racing in the American Speed Association National Tour. He competed in twenty-two races between those two years for Terry's Motorsports. He scored eight top-ten finishes, three top-five finishes, and one pole. In 2004, Sontag won the Pat Schuaer Rookie of the Year title. Previous winners include Reed Sorenson, David Stremme, Jimmie Johnson, Johnny Benson and Kenny Wallace.

After the demise of the ASA National Tour, Sontag returned to racing at Illinois short tracks. He won the 2008, 2009 and 2010 super late model championships at the Grundy County Speedway in Morris, Illinois, winning a combined 23 feature events over those three years. He also won the 2008 and 2009 Lee Schuler Memorial Race at the Grundy County Speedway, and the 2008 and 2009 Bettenhausen Memorial race at the Illiana Motor Speedway. Following the 2009 racing season, Sontag was ranked 17th in Speed 51's National Short Track Power Rankings for that year. He won the 2010 National Short Track Championship race at Rockford Speedway.
