= Motorsport at Soldier Field =

Soldier Field
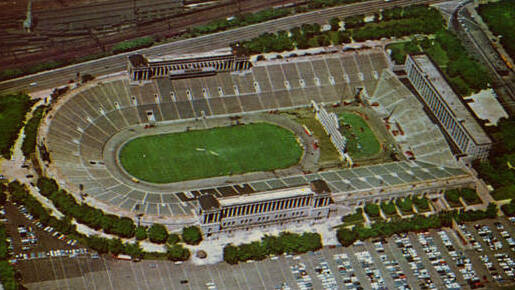
- Soldier Field, circa 1963
- Location: Chicago, Illinois
- Coordinates: 41.8623°N 87.6167°W
- Capacity: 100,000+ (total stadium capacity)
- Owner: Chicago Park District
- Broke ground: August 11, 1922
- Opened: October 9, 1924 (as stadium); May 19, 1935 (first race on track)
- Closed: July 4, 1970 (final race on track) –venue still in use for other purposes
- Architect: Holabird & Roche
- Major events: Past: AAA and USAC Stock Car; USAC National Midget Series; NASCAR Cup Series (untitled race); NASCAR Convertible Division; IMCA Stock Car; MARC Racing Series
- Surface: Cinder (before 1941); Wood (temporarily, in 1939); Clay (1941–1946); Asphalt (1946 onwards)
- Length: 0.25 and 0.5 mi (0.40 and 0.80 km)
- Turns: 4

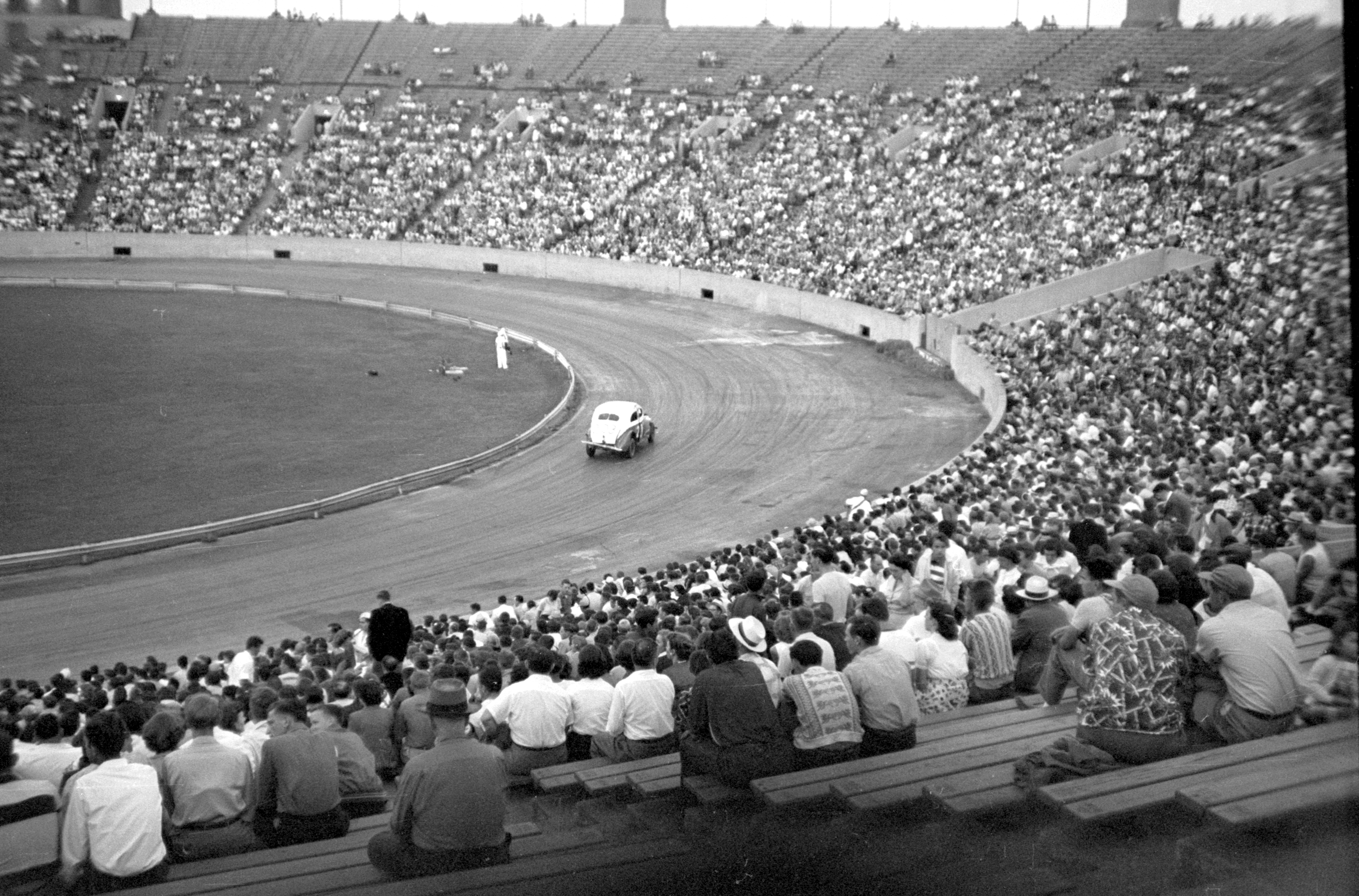
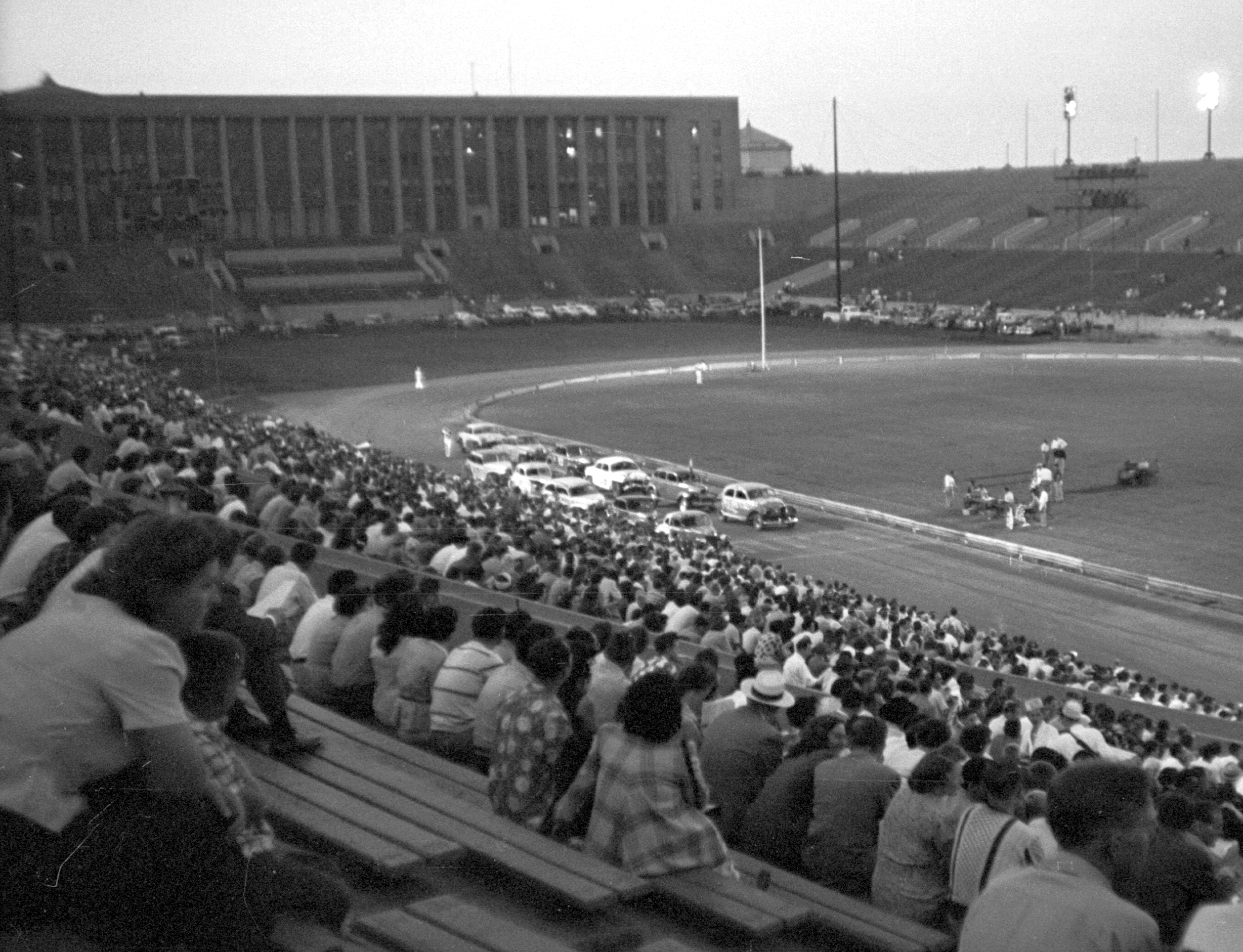
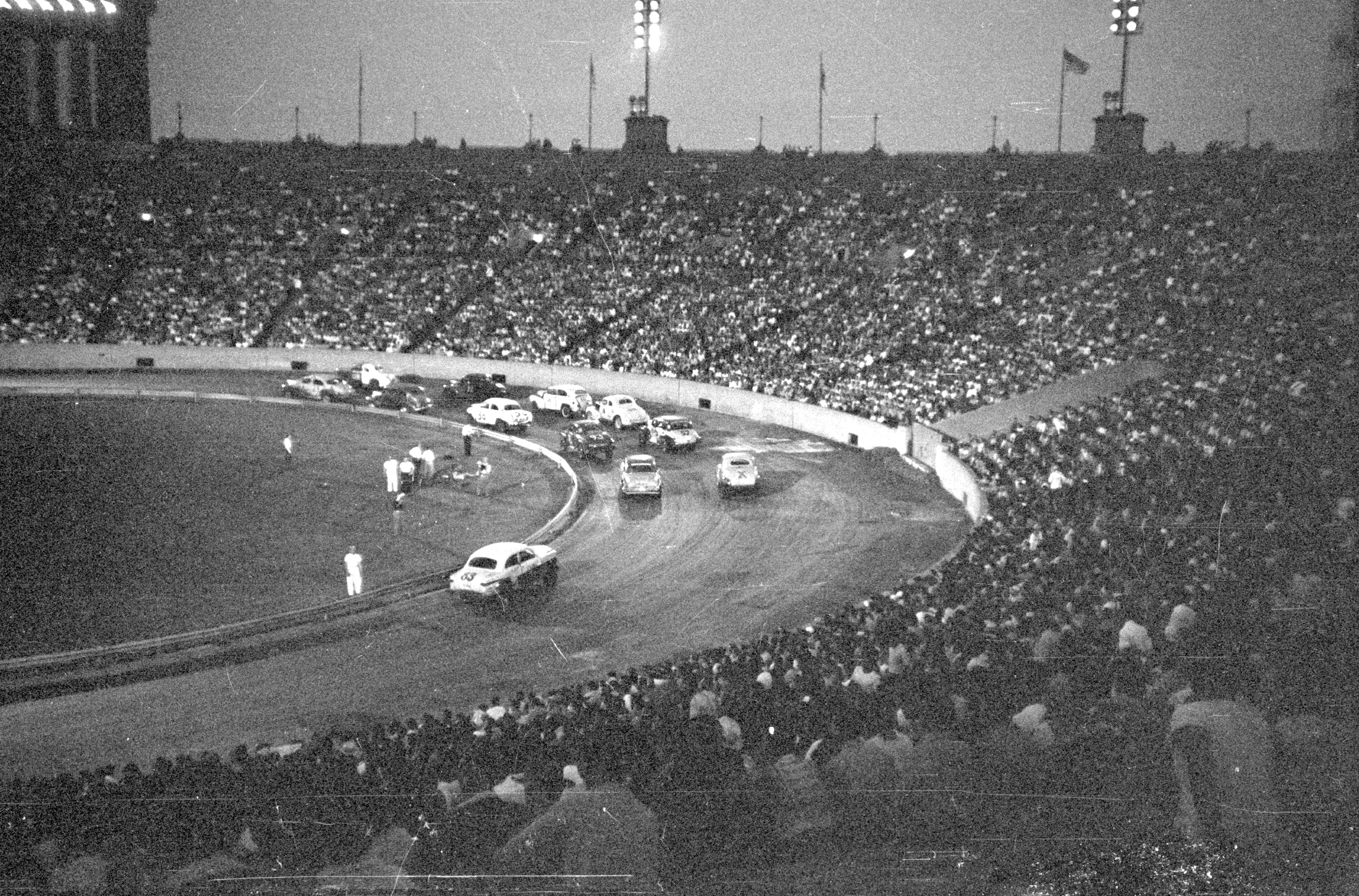
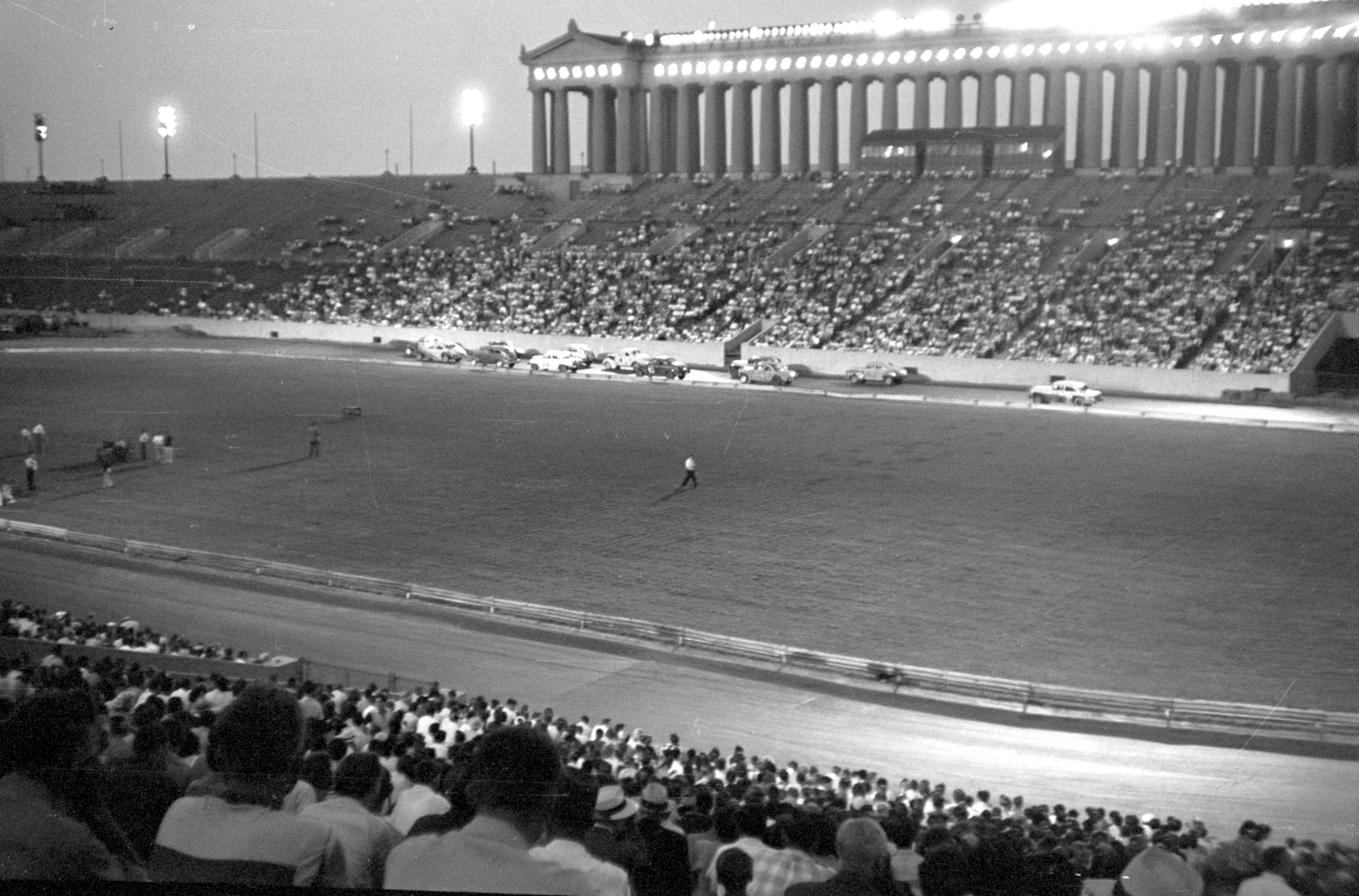
Racing at Soldier Field in 1951

From the 1940s until 1968, Soldier Field (a stadium in the United States city of Chicago) was regularly used as a motorsport venue. During this time, the stadium had a short track, which was first used for auto racing in 1935 and was last used in 1970.

== General history of the racetrack ==
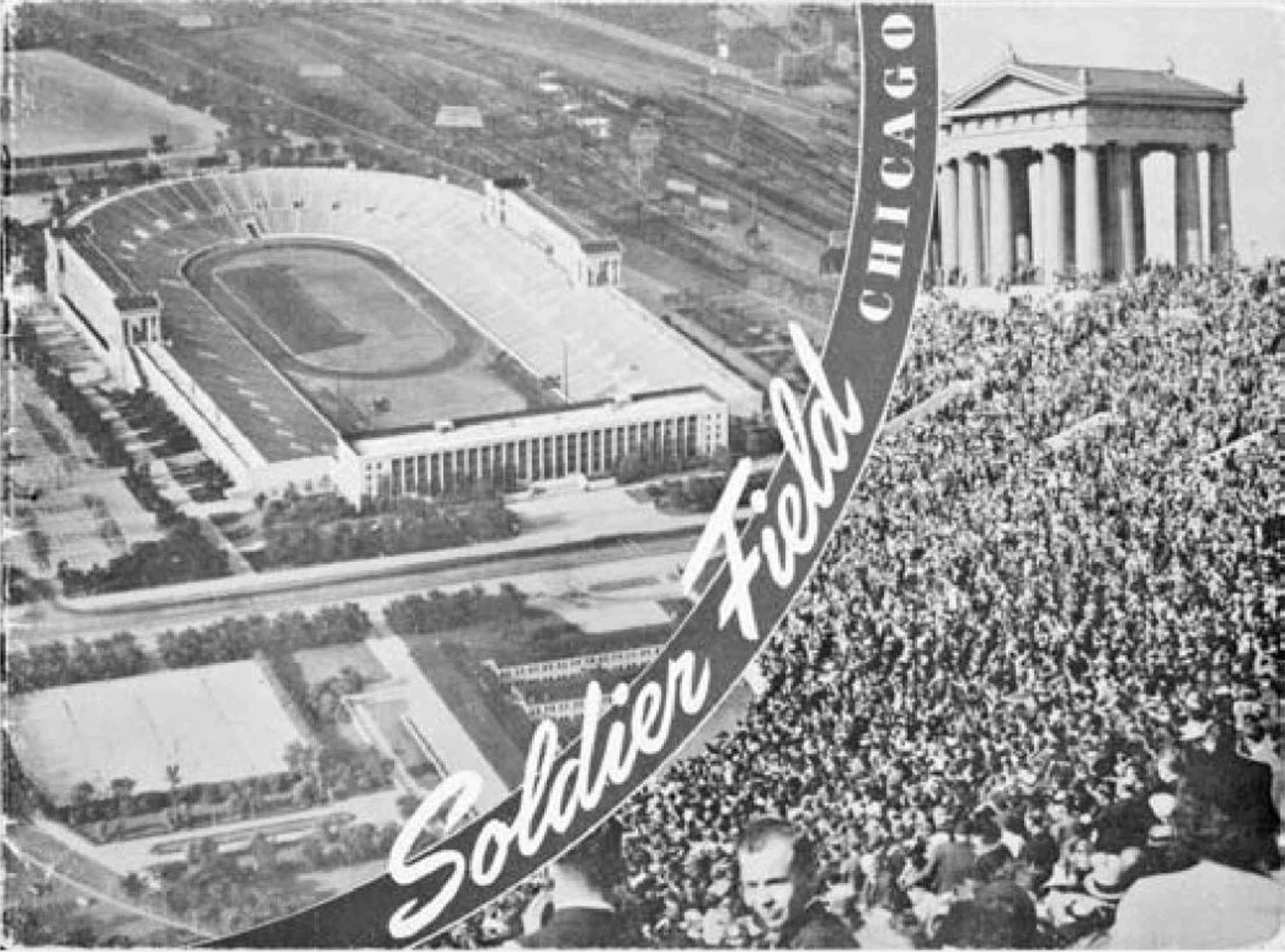
Marketing brochure for Soldier Field, published circa 1952, with track visible in overhead view

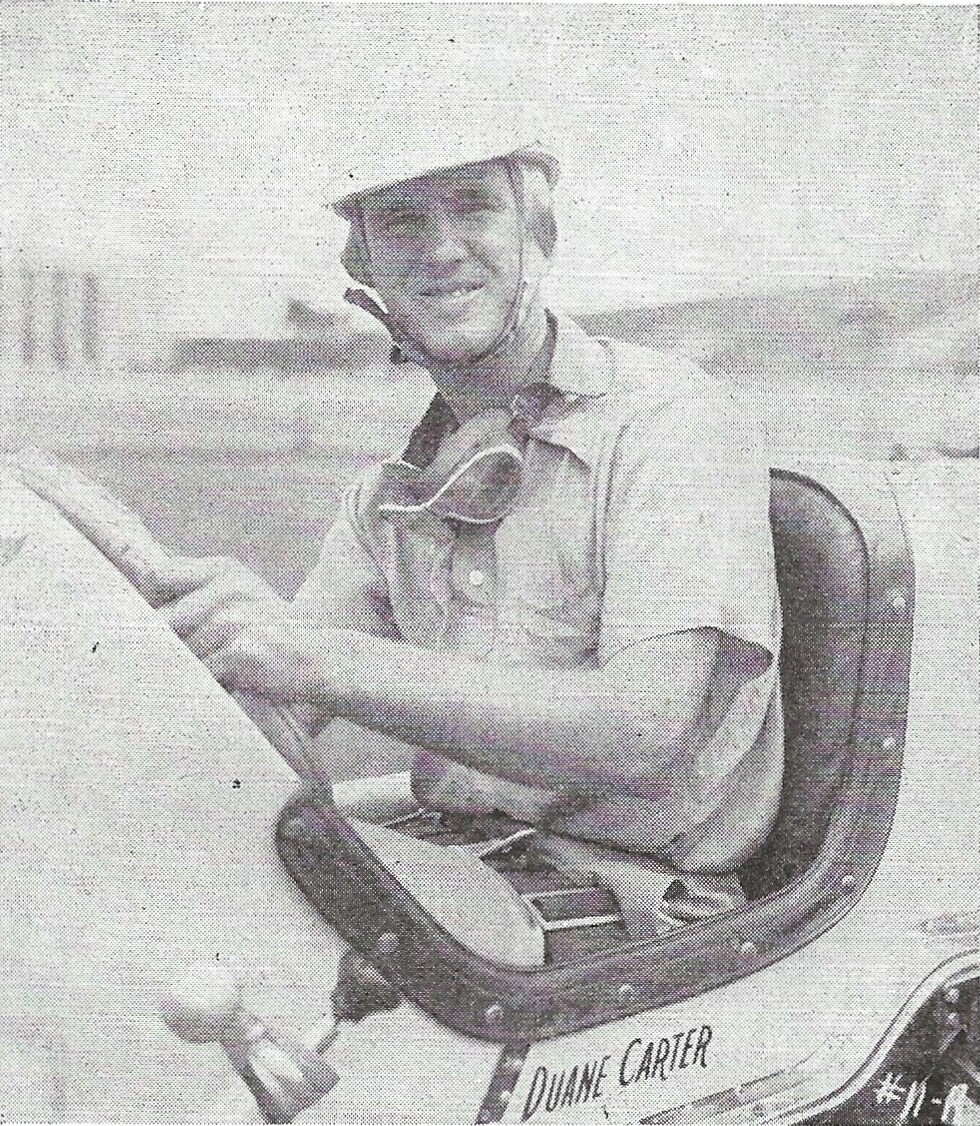
Duane Carter at Soldier Field in the 1940s

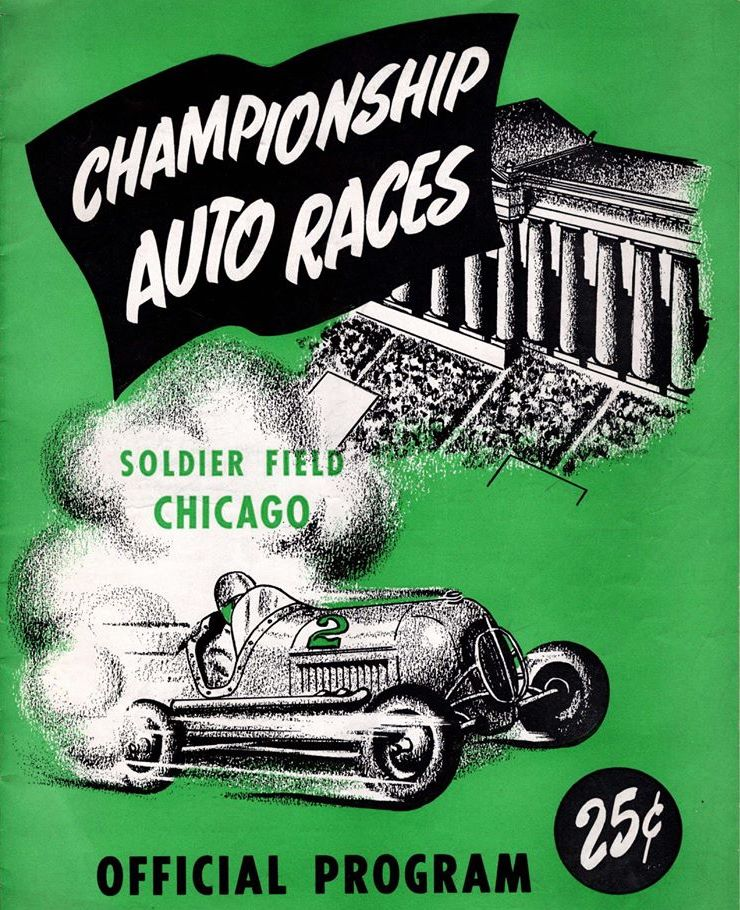
Cover artwork for 1947 program

Motorsport at Soldier Field began at the stadium's opening event on September 5, 1924, an athletics meet for the Chicago Police Benevolent Association which featured motoball (motorcycle polo) as an event. However, motorsport races did not occur at the stadium until the following decade. In the 1930s, a cinder track was erected inside of the stadium. The first auto racing event held at the stadium occurred in 1935. The track remained cinder until 1941. However, in June 1939, a temporary wooden racetrack was built with banked turns for use in a single event. In 1941, the track was turned into a clay ("dirt") track, before ultimately being paved with asphalt in 1946. Several types of motorsports used this track.

Racing paused at the venue after the summer of 1942 amid the United States' entrance into World War II. This hiatus was a result of wartime fuel restrictions and the refocusing of the United States auto industry on manufacturing military vehicles. After the war, the midget car racing that had previously been held at the stadium returned, accompanied by the arrival of stock car racing. The track was paved in 1946 when the newly-founded Chicago Auto Racing Association, headed by Art Folz, began hosting regular midget automobile races on the track.

Originally, the stadium's track was quarter-mile oval. In 1956, the track was extended to have a half-mile oval layout, with the track extending further into the north end of the stadium. In 1961, the track layout was paved to restore use of this secondary half-mile oval arrangement. At this time, a separate eighth-mile go-kart track was also built in the north end of the stadium. The track encircled sports pitch of the stadium, which was regularly used for college football games during many of the years races were held on the track. The presence of a football pitch inside of a motorsports short track has few parallels in modern professional motorsports, with one notable exception being Bowman Gray Stadium. Barriers were placed on the inside of the track in order to protect the sports pitch.

In the 1940s and 1950s, Soldier Field was one of the United States' most popular motorsport venues. In 1947, auto races were held nearly every weekend from June until the end of September. In the 1950s, racing events held at the stadium often attracted in excess of 20,000. It was not uncommon for attendance to even surpass 30,000 spectators or reach 40,000. The races proved to be popular outings for families. At this time, Andy Granatelli was a key promoter of races at the racetrack, regularly organizing races at the stadium. For many years, Granatelli held weekly local races at the track, which were geared towards entertaining large crowds. In 1956 and 1957, NASCAR held several races at the venue.

No races were held at the stadium in 1959, a hiatus caused by the stadium's use for the 1959 Pan American Games hosted in the city. The 1959 racing hiatus has been retrospectively credited by some of the track's racers, such as Pistone, as contributing to a loss of subsequent interest in races at the track during the 1960s. Other causes cited for waning interest in Soldier Field races during the 1960s include an increase in attention garnered by Chicago's teams in the major professional sports leagues. After the 1964 season, promoters Bill Schade and Carl Bledsoe decided to stop organizing races at the track, resulting in no races be held there in 1965. The following year, however, races resumed on the track, with Bill Earnest beginning to organize races at the stadium.

Tom Pistone won the most races at the track, winning 38 events. Several successful drivers launched their careers on Soldier Field's racetrack. For instance, Jim Rathmann launched his racing career at Soldier Field in 1948. He would later win the Indy 500 in 1960.

Accidents occasionally took place at the track. The 1951 Chicago Park District Police Benevolent Association Gold Trophy Race saw Joe Lacoco and Ralph Castillio become seriously injured in a three car wreck and be taken to a hospital. In a May 2, 1954 "tag racing" event, two cars caught fire. The track crew was fast to put out the fire. A June 6, 1954 event saw a car at a racing event hit a barricade and knock several timbers loose without causing any serious damage or injury. In a June 1956 race, a car being driven by Les Olsen rolled over twice on its side and on its end three times, before being struck by a car driven bay Roy Czach and then crashing into the track's south turn. In a July 1950 race, two individuals were injured when a stock car driven by Harry Bennett crashed through a steel gate behind which the two individuals were standing. Andy Granatelli has been accused of having encouraged stock-car racers to intentionally wreck other drivers' cars in order to manufacture greater action for spectators.

Racing largely ceased after the 1968 season. A major factor that had contributed to the end of auto racing at the track was a decline in the appeal that the races had to Chicagoans, whose attention had become increasingly diverted to other sports. Another contributing factor was the loss of the highly-successful Granatelli as a promoter of races at Soldier Field. Furthermore, by this time, a number of other short track racing venues had opened in the Chicago area, providing competition for the local market's racing audience. On July 4, 1970, the final auto race on the stadium's track took place, with drag races being organized during the American Legion's annual Independence Day celebrations. Later that year, the track was removed from the stadium. In 1971, the Chicago Bears of the NFL moved into Soldier Field, and the stadium's stands were reconfigured with temporary northern stands in order to better accommodate American football. This arrangement of the stadium would not be able to accommodate a racing track. This configuration was made permanent in a 1979 renovation that built a permanent northern stand for football that cut-off much of the northern expanse of the original stadium layout, thus further preventing a return of racing.

== Midget car racing ==
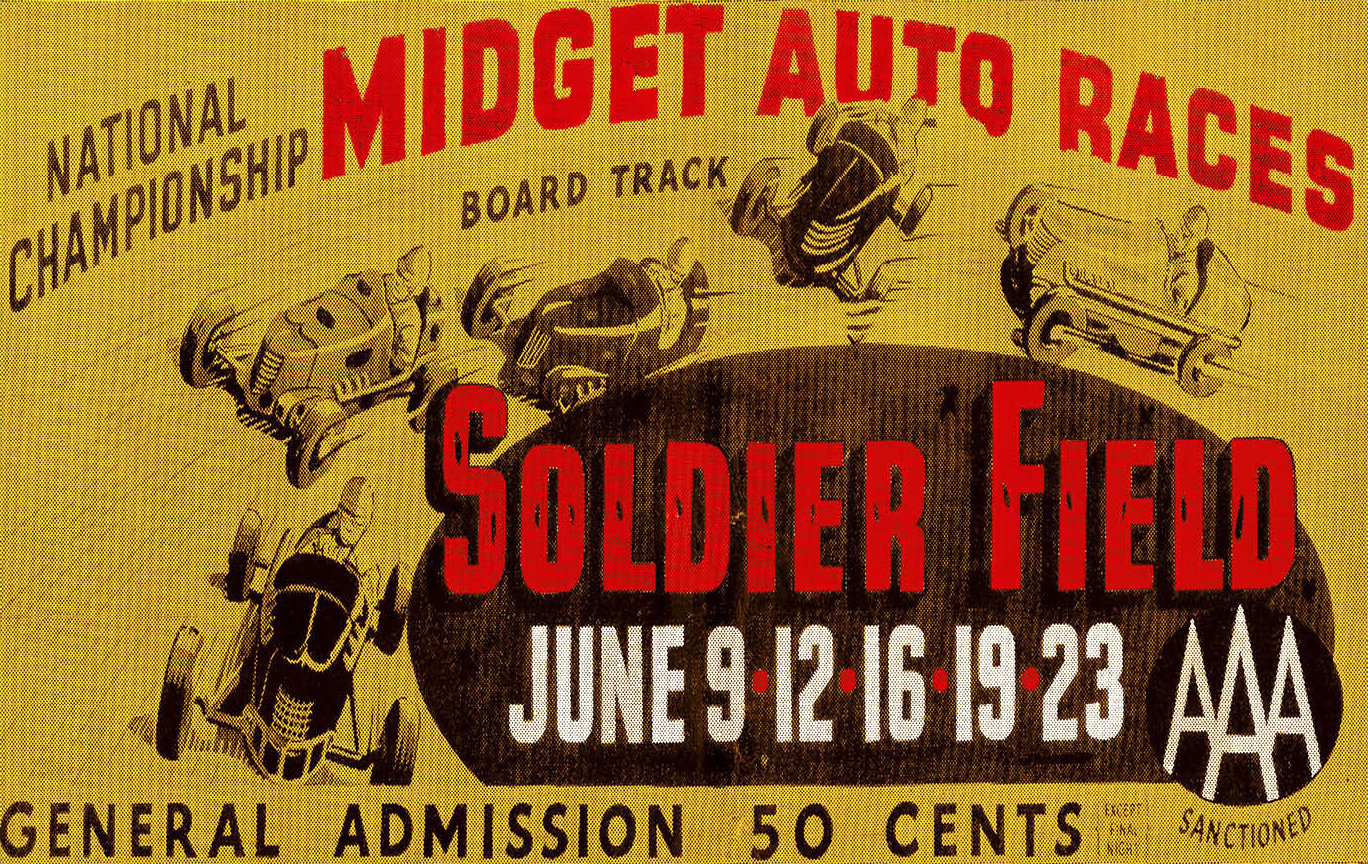
Advertisement for the stadium's second racing event in 1939

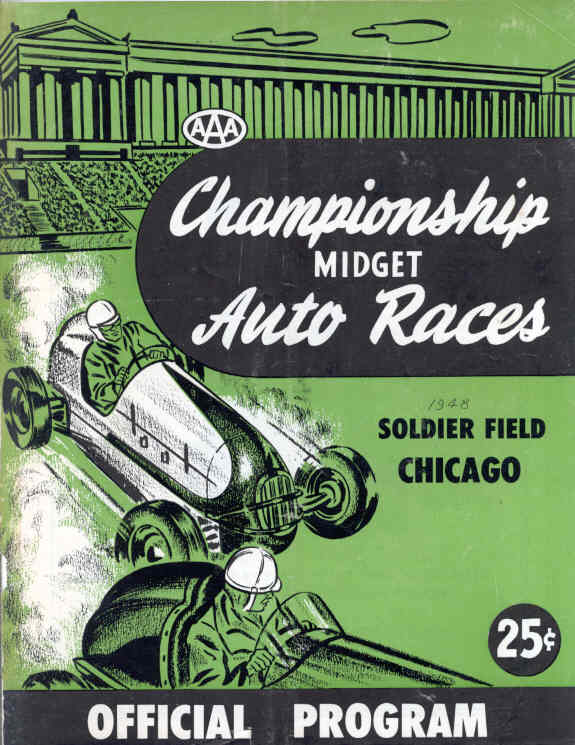
1948 program cover for midget auto races at Soldier Field

For decades, Soldier Field had a tradition of midget car racing. This began on May 19, 1935, when midget racing star Marshall Lewis won the main event of the first racing event held at the stadium. 20,000 spectators watched the Midwestern Auto Racing Association race on the stadium's cinder track. Some minor racing events were held thereafter, however the next significant race occurred in 1939.

In June 1939, the AAA Contest Board held the World's Championship Midget Automobile Race, the second-ever instance of midget racing at the stadium. Races were held on a wooden track erected at the stadium. Proceeds benefited the Hospital for Crippled Children's Chicago Unit. There was a $10,000 purse for the five-race series. Over 90,000 spectators attended the event. This was the second time that midget racing was held at Soldier Field. Sam Hanks won the first two races, and Ronnie Householder ultimately won Soldier Field's 1939 midget racing championship held as the finale of the event. The race saw the temporary erection and use of the largest wooden oval ever constructed up to that time. The 0.25-mile (0.40 km) wooden oval measured 28 feet (8.5 m) in track width and had a 6 feet (1.8 m) field apron. It had banked 30° turns, and engineers estimated that drivers could race on it at speeds of 100 miles per hour (160 km/h). The oval cost $25,000 to erect. Proceeds from the race benefited the Shriners’ Hospital for Crippled Children Chicago Unit.

After World War II, the stadium's track became a "hotbed" for midget racing. In 1946, the Chicago Auto Racing Association began hosting regular midget automobile races at the stadium. In 1948, Prince Bertil, Duke of Halland, a member of the Swedish royal family, drove a midget car around the track for fun while in Chicago on an official visit. July 23, 1954, the stadium hosted the midget auto racing 100 Lap National Championship. Racers included Tony Bettenhausen, Duke Nalon, Art Cross, Mike Nazurek, Frank Burany, Roy Newman, Gene Hartley, Jimmy Knight, Cal Niday, Johnny Roberts, Jack Bates, among others. A midget racing event the night of July 20, 1957 was one of the earliest at Soldier Field to be televised. On August 14, 1955, the track held a AAA National Midget Car Series race, which was won by Chuck Rodee. On July 23, 1966, Mike McGreevy won the last United States Auto Club midget feature race held at Soldier Field. The final season of midget racing at the stadium, in 1968, saw races hosted by the United Auto Racing Association.

=== Midget racing championship winners ===
Soldier Field midget racing championship winners
Year	Winner	Attendance
1939	Ronnie Householder	
1941		40,000
1946	Ted Duncan	
1947	Ted Duncan	
1948	Johnny McDowell	
1949	Eddie Haddad	
1950	Potsy Goacher	

=== AAA National Midget Car Series ===
Several AAA National Midget Car Series races were held at Soldier Field between 1953 and 1955.

Summary of AAA National Midget Car Series races at Soldier Field
Date	Laps	Track length (mi)	Race length (mi)	Winner	Ref
June 13, 1953	50	0.25	12.5	Art Cross	
July 11, 1953	50	0.25	12.5	Leroy Warriner	
August 8, 1953	100			Mike Nazaruk	
August 14, 1955	100			Chuck Rodee	

=== USAC National Midget Car Series ===
Several USAC National Midget Car Series races were held at Soldier Field between 1957 and 1964.

Summary of USAC National Midget Car Series races at Soldier Field
Date	Laps	Winner
June 8, 1957	100	Frank Burany
July 27, 1957	100	Frank Burany
August 2, 1958	100	Eddie Johnson
June 29, 1960		Leroy Warriner
July 9, 1960		Gene Hartley
July 27, 1960		Leroy Warriner
June 3, 1961		Jimmy Davies
July 1, 1961		Tommy Copp
August 11, 1962		Ronnie Duman
June 8, 1963		Johnny Riva
June 6, 1964		Tommy Copp

== Stock car racing ==
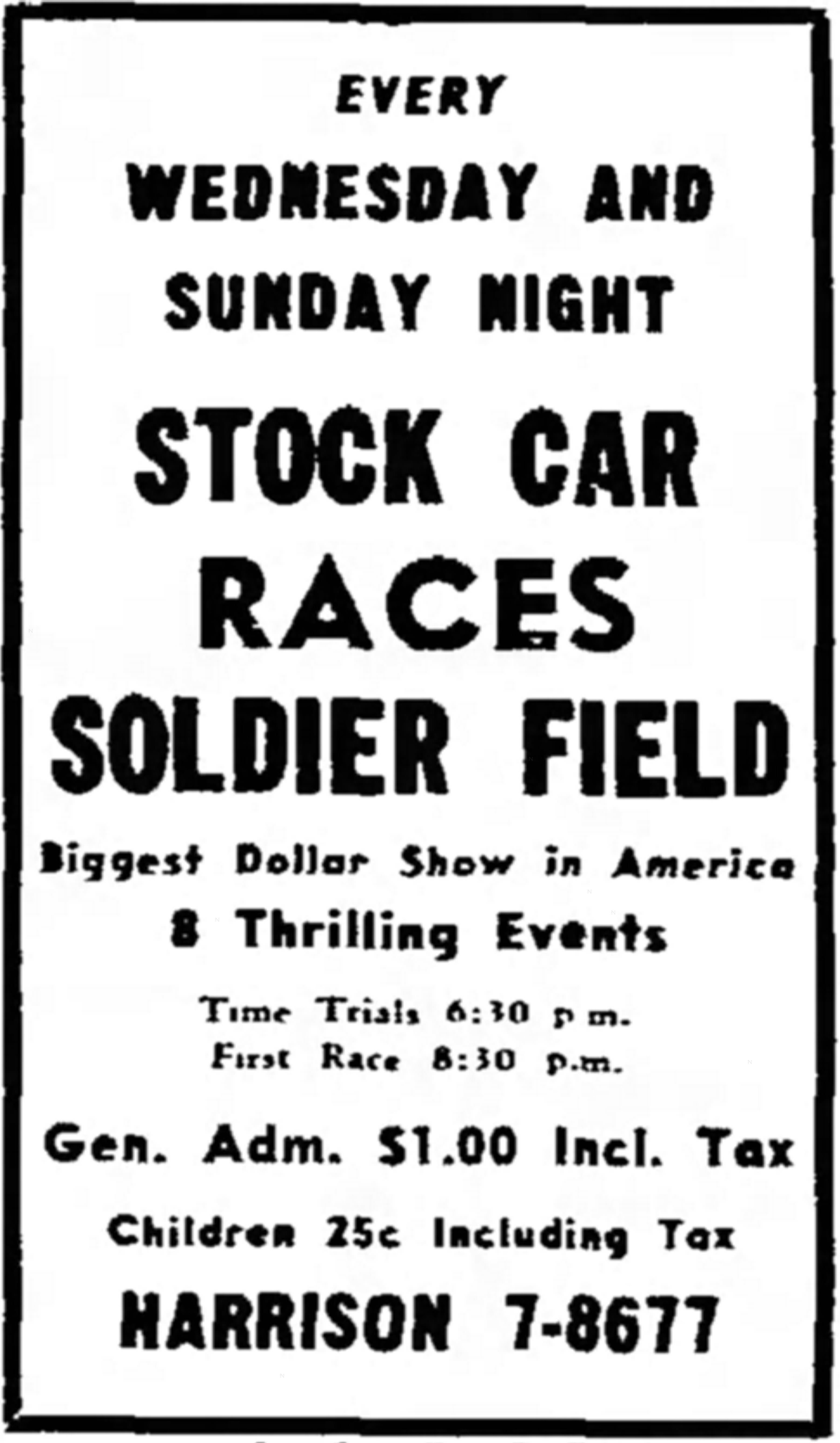
1951 newspaper advertisement for stock car racing at Soldier Field

Stock car racing was introduced to the track in 1950. Stock car races were held until June 7, 1968, when Sal Tovella won what was the last stock car race at Soldier Field.

Many stock car races held at Soldier Field were late model races.

=== Stock car championship winners ===
Winners of the track's annual stock car championships:

- 1949: Gil "Skippy" Michaels
- 1950: Jim Rathmann
- 1951: Jim Rathmann
- 1952: Sal Tovella
- 1953: Tom Pistone
- 1954: Tom Pistone
- 1955: Tom Pistone
- 1956: Fred Lorenzen
- 1957: Don Oldenberg
- 1958: Don Oldenberg
- 1959: no races held due to the stadium's hosting of the 1959 Pan American Games
- 1960: Bryant Tucker
- 1961: Bryant Tucker
- 1962: Bryant Tucker
- 1963: Sal Tovella
- 1964: Two championships held
  - May 3: Bill Lutz
  - May 9: Harry Simonsen
- 1965: no races held
- 1966: Whitey Gerken
- 1967: Norm Nelson

Note: In 1967, the championship was organized by the United States Auto Club.

=== Rookie/novice stock car championship winners ===
Winners of the track's annual rookie/novice stock car championships:

- 1956: Bert Olson
- 1957: Lou Hoehn
- 1958: Marty Boecher
- 1959: no races held due to stadium's hosting of the 1959 Pan American Games
- 1960: Eddie Maurer
- 1961: Pete Schintgen
- 1962: Marty Boecher
- 1963: Jerry Bloom

=== NASCAR ===
To accommodate NASCAR races, a new half-mile track layout was added to the stadium in 1956 by adding new paved track to the north end of the stadium.

==== NASCAR Convertible Division ====
NASCAR Convertible Division races were held at Soldier Field in both 1956 and 1957 at Soldier Field. A race on June 30, 1956 was the first NASCAR Convertible Division race at the stadium, and saw Tom Pistone (in what was the biggest win of his career up-to-that-time) place first over Curtis Turner by three car-lengths after overtaking Turner (who had led since the start of the race) in the 194th lap. This race was the first race on Soldier Field's half-mile layout. Women's world land speed record holder Betty Skelton was selected to drive the pace car during this race. 38,000 saw Tom Pistone win. The "Soldier Field 500"/“Chicagoland 500” was held on September 9, 1956, featuring an unprecedentedly large purse and distance for a convertible division race. On June 29, 1957, NASCAR held another Convertible Division event at Soldier Field, with Glen Wood winning the 100-lap race over Possum Jones. This was the final NASCAR event held at Soldier Field.

Summary of NASCAR Convertible Division races at Soldier Field
Date	Winner	Laps	Distance	Attendance	Duration	Average speed	Margin-of-victory
June 30, 1956 (Soldier Field 100)	Tom Pistone	200	100 miles	38,000	1:34:46	63.316 mph	3 car-lengths
September 9, 1956 (Chicagoland 500)	Curtis Turner	500	250 miles	17,585–20,000	3:36:24	69.316 mph	1 lap+
June 29, 1957	Glen Wood	100	50 miles				

==== NASCAR Cup Series ====
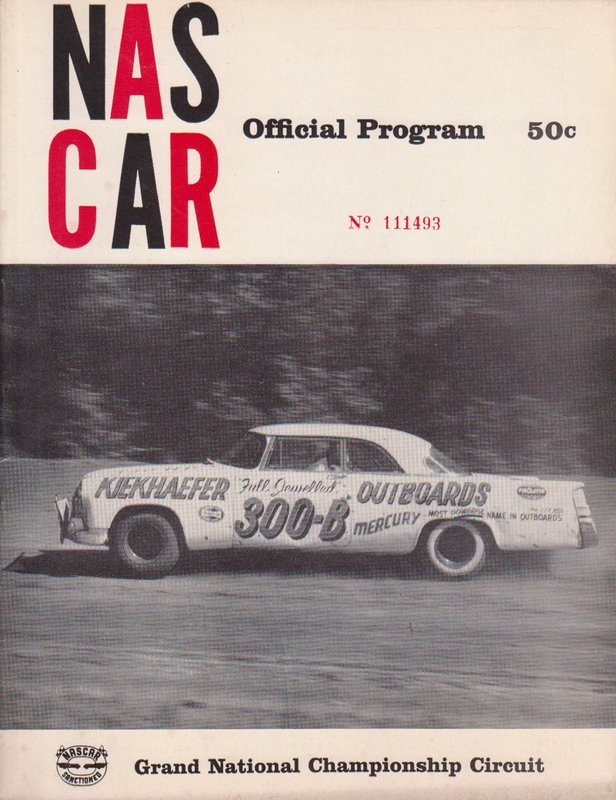
Cover of the program for the 1956 NASCAR Cup race

On July 21, 1956, Fireball Roberts won what is today regarded to have been the only NASCAR Grand National Series (today's NASCAR Cup Series) race held at the stadium's short track. Roberts beat Jim Paschal, but only by one car-length. Roberts passed Paschal only in the 194th lap out of 200 laps total. The order that drivers came in following Roberts then Paschal was Ralph Moody, Speedy Thompson, Frank Mundy, Buck Baker, Bill Champion, Paul Goldsmith, Joy Fair, Lee Petty, Bob Esposito, Frank Edwards, Bill Massey, Chuck Mesler, Al Watkins, Sal Tovella, Billy Myers, Herb Thomas, Darvin Randahl, Fred Lorenzen, Bob Chauncey, Tom Pistone, Bill Vesler, Kenny Paulsen, Ray Crowley. This was the first NASCAR Cup race to be held in Chicago. The race was the 33rd event of the 1956 NASCAR Grand National Series schedule, and was contested by twenty-five drivers. While this was not a particularly large field, some of the season's largest stars were among the competitors. Ten cars failed to finish, with many of these being sidelined due to brake issues. The race used the stadium's half-mile track configuration. At 200 laps, the race's length was 100 miles. Attendance at the race was 14,402.

On June 15, 1957, Soldier Field's annual Chicago Park District Police Benevolent Association Gold Trophy Race was sanctioned by NASCAR as a 50-lap short track race under that banner. While it considered to be a Grand National event at the time it was held, in the 2010s the race did not appear on NASCAR's retrospective lists of Grand National events that were held in the 1957 NASCAR Grand National Series. The race was won by Bill Brown.

Summary of NASCAR Cup Series race
Date	Winner	Laps	Length	Attendance	Duration	Average speed	Margin-of-victory
July 21, 1956	Fireball Roberts	200	100 miles	14,402	1:38:18	61.037 mph	1 car-length

==== Other NASCAR races ====
At the time it was held, the June 2, 1956 Chicago Park District Police Benevolent Association Gold Trophy Race was sanctioned by NASCAR as a race in the NASCAR Short Track Division. In 1956, Soldier Field hosted NASCAR Hobby Division races, including the September 1, 1956, NASCAR Hobby Division Championship.

=== USAC Stock Car ===
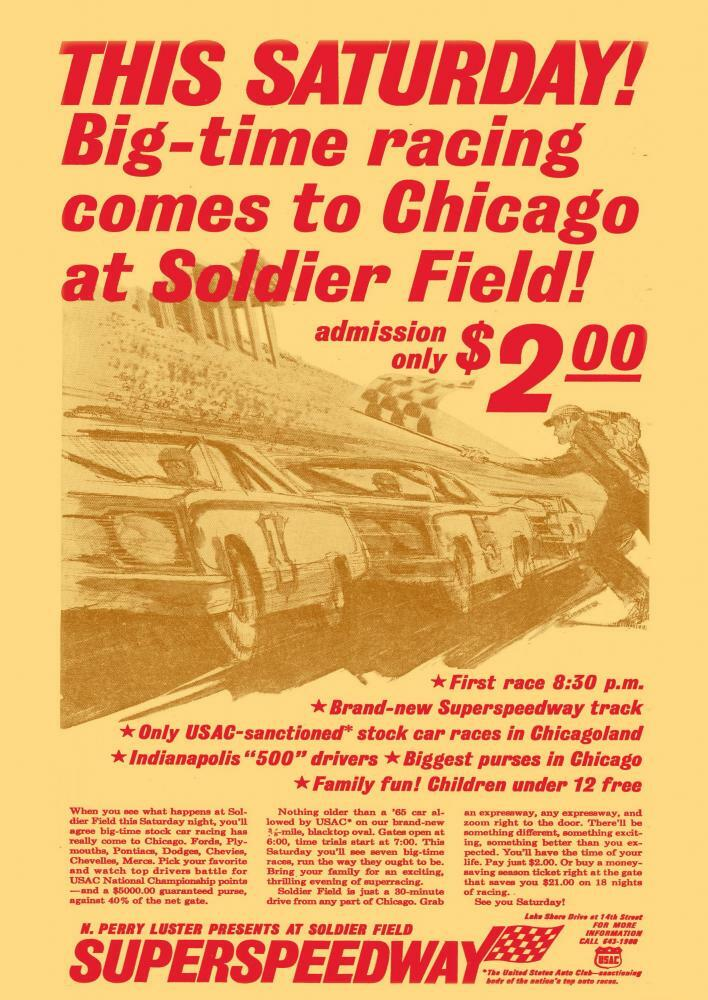
1967 advertisement for USAC Stock Car Series racing at Soldier Field

The USAC Stock Car sanctioned eight short-track stock car events at the stadium in 1967. Prior to this, a single USAC Stock Car Series race had been held at Soldier Field in 1961.

Summary of USAC Stock Car Series races at Soldier Field
Date	Winner	Laps	Length	Duration	Attendance
June 17, 1961	Les Snow	30	7.5 miles	12:22.28	11,225
June 3, 1967	Don White	30			
June 17, 1967	Don White				
June 22, 1967	Jack Bowsher				
July 8, 1967	Norm Nelson				
July 13, 1967	Norm Nelson				
July 15, 1967	Don White				
August 5, 1967	Don White				
August 12, 1967	Norm Nelson				

=== IMCA Stock Car ===
In 1967, the International Motor Contest Association held two IMCA Stock Car races at Soldier Field.

Summary of IMCA Stock Car races at Soldier Field
Date	Winner	Laps
June 24, 1967	Ramo Stott	75
July 29, 1967	Ramo Stott	100

=== SAFE Circuit of Champions All Stars ===
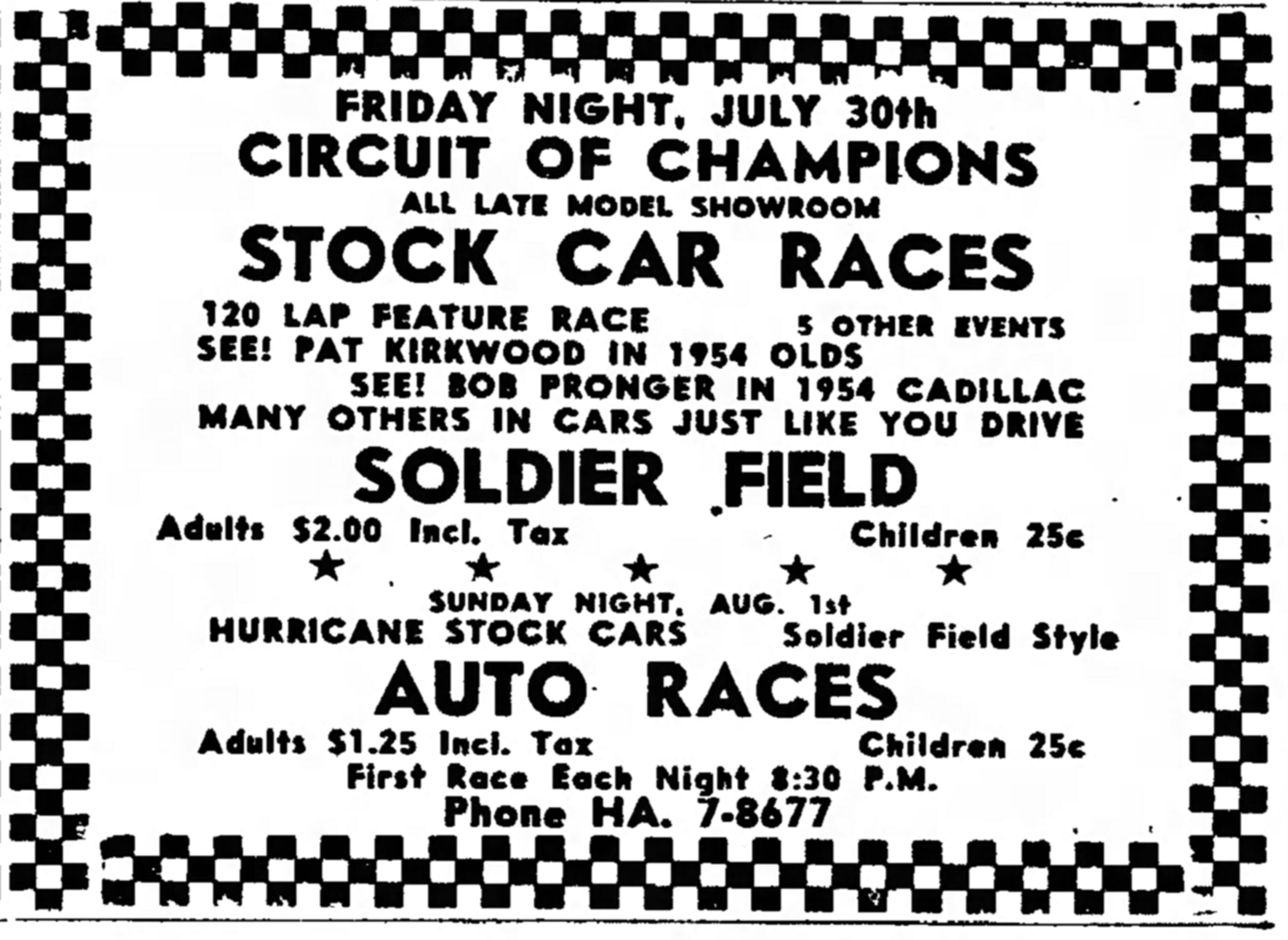
July 1954 newspaper advertisement for automobile races at Soldier Field, mentioning the July 30 SAFE Circuit of Champions All Stars race

The SAFE Circuit of Champions All Stars, the predecessor to the NASCAR Convertible division, held stock convertible races at Soldier Field in 1953 and 1954.

On July 30, 1954 Soldier Field hosted the Circuit of Champions National Championship for late model stock cars. The primary event was a 120-lap race, which was won Bob Pronger won the 120-lap race before a crowd of 11,586. With a time of 41:15.06, Pronger beat-out Bill Cornwall, and Mason Bright.

In 1955, a 100-lap Circuit of Champions All Stars race was scheduled to be held at Soldier Field, but was twice prevented from starting due to rain, first on July 23 and then on August 6.

Summary of SAFE Circuit of Champions All Stars races at Soldier Field
Date	Winner	Attendance	Laps	Winner's time
September 27, 1953	Don Oldenberg		100	
June 10, 1954	Pat Kirkwood	14,878	100	35:03.16
July 30, 1954	Bob Pronger	11,586	120	41:15.06
August 29, 1954	Mason Bright		150	

=== MARC Racing Series ===
On July 18, 1958, a 100-lap MARC Racing Series race held at Soldier Field was won by Fred Lorenzen. MARC Racing Series is today known as the "ARCA Menards Series".

=== UARA ===
On June 2, 1968, George Kladis and Bill Kollman won 20-lap United Auto Racing Association feature races at Soldier Field.

=== Annual Soldier Field Powder Puff Race ===
By the 1960s, promoter Bill Schade had begun annually hosting an annual "Powder Puff" race in which all competitors were women. Many of the women who competed tended to be the wives of stock car racers.

== Chicago Park District Police Benevolent Association Gold Trophy Race ==
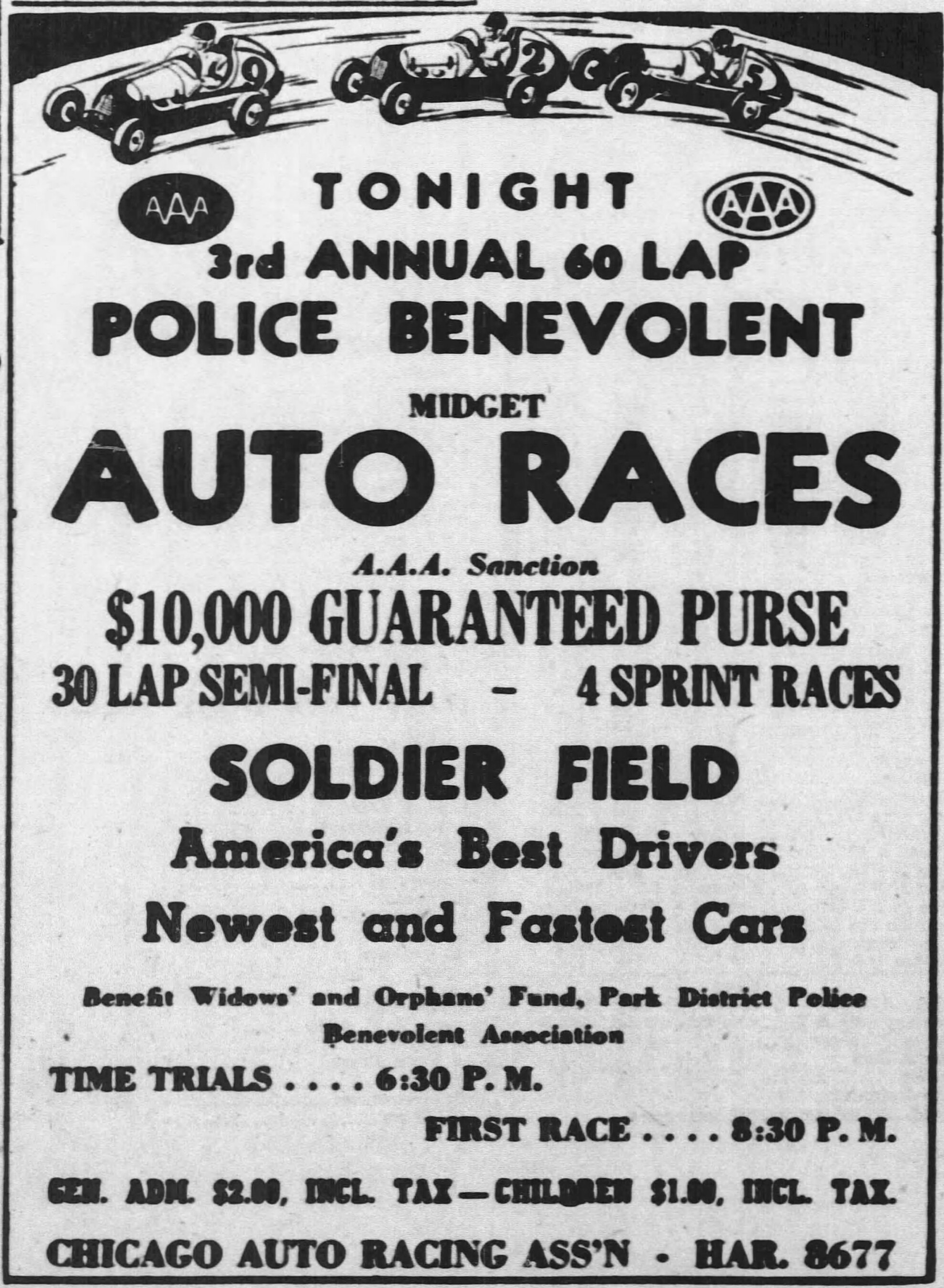
Newspaper advertisement for the 1948 race

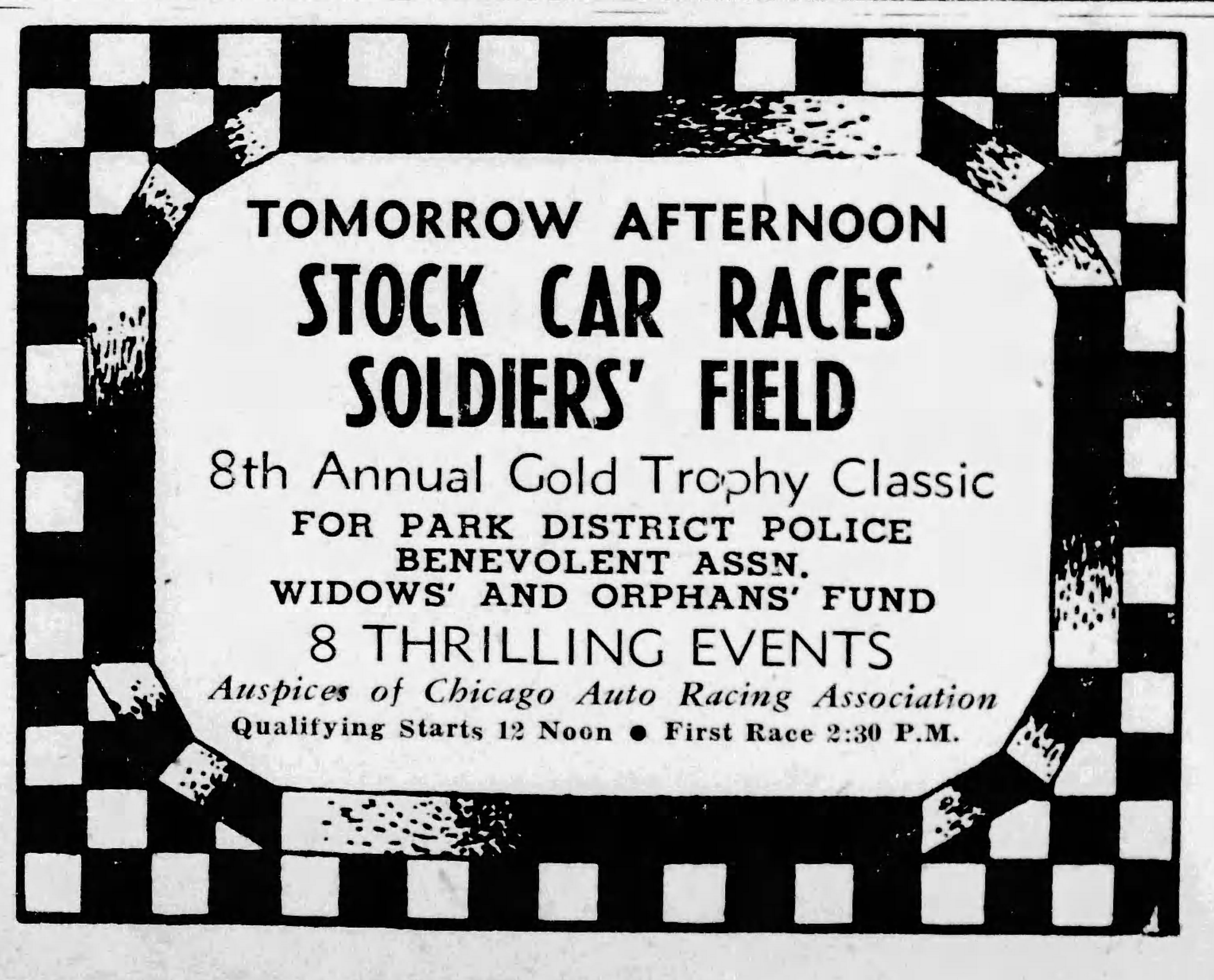
Newspaper advertisement for the 1953 race

Two unused tickets printed for the 1953 race

From 1946 through 1958, Soldier Field annually hosted the Chicago Park District Police Benevolent Association Gold Trophy Race. The event regularly attracted large crowds, and was often the year's best-attended race at the stadium. The event regularly saw political, television, and radio personalities of Chicago present the trophies, such as Mayor Richard J. Daley in 1955. Its proceeds benefited the widows and orphans of deceased park policemen and a general insurance fund for all park policemen. The event was organized by the Chicago Auto Racing Association.

More than 30,000 tickets were sold to the 1954 race.

The early editions of the race were held using midget race cars. Later editions used stock cars.

Chicago Park District Police Benevolent Association Gold Trophy Race
Year	Winner	Attendance	Type of vehicles	Number of laps	Winner's time	Notes
1946	Ted Duncan		Midget			
1947	Frank Buraney	32,552	Midget	50	14:16.18	Set new 50-lap record for track
1948			Midget	60		
1949			Midget	75		
1950	Potsy Goacher	35,223	Midget	100	29:03.63	
1950	Bill Moore	35,223	Stock car	25	9:17.02	
1951	Tom Pistone	43,722	Stock car			
1952	Gilbert “Skippy” Michaels	47,853	Stock car	25		
1953	Gene Marmor	38,079	Stock car	25	8:39.42	
1954	Larry Odo	50,000+	Stock car			
1955	Gene Marmor	60,000	Stock car			
1956	Darel Dieringer	45,000	Stock car	35		Sanctioned by NASCAR under "Short Track Division" banner
1957	Tom Pistone		Stock car	50		Sanctioned by NASCAR under "Grand National Series" banner
1958	Don Oldenberg	50,000+	Stock car			

== Other races ==
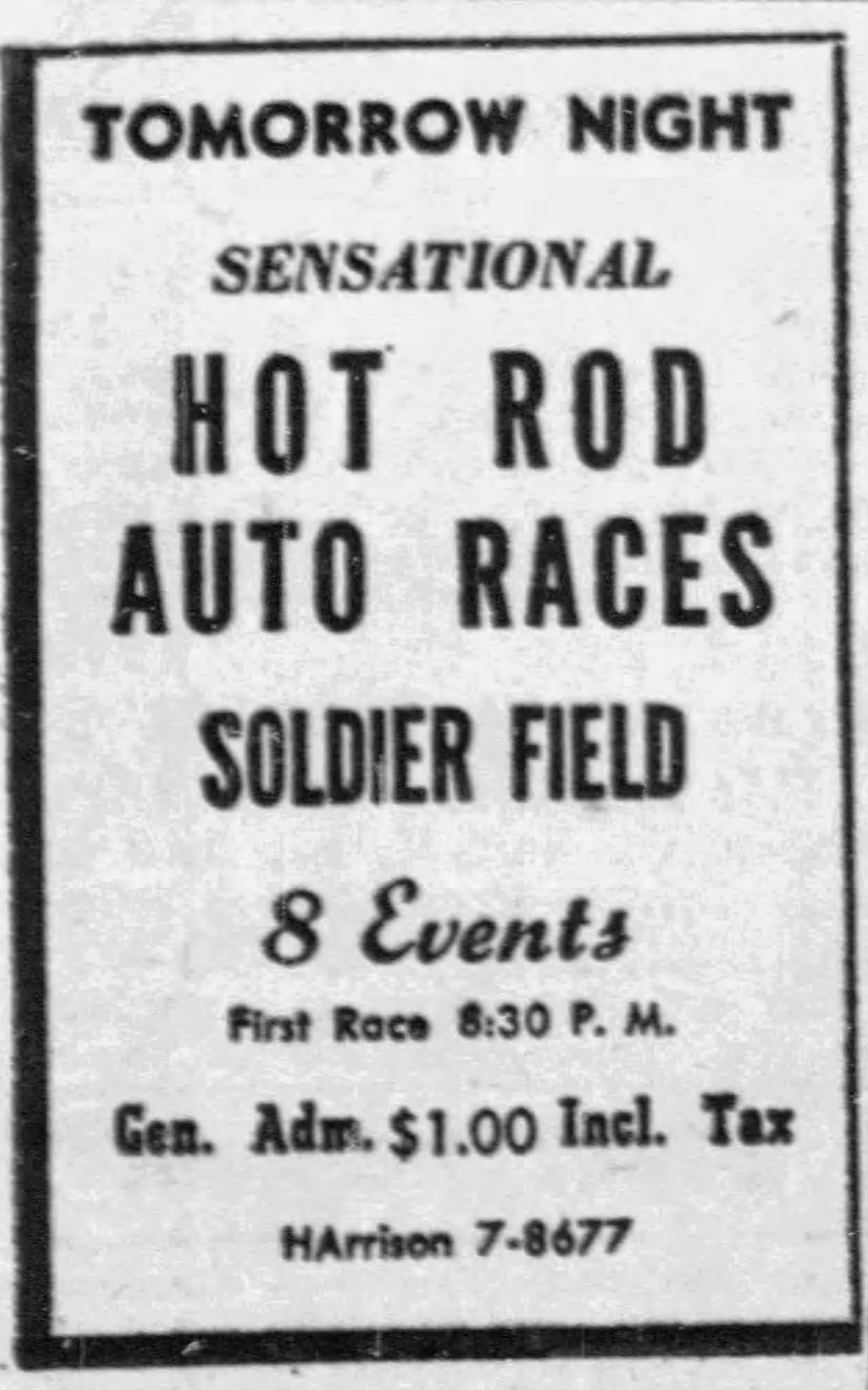
July 2, 1949 advertisement for hot rod racing at Soldier Field

In July 1947, 25,000 spectators attended the first hot rod event at Soldier Field. In August 1947, 24,000 attended a day of hot rod races at the stadium sponsored by Granatelli. 1947 races featured members of the Hurricane Hot Rod Association. Hot rod races did not attain lasting prominence at the track, quickly being eclipsed by the popularity of stock car races at the venue. Pat Flaherty won the hot rod division of Soldier Field's 1949 racing championship. Despite being eclipsed by stock car racing, Hot Rods would still race at the stadium for several years. On July 25, 1954, Soldier Field hosted the Hurricane Hot Rod Association Mid-Season Championship.

Following World War II, the stadium held many open-wheel races. The stadium also held "tag racing" events and demolition derbies.

The International Motorcycle Association held a month of motorcycle races at Soldier Field beginning July 4, 1934. Further motorcycle races would be held at the stadium over the years as parts of police sport meets and during stunt shows.

In 1953, Joie Chitwood brought his "Tournament of Thrills" racing event to the stadium, which included both races and motorsport stunts. A 1964 event at the stadium, which also featured races and stunts, was similarly titled the "Tournament of Thrills".

In the 2000s, the stadium's parking lot was used for several drifting races. In both 2005 and 2006 Soldier Field's parking lot was used for Formula DRIFT races. In 2009, the parking lot was used for a D1GP race.

== Other motorsport ==
During the 1964 "Tournament of Thrills", motorcycle stunts were performed at the stadium.

Soldier Field also hosted tractor pulling events. In the early-to-mid 1980s, the US Hot Rod Association hosted truck and tractor sled pulls and monster truck exhibitions at the stadium. The engines on some of the vehicles would echo through the skyscrapers in downtown Chicago as they made their pull. Damage to the stadium turf on a few of the event occasion's led USHRA to move these events to the Rosemont Horizon (known today as Allstate Arena).

== Other motorsport-related events ==
On June 8, 2019, the grounds surrounding Soldier Field hosted the Emirates F1 Chicago Festival, an event promoting the Formula 1 racing series and including a demonstration of a Formula 1 vehicle on a street adjacent to the stadium.

== See also ==
- List of events at Soldier Field
- List of NASCAR tracks
- Motorsport in Illinois
