= Tom Pistone =

American racing driver (born 1929)

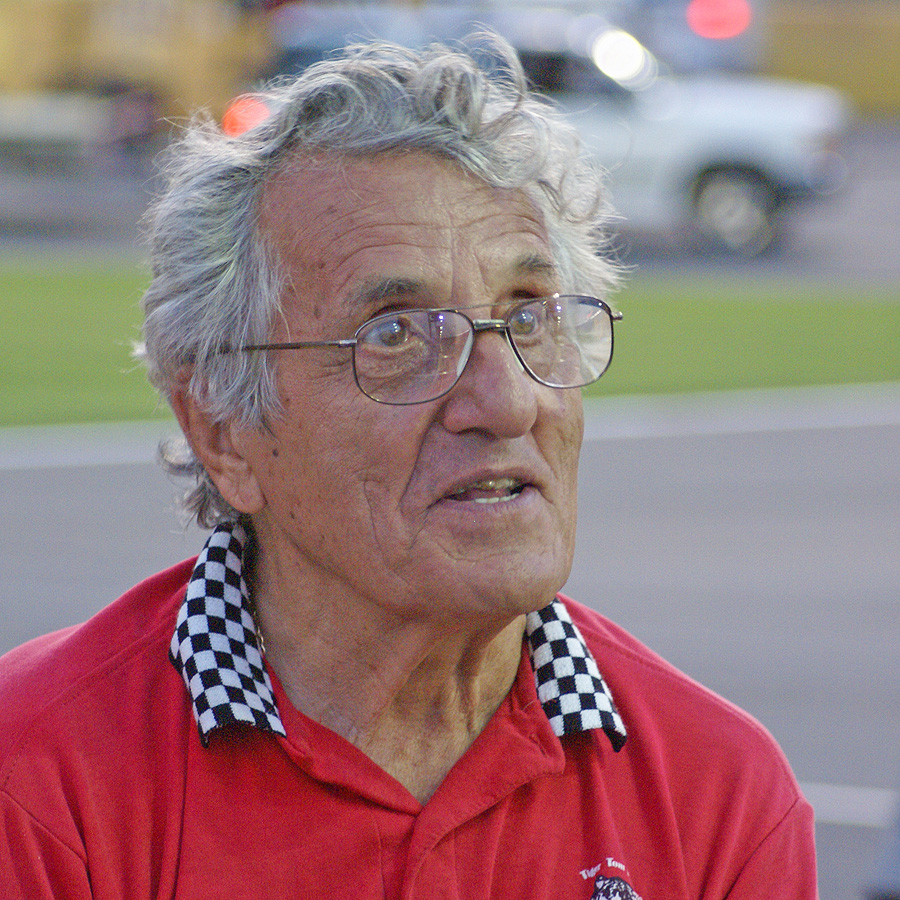
- Pistone at Charlotte Motor Speedway in 2009
- Born: March 17, 1929 (age 97); Chicago, Illinois, U.S.

NASCAR Cup Series career
- 130 races run over 11 years
- Best finish: 6th (1959)
- First race: 1955 Wilkes 160 (North Wilkesboro)
- Last race: 1968 Tidewater 250 (Hampton)
- First win: 1959 Northern 300 (Trenton)
- Last win: 1959 Richmond 200 (Richmond)
| Wins | Top tens | Poles |
|---|---|---|
| 2 | 53 | 5 |

NASCAR Grand National East Series career
- 1 race run over 1 year
- First race: 1972 Fun Sun 200 (Myrtle Beach)
| Wins | Top tens | Poles |
|---|---|---|
| 0 | 0 | 0 |

NASCAR Convertible Division career
- 34 races run over 3 years
- Best finish: 21st (1956)
- First race: 1956 Race 1 (Daytona Beach)
- Last race: 1959 Race 15 (Charlotte)
- First win: 1956 Race 22 (Soldier Field)
- Last win: 1959 Old Dominion 500 (Martinsville)
| Wins | Top tens | Poles |
|---|---|---|
| 2 | 16 | 1 |
- Statistics up to date as of October 27, 2013.

"Tiger" Tom Pistone (born March 17, 1929) is an American former NASCAR Grand National Series driver from Chicago. He made his Grand National debut in 1955. He won two races and finished sixth in championship points in the 1959 season for Carl Rupert, his best season statistically. He was away from NASCAR in 1963 and 1964, but returned in 1965 to drive in 33 races for Glen Sweet and Emory Gilliam, a career high, but only eight top-tens and a 32nd-place points finish came of it. His 130th and final Grand National race came in 1968. He won two NASCAR Convertible Division races.

In 1960, Pistone wore a life preserver and an oxygen tube in his car while racing at Daytona for fear of running into the lake in the middle of the speedway and drowning. This happened after Tommy Irwin ran into the lake in the first qualifying race. Irwin did not drown, however.

On October 17, 2010, Pistone was one of the year's 15 inductees to the Racers' Reunion Hall of Fame, located at Memory Lane Museum in Mooresville, North Carolina.

In April 2011, Pistone appeared on an episode of The History Channel's American Pickers in which he sold items to be placed in the NASCAR Hall of Fame.

His grandson Chase Pistone raced in the Camping World Truck Series.
