= Illiana Motor Speedway =

Race track in Schererville, Indiana, US (1947–2016)

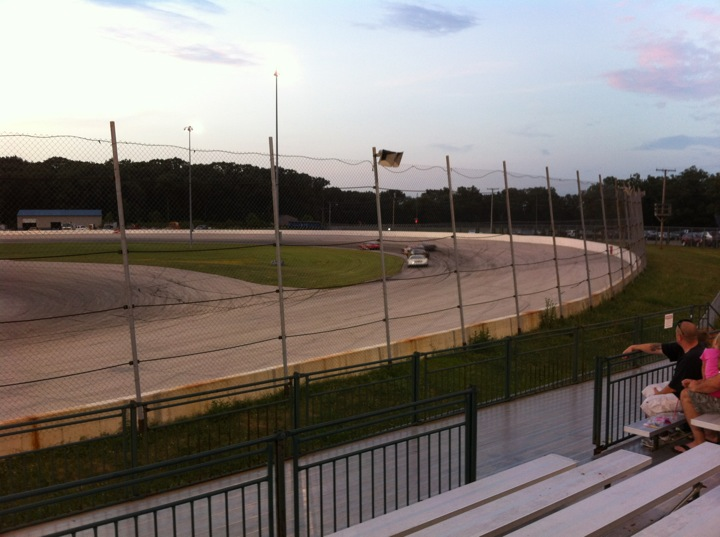
- Illiana Motor Speedway in 2012
- Location: 7211 U.S. 30; Schererville, Indiana 46307
- Coordinates: 41.476882°N 87.42332°W
- Capacity: 7,000
- Operator: Mike Mikuly
- Opened: 1947
- Closed: 2016
- Architect: Harry Molenaar
- Major events: ASA Late Model Series; ASA Member Tracks; Tony Bettenhausen Memorial 100; ASA Midwest Tour; Elmer Musgrave Memorial 100; HOSS

Oval
- Surface: Asphalt
- Length: 0.500 mi (.805 km)
- Turns: 4
- Banking: Straights: 8° Turns 14°
- Race lap record: 15.994 (Brian Gerster, Gerster Racing, 2007, HOSS)

Oval
- Surface: Asphalt
- Length: 0.250 mi (.402 km)
- Turns: 4

Figure Eight
- Surface: Asphalt

The Illiana Motor Speedway is a closed race track located in Schererville, Indiana, United States and was built in 1947. Located about 35 miles (56 km) from downtown Chicago, Illinois, United States; the Illiana Motor Speedway is the only 1/2 mile paved oval in the Chicago area. It was announced on March 11, 2016, that the track would not open for the 2016 season. The track has been sold to the town of Schererville.

== History ==
When the track opened, in 1947, it was a 1/2-mile dirt track. In 1964, the track was paved. Today the track is a 1/2-mile asphalt oval with an inner 1/4 mile. During the 1962 season the track's owner Harry Molenaar created a season-ending 100-lap race called the "Tony Bettenhausen Memorial" dedicated to the memory of former open wheel Indy car and local racer Tony Bettenhausen who died a year earlier in a racing accident. In 2000, the speedway was repaved for the first time in nearly 40 years and current owner Mike Mikuly bought the track and also installed cement walls to replace the old guard rails. In 2000, the Turbo Stox division was introduced with great success racing on Illiana's 1/4 mile. 2001 was also the last year for the Street Stock division at Illiana. For the 2003 season, track owner Mike Mikuly decided to add a Limited Late Model division to Illiana Motor Speedway's racing card, bringing the track's number of racing divisions to four. The Limited Late Models run a crate (spec) engine. The crate engine is considered to be a lot cheaper to race than the engines used in the Super Late Model division. In 2004, track owner Mike Mikuly decided again to add another division to Illiana's weekly racing program; 4-cylinder Pure Stocks and would race on the tracks 1/4 mile. Illiana added the Legend cars to the weekly program in 2007. They race on the 1/4 mile. On June 24, 2016, the town of Schererville announced it had purchased the track and would begin demolition of the speedway.

== Notable drivers ==
- Bobby Wawak, 1974 Late Model champion, ran NASCAR for many years
- Larry Schuler, 1976 Late Model champion, winningest driver in the nation in 1976
- Bobby Dotter, 1981 Late Model champion, NASCAR Busch Series race winner
- Brett Sontag, 2004 ASA National Tour Rookie of the Year
