= Johnny Beauchamp =

Racecar driver (1923–1981)

- Beauchamp in 1956
- Born: March 23, 1923; Harlan, Iowa, U.S.
- Died: April 17, 1981 (aged 58); Reno, Nevada, U.S.
- Cause of death: Heart attack

NASCAR Cup Series career
- 23 races run over 5 years
- Best finish: 11th (1960)
- First race: 1953 Rapid Valley Speedway (Rapid City, South Dakota)
- Last race: 1961 Daytona 500
- First win: 1959 Lakewood Speedway (Atlanta)
- Last win: 1960 Nashville Speedway USA
Wins	Top tens	Poles
2	10	0

Johnny Beauchamp (March 23, 1923 – April 17, 1981) was an American NASCAR driver from Harlan, Iowa. He is best known for finishing second in the 1959 Daytona 500 in a photo finish after being declared the unofficial winner. In 23 starts, he had ten top-ten finishes, seven top-five finishes, and two victories.

== Racing career ==
Beauchamp began racing old model stock cars at local county fair tracks after World War II. In 1949, Beauchamp teamed up with mechanic Dale Swanson to earn several wins, racing hotrods in Iowa, Nebraska, and elsewhere. He raced unmodified old model stock cars at the Playland Park track in Council Bluffs, Iowa, finishing second in season points behind Tiny Lund. In 1951, Beauchamp won five straight features at the Playland track and was season champion. In 1954, he once again was season champion at the Playland track. He began occasionally racing late models in 1953, and, midway through the 1955 season, Beauchamp began racing in the IMCA Stock Car. At the time, the IMCA was one of the major racing associations in the midwest and a counterpart to the southeastern NASCAR racing organization. In 1956, driving a Dale Swanson-owned Chevrolet, Beauchamp won an unprecedented 38 IMCA races, while Chevrolets won approximately five races in the NASCAR racing association. He repeated as IMCA champion in 1957, winning the award for top stock car driver of the season. Also in 1957, mechanic Dale Swanson was hired by Chevrolet to help build race cars at its semi-secret shop, SEDCO, in Atlanta, for the 1957 February Daytona Beach race. Beauchamp finished second in the beach race, and was the only car on the same lap as the winner Cotton Owens.

In 1959, another excellent mechanic from Playland and IMCA competition, Roy Burdick, was offered by Holman-Moody, a well-known center of Ford racing, to buy a Thunderbird for $5500 to enter in the first Daytona 500. Burdick agreed and asked Beauchamp to drive the car. Beauchamp found himself leading the race when Fireball Roberts went out on lap 43. For the remainder of the race, Beauchamp raced near the front, usually in the top-three. On lap 149, Lee Petty, who had been too far back in the pack to be noticed, suddenly appeared driving side by side with Beauchamp. For the last 50 laps, the two continued racing close together. Beauchamp eventually crossed the finish line at about the same time as Petty. Beauchamp was declared the unofficial winner of the race, so he drove the Roy Burdick-owned car to victory lane. Petty protested the win. "I had him by two feet," Beauchamp said. "I glanced over to Lee Petty's car as I crossed the finish line and I could see his headlight slightly back of my car. It was so close I didn't know how they would call it, but I thought I won." NASCAR founder Bill France Sr. studied photographs and newsreels for three days before declaring Petty the official winner. Beauchamp competed in seven events that season; recording his first NASCAR victory at Atlanta's Lakewood Speedway where he lapped the entire field. Although he had several high finishes in 1959, his final points of the season are not listed in the record books.

Beauchamp and his owner-mechanic Roy Burdick were certain they won the first Daytona 500, and their belief had nothing to do with the photo finish. Instead, they believed Lee Petty was one or two laps behind. The Petty pit was close to the Beauchamp pit, and the Burdick crew believed Petty had made several more pit stops than Beauchamp. Petty, as Beauchamp and Burdick learned, had somewhat of a pattern of winning races when drivers and officials believed he was a lap behind: Concord 1958, Daytona 1959, Atlanta 1959, and Weaverville, 1960. Burdick and Beauchamp believed NASCAR had a lap counting (known as scoring) problem, and part of the problem was that NASCAR had the drivers' wives counting the laps.

In 1960, Beauchamp raced for Holman-Moody and Dale Swanson in eleven events. He won his second and final NASCAR race that year in a 400-mile event at Nashville Speedway USA. Beauchamp and Petty were involved in an accident at the 1961 Daytona 500 Qualifier #2. Leader Banjo Matthews lost control of his car, spinning in front of the field. Petty and Beauchamp's cars sailed out of turn four and landed outside of the racetrack. It proved to be Beauchamp's last NASCAR race; though he only suffered head and back injuries.

In 1966, Beauchamp was the track champion in Peoria, Illinois.

== Motorsports career results ==
=== NASCAR ===
(key) (Bold – Pole position awarded by qualifying time. Italics – Pole position earned by points standings or practice time. * – Most laps led. ** – All laps led.)

==== Grand National Series ====
NASCAR Grand National Series results
Year	Team	No.	Make	1	2	3	4	5	6	7	8	9	10	11	12	13	14	15	16	17	18	19	20	21	22	23	24	25	26	27	28	29	30	31	32	33	34	35	36	37	38	39	40	41	42	43	44	45	46	47	48	49	50	51	52	53	54	55	56	57	NGNC	Pts	Ref
1953			Hudson	PBS	DAB	HAR	NWS	CLT	RCH	CCS	LAN	CLB	HCY	MAR	PMS	RSP	LOU	FIF	LAN	TCS	WIL	MCF	PIF	MOR	ATL	RVS; 15	LCF; 14	DAV; 8	HBO	AWS	PAS	HCY	DAR	CCS	LAN	BLF	WIL	NWS	MAR	ATL																					50th	328	
1957	Hugh Babb	50	Chevy	WSS	CON	TIC	DAB; 2	CON	WIL	HBO	AWS	NWS	LAN	CLT	PIF	GBF	POR	CCF	RCH	MAR	POR	EUR	LIN	LCS	ASP	NWP	CLB	CPS	PIF	JAC	RSP	CLT	MAS	POR	HCY	NOR	LCS	GLN	KPC	LIN	OBS	MYB	DAR	NYF	AWS	CSF	SCF	LAN	CLB	CCF	CLT	MAR	NBR	CON	NWS	GBF					63rd	480	
1959	Roy Burdick	73	Ford	FAY	DAY; 11	DAY; 2	HBO	CON	ATL; 1**	WIL	BGS	CLB	NWS	REF; 21	HCY																																														NA	-	
1959	Beau Morgan	76	Chevy													MAR; 2	TRN	CLT	NSV	ASP	PIF	GPS																																							NA	-	
1959	Wood Brothers Racing	21	Ford																				ATL; 14	CLB	WIL	RCH	BGS	AWS	DAY	HEI	CLT	MBS	CLT	NSV	AWS	BGS	GPS	CLB	DAR	HCY	RCH	CSF	HBO																		NA	-	
1959		58	Chevy																																									MAR; 45	AWS	NWS	CON														NA	-	
1960	Holman-Moody	31	Ford	CLT	CLB	DAY	DAY; 33	DAY; DNQ	CLT; 16	NWS	PHO	CLB	MAR	HCY	WIL	BGS	GPS	AWS	DAR	PIF	HBO	RCH	HMS																																						11th	8306	
1960	Dale Swanson	73	Chevy																					CLT; 2	BGS	DAY	HEI	MAB	MBS	ATL; 33	BIR; 5	NSV; 1	AWS; 20	PIF	CLB	SBO	BGS	DAR; 8	HCY	CSF	GSP	HBO	MAR; 9	NWS	CLT; 12	RCH	ATL; 29														11th	8306	
1961	Dale Swanson	73	Chevy	CLT	JSP	DAY	DAY; 16	DAY; DNQ	PIF	AWS	HMS	ATL	GPS	HBO	BGS	MAR	NWS	CLB	HCY	RCH	MAR	DAR	CLT	CLT	RSD	ASP	CLT	PIF	BIR	GPS	BGS	NOR	HAS	STR	DAY	ATL	CLB	MBS	BRI	NSV	BGS	AWS	RCH	SBO	DAR	HCY	RCH	CSF	ATL	MAR	NWS	CLT	BRI	GPS	HBO						NA	-	

===== Daytona 500 =====
Year	Team	Manufacturer	Start	Finish
1959	Roy Burdick	Ford	21	2
1960	Holman-Moody	Ford	DNQ	
1961	Dale Swanson	Chevrolet	DNQ	
