= 1987 Budweiser 500 =

11th race of the 1987 NASCAR Winston Cup Series

Race details
- Race 11 of 29 in the 1987 NASCAR Winston Cup Series
- The 1987 Budweiser 500 program cover.
- Date: May 31, 1987
- Official name: 19th Annual Budweiser 500
- Location: Dover, Delaware, Dover Downs International Speedway
- Course: Permanent racing facility
- Course length: 1 miles (1.6 km)
- Distance: 500 laps, 500 mi (804.672 km)
- Scheduled distance: 500 laps, 500 mi (804.672 km)
- Average speed: 118.726 miles per hour (191.071 km/h)
- Attendance: 56,000

Pole position
Driver	Bill Elliott	Melling Racing
- Time: 24.818

Most laps led
Driver	Davey Allison	Ranier-Lundy Racing
- Laps: 212

Winner
No. 28	Davey Allison	Ranier-Lundy Racing

Television in the United States
- Network: ESPN
- Announcers: Larry Nuber, Jerry Punch

Radio in the United States
- Radio: Motor Racing Network

The 1987 Budweiser 500 was the 11th stock car race of the 1987 NASCAR Winston Cup Series season and the 19th iteration of the event. The race was held on Sunday, May 31, 1987, before an audience of 56,000 in Dover, Delaware at Dover Downs International Speedway, a 1-mile (1.6 km) permanent oval-shaped racetrack. The race took the scheduled 500 laps to complete.

By race's end, Ranier-Lundy Racing's Davey Allison had managed to dominate the late stages of the race, leading 216 laps to take his second career NASCAR Winston Cup Series victory and his second and final victory of the season. The victory also marked the first time a driver who had declared for NASCAR Rookie of the Year honors had won multiple races in the same season. To fill out the top three, Melling Racing's Bill Elliott and Junior Johnson & Associates' Terry Labonte finished second and third, respectively.

== Background ==
The layout of Dover Downs International Speedway, the venue where the race was held.

Dover Downs International Speedway is an oval race track in Dover, Delaware, United States that has held at least two NASCAR races since it opened in 1969. In addition to NASCAR, the track also hosted USAC and the NTT IndyCar Series. The track features one layout, a 1-mile (1.6 km) concrete oval, with 24° banking in the turns and 9° banking on the straights. The speedway is owned and operated by Dover Motorsports.

The track, nicknamed "The Monster Mile", was built in 1969 by Melvin Joseph of Melvin L. Joseph Construction Company, Inc., with an asphalt surface, but was replaced with concrete in 1995. Six years later in 2001, the track's capacity moved to 135,000 seats, making the track have the largest capacity of sports venue in the mid-Atlantic. In 2002, the name changed to Dover International Speedway from Dover Downs International Speedway after Dover Downs Gaming and Entertainment split, making Dover Motorsports. From 2007 to 2009, the speedway worked on an improvement project called "The Monster Makeover", which expanded facilities at the track and beautified the track. After the 2014 season, the track's capacity was reduced to 95,500 seats.

=== Entry list ===
- (R) denotes rookie driver.

#	Driver	Team	Make
1	Brett Bodine	Ellington Racing	Buick
3	Dale Earnhardt	Richard Childress Racing	Chevrolet
4	Rick Wilson	Morgan–McClure Motorsports	Oldsmobile
04	Charlie Rudolph	Rudolph Racing	Chevrolet
5	Geoff Bodine	Hendrick Motorsports	Chevrolet
6	D. K. Ulrich	U.S. Racing	Chevrolet
7	Alan Kulwicki	AK Racing	Ford
8	Bobby Hillin Jr.	Stavola Brothers Racing	Buick
9	Bill Elliott	Melling Racing	Ford
11	Terry Labonte	Junior Johnson & Associates	Chevrolet
12	Larry Pollard	Hamby Racing	Chevrolet
15	Ricky Rudd	Bud Moore Engineering	Ford
17	Darrell Waltrip	Hendrick Motorsports	Chevrolet
18	Dale Jarrett (R)	Freedlander Motorsports	Chevrolet
21	Kyle Petty	Wood Brothers Racing	Ford
22	Bobby Allison	Stavola Brothers Racing	Buick
26	Morgan Shepherd	King Racing	Buick
27	Rusty Wallace	Blue Max Racing	Pontiac
28	Davey Allison (R)	Ranier-Lundy Racing	Ford
30	Michael Waltrip	Bahari Racing	Chevrolet
31	Ron Shephard	Ron Shephard Racing	Chevrolet
33	Harry Gant	Mach 1 Racing	Chevrolet
35	Benny Parsons	Hendrick Motorsports	Chevrolet
37	Curtis Markham	Beahr Racing	Ford
43	Richard Petty	Petty Enterprises	Pontiac
44	Sterling Marlin	Hagan Racing	Oldsmobile
52	Jimmy Means	Jimmy Means Racing	Pontiac
55	Phil Parsons	Jackson Bros. Motorsports	Oldsmobile
58	Jerry Bowman	Jerry Bowman Racing	Ford
62	Steve Christman (R)	Winkle Motorsports	Pontiac
64	Rodney Combs	Langley Racing	Ford
67	Buddy Arrington	Arrington Racing	Ford
70	J. D. McDuffie	McDuffie Racing	Pontiac
71	Dave Marcis	Marcis Auto Racing	Chevrolet
75	Neil Bonnett	RahMoc Enterprises	Pontiac
80	Gary Fedewa	Burke Racing	Chevrolet
81	Mike Potter	Fillip Racing	Ford
85	Jimmy Horton	S&H Racing	Ford
88	Buddy Baker	Baker–Schiff Racing	Oldsmobile
90	Ken Schrader	Donlavey Racing	Ford

== Qualifying ==
Qualifying was split into two rounds. The first round was held on Saturday, May 30, at 10:00 AM EST. Each driver had one lap to set a time. During the first round, the top 20 drivers in the round were guaranteed a starting spot in the race. If a driver was not able to guarantee a spot in the first round, they had the option to scrub their time from the first round and try and run a faster lap time in a second round qualifying run, held on Saturday, at 3:00 PM EST. As with the first round, each driver had one lap to set a time. For this specific race, positions 21-40 were decided on time, and depending on who needed it, a select amount of positions were given to cars who had not otherwise qualified but were high enough in owner's points; up to two provisionals were given.

Bill Elliott, driving for Melling Racing, managed to win the pole, setting a time of 24.818 and an average speed of 145.056 miles per hour (233.445 km/h) in the first round.

No drivers failed to qualify.

=== Full qualifying results ===
Pos.	#	Driver	Team	Make	Time	Speed
1	9	Bill Elliott	Melling Racing	Ford	24.818	145.056
2	28	Davey Allison	Ranier-Lundy Racing	Ford	24.860	144.811
3	90	Ken Schrader	Donlavey Racing	Ford	25.010	143.942
4	22	Bobby Allison	Stavola Brothers Racing	Buick	25.065	143.627
5	33	Harry Gant	Mach 1 Racing	Chevrolet	25.130	143.255
6	4	Rick Wilson	Morgan–McClure Motorsports	Oldsmobile	25.185	142.942
7	5	Geoff Bodine	Hendrick Motorsports	Chevrolet	25.185	142.942
8	17	Darrell Waltrip	Hendrick Motorsports	Chevrolet	25.197	142.874
9	35	Benny Parsons	Hendrick Motorsports	Chevrolet	25.220	142.744
10	3	Dale Earnhardt	Richard Childress Racing	Chevrolet	25.224	142.721
11	15	Ricky Rudd	Bud Moore Engineering	Ford	25.250	142.574
12	75	Neil Bonnett	RahMoc Enterprises	Pontiac	25.291	142.343
13	11	Terry Labonte	Junior Johnson & Associates	Chevrolet	25.314	142.214
14	21	Kyle Petty	Wood Brothers Racing	Ford	25.315	142.208
15	26	Morgan Shepherd	King Racing	Buick	25.316	142.203
16	44	Sterling Marlin	Hagan Racing	Oldsmobile	25.325	142.152
17	7	Alan Kulwicki	AK Racing	Ford	25.372	141.889
18	1	Brett Bodine	Ellington Racing	Chevrolet	25.433	141.548
19	27	Rusty Wallace	Blue Max Racing	Pontiac	25.435	141.537
20	8	Bobby Hillin Jr.	Stavola Brothers Racing	Buick	25.435	141.537
Failed to lock in Round 1
21	30	Michael Waltrip	Bahari Racing	Chevrolet	25.486	141.254
22	88	Buddy Baker	Baker–Schiff Racing	Oldsmobile	25.499	141.182
23	18	Dale Jarrett	Freedlander Motorsports	Chevrolet	25.654	140.329
24	43	Richard Petty	Petty Enterprises	Pontiac	25.657	140.313
25	71	Dave Marcis	Marcis Auto Racing	Chevrolet	25.667	140.258
26	55	Phil Parsons	Jackson Bros. Motorsports	Oldsmobile	25.720	139.969
27	80	Gary Fedewa	Burke Racing	Chevrolet	25.731	139.909
28	67	Buddy Arrington	Arrington Racing	Ford	25.737	139.876
29	64	Rodney Combs	Langley Racing	Ford	26.092	137.973
30	58	Jerry Bowman	Jerry Bowman Racing	Ford	26.110	137.878
31	12	Larry Pollard	Hamby Racing	Chevrolet	26.115	137.852
32	85	Jimmy Horton	S&H Racing	Ford	26.248	137.153
33	37	Curtis Markham	Beahr Racing	Ford	26.317	136.794
34	6	D. K. Ulrich	U.S. Racing	Chevrolet	26.325	136.752
35	62	Steve Christman	Winkle Motorsports	Pontiac	26.398	136.374
36	81	Mike Potter	Fillip Racing	Ford	26.411	136.307
37	04	Charlie Rudolph	Rudolph Racing	Chevrolet	26.431	136.204
38	52	Jimmy Means	Jimmy Means Racing	Pontiac	26.591	135.384
39	70	J. D. McDuffie	McDuffie Racing	Pontiac	26.632	135.176
40	31	Ron Shephard	Ron Shephard Racing	Chevrolet	26.747	134.595
Official starting lineup

== Race results ==
Fin	St	#	Driver	Team	Make	Laps	Led	Status	Pts	Winnings
1	2	28	Davey Allison	Ranier-Lundy Racing	Ford	500	212	running	185	$46,600
2	1	9	Bill Elliott	Melling Racing	Ford	500	61	running	175	$35,575
3	13	11	Terry Labonte	Junior Johnson & Associates	Chevrolet	499	1	running	165	$25,575
4	10	3	Dale Earnhardt	Richard Childress Racing	Chevrolet	498	15	running	165	$20,775
5	9	35	Benny Parsons	Hendrick Motorsports	Chevrolet	498	0	running	155	$18,025
6	3	90	Ken Schrader	Donlavey Racing	Ford	498	38	running	155	$12,880
7	8	17	Darrell Waltrip	Hendrick Motorsports	Chevrolet	496	0	running	151	$7,895
8	25	71	Dave Marcis	Marcis Auto Racing	Chevrolet	496	25	running	147	$11,575
9	12	75	Neil Bonnett	RahMoc Enterprises	Pontiac	494	0	running	138	$8,465
10	16	44	Sterling Marlin	Hagan Racing	Oldsmobile	494	0	running	134	$9,280
11	22	88	Buddy Baker	Baker–Schiff Racing	Oldsmobile	492	0	running	130	$3,400
12	11	15	Ricky Rudd	Bud Moore Engineering	Ford	490	1	running	132	$11,300
13	38	52	Jimmy Means	Jimmy Means Racing	Pontiac	487	0	running	124	$6,485
14	18	1	Brett Bodine	Ellington Racing	Chevrolet	486	0	running	121	$2,400
15	17	7	Alan Kulwicki	AK Racing	Ford	485	0	crash	118	$7,275
16	31	12	Larry Pollard	Hamby Racing	Chevrolet	483	0	running	0	$5,615
17	19	27	Rusty Wallace	Blue Max Racing	Pontiac	481	0	running	112	$10,150
18	28	67	Buddy Arrington	Arrington Racing	Ford	479	0	running	109	$5,305
19	37	04	Charlie Rudolph	Rudolph Racing	Chevrolet	462	0	running	106	$2,050
20	29	64	Rodney Combs	Langley Racing	Ford	456	0	engine	103	$5,595
21	21	30	Michael Waltrip	Bahari Racing	Chevrolet	415	0	engine	100	$4,725
22	26	55	Phil Parsons	Jackson Bros. Motorsports	Oldsmobile	389	0	crash	97	$2,400
23	39	70	J. D. McDuffie	McDuffie Racing	Pontiac	373	0	engine	94	$1,850
24	14	21	Kyle Petty	Wood Brothers Racing	Ford	370	0	running	91	$8,800
25	4	22	Bobby Allison	Stavola Brothers Racing	Buick	362	147	engine	93	$10,600
26	20	8	Bobby Hillin Jr.	Stavola Brothers Racing	Buick	359	0	engine	85	$8,700
27	27	80	Gary Fedewa	Burke Racing	Chevrolet	355	0	engine	82	$1,650
28	7	5	Geoff Bodine	Hendrick Motorsports	Chevrolet	316	0	engine	79	$8,600
29	6	4	Rick Wilson	Morgan–McClure Motorsports	Oldsmobile	289	0	engine	76	$1,540
30	5	33	Harry Gant	Mach 1 Racing	Chevrolet	196	0	engine	73	$4,275
31	30	58	Jerry Bowman	Jerry Bowman Racing	Ford	161	0	electrical	70	$1,450
32	15	26	Morgan Shepherd	King Racing	Buick	135	0	crash	67	$4,155
33	36	81	Mike Potter	Fillip Racing	Ford	132	0	crash	64	$1,350
34	34	6	D. K. Ulrich	U.S. Racing	Chevrolet	91	0	crash	61	$4,035
35	23	18	Dale Jarrett	Freedlander Motorsports	Chevrolet	84	0	transmission	58	$3,200
36	24	43	Richard Petty	Petty Enterprises	Pontiac	69	0	crash	55	$3,175
37	35	62	Steve Christman	Winkle Motorsports	Pontiac	59	0	engine	52	$1,175
38	33	37	Curtis Markham	Beahr Racing	Ford	29	0	crash	0	$1,175
39	40	31	Ron Shephard	Ron Shephard Racing	Chevrolet	22	0	engine	46	$1,150
40	32	85	Jimmy Horton (Note: While Horton was able to qualify for the race, for unknown reasons, he did not start and is not classified in NASCAR's results.)	S&H Racing	Ford	0	0	did not start	0	$0
Official race results

== Standings after the race ==
Drivers' Championship standings

	Pos	Driver	Points
	1	Dale Earnhardt	1,823
	2	Bill Elliott	1,614 (-209)
1	3	Terry Labonte	1,568 (-255)
1	4	Neil Bonnett	1,556 (–267)
2	5	Rusty Wallace	1,467 (–356)
	6	Kyle Petty	1,465 (–358)
1	7	Darrell Waltrip	1,458 (–365)
3	8	Richard Petty	1,435 (–388)
	9	Ken Schrader	1,406 (–417)
	10	Ricky Rudd	1,378 (–445)
Official driver's standings

- Note: Only the first 10 positions are included for the driver standings.

== Notes ==
Previous race: 1987 Coca-Cola 600	NASCAR Winston Cup Series; 1987 season	Next race: 1987 Miller High Life 500
