= 1987 Miller High Life 500 =

12th race of the 1987 NASCAR Winston Cup Series

Race details
- Race 12 of 29 in the 1987 NASCAR Winston Cup Series
- The 1987 Miller High Life 500 program cover, featuring Dale Earnhardt.
- Date: June 14, 1987
- Official name: 6th Annual Miller High Life 500
- Location: Long Pond, Pennsylvania, Pocono Raceway
- Course: Permanent racing facility
- Course length: 4.0 km (2.5 miles)
- Distance: 200 laps, 500 mi (804.672 km)
- Scheduled distance: 200 laps, 500 mi (804.672 km)
- Average speed: 122.166 miles per hour (196.607 km/h)
- Attendance: 90,000

Pole position
| Driver | Terry Labonte | Junior Johnson & Associates |
- Time: 57.877

Most laps led
| Driver | Tim Richmond | Hendrick Motorsports |
- Laps: 82

Winner
| No. 25 | Tim Richmond | Hendrick Motorsports |

Television in the United States
- Network: SETN
- Announcers: Eli Gold, Jerry Punch

Radio in the United States
- Radio: Motor Racing Network

The 1987 Miller High Life 500 was the 12th stock car race of the 1987 NASCAR Winston Cup Series season and the sixth iteration of the event. The race was held on Sunday, June 14, 1987, before an audience of 90,000 in Long Pond, Pennsylvania, at Pocono Raceway, a 2.5 miles (4.0 km) triangular permanent course. The race took the scheduled 200 laps to complete.

In his first race back after taking 11 races off due to illness, Hendrick Motorsports' Tim Richmond managed to pull away from the field on the final restart with five laps left to take his 12th career NASCAR Winston Cup Series victory and his first victory of the season. To fill out the top three, Melling Racing's Bill Elliott and Wood Brothers Racing's Kyle Petty finished second and third, respectively.

== Background ==
The layout of Pocono International Raceway, the venue where the race was held.

The race was held at Pocono International Raceway, which is a three-turn superspeedway located in Long Pond, Pennsylvania. The track hosts two annual NASCAR Sprint Cup Series races, as well as one Xfinity Series and Camping World Truck Series event. Until 2019, the track also hosted an IndyCar Series race.

Pocono International Raceway is one of a very few NASCAR tracks not owned by either Speedway Motorsports, Inc. or International Speedway Corporation. It is operated by the Igdalsky siblings Brandon, Nicholas, and sister Ashley, and cousins Joseph IV and Chase Mattioli, all of whom are third-generation members of the family-owned Mattco Inc, started by Joseph II and Rose Mattioli.

Outside of the NASCAR races, the track is used throughout the year by the Sports Car Club of America (SCCA) and motorcycle clubs as well as racing schools and an IndyCar race. The triangular oval also has three separate infield sections of racetrack – North Course, East Course and South Course. Each of these infield sections use a separate portion of the tri-oval to complete the track. During regular non-race weekends, multiple clubs can use the track by running on different infield sections. Also some of the infield sections can be run in either direction, or multiple infield sections can be put together – such as running the North Course and the South Course and using the tri-oval to connect the two.

=== Entry list ===
- (R) denotes rookie driver.

| # | Driver | Team | Make | Sponsor |
|---|---|---|---|---|
| 1 | Brett Bodine | Ellington Racing | Buick | Bull's-Eye Barbecue Sauce |
| 3 | Dale Earnhardt | Richard Childress Racing | Chevrolet | Wrangler |
| 04 | Charlie Rudolph | Rudolph Racing | Chevrolet | Sunoco |
| 5 | Geoff Bodine | Hendrick Motorsports | Chevrolet | Levi Garrett |
| 7 | Alan Kulwicki | AK Racing | Ford | Zerex |
| 8 | Bobby Hillin Jr. | Stavola Brothers Racing | Buick | Miller American |
| 08 | Trevor Boys | Andrew Scott Racing | Chevrolet | Andrew Scott Racing |
| 9 | Bill Elliott | Melling Racing | Ford | Coors |
| 11 | Terry Labonte | Junior Johnson & Associates | Chevrolet | Budweiser |
| 12 | Jim Bown | Hamby Racing | Chevrolet | Hamby Racing |
| 15 | Ricky Rudd | Bud Moore Engineering | Ford | Motorcraft Quality Parts |
| 17 | Darrell Waltrip | Hendrick Motorsports | Chevrolet | Tide |
| 18 | Dale Jarrett (R) | Freedlander Motorsports | Chevrolet | Freedlander Financial |
| 19 | Derrike Cope (R) | Stoke Racing | Chevrolet | Alugard |
| 21 | Kyle Petty | Wood Brothers Racing | Ford | Citgo |
| 22 | Bobby Allison | Stavola Brothers Racing | Buick | Miller American |
| 25 | Tim Richmond | Hendrick Motorsports | Chevrolet | Folgers |
| 26 | Morgan Shepherd | King Racing | Buick | Quaker State |
| 27 | Rusty Wallace | Blue Max Racing | Pontiac | Kodiak |
| 28 | Davey Allison (R) | Ranier-Lundy Racing | Ford | Texaco, Havoline |
| 29 | Cale Yarborough | Cale Yarborough Motorsports | Oldsmobile | Hardee's |
| 30 | Michael Waltrip | Bahari Racing | Chevrolet | Bahari Racing |
| 31 | Ron Shephard | Ron Shephard Racing | Chevrolet | L. B. S. Graphics, National Parts Peddler |
| 33 | Harry Gant | Mach 1 Racing | Chevrolet | Skoal Bandit |
| 35 | Benny Parsons | Hendrick Motorsports | Chevrolet | Folgers |
| 43 | Richard Petty | Petty Enterprises | Pontiac | STP |
| 44 | Sterling Marlin | Hagan Racing | Oldsmobile | Piedmont Airlines |
| 48 | James Hylton | Hylton Motorsports | Chevrolet | Hylton Motorsports |
| 50 | Greg Sacks | Dingman Brothers Racing | Pontiac | Valvoline |
| 52 | Jimmy Means | Jimmy Means Racing | Pontiac | Jimmy Means Racing |
| 55 | Phil Parsons | Jackson Bros. Motorsports | Oldsmobile | Copenhagen |
| 62 | Steve Christman (R) | Winkle Motorsports | Pontiac | AC Spark Plug |
| 64 | Rodney Combs | Langley Racing | Ford | Sunny King Ford |
| 65 | Tommie Crozier | Leonard Racing | Pontiac | Universal Steel |
| 67 | Buddy Arrington | Arrington Racing | Ford | Pannill Sweatshirts |
| 70 | J. D. McDuffie | McDuffie Racing | Pontiac | Rumple Furniture |
| 71 | Dave Marcis | Marcis Auto Racing | Chevrolet | Lifebuoy |
| 74 | Bobby Wawak | Wawak Racing | Chevrolet | Wawak Racing |
| 75 | Neil Bonnett | RahMoc Enterprises | Pontiac | Valvoline |
| 80 | Jimmy Horton | S&H Racing | Ford | S&H Racing |
| 81 | Mike Potter | Fillip Racing | Ford | Fillip Racing |
| 85 | Bobby Gerhart | Bobby Gerhart Racing | Chevrolet | James Chevrolet |
| 88 | Buddy Baker | Baker–Schiff Racing | Oldsmobile | Crisco |
| 90 | Ken Schrader | Donlavey Racing | Ford | Red Baron Frozen Pizza |

== Qualifying ==
Qualifying was split into two rounds. The first round was held on Saturday, June 13, at 10:00 AM EST. Each driver had one lap to set a time. During the first round, the top 20 drivers in the round were guaranteed a starting spot in the race. If a driver was not able to guarantee a spot in the first round, they had the option to scrub their time from the first round and try and run a faster lap time in a second round qualifying run, held on Saturday, at 3:00 PM EST. As with the first round, each driver had one lap to set a time. For this specific race, positions 21-40 were decided on time, and depending on who needed it, a select amount of positions were given to cars who had not otherwise qualified but were high enough in owner's points; up to two were given.

Terry Labonte, driving for Junior Johnson & Associates, managed to win the pole, setting a time of 57.877 and an average speed of 155.502 miles per hour (250.256 km/h) in the first round.

Four drivers failed to qualify.

=== Full qualifying results ===
| Pos. | # | Driver | Team | Make | Time | Speed |
|---|---|---|---|---|---|---|
| 1 | 11 | Terry Labonte | Junior Johnson & Associates | Chevrolet | 57.877 | 155.502 |
| 2 | 35 | Benny Parsons | Hendrick Motorsports | Chevrolet | 57.901 | 155.438 |
| 3 | 25 | Tim Richmond | Hendrick Motorsports | Chevrolet | 57.937 | 155.341 |
| 4 | 9 | Bill Elliott | Melling Racing | Ford | 58.115 | 154.865 |
| 5 | 5 | Geoff Bodine | Hendrick Motorsports | Chevrolet | 58.245 | 154.520 |
| 6 | 33 | Harry Gant | Mach 1 Racing | Chevrolet | 58.304 | 154.363 |
| 7 | 3 | Dale Earnhardt | Richard Childress Racing | Chevrolet | 58.317 | 154.329 |
| 8 | 29 | Cale Yarborough | Cale Yarborough Motorsports | Oldsmobile | 58.503 | 153.838 |
| 9 | 17 | Darrell Waltrip | Hendrick Motorsports | Chevrolet | 58.529 | 153.770 |
| 10 | 7 | Alan Kulwicki | AK Racing | Ford | 58.535 | 153.754 |
| 11 | 21 | Kyle Petty | Wood Brothers Racing | Ford | 58.610 | 153.557 |
| 12 | 26 | Morgan Shepherd | King Racing | Buick | 58.648 | 153.458 |
| 13 | 75 | Neil Bonnett | RahMoc Enterprises | Pontiac | 58.653 | 153.445 |
| 14 | 50 | Greg Sacks | Dingman Brothers Racing | Pontiac | 58.675 | 153.387 |
| 15 | 88 | Buddy Baker | Baker–Schiff Racing | Oldsmobile | 58.711 | 153.293 |
| 16 | 22 | Bobby Allison | Stavola Brothers Racing | Buick | 58.759 | 153.168 |
| 17 | 27 | Rusty Wallace | Blue Max Racing | Pontiac | 58.832 | 152.978 |
| 18 | 43 | Richard Petty | Petty Enterprises | Pontiac | 58.906 | 152.786 |
| 19 | 44 | Sterling Marlin | Hagan Racing | Oldsmobile | 58.955 | 152.659 |
| 20 | 55 | Phil Parsons | Jackson Bros. Motorsports | Oldsmobile | 58.976 | 152.604 |
Failed to lock in Round 1
| 21 | 90 | Ken Schrader | Donlavey Racing | Ford | 58.415 | 154.070 |
| 22 | 30 | Michael Waltrip | Bahari Racing | Chevrolet | 59.016 | 152.501 |
| 23 | 15 | Ricky Rudd | Bud Moore Engineering | Ford | 59.068 | 152.367 |
| 24 | 18 | Dale Jarrett (R) | Freedlander Motorsports | Chevrolet | 59.099 | 152.287 |
| 25 | 1 | Brett Bodine | Ellington Racing | Chevrolet | 59.307 | 151.753 |
| 26 | 28 | Davey Allison (R) | Ranier-Lundy Racing | Ford | 59.328 | 151.699 |
| 27 | 71 | Dave Marcis | Marcis Auto Racing | Chevrolet | 59.493 | 151.278 |
| 28 | 8 | Bobby Hillin Jr. | Stavola Brothers Racing | Buick | 59.609 | 150.984 |
| 29 | 08 | Trevor Boys | Andrew Scott Racing | Chevrolet | 59.774 | 150.567 |
| 30 | 64 | Rodney Combs | Langley Racing | Ford | 59.984 | 150.040 |
| 31 | 12 | Jim Bown | Hamby Racing | Chevrolet | 60.258 | 149.358 |
| 32 | 19 | Derrike Cope (R) | Stoke Racing | Chevrolet | 60.297 | 149.261 |
| 33 | 67 | Buddy Arrington | Arrington Racing | Ford | 60.322 | 149.199 |
| 34 | 80 | Jimmy Horton | S&H Racing | Ford | 60.424 | 148.947 |
| 35 | 62 | Steve Christman (R) | Winkle Motorsports | Pontiac | 60.543 | 148.655 |
| 36 | 04 | Charlie Rudolph | Rudolph Racing | Chevrolet | 60.574 | 148.579 |
| 37 | 52 | Jimmy Means | Jimmy Means Racing | Pontiac | 60.590 | 148.539 |
| 38 | 74 | Bobby Wawak | Wawak Racing | Chevrolet | 60.595 | 148.527 |
| 39 | 85 | Bobby Gerhart | Bobby Gerhart Racing | Chevrolet | 60.623 | 148.459 |
| 40 | 70 | J. D. McDuffie | McDuffie Racing | Pontiac | 60.624 | 148.456 |
Failed to qualify
| 41 | 81 | Mike Potter | Fillip Racing | Ford | 62.009 | 145.140 |
| 42 | 31 | Ron Shephard | Ron Shephard Racing | Chevrolet | 62.396 | 144.240 |
| 43 | 48 | James Hylton | Hylton Motorsports | Chevrolet | 62.771 | 143.378 |
| 44 | 65 | Tommie Crozier | Leonard Racing | Pontiac | 65.922 | 136.525 |
Official starting lineup

== Race results ==
| Fin | St | # | Driver | Team | Make | Laps | Led | Status | Pts | Winnings |
|---|---|---|---|---|---|---|---|---|---|---|
| 1 | 3 | 25 | Tim Richmond | Hendrick Motorsports | Chevrolet | 200 | 82 | running | 185 | $40,325 |
| 2 | 4 | 9 | Bill Elliott | Melling Racing | Ford | 200 | 32 | running | 175 | $30,600 |
| 3 | 11 | 21 | Kyle Petty | Wood Brothers Racing | Ford | 200 | 1 | running | 170 | $24,575 |
| 4 | 8 | 29 | Cale Yarborough | Cale Yarborough Motorsports | Oldsmobile | 200 | 0 | running | 160 | $11,505 |
| 5 | 7 | 3 | Dale Earnhardt | Richard Childress Racing | Chevrolet | 200 | 55 | running | 160 | $22,400 |
| 6 | 16 | 22 | Bobby Allison | Stavola Brothers Racing | Buick | 200 | 0 | running | 150 | $14,600 |
| 7 | 23 | 15 | Ricky Rudd | Bud Moore Engineering | Ford | 200 | 5 | running | 151 | $14,825 |
| 8 | 13 | 75 | Neil Bonnett | RahMoc Enterprises | Pontiac | 200 | 3 | running | 147 | $9,930 |
| 9 | 5 | 5 | Geoff Bodine | Hendrick Motorsports | Chevrolet | 200 | 1 | running | 138 | $11,905 |
| 10 | 15 | 88 | Buddy Baker | Baker–Schiff Racing | Oldsmobile | 200 | 1 | running | 139 | $6,460 |
| 11 | 20 | 55 | Phil Parsons | Jackson Bros. Motorsports | Oldsmobile | 200 | 0 | running | 130 | $5,215 |
| 12 | 26 | 28 | Davey Allison (R) | Ranier-Lundy Racing | Ford | 199 | 0 | running | 127 | $3,995 |
| 13 | 9 | 17 | Darrell Waltrip | Hendrick Motorsports | Chevrolet | 199 | 0 | running | 124 | $6,270 |
| 14 | 28 | 8 | Bobby Hillin Jr. | Stavola Brothers Racing | Buick | 199 | 0 | running | 121 | $10,515 |
| 15 | 19 | 44 | Sterling Marlin | Hagan Racing | Oldsmobile | 198 | 0 | running | 118 | $7,465 |
| 16 | 22 | 30 | Michael Waltrip | Bahari Racing | Chevrolet | 198 | 1 | running | 120 | $7,240 |
| 17 | 21 | 90 | Ken Schrader | Donlavey Racing | Ford | 198 | 0 | running | 112 | $9,150 |
| 18 | 29 | 08 | Trevor Boys | Andrew Scott Racing | Chevrolet | 198 | 0 | running | 109 | $2,965 |
| 19 | 37 | 52 | Jimmy Means | Jimmy Means Racing | Pontiac | 197 | 0 | running | 106 | $6,665 |
| 20 | 30 | 64 | Rodney Combs | Langley Racing | Ford | 197 | 0 | running | 103 | $6,375 |
| 21 | 34 | 80 | Jimmy Horton | S&H Racing | Ford | 196 | 0 | running | 100 | $2,595 |
| 22 | 36 | 04 | Charlie Rudolph | Rudolph Racing | Chevrolet | 196 | 0 | running | 97 | $2,490 |
| 23 | 31 | 12 | Jim Bown | Hamby Racing | Chevrolet | 194 | 0 | running | 0 | $5,800 |
| 24 | 38 | 74 | Bobby Wawak | Wawak Racing | Chevrolet | 193 | 0 | running | 91 | $2,330 |
| 25 | 33 | 67 | Buddy Arrington | Arrington Racing | Ford | 192 | 0 | running | 88 | $5,480 |
| 26 | 35 | 62 | Steve Christman (R) | Winkle Motorsports | Pontiac | 187 | 0 | running | 85 | $2,220 |
| 27 | 27 | 71 | Dave Marcis | Marcis Auto Racing | Chevrolet | 186 | 0 | running | 82 | $5,210 |
| 28 | 40 | 70 | J. D. McDuffie | McDuffie Racing | Pontiac | 174 | 0 | running | 79 | $2,110 |
| 29 | 18 | 43 | Richard Petty (Note: Petty was injured in the 1987 Budweiser 500, breaking several ribs. Joe Ruttman relieved him for the race. However, per the rules at the time, Petty is credited with the finishing position as he was in the car for at least one parade lap.) | Petty Enterprises | Pontiac | 171 | 0 | crash | 76 | $5,580 |
| 30 | 10 | 7 | Alan Kulwicki | AK Racing | Ford | 150 | 0 | oil-leak | 73 | $5,765 |
| 31 | 12 | 26 | Morgan Shepherd | King Racing | Buick | 147 | 0 | engine | 70 | $4,680 |
| 32 | 6 | 33 | Harry Gant | Mach 1 Racing | Chevrolet | 144 | 0 | engine | 67 | $3,890 |
| 33 | 2 | 35 | Benny Parsons | Hendrick Motorsports | Chevrolet | 119 | 0 | engine | 64 | $11,010 |
| 34 | 25 | 1 | Brett Bodine | Ellington Racing | Chevrolet | 110 | 0 | oil-pan | 61 | $1,755 |
| 35 | 24 | 18 | Dale Jarrett (R) | Freedlander Motorsports | Chevrolet | 103 | 0 | ignition | 58 | $3,700 |
| 36 | 14 | 50 | Greg Sacks | Dingman Brothers Racing | Pontiac | 94 | 0 | engine | 55 | $1,645 |
| 37 | 1 | 11 | Terry Labonte | Junior Johnson & Associates | Chevrolet | 85 | 19 | oil-pump | 57 | $13,915 |
| 38 | 32 | 19 | Derrike Cope (R) | Stoke Racing | Chevrolet | 63 | 0 | axle | 49 | $1,585 |
| 39 | 39 | 85 | Bobby Gerhart | Bobby Gerhart Racing | Chevrolet | 43 | 0 | ignition | 46 | $1,555 |
| 40 | 17 | 27 | Rusty Wallace | Blue Max Racing | Pontiac | 14 | 0 | engine | 43 | $9,525 |
Failed to qualify
| 41 | | 81 | Mike Potter | Fillip Racing | Ford | | | | | |
| 42 | | 31 | Ron Shephard | Ron Shephard Racing | Chevrolet | | | | | |
| 43 | | 48 | James Hylton | Hylton Motorsports | Chevrolet | | | | | |
| 44 | | 65 | Tommie Crozier | Leonard Racing | Pontiac | | | | | |
Official race results

== Standings after the race ==
Drivers' Championship standings

| | Pos | Driver | Points |
|---|---|---|---|
| | 1 | Dale Earnhardt | 1,983 |
| | 2 | Bill Elliott | 1,789 (-194) |
| 1 | 3 | Neil Bonnett | 1,703 (-280) |
| 2 | 4 | Kyle Petty | 1,635 (–348) |
| 2 | 5 | Terry Labonte | 1,625 (–358) |
| 1 | 6 | Darrell Waltrip | 1,582 (–401) |
| 3 | 7 | Ricky Rudd | 1,529 (–454) |
| 1 | 8 | Ken Schrader | 1,518 (–465) |
| 1 | 9 | Richard Petty | 1,511 (–472) |
| 5 | 10 | Rusty Wallace | 1,510 (–473) |
Official driver's standings

- Note: Only the first 10 positions are included for the driver standings.

== Notes ==
| Previous race: 1987 Budweiser 500 | NASCAR Winston Cup Series; 1987 season | Next race: 1987 Budweiser 400 |
