= J. C. Hendrix =

American stock car racing driver

- Born: September 11, 1926; Griffin, Georgia, U.S.
- Died: April 13, 1963 (aged 36)

NASCAR Cup Series career
- 6 races run over 3 years
- 1962 position: 94th
- Best finish: 52nd (1959)
- First race: 1959 Race No. 6 (Atlanta)
- Last race: 1962 Gwyn Staley 400 (North Wilkesboro)
Wins	Top tens	Poles
0	2	1

J. C. Hendrix (September 11, 1926 – April 13, 1963) was an American stock car racing driver. He competed in six NASCAR Grand National Series races from 1959 to 1961, recording two top-ten finishes.

== Racing career ==
Hendrix made his NASCAR debut at Lakewood Speedway, near his hometown of Griffin, Georgia. Driving the No. 68 Plymouth, he finished 15th after crashing. He broke into the top ten during his next race, at Columbia Speedway, where he finished ninth. Hendrix returned to Lakewood later that year, where he sat on the pole but finished thirteenth, sixteen laps down to winner Richard Petty. In 1960, W. J. Ridgeway signed Hendrix to run at the newly built Atlanta Motor Speedway. Hendrix fell out of the race with a connecting rod problem and finished 27th. Driving for Fred Clark in car number 30 for the 1961 National 400, Hendrix started 30th but worked his way up to tenth by the end of the race. Running his final race in 1961 at North Wilkesboro Speedway, Hendrix started 19th and finished 13th.

Hendrix died on April 13, 1963, in a crash at Cleveland Speedway in Tennessee.

== Motorsports career results ==
=== NASCAR ===
(key) (Bold – Pole position awarded by qualifying time. Italics – Pole position earned by points standings or practice time. * – Most laps led.)

==== Grand National Series ====
NASCAR Grand National Series results
Year	Team	No.	Make	1	2	3	4	5	6	7	8	9	10	11	12	13	14	15	16	17	18	19	20	21	22	23	24	25	26	27	28	29	30	31	32	33	34	35	36	37	38	39	40	41	42	43	44	45	46	47	48	49	50	51	52	53	NGNC	Pts
1959		68	Plymouth	FAY	DAY	DAY	HBO	CON	ATL; 15	WIL	BGS	CLB; 9	NWS	REF	HCY	MAR	TRN	CLT	NSV	ASP	PIF	GPS	ATL; 13	CLB	WIL	RCH	BGS	AWS	DAY	HEI	CLT	MBS	CLT	NSV	AWS	BGS	GPS	CLB	DAR	HCY	RCH	CSF	HBO	MAR	AWS	NWS	CON										52nd	640
1961	W. J. Ridgeway	78	Ford	CLT	JSP	DAY	DAY	DAY	PIF	AWS	HMS	ATL	GPS	HBO	BGS	MAR	NWS	CLB	HCY	RCH	MAR	DAR	CLT	CLT	RSD	ASP	CLT	PIF	BIR	GPS	BGS	NOR	HAS	STR	DAY	ATL	CLB	MBS	BRI	NSV	BGS	AWS	RCH	SBO	DAR	HCY	RCH	CSF	ATL; 27	MAR	NWS						67th	-
1961	Fred Clark	30	Chevy																																																	CLT; 10	BRI	GPS	HBO		67th	-
1962	Fred Clark	30	Chevy	CON	AWS	DAY	DAY	DAY	CON	AWS	SVH	HBO	RCH	CLB	NWS; 13	GPS	MBS	MAR	BGS	BRI	RCH	HCY	CON	DAR	PIF	CLT	ATL	BGS	AUG	RCH	SBO	DAY	CLB	ASH	GPS	AUG	SVH	MBS	BRI	CHT	NSV	HUN	AWS	STR	BGS	PIF	VAL	DAR	HCY	RCH	DTS	AUG	MAR	NWS	CLT	ATL	94th	338
