= Elmo Langley =

NASCAR driver and owner (1928-1996)

- Born: Elmo Harold Langley; August 21, 1928; Creswell, North Carolina, U.S.
- Died: November 21, 1996 (aged 68); Suzuka, Mie, Mie Prefecture, Japan
- Cause of death: Heart attack

NASCAR Cup Series career
- 535 races run over 27 years
- Best finish: 5th (1969, 1971)
- First race: 1954 Southern 500 (Darlington)
- Last race: 1981 Mason-Dixon 500 (Dover)
- First win: 1966 race #23 (Spartanburg)
- Last win: 1966 Old Dominion 150 (Manassas)
Wins	Top tens	Poles
2	193	1

NASCAR Grand National East Series career
- 23 races run over 2 years
- Best finish: 2nd (1972)
- First race: 1972 Hickory 276 (Hickory)
- Last race: 1973 Buddy Shuman 100 (Hickory)
- First win: 1972 Fun Sun 200 (Myrtle Beach)
- Last win: 1972 Fun Sun 200 (Myrtle Beach)
Wins	Top tens	Poles
1	19	2
- Statistics up to date as of October 27, 2013.

Elmo Harold Langley (August 21, 1928 – November 21, 1996) was an American NASCAR driver and owner. Langley primarily used the number 64 on his race cars during his NASCAR career.

== Racing career ==
Langley began his racing career racing modified cars in Virginia and Maryland in 1952. Langley came into NASCAR as a driver/owner in 1954. In 1966, he partnered with Henry Woodfield and created Langley-Woodfield Racing. That same year, Langley won the only two races of his long career. After the second race of the 1969 season, Langley and Woodfield split and Langley continued to run the team on his own returning to the driver/owner role.

Langley finished fifth in season points in 1969 and 1971, sixth in 1968 and 1970, seventh in 1972, eighth in 1975, and ninth in 1967 and 1973. His final full season was as a driver for Langley Racing in 1975.

Langley continued to drive in a few select races until 1981 when he hung up the helmet for good. Langley began to field his familiar No. 64 for other drivers to develop their career including Tommy Gale, Joe Millikan, Jimmy Hensley and Ken Schrader. Langley shut down his team after the 1987 season.

On April 15, 1988, Langley was named as the crew chief for Cale Yarborough and Dale Jarrett with his duties in effect after that year's First Union 400 where he attended as an observer.

Langley's very last race was the Battle of the NASCAR Legends race at Charlotte Motor Speedway in 1991. The race featured such drivers as Cale Yarborough, Junior Johnson, Pete Hamilton, and Donnie Allison. The winner was Langley, beating Yarborough to the line by about three feet on the last lap.

From April 1989 through November 1996, Langley served as the official pace car driver for all Winston Cup events. Dale Earnhardt and Rusty Wallace were well known to bump and draft his car during pace laps.

== Personal life ==
Langley was married to Nancy and had four sons; Elmo Jr., Raymond, William and Steven. He lived in Harrisburg, North Carolina.

== Death ==
On November 21, 1996, Langley was in Suzuka, Japan to drive the pace car in the NASCAR Thunder Special Suzuka exhibition race which was held on November 24 at the Suzuka Circuit. During a test drive, he began to experience chest pains. He was subsequently taken to the Suzuka General Hospital where he was pronounced dead when his heart stopped beating before arrival. NASCAR legend and TBS Superstation analyst Buddy Baker was in the pace car at the time Langley suffered his heart attack, and was one of the last people to see Langley still alive.

== Motorsports career results ==
=== NASCAR ===
(key) (Bold – Pole position awarded by qualifying time. Italics – Pole position earned by points standings or practice time. * – Most laps led.)

==== Grand National Series ====
NASCAR Grand National Series results
Year	Team	No.	Make	1	2	3	4	5	6	7	8	9	10	11	12	13	14	15	16	17	18	19	20	21	22	23	24	25	26	27	28	29	30	31	32	33	34	35	36	37	38	39	40	41	42	43	44	45	46	47	48	49	50	51	52	53	54	55	56	57	58	59	60	61	62	NGNC	Pts	Ref
1954	Langley Racing	53	Olds	PBS	DAB	JSP	ATL	OSP	OAK	NWS	HBO	CCS	LAN	WIL	MAR	SHA	RSP	CLT	GAR	CLB	LND	HCY	MCF	WGS	PIF	AWS	SFS	GRS	MOR	OAK	CLT	SAN	COR	DAR; 12	CCS	CLT	LAN; 59	MAS	MAR	NWS																										34th	864	
1955	Langley Racing	53	Olds	TCS	PBS	JSP	DAB	OSP	CLB	HBO	NWS	MGY	LAN	CLT	HCY	ASF	TUS	MAR	RCH; 8	NCF	FOR	LIN	MCF	FON	AIR	CLT	PIF	CLB	AWS								RSP; 23																													100th	-	
1955	John Dodd Sr.	171	Dodge																											MOR; 16	ALS	NYF	SAN	CLT	FOR	MAS																														100th	-	
1955	Langley Racing	76	Dodge																																			DAR; 59	MGY	LAN	RSP	GPS	MAS	CLB	MAR	LVP	NWS	HBO																		100th	-	
1956	Langley Racing	81	Chevy	HCY	CLT	WSS	PBS	ASF	DAB	PBS	WIL	ATL	NWS	LAN	RCH	CLB	CON	GPS	HCY	HBO	MAR	LIN	CLT	POR	EUR	NYF	MER	MAS	CLT	MCF	POR	AWS	RSP	PIF	CSF	CHI	CCF	MGY	OKL	ROA	OBS	SAN	NOR	PIF	MYB	POR	DAR; 19	CSH	CLT	LAN	POR	CLB	HBO	NWP	CLT	CCF	MAR	HCY	WIL							NA	0	
1957	Langley Racing	8	Chevy	WSS	CON	TIC	DAB	CON	WIL	HBO	AWS	NWS	LAN	CLT	PIF	GBF	POR	CCF	RCH	MAR	POR	EUR	LIN; 11	LCS	ASP	NWP	CLB	CPS	PIF	JAC	RSP	CLT	MAS	POR	HCY	NOR	LCS	GLN	KPC	LIN	OBS	MYB	DAR	NYF	AWS	CSF	SCF	LAN	CLB	CCF	CLT	MAR	NBR	CON	NWS	GBF										NA	0	
1958	Langley Racing	8	Chevy	FAY	DAB	CON	FAY	WIL	HBO	FAY; 24	CLB	PIF	ATL	CLT	MAR; 43	ODS; 7	OBS; 5	GPS	GBF	STR	NWS	BGS	TRN; 13	RSD	CLB	NBS	REF	LIN; 24	HCY	AWS	RSP	MCC	SLS	TOR	BUF	MCF	BEL	BRR	CLB	NSV	AWS	BGS	MBS	DAR	CLT	BIR	CSF	GAF	RCH; 8	HBO	SAS															39th	980	
1958	Ratus Walters	10	Ford																																																	MAR; 39	NWS	ATL; 23												39th	980	
1959	Ratus Walters	10	Ford	FAY	DAY; 30	DAY; 25	HBO; 17	CON; 8	ATL	WIL; 18	BGS	CLB	NWS	REF; 22	HCY	MAR														HEI; 17	CLT	MBS	CLT																																	28th	1568	
1959	Ratus Walters	110	Ford														TRN; 18	CLT	NSV	ASP	PIF	GPS	ATL	CLB	WIL	RCH	BGS	AWS																																						28th	1568	
1959	Ratus Walters	10	Buick																										DAY; 36					NSV; 3	AWS; 23	BGS	GPS	CLB	DAR; 45	HCY	RCH	CSF	HBO	MAR; 40	AWS	NWS	CON																			28th	1568	
1960	Ratus Walters	10	Buick	CLT	CLB	DAY	DAY; 32	DAY; 52	CLT	NWS	PHO	CLB	MAR; 27	HCY	WIL	BGS	GPS	AWS	DAR	PIF	HBO	RCH	HMS	CLT	BGS	DAY; 32	HEI	MAB	MBS	ATL	BIR	NSV	AWS	PIF	CLB	SBO	BGS																													54th	1534	
1960	Gerald Duke	92	Ford																																			DAR; 45	HCY	CSF	GSP																									54th	1534	
1960	Doc White	61	Ford																																							HBO; 14	MAR; 19	NWS; 23	CLT; 17	RCH; 14																				54th	1534	
1960	Happy Steigel	16	Pontiac																																												ATL; 40																			54th	1534	
1961	Doc White	61	Ford	CLT; 12															HCY; 6	RCH; 5	MAR	DAR; 31	CLT	CLT	RSD	ASP	CLT; 17	PIF	BIR	GPS	BGS	NOR	HAS	STR	DAY	ATL	CLB	MBS	BRI	NSV	BGS	AWS	RCH; 8	SBO; 12			RCH; 8	CSF																		30th	5376	
1961	Doc White	16	Pontiac		JSP; 16	DAY																																																												30th	5376	
1961	Happy Steigel	16	Pontiac				DAY; 21	DAY; 25	PIF	AWS	HMS	ATL; 17	GPS	HBO	BGS	MAR	NWS	CLB																																																30th	5376	
1961	Fred Clark	30	Chevy																																										DAR; 13	HCY																				30th	5376	
1961	J. L. Cheatham	96	Chevy																																														ATL; 28	MAR	NWS															30th	5376	
1961	J. L. Cheatham	32	Ford																																																	CLT; 24	BRI	GPS	HBO											30th	5376	
1962	Ratus Walters	77	Ford	CON	AWS	DAY	DAY; 19	DAY; 47	CON	AWS	SVH	HBO	RCH	CLB	NWS	GPS	MBS	MAR	BGS	BRI	RCH	HCY	CON																																											40th	2556	
1962	Langley Racing	64	Ford																					DAR; 24	PIF	CLT	ATL	BGS	AUG	RCH	SBO	DAY	CLB	ASH	GPS	AUG	SVH	MBS	BRI	CHT	NSV	HUN	AWS	STR	BGS	PIF	VAL			RCH; 32	DTS	AUG	MAR	NWS	CLT											40th	2556	
1962	Langley Racing	82	Ford																																													DAR; 16	HCY																	40th	2556	
1962	Ratus Walters	66	Ford																																																					ATL; 13										40th	2556	
1963	Langley Racing	64	Ford	BIR	GGS	THS	RSD	DAY	DAY	DAY	PIF	AWS	HBO; 18														ODS; 5	RCH; 15	CLT	BIR	ATL	DAY	MBS	SVH	DTS; 6	BGS; 20	ASH; 12	OBS; 17	BRR																											39th	3982	
1963	Lyle Stelter	55	Mercury											ATL; 15	HCY	BRI	AUG	RCH	GPS	SBO	BGS	MAR	NWS	CLB	THS	DAR																																								39th	3982	
1963	Bob Adams	09	Chevy																																					BRI; DNQ	GPS	NSV	CLB	AWS; 15	PIF	BGS	ONA	DAR; 18	HCY																	39th	3982	
1963	Ratus Walters	66	Ford																																															RCH; 26	MAR	DTS	NWS	THS	CLT	SBO	HBO	RSD								39th	3982	
1964	Ratus Walters	66	Ford	CON	AUG	JSP	SVH	RSD	DAY	DAY	DAY	RCH	BRI	GPS	BGS	ATL	AWS	HBO; 11	PIF	CLB	NWS	MAR	SVH	DAR																																										42nd	4400	
1964	Henry Woodfield	08	Ford																						LGY; 6	HCY; 8	SBO; 16																																							42nd	4400	
1964	John Berejoski	64	Ford																									CLT; 42	GPS	ASH	ATL	CON	NSV	CHT	BIR	VAL	PIF	DAY	ODS; 6	OBS; 7	BRR	ISP	GLN	LIN; 14	BRI	NSV	MBS	AWS	DTS	ONA	CLB	BGS	STR	DAR; 21	HCY	RCH; 16	ODS; 8	HBO	MAR; 24	SVH	NWS	CLT; 11	HAR	AUG	JAC; 18	42nd	4400	
1965	Langley Racing	64	Ford	RSD	DAY; 17	DAY	DAY; 21	PIF	AWS	RCH; 13	HBO; 4	ATL	GPS; 18	NWS; 29	MAR; 6	CLB	BRI; 30	DAR	LGY; 3	BGS; 7	HCY; 13	CLT; 35	CCF	ASH	HAR	NSV	BIR	ATL	GPS; DNQ	MBS	VAL	DAY; 21	ODS; 6	OBS; 17	ISP	GLN; 7	BRI; 33	NSV; 16	CCF	AWS; 12	SMR; 12	PIF; 3	AUG; 13	CLB	DTS	BLV; 13		DAR; 26			ODS; 6	RCH; 12	MAR; 34	NWS; 14	CLT; 27	HBO	CAR; 8	DTS; 21								25th	10982	
1965	Langley Racing	84	Ford																																												BGS; 12																			25th	10982	
1965	Emory Gilliam	00	Ford																																														HCY; 16	LIN; 16																25th	10982	
1966	Langley Racing	64	Ford	AUG; 30	RSD	DAY			CAR; 7	BRI; 4	ATL; 30	**HCY**; 6	CLB; 22	GPS; 25	BGS; 5	NWS; 21	MAR; 4	DAR; 7	LGY; 4	MGR; 8	MON; 9	RCH; 17	CLT; 25	DTS; 16	ASH; 11	PIF; 1	SMR; 4	AWS; 11	BLV; 16		DAY; 13	ODS; 1*	BRR; 5	OXF; 24	FON; 15	ISP; 5	BRI; 6	SMR; 26	NSV; 17	ATL; 30	CLB; 6	AWS; 22	BLV; 2	BGS; 15	DAR; 18	HCY; 12	RCH; 5	HBO; 6	MAR; 33	NWS; 29	CLT; 30	CAR; 19														11th	19116	
1966	Langley Racing	64	Chevy				DAY; 13	DAY; 45																																																										11th	19116	
1966	Gene Black	74	Ford																											GPS; 3																																				11th	19116	
1967	Langley Racing	64	Ford	AUG; 8	RSD	DAY; 16	DAY	DAY; 20	AWS; 8	BRI; 6	GPS; 6	BGS	ATL; 26	CLB; 8	HCY; 13	NWS; 18	MAR; 7	SVH; 4	RCH; 14	DAR; 9	BLV; 13	LGY; 4	CLT; 15					CAR; 24	GPS; 3	MGY; 5	DAY; 22	TRN; 5	OXF; 9	FDA; 23	ISP; 8	BRI; 7	SMR; 8	NSV; 31	ATL; 24	BGS; 7	CLB; 3	SVH; 2	DAR; 34	HCY; 5	RCH; 12	BLV; 15	HBO; 6	MAR; 20	NWS; 23	CLT; 30	CAR; 9	AWS; 22														9th	22286	
1967	Langley Racing	4	Ford																					ASH; 14																																										9th	22286	
1967	DeWitt Racing	4	Ford																						MGR; 3	SMR; 5	BIR																																							9th	22286	
1968	Langley Racing	64	Ford	MGR; 6	MGY; 12	RSD	DAY; 25	BRI; 9	RCH; 3	ATL; 17	HCY; 10	GPS; 10	CLB; 8	NWS; 31	MAR; 10	AUG; 12	AWS; 5	DAR; 10	BLV; 13		CLT; 18	ASH; 5	MGR; 22	SMR; 6	BIR; 6	CAR; 23		DAY; 18	ISP; 7	OXF; 24	FDA; 7	TRN; 9	BRI; 11	SMR; 6	NSV; 6	ATL; 30	CLB; 4	BGS; 5	AWS; 16	SBO; 7	LGY; 7	DAR; 12	HCY; 5	RCH; 9			MAR; 32	NWS; 10	AUG; 18		CAR; 40	JFC; 8														6th	2823	
1968	Champion Racing	10	Ford																	LGY; 8																																														6th	2823	
1968	Langley Racing	93	Ford																								GPS; 7																																							6th	2823	
1968	Seifert Racing	45	Ford																																										BLV; 17	HBO; 9																				6th	2823	
1968	Seifert Racing	47	Ford																																															CLT; 13																6th	2823	
1969	Langley Racing	64	Ford	MGR; 4	MGY; 21	RSD; 19	DAY; 14	DAY	DAY; 20	CAR; 22	AUG; 25	BRI; 8	ATL; 21	CLB; 6	HCY; 11	GPS; 4	RCH; 3	NWS; 9	MAR; 8	AWS; 19	DAR; 16	BLV; 4	LGY; 7	CLT; 10	MGR; 8	SMR; 5	MCH; 36	KPT; 6	GPS; 9	NCF; 5	DAY; 14				BLV; 23	BRI; 14	NSV; 10	SMR; 4	ATL; 28	MCH; 13	SBO; 5	BGS; 4	AWS; 4	DAR; 26	HCY; 7	RCH; 21	TAL; DNQ	CLB; 6	MAR; 9	NWS; 16	CLT; 13	SVH; 5	AUG; 5		JFC; 6	MGR; 20	TWS; 27									5th	3383	
1969	Langley Racing	84	Ford																													DOV; 5	TPN; 20	TRN; 9																																5th	3383	
1969	Champion Racing	41	Ford																																																			CAR; 22												5th	3383	
1970	Langley Racing	64	Ford	RSD; 36				RCH; 3	CAR; 9	SVH; 7		BRI; 13	TAL; 27	NWS; 8	CLB; 13		BLV; 7	LGY; 8		SMR; 17	MAR; 24			HCY; 7	KPT; 11	GPS; 6						SMR; 20			CLB; 6	ONA; 7			BGS; 8	SBO; 8		HCY; 10	RCH; 12		NCF; 18	NWS; 11		MAR; 29	MGR; 8																	6th	3154	
1970	Langley Racing	64	Mercury		DAY; 13	DAY	DAY; 28				ATL; 11					DAR; 31			CLT; 35			MCH; 11	RSD; 17				DAY; 28	AST; 7	TPN; 10	TRN; 13			NSV; 34	ATL; 13			MCH; 13	TAL; 12			DAR; 21			DOV; 19			CLT; 6			CAR; 13	LGY; 7															6th	3154	
1970	Langley Racing	45	Ford																												BRI; 8																																			6th	3154	
1971	Langley Racing	64	Mercury	RSD; 17	DAY	DAY; 7	DAY; 14	ONT; 11	RCH; 6	CAR; 9	HCY; 5	BRI; 7	ATL; 18						DAR; 10		TAL; 28	ASH; 2		CLT; 27		MCH; 22	RSD; 27	HOU; 4		DAY; 27						ATL; 40	BGS; 15		MCH; 21	TAL; 11			DAR; 34		CLT; 14	DOV; 8	CAR; 29	MGR																		5th	3356	
1971	Clyde Lynn	20	Ford											CLB; 5				MAR; 12																																																5th	3356	
1971	Clyde Lynn	20	Mercury												GPS; 10																																																			5th	3356	
1971	Langley Racing	64	Ford													SMR; 4	NWS; 15			SBO; 24			KPT; 2		DOV; 7				GPS; 4						NSV; 17			ONA; 25			CLB; 7	HCY; 2		MAR; 7					RCH; 5	NWS; 10	TWS; 41															5th	3356	
1971	Ron Ronacher	67	Ford																												BRI; 6	AST; 5		TRN; 15																																5th	3356	
1971	Ron Ronacher	67	Mercury																														ISP; 3																																	5th	3356	

==== Winston Cup Series ====
NASCAR Winston Cup Series results
Year	Team	No.	Make	1	2	3	4	5	6	7	8	9	10	11	12	13	14	15	16	17	18	19	20	21	22	23	24	25	26	27	28	29	30	31	NWCC	Pts	Ref
1972	Langley Racing	64	Ford	RSD; 8	DAY; 12	RCH; 7	ONT; 9	CAR; 9	ATL; 34	BRI; 7	DAR; 13	NWS; 24	MAR; 11	TAL; 24		DOV; 25	MCH; 29	RSD	TWS; 29	DAY; 35	BRI; 11	TRN; 11	ATL; 20	TAL; 14	MCH; 12	NSV; 5	DAR; 22	RCH; 22	DOV; 7	MAR; 9	NWS; 8	CLT; 35	CAR; 13	TWS; 24	7th	6656.25	
1972	Langley Racing	64	Mercury												CLT; 11																				7th	6656.25	
1973	Langley Racing	64	Ford	RSD; 7	DAY; DNQ	RCH; 12	CAR; 21	BRI; 12	ATL; 26	NWS; 13	DAR; 35	MAR; 11	TAL; 19	NSV; 17	CLT; 14	DOV; 17	TWS; 27	RSD; 19	MCH; 19	DAY; 16	BRI; 9	ATL; 38	TAL; 21	NSV; 21	DAR; 31	RCH; 15	DOV; 8	NWS; 14	MAR; 13	CLT; 8	CAR; 12				9th	5826.85	
1974	Langley Racing	64	Mercury	RSD; 15																															25th	433.78	
1974	Langley Racing	64	Ford		DAY; DNQ	RCH; 9	CAR; 38	BRI; 16	ATL	DAR; 38	NWS; 13	MAR; 27	TAL; 23	NSV; 12	DOV; 18	CLT	RSD	MCH	DAY	BRI; 27	NSV; 18	ATL; 16	POC; 18		MCH; 16	DAR; 20	RCH; 6	DOV; 22	NWS; 26	MAR; 7	CLT; DNQ	CAR; 25	ONT		25th	433.78	
1974	Adams Racing	56	Ford																					TAL; 20											25th	433.78	
1974	Champion Racing	10	Ford																												CLT; 33				25th	433.78	
1975	Langley Racing	64	Ford	RSD; 5	DAY	RCH; 5	CAR; 12	BRI; 17	ATL; 17	NWS; 27	DAR; 20	MAR; 11		NSV; 15	DOV; 12	CLT; 24	RSD; 12	MCH; 14	DAY; 25		POC; 24	TAL; 14	MCH; 18	DAR; 10	DOV; 24	NWS; 14	MAR; 10	CLT; 10	RCH; 7	CAR; 23	BRI; 19		ONT; 22		8th	3399	
1975	Langley Racing	64	Dodge										TAL; 14																						8th	3399	
1975	Champion Racing	10	Ford																	NSV; 10															8th	3399	
1975	Handy Racing	33	Chevy																													ATL; 15			8th	3399	
1976	Langley Racing	64	Ford	RSD	DAY	CAR	RCH; 10	BRI; 15	ATL	NWS; 15	DAR	MAR; 13	TAL	NSV; 13	DOV	CLT	RSD	MCH	DAY	NSV	POC	TAL	MCH	BRI; 25	DAR	RCH; 15	DOV	MAR	NWS	CLT	CAR	ATL	ONT		36th	824	
1977	Langley Racing	64	Ford	RSD	DAY	RCH; 20	CAR	ATL	NWS	DAR	BRI; 16	MAR	TAL							NSV; 28	POC	TAL						MAR; 16	NWS	CLT	CAR	ATL	ONT		42nd	634	
1977	Price Racing	45	Chevy											NSV; 23																					42nd	634	
1977	Junior Miller Racing	95	Chevy												DOV; 31	CLT	RSD	MCH	DAY																42nd	634	
1977	Robbins Racing	42	Dodge																				MCH; 35	BRI	DAR	RCH	DOV								42nd	634	
1978	Gray Racing	10	Chevy	RSD	DAY	RCH	CAR	ATL	BRI	DAR	NWS	MAR	TAL	DOV; 37	CLT	NSV	RSD	MCH	DAY																67th	243	
1978	Langley Racing	64	Ford																	NSV; 16	POC	TAL	MCH	BRI	DAR	RCH	DOV	MAR	NWS	CLT					67th	243	
1978	Gray Racing	19	Chevy																												CAR; 29	ATL	ONT		67th	243	
1979	Nelson Malloch Racing	05	Chevy	RSD	DAY	CAR	RCH	ATL	NWS	BRI	DAR	MAR	TAL	NSV	DOV; 28	CLT	TWS																		57th	246	
1979	Langley Racing	64	Ford															RSD; 35	MCH	DAY	NSV	POC	TAL	MCH	BRI	DAR	RCH	DOV	MAR; DNQ	CLT	NWS	CAR	ATL	ONT	57th	246	
1981	Speed Racing	66	Olds	RSD	DAY	RCH	CAR	ATL	BRI	NWS	DAR	MAR	TAL	NSV	DOV; 29	CLT	TWS	RSD	MCH	DAY	NSV	POC	TAL	MCH	BRI	DAR	RCH	DOV	MAR	NWS	CLT	CAR	ATL	RSD	96th	76	

===== Daytona 500 =====
Year	Team	Manufacturer	Start	Finish
1959	Ratus Walters	Ford	48	25
1960	Ratus Walters	Buick	55	52
1961	Happy Steigel	Pontiac	38	25
1962	Ratus Walters	Ford	39	47
1965	Langley Racing	Ford	31	21
1966	Langley Racing	Chevrolet	26	45
1967	Langley Racing	Ford	33	20
1968	Langley Racing	Ford	17	25
1969	Langley Racing	Ford	29	20
1970	Langley Racing	Mercury	25	28
1971	Langley Racing	Mercury	16	14
1972	Langley Racing	Ford	38	12
1973	Langley Racing	Ford	DNQ	
1974	Langley Racing	Ford	DNQ	
