= 1965 Greenville 200 =

Auto race held at Greenville-Pickens Speedway in 1965

Race details
- Race 10 of 55 in the 1965 NASCAR Grand National Series season
- Date: April 17, 1965
- Official name: Greenville 200
- Location: Greenville-Pickens Speedway (Greenville, South Carolina)
- Course: Dirt oval
- Course length: 0.500 miles (0.805 km)
- Distance: 200 laps, 100.000 mi (160.934 km)
- Weather: Mild with temperatures of 69.1 °F (20.6 °C); wind speeds of 15 miles per hour (24 km/h)
- Average speed: 56.899 miles per hour (91.570 km/h)

Pole position
Driver	Bud Moore	Louis Weathersbee

Most laps led
Driver	Dick Hutcherson	Holman-Moody
- Laps: 191

Winner
No. 29	Dick Hutcherson	Holman-Moody

The 1965 Greenville 200 was a NASCAR Grand National Series event that was held on April 17, 1965, at Greenville-Pickens Speedway in Greenville, South Carolina.

The transition to purpose-built racecars began in the early 1960s and occurred gradually over that decade. Changes made to the sport by the late 1960s brought an end to the "strictly stock" vehicles of the 1950s.

== Race report ==
The track used would not be paved until the 1970 Greenville 200 race (which took place on June 27, 1970). No record was ever released about the exact attendance numbers and it was the tenth race out of the fifty-five races during that year. Two hundred laps were done on a dirt oval track spanning 0.500 miles (0.805 km). The race took one hour and forty-five minutes to successfully complete with three cautions given out by NASCAR. Notable speeds were: 56.899 miles per hour (91.570 km/h) for the average and 67.695 miles per hour (108.945 km/h) for the pole position speed (accomplished by Bud Moore).

The winning vehicle was a 1965 Ford Galaxie driven by Dick Hutcherson; marking his first of 14 career wins in his NASCAR Cup Series career. Other notable drivers included: Ned Jarrett, Buddy Baker, Wendell Scott, Neil Castles, Elmo Langley, Roy Tyner, and Cale Yarborough.

A significant part of the field were individually owned vehicles with no formal sponsorship whatsoever. Both Clyde Lynn and Cale Yarborough shared a single crew member for pit lane. Many drivers would run an entire race at slow speeds back then if they had no chance of winning. Usually, they get lapped before the sixth lap of the race, and eventually withdraw from the race for some reason.

The total prize purse for this racing event was $5,040 ($50,288 when adjusted for inflation). Hutcherson received $1,000 ($9,978 when adjusted for inflation) while the bottom 13 finishers split $100 apiece ($998 when adjusted for inflation).

=== Qualifying ===
Grid	No.	Driver	Manufacturer	Owner
1	45	Bud Moore	'65 Plymouth	Louis Weathersbee
2	29	Dick Hutcherson	'65 Ford	Holman-Moody Racing
3	87	Buck Baker	'65 Oldsmobile	Buck Baker
4	55	Tiny Lund	'64 Ford	Lyle Stelter
5	76	Larry Frank	'64 Ford	Larry Frank
6	11	Ned Jarrett	'65 Ford	Bondy Long
7	35	Jeff Hawkins	'64 Dodge	Lester Hunter
8	31	Cale Yarborough	'64 Ford	Sam Fogle
9	27	Paul Lewis	'64 Ford	Paul Lewis
10	60	Doug Cooper	'64 Ford	Bob Cooper
11	2	Fred Harb	'64 Pontiac	Cliff Stewart
12	86	Buddy Baker	'64 Dodge	Buck Baker
13	49	G.C. Spencer	'64 Ford	G.C. Spencer
14	64	Elmo Langley	'64 Ford	Elmo Langley
15	34	Wendell Scott	'63 Ford	Wendell Scott
16	9	Roy Tyner	'63 Chevrolet	Roy Tyner
17	97	Henley Gray	'64 Ford	Gene Cline
18	20	Clyde Lynn	'64 Ford	Clyde Lynn
19	68	Bob Derrington	'64 Ford	Bob Derrington
20	75	J.T. Putney	'64 Ford	C.L. Crawford
21	52	E.J. Trivette	'63 Chevrolet	Jess Potter
22	25	Jabe Thomas	'64 Ford	Jabe Thomas
23	86	Neil Castles	'65 Plymouth	Buck Baker
24	80	G.T. Nolen	'64 Pontiac	Allen McMillion
25	10	Bernard Alvarez	'64 Ford	Gary Weaver

== Timeline ==
Section reference:

- Start of race: Dick Hutcherson started the race with the pole position.
- Lap 15: Tiny Lund's vehicle developed engine problems, forcing him out of the race.
- Lap 16: Cale Yarborough's engine stopped working properly, ending the day for him on the track.
- Lap 22: Axle issues forced Roy Tyner out of the race.
- Lap 28: E.J. Trivette had a problematic engine in his vehicle, forcing him to leave the race.
- Lap 29: Jeff Hawkins' engine went haywire; not allowing him to finish the race.
- Lap 30: Differential problems would prevent Elmo Langley from finishing the race.
- Lap 39: Bud Moore takes over the lead from Dick Hutcherson.
- Lap 48: Dick Hutcherson takes over the lead from Bud Moore.
- Lap 49: Problems with the vehicle's rear housing would take Buck Baker out of the race.
- Lap 53: A problem with the vehicle differential would force G.C. Spencer to leave the track.
- Lap 60: A lack of proper tires forced Bob Derrington out of the race.
- Lap 83: Larry Frank had a terminal crash; causing him to withdraw from the race.
- Lap 153: Neil Castles' driveshaft stopped working properly, he had to settle for 13th place.
- Finish: Dick Hutcherson was officially declared the winner of the event.

== Finishing order ==
Section reference:

1. Dick Hutcherson (No. 29)
2. Ned Jarrett (No. 11)
3. Buddy Baker† (No. 86)
4. Bud Moore (No. 45)
5. Fred Harb (No. 2)
6. Paul Lewis (No. 27)
7. J.T. Putney† (No. 75)
8. Henley Gray (No. 97)
9. Clyde Lynn† (No. 20)
10. Wendell Scott (No. 34)
11. G.T. Nolen (No. 80)
12. Doug Cooper† (No. 60)
13. Neil Castles* (No. 86)
14. Larry Frank*† (No. 76)
15. Bob Derrington*† (No. 68)
16. G.C. Spencer*† (No. 49)
17. Buck Baker*† (No. 87)
18. Elmo Langley*† (No. 64)
19. Jeff Hawkins* (No. 35)
20. E.J. Trivette* (No. 42)
21. Roy Tyner*† (No. 9)
22. Cale Yarborough* (No. 31)
23. Tiny Lund*† (No. 55)
24. Bernard Alvarez* (No. 10)
25. Jabe Thomas*† (No. 25)

† signifies that the driver is known to be deceased
* Driver failed to finish race

Preceded by 1965 Atlanta 500	NASCAR Grand National races 1965	Succeeded by 1965 Gwyn Staley 400
