= Roscoe Thompson =

American racecar driver (1922–1988)

- Born: July 5, 1922; Cleveland, Georgia, U.S.
- Died: April 10, 1988 (aged 65)

NASCAR Cup Series career
- 29 races run over 9 years
- Best finish: 40th-1961 NASCAR Grand National Series
- First race: 1948 race (Daytona Beach & Road Course)
- Last race: 1962 Southern 500 (Darlington Raceway)
Wins	Top tens	Poles
6	23	0

Roscoe Thompson (July 5, 1922 – April 10, 1988) was an American NASCAR Grand National Series driver who drove from 1948 (at the age of 26) to 1962 (at the age of 40).

== Career summary ==
Thompson's best season was in 1950 in what is now the NASCAR O'Reilly Auto Parts Series, where he won six of 29 races, finished in the top-five 23 times and top 10 29 times. In the Grand National Series out of 2033 laps, Thompson only managed to lead 11 (less than 1%) of them. His total career earnings were $5,440 ($57,900.99 when adjusted for inflation).

The most notable races that Thompson attended were the first running of the Southern 500, 1959 Daytona 500 (first on paved track) and the 1961 running of the World 600. Some of his earlier accomplishments are as follows:

- Thompson was inducted into the Georgia Racing Hall of Fame 10/27/06.
- Peach Bowl Champion in 1950 and 1951.
- NASCAR's sportsman champ for Georgia in 1953
- Southeastern Modified champ in 1954.
- Thompson started seventh in the 1959 Daytona 500. (First on the track).
- Thompson was tenth in NASCAR'S first points standings in 1948.
- In 1964, Thompson was inducted into the Museum of Speed in Daytona.

Thompson has traditionally used the No. 15 and No. 24 as his racing numbers. He also had relied on Oldsmobile engines for the majority of his career.
