= 1964 Pennsylvania 200 =

Auto race held at Lincoln Speedway in 1964

Race details
- Race 41 of 62 in the 1964 NASCAR Grand National Series season
- Date: July 21, 1964; 62 years ago
- Official name: Pennsylvania 200
- Location: Lincoln Speedway (New Oxford, Pennsylvania)
- Course: Permanent racing facility
- Course length: 0.500 miles (0.805 km)
- Distance: 200 laps, 100.0 mi (160.9 km)
- Weather: Hot with temperatures of 87.1 °F (30.6 °C); wind speeds of 13 miles per hour (21 km/h)
- Average speed: 82.568 miles per hour (132.880 km/h)

Pole position
Driver	David Pearson	Owens Racing

Most laps led
Driver	Bob Welborn	Holman-Moody
- Laps: 125

Winner
No. 6	David Pearson	Owens Racing

Television in the United States
- Network: untelevised
- Announcers: none

The 1964 Pennsylvania 200 was a NASCAR Grand National Series event that was held on July 21, 1964, at Lincoln Speedway in New Oxford, Pennsylvania.

== Race report ==
There were 21 drivers on the grid; all of them were American-born males. Frank Tanner received the last-place finish due to an oil pressure issue on lap 2 out of the 200 laps that made up the regulation length of the race. There were only two lead changes; David Pearson managed to defeat Richard Petty by 11 seconds in only one hour and twelve minutes. While Pearson achieved a pole position with a speed of 86.289 miles per hour (138.869 km/h), the average speed of the race was only 82.586 miles per hour (132.909 km/h).

Bob Welborn would retire from NASCAR after this race; having gone winless since the 1959 Western North Carolina 500. Wendell Scott managed to charge ahead from a disappointing 21st place to a respectable fourth place during the course of the race. There were only 2 cautions in this race; making it relatively safe even by today's standards.

Notable crew chiefs that participated in this race included Jimmy Helms, Vic Ballard, Bob Cooper, Dale Inman and Wendell Scott (who also owned the vehicle and drove it in the same race).

The transition to purpose-built racecars began in the early 1960s and occurred gradually over that decade. Changes made to the sport by the late 1960s brought an end to the "strictly stock" vehicles of the 1950s.

=== Qualifying ===
Grid	No.	Driver	Manufacturer	Owner
1	6	David Pearson	'64 Dodge	Cotton Owens
2	06	Bob Welborn	'64 Ford	Holman-Moody Racing
3	41	Richard Petty	'64 Plymouth	Petty Enterprises
4	11	Ned Jarrett	'64 Ford	Bondy Long
5	60	Doug Cooper	'63 Ford	Bob Cooper
6	54	Jimmy Pardue	'64 Plymouth	Charles Robinson
7	72	Doug Yates	'64 Plymouth	Doug Yates
8	88	Neil Castles	'62 Chrysler	Buck Baker
9	02	Curtis Crider	'63 Mercury	Curtis Crider
10	55	Earl Brooks	'63 Chevrolet	Wendell Scott
11	49	Doug Moore	'64 Chevrolet	G.C. Spencer
12	68	Bob Derrington	'63 Ford	Bob Derrington
13	03	LeeRoy Yarbrough	'64 Dodge	Ray Fox
14	31	Al White	'63 Ford	Al White
15	45	Louis Weathersbee	'63 Plymouth	Louis Weathersbee
16	10	Bernard Alvarez	'64 Ford	Bernard Alvarez
17	64	Elmo Langley	'63 Ford	John Berejoski
18	9	Roy Tyner	'64 Chevrolet	Roy Tyner
19	66	Frank Tanner	'63 Ford	Frank Tanner
20	01	Pete Boland	'63 Mercury	Curtis Crider
21	34	Wendell Scott	'63 Ford	Wendell Scott

=== Finishing order ===
Section reference:

1. David Pearson (No. 6)
2. Richard Petty (No. 41)
3. Jimmy Pardue (No. 54)
4. Wendell Scott (No. 34)
5. Doug Yates (No. 72)
6. Curtis Crider (No. 02)
7. Al White (No. 31)
8. Doug Cooper (No. 60)
9. Roy Tyner (No. 9)
10. Bob Derrington (No. 68)
11. Bob Welborn* (No. 06)
12. Earl Brooks* (No. 55)
13. Neil Castles* (No. 88)
14. Elmo Langley* (No. 64)
15. Ned Jarrett* (No. 11)
16. Louis Weathersbee* (No. 45)
17. Doug Moore* (No. 49)
18. LeeRoy Yarbrough* (No. 03)
19. Bernard Alvarez* (No. 10)
20. Pete Boland* (No. 01)
21. Frank Tanner* (No. 66)

* Driver failed to finish race

== Timeline ==
Section reference:

- Start of race: Bob Welborn started the race with the pole position.
- Lap 2: Oil pressure issues made Frank Tanner the last-place finish; Pete Boland had issues with steering his racing vehicle.
- Lap 4: Ignition problems forced Doug Moore to stop racing for the remainder of the day.
- Lap 10: Louis Weatherbee had a terminal crash, forcing him to withdraw from the event.
- Lap 32: Ned Jarrett had an issue with his engine, causing him to exit the race.
- Lap 50: Elmo Langley noticed that his brakes no longer worked, ending his day on the track.
- Lap 107: The rear end of Neil Castles' vehicle became a concern to NASCAR officials, forcing him to exit the race.
- Lap 109: Transmission issues took away Earl Brooks' chance of winning the race.
- Lap 126: David Pearson takes over the lead from Bob Welborn.
- Lap 169: Bob Welborn developed engine issues; forcing him to leave the race.
- Finish: David Pearson was officially declared the winner of the event.

Preceded by 1964 The Glen 151.8	NASCAR Grand National Series Season; 1964	Succeeded by 1964 Volunteer 500
