= 1987 Budweiser 400 =

13th race of the 1987 NASCAR Winston Cup Series

Race details
- Race 13 of 29 in the 1987 NASCAR Winston Cup Series
- The 1987 Budweiser 400 program cover.
- Date: June 21, 1987
- Official name: 19th Annual Budweiser 400
- Location: Riverside International Raceway, Riverside, California
- Course: Permanent racing facility
- Course length: 2.62 miles (4.216 km)
- Distance: 95 laps, 248.9 mi (400.565 km)
- Scheduled distance: 95 laps, 248.9 mi (400.565 km)
- Average speed: 102.183 miles per hour (164.448 km/h)
- Attendance: 55,000

Pole position
Driver	Terry Labonte	Junior Johnson & Associates
- Time: 1:20.244

Most laps led
Driver	Tim Richmond	Hendrick Motorsports
- Laps: 48

Winner
No. 25	Tim Richmond	Hendrick Motorsports

Television in the United States
- Network: ESPN
- Announcers: Larry Nuber, Dick Berggren

Radio in the United States
- Radio: Motor Racing Network

The 1987 Budweiser 400 was the 13th stock car race of the 1987 NASCAR Winston Cup Series season, the second race of the 1987 NASCAR Winston West Series, and the 19th iteration of the event. The race was held on Sunday, June 21, 1987, before an audience of 55,000 in Riverside, California, at the short layout of Riverside International Raceway, a 2.62 miles (4.22 km) permanent road course layout at the track. The race took the scheduled 95 laps to complete.

By race's end, Hendrick Motorsports' Tim Richmond managed to dominate the late stages of the race, leading the last 31 of 39 laps to take his 13th and final career NASCAR Winston Cup Series victory and his second and final victory of the season. To fill out the top three, Bud Moore Engineering's Ricky Rudd and RahMoc Enterprises' Neil Bonnett finished second and third, respectively.

== Background ==
The layout of Riverside International Raceway, the venue where the race was held.

Riverside International Raceway (sometimes known as Riverside, RIR, or Riverside Raceway) was a motorsports race track and road course established in the Edgemont area of Riverside County, California, just east of the city limits of Riverside and 50 mi (80 km) east of Los Angeles, in 1957. In 1984, the raceway became part of the newly incorporated city of Moreno Valley. Riverside was noted for its hot, dusty environment and for being somewhat of a complicated and dangerous track for drivers. It was also considered one of the finest tracks in the United States.

=== Entry list ===
- (R) denotes rookie driver.

#	Driver	Team	Make	Sponsor
1	Brett Bodine	Ellington Racing	Buick	Bull's-Eye Barbecue Sauce
2	St. James Davis	St. James Racing	Buick	St. James Racing
3	Dale Earnhardt	Richard Childress Racing	Chevrolet	Wrangler
4	Rick Wilson	Morgan–McClure Motorsports	Oldsmobile	Kodak
04	Hershel McGriff	Gary Smith Racing	Pontiac	Wershow–Ash–Lewis Auctioneers
5	Geoff Bodine	Hendrick Motorsports	Chevrolet	Levi Garrett
6	Ron Esau	U.S. Racing	Chevrolet	U.S. Racing
7	Alan Kulwicki	AK Racing	Ford	Zerex
8	Bobby Hillin Jr.	Stavola Brothers Racing	Buick	Miller American
9	Bill Elliott	Melling Racing	Ford	Coors
11	Terry Labonte	Junior Johnson & Associates	Chevrolet	Budweiser
12	Jim Bown	Hamby Racing	Chevrolet	Hamby Racing
14	Harry Goularte	Goularte Racing	Chevrolet	Goularte Racing
15	Ricky Rudd	Bud Moore Engineering	Ford	Motorcraft Quality Parts
17	Darrell Waltrip	Hendrick Motorsports	Chevrolet	Tide
18	Dale Jarrett (R)	Freedlander Motorsports	Chevrolet	Freedlander Financial
21	Kyle Petty	Wood Brothers Racing	Ford	Citgo
22	Bobby Allison	Stavola Brothers Racing	Buick	Miller American
25	Tim Richmond	Hendrick Motorsports	Chevrolet	Folgers
26	Morgan Shepherd	King Racing	Buick	Quaker State
27	Rusty Wallace	Blue Max Racing	Pontiac	Kodiak
29	George Follmer	Midgley Racing	Chevrolet	Budget Rent a Car
30	Michael Waltrip	Bahari Racing	Chevrolet	Bahari Racing
32	Ruben Garcia	Stoke Racing	Chevrolet	Suncrest Motorhomes
33	Harry Gant	Mach 1 Racing	Chevrolet	Skoal Bandit
35	Benny Parsons	Hendrick Motorsports	Chevrolet	Folgers
41	Jack Sellers	Vincent Racing	Chevrolet	Coca-Cola
43	Richard Petty	Petty Enterprises	Pontiac	STP
44	Sterling Marlin	Hagan Racing	Oldsmobile	Piedmont Airlines
51	Jim Fitzgerald	Hendrick Motorsports	Chevrolet	Levi Garrett
52	Jimmy Means	Jimmy Means Racing	Pontiac	Jimmy Means Racing
55	Phil Parsons	Jackson Bros. Motorsports	Oldsmobile	Copenhagen
62	Steve Christman (R)	Winkle Motorsports	Pontiac	AC Spark Plug
64	Rick McCray	Langley Racing	Ford	Sunny King Ford
66	John Krebs	Krebs Racing	Oldsmobile	Skoal Classic
67	Chet Fillip	Arrington Racing	Ford	Pannill Sweatshirts
70	J. D. McDuffie	McDuffie Racing	Pontiac	Rumple Furniture
71	Dave Marcis	Marcis Auto Racing	Chevrolet	Helen Rae Special
73	Bill Schmitt	Schmitt Racing	Chevrolet	Tom Bell Chevrolet
75	Neil Bonnett	RahMoc Enterprises	Pontiac	Valvoline
76	Roman Calczynski	Spears Motorsports	Buick	Spears Manufacturing
77	Ray Kelly	Ray Kelly Racing	Pontiac	Ray Kelly Racing
78	Jim Robinson	Lois Williams Racing	Oldsmobile	Hammer Security Service
79	Roy Smith	Razore Racing	Ford	Western Peterbilt
90	Ken Schrader	Donlavey Racing	Ford	Red Baron Frozen Pizza
95	Chad Little	George Jefferson Racing	Ford	Coors

== Qualifying ==
Qualifying was split into two rounds. The first round was held on Friday, June 19, at 6:30 PM EST. Each driver had one lap to set a time. During the first round, the top 20 drivers in the round were guaranteed a starting spot in the race. If a driver was not able to guarantee a spot in the first round, they had the option to scrub their time from the first round and try and run a faster lap time in a second round qualifying run, held on Saturday, June 20, at 5:00 PM EST. As with the first round, each driver had one lap to set a time. For this specific race, positions 21-40 were decided on time, and depending on who needed it, a select amount of positions were given to cars who had not otherwise qualified but were high enough in owner's points; up to two provisionals were given.

Terry Labonte, driving for Junior Johnson & Associates, managed to win the pole, setting a time of 1:20.244 and an average speed of 117.541 miles per hour (189.164 km/h) in the first round.

Five drivers failed to qualify.

=== Full qualifying results ===
Pos.	#	Driver	Team	Make	Time	Speed
1	11	Terry Labonte	Junior Johnson & Associates	Chevrolet	1:20.244	117.541
2	5	Geoff Bodine	Hendrick Motorsports	Chevrolet	1:20.343	117.397
3	17	Darrell Waltrip	Hendrick Motorsports	Chevrolet	1:20.391	117.327
4	15	Ricky Rudd	Bud Moore Engineering	Ford	1:20.587	117.041
5	25	Tim Richmond	Hendrick Motorsports	Chevrolet	1:20.671	116.919
6	26	Morgan Shepherd	King Racing	Buick	1:20.775	116.769
7	27	Rusty Wallace	Blue Max Racing	Pontiac	1:20.859	116.647
8	3	Dale Earnhardt	Richard Childress Racing	Chevrolet	1:20.968	116.490
9	9	Bill Elliott	Melling Racing	Ford	1:21.046	116.378
10	21	Kyle Petty	Wood Brothers Racing	Ford	1:21.324	115.978
11	35	Benny Parsons	Hendrick Motorsports	Chevrolet	1:21.334	115.966
12	33	Harry Gant	Mach 1 Racing	Chevrolet	1:21.414	115.852
13	22	Bobby Allison	Stavola Brothers Racing	Buick	1:21.555	115.652
14	75	Neil Bonnett	RahMoc Enterprises	Pontiac	1:21.770	115.348
15	43	Richard Petty	Petty Enterprises	Pontiac	1:22.034	114.977
16	30	Michael Waltrip	Bahari Racing	Chevrolet	1:22.038	114.971
17	79	Roy Smith	Razore Racing	Ford	1:22.107	114.874
18	04	Hershel McGriff	Gary Smith Racing	Pontiac	1:22.384	114.488
19	90	Ken Schrader	Donlavey Racing	Ford	1:22.410	114.452
20	71	Dave Marcis	Marcis Auto Racing	Chevrolet	1:22.423	114.434
Failed to lock in Round 1
21	44	Sterling Marlin	Hagan Racing	Oldsmobile	1:22.504	114.322
22	8	Bobby Hillin Jr.	Stavola Brothers Racing	Buick	1:22.505	114.320
23	55	Phil Parsons	Jackson Bros. Motorsports	Oldsmobile	1:22.623	114.157
24	64	Rick McCray	Langley Racing	Ford	1:22.689	114.066
25	7	Alan Kulwicki	AK Racing	Ford	1:22.738	113.998
26	1	Brett Bodine	Ellington Racing	Chevrolet	1:23.013	113.621
27	4	Rick Wilson	Morgan–McClure Motorsports	Oldsmobile	1:23.096	113.507
28	12	Jim Bown	Hamby Racing	Oldsmobile	1:23.320	113.202
29	95	Chad Little	George Jefferson Racing	Ford	1:23.328	113.191
30	66	John Krebs	Krebs Racing	Oldsmobile	1:23.381	113.119
31	67	Chet Fillip	Arrington Racing	Ford	1:23.442	113.037
32	52	Jimmy Means	Jimmy Means Racing	Pontiac	1:23.462	113.010
33	29	George Follmer	Midgley Racing	Chevrolet	1:23.546	112.896
34	73	Bill Schmitt	Schmitt Racing	Chevrolet	1:23.847	112.491
35	70	J. D. McDuffie	McDuffie Racing	Pontiac	1:24.154	112.080
36	14	Harry Goularte	Goularte Racing	Chevrolet	1:24.158	112.075
37	51	Jim Fitzgerald	Hendrick Motorsports	Chevrolet	1:24.168	112.062
38	78	Jim Robinson	Lois Williams Racing	Oldsmobile	1:24.220	111.992
39	6	Ron Esau	U.S. Racing	Chevrolet	1:24.319	111.861
40	32	Ruben Garcia	Stoke Racing	Chevrolet	1:24.460	111.674
41	18	Dale Jarrett (R)	Freedlander Motorsports	Chevrolet	1:24.917	111.073
Failed to qualify (results unknown)
42	2	St. James Davis	St. James Racing	Buick	-*	-*
43	41	Jack Sellers	Vincent Racing	Chevrolet	-*	-*
44	62	Steve Christman (R)	Winkle Motorsports	Pontiac	-*	-*
45	76	Roman Calczynski	Spears Motorsports	Buick	-*	-*
46	77	Ray Kelly	Ray Kelly Racing	Pontiac	-*	-*
Official first round qualifying results
Official starting lineup

== Race results ==
Fin	St	#	Driver	Team	Make	Laps	Led	Status	Pts	Winnings
1	5	25	Tim Richmond	Hendrick Motorsports	Chevrolet	95	48	running	185	$36,450
2	4	15	Ricky Rudd	Bud Moore Engineering	Ford	95	5	running	175	$28,450
3	14	75	Neil Bonnett	RahMoc Enterprises	Pontiac	95	0	running	165	$17,005
4	1	11	Terry Labonte	Junior Johnson & Associates	Chevrolet	95	28	running	165	$19,125
5	9	9	Bill Elliott	Melling Racing	Ford	95	0	running	155	$13,850
6	15	43	Richard Petty	Petty Enterprises	Pontiac	95	0	running	150	$7,795
7	8	3	Dale Earnhardt	Richard Childress Racing	Chevrolet	95	0	running	146	$13,500
8	13	22	Bobby Allison	Stavola Brothers Racing	Buick	95	0	running	142	$9,650
9	21	44	Sterling Marlin	Hagan Racing	Oldsmobile	95	0	running	138	$8,625
10	19	90	Ken Schrader	Donlavey Racing	Ford	95	0	running	134	$8,790
11	23	55	Phil Parsons	Jackson Bros. Motorsports	Oldsmobile	95	3	running	135	$2,150
12	18	04	Hershel McGriff	Gary Smith Racing	Pontiac	94	0	running	127	5,005
13	22	8	Bobby Hillin Jr.	Stavola Brothers Racing	Buick	94	0	running	124	$9,450
14	27	4	Rick Wilson	Morgan–McClure Motorsports	Oldsmobile	94	0	running	121	$1,850
15	29	95	Chad Little	George Jefferson Racing	Ford	94	0	running	118	$4,035
16	20	71	Dave Marcis	Marcis Auto Racing	Chevrolet	93	0	running	115	$6,125
17	37	51	Jim Fitzgerald	Hendrick Motorsports	Chevrolet	93	0	running	112	$1,675
18	41	18	Dale Jarrett (R)	Freedlander Motorsports	Chevrolet	93	0	running	109	$5,765
19	40	32	Ruben Garcia	Stoke Racing	Chevrolet	92	0	running	106	$2,755
20	36	14	Harry Goularte	Goularte Racing	Chevrolet	92	0	running	103	$3,095
21	31	67	Chet Fillip	Arrington Racing	Ford	91	0	running	100	$4,225
22	39	6	Ron Esau	U.S. Racing	Chevrolet	90	0	running	0	$4,165
23	32	52	Jimmy Means	Jimmy Means Racing	Pontiac	90	0	running	94	$4,080
24	10	21	Kyle Petty	Wood Brothers Racing	Ford	90	0	running	91	$8,300
25	12	33	Harry Gant	Mach 1 Racing	Chevrolet	89	0	ignition	88	$4,085
26	24	64	Rick McCray	Langley Racing	Ford	88	0	running	85	$3,200
27	2	5	Geoff Bodine	Hendrick Motorsports	Chevrolet	86	11	engine	87	$8,175
28	25	7	Alan Kulwicki	AK Racing	Ford	84	0	running	79	$4,150
29	30	66	John Krebs	Krebs Racing	Oldsmobile	80	0	engine	76	$1,125
30	3	17	Darrell Waltrip	Hendrick Motorsports	Chevrolet	77	0	running	73	$1,100
31	28	12	Jim Bown	Hamby Racing	Oldsmobile	70	0	engine	70	$3,050
32	16	30	Michael Waltrip	Bahari Racing	Chevrolet	64	0	engine	67	$3,025
33	34	73	Bill Schmitt	Schmitt Racing	Chevrolet	63	0	engine	64	$1,000
34	11	35	Benny Parsons	Hendrick Motorsports	Chevrolet	57	0	transmission	61	$10,175
35	6	26	Morgan Shepherd	King Racing	Buick	44	0	transmission	58	$2,900
36	38	78	Jim Robinson	Lois Williams Racing	Oldsmobile	39	0	engine	55	$900
37	35	70	J. D. McDuffie	McDuffie Racing	Pontiac	17	0	oil leak	52	$900
38	26	1	Brett Bodine	Ellington Racing	Chevrolet	7	0	oil pressure	49	$900
39	17	79	Roy Smith	Razore Racing	Ford	6	0	clutch	46	$900
40	33	29	George Follmer	Midgley Racing	Chevrolet	5	0	steering	43	$875
41	7	27	Rusty Wallace	Blue Max Racing	Pontiac	5	0	engine	40	$8,875
Failed to qualify (results unknown)
42		2	St. James Davis	St. James Racing	Buick					
43		41	Jack Sellers	Vincent Racing	Chevrolet					
44		62	Steve Christman (R)	Winkle Motorsports	Pontiac					
45		76	Roman Calczynski	Spears Motorsports	Buick					
46		77	Ray Kelly	Ray Kelly Racing	Pontiac					
Official race results

== Standings after the race ==
Drivers' Championship standings

	Pos	Driver	Points
	1	Dale Earnhardt	2,129
	2	Bill Elliott	1,944 (-185)
	3	Neil Bonnett	1,868 (-261)
1	4	Terry Labonte	1,790 (–339)
1	5	Kyle Petty	1,726 (–403)
1	6	Ricky Rudd	1,704 (–425)
2	7	Richard Petty	1,661 (–268)
2	8	Darrell Waltrip	1,655 (–474)
1	9	Ken Schrader	1,652 (–477)
1	10	Phil Parsons	1,581 (–548)
Official driver's standings

- Note: Only the first 10 positions are included for the driver standings.

Previous race: 1987 Miller High Life 500	NASCAR Winston Cup Series; 1987 season	Next race: 1987 Miller American 400

Previous race: 1987 AC-Delco 200	NASCAR Winston West Series; 1987 season	Next race: 1987 Budweiser 300
