= Bernard Alvarez =

Racecar driver from Florida

- Born: December 14, 1939 (age 86); Jacksonville, Florida, United States

NASCAR Cup Series career
- 9 races run over 2 years
- Best finish: 90th - 1964 NASCAR Grand National Series season
- First race: 1964 Fireball Roberts 200 (Old Bridge Stadium)
- Last race: 1965 Greenville 200 (Greenville-Pickens Speedway)
Wins	Top tens	Poles
0	0	0

Bernard Alvarez is a retired NASCAR Grand National Series race car driver whose career spanned from 1964 to 1965.

== Career ==
Alvarez's career was rather short, with no wins or top ten finishes resulting from it. However, he managed to finish an average of 25th place after starting an average of 19th. His 133.6 miles (215.0 km) of racing would earn him $1,250 ($12,770.59 when adjusted for inflation), which was considered a decent salary for the time. All of his races ended in mechanical failure and he became a driver/owner in 1964.

== Motorsports career results ==
=== NASCAR ===
(key) (Bold – Pole position awarded by qualifying time. Italics – Pole position earned by points standings or practice time. * – Most laps led.)

==== Grand National Series ====
NASCAR Grand National Series results
Year	Team	No.	Make	1	2	3	4	5	6	7	8	9	10	11	12	13	14	15	16	17	18	19	20	21	22	23	24	25	26	27	28	29	30	31	32	33	34	35	36	37	38	39	40	41	42	43	44	45	46	47	48	49	50	51	52	53	54	55	56	57	58	59	60	61	62	NGNC	Pts	Ref
1964	Bernard Alvarez	10	Ford	CON	AUG	JSP	SVH	RSD	DAY	DAY	DAY	RCH	BRI	GPS	BGS	ATL	AWS	HBO	PIF	CLB	NWS	MAR	SVH	DAR	LGY	HCY	SBO	CLT	GPS	ASH	ATL	CON	NSV	CHT	BIR	VAL	PIF	DAY	ODS	OBS; 22	BRR; 21	ISP	GLN; 19	LIN; 19	BRI	NSV	MBS	AWS; 33	DTS; 15	ONA; 26	CLB	BGS	STR	DAR	HCY	RCH	ODS	HBO	MAR	SVH	NWS	CLT	HAR	AUG	JAC	90th	686	
1965	Gary Weaver	10	Ford	RSD	DAY	DAY	DAY	PIF	ASW	RCH	HBO	ATL; 42	GPS; 24	NWS	MAR	CLB	BRI	DAR; DNQ	LGY	BGS	HCY	CLT	CCF	ASH	HAR	NSV	BIR	ATL	GPS	MBS	VAL	DAY	ODS	OBS	ISP	GLN	BRI	NSV	CCF	AWS	SMR	PIF	AUG	CLB	DTS	BLV	BGS	DAR; DNQ	HCY	LIN	ODS	RCH	MAR	NWS	CLT	HBO	CAR	DTS								115th	132	
