= Fred Lovette =

Racecar owner from North Carolina

Fred Lovette is a former NASCAR Grand National Series race car owner from North Wilkesboro, North Carolina; his career spanned from 1961 to 1962. He would employ Pontiac vehicles for the duration of his career.

Drivers under his employment consisted of Brian Naylor and Johnny Allen. Out of 13 races, these drivers managed to collect one win (1962 Myers Brothers 200), four finishes in the "top five," and five finishes in the "top ten." They also managed to lead 284 laps out of 2530 - the equivalent of 1,851.6 miles (2,979.9 km). Lovette's drivers have started an average of eighth place and finished an average of 20th place. In 1961, Lovette failed to earn money from his single race while making $5175 after racing 12 races in 1962 ($53,804.21 when considering inflation).

NASCAR legend Junior Johnson was a known critic of Fred Lovette's management style; complaining that his racing vehicles weren't up to the standards that Junior Johnson was used to in order to accomplish his goals in the NASCAR Cup Series.
