= Dale Swanson =

American stock car racing driver and owner (1918–1996)

Dale Everett Swanson (February 22, 1918 in Castana, Iowa – January 28, 1996) was an American stock car racing driver and owner.

Swanson lived in Harlan, Iowa, and became one of the premier racing engine builders in the 1940s and 1950s. Though he started his racing career driving in the coupe circuit in the late 1940s in Nebraska, Iowa, and Missouri, he was better known for his car building expertise. He was often referred to as a "mechanical genius". Swanson owned the cars driven by Harlan native and racing champion Johnny Beauchamp from 1956 to 1957. In the mid-1950s, Swanson was sponsored by Chevrolet's Racing Division to compete in IMCA racing events. Swanson and driver Johnny Beauchamp dominated the IMCA stock car series winning 43 features and the series Championship in 1956. Swanson was one of the most knowledgeable mechanics in racing when it came to the Chevrolet.

Another Harlan, Iowa racing legend, 1963 Daytona 500 winner Tiny Lund, also drove for Swanson in the early 1950s.

Swanson's racing work continued until the late 1970s at racetracks in Iowa and Nebraska.

Swanson's legacy continued with his son Dale L. Swanson and grandson Dale (Ken) Swanson. Dale (Ken) Swanson spent 15 years working for some of the best NASCAR teams in North Carolina. While working at Bill Davis Racing under head engine builder, Terry Elledge, he built the engine that powered the #22 Caterpillar Car driven by Ward Burton and crew chiefed by Tommy Baldwin, winning the 2002 Daytona 500. He also worked at Richard Childress Racing's (RCR) Engine R&D department and contributed to Kevin Harvick winning the 2007 Daytona 500. While at RCR, he also built engines for Kevin Harvick Racing, Inc. and driver Ron Hornaday who won the 2007 NASCAR Craftsman Truck Series Championship.

== Personal life ==
Swanson was the son of Theodore and Neva Swanson.

Swanson died January 28, 1996 in Harlan, Iowa.
