= Ratus Walters =

Former NASCAR car owner

- Occupation: NASCAR car owner
- Known for: Being the car owner to win the 1962 running of the Southern 500 as well as his innovations while "blue printing" engines.

Ratus Walters (pronounced Ray-tus Walters) is a former NASCAR Grand National Series owner whose career spanned from 1958 to 1964. Ratus also goes by goes by the simpler-to-pronounce name Ray Walters.

== Summary ==
His employees included drivers like Reds Kagle, Elmo Langley, Larry Frank, Ralph Moody, Jim Reed and Johnny Allen. Out of 69 starts, Walters' major speedway victory as an owner came at the 1962 Southern 500, employing Larry Frank as the driver for the event in a 1962 Ford Galaxie. Johnny Allen was provided by Walters with a 1963 Fastback Ford Galaxie; which ran real fast until it got wreck at Atlanta Motor Speedway. During that time there were only four major speedways; Daytona, Charlotte, Atlanta and the grand daddy of them all, Darlington. Walters dedicated himself to being an independent stock car owner by helping independent stock car drivers find the proper rides for them.

Ratus Walters also worked as an Aeronautical Engineer for Thieblot Aircraft in Bethesda, Maryland. Under sub-contract with Republic Aircraft, Ratus was responsible for designing the high speed feeder for the F-105 Thunder Chief's M61 Gatling Gun.

In 1962 Ratus was honored by Bill France Sr. as being one of NASCARS' greatest contributors to the building of the NASAR organization by providing quality race cars and his many innovations. Ratus Walters had cars racing at the Daytona beach course as well as the openings of the Daytona, Charlotte and Atlanta Speedways. He was among the first to introduce sponsorships to the race cars.

His innovations are still being used: He was a pilot and incorporated aircraft oil coolers to his cars to keep the engine oil from breaking down. Then he used the same type cooler to cool rear end grease - he altered an additional rear shock absorber to make it pump the hot rear end grease through the cooler. He was also the first to use a radio to communicate with his driver - he provided Elmo Langley with a pilot's "throat mile" for hands free communication. He designed a threaded cup holding the coil springs in such a way as to make quick weight adjustments - used by most racers today. Ratus suggested painting the rear bumper yellow on cars being driven by drivers who had never driven high speed race tracks before - thus warning all other drivers to expect the unexpected. This practice is still in place.

His methods of "blue printing" engines not only kept Chief Technical Inspector Norris Friel on his toes but his methods adding substantial horsepower to stock engines were admired and questioned by Buick Engineers after his Buick sat on the "middle" pole at Darlington in 1959 - in spite of no other Buick having been raced for many years. Lee Iacocca, while in charge of performance engineering at Ford, also spent time with Ratus, brain picking him after His Ford dominated the field winning the southern 500 in 1962.

Meanwhile, in major races, his drivers managed to crank out four finishes in the "top five" and 16 finishes in the "top ten." Again, in major races, only 85 laps were led out of 9976 laps - the equivalent of driving 9,988.6 miles (16,075.1 km) on regular roads. Walters managed to accumulate $42,365 at major races during his 7-year career as a NASCAR owner ($439,786.88 when adjusted for inflation). In major races, his cars started an average of 17th place and finished an average of 22nd place.

During a four-month suspension from NASCAR in 1959, Walters, himself drove his 1957 Ford at five dirt tracks (one track twice), winning one and finishing in the top 5 the other five times. In 1961, after Reds Kagle's tragic crash at Charlotte, Walters built a short track car which he drove himself. Driving 8 mostly "unsanctioned" races at tracks such as Manassas, Marlbora, Winchester and others, Ratus won five. Ratus Walters built his own cars and "blue printed" his engines during his racing career.
