= Jerry Bowman =

American NASCAR driver (born 1962)

- Born: March 9, 1962; Havre de Grace, Maryland, U.S.

NASCAR Cup Series career
- 19 races run over 6 years
- Best finish: 43rd – 1985 Winston Cup Season
- First race: 1982 Atlanta Journal 500 (Atlanta Motor Speedway)
- Last race: 1987 Budweiser 500 (Dover International Speedway)
Wins	Top tens	Poles
0	0	0

Jerry Bowman (born March 9, 1962) is an American former NASCAR Winston Cup driver from Havre de Grace, Maryland in the United States. Bowman participated in five different Winston Cup Series seasons (1982 through 1989). In his career, Bowman raced 3,812 laps and ran 4,682.2 miles (7,535.3 km) of racing. His total career earnings were $US27,820. Participating in only nineteen races, Bowman never won a race or finished in the top-ten (he failed to qualify for three different races). His best showing was at the 1985 NASCAR Winston Cup Series season where he finished the season with a position of 43rd in the championship – in addition to having had an average start of thirtieth place during the entire season and an average finish of 25th place.

He is no relation to Alex Bowman despite sharing exact last name.

== Races with DNQ results ==
- 1983 Daytona 500 - his first DNQ
- 1984 Daytona 500 - his second DNQ
- 1986 First Union 400 - his third and final DNQ
