= 1962 Southern 500 =

Auto race held at Darlington Raceway in 1962

Race details
- Race 45 of 53 in the 1962 NASCAR Grand National Series season
- 1962 Southern 500 program cover
- Date: September 3, 1962
- Official name: Southern 500
- Location: Darlington Raceway, Darlington, South Carolina
- Course: Permanent racing facility
- Course length: 1.375 miles (2.213 km)
- Distance: 364 laps, 501.3 mi (806.7 km)
- Weather: Temperatures of 93 °F (34 °C); wind speeds of 8.9 miles per hour (14.3 km/h)
- Average speed: 117.965 mph (189.846 km/h)

Pole position
Driver	Fireball Roberts	Jim Stephens
- Time: 130.246 miles per hour (209.611 km/h)

Most laps led
Driver	Richard Petty	Petty Enterprises
- Laps: 95

Winner
No. 66	Larry Frank	Ratus Walters

Television in the United States
- Network: ABC
- Announcers: Jim McKay

The 1962 Southern 500, the 13th running of the event, was a NASCAR Grand National Series event that was held on September 3, 1962, at Darlington Raceway in Darlington, South Carolina.

The transition to purpose-built racecars began in the early 1960s and occurred gradually over that decade. Changes made to the sport by the late 1960s brought an end to the "strictly stock" vehicles of the 1950s. Ralph Earnhardt drove the #47 car for Jack Smith. The car had "Jack" written on the roof, but Earnhardt drove the race and was involved in a spin entering turn one.

== Background ==
Darlington Raceway, nicknamed by many NASCAR fans and drivers as "The Lady in Black" or "The Track Too Tough to Tame" and advertised as a "NASCAR Tradition", is a race track built for NASCAR racing located near Darlington, South Carolina. It is of a unique, somewhat egg-shaped design, an oval with the ends of very different configurations, a condition which supposedly arose from the proximity of one end of the track to a minnow pond the owner refused to relocate. This situation makes it very challenging for the crews to set up their cars' handling in a way that will be effective at both ends.

The track is a four-turn 1.366 miles (2.198 km) oval. The track's first two turns are banked at twenty-five degrees, while the final two turns are banked two degrees lower at twenty-three degrees. The front stretch (the location of the finish line) and the back stretch is banked at six degrees. Darlington Raceway can seat up to 60,000 people.

Darlington has something of a legendary quality among drivers and older fans; this is probably due to its long track length relative to other NASCAR speedways of its era and hence the first venue where many of them became cognizant of the truly high speeds that stock cars could achieve on a long track. The track allegedly earned the moniker The Lady in Black because the night before the race the track maintenance crew would cover the entire track with fresh asphalt sealant, in the early years of the speedway, thus making the racing surface dark black. Darlington is also known as "The Track Too Tough to Tame" because drivers can run lap after lap without a problem and then bounce off of the wall the following lap. Racers will frequently explain that they have to race the racetrack, not their competition. Drivers hitting the wall are considered to have received their "Darlington Stripe" thanks to the missing paint on the right side of the car.

== Race report ==
It took four hours and fourteen minutes to complete 364 laps. Sixty thousand people would watch Larry Frank defeat Junior Johnson by five seconds; acquiring his only win in the Cup Series. Joyce Brown was Miss Southern 500 for that year.

Gary Sain would make his entrance into NASCAR racing at this race while Roscoe Thompson would retire from NASCAR after racing here. Pontiac vehicles were the preferred manufacturer for this race; especially the 1962 Catalina model. There was a high percentage of then-recent model cars in this race; with only one vehicle with a model year of 1960. During the race, Richard Petty had to drive his vehicle to pit road with only three properly working tires.

The race had just passed the halfway mark when Bobby Johns (#72) blew a tire between Turns 3 & 4, ricocheted off the guardrail and caught the oncoming Darel Dieringer (#26). Dieringer's gas tank ruptured and caught fire as the driver fought for control and Bunkie Blackburn (#41) got into the rail to miss the trouble. The car finally stopped and the dazed Dieringer climbed out.

Matt DeMatthews was the last-place finisher after oil pressure issues forced his 1961 Ford Galaxie out of the race. Fireball Roberts earned the pole position with a speed of 130.246 miles per hour (209.611 km/h) but would finish the race in 36th (out of 44 cars) after crashing on lap 74. Larry Frank's winning speed would be 117.965 miles per hour (189.846 km/h). Johnny Allen had an awful crash but left the race without any injury. Due to a scoring error, Junior Johnson was originally flagged as the winner of this race. Johnson went to victory lane; planning to expand his chicken farm with the money he earned from the race. NASCAR officials managed to catch this error and made Larry Frank the winner instead.

Notable crew chiefs recorded as participating in the event included Shorty Johns, Ratus Walters, Lee Petty, Banjo Matthews, Glen Wood and Herman Beam.

Race earnings for each driver ranged from the winner's share of $21,730 ($231,285 when adjusted for inflation) to the last-place share of $400 ($4,257 when adjusted for inflation). The total purse for this event was $71,865 ($764,900 when adjusted for inflation). While a kinescope was responsible for filming this race to an audience that could not see it live, ABC's Wide World of Sports kept a copy of this race on VHS. For superstition reasons from NASCAR driver Joe Weatherly, this race is historically known as the 12th Revival of the Southern 500 instead of the 13th Southern 500. He would collide with David Pearson although they would go on to finish the race.

=== Qualifying ===
Grid	No.	Driver	Manufacturer	Speed	Owner
1	22	Fireball Roberts	'62 Pontiac	130.246	Jim Stephens
2	3	Junior Johnson	'62 Pontiac	129.049	Ray Fox
3	28	Fred Lorenzen	'62 Ford	127.898	Holman-Moody
4	72	Bobby Johns	'62 Pontiac	127.758	Shorty Johns
5	8	Joe Weatherly	'62 Pontiac	127.454	Bud Moore
6	43	Richard Petty	'62 Plymouth	127.143	Petty Enterprises
7	6	David Pearson	'62 Pontiac	127.077	Cotton Owens
8	21	Marvin Panch	'62 Ford	127.012	Wood Brothers
9	46	Johnny Allen	'62 Pontiac	128.671	Fred Lovette
10	66	Larry Frank	'62 Ford	127.601	Ratus Walters

== Top 10 finishers ==
Pos	Grid	No.	Driver	Manufacturer	Laps	Winnings	Laps led	Time/Status
1	10	66	Larry Frank	Ford	364	$21,730	85	4:14:34
2	2	3	Junior Johnson	Pontiac	364	$10,155	29	+5 seconds
3	8	21	Marvin Panch	Ford	364	$5,150	0	Lead lap under green flag
4	7	6	David Pearson	Pontiac	364	$3,325	0	Lead lap under green flag
5	6	43	Richard Petty	Plymouth	363	$5,450	95	+1 lap
6	14	42	Jim Paschal	Ford	363	$2,025	9	+1 lap
7	13	29	Nelson Stacy	Ford	363	$1,525	0	+1 lap
8	19	11	Ned Jarrett	Chevrolet	360	$1,575	0	+4 laps
9	18	4	Rex White	Chevrolet	359	$1,355	0	+5 laps
10	5	8	Joe Weatherly	Pontiac	357	$1,025	0	+7 laps

== Timeline ==
Section reference:

- Start of race: Fireball Roberts officially began the race with the pole position.
- Lap 2: Matt DeMatthews would become the last-place finisher due to oil pressure problems.
- Lap 4: Tom Cox's vehicle had oil pressure issues; causing him to leave the race early.
- Lap 11: Fuel pump problems would force Gary Sain out of the race.
- Lap 14: The engine on Stick Elliott's vehicle gave out; forcing him to retire from the race.
- Lap 15: Bill Champion's vehicle developed transmission issues.
- Lap 39: Roscoe Thompson had a terminal crash; Cale Yarborough managed to overheat his vehicle.
- Lap 58: The distributor on Buddy Baker's vehicle became problematic.
- Lap 59: Bobby Johns took over the lead from Fireball Roberts.
- Lap 74: Fireball Roberts had a terminal crash.
- Lap 76: Richard Petty took over the lead from Bobby Johns.
- Lap 77: Jim Paschal took over the lead from Richard Petty.
- Lap 86: Bobby Johns took over the lead from Jim Paschal.
- Lap 95: Larry Thomas notice that his transmission no longer worked properly.
- Lap 111: Jack Smith had a terminal crash.
- Lap 126: Fred Lorenzen took over the lead from Bobby Johns.
- Lap 157: Richard Petty took over the lead from Fred Lorenzen.
- Lap 161: Junior Johnson took over the lead from Richard Petty; Lee Reitzel would develop problems with his transmission.
- Lap 181: Bunkie Blackburn had a terminal crash.
- Lap 184: Darel Dieringer and Bobby Johns would crash into each other.
- Lap 190: Richard Petty took over the lead from Junior Johnson.
- Lap 196: T.C. Hunt had a terminal crash; forcing him to retire from the race.
- Lap 200: One of the wheel bearings came loose of G.C. Spencer's vehicle.
- Lap 275: Johnny Allen had a terminal crash.
- Lap 280: Larry Frank took over the lead from Richard Petty.
- Lap 291: Engine problems forced Fred Lorenzen out of the race.
- Lap 343: H.G. Rosier's vehicle developed problems in one of its wheels.
- Finish: Larry Frank was officially declared the winner of the event.

Preceded by 1961	Southern 500 races 1962	Succeeded by 1963

Preceded by 1962 untitled race at Valdosta Speedway	NASCAR Grand National Series Season; 1962	Succeeded by 1962 Buddy Shuman 250
