= 1964 Savannah 200 =

Auto race held at Savannah Speedway in 1964

Race details
- Race 20 of 62 in the 1964 NASCAR Grand National Series season
- Date: May 1, 1964; 60 years ago
- Official name: Savannah 200
- Location: Savannah Speedway, Savannah, Georgia
- Course: Permanent racing facility
- Course length: 0.804 km (0.500 miles)
- Distance: 200 laps, 100 mi (160 km)
- Weather: Mild with temperatures of 72.3 °F (22.4 °C); wind speeds of 8 miles per hour (13 km/h)
- Average speed: 70.326 miles per hour (113.179 km/h)

Pole position
Driver	Jimmy Pardue	Charles Robinson

Most laps led
Driver	Jimmy Pardue	Charles Robinson
- Laps: 137

Winner
No. 45	LeeRoy Yarbrough	Louis Weathersbee

Television in the United States
- Network: untelevised
- Announcers: none

The 1964 Savannah 200 was a NASCAR Grand National Series event that was held on May 1, 1964, at Savannah Speedway in Savannah, Georgia.

Andy Buffington's top-10 finish would eventually become his swan song. Over half the field eventually got into the NASCAR Hall of Fame; making this a glorified All-Star Race. Short fields were common in those days because the money was tight for race car drivers, owners and manufacturers alike.

== Race report ==
There were 12 American-born drivers on the grid; Ned Jarrett was credited with the last-place finish due to an engine problem on lap 127 of 200. Jimmy Pardue traded the lead with LeeRoy Yarbrough before he defeated Marvin Panch by one lap. Lug bolts forced Cale Yarborough to end the race on lap 185; though he finished in fifth place. It took nearly 90 minutes for the drivers to complete all 200 laps at speeds averaging up to 70.326 miles per hour (113.179 km/h). Pardue qualified for the pole position by achieving a top speed of 73.111 miles per hour (117.661 km/h) during the solo qualifying sessions. Monetary prizes after this race ranged from $1,000 ($10,138 when adjusted for inflation) to $150 ($1,521 when adjusted for inflation). The combined purse of the entire race was $3,790 ($38,425 when adjusted for inflation).

Andy Buffington made his only start in the racing event, while Yarbrough acquired his first NASCAR Cup Series win. More than half of the racing grid has been nominated to the NASCAR Hall of Fame. Herman Beam, Glen Wood and Dale Inman were the more notable of the crew chiefs to witness this race.

An untitled 1964 NASCAR Cup Series racing event at Rambi Speedway in Myrtle Beach, South Carolina, ultimately became the final race to host less than 15 drivers on the starting grid. The transition to purpose-built racecars began in the early 1960s and occurred gradually over that decade. Changes made to the sport by the late 1960s brought an end to the "strictly stock" vehicles of the 1950s.

=== Finishing order ===
Section reference:

1. LeeRoy Yarbrough† (No. 45)
2. Marvin Panch (No. 21)
3. Richard Petty (No. 43)
4. Buddy Baker† (No. 87)
5. Cale Yarborough* (No. 19)
6. Curtis Crider (No. 01)
7. David Pearson*† (No. 6)
8. Andy Buffington (No. 71)
9. Roy Tyner† (No. 9)
10. Jimmy Helms (No. 88)
11. Jimmy Pardue*† (No. 54)
12. Ned Jarrett* (No. 11)

† signifies that the driver is known to be deceased
* signifies that the driver failed to finish the race

== Timeline ==
Section reference:

- Start of race: Jimmy Pardue started the race with the pole position.
- Lap 127: Ned Jarrett's vehicle had an engine problem, forcing him out of the race.
- Lap 137: Jimmy Pardue developed problems with his vehicle's rear end, causing him to leave the race early.
- Lap 138: LeeRoy Yarbrough took over the lead from Jimmy Pardue.
- Lap 176: David Pearson excused himself from the event because of a problem with his vehicle's rear end.
- Lap 185: The lug bolts on Cale Yarborough's vehicle became loose, forcing him to withdraw from the race.
- Finish: LeeRoy Yarbrough was officially declared the winner of the event.

Preceded by 1964 Virginia 500	NASCAR Grand National Races; 1964	Succeeded by 1964 Rebel 300
