= Charlie Rudolph =

American racing driver

- Born: Charles Rudolph; January 29, 1958 (age 68) Ransomville, New York, U.S.
- Retired: 1995

Modified racing career
- Debut season: 1978
- Car number: 72
- Championships: 12

Championship titles
- 1986 Mr. Dirt Champion; 1986 Super DIRT Series Champion; 1994 Race of Champions Asphalt Modified Tour

NASCAR Cup Series career
- 4 races run over 1 year
- Best finish: 52nd (1987)
- First race: 1987 Budweiser 500 (Dover)
- Last race: 1987 Champion Spark Plug 400 (Michigan)
Wins	Top tens	Poles
0	0	0

Charles Rudolph (born January 29, 1958) is a retired American stock car racing driver who was equally successful competing on both asphalt and dirt surfaces. An engineer by trade, after retiring from driving he became crew chief for Chuck Hossfeld and then for his son Erick Rudolph.

== Racing career ==
Rudolph made five appearances in the NASCAR Cup Series in 1987, bringing Sunoco into the sport for the first time He spent the majority of his career racing in the modified division, competing at the renowned tracks of the northeast, including Fonda, New York; Riverside Park, Massachusetts; and Stafford and Thompson in Connecticut.

Rudolph won at least a dozen track championships including New York State venues Lancaster Speedway, Ransomville Speedway, Rolling Wheels Raceway in Elbridge, Spencer Speedway in Williamson, and Weedsport Speedway. He was inducted into the New York State Stock Car Association Hall of Fame and the Northeast Dirt Modified Hall of Fame.

== Motorsports career results ==
=== NASCAR ===
==== Winston Cup Series ====
NASCAR Winston Cup Series results
Year	Team	No.	Make	1	2	3	4	5	6	7	8	9	10	11	12	13	14	15	16	17	18	19	20	21	22	23	24	25	26	27	28	29	NWCC	Pts	Ref
1987	James Rudolph	04	Chevy	DAY	CAR	RCH	ATL	DAR	NWS	BRI	MAR	TAL	CLT	DOV; 19	POC; 22	RSD	MCH; DNQ	DAY	POC; 13	TAL	GLN	MCH; 36	BRI	DAR	RCH	DOV	MAR	NWS	CLT	CAR	RSD	ATL	52nd	382	
