= 1961 National 400 =

Auto race held at Charlotte Motor Speedway in 1961

Race details
- Race 49 of 52 in the 1961 NASCAR Grand National Series season
- Layout of Charlotte Motor Speedway
- Date: October 15, 1961
- Official name: National 400
- Location: Charlotte Motor Speedway, Concord, North Carolina
- Course: Permanent racing facility
- Course length: 1.500 miles (2.410 km)
- Distance: 267 laps, 400.5 mi (644.5 km)
- Weather: Chilly with temperatures of 66.9 °F (19.4 °C); wind speeds of 14 miles per hour (23 km/h)
- Average speed: 112.905 mph (181.703 km/h)

Pole position
Driver	David Pearson	John Masoni
- Time: 138.577 seconds

Most laps led
Driver	Fireball Roberts	Smokey Yunick
- Laps: 107

Winner
No. 8	Joe Weatherly	Bud Moore Engineering

The 1961 National 400 was a NASCAR Grand National Series stock car race that was held on October 15, 1961, at Charlotte Motor Speedway in Concord, North Carolina.

The transition to purpose-built racecars began in the early 1960s and occurred gradually over that decade. Changes made to the sport by the late 1960s brought an end to the "strictly stock" vehicles of the 1950s.

== Background ==
Around 35,821 spectators traveled to Charlotte Motor Speedway to watch the race. Located in Concord, North Carolina, Charlotte Motor Speedway is a banked 1.5-mile (2.4 km) quad-oval that opened in 1960 for the inaugural World 600. Construction for the track began in 1959 with Bruton Smith and Curtis Turner as architects for the speedway.

== Race report ==
David Pearson, Fireball Roberts and Junior Johnson would dominate the early portion of the race. This race would last for roughly three hours and twenty minutes; an audience of more than 35,000 would see race cars reaching up to 120 miles per hour (190 km/h). Ken Rush was credited with the last-place finish due to problems with his rocker arm on lap 16 out of this 267-lap event. Junior Johnson's top ten finish came as a result of a problem with one of his wheels on lap 256; he was destined for a top five finish until he encountered that problem.

Notable crew chiefs in the event; included Smokey Yunick, Bud Allman, Shorty Johns and Ray Fox.

Most of the vehicles in the race were either Pontiacs or Fords. Junior Johnson, Bob Welborn and Fireball Roberts would be the leaders during the middle portion of the race.

Fireball Roberts' vehicle would suffer severe damage after blowing a right front tire on lap 113. The vehicle struck the guardrail and slid back into a pack cars; a car slammed into it while driving in excess of 100 miles per hour or 160 kilometres per hour. Roberts wasn't injured."

Joe Weatherly would eventually gain the lead on lap 263 and beat Richard Petty by almost two car lengths. This would be the seventh of nine wins for Joe Weatherly in the 1961 NASCAR Grand National Series season. He ended on a hot-streak, winning the next race and then the last race of the 1961 NASCAR Cup Series season as well. Joe Weatherly made four pit stops during the race, one unscheduled. He put on one or more new tires each time. He was the only of the top-10 starters in the top-10 finishers' list. Four caution flags, one for 12 laps, helped the Norfolk veteran to stay in contention.

Individual race winnings for each driver ranged from the winner's share of $9,510 ($102,460 when adjusted for inflation) to the last-place finishers' share of $275 ($2,963 when adjusted for inflation). The total prize purse offered for this event was $42,050 ($453,044 when adjusted for inflation).

=== Qualifying ===
Grid	No.	Driver	Manufacturer	Speed	Qualifying time	Owner
1	3	David Pearson	'61 Pontiac	138.577	2:35.870	John Masoni
2	22	Fireball Roberts	'61 Pontiac	138.497	2:35.960	Smokey Yunick
3	94	Banjo Matthews	'61 Ford	137.308	2:37.310	Banjo Matthews
4	28	Fred Lorenzen	'61 Ford	137.291	2:37.330	Holman-Moody
5	20	Marvin Panch	'60 Pontiac	138.444	2:36.020	Smokey Yunick
6	8	Joe Weatherly	'61 Pontiac	137.265	2:37.360	Bud Moore
7	47	Jack Smith	'61 Pontiac	137.064	2:37.590	Jack Smith
8	72	Bobby Johns	'61 Ford	136.986	2:37.680	Shorty Johns
9	29	Nelson Stacy	'61 Ford	136.761	2:37.590	Dudley Farrell
10	21	Speedy Thompson	'61 Ford	136.588	2:38.140	Wood Brothers

== Top 10 finishers ==
Pos	Grid	No.	Driver	Manufacturer	Laps	Winnings	Laps led	Time/Status
1	6	8	Joe Weatherly	Pontiac	267	$9,510	5	3:20:20
2	22	43	Richard Petty	Plymouth	267	$4,870	0	+1.5 car lengths
3	14	18	Bob Welborn	Pontiac	267	$3,275	51	Lead lap under green flag
4	21	6	Cotton Owens	Pontiac	266	$2,275	0	+1 lap
5	13	4	Rex White	Chevrolet	264	$1,800	0	+3 laps
6	29	42	Darel Dieringer	Plymouth	263	$1,375	0	+4 laps
7	24	85	Emanuel Zervakis	Chevrolet	261	$1,250	0	+6 laps
8	25	14	Joe Lee Johnson	Chevrolet	258	$1,125	0	+9 laps
9	12	27	Junior Johnson	Pontiac	256	$1,535	100	Wheel issues
10	30	30	J. C. Hendrix	Ford	254	$875	0	+13 laps

== Timeline ==
Section reference:

- Start of race: David Pearson had the pole position to begin the event.
- Lap 4: Fireball Roberts took over the lead from David Pearson.
- Lap 27: Curtis Crider fell out with engine failure; Nelson Stacy managed to overheat his vehicle.
- Lap 38: Tubby Gonzales fell out with engine failure.
- Lap 42: Bunkie Blackburn had a terminal crash.
- Lap 54: Banjo Matthews fell out with engine failure.
- Lap 55: Bobby Johns had a terminal crash.
- Lap 74: David Pearson took over the lead from Fireball Roberts.
- Lap 75: Junior Johnson took over the lead from David Pearson.
- Lap 77: Fireball Roberts took over the lead from Junior Johnson.
- Lap 111: Bill Morgan had a terminal crash.
- Lap 113: Fireball Roberts had a terminal crash.
- Lap 114: Junior Johnson took over the lead from Fireball Roberts.
- Lap 136: Marvin Panch had a terminal crash.
- Lap 140: Bob Welborn took over the lead from Junior Johnson.
- Lap 169: Elmo Langley fell out with engine failure.
- Lap 180: Junior Johnson took over the lead from Bob Welborn.
- Lap 197: Bob Welborn took over the lead from Junior Johnson.
- Lap 198: Junior Johnson took over the lead from Bob Welborn.
- Lap 200: Bob Welborn took over the lead from Junior Johnson.
- Lap 204: Junior Johnson took over the lead from Bob Welborn.
- Lap 223: Ned Jarrett fell out with engine failure.
- Lap 252: Speedy Thompson fell out with engine failure.
- Lap 257: Bob Welborn took over the lead from Junior Johnson
- Lap 263: Joe Weatherly took over the lead from Bob Welborn
- Finish: Joe Weatherly was officially declared the winner of the event

Preceded by 1961 Wilkes 200	NASCAR Grand National Series Season; 1961	Succeeded by 1961 Southeastern 500

Preceded by 1960	National 400 races 1961	Succeeded by 1962
