= Louis Weathersbee =

Louis Weathersbee is a former NASCAR Grand National Series race car owner who owned vehicles in 1964 and 1965.

== Summary ==
Weathersbee has employed famous drivers like Bobby Isaac, Bud Moore, LeeRoy Yarbrough, and Doug Yates. After two years and 38 races as an owner, Weatherbee won in two races (1964 Pickens 200 and the 1964 Savannah 200) in addition to 12 finishes in the "top five" and 18 finishes in the "top ten." While making only $10345 for the employer ($105,689.41 when adjusted for inflation), Weathersbee's vehicles successfully led 285 laps out of 5400 - the equivalent of 2,882.0 miles (4,638.1 km) of racing action. The average finish of Weathersbee's vehicles was 11th while starting an average of 9th place.
