= 1961 NASCAR Grand National Series =

American motorsport season

1961 Grand National Series

Seasons
- ← 1960 1962 →

The 1961 NASCAR Grand National season was the 13th season of professional stock car racing in the United States, and contested over 52 events from November 6, 1960, to October 29, 1961. Ned Jarrett captured the championship which was run on 20 dirt tracks, 31 paved tracks, and one road course. Seventeen events were considered short tracks, and 14 events were held at super speedways. Joe Weatherly won the season opening's event at Charlotte, and Jarrett went on to capture the championship with 27,272 points; 830 more than second-place finisher Rex White. Emanuel Zervakis finished third in points, with Joe Weatherly fourth and Fireball Roberts fifth.

== Season recap ==
Ned Jarrett only won one race in 1961, at Birmingham, Alabama, but his consistency proved to be the winning factor in capturing the season's championship. Second place finisher, and 1960s defending champion, Rex White won 7 times throughout the season, but Jarrett's 33 top-10 finishes over 46 of the 52 events was enough to capture the points needed for the season's championship. Third place finisher Emanuel Zervakis captured 2 wins in 38 attempts, and former champion Joe Weatherly won a total of 9 times in only 25 attempts. NASCAR icon Fireball Roberts also had two victories, but only raced in 22 events.

ABC began showing highlights of NASCAR events on its Wide World of Sports television programs in 1961. Pontiac won 30 and Chevrolet 11 times over the course of the 52 event season, giving General Motors a dominating performance. Ford managed to capture 7 victories, while Chrysler managed 4 short track wins. After Pontiac took 5 of the top 6 finishing positions, including the top 3, at the Daytona 500, they began advertisements touting their dominating performance. Pontiac rose to 3rd in US automotive sales throughout the year.

Joe Weatherly took the season opening win at the Southern States Fairgrounds track in Charlotte in November 1960, with Lee Petty capturing the next event at Jacksonville Speedway Park in Florida. When the series moved to Daytona in February, Weatherly and Fireball Roberts each won their respective qualifying events prior to Marvin Panch grabbing the checkered flag for the Daytona 500. On March 5, defending 1960 NASCAR champion Rex White captured his first victory of the season at the Asheville-Weaverville Speedway. Roberts, Cotton Owens, and Bob Burdick also won events throughout the month of March. On April 9 Fred Lorenzen, who had previously won a USAC championship, captured his first NASCAR win at Martinsville Speedway during the Virginia 500. The race was called due to rain after 149 of its scheduled 500 laps, but a follow-up race at Martinsville was then scheduled and was held 3 weeks later, won by Junior Johnson. Lorenzen followed that up with a second win a week after the make-up race, on May 6, at Darlington in the Rebel 300.

On May 28 during the second running of the World 600 at Charlotte, future NASCAR legend David Pearson also captured his first NASCAR victory. Pearson blew a tire with more than a lap to go, but continued on to win the race even though he finished on just 3 wheels. Throughout April and May Richard Petty, Junior Johnson, Lloyd Dane, and Eddie Gray all add their names to the list of winners in the 1961 season.

== Races ==
=== Daytona 500 ===
The third Daytona 500 in the history of NASCAR occurred on February 26, 1961. Marvin Panch won the race in more than three hours after teammate Fireball Roberts suffers a blown engine while leading. Both Lee Petty and son Richard crashed during their respective 100 mile qualifying events, forcing Petty Enterprises into a noncompetitive role for the 1961 Daytona 500. Son Richard crashed through the guardrail and suffered a sprained ankle, and while the car remained upright, the crash kept him from competing. Lee tangled with Johnny Beauchamp when Beauchamp caught Petty's back bumper sending both cars through the guardrail with Petty's car being destroyed. Petty suffered multiple life-threatening injuries, but recovered. While Beauchamp also suffered injuries to his head, they were less serious. Fireball Roberts and Joe Weatherly each won one of the 100-mile qualifying events.

1. 20 – Marvin Panch
2. 8 – Joe Weatherly
3. 31 – Paul Goldsmith
4. 80 – Fred Lorenzen
5. 6 – Cotton Owens
6. 47 – Jack Smith
7. 11 – Ned Jarrett
8. 69 – Johnny Allen
9. 87 – Buck Baker
10. 59 – Tom Pistone

=== Rebel 300 ===
This event took place on May 6, 1961. Fred Lorenzen was the winner of this 2½ hour long race.

1. 28 – Fred Lorenzen
2. 21 – Curtis Turner
3. 69 – Johnny Allen
4. 53 – Bob Burdick
5. 22 – Fireball Roberts
6. 3 – Marvin Panch
7. 6 – Ralph Earnhardt
8. 94 -Banjo Matthews
9. 72 – Bobby Johns
10. 11 – Ned Jarrett

=== World 600 ===
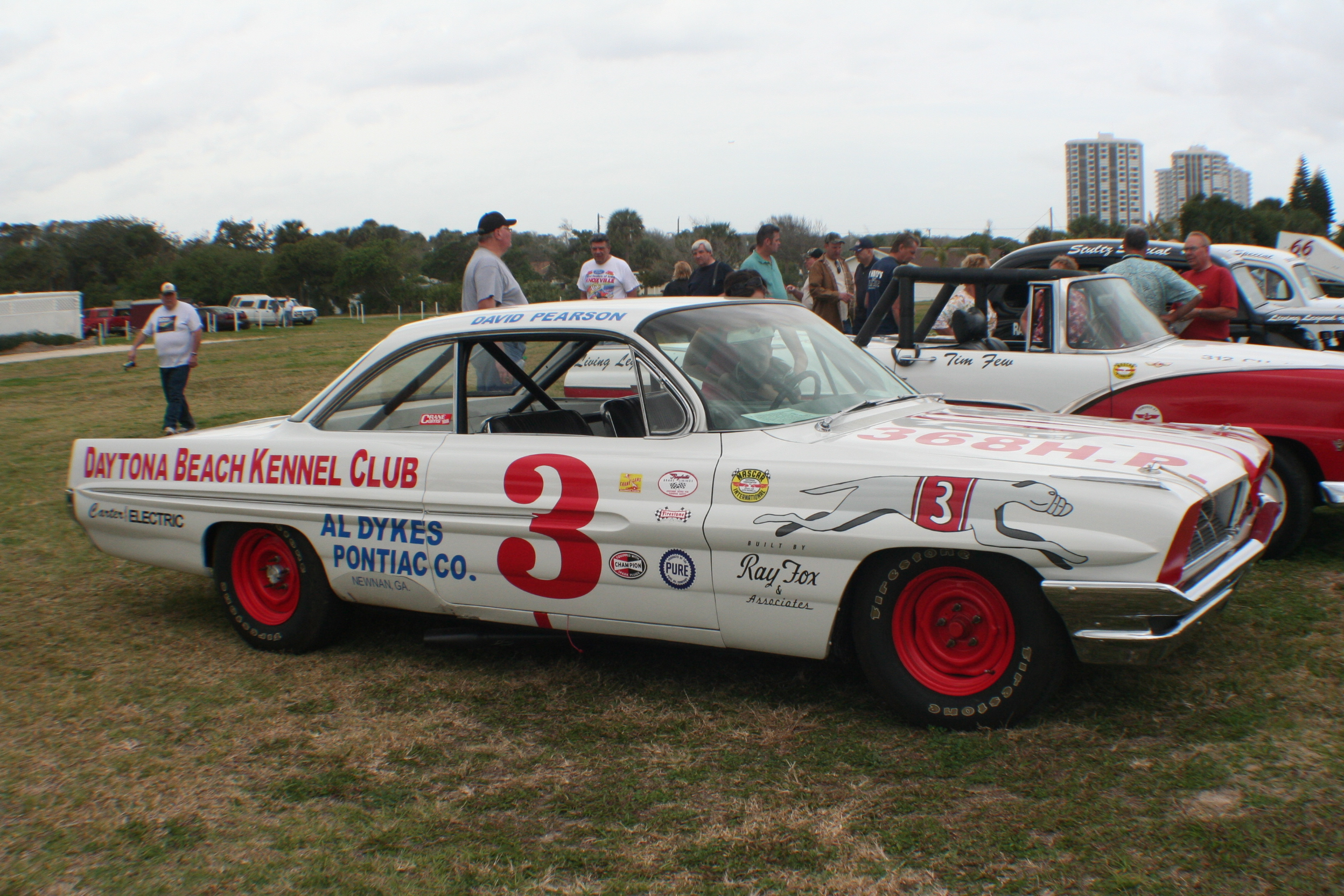
A Fox-prepared Pontiac, driven by David Pearson

This event would make David Pearson the winner on May 28, 1961, at Charlotte Motor Speedway. This was Pearson's first of 105 career victories. Reds Kagle would lose a leg in this race.

1. 3 – David Pearson
2. 22 – Fireball Roberts
3. 4 – Rex White
4. 11 – Ned Jarrett
5. 14 – Jim Paschal
6. 30 – Tiny Lund
7. 46 – Jack Smith
8. 47 – Bob Welborn
9. 27 – Junior Johnson
10. 8 – Joe Weatherly
11. 34 – Wendell Scott

=== Dixie 400 ===
The 1961 Dixie 400 was a NASCAR Grand National Series racing event that was held on September 17, 1961, at Atlanta International Raceway in the American community of Hampton, Georgia.

Seven automobile manufacturers from the United States would demonstrate their fastest stock car vehicles in an attempt to impress new vehicle sales on Monday. Homologation rules during this era only allowed drivers to bring vehicles that are street-legal and driver to the track directly by the competing driver(s). A filming of a full-length feature Hollywood film entitled Thundering Wheels was a part of the festivities planned for this racing event in addition to a 210-minute performance by some of the legendary performers from the Grand Ole Opry.

1. 3 – David Pearson
2. 27 – Junior Johnson
3. 22 – Fireball Roberts
4. 47 – Jack Smith
5. 43 – Richard Petty
6. 14 – Johnny Allen
7. 11 – Ned Jarrett
8. 46 – Bob Welborn
9. 51 – Woodie Wilson
10. 6 – Marvin Panch

=== National 400 ===
The 1961 National 400 was a NASCAR Grand National Series racing event that took place on October 15, 1961, at Charlotte Motor Speedway in the American community of Concord, North Carolina.

David Pearson, Fireball Roberts and Junior Johnson would dominate the early portion of the race. This race would last for roughly three hours and twenty minutes; an audience of more than 35,000 NASCAR followers would see race cars reaching up to 120 miles per hour (190 km/h). Ken Rush was credited with the last-place finish due to problems with his rocker arm on lap 16 out of this 267-lap stock car racing event. Junior Johnson's "top ten" finish came as a result of a problem with one of his wheels on lap 256; he was destined for a "top five" finish until he encountered that problem

Most of the vehicles in the race were either Pontiacs or Ford. Junior Johnson, Bob Welborn and Fireball Roberts would be the joint leaders during the middle portion of the race.

1. 8 – Joe Weatherly
2. 43 – Richard Petty
3. 18 – Bob Welborn
4. 6 – Cotton Owens
5. 4 – Rex White
6. 42 – Darel Dieringer
7. 85 – Emanuel Zervakis
8. 14 – Joe Lee Johnson
9. 27 – Junior Johnson
10. 30 – J. C. Hendrix
