= 1962 Myers Brothers 200 =

Auto race held at Bowman Gray Stadium in 1962

Race details
- Race 25 of 53 in the 1962 NASCAR Grand National Series season
- Date: June 16, 1962
- Official name: Myers Brothers 200
- Location: Bowman Gray Stadium, Winston-Salem, North Carolina
- Course: Permanent racing facility
- Course length: 0.250 miles (0.421 km)
- Distance: 200 laps, 50.0 mi (35.0 km)
- Weather: Very hot with temperatures of 81 °F (27 °C); wind speeds of 6 miles per hour (9.7 km/h)
- Average speed: 45.466 miles per hour (73.170 km/h)

Pole position
Driver	Rex White	Rex White

Most laps led
Driver	Johnny Allen	Fred Lovette
- Laps: 178

Winner
No. 58	Johnny Allen	Fred Lovette

Television in the United States
- Network: untelevised
- Announcers: none

The 1962 Myers Brothers 200 was a NASCAR Grand National Series event that was held on June 16, 1962, at Bowman Gray Stadium in Winston-Salem, North Carolina.

== Background ==
Bowman Gray Stadium is a NASCAR sanctioned 1/4-mile (0.40 km) asphalt flat oval short track and longstanding football stadium located in Winston-Salem, North Carolina. It is one of stock car racing's most legendary venues, and is referred to as "NASCAR's longest-running weekly race track". Bowman Gray Stadium is part of the Winston-Salem Sports and Entertainment Complex and is home of the Winston-Salem State University Rams football team. It was also the home of the Wake Forest University football team from 1956 until Groves Stadium (later BB&T Field) opened in 1968.

== Race report ==
The winner was Johnny Allen, who scored his first win by defeating Rex White by six seconds. While Rex White started the first 22 laps of the race with a commanding lead, Johnny Allen was able to win because he gained the lead on lap 23 and he never lost the lead for the remaining 178 laps of the race. After the race, the total prize winnings given out to all the drivers were $3985 USD ($42,415 when adjusted for inflation). Notable speeds for this race were: 45.466 miles (73.170 km) per hour for the race winner's speed and 48.179 miles (77.537 km) per hour for the pole position speed.

This was only time anyone has won a NASCAR Cup Series race using the #58 as their racing number. Notable crew chiefs on attendance for this race were Herman Beam, Bud Allman and Bud Moore.

The transition to purpose-built racecars began in the early 1960s and occurred gradually over that decade. Changes made to the sport by the late 1960s brought an end to the "strictly stock" vehicles of the 1950s.

=== Qualifying ===
Grid	No.	Driver	Manufacturer	Owner
1	4	Rex White	'62 Chevrolet	Rex White
2	58	Johnny Allen	'61 Pontiac	Fred Lovette
3	54	Jimmy Pardue	'62 Pontiac	Jimmy Pardue
4	43	Richard Petty	'62 Plymouth	Petty Enterprises
5	47	Jack Smith	'61 Pontiac	Jack Smith
6	11	Ned Jarrett	'62 Chevrolet	B.G. Holloway
7	87	Buck Baker	'61 Chrysler	Buck Baker
8	2	Jim Paschal	'62 Pontiac	Cliff Stewart
9	36	Larry Thomas	'62 Dodge	Wade Younts
10	34	Wendell Scott	'61 Chevrolet	Wendell Scott
11	48	G.C. Spencer	'60 Chevrolet	G.C. Spencer
12	8	Joe Weatherly	'61 Pontiac	Bud Moore
13	97	Harry Leake	'60 Chevrolet	Lewis Osbourne
14	1	George Green	'60 Chevrolet	Jess Potter
15	19	Herman Beam	'60 Ford	Herman Beam
16	60	Tom Cox	'60 Plymouth	Ray Herlocker
17	17	Fred Harb	'61 Ford	Fred Harber
18	18	Stick Elliott	'60 Ford	Toy Bolton
19	62	Curtis Crider	'60 Ford	Curtis Crider

=== Finishing order ===
Section reference:

1. Johnny Allen (No. 58)
2. Rex White (No. 4)
3. Richard Petty (No. 43)
4. Larry Thomas (No. 36)
5. Joe Weatherly (No. 8)
6. Wendell Scott (No. 34)
7. Fred Harb (No. 17)
8. Jimmy Pardue (No. 54)
9. Harry Leake (No. 97)
10. Jack Smith (No. 47)
11. Ned Jarrett (No. 11)
12. Curtis Crider (No. 62)
13. Herman Beam (No. 19)
14. G. C. Spencer* (No. 48)
15. Jim Paschal* (No. 2)
16. George Green* (No. 1)
17. Stick Elliott* (No. 18)
18. Buck Baker* (No. 87)
19. Thomas Cox* (No. 60)

* Driver failed to finish race

== Timeline ==
Section reference:

- Start of race: Rex White started the race with the pole position.
- Lap 23: Johnny Allen managed to take over the lead from Rex White.
- Lap 51: Thomas Cox developed issues with his vehicle's brakes.
- Lap 112: Buck Baker's tires became problematic.
- Lap 122: A wheel bearing came loose off Stick Elliott's vehicle.
- Lap 145: A frame from George Green's vehicle became a safety hazard on the track.
- Lap 153: The rear end of Jim Paschal's vehicle managed to come off in an unsafe manner.
- Lap 172: G. C. Spencer's transmission developed major problems.
- Finish: Johnny Allen was officially declared the winner of the event.

Preceded by 1962 Atlanta 500	NASCAR Grand National Series season 1962	Succeeded by 1962 untitled race at Augusta Speedway
