= 1960 World 600 =

Auto race run in North Carolina in 1960

Race details
- Race 21 of 44 in the 1960 NASCAR Grand National Series season
- 1960 World 600 program cover
- Date: June 19, 1960
- Official name: World 600
- Location: Charlotte Motor Speedway, Concord, North Carolina
- Course: Permanent racing facility
- Course length: 1.500 miles (2.414 km)
- Distance: 400 laps, 600 mi (965 km)
- Weather: Very hot with temperatures of 89.1 °F (31.7 °C); wind speeds up to 13.8 miles per hour (22.2 km/h)
- Average speed: 107.735 miles per hour (173.383 km/h)
- Attendance: 35,462

Pole position
Driver	Fireball Roberts	John Hines

Most laps led
Driver	Jack Smith	Jack Smith
- Laps: 198

Winner
No. 89	Joe Lee Johnson	Paul McDuffie

The 1960 World 600 was the inaugural running of the World 600, a NASCAR Grand National Series event. It was run on June 19, 1960, at the Charlotte Motor Speedway in Concord, North Carolina. It was NASCAR's first 600-mile race and it was the longest NASCAR race distance. Joe Lee Johnson was the winner of the inaugural race.

== Background ==
Charlotte Motor Speedway, the track where the race was held.

Charlotte Motor Speedway is a motorsports complex located in Concord, North Carolina, thirteen miles from Charlotte, North Carolina. The track is a 1.5-mile (2.4 km) asphalt quad-oval track that hosts NASCAR racing including the World 600 and the National 400. The speedway broke ground in 1958 with Bruton Smith and Curtis Turner as the architects. Charlotte Motor Speedway is now operated by Speedway Motorsports.

== Race report ==
The race was postponed for three weeks because of construction delays. During the race, Don O'Dell's Pontiac crashed into the driver's door of Lenny Page's Chevy. Lenny Page, who was lucky to survive the crash due to the safety systems at that time, was near death afterward, but reporter Chris Economaki rushed to the scene and aided Page with CPR until safety crews arrived. He was later credited with saving Lenny's life.

Cars were allowed to run dirt track style screens to protect the radiators from debris, as officials were aware of the problem before the race started. This is the only time a father and son have been disqualified in the same race. This was the last time the #89 has won in the Cup Series.

Ed Markstellar and Japanese-American driver George Tet would make their stock car debuts in this race while Jim Austin, Arnold Gardner and Gene Marmor would make their finale. Johnny Wolford would run his only NASCAR Cup Series race here. Rex White would take away the championship lead from Richard Petty with his sixth-place finish as opposed to Petty finishing in 55th place due to a disqualification. Petty and five other drivers (Lee Petty, Bob Welborn, Paul Lewis, Junior Johnson, and Lenny Page) were all disqualified for making illegal entrances to pit road.

Notable crew chiefs included Louis Clements, Bud Allman, Ray Fox, Shorty Johns, Bud Moore, Mario Rossi, Dale Swanson and Paul McDuffie.

=== Results ===
Pos	Grid	No.	Driver	Manufacturer	Laps
1	20	89	Joe Lee Johnson	Chevrolet	400
2	38	73	Johnny Beauchamp	Chevrolet	396
3	6	46	Bobby Johns	Plymouth	394
4	44	92	Gerald Duke	Ford Thunderbird	388
5	14	87	Buck Baker	Chevrolet	386
6	7	4	Rex White	Chevrolet	378
7	31	94	Banjo Matthews	Ford	377
8	40	63	Tiny Lund	Pontiac	375
9	39	81	Shorty Rollins	Ford	374
10	19	67	David Pearson	Chevrolet	367
11	58	78	Charley Griffith	Chevrolet	365
12	2	47	Jack Smith	Pontiac	352
13	49	55	Ernie Gahan	Chevrolet	350
14	59	19	Herman Beam	Ford	344
15	51	38	Jim Cook	Ford	343
16	55	35	Jimmy Pardue	Plymouth	343
17	32	77	Marvin Panch	Ford	341
18	42	21	Jimmy Massey	Chevrolet	333
19	48	20	Buddy Baker	Ford	332
20	28	91	Larry Frank	Ford	320
21	37	48	G.C. Spencer	Chevrolet	316
22	24	45	Joe Caspolich	Oldsmobile	313
23	26	64	Bunkie Blackburn	Ford	311
24	23	61	Jimmy Thompson	Ford Thunderbird	310
25	10	90	Speedy Thompson	Ford	287
26	50	33	Reb Wickersham	Oldsmobile	260
27	41	24	Arnold Gardner	Ford	257
28	13	7	Jim Reed	Chevrolet	246
29	54	17	Shorty York	Ford	243
30	5	11	Ned Jarrett	Ford	233
31	9	59	Tom Pistone	Chevrolet	221
32	22	70	Elmo Henderson	Pontiac	212
33	16	85	Emanuel Zervakis	Chevrolet	209
34	33	15	Johnny Sudderth	Ford	202
35	1	22	Fireball Roberts	Pontiac	191
36	21	23	Doug Yates	Plymouth	176
37	46	51	Roy Tyner	Oldsmobile	176
38	47	50	George Tet	Ford	171
39	3	26	Curtis Turner	Ford	154
40	27	39	Herb Tillman	Chevrolet	138
41	18	28	Fred Lorenzen	Ford	118
42	52	32	Richard Riley	Chevrolet	115
43	15	12	Joe Weatherly	Ford	85
44	36	99	Wilbur Rakestraw	Ford	57
45	30	82	Joe Eubanks	Chevrolet	46
46	35	2	Possum Jones	Chevrolet	39
47	53	74	L.D. Austin	Chevrolet	33
48	43	86	Ed Markstellar	Ford	27
49	25	71	Gene Marmor	Pontiac	24
50	57	9	Jim Austin	Ford	24
51	4	6	Cotton Owens	Pontiac	6
52	17	69	Johnny Allen	Chevrolet	6
53	45	95	Bob Duell	Ford	6
54	56	88	Johnny Wolford	Ford	5
55	11	43	Richard Petty	Plymouth	0
56	8	42	Lee Petty	Plymouth	0
57	12	49	Bob Welborn	Ford	0
58	34	1	Paul Lewis	Chevrolet	0
59	29	27	Junior Johnson	Chevrolet	0
60	60	83	Lennie Page	Ford Thunderbird	0

=== Timeline ===
Section reference:

- Start of race: Fireball Roberts officially started with race with the pole position.
- Lap 5: Johnny Walford had a terminal crash.
- Lap 6: Cotton Owens and Johnny Allen were involved in a terminal crash.
- Lap 27: Ed Markstellar was involved in a terminal crash.
- Lap 66: Tom Pistone took over the lead from Fireball Roberts.
- Lap 74: Junior Johnson took over the lead from Tom Pistone.
- Lap 79: Curtis Turner took over the lead from Junior Johnson.
- Lap 85: Joe Weatherly had a terminal crash.
- Lap 95: Jack Smith took over the lead from Curtis Turner.
- Lap 97: Fireball Roberts took over the lead from Jack Smith.
- Lap 138: Herb Tillman had a terminal crash.
- Lap 141: Jack Smith took over the lead from Fireball Roberts.
- Lap 144: Fireball Roberts took over the lead from Jack Smith.
- Lap 149: Curtis Turner took over the lead from Fireball Roberts.
- Lap 154: Tom Pistone took over the lead from Curtis Turner.
- Lap 160: Jack Smith took over the lead from Tom Pistone.
- Lap 176: Doug Yates and Roy Tyner were involved in a terminal crash.
- Lap 233: Ned Jarrett had a terminal crash.
- Lap 246: Jim Reed had a terminal crash.
- Lap 333: Transmission problems would sideline Jimmy Massey on this lap.
- Lap 341: Problems with his vehicle's frame would take Marvin Panch out of the race.
- Lap 352: Jack Smith would experience problems with his vehicle's fuel tank.
- Lap 353: Joe Lee Johnson took over the lead from Jack Smith.
- Lap 365: Charley Griffith blew his vehicle's engine while driving at high speeds.
- Finish: Joe Lee Johnson was officially declared the winner of the event.

== Race Statistics ==
Section reference:

- Time of race: 5:34:06
- Average Speed: 107.735 miles per hour (173.383 km/h)
- Pole Speed: 133.904 miles per hour (215.498 km/h)
- Cautions: 8 for 45 laps
- Margin of Victory: 4 laps +
- Lead changes: 11

Preceded by 1960 California 250	NASCAR Grand National Series Season; 1960	Succeeded by 1960 International 200
