= Paul McDuffie =

NASCAR crew chief

Personal information
- Born: August 14, 1928 Georgia, U.S.
- Died: September 5, 1960 (aged 32)
- Occupation: Crew chief
- Years active: 1950s–1960
- Employers: Jack Smith; Frank Strickland

Paul Lilborn McDuffie (August 14, 1928 – September 5, 1960) was an American mechanic who was a crew chief in the NASCAR Grand National/Cup Series. He was regarded as one of the best mechanics during NASCAR's first decade of competition. Cars prepared by McDuffie won the 1958 Southern 500, won the pole position for the 1959 Daytona 500, and won the 1960 World 600.

== NASCAR career ==
In 1957, McDuffie became a crew member on the Chevrolet factory-supported team owned and driven by fellow Atlanta racer, Jack Smith.

In 1958, McDuffie became the crew chief for the team owned by Frank Strickland and driven by Fireball Roberts.

Roberts won the Northern 500 from Trenton Speedway on Memorial Day, the second highest-paying race on the NASCAR Grand National schedule. The team won at Raleigh Speedway on the Fourth of July. They won at Asheville-Weaverville on August 17. On Labor Day, Roberts won the 1958 Southern 500 at Darlington Raceway. They scored additional wins at Birmingham and Martinsville in the fall.

In the NASCAR Convertible Division, Roberts and McDuffie won at Lakewood Speedway in Atlanta and the prestigious Old Dominion 500 at Martinsville on June 8.

Roberts left the McDuffie-prepared car to drive for Smokey Yunick in 1959. With Bob Welborn driving, McDuffie's car won the Daytona 500 qualifying race to claim the pole position for the inaugural 1959 Daytona 500. On the morning of the Daytona 500, McDuffie discovered a rocker arm bolt off center and knew the engine wouldn't last the entire race. McDuffie said, "We didn't have time to fix it because we would have had to install a new head. We didn't locate the trouble until we made a last minute check on the valves. That head was the only thing in the engine I didn't build. It was a factory head." Welborn fell out of the race with engine failure after 75 laps. A second McDuffie built car driven by Joe Weatherly finished 5th.

Reuniting with Fireball Roberts, the McDuffie-led team won the 1959 Rebel 300 at Darlington for NASCAR's Convertible Division.

After a disappointing start to 1960, Bob Welborn left McDuffie's team in the spring. Joe Lee Johnson took over as driver. In the inaugural 1960 World 600 at Charlotte Motor Speedway, Johnson won the race in the McDuffie-prepared Chevrolet. The team won over $27,000, the largest prize ever offered in NASCAR history at the time.

== Death ==
Joe Lee Johnson qualified in the 11th starting position for the 1960 Southern 500 with a speed of 125.260 mph. McDuffie was optimistic entering the race, saying pre-race, "Our car is running three miles an hour faster now than when we qualified. And we can run at those speeds without blowing tires. Yes, this could be our day. You know, we're pitting in the same spot we had last year, but maybe we'll be luckier this time."

Before the race, Bob Welborn reportedly felt uneasy about the day, and said to Ralph Moody, "Somebody's going to get it here today. I can feel it."

After 95 laps, Johnson made a pitstop on the backstretch with a flat tire. At the time, there was no wall protecting the pit stalls from the race track. Exiting turn two, Bobby Johns began to lose control. At that moment, Roy Tyner, who was to the inside of him, collected Johns in the left-rear corner and both spun towards the inside pit wall. When the cars were seen coming towards the pits, Johnson accelerated away from his pit without changing the tire. Johns' car hit the concrete wall, breaking a large section of it, climbing on top of it, and striking several crew members as the rear of the car slid along the top of the wall. Johns then flipped four times before landing on his roof on the race track. McDuffie was killed instantly due to head injuries. Also killed were crew-member Charles Sweatland and NASCAR official Joe Taylor. Three other crew members were also injured, as well as Johns who suffered a concussion.

McDuffie's shoes were knocked off his feet from the impact. Speedy Thompson, who standing three feet from Johns' crashing car, said that McDuffie was wearing green socks, green being considered a bad luck superstition in auto racing. Joe Weatherly noticed his shoes were green, recalling he told McDuffie pre-race, "I told him to take those green pumps off or something will happen... I meant his car would never finish." Weatherly reportedly offered him money to remove the shoes, which McDuffie declined. Other reports said McDuffie was also eating peanuts pre-race, another bad luck superstition.

Johnson, who witnessed the entire crash in his rear-view mirror, drove around to the frontstretch and parked his car. "I pulled out, ducked, then looked back. I only saw one man in my crew still standing." He further told the media, "I'll never race here again. I may never race again." Johnson kept his word and never raced at Darlington again. Bobby Johns was inconsolable after the crash, although observers agreed that he had done nothing wrong. Darlington installed a pit wall before the next race. That front stretch pit wall would be damaged in the 1984 Southern 500, and a new extended pit wall would be added in 1985, used until it was decommissioned in 2000. The backstretch pit wall built then was reconfigured to its current version in 2000 after the pit configuration changed for that season.

Race winner Buck Baker said, "There is no one in racing who can't speak a good word for Paul McDuffie." Darlington track president Bob Colvin eulogized McDuffie by saying, "We lost one of the greatest mechanics in the world and two of the men who were helping make racing the great sport it is."

== Personal life ==
McDuffie was married to his wife Velma. At the time of his death, the couple had three children and Velma was seven months pregnant with a fourth. His oldest son, Paul "Sonny" McDuffie, would also become a racing mechanic.

McDuffie was said to never smoke or drink or use profane language. He was known for often wearing a sombrero-style straw hat at the race track.

He was not related J.D. McDuffie.

== Honors ==
Atlanta Motor Speedway established the Paul McDuffie Memorial Trophy, which for many years was awarded to the winning crew chief in races at the track. The first winner in October 1960 was Cotton Owens, crew chief for winning driver, Bobby Johns.

McDuffie was inducted into the inaugural class of the National Motorsports Press Association Hall of Fame at Darlington in 1965.

He was inducted into the inaugural class of the TRW Mechanic's Hall of Fame at Talladega, Alabama in 1986.

McDuffie is a member of the Georgia Racing Hall of Fame.
