= Roz Howard =

American stock car racing driver

- Born: January 1, 1922; Macon, Georgia, U.S.
- Died: January 1, 2013 (aged 91); Milledgeville, Georgia, U.S.
- Achievements: 1957 MARC Southern Late Model Champion
- Awards: 2004 Georgia Racing Hall of Fame inductee

NASCAR Cup Series career
- 6 races run over 3 years
- Best finish: 49th (1960)
- First race: 1956 Southern 500 (Darlington)
- Last race: 1960 Western North Carolina 500 (Asheville)
Wins	Top tens	Poles
0	3	0

Roswell Howard, Sr. (January 1, 1922 – January 1, 2013) was an American stock car racing driver. He competed in the NASCAR Grand National Series and the NASCAR Convertible Division in the 1950s and early 1960s, in addition to racing throughout the southeast, winning the 1957 MARC Southern Late Model Championship.

== Early life ==
Howard was born in Macon County, Georgia, in 1922, on a cotton farm; crop destruction by boll weevils and the Great Depression meant that his family moved to Macon early in his life, where he apprenticed at a local automobile dealer.

Howard served in the United States Army during World War II, stationed in Miami, where his skills with automotive maintenance saw him assigned to the base's motor pool; following the end of the war he returned to Macon and automotive work, purchasing a garage with his personal savings. He began racing in 1946, finishing in the top three in his first race.

After competing and winning at many tracks in north Georgia and South Carolina on the Southern Racing Enterprise racing tour, Howard moved to NASCAR competition, competing in his first Grand National race in 1956, as well as competing in the Convertible Division during the 1958 season. Howard also won the 1957 MARC Southern Late Model championship. His 1958 season was curtailed by a highway accident that left him in a body cast for nearly an entire year. After a pit road accident at the 1960 Southern 500, where he was working as a mechanic for Joe Lee Johnson, that saw three teammates killed, he left the sport. Although he no longer competed at NASCAR's top level, he remained involved in automotive work, maintaining a series of garages in his home of Milledgeville.

Howard was inducted into the Georgia Racing Hall of Fame in 2004. He died on January 1, 2013, his 91st birthday.
