= Wilbur Rakestraw =

- Born: June 6, 1928; Dallas, Georgia, U.S.
- Died: May 7, 2014 (aged 85)
- Awards: 2008 Georgia Automobile Racing Hall of Fame inductee

NASCAR Cup Series career
- 30 races run over 5 years
- Best finish: 41st (1960)
- First race: 1956 Race 31 (Spartanburg)
- Last race: 1961 Southland 200 (Birmingham)
Wins	Top tens	Poles
0	6	0

NASCAR Convertible Division career
- 11 races run over 2 years
- Best finish: 13th (1958, 1959)
- First race: 1958 Race 1 (Daytona Beach)
- Last race: 1959 Rebel 300 (Darlington)
Wins	Top tens	Poles
0	6	0

Wilbur Rakestraw (June 6, 1928 – May 7, 2014) was an American racing car driver. He was born in Dallas, Georgia, into a family of racers. His career included racing in the SRE (Southeastern Racing Enterprises) organization as well as the 11 NASCAR Grand National Series and 30 Convertible races. Rakestraw was known for his toughness and thoughtfulness of other drivers due to one incident at Lakewood Speedway in 1957 when he drove through a fence and into the infield lake to avoid T-boning another driver who had crashed in front of him. After he retired from racing, Rakestraw went to work as a mechanic and later became a service manager for a local grading company.

== Career ==
Rakestraw began his career in 1956 racing at his hometown track, the Dallas Speed Bowl. He drove a 1937 Ford Coupe with the number 999 in honor of Henry Ford's first race car, which had been driven by Barney Oldfield. He continued racing in the SRE circuit at various local tracks including Fairburn, Gainesville, Lakewood, Cornelia, Canton, Macon, and the Peach Bowl.

Rakestraw had 30 starts at 19 different tracks including the last Beach Race in Daytona Beach, Florida in the NASCAR Grand National Division from 1956 to 1961. He placed a top five finish at Columbia, South Carolina and six other top-ten finishes at various different tracks. He started in three Daytona 500 Speedway races where his best finish was 22nd at the inaugural event in 1959. He raced in several NASCAR Convertible Series events in 1958 and 1959, where he picked 3 top fives and 4 top tens. His best unofficial finish was a second place drive in a non-points race at Daytona behind Junior Johnson and immediately ahead of Fred Lorenzen.

Rakestraw was a member of the Midwest Association of Race Cars (MARC) (now ARCA), where he collected numerous wins and top-ten finishes. Due to lack of funds, Rakestraw retired from racing after the 1961 season. In a 2008 interview, Rakestraw said "I was considered a very good race driver. A lot of my friends hated to see me get out of it. If not for financial problems, I'd have been there until I got too old. I enjoyed it as much as anybody could." In 2008, Rakestraw was inducted into the Georgia Automobile Racing Hall of Fame (GRHOF).

== Accomplishments ==
- 30 starts in the NASCAR Cup and Convertible series from 1956–1961
- 1 top-five and 6 top-ten finishes in the NASCAR Grand National Division
- 3 top-five and 4 top-ten finishes in the NASCAR Convertible Series
- 3 Starts in the Daytona 500 (22nd-place finish in the inaugural event)
- Numerous wins in the MARC series
- 2008 GRHOF Inductee

== Death ==
Rakestraw died on May 7, 2014, of congestive heart failure.
