= Jack Smith (American racing driver, born 1924) =

American racing driver (1924–2001)

- Born: May 24, 1924; Metropolis, Illinois, U.S.
- Died: October 17, 2001 (aged 77); Spartanburg, South Carolina, U.S.
- Cause of death: Congestive heart failure
- Awards: Inducted in the National Motorsports Press Hall of Fame; Inducted in the Daytona Beach Hall of Fame; 1959 NASCAR's Most Popular Driver Award; Inducted in the Georgia Racing Hall of Fame in 2002

NASCAR Cup Series career
- 264 races run over 15 years
- Best finish: 4th (1962)
- First race: 1949 Race No. 1 (Charlotte)
- Last race: 1964 Sunshine 200 (Savannah)
- First win: 1956 Old Dominion 400 (Martinsville)
- Last win: 1962 untitled race (New Ashville)
Wins	Top tens	Poles
21	142	23

NASCAR Convertible Division career
- 16 races run over 4 years
- Best finish: 33rd (1957)
- First race: 1956 Race No. 39 (Atlanta)
- Last race: 1959 Race No. 14 (Greenville-Pickens)
Wins	Top tens	Poles
0	7	0

Jack Thomas Smith (May 24, 1924 – October 17, 2001) was an American stock car racer. He raced in the first NASCAR race, in 1949, and is a member of the NMPA Hall of Fame in Darlington, South Carolina.

== Biography ==
Smith was born in Metropolis, Illinois and then moved to Georgia when he was two years old, settling in Roswell, Georgia. Jack got his start in the automotive industry by working in his fathers shop at a young age. Jack worked at a service station in the 1940's near Roswell. He began racing against local bootleggers on rough dirt tracks and asphalt superspeedways, and across fields. He began racing in 1947 after building a car.

Smith made his debut in NASCAR's first race, in 1949 at the Charlotte Speedway, and finished 13th. At the 1958 Southern 500 at Darlington, Jack trailed a car blowing up and getting caught in the oil, his car started to tumble, flipping his car five times and rolling into the parking lot, after a doctor checked him out, he came out un-injured and drove home that night. He won the NASCAR's Most Popular Driver Award in 1959; although he tied Junior Johnson in the initial voting, a second ballot was opened that Smith won. Jack was known in his early days to run mainly Pontiac's. As a result during a time when teams started to get a stranglehold in the sport, engineer Ray Nichols approached Jack to run his car in select races in 1960.

In the 1960s, Smith and team owner Bud Moore became the first to communicate in a race via two-way radio. Smith was known for his racing superstitions of no green cars among other things. After his racing career ended, he focused on his transmission business, He died from congestive heart failure on October 17, 2001.

== Motorsports career results ==
=== NASCAR ===
(key) (Bold – Pole position awarded by qualifying time. Italics – Pole position earned by points standings or practice time. * – Most laps led. ** – All laps led.)

==== Grand National Series ====
NASCAR Grand National Series results
Year	Team	No.	Make	1	2	3	4	5	6	7	8	9	10	11	12	13	14	15	16	17	18	19	20	21	22	23	24	25	26	27	28	29	30	31	32	33	34	35	36	37	38	39	40	41	42	43	44	45	46	47	48	49	50	51	52	53	54	55	56	57	58	59	60	61	62	NGNC	Pts	Ref
1949	Bishop Brothers	52	Ford	CLT; 13	DAB	HBO	LAN	HAM	MAR	HEI	NWS																																																							58th	12	
1950	Bishop Brothers	25	Olds	DAB; 27	CLT	LAN	MAR	CAN	VER	DSP	MCF	CLT	HBO	DSP	HAM																																																			32nd	180	
1950		19	Olds													DAR; 29	LAN																																																	32nd	180	
1950	Bishop Brothers		Plymouth															NWS; 2	VER	MAR	WIN	HBO																																												32nd	180	
1951	Hubert Westmoreland	2-B	Plymouth	DAB; 29	CLT	NMO	GAR	HBO	ASF	NWS	MAR	CAN	CLS	CLB	DSP	GAR	GRS	BAI	HEI																																															39th	360.5	
1951		98	Plymouth																	AWS; 13	MCF	ALS																																												39th	360.5	
1951	B. J. Dantone	44	Plymouth																				MSF; 37	FMS	MOR	ABS																																								39th	360.5	
1951	Wally Marks	57	Olds																								DAR; 48	CLB	CCS	LAN	CLT	DSP	WIL	HBO	TPN	PGS	MAR	OAK	NWS	HMS																										39th	360.5	
1951	Jack Smith	44	Hudson																																						JSP; 2			NMO; 22																						39th	360.5	
1951	Jack Smith	44X	Hudson																																							ATL; 3	GAR																							39th	360.5	
1952	Jack Smith	44	Hudson	PBS; 20																																																														34th	729	
1952	Harold Mays	77	Chrysler		DAB; 31	JSP	NWS	MAR	CLB; 9																																																									34th	729	
1952	Perry Smith	23	Studebaker							ATL; 19	**CCS**; 16*	LAN																																																						34th	729	
1952		8	Studebaker										DAR; 17	DSP	CAN	HAY	FMS	HBO	CLT	MSF	NIF	OSW	MON	MOR	PPS	MCF	AWS																																							34th	729	
1952	Ted Chester	9	Hudson																									DAR; 11	CCS	LAN	DSP	WIL	HBO	MAR	NWS																															34th	729	
1952	Walt Chapman	120	Hudson																																	ATL; 6	PBS																													34th	729	
1954	Jack Smith	122	Olds	PBS	DAB; 6	JSP	ATL; 24	OSP; 19	OAK	NWS	HBO	CCS; 22	LAN	WIL	MAR	SHA	RSP	CLT	GAR	CLB																																														64th	376	
1954	Jack Smith	14	Plymouth																		LND; 23	HCY	MCF	WGS	PIF	AWS	SFS	GRS																																						64th	376	
1954	Jack Smith	141	Ford																										MOR; 17	OAK	CLT	SAN	COR	DAR	CCS	CLT	LAN	MAS	MAR	NWS																										64th	376	
1955		1	Chevy	TCS	PBS	JSP	DAB	OSP	CLB	HBO	NWS	MGY	LAN	CLT	HCY	ASF	TUS	MAR	RCH	NCF	FOR	LIN	MCF	FON	AIR	CLT	PIF	CLB	AWS	MOR	ALS	NYF	SAN	CLT	FOR	MAS	RSP	DAR; DNQ	MGY; 6	LAN	RSP	GPS; 8	MAS	CLB	MAR	LVP	NWS	HBO																		141st	–	
1956	Joe Jones	999	Ford	HCY	CLT	WSS	PBS	ASF	DAB; 70	PBS; 23	WIL; 14	ATL	NWS	LAN	RCH	CLB	CON	GPS	HCY	HBO																																														21st	2320	
1956	Ted Chester	91	Chevy																		MAR; 9	LIN						MAS; 10	CLT	MCF	POR	AWS; 29	RSP; 10	PIF	CSF	CHI	CCF	MGY; 7	OKL	ROA	OBS	SAN	NOR	PIF	MYB	POR	DAR; 27	CSH; 11	CLT	LAN	POR	CLB	HBO	NWP	CLT											21st	2320	
1956	A. L. Bumgarner	55	Pontiac																				CLT; 9	POR	EUR	NYF	MER																																							21st	2320	
1956	DePaolo Engineering	296	Ford																																																					CCF; 18										21st	2320	
1956	Carl Kiekhaefer	502	Dodge																																																						MAR; 1*									21st	2320	
1956	Carl Kiekhaefer	500	Dodge																																																							HCY; 18	WIL; 14							21st	2320	
1957	Ted Chester	610	Chevy	WSS	CON; 20	TIC																																																												5th	8464	
1957	Hugh Babb	47	Chevy				DAB; 34	CON; 1*	WIL; 10	HBO; 3	AWS; 4	NWS; 18	LAN; 7	CLT; 15	PIF; 12	GBF; 2	POR	CCF; 5	RCH; 14	MAR; 6	POR	EUR	LIN; 6	LCS; 6	ASP																																									5th	8464	
1957	Jack Smith	47	Chevy																							NWP; 4	CLB; 1	CPS	PIF; 5	JAC; 5	RSP; 17	CLT; 13*	MAS; 13*	POR	HCY; 1	NOR; 5	LCS; 12	GLN	KPC	LIN; 18	OBS; 5	MYB; 8	DAR; 10	NYF; 17	AWS; 5	CSF	SCF	LAN; 38	CLB; 13	CCF	CLT; 9	MAR; 7	**NBR**; 3	**CON**; 5	NWS; 1	GBF; 4										5th	8464	
1958	Jack Smith	47	Chevy	**FAY**; 7*		CON; 6	FAY; 25	WIL; 4	HBO; 12	FAY; 27	CLB; 2	PIF; 2	ATL; 13	CLT; 2		ODS; 2	OBS; 6	**GPS**; 1	GBF; 19	STR; 8	**NWS**; 2		TRN; 33		CLB; 6*	NBS; 4	REF; 21	LIN; 20	HCY; 4	AWS; 25		MCC; 5	SLS	TOR	BUF	MCF; 17	BEL; 5	**BRR**; 1**	CLB	NSV; 8						BIR; 12	CSF	GAF	RCH	HBO	SAS															5th	7666	
1958	Jack Smith	47	Pontiac		DAB; 3										MAR; 21									RSD; 3							RSP; 32													DAR; 31	CLT																					5th	7666	
1958	Jack Smith	48	Chevy																			BGS; 22																																												5th	7666	
1958	Shorty Rollins	99	Ford																																						AWS; 31	BGS	MBS																							5th	7666	
1958	Gene White	25	Chevy																																																	MAR; 13														5th	7666	
1958	Buck Baker Racing	86	Chevy																																																		NWS; 5													5th	7666	
1958		8	Chevy																																																			ATL; 28												5th	7666	
1959	Jack Smith	47	Chevy	FAY	DAY; 27	DAY; 7*	HBO	CON	ATL; 21	WIL	BGS	**CLB**; 1	NWS; 2	REF	HCY	MAR	TRN	CLT; 10	NSV	ASP	PIF; 1	**GPS**; 20	ATL; 7	CLB	WIL	RCH	BGS	AWS	DAY; 4	HEI	CLT; 1	MBS	CLT	NSV	AWS; 3	BGS			DAR; 28	HCY; 13	RCH; 16	CSF	**HBO**; 16*	MAR; 29	AWS; 3	NWS; 11	CON; 1*																			8th	6150	
1959	Gerald Duke	92	Ford																																		GPS; 4	CLB																												8th	6150	
1960	Jack Smith	47	Chevy	CLT; 1	CLB; 2	DAY																																																												14th	6944	
1960	Jack Smith	47	Pontiac				**DAY**; 1**	DAY; 23	CLT	NWS	PHO	CLB	MAR; DNQ	HCY	WIL	BGS	GPS	AWS; 17	DAR	**PIF**; 18	HBO; 3	RCH	HMS	CLT; 12*	BGS	**DAY**; 1*	HEI	MAB	MBS	ATL; 3	BIR	NSV	**AWS**; 5	PIF	CLB	SBO	BGS	DAR	HCY	CSF	GSP	HBO	MAR	NWS	CLT; 44	RCH	ATL; 26																			14th	6944	
1961	Jack Smith	47	Pontiac	CLT	JSP	DAY; 3	DAY	DAY; 6	PIF	AWS	HMS	ATL; 21	GPS; 19	HBO	BGS	MAR	NWS	CLB; 21	HCY; 13	RCH	MAR	DAR	CLT					PIF; 9		GPS; 1	BGS	NOR	HAS; 2	STR			CLB; 18	MBS; 20				AWS; 9	RCH	SBO	DAR	HCY; 2	RCH	CSF	ATL; 4	MAR		CLT; 37														7th	15186	
1961	Jack Smith	46	Pontiac																					CLT; 3	RSD	ASP	CLT; 7		BIR; 3						DAY; 3	ATL; 5			BRI; 1*	NSV; 15	BGS										NWS; 24		BRI; 21	GPS; 14	HBO											7th	15186	
1962	Jack Smith	46	Pontiac	CON; 1*	AWS; 4																																																													4th	22870	
1962	Jack Smith	47	Pontiac			DAY; 2	DAY	DAY; 4	CON; 4	AWS; 5	SVH; 1*	HBO; 4	RCH; 14	CLB; 3	NWS; 9	GPS; 13	MBS; 1	MAR; 7	BGS; 2	BRI; 3	RCH; 2	**HCY**; 1**	CON; 4	DAR; 4	PIF; 7	CLT; 24	ATL; 13	BGS; 10	AUG; 12	RCH; 8	**SBO**; 2*	DAY; 4	**CLB**; 3	ASH; 1*	GPS; 2	**AUG**; 14	SVH; 18	MBS; 3	BRI; 21	CHT; 10	NSV; 18	HUN; 6	**AWS**; 5	**STR**; 5	**BGS**; 2*	PIF; 3	VAL; 11	DAR; 34	HCY; 23	RCH; 29	DTS	AUG; 12	MAR; 4	NWS; 13	CLT; 24											4th	22870	
1962	Jack Smith	17	Pontiac																																																					ATL; 9										4th	22870	
1963	Jack Smith	47	Pontiac	BIR; 6	GGS	THS	RSD																																																											24th	8218	
1963	Jack Smith	47	Chrysler					DAY; 25	DAY	DAY; 44	PIF	AWS	HBO																																																					24th	8218	
1963	Jack Smith	47	Plymouth											ATL; 29	HCY; 21	BRI; 29	AUG	RCH; 12	GPS	SBO	BGS	MAR; 10	NWS; 10	CLB; 5	THS	DAR	ODS	RCH	CLT; 41	**BIR**; 5	ATL; 24	DAY; 32	MBS							BRI; 24				AWS; 6	PIF	BGS	ONA; 17	DAR	HCY; 19	RCH; 12	MAR; 9	DTS	NWS; 24	THS	CLT; 15	**SBO**; 21	HBO	RSD; 6								24th	8218	
1963	Jack Smith	48	Plymouth																															SVH; 4	DTS	BGS; 5	ASH; 14	OBS	BRR				CLB; 7																							24th	8218	
1963	Jack Smith	48	Dodge																																						GPS; 20	NSV																								24th	8218	
1964	Jack Smith	48	Plymouth	CON; 21																																																														81st	932	
1964	Archie Smith	47	Plymouth		AUG; 32	**JSP**; 3	SVH; 2	RSD	DAY	DAY	DAY	RCH	BRI	GPS	BGS	ATL	AWS	HBO	PIF	CLB	NWS	MAR	SVH	DAR	LGY	HCY	SBO	CLT	GPS	ASH	ATL	CON	NSV	CHT	BIR	VAL	PIF	DAY	ODS	OBS	BRR	ISP	GLN	LIN	BRI	NSV	MBS	AWS	DTS	ONA	CLB	BGS	STR	DAR	HCY	RCH	ODS	HBO	MAR	SVH	NWS	CLT	HAR	AUG	JAC	81st	932	

===== Daytona 500 =====
Year	Team	Manufacturer	Start	Finish
1959	Jack Smith	Chevrolet	41	7
1960	Jack Smith	Chevrolet	2	23
1961	Jack Smith	Pontiac	5	6
1962	Jack Smith	Pontiac	3	4
1963	Jack Smith	Chrysler	38	44

==== Convertible Division ====
NASCAR Convertible Division results
Year	Team	No.	Make	1	2	3	4	5	6	7	8	9	10	11	12	13	14	15	16	17	18	19	20	21	22	23	24	25	26	27	28	29	30	31	32	33	34	35	36	37	38	39	40	41	42	43	44	45	46	47	NCC	Pts	Ref
1956	Schwam Motors	99	Ford	DAB	CLT	HBO	FAY	PCH	MGY	HCY	LCS	GBF	OBS	RSP	LAN	STR	CLB	LKS	TUL	TFT	KSF	MOF	NOR	WIL	CHI	FRS	NYF	TOR	BUF	BEL	LIN	FWS	BGS	CLB	HCY	CLT	FRS	MCF	HEI	RSP	GPS	ATL; 23	MCC	CHI	MAS	CCF	MAR	PIF	AWS	HBO	–	–	
1957	Hugh Babb	46	Chevy	JAC	DAB	FAY	GBF	ODS	HBO	RCH	GPS	WIL	HCY; 3	BGS	NOR	LAN	DAR; 6	CLT	MCC	PIF	NYF	OBS	AWS																												33rd	976	
1957	Bob Welborn	8	Chevy																					PCH; 2	MCF	BGS	CON	PHI	CHI	CLB																					33rd	976	
1957	Jack Smith	46	Chevy																												RSP; 30	NOR; 14	MAR; 5	FAY	CLT	NWS	NOR	WIL	CLB												33rd	976	
1958	Jack Smith	47	Pontiac	DAB	NWS	RCH	BGS	AWS	HCY	CLB	WIL	DAR; 8																																							39th	588	
1958	Wood Brothers Racing	21	Ford										CLT; 20	ATL	MAR	BIR	CLB	GPS	MBS	CLT	WIL	SAS																													39th	588	
1959	Bud Moore Engineering	47	Chevy	DAY	FAY	RCH	HCY	MRL	CLT; 28	HBO; 2	DAR; 30	CLB; 28	AWS; 24	BGS	MAR	CLB; 2	GPS; 12	CLT																																	44th	552	
