= Charley Griffith =

American racing driver

- Born: September 4, 1929; Chattanooga, Tennessee, U.S.
- Died: November 22, 1999 (aged 70)

NASCAR Cup Series career
- 17 races run over 5 years
- Best finish: 40th (1960)
- First race: 1958 Race 43 (Birmingham)
- Last race: 1963 Race 1 (Birmingham)
Wins	Top tens	Poles
0	3	0

Charley Griffith (September 4, 1929 – November 22, 1999) was an American NASCAR Grand National Series driver. He finished third at the 1959 Daytona 500. It is controversial that he finished third, he was still a lap down from race winner Lee Petty. According to NASCAR Hall of Famer Bobby Allison as well as other drivers who were there, Griffith and car owner Paul Hudson, won the race. It is said that due to Griffith’s lack of familiarity and popularity, NASCAR changed the result of the race, to more popular Lee Petty. This finish was in only his third Grand National start. Griffith is part of NASCAR lore as his car was involved in the famous photo finish of the race.

Griffith attempted to race in the 1960 Daytona 500, but did not qualify.

Griffith won the first asphalt race event held at Nashville Fairgrounds Speedway on July 19, 1958. He drove a car owned by Hart Hastings, Brooks Tune and George Tune from Shelbyville, TN. Griffith also won the first asphalt event held at Alabama's Birmingham International Raceway (1962) driving for Harry Mewbourne.
