= John Hines (NASCAR owner) =

Former NASCAR team owner

- Occupation: NASCAR car owner
- Known for: Employing Fireball Roberts in a series of NASCAR Cup Series races

John Hines was a NASCAR Grand National Series race car owner.

== Career ==
Hines was responsible for employing Fireball Roberts for nine races in the 1960 NASCAR Grand National Series season. Hines was also responsible for two of Roberts' wins in addition to two finishes in the "top-five" and three finishes in the "top-ten." Out of 1338 laps, Hines helped Roberts to lead in 578 of them. While only finishing an average of 23rd place after starting an average of first place, Hines would make $19,985 ($217,497.05 when adjusted for inflation) by employing Fireball Roberts to his ride.
