= John Rostek =

American racing driver

- Born: November 12, 1925; Fort Collins, Colorado, U.S.
- Died: December 29, 1969 (aged 44); South Dakota, U.S.
- Cause of death: Private plane crash

NASCAR Cup Series career
- 6 races run over 2 years
- First race: 1960 Copper Cup 100 (Arizona State Fairgrounds)
- Last race: 1963 Riverside 500 (Riverside)
- First win: 1960 Copper Cup 100 (Arizona State Fairgrounds)
Wins	Top tens	Poles
1	3	1

John Edward Rostek (November 12, 1925 – December 29, 1969) was a NASCAR driver from Fort Collins, Colorado. Despite racing in just six Grand National (now the NASCAR Cup Series) events in his career, Rostek earned one victory, one pole and three top tens.

== Early life and education ==
Rostek was born in Fort Collins, the son of John G. Rostek and Ruby E. Rostek. He graduated from Fort Collins High School before he served in the military during World War II.

== Racing career ==
Five of his six races came in 1960, when Rostek made his NASCAR debut at the Daytona 500 Qualifier #2. However, a crash on the fifth lap would cause Rostek to retire from the race, finishing 39th and missing the Daytona 500. In his next race at the Arizona State Fairgrounds in Phoenix, Rostek took the lead midway through the event, led 58 laps and won his first NASCAR Grand National race. Rostek followed his win with two top-ten finishes, finishing third at Marchbanks Speedway and seventh at Montgomery Air Base after leading seven laps and starting on the pole.

Rostek's final Grand National race came in 1963, racing at the Riverside International Raceway. Starting 27th in the forty-four car field, Rostek appeared poised for another top-ten finish before a late crash sidelined him to 16th.

Rostek was the first NASCAR driver using the No. 19 to win a Grand National event.

== Personal life ==
Rostek was president of Lamplighter Motels, with locations in fourteen states; he also owned a construction company. He married Shirley Schnepf in 1944; they had two daughters and divorced in 1967. He and his second wife Carol Hardin Hornbacher died in a private plane crash in 1969, at age 44, near Vermilion, South Dakota.
