= Shorty Rollins =

American racing driver

- Born: April 3, 1929; Granbury, Texas, U.S.
- Died: December 28, 1998 (aged 69)
- Awards: 1958 NASCAR Rookie of the Year

NASCAR Cup Series career
- 43 races run over 3 years
- Best finish: 4th (1958)
- First race: 1958 Champion Speedway Race (Fayetteville)
- Last race: 1960 Southern 500 (Darlington)
- First win: 1958 State Line Speedway Race (Busti)
Wins	Top tens	Poles
1	27	0
- Statistics up to date as of March 22, 2007.

Lloyd George "Shorty" Rollins (April 3, 1929 – December 28, 1998) was the first official Rookie of the Year in what is now the NASCAR Cup Series.

== Summary ==
Rollins began stock car racing in Corpus Christi, Texas. The great success achieved there led him to Fayetteville, North Carolina and NASCAR's Grand National Series. In his rookie campaign of 1958, he had one win at State Line Speedway, 12 top-five finishes and 22 top-ten finishes in 29 starts with car owner Spook Crawford. He won the first stock car race at the Daytona International Speedway, a 100-lap qualifying race in the NASCAR Convertible Division, which gave him a second place start in the first Daytona 500 in 1959. He made 43 starts in three professional seasons and earned $17,018.

Rollins left racing in 1960 with just 43 starts and settled in Pensacola, Florida with his wife, Mozelle, where he established Hurricane Fence Industries. He was a resident of Pensacola until his death at the age of 69.
