= Cotton Owens =

American racing driver (1924–2012)

- Born: Everett Owens; May 21, 1924; Union, South Carolina, U.S.
- Died: June 7, 2012 (aged 88); Spartanburg, South Carolina, U.S.
- Achievements: 1953–1954 Modified Tour champion 1957 Daytona Beach Road Course winner 1960 Daytona 500 pole winner 1966 Grand National championship car owner (David Pearson)
- Awards: National Motorsports Press Association's Hall of Fame (1970); Named one of NASCAR's 50 Greatest Drivers (1998); International Motorsports Hall of Fame (2008); South Carolina Athletic Hall of Fame (2009); NASCAR Hall of Fame (2013); Named one of NASCAR's 75 Greatest Drivers (2023)

NASCAR Cup Series career
- 160 races run over 15 years
- Best finish: 2nd (1959)
- First race: 1950 race (Daytona Beach)
- Last race: 1964 race (Orange)
- First win: 1957 race (Daytona Beach)
- Last win: 1964 Capital City 300 (Richmond)
Wins	Top tens	Poles
9	84	10

Everett "Cotton" Owens (May 21, 1924 – June 7, 2012) was an American NASCAR driver. For five straight years (1957–61), Owens captured at least one Grand National Series win. Owens was known as "the King of the Modifieds" for his successes in modified stock car racing in the 1950s.

== Early racing career ==
Owens was born in Union, South Carolina. His career began after his tour in the U.S. Navy in 1946, in the Modified division that would eventually be organized by NASCAR and pre-dated their Stock Car (Grand National, later Cup) division. Owens earned the nickname "King of the Modifieds" by claiming over 200 feature wins, including the prestigious Gulf Coast championship race. In 1949, he entered 23 races and won 19 of them. In 1951, he sped to victories all over the South, racking up 54 wins. Owens put together a string of 24 straight wins in 1950–51, a feat he repeated twice. Switching from Dodge to the Chrysler-powered Plymouth he continued to dominate the modified circuit, winning the big modified championship race at Daytona two years in succession in 1953 and 1954, and capturing the United States Modified Championship Race three times. He was the 1950, 1953, and 1954 Modified champion.

== Grand National driving career ==
Owens' NASCAR (Grand National) career began in 1950 when he ran three races. He finished 13th in the point standings. Owens entered a few races over the next several seasons without a win.

Owens' first win came on February 17, 1957, at the series' premiere event: the Daytona Beach Road Course. Owens once drove a 1957 Pontiac to victory; beating runner-up Johnny Beauchamp by 55 seconds with the first-ever 100 mph (101.541 mph) average race on the sand. The win was also Pontiac's first NASCAR win. He had his next trip to victory lane in 1958 at the Monroe County Fairgrounds near Rochester, New York.

In 1959, Owens finished second to Lee Petty in the race for the championship, although he did not enter many Grand National races, as he preferred the Modified circuit which at this time had bigger crowds, faster cars, and higher purses to be won. Though he only won one race that season (at Richmond International Raceway), Owens was making a name for himself as a racer. He attempted 37 races that season, with 22 top-tens and 13 top-fives. In 1961, he had his most productive season with 11 top-fives and four wins in only 17 starts. He had a win at his hometown of Spartanburg, South Carolina (Piedmont Interstate Fairgrounds).

== 1960–1965 ==
As Owens transitioned to NASCAR's Grand National "Stock Car" division, he cemented his place among the sport's elite drivers building and driving Pontiacs wearing his now-signature red and white color scheme and infamous No. 6. What made Owens great was not only his driving ability but his mechanical aptitude and car preparation that made him a force to be reckoned with wherever he raced, on dirt or the pavement. Owens captured five Grand National victories through 1960–62 as a driver, and also put several notable drivers behind the wheel, including Bobby Johns, Ralph Earnhardt, Marvin Panch, Fireball Roberts, Junior Johnson, and fellow Spartanburger David Pearson, who was making a name for himself as an up-and-coming driver. Cotton Owens Garage earned six victories during these years, as well as 31 top-five and 38 top-ten finishes, and five pole positions. Owens put his Pontiac on Pole for the 1960 Daytona 500 and also shattered the qualifying record at Darlington with a 126.146 mph average speed.

In 1962, Owens hired the legendary driver and car owner Junior Johnson. He also started his relationship with fellow Spartanburg resident David Pearson. He came out of retirement in 1964 to prove that he could beat Pearson. He beat Pearson in his final career win (at Richmond). Two races later, he finished second in his final career race (to Ned Jarrett).

In 1962, Chrysler Motor Company consulted Owens, Ray Nichels, Ray Fox, and Maurice Petty about its future in stock car racing. Owens mentioned to Gail Porter that Chrysler had a powerplant in the old Hemi engines of the 1950s and suggested that they convert them for modern racing. "I was more than a little surprised when he told me that if I was willing to come with Chrysler, they would build a completely new Hemi," recalled Cotton.

In 1963, Owens would sign with Dodge as a factory team, fielding a stable of race cars for notable drivers including David Pearson, Billy Wade, Bobby Isaac, Jim Paschal, and G.C. Spencer. Pearson and Wade would be the team's top drivers, with 69 starts between them in '63. Owens built a new 20,000 square foot garage behind his home, which would be the epicenter of racing in Spartanburg, South Carolina. Although the team would not win a race in their first season with Dodge, they did earn 17 top-five and 34 top-ten finishes, as well as two pole positions.

Chrysler released the hemispherical combustion chamber engine in 1964 and took stock car racing to a new level. 1964 would be the breakout season for the Cotton Owens team, with Owens tapping the Hemi's potential and Hotshoe David Pearson capturing eight wins on the Grand National circuit, 29 top-fives, and 42 top-ten finishes as well as 12 pole positions in 61 starts. Owens himself would even briefly step out of retirement to show Pearson a thing or two about pit stops and taking care of his equipment at a USAC race in Richmond in 1964, where Owens wound up winning and Pearson finished second in a now-infamous race. Pearson would go on to finish third in the Grand National Championship standings, setting the stage for a partnership that would see continued success in the years to come.

That success was soon interrupted as the Hemi powerplant proved to be so dominant that NASCAR banned the Hemi from competition in mid-1965, and Chrysler, in turn, boycotted NASCAR racing. Pearson did manage to run 14 races in 1965, with two wins, eight top-fives, 11 top-tens, and one pole position.

In 1965, the Chrysler Hemi engine was not allowed in NASCAR. Owens and Pearson boycotted NASCAR and ran a Hemi in the back of a Dodge Dart drag racing car. They ran nitro and alcohol in the Experimental class. They returned to NASCAR in 1966, and they won the Grand National Championship. They parted ways early in the 1967 season. During their six seasons together, Owens and Pearson combined for 27 wins in 170 races.

== 1966–1967 ==
With dwindling factory and fan support following NASCAR's ban of the Hemi from competition in 1965, NASCAR relented in 1966 and again changed the rules to allow the Hemi back on the track, with concessions made for Ford and General Motors to help even the competition. Chrysler was intent on picking up where they left off, putting full factory support and engineering resources at the disposal of the factory racing teams, with Cotton Owens Garage and the Pettys leading the charge.

1966 was the breakout year for the Cotton Owens Dodge team, now in their fourth year and hitting full stride on the NASCAR circuit. With David Pearson as his primary driver and Cotton now out of the driver's seat and working full-time under the hood, they claimed 15 victories on the Grand National tour and capture the NASCAR Championship, with 26 top-fives and 33 top-ten finishes, and seven pole positions in 42 starts. Pearson won 15 times in 1966, including sweeping both races at Hickory, Winston-Salem, and Richmond. In 42 starts, he was running at the end 34 times. Of those 34, he finished out of the top-ten just once. He was in the top-five 26 times, including thirds in the Daytona 500 and Southern 500.

With Owens' mechanical aptitude and the Hemi engine powering the COG Dodges, their successful partnership made hometown Spartanburg proud. Other notable drivers who climbed behind the wheel for Owens in 1966–67 included Buddy Baker, Bobby Isaac, Bobby Allison, Darel Dieringer, Ray Hendrick, Sam McQuagg, and open-wheel Hotshoe Mario Andretti, who came South for the big race at Daytona and looked to Cotton to put him in a ride capable of winning, which was becoming commonplace at Cotton Owens Garage during its heyday of the mid-1960s.

== 1968–1970 ==
The end of the 1960s saw the Cotton Owens Garage campaigning Dodges in a variety of form factors designed specifically for maximum performance at different tracks, including the Charger 500 and Charger Daytona that turned NASCAR racing on its head and forever changed the way aerodynamics would affect motorsports competition. Drivers of this era include "Leadfoot" Buddy Baker, Chargin' Charlie Glotzbach, Sam Posey, open-wheel star Al Unser, and fellow Spartanburg native James Hylton. Glotzbach served as the primary driver in 1968, with 19 starts and one victory at the Charlotte 500, as well as nine top-fives, 11 top-tens, and three pole positions. Buddy Baker was the COG primary driver in 1969 and '70, with 29 starts, one win, 13 top-fives, 17 top-tens, and one pole position.

Baker's lone win in a Cotton Owens Dodge was at the Darlington Southern 500 in 1970, a race which had eluded Cotton as a driver and owner for more than 20 years. On the Saturday night before the annual Labor Day classic, Owens was inducted into the Hall of Fame by the National Motorsports Press Association.

Baker's all-out style would cost him several notable races, including the 1969 Texas 500, but it served him well as he piloted the Chrysler Engineering blue Daytona No. 88 to a new closed-course record of better than 200 mph at Talladega on March 24, 1970. When the side glass was removed in late March 1970, no stock car ever went over 200 in a NASCAR sanctioned race in 1970. The August 1970 issue of Stock Car Racing Magazine reported that Lee Roy Yarborough ran one race lap in April 1970 at 199.mph. It was the end of an era, as restrictor plates would control the top speeds.

== 1971–1974 ==
The dawn of the 1970s saw the Cotton Owens Garage switch from Dodge to Plymouth, as Chrysler wanted to resurrect the marque by giving it more of a performance edge. The dominance of the Dodge Daytona and Hemi combination gave NASCAR no choice but to outlaw both the car and the engine, requiring new restrictor plates on the superspeedways. For the 1971 season, Cotton Owens teamed up with Pete Hamilton, who piloted his '71 Plymouth Roadrunner to victory lane at the 1971 Daytona 500 qualifier. Hamilton started a total of 20 races, with one win, 11 top-fives, 12 top-tens, and two pole positions. Other drivers included Charlie Glotzbach, Peter Gregg, and another Spartanburg native, Dick Brooks. During this era, the same car was often re-bodied as either a Plymouth Roadrunner or a Dodge Charger, utilizing the same chassis and drivetrain but updated to keep up with NASCAR rule changes or factory dictates.

Another notable COG race car driver during this time was country Western musician Marty Robbins. Robbins loved NASCAR racing and raced occasionally. His cars were built and maintained by Cotton Owens up until he died in 1982, although he did drive Buicks for Junior Johnson shortly at the end of his career. Robbins always tried to race at the race tracks in Talladega and Daytona every year, and then a smattering of the smaller races when time permitted.

In addition to his recordings and performances, Robbins was an avid race car driver, competing in 35 career NASCAR races with six top-ten finishes, including the 1973 Firecracker 400. In 1967, Robbins played himself in the car racing film Hell on Wheels. Robbins, who was partial to Dodges, owned and raced Dodge Chargers and later a 1978 Dodge Magnum in the famous purple and Day-Glo yellow paint scheme.

== Car owner summary ==
Cotton was fortunate to have some of the biggest names in the sport drive his cars over the years. Drivers for Cotton Owens included many legends: David Pearson, Buddy Baker, Pete Hamilton, Marty Robbins, Ralph Earnhardt, Bobby Isaac, Junior Johnson, Benny Parsons, Fireball Roberts, Mario Andretti, Charlie Glotzbach, and Al Unser. In all, a total of 25 drivers climbed behind the wheel of Owens' cars in 291 races, earning 32 victories and 29 pole positions. In total, as a car owner and as a driver, Owens' career statistics include 41 wins and 38 poles in 487 races.

== Death ==
Seven years after being diagnosed with lung cancer, Owens died on June 7, 2012, at the age of 88, just a few weeks after it was announced he would be inducted into the NASCAR Hall of Fame's 2013 class.

== Awards ==
- Announced as a member of the 2013 Inductee Class at the NASCAR Hall of Fame on May 23, 2012.
- Inducted into the South Carolina Athletic Hall of Fame in 2009.
- Owens was announced as a 2008 inductee in the International Motorsports Hall of Fame.
- Historic Speedway Group - Occoneechee-Orange Speedway (Hillsborough, NC) Hall of Fame Inductee (2008 ).
- In 1970, Owens was inducted into the National Motorsports Press Association's Hall of Fame at Darlington Speedway.
- Owens was named one of NASCAR's 50 Greatest Drivers during NASCAR's 50th Anniversary celebration in 1998.
- Recipient of the Order of the Palmetto, the highest civilian honor awarded by the Governor of South Carolina, created in 1971 to recognize lifetime achievement and service to the State of South Carolina. September 16, 2006
- Member Darlington Records Club
- Member NASCAR Mechanics Hall of Fame
- Member NASCAR Legends
- Pioneer of Racing Award, Living Legends of Auto Racing, February 15, 2006
- Presented with the Smokey Yunick Award for “Lifetime Achievement in Auto Racing” on May 28, 2000
- Honored by the Vance County Tourism Dept., Henderson, NC with the “East Coast Drag Times Hall of Fame Motorsports Pioneer Award” on October 16, 005
- Recipient of the “Car Owner’s of the 1960s” award by the Old Timer's Racing Club, 1996
- Recipient of the "Mechanic of the 1960s" award by the Old Timer's Racing Club, 1998

=== Other notable achievements ===
- Won NASCAR's first live televised race
- Gave Dodge its last NASCAR victory in a wing car.
- Earned Pontiac its first NASCAR win when Cotton Owens won on the old beach course at Daytona in 1957 driving a '57 Pontiac prepared by Ray Nichels.

== Motorsports career results ==
=== NASCAR ===
(key) (Bold – Pole position awarded by qualifying time. Italics – Pole position earned by points standings or practice time. * – Most laps led.)

==== Grand National Series ====
NASCAR Grand National Series results
Year	Team	No.	Make	1	2	3	4	5	6	7	8	9	10	11	12	13	14	15	16	17	18	19	20	21	22	23	24	25	26	27	28	29	30	31	32	33	34	35	36	37	38	39	40	41	42	43	44	45	46	47	48	49	50	51	52	53	54	55	56	57	58	59	60	61	62	NGNC	Pts	Ref
1950	Owens Racing	5	Plymouth	DAB; 14																																																														13th	500	
1950	Owens Racing	71	Ford		CLT; 17	LAN	MAR	CAN	VER	DSP	MCF	CLT	HBO	DSP	HAM																																																			13th	500	
1950	F. J. Bland	71	Plymouth													DAR; 7	LAN	NWS	VER	MAR	WIN	HBO																																												13th	500	
1951	F. J. Bland	71	Plymouth	DAB	CLT	NMO	GAR	HBO	ASF	NWS	MAR	CAN	CLS	CLB	DSP	GAR	GRS	BAI	HEI	AWS	MCF	ALS	MSF	FMS	MOR	ABS	DAR; 23	CLB; 7	CCS; 6	LAN	CLT; 15	DSP	WIL	HBO	TPN	PGS	MAR	OAK																												42nd	312.5	
1951	Owens Racing	71	Studebaker																																				NWS; 5	HMS	JSP	ATL	GAR	NMO																						42nd	312.5	
1952			Olds	PBS	DAB	JSP	NWS	MAR	CLB	ATL	CCS	LAN	DAR	DSP	CAN	HAY; 13	FMS	HBO	CLT	MSF	NIF	OSW	MON	MOR	PPS	MCF	AWS	DAR																																						65th	-	
1952			Ford																										CCS; 18	LAN	DSP	WIL	HBO; 29	MAR; 9	NWS	ATL	PBS																													65th	-	
1953	George Hutchens	6	Ford	PBS	DAB	HAR	NWS	CLT	RCH	CCS	LAN	CLB	HCY	MAR	PMS	RSP; 21	LOU	FFS	LAN	TCS	WIL	MCF	PIF	MOR	ATL	RVS	LCF	DAV	HBO	AWS	PAS	HCY	DAR	CCS	LAN	BLF	WIL	NWS	MAR	ATL																										76th	150	
1954	George Hutchens	6	Olds	PBS	DAB	JSP	ATL	OSP	OAK	NWS	HBO	CCS	LAN	WIL	MAR	SHA	RSP	CLT	GAR	CLB	LND	HCY	MCF	WGS	PIF	AWS	SFS	GRS	MOR	OAK	CLT; 9	SAN	COR																																	84th	228	
1954		83	Hudson																															DAR; 34	CCS	CLT	LAN	MAS																												84th	228	
1954		182	Olds																																				MAR; 42																											84th	228	
1954		182	Hudson																																					NWS; 23																										84th	228	
1955	Lancaster Brothers	70	Chevy	TCS	PBS	JSP	DAB	OSP	CLB	HBO	NWS	MGY	LAN	CLT	HCY	ASF	TUS	MAR	RCH	NCF	FOR	LIN	MCF	FON	AIR	CLT	PIF; 5	CLB	AWS	MOR	ALS	NYF	SAN	CLT	FOR	MAS	RSP	DAR; 8	MGY	LAN	RSP	GPS	MAS	CLB	MAR	LVP	NWS	HBO																		29th	1248	
1956	Lancaster Brothers	70	Chevy	HCY; 15	CLT; 10	WSS	PBS	ASF																																																										52nd	-	
1956	Jim Stephens	286	Pontiac						DAB; 61	PBS	WIL	ATL	NWS				CON; 16	GPS	HCY; 7	HBO; 5	MAR; 27	LIN	CLT	POR	EUR	NYF	MER	MAS	CLT	MCF	POR	AWS	RSP	PIF	CSF	CHI	CCF	MGY	OKL	ROA	OBS	SAN	NOR	PIF	MYB	POR	DAR	CSH	CLT	LAN	POR	CLB	HBO	NWP	CLT	CCF	MAR	HCY	WIL							52nd	-	
1956	Jim Stephens	86	Pontiac											LAN; 7	RCH	CLB																																																		52nd	-	
1957	Nichels Engineering	6	Pontiac	WSS	CON	TIC	DAB; 1*								PIF; 19	GBF	POR	CCF; 7	RCH; 21	MAR; 22	POR	EUR	LIN	LCS; 13	ASP	NWP	CLB	CPS	PIF; 17	JAC	RSP; 50	CLT	MAS; 7	POR	HCY; 18	NOR	LCS; 19	GLN	KPC	LIN	OBS	MYB	**DAR**; 2	NYF	AWS; 16*	CSF	SCF	LAN	CLB	CCF	CLT	MAR; 38	NBR	CON; 13	NWS; 5	GBF										14th	4200	
1957	James Satcher	82	Ford					CON; 10	WIL	HBO	AWS	NWS	LAN	CLT																																																				14th	4200	
1958	Jim Stephens	6	Pontiac	FAY	DAB; 10	CON; 7	FAY	WIL	HBO	FAY	CLB	PIF; 26	ATL; 11	CLT; 7				GPS; 18	GBF	STR	NWS; 6	BGS; 8							HCY; 8	AWS; 14		MCC; 2	SLS	TOR; 2	BUF; 2	MCF; 1*	BEL		CLB; 3	NSV; 29	AWS; 36	BGS	MBS		CLT; 15																					17th	3716	
1958	Jim Stephens	3	Pontiac												MAR; 38	ODS	OBS						TRN; 26	RSD	CLB	NBS	REF	LIN			**RSP**; 45							BRR; 2								**BIR**; 9	CSF	GAF	RCH; 7	HBO; 22	SAS; 3	MAR; 10	NWS; 4	ATL												17th	3716	
1958	Owens Racing	4	Dodge																																									DAR; 43																						17th	3716	
1959	W. H. Watson	6	Pontiac	FAY	DAY; 6	DAY; 4	HBO; 9	CON; 2	ATL; 14	WIL; 11		CLB; 5	NWS; 3	REF; 14	HCY; 5	MAR; 10	TRN; 2*		NSV; 8	ASP	**PIF**; 15	GPS; 16	ATL; 25	CLB; 15	WIL; 11	RCH; 5				HEI; 5	CLT; 4		CLT; 29				GPS; 2	CLB																												2nd	9962	
1959	Don Every	82	Ford								BGS; 10							CLT; 3									BGS; 11	AWS; 6				MBS; 19																																		2nd	9962	
1959	W. H. Watson	6	Ford																										DAY; 8						AWS; 7	BGS			DAR; 19	HCY	**RCH**; 1	CSF	HBO; 2	MAR; 33	AWS; 11	NWS	CON; 28																			2nd	9962	
1959	Roy Tyner	9	Chevy																															NSV; 6																																2nd	9962	
1960	Owens Racing	6	Pontiac	CLT	CLB	**DAY**; 2	DAY	**DAY**; 40	CLT				MAR; DNQ	HCY	WIL	BGS	GPS	AWS						CLT; 51	BGS	DAY; 2	HEI	MAB	MBS	ATL; 2*	BIR	NSV	AWS					DAR; 24	HCY	CSF	GSP	HBO	MAR	NWS; 18	CLT	RCH	ATL																			39th	3050	
1960	Dick Freeman	50	Ford							NWS; 16	PHO	CLB																																																						39th	3050	
1960	Owens Racing	5	Pontiac																DAR; 13	PIF; 3	HBO; 12	RCH; 17	HMS											**PIF**; 1	CLB; 15	SBO	BGS																													39th	3050	
1961	Owens Racing	6	Pontiac	CLT	JSP	DAY	DAY; 3	DAY; 5						HBO; 1	BGS	MAR; 13	NWS	CLB; 1	HCY	RCH; 2	MAR	DAR	CLT					PIF; 2*	BIR	GPS	BGS	NOR	HAS	STR	DAY	ATL	**CLB**; 1	MBS	BRI; 40	NSV	BGS	AWS	RCH	**SBO**; 17	DAR	HCY; 4	RCH; 17	CSF	ATL	MAR	NWS; 25	CLT; 4	BRI	GPS	HBO											22nd	8032	
1961	Owens Racing	5	Pontiac						PIF; 1	AWS; 2	HMS	ATL	GPS																																																					22nd	8032	
1961	Bud Moore Engineering	18	Pontiac																					CLT; 16	RSD	ASP	CLT																																							22nd	8032	
1962	Owens Racing	6	Pontiac	CON; 3	AWS	DAY; 3	DAY	DAY; 33	CON; 13	AWS	SVH; 2	HBO; 20	RCH; 7	CLB; 18	NWS; 30	GPS	MBS	MAR	BGS	BRI	RCH	HCY; 17	CON; 2	DAR; 5	**PIF**; 15	CLT							CLB; 4	ASH	GPS	AUG	SVH	MBS	BRI	CHT	NSV	HUN	AWS	STR	BGS	PIF; 4	VAL	DAR	HCY	RCH	DTS	AUG	MAR	NWS	CLT	ATL										30th	4984	
1962	Owens Racing	7	Pontiac																								ATL; 41	BGS	AUG	RCH	SBO	DAY																																		30th	4984	
1963	Owens Racing	16	Dodge	BIR	GGS	THS	RSD	DAY	DAY	DAY	PIF	AWS	HBO	ATL	HCY	BRI	AUG	RCH	GPS	SBO	BGS	MAR	NWS	CLB	THS	DAR	ODS	RCH	CLT	BIR	ATL	DAY	MBS	SVH	DTS	BGS	ASH	OBS	BRR	BRI	GPS	NSV	CLB	AWS	PIF; 8	BGS	ONA	DAR	HCY	RCH	MAR	DTS	NWS	THS	CLT	SBO	HBO	RSD								114th	228	
1964	Owens Racing	5	Dodge	CON	AUG	JSP	SVH	RSD	DAY	DAY	DAY	RCH	BRI	GPS	BGS	ATL	AWS	HBO	PIF	CLB	NWS	MAR	SVH	DAR	LGY	HCY	SBO	CLT	GPS	ASH	ATL	CON	NSV	CHT	BIR	VAL	PIF	DAY	ODS	OBS	BRR	ISP	GLN	LIN	BRI	NSV	MBS	AWS	DTS	ONA	CLB	BGS	STR	DAR	HCY	RCH; 1	ODS	HBO; 2	MAR	SVH	NWS	CLT	HAR	AUG	JAC	80th	980	

===== Daytona 500 =====
Year	Team	Manufacturer	Start	Finish
1959	W. H. Watson	Pontiac	23	6
1960	Owens Racing	Pontiac	**1**	40
1961	Owens Racing	Pontiac	6	5
1962	Owens Racing	Pontiac	5	33
