= Fireball Roberts =

American racing driver (1929–1964)

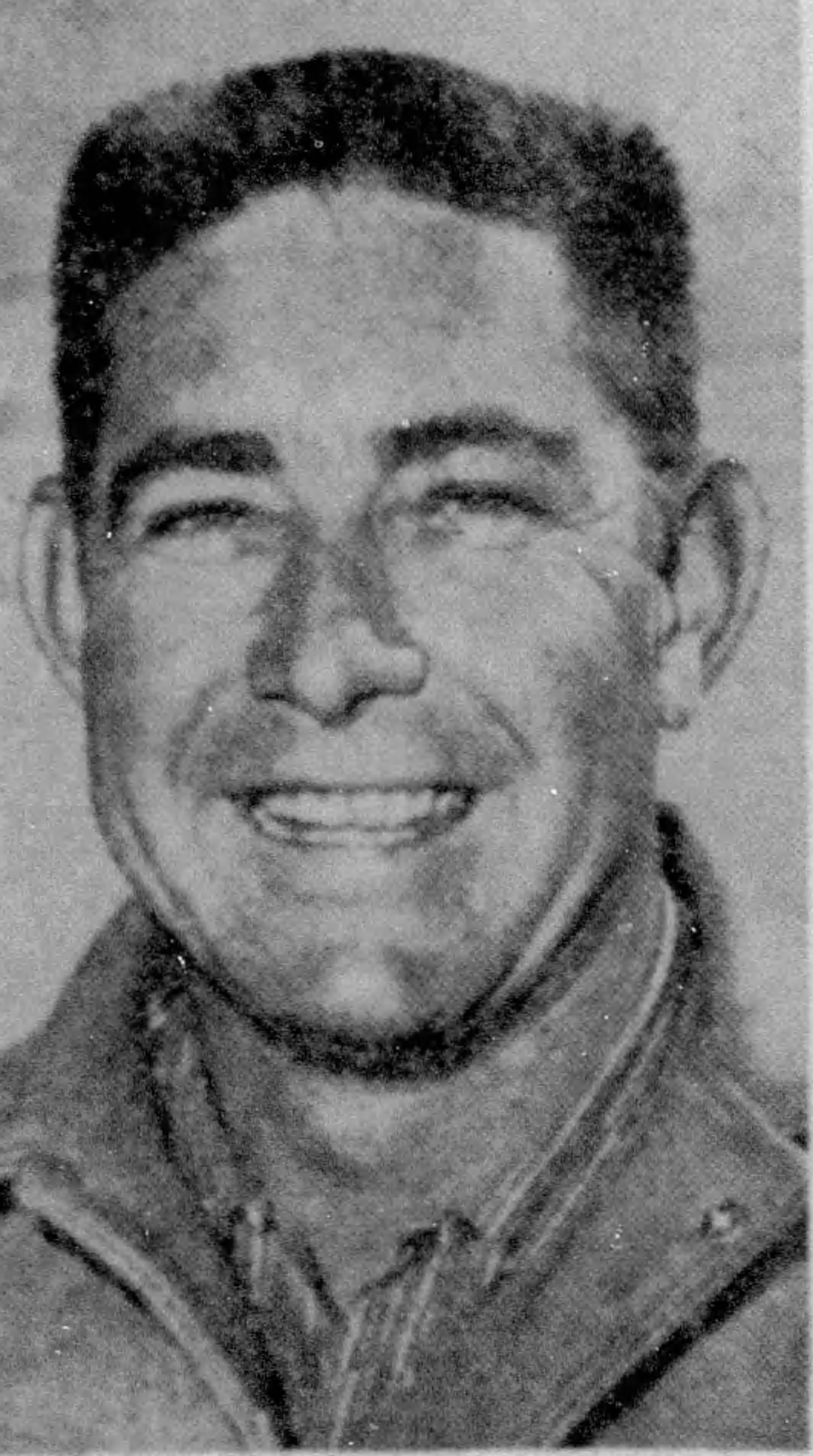
- Roberts c. 1964
- Born: Edward Glenn Roberts Jr. January 20, 1929; Daytona Beach, Florida, U.S.
- Died: July 2, 1964 (aged 35); Charlotte, North Carolina, U.S.
- Cause of death: Complications due to racing crash on May 24, 1964, during the 1964 World 600
- Achievements: Daytona 500 pole winner 1961, 1962, 1963; 1962 Daytona 500 winner 1958, 1963 Southern 500 winner
- Awards: 1957 Grand National Series Most Popular Driver; Named one of NASCAR's 50 Greatest Drivers (1998); International Motorsports Hall of Fame (1990); Motorsports Hall of Fame of America (1995); Florida Sports Hall of Fame; NASCAR Hall of Fame (2014); Named one of NASCAR's 75 Greatest Drivers (2023)

NASCAR Cup Series career
- 206 races run over 15 years
- Best finish: 2nd (1950)
- First race: 1950 (Daytona Beach)
- Last race: 1964 World 600 (Charlotte)
- First win: 1950 (Hillsboro)
- Last win: 1964 (Augusta)
| Wins | Top tens | Poles |
|---|---|---|
| 33 | 122 | 36 |
- Statistics up to date as of February 23, 2013.

Edward Glenn "Fireball" Roberts Jr. (January 20, 1929 – July 2, 1964) was an American stock car racer.

== Background ==
Roberts was born in Daytona Beach, Florida, and raised in Apopka, Florida, where he was interested in both auto racing and baseball. He was a pitcher for the Zellwood Mud Hens, an American Legion baseball team, where he earned the nickname "Fireball" because of his fastball. He enlisted with the United States Army Air Corps in 1945, but was discharged after basic training because of his asthma.

== Racing career ==
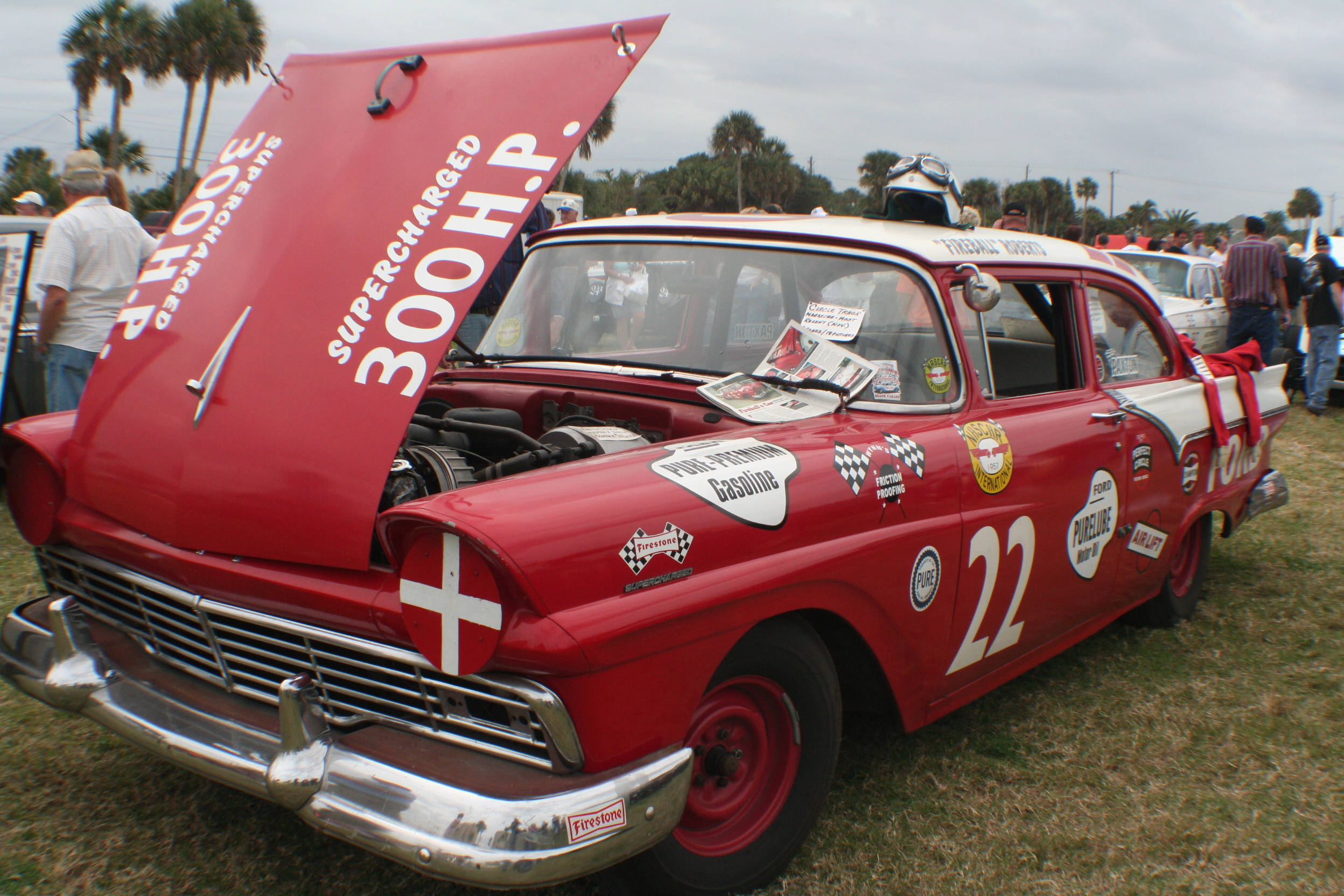
"Fireball" Roberts' 1957 NASCAR Ford

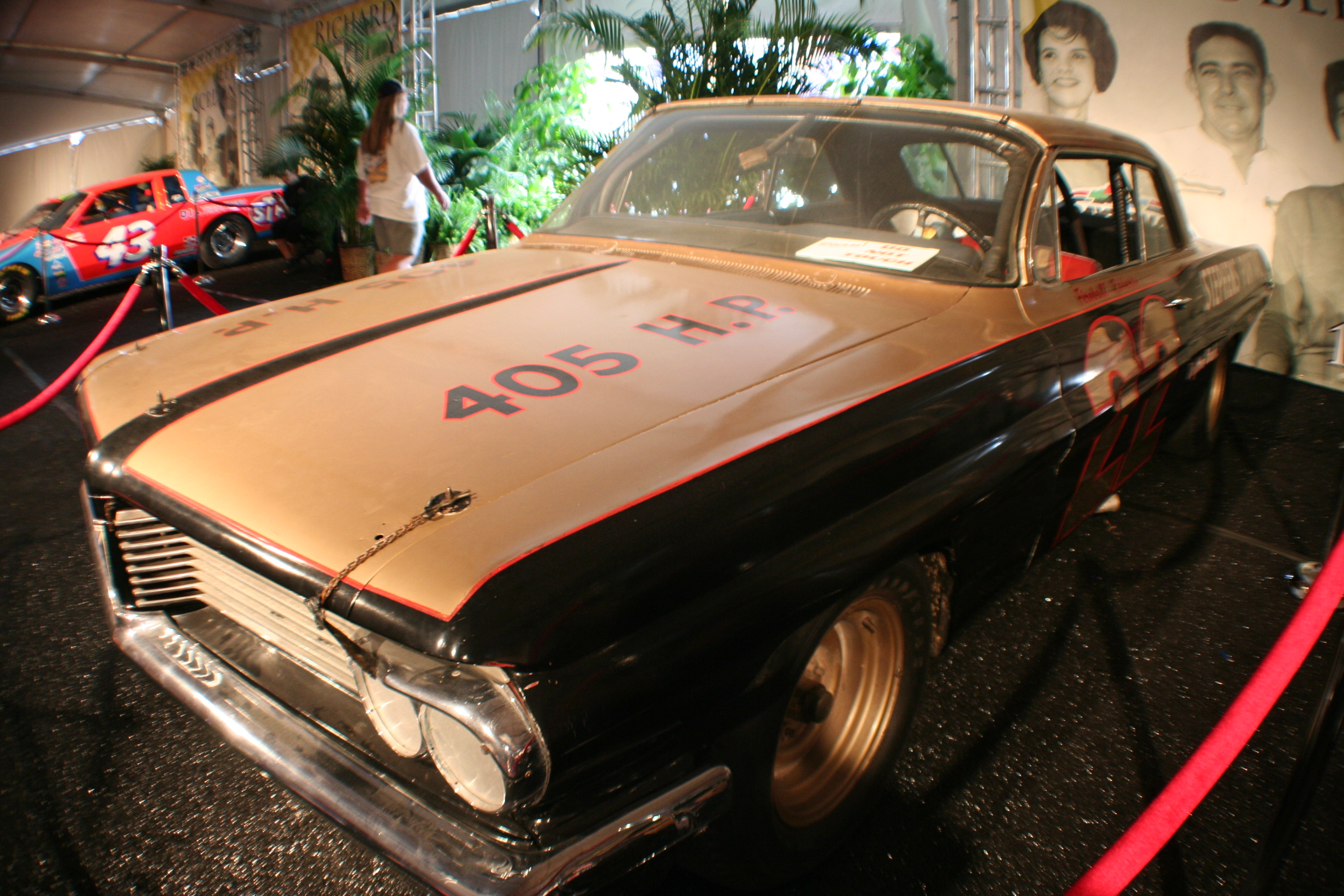
Roberts' 1962 Daytona 500-winning car

Roberts attended the University of Florida and raced on dirt tracks on weekends. In 1947, at the age of 18, he raced on the Daytona Beach Road Course at Daytona for the first time. He won a 150-mile race at Daytona Beach the following year. Roberts also competed in local stock and modified races at Florida tracks, such as Seminole Speedway.

"Fireball" Roberts continued to amass victories on the circuit, despite the changes in NASCAR, as it moved away from shorter dirt tracks to superspeedways in the 1950s and 1960s. Roberts won his first Southern 500 in 1958, driving a Chevrolet prepared by Paul McDuffie. In his 206 career NASCAR Grand National races, he won 33 times and had 32 poles. He finished in the top five 45% of the time, and in the top ten 59% of the time. He won both the Daytona 500 and Firecracker 250 events in 1962, driving a black and gold 1962 Pontiac built by car-builder legend Smokey Yunick. He also designed Augusta International Raceway, where he would last win.

Between 1962 and 1964, Roberts competed in multiple major sports-car races, including a class win at the 1962 24 Hours of Le Mans driving a Ferrari 250 GTO entered by North American Racing Team.

== Labor union ==
In 1961, Roberts, temporary president of the Federation of Professional Athletes (FPA), was in dispute with NASCAR president, Bill France, over the Teamsters' Union affiliate – the FPA – which Curtis Turner and he had helped organize, and which France was trying to disband. Unlike the banned Curtis Turner and Tim Flock, Roberts soon returned to the NASCAR fold.

== Death ==
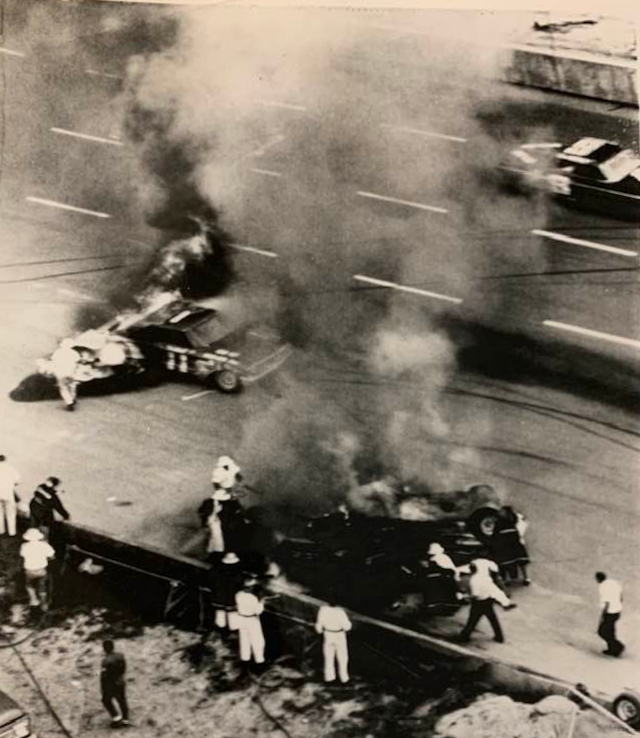
Roberts's car (bottom) and Jarett's car (left) after the crash

On May 24, 1964, at the World 600 in Charlotte, Roberts had qualified in 11th position and started in the middle of the pack. On lap seven, Ned Jarrett and Junior Johnson collided and spun out, and Roberts crashed trying to avoid them. Roberts' Ford slammed backward into the inside retaining wall, flipped over, and burst into flames. Witnesses at the track claimed they heard Roberts screaming, "Ned, help me", from inside his burning car after the wreck. Jarrett rushed to save Roberts as his car was engulfed by the flames. Roberts suffered second- and third-degree burns over 80% of his body and was airlifted to a hospital in critical condition. Although Roberts was thought to have had an allergic reaction to flame-retardant chemicals, he was secretly an asthmatic, and the chemicals affected his breathing.

Roberts was able to survive for several weeks, appearing as if he might pull through, but he took a turn for the worse on June 30. He contracted pneumonia and sepsis and had slipped into a coma by the next day. Roberts died from his burns on July 2.

Roberts' death, as well as the deaths of Eddie Sachs and Dave MacDonald at the Indianapolis 500, six days after Roberts' crash, led to an increase in research on fire-retardant uniforms. It also led to the development of the Firestone RaceSafe fuel cell. Modern race cars use a foam-filled fuel cell to prevent fuel spillage of the magnitude of Roberts' car. Also, fully fire-retardant coveralls were phased in, leading to mandatory Nomex racing suits. Roberts had lost his close friend, Joe Weatherly, in January 1964 at the MotorTrend 500, at Riverside, California.

Many sources reported that Roberts was planning to retire, since he had taken a public-relations position at the Falstaff Brewing Company and that the race in which he was killed was to be one of the final races of his career.

== Legacy ==
Despite having his career cut short and having never won a Grand National title, Roberts was named one of NASCAR's 50 Greatest Drivers. Other career accolades he won include induction into the International Motorsports Hall of Fame in 1990, and the Motorsports Hall of Fame of America in 1995. In 2000, the city of Concord, North Carolina, named a street near Charlotte Motor Speedway in his honor.

After Roberts' death, NASCAR mandated that all drivers wear flame-retardant coveralls while on track. They also instituted the five-point safety harness, and the special, contoured driver's seat, as requirements for all NASCAR vehicles.

The "Fireball Run", named for Roberts, was started in 2007. This streaming TV "adventurally" series, headquartered at Universal Studios in Florida, covers 40 teams as they compete in an eight-day, 2000-mile race and life-sized trivia game to raise money for missing and exploited children organizations. The Fireball Run is credited with assisting in the recovery of 38 missing children.

In 2013, Roberts was nominated for induction in the NASCAR Hall of Fame in Charlotte, North Carolina, and he was included in the 2014 induction ceremony.

== Motorsports career results ==
=== NASCAR ===
(key) (Bold – Pole position awarded by qualifying time. Italics – Pole position earned by points standings or practice time. * – Most laps led. ** – All laps led.)

==== Grand National Series ====
NASCAR Grand National Series results
| Year | Team | No. | Make | 1 | 2 | 3 | 4 | 5 | 6 | 7 | 8 | 9 | 10 | 11 | 12 | 13 | 14 | 15 | 16 | 17 | 18 | 19 | 20 | 21 | 22 | 23 | 24 | 25 | 26 | 27 | 28 | 29 | 30 | 31 | 32 | 33 | 34 | 35 | 36 | 37 | 38 | 39 | 40 | 41 | 42 | 43 | 44 | 45 | 46 | 47 | 48 | 49 | 50 | 51 | 52 | 53 | 54 | 55 | 56 | 57 | 58 | 59 | 60 | 61 | 62 | NGNC | Pts | Ref |
|---|---|---|---|---|---|---|---|---|---|---|---|---|---|---|---|---|---|---|---|---|---|---|---|---|---|---|---|---|---|---|---|---|---|---|---|---|---|---|---|---|---|---|---|---|---|---|---|---|---|---|---|---|---|---|---|---|---|---|---|---|---|---|---|---|---|---|---|---|
| 1950 | Jim Davis | 11 | Hudson | DAB; 33 | CLT | | | | | | | | | | | | | | | | | | | | | | | | | | | | | | | | | | | | | | | | | | | | | | | | | | | | | | | | | | | | | 2nd | 1848.5 | |
| 1950 | | 51 | Ford | | | LAN; 15 | MAR | CAN | VER | DSP | MCF | CLT | | | | | | | | | | | | | | | | | | | | | | | | | | | | | | | | | | | | | | | | | | | | | | | | | | | | | | 2nd | 1848.5 | |
| 1950 | Sam Rice | 71 | Olds | | | | | | | | | | HBO; 1 | DSP | | | | | | | | | | | | | | | | | | | | | | | | | | | | | | | | | | | | | | | | | | | | | | | | | | | | 2nd | 1848.5 | |
| 1950 | Sam Rice | 11 | Olds | | | | | | | | | | | | HAM; 2 | | | | | MAR; 6 | WIN | HBO; 21 | | | | | | | | | | | | | | | | | | | | | | | | | | | | | | | | | | | | | | | | | | | | 2nd | 1848.5 | |
| 1950 | Sam Rice | 82 | Olds | | | | | | | | | | | | | DAR; 2 | LAN; 3 | **NWS**; 16 | VER | | | | | | | | | | | | | | | | | | | | | | | | | | | | | | | | | | | | | | | | | | | | | | | 2nd | 1848.5 | |
| 1951 | | 85 | Plymouth | DAB; 45 | | | | | | | | | | | | | | | | | | | | | | | | | | | | | | | | | | | | | | | | | | | | | | | | | | | | | | | | | | | | | | 12th | 930 | |
| 1951 | Sam Rice | 11 | Olds | | CLT; 8 | NMO; 19 | GAR | HBO; 14 | ASF | NWS; 38 | MAR; 32 | CAN | CLS; 24 | CLB | DSP | GAR | GRS | BAI | HEI | AWS | MCF | ALS | MSF | FMS | MOR | ABS | | | | | | | | | | | | | | | | | | | | | | | | | | | | | | | | | | | | | | | | 12th | 930 | |
| 1951 | Saverance Motors | 11 | Ford | | | | | | | | | | | | | | | | | | | | | | | | DAR; 5 | CLB; 2 | CCS | LAN | CLT | DSP | WIL | HBO | TPN | PGS | MAR | OAK | NWS | HMS | JSP | ATL | GAR | NMO | | | | | | | | | | | | | | | | | | | | | | 12th | 930 | |
| 1952 | Saverance Motors | 11 | Ford | PBS | DAB; 52 | JSP; 24 | NWS | MAR | CLB; 21 | ATL | CCS | LAN | **DAR**; 8 | DSP | CAN | HAY | FMS | HBO | CLT | MSF | NIF | OSW | MON | MOR | PPS | MCF | AWS | DAR; 49 | CCS | LAN | DSP | WIL; 16 | HBO | MAR | NWS | | | | | | | | | | | | | | | | | | | | | | | | | | | | | | | 59th | - | |
| 1952 | Bill Snowden | 16 | Hudson | | | | | | | | | | | | | | | | | | | | | | | | | | | | | | | | | ATL; 18 | PBS | | | | | | | | | | | | | | | | | | | | | | | | | | | | | 59th | - | |
| 1953 | Saverance Motors | 11 | Ford | PBS | DAB | HAR | NWS | CLT | RCH | CCS | LAN | CLB | HCY | MAR | PMS | RSP; 39 | LOU | FFS | LAN | TCS | WIL | MCF | PIF | MOR | ATL | RVS | LCF | DAV | HBO | AWS | PAS | HCY | | | | | | | | | | | | | | | | | | | | | | | | | | | | | | | | | | 132nd | 84 | |
| 1953 | Leland Colvin | 11 | Olds | | | | | | | | | | | | | | | | | | | | | | | | | | | | | | DAR; 45 | CCS | LAN | BLF | WIL | NWS | MAR | ATL | | | | | | | | | | | | | | | | | | | | | | | | | | 132nd | 84 | |
| 1954 | Leland Colvin | 25 | Olds | PBS | DAB; 8 | JSP | ATL; 22 | OSP | OAK | NWS | HBO | CCS | LAN | WIL | MAR | SHA | RSP; 20 | CLT | GAR | CLB; 13 | LND | HCY | MCF | WGS | PIF | AWS | SFS | GRS | MOR | OAK | CLT | SAN | COR | DAR; 7 | CCS | CLT | LAN | MAS | MAR | NWS | | | | | | | | | | | | | | | | | | | | | | | | | | 22nd | 1648 | |
| 1955 | Bob Fish | M-1 | Buick | TCS | PBS | JSP | DAB; 48 | OSP | CLB | HBO | NWS | MGY | LAN | CLT | HCY | ASF | TUS | MAR | RCH | NCF | FOR | LIN | MCF | FON | AIR | CLT | PIF | CLB | AWS | MOR | ALS | NYF | SAN | CLT | FOR | MAS | RSP | **DAR**; 66 | MGY | LAN | RSP | GPS | MAS | CLB | MAR | LVP | NWS | HBO | | | | | | | | | | | | | | | | | | 201st | - | |
| 1956 | DePaolo Engineering | 22 | Ford | HCY | CLT | WSS | PBS | ASF | DAB; 59 | PBS; 5 | WIL | ATL | NWS; 25 | LAN; 31 | RCH; 18 | CLB | CON | GPS | HCY | HBO; 4 | MAR; 16 | LIN | CLT | POR | EUR | NYF | MER | MAS; 21 | **CLT**; 4 | MCF | POR | **AWS**; 18 | RSP; 1* | **PIF**; 2 | CSF | CHI; 1 | CCF; 4 | MGY; 10 | OKL; 3 | ROA; 3 | OBS; 4 | | NOR; 8 | PIF; 8 | MYB; 1 | POR | DAR; 51 | CSH; 4 | CLT; 19 | LAN; 17 | POR | CLB; 4 | HBO; 1 | NWP; 1 | CLT; 10 | CCF; 12 | MAR; 5 | HCY | WIL; 4 | | | | | | | 7th | 5794 | |
| 1956 | DePaolo Engineering | 12 | Ford | | | | | | | | | | | | | | | | | | | | | | | | | | | | | | | | | | | | | | | SAN; 8 | | | | | | | | | | | | | | | | | | | | | | | | 7th | 5794 | |
| 1957 | DePaolo Engineering | 22 | Ford | WSS; 2 | CON | TIC; 1* | DAB; 37 | CON; 4 | **WIL**; 9 | **HBO**; 17 | AWS; 13 | **NWS**; 1** | LAN; 1* | CLT; 1 | PIF; 2 | GBF; 5 | POR | CCF; 1 | RCH; 2* | MAR; 9 | POR | EUR | LIN; 2 | LCS; 14 | ASP | | | | | | | | | | | | | | | | | | | | | | | | | | | | | | | | | | | | | | | | | 6th | 8268 | |
| 1957 | Roberts Racing | 22 | Ford | | | | | | | | | | | | | | | | | | | | | | | NWP; 1 | CLB; 16 | CPS | PIF; 9 | JAC; 12 | | | | | HCY; 5 | NOR; 21 | LCS; 7 | GLN; 2 | KPC | LIN; 31 | OBS; 6 | MYB; 3* | DAR; 33 | NYF; 5 | AWS; 10 | CSF | SCF | LAN; 17* | CLB; 15 | CCF; 14 | CLT; 2 | | NBR; 1* | CON; 1* | **NWS**; 21* | GBF | | | | | | | | | | 6th | 8268 | |
| 1957 | Roberts Racing | 11 | Ford | | | | | | | | | | | | | | | | | | | | | | | | | | | | RSP; 13 | | MAS; 3 | POR | | | | | | | | | | | | | | | | | | | | | | | | | | | | | | | | 6th | 8268 | |
| 1957 | Dick Beaty | 34 | Ford | | | | | | | | | | | | | | | | | | | | | | | | | | | | | CLT; 5 | | | | | | | | | | | | | | | | | | | | | | | | | | | | | | | | | | 6th | 8268 | |
| 1957 | Buck Baker Racing | 7 | Chevy | | | | | | | | | | | | | | | | | | | | | | | | | | | | | | | | | | | | | | | | | | | | | | | | | MAR; 12 | | | | | | | | | | | | | | 6th | 8268 | |
| 1958 | Bob Fish | M-1 | Buick | FAY | DAB; 9 | CON | FAY | WIL | HBO | FAY | CLB | PIF | | | | | | | | | | | | | | | | | | | | | | | | | | | | | | | | | | | | | | | | | | | | | | | | | | | | | | 11th | 4420 | |
| 1958 | Beau Morgan | 494 | Ford | | | | | | | | | | ATL; 3 | CLT | MAR | ODS | OBS | GPS | GBF | STR | NWS | BGS | | | | | | | | | | | | | | | | | | | | | | | | | | | | | | | | | | | | | | | | | | | | 11th | 4420 | |
| 1958 | Frank Strickland | 22 | Chevy | | | | | | | | | | | | | | | | | | | | TRN; 1* | RSD | CLB | NBS | REF | LIN | HCY | AWS | RSP; 1* | MCC | SLS | TOR | BUF | MCF | BEL | BRR | CLB | NSV; 30 | AWS; 1 | BGS | MBS | DAR; 1* | CLT | BIR; 1 | CSF | GAF | RCH | HBO | SAS | MAR; 1* | NWS | ATL; 2 | | | | | | | | | | | | 11th | 4420 | |
| 1959 | Jim Stephens | 3 | Pontiac | FAY | **DAY**; 33 | DAY; 34 | HBO | CON | | | | | | | | | | | | | | | | | | | | | **DAY**; 1* | HEI | CLT | MBS | CLT | NSV | AWS | BGS | GPS | CLB | **DAR**; 7 | HCY | RCH | CSF | HBO | | | | | | | | | | | | | | | | | | | | | | | 16th | 3676 | |
| 1959 | Jim Stephens | 22 | Chevy | | | | | | ATL; 8 | WIL | BGS | CLB | NWS | REF | HCY | | | | | | | | | | | | | | | | | | | | | | | | | | | | | | | | | | | | | | | | | | | | | | | | | | | 16th | 3676 | |
| 1959 | E. C. Wilson | 48 | Chevy | | | | | | | | | | | | | MAR; 25 | TRN | CLT | NSV | ASP | PIF | GPS | | | | | | | | | | | | | | | | | | | | | | | | | | | | | | | | | | | | | | | | | | | | 16th | 3676 | |
| 1959 | Buck Baker Racing | 88 | Chevy | | | | | | | | | | | | | | | | | | | | ATL; 6 | CLB | WIL | RCH | BGS | AWS | | | | | | | | | | | | | | | | | | | | | | | | | | | | | | | | | | | | | | 16th | 3676 | |
| 1959 | Lynton Tyson | 88 | Chevy | | | | | | | | | | | | | | | | | | | | | | | | | | | | | | | | | | | | | | | | | MAR; 30 | AWS | NWS | CON | | | | | | | | | | | | | | | | | | | 16th | 3676 | |
| 1960 | John Hines | 22 | Pontiac | CLT | CLB | DAY; 1** | DAY | DAY; 57 | CLT | NWS | PHO | CLB | MAR | HCY | WIL | BGS | GPS | AWS | **DAR**; 20 | PIF | HBO | RCH | HMS | **CLT**; 35 | BGS | DAY; 31 | HEI | MAB | MBS | **ATL**; 1 | BIR | NSV | AWS | PIF | CLB | SBO | BGS | **DAR**; 9 | HCY | CSF | GSP | HBO | MAR | NWS | **CLT**; 23* | RCH | **ATL**; 34 | | | | | | | | | | | | | | | | | | | 29th | 4700 | |
| 1961 | Smokey Yunick | 22 | Pontiac | CLT | JSP | **DAY**; 1* | DAY | **DAY**; 20* | PIF | AWS | | ATL; 42 | GPS | HBO | BGS | MAR | NWS; 4 | CLB | HCY | RCH | | DAR; 5* | | | | | CLT; 2 | PIF | BIR | GPS | BGS | NOR | HAS | STR | **DAY**; 5* | **ATL**; 12 | CLB | | BRI; 2 | NSV | BGS | | | | DAR; 2* | HCY | RCH | CSF | ATL; 3 | | | CLT; 29* | | | | | | | | | | | | | | 5th | 17600 | |
| 1961 | Smokey Yunick | 75 | Pontiac | | | | | | | | HMS; 1** | | | | | | | | | | MAR; 3 | | CLT; 6 | CLT | RSD | ASP | | | | | | | | | | | | | | | | | | | | | | | | | | | | | | | | | | | | | | | | 5th | 17600 | |
| 1961 | Rex Lovette | 127 | Pontiac | | | | | | | | | | | | | | | | | | | | | | | | | | | | | | | | | | | MBS; 21 | | | | | | | | | | | | | | | | | | | | | | | | | | | | 5th | 17600 | |
| 1961 | B. G. Holloway | 59 | Pontiac | | | | | | | | | | | | | | | | | | | | | | | | | | | | | | | | | | | | | | | AWS; 31 | RCH | SBO | | | | | | | | | | | | | | | | | | | | | | 5th | 17600 | |
| 1961 | Cotton Owens | 6 | Pontiac | | | | | | | | | | | | | | | | | | | | | | | | | | | | | | | | | | | | | | | | | | | | | | | MAR; 4 | | | | | | | | | | | | | | | | 5th | 17600 | |
| 1961 | Bud Moore Engineering | 18 | Pontiac | | | | | | | | | | | | | | | | | | | | | | | | | | | | | | | | | | | | | | | | | | | | | | | | NWS; 2 | | | | | | | | | | | | | | | 5th | 17600 | |
| 1961 | Rex Lovette | 22 | Pontiac | | | | | | | | | | | | | | | | | | | | | | | | | | | | | | | | | | | | | | | | | | | | | | | | | | BRI; 26 | GPS; 16 | HBO; 5 | | | | | | | | | | | 5th | 17600 | |
| 1962 | Jim Stephens | 22 | Pontiac | CON | AWS | **DAY**; 1* | DAY | **DAY**; 1* | CON | AWS | SVH | HBO | RCH; 5 | CLB | NWS; 4 | GPS | MBS | MAR; 18* | BGS | **BRI**; 2 | RCH | HCY | CON | DAR; 32 | PIF | **CLT**; 9 | ATL; 4 | BGS | AUG | RCH | SBO | DAY; 1 | CLB | ASH | GPS | AUG | SVH | MBS | **BRI**; 36 | CHT; 2 | NSV; 19 | HUN | AWS | STR | BGS | PIF | VAL | **DAR**; 36 | HCY | RCH; 17 | DTS | AUG | **MAR**; 7 | NWS; 29 | **CLT**; 2 | **ATL**; 10* | | | | | | | | | | 8th | 16380 | |
| 1963 | Banjo Matthews | 22 | Pontiac | BIR | GGS; 20 | THS | RSD; 4 | DAY; 6 | DAY | DAY; 21 | PIF | AWS | HBO | ATL; 2 | HCY | | | | | | | | | | | | | | | | | | | | | | | | | | | | | | | | | | | | | | | | | | | | | | | | | | | 5th | 22642 | |
| 1963 | Holman-Moody | 22 | Ford | | | | | | | | | | | | | BRI; 1* | AUG | RCH; 23 | GPS | SBO | BGS | MAR; 28 | NWS | CLB | THS | DAR; 2 | ODS | RCH | CLT; 10 | BIR | ATL; 31 | DAY; 1* | MBS | SVH | DTS | BGS | ASH | OBS; 1 | BRR; 5 | BRI; 29 | GPS | NSV | CLB | AWS | PIF | BGS | ONA | DAR; 1 | HCY | RCH | MAR; 7 | DTS | NWS; 4* | THS | CLT; 4 | SBO | HBO | RSD; 4 | | | | | | | | 5th | 22642 | |
| 1964 | Holman-Moody | 22 | Ford | CON | AUG; 1 | JSP | SVH | RSD; 3 | DAY; 7 | DAY | DAY; 37 | RCH | BRI; 2 | GPS | BGS | ATL; 20 | AWS | HBO | PIF | CLB | NWS; 31 | MAR; 5 | SVH | DAR; 2 | LGY | HCY | SBO | CLT; 35 | GPS | ASH | ATL | CON | NSV | CHT | BIR | VAL | PIF | DAY | ODS | OBS | BRR | ISP | GLN | LIN | BRI | NSV | MBS | AWS | DTS | ONA | CLB | BGS | STR | DAR | HCY | RCH | ODS | HBO | MAR | SVH | NWS | CLT | HAR | AUG | JAC | 27th | 9900 | |

===== Daytona 500 =====
| Year | Team | Manufacturer | Start | Finish |
|---|---|---|---|---|
| 1959 | Jim Stephens | Pontiac | 46 | 45 |
| 1960 | John Hines | Pontiac | 3 | 57 |
| 1961 | Smokey Yunick | Pontiac | **1** | 20* |
| 1962 | Jim Stephens | Pontiac | **1** | **1*** |
| 1963 | Banjo Matthews | Pontiac | **1** | 21 |
| 1964 | Holman-Moody | Ford | 15 | 37 |

=== 24 Hours of Le Mans results ===
| Year | Team | Co-Driver | Car | Class | Laps | Pos. | Class Pos. |
|---|---|---|---|---|---|---|---|
| 1962 | (United States) North American Racing Team | (United States) Bob Grossman | Ferrari 250 GTO | E 3.0 | 297 | 6th | **1st** |

Achievements
| Preceded by Marvin Panch | Daytona 500 Winner; 1962 | Succeeded by Tiny Lund |
