= 1960 Southern 500 =

Race details
- Race 35 of 44 in the 1960 NASCAR Grand National Series season
- 1960 Southern 500 program cover
- Date: September 5, 1960
- Location: Darlington Raceway, Darlington, South Carolina
- Course: Permanent racing facility
- Course length: 1.375 miles (2.213 km)
- Distance: 364 laps, 500.5 mi (805.477 km)
- Weather: Temperatures of 88 °F (31 °C); wind speeds of 8.9 miles per hour (14.3 km/h)
- Average speed: 105.901 miles per hour (170.431 km/h)
- Attendance: 80,000

Pole position
Driver	Fireball Roberts	Jim Stephens

Most laps led
Driver	Buck Baker	Buck Baker
- Laps: 175

Winner
No. 47	Buck Baker	Buck Baker

The 1960 Southern 500, the 11th running of the event, was a NASCAR Grand National Series event that was held on September 5, 1960, at Darlington Raceway in Darlington, South Carolina. Contested over 364 laps on the 1.375-mile (2.213-kilometre) egg-shaped oval, it was the 35th race of the 1960 NASCAR Grand National Series season.

The race is known as one of the deadliest Southern 500s in history. On lap 95, race leader Bobby Johns and Roy Tyner locked bumpers, and both crashed on pit road. The crash would kill two mechanics and a NASCAR official.

== Background ==
Darlington Raceway, nicknamed by many NASCAR fans and drivers as "The Lady in Black" or "The Track Too Tough to Tame" and advertised as a "NASCAR Tradition", is a race track built for NASCAR racing located near Darlington, South Carolina. It is of a unique, somewhat egg-shaped design, an oval with the ends of very different configurations, a condition which supposedly arose from the proximity of one end of the track to a minnow pond the owner refused to relocate. This situation makes it very challenging for the crews to set up their cars' handling in a way that will be effective at both ends.

The track is a four-turn 1.375-mile (2.213-kilometre) oval. The track's first two turns are banked at twenty-five degrees, while the final two turns are banked two degrees lower at twenty-three degrees. The front stretch (the location of the finish line) and the back stretch is banked at six degrees. Darlington Raceway can seat up to 60,000 people.

Darlington has something of a legendary quality among drivers and older fans; this is probably due to its long track length relative to other NASCAR speedways of its era and hence the first venue where many of them became cognizant of the truly high speeds that stock cars could achieve on a long track. The track allegedly earned the moniker The Lady in Black because the night before the race the track maintenance crew would cover the entire track with fresh asphalt sealant, in the early years of the speedway, thus making the racing surface dark black. Darlington is also known as "The Track Too Tough to Tame" because drivers can run lap after lap without a problem and then bounce off of the wall the following lap. Racers will frequently explain that they have to race the racetrack, not their competition. Drivers hitting the wall are considered to have received their "Darlington Stripe" thanks to the missing paint on the right side of the car.

== Race recap ==
It would take 4 hours and 43 minutes to complete the race.

On lap 95, race leader Bobby Johns and Roy Tyner locked bumpers, and both crashed on pit road. There was no wall separating pit lane from the circuit at the time, as was the case at most motor racing circuits (Indianapolis had added a barrier separating pit lane from the circuit in 1957, and Daytona was built with an entire bend and grass separating pit lane from the circuit) The crash would kill two mechanics and a NASCAR official. Johns's car crashed into an observation post, the pit road retaining wall, and then swiped the pit area where mechanics had just serviced Joe Lee Johnson's car. Paul McDuffie and Charles Sweatland, both mechanics for Joe Lee Johnson's team, were killed. A third, NASCAR official Joe Taylor, was also killed. Three more mechanics and a spectator were injured. Johns would manage to walk away from the incident. Joe Lee Johnson would withdraw from the race.

Race leader Buck Baker, entering Turn 4 on Lap 364, the final lap, had his right rear tire blow out. Meanwhile, second place Rex White was given an early white flag, and Baker had the white flag waved to him twice as he crossed the line with his blown tire. Baker limped his stricken car around the track to complete one more lap, by which time White had crossed the line and been given the checkered flag. In an era before transponder-based timing and scoring implemented in 1993, NASCAR checked the score cards of all cars after the race. Officials would discover that White had accidentally been awarded an extra lap, and that Baker was forced to run an extra lap. Baker would eventually be declared the winner.

== Race results ==
POS	ST	#	DRIVER	SPONSOR / OWNER	CAR	LAPS	MONEY	STATUS	LED
1	2	47	Buck Baker	Boomershine Pontiac Dealers (Jack Smith)	'60 Pontiac	364	19900	running	175
2	7	4	Rex White	Piedmont / Friendly (Rex White)	'60 Chevrolet	364	9780	running	4
3	3	44	Jim Paschal	South Plymouth (Petty Enterprises)	'60 Plymouth	362	5595	running	0
4	16	85	Emanuel Zervakis	Monroe Shook	'60 Chevrolet	362	3125	running	0
5	20	11	Ned Jarrett	Courtesy (Ned Jarrett)	'60 Ford	362	2000	running	0
6	8	43	Richard Petty	South Plymouth (Petty Enterprises)	'60 Plymouth	361	2575	running	106
7	17	94	Banjo Matthews	Banjo Matthews	'60 Ford	361	1255	running	0
8	21	73	Johnny Beauchamp	Dale Swanson	'60 Chevrolet	358	1025	running	0
9	1	22	Fireball Roberts	John Hines	'60 Pontiac	353	2175	axle	53
10	34	23	Doug Yates	Raeford Johnson	'59 Plymouth	353	775	running	0
11	24	77	Marvin Panch	Billie Ridgeway (W.J. Ridgeway)	'60 Ford	351	700	running	0
12	26	70	Elmo Henderson	W.H. Watson	'58 Pontiac	338	600	running	0
13	39	38	Clem Proctor	Charlie Chapman	'60 Ford	338	500	running	0
14	36	1	Paul Lewis	Faircloth (Jess Potter)	'60 Chevrolet	335	450	engine	0
15	29	81	Shorty Rollins	Shorty Rollins	'60 Ford	331	500	running	0
16	35	60	Jim Whitman	Polytronics Lab (Dick Stanley)	'60 Dodge	320	350	engine	0
17	41	74	L.D. Austin	L.D. Austin	'58 Chevrolet	310	300	running	0
18	37	19	Herman Beam	Carter Country Ford (Herman Beam)	'60 Ford	305	250	running	0
19	32	45	Tiny Lund	Bill Gazaway	'59 Oldsmobile	304	250	crash	0
20	43	83	Curtis Crider	Curtis Crider	'58 Ford	304	250	running	0
21	4	12	Joe Weatherly	Holman-Moody Racing	'60 Ford	303	200	crash	0
22	44	20	G.C. Spencer	Spook Crawford	'58 Ford	301	200	running	0
23	25	61	Jimmy Thompson	Doc White	'59 T-Bird	278	200	axle	0
24	6	6	Cotton Owens	Hedges Pontiac (Cotton Owens)	'60 Pontiac	277	510	axle	9
25	45	10	T.C. Hunt	Fred Wheat	'60 Plymouth	260	200	crash	0
26	30	99	Wilbur Rakestraw	Talmadge Cochrane	'60 Ford	217	200	axle	0
27	22	67	David Pearson	David Pearson	'59 Chevrolet	214	200	axle	0
28	14	28	Fred Lorenzen	Rupert Safety Belt (Fred Lorenzen)	'60 Ford	188	250	engine	0
29	42	16	Steve McGrath	Happy Steigel	'59 Pontiac	188	200	engine	0
30	9	42	Lee Petty	South Plymouth (Petty Enterprises)	'60 Plymouth	188	470	crash	13
31	33	39	Herb Tillman	Ralph Stark	'60 Chevrolet	180	200	rear end	0
32	38	33	Reb Wickersham	Sons of Confederate Veterans (Reb Wickersham)	'60 Oldsmobile	163	200	axle	0
33	46	54	Jimmy Pardue	Lowe's (Eb Clifton)	'59 Dodge	143	200	oil pressure	0
34	23	87	Buddy Baker	Don Allen Chevrolet (Buck Baker)	'60 Chevrolet	136	200	fuel pump	0
35	47	96	Gene White		'60 Chevrolet	134	200	engine	0
36	28	7	Jim Reed	Jim Reed	'60 Chevrolet	130	200	a frame	0
37	13	69	Johnny Allen	Hanley Dawson	'60 Chevrolet	125	220	engine	0
38	12	59	Tom Pistone	Thor (W.T. Coppedge)	'60 Chevrolet	115	230	engine	0
39	19	90	Speedy Thompson	Junie Donlavey	'60 Ford	110	250	engine	0
40	5	5	Bobby Johns	Justus Pontiac (Cotton Owens)	'60 Pontiac	95	210	crash	4
41	11	89	Joe Lee Johnson	Paul McDuffie	'60 Chevrolet	95	550	withdrew	0
42	40	9	Roy Tyner	Roy Tyner	'59 Oldsmobile	86	200	crash	0
43	15	2	Possum Jones	Tom Daniels	'60 Chevrolet	76	200	c pulley	0
44	31	79	Johnny Miller	Robert Ramey	'60 Ford	26	200	crash	0
45	18	92	Elmo Langley	Gerald Duke	'59 T-Bird	25	220	crash	0
46	27	64	Bunkie Blackburn	Spook Crawford	'60 Ford	24	200	crash	0
47	10	27	Junior Johnson	Daytona Kennel / Holly Farms Poultry (John Masoni)	'60 Chevrolet	17	200	engine	0
48	48	35	E.J. Trivette	M.J. Black	'59 Plymouth	1	200	handling	0
