= Joe Lee Johnson =

American racing driver (1929–2005)

- Born: September 11, 1929
- Died: May 26, 2005 (aged 75)
- Cause of death: Cancer
- Awards: 1959 NASCAR Convertible Division champion

NASCAR Cup Series career
- 55 races run over 7 years
- Best finish: 13th (1960)
- First race: 1957 Daytona Beach Road Course
- Last race: 1962 Nashville 500 (Nashville)
- First win: 1959 Nashville 300 (Nashville)
- Last win: 1960 World 600 (Charlotte)
Wins	Top tens	Poles
2	20	0

NASCAR Convertible Division career
- 16 races run over 2 years
- Best finish: 1st (1959)
- First race: 1958 Race #11 (Lakewood)
- Last race: 1959 Race #15 (Charlotte Fairgrounds)
- First win: 1959 Race #2 (Fayetteville)
- Last win: 1959 Race #3 (Richmond)
Wins	Top tens	Poles
2	10	0

Joe Lee Johnson (September 11, 1929 – May 26, 2005) was an American professional NASCAR Grand National Series driver who won the inaugural World 600 in 1960. He was also the 1959 NASCAR Convertible Division champion. He made his last NASCAR start in 1962. He was the owner of the Cleveland Speedway in Cleveland, Tennessee. He is of no relation to Junior Johnson or Jimmie Johnson.
