= 1959 Daytona 500 =

Auto race held at Daytona International Speedway in 1959

Race details
- Race 2 of 44 in the 1959 NASCAR Grand National Series
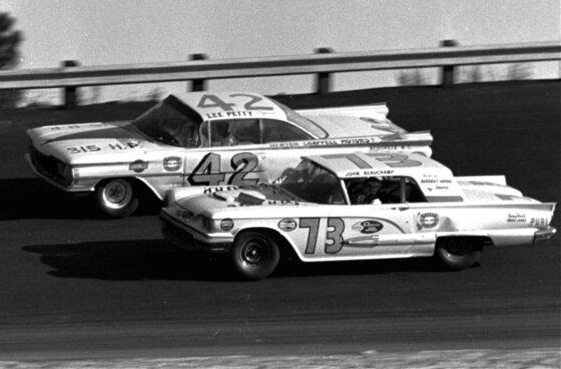
- Lee Petty No. 42 and Johnny Beauchamp No. 73 battle on the last lap of the 1959 Daytona 500.
- Date: February 22, 1959
- Official name: First 500 Mile NASCAR International Sweepstakes at Daytona
- Location: Daytona International Speedway; Daytona Beach, Florida, U.S.
- Course: Permanent racing facility 2.5 mi (4.023 km)
- Distance: 200 laps, 500 mi (800 km)
- Weather: Chilly with temperatures reaching up to 68 °F (20 °C); wind speeds up to 15 miles per hour (24 km/h)
- Average speed: 135.521 mph (218.100 km/h)
- Attendance: 41,921

Pole position
Driver	Bob Welborn	
- Time: 140.121 mph (225.503 km/h)

Qualifying race winners
Duel 1 Winner	Bob Welborn (Hardtop)	
Duel 2 Winner	Shorty Rollins (Convertible)	

Most laps led
Driver	Jack Smith	
- Laps: 57

Winner
No. 42	Lee Petty	Petty Enterprises

Television in the United States
- Network: Not televised

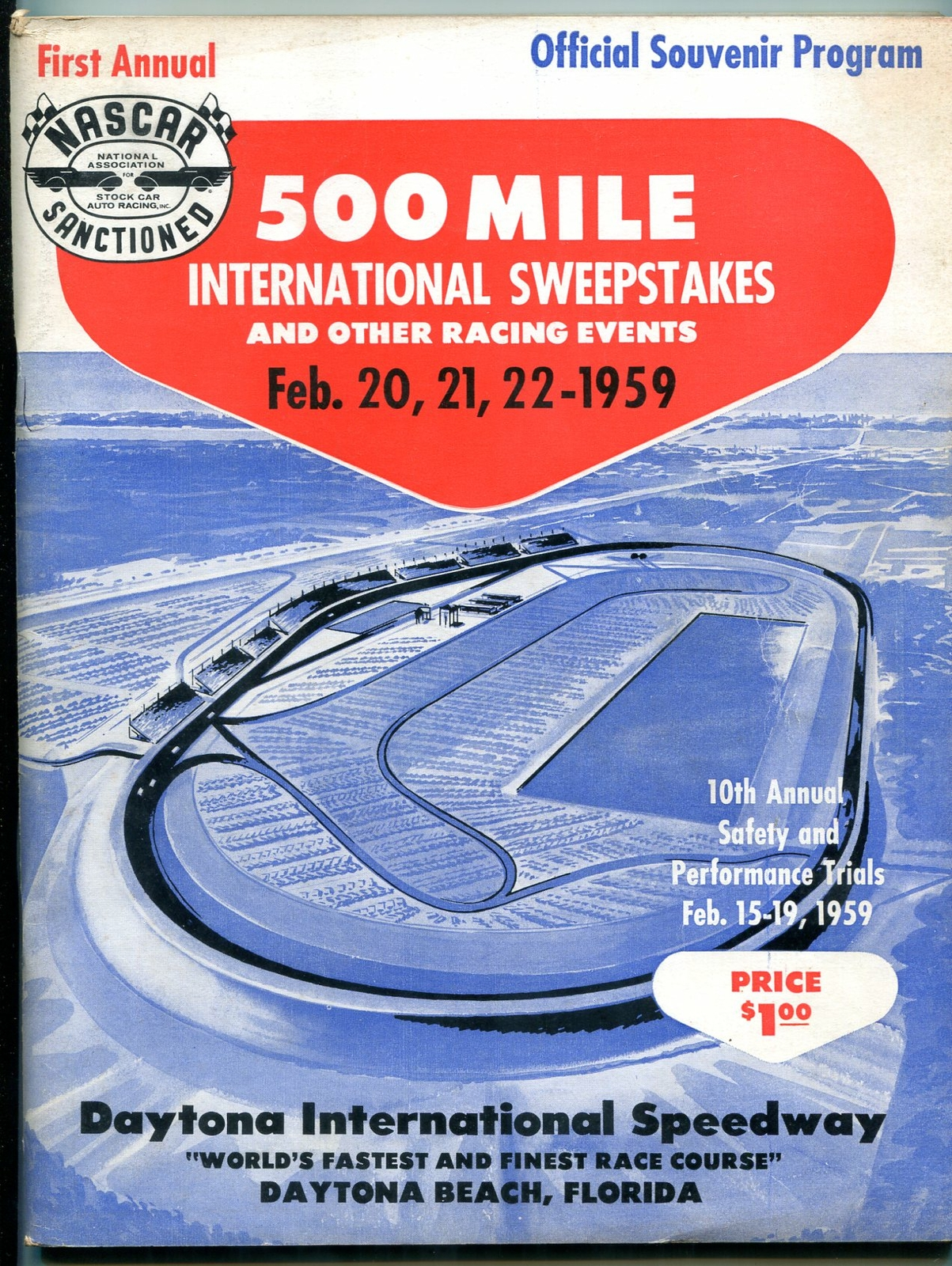
Program promoting the 1959 Daytona 500.

The 1959 First 500 Mile NASCAR International Sweepstakes at Daytona (now known as the 1959 Inaugural Daytona 500) was the second race of the 1959 NASCAR Grand National Series season. It was held on February 22, 1959, in front of 41,921 spectators. It was the first race held at the 2.5 miles (4.0 km) Daytona International Speedway.

== Background ==
Map of Daytona International Speedway, the track where the race was held.

Daytona International Speedway is a race track in Daytona Beach, Florida that was one of the first superspeedways to hold NASCAR races. The standard track at Daytona is a four-turn superspeedway that is 2.5 miles (4.0 km) long. The track also features two other layouts that utilize portions of the primary high speed tri-oval, such as a 3.56-mile (5.73 km) sports car course and a 2.95-mile (4.75 km) motorcycle course. The track's 180-acre (73 ha) infield includes the 29-acre (12 ha) Lake Lloyd. The speedway is currently owned and operated by the International Speedway Corporation.

The track was built by NASCAR founder Bill France Sr. to host racing that was being held at the former Daytona Beach and Road Course and opened with the first Daytona 500 in 1959.

The Daytona 500 is regarded as the most important and prestigious race on the NASCAR calendar. It is also the series' first race of the year; this phenomenon is virtually unique in sports, which tend to have championships or other major events at the end of the season rather than the start. Since 1995, U.S. television ratings for the Daytona 500 have been the highest for any auto race of the year, surpassing the traditional leader, the Indianapolis 500 which in turn greatly surpasses the Daytona 500 in in-track attendance and international viewing. The 2006 Daytona 500 attracted the sixth largest average live global TV audience of any sporting event that year with 20 million viewers.

== Race report ==
=== Qualifying ===
Cotton Owens had the fastest qualifying lap, at 143.198 mph (230.455 km/h). The race had one qualifying race for Convertibles and one for the hardtop Grand National cars. Bob Welborn, winner of the 100-mile (160 km) Grand National qualifying race earlier in the week, started on the pole position. Shorty Rollins won the Convertible qualifying race and started second. Twenty of the 59 cars in the Daytona 500 were convertibles.

On February 21st, there was a Consolation race where the winner would be added to the field. Jack Smith was the winner.

=== Race ===
There were no caution periods in the race; making it one of the few "clean races" in NASCAR history, though it would occur in three of the first four Daytona 500s, as the Daytona 500 also went caution-free in both 1961 and 1962. This would be repeated ten years later with the 1969 Motor Trend 500.

On the morning of the race, Bob Welborn's chief mechanic, Paul McDuffie, discovered a rocker arm bolt off-center and knew the engine wouldn't last the entire race. McDuffie said, "We didn't have time to fix it because we would have had to install a new head. We didn't locate the trouble until we made a last minute check on the valves. That head was the only thing in the engine I didn't build. It was a factory head."

Welborn led the early laps in the race but his race ended after 75 laps (of 200) with engine problems. Other leaders in the first 22 laps of the race were "Tiger" Tom Pistone and Joe Weatherly. Fireball Roberts took over the lead on lap 23, leading the next 20 laps before dropping out on lap 57 due to a broken fuel pump. When Roberts went to the pits on lap 43, Johnny Beauchamp, running in second place, became the leader. On lap 50, Pistone took over first place and Jack Smith moved into second; Beauchamp was third and Lee Petty was fifth. From lap 43 to 148, the race leaders were Pistone, Smith, and Beauchamp. Although Smith and Pistone led most of these laps, Beauchamp led a few times, for example records show he led on lap 110. There is print information about the details of the race, including the leaders of the race in five-lap intervals. Pistone and Jack Smith both had dropped out of contention by lap 149 and Beauchamp took over first place. 100 miles (160 km). Richard Petty also had to retire from the race with an engine problem and earned $100 ($1,104.45 when adjusted for inflation) for his 57th-place performance.

Lee Petty battled with Beauchamp during the final 30 laps of the race, and they were the only two drivers to finish on the lead lap. Petty took the lead with three laps left and led at the start of the final lap. Petty and Beauchamp drove side by side across the finish line at the end final lap for a photo finish. Beauchamp was declared the unofficial winner by NASCAR officials, and he drove to victory lane. Petty protested the results, saying "I had Beauchamp by a good two feet. In my own mind, I know I won." Beauchamp replied "I had him by two feet. I glanced over to Lee Petty's car as I crossed the finish line and I could see his headlight slightly back of my car. It was so close I didn't know how they would call it, but I thought I won." Early leader Fireball Roberts, who was standing by the finish line, said: "There's no doubt about it, Petty won." It took NASCAR founder Bill France Sr. three days to decide the winner the following Wednesday. In the end, with the help of photographs and newsreel footage, Petty was officially declared the winner.

The controversial finish helped the sport. The delayed results to determine the official winner kept NASCAR and the Daytona 500 on the front page of newspapers.

== Official results ==
The race lasted 3:41:22, with an average speed of 135.521 mph (218.10 km/h).

Fin	St	#	Driver	Make	Laps	Led	Status
1	15	42	Lee Petty	1959 Oldsmobile	200	38	running
2	21	73	Johnny Beauchamp	1959 Ford Thunderbird	200	30	running
3	17	18	Charley Griffith	1957 Pontiac	199	0	running
4	11	6	Cotton Owens	1958 Pontiac	199	0	running
5	7	48	Joe Weatherly	1959 Chevrolet	199	6	running
6	39	7	Jim Reed	1959 Chevrolet	196	0	running
7	41	47	Jack Smith	1959 Chevrolet	196	57	running
8	5	59	Tom Pistone	1959 Ford Thunderbird	195	39	running
9	42	15	Tim Flock	1959 Ford Thunderbird	193	0	running
10	31	1	Speedy Thompson	1957 Chevrolet	193	0	running
11	59	8	Johnny Allen	1957 Chevrolet	192	0	running
12	35	38	Raul Cilloniz	1959 Ford Thunderbird	192	0	running
13	43	41	Curtis Turner	1959 Ford Thunderbird	189	0	running
14	33	11	Junior Johnson	1957 Ford	189	0	running
15	25	29	Dick Freeman	1959 Chevrolet	188	0	running
16	16	77	Joe Lee Johnson	1957 Chevrolet Convertible	187	0	running
17	4	98	Marvin Panch	1958 Ford Convertible	185	0	running
18	10	25	Gene White	1957 Chevrolet Convertible	185	0	running
19	57	9	Roy Tyner	1957 Chevrolet	184	0	running
20	18	2	Jimmy Thompson	1957 Chevrolet	182	0	running
21	49	19	Herman Beam	1957 Chevrolet	182	0	running
22	14	92	Wilbur Rakestraw	1957 Ford Convertible	181	0	running
23	53	16	Jim McGuirk	1959 Pontiac	181	0	running
24	12	76	Larry Frank	1958 Ford Convertible	178	0	running
25	48	10	Elmo Langley	1957 Ford	175	0	running
26	19	4	Rex White	1959 Chevrolet	174	0	engine
27	30	55	Ben Benz	1957 Chevrolet Convertible	169	0	running
28	27	71	Dick Joslin	1957 Dodge	167	0	piston
29	24	14	Ken Rush	1957 Mercury Convertible	163	0	engine
30	55	80	Bob Rose	1957 Chevrolet	162	0	running
31	50	69	Harold Smith	1959 Studebaker	159	0	running
32	44	66	Dick Foley	1959 Chevrolet	157	0	running
33	28	32	Brownie King	1958 Chevrolet Convertible	152	0	engine
34	8	21	Glen Wood	1958 Ford Convertible	149	0	clutch
35	47	83	Bob Pronger	1958 Ford	143	0	running
36	26	39	Billy Carden	1957 Mercury Convertible	140	0	running
37	23	81	Bernie Hentges	1959 DeSoto	138	0	engine
38	2	99	Shorty Rollins	1958 Ford Convertible	115	0	engine
39	22	82	Joe Eubanks	1958 Ford Convertible	95	0	transmission
40	13	88	Tiny Lund	1959 Chevrolet	92	0	timing
41	1	49	Bob Welborn	1959 Chevrolet	75	9	engine
42	54	87	Buck Baker	1959 Chevrolet	75	0	timing
43	37	53	Ken Johnson	1957 Ford	67	0	push rod
44	58	74	L.D. Austin	1957 Chevrolet	65	0	generator
45	46	3	Fireball Roberts	1959 Pontiac	56	21	fuel pump
46	40	45	Paul Bass	1958 Ford Edsel Convertible	52	0	engine
47	29	72A	Bobby Johns	1957 Chevrolet	46	0	overheating
48	9	37	Eduardo Dibos	1959 Ford Thunderbird	44	0	suspension
49	36	50	Gober Sosebee	1957 Chevrolet Convertible	44	0	transmission
50	20	89	Bob Said	1958 Chevrolet Convertible	42	0	transmission
51	51	95	Bob Duell	1959 Ford	38	0	distributor
52	32	36	Pete Kelly	1957 Chevrolet Convertible	34	0	engine
53	45	24	Bob Potter	1959 Chevrolet	33	0	timing
54	52	86	Carl Tyler	1957 Ford	29	0	overheating
55	34	33	George Green	1957 Chevrolet Convertible	21	0	engine
56	3	64	Fritz Wilson	1959 Ford Thunderbird	15	0	piston
57	6	43	Richard Petty	1957 Oldsmobile Convertible	8	0	engine
58	38	79	Larry Odo	1957 Ford Convertible	3	0	engine
59	56	75	Ken Marriott	1958 Ford Convertible	1	0	engine
