= 1960 NASCAR Grand National Series =

American motorsport season

1960 Grand National Series

Seasons
- ← 1959 1961 →

The 1960 NASCAR Grand National season was the 12th season of NASCAR Grand National Division. Emanuel Zervakis was disqualified upon post-race inspection for the April 17 race due to an oversized fuel tank. This would be the last disqualification of a driver who had won the race on the track until 2022.

== Races ==
no	Date	Race (name of)	Track	Track type		Race outcome			
no	Date	Race (name of)	Track	Pavement/shape	Length category	Winner	Second	Third	Report
1	8 November	100 Miles at Southern States Fairgrounds	Southern States Fairgrounds (Charlotte, NC)	D dirt oval	short track	Jack Smith	Bob Welborn	Buck Baker	
2	26 November	100 Miles at Columbia Speedway	Columbia Speedway (Cayce, SC)	D dirt oval	short track	Ned Jarrett	Jack Smith	Joe Lee Johnson	
3	12 February	Daytona 500 Qualifier #1	Daytona International Speedway (Daytona Beach, FL)	P paved oval	superspeedway	Fireball Roberts	Cotton Owens	Fred Lorenzen	
4	12 February	Daytona 500 Qualifier #2	Daytona International Speedway (Daytona Beach, FL)	P paved oval	superspeedway	Jack Smith	Bobby Johns	Jim Reed	
5	14 February	Daytona 500	Daytona International Speedway (Daytona Beach, FL)	P paved oval	superspeedway	Junior Johnson	Bobby Johns	Richard Petty	report
6	28 February	100 Miles at Southern States Fairgrounds	Southern States Fairgrounds (Charlotte, NC)	D dirt oval	short track	Richard Petty	Rex White	Doug Yates	
7	27 March	Gwyn Staley 160	North Wilkesboro Speedway (North Wilkesboro, NC)	P paved oval	short track	Lee Petty	Rex White	Glen Wood	report
8	3 April	Copper Cup 100	Arizona State Fairgrounds (Phoenix, AZ)	D dirt oval	intermediate	John Rostek	Mel Larson	Scotty Cain	
9	5 April	100 Miles at Columbia Speedway	Columbia Speedway (Cayce, SC)	D dirt oval	short track	Rex White	Buck Baker	Doug Yates	
10	10 April	Virginia 500	Martinsville Speedway (Ridgeway, VA)	P paved oval	short track	Richard Petty	Jimmy Massey	Glen Wood	
11	15 April	Hickory 250	Hickory Speedway (Hickory, NC)	D dirt oval	short track	Joe Weatherly	Ned Jarrett	Richard Petty	
12	17 April	100 Miles at Wilson Speedway	Wilson Speedway (Wilson, NC)	D dirt oval	short track	Joe Weatherly	Lee Petty	Tom Pistone	
13	18 April	50 Miles at Bowman-Gray Stadium	Bowman Gray Stadium (Winston-Salem, NC)	P paved oval	short track	Glen Wood	Rex White	Jimmy Massey	
14	23 April	Greenville 200	Greenville-Pickens Speedway (Easley, SC)	D dirt oval	short track	Ned Jarrett	Lee Petty	Richard Petty	
15	24 April	84 Miles at Asheville-Weaverville Speedway	Asheville Weaverville Speedway (Weaverville, NC)	D dirt oval	short track	Lee Petty	Joe Lee Johnson	Ned Jarrett	
16	14 May	Rebel 300	Darlington Raceway (Darlington, SC)	P paved oval	intermediate	Joe Weatherly	Richard Petty	Rex White	
17	28 May	100 Miles at Piedmont Interstate Fairgrounds	Piedmont Interstate Fairgrounds (Spartanburg, SC)	D dirt oval	short track	Ned Jarrett	Lee Petty	Cotton Owens	
18	29 May	99 Miles at Occoneechee Speedway	Occoneechee Speedway (Orange County, NC)	D dirt oval	short track	Lee Petty	Ned Jarrett	Jack Smith	
19	5 June	Richmond 200	Atlantic Rural Fairgrounds (Richmond, VA)	D dirt oval	short track	Lee Petty	Rex White	Ned Jarrett	
20	12 June	California 250	Marchbanks Speedway (Hanford, CA)	P paved oval	intermediate	Marvin Porter	Joe Weatherly	John Rostek	
21	19 June	World 600	Charlotte Motor Speedway (Concord, NC)	P paved oval	intermediate	Joe Lee Johnson	Johnny Beauchamp	Bobby Johns	report
22	25 June	International 200	Bowman Gray Stadium (Winston-Salem, NC)	P paved oval	short track	Glen Wood	Lee Petty	Rex White	report
23	4 July	Firecracker 250	Daytona International Speedway (Daytona Beach, FL)	P paved oval	superspeedway	Jack Smith	Cotton Owens	Fireball Roberts	
24	10 July	94 Miles at Heidelberg Raceway	Heidelberg Raceway (Pittsburgh, PA)	D dirt oval	short track	Lee Petty	Richard Petty	Rex White	
25	17 July	Empire State 200	Montgomery Air Base (Montgomery, NY)	P paved oval (temporary)	short track	Rex White	Richard Petty	Lee Petty	
26	23 July	108 Miles at Rambi Race Track	Rambi Raceway (Myrtle Beach, SC)	D dirt oval	short track	Buck Baker	Lee Petty	Rex White	
27	31 July	Dixie 300	Atlanta International Raceway (Hampton, GA)	P paved oval	intermediate	Fireball Roberts	Cotton Owens	Jack Smith	
28	3 August	50 Miles at Dixie Speedway	Dixie Speedway (Birmingham, AL) (Note: 1960 was the only year that the series held a race at the Dixie Speedway)	P paved oval	short track	Ned Jarrett	Richard Petty	Lee Petty	
29	7 August	Nashville 400	Music City Motorplex (Nashville, TN)	P paved oval	short track	Johnny Beauchamp	Rex White	Buck Baker	
30	14 August	Western North Carolina 500	Asheville Weaverville Speedway (Weaverville, NC)	D dirt oval	short track	Rex White	Possum Jones	Emanuel Zervakis	
31	16 August	100 Miles at Piedmont Interstate Fairgrounds	Piedmont Interstate Fairgrounds (Spartanburg, SC)	D dirt oval	short track	Cotton Owens	Lee Petty	Junior Johnson	
32	18 August	150 Miles at Columbia Speedway	Columbia Speedway (Cayce, SC)	D dirt oval	short track	Rex White	Richard Petty	Buck Baker	
33	20 August	60 Miles at South Boston Speedway	South Boston Speedway (South Boston, VA)	P paved oval	short track	Junior Johnson	Possum Jones	Rex White	
34	23 August	50 Miles at Bowman-Gray Stadium	Bowman Gray Stadium (Winston-Salem, NC)	P paved oval	short track	Glen Wood	Lee Petty	Junior Johnson	
35	5 September	Southern 500	Darlington Raceway (Darlington, SC)	P paved oval	intermediate	Buck Baker	Rex White	Jim Paschal	report
36	9 September	Buddy Shuman 250	Hickory Speedway (Hickory, NC)	D dirt oval	short track	Junior Johnson	Possum Jones	Rex White	
37	11 September	100 Miles at California State Fairgrounds	California State Fairgrounds (Sacramento, CA)	D dirt oval	intermediate	Jim Cook	Scotty Cain	Lloyd Dane	
38	15 September	50 Miles at Gamecock Speedway	Gamecock Speedway (Sumter SC) (Note: 1960 was the only year that the series held a race at this track –a 3/8 mile track on Wedgefield Road, still operating as Sumter Speedway.)	D dirt oval	short track	Ned Jarrett	David Pearson	Junior Johnson	
39	18 September	99 Miles at Occoneechee Speedway	Occoneechee Speedway (Orange County, NC)	D dirt oval	short track	Richard Petty	Ned Jarrett	Rex White	
40	25 September	Old Dominion 500	Martinsville Speedway (Ridgeway, VA)	P paved oval	short track	Rex White	Joe Weatherly	Junior Johnson	
41	2 October	Wilkes 320	North Wilkesboro Speedway (North Wilkesboro, NC)	P paved oval	short track	Rex White	Junior Johnson	Possum Jones	
42	16 October	National 400	Charlotte Motor Speedway (Concord, NC)	P paved oval	intermediate	Speedy Thompson	Richard Petty	Ned Jarrett	report
43	23 October	Capital City 200	Atlantic Rural Fairgrounds (Richmond, VA)	D dirt oval	short track	Speedy Thompson	Junior Johnson	Ned Jarrett	
44	30 October	Atlanta 500	Atlanta International Raceway (Hampton, GA)	P paved oval	intermediate	Bobby Johns	Johnny Allen	Jim Paschal	report

== Final standings ==
Fin	Driver	Pts	St	W	T5	T10	Pole
1	Rex White	21164	40	6	25	35	3
2	Richard Petty	17228	40	3	16	30	2
3	Bobby Johns	14964	19	1	8	10	0
4	Buck Baker	14674	37	2	15	24	2
5	Ned Jarrett	14660	40	5	20	26	5
6	Lee Petty	14510	39	5	21	30	3
7	Junior Johnson	9932	34	3	14	18	3
8	Emanuel Zervakis	9720	14	0	2	10	1
9	Jim Paschal	8968	10	0	3	7	0
10	Banjo Matthews	8458	12	0	0	4	0
11	Johnny Beauchamp	8306	11	1	3	5	0
12	Herman Beam	7776	26	0	1	6	0
13	Joe Lee Johnson	7352	22	1	6	8	0
14	Jack Smith	6944	13	3	7	7	3
15	Fred Lorenzen	6764	10	0	3	5	0
16	Bob Welborn	6732	15	0	6	10	0
17	Jimmy Pardue	6682	32	0	1	11	0
18	Tom Pistone	6572	20	0	2	8	0
19	Johnny Allen	6506	10	0	2	5	0
20	Joe Weatherly	6380	24	3	7	11	0
21	Doug Yates	6374	24	0	3	8	1
22	L.D. Austin	6180	27	0	1	10	0
23	David Pearson	5956	22	0	3	7	1
24	Gerald Duke	5950	11	0	1	7	0
25	Speedy Thompson	5658	9	2	4	5	0
26	Marvin Panch	5268	11	0	0	1	0
27	Paul Lewis	5212	22	0	0	4	0
28	Curtis Crider	4720	24	0	0	2	0
29	Fireball Roberts	4700	9	2	2	3	6
30	Shorty Rollins	4374	4	0	0	1	0
31	Possum Jones	4270	13	0	4	5	0
32	Tiny Lund	4124	8	0	0	2	0
33	G.C. Spencer	3986	26	0	2	6	0
34	Larry Frank	3634	11	0	0	2	0
35	Herb Tillman	3504	9	0	0	0	0
36	Curtis Turner	3300	9	0	0	1	1
37	Bunkie Blackburn	3252	20	0	1	4	0
38	Buddy Baker	3070	15	0	0	1	0
39	Cotton Owens	3050	14	1	5	5	2
40	Charley Griffith	2684	5	0	0	0	0
41	Wilbur Rakestraw	2676	12	0	0	1	0
42	Jimmy Massey	2662	6	0	2	3	0
43	Jimmy Thompson	2472	9	0	0	0	0
44	Jim Reed	2340	8	0	1	1	0
45	Jim Cook	2178	3	1	1	1	1
46	Ernie Gahan	2080	2	0	0	0	0
47	Elmo Henderson	2072	6	0	0	0	0
48	Bob Burdick	1970	2	0	0	1	0
49	Roz Howard	1810	3	0	0	2	0
50	Bob Potter	1800	3	0	0	1	0
51	Joe Caspolich	1790	5	0	0	0	0
52	Roy Tyner	1742	23	0	1	5	0
53	Jim Whitman	1640	5	0	0	0	0
54	Elmo Langley	1534	11	0	0	0	0
55	Tommy Irwin	1406	16	0	4	11	1
56	Darrell Dake	1400	2	0	0	1	0
57	Joe Eubanks	1302	7	0	1	2	0
58	Roscoe Thompson	1224	2	0	0	0	0
59	Whitey Gerken	1180	2	0	0	0	0
60	Fred Harb	1144	20	0	2	7	0
61	Lennie Page	1024	5	0	0	2	0
62	E.J. Trivette	912	9	0	0	0	0
63	Tim Flock	890	2	0	0	1	0
64	Bob Duell	846	6	0	0	1	0
65	Shep Langdon	840	4	0	0	1	0
66	Mel Larson	824	4	0	1	2	1
67	Gene Marmor	800	4	0	0	1	0
68	Fritz Wilson	774	4	0	2	2	0
69	Marvin Porter	734	3	1	1	1	0
70	Reb Wickersham	710	7	0	0	0	0
71	Don Noel	658	3	0	1	1	0
72	Bruce Worrell	658	3	0	0	2	0
73	Dick Joslin	630	3	0	0	0	0
74	Wes Morgan	620	2	0	0	0	0
75	Lloyd Dane	614	3	0	2	2	0
76	Eddie Gray	552	4	0	0	1	0
77	Al Self	538	2	0	0	1	0
78	Bob Perry	520	3	0	0	1	0
79	Scotty Cain	496	4	0	2	2	0
80	Bob Price	492	3	0	0	0	0
81	Richard Riley	484	4	0	0	1	0
82	Art Watts	480	1	0	0	1	0
83	Ron Hornaday	476	3	0	1	1	0
84	Jim Blomgren	444	3	0	0	2	0
85	Bud Parnell	416	4	0	0	1	0
86	Johnny Sudderth	410	3	0	0	0	0
87	Friday Hassler	388	2	0	0	0	0
88	Spook Crawford	368	3	0	0	1	0
89	Charlie Chapman	360	1	0	0	0	0
90	Danny Weinberg	330	3	0	1	1	0
91	Parnelli Jones	320	3	0	0	1	0
92	Ed Andrews	312	1	0	0	0	0
93	Bob Burdick	310	2	0	0	1	0
94	Maurice Petty	304	2	0	0	2	0
95	Shorty York	296	2	0	0	0	0
96	Arnold Gardner	290	4	0	0	0	0
97	Jim Austin	288	2	0	0	0	0
98	George Green	270	3	0	0	0	0
99	Pappy Crane	264	2	0	0	1	0
100	T.C. Hunt	264	3	0	0	0	0
101	Dick Foley	260	2	0	0	0	0
102	Chuck Tombs	248	2	0	0	0	0
103	Glen Wood	244	9	3	6	7	4
104	Gene White	234	3	0	0	0	0
105	Bob Ross	230	3	0	0	0	0
106	Kuzie Kuzmanich	224	2	0	0	1	0
107	Sal Tovella	220	2	0	0	0	0
108	Eddie Riker	220	1	0	0	0	0
109	Runt Harris	220	3	0	0	0	0
110	Bob Kosiski	200	2	0	0	0	0
111	Ed Markstellar	200	2	0	0	0	0
112	Owen Loggins	192	1	0	0	0	0
113	Brownie King	190	3	0	0	1	0
114	John Potter	186	2	0	0	0	0
115	Bunk Moore	180	3	0	0	0	0
116	Jack Hart	180	1	0	0	0	0
117	Burrhead Nantz	180	3	0	0	0	0
118	Johnny Miller	174	2	0	0	0	0
119	Dick Dixon	170	2	0	0	0	0
120	Bill Massey	168	1	0	0	0	0
121	George Tet	160	1	0	0	0	0
122	Frank Secrist	158	2	0	0	0	1
123	Bill Whitley	156	1	0	0	0	0
124	Dick Freeman	150	2	0	0	0	0
125	Bill Morgan	144	1	0	0	1	0
126	Smokey Cook	144	1	0	0	0	0
127	Tommy Herbert	140	2	0	0	0	0
128	Dave Hirschfield	130	2	0	0	0	0
129	Bill Lutz	130	2	0	0	0	0
130	Jack Norton	120	1	0	0	0	0
131	Red Farmer	120	2	0	0	0	0
132	Cale Yarborough	104	1	0	0	0	0
134	Al Pombo	100	1	0	0	0	0
135	Dick Getty	96	2	0	0	0	0
136	Charlie Glotzbach	84	2	0	0	0	0
137	LeeRoy Yarbrough	84	1	0	0	0	0
138	Bob Eichor	84	1	0	0	0	0
139	Paul Norris	84	1	0	0	0	0
140	Bob Barron	76	1	0	0	0	0
141	Jerry Roedell	76	1	0	0	0	0
142	Don O'Dell	76	1	0	0	0	0
143	Carl Burris	60	2	0	0	0	0
144	Johnny Dollar	60	2	0	0	0	0
145	Neil Castles	50	18	0	0	5	0
146	Marshall Sargent	40	1	0	0	0	0
147	Harvey Hege	28	1	0	0	0	0
148	Johnny Mello	24	1	0	0	0	0
149	Bob Hogle	24	1	0	0	0	0
150	Danny Weinberg	24	3	0	1	1	0
151	Aubrey Boles	20	1	0	0	0	0
152	Pat Moore	20	1	0	0	0	0
	Barney Shore		1	0	0	0	0
	Herb Shannon		1	0	0	0	0
	John Rostek		5	1	2	3	1
	Bob Roberts		1	0	0	0	0
	Bob Reuther		1	0	0	0	0
	Clem Proctor		1	0	0	0	0
	Dick Smith		2	0	0	2	0
	Harold Smith		2	0	0	0	0
	Lyle Stelter		2	0	0	0	0
	Al Tasnady		1	0	0	0	0
	Bobby Waddell		1	0	0	0	0
	Nook Walters		1	0	1	1	0
	Al White		2	0	0	1	0
	Johnny Wolford		1	0	0	0	0
	Lee Parris		1	0	0	0	0
	Paul Parks		3	0	0	0	0
	Brownie Brown		1	0	0	0	0
	Bud Burdick		2	0	0	1	0
	Bill Cook		1	0	0	0	0
	John Dodd, Jr.		2	0	0	0	0
	Bill Gazaway		1	0	0	0	0
	Hubert Johnson		1	0	0	0	0
	Ken Johnson		4	0	0	0	0
	Jimmie Lewallen		2	0	0	0	0
	Nace Mattingly		2	0	0	1	0
	Buzz McCann		1	0	0	0	0
	Steve McGrath		1	0	0	0	0
	Clyde Mitchell		2	0	0	1	0
	James Norton		5	0	0	1	0
	Buck Brigance		2	0	0	1	0
	Chuck Scharf		0	0	0	0	0
	Charles Griffin		0	0	0	0	0
	Leroy Thomas		0	0	0	0	0
	Gary Raymond		0	0	0	0	0
