= Bob Welborn =

American racing driver (1928–1997)

- Bob Welborn's image on a NASCAR sports card
- Born: Robert Joe Welborn; May 5, 1928; Denton, North Carolina, U.S.
- Died: August 10, 1997 (aged 69)
- Achievements: 1956 NASCAR Convertible Division Champion; 1957 NASCAR Convertible Division Champion; 1958 NASCAR Convertible Division Champion; Led NASCAR Convertible Division in wins two times (1958, 1959); 1959 Daytona 500 pole winner (first annual)
- Awards: Named one of NASCAR's 50 Greatest Drivers (1998); National Motorsports Press Association Hall of Fame (1982); Named one of NASCAR's 75 Greatest Drivers (2023)

NASCAR Cup Series career
- 183 races run over 13 years
- Best finish: 4th (1955)
- First race: 1952 (Martinsville)
- Last race: 1964 Pennsylvania 200 (New Oxford)
- First win: 1957 Sweepstakes 500 (Martinsville)
- Last win: 1959 Western North Carolina 500 (Weaverville)
Wins	Top tens	Poles
9	102	7

NASCAR Convertible Division career
- 111 races run over 4 years
- Best finish: 1st (1956, 1957, 1958)
- First race: 1956 Charlotte 100 (Charlotte)
- Last race: 1959 Charlotte 100 (Charlotte)
- First win: 1956 Fayetteville 50 (Fayetteville)
- Last win: 1959 Weaverville 100 (Asheville-Weaverville)
Wins	Top tens	Poles
19	87	18
- Statistics up to date as of February 23, 2013.

Robert Joe Welborn (May 5, 1928 – August 10, 1997) of Denton, North Carolina was an American NASCAR Grand National Series driver. He was named to NASCAR's 50 Greatest Drivers list in 1998. He won the final three NASCAR Convertible Division championships in 1956, 1957, and 1958.

== NASCAR career ==
Welborn drove in 11 Grand National events in 1953 for Julian Petty and J.O. Goode’s. He had two top-five finishes and six top-ten finishes.

Welborn drove in nine events in 1954 for owners Julian Petty, Bob Griffin, and George Hutchens. Welborn had one top-five and three top-ten finishes.

Welborn drove in 32 of 45 events in Julian Petty and his cars. He won the pole at Greenville-Pickens Speedway. Welborn finished fourth in the 1955 points.

Welborn raced in six events in 1956. He also won the NASCAR Convertible Division championship.

Welborn won his first race at Martinsville in 1957, but did not cross the finish line. Lewis "Possum" Jones relieved Welborn halfway through the race, but NASCAR always credits the driver who started the car. He had one win and three top-ten finished in five events. Welborn also won the NASCAR Convertible series championship.

Welborn had four straight wins (and five total), one pole, ten top-five, and 15 top-ten finishes in 1958. He raced in 18 of 51 events, all for Julian Petty. He only finished 149th in series points that year because he only participated in 18 of 51 races. He won his third straight NASCAR Convertible championship.

Driving a car prepared by Paul McDuffie, Welborn won the pole position for the 1959 Daytona 500 by winning his qualifying race. He had five poles and three wins during the season.

Welborn amassed nine total wins in the 1950s and early 1960s driving his car and one owned by Julian Petty. He made his last NASCAR start in 1964 while driving for Holman-Moody.

== Career awards ==
- Welborn was named one of NASCAR's 50 Greatest Drivers in 1998.
- Welborn was inducted in the National Motorsports Press Association's Hall of Fame in 1982.
