= NASCAR Convertible Division =

Former division of NASCAR

- Category: Stock car racing
- Country: United States
- Inaugural season: 1956
- Folded: 1962

The NASCAR Convertible Division was a division of convertible cars early in NASCAR's history, from 1956 until 1959, although the signature race for convertibles remained a Convertible Division race until 1962. Two remnants of the Convertible Division are still used in the NASCAR Cup Series today: the Duel at Daytona (one Daytona 500 qualifying race was reserved for convertibles) and the Goodyear 400 (started as a convertible race until the end of the division).

== History ==
NASCAR purchased SAFE (Society of Auto Sports, Fellowship, and Education)'s all-convertible Circuit of Champions “All Stars” circuit late in 1955. Most drivers did not make the transition to NASCAR's sanction. NASCAR ran the division from 1956 until 1959. Some Convertibles raced against the Grand National hardtop cars in the same race. The 1959 Daytona 500 had one qualifying race for Convertibles and one for the hardtop Grand National cars. 20 of the 59 cars in the Daytona 500 were convertibles. The split qualifying races of the 1959 race led to the development of the Duel at Daytona qualifying races still used in the Daytona 500.

=== Rebel 300 at Darlington ===
The current Goodyear 400 Cup Series race at Darlington Raceway was held as a Convertible Division race from 1957–1962. As NASCAR's only superspeedway in 1957, the inaugural Rebel 300 was held as a Convertible race on May 11, 1957, only to be delayed by rain and raced on the ensuing Sunday (May 12), drawing a fine for promoter Bob Colvin for violating South Carolina blue law (the track's signature fall race, the Southern 500, was held on Labor Day Monday until 1983, when the state waived the Blue Law for 250-mile (402 km) or longer automobile races). The Rebel 300 would be held as a Confederate Memorial Day Convertible race even after the division ended in 1959, with full Grand National points awarded for three more Convertible division races from 1960–62, won by Joe Weatherly, Fred Lorenzen, and the final Rebel 300 for convertibles on May 12, 1962, won by Nelson Stacy.

The Rebel 300 was run as a Grand National race with hardtops for the first time in 1963 as two 150-mile races before adopting a full 300-mile race in 1964, and expanded to 400 miles in 1966, before going to 500 miles in 1974, reverting to 400 miles in 1994. From 2005–13, the lineal Rebel stayed on the schedule but was moved to May as a 500-mile race, and in April 2014. The race ran in September from 2015 to 2020, before a lineage swap with the newly reinstated Southern 500 weekend in May meant the race returned to its traditional Confederate Memorial Day weekend event in 2021, returning to 400 miles.

== List of champions ==
- 1956 Bob Welborn, 1956 Chevrolet
- 1957 Bob Welborn, 1957 Chevrolet
- 1958 Bob Welborn, 1957 Chevrolet
- 1959 Joe Lee Johnson, 1957 Chevrolet
