= 1961 Daytona 500 =

Auto race run in Florida in 1961

Race details
- Race 5 of 52 in the 1961 NASCAR Grand National Series season
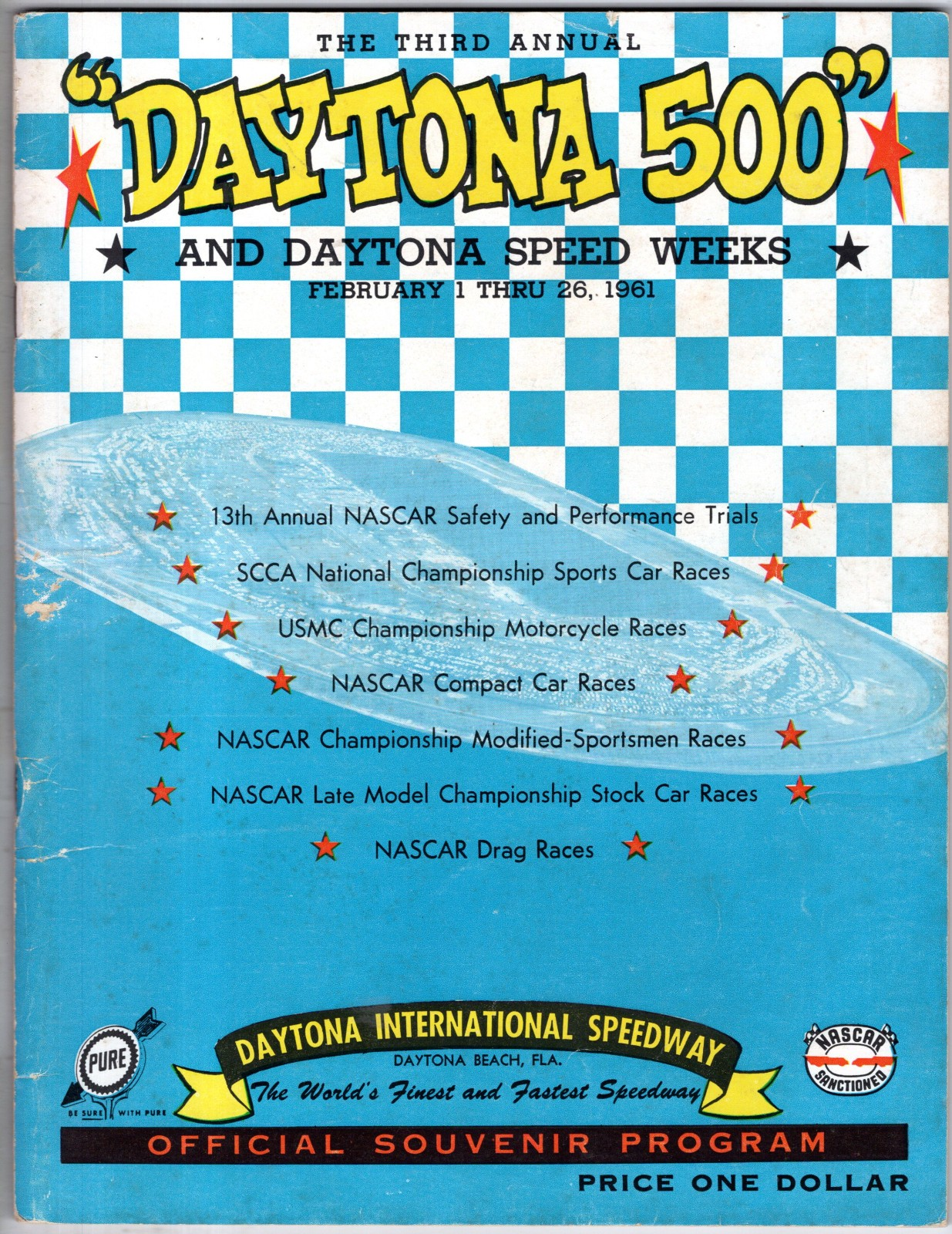
- 1961 Daytona 500 program cover
- Date: February 26, 1961
- Location: Daytona International Speedway; Daytona Beach, Florida, U.S.
- Course: Permanent racing facility 2.5 mi (4.023 km)
- Distance: 200 laps, 500 mi (800 km)
- Weather: Temperatures reaching 69.1 °F (20.6 °C); wind speeds approaching 15 miles per hour (24 km/h)
- Average speed: 149.601 miles per hour (240.759 km/h)

Pole position
Driver	Fireball Roberts	Smokey Yunick

Qualifying race winners
Duel 1 Winner	Fireball Roberts	Smokey Yunick
Duel 2 Winner	Joe Weatherly	Bud Moore

Most laps led
Driver	Fireball Roberts	Smokey Yunick
- Laps: 170

Winner
No. 20 Pontiac	Marvin Panch	Smokey Yunick

Television in the United States
- Network: none
- Announcers: none

The 1961 Daytona 500, was a NASCAR Grand National Series event that was held on February 26, 1961, at Daytona International Speedway in Daytona Beach, Florida.

Marvin Panch won the race in the one-year-old 1960 Pontiac built and owned by Smokey Yunick after taking the lead on lap 187. Panch was not originally scheduled to drive, and was only added to Yunick's team after Fireball Roberts suggested adding him. Panch drove the number 20 to victory in three hours and 20 minutes. The race was run in its entirety without a single caution flag. Panch took the lead with 13 laps remaining when race leader Fireball Roberts' car suffered a blown engine. The win was Panch's first, and only victory of the season.

== Background ==
Tragedy struck during the preliminaries of Daytona Speedweeks when a driver from Phoenix, Arizona crashed in turn 3 of the 2.5-mile (4.0-kilometre) track. Harold Haberling was killed when his 1955 modified Chevy flipped in the 31-degree banking. This was the first fatality at the facility since 1959.

One week prior to the Daytona 500 drivers competed in a first-ever 150-mile (240-kilometre) "compact car" race. Lee Petty won the race contested on the 3.1-mile (5.0 km) infield track in a 1960 Valiant with an average speed of 83.546 miles per hour (134.454 km/h). Joe Weatherly would flip his 1960 Falcon upside down during the race, but no other cars were involved in the accident, and Weatherly was not injured. Weatherly then went on to win a 10-lap, 25-mile (40 km) event dubbed a "Race of Champions" on the 2.5-mile (4.0 km) banked tri-oval. Drivers competed in the same cars that they would run in the Daytona 500. The race proved to be a tough loss for Fireball Roberts, who had started at the rear of the field but managed to charge to the lead in only 4 laps. On the last lap, Weatherly overtook Roberts at the finish line, winning by only 2 feet.

A total of 70 drivers registered to run in the 1961 Daytona 500, but only the top 60 would be scheduled to start the race. A total of 13 teams came to Daytona with the new, more aerodynamically designed 1961 Pontiacs contributed by the manufacturer. Smokey Yunick brought Fireball Roberts as his primary driver for the new model vehicle, and it was Roberts who suggested that Yunick add teammate Marvin Panch. Panch was a 'last minute' addition to Yunick's team and given the year-old 1960 Pontiac rather than one of the newer models. When approached, Yunick relented to allowing Panch to drive Roberts' Pontiac Catalina from the previous year, saying: "If you think that much about [the '60 Pontiac], take it outside." [the shop], where the mechanics prepared the car for the 500.

During the initial 2-lap qualifying trials Fireball Roberts set a new track record of 155.700 miles per hour (250.575 km/h) average speed over the 5-mile (8.0 km) run. The second fastest average belonged to Joe Weatherly in his 1961 Pontiac, with Cotton Owens, Curtis Turner, and Marvin Panch rounding out the top 5. Roberts broke the previous track record speed of 152.129 mph (244.828 km/h) set by Jack Smith the previous July. Roberts' effort was the first of three consecutive pole positions that he captured from 1961 through 1963. The 3 "consecutive" poles was a first, and a record which Roberts still shares with Bill Elliott (1985–87) and Ken Schrader (1988–90).

=== Twin qualifying events ===
The two qualifying events which established the starting lineup of the Daytona 500 were marred by multiple crashes in which at least one fan and seven drivers were injured on February 24, 1961. A total of 34 drivers were scheduled for the first of two qualifying events, and 33 cars scheduled for the second event. The top 20 finishers would secure positions in the upcoming 500-mile (800 km) event, with winners of each qualifier also earning a $5,000 purse. The top two time-trial qualifiers were also guaranteed the top two starting spots.

An accident early in the first event involved Dave Mader and Wes Morgan in which Morgan's car flipped seven times going into the 4th turn. Both Lee Petty and son Richard Petty crashed during their respective 100-mile (160 km) qualifying events, forcing Petty Enterprises into a noncompetitive role for the 1961 Daytona 500. Son Richard crashed through the guardrail and suffered a sprained ankle in the first qualifier, and while the car remained upright, the crash kept him from starting the 500. The wreck occurred when driver Junior Johnson got thrown out of control as debris from an earlier wreck caused a cut tire, and he made contact with the younger Petty's car. The crash left Johnson with a severe gash to his chin, and Petty with shards of glass in his eye. The younger Petty's crash brought out one of the five cautions in the first 40-lap qualifier, which was shortened due to crashes at both ends of the track during the closing laps.

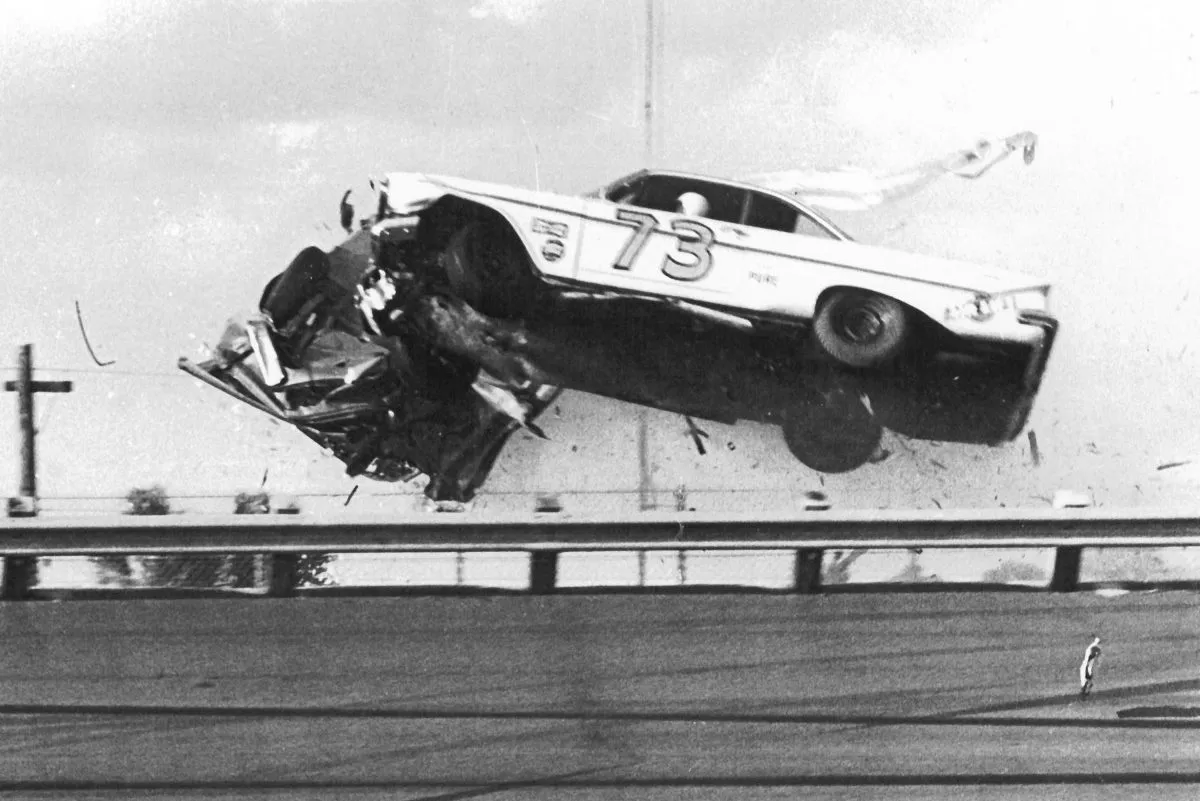
Beauchamp's car flying over the guardrail

Shortly after Richard Petty left the infield medical center after the first race crash, his attention was drawn to an accident involving his father in the second race. Patriarch Lee tangled with Johnny Beauchamp when Beauchamp caught Petty's back bumper sending the two cars through the guardrail which destroyed both vehicles. The accident started when Banjo Matthews spun in front of the field while leading the second qualifying 100-mile (160 km) race. The senior Petty suffered multiple life-threatening injuries, including numerous fractures, internal injuries, and a punctured lung. When the two cars left the track, Petty's car struck spectator A. B. Kelley, who suffered severe cuts, but helped evacuate Petty from the twisted metal. Beauchamp and Petty tore out 13 8-inch by 8-inch guardrail support posts while exiting the track. There's been speculation that the early crash between Mader and Morgan may have weakened that section. Some of the drivers felt that much of the blame for the multiple crashes lay in the fact that so many rookie drivers were not capable of running competently; and Joe Weatherly stated: “I know it was veteran drivers in the worst crashes, but it was rookies that caused them, dammit!” Petty was hospitalized for over four months, but did recover. While Beauchamp also suffered injuries to his head, they were less serious. Petty and Beauchamp were no strangers to each other; having been involved in the iconic finish of the inaugural 1959 Daytona 500 where they crossed the finish line so close to each other that it took NASCAR 3 days before Bill France Sr. declared Lee Petty the winner. Beauchamp never raced again after the accident; and while Petty did return to run a half-dozen races, the wreck effectively ended both driver's careers. Driver Rex White stated that: “If NASCAR doesn’t have a meeting to educate some of these amateurs, there can’t be much of a race on Sunday. There were some goofballs on the track today.”, and even Fireball Roberts, winner of the first race, stated that:

“I was scared to death out there,”

— Fireball Roberts,

Fireball Roberts and Joe Weatherly each won their respective 100-mile (160 km) qualifying events.

Qualifying race results

First qualifier

1. Fireball Roberts '61 Pontiac
2. Jim Paschal '61 Pontiac
3. Jack Smith '61 Pontiac
4. Buck Baker '61 Chrysler
5. Ned Jarrett '61 Chevrolet
6. Bobby Johns '61 Ford
7. Nelson Stacy '61 Ford
8. Bob Burdick '61 Pontiac
9. Paul Goldsmith '61 Pontiac
10. Junior Johnson '61 Pontiac (crashed)

Second qualifier

1. Joe Weatherly '61 Pontiac
2. Marvin Panch '60 Pontiac
3. Cotton Owens '61 Pontiac
4. Banjo Matthews '61 Ford
5. Darel Dieringer '61 Pontiac
6. Joe Lee Johnson '61 Chevrolet
7. Emanuel Zervakis '61 Chevrolet
8. Jim Reed '61 Chevrolet
9. Tom Pistone '61 Pontiac
10. Don O'Dell '61 Pontiac

== Race summary ==
Prior to the start of the main event, drivers were apprehensive due to the large number of mishaps during the qualifying races. This prompted officials to hold a meeting explaining that rough driving would not be tolerated, and during the race, two cars were black-flagged for driving too slowly to be considered safe. A total of 51,287 fans arrived in Daytona to witness the race which was run at an average speed of 149.601 mph (240.759 km/h). Unofficial estimates placed the total in attendance at over 65,000 people, with speculation of perhaps 100,000. Seventeen drivers in the starting field were designated rookies by NASCAR, and were identified by having their rear bumpers painted with 'Day-glo' paint. Smokey Yunick instructed Panch to not run too close to teammate Roberts so that if Roberts were caught up in any altercations on the track then both cars would not risk being taken out in the same incident.

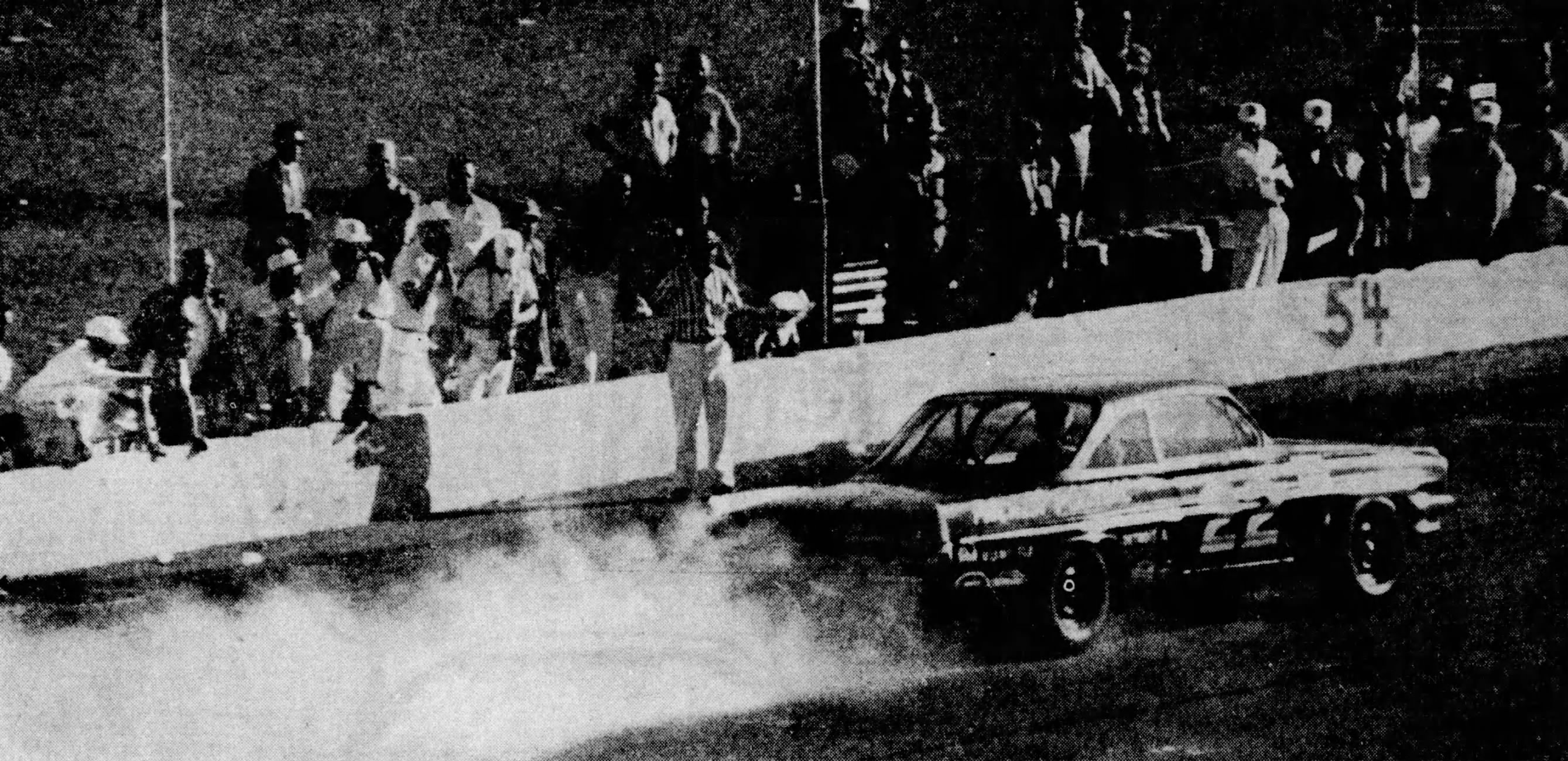
Roberts pitting due to his failing engine

Fireball Roberts started on the pole for the 500-mile (800 km) event, with Joe Weatherly on the outside front row. Roberts jumped out front and held the lead through lap 12 when Banjo Mathews took the point position. Roberts traded the lead position with Mathews, Junior Johnson, Nelson Stacy for the first 42 laps. At lap 43 Roberts took command of the race in dominating style; and continued to lead for the majority of the race, building a lead of 2 laps over the rest of the field. Although Richard Petty did not start the race, he did drive in relief for Bob Wellborn from lap 120 through 169, after which Wellborn resumed the driving duties. On lap 182 driver Darel Dieringer contacted the outside fence, but managed to make repairs in time to finish the race. There were a total of nine lead changes between five drivers, and the race was completed without a single caution. Roberts would come back and lead a total of 170 of the 200 laps, including 145 consecutive laps from the 45th to the 187th. Then on lap 187, with more than a two-lap lead on second place teammate Panch, Roberts' engine failed knocking him out of the race. Marvin Panch took his first lead of the race with only 13 laps remaining, and held on to reach the checkered flag first, 16 seconds ahead of second-place finisher Joe Weatherly's number 8, who completed the race on one set of tires. The caution-free event was one of only 3 times that the iconic race ran the entire distance under green; with 1959 and 1962 being the only other 2 times it's occurred.

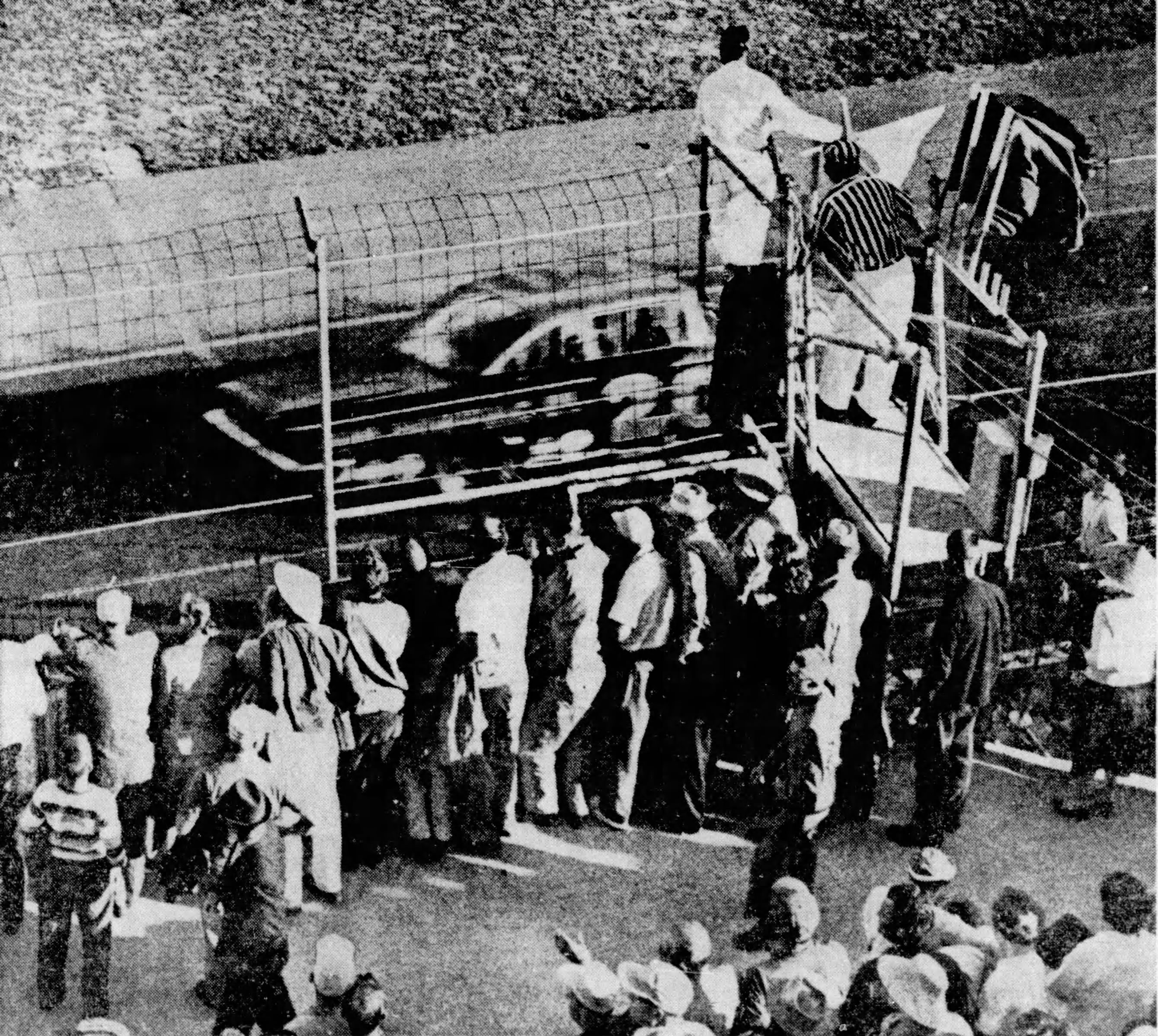
Panch crossing the finish line

While Pontiac's factory heads had wanted a new year model to win the race, car owner Yunick was so pleased with Panch's performance that he upped his promised take of 40% to 50% of the winnings, saying: "Tell you what. Anybody good enough to win the race is worth 50 percent to me." Panch completed the 500 miles (800 km) with only one change of tires, and in a then-record for a 500-mile (800 km) closed course race of any kind, completed the contest in 3 hours, 20 minutes, and 32 seconds. That time equated to an average speed of 149.601 mph (240.759 km/h), which was more than 2 mph (3.2 km/h) faster the pole qualifier of the Indianapolis 500 that same year. (Note: Eddie Sachs was the 1961 Indy 500 fastest qualifier with a speed of 147.480 mph (237.346 km/h). see: Indianapolis 500 starting grid – 1961) Since Daytona did not have a designated "Victory lane" at the time, after the race Panch pulled his winning car into the infield grass, and celebrated the win with Bill France Sr., Yunick, and his family. The victory was Panch's first NASCAR win since the 1957 season, and the only victory of the 1961 season. Years after retiring from the sport, Panch would rebuild a replica of his winning Pontiac and tour the NASCAR circuit.

=== 500 Race results ===
Fin	St	#	Driver	Sponsor / Owner	Car	Laps	Money	Laps led
1	4	20	Marvin Panch	Smokey Yunick	1960 Pontiac	200	$21,050.00	13
2	2	8	Joe Weatherly	Stephens Pontiac (Bud Moore)	1961 Pontiac	200	$9,150.00	0
3	17	31	Paul Goldsmith	Diesi Pontiac (Ray Nichels)	1961 Pontiac	200	$5,900.00	0
4	45	80	Fred Lorenzen	Tubby Gonzales	1961 Ford	198	$3,825.00	0
5	6	6	Cotton Owens	Cotton Owens	1961 Pontiac	198	$2,975.00	0
6	5	47	Jack Smith	Jack Smith	1961 Pontiac	197	$2,075.00	0
7	9	11	Ned Jarrett	Dash-Dash-Dash Corp. (B.G. Holloway)	1961 Chevrolet	196	$1,550.00	0
8	47	69	Johnny Allen	B.G. Holloway	1961 Chevrolet	196	$1,050.00	0
9	7	87	Buck Baker	Buck Baker	1961 Chrysler	196	$850.00	0
10	18	59	Tom Pistone	B.G. Holloway	1961 Pontiac	196	$750.00	0
11	29	49	Bob Welborn	Bob Welborn	1961 Pontiac	194	$600.00	0
12	41	4	Rex White	Rex White	1961 Chevrolet	194	$500.00	0
13	16	7	Jim Reed	Jim Reed	1961 Chevrolet	194	$400.00	0
14	46	23	Sal Tovella	Bob Rose	1961 Ford	191	$350.00	0
15	22	65	Charlie Glotzbach	Melvin Black	1961 Pontiac	191	$350.00	0
16	10	32	Darel Dieringer	Ray Nichels	1961 Pontiac	191	$325.00	0
17	32	52	Tom Dill	Julian Buesink	1961 Ford	190	$325.00	0
18	14	85	Emanuel Zervakis	Toots Transfer (Monroe Shook)	1961 Chevrolet	189	$300.00	0
19	49	37	Joe Kelly	Don House	1961 Ford	188	$300.00	0
20	1	22	Fireball Roberts	Smokey Yunick	1961 Pontiac	187	$4,750.00	170
21	30	66	David Pearson	Tony Lavati	1961 Pontiac	186	$200.00	0
22	37	30	Friday Hassler	Fred Clark	1960 Chevrolet	186	$200.00	0
23	57	41	Elmo Henderson	Charlie Chapman	1960 Ford	184	$200.00	0
24	31	83	Tim Flock	Meilwain Ford (Jack Meeks)	1961 Ford	184	$200.00	0
25	38	16	Elmo Langley	Happy Steigel	1959 Pontiac	184	$200.00	0
26	50	88	Harlan Richardson	Jim White	1961 Ford	184	$200.00	0
27	8	94	Banjo Matthews	Warrior Motel (Banjo Matthews)	1961 Ford	181	$250.00	3
28	26	91	Robert Roeber	R.G. Henschel	1960 Pontiac	180	$200.00	0
29	34	68	Ed Livingston	Curtis Crider	1960 Ford	177	$200.00	0
30	24	54	Jimmy Pardue	Jimmy Pardue	1960 Chevrolet	176	$200.00	0
31	36	40	Bobby Allison	Ralph Stark	1960 Chevrolet	175	$200.00	0
32	53	64	Paul Parks	Spook Crawford	1960 Ford	173	$200.00	0
33	27	24	Roscoe Thompson	James Turner	1960 Pontiac	169	$200.00	0
34	39	19	Herman Beam	Herman Beam	1960 Ford	167	$200.00	0
35	40	33	Reb Wickersham	Reb Wickersham	1960 Oldsmobile	158	$200.00	0
36	15	53	Bob Burdick	McKenzie (Roy Burdick)	1961 Pontiac	157	$200.00	0
37	12	89	Joe Lee Johnson	Joe Lee Johnson	1961 Chevrolet	153	$200.00	0
38	25	76	Larry Frank	Dick Wright	1960 Ford	152	$200.00	0
39	48	1	Paul Lewis	Jess Potter	1961 Chevrolet	149	$200.00	0
40	28	86	Buddy Baker	Buck Baker	1961 Chrysler	145	$200.00	0
41	54	39	Marshall Sargent	Marshall Sargent	1959 Pontiac	115	$200.00	0
42	58	36	Brian Naylor	Warner Brothers	1960 Ford	85	$200.00	0
43	56	38	Ed Markstellar	Matt DeMatthews	1961 Ford	81	$200.00	0
44	13	29	Nelson Stacy	Holt-Stacy (Dudley Farrell)	1961 Ford	79	$200.00	7
45	19	2	Tommy Irwin	Tom Daniels	1960 Chevrolet	67	$200.00	0
46	35	18	Darrell Dake	Weldon Wagner	1961 Chevrolet	47	$200.00	0
47	43	27	Junior Johnson	Holly Farms (Rex Lovette)	1960 Pontiac	44	$300.00	7
48	51	15	Red Hollingsworth	Red Hollingsworth	1960 Chevrolet	35	$200.00	0
49	3	3	Jim Paschal	Daytona Kennel (John Masoni)	1961 Pontiac	30	$200.00	0
50	11	72	Bobby Johns	Shorty Johns	1961 Ford	26	$200.00	0
51	55	60	George Tet	Tetsuo Fuchigami	1960 Ford	24	$200.00	0
52	21	10	T.C. Hunt	Fred Wheat	1960 Dodge	23	$200.00	0
53	23	62	Curtis Crider	Curtis Crider	1960 Ford	12	$200.00	0
54	20	75	Don O'Dell	J.D. Braswell	1961 Pontiac	10	$200.00	0
55	33	21	Curtis Turner	Courtesy (Wood Brothers)	1961 Ford	6	$200.00	0
56	44	99	Wilbur Rakestraw	Joe Jones	1961 Ford	5	$200.00	0
57	52	55	Ernie Gahan	John Koszela	1959 Chevrolet	3	$200.00	0
58	42	50	Ken Johnson	James French	1960 Ford	3	$200.00	0

- Race results from racing-reference.info

1961 Grand National

Seasons
- ← 1960 1962 →
