= Maurice Petty =

American NASCAR crew chief (1939–2020)

- Petty c. 1970
- Born: March 27, 1939; Level Cross, North Carolina, U.S.
- Died: July 25, 2020 (aged 81)
- Awards: International Motorsports Hall of Fame (2011); NASCAR Hall of Fame (2014)

NASCAR Cup Series career
- 26 races run over 5 years
- Best finish: 57th (1962)
- First race: 1960 Race 28 (Dixie)
- Last race: 1964 Joe Weatherly 150 (Occoneechee)
Wins	Top tens	Poles
0	16	0

Maurice Petty (March 27, 1939 – July 25, 2020) was an American NASCAR crew chief and engine builder for Petty Enterprises, of which he was part owner. He was inducted into the International Motorsports Hall of Fame in 2011. He was subsequently enshrined into the NASCAR Hall of Fame in 2014. He was the first engine builder to be inducted into that Hall.

== Early life ==
Petty was born in Level Cross, North Carolina, on March 27, 1939. As a child, he would follow his father, Lee Petty, to the race track. The younger Petty's mechanical skills were credited as having played an "integral part" in his father's success. Although he himself started 26 times in the NASCAR Cup Series between 1960 and 1964, he soon elected to focus on engine building.

== Career ==
Petty Enterprises was founded by Lee Petty and his two sons. The Petty family, working together as a team, corporately won over 250 races. Maurice primarily served the organization as engine builder and crew chief. He raced for the organization in 26 competitions from 1960 to 1964. As a driver, his best finish was third place at the Piedmont Interstate Fairgrounds in Spartanburg, South Carolina in 1961. In 1970, Petty was the crew chief for Pete Hamilton, who won three races for Petty Enterprises, including the 1970 Daytona 500 and both races at Talladega Superspeedway. As an engine builder, Maurice built the motors that helped his brother Richard win a record 200 victories, along with seven Cup Series championships.

In 2011, Maurice Petty was inducted into the International Motorsports Hall of Fame in Talladega, Alabama, in recognition of his career as a team owner, engine builder, crew chief, and driver. Three years later, he was enshrined into the NASCAR Hall of Fame. He became the first engine builder to be inducted into that Hall, as well as the fourth member from Petty Enterprises.

== Personal life and death ==
Maurice (left) with Lee (center) and Richard in 1964

Petty was the younger brother of Richard Petty, who depended on his engines throughout the latter's career. He was also the uncle of Kyle Petty and Trent Owens, and the great-uncle of Adam Petty. Maurice was married to Patricia for 52 years, until her death in 2014. Maurice had three sons: Timmy, Mark and Ritchie. Maurice Petty suffered from polio as a child, and ongoing effects of the illness resulted in him becoming less mobile, which played a role in his retirement from the Petty Enterprises team.

Petty died on the morning of July 25, 2020, at age 81. The cause of death was undisclosed.

== Honors and awards ==
- 2011: International Motorsports Hall of Fame inductee
- 2013: NASCAR Hall of Fame nominee
- 2014: NASCAR Hall of Fame Class of 2014

== Motorsports career results ==
=== NASCAR ===
(key) (Bold – Pole position awarded by qualifying time. Italics – Pole position earned by points standings or practice time. * – Most laps led.)

==== Grand National Series ====
NASCAR Grand National Series results
Year	Team	No.	Make	1	2	3	4	5	6	7	8	9	10	11	12	13	14	15	16	17	18	19	20	21	22	23	24	25	26	27	28	29	30	31	32	33	34	35	36	37	38	39	40	41	42	43	44	45	46	47	48	49	50	51	52	53	54	55	56	57	58	59	60	61	62	NGNC	Pts
1960	Petty Enterprises	44	Plymouth	CLT	CLB	DAY	DAY	DAY	CLT	NWS	PHO	CLB	MAR	HCY	WIL	BGS	GPS	AWS	DAR	PIF	HBO	RCH	HMS	CLT	BGS	DAY	HEI	MAB	MBS	ATL	BIR; 8	NSV	AWS	PIF	CLB	SBO	BGS	DAR	HCY	CSF	GSP	HBO	MAR	NWS	CLT																					94th	304
1960	Petty Enterprises	42	Plymouth																																											RCH; 9	ATL																			94th	304
1961	Petty Enterprises	43	Plymouth	CLT	JSP	DAY	DAY	DAY	PIF	AWS	HMS	ATL	GPS	HBO; 15																																								GPS; 7												59th	–
1961	Petty Enterprises	42	Plymouth												BGS; 14	MAR	NWS	CLB	HCY	RCH	MAR	DAR	CLT	CLT	RSD	ASP	CLT	PIF; 3	BIR	GPS; 7	BGS; 13	NOR	HAS	STR	DAY	ATL	CLB	MBS; 18	BRI	NSV															HBO; 4											59th	–
1961	Petty Enterprises	44	Plymouth																																						BGS; 21	AWS	RCH	SBO	DAR	HCY	RCH	CSF	ATL	MAR	NWS	CLT	BRI													59th	–
1962	Petty Enterprises	43	Plymouth	CON; 26	AWS	DAY	DAY	DAY	CON																																																									57th	1278
1962	Petty Enterprises	41	Plymouth							AWS; 4	SVH	HBO; 6	RCH	CLB	NWS	GPS	MBS	MAR	BGS	BRI; 19	RCH	HCY	CON; 5	DAR	PIF	CLT	ATL	BGS	AUG	RCH	SBO	DAY	CLB	ASH	GPS	AUG	SVH	MBS	BRI	CHT	NSV	HUN	AWS	STR	BGS	PIF	VAL	DAR	HCY	RCH	DTS	AUG	MAR	NWS	CLT	ATL										57th	1278
1963	Petty Enterprises	42	Plymouth	BIR; 14	GGS; 6	THS; 5	RSD	DAY	DAY	DAY	PIF	AWS	HBO	ATL	HCY	BRI	AUG	RCH	GPS	SBO	BGS	MAR	NWS																																											74th	944
1963	Petty Enterprises	43	Plymouth																					CLB; 20	THS	DAR	ODS	RCH	CLT	BIR	ATL	DAY	MBS	SVH	DTS	BGS	ASH	OBS	BRR	BRI	GPS	NSV	CLB	AWS	PIF	BGS	ONA	DAR	HCY	RCH	MAR	DTS	NWS	THS	CLT	SBO	HBO	RSD								74th	944
1964	Petty Enterprises	41	Plymouth	CON; 5	AUG	JSP; DNQ						RCH; 7	BRI	GPS; 7	BGS	ATL	AWS; 6	HBO; 22	PIF	CLB	NWS	MAR	SVH	DAR	LGY	HCY	SBO	CLT	GPS	ASH	ATL	CON	NSV	CHT	BIR	VAL	PIF	DAY	ODS	OBS	BRR	ISP	GLN	LIN	BRI	NSV	MBS	AWS	DTS	ONA	CLB	BGS	STR	DAR	HCY	RCH	ODS	HBO	MAR	SVH	NWS	CLT	HAR	AUG	JAC	61st	1760
1964	Petty Enterprises	42	Plymouth				SVH; 4	RSD	DAY	DAY	DAY																																																							61st	1760
