= Ernie Gahan =

- Born: Ernest E. Gahan; October 12, 1926 Wakefield, Massachusetts, U.S.
- Died: November 27, 2009 (aged 83) Berwick, Maine, U.S.
- Retired: 1976

Modified racing career
- Debut season: 1947
- Car number: 50
- Wins: 300+

Championship titles
- 1966 NASCAR National Modified Champion

Awards
- Carnegie Hero

NASCAR Cup Series career
- 11 races run over 4 years
- Best finish: 45th (1962)
- First race: 1960 Martinsville Speedway
- Last race: 1966 Oxford Plains Speedway
| Wins | Top tens | Poles |
|---|---|---|
| 0 | 2 | 0 |

Ernest E. Gahan (October 12, 1926 – November 27, 2009) was an American stock car racing driver. He spent the majority of his career racing in the Modified division, and won the 1966 NASCAR Modified Championship.

== Racing career ==
Gahan started racing in 1947 at the Dover Speedway, New Hampshire, and regularly competed at the renowned tracks of the northeast including Cheshire Fairgrounds, New Hampshire; Stafford Motor Speedway, Connecticut; and in New York at Fonda Speedway and Utica-Rome Speedway in Vernon. He made eleven appearances in the NASCAR Grand National Series between 1960 and 1966 with a best finish of sixth at the Piedmont Interstate Fairgrounds, South Carolina.

Gahan was inducted into the New England Auto Racers, the New York State Stock Car Association, and the Northeast Dirt Modified Halls of Fame.

== Carnegie Hero ==
Gahan along with four others rescued Marvin Panch from a burning race car at the Daytona International Speedway on February 14, 1963, and each received the prestigious Carnegie Medal for their heroism. That same year, Gahan pulled fellow racer Bill Wimble from a burning wreck during a race in Syracuse, New York.

== Motorsports career results ==
=== NASCAR ===
(key) (Bold – Pole position awarded by qualifying time. Italics – Pole position earned by points standings or practice time. * – Most laps led.)

==== Grand National Series ====
NASCAR Grand National Series results
| Year | Team | No. | Make | 1 | 2 | 3 | 4 | 5 | 6 | 7 | 8 | 9 | 10 | 11 | 12 | 13 | 14 | 15 | 16 | 17 | 18 | 19 | 20 | 21 | 22 | 23 | 24 | 25 | 26 | 27 | 28 | 29 | 30 | 31 | 32 | 33 | 34 | 35 | 36 | 37 | 38 | 39 | 40 | 41 | 42 | 43 | 44 | 45 | 46 | 47 | 48 | 49 | 50 | 51 | 52 | 53 | NGNC | Pts | Ref |
|---|---|---|---|---|---|---|---|---|---|---|---|---|---|---|---|---|---|---|---|---|---|---|---|---|---|---|---|---|---|---|---|---|---|---|---|---|---|---|---|---|---|---|---|---|---|---|---|---|---|---|---|---|---|---|---|---|---|---|---|
| 1960 | Ernie Gahan | 55 | Chevy | CLT | CLB | DAY | DAY | DAY | CLT | NWS | PHO | CLB | MAR; 15 | HCY | WIL | BGS | GPS | AWS | DAR | PIF | HBO | RCH | HMS | CLT; 13 | BGS | DAY | HEI | MAB | MBS | ATL | BIR | NSV | AWS | PIF | CLB | SBO | BGS | DAR | HCY | CSF | GSP | HBO | MAR | NWS | CLT | RCH | ATL | | | | | | | | | | 46th | 2080 | |
| 1961 | John Koszela | 55 | Chevy | CLT | JSP | DAY; 23 | DAY | DAY; 57 | PIF; 6 | AWS | HMS | ATL | GPS | HBO | BGS | MAR; 16 | NWS | CLB | HCY | RCH | MAR | DAR | CLT | CLT | RSD | ASP | CLT | PIF | BIR | GPS | BGS | NOR; 11 | HAS | STR | DAY | ATL | CLB | MBS | BRI | NSV | BGS | AWS | RCH | SBO | DAR | HCY | RCH | CSF | ATL | MAR | NWS | CLT | BRI | GPS | HBO | | 88th | 810 | |
| 1962 | Rocky Hinton | 84 | Ford | CON | AWS | DAY; 9 | DAY | DAY; 12 | CON | AWS | SVH | HBO | RCH; 19 | CLB | NWS | GPS | MBS | MAR | BGS | BRI | RCH | HCY | CON | DAR | PIF | CLT | ATL | BGS | AUG | RCH | SBO | DAY | CLB | ASH | GPS | AUG | SVH | MBS | BRI | CHT | NSV | HUN | AWS | STR | BGS | PIF | VAL | DAR | HCY | RCH | DTS | AUG | MAR | NWS | CLT | ATL | 45th | 2092 | |
| 1966 | Joan Petre | 73 | Ford | AUG | RSD | DAY | DAY | DAY | CAR | BRI | ATL | HCY | CLB | GPS | BGS | NWS | MAR | DAR | LGY | MGR | MON | RCH | CLT | DTS | ASH | PIF | SMR | AWS | BLV | GPS | DAY | ODS | BRR | OXF; 19 | FON | ISP | BRI | SMR | NSV | ATL | CLB | AWS | BLV | BGS | DAR | HCY | RCH | HBO | MAR | NWS | CLT | CAR | | | | | 111th | 112 | |

===== Daytona 500 =====
| Year | Team | Manufacturer | Start | Finish |
|---|---|---|---|---|
| 1961 | John Koszela | Chevrolet | 52 | 57 |
| 1962 | Rocky Hinton | Ford | 16 | 12 |
