= 1962 Volunteer 500 =

Auto race held at Bristol International Speedway in 1962

Race details
- Race 17 of 53 in the 1962 NASCAR Grand National Series season
- Layout of Bristol Motor Speedway
- Date: April 29, 1962
- Official name: Volunteer 500
- Location: Bristol International Speedway, Bristol, Tennessee
- Course: Permanent racing facility
- Course length: 0.533 miles (0.857 km)
- Distance: 500 laps, 266.5 mi (428.8 km)
- Weather: Warm with temperatures of 79 °F (26 °C); wind speeds of 14 miles per hour (23 km/h)
- Average speed: 73.397 mph (118.121 km/h)
- Attendance: 17,000

Pole position
| Driver | Fireball Roberts | Banjo Matthews |
- Time: 22.120 seconds

Most laps led
| Driver | Bobby Johns | Shorty Johns |
- Laps: 430

Winner
| No. 72 | Bobby Johns | Shorty Johns |

Television in the United States
- Network: untelevised
- Announcers: none

The 1962 Volunteer 500 was a NASCAR Grand National Series event that was held on April 29, 1962, at Bristol International Speedway in Bristol, Tennessee.

The transition to purpose-built racecars began in the early 1960s and occurred gradually over that decade. Changes made to the sport by the late 1960s brought an end to the "strictly stock" vehicles of the 1950s.

== Race report ==
This 500-lap event lasted for a duration of three hours and 24 minutes. Thirty-six drivers managed to qualify for this racing event; with Fireball Roberts earning a pole position start due to his qualifying speed of 81.374 miles per hour (130.959 km/h). Bobby Johns would beat out the likes of Richard Petty and Fireball Roberts by six laps; a dominating performance made possible by running the high line when nobody else wanted to run up high so he didn't get held up nearly as much as everyone else. This was the only time in Herman Beam's career that he got a top ten in a race with more than thirty cars starting. Granted, only eleven actually finished.

Johns would later credit his win in this event to having a sense of consistency; rather than accelerating the car to full throttle all the time. Johns' vehicle was unsponsored during an era where corporate sponsorships for NASCAR vehicles were very few and far in-between.

Larry Frank was the last-place finisher of this event due to his car overheating on lap 29. George Green would become the final driver to finish the event while David Pearson's faulty lug bolts would prevent him from acquiring a "top five" finish. Most of the vehicles in this race were Pontiac or Chevrolet. All of the drivers were born in the United States of America; no foreigners attempted to qualify for this racing event. Johnny Allen relieved Jack Smith in the #47 and received the checkered flag.

While there are only four cautions to this race, an incredibly long duration of 37 laps were spent under the caution flag due to the various accidents and incidents that happened during the race. Gene Blackburn would retire from NASCAR Cup Series racing after this event.

Individual earnings for each driver ranged from the winner's share of $4,405 ($46,885 when adjusted for inflation) to the meager earnings of $100 ($1,064 when adjusted for inflation) that was given to several low-ranked drivers. NASCAR only authorized a total sum of $17,865 to the qualifying drivers of this event ($190,147 when adjusted for inflation).

At least eight notable crew chiefs were in attendance for this race; including Bud Moore, Herman Beam, Glen Wood, Ratus Walters and Shorty Johns.

=== Qualifying ===
| Grid | No. | Driver | Manufacturer | Speed | Qualifying time | Owner |
|---|---|---|---|---|---|---|
| 1 | 22 | Fireball Roberts | '62 Pontiac | 81.374 | 22.120 | Banjo Matthews |
| 2 | 28 | Fred Lorenzen | '62 Ford | 80.789 | 22.280 | Holman-Moody |
| 3 | 21 | Marvin Panch | '62 Ford | 80.645 | 22.320 | Wood Brothers |
| 4 | 29 | Nelson Stacy | '62 Ford | 80.609 | 22.330 | Holman-Moody |
| 5 | 27 | Junior Johnson | '62 Pontiac | 80.285 | 22.420 | Rex Lovette |
| 6 | 72 | Bobby Johns | '62 Pontiac | 80.178 | 22.450 | Shorty Johns |
| 7 | 54 | Jimmy Pardue | '62 Pontiac | 80.000 | 22.500 | Jimmy Pardue |
| 8 | 8 | Joe Weatherly | '62 Pontiac | 79.787 | 22.560 | Bud Moore |
| 9 | 4 | Rex White | '62 Chevrolet | 79.787 | 22.560 | Rex White |
| 10 | 47 | Jack Smith | '62 Pontiac | 79.751 | 22.570 | Jack Smith |

=== Major wrecks ===
The first major wreck of the race occurred when Nelson Stacy, on his 302nd lap, skidded into the second-turn guardrail after the '62 Ford had blown a tire. It bounced back on the track in time to be hit by Maurice Petty's '62 Plymouth. Stacy was shaken up, got a few minor bruises, and was sent to the hospital for observation. He was released before the race ended.

The second major wreck occurred when cars driven by Ned Jarrett and George Green collided on the fourth turn. Nobody was hurt. Both cars were badly damaged and hauled off the track by the wreckers. They were quickly repaired, however, and they got back into the race and were running at the finish.

== Top 20 finishers ==
| Pos | No. | Driver | Manufacturer | Laps | Laps led | Time/Status |
|---|---|---|---|---|---|---|
| 1 | 72 | Bobby Johns | Pontiac | 500 | 430 | 3:24:22 |
| 2 | 22 | Fireball Roberts | Pontiac | 494 | 61 | +6 laps |
| 3 | 47 | Jack Smith | Pontiac | 492 | 0 | +8 laps |
| 4 | 11 | Ned Jarrett | Chevrolet | 475 | 0 | +25 laps |
| 5 | 60 | Tom Cox | Plymouth | 470 | 0 | +30 laps |
| 6 | 19 | Herman Beam | Ford | 469 | 0 | +31 laps |
| 7 | 6 | David Pearson | Pontiac | 461 | 0 | Missing lug bolts |
| 8 | 34 | Wendell Scott | Chevrolet | 460 | 0 | +40 laps |
| 9 | 61 | Bill Morton | Ford | 459 | 0 | +41 laps |
| 10 | 62 | Curtis Crider | Mercury | 447 | 0 | +53 laps |
| 11 | 8 | Joe Weatherly | Pontiac | 444 | 0 | Missing rear end |
| 12 | 86 | Buddy Baker | Chrysler | 430 | 0 | Engine problems |
| 13 | 54 | Jimmy Pardue | Pontiac | 419 | 0 | +81 laps |
| 14 | 1 | George Green | Chevrolet | 417 | 0 | +83 laps |
| 15 | 17 | Fred Harb | Ford | 370 | 0 | Head gasket problems |
| 16 | 43 | Richard Petty | Plymouth | 368 | 9 | Engine problems |
| 17 | 26 | Bunkie Blackburn | Pontiac | 359 | 0 | Missing rear end |
| 18 | 29 | Nelson Stacy | Ford | 302 | 0 | Terminal vehicle damage |
| 19 | 41 | Maurice Petty | Plymouth | 297 | 0 | Terminal vehicle damage |
| 20 | 64 | Gene Blackburn | Chevrolet | 274 | 0 | Axle problems |

== Timeline ==
Section reference:

- Start of race: Fireball Roberts starts the race with the pole position.
- Lap 29: Larry Frank managed to overheat his vehicle.
- Lap 60: Larry Thomas fell out with engine failure.
- Lap 61: Fred Lorenzen fell out with engine failure.
- Lap 62: Bobby Johns takes over the lead from Fireball Roberts.
- Lap 68: Ralph Earnhardt managed to overheat his vehicle.
- Lap 81: Oil pressure issues forced Stick Elliott out of the race.
- Lap 160: Richard Petty takes over the lead from Bobby Johns.
- Lap 161: G.C. Spencer fell out with engine failure.
- Lap 163: Bobby Johns takes over the lead from Richard Petty.
- Lap 191: The oil line started acting strangely on Darel Dieringer's vehicle.
- Lap 223: Joe Lee Johnson fell out with engine failure.
- Lap 225: Johnny Allen fell out with engine failure.
- Lap 297: Maurice Petty had a terminal crash, forcing him to exit the event.
- Lap 302: Nelson Stacy had a terminal crash, forcing him to exit the event.
- Lap 321: Richard Petty takes over the lead from Bobby Johns.
- Lap 327: Bobby Johns takes over the lead from Richard Petty.
- Lap 359: Bunkie Blackburn noticed that the rear end of his vehicle was missing.
- Lap 368: Richard Petty fell out with engine failure.
- Lap 370: Fred Harb noticed that the head gasket of his vehicle was loose.
- Lap 430: Buck Baker's engine would stop working properly, causing him not to finish the race.
- Lap 444: The rear end of Joe Weatherly's vehicle came off, forcing him to exit the race.
- Lap 461: Problems with his lug bolts forced David Pearson to exit the race prematurely.
- Finish: Bobby Johns was officially declared the winner of the event.
