= 1963 Turkey Day 200 =

Auto race held at Tar Heel Speedway in 1962

Race details
- Race 3 of 55 in the 1963 NASCAR Grand National Series season
- Date: November 22, 1962; 64 years ago
- Official name: Turkey Day 200
- Location: Tar Heel Speedway, Randleman, North Carolina
- Course: Permanent racing facility
- Course length: 0.250 miles (0.500 km)
- Distance: 200 laps, 50 mi (80 km)
- Weather: Chilly with temperatures of 62.1 °F (16.7 °C); wind speeds of 20 miles per hour (32 km/h)
- Average speed: 47.5444 miles per hour (76.5153 km/h)

Pole position
Driver	Glen Wood	Wood Brothers Racing

Most laps led
Driver	Glen Wood	Wood Brothers Racing
- Laps: 173

Winner
No. 41	Jim Paschal	Petty Enterprises

The 1963 Turkey Day 200 was a NASCAR Grand National Series event that was held on November 22, 1962, at Tar Heel Speedway in Randleman, North Carolina.

The transition to purpose-built racecars began in the early 1960s and occurred gradually over that decade. Changes made to the sport by the late 1960s brought an end to the "strictly stock" vehicles of the 1950s.

== Race report ==
This race, while being in the 1963 season happened after November 1, 1962. This put the racing event in the 1963 points season. Since 2001, NASCAR has never organized a race this late in the year for its NASCAR Cup Series because NASCAR now mandates a 12-week silly season. While the focus may have been on the Pettys it was another fast family in control for much of the race as Glen Wood dominated in the Wood Brothers entry until the famous #21 Ford blew an engine. With Wood on the sidelines, Jim Paschal and his hometown Petty Enterprise Plymouth sped to victory.

Richard Petty's first home race was unsuccessful as he retired with a transmission failure. However the family did have success as in addition to Paschal's win Richard's mechanic brother Maurice Petty, racing with Lee's #42, turned in a top-5 run.

Being a ¼-mile track, the entire race only spanned 50 miles (80 km). Three thousand and five hundred people attended this live racing event which ended in one hour and three minutes. Twenty-three American drivers and one Canadian driver (Jim Bray) participated in this race. Notable speeds were: 47.544 miles per hour (76.515 km/h) for the average speed and 51.933 miles per hour (83.578 km/h) for the pole position speeds. These slow speeds would not look out of place on a modern-day American Interstate highway.

The winner (Jim Paschal who raced for Petty Enterprises) would receive $575 in winnings ($6,047 when considering inflation) while the last place driver (Ned Jarrett) would walk away with $100 in prize winnings ($1,052 when considering inflation). Glen Wood would lead the most laps (173) before finishing the race in 15th place due to an engine problem.

Herman Beam would be his own crew chief during the race while Leonard Wood was Glen Wood's crew chief.

=== Qualifying ===
Grid	No.	Driver	Manufacturer	Owner
1	21	Glen Wood	'62 Ford	Wood Brothers Racing
2	41	Jim Paschal	'62 Plymouth	Petty Enterprises
3	49	Jimmy Pardue	'62 Pontiac	J.C. Parker
4	11	Ned Jarrett	'62 Ford	Charles Robinson
5	43	Richard Petty	'62 Plymouth	Petty Enterprises
6	42	Maurice Petty	'62 Plymouth	Petty Enterprises
7	8	Joe Weatherly	'62 Pontiac	Bud Moore
8	44	Tommy Irwin	'62 Ford	Stewart McKinney
9	1	George Green	'62 Chevrolet	Jess Potter
10	62	Curtis Crider	'62 Mercury	Curtis Crider

=== Finishing order ===
Section reference:

1. Jim Paschal† (No. 41)
2. Joe Weatherly† (No. 8)
3. Tommy Irwin (No. 44)
4. David Pearson† (No. 6)
5. Maurice Petty† (No. 42)
6. Curtis Crider† (No. 62)
7. Sherman Utsman† (No. 61)
8. Jimmy Pardue† (No. 49)
9. George Green† (No. 1)
10. Wendell Scott† (No. 34)
11. Richard Petty* (No. 43)
12. Jack Deniston (No. 33)
13. Ray Hughes (No. 60)
14. Billy Foster† (No. 2)
15. Glen Wood*† (No. 21)
16. Jim Bray (No. 5)
17. Sam Fogle (No. 31)
18. G.C. Spencer*† (No. 48)
19. Lyle Stetler* (No. 58)
20. Fred Harb*† (No. 17)
21. Herman Beam† (No. 19)
22. John Hoffman* (No. 32)
23. Larry Thomas*† (No. 36)
24. Ned Jarrett*† (No. 11)

† signifies that the driver is known to be deceased
* Driver failed to finish race

== Timeline ==
Section reference:

- Start of race: Glen Wood started the race with the pole position.
- Lap 6: Ned Jarrett had problems with his transmission, forcing him to withdraw from the event.
- Lap 27: Larry Thomas developed transmission problems in his vehicle, ending his day on the track.
- Lap 51: John Hoffman's vehicle became too dangerous to handle properly, causing him to leave the event early.
- Lap 117: Fred Harb's driveshaft issues made the vehicle unable to continue the race, securing an early exit for him.
- Lap 122: One of Lyle Stetler's tires went flat, forcing him to withdraw from the event.
- Lap 156: Oil pressure issues forced G.C. Spencer to exit the race prematurely.
- Lap 173: Glen Wood had problems with his vehicle's engine, forcing him out of the race.
- Lap 174: Jim Paschal took over the lead from Glen Wood.
- Lap 188: Richard Petty's vehicle was humbled by transmission problems, forcing him to accept an eleventh-place finish.
- Finish: Jim Paschal was officially declared the winner of the event.

Preceded by 1963 untitled race at Golden Gate Speedway	NASCAR Grand National Season; 1963	Succeeded by 1963 Riverside 500
