= Bill Wimble =

American racing driver

- Born: William R. Wimble; January 11, 1932 Lisbon, NY
- Died: April 24, 2016 (aged 84) Hillsborough, FL, U.S.
- Retired: 1968

Motorsports career
- Debut season: 1951
- Car number: 33
- Championships: 14

Championship titles
- 1960, 1961 NASCAR National Sportsman Champion

Awards
- Carnegie Hero

NASCAR Cup Series career
- 4 races run over 2 years
- Best finish: 48th (1962)
- First race: 1958 (Reading, PA)
- Last race: 1962 Daytona 500 (Daytona)
Wins	Top tens	Poles
0	0	0

William Wimble (January 11, 1932 – April 24, 2016) was an American stock car racing driver and two-time champion of the NASCAR Sportsman Division (predecessor of currently Xfinity Series).

== Racing career ==
Wimble began his racing career at the St. Lawrence Valley Speedway in Canton, New York in 1951, and finished his first race in last position. He was champion of the 1960 NASCAR Sportsman Division (predecessor of the O'Reilly Auto Parts Series) and along with Dick Nephew was 1961 co-champion. Folklore has it the 1961 “tie” was a fabrication designed to cover-up a mistake by NASCAR officials.

From 1958 to 1962, Wimble made four appearances in the NASCAR Grand National Series. He otherwise spent the majority of his career racing in the Sportsman and Modified classes at the renowned tracks of the New York including Airborne Park Speedway in Plattsburgh, Albany-Saratoga Speedway in Malta, Fonda Speedway, and Utica-Rome Speedway in Vernon.

Wimble won 14 track championships. He was inducted into the Eastern Motorsports Press Association Hall of Fame, the New England Auto Racers Hall of Fame, the New York State Stock Car Association Hall of Fame and the Northeast Dirt Modified Hall of Fame.

== Carnegie Hero ==
Wimble along with four others rescued Marvin Panch from a burning race car at the Daytona International Speedway on February 14, 1963, and each received the prestigious Carnegie Medal for their heroism.

That same year, Wimble was pulled from a burning wreck during a race in Syracuse, New York by fellow racer Ernie Gahan, who was also one of those responsible for saving Marvin Panch.

== Motorsports career results ==
=== NASCAR ===
(key) (Bold – Pole position awarded by qualifying time. Italics – Pole position earned by points standings or practice time. * – Most laps led.)

==== Grand National Series ====
NASCAR Grand National Series results
Year	Team	No.	Make	1	2	3	4	5	6	7	8	9	10	11	12	13	14	15	16	17	18	19	20	21	22	23	24	25	26	27	28	29	30	31	32	33	34	35	36	37	38	39	40	41	42	43	44	45	46	47	48	49	50	51	52	53	NGNC	Pts	Ref
1958	Lyle Sokoll	400	Ford	FAY	DAB	CON	FAY	WIL	HBO	FAY	CLB	PIF	ATL	CLT	MAR	ODS	OBS	GPS	GBF	STR	NWS	BGS	TRN	RSD	CLB	NBS	REF; 18	LIN	HCY	AWS	RSP	MCC	SLS	TOR	BUF																						114th	120.5	
1958	Lyle Sokoll	400	Chevy																																	MCF; 18	BEL	BRR	CLB	NSV	AWS	BGS	MBS	DAR	CLT	BIR	CSF	GAF	RCH	HBO	SAS	MAR	NWS	ATL			114th	120.5	
1962	Dave McCredy	32	Pontiac	CON	AWS	DAY; 17	DAY	DAY; 11	CON	AWS	SVH	HBO	RCH	CLB	NWS	GPS	MBS	MAR	BGS	BRI	RCH	HCY	CON	DAR	PIF	CLT	ATL	BGS	AUG	RCH	SBO	DAY	CLB	ASH	GPS	AUG	SVH	MBS	BRI	CHT	NSV	HUN	AWS	STR	BGS	PIF	VAL	DAR	HCY	RCH	DTS	AUG	MAR	NWS	CLT	ATL	48th	1944	

===== Daytona 500 =====
Year	Team	Manufacturer	Start	Finish
1962	Dave McCredy	Pontiac	36	11
