= 1962 NASCAR Grand National Series =

Seasons
- ← 1961 1963 →

The 1962 NASCAR Grand National Series was the 14th season of professional stock car racing in the United States. The season, which began on November 5, 1961 at Concord Speedway in Midland, North Carolina, was contested over 53 races. The season ended at Atlanta International Raceway in Hampton, Georgia, on October 28, 1962. Joe Weatherly was the drivers' champion. Tom Cox was the Rookie of the Year.

== Results ==
D Dirt oval
Piedmont P Paved oval

No	Date	Race	Track	Track type		Pole Position	Winning Driver	Report
No	Date	Race	Track	Pavement/shape	Length category	Pole Position	Winning Driver	Report
1	11/05/1961		Concord Speedway (Midland, NC)	P paved oval	short track	Joe Weatherly	Jack Smith	
2	11/12/1961		Asheville Weaverville Speedway (Weaverville, NC)	D dirt oval	short track	Joe Weatherly	Rex White	
3	02/16/1962	Twin 125 #1	Daytona International Speedway (Daytona Beach, FL)	T paved oval	long/high speed	Fireball Roberts	Fireball Roberts	Report
4	02/16/1962	Twin 125 #2	Daytona International Speedway (Daytona Beach, FL)	T paved oval	long/high speed	Darel Dieringer	Joe Weatherly	Report
5	02/18/1962	Daytona 500	Daytona International Speedway (Daytona Beach, FL)	T paved oval	long/high speed	Fireball Roberts	Fireball Roberts	Report
6	02/25/1962		Concord Speedway (Midland, NC)	P paved oval	short track		Joe Weatherly	
7	03/04/1962		Asheville Weaverville Speedway (Weaverville, NC)	D dirt oval	short track	Rex White	Joe Weatherly	
8	03/17/1962	St. Patrick's Day 200	Savannah Speedway (Savannah, GA)	D paved oval	short track	Rex White	Jack Smith	
9	03/18/1962		Orange Speedway (Hillsborough, NC)	D dirt oval	short track	Joe Weatherly	Rex White	
10	04/01/1962	Richmond 250	Richmond Raceway (Richmond, VA)	P paved oval	short track	Herman Beam	Rex White	
11	04/13/1962	Arclite 200	Columbia Speedway (Cayce, SC)	D dirt oval	short track	Joe Weatherly	Ned Jarrett	
12	04/15/1962	Gwyn Staley 400	North Wilkesboro Speedway (North Wilkesboro, NC)	P paved oval	short track	Junior Johnson	Richard Petty	
13	04/19/1962	Greenville 200	Greenville-Pickens Speedway (Easley, SC)	D dirt oval	short track	Ned Jarrett	Ned Jarrett	
14	04/21/1962		Rambi Raceway (Myrtle Beach, SC)	P paved oval	short track	Ned Jarrett	Jack Smith	
15	04/22/1962	Virginia 500	Martinsville Speedway (Manassas, VA)	D dirt oval	short track	Fred Lorenzen	Richard Petty	
16	04/23/1962		Bowman Gray Stadium (Winston-Salem, NC)	P paved oval	short track	Rex White	Rex White	
17	04/29/1962	Volunteer 500	Bristol International Speedway (Bristol, TN)	P paved oval	short track	Fireball Roberts	Bobby Johns	Report
18	05/04/1962		Southside Speedway (Midlothian, VA)	P paved oval	short track	Rex White	Jimmy Pardue	
19	05/05/1962	Hickory 250	Hickory Speedway (Hickory, NC)	D dirt oval	short track	Jack Smith	Jack Smith	
20	05/06/1962		Concord Speedway (Midland, NC)	P paved oval	short track	Richard Petty	Joe Weatherly	
21	05/12/1962	Rebel 300	Darlington Raceway (Darlington, SC)	P paved oval	intermediate	Fred Lorenzen	Nelson Stacy	
22	05/19/1962		Piedmont Interstate Fairgrounds (Spartanburg, SC)	D dirt oval	short track	Cotton Owens	Ned Jarrett	
23	05/27/1962	World 600	Charlotte Motor Speedway (Concord, NC)	D paved oval	intermediate	Fireball Roberts	Nelson Stacy	Report
24	06/10/1962	Atlanta 500	Atlanta Motor Speedway (Hampton, GA)	D paved oval	intermediate	Banjo Matthews	Fred Lorenzen	
25	06/16/1962	Myers Brothers Memorial	Bowman Gray Stadium (Winston-Salem, NC)	P paved oval	short track	Rex White	Johnny Allen	
26	06/19/1962		Augusta International Raceway (Hephzibah, GA)	P dirt oval	short track	Joe Weatherly	Joe Weatherly	
27	06/22/1962		Southside Speedway (Midlothian, VA)	P paved oval	short track	Rex White	Jim Paschal	
28	06/23/1962	South Boston 400	South Boston Speedway (South Boston, VA)	P paved oval	short track	Jack Smith	Rex White	
29	07/04/1962	Firecracker 250	Daytona International Speedway (Daytona Beach, FL)	T paved oval	long/high speed	Banjo Matthews	Fireball Roberts	
30	07/07/1962		Columbia Speedway (Cayce, SC)	P dirt oval	short track	Jack Smith	Rex White	
31	07/13/1962		Asheville Speedway (Asheville, NC)	P dirt oval	short track	Rex White	Jack Smith	
32	07/14/1962		Greenville-Pickens Speedway (Easley, SC)	D dirt oval	short track	Jack Smith	Joe Weatherly	
33	07/17/1962		Augusta International Raceway (Hephzibah, GA)	D dirt oval	short track	Jack Smith	Joe Weatherly	
34	07/20/1962		Savannah Speedway (Savannah, GA)	P paved oval	short track	Wendell Scott	Joe Weatherly	
35	07/21/1962		Rambi Raceway (Myrtle Beach, SC)	D dirt oval	short track	Ned Jarrett	Ned Jarrett	
36	07/29/1962	Southeastern 500	Bristol International Speedway (Bristol, TN)	P paved oval	short track	Fireball Roberts	Jim Paschal	Report
37	08/03/1962	Confederate 200	Boyd's Speedway, (Ringgold, GA)	D dirt oval	short track	Richard Petty	Joe Weatherly	Report
38	08/05/1962	Nashville 500	Nashville Speedway (Nashville, TN)	P paved oval	short track	Johnny Allen	Jim Paschal	
39	08/08/1962	Rocket City 200	Huntsville Speedway, Huntsville, AL	P paved oval	short track	Richard Petty	Richard Petty	
40	08/12/1962	Western North Carolina 500	Asheville Weaverville Speedway (Weaverville, NC)	D dirt oval	short track	Jack Smith	Jim Paschal	
41	08/15/1962		Starkey Speedway, (Roanoke, VA)	P paved oval	short track	Jack Smith	Richard Petty	
42	08/18/1962	International 200	Bowman Gray Stadium (Winston-Salem, NC)	P paved oval	short track	Jack Smith	Richard Petty	
43	08/21/1962		Piedmont Interstate Fairgrounds (Spartanburg, SC)	D dirt oval	short track	Richard Petty	Richard Petty	
44	08/25/1962		Valdosta 75 Speedway (Valdosta, GA)	D dirt oval	short track	Richard Petty	Ned Jarrett	
45	09/03/1962	Southern 500	Darlington Raceway (Darlington, SC)	P paved oval	intermediate	Fireball Roberts	Larry Frank	Report
46	09/07/1962	Buddy Shuman Memorial	Hickory Speedway (Hickory, NC)	D dirt oval	short track	Junior Johnson	Rex White	
47	09/09/1962	Capital City 300	Atlantic Rural Fairgrounds (Richmond, VA)	D dirt oval	short track	Rex White	Joe Weatherly	
48	09/11/1962		Dog Track Speedway (Moyock, NC)	D dirt oval	short track	Ned Jarrett	Ned Jarrett	
49	09/13/1962		Augusta International Raceway (Hephzibah, GA)	P dirt oval	short track	Jack Smith	Joe Weatherly	
50	09/23/1962	Old Dominion 500	Martinsville Speedway (Ridgeway, VA)	P paved oval	short track	Fireball Roberts	Nelson Stacy	
51	09/30/1962	Wilkes 320	North Wilkesboro Speedway (North Wilkesboro, NC)	P paved oval	short track	Fred Lorenzen	Richard Petty	
52	10/14/1962	National 400	Charlotte Motor Speedway (Concord, NC)	P paved oval	intermediate	Fireball Roberts	Junior Johnson	
53	10/28/1962	Dixie 400	Atlanta International Raceway (Hampton, GA)	P paved oval	intermediate	Fireball Roberts	Rex White	

== Driver Standings ==
No	Driver	Points	Starts	Poles	Wins	Top 5s	Top 10s	Laps	Laps Led	$ Earnings	
1	Joe Weatherly	30,836	52	7	9	39	45	12,431	737	70,742	
2	Richard Petty	28,440	52	4	8	32	39	11,551	1478	60,763	
3	Ned Jarrett	25,336	52	4	6	19	35	11,296	1349	43,443	
4	Jack Smith	22,870	51	7	5	27	35	"10,781"	1099	34,748	
5	Rex White	19,424	37	9	8	18	23	7,683	1230	6,245	
6	Jim Paschal	18,128	39	0	4	17	24	8,311	819	7,348	
7	Fred Lorenzen	17,554	19	3	2	11	12	4,435	439	6,100	
8	Fireball Roberts	16,380	19	8	3	9	12	4,312	960	66,151	
9	Marvin Panch	15,138	17	0	0	5	8	3,642	172	26,746	
10	David Pearson	14,404	12	0	0	1	7	2,690	280	19,031	
11	Herman Beam	13,650	51	0	0	0	18	11,217	0	12,571	
12	Curtis Crider	13,050	52	0	0	3	18	10,051	0	12,016	
13	Buck Baker	12,838	37	0	0	6	14	6,707	18	12,786	
14	Larry Frank	12,814	19	0	1	2	8	3,566	85	32,986	
15	Bob Welborn	12,368	25	0	0	5	12	5,654	0	10,346	
16	George Green	12,132	46	0	0	1	15	9,279	0	9,221	
17	Larry Thomas	11,946	37	0	0	3	12	7,268	0	9,486	
18	Tom Cox	11,688	42	0	0	3	20	8,370	0	10,181	
19	Jimmy Pardue	11,414	30	0	1	5	16	7,274	200	12,066	
20	Junior Johnson	11,140	23	2	1	7	8	3,663	641	34,841	
21	Nelson Stacy	10,934	15	0	3	5	7	3,484	371	43,080	
22	Wendell Scott	9,906	41	1	0	4	19	8,542	0	7,133	
23	Buddy Baker	9,828	31	0	0	5	10	5,454	0	7,578	
24	G. C. Spencer	9,788	42	0	0	6	13	7,300	0	8,260	
25	Bunkie Blackburn	8,016	10	0	0	1	3	2,325	0	5,890	
26	Johnny Allen	7,602	20	1	1	5	8	4,094	288	7,230	
27	Emanuel Zervakis	6,406	11	0	0	0	2	2,151	5	4,545	
28	Bobby Johns	5,670	13	0	1	2	3	2,745	614	15,863	
29	Ralph Earnhardt	5,472	17	0	0	2	6	2,022	0	4,545	
30	Cotton Owens	4,984	16	1	0	7	8	2,000	108	5,905	
31	Banjo Matthews	4,956	5	2	0	1	2	532	145	11,375	
32	Sherman Utsman	4,896	12	0	0	1	4	3,293	0	3,580	
33	Darel Dieringer	4,548	14	0	0	1	3	3,179	17	5,000	
34	Tiny Lund	4,384	10	0	0	0	0	2,487	8	2,880	
35	Stick Elliott	4,254	21	0	0	0	2	3,028	0	3,928	
36	LeeRoy Yarbrough	4,240	12	0	0	1	1	1,478	0	3,485	
37	Tommy Irwin	3,980	20	0	0	2	9	2,982	10	3,775	
38	Ed Livingston	3,604	13	0	0	0	0	1,758	0	2,940	
39	Fred Harb	3,430	21	0	0	0	3	2,763	0	2,220	
40	Elmo Langley	2,556	6	0	0	0	0	774	0	1,795	
41	Bill Morton	2,522	5	0	0	0	2	1,359	0	1,350	
42	Speedy Thompson	2,522	3	0	0	0	1	443	0	1,400	
43	Jimmy Thompson	2,346	3	0	0	0	0	847	0	1,650	
44	Red Foote	2,274	4	0	0	0	0	939	0	1,600	
45	Ernie Gahan	2,092	3	0	0	0	1	284	0	725	
46	Billy Wade	2,008	4	0	0	0	2	1,054	0	1,350	
47	Jim Cushman	1,954	4	0	0	0	1	782	0	850	
48	Bill Wimble	1,944	2	0	0	0	0	231	0	675	
49	Troy Ruttman	1,890	1	0	0	1	1	218	0	1,750	
50	Cale Yarborough	1,884	8	0	0	0	1	727	0	2,725	Source:
