= 1962 Daytona 500 =

American auto racing event

Race details
- Race 5 of 53 in the 1962 NASCAR Grand National Series season
- 1962 Daytona 500 program cover
- Date: February 18, 1962
- Location: Daytona International Speedway; Daytona Beach, Florida, U.S.
- Course: Permanent racing facility 2.5 mi (4.023 km)
- Distance: 200 laps, 500 mi (804.672 km)
- Weather: Mild with temperatures approaching 78.1 °F (25.6 °C); wind speeds up to 13.8 miles per hour (22.2 km/h)
- Average speed: 152.529 miles per hour (245.472 km/h)
- Attendance: 58,070

Pole position
Driver	Fireball Roberts	Jim Stephens

Qualifying race winners
Duel 1 Winner	Fireball Roberts	Jim Stephens
Duel 2 Winner	Joe Weatherly	Bud Moore Engineering

Most laps led
Driver	Fireball Roberts	Jim Stephens
- Laps: 144

Winner
No. 22 Pontiac	Fireball Roberts	Jim Stephens

Television in the United States
- Network: ABC's WWOS
- Announcers: Jim McKay and Stirling Moss

The 1962 Daytona 500, was a NASCAR Grand National Series event that was held on February 18, 1962, at Daytona International Speedway in Daytona Beach, Florida.

It was won by Fireball Roberts driving a 1962 Pontiac. Roberts drove his famous number 22 to victory in three hours and 10 minutes. The race was run in its entirety without a single caution flag. Roberts dominated the event by leading 144 of the 200 laps. The win was Roberts' second victory of the season.

== Race results ==
Pos	Grid	No.	Driver	Entrant	Manufacturer	Laps	Winnings	Laps led	Time/Status
1	1	22	Fireball Roberts	Jim Stephens	1962 Pontiac	200	$24,190	144	3:10:41
2	10	43	Richard Petty	Petty Enterprises	1962 Plymouth	200	$10,250	32	+27 seconds
3	4	8	Joe Weatherly	Bud Moore Engineering	1962 Pontiac	199	$7,100	1	+1 Lap
4	3	47	Jack Smith	Jack Smith	1962 Pontiac	199	$4,025	0	+1 Lap
5	34	28	Fred Lorenzen	Holman-Moody	1962 Ford	199	$2,975	0	+1 Lap
6	2	39	David Pearson	Ray Fox	1962 Pontiac	198	$2,075	0	+2 Laps
7	8	4	Rex White	Rex White	1962 Chevrolet	197	$1,550	0	+3 Laps
8	35	94	Banjo Matthews	Banjo Matthews	1962 Pontiac	197	$1,050	0	+3 Laps
9	38	11	Ned Jarrett	B. G. Holloway	1962 Chevrolet	196	$850	0	+4 Laps
10	17	44	Bob Welborn	Julian Petty	1962 Pontiac	194	$750	0	+6 Laps
11	36	32	Bill Wimble	Dave McCredy	1961 Pontiac	193	$600	0	+7 Laps
12	16	84	Ernie Gahan	Rocky Hinton	1961 Ford	192	$500	0	+8 Laps
13	24	42	Bunkie Blackburn	Petty Enterprises	1962 Plymouth	192	$500	0	+8 Laps
14	28	2	Jim Paschal	Cliff Stewart	1961 Pontiac	186	$475	0	+14 Laps
15	42	95	Jim Cushman	Jack Russell	1961 Plymouth	186	$475	0	+14 Laps
16	12	7	Johnny Allen	B. G. Holloway	1962 Chevrolet	183	$450	0	+17 Laps
17	33	15	Speedy Thompson	Holman-Moody	1962 Ford	182	$450	0	Engine
18	45	01	Billy Wade	Luther Costales	1962 Ford	182	$425	0	+18 Laps
19	46	98	Paul Burrow	Ronald Hawk	1962 Ford	181	$425	0	+19 Laps
20	47	60	Tom Cox	Ray Herlocker	1960 Plymouth	180	$425	0	+20 Laps
21	43	9	Art Brady	Wildcat Williams	1962 Ford	176	$400	0	+24 Laps
22	29	19	Herman Beam	Herman Beam	1962 Ford	175	$400	0	+25 Laps
23	27	62	Curtis Crider	Curtis Crider	1961 Mercury	173	$400	0	+27 Laps
24	26	31	Jim McGuirk	–	1961 Ford	157	$400	0	Engine
25	44	92	Gerald Duke	Don Harrison	1962 Ford	150	$400	0	Engine
26	19	63	George Alsobrook	Ratus Walters	1961 Ford	144	$400	0	+56 Laps
27	7	0	Dan Gurney	Holman-Moody	1962 Ford	134	$400	0	Engine
28	31	87	Buck Baker	Buck Baker	1962 Chrysler	89	$400	0	Crash
29	15	86	Buddy Baker	Buck Baker	1962 Chrysler	83	$400	0	Overheating
30	30	72	Bobby Johns	Shorty Johns	1962 Pontiac	81	$400	0	Transmission
31	40	36	Larry Thomas	Wade Younts	1962 Dodge	76	$400	0	Distributor
32	25	68	Ed Livingston	Ed Livingston	1961 Ford	75	$400	0	Oil pressure
33	5	6	Cotton Owens	Cotton Owens	1962 Pontiac	73	$400	1	Clutch
34	9	27	Junior Johnson	Rex Lovette	1962 Pontiac	72	$400	22	Engine
35	13	53	Bob Burdick	Roy Burdick	1962 Pontiac	55	$400	0	Crankshaft
36	20	75	Ralph Earnhardt	Robert Smith	1961 Pontiac	54	$400	0	Engine
37	14	37	Wally Dallenbach	Don House	1961 Ford	53	$400	0	Engine
38	22	14	Charley Griffith	Joe Lee Johnson	1962 Chevrolet	53	$400	0	Rocker arm
39	41	88	Sal Tovella	Tom Hawkins	1961 Ford	41	$400	0	Head gasket
40	23	23	Red Farmer	Frank Rhoads	1961 Ford	34	$400	0	Spindle
41	18	25	Jim Bennett	Thurman Wilkes	1961 Ford	31	$400	0	Head gasket
42	32	85	Tommy Irwin	Monroe Shook	1962 Chevrolet	26	$400	0	Piston
43	6	29	Nelson Stacy	Holman-Moody	1962 Ford	25	$400	0	Engine
44	37	90	Marvin Panch	Bob Osiecki	1962 Dodge	19	$400	0	Rear end
45	48	38	G. C. Spencer	Matt DeMatthews	1961 Ford	15	$400	0	Clutch
46	11	66	Larry Frank	Ratus Walters	1962 Ford	14	$400	0	Engine
47	39	77	Elmo Langley	Ratus Walters	1961 Ford	4	$400	0	Engine
48	21	52	Cale Yarborough	Julian Buesink	1961 Ford	4	$400	0	Electrical
