= 1962 World 600 =

Auto race held at Charlotte Motor Speedway in 1962

Race details
- Race 23 of 53 in the 1962 NASCAR Grand National Series season
- 1962 World 600 program cover
- Date: May 27, 1962
- Location: Charlotte Motor Speedway, Concord, North Carolina
- Course: Permanent racing facility
- Course length: 1.5 miles (2.4 km)
- Distance: 400 laps, 600 mi (965.606 km)
- Weather: Extremely hot with temperatures of 91.9 °F (33.3 °C); wind speeds of 9.2 miles per hour (14.8 km/h)
- Average speed: 125.552 mph (202.056 km/h)

Pole position
| Driver | Fireball Roberts | |

Most laps led
| Driver | David Pearson | N/A |
- Laps: 208

Winner
| No. 29 | Nelson Stacy | |

The 1962 World 600, the 3rd running of the event, was a NASCAR Grand National Series race held on May 27, 1962 at Charlotte Motor Speedway in Charlotte, North Carolina. Contested over 400 laps on the 1.5 mile (2.4 km) speedway, it was the 23rd race of the 1962 NASCAR Grand National Series season.

== Background ==
Charlotte Motor Speedway is a motorsports complex located in Concord, North Carolina, United States, 13 miles from Charlotte, North Carolina. The complex features a 1.5 miles (2.4 km) quad oval track that hosts NASCAR racing including the prestigious World 600 on Memorial Day weekend and the National 400. The speedway was built in 1959 by Bruton Smith and is considered the home track for NASCAR with many race teams located in the Charlotte area. The track is owned and operated by Speedway Motorsports Inc. (SMI).

== Race report ==
Nelson Stacy won the race over the second-place Joe Weatherly by a time of 32.35 seconds; making his third race victory of out a total of four. The race lasted four hours, forty-six minutes, and forty-four seconds. Average speed during the race was 125.552 miles per hour (202.056 km/h) while the pole position qualifier had a speed of 140.15 miles per hour (225.55 km/h). Two cautions slowed the race for 14 laps. Eighteen lead changes were recorded during the race.

David Pearson was leading with seven laps to go. It was an extremely hot day and Pearson said it was hard to see because he had to wipe the sweat from his head on the straightaway. While leading with seven laps to go, his car just quit on him. He said it was one of the most disappointing losses of his career.

Red Foote would make his NASCAR debut in this race while Gerald Duke and Herb Tillman would retire from professional stock car racing after this event. Joe Weatherly's respectable second-place finish managed to boost him ahead of Jack Smith in the championship standings.

Notable crew chiefs for this race; included Bud Moore, Herman Beam, Glen Wood, Herb Nab and Ratus Walters.

=== Final results ===
| Fin | St | # | Driver | Sponsor | Make | Laps | Led | Status |
|---|---|---|---|---|---|---|---|---|
| 1 | 18 | 29 | Nelson Stacy | Ron's Ford Sales | '62 Ford | 400 | 13 | running |
| 2 | 4 | 8 | Joe Weatherly | Bud Moore | '62 Pontiac | 400 | 0 | running |
| 3 | 15 | 0 | Fred Lorenzen | LaFayette | '62 Ford | 399 | 0 | running |
| 4 | 21 | 43 | Richard Petty | Petty Enterprises | '62 Plymouth | 397 | 5 | running |
| 5 | 12 | 66 | Larry Frank | Cafe Burgundy | '62 Ford | 395 | 0 | running |
| 6 | 14 | 11 | Ned Jarrett | City Chevrolet Co. | '62 Chevrolet | 394 | 0 | running |
| 7 | 2 | 3 | David Pearson | Gerry Earl Pontiac | '62 Pontiac | 393 | 208 | engine |
| 8 | 11 | 21 | Marvin Panch | Wood Brothers | '62 Ford | 393 | 0 | running |
| 9 | 1 | 22 | Fireball Roberts | Stephens Pontiac | '62 Pontiac | 393 | 27 | running |
| 10 | 24 | 41 | Bunkie Blackburn | Petty Enterprises | '62 Plymouth | 393 | 0 | running |
| 11 | 10 | 4 | Rex White | Louis Clements | '62 Chevrolet | 392 | 0 | running |
| 12 | 31 | 39 | LeeRoy Yarbrough | Ray Nichels | '61 Pontiac | 386 | 0 | running |
| 13 | 19 | 44 | Bob Welborn | Julian Petty | '62 Pontiac | 385 | 0 | running |
| 14 | 8 | 20 | Emanuel Zervakis | | '62 Mercury | 383 | 0 | running |
| 15 | 6 | 46 | Johnny Allen | Holly Farms | '62 Pontiac | 380 | 4 | running |
| 16 | 22 | 36 | Larry Thomas | Wade Younts | '62 Dodge | 378 | 0 | running |
| 17 | 26 | 84 | Red Foote | Rocky Hinton | '61 Ford | 369 | 0 | running |
| 18 | 46 | 61 | Bill Morton | | '62 Ford | 368 | 0 | running |
| 19 | 37 | 30 | Tiny Lund | Fred Clark | '62 Chevrolet | 365 | 0 | running |
| 20 | 28 | 9 | Jimmy Thompson | Wildcat Williams | '62 Ford | 364 | 0 | running |
| 21 | 27 | 79 | G.C. Spencer | Ralph Smith | '62 Chevrolet | 363 | 0 | running |
| 22 | 38 | 1 | George Green | Jess Potter | '61 Chevrolet | 360 | 0 | running |
| 23 | 34 | 90 | Darel Dieringer | Bob Osiecki | '62 Dodge | 358 | 0 | coil wire |
| 24 | 25 | 47 | Jack Smith | | '62 Pontiac | 355 | 0 | brakes |
| 25 | 39 | 19 | Herman Beam | | '62 Ford | 348 | 0 | running |
| 26 | 47 | 5 | Stick Elliott | Leroy Faucett | '61 Pontiac | 341 | 0 | running |
| 27 | 42 | 62 | Curtis Crider | | '62 Mercury | 284 | 0 | wheel |
| 28 | 5 | 72 | Bobby Johns | Shorty Johns | '62 Pontiac | 284 | 24 | push rod |
| 29 | 17 | 77 | Jim Reed | Ratus Walters | '62 Ford | 284 | 0 | engine |
| 30 | 41 | 34 | Wendell Scott | | '61 Chevrolet | 277 | 0 | engine |
| 31 | 20 | 87 | Buck Baker | | '62 Chrysler | 259 | 0 | oil pressure |
| 32 | 32 | 2 | Jim Paschal | Cliff Stewart | '62 Pontiac | 227 | 0 | fuel pump |
| 33 | 33 | 91 | Herb Tillman | Bob Osiecki | '62 Dodge | 194 | 0 | clutch |
| 34 | 7 | 54 | Jimmy Pardue | | '62 Pontiac | 190 | 119 | crash |
| 35 | 16 | 86 | Buddy Baker | Buck Baker | '62 Chrysler | 176 | 0 | oil pressure |
| 36 | 29 | 68 | Ed Livingston | Livingston's Auto Parts | '61 Ford | 118 | 0 | engine |
| 37 | 23 | 92 | Gerald Duke | Don Harrison | '62 Ford | 96 | 0 | engine |
| 38 | 9 | 6 | Junior Johnson | Cotton Owens | '62 Pontiac | 72 | 0 | clutch |
| 39 | 40 | 93 | Lee Reitzel | | '62 Ford | 69 | 0 | transmission |
| 40 | 35 | 38 | John Dodd, Jr. | Matt DeMatthews | '61 Ford | 68 | 0 | engine |
| 41 | 36 | 58 | Paul Lewis | | '61 Chevrolet | 57 | 0 | engine |
| 42 | 44 | 60 | Tom Cox | Ray Herlocker | '60 Plymouth | 45 | 0 | crankshaft |
| 43 | 3 | 94 | Banjo Matthews | | '62 Pontiac | 13 | 0 | crash |
| 44 | 13 | 81 | Roscoe Thompson | | '62 Mercury | 12 | 0 | engine |
| 45 | 30 | 16 | Ralph Earnhardt | Happy Steigel | '61 Pontiac | 11 | 0 | crash |
| 46 | 48 | 80 | Tubby Gonzales | | '61 Ford | 6 | 0 | vibration |
| 47 | 43 | 96 | Johnny Sudderth | | '61 Chevrolet | 5 | 0 | engine |
| 48 | 45 | 50 | Bobby Waddell | | '60 Dodge | 2 | 0 | freeze pl |
