= 1963 NASCAR Grand National Series =

American motorsport season

1963 Grand National Series

Seasons
- ← 1962 1964 →

The 1963 NASCAR Grand National Series was an American stock car racing competition. It was the fourteenth running of what is now called the NASCAR Cup Series.

The series was won by Joe Weatherly from Richard Petty and Fred Lorenzen.

== Schedule ==
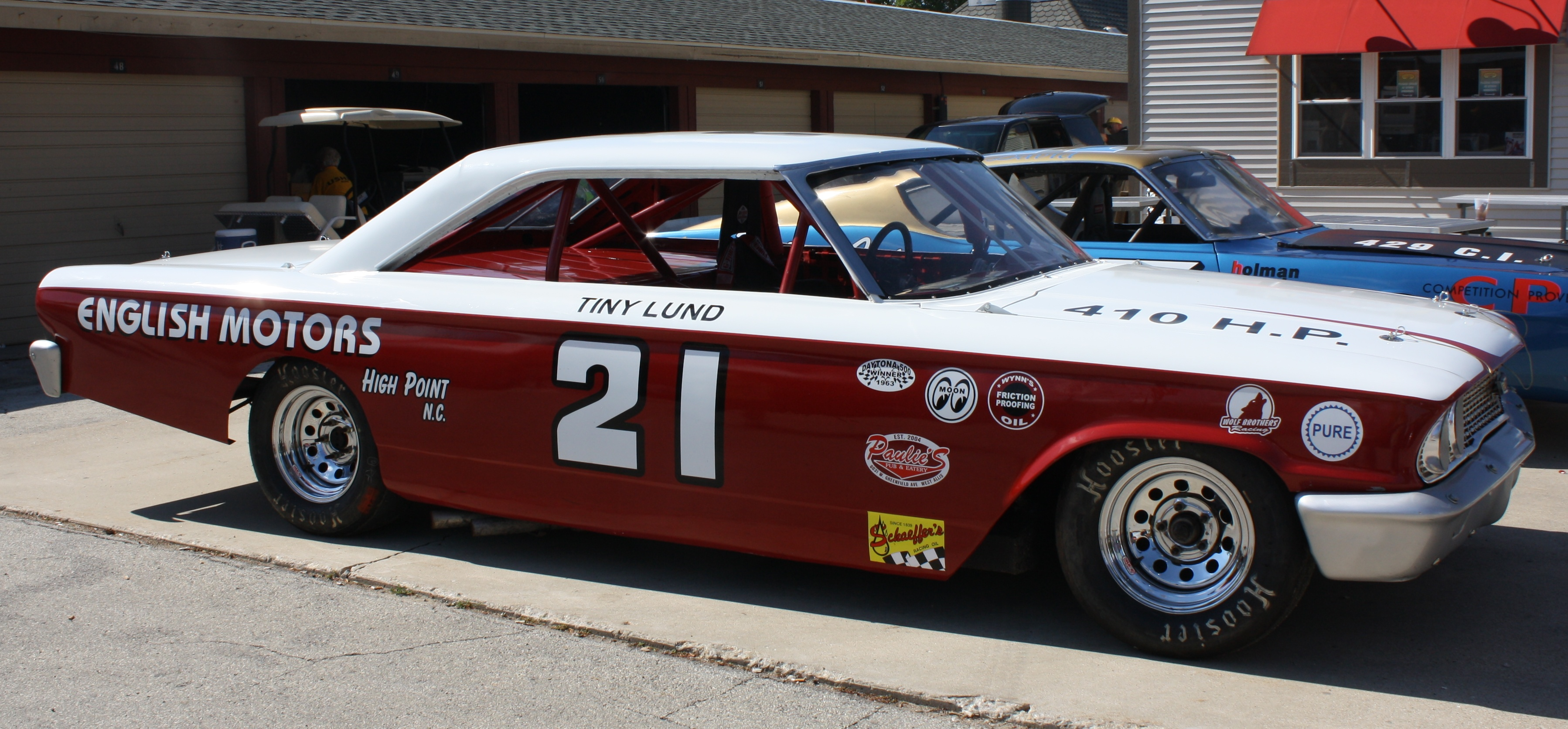
A replica of the Ford Galaxie in which Tiny Lund won the 1963 Daytona 500 for Wood Brothers Racing

No.	Race title	Track	Date
1	1963-1	Fairgrounds Raceway, Birmingham	November 4, 1962
2	Tampa 60	Golden Gate Speedway, Tampa	November 11, 1962
3	Turkey Day 200	Tar Heel Speedway, Randleman	November 22, 1962
4	Riverside 500	Riverside International Raceway, Riverside	January 20, 1963
5	100 Mile Qualifying Races	Daytona International Speedway, Daytona Beach	February 22, 1963
6	100 Mile Qualifying Races	Daytona International Speedway, Daytona Beach	February 22, 1963
7	Daytona 500	Daytona International Speedway, Daytona Beach	February 24, 1963
8	Piedmont 100	Piedmont Interstate Fairgrounds, Spartanburg	March 2, 1963
9	Weaverville 100	Asheville-Weaverville Speedway, Weaverville	March 3, 1963
10	Hillsborough 150	Orange Speedway, Hillsborough	March 10, 1963
11	Atlanta 500	Atlanta International Raceway, Hampton	March 17, 1963
12	Hickory 250	Hickory Speedway, Hickory	March 24, 1963
13	Southeastern 500	Bristol International Speedway, Bristol	March 31, 1963
14	Augusta 100	Augusta Speedway, Augusta	April 4, 1963
15	Richmond 250	Atlantic Rural Fairgrounds, Richmond	April 7, 1963
16	Greenville 200	Greenville-Pickens Speedway, Greenville	April 13, 1963
17	South Boston 400	South Boston Speedway, South Boston	April 14, 1963
18	1963-18	Bowman Gray Stadium, Winston-Salem	April 15, 1963
19	Virginia 500	Martinsville Speedway, Ridgeway	April 21, 1963
20	Gwyn Staley 400	North Wilkesboro Speedway, North Wilkesboro	April 28, 1963
21	Columbia 200	Columbia Speedway, Columbia	May 2, 1963
22	1963-22	Tar Heel Speedway, Randleman	May 5, 1963
23	Rebel 300 (twin 150's)	Darlington Raceway, Darlington	May 11, 1963
24	1963-24	Old Dominion Speedway, Manassas	May 18, 1963
25	1963-25	Southside Speedway, Richmond	May 19, 1963
26	World 600	Charlotte Motor Speedway, Concord	June 2, 1963
27	1963-27	Fairgrounds Raceway, Birmingham	June 9, 1963
28	Dixie 400	Atlanta International Raceway, Hampton	June 30, 1963
29	Firecracker 400	Daytona International Speedway, Daytona Beach	July 4, 1963
30	Speedorama 200	Rambi Raceway, Myrtle Beach	July 7, 1963
31	1963-31	Savannah Speedway, Savannah	July 10, 1963
32	1963-32	Dog Track Speedway, Moyock	July 11, 1963
33	1963-33	Bowman Gray Stadium, Winston-Salem	July 13, 1963
34	1963-34	New Asheville Speedway, Asheville	July 14, 1963
35	1963-35	Old Bridge Stadium, Old Bridge	July 19, 1963
36	1963-36	Bridgehampton Raceway, Bridgehampton	July 21, 1963
37	Volunteer 500	Bristol International Speedway, Bristol	July 28, 1963
38	Pickens 200	Greenville-Pickens Speedway, Greenville	July 30, 1963
39	Nashville 400	Nashville Speedway, Nashville	August 4, 1963
40	Sandlapper 200	Columbia Speedway, Columbia	August 8, 1963
41	Western North Carolina 500	Asheville-Weaverville Speedway, Weaverville	August 11, 1963
42	1963-42	Piedmont Interstate Fairgrounds, Spartanburg	August 14, 1963
43	International 200	Bowman Gray Stadium, Winston-Salem	August 16, 1963
44	Mountaineer 300	West Virginia International Speedway, Huntington	August 18, 1963
45	Southern 500	Darlington Raceway, Darlington	September 2, 1963
46	Buddy Shuman 250	Hickory Speedway, Hickory	September 6, 1963
47	Capital City 300	Atlantic Rural Fairgrounds, Richmond	September 8, 1963
48	Old Dominion 500	Martinsville Speedway, Ridgeway	September 22, 1963
49	1963-49	Dog Track Speedway, Moyock	September 24, 1963
50	Wilkes 400	North Wilkesboro Speedway, North Wilkesboro	September 29, 1963
51	1963-51	Tar Heel Speedway, Randleman	October 5, 1963
52	National 400	Charlotte Motor Speedway, Concord	October 13, 1963
53	South Boston 400	South Boston Speedway, South Boston	October 20, 1963
54	1963-54	Orange Speedway, Hillsborough	October 27, 1963
55	Golden State 400	Riverside International Raceway, Riverside	November 3, 1963

== Races ==
=== Riverside 500 ===
1. 28 - Dan Gurney
2. 02 - A. J. Foyt
3. 14 - Troy Ruttman
4. 22 - Fireball Roberts
5. 7 - Bobby Johns
6. 11 - Ned Jarrett
7. 5 - Billy Wade
8. 54 - Jimmy Pardue
9. 1 - Danny Letner
10. 98 - Joe Ruttman

=== Daytona 100 Mile Qualifying Races ===
The qualifying races for the Daytona 500 were held on February 22. Fireball Roberts won the pole for Race 1, and Fred Lorenzen won the pole for Race 2. Johnny Rutherford's victory in Race 2 came in his NASCAR Grand National debut. Since the qualifying races were points-paying races at the time, Rutherford's victory made him the sixth driver in NASCAR Cup history to win a points race in his first start; a feat that would not be accomplished again until 2023 by Shane van Gisbergen.

Race 1 results:

1. #3 - Junior Johnson
2. #01 - Paul Goldsmith
3. #02 - A.J. Foyt
4. #06 - Larry Frank
5. #0 - Dan Gurney
6. #22 - Fireball Roberts
7. #44 - Tommy Irwin
8. #14 - Troy Ruttman
9. #69 - Johnny Allen
10. #31 - Dick Good

Race 2 results:

1. #13 - Johnny Rutherford
2. #4 - Rex White
3. #28 - Fred Lorenzen
4. #11 - Ned Jarrett
5. #29 - Nelson Stacy
6. #21 - Tiny Lund
7. #7 - Bobby Johns
8. #15 - Parnelli Jones
9. #26 - Darel Dieringer
10. #10 - Bunkie Blackburn

=== Daytona 500 ===
The 1963 Daytona 500 was won by Tiny Lund driving a 1963 Ford. Lund drove his number 21 to victory in three hours and 17 minutes. Lund, who was driving for Wood Brothers Racing, filled in for Marvin Panch who was suffering from injuries after a fiery crash.

1. #21 - Tiny Lund
2. #28 - Fred Lorenzen
3. #11 - Ned Jarrett
4. #29 - Nelson Stacy
5. #0 - Dan Gurney
6. #43 - Richard Petty
7. #7A - Bobby Johns
8. #8 - Joe Weatherly
9. #13 - Johnny Rutherford
10. #44 - Tommy Irwin

=== Pickens 200 ===
The 1963 Pickens 200 was a NASCAR Grand National Series racing event that took place on July 30, 1963, at Greenville-Pickens Speedway (Greenville, South Carolina).

Three lead changes ended up circulating amongst three different race leaders. This racing event took place on a dirt track oval with 200 laps being the pre-determined number of laps according to the NASCAR officials who sanctioned the event. J. D. McDuffie would crash into the wall on his first lap in his 1961 Ford Galaxie vehicle; causing him to become the last-place finisher of the race.

Frank Warren would make his NASCAR debut racing against Buck Baker, Neil Castles, Joe Weatherly, Wendell Scott (NASCAR's first African-American competitor), and Cale Yarborough.

1. #41 - Richard Petty
2. #11 - Ned Jarrett
3. #87 - Buck Baker
4. #2 - Fred Harb
5. #99 - Bobby Isaac
6. #6 - David Pearson
7. #32 - Tiny Lund
8. #05 - Joe Weatherly
9. #X - Frank Warren
10. #34 - Wendell Scott

=== Sandlapper 200 ===
The 1963 Sandlapper 200 was the official site of Richard Petty's 25th NASCAR Grand National win for Petty Enterprises; leading 138 laps in that race. The race took place on August 8, 1963, at Columbia Speedway in Columbia, South Carolina. Two hundred laps were done on a dirt track spanning 0.500 miles (0.805 km).

1. #43 - Richard Petty
2. #6 - David Pearson
3. #99 - Bobby Isaac
4. #11 - Ned Jarrett
5. #03 - G. C. Spencer
6. #5 - Billy Wade
7. #48 - Jack Smith
8. #19 - Cale Yarborough
9. #34 - Wendell Scott
10. #57 - Bobby Keck

=== Old Dominion 500 ===
The 1963 Old Dominion 500 is a NASCAR Grand National Series race that took place on September 22, 1963, at Martinsville Speedway in Martinsville, Virginia, U.S.. Possum Jones and Bobby Keck were the two drivers not to qualify for this event. The race was scheduled for 500 laps; taking three hours and forty-two minutes to complete. Fred Lorenzen defeated Marvin Panch by a single lap and two seconds.

1. #28 - Fred Lorenzen
2. #21 - Marvin Panch
3. #8 - Joe Weatherly
4. #6 - David Pearson
5. #41 - Richard Petty
6. #5 - Billy Wade
7. #22 - Fireball Roberts
8. #29 - Nelson Stacy
9. #47 - Jack Smith
10. #87 - Buck Baker

=== Golden State 400 ===
The 1963 Golden State 400 is a NASCAR Grand National Series racing event held on November 3, 1963, at Riverside International Raceway in the American community of Riverside, California.

Richard Petty attempted to compete using automatic transmission but his transmission failed only five laps into the race; proving that NASCAR may always be for vehicles with a four-speed T-10 manual transmission with a clutch, although in 2022, the seventh-generation Cup Series race car abandoned the H-pattern transmission in favor of a sequential gearbox. He would go on to become a replacement driver for Junior Johnson; although Johnson received credit for the fifth-place finish.

1. #16 - Darel Dieringer
2. #21 - Dave MacDonald
3. #121 - Marvin Panch
4. #22 - Fireball Roberts
5. #26 - Junior Johnson
6. #47 - Jack Smith
7. #8 - Joe Weatherly
8. #62 - Bill Amick
9. #18 - Bob Ross
10. #97 - Ron Hornaday Sr.

=== Drivers' championship ===
(key) Bold - Pole position awarded by time. Italics - Pole position set by owner's points standings. *- Most laps led.

Pos	Driver	BIR	GGS	THS	RSD	DAY	DAY	DAY	PIF	AWS	HBO	ATL	HCY	BRI	AUG	RCH	GPS	SBO	BGS	MAR	NWS	CLB	THS	DAR	ODS	RCH	CLT	BIR	ATL	DAY	MBS	SVH	DTS	BGS	ASH	OBS	BRR	BRI	GPS	NSV	CLB	AWS	PIF	BGS	ONA	DAR	HCY	RCH	MAR	DTS	NWS	THS	CLT	SBO	HBO	RSD	Points
1	Joe Weatherly	8	3	2	24		13	8	4	4	**15**	4	19	10	11	1	24	16	10	6	23	19	2	1	9		4	15	5	18	3	14	13	7	4	**7***	13	6	8	3	11	8	**17**	9	2	7	21	**21**	3	2	6	2	5	3	**1***	7	33398
7	Darel Dieringer	5	22				9	16				25		7						3				7			8		4	4					6			8								5			22		11	4	8	7		**1**	21418
NA	Dan Gurney				**1***	5		5																																																DC	NA
