= Bob Burdick =

American racing driver (1936–2007)

Robert Burdick
- Born: October 20, 1936; Omaha, Nebraska, U.S.
- Died: October 4, 2007 (aged 70)

NASCAR Cup Series career
- 15 races run over 4 years
- Best finish: 21st (1959)
- First race: 1959 Race 14 (Trenton)
- Last race: 1962 Daytona 500 (Daytona)
- First win: 1961 Atlanta 500 (Atlanta)
Wins	Top tens	Poles
1	9	2

Bob Burdick (October 20, 1936 – October 4, 2007) was a NASCAR driver from Omaha, Nebraska. He competed in fifteen Grand National Series events in his career. His win in Atlanta in 1961 made him the only Nebraska-born driver to win a race on the NASCAR circuit.

Burdick made his debut in 1959, where he won the pole at Trenton Speedway in his first career NASCAR start. Although a fire took Burdick out of the event early, he earned his first career top-ten finish with a ninth-place effort in the next race at Nashville Speedway USA. After a crash at Atlanta Motor Speedway, Burdick ended the year with finishes of sixth, sixth and second, including a pole at Columbia Speedway. During the entire year, Burdick led 25 laps (when he finished 2nd at Darlington) and never started worse than 9th. In addition, the 21st-place finish in points was Burdick's career best.

Burdick had a scant schedule in 1960, only competing in two events, both at Daytona International Speedway. Burdick made it into the prestigious Daytona 500 field after finishing seventh in the qualifier race (the Daytona qualifiers were points races until 1971), but only managed to finish 60th in the actual 500.

Burdick was able to rebound in 1961, finishing in the top-ten (eighth) once again in the Daytona qualifier event. After another dismal finish in the 500, Burdick made up for it at Atlanta Motor Speedway. Burdick led 43 of the 334 laps and held off Rex White for Burdick's lone career victory. Following the triumph, Burdick ended the year with a 4th place at Darlington Speedway and 27th at Charlotte Motor Speedway.

Burdick once again was left to the Daytona races in 1962, as his career wound down. He finished seventh in the qualifying race, his final career top-ten, easily making the Daytona 500. Burdick then had a dismal 35th-place finish in the 500, and never again made another Cup event.

On October 4, 2007, Burdick died.
