= Canton Speedway =

Defunct motorsport venue in Canton, New York

- Location: Canton, New York
- Coordinates: 44.6037°N 75.1743°W
- Broke ground: 1852
- Opened: 1950
- Closed: 1957
- Former names: St. Lawrence Valley Speedway, Canton Fairgrounds

Oval
- Surface: Clay
- Length: .4 km (0.25 mi)
- Turns: 4

Canton Speedway was a 0.25-mile (0.40 km) dirt oval raceway located near the Canada–United States border in the Northern Region of New York State.

== Overview ==
Although the St. Lawrence County Fair had relocated decades before, property owner Dennis Woods continued to organize horse racing and other community events at the former Canton New York Fairgrounds. In early 1950, brothers-in-law Roy Mussaw and Austin Todd leased the property from Woods, and the first stock car race at the St. Lawrence Valley Speedway was held that fall. In 1953 Mussaw signed a solo lease for the property, and began operating it under the name of Canton Speedway, Inc.

As St. Lawrence Valley Speedway, the track was where journeyman NASCAR Cup Series driver Dick May drove his first race in 1950. The venue was also where 1960 and 1961 NASCAR Sportsman Division national champion Bill Wimble began his racing career in 1951 by finishing last.

Competition with the Watertown Speedway, 60 miles to the southwest of the facility, and Fort Covington International Speedway, just 50 miles to the northeast, discouraged Mussaw from renewing the lease for 1958 and the grounds returned to harness racing.

The oval was used to exercise horses until 1966, when it was replaced with a residential project.
