= George Green (racing driver) =

American racing driver (1928–2004)

- Born: September 15, 1928; Easley, South Carolina, U.S.
- Died: July 14, 2004 (aged 75); Columbia, South Carolina
- Cause of death: leukemia

NASCAR Cup Series career
- 116 races run over 8 years
- Best finish: 23rd (1957)
- First race: 1956 Race 49 (Columbia)
- Last race: 1963 Turkey Day 200 (Randleman)
Wins	Top tens	Poles
0	29	0

NASCAR Convertible Division career
- 12 races run over 1 year
- Best finish: 8th (1959)
- First race: 1959 Race 1 (Daytona)
- Last race: 1959 Race 15 (Charlotte)
Wins	Top tens	Poles
0	1	0

George Green (September 15, 1928–July 30, 2004) was an American NASCAR Grand National Series driver. He finished 55th at both the 1959 Daytona 500 and the 1960 Daytona 500, with him exiting the 1960 race with a gas tank explosion. He also finished 16th in the 1962 NASCAR Grand National Series standings, racing 46 of 53 total races.

Green was also a sergeant in the U.S. Army. He died on July 30, 2004, at the age of 76.
