= Thomas Cox (racing driver) =

American racing driver (1936–2017)

- Born: February 24, 1936; Asheboro, North Carolina, U.S.
- Died: August 16, 2017 (aged 81); High Point, North Carolina, U.S.
- Awards: 1962 NASCAR Grand National Series Rookie of the Year

NASCAR Cup Series career
- 44 races run over 2 years
- Best finish: 18
- First race: 1962-02 (Asheville–Weaverville)
- Last race: 1963 National 400 (Charlotte)
Wins	Top tens	Poles
0	20	0

Thomas Clarkston Cox (February 24, 1936 – August 16, 2017) was an American NASCAR driver. He won the 1962 NASCAR Rookie of the Year Award. Cox died in High Point, North Carolina on August 16, 2017, at the age of 81.
