= Bobby Johns (racing driver) =

American racing driver

- Johns in 1965
- Born: May 22, 1932; Miami, Florida, U.S.
- Died: March 7, 2016 (aged 83); Miami, Florida, U.S.

NASCAR Cup Series career
- 141 races run over 14 years
- Best finish: 3rd (1960)
- First race: 1956 race (Columbia)
- Last race: 1969 American 500 (Rockingham)
- First win: 1960 Atlanta (Atlanta)
- Last win: 1962 Volunteer 500 (Bristol)
Wins	Top tens	Poles
2	36	2

Robert James Johns (May 22, 1932 – March 7, 2016) was an American race car driver and pit road reporter.

Johns raced in the NASCAR series in the 1956–1969 seasons, with 141 career starts. He had two wins among his 36 top-ten finishes and finished the 1960 season third in the points. He also attempted to qualify for the Indianapolis 500 seven times and succeeded in both 1965 and 1969, where he finished seventh and tenth, respectively.

Johns was able to race in NASCAR regardless of being conscripted into the United States Army.

Johns died on March 7, 2016, in his Miami, Florida home at age 83.

== Indianapolis 500 results ==
Year	Chassis	Engine	Start	Finish
1964	Yunick	Offy	Qualifying Crash	
1965	Lotus	Ford	22nd	7th
1966	BRP	Ford	Failed to Qualify	
1967	BRP	Ford	Practice Crash	
1968	Vollstedt	Ford	Practice Crash	
1969	Shrike	Offy	32nd	10th
1971	Brabham	Offy	Failed to Qualify	
