= Herman Beam =

Racecar driver

- Born: December 11, 1929; Johnson City, Tennessee, U.S.
- Died: August 27, 1980 (aged 50); Johnson City, Tennessee, U.S.
- Cause of death: Pancreatic Cancer

NASCAR Cup Series career
- 194 races run over 7 years
- Best finish: 4th (1959)
- First race: 1957 Race 53 (Hillsboro)
- Last race: 1963 Race 32 (Moyock)
Wins	Top tens	Poles
0	57	1

NASCAR Convertible Division career
- 2 races run over 1 year
- Best finish: 70th (1959)
- First race: 1959 Rebel 300 (Darlington)
- Last race: 1959 Race 10 (Asheville-Weaverville)
Wins	Top tens	Poles
0	0	0

Herman Beam (December 11, 1929 – August 27, 1980) was a NASCAR Grand National Series driver and team owner from Johnson City, Tennessee who was active as a driver from 1957 until 1963. He is famous for holding the longest streak of races without a DNF (did not finish), with 84, from 1961 until 1963. He had 57 top-ten finishes in 194 races.

== Driving career ==
Beam graduated with honours in chemistry from the University of North Carolina. He made his Grand National debut in 1957, finishing 20th in a self-owned Chevy. In 1958, he ran 20 races, with a single top-ten finish. 1959 was his best season, where he started 30 of 44 events, had 12 top-ten finishes including his first career top-five, and finished fourth in points. He made two starts in the NASCAR Convertible Division that year. In 1961, Beam suffered an engine failure at Richmond International Raceway. It was the last DNF for 84 races, starting the streak of finishing races that he is most famous for, which ended at Atlanta Motor Speedway in 1963. Beam retired from racing that year, but continued to field cars for other drivers, including Ned Jarrett and Cale Yarborough.

Beam's nickname was "Turtle", reflecting his cautious driving style, which was to finish each race without retiring. His most famous moment was at the 1962 Richmond 250 race at the Atlantic Rural Fairgrounds at Richmond, Virginia. Due to heavy rain, qualifying was cancelled, and the drivers drew for grid positions by lot. Beam drew pole position, but pulled off the track on the pace lap to let the entire field go past. He eventually finished 12th. After the race Beam said that he did not feel comfortable starting in front of faster cars. By the middle of 1963, Beam felt that factory spending and speed increases had made it too difficult for him to continue with his "stroker" technique, and he stepped back from the cockpit.

Beam's 84-race streak took place over the span of 22 months and ten days, and was being threatened by Clint Bowyer, who if he finished the first ten races of the 2009 season could have tied the record. However, he crashed at the 2009 Southern 500 at Darlington to end his streak at 83 finished races. Bowyer's teammate Kevin Harvick fell three short when his engine failed in the 2009 Auto Club 500 ending his streak at 81 races without a DNF. After the 2014 FedEx 400, his 84-race streak was broken by Greg Biffle, who finished the race despite being 108 laps down in 38th. Biffle would DNF at the Coke Zero 400 a month later, ending the streak at 89 races.

Another outstanding mark of Beam's was running the same number throughout his career. In all 194 of his starts, Beam drove only the number 19 in NASCAR Grand National races, the former record for officially retired drivers that has since been surpassed by Jeff Gordon, with 797 consecutive starts in the #24.

== Career as an owner ==
After retiring from driving in the middle of the 1963 season, Beam remained a team owner in NASCAR. He hired Cale Yarborough to drive for him the rest of the season. In 1964, Larry Thomas and Yarborough split the ride for most of the season, with H.B. Bailey, Larry Frank, and Tiny Lund each driving one race for Beam. Yarborough left Beam's team after one race, and J.T. Putney was hired to drive the car. His team shut down after running only two races in 1966. Beam died of cancer at the Veterans' Hospital in Johnson City in 1980.
