= Bunkie Blackburn =

NASCAR driver (1936-2006)

James Ronald Blackburn
- Born: April 22, 1936; Fayetteville, North Carolina, U.S.
- Died: February 28, 2006 (aged 69)
- Awards: Inducted in the Pure Darlington Record Club (1964)

NASCAR Cup Series career
- 71 races run over 8 years
- Best finish: 26th (1962
- First race: 1960 Race Southern States Fairgrounds (Charlotte)
- Last race: 1970 Carolina 500 Rockingham
Wins	Top tens	Poles
0	14	0

James Ronald "Bunkie" Blackburn (April 22, 1936 – February 28, 2006) was a NASCAR racecar driver.

== Career ==
Blackburn's father owned and operated the Fayetteville, North Carolina, racetrack.

Blackburn later competed at the historic Nashville Speedway USA against many future legendary drivers.

In 1967, Blackburn was part of a three driver crew that set a world speed record of 174 mph in a Smokey Yunick Z-28 Camaro at the Bonneville Salt Flats in a USAC/FIA event.

== NASCAR career ==
Blackburn won the 1968 Permatex 300 from the pole.

Blackburn had fourteen top-ten and four top-five finishes in the Grand National Division. He drove in the series from the late 1950s to the early 1970s for Smokey Yunick and Petty Enterprises.

Blackburn almost won the 1961 Dixie 400 at Atlanta Motor Speedway in relief for Junior Johnson. He took Johnson's car to the lead with five laps to go after Fireball Roberts ran out of gas. However, Blackburn also ran out of gas on the final lap to hand the victory to David Pearson.

Blackburn retired after a racing injury.
