= Xfinity 500 =

Auto race held in Martinsville, United States

NASCAR Cup Series
- Venue: Martinsville Speedway
- Location: Ridgeway, Virginia, United States
- Corporate sponsor: Xfinity
- First race: 1949
- Distance: 263 miles (423 km)
- Laps: 500; Stages 1/2: 130 each Final stage: 240
- Previous names: Unnamed/Unknown (1949–1955); Old Dominion 400 (1956); Sweepstakes 500 (1957); Old Dominion 500 (1958–1982, 2001–2002); Goody's 500 (1983–1995); Hanes 500 (1996–1997); NAPA Autocare 500 (1998–2000); Subway 500 (2003–2007); Tums QuikPak 500 (2008); Tums Fast Relief 500 (2009–2012); Goody's Headache Relief Shot 500 (2013–2015); Goody's Fast Relief 500 (2016); First Data 500 (2017–2019)
- Most wins (driver): Jeff Gordon; Richard Petty; Darrell Waltrip; Jimmie Johnson (6)
- Most wins (team): Hendrick Motorsports (20)
- Most wins (manufacturer): Chevrolet (34)

Circuit information
- Surface: Asphalt; Concrete (turns)
- Length: 0.526 mi (0.847 km)
- Turns: 4

The Xfinity 500 is a NASCAR Cup Series race held at Martinsville Speedway in Ridgeway, Virginia. The race is traditionally held in the fall and has been run in every NASCAR Cup Series season, starting with the sixth event in the inaugural 1949 season, making it the oldest NASCAR race on the schedule. It is currently the ninth race of ten in The Chase. William Byron is the defending winner of the event.

== History ==
First held in 1949, the race is the oldest race in NASCAR and is the ninth race of The Chase and penultimate race of the season.

The track has gone under different lengths and surfaces. From 1949-1968, the track was a 0.5 mile dirt/paved oval, from 1970-1983, a 0.525 mile asphalt/concrete oval, and in 1969 and since 1984, a 0.526 mile asphalt/concrete oval.

Prior to lights being installed, the race started at 1:30 p.m. Eastern, generally the earliest start time among the playoff races on the schedule, in an attempt to finish the race before darkness. Following a series of incidents involving both the Fall late model race and the NASCAR Cup races in the 2010s, most notably both fall 2015 races that ended in near-darkness, the track added lights for the 2017 season. The NASCAR Cup Series fall race now finishes at night, and the Late Model race is held at night.

From 2020–2025 it was the Round of 8 elimination race under the playoff format. It's replaced Darlington and Phoenix in that spot.

Heading into the 2022 finish, Ross Chastain clinched his spot into the Championship 4 by the way of a last-ditch wall-ride that has been described as a "video game-like move" in the final lap. Chastain's move also set a new Cup Series lap record on the track at 18.845 seconds. The move has been dubbed the Hail Melon by many in the sport.

The race has been sponsored by various companies including Goody's Powder, Hanes, NAPA Auto Care, Subway, Tums, First Data, and Xfinity since 2020.

As per Martinsville tradition, the winner of this race receives a custom-built grandfather clock.

== Past winners ==
Year	Date	No.	Driver	Team	Manufacturer	Race Distance		Race Time	Average Speed (mph)	Report	Ref
Year	Date	No.	Driver	Team	Manufacturer	Laps	Miles (km)	Race Time	Average Speed (mph)	Report	Ref
1949	September 25	22	Red Byron	Raymond Parks	Oldsmobile	200	100 (160.934)	N/A	N/A	Report	
1950	October 15	92	Herb Thomas	Herb Thomas	Plymouth	200	100 (160.934)	N/A	N/A	Report	
1951	October 14	7	Frank Mundy	Ted Chester	Oldsmobile	200	100 (160.934)	N/A	N/A	Report	
1952	October 19	92	Herb Thomas	Herb Thomas	Hudson	200	100 (160.934)	2:06:10	47.556	Report	
1953	October 13	80	Jim Paschal	George Hutchens	Dodge	200	100 (160.934)	1:47:07	56.013	Report	
1954	October 17	42	Lee Petty	Petty Enterprises	Chrysler	165*	82.5 (132.770)	1:51:07	44.547	Report	
1955	October 16	30	Speedy Thompson	Carl Kiekhaefer	Chrysler	200	100 (160.934)	1:40:40	N/A	Report	
1956	October 28	502	Jack Smith	Carl Kiekhaefer	Dodge	400	200 (321.868)	3:16:17	61.136	Report	
1957	October 6	49	Bob Welborn	Bob Welborn	Chevrolet	500	250 (402.336)	3:58:00	63.025	Report	
1958	October 12	22	Fireball Roberts	Frank Strickland	Chevrolet	350*	175 (281.635)	2:43:11	64.344	Report	
1959	September 27	4	Rex White	Rex White	Chevrolet	500	250 (402.336)	4:07:56	60.5	Report	
1960	September 25	4	Rex White	Rex White	Chevrolet	500	250 (402.336)	4:08:11	60.439	Report	
1961	September 24	8	Joe Weatherly	Bud Moore Engineering	Pontiac	500	250 (402.336)	3:59:40	62.586	Report	
1962	September 23	29	Nelson Stacy	Holman-Moody	Ford	500	250 (402.336)	3:44:18	66.874	Report	
1963	September 22	28	Fred Lorenzen	Holman-Moody	Ford	500	250 (402.336)	3:42:16	67.486	Report	
1964	September 27	28	Fred Lorenzen	Holman-Moody	Ford	500	250 (402.336)	3:42:49	67.32	Report	
1965	September 26	26	Junior Johnson	Junior Johnson & Associates	Ford	500	250 (402.336)	3:43:41	67.056	Report	
1966	September 25	28	Fred Lorenzen	Holman-Moody	Ford	500	250 (402.336)	3:36:50	69.177	Report	
1967	September 24	43	Richard Petty	Petty Enterprises	Plymouth	500	250 (402.336)	3:35:30	69.605	Report	
1968	September 22	43	Richard Petty	Petty Enterprises	Plymouth	500	250 (402.336)	3:47:56	65.808	Report	
1969	September 28	43	Richard Petty	Petty Enterprises	Ford	500	250 (402.336)	3:57:37	63.127	Report	
1970	October 18	43	Richard Petty	Petty Enterprises	Plymouth	500	262.5 (422.452)	3:38:16	72.235	Report	
1971	September 26	71	Bobby Isaac	Nord Krauskopf	Dodge	500	262.5 (422.452)	3:33:59	73.681	Report	
1972	September 24	43	Richard Petty	Petty Enterprises	Plymouth	500	262.5 (422.452)	3:45:02	69.989	Report	
1973	September 30	43	Richard Petty	Petty Enterprises	Plymouth	480*	252 (405.554)	3:48:51	68.631	Report	
1974	September 29	52	Earl Ross	Junior Johnson & Associates	Chevrolet	500	262.5 (422.452)	3:58:03	66.232	Report	
1975	September 28	71	Dave Marcis	Nord Krauskopf	Dodge	500	262.5 (422.452)	3:27:47	75.819	Report	
1976	September 26	11	Cale Yarborough	Junior Johnson & Associates	Chevrolet	340*	178.5 (287.267)	2:22:15	75.37	Report	
1977	September 25	11	Cale Yarborough	Junior Johnson & Associates	Chevrolet	500	262.5 (422.452)	3:34:40	73.447	Report	
1978	September 24	11	Cale Yarborough	Junior Johnson & Associates	Oldsmobile	500	262.5 (422.452)	3:18:54	79.185	Report	
1979	September 23	28	Buddy Baker	Ranier-Lundy	Chevrolet	500	262.5 (422.452)	3:29:40	75.119	Report	
1980	September 28	2	Dale Earnhardt	Rod Osterlund Racing	Chevrolet	500	262.5 (422.452)	3:46:07	69.654	Report	
1981	September 27	11	Darrell Waltrip	Junior Johnson & Associates	Buick	500	262.5 (422.452)	3:44:57	70.089	Report	
1982	October 17	11	Darrell Waltrip	Junior Johnson & Associates	Buick	500	262.5 (422.452)	3:41:05	71.315	Report	
1983	September 25	3	Ricky Rudd	Richard Childress Racing	Chevrolet	500	262.5 (422.452)	3:27:16	76.134	Report	
1984	September 23	11	Darrell Waltrip	Junior Johnson & Associates	Chevrolet	500	263 (423.257)	3:28:55	75.532	Report	
1985	September 22	3	Dale Earnhardt	Richard Childress Racing	Chevrolet	500	263 (423.257)	3:43:13	70.694	Report	
1986	September 21	27	Rusty Wallace	Blue Max Racing	Pontiac	500	263 (423.257)	3:35:32	73.191	Report	
1987	September 27	17	Darrell Waltrip	Hendrick Motorsports	Chevrolet	500	263 (423.257)	3:26:31	76.41	Report	
1988	September 25	17	Darrell Waltrip	Hendrick Motorsports	Chevrolet	500	263 (423.257)	3:30:26	74.988	Report	
1989	September 24	17	Darrell Waltrip	Hendrick Motorsports	Chevrolet	500	263 (423.257)	3:26:15	76.571	Report	
1990	September 23	11	Geoff Bodine	Junior Johnson & Associates	Ford	500	263 (423.257)	3:26:35	76.386	Report	
1991	September 22	33	Harry Gant	Leo Jackson Racing	Oldsmobile	500	263 (423.257)	3:31:42	74.535	Report	
1992	September 28	15	Geoff Bodine	Bud Moore Engineering	Ford	500	263 (423.257)	3:29:13	75.424	Report	
1993	September 26	28	Ernie Irvan	Robert Yates Racing	Ford	500	263 (423.257)	3:32:57	74.102	Report	
1994	September 25	2	Rusty Wallace	Penske Racing	Ford	500	263 (423.257)	3:24:34	77.139	Report	
1995	September 24	3	Dale Earnhardt	Richard Childress Racing	Chevrolet	500	263 (423.257)	3:33:24	73.946	Report	
1996	September 22	24	Jeff Gordon	Hendrick Motorsports	Chevrolet	500	263 (423.257)	3:11:54	82.223	Report	
1997	September 28	99	Jeff Burton	Roush Racing	Ford	500	263 (423.257)	3:35:57	73.072	Report	
1998	September 27	10	Ricky Rudd	Rudd Performance Motorsports	Ford	500	263 (423.257)	3:35:08	73.35	Report	
1999	October 3	24	Jeff Gordon	Hendrick Motorsports	Chevrolet	500	263 (423.257)	3:38:07	72.347	Report	
2000	October 1	20	Tony Stewart	Joe Gibbs Racing	Pontiac	500	263 (423.257)	3:33:39	73.859	Report	
2001	October 15*	32	Ricky Craven	PPI Motorsports	Ford	500	263 (423.257)	3:28:19	75.75	Report	
2002	October 20	97	Kurt Busch	Roush Racing	Ford	500	263 (423.257)	3:31:23	74.651	Report	
2003	October 19	24	Jeff Gordon	Hendrick Motorsports	Chevrolet	500	263 (423.257)	3:53:14	67.658	Report	
2004	October 24	48	Jimmie Johnson	Hendrick Motorsports	Chevrolet	500	263 (423.257)	3:58:43	66.103	Report	
2005	October 23	24	Jeff Gordon	Hendrick Motorsports	Chevrolet	500	263 (423.257)	3:46:25	69.695	Report	
2006	October 22	48	Jimmie Johnson	Hendrick Motorsports	Chevrolet	500	263 (423.257)	3:44:00	70.446	Report	
2007	October 21	48	Jimmie Johnson	Hendrick Motorsports	Chevrolet	506*	266.156 (428.336)	3:59:45	66.608	Report	
2008	October 19	48	Jimmie Johnson	Hendrick Motorsports	Chevrolet	504*	265.104 (426.643)	3:29:29	75.931	Report	
2009	October 25	11	Denny Hamlin	Joe Gibbs Racing	Toyota	501*	263.526 (424.103)	3:34:44	73.633	Report	
2010	October 24	11	Denny Hamlin	Joe Gibbs Racing	Toyota	500	263 (423.257)	3:40:20	71.619	Report	
2011	October 30	14	Tony Stewart	Stewart–Haas Racing	Chevrolet	500	263 (423.257)	3:49:52	68.648	Report	
2012	October 28	48	Jimmie Johnson	Hendrick Motorsports	Chevrolet	500	263 (423.257)	3:23:09	77.677	Report	
2013	October 27	24	Jeff Gordon	Hendrick Motorsports	Chevrolet	500	263 (423.257)	3:44:21	70.337	Report	
2014	October 26	88	Dale Earnhardt Jr.	Hendrick Motorsports	Chevrolet	500	263 (423.257)	3:43:07	70.725	Report	
2015	November 1	24	Jeff Gordon	Hendrick Motorsports	Chevrolet	500	263 (423.257)	3:46:35	69.643	Report	
2016	October 30	48	Jimmie Johnson	Hendrick Motorsports	Chevrolet	500	263 (423.257)	3:20:55	78.54	Report	
2017	October 29	18	Kyle Busch	Joe Gibbs Racing	Toyota	505*	265.63 (427.49)	3:32:47	74.902	Report	
2018	October 28	22	Joey Logano	Team Penske	Ford	500	263 (423.257)	3:29:32	75.31	Report	
2019	October 27	19	Martin Truex Jr.	Joe Gibbs Racing	Toyota	500	263 (423.257)	3:29:09	75.448	Report	
2020	November 1	9	Chase Elliott	Hendrick Motorsports	Chevrolet	500	263 (423.257)	3:40:27	71.581	Report	
2021	October 31	48	Alex Bowman	Hendrick Motorsports	Chevrolet	501*	263.526 (424.103)	3:42:48	70.968	Report	
2022	October 30	20	Christopher Bell	Joe Gibbs Racing	Toyota	500	263 (423.257)	3:24:18	77.239	Report	
2023	October 29	12	Ryan Blaney	Team Penske	Ford	500	263 (423.257)	3:29:43	75.244	Report	
2024	November 3	12	Ryan Blaney	Team Penske	Ford	500	263 (423.257)	3:28:31	75.677	Report	
2025	October 26	24	William Byron	Hendrick Motorsports	Chevrolet	500	263 (423.257)	3:33:59	73.744	Report	
2026	November 1	24	William Byron	Hendrick Motorsports	Chevrolet	500	263 (423.257)	3:19:06	79.257	Report	
2027	November 7	24								Report	

- 1954 & 1958: Race shortened due to darkness.
- 1967–1970: Richard Petty went on to win 4 consecutive Martinsville Fall Races in this time frame. He would become the first of only 2 drivers in the track's history, and the only driver in the history of the Fall Race, to win the same Martinsville event 4 years in a row. Rusty Wallace would accomplish this feat in the spring race from 1993–1996.
- 1973 & 1976: Race shortened due to rain.
- 2001: Race postponed from Sunday to Monday due to rain.
- 2007–2009, 2017, and 2021: Race extended due to NASCAR overtime.

=== Track length notes ===
- 1949–1968: 0.5-mile course
- 1969, 1984–present: 0.526-mile course
- 1970–1983: 0.525-mile course

=== Multiple winners (drivers) ===
# Wins	Driver	Years won
6	Richard Petty	1967–1970, 1972–1973
6	Darrell Waltrip	1981–1982, 1984, 1987–1989
6	Jeff Gordon	1996, 1999, 2003, 2005, 2013, 2015
6	Jimmie Johnson	2004, 2006–2008, 2012, 2016
3	Fred Lorenzen	1963–1964, 1966
3	Cale Yarborough	1976–1978
3	Dale Earnhardt	1980, 1985, 1995
2	Herb Thomas	1950, 1952
2	Rex White	1959–1960
2	Geoff Bodine	1990, 1992
2	Rusty Wallace	1986, 1994
2	Ricky Rudd	1983, 1998
2	Denny Hamlin	2009–2010
2	Tony Stewart	2000, 2011
2	Ryan Blaney	2023–2024
2	William Byron	2025–2026

=== Multiple winners (teams) ===
# Wins	Team	Years won
20	Hendrick Motorsports	1987–1989, 1996, 1999, 2003–2008, 2012–2016, 2020–2021, 2025–2026
9	Junior Johnson & Associates	1965, 1974, 1976–1978, 1981–1982, 1984, 1990
7	Petty Enterprises	1954, 1967–1970, 1972–1973
6	Joe Gibbs Racing	2000, 2009–2010, 2017, 2019, 2022
4	Holman-Moody	1962–1964, 1966
4	Team Penske	1994, 2018, 2023, 2024
3	Richard Childress Racing	1983, 1985, 1995
2	Herb Thomas	1950, 1952
2	Carl Kiekhaefer	1955–1956
2	Rex White	1959–1960
2	Bud Moore Engineering	1961, 1992
2	Nord Krauskopf	1971, 1975
2	Roush Racing	1997, 2002

=== Multiple winners (manufacturers) ===
# Wins	Manufacturer	Years won
34	Chevrolet	1957–1960, 1974, 1976–1977, 1979–1980, 1983–1985, 1987–1989, 1995–1996, 1999, 2003–2008, 2011–2016, 2020–2021, 2025–2026
17	Ford	1962–1966, 1969, 1990, 1992–1994, 1997–1998, 2001–2002, 2018, 2023, 2024
6	Plymouth	1950, 1967–1968, 1970, 1972–1973
5	Toyota	2009–2010, 2017, 2019, 2022
4	Oldsmobile	1949, 1951, 1978, 1991
4	Dodge	1953, 1956, 1971, 1975
3	Pontiac	1961, 1986, 2000
2	Chrysler	1954–1955
2	Buick	1981–1982

Previous race: YellaWood 500	NASCAR Cup Series; Xfinity 500	Next race: Season Finale 400
