= Confederate 200 =

1962 NASCAR race

The Confederate 200 was a NASCAR race held at Boyd's Speedway in Ringgold, Georgia on August 3, 1962 with Joe Weatherly taking the flag after leading 19 of 200 laps
