= Savannah Speedway =

Former speedway in Savannah, Georgia

The Savannah Speedway was a half-mile long oval track speedway in Savannah, Georgia. It made its debut in 1962. The track hosted 10 NASCAR Grand National Cup Series events throughout its history, 3 of which Richard Petty won.

== History ==
The racetrack opened in late 1960 as a 1/4-mile dirt oval, then in 1961 it was paved and made into more of a D-shape. In 1962 the track was expanded to a 1/2-mile track. The track was re-paved and ran un-successfully for years. In 1981 the pavement was removed and dirt racing resumed, but it then closed in June of that year, never to run again.

== Statistics ==
Cup Series Races at Savannah Speedway
Date	Race	Winner	Start	Laps Led	Car #	Sponsor	Make	Car Owner
12-29-1964	Sunshine 200	Richard Petty	5	133	43	Petty Enterprises	Plymouth	Petty Enterprises
03-17-1962	St. Patrick's Day 200	Jack Smith	4	48	47	Jack Smith	Pontiac	Jack Smith
03-15-1970	Savannah 200	Richard Petty	1	183	43	Petty Enterprises	Plymouth	Petty Enterprises
05-01-1964	Savannah 200	LeeRoy Yarbrough	4	63	45	Louis Weathersbee	Plymouth	Louis Weathersbee
10-17-1969	1969-49	Bobby Isaac	1	197	71	K & K Insurance	Dodge	Nord Krauskopf
08-25-1967	1967-39	Richard Petty	1	200	43	Petty Enterprises	Plymouth	Petty Enterprises
04-28-1967	1967-15	Bobby Allison	5	115	2	J.D. Bracken	Chevrolet	J.D. Bracken
10-09-1964	1964-57	Ned Jarrett	1	200	11	Bondy Long	Ford	Bondy Long
07-10-1963	1963-31	Ned Jarrett	2	194	11	Burton-Robinson	Ford	Charles Robinson
07-20-1962	1962-34	Joe Weatherly	6	0	8	Bud Moore	Pontiac	Bud Moore

Pole Winners
Pole winner	Poles
Richard Petty	3
Ned Jarrett	2
Jimmy Pardue	1
Rex White	1
Wendell Scott	1
John Sears	1
Bobby Isaac	1

Race Winners
Winner	Wins
Richard Petty	3
Ned Jarrett	2
Joe Weatherly	1
Jack Smith	1
Bobby Isaac	1
Bobby Allison	1

Winning Manufactures
Manufacturer	Wins
Plymouth	4
Pontiac	2
Ford	2
Chevrolet	1
Dodge	1
