= Jimmy Pardue =

James Pardue
- Born: October 26, 1930; North Wilkesboro, North Carolina, U.S.
- Died: September 22, 1964 (aged 33); Concord, North Carolina, U.S.
- Cause of death: Race car crash

NASCAR Cup Series career
- 218 races run over 8 years
- Best finish: 5th (1964
- First race: 1955 Race 42 (Martinsville)
- Last race: 1964 Race 55 (Hillsboro)
- First win: 1962 Race 18 (Southside)
- Last win: 1963 Race 32 (Dog Track)
Wins	Top tens	Poles
2	88	3

James Mansfield Pardue (October 26, 1930 – September 22, 1964) was a NASCAR race car driver who lived in North Wilkesboro, North Carolina.

== Summary ==
Pardue made his debut in 1955 at Martinsville, where he finished 28th after suffering hub problems in his Chevrolet Bel Air vehicle. He made his first full-time attempt in 1960 where he had eleven top-tens. In 1962, he won his first race at Richmond VA's Southside Speedway, followed up by another win the following year at Dog Track Speedway in Moyock, NC.

Pardue's car number was 54. A part of his career was during the same time that the popular television show, Car 54, Where Are You? was running on network television. On the door of his car, he added a small "Car" above the number, and "Here I Am" below it.

In 1964, Pardue was doing a tire test for Goodyear at Charlotte Motor Speedway, when a tire blew and caused him to lose control. The car went through the guardrail in Turns 3 and 4 and came to rest outside the track. The 33-year-old Pardue did not survive the wreck. Despite his season being cut short, he still finished fifth in points.

Items from Pardue's career, including a door from his car and Burton & Robinson Racing Team apparel, are on display at the Wilkes Heritage Museum in Wilkesboro.
