= Nelson Stacy =

American racing driver (1921–1986)

- Born: December 28, 1921; Flemingsburg, Kentucky, U.S.
- Died: May 14, 1986 (aged 64); Daytona Beach, Florida, U.S.
- Achievements: 1958 ARCA Series Champion; 1959 ARCA Series Champion; 1960 ARCA Series Champion; 1961 Southern 500 Winner; 1962 World 600 Winner; 1964 Daytona ARCA 250 Winner

NASCAR Cup Series career
- 45 races run over 6 years
- Best finish: 14th (1963)
- First race: 1952 Race #28 (Dayton)
- Last race: 1965 Firecracker 400 (Daytona)
- First win: 1961 Southern 500 (Darlington)
- Last win: 1962 Old Dominion 500 (Martinsville)
Wins	Top tens	Poles
4	24	0

ARCA Series
- Years active: 1956–1960, 1964
- Teams: Willie Holt
- Starts: 111
- Wins: 37
- Best finish: 1st in 1958, 1959, 1960

Previous series
- 1952, '61-'65: NASCAR Grand National Series

Championship titles
- 1958 1959 1960: ARCA Series Champion; ARCA Series Champion; ARCA Series Champion
- Statistics up to date as of April 28, 2013.

Nelson Stacy (December 28, 1921 – May 14, 1986) was an American race car driver from Maysville, Kentucky. He won the 1958, 1959, and 1960 MARC Series (now ARCA Menards Series) championships. He also won four NASCAR Grand National Series races in 1961 and 1962, including the 1961 Southern 500 at Darlington Speedway and the 1962 World 600 at Charlotte Motor Speedway.

== Early life ==
Stacy was originally from Kentucky. He was a veteran of World War II, serving as a tank driver in the U.S. Third Army under the command of General George S. Patton.

== Early career ==
In 1952, Stacy made his first NASCAR Grand National Series start at Dayton Speedway. After a 12th-place finish out of 30 cars, he decided it would be best to drive in the MARC Series (later the ARCA Menards Series). He lost the 1957 title to Iggy Katona by 4.5 points, one of the slimmest margins in series history. Stacy's move enabled him to win the series championship in 1958, 1959 and 1960. He had wins in 1957, 1959 and 1960 at Canfield Speedway. In 1959, he started the season in April by winning two of three races (Dayton and Canfield).

== NASCAR career ==
After a decade in the MARC series, Stacy decided to give Grand National racing another try. In 1961, he returned to NASCAR competition at age 40, competing in 15 of the 52 scheduled races. He won the 1961 Southern 500 at Darlington Raceway beating Fireball Roberts and leading 72 laps. He also accumulated eight top-ten finishes and four top-five finishes.

In 1962, Stacy won the Rebel 300 at Darlington Raceway, the final convertible race in NASCAR history, beating Marvin Panch, as well as winning the World 600 at Charlotte Motor Speedway, coming from 18th place to beat Joe Weatherly, and the 1962 Old Dominion 500 at Martinsville Speedway, beating out Richard Petty by over three laps. He accumulated three wins, seven top-tens, and five top-five finishes for the 1962 season. As mentioned, he also won the NASCAR Convertible Division race that year at the Darlington Rebel 300.

Stacy failed to win any races in 1963. He accumulated nine top-ten and four top-five finishes. He finished a career-high 14th in the final points standing that year. In 1964, at age 43, Stacy's health began to become a factor. He went on to compete in two more Grand National races. He achieved a 24th-place finish in his final start at the Firecracker 400 in 1965. Stacy ended his NASCAR career after competing in 45 races. In his career, he had 24 top-ten and 13 top-five Finishes along with four wins.

== Later life and death ==
Stacy spent his final years in Florida, where he owned a car dealership. He died on May 14, 1986, at the age of 64.

== Family life ==
Stacy was married to Mary Stacy. The couple had three children, two girls and a boy.

Sporting positions
Preceded by Iggy Katona	MARC Champion; 1958–1960	Succeeded by Harold Smith
