= Curtis Crider =

Racecar driver from South Carolina

- Born: October 7, 1930; Danville, Virginia, United States
- Died: December 21, 2012 (aged 82); Edgewater, Florida, United States
- Achievements: 1972, 1973, 1974 Florida State Stock Car Champion

NASCAR Cup Series career
- 232 races run over 7 years
- Best finish: 6th (1964)
- First race: 1959 Columbia 200, Columbia
- Last race: 1965 Virginia 500, Martinsville
Wins	Top tens	Poles
0	70	0
- Statistics up to date as of December 23, 2012.

Curtis "Crawfish" Crider (October 7, 1930 – December 21, 2012) was an American stock car racing driver, and a pioneer in the early years of NASCAR.

== Career ==
Born in Danville, Virginia, Crider was one of the hardest working and underfinanced racers to ever drive the stock car circuit. Landing in a lake eventually earned him the nickname "Crawfish". Like most early NASCAR racers, Crider was a bootlegger and delivered moonshine to his customers. From 1959 to 1965, Crider has competed in 232 races in his seven-year career and accumulated a grand total of $58740 ($600,115.63 when adjusted for inflation). Crider's average start was in 19th place while his average finish was in 15th place.

Following his retirement from NASCAR competition, Crider competed in late model stock car racing in Florida, competing primarily at Volusia County Speedway and winning the Florida State Championship in 1972, 1973 and 1974. He released a book in 1987, called "The Road to Daytona". He operated an automobile restoration shop near his home in Ormond Beach, Florida before he died on December 21, 2012.
