= Dog Track Speedway =

Racetrack

- Location: NC 168, Moyock, North Carolina
- Coordinates: 36.5454°N 76.1925°W
- Major events: Tidewater 300 - NASCAR Grand National (1962–1966)

1/4 mile oval (–1963)
- Surface: dirt
- Length: 0.25 mi (0.4 km)

1/3 mile oval (1964–)
- Surface: paved
- Length: 0.333 mi (0.536 km)
- Race lap record: 63.965 mph (Richard Petty, Petty Enterprises, August 13, 1964, NASCAR)

Dog Track Speedway was a 1/4-mile dirt then 1/3-mile paved oval in Moyock, North Carolina. It hosted seven NASCAR Grand National (now NASCAR Cup Series) races between 1962 and 1966. The track switched from a quarter mile to third mile between 1963 and 1964.

== History ==
After the Cavalier Kennel Club (CKC) greyhound racing track was eliminated by the North Carolina General Assembly in the 1950s, Moyock began to host auto racing at the renamed Dog Track Speedway (DTS). Built on the former site of the CKC, the one-quarter-mile oval dirt track was then paved and lengthened to one-third of a mile in 1964. The track was accessible from North Carolina Highway 168. At the DTS, it hosted seven NASCAR races from 1962 until 1966. The Moyock 300 was held there from 1964–1965 in addition to the Tidewater 300 in 1965.

Ned Jarrett won the most races at the track with four wins (1962, 1963, 1964, and one of the two 1965 races). The three other winners were Jimmy Pardue (first 1963 race), Dick Hutcherson (first 1965 race), and David Pearson (1966). In the 1964 race, the race was stopped due to rain with Pearson in the lead and the feature resumed to conclusion on the following night. The 1965 race was NASCAR's season finale. Ned Jarrett won his 13th race of the season to secure the season championship. It was his second and final Grand National championship.

Richard Petty, a North Carolina native from Randleman, also raced there six times, driving a Plymouth in every race. Despite being on the pole twice (1965 & 1966), Petty never finished above 3rd place. He does hold the track NASCAR record speed of 63.965 miles per hour.

The final NASCAR race at the DTS ran on Sunday, May 29, 1966. It was 301 laps (99.9 miles) as NASCAR scoring missed the length by one lap. David Pearson took the checkered flag in a 1964 Dodge with an average speed of 61.913 miles per hour (99.639 km/h) and winning $1,000. Wendell Scott was the only driver to start all seven NASCAR races. The track was closed later in 1966 due to declining attendance, poor revenues and larger tracks being built nearby. The site where Dog Track Speedway formally stood is now located on a housing development in the Tidewater Region, with the land formerly being an abandoned lot.
