= Larry Frank =

American racing driver (1929–2010)

- Born: April 29, 1929; Glen Dale, West Virginia, U.S.
- Died: January 5, 2010 (aged 80); Greenville, South Carolina, U.S.
- Cause of death: Lymphoma
- Achievements: 1962 Southern 500 winner

NASCAR Cup Series career
- 103 races run over 11 years
- Best finish: 14th (1962)
- First race: 1956 Old Dominion 400 (Martinsville)
- Last race: 1966 Daytona 500 (Daytona)
- First win: 1962 Southern 500 (Darlington)
Wins	Top tens	Poles
1	32	0

Larry Frank (April 29, 1929 – January 5, 2010) was an American NASCAR Grand National Series driver. He is best known for winning the 1962 Southern 500.

Larry Frank won the Southern 500 in Darlington in 1962 driving a 1962 Ford owned and built by Ratus Walters. Junior Johnson received the checkered flag but Car owner, pit chief Ratus Walters challenged the finish. Officials found the scorers had missed one of Franks laps and, therefore, declared him the winner - 3 hours after the finish of the race.

== Career ==
Born in West Virginia, Frank was known as a resident of Indianapolis, Indiana. He began racing motorcycles and subsequently moved up to sprint cars and midget cars. Frank made 38 starts in the 47-event 1956 NASCAR Convertible Series. On October 28, 1956, Frank made his debut in the NASCAR Grand National Division in the Old Dominion 400 at Martinsville, Virginia driving Lonnie Fish's No. 76 Chevrolet finishing 38th after losing oil pressure on lap 77. In 1957, Frank spent most of his time competing in the Convertible Series racing in all but one race. Frank also made four starts in the NASCAR Grand National Division during the 1957 season driving Fish's No. 76 Chevrolet. His best finish of the season was 13th at Langhorne Speedway. In the 1958 NASCAR Grand National Division, Frank competed in 11 events. He finished third in the Nashville 200, recording one top-five and four top-tens. Over the next few years, Frank had average runs in both the Grand National and the Convertible series. The high point of Frank's career occurred in 1962 when he qualified tenth for the Southern 500. He led 85 laps and lapped the entire field finishing the race with two blown tires. After a scoring issue, Junior Johnson was declared the winner. Frank filed a protest and after a review he was declared the winner of the Southern 500. The car number for this win was No. 66; as of 2019, Frank is the only driver to win a Cup race using this number. In 1966, Frank decided it was time to call it quits. He subsequently opened Larry Frank's Auto Body Shop in Greenville, South Carolina, operating it with his wife Margaret.

== Off-track life and death ==
Frank had served in the United States Marine Corps, and was also a Golden Gloves boxer. In 2009, Frank was diagnosed with lymphoma. He died on January 5, 2010, at his home in Greenville, South Carolina.
