= 2016 Folds of Honor QuikTrip 500 =

Race details
- Race 2 of 36 in the 2016 NASCAR Sprint Cup Series
- Date: February 28, 2016
- Location: Atlanta Motor Speedway in Hampton, Georgia
- Course: Permanent racing facility
- Course length: 1.54 miles (2.478 km)
- Distance: 330 laps, 508.2 mi (817.869 km)
- Scheduled distance: 325 laps, 500.5 mi (805.477 km)
- Weather: Sunny, clear blue skies with a temperature of 64 °F (18 °C); wind out of the southwest at 8 mph (13 km/h).
- Average speed: 155.863 mph (250.837 km/h)

Pole position
Driver	Kurt Busch	Stewart–Haas Racing
- Time: 28.938

Most laps led
Driver	Kevin Harvick	Stewart–Haas Racing
- Laps: 131

Winner
No. 48	Jimmie Johnson	Hendrick Motorsports

Television in the United States
- Network: Fox
- Announcers: Mike Joy, Jeff Gordon and Darrell Waltrip
- Nielsen ratings: 3.7/8 (Overnight); 4.1/9 (Final); 6.8 million viewers

Radio in the United States
- Radio: PRN
- Booth announcers: Doug Rice, Mark Garrow and Wendy Venturini
- Turn announcers: Rob Albright (1 & 2) and Pat Patterson (3 & 4)

The 2016 Folds of Honor QuikTrip 500 was a NASCAR Sprint Cup Series race held on February 28, 2016, at the Atlanta Motor Speedway in Hampton, Georgia. The series was named after co-sponsors, QuikTrip and the nonprofit, Folds of Honor, and it helped raise funds to provide educational assistance to families of U.S. service members killed or disabled in the line of duty. Contested over 330 laps—extended from 325 laps due to an overtime finish, on the 1.54-mile-long (2.48-kilometre) asphalt quad-oval intermediate speedway, it was the second race of the 2016 NASCAR Sprint Cup Series season. Jimmie Johnson won the race, the 76th of his career. This drew him level with Dale Earnhardt for seventh on the all-time wins list and third in NASCAR's post-1972 "modern era." Teammate Dale Earnhardt Jr. finished second, and Kyle Busch, Kurt Busch and Carl Edwards rounded out the top-five.

Kurt Busch won the pole for the race and led 62 laps on his way to a fourth-place finish. Kevin Harvick led a race high of 131 laps on his way to a sixth-place finish. There were 28 lead changes among eight different drivers, as well as three caution flag periods for 13 laps.

This was the 76th career victory for Johnson, first of the season, fifth at Atlanta Motor Speedway and 14th at the track for Hendrick Motorsports. It moved Johnson up to sixth in the points standings. Despite being the winning manufacturer, Chevrolet left Atlanta trailing by three-points to Toyota in the manufacturer standings.

The Folds of Honor QuikTrip 500 was carried by Fox Sports on the broadcast Fox network for the American television audience. The radio broadcast for the race was carried by the Performance Racing Network and Sirius XM NASCAR Radio.

== Report ==
=== Background ===
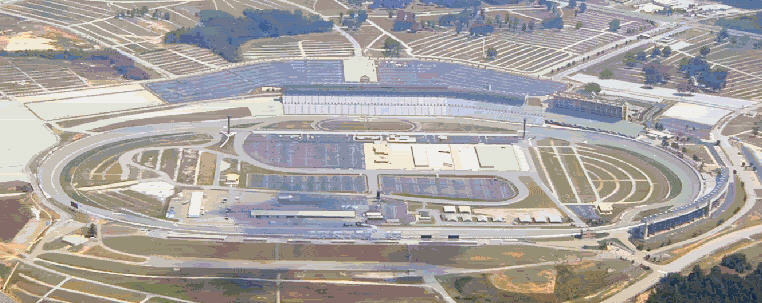
Atlanta Motor Speedway, the track where the race was held.

Atlanta Motor Speedway is a 1.54-mile (2.48-kilometre) quad-oval track in Hampton, Georgia. Denny Hamlin entered as the points leader with a five-point lead over Martin Truex Jr. Kyle Busch entered third, six points back. Kevin Harvick entered fourth, eight points back and Carl Edwards entered fifth, nine points back.

== Entry list ==
The entry list for the Folds of Honor QuikTrip 500 was released on Tuesday, February 23 at 4:34 p.m. Eastern time. Thirty-nine cars were entered for the race, the smallest field for a Sprint Cup Series race since the 1996 Tyson Holly Farms 400, the last Cup Series race held at North Wilkesboro Speedway. It was also the fewest cars entered for a Cup Series race since 1993. The three driver changes for this weekend's race were Ty Dillon taking over the No. 14 Stewart–Haas Racing Chevrolet, Jeffrey Earnhardt driving the No. 32 Go FAS Racing Ford and Michael McDowell returning to the seat of the No. 95 Circle Sport – Leavine Family Racing Chevrolet.

No.	Driver	Team	Manufacturer
1	Jamie McMurray	Chip Ganassi Racing	Chevrolet
2	Brad Keselowski	Team Penske	Ford
3	Austin Dillon	Richard Childress Racing	Chevrolet
4	Kevin Harvick	Stewart–Haas Racing	Chevrolet
5	Kasey Kahne	Hendrick Motorsports	Chevrolet
6	Trevor Bayne	Roush Fenway Racing	Ford
7	Regan Smith	Tommy Baldwin Racing	Chevrolet
10	Danica Patrick	Stewart–Haas Racing	Chevrolet
11	Denny Hamlin	Joe Gibbs Racing	Toyota
13	Casey Mears	Germain Racing	Chevrolet
14	Ty Dillon (i)	Stewart–Haas Racing	Chevrolet
15	Clint Bowyer	HScott Motorsports	Chevrolet
16	Greg Biffle	Roush Fenway Racing	Ford
17	Ricky Stenhouse Jr.	Roush Fenway Racing	Ford
18	Kyle Busch	Joe Gibbs Racing	Toyota
19	Carl Edwards	Joe Gibbs Racing	Toyota
20	Matt Kenseth	Joe Gibbs Racing	Toyota
21	Ryan Blaney (R)	Wood Brothers Racing	Ford
22	Joey Logano	Team Penske	Ford
23	David Ragan	BK Racing	Toyota
24	Chase Elliott (R)	Hendrick Motorsports	Chevrolet
27	Paul Menard	Richard Childress Racing	Chevrolet
30	Josh Wise	The Motorsports Group	Chevrolet
31	Ryan Newman	Richard Childress Racing	Chevrolet
32	Jeffrey Earnhardt (R)	Go FAS Racing	Ford
34	Chris Buescher (R)	Front Row Motorsports	Ford
38	Landon Cassill	Front Row Motorsports	Ford
41	Kurt Busch	Stewart–Haas Racing	Chevrolet
42	Kyle Larson	Chip Ganassi Racing	Chevrolet
43	Aric Almirola	Richard Petty Motorsports	Ford
44	Brian Scott (R)	Richard Petty Motorsports	Ford
46	Michael Annett	HScott Motorsports	Chevrolet
47	A. J. Allmendinger	JTG Daugherty Racing	Chevrolet
48	Jimmie Johnson	Hendrick Motorsports	Chevrolet
78	Martin Truex Jr.	Furniture Row Racing	Toyota
83	Matt DiBenedetto	BK Racing	Toyota
88	Dale Earnhardt Jr.	Hendrick Motorsports	Chevrolet
95	Michael McDowell	Circle Sport – Leavine Family Racing	Chevrolet
98	Cole Whitt	Premium Motorsports	Chevrolet
Official entry list

== Practice ==
=== First practice ===
Kyle Larson was the fastest in the first practice session with a time of 28.740 and a speed of 192.902 mph (310.446 km/h).

Pos	No.	Driver	Team	Manufacturer	Time	Speed
1	42	Kyle Larson	Chip Ganassi Racing	Chevrolet	28.740	192.902
2	5	Kasey Kahne	Hendrick Motorsports	Chevrolet	28.904	191.807
3	47	A. J. Allmendinger	JTG Daugherty Racing	Chevrolet	29.030	190.975
Official first practice results

=== Final practice ===
Denny Hamlin was the fastest in the final practice session with a time of 29.419 and a speed of 188.450 mph (303.281 km/h).

Pos	No.	Driver	Team	Manufacturer	Time	Speed
1	11	Denny Hamlin	Joe Gibbs Racing	Toyota	29.419	188.450
2	78	Martin Truex Jr.	Furniture Row Racing	Toyota	29.454	188.226
3	48	Jimmie Johnson	Hendrick Motorsports	Chevrolet	29.600	187.297
Official final practice results

== Qualifying ==
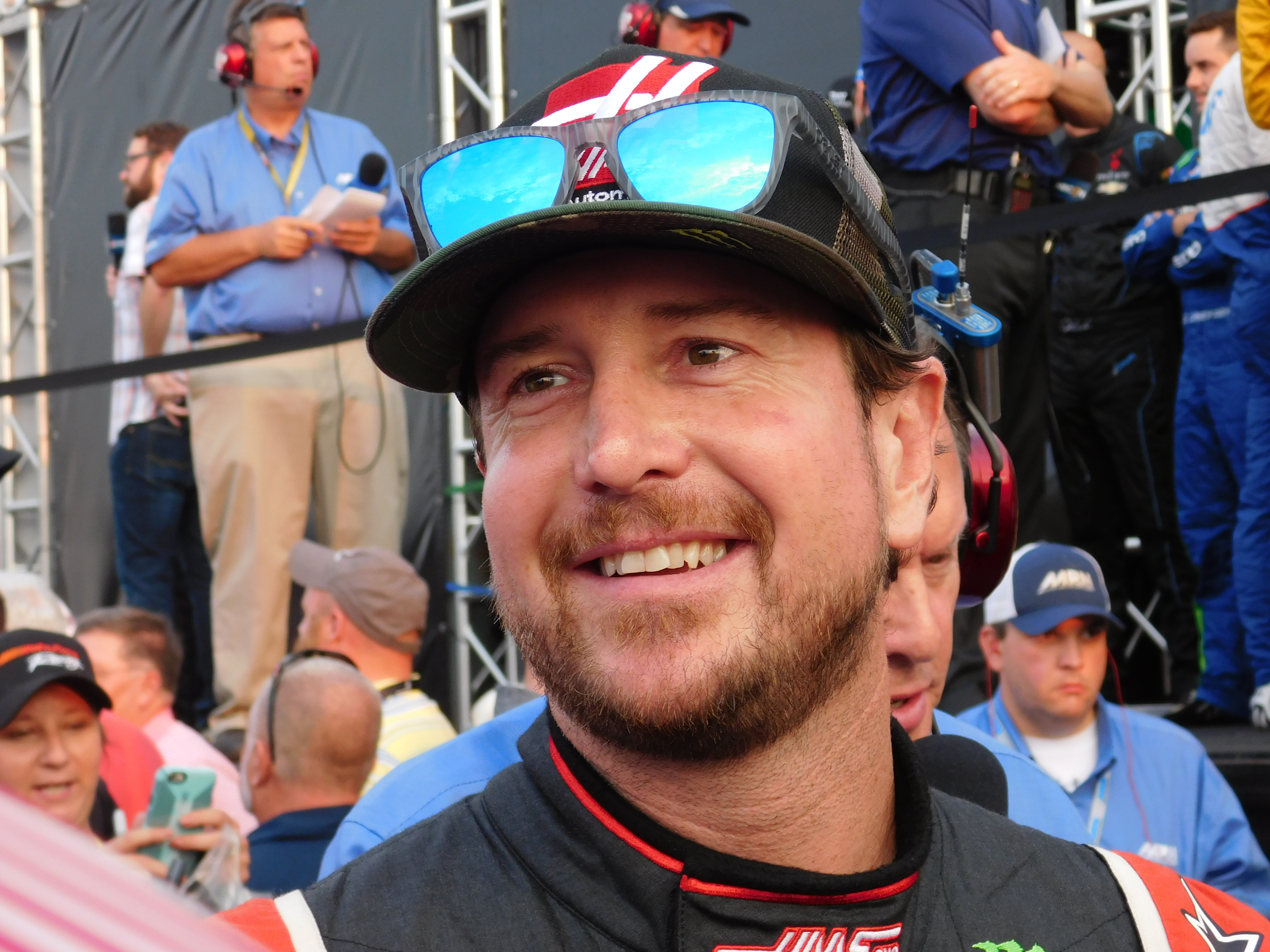
Kurt Busch scored the pole for the race.

Kurt Busch won the pole for the race with a time of 28.938 and a speed of 191.582 mph (308.321 km/h) after brother Kyle Busch had his time disallowed for a post-tech violation. The rear toe of the car – the degree to which the vertical angle of the rear wheels are skewed – was over the .15 degree maximum allowed after pre-inspection. NASCAR Senior Vice-president of Competition and Racing Development Scott Miller said that teams had "asked for it," NASCAR "instituted it" and the No. 18 car "didn't pass. The others [that went through tech] passed."

After scoring his 20th career pole, Kurt said that it was "an awesome run that the car had in it. The team did a good job to dial it in for the three rounds. I was just trying to make sure I didn’t slip a tire any extra. It’s really easy to overdrive Atlanta Motor Speedway. The track challenges the driver, the car and the tires. It’s a fun place to come and try to lay down a lap. Overall, with the way the developments came up from tech inspection this shows the amount of enforcement that NASCAR is ready to apply their technical procedures on what a car has to do to comply to all specs.”

After being bumped up to the front row, Jamie McMurray said that he was "really proud of everyone at the entire shop. When you come to a 1.5-mile track you're really depending on your car. And our 1.5-mile program last year wasn't where it needed to be. They put a lot of effort into it. Like I said during Speedweeks and all the offseason, this is where you really need to be good. The No. 42 car (teammate Kyle Larson) was fast in practice. He got really loose, it looked like, in his qualifying laps. But then, we were really good as well. So I'm proud of the effort by everybody on the McDonald's Chevrolet. We're off to a good start at the 1.5-mile tracks, which is critical."

After his best qualifying performance on a non-restrictor plate track, Trevor Bayne said that his team is "really looking forward to this low-downforce package, as we've talked about over the offseason. We felt like our best races were at the low downforce tracks, Kentucky and Darlington, so everybody that's wondering what's going on at Roush Fenway Racing – a lot of hard work and a lot of attention to detail. We had a meeting last week talking about execution. Everybody's intentions are right. Everybody wants to go fast. Everybody wants to win races, but now we've got to execute and make sure we make these fast Fords last."

Adam Stevens, crew chief of the No. 18 car, explained that "parts move — everything moves — so you expect it to be a little bit different, but the first opportunity we’ve had to gather post information was right now, and it’s game time and it was too much. We were perfectly legal beforehand, which obviously or we wouldn’t have qualified. Just the amount of load on the track moves everything a little bit and that little bit was a little bit too much.”

=== Qualifying results ===
Pos	No.	Driver	Team	Manufacturer	R1	R2	R3
1	41	Kurt Busch	Stewart–Haas Racing	Chevrolet	28.930	28.930	28.938
2	1	Jamie McMurray	Chip Ganassi Racing	Chevrolet	29.092	28.900	29.159
3	6	Trevor Bayne	Roush Fenway Racing	Ford	28.856	29.111	29.181
4	31	Ryan Newman	Richard Childress Racing	Chevrolet	29.070	29.018	29.185
5	17	Ricky Stenhouse Jr.	Roush Fenway Racing	Ford	29.130	29.086	29.200
6	4	Kevin Harvick	Stewart–Haas Racing	Chevrolet	29.147	29.095	29.213
7	19	Carl Edwards	Joe Gibbs Racing	Toyota	28.969	28.956	29.215
8	3	Austin Dillon	Richard Childress Racing	Chevrolet	29.031	28.945	29.228
9	78	Martin Truex Jr.	Furniture Row Racing	Toyota	29.044	29.022	29.277
10	44	Brian Scott (R)	Richard Petty Motorsports	Ford	29.025	29.096	29.397
11	5	Kasey Kahne	Hendrick Motorsports	Chevrolet	29.068	29.054	29.616
12	11	Denny Hamlin	Joe Gibbs Racing	Toyota	29.110	29.120	—
13	20	Matt Kenseth	Joe Gibbs Racing	Toyota	28.992	29.139	—
14	16	Greg Biffle	Roush Fenway Racing	Ford	29.206	29.151	—
15	13	Casey Mears	Germain Racing	Chevrolet	29.126	29.156	—
16	88	Dale Earnhardt Jr.	Hendrick Motorsports	Chevrolet	29.195	29.207	—
17	2	Brad Keselowski	Team Penske	Ford	29.254	29.311	—
18	14	Ty Dillon (i)	Stewart–Haas Racing	Chevrolet	29.153	29.312	—
19	48	Jimmie Johnson	Hendrick Motorsports	Chevrolet	29.241	29.366	—
20	42	Kyle Larson	Chip Ganassi Racing	Chevrolet	28.897	29.377	—
21	27	Paul Menard	Richard Childress Racing	Chevrolet	29.155	29.378	—
22	47	A. J. Allmendinger	JTG Daugherty Racing	Chevrolet	29.048	29.390	—
23	21	Ryan Blaney (R)	Wood Brothers Racing	Ford	29.215	29.576	—
24	24	Chase Elliott (R)	Hendrick Motorsports	Chevrolet	29.273	—	—
25	10	Danica Patrick	Stewart–Haas Racing	Chevrolet	29.321	—	—
26	22	Joey Logano	Team Penske	Ford	29.327	—	—
27	43	Aric Almirola	Richard Petty Motorsports	Ford	29.401	—	—
28	15	Clint Bowyer	HScott Motorsports	Chevrolet	29.485	—	—
29	38	Landon Cassill	Front Row Motorsports	Ford	29.515	—	—
30	7	Regan Smith	Tommy Baldwin Racing	Chevrolet	29.585	—	—
31	34	Chris Buescher (R)	Front Row Motorsports	Ford	29.628	—	—
32	95	Michael McDowell	Circle Sport – Leavine Family Racing	Chevrolet	29.822	—	—
33	23	David Ragan	BK Racing	Toyota	29.842	—	—
34	46	Michael Annett	HScott Motorsports	Chevrolet	29.868	—	—
35	83	Matt DiBenedetto	BK Racing	Toyota	29.887	—	—
36	98	Cole Whitt	Premium Motorsports	Chevrolet	30.124	—	—
37	30	Josh Wise	The Motorsports Group	Chevrolet	30.160	—	—
38	32	Jeffrey Earnhardt (R)	Go FAS Racing	Ford	30.669	—	—
39	18	Kyle Busch	Joe Gibbs Racing	Toyota	28.681	29.031	—
Official qualifying results
Official starting lineup

== Race ==
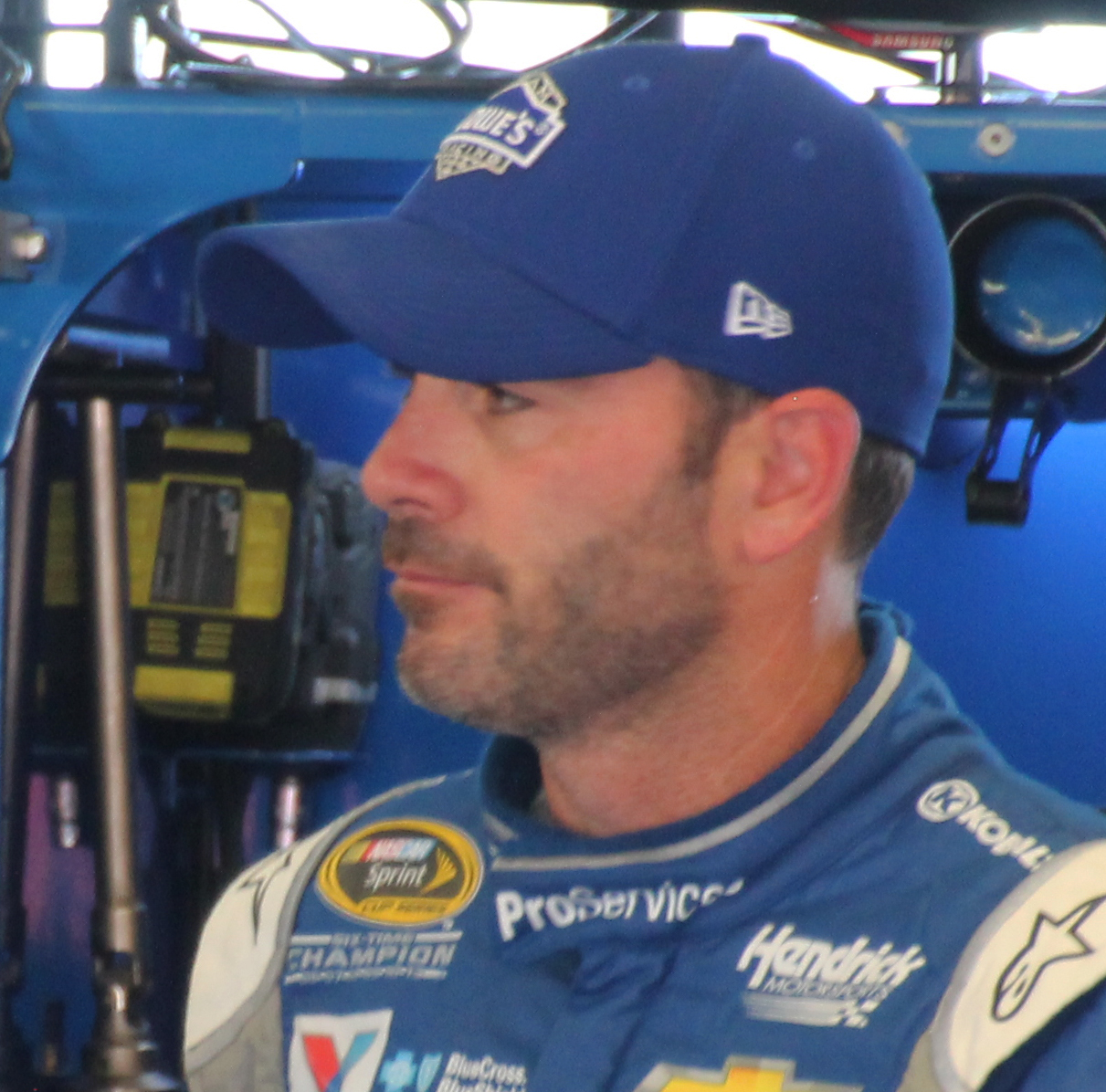
Jimmie Johnson won the race.

=== First half ===
==== Start ====
Under clear blue Georgia skies, Kurt Busch led the field to the green flag at 1:17 p.m. He pulled to a one-second lead after 15 laps. After 30 laps, Martin Truex Jr. caught up to the bumper Busch. He began to lose ground and got passed for second by Matt Kenseth. Kevin Harvick made an unscheduled stop on lap 40 for a flat right-front tire. Being near the end of the fuel window, a number of cars began hitting pit road. Busch gave up the lead to pit on lap 40 and gave the lead to Kenseth. He pitted the next lap and handed the lead to Carl Edwards who also pitted that lap. Kyle Busch assumed the lead. He pitted on lap 42 and handed the lead to Cole Whitt. He pitted the next lap and the lead cycled back to Kurt Busch. Josh Wise was tagged for an uncontrolled tire and was forced to serve a pass-through penalty.

By lap 60, Kenseth caught up to Busch and began battling him for the lead. Going into turn 1, Kenseth dove underneath Busch and took the lead on lap 65. He began putting distance between himself and Busch after three laps. A number of cars began pitting around lap 78 including race leader Kenseth. This handed the lead to Kurt Busch. He pitted on lap 80 and the lead cycled to Jimmie Johnson.

==== Second quarter ====
Kenseth took back the lead from Johnson on lap 85. Johnson began falling back through the running order being on older tires. After 30 laps, Kurt Busch began running down Kenseth. A number of cars began hitting pit road on lap 113. While that was happening, Harvick drove by Kenseth to take the lead on lap 117. He hit pit road the next lap and retained the lead. Kenseth was tagged for "improper fueling" and was forced to serve a pass-through penalty. He was given the black flag with the white cross marks for not pitting within three laps. After eventually serving the penalty, he ended up in 31st two-laps down. He said after the race that he "got black-flagged for some type of pit road penalty and I didn’t know it and pitted the lap they told me to do a pass through – I’m assuming they were black flagging us before that and they pulled our card. I never heard anything about it or at least saw the flag or anything, so I came when they told me to come and I guess they must have penalized us a couple laps or something. I don’t really know. I haven’t really seen it.” Team owner Joe Gibbs said after the race that he thought "we’ve been doing that for a long time, and I was just curious when that change came. So if we missed something on the change, that’s what I was trying to find out. When did that come out and when they did change it because our guys have been laying it there for a long time.” Wise was also tagged for his crew being over the wall too soon and was forced to serve a pass-through penalty. After all that, Truex took over the race lead.

Harvick passed Truex for the lead on lap 136. A number of cars began pitting on lap 150. Harvick hit pit road on lap 151 and the lead cycled to Truex. Joey Logano and Kyle Larson were tagged for a commitment line violation and were forced to serve a pass-through penalty.

=== Second half ===
==== Halfway ====
Harvick took back the lead from Truex on lap 162. Regan Smith was tagged for speeding on pit road and was forced to serve a pass-through penalty. A number of cars began pitting on lap 183. Harvick hit pit road on lap 184 and handed the lead to Johnson. He pitted the next lap and handed the lead to Kyle Busch. He pitted the next lap and the lead cycled back to Harvick. Debris on the backstretch brought out the first caution of the race on lap 210. Whitt was tagged for his crew being over the wall too soon and Aric Almirola was tagged for an uncontrolled tire. Both were forced to restart the race from the tail-end of the field.

The race restarted with 108 laps to go. Harvick pitted with 80 laps to go and retained the lead.

==== Fourth quarter ====
Truex passed Harvick for the lead with 68 laps to go. Harvick passed him back for the lead with 67 laps to go. Truex took back the lead with 65 laps to go. A number of cars began pitting with 49 laps to go. Harvick hit pit road with 40 laps to go and handed the lead to Kyle Busch. Johnson cycled to the lead. Ryan Newman was tagged for his crew being over the wall too soon and was forced to serve a pass-through penalty.

Going into the final 40 laps, Johnson had a 12-second lead over Harvick. With 20 to go, Harvick cut the deficit to half. With three laps to go and Harvick about 5 seconds behind, Ryan Newman spun on the front stretch, bringing out the day's second caution and forcing an overtime finish. The entire field went into the pits for new tires, and Johnson remained in the lead after returning to the track. The race ended under caution after the day's only wreck took four cars out. Almirola, who was caught in the wreck, said that it was "not the finish that we had hoped for. This race was a game in tire management. The tire fall off caused our tires to slide all over the track and made it incredibly difficult to keep the car on the bottom. Once we fell a lap down, it was so hard to get back on the lead lap with how challenging it was to pass in a loose car. But we ran in the Top-20 all afternoon, and we had a competitive car. It was disappointing to have a wreck on the last lap, especially with how hard our team worked, but I know that we’ll be able to bounce back next week in Las Vegas.” Johnson was in the lead at the caution and scored his 76th career victory.

== Post-race ==
=== Driver comments ===
The win tied Johnson with Dale Earnhardt for seventh on NASCAR's all-time wins list. He said in victory lane that it was "such an honor. With the chaos at the end, with the crash and the overtime and how it works these days, I kind of lost sight of that. I remembered on my victory lap, and I had to come down and throw a 3 out the window to pay respects to the man. There's a huge void in my career that I was never able to race with him, but at least I was able to tie his record there."

After finishing runner-up, Dale Earnhardt Jr. said that he felt that his performance "was great because of how we did last week in Daytona. It was critical for us to rebound. Two terrible finishes in a row would put us in such a deep hole points-wise, and what if we could struggle through the year and come close but not win any races? We don't need to cut it close on points. I know we really don't worry about points racing anymore, but when you start the year with two bad runs, you start counting points."

Speaking on the lower-downforce package after a fifth-place finish, Edwards said that NASCAR needs "to keep taking more. This is real racing. We’re driving hard. You can see the guys out here just digging for everything they’re worth. I’m worn out. That’s a tough race and just a lot of fun. I just can’t thank NASCAR enough and Atlanta – don’t ever pave this place – it’s a perfect race track. I hope the fans enjoyed the show. The thing is, just know that in that car we’re driving as hard as we can.”

After leading the most laps in a race at Atlanta for the third straight year, Harvick stumbled on the final restart and finished sixth. He said afterwards that his car "had issues about the last three runs. I had to start driving the car different. It just required a little bit different handling. And then we had a slow pit stop there. We got way behind and the No. 48 (Jimmie Johnson) was way out front and I had to drive the car really hard and got the right rear burned up. We just didn’t execute today but everybody on our Jimmy John’s/Busch Chevrolet hung in there all day and we’ll keep at it.”

=== Penalties ===
On the Wednesday after the race, NASCAR issued a number of penalties to the following teams:

- The No. 78 team was issued a P3 penalty for issues with the roof flap in pre-race inspection. As a result, crew chief Cole Pearn was issued a one-race suspension and a US$50,000 fine. Martin Truex Jr. was also docked 15 points.
- The No. 3, No. 27, No. 31, No. 47 and No. 95 teams were all docked 10 points for P2 violations.

== Race results ==
Pos	No.	Driver	Team	Manufacturer	Laps	Points
1	48	Jimmie Johnson	Hendrick Motorsports	Chevrolet	330	44
2	88	Dale Earnhardt Jr.	Hendrick Motorsports	Chevrolet	330	39
3	18	Kyle Busch	Joe Gibbs Racing	Toyota	330	39
4	41	Kurt Busch	Stewart–Haas Racing	Chevrolet	330	38
5	19	Carl Edwards	Joe Gibbs Racing	Toyota	330	37
6	4	Kevin Harvick	Stewart–Haas Racing	Chevrolet	330	37
7	78	Martin Truex Jr.	Furniture Row Racing	Toyota	330	20
8	24	Chase Elliott (R)	Hendrick Motorsports	Chevrolet	330	33
9	2	Brad Keselowski	Team Penske	Ford	330	32
10	17	Ricky Stenhouse Jr.	Roush Fenway Racing	Ford	330	31
11	3	Austin Dillon	Richard Childress Racing	Chevrolet	330	20
12	22	Joey Logano	Team Penske	Ford	330	29
13	16	Greg Biffle	Roush Fenway Racing	Ford	329	28
14	13	Casey Mears	Germain Racing	Chevrolet	329	27
15	43	Aric Almirola	Richard Petty Motorsports	Ford	328	26
16	11	Denny Hamlin	Joe Gibbs Racing	Toyota	328	25
17	14	Ty Dillon (i)	Stewart–Haas Racing	Chevrolet	328	0
18	27	Paul Menard	Richard Childress Racing	Chevrolet	328	13
19	20	Matt Kenseth	Joe Gibbs Racing	Toyota	328	23
20	10	Danica Patrick	Stewart–Haas Racing	Chevrolet	328	21
21	1	Jamie McMurray	Chip Ganassi Racing	Chevrolet	328	20
22	6	Trevor Bayne	Roush Fenway Racing	Ford	328	19
23	5	Kasey Kahne	Hendrick Motorsports	Chevrolet	328	18
24	31	Ryan Newman	Richard Childress Racing	Chevrolet	328	7
25	21	Ryan Blaney (R)	Wood Brothers Racing	Ford	328	16
26	42	Kyle Larson	Chip Ganassi Racing	Chevrolet	327	15
27	47	A. J. Allmendinger	JTG Daugherty Racing	Chevrolet	326	4
28	34	Chris Buescher (R)	Front Row Motorsports	Ford	326	13
29	83	Matt DiBenedetto	BK Racing	Toyota	326	12
30	46	Michael Annett	HScott Motorsports	Chevrolet	325	11
31	44	Brian Scott (R)	Richard Petty Motorsports	Ford	324	10
32	23	David Ragan	BK Racing	Toyota	323	9
33	95	Michael McDowell	Circle Sport-Leavine Family Racing	Chevrolet	323	–2
34	7	Regan Smith	Tommy Baldwin Racing	Chevrolet	323	7
35	15	Clint Bowyer	HScott Motorsports	Chevrolet	322	6
36	38	Landon Cassill	Front Row Motorsports	Ford	321	5
37	98	Cole Whitt	Premium Motorsports	Chevrolet	318	5
38	32	Jeffrey Earnhardt (R)	GoFas Racing	Ford	313	3
39	30	Josh Wise	The Motorsports Group	Chevrolet	312	2
Official race results

=== Race summary ===
- Lead changes: 28
- Cautions/Laps: 3 for 13
- Red flags: 0
- Time of race: 3 hours, 15 minutes and 38 seconds
- Average speed: 155.863 miles per hour (250.837 km/h)

== Media ==
=== Television ===
The Folds of Honor QuikTrip 500 was carried by Fox in the United States. Mike Joy, five-time Atlanta winner Jeff Gordon and three-time Atlanta winner Darrell Waltrip worked the race from the booth. Pit road was manned by Jamie Little, Vince Welch and Matt Yocum.

Fox
Booth announcers	Pit reporters
Lap-by-lap: Mike Joy; Color commentator: Jeff Gordon; Color commentator: Darrell Waltrip	Jamie Little; Vince Welch; Matt Yocum

=== Radio ===
The race was broadcast on radio by the Performance Racing Network and simulcast on Sirius XM NASCAR Radio. Doug Rice, Mark Garrow and Wendy Venturini called the race from the booth when the field raced down the front stretch. Rob Albright called the race from atop a billboard outside of turn 2 when the field raced through turns 1 and 2. Pat Patterson called the race from a billboard outside of turn 3 when the field raced through turns 3 and 4. On pit road, PRN was manned by Brad Gillie, Brett McMillan, Jim Noble and Steve Richards.

PRN
Booth announcers	Turn announcers	Pit reporters
Lead announcer: Doug Rice; Announcer: Mark Garrow; Announcer: Wendy Venturini	Turns 1 & 2: Rob Albright; Turns 3 & 4: Pat Patterson	Brad Gillie; Brett McMillan; Jim Noble; Steve Richards

== Standings after the race ==
Drivers' Championship standings

	Pos	Driver	Points
2	1	Kyle Busch	78
2	2	Kevin Harvick	74 (–4)
2	3	Carl Edwards	73 (–5)
3	4	Denny Hamlin	70 (–8)
11	5	Jimmie Johnson	70 (–8)
4	6	Kurt Busch	69 (–9)
1	7	Joey Logano	64 (–14)
6	8	Martin Truex Jr.	60 (–18)
3	9	Aric Almirola	55 (–23)
10	10	Brad Keselowski	54 (–24)
1	11	Austin Dillon	53 (–25)
2	12	Matt Kenseth	51 (–27)
9	13	Ricky Stenhouse Jr.	50 (–28)
7	14	Kyle Larson	49 (–29)
2	15	Kasey Kahne	46 (–32)
19	16	Dale Earnhardt Jr.	45 (–33)
Official driver's standings

Manufacturers' Championship standings

Pos	Manufacturer	Points
1	Toyota	84
2	Chevrolet	81 (–3)
3	Ford	67 (–17)
Official manufacturers' standings

- Note: Only the first 16 positions are included for the driver standings.

Previous race: 2016 Daytona 500	Sprint Cup Series; 2016 season	Next race: 2016 Kobalt 400
