= 2015 Folds of Honor QuikTrip 500 =

Race details
- Race 2 of 36 in the 2015 NASCAR Sprint Cup Series
- Date: March 1, 2015
- Location: Atlanta Motor Speedway in Hampton, Georgia
- Course: Permanent racing facility
- Course length: 1.54 miles (2.48 km)
- Distance: 325 laps, 500.5 mi (805.476 km)
- Weather: Overcast skies with a temperature of 41 °F (5 °C); wind out of the northeast at 6.9 mph (11.1 km/h)
- Average speed: 131.078 mph (210.950 km/h)

Pole position
Driver	Joey Logano	Team Penske
- Time: 28.477

Most laps led
Driver	Kevin Harvick	Stewart–Haas Racing
- Laps: 116

Winner
No. 48	Jimmie Johnson	Hendrick Motorsports

Television in the United States
- Network: Fox
- Announcers: Mike Joy, Larry McReynolds and Darrell Waltrip
- Nielsen ratings: 5.1/11 (Overnight); 5.6/12 (Final); 9.5 Million viewers

Radio in the United States
- Radio: PRN
- Booth announcers: Doug Rice and Mark Garrow
- Turn announcers: Rob Albright (1 & 2) and Pat Patterson (3 & 4)

The 2015 Folds of Honor QuikTrip 500 was a NASCAR Sprint Cup Series race held on March 1, 2015, at Atlanta Motor Speedway in Hampton, Georgia. The series was named after co-sponsors, QuikTrip and the nonprofit, Folds of Honor, and it helped raise funds to provide educational assistance to families of U.S. service members killed or disabled in the line of duty. Contested over 325 laps on the 1.54-mile-long (2 km) asphalt quad-oval, it was the second race of the 2015 NASCAR Sprint Cup Series season. Jimmie Johnson won the race, his first win of the season, while Kevin Harvick finished second. Dale Earnhardt Jr., Joey Logano and Matt Kenseth rounded out the top five.

Logano won the pole for the race in a qualifying session that saw 13 cars not post a single timed lap in the first of three rounds. Harvick led a race high of 116 laps on his way to a runner-up finish and his fifth of eight consecutive races finishing first or second. The race had 28 lead changes among 12 different drivers, as well as 10 caution flag periods for 54 laps. There was one red flag for a multi-car wreck in the closing laps of the race that lasted for nine minutes and one second.

Johnson's 71st career victory was his 4th at Atlanta Motor Speedway and the 13th at the track for Hendrick Motorsports. Despite the win, he left Atlanta trailing Logano by one point in the drivers' standings. Chevrolet took over the lead in the manufacturer standings by one over Ford.

The Folds of Honor QuikTrip 500 was carried by Fox Sports on the broadcast Fox network for the American television audience. The radio broadcast for the race was carried by the Performance Racing Network and Sirius XM NASCAR Radio.

== Report ==
=== Background ===
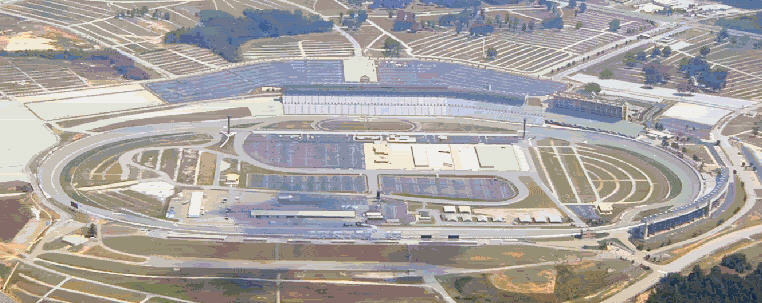
Atlanta Motor Speedway was the site of the second race of the season.

Atlanta Motor Speedway (formerly Atlanta International Raceway) is a track in Hampton, Georgia, 25 miles (40 km) south of Atlanta. It is a 1.54 miles (2.48 km) quad-oval track with a seating capacity of 86,000. It opened in 1960 as a 1.5 miles (2.4 km) standard oval. In 1994, 46 condominiums were built over the northeastern side of the track. In 1997, to standardize the track with Speedway Motorsports' other two 1.5 miles (2.4 km) ovals, the entire track was almost completely rebuilt. The frontstretch and backstretch were swapped, and the configuration of the track was changed from oval to quad-oval. The project made the track one of the fastest on the NASCAR circuit.

Joey Logano entered the race as the points leader for the first time in his career following his win in the Daytona 500. Kevin Harvick, who dominated the race a year ago – leading 195 of the 325 laps before finishing 19th following a late race crash – entered second in the points five back of Logano, while Dale Earnhardt Jr. also entered five points back in third place. Jeff Gordon, who made his first career Sprint Cup Series start at Atlanta in 1992, made his 42nd and final start at the track.

==== Entry list ====
The entry list for the Folds of Honor QuikTrip 500 was released on Monday, February 23, 2015, at 3:07 p.m. Eastern time. Forty-eight drivers were entered for the race, all of whom were entered in the previous week's Daytona 500. Mike Bliss drove the No. 32 Ford for Go FAS Racing. Travis Kvapil drove the No. 44 Chevrolet for Team XTREME Racing in place of Reed Sorenson, who took over the No. 29 Toyota for RAB Racing. Brendan Gaughan drove the No. 62 Chevrolet for Premium Motorsports. Matt DiBenedetto ran the No. 83 Toyota for BK Racing. The No. 98 car for Phil Parsons Racing was entered as a Chevrolet entry.

No.	Driver	Team	Manufacturer
1	Jamie McMurray	Chip Ganassi Racing	Chevrolet
2	Brad Keselowski (PC3)	Team Penske	Ford
3	Austin Dillon	Richard Childress Racing	Chevrolet
4	Kevin Harvick (PC1)	Stewart–Haas Racing	Chevrolet
5	Kasey Kahne	Hendrick Motorsports	Chevrolet
6	Trevor Bayne	Roush Fenway Racing	Ford
7	Alex Bowman	Tommy Baldwin Racing	Chevrolet
9	Sam Hornish Jr.	Richard Petty Motorsports	Ford
10	Danica Patrick	Stewart–Haas Racing	Chevrolet
11	Denny Hamlin	Joe Gibbs Racing	Toyota
13	Casey Mears	Germain Racing	Chevrolet
14	Tony Stewart (PC4)	Stewart–Haas Racing	Chevrolet
15	Clint Bowyer	Michael Waltrip Racing	Toyota
16	Greg Biffle	Roush Fenway Racing	Ford
17	Ricky Stenhouse Jr.	Roush Fenway Racing	Ford
18	David Ragan	Joe Gibbs Racing	Toyota
19	Carl Edwards	Joe Gibbs Racing	Toyota
20	Matt Kenseth (PC5)	Joe Gibbs Racing	Toyota
22	Joey Logano	Team Penske	Ford
23	J. J. Yeley (i)	BK Racing	Toyota
24	Jeff Gordon (PC6)	Hendrick Motorsports	Chevrolet
26	Jeb Burton (R)	BK Racing	Toyota
27	Paul Menard	Richard Childress Racing	Chevrolet
29	Reed Sorenson	RAB Racing	Toyota
30	Ron Hornaday Jr.	The Motorsports Group	Chevrolet
31	Ryan Newman	Richard Childress Racing	Chevrolet
32	Mike Bliss	Go FAS Racing	Ford
33	Brian Scott (i)	Hillman–Circle Sport	Chevrolet
34	Joe Nemechek (i)	Front Row Motorsports	Ford
35	Cole Whitt	Front Row Motorsports	Ford
38	David Gilliland	Front Row Motorsports	Ford
40	Landon Cassill (i)	Hillman–Circle Sport	Chevrolet
41	Regan Smith (i)	Stewart–Haas Racing	Chevrolet
42	Kyle Larson	Chip Ganassi Racing	Chevrolet
43	Aric Almirola	Richard Petty Motorsports	Ford
44	Travis Kvapil (i) (Note: Team XTREME Racing withdrew from the race after the trailer carrying their car was stolen from the team's hotel in the early hours of February 27, 2015.)	Team XTREME Racing	Chevrolet
46	Michael Annett	HScott Motorsports	Chevrolet
47	A. J. Allmendinger	JTG Daugherty Racing	Chevrolet
48	Jimmie Johnson (PC2)	Hendrick Motorsports	Chevrolet
51	Justin Allgaier	HScott Motorsports	Chevrolet
55	Brett Moffitt (R)	Michael Waltrip Racing	Toyota
62	Brendan Gaughan (i)	Premium Motorsports	Chevrolet
66	Mike Wallace	Premium Motorsports	Chevrolet
78	Martin Truex Jr.	Furniture Row Racing	Chevrolet
83	Matt DiBenedetto (R)	BK Racing	Toyota
88	Dale Earnhardt Jr.	Hendrick Motorsports	Chevrolet
95	Michael McDowell	Leavine Family Racing	Ford
98	Josh Wise	Phil Parsons Racing	Ford
Official initial entry list
Official updated entry list

Key	Meaning
(R)	Rookie
(i)	Ineligible for points
(PC#)	Past champions provisional

===== Substitute drivers =====
Several substitute drivers took part in the race. Brett Moffitt drove the No. 55 Toyota in place of Brian Vickers, who would return to the car at Las Vegas Motor Speedway, the series' next scheduled race. Regan Smith once again drove the No. 41 Chevrolet in place of the suspended Kurt Busch. David Ragan was entered to run the No. 34 Ford for Front Row Motorsports, but was selected to run the No. 18 Toyota for Joe Gibbs Racing in place of the injured Kyle Busch. Team owner Joe Gibbs stated that his team appreciated "being able to work with Front Row Motorsports and (sponsor) CSX for David's availability", while also adding that the team "are fortunate to be able to have someone of David's caliber behind the wheel while Kyle recovers". On February 25, Front Row announced that Joe Nemechek would drive the No. 34 car in place of Ragan, with plans beyond that to be determined.

== Test sessions ==
This weekend was the first of five race weekends that included an open test session for any team that wished to participate in it.

=== First session ===
Jamie McMurray was the fastest in the first test session with a time of 28.943 and a speed of 191.549 mph (308.268 km/h).

Pos	No.	Driver	Team	Manufacturer	Time	Speed
1	1	Jamie McMurray	Chip Ganassi Racing	Chevrolet	28.943	191.549
2	42	Kyle Larson	Chip Ganassi Racing	Chevrolet	29.149	190.195
3	4	Kevin Harvick	Stewart–Haas Racing	Chevrolet	29.202	189.850
Official first session results

=== Second session ===
Jeff Gordon was the fastest in the second test session with a time of 29.423 and a speed of 188.424 mph (303.239 km/h).

Pos	No.	Driver	Team	Manufacturer	Time	Speed
1	24	Jeff Gordon	Hendrick Motorsports	Chevrolet	29.423	188.424
2	31	Ryan Newman	Richard Childress Racing	Chevrolet	29.424	188.418
3	4	Kevin Harvick	Stewart–Haas Racing	Chevrolet	29.479	188.066
Official second session results

== Missing car ==
"Sometimes what happens when thieves see trailers, they might just assume there's something in the trailer they can go off and sell. Sometimes when things like this occur, they will drop off the items in a parking lot somewhere – like a Walmart parking lot – once they realize what they have. They'll open it up and say, 'Oh my God, this is not what we thought it was. Let's get out of here.' And they'll take off and leave it sitting there. We're hoping that will be the situation so he can get back to his races this weekend, because they drove quite a distance to participate."

— Morrow Police Sgt. Larry Oglesby told USA Today.

Early Friday morning, a black Ford dually pulling a white trailer carrying the No. 44 Team XTREME Racing Chevrolet was stolen from the team's hotel in Morrow, Georgia. The team's hauler was at the race track having left their race shop in Statesville, North Carolina two days earlier. The car was brought down separately to allow more work to be done on it at the shop. Since the team did not have a backup car, they were forced to withdraw from the race. Ultimately, the car was found the following morning in Loganville, around 40 miles (64 km) northeast of Morrow.

On August 3, 2015, Jason Terry pleaded guilty to the theft of the truck and trailer carrying the team car. The team tweeted about the guilty plea and "[h]ow bad this affected this race team."

== First practice ==
Kyle Larson was the fastest in the first practice session with a time of 28.727 and a speed of 192.989 mph (310.586 km/h).

Pos	No.	Driver	Team	Manufacturer	Time	Speed
1	42	Kyle Larson	Chip Ganassi Racing	Chevrolet	28.727	192.989
2	4	Kevin Harvick	Stewart–Haas Racing	Chevrolet	28.784	192.607
3	18	David Ragan	Joe Gibbs Racing	Toyota	28.793	192.547
Official first practice results

== Qualifying ==
"When you have this many teams having issues going through, there's something wrong with this system or something wrong with the amount of time they allotted to get through. There's no way with this many good cars and talented people that they can't figure out how to get these cars through inspection. These guys are too smart and yeah, we're pushing limits, but there's something wrong here. It's ridiculous. The fans, they deserve an apology. I don't know how many cars are still back here that never got the chance to get on the track. I know we went through twice. When you have this many? I've seen five or six, maybe ten cars that have issues going with certain little things. But this many cars that didn't go? That's not on these teams. They deserve better than this, I can't believe how disappointing this is."

— Jeff Gordon, commenting on the technical issues that dogged the qualifying session.

Joey Logano won the pole with a time of 28.477 and a speed of 194.683 mph (313.312 km/h). Logano felt that it was "such a great way to follow Daytona" and that his team "ha[d] a lot of momentum and [they] definitely want to keep it going". The start of qualifying was delayed by 20 minutes because a number of cars had to go through NASCAR technical inspection more than once. Eventually, NASCAR decided to start the session anyway. As a result, 13 of the 47 cars never had a chance to post a lap time before the first round of qualifying ended. The issues angered several drivers and team managers.

=== Qualifying results ===
Pos	No.	Driver	Team	Manufacturer	R1	R2	R3
1	22	Joey Logano	Team Penske	Ford	28.542	28.586	28.477
2	4	Kevin Harvick (Note: Kevin Harvick qualified second, but started from the rear after losing an engine in the final practice session.)	Stewart–Haas Racing	Chevrolet	28.957	28.560	28.608
3	1	Jamie McMurray	Chip Ganassi Racing	Chevrolet	28.754	28.673	28.633
4	11	Denny Hamlin	Joe Gibbs Racing	Toyota	28.689	28.626	28.666
5	19	Carl Edwards	Joe Gibbs Racing	Toyota	28.719	28.756	28.705
6	42	Kyle Larson	Chip Ganassi Racing	Chevrolet	28.727	28.732	28.733
7	31	Ryan Newman	Richard Childress Racing	Chevrolet	28.864	28.776	28.734
8	9	Sam Hornish Jr.	Richard Petty Motorsports	Ford	28.997	28.799	28.828
9	88	Dale Earnhardt Jr.	Hendrick Motorsports	Chevrolet	28.880	28.683	28.844
10	5	Kasey Kahne	Hendrick Motorsports	Chevrolet	28.760	28.805	28.854
11	47	A. J. Allmendinger	JTG Daugherty Racing	Chevrolet	28.989	28.811	28.953
12	2	Brad Keselowski	Team Penske	Ford	28.894	28.821	28.965
13	27	Paul Menard	Richard Childress Racing	Chevrolet	28.915	28.826	—
14	78	Martin Truex Jr.	Furniture Row Racing	Chevrolet	28.745	28.828	—
15	3	Austin Dillon	Richard Childress Racing	Chevrolet	28.843	28.853	—
16	51	Justin Allgaier	HScott Motorsports	Chevrolet	28.999	28.870	—
17	18	David Ragan	Joe Gibbs Racing	Toyota	28.825	28.951	—
18	10	Danica Patrick	Stewart–Haas Racing	Chevrolet	29.104	28.982	—
19	16	Greg Biffle	Roush Fenway Racing	Ford	29.054	29.036	—
20	17	Ricky Stenhouse Jr.	Roush Fenway Racing	Ford	29.050	29.073	—
21	13	Casey Mears	Germain Racing	Chevrolet	28.963	29.079	—
22	55	Brett Moffitt (R)	Michael Waltrip Racing	Toyota	28.955	29.080	—
23	43	Aric Almirola	Richard Petty Motorsports	Ford	29.141	29.114	—
24	95	Michael McDowell	Leavine Family Racing	Ford	29.220	29.247	—
25	15	Clint Bowyer	Michael Waltrip Racing	Toyota	29.254	—	—
26	38	David Gilliland	Front Row Motorsports	Ford	29.257	—	—
27	32	Mike Bliss (i)	Go FAS Racing	Ford	29.279	—	—
28	34	Joe Nemechek (i)	Front Row Motorsports	Ford	29.305	—	—
29	6	Trevor Bayne	Roush Fenway Racing	Ford	29.348	—	—
30	23	J. J. Yeley (i)	BK Racing	Toyota	29.460	—	—
31	62	Brendan Gaughan (i)	Premium Motorsports	Chevrolet	29.471	—	—
32	33	Brian Scott (i) (Note: Brian Scott, who qualified the car, gave up his seat to allow Michael Annett to race for drivers points.)	Hillman–Circle Sport	Chevrolet	29.515	—	—
33	98	Josh Wise	Phil Parsons Racing	Chevrolet	30.150	—	—
34	30	Ron Hornaday Jr.	The Motorsports Group	Chevrolet	30.605	—	—
35	24	Jeff Gordon	Hendrick Motorsports	Chevrolet	0.000	—	—
36	20	Matt Kenseth	Joe Gibbs Racing	Toyota	0.000	—	—
37	48	Jimmie Johnson	Hendrick Motorsports	Chevrolet	0.000	—	—
38	41	Regan Smith (i)	Stewart–Haas Racing	Chevrolet	0.000	—	—
39	14	Tony Stewart (Note: Tony Stewart dropped to the rear of the field for missing driver introductions.)	Stewart–Haas Racing	Chevrolet	0.000	—	—
40	26	Jeb Burton (R)	BK Racing	Toyota	0.000	—	—
41	35	Cole Whitt	Front Row Motorsports	Ford	0.000	—	—
42	7	Alex Bowman	Tommy Baldwin Racing	Chevrolet	0.000	—	—
43	40	Landon Cassill (i)	Hillman–Circle Sport	Chevrolet	0.000	—	—
Did not qualify
44	29	Reed Sorenson	RAB Racing	Toyota	0.000	—	—
45	46	Michael Annett (Note: Michael Annett, who originally failed to qualify for the race, drove the No. 33 Hillman–Circle Sport Chevrolet in place of Brian Scott.)	HScott Motorsports	Chevrolet	0.000	—	—
46	66	Mike Wallace	Premium Motorsports	Chevrolet	0.000	—	—
47	83	Matt DiBenedetto (R)	BK Racing	Toyota	0.000	—	—
Official qualifying results

=== Driver change (post-qualifying) ===
Michael Annett, who originally failed to qualify for the race, drove the No. 33 Hillman–Circle Sport Chevrolet in place of Brian Scott. Scott, who regularly competes in the Xfinity Series, voluntarily gave up his spot because, unlike himself, Annett is running for drivers points in the Sprint Cup Series. "It's a big deal," Annett said before Saturday's first practice. "I can't thank Mike Hillman and Brian Scott enough. We'd rather be in the (No.) 46 HScott Motorsport car, but we're running full-time and we need as many driver's points as we can get. Unfortunately, we won't get any owner's points for this, but being with a new crew chief, with Jay Guy, it's another hour-and-half of practice and another 500 miles (on Sunday) to work together. So looking back, we could have either gone home and watched this race or be able to work together so when we go to Las Vegas we're even stronger. I can't thank these guys enough for giving us this opportunity."

On race day, Annett's HScott Motorsports team ran the car, but under NASCAR rules, Circle Sport owner Joe Falk was credited with the owners' points.

== Final practice ==
Kevin Harvick was the fastest in the final practice session with a time of 29.018 and a speed of 191.054 mph (307.472 km/h). During the session, Harvick's car blew an engine and meant that he would have to start from the rear of the field. Harvick described the failure as "very rare" and that he was "glad that it happened today".

Pos	No.	Driver	Team	Manufacturer	Time	Speed
1	4	Kevin Harvick	Stewart–Haas Racing	Chevrolet	29.018	191.054
2	5	Kasey Kahne	Hendrick Motorsports	Chevrolet	29.209	189.805
3	3	Austin Dillon	Richard Childress Racing	Chevrolet	29.218	189.746
Official final practice results

== Race ==
=== First-half ===
==== Start ====
The race was scheduled to start at 1:16 p.m. on Sunday, but the start was delayed by overnight showers and track drying. The field rolled off pit road shortly after 1:45 p.m. and made a number of laps around the track and down pit road under caution speed. Finally, nearly an hour after the scheduled start time, Joey Logano lead the field to the green flag at 2:12 p.m. He pulled out to a four-second lead until the first caution of the race flew on lap 26 for overnight showers. This caution was a saving grace for Ricky Stenhouse Jr. who had a right-rear tire going down. Joe Nemechek stayed out to lead a lap before pitting and handing the lead back to Logano.

The race restarted on lap 32. Denny Hamlin tried to keep pace with Logano, but could not hang onto the point. Sam Hornish Jr. was forced to make an unscheduled stop on lap 42 to remove a windshield tear-off that was blocking the air intake of his car. The second caution of the race flew on lap 46 for Austin Dillon cutting down his right-rear tire and a piece of debris on the backstretch. Jeff Gordon hit a piece of the debris that created a hole 3 in (76 mm) in diameter.

==== Trouble for Austin Dillon ====
The race restarted on lap 52. The third caution of the race flew on lap 60 for Austin Dillon cutting another right-rear tire and spun out in turn 1. His car came to a halt in the wet grass and was covered in mud by the time he got it out. Opening of pit road was delayed as a piece of rubber was caught stuck on the top of the catch fencing on the backstretch. Mike Bliss stayed out to lead a lap before hitting pit road and handing the lead back to Joey Logano.

The race restarted on lap 71 and Logano just jumped out ahead with relative ease. Eleven laps into the run, Kevin Harvick narrowed the game to half a second. He eventually took the lead on lap 87 after Logano got loose exiting turn 4. The fourth caution of the race flew on lap 94 after Landon Cassill blew an engine in turn 3. David Gilliland stayed out to take the lead before hitting pit road and handing the lead back to Harvick.

==== Green flag stops ====
The race restarted on lap 100. Joey Logano began to fall back as Harvick pulled to a two-second lead over Denny Hamlin. A number of cars started hitting pit road on lap 138 that triggered a rush of cars. Kevin Harvick gave up the lead on lap 140 to pit and handed the lead to Denny Hamlin. He stopped the next lap and gave the lead to Brad Keselowski who stopped the next lap and the lead cycled to Matt Kenseth, who was one of the first cars to pit on lap 138. Mike Bliss and Ron Hornaday Jr. had to serve a drive-through penalty for speeding on pit road. Eventually, Harvick took back the lead on lap 150.

=== Second-half ===
Matt Kenseth made an unscheduled stop on lap 168 for a possible vibration. He was running eighth at the time and exited pit road 28th and one lap down. To add insult to injury, he got trapped by the fifth caution of the race on lap 175 for debris on the front stretch. Kevin Harvick entered pit road as the race leader, but Denny Hamlin beat him off pit road to take the lead. The race restarted on lap 181, but did not make it more than a lap before debris brought out the sixth caution of the race after Jeb Burton hit the wall. Matt Kenseth made it back onto the lead lap.

The race restarted on lap 187. Kevin Harvick spun the tires on the restart and fell back a bit, but quickly climbed back to the tail of Hamlin in less than a lap. By lap 191, Harvick took back the lead. Eight laps later, Jimmie Johnson took the lead for the first time in the race. Harvick began running down Johnson with 110 laps to go. A number of cars hit pit road with 102 laps to go starting a rush of green flag stops. Johnson gave up the lead with 101 laps to go to pit and handed the lead to Casey Mears. He did not lead a lap as he was pitted before the start/finish line. As a result, Kevin Harvick cycled to the lead.

Casey Mears slapped the wall exiting turn 4 right in front of the leader. This allowed Jimmie Johnson to reel in Kevin Harvick momentarily before the latter pulled away. Debris on the backstretch brought out the seventh caution of the race with 74 laps to go. Jimmie Johnson beat Harvick off pit road to take back the lead.

==== Trouble on the backstretch ====
"It wouldn't have been too bad, but I found that one spot where there is no SAFER barrier. I can't believe it. That's amazing to me. Anyway. Hopefully now that will get fixed. I don't think we can say anymore after Kyle's incident in Daytona. Everybody knows they've got to do something and it should have been done a long time ago, but all we can do now is hope they can do it as fast as they possibly can and get it done. I knew it was a hard hit; I didn't expect it to be that hard. I got out and I looked and I was like, 'Oh, big surprise, I found the one wall here on the back straightaway that doesn't have a SAFER barrier'."

— Jeff Gordon, commenting on his crash and the safety issue stemming from Kyle Busch's crash at Daytona.

The race restarted with 69 laps to go and the eighth caution flew for a multi-car wreck on the backstretch. It started when Denny Hamlin got loose exiting turn 2, turned down into Ryan Newman who turned into Jamie McMurray who clipped Jeff Gordon who hit the inside wall head on, just beyond the end of the SAFER barrier. The race restarted with 63 laps to go. Carl Edwards was running eighth when he had a left-rear tire go down.

Kevin Harvick and Brad Keselowski started the last pit stop sequence of the race with 33 laps to go. Jimmie Johnson surrendered the lead with 32 laps to go and handed the lead to Clint Bowyer. He gave up the lead to pit with 30 laps to go and Brett Moffitt assumed the lead. He gave up the lead the next lap and the lead cycled back to Johnson. Kasey Kahne was forced to serve a drive-through penalty for an uncontrolled tire. To make matters worse for him, the ninth caution of the race flew with 28 laps to go when Cole Whitt lost an engine in turn 1. Matt Kenseth, who at one point was two laps down, stayed out when Johnson pitted to take back the lead.

==== Big wreck in Turn 3 and finish ====
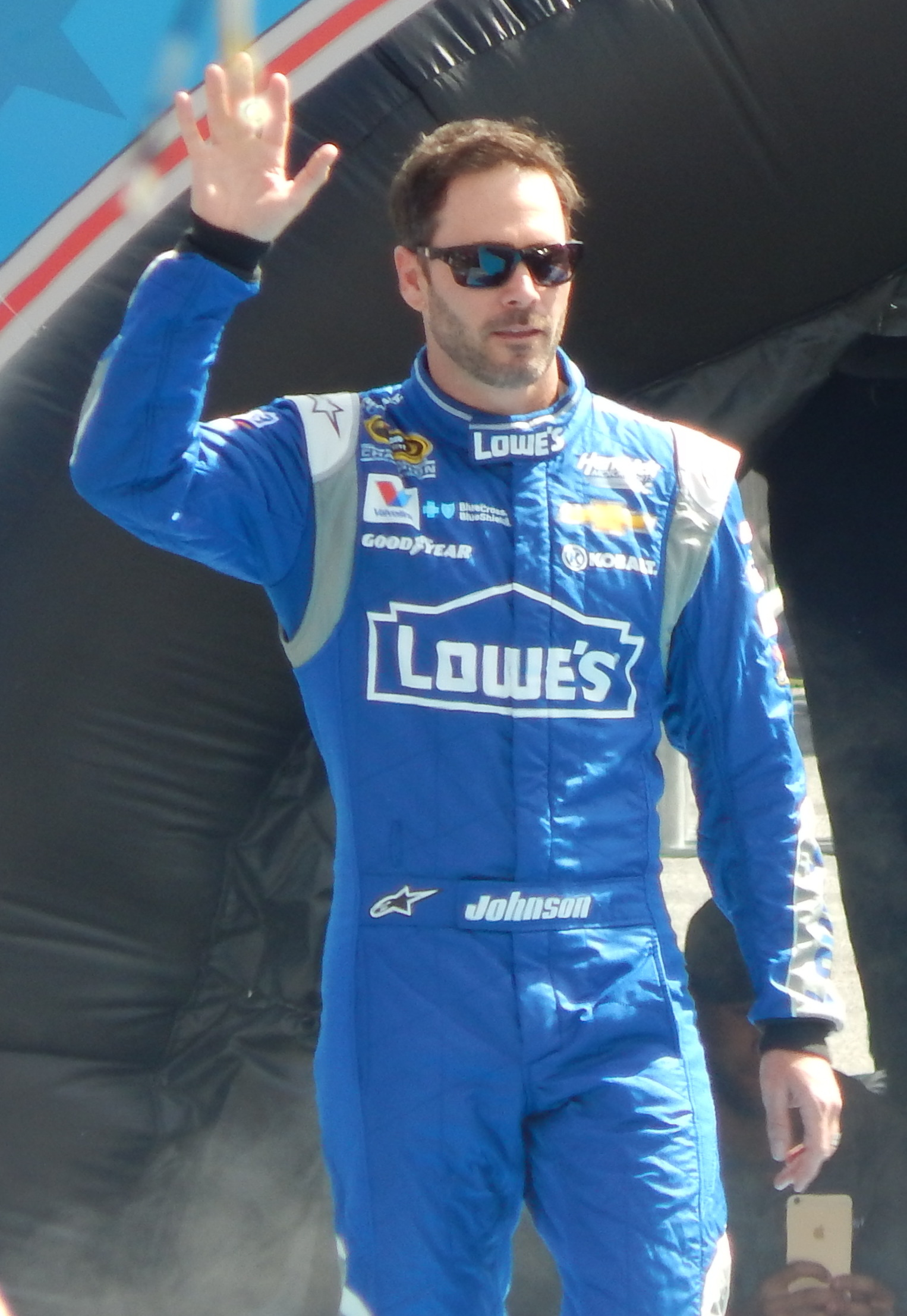
Jimmie Johnson, seen here at the 2015 Daytona 500, scored his 71st career win at Atlanta.

The race restarted with 21 laps to go, before a major multi-car wreck occurred in turn 3, bringing out a 10th caution and involving an octet of cars. The incident started when Greg Biffle drove to the inside of Joe Nemechek entering Turn 3, but they made contact, sending both cars sliding up the track. Bowyer, Hornish Jr., Kyle Larson, Tony Stewart, Regan Smith and Ricky Stenhouse Jr. were also involved. On team radio, Nemechek was critical of Biffle's driving stating that he did not "know how he got me there in the left rear, that was messed up". The race was red flagged for nine minutes and 1 second in order to facilitate cleanup on the track with 20 laps to go. The race restarted with 14 laps to go and Jimmie Johnson held off Kevin Harvick to score his 71st career victory.

=== Post-race ===
==== Driver comments ====
In victory lane, Johnson stated that the result said "a lot of good things" and he was "just so excited that the guys could understand...so, this new team could understand what I was complaining about and things I didn't like about my race car". Harvick explained that he "had one bad restart there where I spun the tires on the outside and we just never recovered from that one" but stated that he had "to thank everybody on this car for everything they do".

=== Race results ===
Pos	No.	Driver	Team	Manufacturer	Laps	Points
1	48	Jimmie Johnson	Hendrick Motorsports	Chevrolet	325	47
2	4	Kevin Harvick	Stewart–Haas Racing	Chevrolet	325	44
3	88	Dale Earnhardt Jr.	Hendrick Motorsports	Chevrolet	325	42
4	22	Joey Logano	Team Penske	Ford	325	41
5	20	Matt Kenseth	Joe Gibbs Racing	Toyota	325	40
6	78	Martin Truex Jr.	Furniture Row Racing	Chevrolet	325	38
7	47	A. J. Allmendinger	JTG Daugherty Racing	Chevrolet	325	37
8	55	Brett Moffitt (R)	Michael Waltrip Racing	Toyota	325	37
9	2	Brad Keselowski	Team Penske	Ford	325	36
10	31	Ryan Newman	Richard Childress Racing	Chevrolet	325	34
11	43	Aric Almirola	Richard Petty Motorsports	Ford	325	33
12	19	Carl Edwards	Joe Gibbs Racing	Toyota	325	32
13	27	Paul Menard	Richard Childress Racing	Chevrolet	325	31
14	5	Kasey Kahne	Hendrick Motorsports	Chevrolet	324	30
15	13	Casey Mears	Germain Racing	Chevrolet	324	29
16	10	Danica Patrick	Stewart–Haas Racing	Chevrolet	324	28
17	41	Regan Smith (i)	Stewart–Haas Racing	Chevrolet	324	0
18	18	David Ragan	Joe Gibbs Racing	Toyota	323	26
19	6	Trevor Bayne	Roush Fenway Racing	Ford	323	25
20	51	Justin Allgaier	HScott Motorsports	Chevrolet	323	24
21	9	Sam Hornish Jr.	Richard Petty Motorsports	Ford	323	23
22	38	David Gilliland	Front Row Motorsports	Ford	322	23
23	7	Alex Bowman	Tommy Baldwin Racing	Chevrolet	322	21
24	15	Clint Bowyer	Michael Waltrip Racing	Toyota	321	21
25	16	Greg Biffle	Roush Fenway Racing	Ford	320	19
26	42	Kyle Larson	Chip Ganassi Racing	Chevrolet	320	18
27	95	Michael McDowell	Leavine Family Racing	Ford	320	17
28	62	Brendan Gaughan (i)	Premium Motorsports	Chevrolet	320	0
29	33	Michael Annett	Hillman–Circle Sport	Chevrolet	319	15
30	14	Tony Stewart	Stewart–Haas Racing	Chevrolet	319	14
31	32	Mike Bliss (i)	Go FAS Racing	Ford	318	0
32	98	Josh Wise	Phil Parsons Racing	Ford	318	12
33	34	Joe Nemechek (i)	Front Row Motorsports	Ford	318	0
34	23	J. J. Yeley (i)	BK Racing	Toyota	316	0
35	26	Jeb Burton (R)	BK Racing	Toyota	316	9
36	17	Ricky Stenhouse Jr.	Roush Fenway Racing	Ford	302	8
37	35	Cole Whitt	Front Row Motorsports	Ford	295	7
38	11	Denny Hamlin	Joe Gibbs Racing	Toyota	284	7
39	3	Austin Dillon	Richard Childress Racing	Chevrolet	282	5
40	1	Jamie McMurray	Chip Ganassi Racing	Chevrolet	256	4
41	24	Jeff Gordon	Hendrick Motorsports	Chevrolet	256	3
42	30	Ron Hornaday Jr.	The Motorsports Group	Chevrolet	187	2
43	40	Landon Cassill (i)	Hillman–Circle Sport	Chevrolet	92	0
Official Folds of Honor QuikTrip 500 results

=== Race statistics ===
- 28 lead changes among 12 different drivers
- 10 cautions for 54 laps; 1 red flag for 9 minutes, 1 second
- Time of race: 3 hours, 49 minutes, 6 seconds
- Average speed: 131.078 mph (210.950 km/h)
- Jimmie Johnson took home $335,901 in winnings

Lap Leaders
Laps	Leader
1–27	Joey Logano
28	Joe Nemechek
29–48	Joey Logano
49	Mike Bliss
50–67	Joey Logano
68	Mike Bliss
69–86	Joey Logano
87–95	Kevin Harvick
96	Joey Logano
97	David Gilliland
98–138	Kevin Harvick
139	Denny Hamlin
140–141	Brad Keselowski
142–147	Matt Kenseth
148–176	Kevin Harvick
177–189	Denny Hamlin
190–197	Kevin Harvick
198–211	Jimmie Johnson
212	Kevin Harvick
213–225	Jimmie Johnson
226–253	Kevin Harvick
254–261	Jimmie Johnson
262	Dale Earnhardt Jr.
263–293	Jimmie Johnson
294	Clint Bowyer
295	Brett Moffitt
296–300	Jimmie Johnson
301–304	Matt Kenseth
305–325	Jimmie Johnson

Total laps led
Leader	Laps
Kevin Harvick	116
Jimmie Johnson	92
Joey Logano	84
Denny Hamlin	14
Brad Keselowski	2
Mike Bliss	2
Dale Earnhardt Jr.	1
Brett Moffitt	1
David Gilliland	1
Clint Bowyer	1
Joe Nemechek	1

==== Race awards ====
- Coors Light Pole Award: Joey Logano (28.477, 194.683 mph (313.312 km/h))
- 3M Lap Leader: Kevin Harvick (116 laps)
- American Ethanol Green Flag Restart Award: Joey Logano (30.553, 181.455 mph (292.024 km/h))
- Duralast Brakes "Brake in The Race" Award: Joey Logano
- Freescale "Wide Open": Kevin Harvick
- Ingersoll Rand Power Move: Kevin Harvick, 8 positions
- MAHLE Clevite Engine Builder of the Race: Hendrick Engines, #4
- Mobil 1 Driver of the Race: Kevin Harvick (131.2 driver rating)
- Moog Steering and Suspension Problem Solver of The Race: Jimmie Johnson (crew chief Chad Knaus, 0.340 seconds)
- NASCAR Sprint Cup Leader Bonus: No winner: rolls over to $30,000 at next event
- Sherwin-Williams Fastest Lap: Denny Hamlin (Lap 2, 29.238, 189.616 mph (305.157 km/h))
- Sunoco Rookie of The Race: Jeb Burton

== Media ==
=== Television ===
Fox Sports covered their eleventh race at the Atlanta Motor Speedway, and their first since 2010. Mike Joy, Larry McReynolds, and three-time Atlanta winner Darrell Waltrip had the call in the booth for the race. Jamie Little, Chris Neville, and Matt Yocum handled the pit road duties for the television side.

Fox Television
Booth announcers	Pit reporters
Lap-by-lap: Mike Joy; Color-commentator: Larry McReynolds; Color commentator: Darrell Waltrip	Matt Yocum; Jamie Little; Chris Neville

=== Radio ===
PRN had the radio call for the race which was also simulcasted on Sirius XM NASCAR Radio. Doug Rice and Mark Garrow called the race in the booth when the field went racing through the front stretch. Rob Albright called the race from a billboard in turn 2 when the field went racing through turns 1 and 2 and halfway down the backstretch. Pat Patterson called the race from atop the condos outside of turn 4 when the field went racing through the other half of the backstretch and through turns 3 and 4. Brad Gillie, Brett McMillan, Steve Richards, and Wendy Venturini worked pit road for the radio side.

PRN Radio
Booth announcers	Turn announcers	Pit reporters
Lead announcer: Doug Rice; Announcer: Mark Garrow	Turns 1 & 2: Rob Albright; Turns 3 & 4: Pat Patterson	Brad Gillie; Brett McMillan; Steve Richards; Wendy Venturini

== Standings after the race ==
Drivers' Championship standings

	Pos	Driver	Points
	1	Joey Logano	88
3	2	Jimmie Johnson	87 (−1)
1	3	Kevin Harvick	86 (−2)
1	4	Dale Earnhardt Jr.	84 (−4)
3	5	Martin Truex Jr.	75 (−13)
	6	Casey Mears	68 (−20)
2	7	Kasey Kahne	65 (−23)
9	8	A. J. Allmendinger	62 (−26)
6	9	Aric Almirola	62 (−26)
3	10	Clint Bowyer	58 (−30)
	11	David Gilliland	56 (−32)
	12	Sam Hornish Jr.	55 (−33)
3	13	Greg Biffle	54 (−34)
6	14	Carl Edwards	54 (−34)
1	15	David Ragan	53 (−35)
2	16	Danica Patrick	51 (−37)

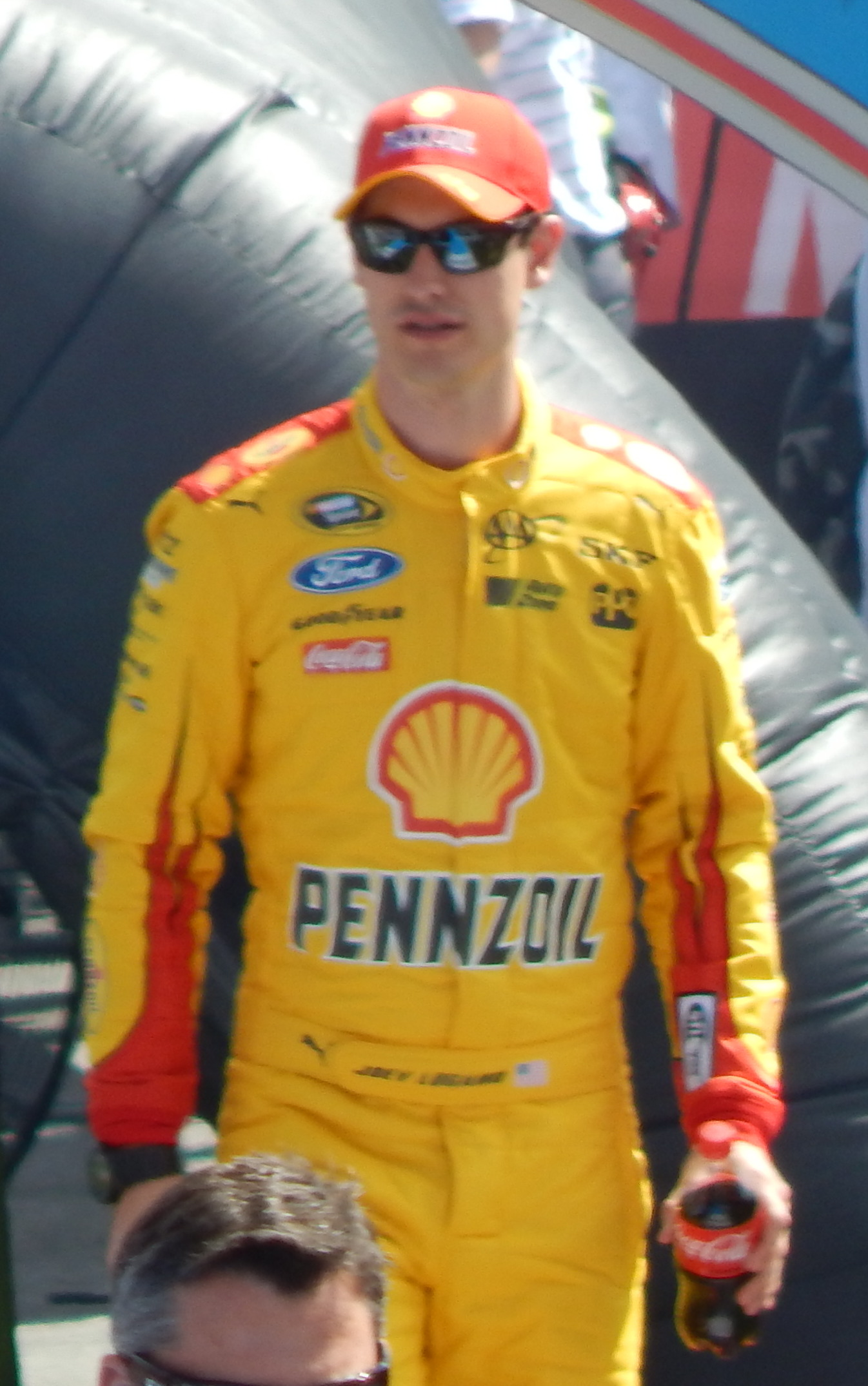
Joey Logano left Atlanta Motor Speedway with a one-point lead over Jimmie Johnson.

Manufacturers' Championship standings

	Pos	Manufacturer	Points
1	1	Chevrolet	89
1	2	Ford	88 (−1)
	3	Toyota	81 (−8)

- Note: Only the first sixteen positions are included for the driver standings.

== Notes ==
Previous race: 2015 Daytona 500	Sprint Cup Series; 2015 season	Next race: 2015 Kobalt 400
