= NASCAR Cup Series at Atlanta Motor Speedway =

NASCAR Cup Series races at Atlanta Motor Speedway

NASCAR Cup Series
- Venue: Atlanta Motor Speedway
- Location: Hampton, Georgia, United States

Circuit information
- Surface: Asphalt
- Length: 1.54 mi (2.48 km)
- Turns: 4

Stock car races in the NASCAR Cup Series have been held at Atlanta Motor Speedway in Hampton, Georgia since the track's opening in 1960.

== Spring race ==
Autotrader 400
- Corporate sponsor: Autotrader
- First race: 1960
- Distance: 400.4 miles (644.4 km)
- Laps: 260; Stage 1: 60; Final 2 stages: 100 each
- Previous names: Dixie 300 (1960); Dixie 400 (1961–1966); Dixie 500 (1967–1979); Atlanta Journal 500 (1980–1990); Hardee's 500 (1991); Hooters 500 (1992–1994); NAPA 500 (1995–2002); Bass Pro Shops MBNA 500 (2003–2006); Pep Boys Auto 500 (2007–2009); Emory Healthcare 500 (2010); AdvoCare 500 (2011–2013); Oral-B USA 500 (2014); Folds of Honor QuikTrip 500 (2015–2022); Ambetter Health 400 (2023–2025)
- Most wins (driver): Richard Petty; Dale Earnhardt; Bobby Labonte; Jimmie Johnson (4)
- Most wins (team): Hendrick Motorsports (10)
- Most wins (manufacturer): Chevrolet (25)

The Autotrader 400 is the current name for the spring race. Tyler Reddick is the defending race winner, having won it in 2026.

This race was originally Atlanta's second race of the season and was run as a late-season event for much of its history. From 1987 until 2001, the race was scheduled in November as the final race of the NASCAR season. From 2002 until 2008, the race was moved to October in favor of awarding the final race weekend to Homestead–Miami Speedway and became part of what is now the NASCAR playoffs in 2004. In 2009, Atlanta swapped fall race dates with Auto Club Speedway and the race was moved to Labor Day weekend. From 2011 to 2020, this was Atlanta's only Cup Series race date as its spring race was moved to Kentucky Speedway and run later in the year.

In 2015, the race lost its place as the Labor Day weekend race for the Cup Series and became the second race of the season (after the season-opening Daytona 500). In 2020, it was moved from being the second race of the season to being the first race after the west coast swing (the races at Las Vegas, Phoenix and Fontana), making it the fifth race of the Cup Series season. However, the race would end up being run in June that year due to the COVID-19 pandemic (and it was the first Cup Series race to be postponed due to the pandemic). In 2021, the race was held as scheduled in March as the fifth race of the season.

=== History ===
From 1987 until 2001, the race was scheduled as the final race of the NASCAR season, and thus was typically the event in which the champion was decided. Several times, however, the championship had already been clinched prior to this race, rendering the race anticlimactic. In some cases, the championship would be decided the moment the points leader took the green flag to start the race – effectively clinching enough championship points by finishing last or better. Other times the championship might be decided early or mid-race, well before the checkered flag. For instance, in the 1993 race, Dale Earnhardt needed to finish 34th or better to mathematically clinch the championship. On lap 117 of 328, eight cars had dropped out of the race (including teammate Neil Bonnett in an intentional start and park). That meant Earnhardt could finish no worse than 34th and had effectively clinched the title before the race had reached the halfway point.

The 1992 race marked the final race for Richard Petty, and coincidentally, the debut for Jeff Gordon. With six drivers eligible for the Winston Cup Championship, the race is widely regarded as one of the greatest NASCAR races of all time. Alan Kulwicki, who finished second in the race, edged out Bill Elliott, the race winner, by leading one more lap in the race. Kulwicki won the NASCAR Winston Cup title by a then-record margin of only 10 points.

The 1998 race was run mostly at night after a long rain delay; despite the inexperience with the lights, newly installed for an Indy Racing League race, NASCAR and the teams agreed to attempt finishing the race at night. It was shortened to 221 laps because it was after 11:00 p.m. EST and NASCAR wanted to "get the fans out at a decent hour". The 1999 Cracker Barrel 500 also ended at night. This would mark a springboard of sorts for finishing delayed races at night by utilizing a track's permanent lighting system.

In 2001, the race was scheduled as the season finale; however, it ended up being the second-to-last race. The New Hampshire 300 was postponed from September 16 to the Friday after Thanksgiving, due to 9/11. Beginning in 2002 the race was moved to mid-October as NASCAR elected to hold its final race at Homestead–Miami Speedway instead of Atlanta. The 2003 race started a tradition of night qualifying at Atlanta, which has carried over to the spring race as well.

In 2006, the race start time was changed from 12:40 pm. EDT to 2:55 pm. EDT to finish the race at night. Driver complaints erupted because of the track's troublesome situation, where the sun can get into the driver's eyes in Turn 1, including leading to a crash during the time the sun sets in that area of the track between Jeff Gordon and Jamie McMurray, which led to the abandonment of the 3 pm start after this race.

During the race's history as the second in Atlanta, it had been rumored to be either eliminated or moved several times in recent years. On February 29, 2008, it was reported that Bruton Smith, the president of the track's owner, Speedway Motorsports, was talking with International Speedway Corporation (the owner of numerous other NASCAR tracks) about a possible date switch for 2009 with one of its tracks. He proposed a move that involved the fall Atlanta race and the Pepsi 500, the Labor Day weekend race held at Auto Club Speedway. Doing so would give the Fontana, California track a race in the Chase for the Championship and also make the three races that precede the beginning of the Chase closer to each other geographically. Prior to the realignment, the teams raced in the Sharpie 500 at Bristol the week before Labor Day, then traveled cross country to California for the Pepsi 500, and then came back across the country to run the Chevy Rock & Roll 400 at Richmond the following Saturday. Smith's offer to have Atlanta as the Labor Day weekend race was accepted and was officially announced by NASCAR on August 19, 2008. However, instead of moving the race at Auto Club Speedway (previously on Labor Day weekend) to Atlanta's spot on the schedule at the end of October, the AMP Energy 500 at Talladega Superspeedway was moved to that spot after previously being at the beginning of October, and the aforementioned Pepsi 500 was moved to the beginning of October in Talladega's old spot.

In 2015, Atlanta's lone race date moved to the second week of the season in early March, with the Southern 500 at Darlington Raceway returning to its traditional Labor Day weekend date. Atlanta will be run on a Sunday afternoon. This event used to be called the Oral-B USA 500, and this event used to be aired on ESPN for 6 years preceding the Irwin Tools Night Race at Bristol Motor Speedway and the Federated Auto Parts 400 at Richmond International Raceway

On July 10, 2022, the track announced that Ambetter would be the title sponsor of the race starting in 2023. The company, owned by Centene Corporation, was the title sponsor of the Ambetter Get Vaccinated 200 at New Hampshire Motor Speedway (another Speedway Motorsports-owned track) in 2021 and the Cup Series race at New Hampshire in 2022. QuikTrip, one of the two title sponsors of the race since 2015, announced prior to the 2022 race that it would be their last year as title sponsor. Folds of Honor, the other title sponsor of the race, did not return in 2023 as their title sponsorship was a result of a partnership they have with QuikTrip.

=== Past winners ===
Year	Date	No.	Driver	Team	Manufacturer	Race distance		Race time	Average speed (mph)	Report	Ref
Year	Date	No.	Driver	Team	Manufacturer	Laps	Miles (km)	Race time	Average speed (mph)	Report	Ref
1960	July 31	22	Fireball Roberts	John Hines	Pontiac	200	300 (482.803)	2:29:47	112.652	Report	
1961	September 17	3	David Pearson	John Masoni	Pontiac	267	400.5 (644.542)	3:11:39	125.384	Report	
1962	October 28	4	Rex White	Rex White	Chevrolet	267	400.5 (644.542)	3:12:24	124.74	Report	
1963	June 30	3	Junior Johnson	Ray Fox	Chevrolet	267	400.5 (644.542)	3:18:42	121.139	Report	
1964	June 7	11	Ned Jarrett	Bondy Long	Ford	267	400.5 (644.542)	3:33:32	112.535	Report	
1965	June 13	21	Marvin Panch	Wood Brothers Racing	Ford	267	400.5 (644.542)	3:38:13	110.12	Report	
1966	August 7	43	Richard Petty	Petty Enterprises	Plymouth	267	400.5 (644.542)	3:04:30	130.244	Report	
1967	August 6	29	Dick Hutcherson	Bondy Long	Ford	334	501 (806.281)	3:47:14	132.286	Report	
1968	August 4	98	LeeRoy Yarbrough	Junior Johnson & Associates	Ford	334	501 (806.281)	3:56:34	127.068	Report	
1969	August 10	98	LeeRoy Yarbrough	Junior Johnson & Associates	Ford	334	501 (806.281)	3:45:35	133.001	Report	
1970	August 2	43	Richard Petty	Petty Enterprises	Plymouth	328	499.216 (803.41)	3:29:53	142.712	Report	
1971	August 1	43	Richard Petty	Petty Enterprises	Plymouth	328	499.216 (803.41)	3:52:05	129.061	Report	
1972	July 23	12	Bobby Allison	Richard Howard	Chevrolet	328	499.216 (803.41)	3:47:08	131.295	Report	
1973	July 22	21	David Pearson	Wood Brothers Racing	Mercury	328	499.216 (803.41)	3:50:01	130.211	Report	
1974	July 28	43	Richard Petty	Petty Enterprises	Dodge	328	499.216 (803.41)	3:42:31	131.651	Report	
1975	November 9	15	Buddy Baker	Bud Moore Engineering	Ford	328	499.216 (803.41)	3:48:40	130.99	Report	
1976	November 7	71	Dave Marcis	Nord Krauskopf	Dodge	328	499.216 (803.41)	3:55:07	127.396	Report	
1977	November 6	88	Darrell Waltrip	DiGard Motorsports	Chevrolet	268*	407.896 (656.444)	3:42:23	110.052	Report	
1978	November 5	1	Donnie Allison	Ellington Racing	Chevrolet	328	499.216 (803.41)	4:00:43	124.312	Report	
1979	November 4	21	Neil Bonnett	Wood Brothers Racing	Mercury	328	499.216 (803.41)	3:33:46	140.12	Report	
1980	November 2	11	Cale Yarborough	Junior Johnson & Associates	Chevrolet	328	499.216 (803.41)	3:48:19	131.19	Report	
1981	November 8	21	Neil Bonnett	Wood Brothers Racing	Ford	328	499.216 (803.41)	3:49:43	130.391	Report	
1982	November 7	88	Bobby Allison	DiGard Motorsports	Buick	328	499.216 (803.41)	3:48:51	130.884	Report	
1983	November 6	75	Neil Bonnett	RahMoc Enterprises	Chevrolet	328	499.216 (803.41)	3:37:37	137.643	Report	
1984	November 11	3	Dale Earnhardt	Richard Childress Racing	Chevrolet	328	499.216 (803.41)	3:42:31	134.61	Report	
1985	November 3	9	Bill Elliott	Melling Racing	Ford	328	499.216 (803.41)	3:34:34	139.597	Report	
1986	November 2	3	Dale Earnhardt	Richard Childress Racing	Chevrolet	328	499.216 (803.41)	3:15:22	152.523	Report	
1987	November 22	9	Bill Elliott	Melling Racing	Ford	328	499.216 (803.41)	3:35:25	139.047	Report	
1988	November 20	27	Rusty Wallace	Blue Max Racing	Pontiac	328	499.216 (803.41)	3:52:09	129.024	Report	
1989	November 19	3	Dale Earnhardt	Richard Childress Racing	Chevrolet	328	499.216 (803.41)	3:33:36	140.229	Report	
1990	November 18	15	Morgan Shepherd	Bud Moore Engineering	Ford	328	499.216 (803.41)	3:32:34	140.911	Report	
1991	November 17	6	Mark Martin	Roush Racing	Ford	328	499.216 (803.41)	3:37:06	137.968	Report	
1992	November 15	11	Bill Elliott	Junior Johnson & Associates	Ford	328	499.216 (803.41)	3:44:20	133.322	Report	
1993	November 14	2	Rusty Wallace	Penske Racing	Pontiac	328	499.216 (803.41)	3:59:12	125.221	Report	
1994	November 13	6	Mark Martin	Roush Racing	Ford	328	499.216 (803.41)	3:21:03	148.982	Report	
1995	November 12	3	Dale Earnhardt	Richard Childress Racing	Chevrolet	328	499.216 (803.41)	3:03:03	163.633	Report	
1996	November 10	18	Bobby Labonte	Joe Gibbs Racing	Chevrolet	328	499.216 (803.41)	3:39:13	134.661	Report	
1997	November 16	18	Bobby Labonte	Joe Gibbs Racing	Pontiac	325	500.5 (805.476)	3:07:48	159.904	Report	
1998	November 8	24	Jeff Gordon	Hendrick Motorsports	Chevrolet	221*	340.34 (547.724)	2:57:42	114.915	Report	
1999	November 21	18	Bobby Labonte	Joe Gibbs Racing	Pontiac	325	500.5 (805.476)	3:37:43	137.932	Report	
2000	November 20*	25	Jerry Nadeau	Hendrick Motorsports	Chevrolet	325	500.5 (805.476)	3:32:32	141.296	Report	
2001	November 18	18	Bobby Labonte	Joe Gibbs Racing	Pontiac	325	500.5 (805.476)	3:17:53	151.756	Report	
2002	October 27	97	Kurt Busch	Roush Racing	Ford	248*	381.92 (614.64)	2:59:42	127.519	Report	
2003	October 26/27*	24	Jeff Gordon	Hendrick Motorsports	Chevrolet	325	500.5 (805.476)	3:55:02	127.769	Report	
2004	October 31	48	Jimmie Johnson	Hendrick Motorsports	Chevrolet	325	500.5 (805.476)	3:25:54	145.847	Report	
2005	October 30	99	Carl Edwards	Roush Racing	Ford	325	500.5 (805.476)	3:24:31	146.834	Report	
2006	October 29	20	Tony Stewart	Joe Gibbs Racing	Chevrolet	325	500.5 (805.476)	3:29:23	143.421	Report	
2007	October 28	48	Jimmie Johnson	Hendrick Motorsports	Chevrolet	329*	506.66 (815.39)	3:44:45	135.26	Report	
2008	October 26	99	Carl Edwards	Roush Fenway Racing	Ford	325	500.5 (805.476)	3:43:39	134.272	Report	
2009	September 6	9	Kasey Kahne	Richard Petty Motorsports	Dodge	325	500.5 (805.476)	3:44:03	134.033	Report	
2010	September 5	14	Tony Stewart	Stewart–Haas Racing	Chevrolet	325	500.5 (805.476)	3:52:43	129.041	Report	
2011	September 6*	24	Jeff Gordon	Hendrick Motorsports	Chevrolet	325	500.5 (805.476)	4:00:58	124.623	Report	
2012	September 2	11	Denny Hamlin	Joe Gibbs Racing	Toyota	327*	503.58 (810.433)	3:32:45	142.02	Report	
2013	September 1	18	Kyle Busch	Joe Gibbs Racing	Toyota	325	500.5 (805.476)	3:42:14	135.128	Report	
2014	August 31	5	Kasey Kahne	Hendrick Motorsports	Chevrolet	335*	515.9 (830.26)	3:55:24	131.512	Report	
2015	March 1	48	Jimmie Johnson	Hendrick Motorsports	Chevrolet	325	500.5 (805.476)	3:49:06	131.078	Report	
2016	February 28	48	Jimmie Johnson	Hendrick Motorsports	Chevrolet	330*	508.2 (817.868)	3:15:38	155.863	Report	
2017	March 5	2	Brad Keselowski	Team Penske	Ford	325	500.5 (805.476)	3:33:08	140.898	Report	
2018	February 25	4	Kevin Harvick	Stewart–Haas Racing	Ford	325	500.5 (805.476)	3:29:54	143.068	Report	
2019	February 24	2	Brad Keselowski	Team Penske	Ford	325	500.5 (805.476)	3:30:33	142.626	Report	
2020	June 7*	4	Kevin Harvick	Stewart–Haas Racing	Ford	325	500.5 (805.476)	3:30:03	142.966	Report	
2021	March 21	12	Ryan Blaney	Team Penske	Ford	325	500.5 (805.476)	3:27:41	144.595	Report	
2022	March 20	24	William Byron	Hendrick Motorsports	Chevrolet	325	500.5 (805.476)	3:57:14	126.584	Report	
2023	March 19	22	Joey Logano	Team Penske	Ford	260	400.4 (644.38)	2:53:05	138.8	Report	
2024	February 25	99	Daniel Suárez	Trackhouse Racing	Chevrolet	260	400.4 (644.38)	3:28:11	115.398	Report	
2025	February 23	20	Christopher Bell	Joe Gibbs Racing	Toyota	266*	409.64 (659.27)	3:27:37	118.384	Report	
2026	February 22	45	Tyler Reddick	23XI Racing	Toyota	271*	417.34 (671.644)	3:32:27	117.865	Report	
2027	February 28									Report	

- 1977 & 2002: Race shortened due to rain
- 1998: Race shortened
- 2000: Race postponed from Sunday to Monday due to rain.
- 2003: Race started on Sunday but was finished on Monday due to rain.
- 2007, 2012, 2014, 2016, 2025, & 2026: Race extended due to a NASCAR Overtime finish.
- 2011: Race delayed from Sunday night to Tuesday morning due to rain.
- 2020: Race postponed from March 15 to June 7 due to the COVID-19 pandemic.

=== Multiple winners (drivers) ===
No. wins	Driver	Years won
4	Richard Petty	1966, 1970–1971, 1974
4	Dale Earnhardt	1984, 1986, 1989, 1995
4	Bobby Labonte	1996–1997, 1999, 2001
4	Jimmie Johnson	2004, 2007, 2015–2016
3	Neil Bonnett	1979, 1981, 1983
3	Bill Elliott	1985, 1987, 1992
3	Jeff Gordon	1998, 2003, 2011
2	LeeRoy Yarbrough	1968–1969
2	David Pearson	1961, 1973
2	Bobby Allison	1972, 1982
2	Rusty Wallace	1988, 1993
2	Mark Martin	1991, 1994
2	Carl Edwards	2005, 2008
2	Tony Stewart	2006, 2010
2	Kasey Kahne	2009, 2014
2	Brad Keselowski	2017, 2019
2	Kevin Harvick	2018, 2020

==== Multiple winners (teams) ====
No. wins	Team	Years won
10	Hendrick Motorsports	1998, 2000, 2003–2004, 2007, 2011, 2014–2016, 2022
8	Joe Gibbs Racing	1996–1997, 1999, 2001, 2006, 2012–2013, 2025
5	Roush Fenway Racing	1991, 1994, 2002, 2005, 2008
5	Team Penske	1993, 2017, 2019, 2021, 2023
4	Wood Brothers Racing	1965, 1973, 1979, 1981
4	Petty Enterprises	1966, 1970–1971, 1974
4	Junior Johnson & Associates	1968–1969, 1980, 1992
4	Richard Childress Racing	1984, 1986, 1989, 1995
3	Stewart–Haas Racing	2010, 2018, 2020
2	Bondy Long	1964, 1967
2	DiGard Motorsports	1977, 1982
2	Melling Racing	1985, 1987

==== Manufacturer wins ====
No. wins	Manufacturer	Years won
25	Chevrolet	1962–1963, 1972, 1977–1978, 1980, 1983–1984, 1986, 1989, 1995–1996, 1998, 2000, 2003–2004, 2006–2007, 2010–2011, 2014–2016, 2022, 2024
22	Ford	1964–1965, 1967–1969, 1975, 1981, 1985, 1987, 1990–1992, 1994, 2002, 2005, 2008, 2017–2021, 2023
7	Pontiac	1960–1961, 1988, 1993, 1997, 1999, 2001
4	Toyota	2012–2013, 2025-2026
3	Plymouth	1966, 1970–1971
3	Dodge	1974, 1976, 2009
2	Mercury	1973, 1979
1	Buick	1982

=== Notable races ===
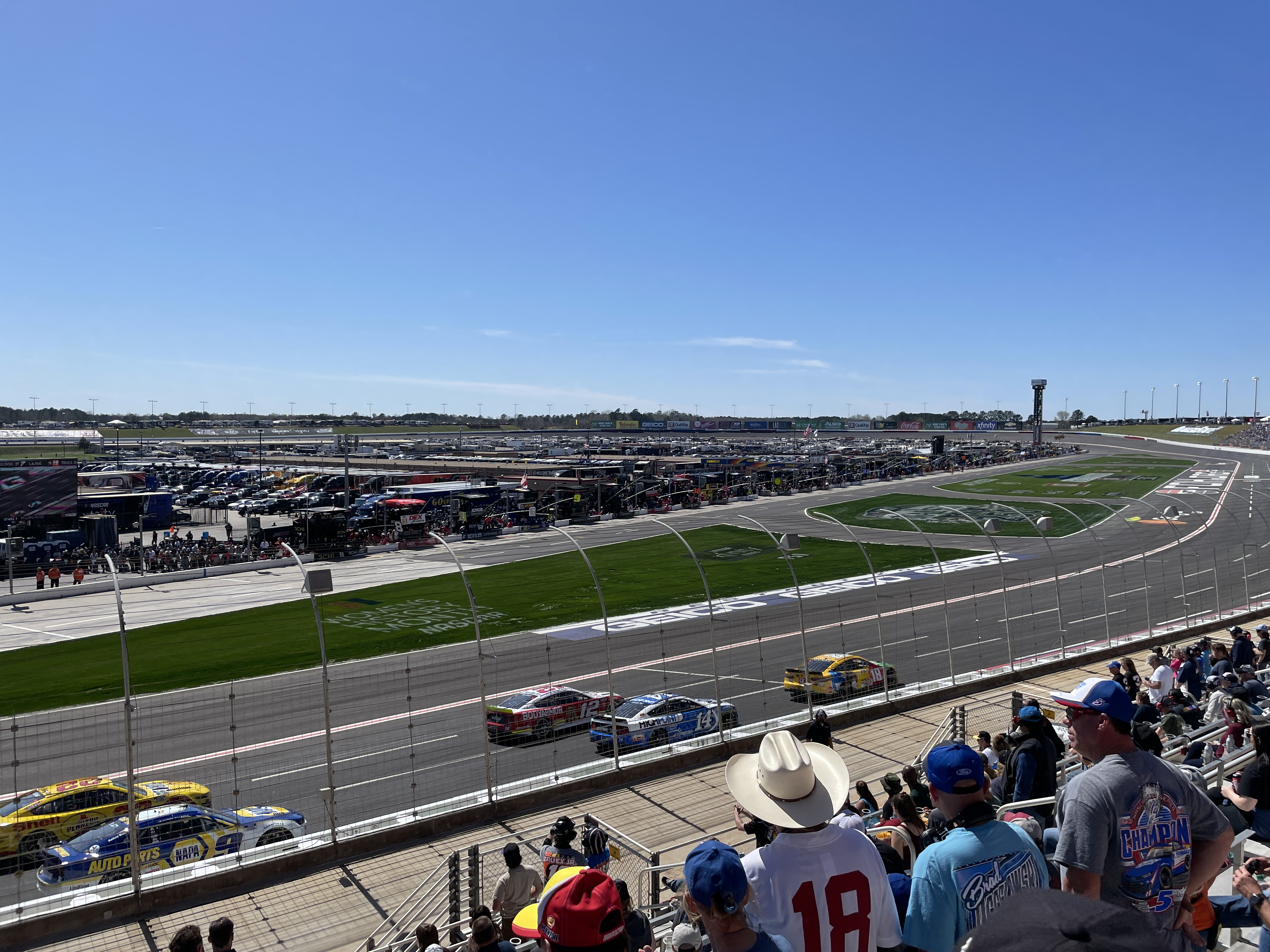
2022 Folds of Honor QuikTrip 500

- 1966: Richard Petty led 90 laps and beat Buddy Baker for his first Atlanta win, but the story of the race centered on pole-sitter Curtis Turner and third-starting Fred Lorenzen. With Ford's participation stopped in a dispute over engine rules, the season had been dominated by Chrysler race cars. Turner entered a Smokey Yunick Chevrolet rumored to be radically altered and not in compliance with the NASCAR rulebook; Lorenzen drove Junior Johnson's Ford, a car nicknamed "The Yellow Banana" because the body had been visibly altered; both cars passed NASCAR inspection where others did not. Turner led 60 laps and finished 24th with distributor failure while Lorenzen led 24 laps and was eliminated in a crash, finishing 23rd.
- 1971: Richard Petty became the first stock car driver to reach $1 million in career earnings after a race-long duel with Bobby Allison.
- 1976: Dave Marcis took his final superspeedway win. Driving Harry Hyde's famous No. 71 Dodge, Marcis engaged in a nose-to-nose battle for most of the first 64 laps with Buddy Baker, Cale Yarborough, and David Pearson. Part-time racer Dale Earnhardt survived a huge crash with some 60 to go when Dick Brooks hit the wall in Three and slid into Earnhardt's path; Earnhardt tumbled to the fourth turn.
- 1977: The race shortened due to rain/darkness. Darrell Waltrip took advantage of the lapped car of James Hylton to storm past Donnie Allison on the last lap; Allison crashed with Cale Yarborough coming to the stripe.
- 1978: A scoring breakdown led to an embarrassing change of the declared winner. Manual scoring ruled that Richard Petty had edged Dave Marcis at the stripe, but a recheck hours later proved that Donnie Allison, who finished two lengths ahead of Petty and Marcis, had indeed won.
- 1979: Neil Bonnett edged Dale Earnhardt, Yarborough, and Bobby Allison in a hot four-car battle over the race's final 20 laps. Following the race, Darrell Waltrip took a two-point lead over Richard Petty entering the season finale in Ontario.
- 1980: A multi-car wreck in the first 20 laps eliminated the Allison brothers and other contenders, leaving Cale Yarborough to breeze all but uncontested to the win; the win helped him close to within 29 points of leader Dale Earnhardt with one race left in the 1980 title chase.
- 1981: ESPN televised the race live, the first such telecast for the third-year cable network. The race turned into a spirited affair as Neil Bonnett and Richard Petty fought back and forth for the lead amid bids by Darrell Waltrip, Joe Ruttman, and Harry Gant. The final two laps were a fierce duel won by Bonnett over Waltrip and Cale Yarborough.
- 1982: The race set a track record for lead changes at 45, among 14 drivers. Blistered tires ruined a victory bid by Richard Petty as Bobby Allison outdueled Darrell Waltrip and Harry Gant for the win. This would be the final start for Country music singer Marty Robbins, who would die in December of that year.
- 1984: Driver Terry Schoonover was killed in the race after crashing into the barrier in turn two.
- 1986: Dale Earnhardt wrapped up his second career title by completely dominating the Dixie 500. The rest of the top five was a list of NASCAR luminaries – Richard Petty, Bill Elliott, Tim Richmond, and Buddy Baker.
- 1987: For the first time, this race was scheduled as the final race of the NASCAR season.
- 1989: In this race, independent driver Grant Adcox was killed in a crash.
- 1990: With cars packed tightly together for late-race pit stops under yellow (the result of NASCAR's rule closing pit road when the yellow comes out instead of letting cars pit before taking the yellow), one of Bill Elliott's crew members was killed when Ricky Rudd was coming into the pits for service and lost control of his car. This led to NASCAR mandating a speed limit on pit road for crew member's safety.
- 1992: Widely considered one of the most dramatic NASCAR races of all time. See 1992 Hooters 500
- 1993: Race winner Rusty Wallace and Winston Cup champion Dale Earnhardt circled the track in a Polish Victory Lap, carrying No. 7 and No. 28 flags to honor Alan Kulwicki and Davey Allison who were both killed in aviation accidents during the season. Both Kulwicki and Allison were key fixtures exactly one year earlier at the classic 1992 race.
- 1995: Jeff Gordon wrapped up his first series title as Dale Earnhardt drove his No. 3 to victory at the race time of 3 hours, 3 minutes, and 3 seconds. Jeff Gordon became the youngest champion of NASCAR's Modern Era at 24 years, 3 months, and 3 days old. Dale Earnhardt scored his 7th win at Atlanta, tying Cale Yarborough as the all-time winningest driver at Atlanta Motor Speedway.
- 1996: Bobby Labonte took the win, the first for Joe Gibbs Racing building its own engines after four seasons running Rick Hendrick engines. Terry Labonte clinched the 1996 Winston Cup Championship driving for Hendrick Motorsports. The two made a victory lap together and celebrated together in victory lane.
- 1997: 325 laps / 500.5 miles with new configuration. Bobby Labonte won in JGR's first win with Pontiac; Pontiacs dominated the top ten at the finish
- 1998: Race shortened due to rain and darkness. Rain delays throughout the day made the race go into midnight, and track officials wanted the fans to get home at a decent hour. First night Cup race.
- 2000: Race postponed from Sunday to Monday due to rain. Final career start for Darrell Waltrip. It would be the final time the event would be the last race of the NASCAR season.
- 2001: Was scheduled to be the final race of the 2001 season, but Loudon was moved to the weekend after due to 9/11. That instead made this the second-to-last race of the season.
- 2002: Race shortened due to rain. Moved from November to October, such that the race will no longer be the final race of the NASCAR season.
- 2009: Race moved from October to Labor Day weekend, marking the first regularly scheduled NASCAR Cup Series race at Atlanta to start at night. Kasey Kahne took the win, the second of the year for the team now under the aegis of Richard Petty Motorsports.
- 2011: Race postponed from Sunday night to Tuesday afternoon due to rain. Jeff Gordon scored his 85th career win after a fierce duel with teammate Jimmie Johnson over the final ten laps on worn tires, giving him sole possession of third on the all-time wins list and the most wins by a driver in NASCAR Modern Era (1972–present). This was only the second time in NASCAR's Modern Era that a race was postponed to a Tuesday, the other time coming in August 2007 at Michigan (also for rain). Gordon was honored by NASCAR president Mike Helton with a framed portrait of photos from past victories by Jeff made into the shape of the No. 85 to commemorate the milestone victory.
- 2015: The start of the race was delayed nearly an hour due to rain. Once the race began there were two wrecks, one with 69 laps to go where two cars were involved, and another wreck with 21 laps to go. Six cars were involved in the second incident, which brought a nine-minute, one-second red flag to facilitate cleanup on the track. Jimmie Johnson scored his first win of the season.
- 2016: Johnson repeated as race winner and tied Dale Earnhardt with 76 career Cup wins. Matt Kenseth was black flagged on a green flag stop when a crewman left a wedge wrench on the rear deck and another crewman picked it up for use on the car; a communication breakdown meant Kenseth stayed on the racetrack for five laps and was not scored for one of those laps.
- 2017: 2500th Monster Energy NASCAR Cup Series race. Kevin Harvick led 292 of the 325 laps and looked to be on his way to his second win at Atlanta until a caution came out for Austin Dillon's stalled car. When they came down pit road under caution, Harvick got caught speeding exiting sending him to the rear of the field. Kyle Larson found himself on his way to the win, until with seven laps to go left the door open as if he were oblivious, allowing Brad Keselowski to pass him and ultimately win. It was also the first time the stage racing format was used at Atlanta, where stages 1 and 2 were 85 laps long each, and stage 3 comprising the final 155 laps of the event. Last race on the original pavement laid down when the track was reconfigured in 1997, but voices from fans and drivers are calling for them not to repave the surface, even though several drivers saw tires fail during the race.
- 2022: The 2022 race marked the first event to be held on the track after it was repaved and reprofiled with steeper turns and a narrower racing surface, with a new rules package to emulate superspeedway racing like that seen at Daytona and Talladega. The event set a then-track record for lead changes, with 46 lead changes among 20 leaders. William Byron took his third career Cup victory after dominating the closing portion of the race.
- 2024: Daniel Suárez scored his 2nd career NCS victory in a three-wide photo finish with Ryan Blaney and Kyle Busch. The margin of victory was 0.003 seconds between Suárez and Blaney, and 0.007 seconds between Suárez and Busch. This was the third-closest finish in NASCAR Cup Series history, behind the 2003 Carolina Dodge Dealers 400 at Darlington and the 2011 Aaron's 499 at Talladega (both races were won by 0.002 seconds). The race broke the 2022 race's of lead changes, with 48 lead changes among 14 drivers.

== Summer race ==
Dollar Tree 400
- Corporate sponsor: Dollar Tree
- First race: 1960
- Distance: 400.4 mi (644.244 km)
- Laps: 260; Stage 1: 60; Final 2 stages: 100 each
- Previous names: Atlanta 500 (1960–1980); Coca-Cola 500 (1981–1985); Motorcraft 500 (1986); Motorcraft Quality Parts 500 (1987–1993); Purolator 500 (1994–1996); Primestar 500 (1997–1998); Cracker Barrel 500 (1999); Cracker Barrel Old Country Store 500 (2000–2001); MBNA America 500 (2002); Bass Pro Shops MBNA 500 (2003); Golden Corral 500 (2004–2006); Kobalt Tools 500 (2007–2010); Quaker State 400 (2021–2026)

The Dollar Tree 400 is the current name for the summer race. Ryan Blaney is the defending race winner, having won it in 2026.

=== History ===
From 1960 to 2010 and as a July race since 2021. The race is one of two races currently held at the Atlanta track every season, with the Autotrader 400 being the other and run at various times (originally November, later October and currently the second race of the season as of 2024).

The race was originally 500.5 miles (805.5 km) on the 1.54-mile quad-oval (325 laps). In August 2010, Atlanta Motor Speedway announced that they would no longer run this spring race, instead choosing to focus on the Labor Day weekend race at the track beginning in 2011. The end of the Atlanta 500 was followed by the addition of a race at Kentucky Speedway starting in 2011, primarily due to litigation by Kentucky's former owners and a settlement of that trial.

On September 30, 2020, Speedway Motorsports announced Kentucky would lose its Cup race and the event be moved back to Atlanta, to be held July 11, 2021. The race would be 260 laps (400.4 miles), owing to Shell's prior sponsorship agreements and the first since 1966 to be held at the track at 400.4 miles (644.4 km). The event was held under the lights in 2023, the opening race of the playoffs race in 2024. The 2025 event marked the opening round of the inaugural NASCAR In-Season Challenge, as well as a return to a night race ran on a Saturday night. In 2026, the race would retain it's night race, but moved to Sunday night.

On June 12, 2026, it was announced that Dollar Tree would replace Quaker State as the title sponsor in 2027.

=== Notable races ===
- 1960: The first race at Atlanta International Raceway (now Atlanta Motor Speedway) was won by Bobby Johns in a 1960 Pontiac.
- 1961: Bob Burdick led 44 laps to his only career Grand National win. Pole sitter Marvin Panch led 127 laps but faded to sixth, while Fred Lorenzen led 87 laps but fell out with engine failure. Rookie Bobby Allison finished 37th.
- 1964: Fred Lorenzen led the last 168 laps and 206 in all, en route to a two-lap win amid an epidemic of tire failures and resultant crashes; Paul Goldsmith led the first 54 laps but blew a tire, smashed the guardrail, and flipped over.
- 1966: Jim Hurtubise led the final 58 laps in his only career Grand National win.
- 1971: A. J. Foyt outdueled Richard Petty for his fifth career win.
- 1972: Bobby Allison posted the first win for Chevrolet on a superspeedway since the 1960s, as he held off a strong challenge from A. J. Foyt and Bobby Isaac.
- 1974: Cale Yarborough grabbed the lead when David Pearson pitted under green and was trapped by an ill-timed yellow; the race was shortened to 450 miles (720 km) due to the energy crisis.
- 1975: After winning the Dixie 500 four times, Richard Petty edged Buddy Baker for his first Atlanta 500 win.
- 1976: David Pearson lost a lap early and spent 225 laps getting it back before winning. Cale Yarborough lost four laps on a green-flag stop and got three of them back to finish third.
- 1977: Richard Petty, David Pearson, and Cale Yarborough finished 1–2–3 as they combined to lead all 328 laps. Yarborough finished third after his brakes wore out and at times he had to be stopped by Richard Childress' car on pit road. Only two yellows flew.
- 1979: Buddy Baker caught a late yellow, got four tires, and won in a late sprint, his first win since 1976.
- 1980: Sophomore Dale Earnhardt took the lead with 30 to go after Cale Yarborough broke while chasing down Bobby Allison. USAC stock car racer Rusty Wallace finished second. Donnie Allison crashed out of the lead with sophomore Terry Labonte in what became his final race for car owner Hoss Ellington.
- 1981: Cale Yarborough posted his first win for car owner M.C. Anderson, but the story of the race was a loud protest by Bobby Allison over a NASCAR-mandated reduction of the spoiler of his 1981 Pontiac LeMans to reduce the car's aerodynamic efficiency. Car owner Harry Ranier threatened to boycott the race but got no support in the garage area and relented to the rule change.
- 1982: After Dale Earnhardt fell out, rain hit the race and Darrell Waltrip edged Richard Petty to the race-ending yellow.
- 1983: Cale Yarborough drove a backup car to victory for the second time in 1983. He'd wrecked his primary Ranier Chevy a week earlier in Rockingham and used a car that had been a show car. It was also the second time he won on his birthday.
- 1984: Benny Parsons posted his final career win.
- 1986: Morgan Shepherd outran Dale Earnhardt for his first win in five years and the first of three wins at Atlanta.
- 1987: Dale Earnhardt fell out late and Ricky Rudd edged Benny Parsons and Rusty Wallace for his first win on an oval longer than a mile.
- 1989: Darrell Waltrip came back from nearly a lap down to win. During a mid-race caution, Waltrip was slowed by the pace car picking up the wrong leader during pitstops and was trapped barely on the lead lap. The mishap led to the implementation of the rule closing pit road when the yellow comes out; the rule was designed to stop cars from pitting before taking the yellow, which was blamed for scoring mistakes in the days of manual lap scoring. Also, during this race, Richard Petty's car caught fire during a pit stop, injuring his gasman and leaving Jerry Punch some singed hairs (after this, pit reporters are required to wear fire suits).
- 1992: Bill Elliott won in unlikely fashion as a caution trapped the entire field behind him a lap down during green flag stops in the final 30 laps.
- 1993: A major snowstorm, Superstorm 93, caused the race (scheduled for March 14) to be rescheduled for March 20, with Morgan Shepherd taking the win.
- 1995: Jeff Gordon posted his second win of 1995 on his way to his first championship title.
- 1996: Dale Earnhardt scored his 70th career NASCAR Cup Series win in this race. Earnhardt collected his 8th Atlanta win, passing Cale Yarborough as the all-time winningest driver at Atlanta Motor Speedway. This would be Earnhardt's last points victory until the 1998 Daytona 500.
- 1997: Dale Jarrett dominated in a race where Steve Grissom tore open a concrete wall and flipped over. His fuel cell hit the wall and erupted in flame.
- 1998: Bobby Labonte took the win in a race delayed to Monday by rain and in a weekend that saw numerous driver injuries, notably Mike Skinner and Derrike Cope.
- 2000: Dale Earnhardt won in a thrilling side-by-side finish, edging out Bobby Labonte by inches. Earnhardt scored his 75th career NASCAR Cup Series win, extending his record at the time as the 6th winningest driver in NASCAR History (currently 8th All-Time). This would be Dale Earnhardt's 9th and final victory at Atlanta Motor Speedway, extending his record as the all-time winningest driver of the racetrack. His record of 9 wins still stands today. This would also be Earnhardt's only win on the 1.54 mile quad-oval configuration. Mike Skinner, Dale Earnhardt's teammate of Richard Childress Racing, had dominated the race by leading 191 of the 325 laps. His engine however blew up with 19 laps to go, allowing Earnhardt to win this race.
- 2001: Kevin Harvick edged Gordon by inches in his first win for RCR after Earnhardt's death. Although the car had been assigned a new number, Harvick used the same car and team Earnhardt won with the previous year. Prior to Earnhardt's death, this race had already been intended to be Harvick's Cup series debut. He was originally scheduled to run 7 races in 2001, and move to full-time in 2002; but he would go on to race the remainder of the season for the team.
- 2002: Tony Stewart posted his first 500-mile (800 km) win.
- 2005: Carl Edwards slithered past Jimmie Johnson on the final lap to score his first career win, completing a sweep of the weekend at Atlanta.
- 2006: Bill Lester becomes the first African-American driver to race in a Cup series event since Willy T. Ribbs in 1986. Kasey Kahne would win this race, which became the first of his six wins that year.
- 2007: It was the last race that the fourth generation car was run consecutively. The fifth generation Car of Tomorrow would debut the following week at Bristol. Additionally, Mark Martin would close a 621-race Cup series consecutive start streak, reaching back to 1988.
- 2008: Kyle Busch won, giving Toyota their first win in the Cup series. It was the first for a foreign automaker since Jaguar in 1954. It was also Busch's first win under the Joe Gibbs Racing banner.
- 2009: Kurt Busch dominated the race after a pit crew mistake by one of Marcos Ambrose's crewman trapped most of the cars that could challenge him a lap down.
- 2010: A scary flight by Brad Keselowski was a top story; he was spun out by the lapped car of Carl Edwards and nearly struck the fencing past the start-finish line in the final laps. This was also the last spring race at Atlanta until the track's surviving summer-autumn race was moved to March in 2015.
- 2021: In what was the final Cup Series race at Atlanta prior to its superspeedway reconfiguration, Kurt Busch fended off younger brother Kyle Busch and won the race. This was Kurt's final win with Chip Ganassi Racing and the penultimate win of his career.
- 2022: Chase Elliott finally earned his first Cup Series win at Atlanta, which is considered his home track. However, it was not without slight controversy; Corey LaJoie, who had finished a career-best 5th at Atlanta in the spring, was looking to earn his first Cup Series victory. As LaJoie attempted to pass Elliott, he slid up the track, squeezing LaJoie into the wall.

=== Past winners ===
Year	Date	No.	Driver	Team	Manufacturer	Race distance		Race time	Average speed (mph)	Report	Ref
Year	Date	No.	Driver	Team	Manufacturer	Laps	Miles (km)	Race time	Average speed (mph)	Report	Ref
1960	October 30	5	Bobby Johns	Cotton Owens	Pontiac	334	501 (806.281)	4:36:44	108.408	Report	
1961	March 26	53	Bob Burdick	Roy Burdick	Pontiac	334	501 (806.281)	4:02:05	124.172	Report	
1962	June 10	28	Fred Lorenzen	Holman-Moody	Ford	219*	328.5 (528.669)	3:13:16	101.983	Report	
1963	March 17	28	Fred Lorenzen	Holman-Moody	Ford	334	501 (806.281)	3:50:12	130.582	Report	
1964	April 5	28	Fred Lorenzen	Holman-Moody	Ford	334	501 (806.281)	3:46:05	134.137	Report	
1965	April 11	21	Marvin Panch	Wood Brothers Racing	Ford	334	501 (806.281)	3:52:17	129.41	Report	
1966	March 27	56	Jim Hurtubise	Norm Nelson	Plymouth	334	501 (806.281)	3:49:02	131.247	Report	
1967	April 2	21	Cale Yarborough	Wood Brothers Racing	Ford	334	501 (806.281)	3:49:03	131.238	Report	
1968	March 31	21	Cale Yarborough	Wood Brothers Racing	Mercury	334	501 (806.281)	3:59:24	125.564	Report	
1969	March 30	21	Cale Yarborough	Wood Brothers Racing	Mercury	334	501 (806.281)	3:46:10	132.191	Report	
1970	March 29	22	Bobby Allison	Mario Rossi	Dodge	328	499.216 (803.41)	3:34:38	139.554	Report	
1971	April 4	21	A. J. Foyt	Wood Brothers Racing	Mercury	328	499.216 (803.41)	3:42:16	131.375	Report	
1972	March 26	12	Bobby Allison	Richard Howard	Chevrolet	328	499.216 (803.41)	3:53:37	128.214	Report	
1973	April 1	21	David Pearson	Wood Brothers Racing	Mercury	328	499.216 (803.41)	3:34:52	139.351	Report	
1974	March 24	11	Cale Yarborough	Richard Howard	Chevrolet	296*	450.512 (725.028)	3:01:26	136.91	Report	
1975	March 23	43	Richard Petty	Petty Enterprises	Dodge	328	499.216 (803.41)	3:44:06	133.496	Report	
1976	March 21	21	David Pearson	Wood Brothers Racing	Mercury	328	499.216 (803.41)	3:52:16	128.904	Report	
1977	March 20	43	Richard Petty	Petty Enterprises	Dodge	328	499.216 (803.41)	3:27:51	144.093	Report	
1978	March 19	15	Bobby Allison	Bud Moore Engineering	Ford	328	499.216 (803.41)	3:30:10	142.52	Report	
1979	March 18	28	Buddy Baker	Ranier-Lundy	Oldsmobile	328	499.216 (803.41)	3:41:47	135.136	Report	
1980	March 16	2	Dale Earnhardt	Rod Osterlund Racing	Chevrolet	328	499.216 (803.41)	3:42:32	134.808	Report	
1981	March 15	27	Cale Yarborough	M.C. Anderson Racing	Buick	328	499.216 (803.41)	3:44:10	133.619	Report	
1982	March 21	11	Darrell Waltrip	Junior Johnson & Associates	Buick	287*	436.82 (702.993)	3:29:58	124.824	Report	
1983	March 27	28	Cale Yarborough	Ranier-Lundy	Chevrolet	328	499.216 (803.41)	4:01:27	124.055	Report	
1984	March 18	55	Benny Parsons	Johnny Hayes	Chevrolet	328	499.216 (803.41)	3:26:39	144.945	Report	
1985	March 17	9	Bill Elliott	Melling Racing	Ford	328	499.216 (803.41)	3:33:32	140.273	Report	
1986	March 16	47	Morgan Shepherd	Race Hill Farm Team	Buick	328	499.216 (803.41)	3:46:41	132.126	Report	
1987	March 15	15	Ricky Rudd	Bud Moore Engineering	Ford	328	499.216 (803.41)	3:44:02	133.689	Report	
1988	March 20	3	Dale Earnhardt	Richard Childress Racing	Chevrolet	328	499.216 (803.41)	3:37:42	137.588	Report	
1989	March 19	17	Darrell Waltrip	Hendrick Motorsports	Chevrolet	328	499.216 (803.41)	3:34:26	139.684	Report	
1990	March 18	3	Dale Earnhardt	Richard Childress Racing	Chevrolet	328	499.216 (803.41)	3:10:58	156.849	Report	
1991	March 17/18*	25	Ken Schrader	Hendrick Motorsports	Chevrolet	328	499.216 (803.41)	3:33:14	140.47	Report	
1992	March 15	11	Bill Elliott	Junior Johnson & Associates	Ford	328	499.216 (803.41)	3:22:44	147.746	Report	
1993	March 20*	21	Morgan Shepherd	Wood Brothers Racing	Ford	328	499.216 (803.41)	3:17:26	150.442	Report	
1994	March 13	28	Ernie Irvan	Robert Yates Racing	Ford	328	499.216 (803.41)	3:24:58	146.136	Report	
1995	March 12	24	Jeff Gordon	Hendrick Motorsports	Chevrolet	328	499.216 (803.41)	3:19:32	150.115	Report	
1996	March 10	3	Dale Earnhardt	Richard Childress Racing	Chevrolet	328	499.216 (803.41)	3:05:42	161.298	Report	
1997*	March 9	88	Dale Jarrett	Robert Yates Racing	Ford	328	499.216 (803.41)	3:45:40	132.731	Report	
1998	March 9*	18	Bobby Labonte	Joe Gibbs Racing	Pontiac	325	500.5 (805.476)	3:35:16	139.501	Report	
1999	March 14	24	Jeff Gordon	Hendrick Motorsports	Chevrolet	325	500.5 (805.476)	3:29:35	143.284	Report	
2000	March 12	3	Dale Earnhardt	Richard Childress Racing	Chevrolet	325	500.5 (805.476)	3:47:55	131.759	Report	
2001	March 11	29	Kevin Harvick	Richard Childress Racing	Chevrolet	325	500.5 (805.476)	3:29:36	143.273	Report	
2002	March 10	20	Tony Stewart	Joe Gibbs Racing	Pontiac	325	500.5 (805.476)	3:22:18	148.443	Report	
2003	March 9	18	Bobby Labonte	Joe Gibbs Racing	Chevrolet	325	500.5 (805.476)	3:25:37	146.048	Report	
2004	March 14	8	Dale Earnhardt Jr.	Dale Earnhardt, Inc.	Chevrolet	325	500.5 (805.476)	3:09:15	158.679	Report	
2005	March 20	99	Carl Edwards	Roush Racing	Ford	325	500.5 (805.476)	3:29:18	143.478	Report	
2006	March 20*	9	Kasey Kahne	Evernham Motorsports	Dodge	325	500.5 (805.476)	3:28:24	144.098	Report	
2007	March 18	48	Jimmie Johnson	Hendrick Motorsports	Chevrolet	325	500.5 (805.476)	3:16:23	152.915	Report	
2008	March 9	18	Kyle Busch	Joe Gibbs Racing	Toyota	325	500.5 (805.476)	3:33:01	140.975	Report	
2009	March 8	2	Kurt Busch	Penske Racing	Dodge	330*	508.2 (817.868)	3:59:01	127.573	Report	
2010	March 7	2	Kurt Busch	Penske Racing	Dodge	341*	525.14 (845.13)	3:59:59	131.294	Report	
2011 – 2020	Not held										
2021	July 11	1	Kurt Busch	Chip Ganassi Racing	Chevrolet	260	400.4 (640.6)	2:50:08	141.207	Report	
2022	July 10	9	Chase Elliott	Hendrick Motorsports	Chevrolet	260	400.4 (640.6)	3:22:18	118.754	Report	
2023	July 9	24	William Byron	Hendrick Motorsports	Chevrolet	185*	284.9 (458.5)	2:24:17	118.475	Report	
2024	September 8	22	Joey Logano	Team Penske	Ford	266*	409.64 (655.383)	3:06:11	134.450	Report	
2025	June 28	9	Chase Elliott	Hendrick Motorsports	Chevrolet	260	400.4 (640.6)	3:34:54	111.792	Report	
2026	July 12–13*	12	Ryan Blaney	Team Penske	Ford	263*	405.02 (651.835)	3:14:25	124.995	Report	
2027	July 18									Report	

- 1962, 1982, & 2023: Race shortened due to rain.
- 1974: Race shortened due to energy crisis.
- 1983: Yarborough won on his birthday for the second time.
- 1991 & 2026: Race started on Sunday but was finished on Monday due to rain.
- 1993: Race postponed one week due to snow from Blizzard of '93.
- 1997: Last race on Atlanta's original configuration.
- 1998 & 2006: Race postponed from Sunday to Monday due to rain.
- 2009, 2010, 2024 & 2026: Race extended due to a green–white–checkered finish. 2010 took 2 overtime attempts.

==== Multiple winners (drivers) ====
# wins	Driver	Years won
6	Cale Yarborough	1967–1969, 1974, 1981, 1983
5	Dale Earnhardt	1980, 1988, 1990, 1996, 2000
4	Bill Elliott	1985 (twice), 1992 (twice)
3	Fred Lorenzen	1962–1964
3	Bobby Allison	1970, 1972, 1978
3	Kurt Busch	2009–2010, 2021
2	David Pearson	1973, 1976
2	Richard Petty	1975, 1977
2	Darrell Waltrip	1982, 1989
2	Morgan Shepherd	1986, 1993
2	Jeff Gordon	1995, 1999
2	Bobby Labonte	1998, 2003
2	Chase Elliott	2022, 2025

==== Multiple winners (teams) ====
# wins	Team	Years
8	Wood Brothers Racing	1965, 1967–1969, 1971, 1973, 1976, 1993
8	Hendrick Motorsports	1989, 1991, 1995, 1999, 2007, 2022, 2023, 2025
5	Richard Childress Racing	1988, 1990, 1996, 2000, 2001
5	Joe Gibbs Racing	1998, 2002, 2003, 2008, 2009
4	Team Penske	2009, 2010, 2024, 2026
3	Holman-Moody	1962–1964
2	Richard Howard	1972, 1974
2	Petty Enterprises	1975, 1977
2	Ranier-Lundy	1979, 1983
2	Junior Johnson & Associates	1982, 1992
2	Robert Yates Racing	1994, 1997

==== Manufacturers wins ====
# wins	Manufacturer	Years won
21	Chevrolet	1972, 1974, 1980, 1983–1984, 1988–1991, 1995–1996, 1999–2001, 2003–2004, 2007, 2021–2023, 2025
15	Ford	1962–1965, 1967, 1978, 1985, 1987, 1992–1994, 1997, 2005, 2024, 2026
6	Dodge	1970, 1975, 1977, 2006, 2009–2010
5	Mercury	1968–1969, 1971, 1973, 1976
4	Pontiac	1960–1961, 1998, 2002
3	Buick	1981–1982, 1986
1	Plymouth	1966
1	Oldsmobile	1979
1	Toyota	2008

Previous race: Daytona 500	NASCAR Cup Series; Autotrader 400	Next race: DuraMAX Texas Grand Prix

Previous race: Toyota/Save Mart 350	NASCAR Cup Series; Dollar Tree 400	Next race: Brickyard 400
