= Folds of Honor =

American nonprofit organization

- Founded: 2007
- Founder: Lt. Col. Dan Rooney
- Type: Nonprofit organization
- Tax ID no.: 75-3240683
- Purpose: Educational scholarships for families of fallen or disabled military members and first responders
- Headquarters: United States
- Region served: United States
- Website: foldsofhonor.org

Folds of Honor is an American nonprofit organization that provides educational scholarships to the spouses and children of fallen or disabled military service members and first responders. Founded in 2007 by United States Air Force lieutenant colonel Dan Rooney, the organization supports families affected by military service and public safety duty through financial assistance for education.

Folds of Honor has awarded 73,000 scholarships totaling over $43 million as of 2026.

== History ==
Folds of Honor was established in 2007 by Lt. Col. Dan Rooney, a U.S. Air Force F16 fighter pilot and PGA professional who currently serves as Commander of Recruiting for the Oklahoma Air Guard, following his experience witnessing the return of a fallen service member and the impact on the family. The organization was created to provide educational support to military families affected by service-related death or disability.

In 2022 the nonprofit began expanding its mission to include scholarships for families of first responders, including police officers, firefighters, and emergency medical personnel.

== Programs ==
Folds of Honor provides educational scholarships that may be used for private school tuition, tutoring, and higher education expenses. The organization awards scholarships annually based on financial need and eligibility criteria tied to military or first responder service.

The nonprofit is also associated with "Patriot Golf Day," a fundraising initiative supported by the golf industry to raise money for scholarships.

== Partnerships and fundraising ==
Folds of Honor partners with a wide range of corporations, sports organizations, and community groups to fund its programs. Corporate partners have included Delta Air Lines, which has contributed financial support and volunteer hours, and Anheuser-Busch, whose Bud Light brand has funded scholarship initiatives.

The organization has also collaborated with sports leagues and events, including Major League Baseball's Memorial Day activities honoring military families. Partnerships extend to golf organizations such as the PGA of America. A number of golf courses have held Folds of Honor golf events, including La Quinta Country Club, Toscana Country Club, Westin Mission Hills Resort, Eagle Falls Golf Course, and Tahquitz Creek Golf Resort.

Folds of Honor had a long-term partnership with QuikTrip to sponsor NASCAR Cup Series races at the Atlanta Motor Speedway from 2015 to 2022.

Additional support comes from national and local businesses, nonprofit organizations, and individual donors.

In 2024, Folds of Honor had a total revenue of $72,850,823 and after expenses had a net income of $2,752,041.

== Impact and recognition ==
Folds of Honor reports that it has distributed tens of thousands of scholarships since its founding, with 43% benefiting minority recipients and 57% are female recipients. The organization has been recognized for its philanthropic efforts and community engagement through partnerships and fundraising initiatives.

It has received a four-star rating from Charity Navigator, indicating high performance in accountability and financial management.

In 2018, John Rich, of the country band, Big & Rich, announced on the Today show that he and his brand, Redneck Riviera, had begun supporting Folds of Honor.

== See also ==
- 2015 Folds of Honor QuikTrip 500
- 2016 Folds of Honor QuikTrip 500
- 2017 Folds of Honor QuikTrip 500
- 2018 Folds of Honor QuikTrip 500
- 2019 Folds of Honor QuikTrip 500
- 2020 Folds of Honor QuikTrip 500
- 2021 Folds of Honor QuikTrip 500
- 2022 Folds of Honor QuikTrip 500
