= Joey Logano =

American racing driver (born 1990)

- Logano at Las Vegas Motor Speedway in 2026
- Born: Joseph Thomas Logano; May 24, 1990 (age 36); Middletown, Connecticut, U.S.
- Height: 6 ft 2 in (1.88 m)
- Weight: 180 lb (82 kg)
- Achievements: 2018, 2022, 2024 NASCAR Cup Series Champion; 2007 NASCAR Busch East Series Champion; 2015 Daytona 500 Winner; 2024 Daytona 500 pole-winner 2016, 2024 NASCAR All-Star Race Winner; 2017, 2022 Busch Light Clash Winner; 2019, 2020, 2023, 2026 America 250 Florida Duel at Daytona Winner; Records; Youngest NASCAR Xfinity Series Race Winner 18 years, 21 days Youngest Sprint Cup Series race Winner 19 years, 35 days Won all three races in the 2015 Chase for the Cup Round of 12 (Charlotte, Kansas, Talladega) (only driver to have "swept" a full round of races in the Playoffs)
- Awards: 2009 Sprint Cup Series Rookie of the Year; Named one of NASCAR's 75 Greatest Drivers (2023)

NASCAR Cup Series career
- 650 races run over 19 years
- Car no., team: No. 22 (Team Penske)
- 2026 position: 7th
- Best finish: 1st (2018, 2022, 2024)
- First race: 2008 Sylvania 300 (New Hampshire)
- Last race: 2026 Season Finale 400 (Homestead)
- First win: 2009 Lenox Industrial Tools 301 (New Hampshire)
- Last win: 2026 Bass Pro Shops Night Race (Bristol)
Wins	Top tens	Poles
40	315	35

NASCAR O'Reilly Auto Parts Series career
- 179 races run over 13 years
- 2024 position: 90th
- Best finish: 8th (2010)
- First race: 2008 Heluva Good! 200 (Dover)
- Last race: 2024 Mission 200 at The Glen (Watkins Glen)
- First win: 2008 Meijer 300 (Kentucky)
- Last win: 2018 Zippo 200 at The Glen (Watkins Glen)
Wins	Top tens	Poles
30	145	36

NASCAR FedEx Freight Truck Series career
- 9 races run over 6 years
- 2023 position: 85th
- Best finish: 83rd (2015)
- First race: 2008 Mountain Dew 250 (Talladega)
- Last race: 2023 Weather Guard Truck Race on Dirt (Bristol Dirt)
- First win: 2015 Kroger 250 (Martinsville)
- Last win: 2023 Weather Guard Truck Race on Dirt (Bristol Dirt)
Wins	Top tens	Poles
2	6	2

ARCA Menards Series career
- 4 races run over 2 years
- Best finish: 56th (2008)
- First race: 2008 Carolina 500 (Rockingham)
- Last race: 2009 Pocono ARCA 200 (Pocono)
- First win: 2008 Carolina 500 (Rockingham)
- Last win: 2009 Pocono ARCA 200 (Pocono)
Wins	Top tens	Poles
2	4	1

ARCA Menards Series East career
- 13 races run over 1 year
- Best finish: 1st (2007)
- First race: 2007 Greased Lightning 150 (Greenville-Pickens)
- Last race: 2007 Sunoco 150 (Dover)
- First win: 2007 Greased Lightning 150 (Greenville-Pickens)
- Last win: 2007 Aubuchon Hardware 125 presented by Hardwarestore.com (New Hampshire)
Wins	Top tens	Poles
5	10	3

ARCA Menards Series West career
- 4 races run over 3 years
- Best finish: 38th (2007)
- First race: 2007 AlphaTrade.com 150 (Phoenix)
- Last race: 2011 Thunder Valley Casino Resort 200 (Sonoma)
- First win: 2007 AlphaTrade.com 150 (Phoenix)
- Last win: 2011 Thunder Valley Casino Resort 200 (Sonoma)
Wins	Top tens	Poles
2	2	0
- Statistics up to date as of November 8, 2026.

Joseph Thomas Logano (born May 24, 1990) is an American professional stock car racing driver. He competes full-time in the NASCAR Cup Series, driving the No. 22 Ford Mustang Dark Horse for Team Penske. He has previously competed in the NASCAR Xfinity Series, the NASCAR Craftsman Truck Series, as well as what is now the ARCA Menards Series, ARCA Menards Series East, and ARCA Menards Series West.

Logano is the 2018, 2022, and 2024 NASCAR Cup Series champion. He previously drove the No. 20 Toyota Camry for Joe Gibbs Racing from 2009 to 2012, scoring two wins, 16 top-five finishes, and 41 top-ten finishes. He also competed in the No. 02 Toyota Camry for JGR and the No. 96 Toyota Camry for Hall of Fame Racing, both in 2008 on a part-time basis.

Logano is currently the youngest ever winner in two of NASCAR's three top divisions. Logano's first major NASCAR win came during the Meijer 300 at Kentucky Speedway in just his third start in the 2008 Nationwide Series. He became the youngest driver to win a Nationwide Series race at 18 years, 21 days old. The previous youngest was Casey Atwood in 1999 at 18 years, 313 days. Logano became the youngest winner in Cup Series history when he won the 2009 Lenox Industrial Tools 301 at New Hampshire Motor Speedway at 19 years, 35 days. The previous youngest was Kyle Busch in 2005 at 20 years, 125 days. Logano is also the first NASCAR driver born in the 1990s to have competed in NASCAR's three major divisions. In 2015, he became the second-youngest Daytona 500 winner; only Trevor Bayne was younger.

== Racing career ==
=== Early racing career ===
Logano began his racing career in 1996 as a six-year-old quarter midget racer living in Connecticut. In 1997, he won his first Eastern Grand National Championship in the Junior Stock Car Division. He followed it up with a Junior Honda Division Championship in 1998 and in early 1999 a Lt. Mod. Division Championship. Later in 1999, Logano won three New England Regional Championships in Sr. Stock, Lt. Mod, and Lt. B divisions. He spent a couple of years racing on various forms of pavement Late Model racing.

Veteran Nextel Cup Series driver Mark Martin, who was driving for Jack Roush (Roush Fenway Racing) at the time, called Logano "the real deal"; when Logano was fifteen, Martin said "I am high on Joey Logano because I am absolutely, 100-percent positive, without a doubt that he can be one of the greatest that ever raced in NASCAR. I'm positive. There's no doubt in mind." Logano was also nicknamed "sliced bread" (as in the greatest thing since) by two-time Busch Series champion Randy LaJoie.

In 2005, he ran in one FASCAR Pro Truck Series race at the New Smyrna Speedway, started first and finished second. He raced in the USAR Hooters Pro Cup Series, competing seven times in the Northern Division, and winning once at Mansfield, two Southern Division races, and five Championship Series races. The following season, he continued racing in the USAR Hooters Pro Cup Series. He raced in twelve Southern Division races, winning twice at South Georgia Motorsports Park and USA International Speedway. He ran in one USAR Hooters Pro Cup Series, Northern Division race, and six Championship Series races.

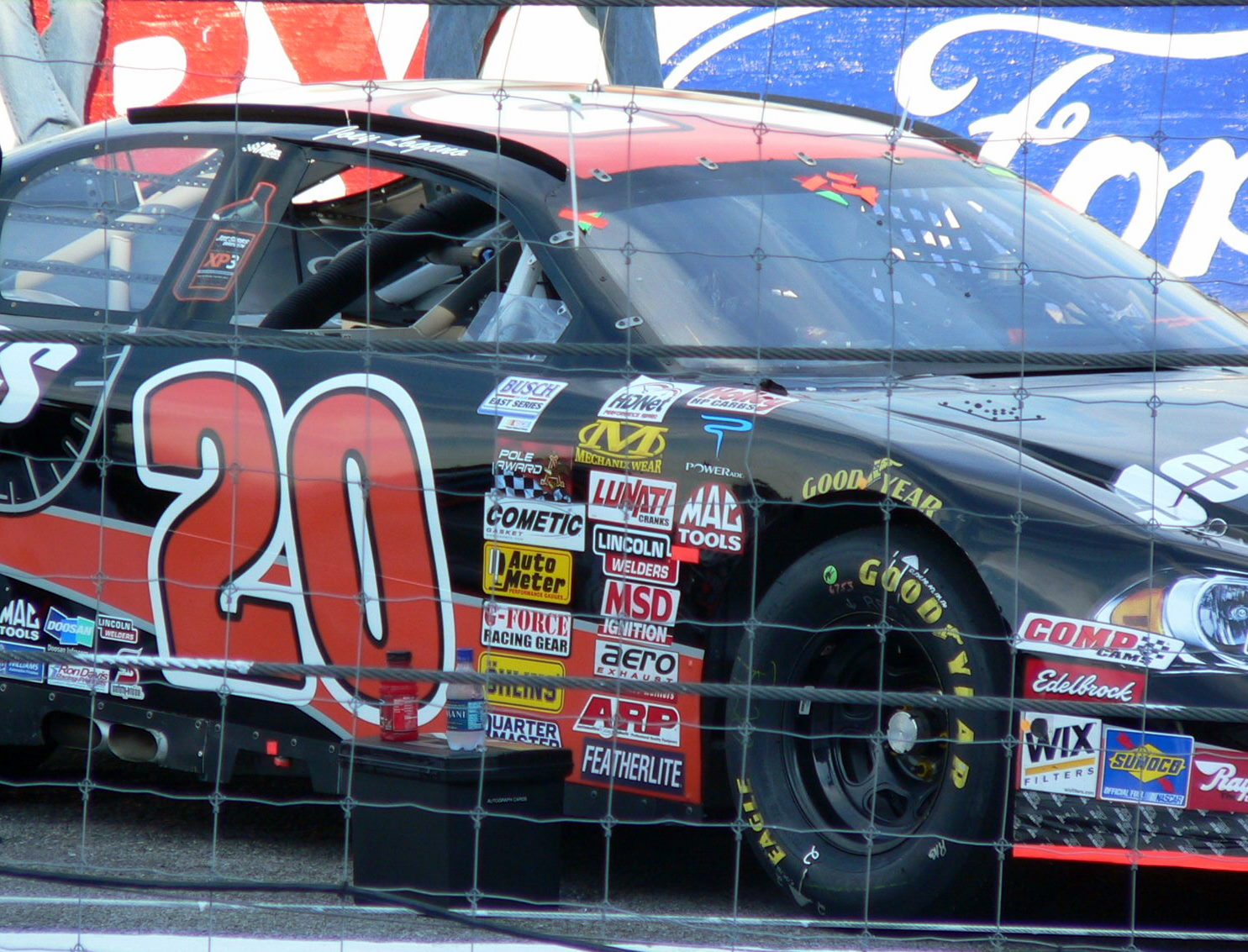
Logano's 2007 Camping World East Series championship racecar

In 2007, a new NASCAR rule allowed drivers aged sixteen and up to race in the Grand National Division, allowing Logano to compete in the series. He finished the 2007 Grand National season with 13 starts in Camping World East Series, winning five races, three poles, ten top-fives, and ten top-tens, and winning the championship with wins at Greenville-Pickens Speedway, Iowa Speedway, two wins at New Hampshire International Speedway, and Adirondack International Speedway. He also has made one NASCAR West Series start at Phoenix International Raceway, where he started second and won in the No. 10 Joe Gibbs Racing Toyota. On October 20, 2007, Logano won the Toyota All-Star Showdown at Irwindale Speedway, leading 87 laps and holding off Peyton Sellers for the win.

On May 4, 2008, Logano won the Carolina 500 during his ARCA RE/MAX Series debut with Venturini Motorsports in racing's return to Rockingham Speedway. Logano also made his NASCAR Craftsman Truck Series debut, at Talladega, in the Mountain Dew 250, starting sixth and finishing 26th. Logano attempted to defend his Toyota All-Star Showdown title, which he won in the 2007 season, by driving in the January 2008 race and was disqualified for crashing into Peyton Sellers in an unsportsmanlike manner on the final lap, in an attempt to win the race. Not only was Logano disqualified, but he was credited as having run none of the laps of the race, completing zero laps.

=== Xfinity Series and Craftsman Truck Series ===
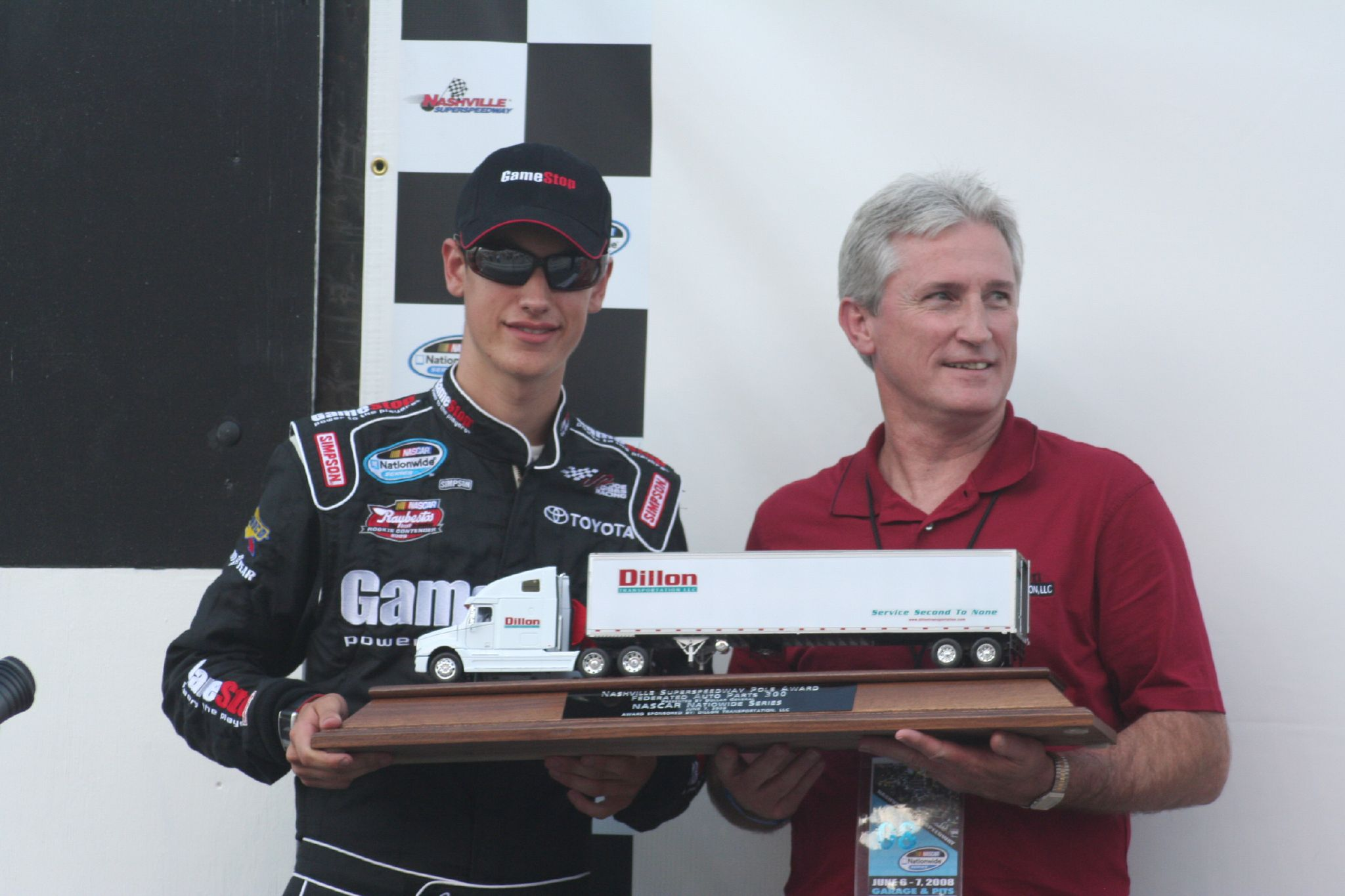
Logano holds his trophy for winning the pole position in Nashville.

Logano made his NASCAR Nationwide Series debut at the 2008 Heluva Good! 200 at Dover.

Logano became the youngest winner in Nationwide history by winning his first major NASCAR series race at the 2008 Meijer 300 in only his third start, the previous holder of the achievement was Casey Atwood. On July 10, 2009, Logano won the Dollar General 300 by deciding not to pit unlike his teammate Kyle Busch, who took four tires with twelve laps to go. By leading the pack, the clean air made it easy to beat Joe Gibbs Racing teammate Kyle Busch by five car lengths, making it the first time he won at the racetrack in Chicago. He took his fifth series victory at the Kansas Speedway after a late-race pass over teammate Kyle Busch. He earned his sixth Nationwide Series victory at the Auto Club Speedway. In April 2009, Logano won the NASCAR Nationwide Series race in Nashville. On July 1, 2011, he won the Subway Jalapeño 250 at Daytona International Speedway, avoiding a last-second crash. In mid-2011, Logano made a cameo appearance in the A&E series The Glades, in the episode "Moonlighting", as himself.

In 2012, he won nine times in the Nationwide Series. He won at Auto Club Speedway, after dominating the race in the Trans-Lux Camry. He won his second race of the season at Talladega Superspeedway after a push from Kyle Busch and holding off Ricky Stenhouse Jr. and Cole Whitt. His third win of the year came with controversy on a late restart; he took out the points leader Elliott Sadler and went on to take the win. His fourth win came at Dover International Speedway, after passing Ryan Truex with four laps to go after being held back in lapped traffic. His fifth win came at Michigan International Speedway after holding off James Buescher on the final restart. In August at Bristol, Loe restarted, holding off Elliott Sadler to win his first win at Bristol in his career. He went on to complete the year sweep of the Nationwide races at Dover, and in October, won his eighth race of the year at Charlotte. In November, he won the Nationwide race at Phoenix. This would ultimately be the final race win Logano would score in a Joe Gibbs Racing car. The Joe Gibbs Racing No. 18 Nationwide car won the 2012 NASCAR Nationwide Owners Championship in part due to Logano's success in the car during the 2012 season.

In 2013 at Dover, Logano won both the NNS races for a third and fourth consecutive time in the Nationwide series. This made him the only driver to win four consecutive races at Dover in any series, and the all-time wins leader in the Nationwide Series at the track. In addition to his wins at Dover, he took home a Nationwide win at Chicagoland Speedway during a cup series off week in July. The Team Penske No. 22 car won the Nationwide Series owners title in 2013, a feat Logano has now contributed to three times in his career—once at Penske and twice at JGR. The 2013 Nationwide Series owners' title was a first for Team Penske.

In May 2014 at Dover, Logano saw his four-race winning streak come to an end when Kyle Busch won the spring race at the track. Logano looked to be in a good position to win, starting from the pole for the fourth time at the track, but he was held up by Matt Kenseth for over sixty laps, making Busch unreachable. He had to settle for a third-place finish. In his next start in the Nationwide Series at Michigan, Logano was leading with four laps to go and was well on his way to his first win of the season, but suffered a blown tire and was relegated to a 16th-place finish.

Logano started his 2015 Xfinity Series schedule at Atlanta by winning the pole and finishing second. In his second race of the season, Logano finally returned to victory lane in the Xfinity Series at Phoenix International Raceway on March 14, 2015. He won from the pole and led 176 of 200 laps. He also scored his 2nd career perfect driver rating by dominating the race. On April 18, 2015, Logano led every lap of the Drive to Stop Diabetes 300 at Bristol after starting 2nd. As a result, he scored his second Bristol win in the series and third career perfect driver rating.

On March 28, 2015, Logano, driving for Brad Keselowski Racing, started on Pole, led 150 of the 258 laps, and easily won his first Camping World Truck Series race in the Kroger 250 at Martinsville. He became the 26th different driver to win in all three major series, the first since his teammate and truck owner Brad Keselowski did it when he won the UNOH 200 Truck race at Bristol in August 2014. His first pole and win in the series came in his seventh career start. The 2016 Xfinity Series started well for Logano with a close second to Chase Elliott in the season opener at Daytona. In the coming races, however, the Penske No.22 car lacked the speed it had in previous years, with Logano only able to take ninth at Bristol and seventh at Dover. In between these two races, Logano had been in contention for a victory at Talladega up until a last-lap crash, relegating him to the 27th position. Charlotte, Pocono, and Michigan saw finishes of third, fifth, and sixth, respectively. Logano would have to wait till Watkins Glen claims his first win of the season, driving a secondary Penske entry, the No. 12, at Watkins Glen. The majority of the race was a hard-fought contest between Logano and Keselowski, who would eventually encounter issues and retire, allowing Logano to collect his 26th career win. Chicagoland saw Logano struggle again with a lack of speed, driving the 22 to a seventh-place finish. Back in the number 12, Logano would take his 27th career win in the Drive for Cure 300 at Charlotte, stealing the race win from a dominant Kyle Larson, this would be his second and final win of the year. His Xfinity Series campaign ended with a solid fourth at Kansas, unable to take the flagship 22 car to victory lane in 2016.

Logano returned to the Truck Series in 2022, driving the David Gilliland Racing No. 54 to a sixth-place finish at the Bristol dirt race.

For the 2023 Truck Series season, Logano drove the ThorSport Racing No. 66 to victory at the Bristol dirt race after leading 138 of 150 laps.

In the 2024 Xfinity Series season, Logano replaced Hailie Deegan in the AM Racing No. 15 at the Chicago street race.

=== Cup Series ===
==== Joe Gibbs Racing ====
===== 2008: First starts =====
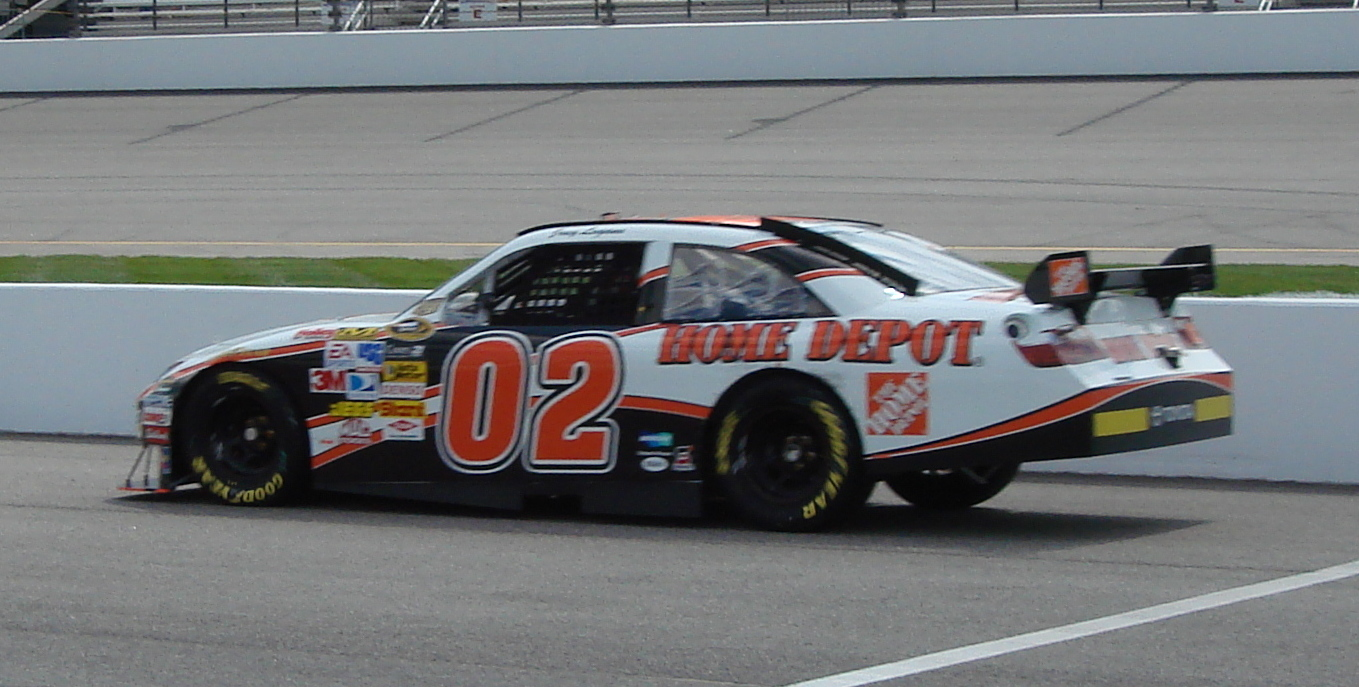
Logano's first Cup practice at Richmond International Raceway

On August 25, 2008, Joe Gibbs Racing called a press conference to announce that Logano would drive the No. 20 Home Depot -sponsored Toyota Camry in the 2009 Sprint Cup Series. Logano replaced Tony Stewart who left JGR to form and drive for his own team, Stewart–Haas Racing. Logano was also a candidate for the 2008 Rookie of the Year award and was scheduled to make his first Sprint Cup start in the No. 02 Home Depot-sponsored car at Richmond, but failed to qualify for the event.

On August 28, 2008, Hall of Fame Racing announced that Logano would drive five races in their No. 96 car during the 2008 Sprint Cup Series season. His official debut was at the 2008 Sylvania 300 at New Hampshire on September 14, 2008, by starting that race, he became the first NASCAR driver born in the 1990s to run a Cup Series event. On September 5, 2008, Logano made his first appearance in a Sprint Cup car at Richmond International Raceway in the two-hour-long Friday practice for the Chevy Rock & Roll 400. Due to Tropical Storm Hanna, qualifying was rained out. A NASCAR rule states that when qualifying is rained out, the Top 43 drivers in owners' points are then set for the race. Logano was not in the Top 43 in owners' points, so he did not get to debut.

Logano is the youngest modern-era driver to compete full-time in NASCAR's top division (records show drivers as young as fifteen competing in NASCAR's top division, but those records will stand due to age requirements).

===== 2009: Rookie in the spotlight =====
In 2009, Logano finished fourth in his first Gatorade Duel, and would become the youngest driver to start the Daytona 500; however, a crash midway through the race resulted in a last-place finish. Logano's first three starts in the Sprint Cup Series saw three finishes of 30th place or worse. Las Vegas was his sixth start in the Sprint Cup Series; he finished thirteenth. In April, Logano finished ninth for his first top-ten finish at Talladega; later that month at Darlington, he led nineteen laps late in the race and finished ninth. Logano won the fan vote for the 2009 NASCAR Sprint All-Star Race and finished eighth.

On June 28, 2009, Logano won the rain-shortened Lenox Industrial Tools 301 at Loudon, New Hampshire, beating Jeff Gordon and Tony Stewart, becoming the youngest winner ever in the Sprint Cup Series at the age of only nineteen years, one month, and four days old.

On November 22, 2009, Logano was crowned the official 2009 Sprint Cup Series Raybestos Rookie of the Year, having beat out other rookies Scott Speed and Max Papis.

===== 2010: Youngest pole winner =====
Logano won his first Coors Light Pole Award on March 19, 2010, for the Food City 500 at Bristol Motor Speedway. Despite going winless, he scored seven top-fives and sixteen top-tens en route to a then-best sixteenth place finish in the final points standings.

===== 2011: Forgettable season =====
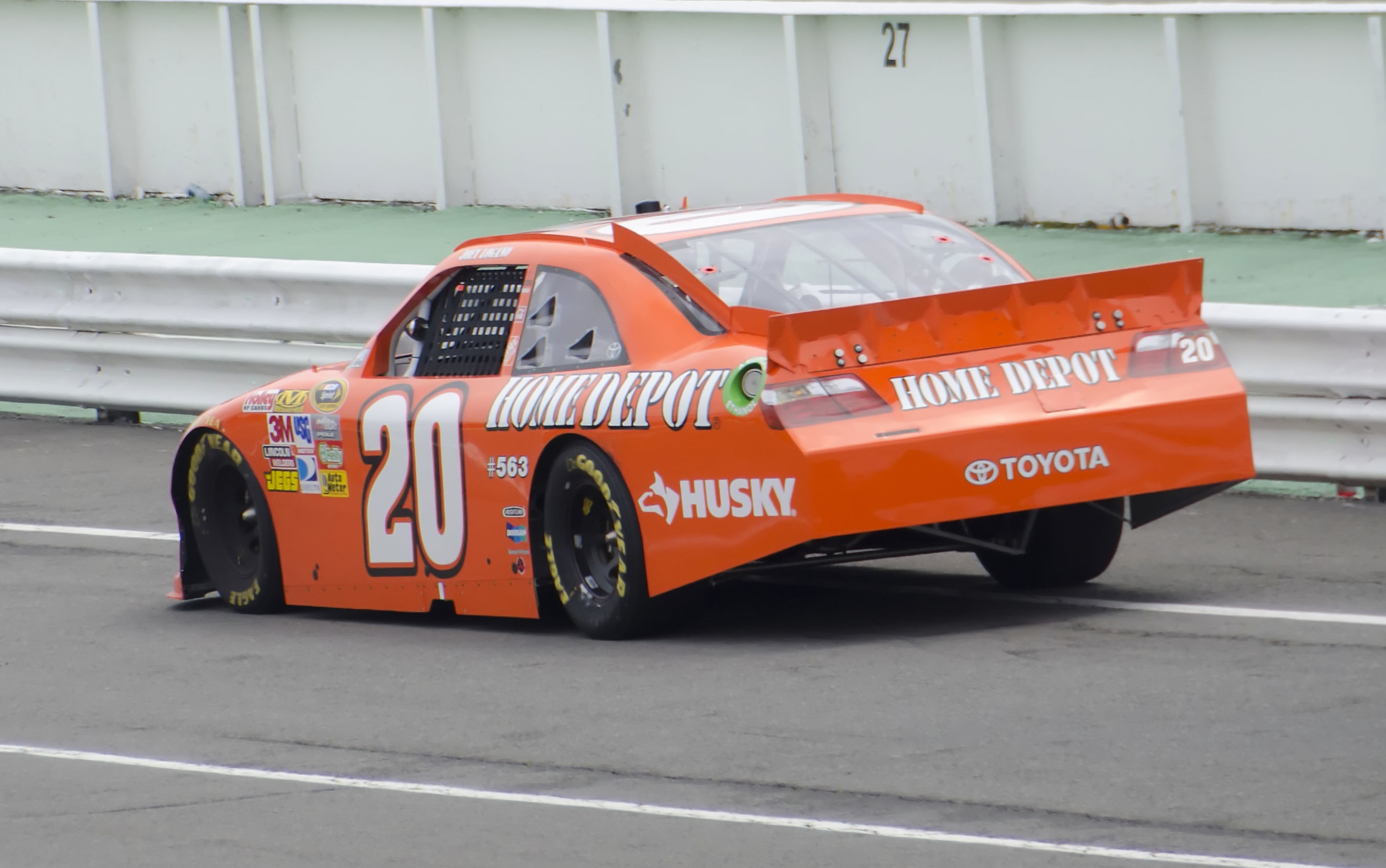
Logano during the 2011 Good Sam RV Insurance 500 at Pocono Raceway

Logano struggled through the 2011 season, with just four top-fives, six top-tens, and two pole positions, en route to a career-worst 24th-place finish in the final points standings.

===== 2012: Final season at Gibbs =====
Crew chief Greg Zipadelli left the No. 20 team at the end of the 2011 season to become the competition director at Stewart–Haas Racing. Jason Ratcliff was named Logano's new crew chief beginning with the 2012 season.

In 2012, following several wins in the Nationwide Series, Logano won his second Sprint Cup Series race at the Pocono 400 at Pocono Raceway, after bumping Mark Martin with four laps to go, and holding off Martin and Tony Stewart. Logano became the first driver in thirty races to win a race from the pole position. It was also the first time Logano had won a race that had gone the scheduled distance (as his 2009 victory had been in a rain-shortened event). He scored one other top-five and eleven other top-ten finishes en route to a 17th-place finish in the final points standings. He also ended his final Nationwide series at Joe Gibbs Racing on a high note, winning a series-high nine races.

==== Team Penske ====
===== 2013: Career redemption =====
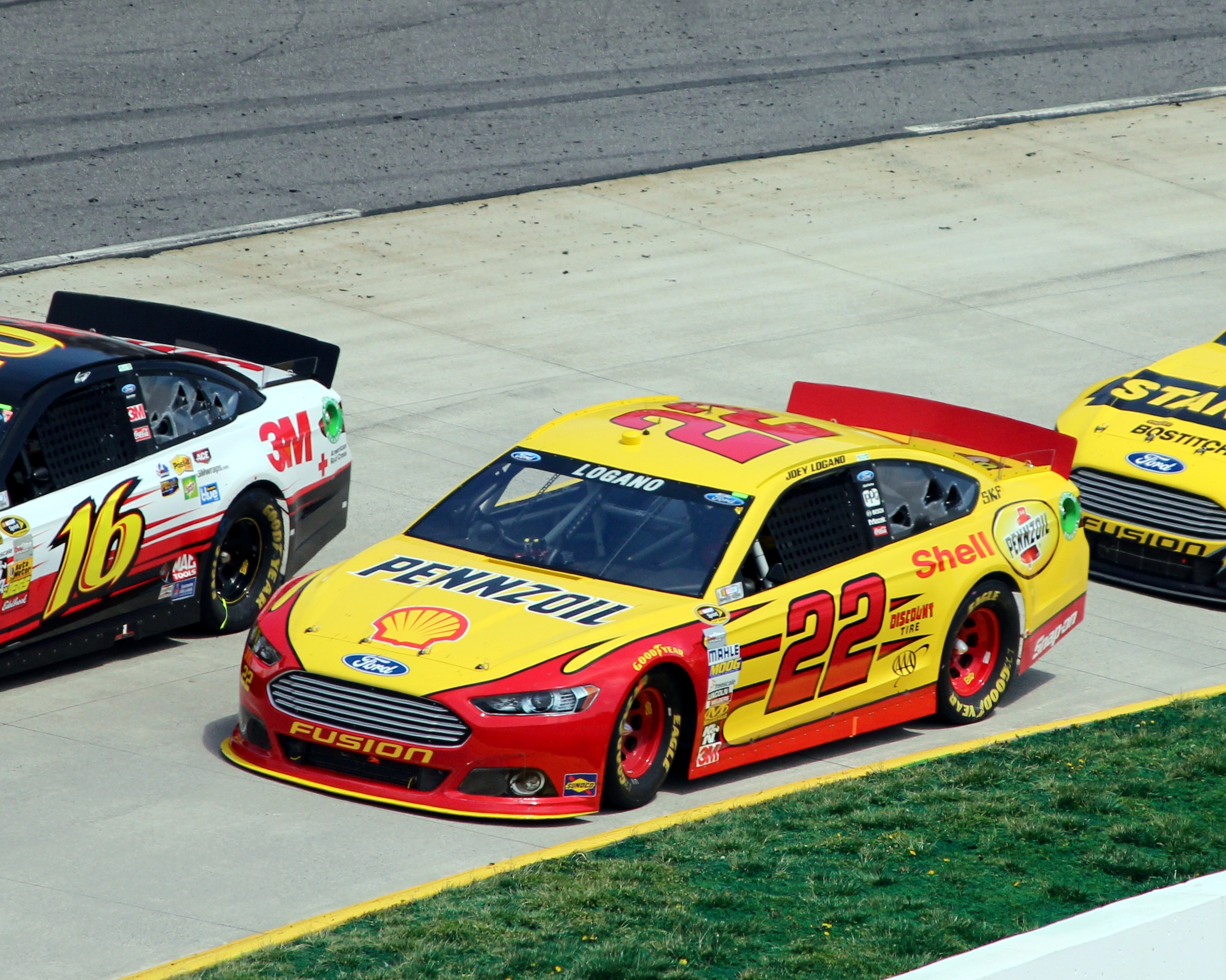
Logano during the 2013 STP Gas Booster 500

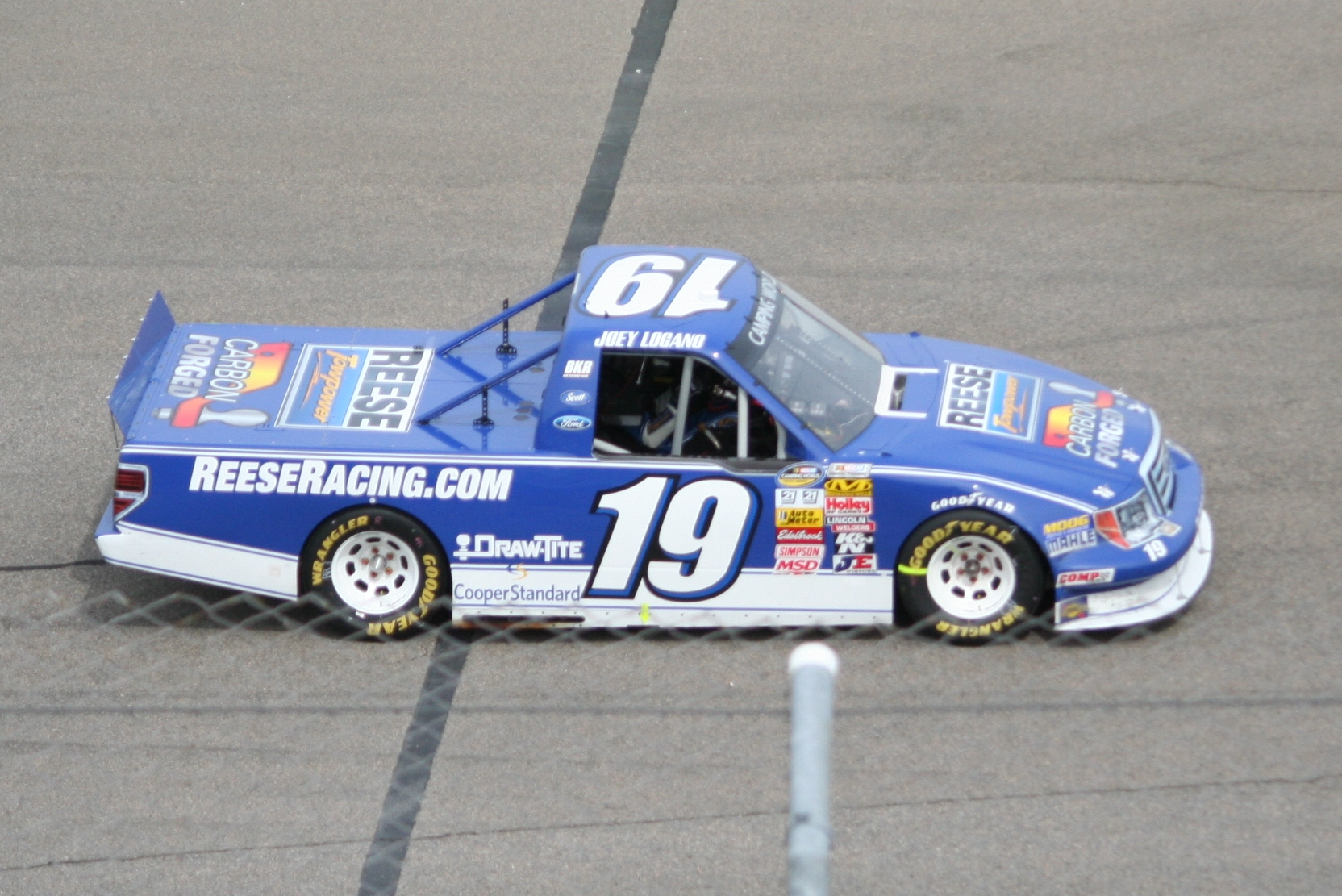
Logano's 2013 Truck Series truck

On September 4, 2012, it was announced that Logano would be leaving Joe Gibbs Racing and heading to Penske Racing in 2013, following an announcement that Matt Kenseth would drive the No. 20 Toyota.

Logano moved to the No. 22 Shell / Pennzoil-sponsored Ford for Penske, finishing seventeenth at Bristol after losing control after contact with Denny Hamlin. Late in the race, it would appear that Logano passed Hamlin on the track, but both had issues and Hamlin finished 23rd; Logano claimed that his former teammate intentionally wrecked him.

The next week, at Auto Club Speedway, Logano had his breakout race, leading 41 laps. The final laps saw an intense dogfight between him and Hamlin; on the last lap proper, Logano and Hamlin were driving hard side by side down the straightaway, in what looked like what was going to be a repeat of the photo finish from Darlington in 2003 but on the last corner, neither car lifted, both wrecked, while Kyle Busch slipped past and took the victory. Hamlin fractured his vertebra in the crash and after the race, Logano was confronted by Tony Stewart, who slipped back to 22nd after Logano blocked him on the final restart. Stewart pushed Logano, who responded by throwing a water bottle at him. Logano was scored in 3rd place.

Just before the start of the NRA 500 at Texas Motor Speedway, both Penske Racing cars driven by Logano and Keselowski failed pre-race inspection due to an issue with the cars' rear-end housings. Logano was forced to start from the rear of the field because his car wasn't on the starting grid until after the command had been given, but he rallied for a fifth-place finish. Three days later, NASCAR unveiled large penalties for the infraction. Logano and Keselowski were each docked 25 points in the drivers' championship standings; Logano's crew chief, Todd Gordon, was also fined $100,000 and suspended six weeks. Car chief Raymond Fox and team engineer Samuel Stanley were suspended for the same length of time as well. Identical penalties were also handed down to all of the people in the same positions on Keselowski's team. Penske Racing released a statement saying the organization planned to appeal the penalties, but on May 1, the NASCAR Appeals Panel unanimously upheld the penalties. Team owner Roger Penske said he would further appeal the ruling to NASCAR Chief Appellate Officer John Middlebrook.

Meanwhile, on the track after Logano's fifth-place finish at Texas, he had a low weekend at Kansas when he collided with a spinning Kyle Busch on lap 105, destroying the front ends of both cars and ending their days. This would relegate Logano to a 39th-place finish. He was able to rebound the following week at Richmond with a third-place run. At Talladega, Logano finished 35th with an engine failure after 143 laps. At Darlington, he struggled with the handling of his car and finished 22nd, two laps down.

After racing at Darlington, Logano rallied to finish in the top eleven in a six-race streak going into the summer — fifth at Charlotte, seventh at Dover, tenth at Pocono, ninth at Michigan, eleventh at Sonoma, and fourth at Kentucky.

Returning to Daytona for the Coke Zero 400, Logano was running well until he cut a tire and hit the outside wall on lap 71, leaving him with a 40th-place finish. He then had another 40th-place finish the following week at New Hampshire after being involved in a crash early in the race.

After a two-race streak of bad luck, Logano picked up steam again, with six straight top-ten finishes — eighth at Indianapolis, and then seventh at both Pocono and Watkins Glen.

In qualifying at Michigan, Logano won his sixth career pole position with a track-record lap speed of 203.949 miles per hour (328.224 km/h); this was at the time the ninth fastest qualifying speed in NASCAR history, and the fastest since Bill Elliott's qualifying run at Talladega in 1987. He later went on to win the Pure Michigan 400, making it his first win with Penske Racing. Thanks to that win, and two more Top 5's at both Bristol and Atlanta (where he led 78 laps and almost won), he entered Richmond eighth in the standings with a shot to make the Chase for the first time in his career. At Richmond, he struggled with an ill-handling racecar to a 22nd-place finish, but it was good enough to where he beat Jeff Gordon (who finished eighth) by just one point for tenth in the points and made his first-ever appearance in the Chase. Even if he had fallen to eleventh, he still would have had the second wild card thanks to being ahead of Martin Truex Jr. and Ryan Newman in points (Kasey Kahne had already locked up the first Wildcard with wins at Bristol and Pocono). Also, thanks to the win, Logano was seeded sixth in the Cup standings after it was reset.

Logano started his first Chase run by qualifying on pole in GEICO 400 at Chicagoland with a new track qualifying speed record of 189.414 mph. However, he finished 37th due to an engine failure late in the race. This was followed by a 14th-place finish at New Hampshire. Logano then had back-to-back top-fives with a third-place finish at Dover and a fourth-place finish at Kansas. This was followed by three top-twenty finishes — eighteenth at Charlotte, sixteenth at Talladega, and fourteenth at Martinsville. He finished out the season with three straight top-ten finishes — third at Texas, ninth at Phoenix, and eighth at Homestead-Miami, leading him to a career-best eighth-place finish in the final points.

===== 2014: Breakout season =====
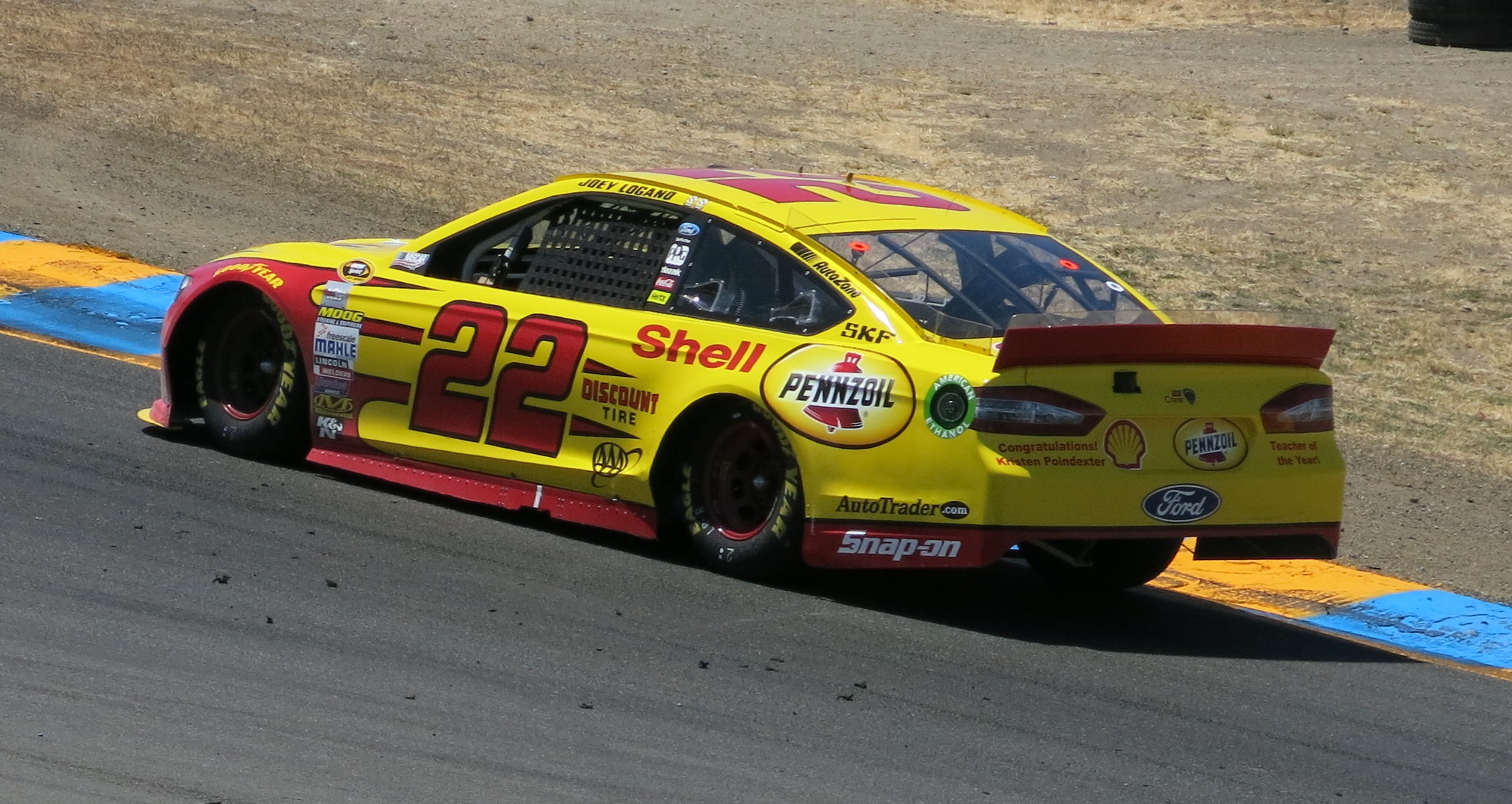
Logano racing at Sonoma Raceway in 2014

Logano started with an eleventh-place finish in the 2014 Daytona 500, followed by a fourth-place run at Phoenix. He won his first pole of the year at Las Vegas, taking another fourth-place finish.

At Texas, Logano, running with consistent speed, got his first win of the season after leading the most laps (108) and performing a last-lap pass on Jeff Gordon during a green-white-checkered finish. This win locked him into the 2014 Chase.

At Richmond (a track where he had seen little success in his short career), Logano led late and pulled a Ron Bouchard-style move during a shuffle between Jeff Gordon, Brad Keselowski, and Matt Kenseth in the last nine laps, to slip away with a victory. The victory marked 2014 as Logano's first season with multiple career victories.

Logano made his 200th Cup Series start at Kentucky Speedway on June 28 at the age of 24.

At Loudon, Logano was running second to Keselowski when he was involved in an accident with the lap-down car of Morgan Shepherd. Logano said in an interview that Shepherd should not have been on the track running those very slow speeds, but NASCAR responded that Shepherd maintained minimum speed.

Logano took his third win of the season at Bristol in the Irwin Tools Night Race. Keselowski finished second in the same race, making this Team Penske's second 1–2 finish in its history, the other coming in the 2008 Daytona 500.

Logano started the Chase seeded fifth. He finished in fourth place in the Challenger Round opener at Chicagoland Speedway, moving him to third in points.

Logano would go on to win at New Hampshire, locking him into the Contender Round. He took four tires on lap 247, while the other front-runners ran on older tires, giving Logano the advantage. Remarkably, he was able to move from sixteenth to second in 11 laps. He took the lead with 27 to go and won the race after a green-white-checkered finish. The win moved him to second in the points standings – one point behind Keselowski. This win marked Penske's third win in a row and fourth in five races.

On September 25, 2014, it was announced that Logano had signed a multi-year contract extension with Team Penske. This extension came a full season before his contract was due to expire at the end of the 2015 season. The contract extends Logano's tenure with Team Penske to at least 2018.

At Dover, Logano would finish fourth, making him the only driver to finish top-five in all three races of the contender round. He would finish the round second in points.

Logano started the Contender Round by winning at Kansas. This gave him the lead in the point standings for the first time in his career. With the win, he was the first driver to advance to the Eliminator Round in the Chase for the Sprint Cup. Logano followed this up with a fourth-place finish at Charlotte. This was his fifth straight top-five finish, making him the first driver to start the Chase with five straight top-five finishes, beating the previous record of four set by Juan Pablo Montoya in 2009.

At Talladega, Logano finished eleventh after helping Keselowski get to the front on the final restart. Keselowski required a win to advance to the next round of the Chase and was able to achieve that in part thanks to Logano.

Logano entered the Eliminator Round as the points leader, beginning with a fifth-place finish at Martinsville. At Texas, he fought back from pit road tire issues that led to a spin-out and finished twelfth. Going into the final race of the Eliminator round, Logano was tied for first in points with a 13-point advantage over the final transfer spot. He would finish sixth at Phoenix, easily advancing to the Championship round alongside Denny Hamlin, Ryan Newman, and Kevin Harvick.

In the final round, he ended up finishing last of the final four drivers. The result was affected by some mistakes made by his pit crew, relegating him to a 16th-place finish.

Logano and his teammate Keselowski were both dominant in the new knockout-style qualifying in 2014. Logano had one pole, eight top-two starts, and started in the top ten in 26 of 36 races. He missed the final round of qualifying in only five of the 36 races, a series best. Logano was consistently near the top of most major statistical categories in 2014, including laps led, average start, average finish, and average driver rating. He was one of only seven drivers who won multiple races in 2014 (the others being Keselowski, Jimmie Johnson, Jeff Gordon, Dale Earnhardt Jr., series champion Kevin Harvick, and Carl Edwards).

===== 2015: Failed Championship run =====
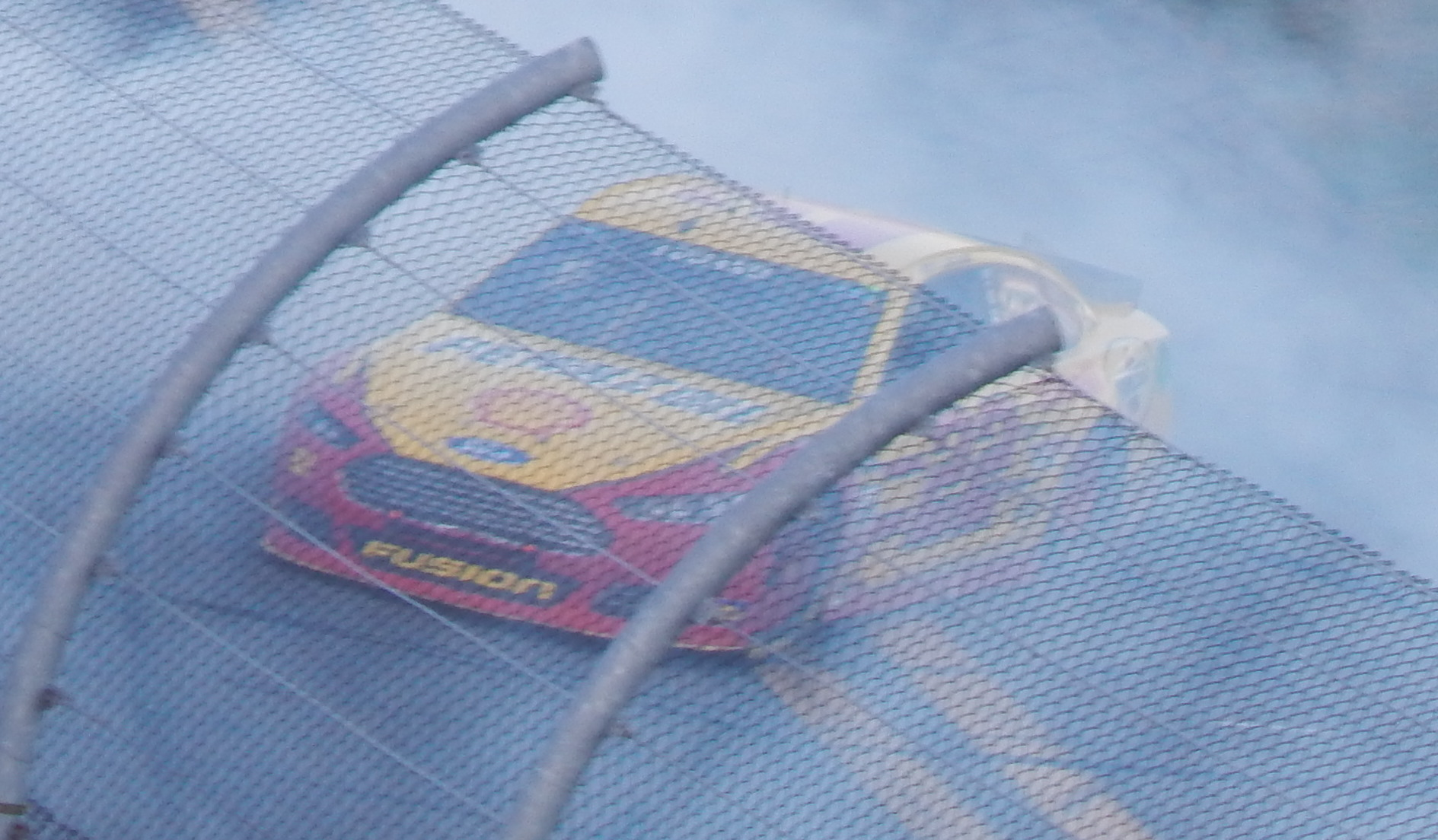
Logano doing burnouts after winning the Daytona 500

Logano's season began with an incident with Kevin Harvick during the Sprint Unlimited. Harvick, who questioned a late-race incident with Logano, exchanged heated words with Logano.

The following week, Logano held off Harvick to win the Daytona 500. At the time of his win, Logano became the second-youngest winner of the Daytona 500 at 24 years of age (second only to Trevor Bayne). He has since been surpassed by 2022 Daytona 500 winner Austin Cindric for the second youngest winner, but remains the third youngest driver to have won the race. The win also gave team owner Roger Penske his second victory in the race, his first coming with Ryan Newman in 2008. The next week, he won the pole at Atlanta Motor Speedway and finished fourth.

At Las Vegas Motor Speedway, he qualified second and led early but would ultimately fade to finish 10th after having two pit-road speeding penalties. At Phoenix International Raceway, he started on the front row for the third consecutive week and led laps early, even though he would ultimately finish eighth.

At Auto Club Speedway, Logano started thirteenth and ran in the top-five most of the day, but a controversial late-race pit road violation set him back in the field; however, he recovered quickly to finish seventh. With his finish on the lead lap at Auto Club, Logano broke the record for most consecutive finishes on the lead lap with 22 (he would extend that record to 24 races). The previous record was held by Jeff Gordon and Dale Earnhardt Jr. with 21 each.

The next week at Martinsville, he became the 26th driver (after teammate Brad Keselowski) to have won in each of the Top 3 series by winning the Kroger 250 from the pole after leading the most laps, his final start in the Truck Series to date. He also won his second Cup pole of the season and during the race, led the second-most laps and finished third. At Texas, he started sixth, led nineteen laps, and finished fourth.

At Bristol, Logano and Keselowski wrecked out early, ending Logano's streak of finishes on the lead lap. At Richmond, Logano won the pole and finished fifth. At Talladega, Logano was caught up in a multicar wreck on the back straightaway on lap 47 and finished 33rd. He dropped from second to fourth in the points standings after the race. At Kansas, Logano did much better. He won the pole for the fourth time and once again, finished fifth.

In August, Logano ran out of fuel while leading the final laps at Pocono. At Watkins Glen, Logano started sixteenth and went on to win the race, leading only the final lap after Harvick ran out of fuel before entering the final two turns. For Logano, the win also marked a complete sweep of the weekend, having won the Xfinity race.

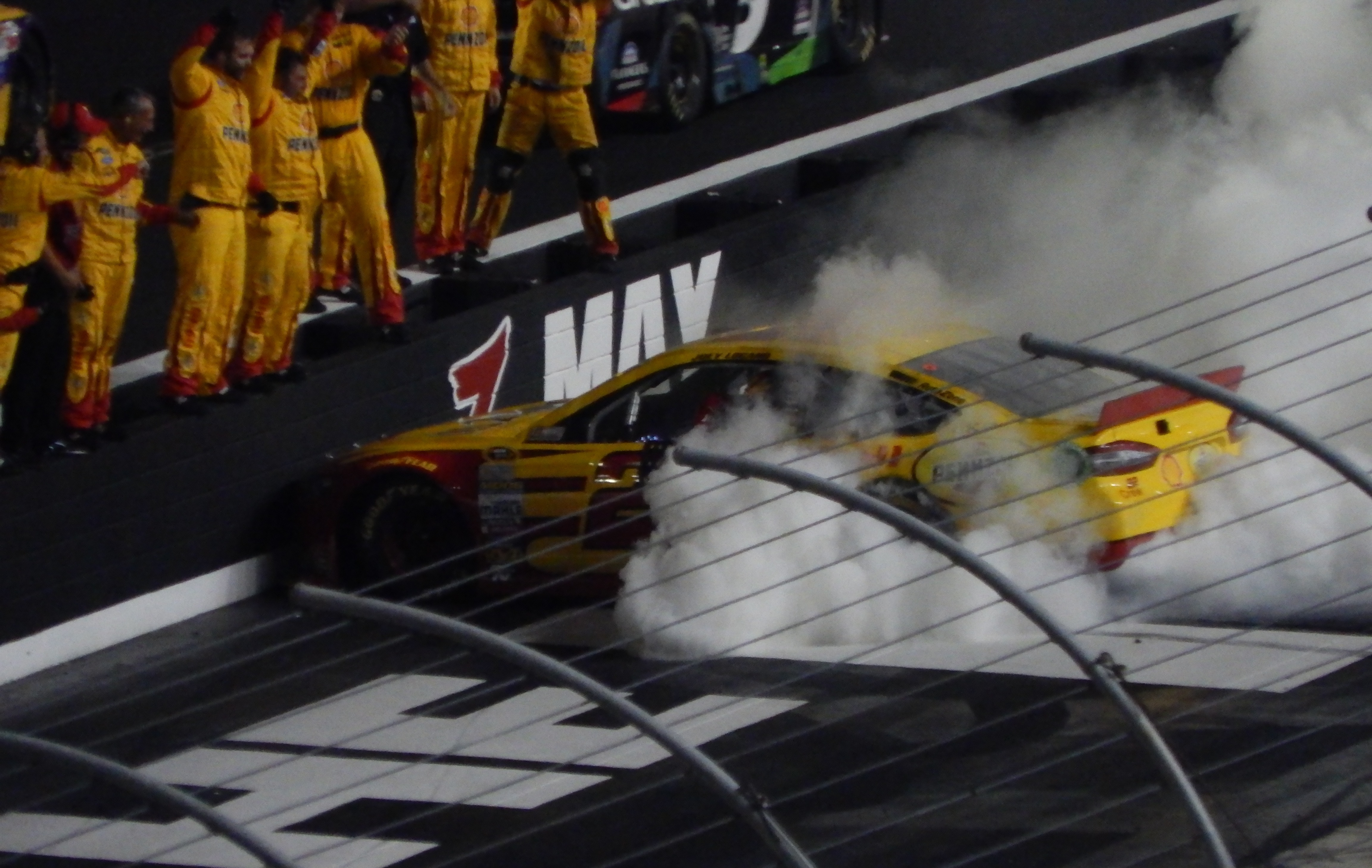
Logano celebrates winning the 2015 Irwin Tools Night Race.

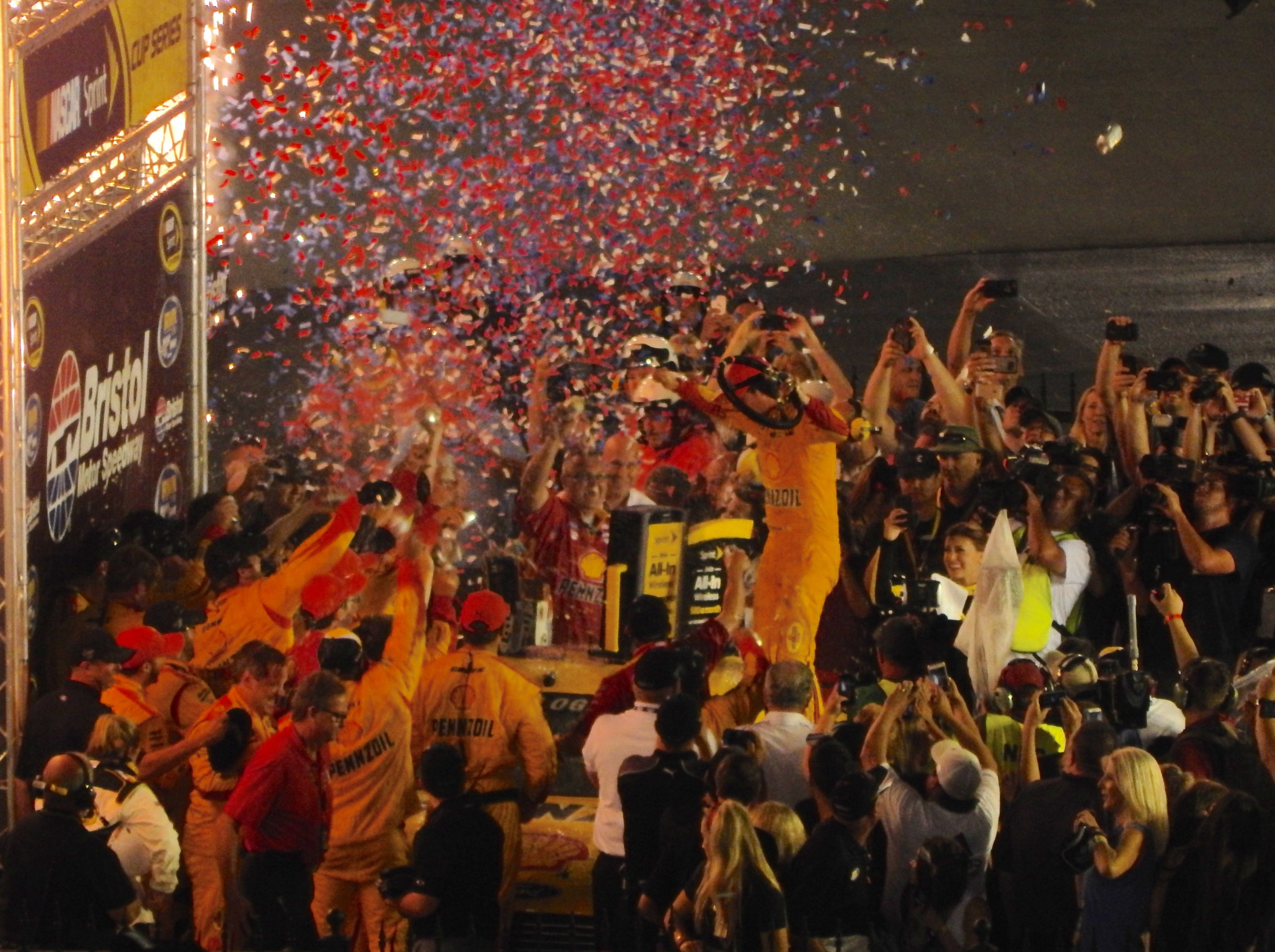
Logano in victory lane after winning the Irwin Tools Night Race

At Michigan, Logano went on to bring home a seventh-place finish in the Pure Michigan 400. At Bristol, he took his third victory of the year with a win in the Irwin Tools Night Race. In the Chase, he swept the Contender Round races by dominating Charlotte, passing Matt Kenseth by purposely spinning him out with five laps remaining to win at Kansas and a dramatic win at Talladega that knocked Dale Earnhardt Jr. out of the Chase by one position. Also in the process, he became the second driver in 2015 after Kyle Busch to sweep three consecutive races.

The next week at Martinsville, Logano had the dominant car for most of the race. However, Matt Kenseth, in retaliation for Logano spinning him out a couple of weeks earlier, deliberately crashed Logano with less than fifty laps to go; an action that was met with mixed emotions from drivers, but the fans erupted with applause. Kenseth was suspended for the next two races and placed on probation until December 31.

Logano didn't do well at Texas, cutting a tire and spinning out, winding up 40th. Heading into Phoenix, Logano needed a win in order to advance to the final round. Ultimately, he failed, as he finished third and was eliminated from the Chase at Phoenix International Raceway after a controversial finish where Dale Earnhardt Jr. won the race thanks to a storm in the area. Logano went on to finish fourth at the season finale, and finished sixth in the final point standings.

===== 2016: Heartbreak at Homestead =====
In 2016, Logano had a rocky start compared to 2015. Logano won his third straight pole at Martinsville; however, he would struggle throughout the race before finishing 11th. At Kansas and Talladega, Logano went back-to-back with DNFs from crashes. Logano won his first Sprint Cup All-Star Race after making a pass on Kyle Larson with two laps remaining. He won the FireKeepers Casino 400 after a good final restart. He won the race from the pole, the second time he won from the pole at Michigan. This was followed by a third-place finish at Sonoma and fourth place at Daytona.

At Kentucky, Logano had an early exit on lap 54 after cutting a right-front tire, finishing 39th. Logano fought back with a third-place finish at New Hampshire and a seventh-place finish at Indianapolis.

At Pocono, while on lap 115, Logano was racing Ryan Newman to his outside and Denny Hamlin to his inside when Chase Elliott got to his inside, got loose, got into Logano, and sent both of them into the wall. Logano finished 37th. Following this, Logano went on a seven-race stretch with a worst finish of 11th place: second place at Watkins Glen, 10th place at Bristol and Michigan, fifth place at Darlington, 10th place at Richmond, second place in Chicagoland, eleventh in New Hampshire, and fifth place at Dover.

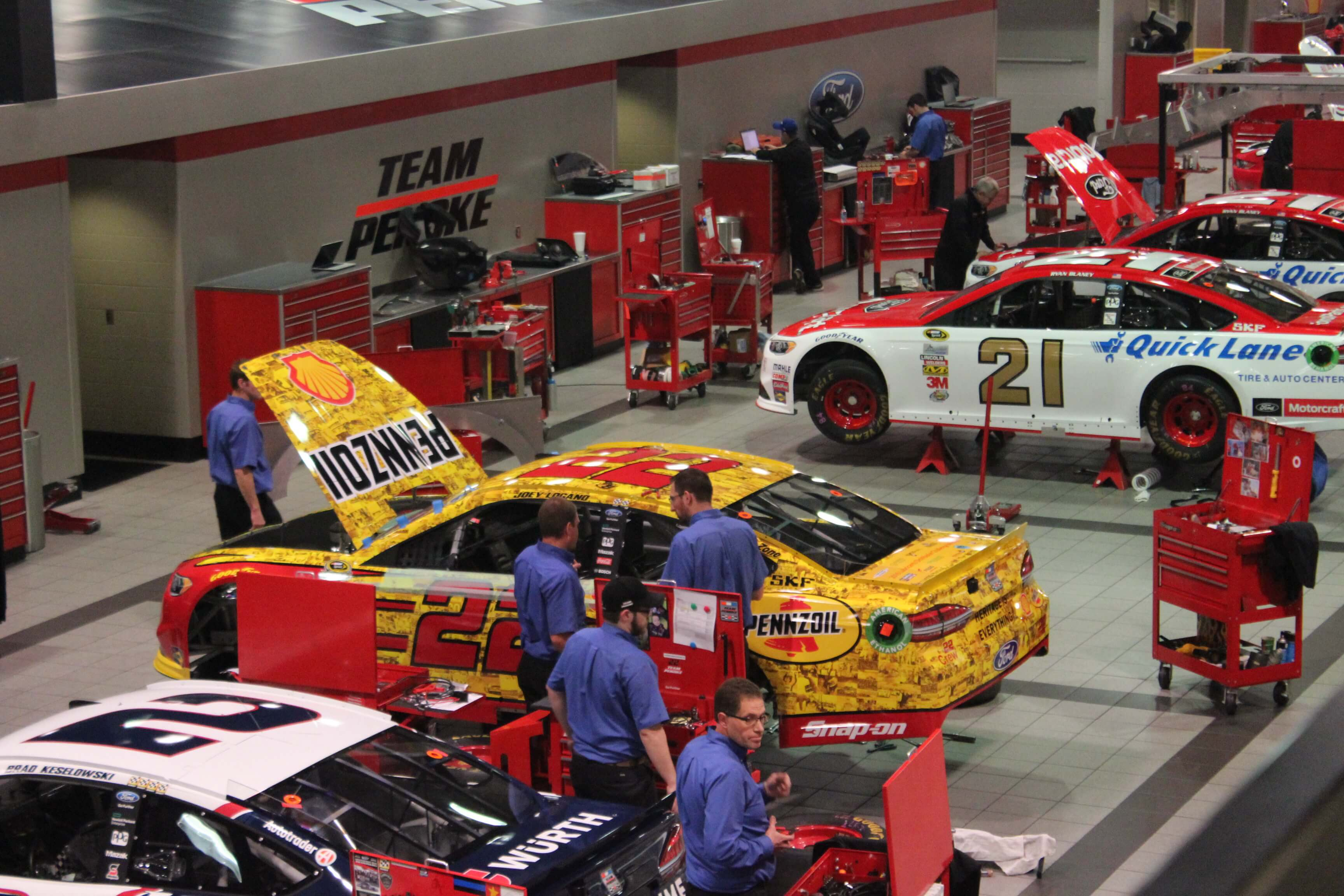
Logano's 2016 Homestead car being prepared inside Team Penske's Mooresville, NC Race Shop

At Charlotte, the opening race in the Round of 12, Logano's day ended early with a series of tire blowouts, leaving him with a 36th-place finish. This was followed by a third-place finish at Kansas. At Talladega, Logano was penalized early when his car left pit road dragging the jack during the first round of green-flag pit stops, but went on to win the race in overtime and clinched a spot in the Round of 8. The win marked the third straight restrictor-plate victory for Team Penske, after Keselowski's earlier victories at Talladega and Daytona. A win at Phoenix guaranteed Logano a place in the final 4 at Homestead.

Logano led 45 laps at Homestead and had a significant chance to win his first Cup series championship. With 10 laps left, Logano restarted under leader Carl Edwards, and Edwards on the restart attempted to block the 22, but it was too late, spinning the No. 19 of Edwards into the inside wall, resulting in a DNF for the 19 and some damage to the 22. After a thirty-minute red flag, Logano's car was too damaged to contend any further, and Logano finished the race in fourth place, finishing second in the standings to Jimmie Johnson.

===== 2017: Championship 4 to missing the playoffs =====
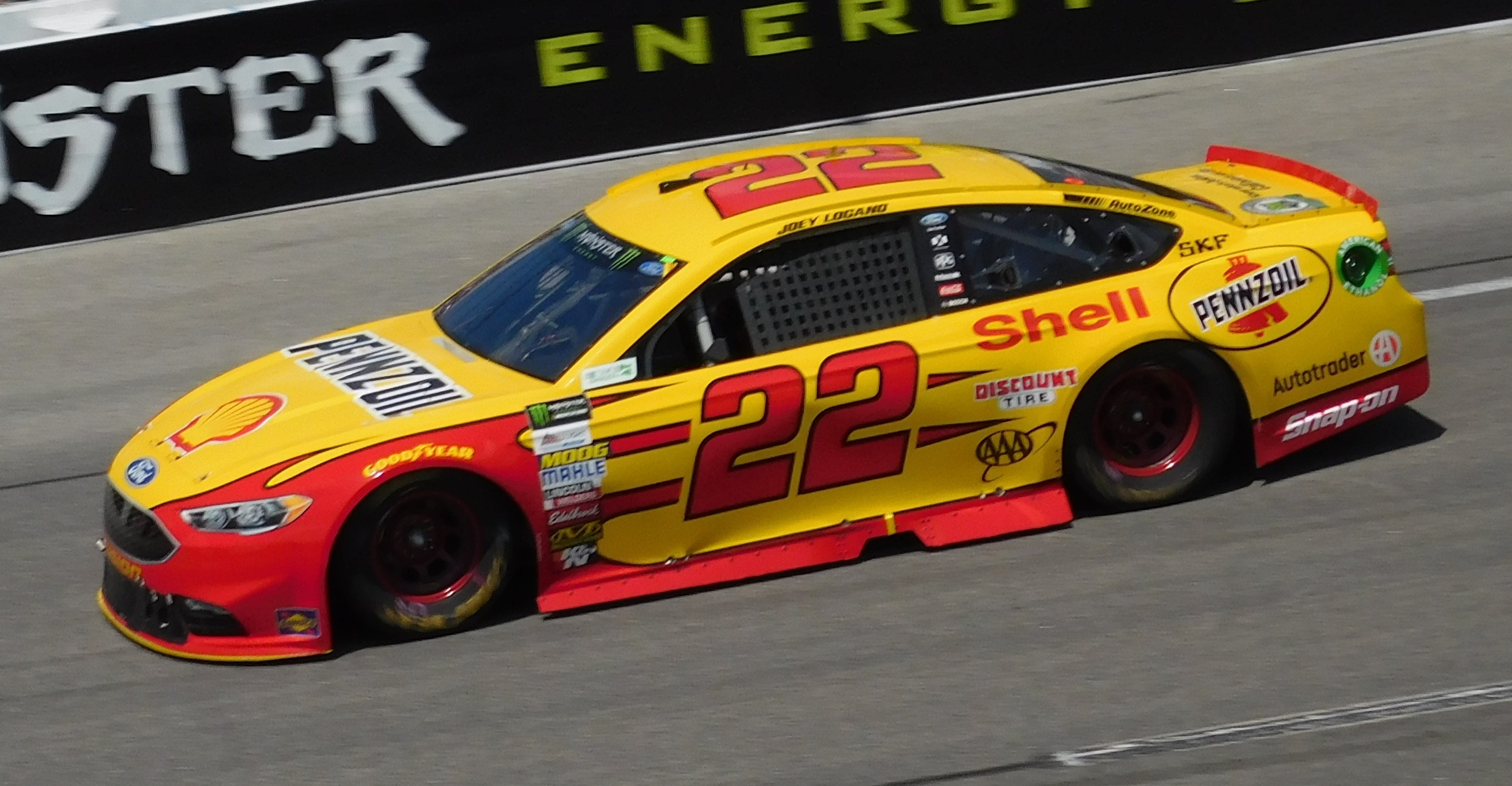
Logano's race-winning car during the 2017 Toyota Owners 400

Unlike in previous years at Penske, Logano had a miserable year. He started the year, however, by winning the Advance Auto Parts Clash after sneaking through the last lap incident between Brad Keselowski and Denny Hamlin. Logano's 2017 season started with a sixth-place finish in the Daytona 500. In the Kobalt 400 at Las Vegas, Logano collided with Kyle Busch as the two battled for a top-five finish on the final lap. The contact spun Busch out and onto pit road; Logano finished fourth, while Busch dropped to 22nd. After the race, Busch confronted Logano on pit road, attempting to punch him as their pit crews became involved. Busch suffered a bloody forehead in the ensuing brawl, though neither driver was penalized for the fight. In an ironic twist at the following week's race in Phoenix, Logano's tire blew with five laps to go to bring out the caution as Busch was in contention to win. As a result, Ryan Newman stayed out for the final restart and went on to win. At Richmond, Logano made his 300th cup start. Despite qualifying fifth, he would start from the 37th spot due to a transmission change. Logano would slowly work his way to the front before winning his second career race at Richmond. Logano became the sixth driver to win in his 300th start. However, Logano's car was discovered to have a rear suspension issue, forcing NASCAR to declare his victory an "encumbered" win; as a result, while his win was not stripped, it did not allow him to lock a spot into the playoffs.

At Kansas on May 13, Logano entered sixth in points. He had a rough race that saw him fall from second on the start to mid-pack. Logano battled setbacks such as a speeding penalty and a cut tire, which caused him to stay mid-pack for the rest of his race. Logano was charging towards the top ten when his car's brakes broke, causing him to crash into Danica Patrick and cause a fiery accident. The accident led to Aric Almirola being injured and airlifted to a local hospital for evaluation. Logano was visibly shaken following the wreck in a post-race interview. His contention to make it to the playoffs immediately started to fade away. His best finishes after Richmond were third at Michigan and his fourth-place finish at Indianapolis.

After a series of bad races, Logano missed the playoffs by one spot, finishing behind Kyle Larson after having finished second at Richmond. This is the first time Logano missed the playoffs since his last year with Joe Gibbs Racing in 2012. Due to his encumbered win, Logano's chance at a championship ended with his runner-up finish, as after Darlington, he was in a must-win situation since the maximum points available in a race were sixty points, as Logano was more than that many points away, and points didn't matter anymore to make the playoffs. Ironically, the driver who benefited from Logano's misfortune was Matt Kenseth, who barely made the playoffs by only about 100 points over Logano, keeping Logano out of the playoffs, reminiscent of their 2015–2016 feud. He then had consistent finishes like his seventh at Chicagoland Speedway, and fourth at Talladega. He finished the season with a 6th-place finish at Homestead-Miami Speedway. He finished the season seventeenth in the points standings.

===== 2018: Championship redemption =====
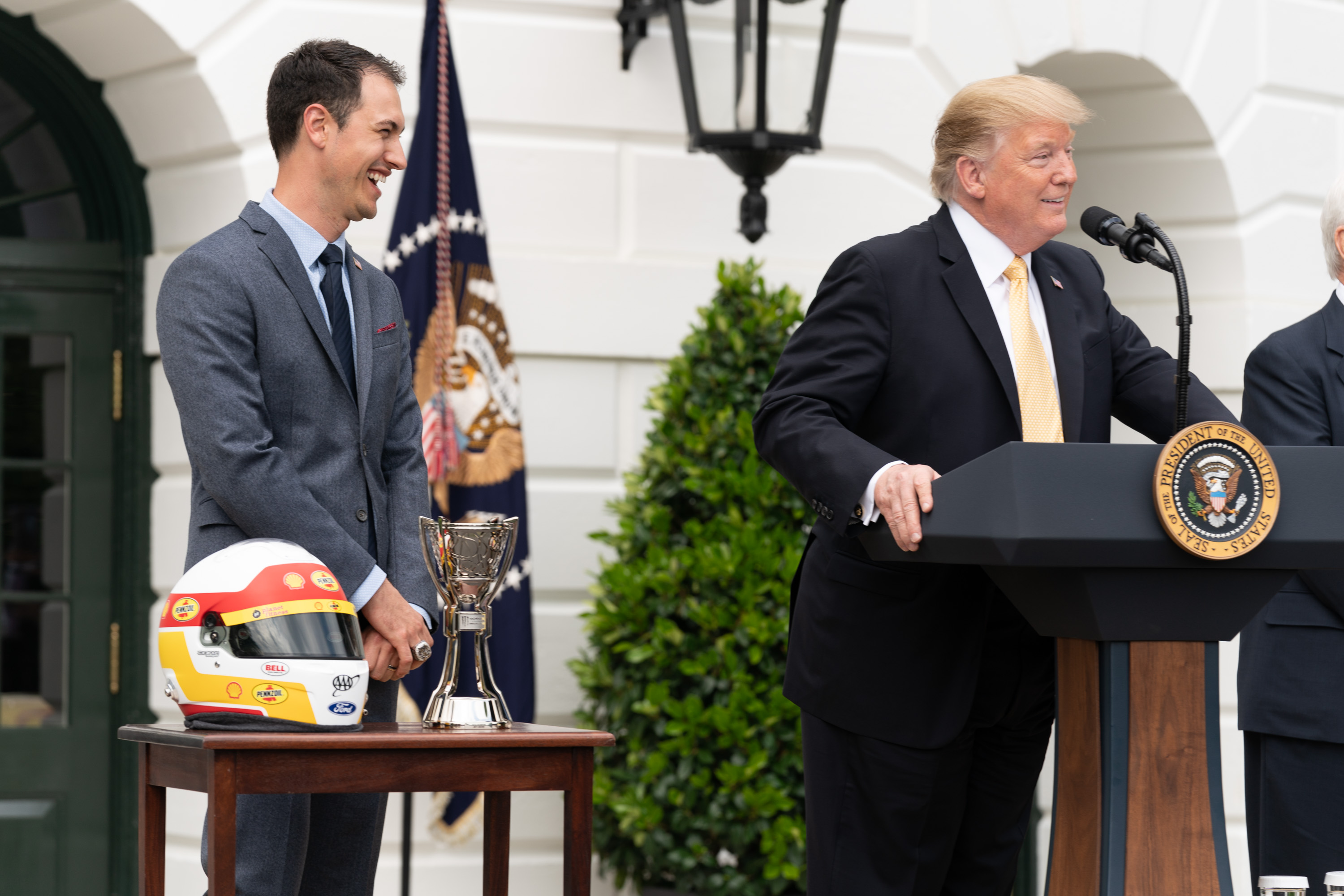
Logano with President Donald Trump on the White House south lawn in 2019

2018 was a quiet but productive year for Logano. Logano started the season with a second-place finish in the Clash. He followed that up with a second-place finish in his duel, losing to teammate Ryan Blaney. Logano had his ups and downs at the 2018 Daytona 500 with a tire rub and a pit penalty, but rebounded to finish fourth after avoiding a wreck with two laps left. At the 2018 GEICO 500, he held off Kurt Busch to win the race and lock him in the Playoffs.

While the "Big Three" were making all the noise, Logano was quietly and patiently posting one of his best-ever seasons. He had finished every race up until the second Daytona race, where he was involved in one of the pile-ups triggered by Ricky Stenhouse Jr.. Then weeks later, he finished in last place for only the second time in his career at Watkins Glen. On the opening laps, Logano was battling for position inside the top five when the leaders stacked up, and Logano made contact with the rear of Kyle Larson's No. 42. The damage resulted in a cracked radiator, eliminating the team from the race. The rest of the regular season was filled with Top 10 finishes. He ended the regular season sixth in points heading into the playoffs.

Logano started off the playoffs with a strong fourth-place finish at Las Vegas. Richmond, however, was a quiet race, but he ended it a lap down, finishing 14th. A quiet race at Charlotte ended in a 10th-place finish and advanced to the next round. He started the Round of 12 by finishing third at Dover and fifth at Talladega. He became the evident flag bearer for his team. After the Kansas playoff race, Logano became the sole Penske driver in the Round of 8 of the Playoffs after teammates Keselowski and Blaney were eliminated. Entering round 8, Logano had a good chance to make it to Homestead and win the championship. He won the fall Martinsville race after a fierce battle with Martin Truex Jr. towards the finish line and secured his spot in the Championship 4. Logano had dominated the event, leading 309 of 500 laps, taking home his first grandfather clock.

He then made a consecutive streak of top tens with a third-place finish at Texas. Logano had a bad weekend at Phoenix, but prior to the press, he felt that he was the favorite for the championship, he suffered a flat tire in the second stage of the race which ended his race, and his sixth-consecutive Top 10 finishes, although he still advanced, even if he had finished second to fifth, in which he would have won a tiebreaker over Chase Elliott if he finished fifth.

As the sun fell and the lights came on, Logano won at Homestead and became the champion after passing Martin Truex Jr. on the high side with 12 laps to go.

Rounding out a stout season, in addition to his first title, he ended the season scoring three wins, thirteen top-five finishes, 26 top-ten finishes, and an average finish of 10.7.

===== 2019: Title defense =====
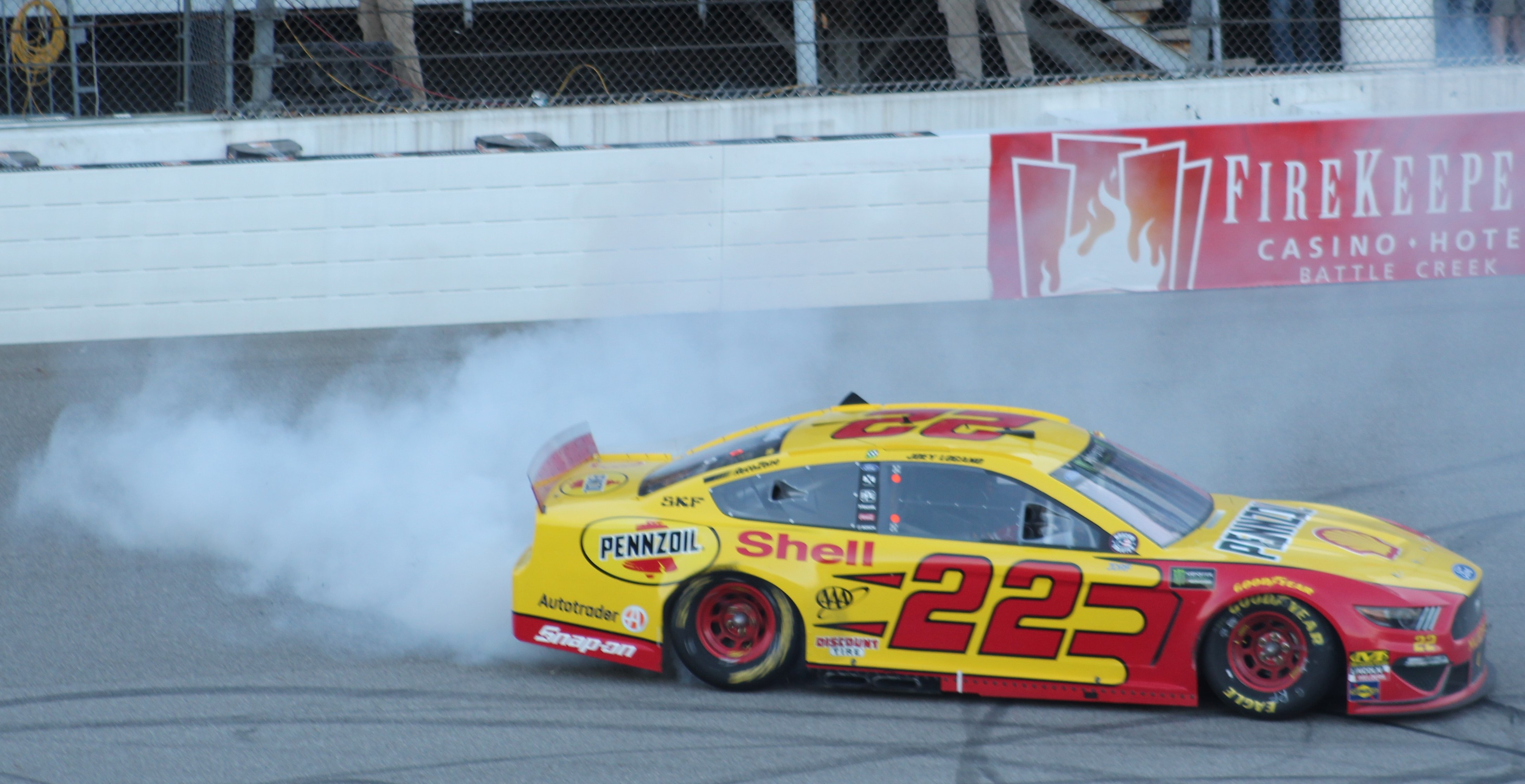
Logano after winning the 2019 FireKeepers Casino 400

Logano started the season with a third-place finish in the rain-delayed Clash. In the duel, he made a big move on Clint Bowyer, who led 41 laps on the final lap, and won the duel, only leading one lap, the last one. He started fourth at the Daytona, starting the season as a strong contender for the championship. Logano battled back and forth for the win all day, such as avoiding "The Big One" that took out 21 other drivers, but came up short with a 1-2-3 finish with the Joe Gibbs Racing team. After the race, Logano confronted fellow Ford teammate Michael McDowell for not giving Logano the push he needed for the win. He left Daytona second in points and tied for the points lead with Denny Hamlin. At qualifying at Atlanta, he had problems in his qualifying laps and started 27th. The problems continued through the race. While he did contend for the win late, he suffered from tire issues to finish 23rd.

Logano rebounded at Las Vegas, holding off teammate Brad Keselowski for his first win at the track. The win at Vegas was fitting as it would be Logano's 22nd spring race in Las Vegas, his 22nd Cup win, and he won in a Pennzoil-sponsored No. 22 car. Logano followed up his win with a tenth-place run at Phoenix and a runner-up finish at Fontana.

At Martinsville, Logano scored his fifth pole in seven races, making it the 10th consecutive season in which he has won a pole. It was a rough go at the start of the race. He led the first five laps and didn't lead the race again. He started on the pole and finished nineteenth. It was not the result that the 22 team wanted. Afterward at Texas, he won Stage 1, but pit lane issues saw him lose positions and drop to a finish of 17th. At Bristol, he had a car capable of winning, but he pitted late in the race and restarted a few spots from where he finished. He finished third, eventually behind the Busch brothers, Kyle and Kurt. Late in the day at Richmond, having won Stage 2 and finished second at Stage 1, Logano had the better car and was chasing Martin Truex Jr. Unfortunately, he didn't have enough time to pass Truex and finished second. At Talladega, he had another good qualifying. He started fifth and led by lap 182. He led at the restart but was no match for the pack of Chevrolet Camaros of Chase Elliott, Bowman, and rookie Ryan Preece, and ended up finishing fourth.

Logano then qualified 4th at Dover. He won Stage 1 ahead of teammate Keselowski. He finished seventh, extending his stretch of Top 10 finishes to four. In the standings, though, he is second, five points behind leader Kyle Busch after having decreased it since Richmond. Logano qualified twentieth at Kansas but failed pre-race inspection, so he started 30th. During the first ten laps, Logano had already gained about 10 spots. He finished tenth in the first stage and finished fifteenth, one lap down; however, though Kyle Busch, the points leader after Dover, finished 30th, and as a result, Logano took the lead in points.

With his two wins, Logano made his way into the playoffs. At the Charlotte Roval, he overcame a collision with a tire barrier to finish tenth and advance to the Round of 12. At Dover, Logano was forced to head to the garage before the opening laps to have a busted rear axle fixed. He returned to the race 24 laps down and was criticized by Denny Hamlin for racing the lead cars hard. At Martinsville, Hamlin collided with Logano on turn four, squeezing Logano into the outside wall and causing him to lose a tire and spin out two laps later. Despite the damage, Logano finished eighth. After the race, Logano and Hamlin discussed the incident before Logano slapped Hamlin's right shoulder, sparking a fight between the two. NASCAR suspended Dave Nichols Jr., the No. 22 team's tire technician, for one race for pulling Hamlin down to the ground during the altercation. Logano's Title defense ended after being eliminated in the Round of 8 despite finishing ninth at Phoenix, with Hamlin and eventual Champion Kyle Busch ultimately beating him out for the remaining Championship 4 spots by winning the race and finishing 2nd respectively. At Homestead, Logano finished fifth in the race and the final points standings, the highest in points among non-Championship 4 drivers. Logano also was running at the finish in every single race in 2019, alongside Ty Dillon as the only two to accomplish the feat.

===== 2020: Return to the Championship 4 =====
With Paul Wolfe replacing Todd Gordon as his crew chief, Logano started the 2020 season by winning Duel 1 of the Bluegreen Vacations Duels. He finished 26th at the Daytona 500 due to a collision with Ross Chastain. A week later, he rebounded with a win at Las Vegas later, Logano would find himself in victory lane at Phoenix. At Bristol, Logano held the lead in a battle with Chase Elliott in the final laps until both competitors crashed into the wall, leaving Logano's teammate Brad Keselowski to win the race while Logano finished 21st. Logano's two wins earned him a spot in the 2020 Playoffs. He locked himself in the Championship 4 after beating Kevin Harvick at Kansas. In the championship race at Phoenix Raceway, he ran upfront for all of stage 1. A late-race vibration and pit strategy caused him to finish third in the race and third in the Championship 4.

===== 2021: Dirt win =====
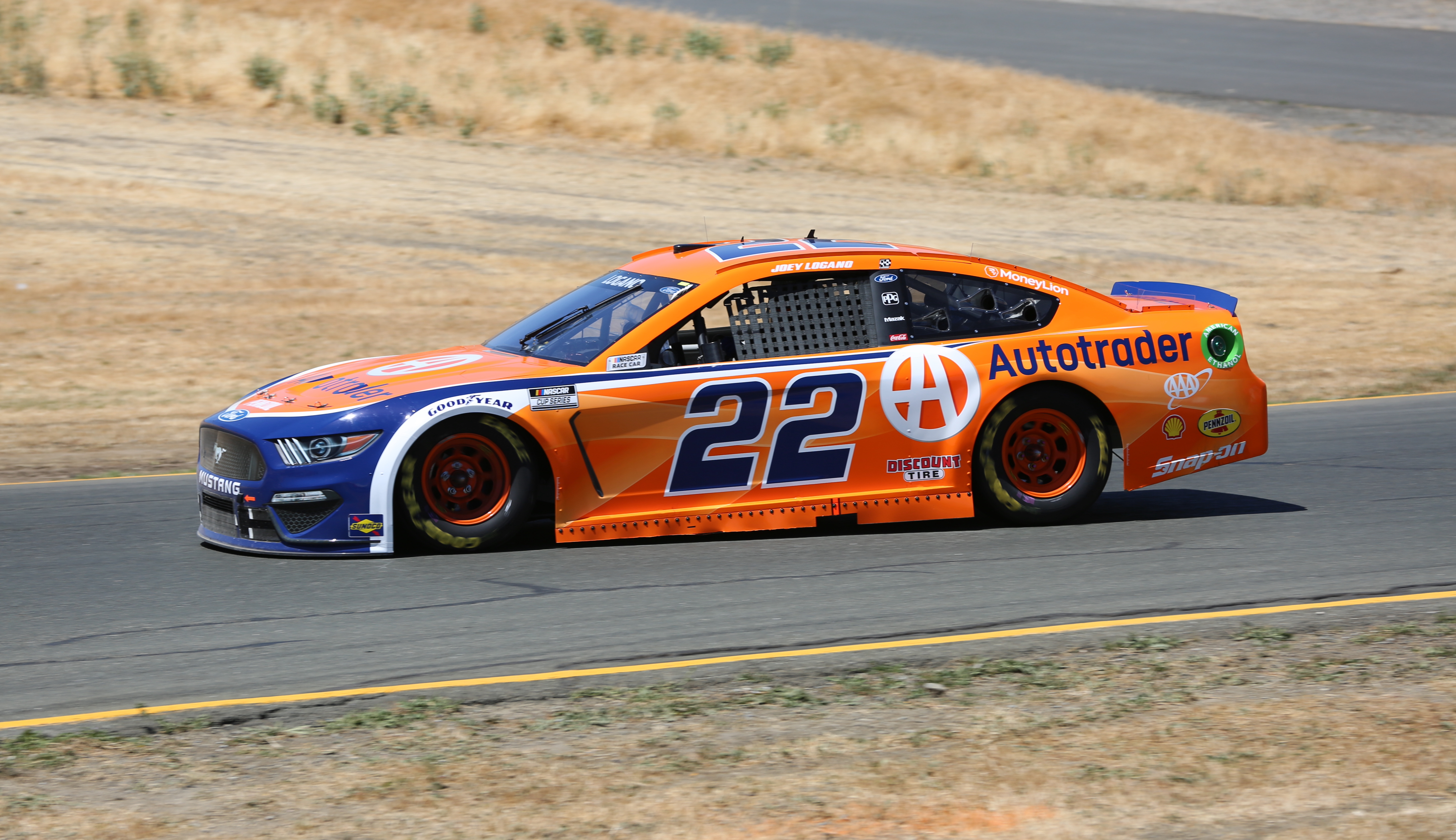
Logano racing at Sonoma Raceway in 2021

On the final lap of the 2021 Daytona 500, Logano led teammate Keselowski before he attempted to pass Logano with momentum from Michael McDowell, resulting in a fiery crash. While McDowell avoided the wreck to win, Logano finished twelfth. Later, he would win the inaugural Bristol Dirt race.

While running third at the end of Stage 1 during the GEICO 500, Logano was turned by Hamlin and clipped in the left rear by Stenhouse Jr., sending his car into a blow, and Logano went upside down before his car rolled back over. He was uninjured, but showed displeasure with NASCAR over safety concerns and the package in his interview, bringing up Ryan Newman's accident at the Daytona 500 the previous year.

Logano got into the playoffs with his Bristol win. He made it all the way to Round 8 before being eliminated after Martinsville. He finished the season eighth in the points standings.

===== 2022: Second championship =====
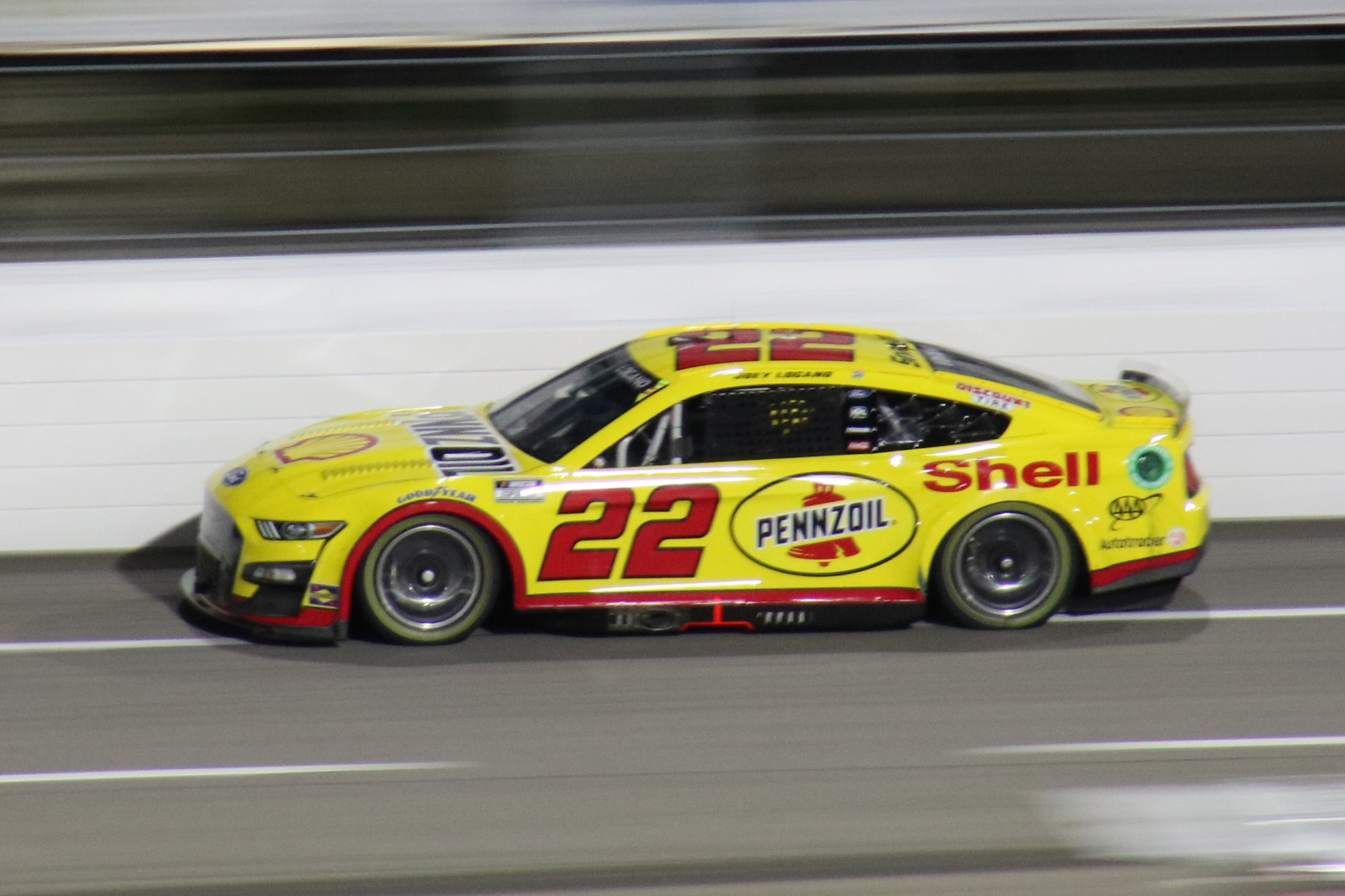
Joey Logano racing at Martinsville in 2022

Logano began the 2022 season by winning the 2022 Busch Light Clash at The Coliseum. He scored his first win of the season at Darlington by retaliating William Byron with two laps to go, infuriating both Byron and the crowd. Logano scored his second win of the season at the inaugural Gateway. During the playoffs, he won at Las Vegas to make the Championship 4, before winning at Phoenix to claim his second Cup Series championship. Later on Logano paid tribute to his former boss at Joe Gibbs Racing Coy Gibbs who had died the day before Logano lifted his trophy.

===== 2023: Second title defense, early playoff exit =====
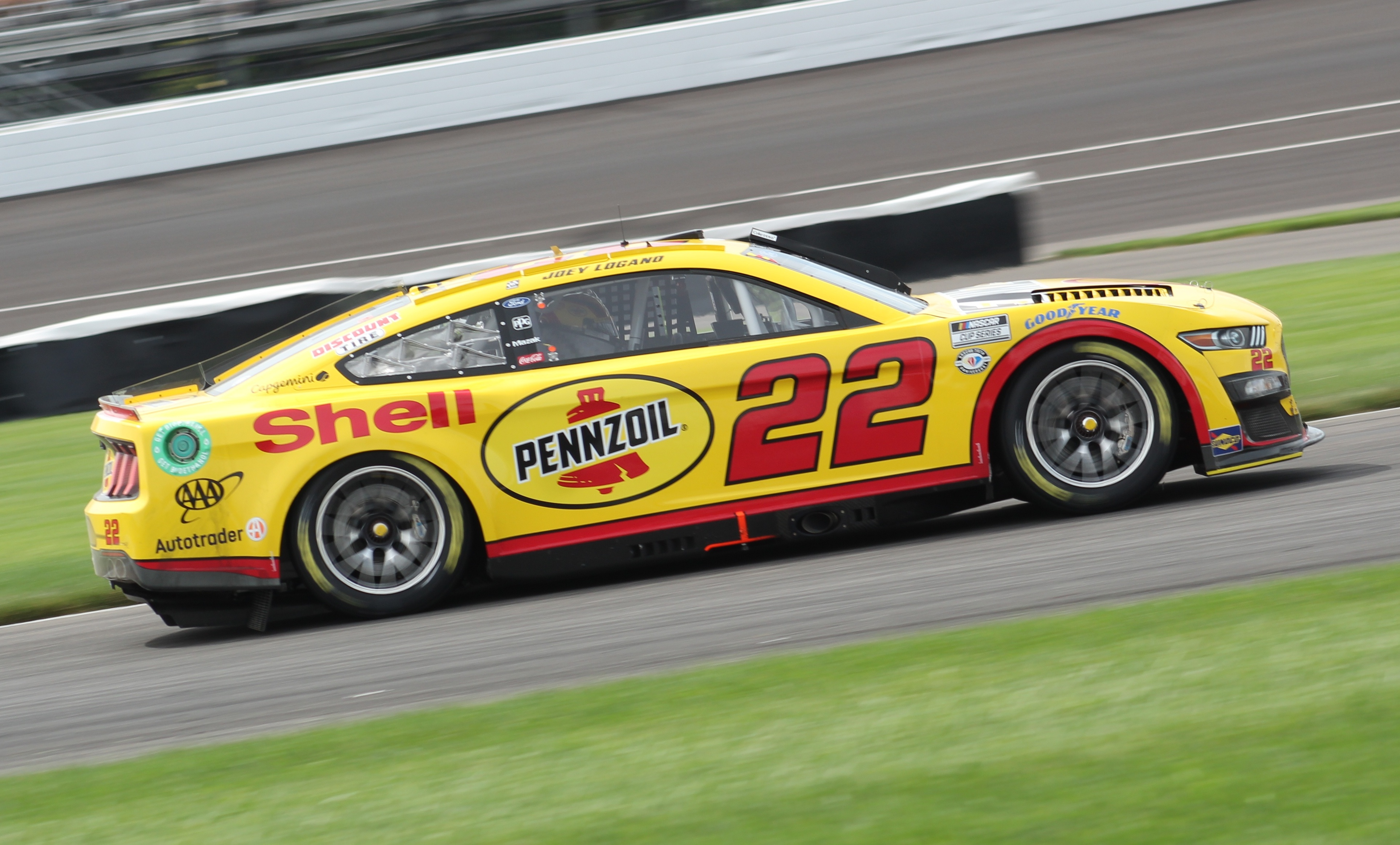
Logano racing at Indianapolis Motor Speedway in 2023

Logano started the 2023 season with a second-place finish at the 2023 Daytona 500. He scored his first win of the season at Atlanta, passing Brad Keselowski on the final lap. During the playoffs, Logano was eliminated at the conclusion of the Round of 16 at Bristol after being caught in a wreck involving Corey LaJoie, Ryan Newman, Justin Haley, and Kevin Harvick. He finished the year twelfth in points, having scored eleven top-fives, whilst Penske continued its championship streak with Ryan Blaney.

===== 2024: Third championship =====
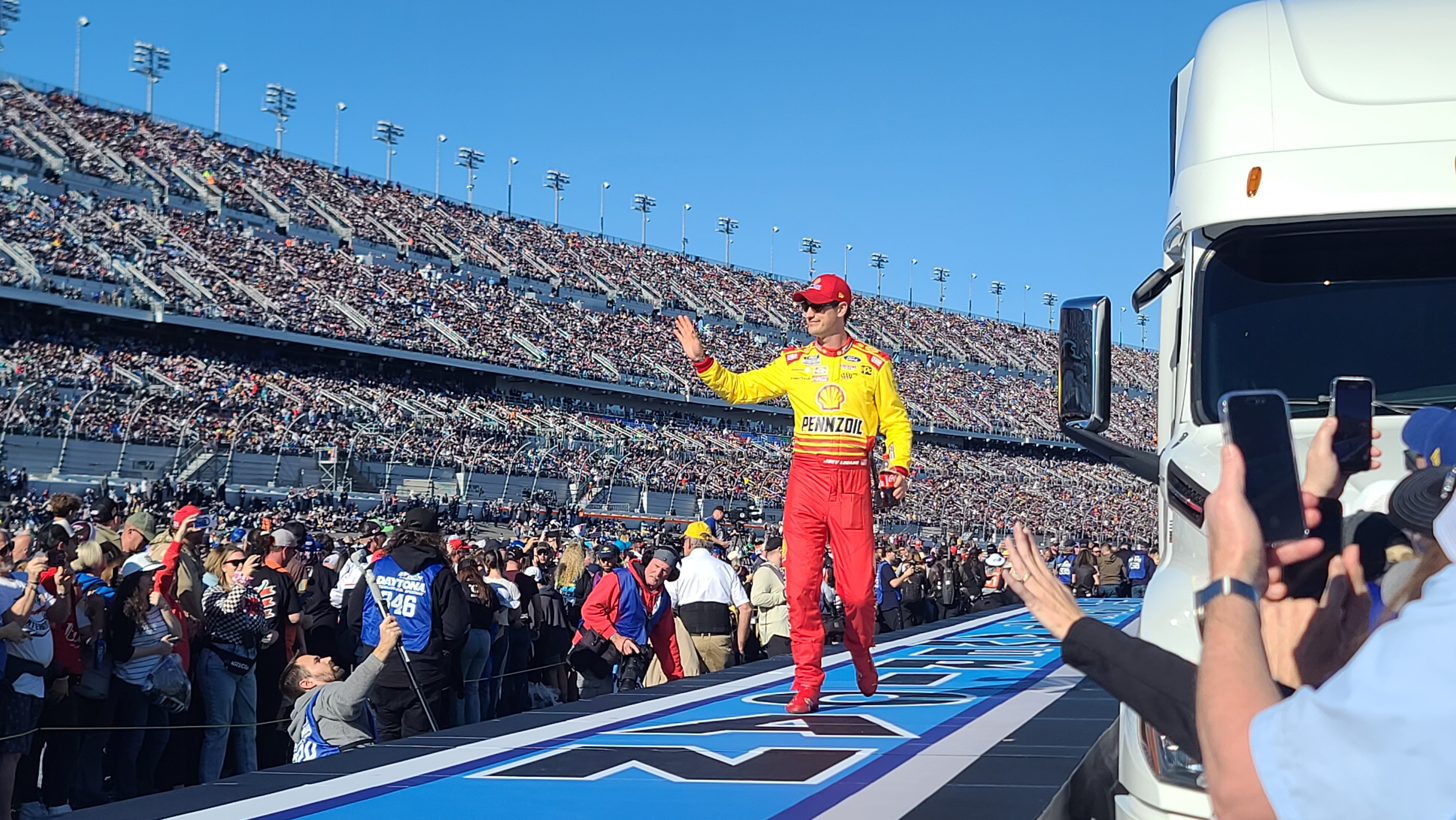
Team Penske racing's Joey Logano is introduced at the 2024 Daytona 500

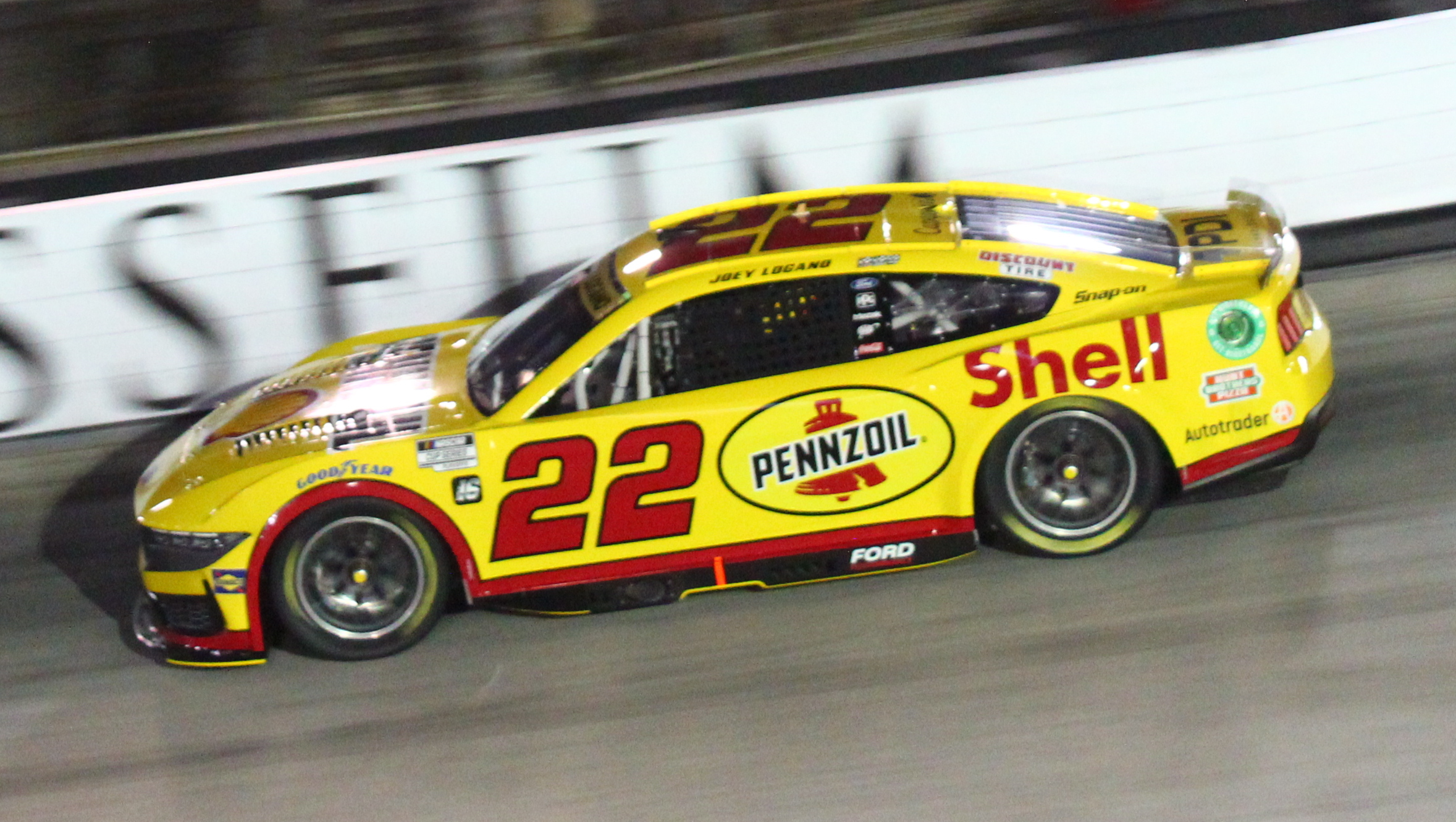
Logano racing at Bristol Motor Speedway in 2024

Logano began the 2024 season with a pole in the Daytona 500, the first for Roger Penske. This was followed by a 32nd-place DNF at the 2024 Daytona 500. A week later, at the Atlanta race, he served a pass-through penalty for wearing unapproved safety gloves during qualifying, for which he was later fined US$10,000. Having scored just one top-five with a second place at Richmond up to that point, Logano won the NASCAR All-Star Race and US$1 million after leading 199 of the exhibition race's 200 laps. Logano scored his first points-paying win of the season at Nashville, after surviving a record five overtimes and going 110 laps without a stop for fuel. He also had the chance to win at Richmond, having taken the lead from Austin Dillon at the overtime restart, but he was spun out by the RCR driver on the final lap. Logano was later fined US$50,000 when he spun his tires near the No. 3 pit box, nearly hitting members of Dillon's family in the process. At the end of the regular season Logano was seeded ninth in the playoffs with a total of four top 5 finishes.

During the playoffs, Logano won the Round-of-16-opener at Atlanta to advance to the Round of 12. There, a retirement at Talladega following 'the big one' contributed to his elimination by four points. However, the disqualification of Alex Bowman from the Roval race promoted Logano to the Round of 8. Logano won at Las Vegas due to a fuel-saving run and a late overtake on Daniel Suárez to lock himself into the Championship 4. After winning Stage 1 and making a three-wide pass for the lead during a Stage 3 restart at Phoenix, Logano held off teammate Ryan Blaney to win his third championship. Logano's title was criticized as his average finish of 17.1 was the lowest of all Cup Series champions up to that point.

===== 2025: Third title defense =====
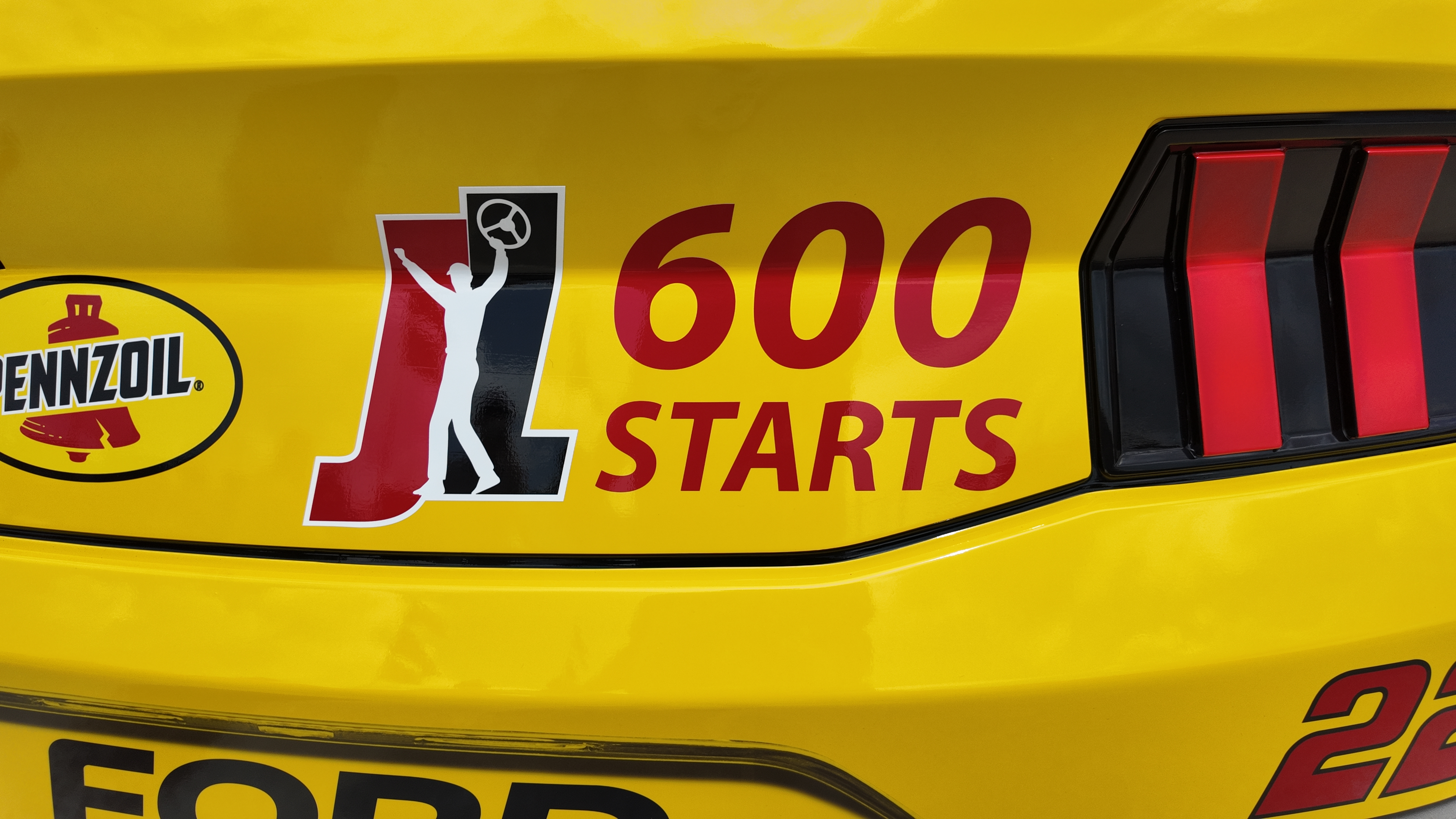
Logano's Mustang with the 600th Cup Series race logo on the rear of the car at Dover Motor Speedway, July 20, 2025

Logano started the 2025 season with a 35th-place DNF at the 2025 Daytona 500. At Talladega, he finished fifth, but was disqualified after post-race inspection revealed the spoiler was missing a bolt. Logano rebounded a week later, with a win at Texas. Logano ran his 600th Cup Series race at Dover on July 20, 2025. Logano end up finish the season in 7th in points standing after being eliminated in the conclusion of Round of 8.

===== 2026: Return to winning ways =====
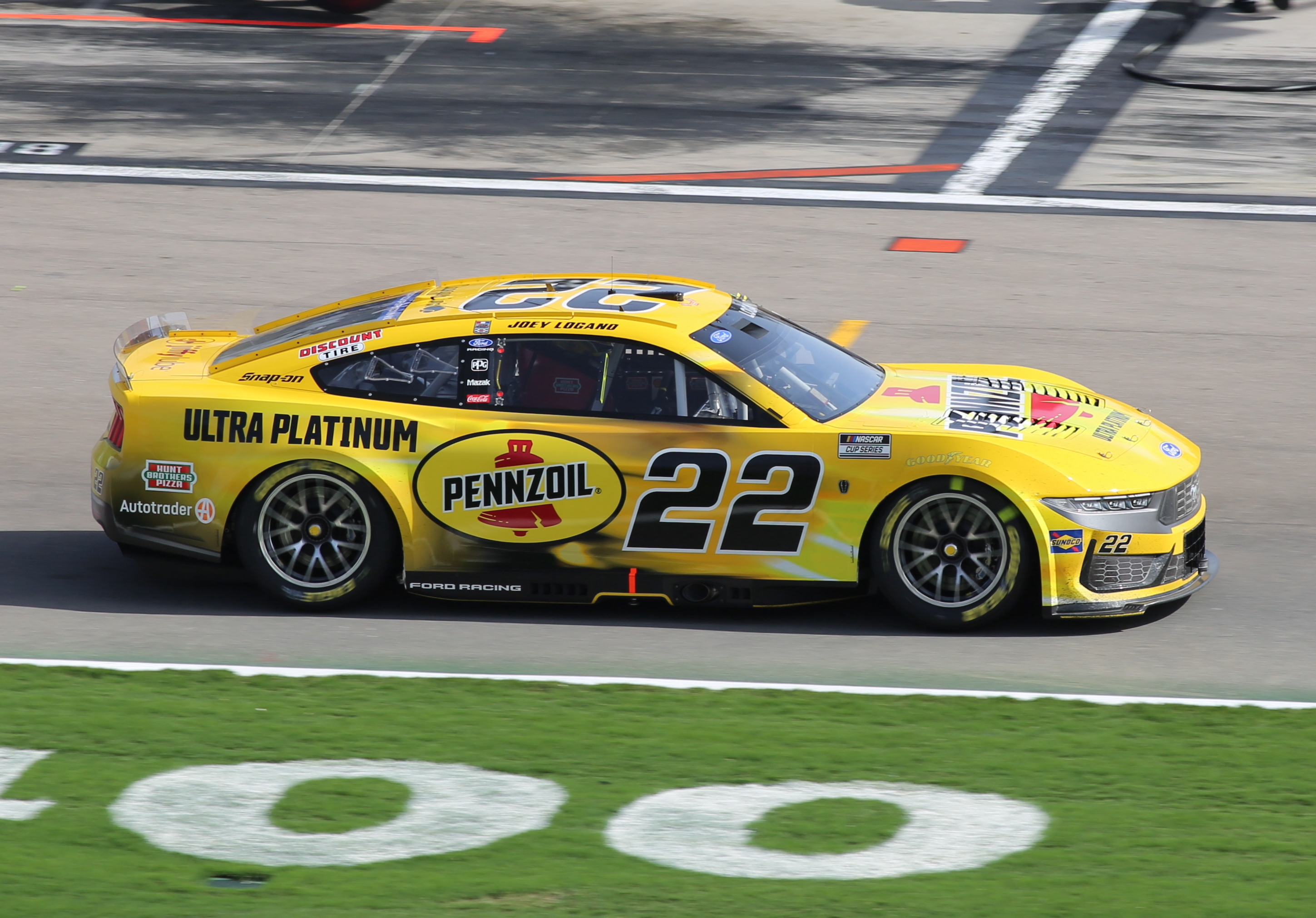
Logano's No. 22 Ford at Las Vegas Motor Speedway in 2026.

Logano started the 2026 season with a 3rd-place finish at the 2026 Daytona 500. At Atlanta, Logano broke Richard Petty's record for leading a lap at the most consecutive drafting-track races, which had been held for 47 years. At North Wilkesboro, Logano broke a 45-race winless streak by winning the first points-paying race at the track since 1996. He would win his second race of the season at Richmond, and would enter the rebrand chase as the 9th seed. In the chase, Logano would steal the win at Bristol after Ty Gibbs and Carson Hocevar washed up the track battling for the lead. Logano flipped a Cup car for the third time in his career at the fall Talladega race and emerged unharmed.

== Even Year Logano ==
Even Year Logano
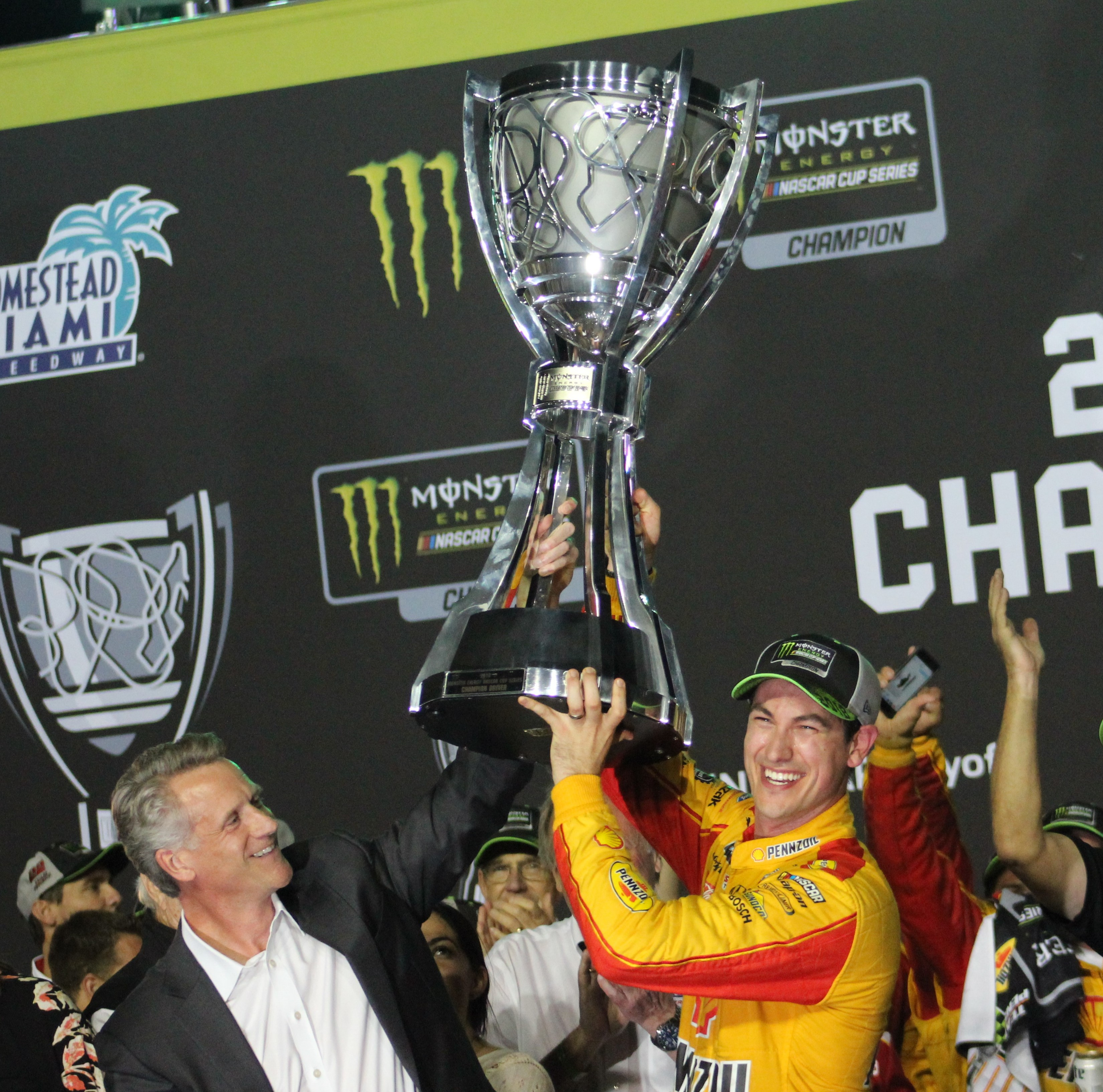
- Logano after winning his first NASCAR Cup Series title in 2018.
- Origin: October 28, 2018 social media post on Twitter from IndyCar editor Eric Smith

External videos
- Video Essay on Even Year Logano, by Elly Productions, published November 9, 2024.

=== Beginnings; 2018–2022 ===
==== 2018 ====
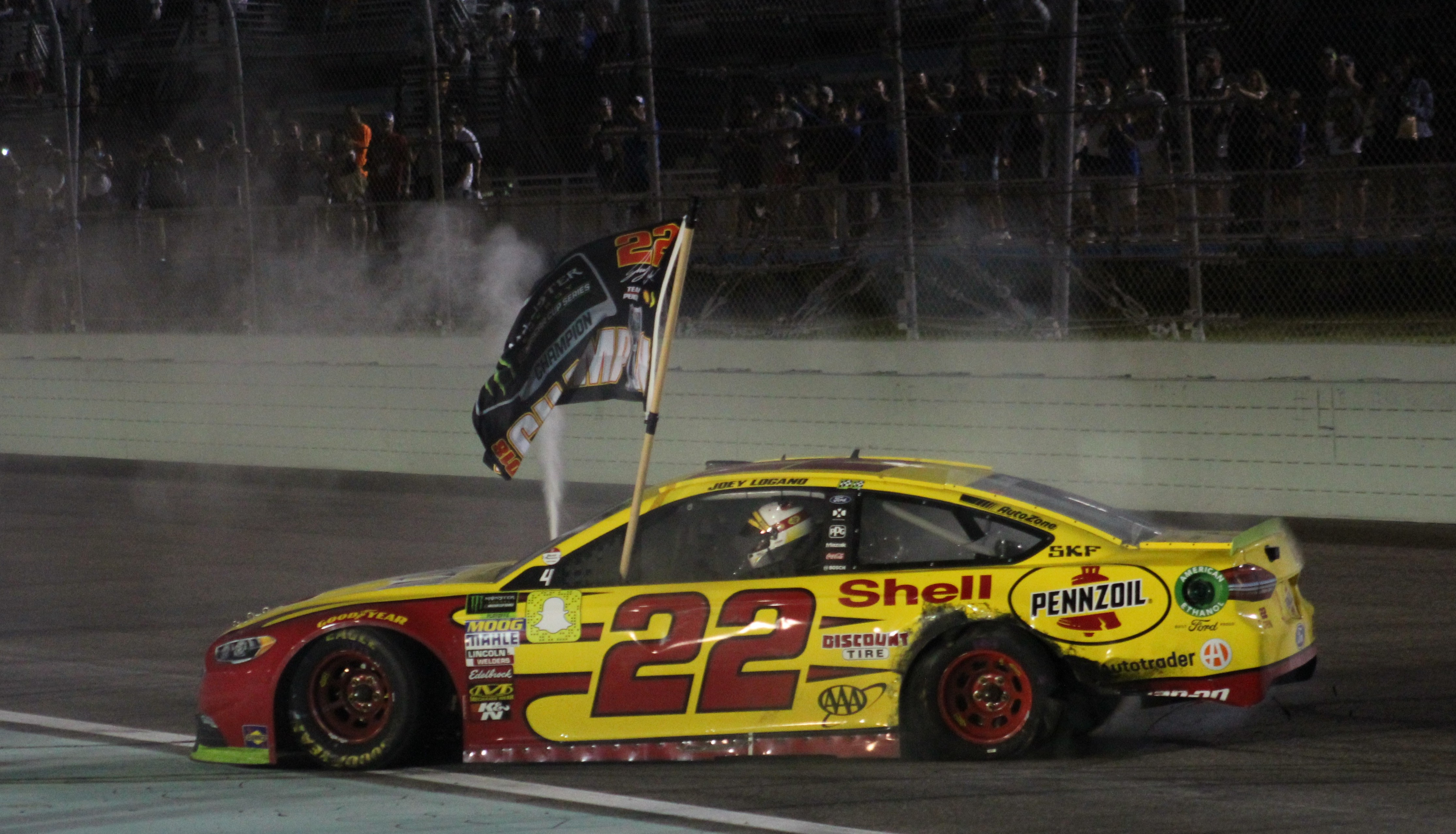
Logano after winning his first championship at Homestead in 2018.

The first known reference made to it came on October 28, 2018 when lead editor for IndyCar, Eric Smith, would note that Logano made the Championship 4 in every single even numbered year up that point, those being in 2014, 2016, and that year in a Twitter post. The win that day would punch Logano's ticket into the Championship 4 at Homestead. Logano would follow that up by winning at Homestead, earning his first career Cup Series title.

==== 2020 ====
In 2020 Logano would once again make the Championship 4, with a win at Kansas in the Round of 8. He would ultimately fall short of the title, finishing the race in 3rd, 3rd in points.

==== 2022 ====
Logano would win the championship that season after clinching his spot in the Championship 4, with a win at Las Vegas in the Round of 8.

=== Widespread; 2024–present ===
==== 2024 ====
Logano would have been eliminated from the playoffs in the Round of 12 after the race at the Charlotte Motor Speedway Roval, but Alex Bowman, who had originally moved on to the Round of 8 due to an 18th-place result, was found to be 17 pounds underweight and was disqualified, moving Joey into the next round. Logano went on to win at Las Vegas, clinching a spot in the Championship 4, and at Phoenix, winning his third title. His 2024 championship came under scrutiny due to his average finish of 17.1.

== Personal life ==
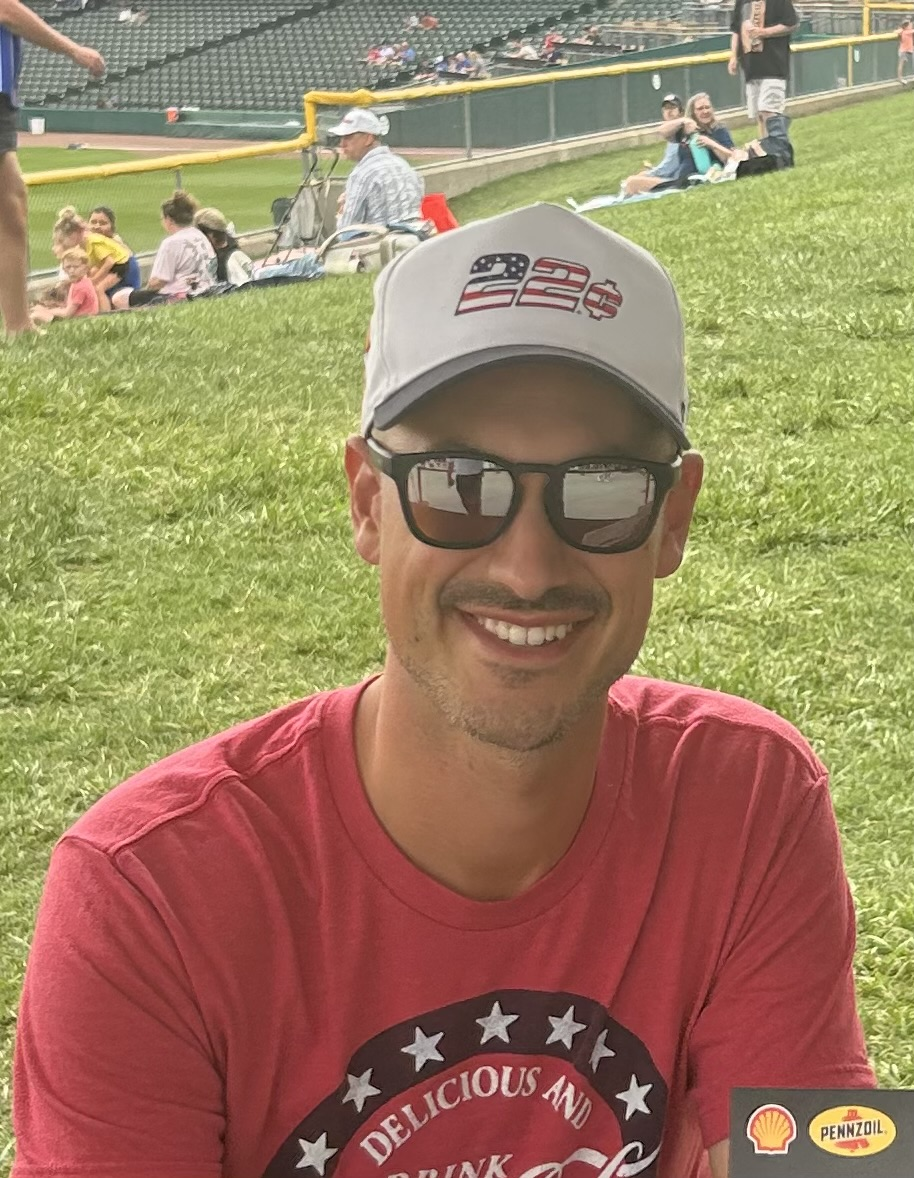
Logano at Victory Field in 2026.

Logano was born in Middletown, Connecticut, the son of Deborah B. and Thomas J. Logano. His father Thomas is of Italian ancestry. As a child, he also played ice hockey in addition to racing. They initially lived in Portland near the Connecticut River and eventually moved to Georgia to further his racing career. As he started his career, Former NASCAR Cup Series driver Randy LaJoie gave him the nickname 'Sliced Bread', because he thought that he would be one of the best stock car drivers ever.

On November 13, 2013, Joey Logano announced his engagement to his childhood sweetheart, Brittany Baca. The couple married on December 13, 2014, and they have three children together.

In September 2019, Logano was diagnosed with Alopecia areata, an autoimmune disorder that attacks hair follicles. While the disease does not cause any health risks or physical effects, it does lead to patches of thinning hair or baldness, which Logano has often joked about. In December 2022, after winning his second NASCAR Cup Series Championship, Logano received hair treatment, sporting it in a Twitter post.

=== Other media appearances ===
In October 2009, Logano co-hosted an episode of WWE Raw with Kyle Busch.

Logano has made cameo appearances in various TV shows. He appeared in Cartoon Network's Destroy Build Destroy in the episode "NASCAR Pile-Up Logano vs. Edwards", where he would beat Carl Edwards. The episode aired on October 20, 2010. In 2011, along with Carl Edwards and other NASCAR drivers, he was in the A&E series The Glades. During the year, he also participated in Man v. Food Nation, taking on the Atomic Bomb Challenge at Sticky Lips BBQ in Rochester, New York. He lost the challenge.

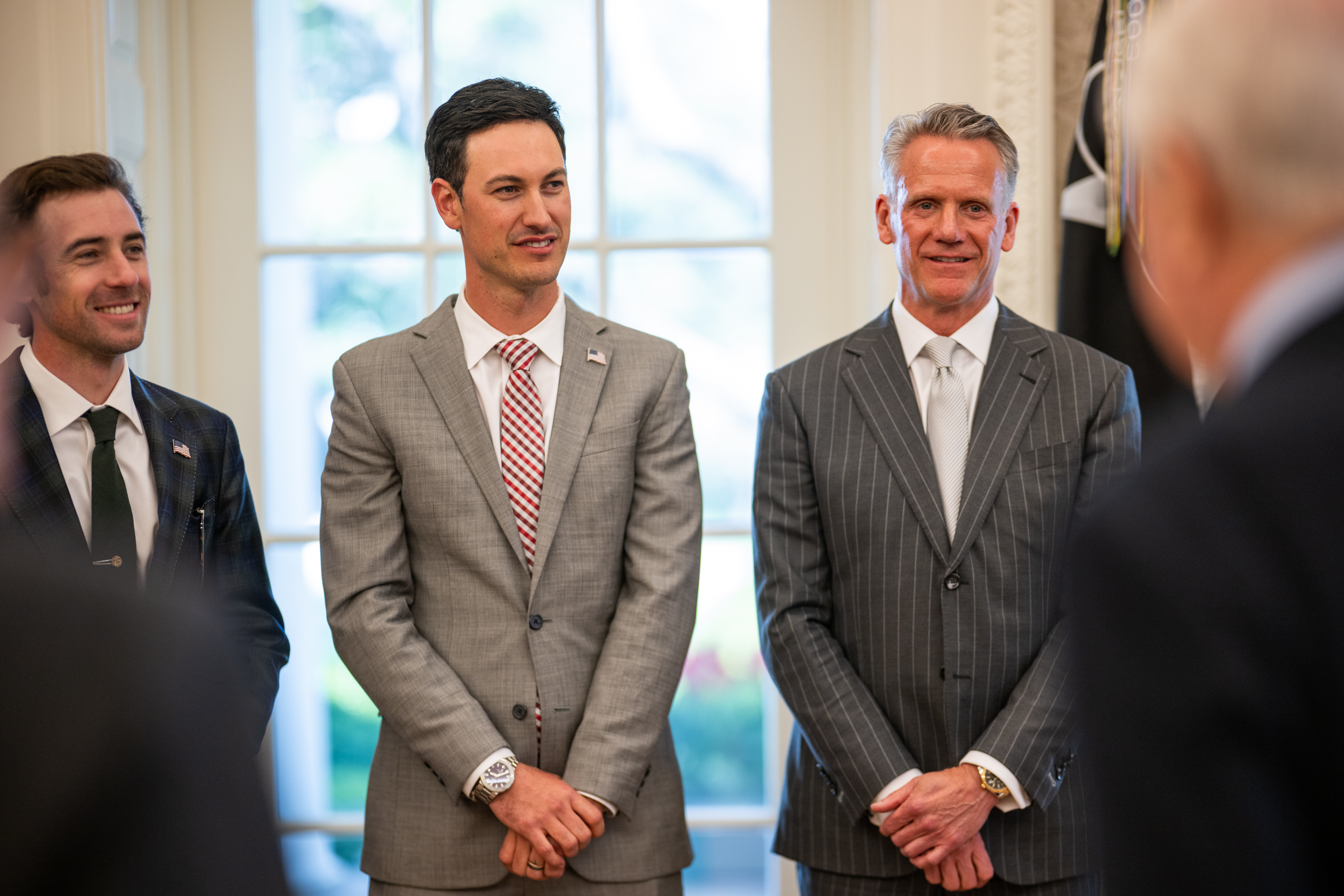
Joey Logano in The White House on April 9, 2025

During its 2011 season, Logano and Trevor Bayne were on a live portion of American Idol. In 2013, Logano guest-starred on a season two episode of Disney XD's Lab Rats.

Logano appeared on an episode of the American reality television series Pawn Stars where he inspected a Mustang GT alongside Rick Harrison.

Logano, along with Penske teammate Brad Keselowski, appeared in the movie Sharknado 3: Oh Hell No!. He also had a cameo appearance as a security guard in the 2017 film Logan Lucky.

In October 2015, he appeared on 60 Minutes alongside a Make-A-Wish Child who wanted to meet him, Gavin Grubbs. The two speak about the Make-A-Wish Foundation's granting of Gavin's wish.

In 2016, Logano was a Fox NASCAR guest analyst for the Xfinity Series races at Phoenix and Richmond. A year later, Logano was a color commentator for the Fox broadcast of the Xfinity race at Pocono. Part of a Cup drivers-only coverage, he worked alongside Kevin Harvick and Clint Bowyer in the broadcast booth. In 2024, Logano commented alongside fellow Cup Series driver Daniel Suárez at the Xfinity Series race at Phoenix on the FOX broadcast.

On April 30, 2019, Logano was invited to the White House in Washington D.C. by U.S. President Donald Trump.

=== Philanthropy ===
In March 2020, the Joey Logano Foundation partnered with Bobbee O's BBQ in Charlotte, North Carolina, to offer free meals to children during the COVID-19 lockdown.

== Motorsports career results ==
=== Stock car career summary ===
Season	Series	Team	Races	Wins	Top 5	Top 10	Points	Position
2007	NASCAR Busch East Series	Joe Gibbs Racing	13	5	10	10	2123	**1st**
2007	NASCAR West Series	Joe Gibbs Racing	2	1	1	1	262	38th
2008	NASCAR Cup Series	Joe Gibbs Racing	1	0	0	0	113	64th
2008	NASCAR Cup Series	Hall of Fame Racing	2	0	0	0	113	64th
2008	NASCAR Nationwide Series	Joe Gibbs Racing	19	1	5	14	2555	20th
2008	NASCAR Craftsman Truck Series	HT Motorsports	1	0	0	0	85	91st
2008	ARCA Re/Max Series	Venturini Motorsports	2	1	2	2	475	56th
2009	NASCAR Cup Series	Joe Gibbs Racing	36	1	3	7	3791	20th
2009	NASCAR Nationwide Series	Joe Gibbs Racing	22	5	13	16	3371	14th
2009	NASCAR Camping World West Series	Joe Gibbs Racing	1	0	0	0	122	57th
2009	ARCA Re/Max Series	Venturini Motorsports	2	1	2	2	460	64th
2010	NASCAR Cup Series	Joe Gibbs Racing	36	0	7	16	4185	16th
2010	NASCAR Nationwide Series	Joe Gibbs Racing	25	2	15	24	4038	8th
2011	NASCAR Cup Series	Joe Gibbs Racing	36	0	4	6	902	24th
2011	NASCAR Nationwide Series	Joe Gibbs Racing	22	1	8	15	0	NC†
2011	NASCAR K&N Pro Series West	Joe Gibbs Racing	1	1	1	1	190	60th
2012	NASCAR Cup Series	Joe Gibbs Racing	36	1	2	12	965	17th
2012	NASCAR Nationwide Series	Joe Gibbs Racing	22	9	12	17	0	NC†
2013	NASCAR Cup Series	Penske Racing	36	1	11	19	2323	8th
2013	NASCAR Nationwide Series	Penske Racing	15	3	8	12	0	NC†
2013	NASCAR Camping World Truck Series	Brad Keselowski Racing	3	0	2	2	0	NC†
2014	NASCAR Cup Series	Team Penske	36	5	16	22	5028	4th
2014	NASCAR Nationwide Series	Team Penske	10	0	8	9	0	NC†
2014	NASCAR Camping World Truck Series	Brad Keselowski Racing	2	0	1	1	0	NC†
2015	NASCAR Cup Series	Team Penske	36	6	22	28	2360	6th
2015	NASCAR Xfinity Series	Team Penske	11	4	8	10	0	NC†
2015	NASCAR Camping World Truck Series	Brad Keselowski Racing	1	1	1	1	0	NC†
2016	NASCAR Cup Series	Team Penske	36	3	16	26	5037	**2nd**
2016	NASCAR Xfinity Series	Team Penske	13	2	7	12	0	NC†
2017	NASCAR Cup Series	Team Penske	36	1	10	17	930	17th
2017	NASCAR Xfinity Series	Team Penske	10	1	6	9	0	NC†
2018	NASCAR Cup Series	Team Penske	36	3	13	26	5040	**1st**
2018	NASCAR Xfinity Series	Team Penske	5	2	4	4	0	NC†
2019	NASCAR Cup Series	Team Penske	36	2	12	21	2380	5th
2019	NASCAR Xfinity Series	Team Penske	2	0	1	1	0	NC†
2020	NASCAR Cup Series	Team Penske	36	3	12	21	5034	**3rd**
2021	NASCAR Cup Series	Team Penske	36	1	10	19	2336	8th
2022	NASCAR Cup Series	Team Penske	36	4	11	17	5040	**1st**
2022	NASCAR Camping World Truck Series	David Gilliland Racing	1	0	0	1	0	NC†
2023	NASCAR Cup Series	Team Penske	36	1	11	17	2258	12th
2023	NASCAR Craftsman Truck Series	ThorSport Racing	1	1	1	1	0	NC†
2024	NASCAR Cup Series	Team Penske	36	4	7	13	5040	**1st**
2024	NASCAR Xfinity Series	AM Racing	3	0	0	2	0	NC†
2025	NASCAR Cup Series	Team Penske	36	1	7	13	2330	7th

^{†} As Logano was a guest driver, he was ineligible for championship points.

=== NASCAR ===
(key) (Bold – Pole position awarded by qualifying time. Italics – Pole position earned by points standings or practice time. * – Most laps led. ** – All laps led.)

==== Cup Series ====
NASCAR Cup Series results
Year	Team	No.	Make	1	2	3	4	5	6	7	8	9	10	11	12	13	14	15	16	17	18	19	20	21	22	23	24	25	26	27	28	29	30	31	32	33	34	35	36	NCSC	Pts	Ref
2008	Joe Gibbs Racing	02	Toyota	DAY	CAL	LVS	ATL	BRI	MAR	TEX	PHO	TAL	RCH	DAR	CLT	DOV	POC	MCH	SON	NHA	DAY	CHI	IND	POC	GLN	MCH	BRI	CAL	RCH; DNQ							ATL; DNQ	TEX; 40	PHO	HOM	64th	113	
2008	Hall of Fame Racing	96	Toyota																											NHA; 32	DOV	KAN; 39	TAL	CLT	MAR					64th	113	
2009	Joe Gibbs Racing	20	Toyota	DAY; 43	CAL; 26	LVS; 13	ATL; 30	BRI; 38	MAR; 32	TEX; 30	PHO; 21	TAL; 9	RCH; 19	DAR; 9	CLT; 9	DOV; 15	POC; 23	MCH; 25	SON; 19	NHA; 1	DAY; 19	CHI; 18	IND; 12	POC; 27	GLN; 16	MCH; 7	BRI; 34	ATL; 22	RCH; 14	NHA; 21	DOV; 42	KAN; 28	CAL; 14	CLT; 5	MAR; 12	TAL; 3	TEX; 19	PHO; 21	HOM; 24	20th	3791	
2010	Joe Gibbs Racing	20	Toyota	DAY; 20	CAL; 5	LVS; 6	ATL; 35	**BRI**; 27	MAR; 2	PHO; 10	TEX; 28	TAL; 36	RCH; 16	DAR; 27	DOV; 10	CLT; 13	POC; 13	MCH; 10	SON; 33	NHA; 9	DAY; 29	CHI; 19	IND; 9	POC; 25	GLN; 33	MCH; 10	BRI; 18	ATL; 27	RCH; 4	NHA; 35	DOV; 3	KAN; 17	CAL; 11	CLT; 7	MAR; 6	TAL; 5	TEX; 4	PHO; 3	HOM; 39	16th	4185	
2011	Joe Gibbs Racing	20	Toyota	DAY; 23	PHO; 33	LVS; 23	BRI; 23	CAL; 25	MAR; 13	TEX; 24	TAL; 10	RCH; 11	DAR; 35	DOV; 27	CLT; 3	KAN; 23	POC; 11	MCH; 18	**SON**; 6	DAY; 3	KEN; 14	NHA; 4	IND; 25	**POC**; 26	GLN; 5	MCH; 21	BRI; 13	ATL; 24	RCH; 35	CHI; 16	NHA; 14	DOV; 29	KAN; 29	CLT; 12	TAL; 24	MAR; 18	TEX; 37	PHO; 11	HOM; 19	24th	902	
2012	Joe Gibbs Racing	20	Toyota	DAY; 9	PHO; 10	LVS; 16	BRI; 16	CAL; 24	MAR; 23	TEX; 19	KAN; 15	RCH; 24	TAL; 26	DAR; 10	CLT; 23	DOV; 8	**POC**; 1*	MCH; 35	SON; 10	KEN; 22	DAY; 4	NHA; 14	IND; 33	POC; 13	GLN; 32	MCH; 31	BRI; 8*	ATL; 18	RCH; 30	CHI; 7	NHA; 8	DOV; 10	TAL; 32	CLT; 9	KAN; 19	MAR; 16	TEX; 11	PHO; 27	**HOM**; 14	17th	965	
2013	Penske Racing	22	Ford	DAY; 19	PHO; 26	LVS; 12	BRI; 17	CAL; 3	MAR; 23	TEX; 5	KAN; 39	RCH; 3	TAL; 35	DAR; 22	CLT; 5	DOV; 7	POC; 10	MCH; 9	SON; 11	KEN; 4	DAY; 40	NHA; 40	IND; 8	POC; 7	GLN; 7	**MCH**; 1*	BRI; 5	ATL; 2*	RCH; 22	**CHI**; 37	NHA; 14	DOV; 3	KAN; 4	CLT; 18	TAL; 16	MAR; 14	TEX; 3	PHO; 9	HOM; 8	8th	2323	
2014	Team Penske	22	Ford	DAY; 11	PHO; 4	**LVS**; 4	BRI; 20	CAL; 39	MAR; 4	TEX; 1*	DAR; 35	RCH; 1	TAL; 32	KAN; 4	CLT; 12	DOV; 8	POC; 40	MCH; 10	SON; 16	KEN; 9	DAY; 17	NHA; 40	IND; 5	POC; 3	GLN; 6	MCH; 3*	BRI; 1	ATL; 14	RCH; 6	CHI; 4	NHA; 1	DOV; 4	KAN; 1*	CLT; 4	TAL; 11	MAR; 5	TEX; 12	PHO; 6	HOM; 16	4th	5028	
2015	Team Penske	22	Ford	DAY; 1	**ATL**; 4	LVS; 10	PHO; 8	CAL; 7	**MAR**; 3	TEX; 4	BRI; 40	**RCH**; 5	TAL; 33	**KAN**; 5	CLT; 13	DOV; 11	POC; 4	MCH; 5	SON; 5	DAY; 22	KEN; 2	NHA; 4	IND; 2	POC; 20*	GLN; 1	MCH; 7	BRI; 1	DAR; 4	**RCH**; 3	CHI; 6	NHA; 3	DOV; 10	CLT; 1*	KAN; 1	TAL; 1	**MAR**; 37*	TEX; 40	PHO; 3	HOM; 4	6th	2360	
2016	Team Penske	22	Ford	DAY; 6	ATL; 12	LVS; 2	PHO; 18	CAL; 4	**MAR**; 11	TEX; 3	BRI; 10	RCH; 8	TAL; 25	KAN; 38	DOV; 22	CLT; 9	POC; 5	**MCH**; 1*	SON; 3	DAY; 4	KEN; 39	NHA; 3	IND; 7	POC; 37*	GLN; 2	BRI; 10	**MCH**; 10	DAR; 5	RCH; 10	CHI; 2	NHA; 11	DOV; 6	CLT; 36	KAN; 3	TAL; 1	MAR; 9	TEX; 2*	PHO; 1	HOM; 4	2nd	5037	
2017	Team Penske	22	Ford	DAY; 6	ATL; 6	LVS; 4	**PHO**; 31	CAL; 5	MAR; 4	TEX; 3	BRI; 5	RCH; 1	TAL; 32	KAN; 37	CLT; 21	DOV; 25	POC; 23	MCH; 3	SON; 12	DAY; 35	KEN; 8	NHA; 37	IND; 4	POC; 27	GLN; 24	MCH; 28	BRI; 13	DAR; 18	RCH; 2	CHI; 7	NHA; 10	DOV; 15	CLT; 26	TAL; 4*	KAN; 21	**MAR**; 24	TEX; 7	PHO; 12	HOM; 6	17th	930	
2018	Team Penske	22	Ford	DAY; 4	ATL; 6	LVS; 7	PHO; 19	CAL; 5	MAR; 6	TEX; 6	BRI; 9	RCH; 4	TAL; 1*	DOV; 13	KAN; 3	CLT; 22	POC; 9	MCH; 7	SON; 19	CHI; 8	DAY; 39	KEN; 10	NHA; 9	POC; 26	GLN; 37	MCH; 10	BRI; 4	DAR; 2	IND; 13	LVS; 4	RCH; 14	ROV; 10	DOV; 3	TAL; 5	**KAN**; 8*	MAR; 1*	TEX; 3	PHO; 37	HOM; 1*	1st	5040	
2019	Team Penske	22	Ford	DAY; 4	ATL; 23	LVS; 1	PHO; 10	CAL; 2	**MAR**; 19	TEX; 17	BRI; 3	RCH; 2	TAL; 4	DOV; 7	KAN; 15	CLT; 2	POC; 7	**MCH**; 1*	SON; 23	CHI; 3	DAY; 25	KEN; 7	NHA; 9	POC; 13	GLN; 23	MCH; 17	BRI; 16	DAR; 14	IND; 2	LVS; 9*	RCH; 11	ROV; 10	DOV; 34	TAL; 11	KAN; 17	MAR; 8	TEX; 4	PHO; 9	HOM; 5	5th	2380	
2020	Team Penske	22	Ford	DAY; 26	LVS; 1	CAL; 12	PHO; 1	DAR; 18	DAR; 6	CLT; 13	CLT; 6	BRI; 21	ATL; 10	MAR; 4*	HOM; 27	TAL; 17	POC; 36	POC; 24	IND; 10	KEN; 15	TEX; 3	KAN; 35	NHA; 4	MCH; 8	MCH; 5	DRC; 9	DOV; 8	DOV; 6	DAY; 27*	DAR; 3	RCH; 3	BRI; 11	LVS; 14	TAL; 26*	ROV; 2	KAN; 1	TEX; 10	MAR; 3	PHO; 3	3rd	5034	
2021	Team Penske	22	Ford	DAY; 12	DRC; 2	HOM; 25	LVS; 9	PHO; 2*	ATL; 15	BRD; 1	MAR; 6	RCH; 3	TAL; 39	KAN; 17	DAR; 13	DOV; 5	COA; 3*	CLT; 17	SON; 4	NSH; 10	POC; 7	POC; 10	ROA; 15	ATL; 19	NHA; 4	GLN; 22	IRC; 34	MCH; 33	DAY; 23*	DAR; 8	RCH; 5	BRI; 11	LVS; 11	TAL; 3	ROV; 7	TEX; 30	KAN; 9	MAR; 10	PHO; 11	8th	2336	
2022	Team Penske	22	Ford	DAY; 21	CAL; 5	LVS; 14	PHO; 8	ATL; 9	COA; 31	RCH; 17	MAR; 2	BRD; 3	TAL; 32	DOV; 29	**DAR**; 1*	KAN; 17	CLT; 20	GTW; 1	SON; 17	NSH; 9	ROA; 27	ATL; 26	NHA; 24	POC; 20	IRC; 6	MCH; 4	RCH; 6*	GLN; 3	DAY; 12	**DAR**; 4	KAN; 17	BRI; 27	TEX; 2	TAL; 27	**ROV**; 18	LVS; 1	HOM; 18	MAR; 6	**PHO**; 1*	1st	5040	
2023	Team Penske	22	Ford	DAY; 2	CAL; 10	**LVS**; 36	PHO; 11	**ATL**; 1*	COA; 28	RCH; 7	BRD; 37	MAR; 2	TAL; 30	DOV; 31	KAN; 6	DAR; 18	CLT; 21	GTW; 3	SON; 3	NSH; 19	CSC; 8	ATL; 17	NHA; 2	POC; 35	RCH; 4	MCH; 14	IRC; 34	GLN; 10	DAY; 5	DAR; 12	KAN; 5	BRI; 34	TEX; 21	TAL; 24*	ROV; 5	LVS; 12	HOM; 8	MAR; 4	PHO; 18	12th	2258	
2024	Team Penske	22	Ford	**DAY**; 32*	ATL; 28	**LVS**; 9	PHO; 34	BRI; 22	COA; 11	RCH; 2	MAR; 6	TEX; 11	TAL; 19	DOV; 16	KAN; 34	DAR; 21	CLT; 14	GTW; 5	**SON**; 21	IOW; 6	NHA; 32	NSH; 1	CSC; 23	POC; 5	IND; 34	RCH; 19	MCH; 33	DAY; 31*	DAR; 8	ATL; 1	GLN; 15	BRI; 28	KAN; 14	TAL; 33	ROV; 8	LVS; 1	HOM; 28	MAR; 10	PHO; 1	1st	5040	
2025	Team Penske	22	Ford	DAY; 35	ATL; 12*	COA; 24	PHO; 13	LVS; 15	HOM; 14	MAR; 8	DAR; 13	BRI; 24	TAL; 39	TEX; 1	KAN; 9	CLT; 17	NSH; 4	MCH; 22	MXC; 21	POC; 16	**ATL**; 36*	CSC; 11	SON; 9	DOV; 14	IND; 32	IOW; 9	GLN; 14	RCH; 4	DAY; 27*	DAR; 20	GTW; 5	BRI; 5	**NHA**; 4*	KAN; 21	ROV; 20	LVS; 6	TAL; 16*	MAR; 8	PHO; 4	7th	2330	
2026	Team Penske	22	Ford	DAY; 3	ATL; 18	COA; 15	**PHO**; 31	LVS; 15	DAR; 33	MAR; 3	BRI; 7	KAN; 30	TAL; 39	TEX; 37	GLN; 38	CLT; 8	NSH; 14	MCH; 7	POC; 34	COR; 18	SON; 24	CHI; 12	ATL; 9	NWS; 1*	IND; 3	IOW; 14	RCH; 1	NHA; 14	DAY; 18	DAR; 9	**GTW**; 3*	BRI; 1	KAN; 20	LVS; 10	CLT; 9	PHO; 6	TAL; 34	MAR; 18	HOM; 17	7th	2386	

===== Daytona 500 =====
Year	Team	Manufacturer	Start	Finish
2009	Joe Gibbs Racing	Toyota	9	43
2010	Joe Gibbs Racing	Toyota	16	20
2011	Joe Gibbs Racing	Toyota	38	23
2012	Joe Gibbs Racing	Toyota	12	9
2013	Penske Racing	Ford	21	19
2014	Team Penske	Ford	35	11
2015	Team Penske	Ford	5	**1**
2016	Team Penske	Ford	5	6
2017	Team Penske	Ford	15	6
2018	Team Penske	Ford	5	4
2019	Team Penske	Ford	4	4
2020	Team Penske	Ford	3	26
2021	Team Penske	Ford	9	12
2022	Team Penske	Ford	20	21
2023	Team Penske	Ford	3	2
2024	Team Penske	Ford	**1**	32*
2025	Team Penske	Ford	10	35
2026	Team Penske	Ford	3	3

==== Xfinity Series ====
NASCAR Xfinity Series results
Year	Team	No.	Make	1	2	3	4	5	6	7	8	9	10	11	12	13	14	15	16	17	18	19	20	21	22	23	24	25	26	27	28	29	30	31	32	33	34	35	NXSC	Pts	Ref
2008	Joe Gibbs Racing	20	Toyota	DAY	CAL	LVS	ATL	BRI	NSH	TEX	PHO	MXC	TAL	RCH	DAR	CLT	DOV; 6	**NSH**; 31	**KEN**; 1*	MLW; 2	NHA	DAY	CHI	GTY; 2	IRP; 8	CGV; 17	GLN; 7		BRI; 16	CAL; 6	**RCH**; 7	DOV; 14	KAN; 9	CLT; 14	MEM; 5	TEX; 4	PHO; 10	**HOM**; 10	20th	2555	
2008	Joe Gibbs Racing	18	Toyota																									MCH; 7											20th	2555	
2009	Joe Gibbs Racing	20	Toyota	DAY; 20	CAL; 3	LVS	BRI; 9	TEX; 12	NSH; 1*	PHO; 4	TAL; 3	RCH; 6	DAR; 12	CLT; 5	DOV; 2	NSH	**KEN**; 1	MLW	**NHA**; 2*	DAY; 4	CHI; 1*	GTY	IRP	IOW	GLN; 33	MCH	BRI	CGV	ATL; 6	RCH	DOV	KAN; 1	**CAL**; 1	CLT; 14	MEM	TEX; 24	PHO	HOM; 4	14th	3371	
2010	Joe Gibbs Racing	20	Toyota	DAY; 7	**CAL**; 5*	LVS	BRI; 14	**NSH**; 8*	PHO; 10	**TEX**; 2	TAL; 2	RCH; 6	DAR	DOV	CLT; 3	NSH	KEN; 1*	ROA	NHA; 4	DAY; 2	CHI; 2	GTY	IRP	IOW	GLN; 2	MCH; 6	BRI; 10	CGV; 6	ATL; 6	RCH	**DOV**; 2	**KAN**; 1	CAL; 5	CLT; 4	GTY	TEX; 4	**PHO**; 3	**HOM**; 7	8th	4038	
2011	Joe Gibbs Racing	20	Toyota	DAY; 12	PHO; 6	LVS	BRI; 5	CAL; 7	TEX; 4	TAL; 2	**NSH**; 4	RCH	DAR	DOV; 13	IOW	CLT; 11	CHI	MCH; 6	ROA	DAY; 1	KEN; 10	NHA; 29	NSH	IRP	IOW	GLN; 3	CGV	BRI; 2	ATL	RCH				CLT; 19	TEX; 8		HOM; 10		92nd	0^{1}	
2011	Joe Gibbs Racing	18	Toyota																												CHI; 19	DOV; 13	KAN; 7			PHO; 4			92nd	0^{1}	
2012	Joe Gibbs Racing	20	Toyota	DAY; 16	PHO; 8	LVS			TEX; 15	RCH; 18		DAR; 1	IOW	**CLT**; 6								IND; 7	IOW									CLT; 1*		TEX; 10					99th	0^{1}	
2012	Joe Gibbs Racing	18	Toyota				**BRI**; 4*	**CAL**; 1*			TAL; 1				DOV; 1*	MCH; 1	ROA	KEN	DAY; 5	NHA	CHI			GLN; 22	CGV	BRI; 1	ATL	RCH	**CHI**; 9*	KEN	DOV; 1*		**KAN**; 3		**PHO**; 1*	HOM; 16			99th	0^{1}	
2013	Penske Racing	22	Ford	DAY	PHO	LVS	BRI	CAL	TEX	RCH	TAL; 2*	DAR; 4	CLT; 3	DOV; 1	IOW	MCH; 11	ROA	KEN	DAY; 9	NHA; 11	CHI; 1	IND; 3	IOW				ATL; 6	RCH	CHI; 2	KEN	DOV; 1*	KAN	CLT; 7	TEX	PHO	HOM; 6			91st	0^{1}	
2013	Penske Racing	48	Ford																					GLN; 21	MOH	BRI													91st	0^{1}	
2014	Team Penske	22	Ford	DAY	PHO	LVS	BRI	CAL; 4*	TEX	DAR; 5	RCH	TAL	IOW	CLT	**DOV**; 3	MCH; 16	ROA	KEN	DAY; 6	NHA	CHI	IND; 5	IOW				ATL; 2	RCH	CHI	KEN	**DOV**; 2	KAN	CLT	**TEX**; 2	PHO	HOM			86th	0^{1}	
2014	Team Penske	12	Ford																					GLN; 3	MOH	BRI													86th	0^{1}	
2015	Team Penske	22	Ford	DAY	ATL; 2	LVS	**PHO**; 1*	CAL	TEX	BRI; 1**	RCH; 2	TAL; 1*	IOW	CLT	DOV	**MCH**; 7*	CHI	DAY; 14	KEN	NHA	IND	IOW					DAR; 6	RCH; 4	CHI	KEN	DOV	CLT	KAN; 3	TEX	PHO	HOM			82nd	0^{1}	
2015	Team Penske	12	Ford																				**GLN**; 1	MOH	BRI	ROA													82nd	0^{1}	
2016	Team Penske	22	Ford	DAY; 2*	ATL	LVS	PHO	CAL	TEX	BRI; 9	RCH	TAL; 27	DOV; 7	CLT; 3	POC; 5	MCH; 6	IOW	DAY; 4*	KEN	NHA	IND; 8	IOW							CHI; 7	KEN	DOV; QL^{†}		KAN; 4	TEX	PHO	HOM			88th	0^{1}	
2016	Team Penske	12	Ford																				**GLN**; 1*	MOH	BRI	ROA	DAR	RCH				CLT; 1							88th	0^{1}	
2017	Team Penske	12	Ford	DAY	ATL	LVS; 1*	PHO		**TEX**; 34	BRI	RCH												**GLN**; 2	MOH															90th	0^{1}	
2017	Team Penske	22	Ford					**CAL**; 2*				TAL; 3	CLT	DOV	POC	MCH	IOW	DAY; 8	KEN; 6	NHA	IND; 3	IOW			BRI; 9	ROA	DAR; 2	RCH	CHI	KEN	DOV	CLT	KAN	TEX	PHO	HOM			90th	0^{1}	
2018	Team Penske	22	Ford	DAY; 34	ATL; 2	LVS	PHO	CAL; 1*	TEX	BRI	RCH	TAL	DOV	CLT	POC	MCH	IOW	CHI	DAY	KEN	NHA	IOW	**GLN**; 1*	MOH	BRI; 5	ROA	DAR	IND	LVS	RCH	ROV	DOV	KAN	TEX	PHO	HOM			85th	0^{1}	
2019	Team Penske	12	Ford	DAY	ATL	LVS	PHO	CAL	TEX	BRI	RCH	TAL	DOV	CLT	POC	MCH	IOW	**CHI**; 2	DAY	KEN	NHA	IOW	GLN	MOH	BRI; 36	ROA	DAR	IND	LVS	RCH	ROV	DOV	KAN	TEX	PHO	HOM			82nd	0^{1}	
2024	AM Racing	15	Ford	DAY	ATL	LVS	PHO	COA	RCH	MAR	TEX	TAL	DOV	DAR	CLT	PIR	SON	IOW	NHA	NSH	CSC; 8	POC	IND	MCH	DAY	DAR; 38	ATL	GLN; 9	BRI	KAN	TAL	ROV	LVS	HOM	MAR	PHO			90th	0^{1}	
^{†} – Qualified but replaced by Ryan Blaney

==== Craftsman Truck Series ====
NASCAR Craftsman Truck Series results
Year	Team	No.	Make	1	2	3	4	5	6	7	8	9	10	11	12	13	14	15	16	17	18	19	20	21	22	23	24	25	NCTC	Pts	Ref
2008	HT Motorsports	59	Toyota	DAY	CAL	ATL	MAR	KAN	CLT	MFD	DOV	TEX	MCH	MLW	MEM	KEN	IRP	NSH	BRI	GTY	NHA	LVS	TAL; 26	MAR	ATL	TEX	PHO	HOM	91st	85	
2013	Brad Keselowski Racing	19	Ford	DAY	MAR	CAR; 2	KAN; 24	CLT	DOV	TEX	KEN	IOW	ELD	POC	MCH; 4	BRI	MSP	IOW	CHI	LVS	TAL	MAR	TEX	PHO	HOM				88th	0^{1}	
2014	Brad Keselowski Racing	19	Ford	DAY	MAR	KAN; 3	CLT	DOV	TEX	GTY	KEN	IOW	ELD	POC	MCH; 18	BRI	MSP	CHI	NHA	LVS	TAL	MAR	TEX	PHO	HOM				92nd	0^{1}	
2015	Brad Keselowski Racing	29	Ford	DAY	ATL	**MAR**; 1*	KAN	CLT	DOV	TEX	GTW	IOW	KEN	ELD	POC	MCH	BRI	MSP	CHI	NHA	LVS	TAL	MAR	TEX	PHO	HOM			83rd	0^{1}	
2022	David Gilliland Racing	54	Ford	DAY	LVS	ATL	COA	MAR	**BRD**; 6	DAR	KAN	TEX	CLT	GTW	SON	KNX	NSH	MOH	POC	IRP	RCH	KAN	BRI	TAL	HOM	PHO			91st	0^{1}	
2023	ThorSport Racing	66	Ford	DAY	LVS	ATL	COA	TEX	BRD; 1*	MAR	KAN	DAR	NWS	CLT	GTW	NSH	MOH	POC	RCH	IRP	MLW	KAN	BRI	TAL	HOM	PHO			85th	0^{1}	

^{*} Season still in progress
^{1} Ineligible for series points

=== ARCA Re/Max Series ===
(key) (Bold – Pole position awarded by qualifying time. Italics – Pole position earned by points standings or practice time. * – Most laps led.)

ARCA Re/Max Series results
Year	Team	No.	Make	1	2	3	4	5	6	7	8	9	10	11	12	13	14	15	16	17	18	19	20	21	ARSC	Pts	Ref
2008	Venturini Motorsports	25	Chevy	DAY	SLM	IOW	KEN	**CAR**; 1*	KEN	TOL	POC	MCH	CAY	KEN	BLN	POC	NSH	ISF	DSF	CHI	SLM	NJE			56th	475	
2008	Venturini Motorsports	15	Chevy																				TAL; 2	TOL	56th	475	
2009	Venturini Motorsports	25	Toyota	DAY; 2	SLM	CAR	TAL	KEN	TOL	POC; 1*	MCH	MFD	IOW	KEN	BLN	POC	ISF	CHI	TOL	DSF	NJE	SLM	KAN	CAR	64th	460	

==== Busch East Series ====
NASCAR Busch East Series results
Year	Team	No.	Make	1	2	3	4	5	6	7	8	9	10	11	12	13	NBEC	Pts	Ref
2007	Joe Gibbs Racing	20	Chevy	**GRE**; 1*			SBO; 3	STA; 11	**NHA**; 1*	TMP; 5	NSH; 2	**ADI**; 1	LRP; 23	MFD; 3	NHA; 1*	DOV; 2*	1st	2123	
2007	Joe Gibbs Racing	10	Chevy		ELK; 13	**IOW**; 1											1st	2123	

==== K&N Pro Series West ====
NASCAR K&N Pro Series West results
Year	Team	No.	Make	1	2	3	4	5	6	7	8	9	10	11	12	13	14	NKNPSWC	Pts	Ref
2007	Joe Gibbs Racing	10	Chevy	CTS	PHO; 1*	AMP	ELK	IOW	CNS	SON; 32	DCS	IRW	MMP	EVG	CSR	AMP		38th	262	
2009	Joe Gibbs Racing	11	Toyota	CTS	AAS	PHO	MAD	IOW	DCS	SON; 17	IRW	PIR	MMP	CNS	IOW	AAS		57th	122	
2011	Joe Gibbs Racing	18	Toyota	PHO	AAS	MMP	IOW	LVS	SON; 1*	IRW	EVG	PIR	CNS	MRP	SPO	AAS	PHO	60th	190	

== See also ==
- Even Year Logano
- List of all-time NASCAR Cup Series winners
- List of NASCAR Cup Series champions
- List of NASCAR race wins by Joey Logano

Sporting positions
Preceded by Mike Olsen	NASCAR Busch East Series champion 2007	Succeeded by Matt Kobyluck
Preceded by Martin Truex Jr. Kyle Larson; Ryan Blaney	NASCAR Cup Series Champion; 2018; 2022; 2024	Succeeded by Kyle Busch; Ryan Blaney; Kyle Larson
Achievements
Preceded by Dale Earnhardt Jr.	Daytona 500 Winner; 2015	Succeeded by Denny Hamlin
Preceded by Denny Hamlin; Kyle Larson	NASCAR All-Star Race winner 2016; 2024	Succeeded by Kyle Busch; Christopher Bell
Awards
Preceded by Regan Smith	NASCAR Sprint Cup Series Rookie of the Year; 2009	Succeeded by Kevin Conway
