= 2023 SRX Series =

Third season of the Superstar Racing Experience

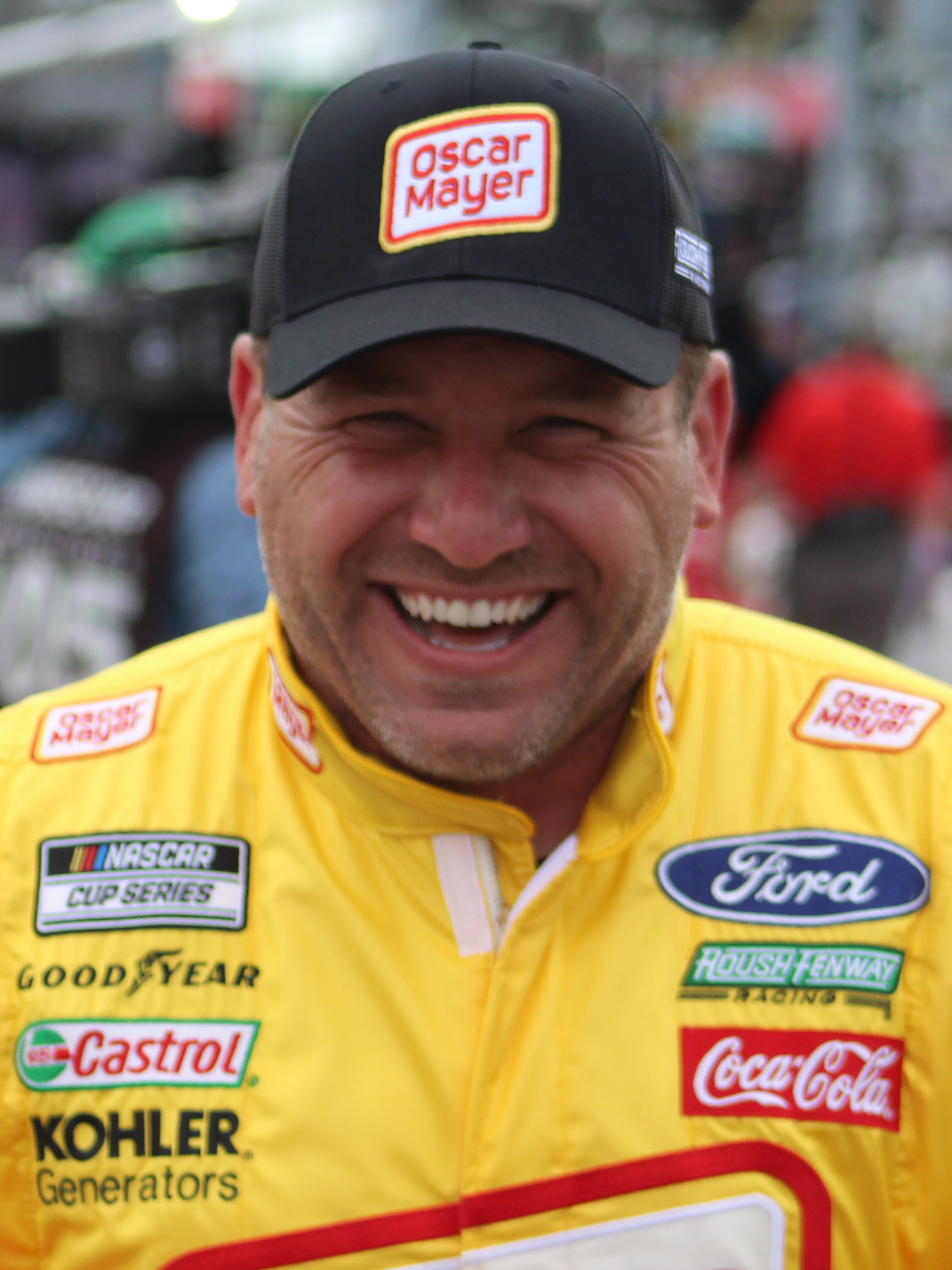
Ryan Newman, the 2023 series champion.

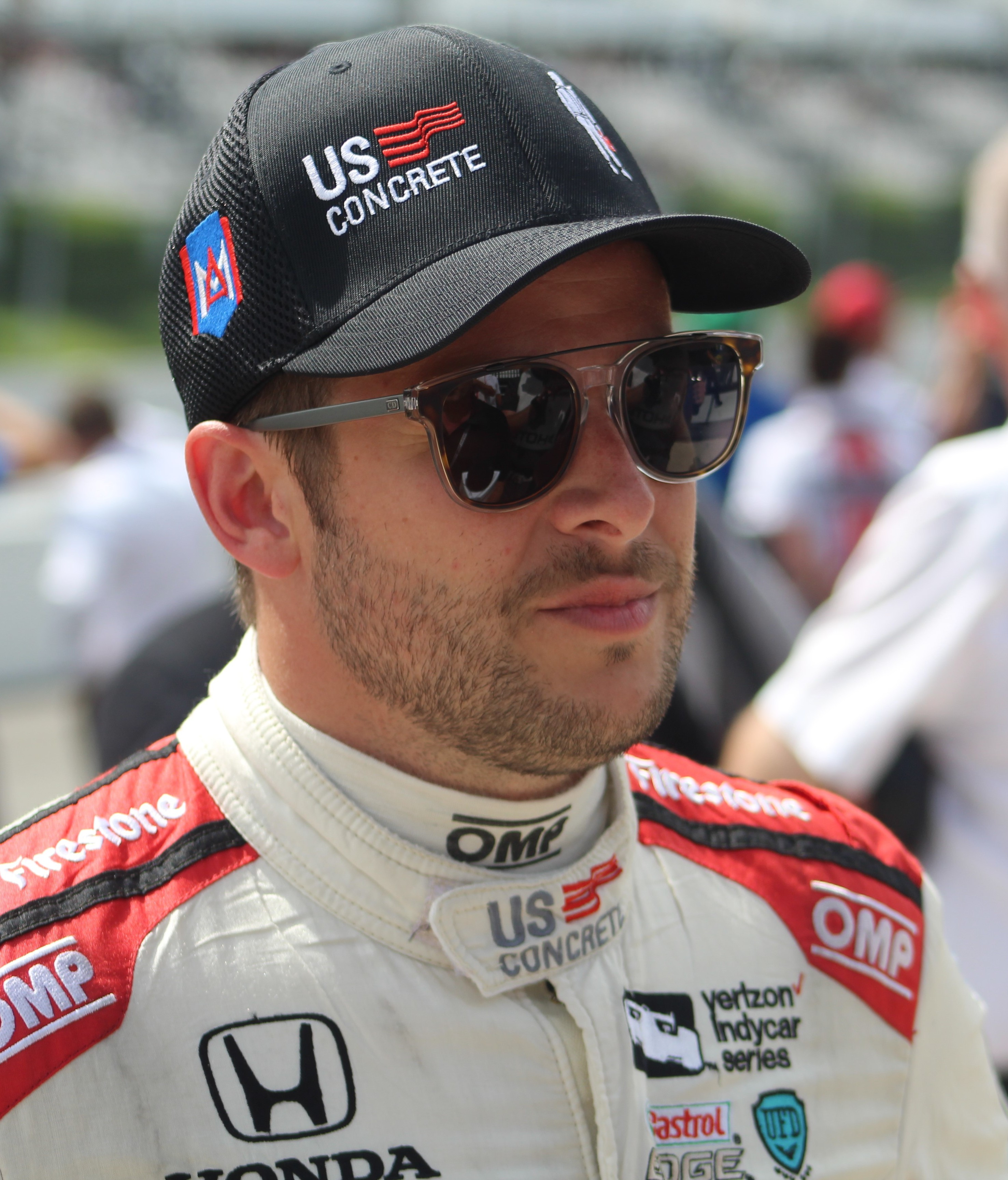
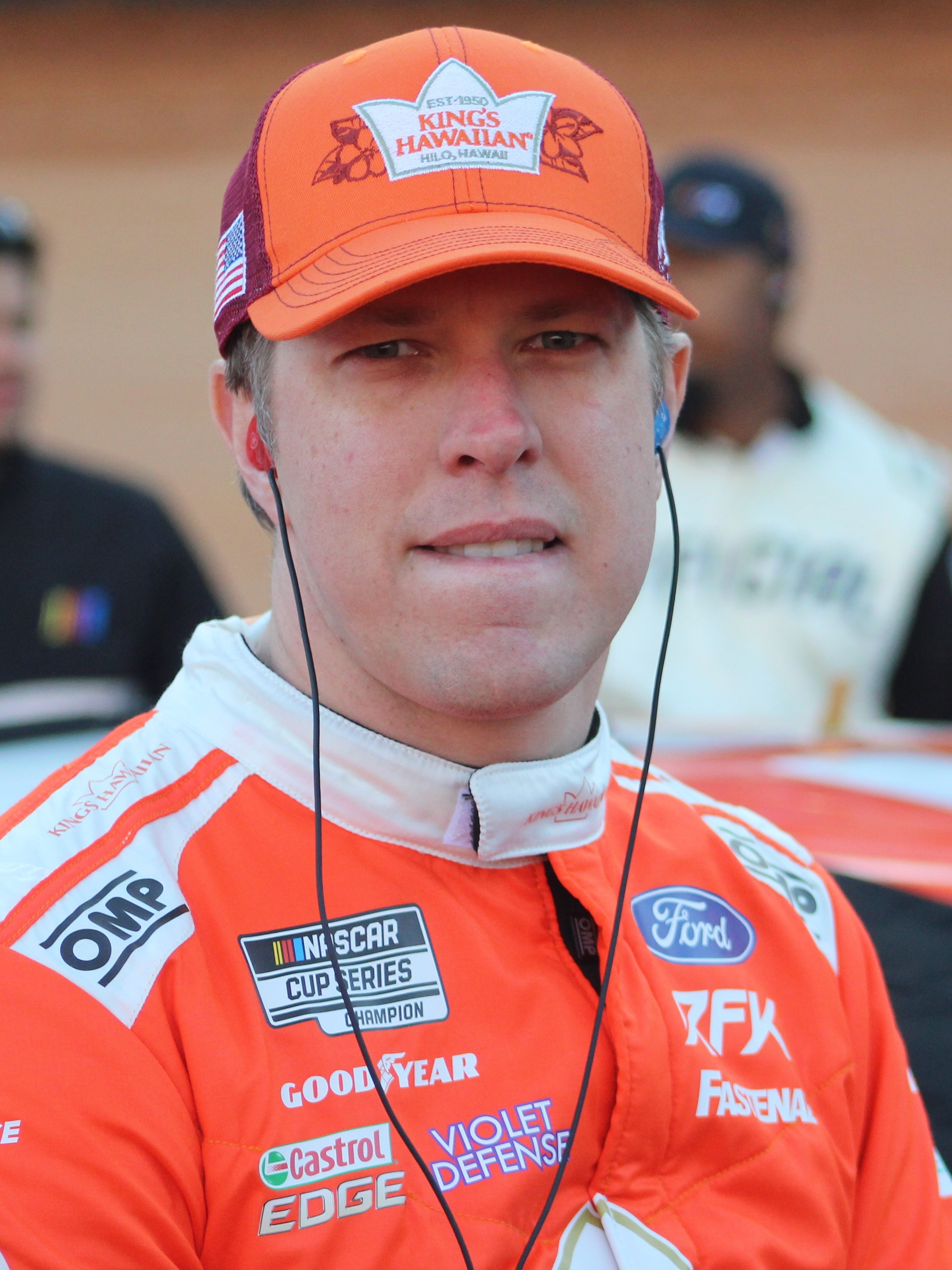
Marco Andretti (left), the 2022 SRX champion, and Brad Keselowski (right) tied for second in the championship, each finishing 45 points behind Newman.

The 2023 Camping World SRX Series was the third and final season of the Superstar Racing Experience, a stock car racing series in the United States. The six-race season began at Stafford Motor Speedway on July 13 and ended at Lucas Oil Speedway on August 17.

Marco Andretti entered the season as the defending series champion and returned to run full-time in the SRX Series in 2023. Ryan Newman won the series championship by 45 points over Andretti and Brad Keselowski after winning one race during the season at Stafford II.

== Drivers ==
=== Full-time drivers ===
No.	Driver	Primary series	Background/accomplishments	Ref
1	(United States) Marco Andretti	IndyCar Series	2003 Barber Formula Dodge Eastern class champion 2004 Barber Formula Dodge National class and Southern class champion 2 IndyCar Series wins 2022 SRX Champion	
5	(United States) Hailie Deegan	NASCAR Craftsman Truck Series	2020 ARCA Menards Series Rookie of the Year; First female winner in the ARCA Menards Series West; 2-time consecutive Truck Series Most Popular Driver (2021 and 2022)	
6	(United States) Brad Keselowski	NASCAR Cup Series	2012 NASCAR Cup Series champion 2010 NASCAR Nationwide Series champion 75 NASCAR national series wins (35 in Cup, 39 in Xfinity, & 1 in Truck); NASCAR Cup Series team owner	
14	(United States) Tony Stewart	NASCAR Cup Series	3-time NASCAR Cup Series champion (2002, 2005, and 2011); 1996–97 IndyCar Series champion 62 NASCAR national series wins (49 in Cup, 11 in Xfinity, & 2 in Truck); NASCAR Cup Series and Xfinity Series team co-owner 2021 SRX Champion	
18	(United States) Bobby Labonte	NASCAR Cup Series	2000 NASCAR Cup Series champion 1991 NASCAR Busch Series champion 32 NASCAR national series wins (21 in Cup, 10 in Xfinity, & 1 in Truck)	
39	(United States) Ryan Newman	NASCAR Cup Series	2008 Daytona 500 winner 26 NASCAR national series wins (18 in Cup, 7 in Xfinity, & 1 in Truck)	
52	(United States) Ken Schrader	NASCAR Cup Series	1985 NASCAR Cup Series Rookie of the Year; 1983 USAC Sprint Car Series Champion; 1982 USAC Silver Car Series Champion; 4 NASCAR Cup Series wins	

=== Part-time drivers ===
No.	Driver	Primary series	Track(s)	Background/accomplishments	Ref
06	(Brazil) Hélio Castroneves	IndyCar Series	Pulaski County, Berlin, Lucas Oil Speedway	4-time Indianapolis 500 winner (2001, 2002, 2009, and 2021) (tied for most all-time); 2020 WeatherTech SportsCar Championship champion 3-time consecutive 24 Hours of Daytona winner (2021, 2022, and 2023)	
07	(United States) Clint Bowyer	NASCAR Cup Series	Stafford I, Pulaski County, Lucas Oil Speedway	2008 NASCAR Nationwide Series champion 21 NASCAR national series wins (10 in Cup, 8 in Xfinity, & 3 in Truck); NASCAR on Fox Cup Series color commentator	
2	(United States) Josef Newgarden	IndyCar Series	Pulaski County	2-time IndyCar Series champion (2017 and 2019); 2023 Indianapolis 500 winner 27 IndyCar Series wins	
3	(Canada) Paul Tracy	IndyCar Series	Stafford I and II, Pulaski County (Note: Paul Tracy was originally designated as a full-time driver, but was suspended with immediate effect on July 28, 2023 after intentionally wrecking Josef Newgarden at Pulaski County Motorsports Park and collecting several other drivers. It was announced on August 2, 2023 that Paul Tracy will not return for the rest of the 2023 SRX Season.)	1990 American Racing Series champion 2003 Champ Car World Series champion 31 CART/Champ Car wins 10 Indy Lights wins	
4	(United States) Kevin Harvick	NASCAR Cup Series	Stafford I, Berlin	2014 NASCAR Cup Series champion 2-time NASCAR Busch Series champion (2001 and 2006); 2007 Daytona 500 winner 121 NASCAR national series wins (60 in Cup, 47 in Xfinity, & 14 in Truck)	
8	(United States) Matt Kenseth	NASCAR Cup Series	Eldora	2003 NASCAR Cup Series champion 2-time Daytona 500 winner (2009 and 2012); 68 NASCAR national series wins (39 in Cup & 29 in Xfinity)	
9	(United States) Kasey Kahne	NASCAR Cup Series; World of Outlaws	Berlin	31 NASCAR national series wins (18 in Cup, 8 in Xfinity, & 5 in Truck)	
10	(United States) Johnny Benson Jr.	NASCAR Cup Series	Berlin	1995 NASCAR Busch Series champion 1996 NASCAR Winston Cup Series Rookie of the year 2008 NASCAR Craftsman Truck Series champion	
11	(United States) Denny Hamlin	NASCAR Cup Series	Stafford I	3-time Daytona 500 winner (2016, 2019, and 2020); 71 NASCAR national series wins (51 in Cup, 18 in Xfinity, & 2 in Truck); NASCAR Cup Series team owner	
28	(United States) Ron Capps	NHRA	Eldora	3-time NHRA Funny Car champion 73 NHRA wins	
33	(United States) Austin Dillon	NASCAR Cup Series	Eldora	2011 NASCAR Camping World Truck Series Champion; 2013 NASCAR Nationwide Series Champion; 2018 Daytona 500 Winner; 20 NASCAR national series wins (4 in Cup, 9 in Xfinity, & 7 in Truck)	
36	(United States) Kenny Wallace	NASCAR Cup Series	Stafford II, Lucas Oil Speedway	9 NASCAR Xfinity Series wins Former NASCAR on Fox & Speed and NASCAR RaceDay analyst	
41	(United States) Ryan Preece	NASCAR Cup Series	Stafford II	2013 NASCAR Whelen Modified Tour Champion	
49	(United States) Jonathan Davenport	Lucas Oil Late Model Dirt Series	Lucas Oil Speedway	3-time Lucas Oil Late Model Dirt Series Champion (2015, 2018, and 2019)	
51	(United States) Kyle Busch	NASCAR Cup Series	Pulaski County, Berlin	2-time NASCAR Cup Series champion (2015 and 2019); 2009 NASCAR Xfinity Series champion 229 NASCAR national series wins (most all-time) (63 in Cup, 102 in Xfinity, & 64 in Truck); NASCAR Truck Series team owner	
57	(United States) Chase Briscoe	NASCAR Cup Series	Eldora	14 NASCAR national series wins (1 in Cup, 11 in Xfinity & 2 in Truck)	
66	(Brazil) Tony Kanaan	Stock Car Pro Series	Stafford I and II, Eldora	2004 IndyCar Series champion 2013 Indianapolis 500 winner 16 IndyCar Series wins	
69	(United States) Greg Biffle	NASCAR Cup Series	Stafford II	2000 NASCAR Truck Series champion 2002 NASCAR Busch Series champion 56 NASCAR national series wins (19 in Cup, 20 in Xfinity, & 17 in Truck)	
99	(Mexico) Daniel Suárez	NASCAR Cup Series	Stafford II	2016 NASCAR Xfinity Series champion 5 NASCAR national series wins (1 in Cup, 3 in Xfinity, & 1 in Truck)	
99	(United States) Ernie Francis Jr.	Indy NXT	Lucas Oil Speedway	Seven-time consecutive Trans-Am Series champion (2014 through 2020)	

Notes:

- Ryan Hunter-Reay was also scheduled to be a full-time driver in the SRX in 2023, but he decided to pull out of the series after getting an IndyCar ride with Ed Carpenter Racing in June for the rest of the 2023 IndyCar Series season.
- Paul Tracy was scheduled to run full-time but was suspended after the race at Pulaski County and did not return to the SRX for the rest of the year.

== Schedule ==
The 2023 schedule was announced on December 21, 2022. All races were held on Thursday nights instead of Saturday nights. The 2023 season also started in July and ended in August for the first time. The first two seasons started in June and ended in July.

The 2023 SRX schedule featured a return to Stafford Motor Speedway for the third straight year (making it the only track on the SRX schedule in all three years of the series) and series co-founder Tony Stewart's Eldora Speedway dirt track for the first time since 2021. The other three tracks, two of which are paved and one (Lucas Oil Speedway) of which is a dirt track, were new to the SRX. The original schedule included the paved quarter-mile Thunder Road International SpeedBowl in Barre, Vermont as the second event of the season, but due to extensive flood damage in the area the event was moved to Stafford (making it the only track so far in SRX history to host back to back races), with Thunder Road being granted a guaranteed date in 2024.

The schedule was designed based on the NASCAR Cup Series schedule in order to attract drivers from that series to race in the SRX race on the Thursday before the weekend's Cup Series race. Each race except for the season finale at Lucas Oil Speedway was held at a track in the same area of the country as the track that the Cup Series raced at that weekend.

No.	Track	Location	Type	Date
1	Stafford Motor Speedway	Stafford Springs, Connecticut	0.5 mile, paved	July 13
2	Stafford Motor Speedway	Stafford Springs, Connecticut	0.5 mile, paved	July 20
3	Pulaski County Motorsports Park	Fairlawn, Virginia	0.416 mile, paved	July 27
4	Berlin Raceway	Marne, Michigan	0.4375 mile, paved	August 3
5	Eldora Speedway	Rossburg, Ohio	0.5 mile, dirt	August 10
6	Lucas Oil Speedway	Wheatland, Missouri	0.375 mile, dirt	August 17

=== Broadcasting ===
All six races were broadcast live on TV in the United States on ESPN, replacing CBS and Paramount+.

On April 25, 2023, the lineup of commentators for the SRX in 2023 was announced. Lap-by-Lap Allen Bestwick and pit reporter Matt Yocum moved over from CBS and returned in 2023. Bestwick previously worked for ESPN on their NASCAR coverage from 2007 to 2014 (first as a pit reporter, then as a studio host and then as a play-by-play) and IndyCar Coverage from 2014 to 2018. There were three rotating guest color commentators in the booth: Joey Logano at Stafford I, Berlin and Eldora, Conor Daly at Pulaski County Motorsports Park and Lucas Oil Speedway, and Darrell Waltrip at Stafford II.

Lindsay Czarniak, who was the host role for the SRX on CBS in 2021 and 2022, did not return for this season. She previously worked for ESPN in the same role on their IndyCar coverage. On July 6, ESPN revealed that Nicole Briscoe, who was the studio host for NASCAR on ESPN from 2011 to 2014, would be the host on the SRX TV broadcasts in 2023, replacing Czarniak. There was no roving reporter this season, a role previously filled by Brad Daugherty in 2021 and Willy T. Ribbs in 2022, resulting in each broadcast only having four commentators (down from five).

== Results and standings ==
=== Race results ===
No.	Track	Heat 1 winner	Heat 2 winner	Feature race winner
1	Stafford Speedway	Denny Hamlin	Ryan Newman	Denny Hamlin
2	Stafford Speedway	Tony Stewart	Brad Keselowski	Ryan Newman
3	Motor Mile Speedway	Marco Andretti	Clint Bowyer	Kyle Busch
4	Berlin Raceway	Brad Keselowski	Ryan Newman	Kyle Busch
5	Eldora Speedway	Tony Stewart	Tony Stewart	Tony Stewart
6	Lucas Oil Speedway	Jonathan Davenport	Bobby Labonte	Jonathan Davenport

=== Drivers' championship ===
Points are awarded for both heat races as well as the feature:

Points	Position												
Points	1st	2nd	3rd	4th	5th	6th	7th	8th	9th	10th	11th	12th	13th
Heat	12	11	10	9	8	7	6	5	4	3	2	1	1
Feature	25	22	20	18	16	14	12	10	8	6	4	2	1

(key) * – Most laps led (feature) ^{1} – Heat 1 winner ^{2} – Heat 2 winner

Pos.	Driver	STA	STA	MMI	BER	ELD (Note: In Heat Race #1 at Eldora Speedway, Austin Dillon was running in 7th place when a lower radiator hose burst sending him into the outside wall into turn three as well as dumping fluid onto the track which would ultimately end up collecting all of the drivers running in the 8th-12th positions. These drivers include: Hailie Deegan, Marco Andretti, Chase Briscoe, Tony Kanaan, and Matt Kenseth. Because of this, Hailie Deegan and Marco Andretti, the two series regulars who were involved ended up going to a back up car for the rest of the night, while Tony Kanaan and Austin Dillon were unable to participate in Heat Race #2 as well as the Feature because there was no backup car for them to use, and their cars had sustained too much damage for them to continue. Chase Briscoe was unable to participate in Heat Race #2, but was able to rejoin the field on Lap 47 of 75 of the Feature and eventually was able to drive to a 7th place finish after being placed on the lead lap by SRX race control. Matt Kenseth sustained minimal damage in the wreck and was able to continue in the same car for the remainder of the night.)	LOS	Pts
1	Ryan Newman	2^{2}	1	5	3^{2}	3	4	212
2	Marco Andretti	6	3	9^{1}	4	6	6	167
3	Brad Keselowski	9	10^{2}	4	2*^{1}	9	2	167
4	Tony Stewart	11	7^{1}	3	7	1*^{12}	7	164
5	Ken Schrader	7	4	12	6	8	3	150
6	Bobby Labonte	8	6	7	9	4	12^{2}	145
7	Hailie Deegan	5	8	8	5	2	10	140
Part-time drivers (ineligible for points)
	Kyle Busch			1*	1			0
	Denny Hamlin	1*^{1}						0
	Jonathan Davenport						1*^{1}	0
	Clint Bowyer	3		2^{2}			5	0
	Daniel Suárez		2					0
	Paul Tracy	4	11	10				0
	Greg Biffle		5					0
	Matt Kenseth					5		0
	Hélio Castroneves			6	8		9	0
	Chase Briscoe					7		0
	Kenny Wallace		9				8	0
	Tony Kanaan	10	12			12		0
	Kevin Harvick	12			10			0
	Ron Capps					10		0
	Josef Newgarden			11				0
	Kasey Kahne				11			0
	Austin Dillon					11		0
	Ernie Francis Jr.						11	0
	Johnny Benson Jr.				12			0
	Ryan Preece		13*					0

== See also ==
- 2023 NASCAR Cup Series
- 2023 NASCAR Xfinity Series
- 2023 NASCAR Craftsman Truck Series
- 2023 IndyCar Series
- 2023 Indy NXT
- 2023 ARCA Menards Series
- 2023 ARCA Menards Series East
- 2023 ARCA Menards Series West
- 2023 NASCAR Whelen Modified Tour
- 2023 NASCAR Pinty's Series
- 2023 NASCAR Mexico Series
- 2023 NASCAR Whelen Euro Series
- 2023 NASCAR Brasil Sprint Race
- 2023 CARS Tour
- 2023 SMART Modified Tour
