= NASCAR Xfinity Series at Mexico City =

NASCAR Xfinity Series stock car race in Mexico

The Chilango 150

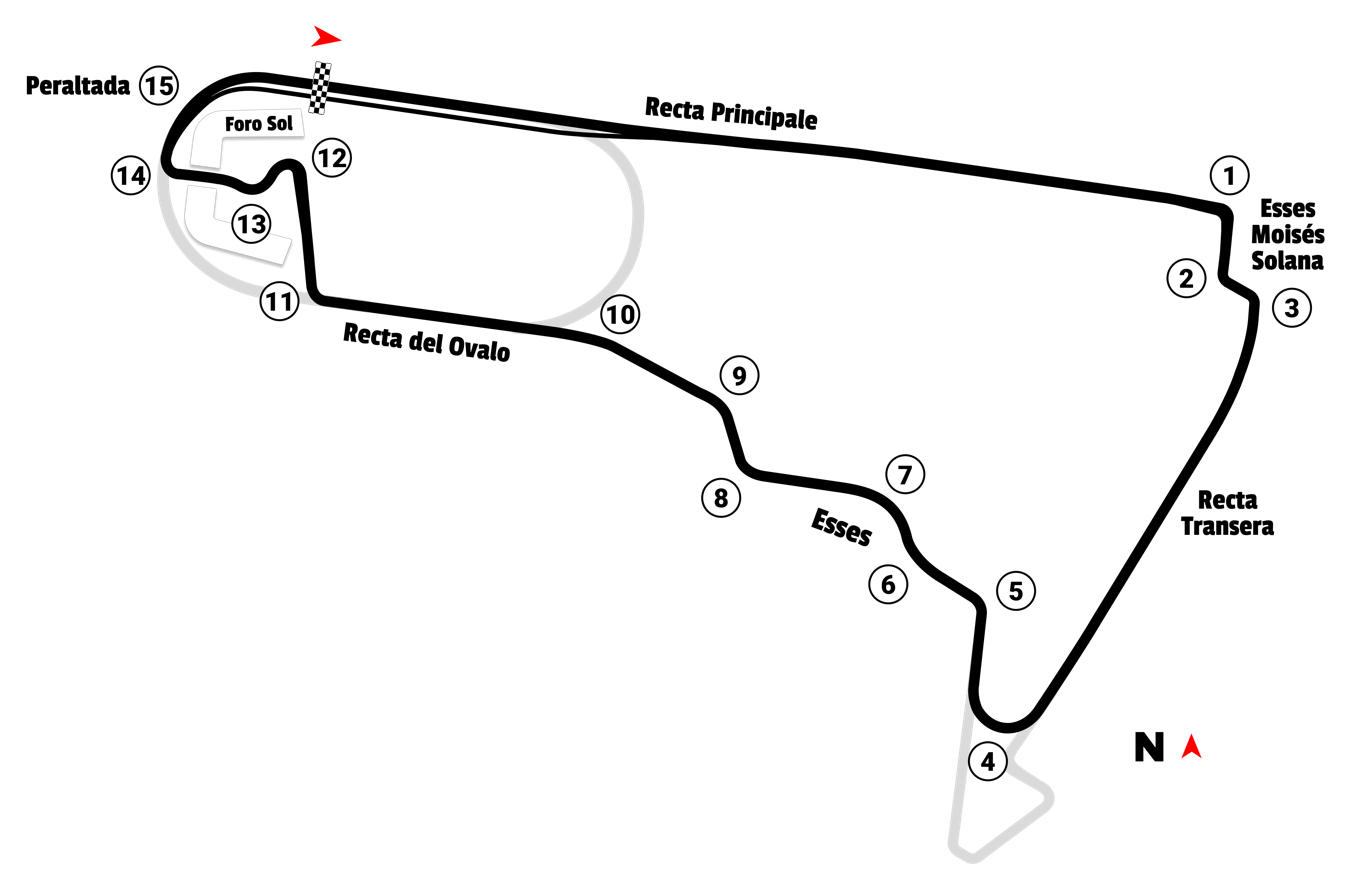

NASCAR Xfinity Series
- Venue: Autódromo Hermanos Rodríguez
- Location: Mexico City, Mexico
- First race: 2005
- Last race: 2025
- Distance: 201.44 miles (324.19 km)
- Laps: 65
- Previous names: Telcel-Motorola 200 Presented by Banamex (2005–2006); Telcel-Motorola Mexico 200 (2007); Corona México 200 presented by Banamex (2008)
- Most wins (team): Joe Gibbs Racing (2)
- Most wins (manufacturer): Chevrolet (3)

Circuit information
- Surface: Asphalt
- Length: 2.429 mi (3.909 km)
- Turns: 14

Stock car races in the Xfinity Series that was held at the Autódromo Hermanos Rodríguez road course in Mexico City, Mexico from 2005 to 2008, and in 2025.

In its original run as a standalone event, it was notable for being the first points-paying NASCAR national touring series race held outside the United States since 1958. It later became one of three road races on the second-tier circuit (joining races at Watkins Glen and Montreal).

In 2025 it became a support race for the NASCAR Cup Series race at the same track.

Mexico native Daniel Suárez is the final winner of the event.

== History ==
Much attention was directed towards this race, as it was the first NASCAR points-paying race outside the United States since 1958. The only recent international races for NASCAR had been those at the Suzuka Circuit and Twin Ring Motegi (1996–1998) in Japan, but the races were non-points-paying exhibition races. In 1952, NASCAR sanctioned points-paying races on the Canadian side of Niagara Falls.

The Autódromo Hermanos Rodríguez track is a very popular track for open-wheel racing such as Formula One and Champ Car. However, some adjustments were necessary to adapt the course for stock cars. The most significant alteration involved the introduction of a chicane on the pit straight. Additionally, a link was incorporated to bypass Curva Héctor Rebaque, instead integrating a sweeping curve between the track's short circuit curve and Ese del Lago. This modification was prompted by the intensified braking demands of the heavier stock cars.

In the inaugural event, ticket sales were good, and fans packed the track after the announcement that several local drivers would drive NASCAR entries normally driven by other drivers. Among them were open-wheel star Adrián Fernández, Jorge Goeters, Mara Reyes (a female driver), Carlos Contreras, and Michel Jourdain Jr. who had just moved to NASCAR from Champ Car. The race also marked the first time that NASCAR had run a Busch Series race on a road course since 2001. In 2006, Denny Hamlin took his first Busch Series win with an impressive performance at the track. Road-course ringer Boris Said made another fine visit to take second place after providing Hamlin with his stiffest challenge. In 2007, Juan Pablo Montoya took his first Busch Series win.

The logo for the 2008 race.

In the 2008 race, the race was renamed the Corona Mexico 200. Kyle Busch passed Scott Pruett with 7 laps to go to win the race.

In the return race in 2025, known as the Chilango 150 Mexico native Daniel Suárez would survive a huge incident and would hold off Taylor Gray to earn the win.

On July 30, 2025, The Athletic reported that NASCAR would not return to Mexico City in 2026, citing the scheduling challenge the June date presented due to Mexico City serving as a host city for the 2026 FIFA World Cup. The Athletic also reported that NASCAR attempted to find a different date in the 2026 schedule, but eventually decided to focus on finding the event a date on the 2027 schedule.

== Layouts used ==
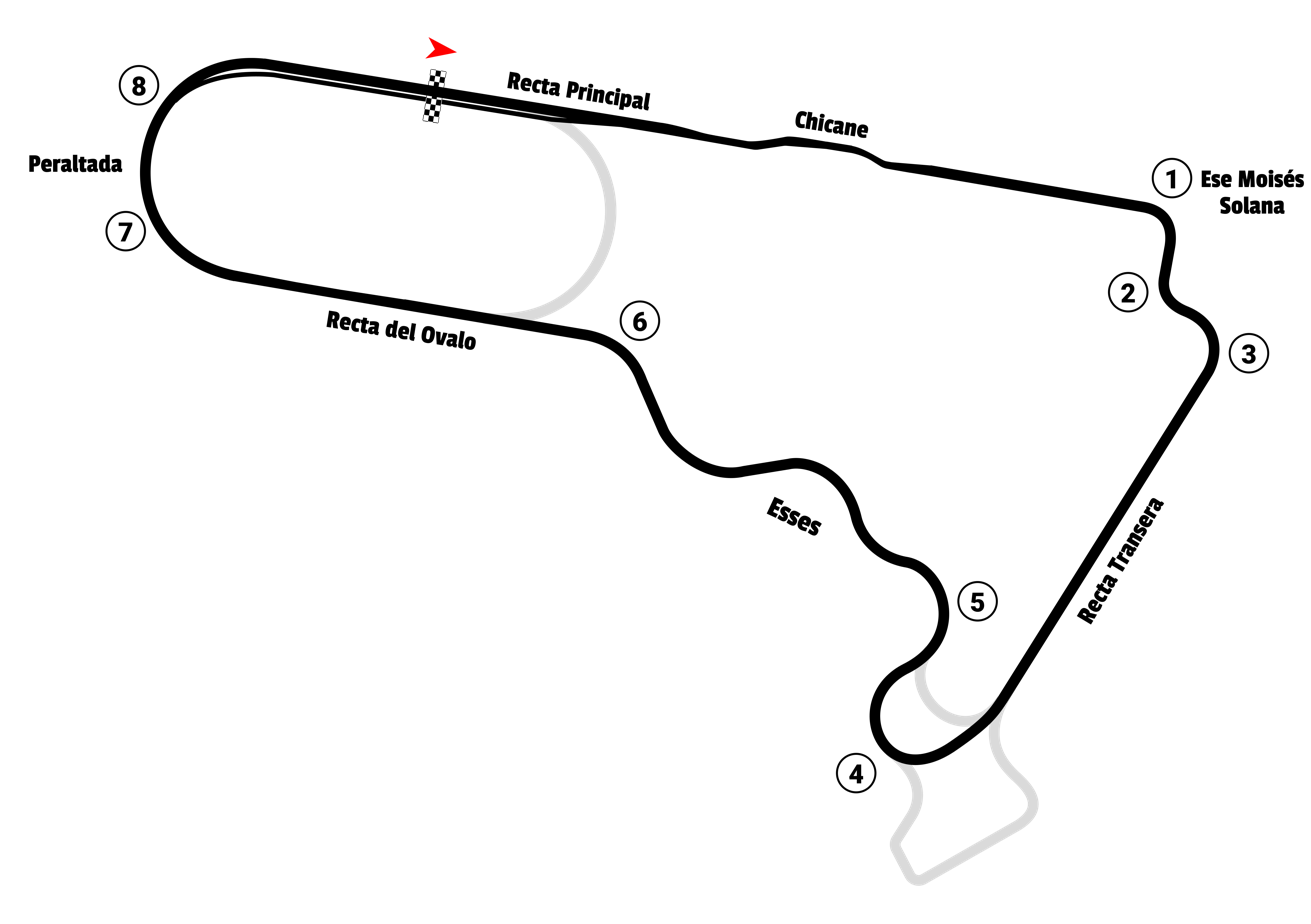
The track layout from 2005–2006.

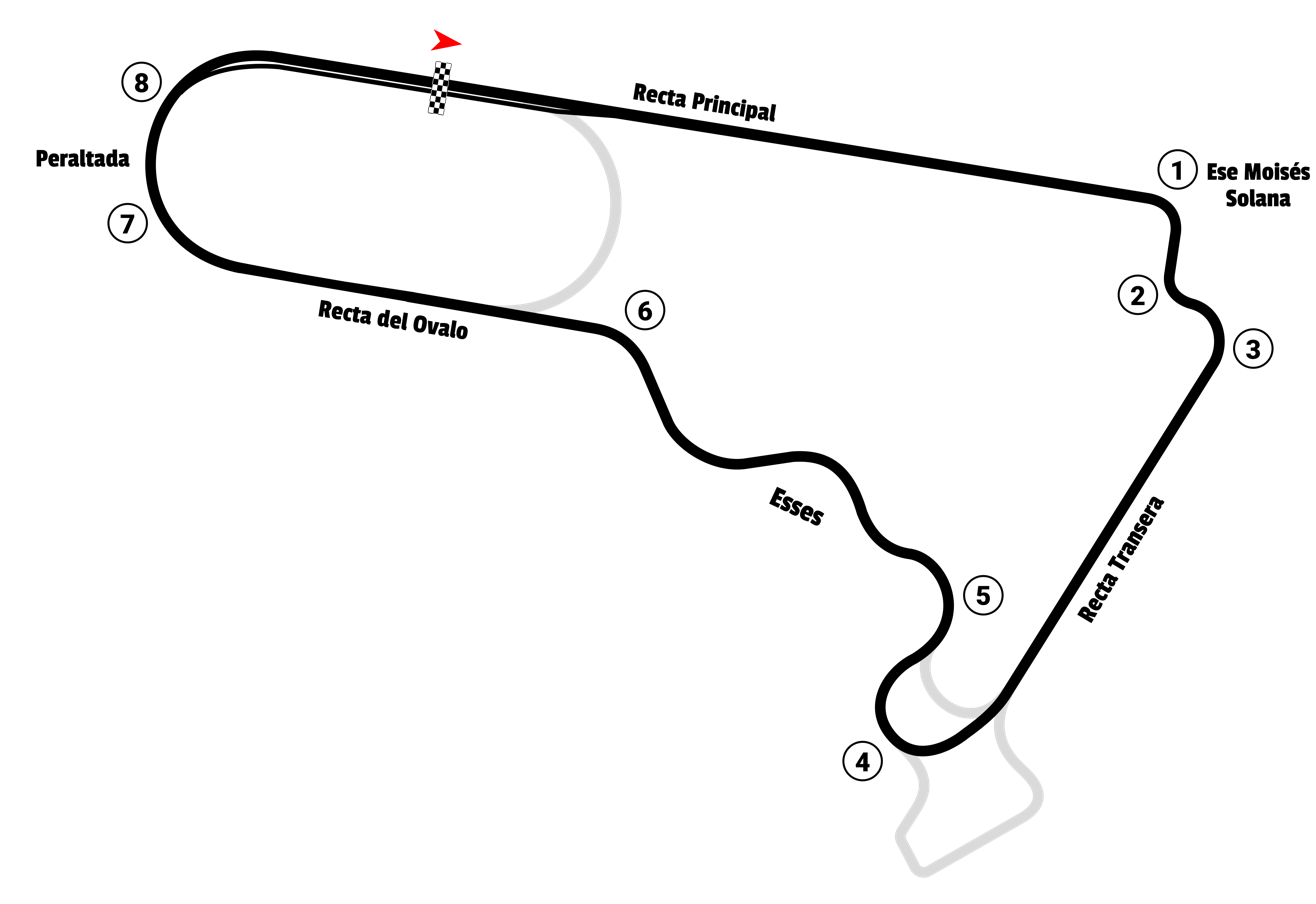
The track layout from 2007–2008.

== Past winners ==
Year	Date	No.	Driver	Team	Manufacturer	Race Distance		Race Time	Average Speed (mph)	Report	Ref
Year	Date	No.	Driver	Team	Manufacturer	Laps	Miles (km)	Race Time	Average Speed (mph)	Report	Ref
NASCAR Circuit with Chicane: 4.053 km (2005–2006)
2005	March 6	8	Martin Truex Jr.	Chance 2 Motorsports	Chevrolet	80	201.44 (324.186)	2:58:49	67.591	Report	
2006	March 5	20	Denny Hamlin	Joe Gibbs Racing	Chevrolet	80	201.44 (324.186)	2:58:59	67.528	Report	
NASCAR Circuit: 4.052 km (2007–2008)
2007	March 4	42	Juan Pablo Montoya	Chip Ganassi Racing	Dodge	82*	206.476 (332.29)	2:45:15	74.969	Report	
2008	April 20	20	Kyle Busch	Joe Gibbs Racing	Toyota	80	201.44 (324.186)	2:57:25	68.124	Report	
2009 – 2024	Not held										
National Circuit with Foro Sol: 3.909 km (2025)
2025	June 14	9	Daniel Suárez	JR Motorsports	Chevrolet	65	157.885 (254.091)	2:16:14	69.278	Report	

- 2007: Race extended due to NASCAR overtime.

== See also ==
- Viva México 250
