= List of NASCAR race wins by Kevin Harvick =

Kevin Harvick is an American racing driver who won a Monster Energy NASCAR Cup Series championship. Over the course of his racing career, Harvick has won multiple races, 60 of which have been in the NASCAR Cup Series as well as 47 wins in the Xfinity Series and 14 wins in the Camping World Truck Series for a total of 121 wins across NASCAR's three top series.

== NASCAR ==
=== NASCAR Cup Series ===
In the Cup Series, Kevin Harvick, the 2001 Rookie of the Year and the 2014 series champion, has won 60 races to date, at 21 different tracks.

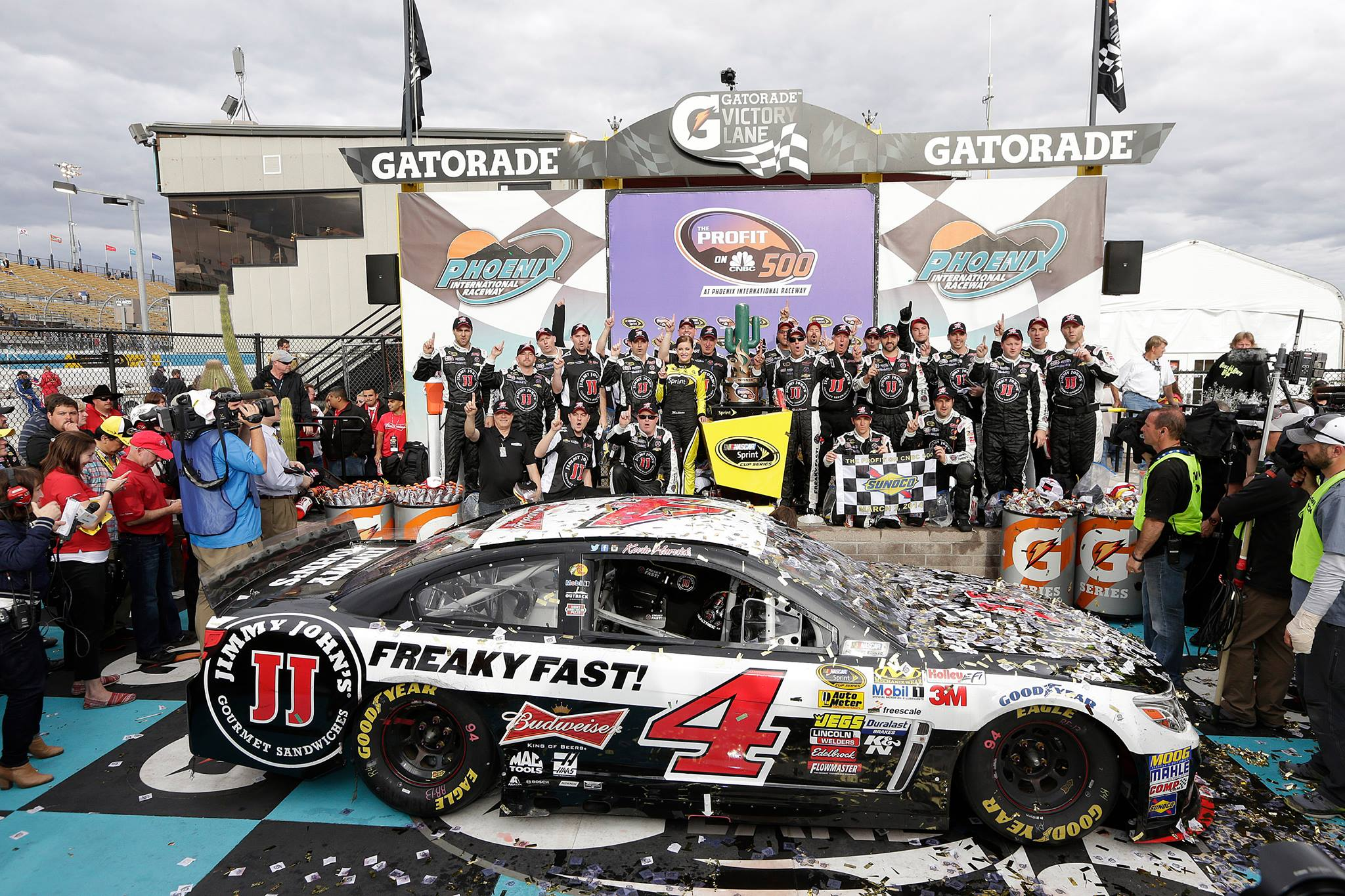
Harvick in victory lane with his team at the 2014 The Profit on CNBC 500

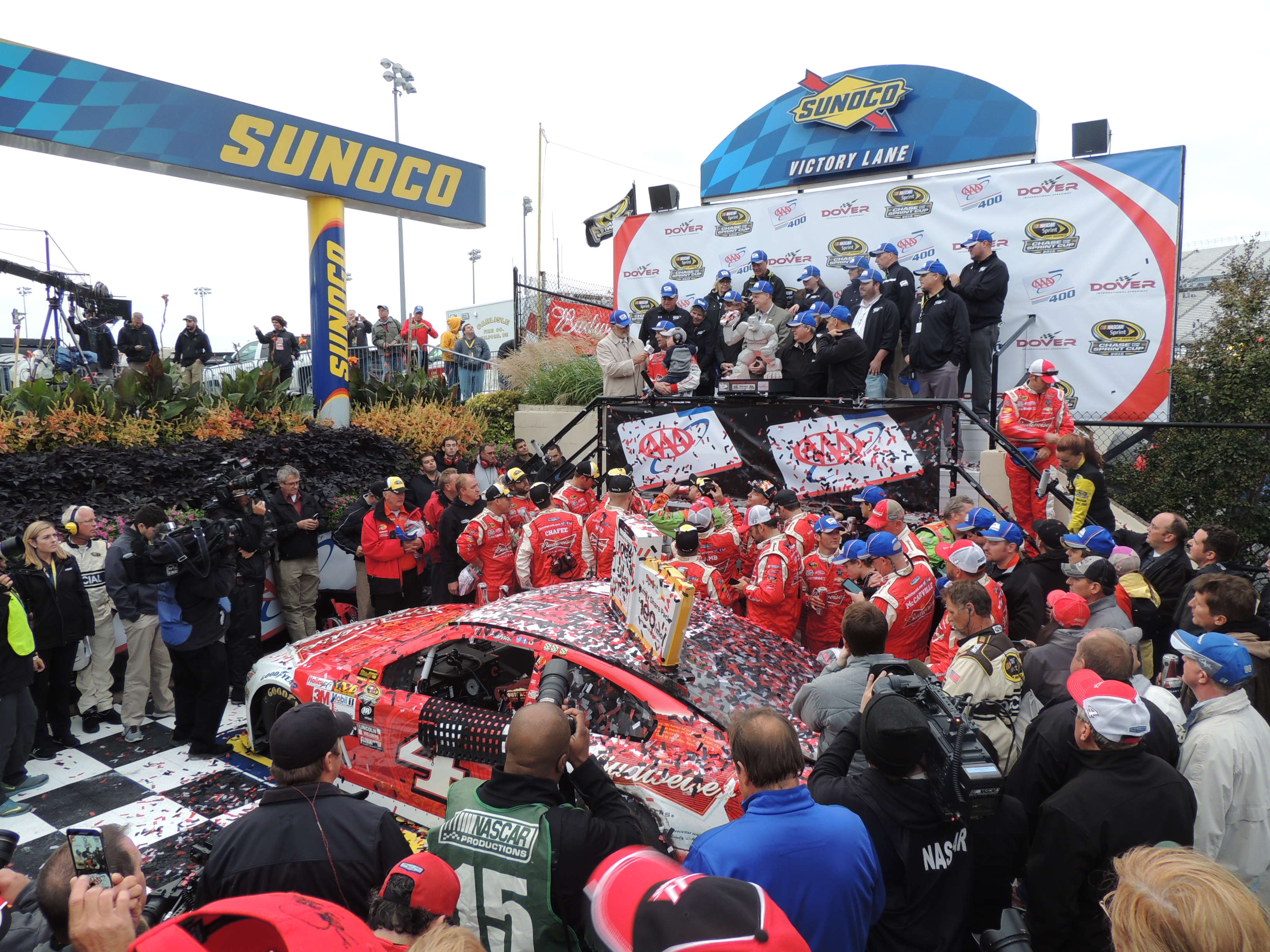
Harvick in victory lane with his team at the 2015 AAA 400

NASCAR Cup Series victories
No.	Date	Season	Race	Track	Location
1	March 11, 2001	2001	Cracker Barrel Old Country Store 500	Atlanta Motor Speedway	Hampton, Georgia
2	July 15, 2001	2001	Tropicana 400	Chicagoland Speedway	Joliet, Illinois
3	July 14, 2002	2002	Tropicana 400	Chicagoland Speedway	Joliet, Illinois
4	August 3, 2003	2003	Brickyard 400	Indianapolis Motor Speedway	Speedway, Indiana
5	April 3, 2005	2005	Food City 500	Bristol Motor Speedway	Bristol, Tennessee
6	April 22, 2006	2006	Subway Fresh 500	Phoenix International Raceway	Avondale, Arizona
7	August 13, 2006	2006	AMD at the Glen	Watkins Glen International	Watkins Glen, New York
8	September 9, 2006	2006	Chevy Rock & Roll 400	Richmond International Raceway	Richmond, Virginia
9	September 17, 2006	2006	Sylvania 300	New Hampshire International Speedway	Loudon, New Hampshire
10	November 12, 2006	2006	Checker Auto Parts 500	Phoenix International Raceway	Avondale, Arizona
11	February 18, 2007	2007	Daytona 500	Daytona International Speedway	Daytona Beach, Florida
12	April 25, 2010	2010	Aaron's 499	Talladega Superspeedway	Lincoln, Alabama
13	July 3–4, 2010	2010	Coke Zero 400	Daytona International Speedway	Daytona Beach, Florida
14	August 15, 2010	2010	Carfax 400	Michigan International Speedway	Brooklyn, Michigan
15	March 27, 2011	2011	Auto Club 400	Auto Club Speedway	Fontana, California
16	April 3, 2011	2011	Goody's Fast Relief 500	Martinsville Speedway	Ridgeway, Virginia
17	May 29, 2011	2011	Coca-Cola 600	Charlotte Motor Speedway	Concord, North Carolina
18	September 10, 2011	2011	Wonderful Pistachios 400	Richmond International Raceway	Richmond, Virginia
19	November 11, 2012	2012	AdvoCare 500	Phoenix International Raceway	Avondale, Arizona
20	April 27, 2013	2013	Toyota Owners 400	Richmond International Raceway	Richmond, Virginia
21	May 26, 2013	2013	Coca-Cola 600	Charlotte Motor Speedway	Concord, North Carolina
22	October 6, 2013	2013	Hollywood Casino 400	Kansas Speedway	Kansas City, Kansas
23	November 10, 2013	2013	AdvoCare 500	Phoenix International Raceway	Avondale, Arizona
24	March 2, 2014	2014	The Profit on CNBC 500	Phoenix International Raceway	Avondale, Arizona
25	April 12, 2014	2014	Bojangles' Southern 500	Darlington Raceway	Darlington, South Carolina
26	October 11, 2014	2014	Bank of America 500	Charlotte Motor Speedway	Concord, North Carolina
27	November 9, 2014	2014	Quicken Loans Race for Heroes 500	Phoenix International Raceway	Avondale, Arizona
28	November 16, 2014	2014	Ford EcoBoost 400	Homestead-Miami Speedway	Homestead, Florida
29	March 8, 2015	2015	Kobalt 400	Las Vegas Motor Speedway	Las Vegas, Nevada
30	March 15, 2015	2015	CampingWorld.com 500	Phoenix International Raceway	Avondale, Arizona
31	October 4, 2015	2015	AAA 400	Dover International Speedway	Dover, Delaware
32	March 13, 2016	2016	Good Sam 500	Phoenix International Raceway	Avondale, Arizona
33	August 20/21, 2016	2016	Bass Pro Shops NRA Night Race	Bristol Motor Speedway	Bristol, Tennessee
34	September 25, 2016	2016	Bad Boy Off Road 300	New Hampshire Motor Speedway	Loudon, New Hampshire
35	October 16, 2016	2016	Hollywood Casino 400	Kansas Speedway	Kansas City, Kansas
36	June 25, 2017	2017	Toyota/Save Mart 350	Sonoma Raceway	Sonoma, California
37	November 5, 2017	2017	AAA Texas 500	Texas Motor Speedway	Fort Worth, Texas
38	February 25, 2018	2018	Folds of Honor QuikTrip 500	Atlanta Motor Speedway	Hampton, Georgia
39	March 4, 2018	2018	Pennzoil 400	Las Vegas Motor Speedway	Las Vegas, Nevada
40	March 11, 2018	2018	TicketGuardian 500	ISM Raceway	Avondale, Arizona
41	May 6, 2018	2018	AAA 400 Drive for Autism	Dover International Speedway	Dover, Delaware
42	May 12, 2018	2018	KC Masterpiece 400	Kansas Speedway	Kansas City, Kansas
43	July 22, 2018	2018	Foxwoods Resort Casino 301	New Hampshire Motor Speedway	Loudon, New Hampshire
44	August 12, 2018	2018	Consumers Energy 400	Michigan International Speedway	Brooklyn, Michigan
45	November 4, 2018	2018	AAA Texas 500	Texas Motor Speedway	Fort Worth, Texas
46	July 21, 2019	2019	Foxwoods Resort Casino 301	New Hampshire Motor Speedway	Loudon, New Hampshire
47	August 11, 2019	2019	Consumers Energy 400	Michigan International Speedway	Brooklyn, Michigan
48	September 9, 2019	2019	Brickyard 400	Indianapolis Motor Speedway	Speedway, Indiana
49	November 3, 2019	2019	AAA Texas 500	Texas Motor Speedway	Fort Worth, Texas
50	May 17, 2020	2020	The Real Heroes 400	Darlington Raceway	Darlington, South Carolina
51	June 7, 2020	2020	Folds of Honor QuikTrip 500	Atlanta Motor Speedway	Hampton, Georgia
52	June 27, 2020	2020	Pocono Organics 325	Pocono Raceway	Long Pond, Pennsylvania
53	July 5, 2020	2020	Brickyard 400	Indianapolis Motor Speedway	Speedway, Indiana
54	August 8, 2020	2020	FireKeepers Casino 400	Michigan International Speedway	Brooklyn, Michigan
55	August 9, 2020	2020	Consumers Energy 400	Michigan International Speedway	Brooklyn, Michigan
56	August 23, 2020	2020	Drydene 311 (Sunday)	Dover International Speedway	Dover, Delaware
57	September 6, 2020	2020	Cook Out Southern 500	Darlington Raceway	Darlington, South Carolina
58	September 19, 2020	2020	Bass Pro Shops NRA Night Race	Bristol Motor Speedway	Bristol, Tennessee
59	August 7, 2022	2022	FireKeepers Casino 400	Michigan International Speedway	Brooklyn, Michigan
60	August 14, 2022	2022	Federated Auto Parts 400	Richmond Raceway	Richmond, Virginia

=== Xfinity Series ===
In the Xfinity Series, Harvick, the 2000 Rookie of the Year and two time series champion has won 47 races which ranks him third on the all-time wins. He's won at 21 different tracks.

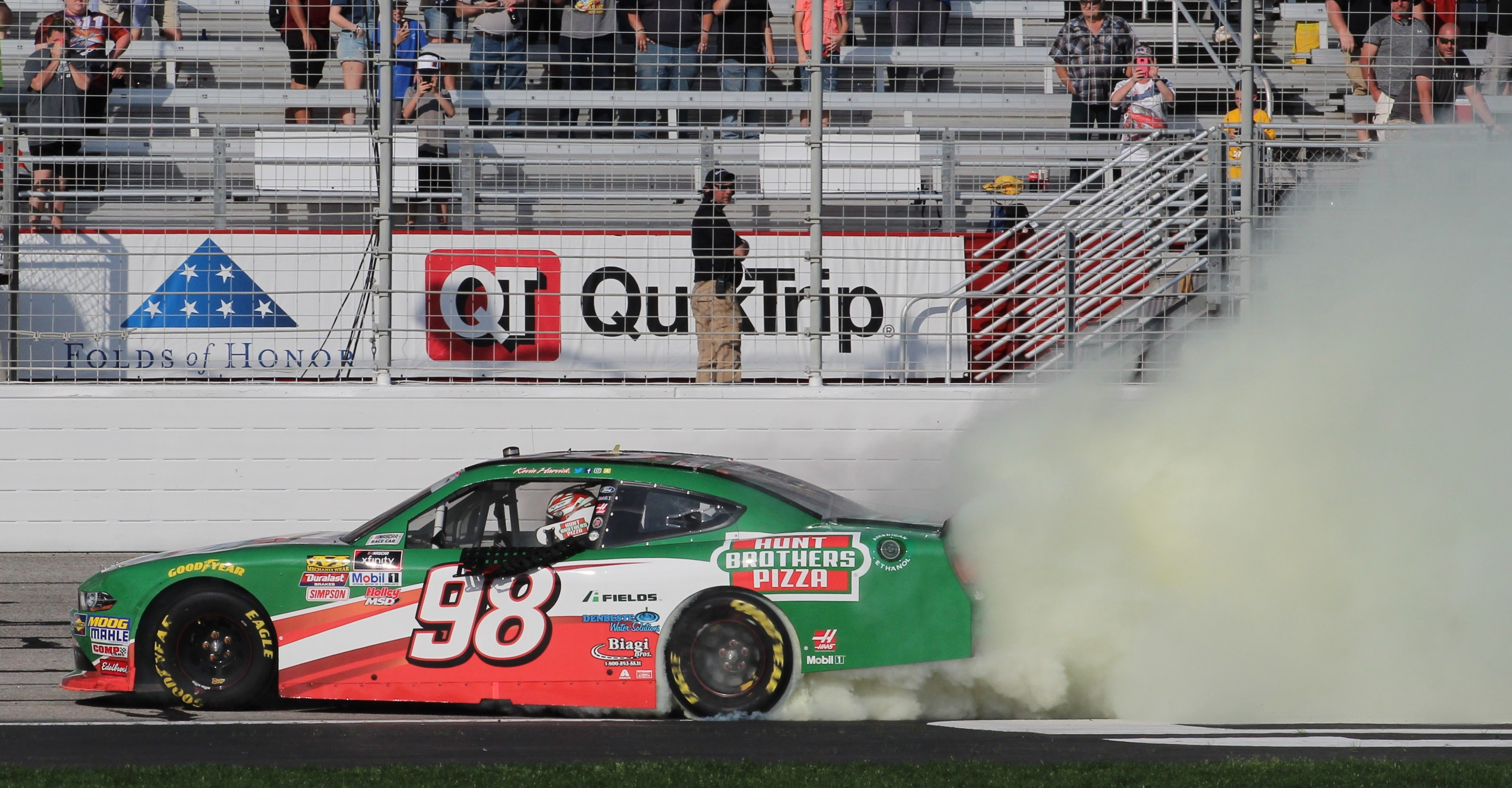
Harvick performing a burnout at the 2018 Rinnai 250

Xfinity Series victories
No.	Date	Season	Race	Track	Location
1	July 29, 2000	2000	Carquest Auto Parts 250	Gateway International Raceway	Madison, Illinois
2	August 25, 2000	2000	Food City 250	Bristol Motor Speedway	Bristol, Tennessee
3	October 29, 2000	2000	Sam's Town 250	Memphis Motorsports Park	Millington, Tennessee
4	March 31, 2001	2001	Jani-King 300	Texas Motor Speedway	Fort Worth, Texas
5	June 16, 2001	2001	Outback Steakhouse 300	Kentucky Speedway	Sparta, Kentucky
6	July 21, 2001	2001	Carquest Auto Parts 250	Gateway International Raceway	Madison, Illinois
7	August 4, 2001	2001	Kroger 200	Indianapolis Raceway Park	Brownsburg, Indiana
8	August 24, 2001	2001	Food City 250	Bristol Motor Speedway	Bristol, Tennessee
9	March 22, 2003	2003	Channellock 250	Bristol Motor Speedway	Bristol, Tennessee
10	May 2, 2003	2003	Hardee's 250	Richmond International Raceway	Richmond, Virginia
11	August 16, 2003	2003	Cabela's 250	Michigan International Speedway	Brooklyn, Michigan
12	March 6, 2004	2004	Sam's Town 300	Las Vegas Motor Speedway	Las Vegas, Nevada
13	November 20, 2004	2004	Ford 300	Homestead-Miami Speedway	Homestead, Florida
14	April 4, 2005	2005	Sharpie Professional 250	Bristol Motor Speedway	Bristol, Tennessee
15	July 9, 2005	2005	USG Durock 300	Chicagoland Speedway	Joliet, Illinois
16	September 9, 2005	2005	Emerson Radio 250	Richmond International Raceway	Richmond, Virginia
17	November 5, 2005	2005	O'Reilly Challenge	Texas Motor Speedway	Fort Worth, Texas
18	April 15, 2006	2006	Pepsi 300	Nashville Superspeedway	Lebanon, Tennessee
19	April 21, 2006	2006	Bashas' Supermarkets 200	Phoenix International Raceway	Avondale, Arizona
20	May 5, 2006	2006	Circuit City 250	Richmond International Raceway	Richmond, Virginia
21	July 22, 2006	2006	Goody's 250	Martinsville Speedway	Ridgeway, Virginia
22	August 5, 2006	2006	Kroger 200	O'Reilly Raceway Park	Brownsburg, Indiana
23	September 8, 2006	2006	Emerson Radio 250	Richmond International Raceway	Richmond, Virginia
24	September 30, 2006	2006	Yellow Transportation 300	Kansas Speedway	Kansas City, Kansas
25	October 28, 2006	2006	Sam's Town 250	Memphis Motorsports Park	Millington, Tennessee
26	November 4, 2006	2006	O'Reilly Challenge	Texas Motor Speedway	Fort Worth, Texas
27	February 17, 2007	2007	Orbitz 300	Daytona International Speedway	Daytona Beach, Florida
28	June 30, 2007	2007	Camping World 200	New Hampshire International Speedway	Loudon, New Hampshire
29	July 14, 2007	2007	USG Durock 300	Chicagoland Speedway	Joliet, Illinois
30	August 4, 2007	2007	NAPA Auto Parts 200	Circuit Gilles Villeneuve	Montreal, Quebec, Canada
31	August 11, 2007	2007	Zippo 200 at the Glen	Watkins Glen International	Watkins Glen, New York
32	November 3, 2007	2007	O'Reilly Challenge	Texas Motor Speedway	Fort Worth, Texas
33	March 21, 2009	2009	Scotts Turf Builder 300	Bristol Motor Speedway	Bristol, Tennessee
34	September 5, 2009	2009	Degree V12 300	Atlanta Motor Speedway	Hampton, Georgia
35	February 27, 2010	2010	Sam's Town 300	Las Vegas Motor Speedway	Las Vegas, Nevada
36	April 3, 2010	2010	Nashville 300	Nashville Superspeedway	Lebanon, Tennessee
37	September 10, 2010	2010	Virginia 529 College Savings 250	Richmond International Raceway	Richmond, Virginia
38	September 7, 2012	2012	Virginia 529 College Savings 250	Richmond International Raceway	Richmond, Virginia
39	November 3, 2012	2012	O'Reilly Auto Parts Challenge	Texas Motor Speedway	Fort Worth, Texas
40	August 31, 2013	2013	Great Clips/Grit Chips 300	Atlanta Motor Speedway	Hampton, Georgia
41	April 25, 2014	2014	ToyotaCare 250	Richmond International Raceway	Richmond, Virginia
42	June 27, 2014	2014	John R. Elliott HERO Campaign 300	Kentucky Speedway	Sparta, Kentucky
43	August 30, 2014	2014	Great Clips 300	Atlanta Motor Speedway	Hampton, Georgia
44	September 13, 2014	2014	Jimmy John's Freaky Fast 300	Chicagoland Speedway	Joliet, Illinois
45	February 28, 2015	2015	Hisense 250	Atlanta Motor Speedway	Hampton, Georgia
46	March 21, 2015	2015	Drive4Clots.com 300	Auto Club Speedway	Fontana, California
47	February 24, 2018	2018	Rinnai 250	Atlanta Motor Speedway	Hampton, Georgia

=== Camping World Truck Series ===
In the Camping World Truck Series, Harvick has won 14 races at 9 different tracks.

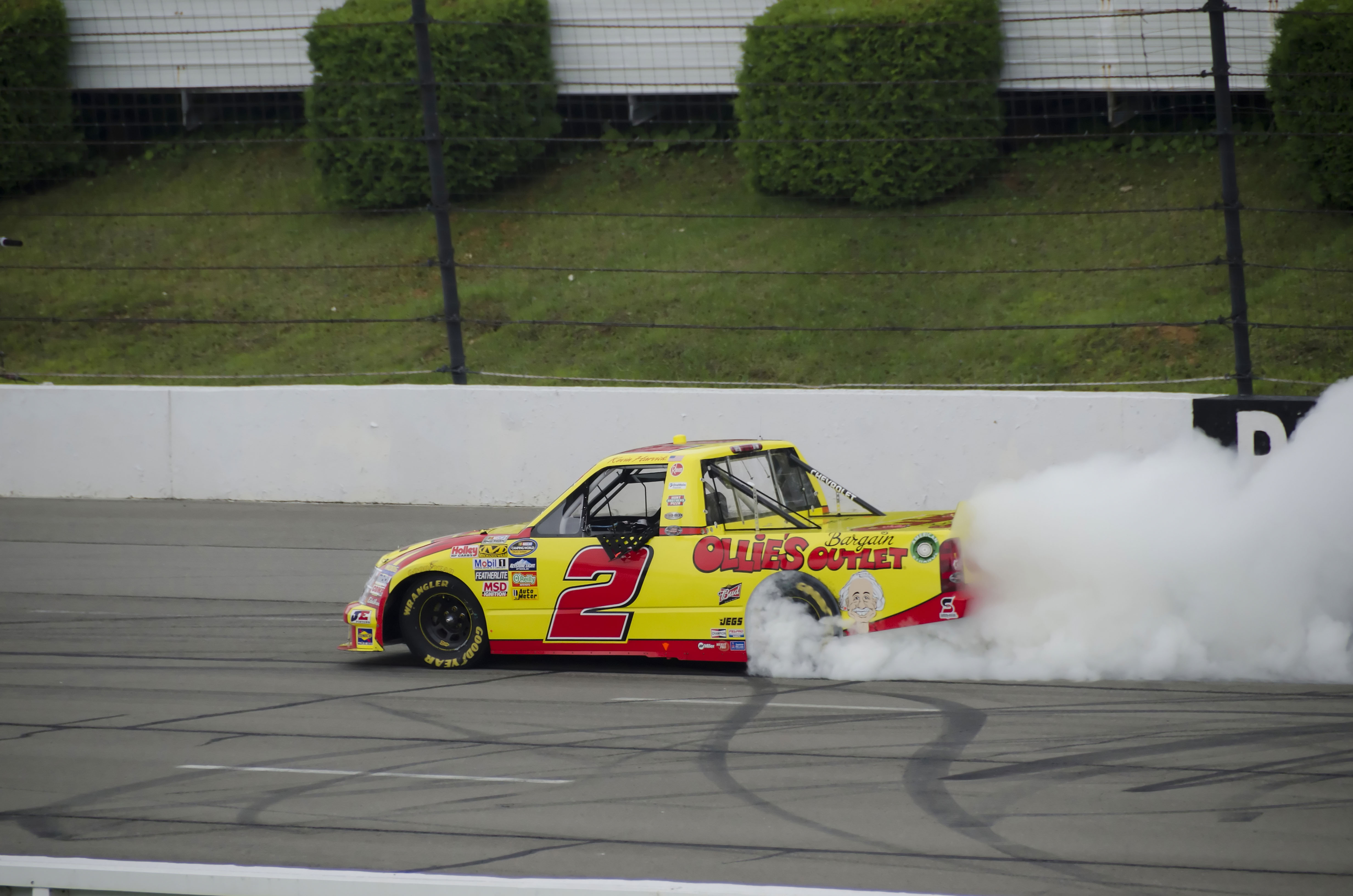
Harvick performing a burnout at the 2011 Good Sam RV Emergency Road Service 125

Camping World Truck Series victories
No.	Date	Season	Race	Track	Location
1	November 8, 2002	2002	Chevy Silverado 150	Phoenix International Raceway	Avondale, Arizona
2	October 31, 2003	2003	Chevy Silverado 150	Phoenix International Raceway	Avondale, Arizona
3	November 7, 2008	2008	Lucas Oil 150	Phoenix International Raceway	Avondale, Arizona
4	March 30, 2009	2009	Kroger 250	Martinsville Speedway	Ridgeway, Virginia
5	November 13, 2009	2009	Lucas Oil 150	Phoenix International Raceway	Avondale, Arizona
6	November 20, 2009	2009	Ford 200	Homestead-Miami Speedway	Homestead, Florida
7	March 6, 2010	2010	E-Z-Go 200	Atlanta Motor Speedway	Hampton, Georgia
8	March 27, 2010	2010	Kroger 250	Martinsville Speedway	Ridgeway, Virginia
9	July 17, 2010	2010	CampingWorld.com 200	Gateway International Raceway	Madison, Illinois
10	August 7, 2011	2011	Good Sam RV Emergency Road Service 125	Pocono Raceway	Long Pond, Pennsylvania
11	August 20, 2011	2011	VFW 200	Michigan International Speedway	Brooklyn, Michigan
12	August 24, 2011	2011	O'Reilly 200	Bristol Motor Speedway	Bristol, Tennessee
13	November 4, 2011	2011	WinStar World Casino 350K	Texas Motor Speedway	Fort Worth, Texas
14	March 31, 2012	2012	Kroger 250	Martinsville Speedway	Ridgeway, Virginia

=== K&N Pro Series West ===
In the K&N Pro Series West, Harvick, the 1998 champion, has won 7 races.

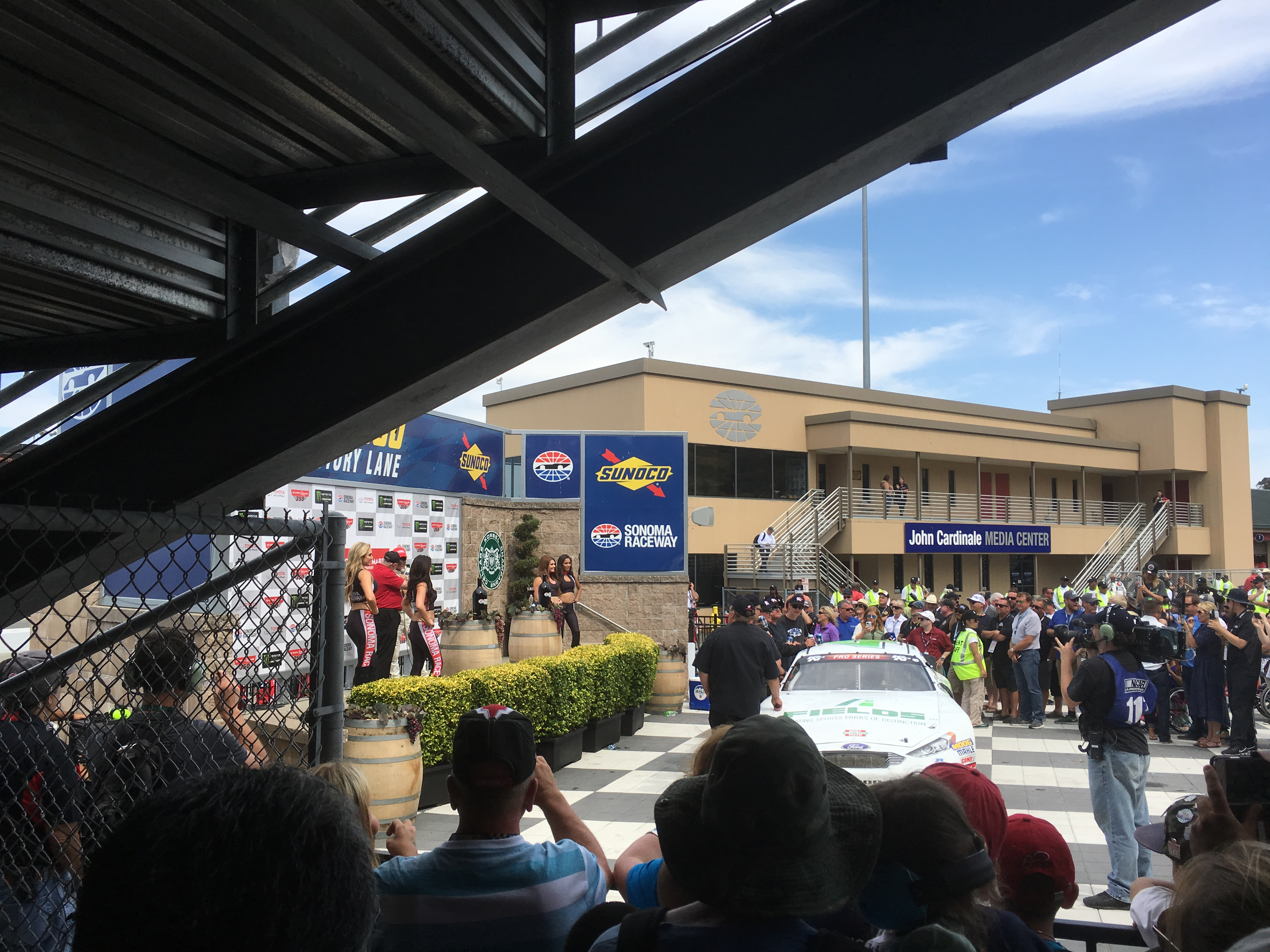
Harvick in victory lane at the 2017 Carneros 200

K&N Pro Series West victories
No.	Date	Season	Race	Track	Location	Ref
1	February 25, 1998	1998	Cactus Clash	Las Vegas Motor Speedway	Las Vegas, Nevada	
2	June 14, 1998	1998	Spears Manufacturing 200	Altamont Motorsports Park	Tracy, California	
3	July 18, 1998	1998	California 200	California Speedway	Fontana, California	
4	July 26, 1998	1998	Kidde Safety 200	Pikes Peak International Raceway	Fountain, Colorado	
5	October 11, 1998	1998	Iomega/Fry's 100	Sears Point Raceway	Sonoma, California	
6	May 20, 2007	2007	Featherlite Coaches 200	Iowa Speedway	Newton, Iowa	
7	June 24, 2017	2017	Carneros 200	Sonoma Raceway	Sonoma, California	

=== Autozone Southwest Series ===
In the Autozone Southwest Series, Harvick, has won 4 races.

Autozone Southwest Series victories
No.	Date	Season	Race	Track	Location
1	September 23, 1995	1995	Featherlite Manufacturing 125	Tucson Raceway Park	Tucson, Arizona
2	October 16, 1998	1998	Coors 200	Mesa Marin Raceway	Bakersfield, California
3	May 29, 1999	1999	Coors Memorial Day 125	Mesa Marin Raceway	Bakersfield, California
4	June 21, 2003	2003	Snap-On Tools/Jelly Belly 200	Infineon Raceway	Sonoma, California

== See also ==
- List of all-time NASCAR Cup Series winners
