= NASCAR O'Reilly Auto Parts Series =

Second national division of NASCAR

- Category: Stock cars
- Country: United States
- Inaugural season: 1982
- Manufacturers: Chevrolet · Ford · Toyota
- Engine suppliers: Chevrolet · Ford · Toyota
- Tire suppliers: Goodyear
- Drivers' champion: Justin Allgaier
- Makes' champion: Chevrolet
- Teams' champion: JR Motorsports
- Official website: NASCAR O'Reilly Auto Parts Series

The NASCAR O'Reilly Auto Parts Series (NOAPS) is a stock car racing series organized by NASCAR. It is the company's second national division, behind the NASCAR Cup Series and in front of NASCAR Truck Series. NOAPS events are frequently held as a support race on the day prior to a Cup Series event scheduled for that weekend.

The series was previously called the Budweiser Late Model Sportsman Series in 1982 and 1983, the NASCAR Busch Grand National Series from 1984 through 2002, the NASCAR Busch Series from 2003 through 2007, the NASCAR Nationwide Series from 2008 through 2014, and the NASCAR Xfinity Series from 2015 to 2025. Under the Xfinity name, it was sponsored by Comcast via its consumer cable and wireless brand. O'Reilly Auto Parts assumed title sponsorship in 2026.

== History ==
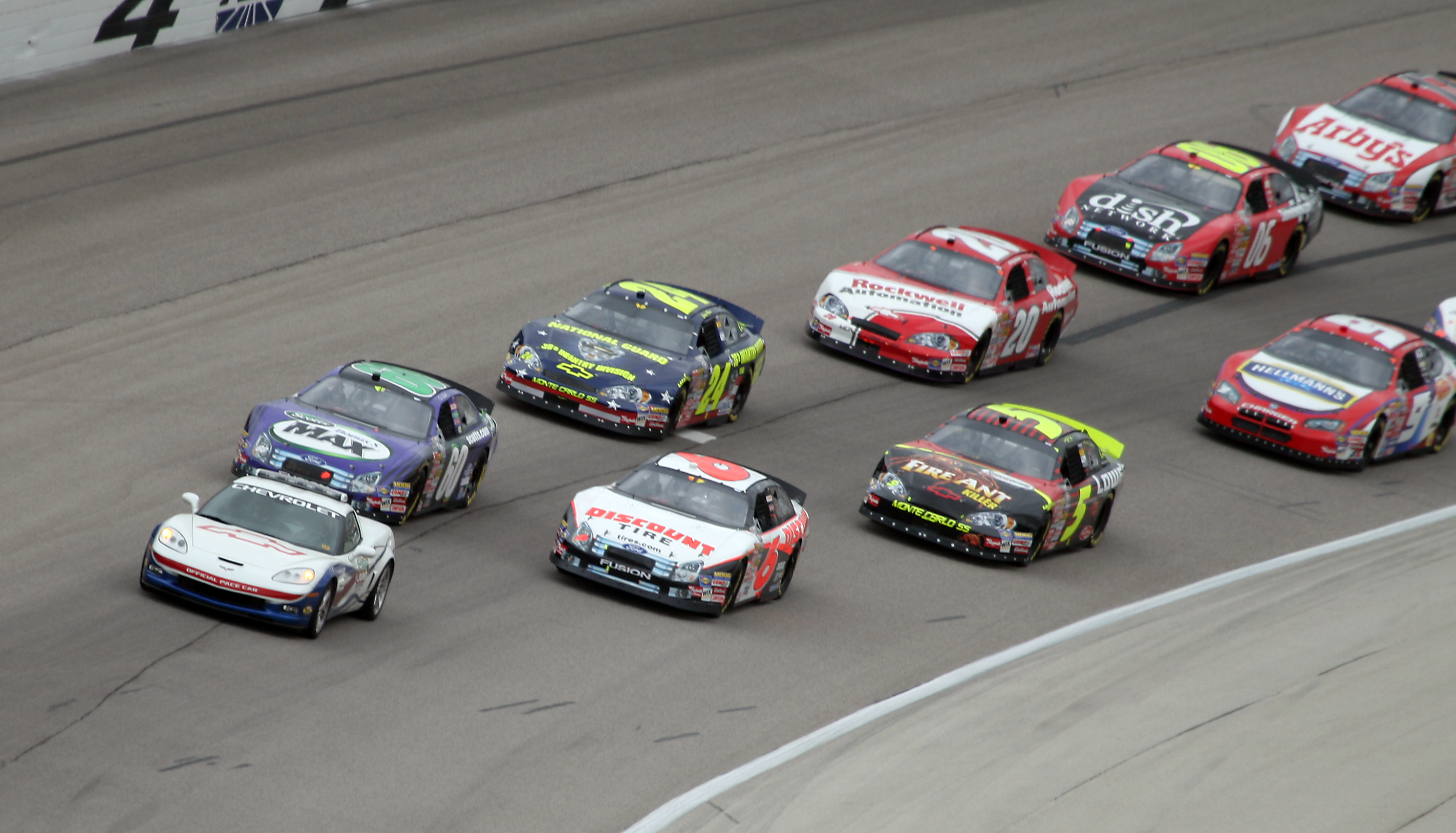
The Busch Series field following the pace car at Texas in April 2007

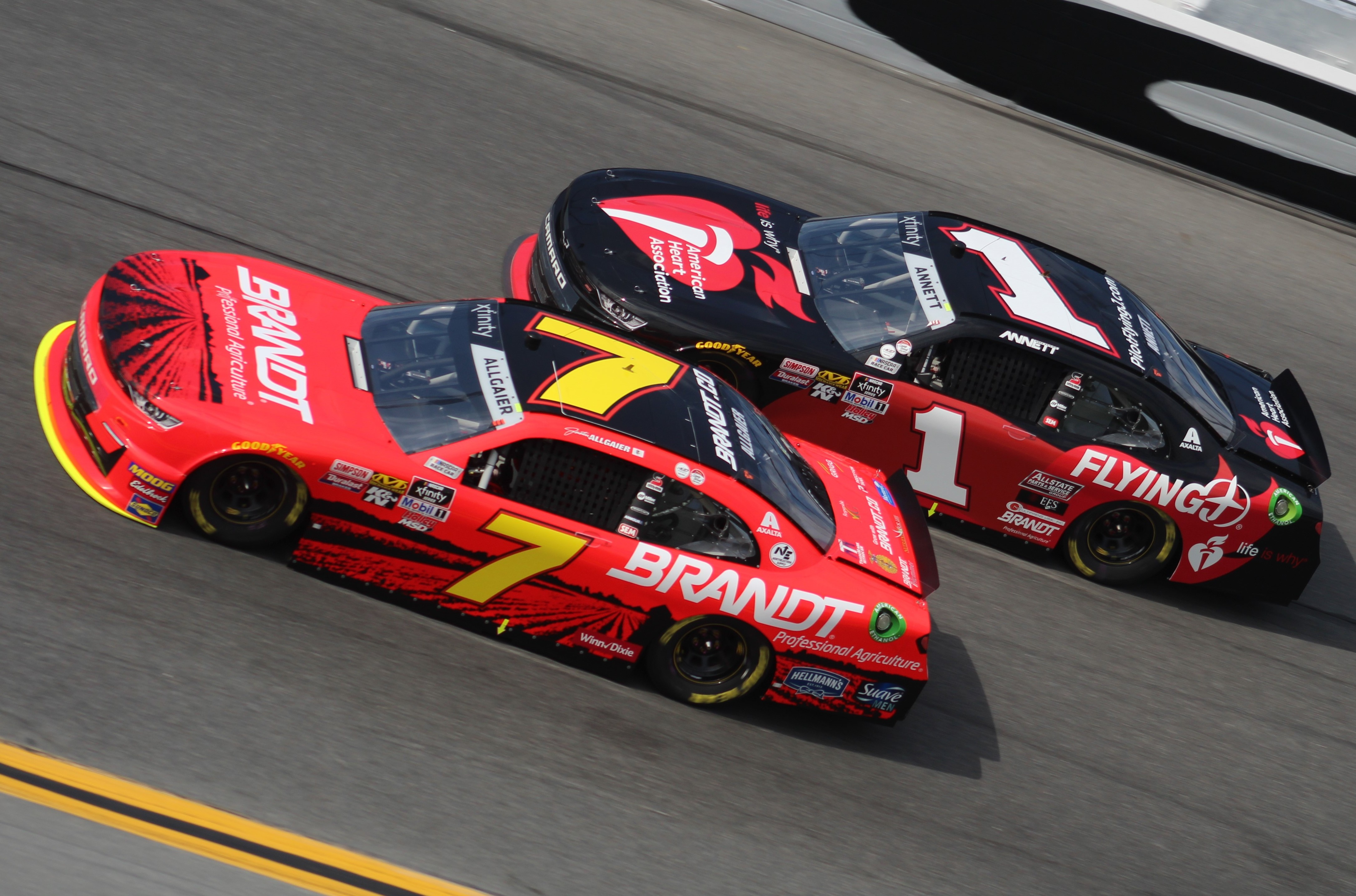
Justin Allgaier and Michael Annett in 2019

The series emerged from NASCAR's Sportsman division, which had been formed in 1950 as NASCAR's short track race division. It was NASCAR's fourth series (after the Modified and Roadster series in 1948 and Strictly Stock Series in 1949). The sportsman cars were not current model cars and could be modified more, but not as much as Modified series cars. It became the Late Model Sportsman Series in 1968, and soon featured races on larger tracks such as Daytona. Drivers used obsolete Grand National cars on larger tracks but by the inception of the touring format in 1982, the series used older compact cars. Short track cars with relatively small 300 cubic inch V-8 motors were used. Drivers used smaller current year models featuring V6 motors.

The modern-day O'Reilly Auto Parts Series was formed in 1982, when Anheuser-Busch sponsored a newly reformed late-model sportsman series with its Budweiser brand. In 1984, the series switched sponsorship to Anheuser-Busch's busch beer brand and was renamed the Busch Grand National Series.

"Grand National" was dropped from the series' title in 2003 as part of NASCAR's brand identity (the "Grand National" name was later used for the Busch East and Winston West series as part of a nationwide standardization of rules for NASCAR's regional racing; both series are now run under ARCA Menards Series banner after NASCAR purchased the organization in 2018). Anheuser-Busch dropped the sponsorship after the 2007 season; Nationwide Insurance took over the sponsorship for the 2008 season, renaming it the Nationwide Series. The Nationwide sponsorship was a seven-year contract, and did not include the banking and mortgage departments of Nationwide. The sponsorship reportedly carried a US$10 million commitment for 2008, with 6% annual escalations thereafter.

On September 3, 2014, it was announced that Comcast would become the new title sponsor of the series via its cable television and internet brand Xfinity, renaming it the Xfinity Series.

Logo of NASCAR Xfinity Series from 2015 to 2025

In 2016, NASCAR implemented a seven-race Chase system similar to the one used in the NASCAR Cup Series.

O'Reilly Auto Parts race fields have varied in the number of drivers. Prior to 2013, the grid size resembled its Cup counterpart with 43 cars per race; that year, it shrank to 40 maximum cars. The field was further reduced in 2019 and 2020 to 38 and 36, respectively. During the 2020 season, fields were temporarily increased to 40 cars again to accommodate part-time teams that were otherwise unable to qualify due to such sessions being canceled in the wake of the COVID-19 pandemic.

In February 2025, Comcast renewed its sponsorships of NASCAR, but dropped its sponsorship of the Xfinity Series after the 2025 season. The company elected to focus more on Xfinity's "Premier Partner" sponsorship for the Cup Series, as well as its sponsorship of the newly-introduced fastest lap award in the three national series. On August 18, 2025, NASCAR announced that O'Reilly Auto Parts would become the new title sponsor of the series beginning in the 2026 season, renaming it the O'Reilly Auto Parts Series.

== Races held outside the U.S. ==
On March 6, 2005, the series held its first race outside the United States, the Telcel Motorola 200. The race was held in Mexico City, Mexico at the Autódromo Hermanos Rodríguez, a track that has held Formula One and Champ Car races in the past. It was won by Martin Truex Jr. On August 4, 2007, the series held its second race outside the United States, at the Circuit Gilles Villeneuve in Montreal, Quebec, another road course. It was won by Kevin Harvick, while Quebec native Patrick Carpentier finished second. In July 2008, NASCAR announced that the Nationwide Series would not return to Mexico City in 2009, and in 2012 they announced that it would not be returning to Montreal in 2013. In 2025 the then-Xfinity Series returned to Mexico City where Mexican native Daniel Suárez won.

Date	Race name	Location	Track	Race winner
March 6, 2005	Telcel Motorola 200	Mexico City, Mexico	Autódromo Hermanos Rodríguez	(United States) Martin Truex Jr.
March 5, 2006	Telcel Motorola 200	Mexico City, Mexico	Autódromo Hermanos Rodríguez	(United States) Denny Hamlin
March 4, 2007	Telcel-Motorola Mexico 200	Mexico City, Mexico	Autódromo Hermanos Rodríguez	(Colombia) Juan Pablo Montoya
August 4, 2007	NAPA Auto Parts 200	Montreal, Canada	Circuit Gilles Villeneuve	(United States) Kevin Harvick
April 20, 2008	Corona México 200	Mexico City, Mexico	Autódromo Hermanos Rodríguez	(United States) Kyle Busch
August 2, 2008	NAPA Auto Parts 200	Montreal, Canada	Circuit Gilles Villeneuve	(Canada) Ron Fellows
August 30, 2009	NAPA Auto Parts 200	Montreal, Canada	Circuit Gilles Villeneuve	(United States) Carl Edwards
August 29, 2010	NAPA Auto Parts 200	Montreal, Canada	Circuit Gilles Villeneuve	(United States) Boris Said
August 20, 2011	NAPA Auto Parts 200	Montreal, Canada	Circuit Gilles Villeneuve	(Australia) Marcos Ambrose
August 18, 2012	NAPA Auto Parts 200	Montreal, Canada	Circuit Gilles Villeneuve	(United States) Justin Allgaier
June 14, 2025	The Chilango 150	Mexico City, Mexico	Autódromo Hermanos Rodríguez	(Mexico) Daniel Suárez

== Tracks ==
NASCAR O'Reilly Auto Parts Series tracks in 2027
Points paying races

}}

== The Chase ==
In 2026, the NOAPS and Craftsman Truck Series adopted a Chase format similar to the NASCAR Cup Series, which replaced the prior Playoff system used from 2016 to 2025. Unlike the Cup Series, whose Chase consists of ten races and 16 drivers, the O'Reilly Auto Parts Series Chase consists of nine races and 12 drivers. After the twenty-fourth race of the season, the top 12 drivers in points qualify for the Chase with the points set based on their regular season position:

- 1st place: 2,100 points
- 2nd place: 2,075 points (-25)
- 3rd place: 2,065 points (-10)
- 4th–12th place: -5 points per position (2,060 points, 2,055 points, etc. down to 2,020 points)

== Television broadcasting ==
=== United States ===
In the 1980s, races were sparsely shown, mainly by ESPN if they were covering the cup race at the same track. Starting in 1990, more races began to be shown. By the mid-1990s, all races were shown. Most standalone races were aired on TNN, which helped grow coverage of the series, while races that were companion races with Winston Cup dates mostly aired on the network airing the Cup race. TNN aired some of these races, which also aired on CBS, NBC, ESPN, ABC and TBS.

From 2001 until 2006, Fox Sports covered the entire first half of the Busch Grand National season, while NBC and TNT both aired races during the second half, with Turner Sports producing all the coverage for both networks. However, in even numbered years, coverage was changed, with the opening race at Daytona airing on NBC in 2004, on TNT in 2002 and 2006 (due to NBC's coverage of the Winter Olympics) and the track's July race airing on FX. Large portions of Fox's coverage aired on sister network FX, with a few marquee events on the network itself.

From 2007 until 2014, ESPN was the home of the renamed Nationwide Series. Generally four races per season aired on ABC, with the remainder on ESPN, ESPN2, and ESPNews. Early in ESPN's run, ESPN Classic was used for NNS overflow, however with less carriage of that network, this practice ended. Fox Sports returned to the series, airing the 2011 Bubba Burger 250 at Richmond on Speed Channel, as ESPN gave up its exclusive rights to the race because of programming conflicts.

In 2015, the NXS returned to Fox Sports during the first half of the season. Like the previous time Fox held rights to the series, most of the coverage aired on cable, though this time on FS1. Four races aired on Fox itself until 2019, when all races moved to FS1. The second half of the NXS season was televised by NBC Sports. Four to five races air on NBC itself, while the others air on NBCSN (until 2020) or, during the Olympics, CNBC or USA Network (prior to 2020). Since 2021, USA Network had carried all races not aired on NBC or Fox Sports.

On July 28, 2023, it was announced the O'Reilly Auto Parts Series will move exclusively to The CW in 2025 as part of a seven-year deal. It was then announced on April 11, 2024, that the move would begin a year early to broadcast the final eight races of the 2024 season.

=== Latin America ===
The NOAPS is available in most Latin American countries on cable and satellite TV. Since 2006, Fox Sports 3 (formerly called SPEED until 2013) carries live coverage of all events. The races are also shown on Fox Sports Latin America, some of them live and some tape-delayed depending on the network's schedule. Televisa Deportes also broadcast a 30-minute recap every Sunday morning on national television in Mexico. In Brazil, BandSports carries all three series. In Brazil, PicPay, a digital bank, acquired the rights to the three categories until 2027. The races are broadcast on its streaming platform called Phiztv, with coverage on the Motorsport.com channel, featuring the best NASCAR commentator in the country, Sergio Lago and Erick Gabriel.

=== Australia ===
Network 10's additional high-definition service, ONE, began broadcasting races from the NOAPS live or near live during the 2008 season. ONE continued to air highlights packages of each race until the end of 2014. Broadcasts of the series are now exclusively shown on the Fox Sports pay TV channels.

=== Canada ===
All races are live on TSN channels using The CW's coverage. Also, races are broadcast on RDS or RDS2 in French using the world feed produced by NASCAR.

=== Europe ===
In 2012, Motors TV broadcast all then-Xfinity races live, delayed and highlights, until 2018 when the channel ceased operations.

In Portugal, Sport TV broadcasts every O'Reilly Auto Parts race live.

In the United Kingdom, the O'Reilly Auto Parts races—in full and highlights—are available on Premier Sports 2.

=== Asia ===
All races are live on Sports Illustrated Television channels using FOX's or NBC's coverage with highlights on Fox Sports Asia.

== "Buschwhacking" ==
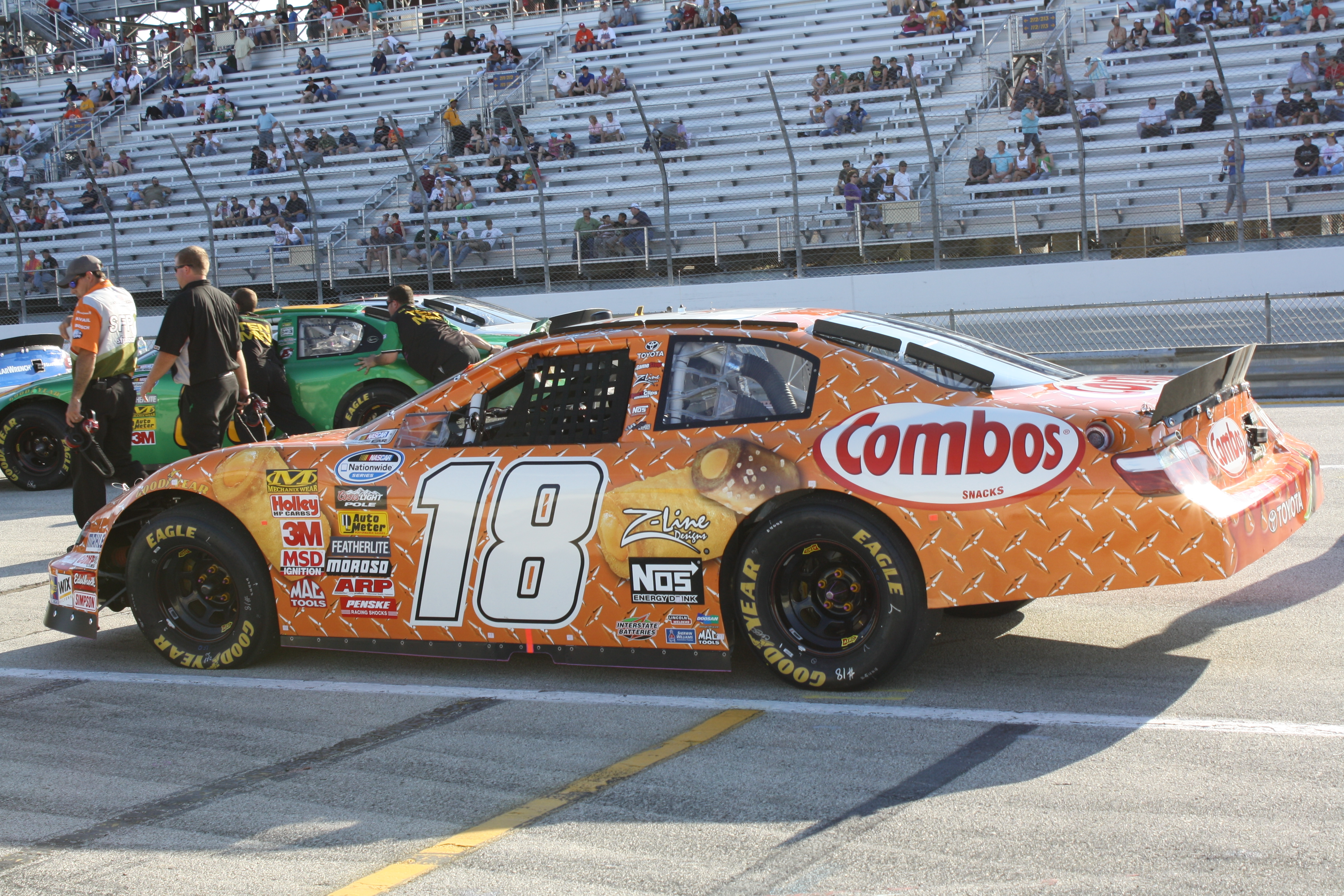
2009 Nationwide Series car of Cup Series regular Kyle Busch, who won the Nationwide Series championship that year. Busch won a total of 102 O'Reilly Auto Parts series races in his career, the most of any driver who has competed in the series.

Since the early days of the O'Reilly Auto Parts Series, many NASCAR Cup Series drivers have used their days off to drive in the NOAPS. This can be for any number of reasons, most prominent or often claimed is to gain more "seat time", or to familiarize themselves with the track. Examples of this would be Dale Earnhardt, who won the very first NOAPS race, and Kyle Busch, who won the most races in NOAPS history.

In recent years, this practice had been dubbed "Buschwhacking" by its detractors. The colloquialism originated when Anheuser-Busch was the main sponsor of the series by combining the name "Busch" with the term "Buschwhacker," but it has gradually fallen out of use since Anheuser-Busch's sponsorship ended. Other nicknames, such as Claim Jumper (for when Nationwide was the series sponsor), and Signal Pirate (for the former sponsor Xfinity) have never really caught on, although the generic term "Cup leech" is often used after the end of Busch sponsorship.

Critics claim that NASCAR Cup Series drivers racing in the NOAPS take away opportunities from the NOAPS regulars, usually younger and less experienced drivers. On the other hand, many fans claim that without the NASCAR Cup Series stars and the large amount of fan interest they attract on their own races, the NOAPS would be inadequate as a top national division. In addition, many NOAPS drivers have welcomed the Cup drivers because it gives them the opportunity to drive with more seasoned veterans.

In 2007, the NASCAR Cup Series began racing with the Car of Tomorrow, a radically new specification different from the NOAPS. NASCAR Cup Series drivers have admitted that driving the O'Reilly Auto Parts car the day before the race does little to help with the NASCAR Cup Series race, as the cars differ greatly. This loosely resulted in the new Nationwide Series car making its debut in the 2010 Subway Jalapeño 250 at Daytona International Speedway. This car has a set-up closer to the current Cup car and some Cup drivers who have tested the car say it has similar handling characteristics. The new car has gone full-time since the 2011 season. In 2007, six out of the top ten drivers in the final point standings were Cup regulars, with Jason Leffler being the only non-Cup driver in that group to win a race in 2007. This number decreased from 2006 when 8 out of 10 drivers were Cup regulars. The decreased number is attributed to Cup regulars running only partial schedules, allowing for more NOAPS regulars to reach the top ten in points. However, the champions from 2006 to 2010 were all Cup regulars driving the full series schedule (Kevin Harvick, Carl Edwards, Clint Bowyer, Kyle Busch, and Brad Keselowski). As a result, beginning with the 2011 season, NASCAR implemented a rule stating that drivers could only compete for the drivers' championship in one of three national series (Cup, O'Reilly Auto Parts, and Truck) of the drivers' choosing.

On October 26, 2016, NASCAR announced plans to limit Cup participation in the lower series starting in 2017. Cup drivers who were competing for points in the Cup Series with at least five years of experience in the series would be allowed to compete in up to 10 NOAPS races, but are banned from racing in the series' regular season finale, Playoff, and Dash 4 Cash races.

== O'Reilly Auto Parts Series cars ==
In the early 1980s, teams were switching from the General Motors 1971–77 X-Body compact cars with 311-cubic inch engines. Later, teams were using General Motors 1982–87 G-body cars. Ford teams have used the Thunderbird cars consistently.

In 1989, NASCAR changed rules requiring cars to use current body styles, similar to the Cup cars. However, the cars still used V6 engines. The cars gradually became similar to Cup cars.

In 1995, changes were made. The series switched to V-8s with a compression ratio of 9:1 (as opposed to 14:1 for Cup at the time). The vehicle weight with driver was set at 3,300 pounds (as opposed to 3,400 for Cup). The body style changes, as well as the introduction of V-8s, made the two series' cars increasingly similar.

The suspensions, brake systems, transmissions, were identical between the two series, but The Car of Tomorrow eliminates some of these commonalities. The Car of Tomorrow is taller and wider than the Generation 4-based vehicles in the then-Nationwide Series, and until 2010, it utilized a front "splitter", opposed to a front valance. The Car of Tomorrow also set pole speeds slower than the NOAPS cars at companion races.

Previously, Busch Series cars used fuel that contained lead. NASCAR conducted a three-race test of unleaded gasoline in this series that began on July 29, 2006, with a race at Gateway. The fuel, Sunoco GT 260 Unleaded, became mandatory in all series starting with the second weekend of the 2007 series, with Daytona being the last race weekend using leaded gasoline.

Another distinction between the cars started in 2008: Goodyear had developed a rain tire for NASCAR road course racing in both series but NASCAR had yet to use them under race conditions by the time NASCAR abandoned the program for the Cup Series in 2005 (the Cup Series eventually used rain tires at the 2020 Bank of America Roval 400 and 2021 EchoPark Texas Grand Prix), but the Busch Series continued to use rain tires in races at Autódromo Hermanos Rodríguez and Circuit Gilles Villeneuve, since the races could not be planned with rain dates. When rain started to fall at the 2008 NAPA Auto Parts 200, the tires were used in the rain for the first time.

Another distinction was added in 2012, when NASCAR changed the fuel delivery system in the Cup cars from carburetion to fuel injection. NOAPS cars continue to use carburetors. Furthermore, with the Cup Series' switch to Next Gen car in 2022, O'Reilly Auto Parts cars (as well as Truck Series vehicles) continue to use traditional five-lug steel wheels and centered door numbers, as opposed to an aluminum center lock wheel and numbers being placed behind the front wheel on the Next Gen.

=== Specifications for Generation 4 NOAPS car ===
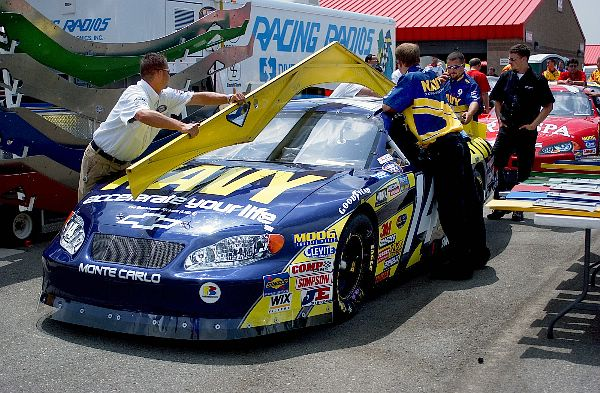
NASCAR officials use a template to inspect Casey Atwood's 2004 Chevrolet Monte Carlo.

- Chassis: Steel tube frame with integral safety roll cage – must meet NASCAR standards
- Engine displacement: 5,860 cc (358 cu in) Pushrod V8
- Transmission: 4-speed manual
- Weight: 3,200 lb (1,451 kg) minimum (without driver); 3,400 lb (1,542 kg) minimum (with driver)
- Power output: 650–700 hp (485–522 kW) unrestricted, ≈450 hp (335 kW) restricted
- Torque: 700 N⋅m (520 ft⋅lb)
- Fuel: 90 MON, 98 RON, 94 AKI unleaded gasoline provided by Sunoco 85% + Sunoco Green Ethanol E15
- Fuel capacity: 18 US gallons (68 litres)
- Fuel delivery: Carburetion
- Compression ratio: 12:1
- Aspiration: Naturally aspirated
- Carburetor size: 390 ft^{3}/min (184 L/s) 4 barrel
- Wheelbase: 105 in (2,667 mm)
- Steering: Power, recirculating ball
- Tires: Slick (all tracks) and rain tires (road courses only if in case of rainy conditions) provided by Goodyear Eagle
- Length: 203.75 in (5,175 mm)
- Width: 75 in (1,905 mm)
- Height: 51 in (1,295 mm)
- Safety equipment: HANS device, seat belt 6-point supplied by Willans

=== Xfinity "Car of Tomorrow" (CoT) ===
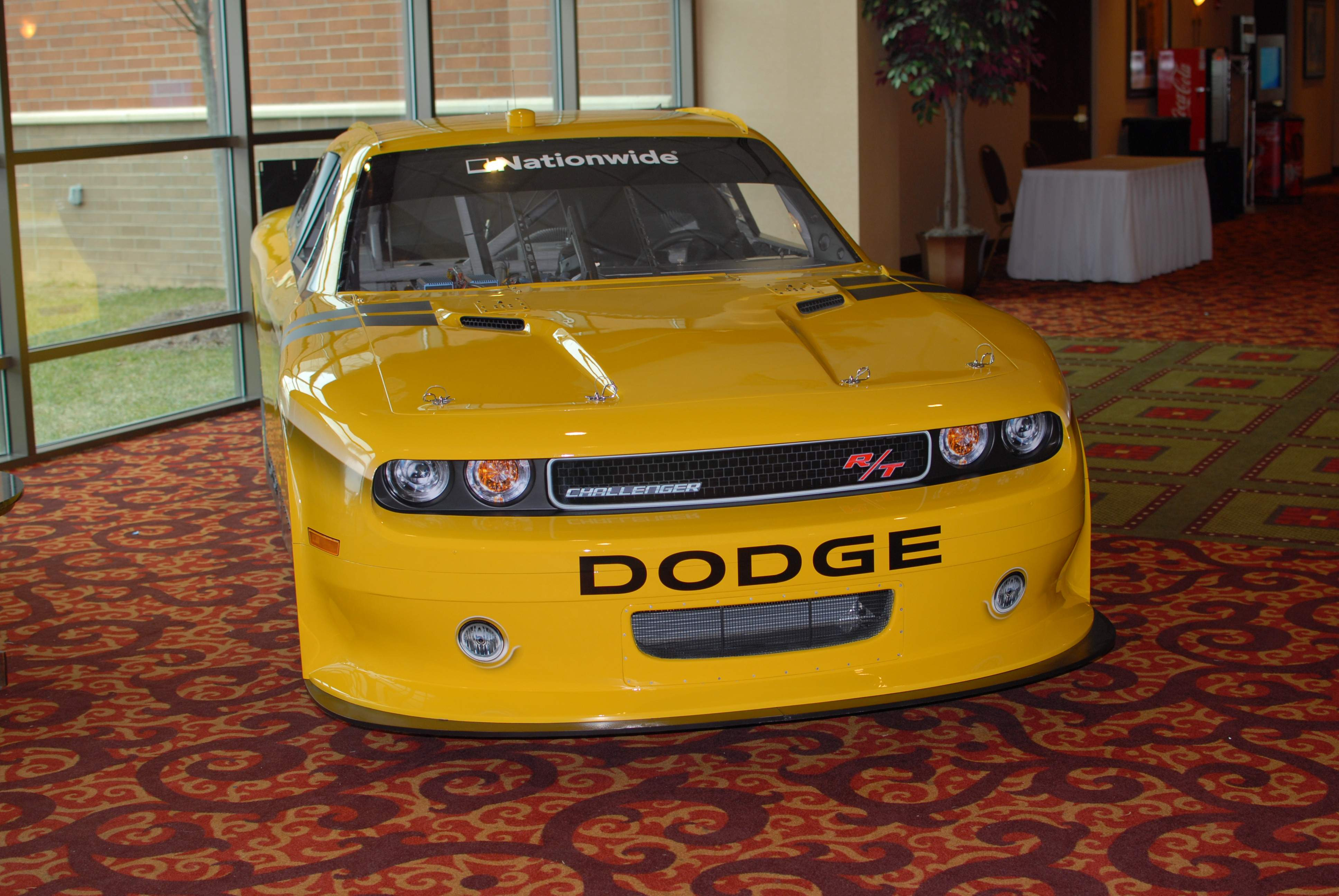
2010 Nationwide Car of Tomorrow

The then Nationwide Series unveiled its "Car of Tomorrow" (CoT) at the July 2010 race at Daytona. Before being fully integrated in the 2011 season, it was also used in 2010 races at Michigan, Richmond and Charlotte. The Xfinity CoT has important differences from the NASCAR Cup Series CoT, and the now-retired Generation 4 style car. The body and aerodynamic package differs from the NASCAR Cup Series cars, marketing American pony cars from the 1960s such as the Ford Mustang, Dodge Challenger, and Chevrolet Camaro. The change to share the same CoT chassis as the Cup series resulted in the wheelbase being lengthened from 105 to 110 inches

Each manufacturer uses a distinct body design (similar to 1960s muscle cars), built within strict aerodynamic guidelines provided by NASCAR. The Chevrolet car body currently resembles the SS, after initially running the Impala and then the Zeta-based Camaro (which coincided with GM's Cup car being its four-door Zeta counterpart, the Holden VF Commodore-based Chevrolet SS, being used in Cup at the time); Camaro branding was removed after 2024 due to Chevrolet discontinuing the car, though it remains eligible under NASCAR homologation rules. Ford uses the Mustang Dark Horse. Toyota runs the Camry, reconfigured in 2015 to resemble the current production model. Toyota announced they would be running the GR Supra starting in 2019, replacing the Camry, which had been run in the series since Toyota joined the Xfinity Series in 2007. Dodge teams used the Challenger R/T model, despite the manufacturer pulling all factory support after 2012 (though it continued in Canada as FCA Canada supported the Pinty's Series until 2020). Following Dodge's exit, smaller underfunded teams continued to run second-hand Challenger chassis without factory support (thus earning the nickname "Zombie Dodges"). As a result of a rules change after the 2018 season, all Challenger bodies were rendered ineligible for competition, as the series made the switch to composite body panels. Since FCA had pulled factory support years earlier, no new body was submitted for competition, ending the possibility of running a Challenger body in the series.

== Manufacturer representation ==
=== Budweiser Late Model Sportsman Series (1982–1983) ===
Chrysler

- Dodge Challenger: 1982–1983

Ford

- Ford Fairmont: 1982–1983

General Motors

- Chevrolet Malibu: 1982–1983
- Oldsmobile Omega: 1982–1983
- Pontiac Ventura: 1982–1983

=== Busch Grand National Series (1984–2002) ===
Chrysler

- Dodge Challenger: 1984–1986
- Dodge Intrepid: 2002

Ford

- Ford Fairmont: 1984–1986
- Ford Thunderbird: 1987–1997
- Ford Taurus: 1998–2002
- Mercury Cougar: 1984

General Motors

- Buick Regal: 1985, 1988–1995 (no factory support after 1991)
- Buick LeSabre: 1986–1989
- Chevrolet Monte Carlo: 1986–1990, 1995–2002 (no factory support after 1989 for the first stint)
- Chevrolet Nova: 1984–1988
- Chevrolet Lumina: 1989–1995 (no factory support after 1994)
- Oldsmobile Omega: 1984–1987
- Oldsmobile 88: 1986–1987
- Oldsmobile Cutlass Supreme: 1988–1995 (no factory support after 1992)
- Pontiac Ventura: 1984–1987
- Pontiac Grand Prix: 1988–2002

=== Busch Series (2003–2007) ===
Chrysler

- Dodge Intrepid: 2003–2005 (no car branding in 2004; no factory support after 2004)
- Dodge Charger: 2005–2007

Ford

- Ford Taurus: 2003–2007 (no factory support after 2005)
- Ford Fusion: 2006–2007

General Motors

- Pontiac Grand Prix: 2003–2005 (no factory support after 2003)
- Chevrolet Monte Carlo: 2003–2007 (no factory support after 2005)
- Chevrolet Monte Carlo SS: 2006–2007

Toyota

- Toyota Camry: 2007

=== Nationwide Series (2008–2014) ===
Chrysler

- Dodge Charger: 2008–2010
- Dodge Challenger R/T: 2010–2014 (no factory support after 2012)

Ford

- Ford Fusion: 2008–2010
- Ford Mustang GT: 2010–2014

General Motors

- Chevrolet Monte Carlo SS: 2008-2010 (no factory support after 2008)
- Chevrolet Impala SS: 2009–2010
- Chevrolet Impala: 2010–2013 (no factory support in 2013)
- Chevrolet Camaro SS: 2013–2014

Toyota

- Toyota Camry: 2008–2014

=== Xfinity Series (2015–2025) ===
Logo from 2022 to 2025.

FCA US (Chrysler)

- Dodge Challenger R/T: 2015–2018 (no factory support)

Ford

- Ford Mustang GT: 2015–2023
- Ford Mustang Dark Horse: 2024–2025

General Motors

- Chevrolet Camaro SS: 2015–2025 (no Camaro branding after 2024)

Toyota

- Toyota Camry: 2015–2020 (no factory support after 2018)
- Toyota GR Supra: 2019–2025

=== O'Reilly Auto Parts Series (2026–present) ===
Ford

- Ford Mustang Dark Horse: 2026–

General Motors

- Chevrolet Camaro SS: 2026–

Toyota

- Toyota GR Supra: 2026–

== Seasons ==
Year	Races	Champion	Manufacturers' Champion	Owners' Champion	Rookie of the Year	Most Popular Driver
Budweiser Late Model Sportsman Series
1982	29	Jack Ingram	Pontiac	No. 11 Ingram Racing	Not awarded	Jack Ingram
1983	35	Sam Ard	Oldsmobile	No. 00 Thomas Brothers Racing	Not awarded	Sam Ard
Busch Grand National Series
1984	29	Sam Ard	Pontiac	No. 00 Thomas Brothers Racing	Not awarded	Sam Ard
1985	27	Jack Ingram	Pontiac	No. 11 Ingram Racing	Not awarded	Jimmy Hensley
1986	31	Larry Pearson	Pontiac	No. 21 Pearson Racing	Not awarded	Brett Bodine
1987	27	Larry Pearson	Chevrolet	No. 21 Pearson Racing	Not awarded	Jimmy Hensley
1988	30	Tommy Ellis	Buick	No. 99 J&J Racing	Not awarded	Larry Pearson
1989	29	Rob Moroso	Buick	No. 25 Moroso Racing	Kenny Wallace	Rob Moroso
1990	31	Chuck Bown	Buick	No. 63 HVP Motorsports	Joe Nemechek	**Bobby Labonte**
1991	27	**Bobby Labonte**	Oldsmobile	No. 44 Labonte Motorsports	**Jeff Gordon**	Kenny Wallace
1992	30	Joe Nemechek	Chevrolet	No. 87 NEMCO Motorsports	Ricky Craven	Joe Nemechek
1993	28	Steve Grissom	Chevrolet	No. 31 Grissom Racing Enterprises	Hermie Sadler	Joe Nemechek
1994	28	David Green	Chevrolet	No. 44 Labonte Motorsports	Johnny Benson Jr.	Kenny Wallace
Busch Series Grand National Division
1995	26	Johnny Benson Jr.	Ford	No. 74 BACE Motorsports	Jeff Fuller	Chad Little
1996	26	Randy LaJoie	Chevrolet	No. 74 BACE Motorsports	Glenn Allen Jr.	David Green
1997	30	Randy LaJoie	Chevrolet	No. 74 BACE Motorsports	Steve Park	Mike McLaughlin
1998	31	Dale Earnhardt Jr.	Chevrolet	No. 3 Dale Earnhardt, Inc.	Andy Santerre	Buckshot Jones
1999	32	Dale Earnhardt Jr.	Chevrolet	No. 3 Dale Earnhardt, Inc.	Tony Raines	Dale Earnhardt Jr.
2000	32	Jeff Green	Chevrolet	No. 10 ppc Racing	**Kevin Harvick**	Ron Hornaday Jr.
2001	33	**Kevin Harvick**	Chevrolet	No. 2 Richard Childress Racing	Greg Biffle	**Kevin Harvick**
2002	34	Greg Biffle	Ford	No. 60 Roush Racing	Scott Riggs	Greg Biffle
2003	34	Brian Vickers	Chevrolet	No. 21 Richard Childress Racing	David Stremme	Scott Riggs
Busch Series
2004	34	**Martin Truex Jr.**	Chevrolet	No. 8 Chance 2 Motorsports	**Kyle Busch**	**Martin Truex Jr.**
2005	35	**Martin Truex Jr.**	Chevrolet	No. 8 Chance 2 Motorsports	Carl Edwards	**Martin Truex Jr.**
2006	35	**Kevin Harvick**	Chevrolet	No. 21 Richard Childress Racing	Danny O'Quinn Jr.	Kenny Wallace
2007	35	Carl Edwards	Chevrolet	No. 29 Richard Childress Racing	David Ragan	Carl Edwards
Nationwide Series
2008	35	Clint Bowyer	Toyota	No. 20 Joe Gibbs Racing	Landon Cassill	**Brad Keselowski**
2009	35	**Kyle Busch**	Toyota	No. 18 Joe Gibbs Racing	Justin Allgaier	**Brad Keselowski**
2010	35	**Brad Keselowski**	Toyota	No. 18 Joe Gibbs Racing	Ricky Stenhouse Jr.	**Brad Keselowski**
2011	34	Ricky Stenhouse Jr.	Ford	No. 60 Roush Fenway Racing	Timmy Hill	Elliott Sadler
2012	33	Ricky Stenhouse Jr.	Chevrolet	No. 18 Joe Gibbs Racing	Austin Dillon	Danica Patrick
2013	33	Austin Dillon	Ford	No. 22 Team Penske	**Kyle Larson**	Regan Smith
2014	33	**Chase Elliott**	Chevrolet	No. 22 Team Penske	**Chase Elliott**	**Chase Elliott**
Xfinity Series
2015	33	Chris Buescher	Chevrolet	No. 22 Team Penske	Daniel Suárez	**Chase Elliott**
2016	33	Daniel Suárez	Toyota	No. 19 Joe Gibbs Racing	Erik Jones	Elliott Sadler
2017	33	William Byron	Chevrolet	No. 22 Team Penske	William Byron	Elliott Sadler
2018	33	Tyler Reddick	Chevrolet	No. 00 Stewart-Haas Racing	Tyler Reddick	Elliott Sadler
2019	33	Tyler Reddick	Chevrolet	No. 2 Richard Childress Racing	Chase Briscoe	Justin Allgaier
2020	33	Austin Cindric	Chevrolet	No. 22 Team Penske	Harrison Burton	Justin Allgaier
2021	33	Daniel Hemric	Chevrolet	No. 22 Team Penske	Ty Gibbs	Justin Allgaier
2022	33	Ty Gibbs	Chevrolet	No. 54 Joe Gibbs Racing	Austin Hill	Noah Gragson
2023	33	Cole Custer	Chevrolet	No. 00 Stewart–Haas Racing	Sammy Smith	Justin Allgaier
2024	33	Justin Allgaier	Chevrolet	No. 7 JR Motorsports	Jesse Love	Justin Allgaier
2025	33	Jesse Love	Chevrolet	No. 19 Joe Gibbs Racing	Connor Zilisch	Justin Allgaier
O'Reilly Auto Parts Series
2026	33	Justin Allgaier	Chevrolet	No. 7 JR Motorsports	Brent Crews	Justin Allgaier

- Driver in **bold** has won at least one NASCAR Cup Series championship
- Driver in italics has won at least one NASCAR Truck Series championship

== All-time win table ==
All figures correct as of the O'Reilly Auto Parts 300 at Homestead–Miami Speedway (November 7, 2026).

Key
*	NASCAR O'Reilly Auto Parts Series Champion
#	Driver is competing full-time in the 2026 season
°	Driver is competing part-time in the 2026 season
^	Driver has been inducted into the NASCAR Hall of Fame

Rank	Driver	Wins
1	Kyle Busch *	102
2	Mark Martin ^	49
3	Kevin Harvick * ^	47
4	Brad Keselowski *	39
5	Carl Edwards * ^	38
6	Justin Allgaier # *	34
7	Jack Ingram * ^	31
8	Joey Logano	30
9	Matt Kenseth ^	29
10	Jeff Burton ^	27
11	Dale Earnhardt Jr. * ^	24
11	Tommy Houston	24
13	Sam Ard *	22
13	Tommy Ellis *	22
15	Dale Earnhardt ^	21
15	Harry Gant ^	21
17	Greg Biffle *	20
18	Christopher Bell °	19
18	Kyle Larson °	19
20	A. J. Allmendinger	18
20	Denny Hamlin	18
22	Jeff Green *	16
22	Austin Hill #	16
22	Joe Nemechek *	16
25	Todd Bodine	15
25	Cole Custer * °	15
25	Randy LaJoie *	15
25	Larry Pearson *	15
25	Morgan Shepherd	15
30	Austin Cindric *	13
30	Noah Gragson	13
30	Elliott Sadler	13
30	Martin Truex Jr. *	13
30	Darrell Waltrip ^	13
30	Connor Zilisch °	13
36	Ty Gibbs *	12
36	Jimmy Spencer	12
38	Chuck Bown *	11
38	Chase Briscoe	11
38	Steve Grissom *	11
38	Dale Jarrett ^	11
38	Terry Labonte ^	11
38	John Hunter Nemechek	11
38	Tony Stewart ^	11
38	Michael Waltrip	11
46	Aric Almirola	10
46	Jason Keller	10
46	Bobby Labonte * ^	10
46	Robert Pressley	10
46	Tyler Reddick *	10
51	Austin Dillon *	9
51	David Green *	9
51	Jimmy Hensley	9
51	Brandon Jones #	9
51	Erik Jones	9
51	Rick Mast	9
51	Kenny Wallace	9
58	Clint Bowyer *	8
58	Kasey Kahne	8
58	Sam Mayer #	8
58	Jamie McMurray	8
58	Ricky Stenhouse Jr. *	8
63	Ryan Blaney	7
63	Ryan Newman	7
65	Geoff Bodine	6
65	Chase Elliott * °	6
65	Butch Lindley	6
65	Chad Little	6
65	Mike McLaughlin	6
65	Rob Moroso *	6
65	Regan Smith	6
65	Shane van Gisbergen °	6
65	Scott Wimmer	6
74	Marcos Ambrose	5
74	Josh Berry	5
74	Brett Bodine	5
74	Kurt Busch ^	5
74	William Byron * °	5
74	Jeff Gordon ^	5
74	Bobby Hamilton Jr.	5
74	Sam Hornish Jr.	5
74	Jesse Love * #	5
83	Harrison Burton #	4
83	Ward Burton	4
83	Ricky Craven	4
83	Corey Day #	4
83	Tim Fedewa	4
83	Ron Fellows	4
83	Justin Haley	4
83	Ron Hornaday Jr. ^	4
83	Jeff Purvis	4
83	Scott Riggs	4
83	Sammy Smith #	4
83	Reed Sorenson	4
83	Daniel Suárez *	4
83	Mike Wallace	4
97	Johnny Benson Jr. *	3
97	Chris Buescher *	3
97	Ross Chastain °	3
97	Sheldon Creed #	3
97	Riley Herbst °	3
97	Ernie Irvan	3
97	Carson Kvapil #	3
97	Paul Menard	3
97	L. D. Ottinger	3
97	Steve Park	3
97	Johnny Sauter	3
97	Chandler Smith	3
97	Ryan Truex	3
97	Brian Vickers *	3
111	Mike Alexander	2
111	Bobby Allison ^	2
111	Casey Atwood	2
111	Trevor Bayne	2
111	Mike Bliss	2
111	Ron Bouchard	2
111	Jeb Burton #	2
111	Jeremy Clements #	2
111	Brendan Gaughan	2
111	Taylor Gray #	2
111	Bobby Hillin Jr.	2
111	Buckshot Jones	2
111	Jason Leffler	2
111	Kevin Lepage	2
111	Sterling Marlin	2
111	Butch Miller	2
111	Hank Parker Jr.	2
111	Phil Parsons	2
111	Ryan Preece	2
111	David Ragan	2
111	Ryan Reed	2
111	Tim Richmond	2
111	Johnny Rumley	2
111	Hermie Sadler	2
111	Elton Sawyer	2
111	Ken Schrader	2
111	Dennis Setzer	2
111	Ronnie Silver	2
111	Dick Trickle	2
111	Rick Wilson	2
141	Michael Annett	1
141	Jamie Aube	1
141	Ed Berrier	1
141	Joe Bessey	1
141	Dave Blaney	1
141	Neil Bonnett	1
141	Alex Bowman °	1
141	Brandon Brown	1
141	James Buescher	1
141	Ronald Cooper	1
141	Derrike Cope	1
141	Ty Dillon	1
141	Bobby Dotter	1
141	Bill Elliott ^	1
141	Jeff Fuller	1
141	Spencer Gallagher	1
141	David Gilliland	1
141	Robby Gordon	1
141	Bobby Hamilton	1
141	Daniel Hemric *	1
141	Jimmie Johnson ^	1
141	Justin Labonte	1
141	Stephen Leicht	1
141	Tracy Leslie	1
141	Justin Marks	1
141	Dick McCabe	1
141	Michael McDowell	1
141	Casey Mears	1
141	Juan Pablo Montoya	1
141	David Pearson ^	1
141	Nelson Piquet Jr.	1
141	Larry Pollard	1
141	David Reutimann	1
141	Ricky Rudd ^	1
141	Joe Ruttman	1
141	Greg Sacks	1
141	Boris Said	1
141	Nick Sanchez °	1
141	Andy Santerre	1
141	William Sawalich #	1
141	John Settlemyre	1
141	Ryan Sieg #	1
141	Mike Skinner	1
141	Myatt Snider	1
141	Jack Sprague	1
141	Brad Teague	1

=== Drivers with most wins on active O'Reilly series tracks ===
Track	Driver(s) with the most wins	# Of Wins
Bristol Motor Speedway	Kyle Busch	9
Charlotte Motor Speedway	Kyle Busch	9
Chicagoland Speedway	Kyle Busch	4
Circuit of the Americas	A. J. Allmendinger	2
Coronado Street Course	Austin Hill	1
Darlington Raceway	Mark Martin	8
Daytona International Speedway	Dale Earnhardt and Tony Stewart	7
Dover Motor Speedway	Kyle Busch	5
EchoPark Speedway	Kevin Harvick and Austin Hill	5
Homestead–Miami Speedway	Joe Nemechek	3
Indianapolis Motor Speedway	Kyle Busch	4
Iowa Speedway	Brad Keselowski and Ricky Stenhouse Jr.	3
Kansas Speedway	Kyle Busch	4
Las Vegas Motor Speedway	Mark Martin	4
Martinsville Speedway	Sam Ard	5
Nashville Superspeedway	Carl Edwards	5
Phoenix Raceway	Kyle Busch	11
Pocono Raceway	Cole Custer	2
Rockingham Speedway	Mark Martin	5
Sonoma Raceway	Shane van Gisbergen	2
Talladega Superspeedway	Martin Truex Jr.	3
Texas Motor Speedway	Kyle Busch	10
Watkins Glen International	Marcos Ambrose and Terry Labonte	4
World Wide Technology Raceway	Carl Edwards	3

== See also ==
- List of auto racing tracks in the United States
- List of NASCAR series
- List of NASCAR teams
- List of NASCAR O'Reilly Auto Parts Series champions
- Dash 4 Cash
- NASCAR Truck Series
- NASCAR Cup Series
