= 2005 Telcel Motorola 200 =

Race details
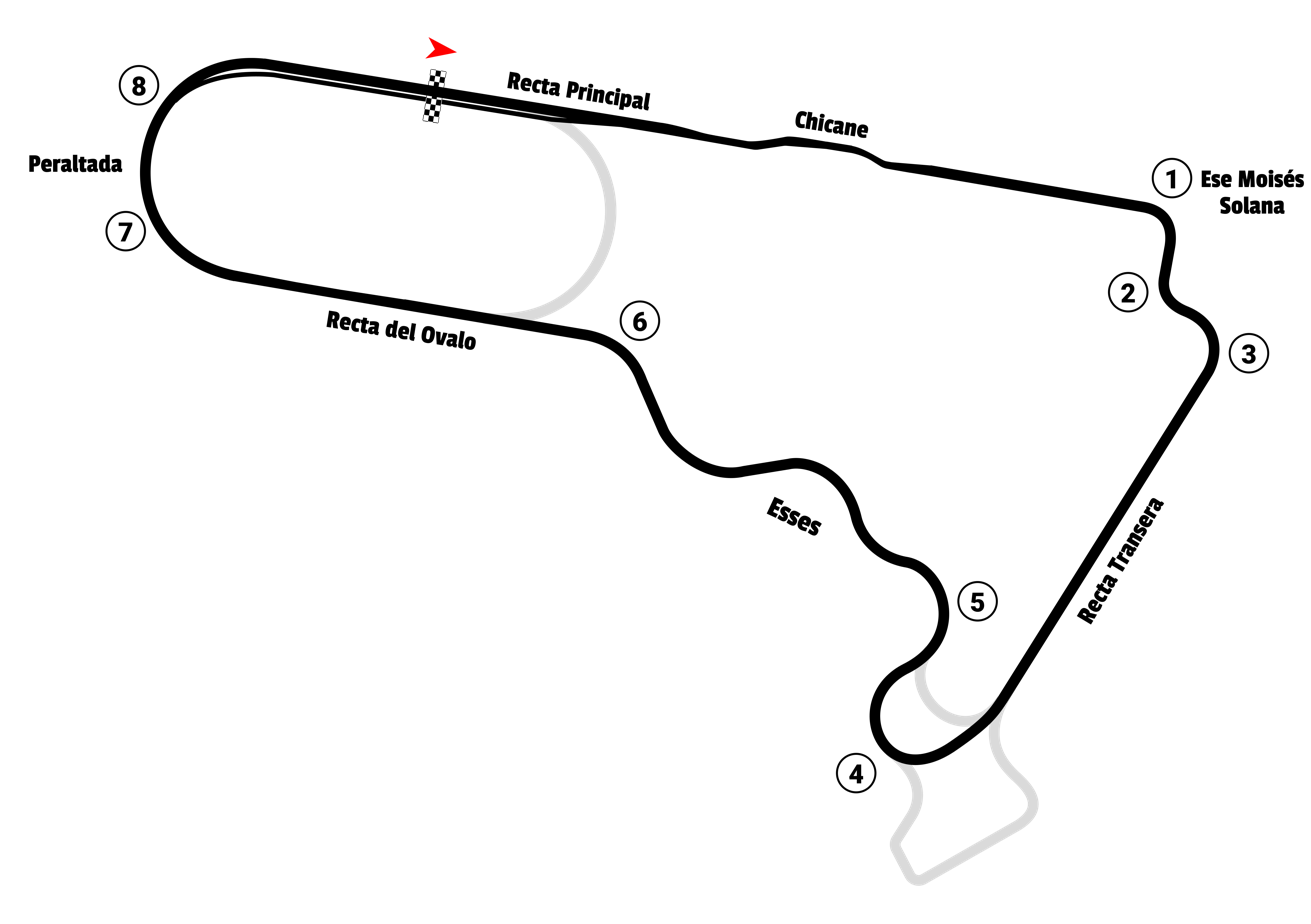
- Mexico City NASCAR layout (2005–2006)
- Date: March 6, 2005
- Official name: 2005 Telcel Motorola 200
- Location: Autódromo Hermanos Rodríguez in Mexico City, Mexico
- Course: Road Course
- Course length: 2.518 miles (4.053 km)
- Distance: 80 laps, 201.440 mi (324.186 km)
- Weather: Clear
- Average speed: 67.591 mph (108.777 km/h)
- Attendance: 94,229

Pole position
Driver	Jorge Goeters	Brewco Motorsports
- Time: 1:27.696

Most laps led
Driver	Martin Truex Jr.	Chance 2 Motorsports
- Laps: 45

Winner
No. 8	Martin Truex Jr.	Chance 2 Motorsports

Television in the United States
- Network: Fox
- Announcers: Mike Joy, Larry McReynolds, Darrell Waltrip

The 2005 Telcel Motorola 200 was a NASCAR Busch Series race held at Autódromo Hermanos Rodríguez in Mexico City, Mexico on March 6, 2005. The race was NASCAR's first ever trip to Mexico City and their first race that is not in the United States since 1999. It was also the 3rd race of the 2005 NASCAR Busch Series. The race was the NASCAR debut for former IndyCar Series driver and the hometown hero Adrián Fernández. One of Mexico's own Jorge Goeters, who was one of 10 Mexican born drivers attempting to qualify in the race, won the pole but it would be Martin Truex Jr. who would dominate the race, leading the most laps and winning the first ever race in the end.

== Background ==
The Autódromo Hermanos Rodríguez is a 4.304 km (2.674 mi) motorsport race track in Mexico City, Mexico, named after the racing drivers Ricardo (1942–1962) and Pedro Rodríguez (1940–1971). The circuit got its name shortly after it opened when Ricardo Rodríguez died in practice for the non-Championship 1962 Mexican Grand Prix. Ricardo's brother Pedro was also killed behind the wheel nine years later. Since 2015, the track has once again hosted the Formula One Mexican Grand Prix, an event it previously hosted in two separate periods on a different layout, the last occasion of which was in 1992.

The circuit is located within the public park of the Magdalena Mixhuca Sports City in southeast Mexico City. The circuit is owned by the Government of the city, but is currently operated under concession by Corporación Interamericana de Entretenimiento (CIE) through OCESA, one of CIE's subsidiaries. CIE also organizes the NASCAR and Desafío Corona races in this circuit and rents the circuits to other parties, including race organizers, automobile clubs and track amateurs for fees that are controversial due to their disproportionately high amounts compared to other ex-F1 courses.

=== Entry list ===
- (R) denotes rookie driver
- (i) denotes ineligible for points

#	Driver	Team	Make
0	Rafael Martínez	Davis Motorsports	Chevrolet
1	Boris Said	Phoenix Racing	Dodge
2	Clint Bowyer	Richard Childress Racing	Chevrolet
4	Ryan Hemphill (R)	Biagi Brothers Racing	Dodge
5	Adrián Fernández	Hendrick Motorsports	Chevrolet
6	Paul Wolfe (R)	Evernham Motorsports	Dodge
7	Chris Cook	NEMCO Motorsports	Chevrolet
8	Martin Truex Jr.	Chance 2 Motorsports	Chevrolet
10	Michel Jourdain Jr. (R)	ppc Racing	Ford
11	Paul Menard	Dale Earnhardt Inc.	Chevrolet
12	Tim Fedewa	FitzBradshaw Racing	Dodge
14	David Stremme	FitzBradshaw Racing	Dodge
16	Mark Montgomery	Day Enterprise Racing	Chevrolet
18	J. J. Yeley	Joe Gibbs Racing	Chevrolet
20	Denny Hamlin (R)	Joe Gibbs Racing	Chevrolet
21	Kevin Harvick	Richard Childress Racing	Chevrolet
22	Kenny Wallace	ppc Racing	Ford
23	Shawna Robinson	Keith Coleman Racing	Chevrolet
24	Kim Crosby (R)	GIC-Mixon Motorsports	Chevrolet
25	Ashton Lewis Jr.	Team Rensi Motorsports	Ford
27	David Green	Brewco Motorsports	Ford
28	Johnny Sauter	Phoenix Racing	Dodge
32	Shane Hmiel	Braun Racing	Chevrolet
33	Ron Hornaday Jr.	Kevin Harvick Inc.	Chevrolet
34	Randy LaJoie	Frank Cicci Racing	Chevrolet
35	Jason Keller	Team Rensi Motorsports	Ford
36	Stanton Barrett	DCT Motorsports	Chevrolet
38	Tyler Walker (R)	Akins Motorsports	Dodge
40	Carlos Contreras	FitzBradshaw Racing	Dodge
41	Reed Sorenson (R)	Chip Ganassi Racing	Dodge
42	Jamie McMurray	Chip Ganassi Racing	Dodge
43	José Luis Ramírez	Curb Agajanian Racing	Ford
44	Justin Labonte	Labonte-Haas Motorsports	Chevrolet
47	Jon Wood (R)	ST Motorsports	Ford
49	Mara Reyes	Jay Robinson Racing	Ford
52	Scott Gaylord	Means Motorsports	Ford
58	Brent Sherman (R)	Akins Motorsports	Dodge
59	Stacy Compton	ST Motorsports	Ford
60	Carl Edwards (R)	Roush Racing	Ford
64	Rusty Wallace	Rusty Wallace Inc.	Dodge
65	Stan Silva Jr.	Silva Motorsports	Chevrolet
66	Jorge Goeters	Brewco Motorsports	Ford
67	Jimmy Morales	Tom Eriksen Racing	Dodge
72	Rubén García Novoa	MacDonald Motorsports	Chevrolet
73	Eric Jones	Red Cactus Racing	Chevrolet
83	Robby Gordon (i)	Robby Gordon Motorsports	Chevrolet
87	Ron Fellows	NEMCO Motorsports	Chevrolet
90	Elliott Sadler	Robert Yates Racing	Ford
92	Alfredo Tame Jr.	Team Fuerza Motorsports	Ford
97	Todd Souza	Central Coast Racing	Chevrolet
Official Entry list

== Qualifying ==
Mexico's own Jorge Goeters won the pole for the race with a time of 1:27.696 and a speed of 103.366 mph.

=== Starting grid ===
Grid	No.	Driver	Team	Manufacturer
1	66	Jorge Goeters	Brewco Motorsports	Ford
2	83	Robby Gordon (i)**	Robby Gordon Motorsports	Chevrolet
3	8	Martin Truex Jr.	Chance 2 Motorsports	Chevrolet
4	1	Boris Said	Phoenix Racing	Dodge
5	87	Ron Fellows	NEMCO Motorsports	Chevrolet
6	21	Kevin Harvick	Richard Childress Racing	Chevrolet
7	11	Paul Menard	Dale Earnhardt Inc.	Chevrolet
8	40	Carlos Contreras	FitzBradshaw Racing	Dodge
9	60	Carl Edwards (R)	Roush Racing	Ford
10	90	Elliott Sadler	Robert Yates Racing	Ford
11	27	David Green	Brewco Motorsports	Ford
12	38	Tyler Walker (R)	Akins Motorsports	Dodge
13	2	Clint Bowyer	Richard Childress Racing	Chevrolet
14	42	Jamie McMurray	Chip Ganassi Racing	Dodge
15	35	Jason Keller	Team Rensi Motorsports	Ford
16	7	Chris Cook**	NEMCO Motorsports	Chevrolet
17	12	Tim Fedewa**	FitzBradshaw Racing	Dodge
18	10	Michel Jourdain Jr. (R)	ppc Racing	Ford
19	41	Reed Sorenson (R)	Chip Ganassi Racing	Dodge
20	25	Ashton Lewis	Team Rensi Motorsports	Ford
21	33	Ron Hornaday	Kevin Harvick Inc.	Chevrolet
22	58	Brent Sherman (R)	Akins Motorsports	Dodge
23	18	J. J. Yeley	Joe Gibbs Racing	Chevrolet
24	59	Stacy Compton	ST Motorsports	Ford
25	52	Jimmy Morales* **	Means Motorsports	Ford
26	32	Shane Hmiel	Braun Racing	Chevrolet
27	47	Jon Wood (R)	ST Motorsports	Ford
28	36	Stanton Barrett	DCT Motorsports	Chevrolet
29	28	Johnny Sauter	Phoenix Racing	Dodge
30	4	Ryan Hemphill (R)	Biagi Brothers Racing	Dodge
31	64	Rusty Wallace	Rusty Wallace Inc.	Dodge
32	34	Randy LaJoie	Frank Cicci Racing	Chevrolet
33	43	José Luis Ramírez	Curb Agajanian Racing	Ford
34	20	Denny Hamlin (R)	Joe Gibbs Racing	Chevrolet
35	22	Kenny Wallace	ppc Racing	Ford
36	14	David Stremme	FitzBradshaw Racing	Dodge
37	72	Rubén García Novoa	MacDonald Motorsports	Chevrolet
38	44	Justin Labonte	Labonte-Haas Motorsports	Chevrolet
39	49	Mara Reyes	Jay Robinson Racing	Ford
40	5	Adrián Fernández**	Hendrick Motorsports	Chevrolet
41	23	Shawna Robinson	Keith Coleman Racing	Chevrolet
42	0	Rafael Martínez	Davis Motorsports	Chevrolet
43	73	Eric Jones	Red Cactus Racing	Chevrolet
Failed to Qualify, withdrew, or driver changes
44	6	Paul Wolfe (R)	Evernham Motorsports	Dodge
45	67	Jimmy Morales	Tom Eriksen Racing	Dodge
46	97	Todd Souza	Central Coast Racing	Chevrolet
47	24	Kim Crosby (R)	GIC-Mixon Motorsports	Chevrolet
48	16	Mark Montgomery	Day Enterprise Racing	Chevrolet
49	92	Alfredo Tame Jr.	Team Fuerza Motorsports	Ford
50	65	Stan Silva Jr.	Silva Motorsports	Chevrolet
DC	52	Scott Gaylord	Means Motorsports	Ford
Official Starting grid

* – Scott Gaylord originally qualified the car and was to compete but made a last minute change to allow Jimmy Morales to be able to compete in his home Country.

** – Adrián Fernández, Chris Cook, Tim Fedewa, Jimmy Morales, and Robby Gordon all had to start at the rear of the field. Fernández had a backup car, Cook and Gordon had an engine change, Fedewa had a transmission change, and Morales has a driver change.

== Race ==
On lap 1, Martin Truex Jr. attempted to take the lead from pole sitter Jorge Goeters in turn 3 but failed to get in front of him and Goeters led the first lap becoming the first Mexican born driver to lead a Busch Series race. On lap 8, the first caution flew for debris after José Luis Ramírez's right front tire came apart. The race would restart on lap 12. On the restart, Ron Fellows attempted to take the lead from Goeters but failed to get in front of him. On lap 17, Mara Reyes spun in turn 3 and ended up getting stuck on the gravel traps in turns 1 and 2 which would bring out the second caution on lap 18. The race would restart on lap 21. On lap 25, Martin Truex Jr. took the lead after the top 2 in Jorge Goeters and Jamie McMurray both pitted. On lap 27, a couple of incidents would occur. First being when Tyler Walker overshot turn 3 and ended up going through the gravel trap but that did not bring out a caution after Walker got back onto the track without any harm. The third caution flew when Mara Reyes' car stalled in turn 1. During the caution, a wacky and funny moment would occur when a dog ran out onto the track before it found its way out going through a hole in the fence. The race would restart on lap 30. On lap 32, Stanton Barrett spun in turn 3 but no caution flew as Barrett got going again. On lap 33, Mexico City's own Adrián Fernández took the lead from Truex. At the same time, Paul Menard spun in turn 5 but no caution was thrown as he got back going again. On lap 37, Martin Truex Jr. took the lead back from Fernández. On lap 38, the 4th caution would fly when Michel Jourdain Jr. crashed in turn 8.

=== Final laps ===
The race would restart with 40 laps to go. At around 37 to go, Ron Hornaday spun in turn 3 after he got turned by Jorge Goeters but no caution flew as Hornaday got back going again. With 36 to go, Ron Fellows spun in almost the same area Hornaday did before after Fellows got turned by Carlos Contreras. No caution flew as he got back going again. With 35 to go, Kevin Harvick took the lead after Martin Truex Jr. went to pit. As soon as Truex entered pit road, the 5th caution flew with 34 to go when Rubén García Novoa crashed in the chicane at around turn 3. Stanton Barrett was the new leader and Barrett led the field to the restart with 30 laps to go. With 28 to go, both Ron Fellows and Denny Hamlin spun in turn 3. No caution was thrown as Hamlin and Fellows got back going again. At the same time, Martin Truex Jr. took the lead from Barrett. With 27 to go, the 6th caution flew for debris. The race would restart with 23 laps to go. With 22 to go, Reed Sorenson spun in turn 4 but no caution threw as he got going again before the 7th caution flew for fluid from Robby Gordon's blown engine. The race would restart with 17 to go. With 16 to go, Tim Fedewa spun in turn 4 but no caution flew as he got back going again. With 15 to go, the 8th and final caution flew when Jorge Goeters' engine blew. The race would restart with 11 laps to go. Multiple incidents occurred during the run with no cautions thrown as the drivers got going. With 10 to go, Shawna Robinson spun in turn 3. With 9 to go, Stanton Barrett spun in turn 5. With 7 to go, Tyler Walker and Jamie McMurray spun in turn 5. With 3 to go, José Luis Ramírez spun in turn 4. While all that was going on, Martin Truex Jr. held onto the lead and Truex would win the first race at Mexico with Truex scoring his first of 6 wins en route to his 2nd Busch Series championship in a row. Kevin Harvick, Carl Edwards, Shane Hmiel, and Boris Said rounded out the top 5 while Rusty Wallace, Clint Bowyer, Kenny Wallace, Ashton Lewis, and Adrián Fernández rounded out the top 10.

== Race results ==
Pos	Car	Driver	Team	Manufacturer	Laps Run	Laps Led	Status	Points
1	8	Martin Truex Jr.	Chance 2 Motorsports	Chevrolet	80	45	running	190
2	21	Kevin Harvick	Richard Childress Racing	Chevrolet	80	2	running	175
3	60	Carl Edwards (R)	Roush Racing	Ford	80	0	running	165
4	32	Shane Hmiel	Braun Racing	Chevrolet	80	0	running	160
5	1	Boris Said	Phoenix Racing	Dodge	80	0	running	155
6	64	Rusty Wallace	Rusty Wallace Inc.	Dodge	80	0	running	150
7	2	Clint Bowyer	Richard Childress Racing	Chevrolet	80	0	running	146
8	22	Kenny Wallace	ppc Racing	Ford	80	0	running	142
9	25	Ashton Lewis	Team Rensi Motorsports	Ford	80	1	running	143
10	5	Adrián Fernández	Hendrick Motorsports	Chevrolet	80	4	running	139
11	28	Johnny Sauter	Phoenix Racing	Dodge	80	0	running	130
12	33	Ron Hornaday	Kevin Harvick Inc.	Chevrolet	80	0	running	127
13	35	Jason Keller	Team Rensi Motorsports	Ford	80	0	running	124
14	41	Reed Sorenson (R)	Chip Ganassi Racing	Dodge	80	0	running	121
15	20	Denny Hamlin (R)	Joe Gibbs Racing	Chevrolet	80	0	running	118
16	47	Jon Wood (R)	ST Motorsports	Ford	80	0	running	115
17	4	Ryan Hemphill (R)	Biagi Brothers Racing	Dodge	80	0	running	112
18	90	Elliott Sadler	Robert Yates Racing	Ford	80	0	running	109
19	36	Stanton Barrett	SCT Motorsports	Chevrolet	80	4	running	111
20	52	Jimmy Morales	Means Motorsports	Ford	80	0	running	103
21	12	Tim Fedewa	FitzBradshaw Racing	Dodge	80	0	running	100
22	14	David Stremme	FitzBradshaw Racing	Dodge	80	0	running	97
23	58	Brent Sherman (R)	Akins Motorsports	Dodge	80	0	running	94
24	38	Tyler Walker (R)	Akins Motorsports	Dodge	80	0	running	91
25	44	Justin Labonte	Labonte-Haas Motorsports	Chevrolet	80	0	running	88
26	7	Chris Cook	NEMCO Motorsports	Chevrolet	80	0	running	85
27	72	Rubén García Novoa	MacDonald Motorsports	Chevrolet	80	0	running	82
28	59	Stacy Compton	ST Motorsports	Ford	80	0	running	79
29	73	Eric Jones	Red Cactus Racing	Chevrolet	80	0	running	76
30	23	Shawna Robinson	Keith Coleman Racing	Chevrolet	80	0	running	73
31	43	José Luis Ramírez	Curb Agajanian Racing	Ford	80	0	running	70
32	34	Randy LaJoie	Frank Cicci Racing	Chevrolet	80	0	running	67
33	42	Jamie McMurray	Chip Ganassi Racing	Dodge	80	0	running	64
34	11	Paul Menard	Dale Earnhardt Inc.	Chevrolet	77	0	running	61
35	49	Mara Reyes	Jay Robinson Racing	Ford	75	0	running	58
36	40	Carlos Contreras	FitzBradshaw Racing	Dodge	73	0	handling	55
37	10	Michel Jourdain Jr. (R)	ppc Racing	Ford	69	0	running	52
38	66	Jorge Goeters	Brewco Motorsports	Ford	65	24	engine	54
39	27	David Green	Brewco Motorsports	Ford	63	0	running	46
40	83	Robby Gordon (i)	Robby Gordon Motorsports	Chevrolet	56	0	engine	0
41	87	Ron Fellows	NEMCO Motorsports	Chevrolet	54	0	crash	40
42	18	J. J. Yeley	Joe Gibbs Racing	Chevrolet	20	0	engine	37
43	0	Rafael Martínez	Davis Motorsports	Chevrolet	0	0	engine	34
Official Race results

Previous race: 2005 Stater Brothers 300	NASCAR Busch Series; 2005 season	Next race: 2005 Sam's Town 300
