= List of NASCAR race wins by Greg Biffle =

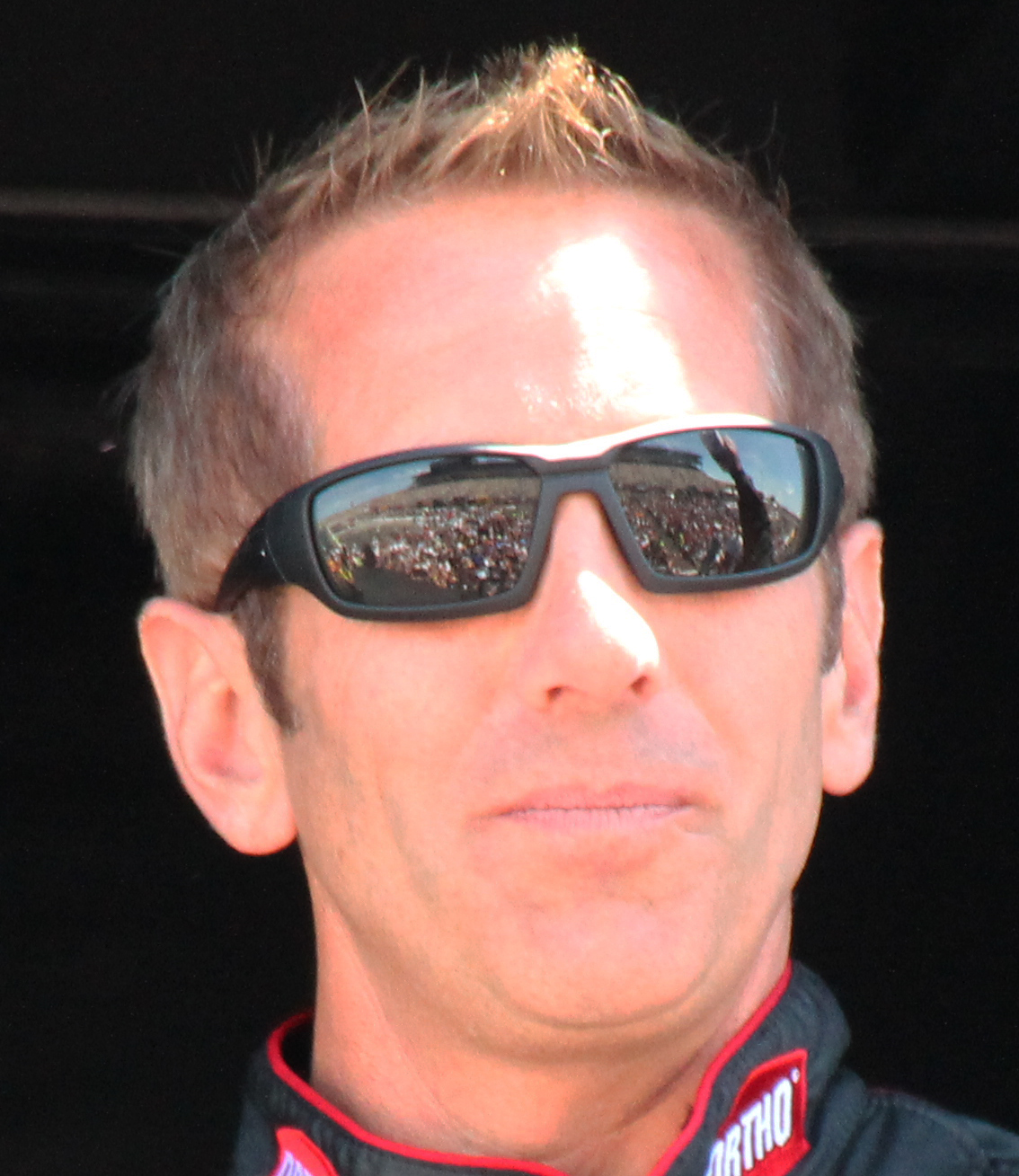
Greg Biffle won 56 NASCAR races and two series championships.

Greg Biffle was an American professional race car driver who most notably competed in the NASCAR Cup Series from 2002 to 2022, mainly driving the No.16 Ford for Jack Roush's Roush Fenway Racing team from 2002 to 2016. Biffle made his NASCAR debut in the Craftsman Truck Series in 1998. He had left a lasting impression on former Cup Series champion Benny Parsons, who witnessed Biffle compete in and win the ESPN-televised Winter Heat Series in 1996. On Parsons' recommendation, Roush gave the 28-year old Washington native an opportunity in the No.60 truck in 1998. Biffle went on to secure Truck Series Rookie of the Year honours in 1998, set a then-record 9 wins in a season in 1999, and win Jack Roush's first NASCAR title in 2000 on the back of an additional 5 wins on the season. In total, Biffle scored 17 Truck Series wins in his career.

For 2001, Jack Roush decided to promote Biffle to the Busch Series, with an eye on the Cup Series in 2003. Biffle described the promotion to NASCAR's second tier as "more of a lateral move than moving up", but rewarded Roush with 5 wins, a Rookie of the Year title, and a 4th place points finish in 2001. He then followed up this immediate success with a championship campaign, winning 4 races and securing the 2002 Busch Series title. Biffle would amass 20 wins in the Busch Series, all coming between 2001 and 2009.

After winning another NASCAR championship for Jack Roush, Biffle was promoted to the sport's premier series in 2003. He would drive using only the No.16 for the entirety of his full-time Cup career, a distinction only matched by Jeff Gordon (with No.24), Jimmie Johnson (with No.48), and Juan Pablo Montoya (with No.42) amongst drivers of his era. Biffle immediately delivered his first Cup Series win in his rookie campaign. In the 17th race of the 2003 season, and in just his 24th Cup Series start, Greg Biffle would win the 2003 Pepsi 400 at Daytona International Speedway, leading the contest's final 21 laps. He would follow this up with 2 wins in 2004, coming at Michigan and Homestead-Miami.

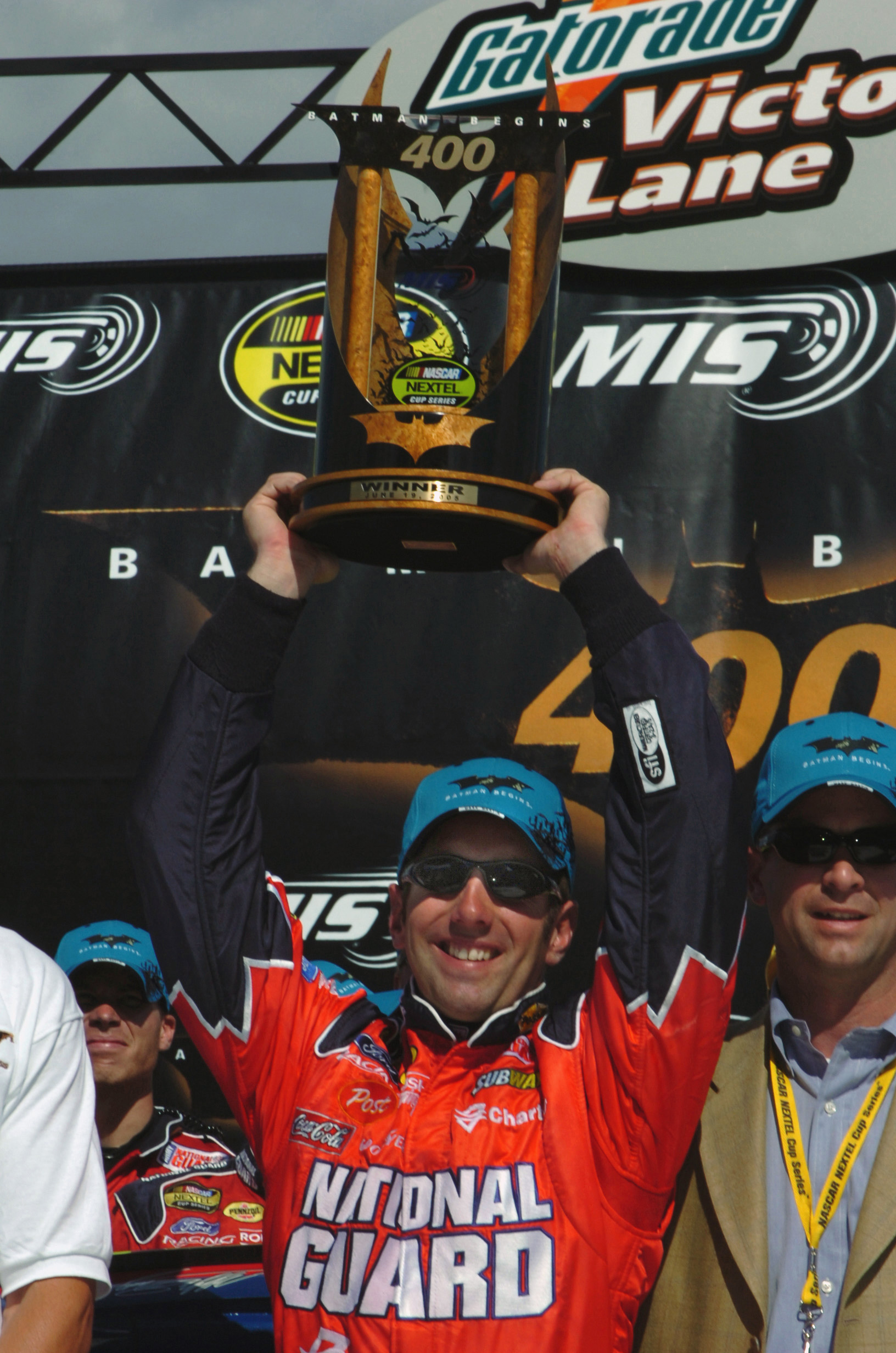
Biffle celebrating victory in the 2005 Batman Begins 400, his 5th of 6 wins on the season

The following year would prove to be Greg Biffle's most prolific year in the Cup Series, as 2005 saw his 16 team in victory lane 6 times, more than any other competitor. Biffle earned victories at California, Texas, Darlington, Dover, Michigan, and Homestead-Miami, but a loose wheel during the 2005 Dickies 500 at Texas in November would ultimately cost him the 2005 title. He would finish a mere 35 points behind legendary driver Tony Stewart in the final standings. As of 2025, Biffle remains the driver who came closest to winning a championship across all 3 of NASCAR's top series.

After narrowly missing out on claiming NASCAR's ultimate prize, Biffle would endure difficult seasons in both 2006 and 2007, missing out on Chase for the Cup qualification. He would however earn victories at Darlington and Homestead-Miami in 2006, and at Kansas in 2007. These wins proved to be noteworthy: with back-to-back Southern 500 victories in 2005 and 2006, Greg Biffle became only the 7th driver in NASCAR history to accomplish the feat, joining Herb Thomas, Bobby Allison, Cale Yarborough, David Pearson, Dale Earnhardt, and Jeff Gordon. And by winning the 2006 Ford 400, Biffle secured 3 consecutive victories at Homestead-Miami Speedway, an achievement that has not been matched as of 2025. He is tied with Tony Stewart for most Cup Series wins (3) at Homestead-Miami Speedway.

Biffle's 2008 campaign would yield wins in the opening two rounds of the Chase for the Cup at Loudon and Dover, becoming the first driver to accomplish this feat. His championship push however was short-lived, and he would eventually place 3rd in the season's final standings. 2009 saw a 7th place points finish but no wins for Biffle, marking the first time in his Cup career that he had failed to achieve victory in a season. The 16 team would return to winning form in 2010, earning victories at Pocono and Kansas and placing 6th overall for the season.

Biffle would endure a winless 2011 season before making the final championship push of his career in 2012. That year, he would earn victories at Texas and Michigan, and lead the championship standings longer than any other driver, but would ultimately be undone by Chase re-seeding and fade to 5th in the final rank. In 2013, Biffle would win the Quicken Loans 400 at Michigan, taking the 19th and final victory of his Cup Series career. Biffle would remain with Roush Fenway Racing until the end of 2016, quietly bowing out of full-time competition thereafter. He would however make a surprise cameo return with Kyle Busch Motorsports in 2019, piloting the No.51 truck to victory at Texas. This win proved to be the 56th and final victory in NASCAR competition for Biffle.

In all, Biffle won a total of 56 NASCAR races, 19 of which were in the Cup Series. Biffle also won 20 races in the Busch Series and 17 in the Craftsman Truck Series. All but 4 of his victories came driving for Jack Roush, with 53 of 56 representing Ford. Of the remaining non-Roush wins, 2 came for Evans Motorsports (Chevrolet), 1 for Brewco Motorsports (Ford) and 1 for Kyle Busch Motorsports (Toyota). His most successful circuit was Michigan International Speedway, where he won 6 times (4 in Cup, 2 in Trucks). Biffle's largest margin of victory in the Cup Series was at the 2004 GFS Marketplace 400 at Michigan International Speedway, a race where he finished 8.216 seconds ahead of teammate Mark Martin, while his smallest margin of victory was at the 2005 Ford 400 at Homestead-Miami Speedway, where he once again beat the aforementioned Martin by 0.017 seconds. He was named one of NASCAR's 75 Greatest Drivers in 2023, and is a nominee for the NASCAR Hall of Fame in Charlotte.

== Cup Series ==
In the NASCAR Cup Series, which was sponsored by Winston, Nextel, and Sprint during his career, Biffle, the 2000 Truck Series Champion and 2002 Busch Series Champion, won 19 races. Throughout his career, he won at 10 unique circuits, doing so at Michigan 4 times, at Homestead-Miami 3 times, at Darlington, Texas, Dover, and Kansas twice each, and at Daytona, California, Loudon, and Pocono once each. As of the end of the 2025 NASCAR Cup Series, Biffle's 19 wins rank 45th all-time, tied with Fonty Flock and Hall of Fame members Davey Allison and Buddy Baker.

=== Notable Achievements ===
==== Michigan International Speedway ====
Biffle's victory in the 2013 Quicken Loans 400 gave Ford Motor Company a historic 1,000th win in NASCAR competition, and proved to be his final win in Cup competition. His most prolific track, Biffle was consistently among the favourites to win at Michigan throughout his Cup career, winning in 2004, 2005, 2012, and 2013.

==== Darlington Raceway ====
Biffle won back-to-back Southern 500s, one of NASCAR's four crown jewel events, in 2005 and 2006, a feat only eight drivers have accomplished in the sport's history as of 2025. From 2005 to 2015, Biffle ranked 1st in laps led (637), 1st in fastest laps run (309), 1st in average starting position (11.1), 4th in average finishing position (13.6), and 5th in driver rating (102.9) at Darlington, according to NASCAR's Loop Data Statistics.

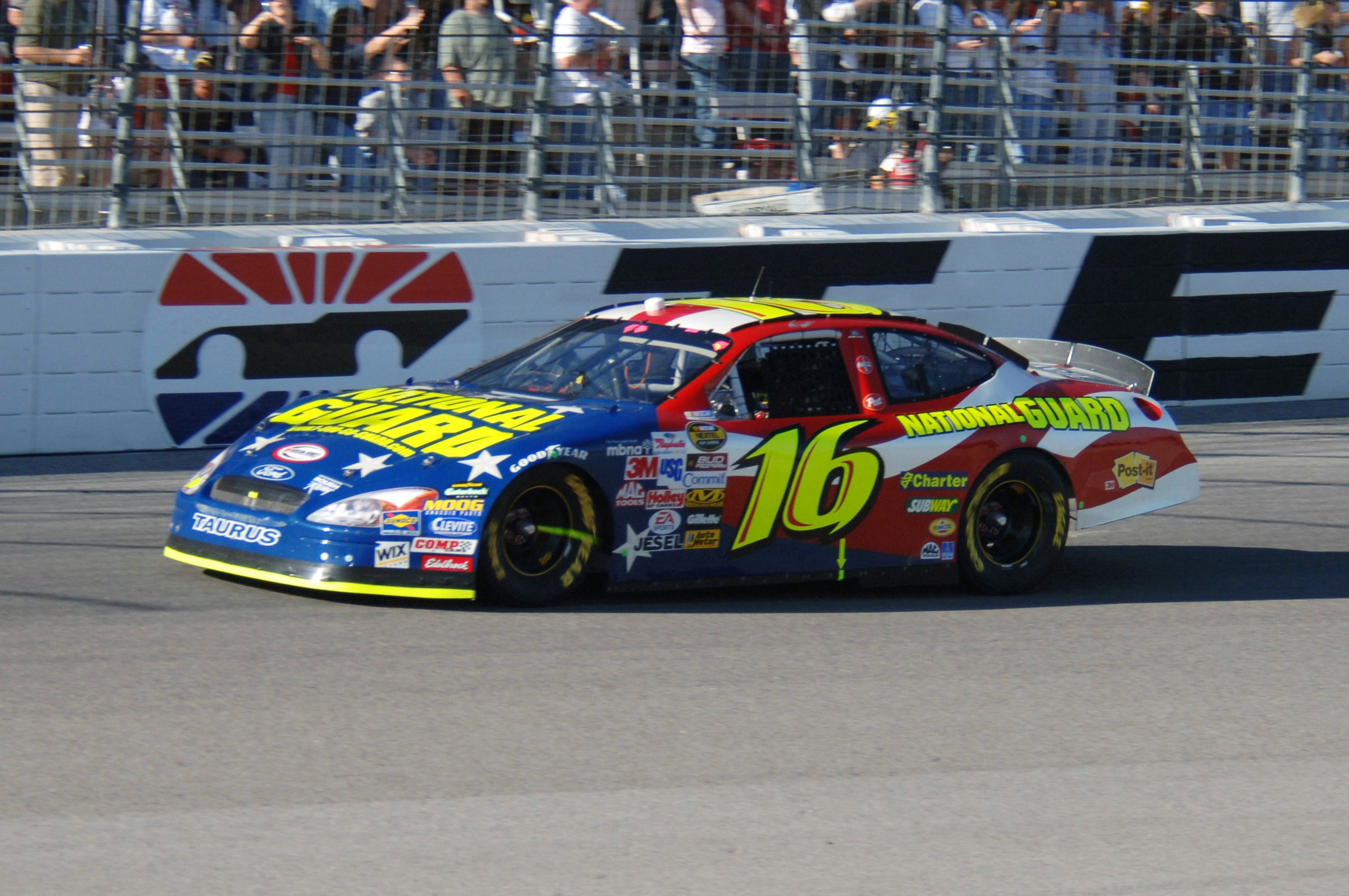
Biffle in action at Texas in 2005

==== Texas Motor Speedway ====
As of 2025, Biffle ranks 5th all-time at Texas Motor Speedway in race laps led with 733, despite having fewer starts (26) than all drivers above him. His 2012 Samsung Mobile 500 victory continues to hold the distinction of being the track's all-time fastest race, with an average speed of 160.577 mph courtesy of a 234-lap green flag run. Biffle also led 219 laps during his 2005 Samsung/Radio Shack 500 victory, the 4th highest tally from a Texas race winner behind only Tony Stewart in 2006 (278), Kyle Larson in 2021 (256), and Jimmie Johnson in 2013 (255).

==== Homestead-Miami Speedway ====
Biffle won a record three consecutive races at Homestead-Miami Speedway from 2004 to 2006. He is tied with Tony Stewart for most wins at the track (3). Biffle's .017 second margin of victory over Mark Martin in the 2005 Ford 400 remains the closest finish in the track's history, as of 2025.

Key:

- No. – Victory number; for example, "1" signifies Biffle's first race win.
- Race – Race number in Biffle's NASCAR Cup/Nationwide/Truck Series career; for example "92" signifies Biffle's 92nd race in a NASCAR division.
- Grid – The position on the grid from which Biffle started the race.
- Margin – Margin of victory, given in the format of seconds.milliseconds; caution indicates the race was ended by a yellow flag for an accident or inclement weather
- † – Driver's Championship winning season.

NASCAR Cup Series victories
No.	Race	Date	Season	Race	Track	Grid	Margin	Team	Car	Ref
1	24	July 5, 2003	2003	Pepsi 400	Daytona International Speedway	30	4.102	Roush Racing	Ford	
2	65	August 22, 2004	2004	GFS Marketplace 400	Michigan International Speedway	24	8.216	Roush Racing	Ford	
3	78	November 21, 2004	2004	Ford 400	Homestead-Miami Speedway	2	0.342	Roush Racing	Ford	
4	80	February 27, 2005	2005	Auto Club 500	California Speedway	5	0.231	Roush Racing	Ford	
5	85	April 17, 2005	2005	Samsung/Radio Shack 500	Texas Motor Speedway	5	3.244	Roush Racing	Ford	
6	88	May 7, 2005	2005	Southern 500	Darlington Raceway	3	0.990	Roush Racing	Ford	
7	91	June 5, 2005	2005	MBNA RacePoints 400	Dover Downs International Speedway	2	4.281	Roush Racing	Ford	
8	93	June 19, 2005	2005	Batman Begins 400	Michigan International Speedway	25	1.675	Roush Racing	Ford	
9	114	November 20, 2005	2005	Ford 400	Homestead-Miami Speedway	7	0.017	Roush Racing	Ford	
10	125	May 13, 2006	2006	Southern 500	Darlington Raceway	9	0.209	Roush Racing	Ford	
11	150	November 19, 2006	2006	Ford 400	Homestead-Miami Speedway	22	0.389	Roush Racing	Ford	
12	179	September 30, 2007	2007	LifeLock 400	Kansas Speedway	7	Caution	Roush Racing	Ford	
13	213	September 14, 2008	2008	Sylvania 300	New Hampshire Motor Speedway	9	0.505	Roush Racing	Ford	
14	214	September 21, 2008	2008	Camping World RV 400	Dover International Speedway	5	0.934	Roush Racing	Ford	
15	279	August 1, 2010	2010	Pennsylvania 500	Pocono Raceway	12	3.598	Roush Racing	Ford	
16	287	October 3, 2010	2010	Price Chopper 400	Kansas Speedway	5	7.638	Roush Racing	Ford	
17	301	April 14, 2012	2012	Samsung Mobile 500	Texas Motor Speedway	3	3.235	Roush Racing	Ford	
18	317	August 19, 2012	2012	Pure Michigan 400	Michigan International Speedway	13	0.416	Roush Racing	Ford	
19	345	June 16, 2013	2013	Quicken Loans 400	Michigan International Speedway	19	2.989	Roush Racing	Ford	

== Busch/Nationwide Series ==
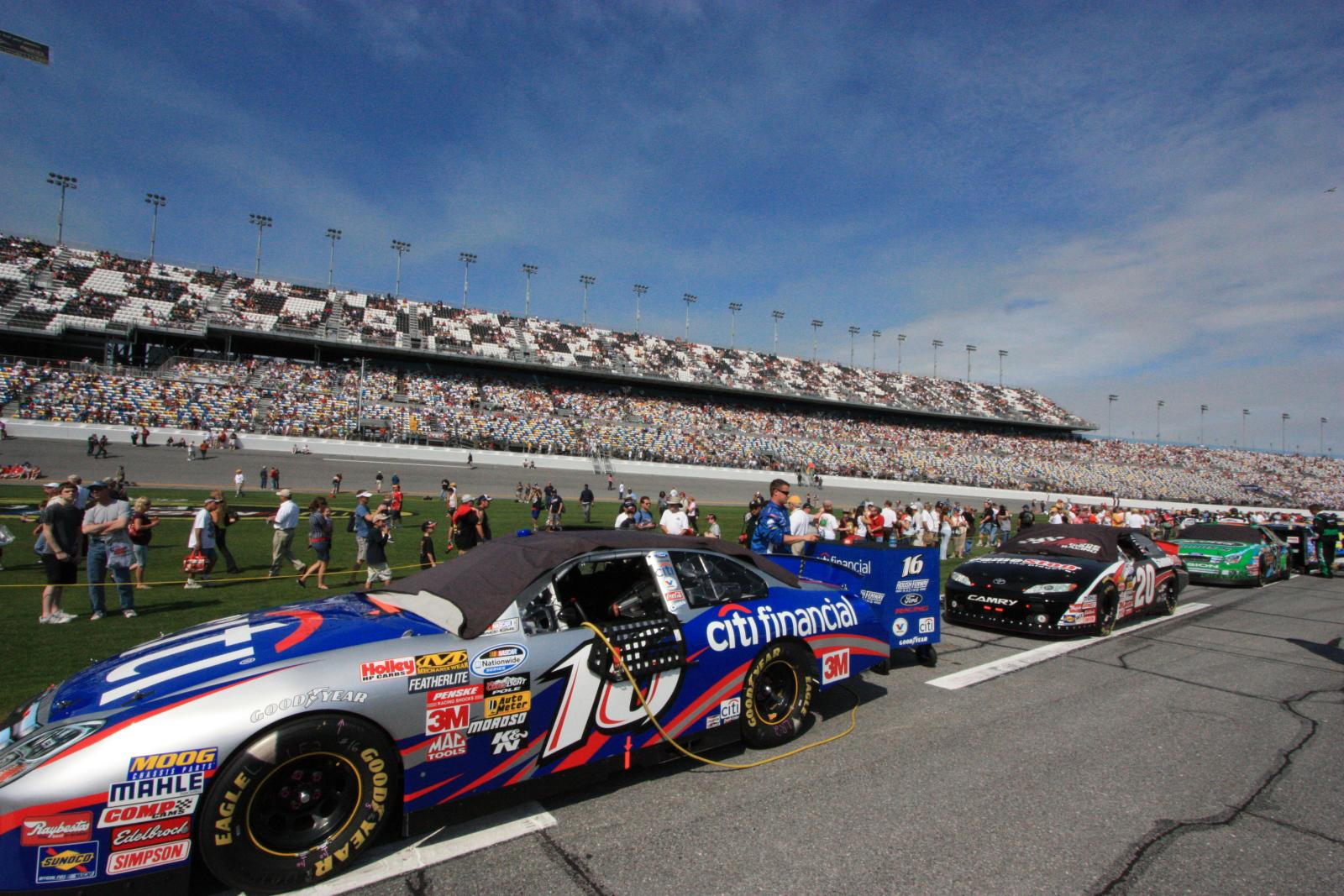
17 of Biffle's 20 NASCAR Busch/Nationwide Series wins came while driving for Jack Roush

In NASCAR's second-level series, known as the Busch Series and then Nationwide Series during his racing career, Biffle won 20 races. Winning 5 races as a rookie and 4 in his 2002 championship season, Biffle amassed a series-leading 16 wins in the Busch Series from 2000 to 2004. Biffle won at 13 unique tracks in the Busch Series, including 3 wins at both Fontana and Phoenix. He secured back-to-back wins at The Milwaukee Mile (2001,2002), and swept the Fontana races in 2004.

NASCAR Nationwide Series victories
No.	Race	Date	Season	Race	Track	Grid	Margin	Team	Car	Ref
1	10	April 14, 2001	2001	Pepsi 300	Nashville Superspeedway	4	0.602	Roush Racing	Ford	
2	15	May 20, 2001	2001	Nazareth 200	Nazareth Speedway	7	8.574	Roush Racing	Ford	
3	19	July 1, 2001	2001	GNC Live Well 250	The Milwaukee Mile	2	13.302	Roush Racing	Ford	
4	31	October 6, 2001	2001	Little Trees 300	Lowe's Motor Speedway	3	Caution	Roush Racing	Ford	
5	33	October 27, 2001	2001	Outback Steakhouse 200	Phoenix International Raceway	4	Caution	Roush Racing	Ford	
6	49	June 1, 2002	2002†	MBNA Platinum 200	Dover International Speedway	3	0.657	Roush Racing	Ford	
7	52	June 30, 2002	2002†	GNC Live Well 250	The Milwaukee Mile	1	0.438	Roush Racing	Ford	
8	55	July 20, 2002	2002†	Charter Pipeline 250	Gateway International Speedway	7	1.945	Roush Racing	Ford	
9	57	August 3, 2002	2002†	Kroger 200 Presented by Tom Raper RVS	Indianapolis Raceway Park	1	0.147	Roush Racing	Ford	
10	66	October 11, 2003	2003	Little Trees 300	Lowe's Motor Speedway	4	12.628	Ed Evans	Chevrolet	
11	68	October 25, 2003	2003	Aaron's 312	Atlanta Motor Speedway	1	0.961	Ed Evans	Chevrolet	
12	75	March 20, 2004	2004	Diamond Hill Plywood 200	Darlington Raceway	4	3.115	Roush Racing	Ford	
13	80	May 1, 2004	2004	Stater Brothers 300 Presented by Gatorade	California Speedway	15	5.323	Roush Racing	Ford	
14	85	June 7, 2004	2004	MBNA America 200	Dover International Speedway	7	1.772	Roush Racing	Ford	
15	92	July 31, 2004	2004	Goulds Pumps/ITT Industries Salute To The Troops 250	Pikes Peak International Raceway	25	1.651	Roush Racing	Ford	
16	96	September 4, 2004	2004	Target House 300	California Speedway	14	0.356	Roush Racing	Ford	
17	103	April 22, 2005	2005	Bashas' Supermarkets 200	Phoenix International Speedway	20	1.969	Brewco Motorsports	Ford	
18	125	February 25, 2006	2006	Stater Brothers 300	California Speedway	3	2.255	Roush Racing	Ford	
19	202	February 28, 2009	2009	Sam's Town 300	Las Vegas Motor Speedway	3	0.391	Roush Racing	Ford	
20	203	April 17, 2009	2009	Bashas' Supermarkets 200	Phoenix International Speedway	4	0.338	Roush Racing	Ford	

== Craftsman Truck Series ==
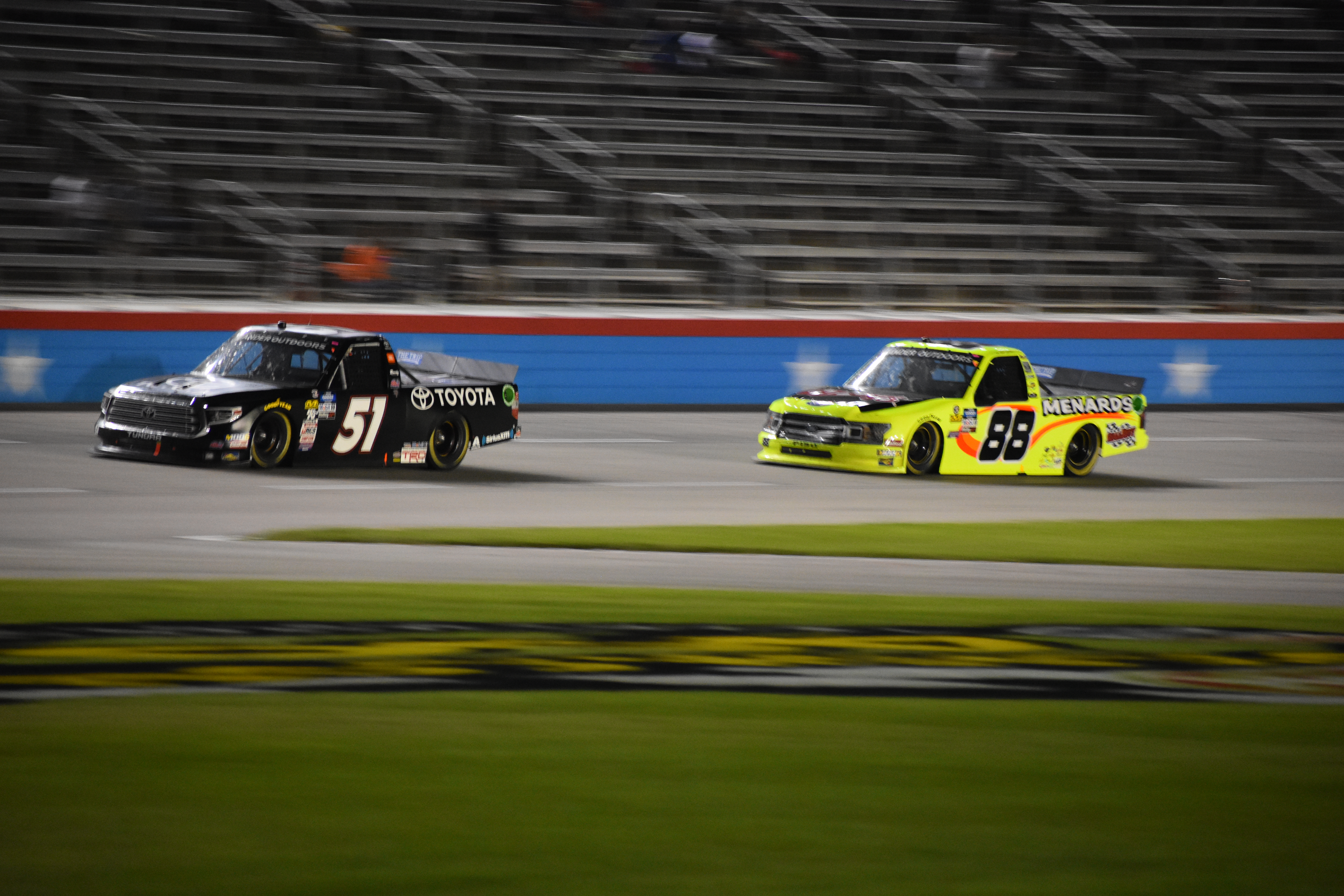
Biffle on the prowl at Texas during his 2019 return

In NASCAR's third-level series, known as the Craftsman Truck Series and the Gander RV & Outdoors Truck Series during his career, Biffle won 17 races. 9 of these wins came during his title-challenging sophomore season in 1999. This tally stood as the benchmark for wins in a season for 26 years, with Corey Heim matching and eventually besting it with 12 wins in 2025. Biffle followed up his 9-win campaign with a title winning season in 2000, leading the series in wins (5), top-fives (18) top-tens (18), and money earned ($1,002,510) He made 4 cameo appearances in the 2001 season, securing an additional 2 wins. Biffle's final victory in NASCAR came in the Truck Series, winning the SpeedyCash.com 400 for owner Kyle "KFB" Busch. It was Biffle's first win in the series since 2001, a record-setting 17 years, 7 months, 23 days between wins in a NASCAR sanctioned series.

NASCAR Craftsman Truck Series victories
No.	Race	Date	Season	Race	Track	Grid	Margin	Team	Car	Ref
1	33	May 8, 1999	1999	Memphis 200	Memphis Motorsports Park	1	0.241	Roush Racing	Ford	
2	38	June 18, 1999	1999	Grainger Industrial Supply 225K	Portland International Raceway	7	2.88	Roush Racing	Ford	
3	40	July 3, 1999	1999	DieHard 200	The Milwaukee Mile	1	1.88	Roush Racing	Ford	
4	42	July 18, 1999	1999	NAPA Autocare 200	Nazareth Speedway	1	0.751	Roush Racing	Ford	
5	43	July 24, 1999	1999	GoRacing.com 200	Michigan International Speedway	11	0.153	Roush Racing	Ford	
6	45	August 5, 1999	1999	Power Stroke 200 by Ford	Indianapolis Raceway Park	3	0.261	Roush Racing	Ford	
7	46	August 20, 1999	1999	RAM Tough 200	Gateway International Raceway	5	2.034	Roush Racing	Ford	
8	48	September 9, 1999	1999	Virginia Is For Lovers 200	Richmond International Raceway	4	Caution	Roush Racing	Ford	
9	49	September 24, 1999	1999	The Orleans 250	Las Vegas Motor Speedway	5	0.299	Roush Racing	Ford	
10	61	May 21, 2000	2000†	Grainger.com 200	Pikes Peak International Raceway	3	4.281	Roush Racing	Ford	
11	63	June 9, 2000	2000†	Pronto Auto Parts 400K	Texas Motor Speedway	1	2.741	Roush Racing	Ford	
12	64	June 17, 2000	2000†	Kroger 225	Kentucky Speedway	2	2.182	Roush Racing	Ford	
13	65	June 24, 2000	2000†	Bully Hill Vineyards 150	Watkins Glen International	1	1.498	Roush Racing	Ford	
14	69	July 22, 2000	2000†	Michigan 200	Michigan International Speedway	2	1.324	Roush Racing	Ford	
15	79	August 26, 2001	2001	Chevy Silverado 200	Nazareth Speedway	2	0.514	Roush Racing	Ford	
16	80	October 26, 2001	2001	Chevy Silverado 150	Phoenix International Raceway	11	0.542	Roush Racing	Ford	
17	82	June 7, 2019	2019	SpeedyCash.com 400	Texas Motor Speedway	6	0.963	Kyle Busch Motorsports	Toyota	

== Victories at different tracks ==
The ‡ symbol indicates Biffle won at a track twice in a calendar year. Bold denotes Cup win.

No.	Track	Years won	Wins
1	Michigan International Speedway	1999, 2000, **2004**, **2005**, **2012**, **2013**	6
2	Dover Motor Speedway	2002, 2004, **2005**, **2008**	4
3	Texas Motor Speedway	2000, **2005**, **2012**, 2019	4
4	Auto Club Speedway	2004‡, **2005**, 2006	4
5	Phoenix International Raceway	2001‡, 2005, 2009	4
6	Homestead-Miami Speedway	**2004**, **2005**, **2006**	3
7	Darlington Raceway	2004, **2005**, **2006**	3
8	The Milwaukee Mile	1999, 2001, 2002	3
9	Nazareth Speedway	1999, 2001‡	3
10	Kansas Speedway	**2007**, **2010**	2
11	Charlotte Motor Speedway	2001, 2003	2
12	Gateway Motorsports Park	1999, 2002	2
13	Lucas Oil Indianapolis Raceway Park	1999, 2002	2
14	Pikes Peak International Raceway	2000, 2004	2
15	Las Vegas Motor Speedway	1999, 2009	2
16	Daytona International Speedway	**2003**	1
17	New Hampshire Motor Speedway	**2008**	1
18	Pocono Raceway	**2010**	1
19	Nashville Superspeedway	2001	1
20	Atlanta Motor Speedway	2003	1
21	Memphis Motorsports Park	1999	1
22	Portland International Raceway	1999	1
23	Richmond International Raceway	1999	1
24	Kentucky Speedway	2000	1
25	Watkins Glen International	2000	1
Total number of race wins:			56

== Honours ==
=== Crown Jewel Victories ===
- 2x Southern 500 winner: 2005, 2006
- 1 of only 8 drivers in NASCAR history to win back-to-back Southern 500 crown jewel races

=== Track Records ===
Biffle is the all-time winningest Cup Series driver at the following track:

- Homestead-Miami Speedway (3, tied with Tony Stewart)

Biffle is the all-time winningest Truck Series driver at the following tracks:

- Michigan International Speedway (2, tied with Travis Kvapil and Brett Moffitt)
- Nazareth Speedway (2, tied with Jack Sprague)

=== Miscellaneous ===
- 6 NASCAR wins at Michigan (6th all-time)
- Most wins at Michigan for RFK Racing - 4 (tied with Mark Martin)
- Most wins at Homestead-Miami Speedway for RFK Racing - 3
- NASCAR Cup Series at Texas Motor Speedway Race Record: 160.577 mph
- 733 race laps led at Texas Motor Speedway (5th most all-time)
- 3 NASCAR Busch Series wins at Auto Club Speedway (3rd all-time)
- 9 wins in a NASCAR Craftsman Truck Series season (2nd most all-time)
- Longest time between NASCAR Craftsman Truck Series wins - 17 years, 7 months, 23 days
- 45th all-time in NASCAR Cup Series wins
- 17th all-time in Busch Series wins
- 9th all-time in NASCAR Craftsman Truck Series wins
- Winningest Washington-born NASCAR driver (56 total wins)

== See also ==
- Greg Biffle
- List of all-time NASCAR Cup Series winners
- 2000 NASCAR Craftsman Truck Series
- 2002 NASCAR Busch Series
