= List of NASCAR race wins by Dale Earnhardt =

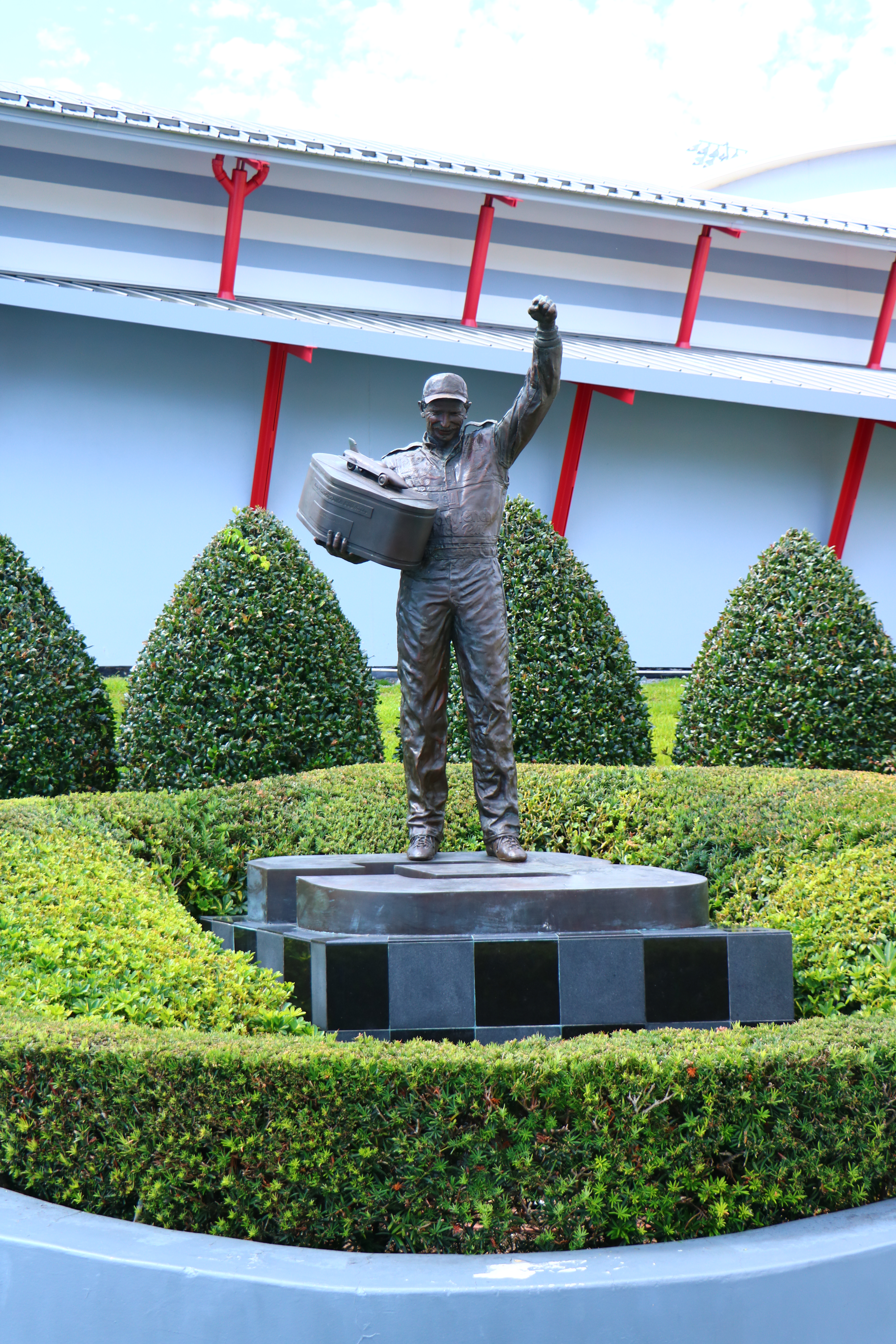
Earnhardt’s Statue at Daytona

Dale Earnhardt was an American professional stock car driver and team owner, who raced from 1975 to 2001 in the NASCAR Winston Cup Series, most notably driving the No. 3 Chevrolet for Richard Childress Racing. He began his career in the 1975 World 600 and won a total of 76 Winston Cup races over the course of his 26-year career, including ten times at Talladega Superspeedway and the 1998 Daytona 500. He is the only driver in the modern era of NASCAR (1972–present) to score at least one win in each of four different decades (having collected his first career win in 1979, 38 wins in the 1980s, 35 wins in the 1990s, and his final two career wins in 2000). He won seven Winston Cup championships from 1980 to 1994, a record held with Richard Petty and Jimmie Johnson.

== NASCAR ==
=== Winston Cup Series ===
Earnhardt won 76 races in the Winston Cup Series from 1979 to 2000. Of those, 67 wins came with Richard Childress Racing in the No. 3, with sponsorship from Wrangler Jeans and GM Goodwrench. Earnhardt won his first six races in 1979 and 1980 driving for Rod Osterlund, winning Rookie of the Year honors in 1979 and his first of seven championships in 1980. He drove for Bud Moore Engineering from 1982 to 1983, picking up three victories, before moving to Childress in 1984, where he won six more championships (1986, 1987, 1990, 1991, 1993, 1994).

NASCAR Cup Series victories
No.	Date	Season	Race	Track	Location
1	April 1	1979	Southeastern 500	Bristol International Raceway	Bristol, Tennessee
2	March 16	1980	Atlanta 500	Atlanta International Raceway	Hampton, Georgia
3	March 30	1980	Valleydale Southeastern 500	Bristol International Raceway	Bristol, Tennessee
4	July 12	1980	Busch Nashville 420	Nashville Fairgrounds Speedway	Nashville, Tennessee
5	September 28	1980	Old Dominion 500	Martinsville Speedway	Ridgeway, Virginia
6	October 5	1980	National 500	Charlotte Motor Speedway	Concord, North Carolina
7	April 4	1982	CRC Chemicals Rebel 500	Darlington Raceway	Darlington, South Carolina
8	July 16	1983	Busch Nashville 420	Nashville Fairgrounds Speedway	Nashville, Tennessee
9	July 31	1983	Talladega 500	Alabama International Motor Speedway	Lincoln, Alabama
10	July 29	1984	Talladega 500	Alabama International Motor Speedway	Lincoln, Alabama
11	November 11	1984	Atlanta Journal 500	Atlanta International Raceway	Hampton, Georgia
12	February 24	1985	Miller High Life 400	Richmond Fairgrounds Raceway	Richmond, Virginia
13	April 6	1985	Valleydale 500	Bristol International Raceway	Bristol, Tennessee
14	August 24	1985	Busch 500	Bristol International Raceway	Bristol, Tennessee
15	September 22	1985	Goody's 500	Martinsville Speedway	Ridgeway, Virginia
16	April 13	1986	TranSouth 500	Darlington Raceway	Darlington, South Carolina
17	April 20	1986	First Union 400	North Wilkesboro Speedway	North Wilkesboro, North Carolina
18	May 25	1986	Coca-Cola 600	Charlotte Motor Speedway	Concord, North Carolina
19	October 5	1986	Oakwood Homes 500	Charlotte Motor Speedway	Concord, North Carolina
20	November 2	1986	Atlanta Journal 500	Atlanta International Raceway	Hampton, Georgia
21	March 1	1987	Goodwrench 500	North Carolina Motor Speedway	Rockingham, North Carolina
22	March 8	1987	Miller High Life 400	Richmond Fairgrounds Raceway	Richmond, Virginia
23	March 29	1987	TranSouth 500	Darlington Raceway	Darlington, South Carolina
24	April 5	1987	First Union 400	North Wilkesboro Speedway	North Wilkesboro, North Carolina
25	April 12	1987	Valleydale Meats 500	Bristol International Raceway	Bristol, Tennessee
26	April 26	1987	Sovran Bank 500	Martinsville Speedway	Ridgeway, Virginia
27	June 28	1987	Miller American 400	Michigan International Speedway	Brooklyn, Michigan
28	July 19	1987	Summer 500	Pocono International Raceway	Long Pond, Pennsylvania
29	August 22	1987	Busch 500	Bristol International Raceway	Bristol, Tennessee
30	September 6	1987	Southern 500	Darlington Raceway	Darlington, South Carolina
31	September 13	1987	Wrangler Jeans Indigo 400	Richmond Fairgrounds Raceway	Richmond, Virginia
32	March 20	1988	Motorcraft Quality Parts 500	Atlanta International Raceway	Hampton, Georgia
33	April 24	1988	Pannill Sweatshirts 500	Martinsville Speedway	Ridgeway, Virginia
34	August 27	1988	Busch 500	Bristol International Raceway	Bristol, Tennessee
35	April 16	1989	First Union 400	North Wilkesboro Speedway	North Wilkesboro, North Carolina
36	June 4	1989	Budweiser 500	Dover Downs International Speedway	Dover, Delaware
37	September 3	1989	Heinz Southern 500	Darlington Raceway	Darlington, South Carolina
38	September 17	1989	Peak Performance 500	Dover Downs International Speedway	Dover, Delaware
39	November 19	1989	Atlanta Journal 500	Atlanta International Raceway	Hampton, Georgia
40	March 18	1990	Motorcraft Quality Parts 500	Atlanta International Raceway	Hampton, Georgia
41	April 1	1990	TranSouth 500	Darlington Raceway	Darlington, South Carolina
42	May 6	1990	Winston 500	Talladega Superspeedway	Lincoln, Alabama
43	June 24	1990	Miller Genuine Draft 400	Michigan International Speedway	Brooklyn, Michigan
44	July 7	1990	Pepsi 400	Daytona International Speedway	Daytona Beach, Florida
45	July 29	1990	DieHard 500	Talladega Superspeedway	Lincoln, Alabama
46	September 2	1990	Heinz Southern 500	Darlington Raceway	Darlington, South Carolina
47	September 9	1990	Miller Genuine Draft 400	Richmond International Raceway	Richmond, Virginia
48	November 4	1990	Checker 500	Phoenix International Raceway	Avondale, Arizona
49	February 24	1991	Pontiac Excitement 400	Richmond International Raceway	Richmond, Virginia
50	April 28	1991	Hanes 500	Martinsville Speedway	Ridgeway, Virginia
51	July 28	1991	DieHard 500	Talladega Superspeedway	Lincoln, Alabama
52	September 29	1991	Tyson Holly Farms 400	North Wilkesboro Speedway	North Wilkesboro, North Carolina
53	May 24	1992	Coca-Cola 600	Charlotte Motor Speedway	Concord, North Carolina
54	March 28	1993	TranSouth 500	Darlington Raceway	Darlington, South Carolina
55	May 30	1993	Coca-Cola 600	Charlotte Motor Speedway	Concord, North Carolina
56	June 6	1993	Budweiser 500	Dover Downs International Speedway	Dover, Delaware
57	July 3	1993	Pepsi 400	Daytona International Speedway	Daytona Beach, Florida
58	July 18	1993	Miller Genuine Draft 500	Pocono International Raceway	Long Pond, Pennsylvania
59	July 25	1993	DieHard 500	Talladega Superspeedway	Lincoln, Alabama
60	March 27	1994	TranSouth Financial 400	Darlington Raceway	Darlington, South Carolina
61	April 10	1994	Food City 500	Bristol International Raceway	Bristol, Tennessee
62	May 1	1994	Winston Select 500	Talladega Superspeedway	Lincoln, Alabama
63	October 23	1994	AC Delco 500	North Carolina Motor Speedway	Rockingham, North Carolina
64	April 9	1995	First Union 400	North Wilkesboro Speedway	North Wilkesboro, North Carolina
65	May 7	1995	Save Mart Supermarkets 300	Sears Point Raceway	Sonoma, California
66	August 5	1995	Brickyard 400	Indianapolis Motor Speedway	Speedway, Indiana
67	September 24	1995	Goody's 500	Martinsville Speedway	Ridgeway, Virginia
68	November 12	1995	NAPA 500	Atlanta Motor Speedway	Hampton, Georgia
69	February 26	1996	Goodwrench Service 400	North Carolina Motor Speedway	Rockingham, North Carolina
70	March 10	1996	Purolator 500	Atlanta Motor Speedway	Hampton, Georgia
71	February 15	1998	Daytona 500	Daytona International Speedway	Daytona Beach, Florida
72	April 25	1999	DieHard 500	Talladega Superspeedway	Lincoln, Alabama
73	August 28	1999	Goody's Headache Powder 500	Bristol Motor Speedway	Bristol, Tennessee
74	October 17	1999	Winston 500	Talladega Superspeedway	Lincoln, Alabama
75	March 12	2000	Cracker Barrel Old Country Store 500	Atlanta Motor Speedway	Hampton, Georgia
76	October 15	2000	Winston 500	Talladega Superspeedway	Lincoln, Alabama

=== Wins by track ===
Earnhardt won on 17 different tracks in the Cup Series during his career. Most of his success came at Talladega (10), Bristol, Atlanta, and Darlington (9), with these four tracks accounting for 37 of his 76 wins. Earnhardt only won three points-paying Winston Cup races at Daytona, although he won six Busch Clashes, twelve Twin 125 qualifying races, and seven Busch series races, accounting for

NASCAR Cup Series victories by racetrack
Order	Track	Wins	First Win	Last Win
1	Talladega Superspeedway	10	1983	2000
2	Bristol Motor Speedway	9	1979	1999
2	Atlanta Motor Speedway	9	1980	2000
2	Darlington Raceway	9	1982	1994
5	Martinsville Speedway	6	1980	1995
6	Charlotte Motor Speedway	5	1980	1993
6	Richmond International Raceway	5	1985	1991
6	North Wilkesboro Speedway	5	1986	1995
9	North Carolina Motor Speedway	3	1987	1996
9	Dover International Speedway	3	1989	1993
9	Daytona International Speedway	3	1990	1998
12	Nashville Fairgrounds Speedway	2	1980	1983
12	Michigan International Speedway	2	1987	1990
12	Pocono Raceway	2	1987	1993
15	Phoenix International Raceway	1	1990	1990
15	Indianapolis Motor Speedway	1	1995	1995
15	Sears Point Raceway	1	1995	1995

==== Exhibition races ====
NASCAR exhibition victories
No.	Date	Season	Race	Track	Location
1	February 10	1980	Busch Clash	Daytona International Speedway	Daytona Beach, Florida
2	February 17	1983	First UNO Twin 125 Qualifier	Daytona International Speedway	Daytona Beach, Florida
3	February 9	1986	Busch Clash	Daytona International Speedway	Daytona Beach, Florida
4	February 13	1986	Second 7-Eleven Twin 125	Daytona International Speedway	Daytona Beach, Florida
5	May 17	1987	The Winston	Charlotte Motor Speedway	Concord, North Carolina
6	February 7	1988	Busch Clash	Daytona International Speedway	Daytona Beach, Florida
7	February 15	1990	Second Twin 125 Qualifier	Daytona International Speedway	Daytona Beach, Florida
8	May 20	1990	The Winston	Charlotte Motor Speedway	Concord, North Carolina
9	February 10	1991	Busch Clash	Daytona International Speedway	Daytona Beach, Florida
10	February 14	1991	Gatorade Twin 125 Qualifier #2	Daytona International Speedway	Daytona Beach, Florida
11	February 13	1992	Gatorade Twin 125 Qualifier #1	Daytona International Speedway	Daytona Beach, Florida
12	February 7	1993	Busch Clash	Daytona International Speedway	Daytona Beach, Florida
13	February 11	1993	Gatorade Twin 125 Qualifier #2	Daytona International Speedway	Daytona Beach, Florida
14	May 22	1993	The Winston	Charlotte Motor Speedway	Concord, North Carolina
15	February 17	1994	Gatorade Twin 125 #2	Daytona International Speedway	Daytona Beach, Florida
16	February 12	1995	Busch Clash	Daytona International Speedway	Daytona Beach, Florida
17	February 16	1995	Gatorade Twin 125 #2	Daytona International Speedway	Daytona Beach, Florida
18	February 15	1996	Gatorade Twin 125 #1	Daytona International Speedway	Daytona Beach, Florida
19	February 13	1997	Gatorade Twin 125 #2	Daytona International Speedway	Daytona Beach, Florida
20	February 12	1998	Gatorade Twin 125 #2	Daytona International Speedway	Daytona Beach, Florida
21	February 11	1999	Gatorade Twin 125 #2	Daytona International Speedway	Daytona Beach, Florida

=== Busch Series ===
Earnhardt competed part-time in the NASCAR Busch Series from 1982 to 1994, winning 21 races. He most notably won the Daytona 300 seven times, a feat later replicated by Tony Stewart. His first win in 1982 was the inaugural race in what was then known as the Budweiser Late Model Sportsman Series. His first four victories came in cars owned by Robert Gee before starting Dale Earnhardt, Inc. in 1984. He would win his last 17 races in the No. 8 and No. 3 from 1985 to 1994.

NASCAR Busch Series victories
No.	Date	Season	Race	Track	Location
1	February 13	1982	Goody's 300	Daytona International Speedway	Daytona Beach, Florida
2	April 23	1982	Budweiser 200	Caraway Speedway	Asheboro, North Carolina
3	March 5	1983	Coca-Cola 200	North Carolina Motor Speedway	Rockingham, North Carolina
4	May 28	1983	Mello Yello 300	Charlotte Motor Speedway	Concord, North Carolina
5	March 2	1985	Komfort Koach 200	North Carolina Motor Speedway	Rockingham, North Carolina
6	February 15	1986	Goody's 300	Daytona International Speedway	Daytona Beach, Florida
7	March 1	1986	Protecta-Liner 200	North Carolina Motor Speedway	Rockingham, North Carolina
8	September 1	1986	Gatorade 200	Darlington Raceway	Darlington, South Carolina
9	September 6	1986	Freedlander 200	Richmond Fairgrounds Raceway	Richmond, Virginia
10	October 4	1986	All Pro 300	Charlotte Motor Speedway	Concord, North Carolina
11	March 28	1987	Country Squire 200	Darlington Raceway	Darlington, South Carolina
12	April 9	1988	Budweiser 200	Bristol International Raceway	Bristol, Tennessee
13	February 17	1990	Goody's 300	Daytona International Speedway	Daytona Beach, Florida
14	March 3	1990	Goodwrench 200	North Carolina Motor Speedway	Rockingham, North Carolina
15	February 16	1991	Goody's 300	Daytona International Speedway	Daytona Beach, Florida
16	May 25	1991	Champion 300	Charlotte Motor Speedway	Concord, North Carolina
17	August 31	1991	Gatorade 200	Darlington Raceway	Darlington, South Carolina
18	February 15	1992	Goody's 300	Daytona International Speedway	Daytona Beach, Florida
19	February 13	1993	Goody's 300	Daytona International Speedway	Daytona Beach, Florida
20	July 24	1993	Fram Filter 500K	Talladega Superspeedway	Lincoln, Alabama
21	February 19	1994	Goody's 300	Daytona International Speedway	Daytona Beach, Florida

=== Winston West Series ===
NASCAR Winston West Series victories
No.	Date	Season	Race	Track	Location
1	June 23	1985	Stroh's Beer 200	Seattle International Raceways	Kent, Washington

=== North Tour ===
NASCAR North Tour victories
No.	Date	Season	Race	Track	Location
1	August 28	1983	Motion 250	Cayuga International Speedway	Hamilton, Ontario

== See also ==
- List of all-time NASCAR Cup Series winners
