= List of NASCAR race wins by Joey Logano =

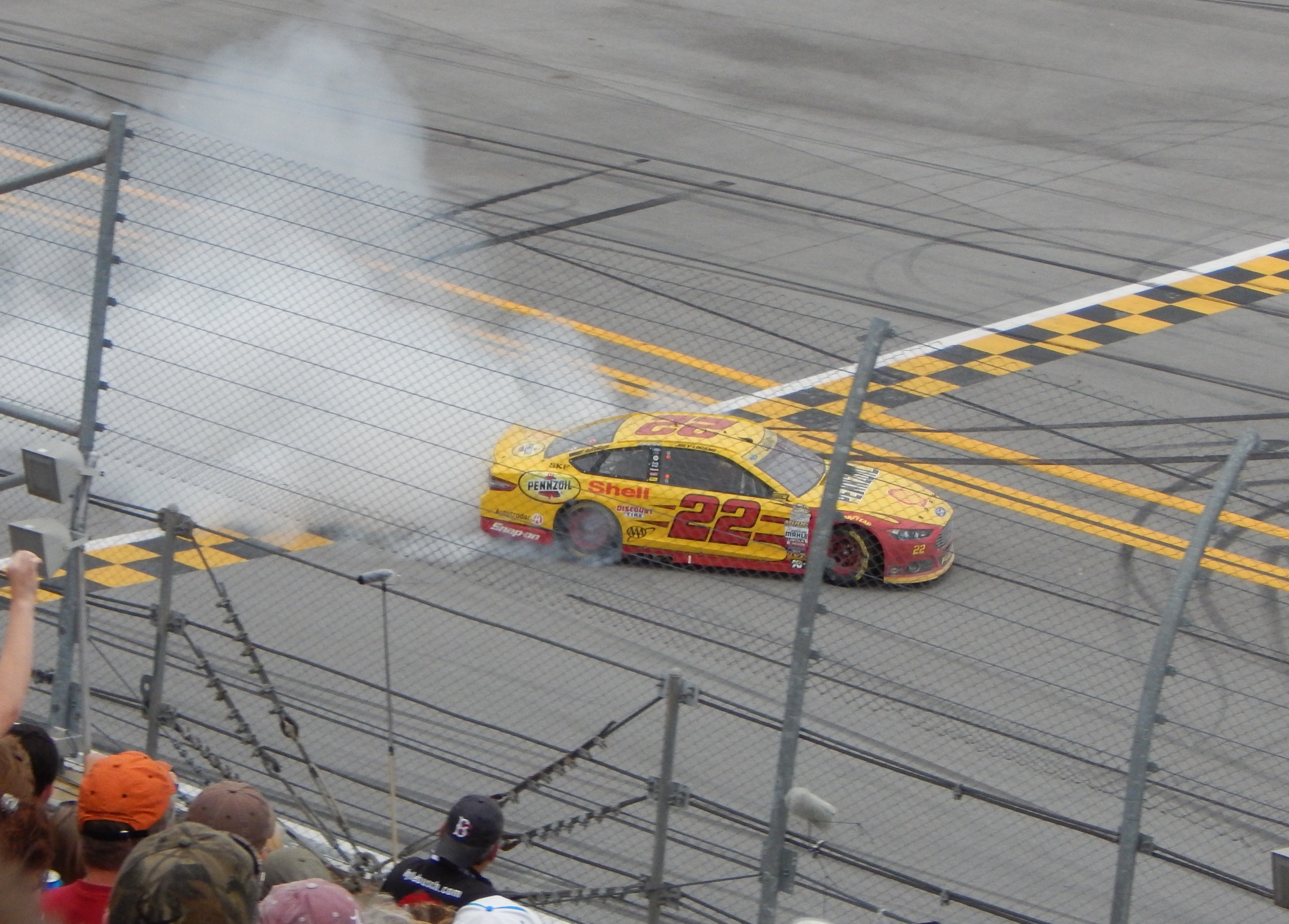
Logano celebrates his 2015 Talladega win

Over the course of his racing career, Joey Logano has won a total of 72 NASCAR races across NASCAR's top three Series. The three-time Cup Series champion has won 40 races in the first-tier series, 30 in the Xfinity Series and two (from nine races) in the Truck Series.

== NASCAR ==
=== Cup Series ===
Logano has won the NASCAR Cup Series title in 2018, 2022, and 2024. He also triumphed at the Daytona 500 in 2015. Logano's maiden victory at the 2009 Lenox Industrial Tools 301 while aged 19 years, 1 month, and 4 days made him the youngest ever winner in Cup Series history.

NASCAR Cup Series victories
No.	Date	Season	Race	Margin	Track	Ref
1	June 28, 2009	2009	Lenox Industrial Tools 301	Rain	New Hampshire Motor Speedway	
2	June 10, 2012	2012	Pocono 400	0.997	Pocono Raceway	
3	August 18, 2013	2013	Pure Michigan 400	1.018	Michigan International Speedway	
4	April 7, 2014	2014	Duck Commander 500	0.476	Texas Motor Speedway	
5	April 26, 2014	2014	Toyota Owners 400	0.946	Richmond International Raceway	
6	August 23, 2014	2014	Irwin Tools Night Race	0.390	Bristol Motor Speedway	
7	September 21, 2014	2014	Sylvania 300	1.150	New Hampshire Motor Speedway	
8	October 5, 2014	2014	Hollywood Casino 400	0.479	Kansas Speedway	
9	February 22, 2015	2015	Daytona 500	Caution	Daytona International Speedway	
10	August 9, 2015	2015	Cheez-It 355 at The Glen	5.273	Watkins Glen International	
11	August 22, 2015	2015	Irwin Tools Night Race	0.220	Bristol Motor Speedway	
12	October 11, 2015	2015	Bank of America 500	0.703	Charlotte Motor Speedway	
13	October 18, 2015	2015	Hollywood Casino 400	0.491	Kansas Speedway	
14	October 25, 2015	2015	CampingWorld.com 500 at Talladega	Caution	Talladega Superspeedway	
15	June 12, 2016	2016	FireKeepers Casino 400	0.889	Michigan International Speedway	
16	October 23, 2016	2016	Hellmann's 500	0.124	Talladega Superspeedway	
17	November 13, 2016	2016	Can-Am 500	0.587	Phoenix International Raceway	
18	April 30, 2017	2017	Toyota Owners 400	0.775	Richmond Raceway	
19	April 29, 2018	2018	GEICO 500	0.127	Talladega Superspeedway	
20	October 28, 2018	2018	First Data 500	0.107	Martinsville Speedway	
21	November 18, 2018	2018	Ford EcoBoost 400	1.725	Homestead-Miami Speedway	
22	March 3, 2019	2019	Pennzoil 400	0.236	Las Vegas Motor Speedway	
23	June 10, 2019	2019	FireKeepers Casino 400	0.147	Michigan International Speedway	
24	February 23, 2020	2020	Pennzoil 400	Caution	Las Vegas Motor Speedway	
25	March 8, 2020	2020	FanShield 500	0.276	Phoenix Raceway	
26	October 18, 2020	2020	Hollywood Casino 400	0.312	Kansas Speedway	
27	March 29, 2021	2021	Food City Dirt Race	0.554	Bristol Motor Speedway (Dirt)	
28	May 8, 2022	2022	Goodyear 400	0.775	Darlington Raceway	
29	June 5, 2022	2022	Enjoy Illinois 300	0.655	World Wide Technology Raceway	
30	October 16, 2022	2022	South Point 400	0.817	Las Vegas Motor Speedway	
31	November 6, 2022	2022	NASCAR Cup Series Championship Race	0.301	Phoenix Raceway	
32	March 19, 2023	2023	Ambetter Health 400	0.193	Atlanta Motor Speedway	
33	June 30, 2024	2024	Ally 400	0.068	Nashville Superspeedway	
34	September 8, 2024	2024	Quaker State 400	Caution	Atlanta Motor Speedway	
35	October 20, 2024	2024	South Point 400	0.662	Las Vegas Motor Speedway	
36	November 10, 2024	2024	NASCAR Cup Series Championship Race	0.330	Phoenix Raceway	
37	May 4, 2025	2025	Würth 400	0.346	Texas Motor Speedway	
38	July 19, 2026	2026	Window World 450	0.859	North Wilkesboro Speedway	
39	August 15, 2026	2026	Cook Out 400	0.392	Richmond Raceway	
40	September 19, 2026	2026	Bass Pro Shops Night Race	1.248	Bristol Motor Speedway	

=== Xfinity Series ===
Though Logano never contested a full season in the Xfinity Series, he has racked up 30 wins — 18 for Joe Gibbs Racing and 12 for Team Penske. Logano earned his maiden victory in the series at the 2008 Meijer 300, also making him the youngest winner in NASCAR Xfinity Series history at age 18 years and 21 days.

Xfinity Series victories
No.	Date	Season	Race	Margin	Track	Ref
1	June 14, 2008	2008	Meijer 300	2.259	Kentucky Speedway	
2	April 11, 2009	2009	Nashville 300	0.487	Nashville Superspeedway	
3	June 13, 2009	2009	Meijer 300	1.624	Kentucky Speedway	
4	July 10, 2009	2009	Dollar General 300 (Chicagoland)	2.619	Chicagoland Speedway	
5	October 3, 2009	2009	Kansas Lottery 300	0.574	Kansas Speedway	
6	October 10, 2009	2009	Copart 300	0.514	Auto Club Speedway	
7	June 12, 2010	2010	Alsco 300 (Kentucky)	0.662	Kentucky Speedway	
8	October 2, 2010	2010	Kansas Lottery 300	0.315	Kansas Speedway	
9	July 1, 2011	2011	Subway Jalapeño 250	0.040	Daytona International Speedway	
10	March 24, 2012	2012	Royal Purple 300	1.066	Auto Club Speedway	
11	May 5, 2012	2012	Aaron's 312	0.034	Talladega Superspeedway	
12	May 11, 2012	2012	VFW Sport Clips Help a Hero 200	0.255	Darlington Raceway	
13	June 2, 2012	2012	5-hour Energy 200	1.526	Dover International Speedway	
14	June 16, 2012	2012	Alliance Truck Parts 250	0.208	Michigan International Speedway	
15	August 24, 2012	2012	Food City 250	0.503	Bristol Motor Speedway	
16	September 29, 2012	2012	OneMain Financial 200	0.876	Dover International Speedway	
17	October 12, 2012	2012	Dollar General 300	2.760	Charlotte Motor Speedway	
18	November 10, 2012	2012	Great Clips 200	0.668	Phoenix International Raceway	
19	June 1, 2013	2013	5-hour Energy 200	0.576	Dover Motor Speedway	
20	July 21, 2013	2013	STP 300	0.291	Chicagoland Speedway	
21	September 28, 2013	2013	5-hour Energy 200	14.590	Dover International Speedway	
22	March 14, 2015	2015	Axalta Faster. Tougher. Brighter. 200	0.293	Phoenix Raceway	
23	April 18, 2015	2015	Drive to Stop Diabetes 300	1.172	Bristol Motor Speedway	
24	May 2, 2015	2015	Winn-Dixie 300	0.130	Talladega Superspeedway	
25	August 8, 2015	2015	Zippo 200 at The Glen	1.066	Watkins Glen International	
26	August 6, 2016	2016	Zippo 200 at The Glen	1.517	Watkins Glen International	
27	October 9, 2016	2016	Drive for the Cure 300	0.462	Charlotte Motor Speedway	
28	March 11, 2017	2017	Boyd Gaming 300	0.602	Las Vegas Motor Speedway	
29	March 17, 2018	2018	Roseanne 300	1.429	Auto Club Speedway	
30	August 4, 2018	2018	Zippo 200 at The Glen	3.362	Watkins Glen International	

=== Truck Series ===
In the Craftsman Truck Series, Logano has won two races, having only made sporadic appearances in the championship.

NASCAR Truck Series victories
No.	Date	Season	Race	Margin	Track	Source
1	March 28, 2015	2015	Kroger 250	0.431	Martinsville Speedway	
2	April 8, 2023	2023	Weather Guard Truck Race on Dirt	1.241	Bristol Motor Speedway (Dirt)	

== See also ==
- List of all-time NASCAR Cup Series winners
