= List of all-time NASCAR Cup Series winners =

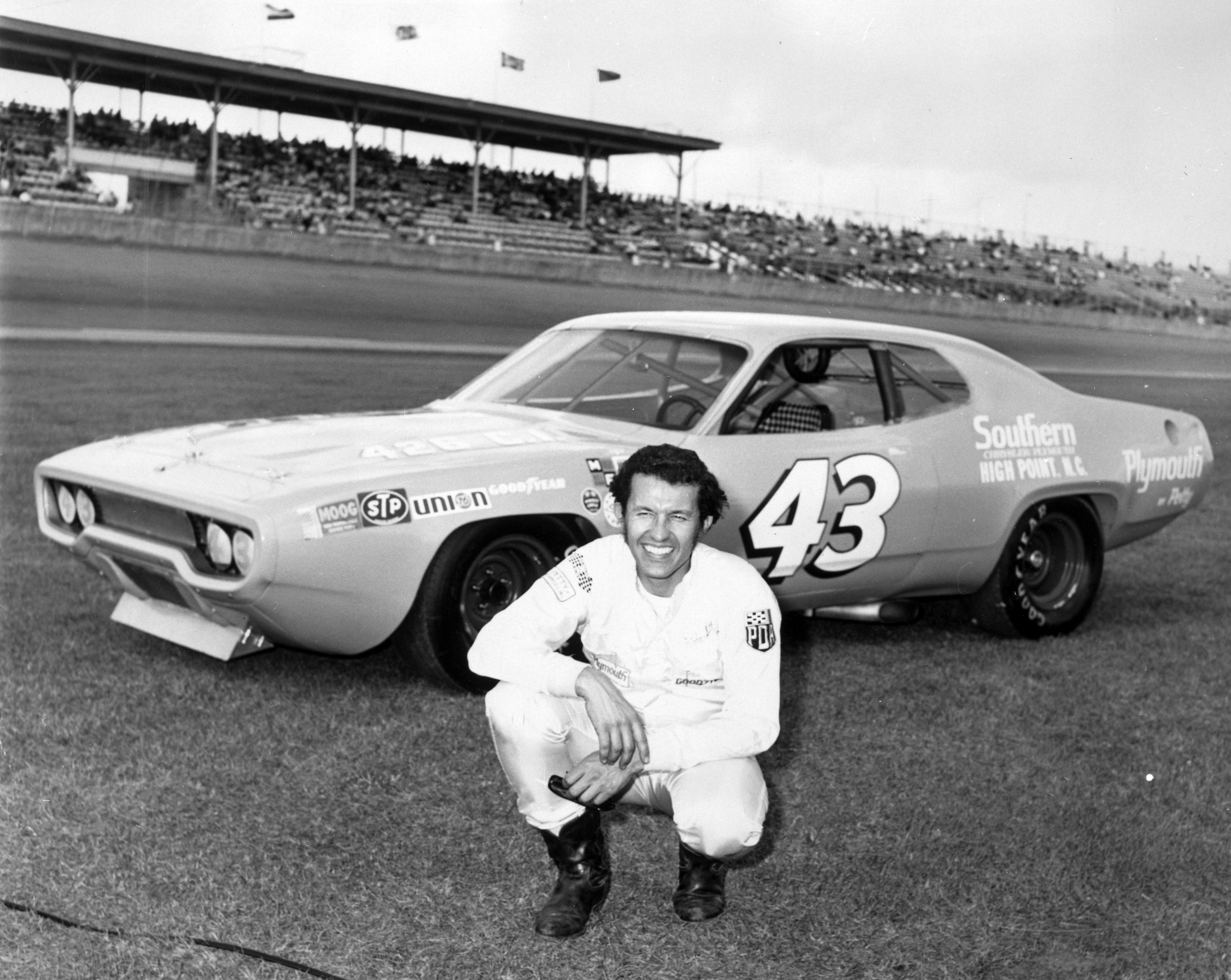
Richard Petty, the winningest Cup Series driver of all time.

The NASCAR Cup Series is the premier American stock car racing series administered by the National Association of Stock Car Auto Racing (NASCAR), the official sanctioning body of the sport of stock car racing in North America. Previous names of the series include Strictly Stock in 1949; Grand National Series from 1950 to 1970; Winston Cup Series between 1971 and 2003; Nextel Cup Series from 2004 to 2007; Sprint Cup Series between 2008 and 2016 and Monster Energy NASCAR Cup Series from 2017 to 2019.

== Total wins ==
Rule changes in 1972 established a minimum distance of 250 miles (400 km) for points-paying Cup Series events (reduced to 186.4 miles (300.0 km) in 1974 due to the ongoing energy crisis). This led to the elimination of shorter races (50 to 150 miles) from the schedule. Seasons since 1972 are referenced as the "modern era" largely due to the schedule and distance changes. Years since 2004 are generally referred to as the "Chase Era or Playoffs Era." Only points-paying championship races count towards the total.

Richard Petty holds the record for the most NASCAR Cup Series wins in history with 200. David Pearson is second with 105 victories, and Jeff Gordon is third with 93 wins. Petty also holds the record for the longest time between his first win and his last. He won his first race in 1960 and his last in 1984, a span of 24 years. Bill Elliott holds the record for the longest period of time between two race victories, seven years between the 1994 Mountain Dew Southern 500 and the 2001 Pennzoil Freedom 400. Chris Buescher had to wait the longest time between his maiden victory at the 2016 Pennsylvania 400 and his second win – coming 2,238 days later at the 2022 Bass Pro Shops Night Race, a span of 222 races. Michael Waltrip holds the distinction of having the longest time in the series before his maiden victory. He competed in 463 Cup Series races before he achieved his first win at the 2001 Daytona 500. Petty holds the record for the most consecutive wins, having won ten races in succession in 1967. Joey Logano is the youngest winner of a Cup Series race; he was 19 years old, 1 month, and 4 days old when he won the 2009 Lenox Industrial Tools 301. Harry Gant is the oldest winner of a Cup Series race; he was 52 years, 7 months, and 6 days old when he won the 1992 Champion Spark Plug 400.

=== Win table ===
All figures correct as of the Season Finale 400 at Homestead-Miami Speedway (November 8, 2026).

Key
*	NASCAR Cup Series Champion
#	Driver is competing full-time in the 2026 season
°	Driver is competing part-time in the 2026 season
^	Driver has been inducted into the NASCAR Hall of Fame

Rank	Driver	Strictly Stock (1949) Grand National (1950–1970)	Winston Cup (1971–2003)	Playoffs/ Chase era (2004–present)	Modern era total (1972–present)	Combined total
1	Richard Petty * ^	119	81	0	60	200
2	David Pearson * ^	58	47	0	45	105
3	Jeff Gordon * ^	0	64	29	93	93
4	Bobby Allison * ^	19	66	0	55	85 (Note: Until 2024, Allison's win at 1971 Myers Brothers 250 was credited as a Grand American win, instead of a NASCAR Cup Series win.)
5	Darrell Waltrip * ^	0	84	0	84	84
6	Jimmie Johnson * ^ °	0	6	77	83	83
6	Cale Yarborough * ^	14	69	0	69	83
8	Dale Earnhardt * ^	0	76	0	76	76
9	Denny Hamlin #	0	0	64	64	64
10	Kyle Busch *	0	0	63	63	63
11	Kevin Harvick * ^	0	4	56	60	60
12	Rusty Wallace * ^	0	54	1	55	55
13	Lee Petty * ^	54	0	0	0	54
14	Ned Jarrett * ^	50	0	0	0	50
14	Junior Johnson ^	50	0	0	0	50
16	Tony Stewart * ^	0	17	32	49	49
17	Herb Thomas * ^	48	0	0	0	48
18	Buck Baker * ^	46	0	0	0	46
19	Bill Elliott * ^	0	44	0	44	44
20	Joey Logano * #	0	0	40	40	40
20	Mark Martin ^	0	33	7	40	40
22	Tim Flock * ^	39	0	0	0	39
22	Matt Kenseth * ^	0	7	32	39	39
24	Bobby Isaac * ^	32	5	0	1	37
25	Brad Keselowski * #	0	0	36	36	36
26	Kyle Larson * #	0	0	35	35	35
27	Kurt Busch * ^	0	8	26	34	34
27	Martin Truex Jr. *	0	0	34	34	34
29	Fireball Roberts ^	33	0	0	0	33
30	Dale Jarrett * ^	0	31	1	32	32
31	Carl Edwards ^	0	0	28	28	28
31	Rex White * ^	28	0	0	0	28
33	Dale Earnhardt Jr. ^	0	9	17	26	26
33	Fred Lorenzen ^	26	0	0	0	26
35	Jim Paschal	25	0	0	0	25
35	Joe Weatherly * ^	25	0	0	0	25
37	Chase Elliott * #	0	0	23	23	23
37	Ricky Rudd ^	0	23	0	23	23
39	Terry Labonte * ^	0	22	0	22	22
40	Ryan Blaney * #	0	0	20	20	21
40	Jeff Burton ^	0	17	4	21	21
40	Bobby Labonte * ^	0	21	0	21	21
40	Benny Parsons * ^	0	21	0	21	21
40	Jack Smith	21	0	0	0	21
45	Speedy Thompson	20	0	0	0	20
46	Davey Allison ^	0	19	0	19	19
46	Buddy Baker ^	3	15	0	16	19
46	Greg Biffle	0	1	18	19	19
46	Fonty Flock	19	0	0	0	19
50	Geoffrey Bodine	0	18	0	18	18
50	Neil Bonnett	0	18	0	18	18
50	Harry Gant ^	0	18	0	18	18
50	Kasey Kahne	0	0	18	18	18
50	Ryan Newman	0	9	9	18	18
55	William Byron #	0	0	17	17	17
55	Marvin Panch	17	0	0	0	17
55	Curtis Turner ^	17	0	0	0	17
58	Ernie Irvan	0	15	0	15	15
59	Christopher Bell #	0	0	14	14	14
59	Dick Hutcherson	14	0	0	0	14
59	Tyler Reddick #	0	0	14	14	14
59	LeeRoy Yarbrough	14	0	0	0	14
63	Dick Rathmann	13	0	0	0	13
63	Tim Richmond	0	13	0	13	13
65	Donnie Allison ^	5	5	0	4	10
65	Clint Bowyer	0	0	10	10	10
65	Sterling Marlin	0	10	0	10	10
68	Paul Goldsmith	9	0	0	0	9
68	Cotton Owens ^	9	0	0	0	9
68	Bob Welborn	9	0	0	0	9
71	Alex Bowman #	0	0	8	8	8
71	Chase Briscoe #	0	0	8	8	8
71	Kyle Petty	0	8	0	8	8
71	Shane van Gisbergen #	0	0	8	8	8
75	Darel Dieringer	7	0	0	0	7
75	A. J. Foyt	3	4	0	2	7
75	Jamie McMurray	0	1	6	7	7
75	Jim Reed	7	0	0	0	7
75	Marshall Teague	7	0	0	0	7
80	Chris Buescher #	0	0	6	6	6
80	Ross Chastain #	0	0	6	6	6
80	Austin Dillon #	0	0	6	6	6
83	Ward Burton	0	5	0	5	5
83	Dan Gurney	5	0	0	0	5
83	Alan Kulwicki * ^	0	5	0	5	5
83	Tiny Lund	5	0	0	0	5
83	Dave Marcis	0	5	0	5	5
83	Jeremy Mayfield	0	3	2	5	5
83	Ralph Moody ^	5	0	0	0	5
90	Lloyd Dane	4	0	0	0	4
90	Bob Flock	4	0	0	0	4
90	Charlie Glotzbach	3	1	0	0	4
90	Eddie Gray	4	0	0	0	4
90	Bobby Hamilton	0	4	0	4	4
90	Pete Hamilton	3	1	0	0	4
90	Parnelli Jones	4	0	0	0	4
90	Hershel McGriff ^	4	0	0	0	4
90	Joe Nemechek	0	3	1	4	4
90	Eddie Pagan	4	0	0	0	4
90	Ken Schrader	0	4	0	4	4
90	Morgan Shepherd	0	4	0	4	4
90	Nelson Stacy	4	0	0	0	4
90	Ricky Stenhouse Jr. #	0	0	4	4	4
90	Billy Wade	4	0	0	0	4
90	Michael Waltrip	0	4	0	4	4
90	Glen Wood ^	4	0	0	0	4
107	A. J. Allmendinger #	0	0	3	3	3
107	Aric Almirola	0	0	3	3	3
107	Bill Blair	3	0	0	0	3
107	Austin Cindric #	0	0	3	3	3
107	Robby Gordon	0	3	0	3	3
107	Erik Jones #	0	0	3	3	3
107	Dick Linder	3	0	0	0	3
107	Frank Mundy	3	0	0	0	3
107	Elliott Sadler	0	1	2	3	3
107	Gwyn Staley	3	0	0	0	3
107	Daniel Suárez #	0	0	3	3	3
107	Brian Vickers	0	0	3	3	3
107	Bubba Wallace #	0	0	3	3	3
120	Marcos Ambrose	0	0	2	2	2
120	John Andretti	0	2	0	2	2
120	Johnny Beauchamp	2	0	0	0	2
120	Red Byron * ^	2	0	0	0	2
120	Derrike Cope	0	2	0	2	2
120	Ricky Craven	0	2	0	2	2
120	Ray Elder	0	2	0	1	2
120	Ty Gibbs #	0	0	2	2	2
120	Corey Heim °	0	0	2	2	2
120	James Hylton	1	1	0	1	2
120	Bobby Johns	2	0	0	0	2
120	Joe Lee Johnson	2	0	0	0	2
120	Al Keller	2	0	0	0	2
120	Elmo Langley	2	0	0	0	2
120	Danny Letner	2	0	0	0	2
120	Michael McDowell #	0	0	2	2	2
120	Juan Pablo Montoya	0	0	2	2	2
120	Billy Myers	2	0	0	0	2
120	Jimmy Pardue	2	0	0	0	2
120	Steve Park	0	2	0	2	2
120	Tom Pistone	2	0	0	0	2
120	Marvin Porter	2	0	0	0	2
120	David Ragan	0	0	2	2	2
120	David Reutimann	0	0	2	2	2
120	Gober Sosebee	2	0	0	0	2
120	Jimmy Spencer	0	2	0	2	2
120	Emanuel Zervakis	2	0	0	0	2
147	Johnny Allen	1	0	0	0	1
147	Bill Amick	1	0	0	0	1
147	Mario Andretti	1	0	0	0	1
147	Earl Balmer	1	0	0	0	1
147	Trevor Bayne	0	0	1	1	1
147	Johnny Benson Jr.	0	1	0	1	1
147	Josh Berry #	0	0	1	1	1
147	Brett Bodine	0	1	0	1	1
147	Ron Bouchard	0	1	0	1	1
147	Richard Brickhouse	1	0	0	0	1
147	Dick Brooks	0	1	0	1	1
147	Bob Burdick	1	0	0	0	1
147	Marvin Burke	1	0	0	0	1
147	Harrison Burton °	0	0	1	1	1
147	Neil Cole	1	0	0	0	1
147	Jim Cook	1	0	0	0	1
147	Cole Custer #	0	0	1	1	1
147	Mark Donohue	0	1	0	1	1
147	Joe Eubanks	1	0	0	0	1
147	Lou Figaro	1	0	0	0	1
147	Jimmy Florian	1	0	0	0	1
147	Larry Frank	1	0	0	0	1
147	Danny Graves	1	0	0	0	1
147	Royce Hagerty	1	0	0	0	1
147	Justin Haley	0	0	1	1	1
147	Bobby Hillin Jr.	0	1	0	1	1
147	Carson Hocevar #	0	0	1	1	1
147	Jim Hurtubise	1	0	0	0	1
147	John Kieper	1	0	0	0	1
147	Harold Kite	1	0	0	0	1
147	Paul Lewis	1	0	0	0	1
147	Johnny Mantz	1	0	0	0	1
147	Sam McQuagg	1	0	0	0	1
147	Casey Mears °	0	0	1	1	1
147	Paul Menard	0	0	1	1	1
147	Lloyd Moore	1	0	0	0	1
147	Jerry Nadeau	0	1	0	1	1
147	Norm Nelson	1	0	0	0	1
147	Bill Norton	1	0	0	0	1
147	Phil Parsons	0	1	0	1	1
147	Dick Passwater	1	0	0	0	1
147	Lennie Pond	0	1	0	1	1
147	Ryan Preece #	0	0	1	1	1
147	Bill Rexford *	1	0	0	0	1
147	Jody Ridley	0	1	0	1	1
147	Shorty Rollins	1	0	0	0	1
147	Jim Roper	1	0	0	0	1
147	Earl Ross	0	1	0	1	1
147	John Rostek	1	0	0	0	1
147	Johnny Rutherford	1	0	0	0	1
147	Greg Sacks	0	1	0	1	1
147	Leon Sales	1	0	0	0	1
147	Frankie Schneider	1	0	0	0	1
147	Wendell Scott ^	1	0	0	0	1
147	Buddy Shuman	1	0	0	0	1
147	Regan Smith	0	0	1	1	1
147	John Soares	1	0	0	0	1
147	Lake Speed	0	1	0	1	1
147	Chuck Stevenson	1	0	0	0	1
147	Donald Thomas	1	0	0	0	1
147	Tommy Thompson	1	0	0	0	1
147	Art Watts	1	0	0	0	1
147	Danny Weinberg	1	0	0	0	1
147	Jack White	1	0	0	0	1

=== Record progression ===
Win record	Driver	Race	Name	Track	Date	References
1	Jim Roper	1949-01	No name	Charlotte Speedway	19 June 1949	
1	Red Byron	1949-02	No name	Daytona Beach Road Course	10 July 1949	
1	Bob Flock	1949-03	No name	Occoneechee Speedway	7 August 1949	
1	Curtis Turner	1949-04	No name	Langhorne Speedway	11 September 1949	
1	Jack White	1949-05	No name	Hamburg Speedway	18 September 1949	
2	Red Byron	1949-06	No name	Martinsville Speedway	25 September 1949	
2	Bob Flock	1949-08	1949 Wilkes 200	North Wilkesboro Speedway	16 October 1949	
2	Curtis Turner	1950-03	No name	Langhorne Speedway	16 April 1950	
3	Curtis Turner	1950-04	No name	Martinsville Speedway	21 May 1950	
4	Curtis Turner	1950-08	No name	Monroe County Fairgrounds	2 July 1950	
5	Curtis Turner	1950-09	No name	Charlotte Speedway	23 July 1950	
6	Curtis Turner	1951-02	No name	Charlotte Speedway	1 April 1951	
7	Curtis Turner	1951-08	No name	Martinsville Speedway	6 May 1951	
8	Curtis Turner	1951-12	No name	Dayton Speedway	24 June 1951	
8	Fonty Flock	1951-30	No name	Wilson Speedway	30 September 1949	
9	Fonty Flock	1951-36	1951 Wilkes 200	North Wilkesboro Speedway	21 October 1951	
9	Tim Flock	1952-01	No name	Palm Beach Speedway	20 January 1952	
9	Herb Thomas	1952-04	1952 Wilkes County 200	North Wilkesboro Speedway	30 March 1952	
10	Herb Thomas	1952-08	No name	Central City Speedway	27 April 1952	
11	Herb Thomas	1952-12	1952 Poor Man's 500	Canfield Speedway	30 May 1952	
11	Tim Flock	1952-15	No name	Occoneechee Speedway	8 June 1952	
12	Herb Thomas	1952-16	No name	Charlotte Speedway	15 June 1952	
12	Tim Flock	1952-17	1952 Motor City 250	Michigan State Fairgrounds	29 June 1952	
13	Tim Flock	1952-19	No name	Wine Creek Race Track	4 July 1952	
14	Tim Flock	1952-20	No name	Monroe Speedway	6 July 1952	
15	Tim Flock	1952-22	No name	Playland Park Speedway	20 July 1952	
16	Tim Flock	1952-23	No name	Monroe County Fairgrounds	15 August 1952	
16	Herb Thomas	1952-34	No name	Palm Beach Speedway	30 November 1952	
17	Herb Thomas	1953-03	No name	Harnett Speedway	8 March 1953	
...	...	...	...	...	...	...
48	Herb Thomas	1956-24	No name	Merced Fairgrounds	3 June 1956	
48	Lee Petty	1959-43	1959 Wilkes 160	North Wilkesboro Speedway	18 October 1959	
49	Lee Petty	1960-07	1960 Gwyn Staley 160	North Wilkesboro Speedway	27 March 1960	
...	...	...	...	...	...	...
54	Lee Petty	1961-02	No name	Speedway Park	20 November 1960	
54	Richard Petty	1967-16	1967 Richmond 250	Virginia State Fairgrounds	30 April 1967	
55	Richard Petty	1967-17	1967 Rebel 400	Darlington Raceway	13 May 1967	
...	...	...	...	...	...	...
200	Richard Petty	1984-16	1984 Firecracker 400	Daytona International Speedway	4 July 1984	

== Most wins at different tracks ==
=== Current tracks and drivers ===
The following table provides a comparison of which drivers have achieved at least one race win on certain racetracks. Only drivers who have won at ten or more different racetracks are listed. Wins in bonus races without scoring for the championship are marked with NC, but are not counted in the tally.

Driver	Numbers	ATL	BRI	CHI	CLT	CTA	COR	DAR	DAY	GAT	HOM	IND	IOW	KAN	LVS	MAR	MCH	NHA	NSH	NWS	PHO	POC	RIC	SON	TAL	TEX	WGL	BGS	DOV
Denny Hamlin	21 of 26	X	X	X	X	-	-	X	X	X	X	-	-	X	X	X	X	X	X	-	XX	X	X	-	X	X	X	-	X
Joey Logano	20 of 26	X	XX	-	X	-	-	X	X	X	X	-	-	X	X	X	X	X	X	X	XX	X	X	-	X	X	X	-	-
Kyle Larson	18 of 26	-	X	-	X	-	-	X	-	X	X	X	-	X	X	X	X	-	X	NC	X	-	X	X	X	X	X	-	X
Brad Keselowski	15 of 26	X	X	X	X	-	-	X	X	-	-	X	-	X	X	X	-	X	-	-	-	X	X	-	X	-	-	-	X
Ryan Blaney	12 of 26	X	-	-	X	-	-	-	X	-	X	-	X	-	-	X	X	X	X	-	X	X	-	-	X	NC	-	-	-
Chase Elliott	12 of 26	X	NC	-	X	X	-	-	-	-	-	-	-	X	-	X	-	-	X	-	X	X	-	-	X	X	X	NC	X
William Byron	11 of 26	X	-	-	-	X	-	X	X	-	X	-	X	-	X	X	-	-	-	-	X	-	-	-	-	X	X	-	-
Tyler Reddick	10 of 26	X	-	-	-	X	-	X	X	-	X	-	-	X	-	-	X	-	-	-	X	-	-	-	X	X	-	-	-
Christopher Bell	9 of 26	X	XX	-	X	X	-	X	-	-	X	-	-	-	-	X	-	X	-	NC	X	-	-	-	-	-	-	-	-

Note:

- X - at least one win in a points race
- NC - at least one win in a non-points race
- - - participation, but no win
- no entry = no participation

=== Historical ===
Here is a list of the drivers who have the most wins on different racetracks in a certain category. Wins in bonus races without scoring for the championship are marked with NC, but not counting to total numbers.

==== Short tracks (1949–1971) ====
===== Dirt tracks =====
Driver	Numbers	AIR	AWS	AUG	CCS	COL	CON	FCF	COR	GPS	GRS	HEI	HIC	HUB	JAC	LAK	LHS	LNG	LNC	LOU	MAR	MNR	MOR	MYR	NSF	OCC	PPS	RIC	SAL	SAV	SHA	SMR	SSF	TRI	V75	WIL
Lee Petty	27 of 32	X	X	-	X	X	X	X	X	-	X	X	X	X	X	X	X		X	X	X	X	X	-	-	X	X	X	X	-	X		X	X		X
Richard Petty	13 of 21			X		X	X			X		-	X	X	-	-		X	-			-		-	X	X		X		X		X	X		-	-
David Pearson	10 of 17			X		X	-			X			X	-	-			-	X					X	X	X		X		-		X	-		-	

===== Paved tracks =====
Driver	Numbers	ASS	AWS	BEL	BIR	BGS	BOY	BMS	CAN	DTS	FOS	GGS	GPS	GRE	HAR	HIC	HUN	ISL	KPT	LNG	MGR	MAR	MEY	MON	NAH	NAS	NWS	OBS	ODS	OPS	RIC	SAV	SMR	SBS	STK	TAR	THO	WVS
Richard Petty	29 of 39	X	X	X	X	X	-	X	-	-	X	X	X	-	X	X	X	X	X	-	X	X	-	X	X	X	X	-	X	X	X	X	X	X	X	X	-	X
David Pearson	16 of 36	-	X	X	-	X	X	X		X	X	-	-	-	-	X	-	-	-	X	X	X	-	-	X	X	X	-	-	-	X	-	-	-	-	-	X	-
Bobby Allison	15 of 36	-	X	X	X	X	-	X		-	-	-	-	-	-	-	-	X	-	X	X	X	X	X	-	X	X		-	X	X	-	-	-	-	-	-	-
Lee Petty	6 of 9		X			X		-	X													X				-	X	X			-							

==== Short tracks (modern era, 1972–present) ====
Key
Track is part of 2026 season

Driver	Numbers	BMS (paved)	BMS (dirt)	IOW	MAR	NAS	NWS	RIC (old layout)	RIC (new layout)
Dale Earnhardt	6 of 6	X			X	X	X	X	X
Joey Logano	5 of 6	X	X	-	X		X		X
Darrell Waltrip	5 of 6	X			X	X	X	X	-
Jeff Gordon	4 of 4	X			X		X		X
Mark Martin	4 of 5	X			X		X	-	X
Kyle Busch	4 of 5	X	X	-	X				X
Rusty Wallace	4 of 6	X			X		X	-	X
Kevin Harvick	3 of 3	X			X				X
Tony Stewart	3 of 3	X			X				X
Dale Jarrett	3 of 4	X			X		-		X
Denny Hamlin	3 of 6	X	-	-	X		-		X
Brad Keselowski	3 of 6	X	-	-	X		-		X
Christopher Bell	3 of 6	X	X	-	X		-		-
Carl Edwards	2 of 3	X			-				X
Kasey Kahne	2 of 3	X			-				X
Matt Kenseth	2 of 3	X			-				X

==== Intermediates and mile ovals ====
Driver	Numbers	AMS (old layout)	AMS (new layout)	CHA	CHI	DAR	DOV	GAT	HOM	KAN	KTY	LVS	NSS	NCS	NHS	PHO	TMS	TRE
Kyle Busch	14 of 15		X	X	X	X	X	X	X	X	X	X	-		X	XX	X	
Denny Hamlin	14 of 15		X	X	X	X	X	X	X	X	-	X	X		X	XX	X	
Jeff Gordon	13 of 14	X	X	X	X	X	X		X	X	-	X		X	X	X	X	
Kevin Harvick	11 of 15		X	X	X	X	X	-	X	X	-	X	-	-	X	X	X	
Joey Logano	11 of 15		X	X	-	X	-	X	X	X	-	X	-		X	XX	X	
Mark Martin	11 of 13	X	-	X	X	X	X		-	X	-	X		X	X	X	X	
Tony Stewart	11 of 13		X	X	X	-	X		X	X	-	X		X	X	X	X	
Jimmie Johnson	10 of 13		X	X	-	X	X		X	X	-	X		-	X	X	X	
Martin Truex Jr.	10 of 14		-	X	X	X	X	-	X	X	X	X	-		X	X	-	
Kurt Busch	10 of 15		X	X	-	-	X	-	X	X	X	X	-	-	X	X	X	
Brad Keselowski	9 of 14		X	X	X	X	X	-	-	X	X	X	-		X	-	-	
Kyle Larson	9 of 14		-	X	-	X	X	-	X	X	-	X	X		-	X	X	
Dale Earnhardt	8 of 11	X	X	X		X	X		-			-		X	X	X	-	
Dale Jarrett	8 of 12	X	-	X	-	X	X		-	-		-		X	X	X	X	
Bill Elliott	7 of 12	X	-	X	-	X	X		X	-		-		X	-	X	-	
Bobby Allison	6 of 6	X		X		X	X							X				X
David Pearson	6 of 6	X		X		X	X							X				X
Richard Petty	6 of 7	X		X		X	X							X		-		X
Cale Yarborough	5 of 6	X		X		X	X							X				-
Darrell Waltrip	5 of 8	X	-	X		X	X							X	-	-	-	

==== Superspeedways and 2-mile ovals ====
Driver	Numbers	CAL	DAY	IMS	MIS	OMS	POC	TAL	TWS
Kyle Busch	6 of 6	X	X	X	X		X	X	
Jeff Gordon	6 of 6	X	X	X	X		X	X	
Kevin Harvick	6 of 6	X	X	X	X		X	X	
Jimmie Johnson	6 of 6	X	X	X	X		X	X	
Tony Stewart	6 of 6	X	X	X	X		X	X	
Bobby Allison	5 of 6		X		X	X	X	X	-
Bill Elliott	5 of 6	-	X	X	X		X	X	
Dale Jarrett	5 of 6	-	X	X	X		X	X	
Brad Keselowski	5 of 6	X	X	X	-		X	X	
David Pearson	5 of 6		X		X	X	X	X	-
Richard Petty	5 of 6		X		X	-	X	X	X
Cale Yarborough	5 of 6		X		X	-	X	X	X
Dale Earnhardt	5 of 7	-	X	X	X		X	X	-
Kyle Larson	4 of 6	X	-	X	X		-	X	
Ryan Blaney	4 of 6	-	X	-	X		X	X	
Denny Hamlin	4 of 6	-	X	-	X		X	X	
Joey Logano	4 of 6	-	X	-	X		X	X	
Darrell Waltrip	4 of 8	-	X	-	X	-	X	X	-
Mark Martin	3 of 6	X	NC	-	X		-	X	
Tyler Reddick	3 of 6	-	X	-	X		-	X	
Rusty Wallace	3 of 6	X	NC	-	X		X	-	
Corey Heim	1 of 2		-	X					

==== Road courses and temporary street circuits ====
Driver	Numbers	BRR	CHA (Roval)	COR	CSC	CTA	DAY (Road)	IMS (Road)	MXC	RIV	ROA	SNM	WGL
Shane van Gisbergen	5 of 8		X	-	X	-		-	X			X	X
Chase Elliott	5 of 10		X	-	-	X	X	-	-		X	-	X
Geoff Bodine	3 of 3									X		X	X
Ricky Rudd	3 of 3									X		X	X
Rusty Wallace	3 of 3									X		X	X
Jeff Gordon	2 of 2											X	X
Robby Gordon	2 of 2											X	X
Juan Pablo Montoya	2 of 2											X	X
David Pearson	2 of 2	X								X			
Tim Richmond	2 of 2									X			X
Tony Stewart	2 of 2											X	X
Ernie Irvan	2 of 3									-		X	X
Mark Martin	2 of 3									-		X	X
Billy Wade	2 of 3	X								-			X
Richard Petty	2 of 4	X								X		-	-
Corey Heim	1 of 1			X									

== Most wins at each track ==
This section shows most winners per track.

=== Current driver wins on current tracks ===
Track	Active drivers	Wins
Atlanta Motor Speedway	Ryan Blaney, William Byron, Chase Elliott, Brad Keselowski, and Joey Logano	2
Bristol Motor Speedway	Denny Hamlin	4
Charlotte Motor Speedway	Brad Keselowski	2
Chicagoland Speedway	Brad Keselowski	2
Circuit of the Americas	Tyler Reddick	2
Coronado Street Course	Corey Heim	1
Darlington Raceway	Denny Hamlin	5
Daytona International Speedway	Denny Hamlin and William Byron	3
Homestead-Miami Speedway	Denny Hamlin	3
Indianapolis Motor Speedway	Corey Heim, Brad Keselowski, Kyle Larson, and Bubba Wallace	1
Iowa Speedway	Ryan Blaney, William Byron, and Ty Gibbs	1
Kansas Speedway	Denny Hamlin and Kyle Larson	4
Las Vegas Motor Speedway	Joey Logano	4
Martinsville Speedway	Denny Hamlin	6
Michigan International Speedway	Denny Hamlin	4
Nashville Superspeedway	Ryan Blaney, Ross Chastain, Chase Elliott, Denny Hamlin, Kyle Larson, and Joey Logano	1
New Hampshire Motor Speedway	Denny Hamlin	3
North Wilkesboro Speedway	Joey Logano	1
Phoenix Raceway	Joey Logano	4
Pocono Raceway	Denny Hamlin	8
Richmond Raceway	Denny Hamlin	5
Sonoma Raceway	Kyle Larson and Shane van Gisbergen	2
Talladega Superspeedway	Brad Keselowski	6
Texas Motor Speedway	Denny Hamlin	3
Watkins Glen International	Chase Elliott, Kyle Larson, and Shane van Gisbergen	2
World Wide Technology Raceway	Austin Cindric, Denny Hamlin, Kyle Larson, and Joey Logano	1

=== All-time Winners ===
==== Short Tracks ====
Track	Driver	Wins
Albany-Saratoga Speedway	Richard Petty	2
Asheville-Weaverville Speedway	Rex White	5
Augusta Speedway	Joe Weatherly, Richard Petty, Bobby Isaac, and David Pearson	2
Beltsville Speedway	Bobby Isaac	3
Birmingham International Raceway	Ned Jarrett	3
Bowman Gray Stadium	Rex White	6
Bristol Motor Speedway	Darrell Waltrip	12
Bristol Motor Speedway (Dirt)	Joey Logano, Kyle Busch, and Christopher Bell	1
California State Fairgrounds	Eddie Gray	2
Central City Speedway	Herb Thomas	2
Champion Speedway	Bob Welborn	2
Charlotte Speedway	Buck Baker	3
Cleveland County Fairgrounds	Buck Baker and Ned Jarrett	2
Columbia Speedway	Richard Petty	7
Concord Speedway	Jack Smith	3
Dayton Speedway	Dick Rathman	2
Dog Track Speedway	Ned Jarrett	4
Fonda Speedway	Richard Petty	2
Fort Miami Speedway	Tim Flock	2
Greenville-Pickens Speedway	Richard Petty	6
Heidelberg Raceway	Lee Petty	2
Hickory Motor Speedway	Junior Johnson	7
Iowa Speedway	Ryan Blaney, William Byron, and Ty Gibbs	1
Islip Speedway	Richard Petty and Bobby Allison	2
Jacksonville Speedway Park	Herb Thomas and Lee Petty	2
Kingsport Speedway	Richard Petty	2
Lakewood Speedway	Herb Thomas and Buck Baker	2
Langley Speedway	David Pearson	3
Lincoln Speedway	Buck Baker	2
Martinsville Speedway	Richard Petty	15
Middle Georgia Raceway	Richard Petty	4
Monroe County Fairgrounds	Tim Flock and Lee Petty	2
Montgomery Speedway	Tim Flock	2
Morristown Speedway	Tim Flock	2
Myrtle Beach Speedway	Ned Jarrett	3
Nashville Speedway	Richard Petty	9
New Asheville Speedway	Ned Jarrett and Richard Petty	2
Newport Speedway	Fireball Roberts	2
North Wilkesboro Speedway	Richard Petty	15
Occoneechee Speedway	Buck Baker, Lee Petty, and Richard Petty	3
Old Dominion Speedway	Ned Jarrett & Richard Petty	2
Oxford Plains Speedway	Bobby Allison	2
Palm Beach Speedway	Herb Thomas	4
Piedmont Interstate Fairgrounds	Ned Jarrett	6
Portland Speedway	Eddie Pagan	2
Reading Fairgrounds Speedway	Junior Johnson	2
Richmond Raceway	Richard Petty	13
Savannah Speedway	Richard Petty	3
Smoky Mountain Raceway	Richard Petty	6
South Boston Speedway	Richard Petty	5
Southern States Fairgrounds	Lee Petty	3
Starkey Speedway	Junior Johnson	2
Tar Heel Speedway	Jim Paschal	2
West Virginia International Speedway	Richard Petty	3
Wilson Speedway	Herb Thomas	3

==== Intermediates ====
Track	Driver	Wins
Arizona State Fairgrounds (dirt)	Marshall Teague, Tim Flock, Buck Baker, and John Rostek	1
Atlanta Motor Speedway	Dale Earnhardt	9
Bay Meadows Racetrack (dirt)	Hershel McGriff, Tim Flock, and Eddie Pagan	1
California State Fairgrounds (dirt)	Eddie Gray	2
Charlotte Motor Speedway	Jimmie Johnson	8
Chicagoland Speedway	Tony Stewart	3
Darlington Raceway	David Pearson	10
Dover International Speedway	Jimmie Johnson	11
Homestead-Miami Speedway	Greg Biffle, Denny Hamlin, and Tony Stewart	3
Kansas Speedway	Denny Hamlin	4
Kentucky Speedway	Brad Keselowski	3
Lakewood Speedway (dirt)	Herb Thomas and Buck Baker	2
Langhorne Speedway (dirt)	Dick Rathmann and Herb Thomas	3
Las Vegas Motor Speedway	Jimmie Johnson and Joey Logano	4
Marchbanks Speedway	Marvin Porter and Fireball Roberts	1
Memphis-Arkansas Speedway (dirt)	Buck Baker and Fonty Flock	1
Michigan State Fairgrounds Speedway (dirt)	Tommy Thompson and Tim Flock	1
Nashville Superspeedway	Ryan Blaney, Ross Chastain, Chase Elliott, Kyle Larson, Joey Logano, and Denny Hamlin	1
New Hampshire Motor Speedway	Jeff Burton and Kevin Harvick	4
New York State Fairgrounds (dirt)	Tim Flock, Buck Baker, and Gwyn Staley	1
Phoenix Raceway	Kevin Harvick	9
Raleigh Speedway	Fonty Flock, Fireball Roberts, and Herb Thomas	2
Rockingham Speedway	Richard Petty	11
Texas Motor Speedway	Jimmie Johnson	7
Trenton Speedway	Richard Petty	3
World Wide Technology Raceway	Kyle Busch, Austin Cindric, Joey Logano, and Denny Hamlin	1

==== Superspeedways ====
Track	Driver	Wins
Auto Club Speedway	Jimmie Johnson	6
Daytona International Speedway	Richard Petty	10
Indianapolis Motor Speedway	Jeff Gordon	5
Michigan International Speedway	David Pearson	9
Ontario Motor Speedway	A. J. Foyt, Bobby Allison, and Benny Parsons	2
Pocono Raceway	Denny Hamlin	8
Talladega Superspeedway	Dale Earnhardt	10
Texas World Speedway	Richard Petty	3

==== Road Courses and Street Circuits ====
Track	Driver	Wins
Charlotte Motor Speedway Roval	Chase Elliott and Kyle Larson	2
Chicago Street Course	Shane van Gisbergen	2
Circuit of the Americas	Tyler Reddick	2
Daytona International Speedway Road course	Chase Elliott and Christopher Bell	1
Daytona Beach and Road Course	Marshall Teague and Tim Flock	2
Indianapolis Motor Speedway Road Course	A.J. Allmendinger, Michael McDowell, and Tyler Reddick	1
Riverside International Raceway	Bobby Allison	6
Road America	Tim Flock, Chase Elliott, and Tyler Reddick	1
Sonoma Raceway	Jeff Gordon	5
Watkins Glen International	Tony Stewart	5

=== Winners on tracks used only one time ===
List of winners on tracks, that were used only one-time in Cup NASCAR history.

Track	Winner	Year
Air Base Speedway	Bob Flock	1951
Airborne Speedway	Lee Petty	1955
Augusta International Raceway (road course)	Fireball Roberts	1963
Autódromo Hermanos Rodríguez	Shane van Gisbergen	2025
Bainbridge Speedway	Fonty Flock	1951
Bloomsburg Fairgrounds	Herb Thomas	1953
Canadian Exposition Stadium	Lee Petty	1958
Capital Speedway	Bill Amick	1957
Chisholm Speedway	Buck Baker	1956
Coronado Street Course	Corey Heim	2026
Civic Stadium	Jim Reed	1958
Columbus Speedway	Tim Flock	1951
Corbin Speedway	Lee Petty	1954
Davenport Speedway	Herb Thomas	1953
Dixie Speedway	Ned Jarrett	1960
Five Flags Speedway	Herb Thomas	1953
Gamecock Speedway	Ned Jarrett	1960
Gastonia Fairgrounds	Buck Baker	1958
Golden Gate Speedway	Richard Petty	1962
Hanford Motor Speedway (1/2 mi oval)	Danny Weinberg	1951
Harnett Speedway	Herb Thomas	1953
Hartsville Speedway	Buck Baker	1961
Huntsville Speedway	Richard Petty	1962
Kitsap County Airport	Parnelli Jones	1957
Las Vegas Park Speedway	Norm Nelson	1955
Lincoln City Fairgrounds	Dick Rathman	1953
Linden Airport	Al Keller	1954
Louisiana Fairgrounds	Lee Petty	1953
McCormick Field	Jim Pascal	1958
Merced Fairgrounds	Herb Thomas	1956
Meyer Speedway	Bobby Allison	1971
Montgomery Airbase	Rex White	1960
Monroe Speedway	Tim Flock	1952
Newberry Speedway	Fireball Roberts	1957
New Bradford Speedway	Junior Johnson	1958
Norwood Arena	Emanuel Zervakis	1961
Oklahoma State Fairgrounds	Jim Pascal	1956
Pine Grove Speedway	Tim Flock	1951
Playland Park Speedway	Tim Flock	1952
Powell Motor Speedway	Herb Thomas	1953
Princess Anne Speedway	Herb Thomas	1953
Rapid Valley Speedway	Herb Thomas	1953
Santa Clara Fairgrounds	Marvin Porter	1957
Santa Fe Speedway	Dick Rathman	1954
Salisbury Speedway	Lee Petty	1958
Shangri-La Motor Speedway	Tim Flock	1952
Sharon Speedway	Lee Petty	1954
Soldier Field	Fireball Roberts	1956
Stamford Park	Buddy Shuman	1952
Starlite Speedway	Darel Dieringer	1966
State Line Speedway	Shorty Rollins	1958
Titusville-Cocoa Speedway	Fireball Roberts	1956
Tucson Rodeo Grounds	Danny Letner	1955
Wall Stadium	Jim Reed	1958
Williams Groove Speedway	Herb Thomas	1954
Winchester Speedway	Lloyd Moore	1950

== See also ==
- List of NASCAR Cup Series champions
- List of NASCAR tracks
