= 1996 Goodwrench Service 400 =

Second race of the 1996 NASCAR Winston Cup Series

Race details
- Race 2 of 31 in the 1996 NASCAR Winston Cup Series
- The 1996 Goodwrench Service 400 program cover, featuring Dale Earnhardt.
- Date: February 25, 1996
- Official name: 31st Annual Goodwrench Service 400
- Location: Rockingham, North Carolina, North Carolina Speedway
- Course: Permanent racing facility
- Course length: 1.017 miles (1.637 km)
- Distance: 393 laps, 399.681 mi (643.224 km)
- Scheduled distance: 393 laps, 399.681 mi (643.224 km)
- Average speed: 113.959 miles per hour (183.399 km/h)

Pole position
Driver	Terry Labonte	Hendrick Motorsports
- Time: 23.339

Most laps led
Driver	Terry Labonte	Hendrick Motorsports
- Laps: 198

Winner
No. 3	Dale Earnhardt	Richard Childress Racing

Television in the United States
- Network: TNN
- Announcers: Eli Gold, Buddy Baker, Dick Berggren

Radio in the United States
- Radio: Motor Racing Network

The 1996 Goodwrench Service 400 was the second stock car race of the 1996 NASCAR Winston Cup Series and the 31st iteration of the event. The race was held on Sunday, February 25, 1996, in Rockingham, North Carolina, at North Carolina Speedway, a 1.017 miles (1.637 km) permanent high-banked racetrack. The race took the scheduled 393 laps to complete. In a controversial and wreck-filled race, Richard Childress Racing driver Dale Earnhardt would manage to pass for the lead with 15 to go to take his 69th career NASCAR Winston Cup Series victory and his first victory of the season. To fill out the top three, Robert Yates Racing driver Dale Jarrett and Larry Hedrick Motorsports driver Ricky Craven would finish second and third, respectively.

The race was marred by a crash with TriStar Motorsports driver Loy Allen Jr. on lap 179. Allen's car would blow a right front tire, sending Allen's car into the turn two wall. The car then ricocheted into the inside retaining wall before coming to a stop. Allen was initially unconscious when checked by paramedics, and was placed on a stretcher before regaining consciousness in the ambulance. Allen was eventually diagnosed with a slight head injury and an injured shoulder blade.

== Background ==
The layout of North Carolina Speedway, the venue where the race was held.

North Carolina Speedway was opened as a flat, one-mile oval on October 31, 1965. In 1969, the track was extensively reconfigured to a high-banked, D-shaped oval just over one mile in length. In 1997, North Carolina Motor Speedway merged with Penske Motorsports, and was renamed North Carolina Speedway. Shortly thereafter, the infield was reconfigured, and competition on the infield road course, mostly by the SCCA, was discontinued. Currently, the track is home to the Fast Track High Performance Driving School.

=== Entry list ===
- (R) denotes rookie driver.

#	Driver	Team	Make
1	Rick Mast	Precision Products Racing	Pontiac
2	Rusty Wallace	Penske Racing South	Ford
3	Dale Earnhardt	Richard Childress Racing	Chevrolet
4	Sterling Marlin	Morgan–McClure Motorsports	Chevrolet
5	Terry Labonte	Hendrick Motorsports	Chevrolet
6	Mark Martin	Roush Racing	Ford
7	Geoff Bodine	Geoff Bodine Racing	Ford
8	Hut Stricklin	Stavola Brothers Racing	Ford
9	Lake Speed	Melling Racing	Ford
10	Ricky Rudd	Rudd Performance Motorsports	Ford
11	Brett Bodine	Brett Bodine Racing	Ford
12	Derrike Cope	Bobby Allison Motorsports	Ford
15	Wally Dallenbach Jr.	Bud Moore Engineering	Ford
16	Ted Musgrave	Roush Racing	Ford
17	Darrell Waltrip	Darrell Waltrip Motorsports	Chevrolet
18	Bobby Labonte	Joe Gibbs Racing	Chevrolet
19	Loy Allen Jr.	TriStar Motorsports	Ford
21	Michael Waltrip	Wood Brothers Racing	Ford
22	Ward Burton	Bill Davis Racing	Pontiac
23	Jimmy Spencer	Haas-Carter Motorsports	Ford
24	Jeff Gordon	Hendrick Motorsports	Chevrolet
25	Ken Schrader	Hendrick Motorsports	Chevrolet
27	Elton Sawyer	David Blair Motorsports	Ford
28	Ernie Irvan	Robert Yates Racing	Ford
29	Steve Grissom	Diamond Ridge Motorsports	Chevrolet
30	Johnny Benson Jr. (R)	Bahari Racing	Pontiac
31	Mike Skinner	Richard Childress Racing	Chevrolet
33	Robert Pressley	Leo Jackson Motorsports	Chevrolet
37	Jeremy Mayfield	Kranefuss-Haas Racing	Ford
41	Ricky Craven	Larry Hedrick Motorsports	Chevrolet
42	Kyle Petty	Team SABCO	Pontiac
43	Bobby Hamilton	Petty Enterprises	Pontiac
63	Dick Trickle	Schnell Motorsports	Ford
71	Dave Marcis	Marcis Auto Racing	Chevrolet
75	Morgan Shepherd	Butch Mock Motorsports	Ford
77	Bobby Hillin Jr.	Jasper Motorsports	Ford
78	Randy MacDonald	Triad Motorsports	Ford
81	Kenny Wallace	FILMAR Racing	Ford
87	Joe Nemechek	NEMCO Motorsports	Chevrolet
88	Dale Jarrett	Robert Yates Racing	Ford
90	Mike Wallace	Donlavey Racing	Ford
93	Gary Bradberry	Bradberry Racing	Chevrolet
94	Bill Elliott	Bill Elliott Racing	Ford
98	Jeremy Mayfield	Cale Yarborough Motorsports	Ford
99	Jeff Burton	Roush Racing	Ford

== Qualifying ==
Qualifying was split into two rounds. The first round was held on Friday, February 23, at 1:00 PM EST. Each driver would have one lap to set a time. During the first round, the top 25 drivers in the round would be guaranteed a starting spot in the race. If a driver was not able to guarantee a spot in the first round, they had the option to scrub their time from the first round and try and run a faster lap time in a second round qualifying run, held on Saturday, February 24, at 11:30 AM EST. As with the first round, each driver would have one lap to set a time. For this specific race, positions 26-38 would be decided on time, and depending on who needed it, a select amount of positions were given to cars who had not otherwise qualified but were high enough in owner's points.

Terry Labonte, driving for Hendrick Motorsports, would win the pole, setting a time of 23.339 and an average speed of 156.870 miles per hour (252.458 km/h).

Four drivers would fail to qualify: Elton Sawyer, Randy MacDonald, Gary Bradberry, and Dick Trickle.

=== Full qualifying results ===
Pos.	#	Driver	Team	Make	Time	Speed
1	5	Terry Labonte	Hendrick Motorsports	Chevrolet	23.339	156.870
2	24	Jeff Gordon	Hendrick Motorsports	Chevrolet	23.356	156.756
3	30	Johnny Benson Jr. (R)	Bahari Racing	Pontiac	23.415	156.361
4	8	Hut Stricklin	Stavola Brothers Racing	Ford	23.444	156.168
5	18	Bobby Labonte	Joe Gibbs Racing	Chevrolet	23.547	156.081
6	29	Steve Grissom	Diamond Ridge Motorsports	Chevrolet	23.517	155.683
7	37	John Andretti	Kranefuss-Haas Racing	Ford	23.525	155.630
8	81	Kenny Wallace	FILMAR Racing	Ford	23.528	155.610
9	42	Kyle Petty	Team SABCO	Pontiac	23.534	155.571
10	43	Bobby Hamilton	Petty Enterprises	Pontiac	23.558	155.412
11	22	Ward Burton	Bill Davis Racing	Pontiac	23.581	155.261
12	98	Jeremy Mayfield	Cale Yarborough Motorsports	Ford	23.583	155.247
13	88	Dale Jarrett	Robert Yates Racing	Ford	23.596	155.162
14	17	Darrell Waltrip	Darrell Waltrip Motorsports	Chevrolet	23.620	155.004
15	94	Bill Elliott	Bill Elliott Racing	Ford	23.622	154.991
16	87	Joe Nemechek	NEMCO Motorsports	Chevrolet	23.637	154.893
17	11	Brett Bodine	Brett Bodine Racing	Ford	23.640	154.873
18	3	Dale Earnhardt	Richard Childress Racing	Chevrolet	23.641	154.867
19	33	Robert Pressley	Leo Jackson Motorsports	Chevrolet	23.644	154.847
20	25	Ken Schrader	Hendrick Motorsports	Chevrolet	23.653	154.788
21	2	Rusty Wallace	Penske Racing	Ford	23.654	154.781
22	6	Mark Martin	Roush Racing	Ford	23.676	154.638
23	99	Jeff Burton	Roush Racing	Ford	23.679	154.618
24	1	Rick Mast	Precision Products Racing	Pontiac	23.686	154.572
25	10	Ricky Rudd	Rudd Performance Motorsports	Ford	23.687	154.566
26	21	Michael Waltrip	Wood Brothers Racing	Ford	23.687	154.533
27	16	Ted Musgrave	Roush Racing	Ford	23.701	154.474
28	23	Jimmy Spencer	Travis Carter Enterprises	Ford	23.707	154.435
29	12	Derrike Cope	Bobby Allison Motorsports	Ford	23.734	154.260
30	41	Ricky Craven	Larry Hedrick Motorsports	Chevrolet	23.872	154.195
31	4	Sterling Marlin	Morgan–McClure Motorsports	Chevrolet	23.758	154.104
32	90	Mike Wallace	Donlavey Racing	Ford	23.770	154.026
33	7	Geoff Bodine	Geoff Bodine Racing	Ford	23.772	154.013
34	28	Ernie Irvan	Robert Yates Racing	Ford	23.781	153.955
35	31	Mike Skinner	Richard Childress Racing	Chevrolet	23.796	153.858
36	75	Morgan Shepherd	Butch Mock Motorsports	Ford	23.811	153.765
37	15	Wally Dallenbach Jr.	Bud Moore Engineering	Ford	23.872	153.368
38	9	Lake Speed	Melling Racing	Ford	23.949	152.875
Provisionals
39	77	Bobby Hillin Jr.	Jasper Motorsports	Ford	23.993	152.595
40	71	Dave Marcis	Marcis Auto Racing	Chevrolet	23.953	152.849
41	19	Loy Allen Jr.	TriStar Motorsports	Ford	23.991	152.607
Failed to qualify
42	27	Elton Sawyer	David Blair Motorsports	Ford	-*	-*
43	78	Randy MacDonald	Triad Motorsports	Ford	-*	-*
44	93	Gary Bradberry	Bradberry Racing	Chevrolet	-*	-*
45	63	Dick Trickle	Schnell Motorsports	Ford	-*	-*
Official qualifying results

*Time not available.

== Race results ==
Fin	St	#	Driver	Team	Make	Laps	Led	Status	Pts	Winnings
1	18	3	Dale Earnhardt	Richard Childress Racing	Chevrolet	393	95	running	180	$83,840
2	13	88	Dale Jarrett	Robert Yates Racing	Ford	393	8	running	175	$48,960
3	30	41	Ricky Craven	Larry Hedrick Motorsports	Chevrolet	393	0	running	165	$47,760
4	25	10	Ricky Rudd	Rudd Performance Motorsports	Ford	393	3	running	165	$35,810
5	6	29	Steve Grissom	Diamond Ridge Motorsports	Chevrolet	393	0	running	155	$31,475
6	31	4	Sterling Marlin	Morgan–McClure Motorsports	Chevrolet	393	0	running	150	$34,425
7	8	81	Kenny Wallace	FILMAR Racing	Ford	393	0	running	146	$14,425
8	29	12	Derrike Cope	Bobby Allison Motorsports	Ford	392	0	running	142	$25,525
9	16	87	Joe Nemechek	NEMCO Motorsports	Chevrolet	392	0	running	138	$25,225
10	24	1	Rick Mast	Precision Products Racing	Pontiac	391	0	running	134	$27,525
11	9	42	Kyle Petty	Team SABCO	Pontiac	391	0	running	130	$24,325
12	35	31	Mike Skinner	Richard Childress Racing	Chevrolet	391	0	running	127	$12,825
13	23	99	Jeff Burton	Roush Racing	Ford	391	0	running	124	$12,625
14	34	28	Ernie Irvan	Robert Yates Racing	Ford	390	0	running	121	$27,425
15	15	94	Bill Elliott	Bill Elliott Racing	Ford	390	0	running	118	$25,325
16	14	17	Darrell Waltrip	Darrell Waltrip Motorsports	Chevrolet	390	0	running	115	$23,015
17	32	90	Mike Wallace	Donlavey Racing	Ford	389	0	running	112	$15,625
18	39	77	Bobby Hillin Jr.	Jasper Motorsports	Ford	389	0	crash	109	$15,325
19	12	98	Jeremy Mayfield	Cale Yarborough Motorsports	Ford	388	0	running	106	$14,975
20	3	30	Johnny Benson Jr. (R)	Bahari Racing	Pontiac	386	0	running	103	$24,625
21	40	71	Dave Marcis	Marcis Auto Racing	Chevrolet	386	0	running	100	$14,350
22	21	2	Rusty Wallace	Penske Racing	Ford	384	0	running	97	$25,850
23	37	15	Wally Dallenbach Jr.	Bud Moore Engineering	Ford	383	0	crash	94	$21,000
24	10	43	Bobby Hamilton	Petty Enterprises	Pontiac	383	36	running	96	$27,300
25	38	9	Lake Speed	Melling Racing	Ford	370	0	engine	88	$20,800
26	19	33	Robert Pressley	Leo Jackson Motorsports	Chevrolet	351	0	running	85	$20,390
27	28	23	Jimmy Spencer	Travis Carter Enterprises	Ford	328	53	engine	87	$20,290
28	17	11	Brett Bodine	Brett Bodine Racing	Ford	311	0	running	79	$19,740
29	20	25	Ken Schrader	Hendrick Motorsports	Chevrolet	302	0	running	76	$17,065
30	4	8	Hut Stricklin	Stavola Brothers Racing	Ford	287	0	running	73	$10,015
31	27	16	Ted Musgrave	Roush Racing	Ford	263	0	crash	70	$16,815
32	22	6	Mark Martin	Roush Racing	Ford	247	0	camshaft	67	$26,565
33	5	18	Bobby Labonte	Joe Gibbs Racing	Chevrolet	240	0	running	64	$25,615
34	1	5	Terry Labonte	Hendrick Motorsports	Chevrolet	235	198	engine	71	$41,465
35	26	21	Michael Waltrip	Wood Brothers Racing	Ford	232	0	oil pump	58	$16,465
36	41	19	Loy Allen Jr.	TriStar Motorsports	Ford	167	0	crash	55	$9,390
37	36	75	Morgan Shepherd	Butch Mock Motorsports	Ford	161	0	engine	52	$9,350
38	7	37	John Andretti	Kranefuss-Haas Racing	Ford	159	0	engine	49	$16,280
39	33	7	Geoff Bodine	Geoff Bodine Racing	Ford	141	0	engine	46	$16,280
40	2	24	Jeff Gordon	Hendrick Motorsports	Chevrolet	134	0	engine	43	$31,730
41	11	22	Ward Burton	Bill Davis Racing	Pontiac	95	0	crash	40	$24,280
Failed to qualify
42		27	Elton Sawyer	David Blair Motorsports	Ford					
43		78	Randy MacDonald	Triad Motorsports	Ford					
44		93	Gary Bradberry	Bradberry Racing	Chevrolet					
45		63	Dick Trickle	Schnell Motorsports	Ford					
Official race results

Previous race: 1996 Daytona 500	NASCAR Winston Cup Series; 1996 season	Next race: 1996 Pontiac Excitement 400
