= 2005 MBNA RacePoints 400 =

Race details
- Race 13 of 36 in the 2005 NASCAR Nextel Cup Series
- The 2005 MBNA RacePoints 400 program cover, featuring Mark Martin.
- Date: June 5, 2005
- Official name: 37th Annual MBNA RacePoints 400
- Location: Dover, Delaware, Dover International Speedway
- Course: Permanent racing facility
- Course length: 1.6 km (1 miles)
- Distance: 400 laps, 400 mi (643.737 km)
- Scheduled distance: 400 laps, 400 mi (643.737 km)
- Average speed: 122.626 miles per hour (197.347 km/h)
- Attendance: 150,000

Pole position
Driver	Jimmie Johnson	Hendrick Motorsports
- Time: Set by 2005 owner's points

Most laps led
Driver	Greg Biffle	Roush Racing
- Laps: 150

Winner
No. 16	Greg Biffle	Roush Racing

Television in the United States
- Network: FX
- Announcers: Mike Joy, Larry McReynolds, Darrell Waltrip

Radio in the United States
- Radio: Motor Racing Network

The 2005 MBNA RacePoints 400 was the 13th 2005 NASCAR Nextel Cup Series season and the 37th iteration of the event. The race was held on Sunday, June 5, 2005, before a crowd of 150,000 in Dover, Delaware at Dover International Speedway, a 1 mile (1.6 km) permanent oval-shaped racetrack. The race took the scheduled 400 laps to complete. At race's end, Greg Biffle of Roush Racing would take control in the late stages of the race to take home his seventh career NASCAR Nextel Cup Series win and his fourth of the season. To round out the podium, Kyle Busch of Hendrick Motorsports and Mark Martin of Roush Racing would finish second and third, respectively.

== Background ==
Dover International Speedway is an oval race track in Dover, Delaware, United States that has held at least two NASCAR races since it opened in 1969. In addition to NASCAR, the track also hosted USAC and the NTT IndyCar Series. The track features one layout, a 1 mile (1.6 km) concrete oval, with 24° banking in the turns and 9° banking on the straights. The speedway is owned and operated by Dover Motorsports.

The track, nicknamed "The Monster Mile", was built in 1969 by Melvin Joseph of Melvin L. Joseph Construction Company, Inc., with an asphalt surface, but was replaced with concrete in 1995. Six years later in 2001, the track's capacity moved to 135,000 seats, making the track have the largest capacity of sports venue in the mid-Atlantic. In 2002, the name changed to Dover International Speedway from Dover Downs International Speedway after Dover Downs Gaming and Entertainment split, making Dover Motorsports. From 2007 to 2009, the speedway worked on an improvement project called "The Monster Makeover", which expanded facilities at the track and beautified the track. After the 2014 season, the track's capacity was reduced to 95,500 seats.

#	Driver	Team	Make	Sponsor
0	Mike Bliss	Haas CNC Racing	Chevrolet	NetZero / Best Buy
00	Carl Long	McGlynn Racing	Chevrolet	Buyer's Choice Auto Warranties
01	Joe Nemechek	MB2 Motorsports	Chevrolet	U. S. Army
2	Rusty Wallace	Penske Racing	Dodge	Miller Lite
4	Mike Wallace	Morgan–McClure Motorsports	Chevrolet	Lucas Oil / Wide Open Energy Drink
5	Kyle Busch	Hendrick Motorsports	Chevrolet	Kellogg's
6	Mark Martin	Roush Racing	Ford	Viagra
7	Robby Gordon	Robby Gordon Motorsports	Chevrolet	Harrah's
07	Dave Blaney	Richard Childress Racing	Chevrolet	Jack Daniel's
8	Dale Earnhardt Jr.	Dale Earnhardt, Inc.	Chevrolet	Budweiser
9	Kasey Kahne	Evernham Motorsports	Dodge	Dodge Dealers / UAW
10	Scott Riggs	MBV Motorsports	Chevrolet	Valvoline
11	Jason Leffler	Joe Gibbs Racing	Chevrolet	FedEx Freight
12	Ryan Newman	Penske Racing	Dodge	Alltel
15	Michael Waltrip	Dale Earnhardt, Inc.	Chevrolet	NAPA Auto Parts
16	Greg Biffle	Roush Racing	Ford	National Guard / Charter Communications
17	Matt Kenseth	Roush Racing	Ford	DeWalt
18	Bobby Labonte	Joe Gibbs Racing	Chevrolet	Interstate Batteries
19	Jeremy Mayfield	Evernham Motorsports	Dodge	Dodge Dealers / UAW
20	Tony Stewart	Joe Gibbs Racing	Chevrolet	The Home Depot
21	Ricky Rudd	Wood Brothers Racing	Ford	Motorcraft Genuine Parts
22	Scott Wimmer	Bill Davis Racing	Dodge	Caterpillar
23	Mike Skinner	Bill Davis Racing	Dodge	History Channel's Automaniac
24	Jeff Gordon	Hendrick Motorsports	Chevrolet	DuPont
25	Brian Vickers	Hendrick Motorsports	Chevrolet	GMAC / ditech.com
27	Kirk Shelmerdine	Kirk Shelmerdine Racing	Ford	Freddie B's
29	Kevin Harvick	Richard Childress Racing	Chevrolet	GM Goodwrench
31	Jeff Burton	Richard Childress Racing	Chevrolet	Cingular Wireless GoPhone
32	Bobby Hamilton Jr.	PPI Motorsports	Chevrolet	Tide to Go
34	Jeff Fuller	Mach 1 Motorsports	Chevrolet	Revi Pit Crew Wear
37	Kevin Lepage	R&J Racing	Dodge	R&J Racing
38	Elliott Sadler	Robert Yates Racing	Ford	M&M's
40	Sterling Marlin	Chip Ganassi Racing with Felix Sabates	Dodge	Coors Light
41	Casey Mears	Chip Ganassi Racing with Felix Sabates	Dodge	Target
42	Jamie McMurray	Chip Ganassi Racing with Felix Sabates	Dodge	Texaco / Havoline
43	Jeff Green	Petty Enterprises	Dodge	Cheerios / Betty Crocker
45	Kyle Petty	Petty Enterprises	Dodge	Georgia-Pacific Brawny
48	Jimmie Johnson	Hendrick Motorsports	Chevrolet	Lowe's
49	Ken Schrader	BAM Racing	Dodge	Schwan's Home Service
66	Hermie Sadler	Peak Fitness Racing	Ford	Peak Fitness
77	Travis Kvapil	Penske Racing	Dodge	Kodak / Jasper Engines & Transmissions
88	Dale Jarrett	Robert Yates Racing	Ford	UPS
92	Stanton Barrett	Front Row Motorsports	Chevrolet	Front Row Motorsports
97	Kurt Busch	Roush Racing	Ford	Sharpie / Irwin Industrial Tools
99	Carl Edwards	Roush Racing	Ford	Office Depot
Official entry list

== Practice ==
While there were initially three practices scheduled, with one on Friday and two on Saturday, the lone Friday practice was canceled due to constant rain. Only the two Saturday practices were run.

=== First practice ===
The first 45-minute practice session would occur on Saturday, June 4, at 9:30 AM EST. Jeremy Mayfield of Evernham Motorsports would set the fastest time in the session, with a 22.992 and an average speed of 156.576 miles per hour (251.985 km/h).

Pos.	#	Driver	Team	Make	Time	Speed
1	19	Jeremy Mayfield	Evernham Motorsports	Dodge	22.992	156.576
2	12	Ryan Newman	Penske Racing	Dodge	23.101	155.837
3	6	Mark Martin	Roush Racing	Ford	23.157	155.461
Full first practice results

=== Second and final practice ===
The second and final 45-minute practice session, sometimes referred to as Happy Hour, would occur on Saturday, June 4, at 11:10 AM EST. Jeremy Mayfield of Evernham Motorsports would set the fastest time in the session, with a 23.096 and an average speed of 155.871 miles per hour (250.850 km/h).

Pos.	#	Driver	Team	Make	Time	Speed
1	19	Jeremy Mayfield	Evernham Motorsports	Dodge	23.096	155.871
2	10	Scott Riggs	MBV Motorsports	Chevrolet	23.241	154.899
3	21	Ricky Rudd	Wood Brothers Racing	Ford	23.243	154.885
Full Happy Hour practice results

== Starting lineup ==
Qualifying was originally scheduled to be held on Friday, June 3, at 3:10 PM EST. However, Friday's activities would be rained out and canceled. In the rule of a rain out, the field would be set by the current 2005 owner's points. As a result, Jimmie Johnson of Hendrick Motorsports won the pole.

Due to this, two drivers would fail to qualify as they didn't have enough owner's points: Kirk Shelmerdine and Mike Skinner.

=== Full starting lineup ===
Pos.	#	Driver	Team	Make
1	48	Jimmie Johnson	Hendrick Motorsports	Chevrolet
2	16	Greg Biffle	Roush Racing	Ford
3	38	Elliott Sadler	Robert Yates Racing	Ford
4	12	Ryan Newman	Penske Racing	Dodge
5	24	Jeff Gordon	Hendrick Motorsports	Chevrolet
6	20	Tony Stewart	Joe Gibbs Racing	Chevrolet
7	29	Kevin Harvick	Richard Childress Racing	Chevrolet
8	99	Carl Edwards	Roush Racing	Ford
9	42	Jamie McMurray	Chip Ganassi Racing with Felix Sabates	Dodge
10	97	Kurt Busch	Roush Racing	Ford
11	2	Rusty Wallace	Penske Racing	Dodge
12	6	Mark Martin	Roush Racing	Ford
13	19	Jeremy Mayfield	Evernham Motorsports	Dodge
14	88	Dale Jarrett	Robert Yates Racing	Ford
15	8	Dale Earnhardt Jr.	Dale Earnhardt, Inc.	Chevrolet
16	9	Kasey Kahne	Evernham Motorsports	Dodge
17	31	Jeff Burton	Richard Childress Racing	Chevrolet
18	15	Michael Waltrip	Dale Earnhardt, Inc.	Chevrolet
19	01	Joe Nemechek	MB2 Motorsports	Chevrolet
20	40	Sterling Marlin	Chip Ganassi Racing with Felix Sabates	Dodge
21	10	Scott Riggs	MBV Motorsports	Chevrolet
22	5	Kyle Busch	Hendrick Motorsports	Chevrolet
23	17	Matt Kenseth	Roush Racing	Ford
24	18	Bobby Labonte	Joe Gibbs Racing	Chevrolet
25	07	Dave Blaney	Richard Childress Racing	Chevrolet
26	49	Ken Schrader	BAM Racing	Dodge
27	25	Brian Vickers	Hendrick Motorsports	Chevrolet
28	41	Casey Mears	Chip Ganassi Racing with Felix Sabates	Dodge
29	0	Mike Bliss	Haas CNC Racing	Chevrolet
30	45	Kyle Petty	Petty Enterprises	Dodge
31	43	Jeff Green	Petty Enterprises	Dodge
32	21	Ricky Rudd	Wood Brothers Racing	Ford
33	77	Travis Kvapil	Penske Racing	Dodge
34	4	Mike Wallace	Morgan–McClure Motorsports	Chevrolet
35	22	Scott Wimmer	Bill Davis Racing	Dodge
36	11	Jason Leffler	Joe Gibbs Racing	Chevrolet
37	37	Kevin Lepage	R&J Racing	Dodge
38	32	Bobby Hamilton Jr.	PPI Motorsports	Chevrolet
39	7	Robby Gordon	Robby Gordon Motorsports	Chevrolet
40	66	Hermie Sadler	Peak Fitness Racing	Ford
41	92	Stanton Barrett	Front Row Motorsports	Chevrolet
42	34	Jeff Fuller	Mach 1 Motorsports	Chevrolet
43	00	Carl Long	McGlynn Racing	Chevrolet
Failed to qualify
44	27	Kirk Shelmerdine	Kirk Shelmerdine	Ford
45	23	Mike Skinner	Bill Davis Racing	Dodge
Official starting lineup

== Race results ==
Fin	St	#	Driver	Team	Make	Laps	Led	Status	Pts	Winnings
1	2	16	Greg Biffle	Roush Racing	Ford	400	150	running	190	$282,800
2	22	5	Kyle Busch	Hendrick Motorsports	Chevrolet	400	90	running	175	$208,275
3	12	6	Mark Martin	Roush Racing	Ford	400	0	running	165	$163,450
4	1	48	Jimmie Johnson	Hendrick Motorsports	Chevrolet	400	24	running	165	$178,271
5	11	2	Rusty Wallace	Penske Racing	Dodge	400	0	running	155	$140,183
6	27	25	Brian Vickers	Hendrick Motorsports	Chevrolet	400	0	running	150	$118,455
7	23	17	Matt Kenseth	Roush Racing	Ford	400	0	running	146	$142,321
8	4	12	Ryan Newman	Penske Racing	Dodge	400	0	running	142	$135,806
9	10	97	Kurt Busch	Roush Racing	Ford	400	0	running	138	$140,785
10	3	38	Elliott Sadler	Robert Yates Racing	Ford	400	128	running	139	$138,851
11	21	10	Scott Riggs	MBV Motorsports	Chevrolet	400	0	running	130	$114,758
12	17	31	Jeff Burton	Richard Childress Racing	Chevrolet	399	0	running	127	$113,830
13	18	15	Michael Waltrip	Dale Earnhardt, Inc.	Chevrolet	399	0	running	124	$116,759
14	13	19	Jeremy Mayfield	Evernham Motorsports	Dodge	399	0	running	121	$113,305
15	6	20	Tony Stewart	Joe Gibbs Racing	Chevrolet	399	0	running	118	$130,496
16	8	99	Carl Edwards	Roush Racing	Ford	398	0	running	115	$98,060
17	33	77	Travis Kvapil	Penske Racing	Dodge	398	0	running	112	$91,475
18	29	0	Mike Bliss	Haas CNC Racing	Chevrolet	398	0	running	109	$83,860
19	30	45	Kyle Petty	Petty Enterprises	Dodge	398	0	running	106	$98,078
20	36	11	Jason Leffler	Joe Gibbs Racing	Chevrolet	398	0	running	103	$83,320
21	38	32	Bobby Hamilton Jr.	PPI Motorsports	Chevrolet	398	0	running	100	$94,768
22	15	8	Dale Earnhardt Jr.	Dale Earnhardt, Inc.	Chevrolet	397	0	running	97	$123,968
23	14	88	Dale Jarrett	Robert Yates Racing	Ford	397	0	running	94	$114,518
24	28	41	Casey Mears	Chip Ganassi Racing with Felix Sabates	Dodge	397	0	running	91	$98,413
25	7	29	Kevin Harvick	Richard Childress Racing	Chevrolet	396	0	running	88	$122,216
26	9	42	Jamie McMurray	Chip Ganassi Racing with Felix Sabates	Dodge	395	0	running	85	$85,530
27	19	01	Joe Nemechek	MB2 Motorsports	Chevrolet	395	0	running	82	$94,427
28	34	4	Mike Wallace	Morgan–McClure Motorsports	Chevrolet	394	0	running	79	$76,230
29	39	7	Robby Gordon	Robby Gordon Motorsports	Chevrolet	394	8	running	81	$76,080
30	31	43	Jeff Green	Petty Enterprises	Dodge	390	0	running	73	$104,866
31	35	22	Scott Wimmer	Bill Davis Racing	Dodge	390	0	running	70	$80,780
32	20	40	Sterling Marlin	Chip Ganassi Racing with Felix Sabates	Dodge	388	0	running	67	$100,528
33	37	37	Kevin Lepage	R&J Racing	Dodge	382	0	running	64	$73,420
34	41	92	Stanton Barrett	Front Row Motorsports	Chevrolet	377	0	running	61	$72,285
35	16	9	Kasey Kahne	Evernham Motorsports	Dodge	283	0	crash	58	$104,145
36	25	07	Dave Blaney	Richard Childress Racing	Chevrolet	135	0	crash	55	$79,955
37	26	49	Ken Schrader	BAM Racing	Dodge	135	0	crash	52	$71,800
38	24	18	Bobby Labonte	Joe Gibbs Racing	Chevrolet	51	0	engine	49	$106,265
39	5	24	Jeff Gordon	Hendrick Motorsports	Chevrolet	41	0	crash	46	$120,316
40	32	21	Ricky Rudd	Wood Brothers Racing	Ford	41	0	crash	43	$98,664
41	40	66	Hermie Sadler	Peak Fitness Racing	Ford	37	0	suspension	40	$71,320
42	43	00	Carl Long	McGlynn Racing	Chevrolet	26	0	overheating	37	$71,225
43	42	34	Jeff Fuller	Mach 1 Motorsports	Chevrolet	15	0	vibration	34	$71,463
Failed to qualify
44		27	Kirk Shelmerdine	Kirk Shelmerdine	Ford					
45		23	Mike Skinner	Bill Davis Racing	Dodge					
Official race results

Previous race: 2005 Coca-Cola 600	NASCAR Nextel Cup Series; 2005 season	Next race: 2005 Pocono 500
