= 1994–95 NASCAR SuperTruck Series exhibition races =

In 1994 and early 1995, seven non-championship demonstration races for the newly-born NASCAR SuperTruck Series were held. The races were broadcast during coverage of the Winter Heat Series and were held on tracks primarily based on the West Coast of the United States, featuring four to five trucks each. The series helped begin the careers of future NASCAR drivers like Greg Biffle, Kurt Busch, Matt Crafton, and Ron Hornaday Jr.

Another exhibition race was held at the Homestead–Miami Speedway at the end of the 1995 season called the NASCAR Supertruck 25, though not as a Winter Heat race.

== Supertruck Mesa Marin 20 ==
1994 Supertruck Mesa Marin 20
Race details
- Date: July 30, 1994
- Location: Mesa Marin Raceway, Bakersfield, California
- Course: Permanent racing facility
- Course length: 0.500 miles (0.805 km)
- Distance: 20 laps, 10 mi (16.093 km)
- Average speed: 81.818 mph (131.673 km/h)

Pole position
Driver	Craig Huartson	Bruce Huartson Race Team

Most laps led
Drivers	P. J. Jones	Vestar Motorsports
	Dave Ashley	Dick Landfield Enduro Racing
- Laps: 7

Winner
No. 1	P. J. Jones	Vestar Motorsports

The race was run as a support event to the NASCAR Featherlite Southwest Tour.

Craig Huartson, a NASCAR AutoZone Elite Division, Southeast Series driver, won the pole for the race with a lap speed of 91.227 miles per hour (146.816 km/h). After leading the first lap, he lost the lead to offroad racer Dave Ashley, who led for seven laps before relinquishing it to Rob MacCachren. MacCachren would lead until lap 13, when P. J. Jones claimed first, and led for the remainder of the race, beating Gary Collins by 15 seconds. Jones won the race in a Ford, though the team switched to Chevrolet for the next race after General Motors offered the team a technical package.

=== Race results ===
Pos	Grid	Car	Driver	Team	Manufacturer	Laps run	Laps Led
1	4	1	P. J. Jones	Vestar Motorsports	Ford	20	7
2	5	12	Gary Collins	Venable Racing	Ford	20	0
3	3	21	Rob MacCachren	Venable Racing	Ford	20	5
4	1	8	Craig Huartson	Bunce Huartson Race Team	Chevrolet	20	1
5	2	2	Dave Ashley	Dick Lanfield Enduro Racing	Ford	20	7

== Supertruck Portland 20 ==
1994 Supertruck Portland 20
Race details
- Date: August 19, 1994
- Location: Portland Speedway, Portland, Oregon
- Course: Permanent racing facility
- Course length: 0.5 miles (0.805 km)
- Distance: 20 laps, 10 mi (16.093 km)
- Average speed: 81.818 mph (131.673 km/h)

Pole position
Driver	Craig Huartson	Bruce Huartson Race Team

Most laps led
Driver	Rob MacCachren	Venable Racing
- Laps: 20

Winner
No. 21	Rob MacCachren	Venable Racing

The race, run as an undercard to the NASCAR AutoZone Elite Division, Northwest Series, was sold out.

After starting second, Rob MacCachren led all 20 laps of the race.

=== Race results ===
Race results
Pos	Grid	Car	Driver	Team	Manufacturer	Laps run	Laps Led
1	2	21	Rob MacCachren	Venable Racing	Ford	20	20
2	5	12	Gary Collins	Venable Racing	Ford	20	0
3	6	1	P. J. Jones	Vestar Motorsports	Ford	20	0
4	3	8	Craig Huartson	Bunce Huartson Race Team	Chevrolet	20	0
5	1	2	Dave Ashley	Dick Lanfield Enduro Racing	Ford	20	0
6	4	11	Mike Hurlbert	RPM Racing	Ford	20	0

== Supertruck Saugus 20 ==
1994 Supertruck Saugus 20
Race details
- Date: September 10, 1994
- Location: Saugus Speedway, Saugus, California
- Course: Permanent racing facility
- Course length: 0.333 miles (0.536 km)
- Distance: 15 laps, 5 mi (8.047 km)
- Scheduled distance: 20 laps, 6.66 mi (10.718 km)
- Average speed: 54.38 mph (87.52 km/h)

Pole position
Driver	Gary Collins	Venable Racing

Most laps led
Driver	Gary Collins	Venable Racing
- Laps: 15

Winner
No. 12	Gary Collins	Venable Racing

The race, held as part of a Featherlite Southwest Tour race weekend, featured a sellout crowd of 6,308.

Gary Collins led the entire race. Originally scheduled for 20 laps, the race was cut by five laps after an incident on lap 14 and after the caution started to rain; P. J. Jones, who was in second, backed his Ford into the wall between turns 3 and 4. At the same time, it began raining at the track which led the race to be the first ever Truck series event shortened due to rain. As a result, the race ended under caution. Craig Huartson did not finish the race when his engine failed after completing four laps.

=== Race results ===
Race results
Pos	Grid	Car	Driver	Team	Manufacturer	Laps run	Laps Led
1	1	12	Gary Collins	Venable Racing	Ford	15	15
2	3	11	Mike Hurlbert	RPM Racing	Ford	15	0
3	2	1	P. J. Jones	Vestar Motorsports	Ford	15	0
4	4	8	Craig Huartson	Bunce Huartson Race Team	Chevrolet	4	0

== Supertruck Tucson 20 ==
1994 Supertruck Tucson 20
Race details
- Date: September 24, 1994
- Location: Tucson Raceway Park, Tucson, Arizona
- Course: Permanent racing facility
- Course length: 0.375 miles (0.604 km)
- Distance: 25 laps, 9.375 mi (15.088 km)

Pole position
Driver	Ron Hornaday Jr.	Spears Motorsports

Most laps led
Driver	Ron Hornaday Jr.	Spears Motorsports
- Laps: 14

Winner
No. 75	Ron Hornaday Jr.	Spears Motorsports

Mike Hurlbert failed to start the race. After Gary Collins led the first lap, P. J. Jones, Ron Hornaday Jr. and Rick Carelli each led for one lap until Jones inherited the lead on lap 5. Craig Huartson led lap 6 before Jones reclaimed first, leading for three laps. Huartson retook the lead on lap 10, but relinquished it to Rob MacCachren on lap 11, who led two laps before Hornaday passed him for first. Hornaday led the final 13 laps to win the race.

=== Race results ===
Race results
Pos	Grid	Car	Driver	Team	Manufacturer	Laps run	Laps Led
1	1	75	Ron Hornaday Jr.	Spears Motorsports	Chevrolet	25	14
2	3	1	P. J. Jones	Vestar Motorsports	Ford	25	5
3	2	12	Gary Collins	Venable Racing	Ford	25	1
4	5	6	Rick Carelli	Chesrown Racing	Chevrolet	25	1
5	4	8	Craig Huartson	Bunce Huartson Race Team	Ford	25	2
6	6	21	Rob MacCachren	Venable Racing	Ford	25	2
7	7	11	Mike Hurlbert	RPM Racing	Chevrolet	0	0

== Supertruck Winter Heat 200 No. 1 ==
1994 Supertruck Winter Heat 200 No. 1
Race details
- Date: November 20, 1994
- Location: Tucson Raceway Park, Tucson, Arizona
- Course: Permanent racing facility
- Course length: 0.375 miles (0.604 km)
- Distance: 200 laps, 75 mi (120.701 km)
- Average speed: 74.324 mph (119.613 km/h)

Pole position
Driver	Rick Carelli	Chesrown Racing

Most laps led
Driver	Rick Carelli	Chesrown Racing
- Laps: 107

Winner
No. 6	Rick Carelli	Chesrown Racing

Television in the United States
- Network: TNN

The race, along with the next two, were broadcast nationally by The Nashville Network as part of the Winter Heat program, an eight-week series featuring both the SuperTrucks and the Winston West Series. Former San Francisco 49ers kicker Mike Cofer, who had won on the regional Southwest Tour, was initially scheduled to run the race but did not.

Mike Skinner led the first 62 laps of the race; halfway through his run, a caution for debris was called on lap 32. Rick Carelli and Skinner traded the lead on laps 64 and 65 before the former led 79 straight laps. The No. 54 of Steve McEachern spun on the frontstretch on lap 86, bringing out the second caution of the day. On lap 137, T. J. Clark crashed in turn two to force a third caution. Shortly after the green flag wove on lap 143, Ron Hornaday Jr. took the lead, leading for 24 laps before relinquishing it to Carelli. The two battled for first until lap 176, when Carelli held on to the position for the final 25 laps to win.

Dave Ashley failed to start the race. Off-road racer Robby Gordon suffered an engine failure on lap 53, while Mike Hurlbert and T. J. Clark had rear end and suspension problems on laps 86 and 127, respectively.

=== Race results ===
Race results
Pos	Grid	Car	Driver	Team	Manufacturer	Laps run	Laps Led
1	6	6	Rick Carelli	Chesrown Racing	Chevrolet	200	107
2	8	1	P. J. Jones	Vestar Motorsports	Ford	200	0
3	5	75	Ron Hornaday Jr.	Spears Motorsports	Chevrolet	200	30
4	4	9	Dirk Stephens	Butch Stevens	Chevrolet	200	0
5	3	18	Johnny Benson	Roehrig Motorsports	Chevrolet	199	0
6	14	21	Gary Collins	Venable Racing	Ford	199	0
7	9	38	Sammy Swindell	Akins-Sutton Motorsports	Ford	199	0
8	1	3	Mike Skinner	Richard Childress Racing	Chevrolet	199	63
9	2	8	Craig Huartson	Bunce Huartson Race Team	Chevrolet	198	0
10	7	12	Rob MacCachren	Venable Racing	Ford	197	0
11	10	54	Steve McEachern	McEachern Racing	Chevrolet	197	0
12	12	20	Walker Evans	Walker Evans Racing	Dodge	197	0
13	11	23	T. J. Clark	Clark Racing	Ford	196	0
14	13	11	Mike Hurlbert	RPM Racing	Ford	127	0
15	15	06	Robby Gordon	Ultra Motorsports	Ford	86	0
16	16	2	Dave Ashley	Ultra Motorsports	Ford	0	0

== Supertruck Winter Heat 200 No. 2 ==
1994 Supertruck Winter Heat 200 No. 2
Race details
- Date: December 11, 1994
- Location: Tucson Raceway Park, Tucson, Arizona
- Course: Permanent racing facility
- Course length: 0.375 miles (0.604 km)
- Distance: 200 laps, 75 mi (120.701 km)
- Average speed: 76.444 mph (123.025 km/h)

Pole position
Driver	Ron Hornaday Jr.	Spears Motorsports

Most laps led
Driver	Mike Skinner	Richard Childress Racing
- Laps: 106

Winner
No. 1	P. J. Jones	Vestar Motorsports

Television in the United States
- Network: TNN

The second of the Winter Heat races, a competition caution was implemented to be flown at the race's halfway point on lap 100. Pole-sitter Ron Hornaday Jr. led the first 71 laps of the event. During his run, a caution was flown on lap 38 for Ken Schrader's slow truck. Hornaday gave up the lead to Mike Skinner on lap 72. Steve McEachern spun in turn 4 on lap 131 to force another caution, while the third and final yellow flag of the day occurred on lap 141 for debris. Skinner continued to lead until lap 177 when P. J. Jones passed him. Jones led the final 23 laps to win.

Two drivers failed to finish the race: Kerry Teague's engine failed on lap 38, while Johnny Benson failed to start.

=== Race results ===
Race results
Pos	Grid	Car	Driver	Team	Manufacturer	Laps run	Laps Led
1	5	1	P. J. Jones	Vestar Motorsports	Ford	200	23
2	1	75	Ron Hornaday Jr.	Spears Motorsports	Chevrolet	200	71
3	2	3	Mike Skinner	Richard Childress Racing	Chevrolet	200	106
4	11	6	Rick Carelli	Chesrown Racing	Chevrolet	200	0
5	6	21	Mike Chase	Venable Racing	Ford	200	0
6	13	12	Tobey Butler	Venable Racing	Ford	199	0
7	9	23	T. J. Clark	Clark Racing	Ford	198	0
8	10	2	Dave Ashley	Ultra Motorsports	Ford	197	0
9	15	20	Walker Evans	Walker Evans Racing	Dodge	197	0
10	3	24	Ken Schrader	Hendrick Motorsports	Chevrolet	197	0
11	8	06	Mike Bliss	Ultra Motorsports	Ford	195	0
12	4	8	Craig Huartson	Bunce Huartson Race Team	Chevrolet	193	0
13	12	31	Gary Balough	Griffin Racing	Chevrolet	188	0
14	16	11	Mike Hurlbert	RPM Racing	Ford	182	0
15	7	54	Steve McEachern	McEachern Racing	Chevrolet	175	0
16	14	51	Kerry Teague	Rosenblum Racing	Chevrolet	38	0
17	N/A	18	Johnny Benson	Roehrig Motorsports	Chevrolet	0	0

== Supertruck Winter Heat No. 3 (1995) ==
1994 Supertruck Winter Heat 200 No. 3
Race details
- Date: January 8, 1995
- Location: Tucson Raceway Park, Tucson, Arizona
- Course: Permanent racing facility
- Course length: 0.375 miles (0.604 km)
- Distance: 204 laps, 76.5 mi (123.115 km)
- Scheduled distance: 200 laps, 75 mi (120.701 km)
- Average speed: 66.043 mph (106.286 km/h)

Pole position
Driver	Butch Gilliland	Ultra Motorsports

Most laps led
Driver	Ron Hornaday Jr.	Spears Motorsports
- Laps: 128

Winner
No. 3	Mike Skinner	Richard Childress Racing

Television in the United States
- Network: TNN

In comparison to the first two Winter Heat races, the third was marred by cautions; six accidents occurred during the race. Butch Gilliland led the first ten laps of the race before Ron Hornaday Jr. took the lead, holding on for 91 laps. During Hornaday's run from laps 11–101, two cautions were flown: Bob Strait and Steve McEachern crashed in turn three on lap 39, while Craig Huartson spun in turn one on lap 59. The third caution, a result of Kerry Teague's truck spilling oil on the track, resulted in Hornaday losing the lead to Rick Carelli. He led until lap 149, when Mike Skinner took first. Two laps later, the Nos. 2 and 23 trucks of Dave Ashley and T. J. Clark were involved in a crash in turn one. The final caution period of the day came on lap 197 when Gilliland spun in turn four, forcing a green–white–checker finish and extending the race by four laps. Skinner led those laps to win the race.

Of the 18 drivers competing, seven did not finish the race: T. J. Clark retired on lap 187 for overheating issues, P. J. Jones' brakes failed on lap 165, Tobey Butler and Teague both suffered engine problems on laps 100 and 99, respectively, Walker Evans' truck overheated on lap 73 and Strait and McEachern's crash forced both of them out of the race.

=== Race results ===
Race results
Pos	Grid	Car	Driver	Team	Manufacturer	Laps run	Laps Led
1	3	3	Mike Skinner	Richard Childress Racing	Chevrolet	204	55
2	4	75	Ron Hornaday Jr.	Spears Motorsports	Chevrolet	204	128
3	2	6	Rick Carelli	Chesrown Racing	Chevrolet	204	11
4	5	18	Johnny Benson	Roehrig Motorsports	Chevrolet	204	0
5	9	31	Gary Balough	Griffin Racing	Chevrolet	203	0
6	18	38	Sammy Swindell	Akins-Sutton Motorsports	Ford	202	0
7	6	12	Scott Lagasse	Venable Racing	Ford	202	0
8	1	06	Butch Gilliland	Ultra Motorsports	Ford	202	10
9	17	2	Dave Ashley	Ultra Motorsports	Ford	198	0
10	16	11	Mike Hurlbert	RPM Racing	Ford	194	0
11	11	23	T. J. Clark	Clark Racing	Ford	187	0
12	7	8	Craig Huartson	Bunce Huartson Race Team	Chevrolet	174	0
13	10	1	P. J. Jones	Vestar Motorsports	Ford	165	0
14	8	21	Tobey Butler	Venable racing	Ford	100	0
15	14	51	Kerry Teague	Rosenblum Racing	Chevrolet	99	0
16	15	20	Walker Evans	Walker Evans Racing	Dodge	73	0
17	12	37	Bob Strait	Strait Racing	Ford	38	0
18	13	54	Steve McEachern	McEachern Racing	Chevrolet	38	0

== NASCAR Supertruck 25 (1995) ==
1995 NASCAR Supertruck 25
Race details
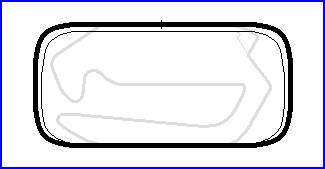
- Map of Homestead–Miami Speedway
- Date: November 4, 1995
- Location: Homestead–Miami Speedway, Homestead, Florida
- Course: Permanent racing facility
- Course length: 1.5 miles (2.414 km)
- Distance: 25 laps, 37.5 mi (60.35 km)

Pole position
Driver	Jimmy Hensley	Grandaddy Racing

Most laps led
Driver	Mike Skinner	Richard Childress Racing
- Laps: 12

Winner
No. 7	Geoff Bodine	Geoff Bodine Racing

Following the end of the 1995 NASCAR SuperTruck Series season, the series held a 25-lap exhibition race at the newly-opened Homestead–Miami Speedway. At the time, the track resembled a smaller Indianapolis Motor Speedway and was praised by series champion Mike Skinner. As trucks weren't as aerodynamic as regular stock cars, he commented, drivers had to be more cautious entering the turns.

Pole-sitter Jimmy Hensley led the first two laps before Skinner took the lead. Skinner led until lap 12, when the competition caution was waved, and Geoff Bodine claimed first. Bodine led for three laps, followed by Skinner leading for a lap, then Butch Miller for two laps. Bodine took the lead from Miller on lap 19, and led all but one of the final seven laps (Skinner led lap 22) to beat Skinner by 0.1 seconds. Ernie Irvan, who had failed to qualify for the Busch Series race, finished third.

The track was added to the 1996 NASCAR Craftsman Truck Series schedule as the opening race.

=== Race results ===
Race results
Pos	Grid	Car	Driver	Team	Manufacturer	Laps run	Laps Led
1	4	7	Geoff Bodine	Geoff Bodine Racing	Ford	25	9
2	9	3	Mike Skinner	Richard Childress Racing	Chevrolet	25	12
3	2	28	Ernie Irvan	Irvan-Simo Racing	Ford	25	0
4	8	98	Butch Miller	Liberty Racing	Ford	25	2
5	1	30	Jimmy Hensley	Grandaddy Racing	Dodge	25	2
6	7	6	Rick Carelli	Chesrown Racing	Chevrolet	25	0
7	5	87	John Nemechek	NEMCO Motorsports	Chevrolet	25	0
8	3	1	Mike Chase	Vestar Motorsports	Chevrolet	25	0
9	10	63	Ron Esau	Bunce Engineering	Chevrolet	25	0
10	6	64	Michael Dokken	Dokken Racing	Chevrolet	20	0

== See also ==
- 1994 NASCAR Winston Cup Series
- 1994 NASCAR Busch Series
- 1994 NASCAR Winston Transcontinental Series
- 1995 NASCAR SuperTruck Series
- 1995 NASCAR Winston Cup Series
- 1995 NASCAR Busch Series
- 1995 NASCAR Winston West Series
