= Jaron Giannini =

American racing driver (born 2004)

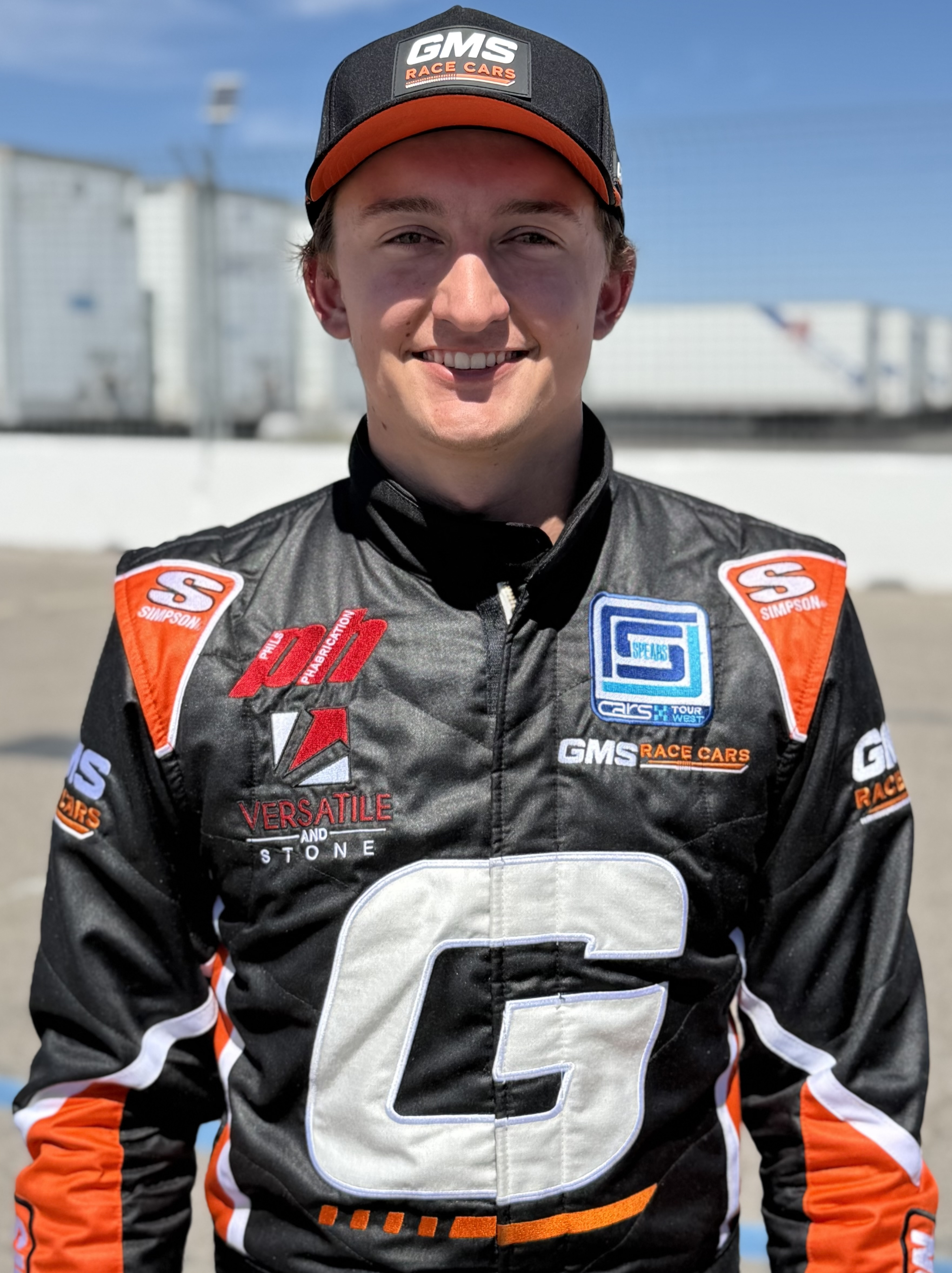
- Giannini in 2026
- Born: November 16, 2004 (age 21); Las Vegas, Nevada, U.S.

ARCA Menards Series West career
- 8 races run over 2 years
- Best finish: 14th (2024)
- First race: 2024 NAPA Auto Parts 150 presented by the West Coast Stock Car Motorsports Hall of Fame (Irwindale)
- Last race: 2025 Madera 150 (Madera)
Wins	Top tens	Poles
0	7	2
- Statistics up to date as of November 2, 2025.

Jaron Giannini (born November 16, 2004) is an American professional stock car racing driver who last competed part-time in the ARCA Menards Series West, driving the No. 23 Toyota for Clark Racing.

== Racing career ==
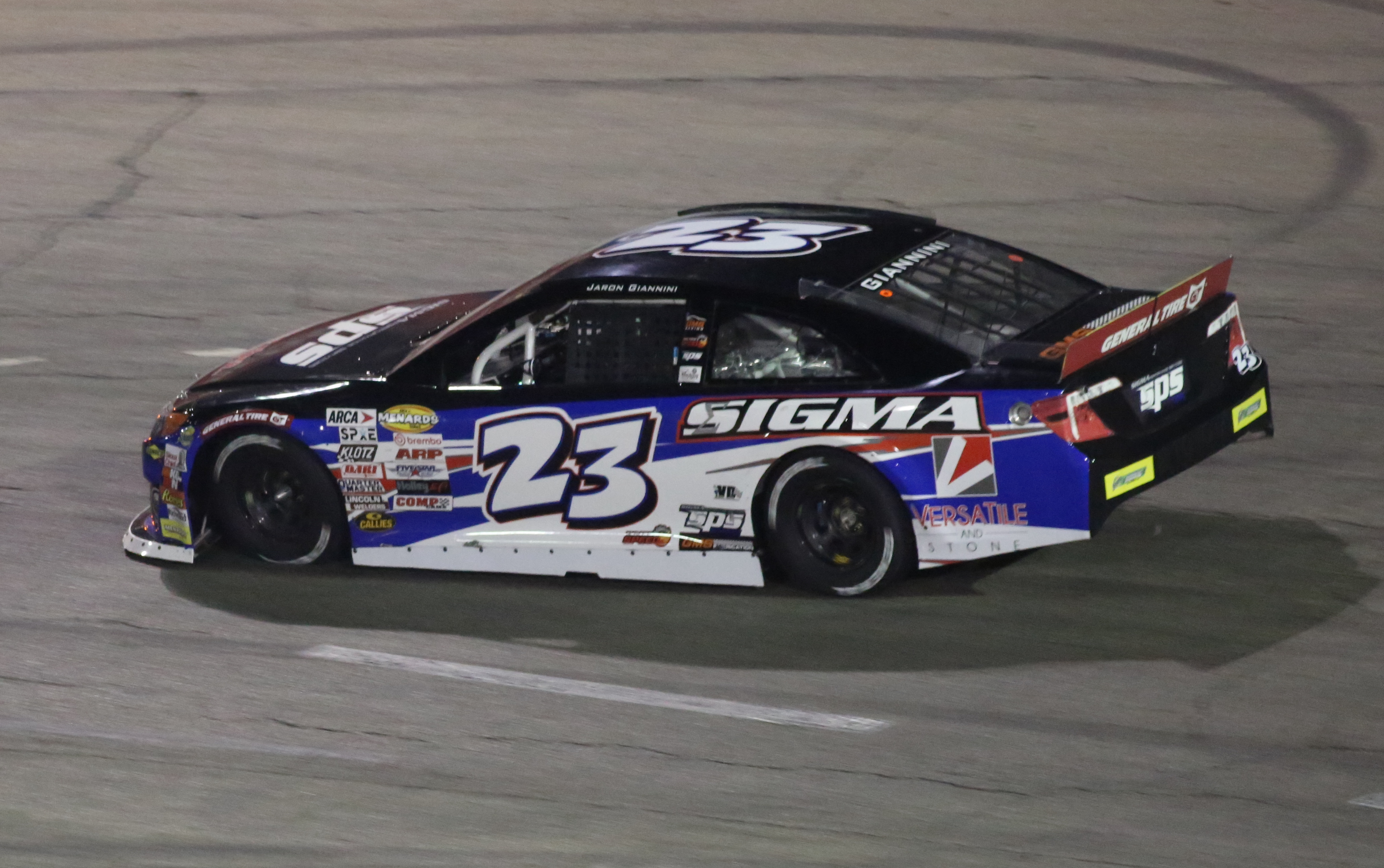
Giannini's No. 23 car at All American Speedway in 2024.

Giannini has previously competed in series such as the CARS Tour West Pro Late Model Series, the SRL SPEARS Pro Late Model Series, the Lucas Oil Modified Series, the INEX Winter Nationals, and the Rocky Mountain Legend Racing Association Series.

In 2024, Giannini made his debut in the ARCA Menards Series West at the double-header weekend at Irwindale Speedway, driving the No. 23 Chevrolet for Sigma Performance Services. In the Thursday race, he set the ninth quickest time in the lone practice session, qualified in thirteenth, and finished the race in sixth place. In the Saturday race, Giannini set the eleventh quickest time in practice, qualified in ninth, and finished on the lead lap in fifth place.

== Motorsports results ==
=== ARCA Menards Series West ===
(key) (Bold – Pole position awarded by qualifying time. Italics – Pole position earned by points standings or practice time. * – Most laps led. ** – All laps led.)

ARCA Menards Series West results
Year	Team	No.	Make	1	2	3	4	5	6	7	8	9	10	11	12	AMSWC	Pts	Ref
2024	Sigma Performance Services	23	Chevy	PHO	KER	PIR	SON	IRW; 6	IRW; 5							14th	224	
2024	Sigma Performance Services	23	Toyota							SHA; 11	TRI	**MAD**; 6	AAS; 7	KER; 7	PHO	14th	224	
2025	Clark Racing	23	Toyota	KER	PHO	TUC	CNS	KER; 7	SON	TRI	PIR	AAS	**MAD**; 6	LVS	PHO	28th	76	
