= 2025 Madera 150 =

10th race of the 2025 ARCA Menards Series West

2025 Madera 150 presented by Madera Ford and the West Coast Stock Car Motorsports Hall of Fame
Race details
- Race 10 of 12 in the 2025 ARCA Menards Series West season
- Trevor Huddleston - the eventual winner of the Madera 150 at Madera Speedway in 2025
- Date: September 27, 2025
- Location: Madera Speedway in Madera, California
- Course: Permanent racing facility
- Course length: 0.333 miles (0.536 km)
- Distance: 150 laps, 50 mi (80 km)
- Scheduled distance: 150 laps, 50 mi (80 km)
- Average speed: 51.984 mph (83.660 km/h)

Pole position
Driver	Jaron Giannini	Clark Racing
- Time: 14.891

Most laps led
Driver	Trevor Huddleston	High Point Racing
- Laps: 150

Winner
No. 50	Trevor Huddleston	High Point Racing

Television in the United States
- Network: FloRacing
- Announcers: Charles Krall

Radio in the United States
- Radio: ARCA Racing Network

The 2025 Madera 150 presented by Madera Ford and the West Coast Stock Car Motorsports Hall of Fame was the 10th stock car race of the 2025 ARCA Menards Series West season, and the 3rd iteration of the event. The race was held on Saturday, September 27, 2025, at Madera Speedway in Madera, California, a 0.333 mile (0.536 km) permanent oval shaped short track. The race took the scheduled 150 laps to complete. Trevor Huddleston, driving for High Point Racing, would put on a dominating performance, leading every lap after starting second and held off a challenging Kyle Keller in the final laps to earn his eighth career ARCA Menards Series West win, and his third of the season. To fill out the podium, Keller, driving for Jan's Towing Racing, and Eric Johnson Jr., driving for Jerry Pitts Racing, would finish 2nd and 3rd, respectively.

== Report ==
=== Background ===
Madera Speedway is a 0.333 mile (0.536 km) oval race track located in Madera, California. It was built in 1971 and currently hosts the 51FIFTY Jr. Late Model Series and the Nut Up Pro Late Model Series. In 2023, the track began hosting the ARCA Menards Series West, with the inaugural race being held on October 21 and has hosted events in the series since then.

==== Entry list ====
- (R) denotes rookie driver.

#	Driver	Team	Make
1	Robbie Kennealy (R)	Jan's Towing Racing	Ford
3	Todd Souza	Central Coast Racing	Toyota
4	Eric Nascimento	Nascimento Motorsports	Chevrolet
05	David Smith	Shockwave Motorsports	Toyota
5	Eric Johnson Jr.	Jerry Pitts Racing	Toyota
13	Tanner Reif	Central Coast Racing	Toyota
19	Jake Bollman (R)	Bill McAnally Racing	Chevrolet
21	Monty Tipton	Nascimento Motorsports	Toyota
23	Jaron Giannini	Clark Racing	Toyota
50	Trevor Huddleston	High Point Racing	Ford
51	Blake Lothian (R)	Strike Mamba Racing	Chevrolet
55	Andrew Chapman	High Point Racing	Ford
71	Kyle Keller	Jan's Towing Racing	Ford
72	Cody Dennison	Strike Mamba Racing	Chevrolet
77	Nick Joanides	Performance P–1 Motorsports	Toyota
88	Joey Iest	Naake-Klauer Motorsports	Ford
Official entry list

== Practice ==
The first and only practice session was held on Saturday, September 27, at 2:30 PM PST, and would last for 60 minutes. Robbie Kennealy, driving for Jan's Towing Racing, would set the fastest time in the session, with a lap of 14.924, and a speed of 80.327 mph (129.274 km/h).

Pos.	#	Driver	Team	Make	Time	Speed
1	1	Robbie Kennealy (R)	Jan's Towing Racing	Ford	14.924	80.327
2	50	Trevor Huddleston	High Point Racing	Ford	14.927	80.311
3	71	Kyle Keller	Jan's Towing Racing	Ford	14.945	80.214
Full practice results

== Qualifying ==
Qualifying was held on Saturday, September 27, at 4:30 PM PST. The qualifying procedure used is a single-car, two-lap system with one round. Drivers will be on track by themselves and will have two laps to post a qualifying time, and whoever sets the fastest time will win the pole.

Jaron Giannini, driving for Clark Racing, would score the pole for the race, with a lap of 14.864, and a speed of 80.651 mph (129.795 km/h).

=== Qualifying results ===
Pos.	#	Driver	Team	Make	Time	Speed
1	23	Jaron Giannini	Clark Racing	Toyota	14.864	80.651
2	50	Trevor Huddleston	High Point Racing	Ford	14.891	80.505
3	1	Robbie Kennealy (R)	Jan's Towing Racing	Ford	14.900	80.456
4	4	Eric Nascimento	Nascimento Motorsports	Chevrolet	14.914	80.381
5	19	Jake Bollman (R)	Bill McAnally Racing	Chevrolet	14.945	80.214
6	5	Eric Johnson Jr.	Jerry Pitts Racing	Toyota	14.949	80.193
7	13	Tanner Reif	Central Coast Racing	Toyota	14.951	80.182
8	71	Kyle Keller	Jan's Towing Racing	Ford	14.960	80.134
9	88	Joey Iest	Naake-Klauer Motorsports	Ford	14.980	80.027
10	55	Andrew Chapman	High Point Racing	Ford	15.026	79.782
11	3	Todd Souza	Central Coast Racing	Toyota	15.104	79.370
12	51	Blake Lothian (R)	Strike Mamba Racing	Chevrolet	15.112	79.328
13	21	Monty Tipton	Nascimento Motorsports	Toyota	15.132	79.223
14	77	Nick Joanides	Performance P–1 Motorsports	Toyota	15.434	77.673
15	05	David Smith	Shockwave Motorsports	Toyota	15.478	77.452
16	72	Cody Dennison	Strike Mamba Racing	Chevrolet	15.498	77.352
Official qualifying results

== Race results ==
Fin	St	#	Driver	Team	Make	Laps	Led	Status	Pts
1	2	50	Trevor Huddleston	High Point Racing	Ford	150	150	Running	98
2	8	71	Kyle Keller	Jan's Towing Racing	Ford	150	0	Running	92
3	6	5	Eric Johnson Jr.	Jerry Pitts Racing	Toyota	150	0	Running	91
4	3	1	Robbie Kennealy (R)	Jan's Towing Racing	Ford	150	0	Running	90
5	9	88	Joey Iest	Naake-Klauer Motorsports	Ford	150	0	Running	39
6	1	23	Jaron Giannini	Clark Racing	Toyota	150	0	Running	39
7	10	55	Andrew Chapman	High Point Racing	Ford	150	0	Running	37
8	7	13	Tanner Reif	Central Coast Racing	Toyota	150	0	Running	86
9	12	51	Blake Lothian (R)	Strike Mamba Racing	Chevrolet	150	0	Running	85
10	4	4	Eric Nascimento	Nascimento Motorsports	Chevrolet	149	0	Running	34
11	11	3	Todd Souza	Central Coast Racing	Toyota	148	0	Running	33
12	15	05	David Smith	Shockwave Motorsports	Toyota	142	0	Running	82
13	16	72	Cody Dennison	Strike Mamba Racing	Chevrolet	68	0	Mechanical	31
14	14	77	Nick Joanides	Performance P–1 Motorsports	Toyota	66	0	Mechanical	30
15	13	21	Monty Tipton	Nascimento Motorsports	Toyota	10	0	Mechanical	29
16	5	19	Jake Bollman (R)	Bill McAnally Racing	Chevrolet	1	0	Mechanical	28
Official race results

== Standings after the race ==
Drivers' Championship standings

Pos	Driver	Points
1	Trevor Huddleston	517
2	Kyle Keller	499 (–18)
3	Tanner Reif	479 (–38)
4	Robbie Kennealy	475 (–42)
5	Eric Johnson Jr.	473 (–44)
6	Blake Lothian	421 (–96)
7	David Smith	397 (–120)
8	Jake Bollman	255 (–262)
9	Todd Souza	229 (–288)
10	Jonathan Reaume	145 (–372)

- Note: Only the first 10 positions are included for the driver standings.

Previous race: 2025 NAPA Auto Parts 150 (Roseville)	ARCA Menards Series West; 2025 season	Next race: 2025 Star Nursery 150
