= Ilmor NT1 =

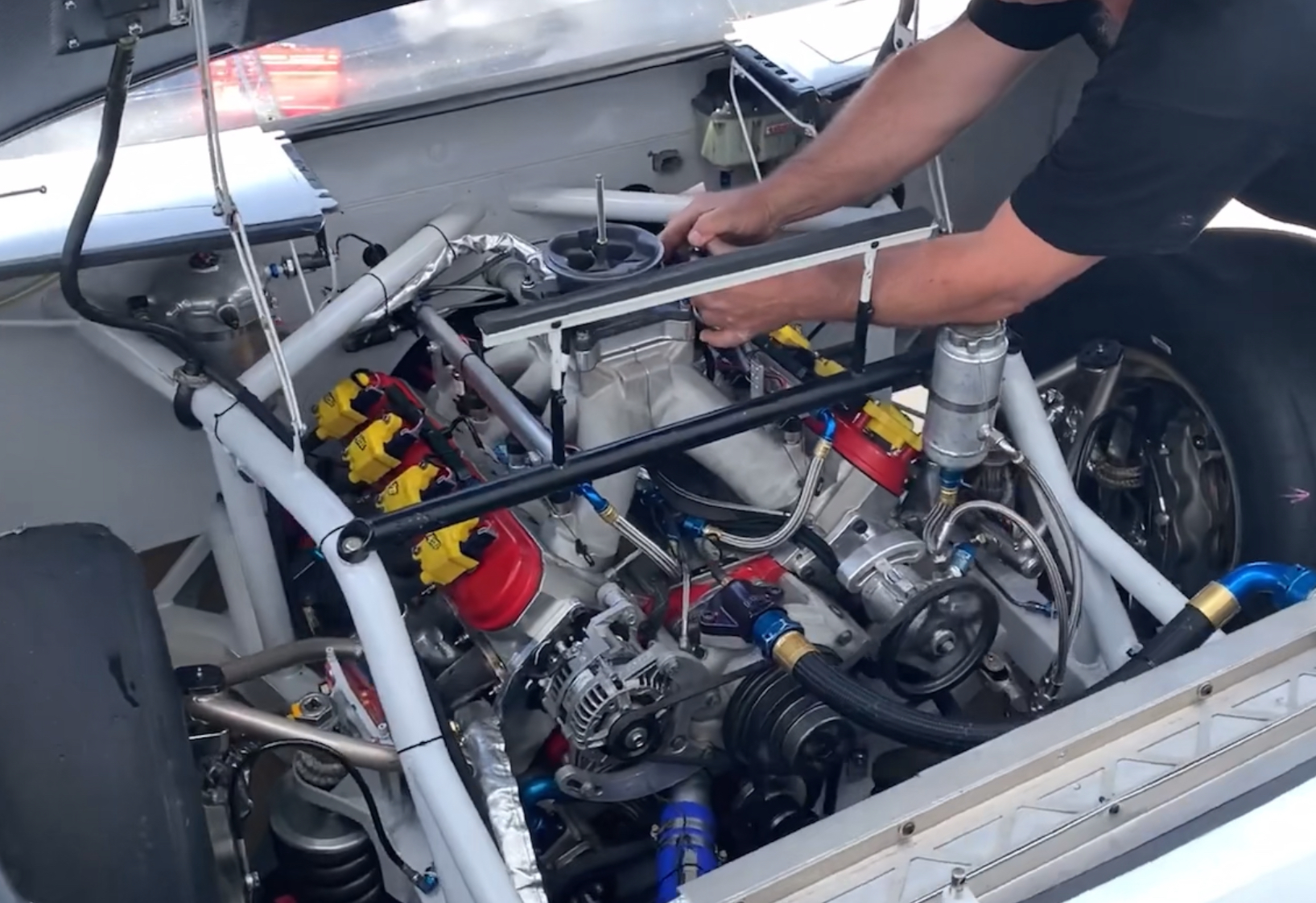
- An NT1 pictured at Young's Motorsports in August 2020

Overview
- Manufacturer: Ilmor
- Production: 2018–present

Layout
- Configuration: V8 engine, 90° cylinder angle
- Displacement: 6.2 L (6,162 cc)
- Cylinder bore: 106.3 mm (4.2 in)
- Piston stroke: 91.44 mm (4 in)
- Cylinder block material: Compacted graphite iron
- Cylinder head material: Aluminum alloy
- Valvetrain: 16-valve, OHV, two-valves per cylinder

Combustion
- Fuel system: Electronic Port Fuel Injection (EFI)
- Management: Holley 554-132
- Fuel type: E15 Ethanol provided by Sunoco (2018–present)
- Oil system: Dry sump

Output
- Power output: 650-700+ hp (410-708 kW) @ 9,000 rpm (depending on displacement.)
- Torque output: Approx. 500 lb⋅ft (678 N⋅m) @ 7,500 rpm

Dimensions
- Dry weight: 450 lb (204 kg)

The Ilmor NT1 engine is a 5.87-liter, naturally aspirated, V8 racing engine, developed and produced by Ilmor for competition in the NASCAR Craftsman Truck Series in 2018 it is currently used in the series as a spec engine used by all teams.

== Specifications ==
- Engine type: Ilmor V8
- Capacity: 6.49 L (396 cu in)
- HP rating (superspeedway / intermediate / dirt / road-street course / short tracks): 650 hp (485 kW) / 700 hp (522 kW) (2026 rules package)
- Max. RPM: 10,500 rpm
- Weight: 450 lbs. (450 kg)
- Oil system: Dry-sump lubrication
- Camshafts: Solid-roller camshaft
- Valve actuation: Shaft-mounted
- Valve springs: Wire-type
- Cylinder head: 2 valves (titanium) per cylinder
- Fuel injection: Holley/Bosch 8x high pressure port injectors
- Fuel: E15 Ethanol provided by Sunoco (2018–present)
- Lubricants: 0w grade; Mobil 1 Extended Performance (ESP), Pennzoil Platinum, Valvoline Advanced Protection
- Block material: Compacted graphite iron
- Head material: Aluminum alloy
- Crankshaft: Billet steel
- Con rods: Forged steel
- Pistons: Forged aluminum alloy
- Intake systems: Single plenum - aluminum
- Electronic control unit: Holley 554-132
- Engine service life: 1,500 miles
- Gearbox: H-pattern

=== Applications ===
- NASCAR Craftsman Truck Series (2018–present)
