= Frank Vessels =

Off-road truck racer

Frank "Scoop" Vessels III (1952 – August 11, 2010) was an American off-road truck racer, winner of the 1977 Baja 1000 desert off-road race. He was sponsored by BFGoodrich Tires. Vessels was a participant in the formation of the NASCAR Craftsman Truck Series in 1994.

Vessels earned the nickname "Scoop" from hanging around his grandfather's horse stalls as a kid.

== Off-road racing ==
Vessels attained more than thirty off-road victories throughout his career, with at least one in every major off-road event. He was a four-time SCORE class champion. In 1974 Frank was named the "SCORE Rookie of the Year," and the "Off-Roadsman of the Year" by SCORE International in 1978. One of his most important wins was at the 1977 Baja 1000. He won the event again in 1988.

== Sponsors ==
BFGoodrich sponsored Vessels beginning in 1977, when it to help develop its new radial truck tires. He helped BFGoodrich develop other off-road tires such as the Radial T/A. With these new developments, off-road racing was able to move away from using tractor tires to using tires specifically designed for off-road racing.

== Vessels' 1977 truck ==
The truck Vessels used for his 1977 win was a 1972 Ford F-100 built for him in 1976 by Bill Stroppe. The truck had a one-of-a-kind propane engine with an Impco fuel system. The truck was eventually sold by Vessels after years of racing. To help celebrate BFGoodrich's 20th anniversary in off-road racing, the company found and restored the truck for the 2005 SEMA Show in Las Vegas.

== NASCAR Craftsman Truck Series ==
Several enthusiasts had the idea that led to the creation of the NASCAR Craftsman Truck Series, including Vessels. The intent was to expand the scope of truck racing. The first NASCAR-style truck made its appearance in 1994 at the Daytona 500. The Series was initially called the Super Truck Series but the name was changed in 1996.

== Quarter horses ==
Vessels was also a breeder of American Quarter Horses. He was the president of the American Quarter Horse Association from 2004–2005, and was a past president of the California Thoroughbred Breeders Association. He ran the Vessels Stallion Farm for more than 20 years. The Vessels Stallion Farm logo appeared on the side of many of Frank's early trucks.

Frank's grandfather, Frank Vessels Sr. was a prominent figure in American Quarter horse racing, and was the founder of the Los Alamitos Race Course, in Cypress, California. Frank Sr. was inducted into the American Quarter Horse Hall of Fame in 1989.

== Death ==
Vessels died on August 11, 2010, when the Aero Commander 500 airplane he was piloting crashed just outside Burns, Oregon. Vessels and one passenger were killed. He was 58 years old at the time of his death.
