= NASCAR Truck Series =

Pickup truck racing series

NASCAR FedEx Freight Truck Series
- Category: Stock cars, pickup truck racing
- Country: United States
- Inaugural season: 1995
- Manufacturers: Chevrolet · Ford · Ram · Toyota
- Engine suppliers: Ilmor (NT1)
- Tire suppliers: Goodyear
- Drivers' champion: Kaden Honeycutt
- Makes' champion: Ford
- Teams' champion: Tricon Garage
- Official website: NASCAR Craftsman Truck Series

The NASCAR Truck Series, officially known as NASCAR FedEx Freight Truck Series (NFFTS) for sponsorship reasons, is a pickup truck racing series owned and operated by the National Association for Stock Car Auto Racing (NASCAR). It is the lowest of the company's three national divisions, behind the NASCAR Cup Series and NASCAR O'Reilly Auto Parts Series; the only NASCAR series to race production pickup truck-based stock cars; and as of 2025, the most recently established NASCAR-sanctioned national racing competition.

== History ==
=== Craftsman Truck Series (1995–2008, 2023–2026) ===
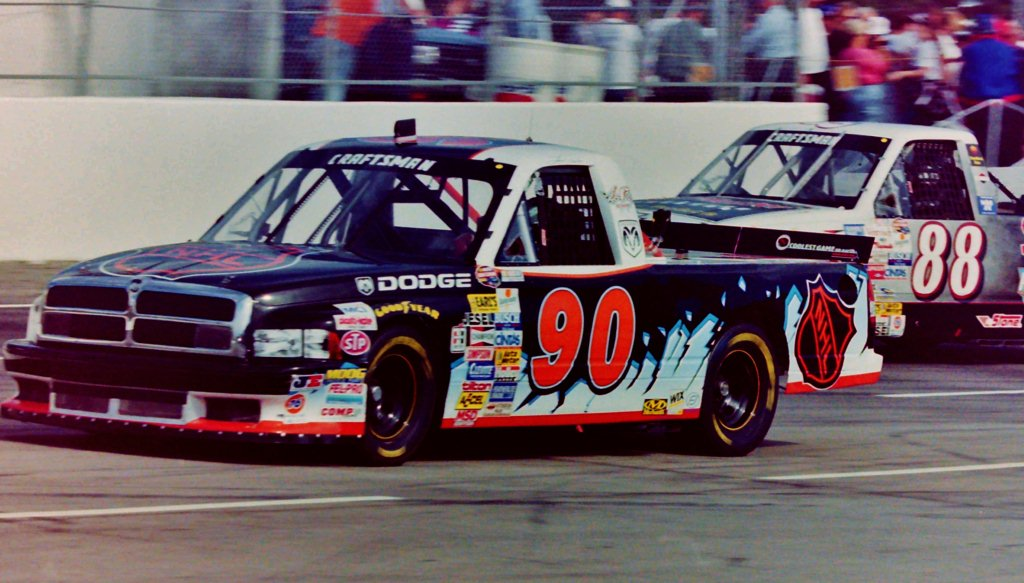
The trucks of Lance Norick (No. 90) and Terry Cook (No. 88) racing in 1998

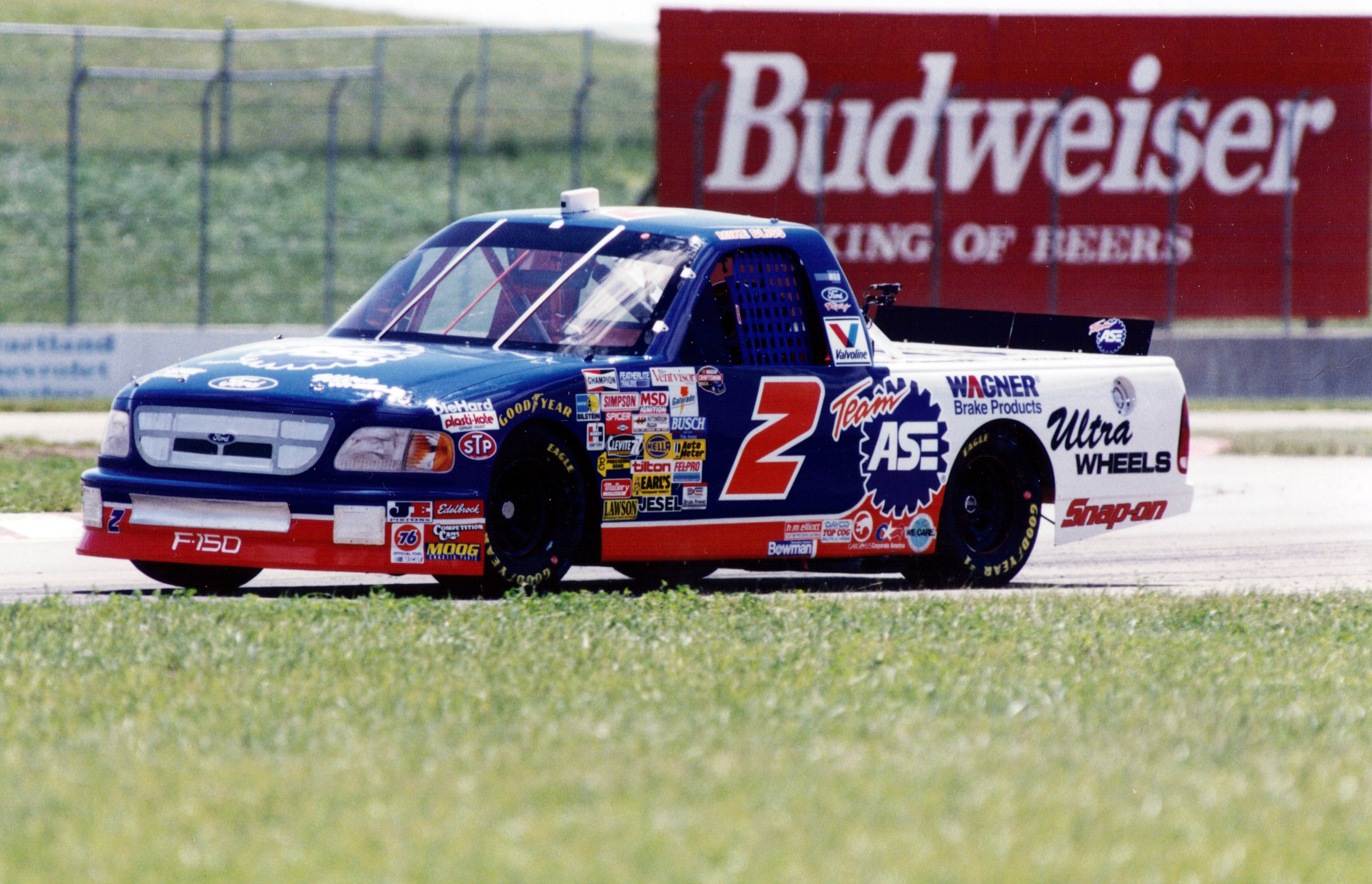
Ford F-150

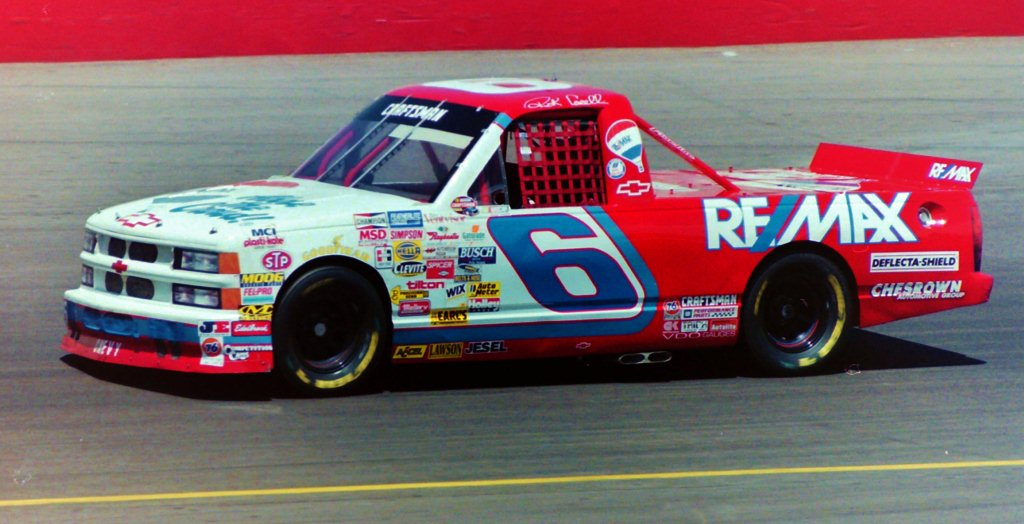
Chevrolet C/K

The idea for the Truck Series dates to 1991. A group of SCORE off-road racers (Dick Landfield, Jimmy Smith, Jim Venable, and Frank "Scoop" Vessels) had concerns about desert racing's future, and decided to create a pavement truck racing series. They visited NASCAR Western Operations Vice President Ken Clapp to promote the idea, who consulted Bill France Jr. with it, but the plans fell apart. Afterwards, Clapp told the four to build a truck before NASCAR considered it. Bakersfield fabricator Gary Collins built a prototype truck, which was first shown off during Speedweeks for the 1994 Daytona 500 and tested by truck owner Jim Smith around Daytona International Speedway. The truck proved to be popular among fans, and NASCAR arranged a meeting in a Burbank, California hotel on April 11, 1994; the meeting ultimately led to the creation of the "SuperTruck Series".

Four demonstration races were held at Mesa Marin Raceway, Portland Speedway, Saugus Speedway and Tucson Raceway Park. Tucson held four events that winter, which were nationally televised during the Winter Heat Series coverage. Sears, Roebuck, & Co., through the Craftsman brand, served as the sponsor of the series on a three-year deal, and the series was renamed to the Craftsman Truck Series in 1996. In addition, the series' $580,000 purse is larger than the Busch Grand National Series' fund. While a new series, it garnered immediate support from many prominent Winston Cup Series team owners and drivers. Prominent Cup owners Richard Childress, Rick Hendrick, and Jack Roush owned truck teams, and top drivers such as Dale Earnhardt and Ernie Irvan also fielded SuperTrucks for others. The series also attracted the attention of drivers like sprint car racing star Sammy Swindell, Walker Evans of off-road racing fame, open-wheel veteran and later long-time NASCAR driver Mike Bliss, and Atlanta Falcons head coach Jerry Glanville. The inaugural race, the Skoal Bandit Copper World Classic at Phoenix International Raceway, was held on February 5; the race, featuring an event-record crowd of 38,000 spectators, concluded with eventual series champion Mike Skinner holding off Cup veteran Terry Labonte to win. Only one team from the first season of the series, FDNY Racing, is still racing in the series today.

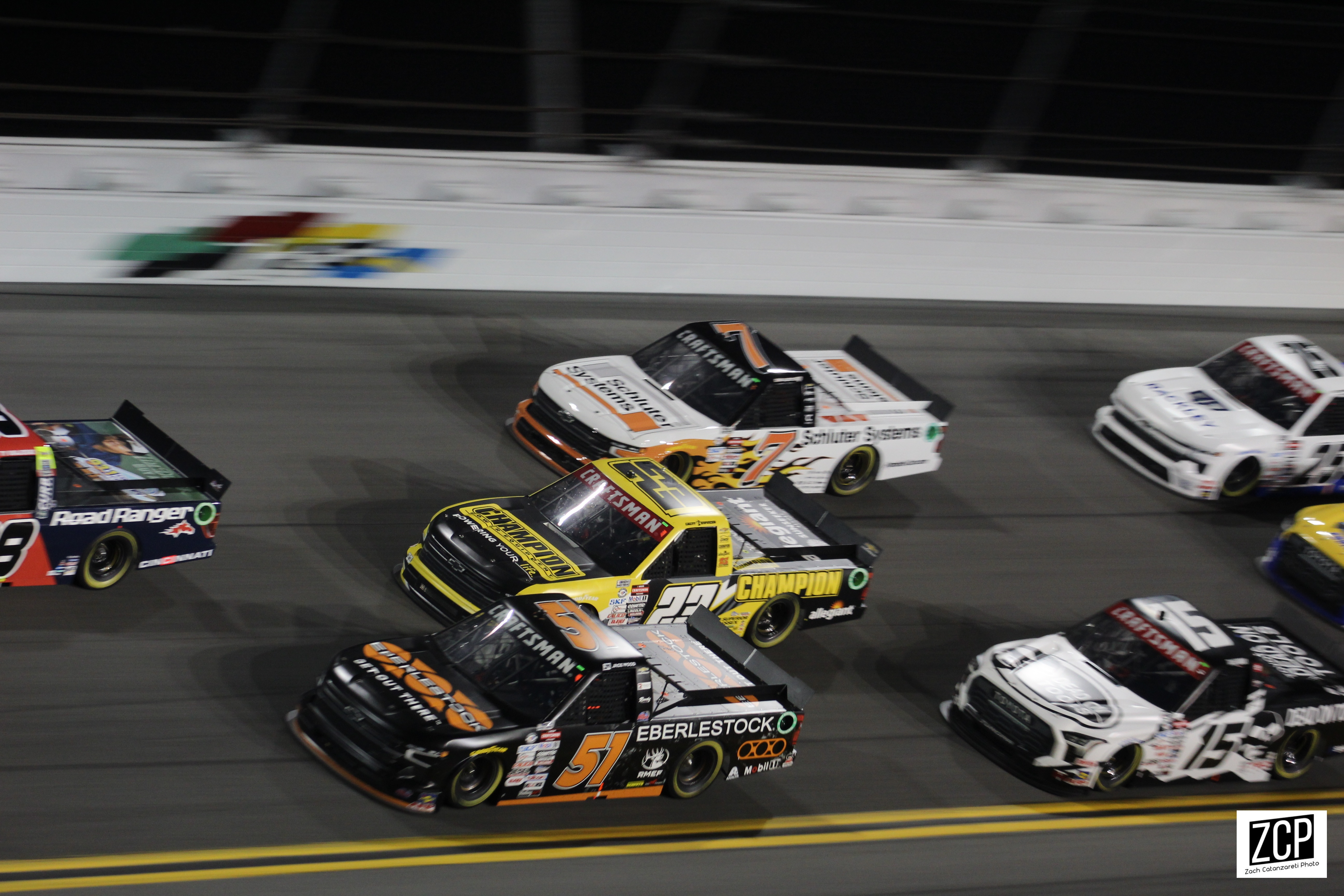
2023 NextEra Energy 250, first race since 2008 under Craftsman sponsorship

On August 26, 2022, NASCAR announced a multi-year sponsorship deal with Stanley Black & Decker – which had acquired the Craftsman brand from Sears in 2017 – under which the series would return to being known as the Craftsman Truck Series beginning in 2023. As part of the deal, Stanley Black & Decker also became the official tool brand of NASCAR.

=== Camping World and Gander Outdoors Truck Series (2009–2022) ===
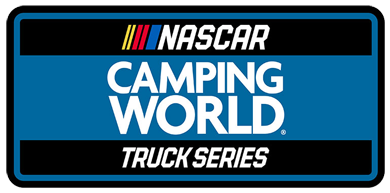
Logo of NASCAR Camping World Truck series from 2009 to 2022

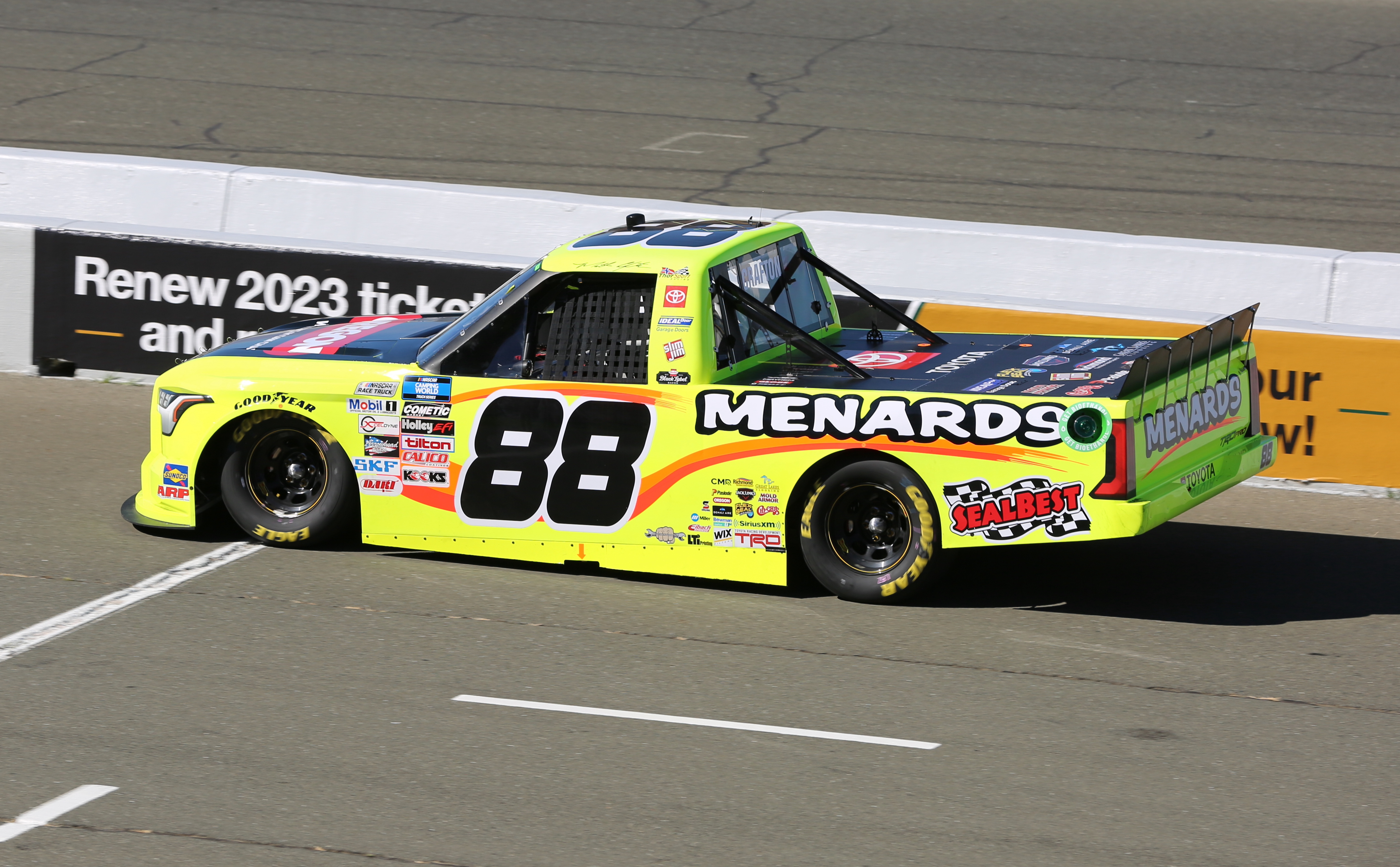
The Camping World Truck Series vehicle of the three-time series champion Matt Crafton

At the end of the 2008 NASCAR Craftsman Truck Series schedule, Craftsman ended its sponsorship of the series. Subsequently, Camping World signed a seven-year contract with NASCAR, rebranding the series as the Camping World Truck Series.

With decreasing money and increasing costs, the series has struggled financially with sponsorship and prize money, the latter often being low, while the former would prompt teams to shut down to reduce in size. Teams like Richard Childress Racing, a Cup team with 31 Truck wins, shut down their Truck operations; in RCR's case, after the 2013 season. After the 2014 season, Brad Keselowski stated his Brad Keselowski Racing team had lost $1 million despite recording a win that year, and told the Sporting News: "The truck series, you have to be able to lose money on a constant basis. That's just how the system works." BKR ended up shutting down after the 2017 season. To cut costs, NASCAR required teams to use sealed engines, with teams not being allowed to run at most three races with a previously used engine. Additionally, NASCAR reduced the maximum number of pit crew members allowed over the wall for a pit stop from seven to five, and required teams to only take either fuel or tires on a single pit stop in 2009. This requirement was abandoned for the 2010 season.

Starting with the 2011 season, NASCAR implemented a new rule that allows drivers to compete for the drivers' championship in only one of the three national touring series (Cup, O'Reilly Auto Parts, or Truck) in a given season. On January 19, 2016, NASCAR announced the introduction of a playoff format similar to the NASCAR Cup Series Chase for the Championship: the format consists of eight drivers across three rounds, with two drivers being eliminated after each round. Starting in 2020 season, the playoff was expanded to 10 drivers, with two being eliminated after the first round and four being eliminated after the second round.

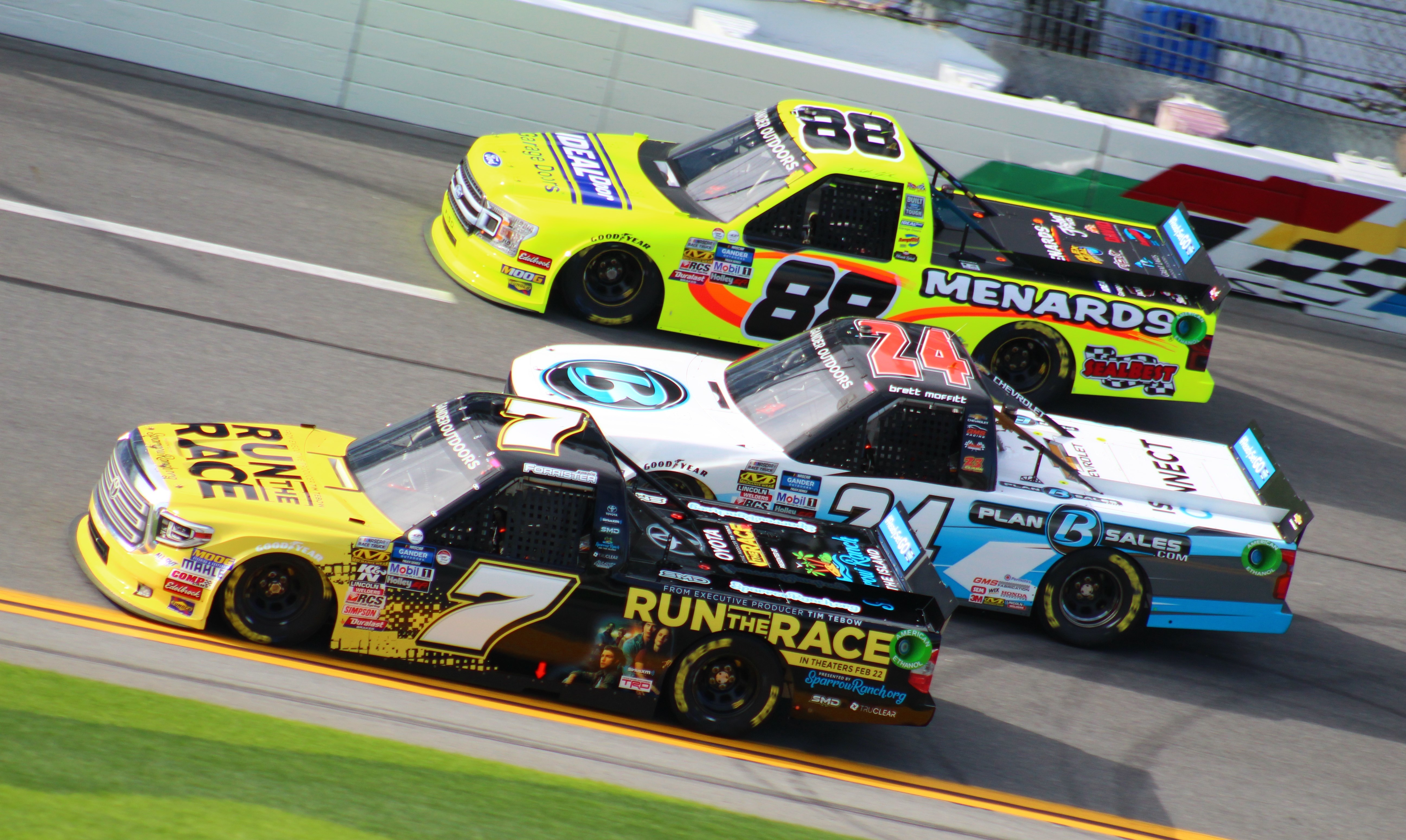
2019 NextEra Energy 250, first race under Gander Outdoors sponsorship

Camping World signed a seven-year extension in 2014 to remain the title sponsor of the Truck Series until at least 2022. On May 8, 2018, NASCAR and Camping World announced the Truck Series' title sponsorship would be switched to its subsidiary Gander Outdoors starting in 2019, renaming it the Gander Outdoors Truck Series. The series was slightly renamed to the Gander RV & Outdoors Truck Series in 2020, but returned to the Camping World Truck Series branding the following season.

=== FedEx Freight Truck Series (2027) ===
On September 17, 2026, it was announced that FedEx Freight would become the new series sponsor, replacing Craftsman.

== Drivers ==
Most of the first drivers in the series were veteran short track drivers who had not made it or struggled to thrive in the other NASCAR national series; for example, 1991 Featherlite Southwest Tour champion Rick Carelli had failed to qualify twelve times for Cup races across 1991-1994, with only nine career Cup starts, but he finished sixth in the inaugural Truck Series championship. It is worth noting that most of the early champions have become NASCAR Cup Series regulars later in their careers, such as 1995 champion Skinner, who joined Richard Childress Racing's Cup team in 1997, competing on a full-time basis until 2003. Professional football coach Jerry Glanville was among the series' first drivers. As the years went on, a number of younger drivers debuted in the series, using the series as a springboard for their racing careers. NASCAR stars Greg Biffle, Kevin Harvick, Jamie McMurray, Kurt Busch, Carl Edwards, and Kyle Busch each started in the series.

A 2001 Truck Series race incident resulted in a significant NASCAR rule change. In early November of that year, the Truck Series was running as a support race for CART's Marlboro 500, that series' final event of its season; since the race weekend was being staged by CART and not NASCAR, its rules had to be followed. As a result, the Tobacco Master Settlement Agreement was effective. Thus, any driver who participated in the race weekend had to be at least 18 years of age. The rule affected Roush Racing's No. 99 truck driven by Kyle Busch, as he was underage at the time (16) and thus disqualified from the event despite having already qualified. The issue resulted in a 2002 rule change that mandated that any driver competing in a NASCAR national touring series (Truck, O'Reilly, Cup) or any regional series race on the weekend of a national series race must be at least 18 in order to comply with the Master Settlement Agreement. After NASCAR phased out tobacco sponsorships, the minimum age for regional touring series was changed to 16, and the Truck Series' rule regulated a minimum age of 16 for any oval circuit two kilometers (1.25 miles) or shorter or road courses, with a rule of 18 for ovals 1.33 miles or longer.

In later years, though, the Truck Series has also become a place for Cup veterans without a ride to make their living which included Ricky Craven, Jimmy Spencer, Dennis Setzer, Brendan Gaughan (who started his career in a family-owned team, and after his Nextel Cup attempt, returned to the family operation), Rich Bickle, Andy Houston, Todd Bodine, Bobby Hamilton Jr. and previous champions Johnny Benson, Mike Skinner, Ron Hornaday, Ted Musgrave, and Jack Sprague. Older drivers dominated the series, most with O'Reilly Auto Parts and Cup Series experience: in 2007, all the top-10 drivers were over 30 years of age, and 7 of the 10 had Cup experience, as did every race winner except Erik Darnell. Even though novice drivers play a minimal role in this "minor league" series, there is no controversy like the disputes over "Buschwhackers" in the Busch (later Nationwide, then Xfinity Series, now O'Reilly Auto Parts Series). No current Cup regulars drive a full Truck Series schedule, although Cup driver Kevin Harvick owned his own team in the series until 2011, Brad Keselowski owned his own team until he announced its cessation of operations in 2017. A current Truck Series field could be split into three groups: Cup drivers that compete as owner-drivers like Busch, or to receive additional money like David Gilliland; Truck regulars who compete full-time in the series; and young drivers who use the Truck Series to enter NASCAR.

== Racing and strategy ==
=== Qualifying ===
A Truck Series field currently consists of 36 trucks in races with qualifying. Previously, 32 trucks comprised a field, but due to the COVID-19 pandemic, the field was increased to 36 in races with qualifying and 40 without to accommodate as many trucks as possible.

For most races, a single-truck qualifying format is used. For tracks 1.25 miles and shorter, each truck gets two laps with the fastest lap counting. At tracks longer than 1.25 miles each truck only gets one timed lap. Road course events use a 2 part knockout qualifying format similar to Formula 1, with the top 12 qualifiers from Q1 advancing to Q2. At the event at Eldora, qualifying sets the lineups for a series of heat races which then determines the lineup.

=== The race ===
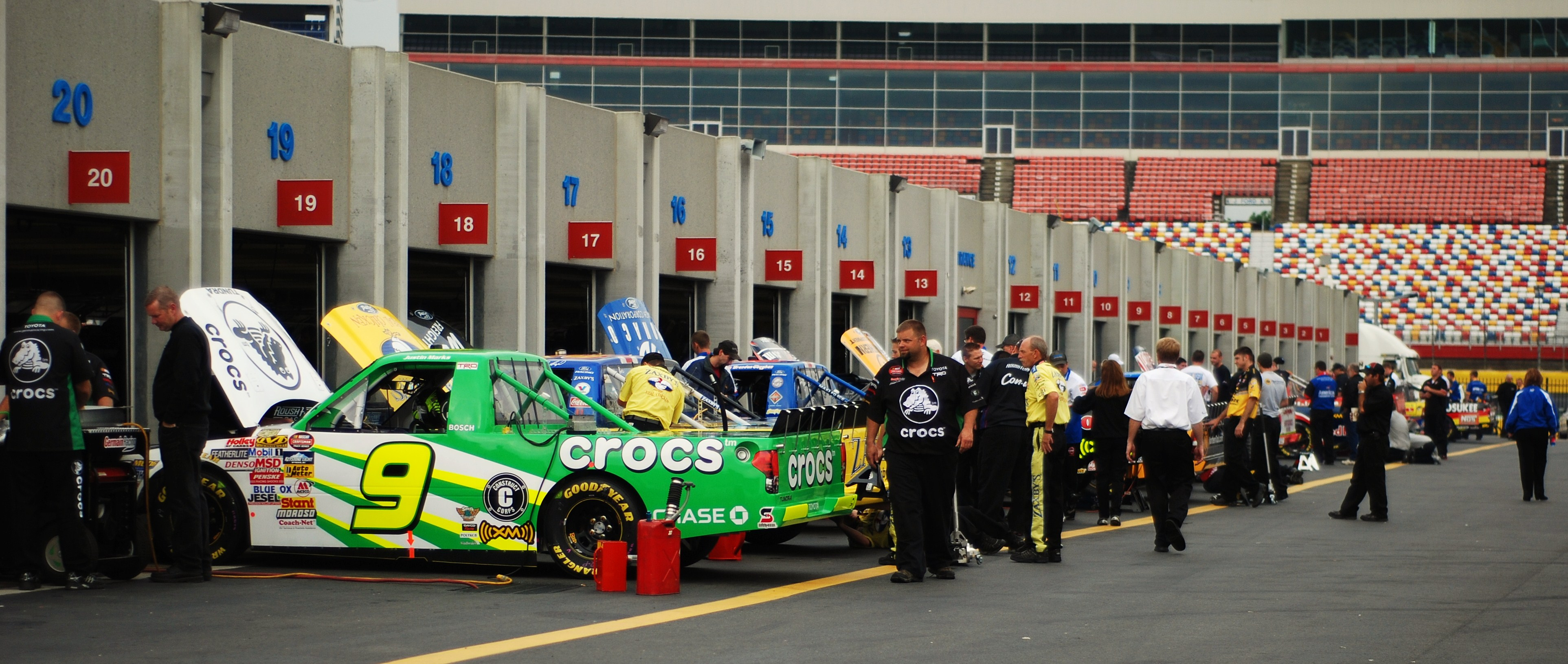
A Truck Series garage at Lowe's Motor Speedway in 2008

Initially, the series used a number of rules that differed from both Winston Cup and Busch Grand National Series racing. Most of the first races were no longer than 125 miles in length, with many being 150-lap races on short tracks. To save teams money by not requiring teams to hire pit specialists and buy extra tires, and because some tracks - Saugus Speedway, Flemington Raceway, Tucson Raceway Park, Evergreen Speedway and Colorado National Speedway most notably - did not have a pit road safe enough for pit stops, or had pits outside the track, starting with the second race of the series in Tucson, NASCAR adopted a five-minute "halftime" break, in place of pit stops, where teams could make any changes they would want to the truck. The only time tire changes were possible were for the interest of safety, such as a tire failure, or a danger to the tire. The rule was popular with television and fans, and was spread for the entire schedule afterwards as pit reporters could interview drivers and crew chiefs for the break in a time without stress. However, starting in 1998, NASCAR introduced competition cautions, with each team being awarded four sets of tires; with this rule change, the halftime break was abolished starting with the race at Pikes Peak International Raceway. In 1999, full pit stops were added, with drivers being allowed to pit during races, but were not allowed to change more than two tires during a stop.

In 1996, some races went to two intermissions for full tire and fuel stops, while longer races were stopped at three times - a limited break near the one-quarter and three-quarter marks for fuel stops, and at the halfway point for fuel and tire stops. If tire wear was a concern, NASCAR also permitted two-tire changes if necessary in the first and third period breaks. These rules were influential in driver development. Drivers had to learn to conserve tire wear for up to a half race, which allowed them to learn conserving the truck. Some drivers used the rules to learn tire conservation for other series. In 1997, NASCAR started phasing pit stops. During the 1997 season, trucks could only legally take fuel and make adjustments during pit stops during the race. Tire changes were still illegal except for emergency causes and at break times.

For a short time in 1995, NASCAR adopted traditional short-track rules by inverting a number of cars at the front of the grid after complaints about some races where drivers led the entire event. That was dropped quickly after some races ended as walkovers for drivers, leading entire races.

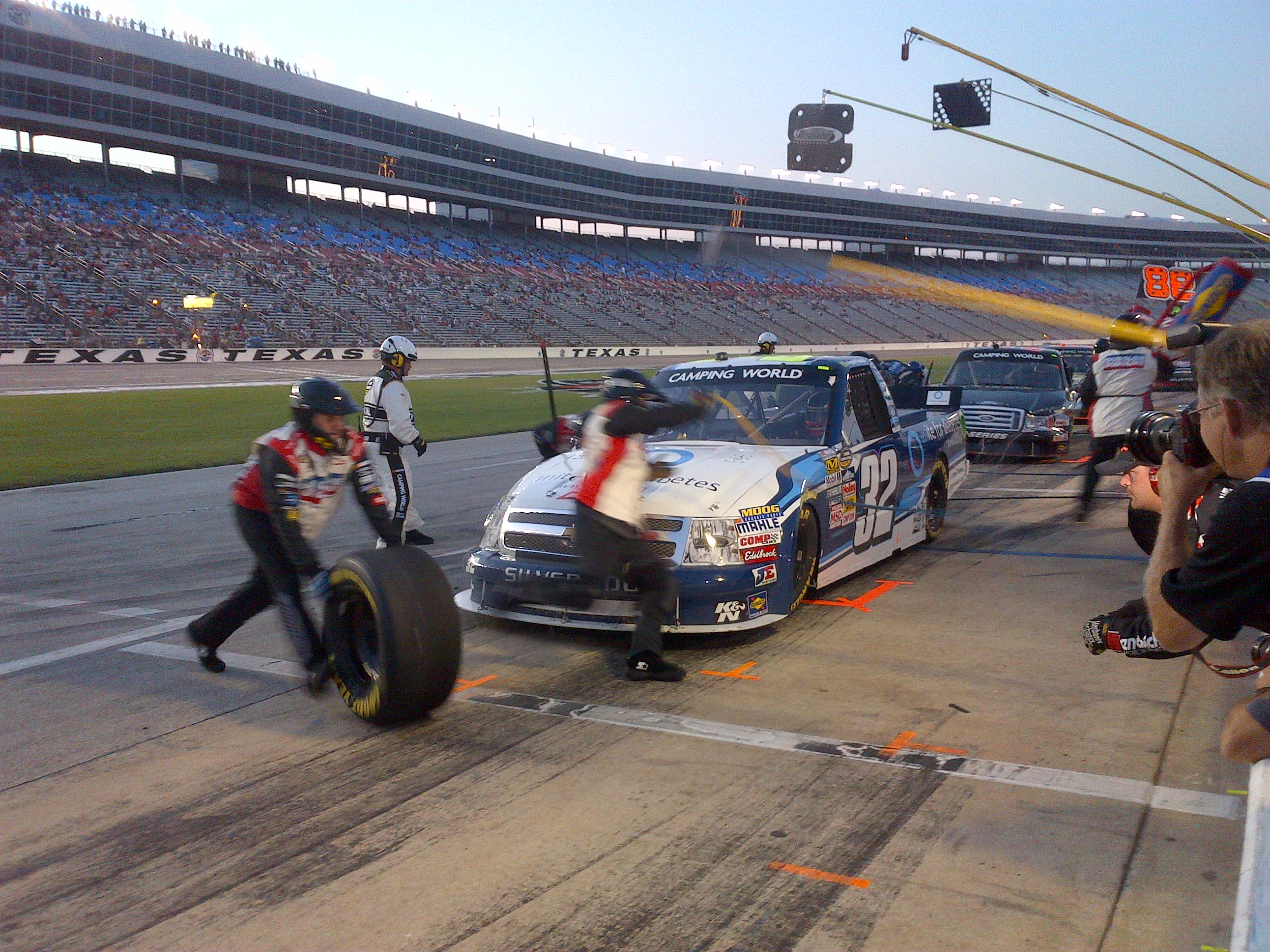
Miguel Paludo's team performs a pit stop at Texas Motor Speedway in 2012

A more popular rule that was effective until the middle of the 2004 season was the "overtime" rule. Unless interrupted by weather, Craftsman Truck Series races had to end under green flag conditions, and the rule mandated that all races must end with a minimum of two consecutive laps in green flag condition, often referred to as a "green-white-checkered" finish. Since racing to the yellow flag was prohibited until 1998 (and again in 2003 under the current free pass rule), scoring reverted to the last completed lap, and until racing back to the line was legalized in 1998, if the yellow waved during the first lap of a green-white-checkered finish, the entire situation would be reset. This rule meant some races would be greatly extended. In 1998, a CBS-televised race in Pikes Peak scheduled for 186 laps ran 198 laps (12 extra laps) because of multiple attempts, and the last such race, in Gateway International Raceway in 2004, lasted 14 additional laps (16.25 miles). A July 24, 2004 rule change for NASCAR's three national series meant only one "green-white-checkered" finish can be attempted, and the race can end under yellow in one of four situations—inclement weather, darkness, the yellow flag waving because of an incident during the final lap of a race, or the yellow flag waving after the one attempt at green-white-checkered begins. This was later extended by NASCAR to three attempts. (Although reducing the Truck Series attempts at a green-white-checkered finish to one, the rule change was part of NASCAR's implementation of the rule to the Cup and Busch Series due to complaints regarding NASCAR's policy at the time regarding late race cautions; the policy stated that a red flag would be thrown during a late race caution to attempt to ensure the race would finish under green but if a caution occurred after the window for the red flag, the race would end under caution regardless of where the incident occurred or how severe it was). Ironically, the first Truck Series race under the new rules ended with a yellow flag on the final lap.

In 2014, NASCAR banned tandem drafting, a method of racing in which two vehicles would line up with each other to gain speed, from the Truck Series. Drivers who commit the act are black-flagged.

In the 2016 season, the Truck Series experimented with a rule similar to those used in longer-distance Super Late Model events such as the Snowball Derby that limited how long a race can go before a competition caution for pit stops or adjustments in an effort to reduce green-flag pit stops, with which younger and more inexperienced drivers were unfamiliar. The limit was 20 minutes of green flag racing (in theory 75 laps at Bristol, or 60 laps at Martinsville), without beneficiaries being awarded. Upon each restart, the clock restarted from 20:00, and each caution for an incident reset the clock back to 20:00. As is the case in the short track rules, no competition caution would be used in the final 20 laps, except for tracks where lap times are 50 seconds or greater (Pocono or Mosport), where the limit was ten laps, or Eldora because of its format. In 2017, this was replaced with the stage system adopted by all other NASCAR national series that season.

== Tracks ==
NASCAR Truck tracks in 2027
Points paying races

Initially, the Truck Series competed primarily on short tracks and tracks in the Western United States; the series' inaugural schedule included races at tracks in Arizona, California, Colorado, Oregon and Washington, with only five races in the Southeastern U.S., such as Louisville Motor Speedway, which was not run by the Cup Series. Additionally, the longest tracks run by the series, Phoenix International Raceway and Milwaukee Mile, were one mile long. By 1998, most of the short tracks were phased out in favor of speedways of 1 to 2 miles in length, and more of the races were held at tracks that hosted Cup and Busch events concurrently, but some races were held with CART and Indy Racing League events. Road courses were phased out by 2001, the last race being in 2000 at Watkins Glen International, but returned in 2013 with the Truck race at Canadian Tire Motorsport Park. Also in 2013, the Truck Series began racing at Eldora Speedway, the first time NASCAR had raced at a dirt track since the 1970 NASCAR Grand National Series season.

== Television and radio ==
The 1995 season's races were nationally televised on ESPN, TNN, ABC and CBS. Of the 20-race schedule, TNN aired ten races, while ESPN aired seven races and CBS two, while ABC aired the race at Mesa Marin Speedway as part of its Wide World of Sports program. In 2001, NASCAR moved the series exclusively to cable, first with ESPN, and in 2003, switched to Speed, a network which provided supplemental coverage for Fox's coverage of NASCAR events. Network television returned to the series from 2007 to 2010 when two races per season (the Kroger 250 at Martinsville and the City of Mansfield 250 at Mansfield, with a race at Fontana replacing Mansfield) airing on Fox as NASCAR on Fox events. These broadcasts were discontinued in 2009.

On August 13, 2013, Speed was converted into Fox Sports 1 (FS1), continuing with all Truck Series race broadcasts, whereas some practice and qualifying sessions were moved to sister channel Fox Sports 2 (FS2). For the 2014 season, the Fred's 250 at Talladega had its race broadcast moved from FS1 to the Fox broadcast network. For the 2018 season, the UNOH 200 at Bristol aired in prime time on Fox. For the 2020 season, the Clean Harbors 200 aired on Fox. In 2022, the CRC Brakleen 150 was moved to Fox. In 2023, the Tyson 250 was moved.

As of the 2025 season, the NASCAR Racing Network, a collaboration of Motor Racing Network and Performance Racing Network using their respective staffs and crews at the tracks where each do NASCAR Cup and O'Reilly series events, has exclusive radio broadcasting rights to the NASCAR Craftsman Truck Series. Distribution is handled by MRN.

== Specifications ==
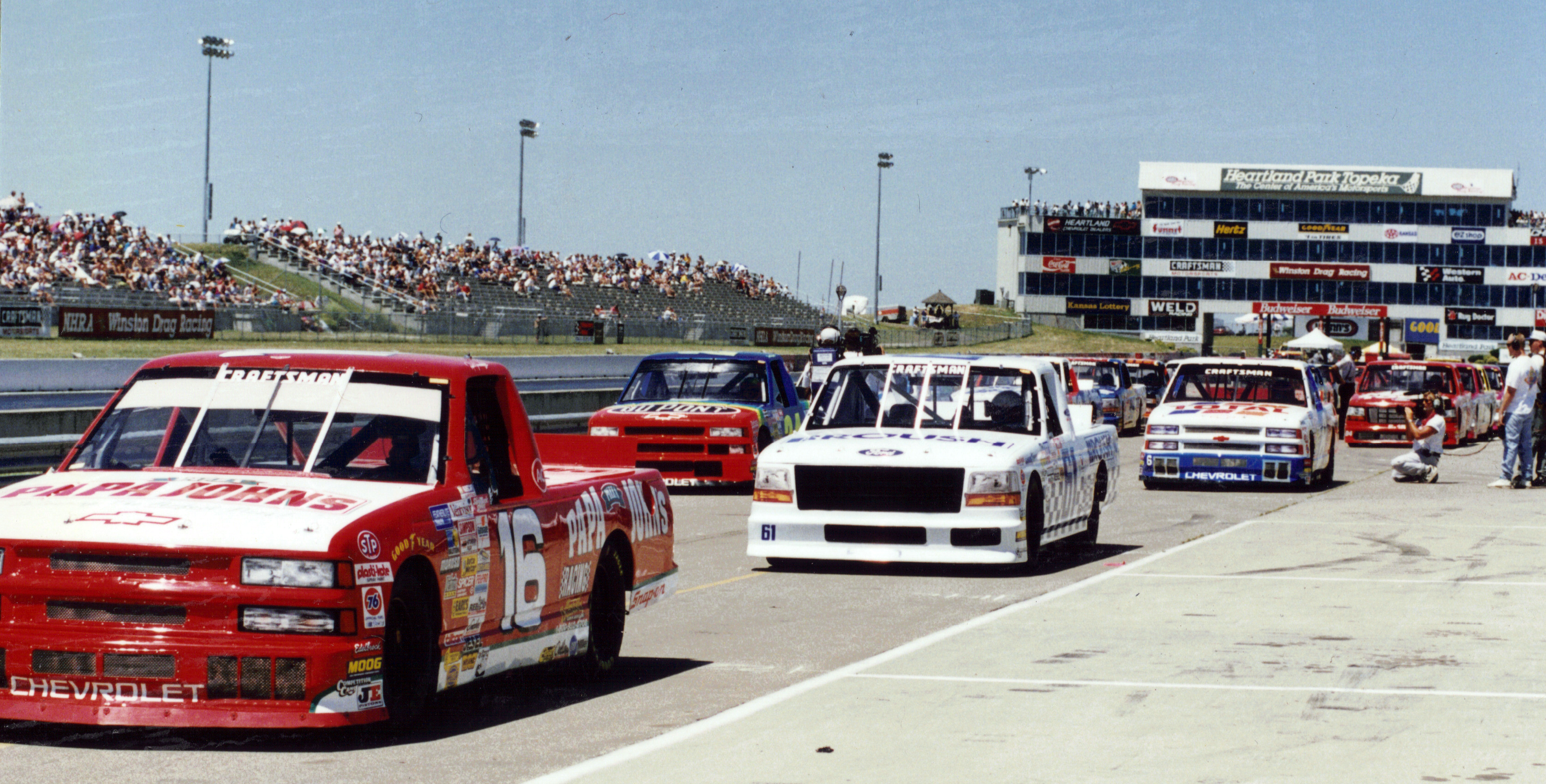
Trucks at Heartland Park Topeka in 1995

- Chassis: Steel tube frame with safety roll cage, must be NASCAR standards
- Engine displacement: 5.86 L (358 cu in) built or 376 cubic inch (6.2 L) Ilmor NT1 crate Pushrod V8
- Transmission: 4-speed manual
- Weight: 3,200 lb (1,451 kg) minimum without driver and fuel; 3,400 lb (1,542 kg) minimum with driver and fuel
- Power output: 650 - 700 hp (480 - 520 kW) unrestricted, - 450 hp (340 kW) restricted
- Torque: 700 N⋅m (520 ft⋅lb)
- Fuel: Sunoco 93 MON, 104 RON, 98 AKI 85% unleaded gasoline + Sunoco Green Ethanol E15 15%
- Fuel capacity: 18 US gallons (68 litres)
- Fuel delivery: Carburetion (built) or Fuel injection (crate)
- Compression ratio: 12:1
- Aspiration: Naturally aspirated
- Carburetor size: 390 cubic feet per minute (184 litres per second) 4 barrel (built)
- Wheelbase: 112 in (2,845 mm)
- Steering: Power, recirculating ball
- Tires: Slick and rain tires (shorter flat ovals and all road courses only if in case of rainy conditions) provided by Goodyear Eagle
- Length: 206.5 in (5,245 mm)
- Height: 60 in (1,524 mm)
- Width: 80 in (2,032 mm)
- Safety equipment: HANS device, seat belt 6-point supplied by Willans

== Manufacturer representation ==
The series was notable in seeing the return of Chrysler Corporation factory-supported race vehicles to the tracks. Chrysler withdrew its factory support of its Dodge and Plymouth brands after the 1972 season to cut costs, though teams continued to campaign cars with Plymouth and Dodge sheetmetal and power plants until 1985. Chrysler funded a small R&D effort, with factory funding and support for Dodge to return to NASCAR for the Craftsman Truck Series with the Dodge Ram pickup truck in 1997. By 2001 Dodge made a full-time return to NASCAR with a full factory-backed effort. While Dodge continued to race in the other series until 2012, the Ram Trucks division (spun off from Dodge after the Fiat Group took control of Chrysler) raced in the Camping World Truck Series in Dodge's place. In 2013, Ram pulled out, leaving the Nationwide Series as the last series with teams fielding Dodge at the time. In June 2025, Ram announced it would return to the Craftsman Truck Series in 2026, ahead of a possible return to the Cup Series in 2027 or 2028.

The Truck Series was the first major NASCAR series to feature Toyota, with the Toyota Tundra model making its debut in the series in 2004; Toyota had previously competed in the mostly regional level Goody's Dash Series. The Japanese automaker became the first foreign nameplate to race in NASCAR during the sport's modern era. Toyota would later join the Cup series and Xfinity series as well, doing so in 2007.

FCA US (Chrysler)
- Dodge Ram: 1995–2012 (no factory support after 2009)
- Ram: 2010–2016 (no factory support after 2012); 2026–present

Ford
- Ford F-150: 1995–present

General Motors
- Chevrolet C/K: 1995–1997
- Chevrolet Silverado: 1998–present

Toyota
- Toyota Tundra: 2004–present

Manufacturer	Chassis	Debut	Image
Chevrolet	C/K	1995	
Chevrolet	Silverado	1998	
Dodge	Ram	1995	
Ford	F-150	1995	
Ram	1500	2010	
Toyota	Tundra	2004	

== Seasons ==
Year	Races	Champion	Manufacturers' Champion	Owners' Champion	Rookie of the Year	Most Popular Driver
SuperTruck Series
1995	20	Mike Skinner	Chevrolet	No. 3 Richard Childress Racing	Not awarded in first season	Butch Miller
Craftsman Truck Series
1996	24	Ron Hornaday Jr.	Chevrolet	No. 16 Dale Earnhardt, Inc.	Bryan Reffner	Jimmy Hensley
1997	26	Jack Sprague	Chevrolet	No. 24 Hendrick Motorsports	Kenny Irwin Jr.	Ron Hornaday Jr.
1998	27	Ron Hornaday Jr. (2)	Chevrolet	No. 16 Dale Earnhardt, Inc. (2)	Greg Biffle	Stacy Compton
1999	25	Jack Sprague (2)	Ford	No. 24 Hendrick Motorsports (2)	Mike Stefanik	Dennis Setzer
2000	24	Greg Biffle	Ford (2)	No. 50 Roush Racing	**Kurt Busch**	Greg Biffle
2001	24	Jack Sprague (3)	Dodge	No. 24 Hendrick Motorsports (3)	Travis Kvapil	Joe Ruttman
2002	22	Mike Bliss	Chevrolet	No. 16 Xpress Motorsports	Brendan Gaughan	David Starr
2003	25	Travis Kvapil	Dodge	No. 16 Xpress Motorsports (2)	Carl Edwards	Brendan Gaughan
2004	25	Bobby Hamilton	Dodge (3)	No. 4 Bobby Hamilton Racing	David Reutimann	Steve Park
2005	25	Ted Musgrave	Chevrolet	No. 1 Ultra Motorsports	Todd Kluever	Ron Hornaday Jr. (2)
2006	25	Todd Bodine	Toyota	No. 30 Germain Racing	Erik Darnell	Johnny Benson Jr.
2007	25	Ron Hornaday Jr. (3)	Toyota	No. 33 Kevin Harvick Incorporated	Willie Allen	Johnny Benson Jr. (2)
2008	25	Johnny Benson Jr.	Toyota	No. 23 Bill Davis Racing	Colin Braun	Johnny Benson Jr. (3)
Camping World Truck Series
2009	25	Ron Hornaday Jr. (4)	Toyota	No. 33 Kevin Harvick Incorporated (2)	Johnny Sauter	Ricky Carmichael
2010	25	Todd Bodine (2)	Toyota	No. 18 Kyle Busch Motorsports	Austin Dillon	Narain Karthikeyan
2011	25	Austin Dillon	Chevrolet	No. 2 Kevin Harvick Incorporated (3)	Joey Coulter	Austin Dillon
2012	22	James Buescher	Chevrolet	No. 31 Turner Scott Motorsports	Ty Dillon	Nelson Piquet Jr.
2013	22	Matt Crafton	Toyota	No. 51 Kyle Busch Motorsports (2)	**Ryan Blaney**	Ty Dillon
2014	22	Matt Crafton (2)	Toyota	No. 51 Kyle Busch Motorsports (3)	Ben Kennedy	**Ryan Blaney**
2015	23	Erik Jones	Toyota	No. 4 Kyle Busch Motorsports (4)	Erik Jones	John Hunter Nemechek
2016	23	Johnny Sauter	Toyota	No. 9 Kyle Busch Motorsports (5)	William Byron	Tyler Reddick
2017	23	Christopher Bell	Toyota	No. 4 Kyle Busch Motorsports (6)	Chase Briscoe	Chase Briscoe
2018	23	Brett Moffitt	Chevrolet	No. 16 Hattori Racing Enterprises	Myatt Snider	Noah Gragson
Gander Outdoors Truck Series
2019	23	Matt Crafton (3)	Toyota	No. 51 Kyle Busch Motorsports (7)	Tyler Ankrum	Ross Chastain
Gander RV & Outdoors Truck Series
2020	23	Sheldon Creed	Chevrolet	No. 2 GMS Racing	Zane Smith	Zane Smith
Camping World Truck Series
2021	22	Ben Rhodes	Toyota	No. 99 ThorSport Racing	Chandler Smith	Hailie Deegan
2022	23	Zane Smith	Toyota (13)	No. 38 Front Row Motorsports	Corey Heim	Hailie Deegan (2)
Craftsman Truck Series
2023	23	Ben Rhodes (2)	Chevrolet (11)	No. 99 ThorSport Racing (2)	Nick Sanchez	Hailie Deegan (3)
2024	23	Ty Majeski	Chevrolet (12)	No. 98 ThorSport Racing (3)	Layne Riggs	Rajah Caruth
2025	25	Corey Heim	Toyota (14)	No. 11 Tricon Garage	Gio Ruggiero	Rajah Caruth (2)
2026	25	Kaden Honeycutt	Ford (3)	No. 11 Tricon Garage (2)	Brenden Queen	Layne Riggs

- Driver in Italics has won at least 1 NASCAR O'Reilly Auto Parts Series championship
- Driver in **Bold** has won at least 1 NASCAR Cup Series championship.

== All-time win table ==
All figures correct as of the 2026 Craftsman 200 at Homestead–Miami Speedway (November 6, 2026).

Key
*	NASCAR Craftsman Truck Series Champion
#	Driver is competing full-time in the 2026 season
°	Driver is competing part-time in the 2026 season
^	Driver has been inducted into the NASCAR Hall of Fame

Rank	Driver	Wins
1	Kyle Busch	69
2	Ron Hornaday Jr. * ^	51
3	Mike Skinner *	28
3	Jack Sprague *	28
5	Corey Heim * °	26
6	Johnny Sauter *	24
7	Todd Bodine *	22
8	Dennis Setzer	18
9	Greg Biffle *	17
9	Ted Musgrave *	17
11	Matt Crafton *	15
12	Johnny Benson Jr. *	14
12	Kevin Harvick ^	14
14	Mike Bliss *	13
14	Grant Enfinger #	13
14	Brett Moffitt *	13
14	John Hunter Nemechek °	13
14	Joe Ruttman	13
19	Layne Riggs #	12
20	Timothy Peters	11
21	Bobby Hamilton *	10
21	Chandler Smith #	10
23	Christian Eckes	9
23	Travis Kvapil *	9
23	Zane Smith *	9
26	Christopher Bell * °	8
26	William Byron	8
26	Sheldon Creed *	8
26	Brendan Gaughan	8
26	Austin Hill	8
31	Austin Dillon *	7
31	Erik Jones *	7
31	Mark Martin ^	7
31	Ben Rhodes * #	7
35	James Buescher *	6
35	Terry Cook	6
35	Carl Edwards ^	6
35	Carson Hocevar °	6
35	Bubba Wallace	6
35	Ty Majeski * #	6
41	Ross Chastain °	5
41	Rick Crawford	5
41	Kaden Honeycutt # *	5
41	Kasey Kahne	5
41	Scott Riggs	5
41	Mike Wallace	5
46	Ryan Blaney	4
46	Kurt Busch ^	4
46	Rick Carelli	4
46	Stewart Friesen #	4
46	Kyle Larson	4
46	Tony Raines	4
46	Jay Sauter	4
46	David Starr	4
55	Rich Bickle	3
55	Clint Bowyer °	3
55	Ty Dillon °	3
55	Chase Elliott	3
55	Todd Gilliland	3
55	Justin Haley #	3
55	Andy Houston	3
55	Parker Kligerman °	3
55	Tyler Reddick	3
55	Dave Rezendes	3
65	Aric Almirola	2
65	Tyler Ankrum #	2
65	Chase Briscoe °	2
65	Rajah Caruth °	2
65	Chad Chaffin	2
65	Stacy Compton	2
65	Cole Custer	2
65	Erik Darnell	2
65	Ron Fellows	2
65	Noah Gragson	2
65	Denny Hamlin	2
65	Jimmy Hensley	2
65	Kenny Irwin Jr.	2
65	Joey Logano	2
65	Nelson Piquet Jr.	2
65	Ryan Preece	2
65	Robert Pressley	2
65	Nick Sanchez °	2
65	Brian Scott	2
65	Tony Stewart ^ °	2
65	Randy Tolsma	2
65	Jon Wood	2
87	Spencer Boyd #	1
87	Colin Braun	1
87	Jeb Burton	1
87	Austin Cindric	1
87	Joey Coulter	1
87	Ricky Craven	1
87	Matt DiBenedetto	1
87	Tate Fogleman	1
87	Cale Gale	1
87	Jake Garcia #	1
87	Kaz Grala	1
87	Daniel Hemric #	1
87	Ricky Hendrick	1
87	Shane Hmiel	1
87	Brandon Jones °	1
87	Ben Kennedy	1
87	Bob Keselowski	1
87	Brad Keselowski	1
87	John King	1
87	Bobby Labonte ^	1
87	Terry Labonte ^	1
87	Jason Leffler	1
87	Raphaël Lessard	1
87	Donny Lia	1
87	Justin Lofton	1
87	Sam Mayer	1
87	Jamie McMurray °	1
87	Butch Miller	1
87	Ryan Newman °	1
87	Steve Park	1
87	Bryan Reffner	1
87	David Reutimann	1
87	Gio Ruggiero	1
87	Elliott Sadler °	1
87	Boris Said	1
87	Ken Schrader	1
87	Sammy Smith °	1
87	Scott Speed	1
87	Jimmy Spencer	1
87	Daniel Suárez °	1
87	John Wes Townley	1
87	Martin Truex Jr.	1
87	Michael Waltrip	1
87	Brandon Whitt	1

=== Driver wins on current tracks ===
Track	Active drivers	Wins
Atlanta Motor Speedway	Kyle Busch	9
Bristol Motor Speedway	Kyle Busch	9
Charlotte Motor Speedway	Kyle Busch	8
Coronado Street Course	Layne Riggs	1
Darlington Raceway	Sheldon Creed, Bobby Hamilton, and Kasey Kahne, Corey Heim	2
Daytona International Speedway	Johnny Sauter	3
Dover Motor Speedway	Kyle Busch	5
Homestead–Miami Speedway	Kyle Busch	3
Lime Rock Park	Grant Enfinger and Corey Heim	1
Lucas Oil Indianapolis Raceway Park	Ron Hornaday Jr.	4
Kansas Speedway	Matt Crafton and Kyle Busch	3
Martinsville Speedway	Johnny Sauter	4
Michigan International Speedway	Greg Biffle, Travis Kvapil and Brett Moffitt	2
Nashville Superspeedway	Johnny Benson Jr., Kyle Busch, and Ryan Preece	2
New Hampshire Motor Speedway	Kyle Busch and Ron Hornaday Jr.	3
North Wilkesboro Speedway	Chandler Smith	2
Phoenix Raceway	Kevin Harvick	4
Richmond Raceway	Mike Skinner, Jack Sprague, and Tony Stewart	2
Rockingham Speedway	Tyler Ankrum, Corey Heim, Kasey Kahne, and Kyle Larson	1
St. Petersburg street circuit	Layne Riggs	1
Talladega Superspeedway	Timothy Peters	3
Texas Motor Speedway	Kyle Busch	6
Watkins Glen International	Ron Fellows	2

== See also ==
- List of the closest NASCAR Truck Series finishes
- List of NASCAR Truck Series champions
- NASCAR Cup Series
- NASCAR O'Reilly Auto Parts Series
- Triple Truck Challenge
