= T. J. Clark (racing driver) =

American racing driver (born 1962)

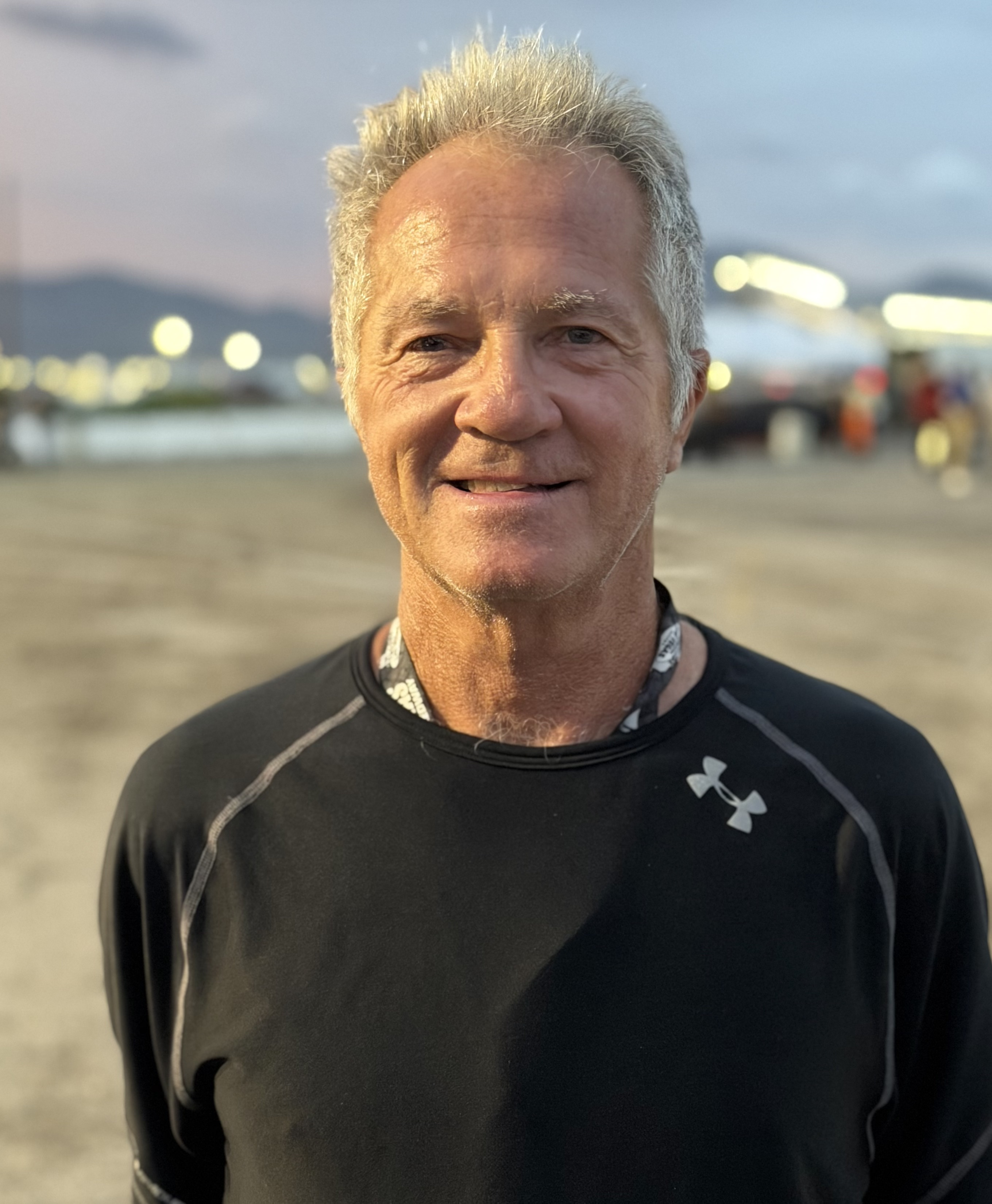
- Clark in 2025
- Born: February 25, 1962 (age 64); Chandler, Arizona, U.S.

NASCAR FedEx Freight Truck Series career
- 31 races run over 3 years
- Best finish: 21st (1995)
- First race: 1995 Skoal Bandit Copper World Classic (Phoenix)
- Last race: 1997 NAPACARD 200 (Evergreen)
Wins	Top tens	Poles
0	0	0

T. J. Clark (born February 25, 1962) is an American former NASCAR driver. He was a fixture on the Craftsman Truck Series tour during its early years.

Clark made the inaugural CTS race in 1995, qualifying the No. 23 Team ASE Racing Ford in the 29th position, finishing 32nd by a crash. Clark ended up only making 13 races of the 20-race schedule. It was not even until the ninth race of the year at Bristol that Clark could manage to finish a race (21st). Overall, his best finish was 12th at Martinsville, and finished 21st in points.

Before 1996, Clark lost ASE to Ultra Motorsports and only made sixteen of the twenty-four races. He matched his career-best of twelfth twice: at Phoenix and Mesa Marin. He also had five other top-twenty finishes. and finished 22nd in the points. Clark made two starts in 1997 as his truck series career came to a close due to funding, finishing of 26th at Phoenix and 28th at Evergreen Speedway. Clark moved to the Winston West Series in 1998, competing in five races with a best finish of 11th. He attempted the 1999 season opener, but failed to qualify. He has not raced since.

== Motorsports career results ==
=== NASCAR ===
(key) (Bold – Pole position awarded by qualifying time. Italics – Pole position earned by points standings or practice time. * – Most laps led.)

==== Craftsman Truck Series ====
NASCAR Craftsman Truck Series results
Year	Team	No.	Make	1	2	3	4	5	6	7	8	9	10	11	12	13	14	15	16	17	18	19	20	21	22	23	24	25	26	NCTC	Pts	Ref
1995	Team ASE Racing	23	Ford	PHO; 32	TUS; 23	SGS	MMR; 29	POR	EVG; DNQ	I70	LVL	BRI; 21	MLW; 19	CNS; 21	HPT; 33	IRP; 22	FLM	RCH; 30	MAR; 12	NWS	SON; 14	MMR; 18								21st	1235	
1995	Team ASE Racing	23	Chevy																				PHO; 40							21st	1235	
1996	Clark Racing	23	Chevy	HOM; DNQ				TUS; 20	CNS; 15	HPT; 31	BRI; 22	NZH; 31	MLW	LVL; 24	I70	IRP; 23	FLM; 17	GLN; 15	NSV; 33	RCH; 34	NHA	MAR; 33	NWS; DNQ	SON; 22	MMR; 12	PHO; DNQ	LVS; 30			22nd	1603	
1996	Rosenblum Racing	51	Chevy		PHO; 12	POR	EVG																							22nd	1603	
1997	Clark Racing	23	Chevy	WDW; DNQ	TUS; DNQ	HOM; DNQ	PHO; 26	POR; DNQ	EVG; 28	I70	NHA	TEX	BRI	NZH	MLW	LVL	CNS	HPT	IRP	FLM	NSV	GLN	RCH	MAR	SON	MMR	CAL	PHO	LVS; DNQ	55th	367	

==== Winston West Series ====
NASCAR Winston West Series results
Year	Team	No.	Make	1	2	3	4	5	6	7	8	9	10	11	12	13	14	NWWC	Pts	Ref
1998	Team ASE Racing	34	Chevy	TUS	LVS; 24	PHO	CAL; 14	HPT	MMR	AMP	POR	CAL; 11	PPR	EVG	SON; 24	MMR	LVS; 38	27th	492	
1999	Team ASE Racing	34	Chevy	TUS	LVS; DNQ	PHO	CAL	PPR	MMR	IRW	EVG	POR	IRW	RMR	LVS	MMR	MOT	93rd	52	
