= 1953 Southern 500 =

Auto race held at Darlington Raceway in 1953

Race details
- Race 30 of 37 in the 1953 NASCAR Grand National Series season
- 1953 Southern 500 program and logo
- Date: September 7, 1953
- Official name: Southern 500
- Location: Darlington Raceway, Darlington, South Carolina
- Course: Permanent racing facility
- Course length: 1.375 miles (2.213 km)
- Distance: 364 laps, 500.0 mi (804.6 km)
- Weather: Very hot with temperatures of 82.9 °F (28.3 °C); wind speeds of 8.9 miles per hour (14.3 km/h)
- Average speed: 92.881 miles per hour (149.477 km/h)
- Attendance: 37,000

Pole position
Driver	Fonty Flock	Frank Christian

Most laps led
Driver	Buck Baker	Bob Griffin
- Laps: 151

Winner
No. 87	Buck Baker	Bob Griffin

Television in the United States
- Network: untelevised
- Announcers: none

The 1953 Southern 500, the fourth running of the event, was a NASCAR Grand National Series event that was held on September 7, 1953, at Darlington Raceway in Darlington, South Carolina.

Junior Johnson would make his NASCAR Cup Series debut in this event; amongst a long list of other rookie drivers. Bob Weatherly, Lonnie Bragg, and Elmer Cooper would race their only NASCAR event here along with several others. " Just months prior to the 1953 running of the Southern 500, the shape of the track made passing opportunities very few. A reconstruction helped to mold the racetrack into a fast venue for stock car racing prior to the completion of Daytona International Speedway.

Along with this track, almost every track in the Southeastern United States had a weekly racing series. During the 1950s, regular passenger cars were not so different from the cars that the NASCAR drivers used at the races. The gulf between everyday passenger vehicles and NASCAR vehicles started to widen in the mid-1970s due to environmental concerns; becoming pronounced by the late-1970s.

== Background ==
Darlington Raceway, nicknamed by many NASCAR fans and drivers as "The Lady in Black" or "The Track Too Tough to Tame" and advertised as a "NASCAR Tradition", is a race track built for NASCAR racing located near Darlington, South Carolina. It is of a unique, somewhat egg-shaped design, an oval with the ends of very different configurations, a condition which supposedly arose from the proximity of one end of the track to a minnow pond the owner refused to relocate. This situation makes it very challenging for the crews to set up their cars' handling in a way that will be effective at both ends.

The track is a four-turn 1.366 miles (2.198 km) oval. The track's first two turns are banked at twenty-five degrees, while the final two turns are banked two degrees lower at twenty-three degrees. The front stretch (the location of the finish line) and the back stretch is banked at six degrees. Darlington Raceway can seat up to 60,000 people.

== Race report ==
A grand total of 59 American drivers competed in this 364-lap event. Due to irregularities in the way that early NASCAR events were recorded, two drivers were recorded as starting in 19th place. Further irregularities would ensue when Elmer Cooper and Bobby Myers ended up jointly qualifying for the race in 50th place. Lloyd Hulette's car number was actually 7777 but since NASCAR didn't seem to allow three-digit numbers at Darlington, much less four, he was scored as 7.

Dick Passwater would make his final NASCAR Grand National Series appearance in this race. Curtis Turner ran the race using a number other than his usual #41. Both Junior Johnson and Lacy Jackson flipped in this race. Johnson would leave the race on lap 222 because he blew a tire and scraped the wall, spinning back into it hood first before flipping once, turning on the nose, and setting back down on the wheels. Meanwhile, Jackson would exit the race in a relatively quiet manner on lap 288. There were 35 lead changes made between four drivers (Buck Baker, Fonty Flock, Herb Thomas and Fireball Roberts). 16 year old Emory Lewis races in his first NASCAR race, who started 19th and finished 46th. This was impressive considering he barely was old enough to have a license, being eligible for just 11 months prior to this race.

Instead of being measured by the apron, the track surface started to be measured by the banking.

Dick Meyer - a native of Porterville, California - would die while street racing back in California just several days after competing in this event. Porterville would eventually bring two more to compete in NASCAR; 1973 Talladega 500 winner Dick Brooks and Marv Acton. Today, Acton is still involved in the stock car world, building NASCAR simulators and owning a shop dedicated to the fabrication of stock car vehicles.

Ned Jarrett was the last-place finisher due to a faulty oil line on lap 8 while Bob Hunter was the lowest-finishing driver to finish the race; 154 laps behind the lead lap drivers. After more than five hours, Buck Baker would defeat Fonty Flock by three laps; Baker would go on to win the 1960 Southern 500 and the 1964 Southern 500 to solidify himself as one of the toughest racers who has ever raced at Darlington.

Flock was the pole sitter at 107.983 miles per hour (173.782 km/h) during qualifying. In contrast to that speed, the average speed of the race was 92.881 miles per hour (149.477 km/h). Seventeen laps were run at reduced speeds as a result of the caution flag. Some of the notable owners in this race were Herb Thomas, Frank Christian and Bob Griffin. More than half the grid failed to finish; Herb Thomas had engine problems on lap 354 but ultimately earned a respectable fifth-place finish. Mike Magill flipped over the wall on lap 244 that caused him to finish in 34th after qualifying 20th.

Five drivers were declared to be "null" entries by NASCAR because they didn't submit their entry blanks within a reasonable period of time. While they were still permitted to race, their finishes did not count towards the overall season standings.

Individual race earnings for this event ranged from the winner's share of $6,285 ($75,631 when adjusted for inflation) to the last-place finisher's portion of $100 ($1,203 when adjusted for inflation) from a total of $24,430 ($293,980 when adjusted for inflation). T.H. King, Boyce Hagler and Smokey Yunick were three notable crew chiefs that participated in this event.

=== Qualifying ===
Grid	No.	Driver	Manufacturer	Owner
1	14	Fonty Flock	'53 Hudson	Frank Christian
2	82	Joe Eubanks	'52 Hudson	Phil Oates
3	120	Dick Rathman	'53 Hudson	Walt Chapman
4	92	Herb Thomas	'53 Hudson	Herb Thomas
5	29	Donald Thomas	'53 Hudson	Herb Thomas
6	11	Fireball Roberts	'53 Oldsmobile	Leland Colvin
7	87	Buck Baker	'53 Oldsmobile	Bob Griffin
8	89	Buddy Shuman	'53 Hudson	B.A. Pless
9	91	Tim Flock	'53 Hudson	Ted Chester
10	44	Curtis Turner	'53 Oldsmobile	Frank Christian
11	45	Ralph Liguori	'53 Lincoln	Al Wheatley
12	9	Jim Reed	'53 Hudson	unknown
13	49	Dick Meyer	'53 Dodge	Dick Meyer
14	47	Otis Martin	'53 Plymouth	Otis Martin
15	06	Marvin Panch	'53 Dodge	Marvin Panch
16	80	Jim Paschal	'53 Dodge	George Hutchens
18	58	Johnny Patterson	'53 Hudson	H.B. Ranier
19	46	Speedy Thompson	'53 Oldsmobile	Bob Pronger
19	13	Emory Lewis	'53 Oldsmobile	Ernest Woods
20	23	Mike Magill	'53 Lincoln	Michael Jarema

== Finishing order ==
Section reference:

1. Buck Baker
2. Fonty Flock
3. Curtis Turner
4. Dick Meyer
5. Herb Thomas
6. Jim Paschal
7. Speedy Thompson
8. Donald Thomas
9. Dick Passwater
10. Tim Flock
11. Lee Petty
12. Elton Hildreth
13. Jimmie Lewallen
14. Buddy Shuman
15. Neil Roberts
16. George Osborne
17. Lloyd Hulette
18. Gene Comstock
19. Fred Dove
20. Bobby Myers
21. Bub King
22. Tyre Rakestraw
23. Gober Soseebee
24. Bob Weatherly
25. Lacy Jackson
26. Johnny Bridgers
27. Chet Williams
28. Marvin Panch
29. Elmer Cooper
30. Arden Mounts
31. Jim Reed
32. Matt Gowan
33. Bill Blair
34. Mike Magill
35. Bill Norton
36. Otis Martin
37. Bill Widenhouse
38. Junior Johnson
39. Weldon Adams
40. J.L. Justice
41. Bob Hunter
42. Dick Rathmann
43. Slick Smith
44. Dick Allwine
45. Fireball Roberts
46. Emory Lewis
47. Clyde Minter
48. Ben Dixon
49. Lonnie Bragg
50. Laird Bruner
51. Joe Guide
52. Johnny Patterson
53. Slim Rominger
54. Ralph Liguori
55. Gayle Warren
56. Joe Eubanks
57. Pop McGinnis
58. Merritt Brown
59. Ned Jarrett

Preceded by 1952	Southern 500 races 1953	Succeeded by 1954
