= 1952 Southern 500 =

Auto race held at Darlington Raceway in 1952

Race details
- Race 25 of 34 in the 1952 NASCAR Grand National Series season
- 1952 Southern 500 program cover
- Date: September 1, 1952
- Official name: Southern 500
- Location: Darlington Raceway, Darlington, South Carolina
- Course: Permanent racing facility
- Course length: 1.25 miles (2.012 km)
- Distance: 400 laps, 500.0 mi (804.6 km)
- Weather: Extremely hot with temperatures of 91 °F (33 °C); wind speeds of 11.1 miles per hour (17.9 km/h)
- Average speed: 74.512 miles per hour (119.915 km/h)
- Attendance: 32,400

Pole position
Driver	Fonty Flock	Frank Christian

Most laps led
Driver	Fonty Flock	Frank Christian
- Laps: 341

Winner
No. 14	Fonty Flock	Frank Christian

Television in the United States
- Network: untelevised
- Announcers: none

Fonty Flock makes his way into "Winner's Circle" with the help of his crew chief, Red Vogt.

The 1952 Southern 500, the third running of the event, was a NASCAR Grand National Series event that was held on September 1, 1952, at Darlington Raceway in Darlington, South Carolina.

== Background ==
Darlington Raceway, nicknamed by many NASCAR fans and drivers as "The Lady in Black" or "The Track Too Tough to Tame" and advertised as a "NASCAR Tradition", is a race track built for NASCAR racing located near Darlington, South Carolina. It is of a unique, somewhat egg-shaped design, an oval with the ends of very different configurations, a condition which supposedly arose from the proximity of one end of the track to a minnow pond the owner refused to relocate. This situation makes it very challenging for the crews to set up their cars' handling in a way that will be effective at both ends.

The track is a four-turn 1.366 miles (2.198 km) oval. The track's first two turns are banked at twenty-five degrees, while the final two turns are banked two degrees lower at twenty-three degrees. The front stretch (the location of the finish line) and the back stretch is banked at six degrees. Darlington Raceway can seat up to 60,000 people.

Darlington has something of a legendary quality among drivers and older fans; this is probably due to its long track length relative to other NASCAR speedways of its era and hence the first venue where many of them became cognizant of the truly high speeds that stock cars could achieve on a long track. The track allegedly earned the moniker The Lady in Black because the night before the race the track maintenance crew would cover the entire track with fresh asphalt sealant, in the early years of the speedway, thus making the racing surface dark black. Darlington is also known as "The Track Too Tough to Tame" because drivers can run lap after lap without a problem and then bounce off of the wall the following lap. Racers will frequently explain that they have to race the racetrack, not their competition. Drivers hitting the wall are considered to have received their "Darlington Stripe" thanks to the missing paint on the right side of the car.

== Race report ==
Seven cautions were waved for forty laps in front of 32,400 audience members. The race's speed was 74.512 miles per hour (119.915 km/h) and 88.550 miles per hour (142.507 km/h) as the pole position speed. This race was constantly threatened to be postponed because of rain and was red flagged once because of actual rainfall. It took six hours, forty-two minutes, and thirty-seven seconds for the race to reach its conclusion, making it the longest Southern 500 ever; Fonty Flock was the winner. He would stop on the front straight, climb up on his hood and lead the entire crowd in singing his own version of the classic Southern American song Dixie.

Flock's uniform would consist of Bermuda shorts and argyle socks in addition to a pencil-thin moustache reminiscent of Clark Gable.

Total winnings for this race were $23,855 ($289,219 when adjusted for inflation). Sixty-six drivers competed; all of them were born in the United States. Jim Paschal was the last place driver of the race; finishing in 66th with an engine problem on lap 18. Jimmy Ingram flipped his vehicle over on lap 91. In four attempts this was Tommy Thompson's best finish at Darlington. There were 12 different manufacturers in this race. Johnny Patterson's awesome 2nd place finish in his second start would prove to be his best in the Cup series. As well as the best finish for owner H.B. Ranier, father of Harry Ranier.

Ranier-Lundy Racing and Petty Enterprises were the only non-independent racing teams to show up for this race.

Tony Bonadies, Johnny Bridgers, Merritt Brown, Johnny Gouveia, Keith Hamner, Possum Jones, Pete Kelly, Banjo Matthews and Joe Weatherly made their NASCAR Grand National Series debut in this event. Roy Hall, Rudy Hires, Jimmy Ingram, Bill Miller, E. C. Ramsey and Rollin Smith would never race in professional stock car racing after this race. W. E. Baker, Al Conroy, Al Fleming and Herb Fry would make their only NASCAR appearances at this race. Red Vogt, Julian Buesink and B.B. Blackburn were the three notable crew chiefs at this event.

=== Finishing order ===
Section reference:

1. Fonty Flock
2. Johnny Patterson
3. Herb Thomas
4. Bub King
5. Banjo Matthews
6. Lee Petty
7. Joe Eubanks
8. Herschel Buchanan
9. Buck Baker
10. Ray Duhigg
11. Jack Smith
12. Rollin Smith
13. Jimmy Thompson
14. Speedy Thompson
15. Lloyd Moore
16. Joe Weatherly
17. Buddy Shuman
18. Keith Hammer
19. Clyde Pittinger
20. Pat Kirkwood
21. Gene Comstock
22. W.E. Baker
23. Herb Fry
24. Iggy Katona
25. Dick Passwater
26. Bill Miller
27. Tony Bonadies
28. Donald Thomas
29. Bob Flock
30. Erwin Blatt
31. Ted Chamberlain
32. Al Fleming
33. Tim Flock
34. E.C. Ramsey
35. Dick Rathmann
36. Al Conroy
37. Coleman Lawrence
38. Charles Weidler
39. Rudy Hires
40. Ralph Liguori
41. Lamar Crabtree
42. Johnny Bridgers
43. Tommy Moon
44. Bill Blair
45. June Cleveland
46. Joe Guide
47. Possum Jones
48. Roy Hall
49. Fireball Roberts
50. Jimmie Lewallen
51. Pete Kelly
52. Bobby Myers
53. Bucky Sager
54. Bob Pronger
55. Larry Mann
56. Weldon Adams
57. Jimmy Ingram
58. Gwyn Staley
59. Johnny Gouveia
60. Tommy Thompson
61. Curtis Turner
62. Gene Darragh
63. Merritt Brown
64. Slick Smith
65. Clyde Minter
66. Jim Paschal

== Timeline ==
Section reference:

- Start of race: Fonty Flock has the pole position.
- Lap 18: Tommy Thompson took over the lead from Fonty Flock, Jim Paschal fell out with engine failure.
- Lap 21: Clyde Minter managed to lose the front end of his vehicle.
- Lap 22: Slick Smith's engine stopped functioning properly.
- Lap 28: Merritt Brown fell out with engine failure.
- Lap 32: Gene Darragh had a terminal crash.
- Lap 35: Curtis Turner had a terminal crash.
- Lap 37: Tommy Thompson fell out with engine failure.
- Lap 38: Fonty Flock takes over the lead from Tommy Thompson.
- Lap 61: Johnny Gouveia managed to overheat his vehicle's vital parts.
- Lap 74: Gwyn Staley managed to overheat his vehicle's vital parts.
- Lap 91: Jimmy Ingram caused a terminal crash by flipping his vehicle over.
- Lap 105: Dick Rathmann takes over the lead from Fonty Flock.
- Lap 125: Weldon Adams had a terminal crash.
- Lap 139: Larry Mann managed to lose the rear end of his vehicle.
- Lap 140: Fonty Flock takes over the lead from Dick Rathmann, Bob Pronger fell out with engine failure.
- Lap 142: Bucky Sager managed to lose his left front wheel while racing at high speeds.
- Lap 145: Bobby Myers fell out with engine failure.
- Lap 162: Pete Kelly fell out with engine failure.
- Lap 168: Jimmy Lewallen made his vehicle's engine nonfunctional.
- Lap 174: Fireball Roberts had a really nasty time with his vehicle's engine.
- Lap 181: Herb Thomas takes over the lead from Fonty Flock.
- Lap 182: Roy Hall managed to exhaust all of his vehicle's tires while running out of gas at the same time.
- Lap 185: Fonty Flock takes over the lead from Herb Thomas.
- Lap 193: Possum Jones managed to overheat his vehicle's vital parts.
- Lap 223: Bill Blair managed to overheat his vehicle's vital parts.
- Lap 240: Tommy Moon managed to overheat his vehicle's vital parts.
- Lap 244: Johnny Bridgers managed to overheat his vehicle's vital parts.
- Lap 254: Lamar Crabtree managed to blow a piston while he was racing.
- Lap 256: Ralph Liguori managed to overheat his vehicle's vital parts.
- Lap 315: Dick Rathmann had a terminal crash.
- Lap 321: Tim Flock had a terminal crash.
- Lap 383: Jimmy Thompson had a terminal crash.
- Finish: Fonty Flock was officially declared the winner of the event.

Preceded by 1951	Southern 500 races 1952	Succeeded by 1953
