= 1953 NASCAR Grand National Series =

American motorsport season

1953 Grand National Series

Seasons
- ← 1952 1954 →

The 1953 NASCAR Grand National Series began on February 1 and ended on November 1. Future NASCAR Hall of Fame driver Herb Thomas, driving his own No. 92 Hudson Hornet, won the championship and became the first repeat champion of the series. It is also the season with the most one-off races. 9 of the 37 races took place on racetracks that only held a cup race in the 1953 season.

== Season recap ==
- Races marked with * took place exclusively in the 1953 season.

No.	Date	Event	Circuit	Winner
1	February 1, 1953	1953–01	Palm Beach Speedway	Lee Petty
2	February 15, 1953	1953–02	Daytona Beach Road Course	Bill Blair
3	March 8, 1953	1953–03	Harnett Speedway*	Herb Thomas
4	March 29, 1953	Wilkes County 200	North Wilkesboro Speedway	Herb Thomas
5	April 5, 1953	1953–05	Charlotte Speedway	Dick Passwater
6	April 19, 1953	Richmond 200	Atlantic Rural Exposition Fairgrounds	Lee Petty
7	April 26, 1953	1953-07	Central City Speedway	Dick Rathmann
8	May 3, 1953	1953–08	Langhorne Speedway	Buck Baker
9	May 9, 1953	1953-09	Columbia Speedway	Buck Baker
10	May 16, 1953	1953–10	Hickory Speedway	Tim Flock
11	May 17, 1953	1953–11	Martinsville Speedway	Lee Petty
12	May 24, 1953	1953–12	Powell Motor Speedway*	Herb Thomas
13	May 30, 1953	Raleigh 300	Raleigh Speedway	Fonty Flock
14	June 7, 1953	1953–14	Louisiana Fairgrounds*	Lee Petty
15	June 14, 1953	1953–15	Five Flags Speedway*	Herb Thomas
16	June 21, 1953	International 200	Langhorne Speedway	Dick Rathmann
17	June 26, 1953	1953–17	Tri-City Speedway	Herb Thomas
18	June 28, 1953	1953–18	Wilson Speedway	Fonty Flock
19	July 3, 1953	1953–19	Monroe County Fairgrounds	Herb Thomas
20	July 4, 1953	1953-20	Piedmont Interstate Fairgrounds*	Lee Petty
21	July 10, 1953	1953–21	Morristown Speedway	Dick Rathmann
22	July 12, 1953	1953–22	Lakewood Speedway	Herb Thomas
23	July 22, 1953	1953–23	Rapid Valley Speedway*	Herb Thomas
24	July 26, 1953	1953–24	Lincoln City Fairgrounds*	Dick Rathmann
25	August 2, 1953	1953–25	Davenport Speedway	Herb Thomas
26	August 9, 1953	1953–26	Occoneechee Speedway	Curtis Turner
27	August 16, 1953	1953–27	Asheville-Weaverville Speedway	Fonty Flock
28	August 23, 1953	1953–28	Princess Anne Speedway*	Herb Thomas
29	August 29, 1953	1953–29	Hickory Speedway	Fonty Flock
30	September 7, 1953	Southern 500	Darlington Raceway	Buck Baker
31	September 13, 1953	1953–31	Central City Speedway	Speedy Thompson
32	September 20, 1953	1953–32	Langhorne Speedway	Dick Rathmann
33	October 3, 1953	1953–33	Bloomsburg Fairgrounds*	Herb Thomas
34	October 4, 1953	1953–34	Wilson Speedway	Herb Thomas
35	October 11, 1953	Wilkes 160	North Wilkesboro Speedway	Speedy Thompson
36	October 13, 1953	1953-36	Martinsville Speedway	Jim Paschal
37	November 1, 1953	1953–37	Lakewood Speedway	Buck Baker

== Race summaries ==
=== 1953-01 ===
The first race of the 1953 season was run on February 1 at the Palm Beach Speedway in West Palm Beach, Florida. Dick Rathmann won the pole position.

Top ten results

1. 42- Lee Petty
2. 41- Jimmie Lewallen
3. 91- Tim Flock
4. 1- Herschel Buchanan
5. 86- Don Oldenberg
6. 55- Bub King
7. 60- Dub Livingston
8. 13- Pop McGinnis
9. 9- Donald Thomas
10. 67- Sam DiRusso

=== 1953-02 ===
The second race of the 1953 season was run on February 15 at the Daytona Beach Road Course in Daytona Beach, Florida. Bob Pronger won the pole. Fonty Flock dominated throughout the race, leading every lap until running out of fuel on the last lap. Flock was then pushed across the finish line by teammate Slick Smith. Officials ruled that this move was illegal, and Flock was awarded with second place, while Bill Blair was declared the winner.

Top ten results

1. 2- Bill Blair
2. 14- Fonty Flock
3. 40- Tommy Thompson
4. 92- Herb Thomas
5. 91- Tim Flock
6. 77- Dick Passwater
7. 41- Curtis Turner
8. 9- Donald Thomas
9. 38- Tom Cherry
10. 4- Slick Smith

•This was the third and final win for Blair.

=== 1953-03 ===
The third race of the 1953 season was run on March 8 at Harnett Speedway in Spring Lake, North Carolina. Herb Thomas won the pole.

Top ten results

1. 92- Herb Thomas
2. 120- Dick Rathmann
3. 42- Lee Petty
4. 78- Dick Passwater
5. 1- Herschel Buchanan
6. 18- Mike Klapak
7. 91- Tim Flock
8. 24- Ray Duhigg
9. ??- Don Oldenberg
10. 71- Keith Hamner

=== Wilkes County 200 ===
The fourth race of the season was run on March 29 at North Wilkesboro Speedway in North Wilkesboro, North Carolina. Herb Thomas won the pole.

Top ten results

1. 92- Herb Thomas
2. 120- Dick Rathmann
3. 14- Fonty Flock
4. 42- Lee Petty
5. 43- Jimmie Lewallen
6. 87- Buck Baker
7. 82- Joe Eubanks
8. 4- Slick Smith
9. 78- Dick Passwater
10. 55- Bub King

=== 1953-05 ===
The fifth race of the season was run on April 5 at Charlotte Speedway in Charlotte, North Carolina. Tim Flock won the pole.

Top ten results

1. 78- Dick Passwater
2. 51- Gober Sosebee
3. 1- Herschel Buchanan
4. 91- Tim Flock
5. 13- Pop McGinnis
6. 100- Otis Martin
7. 19- Fred Dove
8. 18- Mike Klapak
9. 55- Bub King
10. 3- Coleman Lawrence

This race stands as Passwater's lone win out of 20 starts from 1952 to 1953.

=== Richmond 200 ===
The sixth race of the season was run on April 19 at the Atlantic Rural Exposition Fairgrounds in Richmond, Virginia. Buck Baker won the pole.

Top ten results

1. 42- Lee Petty
2. 120- Dick Rathmann
3. 87- Buck Baker
4. 78- Dick Passwater
5. 2- Bill Blair
6. 44- Ray Duhigg
7. 9- Donald Thomas
8. 8- Gene Comstock
9. 19- Fred Dove
10. 92- Herb Thomas

=== 1953-07 ===
The seventh race of the season was run on April 26 at Central City Speedway in Macon, Georgia. Dick Rathmann won the pole.

Top ten results

1. 120- Dick Rathmann
2. 92- Herb Thomas
3. 43- Jimmie Lewallen
4. 14- Fonty Flock
5. 78- Dick Passwater
6. 91- Tim Flock
7. 82- Joe Eubanks
8. 87- Buck Baker
9. 93- Ted Chamberlain
10. 66- Virgil Livengood

=== 1953-08 ===
The eighth race of the season was run on May 3 at Langhorne Speedway in Langhorne, Pennsylvania. Tim Flock captured the pole.

Top ten results

1. 87- Buck Baker
2. 42- Lee Petty
3. 14- Fonty Flock
4. 1- Herschel Buchanan
5. 91- Tim Flock
6. 44- Ray Duhigg
7. 92- Herb Thomas
8. 18- Bill Adams
9. 46- Ralph Liguori
10. 93- Ted Chamberlain

=== 1953-09 ===
The ninth race of the season was run on May 9 at Columbia Speedway in Columbia, South Carolina. Herb Thomas won the pole.

Top ten results

1. 87- Buck Baker
2. 91- Tim Flock
3. 43- Jimmie Lewallen
4. 44- Ray Duhigg
5. 42- Lee Petty
6. 51- Gober Sosebee
7. 2- Bill Blair
8. 92- Herb Thomas
9. ??- Bill Jennings
10. 11- Ralph Dyer

=== 1953-10 ===
The tenth race of the season was run on May 16 at Hickory Speedway in Hickory, North Carolina. Herb Thomas won the pole.

Top ten results

1. 91- Tim Flock
2. 82- Joe Eubanks
3. 44- Ray Duhigg
4. 78- Dick Passwater
5. 120- Dick Rathmann
6. ??- Bob Welborn
7. 100- Otis Martin
8. 1- Herschel Buchanan
9. 13- Pop McGinnis
10. 3- Clyde Minter

=== 1953-11 ===
The eleventh race of the season was run on May 17 at Martinsville Speedway in Martinsville, Virginia. Joe Eubanks won the pole.

Top ten results

1. 42- Lee Petty
2. 92- Herb Thomas
3. 120- Dick Rathmann
4. 44- Ray Duhigg
5. 46- Ralph Liguori
6. 78- Dick Passwater
7. 87- Buck Baker
8. 45- Bob Welborn
9. 3- Clyde Minter
10. 98- Lyle Scott
- This race marked the NASCAR debut of Wood Brothers Racing, with co-owner Glen Wood driving. Wood would finish 30th.

=== 1953-12 ===
The twelfth race of the season was run on May 24 at Powell Motor Speedway in Columbus, Ohio. Fonty Flock captured the pole position for the race.

Top ten results

1. 92- Herb Thomas
2. 120- Dick Rathmann
3. 87- Buck Baker
4. 41- Curtis Turner
5. 13- Pop McGinnis
6. 11- Ralph Dyer
7. ??- Ed Benedict
8. 42- Lee Petty
9. 8- Gene Comstock
10. 55- Bub King

=== Raleigh 300 ===
The thirteenth race of the season was run on May 30 at Raleigh Speedway in Raleigh, North Carolina. Slick Smith won the pole.

Top ten results

1. 14- Fonty Flock
2. 12- Speedy Thompson
3. 91- Tim Flock
4. 92- Herb Thomas
5. 78- Dick Passwater
6. 120- Dick Rathmann
7. 4- Slick Smith
8. 42- Lee Petty
9. 44- Ray Duhigg
10. 82- Joe Eubanks

=== 1953-14 ===
The fourteenth race of the season was run on June 7 at the Louisiana Fairgrounds in Shreveport, Louisiana. Herb Thomas won the pole.

Top ten results

1. 42- Lee Petty
2. 120- Dick Rathmann
3. 92- Herb Thomas
4. 91- Tim Flock
5. 87- Buck Baker
6. 1- Herschel Buchanan
7. 51- Gober Sosebee
8. 11- Ralph Dyer
9. ??- Elbert Allen
10. 4- Slick Smith

=== 1953-15 ===
The fifteen race of the season was run on June 14 at Five Flags Speedway in Pensacola, Florida. Dick Rathmann won the pole.

Top ten results

1. 92- Herb Thomas
2. 120- Dick Rathmann
3. 42- Lee Petty
4. 87- Buck Baker
5. 91- Tim Flock
6. 78- Dick Passwater
7. 82- Joe Eubanks
8. 4- Slick Smith
9. 51- Gober Sosebee
10. 191- Fred Moore

=== International 200 ===
The sixteenth race of the season was run on June 21 at Langhorne Speedway in Langhorne, Pennsylvania. Lloyd Shaw won the pole.

Top ten results

1. 120- Dick Rathmann
2. 42- Lee Petty
3. 80- Jim Paschal
4. 92- Herb Thomas
5. 2- Bill Blair
6. 15- Dick Allwine
7. 91- Tim Flock
8. 10- Nick Fornono
9. 23- Billy Oswald
10. 60- Bill Rexford

=== 1953-17 ===
The seventeenth race of the season was run on June 26 at Tri-City Speedway in High Point, North Carolina. Herb Thomas won the pole.

Top ten results

1. 92- Herb Thomas
2. 120- Dick Rathmann
3. 82- Joe Eubanks
4. 87- Buck Baker
5. 42- Lee Petty
6. 80- Jim Paschal
7. 78- Slick Smith
8. 41- Jimmie Lewallen
9. ??- Buck Smith
10. 34- Andy Winfree

=== 1953-18 ===
The eighteenth race of the season was run on June 28 at Wilson Speedway in Wilson, North Carolina. Buck Baker earned the pole position for the event.

Top ten results

1. 14- Fonty Flock
2. 120- Dick Rathmann
3. 92- Herb Thomas
4. 82- Joe Eubanks
5. 87- Buck Baker
6. 12- Speedy Thompson
7. 91- Tim Flock
8. 19- Fred Dove
9. 42- Lee Petty
10. 41- Jimmie Lewallen

=== 1953-19 ===
The nineteenth race of the season was run on July 3 at the Monroe County Fairgrounds in Rochester, New York. Tim Flock won the pole.

Top ten results

1. 92- Herb Thomas
2. 120- Dick Rathmann
3. 42- Lee Petty
4. 91- Tim Flock
5. 60- Bill Rexford
6. ??- Bob Cameron
7. ??- John Meggers
8. ??- Jerry Earl
9. ??- Russ Truelove
10. 167- Elton Hildreth

=== 1953-20 ===
The twentieth race of the season was run on July 4 at the Piedmont Interstate Fairgrounds in Spartanburg, South Carolina. Buck Baker won the pole.

Top ten results

1. 42- Lee Petty
2. 87- Buck Baker
3. 92- Herb Thomas
4. 14- Fonty Flock
5. 58- Johnny Patterson
6. 82- Joe Eubanks
7. ??- Elbert Allen
8. 51- Gober Sosebee
9. 108- Arden Mounts
10. 120- Dick Rathmann

=== 1953-21 ===
The twenty-first race of the season was run on July 10 at Morristown Speedway in Morristown, New Jersey. Herb Thomas won the pole.

Top ten results

1. 120- Dick Rathmann
2. 92- Herb Thomas
3. 42- Lee Petty
4. 80- Jim Paschal
5. 53- Ronnie Kohler
6. ??- Eddie Riker
7. 167- Elton Hildreth
8. ??- Charles Barry
9. ??- John Meggers
10. ??- Bill Cleveland

=== 1953-22 ===
The twenty-second race of the season was run on July 12 at Lakewood Speedway in Atlanta, Georgia. Herb Thomas won the pole.

Top ten results

1. 92- Herb Thomas
2. 120- Dick Rathmann
3. 42- Lee Petty
4. 82- Joe Eubanks
5. ??- Jerry Wimbish
6. 50- Gober Sosebee
7. 87- Buck Baker
8. ??- Neil Roberts
9. ??- C. H. Dingler
10. 33- Gordon Bracken

=== 1953-23 ===
The twenty-third race of the season was run on July 22 at Rapid Valley Speedway in Rapid City, South Dakota. Herb Thomas captured the pole for the event.

Top ten results

1. 92- Herb Thomas
2. 120- Dick Rathmann
3. 14- Fonty Flock
4. 42- Lee Petty
5. 87- Buck Baker
6. 9- Bill Harrison
7. 28- Eddie Skinner
8. ??- Leo Ray
9. ??- Dick Fellows
10. ??- C. H. Dingler

=== 1953-24 ===
The twenty-fourth race of the season was run on July 26 at the Lincoln City Fairgrounds in North Platte, Nebraska. Herb Thomas won the pole.

Top ten results

1. 120- Dick Rathmann
2. 92- Herb Thomas
3. 42- Lee Petty
4. 87- Buck Baker
5. ??- Marvin Copple
6. 9- Bill Harrison
7. ??- Byron Clouse
8. ??- C. H. Dingler
9. ??- Tubby Harrison
10. ??- Sandy Slack

=== 1953-25 ===
The twenty-fifth race of the season was run on August 2 at Davenport Speedway in Davenport, Iowa. Buck Baker won the pole.

Top ten results

1. 92- Herb Thomas
2. 87- Buck Baker
3. 42- Lee Petty
4. 120- Dick Rathmann
5. 14- Fonty Flock
6. 9- Bill Harrison
7. ??- Mel Krueger
8. ??- Johnny Beauchamp
9. ??- Tubby Harrison
10. ??- Keith Lucas

=== 1953-26 ===
The twenty-sixth race of the season was run on August 9 at Occoneechee Speedway in Hillsboro, North Carolina. Curtis Turner won the pole.

Top ten results

1. 41- Curtis Turner
2. 92- Herb Thomas
3. 42- Lee Petty
4. 82- Joe Eubanks
5. 2- Bill Blair
6. 80- Jim Paschal
7. 4- Slick Smith
8. 167- Elton Hildreth
9. 22- Jimmie Lewallen
10. ??- Jimmy Ayers

=== 1953-27 ===
The twenty-seventh race of the season was run on August 16 at Asheville-Weaverville Speedway in Weaverville, North Carolina. Curtis Turner won the pole.

Top ten results

1. 14- Fonty Flock
2. 92- Herb Thomas
3. 2- Bill Blair
4. 87- Buck Baker
5. 22- Jimmie Lewallen
6. 4- Slick Smith
7. 42- Lee Petty
8. 8- Gene Comstock
9. 3- Jimmy Ayers
10. 91- Tim Flock

=== 1953-28 ===
The twenty-eighth race of the season was run on August 23 at Princess Anne Speedway in Norfolk, Virginia. Curtis Turner captured the pole position.

Top ten results

1. 92- Herb Thomas
2. 14- Fonty Flock
3. 42- Lee Petty
4. 120- Dick Rathmann
5. 80- Jim Paschal
6. 87- Buck Baker
7. ??- Andy Winfree
8. ??- John Meggers
9. ??- Ralph Rose
10. 51- Gober Sosebee

=== 1953-29 ===
The twenty-ninth race of the season was run on August 29 at Hickory Speedway in Hickory, North Carolina. Tim Flock won the pole. This was the first Grand National race for the 1961 and 1965 champion and future NASCAR Hall of Fame member Ned Jarrett. He finished 11th.

Top ten results

1. 14- Fonty Flock
2. 92- Herb Thomas
3. 82- Joe Eubanks
4. 42- Lee Petty
5. 22- Jimmie Lewallen
6. 4- Slick Smith
7. 91- Tim Flock
8. 19- Fred Dove
9. ??- Ralph Rose
10. ??- Buck Baker

=== Southern 500 ===
The thirtieth race of the season was run on September 7 at Darlington Raceway in Darlington, South Carolina. Fonty Flock won the pole. Buck Baker won the event by three laps. This race also marked the first Grand National race for future NASCAR Hall of Fame member Junior Johnson. Johnson finished 38th after being involved in a wreck.

Top ten results

1. 87- Buck Baker
2. 14- Fonty Flock
3. 44- Curtis Turner
4. 49- Dick Meyer
5. 92- Herb Thomas
6. 80- Jim Paschal
7. 46- Speedy Thompson
8. 29- Donald Thomas
9. 00- Dick Passwater
10. 91- Tim Flock

=== 1953-31 ===
The thirty-first race of the season was run on September 13 at Central City Speedway in Macon, Georgia. Joe Eubanks won the pole.

Top ten results

1. 12- Speedy Thompson
2. 42- Lee Petty
3. 51- Gober Sosebee
4. 82- Joe Eubanks
5. 91- Tim Flock
6. 92- Herb Thomas
7. 87- Buck Baker
8. Bob Walden
9. 4- Slick Smith
10. 34- Andy Winfree

• This was the first of twenty victories for Thompson.

=== 1953-32 ===
The thirty-second race of the season was run on September 20 at Langhorne Speedway in Langhorne, Pennsylvania. Herb Thomas won the pole.

Top ten results

1. 120- Dick Rathmann
2. 92- Herb Thomas
3. 46- Speedy Thompson
4. 9 Jim Reed
5. 80- Jim Paschal
6. 42- Lee Petty
7. 41- Curtis Turner
8. 82- Joe Eubanks
9. 22- Jimmie Lewallen
10. 18- Bobby Myers

=== 1953-33 ===
The thirty-third race of the season was run on October 3 at the Bloomsburg Fairgrounds in Bloomsburg, Pennsylvania. Jim Paschal won the pole.

Top ten results

1. 92- Herb Thomas
2. 120- Dick Rathmann
3. 87- Buck Baker
4. 167- Elton Hildreth
5. 24- Bob Welborn
6. 42- Lee Petty
7. 93- Ted Chamberlain
8. ??- Bob Walden
9. ??- Wimpy Ervin
10. ??- Ed DeWolff

=== 1953-34 ===
The thirty-fourth race of the season was run on October 4 at Wilson Speedway in Wilson, North Carolina. Herb Thomas won the pole.

Top ten results

1. 92- Herb Thomas
2. 46- Speedy Thompson
3. 14- Fonty Flock
4. 42- Lee Petty
5. 45- Ralph Liguori
6. 120- Dick Rathmann
7. 87- Buck Baker
8. 167- Elton Hildreth
9. 22- Jimmie Lewallen
10. 51- Gober Sosebee

=== Wilkes 160 ===
The thirty-fifth race of the season was run on October 11 at North Wilkesboro Speedway in North Wilkesboro, North Carolina. Buck Baker won the pole.

Top ten results

1. 46- Speedy Thompson
2. 17- Fonty Flock
3. 44- Ray Duhigg
4. 24- Bob Welborn
5. 42- Lee Petty
6. 87- Buck Baker
7. 2- Bill Blair
8. 82- Joe Eubanks
9. 22- Jimmie Lewallen
10. 55- Bub King

=== 1953-36 ===
The thirty-sixth race of the season was run on October 13 at Martinsville Speedway in Martinsville, Virginia. Fonty Flock won the pole.

Top ten results

1. 80- Jim Paschal
2. 42- Lee Petty
3. 2- Bill Blair
4. 42- Fonty Flock
5. ??- Carl Burris
6. 13- Emory Lewis
7. 24- Bob Welborn
8. ??- Bill Morgan
9. ??- Clyde Minter
10. 111- Joe Bill O'Dell

•Pascal's win was the first of 25 wins over a 23-year career.

=== 1953-37 ===
The thirty-seventh and final race of the season was run on November 1 at Lakewood Speedway in Atlanta, Georgia. Tim Flock started on the pole but finished 20th due to an overheating problem. Herb Thomas, the 1953 champion, finished 14th.

Top ten results

1. 87- Buck Baker
2. 14- Fonty Flock
3. 42- Lee Petty
4. 80- Jim Paschal
5. 22- Jimmie Lewallen
6. 58- Johnny Patterson
7. 13- Pop McGinnis
8. 82- Joe Eubanks
9. 25- Bob Welborn
10. ??- Ewell Weddle

== 1953 Grand National final standings ==
Pos.	Driver	Pts.	St	W	T5	T10	Poles
1	Herb Thomas	8460	37	12	27	31	12
2	Lee Petty	7814	36	5	26	32	0
3	Dick Rathmann	7362	35	5	21	24	3
4	Buck Baker	6713	33	4	16	25	5
5	Fonty Flock	6174	33	4	17	17	3
6	Tim Flock	5011	26	1	11	18	3
7	Jim Paschal	4211	23	1	6	9	1
8	Joe Eubanks	3603	24	0	7	15	2
9	Jimmie Lewallen	3208	22	0	7	13	0
10	Curtis Turner	3373	19	1	3	5	3
11	Speedy Thompson	2958	7	2	5	7	0
12	Slick Smith	2670	23	0	0	10	1
13	Elton Hildreth	2625	25	0	1	5	0
14	Gober Sosebee	2525	17	0	2	9	0
15	Bill Blair	2457	21	1	6	8	0
16	Fred Dove	1997	20	0	0	4	0
17	Bub King	1624	14	0	0	5	0
18	Gene Comstock	1519	13	0	0	3	0
19	Donald Thomas	1408	17	0	0	4	0
20	Ralph Liguori	1336	12	0	2	3	0
