= Glen Wood =

American racing driver and team owner (1925–2019)

- Born: Glenn Alexandria Wood; July 18, 1925; Stuart, Virginia, U.S.
- Died: January 18, 2019 (aged 93); Stuart, Virginia, U.S.
- Awards: Named one of NASCAR's 50 Greatest Drivers (1998); Motorsports Hall of Fame of America (2000); International Motorsports Hall of Fame (2002); 2× Bowman Gray Stadium Modified Champion (1954, 1961); NASCAR Hall of Fame (2012); Named one of NASCAR's 75 Greatest Drivers (2023); 1958 Grand National Series Most Popular Driver

NASCAR Cup Series career
- 62 races run over 11 years
- Best finish: 57th (1959)
- First race: 1953 Race 11 (Martinsville)
- Last race: 1964 Race 50 (Starkey)
- First win: 1960 Race 13 (Bowman Gray)
- Last win: 1963 Race 33 (Bowman Gray)
Wins	Top tens	Poles
4	34	14

Glenn Alexandria Wood (July 18, 1925 – January 18, 2019) was an American NASCAR driver from Stuart, Virginia.

== Early life ==
Wood and brother Leonard Wood co-founded the legendary Wood Brothers Racing team in 1953, and won four races over an eleven-year racing career. In 1998, he was named one of NASCAR's 50 Greatest Drivers. In 2006, Wood was inducted into the Virginia Sports Hall of Fame; he was also inducted into the NASCAR Hall of Fame in 2012.

Wood died on January 18, 2019, after a battle with illnesses.

== Motorsports career results ==
=== NASCAR ===
(key) (Bold – Pole position awarded by qualifying time. Italics – Pole position earned by points standings or practice time. * – Most laps led.)

==== Grand National Series ====
NASCAR Grand National Series results
Year	Team	No.	Make	1	2	3	4	5	6	7	8	9	10	11	12	13	14	15	16	17	18	19	20	21	22	23	24	25	26	27	28	29	30	31	32	33	34	35	36	37	38	39	40	41	42	43	44	45	46	47	48	49	50	51	52	53	54	55	56	57	58	59	60	61	62	NGNC	Pts	Ref
1953	Wood Brothers	21	Lincoln	PBS	DAB	HAR	NWS	CLT	RCH	CCS	LAN	CLB	HCY	MAR; 30	PMS	RSP; 20	LOU	FFS	LAN	TCS	WIL	MCF	PIF	MOR	ATL	RVS	LCF	DAV	HBO	AWS	PAS	HCY	DAR	CCS	LAN	BLF	WIL	NWS	MAR	ATL																										64th	188	
1954		163	Olds	PBS	DAB	JSP	ATL	OSP	OAK	NWS	HBO	CCS	LAN	WIL	MAR	SHA	RSP	CLT	GAR	CLB	LND	HCY	MCF	WGS	PIF	AWS	SFS	GRS	MOR	OAK	CLT	SAN	COR	DAR	CCS	CLT	LAN	MAS	MAR; 41	NWS																										217th	8	
1955	Wood Brothers Racing	22-A	Ford	TCS	PBS	JSP	DAB	OSP	CLB	HBO	NWS	MGY	LAN	CLT	HCY	ASF	TUS	MAR	RCH	NCF	FOR	LIN	MCF	FON	AIR	CLT	PIF	CLB	AWS	MOR	ALS	NYF	SAN	CLT	FOR	MAS	RSP	DAR	MGY	LAN	RSP	GPS	MAS	CLB	MAR; 26	LVP	NWS	HBO																		242nd	-	
1956	Wood Brothers Racing	21	Ford	HCY	CLT	WSS	PBS	ASF	DAB; 79	PBS	WIL	ATL	NWS	LAN	RCH	CLB	CON	GPS	HCY	HBO	MAR	LIN	CLT	POR	EUR	NYF	MER	MAS	CLT	MCF	POR	AWS	RSP	PIF	CSF	CHI	CCF	MGY	OKL	ROA	OBS	SAN	NOR	PIF	MYB	POR	DAR	CSH									MAR; 33	HCY	WIL							246th	-	
1956	Fred Frazier	35	Ford																																														CLT; 21	LAN	POR	CLB	HBO	NWP	CLT	CCF										246th	-	
1957	Wood Brothers Racing	712	Ford	WSS	CON	TIC	DAB; 11																																																											NA	-	
1957	Wood Brothers Racing	112	Ford					CON; 13	WIL	HBO	AWS	NWS	LAN	CLT	PIF	GBF	POR	CCF	RCH	MAR	POR	EUR	LIN	LCS	ASP	NWP	CLB	CPS	PIF	JAC																																				NA	-	
1957	Wood Brothers Racing	21	Ford																												RSP; 6	CLT	MAS; 11	POR	HCY	NOR	LCS	GLN	KPC	LIN	OBS	MYB	DAR	NYF	AWS	CSF	SCF	LAN; 36	CLB	CCF	CLT	MAR; 13	NBR	CON	NWS	GBF										NA	-	
1958	Wood Brothers Racing	21	Ford	FAY	DAB	CON	FAY	WIL	HBO	FAY	CLB	PIF	ATL	CLT	MAR; 10	ODS	OBS	GPS	GBF	STR; 6	NWS; 9	BGS; 7	TRN	RSD	CLB	NBS	REF	LIN	HCY	AWS	RSP; 13	MCC	SLS	TOR	BUF	MCF	BEL	BRR	CLB	NSV; 12	AWS; 24	BGS	MBS	DAR	CLT	BIR	CSF	GAF	RCH	HBO	SAS	**MAR**; 9*	**NWS**; 2	**ATL**; 10												NA	-	
1959	Wood Brothers Racing	21	Ford	FAY; 2	DAY	DAY; 34	HBO; 6	CON	ATL	WIL			NWS; 20	REF	HCY	MAR; 11	TRN	CLT	NSV	ASP	PIF	GPS	ATL	CLB	WIL; 3	RCH; 2	BGS; 19				CLT; 9	MBS; 4	CLT	NSV	AWS; 28			CLB; 5	DAR	HCY	RCH; 12	CSF	HBO																							57th	470	
1959	Paul Spaulding	11	Ford								BGS; 8	CLB																																																						57th	470	
1959	Wood Brothers	16	Ford																									**AWS**; 13	DAY	HEI						BGS; 2	GPS							**MAR**; 2	AWS; 2	**NWS**; 7																				57th	470	
1959	Tom Vernon	98	Ford																																												CON; 5																			57th	470	
1960	Wood Brothers Racing	21	Ford	CLT	CLB	DAY	DAY	DAY	CLT	NWS; 3	PHO	CLB										RCH; 5	HMS	CLT																			**MAR**; 25	NWS	CLT	RCH	ATL																			103rd	244	
1960	Wood Brothers Racing	24	Ford										**MAR**; 3*	HCY	WIL																																																			103rd	244	
1960	Wood Brothers Racing	16	Ford													**BGS**; 1*	GPS	AWS; 16	DAR	PIF	HBO				BGS; 1*	DAY	HEI	MAB	MBS	ATL	BIR	NSV	AWS; 6	PIF	CLB	SBO	**BGS**; 1*	DAR	HCY	CSF	GSP	HBO																								103rd	244	
1961	Wood Brothers Racing	21	Ford	CLT	JSP	DAY	DAY	DAY	PIF	AWS	HMS	ATL	GPS	HBO	**BGS**; 2	MAR; 3	NWS	CLB	HCY	RCH	MAR; 22	DAR	CLT	CLT	RSD	ASP	CLT	PIF	BIR	GPS	BGS; 18	NOR	HAS	STR	DAY	ATL	CLB	MBS	BRI	NSV	BGS; 2*	AWS	RCH	SBO	DAR	HCY	RCH	CSF	ATL	MAR; 20	NWS	CLT	BRI	GPS	HBO											64th	1540	
1963	Wood Brothers Racing	21	Ford	BIR	GGS	**THS**; 15*	RSD	DAY	DAY	DAY	PIF	AWS	HBO	ATL	HCY	BRI	AUG	RCH	GPS	SBO	BGS	MAR	NWS	CLB	THS	DAR	ODS	RCH	CLT	BIR	ATL	DAY	MBS	SVH	DTS	**BGS**; 1*	ASH	OBS	BRR	BRI	GPS	NSV	CLB	AWS	PIF	BGS; 3	ONA	DAR	HCY	RCH	MAR	DTS	NWS	THS	CLT	SBO	HBO	RSD								73rd	944	
1964	Wood Brothers Racing	21	Ford	CON	AUG	JSP	SVH	RSD	DAY	DAY	DAY	RCH	BRI	GPS	BGS	ATL	AWS	HBO	PIF	CLB	NWS	MAR	SVH	DAR	LGY	HCY	SBO	CLT	GPS	ASH	ATL	CON	NSV	CHT	BIR	VAL	PIF	DAY	ODS	OBS	BRR	ISP	GLN	LIN	BRI	NSV	MBS	AWS	DTS	ONA	CLB	BGS; 19	**STR**; 3	DAR	HCY	RCH	ODS	HBO	MAR	SVH	NWS	CLT	HAR	AUG	JAC	100th	480	

===== Daytona 500 =====
Year	Team	Manufacturer	Start	Finish
1959	Wood Brothers Racing	Ford	8	34
