= Elmer Musclow =

American racing driver (1924–2005)

- Born: Elmer Floyd Musclow; October 8, 1924 Rochester, New York
- Died: March 29, 2005 (aged 80)
- Retired: 1962
- Debut season: 1947

Modified racing career
- Car number: 18
- Championships: 6
- Wins: 75+

NASCAR Cup Series career
- 2 races run over 2 years
- Best finish: 128th (1953)
- First race: 1953 Race 19 (Rochester)
- Last race: 1954 Race 20 (Rochester)
| Wins | Top tens | Poles |
|---|---|---|
| 0 | 0 | 0 |

Elmer Musclow (October 8, 1924 – March 29, 2005) was an American stock car racing driver from Rochester, NY. He is regarded as a pioneer of motorsports, competing in the 1940s when prizes seldom exceeded the likes of quarter barrels of beer and complimentary dinner tickets.

== Racing career ==
Elmer Musclow made two appearances in the NASCAR Grand National Series, finishing 15th in each. He spent the majority of his career racing in the NASCAR Sportsman Division (predecessor of the O'Reilly Auto Parts Series) and Modified divisions competing at the renowned tracks of Central New York, including Canandaigua Fairgrounds, Lancaster Speedway, Spencer Speedway in Williamson, and the New York State Fairgrounds. He was 1958 and 1960 track champion at the Monroe County Fairgrounds Speedway.

Musclow was recipient of the Eastman Kodak Company's Auto Racing all-time greatest award, and was an inaugural inductee into the Northeast Dirt Modified Hall of Fame.

== Motorsports career results ==
=== NASCAR ===
(key) (Bold – Pole position awarded by qualifying time. Italics – Pole position earned by points standings or practice time. * – Most laps led.)

==== Grand National Series ====
NASCAR Grand National Series results
| Year | Team | No. | Make | 1 | 2 | 3 | 4 | 5 | 6 | 7 | 8 | 9 | 10 | 11 | 12 | 13 | 14 | 15 | 16 | 17 | 18 | 19 | 20 | 21 | 22 | 23 | 24 | 25 | 26 | 27 | 28 | 29 | 30 | 31 | 32 | 33 | 34 | 35 | 36 | 37 | NGNC | Pts | Ref |
|---|---|---|---|---|---|---|---|---|---|---|---|---|---|---|---|---|---|---|---|---|---|---|---|---|---|---|---|---|---|---|---|---|---|---|---|---|---|---|---|---|---|---|---|
| 1953 | | | Hudson | PBS | DAB | HAR | NWS | CLT | RCH | CCS | LAN | CLB | HCY | MAR | PMS | RSP | LOU | FIF | LAN | TCS | WIL | MCF; 15 | PIF | MOR | ATL | RVS | LCF | DAV | HBO | AWS | PAS | HCY | DAR | CCS | LAN | BLF | WIL | NWS | MAR | ATL | 128th | 92 | |
| 1954 | | 18 | Ford | PBS | DAB | JSP | ATL | OSP | OAK | NWS | HBO | CCS | LAN | WIL | MAR | SHA | RSP | CLT | GAR | CLB | LND | HCY | MCF; 15 | WGS | PIF | AWS | SFS | GRS | MOR | OAK | CLT | SAN | COR | DAR | CCS | CLT | LAN | MAS | MAR | NWS | 134th | 88 | |
