= 1952 NASCAR Grand National Series =

American motorsport season

1952 Grand National Series

Seasons
- ← 1951 1953 →

The 1952 NASCAR Grand National Series was the fourth season of the premier stock car racing championship sanctioned by NASCAR. Once the season was concluded, driver Tim Flock was crowned the Grand National champion after winning 8 of the 33 events that he competed in. This was the first year that NASCAR scheduled its events to avoid the conflicts of having two races, at two different tracks, on the same day. The only exception was on June 1, when races were held at both Toledo Speedway in Ohio, and Hayloft Speedway in Augusta, Georgia. Herb Thomas finished second to Flock after competing in 32 races, and Lee Petty finished third in the standings that year. Throughout the 1952 season, a total of 261 drivers entered at least one of the 34 events. Virtually every American car manufacturer had at least one of their cars start that season.

This was also the first season that sponsors such as Pure Oil Co (which later became Union 76, and eventually Unocal), and Champion Spark Plug Inc. started paying contingency award monies in exchange for the publicity they received by drivers sponsoring their products.

== 1952 season recap ==
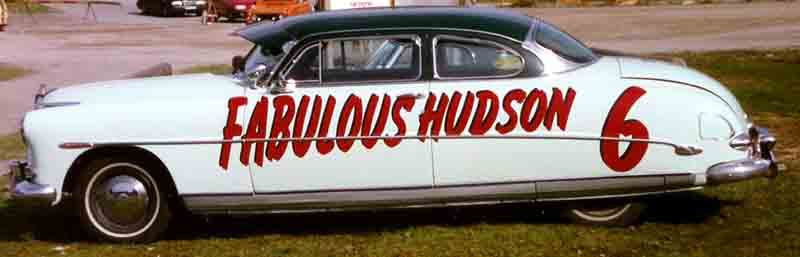
a Hudson Hornet, outfitted for racing, circa early 1950s

The 1952 NASCAR Grand National season was dominated by Hudson automobiles, winning 27 of the scheduled 34 races. No other make won more than three times. The reason the Hudson Hornet was so successful, winning over 80 NASCAR races between 1951 and 1955, has been attributed to its low center of gravity, "mono-built" body and center point steering system. The center point steering system contributed to the car's superior handling and cornering abilities; allowing the vehicle to excel on the dirt-covered race tracks of the day.

Palm Beach Speedway in West Palm Beach, Florida, was a half-mile, dirt track that saw its first NASCAR event when it opened the 1952 NASCAR season on January 20, 1952. The 100-mile event was slowed by two caution flags, and was won by driver Tim Flock. Six-thousand fans were on hand to see Flock capture his first of eight victories in the 1952 season. Flock started on the pole, and drove his No. 91 1951 Hudson, sponsored by Ted Chester, to victory. He claimed his $1,025 winnings with only five drivers still running at the end of the race. Flock captured the pole position for the race in 27.78 seconds, with an average speed of 64.79 mph. The second event of the 1952 season took place on the famed 4.1 mile road course of Daytona Beach Speedway, and driver Marshall Teague took the victory in a 1952 Hudson. Herb Thomas led the first lap of the event, but Teague managed to lead laps 2 to 37. Twenty-thousand spectators witnessed 61 drivers start the event; but at the end of the race, only 10 cars were still running. The race was eventually halted on lap 37 due to the incoming tide which encroached on the beachfront straight off the track. The third event of the season took place at the half-mile dirt track of Speedway Park in Jacksonville, Florida. Marshall Teague won his second race in a row in the 200 lap, 100 mile contest, defeating the other 28 drivers.

On June 29, NASCAR traveled to Detroit, Michigan, for a scheduled 250-mile event, dubbed the "Motor Sports 250". The race was held at the Michigan State Fairgrounds Speedway; a one-mile dirt oval built in 1899. NASCAR offered its first five-figured purse, of $11,675, to the contestants, and driver Tim Flock came away with the winner's share of $5,050. Fans watched as Flock led laps 88 – 110, until driver Buddy Shuman took the lead for one lap on the 111th circuit. Flock, with the fourth and final lead change, on the next lap, went on to lead the remaining laps of the event. Shuman finished the event in second place, capturing a total of $2,225. The event concluded after four hours, with over half of the 47 contestants still running at the drop of the checkered flag.

For the 25th race of the season, fans and drivers assembled at the Darlington Raceway on September 1. The purse for the 400-lap, 500-mile event was $23,855; after six lead changes, and seven caution flags, Fonty Flock took home the winner's trophy with an average speed of 74.5 mph. Over 32,000 fans watched as Flock's victory in his number 14, 1952 Oldsmobile, netted him a $9,430 check for over 6.5 hours of driving. Flock started on the pole, and led the first 17 laps before the first lead change between four drivers. Flock recaptured the lead for the final time on lap 185. Eventual season champion Tim Flock and his No. 91 Hudson were involved in an accident on lap 321, but Flock stepped in and replaced driver Jack Smith in the No. 9. While Flock drove the No. 9 Hudson to an 11th-place finish, he was credited with finishing 34th of the 66 starters, and Smith was awarded the 11th place points.

Palm Beach Speedway both opened and closed the 1952 NASCAR season when it held the 34th and final event on October 30, 1952. Herb Thomas won three of the final four races in the season to finish second in the final standings. Thomas claimed the final victory of the season, winning the event with a two lap advantage over second-place Fonty Flock.

== 1952 Race schedule and results ==
No.	Date	Site	Winner	Make / model	Miles	Purse
1	January 20, 1952	W. Palm Beach	Tim Flock	1951 Hudson	100	$3,580
2	February 10, 1952	Daytona Beach	Marshall Teague	1952 Hudson	152	$6,110
3	March 6, 1952	Jacksonville	Marshall Teague	1952 Hudson	100	$3,675
4	March 30, 1952	North Wilkesboro	Herb Thomas	1952 Hudson	125	$3,550
5	April 6, 1952	Martinsville	Dick Rathmann	1951 Hudson	100	$3,500
6	April 12, 1952	Columbia	Buck Baker	1952 Hudson	100	$3,500
7	April 20, 1952	Atlanta	Bill Blair	1952 Oldsmobile	100	$3,645
8	April 27, 1952	Macon	Herb Thomas	1952 Hudson	99	$4,815
9	May 4, 1952	Langhorne	Dick Rathmann	1952 Hudson	150	$4,745
10	May 10, 1952	Darlington	Dick Rathmann	1951 Hudson	100	$3,550
11	May 18, 1952	Dayton	Dick Rathmann	1951 Hudson	100	$3,325
12	May 30, 1952	Canfield	Herb Thomas	1952 Hudson	100	$3,700
13	June 1, 1952	Augusta	Gober Sosebee	1952 Chrysler	77	$3,575
14	June 1, 1952	Toledo	Tim Flock	1951 Hudson	100	$3,550
15	June 8, 1952	Hillsboro	Tim Flock	1951 Hudson	100	$3,425
16	June 15, 1952	Charlotte	Herb Thomas	1952 Hudson	113	$3,550
17	June 29, 1952	Detroit	Tim Flock	1951 Hudson	250	$11,675
18	July 1, 1952	Stamford, Ontario	Buddy Shuman	1952 Hudson	100	$3,375
19	July 4, 1952	Owego	Tim Flock	1951 Hudson	100	$3,600
20	July 6, 1952	Monroe	Tim Flock	1952 Hudson	100	$3,325
21	July 11, 1952	Morristown	Lee Petty	1951 Plymouth	100	$3,750
22	July 20, 1952	South Bend	Tim Flock	1951 Hudson	100	$3,425
23	August 15, 1952	Rochester	Tim Flock	1952 Hudson	88	$3,550
24	August 17, 1952	Weaverville	Bob Flock	1951 Hudson	100	$3,635
25	September 1, 1952	Darlington	Fonty Flock	1952 Oldsmobile	500	$23,855
26	September 7, 1952	Macon	Lee Petty	1951 Plymouth	150	$4,865
27	September 14, 1952	Langhorne	Lee Petty	1951 Plymouth	250	$8,225
28	September 21, 1952	Dayton	Dick Rathmann	1951 Hudson	150	$5,550
29	September 28, 1952	Wilson	Herb Thomas	1952 Hudson	100	$3,500
30	October 12, 1952	Hillsboro	Fonty Flock	1952 Oldsmobile	150	$5,045
31	October 19, 1952	Martinsville	Herb Thomas	1952 Hudson	100	$3,675
32	October 26, 1952	North Wilkesboro	Herb Thomas	1952 Hudson	125	$3,625
33	November 16, 1952	Atlanta	Donald Thomas	1952 Hudson	100	$3,820
34	November 30, 1952	W. Palm Beach	Herb Thomas	1952 Hudson	100	$3,425

=== Individual races ===
==== West Palm Beach, FL.; Palm Beach Speedway ====
Race (1) Top 10 finishers

1. 91, Tim Flock
2. 42, Lee Petty
3. 14, Fonty Flock
4. 88, Frankie Schneider
5. 17, Buddy Shuman
6. 7, Frank Mundy
7. 787, Jim Millard
8. 86, Bill Davis
9. 9, Ed Samples
10. 36, Al Funderburk

==== Daytona Beach, FL; Daytona Beach Road Course ====
Race (2) Top 10 finishes

1. 6, Marshall Teague
2. 92, Herb Thomas
3. 99, Pat Kirkwood
4. 14, Fonty Flock
5. 51, Gober Sosebee
6. 2, Bill Blair
7. 40, Tommy Thompson
8. 57, Tommy Moon
9. 42, Lee Petty
10. 59, Lloyd Moore

==== Jacksonville, FL.; Speedway Park ====
Race (3) Top 10 finishes

1. 6, Marshall Teague
2. 92, Herb Thomas
3. 88, Frankie Schneider
4. 91, Tim Flock
5. 57, Tommy Moon
6. 14, Fonty Flock
7. 72, Donald Thomas
8. 47, Jim Reed
9. 1, Dick Eagan
10. 78, Bob Moore

==== North Wilkesboro, NC; North Wilkesboro Speedway ====
Race (4) Top 10 finishes; Wilkes County 200

1. 92 Herb Thomas
2. 14 Fonty Flock
3. 2 Bill Blair
4. 72 Donald Thomas
5. 126 Dave Terrell
6. Neil Cole
7. 17 Buddy Shuman
8. 60 Jim Paschal
9. 42 Lee Petty
10. Otis Martin

==== Martinsville, VA; Martinsville Speedway ====
Race (5) Top 10 finishes

1. 120 Dick Rathmann
2. 2 Bill Blair
3. 22 Perk Brown
4. 42 Lee Petty
5. Bobby Courtwright
6. Neil Cole
7. 38 Clyde Minter
8. 92 Herb Thomas
9. 88 Frankie Schneider
10. 60 Jim Paschal

==== Columbia NC.; Columbia Speedway ====
Race (6) Top 10 finishes

1. 89, Buck Baker
2. 42, Lee Petty
3. 120, Dick Rathmann
4. 88, Frankie Schneider
5. 82, Joe Eubanks
6. 72, Donald Thomas
7. 17, Buddy Shuman
8. 60, Jim Paschal
9. 77, Jack Smith
10. 18, Jimmy Florian

==== Atlanta, GA.; Lakewood Speedway ====
Race (7) Top 10 finishes

1. 2, Bill Blair
2. 9, Ed Samples
3. 42, Lee Petty
4. 89, Buck Baker
5. 118, Ed Benedict
6. 128, Charles Gattalia
7. 4, Fonty Flock
8. 92, Herb Thomas
9. 51, Gober Sosebee
10. 18, Jimmy Florian

==== Macon GA.; Central City Speedway ====
Race (8) Top 10 finishes

1. 92, Herb Thomas
2. 14, Fonty Flock
3. 9, Ed Samples
4. 89, Buck Baker
5. 51, Gober Sosebee
6. 60, Jim Paschal
7. 42, Lee Petty
8. 72, Donald Thomas
9. 91, Tim Flock
10. 128, Charles Gattalia

==== Langhorne, PA; Langhorne Speedway ====
Race (9) Top 10 finishes

1. 120, Dick Rathmann
2. 91, Tim Flock
3. 42, Lee Petty
4. 421, Jack Reynolds
5. 14, Fonty Flock
6. 89, Buck Baker
7. Tom Dawson
8. 126, Dave Terrell
9. Bud Farrell
10. 2, Bill Blair

==== Darlington, SC; Darlington Raceway ====
Race (10) Top 10 finishes

1. 120, Dick Rathmann
2. 91, Tim Flock
3. 14, Fonty Flock
4. 2, Jimmie Lewallen
5. 82, Joe Eubanks
6. 72, Donald Thomas
7. 42, Lee Petty
8. 11, Fireball Roberts
9. 41, Jim Paschal
10. 7, Frank Mundy

==== Dayton, OH; Dayton Speedway ====
Race (11) Top 10 finishes

1. 120, Dick Rathmann
2. 59, Lloyd Moore
3. 91, Tim Flock
4. 42, Lee Petty
5. 72, Donald Thomas
6. 82, Herb Thomas
7. 41, Jim Paschal
8. 128, Charles Gattalia
9. 421, Jack Reynolds
10. 22, Perk Brown

==== Canfield, OH; Canfield Speedway ====
Race (12) Top 10 finishes; Poor Man's 500

1. 92, Herb Thomas
2. 2, Bill Blair
3. 78, Bob Moore
4. 91, Tim Flock
5. 41, Curtis Turner
6. 82, Joe Eubanks
7. 44, Jimmie Lewallen
8. Bill Rexford
9. 93, Ted Chamberlain
10. Ernie Boost

==== Augusta, GA; Hayloft Speedway ====
Race (13) Top 10 finishes

1. 51, Gober Sosebee
2. 57, Tommy Moon
3. David Ezell
4. 17, June Cleveland
5. Jerry Wimbish
6. 16, Bill Snowden
7. 77, Weldon Adams
8. 126, Dave Terrell
9. 72, Donald Thomas
10. 9, Ed Samples

==== Toledo, OH.; Toledo Speedway ====
Race (14) Top 10 finishes

1. 91, Tim Flock
2. 120, Dick Rathmann
3. 42, Lee Petty
4. 44, Ray Duhigg
5. 14, Fonty Flock
6. 22, Perk Brown
7. 82, Joe Eubanks
8. Bud Farrell
9. 421, Jack Reynolds
10. Ralph Liguori

==== Hillsboro, NC.; Occoneechee Speedway ====
Race (15) Top 10 finishes

1. 91, Tim Flock
2. 14, Fonty Flock
3. 120, Dick Rathmann
4. 2, Bill Blair
5. Jimmie Lewallen
6. 42, Lee Petty
7. 82, Joe Eubanks
8. 44, Ray Duhigg
9. Clyde Minter
10. 72, Donald Thomas

==== Charlotte, NC; Charlotte Speedway ====
Race (16) Top 10 finishes

1. 92, Herb Thomas
2. 91, Tim Flock
3. 2, Bill Blair
4. 42, Lee Petty
5. 120, Dick Rathmann
6. 66, Donald Thomas
7. 82, Joe Eubanks
8. 89, Buddy Shuman
9. 17, June Cleveland
10. 19, Fred Dove

==== Detroit, MI; Michigan State Fairgrounds Speedway ====
Race (17) Top 10 finishes Motor City 250

1. 91, Tim Flock
2. 89, Buddy Shuman
3. 92, Herb Thomas
4. 2, Bill Blair
5. 99, Pat Kirkwood
6. 77, Dick Passwater
7. 3, Hershel McGriff
8. 73, Stewart Joyce
9. 4, Otis Martin
10. 34, Ted Chamberlain

==== Stamford, Ontario, Canada; Stamford Park ====
Seventeen cars competed in the event, only three were running at the end.

Race (18) Top 10 finishes

1. 89, Buddy Shuman
2. 92, Herb Thomas
3. 44, Ray Duhigg
4. 421, Jack Reynolds
5. Perk Brown
6. Neil Cole
7. Fonty Flock
8. 118, Bucky Sager
9. 93, Ted Chamberlain
10. Albert Lemieux

==== Owego, NY; Shangri-La Speedway ====
Race (19) Top 10 finishes

1. 91, Tim Flock
2. 92, Herb Thomas
3. 120, Dick Rathmann
4. 118, Bucky Sager
5. 42, Lee Petty
6. 59, Lloyd Moore
7. 44, Ray Duhigg
8. 421, Jack Reynolds
9. Neil Cole
10. Walt Carver

==== Monroe, MI; Monroe Speedway ====
Race (20) Top 10 finishes

1. 91, Tim Flock
2. 92, Herb Thomas
3. 42, Lee Petty
4. 14, Fonty Flock
5. 44, Ray Duhigg
6. 84, Red Duvall
7. 93, Ted Chamberlain
8. Iggy Katona
9. 162, Fred Bethune
10. Bob Moore

==== Morristown, NJ; Morristown Speedway ====
Race (21) Top 10 finishes

1. 42, Lee Petty
2. 91, Tim Flock
3. Neil Cole
4. Ralph Liguori
5. Ronnie Kohler
6. Pappy Hough
7. Nelson Applegate
8. Jim Reed
9. 93, Ted Chamberlain
10. Eddie Van Horn

==== South Bend, IN; Playland Park ====
Race (22) Top 10 finishes

1. 91, Tim Flock
2. 42, Lee Petty
3. 55, Bub King
4. 4, Herschel Buchanan
5. 77, Dick Passwater
6. 8, Gene Comstock
7. Glen Larsen
8. 94, J. O. Staton
9. 118, Bucky Sager
10. 84, Red Duvall

==== Rochester, NY; Monroe County Fairgrounds ====
Race (23) Top 10 finishes

1. 91, Tim Flock
2. 92, Herb Thomas
3. 120 Dick Rathmann
4. 42, Lee Petty
5. 7, Jim Reed
6. 8, Jimmie Lewallen
7. Yay Duhigg
8. 94, J. O. Staton
9. 118, Bucky Sager
10. 84, Red Duvall

==== Weaverville, NC; Asheville-Weaverville Speedway ====
Race (24) Top 10 finishes

1. 7, Bob Flock
2. 91, Tim Flock
3. 92, Herb Thomas
4. 8, Gene Comstock
5. 1, Herschel Buchanan
6. Barney Smith
7. 66, Donald Thomas
8. 71, Coleman Lawrence
9. 54, Weldon Adams
10. 89, Buck Baker

==== Darlington, SC; Darlington Raceway ====
Race (25) Southern 500 Top 10 finishes

1. 14, Fonty Flock
2. 58, Johnny Patterson
3. 92, Herb Thomas
4. 55, Bub King
5. 16, Banjo Matthews
6. 42, Lee Petty
7. 82, Joe Eubanks
8. 1, Herschel Buchanan
9. 87, Buck Baker
10. 24, Ray Duhigg

==== Macon, Ga; Central City Speedway ====
Race (26) Top 10 finishes

1. 42, Lee Petty
2. 92, Herb Thomas
3. 91, Tim Flock
4. 82, Joe Eubanks
5. 1, Herschel Buchanan
6. 32, Jimmie Lewallen
7. 66, Donald Thomas
8. Carson Dyer
9. 93, Ted Chamberlain
10. Barney Smith

==== Langhorne, PA; Langhorne Speedway ====
Race (27) Top 10 finishes

1. 42, Lee Petty
2. 2, Bill Blair
3. 1, Herschel Buchanan
4. 91, Tim Flock
5. 120, Dick Rathmann
6. 4, Slick Smith
7. Neil Cole
8. 24, Ray Duhigg
9. Jack Reynolds
10. 167, Elton Hildreth

==== Dayton, OH; Dayton Speedway ====
Top 10 finishes

1. 120, Dick Rathmann
2. 42, Lee Petty
3. 24, Ray Duhigg
4. 59, Lloyd Moore
5. 92, Herb Thomas
6. 91, Tim Flock
7. Iggy Katona
8. 77, Dick Passwater
9. 18, Ed Benedict
10. Herschel White

==== Wilson, NC; Wilson Speedway ====
Race (29) Top 10 finishes

1. 92, Herb Thomas
2. 42, Lee Petty
3. 2, Bill Blair
4. 12, Jim Paschal
5. 120, Dick Rathmann
6. 17, Buddy Shuman
7. 91, Tim Flock
8. 4, Slick Smith
9. 32, Jimmie Lewallen
10. 71, Coleman Lawrence

==== Hillsboro, NC; Occoneechee Speedway ====
Race (30) Top 10 finishes

1. 14, Fonty Flock
2. 9, Donald Thomas
3. 2, Bill Blair
4. 91, Tim Flock
5. 42, Lee Petty
6. 55, Bub King
7. 24, Ray Duhigg
8. 4, Slick Smith
9. 19, Fred Dove
10. George Bush

==== Martinsville, VA; Martinsville Speedway ====
Race (31) Top 10 finishes

1. 92, Herb Thomas
2. 14, Fonty Flock
3. 42, Lee Petty
4. 91, Tim Flock
5. 42, Lee Petty
6. 58, Johnny Patterson
7. 2, Bill Blair
8. Julian Petty
9. Clyde Minter
10. Cotton Owens
11. Ralph Liguori

==== North Wilkesboro, NC; North Wilkesboro Speedway ====
Race (32) Top 10 finishes

1. 9, Herb Thomas
2. 14, Fonty Flock
3. 92, Donald Thomas
4. 91, Tim Flock
5. 120, Dick Rathmann
6. Jimmie Lewallen
7. 22, Perk Brown
8. 19, Fred Dove
9. 55, Bub King
10. 71, Coleman Lawrence

==== Atlanta, GA; Lakewood Speedway ====
Race (33) Top 10 finishes

1. 9, Donald Thomas
2. 42, Lee Petty
3. 82, Joe Eubanks
4. 91, Tim Flock
5. 51, Gober Sosebee
6. 120, Jack Smith
7. George Bush
8. Ralph Liguori
9. 8, Gene Comstock
10. 55, Bub King

==== Palm Beach, FL; Palm Beach Speedway ====
Race (34) Top 10 finishers

1. 92 Herb Thomas
2. 14 Fonty Flock
3. 22 Perk Brown
4. 42 Lee Petty
5. Marion Edwards
6. Rags Carter
7. 13 Pop McGinnis
8. Ralph Liguori
9. 3 Allan Clarke
10. George Bush

== 1952 Grand National final standings ==
Pos.	Driver	Pts.	St	W	T5	T10	Poles
1	Tim Flock	6858.5	33	8	22	25	4
2	Herb Thomas	6752.5	32	8	19	22	10
3	Lee Petty	6498.5	32	3	21	27	0
4	Fonty Flock	5183.5	29	2	14	17	7
5	Dick Rathmann	3952.5	27	5	14	14	2
6	Bill Blair	3499	19	1	10	13	1
7	Joe Eubanks	3090.5	19	0	4	9	0
8	Ray Duhigg	2986.5	18	0	4	10	0
9	Donald Thomas	2574	21	1	5	14	1
10	Buddy Shuman	2483	15	1	3	7	0
11	Ted Chamberlain	2208	18	0	0	6	0
12	Buck Baker	2159	14	1	3	6	2
13	Perk Brown	2151.5	19	0	3	6	1
14	Jimmie Lewallen	2033	20	0	2	7	0
15	Bub King	1993	10	0	2	5	0
16	Herschel Buchanan	1868	5	0	4	5	0
17	Johnny Patterson	1708	5	0	2	2	0
18	Jim Paschal	1694	15	0	1	7	0
19	Neil Cole	1618	11	0	1	7	0
20	Lloyd Moore	1513.5	8	0	2	4	0

21. Gene Comstock

22. Banjo Matthews

23. Ralph Liguori

24. Jack Reynolds

25. Dick Passwater

26. Bucky Sager

27. Frankie Schneider

28. Otis Martin

29. Coleman Lawrence

30. Ed Samples

31. Fred Dove

32. Slick Smith

33. Iggy Katona

34. Jack Smith

35. Tommy Moon

36. Rollin Smith

37. Speedy Thompson

38. Jimmy Thompson

39. Bud Farrell

40. Weldon Adams

Other notable drivers with at least one start include: Curtis Turner, Louise Smith, Frank Mundy, Hershel McGriff, Marshall Teague, Nelson Stacy, Bill Rexford, Bob Welborn, Gober Sosebee, Bill Snowden, Fireball Roberts, George Bush, Al Keller, Bob Flock, Cotton Owens, Joe Weatherly, Smokey Yunick.
