= Rags Carter =

American racing driver

- Born: Wilson Alan Carter; December 2, 1928 Miami Springs, Florida, U.S.
- Died: May 23, 1993 (aged 64) Reading, Pennsylvania, U.S.
- Retired: 1980
- Debut season: 1947

Modified racing career
- Car number: 1, 4jr., p34, 44, 73
- Championships: 3
- Wins: 159+

NASCAR Cup Series career
- 1 race run over 1 year
- First race: 1952 Palm Beach Speedway
Wins	Top tens	Poles
0	1	0

W. Alan "Rags" Carter (December 2, 1928 – May 23, 1993) was an American stock car racing driver from Miami Springs, Florida. He won the 1965, 1966 and 1969 championships at the Nazareth Speedway in Pennsylvania.

== Racing career ==
In his early career, Carter was a frequent winner at the South Florida tracks, including Broward, Medley, and Palm Beach Speedways. In 1952, Carter came from last place to win the Florida Stock Car Championship at Opa-Locka Speedway, crossing the finish line on his roof after tangling with future NASCAR Hall of Fame inductee Banjo Matthews.

It was at Palm Beach that Carter made his only appearance in the NASCAR Grand National Series, finishing sixth. Carter spent the majority of his career racing in the Modified division, and in 1963 relocated to Pennsylvania, where he competed at the renowned tracks of the northeast, frequenting Orange County Fair (Victory) Speedway in New York and Reading Fairgrounds Speedway in Pennsylvania.

Carter was inducted into the Eastern Motorsports Press Association and the Northeast Dirt Modified Halls of Fame.

== Motorsports career results ==
=== NASCAR ===
(key) (Bold – Pole position awarded by qualifying time. Italics – Pole position earned by points standings or practice time. * – Most laps led.)

==== Grand National Series ====
NASCAR Grand National Series results
Year	Team	No.	Make	1	2	3	4	5	6	7	8	9	10	11	12	13	14	15	16	17	18	19	20	21	22	23	24	25	26	27	28	29	30	31	32	33	34	NWCC	Pts	Ref
1952		34	Plymouth	PBS; 6	DAB	JSP	NWS	MAR	CLB	ATL	CCS	LAN	DAR	DSP	CAN	HAY	FMS	HBO	CLT	MSF	NIF	OSW	MON	MOR	PPS	MCF	AWS	DAR	CCS	LAN	DSP	WIL	HBO	MAR	NWS	ATL	PBS		91.5	
