= George Bush (racing driver) =

Racing driver (1911–1967)

- Born: January 29, 1911; Hamburg, New York, U.S.
- Died: October 27, 1967 (aged 56)

NASCAR Cup Series career
- 5 races run over 1 year
- Best finish: 52nd (1952)
- First race: 1952 Race 27 (Langhorne)
- Last race: 1952 Race 34 (Palm Beach)
Wins	Top tens	Poles
0	3	0

George Bush (January 29, 1911 – October 27, 1967) was an American professional stock car racing driver.

== Racing career ==
Bush competed in five NASCAR Grand National Series races in 1952, all for owner A. J. Lorenzo. He made his debut at Langhorne Speedway in the No. 16 Oldsmobile, starting ninth and finishing 34th. He recorded his first top-ten at Occoneechee Speedway, where he finished tenth after starting 22nd. At the dirt track Lakewood Speedway, he switched to the No. 6, and finished a career-best seventh after qualifying 22nd.

== Motorsport career results ==
=== NASCAR ===
(key) (Bold – Pole position awarded by qualifying time. Italics – Pole position earned by points standings or practice time. * – Most laps led.)

==== Grand National Series ====
NASCAR Grand National Series results
Year	Team	No.	Make	1	2	3	4	5	6	7	8	9	10	11	12	13	14	15	16	17	18	19	20	21	22	23	24	25	26	27	28	29	30	31	32	33	34	NGNC	Pts
1952	A. J. Lorenzo	16	Olds	PBS	DAB	JAC	NWS	MAR	CLB	ATL	MGR	LAN	DAR	DAY	CAN	HAY	FMS	HBO	CLT	MSF	NIF	OSW	MON	MOR	PPS	MCF	ASW	DAR	MGR	LAN; 34	DAY	WIL	HBO; 10	MAR	NWS; 21			52nd	498
1952	A. J. Lorenzo	6	Olds																																	ATL; 7	PBS; 10	52nd	498
