= 1955 Richmond 200 =

Auto race held at Richmond Fairgrounds in 1955

Race details
- Race 16 of 45 in the 1955 NASCAR Grand National Series season
- Layout of Richmond Raceway
- Date: May 22, 1955
- Official name: Richmond 200
- Location: Richmond Fairgrounds, Richmond, Virginia
- Course: Permanent racing facility
- Course length: 0.542 miles (0.872 km)
- Distance: 200 laps, 100 mi (150 km)
- Weather: Temperatures of 78.1 °F (25.6 °C); wind speeds of 19 miles per hour (31 km/h)
- Average speed: 54.298 miles per hour (87.384 km/h)

Pole position
Driver	Arden Mounts	Arden Mounts

Most laps led
Driver	Tim Flock	Carl Kiekhaefer
- Laps: 123

Winner
No. 300	Tim Flock	Carl Kiekhaefer

Television in the United States
- Network: untelevised
- Announcers: none

The 1955 Richmond 200 was a NASCAR Grand National Series event that was held on May 22, 1955, at Richmond Fairgrounds (now Richmond Raceway) in Richmond, Virginia. Two hundred laps took place on a dirt track spanning 0.500 miles (0.805 km). The exact time of the race was one hour, fifty minutes, and thirty seconds.

Qualifying was rained out, so a draw for the pole position was held. All twenty-eight competitors were Americans. Individual race earnings for each driver ranged from $1,000 ($12,019 when considering inflation) to $50 ($601 when considering inflation); the total prize given to competitors was $4,085 ($49,096 when considering inflation).

== Background ==
In 1953, Richmond International Raceway began hosting the Grand National Series with Lee Petty winning that first race in Richmond. The original track was paved in 1968. In 1988, the track was re-designed into its present D-shaped configuration

The name for the raceway complex was "Strawberry Hill" until the Virginia State Fairgrounds site was bought out in 1999 and renamed the "Richmond International Raceway". The Strawberry Hill Races, which are a series of steeplechase horse races, were formerly held on the third Saturday of April at the Richmond Raceway Complex. In 2000, the races were moved to Colonial Downs in New Kent County, Virginia's first Thoroughbred racetrack.

== Race report ==
Tim Flock won the race; beating his brother Fonty. Flock would acquire his third consecutive win. They both were driving 1955 Chrysler 300s. Flock would lead the most laps with 123 out of 200. Jim Paschal would score his 100th career NASCAR Grand National Series start in this event. Sonny Hutchins would make his NASCAR Cup Series debut in this race. Notable crew chiefs for this race were E.K. Adkins.

Local NASCAR owners like Junie Donlavey and Emanuel Zervakis would refine Hutchins' stock car driving skills shortly after the conclusion of this race. Jimmie Lewallen (driving the 1955 model year Oldsmobile 88 machine) finished in last place (his record listed the reason as being stuck in the mud). The number 88 designation may or may not have been an indirect promotion to the Oldsmobile 88 vehicle, one of the hottest-selling vehicles during the mid-1950s.

Arden Mounts gained the pole from a draw. Henry Ford (no relation to the founder of the Ford Motor Company) would compete in the second-to-last race of his one-season career.

Other notable racers included: Lee Petty, Junior Johnson, and Billy Carden. The average speed of the race is 54.298 miles per hour (87.384 km/h). Most drivers owned their own vehicle. Local gas stations would often have stock cars ready for that day's NASCAR Cup Series racing event. Since the race took place on a dirt track, speeds were generally lower than those of the races that took place on paved oval courses.

=== Qualifying ===
Grid	No.	Driver	Manufacturer	Owner
1	18	Arden Mounts	'54 Hudson	Arden Mounts
2	3	Dick Rathman	'55 Chrysler	John Ditz
3	140	Mack Hanbury	'53 Hudson	Mack Hanbury
4	78	Jim Paschal	'55 Oldsmobile	Ernest Woods
5	54	Nace Mattingly	'55 Ford	Nace Mattingly
6	88	Jimmie Lewallen	'55 Oldsmobile	Ernest Woods
7	28	Eddie Skinner	'53 Oldsmobile	Frank Dodge
8	69	Volney Schulze	'54 Dodge	Volney Schulze
9	11	George Parrish	'53 Studebaker	George Parrish
10	301	Fonty Flock	'55 Chrysler	Carl Kiekhaefer
11	43	Slim Brown	'55 Chevrolet	unknown
12	53	Elmo Langley	'53 Oldsmobile	Elmo Langley
13	97-A	Sonny Hutchins	'54 Oldsmobile	J.M. Fitzgibbons
14	303	Henry Ford	'55 Chrysler	Henry Ford
15	8	Billy Carden	'55 Buick	Bishop Brothers
16	302	Carl Krueger	'55 Chrysler	Carl Krueger
17	71	Fred Dove	'55 Oldsmobile	Fred Dove
18	4	Ken Fisher	'55 Chrysler	Ken Fisher
19	44	Bob Welborn	'55 Chevrolet	Julian Petty
20	42	Lee Petty	'55 Chrysler	Petty Enterprises
21	89	Buck Baker	'55 Buick	Buck Baker
22	300	Tim Flock	'55 Chrysler	Carl Kiekhaefer
23	900	Johnny Roberts	'55 Chevrolet	Johnny Roberts
24	460	Gene Simpson	'55 Plymouth	Brooks Brothers
25	55	Junior Johnson	'55 Oldsmobile	Jim Lowe / Carl Beckham
26	98	Dave Terrell	'55 Oldsmobile	Dave Terrell
27	121	Harvey Henderson	'53 Hudson	Harvey Henderson
28	444	Chick Dawson	'55 Studebaker	unknown

== Finishing order ==
1. Tim Flock† (No. 300)
2. Fonty Flock† (No. 301)
3. Lee Petty† (No. 42)
4. Jim Paschal† (No. 78)
5. Junior Johnson (No. 55)
6. Bob Welborn (No. 44)
7. Gene Simpson (No. 460)
8. Elmo Langley† (No. 53)
9. Volney Schulze (No. 69)
10. George Parrish (No. 11)
11. Dave Terrell* (No. 98)
12. Slim Brown (No. 43)
13. Nace Mattingly (No. 54)
14. Johnny Roberts* (No. 900)
15. Arden Mounts† (#18)
16. Eddie Skinner* (No. 28)
17. Buck Baker*† (No. 89)
18. Harvey Henderson* (No. 121)
19. Henry Ford* (No. 303)
20. Mack Hanbury (No. 140)
21. Billy Carden*† (No. 8)
22. Carl Krueger* (No. 302)
23. Ken Fisher* (No. 4)
24. Dick Rathmann*† (No. 3)
25. Fred Dove*† (No. 71)
26. Sonny Hutchins*† (No. 97-A)
27. Chick Dawson* (No. 444)
28. Jimmie Lewallen*† (No. 88)

† signifies that the driver is known to be deceased
* Driver failed to finish race

== Timeline ==
Section reference:

- Start of race: Jim Paschal starts the race in the pole position.
- Lap 3: Jimmie Lewallen's vehicle somehow managed to get into the mud and could not get out.
- Lap 11: The fuel line in Chick Dawson's vehicle became severed.
- Lap 15: Sonny Hutchins' vehicle managed to overheat itself.
- Lap 59: Dick Rathman takes over the lead from Jim Paschal.
- Lap 64: The pistons on Fred Dove's vehicle came to a screeching halt.
- Lap 66: The driveshaft on Dick Rathmann's vehicle stopped working properly.
- Lap 67: Jim Paschal takes over the lead from Dick Rathman.
- Lap 78: Tim Flock takes over the lead from Jim Paschal.
- Lap 95: The tie rod came loose off Ken Fisher's vehicle.
- Lap 99: Carl Krueger's vehicle managed to lose its spindle.
- Lap 109: Billy Carden managed to overheat his vehicle.
- Lap 115: Both Harvey Henderson and Henry Ford had problems with their vehicle, forcing them not to finish the race.
- Lap 133: Buck Baker's wheel fell off his vehicle, causing him to leave the event.
- Lap 141: Eddie Skinner's vehicle bearings became problematic, ending his day on the track.
- Lap 145: Johnny Roberts' car overheated, ending his weekend on the track.
- Lap 172: Dave Terrell developed a problem with his car's piston, forcing him out of the race.
- Finish: Tim Flock was officially declared the winner of the event.

Preceded by 1955 untitled race at Martinsville Speedway	Grand National Series races 1955	Succeeded by 1955 untitled race at North Carolina State Fairgrounds
