= Dick Passwater =

NASCAR driver (1926–2020)

- Born: July 24, 1926; Indianapolis, Indiana, U.S.
- Died: July 10, 2020 (aged 93); Sarasota, Florida, U.S.

NASCAR Cup Series career
- 20 races run over 2 years
- Best finish: 25th (1952)
- First race: 1952 Motor City 250 (Michigan State Fairgrounds Speedway)
- Last race: 1953 Southern 500 (Darlington)
- First win: 1953 Race #5 (Charlotte Speedway)
Wins	Top tens	Poles
1	14	0

Richard Passwater (July 24, 1926 – July 10, 2020) was an American racecar driver who raced in NASCAR and USAC Stock Cars. He won the fifth race of the 1953 NASCAR Grand National Series (now NASCAR Cup Series) at Charlotte Speedway.

== Background ==
Passwater was born in Indianapolis, Indiana and he attended Danville Community High School. He served in the United States Navy between 1942 and 1945 during World War II and was a Presbyterian.

== Racing career ==
Passwater started racing after the war and was active in the 1950s and 1960s. He won the fifth race of the 1953 NASCAR Grand National Series season at Charlotte Speedway in his 1953 Oldsmobile. He won the race after most of the top contenders either fell out of the race or had to make a late pit stop at the 3/4 mile long dirt track. The race saw a then-record six drivers take the lead with 18 lead changes. He led three laps in his NASCAR career, all in this race at Charlotte. One of Passwater's Oldsmobiles is in a museum in Lansing, Michigan. He retired because car owner Frank Arford had died in a crash in Langhorne, PA while attempting to qualify for the race. Passwater returned home without a ride. He campaigned a self-owned Olds for his last race in the '53 Southern 500, finishing ninth. He raced in a USAC Stock Car during the 1960s.

== Life after racing ==
Passwater worked at car repair shops. He opened a car body repair shop named Passwater's Auto Specialists in Broad Ripple. He retired in 1996 and moved to Sarasota, Florida. Passwater died in July 2020, shortly before his 94th birthday.
