= Davenport Speedway =

Auto race track

Coordinates: 41°32′6″N 90°37′6″W

Mississippi Valley Fairgrounds Speedway
- Location: Mississippi Valley Fairgrounds, Davenport, Iowa
- Operator: Mississippi Valley Fair
- Address: 2815 Locust Street; Davenport, IA 52804
- Website: https://mvfair.com/

Oval
- Surface: Dirt
- Length: 0.5 mi (0.80 km)

Oval
- Surface: Dirt
- Length: 0.25 mi (0.40 km)

Davenport Speedway is a quarter-mile dirt race track located in Davenport, Iowa.

In 1953, the half-mile track which is no longer used, became the first track in Iowa to host a NASCAR sanctioned event, when it held a Grand National Series race. Fourteen cars participated in race. Buck Baker won the pole and Herb Thomas was victorious in the race.
