= Arden Mounts =

American racing driver (1917–2003)

Enoch Arden Mounts
- Arden Mounts (photograph taken in 1954)
- Born: July 9, 1917; Gilbert, West Virginia, U.S.
- Died: March 4, 2003 (aged 85); St. Mary's Hospital (Huntington, West Virginia, U.S.)
- Cause of death: Advanced age

NASCAR Cup Series career
- 37 races run over 4 years
- Best finish: 21st – 1954 NASCAR Grand National Series season
- First race: 1953 race (Hickory Motor Speedway)
- Last race: 1956 Southern 500 (Darlington Raceway)
Wins	Top tens	Poles
0	6	0

Enoch Arden Mounts (July 9, 1917 – March 4, 2003) was an American NASCAR Grand National Series driver from Gilbert, Mingo County, West Virginia. During his NASCAR career, Mounts competed in 34 races in driving Hudson cars and three races driving Pontiac cars.

== Career ==
Mounts raced in the NASCAR Grand National Series from 1953 to 1956. Like J.D. McDuffie, Alan Kulwicki, and Joe Nemechek, Mounts was an "independent" race car driver who would never receive manufacturer's support or the support of blockbuster sponsors.

Mounts would earn six finishes in the top-ten from the 37 races that he would compete in NASCAR. The 1954 Grand National season would see Mounts record his best championship finish at 21st place in the standings. During his career, Mounts would earn $2,505 in race winnings ($29,664.47 when adjusted for inflation) and race 4489 laps - the equivalent of 3,505.8 miles (5,642.0 km). Only the 1953 and 1956 NASCAR Cup Series seasons would see him finish better than he started in the races. Mounts would end up losing nearly one position on average from start to finish during his entire career.

Mounts' appearance at the 1955 Southern 500, where he would crash into Don Duckworth's stalled vehicle, would be captured on highlight films for generations. While Bill Champion managed to avoid Duckworth by swerving past the vehicle rapidly, Mounts managed to see the stalled vehicle too late and crashed into him in a very hard manner. The proper usage of seat belts on the stock car automobiles would save the lives of both Mounts and Duckworth.

The types of racing tracks that best favored Mounts was the dirt tracks where he finished an average of 18th place; intermediate tracks were very much a disadvantage to Mounts, where a finish of 42nd place was the career average for him.

== Death ==
Mounts would die while being a patient at St. Mary's Hospital, a medical center in Huntington, West Virginia.
