= Fred Dove =

American racing driver (1927–1990)

- Born: September 7, 1927; Martinsville, Virginia, U.S.
- Died: January 5, 1990 (aged 62)

NASCAR Cup Series career
- 47 races run over 4 years
- Best finish: 16th - 1953 Grand National season
- First race: 1952 untitled race (held on June 8 at Occoneechee Speedway)
- Last race: 1955 untitled race (held on May 29 at Forsyth County Fairgrounds)
Wins	Top tens	Poles
0	12	0

Fred Dove (September 7, 1927 – January 5, 1990) was an American NASCAR Grand National driver from Martinsville, Virginia, USA.

== Career ==
Dove competed in 47 races from (1952 to 1955) with one finish in the top-five, 12 top-ten finishes, and 3919 laps of racing experience - the equivalent of 2,667.7 miles (4,293.2 km). In his entire four-year career, Dove never won a race, led a lap, or started with a pole position. This driver started each race an average of 20th place and ended each race an average of 17th place. His total career earnings were $2,904 ($34,902.11 when adjusted for inflation) and his best season finish was in 1953.

Dove's best finishes were at dirt tracks where he would finish an average of 15th place. His worst finishes were on road courses where his average finishers were a mediocre 48th place.

Primarily competing for himself as a driver/owner, Dove's primary vehicle would become the #71 Oldsmobile.
