= Dick Meyer =

BBC executive producer

Dick Meyer is the Chief Washington Correspondent for the Scripps Washington Bureau and the author of Why We Hate Us: American Discontent in the New Millennium. He previously served as As Executive Producer for the BBC’s news services in America and Executive Editor for National Public Radio.

Meyer was born in Glencoe, Illinois, a suburb of Chicago. He graduated from Columbia University in New York in 1980 with a bachelor's degree in religion and from the University of Oxford in 1982 with a master's degree in politics.

Meyer began his journalism career as an election-unit researcher in 1985 for CBS News, covered the 1988 presidential campaign as an off-air producer, and filed reports for CBS Radio News. He spent over twenty-three years at CBS News, eventually serving as a producer for the CBS Evening News with Dan Rather and later, editorial director of CBS News online.

In 2008, Meyer joined NPR as Editorial Director for Digital Media and played a key role in expanding the organization’s digital journalism and integrating the broadcast and digital newsrooms. From 2009 to 2011, he served as NPR’s Executive Editor, with responsibility for managing NPR's worldwide news operation on-air and online.

As Executive Producer for the BBC’s news services in America, Meyer oversaw editorial of the BBC World News America and the US edition of BBC News Online. He also advised on the strategy and production of other BBC news content in the US, including its 24-hour news channel BBC World News, and BBC World Service radio productions aimed at US audiences.

Meyer currently works on DecodeDC, a new multi-platform feature produced at the Scripps Washington Bureau, and also writes more broadly about Washington.

Meyer is the recipient of an Alfred I. du Pont-Columbia University Award, an Investigative Reporters and Editors Award, and a Sigma Delta Chi Society of Professional Journalists Award. In 2011, Meyer received the Francis R. Stanton Alumni Recognition award from North Shore Country Day School. He lives in the Washington DC metro area with his wife and two children.
