= Johnny Patterson (racing driver) =

American racing driver (died 1969)

- Born: Huntington, West Virginia, U.S.
- Died: July 5, 1969

NASCAR Cup Series career
- 25 races run over 6 years
- Best finish: 17th – 1952 NASCAR Grand National Series season
- First race: 1952 race at Asheville-Weaverville Speedway
- Last race: 1959 Southern 500
Wins	Top tens	Poles
0	6	0

Johnny Patterson (died July 5, 1969) was a NASCAR Grand National Series driver from Huntington, West Virginia.

== Summary ==
Patterson drove from 1952 to 1959 and scored four "top-five" finishes and six "top-ten" finishes. He completed 3,255 laps while earning $6,303 in his career. Patterson started an average of 22nd while finishing an average of 21st place over six years.

Patterson improved on his 25th place start at the 1954 Southern 500 to finish in 14th place; taking home $225 in winnings. At the 1955 Southern 500, Patterson qualified in 46th place in his 1955 Mercury vehicle only to finish the race in 22nd place out of 69 drivers; collecting $225. The following year at the 1956 Southern 500, Patterson qualified in 25th place and ended up finishing in 14th place out of 70 drivers; collecting another $225 for his work.

Short tracks were Patterson's specialty, as he finished an average of 18th place. His troubles came mostly at road courses where a 50th-place finish was par for the course. Patterson liked Piedmont Interstate Fairgrounds where he finished in fifth place but strongly disliked Daytona Beach and Road Course, where he would finish in 50th place.

Patterson was mostly associated with the No. 55 Chevrolet owned by Bernard Friedland. He would also drive for the Hudson, Oldsmobile and Mercury brands.
