= Slick Smith =

American racing driver (1929–1997)

- Born: Ebenezer Smith; August 17, 1929; Atlanta, Georgia, U.S.
- Died: January 27, 1997 (aged 67)

NASCAR Cup Series career
- 50 races run over 7 years
- Best finish: 12th (1953)
- First race: 1949 Race No. 1 (Charlotte)
- Last race: 1955 Race No. 36 (Montgomery)
Wins	Top tens	Poles
0	18	1

Ebenezer "Slick" Smith (August 17, 1929 – January 27, 1997) was an American stock car racing driver. A native of Atlanta, Georgia, he was competitor in the NASCAR Grand National Series (now NASCAR Cup Series) and competed in the first-ever series race in 1949.

Smith was one of the first drivers to receive sponsorship from a car manufacturer, running the 1950 race at North Wilkesboro Speedway in a Nash Ambassador previously driven by Bill France Sr. and Curtis Turner in the 1947 Carrera Panamericana.
