= Donald Thomas (racing driver) =

American racing driver (1932–1977)

- Born: July 10, 1932; Olivia, North Carolina, U.S.
- Died: December 16, 1977 (aged 45); Sanford, North Carolina, U.S.

NASCAR Cup Series career
- 79 races run over 7 years
- 1956 position: 110th
- Best finish: 9th (1952)
- First race: 1950 Race No. 4 (Martinsville)
- Last race: 1956 Race No. 11 (Langhorne)
- First win: 1952 Race No. 33 (Atlanta)
Wins	Top tens	Poles
1	37	1

Donald Thomas (July 10, 1932 – December 16, 1977) was an American professional stock car racing driver. The younger brother of Herb Thomas, he made 79 NASCAR Grand National Series starts, scoring one win and one pole position.

== Racing career ==
Thomas' NASCAR Grand National Series career spanned from his season in 1950 with age of 17 to 1956 with age of 23, although the bulk of his starts came between 1951 and 1954. Thomas won the season's penultimate contest in 1952, capturing the checkered flag at Lakewood Speedway, taking the lead from his brother Herb in the closing stages of the race after the latter ran into mechanical trouble. In doing so, he became NASCAR's youngest winner, a record that stood until Kyle Busch's 2005 triumph at Auto Club Speedway.

== Personal life ==
Thomas' childhood was spent on the family tobacco farm. He was married and had two sons and two daughters. He died in December 1977 and was buried near his home in Sanford, North Carolina.
