= Gene Comstock =

American racing driver (1910–1981)

Eugene H. "Gene" Comstock
- Born: February 20, 1910; Red House, West Virginia, U.S.
- Died: February 1, 1981 (aged 70); Huntington, West Virginia, U.S.

NASCAR Cup Series career
- 29 races run over 6 years
- Best finish: 18th (1953)
- First race: 1950 Southern 500 (Darlington)
- Last race: 1955 Southern 500 (Darlington)
Wins	Top tens	Poles
0	6	0

Eugene H. Comstock (February 21, 1910 – February 1, 1981) was an American NASCAR Grand National Series driver from Chesapeake, Ohio, US.

== Career ==
Comstock started driving race cars in the 1930s, and drove until the late 1960s. Comstock drove midget, sprints, super-modified, and stock cars. He had many wins on the short tracks around the country and was considered by many to be one of the top drivers from his area.

In his career spanning from 1950 to 1955, Comstock racked up one top-five position, six top-ten positions, 3038.6 miles of racing experience, and $2,549 ($30,635.5 when adjusted for inflation) in take home pay. He competed in the 1955 Southern 500 in a 1954 Hudson Hornet as a driver/owner.

Comstock was one of the drivers who raced in the first Darlington race in 1950. He competed in a new Oldsmobile purchased by a bootlegger from Ironton, Ohio. He finished 18th in the race. According to the Darlington newspaper, at 125 miles, Johnny Mantz was leading with Fireball Roberts in second and Comstock in third. Harold Brasington (track owner) was reported to have told Comstock after the race that he thought he was going to win the race until he broke the right front hub around the 425th mile of the race.
