= Clyde Minter =

American racing driver (1921–1971)

- Born: Clyde Dillard Minter; October 15, 1921
- Died: December 21, 1971 (aged 50)

NASCAR Cup Series career
- 42 races run over 7 years
- Best finish: 14th (1949)
- First race: 1949 Race 6 (Martinsville)
- Last race: 1955 Race 1 (High Point)
Wins	Top tens	Poles
0	19	0

Clyde Dillard Minter (October 15, 1921 – December 21, 1971) was an American stock car racing driver. Minter competed in 42 NASCAR Grand National Series races between 1949 and 1955, where he reached the top-ten a total of 19 times. Minter died on December 21, 1971.
