= Joe Eubanks =

American racing driver (1925–1971)

Joseph "Joe" Eubanks
- Eubanks, circa 1950s
- Born: August 9, 1925; Spartanburg, South Carolina, U.S.
- Died: June 21, 1971 (aged 45)

NASCAR Cup Series career
- 159 races run over 11 years
- Best finish: 5th (1954)
- First race: 1950 Southern 500 (Darlington Raceway)
- Last race: 1961 World 600 (Charlotte Motor Speedway)
- First win: 1958 untitled race (Orange Speedway)
Wins	Top tens	Poles
1	81	4

Joseph Eubanks (August 9, 1925 – June 21, 1971) was an American NASCAR Grand National driver from Spartanburg, South Carolina. He entered the United States Armed Forces along with fellow NASCAR veterans Bud Moore and Cotton Owens. All three of these men served in World War II together.

== Career summary ==
Eubanks raced from 1950 to 1961 collecting one win, thirty-seven finishes in the top-five, and eighty-one finishes in the top-ten along the way. His total career earnings were $35,338 ($380,729.57 when adjusted for inflation) and he successfully completed 14,303.3 miles (23,018.9 km) of racing.

As one of the first competitors to compete in a NASCAR road racing event, Eubanks finished second to Al Keller who was driving a 1951 Hudson Hornet automobile. Joe was a competitor for the 1955 Southern 500 and was credited for having the fastest Oldsmobile 88 vehicle of that particular race. Dirt tracks were Eubanks' greatest strong point as a driver; where a "top-ten" finish were frequent. Superspeedway tracks turned out to be his weakness as his average finish on those tracks was 38th place.

Eubanks' primary vehicle was the #88 Ford machine owned by Don Every and Domenic Petti of Daytona Florida. He was also one of the extras for the 1960 stock car racing film Thunder in Carolina.
