= Tri-City Speedway =

Auto race track

Coordinates: 41.4973°N 79.7844°W

Tri-City Raceway Park (formerly known as Tri-City Speedway and Franklin Speedway) is a 1/2-mile dirt oval and a 3/8-mile track for karts, located in Oakland Township, Venango County, Pennsylvania, near the city of Franklin to the southwest. It lies even closer to the Borough of Sugarcreek, which lies in between. Also lying at about the same distance as Franklin is Oil City to the southeast. Tri-City has hosted several World of Outlaws Late Models events; one (now defunct) National Sprint Tour race, Super DIRTcar Series and several All-Star Circuit of Champions races.

Tri City Raceway originally opened in 1954 as a 1/4 mile dirt oval, the track remained in this configuration until 1968.

In 1969, the track reopened as a 1/2 mile oval where it held races until it closed in 1981 after a fire destroyed the main concession stand and majority of the bleachers.

The track closed for a while in 1988 but reopened in 1996 with Roger Crick and Mike Graham as the owners and has seen success.

The speedway was purchased by H & H Motorsports in 2010. The new owners closed the auto racing program in July 2011. Kart racing and some special events continued through 2011. Mark Tatalovic brought the track back to life in 2016.

Drivers such as Jeff Gordon, Kenny Wallace, Steve Kinser, Ken Schrader and Dave Blaney have raced at the track.

After a short run of the track, it was once again place up for sale. In the fall of 2019, the facility was purchased by Merle Black, of Mercer, PA. Track and facility improvements have already began with great anticipation, towards the 2020 racing season.
