= Occoneechee Speedway =

American auto racing venue

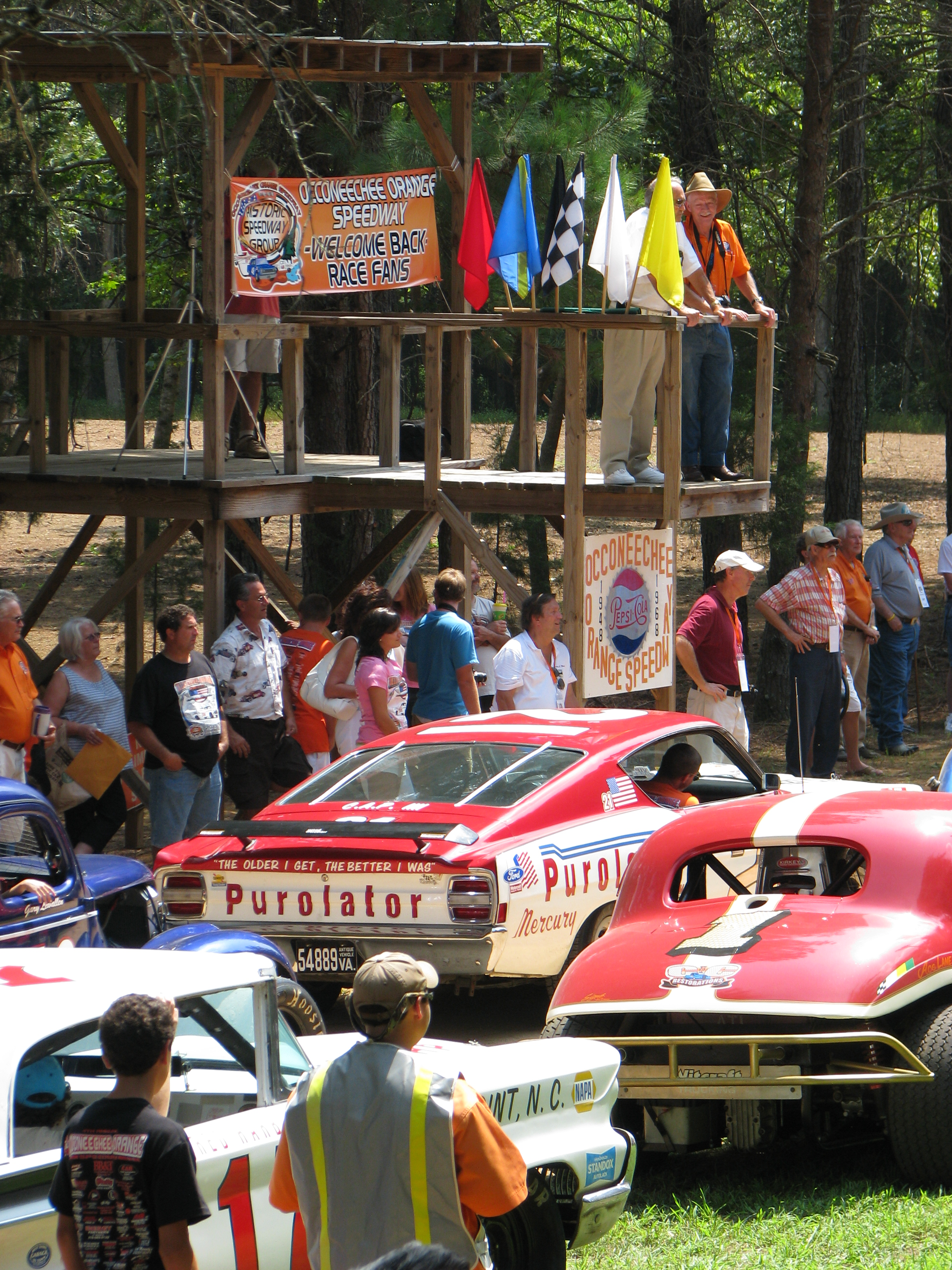
- Revitalized flag stand - 2010 Car Show
- Location: Elizabeth Brady, 0.3 N of US 70 Business, Hillsborough, North Carolina, United States
- Owner: Classical American Homes Preservation Trust
- Opened: May 5, 1947
- Closed: June 1968
- Former names: Orange Speedway (1954–1968)
- Major events: Hillsboro 150 (1949–1968)

Oval
- Surface: Dirt
- Length: 0.93 mi (1.5 km)
- Turns: 4
- Occoneechee Speedway
- U.S. National Register of Historic Places
- Location within North Carolina
- Coordinates: 36°4′23″N 79°4′57″W
- Area: 44 acres (18 ha)
- NRHP reference No.: 02000435
- Added to NRHP: May 2, 2002

Occoneechee Speedway, later known as Orange Speedway was one of the first two NASCAR tracks to open. It closed in 1968 and is the only dirt track remaining from the inaugural 1949 season.

It is located just outside the town of Hillsborough, North Carolina.

== Site history ==
=== Occoneechee Speedway / Orange Speedway ===
The Occoneechee Farm occupied the land in the late 19th century. The farm was named after the Occaneechi Indians that lived in the area in the late 17th century and late 18th century. The landowner, Julian S. Carr, raced horses, and built a half mile horse racing track on the site.

Bill France Sr. noticed the horse racing track and expanse of open land while piloting his airplane. On the site of the earlier horse track, he built a 0.9-mile dirt track in September 1947, two months before NASCAR was organized. In its earliest days, Fonty Flock and his brothers Bob and Tim dominated the track. Louise Smith became NASCAR's first female driver at the track in the fall of 1949. The Occoneechee Speedway hosted stock car racing legends such as Fireball Roberts, Richard Petty, Ned Jarrett and Junior Johnson. It was a crown jewel in NASCAR for most of its existence.

The track was renamed Orange Speedway on April 10, 1954. The original name was considered too difficult for media use, such that an Associated Press report quipped the new moniker was to "accommodate long-suffering newspaper headline writers and radio men."

The Sunday racing schedule prompted grassroots opposition in Hillsborough, and the final race at the track was a Richard Petty victory on September 15, 1968.

The loss of the speedway later made Bill France Sr. look for a new spot in the area to build a bigger, better, and faster track with speeds in excess of Daytona International Speedway. Eventually he looked towards South Carolina and eventually Alabama where he built the Talladega Superspeedway which opened a year later where it took Occoneechee Speedway's date on the schedule.

The Occoneechee/Orange speedway, along with North Wilkesboro Speedway, is one of the inspirations for the dirt track Thomasville Speedway in the Pixar movie Cars 3 in which Petty voices the character Strip Weathers.

The track was featured on the Peacock original series, Lost Speedways hosted by NASCAR Hall of Famer, Dale Earnhardt Jr. and Matthew Dillner.

=== Historic Occoneechee Speedway Trail ===
The Occoneechee Speedway site is now heavily forested with pines and sycamores. A short walk from Hillsborough via wooded footpaths, the site is a common destination for residents going for a stroll. The grandstands are still visible, as is much of the mile–long oval track. It was placed on the National Register of Historic Places and now comprises 44 acres (180,000 m^{2}) with over 3 miles (4.8 km) of trails. A walking trail was built in 2003 that crisscrosses the clay track. A non-profit local group, The Historic Speedway Group, continues to organize volunteers to renovate historic structures and maintain the track and trails. The group has collected an impressive archive of videos, photographs, and historical information about the site.

In 2022, the site, owned by the Classical American Homes Preservation Trust, was transferred to state ownership to become part of Eno River State Park.

== Winners ==
Race	Date	Cars	Winner	Make / Model	Length	Miles	Purse	Pole	Speed (mph)
1949-03	08/07/49	28	Bob Flock	1948 Oldsmobile	1.000	200	$5,000	76.800	
1950-10	08/13/50	27	Fireball Roberts	1949 Oldsmobile	1.000	100	$3,975		
1950-19	10/29/50	29	Lee Petty	1949 Plymouth	1.000	175	$4,675	85.898	
1951-05	04/15/51	33	Fonty Flock	1950 Oldsmobile	1.000	95	$4,665	88.287	80.889
1951-31	10/07/51	24	Herb Thomas	1951 Hudson	1.000	150	$3,550	79.628	72.454
1952-15	06/08/52	19	Tim Flock	1951 Hudson	1.000	100	$3,425	91.977	81.008
1952-30	10/12/52	29	Fonty Flock	1952 Oldsmobile	1.000	150	$5,045	75.901	73.489
1953-26	08/09/53	19	Curtis Turner	1953 Oldsmobile	1.000	100	$3,425	89.078	75.125
1954-08	04/18/54	28	Herb Thomas	1954 Hudson	1.000	100	$3,825	86.767	77.386
1955-07	03/27/55	21	Jim Paschal	1955 Oldsmobile	1.000	100	$3,800	91.896	82.304
1955-45	10/30/55	25	Tim Flock	1955 Chrysler	1.000	100	$4,285	81.673	70.465
1956-17	05/13/56	31	Buck Baker	1956 Chrysler	.900	90	$4,285	89.305	83.720
1956-50	09/30/56	23	Fireball Roberts	1956 Ford	.900	99	$4,560	88.067	72.734
1957-07	03/24/57	19	Buck Baker	1957 Chevrolet	.900	99	$3,835	87.828	82.233
1958-06	03/23/58	18	Buck Baker	1957 Chevrolet	.900	99	$3,585	83.076	78.502
1958-47	09/28/58	33	Joe Eubanks	1957 Pontiac	.900	99	$3,885	87.308	72.439
1959-04	03/01/59	22	Curtis Turner	1959 T-Bird	.900	99	$3,785	87.544	81.612
1959-40	09/20/59	22	Lee Petty	1959 Plymouth	.900	99	$3,945	85.533	77.868
1960-18	05/29/60	23	Lee Petty	1960 Plymouth	.900	99	$3,985	88.190	83.583
1960-39	09/18/60	18	Richard Petty	1960 Plymouth	.900	99	$3,785	85.285	80.161
1961-11	04/02/61	20	Cotton Owens	1960 Pontiac	.900	99	$3,895	91.836	84.695
1961-52	10/29/61	20	Joe Weatherly	1961 Pontiac	.900	149	$5,625	95.154	85.249
1961-62	1/7/62	19	Josh Arnold	1961 Ford	.900	500	$5,580	25.190	170.941
1962-09	03/18/62	21	Rex White	1961 Chevrolet	.900	99	$4,575	96.285	86.948
1963-10	03/10/63	23	Junior Johnson	1963 Chevrolet	.900	149	$6,900	95.716	83.129
1963-54	10/27/63	24	Joe Weatherly	1963 Pontiac	.900	150	$6,650	93.156	85.559
1964-15	04/12/64	27	David Pearson	1964 Dodge	.900	150	$6,800	99.784	83.319
1964-55	09/20/64	28	Ned Jarrett	1964 Ford	.900	150	$7,000	89.280	86.725
1965-08	03/14/65	23	Ned Jarrett	1965 Ford	.900	150	$6,600	98.570	90.663
1965-53	10/24/65	20	Dick Hutcherson	1965 Ford	.900	101	$4,540	98.810	87.462
1966-45	09/18/66	23	Dick Hutcherson	1966 Ford	.900	150	$6,600	95.716	90.603
1967-44	09/17/67	28	Richard Petty	1967 Plymouth	.900	150	$6,850	94.159	81.574
1968-43	09/15/68	24	Richard Petty	1968 Plymouth	.900	150	$6,900	93.245	87.681

== Gallery ==
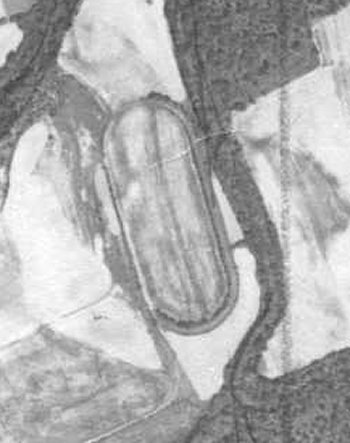
The horse racetrack on Occoneechee farm, 1938

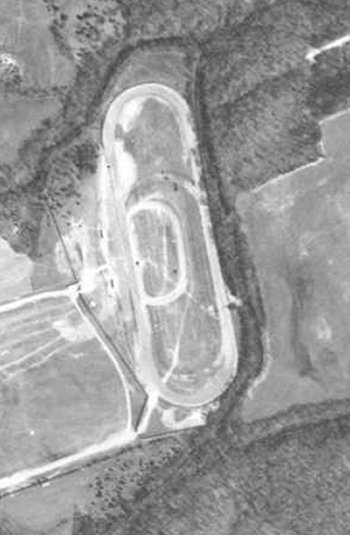
Aerial view of Occoneechee Speedway in 1955

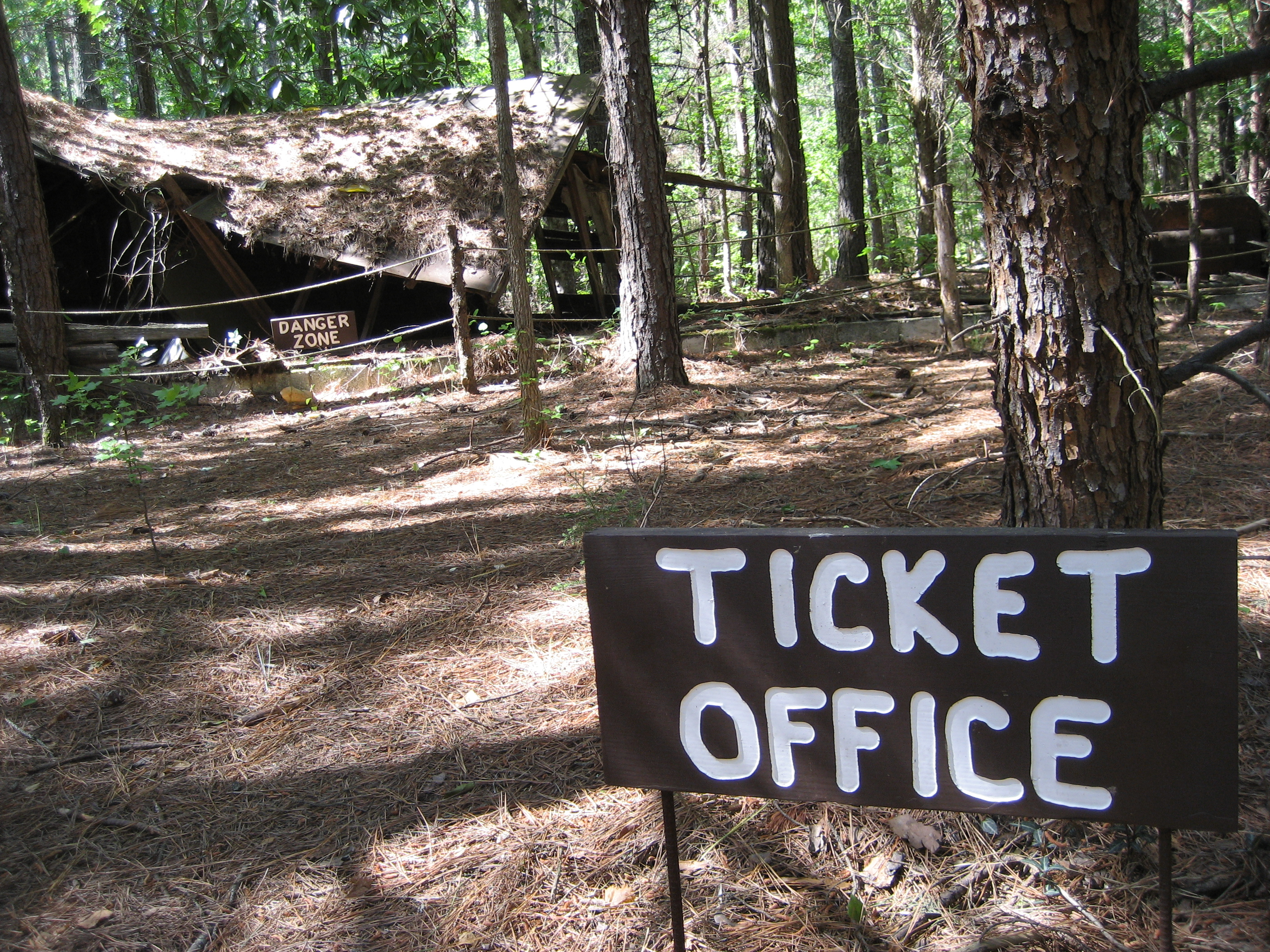
Former ticket office

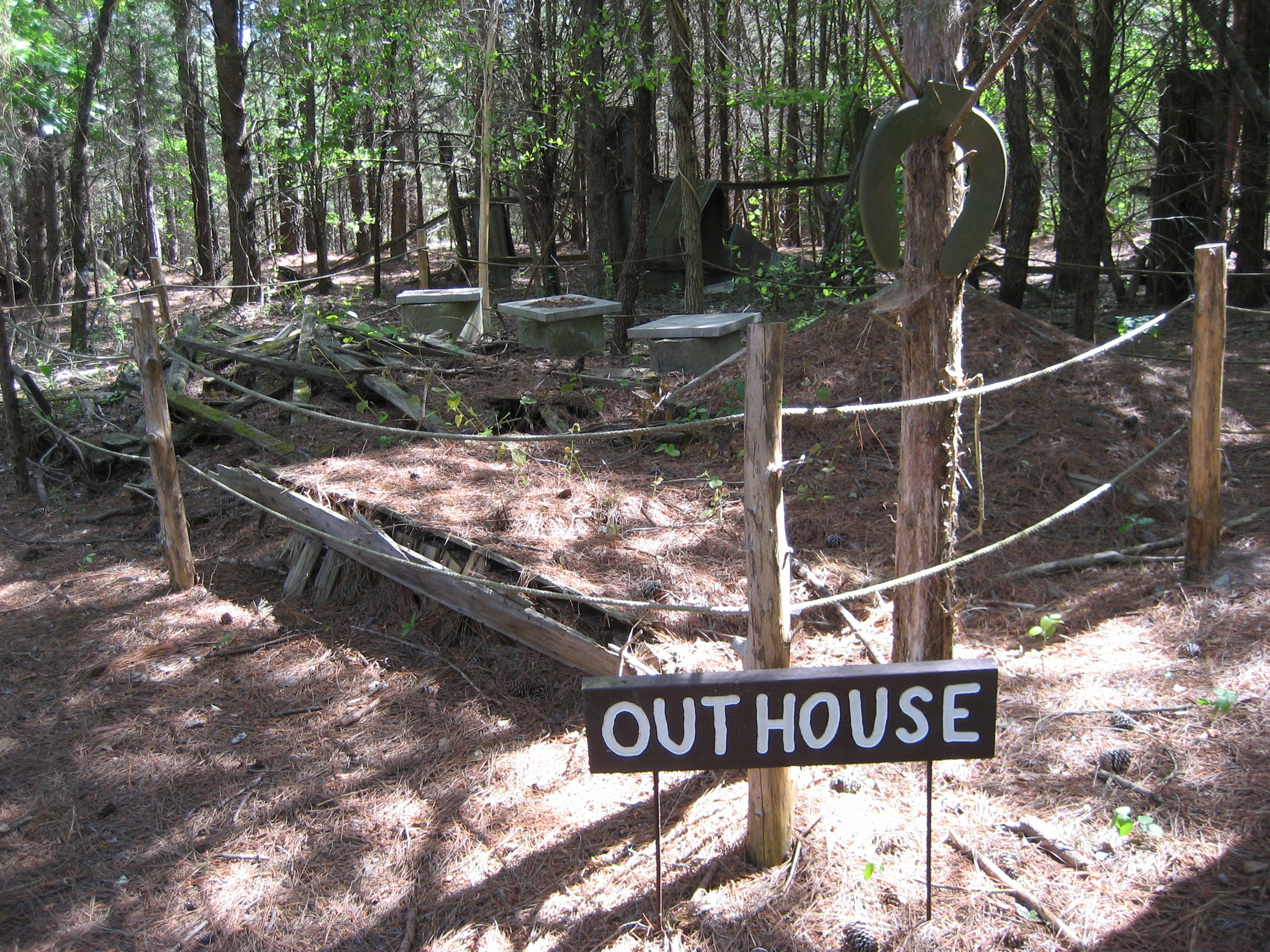
Former outhouse location

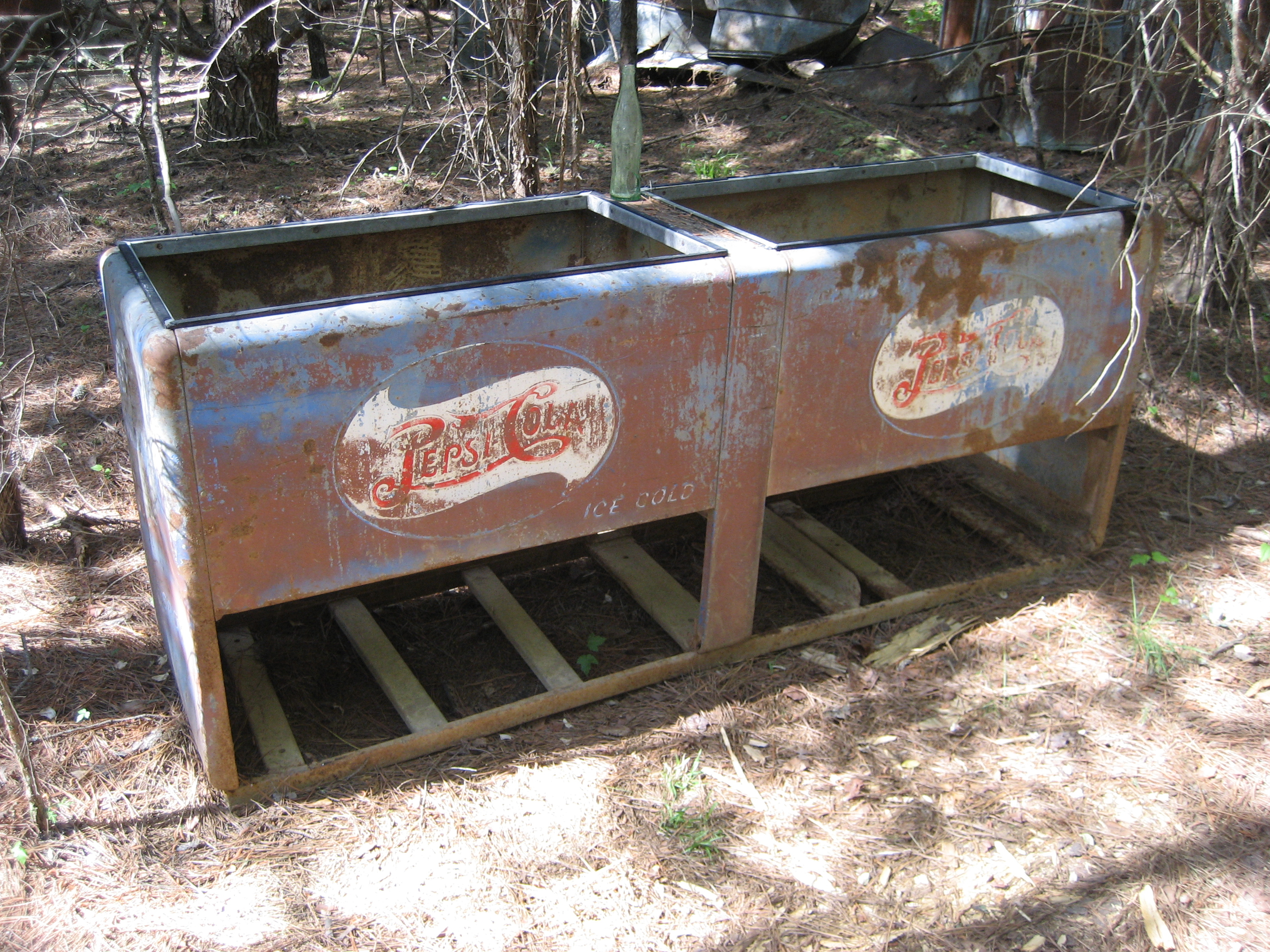
Pepsi coolers at the concession area

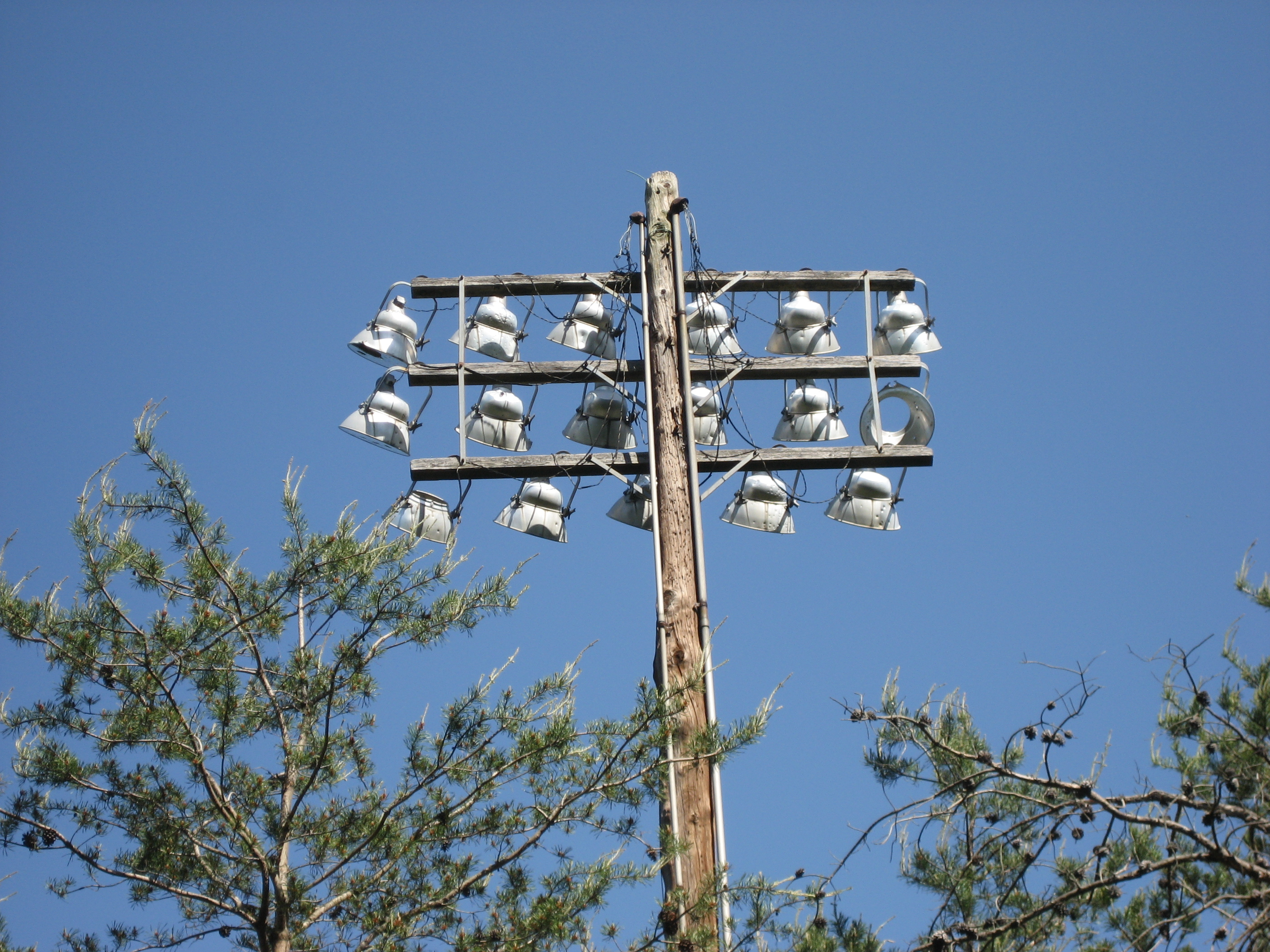
View of the grandstand lights

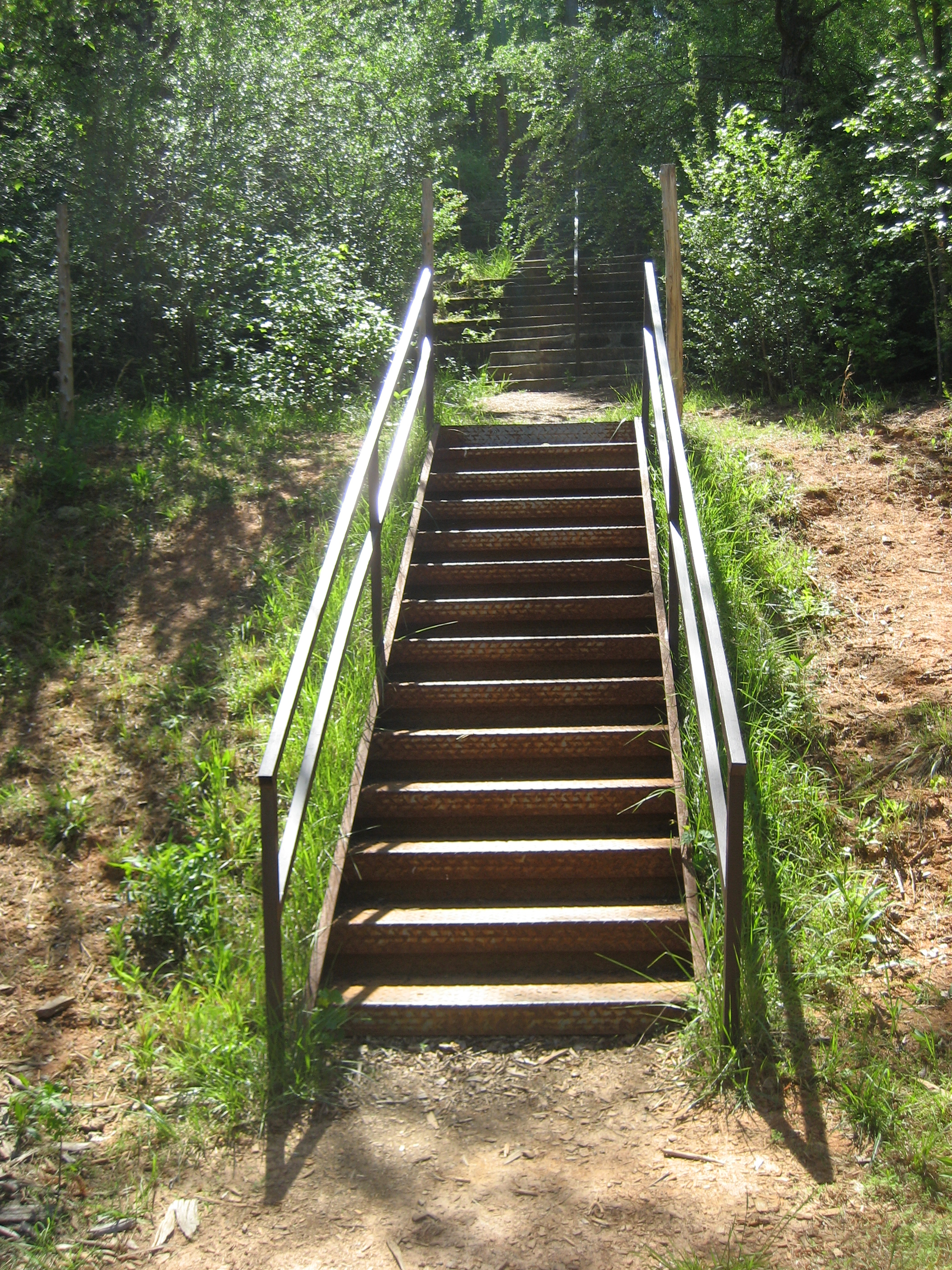
Stairs leading from the track level through the grandstands

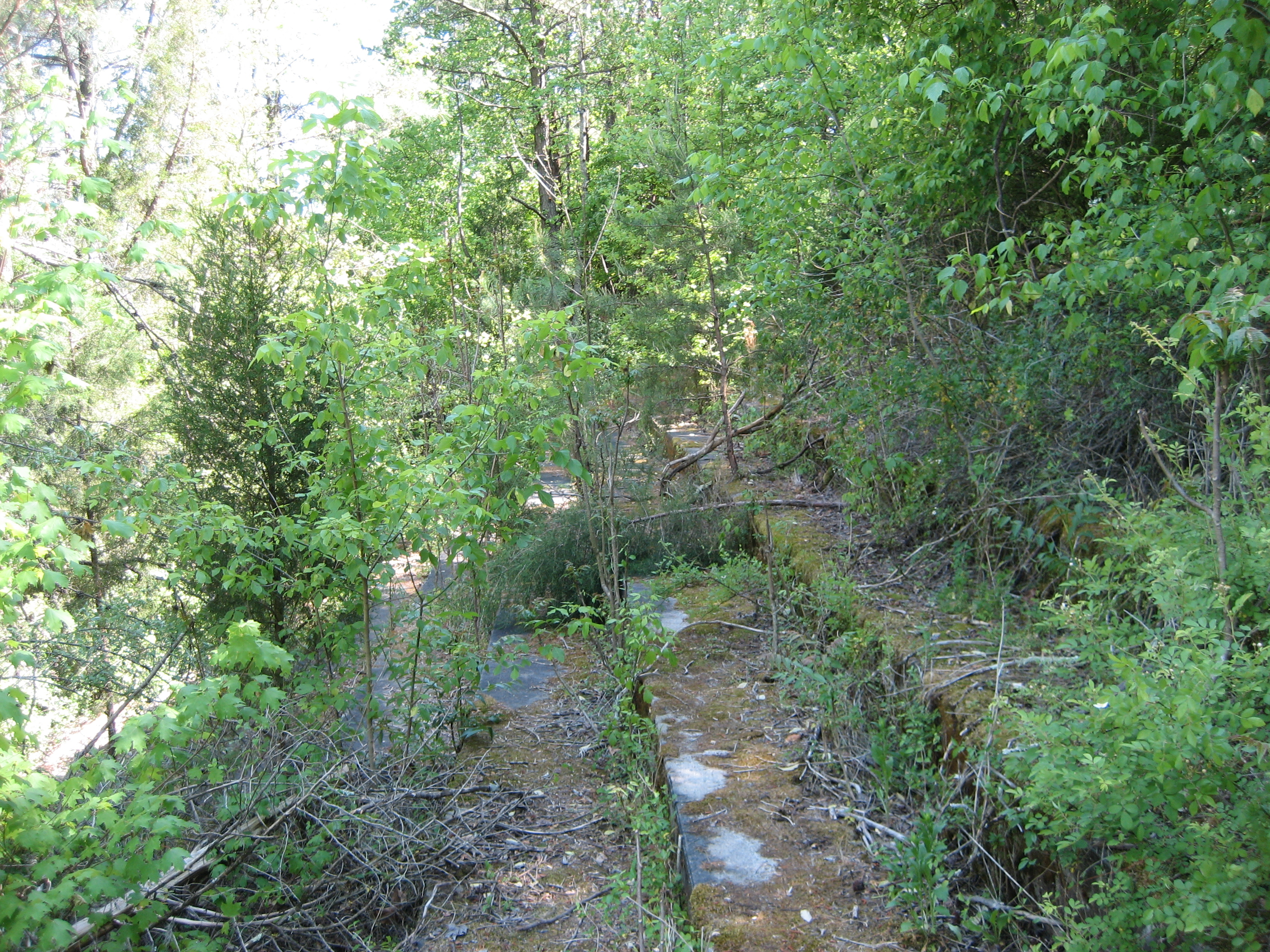
Overgrowth covers the remains of the grandstand

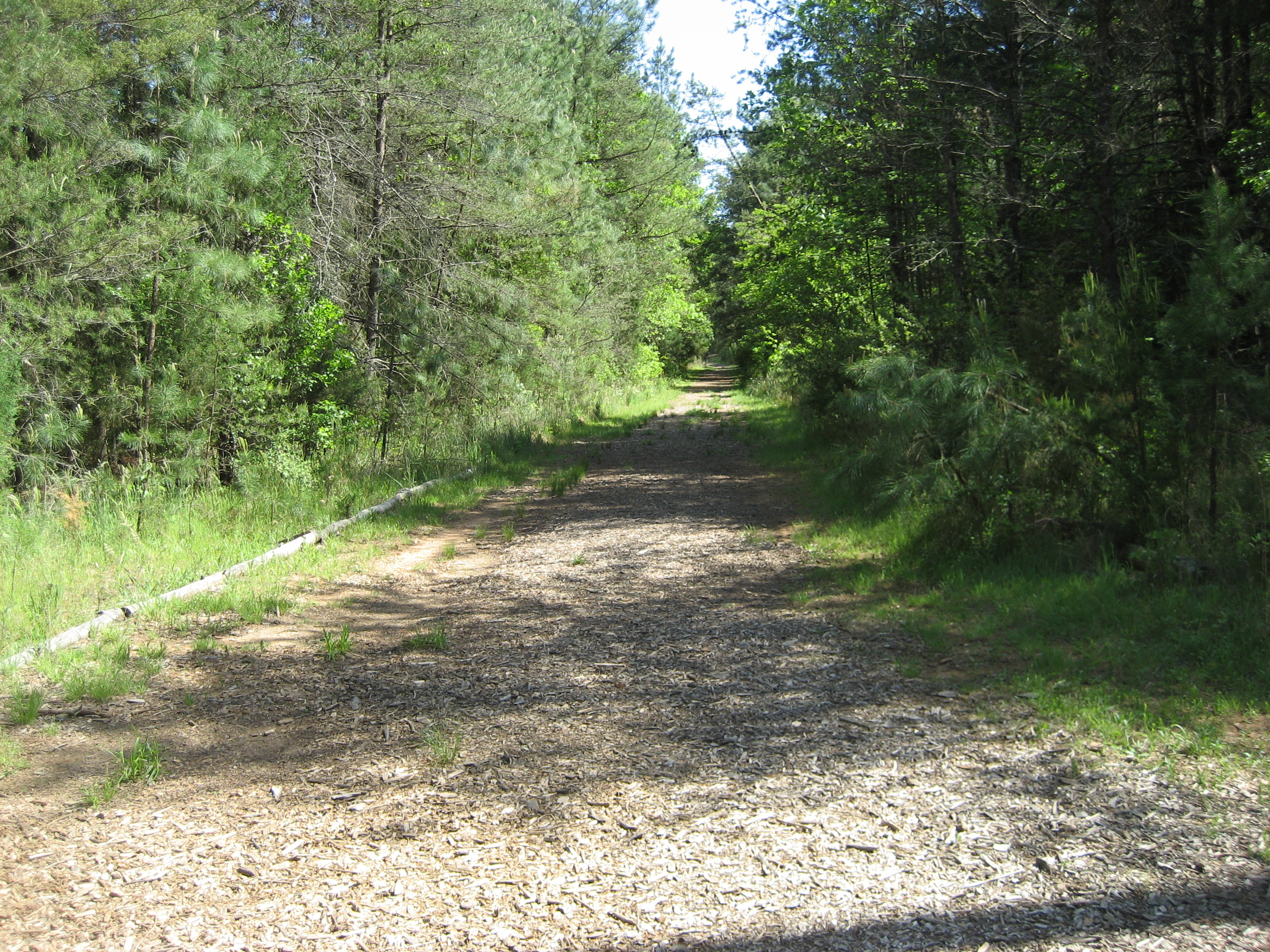
The track around the start/finish line

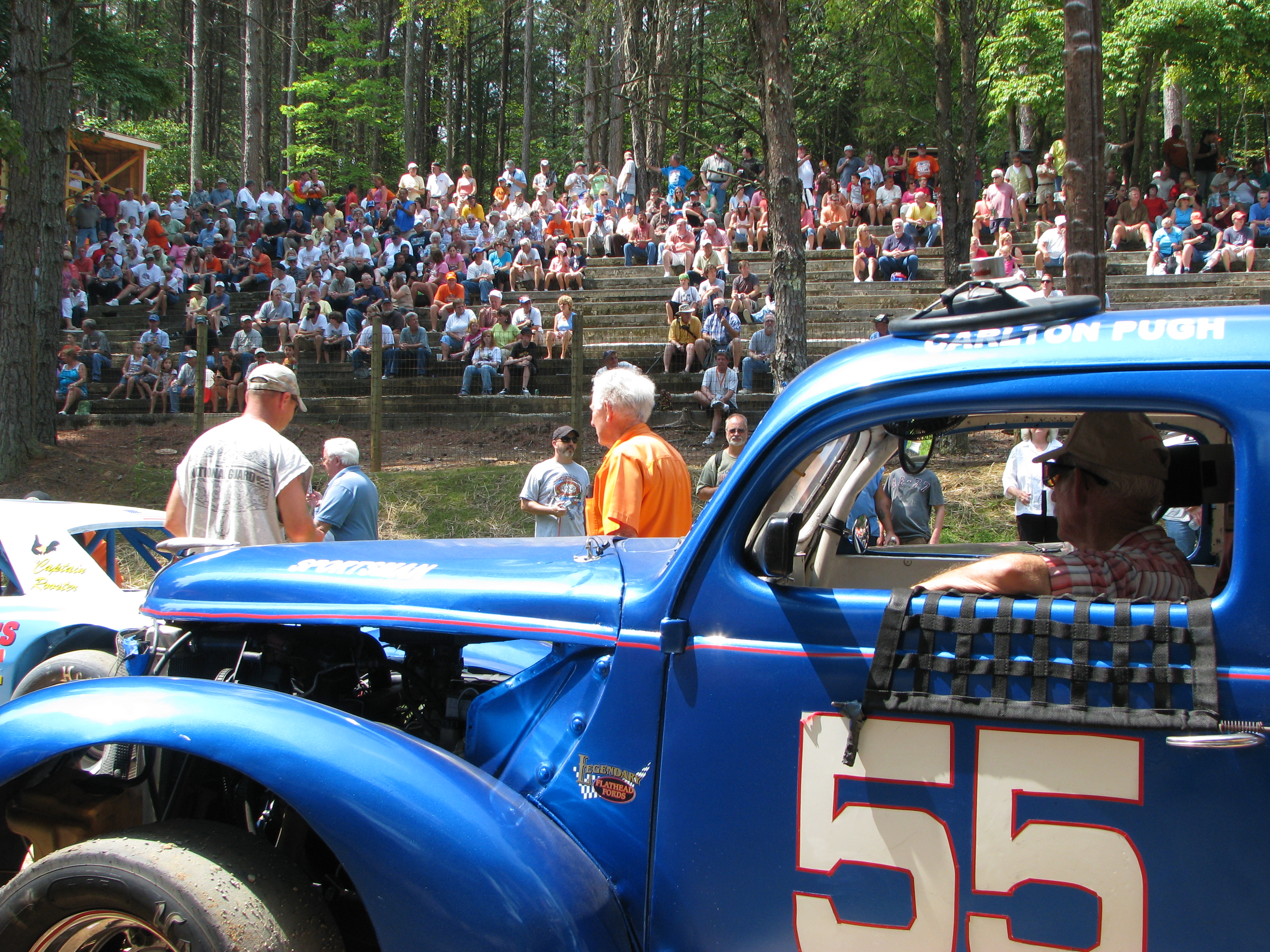
Grandstands back in use – 2010 Car Show

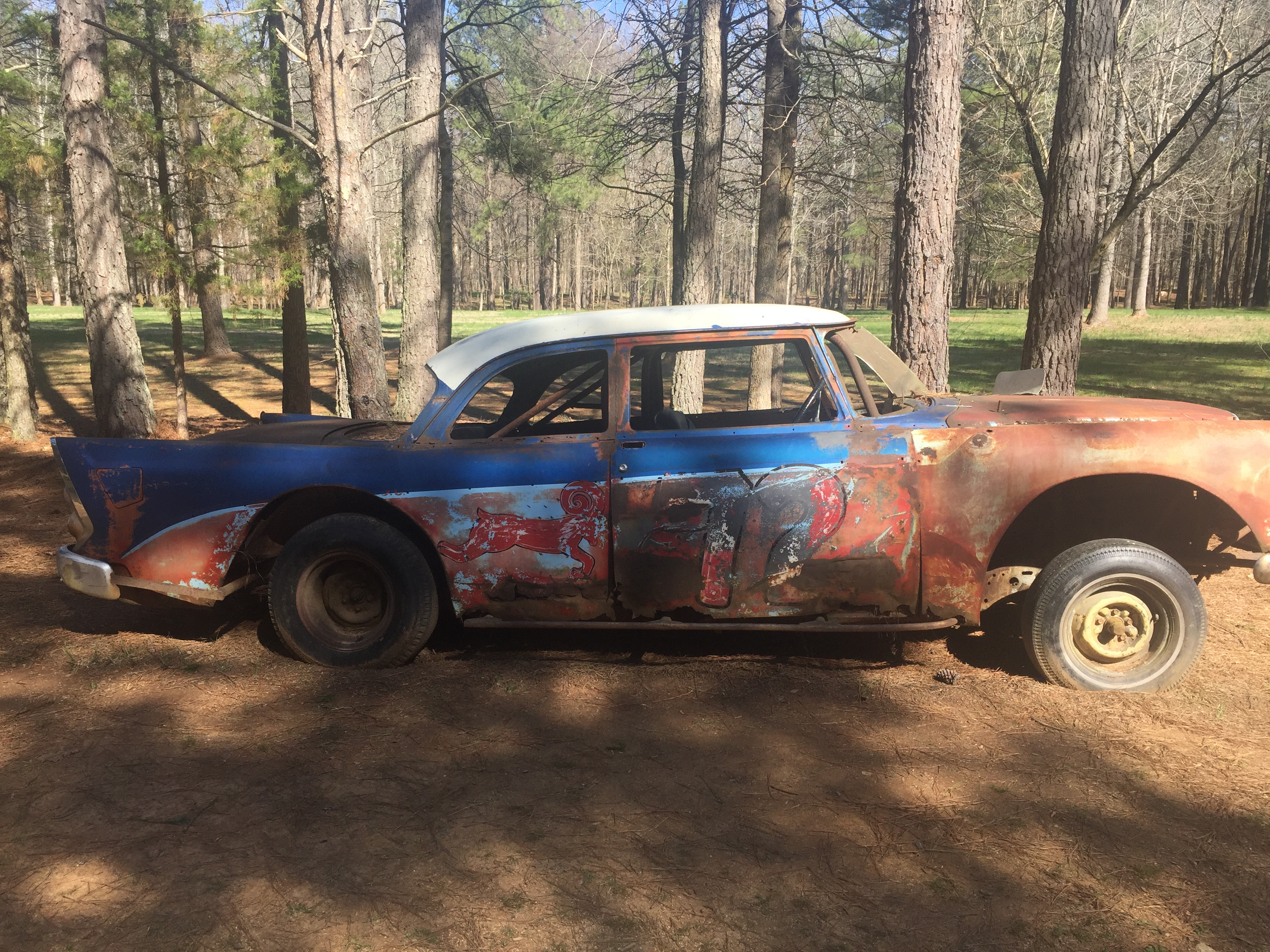
A rusted car that was modified for racing on the speedway
