= NASCAR Cup Series at North Wilkesboro Speedway =

NASCAR Cup Series races at North Wilkesboro

NASCAR Cup Series
- Venue: North Wilkesboro Speedway
- Location: North Wilkesboro, North Carolina, United States

Circuit information
- Surface: Asphalt
- Length: 0.625 mi (1.006 km)
- Turns: 4

Stock car races in the NASCAR Cup Series have been held at North Wilkesboro Speedway in North Wilkesboro, North Carolina since 1949.

== Spring race ==
First Union 400
NASCAR Winston Cup Series
- Venue: North Wilkesboro Speedway, North Wilkesboro, North Carolina
- Corporate sponsor: First Union
- First race: 1951
- Last race: 1996
- Distance: 250 miles (402.3 km)
- Laps: 400
- Previous names: Wilkes County 150 (1951); Wilkes County 200 (1952–1953); Wilkes County 160 (1954–1958); Gwyn Staley 160 (1959–1960); Gwyn Staley 400 (1961–1978); Northwestern Bank 400 (1979–1985); First Union 400 (1986–1996)

The First Union 400 was a NASCAR Winston Cup Series stock car race held annually from 1951 to 1996 at the North Wilkesboro Speedway in Wilkes County, North Carolina. It was the first of two Winston Cup Series races held annually (with the autumn's Tyson Holly Farms 400) at North Wilkesboro Speedway before the track was abandoned in 1996. The race was normally held in late March or early April.

=== Past winners ===
| Year | Date | No. | Driver | Team | Manufacturer | Race distance | | Race time | Average speed (mph) | Report | Ref |
| Year | Date | No. | Driver | Team | Manufacturer | Laps | Miles (km) | Race time | Average speed (mph) | Report | Ref |
|---|---|---|---|---|---|---|---|---|---|---|---|
| 1951 | April 29 | 14 | Fonty Flock | Frank Christian | Oldsmobile | 150 | 93.75 (150.876) | | | Report | |
| 1952 | March 30 | 92 | Herb Thomas | Herb Thomas | Hudson | 200 | 125 (201.168) | 2:08:00 | 58.597 | Report | |
| 1953 | March 29 | 92 | Herb Thomas | Herb Thomas | Hudson | 200 | 125 (201.168) | 1:44:18 | 71.907 | Report | |
| 1954 | April 4 | 3 | Dick Rathmann | John Ditz | Hudson | 160 | 100 (160.934) | 1:27:32 | 68.545 | Report | |
| 1955 | April 3 | 87 | Buck Baker | Bob Griffin | Oldsmobile | 160 | 100 (160.934) | 1:22:03 | 73.126 | Report | |
| 1956 | April 8 | 300A | Tim Flock | Carl Kiekhaefer | Chrysler | 160 | 100 (160.934) | 1:24:28 | 71.034 | Report | |
| 1957 | April 7 | 22 | Fireball Roberts | Pete DePaolo | Ford | 160 | 100 (160.934) | 1:19:59 | 75.015 | Report | |
| 1958 | May 18 | 11 | Junior Johnson | Paul Spaulding | Ford | 160 | 100 (160.934) | 1:16:18 | 78.636 | Report | |
| 1959 | April 5 | 43 | Lee Petty | Petty Enterprises | Oldsmobile | 160 | 100 (160.934) | 1:23:21 | 71.985 | Report | |
| 1960 | March 27 | 42 | Lee Petty | Petty Enterprises | Plymouth | 160 | 100 (160.934) | 1:30:26 | 66.347 | Report | |
| 1961 | April 16 | 4 | Rex White | Rex White | Chevrolet | 400 | 250 (402.336) | 3:00:11 | 83.248 | Report | |
| 1962 | April 15 | 43 | Richard Petty | Petty Enterprises | Plymouth | 400 | 250 (402.336) | 2:57:01 | 84.737 | Report | |
| 1963 | April 28 | 43 | Richard Petty | Petty Enterprises | Plymouth | 257* | 160.625 (258.5) | 1:57:06 | 83.301 | Report | |
| 1964 | April 19 | 28 | Fred Lorenzen | Holman-Moody | Ford | 400 | 250 (402.336) | 3:03:05 | 81.93 | Report | |
| 1965 | April 18 | 26 | Junior Johnson | Junior Johnson & Associates | Ford | 400 | 250 (402.336) | 2:37:49 | 95.047 | Report | |
| 1966 | April 17 | 14 | Jim Paschal | Frieden Enterprises | Plymouth | 400 | 250 (402.336) | 2:50:22 | 89.045 | Report | |
| 1967 | April 16 | 26 | Darel Dieringer | Junior Johnson & Associates | Ford | 400 | 270 (434.522) | 2:40:16 | 93.594 | Report | |
| 1968 | April 21 | 17 | David Pearson | Holman-Moody | Ford | 400 | 250 (402.336) | 2:45:33 | 90.425 | Report | |
| 1969 | April 20 | 22 | Bobby Allison | Mario Rossi | Dodge | 400 | 250 (402.336) | 2:37:27 | 95.268 | Report | |
| 1970 | April 18 | 43 | Richard Petty | Petty Enterprises | Plymouth | 400 | 250 (402.336) | 2:38:41 | 94.246 | Report | |
| 1971 | April 18 | 43 | Richard Petty | Petty Enterprises | Plymouth | 400 | 250 (402.336) | 2:32:19 | 98.479 | Report | |
| 1972 | April 23 | 43 | Richard Petty | Petty Enterprises | Plymouth | 400 | 250 (402.336) | 2:53:19 | 86.381 | Report | |
| 1973 | April 8 | 43 | Richard Petty | Petty Enterprises | Dodge | 400 | 250 (402.336) | 2:34:17 | 97.224 | Report | |
| 1974 | April 21 | 43 | Richard Petty | Petty Enterprises | Dodge | 360* | 225 (362.102) | 2:20:20 | 96.2 | Report | |
| 1975 | April 6 | 43 | Richard Petty | Petty Enterprises | Dodge | 400 | 250 (402.336) | 2:46:39 | 90.009 | Report | |
| 1976 | April 4 | 11 | Cale Yarborough | Junior Johnson & Associates | Chevrolet | 400 | 250 (402.336) | 2:34:52 | 96.858 | Report | |
| 1977 | March 27 | 11 | Cale Yarborough | Junior Johnson & Associates | Chevrolet | 400 | 250 (402.336) | 2:48:38 | 88.95 | Report | |
| 1978 | April 16 | 88 | Darrell Waltrip | DiGard Motorsports | Chevrolet | 400 | 250 (402.336) | 2:42:26 | 92.345 | Report | |
| 1979 | March 25 | 15 | Bobby Allison | Bud Moore Engineering | Ford | 400 | 250 (402.336) | 2:49:41 | 88.4 | Report | |
| 1980 | April 20 | 43 | Richard Petty | Petty Enterprises | Chevrolet | 400 | 250 (402.336) | 2:37:04 | 95.501 | Report | |
| 1981 | April 5 | 43 | Richard Petty | Petty Enterprises | Buick | 400 | 250 (402.336) | 2:55:41 | 85.381 | Report | |
| 1982 | April 18 | 11 | Darrell Waltrip | Junior Johnson & Associates | Buick | 400 | 250 (402.336) | 2:33:37 | 97.646 | Report | |
| 1983 | April 17 | 11 | Darrell Waltrip | Junior Johnson & Associates | Chevrolet | 400 | 250 (402.336) | 2:44:03 | 91.436 | Report | |
| 1984 | April 8 | 27 | Tim Richmond | Blue Max Racing | Pontiac | 400 | 250 (402.336) | 2:33:19 | 97.83 | Report | |
| 1985 | April 21 | 12 | Neil Bonnett | Junior Johnson & Associates | Chevrolet | 400 | 250 (402.336) | 2:39:53 | 93.818 | Report | |
| 1986 | April 20 | 3 | Dale Earnhardt | Richard Childress Racing | Chevrolet | 400 | 250 (402.336) | 2:49:40 | 88.408 | Report | |
| 1987 | April 5 | 3 | Dale Earnhardt | Richard Childress Racing | Chevrolet | 400 | 250 (402.336) | 2:39:24 | 94.103 | Report | |
| 1988 | April 17 | 11 | Terry Labonte | Junior Johnson & Associates | Chevrolet | 400 | 250 (402.336) | 2:31:24 | 99.075 | Report | |
| 1989 | April 16 | 3 | Dale Earnhardt | Richard Childress Racing | Chevrolet | 400 | 250 (402.336) | 2:46:47 | 89.937 | Report | |
| 1990 | April 22 | 26 | Brett Bodine | King Racing | Buick | 400 | 250 (402.336) | 2:58:46 | 83.908 | Report | |
| 1991 | April 21 | 17 | Darrell Waltrip | DarWal, Inc. | Chevrolet | 400 | 250 (402.336) | 3:08:26 | 79.604 | Report | |
| 1992 | April 12 | 28 | Davey Allison | Robert Yates Racing | Ford | 400 | 250 (402.336) | 2:45:28 | 90.653 | Report | |
| 1993 | April 18 | 2 | Rusty Wallace | Penske Racing | Pontiac | 400 | 250 (402.336) | 2:41:59 | 92.602 | Report | |
| 1994 | April 17 | 5 | Terry Labonte | Hendrick Motorsports | Chevrolet | 400 | 250 (402.336) | 2:36:33 | 95.816 | Report | |
| 1995 | April 9 | 3 | Dale Earnhardt | Richard Childress Racing | Chevrolet | 400 | 250 (402.336) | 2:26:27 | 102.424 | Report | |
| 1996 | April 14 | 5 | Terry Labonte | Hendrick Motorsports | Chevrolet | 400 | 250 (402.336) | 2:35:39 | 96.37 | Report | |

- 1963: Race shortened due to rain.
- 1974: Race shortened due to energy crisis.
- 1977: Yarborough won on his birthday, the first driver to do so.
- 1990: Bodine's lone Winston Cup victory and last win for Buick; finish disputed due to a scoring error.

==== Multiple winners (drivers) ====
| # Wins | Driver | Years won |
|---|---|---|
| 10 | Richard Petty | 1962, 1963, 1970, 1971, 1972, 1973, 1974, 1975, 1980, 1981 |
| 4 | Darrell Waltrip | 1978, 1982, 1983, 1991 |
| 4 | Dale Earnhardt | 1986, 1987, 1989, 1995 |
| 3 | Terry Labonte | 1988, 1994, 1996 |
| 2 | Herb Thomas | 1952, 1953 |
| 2 | Lee Petty | 1959, 1960 |
| 2 | Junior Johnson | 1958, 1965 |
| 2 | Cale Yarborough | 1976, 1977 |
| 2 | Bobby Allison | 1969, 1979 |

==== Manufacturer wins ====
| # Wins | Manufacturer | Years won |
|---|---|---|
| 15 | Chevrolet | 1961, 1976, 1977, 1978, 1980, 1983, 1985, 1986, 1987, 1988, 1989, 1991, 1994, 1995, 1996 |
| 8 | Ford | 1957, 1958, 1964, 1965, 1967, 1968, 1979, 1992 |
| 7 | Plymouth | 1960, 1962, 1963, 1966, 1970, 1971, 1972 |
| 4 | Dodge | 1969, 1973, 1974, 1975 |
| 3 | Hudson | 1952, 1953, 1954 |
| 3 | Oldsmobile | 1951, 1955, 1959 |
| 3 | Buick | 1981, 1982, 1990 |
| 2 | Pontiac | 1984, 1993 |

== Fall race ==
Window World 450
- First race: 1949
- Last race: 2026
- Distance: 281.25 miles (452.63 km)
- Laps: 450; Stage 1: 80; Stages 2/3: 185
- Previous names: Wilkes 200 (1949–1952, 1961); Wilkes 160 (1953–1955, 1957–1959); Wilkes 320 (1960, 1962); Wilkes 400 (1963–1978); Holly Farms 400 (1979–1989); Tyson Holly Farms 400 (1990–1996)

The Window World 450 was the second of two Winston Cup Series races held annually at North Wilkesboro Speedway before the track was abandoned in 1996.

In 2023, during NASCAR's 75th anniversary season, the NASCAR All-Star Race moved to North Wilkesboro Speedway. In 2026, the All-Star Race was moved to Dover Motor Speedway, giving North Wilkesboro a points-paying race. In 2027, the NASCAR All-Star Race moved back to North Wilkesboro Speedway.

When the race returned to the schedule, it was originally scheduled as a 400 lap event, being dubbed the "Window World 400". However, on December 4, 2025, North Wilkesboro track officials announced the race would be extended by 50 laps, being dubbed the "Window World 450".

=== Past winners ===
| Year | Date | No. | Driver | Team | Manufacturer | Race distance | | Race time | Average speed (mph) | Report | Ref |
| Year | Date | No. | Driver | Team | Manufacturer | Laps | Miles (km) | Race time | Average speed (mph) | Report | Ref |
|---|---|---|---|---|---|---|---|---|---|---|---|
| 1949 | Oct 16 | 7 | Bob Flock | Frank Christian | Oldsmobile | 200 | 100 (160.934) | 1:52:26 | 53.364 | Report | |
| 1950 | Sept 24 | 98 | Leon Sales | Hubert Westmoreland | Plymouth | 200 | 125 (201.168) | | | Report | |
| 1951 | Oct 21 | 7 | Fonty Flock | Ted Chester | Oldsmobile | 200 | 125 (201.168) | 1:50:38 | 67.791 | Report | |
| 1952 | Oct 26 | 9 | Herb Thomas | Herb Thomas | Hudson | 200 | 125 (201.168) | 1:51:52 | 67.044 | Report | |
| 1953 | Oct 11 | 46 | Speedy Thompson | Buckshot Morris | Oldsmobile | 160 | 100 (160.934) | 1:24:16 | 71.202 | Report | |
| 1954 | Oct 24 | 14 | Hershel McGriff | Frank Christian | Oldsmobile | 157* | 98.125 (157.916) | 1:30:20 | 65.175 | Report | |
| 1955 | Oct 23 | 87 | Buck Baker | Pete DePaolo | Ford | 160 | 100 (160.934) | 1:21:16 | 72.347 | Report | |
| 1956 | Not held | | | | | | | | | | |
| 1957 | Oct 20 | 47 | Jack Smith | Jack Smith | Chevrolet | 160 | 100 (160.934) | 1:29:10 | 69.902 | Report | |
| 1958 | Oct 19 | 11 | Junior Johnson | Paul Spaulding | Ford | 160 | 100 (160.934) | 1:10:40 | 84.906 | Report | |
| 1959 | Oct 18 | 42 | Lee Petty | Petty Enterprises | Oldsmobile | 160 | 100 (160.934) | 1:20:11 | 74.829 | Report | |
| 1960 | Oct 2 | 4 | Rex White | Rex White | Chevrolet | 320 | 200 (321.868) | 2:34:57 | 77.444 | Report | |
| 1961 | Oct 1 | 4 | Rex White | Rex White | Chevrolet | 320 | 200 (321.868) | 2:21:43 | 84.675 | Report | |
| 1962 | Sept 30 | 43 | Richard Petty | Petty Enterprises | Plymouth | 320 | 200 (321.868) | 2:19:14 | 86.186 | Report | |
| 1963 | Sept 29 | 21 | Marvin Panch | Wood Brothers Racing | Ford | 400 | 250 (402.336) | 2:47:44 | 89.428 | Report | |
| 1964 | Oct 11 | 21 | Marvin Panch | Wood Brothers Racing | Ford | 400 | 250 (402.336) | 2:44:07 | 91.398 | Report | |
| 1965 | Oct 3 | 26 | Junior Johnson | Junior Johnson & Associates | Ford | 400 | 250 (402.336) | 2:48:55 | 88.801 | Report | |
| 1966 | Oct 2 | 29 | Dick Hutcherson | Holman-Moody | Ford | 400 | 250 (402.336) | 2:48:31 | 89.012 | Report | |
| 1967 | Oct 1 | 43 | Richard Petty | Petty Enterprises | Plymouth | 400 | 250 (402.336) | 2:38:10 | 94.837 | Report | |
| 1968 | Sept 29 | 43 | Richard Petty | Petty Enterprises | Plymouth | 400 | 250 (402.336) | 2:39:24 | 94.103 | Report | |
| 1969 | Oct 5 | 17 | David Pearson | Holman-Moody | Ford | 400 | 250 (402.336) | 2:40:32 | 93.429 | Report | |
| 1970 | Oct 4 | 71 | Bobby Isaac | Nord Krauskopf | Dodge | 400 | 250 (402.336) | 2:46:20 | 90.162 | Report | |
| 1971 | Nov 21 | 55 | Tiny Lund | Ronnie Hopkins | Camaro | 400 | 250 (402.336) | 2:35:58 | 96.174 | Report | |
| 1972 | Oct 1 | 43 | Richard Petty | Petty Enterprises | Plymouth | 400 | 250 (402.336) | 2:36:33 | 95.816 | Report | |
| 1973 | Sept 23 | 12 | Bobby Allison | Bobby Allison | Chevrolet | 400 | 250 (402.336) | 2:37:34 | 95.198 | Report | |
| 1974 | Sept 22 | 11 | Cale Yarborough | Junior Johnson & Associates | Chevrolet | 400 | 250 (402.336) | 3:05:41 | 80.782 | Report | |
| 1975 | Sept 21 | 43 | Richard Petty | Petty Enterprises | Dodge | 400 | 250 (402.336) | 2:48:34 | 88.986 | Report | |
| 1976 | Oct 3 | 11 | Cale Yarborough | Junior Johnson & Associates | Chevrolet | 400 | 250 (402.336) | 2:35:38 | 96.38 | Report | |
| 1977 | Oct 2 | 88 | Darrell Waltrip | DiGard Motorsports | Chevrolet | 400 | 250 (402.336) | 2:52:59 | 86.713 | Report | |
| 1978 | Oct 1 | 11 | Cale Yarborough | Junior Johnson & Associates | Oldsmobile | 400 | 250 (402.336) | 2:43:18 | 97.847 | Report | |
| 1979 | Oct 14 | 27 | Benny Parsons | M.C. Anderson Racing | Chevrolet | 400 | 250 (402.336) | 2:44:01 | 91.454 | Report | |
| 1980 | Sept 21 | 15 | Bobby Allison | Bud Moore Engineering | Ford | 400 | 250 (402.336) | 3:18:39 | 75.51 | Report | |
| 1981 | Oct 4 | 11 | Darrell Waltrip | Junior Johnson & Associates | Buick | 400 | 250 (402.336) | 2:41:08 | 93.091 | Report | |
| 1982 | Oct 3 | 11 | Darrell Waltrip | Junior Johnson & Associates | Buick | 400 | 250 (402.336) | 2:32:57 | 98.071 | Report | |
| 1983 | Oct 2 | 11 | Darrell Waltrip | Junior Johnson & Associates | Chevrolet | 400 | 250 (402.336) | 2:28:56 | 100.716 | Report | |
| 1984 | Oct 14 | 11 | Darrell Waltrip | Junior Johnson & Associates | Chevrolet | 400 | 250 (402.336) | 2:45:42 | 90.525 | Report | |
| 1985 | Sept 29 | 33 | Harry Gant | Mach 1 Racing | Chevrolet | 400 | 250 (402.336) | 2:37:44 | 95.077 | Report | |
| 1986 | Sept 28 | 11 | Darrell Waltrip | Junior Johnson & Associates | Chevrolet | 400 | 250 (402.336) | 2:36:53 | 95.612 | Report | |
| 1987 | Oct 4 | 11 | Terry Labonte | Junior Johnson & Associates | Chevrolet | 400 | 250 (402.336) | 2:36:09 | 96.051 | Report | |
| 1988 | Oct 16* | 27 | Rusty Wallace | Blue Max Racing | Pontiac | 400 | 250 (402.336) | 2:39:15 | 94.192 | Report | |
| 1989 | Oct 15* | 5 | Geoff Bodine | Hendrick Motorsports | Chevrolet | 400 | 250 (402.336) | 2:46:08 | 90.269 | Report | |
| 1990 | Sept 30 | 6 | Mark Martin | Roush Racing | Ford | 400 | 250 (402.336) | 2:39:53 | 93.818 | Report | |
| 1991 | Sept 29 | 3 | Dale Earnhardt | Richard Childress Racing | Chevrolet | 400 | 250 (402.336) | 2:39:23 | 94.113 | Report | |
| 1992 | Oct 5 | 15 | Geoff Bodine | Bud Moore Engineering | Ford | 400 | 250 (402.336) | 2:19:43 | 107.36 | Report | |
| 1993 | Oct 3 | 2 | Rusty Wallace | Penske Racing | Pontiac | 400 | 250 (402.336) | 2:34:46 | 96.92 | Report | |
| 1994 | Oct 2 | 7 | Geoff Bodine | Geoff Bodine Racing | Ford | 400 | 250 (402.336) | 2:32:15 | 98.522 | Report | |
| 1995 | Oct 1 | 6 | Mark Martin | Roush Racing | Ford | 400 | 250 (402.336) | 2:25:38 | 102.998 | Report | |
| 1996 | Sept 29 | 24 | Jeff Gordon | Hendrick Motorsports | Chevrolet | 400 | 250 (402.336) | 2:34:54 | 96.837 | Report | |
| 1997 – 2025 | Not held | | | | | | | | | | |
| 2026 | July 19 | 22 | Joey Logano | Team Penske | Ford | 450 | 281.25 (452.63) | 2:50:57 | 88.397 | Report | |

- 1954: Race shortened due to crash.
- 1988: The race was originally scheduled for October 2, but two consecutive days of rain caused it to be rescheduled for October 16.
- 1989: The race was originally scheduled for October 1, but persistent rain caused it to be rescheduled for October 15.

==== Multiple winners (drivers) ====
| # Wins | Driver | Years won |
|---|---|---|
| 6 | Darrell Waltrip | 1977, 1981, 1982, 1983, 1984, 1986 |
| 5 | Richard Petty | 1962, 1967, 1968, 1972, 1975 |
| 3 | Cale Yarborough | 1974, 1976, 1978 |
| 3 | Geoff Bodine | 1989, 1992, 1994 |
| 2 | Rex White | 1960, 1961 |
| 2 | Marvin Panch | 1963, 1964 |
| 2 | Junior Johnson | 1958, 1965 |
| 2 | Bobby Allison | 1973, 1980 |
| 2 | Rusty Wallace | 1988, 1993 |
| 2 | Mark Martin | 1990, 1995 |

==== Multiple winners (teams) ====
| # Wins | Team | Years won |
|---|---|---|
| 10 | Junior Johnson & Associates | 1965, 1974, 1976, 1978, 1981, 1982, 1983, 1984, 1986, 1987 |
| 6 | Petty Enterprises | 1959, 1962, 1967, 1968, 1972, 1975 |
| 2 | Frank Christian | 1949, 1954 |
| 2 | Rex White | 1960, 1961 |
| 2 | Wood Brothers Racing | 1963, 1964 |
| 2 | Holman-Moody | 1966, 1969 |
| 2 | Bud Moore Engineering | 1980, 1992 |
| 2 | Roush Racing | 1990, 1995 |
| 2 | Hendrick Motorsports | 1989, 1996 |
| 2 | Team Penske | 1993, 2026 |

==== Manufacturer wins ====
| # Wins | Manufacturer | Years won |
|---|---|---|
| 16 | Chevrolet | 1957, 1960, 1961, 1973, 1974, 1976, 1977, 1979, 1983, 1984, 1985, 1986, 1987, 1989, 1991, 1996 |
| 13 | Ford | 1955, 1958, 1963, 1964, 1965, 1966, 1969, 1980, 1990, 1992, 1994, 1995, 2026 |
| 6 | Oldsmobile | 1949, 1951, 1953, 1954, 1959, 1978 |
| 5 | Plymouth | 1950, 1962, 1967, 1968, 1972 |
| 2 | Dodge | 1970, 1975 |
| 2 | Buick | 1981, 1982 |
| 2 | Pontiac | 1988, 1993 |

| Previous race: Quaker State 400 | NASCAR Cup Series; Window World 450 | Next race: Brickyard 400 |
