= Joe Weatherly =

American racing driver and motorcycle racer (1922–1964)

- Weatherly in a 1963 advertisement
- Born: Joseph Herbert Weatherly; May 29, 1922; Norfolk, Virginia, U.S.
- Died: January 19, 1964 (aged 41); Riverside, California, U.S.
- Cause of death: Racing crash at Riverside International Raceway
- Achievements: 1962 Grand National Series Champion; 1963 Grand National Series Champion; 1952 Modified National Champion; 1953 Modified National Champion; Three American Motorcycle Association championships; Led Grand National Series in wins in 1961 and 1962
- Awards: 1961 Grand National Series Most Popular Driver; Named one of NASCAR's 50 Greatest Drivers (1998); International Motorsports Hall of Fame (1994); Motorcycle Hall of Fame (1998); Named one of NASCAR's 75 Greatest Drivers (2023); Motorsports Hall of Fame of America (2009); NASCAR Hall of Fame (2015)

NASCAR Cup Series career
- 230 races run over 12 years
- Best finish: 1st (1962, 1963)
- First race: 1952 Southern 500 (Darlington)
- Last race: 1964 Motor Trend 500 (Riverside)
- First win: 1958 Nashville 200 (Nashville)
- Last win: 1963 Untitled race (Hillsboro)
Wins	Top tens	Poles
25	153	18

NASCAR Convertible Division career
- 96 races run over 4 years
- Best finish: 2nd (1957)
- First race: 1956 Race #1 (Daytona Beach & Road Course)
- Last race: 1959 Race #15 (Charlotte Fairgrounds)
- First win: 1956 Race #26 (Buffalo)
- Last win: 1959 Race #7 (Occoneechee)
Wins	Top tens	Poles
12	74	19
- Statistics up to date as of April 15, 2013.

Joseph Herbert Weatherly (May 29, 1922 – January 19, 1964) was an American stock car racing driver. Weatherly was inducted into the Motorsports Hall of Fame of America in 2009 after winning NASCAR's Grand National Series championships in 1962 and 1963, three AMA Grand National Championships, and two NASCAR Modified championships.

== Personality ==
Weatherly enjoyed behaving outrageously. He once took practice laps wearing a Peter Pan suit. Moreover, he frequently stayed out partying until the early hours, usually with fellow driver and friend Curtis Turner. This behavior earned him the nickname the "Clown Prince of Racing". In 1956 at Raleigh, while racing in the convertible series, Weatherly's engine blew. With the help of Ralph Liguori pushing from behind, he displayed showmanship to the fullest extent by crossing the finish line while standing in a "chariot of fire".

== Motorcycle career ==
Weatherly won three American Motorcycle Association (AMA) nationals between 1946 and 1950, including the prestigious Laconia Classic 100 Mile road race in 1948. In 1998 he was inducted into the AMA Motorcycle Hall of Fame.

== NASCAR career ==
Weatherly began racing cars in 1950. "Little Joe" won the first modified event that he entered. He won 49 of the 83 car races that he entered that season. In 1952, he won the NASCAR Modified National crown, and he again won 49 of 83 car races that he entered. Weatherly won 52 more races in 1953 and won the Modified National crown again.

Weatherly had a partial interest in what would later be called Richmond International Raceway from 1955 to 1956.

In 1956, Weatherly moved into the NASCAR Grand National series. He drove a factory-sponsored Ford car for Pete DePaolo Engineering. For the next two seasons, he drove for Holman Moody.

In 1959, Weatherly recorded six top-five finishes and ten top-tens. He narrowly lost the 1959 Hickory 250 to Junior Johnson; being out lapped twice before the race was concluded.

Weatherly won NASCAR's Most Popular Driver Award in 1961.

Weatherly won two consecutive championships, in 1962 and 1963, for Bud Moore Engineering. Moore did not have enough resources to run the full season, so Weatherly frequently "bummed a ride".

== Death ==
Weatherly died on January 19, 1964, from head injuries sustained in a racing accident at the fifth race of the 1964 season, at Riverside International Raceway. His head went outside the car and struck a retaining wall, killing him instantly. Weatherly was not wearing a shoulder harness and did not have a window net installed on his vehicle, because he was afraid of being trapped in a burning car.

Weatherly was the first driver to die during the season after winning the Cup Series championship; since his death, this has occurred just one other time, as 1992 series champion Alan Kulwicki lost his life early in the 1993 season. Unlike Weatherly, who died in a racing accident, Kulwicki was killed in a plane crash.

Weatherly's fatal crash, combined with Richard Petty's crash at Darlington in 1970, eventually led NASCAR to mandate the window net seven years later, in 1971.

Weatherly's grave marker is a sculpture of Riverside Raceway, with a checkered flag marking the spot of his fatal crash.

== Awards ==
Weatherly was inducted into the Motorcycle Hall of Fame in 1998.

Weatherly was named one of NASCAR's 50 Greatest Drivers in 1998.

Weatherly was inducted into the Motorsports Hall of Fame of America in 2009.

Weatherly was inducted into the NASCAR Hall of Fame on January 30, 2015.

Weatherly was named one of NASCAR's 75 Greatest Drivers in 2023.

== Motorsports career results ==
=== NASCAR ===
(key) (Bold – Pole position awarded by qualifying time. Italics – Pole position earned by points standings or practice time. * – Most laps led. ** – All laps led.)

==== Grand National Series ====
NASCAR Grand National Series results
Year	Team	No.	Make	1	2	3	4	5	6	7	8	9	10	11	12	13	14	15	16	17	18	19	20	21	22	23	24	25	26	27	28	29	30	31	32	33	34	35	36	37	38	39	40	41	42	43	44	45	46	47	48	49	50	51	52	53	54	55	56	57	58	59	60	61	62	NGNC	Pts	Ref
1951	Jack Tyler	29	Olds	DAB	CLT	NMO	GAR	HBO	ASF	NWS	MAR	CAN	CLS	CLB	DSP	GAR	GRS	BAI	HEI	AWS	MCF	ALS	MSF	FMS	MOR	ABS	DAR; Wth	CLB	CCS	LAN	CLT	DSP	WIL	HBO	TPN	PGS	MAR	OAK	NWS	HMS	JSP	ATL	GAR	NMO																						NA	-	
1952	Donlavey Racing	53	Hudson	PBS	DAB	JSP	NWS	MAR	CLB	ATL	CCS	LAN	DAR	DSP	CAN	HAY	FMS	HBO	CLT	MSF	NIF	OSW	MON	MOR	PPS	MCF	AWS	DAR; 16	CCS	LAN	DSP	WIL	HBO	MAR	NWS	ATL	PBS																													51st	500	
1954	Buckshot Morris	12	Olds	PBS	DAB	JSP	ATL	OSP	OAK	NWS	HBO	CCS	LAN	WIL; 7	MAR	SHA	RSP	CLT	GAR	CLB	LND	HCY	MCF	WGS	PIF	AWS	SFS	GRS	MOR	OAK	CLT	SAN	COR	DAR	CCS	CLT	LAN	MAS	MAR	NWS																										102nd	152	
1955	Schwam Motors	9	Ford	TCS	PBS	JSP	DAB	OSP	CLB	HBO	NWS	MGY	LAN	CLT	HCY	ASF	TUS	MAR	RCH	NCF	FOR	LIN	MCF	FON	AIR	CLT	PIF	CLB	AWS	MOR	ALS	NYF	SAN	CLT	FOR	MAS	RSP	DAR; 33*	MGY	LAN	RSP	GPS		CLB; 8	MAR; 6	LVP	NWS; 4	HBO; 6																		47th	724	
1955	DePaolo Engineering	86	Ford																																								MAS; 32																							47th	724	
1956	Schwam Motors	9	Ford	HCY; 28	CLT; 4	WSS	PBS; 22		DAB; 44	PBS; 4	WIL	ATL	NWS	LAN	RCH	CLB; 3	CON	GPS; 5	HCY	HBO; 7	MAR	LIN	CLT; 6	POR	EUR	NYF	MER	MAS	CLT; 15	MCF	POR	AWS	RSP	PIF	CSF	CHI	CCF	MGY	OKL	ROA; 20	OBS	SAN					DAR; 8	CSH	CLT	LAN	POR	CLB	HBO													16th	3084	
1956	Schwam Motors	11	Ford					**ASF**; 7*																																																										16th	3084	
1956	Fred Frazier	35	Ford																																								NOR; 9	PIF	MYB	POR																				16th	3084	
1956	John Whitford	31	Ford																																																			NWP; 4	CLT	CCF										16th	3084	
1956	DePaolo Engineering	72	Ford																																																						MAR; 6	HCY								16th	3084	
1956	DePaolo Engineering	112	Ford																																																								WIL; 2							16th	3084	
1957	DePaolo Engineering	J12	Ford	WSS	CON; 8	TIC; 15																																																												42nd	920	
1957	DePaolo Engineering	9	Ford				DAB; 18																																																											42nd	920	
1957	DePaolo Engineering	97	Ford					CON; 17	WIL	HBO	AWS	NWS	LAN	CLT	PIF	GBF	POR	CCF	RCH	MAR	POR	EUR	LIN	LCS	ASP	NWP	CLB	CPS	PIF	JAC																																				42nd	920	
1957	Holman-Moody	12	Ford																												RSP; 3	CLT	MAS; 26	POR	HCY; 3	NOR; 2	LCS	GLN	KPC	LIN	OBS	MYB						LAN; 7	CLB			MAR; 5	NBR	CON	NWS	GBF; 3										42nd	920	
1957	Holman-Moody	9	Ford																																								DAR; 40	NYF	AWS	CSF	SCF																			42nd	920	
1957	Holman-Moody	2	Ford																																															CCF; 12																42nd	920	
1957	Holman-Moody	2X	Ford																																																CLT; 26															42nd	920	
1958	Holman-Moody	12	Ford	FAY	DAB; 4	CON	FAY; 17	WIL	HBO	FAY	CLB	PIF	**ATL**; 2	CLT; 5	MAR; 31	ODS	OBS	GPS	GBF				TRN; 8	RSD	CLB	NBS	REF	LIN	HCY	AWS														DAR; 29	CLT	BIR	CSF	GAF																		28th	2032	
1958	Dick Beaty	34	Ford																	STR; 12	NWS	BGS																																												28th	2032	
1958	Holman-Moody	198	Ford																												RSP; 27	MCC	SLS	TOR	BUF	MCF	BEL	BRR	CLB																											28th	2032	
1958	Holman-Moody	72	Ford																																					NSV; 1									RCH; 19	HBO	SAS															28th	2032	
1958	Petty Enterprises	2	Olds																																						AWS; 8	BGS																								28th	2032	
1958	Julian Petty	44	Chevy																																								MBS; 21																							28th	2032	
1958	Holman-Moody	1	Ford																																																	MAR; 35	NWS													28th	2032	
1958	Beau Morgan	45	Ford																																																			ATL; 4												28th	2032	
1959	E. C. Wilson	48	Chevy	FAY	DAY; 4	DAY; 5	HBO	CON	ATL																																																									18th	3404	
1959	Julian Petty	40	Chevy							WIL; 9	BGS	CLB	NWS	REF																																																				18th	3404	
1959	Doc White	41	Ford												HCY; 2	MAR; 8	TRN	CLT; 16	NSV	ASP	PIF	GPS	ATL; 15	CLB; 5	WIL; 23	RCH; 16	BGS	AWS			CLT; 26	MBS; 5	CLT	NSV; 7	AWS; 40																															18th	3404	
1959	Doc White	12	Ford																										DAY; 2	HEI									DAR; 43	HCY	RCH	CSF	HBO	MAR	AWS	NWS	CON																			18th	3404	
1959	Wood Brothers Racing	21	Ford																																	BGS; 7	GPS	CLB																												18th	3404	
1960	Holman-Moody	12	Ford	CLT	CLB	DAY; 4	DAY	DAY; 41	CLT					HCY; 1*	WIL; 1	BGS	GPS; 15	AWS	DAR; 1*	PIF	HBO; 19			CLT; 43		DAY; 26	HEI	MAB	MBS	ATL; 35*	BIR	NSV	AWS	PIF				DAR; 21	HCY	CSF	GSP	HBO	MAR; 2		CLT; 45		ATL; 8																			20th	6380	
1960	Holman-Moody	31	Ford							NWS; 10	PHO	CLB; 18	MAR; 16																																																					20th	6380	
1960	Fred Wheat	12	Plymouth																			RCH; 15			BGS; 6												BGS; 7																													20th	6380	
1960	Vel Miletich	97	Ford																				HMS; 2																																											20th	6380	
1960	Doc White	61	Ford																																CLB; 25	SBO																														20th	6380	
1960	Wood Brothers Racing	16	Ford																																									NWS; 4		RCH; 16																				20th	6380	
1961	Doc White	16	Ford	CLT; 1	JSP	DAY																																																												4th	17894	
1961	Bud Moore Engineering	8	Pontiac				**DAY**; 1	DAY; 2	PIF	AWS	HMS	ATL; 22	GPS	HBO	BGS	MAR	NWS	CLB	HCY	RCH	MAR	DAR; 15	CLT	CLT; 1	RSD	ASP	CLT; 10	**PIF**; 14	BIR	GPS; 4	BGS	NOR	HAS	STR	DAY; 6	ATL; 28	CLB; 5	**MBS**; 1*	BRI; 6	NSV	BGS	AWS; 2	RCH	SBO	DAR; 22		RCH; 1	CSF	ATL; 16	MAR; 1	NWS; 8	CLT; 1	BRI; 1	GPS; 2	**HBO**; 1*											4th	17894	
1961	Elmo Henderson	7	Pontiac																																											HCY; 15																				4th	17894	
1962	Bud Moore Engineering	8	Pontiac	**CON**; 2	**AWS**; 3	DAY	DAY; 1*	DAY; 3	**CON**; 1**	AWS; 1	SVH; 3	HBO; 11*	RCH; 4	**CLB**; 2	NWS; 8	GPS; 3	MBS; 13	MAR; 2	BGS; 3	BRI; 11		HCY; 3	CON; 1	DAR; 18	PIF; 5	CLT; 2	ATL; 18	BGS; 5	**AUG**; 1	RCH; 7	SBO; 7	DAY; 23	CLB; 2	ASH; 2	GPS; 19	AUG; 1	SVH; 1	MBS; 2	BRI; 6	CHT; 1	NSV; 4	HUN; 7	AWS; 2	STR; 2	BGS; 3	PIF; 2	VAL; 3	DAR; 10	HCY; 5	RCH; 1	DTS; 2	**AUG**; 3	MAR; 5	NWS; 3	CLT; 5	ATL; 2										1st	30836	
1962	Fred Harb	17	Ford																		RCH; 4																																													1st	30836	
1963	Bud Moore Engineering	8	Pontiac	BIR; 8	GGS; 3	THS; 2	RSD; 24	DAY	DAY; 13	DAY; 8			**HBO**; 15	ATL; 4		BRI; 10		RCH; 1				MAR; 6	NWS; 23			DAR; 1			CLT; 4		ATL; 5	DAY; 18						**OBS**; 7*	BRR; 13	BRI; 6		NSV; 3	CLB; 11		**PIF**; 17		ONA; 2									SBO; 3	HBO; 1*									1st	33398	
1963	Floyd Powell	17	Pontiac								PIF; 4	AWS; 4																																																						1st	33398	
1963	Pete Stewart	57	Pontiac												HCY; 57																																																			1st	33398	
1963	Major Melton	88	Chrysler														AUG; 11																																																	1st	33398	
1963	Cliff Stewart Racing	2	Pontiac																GPS; 24		BGS; 10			CLB; 19	THS; 2		ODS; 9	RCH		BIR; 15			MBS; 3	SVH; 14	DTS; 13	BGS; 7																														1st	33398	
1963	Worth McMillion	83	Pontiac																	SBO; 16																																														1st	33398	
1963	Petty Enterprises	41	Plymouth																																		ASH; 4																													1st	33398	
1963	Possum Jones	05	Pontiac																																						GPS; 8																									1st	33398	
1963	Wade Younts	36	Dodge																																									AWS; 8																						1st	33398	
1963	Wade Younts	361	Dodge																																											BGS; 9																				1st	33398	
1963	Bud Moore Engineering	8	Mercury																																													DAR; 7	HCY; 21	**RCH**; 21*	MAR; 3	**DTS**; 2	NWS; 6	THS; 2	CLT; 5			RSD; 7								1st	33398	
1964	Bud Moore Engineering	8	Pontiac	CON; 2																																																														48th	2928	
1964	Bill Stroppe	15	Mercury		AUG; 4																																																													48th	2928	
1964	Sherman Utsman	61	Ford			JSP; 14																																																												48th	2928	
1964	Ray Osborne	92	Ford				SVH; 10																																																											48th	2928	
1964	Bud Moore Engineering	8	Mercury					RSD; 29	DAY	DAY	DAY	RCH	BRI	GPS	BGS	ATL	AWS	HBO	PIF	CLB	NWS	MAR	SVH	DAR	LGY	HCY	SBO	CLT	GPS	ASH	ATL	CON	NSV	CHT	BIR	VAL	PIF	DAY	ODS	OBS	BRR	ISP	GLN	LIN	BRI	NSV	MBS	AWS	DTS	ONA	CLB	BGS	STR	DAR	HCY	RCH	ODS	HBO	MAR	SVH	NWS	CLT	HAR	AUG	JAC	48th	2928	

===== Daytona 500 =====
Year	Team	Manufacturer	Start	Finish
1959	E. C. Wilson	Chevy	7	5
1960	Holman-Moody	Ford	7	41
1961	Bud Moore Engineering	Pontiac	2	2
1962	Bud Moore Engineering	Pontiac	4	3
1963	Bud Moore Engineering	Pontiac	26	8

Achievements
Preceded by Ned Jarrett; 1961	NASCAR Grand National Champion; 1962–1963	Succeeded by Richard Petty; 1964
