= Pancho Alvarez =

American stock car racing driver

- Born: Tampa, Florida, U.S.

NASCAR Cup Series career
- 1 race run over 1 year
- Best finish: 191st (1952)
- First race: 1952 Palm Beach 100 (Palm Beach)
Wins	Top tens	Poles
0	0	0

Pancho Alvarez is an American stock car racing driver. A long-time sportsman and modified driver in the state of Florida, he competed in one NASCAR Grand National Series race in his career.

== Career ==
A native of Tampa, Florida, Alvarez won the Florida West Coast Stock Car Championship in 1954. He spent most of his career racing on local tracks in the Tampa Bay Area and Polk County, Florida, although he also raced throughout the Southeast, winning multiple track championships.

Alvarez competed in a single major NASCAR-sanctioned race in his career, racing in the inaugural event of the 1952 NASCAR Grand National season at Palm Beach Speedway on January 20, 1952. Starting ninth in the event, he finished 24th, crashing heavily on the race's 113th lap.

== Motorsports career results ==
=== NASCAR ===
(key) (Bold – Pole position awarded by qualifying time. Italics – Pole position earned by points standings or practice time. * – Most laps led.)

==== Grand National Series ====
NASCAR Grand National Series results
Year	Team	No.	Make	1	2	3	4	5	6	7	8	9	10	11	12	13	14	15	16	17	18	19	20	21	22	23	24	25	26	27	28	29	30	31	32	33	34	NGNC	Pts
1952	Alvarez Racing	94	Olds	WPB; 24	DAB	JAX	NWS	MAR	CLB	LWD	MCN	LHN	DAR	DYN	CNF	HLF	TLD	OCC	CHA	MSF	SFP	OSW	MRO	MRS	SBD	RHR	AWS	DAR	MCN	LHN	DYN	WIL	OCC	MAR	NWS	LWD	WPB	191st	-
