= 1953 Wilkes 160 =

Auto race held at North Wilkesboro Speedway in 1953

Race details
- Race 35 of 37 in the 1953 NASCAR Grand National Series season
- North Wilkesboro Speedway
- Date: October 11, 1953
- Official name: Wilkes 160
- Location: North Wilkesboro Speedway, North Wilkesboro, North Carolina
- Course: Permanent racing facility
- Course length: 0.625 miles (1.006 km)
- Distance: 160 laps, 100.0 mi (160.9 km)
- Weather: Mild with temperatures of 78.1 °F (25.6 °C); wind speeds of 8 miles per hour (13 km/h)
- Average speed: 71.202 mph (114.589 km/h)
- Attendance: 2,000

Pole position
Driver	Buck Baker	Bob Griffin

Most laps led
Driver	Buck Baker	Bob Griffin
- Laps: 80

Winner
No. 87	Speedy Thompson	Buckshot Morris

Television in the United States
- Network: untelevised
- Announcers: none

The 1953 Wilkes 160 was a NASCAR Grand National Series event that was held on October 11, 1953, at North Wilkesboro Speedway in North Wilkesboro, North Carolina.

The race car drivers still had to commute to the races using the same stock cars that competed in a typical weekend's race through a policy of homologation (and under their own power). This policy was in effect until roughly 1975. By 1980, NASCAR had completely stopped tracking the year model of all the vehicles and most teams did not take stock cars to the track under their own power anymore.

== Background ==
North Wilkesboro carried a reputation as one of the fastest short-tracks in auto racing in the late 1940s and 1950s. In 1950, speeds reached 73 mph at the track, compared to the next fastest short-track, Charlotte Speedway, where top speeds only reached 66 mph. Most of the fans in the early years of the sport saw the track as notorious for being a great venue to watch races between the legendary racers of the time. Racing at North Wilkesboro was intense and physical.

The 1950 Wilkes 200 was the second Grand National Series race held at North Wilkesboro Speedway. Twenty-six cars entered the race. Twenty-one-year-old Fireball Roberts qualified with a lap speed of 73.266 mph on the dirt track for his first ever Grand National pole, but engine problems dropped him out of the running. Fonty Flock started in the third position and led the most laps in the race with 104, but engine troubles also ended his day. Ultimately, Leon Sales led eight of the 200 laps to become the victor, the fourth NASCAR driver to win an event in his debut race. Jack Smith finished second after leading 55 laps in the race.

After hosting only one NASCAR event in 1949 and one in 1950, the track began running two Grand National Series events per year in 1951 (with the exception of 1956, when only one race was held; the track was being prepared for pavement). One race was held in the spring, normally in late March or early April, and another was held in the fall, normally in late September or early October. In 1957, owner Enoch Stanley had the 5/8-mile track paved.

The Wilkes 200 in 1952 turned into a battle between brothers. Two sets of brothers competed in the race, and they took the top four spots at the finish. The Flock Brothers (Fonty Flock and Tim Flock) were strong, but the Thomas brothers (Herb Thomas and Donald Thomas) had the better outcome. Herb Thomas, driving his 1952 "Fabulous" Hudson Hornet, won the pole, led 192 of the 200 laps, and grabbed the victory. Fonty Flock led the first eight laps and finished the race second. Donald Thomas, also in a 1952 "Fabulous" Hudson Hornet, finished third, and Tim Flock finished fourth. Eleven of the 27 cars entered in the race finished. Six of the top nine positions were driving Hudson Hornets.

== Race report ==
It took one hour and twenty-four minutes to race 160 laps on a dirt oval track spanning 0.625 miles (1.006 km). Thirteen lead changes were given amongst four different drivers. Three cautions were given for 16 laps in front of 2000 loyal spectators. Herb Thomas would make his first finish outside the top six in 25 races in this event.

The top ten finishers were: Speedy Thompson (defeating Flock by two laps), Fonty Flock, Ray Duhigg (finished in a car owned by Julian Petty), Bob Welborn, Lee Petty (father of Richard Petty who started his NASCAR career six years later), Buck Baker, Bill Blair, Joe Eubanks, Jimmie Lewallen, and Bub King. Ralph Dutton was the last-place finisher of the race. The mysterious events surrounding Herb Thomas' first finish outside the top six involved a routine pit stop to put gasoline. After that, it was certainly whether Thomas finished the race in a timely manner or not.

Not all the driver numbers have been preserved through the years due to the habit of early NASCAR scorers to throw non-essential statistics into the garbage after each race. Any statistics that remain were kept because they were deemed to be "essential information". Arden Mounts drove in this race (and later at the 1955 Southern 500 and the 1956 Southern 500). Pete Stewart made his NASCAR Cup Series début here. Although the race had no bearing on the season ending points championship, the race was of extreme importance to Petty.

The average speed was 71.202 miles per hour (114.589 km/h) while Buck Baker qualified with a speed of 78.288 miles per hour (125.992 km/h). T.H. King, Boyce Hagler and Smokey Yunick were the most notable crew chiefs that played a role in the race. They had Bub King, Buck Baker and Herb Thomas as their drivers.

=== Timeline ===
Section reference:

- Start: Curtis Turner was leading the racing grid as the green flag was waved in the air.
- Lap 7: Buck Baker took over the lead from Curtis Turner.
- Lap 8: Curtis Turner took over the lead from Buck Baker.
- Lap 9: Buck Baker took over the lead from Curtis Turner.
- Lap 11: Curtis Turner took over the lead from Buck Baker.
- Lap 18: Buck Baker took over the lead from Curtis Turner.
- Lap 70: Fonty Flock took over the lead from Buck Baker.
- Lap 89: Buck Baker took over the lead from Fonty Flock.
- Lap 104: Fonty Flock took over the lead from Buck Baker.
- Lap 106: Curtis Turner took over the lead from Fonty Flock.
- Lap 110: Buck Baker took over the lead from Curtis Turner.
- Lap 120: Fonty Flock took over the lead from Buck Baker.
- Lap 136: Speedy Thompson took over the lead from Fonty Flock.
- Finish: Speedy Thompson was officially declared the winner of the event.

=== Results ===
Pos	Grid	Car #	Driver	Owner	Make	Laps	Laps led	Status	Winnings
1		46	Speedy Thompson	Buckshot Morris	'53 Oldsmobile	160	25	Running	$1000
2		14	Fonty Flock	Frank Christian	'53 Hudson	158	37	Running	$700
3		44	Ray Duhigg	Julian Petty	'52 Plymouth	156	0	Running	$450
4		24	Bob Welborn	J.O. Goode	'51 Plymouth	156	0	Running	$350
5		42	Lee Petty	Petty Enterprises	'53 Dodge	155	0	Running	$200
6	1	87	Buck Baker	Bob Griffin	'53 Oldsmobile	155	80		$150
7		2	Bill Blair	Bill Blair	'53 Oldsmobile	155	0		$125
8		82	Joe Eubanks	Phil Oates	'52 Hudson	154	0		$100
9		22	Jimmie Lewallen	R.G. Shelton	'53 Oldsmobile	153	0		$75
10		55	Bub King	Bub King	'53 Oldsmobile	153	0		$50
11		58	Johnny Patterson	H.B. Ranier	'53 Hudson	153	0		$25
12		93	Donald Thomas	Herb Thomas	'53 Hudson	153	0		$25
13		91	Tim Flock	Ted Chester	'53 Hudson	152	0		$25
14		51	Gober Sosebee	Gober Sosebee	'53 Oldsmobile	151	0		$25
15		92	Herb Thomas	Herb Thomas	'53 Hudson	151	0		$25
16			Ralph Liguori	Ralph Liguori	'51 Plymouth	149	0		$25
17		08	Arden Mounts	Gene Comstock	'51 Hudson	143	0		$25
18			Bob Walden	Bob Walden	'50 Plymouth	143	0		$25
19			Parks Surratt		'51 Plymouth	141	0		$25
20		93	Ted Chamberlain	Ted Chamberlain	'50 Plymouth	139	0		$25
21			Clyde Minter	Clyde Minter	'50 Mercury	136	0		$25
22		41	Curtis Turner		'53 Oldsmobile	131	18		$25
23		80	Jim Paschal		'53 Dodge	125	0		$25
24		120	Dick Rathmann	Walt Chapman	'53 Hudson	124	0		$25
25		19	Fred Dove	Fred Dove	'50 Ford	110	0		$25
26			Slim Rominger	Slim Rominger	'50 Oldsmobile	84	0		$25
27			Don Vershure		'53 Hudson	53	0		$25
28		167	Elton Hildreth	Elton Hildreth	'53 Nash	41	0		$25
29			Bud Jones		'50 Plymouth	36	0		$25
30			Pete Stewart		'51 Ford	20	0		$25
31			Ralph Dutton		'53 Dodge		0		$25

==== Race summary ====
- Lead changes: 13
- Cautions: 3 for 16 laps
- Red flags: N/A
- Time of race: 1:24:16
- Average speed: 71.202
- Margin of Victory: N/A

Preceded by inaugural race	Wilkes County 160 races 1953	Succeeded by 1954
