= Speedy Thompson =

American racing driver (1926–1972)

Alfred "Speedy" Thompson
- Speedy Thompson is adoring his fans after winning the 1960 National 400 in Charlotte
- Born: April 3, 1926; Monroe, North Carolina, U.S.
- Died: April 2, 1972 (aged 45); Charlotte, North Carolina, U.S.
- Cause of death: Heart attack resulting in racing crash
- Achievements: 1957 Southern 500 Winner
- Awards: Inducted in the National Motorsports Press Association's Hall of Fame and Georgia Automobile Racing Hall of Fame

NASCAR Cup Series career
- 197 races run over 14 years
- Best finish: 3rd (1956, 1957, 1958 and 1959)
- First race: 1950 Vernon Fairgrounds race
- Last race: 1971 World 600 (Charlotte)
- First win: 1953 Central City Speedway race
- Last win: 1960 Capital City 200 (Richmond)
Wins	Top tens	Poles
20	105	19
- Statistics up to date as of July 24, 2026.

Alfred Bruce "Speedy" Thompson (April 3, 1926 – April 2, 1972) was an American stock car racer in the NASCAR Grand National series from 1950 to 1971, capturing 20 wins along the way.

== Racing career ==
Thompson made his debut in 1950 and won two of the seven races he competed in 1953 in the No. 46 Buckshot Morris Oldsmobile (including the 1953 Wilkes 160). Thompson made 15 starts in 1955 and made a serious attack on the Championship the next year, competing in 42 races in Carl Kiekhaefer's factory-backed Chryslers and Dodges, winning eight times and finishing third in points. 1957 saw a switch to Hugh Babb's and his own Chevrolet's and another third-place result, capturing only two victories that year. Speedy drove his own Chevy for the entire 1958 season, and another third place was the reward for his four victories in 38 starts.

In 1957, Thompson set the 500-mile speed record for stock cars with an average speed of 100.1 mph. This record was quickly broken by other drivers and by Speedy himself. In 1959, he became a charter member of the "Pure Record Club" along with Fireball Roberts, Elmo Langley, and Richard Petty who set the fastest qualifying speed in each make of automobile competing.

Another third place in points came in 1959 from 29 starts in a variety of different cars, this time with no wins. 1959 would be Thompson's last full-time effort in the series (participating in 24 different racing events including the 1959 Hickory 250) and he left Grand National after the 1962 season, choosing to race at late models at local North Carolina short tracks. He returned to NASCAR's top series, then called the Winston Cup, in 1971 for the World 600 where he finished 16th.

== Death ==
During a late model race on Easter Sunday, April 2, 1972, at Metrolina Fairgrounds in Charlotte, Thompson had a seizure on the 21st lap, causing him to crash into a rail. He was pronounced dead on arrival at the hospital, one day before his 46th birthday. The medical examiner said that he died of natural causes, an acute coronary occlusion.

== Awards ==
Thompson was inducted into the National Motorsports Press Association's Hall of Fame and the Georgia Automobile Racing Hall of Fame.

== Motorsports career results ==
=== NASCAR ===
(key) (Bold – Pole position awarded by qualifying time. Italics – Pole position earned by points standings or practice time. * – Most laps led. ** – All laps led.)

==== Grand National Series ====
NASCAR Grand National Series results
Year	Team	No.	Make	1	2	3	4	5	6	7	8	9	10	11	12	13	14	15	16	17	18	19	20	21	22	23	24	25	26	27	28	29	30	31	32	33	34	35	36	37	38	39	40	41	42	43	44	45	46	47	48	49	50	51	52	53	54	55	56	NGNC	Pts	Ref
1950	Bruce Thompson		Plymouth	DAB	CLT	LAN	MAR	CAN	VER	DSP	MCF	CLT	HBO	DSP	HAM	DAR	LAN	NWS	VER; 21	MAR	WIN	HBO																																						–	–	
1951	Leland Colvin	25	Olds	DAB; 17																																																								75th	120	
1951	Leland Colvin	25	Plymouth		CLT; 30	NMO	GAR	HBO	ASF	NWS	MAR	CAN	CLS	CLB	DSP	GAR	GRS	BAI	HEI																																									75th	120	
1951			Studebaker																	AWS; 5	MCF	ALS	MSF	FMS	MOR	ABS	DAR	CLB	CCS	LAN	CLT	DSP	WIL	HBO	TPN	PGS	MAR	OAK	NWS	HMS	JSP	ATL	GAR	NMO																75th	120	
1952	Bruce Root	21	Ford	PBS	DAB	JSP	NWS	MAR	CLB	ATL	CCS	LAN	DAR; 19	DSP	CAN	HAY	FMS	HBO	CLT	MSF	NIF	OSW	MON	MOR	PPS	MCF	AWS																																	37th	656	
1952	Sam Knox	51	Ford																									DAR; 14	CCS	LAN	DSP	WIL	HBO	MAR	NWS	ATL	PBS																							37th	656	
1953	Buckshot Morris	12	Olds	PBS	DAB	HAR	NWS	CLT	RCH	CCS	LAN	CLB	HCY	MAR	PMS	RSP; 2	LOU	FIF	LAN	TCS	WIL; 6	MCF	PIF	MOR	ATL	RVS	LCF	DAV	HBO	AWS	PAS	HCY		CCS; 1																										11th	2958	
1953	Bob Pronger	46	Olds																														DAR; 7																											11th	2958	
1953	Buckshot Morris	46	Olds																																LAN; 3	BLF	WIL; 2	NWS; 1	MAR	ATL																				11th	2958	
1954	Buckshot Morris	12	Olds	PBS	DAB; 20	JSP	ATL	OSP	OAK	NWS	HBO	CCS	LAN	WIL	MAR	SHA	RSP; 27	CLT	GAR	CLB; 4	LND	HCY; 9	MCF	WGS	PIF; 21	AWS; 18	SFS	GRS	MOR	OAK	CLT	SAN	COR																											23rd	1480	
1954	Buckshot Morris	12	Buick																															DAR; 10	CCS	CLT	LAN	MAS	MAR	NWS																				23rd	1480	
1955	Griffin Motors Racing	87	Olds	TCS	PBS	JSP	DAB	OSP	CLB	HBO	NWS	MGY	LAN	CLT; 17	HCY																					MAS; 2	RSP; 11	DAR; 45	MGY	LAN; 23																				15th	2452	
1955	Don Oliver	5	Olds													ASF; 6	TUS																																											15th	2452	
1955	Frank Christian	14	Chevy															MAR; 18	RCH	NCF; 24	FOR	LIN	MCF	FON	AIR																																			15th	2452	
1955		71	Olds																							CLT; 15																																		15th	2452	
1955	Thomas Racing	92	Buick																								PIF; 13	CLB	AWS	MOR	ALS	NYF	SAN	CLT	FOR																									15th	2452	
1955	Ike Kiser	34	Ford																																						RSP; 17	GPS																		15th	2452	
1955	DePaolo Engineering	297	Ford																																								MAS; 1*	CLB																15th	2452	
1955	Carl Kiekhaefer	30	Chrysler																																										MAR; 1	LVP														15th	2452	
1955	Carl Kiekhaefer	20	Chrysler																																												NWS; 7													15th	2452	
1955	DePaolo Engineering	297	Hudson																																													HBO; 21												15th	2452	
1956	Mauri Rose	25	Chevy	HCY; 30	CLT; 17	WSS	PBS	ASF																																																				3rd	8328	
1956	Carl Kiekhaefer	500	Dodge						DAB; 71	PBS	WIL; 10					CLB; 1*		GPS; 15			MAR; 2*	LIN; 11											RSP; 2			CHI; 4	CCF; 1	MGY; 4	OKL; 11	ROA; 18	OBS	SAN	NOR			POR														3rd	8328	
1956	Carl Kiekhaefer	500	Chrysler									ATL; 2																																																3rd	8328	
1956	Carl Kiekhaefer	501	Dodge										NWS; 18*																																MYB; 5															3rd	8328	
1956	Carl Kiekhaefer	00	Chrysler											LAN; 37																																														3rd	8328	
1956	Carl Kiekhaefer	300	Dodge												RCH; 3																																													3rd	8328	
1956	Carl Kiekhaefer	300C	Chrysler														**CON**; 1*		**HCY**; 1**	HBO; 2*			**CLT**; 1*	POR	EUR	NYF; 7	MER	MAS; 19	CLT; 1*	MCF; 1*	POR	AWS; 26		PIF; 7	CSF																									3rd	8328	
1956	DePaolo Engineering	296	Ford																																									PIF; 5																3rd	8328	
1956	Carl Kiekhaefer	57	Chrysler																																												**DAR**; 2	CSH; 19												3rd	8328	
1956	Carl Kiekhaefer	57	Dodge																																														CLT; 7											3rd	8328	
1956	Carl Kiekhaefer	67	Dodge																																															LAN; 3	POR	CLB								3rd	8328	
1956	Carl Kiekhaefer	300	Chrysler																																																		**HBO**; 3	NWP; 18	CLT; 6		MAR; 4	HCY; 1*	WIL; 3*	3rd	8328	
1956	Carl Kiekhaefer	500B	Dodge																																																					CCF; 4				3rd	8328	
1957	Hugh Babb	46	Chevy	WSS	CON	TIC	DAB; 8	CON; 3	WIL; 3	HBO; 2	AWS; 2	NWS; 16	LAN; 3	CLT; 20	**PIF**; 15	GBF; 14	POR	CCF; 9	RCH; 17	MAR; 11	POR	EUR	LIN; 5	LCS; 5	ASP																																			3rd	8580	
1957	Speedy Thompson	46	Chevy																							**NWP**; 8	CLB; 5	CPS	PIF; 4		RSP; 4	CLT; 4	**MAS**; 22	POR	HCY; 23	NOR; 9	**LCS**; 1**	GLN	KPC	LIN; 2	OBS		DAR; 1*	NYF	AWS; 18	CSF	SCF	LAN; 31	CLB; 19		CLT; 17	MAR; 28	NBR; 6	CON; 6	NWS; 4	GBF; 2				3rd	8580	
1957	Whitey Norman	1A	Ford																											JAC; 13																														3rd	8580	
1957	Bobby Keck	96	Chevy																																							MYB; 12																		3rd	8580	
1957	Dick Beaty	34	Ford																																															CCF; 15										3rd	8580	
1958	Speedy Thompson	46	Chevy	FAY; 9	DAB; 48	**CON**; 3	FAY; 19	WIL; 20	HBO; 3	FAY; 3	CLB; 1	**PIF**; 1	ATL; 19	CLT	MAR	ODS	OBS	GPS; 17	GBF; 4	STR	NWS; 14	BGS	TRN; 9	RSD	CLB; 11	NBS; 6	**REF**; 5	LIN; 26	**HCY**; 3	AWS; 3	RSP; 5	MCC	SLS	TOR	BUF	MCF; 3	BEL; 7	BRR; 7	**CLB**; 1	NSV; 16	AWS; 4	BGS	**MBS**; 15		CLT; 2	BIR	CSF	GAF; 5	**RCH**; 1*	HBO; 19	SAS; 29	MAR; 2	NWS; 3	ATL; 29						3rd	8792	
1958	Steve Pierce	1	Chevy																																									DAR; 14																3rd	8792	
1959	Steve Pierce	1	Chevy	FAY	DAY; 16	DAY; 10	HBO; 13	CON; 5	ATL; 4	WIL; 21			**NWS**; 17*	REF; 2	HCY; 6*	MAR; 19	TRN				PIF; 14	GPS; 15	ATL; 26	CLB																																				3rd	7684	
1959	Don Angel	3	Ford								BGS; 13																																																	3rd	7684	
1959	Bruce Thompson	2	Chevy									CLB; 13						CLT; 4	NSV	ASP						RCH; 10	BGS	AWS; 14			CLT; 24	MBS; 22	CLT	NSV													CON; 8													3rd	7684	
1959		12	Chevy																						WIL; 24																																			3rd	7684	
1959	Doc White	41	Ford																										DAY; 11	HEI																														3rd	7684	
1959	Gerald Duke	92	Ford																																AWS; 37	BGS	GPS	CLB																						3rd	7684	
1959	W. J. Ridgeway	22	Chevy																																				DAR; 14	HCY	RCH	CSF		MAR; 5																3rd	7684	
1959	W. H. Watson	61	Pontiac																																								HBO; 18																	3rd	7684	
1959	Beau Morgan	15	Ford																																										AWS; 13	NWS; 15														3rd	7684	
1960	Bruce Thompson	2	Chevy	CLT; 5	CLB																																																							25th	5658	
1960	Matthews Racing	94	Ford			DAY; 9	DAY	DAY; 62	CLT	NWS	PHO	CLB																																																25th	5658	
1960	Wood Brothers Racing	20	Ford										MAR; DNQ	HCY	WIL	BGS	GPS	AWS	DAR	PIF	HBO	RCH	HMS																																					25th	5658	
1960	Donlavey Racing	90	Ford																					CLT; 25	BGS	DAY	HEI	MAB	MBS	ATL; 12	BIR	NSV	AWS	PIF	CLB	SBO	BGS	DAR; 39	HCY	CSF	GSP	HBO	MAR	NWS	CLT; DNQ															25th	5658	
1960	Wood Brothers Racing	21	Ford																																										CLT; 1	RCH; 1*	ATL; 4													25th	5658	
1961	Beau Morgan	16	Ford	CLT	JSP	DAY	DAY	DAY	PIF	AWS	HMS	ATL	GPS	HBO	BGS	MAR	NWS	CLB	HCY	RCH	MAR	DAR	CLT	CLT; 17	RSD	ASP	CLT; 41	PIF	BIR	GPS	BGS	NOR	HAS	STR	DAY	ATL	CLB	MBS	BRI	NSV	BGS	AWS	RCH	SBO	DAR	HCY	RCH	CSF	ATL	MAR	NWS									62nd	1564	
1961	Wood Brothers Racing	21	Ford																																																	CLT; 11	BRI	GPS	HBO					62nd	1564	
1962	Holman-Moody	15	Ford	CON	AWS	DAY	DAY; 23	DAY; 17	CON	AWS	SVH	HBO	RCH	CLB	NWS	GPS	MBS	MAR	BGS	BRI	RCH	HCY	CON	DAR	PIF	CLT	ATL	BGS	AUG	RCH	SBO	DAY	CLB	ASH	GPS	AUG	SVH	MBS	BRI	CHT	NSV	HUN	AWS	STR	BGS	PIF	VAL	DAR	HCY	RCH	DTS	AUG	MAR	NWS						42nd	2522	
1962	Petty Enterprises	41	Plymouth																																																				CLT; 9	ATL				42nd	2522	
1971	Junior Fields	91	Chevy	RSD	DAY	DAY	DAY	ONT	RCH	CAR	HCY	BRI	ATL	CLB	GPS	SMR	NWS	MAR	DAR	SBO	TAL	ASH	KPT	CLT; 16	DOV	MCH	RSD	HOU	GPS	DAY	BRI	AST	ISP	TRN	NSV	ATL	BGS	ONA	MCH	TAL	CLB	HCY	DAR	MAR	CLT	DOV	CAR	MGR	RCH	NWS	TWS									–	–	

===== Daytona 500 =====
Year	Team	Manufacturer	Start	Finish
1959	Steve Pierce	Chevrolet	31	10
1960	Matthews Racing	Ford	17	62
1962	Holman-Moody	Ford	33	17

==== Convertible Division ====
NASCAR Convertible Division results
Year	Team	No.	Make	1	2	3	4	5	6	7	8	9	10	11	12	13	14	15	NCC	Pts	Ref
1959	Bruce Thompson	2	Chevy	DAY	FAY	RCH	HCY	MRL	CLT	HBO	DAR	CLB	AWS	BGS	MAR	**CLB**; 5	GPS	CLT	69th	168	
