= 1954 Wilkes County 160 =

Auto race held at North Wilkesboro Speedway in 1954

Race details
- Race 7 of 37 in the 1954 NASCAR Grand National Series season
- North Wilkesboro Speedway
- Date: April 4, 1954
- Official name: Wilkes County 160
- Location: North Wilkesboro Speedway, North Wilkesboro, North Carolina
- Course: Permanent racing facility
- Course length: 0.625 miles (1.00 km)
- Distance: 160 laps, 100 mi (160 km)
- Weather: Chilly with temperatures of 64.9 °F (18.3 °C); wind speeds of 15.9 miles per hour (25.6 km/h)
- Average speed: 68.435 miles per hour (110.135 km/h)
- Attendance: 5,500

Pole position
| Driver | Gober Sosebee | Gober Sosebee |

Most laps led
| Driver | Gober Sosebee | Gober Sosebee |
- Laps: 112

Winner
| No. 3 | Dick Rathman | John Ditz |

Television in the United States
- Network: untelevised
- Announcers: none

The 1954 Wilkes County 160 was a NASCAR Grand National Series event held on April 4, 1954, at North Wilkesboro Speedway in North Wilkesboro, North Carolina. Until the 1957 running of the Wilkes 160, North Wilkesboro Speedway was a dirt oval track.

== Background ==
North Wilkesboro carried a reputation as one of the fastest short-tracks in auto racing in the late 1940s and 1950s. In 1950, speeds reached 73 mph at the track, compared to the next fastest short-track, Charlotte Speedway, where top speeds only reached 66 mph. Most of the fans in the early years of the sport saw the track as notorious for being a great venue to watch races between the legendary racers of the time. Racing at North Wilkesboro was intense and physical.

The 1950 Wilkes 200 was the second Grand National Series race held at North Wilkesboro Speedway. Twenty-six cars entered the race. Twenty-one-year-old Fireball Roberts qualified with a lap speed of 73.266 mph on the dirt track for his first ever Grand National pole, but engine problems dropped him out of the running. Fonty Flock started in the third position and led the most laps in the race with 104, but engine troubles also ended his day. Ultimately, Leon Sales led eight of the 200 laps to become the victor, the fourth NASCAR driver to win an event in his debut race. Jack Smith finished second after leading 55 laps in the race.

After hosting only one NASCAR event in 1949 and one in 1950, the track began running two Grand National Series events per year in 1951 (with the exception of 1956, when only one race was held; the track was being prepared for pavement). One race was held in the spring, normally in late March or early April, and another was held in the fall, normally in late September or early October. In 1957, owner Enoch Stanley had the 5/8-mile track paved.

The Wilkes 200 in 1952 turned into a battle between brothers. Two sets of brothers competed in the race, and they took the top four spots at the finish. The Flock Brothers (Fonty Flock and Tim Flock) were strong, but the Thomas brothers (Herb Thomas and Donald Thomas) had the better outcome. Herb Thomas, driving his 1952 "Fabulous" Hudson Hornet, won the pole, led 192 of the 200 laps, and grabbed the victory. Fonty Flock led the first eight laps and finished the race second. Donald Thomas, also in a 1952 "Fabulous" Hudson Hornet, finished third, and Tim Flock finished fourth. Eleven of the 27 cars entered in the race finished. Six of the top nine positions were driving Hudson Hornets.

Herb Thomas started on the pole for the 1953 Wilkes 200 with his record-setting qualifying speed of 78.424 mph on the dirt surface. Outside pole sitter Tim Flock led the first 100 laps before experiencing engine problems. Curtis Turner took the lead on Lap 101 and continued the lead until his car also succumbed to engine troubles nine laps later. Thomas in his Number 92 Hudson Hornet only lead 18 laps in the race but ended the race by taking his third consecutive win at North Wilkesboro. Starting from the third spot, Dick Rathmann led 70 laps and finished behind Herb Thomas. Fonty Flock managed to work his way up from the fourth starting position to the front and led three laps before dropping back and finishing third.

Pole sitter Buck Baker ran 78.288 mph to gap the pole for the 1953 Wilkes 160. Baker ran strong and led the most laps in the race with 80 out front before falling back into the sixth-place position at the finish. Speedy Thompson led 25 laps, and Fonty Flock led 37. Curtis Turner led a total of 18 laps. At the end of the race, Thompson finished two laps ahead of second-place Flock. Thompson's win ended Herb Thomas and his Hudson Hornet's three-race winning streak at North Wilkesboro.

== Race report ==
It took one hour and twenty-seven minutes for the race to reach its full conclusion.

Dick Rathmann would acquire a significant victory over Herb Thomas by a margin of twenty seconds in front of five thousand and five hundred people. All 24 drivers that were involved in this racing event were born in the United States; no foreigners attempted to qualify for this event. Dick Rathman had overlapped the entire field at one time; making it sufficient for the veteran speedster to wheel his 1954 Hudson around the course on the final two laps with a flat tire to beat out Herb Thomas. The weather was freezing and cloudy skies were everywhere.

Gober Sosebee lost a wheel on the 114th lap and was forced to the pits. It was a wheel from Sosebee's car that almost cost Rathman the race. After returning to the battle, Sosebee was again moving back into the contest when another wheel snapped and landed in the middle of the track. Rathman's car clipped the wheel, blowing out his left front tire and almost wrecking the leader. Arden Mounts lost a wheel and smashed the fence in turn 1 on lap 44 and two laps later Ted Rambo, driving in eight place at the time, blew a tire and went through the fence on the Turn 1 near the same spot of Mounts. The race was held up to put out a fire in Rambo's car. The second and final caution came on 137 th lap when Bud Harless, blew a tire and flipped over the bank on the third turn. Rambo and Harless escaped without injury.

Notable speeds were: 68.454 miles per hour (110.166 km/h) as the average speed and 78.698 miles per hour (126.652 km/h) as the pole position speed. John Ditz would win his first race as an owner during this event; a diverse range of automobile manufacturers would enjoy starting positions within the relatively unregulated NASCAR atmosphere of the mid-1950s. Monetary winnings for each driver ranged from a then-incredible amount of $1,000 ($11,988.85 when considering inflation) to a meager $25 ($299.72 when considering inflation).

Total winnings for this race were $3,825 ($45,857.34 when considering inflation).

Notable crew chiefs who participated fully in the race were Stuart Nelson, Lee Petty, and John Carozza.

This race was also notable for being held the week before April 11, 1954; which has been analyzed by a computer search engine as being the least interesting day in the 20th century. Rock and roll music was "invented" at a New York City recording studio on April 12 (Monday) when Bill Haley & His Comets would record the incredibly famous song "Rock Around the Clock". "Rock Around the Clock" quickly became a number one single on both the US and UK charts and also re-entered the UK Singles Chart in the 1960s and 1970s.

No NASCAR Cup Series races were held on Sunday, April 11, 1954.

=== Finishers ===
1. Dick Rathmann
2. Herb Thomas
3. Joe Eubanks (the third and final driver to end the race on the lead lap)
4. Curtis Turner
5. Lee Petty
6. Ralph Liguori
7. Al Keller
8. Andy Winfree
9. Jim Paschal
10. Jimmie Lewallen
11. Bob Welborn
12. Gober Sosebee
13. Fred Dove
14. Billy Irvin
15. Buck Baker
16. Eddie Skinner (last driver to complete the entire race – 21 laps down)
17. Bud Harless* (involved in the only crash of the race)
18. Ralph Dutton*
19. Elton Hildreth* (drove a Nash vehicle)
20. Ted Rambo* (drove a Lincoln vehicle – also involved in the crash with Bud Harless)
21. Arden Mounts*
22. Dave Terrell*
23. Stan Kross*
24. Blackie Pitt*

* Driver failed to finish race

== Timeline ==
Section reference:

- Start of race: Gober Sosebee started the race with the pole position.
- Lap 12: Blackie Pitt had problems with his vehicle's wheel.
- Lap 26: Stan Kross' vehicle developed a problematic post on, forcing him to leave the race.
- Lap 31: Dave Terrell had a problem with his vehicle's bearings, causing him to withdraw from the race.
- Lap 44: Steering wheel problems ended Arden Mounts' day on the track.
- Lap 46: Ted Rambo had a terminal crash; forcing him to withdraw from the event.
- Lap 58: A hose problem on Elton Hildreth's vehicle meant that his race weekend was over prematurely.
- Lap 70: Ralph Dutton would see no more racing this weekend when his steering wheel started acting funny.
- Lap 95: Dick Rathmann takes over the lead from Gober Sosebee.
- Lap 97: Gober Sosebee takes over the lead from Dick Rathmann.
- Lap 115: Dick Rathmann takes over the lead from Gober Sosebee.
- Lap 129: Bud Harless had a terminal crash, forcing him to withdraw from the event.
- Finish: Dick Rathmann was officially declared the winner of the event.

| Preceded by 1953 | Wilkes County 160 races 1954 | Succeeded by 1955 |

| Previous race: 1954 NASCAR Grand National Series race at Oakland Stadium | NASCAR Grand National Series; 1954 season | Next race: 1954 NASCAR Grand National Series race at Orange Speedway |
