= NASCAR Cup Series at Richmond Raceway =

NASCAR Cup Series race at Richmond Raceway

NASCAR Cup Series
- Venue: Richmond Raceway
- Location: Richmond, Virginia, United States

Circuit information
- Surface: Asphalt
- Length: 0.75 mi (1.21 km)
- Turns: 4

Stock car races in the NASCAR Cup Series have been held at Richmond Raceway in Richmond, Virginia since 1953.

A second race in March was also held at the track from 1953 to 2024 until it was moved to Mexico for the 2025 season.

== Current race ==
Cook Out 400
- Corporate sponsor: Cook Out
- First race: 1958
- Distance: 300 miles (482.803 km)
- Laps: 400; Stage 1: 70; Stage 2: 160; Final stage: 170
- Previous names: Richmond 200 (1958); Capital City 200 (1959–1961); Capital City 300 (1962–1968); Capital City 250 (1969); Capital City 500 (1970–1975); Capital City 400 (1976–1980); Wrangler Sanfor-Set 400 (1981–1985); Wrangler Jeans Indigo 400 (1986–1987); Miller High Life 400 (1988–1989); Miller Genuine Draft 400 (1990–1995); Miller 400 (1996); Exide NASCAR Select Batteries 400 (1997–1999); Chevrolet Monte Carlo 400 (2000); Chevrolet Monte Carlo 400 with the Looney Tunes (2001–2002); Chevy Rock & Roll 400 (2003–2009); Air Guard 400 (2010); Wonderful Pistachios 400 (2011); Federated Auto Parts 400 (2012–2020 & 2022); Federated Auto Parts 400 Salute to First Responders (2021)
- Most wins (driver): Richard Petty (7)
- Most wins (team): Joe Gibbs Racing (8)
- Most wins (manufacturer): Chevrolet; Ford (19)

The Cook Out 400 is an annual NASCAR Cup Series stock car race held at the Richmond Raceway in Richmond, Virginia. Joey Logano is the defending winner of this event, having won it in 2026.

=== History ===
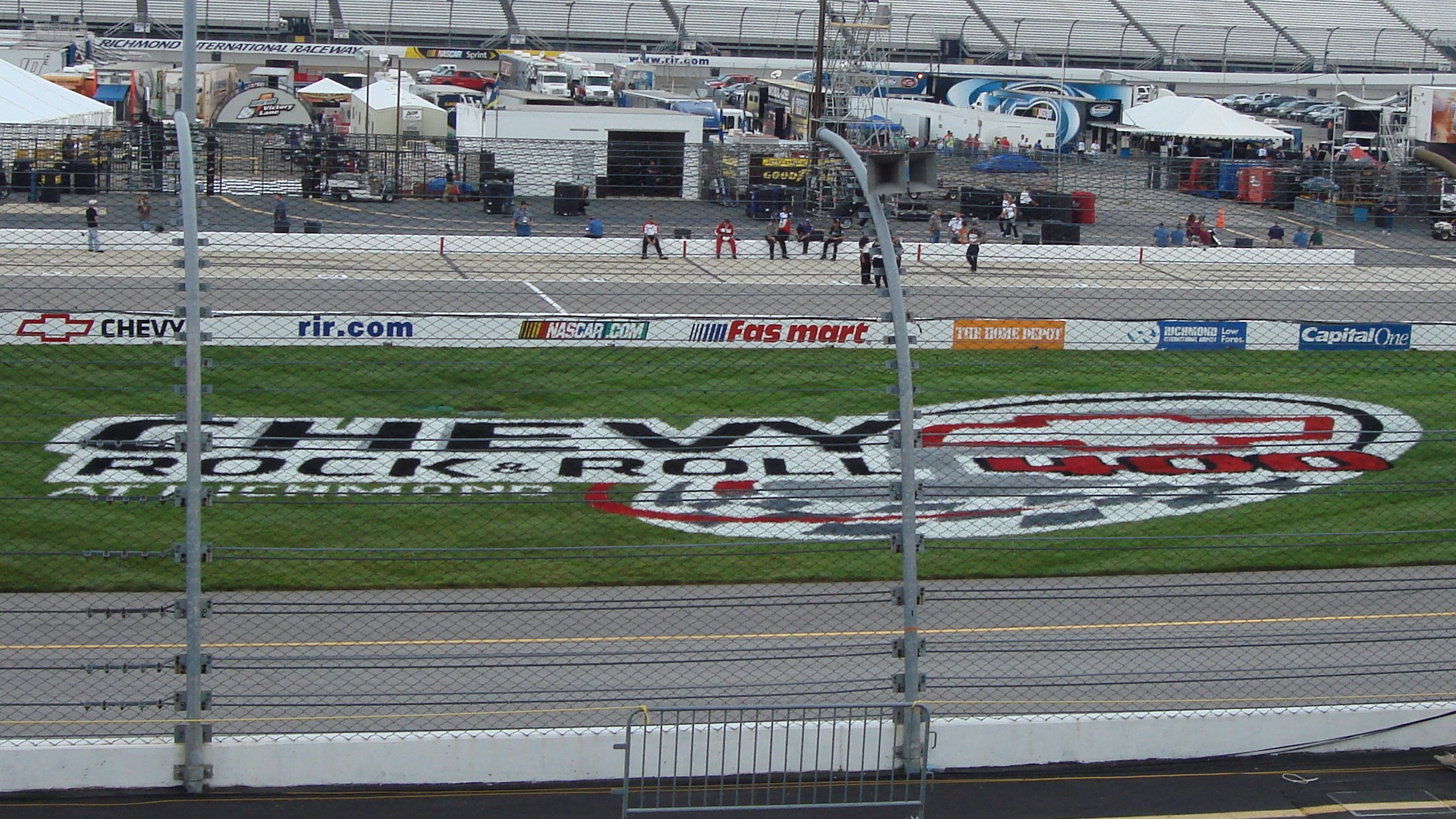
The 2008 race logo on the track's grass

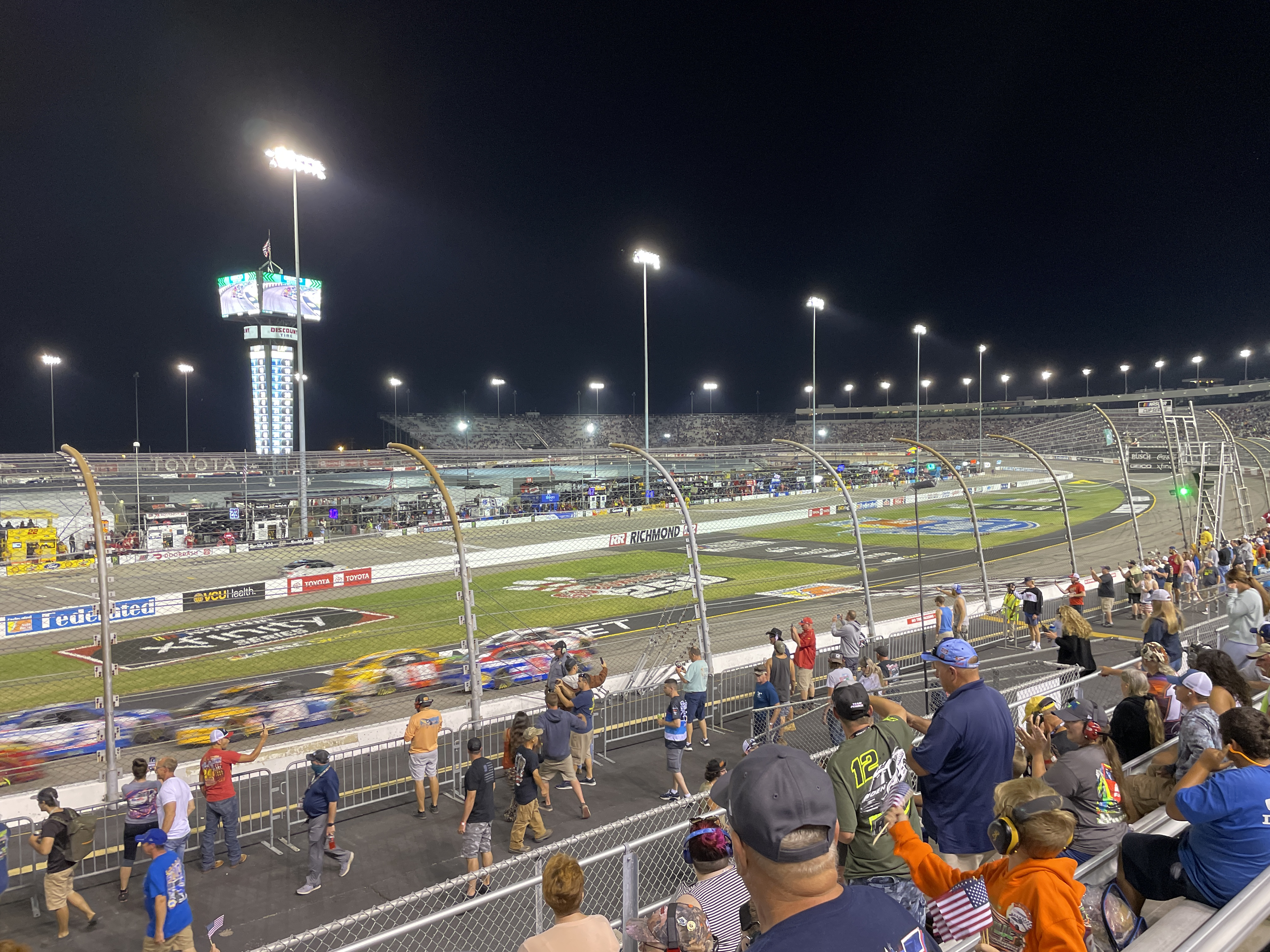
The cars getting the green flag after a restart in the 2021 race

Starting in 1991, the race was moved from Sunday afternoon to Saturday night. It became the second night race on the NASCAR schedule, following Bristol which took place a few weeks earlier.

From 2000 to 2009, the race was sponsored in some form by Chevrolet. For 2001 and 2002, the race sponsorship was in conjunction with Warner Bros., with Looney Tunes characters featured in several cars' paint jobs. For the 2003–2009 races, the race was known as the Chevy Rock and Roll 400, and various cars promoted various rock music acts. The 2010 race saw the sponsorship move from Chevrolet to the Air National Guard, a branch of the United States Air Force. The race was sponsored by Roll Global through its Wonderful Pistachios brand, a division of Roll Global subsidiary Paramount Nuts in 2011. On May 2, 2012, Federated Auto Parts and Richmond International Raceway announced that Federated Auto Parts would become the race's sponsor starting in 2012.

This race was previously the final race before the Cup Series playoffs (previously "the Chase") began since NASCAR implemented them for the 2004 season until 2018 when it was moved into the playoffs (replacing the race at Chicagoland which was moved to June). The Brickyard 400 became the last race before the playoffs in 2018, replacing Richmond, and was again in 2019 and then the Coke Zero Sugar 400 at Daytona became the last race of the playoffs in 2020 and still is today, excluding 2024. In 2022, the race was taken out of the playoffs and moved to August. In 2023, the race was moved again to the last weekend in July. In 2024, it was moved again to August. The track moved to Saturday Night in 2025, and remained that way for 2026.

When the race was run in close proximity to (and it occasionally being run on) Patriot Day (9/11), the Pledge of Allegiance was included as part of the opening ceremony. The 2021 race tweaked its stage length and took place on the 20th anniversary of the September 11 attacks. The race was called the Federated Auto Parts 400 Salute to First Responders.

Cook Out Restaurants would become the title sponsor of the race in 2023, replacing Federated Auto Parts.

==== Past winners ====
Year	Date	No.	Driver	Team	Manufacturer	Race Distance		Race Time	Average Speed (mph)	Report	Ref
Year	Date	No.	Driver	Team	Manufacturer	Laps	Miles (km)	Race Time	Average Speed (mph)	Report	Ref
1958	September 14	46	Speedy Thompson	Speedy Thompson	Chevrolet	200	100 (160.934)	1:43:40	57.878	Report	
1959	September 13	6	Cotton Owens	W.H. Watson	T-Bird	200	100 (160.934)	1:39:22	60.362	Report	
1960	October 23	21	Speedy Thompson	Wood Brothers Racing	Ford	200	100 (160.934)	1:34:08	63.739	Report	
1961	September 10	8	Joe Weatherly	Bud Moore Engineering	Pontiac	200	100 (160.934)	2:01:36	61.677	Report	
1962	September 9	8	Joe Weatherly	Bud Moore Engineering	Pontiac	300	150 (241.401)	2:18:30	64.981	Report	
1963	September 8	11	Ned Jarrett	Charles Robinson	Ford	300	150 (241.401)	2:15:04	66.339	Report	
1964	September 14	5	Cotton Owens	Cotton Owens	Dodge	300	150 (241.401)	2:25:16	61.955	Report	
1965	September 18	6	David Pearson	Cotton Owens	Dodge	300	150 (241.401)	2:27:35	60.983	Report	
1966	September 11	6	David Pearson	Cotton Owens	Dodge	300	150 (241.401)	2:23:07	62.886	Report	
1967	September 10	43	Richard Petty	Petty Enterprises	Plymouth	300	150 (241.401)	2:36:10	57.631	Report	
1968	September 8	43	Richard Petty	Petty Enterprises	Plymouth	300	187.5 (301.752)	2:11:20	85.659	Report	
1969	September 7	22	Bobby Allison	Mario Rossi	Dodge	462*	250.404 (402.986)	3:16:32	76.388	Report	
1970	September 13	43	Richard Petty	Petty Enterprises	Plymouth	500	271 (436.132)	3:19:34	81.476	Report	
1971	November 14	43	Richard Petty	Petty Enterprises	Plymouth	500	271 (436.132)	3:23:11	80.025	Report	
1972	September 10	43	Richard Petty	Petty Enterprises	Plymouth	500	271 (436.132)	3:34:14	75.899	Report	
1973	September 9	43	Richard Petty	Petty Enterprises	Dodge	500	271 (436.132)	4:13:17	63.215	Report	
1974	September 8	43	Richard Petty	Petty Enterprises	Dodge	500	271 (436.132)	4:12:22	64.43	Report	
1975	October 12	88	Darrell Waltrip	DiGard Motorsports	Chevrolet	500	271 (436.132)	3:18:34	81.886	Report	
1976	September 12	11	Cale Yarborough	Junior Johnson & Associates	Chevrolet	400	216.8 (348.905)	2:46:47	77.993	Report	
1977	September 11	5	Neil Bonnett	Jim Stacy	Dodge	400	216.8 (348.905)	2:41:18	80.644	Report	
1978	September 10	88	Darrell Waltrip	DiGard Motorsports	Chevrolet	400	216.8 (348.905)	2:43:19	79.568	Report	
1979	September 9	15	Bobby Allison	Bud Moore Engineering	Ford	400	216.8 (348.905)	2:41:23	80.604	Report	
1980	September 7	15	Bobby Allison	Bud Moore Engineering	Ford	400	216.8 (348.905)	2:43:10	79.722	Report	
1981	September 13	15	Benny Parsons	Bud Moore Engineering	Ford	400	216.8 (348.905)	3:05:50	69.998	Report	
1982	September 12	88	Bobby Allison	DiGard Motorsports	Chevrolet	400	216.8 (348.905)	2:37:06	82.8	Report	
1983	September 11	22	Bobby Allison	DiGard Motorsports	Buick	400	216.8 (348.905)	2:43:08	79.381	Report	
1984	September 9	11	Darrell Waltrip	Junior Johnson & Associates	Chevrolet	400	216.8 (348.905)	2:53:57	74.78	Report	
1985	September 8	11	Darrell Waltrip	Junior Johnson & Associates	Chevrolet	400	216.8 (348.905)	2:58:54	72.508	Report	
1986	September 7	25	Tim Richmond	Hendrick Motorsports	Chevrolet	400	216.8 (348.905)	3:05:24	70.161	Report	
1987	September 13	3	Dale Earnhardt	Richard Childress Racing	Chevrolet	400	216.8 (348.905)	3:03:56	67.074	Report	
1988*	September 11	28	Davey Allison	Ranier-Lundy	Ford	400	300 (482.803)	3:07:57	95.77	Report	
1989	September 10	27	Rusty Wallace	Blue Max Racing	Pontiac	400	300 (482.803)	3:23:40	88.38	Report	
1990	September 9	3	Dale Earnhardt	Richard Childress Racing	Chevrolet	400	300 (482.803)	3:08:21	95.567	Report	
1991*	September 7	33	Harry Gant	Leo Jackson Racing	Oldsmobile	400	300 (482.803)	2:57:35	101.361	Report	
1992	September 12	2	Rusty Wallace	Penske Racing	Pontiac	400	300 (482.803)	2:51:59	104.661	Report	
1993	September 11	2	Rusty Wallace	Penske Racing	Pontiac	400	300 (482.803)	3:00:09	99.917	Report	
1994	September 10	5	Terry Labonte	Hendrick Motorsports	Chevrolet	400	300 (482.803)	2:52:59	104.156	Report	
1995	September 9	2	Rusty Wallace	Penske Racing	Ford	400	300 (482.803)	2:52:19	104.459	Report	
1996	September 7	28	Ernie Irvan	Robert Yates Racing	Ford	400	300 (482.803)	2:50:40	105.469	Report	
1997	September 6	88	Dale Jarrett	Robert Yates Racing	Ford	400	300 (482.803)	2:45:04	109.047	Report	
1998	September 12	99	Jeff Burton	Roush Racing	Ford	400	300 (482.803)	3:15:41	91.985	Report	
1999	September 11	20	Tony Stewart	Joe Gibbs Racing	Pontiac	400	300 (482.803)	2:53:04	104.006	Report	
2000	September 9	24	Jeff Gordon	Hendrick Motorsports	Chevrolet	400	300 (482.803)	3:00:14	99.871	Report	
2001	September 8	28	Ricky Rudd	Robert Yates Racing	Ford	400	300 (482.803)	3:09:11	95.146	Report	
2002	September 7	17	Matt Kenseth	Roush Racing	Ford	400	300 (482.803)	3:09:54	94.787	Report	
2003	September 6	12	Ryan Newman	Penske Racing	Dodge	400	300 (482.803)	3:09:35	94.945	Report	
2004	September 11	19	Jeremy Mayfield	Evernham Motorsports	Dodge	400	300 (482.803)	3:01:55	98.946	Report	
2005	September 10	97	Kurt Busch	Roush Racing	Ford	400	300 (482.803)	3:02:37	98.567	Report	
2006	September 9	29	Kevin Harvick	Richard Childress Racing	Chevrolet	400	300 (482.803)	2:57:37	101.342	Report	
2007	September 8	48	Jimmie Johnson	Hendrick Motorsports	Chevrolet	400	300 (482.803)	3:16:03	91.813	Report	
2008	September 7*	48	Jimmie Johnson	Hendrick Motorsports	Chevrolet	400	300 (482.803)	3:14:13	92.68	Report	
2009	September 12	11	Denny Hamlin	Joe Gibbs Racing	Toyota	400	300 (482.803)	3:06:20	96.601	Report	
2010	September 11	11	Denny Hamlin	Joe Gibbs Racing	Toyota	400	300 (482.803)	2:52:55	104.096	Report	
2011	September 10	29	Kevin Harvick	Richard Childress Racing	Chevrolet	400	300 (482.803)	3:20:12	89.91	Report	
2012	September 8/9*	15	Clint Bowyer	Michael Waltrip Racing	Toyota	400	300 (482.803)	2:59:58	100.019	Report	
2013	September 7	99	Carl Edwards	Roush Fenway Racing	Ford	400	300 (482.803)	2:51:23	105.028	Report	
2014	September 6	2	Brad Keselowski	Team Penske	Ford	400	300 (482.803)	2:51:55	104.702	Report	
2015	September 12	20	Matt Kenseth	Joe Gibbs Racing	Toyota	400	300 (482.803)	2:59:22	100.353	Report	
2016	September 10	11	Denny Hamlin	Joe Gibbs Racing	Toyota	407*	305.25 (491.252)	3:31:33	85.778	Report	
2017	September 9	42	Kyle Larson	Chip Ganassi Racing	Chevrolet	404*	303 (487.631)	3:02:52	99.417	Report	
2018	September 22	18	Kyle Busch	Joe Gibbs Racing	Toyota	400	300 (482.803)	2:54:30	103.152	Report	
2019	September 21	19	Martin Truex Jr.	Joe Gibbs Racing	Toyota	400	300 (482.803)	2:57:27	101.437	Report	
2020	September 12	2	Brad Keselowski	Team Penske	Ford	400	300 (482.803)	2:56:42	101.868	Report	
2021	September 11	19	Martin Truex Jr.	Joe Gibbs Racing	Toyota	400	300 (482.803)	3:03:06	98.307	Report	
2022	August 14	4	Kevin Harvick	Stewart–Haas Racing	Ford	400	300 (482.803)	3:03:27	98.11	Report	
2023	July 30	17	Chris Buescher	RFK Racing	Ford	400	300 (482.803)	3:02:13	98.783	Report	
2024	August 11	3	Austin Dillon	Richard Childress Racing	Chevrolet	408*	306 (492.459)	3:03:19	100.155	Report	
2025	August 16	3	Austin Dillon	Richard Childress Racing	Chevrolet	400	300 (482.803)	3:11:14	94.126	Report	
2026	August 15	22	Joey Logano	Team Penske	Ford	400	300 (482.803)	3:03:02	98.343	Report	
2027	September 11									Report	

- 1969: Race shortened from 500 laps due to rain.
- 1988: Track reconfigured to 0.75 miles.
- 1991: Race moved to a Saturday night event.
- 2008: Race postponed from Saturday night to Sunday afternoon due to rain.
- 2012: Race started late due to rain; race finished on Sunday approximately 1:30am.
- 2016, 2017 and 2024: Race extended due to an overtime finish.

===== Multiple winners (drivers) =====
# Wins	Driver	Years won
7	Richard Petty	1967–1968, 1970–1974
5	Bobby Allison	1969, 1979–1980, 1982–1983
4	Darrell Waltrip	1975, 1978, 1984–1985
4	Rusty Wallace	1989, 1992–1993, 1995
3	Denny Hamlin	2009–2010, 2016
3	Kevin Harvick	2006, 2011, 2022
2	Speedy Thompson	1958, 1960
2	Joe Weatherly	1961–1962
2	Cotton Owens	1959, 1964
2	David Pearson	1965–1966
2	Dale Earnhardt	1987, 1990
2	Jimmie Johnson	2007–2008
2	Matt Kenseth	2002, 2015
2	Brad Keselowski	2014, 2020
2	Martin Truex Jr.	2019, 2021
2	Austin Dillon	2024–2025

===== Multiple winners (teams) =====
# Wins	Team	Years won
8	Joe Gibbs Racing	1999, 2009–2010, 2015–2016, 2018–2019, 2021
7	Petty Enterprises	1967–1968, 1970–1974
7	Team Penske	1992–1993, 1995, 2003, 2014, 2020, 2026
6	Richard Childress Racing	1987, 1990, 2006, 2011, 2024–2025
5	Bud Moore Engineering	1961–1962, 1979–1981
5	Hendrick Motorsports	1986, 1994, 2000, 2007–2008
5	RFK Racing	1998, 2002, 2005, 2013, 2023
4	DiGard Motorsports	1975, 1978, 1982–1983
3	Cotton Owens	1964–1966
3	Junior Johnson & Associates	1976, 1984–1985
3	Robert Yates Racing	1996–1997, 2001

===== Multiple Winners (Manufacturers) =====
# Wins	Manufacturer	Years won
19	Chevrolet	1958, 1975–1976, 1978, 1982, 1984–1987, 1990, 1994, 2000, 2006–2008, 2011, 2017, 2024–2025
19	Ford	1960, 1963, 1979–1981, 1988, 1995–1998, 2001–2002, 2005, 2013–2014, 2020, 2022–2023, 2026
9	Dodge	1964–1966, 1969, 1973–1974, 1977, 2003–2004
8	Toyota	2009–2010, 2012, 2015–2016, 2018–2019, 2021
6	Pontiac	1961–1962, 1989, 1992–1993, 1999
5	Plymouth	1967–1968, 1970–1972

== Former race ==
Toyota Owners 400
- Corporate sponsor: Toyota
- First race: 1953
- Last race: 2024
- Distance: 300 miles (480 km)
- Laps: 400; Stage 1: 80; Stage 2: 155; Final stage: 165
- Previous names: Richmond 200 (1953, 1955–1957, 1960–1961); Richmond 100 (1959); Richmond 250 (1962–1968); Richmond 500 (1969–1975); Richmond 400 (1976–1983); Miller High Life 400 (1984–1987); Pontiac Excitement 400 (1988–2003); Chevy American Revolution 400 (2004–2005); Crown Royal 400 (2006); Crown Royal presents the Your Name Here 400 (2007–2011); Capital City 400 presented by Virginia is for Lovers (2012)
- Most wins (driver): Richard Petty (6)
- Most wins (team): Joe Gibbs Racing (11)
- Most wins (manufacturer): Chevrolet (23)

The Toyota Owners 400 was a 400 lap NASCAR Cup Series stock car race held at the Richmond Raceway in Richmond, Virginia. From 2007 to 2011, former race title sponsor Crown Royal named the race after the winner of an essay contest during Daytona Speedweeks. The winner of the first essay contest was Jim Stewart from Houma, Louisiana, with subsequent contests won by Dan Lowry of Columbiana, Ohio, and Russ Friedman of Huntington, New York, with the 2010 race being named for Army veteran Heath Calhoun of Clarksville, Tennessee. Since 2010 only military service members have been eligible to win the contest. Crown Royal moved the "Your Name Here" sponsorship to the Brickyard 400 beginning in 2012.

For several years, the race was held as a Sunday afternoon event the weekend after the Daytona 500 in February. Lights were installed at the facility in 1991, but the spring race remained during the daytime. Consistent cold weather plagued the event, and in 1989 a snowstorm blanketed the track, forcing a month-long postponement. This prompted track officials to move the race to later in the spring. By the late-1990s, the race was moved to May or June and eventually shifted to Saturday night under-the-lights. Starting in 2012, the race was held on the last Saturday in April, after the race switched dates with the spring Talladega race. The race returned to Sunday afternoon in 2016 but returned to Saturday night in 2018. The 2020 race was not held due to the COVID-19 pandemic, being replaced with a race at Darlington Raceway. The race was removed from the schedule following 2024, as a race will be held at Mexico City.

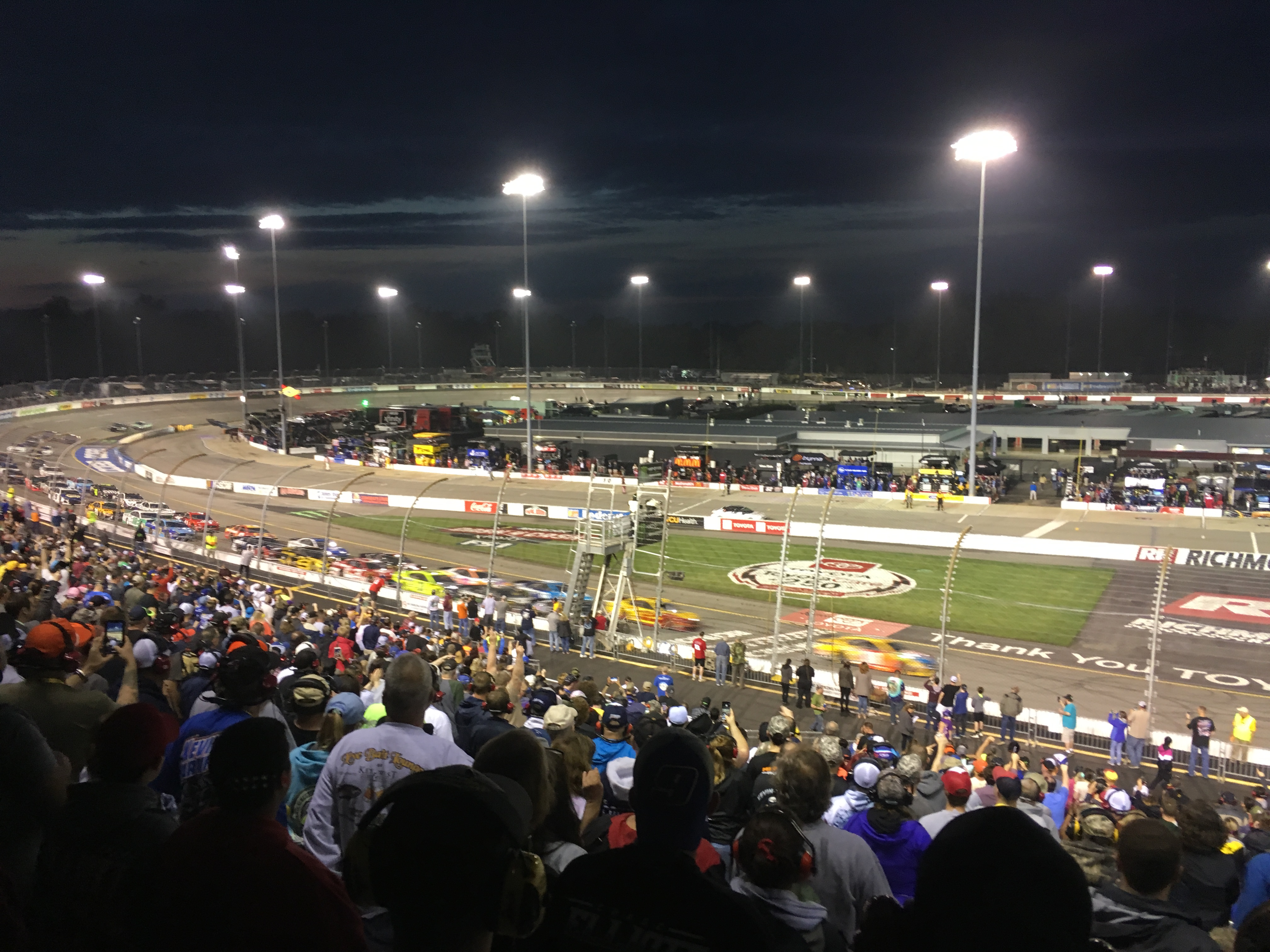
2019 Toyota Owners 400, won by Martin Truex Jr.

Denny Hamlin is the final winner of the race.

=== Past winners ===
Year	Date	No.	Driver	Team	Manufacturer	Race Distance		Race Time	Average Speed (mph)	Report	Ref
Year	Date	No.	Driver	Team	Manufacturer	Laps	Miles (km)	Race Time	Average Speed (mph)	Report	Ref
1953	April 19	42	Lee Petty	Petty Enterprises	Dodge	200	100 (160.934)	2:11:48	45.535	Report	
1954	Not held										
1955	May 22	300	Tim Flock	Carl Kiekhaefer	Chrysler	200	100 (160.934)	1:50:30	54.298	Report	
1956	April 29	87	Buck Baker	Carl Kiekhaefer	Dodge	200	100 (160.934)	1:46:42	56.232	Report	
1957	May 5	12	Paul Goldsmith	Pete DePaolo	Ford	200	100 (160.934)	1:36:05	62.445	Report	
1958	Not held										
1959	June 21	59	Tom Pistone	Carl Rupert	T-Bird	200	100 (160.934)	1:45:29	56.881	Report	
1960	June 5	42	Lee Petty	Petty Enterprises	Plymouth	200	100 (160.934)	1:36:23	62.251	Report	
1961	April 23	43	Richard Petty	Petty Enterprises	Plymouth	200	100 (160.934)	1:36:04	62.456	Report	
1962	April 1	4	Rex White	Rex White	Chevrolet	180*	90 (144.84)	1:45:08	51.363	Report	
1963	April 7	8	Joe Weatherly	Bud Moore Engineering	Pontiac	250	125 (201.168)	2:06:16	58.624	Report	
1964	March 10	6	David Pearson	Cotton Owens	Dodge	250	125 (201.168)	2:07:51	60.233	Report	
1965	March 7	26	Junior Johnson	Junior Johnson & Associates	Ford	250	125 (201.168)	2:02:07	61.416	Report	
1966	May 15	6	David Pearson	Cotton Owens	Dodge	250	125 (201.168)	1:52:43	66.539	Report	
1967	April 30	43	Richard Petty	Petty Enterprises	Plymouth	250	125 (201.168)	1:53:40	65.982	Report	
1968	March 24	17	David Pearson	Holman-Moody	Ford	250	125 (201.168)	1:55:55	65.217	Report	
1969	April 13	17	David Pearson	Holman-Moody	Ford	500	250 (402.336)	3:23:23	73.752	Report	
1970	March 1	48	James Hylton	James Hylton	Ford	500	271 (436.132)	3:18:11	82.044	Report	
1971	March 7	43	Richard Petty	Petty Enterprises	Plymouth	500	271 (436.132)	3:23:20	79.836	Report	
1972	Feb 27	43	Richard Petty	Petty Enterprises	Plymouth	500	271 (436.132)	3:32:12	76.258	Report	
1973	Feb 25	43	Richard Petty	Petty Enterprises	Dodge	500	271 (436.132)	3:37:29	74.764	Report	
1974	Feb 24	12	Bobby Allison	Bobby Allison	Chevrolet	450*	243.9 (392.519)	3:02:02	80.095	Report	
1975	Feb 23	43	Richard Petty	Petty Enterprises	Dodge	500	271 (436.132)	3:37:03	74.913	Report	
1976	March 7	71	Dave Marcis	Nord Krauskopf	Dodge	400	216.8 (348.905)	2:58:44	72.792	Report	
1977	Feb 27	11	Cale Yarborough	Junior Johnson & Associates	Chevrolet	245*	132.79 (213.704)	1:49:01	73.084	Report	
1978	Feb 26	72	Benny Parsons	L.G. DeWitt	Chevrolet	400	216.8 (348.905)	2:41:59	80.304	Report	
1979	March 11	11	Cale Yarborough	Junior Johnson & Associates	Oldsmobile	400	216.8 (348.905)	2:35:34	83.608	Report	
1980	Feb 24	88	Darrell Waltrip	DiGard Motorsports	Chevrolet	400	216.8 (348.905)	3:12:08	67.703	Report	
1981	Feb 22	11	Darrell Waltrip	Junior Johnson & Associates	Buick	400	216.8 (348.905)	2:49:53	76.57	Report	
1982	Feb 21	71	Dave Marcis	Dave Marcis	Chevrolet	250*	135.5 (218.066)	1:51:30	72.914	Report	
1983	Feb 27	22	Bobby Allison	DiGard Motorsports	Chevrolet	400	216.8 (348.905)	2:43:45	79.584	Report	
1984	Feb 26	15	Ricky Rudd	Bud Moore Engineering	Ford	400	216.8 (348.905)	2:09:31	76.736	Report	
1985	Feb 24	3	Dale Earnhardt	Richard Childress Racing	Chevrolet	400	216.8 (348.905)	3:11:27	67.945	Report	
1986*	Feb 23	7	Kyle Petty	Wood Brothers Racing	Ford	400	216.8 (348.905)	3:02:54	71.078	Report	
1987	March 8	3	Dale Earnhardt	Richard Childress Racing	Chevrolet	400	216.8 (348.905)	2:39:34	81.52	Report	
1988*	Feb 21	75	Neil Bonnett	RahMoc Enterprises	Pontiac	400	216.8 (348.905)	3:15:54	66.401	Report	
1989	Mar 26*	27	Rusty Wallace	Blue Max Racing	Pontiac	400	300 (482.803)	3:20:51	89.619	Report	
1990	Feb 25	6	Mark Martin	Roush Racing	Ford	400	300 (482.803)	3:15:18	92.158	Report	
1991	Feb 24	3	Dale Earnhardt	Richard Childress Racing	Chevrolet	400	300 (482.803)	2:50:47	105.937	Report	
1992	March 8	11	Bill Elliott	Junior Johnson & Associates	Ford	400	300 (482.803)	2:52:27	104.378	Report	
1993	March 7	28	Davey Allison	Robert Yates Racing	Ford	400	300 (482.803)	2:47:07	107.709	Report	
1994	March 6	28	Ernie Irvan	Robert Yates Racing	Ford	400	300 (482.803)	3:03:03	98.334	Report	
1995	March 5	5	Terry Labonte	Hendrick Motorsports	Chevrolet	400	300 (482.803)	2:49:08	106.425	Report	
1996	March 3	24	Jeff Gordon	Hendrick Motorsports	Chevrolet	400	300 (482.803)	2:55:11	102.75	Report	
1997	March 2	2	Rusty Wallace	Penske Racing	Ford	400	300 (482.803)	2:45:54	108.499	Report	
1998*	June 6	5	Terry Labonte	Hendrick Motorsports	Chevrolet	400	300 (482.803)	3:05:29	97.044	Report	
1999	May 15	88	Dale Jarrett	Robert Yates Racing	Ford	400	300 (482.803)	2:59:49	100.102	Report	
2000	May 6	8	Dale Earnhardt Jr.	Dale Earnhardt, Inc.	Chevrolet	400	300 (482.803)	3:01:08	99.374	Report	
2001	May 5	20	Tony Stewart	Joe Gibbs Racing	Pontiac	400	300 (482.803)	3:07:45	95.872	Report	
2002	May 4/5*	20	Tony Stewart	Joe Gibbs Racing	Pontiac	400	300 (482.803)	3:27:19	86.824	Report	
2003	May 3	25	Joe Nemechek	Hendrick Motorsports	Chevrolet	393*	294.75 (474.354)	3:23:47	86.783	Report	
2004	May 15	8	Dale Earnhardt Jr.	Dale Earnhardt, Inc.	Chevrolet	400	300 (482.803)	3:03:12	98.253	Report	
2005	May 14	9	Kasey Kahne	Evernham Motorsports	Dodge	400	300 (482.803)	2:59:26	100.316	Report	
2006	May 6	8	Dale Earnhardt Jr.	Dale Earnhardt, Inc.	Chevrolet	400	300 (482.803)	3:05:27	97.061	Report	
2007	May 6*	48	Jimmie Johnson	Hendrick Motorsports	Chevrolet	400	300 (482.803)	3:17:53	91.27	Report	
2008	May 3	07	Clint Bowyer	Richard Childress Racing	Chevrolet	410*	307.5 (494.873)	3:12:37	95.786	Report	
2009	May 2	18	Kyle Busch*	Joe Gibbs Racing	Toyota	400	300 (482.803)	3:18:37	90.627	Report	
2010	May 1	18	Kyle Busch	Joe Gibbs Racing	Toyota	400	300 (482.803)	3:00:47	99.567	Report	
2011	April 30	18	Kyle Busch	Joe Gibbs Racing	Toyota	400	300 (482.803)	3:08:55	95.28	Report	
2012	April 28	18	Kyle Busch	Joe Gibbs Racing	Toyota	400	300 (482.803)	2:51:06	105.202	Report	
2013	April 27	29	Kevin Harvick	Richard Childress Racing	Chevrolet	406*	304.5 (490.045)	3:18:17	92.141	Report	
2014	April 26	22	Joey Logano	Team Penske	Ford	400	300 (482.803)	3:20:47	91.369	Report	
2015	April 26*	41	Kurt Busch	Stewart–Haas Racing	Chevrolet	400	300 (482.803)	3:05:16	97.157	Report	
2016	April 24	19	Carl Edwards	Joe Gibbs Racing	Toyota	400	300 (482.803)	3:05:26	97.07	Report	
2017	April 30	22	Joey Logano	Team Penske	Ford	400	300 (482.803)	3:12:08	93.685	Report	
2018	April 21	18	Kyle Busch	Joe Gibbs Racing	Toyota	402*	301.5 (485.217)	3:08:01	96.215	Report	
2019	April 13	19	Martin Truex Jr.	Joe Gibbs Racing	Toyota	400	300 (482.803)	3:00:16	99.852	Report	
2020	Moved to Darlington because of the COVID-19 pandemic.										
2021	April 18	48	Alex Bowman	Hendrick Motorsports	Chevrolet	400	300 (482.803)	3:06:57	96.282	Report	
2022	April 3	11	Denny Hamlin	Joe Gibbs Racing	Toyota	400	300 (482.803)	3:04:43	97.447	Report	
2023	April 2	5	Kyle Larson	Hendrick Motorsports	Chevrolet	400	300 (482.803)	3:17:37	91.085	Report	
2024	March 31	11	Denny Hamlin	Joe Gibbs Racing	Toyota	407*	305.25 (491.252)	3:14:41	94.076	Report	

- 1962: Race shortened due to darkness.
- 1974: Race shortened due to the energy crisis.
- 1977, 1982, and 2003: Race shortened due to rain.
- 1989: Race rescheduled one month later due to snow.
- 2002: Race started on Saturday night but was finished on Sunday afternoon due to rain.
- 2007 and 2015: Race postponed from Saturday night to Sunday afternoon due to rain.
- 2008, 2013, 2018, and 2024: Race extended due to a NASCAR Overtime finish.
- 2020: Race moved to Darlington due to the COVID-19 pandemic.

==== Multiple winners (drivers) ====
Wins	Driver	Years won
6	Richard Petty	1961, 1967, 1971–1973, 1975
5	Kyle Busch	2009–2012, 2018
4	David Pearson	1964, 1966, 1968–1969
3	Dale Earnhardt	1985, 1987, 1991
3	Dale Earnhardt Jr.	2000, 2004, 2006
2	Lee Petty	1953, 1960
2	Cale Yarborough	1977, 1979
2	Darrell Waltrip	1980–1981
2	Dave Marcis	1976, 1982
2	Bobby Allison	1974, 1983
2	Rusty Wallace	1989, 1997
2	Terry Labonte	1995, 1998
2	Tony Stewart	2001–2002
2	Joey Logano	2014, 2017
2	Denny Hamlin	2022, 2024

==== Multiple winners (teams) ====
Wins	Driver	Years won
11	Joe Gibbs Racing	2001–2002, 2009–2012, 2016, 2018–2019, 2022, 2024
8	Petty Enterprises	1953, 1960–1961, 1967, 1971–1973, 1975
7	Hendrick Motorsports	1995–1996, 1998, 2003, 2007, 2021, 2023
5	Junior Johnson & Associates	1965, 1977, 1979, 1981, 1992
5	Richard Childress Racing	1985, 1987, 1991, 2008, 2013
3	Robert Yates Racing	1993–1994, 1999
3	Dale Earnhardt, Inc.	2000, 2004, 2006
3	Team Penske	1997, 2014, 2017
2	Carl Kiekhaefer	1955–1956
2	Bud Moore Engineering	1963, 1984
2	Cotton Owens	1964, 1966
2	Holman-Moody	1968–1969
2	DiGard Motorsports	1980, 1983

==== Manufacturers wins ====
Wins	Manufacturer	Years won
23	Chevrolet	1962, 1974, 1977–1978, 1980, 1982–1983, 1985, 1987, 1991, 1995–1996, 1998, 2000, 2003–2004, 2006–2008, 2013, 2015, 2021, 2023
15	Ford	1957, 1965, 1968–1970, 1984, 1986, 1990, 1992–1994, 1997, 1999, 2014, 2017
9	Toyota	2009–2012, 2016, 2018–2019, 2022, 2024
8	Dodge	1953, 1956, 1964, 1966, 1973, 1975–1976, 2005
5	Plymouth	1960–1961, 1967, 1971–1972
5	Pontiac	1963, 1988–1989, 2001–2002
1	Chrysler	1955
1	T-Bird	1959
1	Buick	1981

Previous race: Cook Out Southern 500	NASCAR Cup Series; Cook Out 400	Next race: Busch Light at The Glen
