= 1959 Hickory 250 =

Auto race held at Hickory Speedway in 1959

Race details
- Race 12 of 44 in the 1959 NASCAR Grand National Series season
- Date: May 2, 1959
- Official name: Hickory 250
- Location: Hickory Speedway, Hickory, North Carolina
- Course: Permanent racing facility
- Course length: 0.644 km (0.400 miles)
- Distance: 250 laps, 100 mi (160 km)
- Weather: Very hot with temperatures of 90 °F (32 °C); wind speeds of 10.1 miles per hour (16.3 km/h)
- Average speed: 62.165 miles per hour (100.045 km/h)
- Attendance: 5,000

Pole position
| Driver | Junior Johnson | Paul Spalding |

Most laps led
| Driver | Speedy Thompson | Steve Pierce |
- Laps: 138

Winner
| No. 71 | Junior Johnson | Paul Spalding |

The 1959 Hickory 250 was a NASCAR Grand National Series event that was held on May 2, 1959, at Hickory Speedway in Hickory, North Carolina.

Harlan Richardson would make his grand debut into the NASCAR Cup Series during this event.

== Background ==
Hickory Motor Speedway is a short track located in Hickory, North Carolina. It is one of stock car racing's most storied venues, and is often referred to as the "World's Most Famous Short Track" and the "Birthplace of the NASCAR Stars".

The track first opened in 1951 as a 1/2-mile (0.80 km) dirt track. Gwyn Staley won the first race at the speedway and later became the first track champion. Drivers such as Junior Johnson, Ned Jarrett, and Ralph Earnhardt also became track champions in the 1950s, with Earnhardt winning five of them.

In 1953, NASCAR's Grand National Series visited the track for the first time. Tim Flock won the first race at the speedway, which became a regular part of the Grand National schedule. After winning his track championship in 1952, Junior Johnson became the most successful Grand National driver at Hickory, winning there seven times.

The track has been re-configured three times in its history. The track became a 0.4-mile (644 meters) dirt track in 1955, which was paved for the first time during the 1967 season.

== Race report ==
There were 21 drivers who were on the starting grid for this 250-lap racing event. Drivers who were on the lead lap were Junior Johnson, Speedy Thompson, Joe Weatherly, and Buck Baker. Eleven drivers were knocked out of the race due to various vehicle-related problems; Rex White was credited with the last-place finish due to troubles with his transmission on lap 27. All of the drivers were born in the United States of America. Only four cautions slowed the race for an undetermined number of laps. Five thousand people eventually got to see Junior Johnson defeat Joe Weatherly by two and a half laps.

The average speed of all the stock cars in this event was 62.195 miles per hour or 100.093 kilometres per hour; closer to the pole position speed of 68.9 miles per hour or 110.9 kilometres per hour set by Junior Johnson than in today's NASCAR competitions. The entire race was done on a dirt track. Delta Auto Sales was the only "corporate" sponsor for the drivers in this event. Model years for the vehicles ranged from 1957 to 1959. Most of the field were driving Chevrolet stock cars.

The time it took the race to go from the first green flag to the checkered flag was one hour and thirty-six minutes. Individual prize winnings for each driver ranged from the winner's share of $800 ($8,629.22 when adjusted for inflation) to the last-place finishers' share of $50 ($539.33 when adjusted for inflation). The entire prize purse for this event added up to $3,375 ($36,404.54 when adjusted for inflation).

=== Qualifying ===
| Grid | No. | Driver | Manufacturer | Owner |
|---|---|---|---|---|
| 1 | 11 | Junior Johnson | '57 Ford | Paul Spalding |
| 2 | 42 | Lee Petty | '57 Oldsmobile | Petty Enterprises |
| 3 | 40 | Ken Rush | '57 Chevrolet | Paul Walton |
| 4 | 34 | G.C. Spencer | '57 Chevrolet | G.C. Spencer |
| 5 | 5 | Rex White | '57 Chevrolet | Tiny Lund |
| 6 | 7 | Jim Reed | '57 Ford | Jim Reed |
| 7 | 41 | Joe Weatherly | '59 Ford T-Bird | Doc White |
| 8 | 38 | Ned Jarrett | '57 Chevrolet | Ned Jarrett |
| 9 | 69 | Shep Langdon | '58 Ford | Shep Langdon |
| 10 | 45 | Bobby Waddell | '57 Pontiac | Bobby Waddell |
| 11 | 6 | Cotton Owens | '58 Pontiac | W.H. Watson |
| 12 | 22 | Harlan Richardson | '58 Ford | Harlan Richardson |
| 13 | 27 | Jimmy Pardue | '58 Plymouth | Jimmy Pardue |
| 14 | 96 | Bobby Keck | '57 Chevrolet | Bobby Keck |
| 15 | 81 | Harvey Hege | '57 Ford | Harvey Hege |
| 16 | 74 | L.D. Austin | '57 Chevrolet | L.D. Austin |
| 17 | 1 | Speedy Thompson | '57 Chevrolet | Steve Pierce |
| 18 | 87 | Buck Baker | '59 Chevrolet | Buck Baker |
| 19 | 39 | Buck Brigance | '57 Chevrolet | unknown |
| 20 | 19 | Herman Beam | '57 Chevrolet | Herman Beam |
| 21 | 0 | Bunk Moore | '57 Chevrolet | Richard Riley |

== Finishing order ==
Section reference:

1. Junior Johnson (No. 11)
2. Joe Weatherly (No. 41)
3. Lee Petty (No. 42)
4. Ken Rush (No. 40)
5. Cotton Owens (No. 6)
6. Speedy Thompson* (No. 1)
7. Shep Langdon (No. 64)
8. L.D. Austin (No. 74)
9. Ned Jarrett (No. 38)
10. Herman Beam (No. 19)
11. Harvey Hege (No. 81)
12. Harlan Richardson* (No. 22)
13. Jim Reed* (No. 7)
14. G.C. Spencer* (No. 34)
15. Buck Baker* (No. 87)
16. Bobby Keck* (No. 96)
17. Buck Brigance* (No. 39)
18. Bobby Waddell* (No. 45)
19. Jimmy Pardue* (No. 27)
20. Bunk Moore* (No. 0)
21. Rex White* (No. 5)

* Driver failed to finish race

== Timeline ==
Section reference:

- Start of race: Junior Johnson started with the pole position.
- Lap 26: Speedy Thompson took over the lead from Junior Johnson.
- Lap 27: Transmission problems would knock Rex White into a last-place finish.
- Lap 28: Bunk Moore's racing weekend would end due to engine failure.
- Lap 51: Joe Weatherly took over the lead from Speedy Thompson.
- Lap 81: Bobby Waddell's piston would stop working properly, ending his racing weekend.
- Lap 101: Buck Baker took over the lead from Joe Weatherly.
- Lap 125: Speedy Thompson took over the lead from Buck Baker.
- Lap 133: The fan on Bobby Keck's vehicle stopped working, forcing him to withdraw from the race.
- Lap 167: Buck Baker had oil pressure issues that would prevent him from winning the race.
- Lap 179: The transmission on G.C. Spencer's vehicle stopped working, ending his race weekend.
- Lap 238: Junior Johnson took over the lead from Speedy Thompson.
- Finish: Junior Johnson wins the race.

| Preceded by 1959 untitled race at Reading Fairgrounds | NASCAR Grand National Season; 1959 | Succeeded by 1959 Virginia 500 |

| Preceded by none | Hickory 250 races 1959 | Succeeded by 1960 |
