= David Terrell =

David Terrell may refer to:

- David Terrell (wide receiver) (born 1979), former NFL wide receiver
- David Terrell (safety) (born 1975), former NFL safety
- David Terrell (fighter) (born 1978), mixed martial arts fighter

== See also ==
- Dave Terrell (born 1931), racing driver
