= Pete Stewart (racer) =

American racing driver (1931–2013)

- Born: August 12, 1931; Statesville, North Carolina, U.S.
- Died: June 26, 2013 (aged 81); Statesville, North Carolina, U.S.

NASCAR Cup Series career
- 17 races run over 7 years
- Best finish: 51st - 1964 NASCAR Grand National season
- First race: 1953 Wilkes 160 (North Wilkesboro Speedway)
- Last race: 1965 Daytona 500 (Daytona International Speedway)
Wins	Top tens	Poles
0	0	0

Pete Stewart (August 12, 1931 – June 26, 2013) was an American NASCAR Grand National Series driver who participated in 17 races from 1953 to 1965.

== Career ==
While never winning a race, Stewart managed to complete 1,412.0 miles (2,272.4 km) of demanding pavement and dirt track racing. On average, Stewart started in 26th place and ended in 23rd place. His modest racing career left him with only a total career earnings of $3,940 ($40,252.9 when adjusted for inflation).

Stewart would see his best finishes on dirt tracks; where he would finish an average of 19th place. However, Stewart's Achilles heel came on tri-oval intermediate tracks where a meager 28th place would have been considered par for the course.

The primary vehicle for Stewart would have been the No. 53 Ford owned by David Warren. Warren also participated in the NASCAR Convertible Series and the NASCAR Modified series in a select number of races.

== Death ==
Stewart died in Statesville, North Carolina on June 26, 2013, at the age of 81.
