= 1959 Firecracker 250 =

Auto race run in Florida in 1959

Race details
- Race 26 of 44 in the 1959 NASCAR Grand National Series season
- 1959 Firecracker 250 program cover
- Date: July 4, 1959
- Location: Daytona International Speedway, Daytona Beach, Florida
- Course: Permanent racing facility
- Course length: 2.5 miles (4.02 km)
- Distance: 100 laps, 250 mi (402.336 km)
- Weather: Very hot with temperatures of 86 °F (30 °C); wind speeds of 13 miles per hour (21 km/h)
- Average speed: 140.581 miles per hour (226.243 km/h)
- Attendance: 12,900

Pole position
Driver	Fireball Roberts	Jim Stephens
- Time: 144.997 miles per hour (233.350 km/h)

Most laps led
Driver	Fireball Roberts	Jim Stephens
- Laps: 82

Winner
No. 3	Fireball Roberts	Jim Stephens

The 1959 Firecracker 250 was a NASCAR Grand National Series event that was held on July 4, 1959, at Daytona International Speedway in Daytona Beach, Florida.

== Summary ==
Contested over 100 laps it was the twenty-sixth race of the 1959 NASCAR Grand National Series season. Fireball Roberts, driving for Jim Stephens, took his first win of the season, while Joe Weatherly finished second and Johnny Allen finished third.

=== Results ===
Pos	Grid	Car	Driver	Owner	Car	Laps finished	Lap led
1	1	3	Fireball Roberts	Jim Stephens	1959 Pontiac	100	82
2	12	12	Joe Weatherly	Doc White	1959 Thunderbird	100	8
3	11	22	Johnny Allen	W.J. Ridgeway	1959 Chevrolet	99	0
4	5	47	Jack Smith	Jack Smith	1959 Chevrolet	99	1
5	3	37	Eduardo Dibos	Van Acker	1959 Thunderbird	98	0
6	2	73	Bob Burdick	Roy Burdick	1959 Thunderbird	97	0
7	13	59	Tom Pistone	Carl Rupert	1959 Thunderbird	96	7
8	21	6	Cotton Owens	W.H. Watson	1959 Thunderbird	95	0
9	14	36	Tommy Irwin	Tommy Irwin	1959 Thunderbird	95	0
10	7	7	Jim Reed	Jim Reed	1959 Chevrolet	95	0
11	17	41	Speedy Thompson	Doc White	1959 Thunderbird	94	0
12	6	44	Gene White		1959 Chevrolet	92	0
13	18	20	Benny Rakestraw	Spook Crawford	1957 Mercury	92	0
14	16	92	George Alsobrook	Joe Jones	1957 Ford	92	0
15	29	13	Tommy Thompson	Tommy Thompson	1959 Chevrolet	90	0
16	34	83	Shorty Rollins	A.J. Blackwelder	1958 Ford	90	0
17	22	76	Larry Frank	Larry Frank	1957 Chevrolet	89	0
18	37	19	Herman Beam	Herman Beam	1957 Chevrolet	89	0
19	20	77	Joe Lee Johnson	Joe Lee Johnson	1957 Chevrolet	88	0
20	24	14	Ken Rush	Manley Britt	1958 Ford	88	0
21	31	71	Dick Joslin	Dick Joslin	1957 Dodge	87	0
22	10	99	Wilbur Rakestraw	Talmadge Cochrane	1957 Mercury	87	0
23	23	4	Rex White	Rex White	1959 Chevrolet	86	0
24	33	86	Larry Flynn	Larry Flynn	1957 Ford	85	0
25	32	89	Roy Tyner	Roy Tyner	1958 Chevrolet	84	0
26	4	43	Richard Petty	Petty Enterprises	1959 Plymouth	78	0
27	27	49	Bob Welborn	Bob Welborn	1959 Chevrolet	77	0
28	26	32	George Green	Jess Potter	1958 Chevrolet	73	0
29	15	16	Charlie Cregar	Happy Steigel	1959 Pontiac	70	0
30	9	60	John Paschall		1958 Ford	67	0
31	35	66	Dick Foley	Dick Foley	1959 Chevrolet	60	0
32	36	97	Jim Austin	Jim Austin	1959 Ford	33	0
33	19	42	Lee Petty	Petty Enterprises	1959 Plymouth	27	0
34	30	34	G.C. Spencer	G.C. Spencer	1957 Chevrolet	16	0
35	25	87	Buck Baker	Buck Baker	1959 Chevrolet	12	0
36	8	10	Elmo Langley	Ratus Walters	1959 Buick	11	0
37	28	82	Joe Eubanks	Don Every	1958 Pontiac	2	0

== Timeline ==
Section reference:

- Start: Fireball Roberts had the pole position to start the race with.
- Lap 3: Joe Weatherly took over the lead from Fireball Roberts.
- Lap 4: Jack Smith took over the lead from Joe Weatherly.
- Lap 5: Fireball Roberts took over the lead from Jack Smith.
- Lap 11: Elmo Langley's engine suddenly stopped working.
- Lap 16: G.C. Spencer's engine suddenly stopped working.
- Lap 27: Lee Petty's fuel pump suddenly stopped working.
- Lap 33: Jim Austin's water pump suddenly stopped working.
- Lap 42: Tom Pistone took over the lead from Fireball Roberts.
- Lap 49: Fireball Roberts took over the lead from Tom Pistone.
- Lap 60: Timing issues managed to knock Dick Foley out of the race.
- Lap 70: Charlie Cregar's engine suddenly stopped working.
- Lap 73: George Green's vehicle developed a problematic fan; forcing him out of the race.
- Lap 78: Joe Weatherly took over the lead from Fireball Roberts.
- Lap 85: Fireball Roberts took over the lead from Joe Weatherly.
- Lap 87: Dick Joslin's vehicle developed an oil leak that knocked him out of the race.
- Lap 89: Larry Frank was officially disqualified from the race.
- Finish: Fireball Roberts was officially declared the winner of the event.
