= 1961 Wilkes 200 =

Auto race run in North Carolina in 1961

Race details
- Race 48 of 52 in the 1961 NASCAR Grand National Series season
- The 1961 Wilkes 200 program cover.
- Date: October 1, 1961
- Official name: Wilkes 200
- Location: North Wilkesboro Speedway, North Wilkesboro, North Carolina
- Course: Permanent racing facility
- Course length: 0.625 miles (1.005 km)
- Distance: 320 laps, 200 mi (250 km)
- Weather: Mild with temperatures reaching up to 77 °F (25 °C); winds speeds approaching 13 miles per hour (21 km/h)
- Average speed: 84.675 miles per hour (136.271 km/h)

Pole position
Driver	Junior Johnson	Rex Lovette
- Time: 23.800

Most laps led
Driver	Rex White	Rex White
- Laps: 201

Winner
No. 4	Rex White	Rex White

Television in the United States
- Network: untelevised
- Announcers: none

The 1961 Wilkes 200 was a NASCAR Grand National Series event that was held on October 1, 1961, at North Wilkesboro Speedway in North Wilkesboro, North Carolina.

The layout of North Wilkesboro Speedway, the venue where the race was held.

== Background ==
Through the 1960s and 1970s the NASCAR Grand National Series began focusing on bigger, faster, and longer tracks. Like other short tracks in NASCAR at the time, crowd capacity and purses were small compared to the larger tracks. Over time, Enoch Staley and Jack Combs attempted to keep the facility modern and on pace with the growth of the sport. The West Grandstand was rebuilt with chair-type seats rather than the old bare concrete slabs. New larger restroom facilities were built, and the South Grandstand was expanded. A garage facility was also built within the track, which at the time was rare for short-track venues. But the main focus was on keeping ticket prices affordable. Food and beverage prices were kept low, and event parking and camping were always free. As long as profits covered maintenance costs, Staley was satisfied with the income of the track.

In the Gwyn Staley 160 of 1960, Junior Johnson beat 21 other drivers for the pole position with a lap speed of 83.860 mph. Glen Wood overtook Johnson to lead the first lap, but Johnson had the race under control and led the next 145 laps. Lee Petty moved up from the eighth starting position to challenge Johnson late in the race. With 14 laps remaining, Johnson and Petty made contact. Johnson's car was sent spinning into the guardrail. Petty led the final 14 laps to win his third straight race at North Wilkesboro. The crowd of 9,200 pelted Petty with bottles, rocks, and debris after his win; he had done their local hero wrong. When Petty took the microphone in Victory Lane to explain his side of the story, the crowd began jeering. Rex White finished second, and Wood placed third. Ned Jarrett finished fourth under the alias John Lentz.

The length of the fall race in 1960 was increased from its usual 160 laps / 100 miles to 320 laps / 200 miles, this it became known as the Wilkes 320. Speeds increased immensely from the previous record, 1.83 seconds quicker than any previous qualifying lap (86.806 to 93.399 mph). Rex White posted the fastest qualifying lap and dethroned Lee Petty from his three-race winning streak at North Wilkesboro. Junior Johnson finished about half a lap behind White in second place.

== Summary ==
The race took two hours and twenty-two minutes in order to resolve 320 laps in front of 9000 live audience members; with a track spanning 0.625 miles (1.006 km) for 200 miles (320 km) of racing action. Four cautions slowed the race for 24 laps. The average speed of the race was 84.675 miles per hour (136.271 km/h) while the pole position speed was established by Junior Johnson who qualified with a speed of 94.540 miles per hour (152.147 km/h). Rex White managed to defeat Fireball Roberts by at least one lap. Joe Jones was the last-place finisher of the race. The other finishers in the top ten were: Richard Petty, Junior Johnson, Ned Jarrett, Emanuel Zervakis, Jimmy Pardue, Joe Weatherly, Bill Morton, and Doug Yates.

Most of the drivers on this 30-car grid were driving cars belonging to the Chevrolet (13) and Pontiac (7) manufacturers (with Ford (4), Dodge and Plymouth (2 each) and Mercury (1) making up the rest of the field ). All the drivers who qualified for the race were American-born males; there were no foreigners or women in this racing event. Banjo Matthews would never race at Wilkes Motor Speedway again after this race.

Bud Allman was the only notable crew chief to attend this race; he serviced Ned Jarret's #11 Chevrolet vehicle.

The transition to purpose-built racecars began in the early 1960s and occurred gradually over that decade. Changes made to the sport by the late 1960s brought an end to the "strictly stock" vehicles of the 1950s.

=== Qualifying ===
Grid	No.	Driver	Manufacturer	Speed	Qualifying time	Owner
1	27	Junior Johnson	'61 Pontiac	94.540	23.800	Rex Lovette
2	21	Banjo Matthews	'61 Ford	94.240	23.870	Wood Brothers
3	4	Rex White	'61 Chevrolet	93.840	23.970	Rex White
4	44	Jim Paschal	'61 Pontiac	93.750	24.000	Julian Petty
5	8	Joe Weatherly	'61 Pontiac	93.340	24.080	Bud Moore
6	18	Fireball Roberts	'61 Pontiac	93.180	24.140	Bud Moore
7	46	Jack Smith	'61 Pontiac	93.150	24.150	Jack Smith
8	2	Tommy Irwin	'61 Chevrolet	93.120	24.180	Tom Daniels
9	86	Buck Baker	'61 Chrysler	92.960	24.210	Buck Baker
10	11	Ned Jarrett	'61 Chevrolet	92.850	24.220	B.G. Holloway

Failed to qualify: Bob Presnell (#5), Fred Lorenzen (#28), Nelson Stacy (#29), Dale Jett (#70)

== Timeline ==
Section reference:

- Start of race: Junior Johnson started the race with the pole position.
- Lap 2: Joe Jones had problems handling his vehicle, forcing him out of the race.
- Lap 8: Ken Rush's engine became problematic.
- Lap 26: Harry Leake engine's developed some major issues, causing him to leave the race.
- Lap 28: Buck Baker would be sidelined for the remainder of the race due to troubles with his engine.
- Lap 80: Joe Weatherly gained the lead from Junior Johnson.
- Lap 81: Junior Johnson managed to regain the lead from Joe Weatherly.
- Lap 120: Rex White gained the lead from Junior Johnson while John Hamby retired from the race due to transmission problems.
- Lap 189: Faulty oil pressure readings forced Cotton Owens to quit racing for the day.
- Lap 190: A faulty piston ended Jack Smith's day on the track.
- Lap 194: G.C. Spencer had a terminal crash, forcing him to retire from the race prematurely.
- Lap 198: Johnny Allen had a terminal crash, causing him to leave the event early.
- Lap 241: Fred Harb's troublesome engine brought his race to a premature end.
- Lap 253: L.D. Austin's overheating vehicle made him leave the race with a somewhat respectable 17th-place finish.
- Lap 296: Tommy Irwin had a terminal crash, allowing him to secure a respectable 11th-place finish in the process.
- Finish: Rex White was officially declared the winner of the event.

Preceded by 1961 Old Dominion 500	NASCAR Grand National Series Season; 1961	Succeeded by 1961 National 400
