= Buckshot Morris =

American NASCAR driver

R. T. "Buckshot" Morris was an American car racer and car owner in the 1940s and 1950s. He employed drivers from 1952 to 1955 in the NASCAR Grand National Series.

== Career ==
Morris also raced in two races as a driver in 1949; starting an average of fifth place and ending an average of 28th place.

Twenty races were done in three years with drivers under his employment. As a result, Morris' vehicles achieved two wins, seven finishes in the "top-five," and eleven finishes in the "top-ten." These notable drivers included: Billy Carden, Jim Paschal, Speedy Thompson, and Joe Weatherly. Morris managed to earn $7,190 in race winnings ($86,413.98 when adjusted for inflation) and lead 99 laps out of 2851. Cars under Morris' ownership started an average of 19th place and finished an average of 12th place after 2,259.7 miles (3,636.6 km) of racing.
