= 1952 Wilkes County 200 =

Auto race held at North Wilkesboro Speedway in 1952

Race details
- Race 4 of 34 in the 1952 NASCAR Grand National Series season
- North Wilkesboro Speedway
- Date: March 30, 1952
- Official name: Delaware 500
- Location: North Wilkesboro Speedway, North Wilkesboro, North Carolina
- Course: Permanent racing facility
- Course length: 1.005 km (0.625 miles)
- Distance: 200 laps, 200.0 mi (321.8 km)
- Weather: Temperatures reaching of 70 °F (21 °C); wind speeds of 10.1 miles per hour (16.3 km/h)
- Average speed: 58.597 miles per hour (94.303 km/h)
- Attendance: 10,000

Pole position
Driver	Herb Thomas	Herb Thomas

Most laps led
Driver	Herb Thomas	Herb Thomas
- Laps: 200

Winner
No. 92	Herb Thomas	Herb Thomas

Television in the United States
- Network: untelevised
- Announcers: none

The 1952 Wilkes County 200 was a NASCAR Grand National Series event that was held on March 30, 1952, at North Wilkesboro Speedway in North Wilkesboro, North Carolina.

The race car drivers still had to commute to the races using the same stock cars that competed in a typical weekend's race through a policy of homologation (and under their own power). This policy was in effect until roughly 1975. By 1980, NASCAR had completely stopped tracking the year model of all the vehicles and most teams did not take stock cars to the track under their own power anymore.

== Race report ==
Due to the lack of precision and accuracy of the NASCAR record keepers of the 1950s, only the most vital information of the race was not thrown away after the racing event was over. Only the first two starting positions, all of the finishing positions, and the racing numbers of the most notable drivers were kept. Dave Terrell would score his first of four top-5 finishes at this race. Herb Thomas would lead the race from green flag to checkered flag while this race become the first of four top 5s finishes for Dave Terrell.

Harold Mays inflicted terminal vehicle damage on lap 1 while Dick Rathman's vehicle had a busted radiator on lap 20. A tie rod became a major problem for Jimmie Lewallen's vehicle on lap 26 along with Tim Flock's gasket. Curtis Turner's vehicle also had problems with its radiator on lap 35 while an accident took Perk Brown out of the race on lap 39. Frankie Schneider's vehicle would be rendered unworthy to race due to a crash on lap 40. A problem with the vehicle's battery forced Bobby Courtright out of the race on lap 47.

Buck Baker would be forced out of the race due to radiator problems on lap 67. Charles Gattalia would overheat his vehicle on lap 69. Braking issues forced Shorty Gibbs out of the race on lap 76 while a missing rear end caused Leonard Tippett to go to the sidelines on lap 108. Joe Eubanks noticed that his vehicle's clutch stopped working on lap 122; forcing him out of the race. Problems with the vehicle's handling took Lee Petty out of the race on lap 142. An over-exhausted battery took Jim Paschal out of the contention on lap 164. The final DNF of the race came when Buddy Shuman noticed that his vehicle's shocks are acting abnormally on lap 175.

Two hundred laps were done on a dirt oval track spanning 0.625 miles (1.006 km); making a grand total of 125 miles (201 km). The race took two hours and eight minutes to reach completion and twenty-four drivers competed. Out of these twenty-four drivers, only seven managed to complete the race. Herb Thomas managed to defeat Fonty Flock in the race by at least one lap in front of ten thousand people. A Hudson Hornet was used in order to win the race.

The pole speed was 75.075 miles per hour (120.822 km/h) while the average speed was 58.597 miles per hour (94.303 km/h). Marshall Teague would run his only race at the North Wilkesboro Speedway; losing his life at a practice session for the 1959 Daytona 500 around seven years later. However, he would only run for 57 laps before withdrawing himself from the race due to reasons unknown.

Julian Buesink, Doug Meeks and B.B. Blackburn were three of the most notable crew chiefs to participate in this event. Total winnings for the race was $3,550 USD ($42,035 when considering inflation).

=== Finishing order ===
1. Herb Thomas† (No. 92)
2. Fonty Flock† (No. 14)
3. Bill Blair† (No. 2)
4. Donald Thomas† (No. 72)
5. Dave Terrell (No. 126)
6. Neil Cole† (No. 53)
7. Buddy Shuman*† (No. 17)
8. Jim Paschal*† (No. 60)
9. Lee Petty*† (No. 42)
10. Otis Martin† (unknown number)
11. Joe Eubanks*† (No. 82)
12. Leonard Tippett*† (No.199)
13. Shorty Gibbs* (unknown number)
14. Charles Gattalia*† (No. 128)
15. Buck Baker*† (No. 89)
16. Marshall Teague*† (No. 6)
17. Bobby Courtwright*† (unknown number)
18. Frankie Schneider*† (No. 88)
19. Perk Brown*† (No. 22)
20. Curtis Turner*† (No. 41)
21. Tim Flock*† (No. 91)
22. Jimmie Lewallen*† (No. 24)
23. Dick Rathmann*† (No. 120)
24. Harold Mays*† (unknown number)

* Driver failed to finish race
† signifies that the driver is known to be deceased
