= 1959 NASCAR Grand National Series =

American motorsport season

Seasons
- ← 1958 1960 →

The 1959 NASCAR Grand National Series was the 11th season of professional stock car racing in the United States. The season, which began on November 9, 1958 in Fayetteville, North Carolina, was contested over 44 races. The season ended at Concord Speedway in Concord, North Carolina, on October 25, 1959. Lee Petty was the drivers' champion, while his son, Richard won the NASCAR Rookie of the Year award. Chevrolet won the Manufacturers' Championship. It was also the last season without NASCAR legend David Pearson until 1987.

== Results ==
D Dirt oval
P Paved oval

No	Date	Track	Track type		Winning driver	Manufacturer	Report
No	Date	Track	Pavement/shape	Length category	Winning driver	Manufacturer	Report
1	November 9	Champion Speedway (Fayetteville, NC)	P paved oval	short track	Bob Welborn	Chevrolet	
2	February 20	Daytona International Speedway (Daytona Beach, FL)	P paved oval	superspeedway	Bob Welborn	Chevrolet	
3	February 22	Daytona International Speedway (Daytona Beach, FL)	P paved oval	superspeedway	Lee Petty	Oldsmobile	Report
4	March 1	Orange Speedway (Hillsborough, NC)	D dirt oval	short track	Curtis Turner	Ford	
5	March 8	Concord Speedway (Midland, NC)	D dirt oval	short track	Curtis Turner	Ford	
6	March 22	Lakewood Speedway (Atlanta, GA)	D dirt oval	intermediate	Johnny Beauchamp	Ford	
7	March 29	Wilson Speedway (Wilson, NC)	D dirt oval	short track	Junior Johnson	Ford	
8	March 30	Bowman Gray Stadium (Winston-Salem, NC)	P paved oval	short track	Jim Reed	Ford	
9	April 4	Columbia Speedway (Cayce, SC)	D dirt oval	short track	Jack Smith	Chevrolet	
10	April 5	North Wilkesboro Speedway (North Wilkesboro, NC)	P paved oval	short track	Lee Petty	Oldsmobile	
11	April 26	Reading Fairgrounds Speedway (Reading, PA)	D dirt oval	short track	Junior Johnson	Ford	
12	May 2	Hickory Speedway (Hickory, NC)	D dirt oval	short track	Junior Johnson	Ford	Report
13	May 3	Martinsville Speedway (Ridgeway, VA)	P paved oval	short track	Lee Petty	Oldsmobile	
14	May 17	Trenton Speedway (Trenton, NJ)	P paved oval	intermediate	Tom Pistone	Ford	
15	May 22	Southern States Fairgrounds (Charlotte, NC)	D dirt oval	short track	Lee Petty	Oldsmobile	
16	May 24	Nashville Speedway (Nashville, TN)	P paved oval	short track	Rex White	Chevrolet	
17	May 30	Ascot Stadium (Los Angeles, CA)	D dirt oval	short track	Parnelli Jones	Ford	
18	June 5	Piedmont Interstate Fairgrounds (Spartanburg, SC)	D dirt oval	short track	Jack Smith	Chevrolet	
19	June 13	Greenville-Pickens Speedway (Easley, SC)	D dirt oval	short track	Junior Johnson	Ford	
20	June 14	Lakewood Speedway (Atlanta, GA)	D dirt oval	intermediate	Lee Petty	Plymouth	
21	June 18	Columbia Speedway (Cayce, SC)	D dirt oval	short track	Lee Petty	Plymouth	
22	June 20	Wilson Speedway (Wilson, NC)	D dirt oval	short track	Junior Johnson	Ford	
23	June 21	Atlantic Rural Fairgrounds (Richmond, VA)	D dirt oval	short track	Tom Pistone	Ford	
24	June 27	Bowman Gray Stadium (Winston-Salem, NC)	P paved oval	short track	Rex White	Chevrolet	
25	June 28	Asheville Weaverville Speedway (Weaverville, NC)	D dirt oval	short track	Rex White	Chevrolet	
26	July 4	Daytona International Speedway (Daytona Beach, FL)	P paved oval	superspeedway	Fireball Roberts	Pontiac	Report
27	July 21	Heidelberg Raceway (Pittsburgh, PA)	D dirt oval	short track	Jim Reed	Chevrolet	
28	July 26	Southern States Fairgrounds (Charlotte, NC)	D dirt oval	short track	Jack Smith	Chevrolet	
29	August 1	Rambi Raceway (Myrtle Beach, SC)	D dirt oval	short track	Ned Jarrett	Ford	
30	August 2	Southern States Fairgrounds (Charlotte, NC)	D dirt oval	short track	Ned Jarrett	Ford	
31	August 9	Nashville Speedway (Nashville, TN)	P paved oval	short track	Joe Lee Johnson	Chevrolet	
32	August 16	Asheville Weaverville Speedway (Weaverville, NC)	D dirt oval	short track	Bob Welborn	Chevrolet	Report
33	August 21	Bowman Gray Stadium (Winston-Salem, NC)	P paved oval	short track	Rex White	Chevrolet	
34	August 22	Greenville-Pickens Speedway (Easley, SC)	D dirt oval	short track	Buck Baker	Chevrolet	
35	August 29	Columbia Speedway (Cayce, SC)	D dirt oval	short track	Lee Petty	Plymouth	
36	September 7	Darlington Raceway (Darlington, SC)	P paved oval	intermediate	Jim Reed	Chevrolet	Report
37	September 11	Hickory Speedway (Hickory, NC)	D dirt oval	short track	Lee Petty	Plymouth	
38	September 13	Atlantic Rural Fairgrounds (Richmond, VA)	D dirt oval	short track	Cotton Owens	Ford	
39	September 13	California State Fairgrounds (Sacramento, CA)	D dirt oval	intermediate	Eddie Gray	Ford	
40	September 20	Orange Speedway (Hillsborough, NC)	D dirt oval	short track	Lee Petty	Plymouth	
41	September 27	Martinsville Speedway (Ridgeway, VA)	P paved oval	short track	Rex White	Chevrolet	
42	October 11	Asheville Weaverville Speedway (Weaverville, NC)	D dirt oval	short track	Lee Petty	Plymouth	
43	October 18	North Wilkesboro Speedway (North Wilkesboro, NC)	P paved oval	short track	Lee Petty	Plymouth	
44	October 25	Concord Speedway (Midland, NC)	D dirt oval	short track	Jack Smith	Chevrolet	
