= Bob Griffin (NASCAR) =

- Born: February 10, 1895
- Died: August 2, 1979 (aged 84)
- Occupation: Team owner
- Years active: 1950–1962
- Employer: Griffin Motors Oldsmobile

Bob Griffin (February 10, 1895 – August 2, 1979) was a NASCAR team owner from 1950 to 1962. As owner of Griffin Motors Racing, along with his sons Tommy and Bobby, he fielded cars in the NASCAR Grand National Series. Drivers such as Buck Baker, Fireball Roberts, Lee Petty, and Fonty Flock at one point raced for Griffin Motors Racing.

Additionally, he was the owner of Griffin Motors Oldsmobile in Florence, South Carolina. The racing team, also based out of Florence, ran Oldsmobile sedans in the newly formed NASCAR series. The dealership's sponsoring of Baker's entry in the 1950 Southern 500 at Darlington Raceway marked the first appearance of sponsorship in a NASCAR event.
