= Marvin Burke =

American racing driver (1918–1994)

- Born: March 15, 1918 Pittsburg, California, U.S.
- Died: February 23, 1994 (aged 75) Richmond, Virginia, U.S.

Awards
- West Coast Stock Car Hall of Fame (2011)

NASCAR Cup Series career
- 1 race run over 1 year
- Best finish: Unknown (1951)
- First race: 1951 Oakland Stadium Race (Oakland Stadium)
- First win: 1951 Oakland Stadium Race (Oakland Stadium)
Wins	Top tens	Poles
1	1	0
Formula One World Championship career
- Team: Kurtis Kraft
- Entries: 1 (0 starts)
- Championships: 0
- Wins: 0
- Podiums: 0
- Career points: 0
- Pole positions: 0
- Fastest laps: 0
- First entry: 1950 Indianapolis 500
- Last entry: 1950 Indianapolis 500

Marvin Burke (March 15, 1918 – February 23, 1994) was an American NASCAR driver from Pittsburg, California. He ran one Grand National Series race in his career, which he won. His starting position in the thirty-two car field in the 1951 race at Oakland is unknown. Burke drove to the front early and led 156 laps en route to his first career victory in his first career start, Burke never raced again in NASCAR. Burke was the fifth driver to win their NASCAR debut, and is the only driver to have won in their only NASCAR Cup Series race.

Burke attempted to qualify for the 1950 Indianapolis 500 but failed to make the grid.

== Motorsports career results ==
=== Complete Formula One World Championship results ===
(key)

Year	Entrant	Chassis	Engine	1	2	3	4	5	6	7	WDC	Points
1950	Ross Page	Kurtis Kraft	Duray L4	GBR	MON	500; DNQ	SUI	BEL	FRA	ITA	NC	0

=== NASCAR ===
(key) (Bold – Pole position awarded by qualifying time. Italics – Pole position earned by points standings or practice time. * – Most laps led.)

==== Grand National Series ====
NASCAR Grand National Series results
Year	Team	No.	Make	1	2	3	4	5	6	7	8	9	10	11	12	13	14	15	16	17	18	19	20	21	22	23	24	25	26	27	28	29	30	31	32	33	34	35	36	37	38	39	40	41	NGNC	Pts	Ref
1951	Bob Phillippi	18	Mercury	DAB	CLT	NMO	GAR	HBO	ASF	NWS	MAR	CAN	CLS	CLB	DAY	GAR	GRS	BAI	HEI	AWS	MCF	ALS	MSF	FMS	MOR	ABS	DAR	CLB	CCS	LAN	CLT	DAY	WIL	HBO	TPN	PGS	MAR	OAK; 1*	NWS	HMS	JSP	ATL	GAR	NMO	NA	-	
