= Frank Luptow =

American racing driver (1915–1952)

- Nationality: American
- Born: Frank Lueptow; November 20, 1915 Markesan, Wisconsin, U.S.
- Died: September 21, 1952 (aged 36) Lakewood Speedway, Atlanta, Georgia, U.S.

IMCA "big car"
- Best finish: 1st in 1949, 1950, and 1951

Awards
- National Sprint Car Hall of Fame (1995); Michigan Motor Sports Hall of Fame (1988)

NASCAR Cup Series career
- 5 races run over 2 years
- Best finish: 69th (1951)
- First race: 1950 Race No. 1 (Daytona Beach Road Course)
- Last race: 1951 Race No. 5 (Occoneechee)
Wins	Top tens	Poles
0	1	0

Frank William Luptow Jr. (born Frank Lueptow; November 20, 1915 – September 21, 1952) was an American racing driver. He competed in International Motor Contest Association (IMCA) big cars (now sprint cars) and NASCAR stock cars. He won the 1949, 1950, and 1951 IMCA big car championships.

== Background ==
Luptow was born at Markesan, Wisconsin on November 20, 1915, to Frank and Ida Lueptow with Dutch heritage. He later dropped the "E" from his last name.

== Racing career ==
Luptow moved to Detroit, Michigan and won in his first race at Jackson. He raced in several Central States Racing Association (CSRA) races before World War II. During the war, he was a test driver for tanks. After his discharge from the military, he moved back to Detroit and worked for a tank manufacturer. In August 1946, Luptow won his first "big car" (now sprint car) feature at an IMCA event at Davenport Speedway. In 1947, he had two top-ten IMCA finishes at the Iowa State Fairgrounds and finished 20th in season points.

Luptow won 1948 IMCA races at Lebanon, Ohio, Eldon, Iowa, Danville, Illinois, Nashville, Tennessee, Plant Field (Tampa, Florida), Speedway Park (Tampa), and Birmingham, Alabama. He finished third in season points behind Emory Collins and Deb Snyder. After the regular season ended, he kept racing at Tampa-area venues from October to March 1949.

Luptow started the 1949 season by replacing his Hal engine with an Offenhauser and his car began to be known as the "Black Panther." That season he won 33 of 40 features to take the IMCA national championship. Luptow's most dominating season happened in 1950 as he won 35 of 48 features along with 11 second place finishes. He also competed in a NASCAR Grand National (now Cup Series) stock car race, finishing 18th at the season-opening Daytona Beach Road Course. He started the 1951 season by racing in four NASCAR Grand National races, with finishes of 53rd at Daytona, fifth at Charlotte, 11th at Lakewood Speedway, and 30th at Occoneechee Speedway. In 1951, he won 33 features to win his third straight IMCA championship.

In 1952, Luptow switched to racing the American Automobile Association (AAA) big cars, Champ cars and stock cars. Luptow switched to stock cars at the behest of his wife, who wanted him to quit entirely because of the danger of open-wheel cockpits. He failed to qualify for four Championship car events including the 1952 Indianapolis 500. In the stock car, he won twice in August at the Milwaukee Mile and the Terre Haute Action Track. During the September 21, 1952 AAA stock car race at Lakewood Speedway, Luptow's front axle broke causing the car the flip. He was partially ejected out of the car and died shortly afterward of head injuries after the car rolled on top of him. Luptow had previously planned on racing at Terre Haute that day but traveled down to Lakewood as a favor to AAA, who wanted more star power at the Lakewood event.

== Personal life ==
Luptow married beauty queen Betty Drake. The couple had a daughter named Susan. Betty later married Bobby Grim and Susan married racer Rocky Hodges.

== Career awards ==
Luptow was inducted in the Michigan Motorsports Hall of Fame in 1988. He was inducted in the National Sprint Car Hall of Fame in 1995.

== Motorsports career results ==
=== NASCAR ===
(key) (Bold – Pole position awarded by qualifying time. Italics – Pole position earned by points standings or practice time. * – Most laps led.)

==== Grand National Series ====
NASCAR Grand National Series results
Year	Team	No.	Make	1	2	3	4	5	6	7	8	9	10	11	12	13	14	15	16	17	18	19	20	21	22	23	24	25	26	27	28	29	30	31	32	33	34	35	36	37	38	39	40	41	NGNC	Pts	Ref
1950	Frank Luptow	9	Lincoln	DAB; 18	CLT	LAN	MAR	CAN	VER	DSP	MCF	CLT	HBO	DSP	HAM	DAR	LAN	NWS	VER	MAR	WIN	HBO																							128th	N/A	
1951	Joe Winter	88	Olds	DAB; 53	CLT; 5	NMO; 11	GAR																																						69th	136	
1951	Joe Winter	9	Olds					HBO; 30	ASF	NWS	MAR	CAN	CLS	CLB	DSP	GAR	GRS	BAI	HEI	AWS	MCF	ALS	MSF	FMS	MOR	ABS	DAR	CLB	CCS	LAN	CLT	DSP	WIL	HBO	TPN	PGS	MAR	OAK	NWS	HMS	JSP	ATL	GAR	NMO	69th	136	
