= Pappy Hough =

American racing driver (1903–1996)

- Born: Roscoe M. Hough; November 22, 1903
- Died: June 17, 1996 (aged 92)

Championship titles
- 1951 NASCAR Short Track Series Champion

NASCAR Cup Series career
- 21 races run over 4 years
- Best finish: 26th (1950)
- First race: 1950 Race 3 (Langhorne)
- Last race: 1955 Race 29 (Syracuse)
Wins	Top tens	Poles
0	7	1

Roscoe "Pappy" Hough (November 22, 1903 – June 17, 1996) was an American racing driver, mechanic and car owner. Hough reportedly raced at some 560 tracks and is said to have won over 1,000 races as a driver and car owner.

== Racing career ==
Originally from Fort Wayne, Indiana, Hough started driving Sprint cars and Midgets in the 1920s. He eventually moved to the Northeast and to stock cars.

Hough made 21 appearances in the NASCAR Grand National Series. He was the first champion of the NASCAR Short Track Division in 1951 and voted most popular driver by his competitors.

Hough was the first inductee in the National Midget Auto Racing Hall of Fame, and was also inducted into the Eastern Motorsports Press and Association and Northeast Dirt Modified Halls of Fame.

== Motorsports career results ==
=== NASCAR ===
(key) (Bold – Pole position awarded by qualifying time. Italics – Pole position earned by points standings or practice time. * – Most laps led.)

==== Grand National Series ====
NASCAR Grand National Series results
Year	Team	No.	Make	1	2	3	4	5	6	7	8	9	10	11	12	13	14	15	16	17	18	19	20	21	22	23	24	25	26	27	28	29	30	31	32	33	34	35	36	37	38	39	40	41	42	43	44	45	NGNSC	Pts	Ref
1950	Pappy Hough	66	Ford	DAB	CLT	LAN; 7	MAR	CAN			MCF; 18	CLT	HBO	DSP	HAM; 9	DAR	LAN; 28	NWS	VER	MAR	WIN	HBO																											26th	211.5	
1950	Pappy Hough	81	Plymouth						VER; 11	DSP																																							26th	211.5	
1951	Pappy Hough	81	Ford	DAB; 32	CLT	NMO	GAR	HBO	ASF	NWS	MAR	CAN	CLS	CLB	DSP	GAR	GRS	BAI	HEI; 33	AWS; 7	MCF; 5	ALS; 6	MSF	FMS								DSP; 20	WIL	HBO	TPN; 6	PGS	MAR; 6	OAK	NWS	HMS	JSP	ATL	GAR	NMO					31st	423	
1951	Pappy Hough	66	Ford																						MOR; 24	ABS	DAR	CLB	CCS	LAN; 18	CLT																		31st	423	
1952	Pappy Hough	81	Ford	PBS; 12	DAB	JSP	NWS	MAR	CLB	ATL	CCS	LAN	DAR	DSP	CAN	HAY	FMS	HBO	CLT	MSF	NIF	OSW	MON	MOR; 6	PPS																										
1952	Pappy Hough	81	Plymouth																							**MCF**; 16	AWS	DAR	CCS	LAN; 19	DSP	WIL	HBO	MAR	NWS	ATL	PBS														
1955	Pappy Hough	81	Oldsmobile	TCS	PBS	JSP	DAB	OSP	CLB	HBO	NWS	MGY	LAN	CLT	HCY	ASF	TUS	MAR	RCH	NCF	FOR	LIN	MCF	FON	AIR	CLT	PIF	CLB	AWS	MOR; 13	ALS; 15	NYF; 12	SAN	CLT	FOR	MAS	RSP	DAR	MGY	LAN	RSP	GPS	MAS	CLB	MAR	LVP	NWS	HBO	85th	–	
