= Neil Cole (racing driver) =

American race car driver

- Born: May 27, 1926 (age 100); Oakland, New Jersey, U.S.
- Died: February 16, 2016 (aged 89)

NASCAR Cup Series career
- 19 races run over 4 years
- Best finish: 19th (1952)
- First race: 1950 Race 6 (Vernon)
- Last race: 1953 Race 8 (Langhorne)
- First win: 1951 Race 32 (Thompson)
| Wins | Top tens | Poles |
|---|---|---|
| 1 | 11 | 1 |

Neil Cole (May 27, 1926 – February 16, 2016) was an American stock car racing driver who competed in 19 NASCAR Grand National events between 1950 and 1953. Cole finished his NASCAR career with ten top-tens and one career win, which came at Thompson Speedway in 1951.

== Motorsports career results ==
=== NASCAR ===
(key) (Bold – Pole position awarded by qualifying time. Italics – Pole position earned by points standings or practice time. * – Most laps led.)

==== Grand National Series ====
NASCAR Grand National Series results
| Year | Team | No. | Make | 1 | 2 | 3 | 4 | 5 | 6 | 7 | 8 | 9 | 10 | 11 | 12 | 13 | 14 | 15 | 16 | 17 | 18 | 19 | 20 | 21 | 22 | 23 | 24 | 25 | 26 | 27 | 28 | 29 | 30 | 31 | 32 | 33 | 34 | 35 | 36 | 37 | 38 | 39 | 40 | 41 | NGNC | Pts | Ref |
|---|---|---|---|---|---|---|---|---|---|---|---|---|---|---|---|---|---|---|---|---|---|---|---|---|---|---|---|---|---|---|---|---|---|---|---|---|---|---|---|---|---|---|---|---|---|---|---|
| 1950 | | 89 | Ford | DAB | CLT | LAN | MAR | CAN | VER; 18 | DSP | MCF | CLT | HBO | DSP | HAM | DAR | LAN; 5 | NWS | VER | MAR | WIN | HBO | | | | | | | | | | | | | | | | | | | | | | | 31st | 183.5 | |
| 1951 | John Golabek | 52 | Olds | DAB | CLT | NMO | GAR | HBO; 5 | ASF | NWS | MAR | CAN | CLS | CLB | DSP | GAR | GRS | BAI | HEI | AWS | MCF | ALS | MSF | FMS | MOR; 25 | ABS | DAR | CLB | CCS | LAN | CLT | DSP; 2 | WIL | HBO | **TPN**; 1 | PGS | MAR; 17 | OAK | NWS | HMS | JSP | ATL | GAR | NMO | 33rd | 382 | |
| 1952 | John Golabek | 53 | Plymouth | PBS | DAB | JSP | NWS; 6 | MAR; 6 | CLB | ATL | CCS | | | | | | | | CLT; 21 | MSF | NIF; 6 | OSW; 9 | MON | MOR; 3 | PPS | MCF; 9 | AWS | DAR | CCS | LAN; 7 | DSP | WIL | HBO | MAR | NWS | ATL | PBS | | | | | | | | 19th | 1618 | |
| 1952 | John Golabek | 53 | Hudson | | | | | | | | | LAN; 12 | DAR | DSP | CAN; 14 | HAY | FMS; 20 | HBO | | | | | | | | | | | | | | | | | | | | | | | | | | | 19th | 1618 | |
| 1953 | John Golabek | 24 | Plymouth | PBS | DAB | HAR | NWS | CLT | RCH | CCS | LAN | CLB | HCY | MAR | PMS | RSP | LOU | FFS | LAN; 24 | TCS | WIL | MCF | PIF | MOR | ATL | RVS | LCF | DAV | HBO | AWS | PAS | HCY | DAR | CCS | LAN | BLF | WIL | NWS | MAR | ATL | | | | | 165th | 24 | |
