= 1951 NASCAR Grand National Series =

American motorsport season

1951 Grand National Series

Seasons
- ← 1950 1952 →

The 1951 NASCAR Grand National season was the third season of professional stock car racing in the United States. Beginning at the Daytona Beach Road Course on February 5, 1951, the season included forty-one races. The season concluded at New Mobile Speedway on November 25. Herb Thomas won the Drivers' Championship with a 21st-place finish at the final race of the season.

== Schedule ==
The schedule more than doubled for the 1951 season, increasing to 41 races. 32 different circuits in 14 different states held races. Race 1951–04 was the first race held west of the Mississippi River; five races were held in California, in addition to one race held in Arizona. The Southern 500 and the Motor City 250 had the largest purses and therefore awarded the highest points.

| No. | Date | Race title | Track | Miles | Purse |
|---|---|---|---|---|---|
| 1 | February 5 | 1951–01 | (Florida) Daytona Beach Road Course, Daytona Beach | 160 | $6225 |
| 2 | April 1 | 1951–02 | (North Carolina) Charlotte Speedway, Charlotte | 113 | $3790 |
| 3 | April 8 | 1951–03 | (Alabama) Lakeview Speedway, Mobile | 113 | $3550 |
| 4 | April 8 | 1951–04 | (California) Carrell Speedway, Gardena | 100 | $3450 |
| 5 | April 15 | 1951–05 | (North Carolina) Occoneechee Speedway, Hillsboro | 95 | $4665 |
| 6 | April 22 | 1951–06 | Arizona State Fairgrounds, Phoenix | 150 | $4650 |
| 7 | April 29 | Wilkes County 150 | (North Carolina) North Wilkesboro Speedway, North Wilkesboro | 94 | $3780 |
| 8 | May 6 | 1951–08 | (Virginia) Martinsville Speedway, Ridgeway | 100 | $3750 |
| 9 | May 30 | Poor Man's 500 | (Ohio) Canfield Speedway, Canfield | 100 | $3780 |
| 10 | June 10 | 1951–10 | (Georgia (U.S. state)) Columbus Speedway, Columbus | 100 | $3710 |
| 11 | June 16 | 1951–11 | (South Carolina) Columbia Speedway, Columbia | 100 | $3740 |
| 12 | June 24 | 1951–12 | (Ohio) Dayton Speedway, Dayton | 100 | $3675 |
| 13 | June 30 | 1951–13 | (California) Carrell Speedway, Gardena | 100 | $3600 |
| 14 | July 1 | 1951–14 | (Michigan) Grand River Speedrome, Grand Rapids | 100 | $3475 |
| 15 | July 8 | 1951–15 | (Ohio) Bainbridge Speedway, Bainbridge | 100 | $3740 |
| 16 | July 15 | 1951–16 | (Pennsylvania) Heidelberg Raceway, Heidelberg | 100 | $3800 |
| 17 | July 29 | 1951–17 | (North Carolina) Asheville-Weaverville Speedway, Weaverville | 100 | $3700 |
| 18 | July 31 | 1951–18 | (New York (state)) Monroe County Fairgrounds, Rochester | 100 | $3525 |
| 19 | August 1 | 1951–19 | (New York (state)) Altamont-Schenectady Fairgrounds, Altamont | 100 | $3450 |
| 20 | August 12 | Motor City 250 | Michigan State Fairgrounds Speedway, Detroit | 250 | $10975 |
| 21 | August 19 | 1951–21 | (Ohio) Fort Miami Speedway, Toledo | 100 | $3730 |
| 22 | August 24 | 1951–22 | (New Jersey) Morristown Speedway, Morristown | 100 | $3840 |
| 23 | August 25 | 1951–23 | (South Carolina) Air Base Speedway, Greenville | 100 | $3325 |
| 24 | September 3 | Southern 500 | (South Carolina) Darlington Raceway, Darlington | 500 | $23740 |
| 25 | September 7 | 1951–25 | (South Carolina) Columbia Speedway, Columbia | 100 | $3675 |
| 26 | September 8 | 1951–26 | (Georgia (U.S. state)) Central City Speedway, Macon | 100 | $3500 |
| 27 | September 15 | 1951–27 | (Pennsylvania) Langhorne Speedway, Langhorne | 150 | $4800 |
| 28 | September 23 | 1951–28 | (North Carolina) Charlotte Speedway, Charlotte | 150 | $3600 |
| 29 | September 23 | 1951–29 | (Ohio) Dayton Speedway, Dayton | 100 | $3710 |
| 30 | September 30 | 1951–30 | (North Carolina) Wilson Speedway, Wilson | 100 | $3375 |
| 31 | October 7 | 1951–31 | (North Carolina) Occoneechee Speedway, Hillsboro | 150 | $3550 |
| 32 | October 12 | 1951–32 | (Connecticut) Thompson Speedway, Thompson | 100 | $3500 |
| 33 | October 14 | 1951–33 | (Pennsylvania) Pine Grove Speedway, Shippenville | 100 | $3450 |
| 34 | October 14 | 1951–34 | (Virginia) Martinsville Speedway, Ridgeway | 100 | $3523 |
| 35 | October 14 | 1951–35 | (California) Oakland Stadium, Oakland | 156 | $6625 |
| 36 | October 21 | Wilkes 200 | (North Carolina) North Wilkesboro Speedway, North Wilkesboro | 125 | $3600 |
| 37 | October 28 | 1951–37 | (California) Marchbanks Speedway, Hanford | 100 | $3550 |
| 38 | November 4 | 1951–38 | (Florida) Jacksonville Speedway Park, Jacksonville | 100 | $3500 |
| 39 | November 11 | 1951–39 | (Georgia (U.S. state)) Lakewood Speedway, Atlanta | 100 | $3725 |
| 40 | November 11 | 1951–40 | (California) Carrell Speedway, Gardena | 100 | $3675 |
| 41 | November 25 | 1951–41 | (Alabama) Lakeview Speedway, Mobile | 113 | $3550 |

== Race summaries ==
=== 1951–01 ===
The first race of the 1951 season was run on February 5 at the Daytona Beach Road Course in Daytona Beach, Florida. Tim Flock won the pole position.

Top ten results

1. 6-Marshall Teague
2. 91-Tim Flock
3. 14-Fonty Flock
4. 41.5-Bill Blair
5. 87-Buck Baker
6. 55-Lee Snow
7. 41-Curtis Turner
8. 16-Bill Snowden
9. 98-Johnny Mantz
10. 59-Lloyd Moore

=== 1951–02 ===
The second race of the 1951 season was held on April 1 at the Charlotte Speedway. Fonty Flock won the pole

Top ten results

1. 41-Curtis Turner
2. 42-Lee Petty
3. 6-Marshall Teague
4. 92-Herb Thomas
5. 88-Frank Luptow
6. 72-Weldon Adams
7. 77-Ewell Weddie
8. 11-Fireball Roberts
9. 19-Joe Merola
10. 10-Jim Fiebelkorn

=== 1951–03 ===
The third race of the 1951 season was held on April 8 at the Lakeview Speedway in Mobile, Alabama. Red Harrelson won the pole.

Top ten results

1. 91-Tim Flock
2. 14-Fonty Flock
3. 92-Herb Thomas
4. 9-Bill Osborne
5. 93-Donald Thomas
6. 19-Lamar Crabtree
7. 42-Lee Petty
8. 7-Bob Flock
9. 8-Sonny Black
10. 3-Jimmy Ayers

=== 1951–04 ===
The fourth race of the 1951 season was held on April 8 at the Carrell Speedway in Gardena, California. It was the first NASCAR race ever staged west of the Mississippi River. Andy Pierce won the pole.

Top ten results

1. 6-Marshall Teague
2. 98-Johnny Mantz
3. George Seeger
4. 16-Fred Steinbroner
5. 1-Erick Erickson
6. 9-Dick Meyer
7. Dick Rathman
8. Danny Letner
9. Leo Breithaupt
10. 22-Lloyd Dane

=== 1951–05 ===
The fifth race of the 1951 season was held on April 15 at the Occoneechee Speedway. Fonty Flock won the pole. The race ended after 95 laps due to rain.

Top ten results

1. 14-Fonty Flock
2. 23-Frank Mundy
3. 41.5-Bill Blair
4. 91-Tim Flock
5. 52-Neil Cole
6. 110-Earl Moss
7. 92-Herb Thomas
8. 71-Jim Paschal
9. 42-Lee Petty
10. 55-Glenn Dunaway

=== 1951–06 ===
The sixth race of the 1951 season was held on April 22 at the Arizona State Fairgrounds in Phoenix, Arizona. Fonty Flock won the pole.

Top ten results

1. 6-Marshall Teague
2. 11-Erick Erickson
3. 91-Tim Flock
4. 14-Fonty Flock
5. 9-Dick Meyer
6. 12-Danny Weinberg
7. 1-Walt Sprague
8. Bill Holland
9. 26-Leland Colvin
10. 18-Bill Stammer

=== Wilkes County 150 ===
The seventh race of the 1951 season was held on April 29 at the North Wilkesboro Speedway. Fonty Flock won the pole

Top ten results

1. 14-Fonty Flock
2. 91-Tim Flock
3. 42-Lee Petty
4. 98-Bill Holland
5. 93-Donald Thomas
6. 59-Lloyd Moore
7. 60-Jimmie Lewallen
8. 155-Glenn Dunaway
9. 5-Dale Williams
10. 83-Jimmy Ayers

=== 1951–08 ===
The eight race of the 1951 season was held on May 6 at the Martinsville Speedway. Tim Flock won the pole.

Top ten results

1. 41-Curtis Turner
2. 23-Frank Mundy
3. 91-Tim Flock
4. 92-Herb Thomas
5. 14-Fonty Flock
6. 42-Lee Petty
7. 1-Walt Sprague
8. 2-Bill Blair
9. 26-Leland Colvin
10. 7-Bob Flock

=== Poor Man's 500 ===
The ninth race of the 1951 season was held on May 30 at the Canfield Speedway. Bill Rexford won the pole.

Top ten results

1. 6-Marshall Teague
2. 91-Tim Flock
3. 14-Fonty Flock
4. 92-Herb Thomas
5. 42-Lee Petty
6. 7-Bob Flock
7. 23-Frank Mundy
8. 77-Mike Klapak
9. 120-Dick Rathmann
10. 6-Don Eggett

=== 1951–10 ===
The tenth race of the 1951 season was held on June 10 at the Columbus Speedway in Columbus, Georgia. Gober Sosebee won the pole. During the first caution, Marshall Teague suffered a leg injury when his car was hit in the side near the back straightaway by Fireball Roberts.

Top ten results

1. 91-Tim Flock
2. 51-Gober Sosebee
3. 92-Herb Thomas
4. 60-Jim Paschal
5. 42-Lee Petty
6. 22-Red Byron
7. 93-Donald Thomas
8. 23-Frank Mundy
9. 83-Jimmy Ayers
10. 4-Ed Massey

=== 1951–11 ===
The eleventh race of the 1951 season was held on June 16 at the Columbia Speedway in Columbia, South Carolina. Frank Mundy won the pole.

Top ten results

1. 23-Frank Mundy
2. 98-Bill Blair
3. 6-Marshall Teague
4. 92-Herb Thomas
5. 87-Buck Baker
6. 60-Jim Paschal
7. 91-Tim Flock
8. 16-Bill Snowden
9. 72-Weldon Adams
10. Jim Harris

=== 1951–12 ===
The twelfth race of the 1951 season was held on June 24 at the Dayton Speedway. Tim Flock won the pole.

Top ten results

1. 41-Curtis Turner
2. 120-Dick Rathmann
3. 91-Tim Flock
4. 14-Fonty Flock
5. 59-Lloyd Moore
6. 6-Marshall Teague
7. 1-Walt Sprague
8. Bub King
9. 60-Don Eggett
10. Red Harvey

=== 1951–13 ===
The thirteenth race of the 1951 season was held on June 30 at the Carrell Speedway. Lou Figaro won the pole.

Top ten results

1. 33-Lou Figaro
2. 7-Chuck Meekins
3. 22-Lloyd Dane
4. 11-Fred Bince
5. 16-Fred Steinbroner
6. 1-Erick Erickson
7. Hal Cole
8. 98-Freddie Farmer
9. 18-Bill Stammer
10. 27-Jim Byrd

=== 1951–14 ===
The fourteenth race of the 1951 season was held on July 1 at the Grand River Speedrome in Grand Rapids, Michigan. Marshall Teague won the pole.

Top ten results

1. 6-Marshall Teague
2. 120-Dick Rathmann
3. 14-Fonty Flock
4. 91-Tim Flock
5. 59-Lloyd Moore
6. 42-Lee Petty
7. 23-Frank Mundy
8. 27-Jimmy Florian
9. Quinton Daniels
10. Tommy Lane

=== 1951–15 ===
The fifteenth race of the 1951 season was held on July 8 at the Bainbridge Speedway in Bainbridge, Ohio. Fonty Flock won the pole.

Top ten results

1. 14-Fonty Flock
2. 120-Dick Rathmann
3. 23-Frank Mundy
4. 27-Jimmy Florian
5. 22-Oda Greene
6. 42-Lee Petty
7. 10-Jim Fiebelkorn
8. Norm McCarthy
9. Lyle Scott
10. Jim Romine

=== 1951–16 ===
The sixteenth race of the 1951 season was held on July 15 at the Heidelberg Raceway. Fonty Flock won the pole. A six-car crash on the 21st lap took Flock out of the race, and let Herb Thomas inherit the lead. The crash left Wally Campbell hospitalized and Flock with a cut over his eye, though he continued racing. Thomas led the remaining 179 laps and went on to win his first race of the season, over a lap ahead of second-place Firbelkorn.

Top ten results

1. 41½ - Herb Thomas
2. 10 - Jim Fiebelkorn
3. Augie Walackas
4. Bud Farrell
5. Tom Jerris
6. Jack Flynn
7. Bob Dietrich
8. Dick Moffitt
9. Harry Scott
10. Charles Gillman

=== 1951–17 ===
The seventeenth race of the 1951 season was held on July 29 at the Asheville-Weaverville Speedway. Fonty Flock won the pole.

Top ten results

1. 14-Fonty Flock
2. 51-Gober Sosebee
3. 92-Herb Thomas
4. 23-Frank Mundy
5. Speedy Thompson
6. Bub King
7. 217-Bill Miller
8. Billy Myers
9. 16-Bill Snowden
10. 7-Bob Flock

=== 1951–18 ===
The eighteenth race of the 1951 season was held on July 31 at the Monroe County Fairgrounds in Rochester, New York. Fonty Flock won the pole.

Top ten results

1. 42-Lee Petty
2. Charles Gattalia
3. Ronnie Kohler
4. 54-Don Bailey
5. 81-Pappy Hough
6. 60-Bill Rexford
7. Chuck Stimus
8. 93-Ted Chamberlain
9. Ernie Yorton
10. 25-Dick Linder

=== 1951–19 ===
The nineteenth race of the 1951 season was held on August 1 at the Altamont-Schenectady Fairgrounds. Fonty Flock won the pole.

Top ten results

1. 14-Fonty Flock
2. 92-Herb Thomas
3. 42-Lee Petty
4. 23-Perry Smith
5. 227-Jerry Morese
6. 81-Pappy Hough
7. Dick Moffitt
8. Wimpy Ervin
9. Jim Little
10. 25-Dick Linder

=== Motor City 250 ===
The twentieth race of the 1951 season was held on August 12 at the Michigan State Fairgrounds Speedway. Marshall Teague won the pole. This race had five cautions including nine cars with mechanical problems and a 10-car wreck on lap 130. The race ended with 21 cars on the lead lap. Late in the race leaders Curtis Turner and Tommy Thompson tangled. Thompson went on to win while Turner finished ninth.

Top ten results

1. 40-Tommy Thompson
2. 82-Joe Eubanks
3. 98-Johnny Mantz
4. 83-Red Byron
5. 43-Paul Newkirk
6. 34-Jack Goodwin
7. 59-Lloyd Moore
8. 50-Ewell Weddie
9. 41-Curtis Turner
10. 1-X-Erick Erickson

=== 1951–21 ===
The twenty-first race of the 1951 season was held on August 19 at the newly surfaced Fort Miami Speedway in Toledo, Ohio. Fonty Flock won the pole. This was the first NASCAR Grand National race held at this .500 mile dirt track. The track was removed from the schedule until at least 1952.

Top ten results

1. 91-Tim Flock
2. 88-Dell Pearson
3. 22-Oda Greene
4. 33-Lou Figaro
5. 92-Herb Thomas
6. 40-Tommy Thompson
7. 31-Jesse James Taylor
8. 18-George Seeger
9. 27-Jimmy Florian
10. 3-Jimmy Ayers

=== 1951–22 ===
The twenty-second race of the 1951 season was held on August 24 at the Morristown Speedway. Tim Flock won the pole.

Top ten results

1. 91-Tim Flock
2. 42-Lee Petty
3. Ronnie Kohler
4. John DuBoise
5. 21-Jim Delaney
6. 421-Jack Reynolds
7. 22-Oda Greene
8. Dick Eagan
9. 77-Chuck Mahoney
10. Augie Walackas

=== 1951–23 ===
The twenty-third race of the 1951 season was held on August 25 at the Air Base Speedway in Greenville, South Carolina. Tim Flock won the pole.

Top ten results

1. 7-Bob Flock
2. 91-Tim Flock
3. 87-Buck Baker
4. 14-Fonty Flock
5. 1-X-Erick Erickson
6. 92-Herb Thomas
7. 42-Lee Petty
8. 31-Jesse James Taylor
9. 120-Dick Rathmann
10. 17-Buddy Shuman

=== Southern 500 ===
The second running of this race and the twenty-fourth race of the 1951 season was held on September 3 at the Darlington Raceway. Frank Mundy won the pole. The race featured an 82-car field. This was Red Byron's last career start.

Top ten results

1. 92-Herb Thomas
2. 31-Jesse James Taylor
3. 17-Buddy Shuman
4. 77-Hershel McGriff
5. 11-Fireball Roberts
6. 1-Harold Kite
7. 46-Leon Sales
8. 14-Fonty Flock
9. 16-Bill Snowden
10. 24-Pap White

=== 1951–25 ===
The twenty-fifth race of the 1951 season was held on September 7 at the Columbia Speedway. Tim Flock won the pole.

Top ten results

1. 91-Tim Flock
2. 11-Fireball Roberts
3. 0-Jimmie Lewallen
4. 7-Bob Flock
5. 87-Buck Baker
6. 93-Donald Thomas
7. 71-Cotton Owens
8. 70-Bud Farrell
9. 16-Bill Snowden
10. 14-Fonty Flock

=== 1951–26 ===
The twenty-sixth race of the 1951 season was held on September 8 at the Central City Speedway. Bob Flock won the pole.

Top ten results

1. 91-Herb Thomas
2. 51-Gober Sosebee
3. 60-Jim Paschal
4. 14-Fonty Flock
5. 93-Donald Thomas
6. 71-Cotton Owens
7. 38-Frank Gise
8. 8-Billy Carden
9. Bill Miller
10. Augie Walackas

=== 1951–27 ===
The twenty-seventh race of the 1951 season was held on September 15 at the Langhorne Speedway. Fonty Flock won the pole.

Top ten results

1. 91-Herb Thomas
2. 14-Fonty Flock
3. 21-Dick Rathmann
4. 120-John McGinley
5. 91-Tim Flock
6. 6-Marshall Teague
7. 67-Jim Fiebelkorn
8. 66-Bud Riley
9. 42-Lee Petty
10. 2-Bill Blair

=== 1951–28 ===
The twenty-eight race of the 1951 season was held on September 23 at the Charlotte Speedway. Billy Carden won the pole.

Top ten results

1. 92-Herb Thomas
2. 90-Shorty York
3. 93-Donald Thomas
4. 2-Bill Blair
5. 0-Jimmie Lewallen
6. 17-Buddy Shuman
7. 8-Billy Carden
8. 88-Dell Pearson
9. 60-Jim Paschal
10. 53-Clyde Minter

=== 1951–29 ===
The twenty-ninth race of the 1951 season was held on September 23 at the Dayton Speedway. Fonty Flock won the pole.

Top ten results

1. 14-Fonty Flock
2. 52-Neil Cole
3. 59-Lloyd Moore
4. 42-Lee Petty
5. 66-Bud Riley
6. Ronnie Kohler
7. Jimmy Florian
8. 54-Don Bailey
9. 89-Herb Trimble
10. Bill Braun

=== 1951–30 ===
The thirtieth race of the 1951 season was held on September 30 at the newly .500 mile dirt track Wilson Speedway. Fonty Flock won the pole.

Top ten results

1. 14-Fonty Flock
2. 7-Bob Flock
3. 0-Jimmie Lewallen
4. 60-Jim Paschal
5. 16-Bill Snowden
6. 87-Buck Baker
7. Cal Johnson
8. 99-Leonard Tippett
9. Bill Champion
10. 93-Donald Thomas

=== 1951–31 ===
The thirty-first race of the 1951 season was held on October 7 at the one-mile dirt Occoneechee Speedway. Herb Thomas won his first career pole.

Top ten results

1. 92-Herb Thomas
2. 99-Leonard Tippett
3. 82-Joe Eubanks
4. 60-Jim Paschal
5. 42-Lee Petty
6. 93-Donald Thomas
7. Furman Lancaster
8. Alton Haddock
9. 2-Bill Blair
10. 37-Coleman Lawrence

=== 1951–32 ===
The thirty-second race of the 1951 season was held on October 12 at the half-mile paved Thompson Speedway in Connecticut. Neil Cole won the pole.

Top ten results

1. 52-Neil Cole
2. 67-Jim Reed
3. Dick Eagan
4. 8-Billy Carden
5. 32-Reino Tulonen
6. 81-Pappy Hough
7. 91-Tim Flock
8. Joe Sommers
9. Bill Cintia
10. 21-Jim Delaney

=== 1951–33 ===
The thirty-third race of the 1951 season was held on October 14 at the half-mile dirt Pine Grove Speedway in Pennsylvania.

Top ten results

1. 91-Tim Flock
2. 120-John McGinley
3. 8-Billy Carden
4. Jimmy Florian
5. 59-Lloyd Moore
6. Hap Jones
7. Ed Benedict
8. Bob Dietrich
9. Russ Hepler
10. Dick Stone

=== 1951–34 ===
The thirty-fourth race of the 1951 season was held on October 14 at the half-mile dirt Martinsville Speedway in Virginia. Herb Thomas won the pole.

Top ten results

1. 7-Frank Mundy
2. 42-Lee Petty
3. 22-Billy Myers
4. 16-Bill Snowden
5. 0-Jimmie Lewallen
6. Pappy Hough
7. 37-Coleman Lawrence
8. 98-Leon Sales
9. 88-Dell Pearson
10. Cal Johnson

=== 1951–35 ===
The thirty-fifth race of the 1951 season was held on October 14 at the .625 mile dirt Oakland Stadium in California. Dick Rathman won the pole.

Top ten results

1. 18-Marvin Burke
2. 84-Robert Caswell
3. Woody Brown
4. 55-Sam Hawks
5. 9-Dick Meyer
6. 56-Marvin Panch
7. 33-Lou Figaro
8. Bill Norton
9. John Soares
10. Walt Davis
- Burke remains the only driver in NASCAR history to win in his only start.

=== Wilkes 200 ===
The third running of this race and the thirty-sixth race of the 1951 season was held on October 21 at the .625 mile dirt North Wilkesboro Speedway in North Carolina. Herb Thomas won the pole.

Top ten results

1. 14-Fonty Flock
2. 42-Lee Petty
3. 82-Joe Eubanks
4. 91-Tim Flock
5. 71-Cotton Owens
6. 16-Bill Snowden
7. 0-Jimmie Lewallen
8. 17-Buddy Schuman
9. Jerry Wimbish
10. 7-Bob Flock

=== 1951–37 ===
The thirty-seventh race of the 1951 season was held on October 28 at the half-mile dirt Marchbanks Speedway in California. Dick Rathman won the pole.

Top ten results

1. 2-Danny Weinberg
2. 56-Marvin Panch
3. Bill Norton
4. 22-Lloyd Dane
5. Woody Brown
6. Claude Wallington
7. 7-Fred Bince
8. Fred Russell
9. Pug Blalock
10. 16-Fred Steinbroner

=== 1951–38 ===
The thirty-eighth race of the 1951 season was held on November 4 at the half-mile dirt Jacksonville Speedway Park in Florida. Herb Thomas won the pole.

Top ten results

1. 6-Herb Thomas
2. 44-Jack Smith
3. 14-Fonty Flock
4. 16-Bill Snowden
5. 23-Frank Mundy
6. Tommy Moon
7. 42-Lee Petty
8. 0-Jimmie Lewallen
9. 17-Buddy Shuman
10. 8-Billy Carden

=== 1951–39 ===
The thirty-ninth race of the 1951 season was held on November 11 at the one-mile dirt Lakeview Speedway in Georgia. Frank Mundy won the pole.

Top ten results

1. 91-Tim Flock
2. 7-Bob Flock
3. 44X-Jack Smith
4. 23-Frank Mundy
5. 51-Gober Sosebee
6. Ed Samples
7. 59-Lloyd Moore
8. 17-Buddy Shuman
9. Red Duvall
10. Don Oldenberg

=== 1951–40 ===
The fortieth race of the 1951 season was held on November 11 at the half-mile dirt Carrell Speedway in California. Fonty Flock won the pole.

Top ten results

1. 48-Bill Norton
2. 9-Dick Meyer
3. 25-Erick Erickson
4. 33-Lou Figaro
5. Danny Weinberg
6. 6-Bill Ledbetter
7. 77-Burt Jackson
8. 98-Johnny Mantz
9. 36-Danny Letner
10. Walt Davis

=== 1951–41 ===
The forty-first and last race of the 1951 season was held on November 25 at the .750 mile dirt New Mobile Speedway. Frank Mundy won the pole. Herb Thomas finished 21st and went home as 1951 NASCAR Grand National champion. Fonty and Tim Flock finished fourth and second respectively to eventually finish second and third in the championship, and their brother Bob Flock got in a massive accident and broke his neck when his roof collapsed. Mundy's win at New Mobile propelled him to fifth in the final standings, while Lee Petty, winner of just one race, at the Monroe County Fairgrounds, finished 16th in the race to claim fourth in the standings.

Top ten results

1. 23-Frank Mundy
2. 91-Tim Flock
3. 87-Red Duvall
4. 14-Fonty Flock
5. 142-Don Oldenberg
6. 20-Buddy Shuman
7. 51-Gober Sosebee
8. 9-Ed Samples
9. 24-Jimmie Lewallen
10. 80-Sonny Black

== Results and standings ==
=== Races ===
| No. | Race | Pole position | Most laps led | Winning driver | Manufacturer | Model Year |
|---|---|---|---|---|---|---|
| 1 | 1951–01 | (Georgia (U.S. state)) Tim Flock | (Georgia (U.S. state)) Tim Flock | (Florida) Marshall Teague | Hudson | 1951 |
| 2 | 1951–02 | (Georgia (U.S. state)) Fonty Flock | (Virginia) Curtis Turner | (Virginia) Curtis Turner | Nash | 1951 |
| 3 | 1951–03 | (Florida) Red Harrelson | (Georgia (U.S. state)) Tim Flock | (Georgia (U.S. state)) Tim Flock | Oldsmobile | 1951 |
| 4 | 1951–04 | (California) Andy Pierce | (Florida) Marshall Teague | (Florida) Marshall Teague | Hudson | 1951 |
| 5 | 1951–05 | (Georgia (U.S. state)) Fonty Flock | (Georgia (U.S. state)) Fonty Flock | (Georgia (U.S. state)) Fonty Flock | Oldsmobile | 1950 |
| 6 | 1951–06 | (Georgia (U.S. state)) Fonty Flock | (Florida) Marshall Teague | (Florida) Marshall Teague | Hudson | 1951 |
| 7 | Wilkes County 150 | (Georgia (U.S. state)) Fonty Flock | (Georgia (U.S. state)) Fonty Flock | (Georgia (U.S. state)) Fonty Flock | Oldsmobile | 1950 |
| 8 | 1951–08 | (Georgia (U.S. state)) Tim Flock | (Virginia) Curtis Turner | (Virginia) Curtis Turner | Oldsmobile | 1950 |
| 9 | Poor Man's 500 | (New York (state)) Bill Rexford | ??? | (Florida) Marshall Teague | Hudson | 1951 |
| 10 | 1951–10 | (Georgia (U.S. state)) Gober Sosebee | ??? | (Georgia (U.S. state)) Tim Flock | Oldsmobile | 1951 |
| 11 | 1951–11 | (Georgia (U.S. state)) Frank Mundy | (Georgia (U.S. state)) Frank Mundy | (Georgia (U.S. state)) Frank Mundy | Studebaker | 1951 |
| 12 | 1951–12 | (Georgia (U.S. state)) Tim Flock | (Virginia) Curtis Turner | (Virginia) Curtis Turner | Oldsmobile | 1951 |
| 13 | 1951–13 | (California) Lou Figaro | (California) Lou Figaro | (California) Lou Figaro | Hudson | 1951 |
| 14 | 1951–14 | (Georgia (U.S. state)) Tim Flock | (Florida) Marshall Teague | (Florida) Marshall Teague | Hudson | 1951 |
| 15 | 1951–15 | (Georgia (U.S. state)) Fonty Flock | ??? | (Georgia (U.S. state)) Fonty Flock | Oldsmobile | 1950 |
| 16 | 1951–16 | (Georgia (U.S. state)) Fonty Flock | (North Carolina) Herb Thomas | (North Carolina) Herb Thomas | Oldsmobile | 1951 |
| 17 | 1951–17 | (Georgia (U.S. state)) Fonty Flock | ??? | (Georgia (U.S. state)) Fonty Flock | Oldsmobile | 1951 |
| 18 | 1951–18 | (Georgia (U.S. state)) Fonty Flock | (Georgia (U.S. state)) Fonty Flock | (North Carolina) Lee Petty | Plymouth | 1951 |
| 19 | 1951–19 | (Georgia (U.S. state)) Fonty Flock | (Georgia (U.S. state)) Fonty Flock | (Georgia (U.S. state)) Fonty Flock | Oldsmobile | 1951 |
| 20 | Motor City 250 | (Florida) Marshall Teague | (Virginia) Curtis Turner | (Kentucky) Tommy Thompson | Chrysler | 1951 |
| 21 | 1951–21 | (Georgia (U.S. state)) Fonty Flock | (Georgia (U.S. state)) Fonty Flock | (Georgia (U.S. state)) Tim Flock | Oldsmobile | 1951 |
| 22 | 1951–22 | (Georgia (U.S. state)) Tim Flock | (Georgia (U.S. state)) Tim Flock | (Georgia (U.S. state)) Tim Flock | Oldsmobile | 1951 |
| 23 | 1951–23 | (Georgia (U.S. state)) Jesse James Taylor | (Georgia (U.S. state)) Bob Flock | (Georgia (U.S. state)) Bob Flock | Oldsmobile | 1951 |
| 24 | Southern 500 | (Georgia (U.S. state)) Frank Mundy | (North Carolina) Herb Thomas | (North Carolina) Herb Thomas | Hudson | 1951 |
| 25 | 1951–25 | (Georgia (U.S. state)) Tim Flock | (Georgia (U.S. state)) Tim Flock | (Georgia (U.S. state)) Tim Flock | Oldsmobile | 1951 |
| 26 | 1951–26 | (Georgia (U.S. state)) Bob Flock | (Georgia (U.S. state)) Jesse James Taylor | (North Carolina) Herb Thomas | Plymouth | 1951 |
| 27 | 1951–27 | (Georgia (U.S. state)) Fonty Flock | (Georgia (U.S. state)) Fonty Flock | (North Carolina) Herb Thomas | Hudson | 1951 |
| 28 | 1951–28 | (Georgia (U.S. state)) Billy Carden | (North Carolina) Herb Thomas | (North Carolina) Herb Thomas | Hudson | 1951 |
| 29 | 1951–29 | (Georgia (U.S. state)) Fonty Flock | (Georgia (U.S. state)) Fonty Flock | (Georgia (U.S. state)) Fonty Flock | Oldsmobile | 1951 |
| 30 | 1951–30 | (Georgia (U.S. state)) Fonty Flock | ??? | (Georgia (U.S. state)) Fonty Flock | Oldsmobile | 1951 |
| 31 | 1951–31 | (North Carolina) Herb Thomas | (Georgia (U.S. state)) Fonty Flock | (North Carolina) Herb Thomas | Hudson | 1951 |
| 32 | 1951–32 | (New Jersey) Neil Cole | (North Carolina) Herb Thomas | (New Jersey) Neil Cole | Oldsmobile | 1950 |
| 33 | 1951–33 | (Georgia (U.S. state)) Tim Flock | (Georgia (U.S. state)) Tim Flock | (Georgia (U.S. state)) Tim Flock | Oldsmobile | 1951 |
| 34 | 1951–34 | (North Carolina) Herb Thomas | (Georgia (U.S. state)) Frank Mundy | (Georgia (U.S. state)) Frank Mundy | Oldsmobile | 1951 |
| 35 | 1951–35 | (California) Dick Rathman | (California) Marvin Burke | (California) Marvin Burke | Mercury | 1950 |
| 36 | Wilkes 200 | (North Carolina) Herb Thomas | (Georgia (U.S. state)) Fonty Flock | (Georgia (U.S. state)) Fonty Flock | Oldsmobile | 1951 |
| 37 | 1951–37 | (North Carolina) Herb Thomas | (California) Danny Weinberg | (California) Danny Weinberg | Studebaker | 1951 |
| 38 | 1951–38 | (North Carolina) Herb Thomas | (North Carolina) Herb Thomas | (North Carolina) Herb Thomas | Hudson | 1951 |
| 39 | 1951–39 | (Georgia (U.S. state)) Frank Mundy | (Georgia (U.S. state)) Tim Flock | (Georgia (U.S. state)) Tim Flock | Hudson | 1951 |
| 40 | 1951–40 | (Georgia (U.S. state)) Fonty Flock | (California) Dick Meyer | (California) Bill Norton | Mercury | 1950 |
| 41 | 1951–41 | (Georgia (U.S. state)) Frank Mundy | (Georgia (U.S. state)) Frank Mundy | (Georgia (U.S. state)) Frank Mundy | Studebaker | 1951 |

=== Drivers' championship ===
(key) Bold - Pole position * – Most laps led.

| Pos. | Driver | Races | | | | | | | | | | | | | | | | | | | | | | | | | | | | | | | | | | | | | | | | | Points |
| Pos. | Driver | DAB | CHA | MOB | GAR | OCC | ARZ | NWS | MAR | CAN | CLM | COL | DAY | GAR | GRI | BAI | PIT | WEA | MON | ALT | DET | TOL | MOR | GRN | DAR | COL | MAC | LAN | CHA | DAY | WIL | OCC | THO | SHI | MAR | OAK | NWS | HAN | JCK | ATL | GAR | MOB | Points |
|---|---|---|---|---|---|---|---|---|---|---|---|---|---|---|---|---|---|---|---|---|---|---|---|---|---|---|---|---|---|---|---|---|---|---|---|---|---|---|---|---|---|---|---|
| 1 | (North Carolina) Herb Thomas | 16 | 4 | 3 | | 7 | 22 | 13 | 4 | 4 | 3 | 4 | 24 | | 11 | 12 | 1* | 3 | 15 | 2 | 57 | 5 | 29 | 6 | 1* | 20 | 1 | 1 | 1* | | 14 | **1** | 26* | | **18** | | **21** | **28** | **1*** | 19 | | 21 | 4208 9/20 |
| 2 | (Georgia (U.S. state)) Fonty Flock | 3 | **20** | 2 | | **1*** | **4** | **1*** | 5 | 3 | 25 | 12 | 4 | | 3 | **1** | **36** | **1** | **14*** | **1*** | 34 | **18** | 30 | 4 | 8 | 10 | 4 | **2*** | | **1*** | **1** | 15 | | | | 11 | 1* | 24 | 3 | | **11** | 4 | 4062 1/4 |
| 3 | (Georgia (U.S. state)) Tim Flock | **2*** | 33 | 1* | | 4 | 3 | 2 | **3** | 2 | 1 | 7 | **3** | | **4** | 20 | 37 | 11 | | | 17 | 1 | **1*** | 2 | 11 | **1*** | 22 | 5 | 11 | | | | 7 | **1*** | | | 4 | | 13 | 1* | | 2 | 3722 1/2 |
| 4 | (North Carolina) Lee Petty | 31 | 2 | 7 | | 9 | 26 | 3 | 6 | 5 | 5 | 20 | 12 | | 6 | 6 | 21 | 25 | 1 | 3 | 13 | 29 | 2 | 7 | 15 | 18 | 21 | 9 | | 4 | | 5 | | | 2 | | 2 | | 7 | 12 | | 16 | 2392 1/4 |
| 5 | (Georgia (U.S. state)) Frank Mundy | | 34 | | 11 | 2 | | 28 | 2 | 7 | 8 | **1*** | 23 | | 7 | 3 | 30 | 4 | 23 | | 50 | 33 | 23 | 13 | **82** | 17 | | | 26 | | | | 21 | | 1* | | | | 5 | **4** | | **1*** | 1963 1/2 |
| 6 | (North Carolina) Buddy Shuman | | | | | | | | | | | | | | | | | | | | | | | 10 | 3 | | | | 6 | | | | | | | | 8 | | 9 | 8 | | 6 | 1368 3/4 |
| 7 | (Georgia (U.S. state)) Jesse James Taylor | | | | | | | | | | | | | | | | | | | | 58 | 7 | | **8** | 2 | 21 | 15* | 15 | 21 | | | | | | | | | | 12 | 22 | | | 1214 |
| 8 | (California) Dick Rathman | | | | 7 | | 28 | | | 9 | | 31 | 2 | | 2 | 2 | 31 | | | | 55 | 25 | 33 | | | | | 3 | | 25 | | | | | | **20** | | | | | | | 1040 |
| 9 | (Florida) Bill Snowden | 8 | | | | | | 26 | | | | 8 | 31 | | | | | 9 | | | | | | 11 | 9 | 9 | | | | | 5 | | | | 4 | | 6 | | 4 | 15 | | | 1009 1/4 |
| 10 | (South Carolina) Joe Eubanks | | | | | | | | | | | 33 | | | | | | 19 | | | 2 | 27 | 26 | | 75 | 27 | 13 | | 14 | | | 3 | | | | | 3 | | 19 | | | | 1005 1/2 |

| Fin | Driver | Pts | St | W | T5 | T10 | Pole | Earnings | Pts | +\- |
|---|---|---|---|---|---|---|---|---|---|---|
| 11 | Lloyd Moore | 996.50 | 22 | 0 | 4 | 8 | 0 | | | |
| 12 | Fireball Roberts | 930.00 | 9 | 0 | 2 | 3 | 0 | | | |
| 13 | Jimmie Lewallen | 874.25 | 12 | 0 | 4 | 8 | 0 | | | |
| 14 | Bob Flock | 869.00 | 17 | 1 | 4 | 9 | 1 | | | |
| 15 | Jim Paschal | 858.50 | 16 | 0 | 4 | 7 | 0 | | | |
| 16 | Bill Blair | 840.00 | 18 | 0 | 4 | 7 | 0 | | | |
| 17 | Gober Sosebee | 784.00 | 10 | 0 | 4 | 5 | 1 | | | |
| 18 | Erick Erickson | 723.50 | 12 | 0 | 4 | 6 | 0 | | | |
| 19 | Tommy Thompson | 755.00 | 5 | 1 | 1 | 2 | 0 | | | |
| 20 | Donald Thomas | 743.50 | 17 | 0 | 4 | 8 | 0 | | | |
| 21 | Johnny Mantz | 725.00 | 6 | 0 | 2 | 4 | 0 | | | |
| 22 | Lou Figaro | 684.25 | 13 | 1 | 3 | 4 | 1 | | | |
| 23 | Buck Baker | 644.50 | 11 | 0 | 4 | 5 | 0 | | | |
| 24 | Dick Meyer | 626.50 | 6 | 0 | 3 | 4 | 0 | | | |
| 25 | Harold Kite | 625.00 | 2 | 0 | 0 | 1 | 0 | | | |
| 26 | Billy Carden | 509.75 | 11 | 0 | 2 | 5 | 1 | | | |
| 27 | Jimmy Florian | 462.50 | 9 | 0 | 2 | 5 | 0 | | | |
| 28 | Jim Fiebelkorn | 455.00 | 17 | 0 | 1 | 4 | 0 | | | |
| 29 | Ronnie Kohler | 432.00 | 5 | 0 | 2 | 3 | 0 | | | |
| 30 | Danny Weinberg | 423.50 | 6 | 1 | 2 | 3 | 0 | | | |
| 31 | Pappy Hough | 423.00 | 9 | 0 | 1 | 4 | 0 | | | |
| 32 | Woody Brown | 421.00 | 3 | 0 | 2 | 2 | 0 | | | |
| 33 | Neil Cole | 382.00 | 5 | 1 | 3 | 3 | 1 | | | |
| 34 | Paul Newkirk | 375.00 | 1 | 0 | 1 | 1 | 0 | | | |
| 35 | John McGinley | 372.50 | 6 | 0 | 2 | 2 | 0 | | | |
| 36 | Marvin Panch | 371.50 | 3 | 0 | 1 | 2 | 0 | | | |
| 37 | Oda Greene | 366.50 | 6 | 0 | 2 | 3 | 0 | | | |
| 38 | Jack Goodwin | 362.50 | 3 | 0 | 0 | 1 | 0 | | | |
| 39 | Jack Smith | 360.50 | 7 | 0 | 2 | 2 | 0 | | | |
| 40 | Robert Caswell | 350.00 | 3 | 0 | 1 | 1 | 0 | | | |
| 41 | Lloyd Dane | 323.50 | 6 | 0 | 2 | 3 | 0 | | | |
| 42 | Cotton Owens | 312.50 | 5 | 0 | 1 | 3 | 0 | | | |
| 43 | Fred Steinbroner | 306.50 | 6 | 0 | 2 | 3 | 0 | | | |
| 44 | Ewell Weddle | 293.50 | 7 | 0 | 0 | 2 | 0 | | | |
| 45 | George Seeger | 278.00 | 10 | 0 | 1 | 2 | 0 | | | |
| 46 | Sam Hawks | 262.50 | 3 | 0 | 1 | 1 | 0 | | | |
| 47 | Don Bailey | 239.50 | 10 | 0 | 1 | 2 | 0 | | | |
| 48 | Bud Farrell | 227.50 | 5 | 0 | 1 | 2 | 0 | | | |
| 49 | Bud Riley | 262.50 | 8 | 0 | 1 | 2 | 0 | | | |
| 50 | Fred Bince | 224.00 | 5 | 0 | 1 | 2 | 0 | | | |
| 51 | Dick Eagan | 220.00 | 3 | 0 | 1 | 2 | 0 | | | |
| 52 | Red Duvall | 213.00 | 2 | 0 | 1 | 2 | 0 | | | |
| 53 | Augie Walackas | 212.00 | 4 | 0 | 1 | 3 | 0 | | | |
| 54 | Charles Gattalia | 208.00 | 6 | 0 | 1 | 1 | 0 | | | |
| 55 | Bill Holland | 204.00 | 7 | 0 | 1 | 2 | 0 | | | |
| 56 | Jim Reed | 187.00 | 4 | 0 | 1 | 1 | 0 | | | |
| 57 | Shorty York | 185.00 | 5 | 0 | 1 | 1 | 0 | | | |
| 58 | Chuck Meekins | 184.00 | 6 | 0 | 1 | 1 | 0 | | | |
| 59 | Billy Myers | 176.50 | 8 | 0 | 1 | 2 | 0 | | | |
| 60 | Bub King | 165.00 | 9 | 0 | 0 | 2 | 0 | | | |
| 61 | Ed Samples | 164.25 | 4 | 0 | 0 | 2 | 0 | | | |
| 62 | Pap White | 158.00 | 1 | 0 | 0 | 1 | 0 | | | |
| 63 | Don Oldenberg | 147.50 | 3 | 0 | 1 | 2 | 0 | | | |
| 64 | Jim Delaney | 144.50 | 7 | 0 | 1 | 2 | 0 | | | |
| 65 | Bill Miller | 144.00 | 6 | 0 | 0 | 2 | 0 | | | |
| 66 | John DuBoise | 143.00 | 3 | 0 | 1 | 1 | 0 | | | |
| 67 | Bill Osborne | 140.00 | 1 | 0 | 1 | 1 | 0 | | | |
| 68 | Bob Dietrich | 140.00 | 2 | 0 | 0 | 2 | 0 | | | |
| 69 | Frank Luptow | 136.00 | 4 | 0 | 1 | 1 | 0 | | | |
| 70 | Jerry Morese | 136.00 | 2 | 0 | 1 | 1 | 0 | | | |
| 71 | Jimmy Ayers | 136.00 | 7 | 0 | 0 | 5 | 0 | | | |
| 72 | Bill Rexford | 130.00 | 11 | 0 | 0 | 1 | 1 | | | |
| 73 | Dell Pearson | 123.50 | 8 | 0 | 1 | 3 | 0 | | | |
| 74 | Reino Tulonen | 121.00 | 4 | 0 | 1 | 1 | 0 | | | |
| 75 | Speedy Thompson | 120.00 | 3 | 0 | 1 | 1 | 0 | | | |
| 76 | Tom Jerris | | 1 | 0 | 1 | 1 | 0 | | | |
| 77 | Les Snow | | 2 | 0 | 0 | 1 | 0 | | | |
| 78 | Coleman Lawrence | | 6 | 0 | 0 | 2 | 0 | | | |
| 79 | Jack Reynolds | | 2 | 0 | 0 | 1 | 0 | | | |
| 80 | Jack Flynn | | 2 | 0 | 0 | 1 | 0 | | | |
| 81 | Bill Ledbetter | | 1 | 0 | 0 | 1 | 0 | | | |
| 82 | Claude Wallington | | 2 | 0 | 0 | 1 | 0 | | | |
| 83 | Tommy Moon | | 2 | 0 | 0 | 1 | 0 | | | |
| 84 | Hap Jones | | 1 | 0 | 0 | 1 | 0 | | | |
| 84 | Lamar Crabtree | | 1 | 0 | 0 | 1 | 0 | | | |
| 86 | Cal Johnson | | 2 | 0 | 0 | 2 | 0 | | | |
| 87 | Danny Letner | | 4 | 0 | 0 | 2 | 0 | | | |
| 88 | Ed Benedict | | 6 | 0 | 0 | 1 | 0 | | | |
| 89 | Glenn Dunaway | | 5 | 0 | 0 | 2 | 0 | | | |
| 90 | Slick Smith | | 4 | 0 | 0 | 0 | 0 | | | |
| 102 | Freddie Farmer | | 5 | 0 | 0 | 1 | 0 | | | |
| 108 | Quinton Daniels | | 7 | 0 | 0 | 1 | 0 | | | |
| 131 | Iggy Katona | | 5 | 0 | 0 | 0 | 0 | | | |
| 138 | Tommy Lane | | 2 | 0 | 0 | 1 | 0 | | | |
| 139 | Bill Braun | | 1 | 0 | 0 | 1 | 0 | | | |
| 147 | Harold Mays | | 1 | 0 | 0 | 0 | 0 | | | |
| 152 | Tommie Elliott | | 2 | 0 | 0 | 0 | 0 | | | |
| 160 | James Ellis | | 1 | 0 | 0 | 0 | 0 | | | |
| 164 | Bob Myers | | 1 | 0 | 0 | 0 | 0 | | | |
| 181 | Gene Tapia | | 3 | 0 | 0 | 0 | 0 | | | |
| 191 | Paul Pettit | | 4 | 0 | 0 | 0 | 0 | | | |
| 192 | Johnny Grubb | | 1 | 0 | 0 | 0 | 0 | | | |
| 195 | Jesse White | | 1 | 0 | 0 | 0 | 0 | | | |
| 203 | Ray Erickson | | 3 | 0 | 0 | 0 | 0 | | | |
| 208 | Bobby Myers | | 2 | 0 | 0 | 0 | 0 | | | |
| 209 | Maudis Brissette | | 1 | 0 | 0 | 0 | 0 | | | |
| 209 | Charles Kleber | | 1 | 0 | 0 | 0 | 0 | | | |
| 219 | Gus Linder | | 1 | 0 | 0 | 0 | 0 | | | |
| 224 | Joe Bellinato | | 1 | 0 | 0 | 0 | 0 | | | |
| 237 | Coleman Grant | | 1 | 0 | 0 | 0 | 0 | | | |
| | Dave Reiley | | 1 | 0 | 0 | 0 | 0 | | | |
| | Bob Read | | 1 | 0 | 0 | 0 | 0 | | | |
| | Jim Rathmann | | 1 | 0 | 0 | 0 | 0 | | | |
| | Ray Pruitt | | 2 | 0 | 0 | 0 | 0 | | | |
| | Bob Pronger | | 1 | 0 | 0 | 0 | 0 | | | |
| | Bob Prince | | 1 | 0 | 0 | 0 | 0 | | | |
| | Lloyd Porter | | 2 | 0 | 0 | 0 | 0 | | | |
| | Junior Pooler | | 1 | 0 | 0 | 0 | 0 | | | |
| | Art Plas | | 1 | 0 | 0 | 0 | 0 | | | |
| | Andy Pierce | | 4 | 0 | 0 | 0 | 1 | | | |
| | Paul Parks | | 1 | 0 | 0 | 0 | 0 | | | |
| | Pete Page | | 1 | 0 | 0 | 0 | 0 | | | |
| | Sammy Packard | | 2 | 0 | 0 | 0 | 0 | | | |
| | Frank Oviado | | 1 | 0 | 0 | 0 | 0 | | | |
| | Bill Norton | | 3 | 1 | 2 | 3 | 0 | | | |
| | Bill Remaly | | 1 | 0 | 0 | 0 | 0 | | | |
| | Bob Reuther | | 1 | 0 | 0 | 0 | 0 | | | |
| | Dick Richter | | 1 | 0 | 0 | 0 | 0 | | | |
| | Leon Sales | | 4 | 0 | 0 | 2 | 0 | | | |
| | Buckie Sager | | 1 | 0 | 0 | 0 | 0 | | | |
| | Red Ryder | | 1 | 0 | 0 | 0 | 0 | | | |
| | Jerry Russo | | 1 | 0 | 0 | 0 | 0 | | | |
| | Hank Russ | | 1 | 0 | 0 | 0 | 0 | | | |
| | Fred Russell | | 1 | 0 | 0 | 1 | 0 | | | |
| | Rusty Rushton | | 2 | 0 | 0 | 0 | 0 | | | |
| | Dan Rush | | 1 | 0 | 0 | 0 | 0 | | | |
| | Don Rudolph | | 1 | 0 | 0 | 0 | 0 | | | |
| | Jim Ross | | 2 | 0 | 0 | 0 | 0 | | | |
| | Ed Rooney | | 1 | 0 | 0 | 0 | 0 | | | |
| | Jim Romine | | 3 | 0 | 0 | 1 | 0 | | | |
| | Joe Rogers | | 1 | 0 | 0 | 0 | 0 | | | |
| | Neil Roberts | | 1 | 0 | 0 | 0 | 0 | | | |
| | Bill Schade | | 2 | 0 | 0 | 0 | 0 | | | |
| | Stan Noble | | 3 | 0 | 0 | 0 | 0 | | | |
| | Jim Mayes | | 1 | 0 | 0 | 0 | 0 | | | |
| | Bob Matson | | 1 | 0 | 0 | 0 | 0 | | | |
| | Ed Massey | | 3 | 0 | 0 | 1 | 0 | | | |
| | Otis Martin | | 2 | 0 | 0 | 0 | 0 | | | |
| | Bill Majot | | 3 | 0 | 0 | 0 | 0 | | | |
| | Chuck Mahoney | | 1 | 0 | 0 | 1 | 0 | | | |
| | Sandy Lynch | | 2 | 0 | 0 | 0 | 0 | | | |
| | Louis Luther | | 1 | 0 | 0 | 0 | 0 | | | |
| | Harold Lucas | | 1 | 0 | 0 | 0 | 0 | | | |
| | Jimmy Longo | | 1 | 0 | 0 | 0 | 0 | | | |
| | Mike Little | | 1 | 0 | 0 | 0 | 0 | | | |
| | Jim Little | | 1 | 0 | 0 | 1 | 0 | | | |
| | Dick Linder | | 10 | 0 | 0 | 2 | 0 | | | |
| | Bill Lillenthal | | 1 | 0 | 0 | 0 | 0 | | | |
| | Norm McCarthy | | 3 | 0 | 0 | 1 | 0 | | | |
| | Jack McClure | | 2 | 0 | 0 | 0 | 0 | | | |
| | Hershel McGriff | | 3 | 0 | 1 | 1 | 0 | | | |
| | Nick Nicolette | | 1 | 0 | 0 | 0 | 0 | | | |
| | Earl Moss | | 5 | 0 | 0 | 1 | 0 | | | |
| | Fred Moore | | 1 | 0 | 0 | 0 | 0 | | | |
| | Charles Moore | | 1 | 0 | 0 | 0 | 0 | | | |
| | Bob Moore | | 2 | 0 | 0 | 0 | 0 | | | |
| | Dick Moffitt | | 4 | 0 | 0 | 2 | 0 | | | |
| | Clyde Minter | | 6 | 0 | 0 | 1 | 0 | | | |
| | V.E. Miller | | 1 | 0 | 0 | 0 | 0 | | | |
| | Jim Miller | | 1 | 0 | 0 | 0 | 0 | | | |
| | Al Miller | | 1 | 0 | 0 | 0 | 0 | | | |
| | Jim Metzler | | 1 | 0 | 0 | 0 | 0 | | | |
| | Joe Merola | | 4 | 0 | 0 | 1 | 0 | | | |
| | Tommy Melvin | | 3 | 0 | 0 | 0 | 0 | | | |
| | Don McLeish | | 1 | 0 | 0 | 0 | 0 | | | |
| | Ralph Liguori | | 1 | 0 | 0 | 0 | 0 | | | |
| | Frankie Schneider | | 1 | 0 | 0 | 0 | 0 | | | |
| | Johnny Yountz | | 1 | 0 | 0 | 0 | 0 | | | |
| | Jimmy Warden | | 1 | 0 | 0 | 0 | 0 | | | |
| | Nook Walters | | 2 | 0 | 0 | 0 | 0 | | | |
| | Bob Walters | | 6 | 0 | 0 | 0 | 0 | | | |
| | Guy Waller | | 1 | 0 | 0 | 0 | 0 | | | |
| | Murrace Walker | | 1 | 0 | 0 | 0 | 0 | | | |
| | Pat Wade | | 1 | 0 | 0 | 0 | 0 | | | |
| | Jack Wade | | 2 | 0 | 0 | 0 | 0 | | | |
| | Lou Volk | | 1 | 0 | 0 | 0 | 0 | | | |
| | Curtis Turner | | 12 | 3 | 3 | 5 | 0 | | | |
| | Herb Trimble | | 2 | 0 | 0 | 1 | 0 | | | |
| | Frank Travers | | 1 | 0 | 0 | 0 | 0 | | | |
| | Leonard Tippett | | 8 | 0 | 1 | 2 | 0 | | | |
| | Billy Tibbert | | 2 | 0 | 0 | 0 | 0 | | | |
| | Ray Throckmorton | | 1 | 0 | 0 | 0 | 0 | | | |
| | James Ward | | 1 | 0 | 0 | 0 | 0 | | | |
| | Gayle Warren | | 3 | 0 | 0 | 0 | 0 | | | |
| | Marshall Weatherly | | 4 | 0 | 0 | 0 | 0 | | | |
| | Ernie Yorton | | 1 | 0 | 0 | 1 | 0 | | | |
| | Whitey Worton | | 1 | 0 | 0 | 0 | 0 | | | |
| | Cliff Woodson | | 1 | 0 | 0 | 0 | 0 | | | |
| | Johnny Wohlfiel | | 1 | 0 | 0 | 0 | 0 | | | |
| | Doug Wimpy | | 1 | 0 | 0 | 0 | 0 | | | |
| | Jerry Wimbish | | 2 | 0 | 0 | 1 | 0 | | | |
| | Elmer Wilson | | 3 | 0 | 0 | 0 | 0 | | | |
| | Dale Williams | | 1 | 0 | 0 | 1 | 0 | | | |
| | Felix Wilkes | | 2 | 0 | 0 | 0 | 0 | | | |
| | Bill Widenhouse | | 4 | 0 | 0 | 0 | 0 | | | |
| | Jack White | | 4 | 0 | 0 | 0 | 0 | | | |
| | J.C. White | | 4 | 0 | 0 | 0 | 0 | | | |
| | Bob White | | 1 | 0 | 0 | 0 | 0 | | | |
| | Tommy Wells | | 3 | 0 | 0 | 0 | 0 | | | |
| | Sam Thompson | | 1 | 0 | 0 | 0 | 0 | | | |
| | Roscoe Thompson | | 3 | 0 | 0 | 0 | 0 | | | |
| | Walt Sprague | | 8 | 0 | 0 | 3 | 0 | | | |
| | Joe Sommers | | 1 | 0 | 0 | 1 | 0 | | | |
| | John Soares | | 1 | 0 | 0 | 1 | 0 | | | |
| | Ruel Smith | | 1 | 0 | 0 | 0 | 0 | | | |
| | Perry Smith | | 1 | 0 | 1 | 1 | 0 | | | |
| | Barney Smith | | 2 | 0 | 0 | 0 | 0 | | | |
| | Joe Skovron | | 1 | 0 | 0 | 0 | 0 | | | |
| | Leo Sigman | | 2 | 0 | 0 | 0 | 0 | | | |
| | James Shields | | 1 | 0 | 0 | 0 | 0 | | | |
| | Eddie Sheeler | | 2 | 0 | 0 | 0 | 0 | | | |
| | Bob Shaw | | 1 | 0 | 0 | 0 | 0 | | | |
| | Lyle Scott | | 2 | 0 | 0 | 1 | 0 | | | |
| | Harry Scott | | 1 | 0 | 0 | 1 | 0 | | | |
| | Gwyn Staley | | 2 | 0 | 0 | 0 | 0 | | | |
| | Bill Stammer | | 4 | 0 | 0 | 2 | 0 | | | |
| | Paul Stanley | | 2 | 0 | 0 | 0 | 0 | | | |
| | Ray Thompson | | 1 | 0 | 0 | 0 | 0 | | | |
| | Johnny Thompson | | 2 | 0 | 0 | 0 | 0 | | | |
| | Jimmy Thompson | | 3 | 0 | 0 | 0 | 0 | | | |
| | Fred Thompson | | 1 | 0 | 0 | 0 | 0 | | | |
| | Rod Therrian | | 1 | 0 | 0 | 0 | 0 | | | |
| | Ted Tedrow | | 1 | 0 | 0 | 0 | 0 | | | |
| | Marshall Teague | | 15 | 5 | 7 | 9 | 2 | | | |
| | Ted Swaim | | 2 | 0 | 0 | 0 | 0 | | | |
| | Tom Suligoy | | 1 | 0 | 0 | 0 | 0 | | | |
| | Harold Strapp | | 1 | 0 | 0 | 0 | 0 | | | |
| | Dick Stone | | 4 | 0 | 0 | 1 | 0 | | | |
| | Chuck Stimus | | 1 | 0 | 0 | 1 | 0 | | | |
| | Bill Stickler | | 3 | 0 | 0 | 0 | 0 | | | |
| | Tommy Stenger | | 1 | 0 | 0 | 0 | 0 | | | |
| | Lee Schneider | | 1 | 0 | 0 | 0 | 0 | | | |
| | Wimpy Ervin | | 4 | 0 | 0 | 1 | 0 | | | |
| | Pepper Cunningham | | 4 | 0 | 0 | 0 | 0 | | | |
| | Tony Correnti | | 1 | 0 | 0 | 0 | 0 | | | |
| | Lee Connell | | 1 | 0 | 0 | 0 | 0 | | | |
| | Gene Comstock | | 4 | 0 | 0 | 0 | 0 | | | |
| | Leland Colvin | | 5 | 0 | 0 | 2 | 0 | | | |
| | Earl Coleman | | 1 | 0 | 0 | 0 | 0 | | | |
| | Hal Cole | | 3 | 0 | 0 | 1 | 0 | | | |
| | Tommy Coates | | 1 | 0 | 0 | 0 | 0 | | | |
| | June Cleveland | | 1 | 0 | 0 | 0 | 0 | | | |
| | George Clark | | 1 | 0 | 0 | 0 | 0 | | | |
| | Buck Clardy | | 1 | 0 | 0 | 0 | 0 | | | |
| | Bill Cintia | | 1 | 0 | 0 | 1 | 0 | | | |
| | Bill Cheesbourg | | 1 | 0 | 0 | 0 | 0 | | | |
| | Ray Chase | | 6 | 0 | 0 | 0 | 0 | | | |
| | Steve Dabb | | 1 | 0 | 0 | 0 | 0 | | | |
| | Dan Daniels | | 2 | 0 | 0 | 0 | 0 | | | |
| | Gene Darragh | | 1 | 0 | 0 | 0 | 0 | | | |
| | Mike Ernest | | 1 | 0 | 0 | 0 | 0 | | | |
| | Bud Erb | | 3 | 0 | 0 | 0 | 0 | | | |
| | Don Eggett | | 7 | 0 | 0 | 2 | 0 | | | |
| | Carson Dyer | | 3 | 0 | 0 | 0 | 0 | | | |
| | Ray Duhigg | | 6 | 0 | 0 | 0 | 0 | | | |
| | Ben Dixon | | 2 | 0 | 0 | 0 | 0 | | | |
| | Sam DiRusso | | 1 | 0 | 0 | 0 | 0 | | | |
| | C.H. Dingler | | 3 | 0 | 0 | 0 | 0 | | | |
| | Rocky DiNatale | | 1 | 0 | 0 | 0 | 0 | | | |
| | Ernie Dietzman | | 1 | 0 | 0 | 0 | 0 | | | |
| | Oliver Dial | | 2 | 0 | 0 | 0 | 0 | | | |
| | Lloyd Dennis | | 1 | 0 | 0 | 0 | 0 | | | |
| | O.A. Dean | | 1 | 0 | 0 | 0 | 0 | | | |
| | Walt Davis | | 2 | 0 | 0 | 2 | 0 | | | |
| | Bill Champion | | 1 | 0 | 0 | 1 | 0 | | | |
| | Ted Chamberlain | | 3 | 0 | 0 | 1 | 0 | | | |
| | Les Bomar | | 4 | 0 | 0 | 0 | 0 | | | |
| | Pug Blalock | | 3 | 0 | 0 | 1 | 0 | | | |
| | Sonny Black | | 4 | 0 | 0 | 2 | 0 | | | |
| | Don Black | | 1 | 0 | 0 | 0 | 0 | | | |
| | Leo Breithaupt | | 1 | 0 | 0 | 1 | 0 | | | |
| | John Barker | | 7 | 0 | 0 | 0 | 0 | | | |
| | Buck Baity | | 1 | 0 | 0 | 0 | 0 | | | |
| | Dick Bailey | | 2 | 0 | 0 | 0 | 0 | | | |
| | Paul Austin | | 1 | 0 | 0 | 0 | 0 | | | |
| | Nelson Applegate | | 3 | 0 | 0 | 0 | 0 | | | |
| | Jess Anderson | | 1 | 0 | 0 | 0 | 0 | | | |
| | Fuzzy Anderson | | 1 | 0 | 0 | 0 | 0 | | | |
| | Eddie Anderson | | 5 | 0 | 0 | 0 | 0 | | | |
| | Dave Anderson | | 1 | 0 | 0 | 0 | 0 | | | |
| | Bobby Booth | | 3 | 0 | 0 | 0 | 0 | | | |
| | Victor Brunzell | | 1 | 0 | 0 | 0 | 0 | | | |
| | Willard Brooks | | 1 | 0 | 0 | 0 | 0 | | | |
| | George Cavanna | | 1 | 0 | 0 | 0 | 0 | | | |
| | Joe Carver | | 1 | 0 | 0 | 0 | 0 | | | |
| | Jerry Carver | | 2 | 0 | 0 | 0 | 0 | | | |
| | Bob Carpenter | | 1 | 0 | 0 | 0 | 0 | | | |
| | Frank Carlin | | 1 | 0 | 0 | 0 | 0 | | | |
| | Wally Campbell | | 5 | 0 | 0 | 0 | 0 | | | |
| | Leo Caldwell | | 1 | 0 | 0 | 0 | 0 | | | |
| | Red Byron | | 5 | 0 | 1 | 2 | 0 | | | |
| | Jim Byrd | | 3 | 0 | 0 | 1 | 0 | | | |
| | Marvin Burke | | 1 | 1 | 1 | 1 | 0 | | | |
| | Hully Bunn | | 1 | 0 | 0 | 0 | 0 | | | |
| | Julian Buesink | | 1 | 0 | 0 | 0 | 0 | | | |
| | Herschel Buchanan | | 1 | 0 | 0 | 0 | 0 | | | |
| | Len Brown | | 1 | 0 | 0 | 0 | 0 | | | |
| | Weldon Adams | | 11 | 0 | 0 | 2 | 0 | | | |
| | Fred Faber | | 1 | 0 | 0 | 0 | 0 | | | |
| | Eddie Lenz | | 1 | 0 | 0 | 0 | 0 | | | |
| | Bob Johnson | | 1 | 0 | 0 | 0 | 0 | | | |
| | Fran Jischke | | 1 | 0 | 0 | 0 | 0 | | | |
| | Joe Jernigan | | 2 | 0 | 0 | 0 | 0 | | | |
| | Bob Jeffries | | 2 | 0 | 0 | 0 | 0 | | | |
| | Ray Janelle | | 1 | 0 | 0 | 0 | 0 | | | |
| | Bob James | | 1 | 0 | 0 | 0 | 0 | | | |
| | Al Jacobs | | 4 | 0 | 0 | 0 | 0 | | | |
| | Burt Jackson | | 1 | 0 | 0 | 1 | 0 | | | |
| | Jimmy Ingram | | 1 | 0 | 0 | 0 | 0 | | | |
| | Curtis Hunt | | 1 | 0 | 0 | 0 | 0 | | | |
| | Dave Humphrey | | 1 | 0 | 0 | 0 | 0 | | | |
| | Frank Holzhauer | | 1 | 0 | 0 | 0 | 0 | | | |
| | Bill Holluck | | 1 | 0 | 0 | 0 | 0 | | | |
| | Jack Holloway | | 3 | 0 | 0 | 0 | 0 | | | |
| | Owen Jones | | 2 | 0 | 0 | 0 | 0 | | | |
| | Bill Joslin | | 4 | 0 | 0 | 0 | 0 | | | |
| | Claude Joyce | | 1 | 0 | 0 | 0 | 0 | | | |
| | Irv Leitch | | 1 | 0 | 0 | 0 | 0 | | | |
| | Hank Lee | | 1 | 0 | 0 | 0 | 0 | | | |
| | Dawson Lechlider | | 4 | 0 | 0 | 0 | 0 | | | |
| | Bill Lawrence | | 1 | 0 | 0 | 0 | 0 | | | |
| | Eddie LaRue | | 1 | 0 | 0 | 0 | 0 | | | |
| | Furman Lancaster | | 1 | 0 | 0 | 1 | 0 | | | |
| | Ben Lalomia | | 1 | 0 | 0 | 0 | 0 | | | |
| | Bill LaGrance | | 1 | 0 | 0 | 0 | 0 | | | |
| | Art Knoll | | 1 | 0 | 0 | 0 | 0 | | | |
| | Ken Klutz | | 1 | 0 | 0 | 0 | 0 | | | |
| | Mike Klapak | | 5 | 0 | 0 | 1 | 0 | | | |
| | Al King | | 1 | 0 | 0 | 0 | 0 | | | |
| | Tip R. Key | | 1 | 0 | 0 | 0 | 0 | | | |
| | Jack Kabat | | 1 | 0 | 0 | 0 | 0 | | | |
| | Rudy Hires | | 1 | 0 | 0 | 0 | 0 | | | |
| | Ray Hill | | 1 | 0 | 0 | 0 | 0 | | | |
| | Herb Gott | | 1 | 0 | 0 | 0 | 0 | | | |
| | Frank Gise | | 2 | 0 | 0 | 1 | 0 | | | |
| | Charles Gillman | | 2 | 0 | 0 | 1 | 0 | | | |
| | Tom Gifford | | 1 | 0 | 0 | 0 | 0 | | | |
| | Jack Gaynor | | 1 | 0 | 0 | 0 | 0 | | | |
| | Nick Garin | | 1 | 0 | 0 | 0 | 0 | | | |
| | Dudley Froy | | 2 | 0 | 0 | 0 | 0 | | | |
| | Roy Forsythe | | 1 | 0 | 0 | 0 | 0 | | | |
| | Jack Fleming | | 1 | 0 | 0 | 0 | 0 | | | |
| | Bill Flatcher | | 1 | 0 | 0 | 0 | 0 | | | |
| | Walt Flanders | | 1 | 0 | 0 | 0 | 0 | | | |
| | Pat Flaherty | | 1 | 0 | 0 | 0 | 0 | | | |
| | Cal Fisher | | 1 | 0 | 0 | 0 | 0 | | | |
| | Wade Fields | | 6 | 0 | 0 | 0 | 0 | | | |
| | Bob Green | | 1 | 0 | 0 | 0 | 0 | | | |
| | Bob Greer | | 4 | 0 | 0 | 0 | 0 | | | |
| | Ben Gregory | | 1 | 0 | 0 | 0 | 0 | | | |
| | Russ Hepler | | 1 | 0 | 0 | 1 | 0 | | | |
| | Buddy Helms | | 1 | 0 | 0 | 0 | 0 | | | |
| | Allen Heath | | 3 | 0 | 0 | 0 | 0 | | | |
| | Red Harvey | | 1 | 0 | 0 | 1 | 0 | | | |
| | Gordon Harvey | | 1 | 0 | 0 | 0 | 0 | | | |
| | Walt Hartman | | 3 | 0 | 0 | 0 | 0 | | | |
| | Jim Hart | | 1 | 0 | 0 | 0 | 0 | | | |
| | Bill Harrison | | 1 | 0 | 0 | 0 | 0 | | | |
| | Red Harrelson | | 1 | 0 | 0 | 0 | 0 | | | |
| | Leon Harrell | | 1 | 0 | 0 | 0 | 0 | | | |
| | J.E. Hardie | | 1 | 0 | 0 | 0 | 0 | | | |
| | Richard Hancock | | 1 | 0 | 0 | 0 | 0 | | | |
| | Alton Haddock | | 2 | 0 | 0 | 1 | 0 | | | |
| | Jerry Groh | | 2 | 0 | 0 | 0 | 0 | | | |
| | Len Fanelli | | 1 | 0 | 0 | 0 | 0 | | | |
| | Bill Amberg | | 1 | 0 | 0 | 0 | 0 | | | |
