= Marshall Teague (racing driver) =

American racing driver (1921–1959)

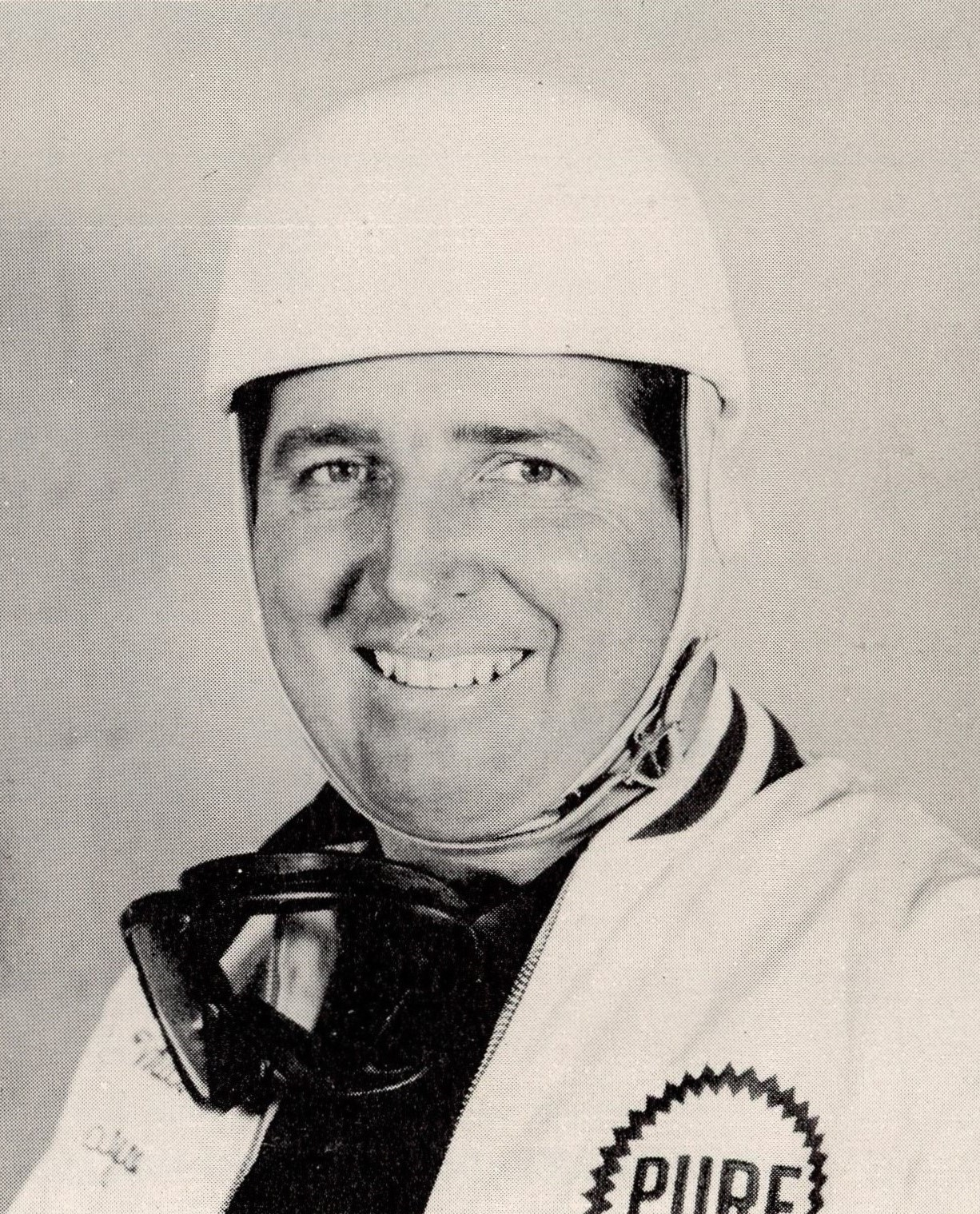
- Teague, circa 1957
- Born: Marshall Pleasant Teague; February 22, 1921 Daytona Beach, Florida, U.S.
- Died: February 11, 1959 (aged 37) Daytona Beach, Florida, U.S.

Championship titles
- AAA Stock Car (1952, 1954); Major victories NASCAR Daytona Beach (1951, 1952)

Awards
- NASCAR’s 50 Greatest Drivers (1998); NASCAR's 75 Greatest Drivers (2023)

AAA/USAC Stock Car career
- Years active: 1952–1958
- Championships: 2
- Best finish: 1st in 1952, 1954

NASCAR Cup Series career
- 23 races run over 4 years
- Best finish: 62nd (1949)
- First race: 1949 Race 2 (Daytona Beach)
- Last race: 1952 Race 6 (Columbia)
- First win: 1951 Race 1 (Daytona Beach)
- Last win: 1952 Race 3 (Speedway Park)
Wins	Top tens	Poles
7	11	2

Champ Car career
- 2 races run over 5 years
- Best finish: 18th (1957)
- First race: 1953 Indianapolis 500 (Indianapolis)
- Last race: 1957 Indianapolis 500 (Indianapolis)
Wins	Podiums	Poles
0	0	0

Formula One World Championship career
- Active years: 1953–1954, 1956–1958
- Team(s): Kurtis Kraft, Kuzma
- Entries: 5 (3 starts)
- Championships: 0
- Wins: 0
- Podiums: 0
- Career points: 0
- Pole positions: 0
- Fastest laps: 0
- First entry: 1953 Indianapolis 500
- Last entry: 1958 Indianapolis 500

Marshall Pleasant Teague (February 22, 1921 – February 11, 1959) was an American race car driver nicknamed by NASCAR fans as the "King of the Beach" for his performances at the Daytona Beach Road Course.

Teague walked into fellow Daytona Beach resident Smokey Yunick's "Best Damned Garage in Town", and launched Yunick's NASCAR mechanic career.

== Career ==
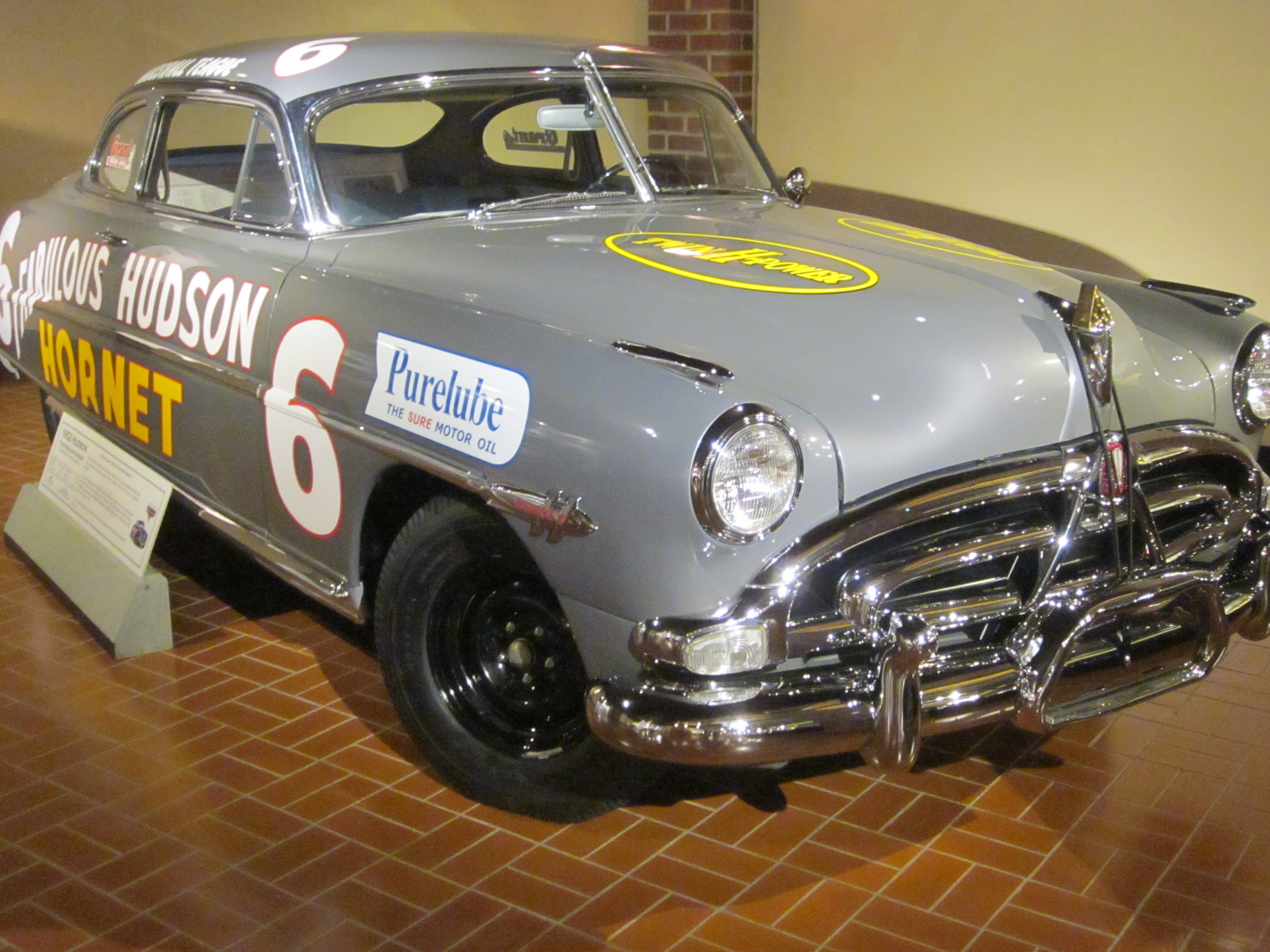
Marshall Teague restored Hudson Hornet

Teague competed in 23 NASCAR Grand National Series races from 1949 to 1952, winning seven of them.

Teague approached the Hudson Motor Car Company by traveling to Michigan and visiting the automaker's factory without an appointment. By the end of his visit, Hudson virtually assured Teague of corporate support and cars, with the relationship formalized shortly after his visit. This "is generally regarded as the first stock car racing team backed by a Detroit auto manufacturer."

During the 1951 and 1952 racing seasons, Teague was a member of the Hudson Motors team and driving what were called the "Fabulous Hudson Hornet" stock cars.

Teague was also instrumental in helping Hudson tune the 308 cu in (5.0 L) straight-6 powered Hudson Hornet to its maximum stock capability. When combined with the car's light weight and low center of gravity, the Hornet allowed Teague and the other Hudson drivers to dominate stock car racing from 1951 through 1954, consistently beating out other drivers in cars powered by larger, more modern engines. Smokey Yunick and Teague won 27 of 34 events in major stock car events.

In 1953, Teague dropped out of NASCAR following a dispute with NASCAR founder Bill France Sr. and went to the AAA and USAC racing circuits.

The Indianapolis 500 was part of the FIA World Championship from 1950 through 1960. Drivers competing at Indy during those years were credited with World Championship points and participation. Teague participated in three World Championship races, but scored no World Championship points.

== Death ==
Driving a reconfigured Indy car at the newly opened Daytona International Speedway, Teague died while attempting to break the closed course speed record, which had been established by Tony Bettenhausen in qualifying for the 1957 Race of Two Worlds at about 177 mph. Teague was conducting test sessions in preparation for the April start of the 1959 USAC Championship Car season, piloting a "Sumar Special" streamliner, a Kurtis Kraft chassis with a 270 c.i. Meyer-Drake Offenhauser engine, streamlined fenders, and a canopy enclosing the driver, thus being classified as Formula Libre.

On February 9, 1959, Teague, clocked at 171.821 mph (276.5 km/h), markedly improved Ed Elisian's unofficial 148-mph-one-lap record for an American race track, which had been set in preparation for the 1958 Indianapolis 500.

The next day, the left rear tire was cut as a result of running over a foreign object, which forced Teague to pit.

Teague was trying to go even faster on February 11, 1959, 11 days before the first Daytona 500. "Teague pushed the speed envelope in the high-powered Sumar Special streamliner – to an estimated 140 mph (230 km/h)." His car spun and flipped through the third turn and Teague was thrown, seat and all, from his car. He died nearly instantly, 11 days shy of his 38th birthday.

== Legacy ==
Teague, along with his No. 6 Fabulous Hudson Hornet, was one of the primary inspirations for Doc Hudson in the film Cars.

== Awards and honors ==
- AAA Stock Car Driver of the Year (1951)
- National Motorsports Press Association (NMPA) Hall of Fame (1968)
- National Auto Racing Hall of Fame (1988)
- TRS/NASCAR Mechanics Hall of Fame (1989)
- Racing Writers and Broadcasters Association Hall of Fame (1991)
- Named one of NASCAR’s 50 Greatest Drivers (1998)
- Motorsports Hall of Fame of America (2014)
- Named one of NASCAR’s 75 Greatest Drivers (2023)

== Motorsports career results ==
=== Indianapolis 500 ===
Year	Car	Start	Qual	Rank	Finish	Laps	Led	Retired
1953	22	22	135.721	25	18	169	0	Oil Leak
1954	16*	-	-	-	15	?	?	Running
1954	31**	-	-	-	23	?	?	Clutch
1957	48	28	140.329	26	7	200	0	Running
**Totals**						369	0	

Starts	3
Poles	0
Front Row	0
Wins	0
Top 5	0
Top 10	1
Retired	1

* Shared drive with Duane Carter, Jimmy Jackson and Tony Bettenhausen
** Shared drive with Gene Hartley

=== NASCAR ===
(key) (Bold – Pole position awarded by qualifying time. Italics – Pole position earned by points standings or practice time. * – Most laps led. ** – All laps led.)

==== Grand National Series ====
NASCAR Grand National Series results
Year	Team	No.	Make	1	2	3	4	5	6	7	8	9	10	11	12	13	14	15	16	17	18	19	20	21	22	23	24	25	26	27	28	29	30	31	32	33	34	35	36	37	38	39	40	41	NGNC	Pts	Ref
1949	Bill Appleton	6	Hudson	CLT	DAB; 14	HBO	LAN	HAM	MAR	HEI	NWS																																		62nd	4	
1950	Paul Cox	6	Hudson	DAB; 32	CLT	LAN	MAR	CAN	VER	DSP	MCF	CLT	HBO; 17	DSP	HAM	DAR; 63	LAN	NWS	VER	MAR	WIN	HBO																							119th	-	
1951	Marshall Teague	6	Hudson	DAB; 1	CLT; 3	NMO	GAR; 1**	HBO	ASF; 1*	NWS	MAR; 23	CAN; 1	CLS; 31	CLB; 3	DSP; 6	GAR	GRS; 1*	BAI; 31	HEI	AWS; 29	MCF	ALS	**MSF**; 33	FMS	MOR	ABS	DAR; 33	CLB	CCS	LAN; 6	CLT	DSP	WIL	HBO	TPN	PGS	MAR	OAK	NWS	HMS	JSP	ATL	GAR	NMO	NA	-	
1952	Marshall Teague	6	Hudson	PBS	DAB; 1*	**JSP**; 1**	NWS; 16	MAR	CLB; 22	ATL	CCS	LAN	DAR	DSP	CAN	HAY	FMS	HBO	CLT	MSF	NIF	OSW	MON	MOR	PPS	MCF	AWS	DAR	CCS	LAN	DSP	WIL	HBO	MAR	NWS	ATL	PBS								NA	-	

Sporting positions
Preceded by Rodger Ward	AAA Stock Car Champion; 1952	Succeeded by Frank Mundy
Preceded by Frank Mundy	AAA Stock Car Champion; 1954	Succeeded by Frank Mundy
