= Frank Mundy =

American racing driver (1918–2009)

Frank "Rebel" Mundy
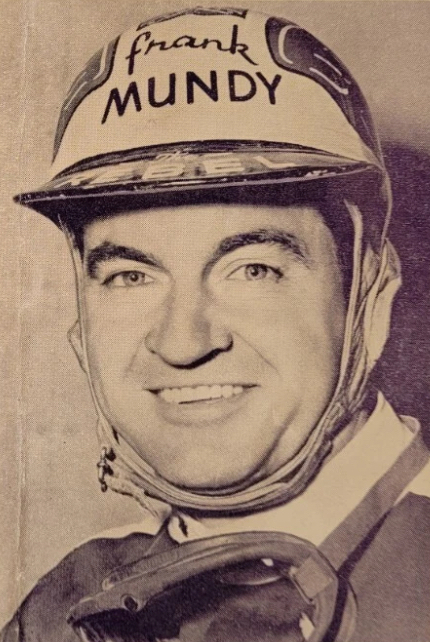
- Mundy in the 1950s
- Born: Francisco Eduardo Menendez; June 18, 1918 Atlanta, Georgia, U.S.
- Died: May 15, 2009 (aged 90) Atlanta, Georgia, U.S.

Championship titles
- AAA Stock Car (1953, 1955)

AAA/USAC Stock Car career
- Years active: 1952–1955
- Championships: 2
- Best finish: 1st in 1953, 1955

NASCAR Cup Series career
- 52 races run over 5 years
- Best finish: 5th (1951)
- First race: 1949 Race 1 (Charlotte)
- Last race: 1956 Old Dominion 400 (Martinsville)
- First win: 1951 Race 11 (Columbia)
- Last win: 1951 Race 41 (Mobile)
Wins	Top tens	Poles
3	24	4

Frank "Rebel" Mundy (born Francisco Eduardo Menendez; June 18, 1918 – May 15, 2009) was an American stock car racer. He competed in the American Automobile Association (AAA) stock cars, winning the 1955 national championship, before the series changed to United States Auto Club (USAC) sanction. He also raced in NASCAR's Grand National (now NASCAR Cup Series) and won three races under that sanction.

Mundy attempted to qualify for the 1954 Indianapolis 500 but did not make the field.

== Career ==
Before starting a racing career, Mundy was a daredevil who performed at the 1939 New York World's Fair. During World War II, he served as a personal driver for General George S. Patton, where he would gain valuable driving experience for NASCAR.

=== NASCAR ===
In 1948, Mundy moved to Daytona Beach, Florida to pursue a career in motorcycle racing. While at a gas station owned by Bill France Sr., he befriended France and was later invited to a 1947 meeting at the Streamline Hotel to form NASCAR; Mundy helped hold the flash for the photographer while taking a group photo.

Mundy started at the pole position only to find himself finishing the race in 82nd place at the 1951 running of the Southern 500. His career average start would eventually become 11th while his career average finish would become 17th place. Mundy would race 3,583 laps in his career – the equivalent of 3,184.6 miles (5,125.1 km). Out of the 3583 laps that he completed in his career, Mundy would only lead 458 (12%) of them. His career spanned 1949 to 1956.

One of Mundy's accomplishments was winning the 1955 running of the Southern Illinois 100. Frequently seen in rides owned by Carl Kiekhaefer, Mundy's seven-year career would involve him racing in classic races like the 1956 Southern 500 where he finished in 38th place out of 70 competitors. He would also be seen racing at Lakeview Speedway in Mobile, Alabama.

=== AAA/USAC Stock Cars ===
In 1952, Mundy began racing in American Automobile Association (AAA) and USAC Stock Car after disassociating with NASCAR following an argument with France; he did not return to NASCAR until 1955.

Mundy won the 1955 AAA national stock car championship. Studebaker and Oldsmobile were Mundy's preferred manufacturers for NASCAR rides.

== Personal life ==
Mundy was born Francisco Eduardo Menendez in Atlanta, where he grew up in an orphanage; he adopted the Frank Mundy name when he began racing. His father was of Mexican descent and his mother was of Irish descent.

After his racing career ended, Mundy worked for Penske Racing as a pit crew member.

His widow Mae Mundy would survive him after his death in 2009.

== Motorsports career results ==
=== NASCAR ===
(key) (Bold – Pole position awarded by qualifying time. Italics – Pole position earned by points standings or practice time. * – Most laps led.)

==== Grand National Series ====
NASCAR Grand National Series results
Year	Team	No.	Make	1	2	3	4	5	6	7	8	9	10	11	12	13	14	15	16	17	18	19	20	21	22	23	24	25	26	27	28	29	30	31	32	33	34	35	36	37	38	39	40	41	42	43	44	45	46	47	48	49	50	51	52	53	54	55	56	NGNC	Pts	Ref
1949	Rice Racing	4	Cadillac	CLT; 30																																																								10th	370	
1949	Rice Racing	5	Olds		DAB; 3	HBO																																																						10th	370	
1949	Rice Racing	44	Cadillac				LAN; 4	HAM	MAR	HEI																																																		10th	370	
1949		2	Ford								NWS; 22																																																	10th	370	
1950	Buddy Elliott	44	Cadillac	DAB; 37																																																								23rd	275.5	
1950			Olds		CLT; 11							CLT; 8	HBO	DSP	HAM; 7	DAR																																												23rd	275.5	
1950		90	Lincoln			LAN; 6	MAR	CAN	VER																																																			23rd	275.5	
1950	Nash Motor Co.	37	Nash							DSP; 25	MCF																																																	23rd	275.5	
1950		44	Olds														LAN; 32	NWS																																										23rd	275.5	
1950	Nash Motor Co.		Nash																VER; 22	MAR	WIN	HBO																																						23rd	275.5	
1951	Perry Smith	23	Studebaker	DAB	CLT; 34	NMO		HBO; 2	ASF	NWS; 28	MAR; 2	CAN; 7	CLS; 8	**CLB**; 1*	DSP; 23	GAR	GRS; 7	BAI; 3	HEI; 30	AWS; 4	MCF; 23	ALS	MSF; 50	FMS; 33	MOR; 23	ABS; 13	**DAR**; 82	CLB; 17	CCS	LAN	CLT; 26	DSP	WIL	HBO	TPN; 21	PGS					JSP; 5	**ATL**; 4	GAR	**NMO**; 1*																5th	1963.5	
1951	Perry Smith		Chevy				GAR; 11																																																					5th	1963.5	
1951	Ted Chester	7	Olds																																		MAR; 1*	OAK	NWS	HMS																				5th	1963.5	
1952	Ted Chester	7	Olds	PBS; 6	DAB	JSP	NWS	MAR	CLB	ATL		LAN; 30	DAR; 10	DSP	CAN	HAY	FMS	HBO	CLT																																									209th	0	
1952	Ted Chester	7	Plymouth								CCS; 15																																																	209th	0	
1952	Walt Chapman	121	Hudson																	MSF; 11	NIF	OSW	MON	MOR	PPS	MCF	AWS	DAR	CCS	LAN	DSP	WIL	HBO	MAR	NWS	ATL	PBS																							209th	0	
1956	Carl Kiekhaefer	30	Chrysler	HCY	CLT	WSS	PBS	ASF; 2																																																				24th	1856	
1956	Carl Kiekhaefer	300B	Chrysler						DAB; 43	PBS	WIL	ATL; 16	NWS	LAN	RCH	CLB	CON	GPS	HCY	HBO	MAR	LIN	CLT	POR	EUR	NYF	MER	MAS	CLT	MCF	POR																													24th	1856	
1956	Carl Kiekhaefer	500B	Dodge																													AWS; 6				CHI; 5	CCF	MGY	OKL																					24th	1856	
1956	Carl Kiekhaefer	502	Dodge																														RSP; 3	PIF	CSF																									24th	1856	
1956	Carl Kiekhaefer	300	Chrysler																																					ROA; 14	OBS	SAN	NOR	PIF	MYB	POR														24th	1856	
1956	Carl Kiekhaefer	27	Dodge																																												DAR; 38	CSH	CLT	LAN	POR	CLB	HBO	NWP	CLT	CCF				24th	1856	
1956	Carl Kiekhaefer	50	Dodge																																																						MAR; 9	HCY	WIL	24th	1856	

=== Indy 500 results ===
Year	Car	Start	Qual	Rank	Finish	Laps	Led	Retired
1954	41	DNQ	N/A	11	N/A	0	0	Did not qualify
**Totals**						0	0	

Starts	0
Poles	0
Front Row	0
Wins	0
Top 5	0
Top 10	0
Retired	0

Sporting positions
Preceded by Marshall Teague	AAA Stock Car Champion; 1953	Succeeded by Marshall Teague
Preceded by Marshall Teague	AAA Stock Car Champion; 1955	Succeeded by Johnny Mantz (USAC)
