= Gober Sosebee =

American racing driver (1915–1996)

- Born: October 15, 1915; Dawsonville, Georgia, U.S.
- Died: November 11, 1996 (aged 81); Dawsonville, Georgia, U.S.
- Cause of death: Agriculture accident

NASCAR Cup Series career
- 71 races run over 9 years
- Best finish: 14th - 1953 Grand National Series season
- First race: 1949 race (Daytona Beach Road Course)
- Last race: 1959 Daytona 500 (Daytona)
- First win: 1952 Hayloft Speedway race (Augusta, Georgia)
- Last win: 1954 Central City Speedway race (Macon, Georgia)
Wins	Top tens	Poles
2	33	4

Gober Cletus Sosebee (October 15, 1915 – November 11, 1996) was an American racecar driver. He won on the Daytona Beach Road Course in 1949, 1950, and 1951. He was born in Dawson County, Georgia, and began his career in 1940 at Atlanta's Lakewood Speedway.

Sosebee also won two Grand National Series races, one in 1952 and another in 1954. He also had four pole positions (including his first NASCAR race at Daytona Beach) and 33 top-ten finishes during his career, and also ran five races in the NASCAR Convertible Division.

Sosebee's son, David, is also a former NASCAR driver.

== Motorsports career results ==
=== NASCAR ===
(key) (Bold – Pole position awarded by qualifying time. Italics – Pole position earned by points standings or practice time. * – Most laps led.)

==== Grand National Series ====
NASCAR Grand National Series results
Year	Team	No.	Make	1	2	3	4	5	6	7	8	9	10	11	12	13	14	15	16	17	18	19	20	21	22	23	24	25	26	27	28	29	30	31	32	33	34	35	36	37	38	39	40	41	42	43	44	45	46	47	48	49	50	51	NGNC	Pts	Ref
1949	Leon Chester	50	Olds	CLT	**DAB**; 8*	HBO; 2	LAN; 19*	HAM	MAR	HEI	NWS																																												15th	265	
1950	Ted Chester	50	Olds	DAB; 30	CLT	LAN	MAR	CAN	VER	DSP	MCF	CLT	HBO	DSP	HAM																																										
1950	Sosebee Racing	51	Olds													DAR; 17	LAN	NWS	VER	MAR	WIN	HBO																																			
1951	Sosebee Racing	50	Olds	DAB; 52	CLT	NMO	GAR	HBO	ASF	NWS	MAR	CAN																																											17th	711.25	
1951	Sam Knox	51	Cadillac										**CLS**; 2										MSF; 42	FMS	MOR	ABS																													17th	711.25	
1951	Sam Knox	22	Cadillac											CLB; 15	DSP	GAR	GRS	BAI	HEI																																				17th	711.25	
1951	Sosebee Racing	51	Olds																	AWS; 2	MCF	ALS					DAR; 16	CLB	CCS; 2	LAN	CLT	DSP	WIL	HBO; 21	TPN	PGS	MAR	OAK	NWS	HMS	JSP	ATL; 5	GAR	NMO; 7											17th	711.25	
1952	Sosebee Racing	51	Olds	PBS	DAB; 5	JSP; 28	NWS	MAR			CCS; 5	LAN																																											90th		
1952	Frank Christian	14	Olds						CLB; 12																																														90th		
1952	Sam Knox	51	Cadillac							ATL; 9																																													90th		
1952	Sam Knox	51	Chrysler										DAR; 11	DSP	CAN	HAY; 1*	FMS	HBO	CLT; 14	MSF	NIF	OSW	MON	MOR	PPS	MCF	AWS	DAR	CCS	LAN	DSP	WIL	HBO	MAR	NWS	ATL; 5	PBS																		90th		
1953	Sam Knox	51	Chrysler	PBS; 12	DAB; 11	HAR	NWS																																																14th	2525	
1953	Sosebee Racing	51	Olds					CLT; 2	RCH	CCS; 16	LAN	CLB; 6	HCY	MAR	PMS; 14	RSP	LOU; 7	FIF; 9	LAN	TCS	WIL	MCF	PIF; 8	MOR							PAS; 10	HCY	DAR; 23	CCS; 3*	LAN; 12	BLF	WIL; 10	NWS; 14	MAR	ATL; 11															14th	2525	
1953	Sosebee Racing	50	Olds																						ATL; 6	RVS	LCF	DAV	HBO	AWS																									14th	2525	
1954	Sosebee Racing	51	Olds	PBS	DAB; 9	JSP; 16	ATL; 4	OSP; 3	OAK	**NWS**; 12*	HBO; 26	CCS; 1	LAN; 23	WIL	MAR; 15	SHA	RSP	CLT; 21	GAR	CLB; 18	LND	HCY	MCF	WGS	PIF	AWS; 5	SFS	GRS	MOR	OAK	CLT; 10	SAN	COR; 17	DAR; DNQ	CCS; 16	CLT	LAN		MAR; 23	NWS; 27															15th	2114	
1954	Elmer Brooks	44	Olds																																			MAS; 10																	15th	2114	
1955	Sosebee Racing	51	Olds	TCS; 4	PBS	JSP; 19	DAB; 45	OSP; 18	CLB; 17	HBO	NWS	MGY	LAN	CLT; 4	HCY	ASF	TUS	MAR	RCH	NCF	FOR	LIN	MCF	FON	AIR	CLT	PIF	CLB	AWS	MOR	ALS	NYF	SAN	CLT	FOR	MAS	RSP	DAR	MGY	LAN	RSP	GPS	MAS	CLB	MAR	LVP	NWS	HBO							64th		
1958	Sosebee Racing	50	Olds	FAY	DAB	CON	FAY	WIL	HBO	FAY	CLB	PIF	ATL	CLT	MAR	ODS	OBS	GPS	GBF	STR	NWS	BGS	TRN	RSD	CLB	NBS	REF	LIN	HCY	AWS	RSP	MCC	SLS	TOR	BUF	MCF	BEL	BRR	CLB	NSV	AWS	BGS	MBS	DAR	CLT	BIR; 10	CSF	GAF	RCH	HBO; 8	**SAS**; 7	MAR	NWS; 11	ATL; 25	112th		
1959	Sosebee Racing	50	Olds	FAY	DAY	DAY; 49	HBO	CON	ATL	WIL	BGS	CLB	NWS	REF	HCY	MAR	TRN	CLT	NSV	ASP	PIF	GPS	ATL	CLB	WIL	RCH	BGS	AWS	DAY	HEI	CLT	MBS	CLT	NSV	AWS	BGS	GPS	CLB	DAR	HCY	RCH	CSF	HBO	MAR	AWS	NWS	CON										

===== Daytona 500 =====
Year	Team	Manufacturer	Start	Finish
1959	Sosebee Racing	Chevrolet	36	49
