= Danny Weinberg =

American race car driver (1928–1964)

Denny Weinberg
- Born: October 4, 1928; Ontario, California, U.S.
- Died: November 16, 1986 (aged 58)

NASCAR Cup Series career
- 17 races run over 7 years
- Best finish: 30th (1951)
- First race: 1951 Race 4 (Gardena)
- Last race: 1964 Motor Trend 500 (Riverside)
- First win: 1951 Race 37 (Hanford)
Wins	Top tens	Poles
1	9	1

ARCA Menards Series West career
- 31 races run over 7 years
- Best finish: 6th (1962)
- First race: 1958 Race 10 (Sacramento)
- Last race: 1964 Race 25 (Gardena)
- First win: 1960 Race 4 (Gardena)
Wins	Top tens	Poles
1	15	1
- Statistics up to date as of October 21, 2026.

Danny Weinberg (April 10, 1928 – August 31, 1988) was an American race car driver who raced in NASCAR, mainly focusing on the West Coast. He won the 37th race of the 1951 NASCAR Grand National Series (now NASCAR Cup Series) at Marchbanks Speedway, his first and only Grand National Series win. This would also be one of only three NASCAR wins for Studebaker. He would later win his only career pole in 1961 at Ascot Stadium near Los Angeles.

Weinberg flipped during the 1963 race at Riverside International Raceway. He suffered from back issues later in life due to crashes suffered during his racing career.
