= Tommy Thompson (NASCAR racing driver) =

American racing driver (1922–1986)

- Thompson in victory lane at Michigan State Fairgrounds Speedway
- Born: April 22, 1922
- Died: August 4, 1986 (aged 63)

NASCAR Cup Series career
- 22 races run over 8 years
- Best finish: 114th (1951)
- First race: 1950 Race #1 (Daytona Beach and Road Course)
- Last race: 1959 Race #26 (Daytona International Speedway)
- First win: 1951 Race #20 (Michigan State Fairgrounds Speedway)
Wins	Top tens	Poles
1	6	0

ARCA Menards Series career
- 9 races run over 7 years
- First race: 1953 Race #16 (Dayton Speedway)
- Last race: 1963 Race 33 (Dayton Speedway)
Wins	Top tens	Poles
0	6	0

Tommy Thompson (April 22, 1922 – August 4, 1986) was an American stock car racing driver who competed in the NASCAR Grand National Series from 1950 to 1959 where he won a singular race. He also competed in the NASCAR modified series and the ARCA Racing Series.

== Racing career ==
Thompson first started his career racing in the late 1940s at Sportsdrome Speedway in Indiana driving the No. 40 sedan.

Thompson made his NASCAR Grand National Series debut during the first race of the 1950 season at the Daytona Beach and Road Course, where he finished in 26th. Thompson raced two more times that season at Dayton Speedway and Darlington Raceway. His best season came in 1951, where he started five races and won his first and only NASCAR race at Michigan State Fairgrounds Speedway on August 12, 1951, taking the lead late and holding off both Curtis Turner and Joe Eubanks. The race was later named one of NASCAR's 75 greatest races in 2023. He also picked up a sixth-place finish at Fort Miami Speedway. During the 1952 season, he started five races and secured one top 10 at the Daytona Beach Road Course. In 1953, he raced three times picking up one top-five at the Daytona Beach Road Course along with one top-ten. From 1954 to 1956, Thompson only raced once a year. Thompson's final season came in 1959, where he raced three times. His final Grand National Series race was at Daytona International Speedway on July 4, 1959, where he finished in 15th.

Throughout his career, Thompson also made three starts in the NASCAR Modified National Championship, and nine starts in the ARCA Racing Series, securing six top-ten finishes. Throughout his career, he was known to have an aggressive racing style.

== Other ventures ==
Thompson was from Louisville, Kentucky and was a successful engineer-contractor. Thompson was also the builder of the Fairgrounds Motor Speedway in Louisville and served as the track's president for three years before resigning in 1964.
