= Lou Figaro =

American racing driver (1920–1954)

- Born: Louis Angelo Figaro, Jr. October 12, 1920; Inglewood, California, U.S.
- Died: October 25, 1954 (aged 34); Winston-Salem, North Carolina, U.S.
- Cause of death: Injuries from racing accident
- Achievements: 1953 WAR Championship (late models)
- Awards: West Coast Stock Car Hall of Fame (2002 - Inaugural Class)

NASCAR Cup Series career
- 17 races run over 2 years
- Best finish: 22nd (1951)
- First race: 1951 untitled race (Phoenix)
- Last race: 1954 Wilkes 160 (North Wilkesboro)
- First win: 1951 untitled race (Carrell)
Wins	Top tens	Poles
1	6	1

Louis Angelo Figaro, Jr. (October 12, 1920 – October 25, 1954) was an American racing driver. He was the son of Louis Angelo Figaro (LeoLuca Ficara) and Amanda Bartley. His father immigrated from Corleone, Sicily in 1903.

Figaro competed in 17 NASCAR Cup Series races from 1951 to 1954, picking up one victory in the 1951 event at Carrell Speedway in Gardena, California. He was seriously injured in an accident during the 1954 Wilkes 160 at North Wilkesboro Speedway on October 24, 1954, when his vehicle smashed through the guardrail and overturned with three laps left. He died in the hospital the following day.

In 2002, Figaro was inducted into the West Coast Stock Car Hall of Fame. His granddaughter, Tracy Figaro-Davis, accepted.

Preceded by Frank Arford	NASCAR Cup Series fatal accidents 1954	Succeeded by John McVitty
