= Leo Breithaupt =

American racing driver (1914–1984)

- Born: July 9, 1914; Los Angeles, California, U.S.
- Died: February 17, 1984 (aged 69)

NASCAR Cup Series career
- 1 race run over 1 year
- First race: 1951 Race 4 (Gardena)
Wins	Top tens	Poles
0	1	0
- Statistics up to date as of September 4, 2026.

Leo Breithaupt (July 9, 1914 – February 17, 1984) was an American racing driver from Los Angeles, California. Breithaupt raced Jalopies in the California Jalopy Association. He also competed in one NASCAR Grand National Series event in his career. That came in 1951, when Breithaupt competed at Carrell Speedway in Gardena, California. Starting 15th in the twenty-car field, Breithaupt moved up to ninth place in the end of the day, scoring a top-ten and $75 in his only NASCAR race. In his later years Breithaupt worked at Long Beach Lions drag strip. He is the father of former Bicycle Motocross (BMX) racer, Scot Breithaupt.
