= Bill Snowden =

American racing driver (1910–1959)

- Born: May 6, 1910; St. Augustine, Florida, U.S.
- Died: February 2, 1959 (aged 48); St. Augustine, Florida, U.S.
- Cause of death: Heart Attack
- Awards: 1992 inductee in the Jacksonville Stock Car Racing Hall of Fame

NASCAR Cup Series career
- 24 races run over 4 years
- Best finish: 9th (1951)
- First race: 1949 Race No. 1 (Charlotte)
- Last race: 1952 Central City Speedway (Macon, Georgia)
| Wins | Top tens | Poles |
|---|---|---|
| 0 | 15 | 0 |

William Andrew Snowden (May 6, 1910 – February 2, 1959) was a NASCAR driver from St. Augustine, Florida, USA. He was one of the racers whose career was interrupted by World War II. He was nicknamed "Wild Bill" and "the Florida Hurricane".

Snowden competed on various circuits before NASCAR was organized, and he had second-place finishes at the Daytona Beach Road Course in 1941 and 1948. He competed in NASCAR's Strictly Stock/Grand National Series (now NASCAR Cup Series) races between the series' inception in 1949 and 1952. He had 15 top-ten and five top-five finishes in those 24 races.

== NASCAR career ==
In the series' first year in 1949, Snowden competed in four of the eight events, with three top-tens and a season-best fifth-place finish at Occoneechee Speedway at Hillsboro, North Carolina. Snowden finished 11th in the season points.

Snowden competed in four events in the next season, finishing 40th in season points with two top-tens. His season-best fifth-place finish happened at Charlotte Speedway.

Snowden had a career-best ninth place season points finish in 1951. In 21 starts, he had nine top-ten finishes with two career-best fourth-place finishes at Martinsville Speedway and Speedway Park in Jacksonville.

1952 was Snowden's final season in Grand National. He competed in four events, with one top-ten with his sixth-place finish at Hayloft Speedway in Augusta, Georgia. Fireball Roberts raced one event in Snowden's car that season, and Banjo Matthews used Snowden's car in three events with one fifth-place finish at Darlington Raceway.

After his retirement from racing, Snowden became a shrimp boat operator. He died on February 2, 1959. In 1992, he was inducted in the Jacksonville Stock Car Racing Hall of Fame.
