= Billy Carden =

American racing driver (1924-2004)

- Carden in the 1950s
- Born: April 1, 1924; Mableton, Georgia, U.S.
- Died: October 25, 2004 (aged 80); Smyrna, Georgia, U.S.

NASCAR Cup Series career
- 73 races run over 9 years
- Best finish: 22nd (1956)
- First race: 1949 untitled race (Daytona Beach-Road)
- Last race: 1959 untitled race (Lakewood)
Wins	Top tens	Poles
0	17	2

Billy Carden (April 1, 1924 – October 25, 2004) was an American racing driver from Mableton, Georgia. He was a stock car racing pioneer and an early NASCAR competitor. He made over 50 NASCAR Grand National (now Cup) starts and also dabbled in the NASCAR Convertible Division.

== Racing career ==
=== NASCAR ===
Carden has contributed four finishes in the top five, seventeen finishes in the top ten, starting the race at the pole position twice, 58 laps led, and 6431.8 miles (7951 laps) of racing experience at the top level. He was a participant at both the 1955 Southern 500 and the 1959 Daytona 500 which were seen as the major events of his generation. After the end of his career, total career earnings for Carden were considered to be $8,415 ($92,939.64 when adjusted for inflation). Out of all his races that he has participated in his career, Carden has started an average of 13th place and finished an average of 18th place.

Carden's ultimate retirement from any form of professional motorsports came on June 14, 1959 at a NASCAR Grand National Convertible race at Lakewood Speedway. He would start in 12th and finish in 16th; collecting a meager $110 in the process ($1,214.9 when adjusted for inflation). Competitors in that race included Lee Petty, his son Richard, and Buck Baker.

Most of Carden's top-five and top-ten finishes were done on short tracks. He was generally more successful there as opposed to superspeedways, road courses, and intermediate tracks.

=== Short tracks ===
Carden started his racing career in his home state of Georgia in 1947. He went on to claim championships on tracks in Georgia and Tennessee and raced with Fonty Flock and Bob Flock. Carden also competed at several Georgia racetracks on a part-time basis, winning a 200 lap AAA Stock Car National Championship race at Lakewood Speedway over eventual 1950 AAA champion Jay Frank - whose tire blew while leading late, and 1949 NASCAR champion Red Byron. He won a 1948 race at Columbus Speedway that was marred by a Byron crash that resulted in the death of a seven-year-old spectator. Carden owned his hometown Mableton Speedway in 1948 and 1949 while racing at it.
