= 1951 Southern 500 =

Auto race held at Darlington Raceway in 1951

Race details
- Race 24 of 41 in the 1951 NASCAR Grand National Series season
- 1951 Southern 500 program cover
- Date: September 3, 1951
- Official name: Southern 500
- Location: Darlington Raceway, Darlington, South Carolina
- Course: Permanent racing facility
- Course length: 1.375 miles (2.213 km)
- Distance: 400 laps, 500 mi (800 km)
- Weather: Extremely hot with temperatures of 91.9 °F (33.3 °C); wind speeds of 8.9 miles per hour (14.3 km/h)
- Average speed: 84.597 miles per hour (136.146 km/h)

Pole position
| Driver | Frank Mundy | Perry Smith |
- Time: 427.690 seconds

Most laps led
| Driver | Herb Thomas | Herb Thomas |
- Laps: 311

Winner
| No. 92 | Herb Thomas | Herb Thomas |

The 1951 Southern 500, the second running of the event, was a NASCAR Grand National Series event that was held on September 3, 1951, at Darlington Raceway in Darlington, South Carolina. The winner of the race was Herb Thomas. The event had the most starters in NASCAR history with 82 cars starting the race, of which 58 cars would not finish the race and only one car (driven by Herb Thomas) finished on the lead lap.

== Background ==
Darlington Raceway, nicknamed by many NASCAR fans and drivers as "The Lady in Black" or "The Track Too Tough to Tame" and advertised as a "NASCAR Tradition", is a race track built for NASCAR racing located near Darlington, South Carolina. It is of a unique, somewhat egg-shaped design, an oval with the ends of very different configurations, a condition which supposedly arose from the proximity of one end of the track to a minnow pond the owner refused to relocate. This situation makes it very challenging for the crews to set up their cars' handling in a way that will be effective at both ends.

The track is a four-turn 1.366 miles (2.198 km) oval. The track's first two turns are banked at twenty-five degrees, while the final two turns are banked two degrees lower at twenty-three degrees. The front stretch (the location of the finish line) and the back stretch is banked at six degrees. Darlington Raceway can seat up to 60,000 people.

Darlington has something of a legendary quality among drivers and older fans; this is probably due to its long track length relative to other NASCAR speedways of its era and hence the first venue where many of them became cognizant of the truly high speeds that stock cars could achieve on a long track. The track allegedly earned the moniker The Lady in Black because the night before the race the track maintenance crew would cover the entire track with fresh asphalt sealant, in the early years of the speedway, thus making the racing surface dark black. Darlington is also known as "The Track Too Tough to Tame" because drivers can run lap after lap without a problem and then bounce off of the wall the following lap. Racers will frequently explain that they have to race the racetrack, not their competition. Drivers hitting the wall are considered to have received their "Darlington Stripe" thanks to the missing paint on the right side of the car.

== Summary ==
In qualifying, Frank Mundy would win the pole with a speed of 84.173 miles per hour (135.463 km/h). He was followed by Herb Thomas, Jesse James Taylor, Fonty Flock, and Hershel McGriff. 82 cars would start the race, a NASCAR record to this day.

Four hundred laps were done on a paved oval track spanning 1.250 miles (2.012 km) for a grand total of 500.0 miles (804.7 km). The race lasted for six hours and thirty minutes. Herb Thomas led the first six laps, before Jesse James Taylor took the lead, holding it for the next 7 laps. Pole-sitter Frank Mundy dropped out with oil pressure problems 12 laps in, finishing dead last. Marshall Teague, who passed 46 cars in 13 laps, inherited the lead on lap 13. After Curtis Turner took the lead on lap 52, Herb Thomas would grab the lead back from Turner on lap 95, leading the rest of the race to defeat Jesse James Taylor by more than one lap, in front of forty thousand people. Buddy Shuman would finish third, eight laps down, while Hershel McGriff and Fireball Roberts made up the top five. Turner would drop out of the race with a blown engine 272 laps in.

This race demonstrates how the NASCAR Cup Series has changed over the years. If a driver started in 36th place during the early-1950s, they were 46 spots ahead of last place. If a driver started in 36th place in a 21st-century NASCAR race, they become probably a backmarker and are profoundly unlikely to win the race or even finish in a respectable top-ten finish.

Oliver Dial, Frank Gise, Rudy Hires, Sandy Lynch, Fred Moore, Bob Pronger, Gwyn Staley, Billy Tibbett, and Herb Trimble would make their respective professional stock car racing starts in this event. Notable crew chiefs for this race were Smokey Yunick, Buckshot Morris, and Doug Meeks.

This race would be Red Byron's final race in NASCAR. Total winnings for this race were $23,740 ($294,467 when adjusted for inflation). As it was with all races during this era, there was no televised coverage of this racing event.

=== Qualifying ===
Note: Qualifying was an eight-lap run; the fastest lap time was actually 53.4 seconds while the slowest lap time was 54.6 seconds.

| Grid | No. | Driver | Manufacturer | Speed | Time | Owner |
|---|---|---|---|---|---|---|
| 1 | 23 | Frank Mundy | '51 Studebaker | 84.173 | 7:07.690 | Perry Smith |
| 2 | 92 | Herb Thomas | '51 Hudson | 83.164 | 7:12.880 | Herb Thomas |
| 3 | 31 | Jesse James Taylor | '51 Hudson | 82.924 | 7:14.130 | Jesse James Taylor |
| 4 | 14 | Fonty Flock | '51 Oldsmobile | 82.645 | 7:15.600 | Frank Christian |
| 5 | 77 | Hershel McGriff | '51 Oldsmobile | 82.819 | 7:14.680 | Hershel McGriff |
| 6 | 16 | Bill Snowden | '51 Ford | 82.141 | 7:18.270 | Bill Snowden |
| 7 | 11 | Fireball Roberts | '51 Ford | 82.417 | 7:16.800 | Ed Saverance |
| 8 | 28 | Ray Chase | '50 Oldsmobile | 81.409 | 7:22.210 | Bill Sheldon |
| 9 | 38 | Frank Gise | '51 Studebaker | 81.194 | 7:23.880 | B.R. Waller |
| 10 | 7 | Bob Flock | '51 Oldsmobile | 82.284 | 7:17.510 | Ted Chester |

== Results ==
1. Herb Thomas
2. Jesse James Taylor
3. Buddy Shuman
4. Hershel McGriff
5. Fireball Roberts
6. Harold Kite
7. Leon Sales
8. Fonty Flock
9. Bill Snowden
10. Pap White
11. Tim Flock
12. Slick Smith
13. Jack Goodwin
14. Billy Carden
15. Lee Petty
16. Gober Sosebee
17. Bud Farrell
18. Billy Myers
19. Bill Widenhouse
20. George Seeger
21. Gayle Warren
22. Freddie Farmer
23. Cotton Owens
24. Ed Benedict
25. Red Byron
26. Bud Riley
27. Bob Flock
28. Jimmie Lewallen
29. Tommy Melvin
30. Earl Moss
31. Ewell Weddle
32. Shorty York
33. Marshall Teague
34. Johnny Yontz
35. Ted Swaim
36. Jim Fiebelkorn
37. Gene Comstock
38. Oliver Dial
39. Jim Paschal
40. Reino Tulonen
41. Ted Chamberlain
42. J.E. Hardie
43. Donald Thomas
44. Iggy Katona
45. Joe Merola
46. Dave Anderson
47. Bob Pronger
48. Jack Smith
49. Billy Tibbert
50. Jimmy Warden
51. Gene Darragh
52. Gwyn Staley
53. Jim Delaney
54. Erick Erickson
55. Bill Blair
56. Buck Baker
57. Curtis Turner
58. Wade Fields
59. Lloyd Dane
60. John Barker
61. Buck Baity
62. Ray Chase
63. Jimmy Thompson
64. Jimmy Ayers
65. Frank Giese
66. Sandy Lynch
67. Bob Johnson
68. Herb Trimble
69. Bob KIng
70. Tommy Thompson
71. Bill Rexford
72. Fred Moore
73. Weldon Adams
74. Murrace Walker
75. Joe Eubanks
76. Johnny Mantz
77. Rudy Hires
78. Sonny Black
79. Lloyd Moore
80. Lee Connell
81. Bobby Booth
82. Frank Mundy

Joe Weatherly withdrew before the race.

== Timeline ==
Section reference:

- Start of race: Herb Thomas officially had the pole position to begin the event.
- Lap 6: Jesse James Taylor took over the lead from Herb Thomas.
- Lap 12: Hershel McGriff took over the lead from Jesse James Taylor.
- Lap 13: Marshall Teague took over the lead from Hershel McGriff.
- Lap 52: Curtis Turner took over the lead from Marshall Teague.
- Lap 58: Lee Connell had a terminal crash, forcing him out of the race.
- Lap 95: Herb Thomas took over the lead from Curtis Turner.
- Lap 215: The wheels on Frank Gise's vehicle stopped working properly, causing him to leave the event early.
- Lap 272: Curtis Turner managed to blow his engine; forcing him out of the race.
- Lap 361: Marshall Teague and Johnny Yountz had terminal crashes at roughly the same time, forcing them out of the race.
- Lap 368: Red Byron had a terminal crash, forcing him out of the race.
- Lap 370: Gayle Warren had a terminal crash, forcing him out of the race.
- Finish: Herb Thomas was officially declared the winner of the event.

| Preceded by 1950 | Southern 500 races 1951 | Succeeded by 1952 |
