= Air Base Speedway =

Former motorsport track in South Carolina, United States

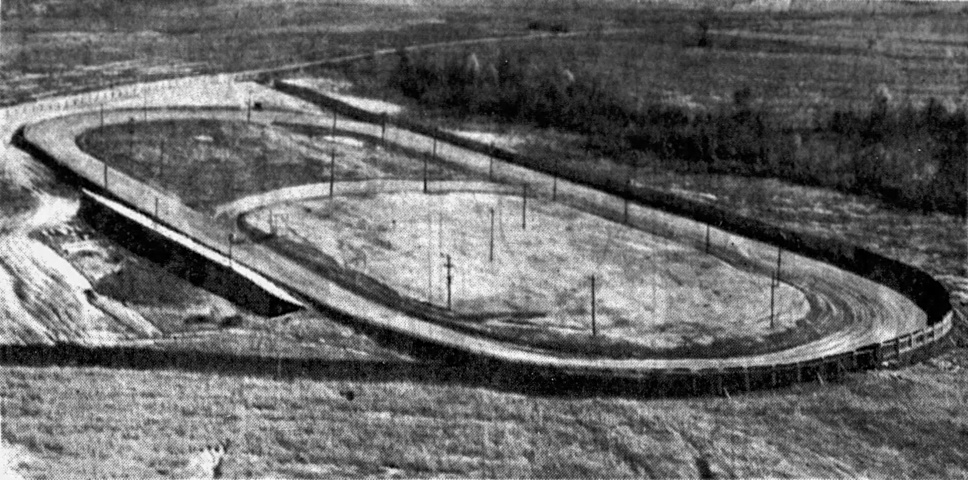
- Coordinates: 34.72953°N 82.37546°W
- Capacity: 7,000+
- Owner: Luther Charles (L. C.) Hicks, Jr.
- Opened: July 3, 1949; 76 years ago
- Closed: Estimated 1952; 74 years ago
- Former names: Textile Speedway (1949–1951)

1/2 Mile Oval
- Surface: Dirt (treated with calcium chloride)
- Length: 0.500 mi (0.805 km)
- Turns: 4

1/4 Mile Oval
- Surface: Dirt (treated with calcium chloride)
- Length: 0.250 mi (0.402 km)
- Turns: 4

Air Base Speedway, originally named (and interchangeably called) Textile Speedway and Greenville Textile Speedway, was a motorsports half-mile and quarter-mile dirt track facility located south of Greenville, South Carolina. It was located south of Donaldson Air Force Base, which was active during the same time period as the track.

This track eventually featured several types of racing, including motorcycles, midgets, and stock cars. Air Base Speedway, as it was then officially named, hosted one NASCAR Grand National Division race, on August 25, 1951, which was won by Bob Flock.

== History ==
Textile Speedway opened for motorsport racing for the first time on July 3, 1949, with two days of motorcycle racing. The track was originally owned and operated by L. C. Hicks, who owned Hicks Auto & Indian Sales in Greenville. Hicks renamed the complex Air Base Speedway, giving the track a grand re-opening on April 14, 1951. Many sources continued to refer to the track as Textile Speedway, even after this date.

Hicks was eventually able to get a sanctioned NASCAR Grand National race hosted at the track, which was held on August 25, 1951.

One week after the NASCAR race, Air Base Speedway was reported to have been leased to Buck Baker, Ike Kiser, and Roby Combs. This was not the trio's first foray into motorsport racing promotion: in 1950, they leased Charlotte Speedway to promote races, before selling that lease to Bruton Smith a year later.

On September 26, 1951, L. C. Hicks was charged with obtaining money relating to Air Base Speedway under false pretenses; specifically, that he had solicited $2,000 having given the impression that the Speedway property had no liens against it. Two individuals who held liens of more than $4,000 against the Speedway confirmed that this was not so, and a warrant was issued against Hicks.

Media references to Air Base Speedway diminish after this date.

In 1964, the whole circuit was still visible in satellite imagery, and in 1976, showing trees growing around the calcium-treated dirt, only two turns remained in any known images.

== Today ==
The site today is covered by three different buildings, a railroad spur, and dozens of trees, some affected by the calcium-treated surface. Very few images of the track exist today. One photograph in a newspaper advertisement for a race on April 14, 1951, has been found, showing an aerial shot of the circuit and displaying a few drivers' names, Buck Baker, Bob Flock (the only winner of a cup race held there), Red Byron and Gober Sosebee.

Many newspaper articles regarding the Cup Series race also exist online. However, many sources listed the 1951 NASCAR race as a Greenville-Pickens Speedway event because the track was so obscure. It was not until 2015 in a SpeedSport Magazine article when two editors, John Nelson and Tom Schmeh, denoted that the 1951 event was on a different racetrack. In 2019, YouTuber S1apSh0es (a Greenville, SC native) went viral after uploading a three-part series documenting the history and demise of Air Base Speedway after finding the track on RacingReference. A Getty Images photo of a flat surface dirt track exists, which is what he and many others speculate to be Air Base Speedway, from the lamp posts on the inside of the track to the wooden walls on the outside. This photo was said to be of Greenville-Pickens Speedway, which the track is frequently confused with.

== NASCAR race winners ==
=== Grand National ===
- 1951 Bob Flock
