= Lakeview Speedway =

Former NASCAR race track

Lakeview Speedway, also known as Mobile Speedway or New Mobile Speedway, was an American automobile racing circuit in Mobile, Alabama. It held two NASCAR Grand National Series races in 1951.

== NASCAR results ==
NASCAR held two races on the dirt 3/4 mile track, both in 1951. Tim Flock beat 23 other competitors to win the April 8, 1951 event. Later that year on November 25, Frank Mundy won the final event of the season.
