= Monroe County Fairgrounds =

Sports and convention venue in Monroe, Michigan

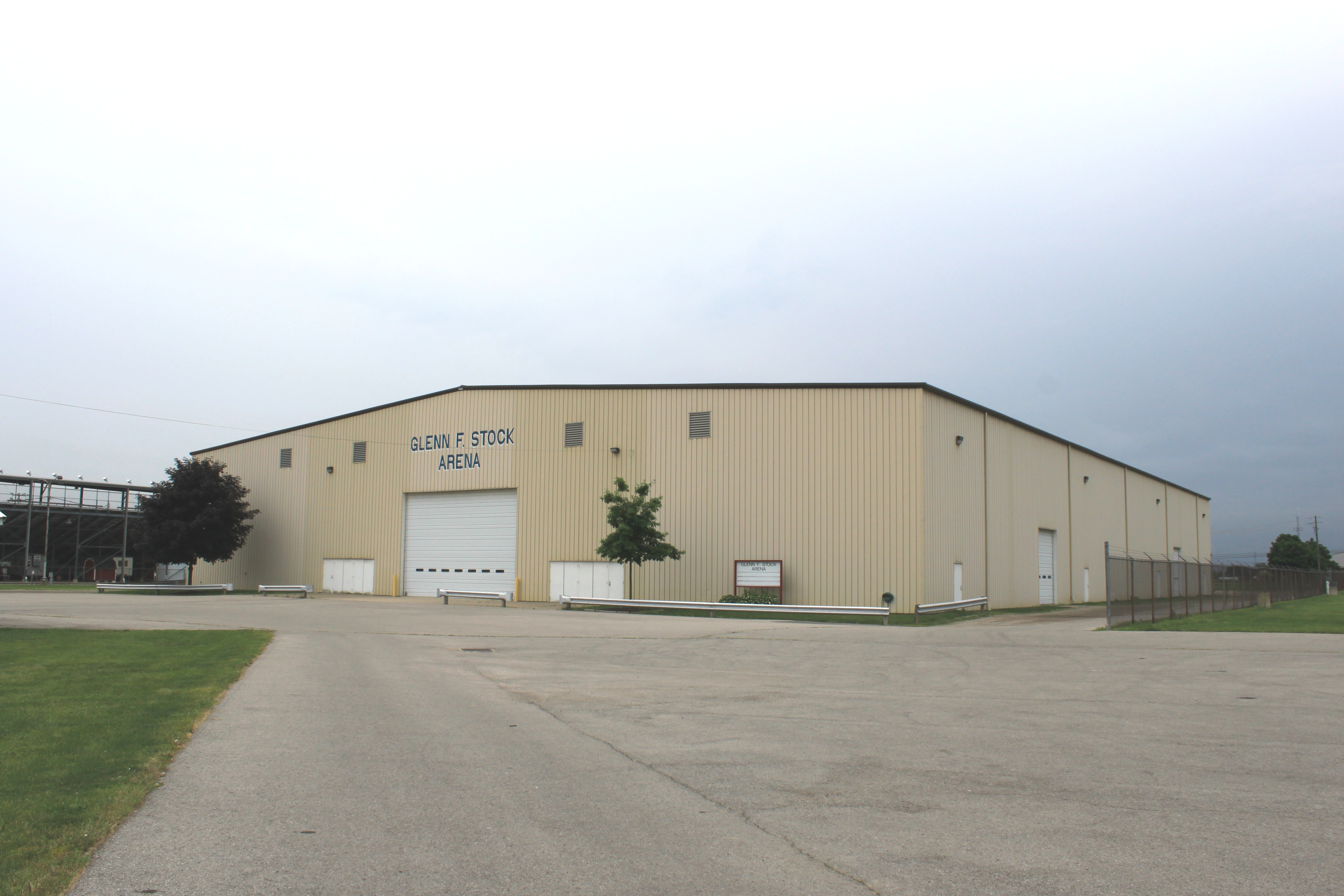
- The Glenn F. Stock Arena
- Interactive map of Monroe County Fairgrounds
- Address: 3775 S Custer Rd
- Location: Monroe, Michigan
- Coordinates: 41°55′46.9344″N 83°27′42.4296″W
- Owner: Monroe County Agricultural Society
- Capacity: 2,000 (Glenn F. Stock Arena)
- Type: Fairground, Convention center

Construction
- Opened: 1948

The Monroe County Fairgrounds in Monroe County, Michigan includes a number of buildings.

== History ==
The Monroe County Agricultural Society organized its first fair in 1849, but it wasn’t until 1948 that it was moved to this permanent location. All of the 120 acres of property is owned by the county and leased to the fair association on a 99-year agreement.

In 1952, a one half mile dirt oval on the premises hosted its only NASCAR Grand National Series (now NASCAR Cup) event. The race was won by racing pioneer Tim Flock, who went on to win that year’s series championship.

== Facilities ==
=== Stock Arena ===
Glenn F. Stock Arena is a 2,000-seat indoor arena located in Monroe, Michigan. It is used for sporting events, concerts, conventions, and trade shows. It is part of the Monroe County Fairgrounds. Stock Arena is also used for graduation ceremonies of Monroe County's high schools.

The arena measures 174 feet (53 m) wide by 252 feet (77 m) long with a 40-foot (12 m)-high ceiling. Although the Monroe County Fair's website hails the arena one of the "largest arenas in Michigan," this is actually not true as far as seating capacity is concerned; in fact, Stock Arena seats up to 3,500 for concerts. Many indoor arenas in Michigan have larger seating capacities. Also, several of them, including Little Caesars Arena, Breslin Center, and Van Andel Arena have higher ceiling heights. Stock Arena is, however, Monroe County's largest arena and the largest in Toledo's northern suburbs.

Other amenities include a 100-foot (30 m)-by-210-foot pipe fence separating the stands from the arena floor, and a wireless PA system that can be used inside and outside the building.

=== Other fairground facilities ===
Other facilities at the Monroe County Fairgrounds include:

- The First Merchants Bank Expo Center, a convention center with 27,000 square feet (2,500 m^{2}) of exhibit space
- Two buildings and a livestock show arena with 7,200 square feet (670 m^{2}) each of space
- The 4,800-square-foot (450 m^{2}) Far West Building
- The 2,400 4H Craft Building
- Two horse rings and 270 horse stalls
- A 9,000-seat grandstand used for auto racing and rodeos.
- Parking for 4,000 cars.
