= Wilson Speedway =

Former racetrack

- Location: Wilson, North Carolina
- Coordinates: 35.699°N 77.930°W
- Opened: 1934; 92 years ago
- Closed: 1989; 37 years ago
- Major events: NASCAR Cup Series; NASCAR Convertible Series

oval
- Surface: dirt
- Length: 0.50 mi (0.8 km)

Wilson Speedway was a half-mile dirt oval located in Wilson, North Carolina that held 12 NASCAR Cup Series between 1951 and 1960 and 5 races in the NASCAR Convertible Series from 1956 to 1958. and continued to hold local races until 1989 when the track was closed. The track was located at the Wilson County American Legion Fair Grounds.

== History ==
The track opened in 1934 and originally held horse racing before switching to becoming an auto racing track in 1935 the track was accredited three years later by AAA and held races until the United States' entry into World War II in 1941. Racing continued following the war until 1989.

Hours before the 1959 NASCAR race, the grandstands burned to the ground and 8000 fans in attendance watched the race from the ground. In the 1960 NASCAR race, Emanuel Zervakis was disqualified for his fuel tank being too large after winning the race.

During the 60's the track was one of the venues Dale Earnhardt raced at very early in his career.

As of 2022 the track is abandoned but still partially intact, with all of the track surface in turns 3 and 4 turning into grass and turns 1 and 2 being slightly off from the original track.

== NASCAR results ==
=== Cup Series Results ===
| Race Number | Winner | Manufacturer | Average Speed (mph) |
|---|---|---|---|
| 1951-30 | Fonty Flock | Oldsmobile | Unknown |
| 1952-29 | Herb Thomas | Hudson | 35.398 |
| 1953-18 | Fonty Flock | Hudson | 53.803 |
| 1953-34 | Herb Thomas | Hudson | 56.022 |
| 1954-11 | Buck Baker | Oldsmobile | 52.279 |
| 1956-08 | Herb Thomas | Chevrolet | 46.287 |
| 1956-56 | Buck Baker | Chrysler | 50.597 |
| 1957-06 | Ralph Moody | Ford | 55.079 |
| 1958-05 | Lee Petty | Oldsmobile | 48.459 |
| 1959-07 | Junior Johnson | Ford | 50.300 |
| 1959-22 | Junior Johnson | Ford | 58.065 |
| 1960-12 | Joe Weatherly | Ford | 55.113 |

=== Convertible Results ===
| Race Number | Winner | Manufacturer | Average Speed (mph) |
|---|---|---|---|
| 1956-21 | Curtis Turner | Ford | 54.987 |
| 1957-09 | Joe Weatherly | Ford | 55.325 |
| 1957-35 | Billy Myers | Ford | 54.987 |
| 1958-08 | Curtis Turner | Ford | 47.362 |
| 1958-18 | Bob Welborn | Chevrolet | 45.196 |
