= Columbia Speedway =

Auto racing venue in South Carolina

Coordinates: 33°57′30″N 81°04′40″W

Columbia Speedway is an oval racetrack located in Cayce, a suburb of Columbia, South Carolina. It was the site of auto races for NASCAR's top series from 1951 through 1971. For most of its history, the racing surface was dirt. The races in April and August 1970 were two of the final three NASCAR Grand National races ever held on a dirt track. The track was paved before hosting its last two Grand National races in 1971.

The track also hosted 8 NASCAR Convertible Series races between 1956 and 1959, Richard Petty's lone win in the series was at Columbia Speedway. The speedway also hosted 4 NASCAR Grand National East Series events.

In 2009, an effort to reclaim the property for historic gatherings was made by Jeff Gilder, founder of Racersreunion.com. In February 2009, a small group of volunteers met to clear brush, old cable and trees. From this small group grew a larger all volunteer work force that helped in razing two dilapidated restroom facilities, refurbishing the ticket booth, installing safety caps on the front stretch guardrails, and a safe parking lot. Several area construction companies provided earth moving equipment, which was essential in removing a large mound of dirt blocking the ticket booth. One donated the materials and built an all-aluminum flag stand at the start-finish line. During the final weeks leading up to the festival, different volunteer crews could be found from sun up to sun down, seven days a week. No help was turned away in the spirit of making this a community project. Saturday volunteers were treated to a meat and three vegetable lunch provided by Lizards Thicket, a local eatery, and delivered by John Wise and Rebecca Turner of Love Chevrolet, the event's sponsor. The first gathering was April 25. Over 30,000 fans from 17 states attended the "First Annual Historic Columbia Speedway Spring Festival". The second annual event was held on April 14–17, 2010.
