= List of 1952 motorsport champions =

1952 motorsport champions
| Previous: 1951 | Next: 1953 |

This list of 1952 motorsport champions is a list of national or international auto racing series with a Championship decided by the points or positions earned by a driver from multiple races.

== Motorcycle racing ==
| Series | Rider | Season article |
|---|---|---|
| 500cc World Championship | (Italy) Umberto Masetti | 1952 Grand Prix motorcycle racing season |
| 350cc World Championship | (United Kingdom) Geoff Duke | 1952 Grand Prix motorcycle racing season |
| 250cc World Championship | (Italy) Enrico Lorenzetti | 1952 Grand Prix motorcycle racing season |
| 125cc World Championship | (United Kingdom) Cecil Sandford | 1952 Grand Prix motorcycle racing season |
| Sidecars World Championship | (United Kingdom) Cyril Smith (United Kingdom) Bob Clements (United Kingdom) Les Nutt | 1952 Grand Prix motorcycle racing season |
| Motocross European Championship | (Belgium) Victor Leloup | 1952 Motocross European Championship |
| Speedway World Championship | (Australia) Jack Young | 1952 Individual Speedway World Championship |
| AMA Grand National Championship | (United States) Bobby Hill | |

== Open wheel racing ==
| Series | Driver | Season article |
|---|---|---|
| World Championship of Drivers | (Italy) Alberto Ascari | 1952 Formula One season |
| AAA National Championship | (United States) Chuck Stevenson | 1952 AAA Championship Car season |
| NASCAR Speedway Division | (United States) Buck Baker | 1952 NASCAR Speedway Division |
Formula Two
| East German Formula Two Championship | (East Germany) Edgar Barth | 1952 German Formula Two Championship |
| West German Formula Two Championship | (West Germany) Toni Ulmen | 1952 German Formula Two Championship |
| French Formula Two Championship | (Italy) Alberto Ascari | |
Formula Three
| British Formula Three Championship | (United Kingdom) Don Parker | 1952 British Formula Three Championship |
| East German Formula Three Championship | (East Germany) Willy Lehmann | 1952 East German Formula Three Championship |
| West German Formula Three Championship | (West Germany) Hellmut Deutz | 1952 West German Formula Three Championship |

== Sports car and GT ==
| Series | Driver | Season article |
|---|---|---|
| SCCA National Sports Car Championship | (United States) Sherwood Johnston | 1952 SCCA National Sports Car Championship |

== Stock car racing ==
| Series | Driver | Season article |
|---|---|---|
| NASCAR Grand National Series | (United States) Tim Flock | 1952 NASCAR Grand National Series |
| NASCAR Grand National Series | Manufacturers: (United States) Hudson | 1952 NASCAR Grand National Series |
| AAA Stock Car National Championship | (United States) Marshall Teague | 1952 AAA Stock Car National Championship |
| Turismo Carretera | (Argentina) Juan Gálvez | 1952 Turismo Carretera |

== See also ==
- List of motorsport championships
- Auto racing
