= 1953 NASCAR Speedway Division =

American motorsport season

1953 NASCAR Speedway Division season
- NASCAR Speedway Division

Season
- Races: 3
- Start date: June 12
- End date: June 28

Awards
- Champion: (Ohio) Pete Allen

The 1953 NASCAR Speedway Division consisted of three races, beginning in Greensboro, North Carolina on June 12 and concluding in Fayetteville, North Carolina on June 28. There were also two non-championship events. The season champion was Pete Allen. This was the final season of the NASCAR Speedway Division. Every driver was American racecar driver and every race in the USA.

== Schedule ==
| Rnd | Date | Race Name | Length | Track | Location | Type | Winning driver |
|---|---|---|---|---|---|---|---|
| NC | February 12 | (Florida) Daytona Beach Time Trial | 2 miles (3.2 km) | Daytona Beach Road Course | Daytona Beach, Florida | Sand | (South Carolina) Buck Baker |
| 1 | June 12 | (North Carolina) Greensboro 25 | 8.333 miles (13.411 km) | Greensboro Agricultural Fairgrounds | Greensboro, North Carolina | Dirt | (New Jersey) Wally Campbell |
| 2 | June 14 | (Virginia) Martinsville 25 | 12.5 miles (20.1 km) | Martinsville Speedway | Martinsville, Virginia | Dirt | (Indiana) Wayne Alspaugh |
| NC | June 27 | (North Carolina) Hickory 30 | 12 miles (19 km) | Hickory Motor Speedway | Hickory, North Carolina | Dirt | (Indiana) Dick Fraizer |
| 3 | June 28 | (North Carolina) Fayetteville 25 | 8.333 miles (13.411 km) | Champion Speedway | Fayetteville, North Carolina | Paved | (Ohio) Pete Allen |

Paved/Dirt Oval
Beach Track
Non-championship race

== Final points standings ==
| # | Driver | Team | Car | Points |
|---|---|---|---|---|
| 1 | (Ohio) Pete Allen | | | 333 |
| 2 | (New York (state)) Ralph Liguori | | Lincoln Special | 330 |
| 3 | (Washington, D.C.) Al Fleming | J. B. Siegfred | Hudson Special | 312 |
| 4 | (North Carolina) Mickey Fenn | Leland Colvin | Ford Special | 292 |
| 5 | (Georgia (U.S. state)) Tex Keene | Al Wheatley | Mercury Special | 277 |
| 6 | (Missouri) Red Amick | | | 243 |
| 7 | (Indiana) Wayne Alspaugh | | | 230 |
| 8 | (Indiana) Tom Cherry | Cherry | Mercury Special | 190 |
| 9 | (New York (state)) Al Keller | W. W. Burroughs | Cadillac Special | 180 |
| 10 | (North Carolina) Jimmy Thompson | Bob Colvin | Ford Special | 169 |

== See also ==
- 1953 in NASCAR
- 1953 AAA Championship Car season
