= List of 1953 motorsport champions =

1953 motorsport champions
Previous: 1952	Next: 1954

This list of 1953 motorsport champions is a list of national or international auto racing series with a Championship decided by the points or positions earned by a driver from multiple races.

== Motorcycle racing ==
Series	Rider	Season article
500cc World Championship	(United Kingdom) Geoff Duke	1953 Grand Prix motorcycle racing season
350cc World Championship	(United Kingdom) Fergus Anderson	1953 Grand Prix motorcycle racing season
250cc World Championship	(West Germany) Werner Haas	1953 Grand Prix motorcycle racing season
125cc World Championship	(West Germany) Werner Haas	1953 Grand Prix motorcycle racing season
Speedway World Championship	(United Kingdom) Freddie Williams	1953 Individual Speedway World Championship
Motocross European Championship	(Belgium) Auguste Mingels	1953 Motocross European Championship

== Open wheel racing ==
Series	Driver	Season article
Formula One World Championship	(Italy) Alberto Ascari	1953 Formula One season
AAA National Championship	(United States) Sam Hanks	1953 AAA Championship Car season
NASCAR Speedway Division	(United States) Pete Allen	1953 NASCAR Speedway Division
Formula Three
British Formula Three Championship	(United Kingdom) Don Parker	
East German Formula Three Championship	(East Germany) Willy Lehmann	1953 East German Formula Three Championship
West German Formula Three Championship	(Germany) Adolf Lang	1953 West German Formula Three Championship

== Rallying ==
Series	Drivers	Season article
European Rally Championship	(Germany) Helmut Polensky	1953 European Rally Championship
European Rally Championship	Co-Drivers: (Germany) Walter Schlüter	1953 European Rally Championship

== Sports car and GT ==
Series	Driver	Season article
World Sportscar Championship	(Italy) Ferrari	1953 World Sportscar Championship
SCCA National Sports Car Championship	(United States) Bill Spear	1953 SCCA National Sports Car Championship

== Stock car racing ==
Series	Driver	Season article
NASCAR Grand National Series	(United States) Herb Thomas	1953 NASCAR Grand National Series
NASCAR Grand National Series	Manufacturers: (United States) Hudson	1953 NASCAR Grand National Series
AAA Stock Car National Championship	(United States) Frank Mundy	1953 AAA Stock Car National Championship
ARCA Racing Series	(United States) Jim Romine	1953 ARCA Racing Series
Turismo Carretera	(Argentina) Oscar Alfredo Gálvez	1953 Turismo Carretera

== See also ==
- List of motorsport championships
- Auto racing
