= Cotton Priddy =

Racecar driver from Kentucky

- Born: August 29, 1928; Louisville, Kentucky, United States
- Died: June 10, 1956 (aged 27); LeHi, Arkansas, United States
- Cause of death: Race-related crash

NASCAR Cup Series career
- 3 races run over 2 years
- Best finish: 131st - 1953 NASCAR Grand National season
- First race: 1953 untitled race (Daytona Beach Road Course)
- Last race: 1956 untitled race (Memphis-Arkansas Speedway)
Wins	Top tens	Poles
0	0	0

Thomas "Cotton" Priddy (August 29, 1928 – June 10, 1956) was a NASCAR Grand National race car driver from Louisville, Kentucky, USA.

Priddy died racing at the Memphis-Arkansas Speedway on June 10, 1956. On the 39th lap of the race, his Chevy sideswiped another driver and flipped down the dirt. Priddy was thrown clear from his car, he suffered multiple fractures and died about an hour after the accident occurred in a West Memphis, Arkansas hospital. The race was not stopped and was won by driver Ralph Moody. The qualifying of race itself was already marred by the death of another driver, Clint McHugh.

== Career ==
Priddy was posthumously awarded $50 in winnings ($592.11 when considering inflation) from his final race. Previously, he raced twice in the 1953 season. With zero finishes in the top-ten, Priddy had only 73 laps of experience. Earning only a grand total of $125 at the time of his death ($1,480.26 when considering inflation), his earnings were paltry even back in those days.

Priddy's best finishes were on road courses with an average finish of 20th place; his average finish on dirt tracks was 28th place.
