= 1954 Mid-South 250 =

Auto race held at Memphis-Arkansas Speedway in 1954

Coordinates: 35°8.31486′N 90°18.9617′W

Race details
- Race 35 of 37 in the 1954 NASCAR Grand National Series season
- Date: October 10, 1954
- Official name: Wilkes County 160
- Location: Memphis-Arkansas Speedway (LeHi, Arkansas)
- Course: Permanent racing facility
- Course length: 1.500 miles (2.414 km)
- Distance: 167 laps, 250.5 mi (403.1 km)
- Weather: Very hot with temperatures of 88 °F (31 °C); wind speeds of 15.9 miles per hour (25.6 km/h)
- Average speed: 89.013 miles per hour (143.253 km/h)
- Attendance: 12,000

Pole position
Driver	Junior Johnson	Paul Whiteman

Most laps led
Driver	Lee Petty	Petty Enterprises
- Laps: 150

Winner
No. 87	Buck Baker	Bob Griffith

Television in the United States
- Network: untelevised
- Announcers: none

The 1954 Mid-South 250 was a NASCAR Grand National Series event that was held on October 10, 1954, at Memphis-Arkansas Speedway in LeHi, Arkansas.

The race car drivers still had to commute to the races using the same stock cars that competed in a typical weekend's race through a policy of homologation (and under their own power). This policy was in effect until roughly 1975. By 1980, NASCAR had completely stopped tracking the year model of all the vehicles and most teams did not take stock cars to the track under their own power anymore.

== Race report ==
One hundred and sixty seven laps were raced on a dirt track spanning 1.500 miles (2.414 km). Twelve thousand people would attend this live untelevised race where Buck Baker would win in his 1954 Oldsmobile vehicle by approximately 5 laps over Dick Rathmann. Other notable competitors included Lee Petty (who led 150 laps which was considered to be the most laps), Marvin Panch, Jimmie Lewallen, Arden Mounts, and Junior Johnson. The average speed of the race was 89.013 miles per hour (143.253 km/h) and the race took two hours, forty-eight minutes, and fifty-one seconds to complete. This event was the 35th race out of 37 in the 1954 Grand National season. Even though it was advertised as a 250-mile race, the actual distance of the race was 250.5 miles (403.1 km).

Buck Baker may not have dominated this race, but he got the win. Of course, Lee Petty would go on to win the championship, even though he finished 3rd in this race. This was the first NASCAR Grand National Series race to take place on a mile-and-a-half track; which would be defined in modern NASCAR standards as a generic "cookie cutter" track. Charles Merrill, a one-off driver from Mobile, Alabama drove the #90 vehicle to a 23rd-place finish; he would never race in the NASCAR Grand National Cup Series again after this race.

One of the major sponsors of the race was for the gasoline brand Pure; which is now a defunct oil company that services ten Southern states as a cooperative. Vapor lock from the fuels being used in the NASCAR Cup Series back then led to the elimination of three drivers from the race (John Erickson, Bud Harless, and Charles Brinkley). Ever since NASCAR has made the use of fuel injection mandatory in all of their Cup Series vehicles, the vapor lock problem has been solved permanently.

Richard Jones achieved the race's last-place finish due to a crash on the first lap of the race. Lloyd Chick, Bo Fields, Hooker Hood, Jim McLain, Dutch Munsinger, Roscoe Rann, Leland Sewell and Robert Slensby would make their NASCAR Grand National Series debut at this event. Charles Brinkley, Laird Bruner, Herschel Buchanan, and Frank Smith would depart from professional stock car racing after this event. Bud Chaddock, John Erickson, Charles Hardiman, Richard Jones, Harold Lutz, and Lucky Walters would make their NASCAR appearance at this race.

Robert Foster was responsible for maintaining Junior Johnson's vehicle during the race while Lee Petty his own crew chief during the race.

=== Timeline ===
Section reference:

- Start: Junior Johnson starts the race with the pole position.
- Lap 1: Lee Petty took over the lead from Junior Johnson; Richard Jones got himself involved in a terminal crash and had to leave the race.
- Lap 10: Junior Johnson's vehicle had a piston that stopped working, ending his race weekend.
- Lap 11: Harold Lutz' vehicle had a piston that stopped working, ending his race weekend.
- Lap 18: Dave Terrell did something bad to his engine; Lucky Walters would lose the frame of his vehicle at roughly the same time.
- Lap 27: A piston stopped working on Jim Paschal's vehicle, ending his chances at a respectable finish.
- Lap 31: A gasket problem forced Jim Reed into the proverbial sidelines.
- Lap 33: A tie rod problem managed to bring Rosco Rann behind the wall for the remainder of the race.
- Lap 43: Steering issues caused Ray Duhigg to end his racing weekend a bit too soon.
- Lap 46: Dutch Munsinger had to leave the race due to a faulty transmission.
- Lap 51: Charles Brinkley developed vapor lock problems with his vehicle.
- Lap 55: Bud Harless had the same vapor lock issues that Brinkley had on lap 51.
- Lap 61: Arden Mounts' suffered from a problematic gasket.
- Lap 62: Transmission problems brought Laird Brunner's race to a premature halt.
- Lap 66: A spindle issue ended Bud Chaddock's day on the track.
- Lap 68: Jimmy Ayers had a problem with his vehicle's gasket, ending his day on the track.
- Lap 74: Johnny Patterson's fuel line became faulty.
- Lap 84: Leland Sewell was involved in a terminal crash and had to leave the race.
- Lap 92: The rear end of Joel Million's vehicle came off, forcing him to finish in a mediocre 34th place.
- Lap 99: Joe Eubanks' vehicle ended up with a faulty fuel line, ending his day on the track.
- Lap 137: John Erickson's vehicle suddenly had vapor lock issues.
- Lap 147: Eric Erickson had piston troubles, forcing him out of the race.
- Lap 151: Buck Baker took over the lead from Lee Petty.
- Lap 161: Lee Petty's vehicle developed a problematic axle.
- Finish: Buck Baker was officially declared the winner of the event.

Preceded by none	Mid-South 250 races 1954–1955	Succeeded by 1955 Mid-South 250

Previous race: 1954 NASCAR Grand National Series race at Langhorne Speedway (September)	NASCAR Grand National Series; 1954 season	Next race: 1954 NASCAR Grand National Series race at Martinsville Speedway (October)
