= 1955 Mid-South 250 =

Auto race held at Memphis-Arkansas Speedway in 1955

Coordinates: 35°8.31486′N 90°18.9617′W

Race details
- Race 33 of 45 in the 1955 NASCAR Grand National Series season
- Date: August 14, 1955
- Official name: Mid-South 250
- Location: Memphis-Arkansas Speedway (LeHi, Arkansas)
- Course: Permanent racing facility
- Course length: 1.500 miles (3.000 km)
- Distance: 160 laps, 250.1 mi (402.8 km)
- Weather: Hot with temperatures of 89.1 °F (31.7 °C); wind speeds of 12 miles per hour (19 km/h)
- Average speed: 89.982 miles per hour (144.812 km/h)
- Attendance: 15,000

Pole position
Driver	Fonty Flock	Carl Keikhaefer

Most laps led
Driver	Fonty Flock	Carl Keikhaefer
- Laps: 88

Winner
No. 301	Fonty Flock	Carl Keikhaefer

The 1955 Mid-South 250 was a NASCAR Grand National Series event that was held on August 14, 1955, at the Memphis-Arkansas Speedway in LeHi, Arkansas.

The race car drivers still had to commute to the races using the same stock cars that competed in a typical weekend's race through a policy of homologation (and under their own power). This policy was in effect until roughly 1975. By 1980, NASCAR had completely stopped tracking the year model of all the vehicles and most teams did not take stock cars to the track under their own power anymore.

== Race report ==
One hundred and sixty-seven laps were done on a dirt oval track spanning 1.500 miles (2.414 km). There were no cautions and the time of the race was two hours, forty-seven minutes, and twelve seconds. The average speed was 89.982 miles per hour (144.812 km/h) while the pole position speed was 99.944 miles per hour (160.844 km/h). Fifteen thousand people attended this live and completely untelevised race. Total winnings for this race were $10,625 ($127,698 when adjusted for inflation) with the winner receiving $2,950 ($35,455 when adjusted for inflation).

Fonty Flock managed to break his brother's eight-race pole streak. However, Tim Flock qualified in second place for this race. Fonty would eventually win the race in his 1955 Chrysler C-300 but Tim would finish in third place (one position worse than he started in). Speeds achieved during qualifying range from 77.9 miles per hour (125.4 km/h) to 99.9 miles per hour (160.8 km/h); with most drivers being able to do a qualifying lap in less than 60 seconds.

Lee Petty was knocked out of the race due to problem with his car's U joint; causing Petty to lose the point lead during the race. It was the first time he didn't lead the point standings since the 10th race of 1954, a 59-race streak. Jimmie Lewallen was forced out of the race due to a broken gas line. Ted Cannady and Banks Simpson would make their NASCAR debuts at this racing event while Ken Johns and Jim McLain would end their NASCAR careers here. No record pertaining to the points system used in NASCAR was recorded for this event.

Smokey Yunick and Carl Kiekhaefer were two of the most notable crew chiefs to attend this race; Yunick attended to Herb Thomas' car while Carl helped to service Tim Flock's vehicle.

=== Qualifying ===
Grid	No.	Driver	Manufacturer	Speed	Qualifying time	Owner
1	301	Fonty Flock	'55 Chrysler	99.944	54.030	Carl Kiekhaefer
2	300	Tim Flock	'55 Chrysler	99.265	54.400	Carl Kiekhaefer
3	89	Buck Baker	'55 Buick	95.711	56.420	Buck Baker
4	8	Billy Carden	'55 Buick	95.457	56.570	Bishop Brothers
5	78	Jim Paschal	'55 Oldsmobile	95.322	56.650	Ernest Woods
6	87	Speedy Thompson	'54 Oldsmobile	95.070	56.800	Bob Griffin
7	44	Bob Welborn	'55 Chevrolet	94.273	57.280	Julian Petty
8	55	Junior Johnson	'55 Oldsmobile	93.701	57.630	Jim Lowe (NASCAR) / Carl Beckham
9	98	Dave Terrell	'55 Oldsmobile	92.672	58.720	Dave Terrell
10	23	Ken Johns	'55 Chevrolet	92.260	58.530	unknown

=== Finishing order ===
Section reference:

1. Fonty Flock† (No. 301)
2. Speedy Thompson† (No. 80)
3. Tim Flock† (No. 300)
4. Jim Paschal† (No. 78)
5. Buck Baker† (No. 89)
6. Bob Welborn† (No. 44)
7. Junior Johnson† (No. 55)
8. Slick Smith† (No. 14)
9. Jimmy Ayers (No. 3)
10. Ken Johns (No. 23)
11. Dave Terrell (No. 98)
12. Eddie Skinner† (No. 28)
13. Joe Guide (No. 52)
14. Herb Thomas† (No. 92)
15. Ted Cannady (No. 32)
16. Banks Simpson† (No. 20)
17. Gene Simpson (No. 40)
18. Al Watkins† (No. 33)
19. Lee Petty*† (No. 42)
20. Roscoe Rann† (No. 155)
21. Jimmie Lewallen*† (No. 88)
22. Jim McLain† (No. 39)
23. Hooker Hood*† (No. 188)
24. Jack Hubbard*† (No. 51-X)
25. Harold Kite*† (No. 71)
26. Woodie Wilson*† (No. 90)
27. Billy Carden*† (No. 8)
28. Gordon Smith*† (No. 19)
29. Gwyn Staley*† (No. 56)

* Driver failed to finish race
† signifies that the driver is known to be deceased

== Timeline ==
Section reference:

- Start of race: Fonty Flock started the race with the pole position.
- Lap 3: Gwyn Staley became the last place finisher due to faulty bearings.
- Lap 5: Gordon Smith's engine blew, which ended his race weekend a bit too soon.
- Lap 11: Billy Carden noticed that the bearings on his vehicle were acting funny; forcing him to end his race weekend early.
- Lap 18: Tim Flock takes over the lead from Fonty Flock; Woodie Wilson managed to overheat his vehicle.
- Lap 23: Harold Kite had troubles with his pistons, ending his race weekend prematurely.
- Lap 56: Jack Hubbard experienced enough problems with his push rod to not finish the event.
- Lap 65: The push rod on Hooker Hood's vehicle became problematic, preventing him from finishing the race.
- Lap 96: Jimmie Lewallen's gas line no longer worked properly, making him exit the event prematurely.
- Lap 97: Fonty Flock takes over the lead from Tim Flock.
- Lap 135: Lee Petty's vehicle developed a problematic U-joint, forcing him to leave the race.
- Finish: Fonty Flock was officially declared the winner of the event.

Preceded by 1954 Mid-South 250	Mid-South 250 races 1954-1955	Succeeded by none
