= List of 1949 motorsport champions =

1949 motorsport champions
Previous: 1948	Next: 1950

This list of 1949 motorsport champions is a list of national or international auto racing series with a Championship decided by the points or positions earned by a driver from multiple races

== Motorcycle racing ==
Series	Rider	Season article
500cc World Championship	(United Kingdom) Leslie Graham	1949 Grand Prix motorcycle racing season
500cc World Championship	Constructors: (United Kingdom) AJS	1949 Grand Prix motorcycle racing season
350cc World Championship	(United Kingdom) Freddie Frith	1949 Grand Prix motorcycle racing season
250cc World Championship	(Italy) Bruno Ruffo	1949 Grand Prix motorcycle racing season
125cc World Championship	(Italy) Nello Pagani	1949 Grand Prix motorcycle racing season
125cc World Championship	Constructors: (Italy) Mondial	1949 Grand Prix motorcycle racing season
Speedway World Championship	(United Kingdom) Tommy Price	1949 Individual Speedway World Championship

== Open wheel racing ==
Series	Driver	Season article
AAA National Championship	(United States) Johnnie Parsons	1949 AAA Championship Car season
German Small Car Championship	(Germany) Walter Komossa	

== Stock car racing ==
Series	Driver	Season article
NASCAR Strictly Stock	(United States) Red Byron	1949 NASCAR Strictly Stock Series
American Stock Car Racing Association	(United States) Wally Campbell	
Turismo Carretera	(Argentina) Juan Gálvez	1949 Turismo Carretera

== See also ==
- List of motorsport championships
- Auto racing
