= 1955 Wilkes 160 =

Former NASCAR race

Race details
- Race 44 of 45 in the 1955 NASCAR Grand National Series season
- North Wilkesboro Speedway
- Date: October 23, 1955
- Official name: Wilkes 160
- Location: North Wilkesboro Speedway, North Wilkesboro, North Carolina
- Course: Permanent racing facility
- Course length: 1.00 km (0.625 miles)
- Distance: 160 laps, 100 mi (160 km)
- Weather: Mild with temperatures approaching 70 °F (21 °C); wind speeds up to 11.1 miles per hour (17.9 km/h)
- Average speed: 72.347 miles per hour (116.431 km/h)
- Attendance: 10,000

Pole position
Driver	Buck Baker	Pete DePaolo

Most laps led
Driver	Buck Baker	Pete DePaolo
- Laps: 160

Winner
No. 87	Buck Baker	Pete DePaolo

Television in the United States
- Network: untelevised
- Announcers: none

The 1955 Wilkes 160 was a NASCAR Grand National Series event that was held on October 23, 1955, at the North Wilkesboro Speedway in North Wilkesboro, North Carolina.

== Summary ==
One hundred and sixty laps were competed on a dirt oval track spanning .625 miles (1.006 km). There were three cautions delivered down by NASCAR officials and the race lasted exactly one hour, twenty-one minutes, and sixteen seconds. Buck Baker defeated Lee Petty by a time of three seconds. Ford would make its first Grand National Series win at this speedway; making it a viable competitor against Dodge, Chevrolet and Chrysler. The average speed was 72.347 miles per hour (116.431 km/h) while the pole position speed was 79.815 miles per hour (128.450 km/h). Ten thousand people attended this autumn race. This race would produce Joe Weatherly's first finish in the top five. Most of the drivers in this racing event were driver-owners who owned their own racing vehicle and drove their vehicle directly to the races instead of towing it from hundreds of miles away.

All the drivers in this event were racing for a prize purse that totalled $4,285 ($50,296.85 when adjusted for inflation). Only 20 of the 28 competing drivers would gain financially from this race; with individual earnings that ranged from $1,110 ($13,029.06 when adjusted for inflation) to a paltry $50 for the NASCAR drivers who finished in 13th place through 20th place ($586.89 when adjusted for inflation). No financial compensation was given to the participants who finished in the bottom 9 due to NASCAR's limited budget for prize winnings in an era prior to "big money" sponsors like Sprint Nextel and the R.J. Reynolds Tobacco Company.

Carl Kiekhaefer was one of the notable crew chiefs on attendance for this race; he helped to service Tim Flock's racing vehicle.

=== Qualifying ===
Grid	No.	Driver	Manufacturer	Qualifying Speed
1	87	Buck Baker	'56 Ford	79.815 mph
2	92	Herb Thomas	'55 Chevrolet	
3	98	Marvin Panch	'56 Ford	
4	42	Lee Petty	'55 Dodge	
5	B-29	Dink Widenhouse	'56 Ford	
6	301	Fonty Flock	'55 Chrysler	
7	99	Curtis Turner	'56 Ford	
8	49	Bob Welborn	'55 Chevrolet	
9	9	Joe Weatherly	'56 Ford	
10	20	Speedy Thompson	'55 Chrysler	

=== Results ===
Pos	Grid	Car #	Driver	Owner	Make	Laps	Laps led	Status	Winnings
1	1	87	Buck Baker†	Pete DePaolo	'56 Ford	160	160	Running	$1,100
2	4	42	Lee Petty†	Petty Enterprises	'55 Dodge	160	0	Running	$700
3	12	2	Gwyn Staley†	Hubert Westmoreland	'55 Chevrolet	159	0	Running	$475
4	9	9	Joe Weatherly†	Charlie Schwam	'56 Ford	159	0	Running	$365
5	11	300	Tim Flock†	Carl Kiekhaefer	'55 Chrysler	159	0	Running	$310
6	6	301	Fonty Flock†	Carl Kiekhaefer	'55 Chrysler	159	0	Running	$250
7	10	20	Speedy Thompson†	Carl Kiekhaefer	'55 Chrysler	157	0	Running	$200
8	5	B-29	Dink Widenhouse	Dink Widenhouse	'56 Ford	157	0	Running	$150
9	19	198	Dave Terrell	Dave Terrell	'55 Oldsmobile	156	0	Running	$100
10	16	44	Jim Paschal†	Julian Petty	'55 Chevrolet	154	0	Running	$100
11	17	04	Jimmy Massey	Hubert Westmoreland	'55 Chevrolet	154	0	Running	$75
12	18	88	Jimmie Lewallen†	Ernest Woods	'55 Oldsmobile	151	0	Running	$60
13	8	49	Bob Welborn†	Bob Welborn	'55 Chevrolet	145	0	Running	$50
14	23	24	Bobby Waddell	Jimmy Pardue	'55 Chevrolet	138	0	Running	$50
15	27	460	Ed Cole	Brooks Brothers	'55 Plymouth	136	0	Running	$50
16	24	28	Eddie Skinner	Frank Dodge	'53 Oldsmobile	132	0	Running	$50
17	25	27	John McVitty†	John McVitty	'55 Chevrolet	128	0	Wheel	$50
18	15	5	Ralph Liguori†	Ralph Liguori	'55 Buick	127	0	Stalled	$50
19	13	22	Bill Blair†	Bill Blair	'55 Oldsmobile	127	0	RF Hub	$50
20	7	99	Curtis Turner†	Charlie Schwam	'56 Ford	103	0	RF Hub	$50
21	2	92	Herb Thomas†	Herb Thomas	'55 Chevrolet	90	0	Crash	No Payout
22	21	89	Ned Jarrett	Ned Jarrett	'55 Buick	70	0	Fuel Pump	No Payout
23	3	98	Marvin Panch	Pete DePaolo	'56 Ford	50	0	Overheating	No Payout
24	14	70	Joe Eubanks†	Lancaster Brothers	'55 Chevrolet	40	0	Steering	No Payout
25	22	20	Banks Simpson	Banks Simpson	'55 Buick	40	0	Radiator	No Payout
26	20	55	Junior Johnson	Jim Lowe & Carl Beckham	'55 Oldsmobile	35	0	Bumper	No Payout
27	28	9A	Tom Pistone	Tom Pistone	'55 Chevrolet	28	0	Overheating	No Payout
28	26	71	Ted Cannady	Ted Cannady	'55 Oldsmobile	25	0	Steering	No Payout

† signifies that the driver is known to be deceased

==== Race summary ====
- Lead changes: 0
- Cautions: 3
- Red flags: N/A
- Time of race: 1:21:16
- Average speed: 72.347
- Margin of Victory: 5 seconds

== Timeline ==
Section reference:

- Start of race: Buck Baker started the race with the pole position.
- Lap 25: Ted Cannady's steering became problematic, sealing his last-place finish in the race.
- Lap 28: Tom Pistone's vehicle overheated, forcing him to exit the race prematurely.
- Lap 35: The bumper on Junior Johnson's vehicle fell off, damaging his vehicle and forcing him to exit the race prematurely.
- Lap 40: Banks Simpson's radiator went berserk; Joe Eubanks' steering stopped working properly.
- Lap 50: Marvin Panch's vehicle overheated while he was racing.
- Lap 70: Ned Jarrett's fuel pump became problematic while he was driving the vehicle.
- Lap 90: Herb Thomas had a terminal crash, forcing him to retire from the race.
- Lap 103: The RF hub on Curtis Turner developed problems.
- Lap 127: Ralph Liguori's vehicle stalled on the track; Bill Blair had some problems with his RF hub.
- Lap 128: A wheel came off of John McVitty's vehicle, forcing him out of the race.
- Finish: Buck Baker was officially declared the winner of the event.
