= 1952 NASCAR Speedway Division =

Sporting event

1952 NASCAR Speedway Division season
- NASCAR Speedway Division

Season
- Races: 7
- Start date: May 10
- End date: June 29

Awards
- Champion: (South Carolina) Buck Baker

The 1952 NASCAR Speedway Division consisted of seven races, beginning in Darlington, South Carolina on May 10 and concluding in Langhorne, Pennsylvania on June 29. There was also one non-championship event in Daytona Beach, Florida. The season champion was Buck Baker. This was the first season of the NASCAR Speedway Division. Every driver was an American racecar driver and every race was in the USA.

== Schedule ==
Rnd	Date	Race name	Length	Track	Location	Type	Pole position	Winning driver
NC	February 6	(Florida) Daytona Beach Time Trial	1 mile (1.6 km)	Daytona Beach Road Course	Daytona Beach, Florida	Sand	—	(South Carolina) Buck Baker
1	May 10	(South Carolina) Darlington 200	200 miles (320 km)	Darlington Raceway	Darlington, South Carolina	Paved	(North Carolina) Speedy Thompson	(South Carolina) Buck Baker
2	May 25	(Virginia) Martinsville 150	75 miles (121 km)	Martinsville Speedway	Martinsville, Virginia	Dirt	(Tennessee) Bill Miller	(Georgia (U.S. state)) Tex Keene
3	May 30	(New York (state)) Rochester 100	100 miles (160 km)	Monroe County Fairgrounds	Rochester, New York	Dirt	(Indiana) Tom Cherry	(New Jersey) Wally Campbell
4	June 1	(North Carolina) Charlotte 100	101.25 miles (162.95 km)	Charlotte Speedway	Charlotte, North Carolina	Dirt	(Washington, D.C.) Al Fleming	(New Jersey) Wally Campbell
5	June 8	(Georgia (U.S. state)) Atlanta 100	100 miles (160 km)	Lakewood Speedway	Atlanta, Georgia	Dirt	(New Jersey) Wally Campbell	(New York (state)) Al Keller
6	June 15	(Pennsylvania) Heidelberg 100	100 miles (160 km)	Heidelberg Raceway	Pittsburgh, Pennsylvania	Dirt	(New Jersey) Wally Campbell	(Indiana) Tom Cherry
7	June 29	(Pennsylvania) Langhorne 100	100 miles (160 km)	Langhorne Speedway	Langhorne, Pennsylvania	Dirt	(Indiana) Tom Cherry	(Indiana) Tom Cherry

Paved/Dirt Oval
Beach Track
Non-championship race

== Final points standings ==
#	Driver	Team	Car	Points
1	(South Carolina) Buck Baker	Penny Mullis	Cadillac Special	1734
2	(New Jersey) Wally Campbell	Campbell	Ford Special	1517
3	(Georgia (U.S. state)) Tex Keene	Al Wheatley	Mercury Special	1266
4	(Tennessee) Bill Miller	Raymond Parks	Oldsmobile 88 Special	1251
5	(Indiana) Tom Cherry	Cherry	Mercury Special	1210
6	(North Carolina) Mickey Fenn	Leland Colvin	Ford Special	1126
7	(Florida) Gene Darragh	Leland Colvin	Ford Special	1098
8	(New York (state)) Lyle Scott	Scott	DeSoto Special	1041
9	(North Carolina) Sam Waldrop	Al Conrow	Hudson Special	1024
10	(Georgia (U.S. state)) Jack Smith	Roy Shoemaker	Chrysler Special	914

== See also ==
- 1952 in NASCAR
- 1952 AAA Championship Car season
