= List of 1956 motorsport champions =

1956 motorsport champions
Previous: 1955	Next: 1957

This list of 1956 motorsport champions is a list of national or international auto racing series with a Championship decided by the points or positions earned by a driver from multiple races.

== Motorcycle racing ==
Series	Rider	Season article
500cc World Championship	(United Kingdom) John Surtees	1956 Grand Prix motorcycle racing season
350cc World Championship	(United Kingdom) Bill Lomas	1956 Grand Prix motorcycle racing season
250cc World Championship	(Italy) Carlo Ubbiali	1956 Grand Prix motorcycle racing season
125cc World Championship	(Italy) Carlo Ubbiali	1956 Grand Prix motorcycle racing season
Motocross European Championship	(United Kingdom) Les Archer Jr.	1956 Motocross European Championship
Speedway World Championship	(Sweden) Ove Fundin	1956 Individual Speedway World Championship

== Open wheel racing ==
Series	Driver	Season article
Formula One World Championship	(Argentina) Juan Manuel Fangio	1956 Formula One season
USAC National Championship	(United States) Jimmy Bryan	1956 USAC Championship Car season
Formula Three
BRSCC British Formula Three Championship	(United Kingdom) Jim Russell	1956 BRSCC British Formula Three Championship
East German Formula Three Championship	(East Germany) Willy Lehmann	1956 East German Formula Three Championship

== Rallying ==
Series	Drivers	Season article
European Rally Championship	(Germany) Walter Schock	1956 European Rally Championship
European Rally Championship	Co-Drivers: (Germany) Rolf Moll	1956 European Rally Championship

== Sports car and GT ==
Series	Driver	Season article
World Sportscar Championship	(Italy) Ferrari	1956 World Sportscar Championship
SCCA National Sports Car Championship	C Modified: (United States) Walt Hansgen	1956 SCCA National Sports Car Championship
SCCA National Sports Car Championship	D Modified: (United States) Bill Lloyd	1956 SCCA National Sports Car Championship

== Stock car racing ==
Series	Driver	Season article
NASCAR Grand National Series	(United States) Buck Baker	1956 NASCAR Grand National Series
NASCAR Grand National Series	Manufacturers: (United States) Ford	1956 NASCAR Grand National Series
NASCAR Pacific Coast Late Model Division	(United States) Lloyd Dane	1956 NASCAR Pacific Coast Late Model Division
MARC Racing Series	(United States) Iggy Katona	1956 MARC Racing Series
Turismo Carretera	(Argentina) Juan Gálvez	1956 Turismo Carretera
USAC Stock Car National Championship	(United States) Johnny Mantz	1956 USAC Stock Car Series
USAC Stock Car National Championship	Pacific Coast: (United States) Sam Hanks	1956 USAC Stock Car Series
USAC Stock Car National Championship	Short Track: (United States) Troy Ruttman	1956 USAC Stock Car Series

== See also ==
- List of motorsport championships
- Auto racing
