= Buck Baker's Seat Time American Racing School =

Former NASCAR school

Buck Baker's Seat Time American Racing School (previously the Buck Baker Racing School) was founded in 1980 by Buck Baker, who was a NASCAR Hall of Fame driver and two-time Cup Series champion. It is based in Charlotte, North Carolina.

== Curriculum ==
The school teaches professional racing skills to individuals with an interest in racing, including professional racers and racing enthusiasts. The instructors were all trained by Baker or his son, Buddy.

The curriculum ranges from introductory packages for non-professionals to advanced, one-on-one driver training for professionals or more experienced drivers. Drivers also have the option of choosing a solo driver package or a non-solo driver package. The school adheres to the curriculum established by Baker, which avoids a lead-follow format commonly used in other racing schools. Instead, participants are afforded the opportunity to pass other cars on straight sections of the track while learning fundamental racing techniques such as navigating the racing line, merging onto the track, and entering and exiting pit road.

The courses are held on the following tracks:

- Atlanta Motor Speedway
- Bristol Motor Speedway
- Rockingham Speedway
- Charlotte Motor Speedway

== Cars ==
The school uses retired Chevrolet and Dodge vehicles used in the NASCAR Sprint Cup, Xfinity, and Craftsman Truck Series. Each car weighs approximately 3,400 lb (1,500 kg) and includes 358 cubic-inch engines with up to 500 horsepower.

The achievable speeds during the driving experience vary depending on factors such as the driver's skill level and the characteristics of the track. All of the vehicles are equipped with a 6,000 rpm rev limiter. On larger tracks such as Atlanta, Rockingham, and Charlotte, participants typically reach speeds ranging between 120 and 140mph, while speeds at the Bristol track generally range between 80 and 100mph.

== Notable Graduates Of Buck Baker Racing School ==
NASCAR Drivers
- Bobby Allison
- Dave Blaney
- Mike Bliss
- Todd Bodine
- Jeff Burton
- Ward Burton
- Stacy Compton
- Ricky Craven
- Brendan Gaughan
- Jeff Gordon
- David Green
- Jeff Green
- Bobby Hillin Jr.
- Buckshot Jones
- Jason Keller
- Joe Nemechek
- Ryan Newman
- Steve Park
- Jeff Purvis
- Shawna Robinson
- Hermie Sadler
- Tim Steele
- Tony Stewart
- Randy Tolsma

Other NASCAR Personalities

- Jeff Hammond
- Mike Joy

Other Automobile Racers

- Derek Bell
- Kenny Bräck
- Buzz Calkins
- John Force
- Hurley Haywood
- Lyn St. James
- Danny Sullivan
- Larry "The King" Costa
- Richard Lanson

Other

- Jerry Glanville
- Hank Parker
- Jeff Probst
- Jonnie Stewart
- Ken Stabler
- Travis Tritt
- Robert Porter
