= Banks Simpson =

American racing driver

- Born: November 4, 1916; Concord, North Carolina, U.S.
- Died: April 30, 2009 (aged 92); Concord, North Carolina, U.S.

NASCAR Cup Series career
- 7 races run over 1 year
- Best finish: 23rd (1955)
- First race: 1955 Mid-South 250 (Memphis-Arkansas Speedway)
- Last race: 1955 Wilkes 160 (North Wilkesboro Speedway)
Wins	Top tens	Poles
0	0	0

Banks Simpson (November 4, 1916 – April 30, 2009) was an American NASCAR Grand National Series driver who participated in only the 1955 season.

== Career summary ==
Simpson was a competitor in the 1955 Southern 500, the 1955 Mid-South 250, and the 1955 Wilkes 160. While he never won a race or finished in the top-ten, Simpson would go on to earn $870 in total career earnings ($10,456.21 when adjusted for inflation) along with experiencing 1,376.5 miles (2,215.3 km) of NASCAR Grand National Series racing. The races that he did were in the No. 20 Buick.
