= Memphis-Arkansas Speedway =

Defunct auto race track

Coordinates: 35°8.31486′N 90°18.9617′W

MAS
- Racing image with driving directions
- Location: Bob Ward Township, Crittenden County, near West Memphis, Arkansas (LeHi, Arkansas)
- Capacity: 15,000
- Owner: Clarence Camp, Harold Woolridge and Nat Epstein
- Operator: Clarence Camp, Harold Woolridge and Nat Epstein
- Broke ground: 1953
- Opened: 1954
- Closed: 1957
- Major events: NASCAR Grand National Series

Oval
- Surface: Dirt
- Length: 2.414 km (1.500 mi)
- Turns: 4

The Memphis-Arkansas Speedway was a dirt oval track located just west of West Memphis, Arkansas, United States, in the community of Lehi.

This speedway had a total distance spanning 1.500 miles (2.414 km), and at the time was the longest oval track visited by NASCAR (and the longest dirt oval track to this day). Its elevation is 200 feet above sea level and all races used the Central Time Zone. While the track opened on October 7, 1954, it soon ran out of money. Paving the track cost $100,000 ($1,146,327.01 when adjusted for inflation) because the dirt surface was unmanageable after a certain number of years. As a result, the track was closed permanently in 1957 when it was sold to local farmer Clayton Eubanks Sr., who used the abandoned race track for catfish, rice, and soybeans for a number of years. The proposed Interstate highway that was being built near the abandoned rack track was not finished in time to save it.

Richard Petty and his father Lee both remember the high banking that this race track had. The dirt was used for the banking and two ponds were on opposite ends of the speedway. Lee Petty finished third at the 1954 Mid-South 250 and nineteenth at the 1955 Mid-South 250.

== Racing history ==
The NASCAR Grand National (now the NASCAR Cup) Series would visit this track numerous times during the 1955 and 1956 Grand National seasons. Clint McHugh from Iowa (who tumbled over a guard rail and into a lake 50 feet below the embankment at the age of 28) and Cotton Priddy from Louisville, Kentucky, are the two race car drivers who died on this allegedly dangerous race track. Since the 1960s, the track was never used for its intended purpose of stock car racing. At a race held in November 1954, twelve thousand fans would attend a race spanning 250 miles (400 km) where Buck Baker would end up winning the 1954 running of the Mid-South 250.

Only two named races would be held in this racing venue: 1954 Mid-South 250 and the 1955 Mid-South 250. The Ford Motor Company would earn two wins on this track followed by single race wins earned by Pontiac, Chrysler, and Oldsmobile. Fonty Flock was the only winner on this track to start from the pole position. The highest purse ever offered at this track was $14,250 ($163,351.6 when adjusted for inflation). The largest field to compete on the track was 52 cars, while the smallest was 28.

Other notable drivers who have gained experience racing here included: Chuck Stevenson, Tiny Lund, Bob Flock, and Ralph Moody.
