= List of 1954 motorsport champions =

1954 motorsport champions
Previous: 1953	Next: 1955

This list of 1954 motorsport champions is a list of national or international auto racing series with a Championship decided by the points or positions earned by a driver from multiple races.

== Motorcycle racing ==
Series	Rider	Season article
500cc World Championship	(United Kingdom) Geoff Duke	1954 Grand Prix motorcycle racing season
350cc World Championship	(United Kingdom) Fergus Anderson	1954 Grand Prix motorcycle racing season
250cc World Championship	(West Germany) Werner Haas	1954 Grand Prix motorcycle racing season
125cc World Championship	(Austria) Rupert Hollaus	1954 Grand Prix motorcycle racing season
Speedway World Championship	(New Zealand) Ronnie Moore	1954 Individual Speedway World Championship
Motocross European Championship	(Belgium) Auguste Mingels	1954 Motocross European Championship

== Open wheel racing ==
Series	Driver	Season article
Formula One World Championship	(Argentina) Juan Manuel Fangio	1954 Formula One season
AAA National Championship	(United States) Jimmy Bryan	1954 AAA Championship Car season
Formula Three
BRSCC British Formula Three Championship	(United Kingdom) Les Leston	1954 BRSCC British Formula Three Championship
East German Formula Three Championship	(East Germany) Willy Lehmann	1954 East German Formula Three Championship

== Rallying ==
Series	Drivers	Season article
European Rally Championship	(Germany) Walter Schlüter	1954 European Rally Championship
European Rally Championship	Co-Drivers: (Germany) Siegfried Eikelmann	1954 European Rally Championship

== Sports car and GT ==
Series	Driver	Season article
World Sportscar Championship	(Italy) Ferrari	1954 World Sportscar Championship
SCCA National Sports Car Championship	B Modified: (United States) Jack Ensley	1954 SCCA National Sports Car Championship
SCCA National Sports Car Championship	C Modified: (United States) Jim Kimberly	1954 SCCA National Sports Car Championship

== Stock car racing ==
Series	Driver	Season article
NASCAR Grand National Series	(United States) Lee Petty	1954 NASCAR Grand National Series
NASCAR Grand National Series	Manufacturers: (United States) Hudson	1954 NASCAR Grand National Series
NASCAR Pacific Coast Late Model Division	(United States) Lloyd Dane	1954 NASCAR Pacific Coast Late Model Division
AAA Stock Car National Championship	(United States) Marshall Teague	1954 AAA Stock Car National Championship
MARC Racing Series	(United States) Bucky Sager	1954 MARC Racing Series
Turismo Carretera	(Argentina) Oscar Alfredo Gálvez	1954 Turismo Carretera

== See also ==
- List of motorsport championships
- Auto racing
