= List of 1948 motorsport champions =

1948 motorsport champions
Previous: 1947	Next: 1949

This list of 1948 motorsport champions is a list of national or international auto racing series with a Championship decided by the points or positions earned by a driver from multiple races.

== Open wheel racing ==
Series	Driver	Season article
AAA National Championship	(United States) Ted Horn	1948 AAA Championship Car season
Baycities Outdoor Midget Racing Championship	(United States) Fred Agabashian	
German Small Car Championship	(Germany) Walter Komossa	

== Stock car racing ==
Series	Driver	Season article
Turismo Carretera	(Argentina) Oscar Alfredo Gálvez	1948 Turismo Carretera

== See also ==
- List of motorsport championships
- Auto racing
