= List of 1955 motorsport champions =

1955 motorsport champions
Previous: 1954	Next: 1956

This list of 1955 motorsport champions is a list of national or international auto racing series with a Championship decided by the points or positions earned by a driver from multiple races.

== Motorcycle racing ==
Series	Rider	Season article
500cc World Championship	(United Kingdom) Geoff Duke	1955 Grand Prix motorcycle racing season
350cc World Championship	(United Kingdom) Bill Lomas	1955 Grand Prix motorcycle racing season
250cc World Championship	(West Germany) Hermann Paul Müller	1955 Grand Prix motorcycle racing season
125cc World Championship	(Italy) Carlo Ubbiali	1955 Grand Prix motorcycle racing season
Motocross European Championship	(United Kingdom) John Draper	1955 Motocross European Championship
Speedway World Championship	(United Kingdom) Peter Craven	1955 Individual Speedway World Championship

== Open wheel racing ==
Series	Driver	Season article
Formula One World Championship	(Argentina) Juan Manuel Fangio	1955 Formula One season
AAA National Championship	(United States) Bob Sweikert	1955 AAA Championship Car season
Formula Three
BRSCC British Formula Three Championship	(United Kingdom) Jim Russell	1955 BRSCC British Formula Three Championship
East German Formula Three Championship	(East Germany) Willy Lehmann	1955 East German Formula Three Championship

== Rallying ==
Series	Drivers	Season article
European Rally Championship	(Germany) Werner Engel	1955 European Rally Championship
European Rally Championship	Co-Drivers: (Germany) Gilbert Ambrecht	1955 European Rally Championship

== Sports car and GT ==
Series	Driver	Season article
World Sportscar Championship	(West Germany) Mercedes-Benz	1955 World Sportscar Championship
SCCA National Sports Car Championship	C Modified: (United States) Sherwood Johnston	1955 SCCA National Sports Car Championship
SCCA National Sports Car Championship	D Modified: (United States) Phil Hill	1955 SCCA National Sports Car Championship

== Stock car racing ==
Series	Driver	Season article
NASCAR Grand National Series	(United States) Tim Flock	1955 NASCAR Grand National Series
NASCAR Grand National Series	Manufacturers: (United States) Oldsmobile	1955 NASCAR Grand National Series
NASCAR Pacific Coast Late Model Division	(United States) Danny Letner	1955 NASCAR Pacific Coast Late Model Division
AAA Stock Car National Championship	(United States) Frank Mundy	1955 AAA Stock Car National Championship
MARC Racing Series	(United States) Iggy Katona	1955 MARC Racing Series
Turismo Carretera	(Argentina) Juan Gálvez	1955 Turismo Carretera

== See also ==
- List of motorsport championships
- Auto racing
