= List of 1946 motorsport champions =

1946 motorsport champions
Previous: 1945	Next: 1947

This list of 1946 motorsport champions is a list of national or international auto racing series with a Championship decided by the points or positions earned by a driver from multiple races.

== Open wheel racing ==
Series	Driver	Season article
AAA National Championship	(United States) Ted Horn	1946 AAA Championship Car season

== Stock car racing ==
Series	Driver	Season article
Turismo Carretera	(Argentina) Oscar Alfredo Gálvez	1946 Turismo Carretera

== See also ==
- List of motorsport championships
- Auto racing
