= List of 1951 motorsport champions =

1951 motorsport champions
Previous: 1950	Next: 1952

This list of 1951 motorsport champions is a list of national or international auto racing series with a Championship decided by the points or positions earned by a driver from multiple races.

== Motorcycle racing ==
Series	Rider	Season article
500cc World Championship	(United Kingdom) Geoff Duke	1951 Grand Prix motorcycle racing season
500cc World Championship	Manufacturers: (United Kingdom) Norton	1951 Grand Prix motorcycle racing season
350cc World Championship	(United Kingdom) Geoff Duke	1951 Grand Prix motorcycle racing season
250cc World Championship	(Italy) Bruno Ruffo	1951 Grand Prix motorcycle racing season
125cc World Championship	(Italy) Carlo Ubbiali	1951 Grand Prix motorcycle racing season
125cc World Championship	Manufacturers: (Italy) Mondial	1951 Grand Prix motorcycle racing season
Sidecars World Championship	(United Kingdom) Eric Oliver (Italy) Lorenzo Dobelli	1951 Grand Prix motorcycle racing season
Speedway World Championship	(Australia) Jack Young	1951 Individual Speedway World Championship
AMA Grand National Championship	(United States) Bobby Hill	

== Open wheel racing ==
Series	Driver	Season article
World Championship of Drivers	(Argentina) Juan Manuel Fangio	1951 Formula One season
AAA National Championship	(United States) Tony Bettenhausen	1951 AAA Championship Car season
West German Formula Two Championship	(West Germany) Paul Pietsch	
Formula Three
British Formula Three Championship	(United Kingdom) Eric Brandon	1951 British Formula Three Championship
East German Formula Three Championship	(East Germany) Werner Lehmann	1951 East German Formula Three Championship
West German Formula Three Championship	(West Germany) Walter Komossa	1951 West German Formula Three Championship

== Sports car and GT ==
Series	Driver	Season article
SCCA National Sports Car Championship	(United States) John Fitch	1951 SCCA National Sports Car Championship season

== Stock car racing ==
Series	Driver	Season article
NASCAR Grand National Series	(United States) Herb Thomas	1951 NASCAR Grand National Series
AAA Stock Car National Championship	(United States) Rodger Ward	1951 AAA Stock Car National Championship
Turismo Carretera	(Argentina) Juan Gálvez	

== See also ==
- List of motorsport championships
- Auto racing
