= List of 1950 motorsport champions =

1950 motorsport champions
Previous: 1949	Next: 1951

This list of 1950 motorsport champions is a list of national or international auto racing series with a Championship decided by the points or positions earned by a driver from multiple races.

== Motorcycle racing ==
Series	Rider	Season article
500cc World Championship	(Italy) Umberto Masetti	1950 Grand Prix motorcycle racing season
500cc World Championship	Constructors: (United Kingdom) Norton	1950 Grand Prix motorcycle racing season
350cc World Championship	(United Kingdom) Bob Foster	1950 Grand Prix motorcycle racing season
250cc World Championship	(Italy) Dario Ambrosini	1950 Grand Prix motorcycle racing season
125cc World Championship	(Italy) Bruno Ruffo	1950 Grand Prix motorcycle racing season
125cc World Championship	Constructors: (Italy) Mondial	1950 Grand Prix motorcycle racing season
Sidecars World Championship	(United Kingdom) Eric Oliver (Italy) Lorenzo Dobelli	1950 Grand Prix motorcycle racing season
Speedway World Championship	(United Kingdom) Freddie Williams	1950 Individual Speedway World Championship
AMA Grand National Championship	(United States) Larry Headrick	

== Open wheel racing ==
Series	Driver	Season article
World Championship of Drivers	(Italy) Giuseppe Farina	1950 Formula One season
AAA National Championship	(United States) Henry Banks	1950 AAA Championship Car season
Formula Three
East German Formula Three Championship	(Germany) Richard Weiser	1950 East German Formula Three Championship
Danish Formula Three Championship	(Denmark) Robert Nelleman	1950 Danish Formula Three Championship
German Formula Three Championship	(Germany) Toni Kreuzer	1950 German Formula Three Championship

== Stock car racing ==
Series	Driver	Season article
NASCAR Grand National Series	(United States) Bill Rexford	1950 NASCAR Grand National Series
AAA Stock Car National Championship	(United States) Jay Frank	1950 AAA Stock Car National Championship
Turismo Carretera	(Argentina) Juan Gálvez	

== See also ==
- List of motorsport championships
- Auto racing
