= American Stock Car Racing Association =

The American Stock Car Racing Association (ASCRA) was formed in Trenton, New Jersey in August/September 1947 by the owners and drivers of stock cars for the betterment of the sport. The officers for the first season were Leon McBride President, Paul Barbiche First Vice President, Charles DiNatale Second Vice President, Rocky DiNatale Treasurer, and William Streeter Secretary. The first event was Sunday October 5 at Flemington Fairgrounds, New Jersey. The winner of the darkness shortened feature was Tommy Bradshaw of Trenton, New Jersey.

The series was sanctioning a national championship when NASCAR was formed in the late 1940s. It operated between 1947 and 1950. Wally Campbell won the 1947, 1949, and 1950 championships.
