= Wally Campbell =

American race car driver

- Born: July 16, 1926; Trenton, New Jersey, U.S.
- Died: July 17, 1954 (aged 28); Salem, Indiana, U.S.
- Cause of death: Racing accident

NASCAR Cup Series career
- 11 races run over 4 years
- Best finish: 96th (1949)
- First race: 1949 Race 4 (Langhorne)
- Last race: 1953 Wilkes County 200 (North Wilkesboro)
Wins	Top tens	Poles
0	0	1

Wallace Campbell (July 16, 1926 – July 17, 1954) was an American stock car, midget, and sprint car racer from Trenton, New Jersey. He was the 1951 NASCAR Modified champion and the 1953 AAA Eastern Division Sprint Car Rookie of the Year. Campbell was killed practicing for an AAA Midwestern Division sprint car race at Salem, Indiana on July 17, 1954. He was one day past his 28th birthday.

== Career ==
Campbell began his stock car career at Flemington Fairgrounds in New Jersey in 1947, where he promptly rolled the car over. By the end of 1947, he was the champion of the newly formed American Stock Car Racing Association (ASCRA).

He finished sixth in points in 1948, then won the title in both 1949 and 1950. 1951 brought the NASCAR Modified title, and in 1952 he finished second in points to Buck Baker in the NASCAR Speedway Division. In 1953, he won five AAA sprint car races after getting a late start in August.

He attempted qualifying at Indianapolis in 1954, but was sent home to get "more experience". He made two AAA Championship Car race starts later that year at Langhorne Speedway and Darlington Speedway but failed to finish in both races. He was leading the AAA Eastern Division in points at the time of his death.

== Awards ==
Campbell was inducted into the National Sprint Car Hall of Fame in 2011.
