= Lehi, Arkansas =

Unincorporated community in Arkansas, US

Coordinates: 35°08′49″N 90°17′35″W

Lehi (also stylized as LeHi) is an unincorporated community in Crittenden County, Arkansas, United States, located at the intersection of I-40/US-79/US-63 and AR 147. It is the location of a former NASCAR track, the Memphis-Arkansas Speedway.
