= NASCAR Speedway Division =

High-speed prominent racing series in USA

- Category: Open wheel
- Country: United States
- Inaugural season: 1952
- Folded: 1953
- Last Drivers' champion: (United States) Pete Allen

The NASCAR Speedway Division was a short-lived series brought forth in 1952 by NASCAR president and founder Bill France Sr. The series consisted of open-wheel race cars competing with stock engines. The idea of the series was to draw from the popularity of other open-wheel racing events such as the Indianapolis 500.

== History ==
=== 1952 season ===
The first Speedway Division race was held at Darlington Raceway and was won by Buck Baker with a Cadillac engine. The series' second race was held at Martinsville Speedway on May 25, with only 17 entries. The pole at Martinsville was won by Bill Miller in an "Olds 88 Special". Tex Keene, driving a car with a stock Mercury engine came from 16th place to win the race. A total of seven races were run in 1952 with Buck Baker becoming the series champion.

=== 1953 season ===
In 1953, Speedway Division events were paired with those in the NASCAR Sportsman Division. Three races were held with few entries before the series was quietly discontinued. The final series champion was Pete Allen.

== Statistics ==
=== Race wins ===
Driver	NASCAR Speedway Division (1952–1953)
(United States) Wally Campbell	3
(United States) Tom Cherry	2
(United States) Pete Allen	1
(United States) Al Keller	1
(United States) Tex Keene	1
(United States) Buck Baker	1
(United States) Wayne Alspaugh	1

=== Championships ===
Driver	NASCAR Speedway Division (1952–1953)
(United States) Pete Allen	1
(United States) Buck Baker	1
