= Buck Baker =

American racing driver (1919–2002)

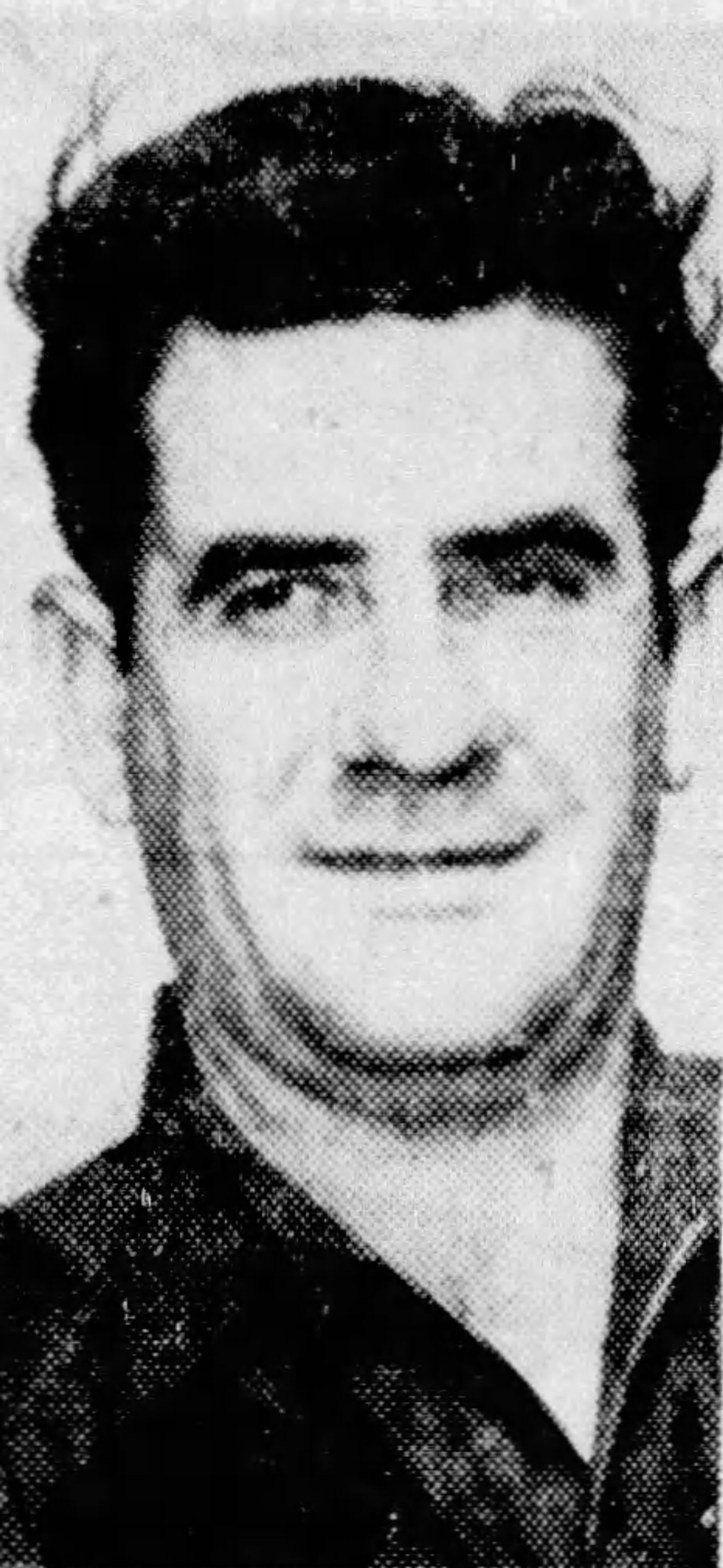
- Baker c. 1955
- Born: Elzie Wylie Baker Sr. March 4, 1919; Richburg, South Carolina, U.S.
- Died: April 14, 2002 (aged 83); Charlotte, North Carolina, U.S.
- Achievements: 1956 Grand National Series Champion; 1957 Grand National Series Champion; 1952 NASCAR Speedway Division Champion; 1953, 1960, 1964 Southern 500 Winner; Led Grand National Series in wins (1956, 1957); Led Grand National Series in poles (1956, 1957)
- Awards: Named one of NASCAR's 50 Greatest Drivers (1998); Motorsports Hall of Fame of America (1998); NASCAR Hall of Fame (2013); Named one of NASCAR's 75 Greatest Drivers (2023)

NASCAR Cup Series career
- 635 races run over 26 years
- Best finish: 1st (1956, 1957)
- First race: 1949 Race No. 1 (Charlotte)
- Last race: 1976 National 500 (Charlotte)
- First win: 1952 (Columbia)
- Last win: 1964 Southern 500 (Darlington)
| Wins | Top tens | Poles |
|---|---|---|
| 46 | 372 | 45 |

NASCAR Grand National East Series career
- 12 races run over 2 years
- Best finish: 11th (1972)
- First race: 1972 Bold City 200 (Jacksonville)
- Last race: 1973 Sunoco 260 (Hickory)
| Wins | Top tens | Poles |
|---|---|---|
| 0 | 5 | 0 |

NASCAR Convertible Division career
- 20 races run over 3 years
- Best finish: 23rd (1958)
- First race: 1957 Rebel 300 (Darlington)
- Last race: 1959 Race #14 (Greenville-Pickens)
| Wins | Top tens | Poles |
|---|---|---|
| 0 | 10 | 0 |
- Statistics up to date as of May 9, 2018.

Elzie Wylie "Buck" Baker Sr. (March 4, 1919 – April 14, 2002) was an American stock car racer. Born in Richburg, South Carolina, Baker began his NASCAR career in 1949 and won his first race three years later at Columbia Speedway. Twenty-seven years later, Baker retired after the 1976 National 500.

During his NASCAR Cup Series career, Baker won two championships, 46 races and 45 pole positions, as well as recorded 372 top-tens. In 1957, he became the first driver to win two consecutive championships in the series. Between 1957 and 1959, Baker competed in the NASCAR Convertible Division. From 1972 to 1973, he competed in the Grand National East Series, where he recorded five top-tens in twelve races. On May 23, 2012, it was announced that he would be inducted into the 2013 class of the NASCAR Hall of Fame on February 8, 2013.

== Racing career ==
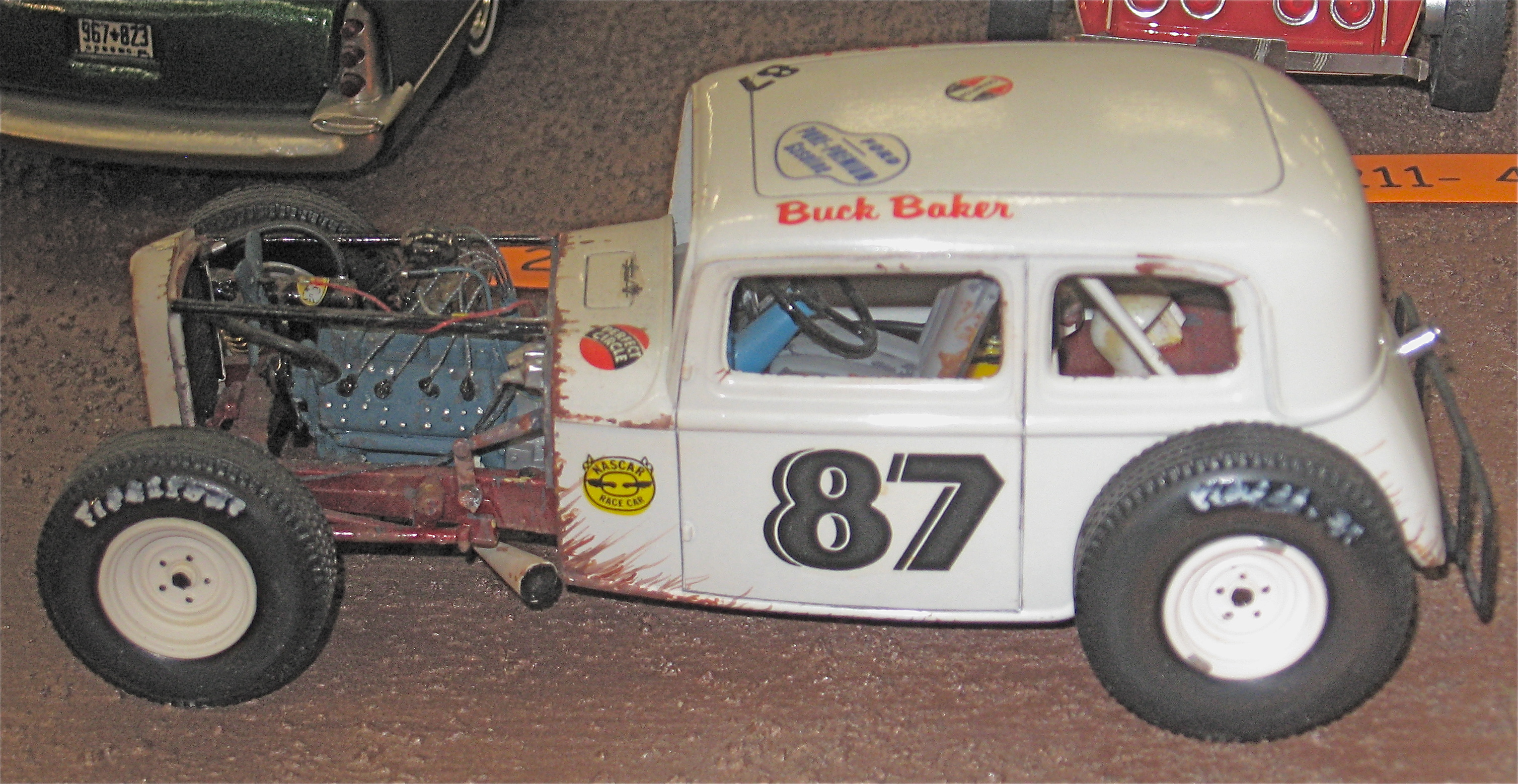
Model kit of Baker's flathead-powered Modified

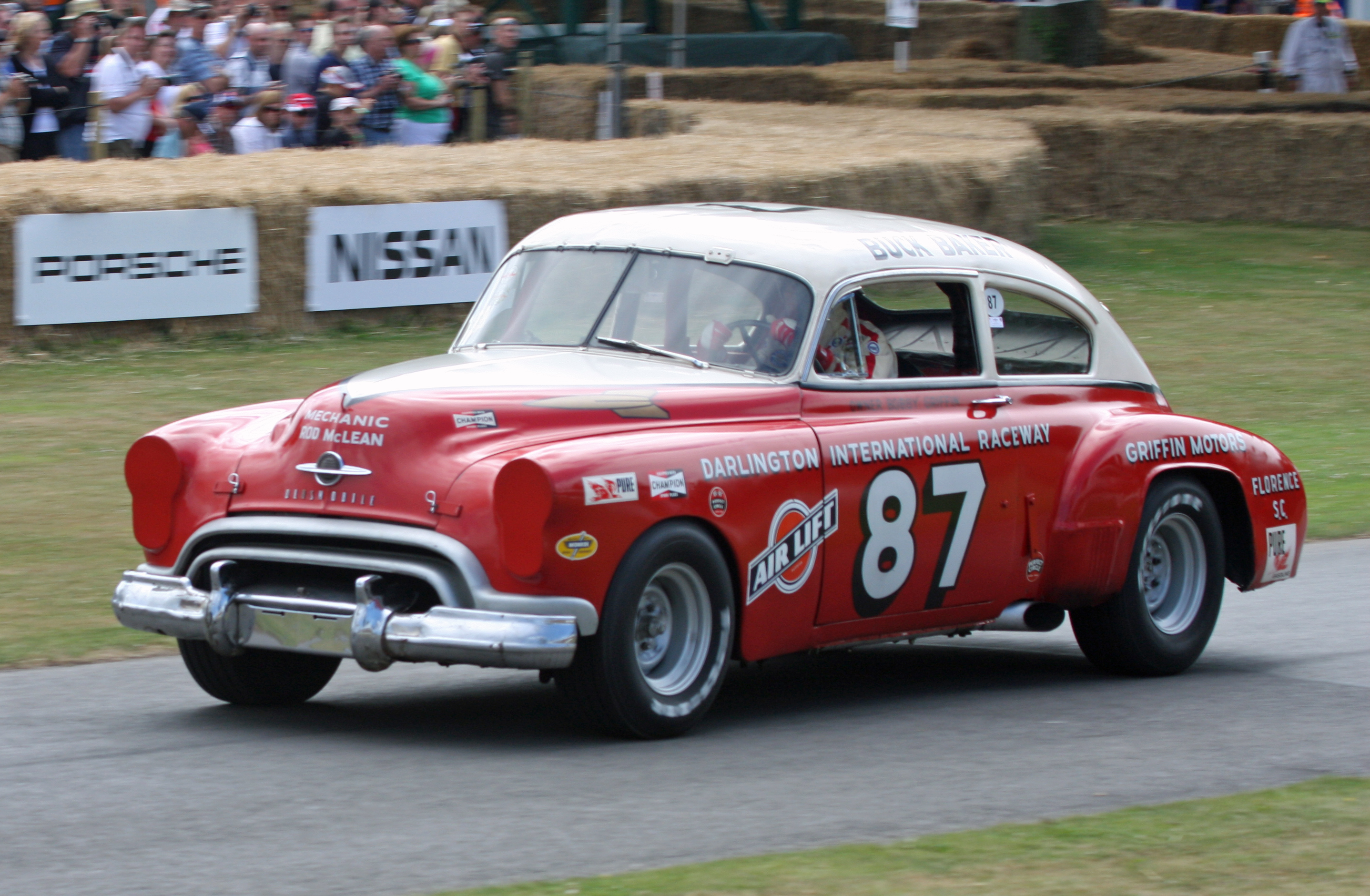
Replica of Baker's 1949 NASCAR Oldsmobile

Baker entered his first race in 1939 in Greenville, South Carolina, He entered his first NASCAR race in 1949 at Charlotte Speedway. Baker went on to become one of the greatest drivers in NASCAR's history; he was the first back-to-back winner of the Grand National Championship in 1956 and 1957. He was second twice (1955 and 1958) and finished in the top five on four other occasions.

Baker's 682 NASCAR starts (44 from the pole) ranks him third all-time and his 46 victories rank him 13th. In 1953, 1960 and 1964, Baker won the Southern 500 at Darlington Raceway. In 1963, Baker was given credit for winning a race that he clearly did not win. Wendell Scott won the race. NASCAR later reversed its ruling for the race. Scott did not receive the trophy. In 1967, Baker switched to NASCAR's Grand American division, where he was also very successful.

Baker, along with Roby Combs and Ike Kiser leased motorsport tracks and promoted races early in the 1950s. The three leased Charlotte Speedway in 1950 and promoted races there, before selling their lease to Bruton Smith. In September 1951, they leased Air Base Speedway, near Greenville, South Carolina, also to promote races.

After his retirement in 1976, Baker opened up the Buck Baker Racing School, where Jeff Gordon drove his first stock car. His son, Buddy, was a 34-year Winston Cup veteran and taught at the school along with Buck's daughter, Susie Baker; his other son, Randy, also competed in Winston Cup and operates SpeedTech Auto Racing Schools. He came out of retirement in 1993 to compete in one race of the short lived Fast Masters.

== Awards ==
Baker was inducted into the National Motorsports Press Association's Hall of Fame in 1982, the International Motorsports Hall of Fame in 1990, and the Motorsports Hall of Fame of America in 1998. Also in 1998, he was named one of the NASCAR's 50 Greatest Drivers. On May 23, 2012, it was announced that he would be one of five nominees to be inducted into the 2013 class of the NASCAR Hall of Fame on February 8, 2013.

== Last years and death ==
Baker died on the night of April 14, 2002 at Carolinas Medical Center in Charlotte, North Carolina of natural causes.

Baker's wife, Susan, is the former president of the Buck Baker Racing School. His son, Buddy Baker also grew to be a renowned NASCAR driver, winning the 1980 Daytona 500 in what is still the record speed for the 500 at 177.602 mph (285.809 km/h). Buddy would eventually become a TV broadcaster following his retirement from racing.

== Motorsports career results ==
=== NASCAR ===
(key) (Bold – Pole position awarded by qualifying time. Italics – Pole position earned by points standings or practice time. * – Most laps led.)

==== Grand National Series ====
NASCAR Grand National Series results
| Year | Team | No. | Make | 1 | 2 | 3 | 4 | 5 | 6 | 7 | 8 | 9 | 10 | 11 | 12 | 13 | 14 | 15 | 16 | 17 | 18 | 19 | 20 | 21 | 22 | 23 | 24 | 25 | 26 | 27 | 28 | 29 | 30 | 31 | 32 | 33 | 34 | 35 | 36 | 37 | 38 | 39 | 40 | 41 | 42 | 43 | 44 | 45 | 46 | 47 | 48 | 49 | 50 | 51 | 52 | 53 | 54 | 55 | 56 | 57 | 58 | 59 | 60 | 61 | 62 | NGNC | Pts | Ref |
|---|---|---|---|---|---|---|---|---|---|---|---|---|---|---|---|---|---|---|---|---|---|---|---|---|---|---|---|---|---|---|---|---|---|---|---|---|---|---|---|---|---|---|---|---|---|---|---|---|---|---|---|---|---|---|---|---|---|---|---|---|---|---|---|---|---|---|---|---|
| 1949 | Penny Mullis | 87 | Kaiser | CLT; 11 | | | | | | | | | | | | | | | | | | | | | | | | | | | | | | | | | | | | | | | | | | | | | | | | | | | | | | | | | | | | | | 46th | 20 | |
| 1949 | Buzzy Boehmen | 87 | Kaiser | | DAB; 23 | HBO | LAN | HAM | MAR | HEI | NWS | | | | | | | | | | | | | | | | | | | | | | | | | | | | | | | | | | | | | | | | | | | | | | | | | | | | | | | 46th | 20 | |
| 1950 | Buck Baker Racing | 70 | Ford | DAB; 9 | | | | | | | | | | | | | | | | | | | | | | | | | | | | | | | | | | | | | | | | | | | | | | | | | | | | | | | | | | | | | | 12th | 531.5 | |
| 1950 | Buck Baker Racing | 87 | Ford | | CLT; 22 | LAN | **MAR**; 8 | CAN | VER | DSP | MCF | | | | | | | | | | | | | | | | | | | | | | | | | | | | | | | | | | | | | | | | | | | | | | | | | | | | | | | 12th | 531.5 | |
| 1950 | | 87 | Chevy | | | | | | | | | CLT; 14 | HBO | DSP | HAM | | | | | | | | | | | | | | | | | | | | | | | | | | | | | | | | | | | | | | | | | | | | | | | | | | | 12th | 531.5 | |
| 1950 | Griffin Motors | 87 | Olds | | | | | | | | | | | | | DAR; 69 | LAN; 7 | NWS; 14 | VER | MAR; 3 | WIN | HBO; 2 | | | | | | | | | | | | | | | | | | | | | | | | | | | | | | | | | | | | | | | | | | | | 12th | 531.5 | |
| 1951 | Griffin Motors | 87 | Olds | DAB; 5 | CLT | NMO | GAR | HBO | ASF | NWS | MAR | CAN | | | | | | | | | | | | | | | | CLB; 5 | CCS | LAN | CLT; 13 | DSP | | | | | | | | | | | | | | | | | | | | | | | | | | | | | | | | | | 23rd | 644.5 | |
| 1951 | Buck Baker Racing | 87 | Plymouth | | | | | | | | | | CLS; 28 | CLB; 5 | DSP | GAR | GRS | BAI | HEI | AWS | MCF | ALS | MSF | FMS | MOR | ABS; 3 | | | | | | | WIL; 6 | HBO; 19 | TPN | PGS | MAR | OAK | NWS | HMS | JSP; 14 | | | | | | | | | | | | | | | | | | | | | | | | | 23rd | 644.5 | |
| 1951 | Buck Baker Racing | 87 | Ford | | | | | | | | | | | | | | | | | | | | | | | | DAR; 56 | | | | | | | | | | | | | | | ATL; 28 | GAR | NMO | | | | | | | | | | | | | | | | | | | | | | 23rd | 644.5 | |
| 1952 | Griffin Motors | 87 | Olds | PBS | DAB; 28 | JSP | | | | | | | | | | | | | | | | | | | | | | | | | | | | | | | | | | | | | | | | | | | | | | | | | | | | | | | | | | | | 12th | 2159 | |
| 1952 | B.A. Pless | 89 | Hudson | | | | NWS; 15 | **MAR**; 20 | **CLB**; 1* | ATL; 4 | CCS; 4 | LAN; 6 | DAR; 15* | DSP | CAN | HAY | FMS | HBO | CLT | MSF | NIF | OSW | MON | MOR | PPS | MCF | AWS; 10 | | CCS; 27 | | | | | | NWS; 16 | ATL | PBS | | | | | | | | | | | | | | | | | | | | | | | | | | | | | 12th | 2159 | |
| 1952 | Wheatley Motors | 87 | Lincoln | | | | | | | | | | | | | | | | | | | | | | | | | DAR; 9 | | | | | | | | | | | | | | | | | | | | | | | | | | | | | | | | | | | | | | 12th | 2159 | |
| 1952 | Buck Baker Racing | 87 | Ford | | | | | | | | | | | | | | | | | | | | | | | | | | | LAN; 44 | DSP | WIL; 21 | HBO | MAR | | | | | | | | | | | | | | | | | | | | | | | | | | | | | | | | 12th | 2159 | |
| 1953 | Wheatley Motors | 87 | Lincoln | PBS | DAB; 13 | HAR | NWS; 6 | | | | | | | | | | | | | | | | | | | | | | | | | | | | | | | | | | | | | | | | | | | | | | | | | | | | | | | | | | | 4th | 6713 | |
| 1953 | Griffin Motors | 87 | Olds | | | | | CLT; 14 | **RCH**; 3 | CCS; 8 | LAN; 1 | CLB; 1 | HCY; 19 | MAR; 7 | PMS; 3 | RSP; 13 | LOU; 5 | FIF; 4 | LAN; 36 | TCS; 4 | **WIL**; 5 | MCF | **PIF**; 2 | MOR | ATL; 7* | RVS; 5 | LCF; 4 | **DAV**; 2 | HBO; 18 | AWS; 4 | PAS; 6 | | DAR; 1* | CCS; 7 | LAN; 11 | BLF; 3 | WIL; 7 | **NWS**; 6* | MAR; 20* | ATL; 1 | | | | | | | | | | | | | | | | | | | | | | | | | | 4th | 6713 | |
| 1953 | | | Ford | | | | | | | | | | | | | | | | | | | | | | | | | | | | | HCY; 10 | | | | | | | | | | | | | | | | | | | | | | | | | | | | | | | | | | 4th | 6713 | |
| 1954 | Griffin Motors | 87 | Olds | PBS; 2* | DAB; 2 | JSP; 5 | ATL; 2 | OSP; 2 | OAK | NWS; 15 | | | LAN; 6 | | | SHA; 2 | | CLT; 1* | GAR | | | | MCF; 4 | WGS; 6 | | | | | | | | | COR; 3 | **DAR**; 44 | CCS; 21 | CLT; 3 | LAN; 4 | MAS; 1 | MAR; 3 | NWS; 2 | | | | | | | | | | | | | | | | | | | | | | | | | | 3rd | 6893 | |
| 1954 | Ernest Woods | 88 | Olds | | | | | | | | **HBO**; 3 | CCS; 8 | | WIL; 1* | MAR; 18 | | RSP; 9 | | | **CLB**; 8 | **LND**; 3 | HCY; 3 | | | PIF; 4 | AWS; 14 | **SFS**; 5 | GRS; 2 | **MOR**; 1 | OAK | **CLT**; 5 | | | | | | | | | | | | | | | | | | | | | | | | | | | | | | | | | | | 3rd | 6893 | |
| 1954 | Slick Smith | 87 | Cadillac | | | | | | | | | | | | | | | | | | | | | | | | | | | | | SAN; 17 | | | | | | | | | | | | | | | | | | | | | | | | | | | | | | | | | | 3rd | 6893 | |
| 1955 | Frank Christian | 14 | Olds | TCS; 2 | | | | | | | | | | | | | | | | | | | | | | | | | | | | | | | | | | | | | | | | | | | | | | | | | | | | | | | | | | | | | | 2nd | 8088 | |
| 1955 | Griffin Motors | 87 | Olds | | PBS; 3 | JSP; 4 | DAB; 9 | OSP; 16 | CLB; 4 | HBO; 2 | NWS; 1* | MGY; 12 | LAN; 2 | | HCY; 11 | ASF | TUS | MAR; 6 | | NCF; 3 | FOR; 12* | LIN; 3 | | FON; 4 | AIR; 2 | CLT; 2 | | | | | | | | | | | | | | | | | | | | | | | | | | | | | | | | | | | | | | | | 2nd | 8088 | |
| 1955 | Buck Baker Racing | 89 | Buick | | | | | | | | | | | CLT; 1 | | | | | RCH; 17 | | | | | | | | | | AWS; 9 | | | | SAN; 5 | | FOR; 3 | MAS; 5 | RSP; 6 | DAR; 6 | MGY; 5 | | | | | | | | | | | | | | | | | | | | | | | | | | | 2nd | 8088 | |
| 1955 | Griffin Motors | 303 | Olds | | | | | | | | | | | | | | | | | | | | **MCF**; 16 | | | | | | | | | | | | | | | | | | | | | | | | | | | | | | | | | | | | | | | | | | | 2nd | 8088 | |
| 1955 | Henry Ford | 303 | Chrysler | | | | | | | | | | | | | | | | | | | | | | | | PIF; 4 | CLB; 5 | | MOR; 23 | ALS; 25 | | | CLT; 3 | | | | | | | | | | | | | | | | | | | | | | | | | | | | | | | | 2nd | 8088 | |
| 1955 | B & L Motors | 55 | Olds | | | | | | | | | | | | | | | | | | | | | | | | | | | | | NYF; 9 | | | | | | | | | | | | | | | | | | | | | | | | | | | | | | | | | | 2nd | 8088 | |
| 1955 | Carl Kiekhaefer | 89 | Buick | | | | | | | | | | | | | | | | | | | | | | | | | | | | | | | | | | | | | LAN; 6 | | | | | | | | | | | | | | | | | | | | | | | | | | 2nd | 8088 | |
| 1955 | DePaolo Engineering | 87 | Ford | | | | | | | | | | | | | | | | | | | | | | | | | | | | | | | | | | | | | | RSP; 7 | GPS; 5 | MAS; 6 | CLB; 2* | MAR; 10 | LVP | **NWS**; 1* | HBO; 3 | | | | | | | | | | | | | | | | | | 2nd | 8088 | |
| 1956 | Satcher Motors | 87 | Ford | HCY; 7 | CLT; 5 | WSS | PBS; 4 | | | | | | | | | | | | | | | | | | | | | | | | | | | | | | | | | | | | | | | | | | | | | | | | | | | | | | | | | | | 1st | 9272 | |
| 1956 | Carl Kiekhaefer | 301 | Chrysler | | | | | ASF; 1 | DAB; 20 | | | | | | | | | | | | | | | | | | | | | | | | | | | | | | | | | | | | | | | | | | | | | | | | | | | | | | | | | 1st | 9272 | |
| 1956 | Carl Kiekhaefer | 500B | Dodge | | | | | | | **PBS**; 2 | WIL; 2 | | | | | **CLB**; 2 | | GPS; 1 | HCY; 3 | | | LIN; 1 | | | | | | | | | | | | | | | CCF; 5 | | | | | | | | | | | | | | | CLB; 1 | | | | | | | | | | | | | | 1st | 9272 | |
| 1956 | Carl Kiekhaefer | 300C | Chrysler | | | | | | | | | ATL; 1 | NWS; 11 | | | | | | | | | | | | | | | | | | | | RSP; 11 | | | | | | | | | | | | | | | | | | | | | | | | | | | | | | | | | 1st | 9272 | |
| 1956 | Carl Kiekhaefer | 87 | Chrysler | | | | | | | | | | | **LAN**; 1* | | | | | | | | | | | | | | | | | | | | | | | | | | | | | | | | | DAR; 26 | CSH; 1* | | **LAN**; 38 | POR | | | | | | | | | | | | | | | 1st | 9272 | |
| 1956 | Carl Kiekhaefer | 87 | Dodge | | | | | | | | | | | | **RCH**; 1* | | | | | | | | | | | | | | | | | | | | | | | | | | | | | | | | | | CLT; 23 | | | | | | | | | | | | | | | | | 1st | 9272 | |
| 1956 | Carl Kiekhaefer | 300 | Chrysler | | | | | | | | | | | | | | CON; 2 | | | **HBO**; 1 | | | CLT; 3 | POR | EUR | **NYF**; 1* | MER | **MAS**; 9* | CLT; 5 | MCF; 4 | POR | AWS; 21 | | PIF; 13 | CSF | | | MGY; 2 | OKL; 9 | | | | | PIF; 7 | MYB; 4 | POR | | | | | | | | | | | | | | | | | | | | 1st | 9272 | |
| 1956 | Carl Kiekhaefer | 502 | Dodge | | | | | | | | | | | | | | | | | | **MAR**; 1 | | | | | | | | | | | | | | | CHI; 6 | | | | **ROA**; 8 | | | | | | | | | | | | | | | | | | | | | | | | | | 1st | 9272 | |
| 1956 | John Whitford | 31 | Ford | | | | | | | | | | | | | | | | | | | | | | | | | | | | | | | | | | | | | | OBS; 9 | | | | | | | | | | | | | | | | | | | | | | | | | 1st | 9272 | |
| 1956 | Carl Kiekhaefer | 300B | Chrysler | | | | | | | | | | | | | | | | | | | | | | | | | | | | | | | | | | | | | | | SAN; 35 | | | | | | | | | | | HBO; 2* | NWP; 2* | CLT; 1* | CCF; 1 | | HCY; 3 | **WIL**; 1 | | | | | | | 1st | 9272 | |
| 1956 | Carl Kiekhaefer | 501 | Dodge | | | | | | | | | | | | | | | | | | | | | | | | | | | | | | | | | | | | | | | | NOR; 4 | | | | | | | | | | | | | | | | | | | | | | | 1st | 9272 | |
| 1956 | Carl Kiekhaefer | 00 | Chrysler | | | | | | | | | | | | | | | | | | | | | | | | | | | | | | | | | | | | | | | | | | | | | | | | | | | | | | **MAR**; 7 | | | | | | | | | 1st | 9272 | |
| 1957 | Hugh Babb | 87 | Chevy | WSS | CON | TIC | DAB; 4 | CON; 2 | WIL; 2 | HBO; 1* | AWS; 1* | NWS; 5 | LAN; 5 | CLT; 3* | PIF; 10 | **GBF**; 3 | POR | CCF; 6 | RCH; 10 | MAR; 1 | POR | EUR | LIN; 1 | **LCS**; 2 | ASP | | | | | | | | | | | | | | | | | | | | | | | | | | | | | | | | | | | | | | | | | 1st | 10716 | |
| 1957 | Buck Baker Racing | 87 | Chevy | | | | | | | | | | | | | | | | | | | | | | | NWP; 3 | **CLB**; 2 | CPS | PIF; 3* | JAC; 1 | RSP; 7 | CLT; 2 | MAS; 4 | POR | HCY; 7 | NOR; 1 | LCS; 4 | **GLN**; 1* | KPC | LIN; 26 | OBS; 7 | MYB; 4 | DAR; 5 | NYF | AWS; 2 | CSF | SCF | LAN; 5 | **CLB**; 1 | **CCF**; 1* | CLT; 4 | MAR; 23 | NBR; 2 | CON; 9 | NWS; 6 | GBF; 1 | | | | | | | | | | 1st | 10716 | |
| 1958 | Buck Baker Racing | 87 | Chevy | FAY; 8 | DAB; 7 | CON; 29 | FAY; 3 | WIL; 2 | **HBO**; 1* | FAY; 7 | CLB; 24 | PIF; 22 | ATL; 6 | CLT; 6 | **MAR**; 35 | ODS | OBS | GPS; 2 | GBF; 6 | STR; 10 | NWS; 4 | BGS; 24 | TRN; 6 | RSD | **CLB**; 18 | NBS; 15 | REF; 3 | LIN; 2 | HCY; 6 | AWS; 2 | RSP; 2 | MCC; 7 | SLS | TOR | BUF | MCF; 2 | BEL; 3 | BRR; 5 | CLB; 14 | NSV; 6 | AWS; 5 | BGS; 5 | MBS; 2 | DAR; 2 | CLT; 1* | BIR; 2 | CSF | GAF; 1 | RCH; 4 | HBO; 3 | SAS; 2 | MAR; 5 | NWS; 10 | ATL; 13 | | | | | | | | | | | | 2nd | 11588 | |
| 1959 | Buck Baker Racing | 86 | Chevy | FAY; 3 | | | | | | | | | | | | | | | | | | | | | | | | | | | | | | | | | | | | | | | | | | | | | | | | | | | | | | | | | | | | | | 5th | 7170 | |
| 1959 | Buck Baker Racing | 87 | Chevy | | DAY; 28 | DAY; 42 | | | **ATL**; 2 | | | | | | HCY; 15 | MAR; 39 | TRN | CLT; 5 | NSV; 4 | ASP | | | ATL; 3 | CLB; 3* | WIL; 5 | **RCH**; 3 | | | DAY; 35 | HEI | | | | | | | | | | | | | | | | | | | | | | | | | | | | | | | | | | | | 5th | 7170 | |
| 1959 | Buck Baker Racing | 88 | Chevy | | | | HBO; 5 | **CON**; 18 | | WIL; 15 | | CLB; 19 | NWS; 21 | REF | | | | | | | PIF; 11 | GPS; 6 | | | | | | | | | | | | | | | | | | HCY; 2 | RCH | CSF | | | | | | | | | | | | | | | | | | | | | | | | 5th | 7170 | |
| 1959 | Buck Baker Racing | 89 | Chevy | | | | | | | | BGS; 5 | | | | | | | | | | | | | | | | BGS; 9 | AWS | | | | | | | | | | | | | | | | | | | | | | | | | | | | | | | | | | | | | | 5th | 7170 | |
| 1959 | Lynton Tyson | 87 | Chevy | | | | | | | | | | | | | | | | | | | | | | | | | | | | **CLT**; 3 | | CLT; 13 | NSV; 11 | | | | | DAR; 9 | | | | | MAR; 14 | | NWS; 8 | CON; 3 | | | | | | | | | | | | | | | | | | | 5th | 7170 | |
| 1959 | Lynton Tyson | 88 | Chevy | | | | | | | | | | | | | | | | | | | | | | | | | | | | | MBS; 20 | | | AWS; 8 | BGS | GPS; 1 | CLB | | | | | HBO; 12 | | AWS; 12 | | | | | | | | | | | | | | | | | | | | | 5th | 7170 | |
| 1960 | Lynton Tyson | 87 | Chevy | **CLT**; 3 | CLB | | | | | | | | | | | | | | | | | | | | | | | | | | | | | | | | | | | | | | | | | | | | | | | | | | | | | | | | | | | | | 4th | 14674 | |
| 1960 | Buck Baker Racing | 87 | Chevy | | | DAY; 15 | DAY | DAY; 18 | CLT; 13 | NWS; 14 | PHO | CLB; 2 | MAR; 26 | HCY; 12 | WIL; 5 | BGS | GPS; 17 | AWS; 8 | DAR; 5 | PIF; 9 | HBO; 5 | RCH; 8 | HMS | CLT; 5 | | DAY; 28 | HEI | MAB; 5 | MBS; 1 | ATL; 31 | BIR; 7 | NSV; 3 | AWS; 27 | PIF; 9 | CLB; 3 | SBO; 4 | BGS; 5 | | **HCY**; 15 | CSF | GSP; 10 | HBO; 8 | MAR; 5 | NWS; 5 | CLT; 18 | RCH; 6 | ATL; 20 | | | | | | | | | | | | | | | | | | | 4th | 14674 | |
| 1960 | L.D. Austin | 74 | Chevy | | | | | | | | | | | | | | | | | | | | | | BGS; 8 | | | | | | | | | | | | | | | | | | | | | | | | | | | | | | | | | | | | | | | | | 4th | 14674 | |
| 1960 | Jack Smith | 47 | Pontiac | | | | | | | | | | | | | | | | | | | | | | | | | | | | | | | | | | | DAR; 1* | | | | | | | | | | | | | | | | | | | | | | | | | | | | 4th | 14674 | |
| 1961 | Buck Baker Racing | 87 | Chevy | CLT; 4 | JSP; 11 | | | | | | | | | | | | | | | | | | | | | | | | | | | | | | | | | | | | | | | | | | | | | | | | | | | | | | | | | | | | | 10th | 13746 | |
| 1961 | Buck Baker Racing | 87 | Chrysler | | | DAY; 4 | DAY | DAY; 9 | PIF | AWS | HMS | | | | | | | | | | | DAR; 20 | CLT | CLT; 12 | RSD | ASP | CLT; 42 | | | | | | | | DAY; 30 | ATL; 6 | | | | | | | | | DAR; 27 | | | | ATL; 25 | | | CLT; 17 | | | | | | | | | | | | | | 10th | 13746 | |
| 1961 | Buck Baker Racing | 86 | Chrysler | | | | | | | | | ATL; 15 | GPS; 5 | HBO; 3 | BGS; 16 | MAR; 12 | NWS; 25 | CLB; 16 | HCY; 2 | RCH; 3 | MAR; 5 | | | | | | | PIF; 11 | BIR; 11 | GPS; 21 | BGS; 7 | NOR; 4 | HAS; 1 | STR; 9 | | | CLB; 15 | MBS; 13* | BRI; 37 | NSV; 4 | BGS | AWS; 28 | RCH; 15 | SBO | | HCY; 3 | RCH; 15 | CSF | | MAR; 21 | NWS; 27 | | BRI; 11 | **GPS**; 17* | HBO; 17 | | | | | | | | | | | 10th | 13746 | |
| 1962 | Buck Baker Racing | 86 | Chrysler | CON; 15 | AWS; 2 | DAY | | | | | | HBO; 9 | | | | GPS; 16 | MBS; 16 | | | | | | | | | | | | | | | | | | | | | | | | | | | | | | | | | | | | | | | | | | | | | | | | | 13th | 12838 | |
| 1962 | Buck Baker Racing | 87 | Chrysler | | | | DAY; 17 | DAY; 28 | CON | AWS | SVH | | RCH; 24 | CLB; 8 | NWS; 6 | | | MAR; 23 | BGS | BRI; 27 | RCH | HCY | CON | DAR; 14 | PIF | CLT; 31 | ATL; 20 | BGS; 18 | AUG; 14 | RCH; 10 | SBO; 9 | DAY; 12 | CLB | ASH; 4 | GPS; 18 | AUG; 3 | SVH; 19 | MBS | BRI; 13 | CHT; 9 | NSV; 3 | HUN; 4 | AWS; 23 | STR | BGS | PIF | VAL | DAR; 11 | HCY; 3 | RCH; 30 | DTS; 10 | AUG; 11 | MAR | NWS; 27 | CLT; 18 | | | | | | | | | | | 13th | 12838 | |
| 1962 | Jack Smith | 47 | Pontiac | | | | | | | | | | | | | | | | | | | | | | | | | | | | | | | | | | | | | | | | | | | | | | | | | | | | | ATL; 8 | | | | | | | | | | 13th | 12838 | |
| 1963 | Buck Baker Racing | 87 | Chrysler | BIR; 3 | GGS; 12 | THS | RSD | DAY | | | | AWS; 2 | HBO; 12 | | HCY; 7 | | AUG; 5 | | | SBO; 9 | BGS; 4 | | | | THS; 14 | | | | | | | | | | | | | | | | | | | | | | | | | | | | | | | | | | | | | | | | | 11th | 18114 | |
| 1963 | Buck Baker Racing | 87 | Pontiac | | | | | | DAY; 31 | DAY; DNQ | PIF | | | ATL; 33 | | BRI; 23 | | RCH; 16 | GPS; 1 | | | MAR; 24 | NWS; 5 | CLB; 2 | | DAR; 8 | ODS | RCH | CLT; 43 | BIR; 3 | ATL; 9 | DAY; 15 | MBS; 2 | SVH; 9 | DTS; 3 | BGS; 3 | ASH; 5 | OBS; 14 | BRR; 10 | BRI; 32 | GPS; 3 | NSV; 5 | CLB; 15 | AWS; 7 | PIF; 3 | BGS; 10 | ONA; 5 | | HCY; 6 | RCH; 22 | MAR; 10 | DTS; 7 | NWS; 19 | THS; 6 | | SBO; 20 | HBO; 4 | RSD | | | | | | | | 11th | 18114 | |
| 1963 | Smokey Yunick | 13 | Chevy | | | | | | | | | | | | | | | | | | | | | | | | | | | | | | | | | | | | | | | | | | | | | DAR; 10 | | | | | | | | | | | | | | | | | | 11th | 18114 | |
| 1963 | Fox Racing | 33 | Chevy | | | | | | | | | | | | | | | | | | | | | | | | | | | | | | | | | | | | | | | | | | | | | | | | | | | | CLT; 27 | | | | | | | | | | | 11th | 18114 | |
| 1964 | Buck Baker Racing | 87 | Pontiac | CON; 12 | | JSP; 2 | SVH; 16 | RSD | | | | | | | | | | | | | | | | | | | | | | | | | | | | | | | | | | | | | | | | | | | | | | | | | | | | | | | | | | 9th | 22366 | |
| 1964 | Petty Enterprises | 42 | Plymouth | | AUG; 29 | | | | | | | | | | | | | | | | | | | | | | | | | | | | | | | | | | | | | | | | | | | | | | | | | | | | | | | | | | | | | 9th | 22366 | |
| 1964 | Petty Enterprises | 41 | Plymouth | | | | | | DAY; 2* | DAY | DAY; 12 | RCH | BRI; 4 | GPS | BGS | ATL; 5 | AWS | HBO | PIF | CLB | NWS; 6 | MAR | SVH | | | | | | | | | | | | | | | | | | | | | | | | | | | | | | | | | | | | | | | | | | | 9th | 22366 | |
| 1964 | Fox Racing | 3 | Dodge | | | | | | | | | | | | | | | | | | | | | DAR; 26 | LGY | | | CLT; 20 | GPS; 17 | ASH; 7 | ATL; 20 | CON; 20 | NSV; 3 | CHT; 3 | BIR; 5 | VAL; 1 | PIF; 17 | DAY; 4 | ODS | OBS | BRR; 2 | ISP | GLN; 4 | LIN | BRI; 19 | NSV | MBS | AWS; 5 | DTS | ONA | CLB | BGS | STR | DAR; 1 | HCY; 3 | RCH; 24 | ODS | | MAR; 13 | SVH | NWS; 5 | CLT; 8 | HAR | | | 9th | 22366 | |
| 1964 | Fox Racing | 03 | Dodge | | | | | | | | | | | | | | | | | | | | | | | HCY; 11 | SBO | | | | | | | | | | | | | | | | | | | | | | | | | | | | | | | | | | | | | | | 9th | 22366 | |
| 1964 | David Walker | 89 | Plymouth | | | | | | | | | | | | | | | | | | | | | | | | | | | | | | | | | | | | | | | | | | | | | | | | | | | | | | | HBO; 20 | | | | | | AUG; 15 | JAC; 23 | 9th | 22366 | |
| 1965 | Buck Baker Racing | 88 | Dodge | RSD; 9 | DAY | | | | | RCH; 2 | HBO; 6 | | | | | | | | | | | | | | | | | | | | | | | | ISP; 15 | GLN | | | | | | | | | | | | | | | | | | | | | | | | | | | | | | 17th | 13136 | |
| 1965 | Buck Baker Racing | 87 | Olds | | | DAY; 26 | DAY; DNQ | PIF | ASW | | | ATL; 28 | GPS; 17 | NWS; 23 | MAR; 28 | CLB | BRI | | | | | | | | | | | | | | | | | | | | | | | | | | | | | | | | | | | | | | | | | | | | | | | | | 17th | 13136 | |
| 1965 | Buck Baker Racing | 87 | Chevy | | | | | | | | | | | | | | | DAR; 10 | LGY | BGS | HCY | CLT; 38 | CCF; 19 | ASH | HAR | NSV | BIR | ATL; 32 | GPS | MBS | VAL; 19 | DAY; 32 | ODS; 9 | OBS | | | BRI; 5 | NSV; 22 | CCF | AWS; 6 | SMR; 15 | PIF | AUG; 8 | CLB; 10 | DTS; 7 | BLV | BGS | | | LIN; 21 | ODS; 27 | RCH; 24 | MAR; 29 | NWS; 12 | CLT; 26 | HBO | CAR; 9 | DTS | | | | | | | | 17th | 13136 | |
| 1965 | Buck Baker Racing | 86 | Plymouth | | | | | | | | | | | | | | | | | | | | | | | | | | | | | | | | | | | | | | | | | | | | | DAR; 2 | HCY | | | | | | | | | | | | | | | | | 17th | 13136 | |
| 1966 | Buck Baker Racing | 87 | Chevy | AUG; 27 | RSD | DAY | DAY | | | | | | | | | | | | | | | | | | | | | | | | | | | | | | | | | | | | | | | | | | | | | | | | | | | | | | | | | | | 21st | 14504 | |
| 1966 | Buck Baker Racing | 87 | Olds | | | | | DAY; 22 | CAR | BRI | ATL | HCY; 26 | CLB; 23 | GPS; 14 | BGS; 9 | NWS; 27 | MAR; 11 | DAR; 8 | LGY; 16 | MGR; 10 | MON; 16 | RCH; 18 | | | ASH; 9 | PIF | SMR; 2 | AWS; 4 | BLV; 26 | GPS | | ODS; 5 | | | FON; 5 | | BRI; 32 | SMR; 11 | NSV; 2 | ATL; 9 | CLB | AWS | BLV; 4 | BGS | DAR; 41 | HCY; 18 | RCH; 2 | HBO | | NWS; 31 | CLT; 32 | CAR; 17 | | | | | | | | | | | | | | 21st | 14504 | |
| 1966 | Buck Baker Racing | 88 | Chevy | | | | | | | | | | | | | | | | | | | | CLT; 10 | DTS | | | | | | | | | BRR; 6 | OXF; 11 | | ISP; 25 | | | | | | | | | | | | | | | | | | | | | | | | | | | | | | 21st | 14504 | |
| 1966 | Buck Baker Racing | 86 | Chevy | | | | | | | | | | | | | | | | | | | | | | | | | | | | DAY; 33 | | | | | | | | | | | | | | | | | | | | | | | | | | | | | | | | | | | 21st | 14504 | |
| 1966 | Buck Baker Racing | 86 | Dodge | | | | | | | | | | | | | | | | | | | | | | | | | | | | | | | | | | | | | | | | | | | | | | MAR; 11 | | | | | | | | | | | | | | | | | 21st | 14504 | |
| 1967 | Buck Baker Racing | 88 | Olds | AUG | RSD | DAY | DAY | DAY | AWS; 21 | BRI; 21 | GPS | BGS; 14 | ATL | CLB | HCY | | | SVH; 13 | | | | | | | | | | | | MGY; 11 | | | OXF; 8 | FDA; 8 | ISP; 11 | | SMR; 18 | NSV; 16 | | | | | | | | | | | | | | | | | | | | | | | | | | | | 27th | 9450 | |
| 1967 | Buck Baker Racing | 87 | Ford | | | | | | | | | | | | | NWS; 12 | MAR; 8 | | RCH; 24 | DAR; 31 | BLV | LGY | CLT; 16 | ASH | MGR | SMR | BIR | CAR; 17 | GPS | | DAY; 19 | TRN; 7 | | | | BRI; 10 | | | ATL; 20 | BGS | CLB | SVH | DAR | HCY | RCH | BLV | HBO | MAR | NWS | CLT | CAR | AWS | | | | | | | | | | | | | | 27th | 9450 | |
| 1968 | Buck Baker Racing | 87 | Ford | MGR; 28 | MGY; 8 | RSD | DAY | BRI | | | | | | | | | | | | | | | | | | | | | | | | | | | | | | | | | | | | | | | | | | | | | | | | | | | | | | | | | | 39th | 650 | |
| 1968 | Neil Castles | 06 | Plymouth | | | | | | RCH; 20 | ATL | | | | | | | | | | | | | | | | | | | | | | | | | | | | | | | | | | | | | | | | | | | | | | | | | | | | | | | | 39th | 650 | |
| 1968 | Buck Baker Racing | 88 | Olds | | | | | | | | HCY; 16 | GPS; 7 | CLB; 12 | NWS; 19 | MAR; 39 | | AWS; 24 | DAR | BLV; 20 | LGY | CLT | ASH | MGR | SMR | BIR | | GPS; 15 | DAY | | | | | | | | | | | | | | | | | | | | | | | | | | | | | | | | | | | | | | 39th | 650 | |
| 1968 | Buck Baker Racing | 87 | Olds | | | | | | | | | | | | | AUG; 5 | | | | | | | | | | | | | | | | | | | | | | | | | | | | | | | | | | | | | | | | | | | | | | | | | | 39th | 650 | |
| 1968 | Buck Baker Racing | 87 | Chevy | | | | | | | | | | | | | | | | | | | | | | | CAR; 17 | | | ISP; 14 | OXF; 22 | FDA; 13 | TRN; 21 | BRI | SMR | NSV | ATL | CLB | BGS | AWS | SBO | LGY | DAR | HCY | RCH | BLV | HBO | MAR | NWS | AUG | CLT | CAR | JFC | | | | | | | | | | | | | | 39th | 650 | |
| 1969 | Bailey Racing | 87 | Pontiac | MGR | MGY | RSD | DAY | DAY | DAY | CAR | AUG | BRI | ATL | CLB | HCY | GPS | RCH | NWS | MAR | AWS | DAR | BLV | LGY | CLT | MGR | SMR | MCH | KPT | GPS | NCF | DAY | DOV | TPN | TRN | BLV | BRI | NSV | SMR | ATL | MCH | SBO | BGS | AWS | DAR | HCY | RCH | TAL; 18 | CLB | MAR | NWS | CLT | SVH | AUG | CAR | JFC | MGR | TWS | | | | | | | | | NA | 0 | |
| 1970 | Robert Brown | 58 | Chevy | RSD | DAY | DAY | DAY | RCH | CAR | SVH | ATL | BRI | TAL | NWS | CLB | DAR | BLV | LGY | CLT | SMR | MAR | MCH | RSD | HCY | KPT | GPS | DAY | AST | TPN | TRN | BRI | SMR | NSV | ATL | CLB | ONA | MCH | TAL | BGS | SBO | DAR | HCY | RCH | DOV; 17 | NCF | NWS | CLT; DNQ | MAR; DNQ | MGR | CAR | LGY | | | | | | | | | | | | | | | NA | 0 | |
| 1971 | Buck Baker Racing | 87 | Pontiac | RSD | DAY | DAY | DAY | ONT | RCH | CAR | HCY | BRI | ATL | CLB | GPS | SMR | NWS | MAR | DAR | SBO | TAL | ASH | KPT | CLT | DOV | MCH | RSD | HOU | GPS | DAY | BRI | AST | ISP | TRN | NSV | ATL | BGS; 4 | ONA; 16 | MCH | TAL | CLB; 17 | HCY; 13 | DAR | MAR | CLT | DOV | CAR | MGR; 18 | RCH | NWS; 6 | TWS | | | | | | | | | | | | | | | NA | 0 | |

==== Winston Cup Series ====
NASCAR Winston Cup Series results
| Year | Team | No. | Make | 1 | 2 | 3 | 4 | 5 | 6 | 7 | 8 | 9 | 10 | 11 | 12 | 13 | 14 | 15 | 16 | 17 | 18 | 19 | 20 | 21 | 22 | 23 | 24 | 25 | 26 | 27 | 28 | 29 | 30 | 31 | NWCC | Pts | Ref |
|---|---|---|---|---|---|---|---|---|---|---|---|---|---|---|---|---|---|---|---|---|---|---|---|---|---|---|---|---|---|---|---|---|---|---|---|---|---|
| 1972 | Furr Engineering | 93 | Chevy | RSD | DAY | RCH | ONT | CAR; 36 | ATL | BRI | DAR; 30 | NWS; 21 | MAR | TAL; 40 | CLT | DOV | MCH | RSD | TWS | DAY | BRI | TRN | ATL | TAL | MCH | NSV | | | | | | | | | NA | 0 | |
| 1972 | Poling Racing | 65 | Chevy | | | | | | | | | | | | | | | | | | | | | | | | DAR; 26 | RCH | DOV | MAR | NWS | CLT | CAR | TWS | NA | 0 | |
| 1973 | Poling Racing | 65 | Chevy | RSD | DAY | RCH | CAR; 27 | BRI | ATL | NWS | DAR | MAR | TAL | NSV | CLT | DOV | TWS | RSD | MCH | DAY | BRI | ATL | TAL | NSV | DAR | RCH | DOV | NWS | MAR | CLT | CAR | | | | 101st | - | |
| 1976 | Donlavey Racing | 93 | Ford | RSD | DAY | CAR | RCH | BRI | ATL | NWS | DAR; 6 | MAR | | | | | | | | | | | | | | | | | | | | | | | 48th | 513 | |
| 1976 | Hiram Handy | 33 | Chevy | | | | | | | | | | TAL; 34 | NSV; 16 | DOV; 28 | CLT | RSD | MCH | | | | TAL; 16 | MCH | BRI | DAR; 17 | RCH | DOV | MAR | NWS | | | | | | 48th | 513 | |
| 1976 | Frasson Racing | 18 | Chevy | | | | | | | | | | | | | | | | DAY; 36 | NSV | POC | | | | | | | | | | | | | | 48th | 513 | |
| 1976 | H.C. Porter | 59 | Chevy | | | | | | | | | | | | | | | | | | | | | | | | | | | CLT; 24 | CAR | ATL | ONT | | 48th | 513 | |

===== Daytona 500 =====
| Year | Team | Manufacturer | Start | Finish |
|---|---|---|---|---|
| 1959 | Buck Baker Racing | Chevrolet | 54 | 42 |
| 1960 | Buck Baker Racing | Chevrolet | 29 | 18 |
| 1961 | Buck Baker Racing | Chrysler | 7 | 9 |
| 1962 | Buck Baker Racing | Chrysler | 31 | 28 |
| 1963 | Buck Baker Racing | Pontiac | DNQ | |
| 1964 | Petty Enterprises | Plymouth | 5 | 12 |
| 1965 | Buck Baker Racing | Oldsmobile | DNQ | |
| 1966 | Buck Baker Racing | Oldsmobile | 32 | 22 |

| Preceded by Tim Flock | NASCAR Grand National Champion; 1956 | Succeeded by Buck Baker |
| Preceded by Buck Baker | NASCAR Grand National Champion; 1957 | Succeeded by Lee Petty |
